= 2024 Arkansas State Red Wolves football team =

American college football season

2024 Arkansas State Red Wolves football

68 Ventures Bowl champion

68 Ventures Bowl, W 38–31 vs. Bowling Green
- Conference: Sun Belt Conference
- West Division
- Record: 8–5 (5–3 Sun Belt)
- Head coach: Butch Jones (4th season)
- Offensive coordinator: Keith Heckendorf (6th season)
- Offensive scheme: Power spread
- Defensive coordinator: Rob Harley (4th season)
- Base defense: 4–3
- Home stadium: Centennial Bank Stadium

2024 Sun Belt Conference football standings
	Conf.			Overall
Team	W		L	W		L
East Division
Marshall xy$	7	–	1	10	–	3
Georgia Southern	6	–	2	8	–	5
James Madison	4	–	4	9	–	4
Old Dominion	4	–	4	5	–	7
Coastal Carolina	3	–	5	6	–	7
Appalachian State	3	–	5	5	–	6
Georgia State	1	–	7	3	–	9
West Division
Louisiana xy	7	–	1	10	–	4
Texas State	5	–	3	8	–	5
Arkansas State	5	–	3	8	–	5
South Alabama	5	–	3	7	–	6
Louisiana–Monroe	3	–	5	5	–	7
Troy	3	–	5	4	–	8
Southern Miss	0	–	8	1	–	11
Championship: Marshall 31, Louisiana 3
$ – Conference champion; x – Division champion/co-champions; y – Championship game participant

The 2024 Arkansas State Red Wolves football team represented Arkansas State University in the Sun Belt Conference's West Division during the 2024 NCAA Division I FBS football season. The Red Wolves were led by Butch Jones in his fourth year as the head coach. The Red Wolves played home games at Centennial Bank Stadium, located in Jonesboro, Arkansas.

This was the Red Wolves' first winning season and bowl win since 2019.

== Preseason ==
=== Media poll ===
In the Sun Belt preseason coaches' poll, the Red Wolves were picked to finish fourth place in the West division.

Offensive linemen Jacob Bayer and Makilan Thomas were awarded to be in the preseason All-Sun Belt first team offense. Defensive lineman Nate Martey was named to the All-Sun Belt first team defense.

Quarterback Jaylen Raynor, running back Ja'Quez Cross, wide receivers Courtney Jackson and Corey Rucker, and linebacker Charles Willekes were named to the second team.

== Personnel ==
2024 Arkansas State Red Wolves football team roster
Players
Coaches
Offense

Pos.	#	Name	Class
QB	1	Jaylen Raynor	So
RB	2	Ja'Quez Cross	Jr
WR	3	Hunter Summers	Fr
WR	4	Malik Hornsby	Jr
WR	5	Reginald Harden Jr.	Jr
QB	6	Timmy McClain	Jr
WR	7	Corey Rucker	Jr
QB	8	Josh Flowers	Fr
WR	9	Courtney Jackson	Sr
WR	10	Tennel Bryant	So
WR	11	Adam Jones	Sr
TE	12	Emmanual Stevenson	Sr
TE	13	Miller McCrumby	Jr
QB	14	Ty Collins	Fr
WR	15	Reagan Ealy	Sr
WR	16	Chauncy Cobb	Fr
TE	17	Jabari Bush	Fr
TE	18	James Rexroat	Fr
RB	20	Mike Sharpe II	Jr
RB	21	Zak Wallace	Sr
RB	22	Cedric Hawkins	So
WR	23	Caleb Donaldson	Fr
RB	24	Devin Spencer	Fr
WR	26	Kiandre Terry	Fr
WR	28	Carter Salzman	Fr
RB	30	Damon Sisa	Fr
RB	33	Kameron Thomas	Fr
RB	35	Javarian Otey	Fr
RB	37	Payton Greer	Fr
TE	44	Ben Karlsson	Fr
TE	46	David Pagilante	Fr
OL	52	Mason Myers	Fr
OL	54	Walker Davis	Fr
OL	55	Aleric Watson	So
OL	58	Cameron Ambrose	So
OL	60	Tyler Montgomery	Fr
OL	62	Jacob Pequeno	Fr
OL	64	Brock Simmons	Fr
OL	65	Noah Smith	Jr
OL	67	Graham McLelland	Fr
OL	68	Tristian Smith	Jr
OL	70	Royce Baucom	Fr
OL	71	Mehki Butler	Sr
OL	73	Jacob Bayer	Sr
OL	74	Elijah Zollicoffer	Jr
OL	75	EJ Ndoma-Ogar	Jr
OL	76	Trason Hunt	Fr
OL	77	Makilan Thomas	Jr
OL	78	Riley McGehee	Fr
OL	79	Baker North	Fr
WR	80	Jaden Milliner	Jr
WR	81	Takare Lipscomb	So
TE	82	Ezra Burgess	Fr
WR	84	Reed Linder	So
WR	85	TJ Starks	Fr
TE	86	Skyler Purifoy	Fr
TE	87	Tyler Little	So
WR	88	Jayvion Showers	Fr
OL	91	Austin Woods	Jr

Defense

Pos.	#	Name	Class
CB	0	Justin Hodges	Sr
DE	1	Marcus Bradley	Jr
LB	2	Chris Pearson	So
CB	3	Adrian Cole	Sr
CB	4	Bryan Whitehead	Sr
LB	5	Marvin Ham	Sr
S	6	Dontay Joyner	So
CB	7	Jordan Mahoney	Sr
S	8	Brandon Barnes	Fr
S	9	Trevian Thomas	Sr
DE	11	Drew Collins	Fr
S	12	Websley Etienne	So
S	13	Kionte Curry	Jr
S	14	AJ Wallace	Fr
S	15	Brandon Greil	So
CB	16	DeAubry Hood	Fr
DE	17	Blayne Toll	Sr
CB	18	Kyle Williams	Fr
CB	19	James Reed III	Jr
LB	20	Kyle Taylor	Jr
CB	21	Braden Jackson	Fr
DE	22	Jayden Jones	Jr
LB	23	Dane Motley	Sr
CB	24	Josh Stone	Fr
LB	25	TJ Hill	Fr
S	26	Kemari Nix	Fr
LB	27	Jamil Williams	So
LB	28	Jourdyn Burruss	Fr
S	29	Justin Parks	Sr
LB	30	Andrew Agapos	Jr
LB	31	RJ Kelly	Fr
DL	32	Ethan Hassler	Sr
LB	33	Cam Jeffery	Sr
CB	35	Spencer Makell	Fr
LB	36	Charles Willekes	Sr
CB	37	AJ Beale	So
S	39	Kanon LaRusso	Fr
DT	40	Ian Jeffries	Fr
LB	43	Chase Bogle	Fr
LB	44	Jordan Sample	Fr
DT	45	Nate Martey	Sr
DT	47	Lucas Banks	Jr
DE	48	Ryan Isenhart	Fr
DE	50	Noah Collins	Sr
DE	52	Gideon Herbert	Fr
LB	54	Logan Eason	Fr
DE	80	Kamari Stephens	Sr
DE	88	Calen Presser	Fr
DT	90	Tim Hardiman	Jr
DT	92	Odi Udom	Fr
DT	93	Braxton Nixon-Snell	Fr
DT	94	Brian Alston	Fr
DE	95	Micaiah Overton	Sr
DT	98	Alex Martin	Fr
DT	99	Timothy Gulley	Fr

Special teams

Pos.	#	Name	Class
K	25	Clayton Amaya	Fr
DS	31	Xavier Ross	Fr
K	32	Aidan Ellison	Jr
K	34	Clune Van Andel	So
DS	38	Jack Bullard	Sr
P	40	Jaxson Dunn	Fr
DS	41	Drew Nicolson	So
P	42	Magnus Haines	Jr
P	47	Ryan Heicher	Sr
DS	48	Palmer Harris	Fr
P	86	Brook Honore	So

Head coach

- Butch Jones (Ferris State)

Coordinators/assistant coaches

- Rob Harley (Michigan State)
  Defensive coordinator
- Keith Heckendorf (Nebraska)
  Offensive coordinator/qb
- Marquase Lovings (Mississippi State)
  Running backs
- Josh Conklin (Dakota State)
  Special teams coordinator / Safeties
- Nick Grimes (Sam Houston State)
  Tight ends
- Andy Kwon (Alabama)
  Offensive line
- Derrick Lett (Bowling Green State)
  Wide receivers
- Vinson Reynolds (Northern Illinois)
  Defensive line
- Jay Simpson (South Alabama)
  Defensive backs
- Griffin McCarley (West Alabama)
  Linebackers
- Alex Jones (Tennessee)
  Offensive quality control

Legend

- (C) Team captain
- (S) Suspended
- (I) Ineligible
- Injured
- Redshirt

Roster
Last update: 14 November 2024

== Schedule ==
The football schedule was announced on March 1, 2024.

Date	Time	Opponent	Site	TV	Result	Attendance
August 31	6:00 p.m.	No. 11 (FCS) Central Arkansas*	Centennial Bank Stadium; Jonesboro, AR	ESPN+	W 34–31	21,708
September 7	6:00 p.m.	Tulsa*	Centennial Bank Stadium; Jonesboro, AR	ESPN+	W 28–24	19,316
September 14	11:00 a.m.	at No. 17 Michigan*	Michigan Stadium; Ann Arbor, MI	BTN	L 18–28	110,250
September 21	1:00 p.m.	at No. 20 Iowa State*	Jack Trice Stadium; Ames, IA	ESPN+	L 7–52	55,428
October 5	6:00 p.m.	South Alabama^{†}	Centennial Bank Stadium; Jonesboro, AR	ESPN+	W 18–16	21,427
October 12	6:00 p.m.	at Texas State	UFCU Stadium; San Marcos, TX	ESPN+	L 9–41	28,000
October 19	6:00 p.m.	at Southern Miss	M. M. Roberts Stadium; Hattiesburg, MS	ESPN+	W 44–28	24,542
October 26	6:00 p.m.	Troy	Centennial Bank Stadium; Jonesboro, AR	ESPN+	W 34–31	17,162
November 9	4:00 p.m.	at Louisiana	Cajun Field; Lafayette, LA	ESPN+	L 19–55	16,451
November 16	4:00 p.m.	at Georgia State	Center Parc Stadium; Atlanta, GA	ESPN+	W 27–20	14,047
November 23	2:00 p.m.	Louisiana–Monroe	Centennial Bank Stadium; Jonesboro, AR	ESPN+	W 28–21	14,029
November 30	2:00 p.m.	Old Dominion	Centennial Bank Stadium; Jonesboro, AR	ESPN+	L 32–40	13,584
December 26	8:00 p.m.	vs. Bowling Green*	Hancock Whitney Stadium; Mobile, AL (68 Ventures Bowl)	ESPN	W 38–31	19,582
*Non-conference game; ^{†}Homecoming; Rankings from AP Poll and CFP Rankings released prior to game; All times are in Central time

== Game summaries ==
=== vs. No. 11 (FCS) Central Arkansas ===
Game One – No. 11 (FCS) Central Arkansas Bears (0–0) at Arkansas State Red Wolves (0–0) – Game summary

Quarter	1	2	3	4	Total
No. 11 (FCS) Bears	0	0	10	21	31
Red Wolves	6	7	7	14	34

at Centennial Bank Stadium • Jonesboro, AR

- Date: Saturday August 31, 2024
- Game time: 6:00 p.m.
- Game weather: Sunny • Temperature: 91 °F (33 °C) • Wind: N at 5 miles per hour (8.0 km/h)
- Game attendance: 21,708
- Referee: Marshall Lewis
- TV announcers (ESPN+): Roger Twibell (play-by-play) and Darrell Greene (analyst)

Game information

First quarter

- (12:47) ARST – Clune Van Andel 44-yard field goal (Drive: 7 plays, 42 yards, 2:05; Arkansas State 3–0)
- (2:20) ARST – Clune Van Andel 23-yard field goal (Drive: 18 plays, 75 yards, 7:23; Arkansas State 6–0)

Second quarter

- (0:37) ARST – Zak Wallace 1-yard run, Clune Van Andel kick (Drive: 9 plays, 75 yards, 1:33; Arkansas State 13–0)

Third quarter

- (14:02) UCA – Jake Gaster 42-yard field goal (Drive: 4 plays, 19 yards, 0:50; Arkansas State 13–3)
- (10:36) UCA – ShunDerrick Powell 23-yard run, Jake Gaster kick (Drive: 4 plays, 43 yards, 2:06; Arkansas State 13–10)
- (7:40) ARST – Zak Wallace 2-yard run, Clune Van Andel kick (Drive: 9 plays, 68 yards, 2:48; Arkansas State 20–10)

Fourth quarter

- (14:15) ARST – Jaylen Raynor 5-yard run, Clune Van Andel kick (Drive: 9 plays, 98 yards, 4:28; Arkansas State 27–10)
- (13:38) UCA – ShunDerrick Powell 81-yard run, Jake Gaster kick (Drive: 2 plays, 89 yards, 0:33; Arkansas State 27–17)
- (10:33) UCA – Tyion Berry 23-yard pass from Will McElvain, Jake Gaster kick (Drive: 6 plays, 83 yards, 1:43; Arkansas State 27–24)
- (0:55) UCA – Darius Hale 4-yard run, Jake Gaster kick (Drive: 3 plays, 35 yards, 0:50; Central Arkansas 31–27)
- (0:03) ARST – Corey Rucker 7-yard pass from Jaylen Raynor, Clune Van Andel kick (Drive: 7 plays, 70 yards, 0:52; Arkansas State 34–31)

Statistics	UCA	ARST
First downs	20	24
Total yards	432	457
Rushing yards	235	140
Passing yards	197	317
Passing: Comp–Att–Int	16–29–0	24–47–1
Time of possession	27:23	32:37

Team	Category	Player	Statistics
Central Arkansas	Passing	Will McElvain	15/28, 168 yards, TD
Central Arkansas	Rushing	ShunDerrick Powell	15 carries, 176 yards, 2 TD
Central Arkansas	Receiving	Malachi Henry	4 receptions, 61 yards
Arkansas State	Passing	Jaylen Raynor	24/47, 317 yards, TD, INT
Arkansas State	Rushing	Ja'Quez Cross	13 carries, 50 yards
Arkansas State	Receiving	Corey Rucker	9 receptions, 179 yards, TD

=== vs. Tulsa ===
Game Two – Tulsa Golden Hurricane (1–0) at Arkansas State Red Wolves (1–0) – Game summary

Quarter	1	2	3	4	Total
Golden Hurricane	3	14	7	0	24
Red Wolves	7	0	21	0	28

at Centennial Bank Stadium • Jonesboro, Arkansas

- Date: Saturday September 7, 2024
- Game time: 6:00 p.m.
- Game weather: Clear • Temperature: 76 °F (24 °C) • Wind: NE at 15 miles per hour (24 km/h)
- Game attendance: 19,316
- Referee: Charles Lamertina
- TV announcers (ESPN+): Matt Stolz (play-by-play) and Darion Griswold (analyst)

Game information

First quarter

- (6:48) TLSA – Seth Morgan 29 yard field goal (Drive: 11 plays, 53 yards, 4:40; Tulsa 3–0)
- (4:45) ARST – Adam Jones 35 yard pass from Jaylen Raynor, Clune Van Andel kick (Drive: 5 plays, 84 yards, 1:57; Arkansas State 7–3)

Second quarter

- (8:57) TLSA – Kamdyn Benjamin 39 yard pass from Kirk Francis, Seth Morgan kick (Drive: 11 plays, 90 yards, 4:57; Tulsa 10–7)
- (2:35) TLSA – Cardell Williams 5 yard run, Seth Morgan kick (Drive: 5 plays, 31 yards, 2:01; Tulsa 17–7)

Third quarter

- (12:40) ARST – Jaylen Raynor 15 yard run, Clune Van Andel kick (Drive: 3 plays, 63 yards, 0:58; Tulsa 17–14)
- (10:53) ARST – Courtney Jackson 77 yard punt return, Clune Van Andel kick (Arkansas State 21–17)
- (9:42) TLSA – Anthony Watkins 2 yard run, Seth Morgan kick (Drive: 3 plays, 65 yards, 1:11; Tulsa 24–21)
- (3:30) ARST – Corey Rucker 5 yard pass from Jaylen Raynor, Clune Van Andel kick (Drive: 14 plays, 79 yards, 6:06; Arkansas State 28–24)

Fourth quarter

- No scoring plays

Statistics	TLSA	ARST
First downs	19	14
Total yards	362	396
Rushing yards	163	141
Passing yards	199	255
Passing: Comp–Att–Int	16–29–1	21–32–1
Time of possession	25:37	34:23

Team	Category	Player	Statistics
Tulsa	Passing	Kirk Francis	16/28, 199 yards, 1 TD, 1 INT
Tulsa	Rushing	Lloyd Avant	14 carries, 61 yards
Tulsa	Receiving	Kamdyn Benjamin	6 receptions, 131 yards, 1 TD
Arkansas State	Passing	Jaylen Raynor	21/32, 255 yards, 2 TD, 1 INT
Arkansas State	Rushing	Zak Wallace	16 carries, 78 yards
Arkansas State	Receiving	Reagan Ealy	6 receptions, 68 yards

=== at No. 17 Michigan ===
Game Three – Arkansas State Red Wolves (2–0) vs No. 17 Michigan Wolverines (1–1) – Game summary

Quarter	1	2	3	4	Total
Red Wolves	0	3	0	15	18
No. 17 Wolverines	7	14	0	7	28

at Michigan Stadium • Ann Arbor, MI

- Date: September 14, 2024
- Game time: 11:00 a.m.
- Game weather: 78 °F (26 °C), sunny, NE 7 miles per hour (11 km/h)
- Game attendance: 110,250
- Referee: Jerry McGinn
- TV announcers (BTN): Jeff Levering (play-by-play), Jake Butt (analyst), and Brooke Fletcher (sideline reporter)

Game information

First quarter

- (2:23) MICH – Kalel Mullings 30-yard run, Dominic Zvada kick (Drive: 11 plays, 76 yards, 6:39; Michigan 7–0)

Second quarter

- (14:18) ASU – Clune Van Andel 27-yard field goal (Drive: 4 plays, 6 yards, 1:10; Michigan 7–3)
- (6:41) MICH – Donovan Edwards 7-yard run, Dominic Zvada kick (Drive: 13 plays, 75 yards, 7:37; Michigan 14–3)
- (2:57) MICH – Kalel Mullings 5-yard run, Dominic Zvada kick (Drive: 4 plays, 55 yards, 1:59; Michigan 21–3)

Fourth quarter

- (12:49) MICH – Hogan Hansen 9-yard pass from Alex Orji, Dominic Zvada kick (Drive: 9 plays, 80 yards, 5:18; Michigan 28–3)
- (5:38) ASU – Reginald Harden Jr. 24-yard pass from Timmy McClain, Clune Van Andel kick (Drive: 9 plays, 64 yards, 3:40; Michigan 28–10)
- (0:08) ASU – Reginald Harden Jr. 22-yard pass from Timmy McClain, Timmy McClain run (Drive: 11 plays, 75 yards, 3:50; Michigan 28–18)

Statistics	ARST	MICH
First downs	17	20
Total yards	280	435
Rushing yards	58	301
Passing yards	222	134
Passing: Comp–Att–Int	26–44–1	13–18–3
Time of possession	25:36	34:24

Team	Category	Player	Statistics
Arkansas State	Passing	Jaylen Raynor	19/33, 140 yards, INT
Arkansas State	Rushing	Devin Spencer	7 carries, 28 yards
Arkansas State	Receiving	Reginald Harden Jr.	3 receptions, 52 yards, 2 TD
Michigan	Passing	Davis Warren	11/14, 122 yards, 3 INT
Michigan	Rushing	Kalel Mullings	15 carries, 153 yards, 2 TD
Michigan	Receiving	Marlin Klein	3 receptions, 43 yards

=== at No. 20 Iowa State ===
Game Four – Arkansas State Red Wolves (2–1) vs No. 20 Iowa State Cyclones (2–0) – Game summary

Quarter	1	2	3	4	Total
Red Wolves	0	0	0	7	7
No. 20 Cyclones	14	17	7	14	52

at Jack Trice Stadium • Ames, IA

- Date: September 21, 2024
- Game time: 1:00 p.m.
- Game weather: Sunny • Temperature: 88 °F (31 °C) • Wind: SW at 15 miles per hour (24 km/h)
- Game attendance: 55,428
- Referee: Ted Pitts
- TV announcers (ESPN+): Richard Cross (play-by-play), Taylor McHargue (analyst), and Tori Petry (sideline reporter)

Game information

First quarter

- (8:47) ISU – Carson Hansen 1-yard run, Kyle Konrardy kick (Drive: 6 plays, 60 yards, 2:29; Iowa State 7–0)
- (0:45) ISU – Rocco Becht 1-yard run, Kyle Konrardy kick (Drive: 10 plays, 80 yards, 4:08; Iowa State 14–0)

Second quarter

- (9:00) ISU – Kyle Konrardy 31-yard field goal (Drive: 6 plays, 52 yards, 2:29; Iowa State 17–0)
- (2:21) ISU – Tyler Moore 10-yard pass from Rocco Becht, Kyle Konrardy kick (Drive: 7 plays, 66 yards, 3:24; Iowa State 24–0)
- (1:27) ISU – Jayden Higgins 16-yard pass from Rocco Becht, Kyle Konrardy kick (Drive: 1 play, 16 yards, 0:04; Iowa State 31–0)

Third quarter

- (8:00) ISU – Carson Hansen 3-yard run, Kyle Konrardy kick (Drive: 9 plays, 69 yards, 4:49; Iowa State 38–0)

Fourth quarter

- (11:54) ISU – Dylan Lee 1-yard run, Kyle Konrardy kick (Drive: 10 plays, 58 yards, 4:37; Iowa State 45–0)
- (4:53) ASU – Hunter Summers 27-yard pass from Timmy McClain, Clune Van Andel kick (Drive: 5 plays, 43 yards, 1:54; Iowa State 45–7)
- (0:24) ISU – Aiden Flora 8-yard run, Kyle Konrardy kick (Drive: 8 plays, 75 yards, 4:29; Iowa State 52–7)

Statistics	ARST	ISU
First downs	12	25
Total yards	182	490
Rushing yards	64	237
Passing yards	118	253
Passing: Comp–Att–Int	9–23–2	16–25–2
Time of possession	25:16	34:44

Team	Category	Player	Statistics
Arkansas State	Passing	Jaylen Raynor	5/16, 68 yards, 2 INT
Arkansas State	Rushing	Devin Spencer	9 carries, 52 yards
Arkansas State	Receiving	Hunter Summers	2 receptions, 37 yards, TD
Iowa State	Passing	Rocco Becht	11/18, 204 yards, 2 TD, INT
Iowa State	Rushing	Carson Hansen	9 carries, 58 yards, 2 TD
Iowa State	Receiving	Benjamin Brahmer	3 receptions, 73 yards

=== vs. South Alabama ===
Game Five – South Alabama Jaguars (2–3) at Arkansas State Red Wolves (2–2)

Quarter	1	2	3	4	Total
Jaguars	0	3	7	6	16
Red Wolves	3	3	3	9	18

at Centennial Bank Stadium, Jonesboro, AR

- Date: October 5, 2024
- Game time: 6:00 p.m.
- Game weather: Sunny • Temperature: 84 °F (29 °C) • Wind: SE 4 mph
- Game attendance: 21,427
- Referee: Jeremy Parker
- TV announcers (ESPN+): Roger Twibell (play-by-play), Pete Cordelli (analyst) and Darrell Greene (sideline)

Game information

First Quarter

- (4:43) ASU – Clune Van Andel 20-yard field goal (Drive: 7 plays, 83 yards, 2:36; Arkansas State 3–0)

Second Quarter

- (1:01) ASU – Clune Van Andel 21-yard field goal (Drive: 12 plays, 76 yards, 3:02; Arkansas State 6–0)
- (0:00) USA – Laith Marjan 42-yard field goal (Drive: 7 plays, 45 yards, 1:00; Arkansas State 6–3)

Third Quarter

- (1:54) ASU – Clune Van Andel 25-yard field goal (Drive: 7 plays, 79 yards, 2:47; Arkansas State 9–3)
- (1:09) USA – Jamaal Pritchett 75-yard pass from Gio Lopez, Laith Marjan kick (Drive: 2 plays, 75 yards, 0:45; South Alabama 10–9)

Fourth Quarter

- (5:58) ASU – Tyler Little 5-yard pass from Jaylen Raynor (Drive: 10 plays, 58 yards, 5:32; Arkansas State 15–10)
- (1:48) USA – Jamaal Pritchett 26-yard pass from Gio Lopez (Drive: 10 plays, 80 yards, 4:08; South Alabama 16–15)
- (0:10) ASU – Clune Van Andel 34-yard field goal (Drive: 10 plays, 60 yards, 1:35; Arkansas State 18–16)

Statistics	USA	ARST
First downs	24	24
Total yards	453	411
Rushing yards	161	66
Passing yards	292	345
Passing: Comp–Att–Int	21–36–1	30–39–0
Time of possession	30:57	29:03

Team	Category	Player	Statistics
South Alabama	Passing	Gio Lopez	21/35, 292 yards, 2 TD, INT
South Alabama	Rushing	Kentrel Bullock	13 carries, 66 yards
South Alabama	Receiving	Jamaal Pritchett	7 receptions, 137 yards, 2 TD
Arkansas State	Passing	Jaylen Raynor	30/39, 345 yards, TD
Arkansas State	Rushing	Zak Wallace	11 carries, 30 yards
Arkansas State	Receiving	Corey Rucker	8 receptions, 172 yards

=== at Texas State ===
Game Six – Arkansas State Red Wolves (3–2) at Texas State Bobcats (3–2) – Game summary

Quarter	1	2	3	4	Total
Red Wolves	3	6	0	0	9
Bobcats	14	3	14	10	41

at Bobcat Stadium, San Marcos, Texas

- Date: October 12, 2024
- Game time: 6:00 p.m.
- Game weather: Sunny
- Game attendance: 28,000
- Referee: Tim Barker
- TV announcers (ESPN+): Brant Freeman (play-by-play), Keith Moreland (analyst) and Koral Allemand (sideline)

Game information

First quarter

- (13:13) ARST – Clune Van Andel 41-yard field goal (Drive: 5 plays, 51 yards, 1:47; Arkansas State 3–0)
- (10:54) TXST – Kole Wilson 53-yard pass from Jordan McCloud, Mason Shipley kick (Drive: 6 plays, 75 yards, 2:11; Texas State 7–3)
- (1:12) TXST – Jordan McCloud 5-yard run, Mason Shipley kick (Drive: 11 plays, 86 yards, 5:07; Texas State 14–3)

Second quarter

- (11:10) ARST – Clune Van Andel 40-yard field goal (Drive: 11 plays, 53 yards, 5:02; Texas State 14–6)
- (6:37) TXST – Mason Shipley 39-yard field goal (Drive: 10 plays, 53 yards, 4:33; Texas State 17–6)
- (0:15) ARST – Clune Van Andel 25-yard field goal (Drive: 12 plays, 73 yards, 1:38; Texas State 17–9)

Third quarter

- (13:53) TXST – Jaden Williams 25-yard pass from Jordan McCloud, Mason Shipley kick (Drive: 3 plays, 75 yards, 1:07; Texas State 24–9)
- (8:08) TXST – Joey Hobert 30-yard pass from Jordan McCloud, Mason Shipley kick (Drive: 3 plays, 57 yards, 1:33; Texas State 31–9)

Fourth quarter

- (14:56) TXST – Joey Hobert 8-yard pass from Jordan McCloud, Mason Shipley kick (Drive: 10 plays, 93 yards, 4:24; Texas State 38–9)
- (3:42) TXST – Mason Shipley 29-yard field goal (Drive: 14 plays, 72 yards, 9:26; Texas State 41–9)

Statistics	ARST	TXST
First downs	20	28
Total yards	384	591
Rushing yards	171	271
Passing yards	213	320
Turnovers	2	0
Time of possession	24:56	35:04

Team	Category	Player	Statistics
Arkansas State	Passing	Jaylen Raynor	24/38, 207 yards, INT
Arkansas State	Rushing	Ja'Quez Cross	9 carries, 117 yards
Arkansas State	Receiving	Ja'Quez Cross	6 receptions, 48 yards
Texas State	Passing	Jordan McCloud	24/29, 320 yards, 4 TD
Texas State	Rushing	Ismail Mahdi	17 carries, 164 yards
Texas State	Receiving	Joey Hobert	10 receptions, 101 yards, 2 TD

=== at Southern Miss ===
Game Seven – Arkansas State Red Wolves (3–3) at Southern Miss Golden Eagles (1–5) – Game summary

Quarter	1	2	3	4	Total
Red Wolves	21	7	13	3	44
Golden Eagles	7	14	0	7	28

at M. M. Roberts Stadium, Hattiesburg, Mississippi

- Date: October 19, 2024
- Game time: 6:00 p.m.
- Game weather: Sunny • Temperature: 75 °F (24 °C) • Wind: NE 4 miles per hour (6.4 km/h)
- Game attendance: 24,542
- Referee: Marshall Lewis
- TV announcers (ESPN+): Jason Baker (play-by-play) and Austin Davis (analyst)

Game information

First quarter

- (11:49) ARST – Adam Jones 14-yard pass from Jaylen Raynor, Clune Van Andel kick (Drive: 9 plays, 75 yards, 3:11; Arkansas State 7–0)
- (10:11) ARST – Malik Hornsby 73-yard run, Clune Van Andel (Drive: 1 play, 73 yards, 0:13; Arkansas State 14–0)
- (5:26) USM – Kenyon Clay 1-yard run, Connor Gibbs kick (Drive: 11 plays, 75 yards, 4:45; Arkansas State 14–7)
- (0:59) ARST – Ja'Quez Cross 10-yard pass from Jaylen Raynor, Clune Van Andel kick (Drive: 11 plays, 68 yards, 4:21; Arkansas State 21–7)

Second quarter

- (7:24) USM – Ethan Crawford 5-yard run, Connor Gibbs kick (Drive: 11 plays, 65 yards, 4:38; Arkansas State 21–14)
- (4:48) ARST – Corey Rucker 13-yard pass from Jaylen Raynor, Clune Van Andel kick (Drive: 6 plays, 65 yards, 2:38; Arkansas State 28–14)
- (0:54) USM – Jalen Washington 4-yard run, Connor Gibbs kick (Drive: 10 plays, 73 yards, 3:54; Arkansas State 28–21)

Third quarter

- (8:37) ARST – Ja'Quez Cross 10-yard run, Clune Van Andel kick (Drive: 11 plays, 72 yards, 4:55; Arkansas State 35–21)
- (7:22) ARST – Clune Van Andel 25-yard field goal (Drive: 5 plays, 5 yards, 1:04; Arkansas State 38–21)
- (5:24) ARST – Clune Van Andel 36-yard field goal (Drive: 4 plays, 3 yards, 1:28; Arkansas State 41–21)

Fourth quarter

- (9:57) USM – Ethan Crawford 3-yard run, Connor Gibbs kick (Drive: 15 plays, 74 yards, 6:18; Arkansas State 41–28)
- (0:50) ARST – Clune Van Andel 20-yard field goal (Drive: 17 plays, 72 yards, 9:07; Arkansas State 44–28)

Statistics	ARST	USM
First downs	23	24
Total yards	467	367
Rushing yards	281	180
Passing yards	186	187
Turnovers	0	3
Time of possession	31:13	28:47

Team	Category	Player	Statistics
Arkansas State	Passing	Jaylen Raynor	20/31, 186 yards, 3 TD
Arkansas State	Rushing	Ja'Quez Cross	18 carries, 127 yards, TD
Arkansas State	Receiving	Courtney Jackson	3 receptions, 55 yards
Southern Miss	Passing	Ethan Crawford	15/23, 187 yards, INT
Southern Miss	Rushing	Ethan Crawford	26 carries, 87 yards, 2 TD
Southern Miss	Receiving	Reed Jesiolowski	4 receptions, 51 yards

=== vs. Troy ===
Game Eight – Troy Trojans (1–6) at Arkansas State Red Wolves (4–3)

Quarter	1	2	3	4	Total
Trojans	0	3	21	7	31
Red Wolves	13	10	3	8	34

at Centennial Bank Stadium, Jonesboro, AR

- Date: Saturday October 26, 2024
- Game time: 6:00 p.m. CDT
- Game weather: Sunny • Temperature: 70 °F (21 °C) • Wind: NE 8 miles per hour (13 km/h)
- Game attendance: 17,162
- Referee: Scott Broadway
- TV announcers (ESPN+): Darrell Greene (play-by-play) and Pete Cordelli (analyst)

Game information

First Quarter

- (11:19) ASU – Clune Van Andel 22-yard field goal (Drive: 9 plays, 71 yards, 3:41; Arkansas State 3–0)
- (7:58) ASU – Clune Van Andel 19-yard field goal (Drive: 7 plays, 26 yards, 3:16; Arkansas State 6–0)
- (1:40) ASU – Zak Wallace 5-yard run, Clune Van Andel kick (Drive: 10 plays, 99 yards, 3:54; Arkansas State 13–0)

Second Quarter

- (8:20) TRO – Scott Taylor Renfroe 38-yard field goal (Drive: 14 plays, 55 yards, 8:20; Arkansas State 13–3)
- (4:39) ASU – Zak Wallace 3-yard run, Clune Van Andel kick (Drive: 9 plays, 71 yards, 3:37; Arkansas State 20–3)
- (0:02) ASU – Clune Van Andel 39-yard field goal (Drive: 8 plays, 35 yards, 1:15; Arkansas State 23–3)

Third Quarter

- (9:44) TRO – Damien Taylor 1-yard run, Scott Taylor Renfroe kick (Drive: 11 plays, 75 yards, 5:16; Arkansas State 23–10)
- (6:00) TRO – Brody Dalton 16-yard pass from Matthew Caldwell, Scott Taylor Renfroe kick (Drive: 6 plays, 53 yards, 2:36; Arkansas State 23–17)
- (3:34) TRO – Peyton Higgins 1-yard pass from Matthew Caldwell, Scott Taylor Renfroe kick (Drive: 3 plays, 27 yards, 1:08; Troy 24–23)
- (0:49) ASU – Clune Van Andel 46-yard field goal (Drive: 9 plays, 46 yards, 2:45; Arkansas State 26–24)

Fourth Quarter

- (1:45) TRO – Gerald Green 2-yard run, Scott Taylor Renfroe kick (Drive: 10 plays, 80 yards, 3:32; Troy 31–26)
- (0:33) ASU – Zak Wallace 1-yard run, Corey Rucker pass (Drive: 9 plays, 75 yards, 1:12; Arkansas State 34–31)

Statistics	TROY	ARST
First downs	23	26
Total yards	466	534
Rushing yards	162	185
Passing yards	304	349
Passing: Comp–Att–Int	22–33–3	25–40–0
Time of possession	30:47	29:13

Team	Category	Player	Statistics
Troy	Passing	Matthew Caldwell	22/33, 304 yards, 2 TD, 3 INT
Troy	Rushing	Gerald Green	20 carries, 113 yards, TD
Troy	Receiving	Devonte Ross	11 receptions, 126 yards
Arkansas State	Passing	Jaylen Raynor	25/40, 349 yards
Arkansas State	Rushing	Jaylen Raynor	12 carries, 71 yards
Arkansas State	Receiving	Corey Rucker	12 receptions, 193 yards

=== at Louisiana ===
Game Nine – Arkansas State Red Wolves (5–3) at Louisiana Ragin' Cajuns (7–1)

Quarter	1	2	3	4	Total
Red Wolves	0	6	6	7	19
Ragin' Cajuns	10	21	17	7	55

at Cajun Field, Lafayette, LA

- Date: Saturday November 9, 2024
- Game time: 4:00 p.m. CDT
- Game weather: Sunny • Temperature: 80 °F (27 °C) • Wind: W 5 miles per hour (8.0 km/h)
- Game attendance: 16,451
- Referee: Trennis Livingston
- TV announcers (ESPN+): Dan McDonald (play-by-play) and Eric Mouton (analyst)

Game information

First Quarter

- (9:07) LA – Harvey Broussard 20-yard pass from Ben Wooldridge, Kenneth Almendares kick (Drive: 7 plays, 71 yards, 3:13; Louisiana 7–0)
- (3:04) LA – Kenneth Almendares 44-yard field goal (Drive: 6 plays, 41 yards, 2:07; Louisiana 10–0)

Second Quarter

- (12:15) LA – Dre'lyn Washington 46-yard run, Kenneth Almendares kick (Drive: 6 plays, 64 yards, 2:45; Louisiana 17–0)
- (7:23) LA – Zylan Perry 4-yard run, Kenneth Almendares kick (Drive: 5 plays, 41 yards, 2:20; Louisiana 24–0)
- (1:47) LA – Bill Davis 13-yard run, Kenneth Almendares kick (Drive: 7 plays, 94 yards, 3:30; Louisiana 31–0)
- (0:07) ARST – Adam Jones 16-yard pass from Jaylen Raynor (Drive: 11 plays, 83 yards, 1:36; Louisiana 31–6)

Third Quarter

- (10:54) LA – Kenneth Almendares 45-yard field goal (Drive: 9 plays, 47 yards, 4:06; Louisiana 34–6)
- (8:52) ARST – Zak Wallace 13-yard run (Drive: 7 plays, 75 yards, 2:02; Louisiana 34–12)
- (5:57) LA – Bill Davis 10-yard run, Kenneth Almendares kick (Drive: 6 plays, 70 yards, 2:46; Louisiana 41–12)
- (0:34) LA – Dre'lyn Washington 14-yard run, Kenneth Almendares kick (Drive: 5 plays, 80 yards, 2:19; Louisiana 48–12)

Fourth Quarter

- (8:46) LA – Chandler Fields 12-yard run, Kenneth Almendares kick (Drive: 9 plays, 80 yards, 4:42; Louisiana 55–12)
- (3:48) ARST – Timmy McClain 10-yard run, Clune Van Andel kick (Drive: 8 plays, 79 yards, 4:52; Louisiana 55–19)

Statistics	ARST	LA
First downs	27	27
Total yards	401	579
Rushing yards	209	278
Passing yards	192	301
Passing: Comp–Att–Int	25–37–2	22–33–0
Time of possession	29:23	30:37

Team	Category	Player	Statistics
Arkansas State	Passing	Jaylen Raynor	23/35, 167 yards, TD, 2 INT
Arkansas State	Rushing	Ja'Quez Cross	14 carries, 81 yards
Arkansas State	Receiving	Corey Rucker	6 receptions, 73 yards
Louisiana	Passing	Ben Wooldridge	17/26, 264 yards, TD
Louisiana	Rushing	Dre'lyn Washington	8 carries, 123 yards, 2 TD
Louisiana	Receiving	Lance LeGendre	4 receptions, 58 yards

=== at Georgia State ===
Game Ten – Arkansas State Red Wolves (5–4) at Georgia State Panthers (2–7)

Quarter	1	2	3	4	Total
Red Wolves	7	0	10	10	27
Panthers	7	0	7	6	20

at Center Parc Stadium • Atlanta, GA

- Date: Saturday November 16, 2024
- Game time: 4:00 p.m. CDT
- Game weather: Sunny
- Game attendance: 14,047
- Referee: Jeremy Parker
- TV announcers (ESPN+): Matt Stewart (play-by-play) and Sam Crenshaw (analyst)

Game information

First quarter

- (7:17) GAST – Ted Hurst 24-yard pass from Zach Gibson, Liam Rickman kick (Drive: 7 plays, 66 yards, 3:51; Georgia State 7–0)
- (3:34) ARST – Zak Wallace 13-yard run, Clune Van Andel kick (Drive: 7 plays, 75 yards, 3:43; Tied 7–7)

Second quarter

No scoring plays

Third quarter

- (9:32) ARST – Zak Wallace 1-yard run, Clune Van Andel kick (Drive: 6 plays, 54 yards, 2:49; Arkansas State 14–7)
- (2:03) GAST – Michel Dukes 12-yard pass from Christian Veilleux, Liam Rickman kick (Drive: 4 plays, 70 yards, 1:16; Tied 14–14)
- (0:31) ARST – Clune Van Andel 44-yard field goal (Drive: 7 plays, 49 yards, 1:32; Arkansas State 17–14)

Fourth quarter

- (14:03) ARST – Ja'Quez Cross 15-yard run, Clune Van Andel kick (Drive: 2 plays, 23 yards, 0:32; Arkansas State 24–14)
- (11:18) GAST – Braeden McAlister 48-yard field goal (Drive: 7 plays, 45 yards, 2:40; Arkansas State 24–17)
- (7:59) ARST – Clune Van Andel 52-yard field goal (Drive: 6 plays, 41 yards, 3:19; Arkansas State 27–17)
- (5:52) GAST – Liam Rickman 40-yard field goal (Drive: 11 plays, 56 yards, 2:02; Arkansas State 27–20)

Statistics	ARST	GAST
First downs	20	23
Total yards	358	411
Rushing yards	261	65
Passing yards	97	346
Passing: Comp–Att–Int	10–17–0	26–49–2
Time of possession	30:20	29:40

Team	Category	Player	Statistics
Arkansas State	Passing	Jaylen Raynor	10/17, 97 yards
Arkansas State	Rushing	Jaylen Raynor	16 carries, 114 yards
Arkansas State	Receiving	Courtney Jackson	3 receptions, 40 yards
Georgia State	Passing	Christian Veilleux	17/35, 245 yards, TD, INT
Georgia State	Rushing	Michel Dukes	6 carries, 32 yards
Georgia State	Receiving	Ted Hurst	9 receptions, 173 yards, TD

=== vs. Louisiana–Monroe ===
Game Eleven – Louisiana–Monroe Warhawks (5–5) at Arkansas State Red Wolves (6–4) – Game summary

Quarter	1	2	3	4	Total
Warhawks	7	0	7	7	21
Red Wolves	7	7	7	7	28

at Centennial Bank Stadium • Jonesboro, AR

- Date: Saturday November 23, 2024
- Game time: 2:00 p.m.
- Game weather: Sunny • Temperature: 55 °F (13 °C) • Wind: S 7 miles per hour (11 km/h)
- Game attendance: 14,029
- Referee: Steven Robinson
- TV announcers (ESPN+): Roger Twibell (play-by-play), Pete Cordelli (analyst) and Darrell Greene (sideline)

Game information

First quarter

- (12:27) ULM – Jake Godfrey 26-yard pass from Aidan Armenta, Max Larson kick (Drive: 5 plays, 75 yards, 2:33; Louisiana–Monroe 7–0)
- (6:50) ARST – Zak Wallace 2-yard run, Clune Van Andel kick (Drive: 14 plays, 74 yards, 5:32; Tied 7–7)

Second quarter

- (7:52) ARST – Corey Rucker 32-yard pass from Jaylen Raynor, Clune Van Andel kick (Drive: 9 plays, 53 yards, 3:24; Arkansas State 14–7)

Third quarter

- (11:59) ULM – Ahmad Hardy 72-yard run, Max Larson kick (Drive: 2 plays, 65 yards, 1:01; Tied 14–14)
- (0:40) ARST – Hunter Summers 12-yard pass from Jaylen Raynor, Clune Van Andel kick (Drive: 14 plays, 69 yards, 6:26; Arkansas State 21–14)

Fourth quarter

- (9:15) ULM – Ahmad Hardy 1-yard run, Max Larson kick (Drive: 10 plays, 70 yards, 6:25; Tied 21–21)
- (7:58) ARST – Courtney Jackson 44-yard pass from Jaylen Raynor, Clune Van Andel kick (Drive: 3 plays, 61 yards, 1:12; Arkansas State 28–21)

Statistics	ULM	ARST
First downs	19	21
Total yards	393	357
Rushing yards	256	187
Passing yards	137	170
Passing: Comp–Att–Int	11–22–1	18–26–0
Time of possession	31:19	28:41

Team	Category	Player	Statistics
Louisiana–Monroe	Passing	Aidan Armenta	11/22, 137 yards, TD, INT
Louisiana–Monroe	Rushing	Ahmad Hardy	30 carries, 204 yards, 2 TD
Louisiana–Monroe	Receiving	Jake Godfrey	5 receptions, 58 yards, TD
Arkansas State	Passing	Jaylen Raynor	18/26, 170 yards, 3 TD
Arkansas State	Rushing	Zak Wallace	18 carries, 130 yards, TD
Arkansas State	Receiving	Courtney Jackson	6 receptions, 69 yards, TD

=== vs. Old Dominion ===
Game Twelve – Old Dominion Monarchs (4–7) at Arkansas State Red Wolves (7–4) – Game summary

Quarter	1	2	3	4	Total
Monarchs	14	7	19	0	40
Red Wolves	7	7	15	3	32

at Centennial Bank Stadium • Jonesboro, AR

- Date: Saturday November 30, 2024
- Game time: 2:00 p.m.
- Game weather: Light rain • Temperature: 49 °F (9 °C) • Wind: SSW 14 miles per hour (23 km/h)
- Game attendance: 13,584
- Referee: Tim Barker
- TV announcers (ESPN+): Roger Twibell (play-by-play), Pete Cordelli (analyst) and Darrell Greene (sideline)

Game information

First quarter

- (11:37) ODU – Quinn Henicle 92 yard run, Ethan Sanchez kick (Drive: 1 play, 92 yards, 0:14; Old Dominion 7–0)
- (5:43) ODU – Aaron Young 1 yard run, Ethan Sanchez kick (Drive: 13 plays, 90 yards, 5:35; Old Dominion 14–0)
- (0:58) ARST – Corey Rucker 36 yard pass from Jaylen Raynor, Clune Van Andel kick (Drive: 6 plays, 49 yards, 1:28; Old Dominion 14–7)

Second quarter

- (5:58) ODU – Aaron Young 24 yard run, Ethan Sanchez kick (Drive: 8 plays, 73 yards, 3:39; Old Dominion 21–7)
- (1:54) ARST – Manny Stevenson Jr. 15 yard pass from Jaylen Raynor, Clune Van Andel kick (Drive: 9 plays, 68 yards, 4:00; Old Dominion 21–14)

Third quarter

- (11:40) ODU – Pat Conroy 15 yard pass from Quinn Henicle, Ethan Sanchez kick failed (Drive: 8 plays, 75 yards, 3:20; Old Dominion 27–14)
- (8:58) ARST – Courtney Jackson 35 yard pass from Jaylen Raynor, Clune Van Andel kick (Drive: 8 plays, 75 yards, 2:42; Old Dominion 27–21)
- (8:46) ODU – Pat Conroy 75 yard pass from Quinn Henicle, Ethan Sanchez kick failed (Drive: 1 play, 75 yards, 0:12; Old Dominion 33–21)
- (4:48) ODU – Quinn Henicle 1 yard run, Ethan Sanchez kick (Drive: 3 plays, 45 yards, 1:15; Old Dominion 40–21)
- (0:23) ARST – Zak Wallace 1 yard run, Jaylen Raynor pass to Corey Rucker for two-point conversion (Drive: 12 plays, 75 yards, 4:25; Old Dominion 40–29)

Fourth quarter

- (6:03) ARST – Clune Van Andel 26 yard field goal (Drive: 14 plays, 75 yards, 4:35; Old Dominion 40–32)

Statistics	ODU	ARST
First downs	23	26
Total yards	549	410
Rushing yards	406	149
Passing yards	143	261
Passing: Comp–Att–Int	9–12–0	22–36–1
Time of possession	30:26	29:34

Team	Category	Player	Statistics
Old Dominion	Passing	Quinn Henicle	9/12, 143 yards, 2 TD
Old Dominion	Rushing	Quinn Henicle	19 carries, 206 yards, 2 TD
Old Dominion	Receiving	Pat Conroy	4 receptions, 90 yards, 2 TD
Arkansas State	Passing	Jaylen Raynor	22/36, 261 yards, 3 TD, INT
Arkansas State	Rushing	Zak Wallace	15 carries, 89 yards, TD
Arkansas State	Receiving	Corey Rucker	8 receptions, 115 yards, TD

=== Bowling Green (68 Ventures Bowl) ===
2024 68 Ventures Bowl
Arkansas State Red Wolves (7–5) at Bowling Green Falcons (7–5) – Game summary

Quarter	1	2	3	4	Total
Red Wolves	17	7	7	7	38
Falcons	7	14	3	7	31

at Hancock Whitney Stadium • Mobile, Alabama

- Date: Thursday, December 26, 2024
- Game time: 8:00 p.m.
- Game weather: Overcast • Temperature: 59 °F (15 °C) • Wind: E at 9 miles per hour (14 km/h)
- Game attendance: 19,582
- Referee: Garrett Dickerson
- TV announcers (ESPN): Clay Matvick (play-by-play), Roddy Jones (analyst), and Ashley Stroehlein (sideline)

Game information

First Quarter

- (9:57) ARST – Clune Van Andel 46 yard field goal (Drive: 13 plays, 46 yards, 5:03; Arkansas State 3–0)
- (8:02) ARST – Courtney Jackson 60 yard punt return, Clune Van Andel kick (Drive: 3 plays, -2 yards, 1:51; Arkansas State 10–0)
- (4:04) BGSU – Malcolm Johnson Jr. 43 yard pass from Baron May, Zach Long kick (Drive: 7 plays, 75 yards, 3:58; Arkansas State 10–7)
- (1:39) ARST – Jaylen Raynor 5 yard run, Clune Van Andel kick (Drive: 8 plays, 75 yards, 2:25; Arkansas State 17–7)

Second Quarter

- (6:46) BGSU – Jaison Patterson 8 yard pass from Connor Bazelak, Zach Long kick (Drive: 8 plays, 77 yards, 4:22; Arkansas State 17–14)
- (4:13) ARST – Corey Rucker 79 yard pass from Jaylen Raynor, Clune Van Andel kick (Drive: 5 plays, 93 yards, 2:30; Arkansas State 24–14)
- (1:36) BGSU – Harold Fannin Jr. 4 yard pass from Connor Bazelak, Zach Long kick (Drive: 7 plays, 75 yards, 2:37; Arkansas State 24–21)

Third Quarter

- (11:21) ARST – Corey Rucker 6 yard pass from Jaylen Raynor, Clune Van Andel kick (Drive: 6 plays, 34 yards, 3:19; Arkansas State 31–21)
- (6:14) BGSU – Zach Long 38 yard field goal (Drive: 13 plays, 55 yards, 5:07; Arkansas State 31–24)

Fourth Quarter

- (3:10) ARST – Zak Wallace 14 yard run, Clune Van Andel kick (Drive: 8 plays, 68 yards, 4:43; Arkansas State 38–24)
- (1:42) BGSU – Rahkeem Smith 23 yard pass from Connor Bazelak, Zach Long kick (Drive: 5 plays, 38 yards, 1:17; Arkansas State 38–31)

Statistics	ARST	BGSU
First downs	20	22
Plays–yards	63–360	74–479
Rushes–yards	32–128	24–46
Passing yards	232	433
Passing: Comp–Att–Int	19–31–1	33–50–0
Time of possession	27:25	32:35

Team	Category	Player	Statistics
Arkansas State	Passing	Jaylen Raynor	18/30, 221 yards, 2 TD, INT
Arkansas State	Rushing	Zak Wallace	15 carries, 99 yards, TD
Arkansas State	Receiving	Corey Rucker	4 receptions, 107 yards, 2 TD
Bowling Green	Passing	Connor Bazelak	32/49, 390 yards, 3 TD
Bowling Green	Rushing	Jaison Patterson	5 carries, 15 yards
Bowling Green	Receiving	Harold Fannin Jr.	17 receptions, 213 yards, TD
