= Emmett Morehead =

American football player

No. 9
- Position: Quarterback

Personal information
- Born: September 19, 2002 (age 24)
- Listed height: 6 ft 5 in (1.96 m)
- Listed weight: 235 lb (107 kg)

Career information
- High school: Episcopal (Alexandria, Virginia)
- College: Boston College (2021–2023); Old Dominion (2024); Minnesota (2025)
- Stats at ESPN

Emmett Morehead is an American former college football quarterback. He played for the Boston College Eagles, the Old Dominion Monarchs, and the Minnesota Golden Gophers.

== Early life ==
Morehead grew up in Woodside, California and attended Episcopal High School in Alexandria, Virginia where he lettered in football, basketball and baseball. He was rated a three-star recruit and committed to play college football at Boston College over offers from Appalachian State, Buffalo, Kentucky, Old Dominion, Pittsburgh, Richmond, Virginia Tech, West Virginia and Yale.

== College career ==
=== Boston College ===
During Morehead's true freshman season in 2021, he played in two games under center and was redshirted. He finished the season with completing six out of 16 passing attempts for 87 yards. During the 2022 season, he played in 10 games and started four of them. He finished the season with completing 104 out of 173 passing attempts for 1,165 yards with nine touchdowns and six interceptions.

During the 2023 season, Morehead started the first game of the season and completed four out of 10 completed passing attempts for 30 yards. Morehead entered the transfer portal on December 2, 2023.

=== Old Dominion ===
On May 6, 2024, Morehead announced that he was transferring to Old Dominion.

On December 10, 2024, Morehead announced that he would enter the transfer portal for the second time.

=== Statistics ===
Year	Team	GP	Passing								Rushing			
Year	Team	GP	Comp	Att	Pct	Yards	Avg	TD	Int	Rate	Att	Yards	Avg	TD
2021	Boston College	2	6	16	37.5	87	5.4	0	0	83.2	9	−29	−3.2	0
2022	Boston College	10	115	192	59.9	1,254	6.5	10	6	125.7	43	−22	−0.5	0
2023	Boston College	4	15	30	50.0	124	4.1	0	0	84.7	2	8	4.0	0
2024	Old Dominion	0	Did not play											
2025	Minnesota	0	Did not play											
Career		16	136	238	57.1	1,465	6.2	10	6	117.7	54	−43	−0.8	0
