= 2024 Old Dominion Monarchs football team =

American college football season

2024 Old Dominion Monarchs football
- Conference: Sun Belt Conference
- East Division
- Record: 5–7 (4–4 Sun Belt)
- Head coach: Ricky Rahne (5th season)
- Offensive coordinator: Kevin Decker (2nd season)
- Offensive scheme: Veer and shoot
- Defensive coordinator: Blake Seiler (5th season)
- Base defense: 3–2–6
- Home stadium: S.B. Ballard Stadium

2024 Sun Belt Conference football standings
	Conf.			Overall
Team	W		L	W		L
East Division
Marshall xy$	7	–	1	10	–	3
Georgia Southern	6	–	2	8	–	5
James Madison	4	–	4	9	–	4
Old Dominion	4	–	4	5	–	7
Coastal Carolina	3	–	5	6	–	7
Appalachian State	3	–	5	5	–	6
Georgia State	1	–	7	3	–	9
West Division
Louisiana xy	7	–	1	10	–	4
Texas State	5	–	3	8	–	5
Arkansas State	5	–	3	8	–	5
South Alabama	5	–	3	7	–	6
Louisiana–Monroe	3	–	5	5	–	7
Troy	3	–	5	4	–	8
Southern Miss	0	–	8	1	–	11
Championship: Marshall 31, Louisiana 3
$ – Conference champion; x – Division champion/co-champions; y – Championship game participant

The 2024 Old Dominion Monarchs football team represented Old Dominion University in the Sun Belt Conference's East Division during the 2024 NCAA Division I FBS football season. The Monarchs were led by Ricky Rahne in his fifth year as the head coach. The Monarchs played their home games at S.B. Ballard Stadium, located in Norfolk, Virginia.

== Preseason ==
=== Media poll ===
In the Sun Belt preseason coaches' poll, the Monarchs were picked to finish sixth place in the East division.

Linebacker Jason Henderson was named the Preseason Defensive Player of the Year for the second year in a row and was awarded to be in the preseason All-Sun Belt first team defense for the third year in a row. Defensive lineman Denzel Lowry was named to the second team.

== Schedule ==
The football schedule was announced on March 1, 2024.

Date	Time	Opponent	Site	TV	Result	Attendance
August 31	4:15 p.m.	at South Carolina*	Williams–Brice Stadium; Columbia, SC	SECN	L 19–23	78,496
September 7	6:00 p.m.	East Carolina*	S.B. Ballard Stadium; Norfolk, VA	ESPN+	L 14–20	21,944
September 14	6:00 p.m.	Virginia Tech*	S.B. Ballard Stadium; Norfolk, VA	ESPN+	L 17–37	22,208
September 28	5:00 p.m.	at Bowling Green*	Doyt Perry Stadium; Bowling Green, OH	ESPN+	W 30–27	19,140
October 5	7:00 p.m.	at Coastal Carolina	Brooks Stadium; Conway, SC	ESPN+	L 37–45	18,552
October 12	3:30 p.m.	at Georgia State	Center Parc Stadium; Atlanta, GA	ESPN+	W 21–14	12,280
October 19	3:30 p.m.	Texas State^{†}	S.B. Ballard Stadium; Norfolk, VA	ESPN+	W 24–14	19,129
October 24	7:00 p.m.	Georgia Southern	S.B. Ballard Stadium; Norfolk, VA	ESPN2	W 47–19	18,281
November 2	2:30 p.m.	at Appalachian State	Kidd Brewer Stadium; Boone, NC	ESPN+	L 20–28	34,954
November 16	4:00 p.m.	James Madison	S.B. Ballard Stadium; Norfolk, VA (Royal Rivalry)	ESPNU	L 32–35	21,984
November 23	7:30 p.m.	Marshall	S.B. Ballard Stadium; Norfolk, VA (Oyster Bowl)	ESPNU	L 35–42	18,083
November 30	3:00 p.m.	at Arkansas State	Centennial Bank Stadium; Jonesboro, AR	ESPN+	W 40–32	13,584
*Non-conference game; ^{†}Homecoming; Rankings from AP Poll and CFP Rankings released prior to game; All times are in Eastern time

== Personnel ==
=== Transfers ===
Outgoing
Player	Position	New school
Jalen Satchell	DL	Michigan State
Ahmarian Granger	WR	James Madison
Christopher Adams	OT	Memphis
Jack Shields	QB	Buffalo
Reymello Murphy	WR	Arizona
Devin Brandt-Epps	DL	New Mexico
LaMareon James	CB	TCU
Tahj Ra-El	S	Memphis
Wayne Matthews III	LB	Michigan State
Javon Harvey	WR	Duke
Shawn Asbury II	S	Indiana
Terry Jones	S	Indiana
Kadarius Calloway	RB	California
Mason Howard	IOL	Wofford
Gideon Bedada	EDGE	Murray State
Trenton Kintigh	DL	Wofford
Charles Yates Jr.	CB	Liberty
BJ Lowery Jr.	CB	Sacred Heart
Malcom Britt	LB	Norfolk State
Jordan Bly	WR	Gardner–Webb
Marquez Bell	WR	Florida A&M
Ethan Duane	P	Buffalo

Incoming
Player	Position	Previous school
Ricardo Williams Jr.	DL	Georgia State
Emmett Morehead	QB	Boston College
Diante Vines	WR	Iowa
Pat Conroy	TE	Merrimack
Aaron Young	RB	Rutgers
Will Jones II	S	South Florida
Bryce Duke	RB	Virginia Tech
Patrick Smith-Young	S	North Texas
Zachary Barlev	OT	Illinois
Angelo Rankin Jr.	CB	Richmond
Anthony Patt	OT	Arizona
Dallas Sims	WR	Minnesota
Rick Moore	OT	Boise State
Colin Henrich	IOL	Georgia State
Justin McKithen	CB	Florida Atlantic
Seth Naotala	LB	James Madison
Nate Hartman	TE	Newberry
Dywan Griffin	CB	UTSA

- Source: ON3, 247Sports

=== Recruiting class ===
College recruiting
Name	Hometown	School	Height	Weight	40^{‡}	Commit date
Jerome Carter III; S	Lake City, FL	Columbia HS	6 ft 0 in (1.83 m)	175 lb (79 kg)	–	Dec 20, 2023
Jerome Carter III; S	Recruit ratings: Rivals: 247Sports: ESPN: (74)					

=== Roster ===
2024 Old Dominion Monarchs football team roster
Players
Coaches
Offense

Pos.	#	Name	Class
WR	0	Diante Vines	Sr
WR	1	Isiah Paige	Sr
QB	2	Colton Joseph	Fr
RB	3	Devin Roche	Fr
RB	4	Bryce Duke	Jr
RB	5	Aaron Young	Sr
WR	6	Kelby Williams	Jr
QB	7	Grant Wilson	Jr
WR	8	Myles Alston	Jr
TE	9	Jalen Butler	Jr
QB	10	Quinn Henicle	Fr
WR	11	Dominic Dutton	Jr
WR	12	TJ Lott	Fr
WR	13	Demariyon Houston	Sr
QB	14	Emmett Morehead	Jr
TE	15	Pat Conroy	Sr
QB	16	Holden Brown	Fr
WR	17	Na'eem Gladding	Fr
WR	18	Fidel Tau Pitts	Jr
WR	19	Jaylen Pretlow	Fr
RB	22	Maurki James	Fr
RB	26	Tariq Sims	Jr
RB	40	Troy Marquez	Fr
OL	51	Michael Flores	Sr
OL	55	Maarten Woudsma	So
OL	58	Stephon Dubose-Borne	Jr
OL	59	Caleb Bryant	Fr
OL	60	Spencer Dow	Fr
OL	61	Jake Scala	Fr
OL	62	Billy Gough	Jr
OL	64	Zach Barlev	Jr
OL	67	Kainan Miller	Fr
OL	68	Jadon Furubotten	Jr
OL	70	Rick Moore	Jr
OL	71	Santana Saunders	Sr
OL	72	Colin Henrich	Sr
OL	73	Connor Drake	Fr
OL	74	Anthony Patt	Jr
OL	75	Skyler Grant	Jr
OL	76	Josh Schuetzmann	Fr
OL	77	Keanon McNally	So
OL	78	Elijah Hoskin	Jr
OL	79	Theo Bachelder	Fr
TE	80	DJ Chandler	Jr
TE	84	Quan Dunbar	Fr
WR	85	Dallas Sims	Fr
TE	86	Kyle Miller	So
TE	87	Trey Lancaster	Sr
TE	89	Nate Hartman	So

Defense

Pos.	#	Name	Class
CB	0	Angelo Rankin Jr.	Sr
LB	1	EJ Green	Sr
S	2	Patrick Smith-Young	So
S	3	Mario Easterly	So
DE	4	Amorie Morrison	Jr
S	5	Jahron Manning	Jr
CB	6	Rasheed Reason	Sr
S	7	Will Jones II	Sr
DT	8	Denzel Lowry	Jr
CB	9	Jordan Holmes	Fr
LB	10	Koa Naotala	So
LB	11	Ny'Len Ramon Jones	Jr
S	12	Jerome Carter	Fr
S	13	Jed Olotu-Judah	Fr
LB	14	Taysean Stevenson	Fr
S	15	Ashton Whitner	So
CB	16	Khian'Dre Harris	Jr
LB	18	Mario Thompson	So
S	19	Jeremy Mack Jr.	Jr
CB	20	Langston Williams	Jr
S	21	Zion Frink	Fr
CB	22	Justin McKithen	Sr
CB	23	Dywan Griffin	Sr
LB	24	Dirrick Goodman	Fr
CB	25	Brandon Crutchfield	Fr
S	26	JC Cloutier	Fr
CB	27	Ryan Ramey	So
DB	28	Chris Boykins	Fr
S	29	Markus Knight	Jr
CB	30	Jordan Saunders	Fr
LB	31	Michael Devereaux	Jr
LB	32	Ja'Mez Drummer	Jr
S	33	Daevon Iles	Fr
LB	34	Jahleel Culbreath	So
S	35	Zach Hagedon	Fr
CB	36	Quedrion Miles	So
CB	37	Caleb Bishop	Fr
LB	38	Seth Naotala	Jr
S	39	Ricardo Underwood	Fr
LB	41	Gage Sawyers	Fr
LB	42	Jason Henderson	Sr
DE	43	Kris Trinidad	Jr
LB	44	AJ Ashworth	Fr
DL	50	Chris Forbes	Fr
DL	52	Jonathan Bacigalupi	Jr
DL	53	Idrissa Kamara	Fr
DT	54	Jackson Banks	So
DE	56	Jaylon White-McClain	So
OL	65	Exodus Anderson	Fr
DL	75	Lorenzo McFadden-Pressley	Fr
DL	90	DeAndre Lynch	Fr
DT	91	Ricardo Williams Jr.	Sr
DL	95	Ahmaad Foster	Fr
DL	98	Christopher Spencer	So
DT	99	Cole Daniels	Jr

Special teams

Pos.	#	Name	Class
LS	45	Brock Walters	So
K	49	Ethan Chang	Sr
LS	57	Ryan Harvey	Sr
K	92	Ethan Sanchez	Jr
K	93	Nathanial Eichner	So
LS	94	Brandon Richards	Sr
P	96	Ian Brandt	Fr
P	97	Seamus Hall	Sr

Head coach

- Ricky Rahne (Cornell)

Coordinators/assistant coaches

- Kevin Decker
  Offensive coordinator/quarterbacks
- Blake Seiler
  Defensive coordinator/inside linebackers
- Kevin Smith
  Special teams coordinator/outside linebackers
- Alex Huettel
  Offensive line
- Victor Irokansi
  Defensive line
- Tony Lucas
  Running backs/asst. head coach
- Remington Rebstock
  Safeties/asst. defensive coordinator
- Kody Cook
  Wide receivers
- Tarron Williams
  Cornerbacks
- David Weeks
  Tight ends
- Chad Snodgrass
  Director of sports performance
- Tristan Iannone
  Director of operations

Legend

- (C) Team captain
- (S) Suspended
- (I) Ineligible
- Injured
- Redshirt

Roster

== Game summaries ==
=== at South Carolina ===
Old Dominion Monarchs (0–0) at South Carolina Gamecocks (0–0) – Game summary

Quarter	1	2	3	4	Total
Monarchs	7	0	9	3	19
Gamecocks	10	3	3	7	23

at Williams–Brice Stadium • Columbia, SC

- Date: August 31, 2024
- Game time: 4:15 p.m. (EDT)
- Game weather: Partly Cloudy • Temperature: 90 °F (32 °C) • Wind: E at 3 miles per hour (4.8 km/h)
- Game attendance: 78,496
- TV announcers (SECN): Dave Neal (play-by-play), Aaron Murray (analyst), Ashley ShahAhmadi (sideline reporter)

Game information

First quarter

- (13:22) SCAR – Raheim Sanders 1 yard rush, Alex Herrera kick (Drive: 3 plays, 3 yards, 0:50; SCAR 7–0)
- (12:51) ODU – Isiah Paige 72 yard pass from Grant Wilson, Ethan Sanchez kick (Drive: 2 plays, 75 yards, 0:31; Tied 7–7)
- (6:09) SCAR – Alex Herrera 40 yard field goal (Drive: 13 plays, 53 yards, 6:42; SCAR 10–7)

Second quarter

- (4:02) SCAR – Alex Herrera 46 yard field goal (Drive: 5 plays, 13 yards, 2:04; SCAR 13–7)

Third quarter

- (7:13) SCAR – Alex Herrera 33 yard field goal (Drive: 16 plays, 60 yards, 7:47; SCAR 16–7)
- (4:57) ODU – Grant Wilson 36 yard rush, Ethan Sanchez kick blocked (Drive: 9 plays, 75 yards, 2:16; SCAR 16–13)
- (0:14) ODU – Ethan Sanchez 40 yard field goal (Drive: 8 plays, 47 yards, 1:49; Tied 16–16)

Fourth quarter

- (9:54) ODU – Ethan Sanchez 33 yard field goal (Drive: 13 plays, 42 yards, 4:19; ODU 19–16)
- (6:11) SCAR – LaNorris Sellers 1 yard rush, Alex Herrera kick (Drive: 2 plays, 6 yards, 0:37; SCAR 23–19)

Statistics	ODU	SCAR
First downs	17	18
Total yards	305	288
Rushing yards	108	174
Passing yards	197	114
Passing: Comp–Att–Int	22–38–2	10–23–0
Time of possession	24:14	35:46

Team	Category	Player	Statistics
Old Dominion	Passing	Grant Wilson	22/38, 197 yards, 1 TD, 2 INT
Old Dominion	Rushing	Aaron Young	16 carries, 56 yards
Old Dominion	Receiving	Isiah Paige	8 receptions, 115 yards, 1 TD
South Carolina	Passing	LaNorris Sellers	10/23, 114 yards
South Carolina	Rushing	Raheim Sanders	24 carries, 88 yards, 1 TD
South Carolina	Receiving	Vandrevius Jacobs	2 receptions, 59 yards

=== vs East Carolina ===
East Carolina Pirates (1–0) vs Old Dominion Monarchs (0–1) – Game summary

Quarter	1	2	3	4	Total
Pirates	6	0	11	3	20
Monarchs	0	7	7	0	14

at S.B. Ballard Stadium • Norfolk, VA

- Date: September 7, 2024
- Game time: 6:00 p.m. (EDT)
- Game weather: Cloudy • Temperature: 77 °F (25 °C) • Wind: SW at 8 miles per hour (13 km/h)
- Game attendance: 21,944
- Referee: Edwin Lee
- TV announcers (ESPN+): Chip Tarkenton (play-by-play), Andy Mashaw (analyst)

Game information

First quarter

- (11:45) ECU – Rahjai Harris 22 yard run, kick failed (Drive: 10 plays, 80 yards, 3:10; ECU 6–0)

Second quarter

- (9:24) ODU – Kelby Williams 44 yard pass from Grant Wilson, Ethan Sanchez kick (Drive: 1 play, 34 yards, 0:35; ODU 7–6)

Third quarter

- (10:42) ECU – Rahjai Harris 63 yard run, Two-point pass conversion (Drive: 5 plays, 80 yards, 1:48; ECU 14–7)
- (9:07) ECU – Andrew Conrad 33 yard field goal (Drive: 4 plays, 5 yards, 1:32; ECU 17–7)
- (4:11) ODU – Aaron Young 1 yard run, Ethan Sanchez kick (Drive: 13 plays, 75 yards, 4:56; ECU 17–14)

Fourth quarter

- (9:09) ECU – Andrew Conrad 50 yard field goal (Drive: 8 plays, 21 yards, 2:54; ECU 20–14)

Statistics	ECU	ODU
First downs	26	17
Plays–yards	89–466	75–287
Rushes–yards	51–183	41–95
Passing yards	283	192
Passing: Comp–Att–Int	25–38–4	20–34–1
Time of possession	32:47	27:13

Team	Category	Player	Statistics
East Carolina	Passing	Jake Garcia	25/38, 283 yards, 4 INT
East Carolina	Rushing	Rahjai Harris	26 carries, 131 yards, 2 TD
East Carolina	Receiving	Anthony Smith	5 receptions, 70 yards
Old Dominion	Passing	Grant Wilson	20/34, 192 yards, 1 TD, 1 INT
Old Dominion	Rushing	Aaron Young	25 carries, 83 yards, 1 TD
Old Dominion	Receiving	Diante Vines	6 receptions, 64 yards

=== vs Virginia Tech ===
Virginia Tech Hokies (1–1) vs Old Dominion Monarchs (0–2) – Game summary

Quarter	1	2	3	4	Total
Hokies	14	0	6	17	37
Monarchs	0	10	0	7	17

at S.B. Ballard Stadium • Norfolk, VA

- Date: September 14, 2024
- Game time: 6:00 p.m. (EDT)
- Game weather: Cloudy • Temperature: 75 °F (24 °C) • Wind: NE at 15 miles per hour (24 km/h)
- Game attendance: 22,208
- TV announcers (ESPN+): Chip Tarkenton (play-by-play), Andy Mashaw (analyst)

Game information

First quarter

- (12:05) VT – Jaylin Lane 25-yard pass from Kyron Drones, John Love kick (Drive: 7 plays, 76 yards, 2:51; VT 7–0)
- (5:50) VT – Kyron Drones 1-yard run, John Love kick (Drive: 7 plays, 80 yards, 3:29; VT 14–0)

Second quarter

- (13:13) ODU – Quinn Henicle 65-yard run, Ethan Sanchez kick (Drive: 1 play, 65 yards, 0:10; VT 14–7)
- (5:14) ODU – Ethan Sanchez 28-yard field goal (Drive: 6 plays, 69 yards, 2:50; VT 14–10)

Third quarter

- (10:43) VT – John Love 21-yard field goal (Drive: 6 plays, 68 yards, 2:55; VT 17–10)
- (8:07) VT – John Love 32-yard field goal (Drive: 4 plays, 3 yards, 1:05; VT 20–10)

Fourth quarter

- (14:55) VT – Bhayshul Tuten 16-yard run, John Love kick (Drive: 8 plays, 59 yards, 4:16; VT 27–10)
- (10:10) VT – Bhayshul Tuten 22-yard run, John Love kick (Drive: 7 plays, 48 yards, 3:51; VT 34–10)
- (5:08) VT – John Love 41-yard field goal (Drive: 7 plays, 18 yards, 3:53; VT 37–10)
- (3:32) ODU – Tariq Sims 16-yard run, Ethan Sanchez kick (Drive: 6 plays, 75 yards, 1:36; VT 37–17)

Statistics	VT	ODU
First downs	22	11
Total yards	465	293
Rushing yards	289	243
Passing yards	176	50
Passing: Comp–Att–Int	15–26–1	6–14–1
Time of possession	37:50	22:10

Team	Category	Player	Statistics
Virginia Tech	Passing	Kyron Drones	15/26, 176 yards, 1 TD, 1 INT
Virginia Tech	Rushing	Kyron Drones	12 carries, 117 yards, 1 TD
Virginia Tech	Receiving	Jaylin Lane	7 receptions, 106 yards, 1TD
Old Dominion	Passing	Quinn Henicle	5/12, 38 yards, 1 INT
Old Dominion	Rushing	Bryce Duke	4 carries, 85 yards
Old Dominion	Receiving	Isiah Paige	2 receptions, 18 yards

=== at Bowling Green ===
Old Dominion Monarchs (0–3) at Bowling Green Falcons (1–2) – Game summary

Quarter	1	2	3	4	Total
Monarchs	14	3	0	13	30
Falcons	7	7	7	6	27

at Doyt Perry Stadium • Bowling Green, OH

- Date: September 28, 2024
- Game time: 5:00 p.m. (EDT)
- Game weather: Cloudy/Light rain • Temperature: 67 °F (19 °C) • Wind: SSW at 10 miles per hour (16 km/h)
- Game attendance: 19,140
- Referee: Steven Robinson
- TV announcers (ESPN+): Jason Ross Jr. (play-by-play) and Tyoka Jackson (analyst)

Game information

First quarter

- (11:57) ODU – Pat Conroy 9 yard pass from Grant Wilson, Ethan Sanchez kick (Drive: 8 plays, 75 yards, 3:03; ODU 7–0)
- (0:31) BGSU – Harold Fannin Jr. 18 yard pass from Connor Bazelak, Jackson Kleather kick (Drive: 10 plays, 76 yards, 5:19; Tied 7–7)
- (0:20) ODU – Pat Conroy 75 yard pass from Grant Wilson, Ethan Sanchez kick (Drive: 1 play, 75 yards, 0:11; ODU 14–7)

Second quarter

- (10:22) BGSU – Jaison Patterson 17 yard run, Jackson Kleather kick (Drive: 9 plays, 81 yards, 4:54; Tied 14–14)
- (8:33) ODU – Ethan Sanchez 53 yard field goal (Drive: 7 plays, 39 yards, 1:49; ODU 17–14)

Third quarter

- (11:34) BGSU – Harold Fannin Jr. 59 yard pass from Connor Bazelak, Jackson Kleather kick (Drive: 2 plays, 59 yards, 0:56; BGSU 21–17)

Fourth quarter

- (11:57) ODU – Colton Joseph 14 yard run, Ethan Sanchez kick failed (Drive: 2 plays, 20 yards, 0:42; ODU 23–21)
- (3:01) BGSU – Terion Stewart 13 yard run, Two-point conversion failed (Drive: 8 plays, 44 yards, 5:06; BGSU 27–23)
- (0:24) ODU – Aaron Young 4 yard run, Ethan Sanchez kick (Drive: 13 plays, 79 yards, 2:31; ODU 30–27)

Statistics	ODU	BGSU
First downs	16	23
Total yards	333	399
Rushing yards	189	96
Passing yards	144	303
Passing: Comp–Att–Int	12–27–0	27–36–1
Time of possession	21:44	38:16

Team	Category	Player	Statistics
Old Dominion	Passing	Grant Wilson	6/14, 118 yards, 2 TD
Old Dominion	Rushing	Aaron Young	12 carries, 74 yards, 1 TD
Old Dominion	Receiving	Pat Conroy	3 receptions, 99 yards, 2 TD
Bowling Green	Passing	Connor Bazelak	27/36, 303 yards, 2 TD, 1 INT
Bowling Green	Rushing	Terion Stewart	20 carries, 67 yards, 1 TD
Bowling Green	Receiving	Harold Fannin Jr.	12 receptions, 188 yards, 2 TD

=== at Coastal Carolina ===
Old Dominion Monarchs (1–3) at Coastal Carolina Chanticleers (3–1) – Game summary

Quarter	1	2	3	4	Total
Monarchs	7	10	7	13	37
Chanticleers	7	14	14	10	45

at Brooks Stadium • Conway, SC

- Date: October 5, 2024
- Game time: 7:00 p.m. (EDT)
- Game weather: Sunny • Temperature: 76 °F (24 °C) • Wind: ESE at 3 miles per hour (4.8 km/h)
- Game attendance: 18,552
- Referee: Trennis Livingston
- TV announcers (ESPN+): Jeff McCarragher (play-by-play), Nate Ross (analyst) and Joanne Bethea (sideline)

Game information

First quarter

- (3:39) ODU – Bryce Duke 10-yard pass from Colton Joseph, Ethan Sanchez kick (Drive: 12 plays, 86 yards, 4:42; ODU 7–0)
- (0:45) CCU – Cane Berrong 8-yard pass from Ethan Vasko, Kade Hensley kick (Drive: 5 plays, 75 yards, 2:54; Tied 7–7)

Second quarter

- (9:58) ODU – Ethan Sanchez 26-yard field goal (Drive: 10 plays, 40 yards, 5:43; ODU 10–7)
- (4:26) ODU – Isiah Paige 55-yard pass from Colton Joseph, Ethan Sanchez kick (Drive: 5 plays, 68 yards, 1:47; ODU 17–7)
- (2:15) CCU – Cameron Wright 12-yard pass from Ethan Vasko, Kade Hensley kick (Drive: 3 plays, 75 yards, 2:11; ODU 17–14)
- (1:48) CCU – Juan Powell 23-yard fumble recovery, Kade Hensley kick (CCU 21–17)

Third quarter

- (13:02) CCU – Braydon Bennett 9-yard run, Kade Hensley kick (Drive: 5 plays, 80 yards, 1:53; CCU 28–17)
- (3:08) CCU – Braydon Bennett 4-yard run, Kade Hensley kick (Drive: 8 plays, 29 yards, 3:50; CCU 35–17)
- (0:54) ODU – Diante Vines 40-yard pass from Colton Joseph, Ethan Sanchez kick (Drive: 7 plays, 65 yards, 2:14; CCU 35–24)

Fourth quarter

- (10:44) ODU – Devin Roche 1-yard run (Drive: 9 plays, 78 yards, 3:03; CCU 35–30)
- (7:56) CCU – Braydon Bennett 37-yard pass from Ethan Vasko, Kade Hensley kick (Drive: 7 plays, 75 yards, 2:48; CCU 42–30)
- (2:47) CCU – Kade Hensley 46-yard field goal (Drive: 10 plays, 33 yards, 4:21; CCU 45–30)
- (0:29) ODU – Colton Joseph 1-yard run, Ethan Sanchez kick (Drive: 12 plays, 75 yards, 2:18; CCU 45–37)

Statistics	ODU	CCU
First downs	25	18
Total yards	462	515
Rushing yards	200	148
Passing yards	262	367
Passing: Comp–Att–Int	22–40–1	19–26–0
Time of possession	25:59	34:01

Team	Category	Player	Statistics
Old Dominion	Passing	Colton Joseph	22/40, 262 yards, 3 TD, INT
Old Dominion	Rushing	Devin Roche	12 carries, 86 yards, TD
Old Dominion	Receiving	Isiah Page	8 receptions, 81 yards, TD
Coastal Carolina	Passing	Ethan Vasko	19/26, 367 yards, 3 TD
Coastal Carolina	Rushing	Christian Washington	8 carries, 89 yards
Coastal Carolina	Receiving	Cameron Wright	4 receptions, 148 yards, TD

=== at Georgia State ===
Old Dominion Monarchs (1–4) at Georgia State Panthers (2–2) – Game summary

Quarter	1	2	3	4	Total
Monarchs	7	0	7	7	21
Panthers	0	7	0	7	14

at Center Parc Stadium • Atlanta, GA

- Date: October 12, 2024
- Game time: 3:30 p.m. (EDT)
- Game weather: Sunny • Temperature: 79 °F (26 °C) • Wind: WNW at 9 miles per hour (14 km/h)
- Game attendance: 12,280
- Referee: Marshall Lewis
- TV announcers (ESPN+): Matt Stewart (play-by-play) and Sam Crenshaw (analyst)

Game information

First quarter

- (1:17) ODU – Devin Roche 4-yard run, Ethan Sanchez kick (Drive: 9 plays, 78 yards, 4:15; ODU 7–0)

Second quarter

- (10:25) GSU – Ted Hurst 20-yard pass from Christian Veilleux, Liam Rickman kick (Drive: 9 plays, 75 yards, 3:38; Tied 7–7)

Third quarter

- (2:38) ODU – Tariq Sims 6-yard run, Ethan Sanchez kick (Drive: 10 plays, 59 yards, 4:48; ODU 14–7)

Fourth quarter

- (13:08) ODU – Demariyon Houston 9-yard pass from Colton Joseph, Ethan Sanchez kick (Drive: 7 plays, 74 yards, 3:27; ODU 21–7)
- (2:19) GSU – Freddie Brock 24-yard pass from Zach Gibson, Liam Rickman kick (Drive: 6 plays, 54 yards, 1:59; ODU 21–14)

Statistics	ODU	GAST
First downs	18	19
Total yards	343	317
Rushing yards	202	57
Passing yards	141	260
Passing: Comp–Att–Int	14–23–1	28–46–1
Time of possession	32:45	27:15

Team	Category	Player	Statistics
Old Dominion	Passing	Colton Joseph	14/23, 141 yards, TD, INT
Old Dominion	Rushing	Colton Joseph	11 carries, 98 yards
Old Dominion	Receiving	Pat Conroy	7 receptions, 61 yards
Georgia State	Passing	Christian Veilleux	22/40, 211 yards, TD, INT
Georgia State	Rushing	Freddie Brock	12 carries, 40 yards
Georgia State	Receiving	Ted Hurst	6 receptions, 85 yards, TD

=== vs Texas State ===
Texas State Bobcats (4–2) vs Old Dominion Monarchs (2–4) – Game summary

Quarter	1	2	3	4	Total
Bobcats	0	0	7	7	14
Monarchs	7	7	0	10	24

at S.B. Ballard Stadium (Homecoming) • Norfolk, VA

- Date: October 19, 2024
- Game time: 3:30 p.m. (EDT)
- Game weather: Sunny • Temperature: 68 °F (20 °C) • Wind: NE 10 miles per hour (16 km/h)
- Game attendance: 19,129
- Referee: Steven Robinson
- TV announcers (ESPN+): Chip Tarkenton (play-by-play) and Andy Mashaw (analyst)

Game information

First quarter

- (2:42) ODU – Colton Joseph 4-yard run, Ethan Sanchez kick (Drive: 5 plays, 18 yards, 1:47; ODU 7–0)

Second quarter

- (5:08) ODU – Colton Joseph 11-yard run, Ethan Sanchez kick (Drive: 11 plays, 59 yards, 5:29; ODU 14–0)

Third quarter

- (7:34) TXST – Jordan McCloud 7-yard run, Mason Shipley kick (Drive: 4 plays, 52 yards, 1:53; ODU 14–7)

Fourth quarter

- (9:43) ODU – Ethan Sanchez 32-yard field goal (Drive: 10 plays, 49 yards, 4:07; ODU 17–7)
- (5:16) TXST – Beau Sparks 24-yard pass from Jordan McCloud, Mason Shipley kick (Drive: 11 plays, 71 yards, 4:22; ODU 17–14)
- (1:19) ODU – Colton Joseph 28-yard run, Ethan Sanchez kick (Drive: 8 plays, 75 yards, 3:57; ODU 24–14)

Statistics	TXST	ODU
First downs	23	18
Total yards	359	322
Rushing yards	186	192
Passing yards	173	130
Passing: Comp–Att–Int	17–33–2	15–28–0
Time of possession	31:16	28:44

Team	Category	Player	Statistics
Texas State	Passing	Jordan McCloud	17/33, 173 yards, TD, 2 INT
Texas State	Rushing	Ismail Mahdi	25 carries, 139 yards
Texas State	Receiving	Joey Hobert	6 receptions, 88 yards
Old Dominion	Passing	Colton Joseph	15/28, 130 yards
Old Dominion	Rushing	Colton Joseph	16 carries, 111 yards, 3 TD
Old Dominion	Receiving	Isiah Paige	6 receptions, 36 yards

=== vs Georgia Southern ===
Georgia Southern Eagles (5–2) vs Old Dominion Monarchs (3–4) – Game summary

Quarter	1	2	3	4	Total
Eagles	0	7	6	6	19
Monarchs	13	17	14	3	47

at S.B. Ballard Stadium • Norfolk, VA

- Date: October 24, 2024
- Game time: 7:00 p.m. (EDT)
- Game weather: Clear • Temperature: 65 °F (18 °C) • Wind: NNW 5 miles per hour (8.0 km/h)
- Game attendance: 18,281
- Referee: Ted Pitts
- TV announcers (ESPN2): Jay Alter (play-by-play) and Rocky Boiman (analyst)

Game information

First quarter

- (8:07) ODU – Devin Roche 8-yard pass from Colton Joseph, Ethan Sanchez kick (Drive: 9 plays, 70 yards, 3:59; ODU 7–0)
- (1:17) ODU – Demariyon Houston 24-yard pass from Colton Joseph, Ethan Sanchez kick blocked (Drive: 11 plays, 82 yards, 5:36; ODU 13–0)

Second quarter

- (13:49) ODU – Pat Conroy 56-yard pass from Colton Joseph, Ethan Sanchez kick (Drive: 1 play, 56 yards, 0:10; ODU 20–0)
- (7:51) GASO – Josh Dallas 59-yard pass from JC French, Gavin Stewart kick (Drive: 3 plays, 62 yards, 0:40; ODU 20–7)
- (3:40) ODU – Ethan Sanchez 29-yard field goal (Drive: 9 plays, 63 yards, 4:11; ODU 23–7)
- (0:46) ODU – Demariyon Houston 7-yard pass from Colton Joseph, Ethan Sanchez kick (Drive: 5 plays, 74 yards, 1:48; ODU 30–7)

Third quarter

- (11:24) ODU – Aaron Young 9-yard run, Ethan Sanchez kick (Drive: 6 plays, 43 yards, 2:58; ODU 37–7)
- (3:24) ODU – Colton Joseph 30-yard run, Ethan Sanchez kick (Drive: 4 plays, 55 yards, 2:02; ODU 44–7)
- (0:24) GASO – Dalen Cobb 55-yard pass from JC French, Gavin Stewart kick failed (Drive: 6 plays, 93 yards, 2:54; ODU 44–13)

Fourth quarter

- (10:37) ODU – Ethan Sanchez 38-yard field goal (Drive: 9 plays, 54 yards, 4:47; ODU 47–13)
- (5:34) GASO – OJ Arnold 4-yard pass from Dexter Williams II, Gavin Stewart kick failed (Drive: 12 plays, 77 yards, 4:57; ODU 47–19)

Statistics	GASO	ODU
First downs	17	26
Total yards	416	560
Rushing yards	113	256
Passing yards	303	304
Passing: Comp–Att–Int	21–36–1	20–27–0
Time of possession	25:08	34:52

Team	Category	Player	Statistics
Georgia Southern	Passing	JC French	17/29, 259 yards, 2 TD, INT
Georgia Southern	Rushing	OJ Arnold	7 carries, 36 yards
Georgia Southern	Receiving	Dalen Cobb	7 receptions, 95 yards, TD
Old Dominion	Passing	Colton Joseph	20/26, 304 yards, 4 TD
Old Dominion	Rushing	Aaron Young	14 carries, 77 yards, TD
Old Dominion	Receiving	Isiah Page	7 receptions, 100 yards

=== at Appalachian State ===
Old Dominion Monarchs (4–4) at Appalachian State Mountaineers (3–4) – Game summary

Quarter	1	2	3	4	Total
Monarchs	3	14	3	0	20
Mountaineers	7	7	7	7	28

at Kidd Brewer Stadium • Boone, NC

- Date: November 2, 2024
- Game time: 2:30 p.m. (EDT)
- Game weather: Sunny • Temperature: 63 °F (17 °C) • Wind: NW 5 miles per hour (8.0 km/h)
- Game attendance: 34,954
- Referee: Marshall Lewis
- TV announcers (ESPN+): David Jackson (play-by-play) and Avery Hall (analyst)

Game information

First quarter

- (10:04) APP – Kaedin Robinson 23-yard pass from Joey Aguilar, Jackson Moore kick (Drive: 7 plays, 93 yards, 3:20; Appalachian State 7–0)
- (4:50) ODU – Ethan Sanchez 25-yard field goal (Drive: 10 plays, 67 yards, 5:14; Appalachian State 7–3)

Second quarter

- (14:21) ODU – Diante Vines 14-yard pass from Colton Joseph, Ethan Sanchez kick (Drive: 7 plays, 67 yards, 3:14; Old Dominion 10–7)
- (4:28) ODU – Isiah Paige 28-yard pass from Colton Joseph, Ethan Sanchez kick (Drive: 9 plays, 90 yards, 5:43; Old Dominion 17–7)
- (3:09) APP – Dalton Stroman 46-yard pass from Joey Aguilar, Jackson Moore kick (Drive: 3 plays, 65 yards, 1:13; Old Dominion 17–14)

Third quarter

- (8:05) APP – Kanen Hamlett 4-yard pass from Joey Aguilar, Jackson Moore kick (Drive: 7 plays, 44 yards, 2:53; Appalachian State 21–17)
- (0:55) ODU – Ethan Sanchez 25-yard field goal (Drive: 14 plays, 67 yards, 7:10; Appalachian State 21–20)

Fourth quarter

- (2:29) APP – Max Drag 11-yard pass from Joey Aguilar, Jackson Moore kick (Drive: 10 plays, 61 yards, 5:06; Appalachian State 28–20)

Statistics	ODU	APP
First downs	26	20
Total yards	498	396
Rushing yards	166	184
Passing yards	332	212
Passing: Comp–Att–Int	27–38–1	13–24–1
Time of possession	31:46	28:14

Team	Category	Player	Statistics
Old Dominion	Passing	Colton Joseph	27/38, 332 yards, 2 TD, INT
Old Dominion	Rushing	Aaron Young	14 carries, 110 yards
Old Dominion	Receiving	Isiah Page	13 receptions, 205 yards, TD
Appalachian State	Passing	Joey Aguilar	13/24, 212 yards, 4 TD, INT
Appalachian State	Rushing	Ahmani Marshall	23 carries, 120 yards
Appalachian State	Receiving	Kaedin Robinson	4 receptions, 78 yards, TD

=== vs James Madison (Royal Rivalry) ===
James Madison Dukes (7–2) vs Old Dominion Monarchs (4–5) – Game summary

Quarter	1	2	3	4	Total
Dukes	7	14	7	7	35
Monarchs	7	17	0	8	32

at S.B. Ballard Stadium • Norfolk, VA

- Date: November 16, 2024
- Game time: 4:00 p.m. (EST)
- Game weather: Cloudy • Temperature: 60 °F (16 °C) • Wind: NW 13 miles per hour (21 km/h)
- Game attendance: 21,984
- Referee: Scott Broadway
- TV announcers (ESPNU): Courtney Lyle (play-by-play) and Rene Ingoglia (analyst)

Game information

First quarter

- (10:49) JMU – Wayne Knight 2-yard run, Noe Ruelas kick (Drive: 8 plays, 70 yards, 4:05; James Madison 7–0)
- (7:10) ODU – Colton Joseph 15-yard run, Ethan Sanchez kick (Drive: 7 plays, 72 yards, 3:33; Tied 7–7)

Second quarter

- (14:19) JMU – Noe Ruelas 39-yard field goal (Drive: 14 plays, 48 yards, 7:44; James Madison 10–7)
- (12:21) JMU – Alonza Barnett III 50-yard run, Gabriel Hollingsworth rush (Drive: 1 play, 50 yards, 0:10; James Madison 18–7)
- (9:22) ODU – Aaron Young 3-yard run, Ethan Sanchez kick (Drive: 1 play, 3 yards, 0:04; James Madison 18–14)
- (3:52) JMU – Noe Ruelas 33-yard field goal (Drive: 5 plays, 15 yards, 1:45; James Madison 21–14)
- (2:13) ODU – Colton Joseph 10-yard run, Ethan Sanchez kick (Drive: 4 plays, 75 yards, 1:39; Tied 21–21)
- (0:00) ODU – Ethan Sanchez 23-yard field goal (Drive: 6 plays, 43 yards, 1:42; Old Dominion 24–21)

Third quarter

- (2:38) JMU – Yamir Knight 68-yard pass from Alonza Barnett III, Noe Ruelas kick (Drive: 4 plays, 91 yards, 1:14; James Madison 28–24)

Fourth quarter

- (2:30) JMU – Alonza Barnett III 8-yard run, Noe Ruelas kick (Drive: 12 plays, 77 yards, 5:22; James Madison 35–24)
- (0:58) ODU – Colton Joseph 3-yard run, Pat Conroy pass (Drive: 9 plays, 75 yards, 1:32; James Madison 35–32)

Statistics	JMU	ODU
First downs	23	15
Total yards	425	363
Rushing yards	233	174
Passing yards	192	189
Passing: Comp–Att–Int	18–26–0	9–21–1
Time of possession	37:52	22:08

Team	Category	Player	Statistics
James Madison	Passing	Alonza Barnett III	18/26, 192 yards, TD
James Madison	Rushing	George Pettaway	19 carries, 82 yards
James Madison	Receiving	Yamir Knight	8 receptions, 121 yards, TD
Old Dominion	Passing	Colton Joseph	9/21, 189 yards, INT
Old Dominion	Rushing	Aaron Young	17 carries, 116 yards, TD
Old Dominion	Receiving	Diante Vines	4 receptions, 89 yards

=== vs Marshall ===
Marshall Thundering Herd (7–3) vs Old Dominion Monarchs (4–6) – Game summary

Quarter	1	2	3	4	Total
Thundering Herd	3	14	10	15	42
Monarchs	0	7	21	7	35

at S.B. Ballard Stadium • Norfolk, VA

- Date: November 23, 2024
- Game time: 7:30 p.m. (EST)
- Game weather: Cloudy • Temperature: 51 °F (11 °C) • Wind: NW 13 miles per hour (21 km/h)
- Game attendance: 18,083
- Referee: Marshall Lewis
- TV announcers (ESPNU): Courtney Lyle (play-by-play) and Leger Douzable (analyst)

Game information

First quarter

- (11:55) MRSH – Rece Verhoff 43 yard field goal (Drive: 4 plays, 5 yards, 0:47; Marshall 3–0)

Second quarter

- (14:52) MRSH – Christian Fitzpatrick 51 yard pass from Braylon Braxton, Rece Verhoff kick (Drive: 7 plays, 80 yards, 3:13; Marshall 10–0)
- (9:25) ODU – Aaron Young 24 yard run, Ethan Sanchez kick (Drive: 11 plays, 85 yards, 5:22; Marshall 10–7)
- (2:21) MRSH – Jordan Houston 30 yard run, Rece Verhoff kick (Drive: 6 plays, 71 yards, 1:23; Marshall 17–7)

Third quarter

- (13:03) ODU – Aaron Young 2 yard run, Ethan Sanchez kick (Drive: 5 plays, 75 yards, 1:57; Marshall 17–14)
- (10:27) MRSH – Rece Verhoff 31 yard field goal (Drive: 7 plays, 32 yards, 2:27; Marshall 20–14)
- (6:47) ODU – Na'eem Abdul-Rahim Gladding 10 yard pass from Colton Joseph, Ethan Sanchez kick (Drive: 7 plays, 84 yards, 3:35; Old Dominion 21–20)
- (4:17) MRSH – Charles Montgomery 22 yard pass from Braylon Braxton, Rece Verhoff kick (Drive: 1 play, 22 yards, 0:05; Marshall 27–21)
- (0:52) ODU – Colton Joseph 8 yard run, Ethan Sanchez kick (Drive: 8 plays, 75 yards, 3:25; Old Dominion 28–27)

Fourth quarter

- (14:52) MRSH – Carl Chester 37 yard pass from Braylon Braxton, Braylon Braxton pass (Drive: 2 plays, 50 yards, 0:51; Marshall 35–28)
- (8:23) ODU – Colton Joseph 1 yard run, Ethan Sanchez kick (Drive: 12 plays, 75 yards, 6:29; Tied 35–35)
- (4:03) MRSH – Ethan Payne 1 yard run, Rece Verhoff kick (Drive: 11 plays, 75 yards, 4:20; Marshall 42–35)

Statistics	MRSH	ODU
First downs	21	24
Total yards	469	513
Rushing yards	259	286
Passing yards	210	227
Passing: Comp–Att–Int	13–24–0	19–31–1
Time of possession	26:04	33:56

Team	Category	Player	Statistics
Marshall	Passing	Braylon Braxton	13/24, 210 yards, 3 TD
Marshall	Rushing	Braylon Braxton	18 carries, 140 yards
Marshall	Receiving	Christian Fitzpatrick	2 reception, 69 yards, TD
Old Dominion	Passing	Cotlon Joseph	19/31, 227 yards, TD, INT
Old Dominion	Rushing	Colton Joseph	25 carries, 158 yards, 2 TD
Old Dominion	Receiving	Isiah Paige	7 receptions, 103 yards

=== at Arkansas State ===
Old Dominion Monarchs (4–7) at Arkansas State Red Wolves (7–4) – Game summary

Quarter	1	2	3	4	Total
Monarchs	14	7	19	0	40
Red Wolves	7	7	15	3	32

at Centennial Bank Stadium • Jonesboro, AR

- Date: November 30, 2024
- Game time: 3:00 p.m. (EST)
- Game weather: Light rain • Temperature: 49 °F (9 °C) • Wind: SSW 14 miles per hour (23 km/h)
- Game attendance: 13,584
- Referee: Tim Barker
- TV announcers (ESPN+): Roger Twibell (play-by-play), Pete Cordelli (analyst) and Darrell Greene (sideline)

Game information

First quarter

- (11:37) ODU – Quinn Henicle 92 yard run, Ethan Sanchez kick (Drive: 1 play, 92 yards, 0:14; Old Dominion 7–0)
- (5:43) ODU – Aaron Young 1 yard run, Ethan Sanchez kick (Drive: 13 plays, 90 yards, 5:35; Old Dominion 14–0)
- (0:58) ARST – Corey Rucker 36 yard pass from Jaylen Raynor, Clune Van Andel kick (Drive: 6 plays, 49 yards, 1:28; Old Dominion 14–7)

Second quarter

- (5:58) ODU – Aaron Young 24 yard run, Ethan Sanchez kick (Drive: 8 plays, 73 yards, 3:39; Old Dominion 21–7)
- (1:54) ARST – Manny Stevenson Jr. 15 yard pass from Jaylen Raynor, Clune Van Andel kick (Drive: 9 plays, 68 yards, 4:00; Old Dominion 21–14)

Third quarter

- (11:40) ODU – Pat Conroy 15 yard pass from Quinn Henicle, Ethan Sanchez kick failed (Drive: 8 plays, 75 yards, 3:20; Old Dominion 27–14)
- (8:58) ARST – Courtney Jackson 35 yard pass from Jaylen Raynor, Clune Van Andel kick (Drive: 8 plays, 75 yards, 2:42; Old Dominion 27–21)
- (8:46) ODU – Pat Conroy 75 yard pass from Quinn Henicle, Ethan Sanchez kick failed (Drive: 1 play, 75 yards, 0:12; Old Dominion 33–21)
- (4:48) ODU – Quinn Henicle 1 yard run, Ethan Sanchez kick (Drive: 3 plays, 45 yards, 1:15; Old Dominion 40–21)
- (0:23) ARST – Zak Wallace 1 yard run, Jaylen Raynor pass to Corey Rucker for two-point conversion (Drive: 12 plays, 75 yards, 4:25; Old Dominion 40–29)

Fourth quarter

- (6:03) ARST – Clune Van Andel 26 yard field goal (Drive: 14 plays, 75 yards, 4:35; Old Dominion 40–32)

Statistics	ODU	ARST
First downs	23	26
Total yards	549	410
Rushing yards	406	149
Passing yards	143	261
Passing: Comp–Att–Int	9–12–0	22–36–1
Time of possession	30:26	29:34

Team	Category	Player	Statistics
Old Dominion	Passing	Quinn Henicle	9/12, 143 yards, 2 TD
Old Dominion	Rushing	Quinn Henicle	19 carries, 206 yards, 2 TD
Old Dominion	Receiving	Pat Conroy	4 receptions, 90 yards, 2 TD
Arkansas State	Passing	Jaylen Raynor	22/36, 261 yards, 3 TD, INT
Arkansas State	Rushing	Zak Wallace	15 carries, 89 yards, TD
Arkansas State	Receiving	Corey Rucker	8 receptions, 115 yards, TD
