= 2024 Troy Trojans football team =

American college football season

2024 Troy Trojans football
- Conference: Sun Belt Conference
- West Division
- Record: 4–8 (3–5 Sun Belt)
- Head coach: Gerad Parker (1st season)
- Offensive coordinator: Sean Reagan (1st season)
- Offensive scheme: Power spread
- Defensive coordinator: Dontae Wright (1st season)
- Co-defensive coordinator: Nathan Burton (1st season)
- Base defense: Multiple 3–3–5
- Home stadium: Veterans Memorial Stadium

2024 Sun Belt Conference football standings
	Conf.			Overall
Team	W		L	W		L
East Division
Marshall xy$	7	–	1	10	–	3
Georgia Southern	6	–	2	8	–	5
James Madison	4	–	4	9	–	4
Old Dominion	4	–	4	5	–	7
Coastal Carolina	3	–	5	6	–	7
Appalachian State	3	–	5	5	–	6
Georgia State	1	–	7	3	–	9
West Division
Louisiana xy	7	–	1	10	–	4
Texas State	5	–	3	8	–	5
Arkansas State	5	–	3	8	–	5
South Alabama	5	–	3	7	–	6
Louisiana–Monroe	3	–	5	5	–	7
Troy	3	–	5	4	–	8
Southern Miss	0	–	8	1	–	11
Championship: Marshall 31, Louisiana 3
$ – Conference champion; x – Division champion/co-champions; y – Championship game participant

The 2024 Troy Trojans football team represented Troy University as a member of the West Division of the Sun Belt Conference during the 2024 NCAA Division I FBS football season. They were led by first-year head coach Gerad Parker and the Trojans played their home games at Veterans Memorial Stadium in Troy, Alabama.

== Preseason ==
=== Media poll ===
In the Sun Belt preseason coaches' poll, the Trojans were picked to finish second place in the West division.

Offensive lineman Daniel King was awarded to be in the preseason All-Sun Belt first team offense, respectively. Offensive lineman Eli Russ and punter Robert Cole were named to the second team offense and special teams.

== Schedule ==
The football schedule was announced on March 1, 2024.

Date	Time	Opponent	Site	TV	Result	Attendance
August 31	6:00 p.m.	Nevada*	Veterans Memorial Stadium; Troy, AL	ESPN+	L 26–28	27,412
September 7	11:00 a.m.	at Memphis*	Simmons Bank Liberty Stadium; Memphis, TN	ESPNU	L 17–38	23,246
September 14	3:00 p.m.	at Iowa*	Kinnick Stadium; Iowa City, IA	FS1	L 21–38	69,250
September 21	6:00 p.m.	Florida A&M*	Veterans Memorial Stadium; Troy, AL	ESPN+	W 34–12	29,024
September 28	6:00 p.m.	Louisiana–Monroe	Veterans Memorial Stadium; Troy, AL	ESPN+	L 9–13	21,253
October 3	6:00 p.m.	Texas State	Veterans Memorial Stadium; Troy, AL	ESPN2	L 17–38	20,349
October 15	6:30 p.m.	at South Alabama	Hancock Whitney Stadium; Mobile, AL (rivalry)	ESPN2	L 9–25	25,450
October 26	6:00 p.m.	at Arkansas State	Centennial Bank Stadium; Jonesboro, AR	ESPN+	L 31–34	17,162
November 2	3:00 p.m.	Coastal Carolina^{†}	Veterans Memorial Stadium; Troy, AL	ESPN+	W 38–24	24,223
November 16	3:00 p.m.	at Georgia Southern	Paulson Stadium; Statesboro, GA	ESPN+	W 28–20	21,762
November 23	4:00 p.m.	at Louisiana	Cajun Field; Lafayette, LA	ESPN+	L 30–51	15,501
November 30	1:00 p.m.	Southern Miss	Veterans Memorial Stadium; Troy, AL	ESPN+	W 52–20	19,521
*Non-conference game; ^{†}Homecoming; All times are in Central time

== Game summaries ==
=== vs. Nevada ===
Game One – Nevada Wolf Pack (0–1) at Troy Trojans (0–0) – Game summary

Quarter	1	2	3	4	Total
Wolf Pack	0	6	15	7	28
Trojans	7	7	3	9	26

at Veterans Memorial Stadium • Troy, AL

- Date: Saturday, August 31, 2024
- Game time: 6:00 PM CST
- Game weather: Cloudy • Temperature: 89 °F (32 °C) • Wind: N at 4 miles per hour (6.4 km/h)
- Game attendance: 27,412
- Referee: Nolan Dumas
- TV announcers (ESPN+): Will Kollmeyer (play-by-play), Ben Stanfield (analyst), and Junior Louissaint (sideline)

Game information

First quarter

- (3:59) TRO – Damien Taylor 25-yard run, Scott Taylor Renfroe kick (Drive: 11 plays, 84 yards, 4:53; Troy 7–0)

Second quarter

- (3:08) TRO – Gerald Green 16-yard run, Scott Taylor Renfroe kick (Drive: 5 plays, 70 yards, 2:33; Troy 14–0)
- (0:25) NEV – Jace Henry 17-yard pass from Brendon Lewis (Drive: 8 plays, 57 yards, 2:36; Troy 14–6)

Third quarter

- (13:55) NEV – Patrick Garwo III 1-yard run, Jaden Smith pass (Drive: 3 plays, 75 yards, 1:05; Tied 14–14)
- (7:24) TRO – Scott Taylor Renfroe 30-yard field goal (Drive: 13 plays, 69 yards, 6:24; Troy 17–14)
- (3:20) NEV – Patrick Garwo III 22-yard run, Matthew Killam kick (Drive: 7 plays, 79 yards, 3:57; Nevada 21–17)

Fourth quarter

- (12:56) NEV – Marcus Bellon 7-yard pass from Brendon Lewis, Matthew Killam kick (Drive: 6 plays, 36 yards, 3:22; Nevada 28–17)
- (6:12) TRO – Scott Taylor Renfroe 19-yard field goal (Drive: 13 plays, 74 yards, 6:44; Nevada 28–20)
- (0:21) TRO – Devonte Ross 16-yard pass from Goose Crowder (Drive: 9 plays, 75 yards, 1:56; Nevada 28–26)

Statistics	NEV	TROY
First downs	17	24
Total yards	393	391
Rushing yards	214	190
Passing yards	179	201
Passing: Comp–Att–Int	18–21–0	20–30–0
Time of possession	29:35	30:25

Team	Category	Player	Statistics
Nevada	Passing	Brendon Lewis	17/20, 158 yards, 2 TD
Nevada	Rushing	Savion Red	11 carries, 135 yards
Nevada	Receiving	Jaden Smith	6 receptions, 81 yards
Troy	Passing	Goose Crowder	20/30, 201 yards, TD
Troy	Rushing	Damien Taylor	11 carries, 103 yards, TD
Troy	Receiving	Devonte Ross	7 receptions, 103 yards, TD

=== at Memphis ===
Game Two – Troy Trojans (0–1) at Memphis Tigers (1–0) – Game summary

Quarter	1	2	3	4	Total
Trojans	0	7	3	7	17
Tigers	7	14	10	7	38

at Simmons Bank Liberty Stadium • Memphis, TN

- Date: Saturday September 7, 2024
- Game time: 11:00 a.m.
- Game weather: Sunny • Temperature: 72 °F (22 °C) • Wind: NE at 15 miles per hour (24 km/h)
- Game attendance: 23,246
- Referee: Ted Pitts
- TV announcers (ESPNU): Mike Corey (play-by-play) and Rene Ingoglia (analyst)

Game information

First quarter

- (8:35) MEM – Brandon Thomas 2-yard run, Caden Costa kick (Drive: 14 plays, 70 yards, 5:32; Memphis 7–0)

Second quarter

- (12:51) TRO – Goose Crowder 11-yard run, Scott Taylor Renfroe kick (Drive: 13 plays, 75 yards, 7:00; Tied 7–7)
- (7:35) MEM – Brandon Thomas 1-yard run, Caden Costa kick (Drive: 12 plays, 75 yards, 5:16; Memphis 14–7)
- (3:07) MEM – Mario Anderson Jr. 21-yard run, Caden Costa kick (Drive: 2 plays, 50 yards, 0:51; Memphis 21–7)

Third quarter

- (10:16) MEM – Caden Costa 32-yard field goal (Drive: 6 plays, 17 yards, 3:14; Memphis 24–7)
- (5:32) MEM – Brendan Doyle 4-yard pass from Seth Henigan, Caden Costa kick (Drive: 6 plays, 69 yards, 2:43; Memphis 31–7)
- (0:29) TRO – Scott Taylor Renfroe 22-yard field goal (Drive: 10 plays, 71 yards, 5:03; Memphis 31–10)

Fourth quarter

- (13:03) MEM – Mario Anderson Jr. 4-yard run, Caden Costa kick (Drive: 7 plays, 75 yards, 2:06; Memphis 38–10)
- (6:47) TRO – Matthew Caldwell 1-yard run, Scott Taylor Renfroe kick (Drive: 14 plays, 75 yards, 6:16; Memphis 38–17)

Statistics	TROY	MEM
First downs	17	27
Total yards	251	372
Rushing yards	101	211
Passing yards	150	161
Passing: Comp–Att–Int	16–26–0	20–32–0
Time of possession	31:06	28:54

Team	Category	Player	Statistics
Troy	Passing	Matthew Caldwell	11/19, 113 yards
Troy	Rushing	Damien Taylor	7 carries, 33 yards
Troy	Receiving	Zeriah Beason	4 receptions, 60 yards
Memphis	Passing	Seth Henigan	20/32, 161 yards, TD
Memphis	Rushing	Mario Anderson Jr.	17 carries, 125 yards, 2 TD
Memphis	Receiving	DeMeer Blankumsee	4 receptions, 50 yards

=== at Iowa ===
Game Three – Troy Trojans (0–2) at Iowa Hawkeyes (1–1) – Game summary

Quarter	1	2	3	4	Total
Trojans	0	14	7	0	21
Hawkeyes	0	10	14	14	38

at Kinnick Stadium • Iowa City, IA

- Date: Saturday September 14, 2024
- Game time: 3:00 p.m.
- Game weather: 82 °F (28 °C), Cloudy, Wind SE 6 mph (9.7 km/h)
- Game attendance: 69,250
- Referee: Chris Coyle
- TV announcers (FS1): Eric Collins (play-by-play) and Spencer Tillman (analyst)

Game information

First quarter

No scoring

Second quarter

- 11:12 Iowa – Kaleb Johnson 4-yard run (Drew Stevens kick) (Drive: 7 plays, 56 yards, 2:51; Iowa 7–0)
- 9:08 Troy – Devonte Ross 63-yard pass from Matthew Caldwell (Scott Taylor Renfroe kick) (Drive: 4 plays, 75 yards, 2:04; Tied 7–7)
- 6:24 Iowa – Drew Stevens 42-yard field goal (Drive: 6 plays, 51 yards, 2:44; Iowa 10–7)
- 1:00 Troy – Devonte Ross 77-yard punt return (Scott Taylor Renfroe kick) (Troy 14–10)

Third quarter

- 6:44 Iowa – Addison Ostrenga 2-yard pass from Brendan Sullivan (Drew Stevens kick) (Drive: 8 plays, 70 yards, 4:30; Iowa 17–14)
- 2:30 Iowa – Jermari Harris 28-yard interception return (Drew Stevens kick) (Iowa 24–14)
- 0:58 Troy – Devonte Ross 62-yard pass from Tucker Kilcrease (Scott Taylor Renfroe kick) (Drive: 3 plays, 75 yards, 1:32; Tied 24–21)

Fourth quarter

- 12:05 Iowa – Kaleb Johnson 33-yard run (Drew Stevens kick) (Drive: 8 plays, 75 yards, 3:53; Iowa 31–21)
- 6:01 Iowa – Jaziun Patterson 39-yard run (Drew Stevens kick) (Drive: 6 plays, 71 yards, 3:15; Iowa 38–21)

Statistics	TROY	IOWA
First downs	10	25
Total yards	253	462
Rushing yards	24	284
Passing yards	229	178
Passing: Comp–Att–Int	16–26–1	20–24–0
Time of possession	23:41	36:19

Team	Category	Player	Statistics
Troy	Passing	Matthew Caldwell	14/21, 156 yards, TD, INT
Troy	Rushing	Damien Taylor	7 carries, 20 yards
Troy	Receiving	Devonte Ross	5 receptions, 142 yards, 2 TD
Iowa	Passing	Cade McNamara	19/23, 176 yards
Iowa	Rushing	Kaleb Johnson	25 carries, 173 yards, 2 TD
Iowa	Receiving	Jacob Gill	5 receptions, 44 yards

=== vs. Florida A&M (FCS) ===
Game Four – Florida A&M Rattlers (FCS) (2–1) vs Troy Trojans (0–3) – Game summary

Quarter	1	2	3	4	Total
Rattlers (FCS)	6	3	3	0	12
Trojans	7	7	7	13	34

at Veterans Memorial Stadium • Troy, AL

- Date: September 21, 2024
- Game time: 6:00 p.m.
- Game weather: Sunny • Temperature: 85 °F (29 °C) • Wind: W 3 mph
- Game attendance: 29,024
- Referee: Tim Barker
- TV announcers (ESPN+): Will Kollmeyer (play-by-play), Ben Stanfield (analyst) and Junior Louissaint (sideline)

Game information

First quarter

- (12:22) TRO – Damien Taylor 40-yard run, Scott Taylor Renfroe kick (Drive: 6 plays, 75 yards, 2:38; Troy 7–0)
- (7:34) FAM – Cameron Gillis 29-yard field goal (Drive: 10 plays, 53 yards, 4:48; Troy 7–3)
- (1:11) FAM – Cameron Gillis 22-yard field goal (Drive: 8 plays, 63 yards, 4:03; Troy 7–6)

Second quarter

- (0:46) TRO – Devonte Ross 20-yard pass from Goose Crowder, Scott Taylor Renfroe kick (Drive: 2 plays, 40 yards, 0:20; Troy 14–6)
- (0:05) FAM – Cameron Gillis 31-yard field goal (Drive: 5 plays, 61 yards, 0:41; Troy 14–9)

Third quarter

- (10:57) TRO – Devonte Ross 44-yard from Goose Crowder, Scott Taylor Renfroe kick (Drive: 4 plays, 73 yards, 1:58; Troy 21–9)
- (5:29) FAM – Cameron Gillis 43-yard field goal (Drive: 10 plays, 57 yards, 5:23; Troy 21–12)

Fourth quarter

- (14:16) TRO – Damien Taylor 7-yard pass from Goose Crowder (Drive: 12 plays, 75 yards, 6:12; Troy 27–12)
- (8:36) TRO – Devonte Ross 98-yard pass from Goose Crowder, Scott Taylor Renfroe kick (Drive: 3 plays, 98 yards, 0:51; Troy 34–12)

Statistics	FA&M	TROY
First downs	19	24
Total yards	343	507
Rushing yards	55	212
Passing yards	288	295
Passing: Comp–Att–Int	25–39–0	18–25–0
Time of possession	33:05	26:55

Team	Category	Player	Statistics
Florida A&M	Passing	Daniel Richardson	25/39, 288 yards
Florida A&M	Rushing	Thad Franklin Jr.	10 carries, 46 yards
Florida A&M	Receiving	Jamari Gassett	10 receptions, 141 yards
Troy	Passing	Goose Crowder	17/24, 291 yards, 4 TD
Troy	Rushing	Damien Taylor	15 carries, 109 yards, TD
Troy	Receiving	Devonte Ross	11 receptions, 229 yards, 3 TD

=== vs. Louisiana–Monroe ===
Game Five – Louisiana–Monroe Warhawks (2–1) at Troy Trojans (1–3)

Quarter	1	2	3	4	Total
Warhawks	3	0	3	7	13
Trojans	3	3	0	3	9

at Veterans Memorial Stadium, Troy, AL

- Date: Saturday September 28, 2024
- Game time: 6:00 p.m. CDT
- Game weather: Sunny • Temperature: 78 °F (26 °C) • Wind: NE 4 mph
- Game attendance: 21,253
- Referee: Trennis Livingston
- TV announcers (ESPN+): Will Kollmeyer (play-by-play), Ben Stanfield (analyst) and Junior Louissaint (sideline)

Game information

First Quarter

- (9:02) TRO – Scott Taylor Renfroe 37-yard field goal (Drive: 13 plays, 56 yards, 5:58; Troy 3–0)
- (3:09) ULM – Max Larson 42-yard field goal (Drive: 11 plays, 51 yards, 5:53; Tied 3–3)

Second Quarter

- (0:57) TRO – Scott Taylor Renfroe 49-yard field goal (Drive: 10 plays, 47 yards, 3:47; Troy 6–3)

Third Quarter

- (4:07) ULM – Max Larson 20-yard field goal (Drive: 9 plays, 71 yards, 6:05; Tied 6–6)

Fourth Quarter

- (14:36) TRO – Scott Taylor Renfroe 36-yard field goal (Drive: 10 plays, 59 yards, 4:26; Troy 9–6)
- (9:08) ULM – Ahmad Hardy 1-yard run, Max Larson kick (Drive: 8 plays, 75 yards, 5:28; Louisiana–Monroe 13–9)

Statistics	ULM	TROY
First downs	13	17
Total yards	247	260
Rushing yards	112	189
Passing yards	135	71
Passing: Comp–Att–Int	6–11–1	7–12–0
Time of possession	29:29	30:31

Team	Category	Player	Statistics
Louisiana–Monroe	Passing	Aidan Armenta	4/6, 108 yards
Louisiana–Monroe	Rushing	Ahmad Hardy	27 carries, 106 yards, TD
Louisiana–Monroe	Receiving	Jake Godfrey	1 reception, 57 yards
Troy	Passing	Tucker Kilcrease	6/11, 57 yards
Troy	Rushing	Gerald Green	13 carries, 102 yards
Troy	Receiving	Zeriah Beason	2 receptions, 30 yards

=== vs. Texas State ===
Game Six – Texas State Bobcats (2–2) at Troy Trojans (1–4)

Quarter	1	2	3	4	Total
Bobcats	14	14	10	0	38
Trojans	0	10	7	0	17

at Veterans Memorial Stadium, Troy, AL

- Date: Thursday October 3, 2024
- Game time: 6:00 p.m. CDT
- Game weather: Sunny • Temperature: 80 °F (27 °C) • Wind: W 6 mph
- Game attendance: 20,349
- Referee: Scott Broadway
- TV announcers (ESPNU): Dave Neal (play-by-play), Aaron Murray (analyst), and Ashley ShahAhmadi (sideline)

Game information

First Quarter

- (9:35) TST – Ismail Mahdi 1-yard run, Mason Shipley kick (Drive: 7 plays, 66 yards, 2:51; Texas State 7–0)
- (2:05) TST – Jaden Williams 10-yard pass from Jordan McCloud, Mason Shipley kick (Drive: 8 plays, 64 yards, 3:35; Texas State 14–0)

Second Quarter

- (10:52) TRO – Mojo Dortch 7-yard pass from Tucker Kilcrease, Scott Taylor Renfroe kick (Drive: 5 plays, 66 yards, 2:26; Texas State 14–7)
- (9:03) TST – Kole Wilson 51-yard pass from Jordan McCloud, Mason Shipley kick (Drive: 4 plays, 75 yards, 1:49; Texas State 21–7)
- (3:17) TRO – Scott Taylor Renfroe 42-yard field goal (Drive: 12 plays, 52 yards, 5:46; Texas State 21–10)
- (2:02) TST – Joey Hobert 28-yard pass from Jordan McCloud, Mason Shipley kick (Drive: 5 plays, 75 yards, 1:15; Texas State 28–10)

Third Quarter

- (9:47) TST – Mason Shipley 53-yard field goal (Drive: 12 plays, 40 yards, 5:13; Texas State 31–10)
- (5:34) TST – Jordan McCloud 42-yard run, Mason Shipley kick (Drive: 3 plays, 48 yards, 1:24; Texas State 38–10)
- (3:28) TRO – Devonte Ross 19-yard pass from Tucker Kilcrease, Scott Taylor Renfroe kick (Drive: 5 plays, 75 yards, 2:06; Texas State 38–17)

Fourth Quarter

No scoring plays

Statistics	TXST	TROY
First downs	26	19
Total yards	467	331
Rushing yards	215	63
Passing yards	252	268
Passing: Comp–Att–Int	20–29–2	19–32–0
Time of possession	31:27	28:33

Team	Category	Player	Statistics
Texas State	Passing	Jordan McCloud	20/29, 252 yards, 3 TD, 2 INT
Texas State	Rushing	Torrance Burgess Jr.	12 carries, 85 yards
Texas State	Receiving	Kole Wilson	4 receptions, 77 yards, TD
Troy	Passing	Tucker Kilcrease	17/28, 249 yards, 2 TD
Troy	Rushing	Damien Taylor	11 carries, 63 yards
Troy	Receiving	Landon Parker	5 receptions, 83 yards

=== at South Alabama (rivalry) ===
Game Seven – Troy Trojans (1–5) at South Alabama Jaguars (2–4)

Quarter	1	2	3	4	Total
Trojans	0	3	0	6	9
Jaguars	3	16	6	0	25

at Hancock Whitney Stadium, Mobile, AL

- Date: Tuesday October 15, 2024
- Game time: 6:30 p.m. CDT
- Game weather: Cloudy • Temperature: 76 °F (24 °C) • Wind: SE 4 mph
- Game attendance: 25,450
- Referee: Trennis Livingston
- TV announcers (ESPN2): Clay Matvick (play-by-play) and Steve Addazio (analyst)

Game information

First Quarter

- (1:18) USA – Laith Marjan 36-yard field goal (Drive: 11 plays, 34 yards, 5:08; South Alabama 3–0)

Second Quarter

- (9:10) USA – Jeremiah Webb 24-yard pass from Gio Lopez, Laith Marjan kick (Drive: 2 plays, 22 yards, 0:42; South Alabama 10–0)
- (7:40) USA – 0-yard safety (South Alabama 12–0)
- (4:34) USA – Gio Lopez 49-yard run, Laith Marjan kick (Drive: 5 plays, 69 yards, 3:00; South Alabama 19–0)
- (0:18) TROY – Scott Taylor Renfroe 36-yard field goal (Drive: 15 plays, 57 yards, 4:16; South Alabama 19–3)

Third Quarter

- (8:34) USA – Laith Marjan 42-yard field goal (Drive: 6 plays, 48 yards, 3:35; South Alabama 22–3)
- (0:50) USA – Laith Marjan 42-yard field goal (Drive: 4 plays, -2 yards, 1:51; South Alabama 25–3)

Fourth Quarter

- (2:35) TROY – Devonte Ross 11-yard pass from Matthew Caldwell (Drive: 4 plays, 64 yards, 1:31; South Alabama 25–9)

Statistics	TROY	USA
First downs	14	12
Total yards	172	318
Rushing yards	36	160
Passing yards	136	158
Passing: Comp–Att–Int	19–36–3	16–21–0
Time of possession	24:03	35:57

Team	Category	Player	Statistics
Troy	Passing	Matthew Caldwell	17/30, 142 yards, TD, 2 INT
Troy	Rushing	Damien Taylor	6 carries, 23 yards
Troy	Receiving	Devonte Ross	7 receptions, 70 yards, TD
South Alabama	Passing	Gio Lopez	16/21, 158 yards, TD
South Alabama	Rushing	Gio Lopez	11 carries, 67 yards, TD
South Alabama	Receiving	Javon Ivory	1 reception, 57 yards

=== at Arkansas State ===
Game Eight – Troy Trojans (1–6) at Arkansas State Red Wolves (4–3)

Quarter	1	2	3	4	Total
Trojans	0	3	21	7	31
Red Wolves	13	10	3	8	34

at Centennial Bank Stadium, Jonesboro, AR

- Date: Saturday October 26, 2024
- Game time: 6:00 p.m. CDT
- Game weather: Sunny • Temperature: 70 °F (21 °C) • Wind: NE 8 miles per hour (13 km/h)
- Game attendance: 17,162
- Referee: Scott Broadway
- TV announcers (ESPN+): Darrell Greene (play-by-play) and Pete Cordelli (analyst)

Game information

First Quarter

- (11:19) ASU – Clune Van Andel 22-yard field goal (Drive: 9 plays, 71 yards, 3:41; Arkansas State 3–0)
- (7:58) ASU – Clune Van Andel 19-yard field goal (Drive: 7 plays, 26 yards, 3:16; Arkansas State 6–0)
- (1:40) ASU – Zak Wallace 5-yard run, Clune Van Andel kick (Drive: 10 plays, 99 yards, 3:54; Arkansas State 13–0)

Second Quarter

- (8:20) TRO – Scott Taylor Renfroe 38-yard field goal (Drive: 14 plays, 55 yards, 8:20; Arkansas State 13–3)
- (4:39) ASU – Zak Wallace 3-yard run, Clune Van Andel kick (Drive: 9 plays, 71 yards, 3:37; Arkansas State 20–3)
- (0:02) ASU – Clune Van Andel 39-yard field goal (Drive: 8 plays, 35 yards, 1:15; Arkansas State 23–3)

Third Quarter

- (9:44) TRO – Damien Taylor 1-yard run, Scott Taylor Renfroe kick (Drive: 11 plays, 75 yards, 5:16; Arkansas State 23–10)
- (6:00) TRO – Brody Dalton 16-yard pass from Matthew Caldwell, Scott Taylor Renfroe kick (Drive: 6 plays, 53 yards, 2:36; Arkansas State 23–17)
- (3:34) TRO – Peyton Higgins 1-yard pass from Matthew Caldwell, Scott Taylor Renfroe kick (Drive: 3 plays, 27 yards, 1:08; Troy 24–23)
- (0:49) ASU – Clune Van Andel 46-yard field goal (Drive: 9 plays, 46 yards, 2:45; Arkansas State 26–24)

Fourth Quarter

- (1:45) TRO – Gerald Green 2-yard run, Scott Taylor Renfroe kick (Drive: 10 plays, 80 yards, 3:32; Troy 31–26)
- (0:33) ASU – Zak Wallace 1-yard run, Corey Rucker pass (Drive: 9 plays, 75 yards, 1:12; Arkansas State 34–31)

Statistics	TROY	ARST
First downs	23	26
Total yards	466	534
Rushing yards	162	185
Passing yards	304	349
Passing: Comp–Att–Int	22–33–3	25–40–0
Time of possession	30:47	29:13

Team	Category	Player	Statistics
Troy	Passing	Matthew Caldwell	22/33, 304 yards, 2 TD, 3 INT
Troy	Rushing	Gerald Green	20 carries, 113 yards, TD
Troy	Receiving	Devonte Ross	11 receptions, 126 yards
Arkansas State	Passing	Jaylen Raynor	25/40, 349 yards
Arkansas State	Rushing	Jaylen Raynor	12 carries, 71 yards
Arkansas State	Receiving	Corey Rucker	12 receptions, 193 yards

=== vs. Coastal Carolina ===
Game Nine – Coastal Carolina Chanticleers (4–3) at Troy Trojans (1–7)

Quarter	1	2	3	4	Total
Chanticleers	7	0	17	0	24
Trojans	7	21	7	3	38

at Veterans Memorial Stadium, Troy, AL

- Date: Saturday November 2, 2024
- Game time: 4:00 p.m. CDT
- Game weather: Sunny • Temperature: 81 °F (27 °C) • Wind: NW 7 mph
- Game attendance: 24,223
- Referee: Jeremy Parker
- TV announcers (ESPN+): Will Kollmeyer (play-by-play), Ben Stanfield (analyst) and Junior Louissaint (sideline)

Game information

First Quarter

- (5:02) TROY – Gerald Green 1-yard run, Scott Taylor Renfroe kick (Drive: 7 plays, 99 yards, 3:45; Troy 7–0)
- (1:12) CCU – Ethan Vasko 11-yard run, Kade Hensley kick (Drive: 1 play, 11 yards, 0:11; Tied 7–7)

Second Quarter

- (10:42) TROY – Devonte Ross 3-yard pass from Matthew Caldwell, Scott Taylor Renfroe kick (Drive: 11 plays, 82 yards, 5:24; Troy 14–7)
- (4:57) TROY – Gerald Green 83-yard pass from Matthew Caldwell, Scott Taylor Renfroe kick (Drive: 3 plays, 89 yards, 1:20; Troy 21–7)
- (0:27) TROY – Matthew Caldwell 1-yard run, Scott Taylor Renfroe kick (Drive: 9 plays, 64 yards, 3:42; Troy 28–7)

Third Quarter

- (9:43) CCU – Kade Hensley 28-yard field goal (Drive: 12 plays, 73 yards, 5:12; Troy 28–10)
- (9:22) CCU – Braydon Bennett 21-yard run, Kade Hensley kick (Drive: 2 plays, 21 yards, 0:13; Troy 28–17)
- (6:22) TROY – Damien Taylor 41-yard run, Scott Taylor Renfroe kick (Drive: 7 plays, 70 yards, 3:00; Troy 35–17)
- (2:20) CCU – Jameson Tucker 38-yard pass from Ethan Vasko, Kade Hensley kick (Drive: 11 plays, 75 yards, 4:02; Troy 35–24)

Fourth Quarter

- (2:42) TROY – Scott Taylor Renfroe 36-yard field goal (Drive: 14 plays, 50 yards, 6:39; Troy 38–24)

Statistics	CCU	TROY
First downs	16	23
Total yards	313	511
Rushing yards	107	342
Passing yards	206	169
Passing: Comp–Att–Int	18–34–0	9–16–0
Time of possession	26:10	33:50

Team	Category	Player	Statistics
Coastal Carolina	Passing	Ethan Vasko	18/34, 206 yards, TD
Coastal Carolina	Rushing	Braydon Bennett	10 carries, 69 yards, TD
Coastal Carolina	Receiving	Jameson Tucker	6 receptions, 106 yards, TD
Troy	Passing	Matthew Caldwell	9/16, 169 yards, 2 TD
Troy	Rushing	Damien Taylor	28 carries, 190 yards, TD
Troy	Receiving	Gerald Green	1 reception, 83 yards, TD

=== at Georgia Southern ===
Game Ten – Troy Trojans (2–7) at Georgia Southern Eagles (6–3) – Game summary

Quarter	1	2	3	4	Total
Trojans	0	7	7	14	28
Eagles	7	3	7	3	20

at Paulson Stadium, Statesboro, GA

- Date: Saturday November 16, 2024
- Game time: 3:00 p.m. CDT
- Game weather: Sunny • Temperature: 69 °F (21 °C)
- Game attendance: 21,762
- Referee: Marshall Lewis
- TV announcers (ESPN+): Danny Waugh (play-by-play), Jayson Foster (analyst) and Whitney Haworth (sideline)

Game information

First Quarter

- (1:56) GASO – Josh Dallas 4-yard run, Gavin Stewart kick (Drive: 12 plays, 80 yards, 5:44; Georgia Southern 7–0)

Second Quarter

- (14:23) TROY – Brody Dalton 6-yard pass from Matthew Caldwell, Scott Taylor Renfroe kick (Drive: 5 plays, 75 yards, 2:33; Tied 7–7)
- (0:27) GASO – Gavin Stewart 21-yard field goal (Drive: 10 plays, 82 yards, 2:28; Georgia Southern 10–7)

Third Quarter

- (7:50) TROY – Devonte Ross 4-yard pass from Matthew Caldwell, Scott Taylor Renfroe kick (Drive: 11 plays, 71 yards, 5:48; Troy 14–10)
- (2:34) GASO – OJ Arnold 1-yard run, Gavin Stewart kick (Drive: 10 plays, 75 yards, 5:16; Georgia Southern 17–14)

Fourth Quarter

- (13:34) TROY – Matthew Caldwell 2-yard run, Scott Taylor Renfroe kick (Drive: 7 plays, 75 yards, 4:00; Troy 21–17)
- (10:43) GASO – Gavin Stewart 45-yard field goal (Drive: 6 plays, 48 yards, 2:51; Troy 21–20)
- (2:32) TROY – Matthew Caldwell 1-yard run, Scott Taylor Renfroe kick (Drive: 16 plays, 75 yards, 8:11; Troy 28–20)

Statistics	TROY	GASO
First downs	27	19
Total yards	441	246
Rushing yards	153	75
Passing yards	288	171
Passing: Comp–Att–Int	26–32–0	17–28–1
Time of possession	38:31	21:29

Team	Category	Player	Statistics
Troy	Passing	Matthew Caldwell	26/32, 288 yards, 2 TD
Troy	Rushing	Damien Taylor	18 carries, 92 yards
Troy	Receiving	Devonte Ross	10 receptions, 95 yards, TD
Georgia Southern	Passing	JC French	17/28, 171 yards, INT
Georgia Southern	Rushing	OJ Arnold	6 carries, 27 yards, TD
Georgia Southern	Receiving	Josh Dallas	4 receptions, 69 yards

=== at Louisiana ===
Game Eleven – Troy Trojans (3–7) at Louisiana Ragin' Cajuns (8–2)

Quarter	1	2	3	4	Total
Trojans	14	0	8	8	30
Ragin' Cajuns	7	27	3	14	51

at Cajun Field, Lafayette, LA

- Date: Saturday November 23, 2024
- Game time: 4:00 p.m. CDT
- Game weather: Sunny • Temperature: 68 °F (20 °C) • Wind: NE 1 mph
- Game attendance: 15,501
- Referee: Jeremy Parker
- TV announcers (ESPN+): Dan McDonald (play-by-play), Eric Mouton (analyst) and Ben Schafer (sideline)

Game information

First Quarter

- (9:44) LA – Tavion Smith 20-yard pass from Chandler Fields, Kenneth Almendares kick (Drive: 6 plays, 85 yards, 3:03; Louisiana 7–0)
- (4:24) TROY – Jackson Worley 4-yard pass from Matthew Caldwell, Scott Taylor Renfroe kick (Drive: 7 plays, 34 yards, 3:45; Tied 7–7)
- (0:00) TROY – Devonte Ross 30-yard pass from Matthew Caldwell, Scott Taylor Renfroe kick (Drive: 7 plays, 68 yards, 2:58; Troy 14–7)

Second Quarter

- (13:31) LA – Bill Davis 1-yard run, Kenneth Almendares kick (Drive: 4 plays, 55 yards, 1:20; Tied 14–14)
- (12:23) LA – Lance LeGendre 44-yard pass from Chandler Fields, Kenneth Almendares kick (Drive: 1 play, 44 yards, 0:08; Louisiana 21–14)
- (8:08) LA – Kenneth Almendares 38-yard field goal (Drive: 6 plays, 37 yards, 2:44; Louisiana 24–14)
- (2:16) LA – Bill Davis 3-yard run, Kenneth Almendares kick (Drive: 5 plays, 49 yards, 2:49; Louisiana 31–14)
- (0:00) LA – Kenneth Almendares 32-yard field goal (Drive: 6 plays, 26 yards, 0:48; Louisiana 34–14)

Third Quarter

- (11:06) LA – Kenneth Almendares 46-yard field goal (Drive: 7 plays, 46 yards, 3:54; Louisiana 37–14)
- (5:45) TROY – Brody Dalton 6-yard pass from Matthew Caldwell, Landon Parker pass (Drive: 10 plays, 83 yards, 5:14; Louisiana 37–22)

Fourth Quarter

- (11:31) TROY – Trae Swartz 1-yard pass from Matthew Caldwell, Devonte Ross pass (Drive: 13 plays, 82 yards, 6:48; Louisiana 37–30)
- (11:16) LA – Robert Williams 96-yard kickoff return, Kenneth Almendares kick (Louisiana 44–30)
- (1:09) LA – Bill Davis 1-yard run, Kenneth Almendares kick (Drive: 3 plays, 3 yards, 1:31; Louisiana 51–30)

Statistics	TROY	LA
First downs	22	17
Total yards	394	417
Rushing yards	135	94
Passing yards	259	323
Passing: Comp–Att–Int	27–44–0	18–24–2
Time of possession	33:37	26:23

Team	Category	Player	Statistics
Troy	Passing	Matthew Caldwell	26/42, 230 yards, 4 TD, 2 INT
Troy	Rushing	Damien Taylor	16 carries, 67 yards
Troy	Receiving	Devonte Ross	8 receptions, 95 yards, TD
Louisiana	Passing	Chandler Fields	18/24, 323 yards, 2 TD
Louisiana	Rushing	Bill Davis	19 carries, 64 yards, 3 TD
Louisiana	Receiving	Lance LeGendre	6 receptions, 109 yards, TD

=== Southern Miss ===
Game Twelve – Southern Miss Golden Eagles (1–10) at Troy Trojans (3–8)

Quarter	1	2	3	4	Total
Golden Eagles	8	0	6	6	20
Trojans	10	7	14	21	52

at Veterans Memorial Stadium, Troy, AL

- Date: November 30
- Game time: 1:00 p.m. CDT
- Game weather: Sunny • Temperature: 53 °F (12 °C) • Wind: NE 6 mph
- Game attendance: 19,521
- Referee: Steven Robinson
- TV announcers (ESPN+): Will Kollmeyer (play-by-play), Ben Stanfield (analyst) and Junior Louissaint (sideline)

Game information

First Quarter

- (12:11) USM – Kenyon Clay 1-yard rush, Bryce Lofton two-point conversion pass to Kyirin Heath (Drive: 3 plays, 41 yards, 1:29; Southern Miss 8–0)
- (7:28) TROY – Damien Taylor 6-yard rush, Scott Taylor Renfroe kick (Drive: 10 plays, 57 yards, 4:43; Southern Miss 8–7)
- (2:59) TROY – Scott Taylor Renfroe 50-yard field goal (Drive: 9 plays, 39 yards, 3:39; Troy 10–8)

Second Quarter

- (8:50) TROY – Matthew Caldwell 14-yard rush, Scott Taylor Renfroe kick (Drive: 13 plays, 67 yards, 6:26; Troy 17–8)

Third Quarter

- (6:04) TROY – Damien Taylor 56-yard rush, Scott Taylor Renfroe kick (Drive: 1 play, 56 yards, 0:12; Troy 24–8)
- (5:46) USM – Larry Simmons 75 yard pass from Tate Rodemaker, Two-point pass conversion attempt failed (Drive: 3 plays, 29 yards, 1:09; Troy 24–14)
- (0:42) TROY – Trae Swartz 10-yard pass from Matthew Caldwell, Scott Taylor Renfroe kick (Drive: 10 plays, 75 yards, 5:04; Troy 31–14)

Fourth Quarter

- (7:05) USM – Tiaquelin Mims 4-yard pass from Tate Rodemaker, Connor Gibbs PAT failed (Drive: 3 plays, 29 yards, 1:09; Troy 31–20)
- (5:59) TROY – Damien Taylor 35-yard rush, Scott Taylor Renfroe kick (Drive: 3 plays, 49 yards, 1:05; Troy 38–20)
- (5:43) TROY – Ian Conerly-Goodly 31-yard interception returned, Scott Taylor Renfroe kick (Drive: 0 plays, 0 yards, 0:00; Troy 45–20)
- (4:08) TROY – Jordan Lovett 5-yard rush, Nick Troemel kick (Drive: 2 plays, 16 yards, 0:25; Troy 52–20)

Statistics	USM	TROY
First downs	15	24
Plays–yards	290	453
Rushes–yards	30-31	44-266
Passing yards	259	187
Passing: Comp–Att–Int	19-31-2	14-27-0
Time of possession	28:18	31:42

Team	Category	Player	Statistics
Southern Miss	Passing	Tate Rodemaker	18/30, 234 yards, 2 TDs, 2 INTs
Southern Miss	Rushing	JQ Gray	5 carries, 27 yards
Southern Miss	Receiving	Larry Simmons	4 receptions, 90 yards, 1 TD
Troy	Passing	Matthew Caldwell	14/26, 187 yards, 1 TD
Troy	Rushing	Damien Taylor	23 carries, 169 yards, 3 TDs
Troy	Receiving	Devonte Ross	5 receptions, 70 yards

== Personnel ==
=== Transfers ===
Outgoing
Player	Position	New school
Zach Long	K	Bowling Green
Kobe Williams	IOL	Grambling State
Jeremiah Frazier	IOL	Alabama State
Blake Matthews	LB	Delaware
Fabian Rogosch	EDGE	Unknown
Darrell Starling	S	Unknown
Jayden McDonald	LB	Indiana
Dasheen Jackson	S	Alabama State
Deshaun Batiste	DL	Tulane
Caleb Ransaw	CB	Tulane
Steven Cattledge	EDGE	Unknown
Derrick Graham	IOL	Texas A&M
Jabre Barber	WR	Texas A&M
T.J. Jackson	DL	West Virginia
Chris Rodgers	S	Tulane
Jack Tchienchou	S	Tulane
JD Sherrod	QB	Kent State
Blake Austin	OT	Western Kentucky
Keyshawn Swanson	S	Western Kentucky
Zach Edwards	DL	Western Kentucky
Bryce Childress	WR	Western Kentucky
Deyunkrea Lewis	TE	Unknown
Elijah Philippe	OT	Florida A&M
Derek Burns	EDGE	New Mexico State
Joshua Donald	DL	Appalachian State
Elliot Janish	P	Utah
Tim Roberson	CB	Iowa Western CC
Rondell Cole	S	Arkansas Tech
Tavares Williams Jr.	CB	UNC Pembroke
Tyre Young	DB	Andrew
Riley Slaughter	LB	West Virginia Wesleyan

Incoming
Player	Position	Previous school
Jah-Mal Williams	EDGE	Cincinnati
Joshua Donald	DL	Southern
Devin Lafayette	IOL	Northern Illinois
Jordan Perry	LB	Kansas State
Brendan Jackson	LB	Gardner–Webb
Evan Crenshaw	P	Coastal Carolina
Cecil Powell	S	NC State
Trent Henry	CB	Grambling State
Gerald Green	RB	East Carolina
Ian Conerly-Goodly	S	Southeastern Louisiana
Marquez Dortch	WR	California
Montana Wells	QB	Houston Christian
Matthew Caldwell	QB	Gardner–Webb

=== Roster ===
2024 Troy Trojans football team roster
Players
Coaches
Offense

Pos.	#	Name	Class
RB	0	Gerald Green	Sr
WR	1	Landon Parker	Sr
WR	2	Peyton Higgins	Jr
RB	3	Damien Taylor	Jr
RB	4	Jarris Williams	Jr
WR	5	Mojo Dortch	So
WR	6	Chris Lewis	Jr
WR	7	Devonte Ross	Jr
WR	8	Zeriah Beason	Jr
QB	9	Goose Crowder	Jr
QB	10	Tucker Kilcrease	So
QB	11	Caleb McCreary	Fr
QB	12	Matthew Caldwell	Jr
WR	13	Ky McNulty	Fr
TE	14	Ethan Conner	Sr
RB	15	Jordan Lovett	Fr
QB	16	Montana Wells	Fr
WR	17	Roman Mothershed	Fr
WR	19	Jywon Boyd	Fr
WR	20	Isaac Smith	Fr
RB	21	Trevor Pearson	Fr
RB	22	Tae Meadows	So
WR	24	Ian Senn	Fr
RB	26	DeWhitt Betterson Jr.	So
TE	38	Tyler Geary	So
TE	42	Chad Barham	Fr
TE	44	Brooks Mauk	Fr
TE	49	Tyce Khatri	Fr
OL	50	Boaz Stanley	So
OL	54	Caleb Ash	Fr
OL	55	Tavon Matthews	Sr
OL	56	Carlos Slayden	Jr
OL	57	Noah Mercer	Fr
OL	58	Elijah Prather	Fr
OL	62	Logan Potes	Fr
OL	63	Brian Senter	Fr
OL	64	Ricky Timbers	Fr
OL	65	Tyler Cappi	So
OL	66	Eli Russ	Jr
OL	67	Matt Henry	Jr
OL	70	Casey Fua'au	Jr
OL	71	Kyler Gibson	So
OL	72	Obatare Jackson	Fr
OL	73	Tyler Bell	Fr
OL	74	Daniel King	Sr
OL	75	Zerian Hudson	Jr
OL	77	Zak Bowden	Jr
OL	78	Billy Gilmore	Fr
WR	81	Robert Bruce	Sr
WR	82	Jackson Thomas	Fr
WR	83	DJ Epps	So
WR	84	Caleb Chappelle	Jr
TE	85	Fabian Rogosch	So
TE	86	Jackson Worley	Fr
TE	88	Brody Dalton	Jr
TE	89	Trae Swartz	Jr

Defense

Pos.	#	Name	Class
DE	0	Raymond Cutts	Sr
BAN	1	Phillip Lee	Jr
LB	2	Steven Cattledge	Jr
SPR	3	Devin Lafayette	Jr
LB	4	Brendan Jackson	Sr
BAN	5	Jah-Mal Williams	Jr
LB	6	Terry Thomas	Jr
LB	7	Jordan Stringer	Jr
BAN	8	Eric Shaw	Jr
CB	9	Damaje Yancey	Sr
CB	10	Jabari Strait	Jr
SPR	11	Darrell Starling	Jr
CB	12	Trent Henry	Jr
LB	13	TJ Thompson	Jr
S	14	Cecil Powell	Sr
CB	15	Semaj James	Jr
DE	16	Trashun Griffin	Fr
CB	17	Marlin Odom	Fr
SPR	18	Jordan Perry	So
S	19	Kevin Beckham	Fr
LB	20	Keyshawn Campbell	Fr
CB	21	LJ Green	Fr
S	22	OJ Vaughan Jr.	Fr
S	23	KC Bradford	So
S	24	Rondell Carter	Fr
S	25	Justin Powe	So
CB	26	Dorion Jackson	Fr
S	27	John Butler	Jr
BAN	28	AZ Williams	Jr
S	29	Joe Lott	Fr
S	30	Keion Dunlap	Fr
CB	31	Shemar Welch	Fr
S	32	LaBarryon Moore	Fr
CB	33	LaMar Croskey	So
LB	34	Cooper Mason	Fr
BAN	35	Malaki Pegues	Fr
CB	36	EJ Hall	Fr
S	37	Daivon Nelson	Jr
S	38	Krypto Norwood	Jr
S	39	Ian Conerly-Goodly	Jr
CB	40	JaQueraius Thomas	Jr
S	42	Tyrek Thompson	Fr
LB	43	Kam Weaver	Fr
LB	44	Luke Hodge	So
DT	45	Cheick Kaba	Jr
LB	46	Gavyn Baker	Fr
LB	47	Anthony Butler	Sr
DT	51	Jaden Palms	Jr
DE	52	ShuMond Johnson	Fr
DE	53	Jabril McNeill	Jr
DT	54	Cam'Ron Underwood	Fr
DT	69	Jermaine Paramore	Fr
DE	90	Ty'Quarius Perry	Fr
DT	91	Kevin Norwood	Fr
DT	92	Kam Curry	Jr
DE	95	Luis Medina	Jr
DT	96	Dylan Mann	Fr
DT	97	Kenny Reedy	So
DT	98	Jamel Fils-Aime	Jr
DT	99	Julian Peterson	Jr

Special teams

Pos.	#	Name	Class
K	18	Paddy McAteer	So
P	28	Evan Crenshaw	Jr
K	30	Nick Troemel	Fr
K	33	Gage Theus	Jr
K	35	Max Zuluaga	Fr
K	40	Scott Taylor Renfroe	Jr
LS	41	Will Spain	Jr
P	48	Robert Cole	Sr
K	80	Chase Cross	Fr
LS	87	Colton Wals	Fr

Head coach

- Gerad Parker (Kentucky)

Coordinators/assistant coaches

- Sean Reagan (Georgia College & State)
  Offensive coordinator/QB
- Dontae Wright (Miami (OH))
  Defensive coordinator/S
- Gary Banks (Troy)
  Wide receivers
- Chris Boone (Southern Miss)
  Outside linebackers
- Re'quan Boyette (Duke
  Running backs
- Nathan Burton (Georgia Tech)
  Co-defensive coordinator/ILB
- Caleb Carbine (Troy)
  Offensive linemen
- Justin Manning (North Carolina Central)
  Defensive linemen
- Travis Pearson (Alabama State)
  Cornerbacks
- Kevin Reihner (Stanford)
  Tight ends/tackles
- Darl Bauer (Hillsdale)
  Director of strength and performance
- A. J. Pierce (Troy)
  Defensive graduate assistant

Legend

- (C) Team captain
- (S) Suspended
- (I) Ineligible
- Injured
- Redshirt

Roster
Last update: 19 January 2025
