= Matthew Caldwell (American football) =

American football player (born 2003)

No. 2 – Los Angeles Rams
- Position: Quarterback
- Roster status: Injured reserve

Personal information
- Born: May 23, 2003 (age 23); Auburn, Alabama, U.S.
- Listed height: 6 ft 3 in (1.91 m)
- Listed weight: 213 lb (97 kg)

Career information
- High school: Auburn (Auburn, Alabama)
- College: Jacksonville State (2021); Gardner–Webb (2022–2023); Troy (2024); Texas (2025)
- NFL draft: 2026: undrafted

Career history
- Los Angeles Rams (2026–present)
- Stats at Pro Football Reference

Matthew Caldwell (born May 23, 2003) is an American professional football quarterback for the Los Angeles Rams of the National Football League (NFL). He played college football for the Texas Longhorns, Troy Trojans, Jacksonville State Gamecocks, and Gardner–Webb Runnin' Bulldogs.

== Early life ==
Caldwell attended Auburn High School located in Auburn, Alabama. Coming out of high school, committed to play college football for the Jacksonville State Gamecocks.

== College career ==
=== Jacksonville State ===
During his first collegiate season in 2021, Caldwell played in three games, completing 14 of his 30 pass attempts for 136 yards, while also rushing for 27 yards and a touchdown. After the conclusion of the 2021 season, he decided to enter his name into the NCAA transfer portal.

=== Gardner–Webb ===
Caldwell transferred to play for the Gardner–Webb Runnin' Bulldogs. During his two seasons at Gardner–Webb from 2022 through 2023, he completed 114 of his 183 passes for 1,083 yards and six touchdowns. After the conclusion of the 2023 season, Caldwell decided to once again enter his name into the NCAA transfer portal.

=== Troy ===
Caldwell transferred to play for the Troy Trojans. In week twelve of the 2024 season, he completed 26 of 32 passes for 288 yards, while totaling four touchdowns, in a victory versus Georgia Southern. Caldwell finished the 2024 season, appearing in ten games, completing 63.2 percent of his passes for 1,608 yards, 13 touchdowns and eight interceptions, while also adding five scores on the ground. After the conclusion of the 2024 season, he decided to enter his name into the NCAA transfer portal for the third time.

=== Texas ===
Caldwell transferred to play for the Texas Longhorns. In Week 9 of the 2025 season, he threw a 10-yard game-winning touchdown to Emmett Mosley in the overtime win over Mississippi State.

=== Statistics ===
Season	Team	Games			Passing								Rushing			
Season	Team	GP	GS	Record	Cmp	Att	Pct	Yds	Y/A	TD	Int	Rtg	Att	Yds	Avg	TD
2021	Jacksonville State (Note: In the 2021 season, Jacksonville State participated in the FCS. Caldwell's career FCS totals are counted from 2021–2023.)	3	1	1–0	14	30	47.0	136	4.5	0	1	78.1	5	27	5.4	1
2022	Gardner-Webb	6	1	0–1	33	55	60.0	374	6.8	1	3	112.2	13	15	1.2	2
2023	Gardner-Webb	5	5	2–3	81	128	63.3	709	5.2	5	3	118.0	24	84	3.5	1
2024	Troy	10	6	3–3	149	223	63.2	1,608	7.2	13	8	7.2	48	47	1.0	5
2025	Texas	7	0	—	8	11	72.7	85	7.7	1	0	167.6	2	64	32.0	0
FCS career		14	7	3–4	148	262	56.5	1,438	5.5	8	7	107.3	42	126	3.0	4
FBS career		17	6	3–3	149	234	63.7	1,693	7.2	14	8	137.4	50	111	2.2	5

== Professional career ==
Pre-draft measurables
Height	Weight	Arm length	Hand span	Wingspan	40-yard dash	10-yard split	20-yard split	20-yard shuttle	Vertical jump	Broad jump
6 ft 2 3/4 in (1.90 m)	213 lb (97 kg)	30 1/2 in (0.77 m)	9 1/2 in (0.24 m)	6 ft 3 1/8 in (1.91 m)	4.64 s	1.68 s	2.71 s	4.34 s	34.5 in (0.88 m)	10 ft 8 in (3.25 m)
All values from Pro Day

Caldwell signed with the Los Angeles Rams as an undrafted free agent on April 28, 2026, on a three-year contract worth $3.1 million. He was placed on season–ending injured reserve on August 29.
