= 2024 Georgia Southern Eagles football team =

American college football season

2024 Georgia Southern Eagles football

New Orleans Bowl, L 26–31 vs. Sam Houston
- Conference: Sun Belt Conference
- East Division
- Record: 8–5 (6–2 Sun Belt)
- Head coach: Clay Helton (3rd season)
- Offensive coordinator: Ryan Aplin (1st season)
- Offensive scheme: Multiple
- Defensive coordinator: Brandon Bailey (2nd season)
- Base defense: 4–2–5
- Home stadium: Paulson Stadium

2024 Sun Belt Conference football standings
	Conf.			Overall
Team	W		L	W		L
East Division
Marshall xy$	7	–	1	10	–	3
Georgia Southern	6	–	2	8	–	5
James Madison	4	–	4	9	–	4
Old Dominion	4	–	4	5	–	7
Coastal Carolina	3	–	5	6	–	7
Appalachian State	3	–	5	5	–	6
Georgia State	1	–	7	3	–	9
West Division
Louisiana xy	7	–	1	10	–	4
Texas State	5	–	3	8	–	5
Arkansas State	5	–	3	8	–	5
South Alabama	5	–	3	7	–	6
Louisiana–Monroe	3	–	5	5	–	7
Troy	3	–	5	4	–	8
Southern Miss	0	–	8	1	–	11
Championship: Marshall 31, Louisiana 3
$ – Conference champion; x – Division champion/co-champions; y – Championship game participant

The 2024 Georgia Southern Eagles football team represented Georgia Southern University in the Sun Belt Conference's East Division during the 2024 NCAA Division I FBS football season. The Eagles were led by Clay Helton in his third year as the head coach. The Eagles played their home games at Paulson Stadium, located in Statesboro, Georgia.

== Preseason ==
=== Media poll ===
In the Sun Belt preseason coaches' poll, the Eagles were picked to finish fourth place in the East division.

Runningback Jalen White and wide receiver Derwin Burgess Jr. were awarded to be in the preseason All-Sun Belt first team offense. Linebacker Marques Waston-Trent and defensive linemen Justin Rhodes and Isaac Walker were named to the All-Sun Belt first team defense.

Offensive linemen Chandler Strong and Pinchon Wimbley, defensive back TJ Smith, and returner DeAndre Buchannon were named to the second team.

== Personnel ==
2024 Georgia Southern Eagles football team roster
Players
Coaches
Offense

Pos.	#	Name	Class
WR	1	Dalen Cobb	Jr
WR	2	Derwin Burgess Jr.	Sr
WR	4	LV Bunkley-Shelton
WR	5	Marcus Sanders Jr.	Jr
QB	6	Tyler Budge	Fr
TE	7	Tyler Fromm
QB	9	Dexter Williams II	Sr
QB	10	David Dallas	So
TE	11	Beau Johnson
QB	12	JC French	So
WR	14	Sam Kenerson	Sr
WR	15	DeAndre Buchannon	So
QB	16	Colton FitzGerald	Jr
WR	18	KD Dorsey	So
QB	18	Trey Townsend	Fr
WR	19	Josh Dallas	So
RB	20	Terrance Gibbs	So
RB	21	David Mbadinga	So
RB	22	OJ Arnold	Jr
WR	23	Carmelo Mays	Fr
WR	24	Joshua Thompson	Jr
RB	25	Jalen White
RB	26	Antavious Murphy	Fr
RB	27	Deuce Petty	Jr
RB	28	J'Shawn Anderson	Fr
RB	29	Jamarian Samuel	Jr
RB	30	Robert Edwards III	So
RB	31	Alan Woods III	Fr
RB	33	Bryce Baker	Fr
RB	35	Taeo Todd	Fr
WR	38	Kevin Douglas	Fr
TE	47	Khai Isaac	Fr
TE	48	Aubrey Heath	Fr
OL	50	Jaylen Slaughter	Fr
OL	51	Matthew Williams	Fr
OL	54	Chance Carroll	Sr
OL	55	Ethan Williams	Fr
OL	56	Bryce Miller	Fr
OL	57	Chandler Strong	So
OL	58	Kyle Frazier
OL	62	Dom Boyd
OL	63	Colin Alexander	Fr
OL	64	Caelan Williams	Sr
OL	66	Johnnie Brown III	So
OL	70	Jalen Burgess	Fr
OL	71	Robert Wright Jr.	Fr
OL	73	Zach Pearson	Fr
OL	74	Pichon Wimbley	Jr
OL	75	Bryson Broadway
OL	76	Kingtriton Samuela	Fr
OL	78	Caleb Cook	Jr
OL	79	Weston Wallace	Sr
WR	80	Jordan Woolen	Fr
TE	83	Elija Walton	Fr
TE	84	JP Mikhael	Fr
WR	85	Brooks Pangle	So
TE	87	Evan Lester Jr.	Jr
WR	89	Taylor Bradshaw	Fr

Defense

Pos.	#	Name	Class
LB	1	Marques Watson-Trent	Sr
LB	4	Davon Hicks	Jr
DB	5	TJ Smith	Sr
DB	6	Cam Williams
DL	7	Isaac Walker	Jr
DB	9	Justin Meyers	Jr
LB	10	Jacob Hammonds	So
DB	11	Deontre Morris	Jr
DB	12	Tracy Hill Jr.	So
DB	13	Ethan Pouncey	Sr
DB	14	Prince Green	Jr
LB	15	Davon Gilmore
DB	16	Tyrell Davis	Jr
LB	17	Reid Dedman
DL	18	MJ Stroud	So
DL	20	Jaquari Brown	Fr
DB	21	Caimon Mathis	Fr
DB	22	Marc Stampley II	Jr
DB	23	Dorrian Smith	Jr
DB	24	Phillip Gladney	Fr
DB	25	Ayden Jackson	So
DB	26	Chris Crouch	Jr
DB	27	Isaiah Screen	Jr
DB	28	Elijah McDowell	Fr
DB	29	Devin Collier	Fr
LB	30	CJ Allen	Fr
RB	31	Chance Gamble	Jr
DB	32	Jaylen Bentley	Fr
LB	33	Holden Trice	Fr
LB	34	Jamari Whitehead	Fr
LB	35	Demarcious Robinson	Jr
DB	36	Jadaan Cooper	Fr
DB	38	Jeremiah Holmes	Jr
DB	39	Temirez Williams	Fr
LB	41	Brandon Alford	Fr
DL	42	Branden Palmer	Fr
DB	44	Jeffrey Smyth
LB	48	Zack Blackwell	So
DB	49	Amar Jenkins	So
DL	50	Johnathan Douglas	Sr
DL	51	Kebba Secka	Fr
DL	52	Jacob Ferguson	Sr
DL	53	Trevon Locke	Sr
DL	55	Korey Jordan	Fr
DL	56	Kyron Anderson	Fr
DL	57	Latrell Bullard	Jr
DL	70	Korbett MacGregor	So
DL	88	Justin Rhodes
DL	90	Da'Shawn Davis	Jr
DL	91	Davion Rhodes	Jr
DL	92	Kristian Varner
DL	93	Troy Pikes	Fr
DL	94	Elhadj Fall	So
DL	95	Alijah Lacey	Fr
DL	96	Lonnie Leverette	Jr
DL	97	Eli Anders	Fr
DL	99	Nasir Smith	Fr

Special teams

Pos.	#	Name	Class
LS	40	Wyatt Darlington	Fr
P	81	Alex Smith	So
P	82	Matthew Daniel
K	88	Gavin Stewart
LS	89	Jackson Wheeler	Sr
LS	93	Gaines Wood	So
LS	94	Bryce Bernard	Sr
K	96	Chase Folser	So
K	98	TJ Hartley	Fr
P	99	Walker Bradberry	Jr

Head coach

- Clay Helton (Houston)

Coordinators/assistant coaches

- Ryan Aplin (Arkansas State)
  Offensive coordinator/quarterbacks
- Brandon Bailey (Georgia Southern)
  Defensive coordinator/safeties
- Darius Eubanks (Georgia Southern)
  Linebackers/run game coordinator
- BJ Johnson (Georgia Southern)
  Wide receivers
- Zach Lankford (UAB)
  Offensive line/run game coordinator
- Taylor Reed (Central Arkansas)
  Running backs
- Rip Rowan (Austin Peay)
  Defensive line
- Darius Safford (Lafayette)
  Defensive backs
- Clint Trickett (Florida State)
  Tight ends/inside receivers/pass game coordinator
- Turner West (Memphis)
  Special teams coordinator
- Taylor Housewright (Ashland)
  Senior offensive analyst

Legend

- (C) Team captain
- (S) Suspended
- (I) Ineligible
- Injured
- Redshirt

Roster
Last update: 27 September 2024

== Schedule ==
The football schedule was announced on March 1, 2024.

Date	Time	Opponent	Site	TV	Result	Attendance
August 31	4:00 p.m.	Boise State*	Paulson Stadium; Statesboro, GA	ESPNU	L 45–56	24,134
September 7	7:00 p.m.	at Nevada*	Mackay Stadium; Reno, NV	TruTV	W 20–17	16,245
September 14	6:00 p.m.	South Carolina State*	Paulson Stadium; Statesboro, GA	ESPN+	W 42–14	21,617
September 21	7:45 p.m.	at No. 5 Ole Miss*	Vaught-Hemingway Stadium; Oxford, MS	SECN	L 13–52	67,505
September 28	3:30 p.m.	at Georgia State	Center Parc Stadium; Atlanta, GA (rivalry)	ESPNU	W 38–21	18,808
October 12	8:00 p.m.	Marshall	Paulson Stadium; Statesboro, GA	ESPNU	W 24–23	24,048
October 19	4:00 p.m.	James Madison^{†}	Paulson Stadium; Statesboro, GA	ESPN+	W 28–14	20,153
October 24	7:00 p.m.	at Old Dominion	S.B. Ballard Stadium; Norfolk, VA	ESPN2	L 19–47	18,281
November 2	7:30 p.m.	at South Alabama	Hancock Whitney Stadium; Mobile, AL	ESPNU	W 34–30	19,667
November 16	4:00 p.m.	Troy	Paulson Stadium; Statesboro, GA	ESPN+	L 20–28	21,762
November 23	3:30 p.m.	at Coastal Carolina	Brooks Stadium; Conway, SC	ESPN+	W 26–6	14,556
November 30	6:00 p.m.	Appalachian State	Paulson Stadium; Statesboro, GA (rivalry)	ESPN+	W 29–20	23,383
December 19	7:00 p.m.	vs. Sam Houston*	Caesars Superdome; New Orleans, LA (New Orleans Bowl)	ESPN2	L 26–31	13,151
*Non-conference game; ^{†}Homecoming; Rankings from AP Poll and CFP Rankings released prior to game; All times are in Eastern time

== Game summaries ==
=== Boise State ===
Game One – Boise State Broncos (0–0) at Georgia Southern Eagles (0–0) – Game summary

Quarter	1	2	3	4	Total
Broncos	14	14	8	20	56
Eagles	0	16	14	15	45

at Paulson Stadium • Statesboro, GA

- Date: August 31, 2024
- Game time: 4:00 p.m.
- Game weather: Sunny, 92 °F (33 °C)
- Game attendance: 24,134
- Referee: Trennis Livingston
- TV announcers (ESPNU): Mike Corey (play-by-play) and Rene Ingoglia (analyst)

Game information

First quarter

- (10:28) BSU – Ashton Jeanty 77-yard run, Jonah Dalmas kick (Drive: 1 play, 77 yards, 0:12; Boise State 7–0)
- (2:50) BSU – Ashton Jeanty 26-yard run, Jonah Dalmas kick (Drive: 6 plays, 71 yards, 2:17; Boise State 14–0)

Second quarter

- (13:28) GASO – Jalen White 2-yard run (Drive: 9 plays, 50 yards, 4:15; Boise State 14–6)
- (11:00) GASO – Gavin Stewart 31-yard field goal (Drive: 5 plays, 18 yards, 1:36; Boise State 14–9)
- (9:19) BSU – Ashton Jeanty 1-yard run, Jonah Dalmas kick (Drive: 5 plays, 90 yards, 1:38; Boise State 21–9)
- (2:33) BSU – Ashton Jeanty 5-yard run, Jonah Dalmas kick (Drive: 10 plays, 71 yards, 4:49; Boise State 28–9)
- (0:18) GASO – Dalen Cobb 18-yard pass from JC French, Gavin Stewart kick (Drive: 11 plays, 81 yards, 2:10; Boise State 28–16)

Third quarter

- (11:37) GASO – JC French 11-yard run, Gavin Stewart kick (Drive: 8 plays, 75 yards, 3:23; Boise State 28–23)
- (6:48) GASO – Jalen White 1-yard run, Gavin Stewart kick (Drive: 8 plays, 33 yards, 2:58; Georgia Southern 30–28)
- (1:07) BSU – Ashton Jeanty 1-yard run, Cameron Camper pass (Drive: 14 plays, 75 yards, 5:41; Boise State 36–30)

Fourth quarter

- (13:30) GASO – Beau Johnson 3-yard pass from JC French, Gavin Stewart (Drive: 5 plays, 75 yards, 2:37; Georgia Southern 37–36)
- (13:17) BSU – Ashton Jeanty 75-yard run (Drive: 1 play, 75 yards, 0:13; Boise State 42–37)
- (7:43) BSU – Sire Gaines 38-yard run, Jonah Dalmas kick (Drive: 4 plays, 86 yards, 1:59; Boise State 49–37)
- (5:42) BSU – Sire Gaines 17-yard pass from Maddux Madsen, Jonah Dalmas kick (Drive: 3 plays, 25 yards, 1:33; Boise State 56–37)
- (2:04) GASO – Jalen White 1-yard run, JC French rush (Drive: 11 plays, 65 yards, 3:38; Boise State 56–45)

Statistics	BSU	GASO
First downs	23	27
Total yards	651	461
Rushing yards	371	139
Passing yards	280	322
Passing: Comp–Att–Int	22–31–1	28–50–0
Time of possession	28:31	31:29

Team	Category	Player	Statistics
Boise State	Passing	Maddux Madsen	22/31, 280 yards, TD, INT
Boise State	Rushing	Ashton Jeanty	20 carries, 267 yards, 6 TD
Boise State	Receiving	Cameron Camper	4 receptions, 99 yards
Georgia Southern	Passing	JC French	28/50, 322 yards, 2 TD
Georgia Southern	Rushing	JC French	16 carries, 39 yards, TD
Georgia Southern	Receiving	Derwin Burgess Jr.	4 receptions, 93 yards

=== at Nevada ===
Game Two – Georgia Southern Eagles (0–1) vs Nevada Wolf Pack (1–1) – Game summary

Quarter	1	2	3	4	Total
Eagles	7	10	3	0	20
Wolf Pack	14	0	3	0	17

at Mackay Stadium • Reno, NV

- Date: Saturday September 7, 2024
- Game time: 7:00 PM EST
- Game weather: Sunny
- Game attendance: 16,245
- Referee: Christian Watson
- TV announcers (TruTV): J. B Long (play-by-play), Mike Golic Jr. (analyst) and Nabil Karim (sideline)

Game information

First quarter

- (9:33) NEV – Cortez Braham 15-yard pass from Brendon Lewis, Matthew Killam kick (Drive: 10 plays, 85 yards, 5:24; Nevada 7–0)
- (7:30) GASO – Joshua Thompson 35-yard pass from JC French, Gavin Stewart kick (Drive: 5 plays, 65 yards, 2:03; Tied 7–7)
- (1:08) NEV – Brendon Lewis 2-yard run, Matthew Killam kick (Drive: 12 plays, 75 yards, 6:22; Nevada 14–7)

Second quarter

- (12:15) GASO – Gavin Stewart 30-yard field goal (Drive: 11 plays, 63 yards, 3:53; Nevada 14–10)
- (0:03) GASO – Dalen Cobb 24-yard pass from JC French, Gavin Stewart kick (Drive: 8 plays, 80 yards, 1:48; Georgia Southern 17–14)

Third quarter

- (9:07) GASO – Gavin Stewart 48-yard field goal (Drive: 8 plays, 25 yards, 2:12; Georgia Southern 20–14)
- (2:30) NEV – Matthew Killam 27-yard field goal (Drive: 7 plays, 55 yards, 2:36; Georgia Southern 20–17)

Fourth quarter

No scoring plays

Statistics	GASO	NEV
First downs	20	26
Total yards	285	498
Rushing yards	42	227
Passing yards	243	271
Passing: Comp–Att–Int	23–37–0	23–35–0
Time of possession	22:39	37:21

Team	Category	Player	Statistics
Georgia Southern	Passing	JC French	23/37, 243 yards, 2 TD
Georgia Southern	Rushing	OJ Arnold	7 carries, 23 yards
Georgia Southern	Receiving	Dalen Cobb	7 receptions, 81 yards, TD
Nevada	Passing	Brendon Lewis	23/35, 271 yards, TD
Nevada	Rushing	Brendon Lewis	18 carries, 97 yards, TD
Nevada	Receiving	Cortez Braham	9 receptions, 110 yards, TD

=== South Carolina State (FCS) ===
Game Three – South Carolina State Bulldogs (FCS) (1–1) vs Georgia Southern Eagles (1–1) – Game summary

Quarter	1	2	3	4	Total
Bulldogs (FCS)	0	7	7	0	14
Eagles	7	14	14	7	42

at Paulson Stadium • Statesboro, GA

- Date: Saturday September 14, 2024
- Game time: 6:00 p.m.
- Game weather: Cloudy • Temperature: 76 °F (24 °C)
- Game attendance: 21,617
- Referee: Steven Robinson
- TV announcers (ESPN+): Danny Waugh (play-by-play) and Jared Denk (analyst)

Game information

First quarter

- (8:36) GASO – Tyler Fromm 13-yard pass from JC French, Gavin Stewart kick (Drive: 8 plays, 49 yards, 3:05; Georgia Southern 7–0)

Second quarter

- (13:39) SCST – Deondra Duehart 4-yard run, Kyle Gallegos kick (Drive: 11 plays, 73 yards, 5:13; Tied 7–7)
- (12:07) GASO – Jalen White 1-yard run, Gavin Stewart kick (Drive: 4 plays, 65 yards, 1:26; Georgia Southern 14–7)
- (7:07) GASO – OJ Arnold 14-yard pass from JC French, Gavin Stewart kick (Drive: 6 plays, 50 yards, 3:26; Georgia Southern 21–7)

Third quarter

- (13:27) GASO – OJ Arnold 15-yard run, Gavin Stewart kick (Drive: 5 plays, 59 yards, 1:28; Georgia Southern 28–7)
- (10:48) GASO – Tracy Hill Jr. 60-yard interception, Gavin Stewart kick (Georgia Southern 35–7)
- (5:11) SCST – Deondra Duehart 1-yard run, Gavyn Zimmerman kick (Drive: 9 plays, 75 yards, 5:37; Georgia Southern 35–14)

Fourth quarter

- (2:47) GASO – Jalen White 2-yard run, Gavin Stewart kick (Drive: 13 plays, 80 yards, 8:10; Georgia Southern 42–14)

Statistics	SCST	GASO
First downs	19	21
Total yards	318	351
Rushing yards	112	140
Passing yards	206	211
Passing: Comp–Att–Int	24–38–1	17–24–0
Time of possession	32:38	27:22

Team	Category	Player	Statistics
South Carolina State	Passing	Eric Phoenix	24/37, 206 yards, INT
South Carolina State	Rushing	Eric Phoenix	8 carries, 63 yards
South Carolina State	Receiving	Caden High	10 receptions, 81 yards
Georgia Southern	Passing	JC French	17/23, 211 yards, 2 TD
Georgia Southern	Rushing	OJ Arnold	4 carries, 42 yards, TD
Georgia Southern	Receiving	Josh Dallas	1 reception, 58 yards

=== at No. 5 Ole Miss ===
Game Four – Georgia Southern Eagles (2–1) at No. 5 Ole Miss Rebels (3–0) – Game summary

Quarter	1	2	3	4	Total
Eagles	0	7	3	3	13
No. 5 Rebels	17	7	14	14	52

at Vaught–Hemingway Stadium • Oxford, MS

- Date: Saturday, September 21, 2024
- Game time: 7:45 p.m. EST
- Game weather: Cloudy, 82 °F (28 °C)
- Game attendance: 67,505
- Referee: Steve Marlowe
- TV announcers (SECN): Tom Hart (play-by-play), Jordan Rodgers (analyst), and Cole Cubelic (sideline)

Game information

First quarter

- (14:29) Ole Miss - Antwane Wells Jr. 35 Yd pass from Jaxson Dart (Caden Davis Kick) (Drive: 2 plays, 75 yards, 0:31; Ole Miss 7–0)
- (13:16) Ole Miss - Caden Davis 28 Yd Field Goal (Drive: 4 plays, -2 yards, 1:07; Ole Miss 10–0)
- (4:39) Ole Miss - Jordan Watkins 23 Yd pass from Jaxson Dart (Caden Davis Kick) (Drive: 14 plays, 80 yards, 6:07; Ole Miss 17–0)

Second quarter

- (14:12) Georgia Southern - Derwin Burgess Jr. 12 Yd pass from OJ Arnold (Gavin Stewart Kick) (Drive: 10 plays, 75 yards, 5:27; Ole Miss 17–7)
- (8:08) Ole Miss - Tre Harris 70 Yd pass from Jaxson Dart (Caden Davis Kick) (Drive: 2 plays, 76 yards, 0:35; Ole Miss 24–7)

Third quarter

- (9:00) Ole Miss - JJ Pegues 1 Yd Run (Caden Davis Kick) (Drive: 9 plays, 40 yards, 4:13; Ole Miss 31–7)
- (4:33) Ole Miss - Henry Parrish Jr. 5 Yd Run (Caden Davis Kick) (Drive: 6 plays, 70 yards, 2:25; Ole Miss 38–7)
- (0:14) Georgia Southern - Gavin Stewart 42 Yd Field Goal (Drive: 10 plays, 50 yards, 4:12; Ole Miss 38–10)

Fourth quarter

- (14:30) Ole Miss - Tre Harris 36 Yd pass from Jaxson Dart (Caden Davis Kick) (Drive: 3 plays, 75 yards, 0:44; Ole Miss 45–10)
- (7:37) Ole Miss - Domonique Thomas 1 Yd Run (Caden Davis Kick) (Drive: 5 plays, 47 yards, 1:43; Ole Miss 52–10)
- (1:56) Georgia Southern - Gavin Stewart 33 Yd Field Goal (Drive: 11 plays, 60 yards, 5:41; Ole Miss 52–13)

Statistics	GASO	MISS
First downs	16	26
Total yards	194	607
Rushing yards	37	219
Passing yards	157	388
Passing: Comp–Att–Int	23–33–1	23–33–1
Time of possession	34:26	25:34

Team	Category	Player	Statistics
Georgia Southern	Passing	JC French	20/28, 109 yards
Georgia Southern	Rushing	Jalen White	7 carries, 24 yards
Georgia Southern	Receiving	Derwin Burgess Jr.	5 receptions, 53 yards, TD
Ole Miss	Passing	Jaxson Dart	22/31, 382 yards, 4 TD, INT
Ole Miss	Rushing	Henry Parrish Jr.	13 carries, 89 yards, TD
Ole Miss	Receiving	Tre Harris	11 receptions, 225 yards, 2 TD

=== at Georgia State (rivalry) ===
Game Five – Georgia Southern Eagles (2–2) at Georgia State Panthers (2–1) – Game summary

Quarter	1	2	3	4	Total
Eagles	14	10	7	7	38
Panthers	7	0	14	0	21

at Center Parc Stadium • Atlanta, GA

- Date: Saturday September 28, 2024
- Game time: 3:30 PM
- Game weather: Cloudy
- Game attendance: 18,808
- Referee: Ted Pitts
- TV announcers (ESPNU): Clay Matvick (play-by-play) and Steve Addazio (analyst)

Game information

First quarter

- (6:21) GASO – Josh Dallas 1-yard pass from JC French, Gavin Stewart kick (Drive: 11 plays, 61 yards, 5:41; Georgia Southern 7–0)
- (5:34) GAST – Ted Hurst 76-yard pass from Christian Veilleux, Liam Rickman kick (Drive: 2 plays, 75 yards, 0:47; Tied 7–7)
- (2:54) GASO – OJ Arnold 32-yard run, Gavin Stewart kick (Drive: 7 plays, 82 yards, 2:40; Georgia Southern 14–7)

Second quarter

- (13:54) GASO – Gavin Stewart 53-yard field goal (Drive: 10 plays, 45 yards, 2:43; Georgia Southern 17–7)
- (4:39) GASO – OJ Arnold 1-yard run, Gavin Stewart kick (Drive: 12 plays, 98 yards, 5:31; Georgia Southern 24–7)

Third quarter

- (11:40) GAST – Freddie Brock 1-yard run, Liam Rickman kick (Drive: 2 plays, 6 yards, 0:45; Georgia Southern 24–14)
- (9:22) GAST – Dorian Fleming 58-yard pass from Christian Veilleux, Liam Rickman kick (Drive: 3 plays, 73 yards, 1:08; Georgia Southern 24–21)
- (2:33) GASO – Jalen White 8-yard run, Gavin Stewart kick (Drive: 8 plays, 76 yards, 3:18; Georgia Southern 31–21)

Fourth quarter

- (4:10) GASO – Jalen White 16-yard run, Gavin Stewart kick (Drive: 14 plays, 96 yards, 7:27; Georgia Southern 31–21)

Statistics	GASO	GAST
First downs	30	15
Total yards	498	385
Rushing yards	261	29
Passing yards	237	356
Passing: Comp–Att–Int	24–39–0	23–45–3
Time of possession	39:10	20:50

Team	Category	Player	Statistics
Georgia Southern	Passing	JC French	24/39, 237 yards, TD
Georgia Southern	Rushing	Jalen White	22 carries, 114 yards, 2 TD
Georgia Southern	Receiving	Josh Dallas	9 receptions, 89 yards, TD
Georgia State	Passing	Christian Veilleux	23/45, 356 yards, 2 TD, 3 INT
Georgia State	Rushing	Freddie Brock	10 carries, 36 yards, TD
Georgia State	Receiving	Ted Hurst	4 receptions, 112 yards, TD

=== Marshall ===
Game Six – Marshall Thundering Herd (3–2) at Georgia Southern Eagles (3–2) – Game summary

Quarter	1	2	3	4	Total
Thundering Herd	6	10	7	0	23
Eagles	3	0	0	21	24

at Paulson Stadium • Statesboro, GA

- Date: Saturday October 12, 2024
- Game time: 8:00 p.m.
- Game weather: Sunny • Temperature: 70 °F (21 °C)
- Game attendance: 24,048
- Referee: Trennis Livingston
- TV announcers (ESPNU): Lowell Galindo (play-by-play) and Fozzy Whittaker (analyst)

Game information

First quarter

- (11:56) MRSH – Rece Verhoff 36-yard field goal (Drive: 7 plays, 57 yards, 3:04; Marshall 3–0)
- (5:28) MRSH – Rece Verhoff 51-yard field goal (Drive: 5 plays, -13 yards, 2:38; Marshall 6–0)
- (2:13) GASO – Gavin Stewart 42-yard field goal (Drive: 8 plays, 46 yards, 3:15; Marshall 6–3)

Second quarter

- (12:28) MRSH – Rece Verhoff 42-yard field goal (Drive: 11 plays, 51 yards, 4:45; Marshall 9–3)
- (4:49) MRSH – Toby Payne 3-yard pass from Braylon Braxton, Rece Verhoff kick (Drive: 13 plays, 96 yards, 5:30; Marshall 16–3)

Third quarter

- (7:05) MRSH – Toby Payne 11-yard pass from Braylon Braxton, Rece Verhoff kick (Drive: 7 plays, 80 yards, 3:36; Marshall 23–3)

Fourth quarter

- (10:08) GASO – Cam Williams 0-yard safety (Marshall 23–5)
- (6:31) GASO – Dexter Williams II 1-yard run (Drive: 9 plays, 63 yards, 3:12; Marshall 23–11)
- (2:15) GASO – David Mbadinga 3-yard run, Gavin Stewart kick (Drive: 6 plays, 51 yards, 1:50; Marshall 23–18)
- (1:00) GASO – Derwin Burgess Jr. 34-yard pass from Dexter Williams II (Drive: 7 plays, 66 yards, 0:55; Georgia Southern 24–23)

Statistics	MRSH	GASO
First downs	18	21
Plays–yards	72–389	74–422
Rushes–yards	43–200	33–93
Passing yards	189	329
Passing: Comp–Att–Int	18–29–1	26–41–1
Time of possession	31:03	28:57

Team	Category	Player	Statistics
Marshall	Passing	Stone Earle	9/17, 97 yards, INT
Marshall	Rushing	A. J. Turner	14 carries, 97 yards
Marshall	Receiving	Christian Fitzpatrick	5 receptions, 49 yards
Georgia Southern	Passing	JC French	16/26, 194 yards, INT
Georgia Southern	Rushing	JC French	11 carries, 25 yards
Georgia Southern	Receiving	Dalen Cobb	6 receptions, 93 yards

=== James Madison ===
Game Seven – James Madison Dukes (5–1) at Georgia Southern Eagles (4–2) – Game summary

Quarter	1	2	3	4	Total
Dukes	0	0	7	7	14
Eagles	7	14	7	0	28

at Paulson Stadium • Statesboro, GA

- Date: Saturday October 19, 2024
- Game time: 4:00 p.m.
- Game weather: Sunny • Temperature: 73 °F (23 °C) • Wind: SW 10 miles per hour (16 km/h)
- Game attendance: 20,153
- Referee: Scott Broadway
- TV announcers (ESPN+): Danny Waugh (play-by-play), Jayson Foster (analyst) and Whitney Haworth (sideline)

Game information

First quarter

- (4:23) GASO – David Mbadinga 29-yard run, Gavin Stewart kick (Drive: 6 plays, 78 yards, 2:12; Georgia Southern 7–0)

Second quarter

- (3:48) GASO – Derwin Burgess Jr. 5-yard pass from JC French, Gavin Stewart kick (Drive: 18 plays, 96 yards, 9:14; Georgia Southern 14–0)
- (1:43) GASO – Tyler Fromm 15-yard pass from JC French, Gavin Stewart kick (Drive: 5 plays, 58 yards, 0:42; Georgia Southern 21–0)

Third quarter

- (8:20) JMU – DJ Barksdale 11-yard interception, Max Lipinski kick (Georgia Southern 21–7)
- (4:43) GASO – Elijah Watson 2-yard pass from JC French, Gavin Stewart kick (Drive: 7 plays, 75 yards, 3:37; Georgia Southern 28–7)

Fourth quarter

- (14:32) JMU – Omarion Dollison 35-yard pass from Alonza Barnett III, Max Lipinski kick (Drive: 13 plays, 82 yards, 5:06; Georgia Southern 28–14)

Statistics	JMU	GASO
First downs	16	24
Total yards	253	405
Rushing yards	67	190
Passing yards	186	215
Passing: Comp–Att–Int	22–41–0	24–33–3
Time of possession	26:01	33:59

Team	Category	Player	Statistics
James Madison	Passing	Alonza Barnett III	22/41, 186 yards, TD
James Madison	Rushing	George Pettaway	13 carries, 63 yards
James Madison	Receiving	Omarion Dollison	3 receptions, 51 yards, TD
Georgia Southern	Passing	JC French	24/33, 215 yards, 3 TD, 3 INT
Georgia Southern	Rushing	Jalen White	23 carries, 134 yards
Georgia Southern	Receiving	Derwin Burgess Jr.	5 receptions, 52 yards, TD

=== at Old Dominion ===
Game Eight – Georgia Southern Eagles (5–2) vs Old Dominion Monarchs (3–4) – Game summary

Quarter	1	2	3	4	Total
Eagles	0	7	6	6	19
Monarchs	13	17	14	3	47

at S.B. Ballard Stadium • Norfolk, VA

- Date: October 24, 2024
- Game time: 7:00 PM
- Game weather: Clear • Temperature: 65 °F (18 °C) • Wind: NNW 5 miles per hour (8.0 km/h)
- Game attendance: 18,281
- Referee: Ted Pitts
- TV announcers (ESPN2): Jay Alter (play-by-play) and Rocky Boiman (analyst)

Game information

First quarter

- (8:07) ODU – Devin Roche 8-yard pass from Colton Joseph, Ethan Sanchez kick (Drive: 9 plays, 70 yards, 3:59; ODU 7–0)
- (1:17) ODU – Demariyon Houston 24-yard pass from Colton Joseph, Ethan Sanchez kick blocked (Drive: 11 plays, 82 yards, 5:36; ODU 13–0)

Second quarter

- (13:49) ODU – Pat Conroy 56-yard pass from Colton Joseph, Ethan Sanchez kick (Drive: 1 play, 56 yards, 0:10; ODU 20–0)
- (7:51) GASO – Josh Dallas 59-yard pass from JC French, Gavin Stewart kick (Drive: 3 plays, 62 yards, 0:40; ODU 20–7)
- (3:40) ODU – Ethan Sanchez 29-yard field goal (Drive: 9 plays, 63 yards, 4:11; ODU 23–7)
- (0:46) ODU – Demariyon Houston 7-yard pass from Colton Joseph, Ethan Sanchez kick (Drive: 5 plays, 74 yards, 1:48; ODU 30–7)

Third quarter

- (11:24) ODU – Aaron Young 9-yard run, Ethan Sanchez kick (Drive: 6 plays, 43 yards, 2:58; ODU 37–7)
- (3:24) ODU – Colton Joseph 30-yard run, Ethan Sanchez kick (Drive: 4 plays, 55 yards, 2:02; ODU 44–7)
- (0:24) GASO – Dalen Cobb 55-yard pass from JC French, Gavin Stewart kick failed (Drive: 6 plays, 93 yards, 2:54; ODU 44–13)

Fourth quarter

- (10:37) ODU – Ethan Sanchez 38-yard field goal (Drive: 9 plays, 54 yards, 4:47; ODU 47–13)
- (5:34) GASO – OJ Arnold 4-yard pass from Dexter Williams II, Gavin Stewart kick failed (Drive: 12 plays, 77 yards, 4:57; ODU 47–19)

Statistics	GASO	ODU
First downs	17	26
Total yards	416	560
Rushing yards	113	256
Passing yards	303	304
Passing: Comp–Att–Int	21–36–1	20–27–0
Time of possession	25:08	34:52

Team	Category	Player	Statistics
Georgia Southern	Passing	JC French	17/29, 259 yards, 2 TD, INT
Georgia Southern	Rushing	OJ Arnold	7 carries, 36 yards
Georgia Southern	Receiving	Dalen Cobb	7 receptions, 95 yards, TD
Old Dominion	Passing	Colton Joseph	20/26, 304 yards, 4 TD
Old Dominion	Rushing	Aaron Young	14 carries, 77 yards, TD
Old Dominion	Receiving	Isiah Page	7 receptions, 100 yards

=== at South Alabama ===
Game Nine – Georgia Southern Eagles (5–3) at South Alabama Jaguars (4–4) – Game summary

Quarter	1	2	3	4	Total
Eagles	7	7	0	20	34
Jaguars	3	10	17	0	30

at Hancock Whitney Stadium, Mobile, AL

- Date: Saturday November 2, 2024
- Game time: 7:30 p.m. EDT
- Game weather: Sunny • Temperature: 75 °F (24 °C) • Wind: NW 7 mph
- Game attendance: 19,667
- Referee: Tim Barker
- TV announcers (ESPNU): Lowell Galindo (play-by-play) and Fozzy Whittaker (analyst)

Game information

First Quarter

- (7:30) GASO – David Mbadinga 1-yard run, Gavin Stewart kick (Drive: 16 plays, 81 yards, 7:25; Georgia Southern 7–0)
- (3:30) USA – Laith Marjan 41-yard field goal (Drive: 10 plays, 52 yards, 4:00; Georgia Southern 7–3)

Second Quarter

- (8:17) GASO – Josh Dallas 23-yard pass from JC French, Gavin Stewart kick (Drive: 11 plays, 66 yards, 4:52; Georgia Southern 14–3)
- (4:26) USA – Fluff Bothwell 1-yard run, Laith Marjan kick (Drive: 9 plays, 55 yards, 3:42; Georgia Southern 14–10)
- (0:07) USA – Laith Marjan 35-yard field goal (Drive: 8 plays, 61 yards, 2:17; Georgia Southern 14–13)

Third Quarter

- (10:17) USA – Laith Marjan 24-yard field goal (Drive: 11 plays, 69 yards, 4:43; South Alabama 16–14)
- (5:08) USA – Fluff Bothwell 22-yard run, Laith Marjan kick (Drive: 8 plays, 79 yards, 3:38; South Alabama 23–14)
- (0:34) USA – Jamaal Pritchett 0-yard pass from Gio Lopez, Laith Marjan kick (Drive: 6 plays, 48 yards, 2:23; South Alabama 30–14)

Fourth Quarter

- (14:53) GASO – Josh Dallas 45-yard pass from JC French (Drive: 2 plays, 46 yards, 0:34; South Alabama 30–20)
- (14:09) GASO – Jalen White 2-yard run, Gavin Stewart kick (Drive: 2 plays, 21 yards, 0:35; South Alabama 30–27)
- (8:14) GASO – Dalen Cobb 22-yard pass from Dexter Williams II, Gavin Stewart kick (Drive: 10 plays, 74 yards, 4:47; Georgia Southern 34–30)

Statistics	GASO	USA
First downs	20	25
Total yards	337	458
Rushing yards	106	184
Passing yards	231	274
Passing: Comp–Att–Int	25–33–0	23–32–1
Time of possession	31:52	28:08

Team	Category	Player	Statistics
Georgia Southern	Passing	JC French	22/27, 198 yards, 2 TD
Georgia Southern	Rushing	Jalen White	18 carries, 71 yards, TD
Georgia Southern	Receiving	Josh Dallas	5 receptions, 96 yards, 2 TD
South Alabama	Passing	Gio Lopez	22/30, 257 yards, TD, INT
South Alabama	Rushing	Kentrel Bullock	17 carries, 101 yards
South Alabama	Receiving	Jamaal Pritchett	12 receptions, 107 yards, TD

=== Troy ===
Game Ten – Troy Trojans (2–7) at Georgia Southern Eagles (6–3) – Game summary

Quarter	1	2	3	4	Total
Trojans	0	7	7	14	28
Eagles	7	3	7	3	20

at Paulson Stadium, Statesboro, GA

- Date: Saturday November 16, 2024
- Game time: 4:00 p.m. EST
- Game weather: Sunny • Temperature: 69 °F (21 °C)
- Game attendance: 21,762
- Referee: Marshall Lewis
- TV announcers (ESPN+): Danny Waugh (play-by-play), Jayson Foster (analyst) and Whitney Haworth (sideline)

Game information

First Quarter

- (1:56) GASO – Josh Dallas 4-yard run, Gavin Stewart kick (Drive: 12 plays, 80 yards, 5:44; Georgia Southern 7–0)

Second Quarter

- (14:23) TROY – Brody Dalton 6-yard pass from Matthew Caldwell, Scott Taylor Renfroe kick (Drive: 5 plays, 75 yards, 2:33; Tied 7–7)
- (0:27) GASO – Gavin Stewart 21-yard field goal (Drive: 10 plays, 82 yards, 2:28; Georgia Southern 10–7)

Third Quarter

- (7:50) TROY – Devonte Ross 4-yard pass from Matthew Caldwell, Scott Taylor Renfroe kick (Drive: 11 plays, 71 yards, 5:48; Troy 14–10)
- (2:34) GASO – OJ Arnold 1-yard run, Gavin Stewart kick (Drive: 10 plays, 75 yards, 5:16; Georgia Southern 17–14)

Fourth Quarter

- (13:34) TROY – Matthew Caldwell 2-yard run, Scott Taylor Renfroe kick (Drive: 7 plays, 75 yards, 4:00; Troy 21–17)
- (10:43) GASO – Gavin Stewart 45-yard field goal (Drive: 6 plays, 48 yards, 2:51; Troy 21–20)
- (2:32) TROY – Matthew Caldwell 1-yard run, Scott Taylor Renfroe kick (Drive: 16 plays, 75 yards, 8:11; Troy 28–20)

Statistics	TROY	GASO
First downs	27	19
Total yards	441	246
Rushing yards	153	75
Passing yards	288	171
Passing: Comp–Att–Int	26–32–0	17–28–1
Time of possession	38:31	21:29

Team	Category	Player	Statistics
Troy	Passing	Matthew Caldwell	26/32, 288 yards, 2 TD
Troy	Rushing	Damien Taylor	18 carries, 92 yards
Troy	Receiving	Devonte Ross	10 receptions, 95 yards, TD
Georgia Southern	Passing	JC French	17/28, 171 yards, INT
Georgia Southern	Rushing	OJ Arnold	6 carries, 27 yards, TD
Georgia Southern	Receiving	Josh Dallas	4 receptions, 69 yards

=== at Coastal Carolina ===
Game Eleven – Georgia Southern Eagles (6–4) at Coastal Carolina Chanticleers (5–5) – Game summary

Quarter	1	2	3	4	Total
Eagles	10	3	0	13	26
Chanticleers	3	0	3	0	6

at Brooks Stadium, Conway, SC

- Date: Saturday November 23, 2024
- Game time: 3:30 p.m. EST
- Game weather: Sunny • Temperature: 60 °F (16 °C)
- Game attendance: 14,556
- Referee: Ted Pitts
- TV announcers (ESPN+): Jeff McCarragher (play-by-play) and Nate Ross (analyst)

Game information

First Quarter

- (8:17) GASO – Gavin Stewart 22-yard field goal (Drive: 15 plays, 71 yards, 6:43; Georgia Southern 3–0)
- (6:55) GASO – Marcus Sanders Jr. 30-yard pass from JC French, Gavin Stewart kick (Drive: 2 plays, 55 yards, 0:30; Georgia Southern 10–0)
- (2:46) CCU – Kade Hensley 39-yard field goal (Drive: 9 plays, 54 yards, 4:09; Georgia Southern 10–3)

Second Quarter

- (1:29) GASO – Gavin Stewart 27-yard field goal (Drive: 9 plays, 32 yards, 4:18; Georgia Southern 13–3)

Third Quarter

- (12:43) CCU – Kade Hensley 24-yard field goal (Drive: 6 plays, 69 yards, 2:17; Georgia Southern 13–6)

Fourth Quarter

- (14:56) GASO – Gavin Stewart 36-yard field goal (Drive: 16 plays, 72 yards, 7:09; Georgia Southern 16–6)
- (5:56) GASO – Jalen White 2-yard run, Gavin Stewart kick (Drive: 2 plays, 2 yards, 0:09; Georgia Southern 23–6)
- (3:18) GASO – Gavin Stewart 39-yard field goal (Drive: 4 plays, 4 yards, 2:14; Georgia Southern 26–6)

Statistics	GASO	CCU
First downs	21	12
Total yards	384	280
Rushing yards	90	163
Passing yards	294	117
Passing: Comp–Att–Int	25–38–0	11–32–3
Time of possession	38:45	21:15

Team	Category	Player	Statistics
Georgia Southern	Passing	JC French	25/38, 294 yards, TD
Georgia Southern	Rushing	Jalen White	13 carries, 46 yards, TD
Georgia Southern	Receiving	Derwin Burgess Jr.	8 receptions, 98 yards
Coastal Carolina	Passing	Ethan Vasko	10/25, 92 yards, 2 INT
Coastal Carolina	Rushing	Braydon Bennett	16 carries, 138 yards
Coastal Carolina	Receiving	Senika McKie	5 receptions, 78 yards

=== Appalachian State (rivalry) ===
Game Twelve – Appalachian State Mountaineers (5–5) at Georgia Southern Eagles (7–4) – Game summary

Quarter	1	2	3	4	Total
Mountaineers	0	6	7	7	20
Eagles	8	7	0	14	29

at Paulson Stadium, Statesboro, GA

- Date: Saturday November 30, 2024
- Game time: 6:00 p.m. EST
- Game weather: Sunny • Temperature: 40 °F (4 °C)
- Game attendance: 23,383
- Referee: Jeremy Parker
- TV announcers (ESPN+): Danny Waugh, Jason Foster

Game information

First Quarter

- (8:47) GASO – Josh Dallas 10-yard pass from JC French, Matthew Daniel two-point conversion rush (Drive: 12 plays, 75 yards, 6:13; Georgia Southern 8–0)

Second Quarter

- (8:48) APP – Eli Wilson 9-yard pass from Joey Aguilar, Two-point pass conversion attempt failed (Drive: 10 plays, 61 yards, 5:27; Georgia Southern 8–6)
- (2:51) GASO – Jalen White 4-yard rush, Gavin Stewart kick (Drive: 11 plays, 84 yards, 5:51; Georgia Southern 15–6)

Third Quarter

- (4:33) APP – Makai Jackson 6-yard pass from Joey Aguilar, Michael Hughes kick (Drive: 12 plays, 65 yards, 6:03; Georgia Southern 15–13)

Fourth Quarter

- (13:36) GASO – Jalen White 3-yard rush, Gavin Stewart kick (Drive: 11 plays, 75 yards, 5:57; Georgia Southern 22–13)
- (8:16) APP – Ahmani Marshall 1-yard rush, Michael Hughes kick (Drive: 2 plays, 41 yards, 0:20; Georgia Southern 22–20)
- (1:05) GASO – Jalen White 35-yard rush, Gavin Stewart kick (Drive: 8 plays, 86 yards, 2:47; Georgia Southern 29–20)

Statistics	APP	GASO
First downs	25	23
Total yards	465	357
Rushing yards	175	191
Passing yards	290	166
Passing: Comp–Att–Int	19-35-2	16-19-0
Time of possession	30:33	29:27

Team	Category	Player	Statistics
Appalachian State	Passing	Joey Aguilar	19/35, 290 yards, 2 TDs, 2 INTs
Appalachian State	Rushing	Ahmani Marshall	24 carries, 127 yards, 1 TD
Appalachian State	Receiving	Makai Jackson	8 receptions, 157 yards, 1 TD
Georgia Southern	Passing	JC French	16/19, 166 yards, 1 TD
Georgia Southern	Rushing	Jalen White	18 carries, 175 yards, 3 TDs
Georgia Southern	Receiving	Josh Dallas	4 receptions, 53 yards, 1 TD

=== Sam Houston (New Orleans Bowl) ===
2024 R+L Carriers New Orleans Bowl
Georgia Southern Eagles (8-4, 6-2) at Sam Houston Bearkats (9-3, 6-2)

Quarter	1	2	3	4	Total
Eagles	0	10	9	7	26
Bearkats	7	14	0	10	31

at Caesars Superdome • New Orleans, Louisiana

- Date: Thursday, December 19, 2024
- Game time: 7:00 p.m. EST
- TV announcers (ESPN2): Jorge Sedano (play-by-play), Orlando Franklin (analyst), and Morgan Uber (sideline) (ESPN2)/Dave Neal (play-by-play) and Aaron Murray (analyst) (ESPN Radio)

Game information

First quarter
Second quarter
Third quarter
Fourth quarter

Statistics	GASO	SHSU
First downs	23	15
Total yards	393	267
Rushing yards	181	54
Passing yards	212	213
Passing: Comp–Att–Int	20-35-4	23-28-0
Time of possession	31:49	28:11

Team	Category	Player	Statistics
Georgia Southern	Passing	JC French	20/33, 212 yards, 1 TD, 4 INTs
Georgia Southern	Rushing	Jalen White	16 carries, 90 yards, 1 TD
Georgia Southern	Receiving	Derwin Burgess Jr.	6 receptions, 56 yards
Sam Houston	Passing	Hunter Watson	23/28, 213 yards, 1 TD
Sam Houston	Rushing	Jay Ducker	10 carries, 26 yards
Sam Houston	Receiving	Simeon Evans	7 receptions, 85 yards, 1 TD
