= 2024 Georgia State Panthers football team =

American college football season

2024 Georgia State Panthers football
- Conference: Sun Belt Conference
- East Division
- Record: 3–9 (1–7 Sun Belt)
- Head coach: Dell McGee (1st season)
- Offensive coordinator: Jim Chaney (1st season)
- Offensive scheme: Pro-style
- Defensive coordinator: Kevin Sherrer (1st season)
- Base defense: 4–2–5
- Home stadium: Center Parc Stadium

2024 Sun Belt Conference football standings
	Conf.			Overall
Team	W		L	W		L
East Division
Marshall xy$	7	–	1	10	–	3
Georgia Southern	6	–	2	8	–	5
James Madison	4	–	4	9	–	4
Old Dominion	4	–	4	5	–	7
Coastal Carolina	3	–	5	6	–	7
Appalachian State	3	–	5	5	–	6
Georgia State	1	–	7	3	–	9
West Division
Louisiana xy	7	–	1	10	–	4
Texas State	5	–	3	8	–	5
Arkansas State	5	–	3	8	–	5
South Alabama	5	–	3	7	–	6
Louisiana–Monroe	3	–	5	5	–	7
Troy	3	–	5	4	–	8
Southern Miss	0	–	8	1	–	11
Championship: Marshall 31, Louisiana 3
$ – Conference champion; x – Division champion/co-champions; y – Championship game participant

The 2024 Georgia State Panthers football team represented Georgia State University in the Sun Belt Conference's East Division during the 2024 NCAA Division I FBS football season. The Panthers were led by a new head coach, Dell McGee, who inherited a strong 2024 recruiting class from his predecessor, Shawn Elliott, including McGee's son Austin McGee, Damaine Wilson of Florida, and Indiana tight end Lane Wadle. The Panthers played their home games at the Center Parc Stadium, located in Atlanta, Georgia.

== Preseason ==
=== Media poll ===
In the Sun Belt preseason coaches' poll, the Panthers were picked to finish in last place in the East division.

Cornerback Galvin Pringle was named to the preseason All-Sun Belt first team defense. Linebacker Kevin Swint was named to the second team.

== Schedule ==
The football schedule was announced on March 1, 2024.

Date	Time	Opponent	Site	TV	Result	Attendance
August 31	8:00 p.m.	at Georgia Tech*	Bobby Dodd Stadium; Atlanta, GA	ACCN	L 12–35	40,113
September 7	7:00 p.m.	No. 11 (FCS) Chattanooga*	Center Parc Stadium; Atlanta, GA	ESPN+	W 24–21	N/A
September 14	7:00 p.m.	Vanderbilt*	Center Parc Stadium; Atlanta, GA	ESPN+	W 36–32	14,413
September 28	3:30 p.m.	Georgia Southern	Center Parc Stadium; Atlanta, GA (rivalry)	ESPNU	L 21–38	18,808
October 12	3:30 p.m.	Old Dominion	Center Parc Stadium; Atlanta, GA	ESPN+	L 14–21	12,280
October 17	7:00 p.m.	at Marshall	Joan C. Edwards Stadium; Huntington, WV	ESPN2	L 20–35	20,703
October 26	1:00 p.m.	at Appalachian State	Kidd Brewer Stadium; Boone, NC	ESPN+	L 26–33	33,783
November 1	7:00 p.m.	at UConn*	Rentschler Field; East Hartford, CT	CBSSN	L 27–34	22,028
November 9	3:30 p.m.	at James Madison	Bridgeforth Stadium; Harrisonburg, VA	ESPN+	L 7–38	25,709
November 16	5:00 p.m.	Arkansas State^{†}	Center Parc Stadium; Atlanta, GA	ESPN+	L 20–27	14,047
November 23	7:00 p.m.	at Texas State	UFCU Stadium; San Marcos, TX	ESPN+	W 52–44	18,271
November 30	2:00 p.m.	Coastal Carolina	Center Parc Stadium; Atlanta, GA	ESPN+	L 27–48	12,606
*Non-conference game; ^{†}Homecoming; Rankings from AP Poll and CFP Rankings released prior to game; All times are in Eastern time

== Game summaries ==
=== at Georgia Tech ===
Game One – Georgia State Panthers (0–0) vs Georgia Tech Yellow Jackets (1–0) – Game summary

Quarter	1	2	3	4	Total
Panthers	0	3	9	0	12
Yellow Jackets	7	7	14	7	35

at Bobby Dodd Stadium, Atlanta, Georgia

- Date: Saturday August 31, 2024
- Game time: 8:00 PM
- Game weather: Sunny, 84 °F (29 °C)
- Game attendance: 40,113
- Referee: Kyle Olson
- TV announcers (ACCN): Wes Durham (play-by-play), Tom Luginbill (analyst), and Dana Boyle (sideline reporter)

Game information

First quarter

- GT – Jamal Haynes 1-yard run (Aidan Birr kick), 3:01. Yellow Jackets 7–0. Drive: 6 plays, 20 yards, 2:34.

Second quarter

- GAST – Liam Rickman 21-yard field goal, 3:49. Yellow Jackets 7–3. Drive: 16 plays, 87 yards, 8:24.
- GT – Haynes King 2-yard run (Aidan Birr kick), 0:04. Yellow Jackets 14–3. Drive: 11 plays, 75 yards, 3:45.

Third quarter

- GT – Eric Singleton Jr. 35-yard run (Aidan Birr kick), 13:01. Yellow Jackets 21–3. Drive: 4 plays, 65 yards, 1:59.
- GT – Malik Rutherford 52-yard pass from Haynes King (Aidan Birr kick), 11:19. Yellow Jackets 28–3. Drive: 1 play, 52 yards, 0:08.
- GAST – Liam Rickman 47-yard field goal, 9:52. Yellow Jackets 28–6. Drive: 6 plays, 45 yards, 1:27.
- GAST – Dorian Fleming 24-yard pass from Christian Veilleux (pass failed), 3:42. Yellow Jackets 28–12. Drive: 9 plays, 68 yards, 4:08.

Fourth quarter

- GT – Avery Boyd 22-yard pass from Haynes King (Aidan Birr kick), 14:14. Yellow Jackets 35–12. Drive: 9 plays, 75 yards, 4:28.

Statistics	GAST	GT
First downs	19	22
Total yards	360	499
Rushing yards	210	274
Passing yards	150	225
Passing: Comp–Att–Int	19–34–0	25–30–1
Time of possession	29:58	30:02

Team	Category	Player	Statistics
Georgia State	Passing	Christian Veilleux	19/34, 210 yards, TD
Georgia State	Rushing	Freddie Brock	10 rushes, 61 yards
Georgia State	Receiving	Dorian Fleming	4 receptions, 68 yards, TD
Georgia Tech	Passing	Haynes King	24/29, 275 yards, 2 TD, INT
Georgia Tech	Rushing	Jamal Haynes	17 rushes, 84 yards, TD
Georgia Tech	Receiving	Malik Rutherford	7 receptions, 131 yards, TD

=== No. 11 (FCS) Chattanooga ===
Game Two – No. 11 (FCS) Chattanooga Mocs (0–1) vs Georgia State Panthers (0–1) – Game summary

Quarter	1	2	3	4	Total
No. 11 (FCS) Mocs	7	0	7	7	21
Panthers	3	7	7	7	24

at Center Parc Stadium, Atlanta, Georgia

- Date: Saturday September 7, 2024
- Game time: 7:00 PM
- Game weather: Sunny
- Referee: Bob Smith
- TV announcers (ESPN+): Matt Stewart (play-by-play), Sam Crenshaw (analyst) and Kevin Barnes (sideline)

Game information

First quarter

- (7:16) GAST – Liam Rickman 44-yard field goal (Drive: 7 plays, 25 yards, 3:07; Georgia State 3–0)
- (1:27) UTC – Dalton Restelli 1-yard pass from Chase Artopoeus, Jude Kelley kick (Drive: 11 plays, 75 yards, 5:49; Chattanooga 7–3)

Second quarter

- (12:31) GAST – Jordan Ford 19-yard pass from Christian Veilleux, Liam Rickman kick (Drive: 9 plays, 64 yards, 3:56; Georgia State 10–7)

Third quarter

- (10:56) UTC – Reggie Davis 2-yard run, Jude Kelley kick (Drive: 3 plays, 10 yards, 1:26; Chattanooga 14–10)
- (7:35) GAST – Ted Hurst 22-yard pass from Christian Veilleux, Liam Rickman kick (Drive: 7 plays, 75 yards, 3:21; Georgia State 17–14)

Fourth quarter

- (11:33) UTC – Sam Phillips 84-yard pass from Chase Artopoeus, Jude Kelley kick (Drive: 4 plays, 98 yards, 2:36; Chattanooga 21–17)
- (7:01) GAST – Freddie Brock 12-yard run, Liam Rickman kick (Drive: 9 plays, 59 yards, 4:32; Georgia State 24–21)

Statistics	UTC	GAST
First downs	13	22
Total yards	308	391
Rushing yards	76	153
Passing yards	232	238
Passing: Comp–Att–Int	13–23–2	26–38–0
Time of possession	26:23	33:37

Team	Category	Player	Statistics
Chattanooga	Passing	Chase Artopoeus	13/23, 232 yards, 2 TD, 2 INT
Chattanooga	Rushing	Reggie Davis	19 carries, 68 yards, TD
Chattanooga	Receiving	Sam Phillips	8 receptions, 195 yards, TD
Georgia State	Passing	Christian Veilleux	26/38, 238 yards, 2 TD
Georgia State	Rushing	Freddie Brock	14 carries, 73 yards, TD
Georgia State	Receiving	Ted Hurst	6 receptions, 83 yards, TD

=== Vanderbilt ===
Game Three – Vanderbilt Commodores (2–0) vs Georgia State Panthers (1–1) – Game summary

Quarter	1	2	3	4	Total
Commodores	0	10	0	22	32
Panthers	3	9	10	14	36

at Center Parc Stadium, Atlanta, Georgia

- Date: Saturday September 14, 2024
- Game time: 7:00 PM
- Game weather: Sunny
- Game attendance: 14,413
- Referee: Matt Loeffler
- TV announcers (ESPN+): Matt Stewart (play-by-play) and Sam Crenshaw (analyst)

Game information

First quarter

- (11:16) GAST – Liam Rickman 24-yard field goal (Drive: 7 plays, 14 yards, 2:04; Georgia State 3–0)

Second quarter

- (12:28) VAN – Brock Taylor 28-yard field goal (Drive: 14 plays, 64 yards, 6:36; Tied 3–3)
- (7:40) GAST – Ted Hurst 33-yard pass from Christian Veilleux, Liam Rickman kick (Drive: 9 plays, 75 yards, 4:48; Georgia State 10–3)
- (7:39) GAST – 0-yard safety (Georgia State 12–3)
- (0:46) VAN – Junior Sherrill 8-yard pass from Diego Pavia, Brock Taylor kick (Drive: 6 plays, 73 yards, 1:14; Georgia State 12–10)

Third quarter

- (10:22) GAST – Liam Rickman 45-yard field goal (Drive: 11 plays, 48 yards, 4:38; Georgia State 15–10)
- (3:23) GAST – Rykem Laney 12-yard pass from Christian Veilleux, Liam Rickman kick (Drive: 8 plays, 73 yards, 3:20; Georgia State 22–10)

Fourth quarter

- (14:07) VAN – Eli Stowers 18-yard pass from Diego Pavia, Brock Taylor kick (Drive: 6 plays, 37 yards, 3:10; Georgia State 22–17)
- (11:42) GAST – Christian Veilleux 18-yard run, Liam Rickman kick (Drive: 7 plays, 78 yards, 2:21; Georgia State 29–17)
- (2:29) VAN – AJ Newberry 3-yard run, Brock Taylor kick (Drive: 8 plays, 65 yards, 2:25; Georgia State 29–24)
- (1:14) VAN – Sedrick Alexander 1-yard run, AJ Newberry pass (Drive: 3 plays, 39 yards, 0:49; Vanderbilt 32–29)
- (0:15) GAST – Ted Hurst 25-yard pass from Christian Veilleux, Liam Rickman kick (Drive: 7 plays, 75 yards, 0:59; Georgia State 36–32)

Statistics	VAN	GAST
First downs	23	25
Total yards	380	426
Rushing yards	110	157
Passing yards	270	269
Passing: Comp–Att–Int	18–33–0	26–41–1
Time of possession	27:13	32:47

Team	Category	Player	Statistics
Vanderbilt	Passing	Diego Pavia	18/33, 270 yards, 2 TD
Vanderbilt	Rushing	Sedrick Alexander	11 carries, 42 yards, TD
Vanderbilt	Receiving	Eli Stowers	9 receptions, 110 yards, TD
Georgia State	Passing	Christian Veilleux	26/41, 269 yards, 3 TD, INT
Georgia State	Rushing	Freddie Brock	15 carries, 96 yards
Georgia State	Receiving	Ted Hurst	7 receptions, 128 yards, 2 TD

=== Georgia Southern (rivalry) ===
Game Four – Georgia Southern Eagles (2–2) at Georgia State Panthers (2–1) – Game summary

Quarter	1	2	3	4	Total
Eagles	14	10	7	7	38
Panthers	7	0	14	0	21

at Center Parc Stadium • Atlanta, GA

- Date: Saturday September 28, 2024
- Game time: 3:30 PM
- Game weather: Cloudy
- Game attendance: 18,808
- Referee: Ted Pitts
- TV announcers (ESPNU): Clay Matvick (play-by-play) and Steve Addazio (analyst)

Game information

First quarter

- (6:21) GASO – Josh Dallas 1-yard pass from JC French, Gavin Stewart kick (Drive: 11 plays, 61 yards, 5:41; Georgia Southern 7–0)
- (5:34) GAST – Ted Hurst 76-yard pass from Christian Veilleux, Liam Rickman kick (Drive: 2 plays, 75 yards, 0:47; Tied 7–7)
- (2:54) GASO – OJ Arnold 32-yard run, Gavin Stewart kick (Drive: 7 plays, 82 yards, 2:40; Georgia Southern 14–7)

Second quarter

- (13:54) GASO – Gavin Stewart 53-yard field goal (Drive: 10 plays, 45 yards, 2:43; Georgia Southern 17–7)
- (4:39) GASO – OJ Arnold 1-yard run, Gavin Stewart kick (Drive: 12 plays, 98 yards, 5:31; Georgia Southern 24–7)

Third quarter

- (11:40) GAST – Freddie Brock 1-yard run, Liam Rickman kick (Drive: 2 plays, 6 yards, 0:45; Georgia Southern 24–14)
- (9:22) GAST – Dorian Fleming 58-yard pass from Christian Veilleux, Liam Rickman kick (Drive: 3 plays, 73 yards, 1:08; Georgia Southern 24–21)
- (2:33) GASO – Jalen White 8-yard run, Gavin Stewart kick (Drive: 8 plays, 76 yards, 3:18; Georgia Southern 31–21)

Fourth quarter

- (4:10) GASO – Jalen White 16-yard run, Gavin Stewart kick (Drive: 14 plays, 96 yards, 7:27; Georgia Southern 31–21)

Statistics	GASO	GAST
First downs	30	15
Total yards	498	385
Rushing yards	261	29
Passing yards	237	356
Passing: Comp–Att–Int	24–39–0	23–45–3
Time of possession	39:10	20:50

Team	Category	Player	Statistics
Georgia Southern	Passing	JC French	24/39, 237 yards, TD
Georgia Southern	Rushing	Jalen White	22 carries, 114 yards, 2 TD
Georgia Southern	Receiving	Josh Dallas	9 receptions, 89 yards, TD
Georgia State	Passing	Christian Veilleux	23/45, 356 yards, 2 TD, 3 INT
Georgia State	Rushing	Freddie Brock	10 carries, 36 yards, TD
Georgia State	Receiving	Ted Hurst	4 receptions, 112 yards, TD

=== Old Dominion ===
Game Five – Old Dominion Monarchs (1–4) at Georgia State Panthers (2–2) – Game summary

Quarter	1	2	3	4	Total
Monarchs	7	0	7	7	21
Panthers	0	7	0	7	14

at Center Parc Stadium • Atlanta, GA

- Date: Saturday October 12, 2024
- Game time: 3:30 p.m.
- Game weather: Sunny
- Game attendance: 12,280
- Referee: Marshall Lewis
- TV announcers (ESPN+): Matt Stewart (play-by-play) and Sam Crenshaw (analyst)

Game information

First quarter

- (1:17) ODU – Devin Roche 4-yard run, Ethan Sanchez kick (Drive: 9 plays, 78 yards, 4:15; Old Dominion 7–0)

Second quarter

- (10:25) GAST – Ted Hurst 20-yard pass from Christian Veilleux, Liam Rickman kick (Drive: 9 plays, 75 yards, 3:38; Tied 7–7)

Third quarter

- (2:38) ODU – Tariq Sims 6-yard run, Ethan Sanchez kick (Drive: 10 plays, 59 yards, 4:48; Old Dominion 14–7)

Fourth quarter

- (13:08) ODU – Demariyon Houston 9-yard pass from Colton Joseph, Ethan Sanchez kick (Drive: 7 plays, 74 yards, 3:27; Old Dominion 21–7)
- (2:19) GAST – Freddie Brock 24-yard pass from Zach Gibson, Liam Rickman kick (Drive: 6 plays, 54 yards, 1:59; Old Dominion 21–14)

Statistics	ODU	GAST
First downs	18	19
Total yards	343	317
Rushing yards	202	57
Passing yards	141	260
Passing: Comp–Att–Int	14–23–1	28–46–1
Time of possession	32:45	27:15

Team	Category	Player	Statistics
Old Dominion	Passing	Colton Joseph	14/23, 141 yards, TD, INT
Old Dominion	Rushing	Colton Joseph	11 carries, 98 yards
Old Dominion	Receiving	Pat Conroy	7 receptions, 61 yards
Georgia State	Passing	Christian Veilleux	22/40, 211 yards, TD, INT
Georgia State	Rushing	Freddie Brock	12 carries, 40 yards
Georgia State	Receiving	Ted Hurst	6 receptions, 85 yards, TD

=== at Marshall ===
Game Six – Georgia State Panthers (2–3) at Marshall Thundering Herd (3–3) – Game summary

Quarter	1	2	3	4	Total
Panthers	0	10	7	3	20
Thundering Herd	11	14	0	10	35

at Joan C. Edwards Stadium • Huntington, WV

- Date: October 17, 2024
- Game time: 7:00 PM
- Game weather: Sunny
- Game attendance: 20,703
- Referee: Jeremy Parker
- TV announcers (ESPN2): Matt Schumacker (play-by-play) and Dustin Fox (analyst)

Game information

First quarter

- (12:10) MRSH – A. J. Turner 2 yard run, Toby Payne run (Drive: 7 plays, 61 yards, 2:42; Marshall 8–0)
- (3:10) MRSH – Rece Verhoff 47 yard field goal (Drive: 11 plays, 69 yards, 5:46; Marshall 11–0)

Second quarter

- (14:48) MRSH – A. J. Turner 23 yard run, Rece Verhoff kick (Drive: 6 plays, 64 yards, 2:26; Marshall 18–0)
- (11:15) GAST – Liam Rickman 36 yard field goal (Drive: 9 plays, 57 yards, 3:33; Marshall 18–3)
- (3:47) GAST – Michael Dukes 13 yard pass from Zach Gibson, Liam Rickman kick (Drive: 13 plays, 76 yards, 6:30; Marshall 18–10)
- (0:28) MRSH – A. J. Turner 30 yard pass from Braylon Braxton, Rece Verhoff kick (Drive: 11 plays, 75 yards, 3:19; Marshall 25–10)

Third quarter

- (5:51) GAST – Michael Dukes 3 yard pass from Zach Gibson, Liam Rickman kick (Drive: 8 plays, 55 yards, 4:17; Marshall 25–17)

Fourth quarter

- (14:51) GAST – Liam Rickman 20 yard field goal (Drive: 8 plays, 52 yards, 3:33; Marshall 25–20)
- (9:36) MRSH – Rece Verhoff 49 yard field goal (Drive: 6 plays, 22 yards, 2:37; Marshall 28–20)
- (1:39) MRSH – A. J. Turner 88 yard run, Rece Verhoff kick (Drive: 1 play, 88 yards, 0:13; Marshall 35–20)

Statistics	GAST	MRSH
First downs	23	21
Total yards	427	427
Rushing yards	218	295
Passing yards	209	132
Passing: Comp–Att–Int	21–36–0	11–20–1
Time of possession	34:42	25:18

Team	Category	Player	Statistics
Georgia State	Passing	Zach Gibson	19/32, 192 yards, 2 TD
Georgia State	Rushing	Freddie Brock	18 carries, 124 yards
Georgia State	Receiving	Dorian Fleming	7 reception, 66 yards
Marshall	Passing	Braylon Braxton	11/20, 132 yards, TD, INT
Marshall	Rushing	A. J. Turner	15 carries, 177 yards, 3 TD
Marshall	Receiving	Toby Payne	4 receptions, 53 yards

=== at Appalachian State ===
Game Seven – Georgia State Panthers (2–4) at Appalachian State Mountaineers (2–4) – Game summary

Quarter	1	2	3	4	Total
Panthers	0	16	7	3	26
Mountaineers	2	16	7	8	33

at Kidd Brewer Stadium • Boone, NC

- Date: Saturday October 26, 2024
- Game time: 1:00 p.m.
- Game weather: Sunny • Temperature: 67 °F (19 °C) • Wind: SE 5 miles per hour (8.0 km/h)
- Game attendance: 33,783
- Referee: Trennis Livingston
- TV announcers (ESPN+): David Jackson (play-by-play) and Avery Hall (analyst)

Game information

First quarter

- (13:27) APP – 0-yard safety (Appalachian State 2–0)

Second quarter

- (14:56) GAST – Liam Rickman 26-yard field goal (Drive: 10 plays, 77 yards, 5:40; Georgia State 3–2)
- (10:28) APP – Ahmani Marshall 1-yard run (Drive: 8 plays, 75 yards, 4:28; Appalachian State 8–3)
- (6:24) GAST – Ted Hurst 4-yard pass from Zach Gibson, Liam Rickman kick (Drive: 7 plays, 63 yards, 3:57; Georgia State 10–8)
- (3:57) APP – Makai Jackson 18-yard pass from Joey Aguilar, Jackson Moore kick (Drive: 5 plays, 75 yards, 2:27; Appalachian State 15–10)
- (1:15) GAST – Michel Dukes 9-yard run (Drive: 5 plays, 68 yards, 2:36; Appalachian State 16–15)
- (0:06) APP – Jackson Moore 33-yard field goal (Drive: 10 plays, 60 yards, 1:09; Appalachian State 18–16)

Third quarter

- (8:12) APP – Dalton Stroman 23-yard pass from Joey Aguilar, Jackson Moore kick (Drive: 5 plays, 60 yards, 2:02; Appalachian State 25–16)
- (5:05) GAST – Kyle Lowe 5-yard run, Liam Rickman kick (Drive: 6 plays, 75 yards, 3:07; Appalachian State 25–23)

Fourth quarter

- (6:39) GAST – Liam Rickman 38-yard field goal (Drive: 12 plays, 70 yards, 6:47; Georgia State 26–25)
- (1:51) APP – Kanen Hamlett 4-yard pass from Joey Aguilar, Joey Aguilar rush (Drive: 10 plays, 75 yards, 4:48; Appalachian State 33–26)

Statistics	GAST	APP
First downs	20	25
Total yards	386	479
Rushing yards	194	180
Passing yards	192	299
Passing: Comp–Att–Int	16–22–0	18–27–0
Time of possession	30:34	29:26

Team	Category	Player	Statistics
Georgia State	Passing	Zach Gibson	16/22, 192 yards, TD
Georgia State	Rushing	Michel Dukes	6 carries, 81 yards, TD
Georgia State	Receiving	Ted Hurst	3 receptions, 57 yards, TD
Appalachian State	Passing	Joey Aguilar	18/27, 299 yards, 3 TD
Appalachian State	Rushing	Ahmani Marshall	18 carries, 115 yards, TD
Appalachian State	Receiving	Kaedin Robinson	5 receptions, 121 yards

=== at UConn ===
Game Eight – Georgia State Panthers (2–5) at UConn Huskies (5–3) – Game summary

Quarter	1	2	3	4	Total
Panthers	0	10	3	14	27
Huskies	10	3	7	14	34

at Rentschler Field • East Hartford, CT

- Date: Friday November 1, 2024
- Game time: 7:00 p.m.
- Game weather: Clear • Temperature: 66 °F (19 °C) • Wind: NW 9 miles per hour (14 km/h)
- Game attendance: 22,028
- Referee: Nate Black
- TV announcers (CBSSN): Jordan Kent (play-by-play), Logan Ryan (analyst) and Keiana Martin (sideline)

Game information

First quarter

- CONN - Hansen, Louis 2 yd pass from Evers, Nick (Freeman, Chris kick), 12:31. Huskies 7–0. Drive: 3 plays, 59 yards, TOP 01:02
- CONN - Freeman, Chris 42 yd field goal, 3:36. Huskies 10–0. Drive: 12 plays, 59 yards, TOP 04:53

Second quarter

- GAST - Hurst, Ted 7 yd pass from Gibson, Zach (Rickman, Liam kick), 13:36. Huskies 10–7. Drive: 10 plays, 75 yards, TOP 04:55
- GAST - Rickman, Liam 30 yd field goal, 3:29. Tied 10–10. Drive: 11 plays, 33 yards, TOP 05:37
- CONN - Freeman, Chris 28 yd field goal, 0:20. Huskies 13–10. Drive: 5 plays, 16 yards, TOP 00:40

Third quarter

- CONN - Robinson, Durell 1 yd run (Freeman, Chris kick), 12:01. Huskies 20–10. Drive: 6 plays, 75 yards, TOP 02:59
- GAST - Rickman, Liam 20 yd field goal, 4:36. Huskies 20–13. Drive: 16 plays, 72 yards, TOP 07:25

Fourth quarter

- CONN - Evers, Nick 5 yd run (Freeman, Chris kick), 12:54. Huskies 27–13. Drive: 8 plays, 57 yards, TOP 04:01
- CONN - Brown, Mel 31 yd run (Freeman, Chris kick), 11:26. Huskies 34–13. Drive: 1 plays, 31 yards, TOP 00:05
- GAST - Brock, Freddie 55 yd run (Rickman, Liam kick), 9:31. Huskies 34–20. Drive: 4 plays, 64 yards, TOP 01:45
- GAST - Gibson, Zach 2 yd run (Rickman, Liam kick), 1:47. Huskies 34–27. Drive: 12 plays, 93 yards, TOP 02:56

Statistics	GAST	CONN
First downs	21	19
Total yards	374	346
Rushing yards	109	271
Passing yards	265	75
Passing: Comp–Att–Int	30–43–2	10–16–0
Time of possession	32:36	27:24

Team	Category	Player	Statistics
Georgia State	Passing	Zach Gibson	28/40, 257 yards, TD, INT
Georgia State	Rushing	Freddie Brock	10 carries, 78 yards, TD
Georgia State	Receiving	Ted Hurst	7 receptions, 91 yards, TD
UConn	Passing	Nick Evers	10/16, 75 yards, TD
UConn	Rushing	Mel Brown	14 carries, 138 yards, TD
UConn	Receiving	Louis Hansen	5 receptions, 22 yards, TD

=== at James Madison ===
Game Nine – Georgia State Panthers (2–6) at James Madison Dukes (6–2) – Game summary

Quarter	1	2	3	4	Total
Panthers	0	7	0	0	7
Dukes	14	14	10	0	38

at Bridgeforth Stadium • Harrisonburg, VA

- Date: Saturday November 9, 2024
- Game time: 3:30 p.m.
- Game weather: Sunny
- Game attendance: 25,709
- Referee: Steven Robinson
- TV announcers (ESPN+): Curt Dudley (play-by-play), Delvin Joyce (analyst) and David Hulvey (sideline)

Game information

First quarter

- (8:21) JMU – George Pettaway 1-yard run, Noe Ruelas kick (Drive: 9 plays, 68 yards, 4:27; James Madison 7–0)
- (3:19) JMU – Omarion Dollison 52-yard pass from Alonza Barnett III, Noe Ruelas kick (Drive: 1 play, 52 yards, 0:09; James Madison 14–0)

Second quarter

- (14:55) GAST – Ted Hurst 9-yard pass from Zach Gibson, Liam Rickman kick (Drive: 7 plays, 75 yards, 3:24; James Madison 14–7)
- (9:18) JMU – Taylor Thompson 12-yard pass from Alonza Barnett III, Noe Ruelas kick (Drive: 11 plays, 75 yards, 5:37; James Madison 21–7)
- (0:49) JMU – Wayne Knight 7-yard run, Noe Ruelas kick (Drive: 7 plays, 89 yards, 0:51; James Madison 28–7)

Third quarter

- (6:21) JMU – Wayne Knight 18-yard pass from Alonza Barnett III, Noe Ruelas kick (Drive: 6 plays, 54 yards, 2:33; James Madison 35–7)
- (1:24) JMU – Noe Ruelas 38-yard field goal (Drive: 4 plays, 3 yards, 2:16; James Madison 38–7)

Fourth quarter

No scoring plays

Statistics	GAST	JMU
First downs	16	21
Total yards	259	452
Rushing yards	46	211
Passing yards	213	241
Passing: Comp–Att–Int	24–37–0	20–31–0
Time of possession	28:54	31:06

Team	Category	Player	Statistics
Georgia State	Passing	Zach Gibson	24/37, 213 yards, TD
Georgia State	Rushing	Freddie Brock	9 carries, 24 yards
Georgia State	Receiving	Petey Tucker	5 receptions, 54 yards
James Madison	Passing	Alonza Barnett III	20/30, 241 yards, 3 TD
James Madison	Rushing	George Pettaway	13 carries, 95 yards, TD
James Madison	Receiving	Yamir Knight	4 receptions, 65 yards

=== Arkansas State ===
Game Ten – Arkansas State Red Wolves (5–4) at Georgia State Panthers (2–7) – Game summary

Quarter	1	2	3	4	Total
Red Wolves	7	0	10	10	27
Panthers	7	0	7	6	20

at Center Parc Stadium • Atlanta, GA

- Date: Saturday November 16, 2024
- Game time: 5:00 p.m.
- Game weather: Sunny
- Game attendance: 14,047
- Referee: Jeremy Parker
- TV announcers (ESPN+): Matt Stewart (play-by-play) and Sam Crenshaw (analyst)

Game information

First quarter

- (7:17) GAST – Ted Hurst 24-yard pass from Zach Gibson, Liam Rickman kick (Drive: 7 plays, 66 yards, 3:51; Georgia State 7–0)
- (3:34) ARST – Zak Wallace 13-yard run, Clune Van Andel kick (Drive: 7 plays, 75 yards, 3:43; Tied 7–7)

Second quarter

No scoring plays

Third quarter

- (9:32) ARST – Zak Wallace 1-yard run, Clune Van Andel kick (Drive: 6 plays, 54 yards, 2:49; Arkansas State 14–7)
- (2:03) GAST – Michel Dukes 12-yard pass from Christian Veilleux, Liam Rickman kick (Drive: 4 plays, 70 yards, 1:16; Tied 14–14)
- (0:31) ARST – Clune Van Andel 44-yard field goal (Drive: 7 plays, 49 yards, 1:32; Arkansas State 17–14)

Fourth quarter

- (14:03) ARST – Ja'Quez Cross 15-yard run, Clune Van Andel kick (Drive: 2 plays, 23 yards, 0:32; Arkansas State 24–14)
- (11:18) GAST – Braeden McAlister 48-yard field goal (Drive: 7 plays, 45 yards, 2:40; Arkansas State 24–17)
- (7:59) ARST – Clune Van Andel 52-yard field goal (Drive: 6 plays, 41 yards, 3:19; Arkansas State 27–17)
- (5:52) GAST – Liam Rickman 40-yard field goal (Drive: 11 plays, 56 yards, 2:02; Arkansas State 27–20)

Statistics	ARST	GAST
First downs	20	23
Total yards	358	411
Rushing yards	261	65
Passing yards	97	346
Passing: Comp–Att–Int	10–17–0	26–49–2
Time of possession	30:20	29:40

Team	Category	Player	Statistics
Arkansas State	Passing	Jaylen Raynor	10/17, 97 yards
Arkansas State	Rushing	Jaylen Raynor	16 carries, 114 yards
Arkansas State	Receiving	Courtney Jackson	3 receptions, 40 yards
Georgia State	Passing	Christian Veilleux	17/35, 245 yards, TD, INT
Georgia State	Rushing	Michel Dukes	6 carries, 32 yards
Georgia State	Receiving	Ted Hurst	9 receptions, 173 yards, TD

=== at Texas State ===
Game Eleven – Georgia State Panthers (2–8) at Texas State Bobcats (6–4) – Game summary

Quarter	1	2	3	4	Total
Panthers	14	24	7	7	52
Bobcats	14	7	0	23	44

at UFCU Stadium • San Marcos, TX

- Date: Saturday November 23, 2024
- Game time: 7:00 p.m.
- Game weather: Sunny
- Game attendance: 18,271
- Referee: Tim Barker
- TV announcers (ESPN+): Brant Freeman (play-by-play), Keith Moreland (analyst) and Koral Allemand (sideline)

Game information

First quarter

- (11:40) GAST – Michel Dukes 23-yard run, Liam Rickman kick (Drive: 6 plays, 66 yards, 2:06; Georgia State 7–0)
- (7:56) TXST – Torrance Burgess Jr. 18-yard run, Mason Shipley kick (Drive: 9 plays, 75 yards, 3:44; Tied 7–7)
- (5:49) TXST – Chris Dawn Jr. 10-yard pass from Jordan McCloud, Mason Shipley kick (Drive: 2 plays, 16 yards, 0:30; Texas State 14–7)
- (2:39) GAST – Freddie Brock 7-yard run, Liam Rickman kick (Drive: 8 plays, 75 yards, 3:10; Tied 14–14)

Second quarter

- (12:26) TXST – Chris Dawn Jr. 6-yard pass from Jordan McCloud, Mason Shipley kick (Drive: 11 plays, 75 yards, 5:13; Texas State 21–14)
- (8:40) GAST – Dorian Fleming 30-yard pass from Christian Veilleux, Liam Rickman kick (Drive: 8 plays, 75 yards, 3:46; Tied 21–21)
- (1:54) GAST – Dorian Fleming 21-yard pass from Christian Veilleux, Liam Rickman kick (Drive: 7 plays, 80 yards, 3:25; Georgia State 28–21)
- (1:14) GAST – Dorian Fleming 11-yard pass from Christian Veilleux, Liam Rickman kick (Drive: 3 plays, 8 yards, 0:15; Georgia State 35–21)
- (0:00) GAST – Braeden McAlister 52-yard field goal (Drive: 4 plays, 27 yards, 0:19; Georgia State 38–21)

Third quarter

- (1:21) GAST – Freddie Brock 57-yard run, Liam Rickman kick (Drive: 2 plays, 65 yards, 0:49; Georgia State 45–21)

Fourth quarter

- (12:25) TXST – Beau Sparks 80-yard punt return, Chris Dawn Jr. pass (Georgia State 45–29)
- (10:16) GAST – Freddie Brock 16-yard run, Liam Rickman kick (Drive: 4 plays, 61 yards, 2:07; Georgia State 52–29)
- (7:05) TXST – Chris Dawn Jr. 6-yard pass from Jordan McCloud, Mason Shipley kick (Drive: 10 plays, 75 yards, 3:11; Georgia State 52–36)
- (2:52) TXST – Lincoln Pare 3-yard run, Lincoln Pare pass (Drive: 6 plays, 14 yards, 1:05; Georgia State 52–44)

Statistics	GAST	TXST
First downs	27	26
Total yards	504	459
Rushing yards	219	157
Passing yards	285	302
Passing: Comp–Att–Int	15–26–0	28–44–2
Time of possession	31:30	28:30

Team	Category	Player	Statistics
Georgia State	Passing	Christian Veilleux	15/26, 285 yards, 3 TD
Georgia State	Rushing	Freddie Brock	18 carries, 133 yards, 3 TD
Georgia State	Receiving	Dorian Fleming	5 receptions, 88 yards, 3 TD
Texas State	Passing	Jordan McCloud	28/44, 302 yards, 3 TD, 2 INT
Texas State	Rushing	Ismail Mahdi	15 carries, 58 yards
Texas State	Receiving	Jaden Williams	7 receptions, 91 yards

=== Coastal Carolina ===
Game Twelve – Coastal Carolina Chanticleers (5–6) at Georgia State Panthers (3–8) – Game summary

Quarter	1	2	3	4	Total
Chanticleers	7	10	14	17	48
Panthers	0	10	9	8	27

at Center Parc Stadium • Atlanta, GA

- Date: Saturday November 30, 2024
- Game time: 2:00 p.m.
- Game weather: Sunny
- Game attendance: 12,606
- Referee: Marshall Lewis
- TV announcers (ESPN+): Matt Stewart, Sam Crenshaw

Game information

First quarter

- (8:15) CCU – Senika McKie 10-yard pass from Ethan Vasko, Kade Hensley kick (Drive: 6 plays, 25 yards, 3:09; Coastal Carolina 7–0)

Second quarter

- (14:07) GAST – Liam Rickman 28-yard field goal (Drive: 15 plays, 83 yards, 6:27; Coastal Carolina 7–3)
- (8:38) GAST – Freddie Brock 19-yard rush, Liam Rickman kick (Drive: 7 plays, 70 yards, 3:44; Georgia State 10–7)
- (4:16) CCU – Zach Courtney 5-yard pass from Ethan Vasko, Kade Hensley kick (Drive: 9 plays, 75 yards, 4:22; Coastal Carolina 14–10)
- (0:01) CCU – Kade Hensley 43-yard field goal (Drive: 12 plays, 64 yards, 1:39; Coastal Carolina 17–10)

Third quarter

- (10:56) CCU – Christian Washington 18-yard rush, Kade Hensley kick (Drive: 5 plays, 40 yards, 2:28; Coastal Carolina 24–10)
- (7:06) GAST – Liam Rickman 30-yard field goal (Drive: 10 plays, 58 yards, 3:44; Coastal Carolina 24–13)
- (2:44) CCU – Senika McKie 31-yard pass from Ethan Vasko, Kade Hensley kick (Drive: 9 plays, 75 yards, 4:22; Coastal Carolina 31–13)
- (0:25) GAST – Freddie Brock 1-yard rush, Two-point pass conversion attempt failed (Drive: 5 plays, 76 yards, 2:12; Coastal Carolina 31–19)

Fourth quarter

- (9:50) CCU – Ethan Vasko 10-yard rush, Kade Hensley kick (Drive: 10 plays, 78 yards, 5:34; Coastal Carolina 38–19)
- (8:33) CCU – Kade Hensley 23-yard field goal (Drive: 4 plays, 2 yards, 0:49; Coastal Carolina 41–19)
- (7:13) CCU – Tobias Fletcher 29-yard interception returned, Kade Hensley kick (Drive: 0 plays, 0 yards, 0:00; Coastal Carolina 48–19)
- (4:36) GAST – Dorian Fleming 6-yard pass from Kyle Lowe, Kyle Lowe two-point pass conversion to Ted Hurst (Drive: 7 plays, 75 yards, 2:37; Coastal Carolina 48–27)

Statistics	CCU	GAST
First downs	27	19
Total yards	475	428
Rushing yards	275	202
Passing yards	200	226
Passing: Comp–Att–Int	13-20-2	17-32-4
Time of possession	32:43	27:17

Team	Category	Player	Statistics
Coastal Carolina	Passing	Ethan Vasko	13/17, 200 yards, 3 TDs, 1 INT
Coastal Carolina	Rushing	Christian Washington	20 carries, 124 yards, 1 TD
Coastal Carolina	Receiving	Senika McKie	5 receptions, 81 yards, 2 TDs
Georgia State	Passing	Christian Veilleux	15/26, 205 yards, 4 INTs
Georgia State	Rushing	Freddie Brock	14 carries, 71 yards, 2 TDs
Georgia State	Receiving	Ted Hurst	8 receptions, 131 yards

== Roster ==
2024 Georgia State Panthers football team roster
Players
Coaches
Offense

Pos.	#	Name	Class
WR	0	Peter Kikwata	Jr
QB	1	Zach Gibson	RSr
WR	2	Tailique Williams	RSr
RB	3	Sy'veon Wilkerson	Sr
RB	4	C. J. Beasley	RSr
WR	5	Cadarrius Thompson	RSr
WR	6	Rykem Laney	RSr
QB	7	Braylen Ragland	RFr
WR	8	Ja'Cyais Credle	RSr
RB	9	Jordan Ford	Sr
WR	10	D. J. Riles	So
QB	11	Christian Veilleux	Jr
WR	13	Darius Bush	RJr
QB	14	Kyle Lowe	RFr
QB	15	Rodge Waldrop	Fr
WR	16	Ted Hurst	Jr
WR	17	Petey Tucker	Jr
OL	19	Cam Williams	RJr
WR	20	Micah White	Sr
RB	22	Michel Dukes	GS
RB	23	D. J. Murray Jr.	Fr
RB	25	Freddie Brock	RJr
RB	26	Aaron Davis	Fr
RB	28	Phoenix Moss	Fr
TE	35	Avion McBride	RSo
TE	36	Chris Manuel	Jr
WR	42	Ethan Garrett	RJr
OL	51	D'Andre LaVassaur	Fr
OL	52	Donovan Funsch	Fr
OL	53	Malik Jackson	Fr
OL	54	James Puckett	Fr
OL	56	Romello Watson	Sr
OL	60	Dominic Johnson	Fr
OL	63	Trevor Timmons	RSo
OL	67	Ben Chukwuma	RSr
OL	68	Mason Cook	RJr
OL	69	MarQuez Bargman	RJr
OL	70	Alec Johnson	RSo
OL	71	Will Larkins	RFr
OL	72	Joshua Black	RSr
OL	73	Maleek McNeil	RJr
OL	74	Kyrik Mason	RJr
OL	75	Favor Komolafe	RSo
OL	76	Kysean Fenderson-Gentile	Sr
OL	78	Lamar Robinson	Jr
OL	79	Ethan Charles	Fr
WR	80	Avery McFadden	Fr
WR	81	Myles Abernathy	Fr
TE	82	Dorian Fleming	So
WR	83	LaMarcus Brand	RJr
TE	84	Breylen Gilbert	Fr
TE	85	Ahmon Green	RJr
WR	86	Keron Milton	Fr
WR	87	Austin McGee	Fr
TE	88	Lane Wadle	Fr
WR	89	Tarance Breedlove	RJr
WR	89	Amari Powell	Fr

Defense

Pos.	#	Name	Class
ILB	0	Daniel Heimuli	Sr
S	1	Kenyatta Watson II	RSr
ILB	2	Tavian Brown	RSr
CB	3	Gavin Pringle	RSr
S	4	D-Icey Hopkins	RSo
NB	5	Jyron Gilmore	RJr
S	6	Jeremiah Johnson	Sr
CB	7	Izaiah Guy	RSo
DT	8	Dorian Royal	RJr
OLB	9	Kevin Swint	Sr
DT	10	Henry Bryant III	RJr
DT	11	Christian Lorenzo	RSo
CB	12	Sam McCall	Jr
S	13	Isaiah Holland	RSo
S	14	Cam Marshall	So
DT	16	Bishop Thomas	RSo
CB	18	Chams Diagne	RSo
DE	20	Victoine Brown	RJr
S	21	Derrick Maxey III	RFr
S	22	Ja'Maric Morris	Sr
S	23	Jaylen Jones	RFr
CB	24	Ronald Cooper	Sr
ILB	25	Josiah Robinson	So
NB	26	Deuce Walker	Fr
CB	28	Marlon McClendon	RFr
CB	29	Dorian Gibson	So
ILB	30	Joseph Jean	Fr
CB	31	Remez Lockhart	RJr
S	32	Cody Jones	RJr
ILB	33	Xavier Robinson	Sr
CB	34	Devin Prince	RFr
S	35	Dyllon Houghton	RFr
ILB	36	Brent Washington	Fr
CB	37	Gary Turner	Jr
CB	38	Cameron Prather	Fr
OLB	39	LaQuavius Bailey	Fr
DT	40	Sir Mells	RSo
ILB	41	Jayven Hall	RFr
CB	42	Tylan Smith	Fr
DE	43	Chris Davis Jr.	RJr
ILB	44	Jacobi Jones	Fr
ILB	45	Damaine Wilson	Fr
DE	46	Ian Mathews	RJr
OLB	47	K. D. McDaniel	RSr
ILB	48	Justin Abraham	Sr
ILB	49	Gavin Bloom	RSo
DT	50	Adrian Hill	Fr
DT	52	Anthony Blume	RSr
DE	53	Jude Tinor	RFr
OLB	54	Kiersten Lee	RSr
ILB	55	Antonio Wesley	Fr
DT	56	Fuches Lewis II	RJr
DE	93	Deity Deablo	Fr
DT	99	Jalen Jordan	RJr

Special teams

Pos.	#	Name	Class
PK	15	Braeden McAlister	RSo
LS	27	Sam Lindsey	RFr
LS	47	Michael Fitzmeyer	RSo
PK	92	Liam Rickman	RSo
PK, P	94	Kade Loggins	RJr
LS	97	Spencer Radnoti	Fr
P	98	James Allen	RJr

Head coach

- Dell McGee

Coordinators/assistant coaches

- Jim Chaney – Offensive coordinator
- Kevin Sherrer – Defensive coordinator, linebackers
- Will Healy – Assistant Head coach, running backs
- Dameyune Craig – Assistant coach, wide receivers
- John Adams – Assistant coach, nickels
- Antreal Allen – Assistant coach, cornerbacks
- Jeremy Hawkins – Assistant coach, defensive line
- Manrey Saint-Amour – Assistant coach, offensive line
- Ryan Williams – Assistant coach, quarterbacks
- Jeremiah Wilson – Assistant coach, safeties
- Carter Blount – Associate head coach, special teams, director of quality control
- K. J. Florence – Head strength coach
- Jim Durning – Assistant football strength coach
- Tanner Hawthorne – Assistant football strength coach

Legend

- (C) Team captain
- (S) Suspended
- (I) Ineligible
- Injured
- Redshirt

Roster
Last update: 13 November 2024
