= 2024 Appalachian State Mountaineers football team =

American college football season

2024 Appalachian State Mountaineers football
- Conference: Sun Belt Conference
- East Division
- Record: 5–6 (3–5 Sun Belt)
- Head coach: Shawn Clark (5th season)
- Offensive coordinator: Frank Ponce (3rd season)
- Offensive scheme: Pro tempo
- Defensive coordinator: Scot Sloan (2nd season)
- Base defense: 3–4
- Home stadium: Kidd Brewer Stadium

2024 Sun Belt Conference football standings
	Conf.			Overall
Team	W		L	W		L
East Division
Marshall xy$	7	–	1	10	–	3
Georgia Southern	6	–	2	8	–	5
James Madison	4	–	4	9	–	4
Old Dominion	4	–	4	5	–	7
Coastal Carolina	3	–	5	6	–	7
Appalachian State	3	–	5	5	–	6
Georgia State	1	–	7	3	–	9
West Division
Louisiana xy	7	–	1	10	–	4
Texas State	5	–	3	8	–	5
Arkansas State	5	–	3	8	–	5
South Alabama	5	–	3	7	–	6
Louisiana–Monroe	3	–	5	5	–	7
Troy	3	–	5	4	–	8
Southern Miss	0	–	8	1	–	11
Championship: Marshall 31, Louisiana 3
$ – Conference champion; x – Division champion/co-champions; y – Championship game participant

The 2024 Appalachian State Mountaineers football team represented Appalachian State University in the Sun Belt Conference's East Division during the 2024 NCAA Division I FBS football season. The Mountaineers were led by Shawn Clark in his fifth year as the head coach. The Mountaineers played their home games at the Kidd Brewer Stadium, located in Boone, North Carolina.

Shawn Clark was fired as the Mountaineers' head coach on December 2, finishing his career at Appalachian State with an overall record of 40–24. This was the Mountaineers' first losing season since 2013, and the program's first losing season at the FBS level. On December 7, South Carolina offensive coordinator Dowell Loggains was hired as the Mountaineers' new head coach.

== Preseason ==
=== Media poll ===
In the Sun Belt preseason coaches' poll, the Mountaineers were picked to finish first place in the East division.

Quarterback Joey Aguilar was named the Preseason Offensive Player of the Year. Aguilar, was well as tight end Eli Wilson and wide receiver Kaedin Robinson, were awarded to be in the preseason All-Sun Belt first team offense. Defensive lineman Santana Hopper, linebacker Nate Johnson, and defensive backs Jordan Favors and Ethan Johnson made the All-Sun Belt first team defense.

Running back Kanye Roberts and placekicker Michael Hughes were named to the second team offense and special teams, respectively.

== Schedule ==
The football schedule was announced on March 1, 2024.

Date	Time	Opponent	Site	TV	Result	Attendance
August 31	3:30 p.m.	East Tennessee State*	Kidd Brewer Stadium; Boone, NC	ESPN+	W 38–10	36,232
September 7	8:00 p.m.	at No. 25 Clemson*	Memorial Stadium; Clemson, SC	ACCN	L 20–66	81,500
September 14	4:00 p.m	at East Carolina*	Dowdy–Ficklen Stadium; Greenville, NC	ESPNU	W 21–19	46,117
September 19	7:30 p.m.	South Alabama	Kidd Brewer Stadium; Boone, NC	ESPN	L 14–48	34,133
September 28	3:30 p.m.	Liberty*	Kidd Brewer Stadium; Boone, NC	ESPN+	Canceled	
October 5	3:30 p.m.	at Marshall	Joan C. Edwards Stadium; Huntington, WV (rivalry)	ESPN+	L 37–52	28,023
October 12	7:30 p.m.	at Louisiana	Cajun Field; Lafayette, LA	ESPN+	L 24–34	14,058
October 26	1:00 p.m.	Georgia State	Kidd Brewer Stadium; Boone, NC	ESPN+	W 33–26	33,783
November 2	2:30 p.m.	Old Dominion	Kidd Brewer Stadium; Boone, NC	ESPN+	W 28–20	34,954
November 7	8:00 p.m.	at Coastal Carolina	Brooks Stadium; Conway, SC	ESPN	L 24–38	19,415
November 23	2:30 p.m.	James Madison^{†}	Kidd Brewer Stadium; Boone, NC	ESPN+	W 34–20	34,012
November 30	6:00 p.m.	at Georgia Southern	Paulson Stadium; Statesboro, GA (rivalry)	ESPN+	L 20–29	23,383
*Non-conference game; ^{†}Homecoming; Rankings from AP Poll and CFP Rankings released prior to game; All times are in Eastern time

== Personnel ==
2024 Appalachian State Mountaineers football team roster
Players
Coaches
Offense

Pos.	#	Name	Class
WR	0	William Fowles	Fr
RB	1	Anderson Castle	Jr
WR	2	Kaedin Robinson	Sr
RB	3	Ahmani Marshall	Sr
QB	4	Joey Aguilar	Sr
QB	6	Matthew Wilson	Fr
WR	8	Dalton Stroman	Jr
QB	9	Billy Wiles	Jr
WR	10	Zahn Coakley	Fr
WR	11	Grant Tucker	Fr
WR	12	Michael Hetzel	Jr
WR	13	Christian Horn	Sr
RB	14	Kanye Roberts	So
WR	15	Makai Jackson	Jr
QB	16	David Hernandez	Sr
WR	18	Zavier Short	So
QB	19	Cameron Estep	Fr
RB	20	Jaylon Calhoun	Fr
WR	21	Reece Larson	So
WR	22	Franklin Baret Jr.	Fr
WR	25	Blake Hoban	Jr
RB	26	Khamani Alexander	Fr
RB	27	Michael Dipasquale	Fr
RB	28	Maquel Haywood	Sr
TE	46	Jared Gibble	Jr
OL	52	Cayden Sweatt	Fr
OL	53	Jake Ganoe	So
OL	58	Blake Bradford	Fr
OL	60	Ethan Ryan	Jr
OL	62	JT Sowell	Fr
OL	63	Jayden Ramsey	Jr
OL	64	Michael Marotta	Jr
OL	65	Gabe Funk	Fr
OL	66	Danny Stevens	Fr
OL	67	Thomas Shrader	Jr
OL	68	Jack Hollifield	Jr
OL	70	Thornton Gentry	Jr
OL	72	Markell Samuel	Jr
OL	73	Garner Langlo	Jr
OL	74	Griffin Scroggs	So
OL	75	Felix Doege	Fr
OL	76	Luke Burgess	Fr
OL	77	Daniel Davis	Fr
OL	78	Dylan Barbrey	Fr
OL	79	Andres Dewerk	Jr
TE	80	Max Drag	Fr
WR	81	Jose Leon	Fr
WR	82	Chris Lawson Jr.	Fr
TE	83	Jack Kelly	Fr
WR	84	Ayden Burkey	Fr
TE	85	David Larkins	Jr
TE	86	Kanen Hamlett	So
TE	87	Eli Wilson	Sr
WR	88	Luke Hale	So
WR	89	Bryce Gee	Fr

Defense

Pos.	#	Name	Class
CB	0	Trenton Alan Yowe	Jr
CB	2	Ethan Johnson	Jr
S	4	Myles Farmer	Sr
DE	5	Michael Fletcher	Sr
CB	6	Jason Chambers	Jr
S	7	Jordan Favors	Jr
ILB	8	Brendan Harrington	Sr
NT	9	Markus Clark	Jr
S	10	Colton Phares	Fr
STAR	11	Avarion Cole	Jr
DE	12	Shawn Collins	Jr
CB	13	Elijah Mc-Cantos	So
ILB	14	Jayden Bethea	Fr
OLB	15	Thomas Davis	Jr
CB	16	Seth Robertson	Sr
STAR	17	Jalik Thomas	Sr
S	18	Trey Lenhardt	Fr
CB	19	Nick Taylor	Fr
S	20	Kaleb Neal	Fr
S	21	DJ Burks	So
CB	22	DaRon Wilson	Fr
ILB	24	Cahari Haynes	Fr
STAR	25	Kai Fernandes	Fr
ILB	26	Caden Sullivan	Jr
S	27	Ronald Clarke	Sr
S	28	Zyeir Gamble	Fr
DE	29	Santana Hopper	So
S	30	Carter Greene	So
S	31	Dyvon McKinney	Jr
ILB	33	Derrell Farrar	So
ILB	35	Jack Scroggs	Sr
CB	36	Tyshawn Sanders	Fr
STAR	37	Andre Hamilton	Jr
CB	39	Ashton Parker	Fr
ILB	40	Cole Becker	So
ILB	42	Braxton Veiga	Fr
ILB	43	Ryan McKinnis	Fr
OLB	44	Brodrick Gooch	So
NT	45	Nick Campbell	So
ILB	46	Isaiah McGuffin	Fr
CB	48	Luke Lair	So
ILB	49	Randy Marion III	Fr
DE	50	Jackson Briley	Fr
OLB	51	Anthony Rosier	Fr
OLB	52	Orlando Leon	So
DE	55	Jackson Bussey	Fr
ILB	56	Kyle Arnholt	Jr
OLB	90	Nate Johnson	So
NT	91	Joshua Donald	Jr
OLB	92	AJ Mebane	Fr
DE	93	DeNigel Cooper	Fr
NT	94	Bucci Farmer	Fr
DE	95	Montez Kelley	Sr
DE	96	Josiah Wyatt	So
DE	97	Kevin Abrams-Verwayne	Sr
NT	98	Jason Hertz	Fr

Special teams

Pos.	#	Name	Class
K	29	Carter Everett	So
K	39	Jackson Moore	Fr
P	41	Conner Maynard	Sr
LS	42	Christian Johnstone	Sr
K	43	Cash McVay	Jr
P	49	Mitchell Lake	So
LS	54	Gabriel Simpkins	So
K	99	Michael Hughes	Sr

Head coach

- Shawn Clark (Appalachian State)

Coordinators/assistant coaches

- Frank Ponce (Arizona Western)
  Offensive coordinator/QB
- Scot Sloan (Clemson)
  Defensive coordinator/Safeties
- Mike Cummings (Buffalo)
  Offensive Line
- Travis Cunningham (Gardner–Webb)
  Inside linebackers
- Lawrence Dawsey (Florida State)
  Wide receivers
- Brian Haines (Marietta College)
  Special teams coordinator/RB
- AJ Howard (Appalachian State)
  Outside linebackers/Stars
- Eric McDaniel (Purdue)
  Defensive Line
- Lance Ware (Appalachian State)
  Tight ends
- Rod West (Alabama State)
  Defensive passing game coordinator/cornerbacks
- Matt Greenhalgh (Rhode Island)
  Director of athletic performance for football

Legend

- (C) Team captain
- (S) Suspended
- (I) Ineligible
- Injured
- Redshirt

Roster
Last update: November 13, 2024

== Game summaries ==
=== East Tennessee State (FCS) ===
Game One – East Tennessee State Buccaneers (FCS) (0–0) at Appalachian State Mountaineers (0–0)

Quarter	1	2	3	4	Total
Buccaneers (FCS)	0	7	3	0	10
Mountaineers	10	7	7	14	38

at Kidd Brewer Stadium, Boone, NC

- Date: August 31, 2024
- Game time: 3:30 p.m. EDT
- Game weather: Cloudy • Temperature: 78 °F (26 °C) • Wind: N 4 mph
- Game attendance: 36,232
- Referee: Tim Barker
- TV announcers (ESPN+): David Jackson (play-by-play) and Avery Hall (analyst)

Game information

First Quarter

- (12:18) APP – Christian Horn 83-yard pass from Joey Aguilar, Michael Hughes kick (Drive: 2 plays, 85 yards, 0:44; Appalachian State 7–0)
- (4:03) APP – Michael Hughes 32-yard field goal (Drive: 11 plays, 42 yards, 4:24; Appalachian State 10–0)

Second Quarter

- (7:38) APP – Joey Aguilar 1-yard run, Michael Hughes kick (Drive: 13 plays, 80 yards, 7:13; Appalachian State 17–0)
- (1:49) ETSU – Devontae Houston 80-yard run, Ewan Johnson kick (Drive: 2 plays, 85 yards, 0:46; Appalachian State 17–7)

Third Quarter

- (5:49) ETSU – Ewan Johnson 25-yard field goal (Drive: 9 plays, 58 yards, 5:05; Appalachian State 17–10)
- (3:14) APP – Eli Wilson 34-yard pass from Joey Aguilar, Michael Hughes kick (Drive: 9 plays, 75 yards, 2:35; Appalachian State 24–10)

Fourth Quarter

- (14:48) APP – Makai Jackson 47-yard run, Michael Hughes kick (Drive: 2 plays, 54 yards, 0:52; Appalachian State 31–10)
- (8:39) APP – Joey Aguilar 1-yard run, Michael Hughes kick (Drive: 7 plays, 68 yards, 3:14; Appalachian State 38–10)

Win Probability

Line

Over/Under

Statistics	ETSU	APP
First downs	15	22
Total yards	305	500
Rushing yards	183	174
Passing yards	122	326
Passing: Comp–Att–Int	11–20–0	22–36–0
Time of possession	30:30	28:25

Team	Category	Player	Statistics
East Tennessee State	Passing	Jaylen King	10/19, 122 yards
East Tennessee State	Rushing	Devontae Houston	15 carries, 126 yards, TD
East Tennessee State	Receiving	Cameron Lewis	3 receptions, 47 yards
Appalachian State	Passing	Joey Aguilar	22/36, 326 yards, 2 TD
Appalachian State	Rushing	Makai Jackson	1 carry, 47 yards, TD
Appalachian State	Receiving	Kaedin Robinson	8 receptions, 103 yards

=== at No. 25 Clemson ===
Game Two – Appalachian State Mountaineers (1–0) vs. No. 25 Clemson Tigers (0–1) − Game summary

Quarter	1	2	3	4	Total
Mountaineers	0	13	7	0	20
No. 25 Tigers	35	21	10	0	66

at Memorial Stadium • Clemson, SC

- Date: September 7, 2024
- Game time: 8:00 p.m.
- Game weather: Temperature: 74 °F (23 °C) • Wind: NE 8 mph • Weather: Cloudy
- Game attendance: 81,500
- Referee: Stuart Mullins
- TV announcers (ACCN): Wes Durham (play-by-play), Tom Luginbill (analyst), and Dawn Boyle (sideline reporter)

Game information

First quarter

- (13:46) CLEM – Bryant Wesco Jr. 76-yard pass from Cade Klubnik, Nolan Hauser kick (Drive: 3 plays, 75 yards, 1:14; Clemson 7–0)
- (9:40) CLEM – Cade Klubnik 2-yard run, Nolan Hauser kick (Drive: 6 plays, 84 yards, 2:16; Clemson 14–0)
- (7:08) CLEM – Phil Mafah 83-yard run, Nolan Hauser kick (Drive: 3 plays, 92 yards, 1:10; Clemson 21–0)
- (2:34) CLEM – Jake Briningstool 41-yard pass from Cade Klubnik, Nolan Hauser kick (Drive: 5 plays, 69 yards, 1:51; Clemson 28–0)
- (1:11) CLEM – Antonio Williams 29-yard pass from Cade Klubnik, Nolan Hauser kick (Drive: 1 play, 44 yards, 0:12; Clemson 35–0)

Second quarter

- (12:58) CLEM – Cade Klubnik 3-yard run, Nolan Hauser kick (Drive: 5 plays, 30 yards, 2:02; Clemson 42–0)
- (10:39) APP – Anderson Castle 4-yard run, Michael Hughes kick (Drive: 7 plays, 63 yards, 2:14; Clemson 42–7)
- (6:48) CLEM – T. J. Moore 33-yard pass from Cade Klubnik, Nolan Hauser kick (Drive: 9 plays, 71 yards, 3:47; Clemson 49–7)
- (3:28) APP – Michael Hughes 36-yard field goal (Drive: 6 plays, 12 yards, 1:49; Clemson 49–10)
- (0:54) CLEM – Jake Briningstool 17-yard pass from Cade Klubnik, Nolan Hauser kick (Drive: 9 plays, 75 yards, 2:34; Clemson 56–10)
- (0:00) APP – Michael Hughes 35-yard field goal (Drive: 7 plays, 58 yards, 0:54; Clemson 56–13)

Third quarter

- (12:31) APP – Makai Jackson 17-yard pass from Joey Aguilar, Michael Hughes kick (Drive: 6 plays, 75 yards, 2:29; Clemson 56–20)
- (3:10) CLEM – Christopher Vizzina 5-yard run, Nolan Hauser kick (Drive: 7 plays, 61 yards, 3:15; Clemson 63–20)
- (1:51) CLEM – Nolan Hauser 36-yard field goal (Drive: 4 plays, 1 yard, 1:14; Clemson 66–20)

Fourth quarter

No scoring

Statistics	APP	CLEM
First downs	24	28
Total yards	363	712
Rushing yards	149	252
Passing yards	214	460
Passing: Comp–Att–Int	18–43–2	32–39–0
Time of possession	28:27	31:33

Team	Category	Player	Statistics
Appalachian State	Passing	Joey Aguilar	18/41, 214 yards, TD
Appalachian State	Rushing	Anderson Castle	7 carries, 80 yards, TD
Appalachian State	Receiving	Kaedin Robinson	3 receptions, 58 yards
Clemson	Passing	Cade Klubnik	24/46, 378 yards, 5 TD
Clemson	Rushing	Phil Mafah	10 carries, 118 yards, TD
Clemson	Receiving	Bryant Wesco Jr.	3 receptions, 130 yards, TD

=== at East Carolina ===
Game Three – Appalachian State Mountaineers (1–1) at East Carolina Pirates (2–0) – Game summary

Quarter	1	2	3	4	Total
Mountaineers	0	14	7	0	21
Pirates	16	0	0	3	19

at Dowdy–Ficklen Stadium • Greenville, North Carolina

- Date: September 14, 2024
- Game time: 4:00 p.m. EDT
- Game weather: Sunny • Temperature: 77 °F (25 °C) • Wind: NE at 15 miles per hour (24 km/h)
- Game attendance: 46,117
- Referee: Kevin Randall
- TV announcers (ESPNU): Mike Corey (play-by-play) and Rene Ingoglia (analyst)

Game information

First quarter

- (14:29) ECU – Winston Wright Jr. 65 yard pass from Jake Garcia, Andrew Conrad kick (Drive: 3 plays, 75 yards, 0:31; East Carolina 7–0)
- (6:33) ECU – Andrew Conrad 48 yard field goal (Drive: 12 plays, 50 yards, 5:15; East Carolina 10–0)
- (4:55) ECU – Shavon Revel Jr. 50 yard interception return, kick failed (East Carolina 16–0)

Second quarter

- (14:17) APP – Eli Wilson 6 yard pass from Joey Aguilar, 2-point pass (Drive: 13 plays, 75 yards, 5:38; East Carolina 16–8)
- (7:00) APP – Michael Hughes 28 yard field goal (Drive: 10 plays, 71 yards, 5:52; East Carolina 16–11)
- (0:09) APP – Michael Hughes 35 yard field goal (Drive: 7 plays, 55 yards, 0:55; East Carolina 16–14)

Third quarter

- (0:41) APP – Makai Jackson 36 yard pass from Joey Aguilar, Michael Hughes kick (Drive: 4 plays, 56 yards, 1:24; Appalachian State 21–16)

Fourth quarter

- (12:39) ECU – Andrew Conrad 43 yard field goal (Drive: 12 plays, 50 yards, 3:10; Appalachian State 21–19)

Statistics	APP	ECU
First downs	25	16
Total yards	505	324
Rushing yards	81	98
Passing yards	424	226
Passing: Comp–Att–Int	32–47–2	18–28–1
Time of possession	39:00	21:00

Team	Category	Player	Statistics
Appalachian State	Passing	Joey Aguilar	32/47, 424 yards, 2 TD, 2 INT
Appalachian State	Rushing	Anderson Castle	17 carries, 40 yards
Appalachian State	Receiving	Kaedin Robinson	7 receptions, 129 yards
East Carolina	Passing	Jake Garcia	18/28, 226 yards, 1 TD, 1 INT
East Carolina	Rushing	Rahjai Harris	18 carries, 87 yards
East Carolina	Receiving	Winston Wright Jr.	3 receptions, 72 yards, 1 TD

=== South Alabama ===
Game Four – South Alabama Jaguars (1–2) at Appalachian State Mountaineers (2–1)

Quarter	1	2	3	4	Total
Jaguars	14	14	13	7	48
Mountaineers	0	7	0	7	14

at Kidd Brewer Stadium, Boone, NC

- Date: September 19, 2024
- Game time: 7:30 p.m. EDT
- Game weather: Sunny • Temperature: 66 °F (19 °C) • Wind: N 3 mph
- Game attendance: 34,133
- Referee: Marshall Lewis
- TV announcers (ESPN): Matt Barrie (play-by-play), Dan Mullen (analyst) and Harry Lyles Jr. (sideline)

Game information

First Quarter

- (11:59) USA – DJ Thomas-Jones 10-yard pass from Gio Lopez, Laith Marjan kick (Drive: 6 plays, 75 yards, 3:01; South Alabama 7–0)
- (7:10) USA – Fluff Bothwell 22-yard run, Laith Marjan kick (Drive: 6 plays, 60 yards, 2:06; South Alabama 14–0)

Second Quarter

- (5:30) USA – Gio Lopez 31-yard run, Laith Marjan kick (Drive: 13 plays, 95 yards, 7:49; South Alabama 21–0)
- (2:30) USA – Kentrel Bullock 2-yard run, Laith Marjan kick (Drive: 2 plays, 2 yards, 0:12; South Alabama 28–0)
- (0:00) APP – Dalton Stroman 47-yard pass from Joey Aguilar, Michael Hughes kick (Drive: 6 plays, 75 yards, 0:53; South Alabama 28–7)

Third Quarter

- (11:08) USA – Jamaal Pritchett 18-yard pass from Gio Lopez, Laith Marjan kick failed (Drive: 3 plays, 47 yards, 1:31; South Alabama 34–7)
- (5:35) USA – Fluff Bothwell 14-yard run, Laith Marjan kick (Drive: 6 plays, 67 yards, 3:04; South Alabama 41–7)

Fourth Quarter

- (4:15) USA – Iverson Celestine 6-yard run, Hamilton DiBoyan kick (Drive: 9 plays, 55 yards, 6:00; South Alabama 48–7)
- (0:52) APP – Maquel Haywood 2-yard run, Michael Hughes kick (Drive: 12 plays, 75 yards, 3:16; South Alabama 48–14)

Statistics	USA	APP
First downs	26	23
Total yards	474	385
Rushing yards	320	119
Passing yards	154	266
Passing: Comp–Att–Int	16–24–1	21–40–0
Time of possession	34:12	25:48

Team	Category	Player	Statistics
South Alabama	Passing	Gio Lopez	16/24, 154 yards, 2 TD
South Alabama	Rushing	Fluff Bothwell	14 carries, 116 yards, 2 TD
South Alabama	Receiving	Jamaal Pritchett	6 receptions, 68 yards, TD
Appalachian State	Passing	Joey Aguilar	21/40, 266 yards, TD, INT
Appalachian State	Rushing	Maquel Haywood	7 carries, 47 yards, TD
Appalachian State	Receiving	Kaedin Robinson	6 receptions, 85 yards

=== Liberty ===
Game Five – Liberty Flames (4–0) at Appalachian State Mountaineers (2–2)

Quarter	1	2	3	4	Total
Flames	-	-	-	-	0
Mountaineers	-	-	-	-	0

at Kidd Brewer Stadium, Boone, North Carolina

- Date: September 28, 2024 (canceled)
- Game time: Canceled, due to Hurricane Helene

=== at Marshall (rivalry) ===
Game Five – Appalachian State Mountaineers (2–2) at Marshall Thundering Herd (2–2) – Game summary

Quarter	1	2	3	4	Total
Mountaineers	3	14	7	13	37
Thundering Herd	7	21	10	14	52

at Joan C. Edwards Stadium • Huntington, WV

- Date: October 5, 2024
- Game time: 3:30 p.m.
- Game weather: Sunny • Temperature: 77 °F (25 °C)
- Game attendance: 28,023
- Referee: Tim Barker
- TV announcers (ESPN+): Mark Martin (play-by-play) and Keith Morehouse (analyst)

Game information

First quarter

- (11:56) MRSH – Braylon Braxton 3 yard run, Rece Verhoff kick (Drive: 4 plays, 48 yards, 1:45; Marshall 7–0)
- (7:51) APP – Jackson Moore 42 yard field goal (Drive: 10 plays, 51 yards, 4:05; Marshall 7–3)

Second quarter

- (14:55) APP – Kanye Roberts 10 yard run, Jackson Moore kick (Drive: 14 plays, 94 yards, 6:26; Appalachian State 10–7)
- (14:05) MRSH – Jordan Houston 75 yard pass from Braylon Braxton, Rece Verhoff kick (Drive: 2 plays, 76 yards, 0:46; Marshall 14–10)
- (13:53) MRSH – J'Coryan Anderson 13 yard interception return, Rece Verhoff kick (Marshall 21–10)
- (4:58) MRSH – A. J. Turner 5 yard pass from Braylon Braxton, Rece Verhoff kick (Drive: 9 plays, 79 yards, 3:06; Marshall 28–10)
- (0:47) APP – Dalton Stroman 21 yard pass from Joey Aguilar, Jackson Moore kick (Drive: 9 plays, 75 yards, 4:11; Marshall 28–17)

Third quarter

- (7:01) MRSH – A. J. Turner 29 yard run, Rece Verhoff kick (Drive: 8 plays, 80 yards, 3:56; Marshall 35–17)
- (5:06) MRSH – Rece Verhoff 38 yard field goal (Drive: 4 plays, 8 yards, 1:49; Marshall 38–17)
- (1:50) APP – Dalton Stroman 27 yard pass from Joey Aguilar, Jackson Moore kick (Drive: 8 plays, 75 yards, 3:16; Marshall 38–24)

Fourth quarter

- (11:12) MRSH – Chuck Montgomery 26 yard pass from Braylon Braxton, Rece Verhoff kick (Drive: 10 plays, 65 yards, 5:33; Marshall 45–24)
- (6:05) APP – Ahmani Marshall 2 yard run, Jackson Moore kick (Drive: 14 plays, 75 yards, 5:07; Marshall 45–31)
- (4:16) MRSH – Braylon Braxton 35 yard run, Rece Verhoff kick (Drive: 6 plays, 58 yards, 1:49; Marshall 52–31)
- (1:13) APP – Ahmani Marshall 2 yard run, Joey Aguilar pass failed (Drive: 10 plays, 75 yards, 3:03; Marshall 52–37)

Statistics	APP	MRSH
First downs	32	21
Total yards	473	365
Rushing yards	180	236
Passing yards	293	129
Passing: Comp–Att–Int	26–44–2	8–14–0
Time of possession	35:34	24:26

Team	Category	Player	Statistics
Appalachian State	Passing	Joey Aguilar	26/44, 293 yards, 2 TD, 2 INT
Appalachian State	Rushing	Joey Aguilar	10 carries, 55 yards
Appalachian State	Receiving	Kaedin Robinson	8 receptions, 94 yardds
Marshall	Passing	Braylon Braxton	8/14, 129 yards, 3 TD
Marshall	Rushing	Braylon Braxton	15 carries, 140 yards, 2 TD
Marshall	Receiving	Jordan Houston	1 reception, 75 yards, 1 TD

=== at Louisiana ===
Game Seven – Appalachian State Mountaineers (2–3) at Louisiana Ragin' Cajuns (4–1) – Game summary

Quarter	1	2	3	4	Total
Mountaineers	0	14	3	7	24
Ragin' Cajuns	3	14	3	14	34

at Cajun Field • Lafayette, LA

- Date: Saturday October 12, 2024
- Game time: 7:30 p.m.
- Game weather: Sunny
- Game attendance: 14,058
- Referee: Steven Robinson
- TV: ESPN+

Game information

First quarter

- (8:03) LA – Kenneth Almendares 32-yard field goal (Drive: 12 plays, 75 yards, 4:56; Louisiana 3–0)

Second quarter

- (10:29) APP – David Larkins 1-yard pass from Joey Aguilar, Jackson Moore kick (Drive: 13 plays, 77 yards, 6:48; Appalachian State 7–3)
- (10:10) LA – Terrance Carter 74-yard pass from Ben Wooldridge, Kenneth Almendares kick (Drive: 1 play, 74 yards, 0:13; Louisiana 10–7)
- (1:55) LA – Harvey Broussard 8-yard pass from Ben Wooldridge, Kenneth Almendares kick (Drive: 5 plays, 33 yards, 3:14; Louisiana 17–7)
- (0:27) APP – Kanye Roberts 15-yard pass from Joey Aguilar, Jackson Moore kick (Drive: 10 plays, 70 yards, 1:28; Louisiana 17–14)

Third quarter

- (8:19) APP – Jackson Moore 44-yard field goal (Drive: 11 plays, 44 yards, 4:46; Tied 17–17)
- (3:10) LA – Kenneth Almendares 53-yard field goal (Drive: 11 plays, 41 yards, 5:04; Louisiana 20–17)

Fourth quarter

- (13:11) LA – Landon Burton 0-yard run, Kenneth Almendares kick (Drive: 1 play, 7 yards, 0:08; Louisiana 27–17)
- (8:06) APP – Eli Wilson 26-yard pass from Joey Aguilar, Jackson Moore kick (Drive: 7 plays, 67 yards, 2:38; Louisiana 27–24)
- (1:03) LA – Ben Wooldridge 1-yard run, Kenneth Almendares kick (Drive: 7 plays, 32 yards, 2:44; Louisiana 34–24)

Statistics	APP	LA
First downs	25	19
Total yards	391	364
Rushing yards	155	166
Passing yards	236	198
Passing: Comp–Att–Int	20–42–4	14–23–1
Time of possession	30:40	29:20

Team	Category	Player	Statistics
Appalachian State	Passing	Joey Aguilar	20/42, 236 yards, 3 TD, 4 INT
Appalachian State	Rushing	Kanye Roberts	26 carries, 148 yards
Appalachian State	Receiving	Kaedin Robinson	7 receptions, 96 yards
Louisiana	Passing	Ben Wooldridge	14/23, 198 yards, 2 TD, INT
Louisiana	Rushing	Zylan Perry	14 carries, 53 yards
Louisiana	Receiving	Terrance Carter	4 receptions, 107 yards, TD

=== Georgia State ===
Game Eight – Georgia State Panthers (2–4) at Appalachian State Mountaineers (2–4) – Game summary

Quarter	1	2	3	4	Total
Panthers	0	16	7	3	26
Mountaineers	2	16	7	8	33

at Kidd Brewer Stadium • Boone, NC

- Date: Saturday October 26, 2024
- Game time: 1:00 p.m.
- Game weather: Sunny • Temperature: 67 °F (19 °C) • Wind: SE 5 miles per hour (8.0 km/h)
- Game attendance: 33,783
- Referee: Trennis Livingston
- TV announcers (ESPN+): David Jackson (play-by-play) and Avery Hall (analyst)

Game information

First quarter

- (13:27) APP – 0-yard safety (Appalachian State 2–0)

Second quarter

- (14:56) GAST – Liam Rickman 26-yard field goal (Drive: 10 plays, 77 yards, 5:40; Georgia State 3–2)
- (10:28) APP – Ahmani Marshall 1-yard run (Drive: 8 plays, 75 yards, 4:28; Appalachian State 8–3)
- (6:24) GAST – Ted Hurst 4-yard pass from Zach Gibson, Liam Rickman kick (Drive: 7 plays, 63 yards, 3:57; Georgia State 10–8)
- (3:57) APP – Makai Jackson 18-yard pass from Joey Aguilar, Jackson Moore kick (Drive: 5 plays, 75 yards, 2:27; Appalachian State 15–10)
- (1:15) GAST – Michel Dukes 9-yard run (Drive: 5 plays, 68 yards, 2:36; Appalachian State 16–15)
- (0:06) APP – Jackson Moore 33-yard field goal (Drive: 10 plays, 60 yards, 1:09; Appalachian State 18–16)

Third quarter

- (8:12) APP – Dalton Stroman 23-yard pass from Joey Aguilar, Jackson Moore kick (Drive: 5 plays, 60 yards, 2:02; Appalachian State 25–16)
- (5:05) GAST – Kyle Lowe 5-yard run, Liam Rickman kick (Drive: 6 plays, 75 yards, 3:07; Appalachian State 25–23)

Fourth quarter

- (6:39) GAST – Liam Rickman 38-yard field goal (Drive: 12 plays, 70 yards, 6:47; Georgia State 26–25)
- (1:51) APP – Kanen Hamlett 4-yard pass from Joey Aguilar, Joey Aguilar rush (Drive: 10 plays, 75 yards, 4:48; Appalachian State 33–26)

Statistics	GAST	APP
First downs	20	25
Total yards	386	479
Rushing yards	194	180
Passing yards	192	299
Passing: Comp–Att–Int	16–22–0	18–27–0
Time of possession	30:34	29:26

Team	Category	Player	Statistics
Georgia State	Passing	Zach Gibson	16/22, 192 yards, TD
Georgia State	Rushing	Michel Dukes	6 carries, 81 yards, TD
Georgia State	Receiving	Ted Hurst	3 receptions, 57 yards, TD
Appalachian State	Passing	Joey Aguilar	18/27, 299 yards, 3 TD
Appalachian State	Rushing	Ahmani Marshall	18 carries, 115 yards, TD
Appalachian State	Receiving	Kaedin Robinson	5 receptions, 121 yards

=== Old Dominion ===
Game Nine – Old Dominion Monarchs (4–4) at Appalachian State Mountaineers (3–4) – Game summary

Quarter	1	2	3	4	Total
Monarchs	3	14	3	0	20
Mountaineers	7	7	7	7	28

at Kidd Brewer Stadium • Boone, NC

- Date: Saturday November 2, 2024
- Game time: 2:30 p.m.
- Game weather: Sunny • Temperature: 63 °F (17 °C) • Wind: NW 5 miles per hour (8.0 km/h)
- Game attendance: 34,954
- Referee: Marshall Lewis
- TV announcers (ESPN+): David Jackson (play-by-play) and Avery Hall (analyst)

Game information

First quarter

- (10:04) APP – Kaedin Robinson 23-yard pass from Joey Aguilar, Jackson Moore kick (Drive: 7 plays, 93 yards, 3:20; Appalachian State 7–0)
- (4:50) ODU – Ethan Sanchez 25-yard field goal (Drive: 10 plays, 67 yards, 5:14; Appalachian State 7–3)

Second quarter

- (14:21) ODU – Diante Vines 14-yard pass from Colton Joseph, Ethan Sanchez kick (Drive: 7 plays, 67 yards, 3:14; Old Dominion 10–7)
- (4:28) ODU – Isiah Paige 28-yard pass from Colton Joseph, Ethan Sanchez kick (Drive: 9 plays, 90 yards, 5:43; Old Dominion 17–7)
- (3:09) APP – Dalton Stroman 46-yard pass from Joey Aguilar, Jackson Moore kick (Drive: 3 plays, 65 yards, 1:13; Old Dominion 17–14)

Third quarter

- (8:05) APP – Kanen Hamlett 4-yard pass from Joey Aguilar, Jackson Moore kick (Drive: 7 plays, 44 yards, 2:53; Appalachian State 21–17)
- (0:55) ODU – Ethan Sanchez 25-yard field goal (Drive: 14 plays, 67 yards, 7:10; Appalachian State 21–20)

Fourth quarter

- (2:29) APP – Max Drag 11-yard pass from Joey Aguilar, Jackson Moore kick (Drive: 10 plays, 61 yards, 5:06; Appalachian State 28–20)

Statistics	ODU	APP
First downs	26	20
Total yards	498	396
Rushing yards	166	184
Passing yards	332	212
Passing: Comp–Att–Int	27–38–1	13–24–1
Time of possession	31:46	28:14

Team	Category	Player	Statistics
Old Dominion	Passing	Colton Joseph	27/38, 332 yards, 2 TD, INT
Old Dominion	Rushing	Aaron Young	14 carries, 110 yards
Old Dominion	Receiving	Isiah Page	13 receptions, 205 yards, TD
Appalachian State	Passing	Joey Aguilar	13/24, 212 yards, 4 TD, INT
Appalachian State	Rushing	Ahmani Marshall	23 carries, 120 yards
Appalachian State	Receiving	Kaedin Robinson	4 receptions, 78 yards, TD

=== at Coastal Carolina ===
Game Ten – Appalachian State Mountaineers (4–4) at Coastal Carolina Chanticleers (4–4) – Game summary

Quarter	1	2	3	4	Total
Mountaineers	0	10	0	14	24
Chanticleers	14	3	14	7	38

at Brooks Stadium • Conway, SC

- Date: Thursday November 7, 2024
- Game time: 8:00 p.m.
- Game weather: Cloudy
- Game attendance: 19,415
- Referee: Ted Pitts
- TV announcers (ESPN): Matt Barrie (play-by-play), Dan Mullen (analyst) and Harry Lyles Jr. (sideline)

Game information

First quarter

- (10:40) CCU – Braydon Bennett 12-yard run, Kade Hensley kick (Drive: 7 plays, 68 yards, 4:14; Coastal Carolina 7–0)
- (3:03) CCU – Braydon Bennett 37-yard run, Kade Hensley kick (Drive: 6 plays, 68 yards, 3:28; Coastal Carolina 14–0)

Second quarter

- (13:25) CCU – Kade Hensley 29-yard field goal (Drive: 6 plays, 37 yards, 2:25; Coastal Carolina 17–0)
- (10:23) APP – Jackson Moore 38-yard field goal (Drive: 8 plays, 56 yards, 3:02; Coastal Carolina 17–3)
- (3:07) APP – Ahmani Marshall 2-yard run, Jackson Moore kick (Drive: 10 plays, 77 yards, 5:31; Coastal Carolina 17–10)

Third quarter

- (5:02) CCU – Braydon Bennett 2-yard run, Kade Hensley kick (Drive: 17 plays, 87 yards, 8:42; Coastal Carolina 24–10)
- (4:05) CCU – Ethan Vasko 1-yard run, Kade Hensley kick (Drive: 2 plays, 1 yard, 0:42; Coastal Carolina 31–10)

Fourth quarter

- (14:19) APP – Ahmani Marshall 2-yard run, Jackson Moore kick (Drive: 12 plays, 75 yards, 4:46; Coastal Carolina 31–17)
- (2:26) CCU – Jameson Tucker 6-yard pass from Ethan Vasko, Kade Hensley kick (Drive: 4 plays, 36 yards, 0:55; Coastal Carolina 38–17)
- (1:40) APP – Kaedin Robinson 25-yard pass from Joey Aguilar, Jackson Moore kick (Drive: 4 plays, 75 yards, 0:46; Coastal Carolina 38–24)

Statistics	APP	CCU
First downs	23	19
Total yards	376	353
Rushing yards	150	203
Passing yards	226	150
Passing: Comp–Att–Int	17–31–2	14–18–0
Time of possession	29:15	30:45

Team	Category	Player	Statistics
Appalachian State	Passing	Joey Aguilar	17/31, 226 yards, TD, 2 INT
Appalachian State	Rushing	Ahmani Marshall	28 carries, 124 yards, 2 TD
Appalachian State	Receiving	Kaedin Robinson	5 receptions, 76 yards, TD
Coastal Carolina	Passing	Ethan Vasko	14/18, 150 yards, TD
Coastal Carolina	Rushing	Braydon Bennett	9 carries, 88 yards, 3 TD
Coastal Carolina	Receiving	Braydon Bennett	4 receptions, 33 yards

=== James Madison ===
Game Eleven – James Madison Dukes (8–2) at Appalachian State Mountaineers (4–5) – Game summary

Quarter	1	2	3	4	Total
Dukes	7	10	3	0	20
Mountaineers	0	24	7	3	34

at Kidd Brewer Stadium • Boone, NC

- Date: Saturday November 23, 2024
- Game time: 2:30 p.m.
- Game weather: Snow • Temperature: 40 °F (4 °C) • Wind: NW 27 miles per hour (43 km/h)
- Game attendance: 34,012
- Referee: Trennis Livingston
- TV announcers (ESPN+): David Jackson (play-by-play) and Avery Hall (analyst)

Game information

First quarter

- (11:03) JMU – Yamir Knight 6-yard pass from Alonza Barnett III, Noe Ruelas kick (Drive: 8 plays, 75 yards, 3:57; James Madison 7–0)

Second quarter

- (14:08) JMU – Josh Phifer 37-yard pass from Alonza Barnett III, Noe Ruelas kick (Drive: 4 plays, 58 yards, 1:45; James Madison 14–0)
- (12:19) APP – Michael Hughes 23-yard field goal (Drive: 6 plays, 70 yards, 1:49; James Madison 14–3)
- (7:33) APP – Eli Wilson 4-yard pass from Joey Aguilar, Michael Hughes kick (Drive: 6 plays, 50 yards, 2:14; James Madison 14–10)
- (2:49) JMU – Noe Ruelas 46-yard field goal (Drive: 11 plays, 47 yards, 4:44; James Madison 17–10)
- (1:23) APP – Makai Jackson 64-yard pass from Joey Aguilar, Michael Hughes kick (Drive: 5 plays, 75 yards, 1:26; Tied 17–17)
- (0:40) APP – Michael Hetzel 9-yard punt return, Michael Hughes kick (Appalachian State 24–17)

Third quarter

- (7:56) JMU – Noe Ruelas 52-yard field goal (Drive: 7 plays, 24 yards, 3:04; Appalachian State 24–20)
- (1:13) APP – Ahmani Marshall 1-yard run, Michael Hughes kick (Drive: 10 plays, 76 yards, 3:54; Appalachian State 31–20)

Fourth quarter

- (10:02) APP – Michael Hughes 41-yard field goal (Drive: 4 plays, 7 yards, 0:37; Appalachian State 34–20)

Statistics	JMU	APP
First downs	22	17
Total yards	400	361
Rushing yards	168	145
Passing yards	232	216
Passing: Comp–Att–Int	21–36–1	12–23–0
Time of possession	34:05	25:55

Team	Category	Player	Statistics
James Madison	Passing	Alonza Barnett III	21/36, 232 yards, 2 TD, INT
James Madison	Rushing	George Pettaway	12 carries, 82 yards
James Madison	Receiving	Yamir Knight	5 receptions, 60 yards, TD
Appalachian State	Passing	Joey Aguilar	12/23, 216 yards, 2 TD
Appalachian State	Rushing	Ahmani Marshall	24 carries, 108 yards, TD
Appalachian State	Receiving	Makai Jackson	5 receptions, 162 yards, TD

=== at Georgia Southern (rivalry) ===
Game Twelve – Appalachian State Mountaineers (5–5) at Georgia Southern Eagles (7–4) – Game summary

Quarter	1	2	3	4	Total
Mountaineers	0	6	7	7	20
Eagles	8	7	0	14	29

at Paulson Stadium, Statesboro, GA

- Date: Saturday November 30, 2024
- Game time: 6:00 p.m. EST
- Game weather: Sunny • Temperature: 40 °F (4 °C)
- Game attendance: 23,383
- Referee: Jeremy Parker
- TV announcers (ESPN+): Danny Waugh (play-by-play) and Jason Foster (analyst)

Game information

First Quarter

- (8:47) GASO – Josh Dallas 10-yard pass from JC French, Matthew Daniel two-point conversion rush (Drive: 12 plays, 75 yards, 6:13; Georgia Southern 8–0)

Second Quarter

- (8:48) APP – Eli Wilson 9-yard pass from Joey Aguilar, Two-point pass conversion attempt failed (Drive: 10 plays, 61 yards, 5:27; Georgia Southern 8–6)
- (2:51) GASO – Jalen White 4-yard rush, Gavin Stewart kick (Drive: 11 plays, 84 yards, 5:51; Georgia Southern 15–6)

Third Quarter

- (4:33) APP – Makai Jackson 6-yard pass from Joey Aguilar, Michael Hughes kick (Drive: 12 plays, 65 yards, 6:03; Georgia Southern 15–13)

Fourth Quarter

- (13:36) GASO – Jalen White 3-yard rush, Gavin Stewart kick (Drive: 11 plays, 75 yards, 5:57; Georgia Southern 22–13)
- (8:16) APP – Ahmani Marshall 1-yard rush, Michael Hughes kick (Drive: 2 plays, 41 yards, 0:20; Georgia Southern 22–20)
- (1:05) GASO – Jalen White 35-yard rush, Gavin Stewart kick (Drive: 8 plays, 86 yards, 2:47; Georgia Southern 29–20)

Statistics	APP	GASO
First downs	25	23
Total yards	465	357
Rushing yards	175	191
Passing yards	290	166
Passing: Comp–Att–Int	19-35-2	16-19-0
Time of possession	30:33	29:27

Team	Category	Player	Statistics
Appalachian State	Passing	Joey Aguilar	19/35, 290 yards, 2 TDs, 2 INTs
Appalachian State	Rushing	Ahmani Marshall	24 carries, 127 yards, 1 TD
Appalachian State	Receiving	Makai Jackson	8 receptions, 157 yards, 1 TD
Georgia Southern	Passing	JC French	16/19, 166 yards, 1 TD
Georgia Southern	Rushing	Jalen White	18 carries, 175 yards, 3 TDs
Georgia Southern	Receiving	Josh Dallas	4 receptions, 53 yards, 1 TD
