= Michael Hughes (kicker) =

American football player (born 2002)

Profile
- Position: Placekicker

Personal information
- Born: December 3, 2002 (age 23)
- Listed height: 6 ft 3 in (1.91 m)
- Listed weight: 190 lb (86 kg)

Career information
- High school: George Washington (Charleston, West Virginia)
- College: Appalachian State (2021–2024)
- NFL draft: 2025: undrafted

Career history
- Saskatchewan Roughriders (2025)

Awards and highlights
- Grey Cup champion (2025); Second-team All-Sun Belt (2023)

Career CFL statistics
- Games played: 1
- Field goals made: 2
- Field goals attempted: 2
- Field goal %: 100
- Points scored: 8
- Longest field goal: 42
- Stats at CFL.ca

Michael Hughes (born December 3, 2002) is an American professional football placekicker. He played college football for the Appalachian State Mountaineers.

== College career ==
Hughes played college football for the Appalachian State Mountaineers from 2021 to 2024. As a freshman he handled kickoff duties and kicked a successful onside kick against Coastal Carolina.

The following year, Hughes then became the primary kicker on kickoffs and field goals, going 50 for 50 on extra points and nine of twelve on field goals.

His junior year would be his best at App State, kicking at a 86.4% clip on 19 of 22 field goals and converting 54 extra point attempts. Hughes kicked four field goals against Georgia Southern, tying for the second-most in school history. For his efforts, he garnered second-team All-American and Sun Belt honors.

Hughes played just six games in his final collegiate season, missing multiple games due to injury. He made seven of eight field goals while remaining perfect on extra points, converting 16 of them. Hughes ended his career as Appalachian State's leader in field goal percentage (83.3%) and PAT percentage (100%).

== Professional career ==
Pre-draft measurables
Height	Weight	Arm length	Hand span
6 ft 2 in (1.88 m)	180 lb (82 kg)	31 1/4 in (0.79 m)	8 1/4 in (0.21 m)
All values from Pro Day

On October 7, 2025, the Saskatchewan Roughriders of the Canadian Football League (CFL) signed Hughes to the practice roster. He was later activated on October 24, 2025, making his CFL and professional debut on October 25 against the BC Lions. Hughes went perfect, converting two field goal attempts, one for 28 yards and another for 42 yards. He also added on two extra point conversions and 228 kickoff yards on three kicks, while also scoring a rouge. On November 7, 2025, Hughes was moved to the practice roster where he remained through the end of the season, including when the Roughriders won the 112th Grey Cup.

On January 23, 2026, Hughes was re-signed by the team. He was released by the team on May 13.

== Statistics ==
Legend
**Bold**	Career high

=== College ===
Year	Team	GP	Overall FGs			PATs			Points
Year	Team	GP	FGM	FGA	Pct	XPM	XPA	Pct	Points
2021	Appalachian State	**14**	0	0	–	0	0	–	0
2022	Appalachian State	12	9	12	75.0	50	50	**100.0**	77
2023	Appalachian State	**14**	**19**	**22**	86.4	**54**	**54**	**100.0**	**111**
2024	Appalachian State	6	7	8	**87.5**	16	16	**100.0**	37
Career		46	35	42	83.3	120	120	100.0	225

=== CFL ===
==== Regular season ====
Year	Team	GP	Overall FGs				PATs			Points
Year	Team	GP	FGM	FGA	LNG	Pct	XPM	XPA	Pct	Points
2025	SSK	1	2	2	42	100.0	2	2	100.0	8
Career		1	2	2	42	100.0	2	2	100.0	8
