= Jalen White =

American football player (born 2002)

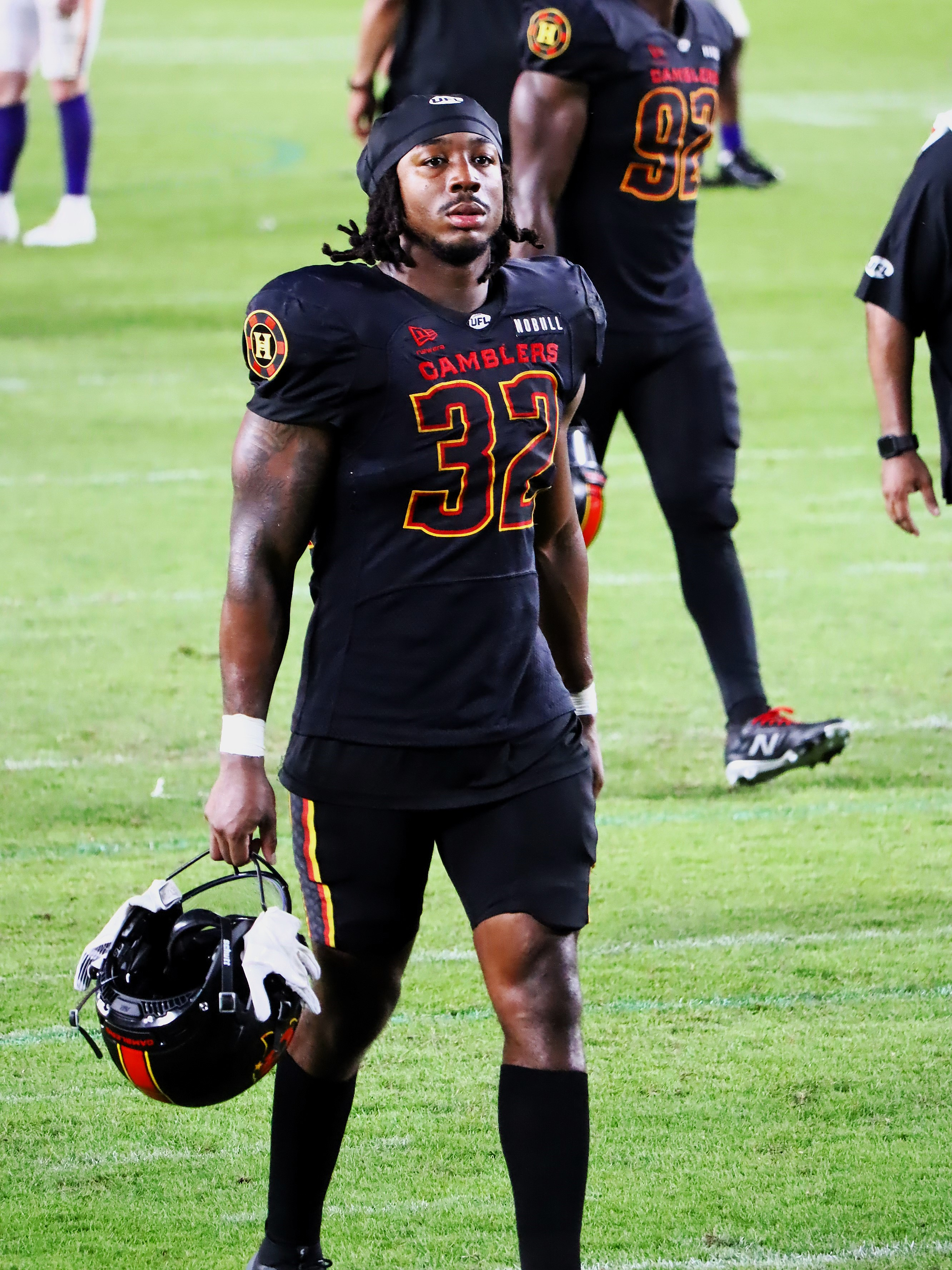
- White with the Houston Gamblers in 2026

No. 32 – Dallas Renegades
- Position: Running back
- Roster status: Active

Personal information
- Born: June 5, 2002 (age 24); Leavenworth, Kansas, U.S.
- Listed height: 6 ft 0 in (1.83 m)
- Listed weight: 205 lb (93 kg)

Career information
- High school: Daleville (Daleville, Alabama)
- College: Georgia Southern (2020–2024)
- NFL draft: 2025: undrafted

Career history
- Green Bay Packers (2025)*; Houston Gamblers (2026); Dallas Renegades (2027–present)
- * Offseason or practice squad member only

Awards and highlights
- 2× Third-team All-Sun Belt (2022, 2023)
- Stats at Pro Football Reference

Jalen Jermayne White (born June 5, 2002) is an American professional football running back for the Dallas Renegades of the United Football League (UFL). He played college football for the Georgia Southern Eagles.

== Early life ==
White attended Daleville High School in Daleville, Alabama. As a senior, White rushed for 3,517 yards, setting the record for most rushing yards in a single season in Alabama high school football history, surpassing Jamarius Henderson's previous record of 3,483 yards in 2014. A three-star recruit, White committed to play college football at Georgia Southern University over offers from South Alabama and Tennessee State.

== College career ==
After playing sparingly as a freshman in 2020, White's playing time increased the following season. Against the Arkansas State Red Wolves in 2021, he rushed for 154 yards and two touchdowns. He finished the season rushing for 383 yards and four touchdowns. In his first year as Georgia Southern's premier running back in 2022, White recorded 914 yards rushing and ten total touchdowns. As a result, he was named to the third team All-Sun Belt. Entering the 2023 season, White was named to the preseason Maxwell Award watchlist. In a game against the Louisiana–Monroe Warhawks in 2023, he rushed for a career-high 164 yards and two touchdowns, while being named the Sun Belt Offensive Player of the Week. In the 2024 season opener against the Boise State Broncos, White rushed for three touchdowns in a 56–45 defeat.

=== Statistics ===
Year	Team	Games	Rushing				Receiving			
Year	Team	GP	Att	Yards	Avg	TD	Rec	Yards	Avg	TD
2020	Georgia Southern	12	20	86	4.3	0	0	0	0.0	0
2021	Georgia Southern	12	68	383	5.6	4	1	10	10.0	0
2022	Georgia Southern	11	162	914	5.6	10	22	217	9.9	1
2023	Georgia Southern	11	160	889	5.6	9	17	69	4.1	1
2024	Georgia Southern	13	163	744	4.6	13	20	69	3.5	0
Career		59	573	3,016	5.3	36	60	365	6.1	2

== Professional career ==
Pre-draft measurables
Height	Weight	Arm length	Hand span	Wingspan	40-yard dash	10-yard split	20-yard split	20-yard shuttle	Three-cone drill	Vertical jump	Broad jump	Bench press
6 ft 0 in (1.83 m)	205 lb (93 kg)	32 in (0.81 m)	8 3/4 in (0.22 m)	6 ft 2 1/4 in (1.89 m)	4.60 s	1.56 s	2.65 s	4.44 s	7.14 s	36.0 in (0.91 m)	10 ft 2 in (3.10 m)	20 reps
All values from Pro Day

=== Green Bay Packers ===
On May 2, 2025, White signed with the Green Bay Packers after going undrafted in the 2025 NFL draft. He was waived on August 12 with an injure designation and reverted to injured reserve the following day. On August 21, White was waived from injured reserve with a settlement.

=== Houston Gamblers ===
On March 6, 2026, White signed with the Houston Gamblers of the United Football League (UFL).
