= Ahmani Marshall =

American football player (born 2002)

No. 37 – Carolina Panthers
- Position: Running back
- Roster status: Practice squad

Personal information
- Born: March 21, 2002 (age 24); Winston-Salem, North Carolina, U.S.
- Listed height: 6 ft 1 in (1.85 m)
- Listed weight: 225 lb (102 kg)

Career information
- High school: East Forsyth (Kernersville, North Carolina)
- College: Wake Forest (2020–2021); Appalachian State (2022–2024)
- NFL draft: 2025: undrafted

Career history
- Cleveland Browns (2025)*; Carolina Panthers (2026–present)*
- * Offseason or practice squad member only

Awards and highlights
- Third-team All-Sun Belt (2024)
- Stats at Pro Football Reference

Ahmani Marshall (born March 21, 2002) is an American professional football running back for the Carolina Panthers of the National Football League (NFL). He played college football for the Wake Forest Demon Deacons and Appalachian State Mountaineers.

== College career ==
Marshall played college football for the Wake Forest Demon Deacons from 2020 to 2021 and the Appalachian State Mountaineers from 2022 to 2024. He played in only 12 games at Wake Forest, only rushing 29 times for 121 yards, before transferring to Appalachian State. Marshall appeared in 36 games for the Mountaineers over three seasons, rushing for 1,167 yards and 13 touchdowns, while also registering 15 receptions for 109 yards. In his senior year, he earned third-team All-Sun Belt honors.

=== College statistics ===
Legend
| **Bold** | Career high |

| Year | Team | Games | | Rushing | | | | Receiving | | | | Fumbles | |
| Year | Team | GP | GS | Att | Yds | Avg | TD | Rec | Yds | Avg | TD | Fum | Lost |
|---|---|---|---|---|---|---|---|---|---|---|---|---|---|
| 2020 | Wake Forest | 2 | 0 | 6 | 18 | 3.0 | 0 | 0 | 0 | 0.0 | 0 | **0** | **0** |
| 2021 | Wake Forest | 10 | 0 | 23 | 103 | 4.5 | 0 | 0 | 0 | 0.0 | 0 | **0** | **0** |
| 2022 | Appalachian State | 11 | 0 | 76 | 389 | **5.1** | 4 | 4 | 38 | **9.5** | 0 | **0** | **0** |
| 2023 | Appalachian State | **14** | 0 | 20 | 65 | 3.3 | 2 | 0 | 0 | 0.0 | 0 | **0** | **0** |
| 2024 | Appalachian State | 11 | **4** | **149** | **713** | 4.8 | **7** | **11** | **71** | 6.5 | 0 | 1 | 1 |
| Career | | 48 | 4 | 274 | 1,288 | 4.7 | 13 | 15 | 109 | 7.3 | 0 | 1 | 1 |

== Professional career ==
Pre-draft measurables
| Height | Weight | Arm length | Hand span | Wingspan | 40-yard dash | 10-yard split | 20-yard split | 20-yard shuttle | Three-cone drill | Vertical jump | Broad jump | Bench press |
|---|---|---|---|---|---|---|---|---|---|---|---|---|
| 6 ft 1 1/8 in (1.86 m) | 225 lb (102 kg) | 33 1/8 in (0.84 m) | 9 1/8 in (0.23 m) | 6 ft 5 3/4 in (1.97 m) | 4.61 s | 1.59 s | 2.68 s | 4.51 s | 7.43 s | 32.0 in (0.81 m) | 10 ft 0 in (3.05 m) | 19 reps |
All values from Pro Day

=== Cleveland Browns ===
After not being selected in the 2025 NFL draft, Marshall signed with the Cleveland Browns as an undrafted free agent. He was waived on August 26, 2025, before signing to the practice squad the following day. On October 27, Marshall was released by the Browns. He was re-signed on December 2. Marshall signed a reserve/future contract with Cleveland on January 5, 2026.

On August 30, 2026, Marshall was waived by the Browns as a part of final roster cuts.

=== Carolina Panthers ===
On September 3, 2026, Marshall was signed to the Carolina Panthers' practice squad.
