= 2024 Southern Miss Golden Eagles football team =

American college football season

2024 Southern Miss Golden Eagles football
- Conference: Sun Belt Conference
- West Division
- Record: 1–11 (0–8 Sun Belt)
- Head coach: Will Hall (4th season; first 7 games); Reed Stringer (interim; remainder of season)
- Offensive coordinator: Chip Long (1st season)
- Offensive scheme: Multiple
- Defensive coordinator: Clay Bignell (1st season)
- Base defense: 4–2–5
- Home stadium: M. M. Roberts Stadium

2024 Sun Belt Conference football standings
	Conf.			Overall
Team	W		L	W		L
East Division
Marshall xy$	7	–	1	10	–	3
Georgia Southern	6	–	2	8	–	5
James Madison	4	–	4	9	–	4
Old Dominion	4	–	4	5	–	7
Coastal Carolina	3	–	5	6	–	7
Appalachian State	3	–	5	5	–	6
Georgia State	1	–	7	3	–	9
West Division
Louisiana xy	7	–	1	10	–	4
Texas State	5	–	3	8	–	5
Arkansas State	5	–	3	8	–	5
South Alabama	5	–	3	7	–	6
Louisiana–Monroe	3	–	5	5	–	7
Troy	3	–	5	4	–	8
Southern Miss	0	–	8	1	–	11
Championship: Marshall 31, Louisiana 3
$ – Conference champion; x – Division champion/co-champions; y – Championship game participant

The 2024 Southern Miss Golden Eagles football team represented the University of Southern Mississippi in the Sun Belt Conference's West Division during the 2024 NCAA Division I FBS football season. The Golden Eagles were led by fourth-year head coach Will Hall for the first seven games. The Golden Eagles played home games at M. M. Roberts Stadium, located in Hattiesburg, Mississippi.

On October 20, head coach Will Hall was fired after a 1–6 start. The Golden Eagles went 14–30 under Hall through four seasons, with only one winning season. Assistant head coach/general manager Reed Stringer was named interim head coach.

== Preseason ==
=== Media poll ===
In the Sun Belt preseason coaches' poll, the Golden Eagles were picked to finish sixth place in the West division.

== Schedule ==
The football schedule was announced on March 1, 2024.

Date	Time	Opponent	Site	TV	Result	Attendance
August 31	6:45 p.m.	at Kentucky*	Kroger Field; Lexington, KY	SECN	L 0–31	61,627
September 7	6:00 p.m.	Southeastern Louisiana*	M. M. Roberts Stadium; Hattiesburg, MS	ESPN+	W 35–10	22,044
September 14	6:00 p.m.	South Florida*	M. M. Roberts Stadium; Hattiesburg, MS	ESPN+	L 24–49	28,146
September 21	2:00 p.m.	at Jacksonville State*	AmFirst Stadium; Jacksonville, AL	ESPN+	L 7–44	21,788
October 5	6:00 p.m.	Louisiana	M. M. Roberts Stadium; Hattiesburg, MS	ESPN+	L 13–23	24,041
October 12	4:00 p.m.	at Louisiana–Monroe	Malone Stadium; Monroe, LA	ESPN+	L 21–38	22,645
October 19	6:00 p.m.	Arkansas State^{†}	M. M. Roberts Stadium; Hattiesburg, MS	ESPN+	L 28–44	24,542
October 26	2:30 p.m.	at James Madison	Bridgeforth Stadium; Harrisonburg, VA	ESPN+	L 15–32	25,399
November 9	2:00 p.m.	Marshall	M. M. Roberts Stadium; Hattiesburg, MS	ESPN+	L 3–37	20,502
November 16	6:00 p.m.	at Texas State	UFCU Stadium; San Marcos, TX	ESPN+	L 3–58	22,618
November 23	2:00 p.m.	South Alabama	M. M. Roberts Stadium; Hattiesburg, MS	ESPN+	L 14–35	20,074
November 30	1:00 p.m.	at Troy	Veterans Memorial Stadium; Troy, AL	ESPN+	L 20–52	19,521
*Non-conference game; ^{†}Homecoming; Rankings from AP Poll and CFP Rankings released prior to game; All times are in Central time

== Game summaries ==
=== at Kentucky ===
Game One – Southern Miss Golden Eagles (0–0) at Kentucky Wildcats (0–0) – Game summary

Quarter	1	2	3	4	Total
Golden Eagles	0	0	0	0	0
Wildcats	7	17	7	0	31

at Kroger Field • Lexington, Kentucky

- Date: Saturday August 31, 2024
- Game time: 6:45 p.m.
- Game weather: Cloudy • Temperature: 75 °F (24 °C) • Wind: NE at 5 miles per hour (8.0 km/h)
- Game attendance: 61,627
- Referee: Steve Marlowe
- TV announcers (SECN): Tom Hart (play-by-play), Jordan Rodgers (color), and Cole Cubelic (sideline)

Game information

First quarter

- (6:03) UK – Barion Brown 12-yard pass from Brock Vandagriff (Alex Raynor kick) (Drive: 10 plays, 59 yards, 5:54; UK 7–0)

Second quarter

- (7:45) UK – Alex Raynor 41-yard field goal (Drive: 4 plays, 9 yards, 2:01; UK 10–0)
- (3:07) UK – Demie Sumo-Karngbaye 1-yard run (Alex Raynor kick) (Drive: 7 plays, 75 yards, 2:59; UK 17–0)
- (0:31) UK – Barion Brown 12-yard pass from Brock Vandagriff (Alex Raynor kick) (Drive: 3 plays, 29 yards, 1:21; UK 24–0)

Third quarter

- (0:00) UK – Jordan Dingle 5-yard pass from Brock Vandagriff (Alex Raynor kick) (Drive: 7 plays, 84 yards, 12:54; UK 31–0)

Fourth quarter

Game suspended at 11:51 pm with 9:56 remaining in 3rd quarter

Statistics	USM	UK
First downs	7	19
Plays–yards	31–131	42–317
Rushes–yards	12–5	24–148
Passing yards	126	169
Passing: Comp–Att–Int	13–19–2	12–18–1
Time of possession	15:04	29:56

Team	Category	Player	Statistics
Southern Miss	Passing	Tate Rodemaker	12/19, 126 yards, 2 INT
Southern Miss	Rushing	Ethan Crawford	3 carries, 12 yards
Southern Miss	Receiving	Dannis Jackson	3 receptions, 42 yards
Kentucky	Passing	Brock Vandagriff	12/18, 169 yards, 3 TD, INT
Kentucky	Rushing	Demie Sumo-Karngbaye	8 carries, 59 yards, TD
Kentucky	Receiving	Barion Brown	4 receptions, 28 yards, 2 TD

=== Southeastern Louisiana (FCS) ===
Game Two – Southeastern Louisiana Lions (FCS) (0–1) at Southern Miss Golden Eagles (0–1) – Game summary

Quarter	1	2	3	4	Total
Lions (FCS)	3	7	0	0	10
Golden Eagles	7	7	7	14	35

at M. M. Roberts Stadium • Hattiesburg, Mississippi

- Date: Saturday September 7, 2024
- Game time: 6:00 p.m.
- Game weather: Sunny • Temperature: 83 °F (28 °C) • Wind: NE at 7 miles per hour (11 km/h)
- Game attendance: 22,044
- Referee: Bruce Austin
- TV announcers (ESPN+): Jason Baker (play-by-play) and Austin Davis (analyst)

Game information

First quarter

- (8:14) SLU – Riley Callaghan 25-yard field goal (Drive: 4 plays, 3 yards, 1:58; SLU 3–0)
- (1:03) USM – Kyirin Heath 9-yard pass from Tate Rodemaker (Andrew Stein kick) (Drive: 4 plays, 13 yards, 2:14; USM 7–3)

Second quarter

- (7:11) USM – Dalton Davis 5-yard pass from Tate Rodemaker (Andrew Stein kick) (Drive: 11 plays, 88 yards, 4:53; USM 14–3)
- (0:14) SLU – Anthonio Martin Jr. 10-yard run (Riley Callaghan kick) (Drive: 10 plays, 69 yards, 3:03; USM 14–10)

Third quarter

- (5:22) USM – Rodrigues Clark 1-yard run (Andrew Stein kick) (Drive: 5 plays, 64 yards, 1:55; USM 21–10)

Fourth quarter

- (13:19) USM – Dylan Lawrence 63-yard interception (Andrew Stein kick) (USM 28–10)
- (1:44) USM – Kenyon Clay 70-yard run (Andrew Stein kick) (Drive: 1 play, 70 yards, 0:11; USM 35–10)

Statistics	SELA	USM
First downs	18	17
Plays–yards	74–274	60–359
Rushes–yards	33–102	26–121
Passing yards	172	238
Passing: Comp–Att–Int	22–41–1	19–34–0
Time of possession	34:21	25:39

Team	Category	Player	Statistics
Southeastern Louisiana	Passing	Eli Sawyer	21/39, 153 yards, INT
Southeastern Louisiana	Rushing	Anthonio Martin Jr.	15 carries, 93 yards, TD
Southeastern Louisiana	Receiving	Darius Lewis	7 receptions, 51 yards
Southern Miss	Passing	Tate Rodemaker	18/33, 179 yards, 2 TD
Southern Miss	Rushing	Kenyon Clay	4 carries, 75 yards, TD
Southern Miss	Receiving	Larry Simmons	5 receptions, 100 yards

=== South Florida ===
Game Three – South Florida Bulls (1–1) at Southern Miss Golden Eagles (1–1) – Game summary

Quarter	1	2	3	4	Total
Bulls	14	14	14	7	49
Golden Eagles	0	0	0	3	3

at M. M. Roberts Stadium • Hattiesburg, Mississippi

- Date: Saturday September 14, 2024
- Game time: 6:00 p.m.
- Game weather: Cloudy • Temperature: 84 °F (29 °C) • Wind: NW at 2 miles per hour (3.2 km/h)
- Game attendance: 23,537
- Referee: Edwin Lee
- TV announcers (ESPN+): Jason Baker (play-by-play), Austin Davis (analyst)

Game information

First quarter

- (12:22) USM – Kyirin Heath 19 yard pass from Tate Rodemaker, Andrew Stein kick (Drive: 6 plays, 87 yards, 2:33; Southern Miss 7–0)
- (7:05) USM – Kenyon Clay 37 yard pass from Tate Rodemaker, Andrew Stein kick (Drive: 7 plays, 65 yards, 3:00; Southern Miss 14–0)
- (2:55) USF – Payten Singletary 4 yard pass from Byrum Brown, John Cannon kick (Drive: 11 plays, 64 yards, 4:03; Southern Miss 14–7)
- (0:32) USF – Kelley Joiner 43 yard run, John Cannon kick (Drive: 2 plays, 38 yards, 0:13; Tied 14–14)

Second quarter

- (10:52) USF – Josh Hardeman 3 yard pass from Byrum Brown, John Cannon kick (Drive: 13 plays, 72 yards, 3:22; South Florida 21–14)
- (4:29) USF – Byrum Brown 1 yard run, John Cannon kick (Drive: 3 plays, 17 yards, 1:08; South Florida 28–14)
- (2:31) USM – Ethan Crawford 8 yard run, Andrew Stein kick (Drive: 4 plays, 75 yards, 1:58; South Florida 28–21)

Third quarter

- (8:12) USF – Ta'Ron Keith 3 yard run, John Cannon kick (Drive: 14 plays, 79 yards, 6:42; South Florida 35–21)
- (1:02) USF – Nay'Quan Wright 33 yard run, John Cannon kick (Drive: 8 plays, 93 yards, 3:20; South Florida 42–21)

Fourth quarter

- (9:25) USF – Kelley Joiner 50 yard run, John Cannon kick (Drive: 5 plays, 76 yards, 1:55; South Florida 49–21)
- (7:05) USM – Connor Gibbs 31 yard field goal (Drive: 6 plays, 61 yards, 2:21; South Florida 49–24)

Statistics	USF	USM
First downs	27	19
Plays–yards	81–562	61–487
Rushes–yards	51–369	28–90
Passing yards	193	397
Passing: Comp–Att–Int	19–30–0	19–33–1
Time of possession	33:39	26:21

Team	Category	Player	Statistics
South Florida	Passing	Byrum Brown	19/29, 193 yards, 2 TD
South Florida	Rushing	Kelley Joiner	10 carries, 117 yards, 2 TD
South Florida	Receiving	Sean Atkins	5 receptions, 87 yards
Southern Miss	Passing	Ethan Crawford	6/13, 183 yards, 1 INT
Southern Miss	Rushing	Rodrigues Clark	15 carries, 85 yards
Southern Miss	Receiving	Tiaquelin Mims	6 receptions, 128 yards

=== at Jacksonville State ===
Game Four – Southern Miss Golden Eagles (1–2) at Jacksonville State Gamecocks (0–3) – Game summary

Quarter	1	2	3	4	Total
Golden Eagles	0	7	0	0	7
Gamecocks	14	7	23	0	44

at AmFirst Stadium • Jacksonville, Alabama

- Date: Saturday September 21, 2024
- Game time: 2:00 p.m.
- Game weather: Sunny • Temperature: 91 °F (33 °C) • Wind: NW at 4 miles per hour (6.4 km/h)
- Game attendance: 21,788
- Referee: Scott Broadway
- TV announcers (ESPN+): Eli Gold (play-by-play) and Bill Clark (analyst)

Game information

First quarter

- (11:44) JVST – Tre Stewart 32-yard run, Garrison Rippa kick (Drive: 3 plays, 65 yards, 0:55; Jacksonville State 7–0)
- (4:44) JVST – Anwar Lewis 7-yard run, Garrison Rippa kick (Drive: 9 plays, 59 yards, 3:25; Jacksonville State 14–0)

Second quarter

- (10:39) USM – John White 2-yard run, Connor Gibbs kick (Drive: 10 plays, 43 yards, 5:02; Jacksonville State 14–7)
- (6:58) JVST – Tyler Huff 6-yard run, Garrison Rippa kick (Drive: 9 plays, 75 yards, 3:41; Jacksonville State 21–7)

Third quarter

- (14:15) JVST – Brock Rechsteiner 85-yard pass from Tyler Huff (Drive: 2 plays, 75 yards, 0:45; Jacksonville State 27–7)
- (12:05) JVST – Anwar Lewis 2-yard run, Garrison Rippa kick (Drive: 4 plays, 26 yards, 1:23; Jacksonville State 34–7)
- (6:44) JVST – Garrison Rippa 43-yard field goal (Drive: 7 plays, 40 yards, 3:25; Jacksonville State 37–7)
- (2:19) JVST – Tre Stewart 5-yard run, Garrison Rippa kick (Drive: 5 plays, 63 yards, 2:02; Jacksonville State 44–7)

Fourth quarter

No scoring plays

Statistics	USM	JVST
First downs	16	22
Plays–yards	60–246	64–509
Rushes–yards	37–114	48–273
Passing yards	132	236
Passing: Comp–Att–Int	12–23–4	14–16–1
Time of possession	28:51	31:09

Team	Category	Player	Statistics
Southern Miss	Passing	John White	9/18, 117 yards, 2 INT
Southern Miss	Rushing	Kenyon Clay	10 carries, 49 yards
Southern Miss	Receiving	Tiaquelin Mims	6 receptions, 43 yards
Jacksonville State	Passing	Tyler Huff	14/16, 236 yards, TD, INT
Jacksonville State	Rushing	Tre Stewart	16 carries, 96 yards, 2 TD
Jacksonville State	Receiving	Brock Rechsteiner	2 receptions, 90 yards, TD

=== Louisiana ===
Game Five – Louisiana Ragin' Cajuns (3–1) at Southern Miss Golden Eagles (1–3)

Quarter	1	2	3	4	Total
Ragin' Cajuns	3	14	3	3	23
Golden Eagles	0	13	0	0	13

at M. M. Roberts Stadium, Hattiesburg, MS

- Date: Saturday October 5, 2024
- Game time: 6:00 p.m. CDT
- Game weather: Cloudy • Temperature: 82 °F (28 °C) • Wind: NE at 5 miles per hour (8.0 km/h)
- Game attendance: 24,041
- Referee: Ted Pitts
- TV announcers (ESPN+): Jason Baker (play-by-play) and Austin Davis (analyst)

Game information

First Quarter

- (9:47) LA – Kenneth Almendares 21-yard field goal (Drive: 10 plays, 75 yards, 5:08; Louisiana 3–0)

Second Quarter

- (13:26) LA – Lance LeGendre 15-yard pass from Ben Wooldridge, Kenneth Almendares kick (Drive: 10 plays, 66 yards, 4:12; Louisiana 10–0)
- (11:19) USM – Kenyon Clay 1-yard run, Connor Gibbs kick (Drive: 6 plays, 80 yards, 1:59; Louisiana 10–7)
- (8:51) LA – Dre'lyn Washington 21-yard run, Kenneth Almendares kick (Drive: 5 plays, 67 yards, 2:19; Louisiana 17–7)
- (1:40) USM – Kenyon Clay 5-yard run (Drive: 8 plays, 82 yards, 2:23; Louisiana 17–13)

Third Quarter

- (2:07) LA – Kenneth Almendares 30-yard field goal (Drive: 15 plays, 76 yards, 8:14; Louisiana 20–13)

Fourth Quarter

- (5:29) LA – Kenneth Almendares 19-yard field goal (Drive: 11 plays, 52 yards, 7:05; Louisiana 23–13)

Statistics	LA	USM
First downs	22	8
Plays–yards	76–410	39–177
Rushes–yards	46–188	18–37
Passing yards	222	140
Passing: Comp–Att–Int	22–30–0	15–21–0
Time of possession	41:35	18:25

Team	Category	Player	Statistics
Louisiana	Passing	Ben Wooldridge	22/30, 222 yards, TD
Louisiana	Rushing	Dre'lyn Washington	12 carries, 91 yards, TD
Louisiana	Receiving	Terrance Carter	7 receptions, 64 yards
Southern Miss	Passing	Tate Rodemaker	15/21, 140 yards
Southern Miss	Rushing	Rodrigues Clark	7 carries, 61 yards
Southern Miss	Receiving	Kenyon Clay	1 reception, 31 yards

=== at Louisiana–Monroe ===
Game Six – Southern Miss Golden Eagles (1–4) at Louisiana–Monroe Warhawks (4–1) – Game summary

Quarter	1	2	3	4	Total
Golden Eagles	3	3	8	7	21
Warhawks	7	7	3	21	38

at Malone Stadium • Monroe, LA

- Date: Saturday October 12, 2024
- Game time: 4:00 p.m.
- Game weather: Sunny • Temperature: 89 °F (32 °C) • Wind: S at 6 miles per hour (9.7 km/h)
- Game attendance: 22,645
- Referee: Scott Broadway
- TV announcers (ESPN+): Sean Fox (play-by-play) and Desmund Lighten (analyst)

Game information

First quarter

- (3:08) USM – Connor Gibbs 22-yard field goal (Drive: 11 plays, 59 yards, 5:35; Southern Miss 3–0)
- (0:00) ULM – Ahmad Hardy 34-yard run, Max Larson kick (Drive: 6 plays, 75 yards, 3:07; Louisiana–Monroe 7–3)

Second quarter

- (13:19) ULM – James Jones 36-yard pass from Aidan Armenta, Max Larson kick (Drive: 3 plays, 43 yards, 0:55; Louisiana–Monroe 14–3)
- (0:02) USM – Connor Gibbs 37-yard field goal (Drive: 7 plays, 80 yards, 1:39; Louisiana–Monroe 14–6)

Third quarter

- (8:50) ULM – Max Larson 47-yard field goal (Drive: 7 plays, 43 yards, 4:05; Louisiana–Monroe 17–6)
- (2:08) USM – Braxton Myers 69-yard blocked field goal return, Tiaquelin Mims pass (Louisiana–Monroe 17–14)

Fourth quarter

- (14:09) ULM – Julian Nixon 6-yard pass from Aidan Armenta, Max Larson kick (Drive: 6 plays, 75 yards, 2:58; Louisiana–Monroe 24–14)
- (9:04) ULM – Aidan Armenta 4-yard run, Max Larson kick (Drive: 6 plays, 49 yards, 3:28; Louisiana–Monroe 31–14)
- (2:43) ULM – Ahmad Hardy 31-yard run, Luke Stagg kick (Drive: 2 plays, 34 yards, 0:55; Louisiana–Monroe 38–14)
- (0:22) ULM – Kenyon Clay 1-yard run, Connor Gibbs kick (Drive: 9 plays, 78 yards, 2:16; Louisiana–Monroe 38–21)

Statistics	USM	ULM
First downs	18	17
Plays–yards	64–347	61–432
Rushes–yards	38–182	42–246
Passing yards	165	186
Passing: Comp–Att–Int	9–26–1	12–19–0
Time of possession	26:45	33:15

Team	Category	Player	Statistics
Southern Miss	Passing	Ethan Crawford	9/26, 165 yards, INT
Southern Miss	Rushing	Ethan Crawford	17 carries, 70 yards
Southern Miss	Receiving	Dannis Jackson	1 reception, 47 yards
Louisiana–Monroe	Passing	Aidan Armenta	10/17, 188 yards, 2 TD
Louisiana–Monroe	Rushing	Ahmad Hardy	15 carries, 121 yards, 2 TD
Louisiana–Monroe	Receiving	Ahmad Hardy	2 receptions, 53 yards

=== Arkansas State ===
Game Seven – Arkansas State Red Wolves (3–3) at Southern Miss Golden Eagles (1–5) – Game summary

Quarter	1	2	3	4	Total
Red Wolves	21	7	13	3	44
Golden Eagles	7	14	0	7	28

at M. M. Roberts Stadium, Hattiesburg, MS

- Date: Saturday October 19, 2024
- Game time: 6:00 p.m.
- Game weather: Sunny • Temperature: 75 °F (24 °C) • Wind: NE 4 miles per hour (6.4 km/h)
- Game attendance: 24,542
- Referee: Marshall Lewis
- TV announcers (ESPN+): Jason Baker (play-by-play) and Austin Davis (analyst)

Game information

First quarter

- (11:49) ARST – Adam Jones 14-yard pass from Jaylen Raynor, Clune Van Andel kick (Drive: 9 plays, 75 yards, 3:11; Arkansas State 7–0)
- (10:11) ARST – Malik Hornsby 73-yard run, Clune Van Andel (Drive: 1 play, 73 yards, 0:13; Arkansas State 14–0)
- (5:26) USM – Kenyon Clay 1-yard run, Connor Gibbs kick (Drive: 11 plays, 75 yards, 4:45; Arkansas State 14–7)
- (0:59) ARST – Ja'Quez Cross 10-yard pass from Jaylen Raynor, Clune Van Andel kick (Drive: 11 plays, 68 yards, 4:21; Arkansas State 21–7)

Second quarter

- (7:24) USM – Ethan Crawford 5-yard run, Connor Gibbs kick (Drive: 11 plays, 65 yards, 4:38; Arkansas State 21–14)
- (4:48) ARST – Corey Rucker 13-yard pass from Jaylen Raynor, Clune Van Andel kick (Drive: 6 plays, 65 yards, 2:38; Arkansas State 28–14)
- (0:54) USM – Jalen Washington 4-yard run, Connor Gibbs kick (Drive: 10 plays, 73 yards, 3:54; Arkansas State 28–21)

Third quarter

- (8:37) ARST – Ja'Quez Cross 10-yard run, Clune Van Andel kick (Drive: 11 plays, 72 yards, 4:55; Arkansas State 35–21)
- (7:22) ARST – Clune Van Andel 25-yard field goal (Drive: 5 plays, 5 yards, 1:04; Arkansas State 38–21)
- (5:24) ARST – Clune Van Andel 36-yard field goal (Drive: 4 plays, 3 yards, 1:28; Arkansas State 41–21)

Fourth quarter

- (9:57) USM – Ethan Crawford 3-yard run, Connor Gibbs kick (Drive: 15 plays, 74 yards, 6:18; Arkansas State 41–28)
- (0:50) ARST – Clune Van Andel 20-yard field goal (Drive: 17 plays, 72 yards, 9:07; Arkansas State 44–28)

Statistics	ARST	USM
First downs	23	24
Total yards	467	367
Rushing yards	281	180
Passing yards	186	187
Turnovers	0	3
Time of possession	31:13	28:47

Team	Category	Player	Statistics
Arkansas State	Passing	Jaylen Raynor	20/31, 186 yards, 3 TD
Arkansas State	Rushing	Ja'Quez Cross	18 carries, 127 yards, TD
Arkansas State	Receiving	Courtney Jackson	3 receptions, 55 yards
Southern Miss	Passing	Ethan Crawford	15/23, 187 yards, INT
Southern Miss	Rushing	Ethan Crawford	26 carries, 87 yards, 2 TD
Southern Miss	Receiving	Reed Jesiolowski	4 receptions, 51 yards

=== at James Madison ===
Game Eight – Southern Miss Golden Eagles (1–6) at James Madison Dukes (5–2) – Game summary

Quarter	1	2	3	4	Total
Golden Eagles	3	6	6	0	15
Dukes	0	17	8	7	32

at Bridgeforth Stadium, Harrisonburg, VA

- Date: Saturday October 26, 2024
- Game time: 2:30 p.m. CDT
- Game weather: Sunny
- Game attendance: 25,399
- Referee: Jeremy Parker
- TV announcers (ESPN+): Curt Dudley (play-by-play), Delvin Joyce (analyst) and David Hulvey (sideline)

Game information

First quarter

- (10:29) USM – Connor Gibbs 44-yard field goal (Drive: 5 plays, 18 yards, 1:12; Southern Miss 3–0)

Second quarter

- (13:57) JMU – Cristiano Rosa 40-yard field goal (Drive: 6 plays, 50 yards, 2:06; Tied 3–3)
- (5:49) JMU – George Pettaway 4-yard run, Cristiano Rosa kick (Drive: 5 plays, 67 yards, 1:55; James Madison 10–3)
- (4:50) JMU – Taylor Thompson 10-yard pass from Alonza Barnett III, Cristiano Rosa kick (Drive: 1 play, 10 yards, 0:06; James Madison 17–3)
- (1:55) USM – Connor Gibbs 54-yard field goal (Drive: 7 plays, 38 yards, 2:55; James Madison 17–6)
- (0:00) USM – Connor Gibbs 46-yard field goal (Drive: 8 plays, 37 yards, 1:14; James Madison 17–9)

Third quarter

- (14:47) JMU – Cam Ross 94-yard kickoff return (James Madison 23–9)
- (10:47) USM – Kenyon Clay 15-yard run (Drive: 9 plays, 75 yards, 4:00; James Madison 23–15)
- (10:47) JMU – Chris Shearin 0-yard PAT return (James Madison 25–15)

Fourth quarter

- (12:05) JMU – Cam Ross 7-yard pass from Alonza Barnett III, Cristiano Rosa kick (Drive: 12 plays, 94 yards, 5:22; James Madison 32–15)

Statistics	USM	JMU
First downs	19	18
Total yards	319	357
Rushing yards	141	199
Passing yards	178	158
Passing: Comp–Att–Int	11–34–1	16–26–1
Time of possession	30:16	29:44

Team	Category	Player	Statistics
Southern Miss	Passing	Ethan Crawford	11/34, 178 yards, INT
Southern Miss	Rushing	Kenyon Clay	8 carries, 69 yards, TD
Southern Miss	Receiving	Dannis Jackson	5 receptions, 94 yards
James Madison	Passing	Alonza Barnett III	15/25, 135 yards, 2 TD, INT
James Madison	Rushing	George Pettaway	16 carries, 119 yards, TD
James Madison	Receiving	Wayne Knight	2 receptions, 41 yards

=== Marshall ===
Game Nine – Marshall Thundering Herd (5–3) at Southern Miss Golden Eagles (1–7) – Game summary

Quarter	1	2	3	4	Total
Thundering Herd	3	14	17	3	37
Golden Eagles	0	3	0	0	3

at M. M. Roberts Stadium, Hattiesburg, MS

- Date: Saturday November 9, 2024
- Game time: 2:00 p.m. CDT
- Game weather: Clear • Temperature: 85 °F (29 °C) • Wind: SE 7 mph
- Game attendance: 20,502
- Referee: Tim Barker
- TV announcers (ESPN+): Jason Baker (play-by-play) and Austin Davis (analyst)

Game information

First quarter

- (12:40) MRSH – Nathan Totten 23 yard field goal (Drive: 5 plays, 76 yards, 1:05; Marshall 3–0)

Second quarter

- (13:43) MRSH – Braylon Braxton 2 yard run, Nathan Totten kick (Drive: 7 plays, 48 yards, 3:39; Marshall 10–0)
- (10:02) USM – Connor Gibbs 51 yard field goal (Drive: 8 plays, 41 yards, 3:41; Marshall 10–3)
- (6:42) MRSH – Ethan Payne 36 yard run, Nathan Totten kick (Drive: 7 plays, 75 yards, 3:20; Marshall 17–3)

Third quarter

- (13:29) MRSH – Tychaun Chapman 14 yard run, Nathan Totten kick (Drive: 4 plays, 73 yards, 1:24; Marshall 24–3)
- (10:45) MRSH – Toby Payne 18 yard pass from Braylon Braxton, Nathan Totten kick (Drive: 4 plays, 41 yards, 1:23; Marshall 31–3)
- (3:19) MRSH – Nathan Totten 27 yard field goal (Drive: 14 plays, 41 yards, 6:14; Marshall 34–3)

Fourth quarter

- (8:26) MRSH – Nathan Totten 26 yard field goal (Drive: 9 plays, 63 yards, 3:41; Marshall 37–3)

Statistics	MRSH	USM
First downs	21	8
Total yards	526	183
Rushing yards	267	113
Passing yards	259	70
Passing: Comp–Att–Int	16–25–1	5–18–3
Time of possession	33:25	26:35

Team	Category	Player	Statistics
Marshall	Passing	Braylon Braxton	14/21, 220 yards, TD, INT
Marshall	Rushing	Ethan Payne	13 carries, 104 yards, TD
Marshall	Receiving	Christian Fitzpatrick	2 receptions, 78 yards
Southern Miss	Passing	Ethan Crawford	5/18, 70 yards, 3 INT
Southern Miss	Rushing	Rodrigues Clark	8 carries, 61 yards
Southern Miss	Receiving	Tiaquelin Mims	1 reception, 35 yards

=== at Texas State ===
Game Ten – Southern Miss Golden Eagles (1–8) at Texas State Bobcats (5–4)

Quarter	1	2	3	4	Total
Golden Eagles	0	3	0	0	3
Bobcats	21	13	17	17	68

at UFCU Stadium, San Marcos, TX

- Date: November 16
- Game time: 6:00 p.m. CDT
- Game weather: Sunny
- Game attendance: 22,618
- Referee: Ted Pitts
- TV announcers (ESPN+): Brant Freeman (play-by-play) and Bill Culhane (analyst)

Game information

First Quarter

- (10:06) TXST – Ismail Mahdi 11-yard pass from Jordan McCloud, Mason Shipley kick (Drive: 12 plays, 87 yards, 4:49; Texas State 7–0)
- (5:35) TXST – Konner Fox 23-yard pass from Jordan McCloud, Mason Shipley kick (Drive: 7 plays, 88 yards, 2:08; Texas State 14–0)
- (2:12) TXST – Brad Jackson 10-yard run, Mason Shipley kick (Drive: 5 plays, 41 yards, 1:38; Texas State 21–0)

Second Quarter

- (10:22) USM – Connor Gibbs 46-yard field goal (Drive: 13 plays, 46 yards, 6:50; Texas State 21–3)
- (9:33) TXST – Jaden Williams 29-yard pass from Jordan McCloud (Drive: 4 plays, 70 yards, 0:49; Texas State 27–3)
- (0:34) TXST – Ismail Mahdi 15-yard pass from Jordan McCloud, Mason Shipley kick (Drive: 4 plays, 74 yards, 0:40; Texas State 34–3)

Third Quarter

- (12:05) TXST – Torrance Burgess Jr. 57-yard field goal, Mason Shipley kick (Drive: 4 plays, 69 yards, 1:36; Texas State 41–3)
- (3:18) TXST – Mason Shipley 40-yard field goal (Drive: 11 plays, 53 yards, 4:46; Texas State 44–3)
- (2:05) TXST – Drew Donley 60-yard pass from Brad Jackson, Mason Shipley kick (Drive: 1 play, 60 yards, 0:12; Texas State 51–3)

Fourth Quarter

- (7:56) TXST – Lincoln Pare 68-yard run, Beckham Sunderland kick (Drive: 4 plays, 89 yards, 1:45; Texas State 58–3)

Win Probability

Line

Over/Under

Statistics	USM	TXST
First downs	14	33
Plays–yards	69–194	66–703
Rushes–yards	49–124	32–266
Passing yards	70	437
Passing: Comp–Att–Int	9–20–1	27–34–1
Time of possession	34:43	25:17

Team	Category	Player	Statistics
Southern Miss	Passing	Tate Rodemaker	6/15, 63 yards, INT
Southern Miss	Rushing	Rodrigues Clark	15 carries, 66 yards
Southern Miss	Receiving	Kenyon Clay	5 receptions, 43 yards
Texas State	Passing	Jordan McCloud	23/28, 335 yards, 4 TD, INT
Texas State	Rushing	Lincoln Pare	2 carries, 74 yards, TD
Texas State	Receiving	Kole Wilson	6 receptions, 116 yards

=== South Alabama ===
Game Eleven – South Alabama Jaguars (5–5) at Southern Miss Golden Eagles (1–9)

Quarter	1	2	3	4	Total
Jaguars	0	14	14	7	35
Golden Eagles	8	3	0	3	14

at M. M. Roberts Stadium, Hattiesburg, MS

- Date: November 23
- Game time: 2:00 p.m. CDT
- Game weather: Sunny • Temperature: 65 °F (18 °C) • Wind: NW 1 mph
- Game attendance: 20,074
- Referee: Scott Broadway
- TV announcers (ESPN+): Jason Baker (play-by-play) and Austin Davis (analyst)

Game information

First Quarter

- (7:54) USM – Davis Dalton 7-yard pass from Tate Rodemaker, Reed Jesiolowski rush (Drive: 14 plays, 75 yards, 7:06; Southern Miss 8–0)

Second Quarter

- (13:29) USA – Kentrel Bullock 21-yard pass from Gio Lopez, Laith Marjan kick (Drive: 9 plays, 80 yards, 3:21; Southern Miss 8–7)
- (8:33) USA – Jeremiah Webb 32-yard pass from Gio Lopez, Laith Marjan kick (Drive: 7 plays, 77 yards, 2:44; South Alabama 14–8)
- (0:00) USM – Connor Gibbs 59-yard field goal (Drive: 1 play, 0 yards, 0:04; South Alabama 14–11)

Third Quarter

- (13:25) USA – Jamaal Pritchett 40-yard pass from Gio Lopez, Laith Marjan kick (Drive: 4 plays, 75 yards, 1:35; South Alabama 21–11)
- (2:42) USA – Wesley Miller 57-yard interception, Laith Marjan kick (South Alabama 28–11)

Fourth Quarter

- (11:34) USM – Connor Gibbs 28-yard field goal (Drive: 13 plays, 54 yards, 6:02; South Alabama 28–14)
- (8:48) USA – Fluff Bothwell 2-yard run, Laith Marjan kick (Drive: 6 plays, 75 yards, 2:46; South Alabama 35–14)

Win Probability

Line

Over/Under

Statistics	USA	USM
First downs	17	21
Plays–yards	51–380	79–306
Rushes–yards	27–187	43–169
Passing yards	193	137
Passing: Comp–Att–Int	15–24–0	20–36–1
Time of possession	21:12	38:48

Team	Category	Player	Statistics
South Alabama	Passing	Gio Lopez	15/24, 193 yards, 3 TD
South Alabama	Rushing	Fluff Bothwell	6 carries, 104 yards, TD
South Alabama	Receiving	Jamaal Pritchett	8 receptions, 102 yards, TD
Southern Miss	Passing	Tate Rodemaker	15/27, 108 yards, TD
Southern Miss	Rushing	Rodrigues Clark	12 carries, 115 yards
Southern Miss	Receiving	Kenyon Clay	5 receptions, 39 yards

=== at Troy ===
Game Twelve – Southern Miss Golden Eagles (1–10) at Troy Trojans (3–8)

Quarter	1	2	3	4	Total
Golden Eagles	8	0	6	6	20
Trojans	10	7	14	21	52

at Veterans Memorial Stadium, Troy, AL

- Date: November 30
- Game time: 1:00 p.m. CDT
- Game weather: Sunny • Temperature: 53 °F (12 °C) • Wind: NE 6 mph
- Game attendance: 19,521
- Referee: Steven Robinson
- TV announcers (ESPN+): Will Kollmeyer (play-by-play), Ben Stanfield (analyst) and Junior Louissaint (sideline)

Game information

First Quarter

- (12:11) USM – Kenyon Clay 1-yard rush, Bryce Lofton two-point conversion pass to Kyirin Heath (Drive: 3 plays, 41 yards, 1:29; Southern Miss 8–0)
- (7:28) TROY – Damien Taylor 6-yard rush, Scott Taylor Renfroe kick (Drive: 10 plays, 57 yards, 4:43; Southern Miss 8–7)
- (2:59) TROY – Scott Taylor Renfroe 50-yard field goal (Drive: 9 plays, 39 yards, 3:39; Troy 10–8)

Second Quarter

- (8:50) TROY – Matthew Caldwell 14-yard rush, Scott Taylor Renfroe kick (Drive: 13 plays, 67 yards, 6:26; Troy 17–8)

Third Quarter

- (6:04) TROY – Damien Taylor 56-yard rush, Scott Taylor Renfroe kick (Drive: 1 play, 56 yards, 0:12; Troy 24–8)
- (5:46) USM – Larry Simmons 75 yard pass from Tate Rodemaker, Two-point pass conversion attempt failed (Drive: 3 plays, 29 yards, 1:09; Troy 24–14)
- (0:42) TROY – Trae Swartz 10-yard pass from Matthew Caldwell, Scott Taylor Renfroe kick (Drive: 10 plays, 75 yards, 5:04; Troy 31–14)

Fourth Quarter

- (7:05) USM – Tiaquelin Mims 4-yard pass from Tate Rodemaker, Connor Gibbs PAT failed (Drive: 3 plays, 29 yards, 1:09; Troy 31–20)
- (5:59) TROY – Damien Taylor 35-yard rush, Scott Taylor Renfroe kick (Drive: 3 plays, 49 yards, 1:05; Troy 38–20)
- (5:43) TROY – Ian Conerly-Goodly 31-yard interception returned, Scott Taylor Renfroe kick (Drive: 0 plays, 0 yards, 0:00; Troy 45–20)
- (4:08) TROY – Jordan Lovett 5-yard rush, Nick Troemel kick (Drive: 2 plays, 16 yards, 0:25; Troy 52–20)

Statistics	USM	TROY
First downs	15	24
Plays–yards	290	453
Rushes–yards	30-31	44-266
Passing yards	259	187
Passing: Comp–Att–Int	19-31-2	14-27-0
Time of possession	28:18	31:42

Team	Category	Player	Statistics
Southern Miss	Passing	Tate Rodemaker	18/30, 234 yards, 2 TDs, 2 INTs
Southern Miss	Rushing	JQ Gray	5 carries, 27 yards
Southern Miss	Receiving	Larry Simmons	4 receptions, 90 yards, 1 TD
Troy	Passing	Matthew Caldwell	14/26, 187 yards, 1 TD
Troy	Rushing	Damien Taylor	23 carries, 169 yards, 3 TDs
Troy	Receiving	Devonte Ross	5 receptions, 70 yards
