= 2024 Sun Belt Conference Football Championship Game =

2024 Hercules Tires Sun Belt Conference Football Championship Game
- 6th SBC Championship Game
Marshall Thundering Herd	Louisiana Ragin' Cajuns
(9–3)	(10–2)
31	3
Head coach: Charles Huff	Head coach: Michael Desormeaux
	1	2	3	4	Total
Marshall	7	10	7	7	31
Louisiana	3	0	0	0	3
- Date: December 7, 2024
- Season: 2024
- Stadium: Cajun Field
- Location: Lafayette, Louisiana
- MVP: QB Braylon Braxton (Marshall)
- Favorite: Louisiana by 6
- Referee: Trennis Livingston
- Attendance: 20,067

United States TV coverage
- Network: ESPN; Gridiron Radio
- Announcers: ESPN: Roy Philpott (play-by-play), Sam Acho (analyst), and Lauren Sisler (sideline reporter); Gridiron Radio: Noah Britt (play-by-play), Jon Reynolds (analyst), and Faxon Childress (sideline reporter)

2024 Sun Belt Conference football standings
	Conf.			Overall
Team	W		L	W		L
East Division
Marshall xy$	7	–	1	10	–	3
Georgia Southern	6	–	2	8	–	5
James Madison	4	–	4	9	–	4
Old Dominion	4	–	4	5	–	7
Coastal Carolina	3	–	5	6	–	7
Appalachian State	3	–	5	5	–	6
Georgia State	1	–	7	3	–	9
West Division
Louisiana xy	7	–	1	10	–	4
Texas State	5	–	3	8	–	5
Arkansas State	5	–	3	8	–	5
South Alabama	5	–	3	7	–	6
Louisiana–Monroe	3	–	5	5	–	7
Troy	3	–	5	4	–	8
Southern Miss	0	–	8	1	–	11
Championship: Marshall 31, Louisiana 3
$ – Conference champion; x – Division champion/co-champions; y – Championship game participant

The 2024 Sun Belt Conference Football Championship Game was a college football game played on December 7, 2024 at Cajun Field on the campus of University of Louisiana at Lafayette in Lafayette, Louisiana to determine the champion of the Sun Belt Conference for the 2024 season. It was the sixth edition of the Sun Belt Conference Football Championship Game. The game was played at 6:30 p.m. CST (7:30 p.m. EST) on ESPN. The game featured the Louisiana Ragin' Cajuns, the West Division champions, and the Marshall Thundering Herd, the East Division champions. Sponsored by Hercules Tires, the game was officially named as the 2024 Hercules Tires Sun Belt Football Championship.

== Teams ==
This was the third all-time meeting between Louisiana and Marshall; Louisiana won their only prior meetings.

=== Louisiana Ragin' Cajuns ===
Louisiana enters the championship game as West Division champions, having compiled a 10–2 record, 7–1 record in Sun Belt play. Louisiana clinched a spot in the championship game following its victory against ULM on November 30. This will mark Louisiana's fourth appearance in the championship game, their first since 2021.

=== Marshall Thundering Herd ===
Marshall enters the championship game as East Division champions, having compiled a 9–3 record, 7–1 record in Sun Belt play. Marshall clinched a spot in the championship game following its victory against James Madison on November 30. This will mark Marshall's first appearance in the championship game since joining the conference ahead of the 2022 season.

== Game summary ==
2024 Hercules Tires Sun Belt Football Championship
Marshall Thundering Herd (9–3, 7–1) vs. Louisiana Ragin' Cajuns (10-2, 7–1)

Quarter	1	2	3	4	Total
Marshall	7	10	7	7	31
Louisiana	3	0	0	0	3

at Cajun Field • Lafayette, LA

- Date: Saturday, December 7, 2024
- Game time: 7:30 p.m. EST
- Game weather: Temperature: 45 °F (7 °C) • Wind: W at 2 mph (3.2 km/h) • Weather: Mostly cloudy
- Game attendance: 20,067
- Referee: Trennis Livingston
- TV announcers (ESPN): ESPN: Roy Philpott (play-by-play), Sam Acho (analyst), and Lauren Sisler (sideline reporter)
  Gridiron Radio: Noah Britt (play-by-play), Jon Reynolds (analyst), and Faxon Childress (sideline reporter)

Game information

First Quarter

- (6:42) ULL – Kenneth Almendares 40 yard field goal (Drive: 5 plays, 52 yards, 2:05; Louisiana 3–0)
- (4:04) MU – Tychaun Chapman 37 yard pass from Braylon Braxton, Rece Verhoff kick (Drive: 7 plays, 75 yards, 2:38; Marshall 7–3)

Second Quarter

- (7:54) MU – Rece Verhoff 32 yard field goal (Drive: 9 plays, 54 yards, 4:14; Marshall 10–3)
- (2:47) MU – Ethan Payne 15 yard rush, Rece Verhoof kick (Drive: 7 plays, 56 yards, 3:04; Marshall 17–3)

Third Quarter

- (7:43) MU – Bralon Brown 20 yard pass from Braylon Braxton, Rece Verhoff kick (Drive: 9 plays, 56 yards, 4:24; Marshall 24–3)

Fourth Quarter

- (2:03) MU – Jordan Houston 9 yard rush, Rece Verhoff kick (Drive: 8 plays, 86 yards, 5:01; Marshall 31–3)

Statistics	MU	ULL
First downs	25	11
Plays–yards	70–410	60–255
Rushes–yards	44–217	28–56
Passing yards	193	199
Passing: comp–att–int	18–26–0	13–32–1
Time of possession	33:56	26:04

Team	Category	Player	Statistics
Marshall	Passing	Braylon Braxton	18/26, 193 yards, 2 TD
Marshall	Rushing	Jordan Houston	17 carries, 117 yards, TD
Marshall	Receiving	Tychaun Chapman	8 receptions, 86 yards, TD
Louisiana	Passing	Chandler Fields	4/8, 104 yards
Louisiana	Rushing	Zylan Perry	6 carries, 25 yards
Louisiana	Receiving	Lance LeGendre	4 receptions, 81 yards
