= 2024 Coastal Carolina Chanticleers football team =

American college football season

2024 Coastal Carolina Chanticleers football

Myrtle Beach Bowl, L 15–44 vs. UTSA
- Conference: Sun Belt Conference
- East Division
- Record: 6–7 (3–5 Sun Belt)
- Head coach: Tim Beck (2nd season)
- Offensive coordinator: Travis Trickett (2nd season)
- Offensive scheme: Multiple
- Defensive coordinator: Craig Naivar (2nd season)
- Base defense: 4–2–5
- Home stadium: Brooks Stadium

2024 Sun Belt Conference football standings
	Conf.			Overall
Team	W		L	W		L
East Division
Marshall xy$	7	–	1	10	–	3
Georgia Southern	6	–	2	8	–	5
James Madison	4	–	4	9	–	4
Old Dominion	4	–	4	5	–	7
Coastal Carolina	3	–	5	6	–	7
Appalachian State	3	–	5	5	–	6
Georgia State	1	–	7	3	–	9
West Division
Louisiana xy	7	–	1	10	–	4
Texas State	5	–	3	8	–	5
Arkansas State	5	–	3	8	–	5
South Alabama	5	–	3	7	–	6
Louisiana–Monroe	3	–	5	5	–	7
Troy	3	–	5	4	–	8
Southern Miss	0	–	8	1	–	11
Championship: Marshall 31, Louisiana 3
$ – Conference champion; x – Division champion/co-champions; y – Championship game participant

The 2024 Coastal Carolina Chanticleers football team represented Coastal Carolina University in the Sun Belt Conference's East Division during the 2024 NCAA Division I FBS football season. Led by second-year head coach Tim Beck, the Chanticleers played their home games at the Brooks Stadium, located in Conway, South Carolina.

== Preseason ==
=== Media poll ===
In the Sun Belt preseason coaches' poll, the Chanticleers were picked to finish third place in the East division.

Tight end Kendall Karr and defensive lineman Will Whitson were named to the Preseason All-Sun Belt second team offense and defense, respectively.

== Schedule ==
The football schedule was announced on March 1, 2024.

Date	Time	Opponent	Site	TV	Result	Attendance
August 29	8:00 p.m.	at Jacksonville State*	AmFirst Stadium; Jacksonville, AL	CBSSN	W 55–27	18,977
September 7	7:00 p.m.	No. 13 (FCS) William & Mary*	Brooks Stadium; Conway, SC	ESPN+	W 40–21	19,294
September 14	2:00 p.m.	at Temple*	Lincoln Financial Field; Philadelphia, PA	ESPN+	W 28–20	13,945
September 21	2:00 p.m.	Virginia*	Brooks Stadium; Conway, SC	ESPN+	L 24–43	22,104
October 5	7:00 p.m.	Old Dominion	Brooks Stadium; Conway, SC	ESPN+	W 45–37	18,552
October 10	7:30 p.m.	at James Madison	Bridgeforth Stadium; Harrisonburg, VA	ESPN2	L 7–39	25,622
October 19	12:00 p.m.	Louisiana^{†}	Brooks Stadium; Conway, SC	ESPNU	L 24–34	17,812
November 2	4:00 p.m.	at Troy	Veterans Memorial Stadium; Troy, AL	ESPN+	L 24–38	24,223
November 7	8:00 p.m.	Appalachian State	Brooks Stadium; Conway, SC	ESPN	W 38–24	19,415
November 16	1:00 p.m.	at Marshall	Joan C. Edwards Stadium; Huntington, WV	ESPN+	L 19–31	24,175
November 23	3:30 p.m.	Georgia Southern	Brooks Stadium; Conway, SC	ESPN+	L 6–26	14,556
November 30	2:00 p.m.	at Georgia State	Center Parc Stadium; Atlanta, GA	ESPN+	W 48–27	12,606
December 23	11:00 a.m.	UTSA*	Brooks Stadium; Conway, SC (Myrtle Beach Bowl)	ESPN	L 15–44	8,164
*Non-conference game; ^{†}Homecoming; Rankings from AP Poll and CFP Rankings released prior to game; All times are in Eastern time

== Game summaries ==
=== at Jacksonville State ===
Game One – Coastal Carolina Chanticleers (0-0) at Jacksonville State Gamecocks (0-0) – Game summary

Quarter	1	2	3	4	Total
Chanticleers	17	14	10	14	55
Gamecocks	3	7	0	17	27

at AmFirst Stadium • Jacksonville, AL

- Date: August 29
- Game time: 8:00 p.m.
- Game weather: Clear, 87 °F (31 °C)
- Game attendance: 18,977
- Referee: Rodney Burnette
- TV announcers (CBSSN): Jordan Kent (play-by-play) and Logan Ryan (analyst)
- Recap, Game Book

Game information

First quarter

- (11:06) CCU – Kade Hensley 25-yard field goal (Drive: 9 plays, 50 yards, 3:45; Coastal Carolina 3-0)
- (5:50) JVST – Garrison Rippa 49-yard field goal (Drive: 7 plays, 25 yards, 2:29; Tied 3-3)
- (1:12) CCU – Tray Taylor 36-yard pass from Ethan Vasko (Kade Hensley kick) (Drive: 8 plays, 77 yards, 4:30; Coastal Carolina 10-3)
- (1:01) CCU – Clev Lubin 17-yard fumble return (Kade Hensley kick) (Coastal Carolina 17-3)

Second quarter

- (11:48) CCU – Ethan Vasko 4-yard run (Kade Hensley kick) (Drive: 5 plays, 80 yards, 1:52; Coastal Carolina 24-3)
- (2:20) CCU – Braydon Bennett 2-yard run (Kade Hensley kick) (Drive: 9 plays, 48 yards, 4:49; Coastal Carolina 31-3)
- (0:19) JVST – Cole Fuller 1-yard run (Garrison Rippa kick) (Drive: 9 plays, 75 yards, 2:01; Coastal Carolina 31-10)

Third quarter

- (9:11) CCU – Braydon Bennett 2-yard run (Kade Hensley kick) (Drive: 9 plays, 79 yards, 4:39; Coastal Carolina 38-10)
- (3:13) CCU – Kade Hensley 39-yard field goal (Drive: 4 plays, 0 yards, 2:13; Coastal Carolina 41-10)

Fourth quarter

- (13:10) JVST – Garrison Rippa 26-yard field goal (Drive: 14 plays, 67 yards, 5:03; Coastal Carolina 41-13)
- (8:34) CCU – Jameson Tucker 37-yard pass from Ethan Vasko (Kade Hensley kick) (Drive: 9 plays, 75 yards, 4:36; Coastal Carolina 48-13)
- (8:03) JVST – Michael Pettway 92-yard pass from Tyler Huff (Garrison Rippa kick) (Drive: 1 play, 92 yards, 0:24; Coastal Carolina 48-20)
- (2:18) CCU – Senika McKie 9-yard pass from Noah Kim (Kade Hensley kick) (Drive: 9 plays, 75 yards, 5:45; Coastal Carolina 55-20)
- (1:06) JVST – Tre Stewart 38-yard run (Garrison Rippa kick) (Drive: 4 plays, 75 yards, 1:12; Coastal Carolina 55-27)

Statistics	CCU	JVST
First downs	25	16
Total yards	76–555	57–357
Rushing yards	56–297	30–123
Passing yards	258	234
Passing: Comp–Att–Int	13–20–1	14–27–2
Time of possession	39:51	20:09

Team	Category	Player	Statistics
Coastal Carolina	Passing	Ethan Vasko	12/19, 249 yards, 2 TD, INT
Coastal Carolina	Rushing	Ja'Vin Simpkins	12 carries, 80 yards
Coastal Carolina	Receiving	Tray Taylor	3 receptions, 98 yards, TD
Jacksonville State	Passing	Tyler Huff	7/14, 173 yards, TD, 2 INT
Jacksonville State	Rushing	Tre Stewart	4 carries, 62 yards, TD
Jacksonville State	Receiving	Michael Pettway	1 reception, 92 yards, TD

=== vs. No. 13 (FCS) William & Mary ===
Game Two – No. 13 (FCS) William & Mary Tribe (1–0) at Coastal Carolina Chanticleers (1–0) – Game summary

Quarter	1	2	3	4	Total
No. 13 (FCS) Tribe	0	7	7	7	21
Chanticleers	14	13	10	3	40

at Brooks Stadium • Conway, SC

- Date: Saturday September 7, 2024
- Game time: 7:00 p.m.
- Game weather: Sunny
- Game attendance: 19,294
- Referee: Steven Robinson
- TV announcers (ESPN+): Jeff McCarragher (play-by-play) and Nate Ross (analyst)

Game information

First quarter

- (12:02) CCU – Braydon Bennett 4-yard run, Kade Hensley kick (Drive: 5 plays, 57 yards, 1:31; Coastal Carolina 7–0)
- (3:11) CCU – Christian Washington 1-yard run, Kade Hensley kick (Drive: 9 plays, 99 yards, 4:28; Coastal Carolina 14–0)

Second quarter

- (12:52) CCU – Christian Washington 4-yard run, Kade Hensley kick (Drive: 9 plays, 81 yards, 3:18; Coastal Carolina 21–0)
- (11:30) W&M – DreSean Kendrick 62-yard pass from Darius Wilson, Eric Bernstein kick (Drive: 4 plays, 75 yards, 1:22; Coastal Carolina 21–7)
- (10:21) CCU – Kade Hensley 43-yard field goal (Drive: 5 plays, 48 yards, 1:09; Coastal Carolina 24–7)
- (0:00) CCU – Kade Hensley 33-yard field goal (Drive: 4 plays, 7 yards, 0:51; Coastal Carolina 27–7)

Third quarter

- (12:21) CCU – Kade Hensley 49-yard field goal (Drive: 9 plays, 38 yards, 2:32; Coastal Carolina 30–7)
- (11:37) CCU – Matthew McDoom 24-yard fumble recovery, Kade Hensley kick (Coastal Carolina 37–7)
- (6:12) W&M – Darius Wilson 19-yard run, Eric Bernstein kick (Drive: 4 plays, 30 yards, 2:01; Coastal Carolina 37–14)

Fourth quarter

- (4:17) CCU – Kade Hensley 49-yard field goal (Drive: 9 plays, 45 yards, 4:12; Coastal Carolina 40–14)
- (0:06) W&M – Tyler Hughes 4-yard run, Eric Bernstein kick (Drive: 15 plays, 75 yards, 4:11; Coastal Carolina 40–21)

Statistics	W&M	CCU
First downs	19	23
Total yards	319	456
Rushing yards	142	277
Passing yards	177	179
Passing: Comp–Att–Int	15–29–0	10–26–0
Time of possession	29:41	30:19

Team	Category	Player	Statistics
William & Mary	Passing	Darius Wilson	11/21, 165 yards, TD
William & Mary	Rushing	Tyler Hughes	54 yards, TD
William & Mary	Receiving	DreSean Kendrick	2 receptions, 74 yards, TD
Coastal Carolina	Passing	Ethan Vasko	8/23, 160 yards
Coastal Carolina	Rushing	Christian Washington	100 yards, 2 TD
Coastal Carolina	Receiving	Cameron Wright	3 receptions, 39 yards

=== at Temple ===
Game Three – Coastal Carolina Chanticleers (2–0) at Temple Owls (0–2) – Game summary

Quarter	1	2	3	4	Total
Chanticleers	14	7	7	0	28
Owls	3	7	7	3	20

at Lincoln Financial Field • Philadelphia, PA

- Date: Saturday September 14, 2024
- Game time: 2:00 p.m.
- Game weather: Sunny • Temperature: 85 °F (29 °C) • Wind: E at 8 miles per hour (13 km/h)
- Game attendance: 13,945
- Referee: Tim Rich
- TV announcers (ESPN+): Richard Cross (play-by-play) and Barrett Brooks (analyst)

Game information

First quarter

- (4:14) CCU – Christian Washington 15 yard run, Kade Hensley kick (Drive: 11 plays, 63 yards, 4:46; Coastal Carolina 7–0)
- (3:30) CCU – Xamarion Gordon 29 yard interception return, Kade Hensley kick (Coastal Carolina 14–0)
- (1:37) TEM – Maddux Trujillo 54 yard field goal (Drive: 5 plays, 39 yards, 1:53; Coastal Carolina 14–3)

Second quarter

- (8:25) CCU – Cameron Wright 8 yard pass from Ethan Vasko, Kade Hensley kick (Drive: 2 plays, 11 yards, 0:43; Coastal Carolina 21–3)
- (4:37) TEM – John Adams 15 yard pass from Evan Simon, Maddux Trujillo kick (Drive: 8 plays, 75 yards, 3:48; Coastal Carolina 21–10)

Third quarter

- (10:26) TEM – Dante Wright 2 yard pass from Evan Simon, Maddux Trujillo kick (Drive: 7 plays, 53 yards, 3:44; Coastal Carolina 21–17)
- (3:48) CCU – Christian Washington 5 yard run, Kade Hensley kick (Drive: 13 plays, 75 yards, 6:38; Coastal Carolina 28–17)

Fourth quarter

- (12:58) TEM – Maddux Trujillo 37 yard field goal (Drive: 11 plays, 54 yards, 5:44; Coastal Carolina 28–20)

Statistics	CCU	TEM
First downs	19	15
Total yards	287	314
Rushing yards	184	129
Passing yards	103	185
Passing: Comp–Att–Int	15–21–0	17–25–1
Time of possession	29:41	30:19

Team	Category	Player	Statistics
Coastal Carolina	Passing	Ethan Vasko	15/21, 103 yards, 1 TD
Coastal Carolina	Rushing	Ethan Vasko	16 carries, 92 yards
Coastal Carolina	Receiving	Jameson Tucker	4 receptions, 35 yards
Temple	Passing	Evan Simon	17/25, 185 yards, 2 TD, 1 INT
Temple	Rushing	Antwain Littleton II	14 carries, 74 yards
Temple	Receiving	Dante Wright	9 receptions, 99 yards, 1 TD

=== vs. Virginia ===
Game Four – Virginia Cavaliers (2–1) at Coastal Carolina Chanticleers (3–0) – Game summary

Quarter	1	2	3	4	Total
Cavaliers	14	13	10	6	43
Chanticleers	3	7	7	7	24

at Brooks Stadium • Conway, SC

- Date: Saturday September 21, 2024
- Game time: 2:00 p.m.
- Game weather: Sunny
- Game attendance: 22,104
- Referee: Nate Black
- TV announcers (ESPN+): Jeff McCarragher (play-by-play), Nate Ross (analyst) and Joanne Bethea (sideline)

Game information

First quarter

- (13:36) UVA – Malachi Fields 7-yard pass from Anthony Colandrea, Will Bettridge kick (Drive: 3 plays, 13 yards, 1:20; Virginia 7–0)
- (10:11) CCU – Kade Hensley 30-yard field goal (Drive: 9 plays, 52 yards, 3:25; Virginia 7–3)
- (4:47) UVA – Grady Brosterhous 5-yard run, Will Bettridge kick (Drive: 3 plays, 35 yards, 1:22; Virginia 14–3)

Second quarter

- (11:14) UVA – Will Bettridge 22-yard field goal (Drive: 14 plays, 64 yards, 7:45; Virginia 17–3)
- (7:26) CCU – Jameson Tucker 29-yard pass from Ethan Vasko, Kade Hensley kick (Drive: 8 plays, 90 yards, 3:34; Virginia 17–10)
- (2:59) UVA – Grady Brosterhous 1-yard run, Will Bettridge kick (Drive: 10 plays, 75 yards, 4:27; Virginia 24–10)
- (0:00) UVA – Will Bettridge 47-yard field goal (Drive: 10 plays, 28 yards, 1:46; Virginia 27–10)

Third quarter

- (12:27) UVA – Will Bettridge 45-yard field goal (Drive: 6 plays, 47 yards, 2:33; Virginia 30–10)
- (6:26) UVA – Kobe Pace 1-yard run, Will Bettridge kick (Drive: 5 plays, 92 yards, 2:50; Virginia 37–10)
- (4:21) CCU – Ethan Vasko 3-yard run, Kade Hensley kick (Drive: 4 plays, 75 yards, 2:05; Virginia 37–17)

Fourth quarter

- (12:12) UVA – Malachi Fields 37-yard pass from Anthony Colandrea, Will Bettridge kick (Drive: 6 plays, 65 yards, 2:36; Virginia 43–17)
- (9:06) CCU – Bryson Graves 15-yard pass from Noah Kim, Kade Hensley kick (Drive: 8 plays, 75 yards, 3:06; Virginia 43–24)

Statistics	UVA	CCU
First downs	25	13
Total yards	525	384
Rushing yards	384	82
Passing yards	141	302
Passing: Comp–Att–Int	15–23–0	16–33–1
Time of possession	37:09	22:51

Team	Category	Player	Statistics
Virginia	Passing	Anthony Colandrea	13/20, 131 yards, 2 TD
Virginia	Rushing	Xavier Brown	9 carries, 171 yards
Virginia	Receiving	Malachi Fields	4 receptions, 65 yards, 2 TD
Coastal Carolina	Passing	Ethan Vasko	10/21, 222 yards, TD, INT
Coastal Carolina	Rushing	Ethan Vasko	8 carries, 24 yards, TD
Coastal Carolina	Receiving	Tray Taylor	3 receptions, 70 yards

=== vs. Old Dominion ===
Game Five – Old Dominion Monarchs (1–3) at Coastal Carolina Chanticleers (3–1) – Game summary

Quarter	1	2	3	4	Total
Monarchs	7	10	7	13	37
Chanticleers	7	14	14	10	45

at Brooks Stadium • Conway, SC

- Date: Saturday October 5, 2024
- Game time: 7:00 p.m.
- Game weather: Sunny
- Game attendance: 18,552
- Referee: Trennis Livingston
- TV announcers (ESPN+): Jeff McCarragher (play-by-play), Nate Ross (analyst) and Joanne Bethea (sideline)

Game information

First quarter

- (3:39) ODU – Bryce Duke 10-yard pass from Colton Joseph, Ethan Sanchez kick (Drive: 12 plays, 86 yards, 4:42; Old Dominion 7–0)
- (0:45) CCU – Cane Berrong 8-yard pass from Ethan Vasko, Kade Hensley kick (Drive: 5 plays, 75 yards, 2:54; Tied 7–7)

Second quarter

- (9:58) ODU – Ethan Sanchez 26-yard field goal (Drive: 10 plays, 40 yards, 5:43; Old Dominion 10–7)
- (4:26) ODU – Isiah Paige 55-yard pass from Colton Joseph, Ethan Sanchez kick (Drive: 5 plays, 68 yards, 1:47; Old Dominion 17–7)
- (2:15) CCU – Cameron Wright 12-yard pass from Ethan Vasko, Kade Hensley kick (Drive: 3 plays, 75 yards, 2:11; Old Dominion 17–14)
- (1:48) CCU – Juan Powell 23-yard fumble recovery, Kade Hensley kick (Coastal Carolina 21–17)

Third quarter

- (13:02) CCU – Braydon Bennett 9-yard run, Kade Hensley kick (Drive: 5 plays, 80 yards, 1:53; Coastal Carolina 28–17)
- (3:08) CCU – Braydon Bennett 4-yard run, Kade Hensley kick (Drive: 8 plays, 29 yards, 3:50; Coastal Carolina 35–17)
- (0:54) ODU – Diante Vines 40-yard pass from Colton Joseph, Ethan Sanchez kick (Drive: 7 plays, 65 yards, 2:14; Coastal Carolina 35–24)

Fourth quarter

- (10:44) ODU – Devin Roche 1-yard run (Drive: 9 plays, 78 yards, 3:03; Coastal Carolina 35–30)
- (7:56) CCU – Braydon Bennett 37-yard pass from Ethan Vasko, Kade Hensley kick (Drive: 7 plays, 75 yards, 2:48; Coastal Carolina 42–30)
- (2:47) CCU – Kade Hensley 46-yard field goal (Drive: 10 plays, 33 yards, 4:21; Coastal Carolina 45–30)
- (0:29) ODU – Colton Joseph 1-yard run, Ethan Sanchez kick (Drive: 12 plays, 75 yards, 2:18; Coastal Carolina 45–37)

Statistics	ODU	CCU
First downs	25	18
Total yards	462	515
Rushing yards	200	148
Passing yards	262	367
Passing: Comp–Att–Int	22–40–1	19–26–0
Time of possession	25:59	34:01

Team	Category	Player	Statistics
Old Dominion	Passing	Colton Joseph	22/40, 262 yards, 3 TD, INT
Old Dominion	Rushing	Devin Roche	12 carries, 86 yards, TD
Old Dominion	Receiving	Isiah Page	8 receptions, 81 yards, TD
Coastal Carolina	Passing	Ethan Vasko	19/26, 367 yards, 3 TD
Coastal Carolina	Rushing	Christian Washington	8 carries, 89 yards
Coastal Carolina	Receiving	Cameron Wright	4 receptions, 148 yards, TD

=== at James Madison ===
Game Six – Coastal Carolina Chanticleers (4–1) at James Madison Dukes (4–1) – Game summary

Quarter	1	2	3	4	Total
Chanticleers	7	0	0	0	7
Dukes	7	22	7	3	39

at Bridgeforth Stadium • Harrisonburg, VA

- Date: Thursday October 10, 2024
- Game time: 7:30 p.m.
- Game weather: Sunny • Temperature: 65 °F (18 °C) • Wind: S at 2 miles per hour (3.2 km/h)
- Game attendance: 25,622
- Referee: Ted Pitts
- TV announcers (ESPN2): Matt Barrie (play-by-play), Dan Mullen (analyst) and Harry Lyles Jr. (sideline)

Game information

First quarter

- (6:51) JMU – George Pettaway 9-yard pass from Alonza Barnett III, Max Lipinski kick (Drive: 11 plays, 67 yards, 5:51; James Madison 7–0)
- (4:30) CCU – Jameson Tucker 40-yard pass from Ethan Vasko, Kade Hensley kick (Drive: 5 plays, 73 yards, 2:15; Tied 7–7)

Second quarter

- (13:01) JMU – Taylor Thompson 25-yard pass from Alonza Barnett III, Josh Phifer pass (Drive: 4 plays, 77 yards, 1:20; James Madison 15–7)
- (11:51) JMU – Lloyd Summerall III 35-yard interception, Max Lipinski kick (James Madison 22–7)
- (6:47) JMU – Alonza Barnett III 5-yard run, Max Lipinski kick (Drive: 7 plays, 54 yards, 3:32; James Madison 29–7)

Third quarter

- (10:41) JMU – Dylan Williams 3-yard pass from Alonza Barnett III, Max Lipinski kick (Drive: 8 plays, 59 yards, 3:06; James Madison 36–7)

Fourth quarter

- (5:14) JMU – Max Lipinski 35-yard field goal (Drive: 9 plays, 41 yards, 6:31; James Madison 39–7)

Statistics	CCU	JMU
First downs	8	20
Total yards	181	421
Rushing yards	79	222
Passing yards	102	199
Passing: Comp–Att–Int	9–26–2	16–28–0
Time of possession	21:06	38:54

Team	Category	Player	Statistics
Coastal Carolina	Passing	Ethan Vasko	5/18, 84 yards, TD, 2 INT
Coastal Carolina	Rushing	Braydon Bennett	12 carries, 45 yards
Coastal Carolina	Receiving	Jameson Tucker	2 receptions, 44 yards, TD
James Madison	Passing	Alonza Barnett III	16/28, 199 yards, 3 TD
James Madison	Rushing	George Pettaway	13 carries, 89 yards
James Madison	Receiving	Taylor Thompson	2 receptions, 58 yards, TD

=== vs. Louisiana ===
Game Seven – Louisiana Ragin' Cajuns (5–1) at Coastal Carolina Chanticleers (4–2) – Game summary

Quarter	1	2	3	4	Total
Ragin' Cajuns	7	10	0	17	34
Chanticleers	0	14	3	7	24

at Brooks Stadium • Conway, SC

- Date: Saturday October 19, 2024
- Game time: 12:00 p.m.
- Game weather: Sunny
- Game attendance: 17,812
- Referee: Tim Barker
- TV announcers (ESPNU): Courtney Lyle (play-by-play) and Rene Ingoglia (analyst)

Game information

First quarter

- (4:09) LA – Lance LeGendre 33-yard pass from Ben Wooldridge, Kenneth Almendares kick (Drive: 7 plays, 98 yards, 3:53; Louisiana 7–0)

Second quarter

- (12:28) LA – Bill Davis 9-yard pass from Ben Wooldridge, Kenneth Almendares kick (Drive: 9 plays, 73 yards, 4:20; Louisiana 14–0)
- (8:50) CCU – Kendall Karr 11-yard pass from Noah Kim, Kade Hensley kick (Drive: 9 plays, 76 yards, 3:33; Louisiana 14–7)
- (3:11) LA – Kenneth Alemdares 45-yard field goal (Drive: 11 plays, 47 yards, 5:39; Louisiana 17–7)
- (0:44) CCU – Braydon Bennett 4-yard pass from Noah Kim, Kade Hensley kick (Drive: 10 plays, 90 yards, 2:22; Louisiana 17–14)

Third quarter

- (5:16) CCU – Kade Hensley 29-yard field goal (Drive: 10 plays, 90 yards, 2:22; Tied 17–17)

Fourth quarter

- (12:48) LA – Ben Wooldridge 1-yard run, Kenneth Almendares kick (Drive: 12 plays, 81 yards, 7:22; Louisiana 24–17)
- (10:52) CCU – Braydon Bennett 49-yard run, Kade Hensley kick (Drive: 4 plays, 73 yards, 1:52; Tied 24–24)
- (5:58) LA – Kenneth Almendares 38-yard field goal (Drive: 9 plays, 55 yards, 4:54; Louisiana 27–24)
- (2:34) LA – Terrance Carter 59-yard pass from Ben Wooldridge, Kenneth Almendares kick (Drive: 6 plays, 76 yards, 2:30; Louisiana 34–24)

Statistics	LA	CCU
First downs	26	19
Total yards	516	400
Rushing yards	143	208
Passing yards	373	192
Passing: Comp–Att–Int	27–36–0	19–35–0
Time of possession	38:32	21:28

Team	Category	Player	Statistics
Louisiana	Passing	Ben Wooldridge	27/36, 373 yards, 3 TD
Louisiana	Rushing	Bill Davis	19 carries, 110 yards
Louisiana	Receiving	Terrance Carter	7 receptions, 149 yards, TD
Coastal Carolina	Passing	Noah Kim	16/25, 182 yards, 2 TD
Coastal Carolina	Rushing	Braydon Bennett	13 carries, 132 yards, TD
Coastal Carolina	Receiving	Bryson Graves	3 receptions, 54 yards

=== at Troy ===
Game Eight – Coastal Carolina Chanticleers (4–3) at Troy Trojans (1–7) – Game summary

Quarter	1	2	3	4	Total
Chanticleers	7	0	17	0	24
Trojans	7	21	7	3	38

at Veterans Memorial Stadium, Troy, AL

- Date: Saturday November 2, 2024
- Game time: 4:00 p.m. EDT
- Game weather: Sunny • Temperature: 81 °F (27 °C) • Wind: NW 7 mph
- Game attendance: 24,223
- Referee: Jeremy Parker
- TV announcers (ESPN+): Will Kollmeyer (play-by-play), Ben Stanfield (analyst) and Junior Louissaint (sideline)

Game information

First Quarter

- (5:02) TROY – Gerald Green 1-yard run, Scott Taylor Renfroe kick (Drive: 7 plays, 99 yards, 3:45; Troy 7–0)
- (1:12) CCU – Ethan Vasko 11-yard run, Kade Hensley kick (Drive: 1 play, 11 yards, 0:11; Tied 7–7)

Second Quarter

- (10:42) TROY – Devonte Ross 3-yard pass from Matthew Caldwell, Scott Taylor Renfroe kick (Drive: 11 plays, 82 yards, 5:24; Troy 14–7)
- (4:57) TROY – Gerald Green 83-yard pass from Matthew Caldwell, Scott Taylor Renfroe kick (Drive: 3 plays, 89 yards, 1:20; Troy 21–7)
- (0:27) TROY – Matthew Caldwell 1-yard run, Scott Taylor Renfroe kick (Drive: 9 plays, 64 yards, 3:42; Troy 28–7)

Third Quarter

- (9:43) CCU – Kade Hensley 28-yard field goal (Drive: 12 plays, 73 yards, 5:12; Troy 28–10)
- (9:22) CCU – Braydon Bennett 21-yard run, Kade Hensley kick (Drive: 2 plays, 21 yards, 0:13; Troy 28–17)
- (6:22) TROY – Damien Taylor 41-yard run, Scott Taylor Renfroe kick (Drive: 7 plays, 70 yards, 3:00; Troy 35–17)
- (2:20) CCU – Jameson Tucker 38-yard pass from Ethan Vasko, Kade Hensley kick (Drive: 11 plays, 75 yards, 4:02; Troy 35–24)

Fourth Quarter

- (2:42) TROY – Scott Taylor Renfroe 36-yard field goal (Drive: 14 plays, 50 yards, 6:39; Troy 38–24)

Statistics	CCU	TROY
First downs	16	23
Total yards	313	511
Rushing yards	107	342
Passing yards	206	169
Passing: Comp–Att–Int	18–34–0	9–16–0
Time of possession	26:10	33:50

Team	Category	Player	Statistics
Coastal Carolina	Passing	Ethan Vasko	18/34, 206 yards, TD
Coastal Carolina	Rushing	Braydon Bennett	10 carries, 69 yards, TD
Coastal Carolina	Receiving	Jameson Tucker	6 receptions, 106 yards, TD
Troy	Passing	Matthew Caldwell	9/16, 169 yards, 2 TD
Troy	Rushing	Damien Taylor	28 carries, 190 yards, TD
Troy	Receiving	Gerald Green	1 reception, 83 yards, TD

=== Appalachian State ===
Game Nine – Appalachian State Mountaineers (4–4) at Coastal Carolina Chanticleers (4–4) – Game summary

Quarter	1	2	3	4	Total
Mountaineers	0	10	0	14	24
Chanticleers	14	3	14	7	38

at Brooks Stadium • Conway, SC

- Date: Thursday November 7, 2024
- Game time: 8:00 p.m.
- Game weather: Cloudy
- Game attendance: 19,415
- Referee: Ted Pitts
- TV announcers (ESPN): Matt Barrie (play-by-play), Dan Mullen (analyst) and Harry Lyles Jr. (sideline)

Game information

First quarter

- (10:40) CCU – Braydon Bennett 12-yard run, Kade Hensley kick (Drive: 7 plays, 68 yards, 4:14; Coastal Carolina 7–0)
- (3:03) CCU – Braydon Bennett 37-yard run, Kade Hensley kick (Drive: 6 plays, 68 yards, 3:28; Coastal Carolina 14–0)

Second quarter

- (13:25) CCU – Kade Hensley 29-yard field goal (Drive: 6 plays, 37 yards, 2:25; Coastal Carolina 17–0)
- (10:23) APP – Jackson Moore 38-yard field goal (Drive: 8 plays, 56 yards, 3:02; Coastal Carolina 17–3)
- (3:07) APP – Ahmani Marshall 2-yard run, Jackson Moore kick (Drive: 10 plays, 77 yards, 5:31; Coastal Carolina 17–10)

Third quarter

- (5:02) CCU – Braydon Bennett 2-yard run, Kade Hensley kick (Drive: 17 plays, 87 yards, 8:42; Coastal Carolina 24–10)
- (4:05) CCU – Ethan Vasko 1-yard run, Kade Hensley kick (Drive: 2 plays, 1 yard, 0:42; Coastal Carolina 31–10)

Fourth quarter

- (14:19) APP – Ahmani Marshall 2-yard run, Jackson Moore kick (Drive: 12 plays, 75 yards, 4:46; Coastal Carolina 31–17)
- (2:26) CCU – Jameson Tucker 6-yard pass from Ethan Vasko, Kade Hensley kick (Drive: 4 plays, 36 yards, 0:55; Coastal Carolina 38–17)
- (1:40) APP – Kaedin Robinson 25-yard pass from Joey Aguilar, Jackson Moore kick (Drive: 4 plays, 75 yards, 0:46; Coastal Carolina 38–24)

Statistics	APP	CCU
First downs	23	19
Total yards	376	353
Rushing yards	150	203
Passing yards	226	150
Passing: Comp–Att–Int	17–31–2	14–18–0
Time of possession	29:15	30:45

Team	Category	Player	Statistics
Appalachian State	Passing	Joey Aguilar	17/31, 226 yards, TD, 2 INT
Appalachian State	Rushing	Ahmani Marshall	28 carries, 124 yards, 2 TD
Appalachian State	Receiving	Kaedin Robinson	5 receptions, 76 yards, TD
Coastal Carolina	Passing	Ethan Vasko	14/18, 150 yards, TD
Coastal Carolina	Rushing	Braydon Bennett	9 carries, 88 yards, 3 TD
Coastal Carolina	Receiving	Braydon Bennett	4 receptions, 33 yards

=== at Marshall ===
Game Ten – Coastal Carolina Chanticleers (5–4) at Marshall Thundering Herd (6–3) – Game summary

Quarter	1	2	3	4	Total
Chanticleers	7	0	0	12	19
Thundering Herd	3	14	7	7	31

at Joan C. Edwards Stadium • Huntington, WV

- Date: Saturday November 16, 2024
- Game time: 1:00 p.m.
- Game weather: Sunny
- Game attendance: 24,175
- Referee: Trennis Livingston
- TV announcers (ESPN+): Mark Martin (play-by-play) and Keith Morehouse (analyst)

Game information

First quarter

- (11:04) CCU – Braydon Bennett 4 yard run, Kade Hensley kick (Drive: 9 plays, 75 yards, 3:56; Coastal Carolina 7–0)
- (2:47) MRSH – Nathan Totten 39 yard field goal (Drive: 9 plays, 53 yards, 3:42; Coastal Carolina 7–3)

Second quarter

- (9:06) MRSH – Charles Montgomery 14 yard pass from Braylon Braxton, Nathan Totten kick (Drive: 9 plays, 37 yards, 5:56; Marshall 10–7)
- (3:47) MRSH – Jacobie Henderson 65 yard blocked field goal return, Nathan Totten kick (Marshall 17–7)

Third quarter

- (2:02) MRSH – Christian Fitzpatrick 7 yard pass from Braylon Braxton, Nathan Totten kick (Drive: 10 plays, 92 yards, 4:14; Marshall 24–7)

Fourth quarter

- (13:44) CCU – Kade Hensley 46 yard field goal (Drive: 9 plays, 46 yards, 3:18; Marshall 24–10)
- (11:55) MRSH – Toby Payne 2 yard pass from Braylon Braxton, Nathan Totten kick (Drive: 1 play, 2 yards, 0:03; Marshall 31–10)
- (11:04) CCU – Jameson Tucker 47 yard pass from Ethan Vasko, Kade Hensley kick (Drive: 3 plays, 75 yards, 0:51; Marshall 31–17)
- (6:56) CCU – TEAM –32 yard safety (Marshall 31–19)

Statistics	CCU	MRSH
First downs	20	17
Total yards	391	254
Rushing yards	124	35
Passing yards	267	219
Passing: Comp–Att–Int	21–40–1	20–31–0
Time of possession	30:52	29:08

Team	Category	Player	Statistics
Coastal Carolina	Passing	Ethan Vasko	21/39, 267 yards, TD, INT
Coastal Carolina	Rushing	Braydon Bennett	19 carries, 67 yards, TD
Coastal Carolina	Receiving	Bryson Graves	6 receptions, 87 yards
Marshall	Passing	Braylon Braxton	21/30, 219 yards, 3 TD
Marshall	Rushing	Jordan Houston	9 carries, 33 yards
Marshall	Receiving	Carl Chester	4 receptions, 69 yards

=== Georgia Southern ===
Game Eleven – Georgia Southern Eagles (6–4) at Coastal Carolina Chanticleers (5–5) – Game summary

Quarter	1	2	3	4	Total
Eagles	10	3	0	13	26
Chanticleers	3	0	3	0	6

at Brooks Stadium • Conway, SC

- Date: Saturday November 23, 2024
- Game time: 3:30 p.m.
- Game weather: Sunny • Temperature: 60 °F (16 °C)
- Game attendance: 14,556
- Referee: Ted Pitts
- TV announcers (ESPN+): Jeff McCarragher (play-by-play) and Nate Ross (analyst)

Game information

First quarter

- (8:17) GASO – Gavin Stewart 22-yard field goal (Drive: 15 plays, 71 yards, 6:43; Georgia Southern 3–0)
- (6:55) GASO – Marcus Sanders Jr. 30-yard pass from JC French, Gavin Stewart kick (Drive: 2 plays, 55 yards, 0:30; Georgia Southern 10–0)
- (2:46) CCU – Kade Hensley 39-yard field goal (Drive: 9 plays, 54 yards, 4:09; Georgia Southern 10–3)

Second quarter

- (1:29) GASO – Gavin Stewart 27-yard field goal (Drive: 9 plays, 32 yards, 4:18; Georgia Southern 13–3)

Third quarter

- (12:43) CCU – Kade Hensley 24-yard field goal (Drive: 6 plays, 69 yards, 2:17; Georgia Southern 13–6)

Fourth quarter

- (14:56) GASO – Gavin Stewart 36-yard field goal (Drive: 16 plays, 72 yards, 7:09; Georgia Southern 16–6)
- (5:56) GASO – Jalen White 2-yard run, Gavin Stewart kick (Drive: 2 plays, 2 yards, 0:09; Georgia Southern 23–6)
- (3:18) GASO – Gavin Stewart 39-yard field goal (Drive: 4 plays, 4 yards, 2:14; Georgia Southern 26–6)

Statistics	GASO	CCU
First downs	21	12
Total yards	384	280
Rushing yards	90	163
Passing yards	294	117
Passing: Comp–Att–Int	25–38–0	11–32–3
Time of possession	38:45	21:15

Team	Category	Player	Statistics
Georgia Southern	Passing	JC French	25/38, 294 yards, TD
Georgia Southern	Rushing	Jalen White	13 carries, 46 yards, TD
Georgia Southern	Receiving	Derwin Burgess Jr.	8 receptions, 98 yards
Coastal Carolina	Passing	Ethan Vasko	10/25, 92 yards, 2 INT
Coastal Carolina	Rushing	Braydon Bennett	16 carries, 138 yards
Coastal Carolina	Receiving	Senika McKie	5 receptions, 78 yards

=== at Georgia State ===
Game Twelve – Coastal Carolina Chanticleers (5–6) at Georgia State Panthers (3–8) – Game summary

Quarter	1	2	3	4	Total
Chanticleers	7	10	14	17	48
Panthers	0	10	9	8	27

at Center Parc Stadium • Atlanta, GA

- Date: Saturday November 30, 2024
- Game time: 2:00 p.m.
- Game weather: Sunny
- Game attendance: 12,606
- Referee: Marshall Lewis
- TV: ESPN+

Game information

First quarter

- (8:15) CCU – Senika McKie 10-yard pass from Ethan Vasko, Kade Hensley kick (Drive: 6 plays, 25 yards, 3:09; Coastal Carolina 7–0)

Second quarter

- (14:07) GAST – Liam Rickman 28-yard field goal (Drive: 15 plays, 83 yards, 6:27; Coastal Carolina 7–3)
- (8:38) GAST – Freddie Brock 19-yard rush, Liam Rickman kick (Drive: 7 plays, 70 yards, 3:44; Georgia State 10–7)
- (4:16) CCU – Zach Courtney 5-yard pass from Ethan Vasko, Kade Hensley kick (Drive: 9 plays, 75 yards, 4:22; Coastal Carolina 14–10)
- (0:01) CCU – Kade Hensley 43-yard field goal (Drive: 12 plays, 64 yards, 1:39; Coastal Carolina 17–10)

Third quarter

- (10:56) CCU – Christian Washington 18-yard rush, Kade Hensley kick (Drive: 5 plays, 40 yards, 2:28; Coastal Carolina 24–10)
- (7:06) GAST – Liam Rickman 30-yard field goal (Drive: 10 plays, 58 yards, 3:44; Coastal Carolina 24–13)
- (2:44) CCU – Senika McKie 31-yard pass from Ethan Vasko, Kade Hensley kick (Drive: 9 plays, 75 yards, 4:22; Coastal Carolina 31–13)
- (0:25) GAST – Freddie Brock 1-yard rush, Two-point pass conversion attempt failed (Drive: 5 plays, 76 yards, 2:12; Coastal Carolina 31–19)

Fourth quarter

- (9:50) CCU – Ethan Vasko 10-yard rush, Kade Hensley kick (Drive: 10 plays, 78 yards, 5:34; Coastal Carolina 38–19)
- (8:33) CCU – Kade Hensley 23-yard field goal (Drive: 4 plays, 2 yards, 0:49; Coastal Carolina 41–19)
- (7:13) CCU – Tobias Fletcher 29-yard interception returned, Kade Hensley kick (Drive: 0 plays, 0 yards, 0:00; Coastal Carolina 48–19)
- (4:36) GAST – Dorian Fleming 6-yard pass from Kyle Lowe, Kyle Lowe two-point pass conversion to Ted Hurst (Drive: 7 plays, 75 yards, 2:37; Coastal Carolina 48–27)

Statistics	CCU	GAST
First downs	27	19
Total yards	475	428
Rushing yards	275	202
Passing yards	200	226
Passing: Comp–Att–Int	13-20-2	17-32-4
Time of possession	32:43	27:17

Team	Category	Player	Statistics
Coastal Carolina	Passing	Ethan Vasko	13/17, 200 yards, 3 TDs, 1 INT
Coastal Carolina	Rushing	Christian Washington	20 carries, 124 yards, 1 TD
Coastal Carolina	Receiving	Senika McKie	5 receptions, 81 yards, 2 TDs
Georgia State	Passing	Christian Veilleux	15/26, 205 yards, 4 INTs
Georgia State	Rushing	Freddie Brock	14 carries, 71 yards, 2 TDs
Georgia State	Receiving	Ted Hurst	8 receptions, 131 yards

=== UTSA (Myrtle Beach Bowl) ===
2024 Myrtle Beach Bowl
UTSA Roadrunners (6-6, 4-4) at Coastal Carolina Chanticleers (6-6, 3-5)

Quarter	1	2	3	4	Total
Roadrunners	0	21	6	17	44
Chanticleers	0	0	0	15	15

at Brooks Stadium, Conway South Carolina

- Date: December 23rd, 2024
- Game time: 11:00 a.m. EST/8:00 a.m. PST
- TV: ESPN

Game information

First Quarter
Second Quarter
Third Quarter
Fourth Quarter

Win Probability

Line

Over/Under

Statistics	UTSA	CCU
First downs		
Total yards		
Rushing yards		
Passing yards		
Passing: Comp–Att–Int		
Time of possession		

Team	Category	Player	Statistics
UTSA	Passing		
UTSA	Rushing		
UTSA	Receiving		
Coastal Carolina	Passing		
Coastal Carolina	Rushing		
Coastal Carolina	Receiving		
