= Tate Rodemaker =

American football quarterback (born 2001)

No. 18
- Position: Quarterback

Personal information
- Born: April 30, 2001 (age 25); Peach County, Georgia, U.S.
- Listed height: 6 ft 4 in (1.93 m)
- Listed weight: 195 lb (88 kg)

Career information
- High school: Valdosta (Valdosta, Georgia)
- College: Florida State (2020–2023); Southern Miss (2024)
- Stats at ESPN

Tate Rodemaker (born April 30, 2001) is an American former college football quarterback. He played for the Southern Miss Golden Eagles and the Florida State Seminoles.

== Early life ==
Rodemaker attended Valdosta High School in Valdosta, Georgia, where he passed for 6,811 yards and 74 touchdowns. He originally committed to play college football for the South Florida Bulls. However, Rodemaker decided to flip his commitment to play for the Florida State Seminoles.

== College career ==
=== Florida State ===
Rodemaker made his first career start in the 2020 season versus Jacksonville State, where he completed eight of 12 passes for 58 yards and an interception and he was benched for Jordan Travis in the 41–24. He finished his freshman season in 2020, going 17 for 29 for 130 yards and three interceptions. In 2021, Rodemaker appeared in one game where he completed one of two passes for seven yards. In week 3 of the 2022 season, Rodemaker replaced an injured Travis and threw for 109 yards and two touchdowns in a 35–31 comeback win over Louisville. He finished the 2022 season completing 18 of 31 passing attempts for 254 yards and two touchdowns with two interceptions. In week 12 of the 2023 season, Rodemaker replaced an injured Travis and completed 13 of 23 pass attempts for 217 yards and two touchdowns in a win over North Alabama. After the North Alabama game, Rodemaker took over as the Seminoles starting quarterback after Travis suffered a season-ending injury. Rodemaker suffered a concussion against Florida that forced Brock Glenn to fill in for the ACC Championship Game.

On December 25, 2023, Rodemaker announced that he would be entering the transfer portal and would skip the 2023 Orange Bowl.

=== Southern Miss ===
On January 6, 2024, Rodemaker announced that he would transfer to Southern Miss. He was named as the starting quarterback for the 2024 season opener.

On December 5, 2024, Rodemaker announced that he would enter the transfer portal for the second time.

=== Western Carolina ===
On May 16, 2025, Rodemaker announced that he would transfer to Western Carolina. However, he was not on Western Carolina's 2025 roster.

=== Statistics ===
Year	Team	Games			Passing								Rushing			
Year	Team	GP	GS	Record	Cmp	Att	Pct	Yds	Avg	TD	Int	Rtg	Att	Yds	Avg	TD
2020	Florida State	4	1	1–0	17	29	58.6	130	4.5	0	3	75.6	8	-13	-1.6	0
2021	Florida State	3	0	—	1	2	50.0	7	3.5	0	0	79.4	0	0	0.0	0
2022	Florida State	7	0	—	18	31	58.1	254	8.2	2	2	135.3	10	14	1.4	0
2023	Florida State	9	1	1–0	32	56	57.1	510	9.1	5	0	163.1	9	-18	-2.0	0
2024	Southern Miss	9	7	1–6	98	164	59.8	985	6.0	7	7	115.8	26	-90	-3.5	0
Career		32	9	3−6	166	282	58.9	1,886	6.7	14	12	122.9	53	-107	-2.0	0
