= 2024 Marshall Thundering Herd football team =

American college football season

2024 Marshall Thundering Herd football

Sun Belt champion Sun Belt East Division champion

Sun Belt Championship, W 31–3 at Louisiana
- Conference: Sun Belt Conference
- East Division
- Record: 10–3 (7–1 Sun Belt)
- Head coach: Charles Huff (4th season)
- Offensive coordinator: Seth Doege (1st season)
- Offensive scheme: Spread
- Defensive coordinator: Jason Semore (2nd season)
- Base defense: Multiple
- Home stadium: Joan C. Edwards Stadium

Uniform
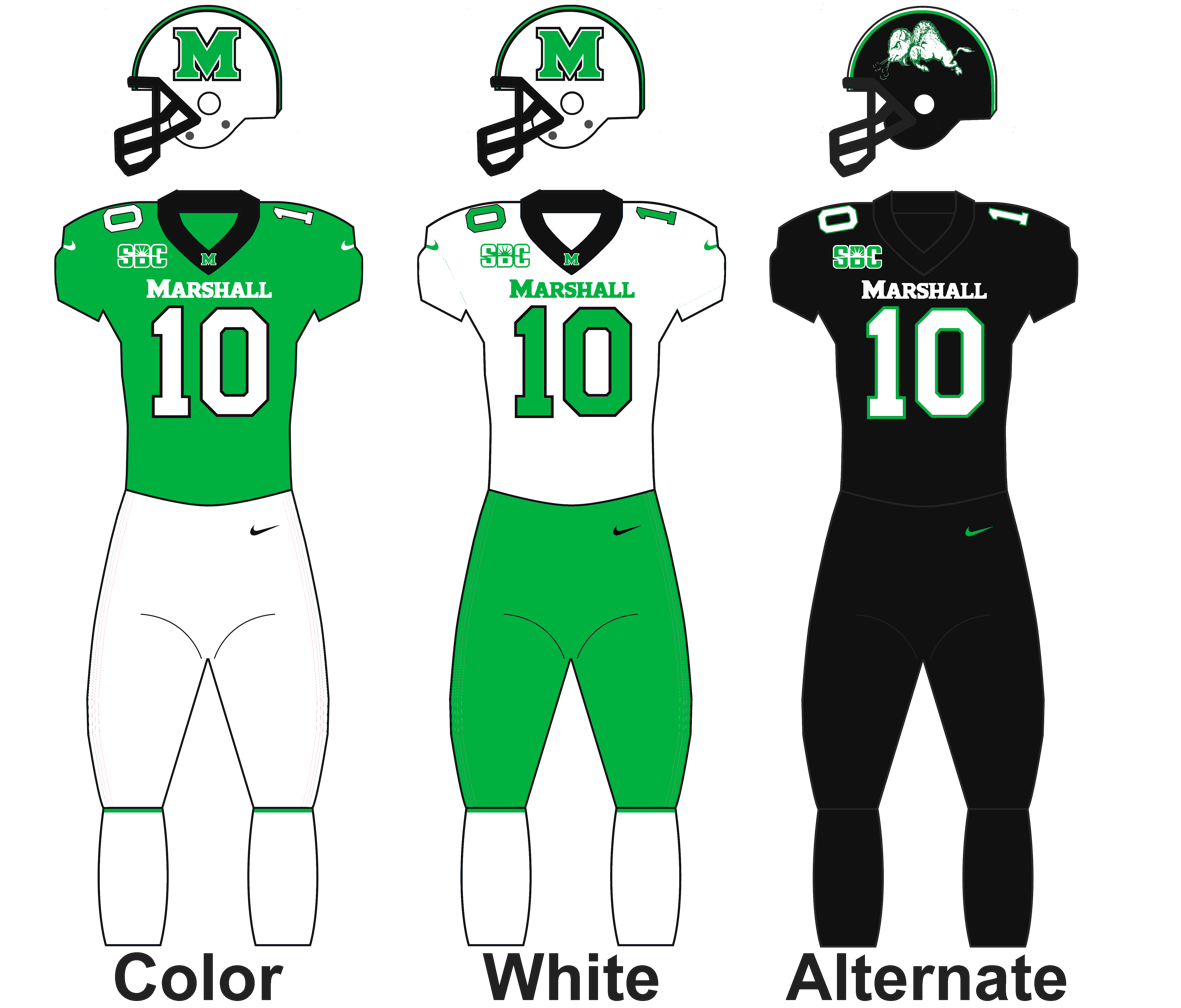

2024 Sun Belt Conference football standings
| | Conf. | | | Overall |
| Team | W | | L | W | | L |
|---|---|---|---|---|---|---|
East Division
| Marshall xy$ | 7 | – | 1 | 10 | – | 3 |
| Georgia Southern | 6 | – | 2 | 8 | – | 5 |
| James Madison | 4 | – | 4 | 9 | – | 4 |
| Old Dominion | 4 | – | 4 | 5 | – | 7 |
| Coastal Carolina | 3 | – | 5 | 6 | – | 7 |
| Appalachian State | 3 | – | 5 | 5 | – | 6 |
| Georgia State | 1 | – | 7 | 3 | – | 9 |
West Division
| Louisiana xy | 7 | – | 1 | 10 | – | 4 |
| Texas State | 5 | – | 3 | 8 | – | 5 |
| Arkansas State | 5 | – | 3 | 8 | – | 5 |
| South Alabama | 5 | – | 3 | 7 | – | 6 |
| Louisiana–Monroe | 3 | – | 5 | 5 | – | 7 |
| Troy | 3 | – | 5 | 4 | – | 8 |
| Southern Miss | 0 | – | 8 | 1 | – | 11 |
Championship: Marshall 31, Louisiana 3
$ – Conference champion; x – Division champion/co-champions; y – Championship game participant

The 2024 Marshall Thundering Herd football team represented Marshall University in the Sun Belt Conference's East Division during the 2024 NCAA Division I FBS football season. The Thundering Herd are led by Charles Huff in his fourth year as the head coach. The Thundering Herd played home games at the Joan C. Edwards Stadium, located in Huntington, West Virginia.

The Thundering Herd won their first conference title since 2014, and their first since moving to the Sun Belt.

On December 8, Charles Huff departed the program to be the head coach of Southern Miss. Huff left Marshall with a 32–20 record. That same day, Marshall announced the hiring of NC State defensive coordinator Tony Gibson as their next coach.

Following a win in the Sun Belt Championship Game, Marshall agreed to play Army in the Independence Bowl. However, on December 14, following the departure of head coach Huff and a mass exodus of starters into the NCAA transfer portal, the team withdrew from the bowl game. Marshall was subsequently fined $100,000 by the Sun Belt Conference for opting out of the bowl.

== Offseason ==
=== Coaching changes ===
On November 26, 2023, offensive coordinator Clint Trickett was fired by the Thundering Herd after serving two seasons in the position. On December 5, 2023, the Thundering Herd hired Seth Doege to be their offensive coordinator. He was previously the tight ends coach at Purdue.

== Preseason ==
=== Media poll ===
In the Sun Belt preseason coaches' poll, the Thundering Herd were picked to finish fifth place in the East division.

Offensive lineman Logan Osburn was named to the preseason All-Sun Belt second team offense.

== Schedule ==
The football schedule was announced March 1, 2024.

| Date | Time | Opponent | Site | TV | Result | Attendance |
|---|---|---|---|---|---|---|
| August 31 | 5:00 p.m. | Stony Brook* | Joan C. Edwards Stadium; Huntington, WV | ESPN+ | W 45–3 | 25,032 |
| September 7 | 4:30 p.m. | at Virginia Tech* | Lane Stadium; Blacksburg, VA | The CW | L 14–31 | 65,632 |
| September 21 | 12:00 p.m. | at No. 3 Ohio State* | Ohio Stadium; Columbus, OH (Big Noon Kickoff) | FOX | L 14–49 | 103,871 |
| September 28 | 3:30 p.m. | Western Michigan* | Joan C. Edwards Stadium; Huntington, WV | ESPN+ | W 27–20 | 18,723 |
| October 5 | 3:30 p.m. | Appalachian State^{†} | Joan C. Edwards Stadium; Huntington, WV (rivalry) | ESPN+ | W 52–37 | 28,023 |
| October 12 | 8:00 p.m. | at Georgia Southern | Paulson Stadium; Statesboro, GA | ESPNU | L 23–24 | 24,048 |
| October 17 | 7:00 p.m. | Georgia State | Joan C. Edwards Stadium; Huntington, WV | ESPN2 | W 35–20 | 20,703 |
| November 2 | 3:30 p.m. | Louisiana–Monroe | Joan C. Edwards Stadium; Huntington, WV | ESPN+ | W 28–23 | 21,478 |
| November 9 | 3:00 p.m. | at Southern Miss | M. M. Roberts Stadium; Hattiesburg, MS | ESPN+ | W 37–3 | 20,502 |
| November 16 | 1:00 p.m. | Coastal Carolina | Joan C. Edwards Stadium; Huntington, WV | ESPN+ | W 31–19 | 24,175 |
| November 23 | 7:30 p.m. | at Old Dominion | S.B. Ballard Stadium; Norfolk, VA (Oyster Bowl) | ESPNU | W 42–35 | 18,083 |
| November 30 | 8:00 p.m. | at James Madison | Bridgeforth Stadium; Harrisonburg, VA | ESPNU | W 35–33 ^{2OT} | 23,341 |
| December 7 | 7:30 p.m. | at Louisiana | Cajun Field; Lafayette, LA (Sun Belt Championship Game) | ESPN | W 31–3 | 20,067 |
*Non-conference game; ^{†}Homecoming; Rankings from AP Poll and CFP Rankings released prior to game; All times are in Eastern time

== Game summaries ==
=== vs Stony Brook (FCS) ===
Game One – Stony Brook Seawolves (FCS) (0–0) at Marshall Thundering Herd (0–0) – Game summary

| Quarter | 1 | 2 | 3 | 4 | Total |
|---|---|---|---|---|---|
| Seawolves (FCS) | 0 | 0 | 3 | 0 | 3 |
| Thundering Herd | 7 | 10 | 7 | 21 | 45 |

at Joan C. Edwards Stadium • Huntington, WV

- Date: Saturday, August 31, 2024
- Game time: 5:00 PM
- Game weather: Sunny • Temperature: 76 °F (24 °C)
- Game attendance: 25,032
- Referee: Jeremy Parker
- TV announcers (ESPN+): Mark Martin (play-by-play) and Carl Lee (analyst)

Game information

First quarter

- (2:33) MRSH – A. J. Turner 80 yard run, Rece Verhoff kick (Drive: 1 play, 80 yards, 0:11; Marshall 7–0)

Second quarter

- (4:17) MRSH – Rece Verhoff 45 yard field goal (Drive: 10 plays, 42 yards, 4:11; Marshall 10–0)
- (1:38) MRSH – Elijah Metcalf 9 yard pass from Stone Earle, Rece Verhoff kick (Drive: 4 plays, 43 yards, 0:31; Marshall 17–0)

Third quarter

- (11:49) MRSH – Elijah Metcalf 28 yard pass from Stone Earle, Rece Verhoff kick (Drive: 9 plays, 75 yards, 3:11; Marshall 24–0)
- (4:15) SB – Enda Kirby 39 yard field goal (Drive: 12 plays, 39 yards, 4:52; Marshall 24–3)

Fourth quarter

- (14:07) MRSH – Christian Fitzpatrick 67 yard pass from Braylon Braxton, Rece Verhoff kick (Drive: 2 plays, 75 yards, 0:41; Marshall 31–3)
- (10:14) MRSH – Carl Chester 7 yard pass from Braylon Braxton, Rece Verhoff kick (Drive: 7 plays, 61 yards, 2:58; Marshall 38–3)
- (3:45) MRSH – Bralon Brown 16 yard pass from Cole Pennington, Rece Verhoff kick (Drive: 9 plays, 86 yards, 3:39; Marshall 45–3)

| Statistics | STBK | MRSH |
|---|---|---|
| First downs | 15 | 27 |
| Plays–yards | 80–252 | 68–549 |
| Rushes–yards | 47–94 | 36–259 |
| Passing yards | 158 | 290 |
| Passing: Comp–Att–Int | 18–33–1 | 21–32–0 |
| Time of possession | 35:38 | 24:22 |

| Team | Category | Player | Statistics |
|---|---|---|---|
| Stony Brook | Passing | Malachi Marshall | 10/20, 96 yards, 1 INT |
| Stony Brook | Rushing | Roland Dempster | 13 carries, 37 yards |
| Stony Brook | Receiving | Jayce Freeman | 2 receptions, 58 yards |
| Marshall | Passing | Braylon Braxton | 7/11, 141 yards, 2 TD |
| Marshall | Rushing | A. J. Turner | 8 carries, 119 yards, 1 TD |
| Marshall | Receiving | Christian Fitzpatrick | 4 receptions, 97 yards, 1 TD |

=== at Virginia Tech ===
Game Two – Marshall Thundering Herd (1–0) at Virginia Tech Hokies (0–1) – Game summary

| Quarter | 1 | 2 | 3 | 4 | Total |
|---|---|---|---|---|---|
| Thundering Herd | 0 | 7 | 7 | 0 | 14 |
| Hokies | 7 | 3 | 14 | 7 | 31 |

at Lane Stadium • Blacksburg, VA

- Date: Saturday, September 7, 2024
- Game time: 4:30 PM
- Game weather: Sunny • Temperature: 70 °F (21 °C)
- Game attendance: 65,632
- Referee: Justin Elliot
- TV announcers (The CW): Thom Brennaman (play-by-play), Max Browne (analyst), and Treavor Scales (sideline)

Game information

First quarter

- (0:00) VT – Jaylin Lane 58 yard punt return, John Love kick (Virginia Tech 7–0)

Second quarter

- (6:22) VT – John Love 42 yard field goal (Drive: 8 plays, 10 yards, 4:24; Virginia Tech 10–0)
- (3:19) MRSH – Ethan Payne 2 yard run, Rece Verhoff kick (Drive: 1 play, 5 yards, 0:09; Virginia Tech 10–7)

Third quarter

- (8:02) VT – Bhayshul Tuten 1 yard run, John Love kick (Drive: 12 plays, 50 yards, 6:33; Virginia Tech 17–7)
- (7:16) MRSH – Christian Fitzpatrick 18 yard pass from Stone Earle, Rece Verhoff kick (Drive: 2 plays, 87 yards, 0:46; Virginia Tech 17–14)
- (4:15) VT – Kyron Drones 3 yard run, John Love kick (Drive: 6 plays, 65 yards, 3:01; Virginia Tech 24–14)

Fourth quarter

- (14:14) VT – Da'Quan Felton 5 yard pass from Kyron Drones, John Love kick (Drive: 6 plays, 56 yards, 2:45; Virginia Tech 31–14)

| Statistics | MRSH | VT |
|---|---|---|
| First downs | 12 | 20 |
| Plays–yards | 62–278 | 72–338 |
| Rushes–yards | 26–147 | 51–208 |
| Passing yards | 131 | 130 |
| Passing: Comp–Att–Int | 13–36–1 | 14–21–0 |
| Time of possession | 23:35 | 36:25 |

| Team | Category | Player | Statistics |
|---|---|---|---|
| Marshall | Passing | Stone Earle | 13/36, 131 yards, 1 TD, 1 INT |
| Marshall | Rushing | A.J. Turner | 6 carries, 103 yards |
| Marshall | Receiving | Christian Fitzpatrick | 4 receptions, 73 yards, 1 TD |
| Virginia Tech | Passing | Kyron Drones | 14/21, 130 yards, 1 TD |
| Virginia Tech | Rushing | Bhayshul Tuten | 22 carries, 120 yards, 1 TD |
| Virginia Tech | Receiving | Stephen Gosnell | 2 receptions, 54 yards |

=== at No. 3 Ohio State ===
Game Three – Marshall Thundering Herd (1–1) at No. 3 Ohio State Buckeyes (2–0) – Game summary

| Quarter | 1 | 2 | 3 | 4 | Total |
|---|---|---|---|---|---|
| Thundering Herd | 7 | 7 | 0 | 0 | 14 |
| No. 3 Buckeyes | 7 | 21 | 14 | 7 | 49 |

at Ohio Stadium • Columbus, OH

- Date: Saturday, September 21, 2024
- Game time: 12:00 p.m.
- Game weather: Sunny • Temperature: 85 °F (29 °C) • Wind: W 5 mph
- Game attendance: 103,871
- Referee: Bryan Banks
- TV announcers (FOX): Gus Johnson (play-by-play), Joel Klatt (analyst), and Jenny Taft (sideline reporter)

Game information

First quarter

- (8:14) MRSH– Ethan Payne 1-yard run, Rece Verhoff kick (Drive: 13 plays, 75 yards, 6:46; Marshall 7–0)
- (7:32) OSU – Emeka Egbuka 68-yard pass from Will Howard, Jayden Fielding kick (Drive: 2 plays, 70 yards, 0:42; Tied 7–7)

Second quarter

- (12:31) OSU – Will Howard 1-yard run, Jayden Fielding kick (Drive: 6 plays, 45 yards, 2:26; Ohio State 14–7)
- (10:50) OSU – Quinshon Judkins 86-yard run, Jayden Fielding kick (Drive: 1 play, 86 yards, 0:12; Ohio State 21–7)
- (3:33) OSU – TreVeyon Henderson 14-yard run, Jayden Fielding kick (Drive: 7 plays, 80 yards, 3:30; Ohio State 28–7)
- (0:06) MRSH – Elijah Metcalf 13-yard pass from Stone Earle, Rece Verhoff kick (Drive: 9 plays, 65 yards, 3:27; Ohio State 28–14)

Third quarter

- (11:48) OSU – TreVeyon Henderson 40-yard run, Jayden Fielding kick (Drive: 6 plays, 75 yards, 3:12; Ohio State 35–14)
- (3:31) OSU – Jeremiah Smith 53-yard pass from Will Howard, Austin Snyder kick (Drive: 1 play, 53 yards, 0:09; Ohio State 42–14)

Fourth quarter

- (13:46) OSU – Quinshon Judkins 6-yard run, Austin Snyder kick (Drive: 9 plays, 83 yards, 3:14; Ohio State 49–14)

| Statistics | MRSH | OSU |
|---|---|---|
| First downs | 18 | 23 |
| Plays–yards | 70–264 | 57–569 |
| Rushes–yards | 43–125 | 31–280 |
| Passing yards | 139 | 289 |
| Passing: Comp–Att–Int | 18–27–0 | 18–26–1 |
| Time of possession | 36:15 | 23:45 |

| Team | Category | Player | Statistics |
|---|---|---|---|
| Marshall | Passing | Stone Earle | 16/21, 132 yards, TD |
| Marshall | Rushing | A. J. Turner | 7 carries, 32 yards |
| Marshall | Receiving | Elijah Metcalf | 8 receptions, 68 yards, TD |
| Ohio State | Passing | Will Howard | 16/20, 275 yards, 2 TD, INT |
| Ohio State | Rushing | Quinshon Judkins | 14 carries, 173 yards, 2 TD |
| Ohio State | Receiving | Emeka Egbuka | 5 receptions, 117 yards, TD |

=== vs Western Michigan ===
Game Four – Western Michigan Broncos (1–2) at Marshall Thundering Herd (1–2) – Game summary

| Quarter | 1 | 2 | 3 | 4 | Total |
|---|---|---|---|---|---|
| Broncos | 3 | 0 | 14 | 3 | 20 |
| Thundering Herd | 7 | 10 | 3 | 7 | 27 |

at Joan C. Edwards Stadium • Huntington, WV

- Date: Saturday, September 28, 2024
- Game time: 3:30 p.m.
- Game weather: Rain • Temperature: 72 °F (22 °C)
- Game attendance: 18,723
- Referee: Greg Sujack
- TV announcers (ESPN+): Keith Morehouse (play-by-play) and Mark Martin (analyst)

Game information

First quarter

- (13:08) MRSH – Toby Payne 32 yard pass from Stone Earle, Rece Verhoff kick (Drive: 5 plays, 69 yards, 1:43; Marshall 7–0)
- (6:09) WMU – Luka Zaruk 45 yard field goal (Drive: 6 plays, 42 yards, 1:51; Marshall 7–3)

Second quarter

- (12:18) MRSH – Rece Verhoff 20 yard field goal (Drive: 16 plays, 77 yards, 8:48; Marshall 10–3)
- (2:41) MRSH – Carl Chester 7 yard pass from Stone Earle, Rece Verhoff kick (Drive: 6 plays, 86 yards, 1:51; Marshall 17–3)

Third quarter

- (10:41) WMU – Jaden Nixon 36 yard run, Luka Zaruk kick (Drive: 8 plays, 75 yards, 4:19; Marshall 17–10)
- (5:52) MRSH – Rece Verhoff 28 yard field goal (Drive: 12 plays, 58 yards, 4:51; Marshall 20–10)
- (0:53) WMU – Blake Bosma 3 yard pass from Hayden Wolff, Luka Zaruk kick (Drive: 9 plays, 75 yards, 4:59; Marshall 20–17)

Fourth quarter

- (12:47) WMU – Luka Zaruk 45 yard field goal (Drive: 4 plays, 6 yards, 1:58; Tied 20–20)
- (7:39) MRSH – Christian Fitzpatrick 34 yard pass from Stone Earle, Rece Verhoff kick (Drive: 3 plays, 70 yards, 1:03; Marshall 27–20)

| Statistics | WMU | MRSH |
|---|---|---|
| First downs | 21 | 20 |
| Plays–yards | 69–318 | 64–420 |
| Rushes–yards | 41–192 | 39–243 |
| Passing yards | 126 | 177 |
| Passing: Comp–Att–Int | 15–28–0 | 15–25–0 |
| Time of possession | 31:29 | 28:31 |

| Team | Category | Player | Statistics |
|---|---|---|---|
| Western Michigan | Passing | Hayden Wolff | 15/28, 126 yards, 1 TD |
| Western Michigan | Rushing | Jaden Nixon | 23 carries, 146 yards, 1 TD |
| Western Michigan | Receiving | Anthony Sambucci | 4 receptions, 56 yards |
| Marshall | Passing | Stone Earle | 15/25, 177 yards, 3 TD |
| Marshall | Rushing | A. J. Turner | 9 carries, 124 yards |
| Marshall | Receiving | Elijah Metcalf | 4 receptions, 52 yards |

=== vs Appalachian State (rivalry) ===
Game Five – Appalachian State Mountaineers (2–2) at Marshall Thundering Herd (2–2) – Game summary

| Quarter | 1 | 2 | 3 | 4 | Total |
|---|---|---|---|---|---|
| Mountaineers | 3 | 14 | 7 | 13 | 37 |
| Thundering Herd | 7 | 21 | 10 | 14 | 52 |

at Joan C. Edwards Stadium • Huntington, WV

- Date: Saturday, October 5, 2024
- Game time: 3:30 p.m.
- Game weather: Sunny • Temperature: 77 °F (25 °C)
- Game attendance: 28,023
- Referee: Tim Barker
- TV announcers (ESPN+): Mark Martin (play-by-play) and Keith Morehouse (analyst)

Game information

First quarter

- (11:56) MRSH – Braylon Braxton 3 yard run, Rece Verhoff kick (Drive: 4 plays, 48 yards, 1:45; Marshall 7–0)
- (7:51) APP – Jackson Moore 42 yard field goal (Drive: 10 plays, 51 yards, 4:05; Marshall 7–3)

Second quarter

- (14:55) APP – Kanye Roberts 10 yard run, Jackson Moore kick (Drive: 14 plays, 94 yards, 6:26; Appalachian State 10–7)
- (14:05) MRSH – Jordan Houston 75 yard pass from Braylon Braxton, Rece Verhoff kick (Drive: 2 plays, 76 yards, 0:46; Marshall 14–10)
- (13:53) MRSH – J'Coryan Anderson 13 yard interception return, Rece Verhoff kick (Marshall 21–10)
- (4:58) MRSH – A. J. Turner 5 yard pass from Braylon Braxton, Rece Verhoff kick (Drive: 9 plays, 79 yards, 3:06; Marshall 28–10)
- (0:47) APP – Dalton Stroman 21 yard pass from Joey Aguilar, Jackson Moore kick (Drive: 9 plays, 75 yards, 4:11; Marshall 28–17)

Third quarter

- (7:01) MRSH – A. J. Turner 29 yard run, Rece Verhoff kick (Drive: 8 plays, 80 yards, 3:56; Marshall 35–17)
- (5:06) MRSH – Rece Verhoff 38 yard field goal (Drive: 4 plays, 8 yards, 1:49; Marshall 38–17)
- (1:50) APP – Dalton Stroman 27 yard pass from Joey Aguilar, Jackson Moore kick (Drive: 8 plays, 75 yards, 3:16; Marshall 38–24)

Fourth quarter

- (11:12) MRSH – Chuck Montgomery 26 yard pass from Braylon Braxton, Rece Verhoff kick (Drive: 10 plays, 65 yards, 5:33; Marshall 45–24)
- (6:05) APP – Ahmani Marshall 2 yard run, Jackson Moore kick (Drive: 14 plays, 75 yards, 5:07; Marshall 45–31)
- (4:16) MRSH – Braylon Braxton 35 yard run, Rece Verhoff kick (Drive: 6 plays, 58 yards, 1:49; Marshall 52–31)
- (1:13) APP – Ahmani Marshall 2 yard run, Joey Aguilar pass failed (Drive: 10 plays, 75 yards, 3:03; Marshall 52–37)

| Statistics | APP | MRSH |
|---|---|---|
| First downs | 32 | 21 |
| Plays–yards | 84–473 | 53–365 |
| Rushes–yards | 40–180 | 39–236 |
| Passing yards | 293 | 129 |
| Passing: Comp–Att–Int | 26–44–2 | 8–14–0 |
| Time of possession | 35:34 | 24:26 |

| Team | Category | Player | Statistics |
|---|---|---|---|
| Appalachian State | Passing | Joey Aguilar | 26/44, 293 yards, 2 TD, 2 INT |
| Appalachian State | Rushing | Joey Aguilar | 10 carries, 55 yards |
| Appalachian State | Receiving | Kaedin Robinson | 8 receptions, 94 yards |
| Marshall | Passing | Braylon Braxton | 8/14, 129 yards, 3 TD |
| Marshall | Rushing | Braylon Braxton | 15 carries, 140 yards, 2 TD |
| Marshall | Receiving | Jordan Houston | 1 reception, 75 yards, 1 TD |

=== at Georgia Southern ===
Game Six – Marshall Thundering Herd (3–2) at Georgia Southern Eagles (3–2) – Game summary

| Quarter | 1 | 2 | 3 | 4 | Total |
|---|---|---|---|---|---|
| Thundering Herd | 6 | 10 | 7 | 0 | 23 |
| Eagles | 3 | 0 | 0 | 21 | 24 |

at Paulson Stadium • Statesboro, GA

- Date: Saturday, October 12, 2024
- Game time: 8:00 p.m.
- Game weather: Sunny • Temperature: 70 °F (21 °C)
- Game attendance: 24,048
- Referee: Trennis Livingston
- TV announcers (ESPNU): Lowell Galindo (play-by-play) and Fozzy Whittaker (analyst)

Game information

First quarter

- (11:56) MRSH – Rece Verhoff 36-yard field goal (Drive: 7 plays, 57 yards, 3:04; Marshall 3–0)
- (5:28) MRSH – Rece Verhoff 51-yard field goal (Drive: 5 plays, -13 yards, 2:38; Marshall 6–0)
- (2:13) GASO – Gavin Stewart 42-yard field goal (Drive: 8 plays, 46 yards, 3:15; Marshall 6–3)

Second quarter

- (12:28) MRSH – Rece Verhoff 42-yard field goal (Drive: 11 plays, 51 yards, 4:45; Marshall 9–3)
- (4:49) MRSH – Toby Payne 3-yard pass from Braylon Braxton, Rece Verhoff kick (Drive: 13 plays, 96 yards, 5:30; Marshall 16–3)

Third quarter

- (7:05) MRSH – Toby Payne 11-yard pass from Braylon Braxton, Rece Verhoff kick (Drive: 7 plays, 80 yards, 3:36; Marshall 23–3)

Fourth quarter

- (10:08) GASO – Cam Williams 0-yard safety (Marshall 23–5)
- (6:31) GASO – Dexter Williams II 1-yard run (Drive: 9 plays, 63 yards, 3:12; Marshall 23–11)
- (2:15) GASO – David Mbadinga 3-yard run, Gavin Stewart kick (Drive: 6 plays, 51 yards, 1:50; Marshall 23–18)
- (1:00) GASO – Derwin Burgess Jr. 34-yard pass from Dexter Williams II (Drive: 7 plays, 66 yards, 0:55; Georgia Southern 24–23)

| Statistics | MRSH | GASO |
|---|---|---|
| First downs | 18 | 21 |
| Plays–yards | 72–389 | 74–422 |
| Rushes–yards | 43–200 | 33–93 |
| Passing yards | 189 | 329 |
| Passing: Comp–Att–Int | 18–29–1 | 26–41–1 |
| Time of possession | 31:03 | 28:57 |

| Team | Category | Player | Statistics |
|---|---|---|---|
| Marshall | Passing | Stone Earle | 9/17, 97 yards, INT |
| Marshall | Rushing | A. J. Turner | 14 carries, 97 yards |
| Marshall | Receiving | Christian Fitzpatrick | 5 receptions, 49 yards |
| Georgia Southern | Passing | JC French | 16/26, 194 yards, INT |
| Georgia Southern | Rushing | JC French | 11 carries, 25 yards |
| Georgia Southern | Receiving | Dalen Cobb | 6 receptions, 93 yards |

=== vs Georgia State ===
Game Seven – Georgia State Panthers (2–3) at Marshall Thundering Herd (3–3) – Game summary

| Quarter | 1 | 2 | 3 | 4 | Total |
|---|---|---|---|---|---|
| Panthers | 0 | 10 | 7 | 3 | 20 |
| Thundering Herd | 11 | 14 | 0 | 10 | 35 |

at Joan C. Edwards Stadium • Huntington, WV

- Date: Thursday, October 17, 2024
- Game time: 7:00 PM
- Game weather: Sunny
- Game attendance: 20,703
- Referee: Jeremy Parker
- TV announcers (ESPN2): Matt Schumacker (play-by-play) and Dustin Fox (analyst)

Game information

First quarter

- (12:10) MRSH – A. J. Turner 2 yard run, Toby Payne run (Drive: 7 plays, 61 yards, 2:42; Marshall 8–0)
- (3:10) MRSH – Rece Verhoff 47 yard field goal (Drive: 11 plays, 69 yards, 5:46; Marshall 11–0)

Second quarter

- (14:48) MRSH – A. J. Turner 23 yard run, Rece Verhoff kick (Drive: 6 plays, 64 yards, 2:26; Marshall 18–0)
- (11:15) GAST – Liam Rickman 36 yard field goal (Drive: 9 plays, 57 yards, 3:33; Marshall 18–3)
- (3:47) GAST – Michael Dukes 13 yard pass from Zach Gibson, Liam Rickman kick (Drive: 13 plays, 76 yards, 6:30; Marshall 18–10)
- (0:28) MRSH – A. J. Turner 30 yard pass from Braylon Braxton, Rece Verhoff kick (Drive: 11 plays, 75 yards, 3:19; Marshall 25–10)

Third quarter

- (5:51) GAST – Michael Dukes 3 yard pass from Zach Gibson, Liam Rickman kick (Drive: 8 plays, 55 yards, 4:17; Marshall 25–17)

Fourth quarter

- (14:51) GAST – Liam Rickman 20 yard field goal (Drive: 8 plays, 52 yards, 3:33; Marshall 25–20)
- (9:36) MRSH – Rece Verhoff 49 yard field goal (Drive: 6 plays, 22 yards, 2:37; Marshall 28–20)
- (1:39) MRSH – A. J. Turner 88 yard run, Rece Verhoff kick (Drive: 1 play, 88 yards, 0:13; Marshall 35–20)

| Statistics | GAST | MRSH |
|---|---|---|
| First downs | 23 | 21 |
| Plays–yards | 72–427 | 57–427 |
| Rushes–yards | 36–218 | 37–295 |
| Passing yards | 209 | 132 |
| Passing: Comp–Att–Int | 21–36–0 | 11–20–1 |
| Time of possession | 34:42 | 25:18 |

| Team | Category | Player | Statistics |
|---|---|---|---|
| Georgia State | Passing | Zach Gibson | 19/32, 192 yards, 2 TD |
| Georgia State | Rushing | Freddie Brock | 18 carries, 124 yards |
| Georgia State | Receiving | Dorian Fleming | 7 reception, 66 yards |
| Marshall | Passing | Braylon Braxton | 11/20, 132 yards, TD, INT |
| Marshall | Rushing | A. J. Turner | 15 carries, 177 yards, 3 TD |
| Marshall | Receiving | Toby Payne | 4 receptions, 53 yards |

=== vs Louisiana-Monroe ===
Game Eight – Louisiana–Monroe Warhawks (5–2) at Marshall Thundering Herd (4–3) – Game summary

| Quarter | 1 | 2 | 3 | 4 | Total |
|---|---|---|---|---|---|
| Warhawks | 7 | 7 | 0 | 9 | 23 |
| Thundering Herd | 7 | 7 | 0 | 14 | 28 |

at Joan C. Edwards Stadium • Huntington, WV

- Date: Saturday, November 2, 2024
- Game time: 3:30 p.m.
- Game weather: Sunny
- Game attendance: 21,478
- Referee: Ted Pitts
- TV announcers (ESPN+): Mark Martin (play-by-play) and Keith Morehouse (analyst)

Game information

First quarter

- (6:47) MRSH – A. J. Turner 6 yard run, Rece Verhoff kick (Drive: 6 plays, 38 yards, 2:37; Marshall 7–0)
- (3:39) ULM – James Jones 41 yard pass from Aidan Armenta, Max Larson kick (Drive: 6 plays, 75 yards, 3:08; Tied 7–7)

Second quarter

- (10:33) ULM – Ahmad Hardy 80 yard run, Max Larson kick (Drive: 1 play, 80 yards, 0:11; Louisiana–Monroe 14–7)
- (3:52) MRSH – Ethan Payne 1 yard run, Rece Verhoff kick (Drive: 9 plays, 83 yards, 3:25; Tied 14–14)

Third quarter

- No scoring plays

Fourth quarter

- (14:07) ULM – Max Larson 29 yard field goal (Drive: 8 plays, 42 yards, 4:08; Louisiana–Monroe 17–14)
- (13:20) MRSH – Christian Fitzpatrick 33 yard pass from Braylon Braxton, Rece Verhoff kick (Drive: 2 plays, 78 yards, 0:40; Marshall 21–17)
- (3:17) MRSH – Ethan Payne 8 yard run, Rece Verhoff kick (Drive: 6 plays, 48 yards, 3:28; Marshall 28–17)
- (1:48) ULM – Artis Cole 26 yard pass from Aidan Armenta, Aidan Armenta pass failed (Drive: 4 plays, 75 yards, 1:29; Marshall 28–23)

| Statistics | ULM | MRSH |
|---|---|---|
| First downs | 17 | 20 |
| Plays–yards | 58–388 | 62–364 |
| Rushes–yards | 45–239 | 43–198 |
| Passing yards | 149 | 166 |
| Passing: Comp–Att–Int | 9–13–1 | 10–19–0 |
| Time of possession | 32:27 | 27:33 |

| Team | Category | Player | Statistics |
|---|---|---|---|
| Louisiana–Monroe | Passing | Aidan Armenta | 9/13, 149 yards, 2 TD, INT |
| Louisiana–Monroe | Rushing | Ahmad Hardy | 25 carries, 207 yards, TD |
| Louisiana–Monroe | Receiving | James Jones | 2 receptions, 43 yards, TD |
| Marshall | Passing | Braylon Braxton | 10/19, 166 yards, TD |
| Marshall | Rushing | Jordan Houston | 9 carries, 80 yards |
| Marshall | Receiving | Charles Montgomery | 4 receptions, 68 yards |

=== at Southern Miss ===
Game Nine – Marshall Thundering Herd (5–3) at Southern Miss Golden Eagles (1–7) – Game summary

| Quarter | 1 | 2 | 3 | 4 | Total |
|---|---|---|---|---|---|
| Thundering Herd | 3 | 14 | 17 | 3 | 37 |
| Golden Eagles | 0 | 3 | 0 | 0 | 3 |

at M. M. Roberts Stadium • Hattiesburg, MS

- Date: Saturday, November 9, 2024
- Game time: 3:00 p.m.
- Game weather: Clear • Temperature: 85 °F (29 °C) • Wind: SE 7 mph
- Game attendance: 20,502
- Referee: Tim Barker
- TV announcers (ESPN+): Jason Baker (play-by-play) and Austin Davis (analyst)

Game information

First quarter

- (12:40) MRSH – Nathan Totten 23 yard field goal (Drive: 5 plays, 76 yards, 1:05; Marshall 3–0)

Second quarter

- (13:43) MRSH – Braylon Braxton 2 yard run, Nathan Totten kick (Drive: 7 plays, 48 yards, 3:39; Marshall 10–0)
- (10:02) USM – Connor Gibbs 51 yard field goal (Drive: 8 plays, 41 yards, 3:41; Marshall 10–3)
- (6:42) MRSH – Ethan Payne 36 yard run, Nathan Totten kick (Drive: 7 plays, 75 yards, 3:20; Marshall 17–3)

Third quarter

- (13:29) MRSH – Tychaun Chapman 14 yard run, Nathan Totten kick (Drive: 4 plays, 73 yards, 1:24; Marshall 24–3)
- (10:45) MRSH – Toby Payne 18 yard pass from Braylon Braxton, Nathan Totten kick (Drive: 4 plays, 41 yards, 1:23; Marshall 31–3)
- (3:19) MRSH – Nathan Totten 27 yard field goal (Drive: 14 plays, 41 yards, 6:14; Marshall 34–3)

Fourth quarter

- (8:26) MRSH – Nathan Totten 26 yard field goal (Drive: 9 plays, 63 yards, 3:41; Marshall 37–3)

| Statistics | MRSH | USM |
|---|---|---|
| First downs | 21 | 8 |
| Plays–yards | 72–526 | 58–183 |
| Rushes–yards | 47–267 | 40–113 |
| Passing yards | 259 | 70 |
| Passing: Comp–Att–Int | 16–25–1 | 5–18–3 |
| Time of possession | 33:25 | 26:35 |

| Team | Category | Player | Statistics |
|---|---|---|---|
| Marshall | Passing | Braylon Braxton | 14/21, 220 yards, 1 TD, 1 INT |
| Marshall | Rushing | Ethan Payne | 13 carries, 104 yards, 1 TD |
| Marshall | Receiving | Christian Fitzpatrick | 2 receptions, 78 yards |
| Southern Miss | Passing | Ethan Crawford | 5/18, 70 yards, 3 INT |
| Southern Miss | Rushing | Rodrigues Clark | 8 carries, 61 yards |
| Southern Miss | Receiving | Tiaquelin Mims | 1 reception, 35 yards |

=== vs Coastal Carolina ===
Game Ten – Coastal Carolina Chanticleers (5–4) at Marshall Thundering Herd (6–3) – Game summary

| Quarter | 1 | 2 | 3 | 4 | Total |
|---|---|---|---|---|---|
| Chanticleers | 7 | 0 | 0 | 12 | 19 |
| Thundering Herd | 3 | 14 | 7 | 7 | 31 |

at Joan C. Edwards Stadium • Huntington, WV

- Date: Saturday, November 16, 2024
- Game time: 1:00 p.m.
- Game weather: Sunny
- Game attendance: 24,175
- Referee: Trennis Livingston
- TV announcers (ESPN+): Mark Martin (play-by-play) and Keith Morehouse (analyst)

Game information

First quarter

- (11:04) CCU – Braydon Bennett 4 yard run, Kade Hensley kick (Drive: 9 plays, 75 yards, 3:56; Coastal Carolina 7–0)
- (2:47) MRSH – Nathan Totten 39 yard field goal (Drive: 9 plays, 53 yards, 3:42; Coastal Carolina 7–3)

Second quarter

- (9:06) MRSH – Charles Montgomery 14 yard pass from Braylon Braxton, Nathan Totten kick (Drive: 9 plays, 37 yards, 5:56; Marshall 10–7)
- (3:47) MRSH – Jacobie Henderson 65 yard blocked field goal return, Nathan Totten kick (Marshall 17–7)

Third quarter

- (2:02) MRSH – Christian Fitzpatrick 7 yard pass from Braylon Braxton, Nathan Totten kick (Drive: 10 plays, 92 yards, 4:14; Marshall 24–7)

Fourth quarter

- (13:44) CCU – Kade Hensley 46 yard field goal (Drive: 9 plays, 46 yards, 3:18; Marshall 24–10)
- (11:55) MRSH – Toby Payne 2 yard pass from Braylon Braxton, Nathan Totten kick (Drive: 1 play, 2 yards, 0:03; Marshall 31–10)
- (11:04) CCU – Jameson Tucker 47 yard pass from Ethan Vasko, Kade Hensley kick (Drive: 3 plays, 75 yards, 0:51; Marshall 31–17)
- (6:56) CCU – TEAM –32 yard safety (Marshall 31–19)

| Statistics | CCU | MRSH |
|---|---|---|
| First downs | 20 | 17 |
| Plays–yards | 76–391 | 63–254 |
| Rushes–yards | 36–124 | 32–35 |
| Passing yards | 267 | 219 |
| Passing: Comp–Att–Int | 21–40–1 | 20–31–0 |
| Time of possession | 30:52 | 29:08 |

| Team | Category | Player | Statistics |
|---|---|---|---|
| Coastal Carolina | Passing | Ethan Vasko | 21/39, 267 yards, TD, INT |
| Coastal Carolina | Rushing | Braydon Bennett | 19 carries, 67 yards, TD |
| Coastal Carolina | Receiving | Bryson Graves | 6 receptions, 87 yards |
| Marshall | Passing | Braylon Braxton | 21/30, 219 yards, 3 TD |
| Marshall | Rushing | Jordan Houston | 9 carries, 33 yards |
| Marshall | Receiving | Carl Chester | 4 receptions, 69 yards |

=== at Old Dominion ===
Game Eleven – Marshall Thundering Herd (7–3) at Old Dominion Monarchs (4–6) – Game summary

| Quarter | 1 | 2 | 3 | 4 | Total |
|---|---|---|---|---|---|
| Thundering Herd | 3 | 14 | 10 | 15 | 42 |
| Monarchs | 0 | 7 | 21 | 7 | 35 |

at S.B. Ballard Stadium • Norfolk, VA

- Date: Saturday, November 23, 2024
- Game time: 7:30 p.m.
- Game weather: Cloudy • Temperature: 51 °F (11 °C) • Wind: NW 13 mph
- Game attendance: 18,083
- Referee: Marshall Lewis
- TV announcers (ESPNU): Courtney Lyle (play-by-play) and Leger Douzable (analyst)

Game information

First quarter

- (11:55) MRSH – Rece Verhoff 43 yard field goal (Drive: 4 plays, 5 yards, 0:47; Marshall 3–0)

Second quarter

- (14:52) MRSH – Christian Fitzpatrick 51 yard pass from Braylon Braxton, Rece Verhoff kick (Drive: 7 plays, 80 yards, 3:13; Marshall 10–0)
- (9:25) ODU – Aaron Young 24 yard run, Ethan Sanchez kick (Drive: 11 plays, 85 yards, 5:22; Marshall 10–7)
- (2:21) MRSH – Jordan Houston 30 yard run, Rece Verhoff kick (Drive: 6 plays, 71 yards, 1:23; Marshall 17–7)

Third quarter

- (13:03) ODU – Aaron Young 2 yard run, Ethan Sanchez kick (Drive: 5 plays, 75 yards, 1:57; Marshall 17–14)
- (10:27) MRSH – Rece Verhoff 31 yard field goal (Drive: 7 plays, 32 yards, 2:27; Marshall 20–14)
- (6:47) ODU – Na'eem Abdul-Rahim Gladding 10 yard pass from Colton Joseph, Ethan Sanchez kick (Drive: 7 plays, 84 yards, 3:35; Old Dominion 21–20)
- (4:17) MRSH – Charles Montgomery 22 yard pass from Braylon Braxton, Rece Verhoff kick (Drive: 1 play, 22 yards, 0:05; Marshall 27–21)
- (0:52) ODU – Colton Joseph 8 yard run, Ethan Sanchez kick (Drive: 8 plays, 75 yards, 3:25; Old Dominion 28–27)

Fourth quarter

- (14:52) MRSH – Carl Chester 37 yard pass from Braylon Braxton, Braylon Braxton pass (Drive: 2 plays, 50 yards, 0:51; Marshall 35–28)
- (8:23) ODU – Colton Joseph 1 yard run, Ethan Sanchez kick (Drive: 12 plays, 75 yards, 6:29; Tied 35–35)
- (4:03) MRSH – Ethan Payne 1 yard run, Rece Verhoff kick (Drive: 11 plays, 75 yards, 4:20; Marshall 42–35)

| Statistics | MRSH | ODU |
|---|---|---|
| First downs | 21 | 24 |
| Plays–yards | 66–469 | 77–513 |
| Rushes–yards | 42–259 | 46–286 |
| Passing yards | 210 | 227 |
| Passing: Comp–Att–Int | 13–24–0 | 19–31–1 |
| Time of possession | 26:04 | 33:56 |

| Team | Category | Player | Statistics |
|---|---|---|---|
| Marshall | Passing | Braylon Braxton | 13/24, 210 yards, 3 TD |
| Marshall | Rushing | Braylon Braxton | 18 carries, 140 yards |
| Marshall | Receiving | Christian Fitzpatrick | 2 reception, 69 yards, TD |
| Old Dominion | Passing | Cotlon Joseph | 19/31, 227 yards, TD, INT |
| Old Dominion | Rushing | Colton Joseph | 25 carries, 158 yards, 2 TD |
| Old Dominion | Receiving | Isiah Paige | 7 receptions, 103 yards |

=== at James Madison ===
Game Twelve – Marshall Thundering Herd (8–3) at James Madison Dukes (8–3) – Game summary

| Quarter | 1 | 2 | 3 | 4 | OT | 2OT | Total |
|---|---|---|---|---|---|---|---|
| Thundering Herd | 0 | 0 | 17 | 7 | 3 | 8 | 35 |
| Dukes | 14 | 3 | 0 | 7 | 3 | 6 | 33 |

at Bridgeforth Stadium • Harrisonburg, VA

- Date: Saturday, November 30, 2024
- Game time: 8:00 p.m.
- Game weather: Cloudy • Temperature: 26 °F (−3 °C) • Wind: SW 2 mph
- Game attendance: 23,341
- Referee: Ted Pitts
- TV announcers (ESPNU): Lowell Galindo (play-by-play) and Fozzy Whittaker (analyst)

Game information

First quarter

- (11:43) JMU – George Pettaway 5 yard run, Noe Ruelas kick (Drive: 7 plays, 75 yards, 3:17; James Madison 7–0)
- (4:17) JMU – Omarion Dollison 9 yard pass from Alonza Barnett III, Noe Ruelas kick (Drive: 11 plays, 90 yards, 6:04; James Madison 14–0)

Second quarter

- (8:27) JMU – Noe Ruelas 23 yard field goal (Drive: 10 plays, 83 yards, 8:32; James Madison 17–0)

Third quarter

- (9:43) MRSH – Rece Verhoff 42 yard field goal (Drive: 12 plays, 48 yards, 5:09; James Madison 17–3)
- (2:18) MRSH – Toby Payne 16 yard pass from Braylon Braxton, Rece Verhoff kick (Drive: 5 plays, 45 yards, 1:37; James Madison 17–10)
- (2:11) MRSH – Jadarius Green-McKnight 28 yard interception return, Rece Verhoff kick (Tied 17–17)

Fourth quarter

- (11:09) JMU – Jobi Malary 7 yard run, Noe Ruelas kick (Drive: 10 plays, 65 yards, 6:02; James Madison 24–17)
- (5:04) MRSH – Barylon Braxton 1 yard run, Rece Verhoff kick (Drive: 12 plays, 72 yards, 6:05; Tied 24–24)

First overtime

- MRSH – Rece Verhoff 49 yard field goal (Drive: 4 plays, –6 yards; Marshall 27–24)
- JMU – Noe Ruelas 23 yard field goal (Drive: 4 plays, 5 yards; Tied 27–27)

Second overtime

- JMU – Wayne Knight 9 yard pass from Alonza Barnett III, Alonza Barnett III pass failed (Drive: 6 plays, 25 yards; James Madison 33–27)
- MRSH – Tychaun Chapman 10 yard run, Braylon Braxton pass to Charles Montgomery (Drive: 4 plays, 25 yards; Marshall 35–33)

| Statistics | MRSH | JMU |
|---|---|---|
| First downs | 17 | 22 |
| Plays–yards | 63–261 | 72–382 |
| Rushes–yards | 38–141 | 53–244 |
| Passing yards | 120 | 138 |
| Passing: Comp–Att–Int | 13–25–0 | 14–19–1 |
| Time of possession | 24:27 | 35:33 |

| Team | Category | Player | Statistics |
|---|---|---|---|
| Marshall | Passing | Braylon Braxton | 13/24, 120 yards, TD |
| Marshall | Rushing | Jordan Houston | 6 carries, 50 yards |
| Marshall | Receiving | Bralon Brown | 3 receptions, 39 yards |
| James Madison | Passing | Alonza Barnett III | 14/19, 138 yards, 2 TD, INT |
| James Madison | Rushing | Jobi Malary | 16 carries, 106 yards, TD |
| James Madison | Receiving | Omarion Dollison | 4 receptions, 46 yards, TD |

=== at Louisiana (Sun Belt Championship) ===
Sun Belt Conference Championship Game – Marshall Thundering Herd (9–3) at Louisiana Ragin' Cajuns (10–2) – Game summary

| Quarter | 1 | 2 | 3 | 4 | Total |
|---|---|---|---|---|---|
| Thundering Herd | 7 | 10 | 7 | 7 | 31 |
| Ragin' Cajuns | 3 | 0 | 0 | 0 | 3 |

at Cajun Field • Lafayette, Louisiana

- Date: Saturday, December 7, 2024
- Game time: 7:30 p.m.
- Game weather: Cloudy • Temperature: 45 °F (7 °C) • Wind: W 2 mph
- Game attendance: 20,067
- Referee: Trennis Livingston
- TV announcers (ESPN): Roy Philpott (play-by-play), Sam Acho (analyst), and Lauren Sisler (sideline reporter)

Game information

First quarter

- (6:42) LA – Kenneth Almendares 40 yard field goal (Drive: 5 plays, 52 yards, 2:05; Louisiana 3–0)
- (4:04) MRSH – Tychaun Chapman 37 yard pass from Braylon Braxton, Rece Verhoff kick (Drive: 7 plays, 75 yards, 2:38; Marshall 7–3)

Second quarter

- (7:54) MRSH – Rece Verhoff 32 yard field goal (Drive: 9 plays, 54 yards, 4:14; Marshall 10–3)
- (2:47) MRSH – Ethan Payne 15 yard run, Rece Verhoff kick (Drive: 7 plays, 56 yards, 3:04; Marshall 17–3)

Third quarter

- (7:43) MRSH – Bralon Brown 20 yard pass from Braylon Braxton, Rece Verhoff kick (Drive: 9 plays, 56 yards, 4:24; Marshall 24–3)

Fourth quarter

- (2:03) MRSH – Jordan Houston 9 yard run, Rece Verhoff kick (Drive: 8 plays, 86 yards, 5:45; Marshall 31–3)

| Statistics | MRSH | LA |
|---|---|---|
| First downs | 25 | 11 |
| Plays–yards | 70–410 | 60–255 |
| Rushes–yards | 44–217 | 28–56 |
| Passing yards | 193 | 199 |
| Passing: Comp–Att–Int | 18–26–0 | 13–32–1 |
| Time of possession | 33:56 | 26:04 |

| Team | Category | Player | Statistics |
|---|---|---|---|
| Marshall | Passing | Braylon Braxton | 18/26, 193 yards, 2TD |
| Marshall | Rushing | Jordan Houston | 17 carries, 117 yards, TD |
| Marshall | Receiving | Tychaun Chapman | 8 receptions, 86 yards, TD |
| Louisiana | Passing | Chandler Fields | 4/8, 104 yards |
| Louisiana | Rushing | Zylan Perry | 6 carries, 25 yards |
| Louisiana | Receiving | Lance LeGendre | 4 receptions, 81 yards |
