= Braylon Braxton =

American football player

Profile
- Position: Quarterback

Personal information
- Born: October 6, 2002 (age 24)
- Listed height: 6 ft 2 in (1.88 m)
- Listed weight: 230 lb (104 kg)

Career information
- High school: Independence (Frisco, Texas)
- College: Tulsa (2021–2023); Marshall (2024); Southern Miss (2025)
- NFL draft: 2026: undrafted

Awards and highlights
- Sun Belt Newcomer of the Year (2024); Second-team All-Sun Belt (2024)
- Stats at ESPN

Braylon Braxton is an American football quarterback. He played college football for the Marshall Thundering Herd, Tulsa Golden Hurricane, and Southern Miss Golden Eagles.

== Early life ==
Braxton attended Independence High School in Frisco, Texas. He was rated as a three-star recruit and committed to play college football for the Tulsa Golden Hurricane.

== College career ==
=== Tulsa ===
In 2021, Braxton appeared in four games and took a redshirt. In week 11 of the 2022 season, he made his first collegiate start, where he completed 13 of 25 passes for 146 yards and a touchdown and rushed for 32 yards in a loss to Tulane. During the 2022 season, Braxton completed 92 of 163 pass attempts for 1,133 yards and ten touchdowns and rushed for 145 yards and five touchdowns, earning Freshman All-America honorable mention by College Football Network. After the season, he entered his name into the NCAA transfer portal, but later withdrew his name and returned to Tulsa. In 2023, Braxton suffered through injuries, where he completed 22 of 50 passes for 222 yards and two touchdowns with six interceptions, while also rushing for 174 yards. After the season, he entered his name into the NCAA transfer portal.

=== Marshall ===
Braxton transferred to play for the Marshall Thundering Herd. In 2024, he started eight games, where he threw for 1,624 yards and 19 touchdowns with two interceptions, completing 60.2% of his passes, while also adding 610 yards and four touchdowns on the ground. Braxton was named the Sun Belt newcomer of the year and second-team all-Sun Belt. After the season, he entered his name into the NCAA transfer portal.

=== Southern Miss ===
Braxton transferred to play for the Southern Miss Golden Eagles.

=== Statistics ===
Season	Team	Games			Passing								Rushing			
Season	Team	GP	GS	Record	Cmp	Att	Pct	Yds	Y/A	TD	Int	Rtg	Att	Yds	Avg	TD
2021	Tulsa	4	0	—	0	0	0.0	0	0.0	0	0	0.0	9	38	4.2	1
2022	Tulsa	9	3	2–1	92	163	56.4	1,133	7.0	10	2	132.6	55	145	2.6	5
2023	Tulsa	6	5	1–4	22	50	44.0	212	4.2	2	6	68.8	40	174	4.4	0
2024	Marshall	11	8	8–0	124	206	60.2	1,624	7.9	19	2	154.9	134	610	4.6	4
2025	Southern Miss	12	12	7–5	254	400	63.5	3,054	7.6	24	8	143.4	98	210	2.1	1
Career		42	28	18–10	492	819	60.1	6,023	7.4	55	18	139.6	336	1,177	3.5	11

== Professional career ==
On April 27, 2026, Braxton was invited to New Orleans Saints' rookie minicamp.
