= 2024 TCU Horned Frogs football team =

American college football season

2024 TCU Horned Frogs football

New Mexico Bowl champion

New Mexico Bowl, W 34–3 vs. Louisiana
- Conference: Big 12 Conference
- Record: 9–4 (6–3 Big 12)
- Head coach: Sonny Dykes (3rd season)
- Offensive coordinator: Kendal Briles (2nd season)
- Co-offensive coordinator: A. J. Ricker (3rd season)
- Offensive scheme: Bear raid
- Defensive coordinator: Andy Avalos (1st season)
- Base defense: 4–2–5
- Home stadium: Amon G. Carter Stadium

2024 Big 12 Conference football standings
	Conf.			Overall
Team	W		L	W		L
No. 7 Arizona State y$^	7	–	2	11	–	3
No. 15 Iowa State y	7	–	2	11	–	3
No. 13 BYU	7	–	2	11	–	2
No. 25 Colorado	7	–	2	9	–	4
Baylor	6	–	3	8	–	5
TCU	6	–	3	9	–	4
Texas Tech	6	–	3	8	–	5
Kansas State	5	–	4	9	–	4
West Virginia	5	–	4	6	–	7
Kansas	4	–	5	5	–	7
Cincinnati	3	–	6	5	–	7
Houston	3	–	6	4	–	8
Utah	2	–	7	5	–	7
UCF	2	–	7	4	–	8
Arizona	2	–	7	4	–	8
Oklahoma State	0	–	9	3	–	9
Championship: Arizona State 45, Iowa State 19
^ – College Football Playoff participant; $ – Conference champion; y – Championship game participant; Rankings from AP Poll

The 2024 TCU Horned Frogs football team represented Texas Christian University (TCU) in the 2024 NCAA Division I FBS football season. The Horned Frogs played their home games at Amon G. Carter Stadium in Fort Worth, Texas, and competed as members of the Big 12 Conference. They were led by third-year head coach Sonny Dykes.

== Offseason ==
=== Transfers ===
==== Outgoing ====
Name	Pos.	Height	Weight	Year	Hometown	New school
Cordale Russell	WR	6'4	210	RS Freshman	Mesquite, TX	Colorado
Jaionte McMillan	CB	5'11	190	RS Senior	Atlanta, GA	Minnesota
Ishmael Burdine	S	6'1	175	RS Senior	Slidell, LA	New Mexico
Jasper Lott	IOL	6'5	295	RS Junior	Argyle, TX	North Texas
Chandler Morris	QB	6'0	190	RS Junior	Highland Park, TX	North Texas
Grant Tisdale	QB	6'0	226	Senior	Allen, TX	North Texas
Damonic Williams	DT	6'2	320	Sophomore	Torrance, CA	Oklahoma
Mason White	CB	6'0	185	Senior	Van Nuys, CA	Oregon State
Daveion Crawford	S	5'11	210	RS Senior	La Porte, TX	Roosevelt
Rohan Fluellen	WR	6'0	175	Freshman	Gilmer, TX	Stephen F. Austin
Ezra Dotson-Oyetade	OL	6'3	285	RS Sophomore	Garland, TX	Texas State
Javeon Wilcox	S	6'0	185	RS Freshman	Temple, TX	Texas Tech
Chace Biddle	S	6'0	207	Junior	Garland, TX	Trinity Valley CC
Ronald "Champ" Lewis	CB	6'1	180	RS Freshman	New Orleans, LA	Tulsa
Zach Marcheselli	LB	6'2	225	RS Senior	Broken Arrow, OK	Tulsa
Logan Frederic	LS	6'3	210	RS Freshman	Littleton, CO	UConn
Ryan Quintanar	LB	6'0	220	RS Sophomore	Los Angeles, CA	USC
Corey Wren	RB	5'10	195	Junior	New Orleans, LA	UTEP
DJ Allen	WR	5'11	205	RS Sophomore	Gladewater, TX	UTSA
Randon Fontenette	S	6'3	215	Sophomore	Freeport, TX	Vanderbilt
Jonathan Bax	LB	6'3	235	Sophomore	New Orleans, LA	Withdrawn

==== Incoming ====
Name	Pos.	Height	Weight	Year	Hometown	Prev. school
James Brockermeyer	OL	6'3	295	Junior	Fort Worth, TX	Alabama
Jax Porter	TE	6'6	232	RS Freshman	Dallas, TX	Alabama
Dominique Johnson	RB	6'1	230	RS Junior	Crowley, TX	Arkansas
Jevon McIver Jr.	CB	6'1	177	RS Senior	Charlotte, NC	Austin Peay
Drake Dabney	TE	6'5	248	RS Senior	Cypress, TX	Baylor
Eric McAlister	WR	6'4	200	RS Junior	Azle, TX	Boise State
Kaleb Elarms-Orr	LB	6'2	230	RS Junior	Hayward, CA	California
Bless Harris	OL	6'5	326	RS Senior	New Orleans, LA	Florida State
Hakeem Ajijolaiya	DL	6'2	320	Senior	Katy, TX	Houston
Carson Bruno	IOL	6'4	312	RS Junior	Shreveport, LA	Louisiana Tech
Cameron Smith	S	6'0	180	RS Senior	Whiteville, NC	Memphis
Richard Toney	S	6'0	189	RS Junior	Arlington, TX	Nevada
Andre Seldon	CB	5'9	190	RS Junior	Belleville, MI	New Mexico State
Braylon James	WR	6'2	202	Sophomore	Round Rock, TX	Notre Dame
NaNa Osafo-Mensah	DL	6'3	265	RS Senior	Fort Worth, TX	Notre Dame
LaMareon James	CB	5'10	187	Senior	Chesapeake, VA	Old Dominion
Cade Bennett	IOL	6'3	305	RS Senior	Scottsdale, AZ	San Diego State
Cooper McDonald	LB	6'3	245	RS Senior	Haslet, TX	San Diego State
Remington Strickland	IOL	6'4	300	RS Junior	Sugar Land, TX	Texas A&M
Austin Jordan	DB	6'0	200	Junior	Denton, TX	Texas
Devean Deal	DE	6'4	245	RS Junior	Garland, TX	Tulane
Jaise Oliver	S	6'2	203	RS Senior	Fairfield, TX	Tulsa
JaTravis Broughton	CB	5'11	190	RS Senior	Tulsa, OK	Utah
Ken Seals	QB	6'3	220	RS Junior	Azle, TX	Vanderbilt

=== Recruiting class ===
College recruiting
Name	Hometown	School	Height	Weight	Commit date
Gekyle Baker; Wide receiver	Brownsboro, TX	Brownsboro High School	6 ft 2 in (1.88 m)	170 lb (77 kg)	Jun 23, 2023
Gekyle Baker; Wide receiver	Recruit ratings: Scout: Rivals: 247Sports: ESPN:				
Hauss Hejny; Quarterback	Aledo, TX	Aledo High School	5 ft 10.5 in (1.79 m)	185 lb (84 kg)	Apr 6, 2023
Hauss Hejny; Quarterback	Recruit ratings: Scout: Rivals: 247Sports: ESPN:				
Jeremy Payne; Running back	Missouri City, TX	Hightower High School	5 ft 10 in (1.78 m)	170 lb (77 kg)	Jun 18, 2023
Jeremy Payne; Running back	Recruit ratings: Scout: Rivals: 247Sports: ESPN:				
Travis Jackson; Defensive end	Tyler, TX	Tyler Legacy High School	6 ft 3.5 in (1.92 m)	230 lb (100 kg)	Apr 21, 2023
Travis Jackson; Defensive end	Recruit ratings: Scout: Rivals: 247Sports: ESPN:				
Nathaniel Palmer; Running back	Decatur, TX	Decatur High School	5 ft 10.5 in (1.79 m)	185 lb (84 kg)	Jun 16, 2023
Nathaniel Palmer; Running back	Recruit ratings: Scout: Rivals: 247Sports: ESPN:				
Devondre McGee; Cornerback	Conroe, TX	Conroe High School	6 ft 1 in (1.85 m)	180 lb (82 kg)	Jul 30, 2023
Devondre McGee; Cornerback	Recruit ratings: Scout: Rivals: 247Sports: ESPN:				
Tobias Steppes; Offensive tackle	Lancaster, TX	Lancaster High School	6 ft 5 in (1.96 m)	260 lb (120 kg)	May 12, 2023
Tobias Steppes; Offensive tackle	Recruit ratings: Scout: Rivals: 247Sports: ESPN:				
Dozie Ezukanma; Wide receiver	Fort Worth, TX	Timber Creek High School	6 ft 2 in (1.88 m)	180 lb (82 kg)	Nov 30, 2023
Dozie Ezukanma; Wide receiver	Recruit ratings: Scout: Rivals: 247Sports: ESPN:				
Wesley Harvey; Offensive tackle	Muskogee, OK	Muskogee High School	6 ft 7 in (2.01 m)	257 lb (117 kg)	Aug 1, 2023
Wesley Harvey; Offensive tackle	Recruit ratings: Scout: Rivals: 247Sports: ESPN:				
Creece Brister; Offensive line	Stephenville, TX	Stephenville High School	6 ft 4 in (1.93 m)	295 lb (134 kg)	Jul 30, 2023
Creece Brister; Offensive line	Recruit ratings: Scout: Rivals: 247Sports: ESPN:				
Mitch Hodnett; Offensive line	Monroe, LA	Sterlington High School	6 ft 5 in (1.96 m)	295 lb (134 kg)	Aug 3, 2023
Mitch Hodnett; Offensive line	Recruit ratings: Scout: Rivals: 247Sports: ESPN:				
Julian Knox; Athlete	Fort Worth, TX	North Crowley High School	6 ft 3 in (1.91 m)	180 lb (82 kg)	Jun 13, 2023
Julian Knox; Athlete	Recruit ratings: Scout: Rivals: 247Sports: ESPN:				
Ryan Hughes; Offensive tackle	The Woodlands, TX	The Woodlands High School	6 ft 6 in (1.98 m)	295 lb (134 kg)	Apr 15, 2023
Ryan Hughes; Offensive tackle	Recruit ratings: Scout: Rivals: 247Sports: ESPN:				
Kaden McFadden; Safety	Texarkana, TX	Pleasant Grove High School	5 ft 11 in (1.80 m)	185 lb (84 kg)	Dec 11, 2023
Kaden McFadden; Safety	Recruit ratings: Scout: Rivals: 247Sports: ESPN:				
Cole Snodgrass; Tight end	The Woodlands, TX	College Park High School	6 ft 4 in (1.93 m)	215 lb (98 kg)	Jun 17, 2023
Cole Snodgrass; Tight end	Recruit ratings: Scout: Rivals: 247Sports: ESPN:				
Samir Camacho; Offensive line	Cypress, TX	Cy Falls High School	6 ft 3.5 in (1.92 m)	281 lb (127 kg)	Dec 11, 2023
Samir Camacho; Offensive line	Recruit ratings: Scout: Rivals: 247Sports: ESPN:				
Sterlin Brooks; Defensive line	Crowley, TX	North Crowley High School	6 ft 4 in (1.93 m)	315 lb (143 kg)	Jul 20, 2023
Sterlin Brooks; Defensive line	Recruit ratings: Scout: Rivals: 247Sports: ESPN:				
Devyn Hidrogo; Safety	Franklin, TX	Franklin High School	6 ft 0.5 in (1.84 m)	185 lb (84 kg)	Dec 17, 2023
Devyn Hidrogo; Safety	Recruit ratings: Scout: Rivals: 247Sports: ESPN:				
Tristan Johnson; Defensive line	Hurst, TX	Bell High School	6 ft 2 in (1.88 m)	260 lb (120 kg)	Oct 21, 2023
Tristan Johnson; Defensive line	Recruit ratings: Scout: Rivals: 247Sports: ESPN:				
Kyle Lemmermann; Kicker	Southlake, TX	Southlake Carroll High School	6 ft 2 in (1.88 m)	195 lb (88 kg)	Jun 28, 2023
Kyle Lemmermann; Kicker	Recruit ratings: Scout: Rivals: 247Sports: ESPN:				
Ethan Craw; Punter	Sydney, AUS	ProKick Australia	6 ft 3 in (1.91 m)	210 lb (95 kg)	Dec 19, 2023
Ethan Craw; Punter	Recruit ratings: Scout: Rivals: 247Sports: ESPN:				

2024 Overall class rankings

Website	National rank	Conference rank	5 star recruits	4 star recruits	3 star recruits
ESPN	33rd	3rd	0	3	17
On3 Recruits	35th	3rd	0	3	17
Rivals	36th	3rd	0	5	13
247 Sports	31st	2nd	0	4	17

== Roster ==
2024 TCU Horned Frogs football team roster
Players
Coaches
Offense

Pos.	#	Name	Class
TE	0	D'Andre Rogers	Jr
QB	1	Hauss Hejny	Fr
RB	2	Trey Sanders	Sr
WR	3	Savion Williams	Sr
RB	4	Cam Cook	So
WR	6	Dylan Wright	Sr
WR	7	John Paul Richardson	Sr
TE	9	Drake Dabney	Sr
QB	10	Josh Hoover	So
WR	11	JoJo Earle	Sr
TE	12	Lafayette Kaiuway	Fr
WR	13	Major Everhart	So
WR	14	Jordyn Bailey	Fr
RB	15	Nate Palmer	Fr
WR	16	Braylon James	Fr
RB	17	Trent Battle	Jr
WR	18	Jack Bech	Sr
QB	19	Ken Seals	Jr
RB	20	Dominique Johnson	Jr
WR	21	Steel Tobin	Fr
RB	23	Derrick Carroll	Fr
RB	26	Jeremy Payne	Fr
QB	27	Hayden Parga	So
QB	29	Jacob Porter	So
RB	32	Brant Ahlfinger	So
WR	35	Colton Dobson	Jr
WR	36	Joe Laterza	Jr
RB	40	Franklin Estrada II	Jr
WR	41	Hunter Krepp	So
WR	43	Fletcher Fierro	Fr
TE	47	Jax Porter	So
RB	48	Joe Pitchford	Fr
TE	49	Cade Keith	Fr
OL	51	Coltin Deery	Jr
OL	52	James Brockermeyer	Jr
OL	53	Tobias Steppes	Fr
OL	54	Quinton Harris	So
OL	55	Remington Strickland	Jr
OL	56	Ben Taylor-Whitfield	So
OL	57	Samir Camacho	Fr
OL	58	Bless Harris	Sr
OL	59	Lucas Vargas-Diaz	Fr
OL	60	Cade Bennett	Jr
OL	61	Riley Self	Jr
OL	62	Carson Bruno	Jr
OL	64	Jackson McNeff	Fr
OL	65	Mike Stoker	Fr
OL	66	Wesley Harvey	Fr
OL	67	Hudson White	Jr
OL	69	Gannon Gaubert	So
OL	70	Ryan Hughes	Fr
OL	71	Michael Nichols	Sr
OL	76	Mitch Hodnett	Fr
OL	77	Robby Rochester	Jr
OL	78	Cooper Powers	Fr
WR	80	Sutton Lee	So
TE	81	Chase Curtis	Sr
WR	82	Dozie Ezukanma	Fr
WR	83	Keagan Cunningham	Jr
WR	84	Gekyle Baker	Fr
WR	85	Parker Clark	So
TE	86	Cole Snodgrass	Fr
WR	87	Blake Nowell	Sr
WR	88	Eric McAlister	Jr
WR	89	Austin Scheets	Jr

Defense

Pos.	#	Name	Class
LB	0	Shadrach Banks	Sr
S	1	Abe Camara	Sr
S	2	Jamel Johnson	So
LB	3	Kaleb Elarms-Orr	Jr
LB	4	Namdi Obiazor	Sr
CB	6	LaMareon James	Sr
CB	7	Channing Canada	Jr
LB	9	Marcel Brooks	Sr
LB	11	Devean Deal	Jr
LB	12	Terrence Cooks Jr.	Jr
CB	13	JaTravis Broughton	Sr
DB	14	Austin Jordan	Jr
S	15	Devyn Hidrogo	Fr
CB	17	Devondre McGee	Fr
S	18	Kaden McFadden	Fr
LB	19	Jonathan Bax	So
CB	20	Jevon McIver Jr.	Jr
S	21	Bud Clark	Jr
S	22	Jordan Lester	Fr
S	23	Richard Toney Jr.	Jr
CB	24	Avery Helm	Sr
S	25	Jaise Oliver	Sr
CB	26	Vernon Glover	So
DB	27	Cole Confessore	Fr
CB	28	Julian Knox	Fr
S	29	Cam Smith	Sr
LB	30	Kylan Salter	Fr
S	31	Jake Milliman	Fr
LB	33	Max Carroll	Fr
S	34	Judson Crockett	Fr
DL	35	Tristan Johnson	Fr
S	36	Sebastian Peterson	Fr
LB	37	Hudson Hooper	Fr
DL	40	Keviyan Huddleston	Fr
LB	41	TJ Willson	Jr
DL	42	Zachary Chapman	Fr
LB	43	Blake Baldwin	Jr
DE	43	Ty Witte	Fr
LB	44	Cooper McDonald	Sr
LB	46	Rhett Steppe	Fr
LB	47	Jake Boozer	Jr
LB	51	Luke Lingard	Jr
DL	54	NaNa Osfao-Mensah	Sr
DL	55	Blake Jones	So
LB	57	Johnny Hodges	Jr
DL	75	Connor Lingren	So
DL	90	Caleb Fox	Sr
DL	91	Tymon Mitchell	Sr
DL	92	Luke Dodds	Jr
DL	93	Hakeem Ajijolaiya	Sr
DL	94	Micheal Ibukun-Okeyode	So
DL	95	Markis Deal	Fr
DL	96	Travis Jackson	Fr
DL	97	Paul Oyewale	So
DL	98	Sterlin Brooks	Fr
DL	99	Avion Carter	Fr

Special teams

Pos.	#	Name	Class
P	31	Ethan Craw	Jr
K	34	Kyle Lemmermann	Fr
LS	42	Brent Matiscik	Sr
K	95	Caleb Sempebwa	So
LS	96	Cal Keeler	Fr
K/P	97	Easton Black	So
LS	98	Jax Thompson	Fr
K	99	Nate McCashland	Fr

Head coach

- Sonny Dykes

Coordinators/assistant coaches

- Kendal Briles (offensive coordinator/quarterbacks)
- Andy Avalos (defensive coordinator)
- A. J. Ricker (co-offensive coordinator/offensive line)
- Carlton Buckels (cornerbacks)
- Paul Gonzales (safeties)
- Malcolm Kelly (assistant head coach /outside receivers)
- Jamarkus McFarland (defensive line)
- Doug Meacham (inside wide receivers)
- Jimmy Smith (running backs)
- Ken Wilson (linebackers)
- Mark Tommerdahl (special assistant to the head coach)

Legend

- (C) Team captain
- (S) Suspended
- (I) Ineligible
- Injured
- Redshirt

Roster
Last update: September 30, 2024

== Schedule ==
Date	Time	Opponent	Site	TV	Result	Attendance
August 30	9:30 p.m.	at Stanford*	Stanford Stadium; Stanford, CA	ESPN	W 34–27	36,026
September 7	7:00 p.m.	LIU*	Amon G. Carter Stadium; Fort Worth, TX	ESPN+	W 45–0	44,063
September 14	6:30 p.m.	UCF	Amon G. Carter Stadium; Fort Worth, TX	FOX	L 34–35	48,889
September 21	4:00 p.m.	at SMU*	Gerald J. Ford Stadium; University Park, TX (rivalry)	The CW	L 42–66	33,168
September 28	2:30 p.m.	at Kansas	Arrowhead Stadium; Kansas City, MO	ESPN+	W 38–27	47,928
October 4	6:30 p.m.	Houston	Amon G. Carter Stadium; Fort Worth, TX	ESPN	L 19–30	44,211
October 19	9:30 p.m.	at Utah	Rice–Eccles Stadium; Salt Lake City, UT	ESPN	W 13–7	53,299
October 26	2:30 p.m.	Texas Tech^{†}	Amon G. Carter Stadium; Fort Worth, TX (rivalry)	FOX	W 35–34	42,144
November 2	7:00 p.m.	at Baylor	McLane Stadium; Waco, TX (rivalry)	ESPN2	L 34–37	44,171
November 9	6:00 p.m.	Oklahoma State	Amon G. Carter Stadium; Fort Worth, TX	FS1	W 38–13	45,348
November 23	2:00 p.m.	Arizona	Amon G. Carter Stadium; Fort Worth, TX	ESPN+	W 49–28	42,977
November 30	5:00 p.m.	at Cincinnati	Nippert Stadium; Cincinnati, OH	ESPN+	W 20–13	30,021
December 28	1:15 p.m.	vs. Louisiana*	University Stadium; Albuquerque, NM (New Mexico Bowl)	ESPN	W 34–3	22,827
*Non-conference game; ^{†}Homecoming; All times are in Central time

== Game summaries ==
=== at Stanford ===
Game One – TCU Horned Frogs (0–0) at Stanford Cardinal (0–0) – Game summary

Quarter	1	2	3	4	Total
Horned Frogs	7	3	10	14	34
Cardinal	7	10	0	10	27

at Stanford Stadium • Stanford, CA

- Date: August 30, 2024
- Game time: 9:30 p.m. CST
- Game weather: Sunny, 69 °F (21 °C)
- Game attendance: 36,026
- Referee: Jerry Magallanes
- TV announcers (ESPN): Dave Flemming (play-by-play), Brock Osweiler (analyst), and Stormy Buoanantony (sideline)

Game information

First quarter

- (7:57) STAN – Jackson Harris 3-yard pass from Ashton Daniels, Emmet Kenney kick (Drive: 13 plays, 89 yards, 6:59; Stanford 7-0)
- (1:16) TCU – Savion Williams 5-yard pass from Josh Hoover, Kyle Lemmermann kick (Drive: 13 plays, 75 yards, 6:41; Tied 7-7)

Second quarter

- (9:09) STAN – Ismael Cisse 2-yard pass from Justin Lamson, Emmet Kenney kick (Drive: 7 plays, 20 yards, 3:07; Stanford 14-7)
- (4:09) TCU – Kyle Lemmermann 22-yard field goal (Drive: 5 plays, 18 yards, 1:22; Stanford 14-10)
- (1:36) STAN – Emmet Kenney 35-yard field goal (Drive: 8 plays, 58 yards, 2:33; Stanford 17-10)

Third quarter

- (9:11) TCU – Kyle Lemmermann 42-yard field goal (Drive: 14 plays, 57 yards, 5:43; Stanford 17-13)
- (2:22) TCU – Josh Hoover 1-yard run, Kyle Lemmermann kick (Drive: 4 plays, 42 yards, 2:22; TCU 20-17)

Fourth quarter

- (6:57) STAN – Justin Lamson 1-yard run, Emmet Kenney kick (Drive: 11 plays, 79 yards, 4:46; Stanford 24-20)
- (3:13) TCU – Jack Bech 4-yard pass from Josh Hoover, Kyle Lemmermann kick (Drive: 8 plays, 74 yards, 3:39; TCU 27-24)
- (1:51) TCU – Cam Cook 7-yard run, Kyle Lemmermann kick (Drive: 4 plays, 19 yards, 0:23; TCU 34-24)
- (0:36) STAN – Emmet Kenney 45-yard field goal (Drive: 8 plays, 48 yards, 1:15; TCU 34-27)

Statistics	TCU	STAN
First downs	24	17
Total yards	457	286
Rushing yards	104	121
Passing yards	353	165
Passing: Comp–Att–Int	28–42–0	17–35–1
Time of possession	30:15	29:45

Team	Category	Player	Statistics
TCU	Passing	Josh Hoover	28/42, 353 yards, 2 TD
TCU	Rushing	Cam Cook	20 carries, 81 yards, 1 TD
TCU	Receiving	Jack Bech	6 receptions, 139 yards, 1 TD
Stanford	Passing	Ashton Daniels	17/35, 163 yards, 1 TD, 1 INT
Stanford	Rushing	Ashton Daniels	17 carries, 87 yards
Stanford	Receiving	Elic Ayomanor	7 receptions, 102 yards

=== vs LIU (FCS) ===
LIU Sharks (FCS) (0–1) vs TCU Horned Frogs (1–0) – Game summary

Quarter	1	2	3	4	Total
Sharks (FCS)	0	0	0	0	0
Horned Frogs	10	21	7	7	45

at Amon G. Carter Stadium • Fort Worth, TX

- Date: September 7, 2024
- Game time: 7:00 p.m. CST
- Game weather: Sunny • Temperature: 84 °F (29 °C) • Wind N 13 mph
- Game attendance: 44,063
- Referee: Cravonne Barrett
- TV announcers (ESPN+): Ted Emrich (play-by-play) and Dave Steckel (analyst)
- Box Score

Game information
First quarter
- TCU – Kyle Lemmermann 48-yard field goal, 11:35. Horned Frogs 3–0. Drive: 6 plays, 24 yards, 2:06.
- TCU – Cam Cook 1-yard run (Kyle Lemmermann kick), 7:45. Horned Frogs 10–0. Drive: 4 plays, 11 yards, 1:45.

Second quarter

- TCU – JoJo Earle 5-yard pass from Josh Hoover (Kyle Lemmermann kick), 13:37. Horned Frogs 17–0. Drive: 6 plays, 59 yards, 2:07.
- TCU – Dominique Johnson 2-yard run (Kyle Lemmermann kick), 7:25. Horned Frogs 24–0. Drive: 9 plays, 69 yards, 4:02.
- TCU – Cam Cook 12-yard run (Kyle Lemmermann kick), 1:52. Horned Frogs 31–0. Drive: 7 plays, 54 yards, 2:26.

Third quarter

- TCU – Cam Cook 5-yard run (Kyle Lemmermann kick), 12:45. Horned Frogs 38–0. Drive: 4 plays, 79 yards, 2:08.

Fourth quarter

- TCU – Chase Curtis 18-yard pass from Josh Hoover (Kyle Lemmermann kick), 11:29. Horned Frogs 45–0. Drive: 11 plays, 42 yards, 4:13.

Statistics	LIU	TCU
First downs	9	22
Total yards	127	425
Rushing yards	59	127
Passing yards	68	298
Passing: Comp–Att–Int	9–22–1	24–30–0
Time of possession	30:31	29:29

Team	Category	Player	Statistics
LIU	Passing	Luca Stanzani	8/18, 60 yds, INT
LIU	Rushing	Ethan Greenwood	7 rushes, 24 yds
LIU	Receiving	Aviyon Smith-Mack	2 receptions, 35 yds
TCU	Passing	Josh Hoover	20/25, 267 yds, 2 TD
TCU	Rushing	Cam Cook	13 rushes, 58 yds, 3 TD
TCU	Receiving	Savion Williams	5 receptions, 69 yds

=== vs UCF ===
UCF Knights (2–0) vs TCU Horned Frogs (2–0) – Game summary

Quarter	1	2	3	4	Total
Knights	0	7	13	15	35
Horned Frogs	14	7	10	3	34

at Amon G. Carter Stadium • Fort Worth, TX

- Date: September 14, 2024
- Game time: 6:30 p.m. CST
- Game weather: 95 °F (35 °C)
- Game attendance: 48,889
- Referee: David Alvarez
- TV announcers (FOX): Connor Onion (play-by-play) and Mark Helfrich (analyst)

Game information

First quarter

- TCU: Eric McAlister 14-yard touchdown pass from Josh Hoover (Kyle Lemmermann Kick), 9:38
- TCU: Savion Williams 18-yard touchdown pass from Josh Hoover (Kyle Lemmermann Kick), 3:18

Second quarter

- UCF: RJ Harvey 29-yard touchdown pass from KJ Jefferson (Colton Boomer Kick), 14:52
- TCU: Savion Williams 16-yard touchdown pass from Josh Hoover (Kyle Lemmermann Kick), 10:10

Third quarter

- TCU: Jack Bech 50-yard touchdown pass from Josh Hoover (Kyle Lemmermann Kick), 13:28
- UCF: RJ Harvey 1-yard touchdown run (PAT failed), 9:36
- TCU: Kyle Lemmermann 31-yard field goal, 5:03
- UCF: Kobe Hudson 27-yard touchdown pass from KJ Jefferson (Colton Boomer Kick), 4:01

Fourth quarter

- UCF: RJ Harvey 27-yard touchdown run (Jefferson pass to Harvey), 13:38
- TCU: Kyle Lemmermann 24-yard field goal, 8:44
- UCF: Kobe Hudson 20-yard touchdown pass from KJ Jefferson (Colton Boomer Kick), 0:36

Statistics	UCF	TCU
First downs	30	26
Total yards	519	460
Rushing yards	289	58
Passing yards	230	402
Passing: Comp–Att–Int	13–22–0	35–53–0
Time of possession	32:54	27:06

Team	Category	Player	Statistics
UCF	Passing	KJ Jefferson	13/22, 230 yards, 3 TD
UCF	Rushing	RJ Harvey	29 carries, 180 yards, TD
UCF	Receiving	Kobe Hudson	6 receptions, 145 yards, 2 TD
TCU	Passing	Josh Hoover	35/52, 402 yards, 4 TD
TCU	Rushing	Cam Cook	11 carries, 35 yards
TCU	Receiving	Jack Bech	9 receptions, 200 yards, TD

=== at SMU (rivalry) ===
Game Four – TCU Horned Frogs (2–1) at SMU Mustangs (2–1) – Game summary

Quarter	1	2	3	4	Total
Horned Frogs	0	21	7	14	42
Mustangs	17	24	18	7	66

at Gerald J. Ford Stadium, University Park, Texas

- Date: September 21
- Game time: 4:00 p.m. CDT
- Game weather: Sunny, 96 °F (36 °C)
- Game attendance: 33,168
- Referee: Kevin Boitmann
- TV announcers (The CW): Thom Brennaman (play-by-play), Max Browne (analyst), and Treavor Scales (sideline)

Game information
First quarter
- SMU – Collin Rogers 51-yard field goal, 9:52. Mustangs 3–0. Drive: 11 plays, 41 yards, 5:08.
- SMU – Brandon Crossley 51-yard fumble return (Collin Rogers kick), 7:02. Mustangs 10–0.
- SMU – Roderick Daniels Jr. 69-yard punt return (Collin Rogers kick), 6:10. Mustangs 17–0.

Second quarter

- TCU – Josh Hoover 1-yard run (Kyle Lemmermann kick), 14:51. Mustangs 17–7. Drive: 14 plays, 65 yards, 6:19.
- TCU – Cam Cook 7-yard run (Kyle Lemmermann kick), 11:24. Mustangs 17–14. Drive: 6 plays, 32 yards, 2:11.
- SMU – Brashard Smith 25-yard run (Collin Rogers kick), 8:01. Mustangs 24–14. Drive: 8 plays, 68 yards, 3:19.
- TCU – Eric McAlister 19-yard pass from Josh Hoover (Kyle Lemmermann kick), 5:00. Mustangs 24–21. Drive: 7 plays, 75 yards, 3:01.
- SMU – Jordan Hudson 10-yard pass from Kevin Jennings (Collin Rogers kick), 1:28. Mustangs 31–21. Drive: 11 plays, 60 yards, 3:24.
- SMU – Ahmaad Moses 60-yard interception return (Collin Rogers kick), 1:04. Mustangs 38–21.
- SMU – Collin Rogers 49-yard field goal, 0:00. Mustangs 41–21. Drive: 3 plays, 31 yards, 0:13.

Third quarter

- TCU – Jack Bech 46-yard pass from Josh Hoover (Kyle Lemmermann kick), 11:18. Mustangs 41–28. Drive: 7 plays, 90 yards, 3:29.
- SMU – Brashard Smith 24-yard pass from Kevin Jennings (Kevin Jennings pass to Brashard Smith), 9:27. Mustangs 49–28. Drive: 4 plays, 75 yards, 1:51.
- SMU – Brashard Smith 1-yard run (Collin Rogers kick), 8:34. Mustangs 56–28. Drive: 1 play, 1 yard, 0:04.
- SMU – Collin Rogers 45-yard field goal, 1:35. Mustangs 59–28. Drive: 9 plays, 47 yards, 3:52.

Fourth quarter

- TCU – Jack Bech 15-yard pass from Josh Hoover (Kyle Lemmermann kick), 12:15. Mustangs 59–35. Drive: 5 plays, 64 yards, 1:17.
- SMU – Brashard Smith 1-yard run (Collin Rogers kick), 8:23. Mustangs 66–35. Drive: 6 plays, 53 yards, 3:50.
- TCU – Jordyn Bailey 6-yard pass from Ken Seals (Kyle Lemmermann kick), 2:55. Mustangs 66–42. Drive: 10 plays, 59 yards, 5:21.

Statistics	TCU	SMU
First downs	24	23
Total yards	480	375
Rushing yards	65	238
Passing yards	415	137
Turnovers	5	1
Time of possession	32:20	27:40

Team	Category	Player	Statistics
TCU	Passing	Josh Hoover	28/43, 396 yards, 3 TD, 2 INT
TCU	Rushing	Cam Cook	14 rushes, 24 yards, TD
TCU	Receiving	Jack Bech	8 receptions, 166 yards, 2 TD
SMU	Passing	Kevin Jennings	14/19, 137 yards, 2 TD
SMU	Rushing	Brashard Smith	18 rushes, 127 yards, 3 TD
SMU	Receiving	Romello Brinson	1 reception, 51 yards

TCU head coach Sonny Dykes was ejected from the game at the start of the second half after receiving two unsportsmanlike conduct penalties.

=== at Kansas ===
TCU Horned Frogs (2–2) at Kansas Jayhawks (1–3) – Game summary

Quarter	1	2	3	4	Total
Horned Frogs	7	14	7	10	38
Jayhawks	14	3	7	3	27

at Arrowhead Stadium • Kansas City, MO

- Date: September 28, 2024
- Game time: 2:30 p.m. CDT
- Game weather: Sunny • Temperature: 81 °F (27 °C) • Wind: N 16 mph
- Game attendance: 47,928
- Referee: Michael VanderVelde
- TV announcers (ESPN+): Lowell Galindo (play-by-play), Fozzy Whittaker (analyst), and Shane Sparks (sideline)

Game information

First quarter

- (10:18) KAN – Luke Grimm 15-yard pass from Jalon Daniels, Tabor Allen kick (Drive: 4 plays, 54 yards, 2:02; Kansas 7–0)
- (8:29) TCU – Jack Bech 35-yard pass from Josh Hoover, Kyle Lemmermann kick (Drive: 5 plays, 92 yards, 1:47; Tied 7–7)
- (3:59) KAN – Devin Neal 2-yard run, Tabor Allen kick (Drive: 10 plays, 71 yards, 4:25; Kansas 14–7)

Second quarter

- (13:59) TCU – Cam Cook 3-yard run, Kyle Lemmermann kick (Drive: 12 plays, 75 yards, 5:10; Tied 14–14)
- (2:57) KAN – Tabor Allen 24-yard field goal (Drive: 4 plays, 0 yards, 0:58; Kansas 17–14)
- (0:17) TCU – Jack Bech 7-yard pass from Josh Hoover, Kyle Lemmermann kick (Drive: 11 plays, 75 yards, 2:40; TCU 21–17)

Third quarter

- (8:58) KAN – Daniel Hishaw 8-yard run, Tabor Allen kick (Drive: 11 plays, 75 yards, 6:02; Kansas 24–21)
- (1:46) TCU – JP Richardson 89-yard punt return, Kyle Lemmermann kick (TCU 28–24)

Fourth quarter

- (12:07) KAN – Tabor Allen 41-yard field goal (Drive: 10 plays, 42 yards, 4:39; TCU 28–27)
- (11:20) TCU – Eric McAlister 59-yard pass from Josh Hoover, Kyle Lemmermann kick (Drive: 2 plays, 75 yards, 0:47; TCU 35–27)
- (3:02) TCU – Kyle Lemmermann 29-yard field goal (Drive: 12 plays, 57 yards, 6:07; TCU 38–27)

Statistics	TCU	KU
First downs	26	20
Total yards	507	346
Rushing yards	151	167
Passing yards	356	179
Passing: Comp–Att–Int	28–37–2	15–34–1
Time of possession	28:24	31:36

Team	Category	Player	Statistics
TCU	Passing	Josh Hoover	28/37, 356 yards, 3 TD, 2 INT
TCU	Rushing	Jeremy Payne	8 carries, 65 yards
TCU	Receiving	Jack Bech	10 receptions, 131 yards, 2 TD
Kansas	Passing	Jalon Daniels	15/34, 179 yards, TD, INT
Kansas	Rushing	Daniel Hishaw	13 carries, 85 yards, TD
Kansas	Receiving	Luke Grimm	6 receptions, 85 yards, TD

=== vs Houston ===
Houston Cougars (1–4) vs TCU Horned Frogs (3–2) – Game summary

Quarter	1	2	3	4	Total
Cougars	7	17	0	6	30
Horned Frogs	0	6	6	7	19

at Amon G. Carter Stadium • Fort Worth, TX

- Date: October 4, 2024
- Game time: 6:30 p.m. CST
- Game weather: Sunny • Temperature: 88 °F (31 °C) • Wind: NE 9 mph
- Game attendance: 44,211
- Referee: Kevin Mar
- TV announcers (ESPN): Anish Shroff (play-by-play), Andre Ware (analyst), and Paul Carcaterra (sideline)

Game information

First quarter

- (5:29) HOU – Devan Williams 8-yard pass from Zeon Chriss, Jack Martin kick (Drive: 7 plays, 58 yards, 4:12; Houston 7–0)

Second quarter

- (13:38) HOU – Re'Shaun Sanford II 2-yard run, Jack Martin kick (Drive: 8 plays, 62 yards, 4:27; Houston 14–0)
- (4:55) HOU – Jack Martin 34-yard field goal (Drive: 7 plays, 36 yards, 3:34; Houston 17–0)
- (2:18) TCU – Savion Williams 21-yard pass from Josh Hoover (Drive: 7 plays, 77 yards, 2:31; Houston 17–6)
- (1:48) HOU – Zeon Chriss 71-yard run, Jack Martin kick (Drive: 2 plays, 75 yards, 0:30; Houston 24–6)

Third quarter

- (5:27) TCU – Jeremy Payne 2-yard run (Drive: 9 plays, 64 yards, 4:11; Houston 24–12)

Fourth quarter

- (13:35) HOU – Jack Martin 28-yard field goal (Drive: 8 plays, 25 yards, 5:00; Houston 27–12)
- (9:25) TCU – Jack Bech 29-yard pass from Josh Hoover, Kyle Lemmermann kick (Drive: 10 plays, 71 yards, 4:04; Houston 27–19)
- (1:58) HOU – Jack Martin 27-yard field goal (Drive: 14 plays, 66 yards, 7:27; Houston 30–19)

Statistics	HOU	TCU
First downs	19	20
Total yards	361	299
Rushing yards	207	66
Passing yards	154	233
Passing: Comp–Att–Int	17–20–0	23–37–2
Time of possession	36:53	23:07

Team	Category	Player	Statistics
Houston	Passing	Zeon Chriss	15/18, 141 yards, TD
Houston	Rushing	Zeon Chriss	11 carries, 97 yards, TD
Houston	Receiving	Maliq Carr	2 receptions, 39 yards
TCU	Passing	Josh Hoover	23/37, 233 yards, 2 TD, 2 INT
TCU	Rushing	Cam Cook	14 carries, 77 yards
TCU	Receiving	JP Richardson	9 receptions, 98 yards

=== at Utah ===
TCU Horned Frogs (3–3) at Utah Utes (4–2) – Game summary

Quarter	1	2	3	4	Total
Horned Frogs	0	10	3	0	13
Utes	0	0	7	0	7

at Rice-Eccles Stadium • Salt Lake City, UT

- Date: October 19, 2024
- Game time: 9:30 p.m.
- Game weather: Sunny • Temperature: 49 °F (9 °C) • Wind: NE 4 miles per hour (6.4 km/h)
- Game attendance: 53,299
- Referee: Mike McCabe
- TV announcers (ESPN): Dave Flemming (play-by-play), Brock Osweiler (analyst), and Sherree Burruss (sideline)

Game information

First quarter

No scoring plays

Second quarter

- (13:29) TCU – Kyle Lemmermann 23-yard field goal (Drive: 9 plays, 66 yards, 3:00; TCU 3–0)
- (7:00) TCU – Josh Hoover 1-yard run, Kyle Lemmermann kick (Drive: 8 plays, 79 yards, 3:51; TCU 10–0)

Third quarter

- (9:32) TCU – Kyle Lemmermann 28-yard field goal (Drive: 8 plays, 42 yards, 3:26; TCU 13–0)
- (6:12) UTAH – Money Parks 71-yard pass from Isaac Wilson, Cole Becker kick (Drive: 3 plays, 82 yards, 1:27; TCU 13–7)

Fourth quarter

No scoring plays

Statistics	TCU	UTAH
First downs	20	12
Total yards	395	267
Rushing yards	132	68
Passing yards	263	199
Passing: Comp–Att–Int	22–41–0	17–33–1
Time of possession	30:55	29:05

Team	Category	Player	Statistics
TCU	Passing	Josh Hoover	22/41, 263 yards
TCU	Rushing	Savion Williams	7 carries, 72 yards
TCU	Receiving	Eric McAlister	2 receptions, 57 yards
Utah	Passing	Isaac Wilson	17/33, 199 yards, TD, INT
Utah	Rushing	Micah Bernard	13 carries, 55 yards
Utah	Receiving	Money Parks	3 receptions, 79 yards, TD

=== vs Texas Tech (rivalry) ===
Texas Tech Red Raiders (5–2) vs TCU Horned Frogs (4–3) – Game summary

Quarter	1	2	3	4	Total
Red Raiders	3	14	14	3	34
Horned Frogs	14	0	7	14	35

at Amon G. Carter Stadium • Fort Worth, TX

- Date: October 26, 2024
- Game time: 2:30 p.m.
- Game weather: Sunny, 82 °F (28 °C)
- Game attendance: 42,144
- Referee: Stephen Baron
- TV announcers (FOX): Tim Brando (play-by-play), Devin Gardner (analyst), and Josh Sims (sideline)

Game information

First quarter

- (10:48) TCU – Savion Williams 35-yard run, Kyle Lemmermann kick (Drive: 9 plays, 75 yards, 4:12; TCU 7–0)
- (1:45) TTU – Gino Garcia 38-yard field goal (Drive: 7 plays, 21 yards, 3:15; TCU 7–3)
- (1:31) TCU – Savion Williams 75-yard pass from Josh Hoover, Kyle Lemmermann kick (Drive: 1 plays, 75 yards, 0:14; TCU 14–3)

Second quarter

- (13:09) TTU – Reese Burkhardt 4-yard run, Reese Burkhardt kick (Drive: 4 plays, 4 yards, 0:53; TCU 14–10)
- (10:44) TTU – Tahj Brooks 4-yard run, Gino Garcia kick (Drive: 3 plays, 59 yards, 0:550; TTU 17–14)

Third quarter

- (12:21) TTU – Coy Eakin 13-yard pass from Will Hammond, Reese Burkhardt kick (Drive: 6 plays, 78 yards, 2:33; TTU 24–14)
- (6:33) TTU – Will Hammond 4-yard run, Gino Garcia kick (Drive: 10 plays, 50 yards, 4:34; TTU 31–14)
- (6:33) TCU – Jeremy Payne 1-yard run, Kyle Lemmermann kick (Drive: 9 plays, 75 yards, 3:19; TTU 31–21)

Fourth quarter

- (11:13) TTU – Gino Garcia 24-yard field goal (Drive: 13 plays, 73 yards, 6:45; TTU 34–21)
- (8:42) TCU – DJ Rogers 8-yard pass from Josh Hoover, Kyle Lemmermann kick (Drive: 6 plays, 75 yards, 2:31; TTU 34–28)
- (5:10) TCU – Eric McAlister 84-yard pass from Josh Hoover, Kyle Lemmermann kick (Drive: 2 plays, 89 yards, 0:36; TCU 35–34)

Statistics	TTU	TCU
First downs	25	18
Total yards	438	461
Rushing yards	180	117
Passing yards	258	344
Passing: Comp–Att–Int	23–38–0	23–32–2
Time of possession	37:25	22:35

Team	Category	Player	Statistics
Texas Tech	Passing	Behren Morton	13/22, 137 yards
Texas Tech	Rushing	Tahj Brooks	30 carries, 121 yards, TD
Texas Tech	Receiving	Caleb Douglas	9 receptions, 140 yards
TCU	Passing	Josh Hoover	21/32, 344 yards, 3 TD, 2 INT
TCU	Rushing	Savion Williams	11 carries, 75 yards, TD
TCU	Receiving	Eric McAlister	1 reception, 84 yards, TD

=== at Baylor (rivalry) ===
TCU Horned Frogs (5–3) at Baylor Bears (4–4) – Game summary

Quarter	1	2	3	4	Total
Horned Frogs	7	10	10	7	34
Bears	7	6	7	17	37

at McLane Stadium • Waco, TX

- Date: November 2, 2024
- Game time: 7:00 p.m.
- Game weather: 76 °F (24 °C)
- Game attendance: 44,171
- Referee: David Alvarez
- TV announcers (ESPN2/Gridiron Radio): Mike Couzens (play-by-play), Brock Osweiler (analyst), and Stormy Buonantony (sideline)/Noah Britt (play-by-play), Jon Reynolds (analyst), and Patrick Johnson (sideline)

Game information

First quarter

- (6:42) TCU – Jordyn Bailey 8-yard Pass from Josh Hoover, (Kyle Lemmerman Kick) Horned Frogs 7–0. Drive: 7 plays, 95 yards, 3:01.
- (1:48) BAY – Bryson Washington 8-yard Rush (Isaiah Hankins Kick) Tied 7-7. Drive: 10 Plays, 65 yards, 4:54.

Second quarter

- (8:41) BAY – Bryson Washinton 40-yard Rush (Isaiah Hankins Kick NO GOOD) Bears 13-7. Drive: 4 Plays, 64 yards, 2:00
- (:50) TCU – Josh Hoover 1-yard Rush (Kyle Lemmerman Kick) Horned Frogs 17-13 Drive: 11 Plays, 68 Yards, 3:36.

Third quarter

- (5:18) TCU – Kyle Lemmerman 47-yard Field Goal Bears 13-10 Drive: 8 Plays, 47 yards, 3:23.
- (5:09) BAY – Dawson Pendergrass 1-yard Rush (Isaiah Hankins Kick) Tied 20-20 Drive: 9 Plays, 75 Yards, 3:55
- (:23) TCU – Jack Bech 6-yard Pass from Savion Willaims (Kyle Lemmerman Kick) Horned Frogs 27-20 Drive: 9 Plays, 75 Yards, 4:46

Fourth quarter

- (14:03) BAY – Bryson Washington 35-yard Rush (Isaiah Hankins Kick) Tied 27-27 Drive: 5 Plays, 75 Yards, 1:20
- (4:54) BAY – Bryson Washington 1-yard Rush (Isaiah Hankins Kick) Bears 34-27 Drive: 13 Plays, 81 Yards, 5:28
- (1:55) TCU – Jack Bech 24-yard Pass from Josh Hoover (Kyle Lemmerman Kick) Tied 34-34 Drive: 8 Plays, 75 Yards, 2:59
- (:00) BAY – Isaiah Hankins 33-yard Field Goal Bears 37-34 Drive: 11 Plays, 59 Yards, 1:55

Statistics	TCU	BAY
First downs	25	31
Total yards	444	499
Rushing yards	105	257
Passing yards	339	242
Passing: Comp–Att–Int	26–35–0	19–34–0
Time of possession	31:35	28:25

Team	Category	Player	Statistics
TCU	Passing	Josh Hoover	25/34, 333 yards, 2 TD
TCU	Rushing	Savion Williams	8 carries, 57 yards
TCU	Receiving	Savion Williams	8 receptions, 92 yards
Baylor	Passing	Sawyer Robertson	19/34, 242 yards
Baylor	Rushing	Bryson Washington	26 carries, 196 yards, 4 TD
Baylor	Receiving	Josh Cameron	4 receptions, 59 yards

=== vs Oklahoma State ===
Oklahoma State Cowboys (3–6) vs TCU Horned Frogs (5–4) – Game summary

Quarter	1	2	3	4	Total
Cowboys	0	0	6	7	13
Horned Frogs	10	14	7	7	38

at Amon G. Carter Stadium • Fort Worth, TX

- Date: November 9, 2024
- Game time: 6:00 p.m.
- Game weather: 67 °F (19 °C)
- Game attendance: 45,348
- Referee: Henry Johns
- TV announcers (FS1): Eric Collins (play-by-play) and Spencer Tillman (analyst)

Game information

First quarter

- (11:26) TCU – Kyle Lemmermann 32 yard field goal (Drive: 10 plays, 61 yards,3:34; TCU 3–0)
- (1:49) TCU – Cam Cook 18 yard rush, Kyle Lemmermann kick (Drive: 7 plays, 63 yards, 3:12; TCU 10–0)

Second quarter

- (6:30) TCU – Savion Williams 1 yard rush, Kyle Lemmermann kick (Drive: 11 plays, 68 yards, 5:03; TCU 17–0)
- (0:07) TCU – Josh Hoover 6 yard pass to Savion Williams, Kyle Lemmermann kick (Drive: 9 plays, 76 yards, 3:12; TCU 24–0)

Third quarter

- (10:24) OSU – Ollie Gordon II 2 yard rush (Drive: 11 plays, 78 yards, 4:27; OSU 24–6)
- (5:26) TCU – Cam Cook 4 yard rush, Kyle Lemmermann kick (Drive: 11 plays, 69 yards, 4:53; TCU 31–6)

Fourth quarter

- (13:52) OSU – Alan Bowman 8 yard pass to De'Zhaun Stribling, Logan Ward kick (Drive: 15 plays, 94 yards, 6:30; TCU 31–13)
- (13:02) TCU – Jordyn Bailey 59 yard rush, Kyle Lemmerman kick (Drive: 2 plays, 75 yards, 0:50; TCU 38–13)

Statistics	OKST	TCU
First downs	25	27
Total yards	368	468
Rushing yards	135	175
Passing yards	233	293
Passing: Comp–Att–Int	25–37–2	28–37–0
Time of possession	32:20	27:40

Team	Category	Player	Statistics
Oklahoma State	Passing	Alan Bowman	19/29, 141 yards, TD, INT
Oklahoma State	Rushing	Ollie Gordon II	25 carries, 121 yards, TD
Oklahoma State	Receiving	De'Zhaun Stribling	7 receptions, 101 yards, TD
TCU	Passing	Josh Hoover	26/35, 286 yards, TD
TCU	Rushing	Jordyn Bailey	1 carry, 59 yards, TD
TCU	Receiving	JP Richardson	7 receptions, 100 yards

=== vs Arizona ===
Arizona Wildcats (4–6) vs TCU Horned Frogs (6–4) – Game summary

Quarter	1	2	3	4	Total
Wildcats	7	6	0	15	28
Horned Frogs	14	7	14	14	49

at Amon G. Carter Stadium • Fort Worth, TX

- Date: November 23, 2024
- Game time: 2:00 p.m.
- Game weather: Sunny • Temperature: 73 °F (23 °C) • Wind: S 15 miles per hour (24 km/h)
- Game attendance: 42,977
- Referee: Cravonne Barrett
- TV announcers (ESPN+): Richard Cross (play-by-play) and Barrett Brooks (analyst)

Game information

First quarter

- (12:48) TCU – Trent Battle 4-yard run, Kyle Lemmermann kick (Drive: 5 plays, 37 yards, 2:06; TCU 7–0)
- (2:10) TCU – Savion Williams 1-yard run, Kyle Lemmermann kick (Drive: 5 plays, 61 yards, 2:58; TCU 14–0)
- (0:16) ARI – Chris Hunter 17-yard pass from Noah Fifita, Tyler Loop kick (Drive: 6 plays, 75 yards, 1:54; TCU 14–7)

Second quarter

- (8:08) ARI – Tyler Loop 53-yard field goal (Drive: 12 plays, 46 yards, 6:06; TCU 14–10)
- (1:55) ARI – Tyler Loop 43-yard field goal (Drive: 10 plays, 39 yards, 5:05; TCU 14–13)
- (0:13) TCU – Savion Williams 20-yard run, Kyle Lemmermann kick (Drive: 12 plays, 75 yards, 1:42; TCU 21–13)

Third quarter

- (10:13) TCU – Trent Battle 1-yard run, Kyle Lemmermann kick (Drive: 9 plays, 76 yards, 4:47; TCU 28–13)
- (7:51) TCU – JP Richardson 38-yard pass from Josh Hoover, Kyle Lemmermann kick (Drive: 2 plays, 34 yards, 0:51; TCU 35–13)

Fourth quarter

- (14:53) ARI – Chris Hunter 3-yard pass from Noah Fifita, Jeremiah Patterson pass (Drive: 15 plays, 75 yards, 7:58; TCU 35–21)
- (10:23) TCU – Cam Cook 6-yard run, Kyle Lemmermann kick (Drive: 9 plays, 75 yards, 4:30; TCU 42–21)
- (5:25) TCU – Jeremy Payne 30-yard run, Kyle Lemmermann kick (Drive: 5 plays, 68 yards, 2:31; TCU 49–21)
- (1:00) ARI – Sterling Lane II 70-yard fumble recovery, Tyler Loop kick (TCU 49–28)

Statistics	ARIZ	TCU
First downs	16	24
Total yards	325	450
Rushing yards	38	147
Passing yards	287	303
Passing: Comp–Att–Int	30–47–1	21–29–1
Time of possession	31:28	28:32

Team	Category	Player	Statistics
Arizona	Passing	Noah Fifita	29/44, 284 yards, 2 TD, INT
Arizona	Rushing	Quali Conley	13 carries, 42 yards
Arizona	Receiving	Tetairoa McMillan	9 receptions, 115 yards
TCU	Passing	Josh Hoover	19/26, 252 yards, TD, INT
TCU	Rushing	Savion Williams	9 carries, 80 yards, 2 TD
TCU	Receiving	JP Richardson	6 receptions, 107 yards, TD

=== at Cincinnati ===
TCU Horned Frogs (7–4) at Cincinnati Bearcats (5–6) – Game summary

Quarter	1	2	3	4	Total
Horned Frogs	7	13	0	0	20
Bearcats	0	0	7	6	13

at Nippert Stadium • Cincinnati, OH

- Date: November 30, 2024
- Game time: 5:00 p.m.
- Game weather: Temperature: 32 °F (0 °C), Weather: Cloudy, Wind: 0 miles per hour (0 km/h)
- Game attendance: 30,021
- Referee: Mike McCabe
- TV announcers (ESPN+): Richard Cross (play-by-play) and Barrett Brooks (analyst)

Game information

First quarter

- (11:18) TCU – Savion Williams 2-yard run, Kyle Lemmermann kick (Drive: 7 plays, 29 yards, 2:50; TCU 7–0)

Second quarter

- (14:47) TCU – Kyle Lemmermann 27-yard field goal (Drive: 8 plays, 46 yards, 2:58; TCU 10–0)
- (11:12) CIN – Corey Kiner 1-yard run, Nathan Hawks kick (Drive: 7 plays, 75 yards, 3:35; TCU 10-7)
- (7:34) TCU – Savion Williams 2-yard run, Kyle Lemmermann kick (Drive: 7 plays, 65 yards, 3:38; TCU 14–7)
- (3:34) TCU – Kyle Lemmermann 35-yard field goal (Drive: 7 plays, 17 yards, 1:58; TCU 20–7)

Third quarter

No scoring plays

Fourth quarter

- (5:15) CIN – Brendan Sorsby 8-yard run, (Drive: 12 plays, 94 yards, 3:51; TCU 20–13)

Statistics	TCU	CIN
First downs	17	23
Total yards	336	373
Rushing yards	124	213
Passing yards	212	160
Passing: Comp–Att–Int	18–35–1	21–35–1
Time of possession	28:29	31:31

Team	Category	Player	Statistics
TCU	Passing	Josh Hoover	18/35, 212 yards, INT
TCU	Rushing	Hauss Hejny	8 carries, 41 yards
TCU	Receiving	Blake Nowell	3 receptions, 75 yards
Cincinnati	Passing	Brendan Sorsby	21/34, 160 yards, INT
Cincinnati	Rushing	Corey Kiner	23 carries, 117 yards, TD
Cincinnati	Receiving	Xzavier Henderson	3 receptions, 46 yards

=== vs Louisiana (New Mexico Bowl) ===
2024 New Mexico Bowl
Louisiana Ragin' Cajuns (10–3) vs TCU Horned Frogs (8–4) – Game summary

Quarter	1	2	3	4	Total
Ragin' Cajuns	0	0	0	3	3
Horned Frogs	14	13	7	0	34

at University Stadium • Albuquerque, New Mexico

- Date: Saturday, December 28, 2024
- Game time: 1:15 p.m. CST
- Game weather: Sunny • Temperature: 50 °F (10 °C) • Wind: 1 mph (1.6 km/h) northeast
- Game attendance: 22,827
- Referee: Charles Lamertina
- TV announcers (ESPN/Bowl Season Radio): Mark Jones (play-by-play), Roddy Jones (analyst), and Lauren Sisler (sideline)/Paul Loeffler (play-by-play) and Dontrell Moore (analyst)

Game information

First Quarter

- (10:11) TCU – DJ Rogers 3 yard pass from Josh Hoover, Kyle Lemmermann kick (Drive: 11 plays, 75 yards, 4:49; TCU 7–0)
- (2:23) TCU – Eric McAlister 1 yard pass from Josh Hoover, Kyle Lemmermann kick (Drive: 10 plays, 63 yards, 5:04; TCU 14–0)

Second Quarter

- (11:06) TCU – Kyle Lemmermann 45 yard field goal (Drive: 10 plays, 30 yards, 4:42; TCU 17–0)
- (5:34) TCU – Kyle Lemmermann 22 yard field goal (Drive: 9 plays, 60 yards, 2:51; TCU 20–0)
- (0:57) TCU – JP Richardson 20 yard pass from Josh Hoover, Kyle Lemmermann kick (Drive: 4 plays, 28 yards, 1:27; TCU 27–0)

Third Quarter

- (9:26) TCU – Blake Nowell 20 yard pass from Josh Hoover, Kyle Lemmermann kick (Drive: 4 plays, 54 yards, 1:36; TCU 34–0)

Fourth Quarter

- (12:05) UL – Kenneth Almendares 24 yard field goal (Drive: 9 plays, 24 yards, 3:46; TCU 34–3)

Statistics	ULL	TCU
First downs	13	19
Total yards	209	367
Rushing yards	114	110
Passing yards	95	257
Passing: Comp–Att–Int	11–26–2	21–34–1
Time of possession	29:17	30:43

Team	Category	Player	Statistics
Louisiana	Passing	Ben Wooldridge	7/20, 61 yards, INT
Louisiana	Rushing	Zylan Perry	11 carries, 49 yards
Louisiana	Receiving	Jacob Bernard	1 reception, 25 yards
TCU	Passing	Josh Hoover	20/32, 252 yards, 4 TD, INT
TCU	Rushing	Trent Battle	9 carries, 42 yards
TCU	Receiving	Eric McAlister	8 receptions, 87 yards, TD
