= 2024 Louisiana Ragin' Cajuns football team =

American college football season

2024 Louisiana Ragin' Cajuns football

Sun Belt West Division champion

Sun Belt Championship, L 3–31 vs. Marshall

New Mexico Bowl, L 3–34 vs. TCU
- Conference: Sun Belt Conference
- West Division
- Record: 10–4 (7–1 Sun Belt)
- Head coach: Michael Desormeaux (3rd season)
- Associate head coach: Jorge Munoz (3rd season)
- Offensive coordinator: Tim Leger (4th season)
- Offensive scheme: Spread
- Defensive coordinator: Jim Salgado (1st season)
- Base defense: 4–3
- Home stadium: Cajun Field

2024 Sun Belt Conference football standings
	Conf.			Overall
Team	W		L	W		L
East Division
Marshall xy$	7	–	1	10	–	3
Georgia Southern	6	–	2	8	–	5
James Madison	4	–	4	9	–	4
Old Dominion	4	–	4	5	–	7
Coastal Carolina	3	–	5	6	–	7
Appalachian State	3	–	5	5	–	6
Georgia State	1	–	7	3	–	9
West Division
Louisiana xy	7	–	1	10	–	4
Texas State	5	–	3	8	–	5
Arkansas State	5	–	3	8	–	5
South Alabama	5	–	3	7	–	6
Louisiana–Monroe	3	–	5	5	–	7
Troy	3	–	5	4	–	8
Southern Miss	0	–	8	1	–	11
Championship: Marshall 31, Louisiana 3
$ – Conference champion; x – Division champion/co-champions; y – Championship game participant

The 2024 Louisiana Ragin' Cajuns football team represented the University of Louisiana at Lafayette in the Sun Belt Conference's West Division during the 2024 NCAA Division I FBS football season. The Ragin' Cajuns were led by Michael Desormeaux in his third year as the head coach. The Ragin' Cajuns played their home games at Cajun Field, located in Lafayette, Louisiana.

The Cajuns compiled a 10–2 regular-season overall record on the season, the most successful under Desormeaux's tenure as head coach. The Cajuns also played in the Sun Belt Conference Football Championship Game for the fifth year out of the seven total seasons the game has been played. In the postseason, the Cajuns made their first appearance in the New Mexico Bowl, becoming the first Sun Belt team to play in that bowl.

== Preseason ==
=== Media poll ===
In the Sun Belt preseason coaches' poll, the Ragin' Cajuns were picked to finish third place in the West division.

Offensive lineman AJ Gillie and returner Zylan Perry were awarded to be in the preseason All-Sun Belt first team offense and special teams, respectively. Defensive lineman Jordan Lawson, linebacker KC Ossai, and defensive back Tyrone Lewis Jr. were named to the second team.

== Personnel ==
2024 Louisiana Ragin' Cajuns football team roster
Players
Coaches
Offense

Pos.	#	Name	Class
TE	0	Terrance Carter	So
QB	2	D'Wayné Winfield Williams	Fr
WR	3	Harvey Broussard	So
WR	4	Jacob Bernard	Sr
QB	6	Sam Altmann	Fr
RB	7	Elijah Davis	Fr
WR	8	Rahji Dennis	Fr
WR	9	Lance LeGendre	Sr
QB	10	Ben Wooldridge	Sr
WR	11	Dalen Cambre	Sr
WR	13	Charles Robertson	So
WR	15	Robert Williams	Jr
QB	16	Daniel Beale	Fr
QB	17	Adryan Lara	So
QB	18	Chandler Fields	Sr
WR	19	Dale Martin	Jr
RB	20	Dre'Lyn Washington	Jr
RB	21	Zylan Perry	So
RB	22	Chaz Ward	Sr
WR	23	Landon Strother	Fr
RB	24	Steven Blanco	Fr
RB	25	Hutch Swilley	Fr
RB	27	Kendrell Williams	Jr
WR	28	KeDarius Wade	Fr
RB	29	Keilan Sherman	Fr
WR	30	Trayv'on Culbert	Jr
WR	33	Landon Baptiste	Fr
WR	34	Christian Pillette	Fr
RB	41	Tylon Citizen	Fr
TE	44	Teddy Gawlik	Fr
OL	50	Cooper Fordham	Fr
OL	52	Ryder Bentley	Fr
OL	53	AJ Gillie	Sr
OL	54	Jarrick Nedie	Fr
OL	55	Landon Burton	Sr
OL	57	Zay Alexander	Fr
OL	59	Andrew Martinez	Fr
OL	60	Jackson Hammond	Fr
OL	62	Ethan Clark	So
OL	63	Ryan Ebrahim	Jr
OL	64	Bryant Williams	So
OL	65	Xzavier Brown	Fr
OL	67	John Bragg	Fr
OL	70	Jax Harrington	Sr
OL	71	George Jackson	Jr
OL	72	J'Marion Gooch	So
OL	73	Djay Williams	Fr
OL	74	Peyton Polk	Fr
OL	75	Kaden Moreau	So
OL	76	Matthew Broussard	Fr
OL	77	King McGowen	Sr
OL	78	Quinton Williams	So
OL	79	Mackey Maillho	Jr
WR	80	Tavion Smith	Sr
WR	81	Jaydon Johnson	So
TE	82	Rhett Guidry	Jr
TE	83	Grant Miller	So
WR	85	Cullen Charles	Fr
TE	86	Ty Stamey	Fr
TE	88	Caden Jensen	Fr

Defense

Pos.	#	Name	Class
DL	0	Jordan Lawson	Jr
DL	2	Antoine Baylis	Sr
S	3	Tyrone Lewis Jr.	Sr
S	4	Tyree Skipper	Jr
LB	6	Terrence Williams	Jr
CB	7	Courtline Flowers (S)	Jr
LB	8	K. C. Ossai	Sr
DL	9	Mason Narcisse	Sr
CB	10	Shadwel Nkuba II	Jr
CB	11	Caleb Anderson	Jr
CB	13	Amir McDaniel	Sr
S	15	Ja'Corian Norris	Fr
LB	16	Kailep Edwards	Jr
OLB	17	Ashley Williams	Fr
S	18	Micaiah Bivines	Jr
OLB	19	Cameron Whitfield	Jr
S	20	Jalen Clark	Jr
CB	21	Keyon Martin	Sr
LB	22	Jaden Dugger	Jr
CB	23	Jeremiah Moses	Fr
CB	24	Lorenzell Dubose	So
LB	25	Carmycah Glass	So
CB	26	Justin Agu	Jr
S	27	Key'Savalyn Barnes	Jr
S	28	Kody Jackson	Fr
CB	29	Denim Day	So
LB	30	Ethan Veal	Fr
LB	31	Trey Fite	So
CB	33	Avery Demery	Fr
CB	34	Calep Jacob	So
S	35	Collin Jacob	So
S	36	Maurion Eleam	So
LB	36	Conor McPherson	Fr
LB	37	Micah Johnson	Fr
S	37	Bryant Merriwether	Fr
LB	38	Na'Tori Brown	Fr
CB	39	Cedric Moore	Fr
DB	40	EJ McDonald	Fr
DL	41	Chase Edwards	Fr
S	43	Aaron Wright	Jr
LB	44	Jake St. Andre	So
LB	45	Caleb Kibodi	Jr
S	45	Lake Bates	Fr
LB	46	Emiliano Soldevilla	Fr
S	47	Kerry Wilson	So
S	49	Travin Moore	Fr
LB	51	Hayden Darbonne	Fr
LB	52	Ben Bienvenu	Fr
DE	54	KJ Riley III	Fr
DL	68	Fitzgerald West Jr.	So
OLB	80	Lester Jones	Fr
LB	82	Jaden Breaux	Fr
DL	90	Kadarius Miller	Sr
DL	91	Priest Ashe	Fr
DL	93	Kyron Mims	Sr
DL	94	Timahj Jones	Fr
DL	95	Maxie Baudoin IV	Jr
DL	96	James Klingberg	Fr
DL	97	Lance Williams	So
DL	98	Jeremiah Holts	Fr
DL	99	Ashton Wright	Fr

Special teams

Pos.	#	Name	Class
LS	39	Carter Milliron	Jr
K	40	Logan Klotz	Jr
LS	40	Hunter Sims	Jr
K	45	Kenneth Almendares	Sr
P	50	Brayden Guilbeau	Fr
P/K	51	Braxton Guilbeau	Jr
P	92	Nathan Torney	Jr
K	95	Tony Sterner	So

Head coach

- Michael Desormeaux (Louisiana)

Coordinators/assistant coaches

- Tim Leger (McNeese State)
  Offensive coordinator/recruiting coordinator/WR
- Jim Salgado (Hofstra)
  Defensive coordinator/S
- Jorge Munoz (Bethany)
  Associate head coach/TE
- George Barlow (Marshall)
  Secondary coach
- Matt Bergeron (Lamar)
  Running backs
- Steve Farmer (Illinois State)
  Offensive linemen/run game coordinator
- Mike Giuliani (SUNY Cortland)
  Outside linebackers
- Bryant Ross (Alabama A&M)
  Assistant OL
- Scott Stoker (Northwestern State)
  Inside linebackers
- Dennis Thomas (South Carolina)
  Defensive linemen

Legend

- (C) Team captain
- (S) Suspended
- (I) Ineligible
- Injured
- Redshirt

Roster
Last update: 13 November 2024

== Schedule ==
The football schedule was announced on March 1, 2024.

Date	Time	Opponent	Site	TV	Result	Attendance
August 31	7:00 p.m.	Grambling State*	Cajun Field; Lafayette, LA	ESPN+	W 40–10	23,107
September 7	6:00 p.m.	at Kennesaw State*	Fifth Third Bank Stadium; Kennesaw, GA	ESPN+	W 34–10	11,040
September 21	11:00 a.m.	Tulane*	Cajun Field; Lafayette, LA	ESPNU	L 33–41	22,534
September 28	2:30 p.m.	at Wake Forest*	Allegacy Federal Credit Union Stadium; Winston-Salem, NC	ACCN	W 41–38	31,061
October 5	6:00 p.m.	at Southern Miss	M. M. Roberts Stadium; Hattiesburg, MS	ESPN+	W 23–13	24,041
October 12	6:30 p.m.	Appalachian State	Cajun Field; Lafayette, LA	ESPN+	W 34–24	14,058
October 19	11:00 a.m.	at Coastal Carolina	Brooks Stadium; Conway, SC	ESPNU	W 34–24	17,812
October 29	6:30 p.m.	at Texas State	UFCU Stadium; San Marcos, TX	ESPN2	W 23–17	16,831
November 9	4:00 p.m.	Arkansas State^{†}	Cajun Field; Lafayette, LA	ESPN+	W 55–19	16,451
November 16	6:00 p.m.	South Alabama	Cajun Field; Lafayette, LA	ESPN+	L 22–24	16,063
November 23	4:00 p.m.	Troy	Cajun Field; Lafayette, LA	ESPN+	W 51–30	15,501
November 30	11:00 a.m.	at Louisiana–Monroe	Malone Stadium; Monroe, LA (Battle on the Bayou)	ESPNU	W 37–23	15,006
December 7	6:30 p.m.	Marshall	Cajun Field; Lafayette, LA (Sun Belt Championship Game)	ESPN	L 3–31	20,067
December 28	1:15 p.m.	vs. TCU*	University Stadium; Albuquerque, NM (New Mexico Bowl)	ESPN	L 3–34	22,827
*Non-conference game; ^{†}Homecoming; Rankings from AP Poll and CFP Rankings released prior to game; All times are in Eastern time

== Game summaries ==
=== Grambling State (FCS) ===
Game One – Grambling State Tigers (FCS) (0–0) at Louisiana Ragin' Cajuns (0–0) – Game summary

Quarter	1	2	3	4	Total
Tigers (FCS)	0	0	7	3	10
Ragin' Cajuns	7	23	7	3	40

at Cajun Field • Lafayette, Louisiana

- Date: Saturday August 31, 2024
- Game time: 7:00 p.m. CDT
- Game weather: Sunny
- Game attendance: 23,107
- Referee: Ted Pitts
- TV announcers (ESPN+): Dan McDonald (play-by-play) and Eric Mouton (analyst)

Game information

First quarter

- (9:04) LA – Dre'lyn Washington 6-yard run, Kenneth Almendares kick (Drive: 8 plays, 82 yards, 3:24; Louisiana 7–0)

Second quarter

- (13:30) LA – Harvey Broussard 13-yard pass from Ben Wooldridge, Kenneth Almendares kick (Drive: 12 plays, 69 yards, 6:50; Louisiana 14–0)
- (10:07) LA – Caleb Kibodi 50-yard interception, Kenneth Almendares kick (Louisiana 21–0)
- (4:06) LA – Tavion Smith 56-yard pass from Ben Wooldridge (Drive: 6 plays, 89 yards, 2:59; Louisiana 27–0)
- (0:39) LA – Kenneth Almendares 41-yard field goal (Drive: 6 plays, 24 yards, 1:09; Louisiana 30–0)

Third quarter

- (8:46) LA – Terrance Carter 10-yard pass from Ben Wooldridge, Kenneth Almendares kick (Drive: 7 plays, 79 yards, 3:00; Louisiana 37–0)
- (4:35) GRAM – Ke'Travion Hargrove 1-yard run, Reed Harradine kick (Drive: 9 plays, 75 yards, 4:11; Louisiana 37–7)
- (3:33) LA – Tony Sterner 27-yard field goal (Drive: 10 plays, 70 yards, 5:52; Louisiana 40–7)

Fourth quarter

- (1:55) GRAM – Reed Harradine 50-yard field goal (Drive: 5 plays, 32 yards, 1:26; Louisiana 40–10)

Statistics	GRAM	LA
First downs	12	24
Plays–yards	48–241	66–481
Rushes–yards	20–75	28–118
Passing yards	166	363
Passing: Comp–Att–Int	19–28–1	29–38–1
Time of possession	25:42	34:18

Team	Category	Player	Statistics
Grambling State	Passing	Myles Crawley	19/28, 166 yards, INT
Grambling State	Rushing	Ke'Travion Hargrove	12 carries, 61 yards, TD
Grambling State	Receiving	Nick Howard	5 receptions, 68 yards
Louisiana	Passing	Ben Wooldridge	25/33, 308 yards, 3 TD, INT
Louisiana	Rushing	Zylan Perry	5 carries, 45 yards
Louisiana	Receiving	Harvey Broussard	4 receptions, 76 yards, TD

=== at Kennesaw State ===
Game Two – Louisiana Ragin Cajuns (1–0) vs Kennesaw State Owls (0–1) – Game summary

Quarter	1	2	3	4	Total
Ragin Cajuns	0	20	14	0	34
Owls	7	0	0	3	10

at Fifth Third Bank Stadium • Kennesaw, Georgia

- Date: September 7th
- Game time: 7:00 p.m. EDT
- Game weather: Sunny, 78 °F (26 °C)
- Game attendance: 11,040
- Referee: Marshall Lewis
- TV announcers (ESPN+): Jay Walker (play-by-play), Cody Junot (analyst) and Dawson Eiserloh (sideline)

Game information

First quarter

- (6:19) KSU – Preston Daniels 3 yard run, Austin Welch kick (Drive: 16 plays, 74 yards, 8:32; KENN 0–7)

Second quarter

- (13:55) LA – Kenneth Almendares 30 yard field goal (Drive: 13 plays, 74 yards, 7:15; KENN 3–7)
- (6:02) LA – Elijah Davis 1 yard run, Kenneth Almendares kick (Drive: 10 plays, 80 yards, 4:47; ULL 10–7)
- (1:54) LA – Zylan Perry 19 yard run, Kenneth Almendares kick (Drive: 4 plays, 85 yards, 1:26; ULL 17–7)
- (0:00) LA – Kenneth Almendares 26 yard field goal (Drive: 3 plays, 1 yard, 0:21; ULL 20–7)

Third quarter

- (9:02) LA – Robert Williams 3 yard pass from Ben Wooldridge, Kenneth Almendares kick (Drive: 5 plays, 71 yards, 2:44; ULL 27–7)
- (0:49) LA – Elijah Davis 1 yard run, Kenneth Almendares kick (Drive: 10 plays, 79 yards, 6:03; ULL 34–7)

Fourth quarter

- (7:30) KSU – Austin Welch 30 yard field goal (Drive: 14 plays, 63 yards, 8:12; ULL 34–10)

Statistics	LA	KSU
First downs	21	12
Plays–yards	454	204
Rushes–yards	257	111
Passing yards	197	93
Passing: comp–att–int	17-22-0	7-13-0
Turnovers	0	0
Time of possession	32:04	27:56

Team	Category	Player	Statistics
Louisiana	Passing	Ben Wooldridge	15/19, 189 yards, 1 TD
Louisiana	Rushing	Zylan Perry	10 carries, 10 yards, 1 TD
Louisiana	Receiving	Jacob Bernard	4 receptions, 84 yards
Kennesaw State	Passing	Davis Bryson	7/13, 93 yards
Kennesaw State	Rushing	Michael Benefield	9 carries, 31 yards
Kennesaw State	Receiving	Tykeem Wallace	2 receptions, 34 yards

=== Tulane ===
Game Three – Tulane Green Wave (1–2) at Louisiana Ragin' Cajuns (2–0) – Game summary

Quarter	1	2	3	4	Total
Green Wave	0	17	21	3	41
Ragin' Cajuns	7	6	13	7	33

at Cajun Field • Lafayette, Louisiana

- Date: September 21st
- Game time: 11:00 a.m. CDT
- Game weather: Sunny • Temperature: 92 °F (33 °C) • Wind: SE at 4 miles per hour (6.4 km/h)
- Game attendance: 22,534
- Referee: Trennis Livingston
- TV announcers (ESPNU): Mike Corey (play-by-play) and Rene Ingoglia (analyst)

Game information

First quarter

- (7:26) LA – Ben Wooldridge 1-yard run, Kenneth Almendares kick (Drive: 7 plays, 79 yards, 3:53; Louisiana 7–0)

Second quarter

- (14:57) TULN – Ty Thompson 2-yard run, Ethan Head kick (Drive: 15 plays, 65 yards, 7:29; Tied 7–7)
- (9:14) LA – Kenneth Almendares 20-yard field goal (Drive: 11 plays, 72 yards, 5:43; Louisiana 10–7)
- (2:02) TULN – Ethan Head 37-yard field goal (Drive: 13 plays, 59 yards, 7:08; Tied 10–10)
- (1:40) TULN – Jack Tchienchou 38-yard interception, Ethan Head kick (Tulane 17–10)
- (0:03) LA – Kenneth Almendares 31-yard field goal (Drive: 12 plays, 61 yards, 1:37; Tulane 17–13)

Third quarter

- (14:47) TULN – Rayshawn Pleasant 94-yard kickoff return, Ethan Head kick (Tulane 24–13)
- (13:06) LA – Caden Jensen 1-yard pass from Ben Wooldridge (Drive: 3 plays, 75 yards, 1:41; Tulane 24–19)
- (8:57) TULN – Reggie Brown 33-yard pass from Darian Mensah, Ethan Head kick (Drive: 8 plays, 73 yards, 4:05; Tulane 31–19)
- (6:42) LA – Terrance Carter 36-yard pass from Ben Wooldridge, Kenneth Almendares kick (Drive: 4 plays, 72 yards, 2:04; Tulane 31–26)
- (3:11) TULN – Makhi Hughes 1-yard run, Ethan Head kick (Drive: 6 plays, 73 yards, 3:26; Tulane 38–26)

Fourth quarter

- (13:17) LA – Ben Wooldridge 2-yard run, Kenneth Almendares kick (Drive: 9 plays, 75 yards, 4:54; Tulane 38–33)
- (5:42) TULN – Ethan Head 38-yard field goal (Drive: 13 plays, 55 yards, 7:35; Tulane 41–33)

Statistics	TULN	LA
First downs	18	22
Plays–yards	64–355	63–413
Rushes–yards	47–272	28–175
Passing yards	83	238
Passing: Comp–Att–Int	11–17–0	19–35–2
Time of possession	33:57	26:03

Team	Category	Player	Statistics
Tulane	Passing	Darian Mensah	11/17, 83 yards, TD
Tulane	Rushing	Makhi Hughes	23 carries, 166 yards, TD
Tulane	Receiving	Reggie Brown	1 reception, 33 yards, TD
Louisiana	Passing	Ben Wooldridge	19/34, 238 yards, 2 TD, 2 INT
Louisiana	Rushing	Bill Davis	9 carries, 103 yards
Louisiana	Receiving	Terrance Carter	4 receptions, 79 yards, TD

=== at Wake Forest ===
Game Four – Louisiana Ragin' Cajuns (2–1) vs Wake Forest Demon Deacons (1–2) – Game summary

Quarter	1	2	3	4	Total
Ragin' Cajuns	14	7	10	10	41
Demon Deacons	3	14	14	7	38

at Allegacy Federal Credit Union Stadium, Winston-Salem, North Carolina

- Date: Saturday September 28, 2024
- Game time: 2:30 PM
- Game weather: Cloudy • Temperature: 77 °F (25 °C) • Wind: SW at 9 miles per hour (14 km/h)
- Game attendance: 31,061
- Referee: Nate Black
- TV announcers (ACCN): Chris Cotter (play-by-play), Rocky Boiman (analyst) and Coley Harvey (sideline)

Game information

First quarter

- (7:56) LA – Tavion Smith 2-yard pass from Ben Wooldridge, Kenneth Almendares kick (Drive: 10 plays, 70 yards, 5:54; Louisiana 7–0)
- (2:31) WAKE – Matthew Dennis 39-yard field goal (Drive: 13 plays, 54 yards, 5:25; Louisiana 7–3)
- (0:56) LA – Ben Wooldridge 1-yard run, Kenneth Almendares kick (Drive: 4 plays, 75 yards, 1:35; Louisiana 14–3)

Second quarter

- (4:28) WAKE – Tate Carney 1-yard run, Matthew Dennis kick (Drive: 10 plays, 65 yards, 5:28; Louisiana 14–10)
- (1:18) LA – Lance LeGendre 20-yard pass from Ben Wooldridge, Kenneth Almendares kick (Drive: 8 plays, 75 yards, 3:10; Louisiana 21–10)
- (0:15) WAKE – Deuce Alexander 3-yard pass from Hank Bachmeier, Matthew Dennis kick (Drive: 6 plays, 80 yards, 0:57; Louisiana 21–17)

Third quarter

- (10:22) LA – Kenneth Almendares 50-yard field goal (Drive: 11 plays, 42 yards, 4:38; Louisiana 24–17)
- (8:19) WAKE – Demond Claiborne 60-yard run, Matthew Dennis kick (Drive: 5 plays, 82 yards, 1:59; Tied 24–24)
- (6:49) LA – Lance LeGendre 48-yard pass from Ben Wooldridge, Kenneth Almendares kick (Drive: 4 plays, 75 yards, 1:30; Louisiana 31–24)
- (0:39) WAKE – Tate Carney 1-yard run, Matthew Dennis kick (Drive: 12 plays, 75 yards, 6:10; Tied 31–31)

Fourth quarter

- (8:07) LA – Bill Davis 2-yard run, Kenneth Almendares kick (Drive: 4 plays, 38 yards, 1:32; Louisiana 38–31)
- (1:55) WAKE – Tate Carney 1-yard run, Matthew Dennis kick (Drive: 13 plays, 80 yards, 6:06; Tied 38–38)
- (0:52) LA – Kenneth Almendares 31-yard field goal (Drive: 6 plays, 30 yards, 0:55; Louisiana 41–38)

Statistics	LA	WAKE
First downs	24	28
Plays–yards	62–466	73–472
Rushes–yards	33–209	37–218
Passing yards	257	254
Passing: Comp–Att–Int	20–29–0	29–36–1
Time of possession	29:01	30:59

Team	Category	Player	Statistics
Louisiana	Passing	Ben Wooldridge	20/29, 257 yards, 3 TD
Louisiana	Rushing	Bill Davis	13 carries, 95 yards, TD
Louisiana	Receiving	Lance LeGendre	6 receptions, 123 yards, 2 TD
Wake Forest	Passing	Hank Bachmeier	29/35, 254 yards, TD, INT
Wake Forest	Rushing	Demond Claiborne	12 carries, 94 yards, TD
Wake Forest	Receiving	Horatio Fields	6 receptions, 81 yards

=== at Southern Miss ===
Game Five – Louisiana Ragin' Cajuns (3–1) at Southern Miss Golden Eagles (1–3) – Game summary

Quarter	1	2	3	4	Total
Ragin' Cajuns	3	14	3	3	23
Golden Eagles	0	13	0	0	13

at M. M. Roberts Stadium, Hattiesburg, Mississippi

- Date: Saturday October 5, 2024
- Game time: 6:00 p.m. CDT
- Game weather: Cloudy • Temperature: 82 °F (28 °C) • Wind: NE at 5 miles per hour (8.0 km/h)
- Game attendance: 24,041
- Referee: Ted Pitts
- TV announcers (ESPN+): Jason Baker (play-by-play) and Austin Davis (analyst)

Game information

First Quarter

- (9:47) LA – Kenneth Almendares 21-yard field goal (Drive: 10 plays, 75 yards, 5:08; Louisiana 3–0)

Second Quarter

- (13:26) LA – Lance LeGendre 15-yard pass from Ben Wooldridge, Kenneth Almendares kick (Drive: 10 plays, 66 yards, 4:12; Louisiana 10–0)
- (11:19) USM – Kenyon Clay 1-yard run, Connor Gibbs kick (Drive: 6 plays, 80 yards, 1:59; Louisiana 10–7)
- (8:51) LA – Dre'lyn Washington 21-yard run, Kenneth Almendares kick (Drive: 5 plays, 67 yards, 2:19; Louisiana 17–7)
- (1:40) USM – Kenyon Clay 5-yard run (Drive: 8 plays, 82 yards, 2:23; Louisiana 17–13)

Third Quarter

- (2:07) LA – Kenneth Almendares 30-yard field goal (Drive: 15 plays, 76 yards, 8:14; Louisiana 20–13)

Fourth Quarter

- (5:29) LA – Kenneth Almendares 19-yard field goal (Drive: 11 plays, 52 yards, 7:05; Louisiana 23–13)

Statistics	LA	USM
First downs	22	8
Total yards	410	177
Rushing yards	188	37
Passing yards	222	140
Passing: Comp–Att–Int	22–30–0	15–21–0
Time of possession	41:35	18:25

Team	Category	Player	Statistics
Louisiana	Passing	Ben Wooldridge	22/30, 222 yards, TD
Louisiana	Rushing	Dre'lyn Washington	12 carries, 91 yards, TD
Louisiana	Receiving	Terrance Carter	7 receptions, 64 yards
Southern Miss	Passing	Tate Rodemaker	15/21, 140 yards
Southern Miss	Rushing	Rodrigues Clark	7 carries, 61 yards
Southern Miss	Receiving	Kenyon Clay	1 reception, 31 yards

=== Appalachian State ===
Game Six – Appalachian State Mountaineers (2–3) at Louisiana Ragin' Cajuns (4–1) – Game summary

Quarter	1	2	3	4	Total
Mountaineers	0	14	3	7	24
Ragin' Cajuns	3	14	3	14	34

at Cajun Field • Lafayette, Louisiana

- Date: Saturday October 12, 2024
- Game time: 6:30 p.m.
- Game weather: Sunny
- Game attendance: 14,058
- Referee: Steven Robinson
- TV: ESPN+

Game information

First quarter

- (8:03) LA – Kenneth Almendares 32-yard field goal (Drive: 12 plays, 75 yards, 4:56; Louisiana 3–0)

Second quarter

- (10:29) APP – David Larkins 1-yard pass from Joey Aguilar, Jackson Moore kick (Drive: 13 plays, 77 yards, 6:48; Appalachian State 7–3)
- (10:10) LA – Terrance Carter 74-yard pass from Ben Wooldridge, Kenneth Almendares kick (Drive: 1 play, 74 yards, 0:13; Louisiana 10–7)
- (1:55) LA – Harvey Broussard 8-yard pass from Ben Wooldridge, Kenneth Almendares kick (Drive: 5 plays, 33 yards, 3:14; Louisiana 17–7)
- (0:27) APP – Kanye Roberts 15-yard pass from Joey Aguilar, Jackson Moore kick (Drive: 10 plays, 70 yards, 1:28; Louisiana 17–14)

Third quarter

- (8:19) APP – Jackson Moore 44-yard field goal (Drive: 11 plays, 44 yards, 4:46; Tied 17–17)
- (3:10) LA – Kenneth Almendares 53-yard field goal (Drive: 11 plays, 41 yards, 5:04; Louisiana 20–17)

Fourth quarter

- (13:11) LA – Landon Burton 0-yard run, Kenneth Almendares kick (Drive: 1 play, 7 yards, 0:08; Louisiana 27–17)
- (8:06) APP – Eli Wilson 26-yard pass from Joey Aguilar, Jackson Moore kick (Drive: 7 plays, 67 yards, 2:38; Louisiana 27–24)
- (1:03) LA – Ben Wooldridge 1-yard run, Kenneth Almendares kick (Drive: 7 plays, 32 yards, 2:44; Louisiana 34–24)

Statistics	APP	LA
First downs	25	19
Total yards	391	364
Rushing yards	155	166
Passing yards	236	198
Passing: Comp–Att–Int	20–42–4	14–23–1
Time of possession	30:40	29:20

Team	Category	Player	Statistics
Appalachian State	Passing	Joey Aguilar	20/42, 236 yards, 3 TD, 4 INT
Appalachian State	Rushing	Kanye Roberts	26 carries, 148 yards
Appalachian State	Receiving	Kaedin Robinson	7 receptions, 96 yards
Louisiana	Passing	Ben Wooldridge	14/23, 198 yards, 2 TD, INT
Louisiana	Rushing	Zylan Perry	14 carries, 53 yards
Louisiana	Receiving	Terrance Carter	4 receptions, 107 yards, TD

=== at Coastal Carolina ===
Game Seven – Louisiana Ragin' Cajuns (5–1) at Coastal Carolina Chanticleers (4–2) – Game summary

Quarter	1	2	3	4	Total
Ragin' Cajuns	7	10	0	17	34
Chanticleers	0	14	3	7	24

at Brooks Stadium • Conway, SC

- Date: Saturday October 19, 2024
- Game time: 11:00 a.m.
- Game weather: Sunny
- Game attendance: 17,812
- Referee: Tim Barker
- TV announcers (ESPNU): Courtney Lyle (play-by-play) and Rene Ingoglia (analyst)

Game information

First quarter

- (4:09) LA – Lance LeGendre 33-yard pass from Ben Wooldridge, Kenneth Almendares kick (Drive: 7 plays, 98 yards, 3:53; Louisiana 7–0)

Second quarter

- (12:28) LA – Bill Davis 9-yard pass from Ben Wooldridge, Kenneth Almendares kick (Drive: 9 plays, 73 yards, 4:20; Louisiana 14–0)
- (8:50) CCU – Kendall Karr 11-yard pass from Noah Kim, Kade Hensley kick (Drive: 9 plays, 76 yards, 3:33; Louisiana 14–7)
- (3:11) LA – Kenneth Alemdares 45-yard field goal (Drive: 11 plays, 47 yards, 5:39; Louisiana 17–7)
- (0:44) CCU – Braydon Bennett 4-yard pass from Noah Kim, Kade Hensley kick (Drive: 10 plays, 90 yards, 2:22; Louisiana 17–14)

Third quarter

- (5:16) CCU – Kade Hensley 29-yard field goal (Drive: 10 plays, 90 yards, 2:22; Tied 17–17)

Fourth quarter

- (12:48) LA – Ben Wooldridge 1-yard run, Kenneth Almendares kick (Drive: 12 plays, 81 yards, 7:22; Louisiana 24–17)
- (10:52) CCU – Braydon Bennett 49-yard run, Kade Hensley kick (Drive: 4 plays, 73 yards, 1:52; Tied 24–24)
- (5:58) LA – Kenneth Almendares 38-yard field goal (Drive: 9 plays, 55 yards, 4:54; Louisiana 27–24)
- (2:34) LA – Terrance Carter 59-yard pass from Ben Wooldridge, Kenneth Almendares kick (Drive: 6 plays, 76 yards, 2:30; Louisiana 34–24)

Statistics	LA	CCU
First downs	26	19
Total yards	516	400
Rushing yards	143	208
Passing yards	373	192
Passing: Comp–Att–Int	27–36–0	19–35–0
Time of possession	38:32	21:28

Team	Category	Player	Statistics
Louisiana	Passing	Ben Wooldridge	27/36, 373 yards, 3 TD
Louisiana	Rushing	Bill Davis	19 carries, 110 yards
Louisiana	Receiving	Terrance Carter	7 receptions, 149 yards, TD
Coastal Carolina	Passing	Noah Kim	16/25, 182 yards, 2 TD
Coastal Carolina	Rushing	Braydon Bennett	13 carries, 132 yards, TD
Coastal Carolina	Receiving	Bryson Graves	3 receptions, 54 yards

=== at Texas State ===
Game Eight – Louisiana Ragin' Cajuns (6–1) at Texas State Bobcats (4–3) – Game summary

Quarter	1	2	3	4	Total
Ragin' Cajuns	7	7	3	6	23
Bobcats	6	0	8	3	17

at UFCU Stadium • San Marcos, TX

- Date: Tuesday October 29, 2024
- Game time: 6:30 p.m.
- Game weather: Clear • Temperature: 83 °F (28 °C) • Wind: N 19 miles per hour (31 km/h)
- Game attendance: 16,831
- Referee: Jay Hagood
- TV announcers (ESPN2): Jay Alter (play-by-play) and Rocky Boiman (analyst)

Game information

First quarter

- (11:16) TXST – Mason Shipley 21-yard field goal (Drive: 11 plays, 71 yards, 3:44; Texas State 3–0)
- (2:50) TXST – Mason Shipley 25-yard field goal (Drive: 14 plays, 69 yards, 6:27; Texas State 6–0)
- (0:08) LA – Dre'lyn Washington 64-yard run, Kenneth Almendares kick (Drive: 6 plays, 75 yards, 2:42; Louisiana 7–6)

Second quarter

- (1:08) LA – Caden Jensen 1-yard pass from Ben Wooldridge, Kenneth Almendares kick (Drive: 11 plays, 80 yards, 4:17; Louisiana 14–6)

Third quarter

- (8:23) TXST – Ismail Mahdi 1-yard run, Jaden Williams pass (Drive: 10 plays, 45 yards, 4:33; Tied 14–14)
- (4:59) LA – Kenneth Almendares 42-yard field goal (Drive: 7 plays, 50 yards, 3:24; Louisiana 17–14)

Fourth quarter

- (14:08) LA – Kenneth Almendares 24-yard field goal (Drive: 10 plays, 49 yards, 4:30; Louisiana 20–14)
- (10:02) TXST – Mason Shipley 25-yard field goal (Drive: 9 plays, 67 yards, 4:06; Louisiana 20–17)
- (7:07) LA – Kenneth Almendares 44-yard field goal (Drive: 6 plays, 48 yards, 2:55; Louisiana 23–17)

Statistics	LA	TXST
First downs	20	26
Total yards	423	378
Rushing yards	171	177
Passing yards	252	201
Passing: Comp–Att–Int	18–28–0	23–32–1
Time of possession	30:52	29:08

Team	Category	Player	Statistics
Louisiana	Passing	Ben Wooldridge	18/28, 252 yards, TD
Louisiana	Rushing	Dre'lyn Washington	10 carries, 94 yards, TD
Louisiana	Receiving	Lance LeGendre	3 receptions, 76 yards
Texas State	Passing	RJ Martinez	11/14, 113 yards, INT
Texas State	Rushing	Ismail Mahdi	14 carries, 82 yards, TD
Texas State	Receiving	Kole Wilson	6 receptions, 57 yards

=== Arkansas State ===
Game Nine – Arkansas State Red Wolves (5–3) at Louisiana Ragin' Cajuns (7–1) – Game summary

Quarter	1	2	3	4	Total
Red Wolves	0	6	6	7	19
Ragin' Cajuns	10	21	17	7	55

at Cajun Field, Lafayette, LA

- Date: Saturday November 9, 2024
- Game time: 4:00 p.m. CDT
- Game weather: Sunny • Temperature: 80 °F (27 °C) • Wind: W 5 miles per hour (8.0 km/h)
- Game attendance: 16,451
- Referee: Trennis Livingston
- TV announcers (ESPN+): Dan McDonald (play-by-play) and Eric Mouton (analyst)

Game information

First Quarter

- (9:07) LA – Harvey Broussard 20-yard pass from Ben Wooldridge, Kenneth Almendares kick (Drive: 7 plays, 71 yards, 3:13; Louisiana 7–0)
- (3:04) LA – Kenneth Almendares 44-yard field goal (Drive: 6 plays, 41 yards, 2:07; Louisiana 10–0)

Second Quarter

- (12:15) LA – Dre'lyn Washington 46-yard run, Kenneth Almendares kick (Drive: 6 plays, 64 yards, 2:45; Louisiana 17–0)
- (7:23) LA – Zylan Perry 4-yard run, Kenneth Almendares kick (Drive: 5 plays, 41 yards, 2:20; Louisiana 24–0)
- (1:47) LA – Bill Davis 13-yard run, Kenneth Almendares kick (Drive: 7 plays, 94 yards, 3:30; Louisiana 31–0)
- (0:07) ARST – Adam Jones 16-yard pass from Jaylen Raynor (Drive: 11 plays, 83 yards, 1:36; Louisiana 31–6)

Third Quarter

- (10:54) LA – Kenneth Almendares 45-yard field goal (Drive: 9 plays, 47 yards, 4:06; Louisiana 34–6)
- (8:52) ARST – Zak Wallace 13-yard run (Drive: 7 plays, 75 yards, 2:02; Louisiana 34–12)
- (5:57) LA – Bill Davis 10-yard run, Kenneth Almendares kick (Drive: 6 plays, 70 yards, 2:46; Louisiana 41–12)
- (0:34) LA – Dre'lyn Washington 14-yard run, Kenneth Almendares kick (Drive: 5 plays, 80 yards, 2:19; Louisiana 48–12)

Fourth Quarter

- (8:46) LA – Chandler Fields 12-yard run, Kenneth Almendares kick (Drive: 9 plays, 80 yards, 4:42; Louisiana 55–12)
- (3:48) ARST – Timmy McClain 10-yard run, Clune Van Andel kick (Drive: 8 plays, 79 yards, 4:52; Louisiana 55–19)

Statistics	ARST	LA
First downs	27	27
Total yards	401	579
Rushing yards	209	278
Passing yards	192	301
Passing: Comp–Att–Int	25–37–2	22–33–0
Time of possession	29:23	30:37

Team	Category	Player	Statistics
Arkansas State	Passing	Jaylen Raynor	23/35, 167 yards, TD, 2 INT
Arkansas State	Rushing	Ja'Quez Cross	14 carries, 81 yards
Arkansas State	Receiving	Corey Rucker	6 receptions, 73 yards
Louisiana	Passing	Ben Wooldridge	17/26, 264 yards, TD
Louisiana	Rushing	Dre'lyn Washington	8 carries, 123 yards, 2 TD
Louisiana	Receiving	Lance LeGendre	4 receptions, 58 yards

=== South Alabama ===
Game Ten – South Alabama Jaguars (4–5) at Louisiana Ragin' Cajuns (8–1)

Quarter	1	2	3	4	Total
Jaguars	7	17	0	0	24
Ragin' Cajuns	0	3	3	16	22

at Cajun Field, Lafayette, LA

- Date: Saturday November 16, 2024
- Game time: 6:00 p.m. CDT
- Game weather: Cloudy • Temperature: 69 °F (21 °C) • Wind: W 5 mph
- Game attendance: 16,063
- Referee: Steven Robinson
- TV announcers (ESPN+): Dan McDonald (play-by-play), Eric Mouton (analyst) and Ben Schafer (sideline)

Game information

First Quarter

- (5:10) USA – Gio Lopez 2-yard run, Laith Marjan kick (Drive: 9 plays, 74 yards, 4:05; South Alabama 7–0)

Second Quarter

- (14:54) USA – Gio Lopez 9-yard run, Laith Marjan kick (Drive: 5 plays, 90 yards, 1:52; South Alabama 14–0)
- (10:24) LA – Kenneth Almendares 35-yard field goal (Drive: 7 plays, 44 yards, 4:22; South Alabama 14–3)
- (6:18) USA – Kentrel Bullock 2-yard run, Laith Marjan kick (Drive: 10 plays, 75 yards, 4:06; South Alabama 21–3)
- (0:00) USA – Laith Marjan 35-yard field goal (Drive: 9 plays, 36 yards, 1:21; South Alabama 24–3)

Third Quarter

- (5:11) LA – Kenneth Almendares 25-yard field goal (Drive: 15 plays, 60 yards, 8:28; South Alabama 24–6)

Fourth Quarter

- (14:18) LA – Kenneth Almendares 22-yard field goal (Drive: 8 plays, 16 yards, 3:42; South Alabama 24–9)
- (8:28) LA – Dre'lyn Washington 66-yard pass from Chandler Fields, Kenneth Almendares kick (Drive: 3 plays, 82 yards, 1:02; South Alabama 24–16)
- (1:16) LA – Chandler Fields 2-yard run (Drive: 12 plays, 86 yards, 4:14; South Alabama 24–22)

Statistics	USA	LA
First downs	19	22
Total yards	353	413
Rushing yards	68	137
Passing yards	285	276
Passing: Comp–Att–Int	24–34–1	22–30–1
Time of possession	27:10	32:50

Team	Category	Player	Statistics
South Alabama	Passing	Gio Lopez	24/34, 285 yards, INT
South Alabama	Rushing	Fluff Bothwell	9 carries, 38 yards
South Alabama	Receiving	Jamaal Pritchett	11 receptions, 170 yards
Louisiana	Passing	Chandler Fields	14/17, 185 yards, TD
Louisiana	Rushing	Bill Davis	16 carries, 50 yards
Louisiana	Receiving	Harvey Broussard	6 receptions, 84 yards

=== Troy ===
Game Eleven – Troy Trojans (3–7) at Louisiana Ragin' Cajuns (8–2)

Quarter	1	2	3	4	Total
Trojans	14	0	8	8	30
Ragin' Cajuns	7	27	3	14	51

at Cajun Field, Lafayette, LA

- Date: Saturday November 23, 2024
- Game time: 4:00 p.m. CDT
- Game weather: Sunny • Temperature: 68 °F (20 °C) • Wind: NE 1 mph
- Game attendance: 15,501
- Referee: Jeremy Parker
- TV announcers (ESPN+): Dan McDonald (play-by-play), Eric Mouton (analyst) and Ben Schafer (sideline)

Game information

First Quarter

- (9:44) LA – Tavion Smith 20-yard pass from Chandler Fields, Kenneth Almendares kick (Drive: 6 plays, 85 yards, 3:03; Louisiana 7–0)
- (4:24) TROY – Jackson Worley 4-yard pass from Matthew Caldwell, Scott Taylor Renfroe kick (Drive: 7 plays, 34 yards, 3:45; Tied 7–7)
- (0:00) TROY – Devonte Ross 30-yard pass from Matthew Caldwell, Scott Taylor Renfroe kick (Drive: 7 plays, 68 yards, 2:58; Troy 14–7)

Second Quarter

- (13:31) LA – Bill Davis 1-yard run, Kenneth Almendares kick (Drive: 4 plays, 55 yards, 1:20; Tied 14–14)
- (12:23) LA – Lance LeGendre 44-yard pass from Chandler Fields, Kenneth Almendares kick (Drive: 1 play, 44 yards, 0:08; Louisiana 21–14)
- (8:08) LA – Kenneth Almendares 38-yard field goal (Drive: 6 plays, 37 yards, 2:44; Louisiana 24–14)
- (2:16) LA – Bill Davis 3-yard run, Kenneth Almendares kick (Drive: 5 plays, 49 yards, 2:49; Louisiana 31–14)
- (0:00) LA – Kenneth Almendares 32-yard field goal (Drive: 6 plays, 26 yards, 0:48; Louisiana 34–14)

Third Quarter

- (11:06) LA – Kenneth Almendares 46-yard field goal (Drive: 7 plays, 46 yards, 3:54; Louisiana 37–14)
- (5:45) TROY – Brody Dalton 6-yard pass from Matthew Caldwell, Landon Parker pass (Drive: 10 plays, 83 yards, 5:14; Louisiana 37–22)

Fourth Quarter

- (11:31) TROY – Trae Swartz 1-yard pass from Matthew Caldwell, Devonte Ross pass (Drive: 13 plays, 82 yards, 6:48; Louisiana 37–30)
- (11:16) LA – Robert Williams 96-yard kickoff return, Kenneth Almendares kick (Louisiana 44–30)
- (1:09) LA – Bill Davis 1-yard run, Kenneth Almendares kick (Drive: 3 plays, 3 yards, 1:31; Louisiana 51–30)

Statistics	TROY	LA
First downs	22	17
Total yards	394	417
Rushing yards	135	94
Passing yards	259	323
Passing: Comp–Att–Int	27–44–0	18–24–2
Time of possession	33:37	26:23

Team	Category	Player	Statistics
Troy	Passing	Matthew Caldwell	26/42, 230 yards, 4 TD, 2 INT
Troy	Rushing	Damien Taylor	16 carries, 67 yards
Troy	Receiving	Devonte Ross	8 receptions, 95 yards, TD
Louisiana	Passing	Chandler Fields	18/24, 323 yards, 2 TD
Louisiana	Rushing	Bill Davis	19 carries, 64 yards, 3 TD
Louisiana	Receiving	Lance LeGendre	6 receptions, 109 yards, TD

=== at Louisiana–Monroe (Battle on the Bayou) ===
Game Twelve – Louisiana Ragin' Cajuns (9–2) at Louisiana–Monroe Warhawks (5–6) – Game summary

Quarter	1	2	3	4	Total
Ragin' Cajuns	6	7	7	17	37
Warhawks	3	10	3	7	23

at Malone Stadium • Monroe, LA

- Date: Saturday November 30, 2024
- Game time: 11:00 a.m.
- Game weather: Sunny • Temperature: 49 °F (9 °C) • Wind: SE 8 mph
- Referee: Scott Broadway
- TV announcers (ESPNU): Courtney Lyle (play-by-play) and Rene Ingoglia (analyst)

Game information

First quarter

- (7:26) ULM – Max Larson 25-yard field goal (Drive: 8 plays, 35 yards, 3:42; Louisiana–Monroe 3–0)
- (2:14) LA – Zylan Perry 1-yard run, Kenneth Almendares PAT blocked (Drive: 6 plays, 27 yards, 1:44; Louisiana 6–3)

Second quarter

- (10:23) ULM – Tyler Griffin 7-yard pass from Aidan Armenta, Max Larson kick (Drive: 11 plays, 88 yards, 5:36; Louisiana–Monroe 10–6)
- (4:03) LA – Lance LeGendre 6-yard pass from Chandler Fields, Kenneth Almendares kick (Drive: 11 plays, 88 yards, 5:36; Louisiana 13–10)
- (0:19) ULM – Max Larson 47-yard field goal (Drive: 11 plays, 48 yards, 3:41; TIE 13–13)

Third quarter

- (11:09) LA – Tavion Smith 4-yard pass from Chandler Fields, Kenneth Almendares kick (Drive: 7 plays, 80 yards, 3:46; Louisiana 20–13)
- (2:32) ULM – Max Larson 29-yard field goal (Drive: 15 plays, 64 yards, 8:37; Louisiana 20–16)

Fourth quarter

- (11:30) LA – Zylan Perry 7-yard run, Kenneth Almendares kick (Drive: 13 plays, 65 yards, 5:54; Louisiana 27–16)
- (6:07) LA – Kenneth Almendares 26-yard field goal (Drive: 8 plays, 41 yards, 3:55; Louisiana 30–16)
- (3:52) ULM – Ahmad Hardy 8-yard run, Max Larson kick (Drive: 7 plays, 75 yards, 2:15; Louisiana 30–23)
- (1:05) LA – Bill Davis 24-yard run, Kenneth Almendares kick (Drive: 8 plays, 75 yards, 2:47; Louisiana 37–23)

Statistics	LA	ULM
First downs	21	20
Total yards	411	335
Rushing yards	223	167
Passing yards	188	168
Passing: Comp–Att–Int	17-26-1	15-31-3
Time of possession	31:00	29:00

Team	Category	Player	Statistics
Louisiana	Passing	Chandler Fields	17/26, 188 yards, 2 TDs, 1 INT
Louisiana	Rushing	Zylan Perry	19 carries, 150 yards, 2 TDs
Louisiana	Receiving	Jacob Bernard	3 receptions, 42 yards
Louisiana–Monroe	Passing	Aidan Armenta	15/31, 168 yards, 1 TD, 3 INTs
Louisiana–Monroe	Rushing	Ahmad Hardy	28 carries, 172 yards, 1 TD
Louisiana–Monroe	Receiving	Nate Sullivan Jr.	2 receptions, 39 yards

=== Marshall (Sun Belt Championship) ===
Sun Belt Conference Football Championship Game
Marshall Thundering Herd (9–3) at Louisiana Ragin' Cajuns (10–2) – Game summary

Quarter	1	2	3	4	Total
Thundering Herd	7	10	7	7	31
Ragin' Cajuns	3	0	0	0	3

at Cajun Field • Lafayette, Louisiana

- Date: Saturday, December 7, 2024
- Game time: 7:30 p.m.
- Game weather: Cloudy • Temperature: 45 °F (7 °C) • Wind: W 2 mph
- Game attendance: 20,067
- Referee: Trennis Livingston
- TV announcers (ESPN): Roy Philpott (play-by-play), Sam Acho (analyst), and Lauren Sisler (sideline reporter)

Game information

First quarter

- (6:42) LA – Kenneth Almendares 40-yard field goal (Drive: 5 plays, 52 yards, 2:05; Louisiana 3–0)
- (4:04) MRSH – Tychaun Chapman 37-yard pass from Braylon Braxton, Rece Verhoff kick (Drive: 7 plays, 75 yards, 2:38; Marshall 7–3)

Second quarter

- (7:54) MRSH – Rece Verhoff 32-yard field goal (Drive: 9 plays, 54 yards, 4:14; Marshall 10–3)
- (2:47) MRSH – Ethan Payne 15-yard rush, Rece Verhoff kick (Drive: 7 plays, 56 yards, 3:04; Marshall 17–3)

Third quarter

- (7:43) MRSH – Bralon Brown 20-yard pass from Braylon Braxton, Rece Verhoff kick (Drive: 9 plays, 56 yards, 4:24; Marshall 24–3)

Fourth quarter

- (2:03) MRSH – Jordan Houston 9-yard rush, Rece Verhoff kick (Drive: 8 plays, 86 yards, 5:45; Marshall 31–3)

Statistics	MRSH	LA
First downs	25	11
Plays–yards	410	255
Rushes–yards	217	56
Passing yards	193	199
Passing: Comp–Att–Int	18-26-0	13-32-1
Time of possession	33:56	26:04

Team	Category	Player	Statistics
Marshall	Passing	Braylon Braxton	18/26, 193 yards, 2 TDs
Marshall	Rushing	Jordan Houston	17 carries, 117 yards, 1 TD
Marshall	Receiving	Tychaun Chapman	8 receptions, 86 yards, 1 TD
Louisiana	Passing	Chandler Fields	4/8, 104 yards
Louisiana	Rushing	Zylan Perry	6 carries, 25 yards
Louisiana	Receiving	Lance LeGendre	4 receptions, 81 yards

=== TCU (New Mexico Bowl) ===
2024 New Mexico Bowl
Louisiana Ragin' Cajuns (10–3) vs TCU Horned Frogs (8–4) – Game summary

Quarter	1	2	3	4	Total
Ragin' Cajuns	0	0	0	3	3
Horned Frogs	14	13	7	0	34

at University Stadium • Albuquerque, New Mexico

- Date: Saturday, December 28, 2024
- Game time: 1:15 p.m. CST
- Game weather: Sunny • Temperature: 50 °F (10 °C) • Wind: 1 mph (1.6 km/h) northeast
- Game attendance: 22,827
- Referee: Charles Lamertina
- TV announcers (ESPN): Mark Jones (play-by-play), Roddy Jones (analyst), and Lauren Sisler (sideline)

Game information

First Quarter

- (10:11) TCU – DJ Rogers 3 yard pass from Josh Hoover, Kyle Lemmermann kick (Drive: 11 plays, 75 yards, 4:49; TCU 7–0)
- (2:23) TCU – Eric McAlister 1 yard pass from Josh Hoover, Kyle Lemmermann kick (Drive: 10 plays, 63 yards, 5:04; TCU 14–0)

Second Quarter

- (11:06) TCU – Kyle Lemmermann 45 yard field goal (Drive: 10 plays, 30 yards, 4:42; TCU 17–0)
- (5:34) TCU – Kyle Lemmermann 22 yard field goal (Drive: 9 plays, 60 yards, 2:51; TCU 20–0)
- (0:57) TCU – JP Richardson 20 yard pass from Josh Hoover, Kyle Lemmermann kick (Drive: 4 plays, 28 yards, 1:27; TCU 27–0)

Third Quarter

- (9:26) TCU – Blake Nowell 20 yard pass from Josh Hoover, Kyle Lemmermann kick (Drive: 4 plays, 54 yards, 1:36; TCU 34–0)

Fourth Quarter

- (12:05) LA – Kenneth Almendares 24 yard field goal (Drive: 9 plays, 24 yards, 3:46; TCU 34–3)

Statistics	LA	TCU
First downs	13	19
Total yards	209	367
Rushing yards	114	110
Passing yards	95	257
Passing: Comp–Att–Int	11–26–2	21–34–1
Time of possession	29:17	30:43

Team	Category	Player	Statistics
Louisiana	Passing	Ben Wooldridge	7/20, 61 yards, INT
Louisiana	Rushing	Zylan Perry	11 carries, 49 yards
Louisiana	Receiving	Jacob Bernard	1 reception, 25 yards
TCU	Passing	Josh Hoover	20/32, 252 yards, 4 TD, INT
TCU	Rushing	Trent Battle	9 carries, 42 yards
TCU	Receiving	Eric McAlister	8 receptions, 87 yards, TD
