= 2024 New Mexico Bowl =

Postseason college football bowl game

2024 Isleta New Mexico Bowl
- 19th New Mexico Bowl
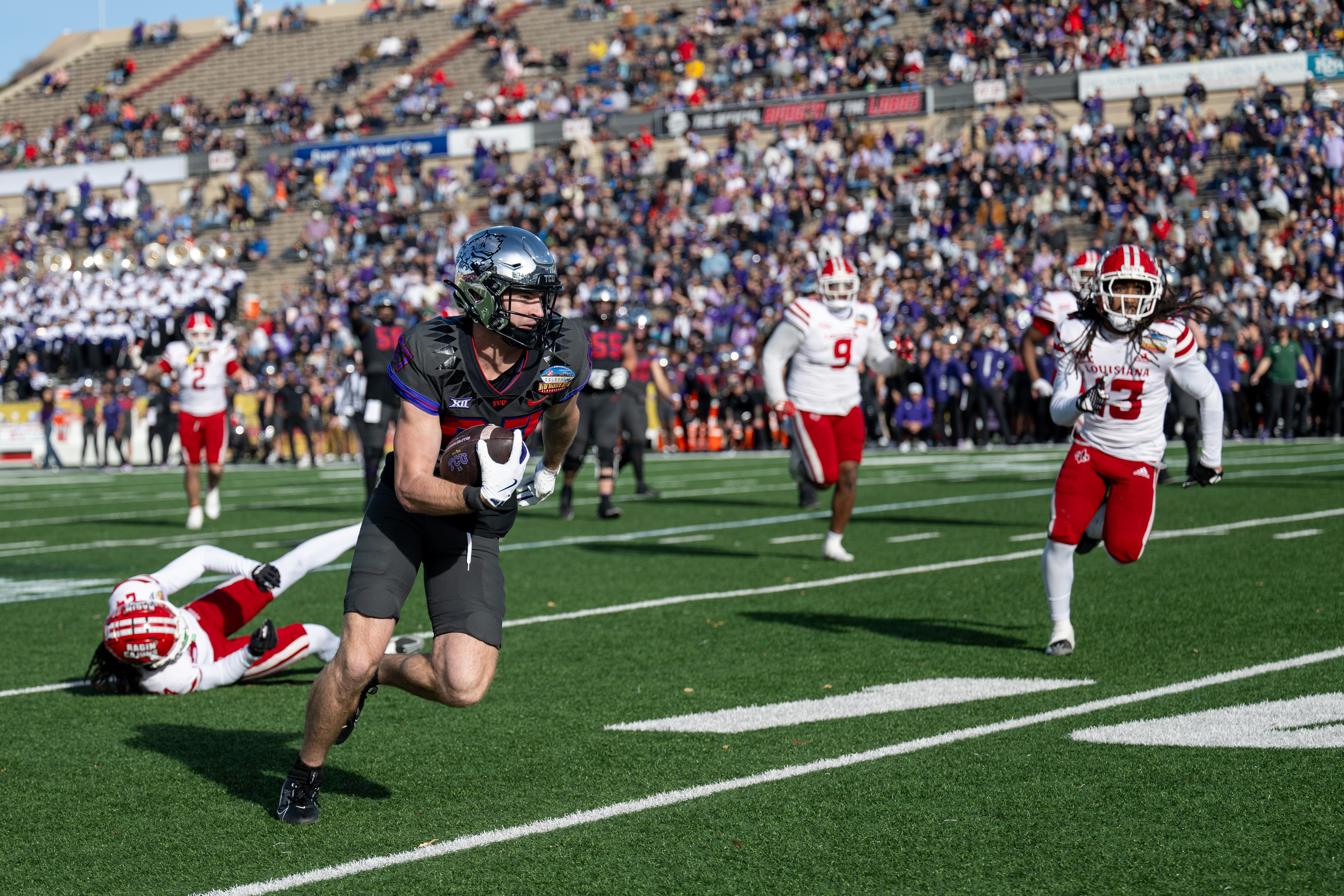
- TCU wide receiver Blake Nowell carries the ball during the 2024 New Mexico Bowl
Louisiana Ragin' Cajuns	TCU Horned Frogs
(10–3)	(8–4)
Sun Belt	Big 12
3	34
Head coach: Michael Desormeaux	Head coach: Sonny Dykes
	1	2	3	4	Total
Louisiana	0	0	0	3	3
TCU	14	13	7	0	34
- Date: December 28, 2024
- Season: 2024
- Stadium: University Stadium
- Location: Albuquerque, New Mexico
- MVP: Offensive: Josh Hoover (QB, TCU); Defensive: Devean Deal (OLB, TCU)
- Favorite: TCU by 9.5
- Referee: Charles Lamertina (AAC)
- Attendance: 22,827

United States TV coverage
- Network: ESPN
- Announcers: Brian Custer (play-by-play), Rod Gilmore (analyst), and Lauren Sisler (sideline)

The 2024 New Mexico Bowl was a college football bowl game played on December 28, 2024, at University Stadium located in Albuquerque, New Mexico. The 19th annual New Mexico Bowl featured Louisiana and TCU. The game began at approximately 12:15 p.m. MST and aired on ESPN. The New Mexico Bowl was one of the 2024–25 bowl games concluding the 2024 FBS football season. The game was sponsored by Isleta Pueblo and was officially known as the Isleta New Mexico Bowl.

== Teams ==
Based on conference tie-ins, the game was expected to feature teams from the Conference USA and the Mountain West Conference. However, due to other bowl selections and a limited number of bowl-eligible teams from those conferences, TCU of the Big 12 Conference and Louisiana of the Sun Belt Conference were invited. This was the first New Mexico Bowl to feature a team from either of those conferences. This was the first meeting between Louisiana and TCU.

=== Louisiana Ragin' Cajuns ===
Louisiana played to a 10–3 regular-season record (7–1 in conference). The Ragin' Cajuns did not face any ranked teams during the season.

=== TCU Horned Frogs ===
TCU ended their regular season with an 8–4 record (6–3 in conference). The Horned Frogs also did not play any ranked teams.

== Game summary ==
2024 New Mexico Bowl

Quarter	1	2	3	4	Total
Louisiana	0	0	0	3	3
TCU	14	13	7	0	34

at University Stadium • Albuquerque, New Mexico

- Date: Saturday, December 28, 2024
- Game time: 12:25 p.m. MST
- Game weather: Sunny • Temperature: 50 °F (10 °C) • Wind: 1 mph (1.6 km/h) northeast
- Game attendance: 22,827
- Referee: Charles Lamertina
- TV announcers (ESPN): Brian Custer (play-by-play), Rod Gilmore (analyst), and Lauren Sisler (sideline)
- Box score

Game information

First Quarter

- (10:11) TCU – DJ Rogers 3 yard pass from Josh Hoover, Kyle Lemmermann kick (Drive: 11 plays, 75 yards, 4:49; TCU 7–0)
- (2:23) TCU – Eric McAlister 1 yard pass from Josh Hoover, Kyle Lemmermann kick (Drive: 10 plays, 63 yards, 5:04; TCU 14–0)

Second Quarter

- (11:06) TCU – Kyle Lemmermann 45 yard field goal (Drive: 10 plays, 30 yards, 4:42; TCU 17–0)
- (5:34) TCU – Kyle Lemmermann 22 yard field goal (Drive: 9 plays, 60 yards, 2:51; TCU 20–0)
- (0:57) TCU – JP Richardson 20 yard pass from Josh Hoover, Kyle Lemmermann kick (Drive: 4 plays, 28 yards, 1:27; TCU 27–0)

Third Quarter

- (9:26) TCU – Blake Nowell 20 yard pass from Josh Hoover, Kyle Lemmermann kick (Drive: 4 plays, 54 yards, 1:36; TCU 34–0)

Fourth Quarter

- (12:05) UL – Kenneth Almendares 24 yard field goal (Drive: 9 plays, 24 yards, 3:46; TCU 34–3)

=== Statistics ===
Statistics	LA	TCU
First downs	13	19
Plays–yards	59–209	67–367
Rushes–yards	33–114	33–110
Passing yards	95	257
Passing: comp–att–int	11–26–2	21–34–1
Time of possession	29:17	30:43

Team	Category	Player	Statistics
Louisiana	Passing	Ben Wooldridge	7/20, 61 yards, INT
Louisiana	Rushing	Zylan Perry	11 carries, 49 yards
Louisiana	Receiving	Jacob Bernard	1 reception, 25 yards
TCU	Passing	Josh Hoover	20/32, 252 yards, 4 TD, INT
TCU	Rushing	Trent Battle	9 carries, 42 yards
TCU	Receiving	Eric McAlister	8 receptions, 87 yards, TD
