= Eric McAlister =

American football player

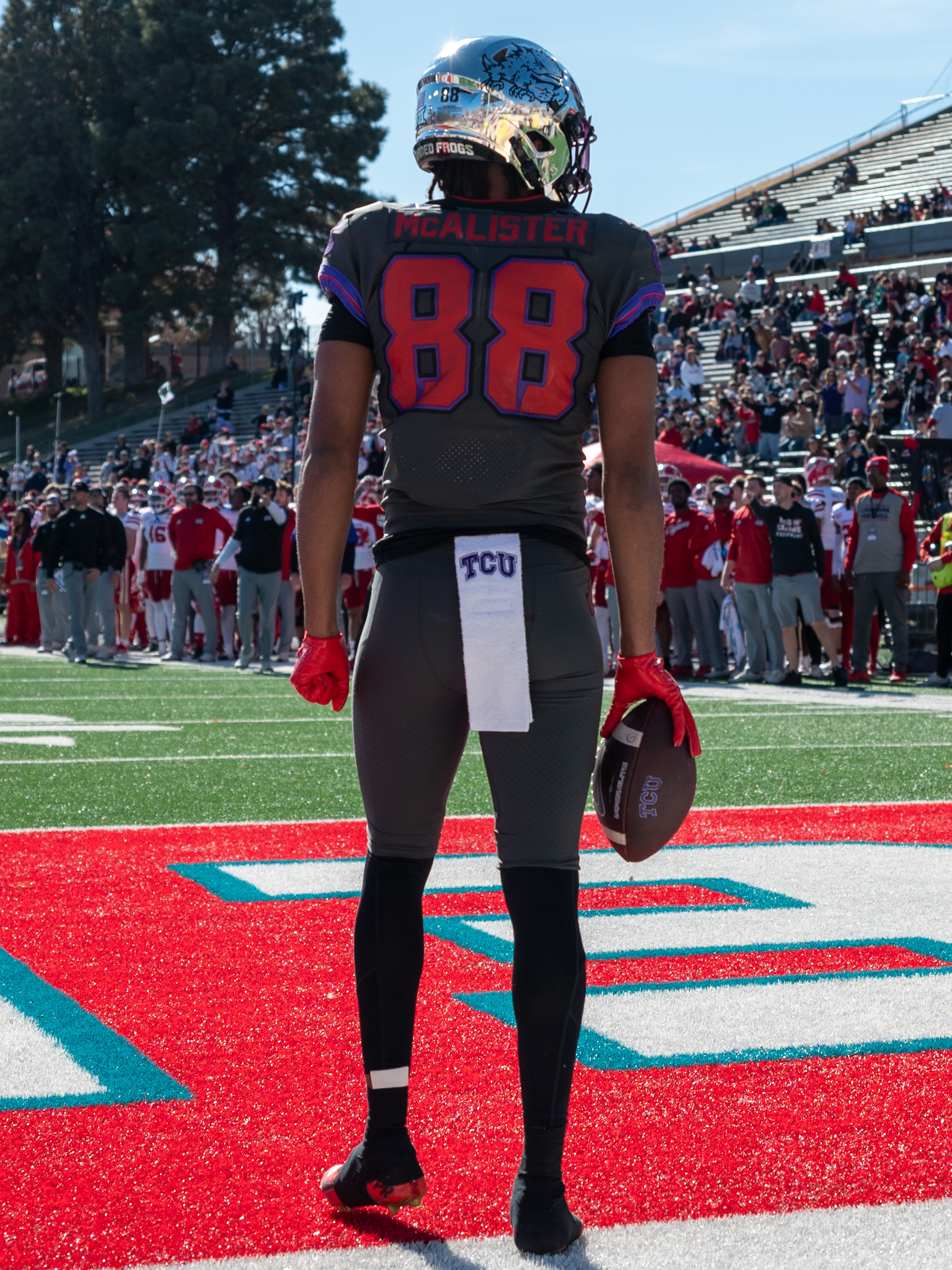
- McAlister at the 2024 New Mexico Bowl

No. 1
- Position: Wide receiver

Personal information
- Born: November 22, 2002 (age 23)
- Listed height: 6 ft 4 in (1.93 m)
- Listed weight: 194 lb (88 kg)

Career information
- High school: Azle (Azle, Texas)
- College: Boise State (2021–2023); TCU (2024–2025)
- NFL draft: 2026: undrafted

Awards and highlights
- First-team All-Big 12 (2025)
- Stats at ESPN

Eric McAlister (born November 22, 2002) is an American football wide receiver. He played college football for the Boise State Broncos and for the TCU Horned Frogs.

== Early life ==
McAlister attended Azle High School in Azle, Texas, where he caught for 2,947 yards and 43 touchdowns in his final two seasons. He was rated as a three-star recruit and committed to play college football for the Boise State Broncos over offers from schools such as Nebraska, San Diego State, Utah, Virginia Tech, Wisconsin, and Wyoming.

== College career ==
=== Boise State ===
In week 10 of the 2022 season, McAlister hauled in two receptions for 33 yards and his first career touchdown versus BYU. He finished the 2022 season with 11 receptions for 259 yards and four touchdowns. In week 10 of the 2023 season, McAlister notched eight receptions for 85 yards in a 37–30 loss to Fresno State. He finished the 2023 season with 47 receptions for 873 yards and five touchdowns for the Broncos. Late in the 2023 season with three games remaining, he stepped away from the team and entered his name into the NCAA transfer portal.

=== TCU ===
McAlister transferred to play for the TCU Horned Frogs. In his first season with the Horned Frogs in 2024, he appeared in all 13 games, where he notched 39 receptions for 762 yards and five touchdowns.

== Professional career ==
Pre-draft measurables
Height	Weight	Arm length	Hand span	Wingspan	40-yard dash	10-yard split	20-yard split	Vertical jump	Broad jump
6 ft 3 5/8 in (1.92 m)	194 lb (88 kg)	32 5/8 in (0.83 m)	9 3/4 in (0.25 m)	6 ft 5 5/8 in (1.97 m)	4.53 s	1.57 s	2.65 s	28.5 in (0.72 m)	9 ft 11 in (3.02 m)
All values from NFL Combine/Pro Day

He had a workout with the New York Giants in July 2026.

== Personal life ==
On March 15, 2024, McAlister was arrested after threatening a man with a gun; he was charged with aggravated assault with a deadly weapon and later plead guilty to a misdemeanor charge where he was sentenced to deferred adjudication probation.
