= Devean Deal =

American football player (born 2002)

Profile
- Position: Outside linebacker

Personal information
- Born: September 4, 2002 (age 24)
- Listed height: 6 ft 2 in (1.88 m)
- Listed weight: 251 lb (114 kg)

Career information
- High school: Naaman Forest (Garland, Texas)
- College: Tulane (2021–2023); TCU (2024–2025)
- NFL draft: 2026: undrafted

Career history
- Seattle Seahawks (2026)*; Los Angeles Rams (2026)*
- * Offseason or practice squad member only

Awards and highlights
- Second-team All-Big 12 (2025)

Devean Deal (born September 4, 2002) is an American professional football outside linebacker. He played college football for the TCU Horned Frogs and Tulane Green Wave.

== Early life ==
Deal attended Pebble Hills High School for his freshman and sophomore seasons before transferring to Naaman Forest High School in Garland, Texas. Coming out of high school, he committed to play college football for the Tulane Green Wave.

== College career ==
=== Tulane ===
During his three-year career at Tulane from 2021 to 2023, Deal played in 28 games, totaling 70 tackles with 15.5 going for a loss, five sacks, four pass deflections, a fumble recovery, and an interception. After the conclusion of the 2023 season, he entered the NCAA transfer portal.

=== TCU ===
Deal transferred to play for the TCU Horned Frogs. He finished the 2024 season with 46 tackles and five and a half sacks. In week 8 of the 2025 season, Deal notched two tackles, four pressures, half a sack, and a forced fumble in a victory over Baylor. He finished the 2025 season with 53 tackles with eight and a half going for a loss and three and a half sacks.

== Professional career ==
Pre-draft measurables
Height	Weight	Arm length	Hand span	Wingspan	Vertical jump	Broad jump
6 ft 2 1/8 in (1.88 m)	251 lb (114 kg)	32 7/8 in (0.84 m)	9 1/4 in (0.23 m)	6 ft 7 5/8 in (2.02 m)	33.5 in (0.85 m)	9 ft 6 in (2.90 m)
All values from Pro Day

=== Seattle Seahawks ===
After not being selected in the 2026 NFL draft, Deal signed with the Seattle Seahawks as an undrafted free agent. Deal was waived by the Seahawks on May 14, 2026.

=== Los Angeles Rams ===
On August 24, 2026, Deal was signed by the Los Angeles Rams. He was released by Los Angeles on August 29 as a part of primary roster cuts.
