= JP Richardson =

American football player (born 2002)

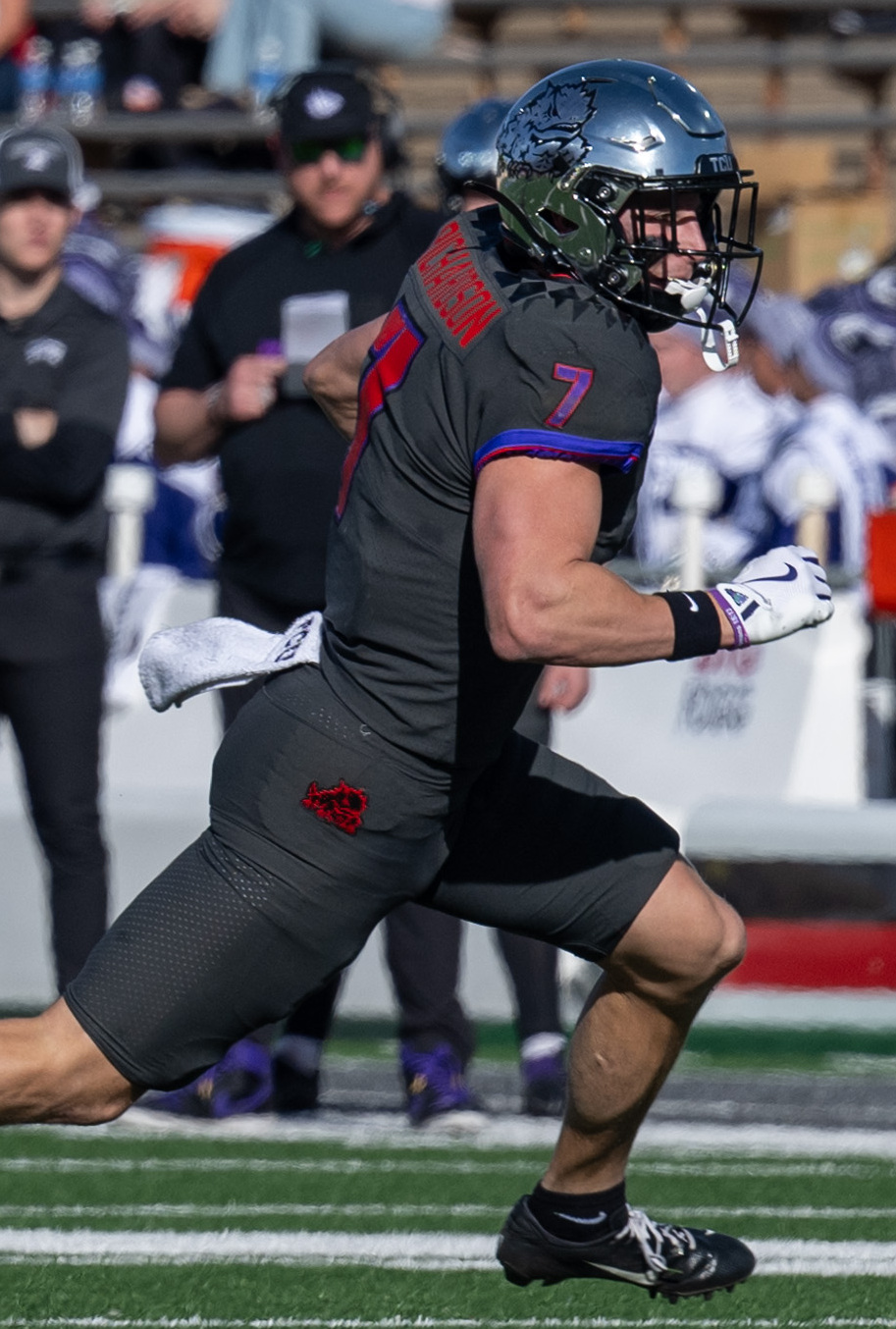
- Richardson with TCU in 2024

No. 83 – Chicago Bears
- Position: Wide receiver
- Roster status: Practice squad

Personal information
- Born: March 23, 2002 (age 24); Houston, Texas, U.S.
- Listed height: 5 ft 11 in (1.80 m)
- Listed weight: 192 lb (87 kg)

Career information
- High school: Ridge Point (Sienna, Texas)
- College: Oklahoma State (2021–2022); TCU (2023–2024)
- NFL draft: 2025: undrafted

Career history
- Chicago Bears (2025–present)

Career NFL statistics as of 2025
- Games played: 1
- Stats at Pro Football Reference

John Paul Richardson (born March 23, 2002) is an American professional football wide receiver for the Chicago Bears of the National Football League (NFL). He played college football for the Oklahoma State Cowboys and TCU Horned Frogs.

== Early life ==
Richardson was born on March 23, 2002, in Houston, Texas, and grew up in nearby Missouri City.

== College career ==
Richardson played college football for the Oklahoma State Cowboys from 2021 to 2022 and the TCU Horned Frogs from 2023 to 2024. He played in 48 games recording 175 receptions for 1,940 yards and 11 touchdowns. Richardson also featured as the Horned Frogs punt returner in 2024, returning 23 punts for 252 yards and one touchdown against Kansas.

=== College statistics ===
Legend
**Bold**	Career high

Year	Team	Games		Receiving				Rushing			
Year	Team	GP	GS	Rec	Yds	Avg	TD	Att	Yds	Avg	TD
2021	Oklahoma State	10	3	23	168	7.3	2	1	-1	-1.0	0
2022	Oklahoma State	**13**	5	49	503	10.3	**4**	1	-10	-10.0	0
2023	TCU	12	11	46	536	11.7	3	**3**	**12**	**4.0**	0
2024	TCU	**13**	**12**	**57**	**733**	**12.9**	2	1	3	3.0	0
Career		48	31	175	1,940	11.1	11	6	4	0.7	0

== Professional career ==
Pre-draft measurables
Height	Weight	Arm length	Hand span	Wingspan	40-yard dash	10-yard split	20-yard split	20-yard shuttle	Three-cone drill	Vertical jump	Broad jump	Bench press
5 ft 11 1/2 in (1.82 m)	192 lb (87 kg)	30 in (0.76 m)	9 in (0.23 m)	6 ft 0 7/8 in (1.85 m)	4.53 s	1.55 s	2.59 s	4.19 s	6.84 s	33 in (0.84 m)	10 ft 0 in (3.05 m)	12 reps
All values from Pro Day

After not being selected in the 2025 NFL draft, Richardson signed with the Chicago Bears as an undrafted free agent. He was cut on August 26, 2025, before re–signing to the practice squad the next day. On January 20, 2026, he signed a reserve/futures contract with Chicago.

On August 30, 2026, Richardson was waived by the Bears as a part of final roster cuts; he was re-signed to the team's practice squad the following day.

== Personal life ==
Richardson comes from a football family – his grandfather, Rex, and his father, Bucky, both played in the NFL, and his uncle, Jeff Turner, played at Texas Tech.
