= Lauren Sisler =

American sports journalist

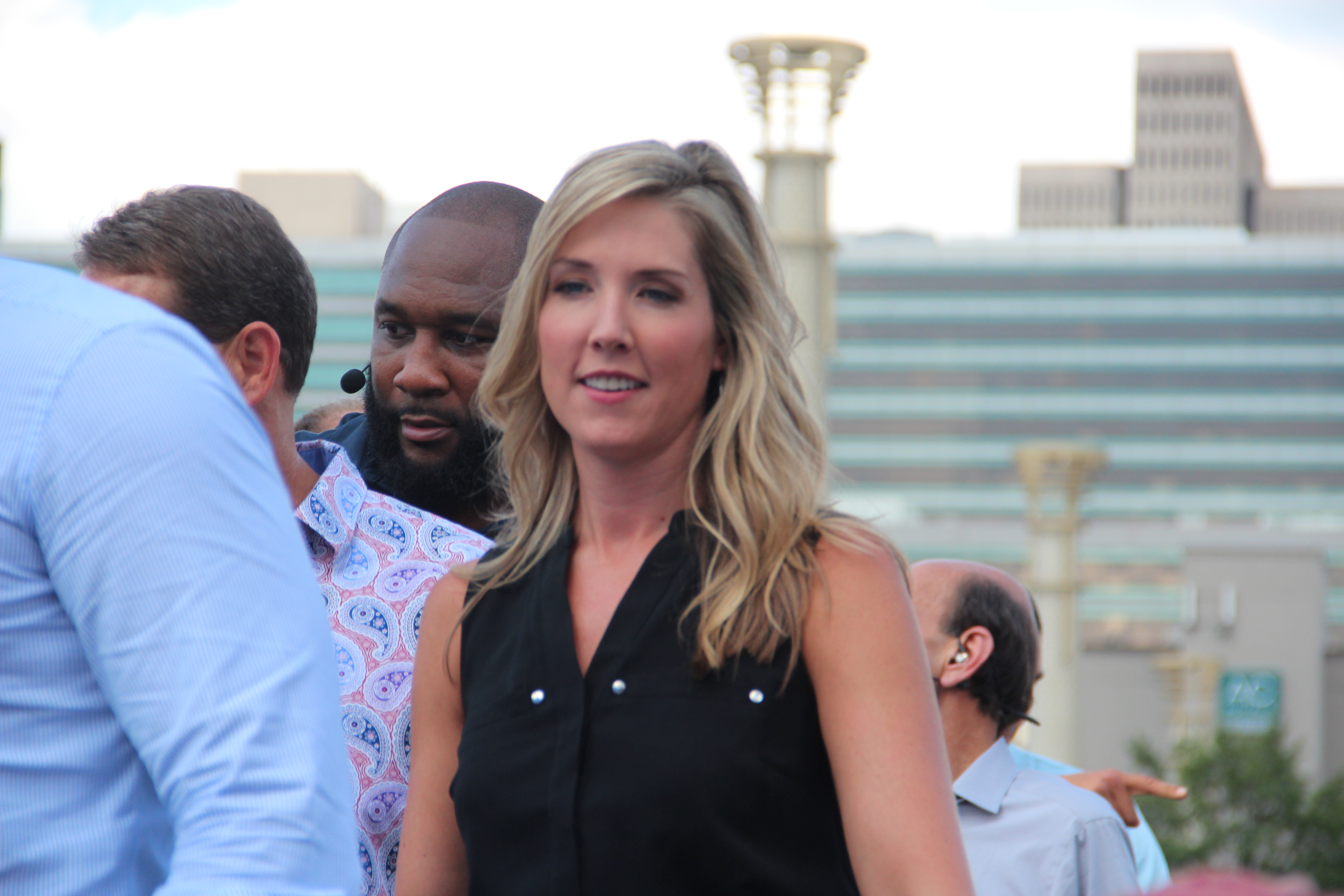
- Sisler at the 2018 SEC Summerfest
- Born: October 10, 1984 (age 41); Roanoke, Virginia, U.S.
- Education: Rutgers University
- Occupations: Sports Reporter, Journalist
- Employer: ESPN

Lauren Sisler is a sports broadcaster who joined ESPN and SEC Network in 2016 as a sideline reporter for both college football and gymnastics. In 2017, she became a reporter for SEC Nation. In addition, she continues to serve as a sports reporter and host at AL.com.

== Early life and education ==
Sisler is a native of Roanoke, Virginia, she graduated from Giles High School, the same high school where future ESPN co-worker Marty Smith (reporter) attended. She was the captain of her gymnastics team at Rutgers University and graduated in 2006 with a communication degree and honors from the School, Information and Library Studies (SCILS). She worked at the Rutgers University Television Network as a sports reporter and segment producer and had an internship at CNBC. Initially, she majored in Sports Medicine before changing to Communications.

== Career ==
Prior to working at ESPN, Sisler returned to her hometown of Roanoke, Virginia to start her career at WDBJ where she worked as a photographer and editor covering local high school and college sports before moving on to WTAP in West Virginia as a weekend sports anchor. Sisler then moved to Birmingham, Alabama to work at the CBS affiliate WIAT. In 2014 and 2015, she was named Best Sports Anchor by the Alabama Associated Press. In June 2017, she was awarded a regional Emmy for producing an interview between Charles Barkley and Nick Saban.

== "The Sideline Shimmy" ==
Sisler has become a YouTube sensation for "the sideline shimmy," a dance she first burst into during a game she was broadcasting early in her ESPN career to help her shake her nerves about being on camera. "What I started doing was dancing on the sidelines, because really, it helped me to take that nervous, anxious, excited energy, that was paired with adrenaline, that had me going a million miles an hour, helped me to slow down and just soak it all in," she said.

"And so dancing became my thing. What I realized? Never assume the cameras aren't rolling. They're always watching. And so these silly dances made their way to my inbox or my cell phone, I'd get blown up with text messages, 'Hey, we caught this on camera.' And I'm like, 'Oh. Okay.' So then, of course, I ended up posting these silly things on social media. And I think the coolest part about it is it has turned into something more than I ever imagined it would with the sideline shimmy."

== Personal life ==
On March 24, 2003, while a freshman at Rutgers University, Sisler unexpectedly lost both of her parents, Lesley and George Sisler, to prescription drug overdoses within hours of each other. Losing her parents provided a devastating blow to Sisler and she was unsure about the future. Her aunt and uncle convinced her to return to Rutgers, where she struggled before regaining control of her life. She speaks about the dangers of addiction and is involved with a few organizations. She has a brother Allen who served 12 years in the Navy. She is a Christian. She is married to John Willard.

== Memoir ==
Released Oct. 1, 2024, Sisler documented the story of her parents' deaths and how sharing her story to help others has helped her in her memoir, Shatterproof: How I Overcame the Shame of Losing My Parents to Opioid Addiction (and Found My Sideline Shimmy). “I realized that holding in their secrets and holding in the shame [they had surrounding their drug use] didn’t serve my parents well,” she said. “And it didn’t serve those around them well. And then, as I started telling more people the truth, I realized that people who loved my parents didn’t think any differently of them. If anything, they found peace in knowing what happened, and they didn’t love them any less, didn’t love me any less.”
