= Kenneth Almendares =

Honduran American football player (born 1999)

San Antonio Toros
- Position: Placekicker

Personal information
- Born: November 14, 1999 (age 26); San Pedro Sula, Honduras
- Listed height: 6 ft 2 in (1.88 m)
- Listed weight: 252 lb (114 kg)

Career information
- High school: Brazoswood (Clute, Texas, U.S.)
- College: Louisiana (2018–2024)
- NFL draft: 2025: undrafted

Career history
- San Antonio Toros (2026–present)

Awards and highlights
- Lou Groza Award (2024); Consensus All-American (2024); First-team All-Sun Belt (2024)

Kenneth Almendares (born November 14, 1999) is a Honduran American football placekicker. He played college football for the Louisiana Ragin' Cajuns. He won the 2024 Lou Groza Award as the top kicker in college football.

== Early life ==
Almendares was born on November 14, 1999, in San Pedro Sula, Honduras. His family is from Naco in the Cortés Department, and he moved with his parents to the U.S. at a young age. He played soccer growing up before being introduced to football while attending Brazoswood High School in Clute, Texas. He became a placekicker in football and was a standout for the school, being named their special teams MVP three years in a row. He was ranked the 48th-best kicker prospect nationally by Kohl's kicking and committed to the Louisiana Ragin' Cajuns.

== College career ==
Almendares appeared in three games as a freshman at Louisiana in 2018, being used as a kickoff specialist. He then was their main kickoff specialist in 2019, kicking 88 times for 5,319 yards. He then was used more at placekicker during the 2020 season, converting all five of his field goal attempts and all 23 of his extra point attempts. He appeared in four games in 2021, making four of five field goal attempts before missing the rest of the season due to injury. He made 18 of 23 field goals and 23 of 24 extra points in 2022, being the team's scoring leader with 77 total points.

In 2023, Almendares placed first on the team and ninth in the Sun Belt Conference (SBC) with a total of 92 points, having made 14 of 16 field goals and 50 of 51 extra points. As a senior in 2024, he broke the team and SBC record for single-season field goals, broke the SBC career field goals record and set the Louisiana records for career field goals, extra points and total points scored. He finished the regular season having made 27 of 29 field goals, being a four-time SBC special teams player of the week and being named first-team All-SBC, first-team All-American and the Lou Groza Award winner for best kicker nationally.

== Professional career ==
Almendares went unselected in the 2025 NFL draft. Almendares received an invitation to rookie minicamp with the San Francisco 49ers, but did not receive a contract from the team.

On March 16, 2026, Almendares signed with the San Antonio Toros of the Continental Football League. He was named All-CoFL Honorable Mention at the end of the season.
