= 2024 Conference USA football season =

- League: NCAA Division I Football Bowl Subdivision
- Sport: Football
- Duration: August 31 – December 6, 2024
- Games: 8 conference games per team
- Teams: 10

2025 NFL draft
- Top draft pick: Upton Stout, CB, Western Kentucky
- Picked by: San Francisco 49ers, 100th overall

Regular season
- Season champions: Jacksonville State
- Season MVP: Tyler Huff, QB, Jacksonville State

CUSA Championship Game
- Date: December 6, 2024
- Venue: AmFirst Stadium, Jacksonville, Alabama
- Champions: Jacksonville State
- Runners-up: Western Kentucky
- Finals MVP: Tyler Huff, QB, Jacksonville State

Seasons
- ← 2023 2025 →

2024 Conference USA football standings
	Conf.			Overall
Team	W		L	W		L
Jacksonville State y$	7	–	1	9	–	5
Western Kentucky y	6	–	2	8	–	6
Sam Houston	6	–	2	10	–	3
Liberty	5	–	3	8	–	4
Louisiana Tech	4	–	4	5	–	8
UTEP	3	–	5	3	–	9
FIU	3	–	5	4	–	8
New Mexico State	2	–	6	3	–	9
Middle Tennessee	2	–	6	3	–	9
Kennesaw State*	2	–	6	2	–	10
Championship: Jacksonville State 52, Western Kentucky 12
$ – Conference champion; y – Championship game participant; * – Ineligible for postseason play due to FCS-to-FBS transition rules

The 2024 Conference USA football season was the 29th season of college football play for Conference USA (CUSA). The season began on August 31, 2024, and concluded with the conference championship game on December 6, 2024. CUSA consisted of 10 members, and conference play was part of the 2024 NCAA Division I FBS football season.

== Conference realignment ==
For the 2024 season, Kennesaw State joined CUSA, moving up from NCAA Division I FCS to Division I FBS. Due to NCAA rules regarding transitioning from FCS to FBS, the school was ineligible for post-season play for the 2024 season.

The conference was set to expand further in 2025, with Delaware and Missouri State confirming that they would join CUSA for the 2025–26 academic year. The 2025 football season would be the second year of transition from FCS to FBS for both teams.

== Preseason ==
=== Preseason poll ===
The Conference USA preseason media poll was released on July 19. Liberty was named the favorite to win the conference.

Media poll
Predicted finish	Team	Votes (1st place)
1	Liberty	197 (18)
2	Western Kentucky	173 (2)
3	Jacksonville State	166
4	Middle Tennessee	98
t5	New Mexico State	97
t5	Sam Houston	97
7	Louisiana Tech	88
8	FIU	81
9	UTEP	76
10	Kennesaw State	27

=== Preseason player awards ===
Preseason player awards were announced on July 22.

- Offensive Player of the Year: Kaidon Salter (Junior, Liberty quarterback)
- Defensive Player of the Year: CJ Bazile Jr. (Junior, Liberty defensive end)
- Special Teams Player of the Year: Lucas Carneiro (Sophomore, Western Kentucky kicker)

== Head coaches ==
- On November 26, 2023, UTEP announced that it had fired head coach Dana Dimel after 6 seasons with the school. Dimel had posted a 20–49 record in his tenure. On December 4, 2023, UTEP announced Scotty Walden as the new head coach for the 2024 season. Walden had previously been head coach at Austin Peay.
- On November 27, 2023, Middle Tennessee announced that it had fired head coach Rick Stockstill after 18 seasons with the school. Stockstill had a 113–111 record during his tenure at the school. On December 6, 2023, Middle Tennessee announced Derek Mason as the new head coach for the 2024 season. Mason had previously been head coach at Vanderbilt.
- On December 23, 2023, New Mexico State head coach Jerry Kill announced that he was stepping down from the position. The school announced that wide receivers coach Tony Sanchez would be promoted to the head coach position for 2024.

Note: All stats shown are before the start of the 2024 season.

Team	Head coach	Years at school	Overall record	Record at school	CUSA record
FIU	Mike MacIntyre	3	54–81	8–16	3–13
Jacksonville State	Rich Rodriguez	3	181–125–2	18–6	6–2
Kennesaw State	Brian Bohannon	10	71–30	71–30	0–0
Liberty	Jamey Chadwell	2	112–58	13–1	8–0
Louisiana Tech	Sonny Cumbie	3	8–21	6–18	4–12
Middle Tennessee	Derek Mason	1	27–55	0–0	0–0
New Mexico State	Tony Sanchez	1	20–40	0–0	0–0
Sam Houston	K. C. Keeler	11	262–109–1	88–36	2–6
UTEP	Scotty Walden	1	34–20	0–0	0–0
Western Kentucky	Tyson Helton	6	40–26	40–26	28–11

=== Mid-season changes ===
- On November 10, Kennesaw State head coach Brian Bohannon announced that he was stepping down from the position, effective immediately. Kennesaw State named Co-offesnive coordinator Chandler Burks the interim head coach for the remainder of the season. On December 1, Kennesaw State announced Jerry Mack as the new head coach. Mack had previously been the running backs coach of the Jacksonville Jaguars in the NFL.
- On December 1, K. C. Keeler was announced as the new head coach of Temple in the American Athletic Conference. Offensive coordinator Brad Cornelsen was named Sam Houston's interim head coach for Sam Houston's bowl game.
- On December 12, Rich Rodriguez was named as the new head coach of West Virginia in the Big 12 Conference. Jacksonville State's offensive coordinator Rod Smith was named the interim head coach for the team's bowl game.

=== Post-season changes ===
- On December 1, FIU announced they had fired head coach Mike MacIntyre. On December 7, FIU named Willie Simmons as their new head coach for the 2025 season. Simmons had previously been the running backs coach at Duke.

== Rankings ==
		Pre	Wk 1	Wk 2	Wk 3	Wk 4	Wk 5	Wk 6	Wk 7	Wk 8	Wk 9	Wk 10	Wk 11	Wk 12	Wk 13	Wk 14	Wk 15	Final
FIU	AP																	
FIU	C																	
FIU	CFP	Not released																
Jacksonville State	AP																	
Jacksonville State	C																RV	
Jacksonville State	CFP	Not released																
Kennesaw State	AP																	
Kennesaw State	C																	
Kennesaw State	CFP	Not released																
Liberty	AP	RV	RV	RV	RV	RV			RV	RV								
Liberty	C	RV	RV	RV	RV	RV	RV	RV	RV	RV								
Liberty	CFP	Not released																
Louisiana Tech	AP																	
Louisiana Tech	C																	
Louisiana Tech	CFP	Not released																
Middle Tennessee	AP																	
Middle Tennessee	C																	
Middle Tennessee	CFP	Not released																
New Mexico State	AP																	
New Mexico State	C																	
New Mexico State	CFP	Not released																
Sam Houston	AP																	
Sam Houston	C													RV				
Sam Houston	CFP	Not released																
UTEP	AP																	
UTEP	C																	
UTEP	CFP	Not released																
Western Kentucky	AP																	
Western Kentucky	C																	
Western Kentucky	CFP	Not released																

Legend
	Improvement in ranking
	Drop in ranking
	Not ranked previous week
	No change in ranking from previous week
RV	Received votes but were not ranked in Top 25 of poll
т	Tied with team above or below also with this symbol

== Schedule ==
Index to colors and formatting
CUSA member won
CUSA member lost
CUSA teams in **bold**

The 2024 schedule was released on February 1, 2024.

All times Eastern time.

=== Week 1 ===
Date	Time	Visiting team	Home team	Site	TV	Result	Attendance	Ref.
August 29	8:00 p.m.	Coastal Carolina	**Jacksonville State**	AmFirst Stadium • Jacksonville, AL	CBSSN	**L** 27–55	18,977	
August 31	3:30 p.m.	**Kennesaw State**	UTSA	Alamodome • San Antonio, TX	ESPN+	**L** 16–28	25,911	
August 31	3:30 p.m.	**UTEP**	Nebraska	Memorial Stadium • Lincoln, NE	FOX	**L** 7–40	86,072	
August 31	3:30 p.m.	**FIU**	Indiana	Memorial Stadium • Bloomington, IN	BTN	**L** 7–31	44,150	
August 31	6:00 p.m.	Campbell	**Liberty**	Williams Stadium • Lynchburg, VA	ESPN+	**W** 41–24	21,573	
August 31	7:00 p.m.	**Western Kentucky**	No. 5 Alabama	Bryant–Denny Stadium • Tuscaloosa, AL	ESPN	**L** 0–63	100,077	
August 31	7:00 p.m.	Tennessee Tech	**Middle Tennessee**	Johnny "Red" Floyd Stadium • Murfreesboro, TN	ESPN+	**W** 32–25	16,000	
August 31	7:00 p.m.	**Sam Houston**	Rice	Rice Stadium • Houston, TX	ESPN+	**W** 34–14	17,298	
August 31	8:00 p.m.	No. 23 (FCS) Nicholls	**Louisiana Tech**	Joe Aillet Stadium • Ruston, LA	ESPN+	**W** 25–17	16,570	
August 31	9:00 p.m.	Southeast Missouri State	**New Mexico State**	Aggie Memorial Stadium • Las Cruces, NM	ESPN+	**W** 23–16	10,738	
^{#}Rankings from AP Poll released prior to game. All times are in Eastern Time.

=== Week 2 ===
Date	Time	Visiting team	Home team	Site	TV	Result	Attendance	Ref.
September 7	3:30 p.m.	**Jacksonville State**	No. 22 Louisville	L&N Federal Credit Union Stadium • Louisville, KY	ACCNX	**L** 14–49	48,575	
September 7	4:15 p.m.	**Middle Tennessee**	No. 6 Ole Miss	Vaught–Hemingway Stadium • University, MS	SECN	**L** 3–52	66,427	
September 7	6:00 p.m.	Central Michigan	**FIU**	Pitbull Stadium • Miami, FL	ESPN+	**W** 52–16	17,852	
September 7	6:30 p.m.	**Sam Houston**	UCF	FBC Mortgage Stadium • Orlando, FL	ESPN+	**L** 14–45	43,807	
September 7	7:00 p.m.	Louisiana	**Kennesaw State**	Fifth Third Stadium • Kennesaw, GA	ESPN+	**L** 10–34	11,040	
September 7	7:00 p.m.	Eastern Kentucky	**Western Kentucky**	Houchens Industries–L. T. Smith Stadium • Bowling Green, KY (Battle of the Bluegrass)	ESPN+	**W** 31–0	16,712	
September 7	9:00 p.m.	Southern Utah	**UTEP**	Sun Bowl • El Paso, TX	ESPN+	**L** 24–27 ^{OT}	41,609	
September 7	10:15 p.m.	**Liberty**	**New Mexico State**	Aggie Memorial Stadium • Las Cruces, NM	ESPN2	**LIB** 30–24	16,562	
^{#}Rankings from AP Poll released prior to game. All times are in Eastern Time.

=== Week 3 ===
Date	Time	Visiting team	Home team	Site	TV	Result	Attendance	Ref.
September 14	12:00 p.m.	**Louisiana Tech**	NC State	Carter–Finley Stadium • Raleigh, NC	ACCN	**L** 20–30	56,919	
September 14	6:00 p.m.	**FIU**	Florida Atlantic	FAU Stadium • Boca Raton, FL (Shula Bowl)	ESPN+	**L** 20–38	24,283	
September 14	6:00 p.m.	**UTEP**	**Liberty**	Williams Stadium • Lynchburg, VA	ESPN+	**LIB** 28–10	21,805	
September 14	7:00 p.m.	**Jacksonville State**	Eastern Michigan	Rynearson Stadium • Ypsilanti, MI	ESPN+	**L** 34–37 ^{2OT}	17,501	
September 14	7:00 p.m.	**Western Kentucky**	**Middle Tennessee**	Johnny "Red" Floyd Stadium • Murfreesboro, TN (100 Miles of Hate)	ESPN+	**WKU** 49–21	12,227	
September 14	7:00 p.m.	Hawaii	**Sam Houston**	Bowers Stadium • Huntsville, TX	ESPN+	**W** 31–13	15,134	
September 14	7:00 p.m.	**Kennesaw State**	San Jose State	CEFCU Stadium • San Jose, CA	TruTV	**L** 10–31	11,090	
September 14	10:30 p.m.	**New Mexico State**	Fresno State	Valley Children's Stadium • Fresno, CA	TruTV	**L** 0–48	39,079	
^{#}Rankings from AP Poll released prior to game. All times are in Eastern Time.

=== Week 4 ===
Date	Time	Visiting team	Home team	Site	TV	Result	Attendance	Ref.
September 21	3:00 p.m.	Southern Miss	**Jacksonville State**	AmFirst Stadium • Jacksonville, AL	ESPN+	**W** 44–7	21,788	
September 21	4:00 p.m.	Duke	**Middle Tennessee**	Johnny "Red" Floyd Stadium • Murfreesboro, TN	ESPNU	**L** 17–45	15,209	
September 21	6:00 p.m.	Monmouth	**FIU**	Pitbull Stadium • Miami, FL	ESPN+	**L** 42–45	17,922	
September 21	6:00 p.m.	**UTEP**	Colorado State	Canvas Stadium • Fort Collins, CO	TruTV	**L** 17–27	29,151	
September 21	6:00 p.m.	East Carolina	**Liberty**	Williams Stadium • Lynchburg, VA	ESPN+	**W** 35–24	24,076	
September 21	7:00 p.m.	Tulsa	**Louisiana Tech**	Joe Aillet Stadium • Ruston, LA	ESPN+	**L** 20–23 ^{OT}	18,152	
September 21	7:00 p.m.	**New Mexico State**	**Sam Houston**	Bowers Stadium • Huntsville, TX	ESPN+	**SHSU** 31–11		
September 21	7:00 p.m.	Toledo	**Western Kentucky**	Houchens Industries–L. T. Smith Stadium • Bowling Green, KY	ESPN+	**W** 26–21	19,127	
^{#}Rankings from AP Poll released prior to game. All times are in Eastern Time.

=== Week 5 ===
Date	Time	Visiting team	Home team	Site	TV	Result	Attendance	Ref.
September 28	12:00 p.m.	**Western Kentucky**	Boston College	Alumni Stadium • Chestnut Hill, MA	ACCN	**L** 20–21	41,403	
September 28	3:00 p.m.	Texas State	**Sam Houston**	NRG Stadium • Houston, TX	ESPN+	**W** 40–39	27,225	
September 28	3:30 p.m.	**Liberty**	Appalachian State	Kidd Brewer Stadium • Boone, NC	ESPN+	Canceled		
September 28	6:00 p.m.	UT Martin	**Kennesaw State**	Fifth Third Stadium • Kennesaw, GA	ESPN+	**L** 13–24	10,847	
September 28	6:00 p.m.	**Louisiana Tech**	**FIU**	Pitbull Stadium • Miami, FL	ESPN+	**FIU** 17–10	12,425	
September 28	7:30 p.m.	**Middle Tennessee**	Memphis	Simmons Bank Liberty Stadium • Memphis, TN	ESPNU	**L** 7–24	25,266	
September 28	8:00 p.m.	New Mexico	**New Mexico State**	Aggie Memorial Stadium • Las Cruces, NM (Rio Grande Rivalry)	ESPN+	**L** 40–50	21,062	
^{#}Rankings from AP Poll released prior to game. All times are in Eastern Time.

=== Week 6 ===
Date	Time	Visiting team	Home team	Site	TV	Result	Attendance	Ref.
October 3	9:00 p.m.	**Sam Houston**	**UTEP**	Sun Bowl • El Paso, TX	CBSSN	**SHSU** 41–21	14,454	
October 4	7:00 p.m.	**Jacksonville State**	**Kennesaw State**	Fifth Third Stadium • Kennesaw, GA	CBSSN	**JVST** 63–24	10,029	
^{#}Rankings from AP Poll released prior to game. All times are in Eastern Time.

=== Week 7 ===
Date	Time	Visiting team	Home team	Site	TV	Result	Attendance	Ref.
October 8	7:00 p.m.	**FIU**	**Liberty**	Williams Stadium • Lynchburg, VA	CBSSN	**LIB** 31–24 ^{OT}	16,343	
October 9	7:30 p.m.	**New Mexico State**	**Jacksonville State**	AmFirst Stadium • Jacksonville, AL	ESPN2	**JVST** 54–13	16,555	
October 10	8:00 p.m.	**Middle Tennessee**	**Louisiana Tech**	Joe Aillet Stadium • Ruston, LA	CBSSN	**LT** 48–21	15,072	
October 10	8:00 p.m.	**UTEP**	**Western Kentucky**	Houchens Industries–L. T. Smith Stadium • Bowling Green, KY	ESPNU	**WKU** 44–17	12,723	
^{#}Rankings from AP Poll released prior to game. All times are in Eastern Time.

=== Week 8 ===
Date	Time	Visiting team	Home team	Site	TV	Result	Attendance	Ref.
October 15	8:00 p.m.	**Kennesaw State**	**Middle Tennessee**	Johnny "Red" Floyd Stadium • Murfreesboro, TN	CBSSN	**MTSU** 14–5	10,200	
October 15	9:00 p.m.	**Louisiana Tech**	**New Mexico State**	Aggie Memorial Stadium • Las Cruces, NM	ESPNU	**NMSU** 33–30 ^{2OT}	9,671	
October 16	8:00 p.m.	**Western Kentucky**	**Sam Houston**	Bowers Stadium • Huntsville, TX	ESPN2	**WKU** 31–14	8,914	
October 16	9:00 p.m.	**FIU**	**UTEP**	Sun Bowl • El Paso, TX	CBSSN	**UTEP** 30–21	11,373	
^{#}Rankings from AP Poll released prior to game. All times are in Eastern Time.

=== Week 9 ===
Date	Time	Visiting team	Home team	Site	TV	Result	Attendance	Ref.
October 22	7:30 p.m.	**Sam Houston**	**FIU**	Pitbull Stadium • Miami, FL	ESPNU	**SHSU** 10–7	10,625	
October 22	8:00 p.m.	**UTEP**	**Louisiana Tech**	Joe Aillet Stadium • Ruston, LA	CBSSN	**LT** 14–10	15,168	
October 23	7:00 p.m.	**Liberty**	**Kennesaw State**	Fifth Third Stadium • Kennesaw, GA	CBSSN	**KENN** 27–24	8,209	
October 23	7:30 p.m.	**Middle Tennessee**	**Jacksonville State**	AmFirst Stadium • Jacksonville, AL	ESPN2	**JVST** 42–20	17,988	
^{#}Rankings from AP Poll released prior to game. All times are in Eastern Time.

=== Week 10 ===
Date	Time	Visiting team	Home team	Site	TV	Result	Attendance	Ref.
October 29	7:00 p.m.	**New Mexico State**	**FIU**	Pitbull Stadium • Miami, FL	CBSSN	**FIU** 34–13	9,103	
October 29	8:00 p.m.	**Louisiana Tech**	**Sam Houston**	Bowers Stadium • Huntsville, TX	ESPNU	**SHSU** 9–3	9,128	
October 30	7:00 p.m.	**Jacksonville State**	**Liberty**	Williams Stadium • Lynchburg, VA	CBSSN	**JVST** 31–21	18,069	
October 30	7:30 p.m.	**Kennesaw Sate**	**Western Kentucky**	Houchens Industries–L. T. Smith Stadium • Bowling Green, KY	ESPN2	**WKU** 31–14	14,547	
November 2	3:30 p.m.	**Middle Tennessee**	**UTEP**	Sun Bowl • El Paso, TX	CBSSN	**MTSU** 20–13	14,775	
^{#}Rankings from AP Poll released prior to game. All times are in Eastern Time.

=== Week 11 ===
Date	Time	Visiting team	Home team	Site	TV	Result	Attendance	Ref.
November 9	1:00 p.m.	**Liberty**	**Middle Tennessee**	Johnny "Red" Floyd Stadium • Murfreesboro, TN	CBSSN	**LIB** 37–17	13,500	
November 9	4:00 p.m.	**Kennesaw State**	**UTEP**	Sun Bowl • El Paso, TX	ESPN+	**UTEP** 43–35 ^{2OT}	14,728	
November 9	4:30 p.m.	**Jacksonville State**	**Louisiana Tech**	Joe Aillet Stadium • Ruston, LA	CBSSN	**JVST** 44–37 ^{OT}	16,345	
November 9	6:00 p.m.	**Western Kentucky**	**New Mexico State**	Aggie Memorial Stadium • Las Cruces, NM	ESPN+	**WKU** 41–28	12,710	
^{#}Rankings from AP Poll released prior to game. All times are in Eastern Time.

=== Week 12 ===
Date	Time	Visiting team	Home team	Site	TV	Result	Attendance	Ref.
November 16	12:00 p.m.	**Louisiana Tech**	**Western Kentucky**	Houchens Industries–L. T. Smith Stadium • Bowling Green, KY	CBSSN	**LT** 12–7	13,312	
November 16	12:00 p.m.	**Liberty**	UMass	McGuirk Alumni Stadium • Hadley, MA	ESPN+	**W** 35–34 ^{OT}	9,115	
November 16	2:00 p.m.	**FIU**	**Jacksonville State**	AmFirst Stadium • Jacksonville, AL	ESPN+	**JVST** 34–31	17,688	
November 16	3:00 p.m.	**Sam Houston**	**Kennesaw State**	Fifth Third Stadium • Kennesaw, GA	ESPN+	**SHSU** 23–17 ^{OT}	7,736	
November 16	7:45 p.m.	**New Mexico State**	No. 15 Texas A&M	Kyle Field • College Station, TX	SECN	**L** 3–38	105,815	
^{#}Rankings from AP Poll released prior to game. All times are in Eastern Time.

=== Week 13 ===
Date	Time	Visiting team	Home team	Site	TV	Result	Attendance	Ref.
November 23	12:00 p.m.	Sam Houston	**Jacksonville State**	AmFirst Stadium • Jacksonville, AL	CBSSN	**JVST** 21–11	16,312	
November 23	1:00 p.m.	Western Kentucky	**Liberty**	Williams Stadium • Lynchburg, VA	ESPN+	**LIB** 38–21	17,930	
November 23	1:00 p.m.	UTEP	No. 11 Tennessee	Neyland Stadium • Knoxville, TN	ESPN+/SECN+	**L** 0–56	101,915	
November 23	2:30 p.m.	New Mexico State	**Middle Tennessee**	Johnny "Red" Floyd Stadium • Murfreesboro, TN	ESPN+	**NMSU** 36–21	10,123	
November 23	3:00 p.m.	FIU	**Kennesaw State**	Fifth Third Stadium • Kennesaw, GA	ESPN+	**KENN** 27–26	6,210	
November 23	4:00 p.m.	Louisiana Tech	Arkansas	Donald W. Reynolds Razorback Stadium • Fayetteville, AR	ESPN+/SECN+	**L** 14–35	66,041	
^{#}Rankings from AP Poll released prior to game. All times are in Eastern Time.

=== Week 14 ===
Date	Time	Visiting team	Home team	Site	TV	Result	Attendance	Ref.
November 29	3:30 p.m.	**Liberty**	**Sam Houston**	Bowers Stadium • Huntsville, TX	CBSSN	**SHSU** 20–18		
November 30	2:00 p.m.	**Middle Tennessee**	**FIU**	Pitbull Stadium • Miami, FL	ESPN+	**FIU** 35–24		
November 30	4:00 p.m.	**Kennesaw State**	**Louisiana Tech**	Joe Aillet Stadium • Ruston, LA	ESPN+	**LT** 33–0		
November 30	4:00 p.m.	**Jacksonville State**	**Western Kentucky**	Houchens Industries–L. T. Smith Stadium • Bowling Green, KY	ESPNU	**WKU** 19–17		
November 30	4:00 p.m.	**UTEP**	**New Mexico State**	Aggie Memorial Stadium • Las Cruces, NM (Battle of I-10)	ESPN+	**UTEP** 42–35		
^{#}Rankings from AP Poll released prior to game. All times are in Eastern Time.

=== Conference USA Championship Game ===
Date	Time	Visiting team	Home team	Site	TV	Result	Attendance	Ref.
December 6	8:00 p.m.	**Western Kentucky**	**Jacksonville State**	AmFirst Stadium • Jacksonville, AL	CBSSN	**JVST** 52–12		
^{#}Rankings from AP Poll released prior to game. All times are in Eastern Time.

== Postseason ==
=== Bowl Games ===
Legend
CUSA win
CUSA loss

Bowl game	Date	Site	Television	Time (EST)	CUSA team	Opponent	Score	Attendance
Boca Raton Bowl	December 18	FAU Stadium • Boca Raton, FL	ESPN	5:30 p.m.	Western Kentucky	James Madison	L 17–27	15,808
New Orleans Bowl	December 19	Caesars Superdome • New Orleans, LA	ESPN2	7:00 p.m.	Sam Houston	Georgia Southern	W 31–26	13,151
Cure Bowl	December 20	Camping World Stadium • Orlando, FL	ESPN	12:00 p.m.	Jacksonville State	Ohio	L 27–30	10,518
Independence Bowl	December 28	Independence Stadium • Shreveport, LA	ESPN	9:15 p.m.	Louisiana Tech^{1}	No. 22 Army	L 6–27	34,283
Bahamas Bowl	January 4, 2025	Thomas Robinson Stadium • Nassau, The Bahamas	ESPN2	11:00 a.m.	Liberty	Buffalo	L 7–26	4,610

- ^{1} Louisiana Tech was bowl ineligible with a 5–7 record, but was selected to compete in the Independence Bowl after Marshall withdrew.

== Conference USA records vs other conferences ==
2024–2025 records against non-conference foes:

Power conferences 5	Record
ACC	0–4
Big Ten	0–2
Big 12	0–1
Notre Dame	0–0
Pac-12	0–0
SEC	0–5
Power 5 Total	0–10
Other FBS conferences	Record
American	2–4
Independents (Excluding Notre Dame)	1–0
MAC	2–1
Mountain West	1–4
Sun Belt	2–2
Other FBS total	8–11
FCS opponents	Record
Football Championship Subdivision	5–3
Total non-conference record	11–24

=== Conference USA vs power 5 matchups ===
This is a list of games CUSA teams scheduled against power conference teams (ACC, Big 10, Big 12, Pac-12, Notre Dame and SEC). All rankings are from the current AP Poll at the time of the game.

Date	Conference	Visitor	Home	Site	Score
August 31	Big Ten	FIU	Indiana	Memorial Stadium • Bloomington, IN	L 7–31
August 31	Big Ten	UTEP	Nebraska	Memorial Stadium • Lincoln, NE	L 7–40
August 31	SEC	Western Kentucky	No. 5 Alabama	Bryant–Denny Stadium • Tuscaloosa, AL	L 0–63
September 7	ACC	Jacksonville State	No. 22 Louisville	L&N Federal Credit Union Stadium • Louisville, KY	L 14–49
September 7	SEC	Middle Tennessee	No. 6 Ole Miss	Vaught–Hemingway Stadium • Oxford, MS	L 3–52
September 7	Big 12	Sam Houston	UCF	FBC Mortgage Stadium • Orlando, FL	L 14–45
September 14	ACC	Louisiana Tech	NC State	Carter–Finley Stadium • Raleigh, NC	L 20–30
September 21	ACC	Duke	Middle Tennessee	Johnny "Red" Floyd Stadium • Murfreesboro, TN	L 17–45
September 28	ACC	Western Kentucky	Boston College	Alumni Stadium • Chestnut Hill, MA	L 20–21
November 16	SEC	New Mexico State	Texas A&M	Kyle Field • College Station, TX	L 3–38
November 23	SEC	Louisiana Tech	Arkansas	Donald W. Reynolds Razorback Stadium • Fayetteville, AR	L 14–35
November 23	SEC	UTEP	Tennessee	Neyland Stadium • Knoxville, TN	L 0–56

=== Conference USA vs group of five matchups ===
The following games include CUSA teams competing against teams from the American, MAC, Mountain West, or Sun Belt.

Date	Conference	Visitor	Home	Site	Score
August 31	Sun Belt	Coastal Carolina	Jacksonville State	AmFirst Stadium • Jacksonville, AL	L 27–55
August 31	American	Kennesaw State	UTSA	Alamodome • San Antonio, TX	L 16–28
August 31	American	Sam Houston	Rice	Rice Stadium • Houston, TX	W 34–14
September 7	MAC	Central Michigan	FIU	Pitbull Stadium • Miami, FL	W 52–16
September 7	Sun Belt	Louisiana	Kennesaw State	Fifth Third Stadium • Kennesaw, GA	L 10–34
September 14	American	FIU	Florida Atlantic	FAU Stadium • Boca Raton, FL	L 20–38
September 14	MAC	Jacksonville State	Eastern Michigan	Rynearson Stadium • Ypsilanti, MI	L 34–37 OT
September 14	Mountain West	Kennesaw State	San Jose State	CEFCU Stadium • San Jose, CA	L 10–31
September 14	Mountain West	New Mexico State	Fresno State	Valley Children's Stadium • Fresno, CA	L 0–48
September 14	Mountain West	Hawaii	Sam Houston	Bowers Stadium • Huntsville, TX	W 31–14
September 21	Sun Belt	Southern Miss	Jacksonville State	AmFirst Stadium • Jacksonville, AL	W 44–7
September 21	American	East Carolina	Liberty	Williams Stadium • Lynchburg, VA	W 35–24
September 21	American	Tulsa	Louisiana Tech	Joe Aillet Stadium • Ruston, LA	L 20–23 OT
September 21	Mountain West	UTEP	Colorado State	Canvas Stadium • Fort Collins, CO	L 17–27
September 21	MAC	Toledo	Western Kentucky	Houchens Industries–L. T. Smith Stadium • Bowling Green, KY	W 26–21
September 28	Sun Belt	Liberty	Appalachian State	Kidd Brewer Stadium • Boone, NC	Canceled
September 28	Mountain West	New Mexico	New Mexico State	Aggie Memorial Stadium • Las Cruces, NM	L 40–50
September 28	American	Middle Tennessee	Memphis	Simmons Bank Liberty Stadium • Memphis, TN	L 7–24
September 28	Sun Belt	Texas State	Sam Houston	NRG Stadium • Houston, TX	W 40–39

=== Conference USA vs FBS independents matchups ===
The following games include CUSA teams competing against FBS independents, which includes UConn or UMass.

Date	Visitor	Home	Site	Score
November 16	Liberty	UMass	McGuirk Alumni Stadium • Hadley, MA	W 35–34 OT

=== Conference USA vs FCS matchups ===
Date	Visitor	Home	Site	Score
August 31	Campbell	Liberty	Williams Stadium • Lynchburg, VA	W 41–24
August 31	No. 23 (FCS) Nicholls	Louisiana Tech	Joe Aillet Stadium • Ruston, LA	W 25–17
August 31	Tennessee Tech	Middle Tennessee	Johnny "Red" Floyd Stadium • Murfreesboro, TN	W 32–25
August 31	Southeast Missouri State	New Mexico State	Aggie Memorial Stadium • Las Cruces, NM	W 23–16
September 7	Southern Utah	UTEP	Sun Bowl • El Paso, TX	L 24–27
September 7	Eastern Kentucky	Western Kentucky	Houchens Industries–L. T. Smith Stadium • Bowling Green, KY	W 31–0
September 21	Monmouth	FIU	Pitbull Stadium • Miami, FL	L 42–45
September 28	UT Martin	Kennesaw State	Fifth Third Stadium • Kennesaw, GA	L 13–24

== Awards and honors ==
=== CUSA individual awards ===
On December 16, 2024, CUSA released their individual award winners and all-conference honors for the 2024 season.

Award	Honoree	School
Most Valuable Player	Tyler Huff	Jacksonville State
Offensive Player of the Year	Caden Veltkamp	Western Kentucky
Defensive Player of the Year	Travion Barnes	FIU
Special Teams Player of the Year	Lucas Carneiro	Western Kentucky
Freshman of the Year	DJ McKinney	Sam Houston
Newcomer of the Year	Tyler Huff	Jacksonville State
Coach of the Year	Rich Rodriguez	Jacksonville State

First-team all-conference offense
Pos.	Player	School
QB	Tyler Huff	Jacksonville State
RB	Tre Stewart	Western Kentucky
RB	Quinton Cooley	Liberty
WR	Eric Rivers	FIU
WR	Omari Kelly	Middle Tennessee
WR	Tru Edwards	Louisiana Tech
TE	Holden Willis	Middle Tennessee
OL	Jordan White	Liberty
OL	Clay Webb	Jacksonville State
OL	Xavior Gray	Liberty
OL	Aaron Fenimore	Liberty
OL	Will O'Steen	Jacksonville State

First-team all-conference defense
Pos.	Player	School
DE	Maurice Westmoreland	UTEP
DT	David Blay	Louisiana Tech
DT	Hosea Wheeler	Western Kentucky
DE	Chris Murray	Sam Houston
LB	Travion Barnes	FIU
LB	Reginald Hughes	Jacksonville State
LB	Kavian Gaither	Sam Houston
DB	Fred Perry	Jacksonville State
DB	Caleb Weaver	Sam Houston
DB	Upton Stout	Western Kentucky
DB	JoJo Evans	FIU

First-team all-conference special teams
Pos.	Player	School
K	Lucas Carneiro	Western Kentucky
P	Jacob Ulrich	Kennesaw State
KR	Qua Ashley	Kennesaw State
PR	Kam Thomas	UTEP
LS	Brody Butler	Middle Tennessee

Second-team all-conference offense
Pos.	Player	School
QB	Caden Veltkamp	Western Kentucky
RB	Seth McGowan	New Mexico State
RB	Mike Washington	New Mexico State
WR	Kisean Johnson	Western Kentucky
WR	Kenny Odom	UTEP
WR	Dean Patterson	FIU
TE	Carson Kent	Kennesaw State
OL	Ethan Hagler	Sam Houston
OL	AJ Vaipulu	New Mexico State
OL	Quantavious Leslie	Western Kentucky
OL	James Dawn II	Sam Houston
OL	Marshall Jackson	Western Kentucky

Second-team all-conference defense
Pos.	Player	School
DE	J-Rock Swain	Jacksonville State
DT	Kyran Duhon	UTEP
DT	Jeramy Passmore	FIU
DE	TJ Bush	Liberty
LB	Joseph Carter	Liberty
LB	Kolbe Fields	Louisiana Tech
LB	Tyler Martinez	New Mexico State
DB	Devonte' Mathews	Western Kentucky
DB	Geimere Latimer	Jacksonville State
DB	JeRico Washington Jr.	Kennesaw State
DB	Brylan Green	Liberty

Second-team all-conference special teams
Pos.	Player	School
K	Abraham Montaño	New Mexico State
P	George Eberle	New Mexico State
KR	C'Quan Jnopierre	FIU
PR	Omari Kelly	Middle Tennessee
LS	Rex Robich	Western Kentucky

Freshman all-conference offense
Pos.	Player	School
QB	Evan Bullock	Louisiana Tech
RB	DJ McKinney	Sam Houston
RB	Jekail Middlebrook	Middle Tennessee
WR	TJ Pride	New Mexico State
WR	Cam Vaughn	Jacksonville State
WR	Cameron Flowers	Western Kentucky
TE	Martavious Collins	UTEP
OL	Jacob Norcross	Kennesaw State
OL	Jaheim Buchanon	FIU
OL	Amare Grayson	Jacksonville State
OL	Kolt Deiterich	Sam Houston
OL	BJ Tolo	New Mexico State

Freshman all-conference defense
Pos.	Player	School
DE	Anthony Bynum	Middle Tennessee
DT	Shakai Woods	Middle Tennessee
DT	Malaki Ta'ase	New Mexico State
DE	Kyran Duhon	UTEP
LB	Stratton Shufelt	UTEP
LB	Jaylin Jones	UTEP
LB	Lofton Howard	Western Kentucky
DB	Zechariah Poyser	Jacksonville State
DB	JeRico Washington Jr.	Kennesaw State
DB	Tayden Barnes	New Mexico State
DB	Isaac Paul	Kennesaw State

Freshman all-conference special teams
Pos.	Player	School
K	Garrison Rippa	Jacksonville State
P	Jacob Ulrich	Kennesaw State

=== Player of the week honors ===
Week	Offensive			Defensive			Special Teams		
Week	Player	Team	Position	Player	Team	Position	Player	Team	Position
Week 1	Hunter Watson	Sam Houston	QB	Tayden Barnes	New Mexico State	CB	Christian Pavon	Sam Houston	K
Week 2	Keyone Jenkins	FIU	QB	CJ Bazile Jr.	Liberty	DE	Colin Karhu	Liberty	K
Week 3	Caden Veltkamp	Western Kentucky	QB	Caleb Weaver	Sam Houston	S	Buck Buchanan	Louisiana Tech	K
Week 4	Reese Smith	Liberty	WR	Devonte’ Mathews	Western Kentucky	DB	Cole Maynard	Western Kentucky	P
Week 5	Hunter Watson (2)	Sam Houston	QB	Travion Barnes	FIU	LB	Christian Pavon (2)	Sam Houston	K
Week 6	Tyler Huff	Jacksonville State	QB	Zechariah Poyser	Jacksonville State	S	Jadon Cardell	Sam Houston	P
Week 7	Evan Bullock	Louisiana Tech	QB	Travion Barnes (2)	FIU	LB	Lucas Carneiro	Western Kentucky	K
Week 8	Caden Veltkamp (2)	Western Kentucky	QB	Kale Edwards	New Mexico State	DE	Omari Kelly	Middle Tennessee	WR
Week 9	Davis Bryson	Kennesaw State	QB	Tyler Hallum	Kennesaw State	DB	Austin Welch	Kennesaw State	K
Week 10	Eric Rivers; Tre Stewart	FIU; Jacksonville State	WR; RB	Geimere Latimer	Jacksonville State	CB	Abraham Montano	New Mexico State	K
Week 11	Skyler Locklear	UTEP	QB	Kory Chapman	UTEP	S	Lucas Carneiro (2)	Western Kentucky	K
Week 12	Quinton Cooley	Liberty	RB	Joseph Carter	Liberty	LB	Buck Buchanan (2)	Louisiana Tech	K
Week 13	Tyler Huff (2)	Jacksonville State	QB	Dylan Early	New Mexico State	S	Austin Welch (2)	Kennesaw State	K
Week 14	Keyone Jenkins (2)	FIU	QB	Bryton Thompson	UTEP	DE	Lucas Carneiro (3)	Western Kentucky	K

== NFL draft ==
The NFL draft will be held at Lambeau Field in Green Bay, Wisconsin. The following list includes all C-USA players in the draft.

=== List of selections ===
Player	Position	School	Draft round	Round pick	Overall pick	Team
Upton Stout	CB	Western Kentucky	3	36	100	San Francisco 49ers
