= 2024 James Madison Dukes football team =

American college football season

2024 James Madison Dukes football

Boca Raton Bowl champion

Boca Raton Bowl, W 27–17 vs. Western Kentucky
- Conference: Sun Belt Conference
- East Division
- Record: 9–4 (4–4 Sun Belt)
- Head coach: Bob Chesney (1st season)
- Offensive coordinator: Dean Kennedy (1st season)
- Offensive scheme: Spread
- Defensive coordinator: Lyle Hemphill (1st season)
- Base defense: 4–3
- Home stadium: Bridgeforth Stadium

2024 Sun Belt Conference football standings
	Conf.			Overall
Team	W		L	W		L
East Division
Marshall xy$	7	–	1	10	–	3
Georgia Southern	6	–	2	8	–	5
James Madison	4	–	4	9	–	4
Old Dominion	4	–	4	5	–	7
Coastal Carolina	3	–	5	6	–	7
Appalachian State	3	–	5	5	–	6
Georgia State	1	–	7	3	–	9
West Division
Louisiana xy	7	–	1	10	–	4
Texas State	5	–	3	8	–	5
Arkansas State	5	–	3	8	–	5
South Alabama	5	–	3	7	–	6
Louisiana–Monroe	3	–	5	5	–	7
Troy	3	–	5	4	–	8
Southern Miss	0	–	8	1	–	11
Championship: Marshall 31, Louisiana 3
$ – Conference champion; x – Division champion/co-champions; y – Championship game participant

The 2024 James Madison Dukes football team represented James Madison University in the Sun Belt Conference's East Division during the 2024 NCAA Division I FBS football season. The Dukes were led by Bob Chesney in his first year as the head coach. The Dukes played their home games at the Bridgeforth Stadium, located in Harrisonburg, Virginia.

== Preseason ==
=== Media poll ===
In the Sun Belt preseason coaches' poll, the Dukes were picked to finish second place in the East division.

Offensive lineman Cole Potts and punter Ryan Hanson were awarded to be in the preseason All-Sun Belt first team offense and special teams, respectively. Offensive lineman Tyshawn Wyatt, defensive lineman Eric O'Neill, and cornerback Chauncey Logan were named to the second team.

== Schedule ==
The football schedule was announced on March 1, 2024.

Date	Time	Opponent	Site	TV	Result	Attendance
August 31	8:00 p.m.	at Charlotte*	Jerry Richardson Stadium; Charlotte, NC	ESPNU	W 30–7	15,614
September 7	6:00 p.m.	Gardner–Webb*	Bridgeforth Stadium; Harrisonburg, VA	ESPN+	W 13–6	24,570
September 21	12:00 p.m.	at North Carolina*	Kenan Memorial Stadium; Chapel Hill, NC	ACCN	W 70–50	50,500
September 28	1:30 p.m.	Ball State*	Bridgeforth Stadium; Harrisonburg, VA	ESPN+	W 63–7	25,786
October 5	7:00 p.m.	at Louisiana–Monroe	Malone Stadium; Monroe, LA	ESPNU	L 19–21	19,976
October 10	7:30 p.m.	Coastal Carolina	Bridgeforth Stadium; Harrisonburg, VA	ESPN2	W 39–7	25,622
October 19	4:00 p.m.	at Georgia Southern	Paulson Stadium; Statesboro, GA	ESPN+	L 14–28	20,153
October 26	3:30 p.m.	Southern Miss^{†}	Bridgeforth Stadium; Harrisonburg, VA	ESPN+	W 32–15	25,399
November 9	3:30 p.m.	Georgia State	Bridgeforth Stadium; Harrisonburg, VA	ESPN+	W 38–7	25,709
November 16	4:00 p.m.	at Old Dominion	S.B. Ballard Stadium; Norfolk, VA (Royal Rivalry)	ESPNU	W 35–32	21,984
November 23	2:30 p.m.	at Appalachian State	Kidd Brewer Stadium; Boone, NC	ESPN+	L 20–34	34,012
November 30	8:00 p.m.	Marshall	Bridgeforth Stadium; Harrisonburg, VA	ESPNU	L 33–35 ^{2OT}	23,341
December 18	5:30 p.m.	vs. Western Kentucky	FAU Stadium; Boca Raton, FL (Boca Raton Bowl)	ESPN	W 27–17	15,808
*Non-conference game; ^{†}Homecoming; Rankings from AP Poll and CFP Rankings released prior to game; All times are in Eastern time

== Personnel ==
=== Transfers ===
Outgoing
Player	Position	Destination
D'Angelo Ponds	CB	Indiana
Rykin Maxwell	WR	Murray State
Solomon Vanhorse	RB	Indiana
Sammy Malignaggi	RB	Campbell
Tyrique Tucker	DL	Indiana
Brent Austin	CB	USF
Elijah Sarratt	WR	Indiana
Tyler Stephens	OL	Indiana
Kaelon Black	RB	Indiana
Nick Kidwell	OL	Indiana
Ty Son Lawton	RB	Indiana
James Carpenter	DL	Indiana
Jailin Walker	LB	Indiana
Aiden Fisher	LB	Indiana
Carter Miller	OL	Louisiana–Monroe
Mikail Kamara	DL	Indiana
Zach Horton	TE	Indiana
Kaden Schickel	LS	Michigan State
Jordan McCloud	QB	Texas State
Aaron Gunn	OL	Duquesne
Collin Caroll	TE	Gardner–Webb
Ibrahim Barry	WR	Sussex County CC
Noah Holmes	LB	East Carolina
Seth Naotala	LB	Old Dominion
Payton Hunter	WR	West Virginia State
Wesley Bostic	OL	Virginia State
Taurus Jones	LB	TBD
Abi Nwabuoku-Okonji	DL	Withdrawn
Chauncey Logan	CB	Withdrawn
Tyshawn Wyatt	OT	Withdrawn

Incoming
Player	Position	Previous School
Khairi Manns	LB	Colorado
Ahmarian Granger	WR	Old Dominion
Rayquan Adkins	CB	Cincinnati
Jobi Malary	RB	Portland State
Chris Fitzgerald	DL	Youngstown State
Jordan Taylor	CB	Tusculum
Cam Ross	WR	UConn
Pat McMurtrie	OT	Holy Cross
Hunter McLain	OL	Virginia Tech
Brionne Penny	WR	San Diego State
Tyler Purdy	RB	Holy Cross
DJ Cotton Jr.	DL	West Virginia
Dylan Morris	QB	Washington
Terry Lockett Jr.	DL	Syracuse
Ja'kai Young	CB	Gardner–Webb
Chris Shearin	CB	UConn
Lloyd Summerall	DE	USF
Raymond Scott	LB	Fresno State
Eric O'Neill	DL	LIU
Logan Kyle	TE	Vanderbilt
George Pettaway	RB	North Carolina
Ayo Adeyi	RB	North Texas
Jesse Ramil	OT	Saint Francis (PA)
AJ Abbasi	DL	West Virginia State
Jacob Dobbs	LB	Holy Cross
Nakai Poole	WR	Mississippi State
Noe Ruelas	K	UConn

=== Roster ===
2024 James Madison Dukes football team roster
Players
Coaches
Offense

Pos.	#	Name	Class
WR	0	Yamir Knight	So
WR	1	Cam Ross	Sr
WR	2	Jayden Mines	So
QB	5	Dylan Morris	Sr
RB	6	George Pettaway	So
RB	7	Ayo Adeyi	Sr
WR	8	Maxwell Moss	So
WR	9	Omarion Dollison	Sr
QB	10	Brett Griffis	So
WR	10	Brionne Penny	Sr
QB	11	Billy Atkins	Jr
QB	12	JC Evans	Fr
WR	13	Troy Lewis	Jr
QB	14	Alonza Barnett III	So
TE	15	Kyi Wright	Sr
WR	16	Desmond Green	Jr
TE	17	Taylor Thompson	Sr
QB	18	Blake Kendall	So
TE	18	Logan Kyle	Jr
WR	19	Taji Hudson	Jr
RB	20	Tyler Purdy	Sr
WR	21	Chris Lofton	Fr
RB	25	Wayne Knight	So
RB	28	Jobi Malary	Sr
RB	29	Ke'Marion Baldwin	Fr
TE	49	Ryder Post	Fr
OL	50	Quincy Jenkins	Sr
OL	52	Tyshawn Wyatt	Sr
OL	53	Hunter McLain	So
OL	55	Riley Robell	Fr
OL	56	JaKobe Campbell	Fr
OL	58	Tanner Morris	Sr
OL	60	Carter Sweazie	So
OL	64	Luke Popma	Sr
OL	66	Cole Potts	Sr
OL	67	Jacob Hohenshelt	Fr
OL	68	Griffin Hart	Fr
OL	69	Breon Brown	Fr
OL	70	Brett Davis	Jr
OL	71	Deacon Rawls	Fr
OL	72	Josh Toner	Jr
OL	73	Evan Bushong	Fr
OL	75	Kyle Lenhart	Fr
OL	76	Pat McMurtrie	Sr
OL	77	Jesse Ramil	Jr
OL	78	Cameron Jones	Fr
OL	79	Joseph Simmons	So
TE	81	Gabriel Hollingsworth	Sr
WR	83	Erick Harris	So
TE	85	Jordan Funk	Sr
WR	88	Dylan Williams	Fr
TE	89	Josh Phifer	Fr

Defense

Pos.	#	Name	Class
LB	0	Taurus Jones	Sr
LB	1	Raymond Scott	GS
CB	2	Chauncey Logan	Jr
CB	3	Terrence Spence	Sr
LB	5	Trent Hendrick	Jr
S	6	Ray Williams	Sr
S	7	Jacob Thomas	Jr
DL	8	Amar Thomas	So
DL	9	Lloyd Summerall III	Sr
S	10	Chris Shearin	Sr
DL	11	Khairi Manns	Sr
S	12	Kye Holmes	Jr
CB	13	Jordan Taylor	Sr
NIC	14	KJ Flowe	Fr
DL	15	Immanuel Bush	Jr
LB	17	Gannon Weathersby	So
S	18	Evan Spivey	Fr
NIC	19	Ja'Kai Young	Sr
S	21	Jamari Somerville	Fr
S	22	Chase Regan	Fr
CB	23	Trevell Mullen	So
S	24	Phillip Harris	Fr
S	26	Jahquil Batts	Jr
LB	27	Jacob Dobbs	Sr
CB	28	Tyjai Hopper	Fr
S	29	Tyler Brown	Fr
CB	30	Justin Eaglin	So
CB	31	Antoine Booth	Jr
NIC	32	DJ Barksdale	So
DL	33	Brian Snow	Sr
NIC	34	Isaiah West	Fr
S	35	Joshua Prince	Fr
CB	36	Milt Ferguson	Fr
CB	37	Jamaree Seldon	So
S	38	Stephen Hollander	So
NIC	39	Kalin Jean	Jr
LB	40	Jackson Snyder	Fr
S	41	George Lovelace	Fr
DL	42	Carter Banks	So
LB	43	Matthew Channell	So
DL	44	DJ Cotton Jr.	Fr
LB	45	Trashon Dye	Fr
LB	46	Immanuel Ezeogu	Fr
S	47	Kevin Kabasele	Fr
DL	48	Greyson Cadd	So
LB	51	Danny Reagan	Fr
LB	52	Jackson Hamil	Fr
LB	54	Brandon Fique	Jr
DL	55	Treyvon Adams	Fr
DL	57	Cole Purdy	Fr
DL	59	Micah Pennix	Fr
DL	62	Ibraheem Ramadan	Fr
DL	90	Terry Lockett Jr.	Jr
DL	91	Marcellus Nash	Fr
DL	92	Darold DeNgohe	Fr
DL	93	Mychal McMullin	Fr
DL	94	Spencer Toth	So
DL	95	Sahir West	Fr
DL	97	Chris Fitzgerald	Sr
DL	98	Samson Ogunade	Fr
DL	99	Eric O'Neill	Jr

Special teams

Pos.	#	Name	Class
K	16	Noe Ruelas	Jr
LS	40	Logan Ketcham	Jr
LS	43	Jack Mowrey	Fr
P	48	Ryan Hanson	Sr
K	93	Max Lipinski	Fr
K	95	Cristiano Rosa	So
P	96	Andrew VanSlyke	Fr

Head coach

- Bob Chesney

Coordinators/assistant coaches

- Dean Kennedy (Offensive coordinator / Quarterbacks)
- Lyle Hemphill (Defensive coordinator / Nickels)
- Drew Canan (Special teams coordinator / Tight ends)
- Chris Smith (Offensive line / run game coordinator)
- Anthony DiMichele (Safeties / recruiting coordinator)
- Eddie Whitley Jr. (Cornerbacks)
- Justin Harper (Wide receivers)
- Zach Sparber (Linebackers)
- Sam Daniels (Defensive line)
- David Sims Jr. (Running backs)
- Chris Zarkoskie (Assistant offensive line)
- Kyle Barnes (Nickels)
- Julio Ayamel (Graduate assistant)

Legend

- (C) Team captain
- (S) Suspended
- (I) Ineligible
- Injured
- Redshirt

Roster
Last update: September 27, 2024

== Game summaries ==
=== at Charlotte ===
James Madison Dukes at Charlotte 49ers – Game summary

Quarter	1	2	3	4	Total
Dukes	3	6	7	14	30
49ers	0	7	0	0	7

at Jerry Richardson Stadium, Charlotte, North Carolina

- Date: August 31
- Game time: 8:00 p.m. EDT
- Game weather: Cloudy • Temperature: 83 °F (28 °C) • Wind: 0 miles per hour (0 km/h)
- Game attendance: 15,614
- Referee: Charles Lamertina
- TV announcers (ESPNU): Justin Kutcher (play-by-play) and Charles Arbuckle (analyst)

Game information

First quarter

- (0:41) JMU – Noe Ruelas 43 yard field goal (Drive: 4 plays, 0 yards, 0:52; James Madison 3–0)

Second quarter

- (8:09) CHAR – Isaiah Myers 26 yard pass from Max Brown, Kyle Cunanan kick (Drive: 6 plays, 64 yards, 3:05; Charlotte 7–3)
- (0:49) JMU – George Pettaway 33 yard pass from Alonza Barnett III, kick failed (Drive: 1 play, 33 yards, 0:05; James Madison 9–7)

Third quarter

- (14:16) JMU – Omarion Dollison 73 yard pass from Alonza Barnett III, Noe Ruelas kick (Drive: 2 plays, 75 yards, 0:44; James Madison 16–7)

Fourth quarter

- (14:15) JMU – Ayo Adeyi 8 yard run, Noe Ruelas kick (Drive: 7 plays, 63 yards, 3:12; James Madison 23–7)
- (1:10) JMU – George Pettaway 1 yard run, Noe Ruelas kick (Drive: 7 plays, 52 yards, 3:25; James Madison 30–7)

Statistics	JMU	CLT
First downs	16	17
Total yards	417	324
Rushing yards	198	131
Passing yards	219	193
Turnovers	2	3
Time of possession	28:18	31:42

Team	Category	Player	Statistics
James Madison	Passing	Alonza Barnett III	10/18, 219 yards, 2 TD, INT
James Madison	Rushing	Alonza Barnett III	9 rushes, 89 yards
James Madison	Receiving	Omarion Dollison	2 receptions, 80 yards, TD
Charlotte	Passing	Max Brown	22/45, 193 yards, TD, 2 INT
Charlotte	Rushing	Terron Kellman	9 rushes, 76 yards
Charlotte	Receiving	Sean Brown	6 receptions, 70 yards

=== Gardner–Webb ===
Gardner–Webb Runnin' Bulldogs at James Madison Dukes – Game summary

Quarter	1	2	3	4	Total
Runnin' Bulldogs	0	3	3	0	6
Dukes	0	0	10	3	13

at Bridgeforth Stadium, Harrisonburg, Virginia

- Date: September 7
- Game time: 6:00 p.m. EDT
- Game weather: Sunny, 70 °F (21 °C)
- Game attendance: 24,570
- Referee: Jeff Page
- TV announcers (FloSports): Curt Dudley (play-by-play), Brian Barlow (analyst) and David Hulvey (sideline)

Game information

First quarter

No scoring

Second quarter

- (8:51) GWEB – Jay Billingsley 43 yard field goal (Drive: 12 plays, 48 yards, 6:04; Gardner-Webb 3–0)

Third quarter

- (10:30) JMU – Tyler Purdy 1 yard run, Noe Ruelas kick (Drive: 10 plays, 58 yards, 3:36; JMU 7–3)
- (7:14) JMU – Noe Ruelas 48 yard field goal (Drive: 4 plays, 2 yards, 1:48; JMU 10–3)
- (1:35) GWEB – Jay Billingsley 30 yard field goal (Drive: 11 plays, 62 yards, 5:39; JMU 10–6)

Fourth quarter

- (7:14) JMU – Noe Ruelas 26 yard field goal (Drive: 12 plays, 66 yards, 5:21; JMU 13–6)

Statistics	GWEB	JMU
First downs	16	15
Total yards	269	285
Rushing yards	109	150
Passing yards	160	135
Turnovers	2	0
Time of possession	33:58	26:02

Team	Category	Player	Statistics
Gardner–Webb	Passing	Tyler Ridell	17/30, 160 yards, 2 INT
Gardner–Webb	Rushing	Edward Saydee	22 rushes, 87 yards
Gardner–Webb	Receiving	Camden Overton	5 receptions, 65 yards
James Madison	Passing	Alonza Barnett III	14/22, 135 yards
James Madison	Rushing	George Pettaway	10 rushes, 84 yards
James Madison	Receiving	George Pettaway	4 receptions, 32 yards

=== at North Carolina ===
James Madison Dukes at North Carolina Tar Heels – Game summary

Quarter	1	2	3	4	Total
Dukes	25	28	7	10	70
Tar Heels	14	7	17	12	50

at Kenan Memorial Stadium, Chapel Hill, North Carolina

- Date: September 21
- Game time: 12:00 p.m. EDT
- Game weather: Sunny, 80 °F (27 °C)
- Game attendance: 50,500
- Referee: Riley Johnson
- TV announcers (ACCN): Jorge Sedano (play-by-play), Orlando Franklin (analyst) and Morgan Uber (sideline)

Game information
First quarter
- JMU – Noe Ruelas 50-yard field goal, 13:36. Dukes 3–0. Drive: 5 plays, 44 yards, 1:24.
- JMU – Jayden Mines 14-yard blocked punt return (Noe Ruelas pass to Jack Mowrey), 10:36. Dukes 11–0.
- UNC – John Copenhaver 35-yard pass from Jacolby Criswell (Noah Burnette kick), 8:12. Dukes 11–7. Drive: 6 plays, 77 yards, 2:19.
- UNC – Omarion Hampton 28-yard run (Noah Burnette kick), 4:08. Tar Heels 14–11. Drive: 5 plays, 80 yards, 1:58.
- JMU – Omarion Dollison 69-yard pass from Alonza Barnett III (Noe Ruelas kick), 3:36. Dukes 18–14. Drive: 2 plays, 75 yards, 0:32.
- JMU – Alonza Barnett III 3-yard run (Noe Ruelas kick), 1:23. Dukes 25–14. Drive: 5 plays, 61 yards, 2:11.

Second quarter

- UNC – Bryson Nesbit 34-yard pass from Jacolby Criswell (Noah Burnette kick), 14:33. Dukes 25–21. Drive: 6 plays, 75 yards, 1:50.
- JMU – Cam Ross 6-yard pass from Alonza Barnett III (Noe Ruelas kick), 10:20. Dukes 32–21. Drive: 8 plays, 75 yards, 4:13.
- JMU – Taylor Thompson 13-yard pass from Alonza Barnett III (Noe Ruelas kick), 8:45. Dukes 39–21. Drive: 2 plays, 69 yards, 0:29.
- JMU – Alonza Barnett III 27-yard run (Noe Ruelas kick), 7:14. Dukes 46–21. Drive: 1 play, 27 yards, 0:10.
- JMU – Terrence Spence 33-yard interception return (Noe Ruelas kick), 0:56. Dukes 53–21.

Third quarter

- UNC – Noah Burnette 42-yard field goal, 11:35. Dukes 53–24. Drive: 9 plays, 50 yards, 3:25.
- JMU – Dylan Williams 7-yard pass from Alonza Barnett III (Noe Ruelas kick), 9:16. Dukes 60–24. Drive: 6 plays, 75 yards, 2:19.
- UNC – Omarion Hampton 15-yard run (Jacolby Criswell pass to Bryson Nesbit), 7:11. Dukes 60–32. Drive: 6 plays, 79 yards, 2:01.
- UNC – Davion Gause 34-yard blocked punt return (pass failed), 3:08. Dukes 60–38.

Fourth quarter

- JMU – Noe Ruelas 44-yard field goal, 13:28. Dukes 63–38. Drive: 10 plays, 50 yards, 4:40.
- UNC – Omarion Hampton 2-yard run (pass failed), 11:00. Dukes 63–44. Drive: 7 plays, 78 yards, 2:19.
- JMU – Logan Kyle 11-yard pass from Alonza Barnett III (Noe Ruelas kick), 4:26. Dukes 70–44. Drive: 7 plays, 33 yards, 4:53.
- UNC – Jordan Shipps 5-yard pass from Jacolby Criswell (pass failed), 1:18. Dukes 70–50. Drive: 12 plays, 80 yards, 3:01.

Statistics	JMU	UNC
First downs	25	30
Total yards	611	616
Rushing yards	223	141
Passing yards	388	475
Turnovers	1	5
Time of possession	34:04	25:56

Team	Category	Player	Statistics
James Madison	Passing	Alonza Barnett III	22/34, 388 yards, 5 TD
James Madison	Rushing	Alonza Barnett III	13 rushes, 99 yards, 2 TD
James Madison	Receiving	Omarion Dollison	3 receptions, 125 yards, TD
North Carolina	Passing	Jacolby Criswell	28/48, 475 yards, 3 TD, 2 INT
North Carolina	Rushing	Omarion Hampton	13 rushes, 139 yards, 3 TD
North Carolina	Receiving	Kobe Paysour	4 receptions, 93 yards

=== Ball State ===
Ball State Cardinals at James Madison Dukes – Game summary

Quarter	1	2	3	4	Total
Cardinals	7	0	0	0	7
Dukes	22	7	20	14	63

at Bridgeforth Stadium, Harrisonburg, Virginia

- Date: September 28
- Game time: 1:30 p.m. EDT
- Game weather: Sunny • Temperature: 75 °F (24 °C) • Wind: S at 7 miles per hour (11 km/h)
- Game attendance: 25,786
- Referee: Jeremy Parker
- TV announcers (ESPN+): Curt Dudley (play-by-play), Brian Barlow (analyst) and David Hulvey (sideline)

Game information

First quarter

- (10:15) JMU – Yamir Knight 12-yard pass from Alonza Barnett III, Noe Ruelas kick (Drive: 11 plays, 66 yards, 4:37; James Madison 7–0)
- (6:54) JMU – George Pettaway 24-yard run, Taylor Thompson rush (Drive: 5 plays, 35 yards, 1:24; James Madison 15–0)
- (3:34) BALL – Tanner Koziol 15-yard pass from Kadin Semonza, Carson Holmer kick (Drive: 7 plays, 75 yards, 3:20; James Madison 15–7)
- (1:51) JMU – Omarion Dollison 5-yard pass from Alonza Barnett III, Noe Ruelas kick (Drive: 8 plays, 75 yards, 1:43; James Madison 22–7)

Second quarter

- (4:20) JMU – Yamir Knight 10-yard pass from Alonza Barnett III, Noe Ruelas kick (Drive: 9 plays, 59 yards, 4:32; James Madison 29–7)

Third quarter

- (13:58) JMU – Eric O'Neill 27-yard interception (James Madison 35–7)
- (9:45) JMU – Cam Ross 26-yard pass from Alonza Barnett III, Noe Ruelas kick (Drive: 4 plays, 55 yards, 1:19; James Madison 42–7)
- (7:19) JMU – Alonza Barnett III 18-yard run, Noe Ruelas kick (Drive: 2 plays, 33 yards, 0:42; James Madison 49–7)

Fourth quarter

- (10:55) JMU – Taylor Thompson 22-yard pass from Alonza Barnett III, Noe Ruelas kick (Drive: 9 plays, 94 yards, 4:13; James Madison 56–7)
- (2:40) JMU – Jobi Malary 32-yard run, Max Lipinski kick (Drive: 10 plays, 59 yards, 6:41; James Madison 63–7)

Statistics	BALL	JMU
First downs	19	29
Total yards	250	522
Rushing yards	77	236
Passing yards	173	286
Turnovers	3	0
Time of possession	33:41	26:19

Team	Category	Player	Statistics
Ball State	Passing	Kadin Semonza	22/35, 168 yards, TD, 3 INT
Ball State	Rushing	Braedon Sloan	14 carries, 72 yards
Ball State	Receiving	Tanner Koziol	9 receptions, 78 yards, TD
James Madison	Passing	Alonza Barnett III	20/28, 280 yards, 5 TD
James Madison	Rushing	Wayne Knight	6 carries, 63 yards
James Madison	Receiving	Taylor Thompson	5 receptions, 91 yards, TD

=== at Louisiana–Monroe ===
James Madison Dukes at Louisiana–Monroe Warhawks – Game summary

Quarter	1	2	3	4	Total
Dukes	10	3	0	6	19
Warhawks	0	14	0	7	21

at Malone Stadium • Monroe, Louisiana

- Date: October 5, 2024
- Game time: 7:00 p.m. EDT
- Game weather: Sunny • Temperature: 91 °F (33 °C) • Wind: NE at 8 miles per hour (13 km/h)
- Game attendance: 19,976
- Referee: Marshall Lewis
- TV announcers (ESPNU): Jay Alter (play-by-play) and Rocky Boiman (analyst)

Game information

First quarter

- (12:42) JMU – Alonza Barnett III 27-yard run, Noe Ruelas kick (Drive: 6 plays, 67 yards, 2:12; James Madison 7–0)
- (8:56) JMU – Noe Ruelas 48-yard field goal (Drive: 4 plays, -3 yards, 1:23; James Madison 10–0)

Second quarter

- (5:45) ULM – Ahmad Hardy 38-yard run, Max Larson kick (Drive: 6 plays, 50 yards, 3:04; James Madison 10–7)
- (1:31) ULM – Daniel Knudsen 82-yard fumble recovery, Max Larson kick (Louisiana–Monroe 14–10)
- (0:00) JMU – Noe Ruelas 39-yard field goal (Drive: 10 plays, 63 yards, 1:23; Louisiana–Monroe 14–13)

Third quarter

No scoring plays

Fourth quarter

- (10:30) ULM – Jake Godfrey 12-yard pass from Aidan Armenta, Max Larson kick (Drive: 11 plays, 63 yards, 7:13; Louisiana–Monroe 21–13)
- (4:04) JMU – Tyler Purdy 1-yard run (Drive: 15 plays, 75 yards, 6:26; Louisiana–Monroe 21–19)

Statistics	JMU	ULM
First downs	24	15
Total yards	399	257
Rushing yards	148	110
Passing yards	251	147
Passing: Comp–Att–Int	20–47–0	17–30–1
Time of possession	28:56	31:04

Team	Category	Player	Statistics
James Madison	Passing	Alonza Barnett III	20/47, 251 yards
James Madison	Rushing	George Pettaway	13 carries, 62 yards
James Madison	Receiving	Yamir Knight	4 receptions, 67 yards
Louisiana–Monroe	Passing	Aidan Armenta	17/30, 147 yards, TD, INT
Louisiana–Monroe	Rushing	Ahmad Hardy	14 carries, 82 yards, TD
Louisiana–Monroe	Receiving	Jake Godfrey	7 receptions, 60 yards, TD

=== Coastal Carolina ===
Coastal Carolina Chanticleers at James Madison Dukes – Game summary

Quarter	1	2	3	4	Total
Chanticleers	7	0	0	0	7
Dukes	7	22	7	3	39

at Bridgeforth Stadium, Harrisonburg, Virginia

- Date: October 10
- Game time: 7:30 p.m. EDT
- Game weather: Sunny • Temperature: 65 °F (18 °C) • Wind: S at 2 miles per hour (3.2 km/h)
- Game attendance: 25,622
- Referee: Ted Pitts
- TV announcers (ESPN2): Matt Barrie (play-by-play), Dan Mullen (analyst) and Harry Lyles Jr. (sideline)

Game information

First quarter

- (6:51) JMU – George Pettaway 9-yard pass from Alonza Barnett III, Max Lipinski kick (Drive: 11 plays, 67 yards, 5:51; James Madison 7–0)
- (4:30) CCU – Jameson Tucker 40-yard pass from Ethan Vasko, Kade Hensley kick (Drive: 5 plays, 73 yards, 2:15; Tied 7–7)

Second quarter

- (13:01) JMU – Taylor Thompson 25-yard pass from Alonza Barnett III, Josh Phifer pass (Drive: 4 plays, 77 yards, 1:20; James Madison 15–7)
- (11:51) JMU – Lloyd Summerall III 35-yard interception, Max Lipinski kick (James Madison 22–7)
- (6:47) JMU – Alonza Barnett III 5-yard run, Max Lipinski kick (Drive: 7 plays, 54 yards, 3:32; James Madison 29–7)

Third quarter

- (10:41) JMU – Dylan Williams 3-yard pass from Alonza Barnett III, Max Lipinski kick (Drive: 8 plays, 59 yards, 3:06; James Madison 36–7)

Fourth quarter

- (5:14) JMU – Max Lipinski 35-yard field goal (Drive: 9 plays, 41 yards, 6:31; James Madison 39–7)

Statistics	CCU	JMU
First downs	8	20
Total yards	181	421
Rushing yards	79	222
Passing yards	102	199
Turnovers	2	1
Time of possession	21:06	38:54

Team	Category	Player	Statistics
Coastal Carolina	Passing	Ethan Vasko	5/18, 84 yards, TD, 2 INT
Coastal Carolina	Rushing	Braydon Bennett	12 carries, 45 yards
Coastal Carolina	Receiving	Jameson Tucker	2 receptions, 44 yards, TD
James Madison	Passing	Alonza Barnett III	16/28, 199 yards, 3 TD
James Madison	Rushing	George Pettaway	13 carries, 89 yards
James Madison	Receiving	Taylor Thompson	2 receptions, 58 yards, TD

=== at Georgia Southern ===
James Madison Dukes at Georgia Southern Eagles – Game summary

Quarter	1	2	3	4	Total
Dukes	0	0	7	7	14
Eagles	7	14	7	0	28

at Paulson Stadium • Statesboro, Georgia

- Date: October 19, 2024
- Game time: 4:00 p.m. EDT
- Game weather: Sunny • Temperature: 73 °F (23 °C) • Wind: SW 10 miles per hour (16 km/h)
- Game attendance: 20,153
- Referee: Scott Broadway
- TV announcers (ESPN+): Danny Waugh (play-by-play), Jayson Foster (analyst) and Whitney Haworth (sideline)

Game information

First quarter

- (4:23) GASO – David Mbadinga 29-yard run, Gavin Stewart kick (Drive: 6 plays, 78 yards, 2:12; Georgia Southern 7–0)

Second quarter

- (3:48) GASO – Derwin Burgess Jr. 5-yard pass from JC French, Gavin Stewart kick (Drive: 18 plays, 96 yards, 9:14; Georgia Southern 14–0)
- (1:43) GASO – Tyler Fromm 15-yard pass from JC French, Gavin Stewart kick (Drive: 5 plays, 58 yards, 0:42; Georgia Southern 21–0)

Third quarter

- (8:20) JMU – DJ Barksdale 11-yard interception, Max Lipinski kick (Georgia Southern 21–7)
- (4:43) GASO – Elijah Watson 2-yard pass from JC French, Gavin Stewart kick (Drive: 7 plays, 75 yards, 3:37; Georgia Southern 28–7)

Fourth quarter

- (14:32) JMU – Omarion Dollison 35-yard pass from Alonza Barnett III, Max Lipinski kick (Drive: 13 plays, 82 yards, 5:06; Georgia Southern 28–14)

Statistics	JMU	GASO
First downs	16	24
Total yards	253	405
Rushing yards	67	190
Passing yards	186	215
Passing: Comp–Att–Int	22–41–0	24–33–3
Time of possession	26:01	33:59

Team	Category	Player	Statistics
James Madison	Passing	Alonza Barnett III	22/41, 186 yards, TD
James Madison	Rushing	George Pettaway	13 carries, 63 yards
James Madison	Receiving	Omarion Dollison	3 receptions, 51 yards, TD
Georgia Southern	Passing	JC French	24/33, 215 yards, 3 TD, 3 INT
Georgia Southern	Rushing	Jalen White	23 carries, 134 yards
Georgia Southern	Receiving	Derwin Burgess Jr.	5 receptions, 52 yards, TD

=== Southern Miss ===
Southern Miss Golden Eagles at James Madison Dukes – Game summary

Quarter	1	2	3	4	Total
Golden Eagles	3	6	6	0	15
Dukes	0	17	8	7	32

at Bridgeforth Stadium, Harrisonburg, Virginia

- Date: October 26, 2024
- Game time: 3:30 p.m. EDT
- Game weather: Sunny
- Game attendance: 25,399
- Referee: Jeremy Parker
- TV announcers (ESPN+): Curt Dudley (play-by-play), Delvin Joyce (analyst) and David Hulvey (sideline)

Game information

First quarter

- (10:29) USM – Connor Gibbs 44-yard field goal (Drive: 5 plays, 18 yards, 1:12; Southern Miss 3–0)

Second quarter

- (13:57) JMU – Cristiano Rosa 40-yard field goal (Drive: 6 plays, 50 yards, 2:06; Tied 3–3)
- (5:49) JMU – George Pettaway 4-yard run, Cristiano Rosa kick (Drive: 5 plays, 67 yards, 1:55; James Madison 10–3)
- (4:50) JMU – Taylor Thompson 10-yard pass from Alonza Barnett III, Cristiano Rosa kick (Drive: 1 play, 10 yards, 0:06; James Madison 17–3)
- (1:55) USM – Connor Gibbs 54-yard field goal (Drive: 7 plays, 38 yards, 2:55; James Madison 17–6)
- (0:00) USM – Connor Gibbs 46-yard field goal (Drive: 8 plays, 37 yards, 1:14; James Madison 17–9)

Third quarter

- (14:47) JMU – Cam Ross 94-yard kickoff return (James Madison 23–9)
- (10:47) USM – Kenyon Clay 15-yard run (Drive: 9 plays, 75 yards, 4:00; James Madison 23–15)
- (10:47) JMU – Chris Shearin 0-yard PAT return (James Madison 25–15)

Fourth quarter

- (12:05) JMU – Cam Ross 7-yard pass from Alonza Barnett III, Cristiano Rosa kick (Drive: 12 plays, 94 yards, 5:22; James Madison 32–15)

Statistics	USM	JMU
First downs	19	18
Total yards	319	357
Rushing yards	141	199
Passing yards	178	158
Turnovers	2	1
Time of possession	30:16	29:44

Team	Category	Player	Statistics
Southern Miss	Passing	Ethan Crawford	11/34, 178 yards, INT
Southern Miss	Rushing	Kenyon Clay	8 carries, 69 yards, TD
Southern Miss	Receiving	Dannis Jackson	5 receptions, 94 yards
James Madison	Passing	Alonza Barnett III	15/25, 135 yards, 2 TD, INT
James Madison	Rushing	George Pettaway	16 carries, 119 yards, TD
James Madison	Receiving	Wayne Knight	2 receptions, 41 yards

=== Georgia State ===
Georgia State Panthers at James Madison Dukes – Game summary

Quarter	1	2	3	4	Total
Panthers	0	7	0	0	7
Dukes	14	14	10	0	38

at Bridgeforth Stadium, Harrisonburg, Virginia

- Date: November 9, 2024
- Game time: 3:30 p.m. EDT
- Game weather: Sunny
- Game attendance: 25,709
- Referee: Steven Robinson
- TV announcers (ESPN+): Curt Dudley (play-by-play), Delvin Joyce (analyst) and David Hulvey (sideline)

Game information

First quarter

- (8:21) JMU – George Pettaway 1-yard run, Noe Ruelas kick (Drive: 9 plays, 68 yards, 4:27; James Madison 7–0)
- (3:19) JMU – Omarion Dollison 52-yard pass from Alonza Barnett III, Noe Ruelas kick (Drive: 1 play, 52 yards, 0:09; James Madison 14–0)

Second quarter

- (14:55) GAST – Ted Hurst 9-yard pass from Zach Gibson, Liam Rickman kick (Drive: 7 plays, 75 yards, 3:24; James Madison 14–7)
- (9:18) JMU – Taylor Thompson 12-yard pass from Alonza Barnett III, Noe Ruelas kick (Drive: 11 plays, 75 yards, 5:37; James Madison 21–7)
- (0:49) JMU – Wayne Knight 7-yard run, Noe Ruelas kick (Drive: 7 plays, 89 yards, 0:51; James Madison 28–7)

Third quarter

- (6:21) JMU – Wayne Knight 18-yard pass from Alonza Barnett III, Noe Ruelas kick (Drive: 6 plays, 54 yards, 2:33; James Madison 35–7)
- (1:24) JMU – Noe Ruelas 38-yard field goal (Drive: 4 plays, 3 yards, 2:16; James Madison 38–7)

Fourth quarter

No scoring plays

Statistics	GAST	JMU
First downs	16	21
Total yards	259	452
Rushing yards	46	211
Passing yards	213	241
Turnovers	1	0
Time of possession	28:54	31:06

Team	Category	Player	Statistics
Georgia State	Passing	Zach Gibson	24/37, 213 yards, TD
Georgia State	Rushing	Freddie Brock	9 carries, 24 yards
Georgia State	Receiving	Petey Tucker	5 receptions, 54 yards
James Madison	Passing	Alonza Barnett III	20/30, 241 yards, 3 TD
James Madison	Rushing	George Pettaway	13 carries, 95 yards, TD
James Madison	Receiving	Yamir Knight	4 receptions, 65 yards

=== at Old Dominion (Royal Rivalry) ===
James Madison Dukes vs Old Dominion Monarchs – Game summary

Quarter	1	2	3	4	Total
Dukes	7	14	7	7	35
Monarchs	7	17	0	8	32

at S.B. Ballard Stadium • Norfolk, Virginia

- Date: November 16, 2024
- Game time: 4:00 p.m. EDT
- Game weather: Cloudy • Temperature: 60 °F (16 °C) • Wind: NW 13 miles per hour (21 km/h)
- Game attendance: 21,984
- Referee: Scott Broadway
- TV announcers (ESPNU): Courtney Lyle (play-by-play) and Rene Ingoglia (analyst)

Game information

First quarter

- (10:49) JMU – Wayne Knight 2-yard run, Noe Ruelas kick (Drive: 8 plays, 70 yards, 4:05; James Madison 7–0)
- (7:10) ODU – Colton Joseph 15-yard run, Ethan Sanchez kick (Drive: 7 plays, 72 yards, 3:33; Tied 7–7)

Second quarter

- (14:19) JMU – Noe Ruelas 39-yard field goal (Drive: 14 plays, 48 yards, 7:44; James Madison 10–7)
- (12:21) JMU – Alonza Barnett III 50-yard run, Gabriel Hollingsworth rush (Drive: 1 play, 50 yards, 0:10; James Madison 18–7)
- (9:22) ODU – Aaron Young 3-yard run, Ethan Sanchez kick (Drive: 1 play, 3 yards, 0:04; James Madison 18–14)
- (3:52) JMU – Noe Ruelas 33-yard field goal (Drive: 5 plays, 15 yards, 1:45; James Madison 21–14)
- (2:13) ODU – Colton Joseph 10-yard run, Ethan Sanchez kick (Drive: 4 plays, 75 yards, 1:39; Tied 21–21)
- (0:00) ODU – Ethan Sanchez 23-yard field goal (Drive: 6 plays, 43 yards, 1:42; Old Dominion 24–21)

Third quarter

- (2:38) JMU – Yamir Knight 68-yard pass from Alonza Barnett III, Noe Ruelas kick (Drive: 4 plays, 91 yards, 1:14; James Madison 28–24)

Fourth quarter

- (2:30) JMU – Alonza Barnett III 8-yard run, Noe Ruelas kick (Drive: 12 plays, 77 yards, 5:22; James Madison 35–24)
- (0:58) ODU – Colton Joseph 3-yard run, Pat Conroy pass (Drive: 9 plays, 75 yards, 1:32; James Madison 35–32)

Statistics	JMU	ODU
First downs	23	15
Total yards	425	363
Rushing yards	233	174
Passing yards	192	189
Turnovers	0	1
Time of possession	37:52	22:08

Team	Category	Player	Statistics
James Madison	Passing	Alonza Barnett III	18/26, 192 yards, TD
James Madison	Rushing	George Pettaway	19 carries, 82 yards
James Madison	Receiving	Yamir Knight	8 receptions, 121 yards, TD
Old Dominion	Passing	Colton Joseph	9/21, 189 yards, INT
Old Dominion	Rushing	Aaron Young	17 carries, 116 yards, TD
Old Dominion	Receiving	Diante Vines	4 receptions, 89 yards

=== at Appalachian State ===
James Madison Dukes vs Appalachian State Mountaineers – Game summary

Quarter	1	2	3	4	Total
Dukes	7	10	3	0	20
Mountaineers	0	24	7	3	34

at Kidd Brewer Stadium • Boone, North Carolina

- Date: November 23, 2024
- Game time: 2:30 p.m. EDT
- Game weather: Snow • Temperature: 40 °F (4 °C) • Wind: NW 27 miles per hour (43 km/h)
- Game attendance: 34,012
- Referee: Trennis Livingston
- TV announcers (ESPN+): David Jackson (play-by-play) and Avery Hall (analyst)

Game information

First quarter

- (11:03) JMU – Yamir Knight 6-yard pass from Alonza Barnett III, Noe Ruelas kick (Drive: 8 plays, 75 yards, 3:57; James Madison 7–0)

Second quarter

- (14:08) JMU – Josh Phifer 37-yard pass from Alonza Barnett III, Noe Ruelas kick (Drive: 4 plays, 58 yards, 1:45; James Madison 14–0)
- (12:19) APP – Michael Hughes 23-yard field goal (Drive: 6 plays, 70 yards, 1:49; James Madison 14–3)
- (7:33) APP – Eli Wilson 4-yard pass from Joey Aguilar, Michael Hughes kick (Drive: 6 plays, 50 yards, 2:14; James Madison 14–10)
- (2:49) JMU – Noe Ruelas 46-yard field goal (Drive: 11 plays, 47 yards, 4:44; James Madison 17–10)
- (1:23) APP – Makai Jackson 64-yard pass from Joey Aguilar, Michael Hughes kick (Drive: 5 plays, 75 yards, 1:26; Tied 17–17)
- (0:40) APP – Michael Hetzel 9-yard punt return, Michael Hughes kick (Appalachian State 24–17)

Third quarter

- (7:56) JMU – Noe Ruelas 52-yard field goal (Drive: 7 plays, 24 yards, 3:04; Appalachian State 24–20)
- (1:13) APP – Ahmani Marshall 1-yard run, Michael Hughes kick (Drive: 10 plays, 76 yards, 3:54; Appalachian State 31–20)

Fourth quarter

- (10:02) APP – Michael Hughes 41-yard field goal (Drive: 4 plays, 7 yards, 0:37; Appalachian State 34–20)

Statistics	JMU	APP
First downs	22	17
Total yards	400	361
Rushing yards	168	145
Passing yards	232	216
Turnovers	2	0
Time of possession	34:05	25:55

Team	Category	Player	Statistics
James Madison	Passing	Alonza Barnett III	21/36, 232 yards, 2 TD, INT
James Madison	Rushing	George Pettaway	12 carries, 82 yards
James Madison	Receiving	Yamir Knight	5 receptions, 60 yards, TD
Appalachian State	Passing	Joey Aguilar	12/23, 216 yards, 2 TD
Appalachian State	Rushing	Ahmani Marshall	24 carries, 108 yards, TD
Appalachian State	Receiving	Makai Jackson	5 receptions, 162 yards, TD

=== Marshall ===
Marshall Thundering Herd at James Madison Dukes – Game summary

Quarter	1	2	3	4	OT	2OT	Total
Thundering Herd	0	0	17	7	3	8	35
Dukes	14	3	0	7	3	6	33

at Bridgeforth Stadium • Harrisonburg, Virginia

- Date: November 30, 2024
- Game time: 8:00 p.m. EDT
- Game weather: Cloudy • Temperature: 26 °F (−3 °C) • Wind: SW 2 miles per hour (3.2 km/h)
- Game attendance: 23,341
- Referee: Ted Pitts
- TV announcers (ESPNU): Lowell Galindo (play-by-play) and Fozzy Whittaker (analyst)

Game information

First quarter

- (11:43) JMU – George Pettaway 5 yard run, Noe Ruelas kick (Drive: 7 plays, 75 yards, 3:17; James Madison 7–0)
- (4:17) JMU – Omarion Dollison 9 yard pass from Alonza Barnett III, Noe Ruelas kick (Drive: 11 plays, 90 yards, 6:04; James Madison 14–0)

Second quarter

- (8:27) JMU – Noe Ruelas 23 yard field goal (Drive: 10 plays, 83 yards, 8:32; James Madison 17–0)

Third quarter

- (9:43) MRSH – Rece Verhoff 42 yard field goal (Drive: 12 plays, 48 yards, 5:09; James Madison 17–3)
- (2:18) MRSH – Toby Payne 16 yard pass from Braylon Braxton, Rece Verhoff kick (Drive: 5 plays, 45 yards, 1:37; James Madison 17–10)
- (2:11) MRSH – Jadarius Green-McKnight 28 yard interception return, Rece Verhoff kick (Tied 17–17)

Fourth quarter

- (11:09) JMU – Jobi Malary 7 yard run, Noe Ruelas kick (Drive: 10 plays, 65 yards, 6:02; James Madison 24–17)
- (5:04) MRSH – Barylon Braxton 1 yard run, Rece Verhoff kick (Drive: 12 plays, 72 yards, 6:05; Tied 24–24)

First overtime

- MRSH – Rece Verhoff 49 yard field goal (Drive: 4 plays, –6 yards; Marshall 27–24)
- JMU – Noe Ruelas 23 yard field goal (Drive: 4 plays, 5 yards; Tied 27–27)

Second overtime

- JMU – Wayne Knight 9 yard pass from Alonza Barnett III, Alonza Barnett III pass failed (Drive: 6 plays, 25 yards; James Madison 33–27)
- MRSH – Tychaun Chapman 10 yard run, Braylon Braxton pass to Charles Montgomery (Drive: 4 plays, 25 yards; Marshall 35–33)

Statistics	MRSH	JMU
First downs	17	22
Total yards	261	382
Rushing yards	141	244
Passing yards	120	138
Passing: Comp–Att–Int	13–25–0	14–19–1
Time of possession	24:27	35:33

Team	Category	Player	Statistics
Marshall	Passing	Braylon Braxton	13/24, 120 yards, TD
Marshall	Rushing	Jordan Houston	6 carries, 50 yards
Marshall	Receiving	Bralon Brown	3 receptions, 39 yards
James Madison	Passing	Alonza Barnett III	14/19, 138 yards, 2 TD, INT
James Madison	Rushing	Jobi Malary	16 carries, 106 yards, TD
James Madison	Receiving	Omarion Dollison	4 receptions, 46 yards, TD

=== Western Kentucky (Boca Raton Bowl) ===
2024 Boca Raton Bowl
Western Kentucky Hilltoppers (8–5, 6–2) at James Madison Dukes (8–4, 4–4)

Quarter	1	2	3	4	Total
Hilltoppers	0	14	0	3	17
Dukes	7	0	10	10	27

at FAU Stadium, Boca Raton, Florida

- Date: December 18th, 2024
- Game time: 5:30 p.m. EST
- Game weather: Sunny • Temperature: 80 °F (27 °C) • Wind: SE at 11 miles per hour (18 km/h)
- Game attendance: 15,808
- TV announcers (ESPN): Chris Cotter (play-by-play), Mark Herzlich (analyst) and Coley Harvey (sideline)

Game information

First Quarter

- (8:03) JMU – JC Evans 7 yard run, Noe Ruelas kick (Drive: 7 plays, 77 yards, 3:48; James Madison 7–0)

Second Quarter

- (13:34) WKU – Moussa Barry 17 yard pass from Caden Veltkamp, Lucas Carneiro kick (Drive: 8 plays, 48 yards, 2:57; Tied 7–7)
- (0:51) WKU – Dalvin Smith 11 yard pass from Caden Veltkamp, Lucas Carneiro kick (Drive: 7 plays, 83 yards, 1:55; Western Kentucky 14–7)

Third Quarter

- (8:09) JMU – Kyi Wright 1 yard pass from JC Evans, Noe Ruelas kick (Drive: 11 plays, 71 yards, 5:56; Tied 14–14)
- (2:25) JMU – Noe Ruelas 28 yard field goal (Drive: 8 plays, 30 yards, 4:20; James Madison 17–14)

Fourth Quarter

- (14:13) WKU – Lucas Carneiro 31 yard field goal (Drive: 7 plays, 62 yards, 3:12; Tied 17–17)
- (9:20) JMU – Taylor Thompson 21 yard pass from Billy Atkins, Noe Ruelas kick (Drive: 9 plays, 75 yards, 4:53; James Madison 24–17)
- (1:57) JMU – Noe Ruelas 25 yard field goal (Drive: 5 plays, 27 yards, 1:05; James Madison 27–17)

Win Probability

Line

Over/Under

Statistics	WKU	JMU
First downs	14	19
Total yards	318	394
Rushing yards	16	212
Passing yards	302	182
Passing: Comp–Att–Int	25–39–0	17–24–0
Time of possession	23:28	36:32

Team	Category	Player	Statistics
Western Kentucky	Passing	Caden Veltkamp	25/39, 302 yards, 2 TD
Western Kentucky	Rushing	Elijah Young	11 carries, 37 yards
Western Kentucky	Receiving	Dalvin Smith	2 receptions, 76 yards, TD
James Madison	Passing	Billy Atkins	16/23, 181 yards, TD
James Madison	Rushing	George Pettiway	14 carries, 100 yards
James Madison	Receiving	Omarion Dollison	6 receptions, 82 yards
