= 2024 Boca Raton Bowl =

Postseason college football bowl game

- 11th Boca Raton Bowl
Western Kentucky Hilltoppers	James Madison Dukes
(8–5)	(8–4)
CUSA	Sun Belt
17	27
Head coach: Tyson Helton	Head coach: Bob Chesney
	1	2	3	4	Total
Western Kentucky	0	14	0	3	17
James Madison	7	0	10	10	27
- Date: December 18, 2024
- Season: 2024
- Stadium: FAU Stadium
- Location: Boca Raton, Florida
- MVP: Off.: JC Evans (QB, James Madison); Def.: DJ Barksdale (NB), James Madison); Special Teams: Ryan Hanson (P, James Madison)
- Referee: Nolan Dumas (Mountain West)
- Attendance: 15,808

United States TV coverage
- Network: ESPN; ESPN Radio
- Announcers: Chris Cotter (play-by-play), Mark Herzlich (analyst), and Coley Harvey (sideline) (ESPN); Chris Carlin (play-by-play) and Freddie Coleman (analyst) (ESPN Radio)

The 2024 Boca Raton Bowl was a college football bowl game played on December 18, 2024, at FAU Stadium located in Boca Raton, Florida. The 11th annual Boca Raton Bowl game featured the Western Kentucky Hilltoppers from Conference USA against the James Madison Dukes from the Sun Belt Conference. The game began at approximately 5:30 p.m. EST and aired on ESPN. The Boca Raton Bowl was one of the 2024–25 bowl games concluding the 2024 FBS football season.

== Teams ==
The game featured the Western Kentucky Hilltoppers against the James Madison Dukes. This was the first time that the two programs ever played each other.

=== Western Kentucky Hilltoppers ===
Western Kentucky finished their season with an 8–5 overall record and a 6–2 record in Conference USA play. Tied with Sam Houston for second place in the conference, the Hilltoppers' win over the Bearkats on October 16 gave them the tiebreaker and the berth in the 2024 Conference USA Football Championship Game, where they lost to Jacksonville State.

This was Western Kentucky's third Boca Raton bowl, the most appearances in the game to this point; the 2017 Hilltoppers won the 2016 edition over Memphis, and the 2021 Hilltoppers won the 2021 edition over Appalachian State.

=== James Madison Dukes ===
James Madison finished their season with an 8–4 overall record and a 4–4 record in SBC play, tied for third place in the East Division with archrival Old Dominion. This was James Madison's first Boca Raton Bowl. Starting quarterback Alonza Barnett was unable to play due to injury, resulting in backup Billy Atkins getting the start. JC Evans split snaps with Atkins in the bowl game, winning Boca Raton Bowl Offensive MVP.

== Game summary ==
2024 Boca Raton Bowl

Quarter	1	2	3	4	Total
Western Kentucky	0	14	0	3	17
James Madison	7	0	10	10	27

at FAU Stadium • Boca Raton, Florida

- Date: Wednesday, December 18, 2024
- Game time: 5:32 p.m. EST
- Game weather: Sunny • Temperature: 77 °F (25 °C) • Wind: 8 mph (13 km/h) north
- Game attendance: 15,808
- Referee: Nolan Dumas
- TV announcers (ESPN): Chris Cotter (play-by-play), Mark Herzlich (analyst), and Coley Harvey (sideline)
- Box score

Game information

First Quarter

- (8:03) JMU – JC Evans 7 yard run, Noe Ruelas kick (Drive: 7 plays, 77 yards, 3:48; James Madison 7–0)

Second Quarter

- (13:34) WKU – Moussa Barry 17 yard pass from Caden Veltkamp, Lucas Carneiro kick (Drive: 8 plays, 48 yards, 2:57; Tied 7–7)
- (0:51) WKU – Dalvin Smith 11 yard pass from Caden Veltkamp, Lucas Carneiro kick (Drive: 7 plays, 83 yards, 1:55; Western Kentucky 14–7)

Third Quarter

- (8:09) JMU – Kyi Wright 1 yard pass from JC Evans, Noe Ruelas kick (Drive: 11 plays, 71 yards, 5:56; Tied 14–14)
- (2:25) JMU – Noe Ruelas 28 yard field goal (Drive: 8 plays, 30 yards, 4:20; James Madison 17–14)

Fourth Quarter

- (14:13) WKU – Lucas Carneiro 31 yard field goal (Drive: 7 plays, 62 yards, 3:12; Tied 17–17)
- (9:20) JMU – Taylor Thompson 21 yard pass from Billy Atkins, Noe Ruelas kick (Drive: 9 plays, 75 yards, 4:53; James Madison 24–17)
- (1:57) JMU – Noe Ruelas 25 yard field goal (Drive: 5 plays, 27 yards, 1:05; James Madison 27–17)

=== Statistics ===
Statistics	WKU	JMU
First downs	14	19
Plays–yards	59–318	70–394
Rushes–yards	20–16	46–212
Passing yards	302	182
Passing: comp–att–int	25–39–0	17–24–0
Time of possession	23:28	36:32

Team	Category	Player	Statistics
Western Kentucky	Passing	Caden Veltkamp	25/39, 302 yds, 2 TD
Western Kentucky	Rushing	Elijah Young	11 rushes, 37 yds
Western Kentucky	Receiving	Dalvin Smith	2 receptions, 76 yds
James Madison	Passing	Billy Atkins	16/23, 181 yds, TD
James Madison	Rushing	George Pettaway	14 rushes, 100 yds
James Madison	Receiving	Omarion Dollison	6 receptions, 82 yds
