= 2024 Western Kentucky Hilltoppers football team =

American college football season

2024 Western Kentucky Hilltoppers football

C-USA Championship, L 12–52 vs. Jacksonville State

Boca Raton Bowl, L 17–27 vs. James Madison
- Conference: Conference USA
- Record: 8–6 (6–2 C-USA)
- Head coach: Tyson Helton (6th season)
- Offensive coordinator: Will Friend (1st season)
- Co-offensive coordinator: Drew Hollingshead (2nd season)
- Offensive scheme: Air raid
- Defensive coordinator: Tyson Summers (3rd season)
- Base defense: 3–3–5
- Home stadium: Houchens Industries–L. T. Smith Stadium

2024 Conference USA football standings
	Conf.			Overall
Team	W		L	W		L
Jacksonville State y$	7	–	1	9	–	5
Western Kentucky y	6	–	2	8	–	6
Sam Houston	6	–	2	10	–	3
Liberty	5	–	3	8	–	4
Louisiana Tech	4	–	4	5	–	8
UTEP	3	–	5	3	–	9
FIU	3	–	5	4	–	8
New Mexico State	2	–	6	3	–	9
Middle Tennessee	2	–	6	3	–	9
Kennesaw State*	2	–	6	2	–	10
Championship: Jacksonville State 52, Western Kentucky 12
$ – Conference champion; y – Championship game participant; * – Ineligible for postseason play due to FCS-to-FBS transition rules

The 2024 Western Kentucky Hilltoppers football team represented Western Kentucky University in Conference USA (C-USA) during the 2024 NCAA Division I FBS football season. The Hilltoppers were led by Tyson Helton in his sixth year as the head coach. The Hilltoppers played their home games at Houchens Industries–L. T. Smith Stadium, located in Bowling Green, Kentucky.

== Preseason ==
=== C-USA media poll ===
The Conference USA preseason media poll was released on July 19. The Hilltoppers were predicted to finish second in the conference.

== Schedule ==
Date	Time	Opponent	Site	TV	Result	Attendance
August 31	6:00 p.m.	at No. 5 Alabama*	Bryant–Denny Stadium; Tuscaloosa, AL	ESPN	L 0–63	100,077
September 7	6:00 p.m.	Eastern Kentucky*	Houchens Industries–L. T. Smith Stadium; Bowling Green, KY (Battle of the Bluegrass)	ESPN+	W 31–0	16,712
September 14	6:00 p.m.	at Middle Tennessee	Johnny "Red" Floyd Stadium; Murfreesboro, TN (100 Miles of Hate)	ESPN+	W 49–21	12,227
September 21	6:00 p.m.	Toledo*	Houchens Industries–L. T. Smith Stadium; Bowling Green, KY	ESPN+	W 26–21	19,127
September 28	11:00 a.m.	at Boston College*	Alumni Stadium; Chestnut Hill, MA	ACCN	L 20–21	41,403
October 10	7:00 p.m.	UTEP	Houchens Industries–L. T. Smith Stadium; Bowling Green, KY	ESPNU	W 44–17	12,723
October 16	7:00 p.m.	at Sam Houston	Bowers Stadium; Huntsville, TX	ESPN2	W 31–14	8,914
October 30	6:30 p.m.	Kennesaw State	Houchens Industries–L. T. Smith Stadium; Bowling Green, KY	ESPN2	W 31–14	14,547
November 9	5:00 p.m.	at New Mexico State	Aggie Memorial Stadium; Las Cruces, NM	ESPN+	W 41–28	12,710
November 16	11:00 a.m.	Louisiana Tech^{†}	Houchens Industries–L. T. Smith Stadium; Bowling Green, KY	CBSSN	L 7–12	13,312
November 23	12:00 p.m.	at Liberty	Williams Stadium; Lynchburg, VA	ESPN+	L 21–38	17,930
November 30	3:00 p.m.	Jacksonville State	Houchens Industries–L. T. Smith Stadium; Bowling Green, KY	ESPNU	W 19–17	6,547
December 6	6:00 p.m.	at Jacksonville State	AmFirst Stadium; Jacksonville, AL (C-USA Championship Game)	CBSSN	L 12–52	15,628
December 18	4:30 p.m.	vs. James Madison	FAU Stadium; Boca Raton, FL (Boca Raton Bowl)	ESPN	L 17–27	15,808
*Non-conference game; ^{†}Homecoming; Rankings from AP Poll and CFP Rankings released prior to game; All times are in Central time

== Game summaries ==
=== at No. 5 Alabama ===
Game One – Western Kentucky Hilltoppers (0-0) at No. 5 Alabama Crimson Tide (0-0) – Game summary

Quarter	1	2	3	4	Total
Hilltoppers	0	0	0	0	0
No. 5 Crimson Tide	21	21	14	7	63

at Bryant-Denny Stadium • Tuscaloosa, AL

- Date: Saturday August 31st, 2024
- Game time: 7:00 PM EST
- Game weather: 85 °F (29 °C), Wind SE @ 3 mph
- Game attendance: 100,077
- Referee: Matt Loeffler
- TV announcers (ESPN): Dave Pasch (play-by-play), Dusty Dvoracek (analyst), and Taylor McGregor (sideline)
- Box Score

Game information

First quarter

- (10:07) ALA – Jalen Milroe 12-yard run (Graham Nicholson kick) (Drive: 2 plays, 16 yards, 0:41; Alabama 7-0)
- (5:01) ALA – Kendrick Law 22-yard pass from Jalen Milroe (Graham Nicholson kick) (Drive: 3 plays, 26 yards, 1:31; Alabama 14-0)
- (2:27) ALA – Ryan Coleman-Williams 84-yard pass from Jalen Milroe (Graham Nicholson kick) (Drive: 4 plays, 81 yards, 1:19; Alabama 21-0)

Second quarter

- (12:35) ALA – Jam Miller 39-yard run (Graham Nicholson kick) (Drive: 2 plays, 80 yards, 1:14; Alabama 28-0)
- (2:53) ALA – Justice Haynes 85-yard run (Graham Nicholson kick) (Drive: 2 plays, 96 yards, 0:33; Alabama 35-0)
- (1:30) ALA – Ryan Coleman-Williams 55-yard pass from Jalen Milroe (Graham Nicholson kick) (Drive: 2 plays, 55 yards, 0:15; Alabama 42-0)

Third quarter

- (6:30) ALA – Jalen Milroe 21-yard run (Graham Nicholson kick) (Drive: 9 plays, 61 yards, 4:10; Alabama 49-0)
- (2:51) ALA – Daniel Hill 2-yard run (Conor Talty kick) (Drive: 6 plays, 53 yards, 2:47; Alabama 56-0)

Fourth quarter

- (10:04) ALA – Ty Simpson 15-yard run (Conor Talty kick) (Drive: 10 plays, 79 yards, 3:58; Alabama 63-0)

Statistics	WKU	ALA
First downs	10	25
Total yards	67–145	65–600
Rushing yards	27–42	47–334
Passing yards	103	266
Passing: Comp–Att–Int	22–40–2	12–18–0
Time of possession	29:25	30:35

Team	Category	Player	Statistics
Western Kentucky	Passing	TJ Finley	18/31, 92 yards, 2 INT
Western Kentucky	Rushing	Elijah Young	10 carries, 18 yards
Western Kentucky	Receiving	Moussa Barry	4 receptions, 27 yards
Alabama	Passing	Jalen Milroe	7/9, 200 yards, 3 TD
Alabama	Rushing	Justice Haynes	4 carries, 102 yards, TD
Alabama	Receiving	Ryan Coleman-Williams	4 receptions, 139 yards, 2 TD

=== vs. Eastern Kentucky (FCS) (Battle of the Bluegrass) ===
Game Two – Eastern Kentucky Colonels (FCS) (0–1) at Western Kentucky Hilltoppers (0–1) – Game summary

Quarter	1	2	3	4	Total
Colonels (FCS)	0	0	0	0	0
Hilltoppers	10	7	0	14	31

at Houchens Industries-L. T. Smith Stadium • Bowling Green, Kentucky

- Date: Saturday September 7, 2024
- Game time: 7:00 p.m.
- Game weather: Sunny
- Game attendance: 16,712
- Referee: Reed Brotherton
- TV announcers (ESPN+): Steve Schlanger (play-by-play) and Terry Obee (analyst)
- Box Score

Game information

First quarter

- WKU – Lucas Carneiro 29-yard field goal, 12:11. Western Kentucky 3–0. Drive: 10 plays, 64 yards, 2:49.
- WKU – Elijah Young 1-yard run (Lucas Carniero kick), 0:22. Western Kentucky 10–0. Drive: 4 plays, 22 yards, 1:00.

Second quarter

- WKU – L.T. Sanders 2-yard run (Lucas Carniero kick), 3:41. Western Kentucky 17–0. Drive: 9 plays, 84 yards, 3:29.

Third quarter

No scoring plays

Fourth quarter

- WKU – Elijah Young 9-yard run (Lucas Carniero kick), 7:07. Western Kentucky 24–0. Drive: 9 plays, 80 yards, 4:20.
- WKU – Dalvin Smith 12-yard pass from TJ Finley (Lucas Carniero kick), 2:38. Western Kentucky 31–0. Drive: 7 plays, 77 yards, 2:19.

Statistics	EKU	WKU
First downs	13	25
Total yards	266	467
Rushing yards	190	116
Passing yards	76	351
Passing: Comp–Att–Int	11–20–0	27–39–0
Time of possession	34:10	25:50

Team	Category	Player	Statistics
Eastern Kentucky	Passing	Matt Morrissey	9/17, 70 yards
Eastern Kentucky	Rushing	Joshua Carter	19 rushes, 100 yards
Eastern Kentucky	Receiving	Marcus Calwise Jr.	4 receptions, 24 yards
Western Kentucky	Passing	TJ Finley	27/39, 351 yards, TD
Western Kentucky	Rushing	Elijah Young	13 rushes, 52 yards, 2 TD
Western Kentucky	Receiving	Kisean Johnson	6 receptions, 119 yards

=== at Middle Tennessee (100 Miles of Hate) ===
Game Three – Western Kentucky Hilltoppers (1–1) at Middle Tennessee Blue Raiders (1–1) – Game summary

Quarter	1	2	3	4	Total
Hilltoppers	14	7	21	7	49
Blue Raiders	0	0	14	7	21

at Johnny "Red" Floyd Stadium, Murfreesboro, TN

- Date: Saturday September 14, 2024
- Game time: 6:00 p.m.
- Game weather: Cloudy • Temperature: 84 °F (29 °C)
- Game attendance: 12,227
- Referee: Douglas Mercer
- TV announcers (ESPN+): Jake Rose (play-by-play), Jeremy Kellem (analyst) and Justin Beasley (sideline)
- Box Score

Game information
First quarter
- WKU – River Helms 4-yard pass from Caden Veltkamp (Lucas Carniero kick), 4:37. Western Kentucky 7–0. Drive: 12 plays, 60 yards, 5:17.
- WKU – Kisean Johnson 6-yard pass from Caden Veltkamp (Lucas Carniero kick), 1:05. Western Kentucky 14–0. Drive: 5 plays, 65 yards, 1:58.

Second quarter

- WKU – Easton Messer 10-yard pass from Caden Veltkamp (Lucas Carniero kick), 0:18. Western Kentucky 21–0. Drive: 11 plays, 99 yards, 2:54.

Third quarter

- WKU – K.D. Hutchinson 72-yard pass from Caden Veltkamp (Lucas Carniero kick), 14:07. Western Kentucky 28–0. Drive: 2 plays, 69 yards, 0:47.
- MTSU – Omari Kelly 37-yard pass from Nicholas Vattiato (Zeke Rankin kick), 10:12. Western Kentucky 28–7. Drive: 7 plays, 82 yards, 3:51.
- WKU – Caden Veltkamp 1-yard run (Lucas Carniero kick), 6:38. Western Kentucky 35–7. Drive: 7 plays, 67 yards, 3:24.
- MTSU – Omari Kelly 71-yard pass from Nicholas Vattiato (Zeke Rankin kick), 6:17. Western Kentucky 35–14. Drive: 1 play, 71 yards, 0:13.
- WKU – Kisean Johnson 36-yard pass from Dalvin Smith (Lucas Carniero kick), 3:28. Western Kentucky 42–14. Drive: 6 plays, 85 yards, 2:46.

Fourth quarter

- WKU – Trevor Borland 3-yard pass from Caden Veltkamp (Lucas Carniero kick), 9:01. Western Kentucky 49–14. Drive: 7 plays, 64 yards, 3:53.
- MTSU – Omari Kelly 7-yard pass from Nicholas Vattiato (Zeke Rankin kick), 5:47. Western Kentucky 49–21. Drive: 6 plays, 64 yards, 3:06.

Statistics	WKU	MTSU
First downs	30	21
Total yards	631	514
Rushing yards	150	58
Passing yards	481	456
Passing: Comp–Att–Int	31–37–0	24–31–1
Time of possession	31:22	28:38

Team	Category	Player	Statistics
Western Kentucky	Passing	Caden Veltkamp	27/30, 398 yds, 5 TD
Western Kentucky	Rushing	L.T. Sanders	8 rushes, 54 yds
Western Kentucky	Receiving	Kisean Johnson	8 receptions, 129 yds, 2 TD
Middle Tennessee	Passing	Nicholas Vattiato	24/31, 456 yds, 3 TD, INT
Middle Tennessee	Rushing	Nicholas Vattiato	9 rushes, 21 yds
Middle Tennessee	Receiving	Omari Kelly	9 receptions, 239 yds, 3 TD

=== vs. Toledo ===
Game Four – Toledo Rockets (3–0) at Western Kentucky Hilltoppers (2–1) – Game summary

Quarter	1	2	3	4	Total
Rockets	0	14	7	0	21
Hilltoppers	0	7	5	14	26

at Houchens Industries–L. T. Smith Stadium, Bowling Green, KY

- Date: Saturday September 21, 2024
- Game time: 6:00 p.m.
- Game weather: Sunny
- Game attendance: 19,127
- Referee: Rodney Burnette
- TV announcers (ESPN+): Jeff Hem (play-by-play) and Terry Obee (analyst)
- Box Score

Game information
First quarter
- No scoring plays.

Second quarter

- TOL – Tucker Gleason 1-yard run (Dylan Cunanan kick), 13:18. Toledo 7–0. Drive: 10 plays, 63 yards, 5:33.
- TOL – Anthony Torres 14-yard pass from Tucker Gleason (Dylan Cunanan kick), 2:30. Toledo 14–0. Drive: 9 plays, 43 yards, 4:55.
- WKU – Kisean Johnson 44-yard pass from Caden Veltkamp (Lucas Carniero kick), 1:53. Toledo 14–7. Drive: 2 plays, 63 yards, 0:29.

Third quarter

- WKU – Lucas Carniero 39-yard field goal, 13:12. Toledo 14–10. Drive: 4 plays, 1 yard, 1:53.
- TOL – Anthony Torres 7-yard pass from Tucker Gleason (Dylan Cunanan kick), 8:13. Toledo 21–10. Drive: 12 plays, 80 yards, 4:42.
- WKU – Devon Lynch 0-yard safety, 0:39. Toledo 21–12.

Fourth quarter

- WKU – Caden Veltkamp 7-yard run (Lucas Carniero kick), 10:43. Toledo 21–19. Drive: 3 plays, 49 yards, 0:47.
- WKU – Caden Veltkamp 3-yard run (Lucas Carniero kick), 5:16. Western Kentucky 26–21. Drive: 9 plays, 65 yards, 4:25.

Statistics	TOL	WKU
First downs	17	16
Total yards	325	313
Rushing yards	125	71
Passing yards	200	242
Passing: Comp–Att–Int	19–33–2	20–30–2
Time of possession	34:19	26:22

Team	Category	Player	Statistics
Toledo	Passing	Tucker Gleason	19/33, 200 yds, 2 TD, 2 INT
Toledo	Rushing	Tucker Gleason	12 rushes, 46 yds, TD
Toledo	Receiving	Jacquez Stuart	3 receptions, 93 yds
Western Kentucky	Passing	Caden Veltkamp	20/30, 242 yds, TD, 2 INT
Western Kentucky	Rushing	Elijah Young	9 rushes, 36 yds
Western Kentucky	Receiving	Kisean Johnson	6 receptions, 73 yds, TD

=== at Boston College ===
Game Five – Western Kentucky Hilltoppers (3–1) at Boston College Eagles (3–1) – Game summary

Quarter	1	2	3	4	Total
Hilltoppers	7	10	3	0	20
Eagles	0	7	0	14	21

at Alumni Stadium, Chestnut Hill, MA

- Date: Saturday September 28, 2024
- Game time: 11:00 a.m.
- Game weather: Cloudy
- Game attendance: 41,403
- Referee: Ron Hudson
- TV announcers (ACCN): Jorge Sedano (play-by-play), Orlando Franklin (analyst) and Morgan Uber (sideline)
- Box Score

Game information
First quarter
- WKU – Kisean Johnson 3-yard pass from Caden Veltkamp (Lucas Carniero kick), 3:05. Western Kentucky 7–0. Drive: 8 plays, 63 yards, 3:46.

Second quarter

- WKU – Easton Messer 7-yard pass from Caden Veltkamp (Lucas Carniero kick), 12:01. Western Kentucky 14–0. Drive: 6 plays, 47 yards, 2:51.
- BC – Kye Robichaux 3-yard run (Liam Connor kick), 2:08. Western Kentucky 14–7. Drive: 13 plays, 74 yards, 5:59.
- WKU – Lucas Carniero 22-yard field goal, 0:00. Western Kentucky 17–7. Drive: 12 plays, 71 yards, 2:08.

Third quarter

- WKU – Lucas Carniero 35-yard field goal, 8:44. Western Kentucky 20–7. Drive: 12 plays, 36 yards, 5:05.

Fourth quarter

- BC – Grayson James 1-yard run (Liam Connor kick), 11:36. Western Kentucky 20–14. Drive: 9 plays, 57 yards, 3:43.
- BC – Jerand Bradley 8-yard pass from Grayson James (Liam Connor kick), 3:33. Boston College 21–20. Drive: 6 plays, 20 yards, 2:50.

Statistics	WKU	BC
First downs	20	19
Total yards	355	279
Rushing yards	123	111
Passing yards	232	168
Passing: Comp–Att–Int	25–39–2	19–32–1
Time of possession	30:40	29:20

Team	Category	Player	Statistics
Western Kentucky	Passing	Caden Veltkamp	25/39, 232 yds, 2 TD, 2 INT
Western Kentucky	Rushing	Elijah Young	21 rushes, 85 yds
Western Kentucky	Receiving	River Helms	4 receptions, 72 yds
Boston College	Passing	Grayson James	19/32, 168 yds, TD, INT
Boston College	Rushing	Kye Robichaux	18 rushes, 81 yds, TD
Boston College	Receiving	Jaeden Skeete	4 receptions, 55 yds

=== vs. UTEP ===
Game Six – UTEP Miners (0–5) at Western Kentucky Hilltoppers (3–2) – Game summary

Quarter	1	2	3	4	Total
Miners	7	0	10	0	17
Hilltoppers	14	13	7	10	44

at Houchens Industries–L. T. Smith Stadium, Bowling Green, KY

- Date: Thursday October 10, 2024
- Game time: 7:00 p.m.
- Game weather: Sunny
- Game attendance: 12,723
- Referee: Reed Brotherton
- TV announcers (ESPNU): Mike Corey (play-by-play) and Rene Ingoglia (analyst)
- Box Score

Game information
First quarter
- WKU – Dalvin Smith 30-yard pass from Caden Veltkamp (Lucas Carniero kick), 7:40. Western Kentucky 7–0. Drive: 4 plays, 74 yards, 1:38.
- UTEP – Kenny Odom 76-yard pass from Cade McConnell (Buzz Flabiano kick), 7:02. Tied 7–7. Drive: 2 plays, 80 yards, 0:33.
- WKU – Michael Mathison 12-yard run (Lucas Carneiro kick), 2:18. Western Kentucky 14–7. Drive: 1 play, 12 yards, 0:05.

Second quarter

- WKU – Lucas Carneiro 25-yard field goal, 10:55. Western Kentucky 17–7. Drive: 9 plays, 51 yards, 4:34.
- WKU – Caden Veltkam 2-yard run (Lucas Carneiro kick), 5:32. Western Kentucky 24–7. Drive: 10 plays, 43 yards, 3:43.
- WKU – Lucas Carneiro 42-yard field goal, 0:00. Western Kentucky 27–7. Drive: 12 plays, 23 yards, 2:53.

Third quarter

- UTEP – Corey Wren 100-yard kickoff return (Buzz Flabiano kick), 14:47. Western Kentucky 27–14.
- UTEP – Buzz Flabiano 42-yard field goal, 5:29. Western Kentucky 27–17. Drive: 11 plays, 57 yards, 5:36.
- WKU – Michael Mathison 14-yard pass from Caden Veltkamp (Lucas Carneiro kick), 4:32. Western Kentucky 34–17. Drive: 3 plays, 75 yards, 0:57.

Fourth quarter

- WKU – Michael Mathison 3-yard pass from Caden Veltkamp (Lucas Carneiro kick), 12:27. Western Kentucky 41–17. Drive: 6 plays, 52 yards, 2:33.
- WKU – Lucas Carneiro 54-yard field goal, 4:49. Western Kentucky 44–17. Drive: 7 plays, 30 yards, 3:32.

Statistics	UTEP	WKU
First downs	18	20
Total yards	330	482
Rushing yards	152	218
Passing yards	178	264
Passing: Comp–Att–Int	14–24–1	18–27–1
Time of possession	30:23	29:37

Team	Category	Player	Statistics
UTEP	Passing	Cade McConnell	3/7, 96 yards, TD, INT
UTEP	Rushing	Ezell Jolly	27 carries, 119 yards
UTEP	Receiving	Kenny Odom	1 reception, 76 yards, TD
Western Kentucky	Passing	Caden Veltkamp	18/27, 264 yards, 3 TD, INT
Western Kentucky	Rushing	Elijah Young	16 carries, 60 yards
Western Kentucky	Receiving	Easton Messer	6 receptions, 106 yards

=== at Sam Houston ===
Game Seven – Western Kentucky Hilltoppers (4–2) at Sam Houston Bearkats (5–1) – Game summary

Quarter	1	2	3	4	Total
Hilltoppers	7	10	0	14	31
Bearkats	0	14	0	0	14

at Bowers Stadium, Huntsville, TX

- Date: Wednesday October 16, 2024
- Game time: 7:00 p.m.
- Game weather: Clear • Temperature: 68 °F (20 °C) • Wind: NE 8 miles per hour (13 km/h)
- Game attendance: 8,914
- Referee: Roy Bernard
- TV announcers (ESPN2): Lowell Galindo (play-by-play) and Fozzy Whittaker (analyst)
- Box Score

Game information

First quarter

- (12:20) WKU – River Helms 17-yard pass from Caden Veltkamp, Lucas Carneiro kick (Drive: 7 plays, 65 yards, 2:40; Western Kentucky 7–0)

Second quarter

- (14:50) SAM – Simeon Evans 37-yard pass from Hunter Watson, Christian Pavon kick (Drive: 8 plays, 77 yards, 3:03; Tied 7–7)
- (10:41) WKU – Lucas Carneiro 51-yard field goal (Drive: 10 plays, 32 yards, 4:09; Western Kentucky 10–7)
- (8:46) SAM – Michael Phoenix II 50-yard pass from Hunter Watson, Christian Pavon kick (Drive: 4 plays, 73 yards, 1:47; Sam Houston 14–10)
- (2:59) WKU – Elijah Young 11-yard pass from Caden Veltkamp, Lucas Carneiro kick (Drive: 13 plays, 75 yards, 5:47; Western Kentucky 17–14)

Third quarter

No scoring plays

Fourth quarter

- (11:45) WKU – K.D. Hutchinson 74-yard pass from Caden Veltkamp, Lucas Carneiro kick (Drive: 3 plays, 80 yards, 1:20; Western Kentucky 24–14)
- (9:31) WKU – Caden Veltkamp 19-yard run, Lucas Carneiro kick (Drive: 3 plays, 24 yards, 0:43; Western Kentucky 31–14)

Statistics	WKU	SHSU
First downs	23	22
Total yards	411	400
Rushing yards	130	165
Passing yards	281	235
Turnovers	1	2
Time of possession	29:45	30:15

Team	Category	Player	Statistics
Western Kentucky	Passing	Caden Veltkamp	20/29, 281 yards, 3 TD
Western Kentucky	Rushing	Elijah Young	23 carries, 97 yards
Western Kentucky	Receiving	K. D. Hutchinson	3 receptions, 88 yards, TD
Sam Houston	Passing	Hunter Watson	6/9, 128 yards, 2 TD
Sam Houston	Rushing	Jase Bauer	11 carries, 41 yards
Sam Houston	Receiving	Simeon Evans	5 receptions, 59 yards, TD

=== Kennesaw State ===
Game Eight – Kennesaw State Owls (1–6) at Western Kentucky Hilltoppers (5–2) – Game summary

Quarter	1	2	3	4	Total
Owls	7	0	0	7	14
Hilltoppers	21	3	0	7	31

at Houchens Industries–L. T. Smith Stadium, Bowling Green, KY

- Date: Wednesday October 30, 2024
- Game time: 6:30 p.m. EDT
- Game weather: Sunny
- Game attendance: 14,547
- Referee: Garrett Dickerson
- TV announcers (ESPN2): Clay Matvick (play-by-play) and Steve Addazio (analyst)
- Box Score

Game information

First quarter

- (11:54) WKU – Trevor Borland 5 yard pass from Caden Veltkamp, Lucas Carneiro kick (Drive: 8 plays, 79 yards, 3:01; WKU 7–0)
- (5:28) KENN – Michael Benefield 37 yard run, Austin Welch kick (Drive: 3 plays, 44 yards, 1:18; TIE 7–7)
- (3:16) WKU – Easton Messer 64 yard pass from Caden Veltkamp, Lucas Carneiro kick (Drive: 5 plays, 75 yards, 2:12; WKU 14–7)
- (0:00) WKU – George Hart III 30 yard run, Lucas Carneiro kick (Drive: 5 plays, 78 yards, 2:12; WKU 21–7)

Second quarter

- (3:46) WKU – Lucas Carneiro 32 yard field goal (Drive: 11 plays, 78 yards, 5:45; WKU 24–7)

Third quarter

No scoring plays

Fourth quarter

- (12:26) WKU – Noah Meyers 17 yard pass from Caden Veltkamp, Lucas Carneiro kick (Drive: 5 plays, 81 yards, 0:47; WKU 31–7)
- (5:19) KENN – Davis Bryson 20 yard run, Austin Welch kick (Drive: 14 plays, 82 yards, 2:13; WKU 31–14)

Statistics	KENN	WKU
First downs	18	24
Total yards	272	467
Rushing yards	176	191
Passing yards	96	276
Passing: Comp–Att–Int	13–26–1	17–22–0
Time of possession	32:54	27:06

Team	Category	Player	Statistics
Kennesaw State	Passing	Davis Bryson	13/26, 96 yards, 1 INT
Kennesaw State	Rushing	Michael Benefield	16 carries, 98 yards, 1 TD
Kennesaw State	Receiving	Carson Kent	3 receptions, 34 yards
Western Kentucky	Passing	Caden Veltkamp	17/22, 276 yards, 3 TD
Western Kentucky	Rushing	Elijah Young	15 carries, 114 yards
Western Kentucky	Receiving	Easton Messer	2 receptions, 68 yards, 1 TD

=== at New Mexico State ===
Game Nine – Western Kentucky Hilltoppers (6–2) at New Mexico State Aggies (2–6) – Game summary

Quarter	1	2	3	4	Total
Hilltoppers	14	10	7	10	41
Aggies	7	0	14	7	28

at Aggie Memorial Stadium, Las Cruces, NM

- Date: Saturday November 9, 2024
- Game time: 5:00 p.m. EST
- Game weather: Sunny • Temperature: 64 °F (18 °C) • Wind: W 4 miles per hour (6.4 km/h)
- Game attendance: 12,710
- Referee: Rodney Burnette
- TV announcers (ESPN+): Adam Young (play-by-play) and Danny Knee (analyst)
- Box Score

Game information

First quarter

- (13:07) WKU – Easton Messer 54-yard pass from Caden Veltkamp, Lucas Carneiro kick (Drive: 4 plays, 70 yards, 1:49; Western Kentucky 7–0)
- (9:59) WKU – Caden Veltkamp 1-yard run, Lucas Carneiro kick (Drive: 6 plays, 28 yards, 2:57; Western Kentucky 14–0)
- (3:01) NMSU – Mike Washington 1-yard run, Abraham Montaño kick (Drive: 13 plays, 70 yards, 6:52; Western Kentucky 14–7)

Second quarter

- (14:52) WKU – Kisean Johnson 51-yard pass from Dalvin Smith, Lucas Carneiro kick (Drive: 7 plays, 79 yards, 3:03; Western Kentucky 21–7)
- (0:00) WKU – Lucas Carneiro 42-yard field goal (Drive: 9 plays, 59 yards, 5:53; Western Kentucky 24–7)

Third quarter

- (9:14) NMSU – Mike Washington 3-yard run, Abraham Montaño kick (Drive: 5 plays, 36 yards, 2:38; Western Kentucky 24–14)
- (5:28) NMSU – Seth McGowan 7-yard run, Abraham Montaño kick (Drive: 6 plays, 92 yards, 2:24; Western Kentucky 24–21)
- (0:59) WKU – Caden Veltkamp 3-yard run, Lucas Carneiro kick (Drive: 9 plays, 75 yards, 4:29; Western Kentucky 31–21)

Fourth quarter

- (9:58) WKU – K. D. Hutchinson 28-yard pass from Caden Veltkamp, Lucas Carneiro kick (Drive: 6 plays, 51 yards, 2:47; Western Kentucky 38–21)
- (5:03) WKU – Lucas Carneiro 53-yard field goal (Drive: 4 plays, 1 yard, 2:21; Western Kentucky 41–21)
- (1:55) NMSU – Donovan Faupel 29-yard pass from Santino Marucci, Abraham Montaño kick (Drive: 10 plays, 75 yards, 3:08; Western Kentucky 41–28)

Statistics	WKU	NMSU
First downs	17	14
Total yards	413	460
Rushing yards	116	331
Passing yards	297	129
Passing: Comp–Att–Int	19–28–2	10–22–2
Time of possession	30:30	29:30

Team	Category	Player	Statistics
Western Kentucky	Passing	Caden Veltkamp	18/27, 246 yards, 2 TD, 2 INT
Western Kentucky	Rushing	Elijah Young	16 carries, 74 yards
Western Kentucky	Receiving	Kisean Johnson	5 receptions, 88 yards, TD
New Mexico State	Passing	Santino Marucci	10/20, 129 yards, TD, 2 INT
New Mexico State	Rushing	Mike Washington	19 carries, 152 yards, 2 TD
New Mexico State	Receiving	Seth McGowan	3 receptions, 47 yards

=== Louisiana Tech ===
Game Ten – Louisiana Tech Bulldogs (3–6) at Western Kentucky Hilltoppers (7–2) – Game summary

Quarter	1	2	3	4	Total
Bulldogs	3	6	0	3	12
Hilltoppers	0	7	0	0	7

at Houchens Industries–L. T. Smith Stadium, Bowling Green, KY

- Date: Saturday November 16, 2024
- Game time: 11:00 a.m. EST
- Game weather: Sunny
- Game attendance: 13,312
- Referee: Rory Bernard
- TV announcers (CBSSN): Alex Del Barrio (play-by-play) and Taylor McHargue (analyst)
- Box Score

Game information

First quarter

- (9:30) LT – Buck Buchanan 35-yard field goal (Drive: 8 plays, 56 yards, 4:05; Louisiana Tech 3–0)

Second quarter

- (14:16) WKU – Elijah Young 7-yard run, Lucas Carneiro kick (Drive: 14 plays, 97 yards, 5:31; Western Kentucky 7–3)
- (8:16) LT – Buck Buchanan 42-yard field goal (Drive: 12 plays, 56 yards, 5:54; Western Kentucky 7–6)
- (2:25) LT – Buck Buchanan 28-yard field goal (Drive: 8 plays, 49 yards, 4:13; Louisiana Tech 9–7)

Third quarter

No scoring plays

Fourth quarter

- (8:06) LT – Buck Buchanan 24-yard field goal (Drive: 13 plays, 51 yards, 6:58; Louisiana Tech 12–7)

Statistics	LT	WKU
First downs	18	12
Total yards	275	215
Rushing yards	209	63
Passing yards	66	152
Passing: Comp–Att–Int	12–15–0	18–26–0
Time of possession	39:38	20:22

Team	Category	Player	Statistics
Louisiana Tech	Passing	Evan Bullock	12/15, 66 yards
Louisiana Tech	Rushing	Amani Givens	17 carries, 103 yards
Louisiana Tech	Receiving	Tru Edwards	7 receptions, 52 yards
Western Kentucky	Passing	Caden Veltkamp	18/26, 152 yards
Western Kentucky	Rushing	Caden Veltkamp	8 carries, 17 yards
Western Kentucky	Receiving	Kisean Johnson	4 receptions, 40 yards

=== at Liberty ===
Game Eleven – Western Kentucky Hilltoppers (7–3) at Liberty Flames (7–2) – Game summary

Quarter	1	2	3	4	Total
Hilltoppers	0	7	14	0	21
Flames	0	21	7	10	38

at Williams Stadium, Lynchburg, VA

- Date: Saturday November 23, 2024
- Game time: 1:00 p.m. EST
- Game weather: Sunny • Temperature: 55 °F (13 °C) • Wind: NW 12 miles per hour (19 km/h)
- Game attendance: 17,930
- Referee: Ron Hudson
- TV announcers (ESPN+): Matt Warner (play-by-play), Joe Jauch (analyst) and Emily Austen (sideline)

Game information

First quarter

No scoring plays

Second quarter

- (13:17) WKU – Dalvin Smith 9-yard pass from Caden Veltkamp, Lucas Carneiro kick (Drive: 6 plays, 64 yards, 2:37; Western Kentucky 7–0)
- (9:30) LIB – Billy Lucas 2-yard run, Colin Karhu kick (Drive: 8 plays, 92 yards, 3:44; Tied 7–7)
- (2:05) LIB – Quinton Cooley 22-yard run, Colin Karhu kick (Drive: 8 plays, 67 yards, 3:49; Liberty 14–7)
- (0:10) LIB – Julian Gray 11-yard pass from Kaidon Salter, Colin Karhu kick (Drive: 7 plays, 90 yards, 0:45; Liberty 21–7)

Third quarter

- (10:33) WKU – George Hart III 2-yard run, Lucas Carneiro kick (Drive: 9 plays, 75 yards, 4:27; Liberty 21–14)
- (9:44) LIB – Quinton Cooley 2-yard run, Colin Karhu kick (Drive: 2 plays, 38 yards, 0:39; Liberty 28–14)
- (3:44) WKU – Kisean Johnson 16-yard pass from Caden Veltkamp, Lucas Carneiro kick (Drive: 13 plays, 75 yards, 6:00; Liberty 28–21)

Fourth quarter

- (11:27) LIB – Colin Karhu 29-yard field goal (Drive: 14 plays, 61 yards, 7:24; Liberty 31–21)
- (2:59) LIB – Kaidon Salter 3-yard run, Colin Karhu kick (Drive: 13 plays, 86 yards, 6:35; Liberty 38–21)

Statistics	WKU	LIB
First downs	19	29
Total yards	368	556
Rushing yards	106	419
Passing yards	262	137
Passing: Comp–Att–Int	20–34–3	7–12–0
Time of possession	25:17	34:43

Team	Category	Player	Statistics
Western Kentucky	Passing	Caden Veltkamp	20/34, 262 yards, 2 TD, 3 INT
Western Kentucky	Rushing	Elijah Young	9 carries, 60 yards
Western Kentucky	Receiving	Kisean Johnson	7 receptions, 94 yards, TD
Liberty	Passing	Kaidon Salter	6/11, 108 yards, TD
Liberty	Rushing	Quinton Cooley	24 carries, 166 yards, 2 TD
Liberty	Receiving	Julian Gray	2 receptions, 47 yards, TD

=== Jacksonville State ===
Game Twelve – Jacksonville State Gamecocks (8–3) at Western Kentucky Hilltoppers (7–4) – Game summary

Quarter	1	2	3	4	Total
Gamecocks	3	7	0	7	17
Hilltoppers	7	3	3	6	19

at Houchens Industries–L. T. Smith Stadium, Bowling Green, KY

- Date: Saturday November 30, 2024
- Game time: 3:00 p.m. EST
- Game weather: Overcast, 40 °F (4 °C)
- Game attendance: 6,547
- Referee: Reed Brotherton
- TV announcers (ESPNU): Matt Schumacker (play-by-play) and Dustin Fox (analyst)

Game information

First quarter

- WKU – Elijah Young 21-yard pass from Caden Veltkamp (Lucas Carneiro kick), 8:48. Hilltoppers 7–0. Drive: 7 plays, 76 yards, 2:40.
- JVST – Garrison Rippa 46-yard field goal, 3:19. Hilltoppers 7–3. Drive: 5 plays, 53 yards, 2:09.

Second quarter

- JVST – Tre Stewart 8-yard run (Garrison Rippa kick), 3:42. Gamecocks 10-7. Drive: 6 plays, 47 yards, 1:21.
- WKU – Lucas Carneiro 50-yard field goal, 0:41. Tied 10-10. Drive: 9 plays, 53 yards, 2:56.

Third quarter

- WKU – Lucas Carneiro 21-yard field goal, 7:31. Hilltoppers 13-10. Drive: 15 plays, 79 yards, 6:07.

Fourth quarter

- WKU – Lucas Carneiro 35-yard field goal, 11:37. Hilltoppers 16-10. Drive: 13 plays, 72 yards, 5:36.
- JVST – Logan Smothers 17-yard run (Garrison Rippa kick), 9:44. Gamecocks 17-16. Drive: 5 plays, 75 yards, 1:53.

Statistics	JVST	WKU
First downs	13	23
Total yards	328	426
Rushing yards	229	105
Passing yards	99	321
Passing: Comp–Att–Int	7–17–1	29–49–0
Time of possession	23:33	36:27

Team	Category	Player	Statistics
Jacksonville State	Passing	Logan Smothers	4/6, 62 yards
Jacksonville State	Rushing	Tyler Huff	13 carries, 97 yards
Jacksonville State	Receiving	Michael Pettway	1 reception, 47 yards
Western Kentucky	Passing	Caden Veltkamp	28/47, 301 yards, TD
Western Kentucky	Rushing	Elijah Young	19 carries, 91 yards
Western Kentucky	Receiving	Easton Messer	5 receptions, 84 yards

=== at Jacksonville State (C-USA Championship) ===
Game Thirteen – Western Kentucky Hilltoppers (8–4) at Jacksonville State Gamecocks (8–4) – Game summary

Quarter	1	2	3	4	Total
Hilltoppers	3	3	6	0	12
Gamecocks	14	14	10	14	52

at AmFirst Stadium • Jacksonville, AL

- Date: Friday December 6, 2024
- Game time: 6:00 p.m.
- Game weather: Temperature: 33 °F (1 °C) • Wind: Calm • Weather: Fair
- Game attendance: 15,628
- Referee: Rory Bernard
- TV announcers (CBSSN): Rich Waltz (play-by-play), Robert Turbin (analyst), and Amanda Guerra (sideline reporter)

Game information

First Quarter

- (10:39) WKU – Lucas Carneiro 54 yard field goal (Drive: 8 plays, 35 yards, 4:15; Western Kentucky 3–0)
- (7:39) JVST – Sean Brown 6 yard pass from Tyler Huff, Garrison Rippa kick (Drive: 6 plays, 75 yards, 3:00; Jacksonville State 7–3)
- (3:21) JVST – Cam Vaughn 26 yard pass from Tyler Huff, Garrison Rippa kick (Drive: 6 plays, 42 yards, 1:52; Jacksonville State 14–3)

Second Quarter

- (3:47) JVST – Tre Stewart 4 yard rush, Garrison Rippa kick (Drive: 10 plays, 85 yards, 4:14; Jacksonville State 21–3)
- (1:19) JVST – Tre Stewart 6 yard rush, Garrison Rippa kick (Drive: 4 plays, 57 yards, 0:51; Jacksonville State 28–3)
- (0:00) WKU – Lucas Carneiro 44 yard field goal (Drive: 7 plays, 49 yards, 1:19; Jacksonville State 28–6)

Third Quarter

- (10:12) JVST – Tyler Huff 3 yard rush, Garrison Rippa kick (Drive: 11 plays, 75 yards, 4:48; Jacksonville State 35–6)
- (6:21) JVST – Garrison Rippa 27 yard field goal ('Drive: 6 plays, 61 yards, 3:07; Jacksonville State 38–6)
- (2:16) WKU – Kisean Johnson 25 yard pass from Caden Veltkamp, two-point pass attempt failed (Drive: 8 plays, 75 yards, 4:05; Jacksonville State 38–12)

Fourth Quarter

- (11:01) JVST – Tre Stewart 29 yard rush, Garrison Rippa kick ('Drive: 10 plays, 75 yards, 6:16; Jacksonville State 45–12)
- (3:00) JVST – Logan Smothers 10 yard rush, Garrison Rippa kick ('Drive: 10 plays, 61 yards, 6:41; Jacksonville State 52–12)

Statistics	WKU	JVST
First downs	17	26
Total yards	229	562
Rushing yards	88	386
Passing yards	141	176
Passing: Comp–Att–Int	18–30–0	11–15–0
Time of possession	24:42	35:18

Team	Category	Player	Statistics
Western Kentucky	Passing	Caden Veltkamp	18/30, 141 yards, TD
Western Kentucky	Rushing	Elijah Young	19 carries, 108 yards
Western Kentucky	Receiving	Easton Messer	7 receptions, 83 yards
Jacksonville State	Passing	Tyler Huff	11/15, 176 yards, 2 TD
Jacksonville State	Rushing	Tre Stewart	27 carries, 201 yards, 3 TD
Jacksonville State	Receiving	Cam Vaughn	4 receptions, 91 yards, TD

=== James Madison (Boca Raton Bowl) ===
2024 Boca Raton Bowl
Western Kentucky Hilltoppers (8–5, 6–2) at James Madison Dukes (8–4, 4–4)

Quarter	1	2	3	4	Total
Hilltoppers	0	14	0	3	17
Dukes	7	0	10	10	27

at FAU Stadium, Boca Raton, Florida

- Date: December 18th, 2024
- Game time: 4:30 p.m. CST
- Game weather: Sunny • Temperature: 80 °F (27 °C) • Wind: SE at 11 miles per hour (18 km/h)
- Game attendance: 15,808
- TV announcers (ESPN): Chris Cotter (play-by-play), Mark Herzlich (analyst) and Coley Harvey (sideline)

Game information

First Quarter

- (8:03) JMU – JC Evans 7 yard run, Noe Ruelas kick (Drive: 7 plays, 77 yards, 3:48; James Madison 7–0)

Second Quarter

- (13:34) WKU – Moussa Barry 17 yard pass from Caden Veltkamp, Lucas Carneiro kick (Drive: 8 plays, 48 yards, 2:57; Tied 7–7)
- (0:51) WKU – Dalvin Smith 11 yard pass from Caden Veltkamp, Lucas Carneiro kick (Drive: 7 plays, 83 yards, 1:55; Western Kentucky 14–7)

Third Quarter

- (8:09) JMU – Kyi Wright 1 yard pass from JC Evans, Noe Ruelas kick (Drive: 11 plays, 71 yards, 5:56; Tied 14–14)
- (2:25) JMU – Noe Ruelas 28 yard field goal (Drive: 8 plays, 30 yards, 4:20; James Madison 17–14)

Fourth Quarter

- (14:13) WKU – Lucas Carneiro 31 yard field goal (Drive: 7 plays, 62 yards, 3:12; Tied 17–17)
- (9:20) JMU – Taylor Thompson 21 yard pass from Billy Atkins, Noe Ruelas kick (Drive: 9 plays, 75 yards, 4:53; James Madison 24–17)
- (1:57) JMU – Noe Ruelas 25 yard field goal (Drive: 5 plays, 27 yards, 1:05; James Madison 27–17)

Win Probability

Line

Over/Under

Statistics	WKU	JMU
First downs	14	19
Total yards	318	394
Rushing yards	16	212
Passing yards	302	182
Passing: Comp–Att–Int	25–39–0	17–24–0
Time of possession	23:28	36:32

Team	Category	Player	Statistics
Western Kentucky	Passing	Caden Veltkamp	25/39, 302 yards, 2 TD
Western Kentucky	Rushing	Elijah Young	11 carries, 37 yards
Western Kentucky	Receiving	Dalvin Smith	2 receptions, 76 yards, TD
James Madison	Passing	Billy Atkins	16/23, 181 yards, TD
James Madison	Rushing	George Pettiway	14 carries, 100 yards
James Madison	Receiving	Omarion Dollison	6 receptions, 82 yards

== Roster ==
2024 Western Kentucky Hilltoppers football team roster
Players
Coaches
Offense

Pos.	#	Name	Class
WR	0	Kisean Johnson	Sr
QB	2	T. J. Finley	Jr
RB	3	Elijah Young	Sr
WR	4	Michael Mathison	GS
WR	5	Bryce Childress	Sr
WR	6	Demick Starling	Jr
RB	7	L. T. Sanders	Jr
WR	8	Easton Messer	So
RB	9	George Hart III	Jr
QB	10	Caden Veltkamp	So
WR	11	Koy Moore	Sr
QB	11	Tucker Parks	Fr
QB	12	Turner Helton	So
QB	14	Willie Taggart Jr.	Jr
WR	15	K.D. Hutchinson	So
QB	16	Rodney Tisdale Jr.	Fr
WR	17	Dalvin Smith	Sr
WR	18	Moussa Barry	So
WR	19	Javy Bunton	Jr
WR	20	Jaleel Walker	Jr
WR	21	Marvin Sims	So
WR	22	Justin Brown	Fr
WR	23	Jax Cooper	So
WR	24	Damari Jefferson	Fr
WR	25	Dallen Ponder	Fr
WR	26	Jarvis Hayes	Fr
RB	27	Corey Landers	Fr
RB	28	Javon McMahan	Fr
RB	30	Jalen Hampton	Jr
RB	34	Donovan Jones	Fr
OL	50	Wesley Horton	Jr
OL	53	Marshall Jackson	Jr
OL	56	Leavy Johnson	Fr
OL	58	Evan Wibberley	So
OL	62	Michael Moment	Sr
OL	65	Rodney Newsom Jr.	So
OL	67	Hayden Todd	So
OL	68	Gabe Claybrook	Fr
OL	71	Stacey Wilkins	Sr
OL	73	Travon Taylor	Sr
OL	74	Michael Ondelacy	Sr
OL	75	Gabriel Arnold	Fr
OL	77	Melvin Collins Jr.	Jr
OL	78	Quantavious Lesue	Sr
OL	79	Blake Austin	Sr
WR	80	Cameron Flowers	Fr
TE	81	Noah Meyers	Fr
WR	82	Denzil Alleyne	Sr
WR	83	Jaylen Hampton	Fr
TE	84	Elvin Fofanah	Sr
TE	86	Trevor Borland	Sr
TE	87	River Helms	Jr
TE	88	Aiden Miller	Fr
OL, TE	89	Colten Cable	Sr
TE	89	C.J. Kiss	Jr

Defense

Pos.	#	Name	Class
DL	0	Hosea Wheeler	Jr
LB	2	Terreance Ellis	Jr
LB	3	Darius Thomas	So
DB	4	Anthony Johnson Jr.	Sr
LB	5	Kylan Guidry	Sr
DB	6	Nazir Ward	So
DB	7	Demarko Williams	Jr
DE	8	Deante McCray	So
LB	9	Sebastian Benjamin	Sr
DB	10	Jaymar Mundy	Jr
DB	11	Kent Robinson	Jr
LB	12	Chandler Matthews	Sr
DL	13	Terrion Thompson	Sr
DB	14	Devonte' Mathews	Sr
DE	15	Zach Edwards	Sr
LB	16	Lofton Howard	Fr
DB	17	Dave Herard	Jr
LB	18	Keondre Williams	Sr
DB	19	Virgil Marshall	Jr
DB	20	Tate Titshaw	Fr
DB	21	Upton Stout	Jr
DB	23	Keyshawn Swanson	Sr
DB	24	Lataj Wright	Jr
DB	25	Xavion "Tutu" Griffin	Fr
DB	26	Jai Eugene Jr.	Fr
DB	28	Ely George	Jr
DB	29	Joshua Mensah	So
DB	30	Jalen Jackson	Fr
LB	31	Anthony Brackenridge	Jr
LB	33	Eli Jones	So
LB	34	Koron Hayward	So
DL	35	Dallas Walker	Jr
DB	36	Khrystian Washington	So
DB	37	Marvelous Owens	Jr
LB	38	Reginald Allen Jr.	So
LB	40	Reid Jamerson	So
DB	41	Alex Ford	So
LB	42	Trent Zappe	So
DE	44	Harper Holloman	Fr
LB	45	Nathan Griffin	Jr
LB	46	Miller Malone	Fr
LB	48	Zsacari Minnis	Fr
LB	51	Devon Lynch	Sr
DL	90	Chukwunedu Okeke	Fr
DE	92	Marcus Patterson	So
DL	93	Jalen Hand	Fr
DL	94	Jayden Loving	Jr
DL	96	Brandon Tobias II	Fr
DL	97	Ki'Shawn Harvey	Fr

Special teams

Pos.	#	Name	Class
K	17	Lucas Carneiro	So
P	18	Cole Maynard	Jr
K	43	Jackson Smith	So
K/P	47	Riley Stephens	Sr
LS	49	Drew Wilson	Sr
LS	55	Rex Robich	Jr
LS	57	Kolbyn Price	Fr
K	58	Michael Buck	Fr

Head coach

- Tyson Helton

Coordinators/assistant coaches

- Andy Larussa (assistant head coach / special teams coordinator)
- Tyson Summers (Defensive coordinator)
- Will Friend (Co-Offensive coordinator)
- Drew Hollingshead (Co-offensive coordinator / quarterbacks)
- Andre Crenshaw (running backs)
- Joe Bernardi (Offensive line)
- Da'Von Brown (defensive backs)
- Carson Hall (defensive line)
- Davis Merritt (inside linebackers)
- Jason Martin (cornerbacks)
- Zak Mizell (wide receivers)

Legend

- (C) Team captain
- (S) Suspended
- (I) Ineligible
- Injured
- Redshirt

Roster
