= Eric O'Neill (American football) =

American football player (born 2003)

No. 66 – Detroit Lions
- Position: Defensive end
- Roster status: Active

Personal information
- Born: July 1, 2003 (age 23); Staten Island, New York, U.S.
- Listed height: 6 ft 2 in (1.88 m)
- Listed weight: 250 lb (113 kg)

Career information
- High school: Tottenville (Staten Island, New York)
- College: LIU (2021–2023); James Madison (2024); Rutgers (2025)
- NFL draft: 2026: undrafted

Career history
- Detroit Lions (2026–present)

Awards and highlights
- Third-team FCS All-American (2023); NEC Defensive Player of the Year (2023); NEC Defensive Rookie of the Year (2022); First-team All-SBC (2024); 2× First-team All-NEC (2022, 2023)

Career NFL statistics as of Week 7, 2026
- Total tackles: 8
- Stats at Pro Football Reference

Eric O'Neill (born July 1, 2003) is an American football defensive lineman for the Detroit Lions of the National Football League (NFL). He played college football for the LIU Sharks, James Madison Dukes, and Rutgers Scarlet Knights. O'Neill was signed by the Lions as an undrafted free agent following the 2026 NFL Draft.

== Early life ==
O'Neill attended Tottenville High School in Staten Island and committed to play college football for the LIU Sharks.

== College career ==
In three years at LIU from 2021 to 2023, O'Neill totaled 119 tackles with 44.5 for a loss, 15.5 sacks, four pass defections, an interception, and three forced fumbles. He was a two-time first-team all-Northeast Conference (NEC) honoree, the NEC defensive player of the year, and NEC defensive freshman of the year. After the 2023 season, he entered the NCAA transfer portal.

O'Neill transferred to play for the James Madison Dukes. In 2024, he notched 52 tackles with 18.5 for a loss, 13 sacks, three pass deflections, an interception, and a touchdown, earning first-team all-Sun Belt honors. After the season, O'Neill entered the NCAA transfer portal.

O'Neill transferred to play for the Rutgers Scarlet Knights.

== Professional career ==
Pre-draft measurables
Height	Weight	Arm length	Hand span	Wingspan	40-yard dash	10-yard split	20-yard split	20-yard shuttle	Three-cone drill	Vertical jump	Broad jump	Bench press
6 ft 2 1/8 in (1.88 m)	247 lb (112 kg)	31 in (0.79 m)	9 5/8 in (0.24 m)	6 ft 4 1/4 in (1.94 m)	4.86 s	1.69 s	2.81 s	4.40 s	7.38 s	35.5 in (0.90 m)	9 ft 9 in (2.97 m)	27 reps
All values from Pro Day

O'Neill was signed as an undrafted free agent by the Detroit Lions after the conclusion of the 2026 NFL draft.
