= Tyson Helton =

American football player and coach (born 1977)

Current position
- Title: Head coach
- Team: Western Kentucky
- Conference: CUSA
- Record: 61–43

Biographical details
- Born: June 20, 1977 (age 49); Gainesville, Florida, U.S.

Playing career
- 1996–1999: Houston
- Position: Quarterback

Coaching career (HC unless noted)
- 2000: Hawaii (GA)
- 2001–2003: Hawaii (ST/TE)
- 2004–2006: Memphis (ST/TE)
- 2007–2011: UAB (QB)
- 2012: UAB (RB)
- 2013: Cincinnati (ST/TE)
- 2014–2015: Western Kentucky (OC/QB)
- 2016–2017: USC (PGC/QB)
- 2018: Tennessee (OC/QB)
- 2019–present: Western Kentucky

Head coaching record
- Overall: 61–43
- Bowls: 5–2

Accomplishments and honors

Championships
- C-USA East division (2021)

Awards
- C-USA Coach of the Year (2019)

Tyson Helton (born June 20, 1977) is an American college football coach and former quarterback. He is the head football coach for Western Kentucky University, a position he has held since 2019. He played college football at Houston from 1996 to 1999. He previously served as the offensive coordinator and quarterbacks coach at Tennessee (2018), quarterbacks coach and passing game coordinator at USC (2016–2017), offensive coordinator at Western Kentucky (2014–2015), and as an assistant at Cincinnati, UAB, Memphis, and Hawaii.

Tyson's father, Kim Helton, is a former head football coach, and his older brother Clay Helton is the current head coach at Georgia Southern. Due to his father's career as a collegiate football coach, Helton was exposed to football from an early age. He played college football at Houston, where he played mostly as a backup. He joined the coaching ranks immediately upon graduation from college, working initially for June Jones as an assistant at Hawaii. He gradually worked his way through the ranks at various NCAA Division I schools before being named head coach at Western Kentucky in 2019.

== Playing career ==
A native of Gainesville, Florida, Helton played quarterback at Clements High School in Sugar Land, Texas. He played college football at Houston from 1996 to 1999, during his father's tenure as the Cougars' head coach. As a backup quarterback, Helton completed 44 of 109 passes for 454 yards, 1 touchdown and 6 INTs during his career. He graduated with a bachelor's degree in business in 1999.

== Coaching career ==
Helton began coaching as a graduate assistant at Hawaii under head coach June Jones in 2000, working primarily with special teams. The following season, he was hired as the Warriors' special teams coach. During this season, Hawaii led the nation in kickoff return yardage, averaging an NCAA record 30.3 yards per return. Chad Owens, who was among the players Helton coached on special teams, set school records for all-purpose yardage.

From 2004 to 2006, Helton coached tight ends and special teams on the staff of Coach Tommy West at Memphis. Players he coached during this period included future New England Patriots kicker Stephen Gostkowski, who became the school's all-time career scoring leader, and was named Conference USA Special Teams Player of the Year in 2005.

In 2007, Helton joined the UAB Blazers staff as quarterbacks coach under head coach Neil Callaway. His father, Kim, had been hired as the Blazers' offensive coordinator. Under Helton's tutelage, UAB quarterback Joe Webb became the first player in NCAA history to pass for over 2,000 yards and rush for over 1,000 yards in consecutive seasons. After Callaway was fired in 2011, Helton switched to running backs coach on the staff of newly-hired head coach Garrick McGee. During Helton's only season on McGee's staff, Blazers running back Darrin Reaves rushed for over a thousand yards and was awarded all-conference honors.

After spending the 2013 season on the Cincinnati Bearcats staff, Helton was hired as the offensive coordinator and quarterbacks coach under head coach Jeff Brohm at Western Kentucky. During his first season in 2014, the Hilltoppers' offense set several dozen school records, and finished fourth in the nation in total offense. Quarterback Brandon Doughty passed for 4,830 yards and 49 touchdowns, and was awarded the Sammy Baugh Trophy at the end of the season. Helton's 2015 offense finished in the top 10 nationally in total yards per game, passing yards per game, scoring, and passing efficiency, and he was among the finalists for the FootballScoop Offensive Coordinator of the Year award. That year, Doughty led the nation in completion percentage, passing yards, and passing touchdowns.

In 2016, Helton, was hired as the quarterbacks coach and passing game coordinator at USC, where his brother, Clay Helton, was serving as head coach. Under Tyson Helton's guidance in 2016, USC quarterback Sam Darnold completed 67.2% of his passes, won the Archie Griffin Award, and was named Rose Bowl MVP. Helton was named the FootballScoop Quarterbacks Coach of the Year.

In December 2017, Helton was hired as the offensive coordinator and quarterbacks coach at Tennessee, joining the staff of newly hired head coach Jeremy Pruitt.

In November 2018, Helton was hired as the head football coach at Western Kentucky University.

== Personal ==
Helton and his wife, April, have four children: Shelby, Presley, and twins, Cole and Clay.

== Head coaching record ==
Year	Team	Overall	Conference	Standing	Bowl/playoffs
Western Kentucky Hilltoppers (Conference USA) (2019–present)
2019	Western Kentucky	9–4	6–2	T–2nd (East)	W First Responder
2020	Western Kentucky	5–7	4–3	3rd (East)	L LendingTree
2021	Western Kentucky	9–5	7–1	1st (East)	W Boca Raton
2022	Western Kentucky	9–5	6–2	T–2nd	W New Orleans
2023	Western Kentucky	8–5	5–3	4th	W Famous Toastery
2024	Western Kentucky	8–6	6–2	T–2nd	L Boca Raton
2025	Western Kentucky	9–4	6–2	3rd	W New Orleans
2026	Western Kentucky	4–7	3–4		
Western Kentucky:		61–43	43–19		
Total:		61–43			
National championship Conference title Conference division title or championship game berth
