= List of Sam Houston Bearkats head football coaches =

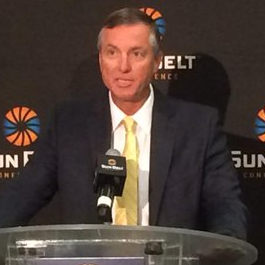
Willie Fritz served as the 14th head coach of the Sam Houston Bearkats from 2010 to 2013.

The Sam Houston Bearkats college football team represents Sam Houston State University as a member of Conference USA (C-USA). The Bearkats competes as part of the NCAA Division I Football Bowl Subdivision. The program has had 16 head coaches and one interim head coach since it began play during the 1912 season. Between 2014 and 2024, K. C. Keeler served as head coach at Sam Houston. Since December 2024, Phil Longo has served as head coach at Sam Houston.

Since 1912, four coaches have led Sam Houston in postseason appearances: Paul Pierce, Ron Randleman, Willie Fritz, Keeler, and Brad Cornelsen. Four of those coaches also won conference championships: J. W. Jones captured one as a member of the Texas Intercollegiate Athletic Association; Pierce captured four as a member of the Lone Star Conference; Randleman captured two as a member of the Gulf Star Conference; and Randleman captured three, Fritz two, and Keeler four as a member of the Southland Conference. The Bearkats also won national championships under Pierce in 1964 (NAIA) and under Keeler in 2020–21 (FCS).

Randleman is the leader in seasons coached and games won, with 131 victories during his 23 years with the program. Fritz has the highest winning percentage with .727, and Billy Tidwell has the lowest winning percentage with .274.

== Key ==
Key to symbols in coaches list
General		Overall		Conference		Postseason (Note: Although the first Rose Bowl Game was played in 1902, it has been continuously played since the 1916 game, and is recognized as the oldest bowl game by the NCAA. "—" indicates any season prior to 1916 when postseason games were not played.)	
No.	Order of coaches (Note: A running total of the number of head coaches, with coaches who served separate tenures being counted only once. Interim head coaches are represented with "Int" and are not counted in the running total. "—" indicates the team played but either without a coach or no coach is on record. "X" indicates an interim year without play.)	GC	Games coached	CW	Conference wins	PW	Postseason wins
DC	Division championships	OW	Overall wins	CL	Conference losses	PL	Postseason losses
CC	Conference championships	OL	Overall losses	CT	Conference ties	PT	Postseason ties
NC	National championships	OT	Overall ties (Note: Overtime rules in college football were introduced in 1996, making ties impossible in the period since.)	C%	Conference winning percentage		
†	Elected to the College Football Hall of Fame	O%	Overall winning percentage (Note: When computing the win–loss percentage, a tie counts as half a win and half a loss.)				

== Coaches ==
List of head football coaches showing season(s) coached, overall records, conference records, postseason records, championships and selected awards (Note: Statistics correct as of the end of the 2025 NCAA Division I FBS football season.)
No.	Name	Season(s) (Note: Sam Houston did not field teams in 1918 due to World War I and in 1943, 1944, and 1945 due to World War II.)	GC	OW	OL	OT	O%	CW	CL	CT	C%	PW	PL	PT	DC	CC	NC	Awards
1	Sheldon R. Warner	1912–1913	9	5	3	1	0.611	—	—	—	—	—	—	—	—	—	0	—
2	Gene Berry	1914–1917; 1919	30	14	15	1	0.483	—	—	—	—	—	—	—	—	—	0	—
3	Mutt Gee	1920–1922	17	6	7	4	0.471	—	—	—	—	—	—	—	—	—	0	—
4	J. W. Jones	1923–1935	116	54	53	9	0.504	31	27	5	0.532	—	—	—	—	1	0	—
5	Henry O. Crawford	1936–1937	19	7	12	0	0.368	1	7	0	0.125	—	—	—	—	0	0	—
6	Puny Wilson	1938–1942; 1946–1951	105	50	49	6	0.505	18	27	3	0.406	—	—	—	—	0	0	—
7	Paul Pierce	1952–1967	153	94	52	7	0.637	57	41	4	0.578	3	1	1	—	4	1 – 1964	—
8	Tom Page	1968–1971	42	20	19	3	0.512	15	15	2	0.500	0	0	0	—	0	0	—
9	Allen Boren	1972–1973	21	7	14	0	0.333	6	11	0	0.353	0	0	0	—	0	0	—
10	Billy Tidwell	1974–1977	42	11	30	1	0.274	10	22	0	0.313	0	0	0	—	0	0	—
11	Melvin Brown	1978–1981	41	12	29	0	0.293	8	20	0	0.286	0	0	0	—	0	0	—
12	Ron Randleman	1982–2004	259	131	125	3	0.512	62	75	2	0.453	3	4	0	—	5	0	—
13	Todd Whitten	2005–2009	53	25	28	—	0.472	16	17	—	0.485	0	0	—	—	0	0	—
14	Willie Fritz	2010–2013	55	40	15	—	0.727	21	7	—	0.750	7	3	—	—	2	0	AFCA FCS Coach of the Year (2011); Liberty Mutual Coach of the Year Award (2012)
15	K. C. Keeler	2014–2024	136	97	39	—	0.713	65	21	—	0.756	14	5	—	—	4	1 – 2020–21	Eddie Robinson Award (2016)
Int.	Brad Cornelsen (Note: Brad Cornelsen was named interim head coach for the 2024 New Orleans Bowl, following the resignation of K. C. Keeler as head coach.)	2024	1	1	0	—	1.000	0	0	—	–	1	0	—	0	0	—	—
16	Phil Longo	2025–present	12	2	10	—	0.167	1	7	—	0.125	0	0	—	0	0	—	—
