= 2024 NCAA Division I FBS football season =

American college football season

2024 NCAA Division I FBS season
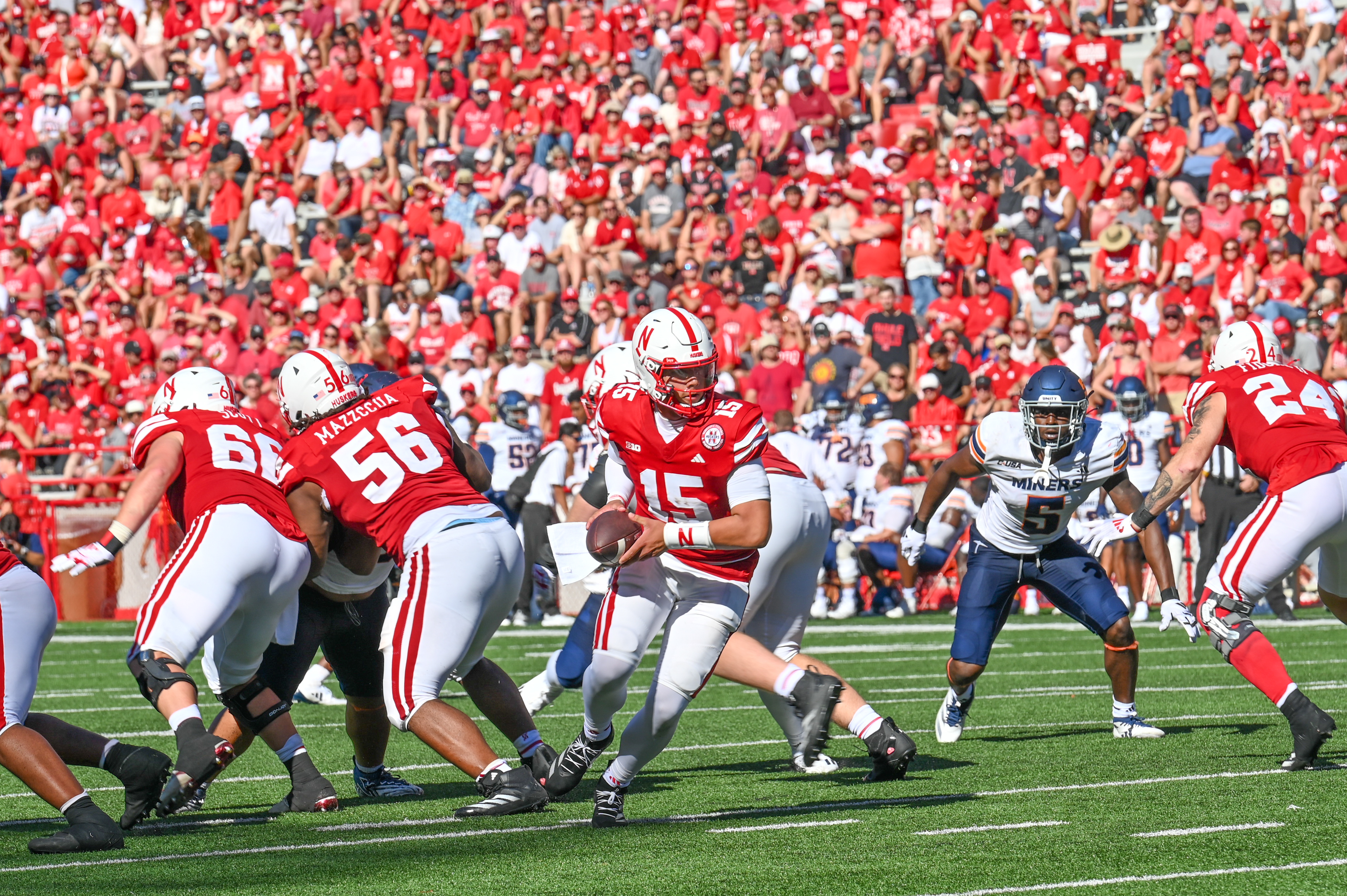
- Nebraska Cornhuskers quarterback Dylan Raiola prepares for a handoff during a game against the UTEP Miners on August 31, 2024.
- Number of teams: 134
- Duration: August 24 – December 14, 2024
- Preseason AP No. 1: Georgia

Postseason
- Duration: December 14, 2024 – January 20, 2025
- Bowl games: 41 (Note: 41 FBS bowl games plus the College Football Playoff National Championship Game.)
- AP Poll No. 1: Ohio State
- Coaches Poll No. 1: Ohio State
- Heisman Trophy: Travis Hunter, WR/CB, Colorado

College Football Playoff
- 2025 College Football Playoff National Championship
- Site: Mercedes-Benz Stadium (Atlanta, Georgia) (Note: The championship game was originally scheduled to be played at Allegiant Stadium in Paradise, Nevada.)
- Champion(s): Ohio State

NCAA Division I FBS football seasons
- ← 2023 2025 →

The 2024 NCAA Division I FBS football season was the 155th season of college football in the United States, the 119th season organized by the National Collegiate Athletic Association (NCAA), and the 49th of the highest level of competition, the Football Bowl Subdivision (FBS). The regular season began on August 24 and ended on December 14. The postseason began on December 14, and, aside from any all-star games that were scheduled, ended on January 20, 2025, with the College Football Playoff National Championship at Mercedes-Benz Stadium in Atlanta. This was the first season of the new College Football Playoff (CFP) system, with the bracket being expanded to 12 teams.

It was the first time since the 2021 season that no major team finished the season undefeated, as the Oregon Ducks, the season's last undefeated team, were defeated by the eventual national champion Ohio State Buckeyes 41–21 in the Rose Bowl. The season's Heisman Trophy winner was Colorado Buffaloes cornerback and wide receiver Travis Hunter, the first two-way player to win the award since Charles Woodson in 1997.

== Conference realignment ==
One school played its first FBS season in 2024. Kennesaw State (from FCS independents) began its transition from Division I FCS in 2023 and joined Conference USA (CUSA) in July 2024. One formerly independent school, Army, joined the American Athletic Conference (AAC) in 2024. SMU left the AAC and joined the Atlantic Coast Conference (ACC) in 2024.

Overall, 10 schools from the Pac-12 left for another conference in 2024. The 10 teams and their new conferences are:

- Big 12: Arizona, Arizona State, Colorado, and Utah
- ACC: California and Stanford
- Big Ten: Oregon, UCLA, USC, and Washington

The remaining two schools in the Pac-12, Oregon State and Washington State, made an agreement with the Mountain West Conference (MW) such that each remaining Pac-12 team will play six MW teams in 2024.

Team	Conference in 2023	Conference in 2024
Arizona	Pac-12	Big 12
Arizona State	Pac-12	Big 12
Army	Independent (FBS)	American
California	Pac-12	ACC
Colorado	Pac-12	Big 12
Kennesaw State	Independent (FCS)	CUSA
Oklahoma	Big 12	SEC
Oregon	Pac-12	Big Ten
SMU	American	ACC
Stanford	Pac-12	ACC
Texas	Big 12	SEC
UCLA	Pac-12	Big Ten
USC	Pac-12	Big Ten
Utah	Pac-12	Big 12
Washington	Pac-12	Big Ten

The 2024 season was the last for one team as an FBS independent.

School	Current conference	Future conference
UMass	Independent (FBS)	MAC

Two FCS schools, Delaware and Missouri State, started transitioning their programs to FBS in the 2024 season. The two schools respectively played that season in CAA Football and the Missouri Valley Football Conference, but were not eligible for the FCS playoffs due to NCAA transition rules. Both joined CUSA in 2025.

School	Current conference	Future conference
Delaware	CAA Football (FCS)	CUSA
Missouri State	Missouri Valley (FCS)	CUSA

On September 12, 2024, the Pac-12 announced that MW members Boise State, Colorado State, Fresno State, and San Diego State would join the Pac-12 in 2026. On September 24, 2024, the Pac-12 announced that another MW member, Utah State, would also join alongside the four aforementioned schools in 2026. This will bring the Pac-12 to seven members, one short of the number needed to preserve its status as an FBS conference. (Note: Gonzaga, which also joins the Pac-12 in 2026, does not count toward the required eight members because it lacks a football program.) On October 1, 2024, UTEP announced that it would join the Mountain West from Conference USA starting in 2026. This gave the MW seven full football-sponsoring members in the 2026 season; it had to add at least one more such member no later than 2028–29 to preserve its FBS status. The needed eighth member proved to be current football-only member Hawaii. On October 14, Hawaii athletic director Craig Angelos confirmed outside reports that the school would upgrade to full MW membership in 2026. The MW officially announced this move the next day. On January 7, 2025, the Mountain West got a ninth member in Mid-American Conference member Northern Illinois joining as a football-only affiliate.

== Rule changes ==
The following rule changes were approved by the NCAA Playing Rules Oversight Panel for the 2024 season:

- Implementing a timeout at the first dead ball on or after the two-minute mark of the second and fourth quarters (similar to the NFL's two-minute warning). The following timing rules were synchronized to start after the two-minute timeout:
  - Stopping the game clock when the offense gains a first down inbounds, then restarting after the chains are set.
  - Situations where a 10-second runoff is required will now begin after the two-minute timeout instead of in the final minute of each half, mirroring an NFL rule change since 2017.
  - If the defense commits an illegal substitution foul where 12 or more players participated in the down, in addition to the yardage penalty, the offense has the option to have the game clock reset to the time remaining before the snap. If the 12th player was in the process of leaving the field and not participating when the ball was snapped, the penalty enforcement will not include the clock reset option. This in-season change was a result of the Oregon Ducks using this tactic in the final 10 seconds of their game with the Ohio State Buckeyes on October 12.
- Allowing use of coach-to-player communications via the helmet for one player (indicated by a green dot on the helmet), which would be turned off either with 15 seconds on the play clock or when the ball is snapped, whichever occurs first.
- The use of up to 18 tablets per team on the sidelines for in-game video only is now permitted.
- Team personnel (player/coach/assistant/etc.) who enter the field to engage officials with a tablet to review video of a play(s) are assessed an automatic unsportsmanlike conduct (15 yards) penalty which counts toward their limit of two before ejection.
- Division III adopted the first down timing rules that were implemented for FBS, FCS, and Division II in the 2023 season.
- Allowing conferences to use a collaborative instant replay system as a regular (instead of an experimental) rule.
- Horse-collar tackles within the tackle box are now penalized as a personal foul (15 yards). Previously this action was not penalized within the tackle box.
- Head coaches are permitted to be interviewed by the media at the end of the first and third quarters, making permanent an experimental rule.
- Once the referee declares the first half ended, no replay reviews for that half are permitted.
- Commercial sponsor logos are permitted on three areas of the playing field.
- Any "hide-out" play, with or without a substitution, is considered a team unsportsmanlike conduct penalty (15 yards).

Points of emphasis for the 2024 season include:

- Continued emphasis on targeting, taunting, concussions, feigning injuries, and low hits to the quarterback.
- Pre-snap actions (false start on offense, and disconcerting signals/causing the offense to false start) continue to be a point of emphasis, including editorial changes that if a defensive player is lined up within one yard of the line of scrimmage, he may not rush the line with the intent of causing a false start, and that any movement by the offense that simulates action will be a false start.
- Offensive alignment, including attention to eligible receivers being covered up by another player and other "gadget plays", will be strictly enforced.

== Headlines ==
- January 25, 2024 – The Mid-American Conference announced that it would eliminate its football divisions, effective immediately. The championship game will instead involve the top two teams in the conference standings.
- April 22 – The NCAA Division I Board of Directors announced the following:
  - Effective immediately, all student-athletes who meet certain academic requirements will be immediately eligible when transferring to a new school, regardless of whether they had transferred before. Previously, all transfers after the first, except for graduate transfers, required that the student-athlete receive an NCAA waiver in order to be immediately eligible.
  - Also effective immediately, schools will be allowed to directly assist their athletes in reaching name, image, and likeness deals.
  - After the end of the Pac-12 Conference's operating year on August 1, the conference was officially removed from autonomy status, effectively turning the Power Five conferences into a Power Four.
- June 25 – The NCAA Division I Council announced the following:
  - Effective immediately, all members of a team's staff can provide coaching services. While this effectively lifts most limits on the size of coaching staffs, it does not change limits on the number of coaches who can recruit off-campus, graduate assistants, or strength and conditioning coaches.
  - Also effective immediately, cannabinoids were removed from the list of banned drugs in football. Penalties being served by student-athletes who had tested positive for cannabinoids were ended.
  - The Council voted to introduce a proposal that would reduce the duration of the transfer portal in football and basketball from 45 days to 30. A final vote was expected in October.
- August 27:
  - The oversight committees for FBS and FCS recommended that the transfer portal be open only for a 30-day period, starting on the Monday after conference championship games. This will not affect the existing exceptions for participants in postseason games, which allows players to enter the portal within a 5-day window after their team's final game, or players undergoing a coaching change. The Division I Council voted on the change in October.
  - Both oversight committees also approved a change to redshirt rules. Effective immediately, the participation limit of four games for redshirting players no longer includes postseason games — conference championship games, bowls, FCS playoff games, and College Football Playoff games.
- October 9:
  - The Division I Council approved the recommended reduction of the FBS and FCS transfer portal to 30 days, though with a different schedule than recommended. The fall window, which opens on the Monday after the FBS conference championship games, will be open only for 20 days. A 10-day spring portal will open in mid-April.
  - The council also abolished the National Letter of Intent program effective immediately. Written offers of athletics aid will replace the NLI.

== Stadiums ==
- Due to stadium renovations at David Booth Kansas Memorial Stadium, the Kansas Jayhawks played two home games at Children's Mercy Park in Kansas City, Kansas, and four home games at Arrowhead Stadium in Kansas City, Missouri.
- Due to the demolition of Ryan Field, with a new stadium of the same name set to open on the site in 2026, the Northwestern Wildcats played five home games at temporary constructed Martin Stadium in Evanston, Illinois, and two home games at Wrigley Field in Chicago.
- July 16 – Jacksonville State announced that Birmingham-based credit union AmFirst had purchased the naming rights to JSU's stadium, now known as AmFirst Stadium, for a five-year deal.
- August 6 – FIU announced that Miami-based rapper Pitbull had purchased the naming rights to the Panthers' stadium, now known as Pitbull Stadium. The $6 million contract runs for 5 years, with Pitbull having an option to renew for an additional 5 years.
- September 7 – During halftime of the Week 2 game between the Alabama Crimson Tide and the South Florida Bulls, the playing field inside Bryant–Denny Stadium – home of the Crimson Tide – was renamed Saban Field at Bryant–Denny Stadium in honor of Nick Saban, who coached Alabama for the past 17 seasons.

== Kickoff games ==
=== Week 0 ===
The regular season began on Saturday, August 24 with four games in Week 0.

- Aer Lingus College Football Classic:
  - Georgia Tech 24, No. 10 Florida State 21 (at Aviva Stadium, Dublin, Ireland)
- Montana State 35, New Mexico 31
- SMU 29, Nevada 24
- Hawaii 35, Delaware State 14

=== Week 1 ===
- Aflac Kickoff Game:
  - No. 1 Georgia 34, No. 14 Clemson 3 (at Mercedes-Benz Stadium, Atlanta, Georgia)
- Vegas Kickoff Classic:
  - No. 23 USC 27, No. 13 LSU 20 (at Allegiant Stadium, Paradise, Nevada)

=== Week 2 ===
- Duke's Mayo Classic:
  - No. 14 Tennessee 51, No. 24 NC State 10 (at Bank of America Stadium, Charlotte, North Carolina)

== Top 10 matchups ==
Rankings through Week 10 reflect the AP poll. Rankings for Week 11 and beyond list College Football Playoff Rankings first and AP poll rankings second; teams that were not ranked in the top 10 of both polls are noted.

=== Regular season ===
- Week 2
  - No. 3 Texas defeated No. 10 Michigan, 31–12 (Michigan Stadium, Ann Arbor, Michigan)
- Week 5
  - No. 4 Alabama defeated No. 2 Georgia, 41–34 (Bryant–Denny Stadium, Tuscaloosa, Alabama)
- Week 7
  - No. 3 Oregon defeated No. 2 Ohio State, 32–31 (Autzen Stadium, Eugene, Oregon)
- Week 8
  - No. 5 Georgia defeated No. 1 Texas, 30–15 (Darrell K Royal–Texas Memorial Stadium, Austin, Texas)
- Week 10
  - No. 4 Ohio State defeated No. 3 Penn State, 20–13 (Beaver Stadium, University Park, Pennsylvania)
- Week 13
  - No. 2/2 Ohio State defeated No. 5/5 Indiana, 38–15 (Ohio Stadium, Columbus, Ohio)

=== Conference championship games ===
- No. 5/5 Georgia defeated No. 2/2 Texas, 22–19 ^{OT} (2024 SEC Championship Game, Mercedes-Benz Stadium, Atlanta, Georgia)
- No. 1/1 Oregon defeated No. 3/3 Penn State, 45–37 (2024 Big Ten Football Championship Game, Lucas Oil Stadium, Indianapolis, Indiana)

=== Postseason ===
- CFP First Round (Dec. 20)
  - No. 3/5 Notre Dame defeated No. 9/8 Indiana, 27–17 (Notre Dame Stadium - Notre Dame, Indiana)
- CFP First Round (Dec. 21)
  - No. 3 Texas defeated No. 16 Clemson, 38-24 (DKR-Texas Memorial Stadium - Austin, Texas)
- CFP First Round (Dec. 21)
  - No. 6 Ohio State defeated No. 7 Tennessee, 42–17 (Ohio Stadium - Columbus, Ohio)
- CFP First Round (Dec. 21)
  - No. 4/5 Penn State defeated No. 10/12 SMU, 38–10 (Beaver Stadium - University Park, Pennsylvania)
- Fiesta Bowl (CFB Playoff quarterfinal)
  - No. 4/5 Penn State defeated No. 8/9 Boise State, 31–14 (State Farm Stadium - Glendale, Arizona)
- Peach Bowl (CFB Playoff quarterfinal)
  - No. 4/5 Texas defeated No. 10/12 Arizona State, 39–31 ^{2OT} (Mercedes-Benz Stadium - Atlanta, Georgia)
- Rose Bowl (CFB Playoff quarterfinal)
  - No. 6 Ohio State defeated No. 1 Oregon 41–21 (Rose Bowl - Pasadena, California)
- Sugar Bowl (CFB Playoff quarterfinal)
  - No. 3/5 Notre Dame defeated No. 2 Georgia 23–10 (Caesars Superdome - New Orleans, Louisiana)
- Cotton Bowl (CFB Playoff semifinal)
  - No. 6 Ohio State defeated No. 4/5 Texas 28–14 (AT&T Stadium - Arlington, Texas)
- Orange Bowl (CFB Playoff semifinal)
  - No. 3/5 Notre Dame defeated No. 4/5 Penn State 27–24 (Hard Rock Stadium - Miami Gardens, Florida)
- CFB Playoff National Championship Game
  - No. 6 Ohio State defeated No. 3/5 Notre Dame, 34–23 (Mercedes-Benz Stadium - Atlanta, Georgia)

== FCS team wins over FBS teams ==
Italics denotes FCS teams.

Date	Visiting team	Home team	Site	Result	Attendance	Ref.
August 24	No. 4 (FCS) Montana State	New Mexico	University Stadium • Albuquerque, New Mexico	35–31 (Note: Montana State was a 13.5-point favorite at kickoff.)	17,314	
September 7	Saint Francis (PA)	Kent State	Dix Stadium • Kent, Ohio	23–17	11,585	
September 7	No. 7 (FCS) Idaho	Wyoming	War Memorial Stadium • Laramie, Wyoming	17–13	25,070	
September 7	Southern Utah	UTEP	Sun Bowl • El Paso, Texas	27–24 ^{OT}	41,609	
September 21	Monmouth	FIU	Pitbull Stadium • Miami, Florida	45–42	17,922	
September 28	UT Martin	Kennesaw State	Fifth Third Stadium • Kennesaw, Georgia	24–13	10,847	
^{#}Rankings from AP Poll released prior to game.

== Upsets ==
This section lists unranked teams defeating AP Poll-ranked during the season.

=== Regular season ===
- August 24, 2024
  - Georgia Tech 24, No. 10 Florida State 21
- September 2, 2024
  - Boston College 28, No. 10 Florida State 13
- September 7, 2024
  - Northern Illinois 16, No. 5 Notre Dame 14
  - Illinois 23, No. 19 Kansas 17
  - Iowa State 20, No. 21 Iowa 19
  - Syracuse 31, No. 23 Georgia Tech 28
- September 21, 2024
  - BYU 38, No. 13 Kansas State 9
  - Buffalo 23, No. 23 Northern Illinois 20 ^{OT}
- September 28, 2024
  - Kentucky 20, No. 6 Ole Miss 17
  - Arizona 23, No. 10 Utah 10
- October 4, 2024
  - Syracuse 44, No. 25 UNLV 41 ^{OT}
- October 5, 2024
  - Vanderbilt 40, No. 1 Alabama 35
  - Arkansas 19, No. 4 Tennessee 14
  - Washington 27, No. 10 Michigan 17
  - Minnesota 24, No. 11 USC 17
  - SMU 34, No. 22 Louisville 27
- October 11, 2024
  - Arizona State 27, No. 16 Utah 19
- November 2, 2024
  - South Carolina 44, No. 10 Texas A&M 20
  - Louisville 33, No. 11т Clemson 21
  - Texas Tech 23, No. 11т Iowa State 22
  - Houston 24, No. 17 Kansas State 19
  - Minnesota 25, No. 24 Illinois 17
- November 9, 2024
  - Georgia Tech 28, No. 4 Miami (FL) 23
  - Kansas 45, No. 17 Iowa State 36
  - Virginia 24, No. 23 Pittsburgh 19
  - South Carolina 28, No. 24 Vanderbilt 7
- November 16, 2024
  - Kansas 17, No. 7 BYU 13
  - New Mexico 38, No. 19 Washington State 35
  - Arizona State 24, No. 20 Kansas State 14
  - Florida 27, No. 21 LSU 16
  - Stanford 38, No. 22 Louisville 35
- November 23, 2024
  - Oklahoma 24, No. 7 Alabama 3
  - Florida 24, No. 9 Ole Miss 17
  - Auburn 43, No. 15 Texas A&M 41 ^{4OT}
  - Kansas 37, No. 16 Colorado 21
  - Oregon State 41, No. 25 Washington State 38
- November 28, 2024
  - Memphis 34, No. 18 Tulane 24
- November 30, 2024
  - Michigan 13, No. 2 Ohio State 10
  - Syracuse 42, No. 8 Miami (FL) 38
- December 14, 2024
  - Navy 31, No. 19 Army 13

=== Postseason ===
- December 31, 2024
  - Michigan 19, No. 11 Alabama 13 (ReliaQuest Bowl)

== Conference standings ==
2024 American Athletic Conference football standings
	Conf.			Overall
Team	W		L	W		L
No. 21 Army y$	8	–	0	12	–	2
Tulane y	7	–	1	9	–	5
Navy	6	–	2	10	–	3
No. 24 Memphis	6	–	2	11	–	2
East Carolina	5	–	3	8	–	5
South Florida	4	–	4	7	–	6
UTSA	4	–	4	7	–	6
Charlotte	4	–	4	5	–	7
North Texas	3	–	5	6	–	7
Rice	3	–	5	4	–	8
Temple	2	–	6	3	–	9
UAB	2	–	6	3	–	9
Florida Atlantic	1	–	7	3	–	9
Tulsa	1	–	7	3	–	9
Championship: Army 35, Tulane 14
$ – Conference champion; y – Championship game participant; Rankings from AP Poll

2024 Atlantic Coast Conference football standings
	Conf.			Overall
Team	W		L	W		L
No. 12 SMU y^	8	–	0	11	–	3
No. 14 Clemson y$^	7	–	1	10	–	4
No. 18 Miami (FL)	6	–	2	10	–	3
No. 20 Syracuse	5	–	3	10	–	3
Duke	5	–	3	9	–	4
Louisville	5	–	3	9	–	4
Georgia Tech	5	–	3	7	–	6
Boston College	4	–	4	7	–	6
Virginia Tech	4	–	4	6	–	7
Pittsburgh	3	–	5	7	–	6
NC State	3	–	5	6	–	7
North Carolina	3	–	5	6	–	7
Virginia	3	–	5	5	–	7
California	2	–	6	6	–	7
Wake Forest	2	–	6	4	–	8
Stanford	2	–	6	3	–	9
Florida State	1	–	7	2	–	10
Championship: Clemson 34, SMU 31
^ – College Football Playoff participant; $ – Conference champion; y – Championship game participant; Rankings from AP Poll

2024 Big Ten Conference football standings
	Conf.			Overall
Team	W		L	W		L
No. 3 Oregon y$^	9	–	0	13	–	1
No. 10 Indiana ^	8	–	1	11	–	2
No. 5 Penn State y^	8	–	1	13	–	3
No. 1 Ohio State #^	7	–	2	14	–	2
No. 16 Illinois	6	–	3	10	–	3
Iowa	6	–	3	8	–	5
Michigan	5	–	4	8	–	5
Minnesota	5	–	4	8	–	5
USC	4	–	5	7	–	6
Rutgers	4	–	5	7	–	6
Washington	4	–	5	6	–	7
Nebraska	3	–	6	7	–	6
UCLA	3	–	6	5	–	7
Wisconsin	3	–	6	5	–	7
Northwestern	2	–	7	4	–	8
Maryland	1	–	8	4	–	8
Michigan State†	0	–	6	0	–	7
Purdue	0	–	9	1	–	11
Championship: Oregon 45, Penn State 37
# – College Football Playoff champion; ^ – College Football Playoff participant; $ – Conference champion; y – Championship game participant; † — NCAA vacated all wins for Michigan State (5–7, 3–6); Rankings from AP Poll

2024 Big 12 Conference football standings
	Conf.			Overall
Team	W		L	W		L
No. 7 Arizona State y$^	7	–	2	11	–	3
No. 15 Iowa State y	7	–	2	11	–	3
No. 13 BYU	7	–	2	11	–	2
No. 25 Colorado	7	–	2	9	–	4
Baylor	6	–	3	8	–	5
TCU	6	–	3	9	–	4
Texas Tech	6	–	3	8	–	5
Kansas State	5	–	4	9	–	4
West Virginia	5	–	4	6	–	7
Kansas	4	–	5	5	–	7
Cincinnati	3	–	6	5	–	7
Houston	3	–	6	4	–	8
Utah	2	–	7	5	–	7
UCF	2	–	7	4	–	8
Arizona	2	–	7	4	–	8
Oklahoma State	0	–	9	3	–	9
Championship: Arizona State 45, Iowa State 19
^ – College Football Playoff participant; $ – Conference champion; y – Championship game participant; Rankings from AP Poll

2024 Conference USA football standings
	Conf.			Overall
Team	W		L	W		L
Jacksonville State y$	7	–	1	9	–	5
Western Kentucky y	6	–	2	8	–	6
Sam Houston	6	–	2	10	–	3
Liberty	5	–	3	8	–	4
Louisiana Tech	4	–	4	5	–	8
UTEP	3	–	5	3	–	9
FIU	3	–	5	4	–	8
New Mexico State	2	–	6	3	–	9
Middle Tennessee	2	–	6	3	–	9
Kennesaw State*	2	–	6	2	–	10
Championship: Jacksonville State 52, Western Kentucky 12
$ – Conference champion; y – Championship game participant; * – Ineligible for postseason play due to FCS-to-FBS transition rules

2024 Mid-American Conference football standings
	Conf.			Overall
Team	W		L	W		L
Ohio y$	7	–	1	11	–	3
Miami (OH) y	7	–	1	9	–	5
Buffalo	6	–	2	9	–	4
Bowling Green	6	–	2	7	–	6
Western Michigan	5	–	3	6	–	7
Toledo	4	–	4	8	–	5
Northern Illinois	4	–	4	8	–	5
Akron	3	–	5	4	–	8
Eastern Michigan	2	–	6	5	–	7
Central Michigan	2	–	6	4	–	8
Ball State	2	–	6	3	–	9
Kent State	0	–	8	0	–	12
Championship: Ohio 38, Miami (OH) 3
$ – Conference champion; y – Championship game participant

2024 Mountain West Conference football standings
	Conf.			Overall
Team	W		L	W		L
No. 8 Boise State y$^	7	–	0	12	–	2
No. 23 UNLV y	6	–	1	11	–	3
Colorado State	6	–	1	8	–	5
Fresno State	4	–	3	6	–	7
San Jose State	3	–	4	7	–	6
Air Force	3	–	4	5	–	7
Hawaii	3	–	4	5	–	7
New Mexico	3	–	4	5	–	7
Utah State	3	–	4	4	–	8
San Diego State	2	–	5	3	–	9
Wyoming	2	–	5	3	–	9
Nevada	0	–	7	3	–	10
Championship: Boise State 21, UNLV 7
^ – College Football Playoff participant; $ – Conference champion; y – Championship game participant; Rankings from AP Poll

2024 Pac-12 Conference football standings
	Conf.			Overall
Team	W		L	W		L
Oregon State	1	–	0	5	–	7
Washington State	0	–	1	8	–	5

2024 Southeastern Conference football standings
	Conf.			Overall
Team	W		L	W		L
No. 4 Texas y^	7	–	1	13	–	3
No. 6 Georgia y$^	6	–	2	11	–	3
No. 9 Tennessee ^	6	–	2	10	–	3
No. 22 Missouri	5	–	3	10	–	3
No. 11 Ole Miss	5	–	3	10	–	3
No. 17 Alabama	5	–	3	9	–	4
No. 19 South Carolina	5	–	3	9	–	4
LSU	5	–	3	9	–	4
Texas A&M	5	–	3	8	–	5
Florida	4	–	4	8	–	5
Arkansas	3	–	5	7	–	6
Vanderbilt	3	–	5	7	–	6
Oklahoma	2	–	6	6	–	7
Auburn	2	–	6	5	–	7
Kentucky	1	–	7	4	–	8
Mississippi State	0	–	8	2	–	10
Championship: Georgia 22, Texas 19 ^{OT}
^ – College Football Playoff participant; $ – Conference champion; y – Championship game participant; Rankings from AP Poll

2024 Sun Belt Conference football standings
	Conf.			Overall
Team	W		L	W		L
East Division
Marshall xy$	7	–	1	10	–	3
Georgia Southern	6	–	2	8	–	5
James Madison	4	–	4	9	–	4
Old Dominion	4	–	4	5	–	7
Coastal Carolina	3	–	5	6	–	7
Appalachian State	3	–	5	5	–	6
Georgia State	1	–	7	3	–	9
West Division
Louisiana xy	7	–	1	10	–	4
Texas State	5	–	3	8	–	5
Arkansas State	5	–	3	8	–	5
South Alabama	5	–	3	7	–	6
Louisiana–Monroe	3	–	5	5	–	7
Troy	3	–	5	4	–	8
Southern Miss	0	–	8	1	–	11
Championship: Marshall 31, Louisiana 3
$ – Conference champion; x – Division champion/co-champions; y – Championship game participant

2024 NCAA Division I FBS independents football records
	Conf.			Overall
Team	W		L	W		L
No. 2 Notre Dame ^		–		14	–	2
UConn		–		9	–	4
UMass		–		2	–	10
^ – College Football Playoff participant; Rankings from AP Poll

== Rankings ==
The Top 25 from the AP and USA Today Coaches Polls

=== Preseason polls ===
AP
Ranking	Team
1	Georgia (46)
2	Ohio State (15)
3	Oregon (1)
4	Texas
5	Alabama
6	Ole Miss
7	Notre Dame
8	Penn State
9	Michigan
10	Florida State
11	Missouri
12	Utah
13	LSU
14	Clemson
15	Tennessee
16	Oklahoma
17	Oklahoma State
18	Kansas State
19	Miami (FL)
20	Texas A&M
21	Arizona
22	Kansas
23	USC
24	NC State
25	Iowa

USA Today Coaches
Ranking	Team
1	Georgia (46)
2	Ohio State (7)
3	Oregon
4	Texas (1)
5	Alabama
6	Ole Miss
7	Notre Dame
8	Michigan (1)
9	Penn State
10	Florida State
11	Missouri
12	LSU
13	Utah
14	Clemson
15	Tennessee
16	Oklahoma
17	Kansas State
18	Oklahoma State
19	Miami (FL)
20	Texas A&M
21	Arizona
22	NC State
23	USC
24	Kansas
25	Iowa

=== CFB Playoff final rankings ===
On December 8, 2024, the College Football Playoff selection committee announced its final team rankings for the year. It was the eleventh season of the CFP era, and the first in which the playoff was expanded from four teams to twelve teams. The top five ranked conference champions were selected to compete, along with the seven highest ranked at-large teams. The top four conference champions received a first-round bye.

Rank	Team	W–L	Conference and standing	Bowl game
1	Oregon Ducks	13–0	Big Ten champions	Rose Bowl (CFP quarterfinal)
2	Georgia Bulldogs	11–2	SEC champions	Sugar Bowl (CFP quarterfinal)
3	Texas Longhorns	11–2	SEC first place	CFP first-round game
4	Penn State Nittany Lions	11–2	Big Ten second place (tie)	CFP first-round game
5	Notre Dame Fighting Irish	11–1	Independent	CFP first-round game
6	Ohio State Buckeyes	10–2	Big Ten fourth place	CFP first-round game
7	Tennessee Volunteers	10–2	SEC second place (tie)	CFP first-round game
8	Indiana Hoosiers	11–1	Big Ten second place (tie)	CFP first-round game
9	Boise State Broncos	12–1	Mountain West champions	Fiesta Bowl (CFP quarterfinal)
10	SMU Mustangs	11–2	ACC first place	CFP first-round game
11	Alabama Crimson Tide	9–3	SEC fourth place (tie)	ReliaQuest Bowl
12	Arizona State Sun Devils	11–2	Big 12 champions	Peach Bowl (CFP quarterfinal)
13	Miami Hurricanes	10–2	ACC third place	Pop-Tarts Bowl
14	Ole Miss Rebels	9–3	SEC fourth place (tie)	Gator Bowl
15	South Carolina Gamecocks	9–3	SEC fourth place (tie)	Citrus Bowl
16	Clemson Tigers	10–3	ACC champions	CFP first-round game
17	BYU Cougars	10–2	Big 12 first place (tie)	Alamo Bowl
18	Iowa State Cyclones	10–3	Big 12 first place (tie)	Pop-Tarts Bowl
19	Missouri Tigers	9–3	SEC fourth place (tie)	Music City Bowl
20	Illinois Fighting Illini	9–3	Big Ten fifth place (tie)	Citrus Bowl
21	Syracuse Orange	9–3	ACC fourth place (tie)	Holiday Bowl
22	Army Black Knights	11–1	AAC champions	Independence Bowl
23	Colorado Buffaloes	9–3	Big 12 first place (tie)	Alamo Bowl
24	UNLV Rebels	10–3	Mountain West second place (tie)	LA Bowl
25	Memphis Tigers	10–2	AAC third place (tie)	Frisco Bowl

=== Final rankings ===
Rank	Associated Press	Coaches' Poll
1	Ohio State (56)	Ohio State (53)
2	Notre Dame	Notre Dame
3	Oregon	Texas
4	Texas	Oregon
5	Penn State	Penn State
6	Georgia	Georgia
7	Arizona State	Arizona State
8	Boise State	Tennessee
9	Tennessee	Boise State
10	Indiana	Indiana
11	Ole Miss	Clemson; SMU (tied)
12	SMU	Clemson; SMU (tied)
13	BYU	Ole Miss
14	Clemson	BYU
15	Iowa State	Iowa State
16	Illinois	Illinois
17	Alabama	Alabama
18	Miami (FL)	Miami (FL)
19	South Carolina	South Carolina
20	Syracuse	Missouri
21	Army	Army
22	Missouri	Syracuse
23	UNLV	Memphis
24	Memphis	UNLV
25	Colorado	Colorado

== Playoff qualifiers ==
=== Participants ===
Team	Conference	Record	Qualification method	College Football Playoff		
Team	Conference	Record	Qualification method	Appearance	Last bid	Result of last appearance
Arizona State	Big 12 Conference	11–2 (7–2)	Conference champion	First appearance		
Boise State	Mountain West Conference	12–1 (7–0)	Conference champion	First appearance		
Clemson	Atlantic Coast Conference	10–3 (7–1)	Conference champion	7th	2020	Lost to Ohio State in the semifinals
Georgia	Southeastern Conference	11–2 (6–2)	Conference champion	4th	2022	**Won National Championship** against TCU
Indiana	Big Ten Conference	11–1 (8–1)	At-large	First appearance		
Notre Dame	Independent	11–1	At-large	3rd	2020	Lost to Alabama in the semifinals
Ohio State	Big Ten Conference	10–2 (7–2)	At-large	6th	2022	Lost to Georgia in the semifinals
Oregon	Big Ten Conference	13–0 (9–0)	Conference champion	2nd	2014	Lost to Ohio State in the National Championship
Penn State	Big Ten Conference	11–2 (8–1)	At-large	First appearance		
SMU	Atlantic Coast Conference	11–2 (8–0)	At-large	First appearance		
Tennessee	Southeastern Conference	10–2 (6–2)	At-large	First appearance		
Texas	Southeastern Conference	11–2 (7–1)	At-large	2nd	2023	Lost to Washington in the semifinals

=== College Football Playoff bracket ===
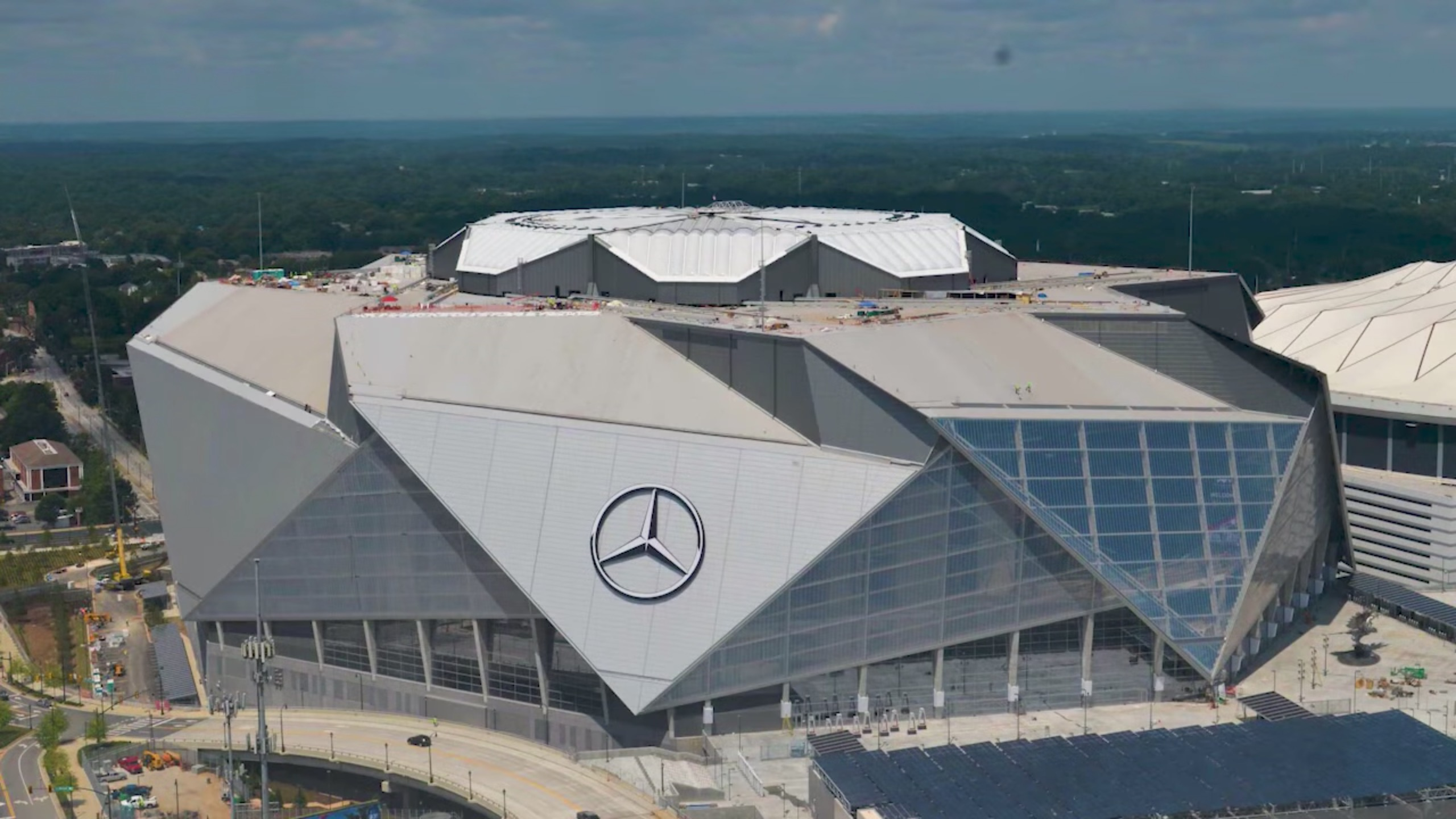
Mercedes-Benz Stadium in Atlanta, Georgia, hosted the championship game.

Locations of the 12 playoff participants (teams in bold received byes to the quarterfinals)
Big Ten, SEC, ACC, Big 12, Mountain West, Independent
Locations of the playoff games: campus site first round games (green), quarterfinals (blue), semifinals (red), and the national championship (black)

This is the first year under the expanded College Football Playoff format. Under this format, the five highest-ranked conference champions will receive automatic bids, while the next seven highest-ranked teams will receive at-large bids. The four highest-ranked conference champions will receive a first-round bye in the playoff.

First round
Dec 21 – Ohio Stadium
**8**	**Ohio State**	**42**
9	Tennessee	17
Dec 21 – DKR–Texas Memorial Stadium
**5**	**Texas**	**38**
12	Clemson	24
Dec 20 – Notre Dame Stadium
**7**	**Notre Dame**	**27**
10	Indiana	17
Dec 21 – Beaver Stadium
**6**	**Penn State**	**38**
11	SMU	10

Quarterfinals
Jan 1 – Rose Bowl, Rose Bowl
1	Oregon	21
**8**	**Ohio State**	**41**
Jan 1 – Peach Bowl, Mercedes-Benz Stadium
4	Arizona State	31
**5**	**Texas (2OT)**	**39**
Jan 2 – Sugar Bowl, Caesars Superdome
2	Georgia	10
**7**	**Notre Dame**	**23**
Dec 31 – Fiesta Bowl, State Farm Stadium
3	Boise State	14
**6**	**Penn State**	**31**

Semifinals
Jan 10 – Cotton Bowl Classic, AT&T Stadium
**8**	**Ohio State**	**28**
5	Texas	14
Jan 9 – Orange Bowl, Hard Rock Stadium
**7**	**Notre Dame**	**27**
6	Penn State	24

Championship
Jan 20 – Mercedes-Benz Stadium
**8**	**Ohio State**	**34**
7	Notre Dame	23

== Postseason ==
Normally, a team is required to have a .500 minimum winning percentage during the regular season to become bowl-eligible (six wins for an 11- or 12-game schedule, and seven wins for a 13-game schedule). If there are not enough winning teams to fulfill all open bowl slots, teams with losing records may be chosen to fill available bowl slots. Additionally, on the rare occasion in which a conference champion does not meet eligibility requirements, they are usually still chosen for bowl games via tie-ins for their conference.

=== Bowl eligibility ===
- ACC (13): Boston College, California, Clemson, Duke, Georgia Tech, Louisville, Miami (FL), NC State, North Carolina, Pittsburgh, SMU, Syracuse, Virginia Tech
- American (8): Army, East Carolina, Memphis, Navy, North Texas, South Florida, Tulane, UTSA
- Big Ten (12): Illinois, Indiana, Iowa, Michigan, Minnesota, Nebraska, Ohio State, Oregon, Penn State, Rutgers, USC, Washington
- Big 12 (9): Arizona State, Baylor, BYU, Colorado, Iowa State, Kansas State, TCU, Texas Tech, West Virginia
- CUSA (4): Jacksonville State, Liberty, Sam Houston, Western Kentucky
- MAC (7): Bowling Green, Buffalo, Miami (OH), Northern Illinois, Ohio, Toledo, Western Michigan
- Mountain West (5): Boise State, Colorado State, Fresno State, San Jose State, UNLV
- Pac-12 (1): Washington State
- SEC (13): Alabama, Arkansas, Florida, Georgia, LSU, Missouri, Oklahoma, Ole Miss, South Carolina, Tennessee, Texas, Texas A&M, Vanderbilt
- Sun Belt (8): Arkansas State, Coastal Carolina, Georgia Southern, James Madison, Louisiana, Marshall, (Note: Marshall withdrew from the Independence Bowl due to a large number of players entering the NCAA transfer portal.) South Alabama, Texas State
- Independent (2): Notre Dame, UConn

Number of postseason berths available: 82 (Note: There were 35 traditional season-ending bowl games providing berths for 70 teams. The CFP placed 12 teams into a bracket tournament (8 teams in first-round games, and 4 teams directly into quarterfinal games). Thus, a total of 82 teams (70 + 12) fulfilled these postseason competitions.)
Number of bowl-eligible teams: 82
Note: Although the Sun Belt had eight bowl-eligible teams, Marshall (10–3) withdrew from the Independence Bowl and was subsequently replaced by Louisiana Tech (5–7) of Conference USA. Thus, the resulting bowl count for the Sun Belt was seven, and for Conference USA was five.

- ACC (4): Florida State, Stanford, Virginia, Wake Forest
- American (6): Charlotte, Florida Atlantic, Rice, Temple, Tulsa, UAB
- Big Ten (6): Maryland, Michigan State, Northwestern, Purdue, UCLA, Wisconsin
- Big 12 (7): Arizona, Cincinnati, Houston, Kansas, Oklahoma State, UCF, Utah
- CUSA (6): FIU, Kennesaw State, (Note: Kennesaw State was bowl ineligible due to their transition from FCS to FBS; having posted a losing record, the Owls were bowl ineligible regardless.) Louisiana Tech, (Note: Louisiana Tech was named as a participant in the Independence Bowl following the withdrawal of Marshall.) Middle Tennessee, New Mexico State, UTEP
- MAC (5): Akron, Ball State, Central Michigan, Eastern Michigan, Kent State
- Mountain West (7): Air Force, Hawaii, (Note: Hawaii had two wins against FCS teams, Delaware State and Northern Iowa. Only one win against an FCS school may be counted towards bowl eligibility. However, with a losing record, the Rainbow Warriors were bowl ineligible regardless.) Nevada, New Mexico, San Diego State, Utah State, Wyoming
- Pac-12 (1): Oregon State
- SEC (3): Auburn, Kentucky, Mississippi State
- Sun Belt (6): Appalachian State, Georgia State, Louisiana–Monroe, Old Dominion, Southern Miss, Troy
- Independent (1): UMass (Note: UMass had two wins against FCS teams, Central Connecticut and Wagner. Only one win against an FCS school may be counted towards bowl eligibility. However, with a losing record, the Minutemen were bowl ineligible regardless.)

Number of bowl-ineligible teams: 52

=== Conference summaries ===
Rankings in this section are based on CFP rankings released prior to the games (Week 13–December 3).

Note: Clicking on a link in the Conference column will open an article about that conference's championship game, where applicable.

Conference	Championship game				Players of the year				Coach of the year
Conference	Date	Venue (Location)	Matchup	Result	Overall/MVP	Offensive	Defensive	Special teams	Coach of the year
ACC	Dec 7	Bank of America Stadium (Charlotte, North Carolina)	No. 8 SMU vs. No. 17 Clemson	Clemson 34–31	Cam Ward, QB, Miami	Cam Ward, QB, Miami	Donovan Ezeiruaku, DE, Boston College	—N/a	Rhett Lashlee, SMU
American	Dec 6	Michie Stadium (West Point, New York)	Tulane at No. 24 Army	Army 35–14	—N/a	Bryson Daily, QB, Army	Jimmori Robinson, LB, UTSA	Jonah Delange, K UAB	Jeff Monken, Army
Big Ten	Dec 7	Lucas Oil Stadium (Indianapolis, Indiana)	No. 1 Oregon vs. No. 3 Penn State	Oregon 45–37	—N/a	Dillon Gabriel, QB, Oregon	Abdul Carter, DE, Penn State	Dominic Zvada, PK, Michigan; Eddie Czaplicki, P, USC; & Kaden Wetjen, RS, Iowa	Curt Cignetti, Indiana (coaches & media)
Big 12	Dec 7	AT&T Stadium (Arlington, Texas)	No. 15 Arizona State vs. No. 16 Iowa State	Arizona State 45–19	—N/a	Shedeur Sanders, QB, Colorado	Travis Hunter, DB, Colorado	Will Ferrin, K, BYU; Jaylin Noel, PR/KR, Iowa State	Kenny Dillingham, Arizona State
CUSA	Dec 6	Burgess–Snow Field at JSU Stadium (Jacksonville, Alabama)	Western Kentucky at Jacksonville State	Jacksonville State 52–12	Tyler Huff, QB, Jacksonville	Caden Veltkamp, QB, Western Kentucky	Travion Barnes, LB, FIU	Lucas Carneiro, PK, Western Kentucky	Rich Rodriguez, Jacksonville State
MAC	Dec 7	Ford Field (Detroit, Michigan)	Miami (OH) vs. Ohio	Ohio 38–3	—N/a	Harold Fannin Jr., TE, Bowling Green	Shaun Dolac, LB, Buffalo	Malcolm Gillie, KR, Ball State	Tim Albin, Ohio
MW	Dec 6	Albertsons Stadium (Boise, Idaho)	No. 20 UNLV at No. 10 Boise State	Boise State 21–7	—N/a	Ashton Jeanty, RB, Boise State	Jackson Woodard, LB, UNLV	Ricky White III, WR, UNLV	Spencer Danielson, Boise State
Pac-12†	—N/a	—N/a	—N/a	—N/a	—N/a	John Mateer, QB, Washington State	Taariq Al-Uqdah, LB, Washington State	Dean Janikowski, P/K, Washington State	—N/a
SEC	Dec 7	Mercedes-Benz Stadium (Atlanta, Georgia)	No. 5 Georgia vs. No. 2 Texas	Georgia 22–19 ^{(OT)}	—N/a	Dylan Sampson, RB, Tennessee	Kyle Kennard, DE, South Carolina	Alex Raynor, PK, Kentucky	Clark Lea, Vanderbilt
Sun Belt	Dec 7	Cajun Field (Lafayette, Louisiana)	Marshall (East) at Louisiana (West)	Marshall 31–3	Mike Green, DL Marshall	Ben Wooldridge, QB, Louisiana	Marques Watson-Trent, LB, Georgia Southern	—N/a	Michael Desormeaux, Louisiana

† The Pac-12, which played the season with two teams, named "top performers"—in addition to the three players noted in the table, also recognized were offensive lineman Gerad Christian-Lichtenhan of Oregon State and defensive lineman Ansel Din-Mbuh of Washington State.

=== Conference champions' bowl games ===
For conference champions not part of the College Football Playoff.

Conference	Champion	W–L	Rank	Bowl game
American	Army	11–1		Independence Bowl
Sun Belt	Marshall	10–3		Not participating (Note: Marshall was originally selected to participate in the Independence Bowl, but withdrew due to a high number of players entering the transfer portal following head coach Charles Huff's departure for the Southern Miss coaching vacancy.)
CUSA	Jacksonville State	9–4		Cure Bowl
MAC	Ohio	10–3		Cure Bowl

=== At-large bowl games ===
At-Large Teams
School	Conference	Record	Result	Bowl game
Western Kentucky	Conference USA	8–5	**L** 17–27	Boca Raton
Miami (OH)	MAC	8–5	**W** 43-17	Arizona Bowl
Tulane	American	9–4	**L** 8-33	Gasparilla Bowl
UNLV	Mountain West	10–3	**W** 24–13	LA Bowl
Iowa State	Big 12	10–3	**W** 42-41	Pop-Tarts Bowl
Louisiana	Sun Belt	10–3	**L** 3-34	New Mexico Bowl

=== Conference performance in bowl games ===
CFP bowl games are denoted in bold type. First-round CFP playoff games are included, and denoted as CFP1.

Conference	Games			Record	Win%	Bowls	
Conference	CFP	Other	Total	Record	Win%	Won	Lost
ACC	2	11	13	2–11	.154	Holiday, Sun	**CFP1** × 2, Birmingham, Duke's Mayo, Fenway, GameAbove Sports, Gator, LA, Military, Pinstripe, Pop-Tarts
American	0	8	8	6–2	.750	Armed Forces, Frisco, Hawaii, Independence, Military, Myrtle Beach	First Responder, Gasparilla
Big 12	1	8	9	4–5	.444	Alamo, New Mexico, Pop-Tarts, Rate	Alamo, Frisco, Liberty, **Peach**, Texas
Big Ten	8	9	17	11–6	.647	**CFP1** × 2, **Cotton**, Duke's Mayo, **Fiesta**, Las Vegas, Pinstripe, ReliaQuest, **Rose**, Citrus, **National Championship**	**CFP1**, Music City, **Orange**, Rate, **Rose**, Sun
CUSA	0	5	5	1–4	.200	New Orleans	Bahamas, Boca Raton, Cure, Independence
MAC	0	7	7	5–2	.714	Arizona, Bahamas, Cure, Famous Idaho Potato, GameAbove Sports	68 Ventures, Salute to Veterans
Mountain West	1	4	5	1–4	.200	LA	Arizona, Famous Idaho Potato, **Fiesta**, Hawaii
Pac-12	0	1	1	0–1	.000	—N/a	Holiday
SEC	5	10	15	8–7	.533	**CFP1**, Birmingham, Gasparilla, Gator, Liberty, Music City, **Peach**, Texas	**CFP1**, Armed Forces, Citrus, **Cotton**, Las Vegas, ReliaQuest, **Sugar**
Sun Belt	0	7	7	4–3	.571	68 Ventures, Boca Raton, First Responder, Salute to Veterans	Myrtle Beach, New Mexico, New Orleans
Independent	4	1	5	4–1	.800	**CFP1**, Fenway, **Orange**, **Sugar**	**National Championship**

Note: The Alamo Bowl was contested by two Big 12 teams (one was selected as a former Pac-12 member), while the Rose Bowl was contested by two Big Ten teams.

=== All-star games ===
Date	Time (EST)	Game	Site	Television	Participants	Results	Ref.
Dec 8, 2024	11:00 am	FCS Bowl	Municipal Stadium; Daytona Beach, Florida	Varsity Sports Network	American Team; National Team	**American 29**; National 0	
Jan 11, 2025	Noon	Hula Bowl	FBC Mortgage Stadium; Orlando, Florida (Note: The stadium has an Orlando mailing address, but is located in unincorporated Orange County.)	CBS Sports Network	Team Aina; Team Kai	**Aina 10**; Kai 3	
Jan 19, 2025	11:00 am	Tropical Bowl	Municipal Stadium; Daytona Beach, Florida	Varsity Sports Network	American Team; National Team	**American 17**; National 7	
Jan 30, 2025	8:00 pm	East–West Shrine Bowl	AT&T Stadium; Arlington, Texas	NFL Network	East Team; West Team	**East 25**; West 0	
Feb 1, 2025	2:30 pm	Senior Bowl	Hancock Whitney Stadium; Mobile, Alabama	NFL Network	American Team; National Team	**American 22**; National 19	
Feb 22, 2025	4:00 pm	HBCU Legacy Bowl	Yulman Stadium; New Orleans, Louisiana	NFL Network	Team Robinson; Team Gaither	**Robinson 17**; Gaither 14	

== Awards and honors ==
=== Heisman Trophy voting ===
The Heisman Trophy is given to the year's most outstanding player

Player	School	Position	1st	2nd	3rd	Total
Travis Hunter	Colorado	WR/CB	552	261	53	2,231
Ashton Jeanty	Boise State	RB	309	517	56	2,017
Dillon Gabriel	Oregon	QB	24	52	340	516
Cam Ward	Miami (FL)	QB	6	24	163	229
Cam Skattebo	Arizona State	RB	3	18	125	170
Bryson Daily	Army	QB	3	7	46	69
Tyler Warren	Penn State	TE	1	7	35	52
Shedeur Sanders	Colorado	QB	1	7	30	47
Kurtis Rourke	Indiana	QB	2	3	10	22
Kyle McCord	Syracuse	QB	0	1	7	9

=== Other overall ===
Award	Winner	Position	School
AP Player of the Year	Travis Hunter	WR/CB	Colorado
Lombardi Award	Kelvin Banks Jr.	OT	Texas
Maxwell Award	Ashton Jeanty	RB	Boise State
SN Player of the Year	Travis Hunter	WR/CB	Colorado
Walter Camp Award	Travis Hunter	WR/CB	Colorado

=== Special overall ===
Award	Winner	Position	School
Burlsworth Trophy (top player who began as walk-on)	Bryce Boettcher	LB	Oregon
Paul Hornung Award (most versatile player)	Travis Hunter	WR/CB	Colorado
Polynesian Football Player of the Year Award (top Polynesian player)	Tetairoa McMillan	WR	Arizona
Jon Cornish Trophy (top Canadian player)	Kurtis Rourke	QB	Indiana
Campbell Trophy ("academic Heisman")	Jalen Milroe	QB	Alabama
Academic All-American of the Year	Travis Hunter	WR/CB	Colorado
Wuerffel Trophy (humanitarian-athlete)	Nick Dawkins	C	Penn State

=== Offense ===
Quarterback

Award	Winner	School
Davey O'Brien Award	Cam Ward	Miami (FL)
Johnny Unitas Golden Arm Award	Shedeur Sanders	Colorado
Manning Award	Cam Ward	Miami (FL)

Running back

Award	Winner	School
Doak Walker Award	Ashton Jeanty	Boise State

Wide receiver

Award	Winner	School
Fred Biletnikoff Award	Travis Hunter	Colorado

Tight end

Award	Winner	School
John Mackey Award	Tyler Warren	Penn State

Lineman

Award	Winner	Position	School
Rimington Trophy (center)	Seth McLaughlin	C	Ohio State
Outland Trophy (interior lineman)	Kelvin Banks Jr.	OT	Texas
Joe Moore Award (offensive line unit)	OL (Note: Starting lineup: Left tackle: Connor Finucane; Left guard: Paolo Gennarelli; Center: Brady Small; Right guard: Bill Katsigiannis; Right tackle: Lucas Scott)		Army

=== Defense ===
Award	Winner	Position	School
Bronko Nagurski Trophy (defensive player)	Kyle Kennard	DE	South Carolina
Chuck Bednarik Award (defensive player)	Travis Hunter	CB	Colorado
Lott Trophy (defensive impact)	Travis Hunter	CB	Colorado

Defensive front

Award	Winner	School
Dick Butkus Award (linebacker)	Jalon Walker	Georgia
Ted Hendricks Award (defensive end)	Donovan Ezeiruaku	Boston College

Defensive back

Award	Winner	Position	School
Jim Thorpe Award	Jahdae Barron	CB	Texas

=== Special teams ===
Award	Winner	School
Lou Groza Award (placekicker)	Kenneth Almendares	Louisiana
Ray Guy Award (punter)	Eddie Czaplicki	USC
Jet Award (return specialist)	Kaden Wetjen	Iowa
Patrick Mannelly Award (long snapper)	Rocco Underwood	Florida

=== Coaches ===
Award	Winner	School
AFCA Coach of the Year	Curt Cignetti	Indiana
AP Coach of the Year	Curt Cignetti	Indiana
Bobby Dodd Coach of the Year	Marcus Freeman	Notre Dame
Eddie Robinson Coach of the Year	Curt Cignetti	Indiana
George Munger Award	Marcus Freeman	Notre Dame
Home Depot Coach of the Year	Curt Cignetti	Indiana
Paul "Bear" Bryant Award	Marcus Freeman	Notre Dame
Walter Camp Coach of the Year	Curt Cignetti	Indiana

==== Assistants ====
Award	Winner	Coordinator	School
AFCA Assistant Coach of the Year	Sean Saturnio	Special teams	Army
Broyles Award	Al Golden	Defensive	Notre Dame

=== All-Americans ===
The following players were recognized as consensus All-Americans for 2024. Unanimous selections are followed by an asterisk (*).

2024 Consensus All-Americans
Name	Position	Year	University
Cam Ward	Quarterback	Senior	Miami (FL)
Ashton Jeanty*	Running back	Junior	Boise State
Kaleb Johnson	Running back	Junior	Iowa
Tetairoa McMillan	Wide receiver	Junior	Arizona
Nick Nash*	Wide receiver	Senior	San Jose State
Harold Fannin Jr.	Tight end	Junior	Bowling Green
Kelvin Banks*	Offensive line	Junior	Texas
Will Campbell	Offensive line	Junior	LSU
Seth McLaughlin	Offensive line	Senior	Ohio State
Wyatt Milum	Offensive line	Senior	West Virginia
Addison West	Offensive line	Senior	Western Michigan
Donovan Ezeiruaku	Defensive line	Senior	Boston College
Kyle Kennard	Defensive line	Senior	South Carolina
Abdul Carter*	Defensive line	Junior	Penn State
Mason Graham*	Defensive line	Junior	Michigan
Walter Nolen	Defensive line	Junior	Ole Miss
Shaun Dolac	Linebacker	Senior	Buffalo
Jay Higgins*	Linebacker	Senior	Iowa
Danny Stutsman	Linebacker	Senior	Oklahoma
Jahdae Barron	Defensive back	Senior	Texas
Xavier Watts	Defensive back	Senior	Notre Dame
Nohl Williams	Defensive back	Senior	California
Caleb Downs*	Defensive back	Sophomore	Ohio State
Kenneth Almendares	Kicker	Senior	Louisiana
Alex Mastromanno	Punter	Senior	Florida State
Travis Hunter*	All-purpose/return specialist	Junior	Colorado

== Coaching changes ==
=== Preseason and in-season ===
This is restricted to coaching changes taking place on or after May 1, 2024, and will include any changes announced after a team's last regularly scheduled game but before its bowl game. For coaching changes that occurred earlier in 2024, see 2023 NCAA Division I FBS end-of-season coaching changes.

School	Outgoing coach	Date	Reason	Replacement
Fresno State	Jeff Tedford	July 15, 2024	Resigned	Tim Skipper (interim)
Utah State	Blake Anderson	July 18, 2024	Fired	Nate Dreiling (interim)
East Carolina	Mike Houston	October 20, 2024	Fired	Blake Harrell (initially interim; named permanent on November 25)
Southern Miss	Will Hall	October 20, 2024	Fired	Reed Stringer (interim)
Rice	Mike Bloomgren	October 27, 2024	Fired	Pete Alamar (interim)
Kennesaw State	Brian Bohannon	November 10, 2024	Fired	Chandler Burks (interim)
Ball State	Mike Neu	November 16, 2024	Fired	Colin Johnson (interim)
Temple	Stan Drayton	November 17, 2024	Fired	Everett Withers (interim)
UMass	Don Brown	November 18, 2024	Fired	Shane Montgomery (interim)
Florida Atlantic	Tom Herman	November 18, 2024	Fired	Chad Lunsford (interim)
Charlotte	Biff Poggi	November 18, 2024	Fired	Tim Brewster (interim)
Tulsa	Kevin Wilson	November 24, 2024	Fired	Ryan Switzer (interim)
North Carolina	Mack Brown	November 26, 2024	Fired	Freddie Kitchens (interim, bowl)
West Virginia	Neal Brown	December 1, 2024	Fired	Chad Scott (interim, bowl)
Sam Houston	K. C. Keeler	December 1, 2024	Hired by Temple	Brad Cornelsen (interim, bowl)
Ohio	Tim Albin	December 7, 2024	Hired by Charlotte	Brian Smith (initially interim; named permanent on December 18)
Marshall	Charles Huff	December 8, 2024	Hired by Southern Miss	Telly Lockette (interim, bowl)
UNLV	Barry Odom	December 8, 2024	Hired by Purdue	Del Alexander (interim, bowl)
Jacksonville State	Rich Rodriguez	December 12, 2024	Hired by West Virginia	Rod Smith (interim, bowl)
Washington State	Jake Dickert	December 18, 2024	Hired by Wake Forest	Pete Kaligis (interim, bowl)

=== End of season ===
The list includes coaching changes announced during the season that did not take effect until the end of the season.

School	Outgoing coach	Date	Reason	Replacement	Previous position
Central Michigan	Jim McElwain	November 20, 2024	Retired	Matt Drinkall	Army offensive line coach
Rice	Pete Alamar (interim)	November 26, 2024	Permanent replacement	Scott Abell	Davidson head coach
UCF	Gus Malzahn	November 30, 2024	Hired as offensive coordinator by Florida State	Scott Frost	Los Angeles Rams senior analyst
Purdue	Ryan Walters	December 1, 2024	Fired	Barry Odom	UNLV head coach
FIU	Mike MacIntyre	December 1, 2024	Fired	Willie Simmons	Duke running backs coach
Kennesaw State	Chandler Burks (interim)	December 1, 2024	Permanent replacement	Jerry Mack	Jacksonville Jaguars running backs coach
Temple	Everett Withers (interim)	December 1, 2024	Permanent replacement	K. C. Keeler	Sam Houston head coach
Appalachian State	Shawn Clark	December 2, 2024	Fired	Dowell Loggains	South Carolina offensive coordinator and quarterbacks coach
Florida Atlantic	Chad Lunsford (interim)	December 2, 2024	Permanent replacement	Zach Kittley	Texas Tech offensive coordinator and quarterbacks coach
Ball State	Colin Johnson (interim)	December 4, 2024	Permanent replacement	Mike Uremovich	Butler head coach
UMass	Shane Montgomery (interim)	December 4, 2024	Permanent replacement	Joe Harasymiak	Rutgers defensive coordinator
Fresno State	Tim Skipper (interim)	December 4, 2024	Permanent replacement	Matt Entz	USC associate head coach and linebackers coach
Utah State	Nate Dreiling (interim)	December 6, 2024	Permanent replacement	Bronco Mendenhall	New Mexico head coach
New Mexico	Bronco Mendenhall	December 6, 2024	Hired by Utah State	Jason Eck	Idaho head coach
Charlotte	Tim Brewster (interim)	December 7, 2024	Permanent replacement	Tim Albin	Ohio head coach
Southern Miss	Reed Stringer (interim)	December 8, 2024	Permanent replacement	Charles Huff	Marshall head coach
Marshall	Telly Lockette (interim/bowl)	December 8, 2024	Permanent replacement	Tony Gibson	NC State defensive coordinator and linebackers coach
Tulsa	Ryan Switzer (interim)	December 8, 2024	Permanent replacement	Tre Lamb	East Tennessee State head coach
North Carolina	Freddie Kitchens (interim/bowl)	December 11, 2024	Permanent replacement	Bill Belichick	New England Patriots head coach and de facto general manager
West Virginia	Chad Scott (interim/bowl)	December 12, 2024	Permanent replacement	Rich Rodriguez	Jacksonville State head coach
UNLV	Del Alexander (interim/bowl)	December 12, 2024	Permanent replacement	Dan Mullen	Florida head coach
Wake Forest	Dave Clawson	December 16, 2024	Resigned	Jake Dickert	Washington State head coach
Sam Houston	Brad Cornelsen (interim/bowl)	December 18, 2024	Permanent replacement	Phil Longo	Wisconsin offensive coordinator and quarterbacks coach
Jacksonville State	Rod Smith (interim/bowl)	December 20, 2024	Permanent replacement	Charles Kelly	Auburn co-defensive coordinator and safeties coach
Washington State	Pete Kaligis (interim, bowl)	December 28, 2024	Permanent replacement	Jimmy Rogers	South Dakota State head coach
Bowling Green	Scot Loeffler	February 28, 2025	Hired as QB coach by Philadelphia Eagles	Eddie George	Tennessee State head coach
Stanford	Troy Taylor	March 25, 2025	Fired	Frank Reich (interim)	Carolina Panthers head coach
Kent State	Kenni Burns	April 11, 2025	Fired	Mark Carney (initially interim; named permanent on October 30)	Kent State offensive coordinator

== Television viewers and ratings ==
=== Top 10 most watched regular season games ===
All times Eastern. Rankings are from the AP Poll (before 11/5) and CFP Rankings (thereafter).

Rank	Date	Time	Matchup				Network	Viewers (millions)	Significance
1	October 19	7:30 p.m.	No. 5 Georgia	30	No. 1 Texas	15	ABC	13.19	College GameDay
2	November 30	12:00 p.m.	Michigan	13	No. 2 Ohio State	10	Fox	12.30	The Game, Big Noon Kickoff
3	September 28	7:30 p.m.	No. 2 Georgia	34	No. 4 Alabama	41	ABC	11.99	Rivalry, College GameDay
4	October 19	3:30 p.m.	No. 7 Alabama	17	No. 11 Tennessee	24	ABC	10.23	Third Saturday in October, SEC Nation
5	November 16	7:30 p.m.	No. 7 Tennessee	17	No. 12 Georgia	31	ABC	9.96	Rivalry, College GameDay
6	November 2	12:00 p.m.	No. 4 Ohio State	20	No. 2 Penn State	13	Fox	9.77	Rivalry, College GameDay, Big Noon Kickoff
7	October 12	7:30 p.m.	No. 2 Ohio State	31	No. 3 Oregon	32	NBC	9.60	College GameDay
8	November 30	7:30 p.m.	No. 3 Texas	17	No. 20 Texas A&M	7	ABC	9.45	Lone Star Showdown, College GameDay
9	December 14	3:00 p.m.	No. 22 Army	13	Navy	31	CBS	9.40	Rivalry
10	November 23	12:00 p.m.	No. 5 Indiana	15	No. 2 Ohio State	38	Fox	9.32	College GameDay, Big Noon Kickoff

=== Conference championship games ===
All times Eastern. Rankings are from the CFP Rankings.

Rank	Date	Time	Matchup				Network	Viewers (millions)	Conference	Location
1	December 7	4:00 p.m.	No. 5 Georgia	22 ^{OT}	No. 2 Texas	19	ABC	16.63	SEC	Mercedes-Benz Stadium, Atlanta, GA
2	December 7	8:00 p.m.	No. 3 Penn State	37	No. 1 Oregon	45	CBS	10.50	Big Ten	Lucas Oil Stadium, Indianapolis, IN
3	December 7	12:00 p.m.	No. 16 Iowa State	19	No. 15 Arizona State	45	ABC	6.90	Big 12	AT&T Stadium, Arlington, TX
4	December 7	8:00 p.m.	No. 17 Clemson	34	No. 8 SMU	31	ABC	5.98	ACC	Bank of America Stadium, Charlotte, NC
5	December 6	8:00 p.m.	No. 20 UNLV	7	No. 10 Boise State	21	Fox	3.81	MW	Albertsons Stadium, Boise, ID
6	December 6	8:00 p.m.	Tulane	14	No. 24 Army	35	ABC	2.00	AAC	Michie Stadium, West Point, NY
7	December 7	12:00 p.m.	Ohio	38	Miami (OH)	3	ESPN	1.13	MAC	Ford Field, Detroit, MI
8	December 7	7:30 p.m.	Marshall	31	Louisiana	3	ESPN	0.392	Sun Belt	Cajun Field, Lafayette, LA
—N/a	December 7	7:00 p.m.	Western Kentucky	12	Jacksonville State	52	CBSSN	n.a. (Note: Viewership is not available for CBSSN because it is not Nielsen rated)	CUSA	AmFirst Stadium, Jacksonville, AL

=== Most watched non-CFP bowl games ===
All times Eastern. Rankings are from the CFP Rankings.

Rank	Date	Time	Matchup				Network	Viewers (millions)	Game	Location
1	December 28	7:30 p.m.	No. 17 BYU	36	No. 23 Colorado	14	ABC	8.00	Alamo Bowl	Alamodome, San Antonio, Texas
2	December 28	3:30 p.m.	No. 18 Iowa State	42	No. 13 Miami (FL)	41	ABC	6.79	Pop-Tarts Bowl	Camping World Stadium, Orlando, Florida
3	December 27	7:00 p.m.	Texas Tech	26	Arkansas	39	ESPN	4.21	Liberty Bowl	Simmons Bank Liberty Stadium, Memphis, Tennessee
4	December 28	12:00 p.m.	Boston College	15	Nebraska	20	ABC	4.19	Pinstripe Bowl	Yankee Stadium, Bronx, New York
5	December 27	3:30 p.m.	Georgia Tech	27	Vanderbilt	35	ESPN	4.05	Birmingham Bowl	Protective Stadium, Birmingham, Alabama
6	December 26	5:30 p.m.	Rutgers	41	Kansas State	44	ESPN	3.50	Rate Bowl	Chase Field, Phoenix, Arizona
7	January 3, 2025	7:30 p.m.	Minnesota	24	Virginia Tech	10	ESPN	3.38	Duke's Mayo Bowl	Bank of America Stadium, Charlotte, North Carolina.
8	December 27	8:00 p.m.	No. 21 Syracuse	52	Washington State	35	Fox	2.93	Holiday Bowl	Snapdragon Stadium, San Diego, California
9	December 27	12:00 p.m.	Oklahoma	20	Navy	21	ESPN	2.85	Armed Forces Bowl	Amon G. Carter Stadium, Fort Worth, Texas
10	December 30	2:30 p.m.	Iowa	24	No. 19 Missouri	27	ESPN	2.82	Music City Bowl	Nissan Stadium, Nashville, Tennessee

=== College Football Playoff games ===
Rank	Date	Time	Matchup				Network	Viewers (millions)	Game	Location
	December 20	8:00 pm (ET)	No. 10 Indiana	17	No. 7 Notre Dame	27	ABC/ESPN	13.4	Non-bowl game (First round)	Notre Dame Stadium; Notre Dame, IN (Campus site)
	December 21	12:00 pm (ET)	No. 11 SMU	10	No. 6 Penn State	38	TNT	6.4	Non-bowl game (First round)	Beaver Stadium; University Park, PA (Campus site)
	December 21	4:00 pm (ET)	No. 16 Clemson	24	No. 3 Texas	38	TNT	8.6	Non-bowl game (First round)	Darrell K. Royal Memorial Stadium; Austin, TX (Campus site)
	December 21	8:00 pm (ET)	No. 9 Tennessee	17	No. 8 Ohio State	42	ABC/ESPN	14.3	Non-bowl game (First round)	Ohio Stadium; Columbus, OH (Campus site)
	December 31	7:30 pm (ET)	No. 6 Penn State	31	No. 3 Boise State	14	ESPN	13.9	Fiesta Bowl (Quarterfinals)	State Farm Stadium; Glendale, Arizona
	January 1	1:00 pm (ET)	No. 3 Texas	39^{2OT}	No. 4 Arizona State	31	ESPN	17.3	Peach Bowl (Quarterfinals)	Mercedes-Benz Stadium; Atlanta, Georgia
	January 1	5:00 pm (ET)	No. 8 Ohio State	41	No. 1 Oregon	21	ESPN	21.1	Rose Bowl (Quarterfinals)	Rose Bowl; Pasadena, California
	January 2	4:00 pm (ET)	No. 7 Notre Dame	23	No. 2 Georgia	10	ESPN	15.8	Sugar Bowl (Quarterfinals)	Caesars Superdome; New Orleans, Louisiana
	January 9	7:30 pm (ET)	No. 6 Penn State	24	No. 7 Notre Dame	27	ESPN	17.8	Orange Bowl (Semifinals)	Hard Rock Stadium; Miami Gardens, Florida
	January 10	7:30 pm (ET)	No. 3 Texas	14	No. 8 Ohio State	28	ESPN	20.9	Cotton Bowl (Semifinals)	AT&T Stadium; Arlington, Texas
	January 20	7:30 pm (ET)	No. 8 Ohio State	34	No. 7 Notre Dame	23	ESPN	22.1	College Football Playoff National Championship	Mercedes-Benz Stadium; Atlanta, Georgia

== Television changes ==
This was the first year of a new 10-year television deal for the Southeastern Conference, whose games are now fully exclusive to ABC, SEC Network and the ESPN networks. ABC replaces CBS as the over-the-air television home of the SEC and exclusive television home of the SEC Championship Game.

Oregon State and Washington State, the two remaining members of the Pac-12 Conference, announced a one-year agreement with The CW and Fox (2 games) on May 14, 2024.

After extending their contract in March with the College Football Playoff, ESPN sublicensed two first-round games to TNT Sports, their first since 2006. ESPN will also sublicense two quarterfinal bowl games to TNT beginning in 2026. The games were presented as an ESPN production, with no graphical changes or any hosts from TNT Sports.

Beginning this season, TNT Sports aired third-tier Mountain West Conference games on TruTV.

== Attendances ==
#	Team	Average
1	Michigan	110,548
2	Penn State	108,379
3	Ohio State	104,216
4	Texas A&M	102,847
5	Texas	102,386
6	Tennessee	101,915
7	Alabama	100,077
8	LSU	99,518
9	Georgia	93,033
10	Florida	90,017
11	Auburn	88,043
12	Nebraska	86,900
13	Oklahoma	83,513
14	Clemson	80,806
15	South Carolina	79,329
16	Notre Dame	77,622
17	Wisconsin	76,057
18	Arkansas	73,392
19	USC	71,571
20	Iowa	69,250
21	Washington	68,865
22	Ole Miss	67,282
23	Virginia Tech	65,632
24	Michigan State	65,307
25	BYU	62,849
26	Missouri	62,621
27	Miami Hurricanes	59,931
28	Purdue	59,887
29	Kentucky	59,516
30	Oregon	59,104
31	Texas Tech	58,623
32	Iowa State	57,884
33	NC State	56,919
34	Illinois	54,750
35	Florida State	53,479
36	Pittsburgh	53,077
37	Utah	52,962
38	Colorado	52,514
39	West Virginia	52,459
40	Oklahoma State	52,202
41	Kansas State	51,536
42	Louisville	50,863
43	Arizona State	48,984
44	Mississippi State	48,809
45	Indiana	48,374
46	Rutgers	48,341
47	North Carolina	47,686
48	Minnesota	47,467
49	UCLA	46,805
50	Arizona	46,747
51	TCU	44,605
52	UCF	43,047
53	Baylor	42,302
54	Fresno State	40,600
55	Boston College	39,839
56	Navy	39,825
57	Kansas	39,408
58	California	39,173
59	Syracuse	39,130
60	Virginia	38,999
61	Georgia Tech	38,216
62	ECU	37,403
63	Boise State	37,235
64	Cincinnati	36,615
65	Maryland	36,040
66	Oregon State	35,799
67	Appalachian State	34,623
68	Colorado State	33,082
69	SMU	32,652
70	UNLV	32,203
71	South Florida	31,424
72	Wake Forest	29,737
73	Vanderbilt	28,091
74	Houston	27,423
75	Army West Point	26,771
76	Air Force	26,226
77	Duke	26,183
78	Stanford	26,035
79	UConn	25,375
80	James Madison	25,071
81	San Diego State	24,770
82	Memphis	24,552
83	Tulane	23,980
84	Troy	23,630
85	Texas State	23,619
86	North Texas	23,022
87	Marshall	23,022
88	Georgia Southern	22,516
89	Southern Miss	22,457
90	Washington State	22,413
91	Wyoming	21,937
92	Toledo	21,519
93	UTSA	21,059
94	Tulsa	20,411
95	Liberty	20,345
96	Old Dominion	20,272
97	Florida Atlantic	19,500
98	UTEP	19,393
99	Western Michigan	19,217
100	UAB	19,167
101	Coastal Carolina	18,622
102	Jacksonville State	18,218
103	South Alabama	18,169
104	Rice	18,143
105	Louisiana	17,952
106	Arkansas State	17,871
107	Central Michigan	17,752
108	Ohio	17,641
109	Northwestern	17,470
110	Nevada	17,419
111	Utah State	16,992
112	San Jose State	16,058
113	New Mexico	16,001
114	Louisiana Tech	15,999
115	Louisiana–Monroe	15,803
116	Eastern Michigan	15,489
117	Buffalo	14,785
118	Georgia State	14,431
119	New Mexico State	14,350
120	Charlotte	14,137
121	Temple	13,919
122	Western Kentucky	13,828
123	FIU	13,557
124	Bowling Green	13,358
125	Hawaii	12,963
126	Middle Tennessee	12,877
127	Massachusetts	12,269
128	Miami RedHawks	12,193
129	Northern Illinois	12,162
130	Sam Houston State	10,983
131	Ball State	9,841
132	Kennesaw State	9,012
133	Kent State	8,447
134	Akron	6,374

== See also ==
- 2024 NCAA Division I FCS football season
- 2024 NCAA Division II football season
- 2024 NCAA Division III football season
- 2024 NAIA football season
- 2024 U Sports football season
