= 2021 NCAA Division I Football Championship Game =

Postseason college football game

2021 NCAA Division I Football Championship
- FCS National Championship Game
Sam Houston State Bearkats	South Dakota State Jackrabbits
(9–0)	(8–1)
Southland Conference	MVFC
23	21
Head coach: K. C. Keeler	Head coach: John Stiegelmeier
STATS / Seed; 4 / 2	STATS / Seed; 2 / 1
	1	2	3	4	Total
Sam Houston State	0	14	3	6	23
South Dakota State	7	0	0	14	21
- Date: May 16, 2021
- Season: 2020
- Stadium: Toyota Stadium
- Location: Frisco, Texas
- MVP: Jequez Ezzard (WR, Sam Houston State)
- Favorite: South Dakota State by 6
- Referee: Steve Cadorette
- Attendance: 7,840

United States TV coverage
- Network: ABC
- Announcers: Dave Pasch (play-by-play), Andre Ware (analyst), and Kris Budden (sideline)

The 2021 NCAA Division I Football Championship Game was a postseason college football game played to determine a national champion in the NCAA Division I Football Championship Subdivision for the 2020–21 season. It was played at Toyota Stadium in Frisco, Texas, on May 16, 2021. It was the culminating game of the 2020–21 FCS Playoffs. The Sam Houston State Bearkats defeated the South Dakota State Jackrabbits, 23–21.

== Background ==
The regular season and postseason schedules for the NCAA Division I Football Championship Subdivision (FCS) were both impacted by the COVID-19 pandemic in the United States. Multiple FCS conferences moved their scheduled games from the fall of 2020 to the spring of 2021, and in August 2020, the NCAA announced that the FCS postseason would also be delayed. While the NCAA at one point announced a cancellation of the FCS playoff, in late September a revised playoff schedule was announced, with the Championship Game to be played in mid-May 2021. The date of the Championship Game was later set for May 16.

The 2021 Championship Game matched the final two teams from a 16-team playoff bracket, reduced from the normal 24-team bracket. The playoffs began with a first round on April 24, followed by quarterfinals on May 1, and then semi-finals on May 8.

== Teams ==
The participants of the 2021 NCAA Division I Football Championship Game were the finalists of the 2020 FCS Playoffs—South Dakota State and Sam Houston State—which began with a 16-team bracket. Neither program had previously won a Division I Football Championship Game. Sam Houston State head coach K. C. Keeler was head coach of the champion 2003 Delaware Fightin' Blue Hens football team.

=== South Dakota State Jackrabbits ===
The Jackrabbits entered the game in Frisco with an 8–1 record. This was their first appearance in the championship game. SDSU was the top seed in the playoffs and defeated Holy Cross, Southern Illinois, and Delaware at home.

=== Sam Houston State Bearkats ===
The Bearkats entered the game in Frisco with an 9–0 record. This was their third appearance in the championship game, having lost both of their prior appearances, in January 2012 and January 2013. SHSU was the second seed in the playoffs and defeated Monmouth, defending champion North Dakota State, and James Madison at home.

== Game summary ==
2021 NCAA Division I Football Championship Game

Quarter	1	2	3	4	Total
No. 2 Sam Houston State	0	14	3	6	23
No. 1 South Dakota State	7	0	0	14	21

at Toyota Stadium • Frisco, Texas

- Date: Sunday, May 16, 2021
- Game time: 2:00 p.m. EST (1:00 p.m. CST)
- Game weather: Rain • Temperature: 69 °F (21 °C) • Wind: NW 11 mph (18 km/h)
- Game attendance: 7,840 (limited due to COVID-19 pandemic)
- Referee: Steve Cadorette
- TV: ABC
- ESPN game summary
- Sam Houston Radio: KSAM 101.7 FM, Rob Hipp Play-By-Play, Brian Adams, Analyst

Game information

First quarter

- (7:33) SDSU – Isaiah Davis 1-yard rush, Cole Frahm kick (Drive: 5 plays, 41 yards, 2:16; South Dakota State 7–0)

Second quarter

- (11:16) SHST – Jequez Ezzard 35-yard pass from Eric Schmid, Seth Morgan kick (Drive: 3 plays, 56 yards, 1:16; Tied 7–7)
- (1:21) SHST – Jequez Ezzard 15-yard pass from Eric Schmid, Seth Morgan kick (Drive: 9 plays, 74 yards, 3:32; Sam Houston State 14–7)

Third quarter

- (0:37) SHST – Seth Morgan 45-yard field goal (Drive: 10 plays, 39 yards, 4:20; Sam Houston State 17–7)

Fourth quarter

- (13:12) SDSU – Isaiah Davis 28-yard rush, Cole Frahm kick (Drive: 5 plays, 72 yards, 2:15; Sam Houston State 17–14)
- (5:41) SDSU – Isaiah Davis 85-yard rush, Cole Frahm kick (Drive: 2 plays, 85 yards, 0:19; South Dakota State 21–17)
- (0:16) SHST – Ife Adeyi 10-yard pass from Eric Schmid, kick failed (Drive: 16 plays, 65 yards, 5:25; Sam Houston State 23–21)

=== Statistics ===
Statistics	SHSU	SDSU
First downs	29	26
Plays–yards	73–353	59–362
Rushes–yards	36–144	35–239
Passing yards	209	123
Passing: comp–att–int	20–37–0	12–24–1
Turnovers		
Time of possession	31:09	28:51

Team	Category	Player	Statistics
Sam Houston State	Passing	Eric Schmid	20–37, 209 yards, 3 TD
Sam Houston State	Rushing	Ramon Jefferson	16 rushes, 96 yards
Sam Houston State	Receiving	Jequez Ezzard	10 catches, 108 yards, 2 TD
South Dakota State	Passing	Keaton Heide	11–22, 107 yards, 1 INT
South Dakota State	Rushing	Isaiah Davis	14 rushes, 178 yards, 3 TD
South Dakota State	Receiving	Zach Heins	3 catches, 44 yards
