= 2024 Sam Houston Bearkats football team =

American college football season

2024 Sam Houston Bearkats football
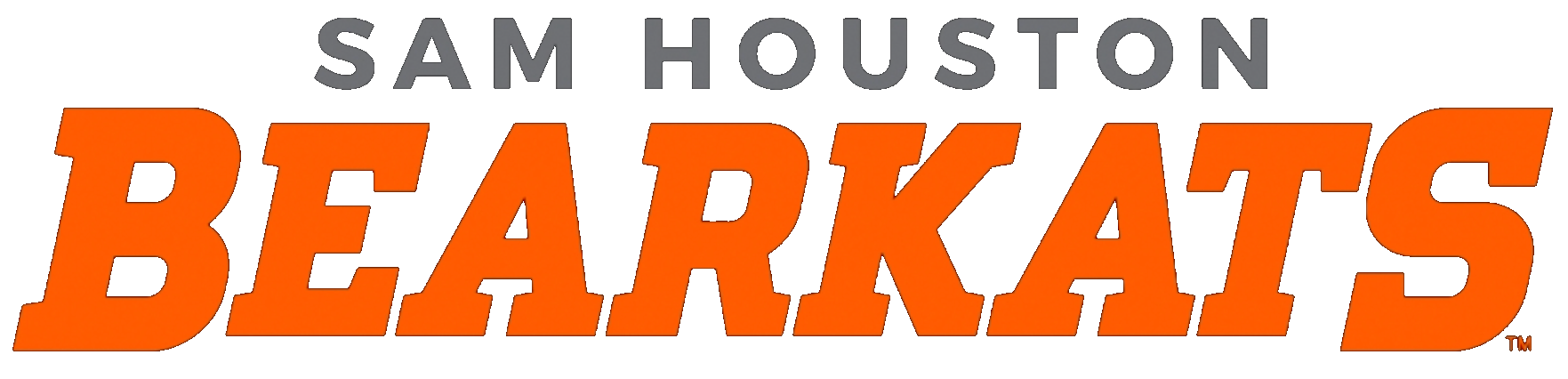

New Orleans Bowl champion

New Orleans Bowl, W 31–26 vs. Georgia Southern
- Conference: Conference USA
- Record: 10–3 (6–2 CUSA)
- Head coach: K. C. Keeler (11th season; regular season); Brad Cornelsen (interim; bowl game)
- Offensive coordinator: Brad Cornelsen (2nd season)
- Offensive scheme: Spread
- Defensive coordinator: Skyler Cassity (1st season)
- Base defense: 3–4
- Home stadium: Bowers Stadium

2024 Conference USA football standings
	Conf.			Overall
Team	W		L	W		L
Jacksonville State y$	7	–	1	9	–	5
Western Kentucky y	6	–	2	8	–	6
Sam Houston	6	–	2	10	–	3
Liberty	5	–	3	8	–	4
Louisiana Tech	4	–	4	5	–	8
UTEP	3	–	5	3	–	9
FIU	3	–	5	4	–	8
New Mexico State	2	–	6	3	–	9
Middle Tennessee	2	–	6	3	–	9
Kennesaw State*	2	–	6	2	–	10
Championship: Jacksonville State 52, Western Kentucky 12
$ – Conference champion; y – Championship game participant; * – Ineligible for postseason play due to FCS-to-FBS transition rules

The 2024 Sam Houston Bearkats football team represented Sam Houston State University in Conference USA (CUSA) during the 2024 NCAA Division I FBS football season. The Bearkats were led by K. C. Keeler during the regular season, in his eleventh year as the head coach. The Bearkats played their home games at Bowers Stadium, located in Huntsville, Texas.

Following a 10–7 road win against FIU on October 22, the Bearkats became bowl eligible in just their second year since joining the FBS.

After the regular season, K. C. Keeler announced he accepted the head coaching position at Temple. He was replaced on an interim basis by offensive coordinator Brad Cornelsen for the New Orleans Bowl.

== Offseason ==
Positions key
Offense	Defense	Special teams
QB — Quarterback; RB — Running back; FB — Fullback; WR — Wide receiver; TE — Tight end; OL — Offensive lineman; T — Tackle; G — Guard; C — Center	DL — Defensive lineman; DT — Defensive tackle (Note: Includes nose tackle (NT)); DE — Defensive end; EDGE — Edge rusher; LB — Linebacker (Note: Includes middle linebacker (MLB/MIKE), weakside linebacker (WILL), strongside linebacker (SAM), off-ball linebacker, and outside linebacker (OLB)); DB — Defensive back; CB — Cornerback; S — Safety (Note: Includes free safety (FS) and strong safety (SS))	K — Kicker (Note: Also known as a placekicker (PK)); P — Punter; LS — Long snapper; RS — Return specialist (Note: Includes kickoff and punt returners)

=== Transfers ===
==== Outgoing ====
Player	Position	Destination
Xavier Ward	QB	San Jose State
Jordan Yates	WR	Tennessee Tech
Zachary Session	OL	McNeese
Dakerric Hobbs	CB	New Mexico State
Da'Marcus Crosby	S	New Mexico State
Kaden Kelly	S	Northeastern State
D'Marea Weaver	DB	None

==== Incoming ====
Player	Position	Previous Team
S'Maje Burrell	LB	Texas
CJ Johnson	LB	Memphis
Jay Ducker	RB	Memphis
Austin Smith	TE	Memphis
Jalen O'Neal	DB	Abilene Christian
Denver Warren	DL	New Mexico State
Fernando Garza	TE	Texas A&M
Austin Smith	TE	Colorado
Dylan Frazier	DL	SMU
Jaylon Jimmerson	DB	Liberty
Isaiah Cash	DB	Houston Christian
Jase Bauer	QB	Central Michigan
Kaden Taylor	WR	North Texas
Quincy Wright	DL	Oregon State
Joe Swen	S	Oregon State
Kason Tullos	LB	Texas A&M
Nyquee Hawkins	S	Virginia Tech
Kendrick DuJour	DL	Coffeyville CC

== Roster ==
2024 Sam Houston Bearkats football team roster
Players
Coaches
Offense

Pos.	#	Name	Class
RB	0	Zach Hrbacek	Jr
RB	1	John Gentry	Jr
WR	2	Ife Adeyi	Sr
WR	3	Simeon Evans	Jr
WR	4	Michael Phoenix II	Jr
QB	5	Grant Gunnell	GS
WR	6	Noah Smith	Sr
WR	7	Qua'Vez Humphreys	Jr
QB	8	Jase Bauer	Jr
RB	9	Jay Ducker	GS
QB	10	Hunter Watson	Jr
WR	11	Malik Phillips	Sr
TE	12	Austin Smith	Jr
QB	13	Sylas Gomez	So
WR	14	Jyzaiah Rockwell	So
QB	15	DJ Bailey	Fr
WR	15	Shane Johnson	Jr
WR	17	Lonnie Adkism	Fr
TE	19	Elijah Sohn	Sr
RB	21	DJ McKinney	Fr
WR	23	Adrian Murdaugh	Jr
WR	25	Matthew Tatum	Fr
RB	26	Trey Taylor	Fr
RB	27	Garret Hagler	So
RB	34	Landan Brown	Fr
TE	48	Braeden Howell	Jr
OL	52	Will Hutchens	Fr
OL	54	Mich'le Joseph	So
OL	56	Luke Eckardt	Jr
OL	57	Ethan Hagler	Sr
OL	59	Graceson Jackson-Smith	Jr
OL	61	Ben Gehrke	Fr
OL	62	Carter Buchheit	Fr
OL	65	Easton Fulton	Fr
OL	68	Jeremiah Edmond	So
OL	69	Seth Kohlscheen	Sr
OL	70	Rhett Larson	So
OL	71	James Dawn II	Jr
OL	73	MarKendrick Beall	Sr
OL	75	William McCollum	Sr
OL	76	Ford Ivey	Fr
OL	78	Orion Irving	So
OL	79	Kolt Dieterich	Fr
WR	80	Fatu Mukuba	Fr
WR	81	Marcus Field	Fr
TE	82	Cooper Stevens	Fr
WR	83	Darrick Bledsoe III	Fr
WR	84	Kaden Taylor	Fr
WR	85	Karson Maynard	Fr
TE	86	Thomas Jewett	Fr
WR	87	Rushil Patel	Fr
WR	88	Terrance Guillory II	Fr
TE	89	Fernando Garza III	Jr

Defense

Pos.	#	Name	Class
DL	0	Chris Murray	Jr
DL	1	Jevon Leon	Sr
DB	2	Da'Veawn Armstead	Jr
DB	3	Caleb Weaver	Jr
DB	4	Jaylon Jimmerson	GS
DB	5	David Fisher	Jr
LB	6	Trey Fields	Sr
DB	7	Emon Allen	Jr
LB	8	Sincere Jackson	Jr
LB	9	Ysidro Mascorro	Jr
LB	10	Jaylen Phillips	Sr
DL	11	Denver Warren	Jr
DB	12	Tyler Bailey	So
DB	13	Ny'Quee Hawkins	GS
LB	14	Kavian Gaither	Sr
DB	15	Jalen O'Neal	Fr
DB	16	Joe Swen	So
OLB	18	Issiah Nixon	Sr
DB	19	Isaiah Cash	GS
DB	20	Chantson Prox	So
DB	21	Dravon Wilson	Fr
DB	22	Jaidan Scott	So
DB	23	Railyn Adams	Fr
DB	24	Elias Escobar	Sr
DB	25	Dax Horany	Fr
LB	26	S'Maje Burrell	Fr
DB	27	Lyric Smith	Fr
LB	28	CJ Johnson	Jr
DB	29	KeSean Raven	Jr
LB	30	Kason Tullos	GS
DB	31	Quan Williams	Jr
DL	33	Kendrick DuJour	So
DB	34	Cadiin Johnson	Jr
LB	35	Gannon Tullos	So
LB	36	Dean Ford	Fr
OLB	37	Jacquis Ishmeal Jr.	Jr
OLB	38	Mitch Melton	Fr
DB	39	Jon-Bernard Reynolds	So
OLB	42	Ca'lub Holloway	So
DL	44	Briceon Hayes	Jr
LB	45	Eli Wallace	Fr
DB	46	Jason Dabney	Fr
LB	50	Forest Gatlin III	Fr
DL	51	Jaredh Frayre	Fr
DL	53	Godgive Ugochukwu	Fr
DL	54	Matthew Westmoreland	Fr
DL	55	Jaden Phillips	Sr
DL	57	Ryan Gilleylen	So
DL	58	Joshua Frayre	Fr
DL	59	Stephan Ochai	Fr
DL	90	Richard Outland	Jr
DL	91	Andrew Edmonson	So
DL	92	Jayden Gaines	Fr
DL	93	Seth Mason	GS
DL	94	Josiah Stephens	Fr
DL	96	Matthew Aribisala	Fr
DL	97	Dylan Frazier	So
DL	98	Quardale Patt	Jr
DL	99	Quincy Wright	So

Special teams

Pos.	#	Name	Class
K, P	39	Shaun Neibert	Fr
LS	41	Zach Stricker	Jr
K, P	43	Jadon Cardell	Jr
LS	46	Carson Whitington	So
K, P	47	Colby Sessums	Jr
K, P	48	Joe Nelson	Fr
K, P	49	Christian Pavon	Jr

Head coach

- K. C. Keeler

Coordinators/assistant coaches

- John Johnson – Assistant head coach/running backs
- Brad Cornelsen – Offensive coordinator
- Skyler Cassity – Defensive coordinator
- Mike Bangtson – Offensive line
- Chris Buckner – Passing game coordinator/wide receivers
- Ike Eguae – Defensive line
- Reggie Johnson – Linebackers
- Matt Merkens – Tight ends
- Greg Richmond – Defensive ends
- Julian Wilson – Defensive backs
- Clayton Barnes – General manager for football
- Zach Milliet – Special teams analyst
- Keaton Altman – Offensive graduate assistant
- Knox Kadum – Offensive graduate assistant
- Ryan Roberts – Defensive graduate assistant
- Jacob Surdy – Defensive graduate assistant

Legend

- (C) Team captain
- (S) Suspended
- (I) Ineligible
- Injured
- Redshirt

Roster
Last update: October 5, 2024

== Preseason ==
=== C-USA media poll ===
The Conference USA preseason media poll was released on July 19. The Bearkats were predicted to finish tied for fifth.

== Schedule ==
Date	Time	Opponent	Site	TV	Result	Attendance
August 31	6:00 p.m.	at Rice*	Rice Stadium; Houston, TX	ESPN+	W 34–14	17,298
September 7	5:30 p.m.	at UCF*	FBC Mortgage Stadium; Orlando, FL	ESPN+	L 14–45	43,807
September 14	6:00 p.m.	Hawaii*	Bowers Stadium; Huntsville, TX	ESPN+	W 31–14	15,134
September 21	6:00 p.m.	New Mexico State	Bowers Stadium; Huntsville, TX	ESPN+	W 31–11	13,059
September 28	2:00 p.m.	vs. Texas State*	NRG Stadium; Houston, TX (rivalry)	ESPN+	W 40–39	27,225
October 3	8:00 p.m.	at UTEP	Sun Bowl; El Paso, TX	CBSSN	W 41–21	14,454
October 16	7:00 p.m.	Western Kentucky	Bowers Stadium; Huntsville, TX	ESPN2	L 14–31	8,914
October 22	6:30 p.m.	at FIU	Pitbull Stadium; Miami, FL	ESPNU	W 10–7	10,625
October 29	7:00 p.m.	Louisiana Tech	Bowers Stadium; Huntsville, TX	ESPNU	W 9–3	9,128
November 16	2:00 p.m.	at Kennesaw State	Fifth Third Bank Stadium; Kennesaw, GA	ESPN+	W 23–17 ^{OT}	7,736
November 23	11:00 a.m.	at Jacksonville State	AmFirst Stadium; Jacksonville, AL	CBSSN	L 11–21	16,312
November 29	2:30 p.m.	Liberty	Bowers Stadium; Huntsville, TX	CBSSN	W 20–18	8,651
December 19	6:00 p.m.	vs. Georgia Southern*	Caesars Superdome; New Orleans, LA (New Orleans Bowl)	ESPN2	W 31–26	13,151
*Non-conference game; All times are in Central time

== Game summaries ==
=== at Rice ===
Sam Houston Bearkats (0–0) vs Rice Owls (0–0) – Game summary

Quarter	1	2	3	4	Total
Bearkats	17	7	10	0	34
Owls	0	7	7	0	14

at Rice Stadium • Houston, TX

- Date: August 31st
- Game time: 6:00 p.m. CDT
- Game weather: Sunny • Temperature: 85 °F (29 °C) • Wind: NE at 8 miles per hour (13 km/h)
- Game attendance: 17,298
- Referee: Reid Jackson
- TV announcers (ESPN+): Chuckie Kempf (play-by-play), Doc Holliday (analyst)

Game information

First quarter

- (9:42) SHSU – Qua'Vez Humphreys 67 yard pass from Hunter Watson, Christian Pavon kick (Drive: 1 play, 67 yards, 0:12; Sam Houston 7–0)
- (8:52) SHSU – David Fisher 30 yard interception return, Christian Pavon kick (Sam Houston 14–0)
- (3:37) SHSU – Christian Pavon 52 yard field goal (Drive: 9 plays, 42 yards, 3:43; Sam Houston 17–0)

Second quarter

- (11:17) RICE – Kobie Campbell 22 yard pass from E.J. Warner, Tim Horn kick (Drive: 5 plays, 50 yards, 2:40; Sam Houston 17–7)
- (1:53) SHSU – Ife Adeyi 32 yard pass from Hunter Watson, Christian Pavon kick (Drive: 6 plays, 56 yards, 2:10; Sam Houston 24–7)

Third quarter

- (10:17) SHSU – John Gentry 1 yard run, Christian Pavon kick (Drive: 10 plays, 76 yards, 4:39; Sam Houston 31–7)
- (7:31) RICE – Dean Connors 15 yard run, Tim Horn kick (Drive: 7 plays, 65 yards, 2:46; Sam Houston 31–14)
- (3:38) SHSU – Christian Pavon 26 yard field goal (Drive: 10 plays, 67 yards, 3:53; Sam Houston 34–14)

Fourth quarter

- No scoring plays

Statistics	SHSU	RICE
First downs	20	14
Total yards	73–407	62–274
Rushing yards	46–178	18–47
Passing yards	229	227
Passing: Comp–Att–Int	16–27–0	27–44–2
Time of possession	35:20	24:40

Team	Category	Player	Statistics
Sam Houston	Passing	Hunter Watson	16/27, 229 yards, 2 TD
Sam Houston	Rushing	Hunter Watson	14 carries, 57 yards
Sam Houston	Receiving	Qua'Vez Humphreys	3 receptions, 93 yards, 1 TD
Rice	Passing	E.J. Warner	27/44, 227 yards, 1 TD, 2 INT
Rice	Rushing	Dean Connors	12 carries, 52 yards, 1 TD
Rice	Receiving	Matt Sykes	6 receptions, 74 yards

=== at UCF ===
Game Two – Sam Houston Bearkats (1–0) vs UCF Knights (1–0) – Game summary

Quarter	1	2	3	4	Total
Bearkats	0	7	0	7	14
Knights	14	10	14	7	45

at FBC Mortgage Stadium • Orlando, FL

- Date: Saturday September 7, 2024
- Game time: 5:30 p.m. CDT
- Game weather: 83 °F (28 °C)
- Game attendance: 43,807
- Referee: Henry Johns
- TV announcers (ESPN+): James Westling (play-by-play) and Leger Douzable (analyst)

Game information

First quarter

- UCF: RJ Harvey 19-yard touchdown (Colton Boomer Kick), 8:17
- UCF: RJ Harvey 2-yard touchdown (Colton Boomer Kick), 3:07

Second quarter

- UCF: Colton Boomer 50-yard field goal, 10:36
- SHSU: Simeon Evans 64-yard touchdown pass from Noah Smith (Christian Pavon Kick), 8:41
- UCF: RJ Harvey 22-yard touchdown (Colton Boomer Kick), 3:59

Third quarter

- UCF: Myles Montgomery 7-yard touchdown (Colton Boomer Kick), 9:58
- UCF: RJ Harvey 2-yard touchdown (Colton Boomer Kick), 7:14

Fourth quarter

- UCF: P. Boone 3-yard touchdown (Colton Boomer Kick), 12:36
- SHSU: Michael Phoenix II 22-yard touchdown pass from Jase Bauer (Christian Pavon Kick), 4:14

Win Probability/Line

- UCF 91.5%, UCF -21, Over/Under 58.5

Statistics	SHSU	UCF
First downs	12	29
Total yards	287	554
Rushing yards	68	384
Passing yards	219	170
Passing: Comp–Att–Int	9-13-2	12-15
Time of possession	25:57	34:03

Team	Category	Player	Statistics
Sam Houston	Passing	Hunter Watson	9/13, 82 yards, 2 INT
Sam Houston	Rushing	Zach Hrbacek	8 carries, 25 yards
Sam Houston	Receiving	Simeon Evans	3 receptions, 89 yards, 1 TD
UCF	Passing	KJ Jefferson	12/15, 169 yards
UCF	Rushing	RJ Harvey	19 carries, 126 yards, 4 TD
UCF	Receiving	Kobe Hudson	5 receptions, 104 yards

=== vs. Hawaii ===
Game Three – Sam Houston Bearkats (1–1) vs Hawaii Rainbow Warriors (1–1) – Game summary

Quarter	1	2	3	4	Total
Rainbow Warriors	0	3	10	0	13
Bearkats	7	10	7	7	31

at Bowers Stadium, Huntsville, TX

- Date: September 14
- Game time: 1:00 p.m. HDT/6:00 p.m. CDT
- Game weather: Sunny, 96 °F (36 °C)
- Game attendance: 15,134
- Referee: Rory Bernard
- TV announcers (ESPN+): Tom Franklin (play-by-play) and John Harris (analyst)
- Box score, Recap

Game information
First quarter
- SHSU – Qua'Vez Humphreys 7-yard pass from Hunter Watson (Christian Pavon kick), 11:00. Bearkats 7–0. Drive: 9 plays, 75 yards, 4:00.

Second quarter

- HAW – Kansei Matsuzawa 33-yard field goal, 13:24. Bearkats 7–3. Drive: 7 plays, 45 yards, 1:51.
- SHSU – Ife Adeyi 9-yard run (Christian Pavon kick), 5:14. Bearkats 14–3. Drive: 16 plays, 75 yards, 8:10.
- SHSU – Christian Pavon 26-yard field goal, 1:58. Bearkats 17–3. Drive: 7 plays, 27 yards, 2:33.

Third quarter

- HAW – Pofele Ashlock 5-yard pass from Brayden Schager (Kansei Matsuzawa kick), 10:03. Bearkats 17–10. Drive: 11 plays, 75 yards, 4:57.
- SHSU – John Gentry 3-yard pass from Hunter Watson (Christian Pavon kick), 7:20. Bearkats 24–10. Drive: 5 plays, 93 yards, 2:36.
- HAW – Kansei Matsuzawa 27-yard field goal, 1:15. Bearkats 24–13. Drive: 12 plays, 55 yards, 6:05.

Fourth quarter

- SHSU – Qua'Vez Humphreys 55-yard pass from Hunter Watson (Christian Pavon kick), 9:41. Bearkats 31–13. Drive: 4 plays, 68 yards, 2:02.

Statistics	HAW	SHSU
First downs	15	22
Total yards	308	422
Rushing yards	56	257
Passing yards	252	165
Turnovers	1	2
Time of possession	25:38	34:22

Team	Category	Player	Statistics
Hawaii	Passing	Brayden Schager	21/42, 252 yards, TD, INT
Hawaii	Rushing	Cam Barfield	5 rushes, 24 yards
Hawaii	Receiving	Pofele Ashlock	8 receptions, 84 yards, TD
Sam Houston	Passing	Hunter Watson	15/23, 165 yards, 3 TD, INT
Sam Houston	Rushing	Jay Ducker	15 rushes, 148 yards
Sam Houston	Receiving	Qua'Vez Humphreys	4 receptions, 106 yards, 2 TD

=== vs. New Mexico State ===
New Mexico State Aggies (1-2) at Sam Houston Bearkats (2-1) – Game summary

Quarter	1	2	3	4	Total
Aggies	3	0	0	8	11
Bearkats	14	7	0	10	31

at Bowers Stadium, Huntsville, TX

- Date: September 21
- Game time: 5:00 p.m. MDT/6:00 p.m. CDT
- Game weather: Sunny, 94 °F (34 °C)
- Game attendance: 13,059
- Referee: Reed Brotherson
- TV announcers (ESPN+): Tom Franklin (play-by-play) and Ken Moore (analyst)
- Box score, Recap

Game information
First quarter
- NMSU – Abraham Montano 32-yard field goal, 6:36. Aggies 3–0. Drive: 13 plays, 58 yards, 4:30.
- SHSU – Hunter Watson 46-yard run (Christian Pavon kick), 5:31. Bearkats 7–3. Drive: 4 plays, 75 yards, 1:05.
- SHSU – Jay Ducker 1-yard run (Christian Pavon kick), 0:35. Bearkats 14–3. Drive: 7 plays, 35 yards, 1:50.

Second quarter

- SHSU – Hunter Watson 8-yard run (Christian Pavon kick), 6:26. Bearakts 21–3. Drive: 17 plays, 80 yards, 8:20.

Third quarter

- No scoring plays

Fourth quarter

- SHSU – Simeon Evans 20-yard pass from Jase Bauer (Christian Pavon kick), 13:29. Bearkats 28–3. Drive: 13 plays, 89 yards, 6:36.
- NMSU – Jerry Lydiatt 3-yard pass from Santino Marucci (Santino Marucci pass to Seth McGowan), 8:35. Bearkats 28–11. Drive: 12 plays, 74 yards, 4:47.
- SHSU – Christian Pavon 46-yard field goal, 1:51. Bearkats 31–11. Drive: 13 plays, 45 yards, 6:44.

Statistics	NMSU	SHSU
First downs	12	24
Total yards	152	382
Rushing yards	78	280
Passing yards	74	102
Passing: Comp–Att–Int	14–29–2	12–26–2
Time of possession	23:22	36:38

Team	Category	Player	Statistics
New Mexico State	Passing	Santino Marucci	14/29, 74 yards, TD, 2 INT
New Mexico State	Rushing	Seth McGowan	12 rushes, 50 yards
New Mexico State	Receiving	T. J. Pride	5 receptions, 33 yards
Sam Houston	Passing	Hunter Watson	9/21, 64 yards, 2 INT
Sam Houston	Rushing	Hunter Watson	12 rushes, 116 yards, 2 TD
Sam Houston	Receiving	Noah Smith	4 receptions, 38 yards

=== vs. Texas State (rivalry) ===
Game Five – Texas State Bobcats (2–1) vs. Sam Houston Bearkats (3–1) – Game summary

Quarter	1	2	3	4	Total
Bobcats	22	10	7	0	39
Bearkats	0	21	13	6	40

at NRG Stadium, Houston, TX

- Date: September 28
- Game time: 2:00 p.m. CDT
- Game weather: Indoors 72 °F
- Game attendance: 27,225
- Referee: Garrett Dickerson
- TV announcers (ESPN+): Randy McIlvoy (play-by-play) and John Harris (analyst)

Game information

First quarter

- TXST– Joey Herbert 6-yard pass from Jordan McCloud, (Mason Shipley kick), 11:08. Drive: 10 plays, 77 yards, 3:46. Bobcats 7–0.
- TXST– Kenny Haynes 29-yard fumble return (Mason Shipley Pass to David Nunez for Two-Point Conversion), 9:21. Drive: 4 plays, 4 yards, 1:47. Bobcats 15–0.
- TXST– Joey Hobert 2-yard pass from Jordan McCloud, (Mason Shipley kick), 2:20. Drive: 14 plays, 58 yards, 5:35. Bobcats 22–0.

Second quarter

- SHSU– Jay Ducker 1-yard run, (Christian Pavon kick), 11:14. Drive: 13 plays, 75 yards, 6:06. Bobcats 22–7.
- SHSU– Jay Ducker 14-yard run, (Christian Pavon kick), 6:16. Drive: 8 plays, 58 yards, 3:26. Bobcats 22–14.
- TXST– Lincoln Pare 14-yard run, (Mason Shipley kick), 3:19. Drive: 7 plays, 65 yards, 2:57. Bobcats 29–14.
- SHSU– Hunter Watson 3-yard run, (Christian Pavon kick), 0:51. Drive: 7 plays, 29 yards, 1:30. Bobcats 29–21.
- TXST– Mason Shipley 60-yard field goal, 0:00. Drive: 5 plays, 48 yards, 0:41. Bobcats 32–14.

Third quarter

- TXST– Kole Wilson 4-yard pass from Jordan McCloud (Mason Shipley Kick), 11:57. Drive: 5 plays, 48 yards, 0:41. Bobcats 39–21.
- SHSU– Hunter Watson 1-yard run (Two Point Conversion failed), 4:30. Bobcats 39–27. Drive: 6 plays, 63 yards, 2:25.
- SHSU– Jay Ducker 1-yard run (Pavon Christian Kick), 0:51. Bobcats 39–34. Drive: 5 plays, 24 yards, 1:50.

Fourth quarter

- SHSU– Pavon Christian 46-yard field goal, 9:28. Drive: 7 plays, 35 yards, 4:31. Bobcats 39–37.
- SHSU– Pavon Christian 24-yard field goal, 0:06. Drive: 11 plays, 72 yards, 6:43. Bearkats 40–39.

Statistics	TXST	SHSU
First downs	25	25
Total yards	417	395
Rushing yards	91	300
Passing yards	326	95
Turnovers	1	1
Time of possession	25:38	34:22

Team	Category	Player	Statistics
Texas State	Passing	Jordan McCloud	29/39, 326 yards, 3 TD
Texas State	Rushing	Ismail Mahdi	17 carries, 57 yards
Texas State	Receiving	Jaden Williams	10 receptions, 133 yards
Sam Houston	Passing	Hunter Watson	10/19, 95 yards
Sam Houston	Rushing	Hunter Watson	27 carries, 105 yards, 2 TD
Sam Houston	Receiving	DJ McKinney	2 receptions, 22 yards

=== at UTEP ===
Game Six – Sam Houston Bearkats (4–1) vs. UTEP Miners (0–4) – Game summary

Quarter	1	2	3	4	Total
Bearkats	7	10	21	3	41
Miners	0	7	7	7	21

at Sun Bowl, El Paso, TX

- Date: October 3
- Game time: 8:00 p.m. CDT
- Game weather: Sunny • Temperature: 83 °F (28 °C) • Wind: NE 3 miles per hour (4.8 km/h)
- Game attendance: 14,454
- Referee: Douglas Mercer
- TV announcers (CBSSN): Alex Del Barrio (play-by-play) and Taylor McHargue (analyst)

Game information

First quarter

- (12:45) SAM – Jay Ducker 39-yard run, Christian Pavon kick (Drive: 5 plays, 75 yards, 2:15; Sam Houston 7–0)

Second quarter

- (4:24) SAM – DJ McKinney 23-yard run, Christian Pavon kick (Drive: 10 plays, 81 yards, 3:19; Sam Houston 14–0)
- (3:12) UTEP – Kory Chapman 0-yard fumble recovery, Buzz Flabiano kick (Sam Houston 14–7)
- (0:17) SAM – Christian Pavon 19-yard field goal (Drive: 13 plays, 73 yards, 2:55; Sam Houston 17–7)

Third quarter

- (13:23) SAM – Qua'Vez Humphreys 33-yard pass from Hunter Watson, Christian Pavon kick (Drive: 2 plays, 62 yards, 0:38; Sam Houston 24–7)
- (5:48) SAM – Michael Phoenix II 34-yard pass from Hunter Watson, Christian Pavon kick (Drive: 11 plays, 90 yards, 5:06; Sam Houston 31–7)
- (3:03) SAM – DJ McKinney 59-yard run, Christian Pavon kick (Drive: 3 plays, 68 yards, 0:53; Sam Houston 38–7)
- (0:23) UTEP – Marcus Vinson 52-yard pass from Cade McConnell, Buzz Flabiano kick (Drive: 6 plays, 75 yards, 2:40; Sam Houston 38–14)

Fourth quarter

- (9:25) UTEP – Ezell Jolly 4-yard run, Buzz Flabiano kick (Drive: 3 plays, 40 yards, 0:41; Sam Houston 38–21)
- (2:07) SAM – Christian Pavon 42-yard field goal (Drive: 13 plays, 50 yards, 7:12; Sam Houston 41–21)

Statistics	SHSU	UTEP
First downs	26	15
Total yards	517	323
Rushing yards	293	119
Passing yards	224	204
Turnovers	1	4
Time of possession	35:17	24:43

Team	Category	Player	Statistics
Sam Houston	Passing	Hunter Watson	19/29, 224 yards, 2 TD
Sam Houston	Rushing	DJ McKinney	14 carries, 138 yards, 2 TD
Sam Houston	Receiving	Qua'Vez Humphreys	2 receptions, 47 yards, TD
UTEP	Passing	Cade McConnell	15/28, 204 yards, TD, INT
UTEP	Rushing	Ezell Jolly	17 carries, 76 yards, TD
UTEP	Receiving	Kenny Odom	4 receptions, 70 yards

=== vs. Western Kentucky ===
Game Seven – Western Kentucky Hilltoppers (4–2) vs. Sam Houston Bearkats (5–1) – Game summary

Quarter	1	2	3	4	Total
Hilltoppers	7	10	0	14	31
Bearkats	0	14	0	0	14

at Bowers Stadium, Huntsville, TX

- Date: October 16
- Game time: 7:00 p.m. CDT
- Game weather: Clear • Temperature: 68 °F (20 °C) • Wind: NE 8 miles per hour (13 km/h)
- Game attendance: 8,914
- Referee: Roy Bernard
- TV announcers (ESPN2): Lowell Galindo (play-by-play) and Fozzy Whittaker (analyst)

Game information

First quarter

- (12:20) WKU – River Helms 17-yard pass from Caden Veltkamp, Lucas Carneiro kick (Drive: 7 plays, 65 yards, 2:40; Western Kentucky 7–0)

Second quarter

- (14:50) SAM – Simeon Evans 37-yard pass from Hunter Watson, Christian Pavon kick (Drive: 8 plays, 77 yards, 3:03; Tied 7–7)
- (10:41) WKU – Lucas Carneiro 51-yard field goal (Drive: 10 plays, 32 yards, 4:09; Western Kentucky 10–7)
- (8:46) SAM – Michael Phoenix II 50-yard pass from Hunter Watson, Christian Pavon kick (Drive: 4 plays, 73 yards, 1:47; Sam Houston 14–10)
- (2:59) WKU – Elijah Young 11-yard pass from Caden Veltkamp, Lucas Carneiro kick (Drive: 13 plays, 75 yards, 5:47; Western Kentucky 17–14)

Third quarter

No scoring plays

Fourth quarter

- (11:45) WKU – K.D. Hutchinson 74-yard pass from Caden Veltkamp, Lucas Carneiro kick (Drive: 3 plays, 80 yards, 1:20; Western Kentucky 24–14)
- (9:31) WKU – Caden Veltkamp 19-yard run, Lucas Carneiro kick (Drive: 3 plays, 24 yards, 0:43; Western Kentucky 31–14)

Statistics	WKU	SHSU
First downs	23	22
Total yards	411	400
Rushing yards	130	165
Passing yards	281	235
Turnovers	1	2
Time of possession	29:45	30:15

Team	Category	Player	Statistics
Western Kentucky	Passing	Caden Veltkamp	20/29, 281 yards, 3 TD
Western Kentucky	Rushing	Elijah Young	23 carries, 97 yards
Western Kentucky	Receiving	K. D. Hutchinson	3 receptions, 88 yards, TD
Sam Houston	Passing	Hunter Watson	6/9, 128 yards, 2 TD
Sam Houston	Rushing	Jase Bauer	11 carries, 41 yards
Sam Houston	Receiving	Simeon Evans	5 receptions, 59 yards, TD

=== at FIU ===
Game Eight – Sam Houston Bearkats (5–2) vs. FIU Panthers (2–5) – Game summary

Quarter	1	2	3	4	Total
Bearkats	0	0	7	3	10
Panthers	0	0	0	7	7

at Pitbull Stadium, Miami, FL

- Date: October 22
- Game time: 6:30 p.m. CDT
- Game weather: Cloudy 79 °F (26 °C)
- Game attendance: 10,626
- Referee: Rodney Burnette
- TV announcers (ESPNU): Matt Schumacker (play-by-play) and Dustin Fox (analyst)

Game information

First quarter

- No scoring plays

Second quarter

- No scoring plays

Third quarter

- SHSU – DJ McKinney 1-yard rush, (Christian Pavon kick), 6:38. Drive: 2 plays, 3 yards, 0:46. Bearkats 7–0.

Fourth quarter

- FIU – Eric Rivers 28-yard pass from Chayden Peery, (Alejandro Prado kick), 14:55. Drive: 12 plays, 65 yards, 6:43. Tie 7–7.
- SHSU – Pavon Christian 20-yard field goal, 1:57. Drive: 12 plays, 79 yards, 6:06. Bearkats 10–7.

Statistics	SHSU	FIU
First downs	13	11
Total yards	210	200
Rushing yards	134	126
Passing yards	76	74
Turnovers	0	1
Time of possession	31:54	28:06

Team	Category	Player	Statistics
Sam Houston	Passing	Jase Bauer	14/21, 76 yards
Sam Houston	Rushing	Jase Bauer	15 carries, 72 yards
Sam Houston	Receiving	Simeon Evans	5 receptions, 35 yards
FIU	Passing	Chayden Peery	7/12, 58 yards, 1 TD
FIU	Rushing	Shomari Lawrence	8 carries, 44 yards
FIU	Receiving	Eric Rivers	3 receptions, 42 yards, 1 TD

=== vs. Louisiana Tech ===
Game Nine – Louisiana Tech Bulldogs (3–4) vs. Sam Houston Bearkats (6–2) – Game summary

Quarter	1	2	3	4	Total
Bulldogs	3	0	0	0	3
Bearkats	2	0	7	0	9

at Bowers Stadium, Huntsville, TX

- Date: October 29
- Game time: 7:00 p.m. CDT
- Game weather: Sunny • Temperature: 79 °F (26 °C) • Wind: SE 12 miles per hour (19 km/h)
- Game attendance: 9,128
- Referee: Ron Hudson
- TV announcers (ESPNU): Mike Corey (play-by-play) and Rene Ingoglia (analyst)

Game information

First quarter

- LT– Buck Buchanan 24-yard field goal, 2:24. Drive: 13 plays, 48 yards, 5:24. Bulldogs 3–0.
- SHSU– Kendrick DuJour safety, 0:00. Bulldogs 3–2.

Second quarter

- No scoring plays

Third quarter

- SHSU– Jay Ducker 40-yard run, (Christian Pavon kick) 11:40. Drive: 7 plays, 75 yards, 3:20. Bearkats 9–3.

Fourth quarter

- No scoring plays

Statistics	LT	SHSU
First downs	20	11
Total yards	312	268
Rushing yards	105	105
Passing yards	207	163
Turnovers	4	2
Time of possession	32:33	27:27

Team	Category	Player	Statistics
Louisiana Tech	Passing	Evan Bullock	16/25, 148 yards, 1 INT
Louisiana Tech	Rushing	Omiri Wiggins	11 carries, 49 yards
Louisiana Tech	Receiving	Tru Edwards	8 receptions, 80 yards
Sam Houston	Passing	Hunter Watson	14/22, 146 yards, 1 INT
Sam Houston	Rushing	Jay Ducker	13 carries, 72 yards, 1 TD
Sam Houston	Receiving	Noah Smith	6 receptions, 47 yards

=== at Kennesaw State ===
Game Ten – Sam Houston Bearkats (7–2) vs. Kennesaw State Owls (1–8) – Game summary

Quarter	1	2	3	4	OT	Total
Bearkats	0	3	7	7	6	23
Owls	0	3	7	7	0	17

at Fifth Third Bank Stadium • Kennesaw, Georgia

- Date: November 16th
- Game time: 3:00 p.m. EDT
- Game weather: Sunny, 67 °F (19 °C)
- Game attendance: 7,736
- Referee: Douglas Mercer
- TV announcers (ESPN+): Nolan Alexander (play-by-play), Barclay Miller (analyst) and Lauren Hoffman (sideline)

Game information

First quarter

No scoring plays

Second quarter

- (10:17) KENN – Austin Welch 25 yard field goal (Drive: 13 plays, 83 yards, 10:27; KENN 3–0)
- (1:56) SHSU – Christian Pavon 29 yard field goal (Drive: 5 plays, 41 yards, 2:15; TIED 3–3)

Third quarter

- (9:27) SHSU – Hunter Watson 25 yard run, Christian Pavon kick (Drive: 13 plays, 75 yards, 5:26; SHSU 10–3)
- (3:01) KENN – Michael Benefield 1 yard run, Austin Welch kick (Drive: 2 plays, 7 yards, 0:38; TIED 10–10)

Fourth quarter

- (1:54) SHSU – Jay Ducker 17 yard run, Christian Pavon kick (Drive: 8 plays, 70 yards, 4:06; SHSU 17–10)
- (0:25) KENN – Carson Kent 9 yard pass from Davis Bryson, Austin Welch kick (Drive: 10 plays, 71 yards, 1:21; TIED 17–17)

Overtime

- SHSU – Hunter Watson 10 yard run (Drive: 3 plays, 25 yards; SHSU 23–17)

Statistics	SHSU	KENN
First downs	21	13
Total yards	382	243
Rushing yards	203	106
Passing yards	179	137
Passing: Comp–Att–Int	22–32–1	16–24–1
Time of possession	32:24	27:36

Team	Category	Player	Statistics
Sam Houston	Passing	Hunter Watson	22/32, 179 yds, 1 INT
Sam Houston	Rushing	Jay Ducker	18 carries, 111 yards, 1 TD
Sam Houston	Receiving	Simeon Evans	5 receptions, 64 yards
Kennesaw State	Passing	Davis Bryson	16/24, 137 yds, 1 TD, 1 INT
Kennesaw State	Rushing	Davis Bryson	12 carries, 46 yards
Kennesaw State	Receiving	Blake Bohannon	5 receptions, 55 yards

=== at Jacksonville State ===
Game Eleven – Sam Houston Bearkats (8–2) vs. Jacksonville State Gamecocks (7–3) – Game summary

Quarter	1	2	3	4	Total
Bearkats	0	3	8	0	11
Gamecocks	7	7	0	7	21

at AmFirst Stadium, Jacksonville, AL

- Date: November 23
- Game time: 11:00 a.m. CDT
- Game weather: Sunny 51 °F (11 °C)
- Game attendance: 16,312
- Referee: Garrett Dickerson
- TV announcers (CBSSN): Jordan Kent (play-by-play) and Logan Ryan (analyst)

Game information

First quarter

- JSU – Tyler Huff 3-yard run (Garrison Rippa kick), 9:45. Gamecocks 7–0. Drive: 14 plays, 75 yards, 5:15.

Second quarter

- SHSU – Christian Pavon 34-yard field goal, 9:12. Gamecocks 7–3. Drive: 9 plays, 41 yards, 4:53.
- JSU – Tyler Huff 38-yard run (Garrison Rippa kick), 5:14. Gamecocks 14–3. Drive: 10 plays, 75 yards, 3:58.

Third quarter

- SHSU – Hunter Watson 21-yard run (Hunter Watson run for two-point conversation), 8:16. Gamecocks 14–11. Drive: 12 plays, 78 yards, 6:37.

Fourth quarter

- JSU – Tyler Huff 7-yard run (Garrison Rippa kick), 11:31. Gamecocks 21–11. Drive: 14 plays, 80 yards, 6:07.

Statistics	SHSU	JVST
First downs	16	20
Total yards	259	332
Rushing yards	175	278
Passing yards	84	54
Passing: Comp–Att–Int	13-26	9-12
Turnovers	0	1
Time of possession	31:05	28:55

Team	Category	Player	Statistics
Sam Houston	Passing	Hunter Watson	13/25, 84 yards
Sam Houston	Rushing	Hunter Watson	21 carries, 105 yards, 1TD
Sam Houston	Receiving	Noah Smith	6 receptions, 65 yards
Jacksonville State	Passing	Tyler Huff	9/12, 54 yards
Jacksonville State	Rushing	Tyler Huff	30 carries, 177 yards, 3TD
Jacksonville State	Receiving	Sean Brown	1 reception, 22 yards

=== vs. Liberty ===
Game Twelve – Liberty Flames (8–2) vs. Sam Houston Bearkats (8–3) – Game summary

Quarter	1	2	3	4	Total
Flames	2	7	0	9	18
Bearkats	3	14	3	0	20

at Bowers Stadium, Huntsville, TX

- Date: November 29
- Game time: 2:30 p.m. CDT
- Game weather: Sunny, 53 °F (12 °C)
- Game attendance: 8,651
- Referee: Rodney Burnette
- TV announcers (CBSSN): Alex Del Barrio (play-by-play), Taylor McHargue (analyst)

Game information

First quarter

- (10:30) SHSU – Christian Pavon 39-yard field goal (Drive: 10 plays, 53 yards, 4:30; SHSU 3–0)
- (2:34) LIB - Team Safety (Drive: 2 plays, -1 yards, 0:41; SHSU 3–2)

Second quarter

- (10:14) SHSU – Simeon Evans 17 yard pass from Hunter Watson, Christian Pavon kick (Drive: 13 plays, 87 yards, 4:50; SHSU 10–2)
- (6:45) SHSU – Simeon Evans 2 yard pass from Hunter Watson, Christian Pavon kick (Drive: 5 plays, 31 yards, 2:29; SHSU 17–2)
- (1:14) LIB – Elijah Canion 10 yard pass from Kaidon Salter, Colin Karhu kick (Drive: 7 plays, 51 yards, 2:10; SHSU 17–9)

Third quarter

- (5:13) SHSU – Christian Pavon 38-yard field goal (Drive: 8 plays, 36 yards, 4:39; SHSU 20-9)

Fourth quarter

- (7:20) LIB – Colin Karhu 43-yard field goal (Drive: 11 plays, 43 yards, 2:40; SHSU 20-12)
- (1:10) LIB – Kaidon Salter 33 yard run, Two-Point Pass Conversion Failed (Drive: 6 plays, 64 yards, 1:06; SHSU 20-18)

Statistics	LIB	SHSU
First downs	18	18
Total yards	262	333
Rushing yards	179	131
Passing yards	83	202
Passing: Comp–Att–Int	12-37-2	19-34-1
Time of possession	24:42	35:18

Team	Category	Player	Statistics
Liberty	Passing	Kaidon Salter	12/35, 83 yards, 1 TD, 2 INT
Liberty	Rushing	Quinton Cooley	19 carries, 90 yards
Liberty	Receiving	Reese Smith	3 receptions, 26 yards
Sam Houston	Passing	Hunter Watson	19/33, 202 yards, 2 TD, 1 INT
Sam Houston	Rushing	Jay Ducker	24 carries, 96 yards
Sam Houston	Receiving	Simeon Evans	6 receptions, 83 yards, 2 TDs

=== vs. Georgia Southern (New Orleans Bowl) ===
2024 R+L Carriers New Orleans Bowl
Georgia Southern Eagles (8-4, 6-2) at Sam Houston Bearkats (9-3, 6-2)

Quarter	1	2	3	4	Total
Eagles	0	10	9	7	26
Bearkats	7	14	0	10	31

at Caesars Superdome • New Orleans, Louisiana

- Date: Thursday, December 19, 2024
- Game time: 6:00 p.m. CST
- Game weather: Indoors, 64 °F (18 °C)
- Game attendance: 13,151
- Referee: David Seigle
- TV announcers (ESPN2): Jorge Sedano (play-by-play) Orlando Franklin (analyst)

Game information

First quarter

- (12:02) SHSU– Jaylon Jimmerson 29-yard interception return, Christian Pavon kick. SHSU 7–0. Drive: 1 play, 0 yards, 0:07.

Second quarter

- (9:15) GASO- Josh Dallas 17-yard pass from JC French, Gavin Stewart kick. Tied 7–7. Drive: 11 plays, 80 yards, 5:16.
- (5:46) SHSU- Simeon Evans 33-yard pass from Hunter Watson, Christian Pavon kick. SHSU 14–7. Drive: 8 plays, 75 yards, 3:29.
- (3:09) SHSU- Hunter Watson 2-yard run, Christian Pavon kick. SHSU 21–7. Drive: 4 plays, 13 yards, 1:43.
- (0:00) GASO- Gavin Stewart 49-yard field goal. SHSU 21–10. Drive: 10 plays, 55 yards, 1:04.

Third quarter

- (7:14) GASO- Jaylen White 1-yard run, Two-Point Conversion failed. SHSU 21–16. Drive: 5 plays, 56 yards, 2:53.
- (0:05) GASO- Gavin Stewart 49-yard field goal. SHSU 21–19. Drive: 8 plays, 26 yards, 3:56.

Fourth quarter

- (11:37) SHSU- Hunter Watson 1-yard run, Christian Pavon kick. SHSU 28–19. Drive: 8 plays, 88 yards, 3:28.
- (1:57) SHSU- Christian Pavon 21-yard field goal. SHSU 31–19. Drive: 8 plays, 28 yards, 3:25.
- (0:09) GASO- JC French 1-yard run, Gavin Stewart kick. SHSU 31–26. Drive: 9 plays, 73 yards, 1:48.

Statistics	GASO	SHSU
First downs	23	15
Total yards	393	267
Rushing yards	181	54
Passing yards	212	213
Passing: Comp–Att–Int	20-33-4	23-28
Time of possession	31:49	28:11

Team	Category	Player	Statistics
Georgia Southern	Passing	JC French	20/33, 212 yards 1 TD, 4 INT
Georgia Southern	Rushing	Jalen White	16 carries, 90 yards, 1TD
Georgia Southern	Receiving	Derwin Burgess Jr.	6 receptions, 56 yards
Sam Houston	Passing	Hunter Watson	23/28, 213 yards, 1 TD
Sam Houston	Rushing	Jay Ducker	10 carries, 26 yards
Sam Houston	Receiving	Simeon Evans	7 receptions, 85 yards, 1TD
