= 2024 New Orleans Bowl =

Postseason college football bowl game

2024 R+L Carriers New Orleans Bowl
- 24th New Orleans Bowl
Georgia Southern Eagles	Sam Houston Bearkats
(8–4)	(9–3)
Sun Belt	CUSA
26	31
Head coach: Clay Helton	Head coach: Brad Cornelsen (interim)
	1	2	3	4	Total
Georgia Southern	0	10	9	7	26
Sam Houston	7	14	0	10	31
- Date: December 19, 2024
- Season: 2024
- Stadium: Caesars Superdome
- Location: New Orleans, Louisiana
- MVP: Jaylon Jimmerson (DB, Sam Houston)
- Favorite: Georgia Southern by 3.5
- Referee: David Siegle (MAC)
- Attendance: 13,151

United States TV coverage
- Network: ESPN2; ESPN Radio
- Announcers: Jorge Sedano (play-by-play), Orlando Franklin (analyst), and Morgan Uber (sideline) (ESPN2); Dave Neal (play-by-play) and Aaron Murray (analyst) (ESPN Radio)

The 2024 New Orleans Bowl was a college football bowl game played on December 19, 2024, at the Caesars Superdome located in New Orleans, Louisiana. The 24th annual New Orleans Bowl featured Georgia Southern and Sam Houston. The game began at approximately 6:00 p.m. CST and aired on ESPN2. The New Orleans Bowl was one of the 2024–25 bowl games concluding the 2024 FBS football season. Sponsored by freight shipping company R+L Carriers, the game was officially known as the R+L Carriers New Orleans Bowl.

== Teams ==
Consistent with conference tie-ins, the game featured the Sam Houston Bearkats from Conference USA and the Georgia Southern Eagles from the Sun Belt Conference.

This was the first time that the Eagles and Bearkats ever played each other.

=== Sam Houston Bearkats ===
Sam Houston compiled an overall record of 9–3 during the regular season (6–2 in conference). Their losses were to UCF, Western Kentucky, and Jacksonville State. The Bearkats did not face any ranked opponents. Brad Cornelsen was named interim head coach for the New Orleans Bowl, after K. C. Keeler departed in early December for Temple. This was Sam Houston's first bowl game as a member of the Football Bowl Subdivision. Their most recent prior bowl win, which occurred when they competed in the National Association of Intercollegiate Athletics (NAIA), was in the 1956 Refrigerator Bowl.

=== Georgia Southern Eagles ===
Georgia Southern finished their season with an 8–4 record (6–2 in conference). Their four losses were to Boise State, Ole Miss, Old Dominion, and Troy. Ole Miss was the only ranked team the Eagles faced. This was Georgia Southern's third consecutive season with a bowl appearance; they previously appeared in one New Orleans Bowl, winning the 2020 edition.

== Game summary ==
2024 R+L Carriers New Orleans Bowl

Quarter	1	2	3	4	Total
Georgia Southern	0	10	9	7	26
Sam Houston	7	14	0	10	31

at Caesars Superdome • New Orleans, Louisiana

- Date: Thursday, December 19, 2024
- Game time: 6:03 p.m. CST
- Game weather: Indoor • Temperature: 64 °F (18 °C)
- Game attendance: 13,151
- Referee: David Seigle
- TV announcers (ESPN2): Jorge Sedano (play-by-play), Orlando Franklin (analyst), and Morgan Uber (sideline)
- Box score

Game information

First Quarter

- (12:02) SHSU – Jaylon Jimmerson 29 yard interception return, Christian Pavon kick (Drive: 1 plays, 0 yards, 0:07; Sam Houston 7–0)

Second Quarter

- (9:15) GASO – Josh Dallas 17 yard pass from JC French, Gavin Stewart kick (Drive: 11 plays, 80 yards, 5:16; Tied 7–7)
- (5:46) SHSU – Simeon Evans 33 yard pass from Hunter Watson, Christian Pavon kick (Drive: 8 plays, 75 yards, 3:29; Sam Houston 14–7)
- (3:09) SHSU – Hunter Watson 2 yard run, Christian Pavon kick (Drive: 4 plays, 13 yards, 1:43; Sam Houston 21–7)
- (0:00) GASO – Gavin Stewart 49 yard field goal (Drive: 10 plays, 55 yards, 1:04; Sam Houston 21–10)

Third Quarter

- (7:14) GASO – Jalen White 1 yard run, failed two-point run conversion (Drive: 5 plays, 56 yards, 2:53; Sam Houston 21–16)
- (0:05) GASO – Gavin Stewart 49 yard field goal (Drive: 8 plays, 26 yards, 3:56; Sam Houston 21–19)

Fourth Quarter

- (11:37) SHSU – Hunter Watson 1 yard run, Christian Pavon kick (Drive: 8 plays, 88 yards, 3:28; Sam Houston 28–19)
- (1:57) SHSU – Christian Pavon 21 yard field goal (Drive: 8 plays, 28 yards, 3:25; Sam Houston 31–19)
- (0:09) GASO – JC French 1 yard run, Gavin Stewart kick (Drive: 9 plays, 73 yards, 1:48; Sam Houston 31–26)

=== Statistics ===
Statistics	GSU	SHSU
First downs	23	15
Plays–yards	77–393	60–267
Rushes–yards	42–181	32–54
Passing yards	212	213
Passing: comp–att–int	20–35–4	23–28–0
Time of possession	31:49	28:11

Team	Category	Player	Statistics
Georgia Southern	Passing	JC French	20/33, 212 yards, 1 TD, 4 INT
Georgia Southern	Rushing	Jalen White	16 carries, 90 yards, 1 TD
Georgia Southern	Receiving	Derwin Burgess Jr.	6 receptions, 56 yards
Sam Houston	Passing	Hunter Watson	23/28, 213 yards, 1 TD
Sam Houston	Rushing	Jay Ducker	10 carries, 26 yards
Sam Houston	Receiving	Simeon Evans	7 receptions, 85 yards, 1 TD

== See also ==
- 2025 Sugar Bowl, contested at the same venue 2 weeks later
