= Brad Cornelsen =

American football player and coach

Current position
- Title: Head Coach
- Team: Enid High School

Biographical details
- Born: Texhoma, Oklahoma

Playing career
- 1995–1998: Missouri Southern
- Position: Quarterback

Coaching career (HC unless noted)
- 1999: Missouri Southern (SA)
- 2000: Northeastern State (SA)
- 2001: Northwest Missouri State (GA)
- 2001–2002: Oklahoma State (GA)
- 2003–2006: Illinois State (WR)
- 2007: Illinois State (QB)
- 2008: Oklahoma State (QC)
- 2009–2011: Northeastern State (OC)
- 2012–2014: Memphis (QB)
- 2015: Memphis (Co-OC/QB)
- 2016–2021: Virginia Tech (OC/QB)
- 2023–2024: Sam Houston (OC)
- 2024: Sam Houston (Interim HC/OC)
- 2025–present: Enid HS (OK)

Head coaching record
- Overall: 1–0
- Bowls: 1–0

Accomplishments and honors

Awards
- Missouri Southern State Athletics Hall of Fame (2014)

Brad Cornelsen is a current American football coach and former player who was recently the offensive coordinator at Sam Houston State University and currently is the head coach and assistant athletic director at Enid High School in Enid, OK. He was the former offensive coordinator and quarterbacks coach at Virginia Tech from 2016 to 2021.

== Coaching career ==
After playing quarterback for Division II, Missouri Southern, Cornelsen began his career in coaching as a student assistant for his alma mater in 1999. In 2000, he served as a student assistant again this time for Northeastern State. In the spring of 2001, he worked as a graduate assistant for Northwest Missouri State under College Football Hall of Famer Mel Tjeerdsma. In the fall, he went to Oklahoma State in the same capacity and remained there until the end of the 2002 season. In 2003 he became a part of the Redbirds staff where he would stay until 2007. He spent his first four seasons at Illinois State as the wide receivers coach before spending his final season as the quarterbacks coach. In 2008 the Oklahoma native returned to Oklahoma State as a quality control coach. In 2009, he was given the opportunity to be an offensive coordinator for Northeastern State. He remained with the Riverhawks until the end of the 2011 season. In 2012, he joined Justin Fuente's staff in Memphis as the quarterbacks coach, he previously worked with Fuente at Illinois State. In 2015, he was given a promotion and added the title of co-offensive coordinator, where he coached quarterback Paxton Lynch. He was also nominated for the Broyles Award. In 2016, he followed Fuente to Virginia Tech and was named the offensive coordinator and quarterbacks coach. He was let go following the 2021 season.

Cornelsen was hired on January 17, 2023, as the offensive coordinator for the Sam Houston State Bearkats. He took over as interim head coach on December 1, 2024, after K. C. Keeler departed to become head coach at Temple University.

== Head coaching record ==
Year	Team	Overall	Conference	Standing	Bowl/playoffs
Sam Houston Bearkats (Conference USA) (2024)
2024	Sam Houston	1–0	0–0		W New Orleans
Sam Houston:		1–0	0–0		
Total:		1–0			
