= Rod Smith =

Rod, Rodney or Roderick Smith may refer to:

== Arts and entertainment ==
- Rod Smith (poet) (born 1962), American poet and editor (edits the journal Aerial and publishes Edge Books)
- Rodney Smith (photographer) (1947–2016), portrait photographer
- R. T. Smith (Rodney Theodore Smith, 1947–2024), American poet and editor
- Roots Manuva (born 1972), British rapper born Rodney Smith

== Sports ==
=== Gridiron football ===
- Rod Smith (wide receiver) (born 1970), American football wide receiver
- Rod Smith (defensive back) (born 1970), American football defensive back
- Rod Smith (running back) (born 1992), American football running back
- Rodney Smith (wide receiver) (born 1990), American football wide receiver
- Rodney Smith (running back) (born 1996), American football running back
- Rod Smith (Canadian football) (1925–2016), Canadian Football League player
- Rod Smith (American football coach) (born 1973), American football coach and quarterback

=== Other sports ===
- Rod Smith (sportscaster), sportscaster with The Sports Network
- Rodney Smith (skateboarder), American skateboarder, co-founder of Zoo York
- Rodney Smith (cricketer) (born 1944), English cricketer
- Rodney Smith (wrestler) (born 1966), American Olympic wrestler
- Rod Smith (ice hockey) (1894–1961), ice hockey player

== Others ==
- Rod Smith (politician) (born 1949), Florida state senator and chair of the Florida Democratic Party
- Rod Smith (R/C modeling pioneer) (born 1926), R/C modeling pioneer
- Roderick Smith (RCAF officer) (1922–2002), flying ace of the Royal Canadian Air Force during the Second World War
- Gipsy Smith (Rodney Smith, 1860–1947), British evangelist
- Rodney K. Smith (1951–2020), American academic
- Rodney Smith, Baron Smith (1914–1998), British surgeon
- Rodney Smith (judge) (born 1974), federal judge in Florida
- Roderick Smith (professor) (1947-2024), English railway mechanical engineer and professor
