= 2024 Jacksonville State Gamecocks football team =

American college football season

2024 Jacksonville State Gamecocks football

C-USA champion

C-USA Championship, W 52–12 vs. Western Kentucky

Cure Bowl, L 27–30 vs. Ohio
- Conference: Conference USA
- Record: 9–5 (7–1 C-USA)
- Head coach: Rich Rodriguez (3rd season; regular season); Rod Smith (interim; bowl game)
- Offensive coordinator: Rod Smith (3rd season)
- Offensive scheme: Spread option
- Defensive coordinator: Luke Olson (1st season)
- Base defense: 3–3–5
- Home stadium: AmFirst Stadium

2024 Conference USA football standings
	Conf.			Overall
Team	W		L	W		L
Jacksonville State y$	7	–	1	9	–	5
Western Kentucky y	6	–	2	8	–	6
Sam Houston	6	–	2	10	–	3
Liberty	5	–	3	8	–	4
Louisiana Tech	4	–	4	5	–	8
UTEP	3	–	5	3	–	9
FIU	3	–	5	4	–	8
New Mexico State	2	–	6	3	–	9
Middle Tennessee	2	–	6	3	–	9
Kennesaw State*	2	–	6	2	–	10
Championship: Jacksonville State 52, Western Kentucky 12
$ – Conference champion; y – Championship game participant; * – Ineligible for postseason play due to FCS-to-FBS transition rules

The 2024 Jacksonville State Gamecocks football team represented Jacksonville State University in Conference USA (C-USA) during the 2024 NCAA Division I FBS football season. The Gamecocks were led by Rich Rodriguez in his third year as the head coach. The Gamecocks played their home games at AmFirst Stadium, located in Jacksonville, Alabama.

== Preseason ==
=== C-USA media poll ===
The Conference USA preseason media poll was released on July 19. The Gamecocks were predicted to finish third in the conference.

== Schedule ==
Date	Time	Opponent	Site	TV	Result	Attendance
August 29	7:00 p.m.	Coastal Carolina*	AmFirst Stadium; Jacksonville, AL	CBSSN	L 27–55	18,977
September 7	2:30 p.m.	at No. 22 Louisville*	L&N Stadium; Louisville, KY	ACCNX/ESPN+	L 14–49	48,575
September 14	6:00 p.m.	at Eastern Michigan*	Rynearson Stadium; Ypsilanti, MI	ESPN+	L 34–37 ^{2OT}	17,501
September 21	2:00 p.m.	Southern Miss*^{†}	AmFirst Stadium; Jacksonville, AL	ESPN+	W 44–7	21,788
October 4	6:00 p.m.	at Kennesaw State	Fifth Third Bank Stadium; Kennesaw, GA	CBSSN	W 63–24	10,029
October 9	6:30 p.m.	New Mexico State	AmFirst Stadium; Jacksonville, AL	ESPN2	W 54–13	16,555
October 23	6:30 p.m.	Middle Tennessee	AmFirst Stadium; Jacksonville, AL	ESPN2	W 42–20	17,988
October 30	6:00 p.m.	at Liberty	Williams Stadium; Lynchburg, VA	CBSSN	W 31–21	18,069
November 9	3:30 p.m.	at Louisiana Tech	Joe Aillet Stadium; Ruston, LA	CBSSN	W 44–37 ^{OT}	16,345
November 16	1:00 p.m.	FIU	AmFirst Stadium; Jacksonville, AL	ESPN+	W 34–31	17,688
November 23	11:00 a.m.	Sam Houston	AmFirst Stadium; Jacksonville, AL	CBSSN	W 21–11	16,312
November 30	3:00 p.m.	at Western Kentucky	Houchens Industries–L. T. Smith Stadium; Bowling Green, KY	ESPNU	L 17–19	6,547
December 6	6:00 p.m.	Western Kentucky	AmFirst Stadium; Jacksonville, AL (C-USA Championship Game)	CBSSN	W 52–12	15,628
December 20	11:00 a.m.	vs. Ohio*	Camping World Stadium; Orlando, FL (Cure Bowl)	ESPN	L 27–30	10,518
*Non-conference game; ^{†}Homecoming; Rankings from AP Poll and CFP Rankings released prior to game; All times are in Central time

== Game summaries ==
=== vs. Coastal Carolina ===
Game One – Coastal Carolina Chanticleers (0-0) at Jacksonville State Gamecocks (0-0) – Game summary

Quarter	1	2	3	4	Total
Chanticleers	17	14	10	14	55
Gamecocks	3	7	0	17	27

at AmFirst Stadium • Jacksonville, AL

- Date: August 29
- Game time: 7:00 p.m.
- Game weather: 87 °F (31 °C)
- Game attendance: 18,977
- Referee: Rodney Burnette
- TV announcers (CBSSN): Jordan Kent (play-by-play) and Logan Ryan (analyst)

Game information

First quarter

- (11:06) CCU – Kade Hensley 25-yard field goal (Drive: 9 plays, 50 yards, 3:45; Coastal Carolina 3-0)
- (5:50) JVST – Garrison Rippa 49-yard field goal (Drive: 7 plays, 25 yards, 2:29; Tied 3-3)
- (1:12) CCU – Tray Taylor 36-yard pass from Ethan Vasko (Kade Hensley kick) (Drive: 8 plays, 77 yards, 4:30; Coastal Carolina 10-3)
- (1:01) CCU – Clev Lubin 17-yard fumble return (Kade Hensley kick) (Coastal Carolina 17-3)

Second quarter

- (11:48) CCU – Ethan Vasko 4-yard run (Kade Hensley kick) (Drive: 5 plays, 80 yards, 1:52; Coastal Carolina 24-3)
- (2:20) CCU – Braydon Bennett 2-yard run (Kade Hensley kick) (Drive: 9 plays, 48 yards, 4:49; Coastal Carolina 31-3)
- (0:19) JVST – Cole Fuller 1-yard run (Garrison Rippa kick) (Drive: 9 plays, 75 yards, 2:01; Coastal Carolina 31-10)

Third quarter

- (9:11) CCU – Braydon Bennett 2-yard run (Kade Hensley kick) (Drive: 9 plays, 79 yards, 4:39; Coastal Carolina 38-10)
- (3:13) CCU – Kade Hensley 39-yard field goal (Drive: 4 plays, 0 yards, 2:13; Coastal Carolina 41-10)

Fourth quarter

- (13:10) JVST – Garrison Rippa 26-yard field goal (Drive: 14 plays, 67 yards, 5:03; Coastal Carolina 41-13)
- (8:34) CCU – Jameson Tucker 37-yard pass from Ethan Vasko (Kade Hensley kick) (Drive: 9 plays, 75 yards, 4:36; Coastal Carolina 48-13)
- (8:03) JVST – Michael Pettway 92-yard pass from Tyler Huff (Garrison Rippa kick) (Drive: 1 play, 92 yards, 0:24; Coastal Carolina 48-20)
- (2:18) CCU – Senika McKie 9-yard pass from Noah Kim (Kade Hensley kick) (Drive: 9 plays, 75 yards, 5:45; Coastal Carolina 55-20)
- (1:06) JVST – Tre Stewart 38-yard run (Garrison Rippa kick) (Drive: 4 plays, 75 yards, 1:12; Coastal Carolina 55-27)

Statistics	CCU	JVST
First downs	25	16
Total yards	76–555	57–357
Rushing yards	56–297	30–123
Passing yards	258	234
Passing: Comp–Att–Int	13–20–1	14–27–2
Time of possession	39:51	20:09

Team	Category	Player	Statistics
Coastal Carolina	Passing	Ethan Vasko	12/19, 249 yards, 2 TD, INT
Coastal Carolina	Rushing	Ja'Vin Simpkins	12 carries, 80 yards
Coastal Carolina	Receiving	Tray Taylor	3 receptions, 98 yards, TD
Jacksonville State	Passing	Tyler Huff	7/14, 173 yards, TD, 2 INT
Jacksonville State	Rushing	Tre Stewart	4 carries, 62 yards, TD
Jacksonville State	Receiving	Michael Pettway	1 reception, 92 yards, TD

=== at No. 22 Louisville ===
Game Two – Jacksonville State Gamecocks (0-1) at No. 22 Louisville Cardinals (1-0) – Game summary

Quarter	1	2	3	4	Total
Gamecocks	0	14	0	0	14
No. 22 Cardinals	14	14	7	14	49

at L&N Stadium • Louisville, KY

- Date: September 7, 2024
- Game time: 3:30 p.m. EST
- Game weather: Sunny • Temperature: 72 °F (22 °C) • Wind: N 12 mph
- Game attendance: 48,575
- Referee: Gary Peterson
- TV announcers (ACCNX/ESPN+): Justin Kutcher (play-by-play) and Charles Arbuckle (analyst)

Game information

First quarter

- (10:29) LOU – Donald Chaney 10-yard run (Brock Travelstead kick) (Drive: 9 plays, 62 yards, 4:26; Louisville 7–0)
- (3:57) LOU – Keyjuan Brown 22-yard run (Brock Travelstead kick) (Drive: 3 plays, 52 yards, 1:24; Louisville 14–0)

Second quarter

- (14:24) JVST – Sean Brown 11-yard pass from Tyler Huff (Garrison Rippa kick) (Drive: 11 plays, 75 yards, 4:34; Louisville 14–7)
- (9:47) LOU – Maurice Turner 1-yard run (Brock Travelstead kick) (Drive: 9 plays, 70 yards, 4:33; Louisville 21–7)
- (2:37) LOU – Duane Martin 2-yard run (Brock Travelstead kick) (Drive: 7 plays, 80 yards, 3:47; Louisville 28–7)
- (0:36) JVST – Tyler Huff 15-yard run (Garrison Rippa kick) (Drive: 6 plays, 75 yards, 2:01; Louisville 28–14)

Third quarter

- (8:58) LOU – Chris Bell 48-yard pass from Tyler Shough (Brock Travelstead kick) (Drive: 8 plays, 77 yards, 4:26; Louisville 35–14)

Fourth quarter

- (7:43) LOU – Mark Redman 12-yard pass from Tyler Shough (Brock Travelstead kick) (Drive: 11 plays, 96 yards, 7:01; Louisville 42–14)
- (1:50) LOU – Duke Watson 40-yard run (Brock Travelstead kick) (Drive: 6 plays, 79 yards, 3:48; Louisville 49–14)

Statistics	JVST	LOU
First downs	19	29
Total yards	290	610
Rushing yards	130	233
Passing yards	160	377
Passing: Comp–Att–Int	17–28–1	23–35–0
Time of possession	23:37	36:23

Team	Category	Player	Statistics
Jacksonville State	Passing	Tyler Huff	17–27, 160 yards, TD, INT
Jacksonville State	Rushing	Tyler Huff	18 carries, 101 yards, TD
Jacksonville State	Receiving	Michael Pettway	4 receptions, 30 yards
Louisville	Passing	Tyler Shough	21–33, 349 yards, 2 TD
Louisville	Rushing	Maurice Turner	12 carries, 60 yards, TD
Louisville	Receiving	Ja'Corey Brooks	6 receptions, 89 yards

=== at Eastern Michigan ===
Game Three – Jacksonville State Gamecocks (0–2) at Eastern Michigan Eagles (1–1) – Game summary

Quarter	1	2	3	4	OT	2OT	Total
Gamecocks	7	13	0	11	3	0	34
Eagles	14	14	3	0	3	3	37

at Rynearson Stadium • Ypsilanti, MI

- Date: September 14, 2024
- Game time: 6:00 p.m. CST
- Game weather: Sunny • Temperature: 80 °F (27 °C) • Wind: E at 8 miles per hour (13 km/h)
- Game attendance: 17,501
- Referee: Rich Edwards
- TV announcers (ESPN+): Doug Sherman (play-by-play) and Tyoka Jackson (analyst)

Game information

First quarter

- (10:11) JVST – Tre Stewart 5-yard run, Garrison Rippa kick (Drive: 13 plays, 75 yards, 4:49; Jacksonville State 7–0)
- (6:43) EMU – Delbert Mimms III 5-yard run, Jesus Gomez kick (Drive: 10 plays, 75 yards, 3:28; Tied 7–7)
- (1:21) EMU – Elijah Jackson-Anderson 24-yard pass from Cole Snyder, Jesus Gomez kick (Drive: 10 plays, 77 yards, 3:48; Eastern Michigan 14–7)

Second quarter

- (13:19) JVST – Garrison Rippa 35-yard field goal (Drive: 8 plays, 53 yards, 3:02; Eastern Michigan 14–10)
- (11:39) JVST – Cam Vaughn 37-yard pass from Tyler Huff, Garrison Rippa kick (Drive: 1 play, 37 yards, 0:09; Jacksonville State 17–14)
- (8:10) EMU – Max Reese 34-yard pass from Cole Snyder, Jesus Gomez kick (Drive: 7 plays, 75 yards, 3:29; Eastern Michigan 21–17)
- (3:22) EMU – Max Reese 22-yard pass from Terry Lockett, Jesus Gomez kick (Drive: 6 plays, 55 yards, 2:47; Eastern Michigan 28–17)
- (0:48) JVST – Garrison Rippa 48-yard field goal (Drive: 7 plays, 45 yards, 2:34; Eastern Michigan 28–20)

Third quarter

- (1:00) EMU – Jesus Gomez 41-yard field goal (Drive: 14 plays, 41 yards, 7:14; Eastern Michigan 31–20)

Fourth quarter

- (14:10) JVST – Michael Pettway 32-yard pass from Tyler Huff, Brock Rechsteiner pass (Drive: 6 plays, 75 yards, 1:50; Eastern Michigan 31–28)
- (0:34) JVST – Garrison Rippa 51-yard field goal (Drive: 7 plays, 37 yards, 1:18; Tied 31–31)

Overtime

- (0:00) EMU – Jesus Gomez 40-yard field goal (Drive: 4 plays, 3 yards, 0:00; Eastern Michigan 34–31)
- (0:00) JVST – Garrison Rippa 40-yard field goal (Drive: 6 plays, 3 yards, 0:00; Tied 34–34)

Double overtime

- (0:00) EMU – Jesus Gomez 34-yard field goal (Drive: 4 plays, 9 yards, 0:00; Eastern Michigan 37–34)

Statistics	JVST	EMU
First downs	24	27
Total yards	423	447
Rushing yards	112	152
Passing yards	311	295
Passing: Comp–Att–Int	24–34–0	27–39–0
Time of possession	21:15	38:45

Team	Category	Player	Statistics
Jacksonville State	Passing	Tyler Huff	24/34, 311 yards, 2 TD
Jacksonville State	Rushing	Tyler Huff	14 carries, 80 yards
Jacksonville State	Receiving	Cam Vaughn	6 receptions, 94 yards, TD
Eastern Michigan	Passing	Cole Snyder	26/37, 273 yards, 2 TD
Eastern Michigan	Rushing	Elijah Jackson-Arnold	24 carries, 87 yards
Eastern Michigan	Receiving	Oran Singleton	8 receptions, 89 yards

=== vs Southern Miss ===
Game Four – Southern Miss Golden Eagles (1–2) at Jacksonville State Gamecocks (0–3) – Game summary

Quarter	1	2	3	4	Total
Golden Eagles	0	7	0	0	7
Gamecocks	14	7	23	0	44

at AmFirst Stadium • Jacksonville, AL

- Date: Saturday September 21, 2024
- Game time: 2:00 p.m.
- Game weather: Sunny • Temperature: 91 °F (33 °C) • Wind: NW at 4 miles per hour (6.4 km/h)
- Game attendance: 21,788
- Referee: Scott Broadway
- TV announcers (ESPN+): Eli Gold (play-by-play) and Bill Clark (analyst)

Game information

First quarter

- (11:44) JVST – Tre Stewart 32-yard run, Garrison Rippa kick (Drive: 3 plays, 65 yards, 0:55; Jacksonville State 7–0)
- (4:44) JVST – Anwar Lewis 7-yard run, Garrison Rippa kick (Drive: 9 plays, 59 yards, 3:25; Jacksonville State 14–0)

Second quarter

- (10:39) USM – John White 2-yard run, Connor Gibbs kick (Drive: 10 plays, 43 yards, 5:02; Jacksonville State 14–7)
- (6:58) JVST – Tyler Huff 6-yard run, Garrison Rippa kick (Drive: 9 plays, 75 yards, 3:41; Jacksonville State 21–7)

Third quarter

- (14:15) JVST – Brock Rechsteiner 85-yard pass from Tyler Huff (Drive: 2 plays, 75 yards, 0:45; Jacksonville State 27–7)
- (12:05) JVST – Anwar Lewis 2-yard run, Garrison Rippa kick (Drive: 4 plays, 26 yards, 1:23; Jacksonville State 34–7)
- (6:44) JVST – Garrison Rippa 43-yard field goal (Drive: 7 plays, 40 yards, 3:25; Jacksonville State 37–7)
- (2:19) JVST – Tre Stewart 5-yard run, Garrison Rippa kick (Drive: 5 plays, 63 yards, 2:02; Jacksonville State 44–7)

Fourth quarter

No scoring plays

Statistics	USM	JVST
First downs	16	22
Plays–yards	60–246	64–509
Rushes–yards	37–114	48–273
Passing yards	132	236
Passing: Comp–Att–Int	12–23–4	14–16–1
Time of possession	28:51	31:09

Team	Category	Player	Statistics
Southern Miss	Passing	John White	9/18, 117 yards, 2 INT
Southern Miss	Rushing	Kenyon Clay	10 carries, 49 yards
Southern Miss	Receiving	Tiaquelin Mims	6 receptions, 43 yards
Jacksonville State	Passing	Tyler Huff	14/16, 236 yards, TD, INT
Jacksonville State	Rushing	Tre Stewart	16 carries, 96 yards, 2 TD
Jacksonville State	Receiving	Brock Rechsteiner	2 receptions, 90 yards, TD

=== at Kennesaw State ===
Game Five – Kennesaw State Owls (0–4) at Jacksonville State Gamecocks (1–3) – Game summary

Quarter	1	2	3	4	Total
Gamecocks	7	14	21	21	63
Owls	3	14	0	7	24

at Fifth Third Stadium • Kennesaw, GA

- Date: Friday October 4, 2024
- Game time: 6:00 p.m.
- Game weather: Cloudy • Temperature: 74 °F (23 °C)
- Game attendance: 10,029
- Referee: Rory Bernard
- TV announcers (CBSSN): Dave Ryan (play-by-play) and Logan Ryan (analyst)

Game information

First quarter

- (10:54) JSU – Tre Stewart 1-yard run, Garrison Rippa kick (Drive: 6 plays, 59 yards, 2:25; Jacksonville State 7–0)
- (3:57) KENN – Austin Welch 25-yard field goal (Drive: 13 plays, 62 yards, 6:50; Jacksonville State 7–3)

Second quarter

- (11:23) JSU – Tyler Huff 6-yard run, Garrison Rippa kick (Drive: 8 plays, 50 yards, 2:06; Jacksonville State 14–3)
- (7:08) JSU – Tre Stewart 9-yard run, Garrison Rippa kick (Drive: 6 plays, 78 yards, 1:46; Jacksonville State 21–3)
- (6:56) KENN – Qua Ashley 93-yard kickoff return, Austin Welch kick (Jacksonville State 21–10)
- (1:49) KENN – Carson Kent 7-yard pass from Davis Bryson, Austin Welch kick (Drive: 10 plays, 67 yards, 3:48; Jacksonville State 21–17)

Third quarter

- (10:56) JSU – Tyler Huff 14-yard run, Garrison Rippa kick (Drive: 11 plays, 75 yards, 4:04; Jacksonville State 28–17)
- (6:14) JSU – Tre Stewart 1-yard run, Garrison Rippa kick (Drive: 3 plays, 65 yards, 0:47; Jacksonville State 35–17)
- (0:23) JSU – Tyler Huff 19-yard run, Garrison Rippa kick (Drive: 9 plays, 68 yards, 3:59; Jacksonville State 42–17)

Fourth quarter

- (14:08) JSU – Jabari Mack 0-yard interception, Garrison Rippa kick (Jacksonville State 49–17)
- (12:29) KENN – Michael Benefield 1-yard run, Austin Welch kick (Drive: 4 plays, 68 yards, 1:35; Jacksonville State 49–24)
- (7:28) JSU – Tre Stewart 1-yard run, Garrison Rippa kick (Drive: 9 plays, 75 yards, 5:01; Jacksonville State 56–24)
- (1:22) JSU – Mike Franklin 23-yard run, Garrison Rippa kick (Drive: 5 plays, 42 yards, 2:56; Jacksonville State 63–24)

Statistics	JVST	KENN
First downs	31	13
Total yards	577	270
Rushing yards	384	189
Passing yards	193	81
Passing: Comp–Att–Int	16–25–0	7–16–3
Time of possession	28:38	31:22

Team	Category	Player	Statistics
Jacksonville State	Passing	Tyler Huff	16/25, 193 yards
Jacksonville State	Rushing	Tyler Huff	15 carries, 176 yards, 3 TD
Jacksonville State	Receiving	Cam Vaughn	7 receptions, 96 yards
Kennesaw State	Passing	Davis Bryson	6/14, 76 yards, TD, 3 INT
Kennesaw State	Rushing	Michael Benefield	17 carries, 112 yards, TD
Kennesaw State	Receiving	Jaden Robinson	2 receptions, 36 yards

=== vs New Mexico State ===
Game Six – New Mexico State Aggies (1–4) at Jacksonville State Gamecocks (2–3) – Game summary

Quarter	1	2	3	4	Total
Aggies	3	3	0	7	13
Gamecocks	7	26	14	7	54

at AmFirst Stadium • Jacksonville, AL

- Date: Wednesday October 9, 2024
- Game time: 6:30 p.m.
- Game weather: Clear • Temperature: 75 °F (24 °C) • Wind: N at 5 miles per hour (8.0 km/h)
- Game attendance: 16,555
- Referee: Ron Hudson
- TV announcers (ESPN2): Clay Matvick (play-by-play) and Steve Addazio (analyst)

Game information

First quarter

- NMSU – Abraham Montano 53-yard field goal, 8:16. Aggies 3–0. Drive: 7 plays, 41 yards, 3:01.
- JSU – Tre Stewart 10-yard run (Garrison Rippa kick), 6:37. Gamecocks 7–3. Drive: 5 plays, 75 yards, 1:39.

Second quarter

- JSU – Juwaun Campbell 0-yard safety, 14:51. Gamecocks 9–3.
- JSU – Tre Stewart 32-yard pass from Tyler Huff (Garrison Rippa kick), 12:10. Gamecocks 16–3. Drive: 7 plays, 55 yards, 2:32.
- NMSU – Abraham Montano 41-yard field goal, 5:20. Aggies 16–6. Drive: 7 plays, 43 yards, 3:08.
- JSU – Garrison Rippa 45-yard field goal, 2:51. Gamecocks 19–6. Drive: 7 plays, 48 yards, 2:29.
- JSU – Tre Stewart 48-yard run (Garrison Rippa kick), 1:09. Gamecocks 26–6. Drive: 3 plays, 82 yards, 0:26.
- JSU – Tyler Huff 2-yard run (Garrison Rippa kick), 0:20. Gamecocks 33–6. Drive: 3 plays, 20 yards, 0:34.

Third quarter

- JSU – Andrew Paul 28-yard run (Garrison Rippa kick), 9:42. Gamecocks 40–6. Drive: 5 plays, 73 yards, 2:32.
- JSU – Brock Rechsteiner 5-yard pass from Tyler Huff (Garrison Rippa kick), 3:45. Gamecocks 47–6. Drive: 7 plays, 33 yards, 4:03.

Fourth quarter

- JSU – Logan Smothers 72-yard run (Garrison Rippa kick), 14:46. Gamecocks 54–6. Drive: 2 plays, 76 yards, 0:52.
- NMSU – PJ Johnson III 21-yard pass from Parker Awad (Abraham Montano kick), 10:37. Gamecocks 54–13. Drive: 8 plays, 75 yards, 4:09.

Statistics	NMSU	JVST
First downs	22	28
Total yards	350	530
Rushing yards	206	334
Passing yards	144	196
Passing: Comp–Att–Int	12–26–1	11–18–0
Time of possession	30:04	29:56

Team	Category	Player	Statistics
New Mexico State	Passing	Parker Awad	9/16, 120 yards, TD, INT
New Mexico State	Rushing	Mike Washington	13 carries, 76 yards
New Mexico State	Receiving	PJ Johnson III	3 receptions, 84 yards, TD
Jacksonville State	Passing	Tyler Huff	11/18, 196 yards, 2 TD
Jacksonville State	Rushing	Tre Stewart	21 carries, 118 yards, 2 TD
Jacksonville State	Receiving	Michael Pettway	1 reception, 54 yards

=== vs Middle Tennessee ===
Game Seven – Middle Tennessee Blue Raiders (2–5) at Jacksonville State Gamecocks (3–3) – Game summary

Quarter	1	2	3	4	Total
Blue Raiders	10	0	3	7	20
Gamecocks	14	0	21	7	42

at AmFirst Stadium • Jacksonville, AL

- Date: Wednesday October 23, 2024
- Game time: 6:30 p.m.
- Game weather: Clear • Temperature: 73 °F (23 °C) • Wind: W 2 miles per hour (3.2 km/h)
- Game attendance: 17,988
- Referee: Douglas Mercer
- TV announcers (ESPN2): Clay Matvick (play-by-play) and Steve Addazio (analyst)

Game information

First quarter

- (12:50) MTSU – Holden Willis 61-yard pass from Nicholas Vattiato, Zeke Rankin kick (Drive: 4 plays, 75 yards, 2:10; Middle Tennessee 7–0)
- (10:58) JSU – Tyler Huff 49-yard run, Garrison Rippa kick (Drive: 6 plays, 75 yards, 1:52; Tied 7–7)
- (5:38) MTSU – Zeke Rankin 47-yard field goal (Drive: 10 plays, 46 yards, 5:20; Middle Tennessee 10–7)
- (1:02) JSU – Andrew Paul 4-yard run, Garrison Rippa kick (Drive: 12 plays, 75 yards, 4:36; Jacksonville State 14–10)

Second quarter

No scoring plays

Third quarter

- (13:59) JSU – Michael Pettway 7-yard pass from Tyler Huff, Garrison Rippa kick (Drive: 4 plays, 75 yards, 1:01; Jacksonville State 21–10)
- (9:13) MTSU – Zeke Rankin 41-yard field goal (Drive: 8 plays, 52 yards, 4:46; Jacksonville State 21–13)
- (5:34) JSU – Tyler Huff 2-yard run, Garrison Rippa kick (Drive: 9 plays, 75 yards, 3:39; Jacksonville State 28–13)
- (0:14) JSU – Tre Stewart 1-yard run, Garrison Rippa kick (Drive: 7 plays, 63 yards, 3:26; Jacksonville State 35–13)

Fourth quarter

- (11:33) MTSU – Myles Butler 4-yard pass from Nicholas Vattiato, Zeke Rankin kick (Drive: 8 plays, 75 yards, 3:41; Jacksonville State 35–20)
- (6:11) JSU – Andrew Paul 26-yard run, Garrison Rippa kick (Drive: 8 plays, 75 yards, 5:22; Jacksonville State 42–20)

Statistics	MTSU	JVST
First downs	17	30
Total yards	364	575
Rushing yards	67	438
Passing yards	297	137
Passing: Comp–Att–Int	25–36–0	10–18–0
Time of possession	29:56	30:04

Team	Category	Player	Statistics
Middle Tennessee	Passing	Nicholas Vattiato	25/36, 297 yards, 2 TD
Middle Tennessee	Rushing	Jaiden Credle	8 carries, 39 yards
Middle Tennessee	Receiving	Omari Kelly	8 receptions, 128 yards
Jacksonville State	Passing	Tyler Huff	10/18, 137 yards, TD
Jacksonville State	Rushing	Tre Stewart	21 carries, 210 yards, TD
Jacksonville State	Receiving	Cam Vaughn	4 receptions, 82 yards

=== at Liberty ===
Game Eight – Jacksonville State Gamecocks (4–3) at Liberty Flames (5–1) – Game summary

Quarter	1	2	3	4	Total
Gamecocks	7	7	10	7	31
Flames	7	7	0	7	21

at Williams Stadium • Lynchburg, VA

- Date: Wednesday October 30, 2024
- Game time: 6:00 p.m.
- Game weather: Sunny • Temperature: 66 °F (19 °C) • Wind: SW 5 miles per hour (8.0 km/h)
- Game attendance: 18,069
- Referee: Rodney Burnette
- TV announcers (CBSSN): Carter Blackburn (play-by-play) and Luke Kuechly (analyst)

Game information

First quarter

- (10:43) LIB – Vaughn Blue 25-yard run, Colin Karhu kick (Drive: 5 plays, 62 yards, 2:32; Liberty 7–0)
- (10:30) JVST – Tre Stewart 75-yard run, Garrison Rippa kick (Drive: 1 play, 75 yards, 0:13; Tied 7–7)

Second quarter

- (10:53) JVST – Tre Stewart 28-yard run, Garrison Rippa kick (Drive: 5 plays, 75 yards, 1:39; Jacksonville State 14–7)
- (4:16) LIB – Quinton Cooley 2-yard run, Colin Karhu kick (Drive: 12 plays, 75 yards, 6:37; Tied 14–14)

Third quarter

- (9:22) JVST – Garrison Rippa 25-yard field goal (Drive: 10 plays, 71 yards, 4:20; Jacksonville State 17–14)
- (2:35) JVST – Tre Stewart 1-yard run, Garrison Rippa kick (Drive: 11 plays, 87 yards, 4:20; Jacksonville State 24–14)

Fourth quarter

- (12:29) LIB – Jacob Jenkins 4-yard pass from Kaidon Salter, Colin Karhu kick (Drive: 13 plays, 78 yards, 5:05; Jacksonville State 24–21)
- (1:57) JVST – Tre Stewart 1-yard run, Garrison Rippa kick (Drive: 2 plays, 1 yard, 0:37; Jacksonville State 31–21)

Statistics	JVST	LIB
First downs	21	27
Total yards	458	420
Rushing yards	363	273
Passing yards	95	147
Passing: Comp–Att–Int	6–10–0	12–25–1
Time of possession	23:46	36:14

Team	Category	Player	Statistics
Jacksonville State	Passing	Tyler Huff	6/10, 95 yards
Jacksonville State	Rushing	Tre Stewart	27 carries, 232 yards, 4 TD
Jacksonville State	Receiving	Cam Vaughn	1 reception, 39 yards
Liberty	Passing	Kaidon Salter	12/25, 147 yards, TD, INT
Liberty	Rushing	Quinton Cooley	27 carries, 133 yards, TD
Liberty	Receiving	Elijah Canion	5 receptions, 63 yards

=== at Louisiana Tech ===
Game Nine – Jacksonville State Gamecocks (5–3) at Louisiana Tech Bulldogs (3–5) – Game summary

Quarter	1	2	3	4	OT	Total
Gamecocks	7	21	0	9	7	44
Bulldogs	7	14	9	7	0	37

at Joe Aillet Stadium • Ruston, LA

- Date: Saturday November 9, 2024
- Game time: 3:30 p.m.
- Game weather: Rain, 74 °F (23 °C)
- Game attendance: 16,345
- Referee: Garrett Dickerson
- TV announcers (CBSSN): Chris Lewis (play-by-play) and Randy Cross (analyst)

Game information

First quarter

- JVST – Andrew Paul 1-yard run (Garrison Rippa kick), 8:57. Gamecocks 7–0. Drive: 17 plays, 75 yards, 6:03.
- LT – Tru Edwards 86-yard pass from Evan Bullock (Buck Buchanan kick), 1:32. Tied 7–7. Drive: 1 play, 86 yards, 0:14.

Second quarter

- JVST – Tre Stewart 4-yard run (Garrison Rippa kick), 11:56. Gamecocks 14–7. Drive: 12 plays, 75 yards, 4:36.
- JVST – Tyler Huff 1-yard run (Garrison Rippa kick), 8:25. Gamecocks 21–7. Drive: 3 plays, 2 yards, 0:51.
- LT – Jimmy Holiday 2-yard run (Buck Buchanan kick), 4:59. Gamecocks 21–14. Drive: 8 plays, 75 yards, 3:18.
- JVST – Cam Vaughn 31-yard pass from Tyler Huff (Garrison Rippa kick), 2:50. Gamecocks 28–14. Drive: 4 plays, 75 yards, 2:09.
- LT – Tru Edwards 3-yard pass from Evan Bullock (Buck Buchanan kick), 0:23. Gamecocks 28–21. Drive: 8 plays, 75 yards, 2:27.

Third quarter

- LT – Jay Wilkerson 32-yard pass from Evan Bullock (Buck Buchanan kick), 4:58. Tied 28–28. Drive: 7 plays, 66 yards, 3:45.
- LT – Team safety, 3:37. Bulldogs 30–28.

Fourth quarter

- LT – Marquis Crosby 4-yard run (Buck Buchanan kick), 10:20. Bulldogs 37–28. Drive: 9 plays, 50 yards, 4:42.
- JVST – Garrison Rippa 40-yard field goal, 5:55. Bulldogs 37–31. Drive: 12 plays, 53 yards, 4:25.
- JVST – Cam Vaughn 49-yard pass from Tyler Huff (kick failed), 0:00. Tied 37–37. Drive: 6 plays, 80 yards, 0:39.

Overtime

- JVST – Tre Stewart 11-yard run (Garrison Rippa kick). Gamecocks 44–37. Drive: 3 plays, 25 yards.

Statistics	JVST	LT
First downs	28	19
Total yards	424	410
Rushing yards	224	144
Passing yards	200	266
Passing: Comp–Att–Int	14–31–1	16–22–1
Time of possession	30:01	29:59

Team	Category	Player	Statistics
Jacksonville State	Passing	Tyler Huff	14/31, 200 yards, 2 TD, INT
Jacksonville State	Rushing	Tre Stewart	34 carries, 166 yards, 2 TD
Jacksonville State	Receiving	Cam Vaughn	7 receptions, 130 yards, 2 TD
Louisiana Tech	Passing	Evan Bullock	16/22, 266 yards, 3 TD, INT
Louisiana Tech	Rushing	Omiri Wiggins	16 carries, 67 yards
Louisiana Tech	Receiving	Tru Edwards	6 receptions, 142 yards, 2 TD

=== vs FIU ===
Game Ten – FIU Panthers (3–6) at Jacksonville State Gamecocks (6–3) – Game summary

Quarter	1	2	3	4	Total
Panthers	3	14	7	7	31
Gamecocks	3	17	0	14	34

at AmFirst Stadium • Jacksonville, AL

- Date: Saturday November 16, 2024
- Game time: 1:00 p.m.
- Game weather: Sunny • Temperature: 65 °F (18 °C) • Wind: NW 2 miles per hour (3.2 km/h)
- Game attendance: 17,688
- Referee: Reed Brotherton
- TV announcers (ESPN+): Eli Gold (play-by-play) and Bill Clark (analyst)

Game information

First quarter

- (9:02) FIU – Alejandro Prado 36-yard field goal (Drive: 13 plays, 57 yards, 5:58; FIU 3–0)
- (4:20) JVST – Garrison Rippa 31-yard field goal (Drive: 12 plays, 62 yards, 4:42; Tied 3–3)

Second quarter

- (14:54) FIU – Devonte Lyons 11-yard run, Alejandro Prado kick (Drive: 9 plays, 75 yards, 4:26; FIU 10–3)
- (11:16) JVST – Tyler Huff 10-yard run, Garrison Rippa kick (Drive: 9 plays, 75 yards, 3:38; Tied 10–10)
- (4:44) JVST – Tre Stewart 3-yard run, Garrison Rippa kick (Drive: 7 plays, 68 yards, 3:27; Jacksonville State 17–10)
- (1:45) FIU – Shomari Lawrence 3-yard run, Alejandro Prado kick (Drive: 7 plays, 75 yards, 2:59; Tied 17–17)
- (0:00) JVST – Garrison Rippa 42-yard field goal (Drive: 11 plays, 51 yards, 1:47; Jacksonville State 20–17)

Third quarter

- (7:37) FIU – Eric Rivers 5-yard pass from Keyone Jenkins, Alejandro Prado kick (Drive: 13 plays, 74 yards, 6:20; FIU 24–20)

Fourth quarter

- (14:22) JVST – Sean Brown 56-yard pass from Tyler Huff, Garrison Rippa kick (Drive: 2 plays, 60 yards, 0:31; Jacksonville State 27–24)
- (12:25) FIU – Antonio Ferguson 39-yard pass from Keyone Jenkins, Alejandro Prado kick (Drive: 4 plays, 75 yards, 1:57; FIU 31–27)
- (9:55) JVST – Tre Stewart 56-yard run, Garrison Rippa kick (Drive: 8 plays, 76 yards, 2:23; Jacksonville State 34–31)

Statistics	FIU	JVST
First downs	25	22
Total yards	431	445
Rushing yards	173	234
Passing yards	258	211
Passing: Comp–Att–Int	21–34–0	15–29–0
Time of possession	31:32	28:28

Team	Category	Player	Statistics
FIU	Passing	Keyone Jenkins	21/34, 258 yards, 2 TD
FIU	Rushing	Devonte Lyons	12 carries, 88 yards, TD
FIU	Receiving	Dean Patterson	9 receptions, 116 yards
Jacksonville State	Passing	Tyler Huff	15/28, 211 yards, TD
Jacksonville State	Rushing	Tre Stewart	22 carries, 136 yards, 2 TD
Jacksonville State	Receiving	Sean Brown	1 reception, 56 yards, TD

=== vs Sam Houston ===
Game Eleven – Sam Houston Bearkats (8–2) at Jacksonville State Gamecocks (7–3) – Game summary

Quarter	1	2	3	4	Total
Bearkats	0	3	8	0	11
Gamecocks	7	7	0	7	21

at AmFirst Stadium • Jacksonville, AL

- Date: Saturday November 23, 2024
- Game time: 11:00 a.m.
- Game weather: Sunny 51 °F (11 °C)
- Game attendance: 16,312
- Referee: Garrett Dickerson
- TV announcers (CBSSN): Jordan Kent (play-by-play) and Logan Ryan (analyst)

Game information

First quarter

- JSU – Tyler Huff 3-yard run (Garrison Rippa kick), 9:45. Gamecocks 7–0. Drive: 14 plays, 75 yards, 5:15.

Second quarter

- SHSU – Christian Pavon 34-yard field goal, 9:12. Gamecocks 7–3. Drive: 9 plays, 41 yards, 4:53.
- JSU – Tyler Huff 38-yard run (Garrison Rippa kick), 5:14. Gamecocks 14–3. Drive: 10 plays, 75 yards, 3:58.

Third quarter

- SHSU – Hunter Watson 21-yard run (Hunter Watson run for two-point conversation), 8:16. Gamecocks 14–11. Drive: 12 plays, 78 yards, 6:37.

Fourth quarter

- JSU – Tyler Huff 7-yard run (Garrison Rippa kick), 11:31. Gamecocks 21–11. Drive: 14 plays, 80 yards, 6:07.

Statistics	SHSU	JVST
First downs	16	20
Total yards	259	332
Rushing yards	175	278
Passing yards	84	54
Passing: Comp–Att–Int	13–26–0	9–12–0
Time of possession	31:05	28:55

Team	Category	Player	Statistics
Sam Houston	Passing	Hunter Watson	13/25, 84 yards
Sam Houston	Rushing	Hunter Watson	21 carries, 105 yards, TD
Sam Houston	Receiving	Noah Smith	6 receptions, 65 yards
Jacksonville State	Passing	Tyler Huff	9/12, 54 yards
Jacksonville State	Rushing	Tyler Huff	30 carries, 177 yards, 3 TD
Jacksonville State	Receiving	Sean Brown	1 reception, 22 yards

=== at Western Kentucky ===
Game Twelve – Jacksonville State Gamecocks (8–3) at Western Kentucky Hilltoppers (7–4) – Game summary

Quarter	1	2	3	4	Total
Gamecocks	3	7	0	7	17
Hilltoppers	7	3	3	6	19

at Houchens Industries–L. T. Smith Stadium • Bowling Green, KY

- Date: Saturday November 30, 2024
- Game time: 2:00 p.m.
- Game weather: Overcast, 40 °F (4 °C)
- Game attendance: 6,547
- Referee: Reed Brotherton
- TV announcers (ESPNU): Matt Schumacker (play-by-play) and Dustin Fox (analyst)

Game information

First quarter

- WKU – Elijah Young 21-yard pass from Caden Veltkamp (Lucas Carneiro kick), 8:48. Hilltoppers 7–0. Drive: 7 plays, 76 yards, 2:40.
- JVST – Garrison Rippa 46-yard field goal, 3:19. Hilltoppers 7–3. Drive: 5 plays, 53 yards, 2:09.

Second quarter

- JVST – Tre Stewart 8-yard run (Garrison Rippa kick), 3:42. Gamecocks 10-7. Drive: 6 plays, 47 yards, 1:21.
- WKU – Lucas Carneiro 50-yard field goal, 0:41. Tied 10-10. Drive: 9 plays, 53 yards, 2:56.

Third quarter

- WKU – Lucas Carneiro 21-yard field goal, 7:31. Hilltoppers 13-10. Drive: 15 plays, 79 yards, 6:07.

Fourth quarter

- WKU – Lucas Carneiro 35-yard field goal, 11:37. Hilltoppers 16-10. Drive: 13 plays, 72 yards, 5:36.
- JVST – Logan Smothers 17-yard run (Garrison Rippa kick), 9:44. Gamecocks 17-16. Drive: 5 plays, 75 yards, 1:53.

Statistics	JVST	WKU
First downs	13	23
Total yards	328	426
Rushing yards	229	105
Passing yards	99	321
Passing: Comp–Att–Int	7–17–1	29–49–0
Time of possession	23:33	36:27

Team	Category	Player	Statistics
Jacksonville State	Passing	Logan Smothers	4/6, 62 yards
Jacksonville State	Rushing	Tyler Huff	13 carries, 97 yards
Jacksonville State	Receiving	Michael Pettway	1 reception, 47 yards
Western Kentucky	Passing	Caden Veltkamp	28/47, 301 yards, TD
Western Kentucky	Rushing	Elijah Young	19 carries, 91 yards
Western Kentucky	Receiving	Easton Messer	5 receptions, 84 yards

=== Western Kentucky (C-USA Championship) ===
Game Thirteen – Western Kentucky Hilltoppers (8–4) at Jacksonville State Gamecocks (8–4) – Game summary

Quarter	1	2	3	4	Total
Hilltoppers	3	3	6	0	12
Gamecocks	14	14	10	14	52

at AmFirst Stadium • Jacksonville, AL

- Date: Friday December 6, 2024
- Game time: 6:00 p.m.
- Game weather: Temperature: 33 °F (1 °C) • Wind: Calm • Weather: Fair
- Game attendance: 15,628
- Referee: Rory Bernard
- TV announcers (CBSSN): Rich Waltz (play-by-play), Robert Turbin (analyst), and Amanda Guerra (sideline reporter)

Game information

First quarter

- WKU – Lucas Carneiro 54-yard field goal, 10:39. Hilltoppers 3-0. Drive: 8 plays, 35 yards, 4:15.
- JVST – Sean Brown 6-yard pass from Tyler Huff (Garrison Rippa kick), 7:39. Gamecocks 7-3. Drive: 6 plays, 75 yards, 3:00.
- JVST – Cam Vaughn 26-yard pass from Tyler Huff (Garrison Rippa kick), 3:21. Gamecocks 14-3. Drive: 6 plays, 42 yards, 1:52.

Second quarter

- JVST – Tre Stewart 4-yard run (Garrison Rippa kick), 3:47. Gamecocks 21-3. Drive: 10 plays, 85 yards, 4:14.
- JVST – Tre Stewart 6-yard run (Garrison Rippa kick), 1:19. Gamecocks 28-3. Drive: 4 plays, 57 yards, 0:51.
- WKU – Lucas Carneiro 44-yard field goal, 0:00. Gamecocks 28-6. Drive: 7 plays, 49 yards, 1:19.

Third quarter

- JVST – Tyler Huff 3-yard run (Garrison Rippa kick), 10:12. Gamecocks 35-6. Drive: 11 plays, 75 yards, 4:48.
- JVST – Garrison Rippa 27-yard field goal, 6:21. Gamecocks 38-6. Drive: 6 plays, 61 yards, 3:07.
- WKU – Kisean Johnson 25-yard pass from Caden Veltkamp (Two-point pass conversion failed), 2:16. Gamecocks 38-12. Drive: 8 plays, 75 yards, 4:05.

Fourth quarter

- JVST – Tre Stewart 29-yard run (Garrison Rippa kick), 11:01. Gamecocks 45-12. Drive: 10 plays, 75 yards, 6:15.
- JVST – Logan Smothers 10-yard run (Garrison Rippa kick), 3:00. Gamecocks 52-12. Drive: 10 plays, 61 yards, 6:41.

Statistics	WKU	JVST
First downs	17	26
Total yards	229	562
Rushing yards	88	386
Passing yards	141	176
Passing: Comp–Att–Int	18–30–0	11–15–0
Time of possession	24:42	35:18

Team	Category	Player	Statistics
Western Kentucky	Passing	Caden Veltkamp	18/30, 141 yards, TD
Western Kentucky	Rushing	Elijah Young	19 carries, 108 yards
Western Kentucky	Receiving	Easton Messer	7 receptions, 83 yards
Jacksonville State	Passing	Tyler Huff	11/15, 176 yards, 2 TD
Jacksonville State	Rushing	Tre Stewart	27 carries, 201 yards, 3 TD
Jacksonville State	Receiving	Cam Vaughn	4 receptions, 91 yards, TD

=== Ohio (Cure Bowl) ===
2024 Cure Bowl
Ohio Bobcats (10-3, 7-1) at Jacksonville State Gamecocks (9-4, 7-1)

Quarter	1	2	3	4	Total
Bobcats	14	13	0	3	30
Gamecocks	7	0	7	13	27

at Camping World Stadium, Orlando, Florida

- Date: December 20th, 2024
- Game time: 11:00 a.m. CST
- Game weather: Sunny • Temperature: 67 °F (19 °C) • Wind:N 7 mph (11 km/h)
- Game attendance: 10,518
- Referee: Edwin Lee
- TV announcers (ESPN): Brian Custer (play-by-play), Rod Gilmore (analyst), and Lauren Sisler (sideline)

Game information

First quarter

- (5:09) OHIO – Parker Navarro 17-yard rush (Gianni Spetic kick), Drive: 7 plays, 79 yards, 3:37; OHIO 7–0
- (1:22) OHIO – Parker Navarro 8-yard rush (Gianni Spetic kick), Drive: 6 plays, 64 yards, 2:56; OHIO 14–0
- (1:12) JVSU – Cam Vaughn 75-yard pass from Tyler Huff (Garrison Rippa kick), Drive: 1 play, 75 yards, 0:10; OHIO 14–7

Second quarter

- (4:59) OHIO – Parker Navarro 7-yard rush (kick failed), Drive: 11 plays, 67 yards, 6:12; OHIO 20–7
- (0:41) OHIO – Anthony Tyus III 11-yard pass from Parker Navarro (Gianni Spetic kick), Drive: 8 plays, 80 yards, 1:16; OHIO 27–7

Third quarter

- (9:36) JVSU – Tyler Huff 7-yard rush (Garrison Rippa kick), Drive: 3 plays, 20 yards, 0:43; OHIO 27–14

Fourth quarter

- (13:19) OHIO – Gianni Spetic 38-yard field goal, Drive: 12 plays, 66 yards, 7:32; OHIO 30–14
- (9:52) JVSU – Tre Stewart 3-yard rush (run failed), Drive: 11 plays, 75 yards, 3:27; OHIO 30–20
- (3:35) JVSU – Tre Stewart 1-yard rush (Garrison Rippa kick), Drive: 10 plays, 70 yards, 3:03; OHIO 30–27

Win Probability

Line

- Ohio –5.5

Over/Under

- 56.5

Statistics	OHIO	JVST
First downs	29	18
Total yards	488	406
Rushing yards	234	42
Passing yards	254	364
Passing: Comp–Att–Int	19–28–1	21–35–1
Time of possession	36:28	23:32

Team	Category	Player	Statistics
Ohio	Passing	Parker Navarro	19/28, 254 yards, 1 TD, 1 INT
Ohio	Rushing	Parker Navarro	14 carries, 111 yards, 1 TD
Ohio	Receiving	Coleman Owen	11 receptions, 140 yards
Jacksonville State	Passing	Tyler Huff	21/35, 364 yards, 1 TD, 1 INT
Jacksonville State	Rushing	Tre Stewart	15 carries, 35 yards, 2 TD
Jacksonville State	Receiving	Cam Vaughn	10 receptions, 184 yards, 1 TD
