= 2024 Liberty Flames football team =

American college football season

2024 Liberty Flames football

Bahamas Bowl, L 7–26 vs. Buffalo
- Conference: Conference USA
- Record: 8–4 (5–3 C-USA)
- Head coach: Jamey Chadwell (2nd season)
- Co-offensive coordinators: Willy Korn (2nd season); Newland Isaac (2nd season)
- Offensive scheme: Up-tempo spread
- Co-defensive coordinators: Kyle Krantz (2nd season); Skylor Magee (2nd season)
- Base defense: Multiple 4–2–5
- Home stadium: Williams Stadium

2024 Conference USA football standings
	Conf.			Overall
Team	W		L	W		L
Jacksonville State y$	7	–	1	9	–	5
Western Kentucky y	6	–	2	8	–	6
Sam Houston	6	–	2	10	–	3
Liberty	5	–	3	8	–	4
Louisiana Tech	4	–	4	5	–	8
UTEP	3	–	5	3	–	9
FIU	3	–	5	4	–	8
New Mexico State	2	–	6	3	–	9
Middle Tennessee	2	–	6	3	–	9
Kennesaw State*	2	–	6	2	–	10
Championship: Jacksonville State 52, Western Kentucky 12
$ – Conference champion; y – Championship game participant; * – Ineligible for postseason play due to FCS-to-FBS transition rules

The 2024 Liberty Flames football team represented Liberty University during the 2024 NCAA Division I FBS football season. The Flames played their home games at Williams Stadium located in Lynchburg, Virginia, and competed as a second-year member of Conference USA. They were led by second-year head coach Jamey Chadwell.

== Preseason ==
=== C-USA media poll ===
The Conference USA preseason media poll was released on July 19. The Flames were predicted to finish first in the conference.

== Schedule ==
The September 28 game against Appalachian State was canceled due to Hurricane Helene.

Date	Time	Opponent	Site	TV	Result	Attendance
August 31	6:00 p.m.	Campbell*	Williams Stadium; Lynchburg, VA	ESPN+	W 41–24	21,573
September 7	10:15 p.m.	at New Mexico State	Aggie Memorial Stadium; Las Cruces, NM	ESPN2	W 30–24	16,562
September 14	6:00 p.m.	UTEP^{†}	Williams Stadium; Lynchburg, VA	ESPN+	W 28–10	21,805
September 21	6:00 p.m.	East Carolina*	Williams Stadium; Lynchburg, VA	ESPN+	W 35–24	24,076
September 28	3:30 p.m.	at Appalachian State*	Kidd Brewer Stadium; Boone, NC	ESPN+	Canceled	
October 8	7:00 p.m.	FIU	Williams Stadium; Lynchburg, VA	CBSSN	W 31–24 ^{OT}	16,343
October 23	7:00 p.m.	at Kennesaw State	Fifth Third Bank Stadium; Kennesaw, GA	CBSSN	L 24–27	8,209
October 30	7:00 p.m.	Jacksonville State	Williams Stadium; Lynchburg, VA	CBSSN	L 21–31	18,069
November 9	1:00 p.m.	at Middle Tennessee	Johnny "Red" Floyd Stadium; Murfreesboro, TN	CBSSN	W 37–17	13,500
November 16	12:00 p.m.	at Massachusetts*	Warren McGuirk Alumni Stadium; Hadley, MA	ESPN+	W 35–34 ^{OT}	9,115
November 23	1:00 p.m.	Western Kentucky	Williams Stadium; Lynchburg, VA	ESPN+	W 38–21	17,930
November 29	3:30 p.m.	at Sam Houston	Bowers Stadium; Huntsville, TX	CBSSN	L 18–20	8,651
January 4, 2025	11:00 a.m.	vs. Buffalo	Thomas Robinson Stadium; Nassau, Bahamas (Bahamas Bowl)	ESPN2	L 7–26	4,610
*Non-conference game; ^{†}Homecoming; All times are in Eastern time

== Game summaries ==
=== Campbell (FCS) ===
Game One – Campbell Fighting Camels (FCS) (0–0) at Liberty Flames (0–0) – Game summary

Quarter	1	2	3	4	Total
Camels (FCS)	3	7	7	7	24
Flames	7	10	10	14	41

at Williams Stadium • Lynchburg, Virginia

- Date: August 31, 2024
- Game time: 6:00 p.m.
- Game weather: Cloudy • Temperature: 81 °F (27 °C) • Wind: S 8 miles per hour (13 km/h)
- Game attendance: 21,573
- Referee: Douglas Mercer
- TV announcers (ESPN+): Matt Warner (play-by-play), Joe Jauch (analyst) and Emily Austen (sideline)

Game information

First quarter

- (11:22) LIB – Quinton Cooley 6-yard run, Colin Karhu kick (Drive: 4 plays, 16 yards, 1:28; Liberty 7–0)
- (8:54) CAMP – Connor Lytton 27-yard field goal (Drive: 6 plays, 65 yards, 2:28; Liberty 7–3)

Second quarter

- (11:33) CAMP – Sincere Brown 36-yard pass from Chad Mascoe, Connor Lytton kick (Drive: 4 plays, 52 yards, 1:37; Campbell 10–7)
- (4:14) LIB – Colin Karhu 25-yard field goal (Drive: 14 plays, 79 yards, 7:10; Tied 10–10)
- (1:04) LIB – Treon Sibley 70-yard pass from Kaidon Salter, Colin Karhu kick (Drive: 3 plays, 82 yards, 0:29; Liberty 17–10)

Third quarter

- (8:54) LIB – Bentley Hanshaw 2-yard pass from Kaidon Salter, Colin Karhu kick (Drive: 11 plays, 58 yards, 6:00; Liberty 24–10)
- (4:37) LIB – Colin Karhu 34-yard field goal (Drive: 5 plays, 49 yards, 1:58; Liberty 27–10)
- (3:04) CAMP – Mark Biggins 1-yard run, Connor Lytton kick (Drive: 3 plays, 88 yards, 1:32; Liberty 27–17)

Fourth quarter

- (8:22) LIB – Billy Lucas 5-yard run, Colin Karhu kick (Drive: 14 plays, 92 yards, 6:23; Liberty 34–17)
- (4:10) LIB – Ryan Burger 6-yard run, Colin Karhu kick (Drive: 7 plays, 63 yards, 3:00; Liberty 41–17)
- (1:56) CAMP – Allen Mitchell 2-yard run, Connor Lytton kick (Drive: 6 plays, 65 yards, 2:14; Liberty 41–24)

Statistics	CAMP	LIB
First downs	13	28
Total yards	310	533
Rushing yards	116	279
Passing yards	194	254
Passing: Comp–Att–Int	11–18–0	18–26–0
Time of possession	23:58	36:02

Team	Category	Player	Statistics
Campbell	Passing	Chad Mascoe	10/17, 180 yards, TD
Campbell	Rushing	Mark Biggins	8 carries, 81 yards, TD
Campbell	Receiving	Sincere Brown	5 receptions, 126 yards, TD
Liberty	Passing	Kaidon Salter	16/23, 242 yards, 2 TD
Liberty	Rushing	Quinton Cooley	16 carries, 110 yards, TD
Liberty	Receiving	Treon Sibley	5 receptions, 109 yards, TD

=== at New Mexico State ===
Game Two – Liberty Flames (1–0) at New Mexico State Aggies (1–0) – Game summary

Quarter	1	2	3	4	Total
Flames	3	6	0	21	30
Aggies	10	7	0	7	24

at Aggie Memorial Stadium • Las Cruces, New Mexico

- Date: September 7, 2024
- Game time: 10:15 p.m.
- Game weather: Sunny
- Game attendance: 16,562
- Referee: Rodney Burnette
- TV announcers (ESPN2): Brian Custer (play-by-play), Rod Gilmore (analyst) and Lauren Sisler (sideline)

Game information

First quarter

- (7:23) NMSU – Abraham Montano 29 yard field goal (Drive: 9 plays, 47 yards, 4:16; NMSU 3–0)
- (5:39) NMSU – Monte Watkins 64 yard pass from Parker Awad, Abraham Montano kick (Drive: 1 plays, 64 yards, 0:12; NMSU 10–0)
- (2:53) LIB – Colin Karhu 39 yard field goal (Drive: 12 plays, 74 yards, 7:21; NMSU 10–3)

Second quarter

- (13:15) NMSU – Seth McGowan 5 yard pass from Parker Awad, Abraham Montano kick (Drive: 10 plays, 75 yards, 4:38; NMSU 17–3)
- (5:55) LIB – Colin Karhu 31 yard field goal (Drive: 8 plays, 73 yards, 3:31; NMSU 17–6)
- (0:37) LIB – Colin Karhu 29 yard field goal (Drive: 12 plays, 41 yards, 2:56; NMSU 17–9)

Third quarter
Fourth quarter

- (9:45) LIB – CJ Bazile Jr. 22 Yd fumble return, Kaidon Salter run for two-point conversion (Drive: 6 plays, 4 yards, 3:22; NMSU 17–15)
- (7:42) NMSU – Parker Awad 2 yard run, Abraham Montano kick (Drive: 4 plays, 65 yards, 1:55; NMSU 24–15)
- (5:12) LIB – Quinton Cooley 27 yard run, Colin Karhu kick (Drive: 6 plays, 82 yards, 2:26; NMSU 24–22)
- (1:05) LIB – Quinton Cooley 44 yard run, Kaidon Salter pass to Reese Smith for two-point conversion (Drive: 7 plays, 90 yards, 1:54; LIB 30–24)

Statistics	LIB	NMSU
First downs	18	18
Total yards	473	275
Rushing yards	217	117
Passing yards	256	158
Passing: Comp–Att–Int	16–29–0	9–22–0
Time of possession	28:56	31:04

Team	Category	Player	Statistics
Liberty	Passing	Kaidon Salter	16/29, 256 yards
Liberty	Rushing	Quinton Cooley	12 carries, 111 yards, 2 TD
Liberty	Receiving	Treon Sibley	5 receptions, 155 yards
New Mexico State	Passing	Parker Awad	9/22, 158 yards, 2 TD
New Mexico State	Rushing	Seth McGowan	15 carries, 66 yards
New Mexico State	Receiving	Monte Watkins	1 reception, 64 yards, TD

=== UTEP ===
Game Three – UTEP Miners (0–2) at Liberty Flames (2–0) – Game summary

Quarter	1	2	3	4	Total
Miners	3	0	7	0	10
Flames	7	7	7	7	28

at Williams Stadium • Lynchburg, Virginia

- Date: September 14, 2024
- Game time: 6:00 p.m.
- Game weather: Sunny • Temperature: 78 °F (26 °C) • Wind: NE 7 miles per hour (11 km/h)
- Game attendance: 21,805
- Referee: Garrett Dickerson
- TV announcers (ESPN+): Matt Warner (play-by-play), Joe Jauch (analyst) and Emily Austen (sideline)

Game information

First quarter

- (9:40) UTEP – Buzz Flabiano 25-yard field goal (Drive: 8 plays, 37 yards, 3:26; UTEP 3–0)
- (4:34) LIB – Billy Lucas 12-yard run, Colin Karhu kick (Drive: 10 plays, 84 yards, 5:00; Liberty 7–3)

Second quarter

- (14:35) LIB – Billy Lucas 1-yard run, Colin Karhu kick (Drive: 2 plays, 24 yards, 0:13; Liberty 14–3)

Third quarter

- (12:26) UTEP – Kenny Odom 60-yard pass from Skyler Locklear, Buzz Flabiano kick (Drive: 4 plays, 71 yards, 1:11; Liberty 14–10)
- (2:07) LIB – Billy Lucas 2-yard run, Colin Karhu kick (Drive: 7 plays, 81 yards, 3:11; Liberty 21–10)

Fourth quarter

- (6:51) LIB – Tyson Mobley 13-yard pass from Kaidon Salter, Colin Karhu kick (Drive: 7 plays, 87 yards, 3:47; Liberty 28–10)

Statistics	UTEP	LIB
First downs	18	19
Total yards	335	415
Rushing yards	91	187
Passing yards	244	228
Passing: Comp–Att–Int	26–43–2	15–19–0
Time of possession	29:14	30:46

Team	Category	Player	Statistics
UTEP	Passing	Skyler Locklear	26/43, 244 yards, TD, 2 INT
UTEP	Rushing	Jevon Jackson	15 carries, 67 yards
UTEP	Receiving	Kam Thomas	8 receptions, 68 yards
Liberty	Passing	Kaidon Salter	15/19, 228 yards, TD
Liberty	Rushing	Billy Lucas	21 carries, 104 yards, 3 TD
Liberty	Receiving	Treon Sibley	4 receptions, 77 yards

=== East Carolina ===
Game Four – East Carolina Pirates (2–1) at Liberty Flames (3–0) – Game summary

Quarter	1	2	3	4	Total
Pirates	14	3	7	0	24
Flames	0	7	14	14	35

at Williams Stadium • Lynchburg, Virginia

- Date: September 21, 2024
- Game time: 6:00 p.m. EDT
- Game weather: Temperature: 80 °F (27 °C) • Wind: SW at 6 miles per hour (9.7 km/h) • Weather: Rain
- Game attendance: 24,076
- Referee: Ron Hudson
- TV announcers (ESPN+): Matt Warner (play-by-play), Joe Jauch (analyst) and Emily Austen (sideline)

Game information

First quarter

- (9:52) ECU – Jake Garcia 6 yard run, Andrew Conrad kick (Drive: 10 plays, 68 yards, 3:35; East Carolina 7–0)
- (3:18) ECU – Marlon Gunn Jr. 1 yard run, Andrew Conrad kick (Drive: 1 play, 1 yard, 0:05; East Carolina 14–0)

Second quarter

- (11:52) ECU – Andrew Conrad 35 yard field goal (Drive: 10 plays, 23 yards, 4:31; East Carolina 17–0)
- (2:53) LIB – Elijah Canion 14 yard pass from Kaidon Salter, Colin Karhu kick (Drive: 12 plays, 80 yards, 6:32; East Carolina 17–7)

Third quarter

- (9:16) LIB – Reese Smith 17 yard pass from Kaidon Salter, Colin Karhu kick (Drive: 11 plays, 75 yards, 5:44; East Carolina 17–14)
- (2:52) LIB – Reese Smith 14 yard pass from Kaidon Salter, Colin Karhu kick (Drive: 9 plays, 69 yards, 4:27; Liberty 21–17)
- (0:41) ECU – Rahjai Harris 44 yard run, Andrew Conrad kick (Drive: 7 plays, 52 yards, 2:03; East Carolina 24–21)

Fourth quarter

- (8:10) LIB – Reese Smith 15 yard pass from Kaidon Salter, Colin Karhu kick (Drive: 16 plays, 75 yards, 7:31; Liberty 28–24)
- (2:00) LIB – Quinton Cooley 21 yard run, Colin Karhu kick (Drive: 10 plays, 77 yards, 4:05; Liberty 35–24)

Statistics	ECU	LIB
First downs	21	26
Total yards	331	414
Rushing yards	127	191
Passing yards	204	223
Passing: Comp–Att–Int	20–36–1	19–32–1
Time of possession	23:17	36:43

Team	Category	Player	Statistics
East Carolina	Passing	Jake Garcia	20/36, 204 yards, 1 INT
East Carolina	Rushing	Rahjai Harris	13 carries, 47 yards, 1 TD
East Carolina	Receiving	Chase Sowell	5 receptions, 72 yards
Liberty	Passing	Kaidon Salter	19/32, 223 yards, 4 TD, 1 INT
Liberty	Rushing	Quinton Cooley	19 carries, 105 yards, 1 TD
Liberty	Receiving	Reese Smith	6 receptions, 80 yards, 3 TD

=== at Appalachian State ===
Game Five – Liberty Flames (4–0) at Appalachian State Mountaineers (2–2)

Quarter	1	2	3	4	Total
Flames	-	-	-	-	0
Mountaineers	-	-	-	-	0

at Kidd Brewer Stadium, Boone, North Carolina

- Date: September 28, 2024
- Game time: Canceled, due to Hurricane Helene

=== FIU ===
Game Six – FIU Panthers (2–3) at Liberty Flames (4–0) – Game summary

Quarter	1	2	3	4	OT	Total
Panthers	3	7	0	14	0	24
Flames	3	14	0	7	7	31

at Williams Stadium • Lynchburg, Virginia

- Date: October 8, 2024
- Game time: 7:00 p.m.
- Game weather: Sunny • Temperature: 61 °F (16 °C) • Wind: SE at 3 miles per hour (4.8 km/h)
- Game attendance: 16,343
- Referee: Garrett Dickerson
- TV announcers (CBSSN): Jordan Kent (play-by-play) and Donte Whitner (analyst)

Game information

First quarter

- (8:34) LIB – Colin Karhu 28-yard field goal (Drive: 7 plays, 66 yards, 3:43; Liberty 3–0)
- (4:16) FIU – Alejandro Prado 31-yard field goal (Drive: 10 plays, 48 yards, 4:10; Tied 3–3)

Second quarter

- (14:50) FIU – Dean Patterson 17-yard run, Alejandro Prado kick (Drive: 5 plays, 56 yards, 2:02; FIU 10–3)
- (8:15) LIB – Quinton Cooley 4-yard run, Colin Karhu kick (Drive: 11 plays, 59 yards, 6:27; Tied 10–10)
- (0:20) LIB – Kaidon Salter 20-yard run, Colin Karhu kick (Drive: 10 plays, 73 yards, 2:26; Liberty 17–10)

Third quarter

No scoring plays

Fourth quarter

- (10:43) LIB – Quinton Cooley 9-yard run, Colin Karhu kick (Drive: 8 plays, 82 yards, 4:12; Liberty 24–10)
- (6:23) FIU – Kejon Owens 3-yard run, Alejandro Prado kick (Drive: 9 plays, 66 yards, 4:13; Liberty 24–17)
- (1:42) FIU – Keyone Jenkins 1-yard run, Alejandro Prado kick (Drive: 9 plays, 61 yards, 3:44; Tied 24–24)

Overtime

- (0:00) LIB – Kaidon Salter 9-yard run, Colin Karhu kick (Drive: 4 plays, 25 yards, 15:00; Liberty 31–24)

Statistics	FIU	LIB
First downs	18	21
Total yards	344	406
Rushing yards	99	281
Passing yards	245	125
Passing: Comp–Att–Int	19–29–0	9–16–1
Time of possession	29:18	30:42

Team	Category	Player	Statistics
FIU	Passing	Keyone Jenkins	19/29, 245 yards, INT
FIU	Rushing	Kejon Owens	15 carries, 52 yards, TD
FIU	Receiving	Dean Patterson	6 receptions, 90 yards
Liberty	Passing	Kaidon Salter	9/16, 125 yards
Liberty	Rushing	Quinton Cooley	29 carries, 174 yards, 2 TD
Liberty	Receiving	Reese Smith	4 receptions, 68 yards

=== at Kennesaw State ===
Game Seven – Liberty Flames (5–0) at Kennesaw State Owls (0–6) – Game summary

Quarter	1	2	3	4	Total
Flames	7	7	3	7	24
Owls	7	7	7	6	27

at Fifth Third Stadium • Kennesaw, Georgia

- Date: October 23, 2024
- Game time: 7:00 p.m.
- Game weather: Sunny • Temperature: 69 °F (21 °C) • Wind: SE 6 miles per hour (9.7 km/h)
- Game attendance: 8,209
- Referee: Reed Brotherton
- TV announcers (CBSSN): Jason Knapp (play-by-play) and Brock Vereen (analyst)

Game information

First quarter

- (5:43) LIB – Treon Sibley 15 yard pass from Kaidon Salter, Colin Karhu kick (Drive: 11 plays, 73 yards, 5:22; LIB 7–0)
- (2:49) KENN – Christian Moss 41 yard pass from Davis Bryson, Austin Welch kick (Drive: 6 plays, 75 yards, 2:54; TIE 7–7)

Second quarter

- (10:21) KENN – Michael Benefield 1 yard run, Austin Welch kick (Drive: 4 plays, 60 yards, 2:04; KENN 14–7)
- (0:48) LIB – Donte Lee Jr. 15 yard pass from Kaidon Salter, Colin Karhu kick (Drive: 12 plays, 81 yards, 2:12; TIE 14–14)

Third quarter

- (8:02) KENN – Qua Ashley 6 yard run, Austin Welch kick (Drive: 9 plays, 60 yards, 5:31; KENN 21–14)
- (5:05) LIB – Colin Karhu 47 yard field goal (Drive: 8 plays, 46 yards, 2:57; KENN 21–17)

Fourth quarter

- (11:43) KENN – Austin Welch 31 yard field goal (Drive: 14 plays, 62 yards, 0:00; KENN 24–17)
- (4:13) KENN – Austin Welch 41 yard field goal (Drive: 7 plays, 42 yards, 0:00; KENN 27–17)
- (1:49) LIB – Elijah Canion 0 yard pass from Kaidon Salter, Colin Karhu kick (Drive: 10 plays, 63 yards, 2:18; KENN 27–24)

Statistics	LIB	KENN
First downs	22	18
Total yards	386	323
Rushing yards	180	134
Passing yards	206	189
Passing: Comp–Att–Int	22–40–1	16–20–0
Time of possession	27:41	32:19

Team	Category	Player	Statistics
Liberty	Passing	Kaidon Salter	22/40, 206 yards, 3 TD, 1 INT
Liberty	Rushing	Kaidon Salter	9 carries, 87 yards
Liberty	Receiving	Elijah Canion	5 receptions, 61 yards, 1 TD
Kennesaw State	Passing	Davis Bryson	16/20, 189 yards, 1 TD
Kennesaw State	Rushing	Michael Benefield	16 carries, 54 yards, 1 TD
Kennesaw State	Receiving	Jaden Robinson	3 receptions, 72 yards

=== Jacksonville State ===
Game Eight – Jacksonville State Gamecocks (4–3) at Liberty Flames (5–1) – Game summary

Quarter	1	2	3	4	Total
Gamecocks	7	7	10	7	31
Flames	7	7	0	7	21

at Williams Stadium • Lynchburg, Virginia

- Date: October 30, 2024
- Game time: 7:00 p.m.
- Game weather: Sunny • Temperature: 66 °F (19 °C) • Wind: SW 5 miles per hour (8.0 km/h)
- Game attendance: 18,069
- Referee: Rodney Burnette
- TV announcers (CBSSN): Carter Blackburn (play-by-play) and Luke Kuechly (analyst)

Game information

First quarter

- (10:43) LIB – Vaughn Blue 25-yard run, Colin Karhu kick (Drive: 5 plays, 62 yards, 2:32; Liberty 7–0)
- (10:30) JVST – Tre Stewart 75-yard run, Garrison Rippa kick (Drive: 1 play, 75 yards, 0:13; Tied 7–7)

Second quarter

- (10:53) JVST – Tre Stewart 28-yard run, Garrison Rippa kick (Drive: 5 plays, 75 yards, 1:39; Jacksonville State 14–7)
- (4:16) LIB – Quinton Cooley 2-yard run, Colin Karhu kick (Drive: 12 plays, 75 yards, 6:37; Tied 14–14)

Third quarter

- (9:22) JVST – Garrison Rippa 25-yard field goal (Drive: 10 plays, 71 yards, 4:20; Jacksonville State 17–14)
- (2:35) JVST – Tre Stewart 1-yard run, Garrison Rippa kick (Drive: 11 plays, 87 yards, 4:20; Jacksonville State 24–14)

Fourth quarter

- (12:29) LIB – Jacob Jenkins 4-yard pass from Kaidon Salter, Colin Karhu kick (Drive: 13 plays, 78 yards, 5:05; Jacksonville State 24–21)
- (1:57) JVST – Tre Stewart 1-yard run, Garrison Rippa kick (Drive: 2 plays, 1 yard, 0:37; Jacksonville State 31–21)

Statistics	JVST	LIB
First downs	21	27
Total yards	458	420
Rushing yards	363	273
Passing yards	95	147
Passing: Comp–Att–Int	6–10–0	12–25–1
Time of possession	23:46	36:14

Team	Category	Player	Statistics
Jacksonville State	Passing	Tyler Huff	6/10, 95 yards
Jacksonville State	Rushing	Tre Stewart	27 carries, 232 yards, 4 TD
Jacksonville State	Receiving	Cam Vaughn	1 reception, 39 yards
Liberty	Passing	Kaidon Salter	12/25, 147 yards, TD, INT
Liberty	Rushing	Quinton Cooley	27 carries, 133 yards, TD
Liberty	Receiving	Elijah Canion	5 receptions, 63 yards

=== at Middle Tennessee ===
Game Nine – Liberty Flames (5–2) at Middle Tennessee Blue Raiders (3–6) – Game summary

Quarter	1	2	3	4	Total
Flames	7	20	3	7	37
Blue Raiders	7	0	0	10	17

at Johnny "Red" Floyd Stadium • Murfreesboro, Tennessee

- Date: Saturday November 9, 2024
- Game time: 1:00 p.m.
- TV announcers: Matt Warner (play-by-play), Joe Jauch (analyst) and Emily Austen (sideline)

Game information

First Quarter

- (9:16) MTSU – Hayes Sutton 6 yard pass from Nicholas Vattiato (Zeke Rankin kick) (Drive: 3 plays, 42 yards, 0:56; Middle Tennessee 7–0)
- (5:53) LIB – Kaidon Salter 41 yard run (Colin Karhu kick) (Drive: 7 plays, 93 yards, 3:14; Tied 7–7)

Second Quarter

- (9:00) LIB – Quinton Cooley 4 yard run (Colin Karhu kick) (Drive: 14 plays, 85 yards, 6:07; Liberty 14–7)
- (3:09) LIB – Julian Gray 41 yard run (PAT failed) (Drive: 7 plays, 96 yards, 3:31; Liberty 20–7)
- (0:32) LIB – Jacob Jenkins 4 yard pass from Kaidon Salter (Colin Karhu) (Drive: 5 plays, 23 yards, 1:18; Liberty 27–7)

Third Quarter

- (1:49) LIB – Colin Karhu 35 yard field goal (Drive: 8 plays, 79 yards, 3:16; Liberty 30–7)

Fourth Quarter

- (12:53) MTSU – Terry Wilkins 17 yard pass from Nicholas Vattiato (Zeke Rankin kick) (Drive: 8 plays, 75 yards, 3:56; Liberty 30–14)
- (9:42) LIB – Julian Gray 34 yard pass from Kaidon Salter (Colin Karhu kick) (Drive: 6 plays, 79 yards, 3:05; Liberty 37–14)
- (4:47) MTSU – Zeke Rankin 48 yard field goal (Drive: 10 plays, 44 yards, 4:55; Liberty 37–17)

Statistics	LIB	MTSU
First downs	30	19
Total yards	500	351
Rushing yards	339	88
Passing yards	161	263
Turnovers	2	1
Time of possession	30:23	29:37

Team	Category	Player	Statistics
Liberty	Passing	Kaidon Salter	11/15, 154 yards, 2 TD
Liberty	Rushing	Quinton Cooley	24 carries, 136 yards, TD
Liberty	Receiving	Elijah Canion	3 receptions, 54 yards
Middle Tennessee	Passing	Nicholas Vattiato	22/33, 263 yards, 2 TD
Middle Tennessee	Rushing	Jaiden Credle	10 carries, 27 yards
Middle Tennessee	Receiving	Holden Willis	5 receptions, 81 yards

=== at UMass ===
Game Ten – Liberty Flames (6–2) at UMass Minutemen (2–7) – Game summary

Quarter	1	2	3	4	OT	Total
Flames	0	7	7	14	7	35
Minutemen	7	13	0	8	6	34

at Warren McGuirk Alumni Stadium • Hadley, Massachusetts

- Date: Saturday November 16, 2024
- Game time: 12:00 p.m.
- Game weather: Sunny • Temperature: 56 °F (13 °C) • Wind: NW 11 miles per hour (18 km/h)
- Game attendance: 9,115
- Referee: Gary Patterson
- TV announcers (ESPN+): Jay Burnham (play-by-play) and Andy Gresh (analyst)

Game information

First quarter

- (9:20) UMASS – Jalen John 9-yard run, Jacob Lurie kick (Drive: 10 plays, 77 yards, 5:35; UMass 7–0)
- (7:20) UMASS – Jacob Lurie 22-yard field goal (Drive: 13 plays, 86 yards, 6:50; UMass 10–0)

Second quarter

- (5:01) LIB – Quinton Cooley 11-yard run, Colin Karhu kick (Drive: 6 plays, 82 yards, 2:11; UMass 10–7)
- (1:33) UMASS – Jacob Lurie 43-yard field goal (Drive: 9 plays, 51 yards, 3:28; UMass 13–7)
- (0:10) UMASS – AJ Hairston 2-yard run, Jacob Lurie kick (Drive: 6 plays, 45 yards, 0:58; UMass 20–7)

Third quarter

- (10:01) LIB – Kaidon Salter 8-yard run, Colin Karhu kick (Drive: 11 plays, 82 yards, 4:51; UMass 20–14)

Fourth quarter

- (13:09) LIB – Quinton Cooley 11-yard run, Colin Karhu kick (Drive: 12 plays, 89 yards, 5:40; Liberty 21–20)
- (7:08) UMASS – Ahmad Haston 2-yard run, Dominick Mazotti pass (Drive: 11 plays, 75 yards, 6:01; UMass 28–21)
- (3:49) LIB – Kaidon Salter 1-yard run, Colin Karhu kick (Drive: 8 plays, 65 yards, 3:19; Tied 28–28)

Overtime

- (0:00) UMASS – Jalen John 2-yard run (Drive: 2 plays, 25 yards, 0:00; UMass 34–28)
- (0:00) LIB – Quinton Cooley 11-yard run, Colin Karhu kick (Drive: 3 plays, 25 yards, 0:00; Liberty 35–34)

Statistics	LIB	MASS
First downs	27	26
Total yards	423	426
Rushing yards	309	263
Passing yards	114	163
Passing: Comp–Att–Int	9–16–1	13–25–0
Time of possession	27:50	32:10

Team	Category	Player	Statistics
Liberty	Passing	Kaidon Salter	9/16, 114 yards, INT
Liberty	Rushing	Quinton Cooley	20 carries, 147 yards, 3 TD
Liberty	Receiving	Treon Sibley	1 reception, 34 yards
UMass	Passing	AJ Hairston	13/25, 163 yards
UMass	Rushing	Jalen John	15 carries, 119 yards, 2 TD
UMass	Receiving	Jakobie Keeney-James	6 receptions, 75 yards

=== Western Kentucky ===
Game Eleven – Western Kentucky Hilltoppers (7–3) at Liberty Flames (7–2) – Game summary

Quarter	1	2	3	4	Total
Hilltoppers	0	7	14	0	21
Flames	0	21	7	10	38

at Williams Stadium • Lynchburg, Virginia

- Date: Saturday, November 23, 2024
- Game time: 1:00 p.m.
- Game weather: Sunny • Temperature: 55 °F (13 °C) • Wind: NW 12 miles per hour (19 km/h)
- Game attendance: 17,930
- Referee: Ron Hudson
- TV announcers (ESPN+): Matt Warner (play-by-play), Joe Jauch (analyst) and Emily Austen (sideline)

Game information

First quarter

No scoring plays

Second quarter

- (13:17) WKU – Dalvin Smith 9-yard pass from Caden Veltkamp, Lucas Carneiro kick (Drive: 6 plays, 64 yards, 2:37; Western Kentucky 7–0)
- (9:30) LIB – Billy Lucas 2-yard run, Colin Karhu kick (Drive: 8 plays, 92 yards, 3:44; Tied 7–7)
- (2:05) LIB – Quinton Cooley 22-yard run, Colin Karhu kick (Drive: 8 plays, 67 yards, 3:49; Liberty 14–7)
- (0:10) LIB – Julian Gray 11-yard pass from Kaidon Salter, Colin Karhu kick (Drive: 7 plays, 90 yards, 0:45; Liberty 21–7)

Third quarter

- (10:33) WKU – George Hart III 2-yard run, Lucas Carneiro kick (Drive: 9 plays, 75 yards, 4:27; Liberty 21–14)
- (9:44) LIB – Quinton Cooley 2-yard run, Colin Karhu kick (Drive: 2 plays, 38 yards, 0:39; Liberty 28–14)
- (3:44) WKU – Kisean Johnson 16-yard pass from Caden Veltkamp, Lucas Carneiro kick (Drive: 13 plays, 75 yards, 6:00; Liberty 28–21)

Fourth quarter

- (11:27) LIB – Colin Karhu 29-yard field goal (Drive: 14 plays, 61 yards, 7:24; Liberty 31–21)
- (2:59) LIB – Kaidon Salter 3-yard run, Colin Karhu kick (Drive: 13 plays, 86 yards, 6:35; Liberty 38–21)

Statistics	WKU	LIB
First downs	19	29
Total yards	368	556
Rushing yards	106	419
Passing yards	262	137
Passing: Comp–Att–Int	20–34–3	7–12–0
Time of possession	25:17	34:43

Team	Category	Player	Statistics
Western Kentucky	Passing	Caden Veltkamp	20/34, 262 yards, 2 TD, 3 INT
Western Kentucky	Rushing	Elijah Young	9 carries, 60 yards
Western Kentucky	Receiving	Kisean Johnson	7 receptions, 94 yards, TD
Liberty	Passing	Kaidon Salter	6/11, 108 yards, TD
Liberty	Rushing	Quinton Cooley	24 carries, 166 yards, 2 TD
Liberty	Receiving	Julian Gray	2 receptions, 47 yards, TD

=== at Sam Houston ===
Game Twelve – Liberty Flames (8–2) at Sam Houston Bearkats (8–3) – Game summary

Quarter	1	2	3	4	Total
Flames	2	7	0	9	18
Bearkats	3	14	3	0	20

at Bowers Stadium • Huntsville, Texas

- Date: Friday November 29, 2024
- Game time: 3:30 p.m.
- TV: CBSSN

Game information

First quarter

- (10:39) SHSU – Christian Pavon 39-yard field goal (Drive: 10 plays, 53 yards, 4:30; Sam Houston 3–0)
- (2:34) LIB – Team safety (Drive: 2 plays, -1 yard, 0:41; Sam Houston 3–2)

Second quarter

- (10:14) SHSU – Simeon Evans 17-yard pass from Hunter Watson, Christian Pavon kick (Drive: 13 plays, 87 yards, 4:50; Sam Houston 10–2)
- (6:45) SHSU – Simeon Evans 2-yard pass from Hunter Watson, Christian Pavon kick (Drive: 5 plays, 31 yards, 2:29; Sam Houston 17–2)
- (1:14) LIB – Elijah Canion 10-yard pass from Kaidon Salter, Colin Karhu kick (Drive: 7 plays, 51 yards, 2:10; Sam Houston 17–9)

Third quarter

- (5:13) SHSU – Christian Pavon 38-yard field goal (Drive: 8 plays, 36 yards, 4:39; Sam Houston 20–9)

Fourth quarter

- (7:20) LIB – Colin Karhu 43-yard field goal (Drive: 11 plays, 48 yards, 2:40; Sam Houston 20–12)
- (1:10) LIB – Kaidon Salter 33-yard run, 2-point pass conversion failed (Drive: 6 plays, 64 yards, 1:06; Sam Houston 20–18)

Statistics	LIB	SHSU
First downs	18	18
Total yards	262	333
Rushing yards	179	131
Passing yards	83	202
Passing: Comp–Att–Int	12-37-2	19–34–1
Time of possession	24:42	35:18

Team	Category	Player	Statistics
Liberty	Passing	Kaidon Salter	12/35, 83 yards, TD, 2 INT
Liberty	Rushing	Quinton Cooley	19 carries, 90 yards
Liberty	Receiving	Reese Smith	3 receptions, 26 yards
Sam Houston	Passing	Hunter Watson	19/33, 202 yards, 2 TD, INT
Sam Houston	Rushing	Jay Ducker	24 carries, 96 yards
Sam Houston	Receiving	Simeon Evans	6 receptions, 83 yards, 2 TD

=== vs. Buffalo (Bahamas Bowl) ===
2025 Bahamas Bowl
Buffalo Bulls (8–4) vs. Liberty Flames (8–3) – Game summary

Quarter	1	2	3	4	Total
Bulls	6	3	7	10	26
Flames	0	0	0	7	7

at Thomas Robinson Stadium, Nassau, Bahamas

- Date: Saturday, January 4, 2025
- Game time: 11:00 a.m.
- Game weather: Partly cloudy • Temperature: 72 °F (22 °C) • Wind: NNE at 15 miles per hour (24 km/h)
- Game attendance: 4,610
- Referee: Darryl DeBerry
- TV announcers (ESPN2): Matt Schumacker (play-by-play), Dustin Fox (analyst) and Coley Harvey (sideline)
- Box score

Game information

First Quarter

- (10:30) BUFF – Upton Bellenfant 52 yard field goal (Drive: 7 plays, 29 yards, 3:00; Buffalo 3–0)
- (5:37) BUFF – Upton Bellenfant 43 yard field goal (Drive: 7 plays, 42 yards, 3:24; Buffalo 6–0)

Second Quarter

- (14:56) BUFF – Upton Bellenfant 20 yard field goal (Drive: 8 plays, 55 yards, 1:46; Buffalo 9–0)

Third Quarter

- (12:01) BUFF – Al-Jay Henderson 45 yard run, Upton Bellenfant kick (Drive: 9 plays, 75 yards, 2:59; Buffalo 16–0)

Fourth Quarter

- (12:28) BUFF – Upton Bellenfant 45 yard field goal (Drive: 4 plays, 7 yards, 1:26; Buffalo 19–0)
- (12:09) BUFF – Red Murdock 31 yard interception return, Upton Bellenfant kick (Drive: 2 plays, 0 yards, 0:19; Buffalo 26–0)
- (7:00) LIB – Reese Smith 36 yard pass from Nate Hampton, Colin Karhu kick (Drive: 14 plays, 75 yards, 5:09; Buffalo 26–7)

Statistics	UB	LIB
First downs	18	11
Total yards	359	242
Rushing yards	222	162
Passing yards	137	80
Passing: Comp–Att–Int	9–19–0	6–21–1
Time of possession	37:01	22:59

Team	Category	Player	Statistics
Buffalo	Passing	C.J. Ogbonna	9/19, 137 yards
Buffalo	Rushing	Al-Jay Henderson	21 carries, 199 yards, TD
Buffalo	Receiving	Victor Snow	4 receptions, 41 yards
Liberty	Passing	Nate Hampton	2/9, 40 yards, TD, INT
Liberty	Rushing	Billy Lucas	3 carries, 57 yards
Liberty	Receiving	Reese Smith	1 reception, 36 yards, TD
