= 2024 Cure Bowl =

Postseason college football bowl game

2024 StaffDNA Cure Bowl
- 10th Cure Bowl
| Ohio Bobcats | Jacksonville State Gamecocks |
| (10–3) | (9–4) |
| MAC | CUSA |
| 30 | 27 |
| Head coach: Brian Smith | Head coach: Rod Smith (interim) |
| | 1 | 2 | 3 | 4 | Total |
|---|---|---|---|---|---|
| Ohio | 14 | 13 | 0 | 3 | 30 |
| Jacksonville State | 7 | 0 | 7 | 13 | 27 |
- Date: December 20, 2024
- Season: 2024
- Stadium: Camping World Stadium
- Location: Orlando, Florida
- MVP: Parker Navarro (QB, Ohio)
- Favorite: Ohio by 6.5
- Referee: Edwin Lee (AAC)
- Attendance: 10,518

United States TV coverage
- Network: ESPN
- Announcers: Brian Custer (play-by-play), Rod Gilmore (analyst), and Lauren Sisler (sideline)

The 2024 Cure Bowl was a college football bowl game played on December 20, 2024, at Camping World Stadium located in Orlando, Florida. The tenth annual Cure Bowl, the game featured Ohio and Jacksonville State. The game began at approximately 12:00 noon. EST and aired on ESPN. The Cure Bowl was one of the 2024–25 bowl games concluding the 2024 FBS football season. The bowl was sponsored by the health care employment website StaffDNA and officially known as the StaffDNA Cure Bowl. Ohio held on after a 20 point a halftime lead to win 30–27. The win gave Brian Smith his first ever win, Ohio its first ever 11 win season, and extended Ohio's bowl winning streak to six games.

== Teams ==
Based on conference tie-ins, the game was expected to feature teams from the Group of Five conferences. The teams were announced on December 7 as Ohio from the Mid-American Conference (MAC) and Jacksonville State from Conference USA (C-USA), both teams having won their respective conference title games. This was the first time that the Bobcats and Gamecocks ever played each other.

=== Ohio Bobcats ===
Ohio entered the bowl with a 10–3 overall record (7–1 in conference). The Bobcats had three regular-season losses, to Syracuse, Kentucky, and Miami (OH). The team qualified for the MAC Championship Game, a rematch with Miami (OH), which the Bobcats won, 38–3. Ohio did not face any ranked teams during the season. This was the Bobcat's third consecutive season appearing in a bowl game. Ohio's new head coach for the bowl game was Brian Smith—he was named interim head coach after Tim Albin resigned to take another coaching position, then was subsequently named as the program's next head coach.

=== Jacksonville State Gamecocks ===
Jacksonville State entered the bowl with a 9–4 overall record (7–1 in conference). They began their regular season with three losses—to Coastal Carolina, Louisville, and Eastern Michigan—then won eight games in a row before ending their regular season with a loss to Western Kentucky. The Gamecocks then had a rematch with Western Kentucky in the Conference USA Championship Game, which Jacksonville State won, 52–12. Louisville was the only ranked team that the Gamecocks faced. This was Jacksonville State's second consecutive season appearing in a bowl game. The Gamecocks' interim head coach was Rod Smith, as Rich Rodriguez resigned to take another coaching position.

== Game summary ==
2024 StaffDNA Cure Bowl

| Quarter | 1 | 2 | 3 | 4 | Total |
|---|---|---|---|---|---|
| Ohio | 14 | 13 | 0 | 3 | 30 |
| Jacksonville State | 7 | 0 | 7 | 13 | 27 |

at Camping World Stadium • Orlando, Florida

- Date: Friday, December 20, 2024
- Game time: 12:05 p.m. EST
- Game weather: Sunny • Temperature: 67 °F (19 °C) • Wind: 7 mph (11 km/h) north
- Game attendance: 10,518
- Referee: Edwin Lee
- TV announcers (ESPN): Brian Custer (play-by-play), Rod Gilmore (analyst), and Lauren Sisler (sideline)
- Ohio notes, Jacksonville State notes, Box score

Game information

First quarter

- (5:09) OHIO – Parker Navarro 17 yard rush, Gianni Spetic kick (Drive: 7 plays, 79 yards, 3:37; Ohio 7–0)
- (1:22) OHIO – Parker Navarro 8 yard rush, Gianni Spetic kick (Drive: 6 plays, 64 yards, 2:56; Ohio 14–0)
- (1:12) JSU – Cam Vaughn 75 yard pass from Tyler Huff, Garrison Rippa kick (Drive: 1 play, 75 yards, 0:10; Ohio 14–7)

Second quarter

- (4:59) OHIO – Parker Navarro 7 yard rush, kick failed (Drive: 11 plays, 67 yards, 6:12; Ohio 20–7)
- (0:41) OHIO – Anthony Tyus III 11 yard pass from Parker Navarro, Gianni Spetic kick (Drive: 8 plays, 80 yards, 1:16; Ohio 27–7)

Third quarter

- (9:36) JSU – Tyler Huff 7 yard rush, Garrison Rippa kick (Drive: 3 plays, 20 yards, 0:43; Ohio 27–14)

Fourth quarter

- (13:19) OHIO – Gianni Spetic 38 yard field goal (Drive: 12 plays, 66 yards, 7:32; Ohio 30–14)
- (9:52) JSU – Tre Stewart 3 yard rush, Two-point conversion failed (Drive: 11 plays, 75 yards, 3:27; Ohio 30–20)
- (3:35) JSU – Tre Stewart 1 yard rush, Garrison Rippa kick (Drive: 10 plays, 70 yards, 3:03; Ohio 30–27)

=== Statistics ===
| Statistics | OHIO | JSU |
|---|---|---|
| First downs | 27 | 16 |
| Plays–yards | 73–487 | 66–363 |
| Rushes–yards | 45–227 | 33– -1 |
| Passing yards | 260 | 349 |
| Passing: comp–att–int | 19–29–1 | 20–32–1 |
| Turnovers | | |
| Time of possession | 37:20 | 22:40 |

| Team | Category | Player | Statistics |
|---|---|---|---|
| Ohio | Passing | Parker Navarro | 19/29, 255 yards, TD, INT |
| Ohio | Rushing | Parker Navarro | 14 carries, 110 yards, 3 TD |
| Ohio | Receiving | Coleman Owen | 11 receptions, 141 yards |
| Jacksonville State | Passing | Tyler Huff | 20/32, 349 yards, TD, INT |
| Jacksonville State | Rushing | Tre Stewart | 15 carries, 27 yards, 2 TD |
| Jacksonville State | Receiving | Cam Vaughn | 9 receptions, 169 yards, TD |

== See also ==
- 2024 Pop-Tarts Bowl, contested at the same venue eight days later
- 2024 Citrus Bowl (December), contested at the same venue 11 days later
