= 2024 Middle Tennessee Blue Raiders football team =

American college football season

2024 Middle Tennessee Blue Raiders football
- Conference: Conference USA
- Record: 3–9 (2–6 C-USA)
- Head coach: Derek Mason (1st season)
- Offensive coordinator: Bodie Reeder (1st season)
- Offensive scheme: Spread
- Defensive coordinator: Brian Stewart (1st season)
- Base defense: 3–4
- Home stadium: Johnny "Red" Floyd Stadium

2024 Conference USA football standings
	Conf.			Overall
Team	W		L	W		L
Jacksonville State y$	7	–	1	9	–	5
Western Kentucky y	6	–	2	8	–	6
Sam Houston	6	–	2	10	–	3
Liberty	5	–	3	8	–	4
Louisiana Tech	4	–	4	5	–	8
UTEP	3	–	5	3	–	9
FIU	3	–	5	4	–	8
New Mexico State	2	–	6	3	–	9
Middle Tennessee	2	–	6	3	–	9
Kennesaw State*	2	–	6	2	–	10
Championship: Jacksonville State 52, Western Kentucky 12
$ – Conference champion; y – Championship game participant; * – Ineligible for postseason play due to FCS-to-FBS transition rules

The 2024 Middle Tennessee Blue Raiders football team represented Middle Tennessee State University as a member of Conference USA (C-USA) during the 2024 NCAA Division I FBS football season. Led by first-year head coach Derek Mason, the Blue Raiders compiled an overall record of 3–9 with a mark of 2–6 in conference play, placing in a three-way tie for eighth at the bottom of the C-USA standings. The team played home games at Johnny "Red" Floyd Stadium, located in Murfreesboro, Tennessee.

== Schedule ==
Date	Time	Opponent	Site	TV	Result	Attendance
August 31	6:00 p.m.	Tennessee Tech*	Johnny "Red" Floyd Stadium; Murfreesboro, TN	ESPN+	W 32–25	16,000
September 7	3:15 p.m.	at No. 6 Ole Miss*	Vaught–Hemingway Stadium; Oxford, MS	SECN	L 3–52	66,427
September 14	6:00 p.m.	Western Kentucky	Johnny "Red" Floyd Stadium; Murfreesboro, TN (100 Miles of Hate)	ESPN+	L 21–49	12,227
September 21	3:00 p.m.	Duke*^{†}	Johnny "Red" Floyd Stadium; Murfreesboro, TN	ESPNU	L 17–45	15,209
September 28	6:30 p.m.	at Memphis*	Simmons Bank Liberty Stadium; Memphis, TN	ESPNU	L 7–24	25,266
October 10	7:00 p.m.	at Louisiana Tech	Joe Aillet Stadium; Ruston, LA	CBSSN	L 21–48	15,072
October 15	7:00 p.m.	Kennesaw State	Johnny "Red" Floyd Stadium; Murfreesboro, TN	CBSSN	W 14–5	10,200
October 23	6:30 p.m.	at Jacksonville State	AmFirst Stadium; Jacksonville, AL	ESPN2	L 20–42	17,988
November 2	2:30 p.m.	at UTEP	Sun Bowl; El Paso, TX	CBSSN	W 20–13	14,775
November 9	12:00 p.m.	Liberty	Johnny "Red" Floyd Stadium; Murfreesboro, TN	CBSSN	L 17–37	13,500
November 23	1:30 p.m.	New Mexico State	Johnny "Red" Floyd Stadium; Murfreesboro, TN	ESPN+	L 21–36	10,123
November 30	1:00 p.m.	at FIU	Pitbull Stadium; Miami, FL	ESPN+	L 24–35	14,686
*Non-conference game; ^{†}Homecoming; Rankings from AP Poll and CFP Rankings released prior to game; All times are in Central time

== Preseason ==
=== C-USA media poll ===
The Conference USA preseason media poll was released on July 19. The Blue Raiders were predicted to finish fourth in the conference.

== Game summaries ==
=== Tennessee Tech ===
	1	2	3	4	Total
Golden Eagles	0	5	6	14	25
Blue Raiders	7	14	0	11	32

Statistics	TNTC	MTSU
First downs	21	20
Total yards	341	328
Rushing yards	67	118
Passing yards	274	210
Turnovers	1	1
Time of possession	27:09	32:51

Team	Category	Player	Statistics
Tennessee Tech	Passing	Jordyn Potts	27/38, 256 yards, 3 TD
Tennessee Tech	Rushing	Jalen Mitchell	11 rushes, 52 yards
Tennessee Tech	Receiving	D. J. Linkins	7 receptions, 61 yards
Middle Tennessee	Passing	Nicholas Vattiao	20/35, 210 yards, TD, INT
Middle Tennessee	Rushing	Frank Peasant	10 rushes, 49 yards, 2 TD
Middle Tennessee	Receiving	Omari Kelly	4 receptions, 47 yards

=== At No. 6 Ole Miss ===
	1	2	3	4	Total
Blue Raiders	0	3	0	0	3
No. 6 Rebels	17	14	14	7	52

Statistics	MTSU	MISS
First downs	18	34
Total yards	278	655
Rushing yards	28	258
Passing yards	250	397
Turnovers	2	0
Time of possession	33:03	26:57

Team	Category	Player	Statistics
Middle Tennessee	Passing	Nicholas Vattiato	21/33, 209 yards, INT
Middle Tennessee	Rushing	Terry Wilkins	7 rushes, 19 yards
Middle Tennessee	Receiving	Holden Willis	6 receptions, 93 yards
Ole Miss	Passing	Jaxson Dart	25/27, 377 yards, TD
Ole Miss	Rushing	Henry Parrish Jr.	14 rushes, 165 yards, 4 TD
Ole Miss	Receiving	Tre Harris	9 receptions, 130 yards

=== Western Kentucky (100 Miles of Hate) ===
	1	2	3	4	Total
Hilltoppers	14	7	21	7	49
Blue Raiders	0	0	14	7	21

Statistics	WKU	MTSU
First downs	30	21
Total yards	631	514
Rushing yards	150	58
Passing yards	481	456
Turnovers	0	1
Time of possession	31:22	28:38

Team	Category	Player	Statistics
Western Kentucky	Passing	Caden Veltkamp	27/30, 398 yards, 5 TD
Western Kentucky	Rushing	L. T. Sanders	8 rushes, 54 yards
Western Kentucky	Receiving	Kisean Johnson	8 receptions, 129 yards, 2 TD
Middle Tennessee	Passing	Nicholas Vattiato	24/31, 456 yards, 3 TD, INT
Middle Tennessee	Rushing	Nicholas Vattiato	9 rushes, 21 yards
Middle Tennessee	Receiving	Omari Kelly	9 receptions, 239 yards, 3 TD

=== Duke ===
	1	2	3	4	Total
Blue Devils	28	7	3	7	45
Blue Raiders	10	0	7	0	17

Statistics	DUKE	MTSU
First downs	17	18
Total yards	340	295
Rushing yards	124	168
Passing yards	216	127
Turnovers	1	4
Time of possession	23:45	36:15

Team	Category	Player	Statistics
Duke	Passing	Maalik Murphy	14/21, 216 yards, 3 TD, INT
Duke	Rushing	Star Thomas	17 carries, 111 yards, 2 TD
Duke	Receiving	Nicky Dalmolin	4 receptions, 100 yards, 2 TD
Middle Tennessee	Passing	Nicholas Vattiato	21/33, 127 yards, TD, INT
Middle Tennessee	Rushing	Jaiden Credle	12 carries, 125 yards, TD
Middle Tennessee	Receiving	Holden Willis	3 receptions, 60 yards, TD

=== At Memphis ===
	1	2	3	4	Total
Blue Raiders	0	0	7	0	7
Tigers	0	14	10	0	24

Statistics	MTSU	MEM
First downs	13	22
Total yards	312	413
Rushing yards	29	186
Passing yards	283	227
Turnovers	2	1
Time of possession	25:51	34:09

Team	Category	Player	Statistics
Middle Tennessee	Passing	Nicholas Vattiato	21/31, 283 yards
Middle Tennessee	Rushing	Jaiden Credle	10 carries, 39 yards
Middle Tennessee	Receiving	Omari Kelly	6 receptions, 174 yards
Memphis	Passing	Seth Henigan	26/41, 227 yards
Memphis	Rushing	Mario Anderson Jr.	18 carries, 118 yards, TD
Memphis	Receiving	Roc Taylor	6 receptions, 69 yards

=== At Louisiana Tech ===
	1	2	3	4	Total
Blue Raiders	14	0	7	0	21
Bulldogs	20	14	14	0	48

Statistics	MTSU	LT
First downs	17	27
Total yards	336	551
Rushing yards	60	222
Passing yards	276	329
Turnovers	2	1
Time of possession	25:37	34:23

Team	Category	Player	Statistics
Middle Tennessee	Passing	Nicholas Vattiato	24/39, 276 yards, 2 TD, INT
Middle Tennessee	Rushing	Jekail Middlebrook	5 carries, 30 yards
Middle Tennessee	Receiving	Omari Kelly	8 receptions, 103 yards
Louisiana Tech	Passing	Evan Bullock	18/25, 290 yards, 5 TD
Louisiana Tech	Rushing	Omiri Wiggins	8 carries, 49 yards
Louisiana Tech	Receiving	Tru Edwards	6 receptions, 127 yards, TD

=== Kennesaw State ===
	1	2	3	4	Total
Owls	2	0	0	3	5
Blue Raiders	7	0	7	0	14

Statistics	KENN	MTSU
First downs	10	17
Total yards	234	284
Rushing yards	131	85
Passing yards	103	199
Turnovers	2	0
Time of possession	29:48	30:12

Team	Category	Player	Statistics
Kennesaw State	Passing	Khalib Johnson	5/17, 52 yards, 2 INT
Kennesaw State	Rushing	Qua Ashley	11 carries, 79 yards
Kennesaw State	Receiving	Carson Kent	4 receptions, 59 yards
Middle Tennessee	Passing	Nicholas Vattiato	19/34, 199 yards
Middle Tennessee	Rushing	Jaiden Credle	10 carries, 49 yards
Middle Tennessee	Receiving	Holden Willis	8 receptions, 92 yards

=== At Jacksonville State ===
	1	2	3	4	Total
Blue Raiders	10	0	3	7	20
Gamecocks	14	0	21	7	42

Statistics	MTSU	JVST
First downs	17	30
Total yards	364	575
Rushing yards	67	438
Passing yards	297	137
Turnovers	0	1
Time of possession	29:56	30:04

Team	Category	Player	Statistics
Middle Tennessee	Passing	Nicholas Vattiato	25/36, 297 yards, 2 TD
Middle Tennessee	Rushing	Jaiden Credle	8 carries, 39 yards
Middle Tennessee	Receiving	Omari Kelly	8 receptions, 128 yards
Jacksonville State	Passing	Tyler Huff	10/18, 137 yards, TD
Jacksonville State	Rushing	Tre Stewart	21 carries, 210 yards, TD
Jacksonville State	Receiving	Cam Vaughn	4 receptions, 82 yards

=== At UTEP ===
	1	2	3	4	Total
Blue Raiders	3	7	3	7	20
Miners	3	7	3	0	13

Statistics	MTSU	UTEP
First downs	17	20
Total yards	333	305
Rushing yards	94	160
Passing yards	239	145
Turnovers	3	1
Time of possession	31:26	28:34

Team	Category	Player	Statistics
Middle Tennessee	Passing	Nicholas Vattiato	21/35, 239 yards, TD, 2 INT
Middle Tennessee	Rushing	Jaiden Credle	10 carries, 40 yards
Middle Tennessee	Receiving	Myles Butler	5 receptions, 101 yards, TD
UTEP	Passing	JP Pickles	18/33, 145 yards, INT
UTEP	Rushing	Jevon Jackson	21 carries, 83 yards
UTEP	Receiving	Jevon Jackson	5 receptions, 33 yards

=== Liberty ===
	1	2	3	4	Total
Flames	7	20	3	7	37
Blue Raiders	7	0	0	10	17

Statistics	LIB	MTSU
First downs	30	19
Total yards	500	351
Rushing yards	339	88
Passing yards	161	263
Turnovers	2	1
Time of possession	30:23	29:37

Team	Category	Player	Statistics
Liberty	Passing	Kaidon Salter	11/15, 154 yards, 2 TD
Liberty	Rushing	Quinton Cooley	24 carries, 136 yards, TD
Liberty	Receiving	Elijah Canion	3 receptions, 54 yards
Middle Tennessee	Passing	Nicholas Vattiato	22/33, 263 yards, 2 TD
Middle Tennessee	Rushing	Jaiden Credle	10 carries, 27 yards
Middle Tennessee	Receiving	Holden Willis	5 receptions, 81 yards

=== New Mexico State ===
	1	2	3	4	Total
Aggies	10	3	13	10	36
Blue Raiders	0	7	7	7	21

Statistics	NMSU	MTSU
First downs	18	25
Total yards	382	447
Rushing yards	145	170
Passing yards	237	277
Turnovers	0	2
Time of possession	27:16	32:44

Team	Category	Player	Statistics
New Mexico State	Passing	Parker Awad	12/16, 221 yards
New Mexico State	Rushing	Seth McGowan	12 carries, 83 yards
New Mexico State	Receiving	Seth McGowan	6 receptions, 96 yards, TD
Middle Tennessee	Passing	Nicholas Vattiato	30/45, 277 yards, 2 TD, 2 INT
Middle Tennessee	Rushing	Jekail Middlebrook	10 carries, 80 yards
Middle Tennessee	Receiving	Holden Willis	3 receptions, 67 yards, TD

=== At FIU ===
	1	2	3	4	Total
Blue Raiders	0	17	0	7	24
Panthers	14	14	0	7	35

Statistics	MTSU	FIU
First downs	17	22
Total yards	377	463
Rushing yards	121	144
Passing yards	256	319
Turnovers	1	0
Time of possession	26:20	33:40

Team	Category	Player	Statistics
Middle Tennessee	Passing	Nicholas Vattiato	21/33, 256 yards, 2 TD, INT
Middle Tennessee	Rushing	Jekail Middlebrook	10 carries, 41 yards, TD
Middle Tennessee	Receiving	Holden Willis	6 receptions, 123 yards, 2 TD
FIU	Passing	Keyone Jenkins	19/27, 319 yards, 3 TD
FIU	Rushing	Devonte Lyons	15 carries, 101 yards, TD
FIU	Receiving	Eric Rivers	7 receptions, 117 yards, TD

== Personnel ==
=== Roster ===
2024 Middle Tennessee Blue Raiders Football
Quarterbacks: 10 – Luther Richesson – (redshirt) Sophomore (6'3, 217); 11 – Nicholas Vattiato – (redshirt) Junior (6'1, 205); 16 – Roman Gagliano – Freshman (6'3, 224); 18 – Stone Frost – Graduate Student (5'11, 215); Running backs: 0 – Brian Brewton – (redshirt) Senior (5'7, 173); 4 – Terry Wilkins – (redshirt) Senior (5'8, 186); 22 – Jaiden Credle – Junior (6'1, 195); 24 – Frank Peasant – (redshirt) Senior (5'11, 196); 26 – Jayce Gardener – (redshirt) Senior (5'11, 214); 31 – Austin Clemons – Freshman (6'0, 204); 32 – Jekail Middlebrook - (redshirt) Freshman (5'9, 191); Wide receivers: 1 – Omari Kelly – Junior (6'0, 180); 5 – Myles Butler – (redshirt) Junior (6'2, 198); 7 – Sam Driggers – (redshirt) Freshman (5'11, 201); 9 – Hayes Sutton – Graduate Student (6'1, 199); 13 – Javonte Sherman – (redshirt) Junior (6'2, 216); 15 – Josh Evans – Freshman (6'3, 215); 17 – Gamarion Carter – (redshirt) Junior (6'2, 189); 18 – Ethan Crite – (redshirt) Freshman (6'2, 188); 19 – Kellen Stewart – (redshirt) Junior (5'9, 164); 27 – Caleb Dochnahl – Junior (6'1, 201); 28 – Christopher Kaup – Freshman (6'2, 184); 81 – Mitchell Howell – (redshirt) Senior (5'10, 204); 84 – Tyson Resper – (redshirt) Sophomore (5'8, 167); 86 – Cam'ron Lacy – (redshirt) Freshman (5'8, 153); 87 – Elijah Ealey – (redshirt) Junior (5'11, 166); Tight ends: 41 – Slade Alexander – (redshirt) Junior (6'2, 222); 42 – Evan Poticher – Freshman (6'3, 237); 45 – Bobby Council – Freshman (5'11, 234); 46 – Sawyer Lovvorn – Freshman (6'1, 217); 80 – Ryan Hoerstkamp – Graduate Student (6'2, 240); 82 – Taharin Sudderth – (redshirt) Junior (6'2, 239); 83 – Holden Willis – (redshirt) Senior (6'4, 212); 85 – Brody Benke – Freshman (6'4, 249); 88 – Jacob Coleman – (redshirt) Junior (6'3, 230)	Offensive Lineman: 48 – Nash Stidham – (redshirt) Sophomore (5'10, 210); 55 – Mateo Guevara – (redshirt) Sophomore (6'4, 309); 60 – Ayden Merrihew – Junior (6'4, 280); 61 – Lantz Peoples – Freshman (6'5, 372); 62 – Simon Wilson – (redshirt) Junior (6'1, 317); 63 – Alex Gale – Freshman (6'3, 300); 65 – Julius Pierce – Graduate Student (6'4, 293); 68 – Jason Overton – Freshman (6'2, 285); 70 – Isaac Rue – (redshirt) Freshman (6'6, 307); 71 – Ellis Adams – Graduate Student (6'4, 372); 72 – Morgan Scott – (redshirt) Junior (6'5, 298); 73 – Marcus Miller – (redshirt) Junior (6'4, 299); 74 – Ethan Ellis – Graduate Student (6'6, 309); 75 – Dumela Knox – Junior (6'7, 310); 76 – Shamar Crawford – (redshirt) Sophomore (6'5, 287); 77 – Jaylen Robinson – (redshirt) Sophomore (6'7, 270); 78 – Daniel Gonzalez – (redshirt) Senior (6'5, 289); 79 – Zach Clayton – Freshman (6'5, 296); Defensive Line: 34 – Kedrick Burley – Freshman (6'2, 241) (DE/OLB); 35 – Zeion Simpson-Smith – Freshman (6'1, 235); 40 – Anthony Bynum – (redshirt) Freshman (6'3, 257); 44 – Andy Nwaoko – (redshirt) Senior (6'3, 251); 45 – Ja'Darious Morris – (redshirt) Freshman (6'1, 255); 46 – Reggie Johnson – Junior (6'4, 220); 47 – Tiyyan Robinson – Freshman (6'5, 232); 49 – James Stewart – (redshirt) Junior (6'3, 247); 89 – Brandon Buckner – (redshirt) Junior (6'0, 248); 90 – Chayce Smith – (redshirt) Freshman (6'2, 250); 91 – Felix Hixon – (redshirt) Sophomore (6'3, 302); 92 – Damonte Smith – (redshirt) Junior (6'3, 298); 93 – Aidan Butts – Freshman (6'3, 252); 96 – James Gillespie – Junior (6'3, 295); 98 – Shakai Woods – (redshirt) Freshman (6'1, 292); 99 – Alex Williams – Graduate Student (6'7, 291)	Linebackers: 8 – Devyn Curtis – (redshirt) Senior (6'2, 235); 9 – Parker Hughes – (redshirt) Junior (6'2, 212); 10 – Drew Francis – (redshirt) Senior (6'3, 228); 12 – Jalen Davis – Graduate Student (5'11, 200); 30 – Caleb Reid – Freshman (6'3, 236); 33 – Malik Love – Freshman (6'4, 207); 36 – Jordan Thompson – (redshirt) Freshman (5'11, 214); 43 – Markel James – (redshirt) Freshman (6'2, 227); 50 – Elijah Carney – (redshirt) Freshman (6'0, 222); 51 – Amarrien Bailey – Freshman (6'0, 212); 52 – Muaaz Byard – (redshirt) Sophomore (6'1, 223); 54 – Nolan Forsha – Junior (6'2, 211); 56 – Jayson Lowe – Sophomore (6'2, 220); 57 – Brady Russell – (redshirt) Freshman (6'0, 220); 58 – Korey Smith – Freshman (6'0, 220); 59 – Jacob Jackson – (redshirt) Senior (5'11, 206); Defensive backs: 2 – De'Arre McDonald – (redshirt) Senior (6'0, 205); 4 – James Monds III – (redshirt) Sophomore (5'11, 185); 6 – Marvae Myers – Graduate Student (6'0, 196); 7 – Brendon Harris – Graduate Student (6'1, 210); 18 – Xavier Williams – Graduate Student (6'2, 205); 21 – Abdul Muhammad – Junior (6'2, 175); 22 – Chris Johnson – (redshirt) Junior (5'10, 188); 24 – Trevon Ferrell – (redshirt) Sophomore (5'10, 178); 25 – Jackson Lowe – Freshman (6'1, 188); 26 – Jared Douglas – Junior (6'1, 181); 27 – Rickey Smith – (redshirt) Junior (6'0, 177); 28 – Da'Shawn Elder – (redshirt) Junior (6'0, 215); 29 – Tyrell Raby – (redshirt) Junior (5'11, 183); 31 – John Howse IV – (redshirt) Junior (6'1, 198); 32 – Alan Young – (redshirt) Freshman (6'0, 209); 33 – Taylor Ratinaud – Freshman (6'0, 190); 39 – Jordan Beasley – Freshman (6'1, 195); Kicker/Punter: 7 – Zeke Rankin – (redshirt) Senior (5'8, 215) (K); 35 – Zach Benedict – (redshirt) Sophomore (6'1, 195) (K); 36 – Wyatt Joyce – Freshman (5'10, 166) (K); 96 – Jacob Taylor – Freshman (5'10, 190) (P); 97 – Grant Chadwick – Freshman (6'4, 190) (P); 99 – Trey Turk – Senior (6'1, 212) (P); Long snappers: 54 – Connor Dougherty – (redshirt) Sophomore (6'3, 253); 67 – Henry Hamlin – Freshman (6'3, 230); 69 – Brody Butler – (redshirt) Senior (6'0, 229); Legend: (C) Team captain; (S) Suspended; (I) Ineligible; Injured; Redshirt
Source and player details, 2024 Middle Tennessee Blue Raiders Football Commits (01/14/2025):
