= Mark Smith (R/C modeling pioneer) =

Mark Smith with "Jonathan Livingston Seagull"

Mark Smith (born c. 1950) was a pioneer in radio-controlled (R/C) model aviation. The son of Rod Smith, an early inventor of R/C equipment, Mark began building hand-launch gliders in the 6th or 7th grade. In his teens he followed his father's footsteps into R/C gliders. He later went on to designing R/C gliders like his 100-inch-wingspan Windfree along with the 72-inch-wingspan Wanderer which were the best-sellers for decades. In the early 1970s he built radio-controlled seagulls for the 1972 movie Jonathan Livingston Seagull.

In 1973, he set a new long-distance flying world record. His radio-controlled glider stayed in the air for thirteen hours, travelling for a total of 286 miles in 2286 laps around two pylons set 100m apart.

Smith was from Escondido, California.
