= 2024 Conference USA Football Championship Game =

Western Kentucky Hilltoppers	Jacksonville State Gamecocks
(8–4)	(8–4)
12	52
Head coach: Tyson Helton	Head coach: Rich Rodriguez
	1	2	3	4	Total
Western Kentucky	3	3	6	0	12
Jacksonville State	14	14	10	14	52
- Date: December 6, 2024
- Season: 2024
- Stadium: AmFirst Stadium
- Location: Jacksonville, Alabama
- MVP: Tyler Huff (QB, Jacksonville State)
- Favorite: Jacksonville State by 4.5
- Referee: Rory Bernard
- Attendance: 15,628

United States TV coverage
- Network: CBSSN
- Announcers: Rich Waltz, Robert Turbin and Amanda Guerra

2024 Conference USA football standings
	Conf.			Overall
Team	W		L	W		L
Jacksonville State y$	7	–	1	9	–	5
Western Kentucky y	6	–	2	8	–	6
Sam Houston	6	–	2	10	–	3
Liberty	5	–	3	8	–	4
Louisiana Tech	4	–	4	5	–	8
UTEP	3	–	5	3	–	9
FIU	3	–	5	4	–	8
New Mexico State	2	–	6	3	–	9
Middle Tennessee	2	–	6	3	–	9
Kennesaw State*	2	–	6	2	–	10
Championship: Jacksonville State 52, Western Kentucky 12
$ – Conference champion; y – Championship game participant; * – Ineligible for postseason play due to FCS-to-FBS transition rules

The 2024 Conference USA Football Championship Game was a college football game played on December 6, 2024 to determine the champion of Conference USA (CUSA) for the 2024 season. It was the 20th Conference USA Football Championship Game. The game started at 6:00 p.m. CST and aired on CBS Sports Network. The game featured the Western Kentucky Hilltoppers against the Jacksonville State Gamecocks.

== Teams ==
The 2024 Conference USA Championship Game featured the Western Kentucky Hilltoppers and the Jacksonville State Gamecocks. This was the fourth CUSA title game appearance for Western Kentucky and its first since 2021, tying Tulsa and UCF for the most CUSA Championship appearances by any team, and extending the Hilltoppers' record for most by a current CUSA member. This was the first CUSA title game appearance for Jacksonville State, which was in its second season as a CUSA member and first season of championship eligibility.

The site of the game was determined during the penultimate week of the conference season. Jacksonville State's win over Sam Houston on November 23, combined with Western Kentucky's loss to Liberty that day, gave Jacksonville State the outright regular-season title and hosting rights.

This was the eighth meeting between Western Kentucky and Jacksonville State; prior to the game, the Hilltoppers led the all-time series 5–2.

=== Western Kentucky Hilltoppers ===
Western Kentucky clinched a spot in the game following its win over Jacksonville State on November 30.

=== Jacksonville State Gamecocks ===
Jacksonville State clinched a spot in the game following its win over Sam Houston on November 23.

== Scoring summary ==
2024 Conference USA Football Championship Game
Western Kentucky Hilltoppers (8–4) vs. Jacksonville State Gamecocks (8–4)

Quarter	1	2	3	4	Total
Hilltoppers	3	3	6	0	12
Gamecocks	14	14	10	14	52

at Burgess–Snow Field at AmFirst Stadium • Jacksonville, Alabama

- Date: December 6, 2024
- Game time: 7:00 p.m. EST
- Game weather: Temperature: 33 °F (1 °C) • Wind: Calm • Weather: Fair
- Game attendance: 15,628
- Referee: Rory Bernard
- TV announcers (CBS Sports Network): Rich Waltz, Robert Turbin and Amanda Guerra

Game information

First Quarter

- (10:39) WKU – Lucas Carneiro 54 yard field goal (Drive: 8 plays, 35 yards, 4:15; Western Kentucky 3–0)
- (7:39) JVST – Sean Brown 6 yard pass from Tyler Huff, Garrison Rippa kick (Drive: 6 plays, 75 yards, 3:00; Jacksonville State 7–3)
- (3:21) JVST – Cam Vaughn 26 yard pass from Tyler Huff, Garrison Rippa kick (Drive: 6 plays, 42 yards, 1:52; Jacksonville State 14–3)

Second Quarter

- (3:47) JVST – Tre Stewart 4 yard rush, Garrison Rippa kick (Drive: 10 plays, 85 yards, 4:14; Jacksonville State 21–3)
- (1:19) JVST – Tre Stewart 6 yard rush, Garrison Rippa kick (Drive: 4 plays, 57 yards, 0:51; Jacksonville State 28–3)
- (0:00) WKU – Lucas Carneiro 44 yard field goal (Drive: 7 plays, 49 yards, 1:19; Jacksonville State 28–6)

Third Quarter

- (10:12) JVST – Tyler Huff 3 yard rush, Garrison Rippa kick (Drive: 11 plays, 75 yards, 4:48; Jacksonville State 35–6)
- (6:21) JVST – Garrison Rippa 27 yard field goal ('Drive: 6 plays, 61 yards, 3:07; Jacksonville State 38–6)
- (2:16) WKU – Kisean Johnson 25 yard pass from Caden Veltkamp, two-point pass attempt failed (Drive: 8 plays, 75 yards, 4:05; Jacksonville State 38–12)

Fourth Quarter

- (11:01) JVST – Tre Stewart 29 yard rush, Garrison Rippa kick ('Drive: 10 plays, 75 yards, 6:16; Jacksonville State 45–12)
- (3:00) JVST – Logan Smothers 10 yard rush, Garrison Rippa kick ('Drive: 10 plays, 61 yards, 6:41; Jacksonville State 52–12)

Statistics	WKU	JVST
First downs	17	26
Plays–yards	56–229	71–562
Rushes–yards	26–88	56–386
Passing yards	141	176
Passing: comp–att–int	18–30–0	11–15–0
Time of possession	24:42	35:18

Team	Category	Player	Statistics
Western Kentucky	Passing	Caden Veltkamp	18/30, 141 yards, TD
Western Kentucky	Rushing	Elijah Young	19 carries, 108 yards
Western Kentucky	Receiving	Easton Messer	7 receptions, 83 yards
Jacksonville State	Passing	Tyler Huff	11/15, 176 yards, 2 TD
Jacksonville State	Rushing	Tre Stewart	27 carries, 201 yards, 3 TD
Jacksonville State	Receiving	Cam Vaughn	4 receptions, 91 yards, TD
