= Rod Smith (Canadian football) =

Canadian football player (1925–2016)

Profile
- Position: Guard

Personal information
- Born: February 8, 1925; Guelph, Ontario, Canada
- Died: December 11, 2016 (aged 91); Waterloo, Ontario, Canada

Career information
- College: University of Toronto

Career history
- 1947: Toronto Balmy Beach Beachers
- 1949: Montreal Alouettes

Awards and highlights
- Grey Cup champion (1949)

Rod Smith (1925–2016) was a Grey Cup champion Canadian Football League player. He played offensive guard.

A graduate of University of Toronto, Smith played at least one year with the Toronto Balmy Beach Beachers, and then took 1948 off from football (to work in South Africa). He joined the Montreal Alouettes in 1949 and was part of the Larks first Grey Cup championship. He worked as a civil engineer while playing with the Als.

After retiring from the CFL, he worked as a civil engineer in Colombia.
