= Rod Smith (R/C modeling pioneer) =

Rod Smith (born 1926) was a pioneer in radio-controlled model aviation. He began in the 1950s, building his own radio systems and flying them in Frank Zaic Thermic 100 or similar tow-line gliders. He was the father of Mark Smith who designed the “Windfree” Radio Controlled Sailplane, one of the most successful R/C kits in the history of the hobby.
