= Rod Smith (American football coach) =

American football player and coach (born 1973)

Biographical details
- Born: February 22, 1973 (age 53); Franklin, West Virginia, U.S.

Playing career
- 1993–1996: Glenville State
- Position: Quarterback

Coaching career (HC unless noted)
- 1997: Franklin HS (WV) (OC)
- 1998–1999: Urbana (OC)
- 2000: West Virginia Tech (OC)
- 2001: Clemson (GA)
- 2001: West Virginia (GA)
- 2001–2004: South Florida (PGC/QB)
- 2005–2006: South Florida (OC/QB)
- 2007: West Virginia (QB)
- 2008–2010: Michigan (QB)
- 2011: Indiana (co-OC/QB)
- 2012–2017: Arizona (co-OC/QB)
- 2018–2020: Illinois (OC/QB)
- 2020: Illinois (interim HC)
- 2021: Virginia (OA)
- 2022–2024: Jacksonville State (OC/QB)
- 2024: Jacksonville State (interim HC)
- 2025–2026: Marshall (OC/QB)

Head coaching record
- Overall: 0–2
- Bowls: 0–1

Rod Smith (born February 22, 1973) is an American football coach and former player who most recently served as the offensive coordinator at Marshall. Smith previously served as the interim head coach, offensive coordinator and quarterbacks coach at Jacksonville State and Illinois.

== Playing career ==
Smith played college football as a quarterback at Glenville State College from 1993 to 1996, where he played for head coach Rich Rodriguez.

== Coaching career ==
After graduating from Glenville State in 1997, Smith was hired to be the offensive coordinator on his father's coaching staff at Franklin High School in West Virginia. He spent time as the offensive coordinator at both Urbana University in Ohio and West Virginia Tech before reuniting with Rodriguez at both Clemson and West Virginia as a graduate assistant. He was hired by Jim Leavitt to be the passing game coordinator and quarterbacks coach at South Florida and was promoted to offensive coordinator for the 2005 season. Smith resigned from South Florida after the 2006 season to reunite with Rich Rodriguez at West Virginia as the team's quarterbacks coach.

=== Michigan ===
Smith was named the quarterbacks coach at Michigan in 2008 after Rich Rodriguez was named the head coach.

=== Indiana ===
After Rodriguez was fired from Michigan in 2010, Smith spent the 2011 season on Kevin Wilson's staff at Indiana as a co-offensive coordinator and the quarterbacks coach.

=== Arizona ===
After Rodriguez was hired to be the head coach Arizona in 2012, Smith joined Rodriguez's staff as the co-offensive coordinator and quarterbacks coach. Smith was a nominee for the Broyles Award given annually to the nation's top assistant coach, after the 2017 season at Arizona.

=== Illinois ===
After Rodriguez was fired from Arizona in 2018, Smith departed the Arizona coaching staff to join Lovie Smith's coaching staff at Illinois. He was named the interim head coach after Smith was terminated on December 13, 2020.

=== Virginia ===
Smith was hired by Virginia as an offensive analyst prior to the 2021 season, where he works with offensive coordinator Robert Anae. As of October 29, 2021, the Cavaliers lead the nation in passing offense. He left after the 2021 season.

=== Penn State ===
Smith was hired as an offensive analyst at Penn State in 2022.

=== Jacksonville State ===
Smith was named the offensive coordinator and quarterbacks coach at Jacksonville State on June 12, 2022. Smith was named interim head coach for the 2024 Cure Bowl after Rich Rodriguez resigned to take another coaching position.

=== Marshall ===
On December 21, 2024, it was reported Smith was named the offensive coordinator at Marshall under first-year head coach Tony Gibson. On November 15, 2026, it was announced Smith had been fired as offensive coordinator. The announcement came one day after the Thundering Herd lost to Appalachian State.

== Personal life ==
Smith and his wife Charlene have two children, Alex and Sasha. Alex is currently a defensive back at West Liberty University's football team.

== Head coaching record ==
Year	Team	Overall	Conference	Standing	Bowl/playoffs
Illinois Fighting Illini (Big Ten Conference) (2020)
2020	Illinois	0–1‡	0–1	7th (West)	
Illinois:		0–1	0–1	‡ Served as interim HC	
Jacksonville State Gamecocks (Conference USA) (2024)
2024	Jacksonville State	0–1‡			L Cure
Jacksonville State:		0–1		‡ Served as interim HC	
Total:		0–2			
