= Roderick Smith (professor) =

British mechanical engineer (1947–2024)

Roderick Thomas FREng
- Born: 26 December 1947; Oldham, UK
- Died: 26 December 2024 (aged 77); Lake District, UK
- Education: Hulme Grammar School
- Alma mater: St John's College, Oxford, University of Cambridge
- Scientific career
- Workplaces: University of Sheffield; Imperial College London
- Thesis: (1974)
- Website: profiles.imperial.ac.uk/roderick.smith

Roderick Arthur Smith (1947–2024) was a British professor of mechanical engineering specialising in fatigue and fracture of materials, particularly relating to rail travel, as well as a former UK government Chief Scientific Adviser An avid mountaineer, he died on his 77th birthday whilst hiking in the Lake District.

== Biography ==
Smith was born on 26 December 1947 in Oldham to Erik, a schoolteacher, and Gladys Smith and grew up in Greenfield, Saddleworth. His grandfather was a platelayer, to which he attributes his love of railway engineering. He attended Hulme Grammar School. As a child he enjoyed solo hiking and got into rock climbing, which became a lifelong interest. An active mountaineer, Smith completed ascents of all the Lake District Wainwrights, and led expeditions to Greenland, Arctic Norway, the Himalayas and the Karakoram. He was a member of the Alpine Club, Yorkshire Ramblers' Club, the Fell & Rock Climbing Club, and the Arctic Club. He also contributed various works to The Fell and Rock Journal, a mountaineering magazine, and wrote about the engineering of mountaineering. His interested in mountaineering also lead to his interest into ice and the mechanics behind the formation of crevasses.

Smith received a B.A. in Engineering Science at St. John's College, Oxford and a Ph.D. from the Department of Engineering at the University of Cambridge in 1974. His Ph.D. adviser was Keith John Miller, who like Smith was also a fatigue engineer and mountaineer. He married Yayoi Yamanoi Smith in 1975. He did his postdoc at Cambridge University and was an assistant lecturer there until 1988.

In 1988 he begin his career at the University of Sheffield as a Professor of Engineering and was head of the Department of Mechanical and Process Engineering there from 1992 to 1995. In 1999 he was elected a fellow of the Royal Academy of Engineering. In 2000 he left Sheffield to become a Professor of Engineering and head of the Department of Mechanical Engineering at Imperial College London. After stepping down from the headship in 2005, he remained a Professor there until his retirement whereupon he became a Professor Emeritus.

In 2011 he became the 126th president of the Institution of Mechanical Engineers. He was Chief Scientific Adviser for the Department for Transport from 2012-2014, where he advised on the HS2 project. An expert on metal fatigue and fracture, he served as an expert witness on transportation accidents, the effect of volcanic activity on airway travel, and the Hillsborough disaster. He was instrumental in importing the Shinkansen Bullet Train at the National Railway Museum, one of only two found outside of Japan.

== Death ==
Smith died on his 77th birthday, 26 December 2024, whilst hiking in the Lake District his family. An inquest found he died of unsurvivable head injuries after slipping and falling whilst crossing a stream.

== Publications ==
- Smith, R. A. (1986), Fatigue Crack Growth: Thirty Years of Progress, Pergamon, UK. ISBN 978-0-08-032547-7
- Smith, R. A. (1991), Innovative Teaching in Engineering, Longman Higher Education, UK. ISBN 978-0-13-457607-7
- Smith, R. A.; Dickie, J. F., eds. (1993). Engineering for Crowd Safety. Elsevier Science, Amsterdam. ISBN 978-0-44-489920-0
