= Seth McGowan =

American football player (born 2001)

No. 20 – Indianapolis Colts
- Position: Running back
- Roster status: Active

Personal information
- Born: October 23, 2001 (age 25); Dallas, Texas, U.S.
- Listed height: 6 ft 0 in (1.83 m)
- Listed weight: 223 lb (101 kg)

Career information
- High school: Poteet (Mesquite, Texas)
- College: Oklahoma (2020); Butler CC (2023); New Mexico State (2024); Kentucky (2025)
- NFL draft: 2026: 7th round, 237th overall pick

Career history
- Indianapolis Colts (2026–present)

Awards and highlights
- Second-team All-CUSA (2024)

Career NFL statistics as of Week 4, 2026
- Rushing yards: 45
- Rushing average: 3.8
- Receptions: 2
- Receiving yards: 7
- Stats at Pro Football Reference

Seth McGowan (born October 23, 2001) is an American professional football running back for the Indianapolis Colts of the National Football League (NFL). He played college football for the Oklahoma Sooners, the New Mexico State Aggies, the Butler Grizzlies, and the Kentucky Wildcats. McGowan was selected by the Colts in the seventh round of the 2026 NFL draft.

== Early life ==
McGowan attended Poteet High School in Mesquite, Texas. Coming out of high school, he was rated as a four-star recruit and committed to play college football for the Oklahoma Sooners.

== College career ==
=== Oklahoma ===
As a freshman in 2020, McGowan rushed for 370 yards and three touchdowns and hauled in 13 receptions for 201 yards and a touchdown, before being dismissed from the team.

=== Butler CC ===
McGowan committed to Butler Community College after being out of football for two years and spending a season at Texas College, where he did not appear in any games. In his lone season at Butler CC in 2023, he rushed for 125 yards and four touchdowns on 39 carries in six games.

=== New Mexico State ===
McGowan transferred to play for the New Mexico State Aggies. In the 2024 season opener (his first FBS game since being dismissed from Oklahoma in 2021), he ran for 87 yards and two touchdowns on 11 carries in a victory over Southeast Missouri State. In week 13, McGowan totaled 83 rushing yards, 96 receiving yards, and a touchdown in a win against Middle Tennessee State. He finished the 2024 season with 152 carries for 823 rushing yards and three touchdowns to go with 23 catches for 277 yards and three touchdowns, earning second team all-Conference. After the season, McGowan entered his name into the NCAA transfer portal.

=== Kentucky ===
McGowan transferred to play for the Kentucky Wildcats. In week 2 of the 2025 season, he notched 93 yards and two touchdowns versus Ole Miss. In week 11, McGowan rushed 22 times for 92 yards and two touchdowns in a blowout win over Florida. In week 12, he posted 72 yards and three touchdowns on a Senior Day victory over Tennessee Tech. McGowan finished the 2025 season with 725 rushing yards and 12 touchdowns to go with 19 receptions, and accepted an invite to participate in the 2026 Senior Bowl.

== Professional career ==
Pre-draft measurables
Height	Weight	Arm length	Hand span	Wingspan	40-yard dash	10-yard split	20-yard split	20-yard shuttle	Vertical jump	Broad jump
6 ft 0 1/4 in (1.84 m)	223 lb (101 kg)	31 3/8 in (0.80 m)	8 3/4 in (0.22 m)	6 ft 5 1/8 in (1.96 m)	4.49 s	1.60 s	2.62 s	4.40 s	42.5 in (1.08 m)	10 ft 11 in (3.33 m)
All values from NFL Combine/Pro Day

McGowan was selected by the Indianapolis Colts in the seventh round with the 238th overall pick of the 2026 NFL draft. He signed his rookie contract on May 8.

=== 2026 ===
McGowan scored his first NFL touchdown in Week 9 against the Dallas Cowboys, on a 2 yard rush.

== Personal life ==
On May 7, 2021, an arrest warrant was issued for McGowan on felony charges of robbery, conspiracy and assault, and battery with a dangerous weapon. Ultimately, he spent three months in jail after pleading guilty, while also being sentenced to one year of probation.
