= Quinton Cooley =

American football player (born 2001)

Profile
- Position: Running back

Personal information
- Born: May 18, 2001 (age 25); Bailey, North Carolina , U.S.
- Listed height: 5 ft 7 in (1.70 m)
- Listed weight: 214 lb (97 kg)

Career information
- High school: Southern Nash (Bailey)
- College: Wake Forest (2020–2022); Liberty (2023–2024)
- NFL draft: 2025: undrafted

Career history
- Winnipeg Blue Bombers (2025)

Awards and highlights
- C-USA Newcomer of the Year (2023); 2× First-team All-C-USA (2023, 2024)
- Stats at CFL.ca

Quinton Cooley (born May 18, 2001) is an American football running back. He played college football for the Wake Forest Demon Deacons and Liberty Flames.

== Early life ==
Cooley attended Southern Nash High School in Bailey, North Carolina. As a senior, Cooley ran for 3,058 yards and 55 touchdowns, before committing to play college football at Wake Forest University.

== College career ==
Cooley played sparingly in three seasons at Wake Forest, totaling 92 carries for 371 yards and four touchdowns before transferring to Liberty University. In his first season with Liberty, he rushed for 1,401 yards and 16 touchdowns. Against Jacksonville State, Cooley rushed for a career-high 28 carries with 163 yards rushing and two touchdowns. At the conclusion of the season, he was named the C-USA Newcomer of the Year.

=== Statistics ===
Year	Team	Games	Rushing				Receiving			
Year	Team	GP	Att	Yards	Avg	TD	Rec	Yards	Avg	TD
2020	Wake Forest	1	0	0	0.0	0	0	0	0.0	0
2021	Wake Forest	13	45	156	3.5	1	1	5	5.0	0
2022	Wake Forest	12	51	246	4.8	3	3	25	8.3	0
2023	Liberty	14	221	1,401	6.3	16	6	43	7.2	0
2024	Liberty	11	205	1,254	6.1	13	1	9	9.0	0
Career		51	522	3,057	5.9	33	11	82	7.5	0

== Professional career ==
On May 2, 2025, Cooley signed with the Winnipeg Blue Bombers of the Canadian Football League. He was released on August 17, 2025.
