= Caden Veltkamp =

American football player (born 2003)

- Veltkamp with Florida Atlantic in 2026

No. 10 – Florida Atlantic Owls
- Position: Quarterback
- Class: Redshirt Senior

Personal information
- Born: March 5, 2003 (age 23)
- Listed height: 6 ft 5 in (1.96 m)
- Listed weight: 236 lb (107 kg)

Career information
- High school: South Warren (Bowling Green, Kentucky)
- College: Western Kentucky (2022–2024); Florida Atlantic (2025–present)

Awards and highlights
- CUSA Offensive Player of the Year (2024); Second-team All-CUSA (2024)

Caden Veltkamp (born March 5, 2003) is an American college football quarterback who plays for the Florida Atlantic Owls. He previously played for the Western Kentucky Hilltoppers.

== Early life ==
Veltkamp attended South Warren High School in Bowling Green, Kentucky. He won two Kentucky High School State Football Championships. He was rated as a three-star recruit and committed to play for the Western Kentucky Hilltoppers.

== College career ==
=== Western Kentucky ===
As a freshman in 2022, Veltkamp appeared in just one game where he completed all four of his pass attempts for 25 yards. In the 2023 Famous Toastery Bowl, he came in for relief and threw for 383 yards and five touchdowns in a comeback overtime win over Old Dominion. Veltkamp finished the 2023 season completing 41 of his 54 passes for 387 yards and five touchdowns to one interception, while also adding 76 yards on the ground. In Week 3 of the 2024 season, he came in for relief for injured starter T. J. Finley and completed 27 of 30 pass attempts for 398 yards and five touchdowns, while also adding a touchdown on the ground, in a win over Middle Tennessee State. For his performance, Veltkamp was named the Conference USA offensive player of the week, a member of Davey O’Brien Award's Great 8 list and a Manning Award Star of the Week. Heading into Week 4, he was named the team's starting quarterback, set to make his first career start. In Veltkamp's first career start, he completed 20 of 30 passing attempts for 242 yards and a touchdown, while also adding two touchdowns on the ground, in a comeback win over Toledo. Veltkamp was named the 2024 Conference USA Offensive Player of the Year.

On December 10, 2024, Veltkamp announced that he would enter the transfer portal.

=== Florida Atlantic ===
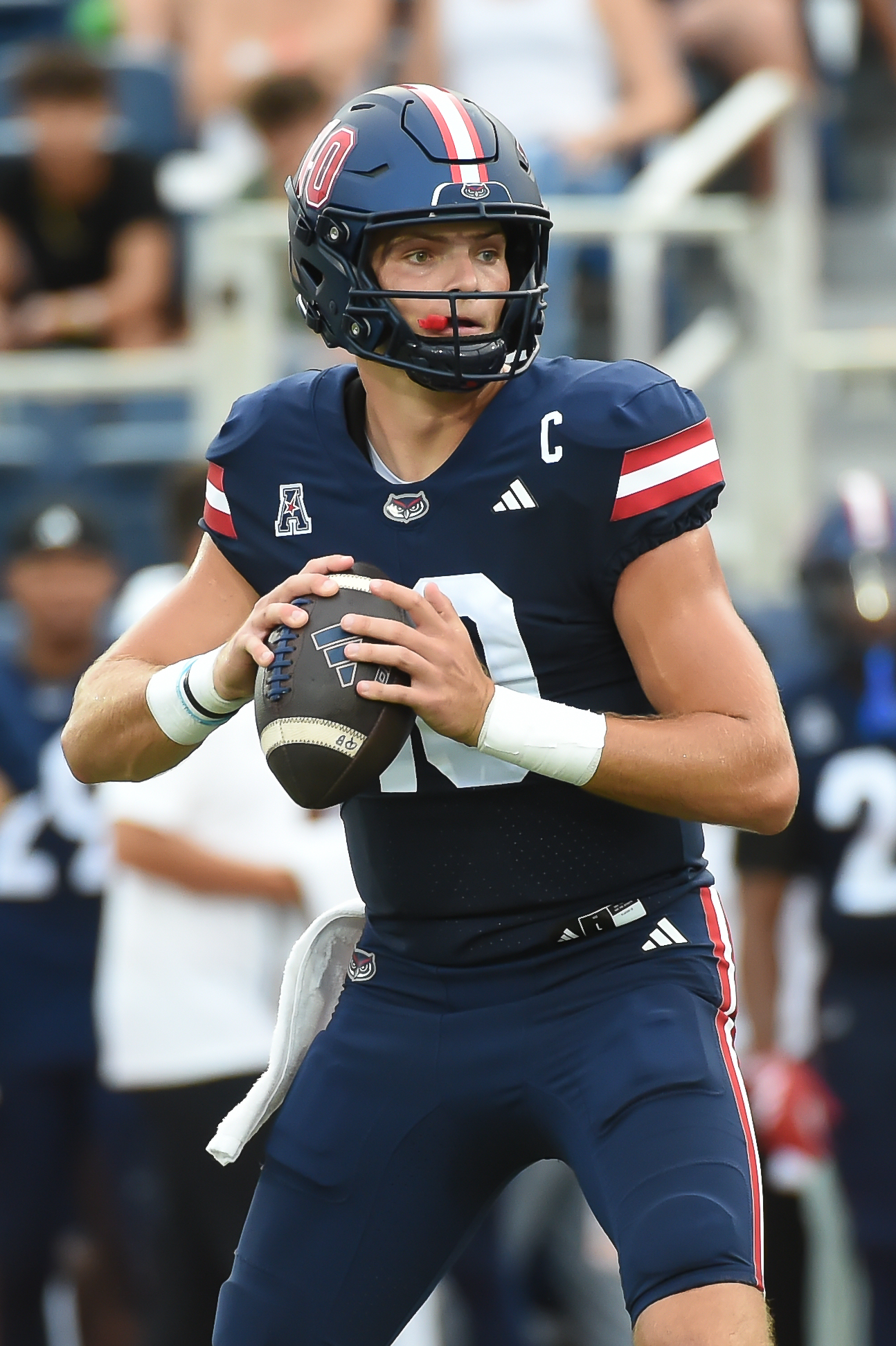
Veltkamp with Florida Atlantic in 2025

He committed to FAU shortly thereafter, reuniting with former Western Kentucky offensive coordinator Zach Kittley, who had been named FAU's head coach in December 2024.

As a redshirt junior in 2025, Veltkamp became the starting quarterback for the Owls in the American Athletic Conference. He had a record-setting season, leading the nation in completions per game and setting multiple FAU single-season and single-game program records, including 494 passing yards and 42 completions in a game against UConn. Notable performances included a 494-yard, four-total-touchdown effort (two passing, two rushing) against UConn. He played much of the season with a throwing shoulder injury and led a high-volume passing attack.

FAU finished the 2025 season with a 4–8 record (improving by one win from the prior year). Following the season, head coach Kittley confirmed that Veltkamp would return for the 2026 season.

=== Statistics ===
Legend
	Led the NCAA
**Bold**	Career high

Year	Team	Games			Passing								Rushing			
Year	Team	GP	GS	Record	Cmp	Att	Pct	Yds	Y/A	TD	Int	Rtg	Att	Yds	Avg	TD
2022	Western Kentucky	1	0	—	4	4	**100.0**	25	6.3	0	0	152.5	0	0	0.0	0
2023	Western Kentucky	3	0	—	41	54	75.9	387	7.2	5	1	**163.0**	23	76	**3.3**	0
2024	Western Kentucky	13	11	6–5	258	389	66.3	3,108	**8.0**	25	10	149.5	**113**	**150**	1.3	**7**
2025	Florida Atlantic	12	12	4–8	**345**	**515**	67.0	**3,641**	7.1	24	**17**	135.2	81	45	0.6	4
2026	Florida Atlantic	11	11	**7–4**	306	437	70.0	3,472	7.9	**33**	6	158.9	61	-18	-0.3	2
Career		40	34	17–17	954	1,399	68.2	10,633	7.6	87	34	147.7	278	253	0.9	13
