= 2024 Louisiana–Monroe Warhawks football team =

American college football season

2024 Louisiana–Monroe Warhawks football
- Conference: Sun Belt Conference
- West Division
- Record: 5–7 (3–5 Sun Belt)
- Head coach: Bryant Vincent (1st season)
- Offensive scheme: Spread option
- Defensive coordinator: Earnest Hill (1st season)
- Base defense: 4–2–5
- Home stadium: Malone Stadium

2024 Sun Belt Conference football standings
	Conf.			Overall
Team	W		L	W		L
East Division
Marshall xy$	7	–	1	10	–	3
Georgia Southern	6	–	2	8	–	5
James Madison	4	–	4	9	–	4
Old Dominion	4	–	4	5	–	7
Coastal Carolina	3	–	5	6	–	7
Appalachian State	3	–	5	5	–	6
Georgia State	1	–	7	3	–	9
West Division
Louisiana xy	7	–	1	10	–	4
Texas State	5	–	3	8	–	5
Arkansas State	5	–	3	8	–	5
South Alabama	5	–	3	7	–	6
Louisiana–Monroe	3	–	5	5	–	7
Troy	3	–	5	4	–	8
Southern Miss	0	–	8	1	–	11
Championship: Marshall 31, Louisiana 3
$ – Conference champion; x – Division champion/co-champions; y – Championship game participant

The 2024 Louisiana–Monroe Warhawks football team represented the University of Louisiana at Monroe in the Sun Belt Conference's West Division during the 2024 NCAA Division I FBS football season. The Warhawks were led by Bryant Vincent in his first year as the head coach. The Warhawks played their home games at Malone Stadium, located in Monroe, Louisiana.

== Preseason ==
=== Media poll ===
In the Sun Belt preseason coaches' poll, the Warhawks were picked to finish last place in the West division.

== Schedule ==
The football schedule was announced on March 1, 2024.

Date	Time	Opponent	Site	TV	Result	Attendance
August 29	6:00 p.m.	Jackson State*	Malone Stadium; Monroe, LA	ESPN+	W 30–14	11,145
September 7	6:00 p.m.	UAB*	Malone Stadium; Monroe, LA	ESPN+	W 32–6	12,327
September 21	7:00 p.m.	at No. 1 Texas*	Darrell K Royal–Texas Memorial Stadium; Austin, TX	SECN+	L 3–51	102,850
September 28	6:00 p.m.	at Troy	Veterans Memorial Stadium; Troy, AL	ESPN+	W 13–9	21,253
October 5	6:00 p.m.	James Madison	Malone Stadium; Monroe, LA	ESPNU	W 21–19	19,976
October 12	4:00 p.m.	Southern Miss^{†}	Malone Stadium; Monroe, LA	ESPN+	W 38–21	22,645
October 26	4:00 p.m.	at South Alabama	Hancock Whitney Stadium; Mobile, AL	ESPN+	L 17–46	16,746
November 2	2:30 p.m.	at Marshall	Joan C. Edwards Stadium; Huntington, WV	ESPN+	L 23–28	21,478
November 9	11:00 a.m.	Texas State	Malone Stadium; Monroe, LA	ESPNU	L 17–38	13,720
November 16	11:45 a.m.	at Auburn*	Jordan-Hare Stadium; Auburn, AL	SECN	L 14–48	88,043
November 23	2:00 p.m.	at Arkansas State	Centennial Bank Stadium; Jonesboro, AR	ESPN+	L 21–28	14,029
November 30	11:00 a.m.	Louisiana	Malone Stadium; Monroe, LA (Battle on the Bayou)	ESPNU	L 23–37	15,006
*Non-conference game; ^{†}Homecoming; Rankings from AP Poll and CFP Rankings released prior to game; All times are in Central time

== Personnel ==
=== Transfers ===
Outgoing
Player	Position	Destination
Joseph Bakhole	EDGE	Unknown
John Barr	WR	Unknown
Michael Batton	LB	Houston
Evan Blalock	S	Unknown
Carmelo Crump	IOL	Unknown
Tristan Driggers	LB	Unknown
Thad Franklin Jr.	RB	Unknown
Preston Harris	LB	Texas State
Max Harris	S	Texas State
Simion Hines	S	Unknown
Adin Huntington	DL	Tulane
Bryson Jordan	DL	Unknown
Devante Keys	Edge	Unknown
Keydrell Lewis	OT	Memphis
Tellek Lockette	IOL	Texas State
Alred Luke	WR	Unknown
Norman Massey	LV	Unknown
Derek McCormick	K	Indiana
Qway McCoy	LB	Unknown
Zarian McGill	IOL	Louisiana Tech
Jim Ogle	QB	Unknown
Kenard Snyder	EDGE	Iowa State
Lu Tillery	CB	Tulane
Andrew Volmar	CB	Unknown
AJ Watts	S	Memphis
Antwone Watts	S	Unknown
Dariyan Wiley	WR	Nevada
Stacey Wilkins	OT	Unknown

Incoming
Player	Position	Previous Team
Austin Ackel	LB	New Mexico
Aidan Armenta	QB	New Mexico
General Booty	QB	Oklahoma
Taven Curry	RB	UAB
Carl Fauntroy	S	UAB
Jacob Godfey	WR	New Mexico
Tyler Griffin	WR	UCF
Seidrion Langston	LB	Coffeyville C.C. (KS)
Wyatt McClour	TE	New Mexico
Carter Miller	IOL	James Madison
Reese Mooney	QB	Liberty
Devon Smith	OT	New Mexico
Reese Steele	IOL	New Mexico
Sam Telesa	IOL	New Mexico
Wydett Williams Jr.	S	Delta State

== Game summaries ==
=== vs. Jackson State (FCS) ===
Game One – Jackson State Tigers (FCS) (0-0) at Louisiana-Monroe Warhawks (0-0) – Game summary

Quarter	1	2	3	4	Total
Tigers (FCS)	0	7	7	0	14
Warhawks	7	7	7	9	30

at Malone Stadium • Monroe, LA

- Date: Thursday August 29, 2024
- Game time: 6:00 p.m.
- Game attendance: 11,145
- Referee: Scott Broadway
- TV announcers (ESPN+): Sean Fox (play-by-play) and Desmund Lighten (analyst)

Game information

First quarter

- (2:35) ULM – Davon Wells 11-yard pass from General Booty (Max Larson kick) (Drive: 10 plays, 78 yards, 5:50; Louisiana-Monroe 7-0)

Second quarter

- (10:51) JSU – Joanes Fortillen 41-yard pass from Jacobian Morgan (Gerardo Baeza kick) (Drive: 1 play, 41 yards, 0:10; Tied 7-7)
- (0:14) ULM – Ahmad Hardy 1-yard run (Max Larson kick) (Drive: 9 plays, 42 yards, 4:53; Louisiana-Monroe 14-7)

Third quarter

- (11:41) JSU – Jacobian Morgan 3-yard run (Gerardo Baeza kick) (Drive: 7 plays, 75 yards, 3:19; Tied 14-14)
- (7:32) ULM – James Jones 22-yard run (Max Larson kick) (Drive: 9 plays, 85 yards, 4:04; Louisiana-Monroe 21-14)

Fourth quarter

- (10:21) ULM – Max Larson 39-yard field goal (Drive: 8 plays, 40 yards, 4:33; Louisiana-Monroe 24-14)
- (2:27) ULM – Javon Campbell 28-yard pass from Aidan Armenta (PAT blocked) (Drive: 3 plays, 33 yards, 1:01; Louisiana-Monroe 30-14)

Statistics	JKST	ULM
First downs	16	17
Total yards	51–288	56–336
Rushing yards	22–61	41–204
Passing yards	227	132
Passing: Comp–Att–Int	24–29–1	11–15–0
Time of possession	25:11	34:49

Team	Category	Player	Statistics
Jackson State	Passing	Jacobian Morgan	23/28, 228 yards, TD, INT
Jackson State	Rushing	Ahmad Miller	9 carries, 46 yards
Jackson State	Receiving	Joanes Fortillen	2 receptions, 51 yards, TD
Louisiana-Monroe	Passing	General Booty	10/14, 104 yards, TD
Louisiana-Monroe	Rushing	Ahmad Hardy	19 carries, 103 yards, TD
Louisiana-Monroe	Receiving	Javon Campbell	4 receptions, 83 yards, TD

=== vs. UAB ===
Game Two – UAB Blazers (1–0) at Louisiana-Monroe Warhawks (1–0) – Game summary

Quarter	1	2	3	4	Total
Blazers	3	3	0	0	6
Warhawks	3	10	9	10	32

at Malone Stadium • Monroe, LA

- Date: Saturday September 7, 2024
- Game time: 6:00 p.m.
- Game weather: 80 °F (27 °C)
- Game attendance: 12,327
- Referee: Tim Barker
- TV announcers (ESPN+): Sean Fox (play-by-play) and Desmund Lighten (analyst)

Game information

First quarter

- (9:19) ULM – Max Larson 26 yd field goal (Drive: 8 plays, 24 yards, 4:21; ULM 3–0)
- (6:34) UAB – Jonah Delange 46 yd field goal (Drive: 10 plays, 48 yards, 2:45; Tied 3–3)

Second quarter

- (14:10) ULM – Ahmad Hardy 16 yard run, Max Larson kick (Drive: 3 plays, 24 yards, 1:06; ULM 10–3)
- (7:34) UAB – Jonah Delange 26 yd field goal (Drive: 15 plays, 70 yards, 6:30; ULM 10–6)
- (0:03) ULM – Max Larson 37 yd field goal (Drive: 7 plays, 19 yards, 1:54; ULM 13–6)

Third quarter

- (10:19) ULM – Billy Pullen 0 yard safety (ULM 15–6)
- (4:52) ULM – Hunter Herring 4 yard run, Max Larson kick (Drive: 9 plays, 61 yards, 5:23; ULM 22–6)

Fourth quarter

- (10:34) ULM – Car'lin Vigers 30 yard interception, Max Larson kick (ULM 29–6)
- (3:36) ULM – Max Larson 40 yd field goal (Drive: 5 plays, 15 yards, 2:09; ULM 32–6)

Statistics	UAB	ULM
First downs	18	18
Total yards	68–259	64–296
Rushing yards	35–92	48–209
Passing yards	167	87
Passing: Comp–Att–Int	22–32–1	9–16–0
Time of possession	26:45	33:15

Team	Category	Player	Statistics
UAB	Passing	Jacob Zeno	22/32, 167 yards, 1 INT
UAB	Rushing	Lee Beebe Jr.	14 carries, 62 yards
UAB	Receiving	Kam Shanks	4 receptions, 43 yards
Louisiana-Monroe	Passing	General Booty	9/16, 87 yards
Louisiana-Monroe	Rushing	Taven Curry	13 carries, 64 yards
Louisiana-Monroe	Receiving	Nate Sullivan Jr.	2 receptions, 22 yards

=== at No. 1 Texas ===
Game Three – Louisiana–Monroe Warhawks (2–0) at No. 1 Texas Longhorns (3–0)

Quarter	1	2	3	4	Total
Warhawks	0	3	0	0	3
No. 1 Longhorns	21	7	9	14	51

at Darrell K Royal–Texas Memorial Stadium, Austin, TX

- Date: Saturday September 21, 2024
- Game time: 7:00 p.m. CDT
- Game weather: Sunny • Temperature: 95 °F (35 °C)
- Game attendance: 102,850
- Referee: Kyle Olson
- TV announcers (ESPN+/SECN+): Lowell Galindo (play-by-play, Fozzy Whittaker (analyst) and Alex Chappell (sideline)

Game information

First Quarter

- (7:11) TEX – Jaydon Blue 1-yard run, Bert Auburn kick (Drive: 7 plays, 77 yards, 2:49; Texas 7–0)
- (5:28) TEX – Jaydon Blue 3-yard pass from Arch Manning, Bert Auburn kick (Drive: 4 plays, 13 yards, 0:58; Texas 14–0)
- (1:34) TEX – Ryan Wingo 17-yard pass from Arch Manning, Bert Auburn kick (Drive: 6 plays, 73 yards, 2:06; Texas 21–0)

Second Quarter

- (8:15) TEX – Jaydon Blue 2-yard run, Bert Auburn kick (Drive: 12 plays, 87 yards, 5:11; Texas 28–0)
- (1:46) ULM – Max Larson 35-yard field goal (Drive: 13 plays, 58 yards, 6:29; Texas 28–3)

Third Quarter

- (11:04) TEX – Jerrick Gibson 2-yard run, Bert Auburn kick (Drive: 6 plays, 66 yards, 2:20; Texas 35–3)
- (3:24) TEX – Ozzario Smith tackled in end zone for a safety by Liona Lefau (Texas 37–3)

Fourth Quarter

- (14:56) TEX – Jaydon Blue 1-yard run, Bert Auburn kick (Drive: 9 plays, 63 yards, 3:21; Texas 44–3)
- (8:18) TEX – Ryan Niblett 1-yard run, Bert Auburn kick (Drive: 10 plays, 57 yards, 4:35; Texas 51–3)

Statistics	ULM	TEX
First downs	7	26
Total yards	111	497
Rushing yards	57	239
Passing yards	54	258
Passing: Comp–Att–Int	11–25–2	15–29–2
Time of possession	26:27	33:33

Team	Category	Player	Statistics
Louisiana–Monroe	Passing	General Booty	8/19, 42 yards, INT
Louisiana–Monroe	Rushing	Taven Curry	6 carries, 30 yards
Louisiana–Monroe	Receiving	Julian Nixon	1 reception, 23 yards
Texas	Passing	Arch Manning	15/29, 258 yards, 2 TD, 2 INT
Texas	Rushing	Jaydon Blue	25 carries, 124 yards, 3 TD
Texas	Receiving	Isaiah Bond	2 receptions, 75 yards

=== at Troy ===
Game Four – Louisiana–Monroe Warhawks (2–1) at Troy Trojans (1–3)

Quarter	1	2	3	4	Total
Warhawks	3	0	3	7	13
Trojans	3	3	0	3	9

at Veterans Memorial Stadium, Troy, AL

- Date: Saturday September 28, 2024
- Game time: 6:00 p.m. CDT
- Game weather: Sunny • Temperature: 78 °F (26 °C) • Wind: NE 4 mph
- Game attendance: 21,253
- Referee: Trennis Livingston
- TV announcers (ESPN+): Will Kollmeyer (play-by-play), Ben Stanfield (analyst) and Junior Louissaint (sideline)

Game information

First Quarter

- (9:02) TRO – Scott Taylor Renfroe 37-yard field goal (Drive: 13 plays, 56 yards, 5:58; Troy 3–0)
- (3:09) ULM – Max Larson 42-yard field goal (Drive: 11 plays, 51 yards, 5:53; Tied 3–3)

Second Quarter

- (0:57) TRO – Scott Taylor Renfroe 49-yard field goal (Drive: 10 plays, 47 yards, 3:47; Troy 6–3)

Third Quarter

- (4:07) ULM – Max Larson 20-yard field goal (Drive: 9 plays, 71 yards, 6:05; Tied 6–6)

Fourth Quarter

- (14:36) TRO – Scott Taylor Renfroe 36-yard field goal (Drive: 10 plays, 59 yards, 4:26; Troy 9–6)
- (9:08) ULM – Ahmad Hardy 1-yard run, Max Larson kick (Drive: 8 plays, 75 yards, 5:28; Louisiana–Monroe 13–9)

Statistics	ULM	TROY
First downs	13	17
Total yards	247	260
Rushing yards	112	189
Passing yards	135	71
Passing: Comp–Att–Int	6–11–1	7–12–0
Time of possession	29:29	30:31

Team	Category	Player	Statistics
Louisiana–Monroe	Passing	Aidan Armenta	4/6, 108 yards
Louisiana–Monroe	Rushing	Ahmad Hardy	27 carries, 106 yards, TD
Louisiana–Monroe	Receiving	Jake Godfrey	1 reception, 57 yards
Troy	Passing	Tucker Kilcrease	6/11, 57 yards
Troy	Rushing	Gerald Green	13 carries, 102 yards
Troy	Receiving	Zeriah Beason	2 receptions, 30 yards

=== James Madison ===
Game Five – James Madison Dukes (4–0) at Louisiana–Monroe Warhawks (3–1) – Game summary

Quarter	1	2	3	4	Total
Dukes	10	3	0	6	19
Warhawks	0	14	0	7	21

at Malone Stadium • Monroe, LA

- Date: Saturday October 5, 2024
- Game time: 6:00 p.m.
- Game weather: Sunny • Temperature: 91 °F (33 °C) • Wind: NE at 8 miles per hour (13 km/h)
- Game attendance: 19,976
- Referee: Marshall Lewis
- TV announcers (ESPNU): Jay Alter (play-by-play) and Rocky Boiman (analyst)

Game information

First quarter

- (12:42) JMU – Alonza Barnett III 27-yard run, Noe Ruelas kick (Drive: 6 plays, 67 yards, 2:12; James Madison 7–0)
- (8:56) JMU – Noe Ruelas 48-yard field goal (Drive: 4 plays, -3 yards, 1:23; James Madison 10–0)

Second quarter

- (5:45) ULM – Ahmad Hardy 38-yard run, Max Larson kick (Drive: 6 plays, 50 yards, 3:04; James Madison 10–7)
- (1:31) ULM – Daniel Knudsen 82-yard fumble recovery, Max Larson kick (Louisiana–Monroe 14–10)
- (0:00) JMU – Noe Ruelas 39-yard field goal (Drive: 10 plays, 63 yards, 1:23; Louisiana–Monroe 14–13)

Third quarter

No scoring plays

Fourth quarter

- (10:30) ULM – Jake Godfrey 12-yard pass from Aidan Armenta, Max Larson kick (Drive: 11 plays, 63 yards, 7:13; Louisiana–Monroe 21–13)
- (4:04) JMU – Tyler Purdy 1-yard run (Drive: 15 plays, 75 yards, 6:26; Louisiana–Monroe 21–19)

Statistics	JMU	ULM
First downs	24	15
Total yards	399	257
Rushing yards	148	110
Passing yards	251	147
Passing: Comp–Att–Int	20–47–0	17–30–1
Time of possession	28:56	31:04

Team	Category	Player	Statistics
James Madison	Passing	Alonza Barnett III	20/47, 251 yards
James Madison	Rushing	George Pettaway	13 carries, 62 yards
James Madison	Receiving	Yamir Knight	4 receptions, 67 yards
Louisiana–Monroe	Passing	Aidan Armenta	17/30, 147 yards, TD, INT
Louisiana–Monroe	Rushing	Ahmad Hardy	14 carries, 82 yards, TD
Louisiana–Monroe	Receiving	Jake Godfrey	7 receptions, 60 yards, TD

=== Southern Miss ===
Game Six – Southern Miss Golden Eagles (1–4) at Louisiana–Monroe Warhawks (4–1) – Game summary

Quarter	1	2	3	4	Total
Golden Eagles	3	3	8	7	21
Warhwaks	7	7	3	21	38

at Malone Stadium • Monroe, LA

- Date: Saturday October 12, 2024
- Game time: 4:00 p.m.
- Game weather: Sunny • Temperature: 89 °F (32 °C) • Wind: S at 6 miles per hour (9.7 km/h)
- Game attendance: 22,645
- Referee: Scott Broadway
- TV announcers (ESPN+): Sean Fox (play-by-play) and Desmund Lighten (analyst)

Game information

First quarter

- (3:08) USM – Connor Gibbs 22-yard field goal (Drive: 11 plays, 59 yards, 5:35; Southern Miss 3–0)
- (0:00) ULM – Ahmad Hardy 34-yard run, Max Larson kick (Drive: 6 plays, 75 yards, 3:07; Louisiana–Monroe 7–3)

Second quarter

- (13:19) ULM – James Jones 36-yard pass from Aidan Armenta, Max Larson kick (Drive: 3 plays, 43 yards, 0:55; Louisiana–Monroe 14–3)
- (0:02) USM – Connor Gibbs 37-yard field goal (Drive: 7 plays, 80 yards, 1:39; Louisiana–Monroe 14–6)

Third quarter

- (8:50) ULM – Max Larson 47-yard field goal (Drive: 7 plays, 43 yards, 4:05; Louisiana–Monroe 17–6)
- (2:08) USM – Braxton Myers 69-yard blocked field goal return, Tiaquelin Mims pass (Louisiana–Monroe 17–14)

Fourth quarter

- (14:09) ULM – Julian Nixon 6-yard pass from Aidan Armenta, Max Larson kick (Drive: 6 plays, 75 yards, 2:58; Louisiana–Monroe 24–14)
- (9:04) ULM – Aidan Armenta 4-yard run, Max Larson kick (Drive: 6 plays, 49 yards, 3:28; Louisiana–Monroe 31–14)
- (2:43) ULM – Ahmad Hardy 31-yard run, Luke Stagg kick (Drive: 2 plays, 34 yards, 0:55; Louisiana–Monroe 38–14)
- (0:22) ULM – Kenyon Clay 1-yard run, Connor Gibbs kick (Drive: 9 plays, 78 yards, 2:16; Louisiana–Monroe 38–21)

Statistics	USM	ULM
First downs	18	17
Total yards	347	432
Rushing yards	182	246
Passing yards	165	186
Passing: Comp–Att–Int	9–26–1	12–19–0
Time of possession	26:45	33:15

Team	Category	Player	Statistics
Southern Miss	Passing	Ethan Crawford	9/26, 165 yards, INT
Southern Miss	Rushing	Ethan Crawford	17 carries, 70 yards
Southern Miss	Receiving	Dannis Jackson	1 reception, 47 yards
Louisiana–Monroe	Passing	Aidan Armenta	10/17, 188 yards, 2 TD
Louisiana–Monroe	Rushing	Ahmad Hardy	15 carries, 121 yards, 2 TD
Louisiana–Monroe	Receiving	Ahmad Hardy	2 receptions, 53 yards

=== at South Alabama ===
Game Seven – Louisiana–Monroe Warhawks (5–1) at South Alabama Jaguars (3–4)

Quarter	1	2	3	4	Total
Warhawks	7	10	0	0	17
Jaguars	7	5	20	14	46

at Hancock Whitney Stadium, Mobile, AL

- Date: Saturday October 26, 2024
- Game time: 4:00 p.m. CDT
- Game weather: Sunny • Temperature: 87 °F (31 °C) • Wind: W 3 mph
- Game attendance: 16,746
- Referee: Steven Robinson
- TV announcers (ESPN+): Pat Greenwood (play-by-play) and Brian Genard (analyst)

Game information

First Quarter

- (10:19) USA – Kentrel Bullock 4-yard run, Laith Marjan kick (Drive: 8 plays, 70 yards, 3:00; South Alabama 7–0)
- (8:07) ULM – Davon Wells 51-yard pass from Aidan Armenta, Max Larson kick (Drive: 4 plays, 64 yards, 2:12; Tied 7–7)

Second Quarter

- (10:06) ULM – Hunter Herring 44-yard run, Max Larson kick (Drive: 6 plays, 80 yards, 2:56; Louisiana–Monroe 14–7)
- (4:33) USA – 0-yard safety (Louisiana–Monroe 14–9)
- (2:24) USA – Laith Marjan 48-yard field goal (Drive: 7 plays, 28 yards, 2:02; Louisiana–Monroe 14–12)
- (0:00) ULM – Max Larson 28-yard field goal (Drive: 6 plays, 70 yards, 1:08; Louisiana–Monroe 17–12)

Third Quarter

- (11:56) USA – Fluff Bothwell 3-yard run, Laith Marjan kick (Drive: 9 plays, 74 yards, 2:58; South Alabama 19–17)
- (9:45) USA – Kentrel Bullock 13-yard run (Drive: 5 plays, 28 yards, 2:02; South Alabama 25–17)
- (3:13) USA – Gio Lopez 5-yard run, Laith Marjan kick (Drive: 9 plays, 60 yards, 3:55; South Alabama 32–17)

Fourth Quarter

- (3:54) USA – Fluff Bothwell 1-yard run, Laith Marjan kick (Drive: 11 plays, 93 yards, 6:29; South Alabama 39–17)
- (1:47) USA – Braylon McReynolds 24-yard run, Laith Marjan kick (Drive: 2 plays, 36 yards, 0:15; South Alabama 46–17)

Statistics	ULM	USA
First downs	15	28
Total yards	387	523
Rushing yards	238	355
Passing yards	149	168
Passing: Comp–Att–Int	11–24–2	18–30–0
Time of possession	30:00	30:00

Team	Category	Player	Statistics
Louisiana–Monroe	Passing	Aidan Armenta	11/23, 149 yards, TD, 2 INT
Louisiana–Monroe	Rushing	Ahmad Hardy	20 carries, 104 yards
Louisiana–Monroe	Receiving	Javon Campbell	2 receptions, 77 yards
South Alabama	Passing	Gio Lopez	18/30, 168 yards
South Alabama	Rushing	Kentrel Bullock	18 carries, 141 yards, 2 TD
South Alabama	Receiving	Jamaal Pritchett	11 receptions, 89 yards

=== at Marshall ===
Game Eight – Louisiana–Monroe Warhawks (5–2) at Marshall Thundering Herd (4–3) – Game summary

Quarter	1	2	3	4	Total
Warhawks	7	7	0	9	23
Thundering Herd	7	7	0	14	28

at Joan C. Edwards Stadium • Huntington, WV

- Date: Saturday November 2, 2024
- Game time: 2:30 p.m.
- Game weather: Sunny
- Game attendance: 21,478
- Referee: Ted Pitts
- TV announcers (ESPN+): Mark Martin (play-by-play) and Keith Morehouse (analyst)

Game information

First quarter

- (6:47) MRSH – A. J. Turner 6 yard run, Rece Verhoff kick (Drive: 6 plays, 38 yards, 2:37; Marshall 7–0)
- (3:39) ULM – James Jones 41 yard pass from Aidan Armenta, Max Larson kick (Drive: 6 plays, 75 yards, 3:08; Tied 7–7)

Second quarter

- (10:33) ULM – Ahmad Hardy 80 yard run, Max Larson kick (Drive: 1 play, 80 yards, 0:11; Louisiana–Monroe 14–7)
- (3:52) MRSH – Ethan Payne 1 yard run, Rece Verhoff kick (Drive: 9 plays, 83 yards, 3:25; Tied 14–14)

Third quarter

- No scoring plays

Fourth quarter

- (14:07) ULM – Max Larson 29 yard field goal (Drive: 8 plays, 42 yards, 4:08; Louisiana–Monroe 17–14)
- (13:20) MRSH – Christian Fitzpatrick 33 yard pass from Braylon Braxton, Rece Verhoff kick (Drive: 2 plays, 78 yards, 0:40; Marshall 21–17)
- (3:17) MRSH – Ethan Payne 8 yard run, Rece Verhoff kick (Drive: 6 plays, 48 yards, 3:28; Marshall 28–17)
- (1:48) ULM – Artis Cole 26 yard pass from Aidan Armenta, Aidan Armenta pass failed (Drive: 4 plays, 75 yards, 1:29; Marshall 28–23)

Statistics	ULM	MRSH
First downs	17	20
Plays–yards	58–388	62–364
Rushes–yards	45–239	43–198
Passing yards	149	166
Passing: Comp–Att–Int	9–13–1	10–19–0
Time of possession	32:27	27:33

Team	Category	Player	Statistics
Louisiana–Monroe	Passing	Aidan Armenta	9/13, 149 yards, 2 TD, INT
Louisiana–Monroe	Rushing	Ahmad Hardy	25 carries, 207 yards, TD
Louisiana–Monroe	Receiving	James Jones	2 receptions, 43 yards, TD
Marshall	Passing	Braylon Braxton	10/19, 166 yards, TD
Marshall	Rushing	Jordan Houston	9 carries, 80 yards
Marshall	Receiving	Charles Montgomery	4 receptions, 68 yards

=== Texas State ===
Game Nine – Texas State Bobcats (4–4) at Louisiana–Monroe Warhawks (5–3) – Game summary

Quarter	1	2	3	4	Total
Bobcats	14	14	0	10	38
Warhawks	0	0	14	3	17

at Malone Stadium • Monroe, LA

- Date: Saturday November 9, 2024
- Game time: 11:00 a.m.
- Game weather: Rain • Temperature: 68 °F (20 °C) • Wind: NE 4 miles per hour (6.4 km/h)
- Game attendance: 13,720
- Referee: Marshall Lewis
- TV announcers (ESPNU): Jason Ross Jr. (play-by-play) and Tyoka Jackson (analyst)

Game information

First quarter

- (7:25) TXST – Deion Hankins 3-yard run, Mason Shipley kick (Drive: 9 plays, 76 yards, 3:57; Texas State 7–0)
- (1:55) TXST – Kole Wilson 41-yard pass from Jordan McCloud, Mason Shipley kick (Drive: 1 play, 41 yards, 0:08; Texas State 14–0)

Second quarter

- (12:04) TXST – Jordan McCloud 6-yard run, Mason Shipley kick (Drive: 6 plays, 33 yards, 2:56; Texas State 21–0)
- (0:12) TXST – Brad Jackson 2-yard run, Mason Shipley kick (Drive: 14 plays, 83 yards, 3:52; Texas State 28–0)

Third quarter

- (7:48) ULM – Ahmad Hardy 1-yard run, Max Larson kick (Drive: 13 plays, 75 yards, 7:12; Texas State 28–7)
- (2:38) ULM – Ahmad Hardy 1-yard run, Max Larson kick (Drive: 8 plays, 63 yards, 3:49; Texas State 28–14)

Fourth quarter

- (8:28) TXST – Mason Shipley 32-yard field goal (Drive: 6 plays, 18 yards, 3:27; Texas State 31–14)
- (6:02) ULM – Max Larson 31-yard field goal (Drive: 8 plays, 62 yards, 2:26; Texas State 31–17)
- (0:56) TXST – Brad Jackson 13-yard run, Mason Shipley kick (Drive: 10 plays, 75 yards, 5:05; Texas State 38–17)

Statistics	TXST	ULM
First downs	21	18
Total yards	398	278
Rushing yards	326	159
Passing yards	72	119
Passing: Comp–Att–Int	8–14–0	13–24–1
Time of possession	31:01	28:59

Team	Category	Player	Statistics
Texas State	Passing	Jordan McCloud	4/5, 56 yards, TD
Texas State	Rushing	Brad Jackson	16 carries, 119 yards, 2 TD
Texas State	Receiving	Kole Wilson	3 receptions, 53 yards, TD
Louisiana–Monroe	Passing	Aidan Armenta	13/24, 119 yards, INT
Louisiana–Monroe	Rushing	Ahmad Hardy	20 carries, 105 yards, 2 TD
Louisiana–Monroe	Receiving	Davon Wells	3 receptions, 37 yards

=== at Auburn ===
Game Ten – Louisiana–Monroe Warhawks (5–4) at Auburn Tigers (3–6) – Game summary

Quarter	1	2	3	4	Total
Warhawks	0	0	7	7	14
Tigers	10	14	14	10	48

at Jordan-Hare Stadium • Auburn, AL

- Date: Saturday November 16, 2024
- Game time: 11:45 a.m.
- Game weather: Sunny • Temperature: 61 °F (16 °C) • Wind: S 5 miles per hour (8.0 km/h)
- Game attendance: 88,043
- Referee: Wayne Winkler
- TV announcers (SECN): Taylor Zarzour (play-by-play), Matt Stinchcomb (analyst) and Alyssa Lang (sideline)

Game information

First quarter

- (10:57) AUB – Cam Coleman 20-yard pass from Payton Thorne, Ian Vachon kick (Drive: 8 plays, 60 yards, 2:24; Auburn 7–0)
- (5:21) AUB – Ian Vachon 22-yard field goal (Drive: 8 plays, 50 yards, 2:43; Auburn 10–0)

Second quarter

- (7:44) AUB – Cam Coleman 3-yard pass from Payton Thorne, Ian Vachon kick (Drive: 16 plays, 99 yards, 7:34; Auburn 17–0)
- (0:06) AUB – KeAndre Lambert-Smith 30-yard pass from Payton Thorne, Ian Vachon kick (Drive: 6 plays, 74 yards, 1:19; Auburn 24–0)

Third quarter

- (8:09) ULM – Ahmad Hardy 1-yard run, Max Larson kick (Drive: 8 plays, 76 yards, 5:02; Auburn 24–7)
- (4:37) AUB – Cam Coleman 22-yard pass from Payton Thorne, Ian Vachon kick (Drive: 10 plays, 70 yards, 3:25; Auburn 31–7)
- (1:16) AUB – Malcolm Simmons 40-yard pass from Payton Thorne, Ian Vachon kick (Drive: 3 plays, 62 yards, 1:18; Auburn 38–7)

Fourth quarter

- (11:48) AUB – Damari Alston 7-yard run, Ian Vachon kick (Drive: 3 plays, 12 yards, 0:46; Auburn 45–7)
- (1:48) AUB – Ian Vachon 26-yard field goal (Drive: 12 plays, 56 yards, 6:59; Auburn 48–7)
- (0:08) ULM – Jonathan Bibbs 65-yard pass from General Booty, Max Larson kick (Drive: 3 plays, 75 yards, 1:39; Auburn 48–14)

Statistics	ULM	AUB
First downs	9	26
Total yards	218	507
Rushing yards	64	203
Passing yards	154	304
Passing: Comp–Att–Int	9–16–0	24–37–0
Time of possession	29:17	30:43

Team	Category	Player	Statistics
Louisiana–Monroe	Passing	Aiden Armenta	8/15, 89 yards
Louisiana–Monroe	Rushing	Ahmad Hardy	15 carries, 60 yards, TD
Louisiana–Monroe	Receiving	Jonathan Bibbs	1 reception, 65 yards, TD
Auburn	Passing	Payton Thorne	22/32, 286 yards, 5 TD
Auburn	Rushing	Jarquez Hunter	14 carries, 102 yards
Auburn	Receiving	KeAndre Lambert-Smith	6 receptions, 102 yards

=== at Arkansas State ===
Game Eleven – Louisiana–Monroe Warhawks (5–5) at Arkansas State Red Wolves (6–4) – Game summary

Quarter	1	2	3	4	Total
Warhawks	7	0	7	7	21
Red Wolves	7	7	7	7	28

at Jordan-Hare Stadium • Jonesboro, AR

- Date: Saturday November 23, 2024
- Game time: 2:00 p.m.
- Game weather: Sunny • Temperature: 55 °F (13 °C) • Wind: S 7 miles per hour (11 km/h)
- Game attendance: 14,029
- Referee: Steven Robinson
- TV announcers (ESPN+): Roger Twibell (play-by-play), Pete Cordelli (analyst) and Darrell Greene (sideline)

Game information

First quarter

- (12:27) ULM – Jake Godfrey 26-yard pass from Aidan Armenta, Max Larson kick (Drive: 5 plays, 75 yards, 2:33; Louisiana–Monroe 7–0)
- (6:50) ARST – Zak Wallace 2-yard run, Clune Van Andel kick (Drive: 14 plays, 74 yards, 5:32; Tied 7–7)

Second quarter

- (7:52) ARST – Corey Rucker 32-yard pass from Jaylen Raynor, Clune Van Andel kick (Drive: 9 plays, 53 yards, 3:24; Arkansas State 14–7)

Third quarter

- (11:59) ULM – Ahmad Hardy 72-yard run, Max Larson kick (Drive: 2 plays, 65 yards, 1:01; Tied 14–14)
- (0:40) ARST – Hunter Summers 12-yard pass from Jaylen Raynor, Clune Van Andel kick (Drive: 14 plays, 69 yards, 6:26; Arkansas State 21–14)

Fourth quarter

- (9:15) ULM – Ahmad Hardy 1-yard run, Max Larson kick (Drive: 10 plays, 70 yards, 6:25; Tied 21–21)
- (7:58) ARST – Courtney Jackson 44-yard pass from Jaylen Raynor, Clune Van Andel kick (Drive: 3 plays, 61 yards, 1:12; Arkansas State 28–21)

Statistics	ULM	ARST
First downs	19	21
Total yards	393	357
Rushing yards	256	187
Passing yards	137	170
Passing: Comp–Att–Int	11–22–1	18–26–0
Time of possession	31:19	28:41

Team	Category	Player	Statistics
Louisiana–Monroe	Passing	Aidan Armenta	11/22, 137 yards, TD, INT
Louisiana–Monroe	Rushing	Ahmad Hardy	30 carries, 204 yards, 2 TD
Louisiana–Monroe	Receiving	Jake Godfrey	5 receptions, 58 yards, TD
Arkansas State	Passing	Jaylen Raynor	18/26, 170 yards, 3 TD
Arkansas State	Rushing	Zak Wallace	18 carries, 130 yards, TD
Arkansas State	Receiving	Courtney Jackson	6 receptions, 69 yards, TD

=== Louisiana (Battle on the Bayou) ===
Game Twelve – Louisiana Ragin' Cajuns (9–2) at Louisiana–Monroe Warhawks (5–6) – Game summary

Quarter	1	2	3	4	Total
Ragin' Cajuns	6	7	7	17	37
Warhawks	3	10	3	7	23

at Malone Stadium • Monroe, LA

- Date: Saturday November 30, 2024
- Game time: 11:00 a.m.
- Game weather: Sunny • Temperature: 49 °F (9 °C) • Wind: SE 8 mph
- Referee: Scott Broadway
- TV announcers (ESPNU): Courtney Lyle (play-by-play) and Rene Ingoglia (analyst)

Game information

First quarter

- (7:26) ULM – Max Larson 25-yard field goal (Drive: 8 plays, 35 yards, 3:42; Louisiana–Monroe 3–0)
- (2:14) LA – Zylan Perry 1-yard run, Kenneth Almendares PAT blocked (Drive: 6 plays, 27 yards, 1:44; Louisiana 6–3)

Second quarter

- (10:23) ULM – Tyler Griffin 7-yard pass from Aidan Armenta, Max Larson kick (Drive: 11 plays, 88 yards, 5:36; Louisiana–Monroe 10–6)
- (4:03) LA – Lance LeGendre 6-yard pass from Chandler Fields, Kenneth Almendares kick (Drive: 11 plays, 88 yards, 5:36; Louisiana 13–10)
- (0:19) ULM – Max Larson 47-yard field goal (Drive: 11 plays, 48 yards, 3:41; TIE 13–13)

Third quarter

- (11:09) LA – Tavion Smith 4-yard pass from Chandler Fields, Kenneth Almendares kick (Drive: 7 plays, 80 yards, 3:46; Louisiana 20–13)
- (2:32) ULM – Max Larson 29-yard field goal (Drive: 15 plays, 64 yards, 8:37; Louisiana 20–16)

Fourth quarter

- (11:30) LA – Zylan Perry 7-yard run, Kenneth Almendares kick (Drive: 13 plays, 65 yards, 5:54; Louisiana 27–16)
- (6:07) LA – Kenneth Almendares 26-yard field goal (Drive: 8 plays, 41 yards, 3:55; Louisiana 30–16)
- (3:52) ULM – Ahmad Hardy 8-yard run, Max Larson kick (Drive: 7 plays, 75 yards, 2:15; Louisiana 30–23)
- (1:05) LA – Bill Davis 24-yard run, Kenneth Almendares kick (Drive: 8 plays, 75 yards, 2:47; Louisiana 37–23)

Statistics	LA	ULM
First downs	21	20
Total yards	411	335
Rushing yards	223	167
Passing yards	188	168
Passing: Comp–Att–Int	17-26-1	15-31-3
Time of possession	31:00	29:00

Team	Category	Player	Statistics
Louisiana	Passing	Chandler Fields	17/26, 188 yards, 2 TDs, 1 INT
Louisiana	Rushing	Zylan Perry	19 carries, 150 yards, 2 TDs
Louisiana	Receiving	Jacob Bernard	3 receptions, 42 yards
Louisiana–Monroe	Passing	Aidan Armenta	15/31, 168 yards, 1 TD, 3 INTs
Louisiana–Monroe	Rushing	Ahmad Hardy	28 carries, 172 yards, 1 TD
Louisiana–Monroe	Receiving	Nate Sullivan Jr.	2 receptions, 39 yards
