= 2024 Sun Belt Conference football season =

- League: NCAA Division I Football Bowl Subdivision
- Sport: Football
- Duration: August 31, 2024 – December 7, 2024
- Teams: 14

2025 NFL draft
- Top draft pick: DE Mike Green, Marshall
- Picked by: Baltimore Ravens, 59th overall

Regular season
- Season MVP: DE Mike Green, Marshall
- East champions: Marshall
- West champions: Louisiana

SBC Championship Game
- Date: December 7, 2024
- Venue: Cajun Field, Lafayette, Louisiana
- Champions: Marshall
- Runners-up: Louisiana
- Finals MVP: QB Braylon Braxton, Marshall

Seasons
- ← 2023 2025 →

2024 Sun Belt Conference football standings
	Conf.			Overall
Team	W		L	W		L
East Division
Marshall xy$	7	–	1	10	–	3
Georgia Southern	6	–	2	8	–	5
James Madison	4	–	4	9	–	4
Old Dominion	4	–	4	5	–	7
Coastal Carolina	3	–	5	6	–	7
Appalachian State	3	–	5	5	–	6
Georgia State	1	–	7	3	–	9
West Division
Louisiana xy	7	–	1	10	–	4
Texas State	5	–	3	8	–	5
Arkansas State	5	–	3	8	–	5
South Alabama	5	–	3	7	–	6
Louisiana–Monroe	3	–	5	5	–	7
Troy	3	–	5	4	–	8
Southern Miss	0	–	8	1	–	11
Championship: Marshall 31, Louisiana 3
$ – Conference champion; x – Division champion/co-champions; y – Championship game participant

The 2024 Sun Belt Conference football season was the 24th season of college football play for the Sun Belt Conference (SBC). The season began on August 31, 2024, and concluded with the Conference Championship Game on December 7, 2024. The season was part of the 2024 NCAA Division I FBS football season. The conference consisted of 14 football member split into two divisions. The conference released its full season schedule on March 1, 2024.

== Preseason ==
=== Preseason Media Poll ===
The SBC released its preseason poll on July 22. Appalachian State was named the favorite to win the East Division, while Texas State was named the favorite to win the West Division.

East
Predicted finish	Team	Votes (1st place)
1	Appalachian State	96 (12)
2	James Madison	79 (2)
3	Coastal Carolina	67
4	Georgia Southern	50
5	Marshall	49
6	Old Dominion	32
7	Georgia State	19

West
Predicted finish	Team	Votes (1st place)
1	Texas State	92 (9)
2	Troy	68 (4)
3	Louisiana	66 (1)
4	Arkansas State	65
5	South Alabama	54
6	Southern Miss	31
7	Louisiana–Monroe	16

=== Preseason All-Conference teams ===
- Offensive Player of the Year: Joey Aguilar (Senior, Appalachian State quarterback)
- Defensive Player of the Year: Jason Henderson (Senior, Old Dominion, linebacker)

Position	Player	Team
First Team Offense
QB	Joey Aguilar	Appalachian State
QB	Jordan McCloud	Texas State
RB	Jalen White	Georgia Southern
RB	Ismail Mahdi	Texas State
OL	Jacob Bayer	Arkansas State
OL	Makilan Thomas	Arkansas State
OL	Cole Potts	James Madison
OL	A. J. Gillie	Georgia Southern
OL	Daniel King	Troy
TE	Eli Wilson	Appalachian State
WR	Kaedin Robinson	Appalachian State
WR	Derwin Burgess Jr	Georgia Southern
WR	Joey Hobert	Texas State
First Team Defense
DL	Santana Hopper	Appalachian State
DL	Nate Martey	Arkansas State
DL	Justin Rhodes	Georgia Southern
DL	Isaac Walker	Georgia Southern
LB	Nate Johnson	Appalachian State
LB	Marques Watson-Trent	Georgia Southern
LB	Jason Henderson	Old Dominion
LB	Ben Bell	Texas State
DB	Jordan Favors	Appalachian State
DB	Ethan Johnson	Appalachian State
DB	Gavin Pringle	Georgia Southern
DB	Jaden Voisin	South Alabama
First Team Special Teams
K	Mason Shipley	Texas State
P	Ryan Hanson	James Madison
RS	Zylan Perry	Louisiana
AP	Ismail Mahdi	Texas State

Position	Player	Team
Second Team Offense
QB	Jaylen Raynor	Arkansas State
RB	Kanye Roberts	Appalachian State
RB	Ja'Quez Cross	Arkansas State
OL	Chandler Strong	Georgia Southern
OL	Pichon Wimbley	Georgia Southern
OL	Tyshawn Wyatt	James Madison
OL	Logan Osburn	Marshall
OL	Eli Russ	Troy
TE	Kendall Karr	Coastal Carolina
WR	Courtney Jackson	Arkansas State
WR	Corey Rucker	Arkansas State
WR	Jamaal Pritchett	South Alabama
WR	Kole Wilson	Texas State
Second Team Defense
DL	Will Whitson	Coastal Carolina
DL	Eric O'Neill	James Madison
DL	Jordan Lawson	Louisiana
DL	Denzel Lowry	Old Domimion
DL	Wy'Kevious Thomas	South Alabama
LB	Charles Willekes	Arkansas State
LB	Kevin Swint	Georgia Southern
LB	Jordan Veneziale	Georgia State
LB	KC Ossai	Louisiana
DB	T. J. Smith	Georgia Southern
DB	Chauncey Logan	James Madison
DB	Tyrone Lewis Jr.	Louisiana
DB	Kaleb Culp	Texas State
Second Team Special Teams
K	Michael Hughes	Appalachian State
P	Robert Cole	Troy
RS	DeAndre Buchanan	Georgia Southern
AP	Ja'Quez Cross	Arkansas State

== Head coaches ==
- On November 26, 2023, Louisiana–Monroe announced that it had fired head coach Terry Bowden after 3 seasons with the team. On December 5, 2023, the school announced that former UAB head coach Bryant Vincent would take over as the new head coach for 2024.
- On November 30, 2023, James Madison head coach Curt Cignetti announced that he would leave the school to take the head coach position at Indiana for the 2024 season. Assistant head coach and offensive line coach Damian Wroblewski was named the acting head coach for James Madison's bowl game. On December 7, 2023, the school announced that Bob Chesney would become the new head coach for 2024. Chesney had previously been head coach at Holy Cross.
- On December 8. 2023, Troy head coach Jon Sumrall was announced as the new head coach of Tulane in the American Athletic Conference for the 2024 season. The school's defensive coordinator Greg Gasparato was named the interim head coach. On December 18, 2023, Troy announced Gerad Parker as the new head coach for 2024. Parker was previously the offensive coordinator at Notre Dame.
- On January 15, South Alabama head coach Kane Wommack was hired as the defensive coordinator at Alabama. South Alabama promoted their offensive coordinator Major Applewhite to the head coach position to replace Wommack.
- On February 15, Georgia State head coach Shawn Elliott resigned from his position to join South Carolina as a Tight Ends coach On February 23, Georgia State named Dell McGee as the new head coach. McGee had previously been the running backs coach at Georgia.

Team	Head coach	Previous job	Years at school	Overall record	Sun Belt record	Sun Belt titles
Appalachian State	Shawn Clark	Appalachian State (OL coach)	5	35–18 (.660)	22–10 (.688)	0
Arkansas State	Butch Jones	Alabama (assistant coach)	4	95–80 (.543)	6–18 (.250)	0
Coastal Carolina	Tim Beck	NC State (offensive coordinator)	2	8–5 (.615)	5–3 (.625)	0
Georgia Southern	Clay Helton	USC (head coach)	3	58–38 (.604)	6–10 (.375)	0
Georgia State	Dell McGee	Georgia (RB coach/run game coordinator)	1	1–0 (1.000)	1–0 (1.000)	0
James Madison	Bob Chesney	Holy Cross (head coach)	1	111–46 (.707)	0–0 (–)	0
Louisiana	Michael Desormeaux	Louisiana (co-offensive coordinator)	3	13–14 (.481)	7–9 (.438)	0
Louisiana–Monroe	Bryant Vincent	New Mexico (offensive coordinator)	1	7–6 (.538)	0–0 (–)	0
Marshall	Charles Huff	Alabama (associate head coach)	4	22–17 (.564)	8–8 (.500)	0
Old Dominion	Ricky Rahne	Penn State (offensive coordinator)	5	15–23 (.395)	7–9 (.438)	0
South Alabama	Major Applewhite	South Alabama (offensive coordinator)	1	15–11 (.577)	0–0 (–)	0
Southern Miss	Will Hall	Tulane (offensive coordinator)	4	69–44 (.611)	6–10 (.375)	0
Texas State	G. J. Kinne	Incarnate Word (head coach)	2	20–7 (.741)	4–4 (.500)	0
Troy	Gerad Parker	Notre Dame (offensive coordinator)	1	0–6 (.000)	0–0 (–)	0

=== Mid-season changes ===
- On October 20, Southern Miss announced that they had fired head coach Will Hall after starting the season with a 1–6 record. Assistant head coach Reed Stringer was named the interim head coach. On December 8, Southern Miss announced that they had hired Charles Huff away from Marshall to be their head coach in 2025. Marshall's associate head coach Telly Lockette was named the interim head coach for Marshall's bowl game.

=== Post-season changes ===
- On December 2, Appalachian State announced that they had fired head coach Shawn Clark. On December 7, Appalachian State announced Dowell Loggains as the new head coach. Loggains had previously been the offensive coordinator at South Carolina.
- On December 8, Marshall announced Tony Gibson as their new head coach for the 2025 season. Gibson had previously the defensive coordinator at NC State.

== Rankings ==
		Pre	Wk 1	Wk 2	Wk 3	Wk 4	Wk 5	Wk 6	Wk 7	Wk 8	Wk 9	Wk 10	Wk 11	Wk 12	Wk 13	Wk 14	Wk 15	Final
Appalachian State	AP	RV	RV															
Appalachian State	C	RV	RV															
Appalachian State	CFP	Not released																
Arkansas State	AP																	
Arkansas State	C																	
Arkansas State	CFP	Not released																
Coastal Carolina	AP																	
Coastal Carolina	C		RV															
Coastal Carolina	CFP	Not released																
Georgia Southern	AP																	
Georgia Southern	C																	
Georgia Southern	CFP	Not released																
Georgia State	AP																	
Georgia State	C																	
Georgia State	CFP	Not released																
James Madison	AP						RV	RV						RV				
James Madison	C	RV	RV	RV	RV	RV	RV	RV	RV		RV	RV	RV	RV	RV			
James Madison	CFP	Not released																
Louisiana	AP										RV	RV	RV	RV	RV	RV	RV	
Louisiana	C										RV	RV	RV	RV	RV	RV	RV	
Louisiana	CFP	Not released																
Louisiana–Monroe	AP																	
Louisiana–Monroe	C																	
Louisiana–Monroe	CFP	Not released																
Marshall	AP																RV	RV
Marshall	C																RV	RV
Marshall	CFP	Not released																
Old Dominion	AP																	
Old Dominion	C																	
Old Dominion	CFP	Not released																
South Alabama	AP																	
South Alabama	C																	
South Alabama	CFP	Not released																
Southern Miss	AP																	
Southern Miss	C																	
Southern Miss	CFP	Not released																
Texas State	AP																	
Texas State	C	RV	RV	RV														
Texas State	CFP	Not released																
Troy	AP																	
Troy	C	RV																
Troy	CFP	Not released																

Legend
	Improvement in ranking
	Drop in ranking
	Not ranked previous week
	No change in ranking from previous week
RV	Received votes but were not ranked in Top 25 of poll
т	Tied with team above or below also with this symbol

== Schedule ==
The 2024 schedule was released on March 1, 2024

Index to colors and formatting
Sun Belt member won
Sun Belt member lost
Sun Belt teams in **bold**

=== Week 1 ===
Date	Time	Visiting team	Home team	Site	TV	Result	Attendance	Ref.
August 29	7:00 p.m.	**Coastal Carolina**	Jacksonville State	AmFirst Stadium • Jacksonville, AL	CBSSN	**W** 55–27	18,977	
August 29	8:00 p.m.	Jackson State	**Louisiana–Monroe**	JPS Field at Malone Stadium • Monroe, LA	ESPN+	**W** 30–14	11,145	
August 31	2:30 p.m.	East Tennessee State	**Appalachian State**	Kidd Brewer Stadium • Boone, NC	ESPN+	**W** 38–10	36,232	
August 31	3:00 p.m.	Boise State	**Georgia Southern**	Paulson Stadium • Statesboro, GA	ESPNU	**L** 45–56	24,134	
August 31	3:15 p.m.	**Old Dominion**	South Carolina	Williams–Brice Stadium • Columbia, SC	SECN	**L** 19–23	78,496	
August 31	4:00 p.m.	Stony Brook	**Marshall**	Joan C. Edwards Stadium • Huntington, WV	ESPN+	**W** 45–3	25,032	
August 31	4:00 p.m.	North Texas	**South Alabama**	Hancock Whitney Stadium • Mobile, AL	ESPN+	**L** 38–52	15,559	
August 31	6:00 p.m.	No. 11 (FCS) Central Arkansas	**Arkansas State**	Centennial Bank Stadium • Jonesboro, AR	ESPN+	**W** 34–31	21,708	
August 31	6:00 p.m.	Nevada	**Troy**	Veterans Memorial Stadium • Troy, AL	ESPN+	**L** 26–28	27,412	
August 31	6:45 p.m.	**Southern Miss**	Kentucky	Kroger Field • Lexington, KY	SECN	**L** 0–31	61,627	
August 31	7:00 p.m.	**Georgia State**	Georgia Tech	Bobby Dodd Stadium • Atlanta, GA	ACCN	**L** 12–35	40,113	
August 31	7:00 p.m.	**James Madison**	Charlotte	Jerry Richardson Stadium • Charlotte, NC	ESPNU	**W** 30–7	15,314	
August 31	7:00 p.m.	Grambling State	**Louisiana**	Cajun Field • Lafayette, LA	ESPN+	**W** 40–10	23,107	
August 31	7:00 p.m.	Lamar	**Texas State**	Bobcat Stadium • San Marcos, TX	ESPN+	**W** 34–27	19,637	
^{#}Rankings from AP Poll released prior to game. All times are in Central Time.

=== Week 2 ===
Date	Time	Visiting team	Home team	Site	TV	Result	Attendance	Ref.
September 7	11:00 a.m.	**Troy**	Memphis	Simmons Bank Liberty Stadium • Memphis, TN	ESPNU	**L** 17–38	23,246	
September 7	3:00 p.m.	UTSA	**Texas State**	Bobcat Stadium • San Marcos, TX (I-35 Rivalry)	ESPNU	**W** 49–10	28,000	
September 7	3:30 p.m.	**Marshall**	Virginia Tech	Lane Stadium • Blacksburg, VA	The CW	**L** 14–31	65,632	
September 7	5:00 p.m.	Gardner–Webb	**James Madison**	Bridgeforth Stadium • Harrisonburg, VA	ESPN+	**W** 13–6	24,570	
September 7	5:00 p.m.	East Carolina	**Old Dominion**	S.B. Ballard Stadium • Norfolk, VA	ESPN+	**L** 14–20	21,944	
September 7	5:00 p.m.	**South Alabama**	Ohio	Peden Stadium • Athens, OH	ESPN+	**L** 20–27	22,158	
September 7	6:00 p.m.	Tulsa	**Arkansas State**	Centennial Bank Stadium • Jonesboro, AR	ESPN+	**W** 28–24	19,316	
September 7	6:00 p.m.	No. 13 (FCS) William & Mary	**Coastal Carolina**	Brooks Stadium • Conway, SC	ESPN+	**W** 40–21	19,294	
September 7	6:00 p.m.	**Georgia Southern**	Nevada	Mackay Stadium • Reno, NV	TruTV	**W** 20–17	16,245	
September 7	6:00 p.m.	No. 11 (FCS) Chattanooga	**Georgia State**	Center Parc Stadium • Atlanta, GA	ESPN+	**W** 24–21	0	
September 7	6:00 p.m.	**Louisiana**	Kennesaw State	Fifth Third Bank Stadium • Kennesaw, GA	ESPN+	**W** 34–10	11,040	
September 7	6:00 p.m.	UAB	**Louisiana–Monroe**	JPS Field at Malone Stadium • Monroe, LA	ESPN+	**W** 32–6	12,327	
September 7	6:00 p.m.	Southeastern Louisiana	**Southern Miss**	M. M. Roberts Stadium • Hattiesburg, MS	ESPN+	**W** 35–10	22,044	
September 7	7:00 p.m.	**Appalachian State**	No. 25 Clemson	Memorial Stadium • Clemson, SC	ACCN	**L** 20–66	81,500	
^{#}Rankings from AP Poll released prior to game. All times are in Central Time.

=== Week 3 ===
Date	Time	Visiting team	Home team	Site	TV	Result	Attendance	Ref.
September 12	6:30 p.m.	Northwestern State	**South Alabama**	Hancock Whitney Stadium • Mobile, AL	ESPN+	**W** 87–10	16,023	
September 12	6:30 p.m.	Arizona State	**Texas State**	Bobcat Stadium • San Marcos, TX	ESPN	**L** 28–31	25,187	
September 14	11:00 a.m.	**Arkansas State**	No. 17 Michigan	Michigan Stadium • Ann Arbor, MI	BTN	**L** 18–28	110,250	
September 14	1:00 p.m.	**Coastal Carolina**	Temple	Lincoln Financial Field • Philadelphia, PA	ESPN+	**W** 28–20	13,945	
September 14	3:00 p.m.	**Appalachian State**	East Carolina	Dowdy–Ficklen Stadium • Greenville, NC	ESPNU	**W** 21–19	46,117	
September 14	3:00 p.m.	**Troy**	Iowa	Kinnick Stadium • Iowa City, IA	FS1	**L** 21–38	69,250	
September 14	5:00 p.m.	South Carolina State	**Georgia Southern**	Paulson Stadium • Stateboro, GA	ESPN+	**W** 42–14	21,617	
September 14	5:00 p.m.	Virginia Tech	**Old Dominion**	S.B. Ballard Stadium • Norfolk, VA	ESPN+	**L** 17–37	22,208	
September 14	6:00 p.m.	Vanderbilt	**Georgia State**	Center Parc Stadium • Atlanta, GA	ESPN+	**W** 36–32	14,413	
September 14	6:00 p.m.	South Florida	**Southern Miss**	M. M. Roberts Stadium • Hattiesburg, MS	ESPN+	**L** 24–49	28,146	
^{#}Rankings from AP Poll released prior to game. All times are in Central Time.

=== Week 4 ===
Date	Time	Visiting team	Home team	Site	TV	Result	Attendance	Ref.
September 19	6:30 p.m.	**South Alabama**	**Appalachian State**	Kidd Brewer Stadium • Boone, NC	ESPN	**SOAL** 48–14	34,133	
September 21	11:00 a.m.	**Marshall**	No. 3 Ohio State	Ohio Stadium • Columbus, OH	FOX	**L** 14–49	103,871	
September 21	11:00 a.m.	**James Madison**	North Carolina	Kenan Memorial Stadium • Chapel Hill, NC	ACCN	**W** 70–50	50,500	
September 21	11:00 a.m.	Tulane	**Louisiana**	Cajun Field • Lafayette, LA	ESPNU	**L** 33–41	22,534	
September 21	1:00 p.m.	Virginia	**Coastal Carolina**	Brooks Stadium • Conway, SC	ESPN+	**L** 24–43	22,104	
September 21	1:00 p.m.	**Arkansas State**	No. 20 Iowa State	Jack Trice Stadium • Ames, IA	ESPN+	**L** 7–52	55,428	
September 21	2:00 p.m.	**Southern Miss**	Jacksonville State	AmFirst Stadium • Jacksonville, AL	ESPN+	**L** 7–44	21,788	
September 21	6:00 p.m.	Florida A&M	**Troy**	Veterans Memorial Stadium • Troy, AL	ESPN+	**W** 34–12	29,024	
September 21	6:45 p.m.	**Georgia Southern**	No. 5 Ole Miss	Vaught–Hemingway Stadium • University, MS	SECN	**L** 13–52	67,505	
September 21	7:00 p.m.	**Louisiana–Monroe**	No. 1 Texas	Darrell K Royal–Texas Memorial Stadium • Austin, TX	ESPN+	**L** 3–51	102,850	
^{#}Rankings from AP Poll released prior to game. All times are in Central Time.

=== Week 5 ===
Date	Time	Visiting team	Home team	Site	TV	Result	Attendance	Ref.
September 28	12:30 p.m.	Ball State	**James Madison**	Bridgeforth Stadium • Harrisonburg, VA	ESPN+	**W** 63–7	25,786	
September 28	2:00 p.m.	**Texas State**	Sam Houston	NRG Stadium • Houston, TX	ESPN+	**L** 39–40	27,225	
September 28	2:30 p.m.	**Louisiana**	Wake Forest	Allegacy Federal Credit Union Stadium • Winston-Salem, NC	ACCN	**W** 41–38	31,061	
September 28	2:30 p.m.	Liberty	**Appalachian State**	Kidd Brewer Stadium • Boone, NC	ESPN+	Canceled	N/A	
September 28	2:30 p.m.	**Georgia Southern**	**Georgia State**	Center Parc Stadium • Atlanta, GA (rivalry)	ESPNU	**GASO** 38–21	18,808	
September 28	2:30 p.m.	Western Michigan	**Marshall**	Joan C. Edwards Stadium • Huntington, WV	ESPN+	**W** 27–20	18,723	
September 28	4:00 p.m.	**Old Dominion**	Bowling Green	Doyt Perry Stadium • Bowling Green, OH	ESPN+	**W** 30–27	19,140	
September 28	6:00 p.m.	**Louisiana–Monroe**	**Troy**	Veterans Memorial Stadium • Troy, AL	ESPN+	**ULM** 13–9	21,253	
September 28	6:45 p.m.	**South Alabama**	No. 14 LSU	Tiger Stadium • Baton Rouge, LA	SECN	**L** 10–42	102,143	
^{#}Rankings from AP Poll released prior to game. All times are in Central Time.

=== Week 6 ===
Date	Time	Visiting team	Home team	Site	TV	Result	Attendance	Ref.
October 3	6:00 p.m.	Texas State	Troy	Veterans Memorial Stadium • Troy, AL	ESPN2	**TXST** 38–17	20,349	
October 5	2:30 p.m.	Appalachian State	Marshall	Joan C. Edwards Stadium • Huntington, WV (rivalry)	ESPN+	**MU** 52–37	28,023	
October 5	6:00 p.m.	James Madison	Louisiana–Monroe	JPS Field at Malone Stadium • Monroe, LA	ESPNU	**ULM** 21–19	19,976	
October 5	6:00 p.m.	Old Dominion	Coastal Carolina	Brooks Stadium • Conway, SC	ESPN+	**CCU** 45–37	18,552	
October 5	6:00 p.m.	South Alabama	Arkansas State	Centennial Bank Stadium • Jonesboro, AR	ESPN+	**ARKST** 18–16	21,427	
October 5	6:00 p.m.	Louisiana	Southern Miss	M. M. Roberts Stadium • Hattiesburg, MS	ESPN+	**ULL** 23–13	24,041	
^{#}Rankings from AP Poll released prior to game. All times are in Central Time.

=== Week 7 ===
Date	Time	Visiting team	Home team	Site	TV	Result	Attendance	Ref.
October 10	6:30 p.m.	Coastal Carolina	James Madison	Bridgeforth Stadium • Harrisonburg, VA	ESPN2	**JMU** 39–7	25,622	
October 12	2:30 p.m.	Old Dominion	Georgia State	Center Parc Stadium • Atlanta, GA	ESPN+	**ODU** 21–14	12,280	
October 12	4:00 p.m.	Southern Miss	Louisiana–Monroe	JPS Field at Malone Stadium • Monroe, LA	ESPN+	**ULM** 38–21	22,645	
October 12	6:00 p.m.	Arkansas State	Texas State	Bobcat Stadium • San Marcos, TX	ESPN+	**TXST** 41–9	28,000	
October 12	6:30 p.m.	Appalachian State	Louisiana	Cajun Field • Lafayette, LA	ESPN+	**ULL** 34–24	14,058	
October 12	7:00 p.m.	Marshall	Georgia Southern	Paulson Stadium • Statesboro, GA	ESPNU	**GASO** 24–23	24,048	
^{#}Rankings from AP Poll released prior to game. All times are in Central Time.

=== Week 8 ===
Date	Time	Visiting team	Home team	Site	TV	Result	Attendance	Ref.
October 15	6:30 p.m.	Troy	South Alabama	Hancock Whitney Stadium • Mobile, AL (rivalry)	ESPN2	**SOAL** 25–9	25,450	
October 17	6:00 p.m.	Georgia State	Marshall	Joan C. Edwards Stadium • Huntington, WV	ESPN2	**MU** 35–20	20,703	
October 19	11:00 a.m.	Louisiana	Coastal Carolina	Brooks Stadium • Conway, SC	ESPNU	**ULL** 34–24	17,812	
October 19	2:30 p.m.	Texas State	Old Dominion	S.B. Ballard Stadium • Norfolk, VA	ESPN+	**ODU** 24–14	19,129	
October 19	3:00 p.m.	James Madison	Georgia Southern	Paulson Stadium • Statesboro, GA	ESPN+	**GASO** 28–14	20,153	
October 19	6:00 p.m.	Arkansas State	Southern Miss	M. M. Roberts Stadium • Hattiesburg, MS	ESPN+	**ARKST** 44–28	24,542	
^{#}Rankings from AP Poll released prior to game. All times are in Central Time.

=== Week 9 ===
Date	Time	Visiting team	Home team	Site	TV	Result	Attendance	Ref.
October 24	6:00 p.m.	**Georgia Southern**	**Old Dominion**	S.B. Ballard Stadium • Norfolk, VA	ESPN2	**ODU** 47–19	18,281	
October 26	12:00 p.m.	**Georgia State**	**Appalachian State**	Kidd Brewer Stadium • Boone, NC	ESPN+	**APPST** 33–26	33,783	
October 26	2:30 p.m.	**Southern Miss**	**James Madison**	Bridgeforth Stadium • Harrisonburg, VA	ESPN+	**JMU** 32–15	25,399	
October 26	4:00 p.m.	**Louisiana–Monroe**	**South Alabama**	Hancock Whitney Stadium • Mobile, AL	ESPN+	**SOAL** 46–17	16,746	
October 26	6:00 p.m.	**Troy**	**Arkansas State**	Centennial Bank Stadium • Jonesboro, AR	ESPN+	**ARKST** 34–31	17,162	
^{#}Rankings from AP Poll released prior to game. All times are in Central Time.

=== Week 10 ===
Date	Time	Visiting team	Home team	Site	TV	Result	Attendance	Ref.
October 29	6:30 p.m.	Louisiana	**Texas State**	Bobcat Stadium • San Marcos, TX	ESPN2	**ULL** 23–17	16,831	
November 1	6:00 p.m.	Georgia State	UConn	Rentschler Field • East Hartford, CT	CBSSN	**L** 27–34	22,028	
November 2	1:30 p.m.	Old Dominion	**Appalachian State**	Kidd Brewer Stadium • Boone, NC	ESPN+	**APPST** 28–20	34,954	
November 2	2:30 p.m.	Louisiana–Monroe	**Marshall**	Joan C. Edwards Stadium • Huntington, WV	ESPN+	**MU** 28–23	21,478	
November 2	3:00 p.m.	Coastal Carolina	**Troy**	Veterans Memorial Stadium • Troy, AL	ESPN+	**TROY** 38–24	24,223	
November 2	6:30 p.m.	Georgia Southern	**South Alabama**	Hancock Whitney Stadium • Mobile, AL	ESPNU	**GASO** 34–30	19,667	
^{#}Rankings from AP Poll released prior to game. All times are in Central Time.

=== Week 11 ===
Date	Time	Visiting team	Home team	Site	TV	Result	Attendance	Ref.
November 7	7:00 p.m.	**Appalachian State**	**Coastal Carolina**	Brooks Stadium • Conway, SC	ESPN	**CCU** 38–24	19,415	
November 9	11:00 a.m.	**Texas State**	**Louisiana–Monroe**	JPS Field at Malone Stadium • Monroe, LA	ESPNU	**TXST** 38–17	13,720	
November 9	2:00 p.m.	**Marshall**	**Southern Miss**	M. M. Roberts Stadium • Hattiesburg, MS	ESPN+	**MU** 37–3	20,502	
November 9	2:30 p.m.	**Georgia State**	**James Madison**	Bridgeforth Stadium • Harrisonburg, VA	ESPN+	**JMU** 38–7	25,709	
November 9	4:00 p.m.	**Arkansas State**	**Louisiana**	Cajun Field • Lafayette, LA	ESPN+	**ULL** 55–19	16,451	
^{#}Rankings from AP Poll released prior to game. All times are in Central Time.

=== Week 12 ===
Date	Time	Visiting team	Home team	Site	TV	Result	Attendance	Ref.
November 16	11:45 a.m.	Louisiana–Monroe	Auburn	Jordan–Hare Stadium • Auburn, AL	SECN	**L** 14–48	88,043	
November 16	12:00 p.m.	Coastal Carolina	**Marshall**	Joan C. Edwards Stadium • Huntington, WV	ESPN+	**MU** 31–19	24,175	
November 16	3:00 p.m.	Troy	**Georgia Southern**	Paulson Stadium • Statesboro, GA	ESPN+	**TROY** 28–20	21,762	
November 16	3:00 p.m.	James Madison	**Old Dominion**	S.B. Ballard Stadium • Norfolk, VA (Royal Rivalry)	ESPNU	**JMU** 35–32	21,984	
November 16	4:00 p.m.	Arkansas State	**Georgia State**	Center Parc Stadium • Atlanta, GA	ESPN+	**ARKST** 27–20	14,047	
November 16	6:00 p.m.	South Alabama	**Louisiana**	Cajun Field • Lafayette, LA	ESPN+	**SOAL** 24–22	16,063	
November 16	6:00 p.m.	Southern Miss	**Texas State**	Bobcat Stadium • San Marcos, TX	ESPN+	**TXST** 58–3	22,618	
^{#}Rankings from AP Poll released prior to game. All times are in Central Time.

=== Week 13 ===
Date	Time	Visiting team	Home team	Site	TV	Result	Attendance	Ref.
November 23	1:30 p.m.	James Madison	Appalachian State	Kidd Brewer Stadium • Boone, NC	ESPN+	**APPST** 34–20	34,012	
November 23	2:00 p.m.	Louisiana–Monroe	Arkansas State	Centennial Bank Stadium • Jonesboro, AR	ESPN+	**ARKST** 28–21	14,029	
November 23	2:00 p.m.	South Alabama	Southern Miss	M. M. Roberts Stadium • Hattiesburg, MS	ESPN+	**SOAL** 35–14	20,074	
November 23	2:30 p.m.	Georgia Southern	Coastal Carolina	Brooks Stadium • Conway, SC	ESPN+	**GASO** 26–6	14,556	
November 23	4:00 p.m.	Troy	Louisiana	Cajun Field • Lafayette, LA	ESPN+	**ULL** 51–30	15,501	
November 23	6:00 p.m.	Georgia State	Texas State	Bobcat Stadium • San Marcos, TX	ESPN+	**GSU** 52–44	18,271	
November 23	6:30 p.m.	Marshall	Old Dominion	S.B. Ballard Stadium • Norfolk, VA	ESPNU	**MU** 42–35	18,083	
^{#}Rankings from AP Poll released prior to game. All times are in Central Time.

=== Week 14 ===
Date	Time	Visiting team	Home team	Site	TV	Result	Attendance	Ref.
November 29	2:30 p.m.	Texas State	South Alabama	Hancock Whitney Stadium • Mobile, AL	ESPN+	**TXST** 45–38	15,569	
November 30	11:00 a.m.	Louisiana	Louisiana–Monroe	JPS Field at Malone Stadium • Monroe, LA (Battle on the Bayou)	ESPNU	**ULL** 37–23	15,006	
November 30	1:00 p.m.	Coastal Carolina	Georgia State	Center Parc Stadium • Atlanta, GA	ESPN+	**CCU** 48–27	12,606	
November 30	1:00 p.m.	Southern Miss	Troy	Veterans Memorial Stadium • Troy, AL	ESPN+	**TROY** 52–20	19,521	
November 30	2:00 p.m.	Old Dominion	Arkansas State	Centennial Bank Stadium • Jonesboro, AR	ESPN+	**ODU** 40–32	13,584	
November 30	5:00 p.m.	Appalachian State	Georgia Southern	Paulson Stadium • Statesboro, GA (rivalry)	ESPN+	**GASO** 29–20	23,383	
November 30	7:00 p.m.	Marshall	James Madison	Bridgeforth Stadium • Harrisonburg, VA	ESPNU	**MU** 35–33 ^{2OT}	23,341	
^{#}Rankings from AP Poll released prior to game. All times are in Central Time.

=== Championship Game ===
Date	Time	Visiting team	Home team	Site	TV	Result	Attendance	Ref.
December 7	6:30 p.m.	**Marshall**	**Louisiana**	Cajun Field • Lafayette, LA	ESPN	**MU** 31–3	20,067	
^{#}Rankings from AP Poll released prior to game. All times are in Central Time.

== Postseason ==
=== Bowl Games ===
Legend
Sun Belt win
Sun Belt loss

Bowl game	Date	Site	Television	Time (CST)	Sun Belt team	Opponent	Score	Attendance
Salute to Veterans Bowl	December 14	Cramton Bowl • Montgomery, AL	ESPN	8:00 p.m.	South Alabama	Western Michigan	W 30–23	12,021
Boca Raton Bowl	December 18	FAU Stadium • Boca Raton, FL	ESPN	4:30 p.m.	James Madison	Western Kentucky	W 27–17	15,808
New Orleans Bowl	December 19	Caesars Superdome • New Orleans, LA	ESPN2	6:00 p.m.	Georgia Southern	Sam Houston	L 26–31	13,151
Myrtle Beach Bowl	December 23	Brooks Stadium • Conway, SC	ESPN	10:00 a.m.	Coastal Carolina	UTSA	L 15–44	8,164
68 Ventures Bowl	December 26	Hancock Whitney Stadium • Mobile, AL	ESPN	8:00 p.m.	Arkansas State	Bowling Green	W 38–31	19,582
New Mexico Bowl	December 28	University Stadium • Albuquerque, NM	ESPN	1:15 p.m.	Louisiana	TCU	L 3–34	22,827
First Responder Bowl	January 3, 2025	Gerald J. Ford Stadium • University Park, TX	ESPN	3:00 p.m.	Texas State	North Texas	W 30–28	28,725

- Marshall was originally selected to play in the Independence Bowl against Army. However, Marshall later opted out of the bowl game due to a large number of players entering the NCAA transfer portal, preventing Marshall from being able to field a full team for the bowl.

== Head-to-head matchups ==
2024 Sun Belt head-to-head matchups
Team	Appalachian State	Arkansas State	Coastal Carolina	Georgia Southern	Georgia State	James Madison	Louisiana	Marshall	Old Dominion	South Alabama	Southern Miss	Texas State	Troy	UL Monroe
vs. Appalachian State	—	×	38–24	29–20	26–33	20–34	34–24	52–37	20–28	48–14	×	×	×	×
vs. Arkansas State	×	—	×	×	20–27	×	55–19	×	40–32	16–18	28–44	41–9	31–34	21–28
vs. Coastal Carolina	24–38	×	—	29–9	27–48	39–7	34–24	31–19	37–45	×	×	×	38–24	×
vs. Georgia Southern	20–29	×	9–29	—	21–38	14–28	×	23–24	47–19	30–34	×	×	28–20	×
vs. Georgia State	33–26	27–20	48–27	38–21	—	38–7	×	35–20	21–14	×	×	44–52	×	×
vs. James Madison	34–20	×	7–39	28–14	7–38	—	×	35–33	32–35	×	15–32	×	×	21–19
vs. Louisiana	24–34	19–55	24–34	×	×	×	—	×	×	24–22	13–23	17–23	30–51	23–37
vs. Marshall	37–52	×	19–31	24–23	20–35	33–35	×	—	35–42	×	3–37	×	×	23–28
vs. Old Dominion	28–20	32–40	45–37	19–47	14–21	35–32	×	42–35	—	×	×	14–24	×	×
vs. South Alabama	14–48	18–16	×	34–30	×	×	22–24	×	×	—	14–35	45–38	9–25	17–46
vs. Southern Miss	×	44–28	×	×	×	32–15	23–13	37–3	×	35–14	—	58–3	52–20	38–21
vs. Texas State	×	9–41	×	×	52–44	×	23–17	×	24–14	38–45	3–58	—	17–38	17–38
vs. Troy	×	34–31	24–38	20–28	×	×	51–30	×	×	25–9	20–52	38–17	—	13–9
vs. UL Monroe	×	28–21	×	×	×	19–21	37–23	28–23	×	46–17	21–38	38–17	9–13	—
Total	3–5	5–3	3–5	6–2	1–7	4–4	7–1	7–1	4–4	5–3	0–8	5–3	3–5	3–5
	APP	ARST	CCU	GASO	GAST	JMU	UL	MRSH	ODU	USA	USM	TXST	TROY	ULM

× – Matchup not played in 2024
Updated after the season.

== Sun Belt records vs other conferences ==
2024–2025 records against non-conference foes:

Power 4 Conferences	Record
ACC	2–5
Big Ten	0–3
Big 12	0–2
Notre Dame	0–0
SEC	1–6
Power 4 Total	3–16
Other FBS Conferences	Record
American	6–5
C-USA	2–2
Independents (Excluding Notre Dame)	0–1
MAC	3–1
Mountain West	1–2
Pac-12	0–0
Other FBS Total	12–11
FCS Opponents	Record
Football Championship Subdivision	13–0
Total Non-Conference Record	28–27

=== Sun Belt vs Power 5 matchups ===
This is a list of games the Sun Belt has scheduled versus power conference teams (ACC, Big 10, Big 12, Pac-12, Notre Dame and SEC). All rankings are from the current AP Poll at the time of the game.

Date	Conference	Visitor	Home	Site	Score
August 31	ACC	Georgia State	Georgia Tech	Bobby Dodd Stadium • Atlanta, GA	L 12–35
August 31	SEC	Old Dominion	South Carolina	Williams–Brice Stadium • Columbia, SC	L 19–23
August 31	SEC	Southern Miss	Kentucky	Kroger Field • Lexington, KY	L 0–31
September 7	ACC	Appalachian State	Clemson	Memorial Stadium • Clemson, SC	L 20–66
September 7	ACC	Marshall	Virginia Tech	Lane Stadium • Blacksburg, VA	L 14–31
September 12	Big 12	Arizona State	Texas State	Bobcat Stadium • San Marcos, TX	L 28–31
September 14	SEC	Vanderbilt	Georgia State	Center Parc Stadium • Atlanta, GA	W 36–32
September 14	ACC	Virginia Tech	Old Dominion	S.B. Ballard Stadium • Norfolk, VA	L 17–37
September 14	Big Ten	Arkansas State	Michigan	Michigan Stadium • Ann Arbor, MI	L 18–28
September 14	Big Ten	Troy	Iowa	Kinnick Stadium • Iowa City, IA	L 21–38
September 21	ACC	Virginia	Coastal Carolina	Brooks Stadium • Conway, SC	L 24–43
September 21	SEC	Georgia Southern	Ole Miss	Vaught–Hemingway Stadium • Oxford, MS	L 13–52
September 21	ACC	James Madison	North Carolina	Kenan Memorial Stadium • Chapel Hill, NC	W 70–50
September 21	Big Ten	Marshall	Ohio State	Ohio Stadium • Columbus, OH	L 14–49
September 21	Big 12	Arkansas State	Iowa State	Jack Trice Stadium • Ames, IA	L 7–52
September 21	SEC	Louisiana–Monroe	Texas	Darrell K Royal–Texas Memorial Stadium • Austin, TX	L 3–51
September 28	ACC	Louisiana	Wake Forest	Allegacy Federal Credit Union Stadium • Winston-Salem, NC	W 41–13
September 28	SEC	South Alabama	LSU	Tiger Stadium • Baton Rouge, LA	L 10–42
November 16	SEC	Louisiana–Monroe	Auburn	Jordan–Hare Stadium • Auburn, AL	L 14–48

=== Sun Belt vs Group of Five matchups ===
The following games include Sun Belt teams competing against teams from the American, C-USA, MAC, or Mountain West.

Date	Conference	Visitor	Home	Site	Score
August 29	C-USA	Coastal Carolina	Jacksonville State	AmFirst Stadium • Jacksonville, AL	W 55–27
August 31	Mountain West	Boise State	Georgia Southern	Paulson Stadium • Statesboro, GA	L 45–56
August 31	American	James Madison	Charlotte	Jerry Richardson Stadium • Charlotte, NC	W 30–7
August 31	American	North Texas	South Alabama	Hancock Whitney Stadium • Mobile, AL	L 38–52
August 31	Mountain West	Nevada	Troy	Veterans Memorial Stadium • Troy, AL	L 26–28
September 7	Mountain West	Georgia Southern	Nevada	Mackay Stadium • Reno, NV	W 20–17
September 7	American	East Carolina	Old Dominion	S.B. Ballard Stadium • Norfolk, VA	L 14–20
September 7	American	Tulsa	Arkansas State	Centennial Bank Stadium • Jonesboro, AR	W 28–24
September 7	C-USA	Louisiana	Kennesaw State	Fifth Third Bank Stadium • Kennesaw, GA	W 34–10
September 7	American	UAB	Louisiana–Monroe	JPS Field at Malone Stadium • Monroe, LA	W 32–6
September 7	MAC	South Alabama	Ohio	Peden Stadium • Athens, OH	L 20–27
September 7	American	UTSA	Texas State	Bobcat Stadium • San Marcos, Texas	W 49–10
September 7	American	Troy	Memphis	Simmons Bank Liberty Stadium • Memphis, TN	L 17–38
September 14	American	Appalachian State	East Carolina	Dowdy–Ficklen Stadium • Greenville, NC	W 21–19
September 14	American	Coastal Carolina	Temple	Lincoln Financial Field • Philadelphia, PA	W 28–20
September 14	American	South Florida	Southern Miss	M. M. Roberts Stadium • Hattiesburg, MS	L 24–49
September 21	American	Tulane	Louisiana	Cajun Field • Lafayette, LA	L 33–41
September 21	C-USA	Southern Miss	Jacksonville State	AmFirst Stadium • Jacksonville, AL	L 7–44
September 28	C-USA	Liberty	Appalachian State	Kidd Brewer Stadium • Boone, NC	Canceled
September 28	MAC	Ball State	James Madison	Bridgeforth Stadium • Harrisonburg, VA	W 63–7
September 28	MAC	Western Michigan	Marshall	Joan C. Edwards Stadium • Huntington, WV	W 27–20
September 28	MAC	Old Dominion	Bowling Green	Doyt Perry Stadium • Bowling Green, OH	W 30–27
September 28	C-USA	Texas State	Sam Houston	NRG Stadium • Houston, TX	L 39–40

=== Sun Belt vs FBS independents matchups ===
The following games include Sun Belt teams competing against FBS Independents, which includes UConn, or UMass.

Date	Visitor	Home	Site	Score
November 2	Georgia State	UConn	Rentschler Field • East Hartford, CT	L 27–34

=== Sun Belt vs FCS matchups ===
Date	Visitor	Home	Site	Score
August 29	Jackson State	Louisiana–Monroe	JPS Field at Malone Stadium • Monroe, LA	W 30–14
August 31	East Tennessee State	Appalachian State	Kidd Brewer Stadium • Boone, NC	W 38–10
August 31	Stony Brook	Marshall	Joan C. Edwards Stadium • Huntington, WV	W 45–3
August 31	Central Arkansas	Arkansas State	Centennial Bank Stadium • Jonesboro, AR	W 34–31
August 31	Grambling State	Louisiana	Cajun Field • Lafayette, LA	W 40–10
August 31	Lamar	Texas State	Bobcat Stadium • San Marcos, TX	W 34–27
September 7	William & Mary	Coastal Carolina	Brooks Stadium • Conway, SC	W 40–21
September 7	Chattanooga	Georgia State	Center Parc Stadium • Atlanta, GA	W 24–21
September 7	Gardner–Webb	James Madison	Bridgeforth Stadium • Harrisonburg, VA	W 13–6
September 7	Southeastern Louisiana	Southern Miss	M. M. Roberts Stadium • Hattiesburg, MS	W 35–10
September 12	Northwestern State	South Alabama	Hancock Whitney Stadium • Mobile, AL	W 87–10
September 14	South Carolina State	Georgia Southern	Paulson Stadium • Statesboro, GA	W 42–14
September 21	Florida A&M	Troy	Veterans Memorial Stadium • Troy, AL	W 34–12

== Awards and honors ==
=== Player of the week honors ===
Week	Offensive			Defensive			Special Teams		
Week	Player	Team	Position	Player	Team	Position	Player	Team	Position
Week 1	Ethan Vasko	Coastal Carolina	QB	Wydett Williams Jr.	Louisiana–Monroe	DB	Clune Van Andel	Arkansas State	K
Week 2	Jordan McCloud	Texas State	QB	Jahron Manning	Old Dominion	DB	Courtney Jackson	Arkansas State	RS
Week 3	Joey Aguilar	Appalachian State	QB	Kevin Swint	Georgia State	LB	Devonte Ross	Troy	RS
Week 4	Alonza Barnett III	James Madison	QB	Jordan Scruggs	South Alabama	DB	Terrence Spence	James Madison	DB
Week 5	Alonza Barnett III (2)	James Madison	QB	J.J. Roberts	Marshall	DB	Kenneth Almendares	Louisiana	K
Week 6	Braylon Braxton	Marshall	QB	Cameron Whitfield	Louisiana	LB	Clune Van Andel (2)	Arkansas State	K
Week 7	Jordan McCloud (2)	Texas State	QB	Marques Watson-Trent	Georgia Southern	LB	Kenneth Almendares (2)	Louisiana	K
Week 8	A. J. Turner	Marshall	RB	Jayden Jones	Arkansas State	DL	Rece Verhoff	Marshall	K
Week 9	Colton Joseph	Old Dominion	QB	Jacob Dobbs	James Madison	LB	Cam Ross	James Madison	RS
Week 10	Damien Taylor	Troy	RB	Mike Green	Marshall	DL	Kenneth Almendares (3)	Louisiana	K
Week 11	Dre'lyn Washington	Louisiana	RB	Clev Lubin	Coastal Carolina	DL	Kenneth Almendares (4)	Louisiana	K
Week 12	Matthew Caldwell	Troy	QB	Bryan Whitehead	Arkansas State	DL	J. J. Roberts	Marshall	DB
Week 13	Braylon Braxton (2)	Marshall	QB	Keyon Martin	Louisiana	DB	Robert Williams	Louisiana	RS
Week 14	Quinn Henicle	Old Dominion	QB	Tobias Fletcher	Coastal Carolina	DB	Scott Taylor Renfroe	Troy	K

=== Sun Belt individual awards ===
The following individuals received postseason honors as voted by the Sun Belt Conference football coaches at the end of the season.

Award	Player	School
Player of the Year	Mike Green	Marshall
Offensive Player of the Year	Ben Wooldridge	Louisiana
Defensive Player of the Year	Marques Watson-Trent	Georgia Southern
Freshman Player of the Year	Ahmad Hardy	Louisiana–Monroe
Newcomer of the Year	Braylon Braxton	Marshall
Coach of the Year	Michael Desormeaux	Louisiana

=== All-Conference teams ===
The following players were selected as part of the Sun Belt's All-Conference Teams.

Position	Player	Team
First Team Offense
QB	Ben Wooldridge	Louisiana
RB	Ahmad Hardy	Louisiana–Monroe
RB	Ismail Mahdi	Texas State
OL	Pat McMurtrie	James Madison
OL	Cole Potts	James Madison
OL	Landon Burton	Louisiana
OL	AJ Gillie	Louisiana
OL	Logan Osburn	Marshall
TE	Terrance Carter	Louisiana
WR	Kaedin Robisnon	Appalachian State
WR	Jamaal Pritchett	South Alabama
WR	Devonte Ross	Troy
First Team Defense
DL	Santana Hopper	Appalachian State
DL	Clev Lubin	Coastal Carolina
DL	Eric O'Neill	James Madison
DL	Mike Green	Marshall
LB	Marques Watson-Trent	Georgia Southern
LB	K.C. Ossai	Louisiana
LB	Jaden Yates	Marshall
DB	Trevian Thomas	Arkansas State
DB	Matthew McDoom	Coastal Carolina
DB	Terrence Spence	James Madison
DB	J. J. Roberts	Marshall
DB	Jaden Voisin	South Alabama
First Team Specialists
K	Kenneth Almendares	Louisiana
P	Bryce Lofton	Southern Miss
RS	Ian Foster	Marshall
AP	Devonte Ross	Troy

Position	Player	Team
Second Team Offense
QB	Braylon Braxton	Marshall
RB	A.J. Turner	Marshall
RB	Damien Taylor	Troy
OL	Jack Hollifield	Appalachian State
OL	Jacob Bayer	Arkansas State
OL	Mehki Butler	Arkansas State
OL	Bryson Broadway	Georgia Southern
OL	Daniel King	Troy
TE	Dorian Fleming	Georgia State
WR	Corey Rucker	Arkansas State
WR	Ted Hurst	Georgia State
WR	Joey Hobert	Texas State
Second Team Defense
DL	Khairi Manns	James Madison
DL	Jordan Lawson	Louisiana
DL	Kevontay Wells	Louisiana–Monroe
DL	Wy'Kevious Thomas	South Alabama
LB	Jacob Dobbs	James Madison
LB	Koa Naotala	Old Dominion
LB	Blayne Myrick	South Alabama
DB	Chance Gamble	Georgia Southern
DB	Marc Stampley II	Georgia Southern
DB	Jacob Thomas	James Madison
DB	Tyrone Lewis	Louisiana
DB	Tyree Skipper	Louisiana
Second Team Specialists
K	Laith Marjan	South Alabama
P	James Allen	Georgia State
RS	Devonte Ross	Troy
AP	Ismail Mahdi	Texas State

Position	Player	Team
Third Team Offense
QB	Jordan McCloud	Texas State
RB	Ahmani Marshall	Appalachian State
RB	Fluff Bothwell	South Alabama
OL	Caleb Cook	Georgia Southern
OL	Pichon Wimbley	Georgia Southern
OL	Zach Barlev	Old Dominion
OL	Jordan Davis	South Alabama
OL	Alex Harkey	Texas State
TE	Pat Conroy	Old Dominion
WR	Makai Jackson	Appalachian State
WR	Lance LeGendre	Louisiana
WR	Isiah Paige	Old Dominion
Third Team Defense
DL	Bryan Whitehead	Arkansas State
DL	Billy Pullen	Louisiana–Monroe
DL	Deeve Harris	Marshall
DL	Kris Trinidad	Old Dominion
LB	Marvin Ham	Arkansas State
LB	Kevin Swint	Georgia State
LB	Carl Glass Jr.	Louisiana–Monroe
LB	Brendan Jackson	Troy
DB	Keyon Martin	Louisiana
DB	Wydett Williams Jr.	Louisiana–Monroe
DB	Jacobie Henderson	Marshall
DB	Jahron Manning	Old Dominion
Third Team Specialists
K	Clune Van Andel	Arkansas State
P	Ryan Hanson	James Madison
RS	Cam Ross	James Madison
AP	Jamaal Pritchett	South Alabama

=== National awards ===
- Lou Groza Award: Kenneth Almendares, Louisiana

== NFL draft ==
The NFL draft will be held at Lambeau Field in Green Bay, Wisconsin. The following list includes all Sun Belt players in the draft.

=== List of selections ===
Player	Position	School	Draft round	Round pick	Overall pick	Team
Mike Green	LB	Marshall	2	27	59	Baltimore Ravens
