= Keyon Martin =

American football player (born 2001)

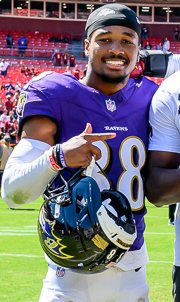
- Martin with the Baltimore Ravens in 2025

No. 38 – Baltimore Ravens
- Position: Cornerback
- Roster status: Active

Personal information
- Born: May 16, 2001 (age 25); Deerfield Beach, Florida, U.S.
- Listed height: 5 ft 9 in (1.75 m)
- Listed weight: 171 lb (78 kg)

Career information
- High school: United States Air Force Academy Preparatory School (Colorado Springs, Colorado)
- College: Youngstown State (2020–2021); Louisiana (2022–2024)
- NFL draft: 2025: undrafted

Career history
- Baltimore Ravens (2025–present)

Awards and highlights
- Third team All-Sun Belt (2024)

Career NFL statistics as of 2025
- Tackles: 23
- Sacks: 1
- Stats at Pro Football Reference

Keyon Martin (born May 16, 2001) is an American professional football cornerback for the Baltimore Ravens of the National Football League (NFL). He played college football for the Youngstown State Penguins and Louisiana Ragin' Cajuns and was signed by the Ravens as an undrafted free agent in 2025.

== Early life ==
Martin was born on May 16, 2001, and grew up in Fort Lauderdale, Florida. His father, Manny Martin, played five seasons in the NFL. He attended Deerfield Beach High School where he competed in football and track and field. In football, he helped his school win the regional championship while posting 55 tackles, 14 pass breakups and two interceptions. He committed to play college football for the Akron Zips, but after a coaching change they withdrew his scholarship offer, and thus he spent a year attending the United States Air Force Academy Preparatory School. After this, he committed to play for the Youngstown State Penguins.

== College career ==
As a freshman at Youngstown State, during the spring 2021 season, Martin started seven games, posting 24 tackles, an interception and two pass breakups. He then posted 32 tackles, 10 pass breakups and an interception for the Penguins in the fall 2021 season. After the season, he transferred to the Louisiana Ragin' Cajuns in 2022. In his first season with the Ragin' Cajuns, Martin appeared in 11 games and recorded 15 tackles and a pass breakup. He then started all 13 games in 2023 and made 53 tackles, seven pass breakups and an interception. During a 2024 game against Texas State, he was carted off with an injury. In his return three weeks later against Troy, he made two interceptions. He finished the 2024 season with 56 tackles.

== Professional career ==
Pre-draft measurables
Height	Weight	Arm length	Hand span	Wingspan	40-yard dash	10-yard split	20-yard split	20-yard shuttle	Three-cone drill	Vertical jump	Broad jump
5 ft 9 1/4 in (1.76 m)	170 lb (77 kg)	29 5/8 in (0.75 m)	8 1/2 in (0.22 m)	5 ft 11 in (1.80 m)	4.38 s	1.52 s	2.56 s	4.20 s	6.89 s	38.0 in (0.97 m)	10 ft 4 in (3.15 m)
All values from Pro Day

At his pro day, Martin recorded a 40-yard dash time of 4.38 seconds. After going unselected in the 2025 NFL draft, he signed with the Baltimore Ravens after impressing at their rookie minicamp. He was a standout performer in preseason, posting a safety in the second preseason game and returning an interception for a touchdown in the third.
