= Manny Martin =

American football player and coach (born 1969)

Profile
- Positions: Cornerback, safety

Personal information
- Born: July 31, 1969 (age 57); Miami, Florida, U.S.
- Listed height: 5 ft 11 in (1.80 m)
- Listed weight: 184 lb (83 kg)

Career information
- College: Alabama State
- NFL draft: 1992: undrafted

Career history
- Houston Oilers (1992)*; Houston Oilers (1993); Ottawa Rough Riders (1994–1995); Buffalo Bills (1996–1999); BC Lions (2002)
- * Offseason or practice squad member only

Career NFL statistics
- Games played: 54
- Interceptions: 5
- Tackles: 64
- Stats at Pro Football Reference

Emanuel C. Martin (born July 31, 1969) is an American former professional football player who was a defensive back in the National Football League (NFL) and Canadian Football League (CFL). He played college football for the Alabama State Hornets. Martin played five years in the NFL as a cornerback and safety for the Houston Oilers and Buffalo Bills. He is the current head football coach at Dillard High School in Fort Lauderdale, Florida.

== Early life ==
A native of Miami, Florida, Martin attended Miami Central High School, where he played defensive back for the football team in the late 1980s. He subsequently attended Alabama State University.

== Professional football career ==
After graduating from Alabama State, Martin played in three games for the Houston Oilers during the 1993 NFL season. In 1995, he played for the Ottawa Rough Riders in the Canadian Football League.

In 1996, Martin tried out with the Buffalo Bills, where he was considered "the longest of long shots." Despite the odds, Martin made the team and became a major contributor in the Bills' secondary over the next four years. In one of his first games for Buffalo, he made a name for himself when he made two interceptions (and nearly grabbed a third) off Troy Aikman on back-to-back possessions during the third quarter of a win over the Dallas Cowboys. During a pre-season game against the Seattle Seahawks in August 1999, he returned an interception 96 yards for a touchdown. Martin's NFL career ended in October 1999, when, at age 30, he suffered torn ligaments in his knee. During his NFL career, Martin played in 54 games (six as a starter), intercepted five passes, and had 64 tackles.

== Coaching career ==
After retiring from the NFL, Martin became a high school math teacher and football coach in south Florida. He was the defensive coordinator at Deerfield Beach High School in Deerfield Beach, Florida, when Denard Robinson played there. Interviewed in September 2010, Martin recalled Denard Robinson as a freshman trying to persuade him to give him a position on the varsity football team as a defensive back. Martin recalled, "To see where he was at then, and to see where he is now, it's a blessing. This is the reward we get as high school coaches. You spend time with a kid, and then you watch what happens."

In 2007, Martin became the head football coach at his alma mater, Central High School. He led the team back to the playoffs in 2007, but he was fired after one season. Martin told The Miami Herald at the time, "I was told Friday afternoon by the principal, and he said they wanted to move in a different direction."

Since 2009, Martin has been the head football coach at Dillard High School in Ft. Lauderdale, Florida.

== Personal life ==
Martin's son, Keyon, plays in the NFL for the Baltimore Ravens.
