= Mike Green (outside linebacker) =

American football player (born 2003)

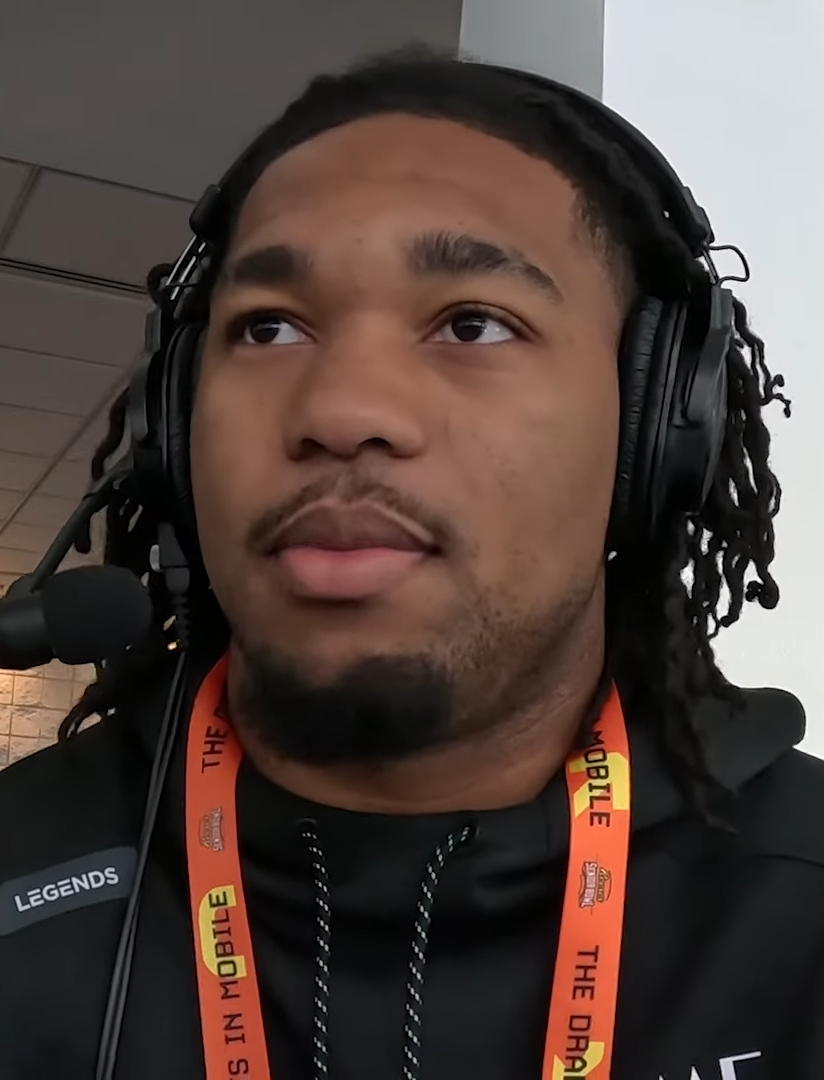
- Green in 2025

No. 15 – Baltimore Ravens
- Position: Outside linebacker
- Roster status: Active

Personal information
- Born: July 28, 2003 (age 23); Newport News, Virginia, U.S.
- Listed height: 6 ft 3 in (1.91 m)
- Listed weight: 250 lb (113 kg)

Career information
- High school: Lafayette (Williamsburg, Virginia)
- College: Virginia (2021–2022); Marshall (2023–2024)
- NFL draft: 2025: 2nd round, 59th overall pick

Career history
- Baltimore Ravens (2025–present)

Awards and highlights
- First-team All-American (2024); Sun Belt Player of the Year (2024)

Career NFL statistics as of 2025
- Tackles: 41
- Sacks: 3.5
- Fumble recoveries: 1
- Stats at Pro Football Reference

Michael Green (born July 28, 2003) is an American professional football outside linebacker for the Baltimore Ravens of the National Football League (NFL). He played college football for the Virginia Cavaliers and Marshall Thundering Herd, being named the 2024 Sun Belt Player of the Year with the latter after leading all FBS players with 17 sacks. He was selected by the Ravens in the second round of the 2025 NFL draft.

== Early life ==
Green was born on July 28, 2003, in Newport News, Virginia. He attended Lafayette High School in Williamsburg, Virginia. He played linebacker and tight end in high school. He committed to the University of Virginia to play college football.

== College career ==
As a true freshman at Virginia in 2021, Green played in six games and had four tackles and one sack. After not playing in any games in 2022, he entered the transfer portal and transferred to Marshall University.

In his first year at Marshall in 2023, he had 43 tackles and 4.5 sacks. Green returned to Marshall as a starter in 2024 where he led the nation with 17 sacks. This set a Sunbelt single season record and also tied Cecil Fletcher for the Marshall single season record. He helped the Herd to their first ever Sun Belt Conference Championship. Following the championship game he declared for the 2025 NFL draft.

== Professional career ==
Pre-draft measurables
Height	Weight	Arm length	Hand span	Wingspan	20-yard shuttle	Three-cone drill	Bench press
6 ft 3 1/8 in (1.91 m)	251 lb (114 kg)	32 in (0.81 m)	8 1/2 in (0.22 m)	6 ft 5 5/8 in (1.97 m)	4.25 s	6.85 s	28 reps
All values from NFL Combine/Pro Day

Green was selected by the Baltimore Ravens with the 59th overall pick in the second round of the 2025 NFL draft.

On April 21, 2026, Green changed his jersey number from No. 45 to No. 15 in the 2026 NFL season, ahead of the Ravens’ voluntary veteran minicamp.

== Career statistics ==
=== NFL ===
Year	Team	Games		Tackles					Interceptions						Fumbles				
Year	Team	GP	GS	Cmb	Solo	Ast	Sck	TFL	Int	Yds	Avg	Lng	TD	PD	FF	Fmb	FR	Yds	TD
2025	BAL	17	2	41	17	24	3.5	7	0	0	0.0	0	0	0	0	0	1	0	0
2026	BAL	1	1	2	2	2	5.5	0	0	0	0.0	0	0	0	0	0	0	0	0
Career		19	4	43	19	26	4.5	7	0	0	0.0	0	0	0	0	0	1	0	0

=== College ===
Legend
	Sun Belt Player of the Year
**Bold**	Career high

Year	Team	GP	Tackles					Fumbles				Interceptions			
Year	Team	GP	Solo	Ast	Comb	TFL	Sck	FF	FR	Yds	TD	Int	Yds	TD	PD
2021	Virginia	6	2	2	4	1	1.0	0	0	0	0	0	0	0	0
2022	Virginia	Suspended													
2023	Marshall	**13**	22	21	43	9	4.5	1	0	0	0	0	0	0	0
2024	Marshall	**13**	**38**	**46**	**84**	**23**	**17.0**	**3**	**1**	0	0	0	0	0	**2**
Career		32	62	69	131	33	22.5	4	1	0	0	0	0	0	2

== Legal issues ==
Green has twice been accused of sexual assault, once when he was in high school and a second time while he was at the University of Virginia. Green was suspended by Virginia in 2022 before entering the transfer portal, however has denied that his decision to transfer was due to the allegations against him.
