= Stockar McDougle =

American football player (born 1977)

No. 73
- Position: Guard / Tackle

Personal information
- Born: January 11, 1977 (age 49); Pompano Beach, Florida, U.S.
- Listed height: 6 ft 6 in (1.98 m)
- Listed weight: 340 lb (154 kg)

Career information
- High school: Deerfield Beach (FL)
- College: Oklahoma
- NFL draft: 2000: 1st round, 20th overall pick

Career history
- Detroit Lions (2000–2004); Miami Dolphins (2005); Jacksonville Jaguars (2006–2007)

Awards and highlights
- Third-team All-American (1999)

Career NFL statistics
- Games played: 81
- Games started: 56
- Stats at Pro Football Reference

Stockar McDougle (born January 11, 1977) is an American former professional football player who was an offensive lineman in the National Football League (NFL). He was selected by the Detroit Lions 20th overall in the 2000 NFL draft. He played college football for the Oklahoma Sooners.

== Early life and college ==
McDougle was born in Pompano Beach, Florida. He was in the top prep offensive linemen in the nation when graduated from Deerfield Beach High School in 1996. He was named a JUCO All-American in 1996 and 1997 at Navarro Junior College before transferring to the University of Oklahoma in 1998.

== Professional career ==
The Detroit Lions selected McDougle with the 20th overall pick in the first round of the 2000 NFL draft. Debuting in Week 10 (November 5, 2000) against the Atlanta Falcons, McDougle started all eight games he played as a rookie. McDougle started 3 of 9 games in 2001 and 11 of 12 games in 2002. In 2003 and 2004, McDougle played full 16-game seasons as a right tackle and started every game. The Lions allowed a franchise-record low 11 sacks in 2003 followed by 37 in 2004. Also in 2004, McDougle helped rookie running back Kevin Jones rush for 1,133 yards, the fifth-most in the NFC that season.

On March 15, 2005, McDougle signed with the Miami Dolphins. With the Dolphins, McDougle played nine games and started two.

One year to the day he signed with the Dolphins, McDougle signed with the Jacksonville Jaguars on March 15, 2006. McDougle played in 11 games in 2006 with no starts. The Jaguars placed McDougle on injured reserve on August 18, 2007, for a ruptured Achilles tendon. McDougle sat out the entire 2007 season.

== Personal life ==
McDougle is the older brother of defensive end Jerome McDougle and has two cousins who played in the NFL: safety Tyrone Carter and defensive tackle Tommie Harris. McDougle is married and has five children.
