= Elton Nesbitt =

American basketball player (born 1980)

Personal information
- Born: March 26, 1980 (age 46) Fort Lauderdale, Florida, U.S.
- Listed height: 5 ft 9 in (1.75 m)
- Listed weight: 165 lb (75 kg)

Career information
- High school: Deerfield Beach (Deerfield Beach, Florida)
- College: Compton College (2002–2003); Georgia Southern (2003–2006)
- NBA draft: 2006: undrafted
- Playing career: 2006–2010
- Position: Point guard

Career history
- 2006–2007: Sioux Falls Skyforce
- 2007: Dodge City Legend
- 2007–2008: Sioux Falls Skyforce
- 2008–2009: Belfius Mons-Hainaut
- 2009–2010: Kryvbasbasket

Career highlights
- AP Honorable Mention All-American (2006); SoCon Player of the Year (2006); 2× First-team All-SoCon (2005, 2006)

Elton Nesbitt II (born March 26, 1980) is an American former professional basketball player. He is best known for his college career at Georgia Southern University.

== High school and junior college career ==
Nesbitt, a 5'9" point guard, led Deerfield Beach High School in Deerfield Beach, Florida to a 34–1 record and a 6A state championship as a senior. However, as an academic non-qualifier he was not recruited to play college basketball and instead worked a series of retail jobs until Georgia Southern coach Jeff Price helped him enroll at Compton College. Nesbitt excelled in his year in junior college, averaging 26.6 points and 3.4 assists per game.

== College career ==
In 2003, Nesbitt moved to Georgia Southern, where as a sophomore in 2003–04 he averaged 15.7 points and helped the team to a 21–8 record. As a junior, he became one of the top scorers in the Southern Conference (SoCon). He averaged 20.2 points per game. At the close of the season, Nesbitt was named first team All-Conference.

As a junior, Nesbitt again raised his level of play. He led the SoCon in scoring at 21.7 points per game, including a 43-point game against Chattanooga. Nesbitt's scoring prowess helped the Eagles to the 2006 National Invitation Tournament, the school's first postseason appearance in 14 seasons. At the close of the regular season, Nesbitt was named Southern Conference Player of the Year by both the league's media and coaches. He was also named an honorable mention All-American by the Associated Press.

== Professional career ==
After the close of his college career, Nesbitt was not selected in the 2006 NBA draft. He instead signed on to play with the Sioux Falls Skyforce of the NBA Development League. He played two seasons for the Skyforce, averaging 12.1 points and 3.1 assists per game for his D-League career. He then moved to Belgium, where he scored 11.8 points per game for Belfius Mons-Hainaut of the Ethias League. Nesbitt last played for Kryvbasbasket in Ukraine.
