= Bryant Vincent =

American football coach (born 1975)

Current position
- Title: Head coach
- Team: Louisiana–Monroe
- Conference: Sun Belt
- Record: 10–25

Biographical details
- Born: October 18, 1975 (age 51); Glasgow, Kentucky, U.S.
- Education: West Alabama

Coaching career (HC unless noted)
- 1996–1997: West Alabama (SA)
- 1998: Hart County HS (KY) (assistant)
- 1999–2002: Charles Henderson HS (AL) (assistant)
- 2003–2005: Spain Park HS (AL) (AHC)
- 2006: Greenville HS (AL)
- 2007–2010: Spanish Fort HS (AL)
- 2011: South Alabama (TE)
- 2012–2013: South Alabama (QB)
- 2014: UAB (OC/QB)
- 2015–2017: South Alabama (AHC/co-OC/QB)
- 2018–2021: UAB (OC/QB)
- 2022: UAB (interim HC)
- 2023: New Mexico (OC/QB)
- 2024–present: Louisiana–Monroe

Administrative career (AD unless noted)
- 2025: Louisiana–Monroe (interim AD)

Head coaching record
- Overall: 17–31 (college); 49–16 (high school)
- Bowls: 1–0

Bryant Vincent (born October 18, 1975) is an American college football coach who is currently the head coach at the University of Louisiana at Monroe. Vincent was elevated to interim head coach at UAB in June 2022 after Bill Clark announced his retirement. He was named the head football coach at Louisiana–Monroe in December 2023, and was later appointed the university's interim athletic director, serving in the latter position until November 2025.

== Coaching career ==
=== High school ===
After graduating from Glasgow High School in the Kentucky city of that name, Vincent originally enrolled at nearby Western Kentucky University, but spent only one semester there before transferring to the University of West Alabama. After his arrival at West Alabama, he joined the baseball program before joining the football program as a student assistant in 1996. After graduating from West Alabama, he worked as an elementary school teacher and assistant football coach in Hart County, Kentucky before returning to Alabama the next year.

Vincent was an assistant coach at Charles Henderson High School and Spain Park High School in Alabama before being named the head coach at Greenville High School in 2006. Greenville went 10–3 in Vincent's lone season at the helm, and Vincent won the Class 5A Coach of the Year Award. Vincent was also the head coach at Spanish Fort High School from 2007 to 2010, where he accumulated a record of 39–13 and led the Toros to the 5A state title in his final season at Spanish Fort.

=== South Alabama ===
Vincent was hired to be the tight ends coach at South Alabama in 2011. He was reassigned to quarterbacks coach in 2012.

=== UAB ===
Vincent was hired as the offensive coordinator at UAB in 2014. The football program was shut down after the season.

=== South Alabama (second stint) ===
Vincent was hired back at South Alabama in 2015 as their assistant head coach, co-offensive coordinator, and quarterbacks coach. He was fired by South Alabama in September 2017.

=== UAB (second stint) ===
Vincent was hired as the offensive coordinator and quarterbacks coach at UAB in 2018.

=== New Mexico ===
Vincent was named the offensive coordinator at New Mexico on January 3, 2023.

=== University of Louisiana Monroe ===
Vincent was named the head coach at the University of Louisiana at Monroe on December 5, 2023. On August 5, 2025, Vincent was appointed as the university's interim athletic director following the resignation of previous AD John Hartwell. Vincent served as the university's athletic director until November 28, 2025, at which point S.J. Tuohy was appointed to the position.

== Head coaching record ==
=== College ===
Year	Team	Overall	Conference	Standing	Bowl/playoffs
UAB Blazers (Conference USA) (2022)
2022	UAB	7–6 (Note: Served as interim head coach after Bill Clark retired prior to the season.)	4–4	T–4th	W Bahamas
UAB:		7–6	4–4		
Louisiana–Monroe Warhawks (Sun Belt Conference) (2024–present)
2024	Louisiana–Monroe	5–7	3–5	T–5th (West)	
2025	Louisiana–Monroe	3–9	1–7	7th (West)	
2026	Louisiana–Monroe	2–9	2–5		
Louisiana–Monroe:		10–25	6–17		
Total:		17–31			
