= Jacob Bayer =

American football player (born 2002)

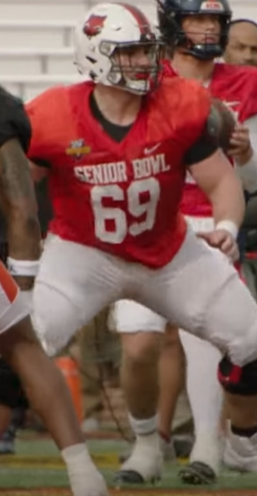
- Bayer at the 2025 Senior Bowl

No. 69 – Cincinnati Bengals
- Position: Center
- Roster status: Active

Personal information
- Born: December 12, 2002 (age 23); Grandview, Texas, U.S.
- Listed height: 6 ft 3 in (1.91 m)
- Listed weight: 310 lb (141 kg)

Career information
- High school: Grandview (TX)
- College: Lamar (2021–2022); Arkansas State (2023–2024)
- NFL draft: 2025: undrafted

Career history
- Buffalo Bills (2025)*; Cincinnati Bengals (2025–present)
- * Offseason or practice squad member only

Awards and highlights
- First-team All-Sun Belt (2023); Second-team All-Sun Belt (2024); 2024 Rimington Trophy Finalist
- Stats at Pro Football Reference

Jacob Bayer (born December 12, 2002) is an American professional football center for the Cincinnati Bengals of the National Football League (NFL). He played college football for the Lamar Cardinals and Arkansas State Red Wolves and was signed by the Buffalo Bills as an undrafted free agent in 2025.

== Early life ==
Bayer is from Grandview, Texas. He attended Grandview High School where he played as an offensive lineman and was named first-team all-county and all-state. He helped them win a state championship in 2019 and was also an academic all-district selection. He was also an all-state powerlifter and discus thrower, placing second in the 2022 THSPA state championship. A two-star recruit, he committed to play college football for the Lamar Cardinals.

== College career ==
Bayer started all 11 games for Lamar as a freshman in 2021, playing center. He then started all 11 games again in 2022 for the Cardinals, before opting to enter the NCAA transfer portal after the season, eventually committing to the Arkansas State Red Wolves. With the Red Wolves in 2023, he started 12 games at center and was named first-team All-Sun Belt Conference (SBC). He became the first All-SBC offensive lineman at Arkansas State since 2018. He suffered a torn ACL during the spring practices in 2024, but was able to return to action by the second game of the season, marking one of the fastest full ACL tear recoveries in college football history. He started the final 12 games of the season and was named second-team All-SBC, as well as a finalist for the Rimington Trophy. In his last two years, Bayer helped the Red Wolves to two bowl game appearances. He was invited to the 2025 Senior Bowl at the conclusion of his collegiate career.

== Professional career ==
Pre-draft measurables
Height	Weight	Arm length	Hand span	Wingspan	40-yard dash	10-yard split	20-yard split	20-yard shuttle	Three-cone drill	Vertical jump	Broad jump	Bench press
6 ft 2 3/4 in (1.90 m)	306 lb (139 kg)	32 in (0.81 m)	10 3/8 in (0.26 m)	6 ft 6 1/4 in (1.99 m)	5.21 s	1.79 s	2.92 s	4.83 s	8.01 s	28.0 in (0.71 m)	8 ft 6 in (2.59 m)	32 reps
All values from Pro Day

=== Buffalo Bills ===
On May 9, 2025, Bayer signed with the Buffalo Bills as an undrafted free agent after going unselected in the 2025 NFL draft. He was released on August 26 as part of final roster cuts.

=== Cincinnati Bengals ===
On November 3, 2025, Bayer was signed to the Cincinnati Bengals' practice squad. He signed a reserve/future contract with Cincinnati on January 5, 2026.
