= 2006 NCAA Men's Basketball All-Americans =

- Awarded for: 2005–06 NCAA Division I men's basketball season

The Consensus 2006 College Basketball All-American team, as determined by aggregating the results of four major All-American teams. To earn "consensus" status, a player must win honors from a majority of the following teams: the Associated Press, the USBWA, The Sporting News and the National Association of Basketball Coaches.

== 2006 Consensus All-America team ==
Consensus First Team
| Player | Position | Class | Team |
|---|---|---|---|
| Randy Foye | G | Senior | Villanova |
| Adam Morrison | F | Junior | Gonzaga |
| JJ Redick | G | Senior | Duke |
| Brandon Roy | G-F | Senior | Washington |
| Shelden Williams | C | Senior | Duke |

Consensus Second Team
| Player | Position | Class | Team |
|---|---|---|---|
| Dee Brown | G | Senior | Illinois |
| Rodney Carney | G | Senior | Memphis |
| Rudy Gay | F | Sophomore | Connecticut |
| Tyler Hansbrough | C | Freshman | North Carolina |
| Leon Powe | F | Sophomore | California |
| Allan Ray | G | Senior | Villanova |
| P. J. Tucker | F | Junior | Texas |

== Individual All-America teams ==
All-America Team
| All-America Team | First team | | Second team | | Third team | |
| All-America Team | Player | School | Player | School | Player | School |
|---|---|---|---|---|---|---|
| Associated Press | Randy Foye | Villanova | Dee Brown | Illinois | Glen Davis | LSU |
| Associated Press | Adam Morrison | Gonzaga | Rodney Carney | Memphis | Nick Fazekas | Nevada |
| Associated Press | JJ Redick | Duke | Rudy Gay | Connecticut | Tyler Hansbrough | North Carolina |
| Associated Press | Brandon Roy | Washington | Leon Powe | California | Allan Ray | Villanova |
| Associated Press | Shelden Williams | Duke | P. J. Tucker | Texas | Craig Smith | Boston College |
| USBWA | Randy Foye | Villanova | Dee Brown | Illinois | No third team | |
| USBWA | Adam Morrison | Gonzaga | Rodney Carney | Memphis | No third team | |
| USBWA | JJ Redick | Duke | Rudy Gay | Connecticut | No third team | |
| USBWA | Brandon Roy | Washington | Leon Powe | California | No third team | |
| USBWA | Shelden Williams | Duke | P. J. Tucker | Texas | No third team | |
| NABC | Randy Foye | Villanova | Dee Brown | Illinois | LaMarcus Aldridge | Texas |
| NABC | Rudy Gay | Connecticut | Rodney Carney | Memphis | Tyler Hansbrough | North Carolina |
| NABC | Adam Morrison | Gonzaga | Allan Ray | Villanova | Chris Lofton | Tennessee |
| NABC | JJ Redick | Duke | Brandon Roy | Washington | Kevin Pittsnogle | West Virginia |
| NABC | Shelden Williams | Duke | Craig Smith | Boston College | P. J. Tucker | Texas |
| Sporting News | Randy Foye | Villanova | Glen Davis | LSU | No third team | |
| Sporting News | Tyler Hansbrough | North Carolina | Chris Lofton | Tennessee | No third team | |
| Sporting News | Adam Morrison | Gonzaga | Leon Powe | California | No third team | |
| Sporting News | JJ Redick | Duke | Allan Ray | Villanova | No third team | |
| Sporting News | Brandon Roy | Washington | Shelden Williams | Duke | No third team | |

AP Honorable Mention:

- Arron Afflalo, UCLA
- Maurice Ager, Michigan State
- LaMarcus Aldridge, Texas
- José Juan Barea, Northeastern
- J. P. Batista, Gonzaga
- Jahsha Bluntt, Delaware State
- Ronnie Brewer, Arkansas
- Keydren Clark, Saint Peter's
- Mardy Collins, Temple
- Paul Davis, Michigan State
- Terence Dials, Ohio State
- Quincy Douby, Rutgers
- Jordan Farmar, UCLA
- Mike Gansey, West Virginia
- Daniel Gibson, Texas
- Caleb Green, Oral Roberts
- DeAndre Haynes, Kent State
- Brandon Heath, San Diego State
- Jeff Horner, Iowa
- Ibrahim Jaaber, Penn
- Jarrius Jackson, Texas Tech
- Marco Killingsworth, Indiana
- Carl Krauser, Pittsburgh
- Jack Leasure, Coastal Carolina
- Charles Lee, Bucknell
- Chris Lofton, Tennessee
- Christian Maraker, Pacific
- Gerry McNamara, Syracuse
- J. Robert Merritt, Samford
- Paul Miller, Wichita State
- Paul Millsap, Louisiana Tech
- Elton Nesbitt, Georgia Southern
- Joakim Noah, Florida
- Kevin Pittsnogle, West Virginia
- Chris Quinn, Notre Dame
- Brion Rush, Grambling State
- Blake Schilb, Loyola (IL)
- Steven Smith, La Salle
- Tim Smith, East Tennessee State
- Ronald Steele, Alabama
- Rodney Stuckey, Eastern Washington
- Chad Timberlake, Fairleigh Dickinson
- Darius Washington, Jr., Memphis
- Marcus Williams, Connecticut
- Jamar Wilson, Albany
- Anthony Winchester, Western Kentucky
- Ricky Woods, Southeastern Louisiana
