= People's Trust Insurance Company =

American home insurance company

- Type: Private company
- Industry: home insurance
- Founded: 2008; 18 years ago
- Founders: George Schaeffer and Michael Gold
- Headquarters: Florida, United States
- Area served: Florida
- Key people: George Schaeffer (CEO), Tom Gallagher (COO)
- Number of employees: 350 (2021)
- Website: peoplestrustinsurance.com

People's Trust Insurance Company is an American home insurance company located in Deerfield Beach, Florida. People's Trust Insurance is privately held and as of 2017 was the eleventh largest homeowners insurance company in the state with more than 110,000 policyholders throughout Florida.

George Schaeffer is currently the president and CEO of the company.

== History ==
The company was co-founded by George Schaeffer and Michael Gold in 2008.

According to the South Florida Business Journal, People's Trust Insurance was the second-fastest-growing company in South Florida from 2012 to 2014. The home insurance company has more than 350 employees, with 300 in Deerfield Beach.

In 2013, People's Trust Insurance received the Governor's Innovators in Business Award, which recognizes Florida companies in select industries that have influenced the state's economic growth and diversification over the last year. Independent financial analysis firm Demotech assigned People's Trust Insurance a Financial Stability Rating of "A," Exceptional.

== Rapid response team ==
The company includes an affiliation with Florida's largest insurance restoration general contractor, the Rapid Response Team LLC. The Rapid Response Team operates 11 response centers across Florida with more than 325 full-time construction technicians and roofers, 150 service trucks and millions of dollars in recovery supplies.

== Past company executives ==
- Michael Gold—Co-founder and chief executive officer—died January 26, 2014
- Mitch Politzer—President and Chief Operating Officer—retired 2015

== Lawsuits ==
In November, 2013, an appellate court upheld a jury award of $766,258.06 to a Florida policyholder who had lost his home in a house fire. That court stated,, "After his home was destroyed by a fire, appellee Raymond Roddy filed a claim with his insurer, appellant People's Trust Insurance Company. People denied coverage for numerous reasons, one being the claim that Roddy had made material misrepresentations on his application for insurance. The case was submitted to a jury, which awarded Roddy $766,258.06 in damages. The court upheld the jury award.
