= Wydett Williams =

American football player (born 2003)

Wydett Williams Jr.
No. 31 – Arizona Cardinals
- Position: Free safety
- Roster status: Active

Personal information
- Born: December 5, 2003 (age 22); Lake Providence, Louisiana, U.S.
- Listed height: 6 ft 1 in (1.85 m)
- Listed weight: 205 lb (93 kg)

Career information
- High school: General Trass (Lake Providence, Louisiana)
- College: Delta State (2022–2023); Louisiana-Monroe (2024); Ole Miss (2025)
- NFL draft: 2026: undrafted

Career history
- Arizona Cardinals (2026–present)

Awards and highlights
- Second-team All-SEC (2025); Third team All-Sun Belt (2024)

Career NFL statistics as of Week 5, 2026
- Total tackles: 7
- Pass deflections: 1
- Stats at Pro Football Reference

Wydett LaCaze Williams Jr. (born December 5, 2003) is an American professional football free safety for the Arizona Cardinals of the National Football League (NFL). He played college football for the Delta State Statesmen, Louisiana-Monroe Warhawks, and Ole Miss Rebels. He went undrafted in the 2026 NFL draft and was signed by the Cardinals as an undrafted free agent.

== Early life ==
Williams attended General Trass High School in Lake Providence, Louisiana. He was unranked as a zero-star recruit in the 2022 class and committed to Delta State, an NCAA Division II program.

== College career ==
=== Delta State ===
At Delta State, Williams played in 23 games across two years with 75 total tackles.

=== Louisiana-Monroe ===
Williams transferred to ULM in the 2024 season. He totaled 99 tackles, three interceptions, two fumble recoveries, and one forced fumble. He transferred to Ole Miss after the season.

=== Ole Miss ===
Rated as a three-star transfer, Williams chose to transfer to Ole Miss on April 25, 2025. He finished his season at Ole Miss with 73 total tackles, one fumble recovery, 10 pass breakups, and 3 interceptions.

== Professional career ==
Pre-draft measurables
Height	Weight	Arm length	Hand span	Wingspan	40-yard dash	10-yard split	20-yard split	20-yard shuttle	Three-cone drill	Vertical jump	Broad jump	Bench press
6 ft 1 3/8 in (1.86 m)	200 lb (91 kg)	31 5/8 in (0.80 m)	9 7/8 in (0.25 m)	6 ft 5 1/8 in (1.96 m)	4.56 s	1.58 s	2.55 s	4.28 s	7.20 s	33.5 in (0.85 m)	10 ft 0 in (3.05 m)	16 reps
All values from Pro Day

=== Arizona Cardinals ===
On April 25, 2026, Williams signed with the Arizona Cardinals as an undrafted free agent. He made the Cardinals 53-man roster as an undrafted rookie, playing five games before being waived on October 24 and re-signed to the practice squad. On November 17, Williams was signed to the active roster.
