= Deerfield Beach High School =

Public high school in Deerfield Beach, Florida, United States

Location
- 910 Buck Pride Way; Deerfield Beach, Florida 33441; United States; 26.2953576°N 80.1172663°W

Information
- School type: Public, Magnet
- Established: 1970
- School district: Broward County Public Schools
- Superintendent: Dr. Peter B. Licata
- Principal: Jon Marlow
- Staff: 87.00 (FTE)
- Grades: 9-12
- Enrollment: 2,120 (2024-2025)
- Student to teacher ratio: 24.37
- Colors: Scarlet; Gold
- Nickname: Bucks
- Website: https://deerfieldbeachhigh.browardschools.com/, https://www.deerfieldbeachhigh.net

Deerfield Beach High School (DBHS) is a public high school in Deerfield Beach, Florida. It is part of Broward County Public Schools and has an enrollment of approximately 2,400.

The school features the IB Middle Years Programme or Pre-IB, which is a prerequisite for the International Baccalaureate program that offers college-level academics to students in 11th and 12th grade. Deerfield has historically been a leader among Broward County schools in terms of the number of students winning the prestigious Silver Knight Awards. The graduation rate for the 2014–2015 academic year stood at 79.0% compared to the 74.5% state average and the 81.0% national average. In that same year, students scored an average of 1590 out of 2400 on the SAT (compared with a national average of 1720) and a 22 out of 36 (compared with a national average of 26) on the ACT. Deerfield Beach High has an FCAT school grade of "A" for the 2014–2015 academic school year.

On Saturday, September 6, 2014, the school's street address officially changed from 910 SW 15th Street to 910 Buck Pride Way This transition occurred with the assistance of the City of Deerfield Beach, members of the Deerfield Beach community, The Home Depot, Kiwanis, People's Trust Insurance Company, DBHS Student Government, Class of 2015, and DBHS Employees.

The school serves––in addition to much of Deerfield Beach––Hillsboro Beach, Lighthouse Point, and sections of Pompano Beach.

== Urban Teacher Academy Program ==
The Urban Teacher Academy Program (UTAP) is a magnet program aimed at training students to become teachers and community leaders. The minimum program requirements for entry and retention are maintaining a GPA of 2.0 and FCAT test scores of 3 or higher.

== Athletics ==
- Baseball
- Basketball
- Cheerleading
- Cross Country
- Flag Football
- Football
- Golf
- Soccer
- Softball, Varsity
- Swimming and Diving
- Tennis
- Track and Field
- Volleyball
- Water Polo
- Wrestling

== Demographics ==
As of the 2021–22 school year, the total student enrollment was 2,333. The ethnic makeup of the school was 52.9% Black, 10.7% White, 30.3% Hispanic, 2.8% Asian, 0.2% Pacific Islander, 2.7% Multiracial, and 0.4% Native American or Native Alaskan.

== Notable alumni ==
- Teri Weigel (1980): pornographic actress.
- Kelly Skidmore (1981): Democratic Florida State Representative for Florida's 90th House district (2006–2010), 81st House district (2020–present)
- Stockar McDougle (1996): American football linebacker in the NFL (2000–2006) selected in the first round of the 2000 NFL draft; played for the Detroit Lions (2000–2004), Miami Dolphins (2005) and Jacksonville Jaguars (2006)
- Julius Jenkins (1999): Professional basketball player for Science City Jena of the Basketball Bundesliga
- Elton Nesbitt (2000): basketball player who has played in the NBA Development League and internationally
- Alex Jacob (2002): professional poker player, 6 game Jeopardy! champion and 2015 Tournament of Champions winner
- Mike Fiers (2003): Major League Baseball pitcher
- Mickey Storey (2004): Major League Baseball player
- Jeremy Kellem (2007): Arena Football League player
- Jason Pierre-Paul (2007): American football defensive end in the NFL; played for the New York Giants (2010–2017), the Tampa Bay Buccaneers (2018–2021), the Baltimore Ravens (2022), the New Orleans Saints (2023) and the Miami Dolphins (2023); first-round 2010 NFL draft pick; winner of Super Bowl XLVI
- Denard Robinson (2009): American football running back in the NFL for the Jacksonville Jaguars. Former quarterback for the University of Michigan (2009–2012).
- Brandon Powell (2014): American football wide receiver in the NFL for the Minnesota Vikings; played for the Detroit Lions (2018), the Atlanta Falcons (2019–2020), the Buffalo Bills (2021), the Miami Dolphins (2021) and the Los Angeles Rams (2021–2022). Former wide receiver for the Florida Gators (2014–2017).
- Jason Strowbridge (2015): American football defensive end in the NFL: played for the Miami Dolphins (2020–2021).
- Riley Ridley (2016): American football wide receiver in the NFL; played for the Chicago Bears (2019–2020). Former wide receiver for the Georgia Bulldogs (2016–2018).
- Aaron Robinson (2016): American football cornerback in the NFL for the New York Giants. Former cornerback for the Alabama Crimson Tide football (2016) and the UCF Knights (2017–2020).
- Daewood Davis (2017): American football wide receiver in the NFL for the Carolina Panthers; played for the Miami Dolphins (2023) and in the UFL for the Memphis Showboats (2024). Former wide receiver for the Oregon Ducks (2017–2020) and the Western Kentucky Hilltoppers (2021–2022).
- Jerry Jeudy (2017): American football wide receiver in the NFL for the Cleveland Browns; played for the Denver Broncos (2020–2023). Former wide receiver for the Alabama Crimson Tide (2017–2019).
- Brandon Dorlus (2019): American football defensive end in the NFL for the Atlanta Falcons. Former defensive end for the Oregon Ducks (2019–2023).
- Michael Pratt (2020): American football quarterback in the NFL for the Green Bay Packers. Former quarterback for the Tulane Green Wave (2020–2023).
- Xavier Restrepo (2020): American football wide receiver in the NFL for the Tennessee Titans. Former wide receiver for the Miami Hurricanes (2020–2024)
- Hezekiah Masses (2022): American football cornerback in the NFL for the Las Vegas Raiders. Former cornerback for the FIU Panthers (2022–2024) and the California Golden Bears (2025)
- Ace Hood, rapper.

== Notable faculty ==
- Allen West, A Republican U.S. Representative for Florida's 22nd congressional district (2011–2013) and lieutenant colonel in the United States Army, taught U.S. history at Deerfield Beach High in the 2004–2005 school year.
