= John Hartwell =

American college athletics administrator

Biographical details
- Born: c. 1965

Playing career
- 1983–1987: The Citadel

Administrative career (AD unless noted)
- 1997–1999: Georgia State (assistant AD)
- 1999–2003: Georgia State (associate AD)
- 2003–2012: Ole Miss (sr. ex. assoc. AD)
- 2012–2015: Troy
- 2015–2022: Utah State
- 2023–2025: Louisiana–Monroe

John Hartwell (born c. 1965) is an American college athletics administrator. He served as athletic director at Troy University from 2012 to 2015, Utah State University from 2015 to 2022, and the University of Louisiana at Monroe from 2023 to 2025. A native of Mobile, Alabama, Hartwell attended The Citadel.

Hartwell resigned from his position at Utah State in late 2022. He was named athletic director at the University of Louisiana at Monroe on January 26, 2023.
