= Courtney Jackson =

American football player (born 2001)

Profile
- Position: Wide receiver

Personal information
- Born: March 13, 2001 (age 25); Pittsburgh, Pennsylvania, U.S.
- Listed height: 5 ft 11 in (1.80 m)
- Listed weight: 195 lb (88 kg)

Career information
- High school: Gateway (Monroeville, Pennsylvania)
- College: Syracuse (2019–2022); Arkansas State (2023–2024)
- NFL draft: 2025: undrafted

Career history
- Denver Broncos (2025)*; Seattle Seahawks (2025)*; New York Giants (2026)*; Tennessee Titans (2026)*
- * Offseason or practice squad member only

Awards and highlights
- Super Bowl champion (LX)
- Stats at Pro Football Reference

Courtney Allen Jackson (born March 13, 2001) is an American professional football wide receiver. He played college football for the Syracuse Orange and the Arkansas State Red Wolves and was signed by the Denver Broncos as an undrafted free agent in 2025. Jackson has also been a member of the Seattle Seahawks, winning Super Bowl LX with them while on their practice squad.

== College career ==
Jackson played college football for the Syracuse Orange from 2019 to 2022 and the Arkansas State Red Wolves from 2023 to 2024. He played in 36 over four seasons at Syracuse, recording 63 catches for 662 yards. Jackson also served as the primary returner in the last four games of 2021 after an injury to Trebor Peña, returning a punt for a touchdown against Boston College. He entered the transfer portal on November 29, 2022. On December 22, 2022, Jackson committed to Arkansas State.

In 2023, Jackson caught 39 passes for 689 yards and led the team in receiving touchdowns with seven, earning him an All-Sun Belt honorable mention. He also returned 16 punts for 161 yards including a touchdown against Marshall. In 2024, he had 42 receptions for 494 yards, while also adding two punt return touchdowns, one against Tulsa and one in the 2024 68 Ventures Bowl against Bowling Green.

=== College statistics ===
Legend
**Bold**	Career high

Year	Team	Games		Receiving				Rushing			
Year	Team	GP	GS	Rec	Yds	Avg	TD	Att	Yds	Avg	TD
2019	Syracuse	1	0	1	3	3.0	0	0	0	—	0
2020	Syracuse	11	0	10	69	6.9	0	0	0	—	0
2021	Syracuse	12	7	37	389	10.5	3	**4**	**23**	**5.8**	0
2022	Syracuse	12	5	15	201	13.4	1	2	-2	-1.0	0
2023	Arkansas State	**13**	**10**	39	**689**	**17.7**	**7**	1	5	5.0	0
2024	Arkansas State	**13**	**10**	**42**	494	11.8	2	0	0	—	0
Career		62	32	144	1,845	12.8	13	7	26	3.7	0

== Professional career ==
Pre-draft measurables
Height	Weight	Arm length	Hand span	Wingspan	40-yard dash	10-yard split	20-yard split	20-yard shuttle	Three-cone drill	Vertical jump	Broad jump	Bench press
5 ft 10 in (1.78 m)	183 lb (83 kg)	30 3/4 in (0.78 m)	9 1/2 in (0.24 m)	6 ft 0 3/4 in (1.85 m)	4.38 s	1.50 s	2.59 s	4.27 s	7.02 s	33.5 in (0.85 m)	10 ft 8 in (3.25 m)	14 reps
All values from Pro Day

=== Denver Broncos ===
After not being selected in the 2025 NFL draft, Jackson signed with the Denver Broncos as an undrafted free agent. He was released on August 26, 2025, as part of final roster cut downs.

=== Seattle Seahawks ===
On August 28, 2025, the Seattle Seahawks signed Jackson to their practice squad.

=== New York Giants ===
On February 13, 2026, Jackson signed a reserve/futures contract with the New York Giants. On May 7, he was released by the Giants.

=== Tennessee Titans ===
On May 8, 2026, Jackson was claimed off waivers by the Tennessee Titans. On August 30, he was waived by the Titans as a part of final roster cuts before the start of the regular season.
