= 2025 Texas State Bobcats football team =

American college football season

2025 Texas State Bobcats football

Armed Forces Bowl champion

Armed Forces Bowl, W 41–10 vs. Rice
- Conference: Sun Belt Conference
- West Division
- Record: 7–6 (3–5 Sun Belt)
- Head coach: G. J. Kinne (3rd season)
- Offensive coordinator: Landon Keopple (1st season)
- Co-offensive coordinator: Jordan Shoemaker (1st season)
- Offensive scheme: Run and gun
- Defensive coordinator: Dexter McCoil (2nd season; regular season); Matthew Gregg (interim; bowl game)
- Co-defensive coordinator: Bradley Dale Peveto (2nd season)
- Base defense: 4–2–5
- Home stadium: UFCU Stadium

2025 Sun Belt Conference football standings
	Conf.			Overall
Team	W		L	W		L
East Division
No. 19 James Madison xy$^	8	–	0	12	–	2
Old Dominion	6	–	2	10	–	3
Coastal Carolina	5	–	3	6	–	7
Georgia Southern	4	–	4	7	–	6
Marshall	3	–	5	5	–	7
Appalachian State	2	–	6	5	–	8
Georgia State	0	–	8	1	–	11
West Division
Troy xy	6	–	2	8	–	6
Southern Miss	5	–	3	7	–	6
Louisiana	5	–	3	6	–	7
Arkansas State	5	–	3	7	–	6
Texas State	3	–	5	7	–	6
South Alabama	3	–	5	4	–	8
Louisiana–Monroe	1	–	7	3	–	9
Championship: James Madison 31, Troy 14
^ – College Football Playoff participant; $ – Conference champion; x – Division champion/co-champions; y – Championship game participant; Rankings from AP Poll

The 2025 Texas State Bobcats football team represented Texas State University in the Sun Belt Conference's West Division during the 2025 NCAA Division I FBS football season. The Bobcats were led by G. J. Kinne in his third year as the head coach. The Bobcats played home games at the UFCU Stadium, located in San Marcos, Texas.

The Bobcats started the season 3–6, with four of those losses being by seven points or less. The team won its last three games to finish the regular season at 6–6, becoming bowl eligible for the third season in a row. The Bobcats were invited to the Armed Forces Bowl, where they defeated Rice 41–10.

The 2025 season was the last the Bobcats played as members of the Sun Belt. After having turned down an invitation to join the Mountain West Conference, the Bobcats accepted an invitation to join the Pac-12 Conference for all athletic programs beginning with the 2026–27 academic year.

== Offseason ==
=== Coaching changes ===
On December 6, 2024, offensive coordinator Mack Leftwich was hired for the same position at Texas Tech. On January 16, 2025, Landon Keopple was promoted from Director of Recruiting/Assistant Quarterbacks Coach to offensive coordinator.

=== Transfers ===
==== Outgoing ====
Player	Position	Destination
Langston Anderson	WR	Abilene Christian
David Conner	OL	Andrew
Max Harris	LB	Arizona
Ismail Mahdi	RB	Arizona
Jimeto Obigbo	OL	Arizona State
Shemar Kirk	WR	Austin Peay
Kole Wilson	WR	Baylor
Tavian Coleman	DL	Colorado
Quincy Brown	WR	Florida Atlantic
PJ Hatter	QB	Georgia State
Lincoln Philyaw	QB	Houston Christian
Lars Rau	P	Illinois
Austin Samaha	TE	Incarnate Word
Brendan Franke	K	Indiana
Dominique Ratcliff	DL	Indiana
Beckham Sunderland	K	Michigan
Joshua Eaton	DB	Michigan State
Trenton Scott	OT	Nevada
Caleb Coleman	S	New Mexico
Dawson Menegatti	WR	Northern Colorado
JeCareon Lathan	DB	Northwestern State
Dylan Rhodes	WR	Northwestern State
Alex Harkey	OL	Oregon
Deven Wright	EDGE	Sacramento State
Alonzo Edwards Jr.	S	Sam Houston
Terry Webb	DL	SMU
Jaylen Boehm-Peterson	S	South Dakota
Isaac Norris	WR	Southwestern Oklahoma State
Carlos Alvarado	K	Stephen F. Austin
Gevani McCoy	QB	Temple
Mason Shipley	K	Texas
Tunmise Adeleye	DL	UNLV
Donte Thompson	DB	UTEP
Layne Horak	S	UT Permian Basin
Nathan Huerta	DL	UT Rio Grande Valley
Ben Bell	DE	Virginia Tech
Daniel Meunier	LS	West Georgia
RJ Martinez	QB	West Texas A&M
Derick Mourning	LB	Unknown
Carter Traynor	OT	Unknown
Malcolm Fields	OL	Unknown
Greg Burrell	RB	Withdrawn

==== Incoming ====
Player	Position	Previous school
Kyran Bourda	DL	Arizona State
J.P. Deeter	DL	Arizona State
Holden Geriner	QB	Auburn
Austin Turner	LS	Austin Peay
Cole Nilles	LB	Bryant
Jordan Sanders	DL	Cal Poly
Mavin Anderson	WR	California
Malik Willis	DB	Campbell
D.J. Taylor	S	Cincinnati
Tyrin Smith	WR	Cincinnati
Jaden Rios	DB	East Texas A&M
Nick Salmon	P	Florida Atlantic
TaDerius Collins	EDGE	Indiana
Kenard Snyder	DE	Iowa State
Anfernee Crease	OT	Kentucky
Ty Stamey	TE	Louisiana
Ashton Heflin	LB	Marshall
Shemar Kirk	WR	Miami (FL)
Donterry Russell	EDGE	Mississippi State
Quincy Brown	WR	Nicholls
Khamari Terrell	DB	Oregon
Gevani McCoy	QB	Oregon State
Nate Yarnell	QB	Pittsburgh
Ayden Jones	LB	Prairie View A&M
Drew Edwards	WR	Saint Anselm
David Abiara	EDGE	SMU
Keldric Luster	EDGE	SMU
Tiaquelin Mims	WR	Southern Miss
Lysander Moeolo	OL	Syracuse
Michael Nwokocha	DL	Syracuse
Michael James	K	Tarleton State
Terrence Cooks Jr.	LB	TCU
Cole Snodgrass	TE	TCU
Chantz Johnson	LB	Texas A&M
Lorenzo Johnson	WR	Texas Tech
Greg Burrell	RB	UNLV
Tyler Robles	K	USC
Chase Davis	S	Utah State
Bryce Carter	DL	Virginia
Charlie Leota	DL	West Texas A&M
Javis Mynatt	S	Wofford

== Preseason ==
=== Media poll ===
In the Sun Belt preseason coaches' poll, the Bobcats were picked to finish second in the West division and received six 1st place votes.

== Schedule ==
Date	Time	Opponent	Site	TV	Result	Attendance
August 30, 2025	7:00 p.m.	Eastern Michigan*	UFCU Stadium; San Marcos, TX	ESPN+	W 52–27	21,082
September 6	2:30 p.m.	at UTSA*	Alamodome; San Antonio, TX (I-35 Rivalry)	ESPN+	W 43–36	45,778
September 13	9:30 p.m.	at Arizona State*	Mountain America Stadium; Tempe, AZ	TNT/TruTV	L 15–34	54,005
September 20	7:00 p.m.	Nicholls*	UFCU Stadium; San Marcos, TX (Battle for the Paddle)	ESPN+	W 35–3	31,500
October 4	3:00 p.m.	at Arkansas State	Centennial Bank Stadium; Jonesboro, AR	ESPNU	L 30–31	15,841
October 11	7:00 p.m.	Troy^{†}	UFCU Stadium; San Marcos, TX	ESPN+	L 41–48 ^{OT}	24,369
October 18	2:30 p.m.	at Marshall	Joan C. Edwards Stadium; Huntington, WV	ESPN+	L 37–40 ^{2OT}	27,533
October 28	7:00 p.m.	James Madison	UFCU Stadium; San Marcos, TX	ESPN2	L 20–52	17,363
November 8	4:00 p.m.	at Louisiana	Cajun Field; Lafayette, LA	ESPN+	L 39–42	14,231
November 15	2:30 p.m.	at Southern Miss	M. M. Roberts Stadium; Hattiesburg, MS	ESPN+	W 41–14	27,223
November 22	4:00 p.m.	Louisiana–Monroe	UFCU Stadium; San Marcos, TX	ESPN+	W 31–14	17,078
November 29	2:00 p.m.	South Alabama	UFCU Stadium; San Marcos, TX	ESPN+	W 49–26	16,169
January 2, 2026	12:00 p.m.	vs. Rice*	Amon G. Carter Stadium; Fort Worth, TX (Armed Forces Bowl)	ESPN	W 41–10	28,243
*Non-conference game; ^{†}Homecoming; All times are in Central time

== Personnel ==
2025 Texas State Bobcats football team roster
Players
Coaches
Offense

Pos.	#	Name	Class
WR	0	Tiaquelin Mims	Jr
WR	1	Chris Dawn Jr.	Jr
WR	2	Kylen Evans	So
WR	3	Mavin Anderson	Sr
RB	4	Torrance Burgess Jr.	Sr
RB	5	Jaylen Jenkins	Jr
QB	6	Keldric Luster	So
RB	7	Lincoln Pare	Sr
QB	8	Brad Jackson	Fr
RB	9	Greg Burrell	So
WR	10	Tyrin Smith	Sr
WR	11	Beau Sparks	Jr
WR	12	Lorenzo Johnson Jr.	Fr
QB	13	Holden Geriner	Jr
WR	14	Jordan Martin	Fr
TE	16	Blake Smith	Jr
QB	17	Gavin Parkhurst	Fr
TE	18	Ty Stamey	So
QB	19	Nate Yarnell	Sr
RB	21	Cole Pryor	Fr
WR	24	Caleb Carter	Fr
RB	26	Bradley Sowersby	Fr
WR	29	Drew Edwards	Sr
OL	51	Brock Riker	Fr
OL	52	Ezra Dotson-Oyetade	Jr
OL	53	Cameron Schultz	Jr
OL	54	Tyler Norris	Fr
OL	57	Ian Langford	Jr
OL	63	Aidin Rhodes	So
OL	64	Dorion Strawn	Sr
OL	65	Emeka Obigbo	Sr
OL	66	Justin DeLeon	So
OL	67	Preston Ward	Fr
OL	68	Sully Burns	So
OL	70	Ameer Ross	Fr
OL	71	Lysander Moeolo	Sr
OL	72	Kirk Gildon	Fr
OL	74	Tellek Lockette	Sr
OL	75	Bami Badusi	So
OL	78	Anfernee Crease	Jr
OL	79	Alan Grimme	Jr
TE	80	Jake Simpson	So
WR	81	Julius Spencer	Fr
TE	82	Arvis Battle	Fr
WR	83	Jonah Jones	Fr
WR	85	Skylar Lewis	Fr
TE	86	Titus Lyons	Sr
WR	88	Tucker Cusano	Fr
TE	89	Jordan Williams	Fr
OL	93	Zephaniah Amosa	So

Defense

Pos.	#	Name	Class
DE	0	Tymere Jackson	Sr
S	1	Bobby Crosby	Sr
DE	2	Kalil Alexander	Sr
LB	3	Michael Boudoin III	Sr
CB	4	Khamari Terrell	Jr
S	5	Darius Jackson	Jr
DE	6	Jo'Laison Landry	So
DT	8	Kamren Washington	Jr
CB	9	Jaden Rios	Sr
S	10	Javis Mynatt	Jr
CB	11	Canden Grogan	Sr
DE	12	Kenard Snyder	Sr
DL	13	Michael Nwokocha	Sr
S	14	Ryan Nolan	Jr
ATH	15	Donterry Russell	Jr
LB	16	Terrence Cooks Jr.	Sr
CB	17	Christopher Jones	Fr
CB	18	Craig Royal	Jr
LB	19	Ashton Heflin	So
S	22	Will Mitchell	So
CB	23	Amarion Atwood	So
CB	24	Trez Moore	Sr
DB	25	DJ Taylor	Sr
S	26	Chase Davis	So
CB	27	Cordarian Powell	Fr
S	28	Tice Williams	Fr
LB	29	Treylin Payne	Sr
DL	32	Javarius Bell	Fr
DE	33	Blake Isbell	Fr
DE	34	Jermy Jackson Jr.	Fr
LB	35	Chantz Johnson	So
CB	36	Greg Gipson	Fr
CB	37	Malik Willis	So
DL	40	Simeon Garner	Fr
DL	41	D'Ante Keys	Fr
LB	42	Colt Sparks	Fr
LB	44	Karson Kaiser	Jr
LB	45	Cole Nilles	So
LB	46	Ayden Jones	So
LB	46	Ja'Mari Laye	Fr
LB	49	Blaine Carver	Fr
DT	50	Nick Johnson	So
LB	56	TJ Burkhalter	Fr
DL	88	Jordan Sanders	Jr
DL	90	Kyran Bourda	So
DL	91	J.P. Deeter	So
DL	96	Bryce Carter	Sr
DL	97	Devarrick Woods	Jr
DL	98	Charlie Leota	Sr
DT	99	Amipeleasi Langi Jr.	Sr

Special teams

Pos.	#	Name	Class
P	33	Nick Salmon	Jr
P	38	David Nunez	Sr
K	41	Jacob Bonilla	So
K	43	Michael James	So
LS	47	Darian Snell	Fr
LS	48	Austin Turner	Sr
K	95	Tyler Robles	So

Head coach

- G. J. Kinne

Coordinators/assistant coaches

- Landon Keopple (offensive coordinator)
- Dexter McCoil, Sr. (defensive coordinator)
- Tanner Burns (special teams/associate head coach/defensive assistant)
- Jordan Shoemaker (co-offensive coordinator/offensive line)
- Bradley Dale Peveto (co-defensive coordinator/linebackers)
- Will Bryant (tight ends/passing game)
- Matthew Gregg (cornerbacks/defensive recruiting)
- Randy Martinez (wide receivers)
- Barrick Nealy (running backs)
- Mike O'Guin (defensive line)

Legend

- (C) Team captain
- (S) Suspended
- (I) Ineligible
- Injured
- Redshirt

Roster
Last update: June 28, 2025

=== Staff ===
Name	Position	Consecutive season at Texas State in current position
G. J. Kinne	Head coach	3rd
Landon Keopple	Offensive coordinator	1st
Dexter McCoil, Sr.	Defensive coordinator	2nd as DC; 3rd overall
Tanner Burns	Special teams/associate head coach/defensive assistant	1st
Jordan Shoemaker	Co-offensive coordinator/offensive line	3rd
Bradley Dale Peveto	Co-defensive coordinator/linebackers	2nd
Will Bryant	Tight ends/passing game	3rd
Matthew Gregg	Cornerbacks/defensive recruiting	3rd
Randy Martinez	Wide receivers	1st
Barrick Nealy	Running backs	2nd
Mike O'Guin	Defensive line	3rd

== Game summaries ==
=== Eastern Michigan ===
Eastern Michigan Eagles (0–0) at Texas State Bobcats (0–0) – Game summary

Quarter	1	2	3	4	Total
Eagles	3	14	0	10	27
Bobcats	14	10	14	14	52

at UFCU Stadium, San Marcos, Texas

- Date: August 30
- Game time: 7:00 p.m. CDT
- Game weather: Sunny, 92 °F (33 °C)
- Game attendance: 21,082
- Referee: Jeremy Parker
- TV announcers (ESPN+): Brant Freeman (play-by-play) and Bill Culhane (analyst)
- Box score, Recap

Game information
First quarter
- (13:19) TXST – Beau Sparks 16-yard pass from Brad Jackson, Tyler Robles kick (Drive: 4 plays, 75 yards, 1:41; Texas State 7–0)
- (8:47) EMU – Rudy Kessinger 24-yard field goal (Drive: 9 plays, 68 yards, 4:32; Texas State 7–3)
- (6:41) TXST – Beau Sparks 15-yard pass from Brad Jackson, Tyler Robles kick (Drive: 6 plays, 75 yards, 2:06; Texas State 14–3)

Second quarter

- (13:33) EMU – Tavierre Dunlap 2-yard run, Rudy Kessinger kick (Drive: 8 plays, 80 yards, 3:24; Texas State 14–10)
- (8:39) TXST – Tyler Robles 24-yard field goal (Drive: 12 plays, 68 yards, 4:54; Texas State 17–10)
- (3:56) TXST – Lincoln Pare 22-yard run, Tyler Robles kick (Drive: 5 plays, 92 yards, 3:00; Texas State 24–10)
- (0:12) EMU – Joshua Long 16-yard pass from Noah Kim, Rudy Kessinger kick (Drive: 11 plays, 65 yards, 3:44; Texas State 24–17)

Third quarter

- (7:18) TXST – Beau Sparks 3-yard pass from Brad Jackson, Tyler Robles kick (Drive: 10 plays, 80 yards, 4:58; Texas State 31–17)
- (0:19) TXST – Beau Sparks 5-yard pass from Brad Jackson, Tyler Robles kick (Drive: 9 plays, 66 yards, 5:23; Texas State 38–17)

Fourth quarter

- (12:19) TXST – Greg Burrell 15-yard run, Tyler Robles kick (Drive: 5 plays, 35 yards, 2:19; Texas State 45–17)
- (6:29) EMU – Rudy Kessinger 37-yard field goal (Drive: 10 plays, 56 yards, 5:50; Texas State 45–20)
- (4:02) TXST – Jaylen Jenkins 58-yard run, Tyler Robles kick (Drive: 5 plays, 74 yards, 2:25; Texas State 52–20)
- (0:41) EMU – Joey Mattord 7-yard run, Rudy Kessinger kick (Drive: 13 plays, 75 yards, 3:21; Texas State 52–27)

Statistics	EMU	TXST
First downs	23	30
Plays–yards	67–391	66–606
Rushes–yards	33–143	39–392
Passing yards	248	214
Passing: Comp–Att–Int	23–34–0	18–27–0
Turnovers	0	0
Time of possession	29:02	30:58

Team	Category	Player	Statistics
Eastern Michigan	Passing	Noah Kim	23/34, 248 yards, TD
Eastern Michigan	Rushing	Dontae McMillan	9 carries, 78 yards
Eastern Michigan	Receiving	Terry Lockett Jr.	5 receptions, 62 yards
Texas State	Passing	Brad Jackson	18/26, 214 yards, 4 TD
Texas State	Rushing	Lincoln Pare	12 carries, 167 yards, TD
Texas State	Receiving	Beau Sparks	7 receptions, 82 yards, 4 TD

=== At UTSA (rivalry) ===
Texas State Bobcats (1–0) at UTSA Roadrunners (0–1) – Game summary

Quarter	1	2	3	4	Total
Bobcats	2	17	10	14	43
Roadrunners	0	14	14	8	36

at Alamodome, San Antonio, Texas

- Date: September 6
- Game time: 2:30 p.m. CDT
- Game weather: None (played indoors)
- Game attendance: 45,778
- Referee: Charles Lamertina
- TV announcers (ESPN+): Jack Benjamin (play-by-play) and LaDarrin McLane (analyst)
- Box score, Recap

Game information

First quarter

- (12:19) TXST – Team Safety (Drive: 4 plays, -27 yards, 1:10; Texas State 2–0)

Second quarter

- (12:10) TXST – Lincoln Pare 1-yard run, Tyler Robles kick (Drive: 10 plays, 95 yards, 4:22; Texas State 9–0)
- (9:02) UTSA – A'Marion Peterson 1-yard run, Michael Petro kick (Drive: 8 plays, 75 yards, 3:08; Texas State 9–7)
- (4:04) TXST – Brad Jackson 9-yard run, Tyler Robles kick (Drive: 5 plays, 64 yards, 2:34; Texas State 16–7)
- (0:37) UTSA – DJ Allen Jr. 1-yard pass from Owen McCown, Michael Petro kick (Drive: 8 plays, 65 yards, 3:20; Texas State 16–14)
- (0:00) TXST – Tyler Robles 50-yard field goal (Drive: 7 plays, 41 yards, 0:37; Texas State 19–14)

Third quarter

- (14:44) UTSA – Robert Henry Jr. 75-yard run, Michael Petro kick (Drive: 2 plays, 75 yards, 0:16; UTSA 21–19)
- (11:35) TXST – Jaylen Jenkins 17-yard run, Tyler Robles kick (Drive: 7 plays, 75 yards, 3:09; Texas State 26–21)
- (7:36) UTSA – Robert Henry Jr. 4-yard pass from Owen McCown, Michael Petro kick (Drive: 9 plays, 70 yards, 3:59; UTSA 28–26)
- (4:24) TXST – Tyler Robles 38-yard field goal (Drive: 6 plays, 60 yards, 3:06; Texas State 29–28)

Fourth quarter

- (14:11) TXST – Brad Jackson 6-yard run, Tyler Robles kick (Drive: 6 plays, 57 yards, 2:46; Texas State 36–28)
- (10:22) UTSA – Robert Henry Jr. 30-yard run, Devin McCuin two-point conversion pass from Owen McCown (Drive: 8 plays, 75 yards, 3:49; Tied 36–36)
- (10:08) TXST – Beau Sparks 65-yard pass from Brad Jackson, Tyler Robles kick (Drive: 1 play, 65 yards, 0:08; Texas State 43–36)

Statistics	TXST	UTSA
First downs	17	25
Plays–yards	66–454	77–464
Rushes–yards	46–168	34–245
Passing yards	286	219
Passing: comp–att–int	12–20–1	23–43–0
Turnovers	1	0
Time of possession	29:37	30:23

Team	Category	Player	Statistics
Texas State	Passing	Brad Jackson	12/20, 286 yards, TD, INT
Texas State	Rushing	Lincoln Pare	21 carries, 71 yards, TD
Texas State	Receiving	Beau Sparks	5 receptions, 155 yards, TD
UTSA	Passing	Owen McCown	23/43, 219 yards, 2 TD
UTSA	Rushing	Robert Henry Jr.	17 carries, 159 yards, 2 TD
UTSA	Receiving	Devin McCuin	5 receptions, 83 yards

=== At Arizona State ===
Texas State Bobcats (2–0) at Arizona State Sun Devils (1–1) – Game summary

Quarter	1	2	3	4	Total
Bobcats	3	0	6	6	15
Sun Devils	3	17	14	0	34

at Mountain America Stadium, Tempe, Arizona

- Date: September 13
- Game time: 9:30 p.m. CDT/7:30 p.m. MST
- Game weather: Sunny, 94 °F (34 °C)
- Game attendance: 54,005
- Referee: Scott Broadway
- TV announcers (TNT): J. B. Long (play-by-play), Mike Golic Jr. (analyst) and Coy Wire (sideline)
- Box score, Recap

Game information

First quarter

- ASU – Jesus Gomez 47-yard field goal, 6:40. Sun Devils 3–0. Drive: 5 plays, 39 yards, 2:19.
- TXST – Tyler Robles 39-yard field goal, 2:16. Tied 3–3. Drive: 13 plays, 54 yards, 4:24.

Second quarter

- ASU – Jordyn Tyson 30-yard pass from Sam Leavitt (Jesus Gomez kick), 12:47. Sun Devils 10–3. Drive: 10 plays, 75 yards, 4:29.
- ASU – Sam Leavitt 1-yard run (Jesus Gomez kick), 10:22. Sun Devils 17–3. Drive: 4 plays, 25 yards, 1:44.
- ASU – Jesus Gomez 26-yard field goal, 2:44. Sun Devils 20–3. Drive: 11 plays, 56 yards, 3:55.

Third quarter

- ASU – Chamon Metayer 27-yard pass from Sam Leavitt (Jesus Gomez kick), 8:35. Sun Devils 27–3. Drive: 13 plays, 79 yards, 6:12.
- TXST – Brad Jackson 7-yard run (pass failed), 2:29. Sun Devils 27–9. Drive: 15 plays, 59 yards, 5:59.
- ASU – Raleek Brown 75-yard run (Jesus Gomez kick), 2:17. Sun Devils 34–9. Drive: 1 play, 75 yards, 0:12.

Fourth quarter

- TXST – Kylen Evans 3-yard pass from Brad Jackson (pass failed), 5:26. Sun Devils 34–15. Drive: 14 plays, 51 yards, 5:18.

Statistics	TXST	ASU
First downs	21	21
Plays–yards	78–303	67–433
Rushes–yards	42–119	42–245
Passing yards	184	188
Passing: comp–att–int	25–36–0	15–25–0
Turnovers	2	0
Time of possession	29:17	30:43

Team	Category	Player	Statistics
Texas State	Passing	Brad Jackson	25/36, 184 yards, TD
Texas State	Rushing	Lincoln Pare	13 carries, 61 yards
Texas State	Receiving	Beau Sparks	10 receptions, 70 yards
Arizona State	Passing	Sam Leavitt	15/25, 188 yards, 2 TD
Arizona State	Rushing	Raleek Brown	12 carries, 144 yards, TD
Arizona State	Receiving	Jordyn Tyson	6 receptions, 105 yards, TD

=== Nicholls (FCS, Battle for the Paddle) ===
Nicholls Colonels (FCS) (1–2) at Texas State Bobcats (2–1) – Game summary

Quarter	1	2	3	4	Total
Colonels (FCS)	3	0	0	0	3
Bobcats	7	21	7	0	35

at UFCU Stadium, San Marcos, Texas

- Date: September 20
- Game time: 7:00 p.m. CDT
- Game weather: Cloudy
- Game attendance: 31,500
- Referee: Marshall Lewis
- TV announcers (ESPN+): Brant Freeman (play-by-play) and Keith Moreland (analyst)
- Box score, Recap

Game information

First quarter

- (9:15) TXST – Brad Jackson 9-yard run, Tyler Robles kick (Drive: 13 plays, 92 yards, 5:32; Texas State 7–0)
- (1:52) NICH – Gabriel Showalter 32-yard field goal (Drive: 13 plays, 60 yards, 7:23; Texas State 7–3)

Second quarter

- (14:17) TXST – Brad Jackson 4-yard run, Tyler Robles kick (Drive: 6 plays, 44 yards, 2:34; Texas State 14–3)
- (8:33) TXST – Torrance Burgess Jr. 7-yard run, Tyler Robles kick (Drive: 8 plays, 92 yards, 3:34; Texas State 21–3)
- (2:17) TXST – Lincoln Pare 9-yard run, Tyler Robles kick (Drive: 12 plays, 85 yards, 3:22; Texas State 28–3)

Third quarter

- (2:38) TXST – Greg Burrell 5-yard run, Tyler Robles kick (Drive: 11 plays, 46 yards, 4:30; Texas State 35–3)

Fourth quarter

- No scoring plays.

Statistics	NICH	TXST
First downs	17	25
Plays–yards	64–224	69–401
Rushes–yards	42–127	47–207
Passing yards	97	194
Passing: comp–att–int	15–22–1	14–22–0
Turnovers	1	1
Time of possession	33:09	26:51

Team	Category	Player	Statistics
Nicholls	Passing	Deuce Hogan	15/21, 97 yards, INT
Nicholls	Rushing	Miequle Brock Jr.	11 carries, 59 yards
Nicholls	Receiving	Miequle Brock Jr.	6 receptions, 36 yards
Texas State	Passing	Brad Jackson	13/20, 180 yards
Texas State	Rushing	Lincoln Pare	15 carries, 64 yards, TD
Texas State	Receiving	Kylen Evans	4 receptions, 88 yards

=== At Arkansas State ===
Texas State Bobcats (3–1) at Arkansas State Red Wolves (1–4) – Game summary

Quarter	1	2	3	4	Total
Bobcats	7	3	0	20	30
Red Wolves	7	3	0	21	31

at Centennial Bank Stadium, Jonesboro, Arkansas

- Date: October 4
- Game time: 3:00 p.m. CDT
- Game weather: Sunny, 83 °F (28 °C)
- Game attendance: 15,841
- Referee: Jeremy Parker
- TV announcers (ESPNU): Chuckie Kempf (play-by-play) and Darius Walker (analyst)
- Box score, Recap

Game information

First quarter

- (13:01) TXST – Brad Jackson 24-yard run, Tyler Robles kick (Drive: 7 plays, 75 yards, 1:59; Arkansas State 7–0)
- (2:04) ARST – Jaylen Raynor 13-yard run, Clune Van Andel kick (Drive: 7 plays, 80 yards, 1:58; Tied 7–7)

Second quarter

- (10:29) ARST – Clune Van Andel 51-yard field goal (Drive: 6 plays, 21 yards, 3:06; Arkansas State 10–7)
- (5:48) TXST – Tyler Robles 31-yard field goal (Drive: 12 plays, 75 yards, 4:41; Tied 10–10)

Third quarter

- No scoring plays.

Fourth quarter

- (12:05) TXST – Titus Lyons 13-yard pass from Brad Jackson, Tyler Robles kick (Drive: 9 plays, 89 yards, 3:01; Texas State 17–10)
- (6:40) ARST – Hunter Summers 5-yard pass from Jaylen Raynor, Clune Van Andel kick (Drive: 11 plays, 75 yards, 5:25; Tied 17–17)
- (3:45) TXST – Lincoln Pare 6-yard run, Tyler Robles kick (Drive: 7 plays, 75 yards, 2:55; Texas State 24–17)
- (1:20) ARST – Kenyon Clay 5-yard pass from Jaylen Raynor, Clune Van Andel kick (Drive: 9 plays, 80 yards, 2:20; Tied 24–24)
- (1:00) TXST – Lincoln Pare 3-yard run, Tyler Robles PAT failed (Drive: 2 plays, 66 yards, 0:15; Texas State 30–24)
- (0:07) ARST – Jaylen Raynor 4-yard run, Clune Van Andel kick (Drive: 6 plays, 75 yards, 0:53; Arkansas State 31–30)

Statistics	TXST	ARST
First downs	23	22
Plays–yards	72–521	69–398
Rushes–yards	46–289	34–150
Passing yards	232	248
Passing: comp–att–int	18–26–0	27–35–0
Turnovers	0	0
Time of possession	30:13	29:47

Team	Category	Player	Statistics
Texas State	Passing	Brad Jackson	18/26, 230 yards, TD
Texas State	Rushing	Brad Jackson	10 carries, 131 yards, TD
Texas State	Receiving	Beau Sparks	3 receptions, 58 yards
Arkansas State	Passing	Jaylen Raynor	27/35, 248 yards, 2 TD
Arkansas State	Rushing	Jaylen Raynor	19 carries, 92 yards, 2 TD
Arkansas State	Receiving	Corey Rucker	8 receptions, 102 yards

=== Troy ===
Troy Trojans (3–2) at Texas State Bobcats (3–2) – Game summary

Quarter	1	2	3	4	OT	Total
Trojans	7	10	10	14	7	48
Bobcats	28	3	7	3	0	41

at UFCU Stadium, San Marcos, Texas

- Date: October 11
- Game time: 7:00 p.m. CDT
- Game weather: Sunny
- Game attendance: 24,369
- Referee: Marshall Lewis
- TV announcers (ESPN+): Brant Freeman (play-by-play) and Keith Moreland (analyst)
- Box score, Recap

Game information

First quarter

- (11:56) TXST – Brad Jackson 8-yard run, Tyler Robles kick (Drive: 8 plays, 55 yards, 2:57; Texas State 7–0)
- (9:20) TXST – Greg Burrell 59-yard run, Tyler Robles kick (Drive: 4 plays, 80 yards, 0:55; Texas State 14–0)
- (2:29) TXST – Lincoln Pare 7-yard run, Tyler Robles kick (Drive: 13 plays, 70 yards, 6:00; Texas State 21–0)
- (1:12) TROY – Rara Thomas 57-yard pass from Tucker Kilcrease, Scott Taylor Renfroe kick (Drive: 3 plays, 75 yards, 1:17; Texas State 21–7)
- (0:08) TXST – Lincoln Pare 62-yard run, Tyler Robles kick (Drive: 3 plays, 71 yards, 0:58; Texas State 28–7)

Second quarter

- (7:34) TROY – Jackson Worley 6-yard pass from Tucker Kilcrease, Scott Taylor Renfroe kick (Drive: 15 plays, 75 yards, 7:34; Texas State 28–14)
- (2:35) TXST – Tyler Robles 42-yard field goal (Drive: 11 plays, 68 yards, 4:53; Texas State 31–14)
- (0:00) TROY – Paddy McAteer 53-yard field goal (Drive: 8 plays, 30 yards, 1:11; Texas State 31–17)

Third quarter

- (11:27) TROY – Jarris Williams 2-yard run, Scott Taylor Renfroe kick (Drive: 7 plays, 75 yards, 3:33; Texas State 31–24)
- (8:03) TROY – Scott Taylor Renfroe 47-yard field goal (Drive: 6 plays, 30 yards, 3:23; Texas State 31–27)
- (3:45) TXST – Lincoln Pare 1-yard run, Tyler Robles kick (Drive: 10 plays, 70 yards, 4:12; Texas State 38–27)

Fourth quarter

- (12:45) TROY – Trae Swartz 2-yard pass from Tucker Kilcrease, two-point conversion run attempt failed (Drive: 13 plays, 75 yards, 6:00; Texas State 38–33)
- (3:55) TXST – Tyler Robles 37-yard field goal (Drive: 16 plays, 66 yards, 8:45; Texas State 41–33)
- (1:13) TROY – DJ Epps 18-yard pass from Tucker Kilcrease, Tucker Kilcrease two-point conversion pass to DJ Epps (Drive: 9 plays, 75 yards, 2:42; Tied 41–41)

Overtime

- TROY – DJ Epps 6-yard pass from Tucker Kilcrease, Scott Taylor Renfroe kick (Drive: 5 plays, 25 yards; Troy 48–41)

Statistics	TROY	TXST
First downs	27	21
Plays–yards	73–458	75–574
Rushes–yards	32–43	53–326
Passing yards	415	248
Passing: Comp–Att–Int	30–41–0	19–22–0
Turnovers	0	0
Time of possession	28:59	31:01

Team	Category	Player	Statistics
Troy	Passing	Tucker Kilcrease	30/39, 415 yards, 5 TD
Troy	Rushing	Tray Taylor	2 carries, 18 yards
Troy	Receiving	DJ Epps	10 receptions, 148 yards, 2 TD
Texas State	Passing	Brad Jackson	19/22, 248 yards
Texas State	Rushing	Greg Burrell	13 carries, 136 yards, TD
Texas State	Receiving	Chris Dawn Jr.	7 receptions, 119 yards

=== At Marshall ===
Texas State Bobcats (3–3) at Marshall Thundering Herd (3–3) – Game summary

Quarter	1	2	3	4	OT	2OT	Total
Bobcats	7	10	0	10	7	3	37
Thundering Herd	7	6	3	11	7	6	40

at Joan C. Edwards Stadium • Huntington, West Virginia

- Date: October 18
- Game time: 2:30 p.m. CDT
- Game weather: Sunny
- Game attendance: 27,533
- Referee: Tim Barker
- TV announcers (ESPN+): Keith Morehouse (play-by-play), Mark Martin (analyst) and Ben Westfall (sideline)
- Box score, Recap

Game information

First quarter

- (14:31) TXST – Brad Jackson 1-yard run, Tyler Robles kick (Drive: 4 plays, 75 yards, 0:29; Texas State 7–0)
- (10:01) MRSH – Antwan Roberts 5-yard run, Lorcan Quinn kick (Drive: 3 plays, 14 yards, 1:07; Tied 7–7)

Second quarter

- (14:15) MRSH – Lorcan Quinn 24-yard field goal (Drive: 7 plays, 60 yards, 3:26; Marshall 10–7)
- (7:55) TXST – Tyler Robles 23-yard field goal (Drive: 7 plays, 76 yards, 2:38; Tied 10–10)
- (3:42) MRSH – Lorcan Quinn 48-yard field goal (Drive: 10 plays, 39 yards, 4:13; Marshall 13–10)
- (1:22) TXST – Titis Lyons 2-yard pass from Brad Jackson, Tyler Robles kick (Drive: 5 plays, 76 yards, 2:20; Texas State 17–13)

Third quarter

- (0:39) MRSH – Lorcan Quinn 31-yard field goal (Drive: 7 plays, 67 yards, 3:01; Texas State 17–16)

Fourth quarter

- (14:45) TXST – Beau Sparks 73-yard pass from Brad Jackson, Tyler Robles kick (Drive: 3 plays, 75 yards, 0:54; Texas State 24–16)
- (6:08) MRSH – Lorcan Quinn 23-yard field goal (Drive: 7 plays, 26 yards, 2:45; Texas State 24–19)
- (1:14) MRSH – Adrian Norton 21-yard pass from Carlos Del Rio-Wilson, Demarcus Lacey run (Drive: 5 plays, 53 yards, 0:59; Marshall 27–24)
- (0:00) TXST – Tyler Robles 50-yard field goal (Drive: 11 plays, 43 yards, 1:14; Tied 27–27)

First overtime

- MRSH – Jo'Shon Barbie 4-yard run, Lorcan Quinn kick (Drive: 4 plays, 25 yards; Marshall 34–27)
- TXST – Lincoln Pare 1-yard run, Tyler Robles kick (Drive: 7 plays, 25 yards; Tied 34–34)

Second overtime

- TXST – Tyler Robles 29-yard field goal (Drive: 7 plays, 14 yards; Texas State 37–34)
- MRSH – Jo'Shon Barbie 1-yard run (Drive: 7 plays, 25 yards; Marshall 40–37)

Statistics	TXST	MRSH
First downs	20	27
Plays–yards	83–558	81–466
Rushes–yards	44–114	48–186
Passing yards	444	280
Passing: Comp–Att–Int	26–39–1	23–33–1
Turnovers	3	1
Time of possession	27:17	32:43

Team	Category	Player	Statistics
Texas State	Passing	Brad Jackson	26/38, 444 yards, 2 TD, INT
Texas State	Rushing	Brad Jackson	19 carries, 48 yards, TD
Texas State	Receiving	Chris Dawn Jr.	5 reception, 180 yards
Marshall	Passing	Carlos Del Rio-Wilson	22/32, 277 yards, TD, INT
Marshall	Rushing	Carlos Del Rio-Wilson	17 carries, 88 yards
Marshall	Receiving	Demarcus Lacey	7 receptions, 88 yards

=== James Madison ===
James Madison Dukes (6–1) at Texas State Bobcats (3–4) – Game summary

Quarter	1	2	3	4	Total
Dukes	14	14	21	3	52
Bobcats	0	20	0	0	20

at UFCU Stadium, San Marcos, Texas

- Date: October 28
- Game time: 7:00 p.m. CDT
- Game weather: Sunny, 71 °F (22 °C)
- Game attendance: 17,363
- Referee: Yvette Matchette
- TV announcers (ESPN2): Jay Alter (play-by-play) and Rocky Boiman (analyst)
- Box score, Recap

Game information

First quarter

- (7:49) JMU – Nick DeGennaro 6-yard pass from Alonza Barnett III, Morgan Suarez kick (Drive: 6 plays, 50 yards, 3:41; James Madison 7–0)
- (4:16) JMU – Jordan Fuller 8-yard run, Morgan Suarez kick (Drive: 2 plays, 65 yards, 0:49; James Madison 14–0)

Second quarter

- (14:34) TXST – Mavin Anderson 14-yard pass from Brad Jackson, Tyler Robles kick (Drive: 4 plays, 24 yards, 1:11; James Madison 14–7)
- (9:45) JMU – Jordan Fuller 3-yard run, Morgan Suarez kick (Drive: 9 plays, 75 yards, 4:49; James Madison 21–7)
- (6:00) TXST – Tyler Robles 35-yard field goal (Drive: 10 plays, 57 yards, 3:45; James Madison 21–10)
- (4:45) JMU – Josh Phifer 14-yard pass from Alonza Barnett III, Morgan Suarez kick (Drive: 3 plays, 75 yards, 1:15; James Madison 28–10)
- (1:37) TXST – Brad Jackson 3-yard run, Tyler Robles kick (Drive: 11 plays, 75 yards, 3:02; James Madison 28–17)
- (0:04) TXST – Tyler Robles 36-yard field goal (Drive: 7 plays, 55 yards, 0:41; James Madison 28–20)

Third quarter

- (14:13) JMU – Nick DeGennaro 76-yard pass from Alonza Barnett III, Morgan Suarez kick (Drive: 2 plays, 75 yards, 0:47; James Madison 35–20)
- (9:50) JMU – Logan Kyle 5-yard pass from Alonza Barnett III, Morgan Suarez kick (Drive: 6 plays, 25 yards, 3:02; James Madison 42–20)
- (6:43) JMU – Alonza Barnett III 2-yard run, Morgan Suarez kick (Drive: 6 plays, 35 yards, 2:28; James Madison 49–20)

Fourth quarter

- (13:27) JMU – Morgan Suarez 31-yard field goal (Drive: 10 plays, 41 yards, 6:44; James Madison 52–20)

Statistics	JMU	TXST
First downs	22	20
Plays–yards	60–511	75–352
Rushes–yards	41–247	40–122
Passing yards	264	230
Passing: Comp–Att–Int	12–19–1	18–35–3
Turnovers	1	3
Time of possession	32:30	27:30

Team	Category	Player	Statistics
James Madison	Passing	Alonza Barnett	12/18, 264 yards, 4 TD, INT
James Madison	Rushing	Alonza Barnett	10 carries, 98 yards, TD
James Madison	Receiving	Nick DeGennaro	3 receptions, 101 yards, 2 TD
Texas State	Passing	Brad Jackson	18/32, 230 yards, TD, 3 INT
Texas State	Rushing	Brad Jackson	16 carries, 43 yards, TD
Texas State	Receiving	Mavin Anderson	5 receptions, 96 yards, TD

=== At Louisiana ===
Texas State Bobcats (3–5) at Louisiana Ragin' Cajuns (3–6) – Game summary

Quarter	1	2	3	4	Total
Bobcats	10	7	3	19	39
Ragin' Cajuns	7	28	0	7	42

at Cajun Field, Lafayette, Louisiana

- Date: November 8
- Game time: 4:00 p.m. CST
- Game weather: Sunny, 83 °F (28 °C)
- Game attendance: 14,231
- Referee: Brandon Kirkland
- TV announcers (ESPN+): Dan McDonald (play-by-play), Eric Mouton (analyst) and Ben Schafer (sideline)
- Box score, Recap

Game information

First quarter

- (8:06) LA – Shelton Simpson Jr. 10-yard pass from Lunch Winfield, Tony Sterner kick (Drive: 10 plays, 80 yards, 4:53; Louisiana 7–0)
- (4:45) TXST – Tyler Robles 25-yard field goal (Drive: 7 plays, 61 yards, 3:21; Louisiana 7–3)
- (0:27) TXST – Lincoln Pare 54-yard run, Tyler Robles kick (Drive: 3 plays, 69 yards, 1:12; Texas State 10–7)

Second quarter

- (11:24) LA – Caden Jensen 27-yard pass from Lunch Winfield, Tony Sterner kick (Drive: 10 plays, 94 yards, 3:59; Louisiana 14–10)
- (8:29) LA – Bill Davis 12-yard run, Tony Sterner kick (Drive: 4 plays, 25 yards, 1:46; Louisiana 21–10)
- (5:36) LA – Shelton Sampson Jr. 12-yard pass from Lunch Winfield, Tony Sterner kick (Drive: 3 plays, 17 yards, 1:22; Louisiana 28–10)
- (4:26) TXST – Titus Lyons 24-yard pass from Brad Jackson, Tyler Robles kick (Drive: 5 plays, 77 yards, 1:04; Louisiana 28–17)
- (0:21) LA – Lunch Winfield 1-yard run, Tony Sterner kick (Drive: 10 plays, 64 yards, 3:55; Louisiana 35–17)

Third quarter

- (2:57) TXST – Tyler Robles 24-yard field goal (Drive: 12 plays, 67 yards, 4:20; Louisiana 35–20)

Fourth quarter

- (13:02) LA – Lunch Winfield 3-yard run, Tony Sterner kick (Drive: 9 plays, 51 yards, 4:53; Louisiana 42–20)
- (12:05) TXST – Beau Sparks 49-yard run, two-point conversion pass failed (Drive: 4 plays, 70 yards, 0:49; Louisiana 42–26)
- (8:19) TXST – Beau Sparks 38-yard pass from Brad Jackson, two-point conversion run failed (Drive: 1 play, 38 yards, 0:09; Louisiana 42–32)
- (3:12) TXST – Chris Dawn Jr. 21-yard pass from Brad Jackson, Tyler Robles kick (Drive: 8 plays, 65 yards, 3:16; Louisiana 42–39)

Statistics	TXST	LA
First downs	22	27
Plays–yards	57–528	79–384
Rushes–yards	24–168	52–192
Passing yards	360	192
Passing: Comp–Att–Int	26–33–1	17–27–2
Turnovers	2	2
Time of possession	22:02	37:58

Team	Category	Player	Statistics
Texas State	Passing	Brad Jackson	26/33, 360 yards, 3 TD, INT
Texas State	Rushing	Lincoln Pare	10 carries, 89 yards, TD
Texas State	Receiving	Beau Sparks	10 receptions, 186 yards, TD
Louisiana	Passing	Lunch Winfield	17/27, 192 yards, 3 TD, 2 INT
Louisiana	Rushing	Bill Davis	18 carries, 87 yards, TD
Louisiana	Receiving	Shelton Sampson Jr.	5 receptions, 80 yards, 2 TD

=== At Southern Miss ===
Texas State Bobcats (3–6) at Southern Miss Golden Eagles (7–2) – Game summary

Quarter	1	2	3	4	Total
Bobcats	10	17	0	14	41
Golden Eagles	0	0	7	7	14

at M. M. Roberts Stadium, Hattiesburg, Mississippi

- Date: November 15
- Game time: 2:30 p.m. CST
- Game weather: Sunny • Temperature: 75 °F (24 °C) • Wind: SW 5 mph
- Game attendance: 27,223
- Referee: Tim Barker
- TV announcers (ESPN+): Jason Baker (play-by-play) and Austin Davis (analyst)
- Box score, Recap

Game information

First quarter

- (10:12) TXST – Tyler Robles 29-yard field goal (Drive: 12 plays, 69 yards, 4:48; Texas State 3–0)
- (2:16) TXST – Brad Jackson 3-yard run, Tyler Robles kick (Drive: 12 plays, 86 yards, 4:34; Texas State 10–0)

Second quarter

- (10:41) TXST – Tyler Robles 50-yard field goal (Drive: 12 plays, 55 yards, 4:29; Texas State 13–0)
- (6:03) TXST – Chris Dawn Jr. 82-yard pass from Brad Jackson, Tyler Robles kick (Drive: 3 plays, 86 yards, 1:20; Texas State 20–0)
- (1:06) TXST – Brad Jackson 4-yard run, Tyler Robles kick (Drive: 6 plays, 86 yards, 3:25; Texas State 27–0)

Third quarter

- (2:58) USM – Elijah Metcalf 4-yard pass from Landry Lyddy, Creighton Wilbanks kick (Drive: 11 plays, 51 yards, 4:11; Texas State 27–7)

Fourth quarter

- (12:32) TXST – Lincoln Pare 1-yard run, Tyler Robles kick (Drive: 12 plays, 75 yards, 5:26; Texas State 34–7)
- (7:45) TXST – Christopher Jones 100-yard interception, Tyler Robles kick (Texas State 41–7)
- (1:39) USM – Jeffery Pittman 2-yard run, Creighton Wilbanks kick (Drive: 10 plays, 75 yards, 2:50; Texas State 41–14)

Statistics	TXST	USM
First downs	25	20
Plays–yards	68–449	74–391
Rushes–yards	51–257	30–124
Passing yards	192	267
Passing: Comp–Att–Int	14–17–0	29–44–2
Turnovers	0	3
Time of possession	32:04	27:56

Team	Category	Player	Statistics
Texas State	Passing	Brad Jackson	14/17, 192 yards, TD
Texas State	Rushing	Lincoln Pare	21 carries, 118 yards, TD
Texas State	Receiving	Chris Dawn Jr.	5 receptions, 117 yards, TD
Southern Miss	Passing	Landry Lyddy	29/44, 267 yards, TD, 2 INT
Southern Miss	Rushing	Jeffery Pittman	11 carries, 54 yards, TD
Southern Miss	Receiving	Elijah Metcalf	10 receptions, 116 yards, TD

=== Louisiana–Monroe ===
Louisiana–Monroe Warhawks (3–7) at Texas State Bobcats (4–6) – Game summary

Quarter	1	2	3	4	Total
Warhawks	0	0	7	7	14
Bobcats	0	3	14	14	31

at UFCU Stadium, San Marcos, Texas

- Date: November 22
- Game time: 4:00 p.m. CDT
- Game weather: Sunny
- Game attendance: 17,078
- Referee: Steven Robinson
- TV announcers (ESPN+): Brant Freeman (play-by-play) and Keith Moreland (analyst)
- Box score, Recap

Game information

First quarter

- No scoring plays.

Second quarter

- (12:08) TXST – Tyler Robles 30-yard field goal (Drive: 14 plays, 71 yards, 4:55; Texas State 3–0)

Third quarter

- (11:10) TXST – Brad Jackson 19-yard run, Tyler Robles kick (Drive: 5 plays, 34 yards, 1:48; Texas State 10–0)
- (7:15) ULM – Zach Palmer-Smith 14-yard run, Jacob Chambliss kick (Drive: 10 plays, 75 yards, 3:55; Texas State 10–7)
- (3:12) TXST – Lincoln Pare 6-yard pass from Brad Jackson, Tyler Robles kick (Drive: 11 plays, 72 yards, 4:03; Texas State 17–7)

Fourth quarter

- (11:30) TXST – Beau Sparks 16-yard pass from Brad Jackson, Tyler Robles kick (Drive: 9 plays, 95 yards, 3:53; Texas State 24–7)
- (7:37) ULM – Aidan Armenta 12-yard run, Jacob Chambliss kick (Drive: 10 plays, 75 yards, 3:55; Texas State 24–14)
- (1:44) TXST – Brad Jackson 7-yard run, Tyler Robles kick (Drive: 11 plays, 72 yards, 5:53; Texas State 31–14)

Statistics	ULM	TXST
First downs	19	26
Plays–yards	61–300	75–422
Rushes–yards	35–134	43–221
Passing yards	166	201
Passing: Comp–Att–Int	19–26–0	25–32–1
Turnovers	0	1
Time of possession	27:53	32:07

Team	Category	Player	Statistics
Louisiana–Monroe	Passing	Aidan Armenta	19/26, 166 yards
Louisiana–Monroe	Rushing	Zach Palmer-Smith	15 carries, 80 yards, TD
Louisiana–Monroe	Receiving	JP Coulter	3 receptions, 56 yards
Texas State	Passing	Brad Jackson	25/32, 201 yards, 2 TD, INT
Texas State	Rushing	Brad Jackson	15 carries, 88 yards, 2 TD
Texas State	Receiving	Beau Sparks	10 receptions, 68 yards, TD

=== South Alabama ===
South Alabama Jaguars (4–7) at Texas State Bobcats (5–6) – Game summary

Quarter	1	2	3	4	Total
Jaguars	7	0	0	19	26
Bobcats	10	11	14	14	49

at UFCU Stadium, San Marcos, Texas

- Date: November 29
- Game time: 2:00 p.m.
- Game weather: Sunny • Temperature: 76 °F (24 °C)
- Game attendance: 16,169
- Referee: Trennis Livingston
- TV announcers (ESPN+): Brant Freeman (play-by-play) and Keith Moreland (analyst)
- Box score, Recap

Game information

First quarter

- (10:23) TXST – Tyler Robles 36-yard field goal (Drive: 12 plays, 67 yards, 4:29; Texas State 3–0)
- (4:40) TXST – Brad Jackson 19-yard run, Tyler Robles kick (Drive: 3 plays, 69 yards, 1:08; Texas State 10–0)
- (1:38) USA – Kentrel Bullock 1-yard run, Davis Little kick (Drive: 8 plays, 75 yards, 3:02; Texas State 10–7)

Second quarter

- (11:08) TXST – Tyler Robles 31-yard field goal (Drive: 14 plays, 73 yards, 5:25; Texas State 13–7)
- (1:08) TXST – Lincoln Pare 32-yard pass from Brad Jackson, Titus Lyons pass (Drive: 2 plays, 60 yards, 0:18; Texas State 21–7)

Third quarter

- (8:03) TXST – Brad Jackson 8-yard run, Tyler Robles kick (Drive: 11 plays, 69 yards, 4:29; Texas State 28–7)
- (4:48) TXST – Beau Sparks 50-yard pass from Brad Jackson, Tyler Robles kick (Drive: 1 play, 50 yards, 0:09; Texas State 35–7)

Fourth quarter

- (12:46) TXST – Brad Jackson 6-yard run, Tyler Robles kick (Drive: 13 plays, 70 yards, 6:13; Texas State 42–7)
- (6:20) USA – Keenan Phillips 1-yard run, Davis Little kick (Drive: 14 plays, 75 yards, 6:26; Texas State 42–14)
- (6:06) TXST – Jaylen Jenkins 100-yard kickoff return, Tyler Robles kick (Texas State 49–14)
- (4:07) USA – Trae'von Dunbar 34-yard run (Drive: 5 plays, 57 yards, 1:53; Texas State 49–20)
- (3:55) USA – Jeremy Scott 35-yard pass from Jared Hollins (Drive: 1 play, 35 yards, 0:07; Texas State 49–26)

Statistics	USA	TXST
First downs	22	26
Plays–yards	70–362	69–544
Rushes–yards	38–205	43–263
Passing yards	157	281
Passing: Comp–Att–Int	20–32–1	20–26–0
Turnovers	1	2
Time of possession	29:11	30:49

Team	Category	Player	Statistics
South Alabama	Passing	Bishop Davenport	13/21, 96 yards, INT
South Alabama	Rushing	Kentrel Bullock	15 carries, 84 yards, TD
South Alabama	Receiving	Devin Voisin	7 receptions, 52 yards
Texas State	Passing	Brad Jackson	20/26, 281 yards, 2 TD
Texas State	Rushing	Brad Jackson	13 carries, 113 yards, 3 TD
Texas State	Receiving	Chris Dawn Jr.	8 receptions, 154 yards

=== vs. Rice (Armed Forces Bowl) ===
2026 Lockheed Martin Armed Forces Bowl
Rice Owls (5–7) vs. Texas State Bobcats (6–6) – Game summary

Quarter	1	2	3	4	Total
Owls	0	7	0	3	10
Bobcats	0	10	17	14	41

at Amon G. Carter Stadium, Fort Worth, Texas

- Date: January 2, 2026
- Game time: 12:00 p.m. CST
- Game weather: Sunny, 66 °F (19 °C)
- Game attendance: 28,243
- Referee: Matt Packowski (MAC)
- TV announcers (ESPN): Lowell Galindo (play-by-play), Aaron Murray (analyst) and Lauren Sisler (sideline)
- Box score, Recap

Game information
First quarter
- No scoring plays

Second quarter

- TXST – Brad Jackson 6-yard run (Tyler Robles kick), 10:31. Bobcats 7–0. Drive: 8 plays, 38 yards, 3:46.
- TXST – Tyler Robles 30-yard field goal, 6:17. Bobcats 10–0. Drive: 9 plays, 78 yards, 2:40.
- RICE – Aaron Turner 2-yard pass from Patrick Crayton Jr. (Enock Gota kick), 0:09. Bobcats 10–7. Drive: 6 plays, 68 yards, 1:08.

Third quarter

- TXST – Beau Sparks 69-yard pass from Brad Jackson (Tyler Robles kick), 14:07. Bobcats 17–7. Drive: 3 plays, 81 yards, 0:48.
- TXST – Chris Dawn Jr. 12-yard pass from Brad Jackson (Tyler Robles kick), 8:36. Bobcats 24–7. Drive: 2 plays, 11 yards, 0:11.
- TXST – Tyler Robles 29-yard field goal, 6:53. Bobcats 27–7. Drive: 4 plays, 7 yards, 1:35.

Fourth quarter

- TXST – Lincoln Pare 63-yard run (Tyler Robles kick), 14:41. Bobcats 34–7. Drive: 1 play, 63 yards, 0:12.
- TXST – Chris Dawn Jr. 14-yard pass from Brad Jackson (Tyler Robles kick), 9:10. Bobcats 41–7. Drive: 7 plays, 90 yards, 3:09.
- RICE – Enock Gota 28-yard field goal, 5:32. Bobcats 41–10. Drive: 9 plays, 60 yards, 3:38.

Statistics	RICE	TXST
First downs	12	24
Plays–yards	65–195	67–436
Rushes–yards	44–102	41–241
Passing yards	94	195
Passing: Comp–Att–Int	13–21–1	18–26–0
Turnovers	3	1
Time of possession	30:32	29:28

Team	Category	Player	Statistics
Rice	Passing	Patrick Crayton Jr.	4/9, 70 yards, TD, INT
Rice	Rushing	Quinton Jackson	16 carries, 78 yards
Rice	Receiving	Payton Matthews	1 reception, 54 yards
Texas State	Passing	Brad Jackson	17/24, 173 yards, 3 TD
Texas State	Rushing	Lincoln Pare	11 carries, 106 yards, TD
Texas State	Receiving	Beau Sparks	4 receptions, 87 yards, TD
