= 2025 Georgia State Panthers football team =

American college football season

2025 Georgia State Panthers football
- Conference: Sun Belt Conference
- East Division
- Record: 1–11 (0–8 Sun Belt)
- Head coach: Dell McGee (2nd season)
- Offensive coordinator: Hue Jackson (1st season)
- Offensive scheme: Pro-style
- Defensive coordinator: Travis Pearson (1st season)
- Base defense: 4–2–5
- Home stadium: Center Parc Stadium

2025 Sun Belt Conference football standings
	Conf.			Overall
Team	W		L	W		L
East Division
No. 19 James Madison xy$^	8	–	0	12	–	2
Old Dominion	6	–	2	10	–	3
Coastal Carolina	5	–	3	6	–	7
Georgia Southern	4	–	4	7	–	6
Marshall	3	–	5	5	–	7
Appalachian State	2	–	6	5	–	8
Georgia State	0	–	8	1	–	11
West Division
Troy xy	6	–	2	8	–	6
Southern Miss	5	–	3	7	–	6
Louisiana	5	–	3	6	–	7
Arkansas State	5	–	3	7	–	6
Texas State	3	–	5	7	–	6
South Alabama	3	–	5	4	–	8
Louisiana–Monroe	1	–	7	3	–	9
Championship: James Madison 31, Troy 14
^ – College Football Playoff participant; $ – Conference champion; x – Division champion/co-champions; y – Championship game participant; Rankings from AP Poll

The 2025 Georgia State Panthers football team represented Georgia State University in the Sun Belt Conference's East Division during the 2025 NCAA Division I FBS football season. The Panthers were led by Dell McGee in his second year as the head coach. The Panthers played their home games at Center Parc Stadium, located in Atlanta, Georgia.

== Preseason ==
=== Media poll ===
In the Sun Belt preseason coaches' poll, the Panthers were picked to finish last place in the East division.

Wide receiver Ted Hurst was named to the preseason All-Sun Belt first team offense. Defensive lineman Henry Bryant was named to the second team defense.

== Schedule ==
Date	Time	Opponent	Site	TV	Result	Attendance
August 30	7:45 p.m.	at No. 21 Ole Miss*	Vaught–Hemingway Stadium; Oxford, MS	SECN	L 7–63	66,378
September 6	7:00 p.m.	Memphis*	Center Parc Stadium; Atlanta, GA	ESPN+	L 16–38	13,625
September 13	7:00 p.m.	Murray State*	Center Parc Stadium; Atlanta, GA	ESPN+	W 37–21	13,988
September 20	7:30 p.m.	at No. 20 Vanderbilt*	FirstBank Stadium; Nashville, TN	ESPNU	L 21–70	35,000
October 4	3:30 p.m.	James Madison	Center Parc Stadium; Atlanta, GA	ESPN+	L 7–14	19,256
October 11	3:30 p.m.	Appalachian State^{†}	Center Parc Stadium; Atlanta, GA	ESPN+	L 20–41	19,587
October 18	7:00 p.m.	at Georgia Southern	Paulson Stadium; Statesboro, GA (rivalry)	ESPN+	L 24–41	25,428
October 23	7:30 p.m.	South Alabama	Center Parc Stadium; Atlanta, GA	ESPN2	L 31–38	13,673
November 8	4:00 p.m.	at Coastal Carolina	Brooks Stadium; Conway, SC	ESPN+	L 27–40	18,878
November 15	2:00 p.m.	Marshall	Center Parc Stadium; Atlanta, GA	ESPN+	L 18–30	12,871
November 22	4:00 p.m.	at Troy	Veterans Memorial Stadium; Troy, AL	ESPN+	L 19–31	20,243
November 29	2:00 p.m.	at Old Dominion	S.B. Ballard Stadium; Norfolk, VA (Oyster Bowl)	ESPN+	L 10–27	17,126
*Non-conference game; ^{†}Homecoming; Rankings from AP Poll and CFP Rankings released prior to game; All times are in Eastern time

== Game summaries ==
=== at No. 21 Ole Miss ===
Georgia State Panthers (0–0) at No. 21 Ole Miss Rebels (0–0) – Game summary

Quarter	1	2	3	4	Total
Panthers	0	7	0	0	7
No. 21 Rebels	7	18	17	21	63

at Vaught–Hemingway Stadium • Oxford, Mississippi

- Date: August 30, 2025
- Game time: 6:45 p.m.
- Game weather: Sunny • Temperature: 84 °F (29 °C) • Wind: NE 2 mph
- Game attendance: 66,378
- Referee: Ken Williamson
- TV announcers (SECN): Tom Hart (play-by-play), Jordan Rodgers (analyst), and Cole Cubelic (sideline)

Game information

First quarter

- MISS – Dae'Quan Wright 38-yard pass from Austin Simmons (Lucas Carneiro kick), 10:32. Rebels 7–0. Drive: 3 plays, 65 yards, 0:48.

Second quarter

- MISS – Lucas Carneiro 42-yard field goal, 11:28. Rebels 10–0. Drive: 8 plays, 60 yards, 2:36.
- MISS – Kewan Lacy 1-yard run (Lucas Carneiro kick), 7:31. Rebels 17–0. Drive: 9 plays, 56 yards, 2:53.
- GAST – Javon Robinson 43-yard pass from Christian Veilleux (Liam Rickman kick), 5:19. Rebels 17–7. Drive: 4 plays, 75 yards, 2:12.
- MISS – Kewan Lacy 2-yard run (Trinidad Chambliss run), 0:21. Rebels 25–7. Drive: 16 plays, 75 yards, 4:58.

Third quarter

- MISS – Kewan Lacy 42-yard run (Lucas Carneiro kick), 13:04. Rebels 32–7. Drive: 6 plays, 75 yards, 1:56.
- MISS – Caleb Odom 9-yard pass from Austin Simmons (Lucas Carneiro kick), 10:32. Rebels 39–7. Drive: 3 plays, 20 yards, 1:16.
- MISS – Lucas Carneiro 33-yard field goal, 0:20. Rebels 42–7. Drive: 10 plays, 37 yards, 3:53.

Fourth quarter

- MISS – Harrison Wallace III 26-yard pass from Austin Simmons (Mike Baker kick), 13:31. Rebels 49–7. Drive: 2 plays, 61 yards, 0:32.
- MISS – Izaiah Hartrup 13-yard pass from Trinidad Chambliss (Mike Baker kick), 6:38. Rebels 56–7. Drive: 6 plays, 62 yards, 2:36.
- MISS – Logan Diggs 5-yard run (Mike Baker kick), 0:33. Rebels 63–7. Drive: 6 plays, 82 yards, 2:27.

Statistics	GAST	MISS
First downs	10	33
Plays–yards	60–260	68–695
Rushes–yards	35–191	44–295
Passing yards	69	400
Passing: comp–att–int	12–25–1	24–37–2
Turnovers	1	2
Time of possession	31:24	28:36

Team	Category	Player	Statistics
Georgia State	Passing	Christian Veilleux	4/11, 52 yards, TD, INT
Georgia State	Rushing	Rashad Amos	9 carries, 69 yards
Georgia State	Receiving	Javon Robinson	3 receptions, 52 yards, TD
Ole Miss	Passing	Austin Simmons	20/31, 341 yards, 3 TD, 2 INT
Ole Miss	Rushing	Kewan Lacy	16 carries, 108 yards, 3 TD
Ole Miss	Receiving	Harrison Wallace III	5 receptions, 130 yards, TD

=== Memphis ===
Memphis Tigers (1–0) at Georgia State Panthers (0–1) – Game summary

Quarter	1	2	3	4	Total
Tigers	7	10	14	7	38
Panthers	9	7	0	0	16

at Center Parc Stadium • Atlanta, Georgia

- Date: September 6
- Game time: 6:00 p.m. CDT
- Game weather: Cloudy • Temperature: 75 °F (24 °C) • Wind: SE at 6 miles per hour (9.7 km/h)
- Game attendance: 13,625
- Referee: Edwin Lee
- TV announcers (ESPN+): Matt Stewart (play-by-play) and Sam Crenshaw (analyst)

Game information

First quarter

- (9:07) MEM – Sutton Smith 16-yard run, Gianni Spetic kick (Drive: 2 plays, 66 yards, 0:35; Memphis 7–0)
- (3:22) GAST – Team safety (Memphis 7–2)
- (0:17) GAST – Cameran Brown 22-yard run, Liam Rickman kick (Drive: 7 plays, 63 yards, 3:01; Georgia State 9–7)

Second quarter

- (5:34) MEM – Makari Bodiford 7-yard run, Gianni Spetic kick (Drive: 10 plays, 75 yards, 5:45; Memphis 14–9)
- (2:40) GAST – Javon Robinson 44-yard pass from Cameran Brown, Braeden McAlister kick (Drive: 8 plays, 75 yards, 2:54; Georgia State 16–14)
- (0:00) MEM – Gianni Spetic 55-yard field goal (Drive: 4 plays, 18 yards, 0:20; Memphis 17–16)

Third quarter

- (10:08) MEM – Brendon Lewis 5-yard run, Gianni Spetic kick (Drive: 10 plays, 75 yards, 4:52; Memphis 24–16)
- (0:15) MEM – Makari Bodiford 1-yard run, Gianni Spetic kick (Drive: 10 plays, 51 yards, 5:58; Memphis 31–16)

Fourth quarter

- (0:11) MEM – DeMarco Ward 31-yard interception return, Gianni Spetic kick (Memphis 38–16)

Statistics	MEM	GAST
First downs	21	19
Plays–yards	60–401	68–389
Rushes–yards	40–205	27–49
Passing yards	196	340
Passing: comp–att–int	16–20–0	29–41–1
Turnovers	0	1
Time of possession	29:53	30:07

Team	Category	Player	Statistics
Memphis	Passing	Brendon Lewis	16/20, 196 yards
Memphis	Rushing	Sutton Smith	14 carries, 74 yards, TD
Memphis	Receiving	Jamari Hawkins	3 receptions, 79 yards
Georgia State	Passing	T. J. Finley	21/29, 201 yards, INT
Georgia State	Rushing	Cameran Brown	3 carries, 25 yards, TD
Georgia State	Receiving	Ted Hurst	7 receptions, 97 yards

=== Murray State (FCS) ===
Murray State Racers (FCS) (0–2) at Georgia State Panthers (0–2) – Game summary

Quarter	1	2	3	4	Total
Racers (FCS)	0	7	0	14	21
Panthers	14	9	7	7	37

at Center Parc Stadium • Atlanta, GA

- Date: September 13, 2025
- Game time: 7:00 PM EDT
- Game weather: Sunny
- Game attendance: 13,988
- Referee: Jeremy Parker
- TV announcers (ESPN+): Matt Stewart (play-by-play) and Sam Crenshaw (analyst)

Game information

First quarter

- (7:26) GAST – Ted Hurst 1-yard pass from TJ Finley, Braeden McAlister kick (Drive: 6 plays, 65 yards, 2:44; Georgia State 7–0)
- (2:47) GAST – Leo Blackburn 5-yard pass from Cameran Brown, Braeden McAlister kick (Drive: 9 plays, 58 yards, 3:44; Georgia State 14–0)

Second quarter

- (13:51) MUR – Jawaun Northington 5-yard run, Jack Tannehill kick (Drive: 10 plays, 75 yards, 3:56; Georgia State 14–7)
- (3:50) GAST – Team Safety (Drive: 3 plays, -6 yards, 1:23; Georgia State 16–7)
- (0:48) GAST – Rashad Amos 1-yard run, Braeden McAlister kick (Drive: 2 plays, 4 yards, 0:47; Georgia State 23–7)

Third quarter

- (3:04) GAST – Ted Hurst 16-yard pass from Cameran Brown, Braeden McAlister kick (Drive: 10 plays, 76 yards, 4:54; Georgia State 30–7)

Fourth quarter

- (12:50) MUR – Lucas Desjardins 4-yard pass from Jim Ogle, two-point pass conversion attempt failed (Drive: 11 plays, 75 yards, 5:14; Georgia State 30–13)
- (7:07) GAST – Camden Overton-Howard 3-yard pass from Cameran Brown, Braeden McAlister kick (Drive: 10 plays, 70 yards, 5:38; Georgia State 37–13)
- (1:55) MUR – Baxter Wright 3-yard run, Baxter Wright two-point conversion pass to Tyrell Campbell (Drive: 11 plays, 75 yards, 5:12; Georgia State 37–21)

Statistics	MUR	GAST
First downs	22	18
Plays–yards	72–282	62–454
Rushes–yards	42–123	32–166
Passing yards	159	288
Passing: Comp–Att–Int	19–30–0	21–30–2
Turnovers	1	3
Time of possession	29:05	30:55

Team	Category	Player	Statistics
Murray State	Passing	Jim Ogle	17/28, 138 yards, TD
Murray State	Rushing	Jawaun Northington	14 carries, 64 yards, TD
Murray State	Receiving	Lucas Desjardins	7 receptions, 75 yards, TD
Georgia State	Passing	TJ Finley	11/18, 150 yards, TD, 2 INT
Georgia State	Rushing	Branson Robinson	8 carries, 65 yards
Georgia State	Receiving	Ted Hurst	10 receptions, 172 yards, 2 TD

=== at No. 20 Vanderbilt ===
Georgia State Panthers (1–2) at No. 20 Vanderbilt Commodores (3–0) – Game summary

Quarter	1	2	3	4	Total
Panthers	3	6	6	6	21
No. 20 Commodores	21	21	14	14	70

at FirstBank Stadium • Nashville, Tennessee

- Date: September 20
- Game time: 6:30 p.m. CDT
- Game weather: Partly cloudy, 86°F
- Game attendance: 35,000
- Referee: James Carter
- TV announcers (ESPNU): Jay Alter (play-by-play) and Rocky Boiman (analyst)

Game information

First quarter

- (10:24) GAST – Braeden McAlister 52-yard field goal (Drive: 8 plays, 41 yards, 4:36; Georgia State 3–0)
- (5:52) VAN – Sedrick Alexander 3-yard run, Brock Taylor kick (Drive: 8 plays, 75 yards, 4:32; Vanderbilt 7–3)
- (3:08) VAN – Diego Pavia 16-yard run, Brock Taylor kick (Drive: 4 plays, 71 yards, 1:31; Vanderbilt 14–3)
- (1:33) VAN – Junior Sherrill 8-yard run, Brock Taylor kick (Drive: 3 plays, 35 yards, 1:23; Vanderbilt 21–3)

Second quarter

- (10:21) GAST – Jordon Simmons 4-yard pass from Cameran Brown, Braeden McAlister kick blocked (Drive: 13 plays, 75 yards, 6:12; Vanderbilt 21–9)
- (4:15) VAN – AJ Newberry 2-yard run, Brock Taylor kick (Drive: 10 plays, 52 yards, 5:56; Vanderbilt 28–9)
- (1:41) VAN – AJ Newberry 8-yard run, Brock Taylor kick (Drive: 6 plays, 69 yards, 1:16; Vanderbilt 35–9)
- (0:24) VAN – Sedrick Alexander 10-yard pass from Diego Pavia, Brock Taylor kick (Drive: 7 plays, 83 yards, 0:53; Vanderbilt 42–9)

Third quarter

- (10:11) GAST – Leo Blackburn 3-yard pass from TJ Finley, two-point conversion run attempt failed (Drive: 5 plays, 34 yards, 3:16; Vanderbilt 42–15)
- (9:23) VAN – Makhilyn Young 60-yard run, Brock Taylor kick (Drive: 2 plays, 64 yards, 0:47; Vanderbilt 49–15)
- (8:38) VAN – Jamison Curtis 4-yard blocked punt return, Brock Taylor kick (Drive: 3 plays, -4 yards, 0:45; Vanderbilt 56–15)

Fourth quarter

- VAN – Blaze Berlowitz 7-yard run (Brock Taylor kick), 11:02. Commodores 63–15. Drive: 6 plays, 70 yards, 3:07.
- (11:02) VAN – Drew Dickey 9-yard run, Mason Rohmiller kick (Drive: 5 plays, 41 yards, 2:16; Vanderbilt 70–15)
- (2:26) GAST – DJ Riles 32-yard from TJ Finley, two-point pass conversion attempt failed (Drive: 11 plays, 75 yards, 4:57; Vanderbilt 70–21)

Statistics	GAST	VAN
First downs	18	30
Plays–yards	68–290	61–635
Rushes–yards	20–32	37–286
Passing yards	258	349
Passing: comp–att–int	31-48-0	23-24-0
Turnovers	1	0
Time of possession	30:11	29:49

Team	Category	Player	Statistics
Georgia State	Passing	TJ Finley	22-35, 176 yards, 2 TD
Georgia State	Rushing	Rashad Amos	5 carries, 25 yards
Georgia State	Receiving	Ted Hurst	7 receptions, 71 yards
Vanderbilt	Passing	Diego Pavia	18-24, 245 yards, TD
Vanderbilt	Rushing	Diego Pavia	9 carries, 86 yards, TD
Vanderbilt	Receiving	Eli Stowers	5 receptions, 73 yards

=== James Madison ===
James Madison Dukes (3–1) at Georgia State Panthers (1–3) – Game summary

Quarter	1	2	3	4	Total
Dukes	0	0	7	7	14
Panthers	7	0	0	0	7

at Center Parc Stadium • Atlanta, GA

- Date: October 4, 2025
- Game time: 3:30 p.m. EDT
- Game weather: Sunny • Temperature: 75 °F (24 °C)
- Game attendance: 19,256
- Referee: Tim Barker
- TV announcers (ESPN+): Matt Stewart (play-by-play) and Sam Crenshaw (analyst)

Game information

First quarter

- (4:03) GAST – Camden Overton-Howard 19-yard pass from TJ Finley, Braeden McAlister kick (Drive: 6 plays, 71 yards, 3:24; Georgia State 7–0)

Second quarter

- No scoring plays.

Third quarter

- (6:50) JMU – Alonza Barnett III 1-yard run, Morgan Suarez kick (Drive: 8 plays, 85 yards, 3:27; Tied 7–7)

Fourth quarter

- (9:50) JMU – Wayne Knight 9-yard run, Morgan Suarez kick (Drive: 4 plays, 28 yards, 1:43; James Madison 14–7)

Statistics	JMU	GAST
First downs	19	14
Plays–yards	65–285	54–249
Rushes–yards	43–211	22–37
Passing yards	74	212
Passing: Comp–Att–Int	11–22–0	22–32–0
Turnovers	0	0
Time of possession	31:53	28:07

Team	Category	Player	Statistics
James Madison	Passing	Alonza Barnett III	11/22, 74 yards
James Madison	Rushing	Jordan Fuller	18 carries, 94 yards
James Madison	Receiving	Landon Ellis	3 receptions, 28 yards
Georgia State	Passing	TJ Finley	19/28, 198 yards, TD
Georgia State	Rushing	Rashad Amos	11 carries, 30 yards
Georgia State	Receiving	Camden Overton-Howard	7 receptions, 65 yards, TD

=== Appalachian State ===
Appalachian State Mountaineers (3–2) at Georgia State Panthers (1–4) – Game summary

Quarter	1	2	3	4	Total
Mountaineers	7	10	21	3	41
Panthers	0	0	14	6	20

at Center Parc Stadium • Atlanta, GA

- Date: October 11, 2025
- Game time: 3:30 p.m. EDT
- Game attendance: 19,587
- Referee: Jeremy Parker
- TV announcers (ESPN+): Matt Stewart (play-by-play) and Sam Crenshaw (analyst)

Game information

First quarter

- (1:04) APP – Devon Dozier 12-yard pass from JJ Kohl, Dominic De Freitas kick (Drive: 13 plays, 98 yards, 5:37; Appalachian State 7–0)

Second quarter

- (2:37) APP – Jaden Barnes 11-yard pass from JJ Kohl, Dominic De Freitas kick (Drive: 10 plays, 83 yards, 4:03; Appalachian State 14–0)
- (0:00) APP – Dominic De Freitas 32-yard field goal (Drive: 8 plays, 66 yards, 1:18; Appalachian State 17–0)

Third quarter

- (12:10) APP – Jaquari Lewis 14-yard run, Dominic De Freitas kick (Drive: 3 plays, 37 yards, 1:13; Appalachian State 24–0)
- (8:10) APP – Dalton Stroman 6-yard pass from JJ Kohl, Dominic De Freitas kick (Drive: 6 plays, 59 yards, 2:41; Appalachian State 31–0)
- (4:40) GAST – Cameran Brown 8-yard run, two-point pass conversion attempt failed (Drive: 12 plays, 75 yards, 3:30; Appalachian State 31–6)
- (3:40) APP – Izayah Cummings 3-yard pass from JJ Kohl, Dominic De Freitas kick (Drive: 3 plays, 49 yards, 0:58; Appalachian State 38–6)
- (0:50) GAST – Grant Hollier 15-yard pass from Cameran Brown, Cameran Brown pass to Ted Hurst for two-point conversion (Drive: 10 plays, 75 yards, 2:50; Appalachian State 38–14)

Fourth quarter

- (10:00) APP – Dominic De Freitas 46-yard field goal (Drive: 4 plays, 4 yards, 0:47; Appalachian State 41–14)
- (6:25) GAST – Javon Robinson 22-yard pass from Cameran Brown, two-point pass conversion attempt failed (Drive: 8 plays, 75 yards, 3:35; Appalachian State 41–20)

Statistics	APP	GAST
First downs	23	24
Plays–yards	74–435	84–381
Rushes–yards	36–124	23–78
Passing yards	311	303
Passing: Comp–Att–Int	23–38–0	32–61–1
Turnovers	0	1
Time of possession	31:47	28:13

Team	Category	Player	Statistics
Appalachian State	Passing	JJ Kohl	21/32, 309 yards, 4 TD
Appalachian State	Rushing	Jaquari Lewis	14 carries, 57 yards, TD
Appalachian State	Receiving	Izayah Cummings	6 receptions, 94 yards, TD
Georgia State	Passing	Cameran Brown	19/35, 212 yards, 2 TD
Georgia State	Rushing	Cameran Brown	7 carries, 30 yards, TD
Georgia State	Receiving	Ted Hurst	9 receptions, 105 yards

=== at Georgia Southern (Modern Day Hate) ===
Georgia State Panthers (1–5) at Georgia Southern Eagles (2–4) – Game summary

Quarter	1	2	3	4	Total
Panthers	7	10	7	0	24
Eagles	3	10	7	21	41

at Paulson Stadium • Statesboro, GA

- Date: October 18, 2025
- Game time: 7:00 p.m. EDT
- Game weather: Sunny • Temperature: 71 °F (22 °C)
- Game attendance: 25,428
- Referee: Trennis Livingston
- TV announcers (ESPN+): Danny Waugh (play-by-play), Jayson Foster (analyst) and Whitney Haworth (sideline)

Game information

First quarter

- (12:19) GASO – Tripp Bryant 38-yard field goal (Drive: 10 plays, 47 yards, 2:36; Georgia Southern 3–0)
- (4:52) GAST – Cameran Brown 15-yard run, Liam Rickman kick (Drive: 13 plays, 88 yards, 7:21; Georgia State 7–3)

Second quarter

- (13:37) GASO – Camden Brown 20-yard pass from JC French IV, Tripp Bryant kick (Drive: 14 plays, 70 yards, 6:15; Georgia Southern 10–7)
- (7:55) GAST – Liam Rickman 31-yard field goal (Drive: 12 plays, 62 yards, 5:42; Tied 10–10)
- (0:46) GAST – Ted Hurst 5-yard pass from Cameran Brown, Liam Rickman kick (Drive: 10 plays, 90 yards, 3:28; Georgia State 17–10)
- (0:00) GASO – Tripp Bryant 46-yard field goal (Drive: 7 plays, 47 yards, 0:46; Georgia State 17–13)

Third quarter

- (8:08) GASO – JC French IV 4-yard run, Tripp Bryant kick (Drive: 7 plays, 43 yards, 3:01; Georgia Southern 20–17)
- (3:02) GAST – Rashad Amos 3-yard run, Liam Rickman kick (Drive: 10 plays, 83 yards, 5:01; Georgia State 24–20)

Fourth quarter

- (14:58) GASO – Weston Bryant 1-yard run, Tripp Bryant kick (Drive: 8 plays, 75 yards, 3:04; Georgia Southern 27–24)
- (9:50) GASO – Camden Brown 16-yard pass from JC French IV, Tripp Bryant kick (Drive: 7 plays, 66 yards, 3:29; Georgia Southern 34–24)
- (4:33) GASO – Dalen Cobb 5-yard pass from JC French IV, Tripp Bryant kick (Drive: 8 plays, 49 yards, 3:53; Georgia Southern 41–24)

Statistics	GAST	GASO
First downs	27	25
Plays–yards	72–444	69–420
Rushes–yards	34–164	42–208
Passing yards	280	212
Passing: Comp–Att–Int	29–38–0	18–27–0
Turnovers	1	0
Time of possession	32:20	27:40

Team	Category	Player	Statistics
Georgia State	Passing	Cameran Brown	29/38, 280 yards, TD
Georgia State	Rushing	Cameran Brown	15 carries, 120 yards, TD
Georgia State	Receiving	Javon Robinson	7 receptions, 71 yards
Georgia Southern	Passing	JC French IV	17/25, 210 yards, 3 TD
Georgia Southern	Rushing	JC French IV	12 carries, 85 yards, TD
Georgia Southern	Receiving	OJ Arnold	4 receptions, 85 yards

=== South Alabama ===
South Alabama Jaguars (1–6) at Georgia State Panthers (1–6) – Game summary

Quarter	1	2	3	4	Total
Jaguars	21	7	0	10	38
Panthers	14	0	3	14	31

at Center Parc Stadium • Atlanta, GA

- Date: October 23, 2025
- Game time: 7:30 PM EDT
- Game weather: Sunny
- Game attendance: 13,673
- Referee: Scott Broadway
- TV announcers (ESPN2): Matt Barrie (play-by-play), Tom Luginbill (analyst) and Harry Lyles Jr. (sideline)

Game information

First quarter

- (8:40) USA – Brendan Jenkins 18-yard pass from Bishop Davenport, Hamilton DiBoyan kick (Drive: 10 plays, 53 yards, 4:57; South Alabama 7–0)
- (7:15) GAST – Ted Hurst 70-yard pass from Cameran Brown, Liam Rickman kick (Drive: 3 plays, 74 yards, 1:20; Tied 7–7)
- (6:12) USA – Jeremy Scott 74-yard pass from Bishop Davenport, Hamilton DiBoyan kick (Drive: 3 plays, 75 yards, 1:03; South Alabama 14–7)
- (3:55) GAST – Dennis Murray Jr. 52-yard pass from Cameran Brown, Liam Rickman kick (Drive: 6 plays, 75 yards, 2:17; Tied 14–14)
- (2:12) USA – Kentrel Bullock 6-yard run, Hamilton DiBoyan kick (Drive: 4 plays, 75 yards, 1:43; South Alabama 21–14)

Second quarter

- (7:55) USA – Bishop Davenport 3-yard run, Hamilton DiBoyan kick (Drive: 14 plays, 82 yards, 6:46; South Alabama 28–14)

Third quarter

- (8:04) GAST – Liam Rickman 25-yard field goal (Drive: 15 plays, 69 yards, 5:59; South Alabama 28–17)

Fourth quarter

- (14:56) GAST – Ted Hurst 5-yard pass from Cameran Brown (Drive: 13 plays, 62 yards, 6:24; South Alabama 28–23)
- (9:38) GAST – Grant Hollier 11-yard pass from Cameran Brown, Dennis Murray Jr. pass (Drive: 9 plays, 65 yards, 3:49; Georgia State 31–28)
- (5:39) USA – Davis Little 23-yard field goal (Drive: 9 plays, 70 yards, 3:59; Tied 31–31)
- (1:49) USA – Kentrel Bullock 4-yard run, Davis Little kick (Drive: 6 plays, 47 yards, 2:22; South Alabama 38–31)

Statistics	USA	GAST
First downs	20	23
Plays–yards	69–468	70–440
Rushes–yards	47–188	37–199
Passing yards	280	241
Passing: Comp–Att–Int	16–22–0	19–33–1
Turnovers	0	2
Time of possession	30:03	29:57

Team	Category	Player	Statistics
South Alabama	Passing	Bishop Davenport	16/22, 280 yards, 2 TD
South Alabama	Rushing	Kentrel Bullock	20 carries, 113 yards, 2 TD
South Alabama	Receiving	Jeremy Scott	3 receptions, 121 yards, TD
Georgia State	Passing	Cameran Brown	19/33, 241 yards, 4 TD, INT
Georgia State	Rushing	Jordon Simmons	11 carries, 78 yards
Georgia State	Receiving	Ted Hurst	5 receptions, 110 yards, 2 TD

=== at Coastal Carolina ===
Georgia State Panthers (1–7) at Coastal Carolina Chanticleers (5–3) – Game summary

Quarter	1	2	3	4	Total
Panthers	14	0	0	13	27
Chanticleers	14	9	10	7	40

at Brooks Stadium • Conway, SC

- Date: November 8, 2025
- Game time: 4:00 p.m. EST
- Game weather: Sunny • Temperature: 77 °F (25 °C) • Wind: NE 7 mph
- Game attendance: 18,878
- Referee: Steven Robinson
- TV announcers (ESPN+): Sam Weiderhaft (play-by-play), Ricky Sapp (analyst) and Haley Nitsche (sideline)
- Box score, Recap

Game information

First quarter

- (11:34) CCU – Samari Collier 85-yard run, Kian Afrookhteh kick (Drive: 1 play, 85 yards, 0:13; Coastal Carolina 7–0)
- (5:07) GAST – Cameran Brown 1-yard run, Liam Rickman kick (Drive: 13 plays, 75 yards, 6:27; Tied 7–7)
- (1:36) CCU – Robby Washington 16-yard pass from Samari Collier, Kian Afrookhteh kick (Drive: 8 plays, 75 yards, 3:31; Coastal Carolina 14–7)
- (0:56) GAST – Grant Hollier 8-yard pass from Cameran Brown, Liam Rickman kick (Drive: 3 plays, 65 yards, 0:40; Tied 14–14)

Second quarter

- (11:36) CCU – Kian Afrookhteh 30-yard field goal (Drive: 10 plays, 62 yards, 4:20; Coastal Carolina 17–14)
- (6:47) CCU – Kian Afrookhteh 34-yard field goal (Drive: 8 plays, 28 yards, 2:49; Coastal Carolina 20–14)
- (0:12) CCU – Kian Afrookhteh 28-yard field goal (Drive: 6 plays, 28 yards, 2:17; Coastal Carolina 23–14)

Third quarter

- (9:39) CCU – Philippe Laforge 47-yard field goal (Drive: 4 plays, -4 yards, 1:44; Coastal Carolina 26–14)
- (1:41) CCU – Karmello English 3-yard pass from Samari Collier, Philippe Laforge kick (Drive: 12 plays, 80 yards, 5:52; Coastal Carolina 33–14)

Fourth quarter

- (11:35) CCU – Karmello English 31-yard pass from Samari Collier, Kian Afrookhteh kick (Drive: 5 plays, 45 yards, 1:56; Coastal Carolina 40–14)
- (7:42) GAST – Jordon Simmons 1-yard run, two-point pass conversion attempt failed (Drive: 9 plays, 75 yards, 3:53; Coastal Carolina 40–20)
- (6:41) GAST – Ted Hurst 9-yard pass from TJ Finley, Liam Rickman kick (Drive: 3 plays, 59 yards, 0:58; Coastal Carolina 40–27)

Statistics	GAST	CCU
First downs	20	19
Plays–yards	75–423	65–444
Rushes–yards	37–130	47–324
Passing yards	293	120
Passing: Comp–Att–Int	25-38-1	11-18-0
Turnovers	2	0
Time of possession	30:56	29:04

Team	Category	Player	Statistics
Georgia State	Passing	TJ Finley	16/26, 177 yards, TD, INT
Georgia State	Rushing	Jordan Simmons	20 carries, 99 yards, TD
Georgia State	Receiving	Ted Hurst	10 receptions, 165 yards, TD
Coastal Carolina	Passing	Samari Collier	11/18, 120 yards, 3 TD
Coastal Carolina	Rushing	Samari Collier	10 carries, 123 yards, TD
Coastal Carolina	Receiving	Karmello English	4 receptions, 63 yards, 2 TD

=== Marshall ===
Marshall Thundering Herd (4–5) at Georgia State Panthers (1–8) – Game summary

Quarter	1	2	3	4	Total
Thundering Herd	7	14	0	9	30
Panthers	7	3	8	0	18

at Center Parc Stadium • Atlanta, GA

- Date: November 15, 2025
- Game time: 2:00 p.m. EDT
- Game weather: Sunny • Temperature: 72 °F (22 °C)
- Game attendance: 12,871
- Referee: Scott Broadway
- TV announcers (ESPN+): Matt Stewart (play-by-play) and Sam Crenshaw (analyst)

Game information

First quarter

- (13:05) GAST – Jordon Simmons 92-yard run, Liam Rickman kick (Drive: 2 plays, 92 yards, 0:18; Georgia State 7–0)
- (1:50) MRSH – Michael Allen 4-yard run, Lorcan Quinn kick (Drive: 7 plays, 85 yards, 2:38; Tied 7–7)

Second quarter

- (5:30) MRSH – Demarcus Lacey 5-yard pass from Carlos Del Rio-Wilson, Lorcan Quinn kick (Drive: 9 plays, 71 yards, 4:38; Marshall 14–7)
- (0:46) MRSH – Toby Payne 26-yard pass from Carlos Del Rio-Wilson, Lorcan Quinn kick (Drive: 8 plays, 90 yards, 2:05; Marshall 21–7)
- (0:00) GAST – Braeden McAllister 60-yard field goal (Drive: 7 plays, 32 yards, 0:46; Marshall 21–10)

Third quarter

- (3:23) GAST – Grant Hollier 2-yard pass from T. J. Finley, Jordan Simmons pass from T. J. Finley (Drive: 15 plays, 96 yards, 8:50; Marshall 21–18)

Fourth quarter

- (14:17) MRSH – Lorcan Quinn 30-yard field goal (Drive: 8 plays, 55 yards, 4:02; Marshall 24–18)
- (6:38) MRSH – Adrian Norton 29-yard pass from Carlos Del Rio-Wilson, Carlos Del Rio-Wilson pass failed (Drive: 8 plays, 97 yards, 3:45; Marshall 30–18)

Statistics	MRSH	GAST
First downs	24	21
Plays–yards	61–489	76–409
Rushes–yards	34–168	35–158
Passing yards	321	251
Passing: Comp–Att–Int	22–27–0	25–41–2
Turnovers	0	3
Time of possession	27:27	32:33

Team	Category	Player	Statistics
Marshall	Passing	Carlos Del Rio-Wilson	22/27, 321 yards, 3 TD
Marshall	Rushing	Carlos Del Rio-Wilson	17 carries, 97 yards
Marshall	Receiving	Toby Payne	5 receptions, 110 yards, TD
Georgia State	Passing	T. J. Finley	25/39, 251 yards, TD, 2 INT
Georgia State	Rushing	Jordon Simmons	19 carries, 164 yards, TD
Georgia State	Receiving	Ted Hurst	7 receptions, 74 yards

=== at Troy ===
Georgia State Panthers (1–9) at Troy Trojans (6–4) – Game summary

Quarter	1	2	3	4	Total
Panthers	0	6	6	7	19
Trojans	0	10	7	14	31

at Veterans Memorial Stadium Stadium • Troy, AL

- Date: November 22, 2025
- Game time: 4:00 p.m. EDT
- Game weather: Cloudy • Temperature: 79 °F (26 °C) • Wind: W 9 mph
- Referee: Trennis Livingston
- TV announcers (ESPN+): Will Kollmeyer (play-by-play), Ben Stanfield (analyst) and Rosie Langello (sideline)

Game information

First quarter

- No scoring plays.

Second quarter

- (13:29) GAST – Liam Rickman 34-yard field goal (Drive: 8 plays, 33 yards, 2:47; Georgia State 3–0)
- (7:23) TROY – Scott Taylor Renfroe 28-yard field goal (Drive: 13 plays, 65 yards, 6:10; Tied 3–3)
- (1:15) TROY – Ethan Conner 26-yard pass from Goose Crowder, Scott Taylor Renfroe kick (Drive: 4 plays, 45 yards, 0:22; Troy 10–3)
- (0:00) GAST – Liam Rickman 47-yard field goal (Drive: 6 plays, 46 yards, 1:15; Troy 10–6)

Third quarter

- (9:26) TROY – Ethan Conner 39-yard pass from Goose Crowder, Scott Taylor Renfroe kick (Drive: 8 plays, 73 yards, 2:24; Troy 17–6)
- (3:29) GAST – Branson Robinson 4-yard run, two-point pass conversion attempt failed (Drive: 12 plays, 75 yards, 5:57; Troy 17–12)

Fourth quarter

- (12:01) TROY – DJ Epps 10-yard pass from Goose Crowder, Scott Taylor Renfroe kick (Drive: 9 plays, 49 yards, 3:08; Troy 24–12)
- (9:00) GAST – Javon Robinson 17-yard pass from Christian Veilleux, Liam Rickman kick (Drive: 7 plays, 81 yards, 2:46; Troy 24–19)
- (6:25) TROY – DJ Epps 35-yard pass from Goose Crowder, Scott Taylor Renfroe kick (Drive: 6 plays, 70 yards, 2:19; Troy 31–19)

Statistics	GAST	TROY
First downs	26	19
Plays–yards	85–516	75–423
Rushes–yards	34–156	32–62
Passing yards	360	361
Passing: Comp–Att–Int	25–51–1	27–43–0
Turnovers	1	1
Time of possession	29:55	30:05

Team	Category	Player	Statistics
Georgia State	Passing	Christian Veilleux	19/38, 303 yards, TD, INT
Georgia State	Rushing	Jordon Simmons	17 carries, 67 yards
Georgia State	Receiving	Javon Robinson	7 receptions, 142 yards, TD
Troy	Passing	Goose Crowder	27/43, 361 yards, 4 TD
Troy	Rushing	Tae Meadows	13 carries, 35 yards
Troy	Receiving	DJ Epps	8 receptions, 103 yards, 2 TD

=== at Old Dominion ===
Georgia State Panthers (1–10) at Old Dominion Monarchs (8–3) – Game summary

Quarter	1	2	3	4	Total
Panthers	0	10	0	0	10
Monarchs	0	10	17	0	27

at S.B. Ballard Stadium • Norfolk, VA

- Date: November 29, 2025
- Game time: 2:00 PM EST
- Game weather: Sunny • Temperature: 44 °F (7 °C) • Wind: SE 8 mph
- Game attendance: 17,126
- Referee: Brandon Kirkland
- TV announcers (ESPN+): Scott Jackson (play-by-play) and Andy Mashaw (analyst)

Game information

First quarter

- No scoring plays.

Second quarter

- (11:26) GAST – Derrick Avery Jr. 4-yard pass from Christian Veilleux, Liam Rickman kick (Drive: 5 plays, 67 yards, 2:00; Georgia State 7–0)
- (9:56) GAST – Liam Rickman 36-yard field goal (Drive: 6 plays, 6 yards, 1:19; Georgia State 10–0)
- (5:34) ODU – Nathanial Eichner 19-yard field goal (Drive: 11 plays, 70 yards, 4:09; Georgia State 10–3)
- (4:16) ODU – Devin Roche 9-yard run, Nathanial Eichner kick (Drive: 2 plays, 20 yards, 0:27; Tied 10–10)

Third quarter

- (10:46) ODU – Nathanial Eichner 22-yard field goal (Drive: 6 plays, 29 yards, 2:08; Old Dominion 13–10)
- (6:03) ODU – Devin Roche 3-yard run, Nathanial Eichner kick (Drive: 7 plays, 94 yards, 2:55; Old Dominion 20–10)
- (0:59) ODU – Colton Joseph 14-yard run, Nathanial Eichner kick (Drive: 6 plays, 80 yards, 3:17; Old Dominion 27–10)

Fourth quarter

- No scoring plays.

Statistics	GAST	ODU
First downs	15	27
Plays–yards	67–283	76–409
Rushes–yards	30–129	54–303
Passing yards	154	106
Passing: Comp–Att–Int	18–37–1	9–22–1
Turnovers	1	2
Time of possession	27:32	32:28

Team	Category	Player	Statistics
Georgia State	Passing	Christian Veilleux	18/37, 154 yards, TD, INT
Georgia State	Rushing	Jordon Simmons	17 carries, 88 yards
Georgia State	Receiving	Ted Hurst	7 receptions, 76 yards
Old Dominion	Passing	Colton Joseph	9/22, 106 yards, INT
Old Dominion	Rushing	Devin Roche	21 carries, 137 yards, 2 TD
Old Dominion	Receiving	Ja'Cory Thomas	4 receptions, 64 yards

== Roster ==
2025 Georgia State Panthers football team roster
Players
Coaches
Offense

Pos.	#	Name	Class
TE	0	Camden Overton-Howard	Sr
WR	1	Ted Hurst	Sr
RB	2	DJay Braswell	RSo
WR	3	Leo Blackburn	RSr
WR	5	Javon Robinson	Jr
TE	6	Wesley Campbell VI	RJr
QB	7	PJ Hatter	RSo
QB	8	Cameran Brown	RJr
RB	9	Jordon Simmons	RSr
WR	10	D. J. Riles	RJr
QB	11	Christian Veilleux	RSr
QB	12	Jadon Olafsson	Fr
WR	13	Derrick Avery Jr.	Fr
QB	14	TJ Stanley	Fr
WR	16	Jaylin Marshall	Jr
WR	17	Zaire Thornton	RSr
WR	18	D'Ontae Fulton	Fr
RB	20	Jamal Bing Jr.	RSo
RB	21	TJ Peyton	Fr
RB	22	Branson Robinson	RJr
RB	23	D. J. Murray Jr.	RFr
RB	25	Tayo Ashadele	Fr
RB	28	Phoenix Moss	RFr
RB	30	Rashad Amos	RSr
RB	32	Ladanian Martin	Fr
RB	33	Ty McKey	Sr
RB	34	Timothe Dorce	RJr
TE	35	Avion McBride	RJr
TE	36	Chris Manuel	RJr
WR	38	Khalil Quinn	Fr
TE	44	Kyle Mullenix	Fr
OL	52	Donovan Funsch	So
OL	53	Malik Jackson	RFr
OL	54	Tyhler Williams	Jr
OL	55	Obadiah Obasuyi	RSo
OL	56	Deandre Duffus	RSo
OL	58	Derrell Bailey Jr.	RSr
OL	60	Dominic Johnson	RFr
OL	62	Jeff Burton	RJr
OL	65	Hunter Britt	Fr
OT	66	Braylin Roberts	Fr
OL	68	Mason Cook	RSr
OT	69	Jeremiah McCrimmon	RJr
OL	70	Alec Johnson	RJr
OL	71	Aidan Andrews	Fr
OL	74	Pherleski Martin	Fr
OL	75	Neil Sledge	RSo
OT	76	Daysan Ranew	RJr
WR	80	Ahmed Souare	Fr
WR	81	Myles Abernathy	RFr
WR	82	Kyle Washington	Fr
WR	83	Jamari Miller	Fr
TE	84	Breylen Gilbert	RFr
TE	85	Grant Hollier	Fr
WR	86	Keron Milton	RFr
WR	87	Austin McGee	RFr
TE	88	Lane Wadle	So
WR	89	Amari Powell	RFr

Defense

Pos.	#	Name	Class
DT	0	Jonah Reeder	Jr
ILB	1	Damaine Wilson	So
CB	2	Deuce Fillmore	RJr
S	3	Demonte Gaston	RJr
S	4	D-Icey Hopkins	RJr
CB	5	Tyler Scott	RSo
S	6	Jordan Huff	RSr
S	7	Deuce Walker	So
DT	8	Dorian Royal	RSr
OLB	9	Marlin Dean	RJr
DT	10	Henry Bryant III	RSr
DE	11	Ian Mathews	RSr
CB	12	Sam McCall	RJr
DE	13	Jabriel Rhodes-Nelson	Jr
CB	14	Isaiah Dunson	RSr
DT	16	Bishop Thomas	RJr
S	17	Joseph Holt	Fr
CB	18	Chams Diagne	RJr
ILB	20	Coby Owens	So
S	21	Derrick Maxey III	RSo
S	22	Ty Snead	Fr
S	23	Jaylen Jones	RSo
S	24	Chandler Jordan	Fr
ILB	25	Josiah Robinson	RJr
ILB	27	Tyler Moore	Fr
CB	28	Bernard Causey	RFr
ILB	30	Kedrick Walker	Jr
CB	31	Remez Lockhart	RJr
CB	32	Tyson McCrary	Fr
ILB	33	Zachary Davis	Fr
DE	34	Cayden Adkins	Fr
S	35	Kyle Veasley	RJr
ILB	36	Brent Washington	RFr
CB	37	Gary Turner	RJr
ILB	38	Christon Jones	Fr
DE	40	Sir Mells	RJr
CB	41	Adrian Floyd	Fr
CB	42	Tylan Smith	RFr
OLB	45	Kelan Butler	Fr
ILB	46	Sean Ademokun	Fr
ILB	47	Chandler Covington	Fr
S	48	Dylan Dennard	Sr
OLB	49	Zavier Carter	RSr
DT	52	Alex Mullings	Fr
ILB	55	Antonio Wesley	RFr
DT	56	Fuches Lewis II	RSr
DT	57	Abdul Mohammed	So
DT	59	Gabriel Chigwere	So
DT	90	Noah Nelson	RJr
OLB	91	Zion Lawson	Fr
DE	95	Richard Kramer	So
DT	96	Jalen Jordan	RSo
DT	98	Jaden Roper	Jr
DT	99	Jartavius Flounoy	Fr

Special teams

Pos.	#	Name	Class
PK	15	Braeden McAlister	RJr
LS	43	Joe Laterza	Sr
LS	47	Michael Fitzmeyer	Jr
P	91	Reed Chandley	So
PK	92	Liam Rickman	RJr
P	93	Bo Gaines	Jr
LS	97	Spencer Radnoti	RFr

Head coach

- Dell McGee

Coordinators/assistant coaches

- Carter Blount – Associate head coach, special teams, director of quality control
- Hue Jackson – Offensive coordinator
- Travis Pearson – Defensive coordinator
- John Adams – Assistant coach, nickels
- Dameyune Craig – Assistant coach, wide receivers
- Enrique Davis – Assistant coach, running backs
- Glenn Ford Jr. – Assistant coach, cornerbacks
- Jeremy Hawkins – Assistant coach, defensive line
- Troy Kruchten – Assistant coach, outside linebackers
- Bryant Ross – Assistant coach, offensive line
- Jes Sutherland – Assistant coach, tight ends
- Juwan Taylor – Assistant coach, inside linebackers
- C. J. Wilford – Assistant coach, safeties
- Ryan Williams – Assistant coach, quarterbacks
- K. J. Florence – Head strength coach
- Jim Durning – Assistant football strength coach
- Tanner Hawthorne – Assistant football strength coach
- Kam Edwards – Assistant football strength coach

Legend

- (C) Team captain
- (S) Suspended
- (I) Ineligible
- Injured
- Redshirt

Roster
Last update: 27 July 2025
