= Ted Hurst =

American football player (born 2004)

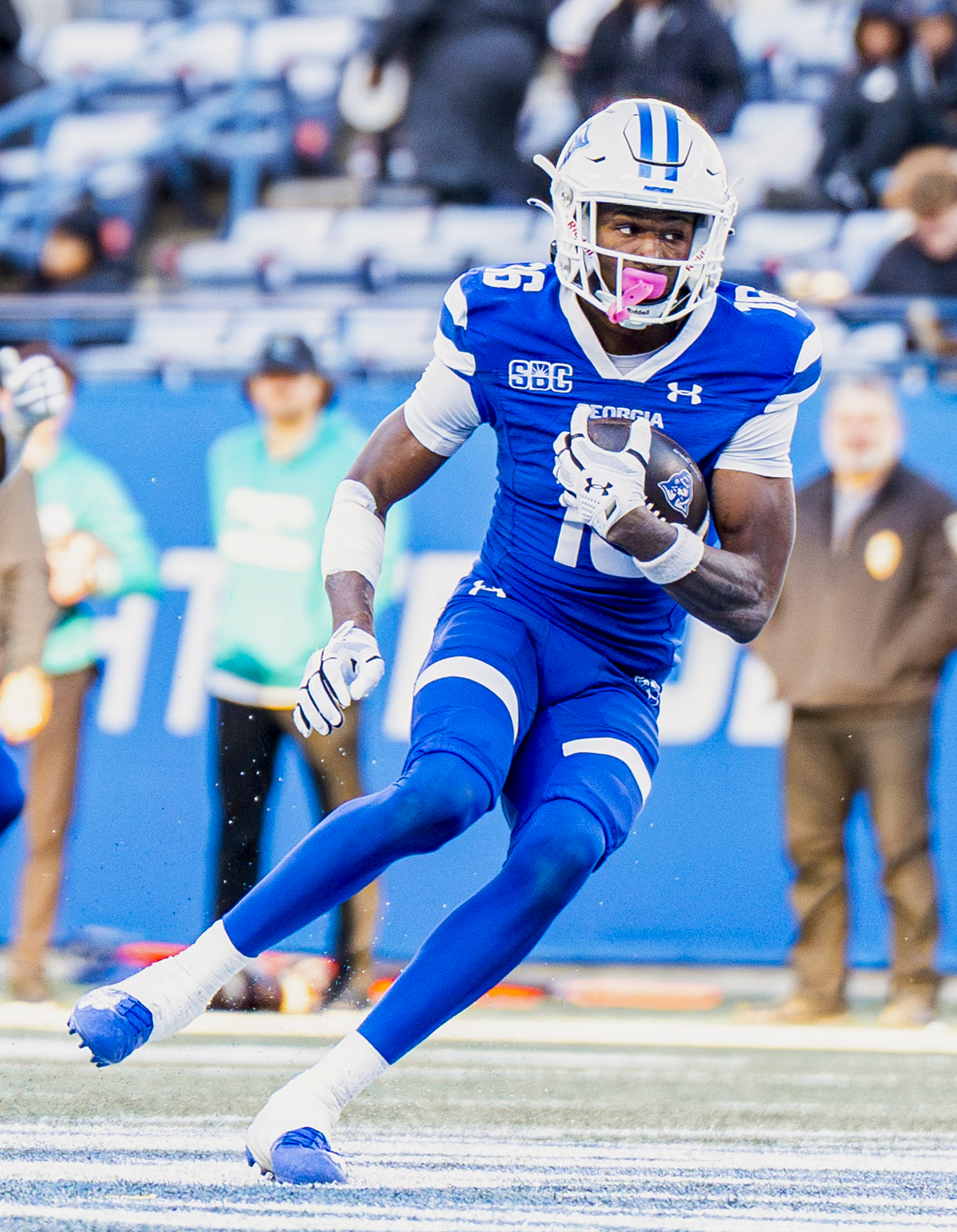
- Hurst with Georgia State in 2024

No. 17 – Tampa Bay Buccaneers
- Position: Wide receiver
- Roster status: Active

Personal information
- Born: July 2, 2004 (age 22); Augusta, Georgia, U.S.
- Listed height: 6 ft 4 in (1.93 m)
- Listed weight: 206 lb (93 kg)

Career information
- High school: Sol C. Johnson (Savannah, Georgia)
- College: Valdosta State (2022–2023); Georgia State (2024–2025)
- NFL draft: 2026: 3rd round, 84th overall pick

Career history
- Tampa Bay Buccaneers (2026–present)

Awards and highlights
- First-team All-Sun Belt (2025); Second-team All-Sun Belt (2024)

Career NFL statistics as of Week 7, 2026
- Receptions: 11
- Receiving yards: 168
- Receiving touchdowns: 1
- Stats at Pro Football Reference

Ted Morris Hurst III (born July 2, 2004) is an American professional football wide receiver for the Tampa Bay Buccaneers of the National Football League (NFL). He played college football for the Valdosta State Blazers and Georgia State Panthers and was selected by the Buccaneers in the third round of the 2026 NFL draft.

== Early life ==
Hurst was born on July 2, 2004, in Augusta, Georgia, and grew up in Savannah, Georgia. Hurst attended Sol C. Johnson High School in Savannah. He was a first-team All-Region his senior year. He committed to Valdosta State University to play college football. Hurst also played basketball in high school.

== College career ==
Hurst played at Valdosta State in 2022 and 2023, recording 60 receptions for 1,027 yards and 10 touchdowns. After the 2023 season, he entered the transfer portal and transferred to Georgia State University. In his first year at Georgia State in 2024, he became the teams number one receiver, finishing with 56 receptions for 961 yards and a school record nine touchdowns. As a senior in 2025, he again was the teams leading receiver with 71 receptions for 1,004 yards and six touchdowns.

=== Statistics ===
Year	Team	GP	Receiving			
Year	Team	GP	Rec	Yds	Avg	TD
2022	Valdosta State	11	22	431	19.6	6
2023	Valdosta State	14	38	596	15.7	4
2024	Georgia State	12	56	961	17.2	9
2025	Georgia State	12	71	1,004	14.1	6
Career		49	187	2,992	16.0	25

== Professional career ==
Pre-draft measurables
Height	Weight	Arm length	Hand span	Wingspan	40-yard dash	10-yard split	20-yard split	Vertical jump	Broad jump
6 ft 3 7/8 in (1.93 m)	206 lb (93 kg)	32 5/8 in (0.83 m)	9 3/4 in (0.25 m)	6 ft 7 7/8 in (2.03 m)	4.42 s	1.55 s	2.59 s	36.5 in (0.93 m)	11 ft 3 in (3.43 m)
All values from NFL Combine

Hurst was selected by the Tampa Bay Buccaneers in the third round with the 84th overall pick of the 2026 NFL draft.
