= 2024 Oregon State Beavers football team =

American college football season

2024 Oregon State Beavers football
- Conference: Pac-12 Conference
- Record: 5–7 (1–0 Pac-12)
- Head coach: Trent Bray (1st season)
- Offensive coordinator: Ryan Gunderson (1st season)
- Offensive scheme: Pro-style
- Defensive coordinator: Keith Heyward (1st season)
- Base defense: Multiple 4–2–5
- Home stadium: Reser Stadium

2024 Pac-12 Conference football standings
	Conf.			Overall
Team	W		L	W		L
Oregon State	1	–	0	5	–	7
Washington State	0	–	1	8	–	5

The 2024 Oregon State Beavers football team represented Oregon State University in the Pac-12 Conference during the 2024 NCAA Division I FBS football season. Led by first-year head coach Trent Bray, the Beavers played their home games on campus at Reser Stadium in Corvallis, Oregon.

== Offseason ==
Prior to the 2023 Pac-12 Conference football season, ten of the Pac-12 Conference members announced that they intended to join other conferences in 2024, leaving Oregon State and Washington State as the only remaining conference members. Following several months of legal maneuvering over conference assets and liabilities, all schools reached a settlement in which Oregon State and Washington State retained control over the conference. The remaining two arranged a scheduling partnership with the Mountain West Conference to complete their 2024 football schedules, and they will meet on November 23 in Corvallis.

=== Coaching staff changes ===
==== Coaching staff departures ====
Name	Position	New team	New position
Jonathan Smith	Head coach	Michigan State	Head coach
Brian Lindgren	Offensive coordinator	Michigan State	Offensive coordinator
Keith Bhonapha	Assistant head coach/running backs coach	Michigan State	Assistant head coach/running backs coach
Jim Michalczik	Associate head coach/running game coordinator/offensive line coach	Michigan State	Associate head coach/running game coordinator/offensive line coach
Brian Wozniak	Tight ends coach	Michigan State	Tight ends coach
Blue Adams	Defensive backs coach	Michigan State	Defensive backs coach

=== Transfers ===
==== Transfers out ====
The Beavers lost twelve players to the transfer portal.

Name	Number	Pos.	Height	Weight	Year	Hometown	Transfer to
Josh McCormick	#39	K	5"10	160	Junior	Austin, Texas	TBD
DJ Uiagalelei	#5	QB	6"5	245	Junior	Bellflower, California	Florida State
Aidan Chiles	#0	QB	6"4	195	Freshman	Downey, California	Michigan State
Easton Mascarenas-Arnold	#5	LB	6"0	215	Junior	Mission Viejo, California	USC
Akili Arnold	#0	S	5"11	190	Junior	Lake Forest, California	USC
Jack Velling	#88	TE	6"5	225	Sophomore	Seattle, Washington	Michigan State
Jake Overman	#81	TE	6"4	244	Junior	Yorba Linda, California	Pittsburgh
Jermod McCoy	#23	CB	6"0	180	Freshman	Whitehouse, Texas	Tennessee
Atticus Sappington	#36	K	5"10	188	Sophomore	Portland, Oregon	Oregon
Tanner Miller	#61	IOL	6"1	271	Junior	Valencia, California	Michigan State
Silas Bolden	#7	WR	5"10	175	Junior	Rancho Cucamonga, California	Texas
Sione Lolohea	#8	DL	6"3	270	Junior	San Bernardino, CA	Florida State
Damien Martinez	#6	RB	6"0	237	Sophomore	Lewisville, TX	Miami (FL)

==== Transfers in ====
The Beavers added ten players via transfer.

Name	Number	Pos.	Height	Weight	Year	Hometown	Transfer from
Van Wells	#55	IOL	6"2	290	Sophomore	Houston, Texas	Colorado
Nick Norris	#92	DL	6"5	262	Junior	Fort Morgan, Colorado	Northern Colorado
Anthony Hankerson	#9	RB	5"9	190	Sophomore	Boynton Beach, Florida	Colorado
Mason White	#13	CB	6"0	152	Junior	Van Nuys, California	TCU
Gerad Lichtenhan	#69	IOL	6"9	345	Junior	Davis, California	Colorado
Anthony Jones	#4	LB	6"3	235	Freshman	Las Vegas, Nevada	Indiana
Amipeleasi Fifita	#97	DL	6"6	335	Junior	Lihue, Hawaii	Houston
Gevani McCoy	#4	QB	6"1	160	Sophomore	Baldwin Hills, California	Idaho
Gabarri Johnson	#13	QB	6"0	201	Freshman	Tacoma, Washington	Missouri
Darrius Clemons	#0	WR	6"3	212	Sophomore	Portland, Oregon	Michigan

=== Players drafted into the NFL ===
Round	Pick	NFL team	Player	Position
1	14	New Orleans Saints	Taliese Fuaga	OT
5	142	Indianapolis Colts	Anthony Gould	WR
5	169	Green Bay Packers	Kitan Oladapo	S

== Schedule ==
Date	Time	Opponent	Site	TV	Result	Attendance
August 31	3:30 p.m.	Idaho State*	Reser Stadium; Corvallis, OR	The CW	W 38–15	31,013
September 7	7:30 p.m.	at San Diego State*	Snapdragon Stadium; San Diego, CA	CBSSN	W 21–0	25,318
September 14	12:30 p.m.	No. 9 Oregon*	Reser Stadium; Corvallis, OR (rivalry)	FOX	L 14–49	38,419
September 21	5:30 p.m.	Purdue*	Reser Stadium; Corvallis, OR	The CW	W 38–21	34,340
October 5	3:30 p.m.	Colorado State*	Reser Stadium; Corvallis, OR	The CW	W 39–31 ^{2OT}	36,433
October 12	4:30 p.m.	at Nevada*	Mackay Stadium; Reno, NV	CBSSN	L 37–42	21,541
October 19	7:00 p.m.	UNLV*^{†}	Reser Stadium; Corvallis, OR	The CW	L 25–33	35,195
October 26	1:00 p.m.	at California*	California Memorial Stadium; Berkeley, CA	ESPN2	L 7–44	33,090
November 9	12:30 p.m.	San Jose State*	Reser Stadium; Corvallis, OR	The CW	L 13–24	37,187
November 16	12:30 p.m.	at Air Force*	Falcon Stadium; Colorado Springs, CO	CBSSN	L 0–28	21,385
November 23	4:00 p.m.	Washington State	Reser Stadium; Corvallis, OR	The CW	W 41–38	38,008
November 29	9:00 a.m.	at No. 11 Boise State*	Albertsons Stadium; Boise, ID	FOX	L 18–34	37,264
*Non-conference game; ^{†}Homecoming; Rankings from AP Poll - Released prior to game; All times are in Pacific time; Source:

== Game summaries ==
=== vs Idaho State (FCS) ===
Idaho State Bengals (0–0) vs Oregon State Beavers (0–0) – Game summary

Quarter	1	2	3	4	Total
Bengals (FCS)	9	0	6	0	15
Beavers	7	10	14	7	38

at Reser Stadium • Corvallis, OR

- Date: August 31, 2024
- Game time: 3:30 p.m.
- Game weather: Sunny, 92 °F (33 °C)
- Game attendance: 31,013
- Referee: John Love
- TV announcers (The CW): Thom Brennaman (play-by-play), Max Browne (analyst), Michael Bumpus (sideline reporter)

Game information

First quarter

- (5:55) OSU – Anthony Hankerson 15-yard run, Everett Hayes kick (Drive: 6 plays, 63 yards, 2:42; Oregon State 7–0)
- (1:09) IDST – Team safety (Oregon State 7–2)
- (0:00) IDST – Christian Frederickson 35-yard pass from Kobe Tracy, Gabe Panikowski kick (Drive: 3 plays, 59 yards, 1:03; Idaho State 9–7)

Second quarter

- (9:34) OSU – Everett Hayes 32-yard field goal (Drive: 12 plays, 51 yards, 5:26; Oregon State 10–9)
- (0:27) OSU – Anthony Hankerson 6-yard run, Everett Hayes kick (Drive: 11 plays, 71 yards, 4:14; Oregon State 17–9)

Third quarter

- (10:39) OSU – David Wells Jr. 55-yard pass from Gevani McCoy, Everett Hayes kick (Drive: 1 play, 55 yards, 0:09; Oregon State 24–9)
- (3:17) OSU – Jam Griffin 22-yard run, Everett Hayes kick (Drive: 8 plays, 80 yards, 4:01; Oregon State 31–9)
- (1:04) IDST – Michael Shulikov 9-yard pass from Hunter Hays, kick failed (Drive: 7 plays, 87 yards, 2:08; Oregon State 31–15)

Fourth quarter

- (9:31) OSU – Jam Griffin 20-yard run, Everett Hayes kick (Drive: 11 plays, 75 yards, 6:33; Oregon State 38–15)

Statistics	IDST	ORST
First downs	22	29
Total yards	311	510
Rushing yards	16–82	58–362
Passing yards	229	148
Passing: Comp–Att–Int	23–45–2	11–14–0
Time of possession	22:31	37:29

Team	Category	Player	Statistics
Idaho State	Passing	Kobe Tracy	9/14, 114 yards, TD
Idaho State	Rushing	Keoua Kauhi	4 carries, 39 yards
Idaho State	Receiving	Christian Frederickson	5 receptions, 68 yards, TD
Oregon State	Passing	Gevani McCoy	9/10, 114 yards, TD
Oregon State	Rushing	Jam Griffin	20 carries, 160 yards, 2 TD
Oregon State	Receiving	David Wells Jr.	2 receptions, 63 yards, TD

=== at San Diego State ===
Oregon State Beavers (1–0) at San Diego State Aztecs (1–0) – Game summary

Quarter	1	2	3	4	Total
Beavers	7	0	0	14	21
Aztecs	0	0	0	0	0

at Snapdragon Stadium • San Diego, CA

- Date: September 7, 2024
- Game time: 7:30 p.m.
- Game weather: Clear, 87 °F (31 °C)
- Game attendance: 25,318
- Referee: Cal McNeill
- TV announcers (CBS Sports Network): Rich Waltz (play-by-play), Robert Turbin (analyst), Amanda Guerra (sideline reporter)

Game information

First quarter

- (11:47) OSU – Jam Griffin 16-yard run, Everett Hayes kick (Drive: 5 plays, 53 yards, 1:53; Oregon State 7–0)

Second quarter

- No scoring plays

Third quarter

- No scoring plays

Fourth quarter

- (14:53) OSU – Anthony Hankerson 15-yard run, Everett Hayes kick (Drive: 13 plays, 98 yards, 8:04; Oregon State 14–0)
- (4:36) OSU – Bryce Caufield 21-yard pass from Gevani McCoy, Everett Hayes kick (Drive: 5 plays, 42 yards, 2:58; Oregon State 21–0)

Statistics	ORST	SDSU
First downs	23	7
Total yards	420	179
Rushing yards	51–237	25–72
Passing yards	183	107
Passing: Comp–Att–Int	17–27–0	11–24–0
Time of possession	41:07	18:53

Team	Category	Player	Statistics
Oregon State	Passing	Gevani McCoy	16/26, 181 yards, TD
Oregon State	Rushing	Jam Griffin	18 carries, 89 yards, TD
Oregon State	Receiving	Trent Walker	8 receptions, 92 yards
San Diego State	Passing	Danny O'Neil	11/24, 107 yards
San Diego State	Rushing	Marquez Cooper	13 carries, 53 yards
San Diego State	Receiving	Louis Brown IV	2 receptions, 45 yards

=== vs No. 9 Oregon (rivalry) ===
No. 9 Oregon Ducks (2–0) vs Oregon State Beavers (2–0) – Game summary

Quarter	1	2	3	4	Total
No. 9 Ducks	7	15	10	17	49
Beavers	7	7	0	0	14

at Reser Stadium • Corvallis, OR

- Date: September 14, 2024
- Game time: 12:30 p.m.
- Game weather: Sunny • Temperature: 68 °F (20 °C) • Wind: 4 mph W
- Game attendance: 38,419
- Referee: Mark Kluczunski
- TV announcers (Fox): Jason Benetti (play-by-play), Brock Huard (analyst), Allison Williams (sideline reporter)

Game information

First quarter

- (6:39) ORE – Jordan James 4-yard run, Atticus Sappington kick (Drive: 8 plays, 74 yards, 3:25; Oregon 7–0)
- (0:01) OSU – Anthony Hankerson 6-yard run, Everett Hayes kick (Drive: 13 plays, 75 yards, 6:38; Tied 7–7)

Second quarter

- (13:36) ORE – Dillon Gabriel 54-yard run, Kenyon Sadiq rush (Drive: 4 plays, 75 yards, 1:25; Oregon 15–7)
- (6:43) ORE – Traeshon Holden 20-yard pass from Dillon Gabriel, Atticus Sappington kick (Drive: 8 plays, 84 yards, 3:52; Oregon 22–7)
- (0:15) OSU – Anthony Hankerson 1-yard run, Everett Hayes kick (Drive: 14 plays, 81 yards, 6:22; Oregon 22–14)

Third quarter

- (10:25) ORE – Atticus Sappington 25-yard field goal (Drive: 10 plays, 68 yards, 4:35; Oregon 25–14)
- (4:36) ORE – Jordan James 1-yard run, Atticus Sappington kick (Drive: 9 plays, 75 yards, 3:38; Oregon 32–14)

Fourth quarter

- (14:52) ORE – Noah Whittington 27-yard run, Atticus Sappington kick (Drive: 6 plays, 82 yards, 3:14; Oregon 39–14)
- (10:43) ORE – Jayden Limar 65-yard pass from Dillon Gabriel, Atticus Sappington kick (Drive: 6 plays, 80 yards, 1:42; Oregon 46–14)
- (4:34) ORE – Atticus Sappington 39-yard field goal (Drive: 7 plays, 33 yards, 3:46; Oregon 49–14)

Statistics	ORE	ORST
First downs	26	19
Total yards	546	309
Rushing yards	240	131
Passing yards	306	178
Passing: Comp–Att–Int	23–27–0	23–35–0
Time of possession	27:08	32:52

Team	Category	Player	Statistics
Oregon	Passing	Dillon Gabriel	20/24, 291 yards, 2 TD
Oregon	Rushing	Jordan James	12 carries, 86 yards, 2 TD
Oregon	Receiving	Tez Johnson	7 receptions, 110 yards
Oregon State	Passing	Gevani McCoy	22/34, 172 yards
Oregon State	Rushing	Anthony Hankerson	15 carries, 57 yards, 2 TD
Oregon State	Receiving	Trent Walker	8 receptions, 68 yards

=== vs Purdue ===
Purdue Boilermakers (1–1) vs Oregon State Beavers (2–1) – Game summary

Quarter	1	2	3	4	Total
Boilermakers	0	7	0	14	21
Beavers	7	10	7	14	38

at Reser Stadium • Corvallis, OR

- Date: September 21, 2024
- Game time: 5:30 p.m.
- Game weather: Sunny, 76 °F (24 °C)
- Game attendance: 34,340
- Referee: Mark Duddy
- TV announcers (The CW): Ted Robinson (play-by-play), Ryan Leaf (analyst), and Nigel Burton (sideline reporter)

Game information

First quarter

- ORST – Zakaih Saez 20-yard interception return (Everett Hayes kick), 7:37. Beavers 7–0.

Second quarter

- ORST – Anthony Hankerson 1-yard run (Everett Hayes kick), 14:14. Beavers 14–0. Drive: 12 plays, 71 yards, 7:34.
- PUR – Max Klare 32-yard pass from Hudson Card (Spencer Porath kick), 6:30. Beavers 14–7. Drive: 2 plays, 47 yards, 0:57.
- ORST – Everett Hayes 29-yard field goal, 0:03. Beavers 17–7. Drive: 11 plays, 81 yards, 2:33.

Third quarter

- ORST – Zachary Card 26-yard run (Everett Hayes kick), 0:50. Beavers 24–7. Drive: 4 plays, 50 yards, 2:05.

Fourth quarter

- PUR – Reggie Love III 2-yard run (Spencer Porath kick), 12:49. Beavers 24–14. Drive: 7 plays, 75 yards, 3:01.
- ORST – Jam Griffin 14-yard run (Everett Hayes kick), 9:57. Beavers 31–14. Drive: 6 plays, 75 yards, 2:52.
- PUR – Devin Mockobee 3-yard run (Spencer Porath kick), 6:59. Beavers 31–21. Drive: 6 plays, 75 yards, 2:58.
- ORST – Anthony Hankerson 12-yard run (Everett Hayes kick), 1:53. Beavers 38–21. Drive: 8 plays, 42 yards, 5:06.

Statistics	PUR	ORST
First downs	13	25
Total yards	319	445
Rushing yards	263	341
Passing yards	56	104
Passing: Comp–Att–Int	7–17–1	10–18–0
Time of possession	19:45	40:15

Team	Category	Player	Statistics
Purdue	Passing	Hudson Card	7/17, 56 yards, TD, INT
Purdue	Rushing	Devin Mockobee	16 carries, 168 yards, TD
Purdue	Receiving	Max Klare	2 receptions, 46 yards, TD
Oregon State	Passing	Gevani McCoy	10/18, 104 yards
Oregon State	Rushing	Jam Griffin	22 rushes, 137 yards, TD
Oregon State	Receiving	Trent Walker	3 receptions, 37 yards

=== vs Colorado State ===
Colorado State Rams (2–2) vs Oregon State Beavers (3–1) – Game summary

Quarter	1	2	3	4	OT	2OT	Total
Rams	7	3	0	14	7	0	31
Beavers	0	14	0	10	7	8	39

at Reser Stadium • Corvallis, OR

- Date: October 5, 2024
- Game time: 3:30 p.m.
- Game weather: Sunny, 70 °F (21 °C)
- Game attendance: 36,433
- Referee: Chris Wiggins
- TV announcers (The CW): Ted Robinson (play-by-play) and Ryan Leaf (analyst)

Game information

First quarter

- CSU – Justin Marshall 12-yard run (Jordan Noyes kick), 10:15. Rams 7–0. Drive: 1 play, 12 yards, 0:07.

Second quarter

- ORST – Gevani McCoy 29-yard run (Everett Hayes kick), 11:04. Tied 7–7. Drive: 10 plays, 82 yards, 4:44.
- CSU – Jordan Noyes 25-yard field goal, 5:13. Rams 10–7. Drive: 10 plays, 68 yards, 5:51.
- ORST – Anthony Hankerson 1-yard run (Everett Hayes kick), 0:03. Beavers 14–10. Drive: 13 plays, 70 yards, 5:01.

Third quarter

No scoring plays

Fourth quarter

- ORST – Gevani McCoy 7-yard run (Everett Hayes kick), 14:52. Beavers 21–10. Drive: 14 plays, 87 yards, 8:51.
- CSU – Tory Horton 10-yard pass from Brayden Fowler-Nicolosi (pass failed), 7:59. Beavers 21–16. Drive: 14 plays, 75 yards, 6:53.
- CSU – Avery Morrow 1-yard run (Tory Horton run), 1:56. Rams 24–21. Drive: 6 plays, 81 yards, 3:03.
- ORST – Everett Hayes 44-yard field goal, 0:20. Tied 24–24. Drive: 14 plays, 52 yards, 1:30.

Overtime

- CSU – Caleb Goodie 17-yard pass from Brayden Fowler-Nicolosi (Jordan Noyes kick). Rams 31–24. Drive: 3 plays, 25 yards.
- ORST – Gevani McCoy 19-yard run (Everett Hayes kick). Tied 31–31. Drive: 1 play, 19 yards.

Second overtime

- ORST – Anthony Hankerson 25-yard run (Gevani McCoy pass to Jermaine Terry II). Beavers 38–31. Drive: 8 plays, 14 yards.

Statistics	CSU	ORST
First downs	22	26
Total yards	439	398
Rushing yards	176	251
Passing yards	263	147
Passing: Comp–Att–Int	20–30–0	16–28–1
Time of possession	28:40	31:20

Team	Category	Player	Statistics
Colorado State	Passing	Brayden Fowler-Nicolosi	20/30, 263 yards, 2 TD
Colorado State	Rushing	Avery Morrow	25 carries, 140 yards, TD
Colorado State	Receiving	Tory Horton	9 receptions, 158 yards, TD
Oregon State	Passing	Gevani McCoy	16/28, 147 yards, INT
Oregon State	Rushing	Anthony Hankerson	26 carries, 113 yards, 2 TD
Oregon State	Receiving	Trent Walker	7 receptions, 55 yards

=== at Nevada ===
Oregon State Beavers (4–1) at Nevada Wolf Pack (2–4) – Game summary

Quarter	1	2	3	4	Total
Beavers	7	10	7	13	37
Wolf Pack	7	7	7	21	42

at Mackay Stadium • Reno, NV

- Date: October 12, 2024
- Game time: 4:30 p.m.
- Game weather: Sunny • Temperature: 72 °F (22 °C) • Wind: W at 7 miles per hour (11 km/h)
- Game attendance: 21,541
- Referee: Kenneth Ray
- TV announcers (CBS Sports Network): John Sadak (play-by-play) and Ross Tucker (analyst)

Game information

First quarter

- (10:48) OSU – Jake Reichle 3-yard run, Everett Hayes kick (Drive: 8 plays, 75 yards, 4:12; Oregon State 7–0)
- (7:51) NEV – Savion Red 33-yard run, Matthew Killam kick (Drive: 6 plays, 75 yards, 2:57; Tied 7–7)

Second quarter

- (10:44) NEV – Savion Red 5-yard run, Matthew Killam kick (Drive: 13 plays, 78 yards, 6:36; Nevada 14–7)
- (5:53) OSU – Everett Hayes 22-yard field goal (Drive: 10 plays, 71 yards, 4:51; Nevada 14–10)
- (0:38) OSU – Anthony Hankerson 18-yard run, Everett Hayes kick (Drive: 5 plays, 68 yards, 1:04; Oregon State 17–14)

Third quarter

- (11:04) OSU – Anthony Hankerson 8-yard run, Everett Hayes kick (Drive: 6 plays, 67 yards, 2:27; Oregon State 24–14)
- (5:58) NEV – Savion Red 7-yard run, Matthew Killam kick (Drive: 9 plays, 75 yards, 5:06; Oregon State 24–21)

Fourth quarter

- (13:37) NEV – Savion Red 6-yard run, Matthew Killam kick (Drive: 6 plays, 69 yards, 2:53; Nevada 28–24)
- (10:43) NEV – Kitan Crawford 52-yard interception, Matthew Killam kick (Nevada 35–24)
- (6:59) OSU – Anthony Hankerson 1-yard run (Drive: 11 plays, 75 yards, 3:44; Nevada 35–30)
- (3:57) NEV – Brendon Lewis 67-yard run, Matthew Killam kick (Drive: 3 plays, 80 yards, 1:03; Nevada 42–30)
- (1:57) OSU – Trent Walker 3-yard pass from Gevani McCoy, Everett Hayes kick (Drive: 8 plays, 75 yards, 2:01; Nevada 42–37)

Statistics	ORST	NEV
First downs	35	20
Total yards	562	422
Rushing yards	214	353
Passing yards	348	69
Passing: Comp–Att–Int	27–42–4	6–13–0
Time of possession	33:57	26:03

Team	Category	Player	Statistics
Oregon State	Passing	Gevani McCoy	27/42, 348 yards, TD, 4 INT
Oregon State	Rushing	Anthony Hankerson	28 carries, 154 yards, 3 TD
Oregon State	Receiving	Trent Walker	7 receptions, 96 yards, TD
Nevada	Passing	Brendon Lewis	5/12, 51 yards
Nevada	Rushing	Savion Red	23 carries, 137 yards, 4 TD
Nevada	Receiving	Brendon Lewis	1 reception, 18 yards

=== vs UNLV ===
UNLV Rebels (5–1) vs Oregon State Beavers (4–2) – Game summary

Quarter	1	2	3	4	Total
Rebels	3	13	7	10	33
Beavers	3	14	0	8	25

at Reser Stadium • Corvallis, OR

- Date: October 19, 2024
- Game time: 7:00 p.m.
- Game weather: Cloudy • Temperature: 62 °F (17 °C) • Wind: NW 4 miles per hour (6.4 km/h)
- Game attendance: 35,195
- Referee: Chris Wiggins
- TV announcers (The CW): Thom Brennaman (play-by-play) and Max Browne (analyst)

Game information

First quarter

- (7:57) OSU – Everett Hayes 20-yard field goal (Drive: 11 plays, 76 yards, 6:58; Oregon State 3–0)
- (0:34) UNLV – Caden Chittenden 20-yard field goal (Drive: 15 plays, 82 yards, 7:16; Tied 3–3)

Second quarter

- (8:55) OSU – Gevani McCoy 1-yard run, Everett Hayes kick (Drive: 12 plays, 75 yards, 6:39; Oregon State 10–3)
- (4:12) UNLV – Caden Chittenden 34-yard field goal (Drive: 12 plays, 59 yards, 4:43; Oregon State 10–6)
- (2:36) OSU – Gevani McCoy 71-yard run, Everett Hayes kick (Drive: 3 plays, 75 yards, 1:36; Oregon State 17–6)
- (1:25) UNLV – Hajj-Malik Williams 2-yard run, Caden Chittenden kick (Drive: 5 plays, 75 yards, 1:11; Oregon State 17–13)
- (0:00) UNLV – Caden Chittenden 34-yard field goal (Drive: 3 plays, 21 yards, 0:16; Oregon State 17–16)

Third quarter

- (4:21) UNLV – Hajj-Malik Williams 9-yard run, Caden Chittenden kick (Drive: 2 plays, 19 yards, 0:42; UNLV 23–17)

Fourth quarter

- (13:28) UNLV – Caden Chittenden 29-yard field goal (Drive: 14 plays, 61 yards, 4:51; UNLV 26–17)
- (4:53) UNLV – Ricky White III 22-yard pass from Hajj-Malik Williams, Caden Chittenden kick (Drive: 1 play, 22 yards, 0:06; UNLV 33–17)
- (2:14) OSU – Anthony Hankerson 3-yard run, Jermaine Terry II pass (Drive: 11 plays, 75 yards, 2:39; UNLV 33–25)

Statistics	UNLV	ORST
First downs	21	21
Total yards	384	368
Rushing yards	188	137
Passing yards	196	231
Passing: Comp–Att–Int	15–27–1	21–37–0
Time of possession	28:34	31:26

Team	Category	Player	Statistics
UNLV	Passing	Hajj-Malik Williams	15/27, 196 yards, TD, INT
UNLV	Rushing	Hajj-Malik Williams	13 carries, 65 yards, 2 TD
UNLV	Receiving	Ricky White III	9 receptions, 88 yards, TD
Oregon State	Passing	Gevani McCoy	21/37, 231 yards
Oregon State	Rushing	Gevani McCoy	16 carries, 81 yards, 2 TD
Oregon State	Receiving	Trent Walker	9 receptions, 88 yards

=== at California ===
Oregon State Beavers (4–3) at California Golden Bears (3–4) – Game summary

Quarter	1	2	3	4	Total
Beavers	0	0	0	7	7
Golden Bears	14	17	10	3	44

at California Memorial Stadium • Berkeley, CA

- Date: October 26, 2024
- Game time: 1:00 p.m.
- Game weather: Clear • Temperature: 70 °F (21 °C) • Wind: W 3 miles per hour (4.8 km/h)
- Game attendance: 33,090
- TV announcers (ESPN2): Mike Monaco (play-by-play), Kirk Morrison (analyst) and Dawn Davenport (sideline)

Game information

First quarter
Second quarter
Third quarter
Fourth quarter

Statistics	ORST	CAL
First downs	12	28
Total yards	200	478
Rushing yards	60	114
Passing yards	140	364
Passing: Comp–Att–Int	14–28–1	27–37–0
Time of possession	27:39	32:21

Team	Category	Player	Statistics
Oregon State	Passing	Ben Gulbranson	11/20, 131 yards, TD
Oregon State	Rushing	Anthony Hankerson	16 carries, 49 yards
Oregon State	Receiving	Trent Walker	5 receptions, 58 yards, TD
California	Passing	Fernando Mendoza	27/36, 364 yards, 2 TD
California	Rushing	Jaivian Thomas	7 carries, 33 yards, TD
California	Receiving	Trond Grizzell	5 receptions, 95 yards

=== vs San Jose State ===
San Jose State Spartans (5–3) vs Oregon State Beavers (4–4) – Game summary

Quarter	1	2	3	4	Total
Spartans	0	10	0	14	24
Beavers	0	10	3	0	13

at Reser Stadium • Corvallis, OR

- Date: November 9, 2024
- Game time: 12:30 p.m.
- Game weather: Clear • Temperature: 58 °F (14 °C) • Wind: S 3 miles per hour (4.8 km/h)
- TV announcers (The CW): J. B. Long (play-by-play) and Michael Bumpus (analyst)

Game information

First quarter
Second quarter
Third quarter
Fourth quarter

Statistics	SJSU	ORST
First downs	20	29
Total yards	463	474
Rushing yards	68	182
Passing yards	395	292
Passing: Comp–Att–Int	18-35-1	24-37-2
Time of possession	20:15	39:45

Team	Category	Player	Statistics
San Jose State	Passing	Walker Eget	18-35, 395 yards, TD, INT
San Jose State	Rushing	Floyd Chalk IV	11 carries, 45 yards, TD
San Jose State	Receiving	Nick Nash	6 receptions, 161 yards, TD
Oregon State	Passing	Ben Gulbranson	24-37, 292 yards, 2 INT
Oregon State	Rushing	Anthony Hankerson	30 carries, 121 yards, TD
Oregon State	Receiving	Trent Walker	11 receptions, 151 yards

=== at Air Force ===
Oregon State Beavers (4–5) at Air Force Falcons (2–7) – Game summary

Quarter	1	2	3	4	Total
Beavers	0	0	0	0	0
Falcons	7	7	0	14	28

at Falcon Stadium • Colorado Springs, CO

- Date: November 16, 2024
- Game time: 12:30 p.m.
- Game weather: Clear • Temperature: 48 °F (9 °C) • Wind: SE 9 miles per hour (14 km/h)
- TV announcers (CBS Sports Network): Jordan Kent (play-by-play), Logan Ryan (analyst) and Tina Cervasio (sideline)

Game information

First quarter
Second quarter
Third quarter
Fourth quarter

Statistics	ORST	AFA
First downs	9	23
Total yards	175	409
Rushing yards	69	270
Passing yards	106	139
Passing: Comp–Att–Int	9-21-1	6-6-0
Time of possession	18:04	41:56

Team	Category	Player	Statistics
Oregon State	Passing	Gabarri Johnson	9-19, 106 yards, INT
Oregon State	Rushing	Gabarri Johnson	13 carries, 22 yards
Oregon State	Receiving	Trent Walker	3 receptions, 36 yards
Air Force	Passing	Quentin Hayes	5-5, 110 yards
Air Force	Rushing	Dylan Carson	26 carries, 97 yards, TD
Air Force	Receiving	Cade Harris	2 receptions, 68 yards

=== vs Washington State ===
Washington State Cougars (8–2) vs Oregon State Beavers (4–6) – Game summary

Quarter	1	2	3	4	Total
Cougars	7	10	7	14	38
Beavers	7	14	10	10	41

at Reser Stadium • Corvallis, OR

- Date: November 23, 2024
- Game time: 4:00 p.m.
- Game weather: Cloudy • Temperature: 51 °F (11 °C) • Wind: S 7 miles per hour (11 km/h)
- Game attendance: 38,008
- TV announcers (The CW): Ted Robinson (play-by-play), Ryan Leaf (analyst) and Nigel Burton (sideline)

Game information

First quarter
Second quarter
Third quarter
Fourth quarter

Statistics	WSU	ORST
First downs	20	27
Total yards	384	484
Rushing yards	134	170
Passing yards	250	314
Passing: Comp–Att–Int	17–23–0	23–36–2
Time of possession	21:37	38:23

Team	Category	Player	Statistics
Washington State	Passing	John Mateer	17-23, 250 yards, 2 TD
Washington State	Rushing	John Mateer	14 carries, 75 yards, 2 TD
Washington State	Receiving	Kyle Williams	5 receptions, 95 yards, TD
Oregon State	Passing	Ben Gulbranson	22-34, 294 yards, 2 TD, 2 INT
Oregon State	Rushing	Anthony Hankerson	23 carries, 83 yards
Oregon State	Receiving	Trent Walker	12 receptions, 136 yards

=== at No. 11 Boise State ===
Oregon State Beavers (5–6) at Boise State Broncos (10–1) – Game summary

Quarter	1	2	3	4	Total
Beavers	0	7	3	8	18
No. 11 Broncos	14	7	6	7	34

at Albertsons Stadium • Boise, ID

- Date: November 29, 2024
- Game time: 9:00 a.m.
- Game weather: Clear • Temperature: 29 °F (−2 °C) • Wind: SE 5 miles per hour (8.0 km/h)
- Game attendance: 37,264
- TV announcers (Fox): Tim Brando (play-by-play), Devin Gardner (analyst), and Josh Sims (sideline reporter)

Game information

First quarter

- (7:49) BSU - Austin Bolt 11-yard pass from Maddux Madsen, Jonah Dalmas kick (Drive: 14 plays, 81 yards, 7:04; Boise State 7-0)
- (1:11) BSU - Ashton Jeanty 7-yard run, Jonah Dalmas kick (Drive: 11 plays, 53 yards, 4:36; Boise State 14-0)

Second quarter

- (1:48) ORST - Anthony Hankerson 83-yard run, Everett Hayes kick (Drive: 2 plays, 92 yards, 0:27; Boise State 14-7)
- (0:20) BSU - Latrell Caples 6-yard pass from Maddux Madsen, Jonah Dalmas kick (Drive: 8 plays, 75 yards, 1:28; Boise State 21-7)

Third quarter

- (7:34) BSU - Jonah Dalmas 43-yard field goal (Drive: 15 plays, 50 yards, 5:52; Boise State 24-7)
- (2:50) ORST - Everett Hayes 37-yard field goal (Drive: 10 plays, 55 yards, 4:44; Boise State 24-10)
- (1:28) BSU - Jonah Dalmas 29-yard field goal (Drive: 5 plays, 63 yards, 1:22; Boise State 27-10)

Fourth quarter

- (11:51) ORST - Darrius Clemons 12-yard pass from Ben Gulbranson, Gulbranson to Clemons pass (Drive: 10 plays, 75 yards, 4:37; Boise State 27-18)
- (0:58) BSU - Maddux Madsen 3-yard run, Jonah Dalmas kick (Drive: 6 plays, 32 yards, 1:52; Boise State 34-18)

Statistics	ORST	BSU
First downs	13	27
Total yards	342	465
Rushing yards	116	270
Passing yards	226	195
Passing: Comp–Att–Int	27–37–0	17–33–0
Time of possession	25:55	36:42

Team	Category	Player	Statistics
Oregon State	Passing	Ben Gulbranson	21/37, 226 yards, TD
Oregon State	Rushing	Anthony Hankerson	11 carries, 110 yards, TD
Oregon State	Receiving	Darrius Clemons	8 receptions, 123 yards, TD
Boise State	Passing	Maddux Madsen	17/33, 195 yards, 2 TD
Boise State	Rushing	Ashton Jeanty	37 carries, 226 yards, TD
Boise State	Receiving	Cam Camper	6 receptions, 73 yards
