= Gevani McCoy =

American gridiron football player

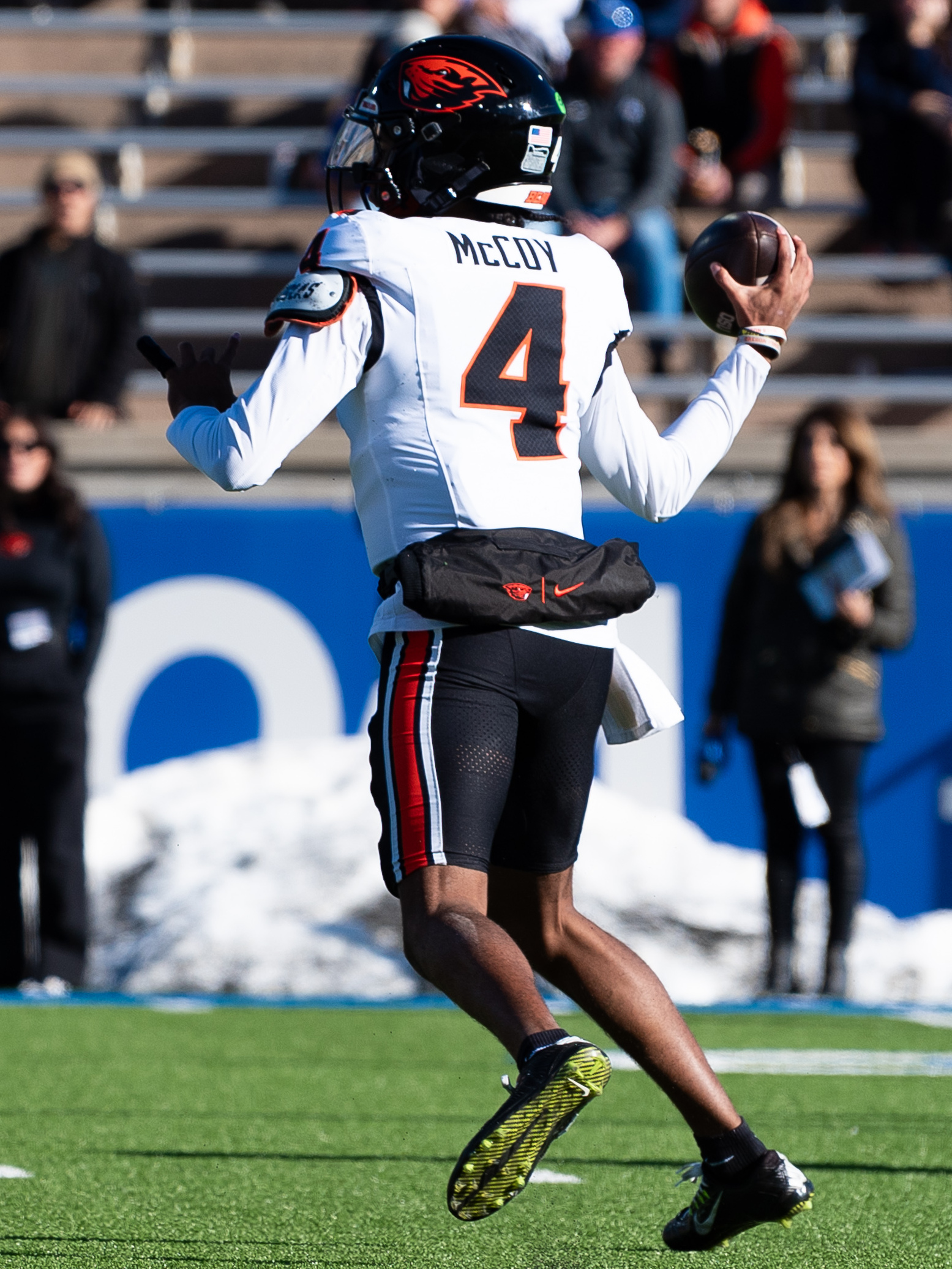
- McCoy with Oregon State in 2024

Profile
- Position: Quarterback

Personal information
- Born: September 2, 2002 (age 24); Baldwin Hills, California, U. S.
- Listed height: 6 ft 0 in (1.83 m)
- Listed weight: 195 lb (88 kg)

Career information
- High school: Lawndale (Lawndale, California)
- College: Idaho (2021–2023); Oregon State (2024); Temple (2025)
- NFL draft: 2026: undrafted

Career history
- BC Lions (2026)*
- * Offseason or practice squad member only

Awards and highlights
- Jerry Rice Award (2022); Big Sky Freshman of the Year (2022); First-team All-Big Sky (2023); Third-team All-Big Sky (2022)

Gevani McCoy (born September 2, 2002) is an American gridiron football quarterback. He played college football for the Idaho Vandals, winning the 2022 Jerry Rice Award, the Oregon State Beavers, and the Temple Owls.

== Early life ==
McCoy grew up in Baldwin Hills, California, and initially attended Lakewood High School. He passed for 830 yards and seven touchdowns as a sophomore. McCoy passed for 1,569 yards and 14 touchdowns and rushed 117 times for 721 yards and 12 touchdowns during his junior season. He transferred to Lawndale High School before the start of his senior year. McCoy committed to play college football at Idaho, which was his only scholarship offer, during his junior year of high school.

== College career ==
=== Idaho Vandals (2021–2023) ===
McCoy played in three games with the Idaho Vandals in 2021 before redshirting the season, throwing for 205 yards and a touchdown. He was named the Vandals' starting quarterback going into his redshirt freshman season in 2022. New head coach Jason Eck had initially considered moving McCoy to cornerback during offseason practices before deciding to keep him at quarterback. McCoy completed 204 of 298 passes for 2,719 yards with 27 touchdown passes and seven interceptions and also rushed for three touchdowns. He was named the Big Sky Conference Freshman of the Year, third-team All-Big Sky, and won the Jerry Rice Award as the most outstanding freshman in the Football Championship Subdivision.

=== Oregon State Beavers (2024) ===
On December 21, 2023, McCoy announced that he would be transferring to Oregon State.

On December 7, 2024, McCoy announced that he would enter the transfer portal for the second time.

=== Texas State Bobcats (2025) ===
On January 13, 2025, McCoy announced that he would transfer to Texas State. After spending the spring at Texas State, McCoy reentered the transfer portal in April 2025.

=== Temple Owls (2025) ===
On April 24, 2025, McCoy announced that he would transfer to Temple.

== Professional career ==
=== BC Lions ===
On February 13, 2026, McCoy left the Owls to sign with the BC Lions of the Canadian Football League (CFL). On April 27, McCoy was released by the Lions.

=== Statistics ===
| Year | Team | Games | | | Passing | | | | | | | | Rushing | | | |
| Year | Team | GP | GS | Record | Comp | Att | Pct | Yards | Avg | TD | Int | Rate | Att | Yards | Avg | TD |
|---|---|---|---|---|---|---|---|---|---|---|---|---|---|---|---|---|
| 2021 | Idaho | 3 | 0 | 0–0 | 15 | 32 | 46.9 | 205 | 6.4 | 1 | 4 | 86.0 | 20 | 24 | 1.2 | 0 |
| 2022 | Idaho | 11 | 11 | 6–5 | 203 | 297 | 68.3 | 2,735 | 9.2 | 27 | 7 | 171.0 | 75 | 98 | 1.3 | 3 |
| 2023 | Idaho | 12 | 12 | 8–4 | 230 | 354 | 65.0 | 2,919 | 8.2 | 15 | 8 | 143.7 | 88 | 188 | 2.1 | 2 |
| 2024 | Oregon State | 10 | 9 | 4–5 | 123 | 202 | 60.9 | 1,300 | 6.4 | 3 | 6 | 113.9 | 59 | 328 | 5.6 | 5 |
| 2025 | Temple | 8 | 0 | – | 24 | 33 | 72.7 | 256 | 7.8 | 2 | 0 | 157.9 | 16 | 31 | 1.9 | 0 |
| Career | | 44 | 32 | 18−14 | 594 | 918 | 64.7 | 7,392 | 8.1 | 48 | 25 | 144.2 | 258 | 669 | 2.6 | 10 |
