= 2025 Troy Trojans football team =

American college football season

2025 Troy Trojans football

Sun Belt West Division champion

Sun Belt Championship, L 14–31 at James Madison

Salute to Veterans Bowl, L 13–17 vs. Jacksonville State
- Conference: Sun Belt Conference
- West Division
- Record: 8–6 (6–2 Sun Belt)
- Head coach: Gerad Parker (2nd season)
- Offensive coordinator: Sean Reagan (2nd season)
- Offensive scheme: Power spread
- Defensive coordinator: Dontae Wright (2nd season)
- Co-defensive coordinator: Nathan Burton (2nd season)
- Base defense: Multiple 3–3–5
- Home stadium: Veterans Memorial Stadium

2025 Sun Belt Conference football standings
	Conf.			Overall
Team	W		L	W		L
East Division
No. 19 James Madison xy$^	8	–	0	12	–	2
Old Dominion	6	–	2	10	–	3
Coastal Carolina	5	–	3	6	–	7
Georgia Southern	4	–	4	7	–	6
Marshall	3	–	5	5	–	7
Appalachian State	2	–	6	5	–	8
Georgia State	0	–	8	1	–	11
West Division
Troy xy	6	–	2	8	–	6
Southern Miss	5	–	3	7	–	6
Louisiana	5	–	3	6	–	7
Arkansas State	5	–	3	7	–	6
Texas State	3	–	5	7	–	6
South Alabama	3	–	5	4	–	8
Louisiana–Monroe	1	–	7	3	–	9
Championship: James Madison 31, Troy 14
^ – College Football Playoff participant; $ – Conference champion; x – Division champion/co-champions; y – Championship game participant; Rankings from AP Poll

The 2025 Troy Trojans football team represented Troy University as a member of the West Division of the Sun Belt Conference during the 2025 NCAA Division I FBS football season. They were led by second-year head coach Gerad Parker and played their home games at Veterans Memorial Stadium in Troy, Alabama.

== Preseason ==
=== Media poll ===
In the Sun Belt preseason coaches' poll, the Trojans were picked to finish sixth place in the West division.

Offensive lineman Eli Russ, defensive lineman Luis Medina, defensive back Devin Lafayette and kicker Scott Taylor Renfroe Daniel King were awarded to be in the preseason All-Sun Belt second team offense, defense and special teams, respectively.

== Schedule ==
Date	Time	Opponent	Site	TV	Result	Attendance
August 30	6:00 p.m.	Nicholls*	Veterans Memorial Stadium; Troy, AL	ESPN+	W 38–20	25,546
September 6	2:30 p.m.	at No. 8 Clemson*	Memorial Stadium; Clemson, SC	ACCN	L 16–27	77,890
September 13	11:00 a.m.	Memphis*	Veterans Memorial Stadium; Troy, AL	ESPNU	L 7–28	23,384
September 20	2:30 p.m.	at Buffalo*	University at Buffalo Stadium; Amherst, NY	ESPN+	W 21–17	12,068
October 4	6:00 p.m.	South Alabama	Veterans Memorial Stadium; Troy, AL (rivalry)	ESPN+	W 31–24 ^{OT}	28,035
October 11	7:00 p.m.	at Texas State	Bobcat Stadium; San Marcos, TX	ESPN+	W 48–41 ^{OT}	24,369
October 18	2:00 p.m.	at Louisiana–Monroe	Malone Stadium; Monroe, LA	ESPN+	W 37–14	16,863
October 25	6:00 p.m.	Louisiana	Veterans Memorial Stadium; Troy, AL	ESPN+	W 35–23	16,341
November 1	7:00 p.m.	Arkansas State^{†}	Veterans Memorial Stadium; Troy, AL	ESPNU	L 10–23	23,391
November 13	6:30 p.m.	at Old Dominion	S.B. Ballard Stadium; Norfolk, VA	ESPN	L 0–33	18,831
November 22	3:00 p.m.	Georgia State	Veterans Memorial Stadium; Troy, AL	ESPN+	W 31–19	20,243
November 29	2:30 p.m.	at Southern Miss	M. M. Roberts Stadium; Hattiesburg, MS	ESPN+	W 28–18	25,987
December 5	6:00 p.m.	at No. 25 James Madison	Bridgeforth Stadium; Harrisonburg, VA (Sun Belt Championship Game)	ESPN	L 14–31	19,836
December 16	8:00 p.m.	vs. Jacksonville State	Cramton Bowl; Montgomery, AL (Salute to Veterans Bowl, rivalry)	ESPN	L 13–17	15,721
*Non-conference game; ^{†}Homecoming; Rankings from AP Poll and CFP Rankings released prior to game; All times are in Central time

== Personnel ==
=== Transfers ===
Outgoing
Player	Position	New school
Semaj James	CB	Unknown
Zak Bowden	IOL	Austin Peay
Kevin Beckham	WR	Hinds CC
Ty'Quarius Perry	DL	UT Martin
Kevin Norwood	DL	East Mississippi CC
Boaz Stanley	IOL	South Carolina
Darrell Starling	S	Unknown
Ian Conerly-Goodly	S	Southeastern Louisiana
Devonte Ross	WR	Penn State
Cecil Powell	S	Sam Houston
EJ Hall	CB	Tuskegee
Robert Cole	P	Unknown
Daniel King	IOL	North Carolina
LJ Green	CB	Tulane
Elliot Janish	P	Unknown
Phillip Lee	EDGE	Arkansas
Carlos Slayden	IOL	Southern Miss
Cheick Kaba	DL	Charlotte
Tyrek Thompson	S	Johnson C. Smith
Damien Taylor	RB	Ole Miss
Caleb McCreary	QB	Tennessee State
Jamontez Woods	RB	Unknown
Will Spain	LS	Unknown
Brody Dalton	TE	Alabama
Matthew Caldwell	QB	Texas
Dorion Jackson	CB	Tulane
Max Zuluaga	K	Trinity Valley CC
LaBarryon Moore	S	Valdosta State

Incoming
Player	Position	Previous school
Steven Sannieniola	S	Vanderbilt
David Daniel-Sisavanh	S	Georgia
Vysen Lang	IOL	Tennessee
Kaleno Levine	CB	Missouri State
Elijah Davis	DL	South Carolina
Jamontez Woods	RB	West Florida
Jaquez White	CB	Washburn
Taleeq Robbins	DL	Houston
Garner Langlo	OT	Appalachian State
Kristian Tate	WR	Delaware State
Tray Taylor	WR	Coastal Carolina
Patrick Screws	OT	Georgia Tech
Rara Thomas	WR	Georgia
Trey Cooley	RB	Georgia Tech
Malik Ellis	OT	Mississippi State
Ui Ale	QB	Houston
Amare Garrett	CB	Toledo

=== Roster ===
2025 Troy Trojans football team roster
Players
Coaches
Offense

Pos.	#	Name	Class
WR	0	Roman Mothershed	So
RB	1	Jordan Lovett	So
WR	2	Peyton Higgins	Sr
RB	3	Trey Cooley	Sr
RB	4	Jarris Williams	Sr
WR	5	Mojo Dortch	Jr
QB	6	Jack James	Fr
WR	7	Kristian Tate	So
WR	7	Rara Thomas	Sr
WR	8	Tray Taylor	Sr
QB	9	Goose Crowder	Jr
QB	10	Tucker Kilcrease	Jr
WR	12	Jywon Boyd	Fr
WR	13	Ky McNulty	Fr
TE	14	Ethan Conner	Sr
QB	15	Ui Ale	Jr
WR	17	Dariyonne Bryant	Jr
WR	18	DJ Epps	Jr
RB	20	Dakarai Shanks	Fr
RB	21	AC Walters	Fr
RB	22	Tae Meadows	Jr
WR	24	Ian Senn	Fr
RB	25	Dennis Palmer	So
RB	26	DeWhitt Betterson Jr.	Jr
TE	42	Chad Barham	Fr
TE	49	Tyce Khatri	So
OL	51	Malik Ellis	So
OL	52	Vysen Lang	So
OL	54	Caleb Ash	Fr
OL	55	Paul Bowling	Fr
OL	56	Jatorian Blackmon	Fr
OL	57	Noah Mercer	So
OL	58	Elijah Prather	So
OL	61	Sharvon Pierre	Fr
OL	62	Logan Potes	Fr
OL	63	Gavin Bowlin	Fr
OL	64	Ricky Timbers	Fr
OL	65	Tyler Cappi	Jr
OL	66	Eli Russ	Sr
OL	67	Matt Henry	Sr
OL	68	Obatare Jackson	So
OL	70	Casey Fua'au	Sr
OL	71	Kyler Gibson	Jr
OL	72	Patrick Screws Jr.	So
OL	73	Tyler Bell	So
OL	74	Tra'jon Townsend	So
OL	75	Zerian Hudson	Sr
OL	77	Garner Langlo	Sr
OL	78	Billy Gilmore	So
OL	80	JT Tang	So
WR	81	Jah'Marren Jackson	Fr
WR	82	Jackson Thomas	So
TE	84	Marquis Harris	Jr
TE	85	Fabian Rogosch	Jr
TE	86	Jackson Worley	So
TE	89	Trae Swartz	Sr

Defense

Pos.	#	Name	Class
BAN	0	Jah-Mal Williams	Sr
DT	1	Luis Medina	Sr
LB	2	Steven Cattledge	Sr
SPR	3	Devin Lafayette	Sr
LB	4	TJ Thompson	Jr
CB	5	Kaleno Levine	Sr
S	6	Justin Powe	Jr
LB	7	Jordan Stringer	Sr
CB	8	Jaquez White	Jr
CB	10	Jabari Strait	Jr
DE	11	Elijah Davis	Sr
CB	12	Trent Henry	Sr
S	13	Daivon Nelson	Jr
S	14	David Daniel-Sisavanh	Sr
DE	15	Taleeq Robbins	Sr
DE	16	Trashun Griffin	Fr
CB	17	Marlin Odom	Fr
SPR	18	Jordan Perry	Jr
DE	19	Deairich Jackson Jr.	Jr
LB	20	Keyshawn Campbell	So
CB	21	Amare Garrett	Fr
BAN	22	Donnie Smith	Jr
S	23	KC Bradford	Jr
S	24	Rondell Carter	So
S	27	OJ Vaughan Jr.	Fr
BAN	28	AZ Williams	Sr
S	29	Joe Lott	Fr
S	30	Keion Dunlap	Fr
CB	31	Shemar Welch	Fr
CB	33	LaMar Croskey	So
S	34	JT Alvis	Fr
BAN	35	Malaki Pegues	So
S	36	Jon Bocchino	Fr
CB	37	Jalen Peterson	Fr
S	38	Antonious Steele	Fr
CB	40	JaQueraius Thomas	Sr
BAN	41	Makel Green	Fr
LB	43	Kam Weaver	Fr
LB	44	Luke Hodge	Jr
BAN	45	Jordan Ferrell	So
LB	46	Gavyn Baker	Fr
DT	50	RJ Shamberger	Fr
DE	53	Jabril McNeill	Sr
DT	69	Jermaine Paramore	Fr
DT	90	Cam'Ron Underwood	Fr
DT	93	Kam Curry	Sr
DE	95	ShuMond Johnson	Fr
DT	96	Dylan Mann	So
DT	97	Kenny Reedy	Jr
DT	98	Jamel Fils-Aime	Sr
DT	99	Julian Peterson	Sr

Special teams

Pos.	#	Name	Class
K	19	Jaden Tynes	Fr
LS	24	Kinnick Manley	Jr
P	28	Evan Crenshaw	Jr
K	30	Nick Troemel	So
K	32	Paddy McAteer	Jr
K	40	Scott Taylor Renfroe	Sr
P	49	Austin Lewis	Fr
LS	87	Colton Walls	So

Head coach

- Gerad Parker (Kentucky)

Coordinators/assistant coaches

- Sean Reagan (Georgia College & State)
  Offensive coordinator/QB
- Dontae Wright (Miami (OH))
  Defensive coordinator/S
- Gary Banks (Troy)
  Wide receivers
- Chris Boone (Southern Miss)
  Outside linebackers
- Re'quan Boyette (Duke)
  Running backs
- Nathan Burton (Georgia Tech)
  Co-defensive coordinator/ILB
- Caleb Carbine (Troy)
  Offensive linemen
- Justin Manning (North Carolina Central)
  Defensive linemen
- Brandon Cooper (UT Martin)
  Cornerbacks
- Kevin Reihner (Stanford)
  Tight ends/tackles
- Darl Bauer (Hillsdale)
  Director of strength and performance
- A. J. Pierce (Troy)
  Defensive graduate assistant

Legend

- (C) Team captain
- (S) Suspended
- (I) Ineligible
- Injured
- Redshirt

Roster
Last update: 25 July 2025

== Game summaries ==
=== Nicholls (FCS) ===
Nicholls Colonels (FCS) (1–0) at Troy Trojans (0–0) – Game summary

Quarter	1	2	3	4	Total
Colonels (FCS)	0	10	7	3	20
Trojans	0	7	3	28	38

at Veterans Memorial Stadium • Troy, AL

- Date: August 30
- Game time: 6:00 PM CDT
- Game attendance: 25,546
- Referee: Ted Pitts
- TV announcers (ESPN+): Will Kollmeyer (play-by-play), Ben Stanfield (analyst), and Junior Louissaint (sideline)

Game information

First quarter

- No scoring plays.

Second quarter

- (10:42) NICH – Gabriel Showalter 45-yard field goal (Drive: 5 plays, 23 yards, 3:18; Nicholls 3–0)
- (2:14) NICH – Miequle Brock Jr. 3-yard run, Gabriel Showalter kick (Drive: 8 plays, 65 yards, 3:25; Nicholls 10–0)
- (1:01) TROY – Roman Mothershed 27-yard pass from Goose Crowder, Scott Taylor Renfroe kick (Drive: 9 plays, 70 yards, 1:08; Nicholls 10–7)

Third quarter

- (12:03) NICH – Miequle Brock Jr. 58-yard pass from Deuce Hogan, Gabriel Showalter kick (Drive: 5 plays, 75 yards, 2:57; Nicholls 17–7)
- (5:36) TROY – Scott Taylor Renfroe 24-yard field goal (Drive: 11 plays, 66 yards, 6:23; Nicholls 17–10)

Fourth quarter

- (14:09) TROY – Goose Crowder 16-yard run, Scott Taylor Renfroe kick (Drive: 10 plays, 58 yards, 4:33; Tied 17–17)
- (10:41) NICH – Gabriel Showalter 22-yard field goal (Drive: 7 plays, 70 yards, 3:28; Nicholls 20–17)
- (8:13) TROY – Tray Taylor 28-yard pass from Goose Crowder, Scott Taylor Renfroe kick (Drive: 7 plays, 66 yards, 2:23; Troy 24–20)
- (6:08) TROY – Tae Meadows 47-yard run, Scott Taylor Renfroe kick (Drive: 1 play, 47 yards, 0:09; Troy 31–20)
- (1:56) TROY – Ethan Conner 5-yard pass from Goose Crowder, Scott Taylor Renfroe kick (Drive: 5 plays, 44 yards, 2:13; Troy 38–20)

Statistics	NICH	TROY
First downs	16	23
Plays–yards	52–249	68–416
Rushes–yards	25–65	44–272
Passing yards	184	144
Passing: Comp–Att–Int	21–27–1	14–24–0
Turnovers	1	0
Time of possession	29:13	30:47

Team	Category	Player	Statistics
Nicholls	Passing	Deuce Hogan	21/27, 184 yards, TD, INT
Nicholls	Rushing	Tamaj Hoffman	9 carries, 52 yards
Nicholls	Receiving	Miequle Brock Jr.	6 receptions, 87 yards, TD
Troy	Passing	Goose Crowder	14/24, 144 yards, 3 TD
Troy	Rushing	Tae Meadows	23 carries, 186 yards, TD
Troy	Receiving	Roman Mothershed	2 receptions, 32 yards, TD

=== at No. 8 Clemson ===
Troy Trojans (1–0) at No. 8 Clemson Tigers (0–1) – Game summary

Quarter	1	2	3	4	Total
Trojans	7	9	0	0	16
No. 8 Tigers	0	3	17	7	27

at Memorial Stadium • Clemson, SC

- Date: September 6
- Game time: 2:30 PM CDT
- Game weather: Sunny
- Game attendance: 77,890
- Referee: Tim Hedgepeth
- TV announcers (ACCN): Chris Cotter (play-by-play), Chase Daniel (analyst), and Madison Fitzpatrick (sideline)

Game information

First quarter

- (12:06) TROY – Tray Taylor 44-yard pass from Goose Crowder, Scott Taylor Renfroe kick (Drive: 5 plays, 75 yards, 2:54; Troy 7–0)

Second quarter

- (12:38) TROY – Scott Taylor Renfroe 37-yard field goal (Drive: 7 plays, 13 yards, 2:24; Troy 10–0)
- (6:58) TROY – TJ Thompson 4-yard interception return, Scott Taylor Renfroe missed PAT (Drive: 1 play, 4 yards, 0:07; Troy 16–0)
- (4:11) CLEM – Nolan Hauser 25-yard field goal (Drive: 7 plays, 57 yards, 2:41; Troy 16–3)

Third quarter

- (11:05) CLEM – Adam Randall 1-yard run, Nolan Hauser kick (Drive: 8 plays, 75 yards, 3:55; Troy 16–10)
- (10:07) CLEM – Bryant Wesco Jr. 26-yard pass from Cade Klubnik, Nolan Hauser kick (Drive: 1 play, 26 yards, 0:06; Clemson 17–16)
- (5:54) CLEM – Nolan Hauser 30-yard field goal (Drive: 6 plays, 16 yards, 3:14; Clemson 20–16)

Fourth quarter

- (9:41) CLEM – Bryant Wesco Jr. 34-yard pass from Cade Klubnik, Nolan Hauser kick (Drive: 7 plays, 66 yards, 2:32; Clemson 27–16)

Statistics	TROY	CLEM
First downs	16	17
Plays–yards	63–301	55–316
Rushes–yards	32–78	31–120
Passing yards	223	196
Passing: comp–att–int	19–31–3	18–24–1
Turnovers	3	2
Time of possession	33:01	26:59

Team	Category	Player	Statistics
Troy	Passing	Goose Crowder	19/31, 223 yards, TD, 3 INT
Troy	Rushing	Tae Meadows	16 carries, 76 yards
Troy	Receiving	Tray Taylor	4 receptions, 69 yards, TD
Clemson	Passing	Cade Klubnik	18/24, 196 yards, 2 TD, INT
Clemson	Rushing	Adam Randall	21 carries, 112 yards, TD
Clemson	Receiving	Bryant Wesco Jr.	7 receptions, 118 yards, 2 TD

=== vs. Memphis ===
Memphis Tigers (2–0) at Troy Trojans (1–1) – Game summary

Quarter	1	2	3	4	Total
Tigers	7	14	0	7	28
Trojans	0	7	0	0	7

at Veterans Memorial Stadium • Troy, AL

- Date: September 13
- Game time: 11:00 AM CDT
- Game weather: Sunny • Temperature: 83 °F (28 °C) • Wind: NE at 7 miles per hour (11 km/h)
- Game attendance: 23,384
- Referee: Charles Lamertina
- TV announcers (ESPNU): Courtney Lyle (play-by-play) and Rene Ingoglia (analyst)

Game information

First quarter

- (10:34) MEM – Sutton Smith 5-yard run, Gianni Spetic kick (Drive: 8 plays, 65 yards, 4:26; Memphis 7–0)

Second quarter

- (12:02) TROY – Taleeq Robbins 15-yard fumble recovery, Scott Taylor Renfroe kick (Tied 7–7)
- (8:21) MEM – Brady Kluse 18-yard pass from Brendon Lewis, Gianni Spetic kick (Drive: 7 plays, 75 yards, 3:41; Memphis 14–7)
- (1:45) MEM – Sutton Smith 50-yard run, Gianni Spetic kick (Drive: 1 play, 50 yards, 0:10; Memphis 21–7)

Third quarter

- No scoring plays.

Fourth quarter

- (3:49) MEM – Makari Bodiford 8-yard run, Gianni Spetic kick (Drive: 8 plays, 58 yards, 5:03; Memphis 28–7)

Statistics	MEM	TROY
First downs	22	12
Plays–yards	72–430	55–112
Rushes–yards	45–217	23–40
Passing yards	213	72
Passing: comp–att–int	17–27–0	12–32–1
Turnovers	1	1
Time of possession	36:55	23:05

Team	Category	Player	Statistics
Memphis	Passing	Brendon Lewis	17/27, 213 yards, TD
Memphis	Rushing	Sutton Smith	18 carries, 113 yards, 2 TD
Memphis	Receiving	Cortez Braham Jr.	4 receptions, 69 yards
Troy	Passing	Tucker Kilcrease	10/29, 65 yards, INT
Troy	Rushing	Jordan Lovett	8 carries, 50 yards
Troy	Receiving	Roman Mothershed	8 receptions, 58 yards

=== at Buffalo ===
Troy Trojans (1–2) at Buffalo Bulls (2–1) – Game summary

Quarter	1	2	3	4	Total
Trojans	0	0	0	21	21
Bulls	7	0	7	3	17

at University at Buffalo Stadium • Amherst, NY

- Date: September 20
- Game time: 2:30 p.m. CDT
- Game weather: Sunny • Temperature: 73 °F (23 °C) • Wind: E at 12 miles per hour (19 km/h)
- Game attendance: 12,068
- Referee: Rick Wayne
- TV announcers (ESPN+): Michael Reghi (play-by-play) and Je'Rod Cherry (analyst)

Game information

First quarter

- (6:31) BUFF – James McNeil Jr. 1-yard run, Jack Howes kick (Drive: 7 plays, 71 yards, 3:25; Buffalo 7–0)

Second quarter

- No scoring plays

Third quarter

- (9:12) BUFF – Al-Jay Henderson 22-yard run, Jack Howes kick (Drive: 6 plays, 53 yards, 2:41; Buffalo 14–0)

Fourth quarter

- (14:56) BUFF – Jack Howes 39-yard field goal (Drive: 14 plays, 51 yards, 6:28; Buffalo 17–0)
- (10:23) TROY – Tucker Kilcrease 6-yard run, Scott Taylor Renfroe kick (Drive: 14 plays, 75 yards, 4:33; Buffalo 17–7)
- (5:45) TROY – RaRa Thomas 10-yard pass from Tucker Kilcrease, Scott Taylor Renfroe kick (Drive: 7 plays, 66 yards, 2:34; Buffalo 17–14)
- (0:45) TROY – Tae Meadows 20-yard run, Scott Taylor Renfroe kick (Drive: 9 plays, 50 yards, 1:48; Troy 21–17)

Statistics	TROY	BUFF
First downs	22	14
Plays–yards	83–365	62–278
Rushes–yards	47–163	34–125
Passing yards	202	153
Passing: Comp–Att–Int	19–36–1	14–28–0
Turnovers	2	0
Time of possession	32:52	27:08

Team	Category	Player	Statistics
Troy	Passing	Tucker Kilcrease	14/24, 148 yards, TD
Troy	Rushing	Tae Meadows	14 carries, 68 yards, TD
Troy	Receiving	RaRa Thomas	5 receptions, 78 yards, TD
Buffalo	Passing	Ta'Quan Roberson	9/15, 104 yards
Buffalo	Rushing	Al-Jay Henderson	22 carries, 76 yards, TD
Buffalo	Receiving	Jasaiah Gathings	2 receptions, 47 yards

=== vs. South Alabama (Battle for the Belt) ===
South Alabama Jaguars (1–4) at Troy Trojans (2–2) – Game summary

Quarter	1	2	3	4	OT	Total
Jaguars	7	0	10	7	0	24
Trojans	7	7	7	3	7	31

at Veterans Memorial Stadium • Troy, AL

- Date: October 4, 2025
- Game time: 6:00 p.m. CDT
- Game weather: Cloudy • Temperature: 77 °F (25 °C) • Wind: NE 7 mph
- Game attendance: 28,035
- Referee: Trennis Livingston
- TV announcers (ESPN+): Will Kollmeyer (play-by-play), Ben Stanfield (analyst) and Junior Louissaint (sideline)

Game information

First quarter

- (7:12) TROY – Tucker Kilcrease 34-yard run, Scott Taylor Renfroe kick (Drive: 10 plays, 82 yards, 4:48; Troy 7–0)
- (3:05) USA – Micah Woods 33-yard pass from Bishop Davenport, Hamilton DiBoyan kick (Drive: 9 plays, 75 yards, 4:07; Tied 7–7)

Second quarter

- (1:32) TROY – RaRa Thomas 25-yard pass from Tucker Kilcrease, Scott Taylor Renfroe kick (Drive: 4 plays, 65 yards, 1:07; Troy 14–7)

Third quarter

- (12:07) USA – Hamilton DiBoyan 40-yard field goal (Drive: 6 plays, 13 yards, 2:38; Troy 14–10)
- (7:02) USA – Bishop Davenport 56-yard run, Hamilton DiBoyan kick (Drive: 6 plays, 86 yards, 3:01; South Alabama 17–14)
- (3:50) TROY – DJ Epps 11-yard pass from Tucker Kilcrease, Scott Taylor Renfroe kick (Drive: 7 plays, 75 yards, 3:12; Troy 21–17)

Fourth quarter

- (6:47) TROY – Scott Taylor Renfroe 28-yard field goal (Drive: 12 plays, 67 yards, 7:03; Troy 24–17)
- (1:54) USA – Kentrel Bullock 15-yard pass from Bishop Davenport, Hamilton DiBoyan kick (Drive: 10 plays, 75 yards, 4:53; Tied 24–24)

Overtime

- (0:00) TROY – Tae Meadows 3-yard run, Scott Taylor Renfroe kick (Drive: 3 plays, 25 yards, 0:00; Troy 31–24)

Statistics	USA	TROY
First downs	18	20
Plays–yards	71–369	66–420
Rushes–yards	56–265	45–217
Passing yards	104	203
Passing: Comp–Att–Int	10–15–0	13–21–1
Turnovers	0	2
Time of possession	30:11	29:49

Team	Category	Player	Statistics
South Alabama	Passing	Bishop Davenport	10/15, 104 yards, 2 TD
South Alabama	Rushing	Kentrel Bullock	21 carries, 86 yards
South Alabama	Receiving	Devin Voisin	5 receptions, 44 yards
Troy	Passing	Tucker Kilcrease	13/21, 203 yards, 2 TD, INT
Troy	Rushing	Tucker Kilcrease	19 carries, 102 yards, TD
Troy	Receiving	Tray Taylor	2 receptions, 74 yards

=== at Texas State ===
Troy Trojans (3–2) at Texas State Bobcats (3–2) – Game summary

Quarter	1	2	3	4	OT	Total
Trojans	7	10	10	14	7	48
Bobcats	28	3	7	3	0	41

at Bobcat Stadium • San Marcos, TX

- Date: October 11, 2025
- Game time: 7:00 p.m. CDT
- Game weather: Sunny
- Game attendance: 24,369
- Referee: Marshall Lewis
- TV announcers (ESPN+): Brant Freeman (play-by-play) and Keith Moreland (analyst)

Game information

First quarter

- (11:56) TXST – Brad Jackson 8-yard run, Tyler Robles kick (Drive: 8 plays, 55 yards, 2:57; Texas State 7–0)
- (9:20) TXST – Greg Burrell 59-yard run, Tyler Robles kick (Drive: 4 plays, 80 yards, 0:55; Texas State 14–0)
- (2:29) TXST – Lincoln Pare 7-yard run, Tyler Robles kick (Drive: 13 plays, 70 yards, 6:00; Texas State 21–0)
- (1:12) TROY – Rara Thomas 57-yard pass from Tucker Kilcrease, Scott Taylor Renfroe kick (Drive: 3 plays, 75 yards, 1:17; Texas State 21–7)
- (0:08) TXST – Lincoln Pare 62-yard run, Tyler Robles kick (Drive: 3 plays, 71 yards, 0:58; Texas State 28–7)

Second quarter

- (7:34) TROY – Jackson Worley 6-yard pass from Tucker Kilcrease, Scott Taylor Renfroe kick (Drive: 15 plays, 75 yards, 7:34; Texas State 28–14)
- (2:35) TXST – Tyler Robles 42-yard field goal (Drive: 11 plays, 68 yards, 4:53; Texas State 31–14)
- (0:00) TROY – Paddy McAteer 53-yard field goal (Drive: 8 plays, 30 yards, 1:11; Texas State 31–17)

Third quarter

- (11:27) TROY – Jarris Williams 2-yard run, Scott Taylor Renfroe kick (Drive: 7 plays, 75 yards, 3:33; Texas State 31–24)
- (8:03) TROY – Scott Taylor Renfroe 47-yard field goal (Drive: 6 plays, 30 yards, 3:23; Texas State 31–27)
- (3:45) TXST – Lincoln Pare 1-yard run, Tyler Robles kick (Drive: 10 plays, 70 yards, 4:12; Texas State 38–27)

Fourth quarter

- (12:45) TROY – Trae Swartz 2-yard pass from Tucker Kilcrease, two-point conversion run attempt failed (Drive: 13 plays, 75 yards, 6:00; Texas State 38–33)
- (3:55) TXST – Tyler Robles 37-yard field goal (Drive: 16 plays, 66 yards, 8:45; Texas State 41–33)
- (1:13) TROY – DJ Epps 18-yard pass from Tucker Kilcrease, Tucker Kilcrease two-point conversion pass to DJ Epps (Drive: 9 plays, 75 yards, 2:42; Tied 41–41)

Overtime

- TROY – DJ Epps 6-yard pass from Tucker Kilcrease, Scott Taylor Renfroe kick (Drive: 5 plays, 25 yards; Troy 48–41)

Statistics	TROY	TXST
First downs	27	21
Plays–yards	73–458	75–574
Rushes–yards	32–43	53–326
Passing yards	415	248
Passing: Comp–Att–Int	30–41–0	19–22–0
Turnovers	0	0
Time of possession	28:59	31:01

Team	Category	Player	Statistics
Troy	Passing	Tucker Kilcrease	30/39, 415 yards, 5 TD
Troy	Rushing	Tray Taylor	2 carries, 18 yards
Troy	Receiving	DJ Epps	10 receptions, 148 yards, 2 TD
Texas State	Passing	Brad Jackson	19/22, 248 yards
Texas State	Rushing	Greg Burrell	13 carries, 136 yards, TD
Texas State	Receiving	Chris Dawn Jr.	7 receptions, 119 yards

=== at Louisiana–Monroe ===
Troy Trojans (4–2) at Louisiana–Monroe Warhawks (3–3) – Game summary

Quarter	1	2	3	4	Total
Trojans	10	7	10	10	37
Warhawks	0	8	6	0	14

at Malone Stadium • Monroe, LA

- Date: October 18, 2025
- Game time: 2:00 p.m. CDT
- Game weather: Sunny • Temperature: 89 °F (32 °C) • Wind: SE 12 mph
- Game attendance: 16,863
- Referee: Jeremy Parker
- TV announcers (ESPN+): Sean Fox (play-by-play) and Desmund Lighten (analyst)

Game information

First quarter

- (12:32) TROY – Tae Meadows 20-yard run, Scott Taylor Renfroe kick (Drive: 6 plays, 68 yards, 2:24; Troy 7–0)
- (6:01) TROY – Scott Taylor Renfroe 29-yard field goal (Drive: 11 plays, 56 yards, 5:20; Troy 10–0)

Second quarter

- (14:55) ULM – Nic Trujillo 7-yard pass from Hunter Herring, Andrew Well two-point conversion run (Drive: 11 plays, 75 yards, 6:06; Troy 10–8)
- (3:06) TROY – Tray Taylor 60-yard pass from Tucker Kilcrease, Scott Taylor Renfroe kick (Drive: 5 plays, 80 yards, 2:48; Troy 17–8)

Third quarter

- (9:40) ULM – Brandon Buckhaulter 12-yard pass from Aidan Armenta, Hunter Herring PAT failed (Drive: 12 plays, 75 yards, 5:20; Troy 17–14)
- (1:20) TROY – Scott Taylor Renfroe 41-yard field goal (Drive: 9 plays, 43 yards, 4:12; Troy 20–14)
- (0:32) TROY – Tray Taylor 11-yard run, Scott Taylor Renfroe kick (Drive: 1 play, 11 yards, 0:08; Troy 27–14)

Fourth quarter

- (14:12) TROY – Scott Taylor Renfroe 26-yard field goal (Drive: 4 plays, 7 yards, 0:59; Troy 30–14)
- (7:30) TROY – Joe Lott 53-yard interception return, Scott Taylor Renfroe kick (Drive: 7 plays, 35 yards, 2:56; Troy 37–14)

Statistics	TROY	ULM
First downs	13	20
Plays–yards	53–314	70–326
Rushes–yards	32–91	29–98
Passing yards	223	228
Passing: Comp–Att–Int	13–21–0	23–41–2
Turnovers	0	4
Time of possession	26:55	33:05

Team	Category	Player	Statistics
Troy	Passing	Tucker Kilcrease	13/21, 223 yards, TD
Troy	Rushing	Tae Meadows	14 carries, 66 yards, TD
Troy	Receiving	Tray Taylor	2 receptions, 89 yards, TD
Louisiana–Monroe	Passing	Aidan Armenta	19/33, 171 yards, TD, 2 INT
Louisiana–Monroe	Rushing	Zach Palmer-Smith	10 carries, 78 yards
Louisiana–Monroe	Receiving	Jonathan Bibbs	4 receptions, 60 yards

=== vs. Louisiana ===
Louisiana Ragin' Cajuns (2–5) at Troy Trojans (5–2) – Game summary

Quarter	1	2	3	4	Total
Ragin' Cajuns	7	10	3	3	23
Trojans	7	14	7	7	35

at Veterans Memorial Stadium • Troy, AL

- Date: October 25, 2025
- Game time: 6:00 p.m. CDT
- Game weather: Sunny • Temperature: 72 °F (22 °C) • Wind: E 6 mph
- Game attendance: 23,719
- Referee: Ted Pitts
- TV announcers (ESPN+): Will Kollmeyer (play-by-play) and Ben Stanfield (analyst)

Game information

First quarter

- (9:01) TROY – Tucker Kilcrease 8-yard run, Scott Taylor Renfroe kick (Drive: 11 plays, 67 yards, 5:53; Troy 7–0)
- (8:27) LA – Shelton Sampson Jr. 36-yard pass from Lunch Winfield, Tony Sterner kick (Drive: 2 plays, 75 yards, 0:36; Tied 7–7)

Second quarter

- (14:14) LA – Zylan Perry 1-yard run, Tony Sterner kick (Drive: 2 plays, 1 yard, 0:22; Louisiana 14–7)
- (9:42) TROY – Jaquez White 30-yard interception return, Scott Taylor Renfroe kick (Drive: 1 play, 0 yards, 0:12; Tied 14–14)
- (8:03) TROY – Tucker Kilcrease 4-yard run, Scott Taylor Renfroe kick (Drive: 2 plays, 26 yards, 0:42; Troy 21–14)
- (1:51) LA – Tony Sterner 37-yard field goal (Drive: 12 plays, 55 yards, 6:12; Troy 21–17)

Third quarter

- (7:16) TROY – Jordan Lovett 1-yard run, Scott Taylor Renfroe kick (Drive: 11 plays, 69 yards, 5:29; Troy 28–17)
- (1:29) LA – Tony Sterner 31-yard field goal (Drive: 10 plays, 62 yards, 5:47; Troy 28–20)

Fourth quarter

- (7:08) LA – Tony Sterner 32-yard field goal (Drive: 16 plays, 81 yards, 7:42; Troy 28–23)
- (2:55) TROY – Jordan Lovett 19-yard rush, Scott Taylor Renfroe kick (Drive: 7 plays, 75 yards, 4:13; Troy 35–23)

Statistics	LA	TROY
First downs	18	21
Plays–yards	65–371	63–345
Rushes–yards	42–184	39–165
Passing yards	187	180
Passing: Comp–Att–Int	12–23–3	16–24–1
Turnovers	3	1
Time of possession	29:28	30:32

Team	Category	Player	Statistics
Louisiana	Passing	Lunch Winfield	12/22, 187 yards, TD, 2 INT
Louisiana	Rushing	Lunch Winfield	23 carries, 139 yards
Louisiana	Receiving	Shelton Sampson Jr.	5 receptions, 74 yards, TD
Troy	Passing	Tucker Kilcrease	16/24, 180 yards, INT
Troy	Rushing	Jordan Lovett	21 carries, 113 yards, 2 TD
Troy	Receiving	Ethan Conner	3 receptions, 68 yards

=== vs. Arkansas State ===
Arkansas State Red Wolves (4–4) at Troy Trojans (6–2) – Game summary

Quarter	1	2	3	4	Total
Red Wolves	17	0	3	3	23
Trojans	0	3	0	7	10

at Veterans Memorial Stadium • Troy, AL

- Date: November 1, 2025
- Game time: 7:00 p.m. CDT
- Game weather: Clear • Temperature: 54 °F (12 °C) • Wind: N 1 mph
- Game attendance: 23,391
- Referee: Trennis Livingston
- TV announcers (ESPNU): Mike Corey (play-by-play) and Tyoka Jackson (analyst)

Game information

First quarter

- (9:23) ARST – Tyler Fortenberry 4-yard pass from Jaylen Raynor, Clune Van Andel kick (Drive: 7 plays, 80 yards, 3:13; Arkansas State 7–0)
- (8:18) ARST – Hunter Summers 19-yard pass from Jaylen Raynor, Clune Van Andel kick (Drive: 3 plays, 29 yards, 1:00; Arkansas State 14–0)
- (2:58) ARST – Clune Van Andel 30-yard field goal (Drive: 9 plays, 48 yards, 3:40; Arkansas State 17–0)

Second quarter

- (0:21) TROY – Scott Taylor Renfroe 43-yard field goal (Drive: 8 plays, 10 yards, 2:58; Arkansas State 17–3)

Third quarter

- (9:21) ARST – Clune Van Andel 31-yard field goal (Drive: 14 plays, 61 yards, 5:39; Arkansas State 20–3)

Fourth quarter

- (13:02) TROY – Tucker Kilcrease 1-yard run, Scott Taylor Renfroe kick (Drive: 7 plays, 45 yards, 3:24; Arkansas State 20–10)
- (3:38) ARST – Clune Van Andel 53-yard field goal (Drive: 4 plays, 7 yards, 2:13; Arkansas State 23–10)

Statistics	ARST	TROY
First downs	16	11
Plays–yards	62–297	68–187
Rushes–yards	33–50	34–21
Passing yards	247	166
Passing: Comp–Att–Int	21–29–0	19–34–1
Turnovers	2	2
Time of possession	28:25	31:35

Team	Category	Player	Statistics
Arkansas State	Passing	Jaylen Raynor	21/29, 247 yards, 2 TD
Arkansas State	Rushing	Kenyon Clay	16 carries, 40 yards
Arkansas State	Receiving	Hunter Summers	4 receptions, 70 yards, TD
Troy	Passing	Tucker Kilcrease	19/34, 166 yards, INT
Troy	Rushing	Tae Meadows	14 carries, 48 yards
Troy	Receiving	Tray Taylor	2 receptions, 56 yards

=== at Old Dominion ===
Troy Trojans (6–3) at Old Dominion Monarchs (6–3) – Game summary

Quarter	1	2	3	4	Total
Trojans	0	0	0	0	0
Monarchs	10	10	6	7	33

at S.B. Ballard Stadium • Norfolk, VA

- Date: November 13, 2025
- Game time: 6:30 p.m. CDT
- Game weather: Sunny • Temperature: 49 °F (9 °C) • Wind: SE 11 mph
- Game attendance: 18,831
- Referee: Steven Robinson
- TV announcers (ESPN): Matt Barrie (play-by-play), Tom Luginbill (analyst) and Harry Lyles Jr. (sideline)

Game information

First quarter

- (9:37) ODU – Ja'Cory Thomas 19-yard pass from Colton Joseph, Nathanial Eichner kick (Drive: 5 plays, 31 yards, 1:37; Old Dominion 7–0)
- (3:34) ODU – Nathanial Eichner 32-yard field goal (Drive: 8 plays, 44 yards, 3:06; Old Dominion 10–0)

Second quarter

- (10:16) ODU – Nathanial Eichner 28-yard field goal (Drive: 11 plays, 49 yards, 4:47; Old Dominion 13–0)
- (5:54) ODU – Colton Joseph 11-yard run, Nathanial Eichner kick (Drive: 3 plays, 62 yards, 0:42; Old Dominion 20–0)

Third quarter

- (8:57) ODU – Colton Joseph 25-yard run (Drive: 2 plays, 37 yards, 0:35; Old Dominion 26–0)

Fourth quarter

- (7:51) ODU – Trequan Jones 65-yard run, Nathanial Eichner kick (Drive: 5 plays, 89 yards, 2:30; Old Dominion 33–0)

Statistics	TROY	ODU
First downs	9	20
Plays–yards	57–138	68–503
Rushes–yards	34–26	47–351
Passing yards	112	152
Passing: Comp–Att–Int	13–23–1	11–21–0
Turnovers	2	0
Time of possession	29:45	30:15

Team	Category	Player	Statistics
Troy	Passing	Goose Crowder	11/21, 98 yards, INT
Troy	Rushing	Jah-Mal Williams	5 carries, 16 yards
Troy	Receiving	Roman Mothershed	3 receptions, 37 yards
Old Dominion	Passing	Colton Joseph	10/20, 147 yards, TD
Old Dominion	Rushing	Devin Roche	16 carries, 145 yards
Old Dominion	Receiving	Tre Brown III	5 receptions, 112 yards

=== vs. Georgia State ===
Georgia State Panthers (1–9) at Troy Trojans (6–4) – Game summary

Quarter	1	2	3	4	Total
Panthers	0	6	6	7	19
Trojans	0	10	7	14	31

at Veterans Memorial Stadium Stadium • Troy, AL

- Date: November 22, 2025
- Game time: 3:00 p.m. CDT
- Game weather: Cloudy • Temperature: 79 °F (26 °C) • Wind: W 9 mph
- Referee: Trennis Livingston
- TV announcers (ESPN+): Will Kollmeyer (play-by-play), Ben Stanfield (analyst) and Rosie Langello (sideline)

Game information

First quarter

- No scoring plays.

Second quarter

- (13:29) GAST – Liam Rickman 34-yard field goal (Drive: 8 plays, 33 yards, 2:47; Georgia State 3–0)
- (7:23) TROY – Scott Taylor Renfroe 28-yard field goal (Drive: 13 plays, 65 yards, 6:10; Tied 3–3)
- (1:15) TROY – Ethan Conner 26-yard pass from Goose Crowder, Scott Taylor Renfroe kick (Drive: 4 plays, 45 yards, 0:22; Troy 10–3)
- (0:00) GAST – Liam Rickman 47-yard field goal (Drive: 6 plays, 46 yards, 1:15; Troy 10–6)

Third quarter

- (9:26) TROY – Ethan Conner 39-yard pass from Goose Crowder, Scott Taylor Renfroe kick (Drive: 8 plays, 73 yards, 2:24; Troy 17–6)
- (3:29) GAST – Branson Robinson 4-yard run, two-point pass conversion attempt failed (Drive: 12 plays, 75 yards, 5:57; Troy 17–12)

Fourth quarter

- (12:01) TROY – DJ Epps 10-yard pass from Goose Crowder, Scott Taylor Renfroe kick (Drive: 9 plays, 49 yards, 3:08; Troy 24–12)
- (9:00) GAST – Javon Robinson 17-yard pass from Christian Veilleux, Liam Rickman kick (Drive: 7 plays, 81 yards, 2:46; Troy 24–19)
- (6:25) TROY – DJ Epps 35-yard pass from Goose Crowder, Scott Taylor Renfroe kick (Drive: 6 plays, 70 yards, 2:19; Troy 31–19)

Statistics	GAST	TROY
First downs	26	19
Plays–yards	85–516	75–423
Rushes–yards	34–156	32–62
Passing yards	360	361
Passing: Comp–Att–Int	25–51–1	27–43–0
Turnovers	1	1
Time of possession	29:55	30:05

Team	Category	Player	Statistics
Georgia State	Passing	Christian Veilleux	19/38, 303 yards, TD, INT
Georgia State	Rushing	Jordon Simmons	17 carries, 67 yards
Georgia State	Receiving	Javon Robinson	7 receptions, 142 yards, TD
Troy	Passing	Goose Crowder	27/43, 361 yards, 4 TD
Troy	Rushing	Tae Meadows	13 carries, 35 yards
Troy	Receiving	DJ Epps	8 receptions, 103 yards, 2 TD

=== at Southern Miss ===
Troy Trojans (7–4) at Southern Miss Golden Eagles (7–4) – Game summary

Quarter	1	2	3	4	Total
Trojans	0	14	0	14	28
Golden Eagles	0	3	7	8	18

at M. M. Roberts Stadium • Hattiesburg, MS

- Date: November 29, 2025
- Game time: 2:30 p.m. CDT
- Game weather: Sunny
- Game attendance: 25,987
- Referee: Tim Barker
- TV announcers (ESPN+): Jason Baker (play-by-play) and Austin Davis (analyst)

Game information

First quarter

- No scoring plays.

Second quarter

- (10:02) TROY – Tae Meadows 3-yard run, Scott Taylor Renfroe kick (Drive: 13 plays, 80 yards, 5:07; Troy 7–0)
- (5:42) USM – Creighton Wilbanks 27-yard field goal (Drive: 4 plays, 4 yards, 1:39; Troy 7–3)
- (0:18) TROY – Peyton Higgins 16-yard pass from Goose Crowder, Scott Taylor Renfroe kick (Drive: 13 plays, 75 yards, 5:24; Troy 14–3)

Third quarter

- (2:46) USM – Kadinn Morris 0-yard run, Creighton Wilbanks kick (Drive: 6 plays, 57 yards, 2:25; Troy 14–10)

Fourth quarter

- (6:58) TROY – RaRa Thomas 7-yard pass from Goose Crowder, Scott Taylor Renfroe kick (Drive: 11 plays, 85 yards, 5:07; Troy 21–10)
- (3:27) USM – Carl Chester 10-yard pass from Braylon Braxton, Micah Davis two-point conversion pass from Braylon Braxton (Drive: 9 plays, 75 yards, 3:31; Troy 21–18)
- (3:16) TROY – RaRa Thomas 75-yard pass from Goose Crowder, Scott Taylor Renfroe kick (Drive: 1 play, 75 yards, 0:11; Troy 28–18)

Statistics	TROY	USM
First downs	22	20
Plays–yards	73–428	66–304
Rushes–yards	38–132	31–95
Passing yards	296	209
Passing: Comp–Att–Int	25–35–1	20–35–1
Turnovers	1	1
Time of possession	32:30	27:30

Team	Category	Player	Statistics
Troy	Passing	Goose Crowder	24/34, 285 yards, 3 TD, INT
Troy	Rushing	Tae Meadows	21 carries, 94 yards, TD
Troy	Receiving	RaRa Thomas	5 receptions, 118 yards, 2 TD
Southern Miss	Passing	Braylon Braxton	20/35, 209 yards, TD, INT
Southern Miss	Rushing	Jeffery Pittman	10 carries, 51 yards
Southern Miss	Receiving	Carl Chester	4 receptions, 76 yards, TD

=== at James Madison (Sun Belt Championship) ===
2025 Sun Belt Conference Championship Game
Troy Trojans (8–4) at James Madison Dukes (11–1) – Game summary

Quarter	1	2	3	4	Total
Trojans	0	14	0	0	14
Dukes	3	14	0	14	31

at Bridgeforth Stadium • Harrisonburg, VA

- Date: December 5, 2025
- Game time: 6:00 p.m. CDT
- Game weather: • Cloudy Temperature: 26 °F (−3 °C) • Wind: 2 mph SW
- Game attendance: 19,836
- Referee: Tim Barker
- TV announcers (ESPN): Anish Shroff (play-by-play), Andre Ware (analyst) and Paul Carcaterra (sideline)

Game information

First quarter

- (1:55) JMU – Morgan Suarez 40-yard field goal (Drive: 6 plays, 11 yards, 2:28; James Madison 3–0)

Second quarter

- (14:01) TROY – Goose Crowder 1-yard run, Scott Taylor Renfroe kick (Drive: 6 plays, 75 yards, 2:24; Troy 7–3)
- (13:41) JMU – Wayne Knight 73-yard run, Morgan Suarez kick (Drive: 1 play, 73 yards, 0:14; James Madison 10–7)
- (6:56) JMU – Braeden Wisloski 26-yard pass from Alonza Barnett III, Morgan Suarez kick (Drive: 3 plays, 44 yards, 1:24; James Madison 17–7)
- (2:12) TROY – Tae Meadows 2-yard run, Scott Taylor Renfroe kick (Drive: 11 plays, 75 yards, 4:44; James Madison 17–14)

Third quarter

- No scoring plays.

Fourth quarter

- (4:11) JMU – Alonza Barnett III 26-yard run, Morgan Suarez kick (Drive: 5 plays, 83 yards, 2:25; James Madison 24–14)
- (3:17) JMU – Drew Spinogatti 22-yard fumble returned, Morgan Suarez kick (Drive: 4 plays, -65 yards, 0:46; James Madison 31–14)

Statistics	TROY	JMU
First downs	12	19
Plays–yards	67–177	67–411
Rushes–yards	28-(-26)	42–318
Passing yards	203	93
Passing: Comp–Att–Int	16-39-0	10-25-1
Turnovers	1	2
Time of possession	29:26	30:34

Team	Category	Player	Statistics
Troy	Passing	Goose Crowder	15/34, 196 yards
Troy	Rushing	Tae Meadows	7 carries, 10 yards, TD
Troy	Receiving	RaRa Thomas	3 receptions, 82 yards
James Madison	Passing	Alonza Barnett III	10/25, 93 yards, TD, INT
James Madison	Rushing	Wayne Knight	21 carries, 212 yards, TD
James Madison	Receiving	Braeden Wisloski	2 receptions, 31 yards, TD

=== vs. Jacksonville State (Salute to Veterans Bowl) ===
2025 IS4S Salute to Veterans Bowl
Troy Trojans (8–5) vs Jacksonville State Gamecocks (8-5) – Game summary

Quarter	1	2	3	4	Total
Trojans	7	6	0	0	13
Gamecocks	7	0	3	7	17

at Cramton Bowl • Birmingham, AL

- Date: December 16, 2025
- Game time: 8:00 p.m. CDT
- Game weather: Clear • Temperature: 38 °F (3 °C) • Wind: SE 1 mph
- Game attendance: 15,721
- Referee: Rich Edwards
- TV announcers (ESPN): Matt Barrie (play-by-play), Tom Luginbill (analyst) and Harry Lyles Jr. (sideline)

Game information

First Quarter

- (9:41) JVST – Brock Rechsteiner 22-yard pass from Caden Creel, Garrison Rippa kick (Drive: 9 plays, 71 yards, 3:41; Jacksonville State 7–0)
- (1:39) TROY – Luis Medina 0-yard fumble return, Scott Taylor Renfroe kick (Drive: 1 play, -12 yards, 0:07; Tied 7–7)

Second Quarter

- (10:57) TROY – Scott Taylor Renfroe 38-yard field goal (Drive: 9 plays, 25 yards, 4:00; Troy 10–7)
- (1:55) TROY – Scott Taylor Renfroe 30-yard field goal (Drive: 11 plays, 58 yards, 6:35; Troy 13–7)

Third Quarter

- (6:35) JVST – Garrison Rippa 51-yard field goal (Drive: 9 plays, 22 yards, 4:16; Troy 13–10)

Fourth Quarter

- (10:06) JVST – Andrew Paul 1-yard run, Garrison Rippa kick (Drive: 11 plays, 47 yards, 5:44; Jacksonville State 17–13)

Statistics	TROY	JVST
First downs	15	15
Plays–yards	62–217	65–273
Rushes–yards	32–88	43–100
Passing yards	129	173
Passing: Comp–Att–Int	15–30–2	14–22–0
Turnovers	2	1
Time of possession	29:30	30:30

Team	Category	Player	Statistics
Troy	Passing	Tucker Kilcrease	12/23, 116 yards, 2 INT
Troy	Rushing	Dennis Palmer	8 carries, 37 yards
Troy	Receiving	RaRa Thomas	5 receptions, 52 yards
Jacksonville State	Passing	Caden Creel	14/20, 173 yards, TD
Jacksonville State	Rushing	Khristian Lando	11 carries, 44 yards
Jacksonville State	Receiving	Deondre Johnson	6 receptions, 101 yards
