= 2025 Louisiana–Monroe Warhawks football team =

American college football season

2025 Louisiana–Monroe Warhawks football
- Conference: Sun Belt Conference
- West Division
- Record: 3–9 (1–7 Sun Belt)
- Head coach: Bryant Vincent (2nd season)
- Offensive scheme: Spread option
- Defensive coordinator: Earnest Hill (2nd season)
- Base defense: 4–2–5
- Home stadium: Malone Stadium

2025 Sun Belt Conference football standings
	Conf.			Overall
Team	W		L	W		L
East Division
No. 19 James Madison xy$^	8	–	0	12	–	2
Old Dominion	6	–	2	10	–	3
Coastal Carolina	5	–	3	6	–	7
Georgia Southern	4	–	4	7	–	6
Marshall	3	–	5	5	–	7
Appalachian State	2	–	6	5	–	8
Georgia State	0	–	8	1	–	11
West Division
Troy xy	6	–	2	8	–	6
Southern Miss	5	–	3	7	–	6
Louisiana	5	–	3	6	–	7
Arkansas State	5	–	3	7	–	6
Texas State	3	–	5	7	–	6
South Alabama	3	–	5	4	–	8
Louisiana–Monroe	1	–	7	3	–	9
Championship: James Madison 31, Troy 14
^ – College Football Playoff participant; $ – Conference champion; x – Division champion/co-champions; y – Championship game participant; Rankings from AP Poll

The 2025 Louisiana–Monroe Warhawks football team represented the University of Louisiana at Monroe in the Sun Belt Conference's West Division during the 2025 NCAA Division I FBS football season. The Warhawks were led by Bryant Vincent in his second year as the head coach. The Warhawks played their home games at Malone Stadium, located in Monroe, Louisiana.

== Preseason ==
=== Media poll ===
In the Sun Belt preseason coaches' poll, the Warhawks were picked to finish last place in the West division.

== Schedule ==
The football schedule was announced on February 28, 2025.

Date	Time	Opponent	Site	TV	Result	Attendance
August 28	6:00 p.m.	Saint Francis (PA)*	Malone Stadium; Monroe, LA	ESPN+	W 29–0	12,459
September 6	6:45 p.m.	at No. 21 Alabama*	Bryant–Denny Stadium; Tuscaloosa, AL	SECN	L 0–73	100,077
September 20	8:00 p.m.	at UTEP*	Sun Bowl; El Paso, TX	ESPN+	W 31–25	15,272
September 27	2:00 p.m.	Arkansas State^{†}	Malone Stadium; Monroe, LA	ESPN+	W 28–16	21,147
October 4	2:30 p.m.	at Northwestern*	Martin Stadium; Evanston, IL	BTN	L 7–42	12,023
October 11	6:00 p.m.	at Coastal Carolina	Brooks Stadium; Conway, SC	ESPN+	L 8–23	15,211
October 18	2:00 p.m.	Troy	Malone Stadium; Monroe, LA	ESPN+	L 14–37	16,863
October 25	2:30 p.m.	at Southern Miss	M. M. Roberts Stadium; Hattiesburg, MS	ESPN+	L 21–49	27,111
November 1	2:30 p.m.	Old Dominion	Malone Stadium; Monroe, LA	ESPN+	L 6–31	17,087
November 15	2:30 p.m.	South Alabama	Malone Stadium; Monroe, LA	ESPN+	L 14–26	19,872
November 22	4:00 p.m.	at Texas State	UFCU Stadium; San Marcos, TX	ESPN+	L 14–31	17,078
November 29	2:00 p.m.	at Louisiana	Cajun Field; Lafayette, LA (Battle on the Bayou)	ESPN+	L 27–30 ^{OT}	16,270
*Non-conference game; ^{†}Homecoming; Rankings from AP Poll and CFP Rankings released prior to game; All times are in Central time

== Personnel ==
=== Transfers ===
Outgoing
Player	Position	Destination
Carter Miller	IOL	UCF
Ahmad Hardy	RB	Missouri
Immanuel Hawkins	DL	Unknown
Miles Hill	S	Unknown
General Booty	QB	Unknown
Taven Curry	RB	Akron
Jaedyn McKinstry	WR	Unknown
Charles Thomas	CB	Arkansas–Monticello
Artis Cole	WR	Rice
La'Garrius Sims	LB	East Central CC
Tristan Wiley	WR	Harding
James Jones	RB	Sacramento State
Justin Kimber	WR	UT Rio Grande Valley
Devon Smith	OT	Western Kentucky
Jaylan Ware	DL	Jackson State
Travor Randle	CB	Prairie View A&M
Bennett Galloway	RB	Unknown
Xavion Butler	WR	Unknown
Quad Harrison	TE	Unknown
Amir McGruder	WR	Unknown
Isaiah Velez	QB	Unknown
Chris Williams	IOL	Unknown
Thomas Little Jr.	IOL	Unknown
Marc Britt II	WR	Unknown
Austin Cartwright	CB	Unknown
Hunter Smith	RB	Temple
Wydett Williams Jr.	S	Ole Miss
Antonio Martin	RB	Kansas State
Kevontay Wells	EDGE	Withdrawn
Wesley Campbell VI	TE	Georgia State

Incoming
Player	Position	Previous Team
Derek Omoregie	EDGE	Southern Connecticut
Kamrin Canterbury	CB	West Florida
Levontae Jacobs	DL	Norfolk State
Zach Palmer-Smith	RB	Richmond
Antavious Woody	IOL	UAB
Nic Trujillo	WR	New Mexico
Marcus Ross	LB	Mississippi State
Antonio Martin Jr.	RB	Southeastern Louisiana
Braylon McReynolds	RB	South Alabama
Clifton Mosley Jr.	DL	Henderson State
D'Arco Perkins-McAllister	CB	Chattanooga
Navarion Benson	CB	Louisiana Tech
Quentin Murphy	S	Arkansas
Brandon Buckhaulter	WR	Western Kentucky
Ziggy Loa	EDGE	New Mexico State
Jaydon Wright	RB	Minnesota
Jay Harper	CB	Wisconsin
Tyrell Reed	RB	Arkansas
Tavian Combs	S	New Mexico
Peyton Todd	P	LSU
Rico Powers Jr.	WR	Jackson State

== Game summaries ==
=== vs. Saint Francis (PA) (FCS) ===
Game One – Saint Francis Red Flash (FCS) (0–0) at Louisiana–Monroe Warhawks (0–0) – Game summary

Quarter	1	2	3	4	Total
Red Flash (FCS)	0	0	0	0	0
Warhawks	7	3	7	12	29

at Malone Stadium • Monroe, LA

- Date: Thursday August 28, 2025
- Game time: 6:00 p.m.
- Game weather: Rainy • Temperature: 72 °F (22 °C) • Wind: NE 13 mph
- Game attendance: 12,459
- Referee: Ted Pitts
- TV announcers (ESPN+): Sean Fox (play-by-play) and Desmund Lighten (analyst)

Game information

First quarter

- (9:25) ULM – Hunter Herring 1-yard run, Luke Stagg kick (Drive: 6 plays, 81 yards, 2:59; Louisiana–Monroe 7–0)

Second quarter

- (1:55) ULM – Luke Stagg 32-yard field goal (Drive: 11 plays, 60 yards, 5:03; Louisiana–Monroe 10–0)

Third quarter

- (9:37) ULM – Braylon McReynolds 13-yard pass from Aidan Armenta, Luke Stagg kick (Drive: 10 plays, 75 yards, 5:23; Louisiana–Monroe 17–0)

Fourth quarter

- (12:00) ULM – Aidan Armenta 7-yard run, Luke Stagg kick blocked (Drive: 15 plays, 91 yards, 6:40; Louisiana–Monroe 23–0)
- (4:39) ULM – Tyler Griffin 19-yard pass from Landon Graves, Luke Stagg kick blocked (Drive: 4 plays, 33 yards, 2:05; Louisiana–Monroe 29–0)

Statistics	SFPA	ULM
First downs	7	22
Plays–yards	47–131	69–434
Rushes–yards	27–81	43–311
Passing yards	50	123
Passing: Comp–Att–Int	12–20–1	14–26–1
Turnovers	1	1
Time of possession	29:11	30:49

Team	Category	Player	Statistics
Saint Francis (PA)	Passing	Nick Whitfield Jr.	9/16, 36 yards, INT
Saint Francis (PA)	Rushing	Raph Ekechi	10 carries, 37 yards
Saint Francis (PA)	Receiving	Zachary Betts	2 receptions, 16 yards
Louisiana–Monroe	Passing	Aidan Armenta	12/23, 95 yards, TD, INT
Louisiana–Monroe	Rushing	Braylon McReynolds	11 carries, 113 yards
Louisiana–Monroe	Receiving	Tyler Griffin	3 receptions, 32 yards, TD

=== at No. 21 Alabama ===
Game Two – Louisiana–Monroe Warhawks (1–0) at No. 21 Alabama Crimson Tide (0–1) – Game summary

Quarter	1	2	3	4	Total
Warhawks	0	0	0	0	0
No. 21 Crimson Tide	21	21	10	21	73

at Bryant–Denny Stadium • Tuscaloosa, Alabama

- Date: September 6
- Game time: 6:45 p.m.
- Game weather: Cloudy • Temperature: 77 °F (25 °C) • Wind: N 7 mph
- Game attendance: 100,077
- Referee: Tim Barker
- TV announcers (SECN): Tom Hart (play-by-play), Jordan Rodgers (analyst), and Cole Cubelic (sideline)

Game information

First quarter

- (12:02) ALA – Germie Bernard 29-yard pass from Ty Simpson, Conor Talty kick (Drive: 5 plays, 80 yards, 2:54; Alabama 7–0)
- (8:10) ALA – Germie Bernard 16-yard pass from Ty Simpson, Conor Talty kick (Drive: 5 plays, 39 yards, 2:25; Alabama 14–0)
- (3:18) ALA – Richard Young 3-yard run, Conor Talty kick (Drive: 5 plays, 23 yards, 2:56; Alabama 21–0)

Second quarter

- (13:04) ALA – Ty Simpson 8-yard run, Conor Talty kick (Drive: 6 plays, 65 yards, 2:49; Alabama 28–0)
- (9:20) ALA – Kaleb Edwards 6-yard pass from Austin Mack, Conor Talty kick (Drive: 5 plays, 39 yards, 2:18; Alabama 35–0)
- (0:31) ALA – Isaiah Horton 29-yard pass from Ty Simpson, Conor Talty kick (Drive: 10 plays, 58 yards, 5:17; Alabama 42–0)

Third quarter

- (6:20) ALA – Conor Talty 46-yard field goal (Drive: 12 plays, 48 yards, 5:46; Alabama 45–0)
- (0:17) ALA – Josh Cuevas 3-yard pass from Austin Mack, Peter Notaro kick (Drive: 10 plays, 56 yards, 4:29; Alabama 52–0)

Fourth quarter

- (12:46) ALA – Cole Adams 18-yard pass from Keelon Russell, Peter Notaro kick (Drive: 3 plays, 19 yards, 0:59; Alabama 59–0)
- (6:07) ALA – MJ Chirgwin 20-yard pass from Keelon Russell, Peter Notaro kick (Drive: 6 plays, 56 yards, 2:45; Alabama 66–0)
- (1:02) ALA – AK Dear 56-yard run, Peter Notaro kick (Drive: 3 plays, 60 yards, 1:32; Alabama 73–0)

Statistics	ULM	ALA
First downs	9	29
Plays–yards	50–148	69–583
Rushes–yards	32–93	36–212
Passing yards	55	371
Passing: comp–att–int	10–18–1	29–33–0
Turnovers	3	0
Time of possession	25:46	34:14

Team	Category	Player	Statistics
Louisiana–Monroe	Passing	Aidan Armenta	8/14, 28 yards, INT
Louisiana–Monroe	Rushing	Braylon McReynolds	7 carries, 24 yards
Louisiana–Monroe	Receiving	Tyler Griffin	2 receptions, 22 yards
Alabama	Passing	Ty Simpson	17/17, 226 yards, 3 TD
Alabama	Rushing	AK Dear	5 carries, 76 yards, TD
Alabama	Receiving	Germie Bernard	3 receptions, 67 yards, 2 TD

=== at UTEP ===
Game Three – Louisiana–Monroe Warhawks (1–1) at UTEP Miners (1–2) – Game summary

Quarter	1	2	3	4	Total
Warhawks	14	10	7	0	31
Miners	7	0	3	15	25

at Sun Bowl • El Paso, TX

- Date: Saturday September 20, 2025
- Game time: 8:00 p.m.
- Game weather: Sunny • Temperature: 82 °F (28 °C) • Wind: SE 5 mph
- Game attendance: 15,272
- Referee: Scott Hardin
- TV announcers (ESPN+): Andy Morgan (play-by-play) and Ed Stansbury (analyst)

Game information

First quarter

- (7:44) ULM – Jake Godfrey 12-yard pass from Aidan Armenta, Luke Stagg kick (Drive: 3 plays, 96 yards, 1:37; Louisiana–Monroe 7–0)
- (7:27) UTEP – Trevon Tate 73-yard pass from Malachi Nelson, Carlos Arreola kick (Drive: 1 play, 73 yards, 0:12; Tied 7–7)
- (2:31) ULM – Braylon McReynolds 40-yard run, Luke Stagg kick (Drive: 2 plays, 77 yards, 0:49; Louisiana–Monroe 14–7)

Second quarter

- (12:42) ULM – Jonathan Bibbs 35-yard pass from Aidan Armenta, Luke Stagg kick (Drive: 6 plays, 74 yards, 3:07; Louisiana–Monroe 21–7)
- (5:40) ULM – Luke Stagg 44-yard field goal (Drive: 10 plays, 49 yards, 5:15; Louisiana–Monroe 24–7)

Third quarter

- (7:53) ULM – Hunter Herring 1-yard run, Luke Stagg kick (Drive: 6 plays, 27 yards, 3:20; Louisiana–Monroe 31–7)
- (5:39) UTEP – Carlos Arreola 27-yard field goal (Drive: 9 plays, 78 yards, 2:09; Louisiana–Monroe 31–10)

Fourth quarter

- (13:31) UTEP – Wondame Davis Jr. 44-yard pass from Malachi Nelson, Hahsaun Wilson two-point conversion pass from Malachi Nelson (Drive: 3 plays, 67 yards, 1:21; Louisiana–Monroe 31–18)
- (6:00) UTEP – Wondame Davis Jr. 20-yard pass from Malachi Nelson, Carlos Arreola kick (Drive: 8 plays, 77 yards, 2:35; Louisiana–Monroe 31–25)

Statistics	ULM	UTEP
First downs	18	21
Plays–yards	57–399	78–442
Rushes–yards	42–250	28–33
Passing yards	149	409
Passing: Comp–Att–Int	9-15-0	23-50-2
Turnovers	0	2
Time of possession	31:51	28:09

Team	Category	Player	Statistics
Louisiana–Monroe	Passing	Aidan Armenta	8/14, 136 yards, 2 TD
Louisiana–Monroe	Rushing	Braylon McReynolds	18 carries, 107 yards, TD
Louisiana–Monroe	Receiving	Jake Godfrey	2 receptions, 49 yards, TD
UTEP	Passing	Malachi Nelson	22/46, 404 yards, 3 TD, 2 INT
UTEP	Rushing	Hahsaun Wilson	10 carries, 21 yards
UTEP	Receiving	Trevon Tate	7 receptions, 133 yards, TD

=== vs. Arkansas State ===
Game Four – Arkansas State Red Wolves (1–3) at Louisiana–Monroe Warhawks (2–1) – Game summary

Quarter	1	2	3	4	Total
Red Wolves	10	0	3	3	16
Warhawks	0	14	7	7	28

at Malone Stadium • Monroe, LA

- Date: Saturday September 27, 2025
- Game time: 2:00 p.m. CDT
- Game weather: Sunny • Temperature: 85 °F (29 °C) • Wind: N at 12 mph
- Game attendance: 21,147
- Referee: Trennis Livingston
- TV announcers (ESPN+): Sean Fox (play-by-play) and Desmund Lighten (analyst)

Game information

First quarter

- (13:34) ARST – Brandon Greil 32-yard interception return, Clune Van Andel kick (Drive: 3 plays, 75 yards, 1:26; Arkansas State 7–0)
- (2:35) ARST – Clune Van Andel 51-yard field goal (Drive: 8 plays, 30 yards, 2:16; Arkansas State 10–0)

Second quarter

- (6:28) ULM – Julian Nixon 8-yard pass from Aidan Armenta, Luke Stagg kick (Drive: 12 plays, 92 yards, 6:00; Arkansas State 10–7)
- (0:46) ULM – Jake Godfrey 37-yard pass from Aidan Armenta, Luke Stagg kick (Drive: 6 plays, 64 yards, 2:08; Louisiana–Monroe 14–10)

Third quarter

- (9:57) ULM – Braylon McReynolds 18-yard run, Luke Stagg kick (Drive: 4 plays, 45 yards, 2:21; Louisiana–Monroe 21–10)
- (5:44) ARST – Clune Van Andel 43-yard field goal (Drive: 12 plays, 25 yards, 4:05; Louisiana–Monroe 21–13)

Fourth quarter

- (12:09) ARST – Clune Van Andel 30-yard field goal (Drive: 14 plays, 53 yards, 6:08; Louisiana–Monroe 21–16)
- (5:36) ULM – Zach Palmer-Smith 2-yard run, Luke Stagg kick (Drive: 9 plays, 75 yards, 6:33; Louisiana–Monroe 28–16)

Statistics	ARST	ULM
First downs	22	18
Plays–yards	74–297	58–384
Rushes–yards	27–12	32–199
Passing yards	285	185
Passing: Comp–Att–Int	30–47–1	17–26–1
Turnovers	2	1
Time of possession	29:39	30:21

Team	Category	Player	Statistics
Arkansas State	Passing	Jaylen Raynor	30/47, 285 yards, INT
Arkansas State	Rushing	Devin Spencer	7 carries, 23 yards
Arkansas State	Receiving	Chauncey Cobb	8 receptions, 126 yards
Louisiana–Monroe	Passing	Aidan Armenta	17/26, 185 yards, 2 TD, INT
Louisiana–Monroe	Rushing	Zach Palmer-Smith	8 carries, 84 yards, TD
Louisiana–Monroe	Receiving	Jake Godfrey	2 receptions, 40 yards, TD

=== at Northwestern ===
Game Five – Louisiana–Monroe Warhawks (3–1) at Northwestern Wildcats (2–2) – Game summary

Quarter	1	2	3	4	Total
Warhawks	7	0	0	0	7
Wildcats	7	11	21	3	42

at Martin Stadium • Evanston, IL

- Date: Saturday October 4, 2025
- Game time: 2:30 p.m. CDT
- Game weather: Sunny • Temperature: 85 °F (29 °C) • Wind: S 10 mph
- Game attendance: 12,023
- Referee: Tim O'Dey
- TV announcers (BTN): Jack Kizer (play-by-play), Anthony Herron (analyst), and Dannie Rogers (sideline reporter)

Game information

First quarter

- (10:47) ULM – Nic Trujillo 34-yard pass from Aidan Armenta, Luke Stagg kick (Drive: 7 plays, 75 yards, 4:13; Louisiana–Monroe 7–0)
- (5:22) NU – Caleb Komolafe 3-yard run, Jack Olsen kick (Drive: 13 plays, 61 yards, 5:19; Tied 7–7)

Second quarter

- (13:57) NU – Hayden Eligon II 37-yard pass from Preston Stone, Lawson Albright two-point conversion run (Drive: 8 plays, 73 yards, 2:40; Northwestern 15–7)
- (2:00) NU – Jack Olsen 34-yard field goal (Drive: 14 plays, 62 yards, 7:47; Northwestern 18–7)

Third quarter

- (12:04) NU – Caleb Komolafe 39-yard run, Jack Olsen kick (Drive: 7 plays, 63 yards, 2:53; Northwestern 25–7)
- (5:12) NU – Griffin Wilde 49-yard pass from Preston Stone, Jack Olsen kick (Drive: 6 plays, 91 yards, 3:31; Northwestern 32–7)
- (0:16) NU – Drew Wagner 6-yard pass from Preston Stone, Jack Olsen kick (Drive: 9 plays, 53 yards, 4:04; Northwestern 39–7)

Fourth quarter

- (8:43) NU – Jack Olsen 33-yard field goal (Drive: 7 plays, 30 yards, 4:07; Northwestern 42–7)

Statistics	ULM	NU
First downs	18	26
Plays–yards	53–273	71–515
Rushes–yards	30–87	38–246
Passing yards	186	269
Passing: comp–att–int	12-23-0	21–33–0
Turnovers	0	0
Time of possession	24:18	35:42

Team	Category	Player	Statistics
Louisiana–Monroe	Passing	Aidan Armenta	10/19, 129 yards, TD
Louisiana–Monroe	Rushing	Braylon McReynolds	8 carries, 49 yards
Louisiana–Monroe	Receiving	Nic Trujillo	2 receptions, 61 yards, TD
Northwestern	Passing	Preston Stone	20/31, 262 yards, 3 TD
Northwestern	Rushing	Dashun Reeder	11 carries, 79 yards
Northwestern	Receiving	Hayden Eligon II	3 receptions, 80 yards, TD

=== at Coastal Carolina ===
Game Six – Louisiana–Monroe Warhawks (3–2) at Coastal Carolina Chanticleers (2–3) – Game summary

Quarter	1	2	3	4	Total
Warhawks	0	0	8	0	8
Chanticleers	6	10	7	0	23

at Brooks Stadium • Conway, SC

- Date: October 11, 2025
- Game time: 7:00 p.m. EDT
- Game weather: Sunny • Temperature: 67 °F (19 °C) • Wind: S 16 mph
- Game attendance: 15,211
- TV announcers (ESPN+): Sam Weiderhaft (play-by-play), Ricky Sapp (analyst) and Haley Nitsche (sideline)

Game information

First quarter

- (8:52) CCU – Kian Afrookhteh 38-yard field goal (Drive: 15 plays, 60 yards, 6:07; Coastal Carolina 3–0)
- (4:12) CCU – Kian Afrookhteh 26-yard field goal (Drive: 6 plays, 50 yards, 2:17; Coastal Carolina 6–0)

Second quarter

- (6:59) CCU – Kian Afrookhteh 39-yard field goal (Drive: 8 plays, 36 yards, 2:49; Coastal Carolina 9–0)
- (0:12) CCU – Brooks Johnson 8-yard pass from Samari Collier, Kian Afrookhteh kick (Drive: 7 plays, 73 yards, 1:12; Coastal Carolina 16–0)

Third quarter

- (9:38) ULM – Jonathan Bibbs 27-yard pass from Aidan Armenta, Hunter Herring pass to Dorian Lewis for two-point conversion (Drive: 4 plays, 74 yards, 1:23; Coastal Carolina 16–8)
- (7:14) CCU – Samari Collier 39-yard run, Kian Afrookhteh kick (Drive: 7 plays, 69 yards, 2:16; Coastal Carolina 23–8)

Fourth quarter

- No scoring plays.

Statistics	ULM	CCU
First downs	14	16
Plays–yards	62–315	70–378
Rushes–yards	33–139	51–286
Passing yards	176	92
Passing: Comp–Att–Int	14-29-2	8-19-0
Turnovers	2	1
Time of possession	30:04	29:56

Team	Category	Player	Statistics
Louisiana–Monroe	Passing	Aidan Arments	14/28, 176 yards, TD, INT
Louisiana–Monroe	Rushing	Braylon McReynolds	14 carries, 78 yards
Louisiana–Monroe	Receiving	Jonathan Bibbs	5 receptions, 79 yards, TD
Coastal Carolina	Passing	Samari Collier	5/15, 37 yards, TD
Coastal Carolina	Rushing	Samari Collier	12 carries, 86 yards, TD
Coastal Carolina	Receiving	Jameson Tucker	1 reception, 37 yards

=== vs. Troy ===
Game Seven – Troy Trojans (4–2) at Louisiana–Monroe Warhawks (3–3) – Game summary

Quarter	1	2	3	4	Total
Trojans	10	7	10	10	37
Warhawks	0	8	6	0	14

at Malone Stadium • Monroe, LA

- Date: Saturday October 18, 2025
- Game time: 2:00 p.m. CDT
- Game weather: Sunny • Temperature: 89 °F (32 °C) • Wind: SE 12 mph
- Game attendance: 16,863
- Referee: Jeremy Parker
- TV announcers (ESPN+): Sean Fox (play-by-play) and Desmund Lighten (analyst)

Game information

First quarter

- (12:32) TROY – Tae Meadows 20-yard run, Scott Taylor Renfroe kick (Drive: 6 plays, 68 yards, 2:24; Troy 7–0)
- (6:01) TROY – Scott Taylor Renfroe 29-yard field goal (Drive: 11 plays, 56 yards, 5:20; Troy 10–0)

Second quarter

- (14:55) ULM – Nic Trujillo 7-yard pass from Hunter Herring, Andrew Well two-point conversion run (Drive: 11 plays, 75 yards, 6:06; Troy 10–8)
- (3:06) TROY – Tray Taylor 60-yard pass from Tucker Kilcrease, Scott Taylor Renfroe kick (Drive: 5 plays, 80 yards, 2:48; Troy 17–8)

Third quarter

- (9:40) ULM – Brandon Buckhaulter 12-yard pass from Aidan Armenta, Hunter Herring PAT failed (Drive: 12 plays, 75 yards, 5:20; Troy 17–14)
- (1:20) TROY – Scott Taylor Renfroe 41-yard field goal (Drive: 9 plays, 43 yards, 4:12; Troy 20–14)
- (0:32) TROY – Tray Taylor 11-yard run, Scott Taylor Renfroe kick (Drive: 1 play, 11 yards, 0:08; Troy 27–14)

Fourth quarter

- (14:12) TROY – Scott Taylor Renfroe 26-yard field goal (Drive: 4 plays, 7 yards, 0:59; Troy 30–14)
- (7:30) TROY – Joe Lott 53-yard interception return, Scott Taylor Renfroe kick (Drive: 7 plays, 35 yards, 2:56; Troy 37–14)

Statistics	TROY	ULM
First downs	13	20
Plays–yards	53–314	70–326
Rushes–yards	32–91	29–98
Passing yards	223	228
Passing: Comp–Att–Int	13–21–0	23–41–2
Turnovers	0	4
Time of possession	26:55	33:05

Team	Category	Player	Statistics
Troy	Passing	Tucker Kilcrease	13/21, 223 yards, TD
Troy	Rushing	Tae Meadows	14 carries, 66 yards, TD
Troy	Receiving	Tray Taylor	2 receptions, 89 yards, TD
Louisiana–Monroe	Passing	Aidan Armenta	19/33, 171 yards, TD, 2 INT
Louisiana–Monroe	Rushing	Zach Palmer-Smith	10 carries, 78 yards
Louisiana–Monroe	Receiving	Jonathan Bibbs	4 receptions, 60 yards

=== at Southern Miss ===
Game Eight – Louisiana–Monroe Warhawks (3–4) at Southern Miss Golden Eagles (5–2) – Game summary

Quarter	1	2	3	4	Total
Warhawks	7	7	0	7	21
Golden Eagles	7	14	14	14	49

at M. M. Roberts Stadium • Hattiesburg, MS

- Date: Saturday October 25, 2025
- Game time: 2:30 p.m. CST
- Game weather: Rain • Temperature: 76 °F (24 °C) • Wind: 6 mph
- Game attendance: 27,111
- Referee: Marshall Lewis
- TV announcers (ESPN+): Jason Baker (play-by-play) and Austin Davis (analyst)

Game information

First quarter

- (7:35) ULM – Tyler Griffin 4-yard pass from Landon Graves, Jacob Chambliss kick (Drive: 12 plays, 75 yards, 7:25; Louisiana–Monore 7–0)
- (5:13) USM – Matt Jones 4-yard run, Creighton Wilbanks kick (Drive: 8 plays, 69 yards, 2:18; Tied 7–7)

Second quarter

- (12:05) USM – Kyirin Heath 34-yard pass from Braylon Braxton, Creighton Wilbanks kick (Drive: 11 plays, 80 yards, 4:38; Southern Miss 14–7)
- (8:00) USM – Tychaun Chapman 39-yard pass from Braylon Braxton, Creighton Wilbanks kick (Drive: 4 plays, 75 yards, 1:44; Southern Miss 21–7)
- (2:47) ULM – Zach Palmer-Smith 21-yard run, Jacob Chambliss kick (Drive: 7 plays, 64 yards, 2:34; Southern Miss 21–14)

Third quarter

- (10:28) USM – Matt Jones 3-yard run, Creighton Wilbanks kick (Drive: 2 plays, 7 yards, 0:28; Southern Miss 28–14)
- (6:03) USM – Carl Chester 8-yard pass from Braylon Braxton, Creighton Wilbanks kick (Drive: 4 plays, 63 yards, 1:26; Southern Miss 35–14)

Fourth quarter

- (12:54) USM – Bralon Brown 24-yard pass from Braylon Braxton, Creighton Wilbanks kick (Drive: 6 plays, 68 yards, 1:41; Southern Miss 42–14)
- (6:23) ULM – Julian Nixon 2-yard run, Jacob Chambliss kick (Drive: 12 plays, 75 yards, 6:31; Southern Miss 42–21)
- (4:56) USM – Jaylin Carter 27-yard run, Creighton Wilbanks kick (Drive: 3 plays, 44 yards, 1:25; Southern Miss 49–21)

Statistics	ULM	USM
First downs	22	21
Plays–yards	66–312	61–445
Rushes–yards	40–209	38–197
Passing yards	103	248
Passing: Comp–Att–Int	12–26–2	18–23–0
Turnovers	3	0
Time of possession	34:57	25:03

Team	Category	Player	Statistics
Louisiana–Monroe	Passing	Landon Graves	12/26, 103 yards, TD, 2 INT
Louisiana–Monroe	Rushing	Zach Palmer-Smith	11 carries, 111 yards, TD
Louisiana–Monroe	Receiving	Jonathan Bibbs	1 reception, 34 yards
Southern Miss	Passing	Braylon Braxton	18/23, 248 yards, 4 TD
Southern Miss	Rushing	Robert Briggs	7 carries, 55 yards
Southern Miss	Receiving	Tychaun Chapman	3 receptions, 83 yards, TD

=== vs. Old Dominion ===
Game Nine – Old Dominion Monarchs (5–3) at Louisiana–Monroe Warhawks (3–5) – Game summary

Quarter	1	2	3	4	Total
Monarchs	17	7	0	7	31
Warhawks	0	0	0	6	6

at Malone Stadium • Monroe, LA

- Date: Saturday November 1, 2025
- Game time: 2:30 p.m. CDT
- Game weather: Cloudy • Temperature: 61 °F (16 °C) • Wind: N 3 mph
- Game attendance: 17,087
- Referee: Tim Barker
- TV announcers (ESPN+): Sean Fox (play-by-play) and Desmund Lighten (analyst)

Game information

First quarter

- (9:53) ODU – Ke'Travion Hargrove 12-yard run, Nathanial Eichner kick (Drive: 3 plays, 29 yards, 0:40; Old Dominion 7–0)
- (4:00) ODU – Colton Joseph 7-yard run, Nathanial Eichner kick (Drive: 4 plays, 65 yards, 1:35; Old Dominion 14–0)
- (1:35) ODU – Nathanial Eichner 30-yard field goal (Drive: 6 plays, 21 yards, 2:16; Old Dominion 17–0)

Second quarter

- (9:09) ODU – Colton Joseph 14-yard run, Nathanial Eichner kick (Drive: 6 plays, 69 yards, 2:28; Old Dominion 24–0)

Third quarter

- No scoring plays.

Fourth quarter

- (12:29) ODU – Colton Joseph 1-yard run, Nathanial Eichner kick (Drive: 4 plays, 38 yards, 1:20; Old Dominion 31–0)
- (4:15) ULM – Rylan Green 4-yard pass from Aidan Armenta, two-point pass conversion attempt failed (Drive: 2 plays, 2 yards, 0:42; Old Dominion 31–6)

Statistics	ODU	ULM
First downs	20	11
Plays–yards	67–391	68–293
Rushes–yards	44–160	47–132
Passing yards	231	161
Passing: Comp–Att–Int	12–23–0	13–21–1
Turnovers	1	2
Time of possession	26:17	33:43

Team	Category	Player	Statistics
Old Dominion	Passing	Colton Joseph	12/22, 231 yards
Old Dominion	Rushing	Colton Joseph	16 carries, 72 yards, 3 TD
Old Dominion	Receiving	Tre Brown III	5 receptions, 83 yards
Louisiana–Monroe	Passing	Aidan Armenta	12/20, 152 yards, TD, INT
Louisiana–Monroe	Rushing	Zach Palmer-Smith	18 carries, 96 yards
Louisiana–Monroe	Receiving	JP Coulter	3 receptions, 54 yards

=== vs. South Alabama ===
Game Ten – South Alabama Jaguars (2–7) at Louisiana–Monroe Warhawks (3–6) – Game summary

Quarter	1	2	3	4	Total
Jaguars	0	7	13	6	26
Warhawks	14	0	0	0	14

at Malone Stadium • Monroe, LA

- Date: Saturday November 15, 2025
- Game time: 2:30 p.m. CST
- Game weather: Sunny • Temperature: 82 °F (28 °C) • Wind: SW 16 mph
- Game attendance: 19,872
- Referee: Brandon Kirkland
- TV announcers (ESPN+): Sean Fox (play-by-play) and Desmund Lighten (analyst)

Game information

First quarter

- (13:08) ULM – Braylon McReynolds 29-yard run, Jacob Chambliss kick (Drive: 1 play, 29 yards, 0:08; Louisiana–Monroe 7–0)
- (5:42) ULM – Noah Flemmings 42-yard fumble recovery, Jacob Chambliss kick (Louisiana–Monroe 14–0)

Second quarter

- (11:03) USA – Kentrel Bullock 1-yard run, Davis Little kick (Drive: 9 plays, 64 yards, 4:14; Louisiana–Monroe 14–7)

Third quarter

- (10:03) USA – Bishop Davenport 1-yard run, Davis Little kick (Drive: 6 plays, 69 yards, 2:57; Tied 14–14)
- (5:05) USA – Bishop Davenport 3-yard run (Drive: 9 plays, 66 yards, 3:37; South Alabama 20–14)

Fourth quarter

- (14:36) USA – Kentrel Bullock 8-yard run (Drive: 7 plays, 45 yards, 2:59; South Alabama 26–14)

Statistics	USA	ULM
First downs	24	9
Plays–yards	76–362	43–154
Rushes–yards	53–200	24–72
Passing yards	162	82
Passing: Comp–Att–Int	17–23–0	10–19–1
Turnovers	1	1
Time of possession	37:25	22:35

Team	Category	Player	Statistics
South Alabama	Passing	Bishop Davenport	17/23, 162 yards
South Alabama	Rushing	Kentrel Bullock	20 carries, 85 yards, 2 TD
South Alabama	Receiving	Anthony Eager	5 receptions, 83 yards
Louisiana–Monroe	Passing	Aiden Armenta	10/19, 82 yards, INT
Louisiana–Monroe	Rushing	Braylon McReynolds	12 carries, 52 yards, TD
Louisiana–Monroe	Receiving	Julian Nixon	2 receptions, 31 yards

=== at Texas State ===
Game Eleven – Louisiana–Monroe Warhawks (3–7) at Texas State Bobcats (4–6) – Game summary

Quarter	1	2	3	4	Total
Warhawks	0	0	7	7	14
Bobcats	0	3	14	14	31

at UFCU Stadium • San Marcos, TX

- Date: Saturday November 22, 2025
- Game time: 4:00 p.m. CDT
- Game weather: Sunny
- Game attendance: 17,078
- Referee: Steven Robinson
- TV announcers (ESPN+): Brant Freeman (play-by-play) and Keith Moreland (analyst)

Game information

First quarter

- No scoring plays.

Second quarter

- (12:08) TXST – Tyler Robles 30-yard field goal (Drive: 14 plays, 71 yards, 4:55; Texas State 3–0)

Third quarter

- (11:10) TXST – Brad Jackson 19-yard run, Tyler Robles kick (Drive: 5 plays, 34 yards, 1:48; Texas State 10–0)
- (7:15) ULM – Zach Palmer-Smith 14-yard run, Jacob Chambliss kick (Drive: 10 plays, 75 yards, 3:55; Texas State 10–7)
- (3:12) TXST – Lincoln Pare 6-yard pass from Brad Jackson, Tyler Robles kick (Drive: 11 plays, 72 yards, 4:03; Texas State 17–7)

Fourth quarter

- (11:30) TXST – Beau Sparks 16-yard pass from Brad Jackson, Tyler Robles kick (Drive: 9 plays, 95 yards, 3:53; Texas State 24–7)
- (7:37) ULM – Aidan Armenta 12-yard run, Jacob Chambliss kick (Drive: 10 plays, 75 yards, 3:55; Texas State 24–14)
- (1:44) TXST – Brad Jackson 7-yard run, Tyler Robles kick (Drive: 11 plays, 72 yards, 5:53; Texas State 31–14)

Statistics	ULM	TXST
First downs	19	26
Plays–yards	61–300	75–422
Rushes–yards	35–134	43–221
Passing yards	166	201
Passing: Comp–Att–Int	19–26–0	25–32–1
Turnovers	0	1
Time of possession	27:53	32:07

Team	Category	Player	Statistics
Louisiana–Monroe	Passing	Aidan Armenta	19/26, 166 yards
Louisiana–Monroe	Rushing	Zach Palmer-Smith	15 carries, 80 yards, TD
Louisiana–Monroe	Receiving	JP Coulter	3 receptions, 56 yards
Texas State	Passing	Brad Jackson	25/32, 201 yards, 2 TD, INT
Texas State	Rushing	Brad Jackson	15 carries, 88 yards, 2 TD
Texas State	Receiving	Beau Sparks	10 receptions, 68 yards, TD

=== at Louisiana (Battle on the Bayou) ===
Game Twelve – Louisiana–Monroe Warhawks (3–8) at Louisiana Ragin' Cajuns (5–6) – Game summary

Quarter	1	2	3	4	OT	Total
Warhawks	13	0	0	14	0	27
Ragin' Cajuns	14	3	0	10	3	30

at Our Lady of Lourdes Stadium • Lafayette, LA

- Date: Saturday November 29, 2025
- Game time: 2:00 PM CDT
- Game weather: Cloudy • Temperature: 70 °F (21 °C) • Wind: SE 11 mph
- Game attendance: 16,270
- Referee: Ted Pitts
- TV announcers (ESPN+): Dan McDonald (play-by-play), Scott Brazda (analyst) and Ben Schafer (sideline)

Game information

First quarter

- (14:47) LA – Ja'Corian Norris 96-yard kickoff return, Tony Sterner kick (Drive: 0 plays, 0 yards, 0:25; Louisiana 7–0)
- (13:19) ULM – Nic Trujillo 25-yard pass from Aidan Armenta, Jacob Chambliss PAT blocked (Drive: 4 plays, 75 yards, 1:28; Louisiana 7–6)
- (8:59) ULM – Zach Palmer-Smith 7-yard run, Jacob Chambliss kick (Drive: 7 plays, 70 yards, 3:28; Louisiana–Monroe 13–7)
- (4:01) LA – Steven Blanco 4-yard run, Tony Sterner kick (Drive: 5 plays, 43 yards, 2:09; Louisiana 14–13)

Second quarter

- (8:04) LA – Tony Sterner 55-yard field goal (Drive: 10 plays, 42 yards, 4:52; Louisiana 17–13)

Third quarter

- No scoring plays.

Fourth quarter

- (14:50) ULM – Jonathan Bibbs 68-yard pass from Aidan Armenta, Makenzie Ryan kick (Drive: 3 plays, 80 yards, 0:41; Louisiana–Monroe 20–17)
- (12:49) LA – Bill Davis 76-yard run, Tony Sterner kick (Drive: 4 plays, 85 yards, 1:58; Louisiana 24–20)
- (9:32) ULM – Nic Trujillo 43-yard pass from Aidan Armenta, Makenzie Ryan kick (Drive: 5 plays, 75 yards, 3:17; Louisiana–Monroe 27–24)
- (3:36) LA – Tony Sterner 30-yard field goal (Drive: 11 plays, 63 yards, 5:50; Tied 27–27)

Overtime

- LA – Tony Sterner 19-yard field goal (Drive: 5 plays, 24 yards; Louisiana 30–27)

Statistics	ULM	LA
First downs	29	17
Plays–yards	76–516	68–338
Rushes–yards	43–205	38–212
Passing yards	311	126
Passing: Comp–Att–Int	19–33–1	16–30–0
Turnovers	2	0
Time of possession	30:08	29:52

Team	Category	Player	Statistics
Louisiana–Monroe	Passing	Aidan Armenta	19/31, 311 yards, 3 TD
Louisiana–Monroe	Rushing	Zach Palmer-Smith	20 carries, 114 yards, TD
Louisiana–Monroe	Receiving	Nic Trujillo	4 receptions, 133 yards, 2 TD
Louisiana	Passing	Lunch Winfield	10/21, 82 yards
Louisiana	Rushing	Bill Davis	15 carries, 126 yards, TD
Louisiana	Receiving	Bill Davis	4 receptions, 33 yards
