= 2025 Old Dominion Monarchs football team =

American college football season

2025 Old Dominion Monarchs football

Cure Bowl champion

Cure Bowl, W 24–10 vs. South Florida
- Conference: Sun Belt Conference
- East Division
- Record: 10–3 (6–2 Sun Belt)
- Head coach: Ricky Rahne (6th season)
- Offensive coordinator: Kevin Decker (3rd season)
- Offensive scheme: Veer and shoot
- Defensive coordinator: Blake Seiler (6th season)
- Base defense: 3–2–6
- Home stadium: S.B. Ballard Stadium

2025 Sun Belt Conference football standings
	Conf.			Overall
Team	W		L	W		L
East Division
No. 19 James Madison xy$^	8	–	0	12	–	2
Old Dominion	6	–	2	10	–	3
Coastal Carolina	5	–	3	6	–	7
Georgia Southern	4	–	4	7	–	6
Marshall	3	–	5	5	–	7
Appalachian State	2	–	6	5	–	8
Georgia State	0	–	8	1	–	11
West Division
Troy xy	6	–	2	8	–	6
Southern Miss	5	–	3	7	–	6
Louisiana	5	–	3	6	–	7
Arkansas State	5	–	3	7	–	6
Texas State	3	–	5	7	–	6
South Alabama	3	–	5	4	–	8
Louisiana–Monroe	1	–	7	3	–	9
Championship: James Madison 31, Troy 14
^ – College Football Playoff participant; $ – Conference champion; x – Division champion/co-champions; y – Championship game participant; Rankings from AP Poll

The 2025 Old Dominion Monarchs football team represented Old Dominion University in the Sun Belt Conference's East Division during the 2025 NCAA Division I FBS football season. The Monarchs were led by Ricky Rahne in his sixth year as the head coach. The Monarchs played their home games at S.B. Ballard Stadium, located in Norfolk, Virginia.

== Preseason ==
=== Media poll ===
In the Sun Belt preseason coaches' poll, the Monarchs were picked to finish fifth place in the East division.

Offensive lineman Zach Barlev and linebacker Jason Henderson was awarded to be in the preseason All-Sun Belt first team offense and defense for the fourth year in a row. Defensive lineman Kris Trinidad and linebacker Koa Naotala were named to the second team.

== Schedule ==
The football schedule was announced on February 28, 2025.

Date	Time	Opponent	Site	TV	Result	Attendance
August 30	2:30 p.m.	at No. 20 Indiana*	Memorial Stadium; Bloomington, IN	FS1	L 14–27	47,109
September 6	6:00 p.m.	North Carolina Central*	S.B. Ballard Stadium; Norfolk, VA	ESPN+	W 54–6	18,111
September 13	7:00 p.m.	at Virginia Tech*	Lane Stadium; Blacksburg, VA	ACCN	W 45–26	57,627
September 27	6:00 p.m.	Liberty*	S.B. Ballard Stadium; Norfolk, VA	ESPN+	W 21–7	18,435
October 4	6:00 p.m.	Coastal Carolina	S.B. Ballard Stadium; Norfolk, VA	ESPN+	W 47–7	20,895
October 11	3:30 p.m.	at Marshall	Joan C. Edwards Stadium; Huntington, WV	ESPN+	L 24–48	23,515
October 18	3:30 p.m.	at James Madison	Bridgeforth Stadium; Harrisonburg, VA (Royal Rivalry)	ESPNU	L 27–63	25,232
October 25	12:00 p.m.	Appalachian State^{†}	S.B. Ballard Stadium; Norfolk, VA	ESPNU	W 24–21	18,097
November 1	3:30 p.m.	at Louisiana–Monroe	Malone Stadium; Monroe, LA	ESPN+	W 31–6	17,087
November 13	7:30 p.m.	Troy	S.B. Ballard Stadium; Norfolk, VA	ESPN	W 33–0	18,831
November 22	1:00 p.m.	at Georgia Southern	Paulson Stadium; Statesboro, GA	ESPN+	W 45–10	19,247
November 29	2:00 p.m.	Georgia State	S.B. Ballard Stadium; Norfolk, VA (Oyster Bowl)	ESPN+	W 27–10	17,126
December 17	5:00 p.m.	vs. South Florida*	Camping World Stadium; Orlando, FL (Cure Bowl)	ESPN	W 24–10	15,036
*Non-conference game; ^{†}Homecoming; Rankings from AP Poll and CFP Rankings released prior to game; All times are in Eastern time

== Personnel ==
=== Transfers ===
Outgoing
Player	Position	New school
Khian'Dre Harris	CB	Albany
Ashton Whitner	S	Ball State
Keanon McNally	OT	Cal Poly
Anthony Patt	OL	Cal Poly
Fidel Pitts	WR	Cal Poly
Jaylon White-McClain	DE	Cincinnati
Jordan Holmes	CB	Duquesne
Rasheed Reason	CB	East Carolina
Ethan Sanchez	K	Houston
Grant Wilson	QB	Indiana
Spencer Dow	OL	Lehigh
Michael Flores	OL	Louisville
Denzel Lowry	DL	Louisville
Brock Walters	LS	Marshall
JC Cloutier	S	Mercyhurst
Emmett Morehead	QB	Minnesota
Jahron Manning	S	Mississippi State
Will Jones II	S	North Texas
Patrick Smith-Young	S	North Texas
Ronald Jackson Jr.	S	Ohio
Micheal Devereaux	LB	Southeast Missouri State
Amorie Morrison	DE	UAB
Bryce Duke	RB	Utah
Jaylen Pretlow	WR	Virginia State
Dominic Dutton	WR	Western Carolina
Markus Knight	S	Western Kentucky
Kelby Williams	WR	Western Kentucky
Tariq Sims	RB	William & Mary
Talyn Hunter	OL	Unknown
Jadon Furubotten	OL	Unknown
Justin McKithen	WR	Unknown
Angelo Rankin Jr.	DB	Unknown
Quan Dunbar	TE	Unknown
Myles Alston	WR	Withdrawn
Zach Hagedon	S	Unknown
Malachi Hinton	WR	Unknown
Ricardo Underwood	CB	Unknown
Exodus Anderson	IOL	Unknown
Ny'Len Ramon Jones	LB	Unknown
Ja'Mez Drummer	LB	Unknown
Caleb Bryant	OT	Unknown
Rick Moore	OT	Unknown

Incoming
Player	Position	Previous school
Riley Callaghan	K	Southeastern Louisiana
Botros Alisandro	DB	Purdue
Nickendre Stiger	S	Kansas State
Dawson Johnson	TE	Florida
Ronald Jackson Jr.	S	Montana
Ryan Joyce	OL	Fordham
Griffin Duggan	OL	Virginia Tech
Brendan Durkin	LS	New Mexico
Ke'Travion Hargrove	RB	Grambling State
James Carver	CB	Benedict
Sidney Mbanasor	WR	Tulane
Zach Hobson	CB	West Virginia State
Kollin Collier	S	TCU
Logan Cox	IOL	Kansas State

- Source: ON3, 247Sports

=== Recruiting class ===
College recruiting
Name	Hometown	School	Height	Weight	40^{‡}	Commit date
Carson Bradley; OT	Quincy, FL	Hutchinson CC	6 ft 6 in (1.98 m)	310 lb (140 kg)	–	Dec 4, 2024
Carson Bradley; OT	Recruit ratings: Rivals: 247Sports: ESPN: (76)					
Tre Brown; WR	Savannah, GA	Hutchinson CC	6 ft 2 in (1.88 m)	185 lb (84 kg)	–	Dec 4, 2024
Tre Brown; WR	Recruit ratings: Rivals: 247Sports: ESPN: (77)					
Braden Ellis; OT	Greensboro, NC	Northwest Guilford HS	6 ft 5 in (1.96 m)	280 lb (130 kg)	–	Dec 4, 2024
Braden Ellis; OT	Recruit ratings: Rivals: 247Sports: (NR)					

=== Roster ===
2025 Old Dominion Monarchs football team roster
Players
Coaches
Offense

Pos.	#	Name	Class
WR	0	TJ Lott	So
QB	1	Colton Joseph	So
WR	2	Tre Brown	Jr
RB	3	Devin Roche	So
QB	4	Ryan Huff	Fr
RB	5	Maurki James	Fr
WR	6	Ja'Cory Thomas	Jr
WR	7	Na'eem Abdul-Rahim Gladding	So
WR	8	Josh Rodriguez	Fr
TE	9	Jalen Butler	Jr
QB	10	Quinn Henicle	Fr
WR	11	TJ Johnson	Jr
WR	12	Titus Myers	So
WR	13	Dallas Sims	Fr
WR	14	Zay Prince	Fr
QB	16	Holden Brown	Fr
WR	17	Na'eem Gladding	So
RB	18	Ke'Travion Hargrove	Sr
TE	19	Dawson Johnson	Fr
RB	20	Trequan Jones	Jr
RB	40	Troy Marquez	Fr
OL	55	Maarten Woudsma	Jr
OL	58	Stephon Dubose-Borne	Sr
OL	61	Jake Scala	So
OL	62	Billy Gough	Sr
OL	63	Cam Hill	Fr
OL	64	Zach Barlev	Sr
OL	65	Ryan Joyce	Sr
OL	67	Kainan Miller	So
OL	69	Logan Cox	Jr
OL	70	Andy Silverthorn	Fr
OL	71	Jack Sheehan	Fr
OL	72	Colin Henrich	Sr
OL	73	Connor Drake	So
OL	74	Carson Bradley	So
OL	75	Skyler Grant	Sr
OL	77	Josh Schuetzmann	Fr
OL	78	Elijah Hoskin	Sr
OL	79	Theo Bachelder	Fr
TE	80	Chris Warren	Fr
TE	87	Trey Lancaster	Sr
TE	89	Nate Hartman	So

Defense

Pos.	#	Name	Class
LB	0	Mario Thompson	Jr
LB	1	Keshawn Thomas	Jr
S	2	Nickendre Stiger	Sr
S	3	Mario Easterly	Jr
S	4	Jeremy Mack Jr.	Sr
CB	5	Brandon Crutchfield	So
CB	7	Ryan Ramey	So
DB	8	Botros Alisandro	Sr
DL	9	DeAndre Lynch	So
LB	10	Koa Naotala	Jr
S	11	Kollin Collier	So
S	12	Jerome Carter	So
S	13	Jed Olotu-Judah	Fr
S	14	Marco Tyson	Jr
DB	15	Je'Hahj Sherrill	Fr
DB	17	CJ Floyd	Fr
LB	18	Jackson Forrest	Fr
DB	19	Lucas Struck	So
CB	20	Langston Williams	Sr
S	21	Zion Frink	So
LB	22	AJ Ashworth	Fr
DB	23	Jorian Haynes	So
LB	24	Dirrick Goodman	So
CB	25	Zach Hobson	Sr
CB	27	Jordan Saunders	So
DB	28	Chris Boykins	Fr
S	29	Tavares Murray	Fr
DL	30	Fred Giles	Jr
LB	31	Jayden Sheppard	Jr
S	33	Daevon Iles	So
LB	34	Jahleel Culbreath	Jr
DL	36	Javen Gibson	Jr
CB	37	Caleb Bishop	Fr
LB	38	Seth Naotala	Sr
DL	40	Hunter Malecki	Fr
LB	41	Gage Sawyers	So
LB	42	Jason Henderson	Sr
DE	43	Kris Trinidad	Sr
LB	44	Justin Kalitsnik	Fr
LB	46	Edward Mills	Fr
DL	50	Chris Forbes	Fr
DL	52	Jonathan Bacigalupi	Jr
DL	53	Idrissa Kamara	Fr
DT	54	Jackson Banks	So
DL	75	Lorenzo McFadden-Pressley	Fr
DT	94	Ricardo Williams Jr.	Sr
DL	95	Ahmaad Foster	Fr
EDGE	97	Ledarrion Menter	Fr
DL	98	Christopher Spencer	Jr
DT	99	Cole Daniels	Sr

Special teams -->

Pos.	#	Name	Class
LS	30	Brendan Durkin	Jr
LS	47	Ashten Dunman	Fr
K	49	Ethan Chang	Sr
LS	57	Ryan Harvey	Sr
K	93	Nathanial Eichner	Jr
K	94	Riley Callaghan	Sr
LS	94	Brandon Richards	Sr
P	96	Ian Brandt	So
P	97	Seamus Hall	Sr

Head coach

- Ricky Rahne (Cornell)

Coordinators/assistant coaches

- Kevin Decker
  Offensive coordinator/quarterbacks
- Blake Seiler
  Defensive coordinator/inside linebackers
- Kevin Smith
  Special teams coordinator/outside linebackers
- Alex Huettel
  Offensive line
- Victor Irokansi
  Defensive line
- Tony Lucas
  Running backs/asst. head coach
- Dwike Wilson
  Cornerbacks
- Remington Rebstock
  Safeties/asst. defensive coordinator
- Kody Cook
  Wide receivers
- David Weeks
  Tight ends
- Chad Snodgrass
  Director of sports performance
- Tristan Iannone
  Director of operations
- Hunter Sims
  General manager

Legend

- (C) Team captain
- (S) Suspended
- (I) Ineligible
- Injured
- Redshirt

Roster

== Game summaries ==
=== at No. 20 Indiana ===
Old Dominion Monarchs (0–0) at No. 20 Indiana Hoosiers (0–0) – Game summary

Quarter	1	2	3	4	Total
Monarchs	7	0	0	7	14
No. 20 Hoosiers	7	10	10	0	27

at Memorial Stadium • Bloomington, IN

- Date: August 30, 2025
- Game time: 2:30 p.m.
- Game weather: Sunny • Temperature: 75 °F (24 °C) • Wind: NE 8 mph
- Game attendance: 47,109
- Referee: Tim O'Dey
- TV announcers (FS1): Noah Reed (play-by-play) and Robert Smith (analyst)

Game information

First quarter

- ODU – Colton Joseph 75-yard run (Riley Callaghan kick), 14:49. Monarchs 7–0. Drive: 1 play, 75 yards, 0:11.
- IU – Jonathan Brady 91-yard punt return (Nico Radicic kick), 0:09. Tied 7–7.

Second quarter

- IU – Nico Radicic 22-yard field goal, 10:03. Hoosiers 10–7. Drive: 8 plays, 51 yards, 3:35.
- IU – Fernando Mendoza 5-yard run (Nico Radicic kick), 3:36. Hoosiers 17–7. Drive: 3 plays, 5 yards, 0:15.

Third quarter

- IU – Kaelon Black 2-yard run (Nico Radicic kick), 11:09. Hoosiers 24–7. Drive: 8 plays, 75 yards, 3:51.
- IU – Nico Radicic 25-yard field goal, 3:02. Hoosiers 27–7. Drive: 13 plays, 69 yards, 6:58.

Fourth quarter

- ODU – Colton Joseph 78-yard run (Riley Callaghan kick), 6:53. Hoosiers 27–14. Drive: 4 plays, 97 yards, 1:21.

Win Probability

- Old Dominion +1200 / Indiana -3000

Line

- Old Dominion +23.5 / Indiana -23.5

Over/Under

- Over/Under 53.5

Statistics	ODU	IU
First downs	10	29
Total yards	45–314	89–502
Rushing yards	23–218	57–309
Passing yards	96	193
Passing: Comp–Att–Int	11–22–3	18–32–0
Turnovers	3	1
Time of possession	18:32	41:28

Team	Category	Player	Statistics
Old Dominion	Passing	Colton Joseph	11/22, 96 yards, 3 INT
Old Dominion	Rushing	Colton Joseph	10 carries, 179 yards, 2 TD
Old Dominion	Receiving	Naeem Abdul-Rahim Gladding	4 receptions, 35 yards
Indiana	Passing	Fernando Mendoza	18/31, 193 yards
Indiana	Rushing	Roman Hemby	23 carries, 111 yards
Indiana	Receiving	Omar Cooper Jr.	2 receptions, 52 yards

=== North Carolina Central (FCS) ===
North Carolina Central Eagles (FCS) (1–1) at Old Dominion Monarchs (0–1) – Game summary

Quarter	1	2	3	4	Total
Eagles (FCS)	0	3	3	0	6
Monarchs	9	7	28	10	54

at S.B. Ballard Stadium • Norfolk, VA

- Date: September 6, 2025
- Game time: 6:00 p.m.
- Game weather: Partly Cloudy • Temperature: 90 °F (32 °C) • Wind: S 10 mph
- Game attendance: 18,111
- TV announcers (ESPN+): Scott Jackson (play-by-play) and Andy Mashaw (analyst)

Game information

First Quarter

- ODU – Tre' Brown III safety, 5:21. Monarchs 2–0. Drive: 4 plays, -9 yards, 2:00.
- ODU – Trequan Jones 39-yard run (Riley Callaghan kick), 1:59. Monarchs 9–0. Drive: 7 plays, 62 yards, 3:17.

Second Quarter

- ODU – Na'eem Abdul-Rahim Gladding III 6-yard pass from Colton Joseph (Riley Callaghan kick), 2:30. Monarchs 16–0. Drive: 7 plays, 69 yards, 2:26.
- NCCU – Kaleb Robison 39-yard field goal, 0:04. Monarchs 16–3. Drive: 8 plays, 61 yards, 2:18.

Third Quarter

- ODU – Trequan Jones 93-yard run (Riley Callaghan kick), 11:42. Monarchs 23–3. Drive: 1 play, 93 yards, 0:12.
- ODU – Ja'Cory Thomas 4-yard pass from Colton Joseph (Riley Callaghan kick), 7:09. Monarchs 30–3. Drive: 8 plays, 79 yards, 3:33.
- ODU – Colton Joseph 2-yard run (Riley Callaghan kick), 5:19. Monarchs 37–3. Drive: 3 plays, 18 yards, 1:23.
- ODU – TJ Lott 34-yard pass from Colton Joseph (Riley Callaghan kick), 2:24. Monarchs 44–3. Drive: 4 plays, 36 yards, 0:42.
- NCCU – Kaleb Robison 27-yard field goal, 0:13. Monarchs 44–6. Drive: 5 plays, 46 yards, 2:03.

Fourth Quarter

- ODU – Trequan Jones 14-yard run (Riley Callaghan kick), 10:22. Monarchs 51–6. Drive: 5 plays, 47 yards, 1:44.
- ODU – Riley Callaghan 47-yard field goal, 6:13. Monarchs 54–6. Drive: 5 plays, 19 yards, 2:32.

Win Probability

- NC Central +1000 / Old Dominion -2000

Line

- NC Central +21.5 / Old Dominion -21.5

Over/Under

- Over/Under 48.5

Statistics	NCCU	ODU
First downs	13	25
Total yards	64–224	63–545
Rushing yards	38–136	34–268
Passing yards	88	277
Passing: Comp–Att–Int	12–26–2	22–29–0
Turnovers	3	1
Time of possession	31:37	28:23

Team	Category	Player	Statistics
NC Central	Passing	Walker Harris	12/25, 88 yards, 2 INT
NC Central	Rushing	Joshua Jones	9 carries, 65 yards
NC Central	Receiving	Chance Peterson	5 receptions, 46 yards
Old Dominion	Passing	Colton Joseph	19/24, 257 yards, 3 TD
Old Dominion	Rushing	Trequan Jones	5 carries, 163 yards, 3 TD
Old Dominion	Receiving	Ja'Cory Thomas	6 receptions, 86 yards, TD

=== at Virginia Tech ===
Old Dominion Monarchs (1–1) at Virginia Tech Hokies (0–2) – Game summary

Quarter	1	2	3	4	Total
Monarchs	7	21	10	7	45
Hokies	0	0	7	19	26

at Lane Stadium • Blacksburg, VA

- Date: September 13, 2025
- Game time: 7:00 p.m.
- Game weather: Sunny • Temperature: 78 °F (26 °C) • Wind: NW 1 mph
- Game attendance: 57,627
- Referee: Darryl DeBerry
- TV announcers (ACCN): Jorge Sedano (play-by-play), Jay Walker (analyst) and Victoria Arlen (sideline)

Game information

First quarter

- ODU – Colton Joseph 6-yard run (Riley Callaghan kick), 6:30. Monarchs 7–0. Drive: 5 plays, 93 yards, 2:24.

Second quarter

- ODU – Maurki James 10-yard run (Riley Callaghan kick), 12:38. Monarchs 14–0. Drive: 7 plays, 97 yards, 3:25.
- ODU – Trequan Jones 11-yard run (Riley Callaghan kick), 6:44. Monarchs 21–0. Drive: 9 plays, 88 yards, 3:31.
- ODU – Tre' Brown III 13-yard pass from Colton Joseph (Riley Callaghan kick), 0:53. Monarchs 28–0. Drive: 8 plays, 77 yards, 1:53.

Third quarter

- ODU – Riley Callaghan 50-yard field goal, 9:54. Monarchs 31–0. Drive: 8 plays, 24 yards, 3:05.
- VT – Donavon Greene 10-yard pass from Kyron Drones (John Love kick), 4:32. Monarchs 31–7. Drive: 3 plays, 77 yards, 0:44.
- ODU – Na'eem Abdul-Rahim Gladding 13-yard pass from Colton Joseph (Riley Callaghan kick), 1:49. Monarchs 38–7. Drive: 5 plays, 46 yards, 2:42.

Fourth quarter

- VT – Kyron Drones 4-yard run (pass failed), 12:06. Monarchs 38–13. Drive: 12 plays, 82 yards, 4:38.
- ODU – Devin Roche 15-yard run (Riley Callaghan kick), 7:02. Monarchs 45–13. Drive: 7 plays, 75 yards, 5:04.
- VT – Donavon Greene 23-yard pass from Kyron Drones (run failed), 4:20. Monarchs 45–19. Drive: 7 plays, 58 yards, 2:34.
- VT – Tyler Mason 3-yard pass from Kyron Drones (John Love kick), 1:56. Monarchs 45–26. Drive: 9 plays, 54 yards, 2:23.

Win Probability

- Old Dominion +190 / Virginia Tech -225

Line

- Old Dominion +5.5 / Virginia Tech -5.5

Over/Under

- Over/Under 50.5

Statistics	ODU	VT
First downs	29	24
Plays–yards	61–527	73–433
Rushes–yards	39–251	34–167
Passing yards	276	266
Passing: comp–att–int	16–22–0	26–39–1
Turnovers	1	3
Time of possession	29:57	30:03

Team	Category	Player	Statistics
Old Dominion	Passing	Colton Joseph	16/22, 276 yards, 2 TD
Old Dominion	Rushing	Trequan Jones	13 carries, 101 yards, TD
Old Dominion	Receiving	Ja'Cory Thomas	3 receptions, 83 yards
Virginia Tech	Passing	Kyron Drones	26/39, 266 yards, 3 TD, INT
Virginia Tech	Rushing	Kyron Drones	18 carries, 65 yards, TD
Virginia Tech	Receiving	Donavon Greene	5 receptions, 77 yards, 2 TD

=== Liberty ===
Liberty Flames (1–3) at Old Dominion Monarchs (2–1) – Game summary

Quarter	1	2	3	4	Total
Flames	0	0	7	0	7
Monarchs	0	14	0	7	21

at S.B. Ballard Stadium • Norfolk, VA

- Date: September 27, 2025
- Game time: 6:00 p.m.
- Game weather: Rain • Temperature: 78 °F (26 °C) • Wind: NW 5 mph
- Game attendance: 18,435
- Referee: Douglas Mercer
- TV announcers (ESPN+): Scott Jackson (play-by-play) and Andy Mashaw (analyst)

Game information

First quarter

- No scoring plays.

Second quarter

- (7:34) ODU – TJ Johnson 22-yard pass from Colton Joseph, Riley Callaghan kick (Drive: 5 plays, 69 yards, 1:54; Old Dominion 7–0)
- (4:01) ODU – Ja'Cory Thomas 31-yard pass from Colton Joseph, Riley Callaghan kick (Drive: 4 plays, 78 yards, 1:18; Old Dominion 14–0)

Third quarter

- (9:11) LIB – Julian Gray 4-yard run, Jay Billingsley kick (Drive: 4 plays, 64 yards, 1:45; Old Dominion 14–7)

Fourth quarter

- (13:17) ODU – Ja'Cory Thomas 55-yard pass from Colton Joseph, Riley Callaghan kick (Drive: 2 plays, 56 yards, 0:40; Old Dominion 21–7)

Statistics	LIB	ODU
First downs	12	25
Plays–yards	56–210	71–489
Rushes–yards	44–133	45–218
Passing yards	77	271
Passing: Comp–Att–Int	6–12–1	18–26–1
Turnovers	3	4
Time of possession	26:38	31:19

Team	Category	Player	Statistics
Liberty	Passing	Michael Merdinger	6/11, 77 yards
Liberty	Rushing	Caden Williams	19 carries, 92 yards
Liberty	Receiving	Donte Lee Jr.	1 reception, 53 yards
Old Dominion	Passing	Colton Joseph	18/26, 271 yards, 3 TD, INT
Old Dominion	Rushing	Colton Joseph	15 carries, 76 yards
Old Dominion	Receiving	Ja'Cory Thomas	5 receptions, 114 yards, 2 TD

=== Coastal Carolina ===
Coastal Carolina Chanticleers (2–2) at Old Dominion Monarchs (3–1) – Game summary

Quarter	1	2	3	4	Total
Chanticleers	0	0	0	7	7
Monarchs	10	24	10	3	47

at S.B. Ballard Stadium • Norfolk, VA

- Date: October 4, 2025
- Game time: 6:00 p.m.
- Game weather: Sunny • Temperature: 72 °F (22 °C) • Wind: SE 3 mph
- Game attendance: 20,895
- Referee: Ted Pitts
- TV announcers (ESPN+): Scott Jackson (play-by-play) and Andy Mashaw (analyst)

Game information

First qquarter

- (11:44) ODU – Na'eem Abdul-Rahim Gladding 3-yard pass from Colton Joseph, Riley Callaghan kick (Drive: 9 plays, 87 yards, 3:11; Old Dominion 7–0)
- (2:19) ODU – Riley Callaghan 27-yard field goal (Drive: 10 plays, 70 yards, 4:37; Old Dominion 10–0)

Second quarter

- (12:54) ODU – Ke'Travion Hargrove 80-yard pass from Colton Joseph, Riley Callaghan kick (Drive: 1 play, 80 yards, 0:10; Old Dominion 17–0)
- (6:05) ODU – Na'eem Abdul-Rahim Gladding 13-yard pass from Colton Joseph, Riley Callaghan kick (Drive: 8 plays, 71 yards, 2:32; Old Dominion 24–0)
- (4:48) ODU – Riley Callaghan 34-yard field goal (Drive: 5 plays, 12 yards, 0:54; Old Dominion 27–0)
- (2:48) ODU – Na'eem Abdul-Rahim Gladding 10-yard pass from Colton Joseph, Riley Callaghan kick (Drive: 2 plays, 28 yards, 0:26; Old Dominion 34–0)

Third quarter

- (12:50) ODU – Colton Joseph 50-yard run, Riley Callaghan kick (Drive: 5 plays, 66 yards, 1:05; Old Dominion 41–0)
- (7:02) ODU – Riley Callaghan 22-yard field goal (Drive: 12 plays, 54 yards, 4:03; Old Dominion 44–0)

Fourth quarter

- (12:20) CCU – Cameron Wright 3-yard pass from Tad Hudson, Kian Afrookhteh kick (Drive: 12 plays, 68 yards, 4:06; Old Dominion 44–7)
- (1:56) ODU – Riley Callaghan 26-yard field goal (Drive: 9 plays, 62 yards, 4:52; Old Dominion 47–7)

Statistics	CCU	ODU
First downs	12	30
Plays–yards	67–189	77–619
Rushes–yards	37–81	43–302
Passing yards	108	317
Passing: Comp–Att–Int	19–30–1	18–34–0
Turnovers	2	1
Time of possession	30:26	29:34

Team	Category	Player	Statistics
Coastal Carolina	Passing	Tad Hudson	19/30, 108 yards, TD, INT
Coastal Carolina	Rushing	Ja'Vin Simpkins	8 carries, 39 yards
Coastal Carolina	Receiving	Eli Aragon	4 receptions, 35 yards
Old Dominion	Passing	Colton Joseph	17/30, 315 yards, 4 TD
Old Dominion	Rushing	Trequan Jones	14 carries, 98 yards
Old Dominion	Receiving	Na'eem Abdul-Rahim Gladding	7 receptions, 101 yards, 3 TD

=== at Marshall ===
Old Dominion Monarchs (4–1) at Marshall Thundering Herd (2–3) – Game summary

Quarter	1	2	3	4	Total
Monarchs	7	3	0	14	24
Thundering Herd	7	17	17	7	48

at Joan C. Edwards Stadium • Huntington, WV

- Date: October 11, 2025
- Game time: 3:30 p.m.
- Game weather: Sunny
- Game attendance: 23,515
- Referee: Scott Broadway
- TV announcers (ESPN+): Keith Morehouse (play-by-play), Mark Martin (analyst) and Ben Westfall (sideline)

Game information

First quarter

- (4:57) MRSH – Boogie Trotter 22-yard interception return, Lorcan Quinn kick (Marshall 7–0)
- (0:47) ODU – Tre Brown 71-yard pass from Colton Joseph, Riley Callaghan kick (Drive: 3 plays, 66 yards, 1:11; Tied 7–7)

Second quarter

- (13:52) MRSH – Michael Allen 49-yard pass from Carlos Del Rio-Wilson, Lorcan Quinn kick (Drive: 5 plays, 75 yards, 1:55; Marshall 14–7)
- (3:10) MRSH – Lorcan Quinn 20-yard field goal (Drive: 11 plays, 54 yards, 5:08; Marshall 17–7)
- (1:23) MRSH – Carlos Del Rio-Wilson 6-yard run, Lorcan Quinn kick (Drive: 3 plays, 39 yards, 1:01; Marshall 24–7)
- (0:24) ODU – Riley Callaghan 42-yard field goal (Drive: 8 plays, 51 yards, 0:59; Marshall 24–10)

Third quarter

- (8:45) MRSH – Antwan Roberts 26-yard run, Lorcan Quinn kick (Drive: 2 plays, 28 yards, 0:36; Marshall 31–10)
- (5:47) MRSH – Demarcus Lacey 15-yard pass from Carlos Del Rio-Wilson, Lorcan Quinn kick (Drive: 5 plays, 65 yards, 2:06; Marshall 38–10)
- (2:11) MRSH – Lorcan Quinn 46-yard field goal (Drive: 4 plays, 6 yards, 2:32; Marshall 41–10)

Fourth quarter

- (9:07) MRSH – Carlos Del Rio-Wilson 2-yard run, Lorcan Quinn kick (Drive: 5 plays, 22 yards, 2:52; Marshall 48–10)
- (6:56) ODU – Colton Joseph 4-yard run, Riley Callaghan kick (Drive: 8 plays, 75 yards, 2:11; Marshall 48–17)
- (0:48) ODU – Maurki James 1-yard run, Riley Callaghan kick (Drive: 14 plays, 80 yards, 3:57; Marshall 48–24)

Statistics	ODU	MRSH
First downs	15	22
Plays–yards	66–439	76–445
Rushes–yards	38–173	50–223
Passing yards	266	222
Passing: Comp–Att–Int	15–28–2	18–26–0
Turnovers	5	0
Time of possession	23:25	36:35

Team	Category	Player	Statistics
Old Dominion	Passing	Colton Joseph	15/28, 266 yards, TD, 2 INT
Old Dominion	Rushing	Maurki James	12 carries, 83 yards, TD
Old Dominion	Receiving	Tre Brown	1 reception, 71 yards, TD
Marshall	Passing	Carlos Del Rio-Wilson	17/24, 219 yards, 2 TD
Marshall	Rushing	Carlos Del Rio-Wilson	17 carries, 95 yards, 2 TD
Marshall	Receiving	Demarcus Lacey	8 receptions, 121 yards, TD

=== at James Madison (Royal Rivalry) ===
Old Dominion Monarchs (4–2) at James Madison Dukes (5–1) – Game summary

Quarter	1	2	3	4	Total
Monarchs	20	7	0	0	27
Dukes	14	14	21	14	63

at Bridgeforth Stadium • Harrisonburg, VA

- Date: October 18, 2025
- Game time: 3:30 p.m. EDT
- Game weather: Sunny • Temperature: 75 °F (24 °C) • Wind: S 5 mph
- Game attendance: 25,232
- Referee: Marshall Lewis
- TV announcers (ESPNU): Jay Alter (play-by-play) and Rocky Boiman (analyst)

Game information

First quarter

- (14:54) ODU – Lucas Struck 2-yard fumble return, Riley Callaghan (Drive: 5 plays, 78 yards, 2:25; Old Dominion 7–0)
- (12:23) JMU – Alonza Barnett III 58-yard run, Morgan Suarez kick (Drive: 5 plays, 78 yards, 2:25; Tied 7–7)
- (3:56) ODU – Tre' Brown III 98-yard pass from Colton Joseph, Riley Callaghan kick (Drive: 1 play, 98 yards, 0:14; Old Dominion 14–7)
- (3:05) JMU – Nick DeGennaro 65-yard pass from Alonza Barnett III, Morgan Suarez kick (Drive: 2 plays, 75 yards, 0:51; Tied 14–14)
- (0:19) ODU – Tre' Brown III 11-yard pass from Colton Joseph, Riley Callaghan PAT failed (Drive: 8 plays, 75 yards, 2:46; Old Dominion 20–14)

Second quarter

- (12:00) JMU – Nick DeGennaro 7-yard pass from Alonza Barnett III, Morgan Suarez kick (Drive: 7 plays, 75 yards, 3:19; James Madison 21–20)
- (6:49) ODU – Dawson Johnson 16-yard pass from Colton Joseph, Riley Callaghan kick (Drive: 11 plays, 75 yards, 5:11; Old Dominion 27–21)
- (1:57) JMU – Jordan Fuller 2-yard run, Morgan Suarez kick (Drive: 9 plays, 75 yards, 4:52; James Madison 28–27)

Third quarter

- (10:49) JMU – Wayne Knight 13-yard run, Morgan Suarez kick (Drive: 8 plays, 57 yards, 4:04; James Madison 35–27)
- (3:57) JMU – Alonza Barnett III 6-yard run, Morgan Suarez kick (Drive: 5 plays, 26 yards, 2:48; James Madison 42–27)
- (0:30) JMU – Alonza Barnett III 3-yard run, Morgan Suarez kick (Drive: 4 plays, 43 yards, 2:20; James Madison 49–27)

Fourth quarter

- (12:28) JMU – Alonza Barnett III 8-yard run, Morgan Suarez kick (Drive: 5 plays, 45 yards, 2:08; James Madison 56–27)
- (2:57) JMU – Za'Ron Collins 18-yard pass from Matthew Sluka, Morgan Suarez kick (Drive: 9 plays, 52 yards, 5:32; James Madison 63–27)

Statistics	ODU	JMU
First downs	13	27
Plays–yards	50–285	79–624
Rushes–yards	29–76	53–311
Passing yards	209	313
Passing: Comp–Att–Int	13–21–2	18–26–09
Turnovers	3	1
Time of possession	18:34	41:26

Team	Category	Player	Statistics
Old Dominion	Passing	Colton Joseph	13/21, 209 yards, 3 TD, 2 INT
Old Dominion	Rushing	Devin Roche	7 carries, 34 yards
Old Dominion	Receiving	Tre Brown III	4 receptions, 138 yards, 2 TD
James Madison	Passing	Alonza Barnett III	17/25, 295 yards, 2 TD
James Madison	Rushing	Alonza Barnett III	17 carries, 153 yards, 4 TD
James Madison	Receiving	Nick DeGennaro	3 receptions, 106 yards, 2 TD

=== Appalachian State ===
Appalachian State Mountaineers (4–3) at Old Dominion Monarchs (4–3) – Game summary

Quarter	1	2	3	4	Total
Mountaineers	0	7	0	14	21
Monarchs	7	3	14	0	24

at S.B. Ballard Stadium • Norfolk, VA

- Date: October 25, 2025
- Game time: 12:00 p.m. EDT
- Game weather: Sunny • Temperature: 59 °F (15 °C) • Wind: 14 mph
- Game attendance: 18,097
- TV announcers (ESPNU): Doug Sherman (play-by-play) and Tyoka Jackson (analyst)

Game information

First quarter

- (8:24) ODU – Ke'Travion Hargrove 70-yard pass from Colton Joseph, Riley Callaghan kick (Drive: 2 plays, 85 yards, 0:39; Old Dominion 7–0)

Second quarter

- (2:10) ODU – Riley Callaghan 33-yard field goal (Drive: 10 plays, 50 yards, 4:53; Old Dominion 10–0)
- (0:30) APP – Jaden Barnes 16-yard pass from JJ Kohl, Dominic De Freitas kick (Drive: 12 plays, 75 yards, 1:40; Old Dominion 10–7)

Third quarter

- (10:02) ODU – Na'eem Abdul-Rahim Gladdling 16-yard pass from Colton Joseph, Riley Callaghan kick (Drive: 8 plays, 49 yards, 3:55; Old Dominion 17–7)
- (0:26) ODU – Ja'Cory Thomas 24-yard pass from Colton Joseph, Riley Callaghan kick (Drive: 7 plays, 61 yards, 3:03; Old Dominion 24–7)

Fourth quarter

- (9:26) APP – Kanen Hamlett 35-yard pass from AJ Swann, Dominic De Freitas kick (Drive: 7 plays, 91 yards, 1:57; Old Dominion 24–14)
- (1:35) APP – Davion Dozier 34-yard pass from AJ Swann, Dominic De Freitas kick (Drive: 9 plays, 79 yards, 1:47; Old Dominion 24–21)

Statistics	APP	ODU
First downs	23	26
Plays–yards	72–374	80–459
Rushes–yards	18–73	45–149
Passing yards	301	310
Passing: Comp–Att–Int	32–54–2	21–35–1
Turnovers	2	1
Time of possession	24:41	35:19

Team	Category	Player	Statistics
Appalachian State	Passing	AJ Swann	12/16, 140 yards, 2 TD
Appalachian State	Rushing	Rashod Dubinion	9 carries, 51 yards
Appalachian State	Receiving	Davion Dozier	4 receptions, 75 yards, TD
Old Dominion	Passing	Colton Joseph	21/35, 310 yards, 3 TD, INT
Old Dominion	Rushing	Colton Joseph	18 carries, 61 yards
Old Dominion	Receiving	Na'eem Abdul-Raheem Gladding	8 receptions, 105 yards, TD

=== at Louisiana–Monroe ===
Old Dominion Monarchs (5–3) at Louisiana–Monroe Warhawks (3–5) – Game summary

Quarter	1	2	3	4	Total
Monarchs	17	7	0	7	31
Warhawks	0	0	0	6	6

at Malone Stadium • Monroe, LA

- Date: November 1, 2025
- Game time: 3:30 p.m. EST
- Game weather: Cloudy • Temperature: 61 °F (16 °C) • Wind: N 3 mph
- Game attendance: 17,087
- Referee: Tim Barker
- TV announcers (ESPN+): Sean Fox (play-by-play) and Desmund Lighten (analyst)

Game information

First quarter

- (9:53) ODU – Ke'Travion Hargrove 12-yard run, Nathanial Eichner kick (Drive: 3 plays, 29 yards, 0:40; Old Dominion 7–0)
- (4:00) ODU – Colton Joseph 7-yard run, Nathanial Eichner kick (Drive: 4 plays, 65 yards, 1:35; Old Dominion 14–0)
- (1:35) ODU – Nathanial Eichner 30-yard field goal (Drive: 6 plays, 21 yards, 2:16; Old Dominion 17–0)

Second quarter

- (9:09) ODU – Colton Joseph 14-yard run, Nathanial Eichner kick (Drive: 6 plays, 69 yards, 2:28; Old Dominion 24–0)

Third quarter

- No scoring plays.

Fourth quarter

- (12:29) ODU – Colton Joseph 1-yard run, Nathanial Eichner kick (Drive: 4 plays, 38 yards, 1:20; Old Dominion 31–0)
- (4:15) ULM – Rylan Green 4-yard pass from Aidan Armenta, two-point pass conversion attempt failed (Drive: 2 plays, 2 yards, 0:42; Old Dominion 31–6)

Statistics	ODU	ULM
First downs	20	11
Plays–yards	67–391	68–293
Rushes–yards	44–160	47–132
Passing yards	231	161
Passing: Comp–Att–Int	12–23–0	13–21–1
Turnovers	1	2
Time of possession	26:17	33:43

Team	Category	Player	Statistics
Old Dominion	Passing	Colton Joseph	12/22, 231 yards
Old Dominion	Rushing	Colton Joseph	16 carries, 72 yards, 3 TD
Old Dominion	Receiving	Tre Brown III	5 receptions, 83 yards
Louisiana–Monroe	Passing	Aidan Armenta	12/20, 152 yards, TD, INT
Louisiana–Monroe	Rushing	Zach Palmer-Smith	18 carries, 96 yards
Louisiana–Monroe	Receiving	JP Coulter	3 receptions, 54 yards

=== Troy ===
Troy Trojans (6–3) at Old Dominion Monarchs (6–3) – Game summary

Quarter	1	2	3	4	Total
Troy	0	0	0	0	0
Monarchs	10	10	6	7	33

at S.B. Ballard Stadium • Norfolk, VA

- Date: November 13, 2025
- Game time: 7:30 p.m. EST
- Game weather: Sunny • Temperature: 49 °F (9 °C) • Wind: SE 11 mph
- Game attendance: 18,831
- Referee: Steven Robinson
- TV announcers (ESPN): Matt Barrie (play-by-play), Tom Luginbill (analyst) and Harry Lyles Jr. (sideline)

Game information

First quarter

- (9:37) ODU – Ja'Cory Thomas 19-yard pass from Colton Joseph, Nathanial Eichner kick (Drive: 5 plays, 31 yards, 1:37; Old Dominion 7–0)
- (3:34) ODU – Nathanial Eichner 32-yard field goal (Drive: 8 plays, 44 yards, 3:06; Old Dominion 10–0)

Second quarter

- (10:16) ODU – Nathanial Eichner 28-yard field goal (Drive: 11 plays, 49 yards, 4:47; Old Dominion 13–0)
- (5:54) ODU – Colton Joseph 11-yard run, Nathanial Eichner kick (Drive: 3 plays, 62 yards, 0:42; Old Dominion 20–0)

Third quarter

- (8:57) ODU – Colton Joseph 25-yard run (Drive: 2 plays, 37 yards, 0:35; Old Dominion 26–0)

Fourth quarter

- (7:51) ODU – Trequan Jones 65-yard run, Nathanial Eichner kick (Drive: 5 plays, 89 yards, 2:30; Old Dominion 33–0)

Statistics	TROY	ODU
First downs	9	20
Plays–yards	57–138	68–503
Rushes–yards	34–26	47–351
Passing yards	112	152
Passing: Comp–Att–Int	13–23–1	11–21–0
Turnovers	2	0
Time of possession	29:45	30:15

Team	Category	Player	Statistics
Troy	Passing	Goose Crowder	11/21, 98 yards, INT
Troy	Rushing	Jah-Mal Williams	5 carries, 16 yards
Troy	Receiving	Roman Mothershed	3 receptions, 37 yards
Old Dominion	Passing	Colton Joseph	10/20, 147 yards, TD
Old Dominion	Rushing	Devin Roche	16 carries, 145 yards
Old Dominion	Receiving	Tre Brown III	5 receptions, 112 yards

=== at Georgia Southern ===
Old Dominion Monarchs (7–3) at Georgia Southern Eagles (5–5) – Game summary

Quarter	1	2	3	4	Total
Monarchs	14	17	14	0	45
Eagles	0	0	3	7	10

at Paulson Stadium • Statesboro, GA

- Date: November 22, 2025
- Game time: 1:00 p.m. EST
- Game weather: Sunny • Temperature: 77 °F (25 °C)
- Game attendance: 19,247
- Referee: Scott Broadway
- TV announcers (ESPN+): Danny Waugh (play-by-play), Jayson Foster (analyst) and Whitney Haworth (sideline)

Game information

First quarter

- (13:10) ODU – Ke'Travion Hargrove 1-yard run, Nathanial Eichner kick (Drive: 3 plays, 27 yards, 1:13; Old Dominion 7–0)
- (7:15) ODU – Devin Roche 21-yard run, Nathanial Eichner kick (Drive: 7 plays, 66 yards, 3:06; Old Dominion 14–0)

Second quarter

- (14:57) ODU – Nathanial Eichner 28-yard field goal (Drive: 11 plays, 36 yards, 3:43; Old Dominion 17–0)
- (9:57) ODU – Jailen Butler 16-yard pass from Colton Joseph, Nathanial Eichner kick (Drive: 7 plays, 70 yards, 3:13; Old Dominion 24–0)
- (3:53) ODU – Ke'Travion Hargrove 2-yard run, Nathanial Eichner kick (Drive: 8 plays, 80 yards, 3:38; Old Dominion 31–0)

Third quarter

- (9:56) ODU – Ke'Travion Hargrove 12-yard run, Nathanial Eichner kick (Drive: 10 plays, 75 yards, 5:04; Old Dominion 38–0)
- (6:53) GASO – Tripp Bryant 26-yard field goal (Drive: 10 plays, 70 yards, 2:57; Old Dominion 38–3)
- (2:02) ODU – Colton Joseph 20-yard run, Nathanial Eichner kick (Drive: 10 plays, 75 yards, 4:51; Old Dominion 45–3)

Fourth quarter

- (0:29) GASO – Dylan Gary 11-yard pass from Turner Helton, Tripp Bryant kick (Drive: 5 plays, 22 yards, 2:00; Old Dominion 45–10)

Statistics	ODU	GASO
First downs	32	13
Plays–yards	80–551	61–249
Rushes–yards	57–376	19–49
Passing yards	175	200
Passing: Comp–Att–Int	14–23–0	27–42–1
Turnovers	1	1
Time of possession	34:35	24:25

Team	Category	Player	Statistics
Old Dominion	Passing	Colton Joseph	12/18, 140 yards, TD
Old Dominion	Rushing	Colton Joseph	20 carries, 189 yards, TD
Old Dominion	Receiving	Ja'Cory Thomas	2 receptions, 51 yards
Georgia Southern	Passing	JC French IV	16/24, 147 yards, INT
Georgia Southern	Rushing	Taeo Todd	7 carries, 25 yards
Georgia Southern	Receiving	Marcus Sanders Jr.	4 receptions, 88 yards

=== Georgia State (Oyster Bowl) ===
Georgia State Panthers (1–10) at Old Dominion Monarchs (8–3) – Game summary

Quarter	1	2	3	4	Total
Panthers	0	10	0	0	10
Monarchs	0	10	17	0	27

at S.B. Ballard Stadium • Norfolk, VA

- Date: November 29, 2025
- Game time: 2:00 p.m. EST
- Game weather: Sunny • Temperature: 44 °F (7 °C) • Wind: SE 8 mph
- Game attendance: 17,126
- Referee: Brandon Kirkland
- TV announcers (ESPN+): Scott Jackson (play-by-play) and Andy Mashaw (analyst)

Game information

First quarter

- No scoring plays.

Second quarter

- (11:26) GAST – Derrick Avery Jr. 4-yard pass from Christian Veilleux, Liam Rickman kick (Drive: 5 plays, 67 yards, 2:00; Georgia State 7–0)
- (9:56) GAST – Liam Rickman 36-yard field goal (Drive: 6 plays, 6 yards, 1:19; Georgia State 10–0)
- (5:34) ODU – Nathanial Eichner 19-yard field goal (Drive: 11 plays, 70 yards, 4:09; Georgia State 10–3)
- (4:16) ODU – Devin Roche 9-yard run, Nathanial Eichner kick (Drive: 2 plays, 20 yards, 0:27; Tied 10–10)

Third quarter

- (10:46) ODU – Nathanial Eichner 22-yard field goal (Drive: 6 plays, 29 yards, 2:08; Old Dominion 13–10)
- (6:03) ODU – Devin Roche 3-yard run, Nathanial Eichner kick (Drive: 7 plays, 94 yards, 2:55; Old Dominion 20–10)
- (0:59) ODU – Colton Joseph 14-yard run, Nathanial Eichner kick (Drive: 6 plays, 80 yards, 3:17; Old Dominion 27–10)

Fourth quarter

- No scoring plays.

Statistics	GAST	ODU
First downs	15	27
Plays–yards	67–283	76–409
Rushes–yards	30–129	54–303
Passing yards	154	106
Passing: Comp–Att–Int	18–37–1	9–22–1
Turnovers	1	2
Time of possession	27:32	32:28

Team	Category	Player	Statistics
Georgia State	Passing	Christian Veilleux	18/37, 154 yards, TD, INT
Georgia State	Rushing	Jordon Simmons	17 carries, 88 yards
Georgia State	Receiving	Ted Hurst	7 receptions, 76 yards
Old Dominion	Passing	Colton Joseph	9/22, 106 yards, INT
Old Dominion	Rushing	Devin Roche	21 carries, 137 yards, 2 TD
Old Dominion	Receiving	Ja'Cory Thomas	4 receptions, 64 yards

=== vs. South Florida (Cure Bowl) ===
2025 StaffDNA Cure Bowl
Old Dominion Monarchs (9–3) vs. South Florida Bulls (9–3) – Game summary

Quarter	1	2	3	4	Total
Monarchs	7	10	0	7	24
Bulls	3	7	0	0	10

at Camping World Stadium • Orlando, FL

- Date: December 17
- Game time: 5:00 p.m. EST
- Game weather: Cloudy • Temperature: 72 °F (22 °C) • Wind: E 10 mph
- Game attendance: 15,036
- Referee: Ron Hudson
- TV announcers (ESPN): Dave Neal (play-by-play), Fozzy Whittaker (analyst) and Morgan Uber (sideline)

Game information

First quarter

- (5:18) USF – Nico Gramatica 28-yard field goal (Drive: 8 plays, 31 yards, 2:03; South Florida 3–0)
- (0:42) ODU – Quinn Henicle 6-yard run, Nathanial Eichner kick (Drive: 10 plays, 75 yards, 4:36; Old Dominion 7–3)

Second quarter

- (7:24) USF – Jeremiah Kroger 31-yard pass from Gaston Moore, Nico Gramatica kick (Drive: 3 plays, 55 yards, 1:03; South Florida 10–7)

Third quarter

- (10:06) ODU – Trequan Jones 22-yard run, Nathanial Eichner kick (Drive: 3 plays, 25 yards, 0:38; Old Dominion 14–10)
- (3:27) ODU – Nathanial Eichner 24-yard field goal (Drive: 10 plays, 73 yards, 4:13; Old Dominion 17–10)

Fourth quarter

- (2:24) ODU – Quinn Henicle 51-yard run, Nathanial Eichner kick (Drive: 4 plays, 57 yards, 1:15; Old Dominion 24–10)

Statistics	ODU	USF
First downs	21	19
Plays–yards	81–382	76–333
Rushes–yards	55–255	35–52
Passing yards	127	281
Passing: Comp–Att–Int	11–26–0	27–41–4
Turnovers	1	5
Time of possession	31:07	28:53

Team	Category	Player	Statistics
Old Dominion	Passing	Quinn Henicle	11/25, 127 yards
Old Dominion	Rushing	Quinn Henicle	24 carries, 107 yards, 2 TD
Old Dominion	Receiving	Na'eem Abdur-Raheem Gladding	5 receptions, 60 yards
South Florida	Passing	Gaston Moore	20/28, 236 yards, TD, 2 INT
South Florida	Rushing	Alvon Isaac	7 carries, 41 yards
South Florida	Receiving	Christian Neptune	10 receptions, 102 yards
