= Rara Thomas =

American football player (born 2002)

RaRa Thomas
Profile
- Position: Wide receiver

Personal information
- Born: July 28, 2002 (age 24); Eufaula, Alabama, U.S.
- Listed height: 6 ft 0 in (1.83 m)
- Listed weight: 205 lb (93 kg)

Career information
- High school: Eufaula
- College: Mississippi State (2021–2022); Georgia (2023); Troy (2025)
- Stats at ESPN

Rodarius Jaiquan Thomas (born July 28, 2002) is an American football wide receiver. He previously played for the Mississippi State Bulldogs, Georgia Bulldogs, and for the Troy Trojans.

== Early life ==
Thomas attended Eufaula High School in Eufaula, Alabama. As a senior, he had 55 receptions for 945 yards and 13 touchdowns. He committed to Mississippi State University as a three star prospect to play college football.v

== College career ==
=== Mississippi State ===
As a true freshman at Mississippi State in 2021, Thomas played in 10 games with three starts and had 18 receptions for 252 yards and five touchdowns. He returned to Mississippi State as a starter in 2022. Following the 2022 season Thomas entered the transfer portal and signed with Georgia.

=== Georgia ===
On December 22, 2022, Thomas transferred to Georgia for his junior season. Thomas played in 11 games and had 23 receptions for 383 yards and one touchdown.

On August 1st, 2024, Thomas was dismissed from the program due to charges of felony false imprisonment and a misdemeanor count of family violence battery.

=== Troy ===
On March 26, 2025, Thomas transferred to Troy University after accepting a plea deal in his family violence case.

=== College statistics ===
Year	Team	GP	Receiving			
Year	Team	GP	Rec	Yds	Avg	TD
2021	Mississippi State	10	18	252	14.0	5
2022	Mississippi State	12	44	626	14.2	7
2023	Georgia	11	23	383	16.7	1
Career		33	85	1,261	14.8	13

== Professional career ==
Pre-draft measurables
Height	Weight	Arm length	Hand span	Wingspan	40-yard dash	10-yard split	20-yard split	20-yard shuttle	Three-cone drill	Vertical jump	Broad jump
5 ft 11 7/8 in (1.83 m)	205 lb (93 kg)	32 1/2 in (0.83 m)	9 7/8 in (0.25 m)	6 ft 6 1/2 in (1.99 m)	4.63 s	1.50 s	2.62 s	4.52 s	7.28 s	34.0 in (0.86 m)	10 ft 2 in (3.10 m)
All values from Pro Day

== Arrests ==
On January 23, 2023, Thomas was arrested by University of Georgia police on two charges including one felony. He was charged with felony false imprisonment and misdemeanor battery family violence 1st offense, according to the Clarke County Jail online booking report.

On July 26, 2024, Thomas was arrested again by Athens-Clark County police on two counts of battery, both misdemeanors, and one count of second-degree cruelty to children, a felony. On March 19, 2025, Thomas accepted an Alford plea, reducing the charges to one count of misdemeanor disorderly conduct.
