= 2025 Sun Belt Conference Football Championship Game =

2025 Credit Union 1 Sun Belt Conference Football Championship Game
- 7th SBC Championship Game
Troy Trojans	James Madison Dukes
(8–4)	(11–1)
14	31
Head coach: Gerad Parker	Head coach: Bob Chesney
	AP / Coaches / CFP; 19 / 19 / 25
	1	2	3	4	Total
Troy	0	14	0	0	14
James Madison	3	14	0	14	31
- Date: December 5, 2025
- Season: 2025
- Stadium: Bridgeforth Stadium
- Location: Harrisonburg, Virginia
- Favorite: James Madison by 23.5
- Referee: Tim Barker
- Attendance: 19,836

United States TV coverage
- Network: ESPN
- Announcers: Anish Shroff (play-by-play), Andre Ware (analyst), and Paul Carcaterra (sideline reporter)

2025 Sun Belt Conference football standings
	Conf.			Overall
Team	W		L	W		L
East Division
No. 25 James Madison xy$	8	–	0	12	–	1
Old Dominion	6	–	2	9	–	3
Coastal Carolina	5	–	3	6	–	6
Georgia Southern	4	–	4	6	–	6
Marshall	3	–	5	5	–	7
Appalachian State	2	–	6	5	–	7
Georgia State	0	–	8	1	–	11
West Division
Troy xy	6	–	2	8	–	5
Southern Miss	5	–	3	7	–	5
Louisiana	5	–	3	6	–	6
Arkansas State	5	–	3	6	–	6
Texas State	3	–	5	6	–	6
South Alabama	3	–	5	4	–	8
Louisiana–Monroe	1	–	7	3	–	9
Championship: James Madison 31, Troy 14
$ – Conference champion; x – Division champion/co-champions; y – Championship game participant; As of December 6, 2025; Rankings from CFP Rankings

The 2025 Sun Belt Conference Football Championship Game was a college football game played on December 5, 2025, to determine the champion of the Sun Belt Conference for the 2025 season. It was the seventh edition of the Sun Belt Conference Football Championship Game. The game was played at 7:00 p.m. EST on ESPN. The game featured the James Madison Dukes, the East Division champions, against Troy Trojans, the West Division champions. Sponsored by Credit Union 1 and Visit Pensacola, the game was officially named the 2025 Credit Union 1 Sun Belt Football Championship presented by Visit Pensacola.

== Teams ==
=== James Madison Dukes ===
James Madison clinched the East Division on November 15, 2025, after they beat Appalachian State and Coastal Carolina lost to Georgia Southern.

=== Troy Trojans ===
Troy clinched the West Division on November 29, 2025, after they beat Southern Miss.
