= Tae Meadows =

American football player (born 2004)

No. 21 – Auburn Tigers
- Position: Running back
- Class: Graduate

Personal information
- Born: May 27, 2004 (age 22); Roanoke, Alabama, U.S.
- Listed height: 5 ft 10 in (1.78 m)
- Listed weight: 200 lb (91 kg)

Career information
- High school: Handley (Roanoke, Alabama)
- College: Troy (2023–2025); Auburn (2026–present)
- Stats at ESPN

Tae Meadows (born May 27, 2004) is an American college football running back for the Auburn Tigers. He previously played for the Troy Trojans.

== Early life ==
Meadows played for Handley High School in Roanoke, Alabama. In his junior year, he rushed for over 2,000 yards, including 264 yards in the state championship. He received offers from nine schools following the season, not including Tennessee, who offered prior to the state championship.

== College career ==
=== Troy ===
Meadows signed with Troy as a walk-on in February 2022. He carried the ball once in 2023, for a five-yard touchdown. He finished the 2024 season with three carries for 41 yards.

In April 2025, Meadows was placed on a scholarship with Troy. Later that season, he rushed for a game-winning 20-yard touchdown against the Buffalo Bulls. He finished the season with 695 yards and six touchdowns across 159 carries. After appearing in the 2025 conference championship, Meadows chose to enter the NCAA transfer portal in December 2025.

=== Auburn ===
Meadows committed to Auburn on January 22, 2026.

== Personal life ==
Meadows was born in Roanoke, Alabama.
