= 2025 James Madison Dukes football team =

American college football season

2025 James Madison Dukes football

Sun Belt champion Sun Belt East Division champion

Sun Belt Championship, W 31–14 vs. Troy

CFP First Round, L 34–51 at Oregon
- Conference: Sun Belt Conference
- East Division

Ranking
- Coaches: No. 20
- AP: No. 19
- Record: 12–2 (8–0 Sun Belt)
- Head coach: Bob Chesney (2nd season)
- Offensive coordinator: Dean Kennedy (2nd season)
- Offensive scheme: Spread
- Defensive coordinator: Colin Hitschler (1st season)
- Base defense: 4–2–5
- Home stadium: Bridgeforth Stadium

2025 Sun Belt Conference football standings
	Conf.			Overall
Team	W		L	W		L
East Division
No. 19 James Madison xy$^	8	–	0	12	–	2
Old Dominion	6	–	2	10	–	3
Coastal Carolina	5	–	3	6	–	7
Georgia Southern	4	–	4	7	–	6
Marshall	3	–	5	5	–	7
Appalachian State	2	–	6	5	–	8
Georgia State	0	–	8	1	–	11
West Division
Troy xy	6	–	2	8	–	6
Southern Miss	5	–	3	7	–	6
Louisiana	5	–	3	6	–	7
Arkansas State	5	–	3	7	–	6
Texas State	3	–	5	7	–	6
South Alabama	3	–	5	4	–	8
Louisiana–Monroe	1	–	7	3	–	9
Championship: James Madison 31, Troy 14
^ – College Football Playoff participant; $ – Conference champion; x – Division champion/co-champions; y – Championship game participant; Rankings from AP Poll

The 2025 James Madison Dukes football team represented James Madison University in the Sun Belt Conference's East Division during the 2025 NCAA Division I FBS football season. The Dukes were led by Bob Chesney in his second year as the head coach. The Dukes played their home games at the Bridgeforth Stadium, located in Harrisonburg, Virginia. They appeared in the College Football Playoff for the first time in program and Sun Belt history.

James Madison became the first ever program to participate in both the College Football Playoff and the FCS playoffs in the same decade (2020s), the last appearance of the latter being in 2021, which was their final season in the FCS.

== Offseason ==
=== Transfers ===
==== Outgoing ====
Player	Position	Destination
Jamari Somerville	DB	Akron
Evan Spivey	S	Campbell
Carter Banks	EDGE	Central Connecticut
Brett Griffis	QB	Central Connecticut
Ke'Marion Baldwin	RB	Charleston Southern
Kyle Lenhart	IOL	Cornell
Chris Lofton	WR	Gardner–Webb
Max Moss	WR	Hampton
Marcellus Nash	DL	Hampton
Jack Mowrey	LS	Hawaii
Trevell Mullen	CB	Illinois State
Cameron Jones	OT	Kentucky
Lexington Matthews	P	Louisiana Tech
Chauncey Logan Jr.	CB	Memphis
Jesse Ramil	OL	Mississippi State
Antoine Booth	CB	North Dakota State
Tyjai Hopper	CB	Oregon State
Jeremiah Mawali	DL	Prairie View A&M
Darold DeNgohe	DL	Rutgers
Eric O'Neill	DE	Rutgers
Yamir Knight	WR	SMU
Billy Atkins	QB	South Carolina State
Breon Brown	OT	Tennessee State
Treyvon Adams	DL	Towson
Noe Ruelas	K	UCF
RoyMarr Thomas	EDGE	Valdosta State
Tyshawn Wyatt	OL	Virginia
Cam Ross	WR	Virginia
Micah Pennix	DL	Virginia Union
Quincy Jenkins	IOL	Western Kentucky
Erick Harris	WR	Unknown
Desmond Green	WR	Unknown
Hunter McLain	IOL	Unknown
Samson Ogunade	DL	Unknown
Andrew VanSlyke	P	Withdrawn

==== Incoming ====
Player	Position	Previous school
Elijah Culp	CB	Charlotte
Lacota Dippre	DE	Charlotte
Ken Willis	CB	Cincinnati
Andrew Taddeo	DL	Colgate
James Pogorelc	OT	Duke
Josiah Kennard	LS	East Texas A&M
Morgan Suarez	K	Florida Atlantic
Jordan Fuller	RB	Holy Cross
Curtis Harris-Lopez	S	Holy Cross
Cam McNair	OT	Holy Cross
Isaiah Alston	WR	Iowa State
Nunu Concepcion	WR	Kansas State
Jayden Studio	LB	Kent State
Kells Bush	DL	Louisiana Tech
Patrick Rea	P	Louisiana Tech
Xavier Holmes	DL	Maine
Chantz Harley	DB	Maryland
Braeden Wisloski	WR	Maryland
Zach Greenberg	OL	North Carolina
Aiden Gobaira	DE	Notre Dame
Camden Coleman	QB	Richmond
Landon Ellis	WR	Richmond
Nick DeGennaro	WR	Richmond
Turner Schmidt	EDGE	Robert Morris
Mekhi Rodgers	DB	Saint Francis (PA)
Lexington Matthews	P	Savannah State
JT Kouame-Yao	LB	Shepherd
Jamir Conn	DB	Southern Illinois
Chase Miller	WR	Stonehill
Za'Ron Collins	WR	Tusculum
Matthew Sluka	QB	UNLV
Abdur-Rahmaan Yaseen	WR	USF
Jeremiah Mawali	OL	Valdosta State
Jaylan Sanchez	WR	Villanova
TJ McGill	S	William & Mary

== Preseason ==
=== Media poll ===
In the Sun Belt preseason coaches' poll, the Dukes were picked to finish first place in the East division.

Running back George Pettaway, offensive lineman Pat McMurtrie and defensive back Jacob Thomas were awarded to be in the preseason All-Sun Belt first team offense and defense, respectively. Quarterback Alonza Barnett III, defensive lineman Immanuel Bush, linebacker Trent Hendrick, defensive back DJ Barksdale and associated press player George Pettaway were named to the second team.

== Schedule ==
Date	Time	Opponent	Rank	Site	TV	Result	Attendance
August 30	6:00 p.m.	Weber State*		Bridgeforth Stadium; Harrisonburg, VA	ESPN+	W 45–10	24,965
September 5	7:30 p.m.	at Louisville*		L&N Federal Credit Union Stadium; Louisville, KY	ESPN2	L 14–28	48,717
September 20	3:30 p.m.	at Liberty*		Williams Stadium; Lynchburg, VA (Battle of the Blue Ridge)	ESPNU	W 31–13	24,022
September 27	1:30 p.m.	Georgia Southern		Bridgeforth Stadium; Harrisonburg, VA	ESPN+	W 35–10	25,029
October 4	3:30 p.m.	at Georgia State		Center Parc Stadium; Atlanta, GA	ESPN+	W 14–7	19,256
October 11	12:00 p.m.	Louisiana		Bridgeforth Stadium; Harrisonburg, VA	ESPN2	W 24–14	25,128
October 18	3:30 p.m.	Old Dominion^{†}		Bridgeforth Stadium; Harrisonburg, VA (Royal Rivalry)	ESPNU	W 63–27	25,232
October 28	8:00 p.m.	at Texas State		UFCU Stadium; San Marcos, TX	ESPN2	W 52–20	17,363
November 8	12:00 p.m.	at Marshall		Joan C. Edwards Stadium; Huntington, WV	ESPN2	W 35–23	26,727
November 15	3:30 p.m.	Appalachian State		Bridgeforth Stadium; Harrisonburg, VA	ESPN+	W 58–10	25,298
November 22	1:00 p.m.	Washington State*		Bridgeforth Stadium; Harrisonburg, VA	ESPN+	W 24–20	25,156
November 29	3:45 p.m.	at Coastal Carolina		Brooks Stadium; Conway, SC	ESPNU	W 59–10	15,137
December 5	7:00 p.m.	Troy	No. 25	Bridgeforth Stadium; Harrisonburg, VA (Sun Belt Championship Game)	ESPN	W 31–14	19,836
December 20	7:30 p.m.	at (5) No. 5 Oregon*	(12) No. 24	Autzen Stadium; Eugene, OR (CFP First Round)	TNT/HBO Max	L 34–51	55,124
*Non-conference game; ^{†}Homecoming; Rankings from AP Poll (and CFP Rankings, after November 4) - released prior to game; All times are in Eastern time

== Rankings ==
Ranking movements Legend: ██ Increase in ranking ██ Decrease in ranking — = Not ranked RV = Received votes
	Week																
Poll	Pre	1	2	3	4	5	6	7	8	9	10	11	12	13	14	15	Final
AP	RV	RV	—	—	—	—	—	—	RV	RV	RV	24	21	20	19	19	19
Coaches	—	—	—	—	—	—	—	—	RV	RV	RV	25	22	21	19	19	20
CFP	Not released										—	—	—	—	25	24	Not released

== Game summaries ==
=== Weber State (FCS) ===
Weber State Wildcats (FCS) (0–0) at James Madison Dukes (0–0) – Game summary

Quarter	1	2	3	4	Total
Wildcats (FCS)	0	7	3	0	10
Dukes	14	14	3	14	45

at Bridgeforth Stadium • Harrisonburg, VA

- Date: August 30
- Game time: 6:00 PM EDT
- Game weather: Sunny • Temperature: 72 °F (22 °C) • Wind: E at 3 miles per hour (4.8 km/h)
- Game attendance: 24,965
- Referee: Tim Barker
- TV announcers (ESPN+): Curt Dudley (play-by-play), Delvin Joyce (analyst), and David Hulvey (sideline reporter)

Game information

First quarter

- JMU – Alonza Barnett III 11-yard run (Morgan Suarez kick), 8:25. Dukes 7–0. Drive: 10 plays, 78 yards, 4:46.
- JMU – Isaiah Alston 20-yard pass from Alonza Barnett III (Morgan Suarez kick), 0:46. Dukes 14–0. Drive: 10 plays, 59 yards, 5:16.

Second quarter

- JMU – Matthew Sluka 1-yard run (Morgan Suarez kick), 7:12. Dukes 21–0. Drive: 10 plays, 57 yards, 4:34.
- JMU – Landon Ellis 14-yard pass from Matthew Sluka (Morgan Suarez kick), 3:36. Dukes 28–0. Drive: 3 plays, 31 yards, 0:39.
- WEB – Noah Kjar 14-yard pass from Jackson Gilkey (Sloan Calder kick), 0:53. Dukes 28–7. Drive: 2 plays, 21 yards 0:44.

Third quarter

- WEB – Sloan Calder 51-yard field goal, 11:03. Dukes 28–10. Drive: 4 plays, 4 yards, 1:00.
- JMU – Morgan Suarez 38-yard field goal, 7:21. Dukes 31–10. Drive: 8 plays, 56 yards, 3:42.

Fourth quarter

- JMU – Wayne Knight 59-yard run (Morgan Suarez kick), 14:51. Dukes 38–10. Drive: 3 plays, 67 yards, 1:02.
- JMU – JC Evans 5-yard run (Morgan Suarez kick), 4:48. Dukes 45–10. Drive: 1 play, 5 yards, 0:06.

Statistics	WEB	JMU
First downs	10	23
Plays–yards	57–148	71–458
Rushes–yards	31–64	44–313
Passing yards	84	145
Passing: Comp–Att–Int	10–26–3	17–27–1
Turnovers	3	2
Time of possession	27:33	32:27

Team	Category	Player	Statistics
Weber State	Passing	Jackson Gilkey	10/24, 84 yards, TD, 3 INT
Weber State	Rushing	Zach Hrbacek	12 carries, 39 yards
Weber State	Receiving	Marcus Chretien	2 receptions, 22 yards
James Madison	Passing	Alonza Barnett III	14/22, 130 yards, TD
James Madison	Rushing	George Pettaway	10 carries, 99 yards
James Madison	Receiving	Michael Scott	4 receptions, 38 yards

=== at Louisville ===
James Madison Dukes (1–0) at Louisville Cardinals (1–0) – Game summary

Quarter	1	2	3	4	Total
Dukes	7	0	7	0	14
Cardinals	0	6	8	14	28

at L&N Federal Credit Union Stadium • Louisville, KY

- Date: September 5, 2025
- Game time: 7:30 PM EDT
- Game weather: Sunny • Temperature: 79 °F (26 °C) • Wind: NW at 10 miles per hour (16 km/h)
- Game attendance: 48,717
- Referee: Mike Roche
- TV announcers (ESPN2): Anish Shroff (play-by-play), Andre Ware (analyst) and Paul Carcaterra (sideline reporter)

Game information

First quarter

- (4:01) JMU – Lacota Dippre 3-yard pass from Alonza Barnett (Morgan Suarez kick) (Drive: 11 plays, 39 yards, 5:35; James Madison 7–0)

Second quarter

- (5:21) LOU – Cooper Ranvier 22-yard field goal (Drive: 13 plays, 56 yards, 5:58; James Madison 7–3)
- (0:09) LOU – Cooper Ranvier 38-yard field goal (Drive: 7 plays, 17 yards, 1:33; James Madison 7–6)

Third quarter

- (10:10) JMU – Matthew Sluka 8-yard run (Morgan Suarez kick) (Drive: 9 plays, 75 yards, 4:50; James Madison 14–6)
- (8:37) LOU – Chris Bell 64-yard pass from Miller Moss (Miller Moss run) (Drive: 4 plays, 75 yards, 1:33; Tied 14–14)

Fourth quarter

- (13:05) LOU – AJ Green 0-yard fumble recovery (Cooper Ranvier PAT failed) (Louisville 20–14)
- (3:31) LOU – Isaac Brown 78-yard run (Dacari Collins pass from Miller Moss) (Drive: 2 plays, 81 yards, 0:54; Louisville 28–14)

Statistics	JMU	LOU
First downs	19	12
Plays–yards	78–263	53–264
Rushes–yards	47–126	30–113
Passing yards	137	151
Passing: comp–att–int	18–31–1	13–23–0
Turnovers	2	1
Time of possession	37:18	22:42

Team	Category	Player	Statistics
James Madison	Passing	Alonza Barrett III	15/25, 102 yards, TD
James Madison	Rushing	Matthew Sluka	21 carries, 83 yards, TD
James Madison	Receiving	Landon Ellis	3 receptions, 55 yards
Louisville	Passing	Miller Moss	13/23, 151 yards, TD
Louisville	Rushing	Isaac Brown	12 carries, 104 yards, TD
Louisville	Receiving	Chris Bell	4 receptions, 83 yards, TD

=== at Liberty ===
James Madison Dukes (1–1) at Liberty Flames (1–2) – Game summary

Quarter	1	2	3	4	Total
Dukes	3	7	7	14	31
Flames	3	7	3	0	13

at Williams Stadium • Lynchburg, VA

- Date: September 20
- Game time: 6:00 PM EDT
- Game weather: Sunny • Temperature: 85 °F (29 °C) • Wind: E 6 mph
- Game attendance: 24,022
- Referee: Steven Robinson
- TV announcers (ESPNU): Courtney Lyle (play-by-play) and Rene Ingoglia (analyst)

Game information

First quarter

- (9:42) JMU – Morgan Suarez 39-yard field goal (Drive: 12 plays, 54 yards, 5:18; James Madison 3–0)
- (4:55) LIB – Jay Billingsley 47-yard field goal (Drive: 11 plays, 46 yards, 4:47; Tied 3–3)

Second quarter

- (5:34) LIB – Ethan Vasko 2-yard run, Jay Billingsley kick (Drive: 10 plays, 74 yards, 4:34; Liberty 10–3)
- (1:19) JMU – Landon Ellis 21-yard pass from Alonza Barnett III, Morgan Suarez kick (Drive: 8 plays, 77 yards, 4:07; Tied 10–10)

Third quarter

- (8:06) LIB – Jay Billingsley 35-yard field goal (Drive: 13 plays, 59 yards, 6:54; Liberty 13–10)
- (3:32) JMU – Wayne Knight 1-yard run, Morgan Suarez kick (Drive: 9 plays, 81 yards, 4:27; James Madison 17–13)

Fourth quarter

- (11:07) JMU – Alonza Barnett III 9-yard run, Morgan Suarez kick (Drive: 11 plays, 67 yards, 5:52; James Madison 24–13)
- (2:31) JMU – Alonza Barnett III 13-yard run, Morgan Suarez kick (Drive: 8 plays, 68 yards, 4:05; James Madison 31–13)

Statistics	JMU	LIB
First downs	24	16
Plays–yards	67–440	63–233
Rushes–yards	42–227	42–158
Passing yards	213	75
Passing: Comp–Att–Int	17–25–1	7–21–0
Turnovers	1	0
Time of possession	33:03	26:57

Team	Category	Player	Statistics
James Madison	Passing	Alonza Barnett III	17/25, 213 yards, TD, INT
James Madison	Rushing	Wayne Knight	17 carries, 89 yards, TD
James Madison	Receiving	Jaylan Sanchez	4 receptions, 51 yards
Liberty	Passing	Ethan Vasko	4/10, 37 yards
Liberty	Rushing	Evan Dickens	17 carries, 67 yards
Liberty	Receiving	Jamari Person	2 receptions, 29 yards

=== Georgia Southern ===
Georgia Southern Eagles (2–2) at James Madison Dukes (2–1) – Game summary

Quarter	1	2	3	4	Total
Eagles	0	3	7	0	10
Dukes	7	14	14	0	35

at Bridgeforth Stadium • Harrisonburg, VA

- Date: September 27, 2025
- Game time: 1:30 p.m. EDT
- Game weather: Rain • Temperature: 70 °F (21 °C) • Wind: 5 mph
- Game attendance: 25,029
- Referee: Jeremy Parker
- TV announcers (ESPN+): Curt Dudley (play-by-play), Delvin Joyce (analyst) and David Hulvey (sideline reporter)

Game information

First quarter

- (7:23) JMU – Wayne Knight 40-yard run, Morgan Suarez kick (Drive: 5 plays, 72 yards, 2:19; James Madison 7–0)

Second quarter

- (9:15) JMU – Alonza Barnett III 4-yard run, Morgan Suarez kick (Drive: 9 plays, 57 yards, 4:08; James Madison 14–0)
- (4:15) GASO – Tripp Bryant 26-yard field goal (Drive: 11 plays, 68 yards, 5:00; James Madison 14–3)
- (4:01) JMU – Curtis Harris-Lopez 88-yard kickoff return, Morgan Suarez kick (Drive: 11 plays, 68 yards, 5:00; James Madison 21–3)

Third quarter

- (8:59) JMU – Lacota Dippre 17-yard pass from Alonza Barnett III, Morgan Suarez kick (Drive: 10 plays, 67 yards, 5:51; James Madison 28–3)
- (1:57) JMU – Jordan Fuller 26-yard run, Morgan Suarez kick (Drive: 8 plays, 80 yards, 4:24; James Madison 35–3)
- (0:40) GASO – Taylor Bradshaw 12-yard pass from JC French IV, Tripp Bryant kick (Drive: 3 plays, 75 yards, 1:17; James Madison 35–10)

Fourth quarter

- No scoring plays.

Statistics	GASO	JMU
First downs	10	29
Plays–yards	50–192	75–479
Rushes–yards	26–27	53–331
Passing yards	165	148
Passing: Comp–Att–Int	14–24–0	11–22–0
Turnovers	0	0
Time of possession	24:10	35:50

Team	Category	Player	Statistics
Georgia Southern	Passing	J.C. French IV	14/24, 165 yards, TD
Georgia Southern	Rushing	David Mbadinga	3 carries, 14 yards
Georgia Southern	Receiving	Camden Brown	5 receptions, 111 yards
James Madison	Passing	Alonza Barnett III	11/22, 148 yards, TD
James Madison	Rushing	Wayne Knight	19 carries, 151 yards, TD
James Madison	Receiving	Lacota Dippre	2 receptions, 42 yards, TD

=== at Georgia State ===
James Madison Dukes (3–1) at Georgia State Panthers (1–3) – Game summary

Quarter	1	2	3	4	Total
Dukes	0	0	7	7	14
Panthers	7	0	0	0	7

at Center Parc Stadium • Atlanta, GA

- Date: October 4, 2025
- Game time: 3:30 p.m. EDT
- Game weather: Sunny • Temperature: 75 °F (24 °C)
- Game attendance: 19,256
- Referee: Tim Barker
- TV announcers (ESPN+): Matt Stewart (play-by-play) and Sam Crenshaw (analyst)

Game information

First quarter

- (4:03) GAST – Camden Overton-Howard 19-yard pass from TJ Finley, Braeden McAlister kick (Drive: 6 plays, 71 yards, 3:24; Georgia State 7–0)

Second quarter

- No scoring plays.

Third quarter

- (6:50) JMU – Alonza Barnett III 1-yard run, Morgan Suarez kick (Drive: 8 plays, 85 yards, 3:27; Tied 7–7)

Fourth quarter

- (9:50) JMU – Wayne Knight 9-yard run, Morgan Suarez kick (Drive: 4 plays, 28 yards, 1:43; James Madison 14–7)

Statistics	JMU	GAST
First downs	19	14
Plays–yards	65–285	54–249
Rushes–yards	43–211	22–37
Passing yards	74	212
Passing: Comp–Att–Int	11–22–0	22–32–0
Turnovers	0	0
Time of possession	31:53	28:07

Team	Category	Player	Statistics
James Madison	Passing	Alonza Barnett III	11/22, 74 yards
James Madison	Rushing	Jordan Fuller	18 carries, 94 yards
James Madison	Receiving	Landon Ellis	3 receptions, 28 yards
Georgia State	Passing	TJ Finley	19/28, 198 yards, TD
Georgia State	Rushing	Rashad Amos	11 carries, 30 yards
Georgia State	Receiving	Camden Overton-Howard	7 receptions, 65 yards, TD

=== Louisiana ===
Louisiana Ragin' Cajuns (2–3) at James Madison Dukes (4–2) – Game summary

Quarter	1	2	3	4	Total
Ragin' Cajuns	0	14	0	0	14
Dukes	0	7	7	10	24

at Bridgeforth Stadium • Harrisonburg, VA

- Date: October 11, 2025
- Game time: 12:00 PM EDT
- Game weather: Sunny
- Referee: Trennis Livingston
- TV announcers (ESPN2): Lowell Galindo (play-by-play), Aaron Murray (analyst) and Lauren Sisler (sideline reporter)

Game information

First quarter

- No scoring plays.

Second quarter

- (8:33) LA – Brock Chappell 5-yard pass from Lunch Winfield, Tony Sterner kick (Drive: 6 plays, 80 yards, 4:02; Louisiana 7–0)
- (4:47) JMU – Landon Ellis 4-yard pass from Alonza Barnett III, Morgan Suarez kick (Drive: 5 plays, 60 yards, 2:01; Tied 7–7)
- (3:16) LA – Dale Martin 69-yard pass from Lunch Winfield, Tony Sterner kick (Drive: 3 plays, 75 yards, 1:31; Louisiana 14–7)

Third quarter

- (14:46) JMU – Landon Ellis 62-yard pass from Alonza Barnett III, Morgan Suarez kick (Drive: 1 play, 62 yards, 0:09; Tied 14–14)

Fourth quarter

- (12:33) JMU – Landon Ellis 4-yard pass from Alonza Barnett III, Morgan Suarez kick (Drive: 6 plays, 25 yards, 2:31; James Madison 21–14)
- (3:05) JMU – Morgan Suarez 24-yard field goal (Drive: 7 plays, 51 yards, 3:03; James Madison 24–14)

Statistics	LA	JMU
First downs	11	21
Plays–yards	57–288	81–477
Rushes–yards	28–45	41–187
Passing yards	243	290
Passing: Comp–Att–Int	14–29–1	26–40–1
Turnovers	1	3
Time of possession	23:09	36:51

Team	Category	Player	Statistics
Louisiana	Passing	Lunch Winfield	14/28, 243 yards, 2 TD, INT
Louisiana	Rushing	Lunch Winfield	15 carries, 23 yards
Louisiana	Receiving	Robert Williams	5 receptions, 134 yards
James Madison	Passing	Alonza Barnett III	26/40, 290 yards, 3 TD, INT
James Madison	Rushing	Wayne Knight	20 carries, 111 yards
James Madison	Receiving	Landon Ellis	6 receptions, 120 yards, 3 TD

=== Old Dominion (Royal Rivalry) ===
Old Dominion Monarchs (4–2) at James Madison Dukes (5–1) – Game summary

Quarter	1	2	3	4	Total
Monarchs	20	7	0	0	27
Dukes	14	14	21	14	63

at Bridgeforth Stadium • Harrisonburg, VA

- Date: October 18, 2025
- Game time: 3:30 p.m. EDT
- Game weather: Sunny • Temperature: 75 °F (24 °C) • Wind: 5 mph
- Game attendance: 25,232
- Referee: Marshall Lewis
- TV announcers (ESPNU): Jay Alter (play-by-play) and Rocky Boiman (analyst)

Game information

First quarter

- (14:54) ODU – Lucas Struck 2-yard fumble return, Riley Callaghan (Drive: 5 plays, 78 yards, 2:25; Old Dominion 7–0)
- (12:23) JMU – Alonza Barnett III 58-yard run, Morgan Suarez kick (Drive: 5 plays, 78 yards, 2:25; Tied 7–7)
- (3:56) ODU – Tre' Brown III 98-yard pass from Colton Joseph, Riley Callaghan kick (Drive: 1 play, 98 yards, 0:14; Old Dominion 14–7)
- (3:05) JMU – Nick DeGennaro 65-yard pass from Alonza Barnett III, Morgan Suarez kick (Drive: 2 plays, 75 yards, 0:51; Tied 14–14)
- (0:19) ODU – Tre' Brown III 11-yard pass from Colton Joseph, Riley Callaghan PAT failed (Drive: 8 plays, 75 yards, 2:46; Old Dominion 20–14)

Second quarter

- (12:00) JMU – Nick DeGennaro 7-yard pass from Alonza Barnett III, Morgan Suarez kick (Drive: 7 plays, 75 yards, 3:19; James Madison 21–20)
- (6:49) ODU – Dawson Johnson 16-yard pass from Colton Joseph, Riley Callaghan kick (Drive: 11 plays, 75 yards, 5:11; Old Dominion 27–21)
- (1:57) JMU – Jordan Fuller 2-yard run, Morgan Suarez kick (Drive: 9 plays, 75 yards, 4:52; James Madison 28–27)

Third quarter

- (10:49) JMU – Wayne Knight 13-yard run, Morgan Suarez kick (Drive: 8 plays, 57 yards, 4:04; James Madison 35–27)
- (3:57) JMU – Alonza Barnett III 6-yard run, Morgan Suarez kick (Drive: 5 plays, 26 yards, 2:48; James Madison 42–27)
- (0:30) JMU – Alonza Barnett III 3-yard run, Morgan Suarez kick (Drive: 4 plays, 43 yards, 2:20; James Madison 49–27)

Fourth quarter

- (12:28) JMU – Alonza Barnett III 8-yard run, Morgan Suarez kick (Drive: 5 plays, 45 yards, 2:08; James Madison 56–27)
- (2:57) JMU – Za'Ron Collins 18-yard pass from Matthew Sluka, Morgan Suarez kick (Drive: 9 plays, 52 yards, 5:32; James Madison 63–27)

Statistics	ODU	JMU
First downs	13	27
Plays–yards	50–285	79–624
Rushes–yards	29–76	53–311
Passing yards	209	313
Passing: Comp–Att–Int	13–21–2	18–26–09
Turnovers	3	1
Time of possession	18:34	41:26

Team	Category	Player	Statistics
Old Dominion	Passing	Colton Joseph	13/22, 209 yards, 3 TD, 2 INT
Old Dominion	Rushing	Devin Roche	7 carries, 34 yards
Old Dominion	Receiving	Tre' Brown III	4 receptions, 138 yards, 2 TD
James Madison	Passing	Alonza Barnett III	17/25, 295 yards, 2 TD
James Madison	Rushing	Alonza Barnett III	17 carries, 153 yards, 4 TD
James Madison	Receiving	Nick DeGennaro	3 receptions, 106 yards, 2 TD

=== at Texas State ===
James Madison Dukes (6–1) at Texas State Bobcats (3–4) – Game summary

Quarter	1	2	3	4	Total
Dukes	14	14	21	3	52
Bobcats	0	20	0	0	20

at UFCU Stadium • San Marcos, TX

- Date: October 28, 2025
- Game time: 7:00 p.m. CDT
- Game weather: Sunny • Temperature: 71 °F (22 °C) • Wind: 17 mph
- Game attendance: 17,363
- Referee: Yvette Matchette
- TV announcers (ESPN2): Jay Alter (play-by-play) and Rocky Boiman (analyst)

Game information

First quarter

- (7:49) JMU – Nick DeGennaro 6-yard pass from Alonza Barnett III, Morgan Suarez kick (Drive: 6 plays, 50 yards, 3:41; James Madison 7–0)
- (4:16) JMU – Jordan Fuller 8-yard run, Morgan Suarez kick (Drive: 2 plays, 65 yards, 0:49; James Madison 14–0)

Second quarter

- (14:34) TXST – Mavin Anderson 14-yard pass from Brad Jackson, Tyler Robles kick (Drive: 4 plays, 24 yards, 1:11; James Madison 14–7)
- (9:45) JMU – Jordan Fuller 3-yard run, Morgan Suarez kick (Drive: 9 plays, 75 yards, 4:49; James Madison 21–7)
- (6:00) TXST – Tyler Robles 35-yard field goal (Drive: 10 plays, 57 yards, 3:45; James Madison 21–10)
- (4:45) JMU – Josh Phifer 14-yard pass from Alonza Barnett III, Morgan Suarez kick (Drive: 3 plays, 75 yards, 1:15; James Madison 28–10)
- (1:37) TXST – Brad Jackson 3-yard run, Tyler Robles kick (Drive: 11 plays, 75 yards, 3:02; James Madison 28–17)
- (0:04) TXST – Tyler Robles 36-yard field goal (Drive: 7 plays, 55 yards, 0:41; James Madison 28–20)

Third quarter

- (14:13) JMU – Nick DeGennaro 76-yard pass from Alonza Barnett III, Morgan Suarez kick (Drive: 2 plays, 75 yards, 0:47; James Madison 35–20)
- (9:50) JMU – Logan Kyle 5-yard pass from Alonza Barnett III, Morgan Suarez kick (Drive: 6 plays, 25 yards, 3:02; James Madison 42–20)
- (6:43) JMU – Alonza Barnett III 2-yard run, Morgan Suarez kick (Drive: 6 plays, 35 yards, 2:28; James Madison 49–20)

Fourth quarter

- (13:27) JMU – Morgan Suarez 31-yard field goal (Drive: 10 plays, 41 yards, 6:44; James Madison 52–20)

Statistics	JMU	TXST
First downs	22	20
Plays–yards	60–511	75–352
Rushes–yards	41–247	40–122
Passing yards	264	230
Passing: Comp–Att–Int	12–19–1	18–35–3
Turnovers	1	3
Time of possession	32:30	27:30

Team	Category	Player	Statistics
James Madison	Passing	Alonza Barnett III	12/18, 264 yards, 4 TD, INT
James Madison	Rushing	Alonza Barnett III	10 carries, 98 yards, TD
James Madison	Receiving	Nick DeGennaro	3 receptions, 101 yards, TD
Texas State	Passing	Brad Jackson	18/32, 230 yards, TD, 3 INT
Texas State	Rushing	Brad Jackson	16 carries, 43 yards, TD
Texas State	Receiving	Mavin Anderson	5 receptions, 96 yards, TD

=== at Marshall ===
James Madison Dukes (7–1) at Marshall Thundering Herd (4–4) – Game summary

Quarter	1	2	3	4	Total
Dukes	7	14	7	7	35
Thundering Herd	0	12	8	3	23

at Joan C. Edwards Stadium • Huntington, WV

- Date: November 8, 2025
- Game time: 12:00 p.m. EST
- Game weather: Sunny
- Game attendance: 26,727
- Referee: Tim Barker
- TV announcers (ESPN2): Roy Philpott (play-by-play), Sam Acho (analyst) and Taylor Davis (sideline reporter)

Game information

First quarter

- (8:02) JMU – Braeden Wisloski 26-yard pass from Alonza Barnett, Morgan Suarez kick (Drive: 8 plays, 82 yards, 3:44; James Madison 7–0)

Second quarter

- (13:55) MRSH – Antwan Roberts 13-yard run, Lorcan Quinn kick failed (Drive: 9 plays, 53 yards, 3:52; James Madison 7–6)
- (8:38) JMU – Wayne Knight 6-yard run, Morgan Suarez kick (Drive: 10 plays, 75 yards, 5:17; James Madison 14–6)
- (4:45) MRSH – Lorcan Quinn 49-yard field goal (Drive: 6 plays, 38 yards, 2:02; James Madison 14–9)
- (0:28) JMU – Jordan Fuller 1-yard run, Morgan Suarez kick (Drive: 10 plays, 75 yards, 4:17; James Madison 21–9)
- (0:00) MRSH – Lorcan Quinn 52-yard field goal (Drive: 5 plays, 18 yards, 0:21; James Madison 21–12)

Third quarter

- (7:47) JMU – Jaylen Sanchez 80-yard pass from Alonza Barnett, Morgan Suarez kick (Drive: 1 play, 80 yards, 0:11; James Madison 28–12)
- (1:04) MRSH – Tracy Stephens 4-yard pass from Carlos Del Rio-Wilson, De'Andre Tamarez pass from Carlos Del Rio-Wilson (Drive: 14 plays, 75 yards, 6:43; James Madison 28–20)

Fourth quarter

- (10:15) MRSH – Lorcan Quinn 23-yard field goal (Drive: 7 plays, 38 yards, 3:13; James Madison 28–23)
- (2:16) JMU – Wayne Knight 49-yard pass from Alonza Barnett, Morgan Suarez kick (Drive: 3 plays, 56 yards, 0:58; James Madison 35–23)

Statistics	JMU	MRSH
First downs	20	25
Plays–yards	59–409	86–414
Rushes–yards	35–139	50–248
Passing yards	270	166
Passing: Comp–Att–Int	14–24–1	17–36–0
Turnovers	1	0
Time of possession	28:03	31:57

Team	Category	Player	Statistics
James Madison	Passing	Alonza Barnett III	14/24, 270 yards, 3 TD, INT
James Madison	Rushing	Wayne Knight	14 carries, 87 yards, TD
James Madison	Receiving	Jaylen Sanchez	3 receptions, 86 yards, TD
Marshall	Passing	Carlos Del Rio-Wilson	16/35, 154 yards, TD
Marshall	Rushing	Antwan Roberts	20 carries, 121 yards, TD
Marshall	Receiving	De'Andre Tamarez	3 receptions, 37 yards

=== Appalachian State ===
Appalachian State Mountaineers (4–5) at James Madison Dukes (8–1) – Game summary

Quarter	1	2	3	4	Total
Mountaineers	0	0	0	10	10
Dukes	7	20	10	21	58

at Bridgeforth Stadium • Harrisonburg, VA

- Date: November 15, 2025
- Game time: 3:30 p.m. EDT
- Game weather: Sunny • Temperature: 65 °F (18 °C) • Wind: 8 mph
- Game attendance: 25,298
- Referee: Ted Pitts
- TV announcers (ESPN+): Curt Dudley (play-by-play), Delvin Joyce (analyst) and David Hulvey (sideline reporter)

Game information

First quarter

- (6:54) JMU – Wayne Knight 1-yard run, Morgan Suarez kick (Drive: 4 plays, 46 yards, 1:58; James Madison 7–0)

Second quarter

- (10:25) JMU – Morgan Suarez 42-yard field goal (Drive: 13 plays, 61 yards, 6:54; James Madison 10–0)
- (7:39) JMU – Jobi Malary 1-yard run, Morgan Suarez kick (Drive: 6 plays, 62 yards, 2:22; James Madison 17–0)
- (1:26) JMU – Alonza Barnett III 1-yard run, Morgan Suarez kick (Drive: 10 plays, 70 yards, 3:58; James Madison 24–0)
- (0:00) JMU – Morgan Suarez 38-yard field goal (Drive: 9 plays, 53 yards, 1:04; James Madison 27–0)

Third quarter

- (12:50) JMU – Alonza Barnett III 7-yard run, Morgan Suarez kick (Drive: 4 plays, 24 yards, 1:36; James Madison 34–0)
- (4:06) JMU – Morgan Suarez 26-yard field goal (Drive: 14 plays, 78 yards, 7:46; James Madison 37–0)

Fourth quarter

- (13:20) JMU – Jobi Malary 1-yard run, Morgan Suarez kick (Drive: 8 plays, 55 yards, 4:01; James Madison 44–0)
- (10:48) APP – Dominic De Freitas 48-yard field goal (Drive: 9 plays, 42 yards, 2:26; James Madison 44–3)
- (7:53) JMU – Jobi Malary 9-yard run, Morgan Suarez kick (Drive: 4 plays, 75 yards, 2:55; James Madison 51–3)
- (4:45) JMU – Matthew Sluka 35-yard run, Morgan Suarez kick (Drive: 4 plays, 70 yards, 2:17; James Madison 58–3)
- (1:54) APP – Davion Dozier 19-yard pass from JJ Kohl, Dominic De Freitas kick (Drive: 8 plays, 76 yards, 2:45; James Madison 58–10)

Statistics	APP	JMU
First downs	10	32
Plays–yards	52–146	89–627
Rushes–yards	15–1	54–324
Passing yards	145	303
Passing: Comp–Att–Int	14–37–1	22–35–1
Turnovers	1	1
Time of possession	17:42	42:18

Team	Category	Player	Statistics
Appalachian State	Passing	J. J. Kohl	6/8, 81 yards, TD
Appalachian State	Rushing	Rashod Dubinion	10 carries, 25 yards
Appalachian State	Receiving	Dalton Stroman	3 receptions, 74 yards
James Madison	Passing	Alonza Barnett III	22/35, 303 yards, INT
James Madison	Rushing	Jobi Malary	8 carries, 105 yards, 3 TD
James Madison	Receiving	Jaylan Sanchez	2 receptions, 69 yards

=== Washington State ===
Washington State Cougars (5–5) vs. James Madison Dukes (9–1) – Game summary

Quarter	1	2	3	4	Total
Cougars	3	14	0	3	20
Dukes	3	7	7	7	24

at Bridgeforth Stadium • Harrisonburg, VA

- Date: November 22, 2025
- Game time: 1:00 p.m. EST
- Game weather: Cloudy • Temperature: 55 °F (13 °C) • Wind: 5 mph
- Game attendance: 25,156
- Referee: Jeremy Parker
- TV announcers (ESPN+): Curt Dudley (play-by-play), Brian Barlow (analyst) and David Hulvey (sideline reporter)

Game information

First quarter

- (8:06) WSU – Jack Stevens 29-yard field goal (Drive: 10 plays, 20 yards, 3:27; Washington State 3–0)
- (5:10) JMU – Morgan Suarez 45-yard field goal (Drive: 7 plays, 38 yards, 2:56; Tied 3–3)

Second quarter

- (13:27) JMU – Justin Eaglin 37-yard interception return, Morgan Suarez kick (Drive: 4 plays, 13 yards, 1:41; James Madison 10–3)
- (7:26) WSU – Tony Freeman 48-yard pass from Zevi Eckhaus, Jack Stevens kick (Drive: 2 plays, 50 yards, 0:45; Tied 10–10)
- (0:48) WSU – Zevi Eckhaus 4-yard rush, Jack Stevens kick (Drive: 11 plays, 67 yards, 4:54; Washington State 17–10)

Third quarter

- (2:15) JMU – Braeden Wisloski 68-yard pass from Alonza Barnett III, Morgan Suarez kick (Drive: 1 play, 68 yards, 0:11; Tied 17–17)

Fourth quarter

- (9:24) WSU – Jack Stevens 36-yard field goal (Drive: 13 plays, 46 yards, 7:44; Washington State 20–17)
- (6:24) JMU – Wayne Knight 58-yard run, Morgan Suarez kick (Drive: 6 plays, 86 yards, 2:54; James Madison 24–20)

Statistics	WSU	JMU
First downs	19	14
Plays–yards	68–301	50–319
Rushes–yards	37–130	32–175
Passing yards	171	144
Passing: comp–att–int	19-31-1	9-18-1
Turnovers	1	1
Time of possession	34:58	25:02

Team	Category	Player	Statistics
Washington State	Passing	Zevi Eckhaus	19/31, 171 yards, TD, INT
Washington State	Rushing	Kirby Vorhees	19 carries, 61 yards,
Washington State	Receiving	Tony Freeman	6 receptions, 81 yards, TD
James Madison	Passing	Alonza Barnett III	9/19, 144 yards, TD, INT
James Madison	Rushing	Wayne Knight	15 carries, 126 yards, TD
James Madison	Receiving	Braeden Wisloski	1 reception, 68 yards, TD

=== at Coastal Carolina ===
James Madison Dukes (10–1) at Coastal Carolina Chanticleers (6–5) – Game summary

Quarter	1	2	3	4	Total
Dukes	17	3	11	28	59
Chanticleers	0	10	0	0	10

at Brooks Stadium • Conway, SC

- Date: November 29, 2025
- Game time: 3:45 p.m.
- Game weather: Sunny • Temperature: 47 °F (8 °C) • Wind: 6 mph
- Game attendance: 15,137
- Referee: Steven Robinson
- TV announcers (ESPNU): Justin Kutcher (play-by-play) and Rene Ingoglia (analyst)

Game information

First quarter

- (10:36) JMU – Alonza Barnett III 3-yard run, Morgan Suarez kick (Drive: 6 plays, 50 yards, 2:59; James Madison 7–0)
- (5:56) JMU – Morgan Suarez 33-yard field goal (Drive: 7 plays, 44 yards, 3:27; James Madison 10–0)
- (0:31) JMU – Braeden Wisloski 39-yard pass from Alonza Barnett III, Morgan Suarez kick (Drive: 5 plays, 67 yards, 2:19; James Madison 17–0)

Second quarter

- (11:21) JMU – Morgan Suarez 47-yard field goal (Drive: 7 plays, 14 yards, 3:39; James Madison 20–0)
- (7:57) CCU – Kian Afrookhteh 34-yard field goal (Drive: 10 plays, 58 yards, 3:24; James Madison 20–3)
- (2:59) CCU – Bryson Graves 12-yard pass from Tad Hudson, Kian Afrookhteh kick (Drive: 5 plays, 60 yards, 1:37; James Madison 20–10)

Third quarter

- (10:15) JMU – Morgan Suarez 21-yard field goal (Drive: 8 plays, 36 yards, 4:36; James Madison 23–10)
- (5:17) JMU – Lacota Dippre 25-yard pass from Alonza Barnett III, Alonza Barnett III pass to Nick DeGennaro for two-point conversion (Drive: 7 plays, 57 yards, 3:00; James Madison 31–10)

Fourth quarter

- (14:55) JMU – Isaiah Alston 9-yard pass from Alonza Barnett III, Morgan Suarez kick (Drive: 7 plays, 75 yards, 3:17; James Madison 38–10)
- (10:40) JMU – Jobi Malary 73-yard run, Morgan Suarez kick (Drive: 2 plays, 78 yards, 0:50; James Madison 45–10)
- (9:25) JMU – KJ Flowe 34-yard interception return, Morgan Suarez kick (Drive: 3 plays, 5 yards, 1:15; James Madison 52–10)
- (4:02) JMU – Morgan Scott 32-yard pass from Matthew Sluka, Morgan Suarez kick (Drive: 6 plays, 37 yards, 4:12; James Madison 59–10)

Statistics	JMU	CCU
First downs	24	10
Plays–yards	70–525	22–170
Rushes–yards	48–286	62–(-5)
Passing yards	239	175
Passing: Comp–Att–Int	16–22–1	18–40–1
Turnovers	1	1
Time of possession	36:04	23:56

Team	Category	Player	Statistics
James Madison	Passing	Alonza Barnett III	15/21, 207 yards, 3 TD, INT
James Madison	Rushing	Jobi Malary	12 carries, 154 yards, TD
James Madison	Receiving	Braeden Wisloski	4 receptions, 64 yards, TD
Coastal Carolina	Passing	Tad Hudson	16/38, 148 yards, TD, INT
Coastal Carolina	Rushing	Ja'Vin Simpkins	6 carries, 5 yards
Coastal Carolina	Receiving	Karmello English	2 receptions, 46 yards

=== Troy (Sun Belt Championship) ===
2025 Sun Belt Conference Championship Game
Troy Trojans (8–4) at James Madison Dukes (11–1) – Game summary

Quarter	1	2	3	4	Total
Trojans	0	14	0	0	14
No. 25 Dukes	3	14	0	14	31

at Bridgeforth Stadium • Harrisonburg, VA

- Date: December 5, 2025
- Game time: 7:00 p.m. EDT
- Game weather: Cloudy • Temperature: 26 °F (−3 °C) • Wind: 2 mph SW
- Game attendance: 19,836
- Referee: Tim Barker
- TV announcers (ESPN): Anish Shroff (play-by-play), Andre Ware (analyst) and Paul Carcaterra (sideline reporter)

Game information

First quarter

- (1:55) JMU – Morgan Suarez 40-yard field goal (Drive: 6 plays, 11 yards, 2:28; James Madison 3–0)

Second quarter

- (14:01) TROY – Goose Crowder 1-yard run, Scott Taylor Renfroe kick (Drive: 6 plays, 75 yards, 2:24; Troy 7–3)
- (13:41) JMU – Wayne Knight 73-yard run, Morgan Suarez kick (Drive: 1 play, 73 yards, 0:14; James Madison 10–7)
- (6:56) JMU – Braeden Wisloski 26-yard pass from Alonza Barnett III, Morgan Suarez kick (Drive: 3 plays, 44 yards, 1:24; James Madison 17–7)
- (2:12) TROY – Tae Meadows 2-yard run, Scott Taylor Renfroe kick (Drive: 11 plays, 75 yards, 4:44; James Madison 17–14)

Third quarter

- No scoring plays.

Fourth quarter

- (4:11) JMU – Alonza Barnett III 26-yard run, Morgan Suarez kick (Drive: 5 plays, 83 yards, 2:25; James Madison 24–14)
- (3:17) JMU – Drew Spinogatti 22-yard fumble returned, Morgan Suarez kick (Drive: 4 plays, -65 yards, 0:46; James Madison 31–14)

Statistics	TROY	JMU
First downs	12	19
Plays–yards	67–177	67–411
Rushes–yards	28-(-26)	42–318
Passing yards	203	93
Passing: Comp–Att–Int	16-39-0	10-25-1
Turnovers	1	2
Time of possession	29:26	30:34

Team	Category	Player	Statistics
Troy	Passing	Goose Crowder	15/34, 196 yards
Troy	Rushing	Tae Meadows	7 carries, 10 yards, TD
Troy	Receiving	RaRa Thomas	3 receptions, 82 yards
James Madison	Passing	Alonza Barnett III	10/25, 93 yards, TD, INT
James Madison	Rushing	Wayne Knight	21 carries, 212 yards, TD
James Madison	Receiving	Braeden Wisloski	2 receptions, 31 yards, TD

=== at Oregon (CFP First Round) ===
CFP First Round Game
No. 12 James Madison Dukes (12–1) at No. 5 Oregon Ducks (11–1) – Game summary

Quarter	1	2	3	4	Total
No. 12 Dukes	3	3	14	14	34
No. 5 Ducks	13	21	14	3	51

at Autzen Stadium • Eugene, OR

- Date: December 20
- Game time: 7:30 p.m. EST
- Game weather: Cloudy
- Game attendance: 55,124
- Referee: Kyle Olson (SEC)
- TV announcers (TNT): Bob Wischusen, Louis Riddick, Kris Budden and Stormy Buonantony

Game information

First Quarter

- (13:17) ORE – Jamari Johnson 41-yard pass from Dante Moore, two-point conversion run attempt failed (Drive: 4 plays, 68 yards, 1:38; Oregon 6–0)
- (5:14) JMU – Morgan Suarez 30-yard field goal (Drive: 15 plays, 63 yards, 8:03; Oregon 6–3)
- (2:37) ORE – Dante Moore 5-yard run, Atticus Sappington kick (Drive: 5 plays, 75 yards, 2:37; Oregon 13–3)

Second Quarter

- (11:33) ORE – Dierre Hill Jr. 56-yard run, Atticus Sappington kick (Drive: 3 plays, 78 yards, 1:34; Oregon 20–3)
- (9:18) ORE – Jeremiah McClellan 20-yard pass from Dante Moore, Atticus Sappington kick (Drive: 4 plays, 63 yards, 1:18; Oregon 27–3)
- (4:22) ORE – Malik Benson 46-yard pass from Dante Moore, Gage Hurych kick (Drive: 5 plays, 80 yards, 1:45; Oregon 34–3)
- (0:06) JMU – Morgan Suarez 38-yard field goal (Drive: 9 plays, 33 yards, 0:54; Oregon 34–6)

Third Quarter

- (12:08) JMU – Nick DeGennaro 47-yard pass from Alonza Barnett III, Morgan Suarez kick (Drive: 6 plays, 75 yards, 2:52; Oregon 34–13)
- (10:24) ORE – Malik Benson 45-yard pass from Dante Moore, Gage Hurych kick (Drive: 4 plays, 76 yards, 1:40; Oregon 41–13)
- (7:05) ORE – Jayden Limar 15-yard return of blocked punt, Gage Hurych kick (Drive: 3 plays, 3 yards, 0:55; Oregon 48–13)
- (1:15) JMU – George Pettaway 24-yard pass from Alonza Barnett III, Morgan Suarez kick (Drive: 4 plays, 36 yards, 1:46; Oregon 48–20)

Fourth Quarter

- (10:26) JMU – Lacota Dippre 2-yard run, two-point pass conversion attempt failed (Drive: 9 plays, 89 yards, 3:40; Oregon 48–26)
- (4:22) ORE – Atticus Sappington 48-yard field goal (Drive: 10 plays, 17 yards, 6:04; Oregon 51–26)
- (1:05) JMU – Alonza Barnett III 1-yard run, Alonza Barnett III two-point conversion pass to Nick DeGennaro (Drive: 9 plays, 99 yards, 3:17; Oregon 51–34)

Statistics	JMU	ORE
First downs	23	22
Plays–yards	84–509	53–514
Rushes–yards	35–186	26–201
Passing yards	323	313
Passing: Comp–Att–Int	24–49–0	19–27–2
Turnovers	0	2
Time of possession	35:50	24:10

Team	Category	Player	Statistics
James Madison	Passing	Alonza Barnett III	24/38, 273 yards, 2 TD
James Madison	Rushing	Wayne Knight	17 carries, 110 yards
James Madison	Receiving	Nick DeGennaro	5 receptions, 90 yards, TD
Oregon	Passing	Dante Moore	19/27, 313 yards, 4 TD, 2 INT
Oregon	Rushing	Jordon Davison	10 carries, 90 yards
Oregon	Receiving	Malik Benson	5 receptions, 119 yards, 2 TD

== Personnel ==
2025 James Madison Dukes football team roster
Players
Coaches
Offense

Pos.	#	Name	Class
WR	0	Jaylan Sanchez	Sr
QB	1	JC Evans	Fr
WR	2	Jayden Mines	Jr
RB	3	Wayne Knight	Jr
RB	5	Ayo Adeyi	Sr
RB	6	George Pettaway	Jr
QB	7	Camden Coleman	Jr
WR	8	Isaiah Alston	Sr
QB	9	Matthew Sluka	Sr
WR	10	Braeden Wisloski	Jr
WR	11	Nick DeGennaro	Sr
WR	12	Za'Ron Collins	So
WR	13	Landon Ellis	Jr
QB	14	Alonza Barnett III	Jr
QB	15	Blake Kendall	Jr
TE	15	Lacota Dippre	So
WR	16	Arrion Concepcion	Fr
WR	17	Michael Scott	Fr
TE	18	Logan Kyle	Sr
RB	21	Jackson McCarter	Fr
RB	23	Jordan Fuller	Sr
RB	28	Jobi Malary	Sr
RB	29	Tre Leonard	Fr
WR	43	Miles Halbert	Fr
OL	52	Carter Sweazie	Jr
OL	55	Riley Robell	So
OL	56	JaKobe Campbell	Fr
OL	57	Jacob Bailey	Fr
OL	58	Griffin Hart	So
OL	60	Zach Greenberg	Sr
OL	65	Parker Cunningham	Fr
OL	66	JD Rayner	Fr
OL	67	Jacob Hohenshelt	Fr
OL	68	Trent Wilson	Fr
OL	70	Brett Davis	Sr
OL	71	Deacon Rawls	Fr
OL	72	Josh Toner	Sr
OL	73	Evan Bushong	Fr
OL	74	Sani Reed	Fr
OL	75	Wyatt Maines	Fr
OL	76	Pat McMurtrie	GS
OL	77	Cam McNair	Sr
OL	78	James Pogorelc	Sr
OL	79	Joseph Simmons	Jr
WR	81	Chase Pensyl	Fr
WR	82	Jamarcus Smith Jr.	Fr
WR	83	Chase Miller	Jr
TE	84	Brian Hnat	Fr
TE	85	Ryder Post	Fr
TE	86	Ethan Gurela	Fr
WR	88	Dylan Williams	So
TE	89	Josh Phifer	So

Defense

Pos.	#	Name	Class
DL	0	Immanuel Bush	Sr
CB	1	Mekhi Rodgers	Sr
CB	2	Elijah Culp	Sr
LB	3	Gannon Weathersby	Jr
LB	5	Trent Hendrick	Sr
CB	6	Chantz Harley	Sr
S	7	Jacob Thomas	Sr
DL	8	Amar Thomas	Jr
DL	9	Xavier Holmes	Sr
LB	10	JT Kouame-Yao	Sr
LB	11	Trashon Dye	Fr
S	12	Kye Holmes	Sr
S	13	Tyler Brown	So
NIC	14	KJ Flowe	So
DL	15	Sahir West	Fr
S	16	TJ McGill	So
CB	20	Jamaree Seldon	Jr
S	21	Curtis Harris-Lopez	Sr
S	22	Chase Regan	So
S	23	Ken Willis	Jr
S	24	Phillip Harris	Fr
LB	25	Jackson Hamill	Fr
LB	26	Jayden Studio	So
NIC	27	Kai Callen	Fr
CB	30	Justin Eaglin	Jr
CB	31	Roddrey McWilliams	Fr
NIC	32	DJ Barksdale	Jr
DL	33	Andrew Taddeo	Sr
CB	34	Jamal Olford	Fr
S	35	Joshua Prince	Fr
CB	36	Milt Ferguson	Fr
S	37	Seth Gathers	Fr
S	38	Stephen Hollander	Jr
NIC	39	Zicri Forest	Fr
LB	40	Jackson Snyder	So
S	41	George Lovelace	Fr
DL	44	DJ Cotton Jr.	So
LB	45	Lee Johnson	Fr
LB	46	Immanuel Ezeogu	Fr
S	47	Kevin Kabasele	Fr
LB	51	Danny Reagan	Fr
LB	54	Brandon Fique	Sr
LB	56	Drew Spinogatti	Jr
DL	62	Ibraheem Ramadan	Fr
DL	88	Kells Bush	Jr
DL	90	Terry Lockett Jr.	Sr
DL	92	Grayson Gilmore	Fr
DL	93	Mychal McMullin	So
DL	94	Jerald James	Fr
DL	96	Cole Purdy	Fr
DL	97	Aiden Gobaira	Jr
DL	98	Turner Schmidt	So
DL	99	Cole Webster	Fr

Special teams

Pos.	#	Name	Class
K	5	Morgan Suarez	Sr
P	11	Patrick Rea	Jr
K	19	Max Lipinski	Fr
LS	33	Logan Ketcham	Sr
LS	47	Josiah Kennard	Sr
K	95	Cristiano Rosa	Jr
P	96	Andrew VanSlyke	So

Head coach

- Bob Chesney

Coordinators/assistant coaches

- Dean Kennedy (Offensive coordinator / Quarterbacks)
- Colin Hitschler (Defensive coordinator)
- Drew Canan (Special teams coordinator / Tight ends)
- Chris Smith (Offensive line / run game coordinator)
- Anthony DiMichele (Safeties / recruiting coordinator)
- Eddie Whitley Jr. (Cornerbacks)
- Justin Harper (Wide receivers)
- Sam Daniels (Defensive line)
- David Sims Jr. (Running backs)
- Dave Plungas (Linebackers)
- Richard Rodgers Sr. (Assistant head coach)
- Kyle Barnes (Nickels)
- Eric Mele (Assistant special teams)
- Julio Ayamel (Graduate assistant)

Legend

- (C) Team captain
- (S) Suspended
- (I) Ineligible
- Injured
- Redshirt

Roster
Last update: January 26, 2025
