= Jacob Thomas =

Jacob Thomas may refer to:

- Jacob Thomas (VC) (1833–1911), British Victoria Cross recipient
- Jacob Thomas (police officer) (born 1960), Indian Police Service
- Jacob Thomas (soccer) (born 1977), American soccer player
- Jacob Thomas (American football) (born 2004), American football player
