= 2025 Sun Belt Conference football season =

- League: NCAA Division I Football Bowl Subdivision
- Sport: Football
- Duration: August 28, 2025 – December 5, 2025
- Teams: 14

2026 NFL draft
- Top draft pick: WR Ted Hurst, Georgia State
- Picked by: Tampa Bay Buccaneers, 84th overall

Regular season
- Season champions: James Madison
- Runners-up: Troy

SBC Championship Game
- Venue: Bridgeforth Stadium, Harrisonburg, Virginia
- Champions: James Madison
- Runners-up: Troy

Seasons
- ← 2024 2026 →

2025 Sun Belt Conference football standings
	Conf.			Overall
Team	W		L	W		L
East Division
No. 19 James Madison xy$^	8	–	0	12	–	2
Old Dominion	6	–	2	10	–	3
Coastal Carolina	5	–	3	6	–	7
Georgia Southern	4	–	4	7	–	6
Marshall	3	–	5	5	–	7
Appalachian State	2	–	6	5	–	8
Georgia State	0	–	8	1	–	11
West Division
Troy xy	6	–	2	8	–	6
Southern Miss	5	–	3	7	–	6
Louisiana	5	–	3	6	–	7
Arkansas State	5	–	3	7	–	6
Texas State	3	–	5	7	–	6
South Alabama	3	–	5	4	–	8
Louisiana–Monroe	1	–	7	3	–	9
Championship: James Madison 31, Troy 14
^ – College Football Playoff participant; $ – Conference champion; x – Division champion/co-champions; y – Championship game participant; Rankings from AP Poll

The 2025 Sun Belt Conference football season is the 25th season of college football play for the Sun Belt Conference (SBC) as part of the 2025 NCAA Division I FBS football season. The season began on August 28, 2025, and will conclude with the Conference Championship Game on December 5, 2025. The conference consists of 14 football members split into two divisions. The conference released its full season schedule on February 28, 2025.

== Preseason ==
=== Preseason Media Poll ===
The SBC released its preseason poll on July 21. James Madison was named the favorite to win the East Division, while Louisiana was named the favorite to win the West Division.

East
Predicted finish	Team	Votes (1st place)
1	James Madison	94 (11)
2	Georgia Southern	76 (1)
3	Appalachian State	60
4	Coastal Carolina	49 (1)
5	Old Dominion	48
6	Marshall	42 (1)
7	Georgia State	23

West
Predicted finish	Team	Votes (1st place)
1	Louisiana	86 (6)
2	Texas State	78 (6)
3	Arkansas State	64 (1)
4	South Alabama	50 (1)
5	Southern Miss	47
6	Troy	43
7	Louisiana–Monroe	24

=== Preseason All-Conference teams ===
- Offensive Player of the Year: Braylon Braxton (RS Senior, Southern Miss, quarterback)
- Defensive Player of the Year: Blayne Myrick (RS Junior, South Alabama, linebacker)
- Special Teams Player of the Year: Clune Van Andel (Junior, Arkansas State, kicker)

Position	Player	Team
First Team Offense
QB	Braylon Braxton	Southern Miss
RB	George Pettaway	James Madison
RB	Kentrel Bullock	South Alabama
OL	Nick Del Grande	Coastal Carolina
OL	Caleb Cook	Georgia Southern
OL	Pichon Wimbley	Georgia Southern
OL	Pat McMurtrie	James Madison
OL	Zach Barlev	Old Dominion
TE	Toby Payne	Marshall
WR	Corey Rucker	Arkansas State
WR	Josh Dallas	Georgia Southern
WR	Ted Hurst	Georgia State
First Team Defense
DL	Bryan Whitehead	Arkansas State
DL	Latrell Bullard	Georgia Southern
DL	Jordan Lawson	Louisiana
DL	Kevontay Wells	Louisiana–Monroe
DL	Brodarius Lewis	Southern Miss
LB	Brendan Harrington	Georgia Southern
LB	Jason Henderson	Old Dominion
LB	Blayne Myrick	South Alabama
DB	Chance Gamble	Georgia Southern
DB	Jacob Thomas	James Madison
DB	Tyree Skipper	Louisiana
DB	Josh Moten	Southern Miss
First Team Special Teams
K	Clune Van Andel	Arkansas State
P	Alex Smith	Georgia Southern
RS	Ian Foster	Southern Miss
AP	Ja'Quez Cross	Arkansas State

Position	Player	Team
Second Team Offense
QB	Alonza Barnett III	James Madison
RB	Ja'Quez Cross	Arkansas State
RB	Bill Davis	Louisiana
OL	Jax Harrington	Louisiana
OL	George Jackson	Louisiana
OL	Jalen Slappy	Marshall
OL	Jordan Davis	South Alabama
OL	Eli Russ	Troy
TE	Kyirin Heath	Southern Miss
WR	Dalton Stroman	Appalachian State
WR	Jameson Tucker	Coastal Carolina
WR	Dalen Cobb	Georgia Southern
Second Team Defense
DL	Henry Bryant	Georgia State
DL	Immanuel Bush	James Madison
DL	Kris Trinidad	Old Dominion
DL	Luis Medina	Troy
LB	Shane Bruce	Coastal Carolina
LB	Trent Hendrick	James Madison
LB	Cameron Whitfield	Louisiana
LB	Koa Naotala	Old Dominion
DB	Tracy Hill Jr.	Georgia Southern
DB	DJ Barksdale	James Madison
DB	Wesley Miller	South Alabama
DB	Devin Lafayette	Troy
Second Team Special Teams
K	Scott Taylor Renfroe	Troy
P	Aleksi Pulkkinen	South Alabama
RS	Ja'Quez Cross	Arkansas State
AP	George Pettaway	James Madison

== Head coaches ==
- On October 20, 2024, Southern Miss announced that they had fired head coach Will Hall after starting the season with a 1–6 record. Assistant head coach Reed Stringer was named the interim head coach. On December 8, 2024, Southern Miss announced that they had hired Charles Huff away from Marshall to be their head coach in 2025. Marshall's associate head coach Telly Lockette was named the interim head coach for Marshall's bowl game.
- On December 2, 2024, Appalachian State announced that they had fired head coach Shawn Clark. On December 7, Appalachian State announced Dowell Loggains as the new head coach. Loggains had previously been the offensive coordinator at South Carolina.
- On December 8, 2024, Marshall announced Tony Gibson as their new head coach for the 2025 season. Gibson had previously the defensive coordinator at NC State.

Team	Head coach	Previous job	Years at school	Overall record	Sun Belt record	Sun Belt titles
Appalachian State	Dowell Loggains	South Carolina (Offensive coordinator/QBs coach)	1	0–0 (–)	0–0 (–)	0
Arkansas State	Butch Jones	Alabama (assistant coach)	5	103–85 (.548)	11–21 (.344)	0
Coastal Carolina	Tim Beck	NC State (offensive coordinator)	3	14–12 (.538)	8–8 (.500)	0
Georgia Southern	Clay Helton	USC (head coach)	4	66–43 (.606)	12–12 (.500)	0
Georgia State	Dell McGee	Georgia (RB coach/run game coordinator)	2	4–9 (.308)	1–7 (.125)	0
James Madison	Bob Chesney	Holy Cross (head coach)	2	120–50 (.706)	4–4 (.500)	0
Louisiana	Michael Desormeaux	Louisiana (co-offensive coordinator)	4	23–18 (.561)	14–10 (.583)	0
Louisiana–Monroe	Bryant Vincent	New Mexico (offensive coordinator)	2	12–13 (.480)	3–5 (.375)	0
Marshall	Tony Gibson	NC State (Defensive coordinator/Linebackers coach)	1	0–0 (–)	0–0 (–)	0
Old Dominion	Ricky Rahne	Penn State (offensive coordinator)	6	20–30 (.400)	16–16 (.500)	0
South Alabama	Major Applewhite	South Alabama (offensive coordinator)	2	22–17 (.564)	5–3 (.625)	0
Southern Miss	Charles Huff	Marshall (head coach)	1	32–20 (.615)	20–12 (.625)	1
Texas State	G. J. Kinne	Incarnate Word (head coach)	3	28–12 (.700)	9–7 (.563)	0
Troy	Gerad Parker	Notre Dame (offensive coordinator)	2	4–14 (.222)	3–5 (.375)	0

== Rankings ==
		Pre	Wk 1	Wk 2	Wk 3	Wk 4	Wk 5	Wk 6	Wk 7	Wk 8	Wk 9	Wk 10	Wk 11	Wk 12	Wk 13	Wk 14	Wk 15	Final
Appalachian State	AP																	
Appalachian State	C																	
Appalachian State	CFP	Not released																
Arkansas State	AP																	
Arkansas State	C																	
Arkansas State	CFP	Not released																
Coastal Carolina	AP																	
Coastal Carolina	C																	
Coastal Carolina	CFP	Not released																
Georgia Southern	AP																	
Georgia Southern	C																	
Georgia Southern	CFP	Not released																
Georgia State	AP																	
Georgia State	C																	
Georgia State	CFP	Not released																
James Madison	AP	RV	RV	NR						RV	RV	RV	24	21	20	19	19	19
James Madison	C									RV	RV	RV	25	22	21	19	19	20
James Madison	CFP	Not released														25	24	
Louisiana	AP	RV	NR															
Louisiana	C																	
Louisiana	CFP	Not released																
Louisiana–Monroe	AP																	
Louisiana–Monroe	C																	
Louisiana–Monroe	CFP	Not released																
Marshall	AP																	
Marshall	C																	
Marshall	CFP	Not released																
Old Dominion	AP																	RV
Old Dominion	C						RV	NR								RV	RV	RV
Old Dominion	CFP	Not released																
South Alabama	AP																	
South Alabama	C																	
South Alabama	CFP	Not released																
Southern Miss	AP																	
Southern Miss	C																	
Southern Miss	CFP	Not released																
Texas State	AP																	
Texas State	C																	
Texas State	CFP	Not released																
Troy	AP																	
Troy	C																	
Troy	CFP	Not released																

Legend
	Improvement in ranking
	Drop in ranking
	Not ranked previous week
	No change in ranking from previous week
RV	Received votes but were not ranked in Top 25 of poll
т	Tied with team above or below also with this symbol

== Schedule ==
The 2025 schedule was released on February 28, 2025.

Index to colors and formatting
Sun Belt member won
Sun Belt member lost
Sun Belt teams in **bold**

=== Week 1 ===
Date	Time	Visiting team	Home team	Site	TV	Result	Attendance	Ref.
August 28	6:00 p.m.	Saint Francis (PA)	**Louisiana–Monroe**	Malone Stadium • Monroe, LA	ESPN+	**W** 29–0	12,459	
August 29	6:00 p.m.	**Appalachian State**	Charlotte	Bank of America Stadium • Charlotte, NC (Duke's Mayo Classic)	ESPNU	**W** 34–11	35,718	
August 30	11:00 a.m.	Mississippi State	**Southern Miss**	M. M. Roberts Stadium • Hattiesburg, MS	ESPN	**L** 17–34	33,485	
August 30	1:30 p.m.	**Old Dominion**	No. 20 Indiana	Memorial Stadium • Bloomington, IN	FS1	**L** 14–27	47,109	
August 30	2:30 p.m.	**Marshall**	No. 5 Georgia	Sanford Stadium • Athens, GA	ESPN	**L** 7–45	93,033	
August 30	5:00 p.m.	**Coastal Carolina**	Virginia	Scott Stadium • Charlottesville, VA	ACCN	**L** 7–48	46,143	
August 30	5:00 p.m.	Weber State	**James Madison**	Bridgeforth Stadium • Harrisonburg, VA	ESPN+	**W** 45–10	24,965	
August 30	6:00 p.m.	Southeast Missouri State	**Arkansas State**	Centennial Bank Stadium • Jonesboro, AR	ESPN+	**W** 42–24	18,241	
August 30	6:00 p.m.	Morgan State	**South Alabama**	Hancock Whitney Stadium • Mobile, AL	ESPN+	**W** 38–21		
August 30	6:00 p.m.	Nicholls	**Troy**	Veterans Memorial Stadium • Troy, AL	ESPN+	**W** 38–20	25,546	
August 30	6:45 p.m.	**Georgia State**	No. 21 Ole Miss	Vaught–Hemingway Stadium • Oxford, MS	SECN	**L** 7–63	66,378	
August 30	7:00 p.m.	Rice	**Louisiana**	Cajun Field • Lafayette, LA	ESPN+	**L** 12–14	22,148	
August 30	7:00 p.m.	Eastern Michigan	**Texas State**	UFCU Stadium • San Marcos, TX	ESPN+	**W** 52–27	21,082	
August 30	8:30 p.m.	**Georgia Southern**	Fresno State	Valley Children's Stadium • Fresno, CA	FS1	**L** 14–42	36,801	
^{#}Rankings from AP Poll released prior to game. All times are in Central Time.

=== Week 2 ===
Date	Time	Visiting team	Home team	Site	TV	Result	Attendance	Ref.
September 5	6:00 p.m.	**James Madison**	Louisville	L&N Federal Credit Union Stadium • Louisville, KY	ESPN2	**L** 14–28	48,717	
September 6	2:30 p.m.	Lindenwood	**Appalachian State**	Kidd Brewer Stadium • Boone, NC	ESPN+	**W** 20–13	34,921	
September 6	2:30 p.m.	**Texas State**	UTSA	Alamodome • San Antonio, TX (I-35 Rivalry)	ESPN+	**W** 43–36	45,778	
September 6	2:30 p.m.	**Troy**	No. 8 Clemson	Memorial Stadium • Clemson, SC	ACCN	**L** 16–27	77,890	
September 6	4:00 p.m.	**Arkansas State**	Arkansas	War Memorial Stadium • Fayetteville, AR	ESPN+	**L** 14–56	54,224	
September 6	4:00 p.m.	No. 15 (FCS) Jackson State	**Southern Miss**	M. M. Roberts Stadium • Hattiesburg, MS	ESPN+	**W** 38–20	32,011	
September 6	5:00 p.m.	Missouri State	**Marshall**	Joan C. Edwards Stadium • Huntington, WV	ESPN+	**L** 20–21	28,564	
September 6	5:00 p.m.	North Carolina Central	**Old Dominion**	S.B. Ballard Stadium • Norfolk, VA	ESPN+	**W** 54–6	18,111	
September 6	6:00 p.m.	Memphis	**Georgia State**	Center Parc Stadium • Atlanta, GA	ESPN+	**L** 16–38	13,625	
September 6	6:00 p.m.	Tulane	**South Alabama**	Hancock Whitney Stadium • Mobile, AL	ESPN+	**L** 31–33	16,871	
September 6	6:30 p.m.	Charleston Southern	**Coastal Carolina**	Brooks Stadium • Conway, SC	ESPN+	**W** 13–0	22,217	
September 6	6:30 p.m.	**Georgia Southern**	USC	Los Angeles Memorial Coliseum • Los Angeles, CA	FS1	**L** 20–59	66,514	
September 6	6:45 p.m.	**Louisiana–Monroe**	No. 21 Alabama	Bryant–Denny Stadium • Tuscaloosa, AL	SECN	**L** 0–73	100,077	
September 6	7:00 p.m.	McNeese	**Louisiana**	Cajun Field • Lafayette, LA (Cajun Crown)	ESPN+	**W** 34–10	26,071	
^{#}Rankings from AP Poll released prior to game. All times are in Central Time.

=== Week 3 ===
Date	Time	Visiting team	Home team	Site	TV	Result	Attendance	Ref.
September 13	11:00 a.m.	Memphis	**Troy**	Veterans Memorial Stadium • Troy, AL	ESPNU	**L** 7–28	23,384	
September 13	11:45 a.m.	**South Alabama**	No. 24 Auburn	Jordan-Hare Stadium • Auburn, AL	SECN	**L** 15–31	88,043	
September 13	12:00 p.m.	**Louisiana**	No. 25 Missouri	Faurot Field • Columbia, MO	ESPN+	**L** 10–52	57,321	
September 13	3:00 p.m.	No. 14 Iowa State	**Arkansas State**	Centennial Bank Stadium • Jonesboro, AR	ESPN2	**L** 16–24	22,248	
September 13	5:00 p.m.	Eastern Kentucky	**Marshall**	Joan C. Edwards Stadium • Huntington, WV	ESPN+	**W** 38–7	23,925	
September 13	6:00 p.m.	Jacksonville State	**Georgia Southern**	Paulson Stadium • Statesboro, GA	ESPN+	**W** 41–34	24,585	
September 13	6:00 p.m.	Murray State	**Georgia State**	Center Parc Stadium • Atlanta, GA	ESPN+	**W** 37–21	13,988	
September 13	6:00 p.m.	**Old Dominion**	Virginia Tech	Lane Stadium • Blacksburg, VA	ACCN	**W** 45–26	57,627	
September 13	6:00 p.m.	**Appalachian State**	**Southern Miss**	M. M. Roberts Stadium • Hattiesburg, MS	ESPN+	**USM** 38–22	24,534	
September 13	6:30 p.m.	East Carolina	**Coastal Carolina**	Brooks Stadium • Conway, SC	ESPN+	**L** 0–38	21,634	
September 13	9:30 p.m.	**Texas State**	Arizona State	Mountain America Stadium • Tempe, AZ	TNT	**L** 15–34	54,005	
^{#}Rankings from AP Poll released prior to game. All times are in Central Time.

=== Week 4 ===
Date	Time	Visiting team	Home team	Site	TV	Result	Attendance	Ref.
September 20	2:30 p.m.	**James Madison**	Liberty	Williams Stadium • Lynchburg, VA (Battle of the Blue Ridge)	ESPNU	**W** 31–13	24,022	
September 20	2:30 p.m.	**Louisiana**	Eastern Michigan	Rynearson Stadium • Ypsilanti, MI	ESPN+	**L** 31–34	18,371	
September 20	2:30 p.m.	**Troy**	Buffalo	UB Stadium • Buffalo, NY	ESPN+	**W** 21–17	12,068	
September 20	5:00 p.m.	**Arkansas State**	Kennesaw State	Fifth Third Stadium • Kennesaw, GA	ESPN+	**L** 21–28	10,713	
September 20	6:00 p.m.	Maine	**Georgia Southern**	Paulson Stadium • Statesboro, GA	ESPN+	**W** 45–17	23,217	
September 20	6:00 p.m.	**Marshall**	Middle Tennessee	Johnny "Red" Floyd Stadium • Murfreesboro, TN	ESPN+	**W** 42–28	15,168	
September 20	6:00 p.m.	**Coastal Carolina**	**South Alabama**	Hancock Whitney Stadium • Mobile, AL	ESPN+	**CCU** 38–20	17,050	
September 20	6:30 p.m.	**Georgia State**	No. 20 Vanderbilt	FirstBank Stadium • Nashville, TN	ESPNU	**L** 21-70	35,000	
September 20	6:30 p.m.	**Southern Miss**	Louisiana Tech	Joe Aillet Stadium • Ruston, LA (Rivalry in Dixie)	ESPN+	**L** 20–30	17,108	
September 20	7:00 p.m.	Nicholls	**Texas State**	UFCU Stadium • San Marcos, TX (Battle for the Paddle)	ESPN+	**W** 35–3	31,500	
September 20	8:00 p.m.	**Louisiana–Monroe**	UTEP	Sun Bowl • El Paso, TX	ESPN+	**W** 31–25	15,272	
^{#}Rankings from AP Poll released prior to game. All times are in Central Time.

=== Week 5 ===
Date	Time	Visiting team	Home team	Site	TV	Result	Attendance	Ref.
September 27	11:00 a.m.	**South Alabama**	North Texas	DATCU Stadium • Denton, TX	ESPNU	**L** 22–36	16,575	
September 27	12:30 p.m.	**Georgia Southern**	**James Madison**	Bridgeforth Stadium • Harrisonburg, VA	ESPN+	**JMU** 35–10	25,029	
September 27	2:00 p.m.	**Arkansas State**	**Louisiana–Monroe**	Malone Stadium • Monroe, LA	ESPN+	**ULM** 28–16	21,147	
September 27	5:00 p.m.	Liberty	**Old Dominion**	S.B. Ballard Stadium • Norfolk, VA	ESPN+	**W** 21–7	18,435	
September 27	6:00 p.m.	Jacksonville State	**Southern Miss**	M. M. Roberts Stadium • Hattiesburg, MS	ESPN+	**W** 42–25	25,034	
September 27	6:30 p.m.	**Appalachian State**	Boise State	Albertsons Stadium • Boise, ID	FS1	**L** 14–47	32,904	
September 27	7:00 p.m.	**Marshall**	**Louisiana**	Cajun Field • Lafayette, LA	ESPN+	**ULL** 54–51 ^{2OT}	20,125	
^{#}Rankings from AP Poll released prior to game. All times are in Central Time.

=== Week 6 ===
Date	Time	Visiting team	Home team	Site	TV	Result	Attendance	Ref.
October 4	2:30 p.m.	Oregon State	**Appalachian State**	Kidd Brewer Stadium • Boone, NC	ESPN+	**W** 27–23	35,021	
October 4	2:30 p.m.	**James Madison**	**Georgia State**	Center Parc Stadium • Atlanta, GA	ESPN+	**JMU** 14–7	19,256	
October 4	2:30 p.m.	**Louisiana–Monroe**	Northwestern	Martin Stadium • Evanston, IL	BTN	**L** 7–42	12,023	
October 4	3:00 p.m.	**Texas State**	**Arkansas State**	Centennial Bank Stadium • Jonesboro, AR	ESPNU	**ARKST** 31–30	15,841	
October 4	5:00 p.m.	**Coastal Carolina**	**Old Dominion**	S.B. Ballard Stadium • Norfolk, VA	ESPN+	**ODU** 47–7	20,895	
October 4	6:00 p.m.	**South Alabama**	**Troy**	Veterans Memorial Stadium • Troy, AL (rivalry)	ESPN+	**TROY** 31–24 ^{OT}	28,035	
^{#}Rankings from AP Poll released prior to game. All times are in Central Time.

=== Week 7 ===
Date	Time	Visiting team	Home team	Site	TV	Result	Attendance	Ref.
October 9	7:00 p.m.	Southern Miss	Georgia Southern	Paulson Stadium • Statesboro, GA	ESPN2	**USM** 38–35	20,032	
October 11	11:00 a.m.	Louisiana	James Madison	Bridgeforth Stadium • Harrisonburg, VA	ESPN2	**JMU** 24–14	25,128	
October 11	2:30 p.m.	Appalachian State	Georgia State	Center Parc Stadium • Atlanta, GA	ESPN+	**APPST** 41–20	19,587	
October 11	2:30 p.m.	Old Dominion	Marshall	Joan C. Edwards Stadium • Huntington, WV	ESPN+	**MRSH** 48–24	23,515	
October 11	6:00 p.m.	Louisiana–Monroe	Coastal Carolina	Brooks Stadium • Conway, SC	ESPN+	**CCU** 23–8	15,211	
October 11	7:00 p.m.	Troy	Texas State	UFCU Stadium • San Marcos, TX	ESPN+	**TROY** 48–41 ^{OT}	24,369	
^{#}Rankings from AP Poll released prior to game. All times are in Central Time.

=== Week 8 ===
Date	Time	Visiting team	Home team	Site	TV	Result	Attendance	Ref.
October 14	6:30 p.m.	Arkansas State	South Alabama	Hancock Whitney Stadium • Mobile, AL	ESPN2	**ARKST** 15–14	19,634	
October 18	2:00 p.m.	Troy	Louisiana–Monroe	Malone Stadium • Monroe, LA	ESPN+	**TROY** 37–14	16,863	
October 18	2:30 p.m.	Coastal Carolina	Appalachian State	Kidd Brewer Stadium • Boone, NC	ESPN+	**CCU** 45–37	33,862	
October 18	2:30 p.m.	Old Dominion	James Madison	Bridgeforth Stadium • Harrisonburg, VA (Royal Rivalry)	ESPNU	**JMU** 63–27	25,232	
October 18	2:30 p.m.	Texas State	Marshall	Joan C. Edwards Stadium • Huntington, WV	ESPN+	**MU** 40–37 ^{2OT}	27,533	
October 18	4:00 p.m.	Southern Miss	Louisiana	Cajun Field • Lafayette, LA	ESPN+	**USM** 22–10	21,047	
October 18	6:00 p.m.	Georgia State	Georgia Southern	Paulson Stadium • Statesboro, GA (rivalry)	ESPN+	**GASO** 41–24	25,428	
^{#}Rankings from AP Poll released prior to game. All times are in Central Time.

=== Week 9 ===
Date	Time	Visiting team	Home team	Site	TV	Result	Attendance	Ref.
October 23	6:30 p.m.	**South Alabama**	**Georgia State**	Center Parc Stadium • Atlanta, GA	ESPN2	**SOAL** 38–31	13,673	
October 25	11:00 a.m.	**Appalachian State**	**Old Dominion**	S.B. Ballard Stadium • Norfolk, VA	ESPNU	**ODU** 24–21	18,097	
October 25	2:30 p.m.	**Louisiana–Monroe**	**Southern Miss**	M. M. Roberts Stadium • Hattiesburg, MS	ESPN+	**USM** 49–21	27,111	
October 25	6:00 p.m.	**Georgia Southern**	**Arkansas State**	Centennial Bank Stadium • Jonesboro, AR	ESPN+	**ARKST** 34–24	16,341	
October 25	6:00 p.m.	**Louisiana**	**Troy**	Veterans Memorial Stadium • Troy, AL	ESPN+	**TROY** 35–23	16,341	
^{#}Rankings from AP Poll released prior to game. All times are in Central Time.

=== Week 10 ===
Date	Time	Visiting team	Home team	Site	TV	Result	Attendance	Ref.
October 28	6:30 p.m.	**James Madison**	**Texas State**	UFCU Stadium • San Marcos, TX	ESPN2	**JMU** 52–20	17,363	
October 30	6:30 p.m.	**Marshall**	**Coastal Carolina**	Brooks Stadium • Conway, SC	ESPN2	**CCU** 44–27	17,034	
November 1	2:30 p.m.	**Old Dominion**	**Louisiana–Monroe**	Malone Stadium • Monroe, LA	ESPN+	**ODU** 31–6	17,087	
November 1	2:30 p.m.	**Louisiana**	**South Alabama**	Hancock Whitney Stadium • Mobile, AL	ESPN+	**ULL** 31–22	18,462	
November 1	7:00 p.m.	**Arkansas State**	**Troy**	Veterans Memorial Stadium • Troy, AL	ESPNU	**ARKST** 23–10	23,391	
^{#}Rankings from AP Poll released prior to game. All times are in Central Time.

=== Week 11 ===
Date	Time	Visiting team	Home team	Site	TV	Result	Attendance	Ref.
November 6	6:30 p.m.	**Georgia Southern**	**Appalachian State**	Kidd Brewer Stadium • Boone, NC (rivalry)	ESPN2	**GASO** 25–23	31,876	
November 8	11:00 a.m.	**James Madison**	**Marshall**	Joan C. Edwards Stadium • Huntington, WV	ESPN2	**JMU** 35–23	26,727	
November 8	11:00 a.m.	**Southern Miss**	**Arkansas State**	Centennial Bank Stadium • Jonesboro, AR	ESPNU	**USM** 27–21	15,441	
November 8	3:00 p.m.	**Georgia State**	**Coastal Carolina**	Brooks Stadium • Conway, SC	ESPN+	**CCU** 40–27	18,878	
November 8	4:00 p.m.	**Texas State**	**Louisiana**	Cajun Field • Lafayette, LA	ESPN+	**ULL** 42–39	14,231	
^{#}Rankings from College Football Playoff. All times are in Central Time.

=== Week 12 ===
Date	Time	Visiting team	Home team	Site	TV	Result	Attendance	Ref.
November 13	6:30 p.m.	Troy	Old Dominion	S.B. Ballard Stadium • Norfolk, VA	ESPN	**ODU** 33–0	18,831	
November 15	1:00 p.m.	Marshall	Georgia State	Center Parc stadium • Atlanta, GA	ESPN+	**MU** 30–18		
November 15	2:30 p.m.	Appalachian State	James Madison	Bridgeforth Stadium • Harrisonburg, VA	ESPN+	**JMU** 58–10		
November 15	2:30 p.m.	South Alabama	Louisiana–Monroe	Malone Stadium • Monroe, LA	ESPN+	**SOAL** 26–14		
November 15	2:30 p.m.	Texas State	Southern Miss	M. M. Roberts Stadium • Hattiesburg, MS	ESPN+	**TXST** 41–14		
November 15	5:00 p.m.	Coastal Carolina	Georgia Southern	Paulson Stadium • Stateboro, GA	ESPN+	**GASO** 45–40		
^{#}Rankings from College Football Playoff. All times are in Central Time.

=== Week 13 ===
Date	Time	Visiting team	Home team	Site	TV	Result	Attendance	Ref.
November 20	6:30 p.m.	**Louisiana**	**Arkansas State**	Centennial Bank Stadium • Jonesboro, AR	ESPN	**ULL** 34–30		
November 22	12:00 p.m.	Washington State	**James Madison**	Bridgeforth Stadium • Harrisonburg, VA	ESPN+	**W** 24–20		
November 22	12:00 p.m.	**Old Dominion**	**Georgia Southern**	Paulson Stadium • Statesboro, GA	ESPN+	**ODU** 45–10		
November 22	1:30 p.m.	**Marshall**	**Appalachian State**	Kidd Brewer Stadium • Boone, NC (rivalry)	ESPN+	**APPST** 26–24		
November 22	2:30 p.m.	**Southern Miss**	**South Alabama**	Hancock Whitney Stadium • Mobile, AL	ESPN+	**SOAL** 42–35		
November 22	3:00 p.m	**Georgia State**	**Troy**	Veterans Memorial Stadium • Troy, AL	ESPN+	**TROY** 31–19		
November 22	3:15 p.m.	**Coastal Carolina**	South Carolina	Williams–Brice Stadium • Columbia, SC	SECN	**L** 7–51		
November 22	4:00 p.m.	**Louisiana–Monroe**	**Texas State**	UFCU Stadium • San Marcos, TX	ESPN+	**TXST** 31–14		
^{#}Rankings from College Football Playoff. All times are in Central Time.

=== Week 14 ===
Date	Time	Visiting team	Home team	Site	TV	Result	Attendance	Ref.
November 29	12:30 p.m.	Georgia Southern	Marshall	Joan C. Edwards Stadium • Huntington, WV	ESPN+	**GASO** 24–19		
November 29	1:00 p.m.	Georgia State	Old Dominion	S.B. Ballard Stadium • Norfolk, VA	ESPN+	**ODU** 27–10		
November 29	1:30 p.m.	Arkansas State	Appalachian State	Kidd Brewer Stadium • Boone, NC	ESPN+	**ARKST** 30–29		
November 29	2:00 p.m.	Louisiana–Monroe	Louisiana	Cajun Field • Lafayette, LA (Battle on the Bayou)	ESPN+	**ULL** 30–27 ^{OT}		
November 29	2:00 p.m.	South Alabama	Texas State	UFCU Stadium • San Marcos, TX	ESPN+	**TXST** 49–26		
November 29	2:30 p.m.	Troy	Southern Miss	M. M. Roberts Stadium • Hattiesburg, MS	ESPN+	**TROY** 28–18		
November 29	2:45 p.m.	James Madison	Coastal Carolina	Brooks Stadium • Conway, SC	ESPNU	**JMU** 59–10		
^{#}Rankings from College Football Playoff. All times are in Central Time.

=== Championship Game ===
Date	Time	Visiting team	Home team	Site	TV	Result	Attendance	Ref.
December 5	6:00 p.m.	**Troy**	**James Madison**	Bridgeforth Stadium • Harrisonburg, VA	ESPN	**JMU** 31–14	19,836	
^{#}Rankings from College Football Playoff. All times are in Central Time.

== Postseason ==
=== Bowl Games ===
Legend
Sun Belt win
Sun Belt loss

Bowl game	Date	Site	Television	Time (CST)	Sun Belt team	Opponent	Score	Attendance
Salute to Veterans Bowl	December 16	Cramton Bowl • Montgomery, AL	ESPN	8:00 p.m.	Troy	Jacksonville State	L 13–17	15,721
Cure Bowl	December 17	Camping World Stadium • Orlando, FL	ESPN	4:00 p.m.	Old Dominion	South Florida	W 24–10	15,036
68 Ventures Bowl	December 17	Hancock Whitney Stadium • Mobile, AL	ESPN	7:30 p.m.	Louisiana	Delaware	L 13–20	17,234
Xbox Bowl	December 18	Ford Center at The Star • Frisco, TX	ESPN2	8:00 p.m.	Arkansas State	Missouri State	W 34–28	7,782
New Orleans Bowl	December 23	Caesars Superdome • New Orleans, LA	ESPN	4:30 p.m.	Southern Miss	Western Kentucky	L 16–27	16,693
Birmingham Bowl	December 29	Protective Stadium • Birmingham, AL	ESPN	1:00 p.m.	Georgia Southern	Appalachian State (Note: Appalachian State was selected as the second team for the Birmingham Bowl despite being in-conference with Georgia Southern, as all teams ahead of Appalachian State in the selection process declined the invitation.)	GASO 29–10	12,092
Independence Bowl	December 30	Independence Stadium • Shreveport, LA	ESPN	1:00 p.m.	Coastal Carolina	Louisiana Tech	L 14–23	30,298
Armed Forces Bowl	January 2, 2026	Amon G. Carter Stadium • Fort Worth, TX	ESPN	12:00 p.m.	Texas State	Rice		
College Football Playoff bowl games
College Football Playoff (First round)	December 20	Autzen Stadium • Eugene, OR	TNT	6:30 p.m.	James Madison	Oregon	L 34–51	55,124

== Sun Belt records vs. other conferences ==
2025–2026 records against non-conference foes:

Regular season

Power Four Conferences	Record
ACC	1–3
Big 12	0–2
Big Ten	0–3
Notre Dame	0–0
SEC	0–9
Power 4 Total	1–17
Other FBS Conferences	Record
American	2–6
C-USA	6–3
Independents (Excluding Notre Dame)	0–0
MAC	2–1
Mountain West	0–2
Pac-12	2–0
Other FBS Total	12–12
FCS Opponents	Record
Football Championship Subdivision	14–0
Total Non-Conference Record	27–29

=== Sun Belt vs Power 4 matchups ===
This is a list of games the Sun Belt has scheduled versus power conference teams (ACC, Big Ten, Big 12, Notre Dame and SEC). All rankings are from the current AP Poll at the time of the game.

Date	Conference	Visitor	Home	Site	Score
August 30	ACC	Coastal Carolina	Virginia	Scott Stadium • Charlottesville, VA	L 7–48
August 30	SEC	Georgia State	Ole Miss	Vaught–Hemingway Stadium • Oxford, MS	L 7–63
August 30	SEC	Marshall	Georgia	Sanford Stadium • Athens, GA	L 7–45
August 30	Big Ten	Old Dominion	Indiana	Memorial Stadium • Bloomington, IN	L 14–27
August 30	SEC	Mississippi State	Southern Miss	M. M. Roberts Stadium • Hattiesburg, MS	L 17–34
September 5	ACC	James Madison	Louisville	L&N Federal Credit Union Stadium • Louisville, KY	L 14–28
September 6	Big Ten	Georgia Southern	USC	Los Angeles Memorial Coliseum • Los Angeles, CA	L 20–59
September 6	SEC	Arkansas State	Arkansas	War Memorial Stadium • Fayetteville, AR	L 14–56
September 6	SEC	Louisiana–Monroe	Alabama	Bryant–Denny Stadium • Tuscaloosa, AL	L 0–73
September 6	ACC	Troy	Clemson	Memorial Stadium • Clemson, SC	L 16–27
September 13	ACC	Old Dominion	Virginia Tech	Lane Stadium • Blacksburg, VA	W 45–26
September 13	Big 12	Iowa State	Arkansas State	Centennial Bank Stadium • Jonesboro, AR	L 16–24
September 13	SEC	Louisiana	Missouri	Faurot Field • Columbia, MO	L 10–52
September 13	SEC	South Alabama	Auburn	Jordan-Hare Stadium • Auburn, AL	L 15–31
September 13	Big 12	Texas State	Arizona State	Mountain America Stadium • Tempe, AZ	L 15–34
September 20	SEC	Georgia State	Vanderbilt	FirstBank Stadium • Nashville, TN	L 21–70
October 4	Big Ten	Louisiana–Monroe	Northwestern	Martin Stadium • Evanston, IL	'L 7–42
November 22	SEC	Coastal Carolina	South Carolina	Williams–Brice Stadium • Columbia, SC	L 7–51

=== Sun Belt vs other FBS matchups ===
The following games include Sun Belt teams competing against teams from the American, C-USA, MAC, Mountain West, or Pac-12.

Date	Conference	Visitor	Home	Site	Score
August 29	American	Appalachian State	Charlotte	Bank of America Stadium • Charlotte, NC	W 34–11
August 30	Mountain West	Georgia Southern	Fresno State	Valley Children's Stadium • Fresno, CA	L 14–42
August 30	American	Rice	Louisiana	Cajun Field • Lafayette, LA	L 12–14
August 30	MAC	Eastern Michigan	Texas State	UFCU Stadium • San Marcos, TX	W 52–27
September 6	American	Memphis	Georgia State	Center Parc Stadium • Atlanta, GA	L 16–38
September 6	C-USA	Missouri State	Marshall	Joan C. Edwards Stadium • Huntington, WV	L 20–21
September 6	American	Tulane	South Alabama	Hancock Whitney Stadium • Mobile, AL	L 31–33
September 6	American	Texas State	UTSA	Alamodome • San Antonio, TX	W 43–36
September 13	American	East Carolina	Coastal Carolina	Brooks Stadium • Conway, SC	L 0–38
September 13	C-USA	Jacksonville State	Georgia Southern	Paulson Stadium • Statesboro, GA	W 41–34
September 13	American	Memphis	Troy	Veterans Memorial Stadium • Troy, AL	L 7–28
September 20	C-USA	James Madison	Liberty	Williams Stadium • Lynchburg, VA	W 31–13
September 20	C-USA	Marshall	Middle Tennessee	Johnny "Red" Floyd Stadium • Murfreesboro, TN	W 42–28
September 20	C-USA	Arkansas State	Kennesaw State	Fifth Third Stadium • Kennesaw, GA	L 21–28
September 20	MAC	Louisiana	Eastern Michigan	Rynearson Stadium • Ypsilanti, MI	L 31–34
September 20	C-USA	Louisiana–Monroe	UTEP	Sun Bowl • El Paso, TX	W 31–25
September 20	C-USA	Southern Miss	Louisiana Tech	Joe Aillet Stadium • Ruston, LA	L 20–30
September 20	MAC	Troy	Buffalo	UB Stadium • Buffalo, NY	W 21–17
September 27	Mountain West	Appalachian State	Boise State	Albertsons Stadium • Boise, ID	L 14–47
September 27	C-USA	Liberty	Old Dominion	S.B. Ballard Stadium • Norfolk, VA	W 21–7
September 27	American	South Alabama	North Texas	DATCU Stadium • Denton, TX	L 22–36
September 27	C-USA	Jacksonville State	Southern Miss	M. M. Roberts Stadium • Hattiesburg, MS	W 42–25
October 4	Pac-12	Oregon State	Appalachian State	Kidd Brewer Stadium • Boone, NC	W 27–23
November 22	Pac-12	Washington State	James Madison	Bridgeforth Stadium • Harrisonburg, VA	W 24–20

=== Sun Belt vs. FCS matchups ===
The following games include Sun Belt teams competing against FCS schools.

Date	Visitor	Home	Site	Score
August 28	Saint Francis (PA)	Louisiana–Monroe	Malone Stadium • Monroe, LA	W 29–0
August 30	Weber State	James Madison	Bridgeforth Stadium • Harrisonburg, VA	W 45–10
August 30	Southeast Missouri State	Arkansas State	Centennial Bank Stadium • Jonesboro, AR	W 42–24
August 30	Morgan State	South Alabama	Hancock Whitney Stadium • Mobile, AL	W 38–21
August 30	Nicholls	Troy	Veterans Memorial Stadium • Troy, AL	W 38–20
September 6	Lindenwood	Appalachian State	Kidd Brewer Stadium • Boone, NC	W 20–13
September 6	Charleston Southern	Coastal Carolina	Brooks Stadium • Conway, SC	W 13–0
September 6	North Carolina Central	Old Dominion	S.B. Ballard Stadium • Norfolk, VA	W 54–6
September 6	McNeese	Louisiana	Cajun Field • Lafayette, LA	W 34–10
September 6	Jackson State	Southern Miss	M. M. Roberts Stadium • Hattiesburg, MS	W 38–20
September 13	Murray State	Georgia State	Center Parc Stadium • Atlanta, GA	W 37–21
September 13	Eastern Kentucky	Marshall	Joan C. Edwards Stadium • Huntington, WV	W 38–7
September 20	Maine	Georgia Southern	Paulson Stadium • Statesboro, GA	W 45–17
September 20	Nicholls	Texas State	UFCU Stadium • San Marcos, TX	W 35–3

== Awards and honors ==
=== Player of the week honors ===
Week	Offensive			Defensive			Special Teams		
Week	Player	Team	Position	Player	Team	Position	Player	Team	Position
Week 1	AJ Swann	Appalachian State	QB	D'Arco Perkins-McCallister	Louisiana–Monroe	DB	Tony Sterner	Louisiana	K
Week 2	Trequan Jones	Old Dominion	RB	Luke Hodge	Troy	LB	Tre' Brown	Old Dominion	WR
Week 3	Colton Joseph	Old Dominion	QB	Ian Foster	Southern Miss	DB	Dalen Cobb	Georgia Southern	WR
Week 4	Carlos Del Rio-Wilson	Marshall	QB	Noah Arinze	Coastal Carolina	DL	Evan Crenshaw	Troy	P
Week 5	Lunch Winfield	Louisiana	QB	Trent Hendrick	James Madison	LB	Curtis Harris-Lopez	James Madison	RS
Week 6	Jaylen Raynor	Arkansas State	QB	Devin Lafayette	Troy	DB	Dominic De Freitas	Appalachian State	K
Week 7	Tucker Kilcrease	Troy	QB	Boogie Trotter	Marshall	DB	Paddy McAteer	Troy	K
Week 8	Alonza Barnett III	James Madison	QB	Treylin Payne	Texas State	LB	Lorcan Quinn	Marshall	K
Week 9	Braylon Braxton	Southern Miss	QB	Tirrell Johnson	South Alabama	LB	Clune Van Andel	Arkansas State	K
Week 10	Alonza Barnett III (2)	James Madison	QB	Demarcus Hendricks	Arkansas State	DL	Clune Van Andel (2)	Arkansas State	K
Week 11	JC French IV	Georgia Southern	QB	Josh Moten	Southern Miss	DB	Tripp Bryant	Georgia Southern	K
Week 12	OJ Arnold	Georgia Southern	RB	Kris Trinidad	Old Dominion	DL	Braeden McAlister	Georgia State	K
Week 13	Kentrel Bullock	South Alabama	RB	Drew Spinogatti	James Madison	LB	Ian Ratliff	Appalachian State	P
Week 14	Camden Brown	Georgia Southern	RB	Jaden Dugger	Louisiana	LB	Jordan Sample	Arkansas State	LB

=== Sun Belt individual awards ===
The following individuals received postseason honors as voted by the Sun Belt Conference football coaches at the end of the season.

Award	Player	School
Player of the Year	Alonza Barnett	James Madison
Offensive Player of the Year	Colton Joseph	Old Dominion
Defensive Player of the Year	Trent Hendrick	James Madison
Freshman Player of the Year	Sahir West	James Madison
Newcomer of the Year	Camden Brown	Georgia Southern
Coach of the Year	Bob Chesney	James Madison

=== All-Conference teams ===
The following players were selected as part of the Sun Belt's All-Conference Teams.

Position	Player	Team
First Team Offense
QB	Alonza Barnett	James Madison
RB	Wayne Knight	James Madison
RB	Kentrel Bullock	South Alabama
OL	Caleb Cook	Georgia Southern
OL	Pat McMurtrie	James Madison
OL	Jax Harrington	Louisiana
OL	Zach Barlev	Old Dominion
OL	Dorion Strawn	Texas State
TE	Toby Payne	Marshall
WR	Camden Brown	Georgia Southern
WR	Ted Hurst	Georgia State
WR	Beau Sparks	Texas State
First Team Defense
DL	Demarcus Hendricks	Arkansas State
DL	MJ Stroud	Georgia Southern
DL	J’Mond Tapp	Southern Miss
DL	Donnie Smith	Troy
LB	Trent Hendrick	James Madison
LB	Jaden Dugger	Louisiana
LB	Chris Jones	Southern Miss
LB	Jordan Stringer	Troy
DB	Boogie Trotter	Marshall
DB	Nehemiah Chandler	South Alabama
DB	Josh Moten	Southern Miss
DB	Devin Lafayette	Troy
First Team Specialists
K	Lorcan Quinn	Marshall
P	Evan Crenshaw	Troy
RS	Chauncy Cobb	Arkansas State
AP	Wayne Knight	James Madison

Position	Player	Team
Second Team Offense
QB	Colton Joseph	Old Dominion
RB	OJ Arnold	Georgia Southern
RB	Lincoln Pare	Texas State
OL	Pichon Wimbley	Georgia Southern
OL	Zach Greenberg	James Madison
OL	Riley Robell	James Madison
OL	Ryan Joyce	Old Dominion
OL	Eli Russ	Troy
TE	Ethan Conner	Troy
WR	Corey Rucker	Arkansas State
WR	Demarcus Lacey	Marshall
WR	Devin Voisin	South Alabama
Second Team Defense
DL	Cody Sigler	Arkansas State
DL	Immanuel Bush	James Madison
DL	Sahir West	James Madison
DL	Jordan Lawson	Louisiana
LB	Colton Phares	Appalachian State
LB	Blayne Myrick	South Alabama
LB	Treylin Payne	Texas State
DB	Xamarion Gordon	Coastal Carolina
DB	Justin Eaglin	James Madison
DB	Jacob Thomas	James Madison
DB	Jerome Carter	Old Dominion
DB	Jaquez White	Troy
Second Team Specialists
K	Tyler Robles	Texas State
P	Nathan Totten	Marshall
RS	Jaylen Jenkins	Texas State
AP	Beau Sparks	Texas State

Position	Player	Team
Third Team Offense
QB	Brad Jackson	Texas State
RB	Rashod Dubinion	Appalachian State
RB	Bill Davis	Louisiana
OL	Johnnie Brown III	Georgia Southern
OL	Carter Sweazie	James Madison
OL	Jalen Slappy	Marshall
OL	Kenton Jerido	South Alabama
OL	Matt Henry	Troy
TE	Izayah Cummings	Appalachian State
WR	Landon Ellis	James Madison
WR	Tre’ Brown III	Old Dominion
WR	Chris Dawn Jr.	Texas State
Third Team Defense
DL	Kevin Abrams-Verwyne	Appalachian State
DL	Ethan Hassler	Arkansas State
DL	Ezekiel Durham-Campbell	Coastal Carolina
DL	Aiden Gobaira	James Madison
DL	Kris Trinidad	Old Dominion
LB	Noah Flemmings	Louisiana–Monroe
LB	Jeremy Mack Jr.	Old Dominion
LB	Michael Montgomery	Southern Miss
DB	Ethan Johnson	Appalachian State
DB	DJ Barksdale	James Madison
DB	Elijah Culp	James Madison
DB	Ian Foster	Southern Miss
Third Team Specialists
K	Dominic De Freitas	Appalachian State
P	Alex Smith	Georgia Southern
RS	Dalen Cobb	Georgia Southern
AP	Chauncy Cobb	Arkansas State

=== All-Americans ===
Position	Player	School	Selector
First Team All-Americans
P	Evan Crenshaw	Troy	(FWAA, TSN)

Position	Player	School	Selector
Second Team All-Americans
AP / RS	Wayne Knight	James Madison	(AP, SI, USAT)
AP / RS	Jaylen Jenkins	Texas State	(TSN)

== NFL draft ==
The 2026 NFL draft will be held in Pittsburgh, Pennsylvania. The following list includes all Sun Belt players in the draft.

=== List of selections ===
Player	Position	School	Draft Round	Round Pick	Overall Pick	Team
Ted Hurst	WR	Georgia State	3	20	84	Tampa Bay Buccaneers
Jaden Dugger	LB	Louisiana	5	14	154	San Francisco 49ers
