= Jaden Dugger =

American football player (born 2004)

No. 53 – San Francisco 49ers
- Position: Linebacker
- Roster status: Active

Personal information
- Born: February 26, 2004 (age 22); Pittsburgh, Pennsylvania, U.S.
- Listed height: 6 ft 5 in (1.96 m)
- Listed weight: 242 lb (110 kg)

Career information
- High school: Penn Hills (Penn Hills, Pennsylvania)
- College: Georgetown (2022–2023); Louisiana (2024–2025)
- NFL draft: 2026: 5th round, 154th overall pick

Career history
- San Francisco 49ers (2026–present)

Awards and highlights
- First-team All-Sun Belt (2025)

Career NFL statistics as of Week 10, 2026
- Tackles: 37
- Sacks: 1.0
- Pass deflections: 1
- Interceptions: 1
- Defensive touchdowns: 1
- Stats at Pro Football Reference

Jaden Dugger (born February 26, 2004) is an American professional football linebacker for the San Francisco 49ers of the National Football League (NFL). He played college football for the Georgetown Hoyas and Louisiana Ragin' Cajuns. Dugger was selected by the 49ers in the fifth round of the 2026 NFL draft.

== Early life ==
Dugger was born on February 26, 2004, in Pittsburgh, Pennsylvania. He attended Penn Hills High School in Penn Hills, Pennsylvania. Coming out of high school, Dugger committed to play college football for the Georgetown Hoyas.

== College career ==
=== Georgetown ===
As a freshman in 2022, Dugger played in eight games, recording 17 tackles.

As a sophomore in 2023, Dugger had 43 tackles with four being for a loss, three sacks, two interceptions, and a forced fumble. He earned second-team all-Patriot honors. After the conclusion of the season, Dugger entered the NCAA transfer portal.

=== Louisiana ===
Dugger transferred to play for the Louisiana Ragin' Cajuns. In the 2024 season, he notched 37 tackles with four being for a loss. During Week 3 of the 2025 season, Dugger totaled 11 tackles with two going for a loss, and a sack in a loss against Missouri Tigers. He finished the 2025 season with 125 tackles with 13 going for a loss, four sacks, and an interception. Dugger earned first-team all-Sun Belt honors. After the conclusion of the season, he declared for the 2026 NFL draft, while also accepting an invite to participate in the 2026 East-West Shrine Bowl.

== Professional career ==
Pre-draft measurables
Height	Weight	Arm length	Hand span	Wingspan	40-yard dash	10-yard split	20-yard split	20-yard shuttle	Three-cone drill	Vertical jump	Broad jump	Bench press
6 ft 4 3/4 in (1.95 m)	242 lb (110 kg)	35 in (0.89 m)	9 5/8 in (0.24 m)	7 ft 0 3/8 in (2.14 m)	4.61 s	1.61 s	2.65 s	4.45 s	7.00 s	34.5 in (0.88 m)	10 ft 6 in (3.20 m)	17 reps
All values from Pro Day

Dugger was selected by the San Francisco 49ers in the fifth round (154th overall) of the 2026 NFL draft. On May 8, he signed his rookie deal with the 49ers.

During the season-opening 27–7 victory over the Los Angeles Rams in Australia, Dugger made his NFL debut and had five combined tackles (one solo). During a Week 5 32–29 road victory over the Seattle Seahawks, he recorded nine combined tackles (seven solo) and his first NFL sack on Sam Darnold. In the next game against the Washington Commanders on Monday Night Football, Dugger had a team-high 11 combined tackles (eight solo) during the 23–17 victory.

Following a Week 8 bye, the 49ers returned home to face the Las Vegas Raiders. Dugger finished the 38–17 victory with six solo tackles, a pass deflection, and his first NFL interception by picking off Kirk Cousins and returned it 35 yards for a touchdown.

== Personal life ==
Dugger is the brother of college football quarterback, Julian Dugger.
