= Zach Barlev =

Canadian gridiron football player (born 2001)

No. 63 – Ottawa Redblacks
- Position: Offensive lineman
- Roster status: Reserve
- CFL status: National

Personal information
- Born: June 23, 2003 (age 23)
- Listed height: 6 ft 4 in (1.93 m)
- Listed weight: 315 lb (143 kg)

Career information
- High school: Plainfield East (Plainfield, Illinois)
- College: Illinois (2021–2023); Old Dominion (2024–2025)
- NFL draft: 2026: undrafted

Career history
- Ottawa Redblacks (2026–present)

Awards and highlights
- First-team All-Sun Belt (2025); Third-team All-Sun Belt (2024)
- Stats at CFL.ca

Zachary Barlev (born June 23, 2003) is an American professional football offensive lineman for the Ottawa Redblacks of the Canadian Football League (CFL). He played college football for the Illinois Fighting Illini and Old Dominion Monarchs.

== Early life ==
Barlev was born on June 23, 2003. He attended Plainfield East High School in Plainfield, Illinois, where he played baseball, football, golf, track and field and wrestling.

== College career ==
Barlev played college football for the Illinois Fighting Illini from 2021 to 2023 and Old Dominion Monarchs from 2024 to 2025. He redshirted his first year and only played in one game in the nine-overtime victory at Penn State. The next two seasons, Barlev played in 25 games on special teams. On December 1, 2023, he entered the transfer portal.

On December 15, 2023, Barlev committed to Old Dominion University. In 2024, he started all 12 games, three at left guard and nine at left tackle, earning third-team All-Sun Belt honors. The following year, Barlev started all 13 games at left tackle and was named to the first-team All-Sun Belt team.

== Professional career ==
Pre-draft measurables
Height	Weight	Arm length	Hand span	Wingspan	40-yard dash	10-yard split	20-yard split	20-yard shuttle	Three-cone drill	Vertical jump	Broad jump	Bench press
6 ft 4 in (1.93 m)	315 lb (143 kg)	31 5/8 in (0.80 m)	9 in (0.23 m)	4 1/4 ft 6 5/8 in (1.46 m)	5.07 s	1.74 s	2.98 s	4.82 s	7.87 s	29 in (0.74 m)	9 ft 1 in (2.77 m)	27 reps
All values from Pro day

After going unselected in the 2026 NFL draft, Barlev signed with the Ottawa Redblacks of the Canadian Football League (CFL) as an undrafted free agent. On May 31, he was signed to the practice roster. On August 6, Barlev was elevated to the active roster and made his first CFL start on August 14 against the Winnipeg Blue Bombers at right tackle. On September 7, he was moved back to the practice roster. On September 16, Barlev was promoted again to the active roster. On October 15, he was moved to the reserve roster to recover from an arm injury.
