= Sahir West =

American football player

- West with UCLA in 2026

No. 15 – UCLA Bruins
- Position: Defensive lineman
- Class: Redshirt Sophomore

Personal information
- Listed height: 6 ft 3 in (1.91 m)
- Listed weight: 279 lb (127 kg)

Career information
- High school: Mount Saint Joseph (Baltimore, Maryland)
- College: James Madison (2024–2025); UCLA (2026–present)

Awards and highlights
- Sun Belt Freshman of the Year (2025); Second-team All-Sun Belt (2025)
- Stats at ESPN

Sahir West is an American college football defensive lineman for the UCLA Bruins. He previously played for the James Madison Dukes.

== Early life ==
West attended Mount Saint Joseph High School in Baltimore, Maryland. As a junior, he totaled 63 tackles, ten sacks, and an interception. Following his high school career, West committed to play college football at James Madison University.

== College career ==
West played sparingly in 2024, appearing in two games and earning a redshirt. His production increased the following season, recording ten tackles, 5.5 tackles for loss, and three sacks in the 2025 Sun Belt Conference Football Championship Game against Troy. At the conclusion of the regular season, West was named the Sun Belt Freshman of the Year and a first-team Freshman All-American by The Athletic.
