= Trent Hendrick =

American football player

- Hendrick in 2026

No. 34 – UCLA Bruins
- Position: Linebacker
- Class: Redshirt Senior

Personal information
- Listed height: 6 ft 0 in (1.83 m)
- Listed weight: 234 lb (106 kg)

Career information
- High school: St. Christopher's (Richmond, Virginia)
- College: James Madison (2022–2025); UCLA (2026–present)

Awards and highlights
- Sun Belt Defensive Player of the Year (2025); First-team All-Sun Belt (2025)
- Stats at ESPN

Trent Hendrick is an American football linebacker for the UCLA Bruins. He previously played for the James Madison Dukes.

== Early life ==
Hendrick attended St. Christopher's High School in Richmond, Virginia, and committed to play college football for the James Madison Dukes.

== College career ==
=== James Madison ===
In week 8 of the 2022 season, Hendrick notched six tackles with one for a loss against Marshall. During his first three seasons from 2022 to 2024, he played in 35 games with 18 starts, totaling 103 tackles including 12 for a loss, three sacks, two pass deflections, and a forced fumble. In week 4 of the 2025 season, Hendrick recorded 11 tackles with three for a loss, three sacks, a pass deflection, and a forced fumble in a victory over Georgia Southern. He finished the 2025 season with 106 tackles with seven for a loss, three sacks, three pass deflections, and two forced fumbles, earning first-team all-Sun Belt honors and Sun Belt Defensive Player of the Year honors. After the 2025 season, he entered the NCAA transfer portal.

=== UCLA ===
After being granted a fifth year of eligibility for the 2026 season, Hendrick transferred to play for the UCLA Bruins.
