= Battle of the Blue Ridge =

American college football rivalry

- James Madison Dukes Liberty Flames
- First meeting: October 11, 1980; James Madison, 30–14
- Latest meeting: September 5, 2026; James Madison, 20–13
- Next meeting: September 6, 2031
- Stadiums: Bridgeforth Stadium; Williams Stadium

Statistics
- Total meetings: 20
- All-time series: James Madison, 14–6
- Largest victory: James Madison, 48–6 (2003)
- Longest win streak: James Madison, 6 (2000–2011)
- Current win streak: James Madison, 2 (2025–present)

Locations of James Madison and Liberty

The Battle of the Blue Ridge is an American college football series between the Dukes of James Madison University and the Flames of Liberty University, two NCAA Division I Football Bowl Subdivision (FBS) programs located in the Blue Ridge Mountains region of the Commonwealth of Virginia. The rivalry began in 1980, and James Madison (JMU) leads the all-time series 14–6, as of their most recent meeting in 2026.

== History ==
=== 1980s ===
The rivalry began in 1980 when James Madison, in its first year as an NCAA Division I-AA (now FCS) program, scheduled Liberty Baptist College (now Liberty University), which was in its final year as a member of the National Association of Intercollegiate Athletics (NAIA). The Dukes would win the matchup 30–14 in Harrisonburg.

In 1981, Liberty left the NAIA and joined the NCAA as a Division II member. The Flames and Dukes would play one another this season as well, with the Dukes winning 36–14 in Lynchburg.

Liberty would remain a Division II program until 1987. During this period, The two schools would face each other an additional four times, with the matchups being split evenly at two wins for each school.

In 1988, Liberty would move up a division to Division I-AA, the same level as James Madison. The 1988 matchup between the two schools was the first where both were a member of the same football subdivision. James Madison would win that game, while Liberty would win the final match of the decade the following year in 1989.

=== 1990s ===
The Dukes and the Flames met only three times on the gridiron in the 1990s, all of which were in the beginning half of the decade. Liberty would take the decade series 2–1 over James Madison, with the road team winning all three matchups.

=== 2000s ===
During the 2000s, the schools met four times, with James Madison winning all the matchups. The rivalry saw its largest margin of victory when James Madison defeated Liberty by 42 points, 48-6, in Harrisonburg in 2003.

=== 2010s ===
During the 2010s, the rivalry remained quiet, with the schools playing one another an additional three times in the decade, two of which were scheduled in 2010 and 2011. James Madison would win both of the matchups, extending their win streak in the series to a record six consecutive victories.

The rivalry gained national attention in 2014, when Liberty upset No. 15 James Madison 26–21 in Harrisonburg during the first round of the FCS Playoffs. The victory marked Liberty’s first-ever postseason win and ended James Madison’s six-game winning streak in the series.

The matchup has been characterized as one of Virginia's biggest non-conference rivalries. Fox News wrote in March 2015 that it is "by far the biggest non-conference game of the season" and carries “Super Bowl-like” importance.

In 2018, after attempting and failing to receive an invite from the Sun Belt Conference. Liberty moved up from FCS to FBS after being granted a waiver to play as an independent.

=== 2020s ===
In 2022, James Madison joined Liberty in the FBS after accepting an invitation from the Sun Belt Conference. Liberty joined Conference USA from being an independent the following year.

In 2024, the schools announced that the series, which had been on hiatus since the FCS playoff game in 2014, would resume in 2025 with a matchup in Lynchburg, followed by a return in Harrisonburg in 2026.

Prior to the 2025 matchup, the schools announced that the rivalry would be called the Battle of the Blue Ridge and unveiled a trophy. After an eleven year hiatus the Dukes and Flames met on the field again on September 20. Despite the game being tied at halftime. The Dukes would take care of the Flames in the second half to win 31–13. As part of the 2025 season, the Dukes would go on and play Oregon in the College Football Playoff.

The 2026 game marked the beginning of the Billy Napier era at James Madison after previous coach Bob Chesney left to become the head coach of the UCLA Bruins. The contest was scheduled for a noon kickoff on ESPNU but was delayed by thunderstorms in Harrisonburg. After the weather cleared during pregame warm-ups, the Dukes were assessed an unsportsmanlike conduct penalty when defensive lineman Kells Bush intentionally ran into Liberty safety Izaiah Guy. The Dukes scored first and led 17–6 at halftime. Despite a late surge by the Flames, James Madison never relinquished the lead and won, 20–13.

=== Future matchups ===
Starting in the 2031 season, the Dukes and Flames will meet every season through 2040, with the exception of 2035.

== Game results ==
Liberty victories	James Madison victories

No.	Date	Location	Winner	Score
1	October 11, 1980	Harrisonburg	James Madison	30–14
2	September 26, 1981	Lynchburg	James Madison	36–14
3	September 24, 1983	Harrisonburg	James Madison	44–35
4	September 22, 1984	Lynchburg	James Madison	52–43
5	September 21, 1985	Harrisonburg	Liberty	9–3
6	September 20, 1986	Lynchburg	Liberty	17–7
7	November 8, 1988	Harrisonburg	James Madison	31–28
8	September 30, 1989	Lynchburg	Liberty	19–14
9	September 8, 1990	Harrisonburg	Liberty	22–19
10	November 2, 1991	Lynchburg	James Madison	35–34
11	November 7, 1992	Harrisonburg	Liberty	34–31
12	September 9, 2000	Harrisonburg	James Madison	38–7
13	November 23, 2001	Lynchburg	James Madison	14–7
14	August 30, 2003	Harrisonburg	James Madison	48–6
15	September 26, 2009	Lynchburg	James Madison	24–10
16	September 25, 2010	Harrisonburg	James Madison	10–3
17	September 17, 2011	Lynchburg	James Madison	27–24
18	*November 29, 2014	Harrisonburg	Liberty	26–21
19	September 20, 2025	Lynchburg	James Madison	31–13
20	September 5, 2026	Harrisonburg	James Madison	20–13
Series: James Madison leads 14–6

*FCS Playoff Game

== Coaching records ==
James Madison
Challace McMillin	4–0
Joe Purzycki	1–4
Rip Scherer	1–1
Mickey Matthews	6–0
Everett Withers	0–1
Bob Chesney	1–0
Billy Napier	1–0

Liberty
Tom Dowling	0–3
Morgan Hout	2–1
Sam Rutigliano	3–2
Ken Karcher	0–3
Danny Rocco	0–3
Turner Gill	1–0
Jamey Chadwell	0–2

== See also ==
- List of NCAA college football rivalry games
