= Jacob Thomas (American football) =

American football player (born 2004)

No. 29 – Minnesota Vikings
- Position: Safety
- Roster status: Active

Personal information
- Born: May 30, 2004 (age 22); Ashburn, Virginia, U.S.
- Listed height: 6 ft 1 in (1.85 m)
- Listed weight: 212 lb (96 kg)

Career information
- High school: Stone Bridge (Ashburn)
- College: James Madison (2022–2025)
- NFL draft: 2026: undrafted

Career history
- Minnesota Vikings (2026–present)

Awards and highlights
- Second-team All-Sun Belt (2025)

Career NFL statistics as of Week 10, 2026
- Total tackles: 10
- Stats at Pro Football Reference

Jacob Thomas (born May 30, 2004) is an American professional football safety for the Minnesota Vikings of the National Football League (NFL). He played college football for the James Madison Dukes and was signed by the Vikings as an undrafted free agent in 2026.

== Early life ==
Thomas attended Stone Bridge High School in Ashburn, Virginia and played high school football as a quarterback. He committed to play college football for the James Madison Dukes.

== College career ==
Thomas played for the Dukes for 4 seasons, from 2022 to 2025, winning the John David Kraus Memorial Award and being named to the Second Team All-Sun Belt team. Thomas would declare for the 2026 NFL Draft on January 6, 2026.

== Professional career ==
Pre-draft measurables
Height	Weight	Arm length	Hand span	Wingspan	40-yard dash	10-yard split	20-yard split	20-yard shuttle	Three-cone drill	Vertical jump	Broad jump	Bench press
6 ft 0 1/2 in (1.84 m)	215 lb (98 kg)	31 1/4 in (0.79 m)	9 1/4 in (0.23 m)	6 ft 5 1/4 in (1.96 m)	4.45 s	1.63 s	2.60 s	4.21 s	6.84 s	36.5 in (0.93 m)	10 ft 1 in (3.07 m)	15 reps
All values from Pro Day

Thomas was signed as an undrafted free agent by the Minnesota Vikings after the conclusion of the 2026 NFL draft.
