= 2025 Southern Miss Golden Eagles football team =

American college football season

2025 Southern Miss Golden Eagles football

New Orleans Bowl, L 16–27 vs. Western Kentucky
- Conference: Sun Belt Conference
- West Division
- Record: 7–6 (5–3 Sun Belt)
- Head coach: Charles Huff (1st season; regular season); Blake Anderson (bowl game)
- Offensive coordinator: Blake Anderson (3rd season)
- Offensive scheme: Spread
- Defensive coordinator: Jason Semore (1st season)
- Base defense: Multiple 4–2–5
- Home stadium: M. M. Roberts Stadium

2025 Sun Belt Conference football standings
| | Conf. | | | Overall |
| Team | W | | L | W | | L |
|---|---|---|---|---|---|---|
East Division
| No. 19 James Madison xy$^ | 8 | – | 0 | 12 | – | 2 |
| Old Dominion | 6 | – | 2 | 10 | – | 3 |
| Coastal Carolina | 5 | – | 3 | 6 | – | 7 |
| Georgia Southern | 4 | – | 4 | 7 | – | 6 |
| Marshall | 3 | – | 5 | 5 | – | 7 |
| Appalachian State | 2 | – | 6 | 5 | – | 8 |
| Georgia State | 0 | – | 8 | 1 | – | 11 |
West Division
| Troy xy | 6 | – | 2 | 8 | – | 6 |
| Southern Miss | 5 | – | 3 | 7 | – | 6 |
| Louisiana | 5 | – | 3 | 6 | – | 7 |
| Arkansas State | 5 | – | 3 | 7 | – | 6 |
| Texas State | 3 | – | 5 | 7 | – | 6 |
| South Alabama | 3 | – | 5 | 4 | – | 8 |
| Louisiana–Monroe | 1 | – | 7 | 3 | – | 9 |
Championship: James Madison 31, Troy 14
^ – College Football Playoff participant; $ – Conference champion; x – Division champion/co-champions; y – Championship game participant; Rankings from AP Poll

The 2025 Southern Miss Golden Eagles football team represented the University of Southern Mississippi in the Sun Belt Conference's West Division during the 2025 NCAA Division I FBS football season. The Golden Eagles were led by first-year head coach Charles Huff. The Golden Eagles played home games at M. M. Roberts Stadium, located in Hattiesburg, Mississippi.

== Offseason ==
=== Transfers ===
==== Outgoing ====
| Player | Position | Destination |
|---|---|---|
| Damion Miller | S | Alcorn State |
| Wil Saxton | OL | Arkansas State |
| Kenyon Clay | RB | Arkansas State |
| Ethan Crawford | QB | Arkansas State |
| Connor Gibbs | K | Auburn |
| Jalen Washington | RB | Central Arkansas |
| Wildrekus Johnson | CB | East Central CC |
| Micheal Caraway Jr. | DB | Florida |
| Caleb Moore | DL | Georgia Southern |
| Will James | DB | Houston |
| Vernorrius Chaney | DB | Jackson State |
| Jo Cryer | OL | McNeese |
| Dante Kelly | LB | Mississippi Valley State |
| Dakota Thomas | WR | Nevada |
| Klabron Pollard | OL | Nicholls |
| Drew Lawson | OL | North Alabama |
| Tanner Welch | OL | Northwest Mississippi CC |
| Kolbe Cage | LB | Northwestern State |
| Jack Tannehill | K | Samford |
| Tre'Mon Henry | DE | South Alabama |
| Zay Franks | DB | Southern |
| Silas Corder | QB | Southwest Mississippi CC |
| Ques McNeal | DB | Stephen F. Austin |
| Tiaquelin Mims | WR | Texas State |
| Alec Clark | P | Tulane |
| Justyn Reid | TE | Tulane |
| Armondous Cooley | DL | Tulane |
| Jordan Johnson | S | UT Martin |
| Larry Simmons | WR | Utah |
| Tate Rodemaker | QB | Western Carolina |
| Braxton Myers | DB | Western Kentucky |
| Javieon Butler | WR | Unknown |
| Ja'Len Sims | LB | Unknown |
| Desmyn Baker | LB | Unknown |
| Keyshawn Buckley | WR | Unknown |
| Arian Gregory | LB | Unknown |
| Ryder Burns | LS | Unknown |
| Jack Richardson | P | Unknown |
| Jalen Owens | DE | Unknown |
| Khalid Moore | DE | Unknown |
| Moses Gray | RB | Unknown |
| Jameer Lewis | DE | Withdrawn |
| Reed Jesiolowski | TE | Withdrawn |

==== Incoming ====
| Player | Position | Previous school |
|---|---|---|
| Christian Anderson | OL | Alabama A&M |
| J'Mond Tapp | DE | Arizona State |
| Jacobe Robinson | QB | Boston College |
| Josh Battle | S | Chattanooga |
| Malakai Murphy | DB | Colorado |
| Jez Janvier | OT | Eastern Michigan |
| Broderick Roman | IOL | Eastern Michigan |
| Dominick Hill | DB | Liberty |
| Guylijah Theodule | DB | Marshall |
| Braylon Braxton | QB | Marshall |
| Alec Clark | P | Marshall |
| Isaiah Gibson Sr. | DL | Marshall |
| Ian Foster | S | Marshall |
| J.J. Hawkins | DE | Marshall |
| Josh Moten | DB | Marshall |
| Elijah Metcalf | WR | Marshall |
| Chuck Montgomery | WR | Marshall |
| Ishmael Ibraheem | DB | Marshall |
| Bralon Brown | WR | Marshall |
| Ahmere Foster | S | Marshall |
| Jabari Ishmael | DE | Marshall |
| Tychaun Chapman | WR | Marshall |
| Corey Myrick | S | Marshall |
| MaLik Caswell | S | Marshall |
| Carl Chester | WR | Marshall |
| Mathis Haygood | LB | Marshall |
| Moses Gray | RB | Marshall |
| Anthony Richard | DB | Marshall |
| Hayes Creel | OL | McNeese |
| Luke Beard | LS | Mississippi State |
| Mason Clinton | DL | Mississippi State |
| Jeffery Pittman | RB | Mississippi State |
| Micah Davis | WR | Ole Miss |
| Matt Jones | RB | Ole Miss |
| Michael Montgomery | LB | Portland State |
| Cooper Frazier | OL | Samford |
| Aaryn Parks | OL | South Carolina |
| Carlos Slayden | IOL | Troy |
| Landry Lyddy | QB | UAB |
| Chase Malamala | OT | UCF |
| Aloali'i Maui | OL | Utah State |
| Robert Briggs Jr. | RB | Utah State |
| Grant Page | WR | Utah State |
| RJ Whitehead | OL | UTEP |
| Jaden McKinney | DL | UTEP |
| Quinzavious Warren | DL | UTEP |
| Jonathan Pennix | DB | Virginia Tech |
| Tory Johnson | WR | West Virginia |
| Zachariah Keith | DL | West Virginia |
| Elijah Kinsler | DL | West Virginia |
| Camden Myers | OL | Western Carolina |
| Kadinn Morris | TE | Western Michigan |

=== Coaching staff additions ===
| Name | New Position | Previous Team | Previous Position | Source |
|---|---|---|---|---|
| Charles Huff | Head coach | Marshall | Head coach | |
| Blake Anderson | Offensive coordinator/Quarterbacks | Utah State | Head coach | |
| Jason Semore | Defensive coordinator/Linebackers | Marshall | Defensive coordinator | |
| Dominique Bowman | Defensive backs | Temple | Cornerbacks | |
| Aaron Dobson | Wide receivers | Marshall | Wide receivers | |
| Telly Lockette | Running backs | Marshall | Run game coordinator/Running backs | |
| Taveze Calhoun | Cornerbacks | West Georgia | Cornerbacks | |
| Sean Coughlin | Offensive line | Eastern Michigan | Assistant head coach/Offensive line/Co-offensive run game coordinator | |
| Brandon Deaderick | Defensive line | Ole Miss | Analyst | |
| Joe Bolden | Special teams | Tulsa | Special teams/Co-defensive run game coordinator | |
| Dalton Williams | Tight ends | Texas | Offensive analyst | |

== Preseason ==
=== Media poll ===
In the Sun Belt preseason coaches' poll, the Golden Eagles were picked to finish fifth place in the West division.

Quarterback Braylon Braxton was named the Preseason Offensive Player of the Year and was named in the first team offense, along with defensive lineman Brodarius Lewis, defensive back Josh Moten and return specialist Ian Foster in the first team defense and special teams, respectively. Tight end Kyirin Heath was named in the second team offense.

== Schedule ==
| Date | Time | Opponent | Site | TV | Result | Attendance |
|---|---|---|---|---|---|---|
| August 30 | 11:00 a.m. | Mississippi State* | M. M. Roberts Stadium; Hattiesburg, MS | ESPN | L 17–34 | 33,485 |
| September 6 | 4:00 p.m. | No. 15 (FCS) Jackson State* | M. M. Roberts Stadium; Hattiesburg, MS | ESPN+ | W 38–20 | 32,011 |
| September 13 | 6:00 p.m. | Appalachian State | M. M. Roberts Stadium; Hattiesburg, MS | ESPN+ | W 38–22 | 24,534 |
| September 20 | 6:30 p.m. | at Louisiana Tech* | Joe Aillet Stadium; Ruston, LA (Rivalry in Dixie) | ESPN+ | L 20–30 | 17,108 |
| September 27 | 6:00 p.m. | Jacksonville State* | M. M. Roberts Stadium; Hattiesburg, MS | ESPN+ | W 42–25 | 25,034 |
| October 9 | 7:00 p.m. | at Georgia Southern | Paulson Stadium; Statesboro, GA | ESPN2 | W 38–35 | 20,032 |
| October 18 | 4:00 p.m. | at Louisiana | Cajun Field; Lafayette, LA | ESPN+ | W 22–10 | 21,047 |
| October 25 | 2:30 p.m. | Louisiana–Monroe^{†} | M. M. Roberts Stadium; Hattiesburg, MS | ESPN+ | W 49–21 | 27,111 |
| November 8 | 11:00 a.m. | at Arkansas State | Centennial Bank Stadium; Jonesboro, AR | ESPNU | W 27–21 | 15,441 |
| November 15 | 2:30 p.m. | Texas State | M. M. Roberts Stadium; Hattiesburg, MS | ESPN+ | L 14–41 | 27,223 |
| November 22 | 2:30 p.m. | at South Alabama | Hancock Whitney Stadium; Mobile, AL | ESPN+ | L 35–42 | 17,601 |
| November 29 | 2:30 p.m. | Troy | M. M. Roberts Stadium; Hattiesburg, MS | ESPN+ | L 18–28 | 25,987 |
| December 23 | 4:30 p.m. | vs. Western Kentucky* | Caesars Superdome; New Orleans, LA (New Orleans Bowl) | ESPN | L 16–27 | 16,693 |
*Non-conference game; ^{†}Homecoming; Rankings from AP Poll - Released prior to game; All times are in Central time

== Game summaries ==
=== Mississippi State ===
Mississippi State Bulldogs (0–0) at Southern Miss Golden Eagles (0–0) – Game summary

| Quarter | 1 | 2 | 3 | 4 | Total |
|---|---|---|---|---|---|
| Bulldogs | 10 | 3 | 21 | 0 | 34 |
| Golden Eagles | 3 | 7 | 0 | 7 | 17 |

at M. M. Roberts Stadium • Hattiesburg, MS

- Date: August 30
- Game time: 11:00 a.m.
- Game weather: Cloudy, 74 °F (23 °C)
- Game attendance: 33,485
- Referee: James Carter
- TV announcers (ESPN): Roy Philpott (play-by-play), Sam Acho (analyst), and Taylor Davis (sidelines)

Game information

First quarter

- (13:35) MSST - Seydou Traore 55-yard pass from Blake Shapen, Kyle Ferrie kick (Drive: 6 plays, 75 yards, 1:25; Mississippi State 7-0)
- (7:54) USM - Reed Harradine 43-yard field goal (Drive: 4 plays, 1 yard, 0:38; Mississippi State 7-3)
- (3:35) MSST - Kyle Ferrie 55-yard field goal (Drive: 10 plays, 38 yards, 4:19; Mississippi State 10-3)

Second quarter

- (13:35) USM - Micah Davis 3-yard pass from Braylon Braxton, Reed Harradine kick (Drive: 12 plays, 81 yards, 4:25; Tied 10-10)
- (0:03) MSST - Kyle Ferrie 30-yard field goal (Drive: 15 plays, 63 yards, 5:56; Mississippi State 13-10)

Third quarter

- (9:34) MSST - Fluff Bothwell 6-yard run, Kyle Ferrie kick (Drive: 8 plays, 66 yards, 3:10; Mississippi State 20-10)
- (4:57) MSST - Fluff Bothwell 1-yard run, Kyle Ferrie kick (Drive: 11 plays, 67 yards, 2:59; Mississippi State 27-10)
- (1:52) MSST - Davon Booth 3-yard run, Kyle Ferrie kick (Drive: 9 plays, 424 yards, 2:58; Mississippi State 34-10)

Fourth quarter

- (0:33) USM - TJ Johnson 7-yard pass from Braylon Braxton, Reed Harradine kick (Drive: 10 plays, 73 yards, 4:16; Mississippi State 34-17)

| Statistics | MSST | USM |
|---|---|---|
| First downs | 23 | 18 |
| Plays–yards | 79–465 | 74–301 |
| Rushes–yards | 42–188 | 35–104 |
| Passing yards | 277 | 199 |
| Passing: comp–att–int | 27–37–1 | 26–39–1 |
| Turnovers | 1 | 1 |
| Time of possession | 30:21 | 29:39 |

| Team | Category | Player | Statistics |
|---|---|---|---|
| Mississippi State | Passing | Blake Shapen | 26/34, 270 yards, TD, INT |
| Mississippi State | Rushing | Davon Booth | 16 carries, 79 yards, TD |
| Mississippi State | Receiving | Brenen Thompson | 7 receptions, 92 yards |
| Southern Miss | Passing | Braylon Braxton | 26/39, 199 yards, 2 TD, INT |
| Southern Miss | Rushing | Braylon Braxton | 12 carries, 58 yards |
| Southern Miss | Receiving | Jeffery Pittman | 6 receptions, 52 yards |

=== No. 15 (FCS) Jackson State ===
No. 15 (FCS) Jackson State Tigers (1–0) at Southern Miss Golden Eagles (0–1) – Game summary

| Quarter | 1 | 2 | 3 | 4 | Total |
|---|---|---|---|---|---|
| No. 15 (FCS) Tigers | 3 | 7 | 0 | 10 | 20 |
| Golden Eagles | 14 | 3 | 7 | 14 | 38 |

at M. M. Roberts Stadium • Hattiesburg, MS

- Date: September 6, 2025
- Game time: 4:00 PM CDT
- Game weather: Cloudy • Temperature: 87 °F (31 °C) • Wind: NW 7 mph
- Game attendance: 32,011
- Referee: Trennis Livingston
- TV announcers (ESPN+): Jason Baker (play-by-play) and Austin Davis (analyst)

Game information

First quarter

- (12:06) USM – Zach Ruffin 30-yard punt return, Reed Harradine kick (Drive: 6 plays, 13 yards, 2:54; Southern Miss 7–0)
- (4:45) JKST – Gerardo Baeza 46-yard field goal (Drive: 8 plays, 44 yards, 3:45; Southern Miss 7–3)
- (0:23) USM – Bralon Brown 8-yard pass from Braylon Braxton, Reed Harradine kick (Drive: 12 plays, 87 yards, 4:15; Southern Miss 14–3)

Second quarter

- (13:16) JKST – Emari Matthews 21-yard run, Gerardo Baeza kick (Drive: 5 plays, 75 yards, 2:07; Southern Miss 14–10)
- (10:44) USM – Reed Harradine 35-yard field goal (Drive: 7 plays, 58 yards, 2:32; Southern Miss 17–10)

Third quarter

- (5:29) USM – Micah Davis 15-yard pass from Braylon Braxton, Reed Harradine kick (Drive: 7 plays, 45 yards, 2:48; Southern Miss 24–10)

Fourth quarter

- (14:54) USM – Kadinn Morris 10-yard pass from Braylon Braxton, Reed Harradine kick (Drive: 11 plays, 65 yards, 3:51; Southern Miss 31–10)
- (13:24) JKST – Gerardo Baeza 40-yard field goal (Drive: 4 plays, 0 yards, 1:17; Southern Miss 31–13)
- (9:59) USM – Robert Briggs 15-yard run, Reed Harradine kick (Drive: 7 plays, 75 yards, 3:25; Southern Miss 38–13)
- (5:32) JKST – Ahmad Miller 8-yard run, Gerardo Baeza kick (Drive: 11 plays, 75 yards, 4:18; Southern Miss 38–20)

| Statistics | JKST | USM |
|---|---|---|
| First downs | 19 | 25 |
| Plays–yards | 70–322 | 68–363 |
| Rushes–yards | 42–191 | 36–139 |
| Passing yards | 131 | 224 |
| Passing: Comp–Att–Int | 14–28–2 | 22–32–0 |
| Turnovers | 2 | 0 |
| Time of possession | 31:15 | 28:45 |

| Team | Category | Player | Statistics |
|---|---|---|---|
| Jackson State | Passing | Jacobian Morgan | 14/27, 131 yards, INT |
| Jackson State | Rushing | Travis Terrell Jr. | 10 carries, 80 yards |
| Jackson State | Receiving | Nate Rembert | 4 receptions, 64 yards |
| Southern Miss | Passing | Braylon Braxton | 20/30, 214 yards, 3 TD |
| Southern Miss | Rushing | Jeffery Pittman | 10 carries, 71 yards |
| Southern Miss | Receiving | Bralon Brown | 3 receptions, 52 yards, TD |

=== Appalachian State ===
Appalachian State Mountaineers (2–0) at Southern Miss Golden Eagles (1–1) – Game summary

| Quarter | 1 | 2 | 3 | 4 | Total |
|---|---|---|---|---|---|
| Mountaineers | 7 | 0 | 7 | 8 | 22 |
| Golden Eagles | 7 | 10 | 7 | 14 | 38 |

at M. M. Roberts Stadium • Hattiesburg, MS

- Date: September 13, 2025
- Game time: 6:00 PM CDT
- Game weather: Sunny • Temperature: 89 °F (32 °C) • Wind: 3 mph
- Game attendance: 24,534
- Referee: Tim Barker
- TV announcers (ESPN+): Jason Baker (play-by-play) and Austin Davis (analyst)

Game information

First quarter

- (7:02) APP – Rashod Dubinion 2-yard run, Dominic De Freitas kick (Drive: 7 plays, 62 yards, 2:50; Appalachian State 7–0)
- (4:05) USM – Jeffery Pittman 5-yard run, Reed Harradine kick (Drive: 10 plays, 75 yards, 2:57; Tied 7–7)

Second quarter

- (14:09) USM – Reed Harradine 39-yard field goal (Drive: 9 plays, 52 yards, 3:42; Southern Miss 10–7)
- (10:40) USM – Ian Foster 99-yard interception return, Reed Harradine kick (Drive: 8 plays, 71 yards, 3:29; Southern Miss 17–7)

Third quarter

- (11:20) USM – Robert Briggs 8-yard pass form Braylon Braxton, Reed Harradine kick (Drive: 9 plays, 75 yards, 3:40; Southern Miss 24–7)
- (1:06) APP – Jaquari Lewis 10-yard run, Dominic De Freitas kick (Drive: 12 plays, 70 yards, 4:45; Southern Miss 24–14)

Fourth quarter

- (11:23) USM – Jeffery Pittman 9-yard run, Reed Harradine kick (Drive: 5 plays, 69 yards, 2:07; Southern Miss 31–14)
- (9:29) USM – Micah Davis 21-yard pass from Braylon Braxton, Reed Harradine kick (Drive: 3 plays, 61 yards, 0:54; Southern Miss 38–14)
- (0:51) APP – Jaden Barnes 3-yard pass from Billy Wiles, Jaquari Lewis two-point pass conversion (Drive: 9 plays, 70 yards, 3:19; Southern Miss 38–22)

| Statistics | APP | USM |
|---|---|---|
| First downs | 27 | 18 |
| Plays–yards | 90–470 | 56–389 |
| Rushes–yards | 38–95 | 25–110 |
| Passing yards | 375 | 279 |
| Passing: Comp–Att–Int | 31–52–3 | 22–31–1 |
| Turnovers | 3 | 1 |
| Time of possession | 36:36 | 23:24 |

| Team | Category | Player | Statistics |
|---|---|---|---|
| Appalachian State | Passing | AJ Swann | 15/23, 217 yards, 3 INT |
| Appalachian State | Rushing | Rashod Dubinion | 24 carries, 95 yards, TD |
| Appalachian State | Receiving | Jaden Barnes | 10 receptions, 132 yards, TD |
| Southern Miss | Passing | Braylon Braxton | 22/30, 279 yards, 2 TD, INT |
| Southern Miss | Rushing | Jeffery Pittman | 6 carries, 39 yards, 2 TD |
| Southern Miss | Receiving | Tychaun Chapman | 4 receptions, 112 yards |

=== at Louisiana Tech (Rivalry in Dixie) ===
Southern Miss Golden Eagles (2–1) at Louisiana Tech Bulldogs (2–1) – Game summary

| Quarter | 1 | 2 | 3 | 4 | Total |
|---|---|---|---|---|---|
| Golden Eagles | 10 | 0 | 3 | 7 | 20 |
| Bulldogs | 17 | 13 | 0 | 0 | 30 |

at Joe Aillet Stadium • Ruston, LA

- Date: September 20, 2025
- Game time: 6:30 PM CDT
- Game weather: Sunny • Temperature: 87 °F (31 °C)
- Game attendance: 17,108
- Referee: Tedd Pitts
- TV announcers (ESPN+): Malcolm Butler (play-by-play), Luke McCown (analyst) and Madison Kaufman (sideline)

Game information

First quarter

- (13:43) LT – Blake Baker 1-yard run, Drew Henderson kick (Drive: 2 plays, 73 yards, 0:34; Louisiana Tech 7–0)
- (12:15) USM – Kyirin Heath 30-yard pass from Braylon Braxton, Reed Harradine kick (Drive: 4 plays, 75 yards, 1:28; Tied 7–7)
- (8:10) LT – Drew Henderson 24-yard field goal (Drive: 9 plays, 69 yards, 4:05; Louisiana Tech 10–7)
- (3:29) USM – Reed Harradine 38-yard field goal (Drive: 10 plays, 55 yards, 4:41; Tied 10–10)
- (0:46) LT – Omiri Wiggins 3-yard run, Drew Henderson kick (Drive: 7 plays, 65 yards, 2:43; Louisiana Tech 17–10)

Second quarter

- (14:01) LT – Kolbe Fields 48-yard interception return, Drew Henderson PAT failed (Drive: 5 plays, 25 yards, 1:45; Louisiana Tech 23–10)
- (0:23) LT – Clay Thevenin 1-yard run, Drew Henderson kick (Drive: 14 plays, 80 yards, 6:05; Louisiana Tech 30–10)

Third quarter

- (0:58) USM – Reed Harradine 30-yard field goal (Drive: 7 plays, 52 yards, 1:58; Louisiana Tech 30–13)

Fourth quarter

- (0:22) USM – Davis Dalton 34-yard pass from Braylon Braxton, Reed Harradine kick (Drive: 9 plays, 80 yards, 1:28; Louisiana Tech 30–20)

| Statistics | USM | LT |
|---|---|---|
| First downs | 28 | 14 |
| Plays–yards | 82–514 | 59–339 |
| Rushes–yards | 35–122 | 38–101 |
| Passing yards | 392 | 238 |
| Passing: comp–att–int | 28–47–1 | 15–21–0 |
| Turnovers | 1 | 0 |
| Time of possession | 32:36 | 27:24 |

| Team | Category | Player | Statistics |
|---|---|---|---|
| Southern Miss | Passing | Braylon Braxton | 28/47, 392 yards, 2 TD, INT |
| Southern Miss | Rushing | Robert Briggs | 9 carries, 47 yards |
| Southern Miss | Receiving | Carl Chester | 4 receptions, 118 yards |
| Louisiana Tech | Passing | Blake Baker | 15/21, 238 yards |
| Louisiana Tech | Rushing | Omiri Wiggins | 12 carries, 49 yards, TD |
| Louisiana Tech | Receiving | Eli Finley | 6 receptions, 154 yards |

=== Jacksonville State ===
Jacksonville State Gamecocks (2–2) at Southern Miss Golden Eagles (2–2) – Game summary

| Quarter | 1 | 2 | 3 | 4 | Total |
|---|---|---|---|---|---|
| Gamecocks | 3 | 0 | 8 | 14 | 25 |
| Golden Eagles | 14 | 7 | 14 | 7 | 42 |

at M. M. Roberts Stadium • Hattiesburg, MS

- Date: September 27, 2025
- Game time: 6:00 p.m. CDT
- Game weather: Sunny • Temperature: 83 °F (28 °C) • Wind: 4 mph
- Game attendance: 25,034
- Referee: Reed Brotherton
- TV announcers (ESPN+): Jason Baker (play-by-play) and Austin Davis (analyst)

Game information

First quarter

- (11:14) USM – Jeffery Pittman 1-yard run, Creighton Wilbanks kick (Drive: 4 plays, 25 yards, 1:31; Southern Miss 7–0)
- (6:38) USM – Jeffery Pittman 3-yard run, Creighton Wilbanks kick (Drive: 4 plays, 80 yards, 1:17; Southern Miss 14–0)
- (0:45) JVST – Garrison Rippa 35-yard field goal (Drive: 15 plays, 57 yards, 5:53; Southern Miss 14–3)

Second quarter

- (0:05) USM – Braylon Braxton 6-yard run, Creighton Wilbanks kick (Drive: 11 plays, 48 yards, 1:50; Southern Miss 21–3)

Third quarter

- (5:52) USM – Kadinn Morris 6-yard pass from Braylon Braxton, Creighton Wilbanks kick (Drive: 7 plays, 67 yards, 3:30; Southern Miss 28–3)
- (4:33) JVST – Brock Rechsteiner 4-yard pass from Caden Creel, Caden Creel two-point conversion run (Drive: 3 plays, 75 yards, 1:19; Southern Miss 28–11)
- (1:55) USM – Carl Chester 13-yard pass from Braylon Braxton, Creighton Wilbanks kick (Drive: 6 plays, 75 yards, 2:38; Southern Miss 35–11)

Fourth quarter

- (7:23) JVST – Caden Creel 5-yard run, two-point conversion run attempt failed (Drive: 14 plays, 89 yards, 6:20; Southern Miss 35–17)
- (1:27) USM – Ian Foster 49-yard interception return, Creighton Wilbanks kick (Drive: 2 plays, -3 yards, 0:33; Southern Miss 42–17)
- (0:23) JVST – Cam Cook 8-yard run, Caden Creel two-point conversion run (Drive: 5 plays, 75 yards, 1:04; Southern Miss 42–25)

| Statistics | JVST | USM |
|---|---|---|
| First downs | 21 | 25 |
| Plays–yards | 79–390 | 72–377 |
| Rushes–yards | 54–262 | 50–225 |
| Passing yards | 128 | 152 |
| Passing: Comp–Att–Int | 13–25–2 | 13–22–0 |
| Turnovers | 4 | 1 |
| Time of possession | 30:58 | 29:02 |

| Team | Category | Player | Statistics |
|---|---|---|---|
| Jacksonville State | Passing | Caden Creel | 9/17, 109 yards, TD, 2 INT |
| Jacksonville State | Rushing | Caden Creel | 23 carries, 161 yards, TD |
| Jacksonville State | Receiving | Cam Cook | 4 receptions, 77 yards |
| Southern Miss | Passing | Braylon Braxton | 13/22, 152 yards, 2 TD |
| Southern Miss | Rushing | Jeffery Pittman | 18 carries, 80 yards, 2 TD |
| Southern Miss | Receiving | Tychaun Chapman | 1 reception, 43 yards |

=== at Georgia Southern ===
Southern Miss Golden Eagles (3–2) at Georgia Southern Eagles (2–3) – Game summary

| Quarter | 1 | 2 | 3 | 4 | Total |
|---|---|---|---|---|---|
| Golden Eagles | 7 | 21 | 7 | 3 | 38 |
| Eagles | 7 | 0 | 14 | 14 | 35 |

at Paulson Stadium • Statesboro, GA

- Date: October 9, 2025
- Game time: 7:00 p.m. CDT
- Game weather: Sunny • Temperature: 67 °F (19 °C)
- Game attendance: 20,032
- Referee: Ted Pitts
- TV announcers (ESPN2): Jay Alter (play-by-play) and Rocky Boiman (analyst)

Game information

First quarter

- (8:23) GASO – David Mbadinga 2-yard run, Tripp Bryant kick (Drive: 7 plays, 48 yards, 2:53; Georgia Southern 7–0)
- (4:42) USM – Tychaun Chapman 50-yard pass from Braylon Braxton, Creighton Wilbanks kick (Drive: 9 plays, 89 yards, 3:32; Tied 7–7)

Second quarter

- (14:56) USM – Jeffery Pittman 2-yard run, Creighton Wilbanks kick (Drive: 5 plays, 45 yards, 1:22; Southern Miss 14–7)
- (5:06) USM – Carl Chester 30-yard pass from Braylon Braxton, Creighton Wilbanks kick (Drive: 4 plays, 44 yards, 1:54; Southern Miss 21–7)
- (1:18) USM – Jeffery Pittman 2-yard run, Creighton Wilbanks kick (Drive: 9 plays, 75 yards, 2:07; Southern Miss 28–7)

Third quarter

- (7:03) GASO – JC French IV 5-yard run, Tripp Bryant kick (Drive: 12 plays, 87 yards, 5:45; Southern Miss 28–14)
- (4:24) USM – Matt Jones 3-yard run, Creighton Wilbanks kick (Drive: 8 plays, 75 yards, 2:39; Southern Miss 35–14)
- (1:19) GASO – Marcus Sanders Jr. 39-yard pass from JC French IV, Tripp Bryant kick (Drive: 8 plays, 75 yards, 3:05; Southern Miss 35–21)

Fourth quarter

- (10:24) USM – Creighton Wilbanks 42-yard field goal (Drive: 14 plays, 51 yards, 5:55; Southern Miss 38–21)
- (6:20) GASO – Camden Brown 26-yard pass from JC French IV, Tripp Bryant kick (Drive: 3 plays, 29 yards, 0:42; Southern Miss 38–28)
- (2:14) GASO – JC French IV 2-yard run, Tripp Bryant kick (Drive: 12 plays, 61 yards, 3:20; Southern Miss 38–35)

| Statistics | USM | GASO |
|---|---|---|
| First downs | 25 | 24 |
| Plays–yards | 76–421 | 77–395 |
| Rushes–yards | 48–184 | 34–82 |
| Passing yards | 237 | 313 |
| Passing: Comp–Att–Int | 19–28–0 | 24–43–3 |
| Turnovers | 1 | 3 |
| Time of possession | 30:57 | 29:03 |

| Team | Category | Player | Statistics |
|---|---|---|---|
| Southern Miss | Passing | Braylon Braxton | 19/28, 237 yards, 2 TD |
| Southern Miss | Rushing | Jeffery Pittman | 31 carries, 140 yards, 2 TD |
| Southern Miss | Receiving | Elijah Metcalf | 4 receptions, 62 yards |
| Georgia Southern | Passing | JC French IV | 24/43, 313 yards, 2 TD, 3 INT |
| Georgia Southern | Rushing | OJ Arnold | 13 carries, 56 yards |
| Georgia Southern | Receiving | Camden Brown | 12 receptions, 158 yards, TD |

=== at Louisiana ===
Southern Miss Golden Eagles (4–2) at Louisiana Ragin' Cajuns (2–4) – Game summary

| Quarter | 1 | 2 | 3 | 4 | Total |
|---|---|---|---|---|---|
| Golden Eagles | 0 | 13 | 7 | 2 | 22 |
| Ragin' Cajuns | 7 | 0 | 3 | 0 | 10 |

at Cajun Field • Lafayette, LA

- Date: October 18, 2025
- Game time: 4:00 p.m. CDT
- Game weather: Cloudy • Temperature: 79 °F (26 °C) • Wind: 10 mph
- Game attendance: 21,047
- Referee: Steven Robinson
- TV announcers (ESPN+): Dan McDonald (play-by-play), Eric Mouton (analyst) and Ben Schafer (sideline)

Game information

First quarter

- (3:21) LA – Lunch Winfield 3-yard run, Tony Sterner kick (Drive: 16 plays, 85 yards, 8:01; Louisiana 7–0)

Second quarter

- (7:42) USM – Matt Jones 1-yard run, Creighton Wilbanks kick (Drive: 3 plays, 37 yards, 0:47; Tied 7–7)
- (1:29) USM – Creighton Wilbanks 32-yard field goal (Drive: 10 plays, 66 yards, 2:55; Southern Miss 10–7)
- (0:00) USM – Creighton Wilbanks 52-yard field goal (Drive: 1 play, 0 yards, 0:03; Southern Miss 13–7)

Third quarter

- (9:35) LA – Tony Sterner 24-yard field goal (Drive: 10 plays, 77 yards, 5:21; Southern Miss 13–10)
- (3:40) USM – Micah Davis 98-yard pass from Braylon Braxton, Creighton Wilbanks kick (Drive: 3 plays, 94 yards, 0:58; Southern Miss 20–10)

Fourth quarter

- (3:43) USM – Team Safety (Drive: 4 plays, -7 yards, 1:06; Southern Miss 22–10)

| Statistics | USM | LA |
|---|---|---|
| First downs | 14 | 19 |
| Plays–yards | 59–371 | 75–356 |
| Rushes–yards | 41–133 | 48–221 |
| Passing yards | 238 | 135 |
| Passing: Comp–Att–Int | 13–18–1 | 14–27–2 |
| Turnovers | 2 | 3 |
| Time of possession | 24:29 | 35:31 |

| Team | Category | Player | Statistics |
|---|---|---|---|
| Southern Miss | Passing | Braylon Braxton | 13/18, 238 yards, TD, INT |
| Southern Miss | Rushing | Jeffery Pittman | 21 carries, 73 yards |
| Southern Miss | Receiving | Micah Davis | 3 receptions, 134 yards, TD |
| Louisiana | Passing | Lunch Winfield | 12/21, 112 yards, INT |
| Louisiana | Rushing | Lunch Winfield | 19 carries, 98 yards, TD |
| Louisiana | Receiving | Caden Jensen | 5 receptions, 45 yards |

=== Louisiana–Monroe ===
Louisiana–Monroe Warhawks (3–4) at Southern Miss Golden Eagles (5–2) – Game summary

| Quarter | 1 | 2 | 3 | 4 | Total |
|---|---|---|---|---|---|
| Warhawks | 7 | 7 | 0 | 7 | 21 |
| Golden Eagles | 7 | 14 | 14 | 14 | 49 |

at M. M. Roberts Stadium • Hattiesburg, MS

- Date: October 25, 2025
- Game time: 2:30 p.m. CST
- Game weather: Rain • Temperature: 76 °F (24 °C) • Wind: 6 mph
- Game attendance: 27,111
- Referee: Marshall Lewis
- TV announcers (ESPN+): Jason Baker (play-by-play) and Austin Davis (analyst)

Game information

First quarter

- (7:35) ULM – Tyler Griffin 4-yard pass from Landon Graves, Jacob Chambliss kick (Drive: 12 plays, 75 yards, 7:25; Louisiana–Monore 7–0)
- (5:13) USM – Matt Jones 4-yard run, Creighton Wilbanks kick (Drive: 8 plays, 69 yards, 2:18; Tied 7–7)

Second quarter

- (12:05) USM – Kyirin Heath 34-yard pass from Braylon Braxton, Creighton Wilbanks kick (Drive: 11 plays, 80 yards, 4:38; Southern Miss 14–7)
- (8:00) USM – Tychaun Chapman 39-yard pass from Braylon Braxton, Creighton Wilbanks kick (Drive: 4 plays, 75 yards, 1:44; Southern Miss 21–7)
- (2:47) ULM – Zach Palmer-Smith 21-yard run, Jacob Chambliss kick (Drive: 7 plays, 64 yards, 2:34; Southern Miss 21–14)

Third quarter

- (10:28) USM – Matt Jones 3-yard run, Creighton Wilbanks kick (Drive: 2 plays, 7 yards, 0:28; Southern Miss 28–14)
- (6:03) USM – Carl Chester 8-yard pass from Braylon Braxton, Creighton Wilbanks kick (Drive: 4 plays, 63 yards, 1:26; Southern Miss 35–14)

Fourth quarter

- (12:54) USM – Bralon Brown 24-yard pass from Braylon Braxton, Creighton Wilbanks kick (Drive: 6 plays, 68 yards, 1:41; Southern Miss 42–14)
- (6:23) ULM – Julian Nixon 2-yard run, Jacob Chambliss kick (Drive: 12 plays, 75 yards, 6:31; Southern Miss 42–21)
- (4:56) USM – Jaylin Carter 27-yard run, Creighton Wilbanks kick (Drive: 3 plays, 44 yards, 1:25; Southern Miss 49–21)

| Statistics | ULM | USM |
|---|---|---|
| First downs | 22 | 21 |
| Plays–yards | 66–312 | 61–445 |
| Rushes–yards | 40–209 | 38–197 |
| Passing yards | 103 | 248 |
| Passing: Comp–Att–Int | 12–26–2 | 18–23–0 |
| Turnovers | 3 | 0 |
| Time of possession | 34:57 | 25:03 |

| Team | Category | Player | Statistics |
|---|---|---|---|
| Louisiana–Monroe | Passing | Landon Graves | 12/26, 103 yards, TD, 2 INT |
| Louisiana–Monroe | Rushing | Zach Palmer-Smith | 11 carries, 111 yards, TD |
| Louisiana–Monroe | Receiving | Jonathan Bibbs | 1 reception, 34 yards |
| Southern Miss | Passing | Braylon Braxton | 18/23, 248 yards, 4 TD |
| Southern Miss | Rushing | Robert Briggs | 7 carries, 55 yards |
| Southern Miss | Receiving | Tychaun Chapman | 3 receptions, 83 yards, TD |

=== at Arkansas State ===
Southern Miss Golden Eagles (6-2) at Arkansas State Red Wolves (5-4) – Game summary

| Quarter | 1 | 2 | 3 | 4 | Total |
|---|---|---|---|---|---|
| Golden Eagles | 10 | 7 | 3 | 7 | 27 |
| Red Wolves | 7 | 0 | 0 | 14 | 21 |

at Centennial Bank Stadium • Jonesboro, AR

- Date: November 8, 2025
- Game time: 11:00 AM CST
- Game weather: Sunny • Temperature: 71 °F (22 °C) • Wind: NE 2 mph
- Game attendance: 15,441
- Referee: Scott Broadway
- TV announcers (ESPNU): Lowell Galindo (play-by-play), Aaron Murray (analyst), and Lauren Sisler (sideline)

Game information

First quarter

- (13:17) USM – Creighton Wilbanks 28-yard field goal (Drive: 5 plays, 15 yards, 1:36; Southern Miss 3–0)
- (11:02) ARST – Kenyon Clay 5-yard pass from Jaylen Raynor, Clune Van Andel kick (Drive: 6 plays, 75 yards, 2:15; Arkansas State 7–3)
- (3:43) USM – Landry Lyddy 7-yard run, Creighton Wilbanks kick (Drive: 5 plays, 55 yards, 1:56; Southern Miss 10–7)

Second quarter

- (14:04) USM – Elijah Metcalf 76-yard pass from Landry Lyddy, Creighton Wilbanks kick (Drive: 1 play, 76 yards, 0:12; Southern Miss 17–7)

Third quarter

- (2:05) USM – Creighton Wilbanks 37-yard field goal (Drive: 9 plays, 61 yards, 3:46; Southern Miss 20–7)

Fourth quarter

- (13:08) ARST – Tyler Little 6-yard pass from Josh Flowers, Clune Van Andel kick (Drive: 11 plays, 75 yards, 3:57; Southern Miss 20–14)
- (9:15) USM – Kyirin Heath 15-yard pass from Braylon Braxton, Creighton Wilbanks kick (Drive: 10 plays, 66 yards, 3:53; Southern Miss 27–14)
- (3:15) ARST – Jaylen Bonelli 3-yard pass from Jaylen Raynor, Clune Van Andel kick (Drive: 7 plays, 59 yards, 2:19; Southern Miss 27–21)

| Statistics | USM | ARST |
|---|---|---|
| First downs | 22 | 28 |
| Plays–yards | 77–528 | 87–456 |
| Rushes–yards | 42–172 | 34–119 |
| Passing yards | 356 | 337 |
| Passing: Comp–Att–Int | 24–35–2 | 38–53–5 |
| Turnovers | 2 | 6 |
| Time of possession | 29:45 | 30:15 |

| Team | Category | Player | Statistics |
|---|---|---|---|
| Southern Miss | Passing | Braylon Braxton | 20/29, 228 yards, TD, INT |
| Southern Miss | Rushing | Jeffery Pittman | 18 carries, 75 yards |
| Southern Miss | Receiving | Elijah Metcalf | 5 receptions, 143 yards, TD |
| Arkansas State | Passing | Jaylen Raynor | 37/48, 331 yards, 2 TD, 4 INT |
| Arkansas State | Rushing | Devin Spencer | 11 carries, 47 yards |
| Arkansas State | Receiving | Corey Rucker | 7 receptions, 123 yards |

=== Texas State ===
Texas State Bobcats (3–6) at Southern Miss Golden Eagles (7–2) – Game summary

| Quarter | 1 | 2 | 3 | 4 | Total |
|---|---|---|---|---|---|
| Bobcats | 10 | 17 | 0 | 14 | 41 |
| Golden Eagles | 0 | 0 | 7 | 7 | 14 |

at M. M. Roberts Stadium • Hattiesburg, MS

- Date: November 15, 2025
- Game time: 2:30 p.m. CDT
- Game weather: Sunny • Temperature: 75 °F (24 °C) • Wind: SW 5 mph
- Game attendance: 27,223
- Referee: Tim Barker
- TV announcers (ESPN+): Jason Baker (play-by-play) and Austin Davis (analyst)

Game information

First quarter

- (10:12) TXST – Tyler Robles 29-yard field goal (Drive: 12 plays, 69 yards, 4:48; Texas State 3–0)
- (2:16) TXST – Brad Jackson 3-yard run, Tyler Robles kick (Drive: 12 plays, 86 yards, 4:34; Texas State 10–0)

Second quarter

- (10:41) TXST – Tyler Robles 50-yard field goal (Drive: 12 plays, 55 yards, 4:29; Texas State 13–0)
- (6:03) TXST – Chris Dawn Jr. 82-yard pass from Brad Jackson, Tyler Robles kick (Drive: 3 plays, 86 yards, 1:20; Texas State 20–0)
- (1:06) TXST – Brad Jackson 4-yard run, Tyler Robles kick (Drive: 6 plays, 86 yards, 3:25; Texas State 27–0)

Third quarter

- (2:58) USM – Elijah Metcalf 4-yard pass from Landry Lyddy, Creighton Wilbanks kick (Drive: 11 plays, 51 yards, 4:11; Texas State 27–7)

Fourth quarter

- (12:32) TXST – Lincoln Pare 1-yard run, Tyler Robles kick (Drive: 12 plays, 75 yards, 5:26; Texas State 34–7)
- (7:45) TXST – Christopher Jones 100-yard interception, Tyler Robles kick (Texas State 41–7)
- (1:39) USM – Jeffery Pittman 2-yard run, Creighton Wilbanks kick (Drive: 10 plays, 75 yards, 2:50; Texas State 41–14)

| Statistics | TXST | USM |
|---|---|---|
| First downs | 25 | 20 |
| Plays–yards | 68–449 | 74–391 |
| Rushes–yards | 51–257 | 30–124 |
| Passing yards | 192 | 267 |
| Passing: Comp–Att–Int | 14–17–0 | 29–44–2 |
| Turnovers | 0 | 3 |
| Time of possession | 32:04 | 27:56 |

| Team | Category | Player | Statistics |
|---|---|---|---|
| Texas State | Passing | Brad Jackson | 14/17, 192 yards, TD |
| Texas State | Rushing | Lincoln Pare | 21 carries, 118 yards, TD |
| Texas State | Receiving | Chris Dawn Jr. | 5 receptions, 117 yards, TD |
| Southern Miss | Passing | Landry Lyddy | 29/44, 267 yards, TD, 2 INT |
| Southern Miss | Rushing | Jeffery Pittman | 11 carries, 54 yards, TD |
| Southern Miss | Receiving | Elijah Metcalf | 10 receptions, 116 yards, TD |

=== at South Alabama ===
Southern Miss Golden Eagles (7–3) at South Alabama Jaguars (3–7) – Game summary

| Quarter | 1 | 2 | 3 | 4 | Total |
|---|---|---|---|---|---|
| Golden Eagles | 0 | 7 | 7 | 21 | 35 |
| Jaguars | 7 | 14 | 14 | 7 | 42 |

at Hancock Whitney Stadium • Mobile, AL

- Date: November 22, 2025
- Game time: 2:30 p.m. CDT
- Game weather: Cloudy • Temperature: 79 °F (26 °C) • Wind: E 8 mph
- Game attendance: 17,601
- Referee: Ted Pitts
- TV announcers (ESPN+): Pat Greenwood (play-by-play) and Brian Genard (analyst)

Game information

First quarter

- (0:56) USA – Keenan Phillips 13-yard run, Davis Little kick (Drive: 7 plays, 58 yards, 3:42; South Alabama 7–0)

Second quarter

- (11:15) USA – Kentrel Bullock 15-yard run, Davis Little kick (Drive: 7 plays, 63 yards, 3:36; South Alabama 14–0)
- (6:28) USM – Carl Chester 52-yard pass from Braylon Braxton, Creighton Wilbanks kick (Drive: 1 play, 52 yards, 0:09; South Alabama 14–7)
- (2:28) USA – Kentrel Bullock 26-yard run, Davis Little kick (Drive: 8 plays, 75 yards, 4:00; South Alabama 21–7)

Third quarter

- (14:15) USA – Bishop Davenport 1-yard run, Davis Little kick (Drive: 2 plays, 1 yard, 0:36; South Alabama 28–7)
- (9:20) USA – Bishop Davenport 7-yard run, Davis Little kick (Drive: 8 plays, 58 yards, 3:14; South Alabama 35–7)
- (3:04) USM – Jeffery Pittman 1-yard run, Creighton Wilbanks kick (Drive: 17 plays, 75 yards, 6:16; South Alabama 35–14)

Fourth quarter

- (8:32) USM – Carl Chester 11-yard pass from Braylon Braxton, Creighton Wilbanks kick (Drive: 8 plays, 63 yards, 2:12; South Alabama 35–21)
- (7:25) USA – Kentrel Bullock 64-yard run, Davis Little kick (Drive: 2 plays, 75 yards, 1:07; South Alabama 42–21)
- (6:35) USM – Micah Davis 29-yard pass from Braylon Braxton, Creighton Wilbanks kick (Drive: 4 plays, 75 yards, 0:50; South Alabama 42–28)
- (0:54) USM – Jaylin Carter 1-yard run, Creighton Wilbanks kick (Drive: 12 plays, 94 yards, 1:55; South Alabama 42–35)

| Statistics | USM | USA |
|---|---|---|
| First downs | 24 | 26 |
| Plays–yards | 75–441 | 78–449 |
| Rushes–yards | 23–41 | 52–263 |
| Passing yards | 400 | 186 |
| Passing: Comp–Att–Int | 31–52–1 | 23–26–0 |
| Turnovers | 1 | 0 |
| Time of possession | 22:43 | 37:17 |

| Team | Category | Player | Statistics |
|---|---|---|---|
| Southern Miss | Passing | Braylon Braxton | 31/52, 400 yards, 3 TD, INT |
| Southern Miss | Rushing | Jeffery Pittman | 12 carries, 41 yards, TD |
| Southern Miss | Receiving | Carl Chester | 5 receptions, 128 yards, 2 TD |
| South Alabama | Passing | Bishop Davenport | 20/23, 151 yards |
| South Alabama | Rushing | Kentrel Bullock | 23 carries, 187 yards, 3 TD |
| South Alabama | Receiving | Jeremy Scott | 4 receptions, 41 yards |

=== Troy ===
Troy Trojans (7–4) at Southern Miss Golden Eagles (7–4) – Game summary

| Quarter | 1 | 2 | 3 | 4 | Total |
|---|---|---|---|---|---|
| Trojans | 0 | 14 | 0 | 14 | 28 |
| Golden Eagles | 0 | 3 | 7 | 8 | 18 |

at M. M. Roberts Stadium • Hattiesburg, MS

- Date: November 29, 2025
- Game time: 2:30 p.m. CDT
- Game weather: Sunny
- Game attendance: 25,987
- Referee: Tim Barker
- TV announcers (ESPN+): Jason Baker (play-by-play) and Austin Davis (analyst)

Game information

First quarter

- No scoring plays.

Second quarter

- (10:02) TROY – Tae Meadows 3-yard run, Scott Taylor Renfroe kick (Drive: 13 plays, 80 yards, 5:07; Troy 7–0)
- (5:42) USM – Creighton Wilbanks 27-yard field goal (Drive: 4 plays, 4 yards, 1:39; Troy 7–3)
- (0:18) TROY – Peyton Higgins 16-yard pass from Goose Crowder, Scott Taylor Renfroe kick (Drive: 13 plays, 75 yards, 5:24; Troy 14–3)

Third quarter

- (2:46) USM – Kadinn Morris 0-yard run, Creighton Wilbanks kick (Drive: 6 plays, 57 yards, 2:25; Troy 14–10)

Fourth quarter

- (6:58) TROY – RaRa Thomas 7-yard pass from Goose Crowder, Scott Taylor Renfroe kick (Drive: 11 plays, 85 yards, 5:07; Troy 21–10)
- (3:27) USM – Carl Chester 10-yard pass from Braylon Braxton, Micah Davis two-point conversion pass from Braylon Braxton (Drive: 9 plays, 75 yards, 3:31; Troy 21–18)
- (3:16) TROY – RaRa Thomas 75-yard pass from Goose Crowder, Scott Taylor Renfroe kick (Drive: 1 play, 75 yards, 0:11; Troy 28–18)

| Statistics | TROY | USM |
|---|---|---|
| First downs | 22 | 20 |
| Plays–yards | 73–428 | 66–304 |
| Rushes–yards | 38–132 | 31–95 |
| Passing yards | 296 | 209 |
| Passing: Comp–Att–Int | 25–35–1 | 20–35–1 |
| Turnovers | 1 | 1 |
| Time of possession | 32:30 | 27:30 |

| Team | Category | Player | Statistics |
|---|---|---|---|
| Troy | Passing | Goose Crowder | 24/34, 285 yards, 3 TD, INT |
| Troy | Rushing | Tae Meadows | 21 carries, 94 yards, TD |
| Troy | Receiving | RaRa Thomas | 5 receptions, 118 yards, 2 TD |
| Southern Miss | Passing | Braylon Braxton | 20/35, 209 yards, TD, INT |
| Southern Miss | Rushing | Jeffery Pittman | 10 carries, 51 yards |
| Southern Miss | Receiving | Carl Chester | 4 receptions, 76 yards, TD |

=== vs. Western Kentucky (New Orleans Bowl) ===
2025 New Orleans Bowl
Western Kentucky Hilltoppers (8-4) vs. Southern Miss Golden Eagles (7-5) – Game summary

| Quarter | 1 | 2 | 3 | 4 | Total |
|---|---|---|---|---|---|
| Hilltoppers | 3 | 3 | 7 | 14 | 27 |
| Golden Eagles | 7 | 6 | 3 | 0 | 16 |

at Caesars Superdome • New Orleans, LA

- Date: December 23
- Game time: 4:30 p.m. CST
- Game weather: Indoor (N/A)
- Game attendance: 16,693
- Referee: Christian Watson
- TV announcers (ESPN): Courtney Lyle (play-by-play), Rene Ingoglia (analyst) and Ian Fitzsimmons (sideline)

Game information

First quarter

- (11:38) WKU – John Cannon 31-yard field goal (Drive: 4 plays, -1 yards, 1:16; Western Kentucky 3–0)
- (4:06) USM – Tychaun Chapman 35-yard pass from Braylon Braxton, Creighton Wilbanks kick (Drive: 4 plays, 62 yards, 1:22; Southern Miss 7–3)

Second quarter

- (11:09) WKU – John Cannon 30-yard field goal (Drive: 8 plays, 31 yards, 3:08; Southern Miss 7–6)
- (3:10) USM – Creighton Wilbanks 25-yard field goal (Drive: 7 plays, 16 yards, 2:11; Southern Miss 10–6)
- (0:00) USM – Creighton Wilbanks 29-yard field goal (Drive: 10 plays, 57 yards, 1:10; Southern Miss 13–6)

Third quarter

- (6:57) WKU – Maverick McIvor 11-yard run, John Cannon kick (Drive: 8 plays, 65 yards, 4:24; Tied 13–13)
- (1:36) SMU – Creighton Wilbanks 41-yard field goal (Drive: 9 plays, 44 yards, 3:15; Southern Miss 16–13)

Fourth quarter

- (7:51) WKU – George Hart III 1-yard run, John Cannon kick (Drive: 11 plays, 65 yards, 5:12; Western Kentucky 20–16)
- (3:38) WKU – Marvis Parrish 54-yard run, John Cannon kick (Drive: 7 plays, 83 yards, 2:39; Western Kentucky 27–16)

| Statistics | WKU | USM |
|---|---|---|
| First downs | 18 | 21 |
| Plays–yards | 73–422 | 84–377 |
| Rushes–yards | 33–155 | 36–119 |
| Passing yards | 267 | 258 |
| Passing: Comp–Att–Int | 22–40–2 | 24–48–1 |
| Turnovers | 3 | 1 |
| Time of possession | 31:24 | 28:36 |

| Team | Category | Player | Statistics |
|---|---|---|---|
| Western Kentucky | Passing | Maverick McIvor | 12/19, 199 yards, INT |
| Western Kentucky | Rushing | Marvis Parrish | 7 carries, 65 yards, TD |
| Western Kentucky | Receiving | Matthew Henry | 7 receptions, 126 yards |
| Southern Miss | Passing | Braylon Braxton | 24/47, 258 yards, TD, INT |
| Southern Miss | Rushing | Jeffery Pittman | 10 carries, 55 yards |
| Southern Miss | Receiving | Tychaun Chapman | 3 receptions, 50 yards, TD |
