= 2025 South Alabama Jaguars football team =

American college football season

2025 South Alabama Jaguars football
- Conference: Sun Belt Conference
- West Division
- Record: 4–8 (3–5 Sun Belt)
- Head coach: Major Applewhite (2nd season)
- Offensive coordinator: Paul Petrino (1st season)
- Offensive scheme: Multiple spread
- Defensive coordinator: Will Windham (2nd season)
- Co-defensive coordinator: Jason Washington (1st season)
- Base defense: Multiple 4–2–5
- Home stadium: Hancock Whitney Stadium

2025 Sun Belt Conference football standings
	Conf.			Overall
Team	W		L	W		L
East Division
No. 19 James Madison xy$^	8	–	0	12	–	2
Old Dominion	6	–	2	10	–	3
Coastal Carolina	5	–	3	6	–	7
Georgia Southern	4	–	4	7	–	6
Marshall	3	–	5	5	–	7
Appalachian State	2	–	6	5	–	8
Georgia State	0	–	8	1	–	11
West Division
Troy xy	6	–	2	8	–	6
Southern Miss	5	–	3	7	–	6
Louisiana	5	–	3	6	–	7
Arkansas State	5	–	3	7	–	6
Texas State	3	–	5	7	–	6
South Alabama	3	–	5	4	–	8
Louisiana–Monroe	1	–	7	3	–	9
Championship: James Madison 31, Troy 14
^ – College Football Playoff participant; $ – Conference champion; x – Division champion/co-champions; y – Championship game participant; Rankings from AP Poll

The 2025 South Alabama Jaguars football team represented the University of South Alabama as a member of the Sun Belt Conference during the 2025 NCAA Division I FBS football season. They were led by second-year head coach Major Applewhite and played their home games at Hancock Whitney Stadium in Mobile, Alabama.

== Preseason ==
=== Media poll ===
In the Sun Belt preseason coaches' poll, the Jaguars were picked to finish fourth place in the West division.

Linebacker Blayne Myrick was named the Preseason Defensive Player of the Year. Running back Kentrel Bullock and linebacker Blayne Myrick were awarded to be in the preseason All-Sun Belt first team offense and defense, respectively. Offensive lineman Jordan Davis, defensive back Wesley Miller and punter Aleksi Pulkkinen were named to the second team offense, defense and special teams.

== Schedule ==
The football schedule was announced on February 28, 2025.

Date	Time	Opponent	Site	TV	Result	Attendance
August 30	6:00 p.m.	Morgan State*	Hancock Whitney Stadium; Mobile, AL	ESPN+	W 38–21	14,017
September 6	6:00 p.m.	Tulane*	Hancock Whitney Stadium; Mobile, AL	ESPN+	L 31–33	16,871
September 13	11:45 a.m.	at No. 24 Auburn*	Jordan–Hare Stadium; Auburn, AL	SECN	L 15–31	88,043
September 20	6:00 p.m.	Coastal Carolina	Hancock Whitney Stadium; Mobile, AL	ESPN+	L 20–38	17,050
September 27	11:00 a.m.	at North Texas*	DATCU Stadium; Denton, TX	ESPNU	L 22–36	16,575
October 4	6:00 p.m.	at Troy	Veterans Memorial Stadium; Troy, AL (rivalry)	ESPN+	L 24–31 ^{OT}	28,035
October 14	6:30 p.m.	Arkansas State	Hancock Whitney Stadium; Mobile, AL	ESPN2	L 14–15	19,634
October 23	6:30 p.m.	at Georgia State	Center Parc Stadium; Atlanta, GA	ESPN2	W 38–31	13,673
November 1	2:30 p.m.	Louisiana^{†}	Hancock Whitney Stadium; Mobile, AL	ESPN+	L 22–31	18,462
November 15	2:30 p.m.	at Louisiana–Monroe	Malone Stadium; Monroe, LA	ESPN+	W 26–14	19,872
November 22	2:30 p.m.	Southern Miss	Hancock Whitney Stadium; Mobile, AL	ESPN+	W 42–35	17,601
November 29	2:00 p.m.	at Texas State	Bobcat Stadium; San Marcos, TX	ESPN+	L 26–49	16,169
*Non-conference game; ^{†}Homecoming; Rankings from AP Poll and CFP Rankings released prior to game; All times are in Central time

== Personnel ==
=== Transfers ===
Outgoing
Player	Position	New school
Jordan Scruggs	CB	West Virginia
Fluff Bothwell	RB	Mississippi State
Laith Marjan	K	Kansas
Emauri Sibley	LB	McNeese
Rickey Hyatt	S	Ohio
Brian Dillard	CB	Withdrawn
Jacob Jones	QB	Missouri Baptist
Jordan Buchanan	CB	UNLV
Braylon McReynolds	RB	Louisiana–Monroe
Jordan Norman	EDGE	Tulane
Amarion Fortenberry	CB	Kansas State
Jayden Hobson	OT	Alabama
Shamar Sandgren	WR	Chattanooga
Jarvis Durr	RB	Northwest Mississippi CC
Gavin Forsha	LB	Tennessee State
Gio Lopez	QB	North Carolina
Malachi Carney	OT	Georgia Tech
Hayden Dozier	OL	Itawamba CC
Ricky Fletcher	CB	Ole Miss
Julien Demby	LB	Itawamba CC
Lorenzo Smith	S	New Mexico State
Will Loerzel	TE	Wake Forest
Aakil Washington	EDGE	SMU
R.J. Moss	EDGE	Unknown
Jordan Davis	OT	Withdrawn
Jalyn Durgan	EDGE	North Texas
Lardarius Webb Jr.	S	Wake Forest
Reed Buys	OT	Unknown
Eli Webb	DL	West Florida

Incoming
Player	Position	Previous school
Amaury Wiggins	IOL	Arkansas
Leavy Johnson	IOL	Western Kentucky
Miller McCrumby	TE	Arkansas State
Jayvon Henderson	CB	East Tennessee State
Tremon "Trey" Henry	LB	Southern Miss
Tywon Wray Jr.	S	Oklahoma State
Brendan Jenkins	WR	Samford
Anthony Brown	S	Purdue
Caleb Dozier	LB	Georgia Tech
Tirrell Johnson	EDGE	Harding
Dallas Young	CB	Arkansas
Nigajuan "Ni" Mansell	IOL	South Carolina
Greg Johnson	CB	Navy
Nehemiah Chandler	CB	Georgia Tech
Emmanuel Waller	EDGE	UAB
Jaylen Booker	OT	Bethune Cookman
Zach Pyron	QB	Minnesota
Stephen Johnson	DL	McNeese
IBK Mafe	EDGE	St. Thomas
Brayden Ramey	OT	Florida Atlantic
Trae'von Dunbar	RB	West Virginia
Reese Osei-Wusu	OL	Lamar
Nathaniel Forystek	TE	North Dakota State
Saivion Kenon	CB	Coffeyville CC
David Houston III	S	Butler CC
Micah McKay	S	Millsaps
Jamal Siler	OL	Jacksonville State
James Whatley	K/P	Georgia Tech

=== Recruiting class ===
College recruiting (2025)
Name	Hometown	School	Height	Weight	40^{‡}	Commit date
Kearius Bivens; OL	Chatom, AL	Washington County HS	6 ft 7 in (2.01 m)	305 lb (138 kg)	–	Dec 4, 2024
Kearius Bivens; OL	Recruit ratings: 247Sports:					
Kohl Bradley; DB	Lucedale, MS	George County HS	6 ft 0 in (1.83 m)	170 lb (77 kg)	–	Jul 30, 2024
Kohl Bradley; DB	Recruit ratings: Rivals: 247Sports: ESPN: (74)					
Anthony Brown; S	Milan, TN	Milan HS; Purdue	6 ft 0 in (1.83 m)	195 lb (88 kg)	–	
Anthony Brown; S	Recruit ratings: No ratings found					
Caleb Dozier; LB	Dothan, AL	Headland HS; Georgia Tech	6 ft 2 in (1.88 m)	225 lb (102 kg)	–	
Caleb Dozier; LB	Recruit ratings: 247Sports:					
Antonio Gibbs; OT	Mobile, AL	LeFlore Magnet HS	6 ft 4 in (1.93 m)	265 lb (120 kg)	–	Jun 16, 2024
Antonio Gibbs; OT	Recruit ratings: Rivals: 247Sports:					
Jayvon Henderson; CB	Auburn, GA	Mill Creek HS; East Tennessee State	5 ft 10 in (1.78 m)	189 lb (86 kg)	–	
Jayvon Henderson; CB	Recruit ratings: No ratings found					
Tre'Mon Henry; LB	Columbus, GA	Eufaula HS; Southern Miss	6 ft 2 in (1.88 m)	245 lb (111 kg)	–	
Tre'Mon Henry; LB	Recruit ratings: 247Sports:					
Keeson Hines-Wheeler; LB	Fort Walton Beach, FL	Choctawhatchee HS	6 ft 1 in (1.85 m)	185 lb (84 kg)	–	Jul 6, 2024
Keeson Hines-Wheeler; LB	Recruit ratings: Rivals: 247Sports: ESPN: (77)					
Byron Jackson; OLB	Greensboro, FL	Gadsden County HS	6 ft 3 in (1.91 m)	215 lb (98 kg)	–	Apr 22, 2024
Byron Jackson; OLB	Recruit ratings: Rivals: 247Sports: ESPN: (74)					
Brendan Jenkins; WR	Hoschton, GA	Mill Creek HS; Samford	6 ft 1 in (1.85 m)	200 lb (91 kg)	–	
Brendan Jenkins; WR	Recruit ratings: 247Sports:					
Leavy Johnson; OL	Panama City, FL	Bay HS; Western Kentucky	6 ft 3 in (1.91 m)	292 lb (132 kg)	–	
Leavy Johnson; OL	Recruit ratings: No ratings found					
Tirrell Johnson; DE	Wynne, AR	Wynne HS; Harding	6 ft 2 in (1.88 m)	250 lb (110 kg)	–	
Tirrell Johnson; DE	Recruit ratings: No ratings found					
Julyon Jordan; RB	Guntersville, AL	Guntersville HS	5 ft 11 in (1.80 m)	175 lb (79 kg)	–	Jul 22, 2024
Julyon Jordan; RB	Recruit ratings: Rivals: 247Sports: ESPN: (73)					
Brec Long; TE	Copan, OK	Sedan HS; Coffeyville CC	6 ft 4 in (1.93 m)	230 lb (100 kg)	–	Dec 3, 2024
Brec Long; TE	Recruit ratings: Rivals: 247Sports:					
Maddox Lynch; TE	Vicksburg, MS	Warren Central HS	6 ft 4 in (1.93 m)	230 lb (100 kg)	–	Dec 16, 2024
Maddox Lynch; TE	Recruit ratings: 247Sports:					
Nigajuan Mansell; OL	Anderson, SC	Westside HS; South Carolina	6 ft 3 in (1.91 m)	300 lb (140 kg)	–	
Nigajuan Mansell; OL	Recruit ratings: No ratings found					
Miller McCrumby; TE	Mount Pleasant, TX	Mount Pleasant HS; Arkansas State	6 ft 4 in (1.93 m)	238 lb (108 kg)	–	
Miller McCrumby; TE	Recruit ratings: No ratings found					
T.I. Mims Jr. WR	Bay Minette, AL	Baldwin County HS	5 ft 11 in (1.80 m)	175 lb (79 kg)	–	Dec 19, 2024
T.I. Mims Jr. WR	Recruit ratings: Rivals: 247Sports:					
Keenan Phillips; RB	Bainbridge, GA	Bainbridge HS; Georgia Military College	5 ft 9 in (1.75 m)	185 lb (84 kg)	–	Jan 8, 2025
Keenan Phillips; RB	Recruit ratings: No ratings found					
E'Mauri Smiley; DL	Opelika, AL	Opelika HS	6 ft 3 in (1.91 m)	254 lb (115 kg)	–	Jul 7, 2024
E'Mauri Smiley; DL	Recruit ratings: Rivals: 247Sports: ESPN: (74)					
Lorenzo Smith; DB	Farmhaven, MS	Velma Jackson HS; Jones College	6 ft 0 in (1.83 m)	190 lb (86 kg)	–	Dec 3, 2024
Lorenzo Smith; DB	Recruit ratings: 247Sports: ESPN: (76)					
Shermon Smith; LB	Sylvester, GA	Worth County HS	6 ft 1 in (1.85 m)	210 lb (95 kg)	–	Aug 7, 2024
Shermon Smith; LB	Recruit ratings: Rivals: 247Sports: ESPN: (73)					
Trae Stevenson; WR	Madison, MS	Germantown HS	6 ft 0 in (1.83 m)	170 lb (77 kg)	–	Aug 2, 2024
Trae Stevenson; WR	Recruit ratings: Rivals: 247Sports:					
Jeremiah Thomas; DB	Havana, FL	Gadsden County HS	5 ft 10 in (1.78 m)	170 lb (77 kg)	–	May 31, 2024
Jeremiah Thomas; DB	Recruit ratings: Rivals: 247Sports:					
Deuce Vance; DB	Hattiesburg, MS	Hattiesburg HS	5 ft 11 in (1.80 m)	178 lb (81 kg)	–	Sep 25, 2024
Deuce Vance; DB	Recruit ratings: Rivals: 247Sports:					
Devin White; OL	Tuscaloosa, AL	Northridge HS	6 ft 4 in (1.93 m)	290 lb (130 kg)	–	Dec 4, 2024
Devin White; OL	Recruit ratings: 247Sports:					
Dominic Wisemam; DL	Davenport, IA	North HS; Iowa; Iowa Western CC	6 ft 1 in (1.85 m)	300 lb (140 kg)	–	Dec 4, 2024
Dominic Wisemam; DL	Recruit ratings: 247Sports:					
Tywon Wray Jr. S	Atlanta, GA	Campbell HS; Oklahoma	6 ft 1 in (1.85 m)	200 lb (91 kg)	–	
Tywon Wray Jr. S	Recruit ratings: 247Sports:					
Dallas Young; DB	Gardendale, AL	Gardendale HS; Arkansas	6 ft 0 in (1.83 m)	196 lb (89 kg)	–	
Dallas Young; DB	Recruit ratings: No ratings found					

=== Roster ===
2025 South Alabama Jaguars football team roster
Players
Coaches
Offense

Pos.	#	Name	Class
WR	0	PJ Martin	So
WR	1	Devin Voisin	GS
TE	2	Miller McCrumby	Sr
RB	3	Kentrel Bullock	Sr
QB	4	Bishop Davenport	Jr
WR	6	Micah Woods	Sr
QB	7	Jared Hollins	Fr
QB	8	Zach Pyron	Jr
WR	9	Jeremy Scott	Fr
WR	10	Noah Toster	So
WR	11	Anthony Eager	So
WR	12	Brendan Jenkins	Jr
WR	13	Jeremiah Jones-Thomas	Fr
TE	14	Maddox Lynch	Fr
RB	15	Chris Holifield Jr.	Sr
QB	16	Bubba Thompson (W)	Fr
WR	17	Jace Larsen	So
WR	18	Keyshawn Woodyard	Sr
TE	19	Rod Gibbs	Jr
RB	21	Keenan Phillips	So
RB	23	Iverson Celestine	Sr
RB	24	Julyon Jordan	Fr
RB	25	Trae'von Dunbar	Fr
WR	27	Tylen Campbell	Jr
RB	34	Andre Spence	Fr
OL	54	Leavy Johnson	So
OL	55	Malachi Preciado	Jr
OL	56	Adrian Griffin	So
OL	57	Amaury Wiggins	Sr
OL	59	Sam Williams	Sr
OL	61	Julius Kidd	Jr
OL	62	Ni Mansell	Jr
OL	64	Jamal Siler	Fr
OL	65	DeShaun Gonzales	So
OL	66	Devin White	Fr
OL	68	Reese Osei-Wusu	So
OL	69	Kenton Jerido	Jr
OL	70	Asher Hale	So
OL	71	Jaylen Booker	Fr
OL	72	Ethan Hubbard	So
OL	73	Daniel Foster-Allen	Sr
OL	74	Brayden Ramey	So
OL	75	Damon Parr	Jr
OL	76	Logan Joellenbeck	Fr
OL	77	Kearius Bivens	Fr
OL	78	Noah Boyd	Fr
OL	79	Jordan Davis	Sr
TE	80	Hollis McDaniel	So
TE	81	Brec Long	Jr
TE	82	Trent Thomas	So
WR	83	Jerrian Graham	Fr
TE	84	Nate Forystek	Jr
WR	85	Ti Mims	Fr
WR	87	Trae Stevenson	Fr
TE	88	Owen Carlson	Fr
WR	89	Nick Simmons	Fr

Defense

Pos.	#	Name	Class
S	0	Christopher Wallace Jr.	Sr
S	1	Wesley Miller	Jr
CB	2	Jayvon Henderson	Jr
S	3	Tywon Wray Jr.	So
S	4	Kohl Bradley	Fr
CB	6	Nehemiah Chandler	Fr
S	7	Ty Goodwill	So
S	8	Mike Harris	Sr
DL	9	Emmanuel Waller	Jr
CB	10	Saivion Kenon	So
LB	11	Dalton Hughes	Sr
S	12	Anthony Brown	Jr
S	13	David Houston III	So
S	14	Cole Blaylock	So
LB	15	Chrystyile Caldwell	Jr
S	16	Brian Dillard	Sr
S	17	Dallas Young	So
DL	18	RJ Moss Jr.	So
CB	19	Deuce Vance	Fr
LB	20	Tirrell Johnson Jr.	Jr
LB	21	William Felton IV	Fr
LB	22	Caleb Dozier	Fr
CB	23	Cube Gurley	Fr
S	24	Damyrion Darby	So
LB	25	Tre'Mon Henry	So
LB	26	Parker Shattuck	So
LB	27	IBK Mafe	Sr
LB	28	Darius McKenzie	Sr
S	29	Kaleb Jackson	So
DL	30	Achilles Woods	Fr
S	31	Dashaun Caffee	Fr
LB	32	Blayne Myrick	Jr
CB	33	Davaris Pilcher	Sr
CB	34	Bradley Thomas	Jr
S	35	Matthew Laseter	Fr
S	36	Micah McKay	So
S	38	Camden Lawson	Fr
DL	41	Tyler Carter	Fr
LB	43	Jacob Porco	Fr
DL	45	Ed Smith IV	Sr
LB	47	Donnie Arnold	Fr
LB	48	Jordan Williams	So
DL	51	Jordan May	Jr
DL	52	Janier Armstead	So
LB	53	Latrelle Latt	Fr
DL	90	E'Mauri Smiley	Fr
DL	91	Nathan Jennings	Fr
DL	95	Johnathan Street	Sr
DL	96	Dominic Wiseman	Jr
DL	97	Tyler Thomas	So
DL	98	Tre Brown	So
DL	99	Stephen Johnson	So

Special teams

Pos.	#	Name	Class
K	35	Davis Little	Fr
K/P	39	James Whatley	Fr
P	40	Aleksi Pulkkinen	Jr
LS	42	Anthony Zaccaro	Sr
LS	44	Baxter Turner	So
P	46	Blayne Munson	Fr
LS	47	Grant Rountree	Fr
K	94	Hamilton DiBoyan	So

Head coach

- Major Applewhite (Texas)

Coordinators/assistant coaches

- Will Windham (Mississippi State)
  Defensive coordinator / safeties
- Paul Petrino (Carroll (MT))
  Offensive coordinator / wide receivers
- Tre' Williams (Auburn)
  Special teams coordinator / outside linebackers
- Jason Washington (Texas State)
  Co-defensive coordinator / cornerbacks
- Cameron Cleminson (Michigan State)
  Inside linebackers
- Kyle Skierski (UC Davis)
  Tight ends
- Jason Onyebuagu (Northern Illinois)
  Offensive line
- Broderick Fobbs (Grambling State)
  Running backs
- Jerone Steckel (Eastern Illinois)
  Defensive line
- Zach Crisler (Arkansas State)
  Assistant quarterbacks
- Doug Ruse (Northwest Missouri State)
  Offensive quality control analyst
- Rod Grace (UT Martin)
  Director of strength & conditioning

Legend

- (C) Team captain
- (S) Suspended
- (I) Ineligible
- Injured
- Redshirt

Roster

== Game summaries ==
=== Morgan State (FCS) ===
Morgan State Bears (FCS) (0–0) at South Alabama Jaguars (0–0) – Game summary

Quarter	1	2	3	4	Total
Bears (FCS)	7	0	7	7	21
Jaguars	7	10	7	14	38

at Hancock Whitney Stadium • Mobile, AL

- Date: August 30, 2025
- Game time: 6:00 p.m. CDT
- Game weather: Cloudy • Temperature: 84 °F (29 °C)
- Game attendance: 14,017
- Referee: Michael Farmer
- TV announcers (ESPN+): Pat Greenwood (play-by-play) and Brian Genard (analyst)

Game information

First quarter

- (8:36) MORG – Jason Collins Jr. 2-yard run, Sahr Gbundema kick (Drive: 11 plays, 80 yards, 6:18; Morgan State 7–0)
- (5:01) USA – Kentrel Bullock 1-yard run, Hamilton DiBoyan kick (Drive: 9 plays, 75 yards, 3:35; Tied 7–7)

Second quarter

- (12:54) USA – Hamilton DiBoyan 23-yard field goal (Drive: 5 plays, 13 yards, 2:25; South Alabama 10–7)
- (1:54) USA – Anthony Eager 19-yard pass from Bishop Davenport, Hamilton DiBoyan kick (Drive: 5 plays, 45 yards, 2:01; South Alabama 17–7)

Third quarter

- (10:17) USA – PJ Martin 3-yard run, Hamilton DiBoyan kick (Drive: 10 plays, 75 yards, 4:43; South Alabama 24–7)
- (4:13) MORG – Jason Collins Jr. 3-yard run, Sahr Gbundema kick (Drive: 10 plays, 75 yards, 6:04; South Alabama 24–14)

Fourth quarter

- (9:27) USA – Kentrel Bullock 2-yard run, Hamilton DiBoyan kick (Drive: 2 plays, 4 yards, 0:31; South Alabama 31–14)
- (7:47) USA – Devin Voisin 31-yard pass from Bishop Davenport, Hamilton DiBoyan kick (Drive: 1 play, 31 yards, 0:07; South Alabama 38–14)
- (3:24) MORG – Randall Nauden 7-yard run, Sahr Gbundema kick (Drive: 9 plays, 75 yards, 4:23; South Alabama 38–21)

Statistics	MORG	USA
First downs	17	19
Plays–yards	65–326	56–367
Rushes–yards	40–167	41–193
Passing yards	159	174
Passing: Comp–Att–Int	15–25–1	13–15–0
Turnovers	4	1
Time of possession	33:38	26:22

Team	Category	Player	Statistics
Morgan State	Passing	Kobe Muasau	14/22, 156 yards, INT
Morgan State	Rushing	Jason Collins Jr.	24 carries, 83 yards, 2 TD
Morgan State	Receiving	Joseph Kennerly Jr.	2 receptions, 34 yards
South Alabama	Passing	Bishop Davenport	12/14, 166 yards, 2 TD
South Alabama	Rushing	Kentrel Bullock	23 carries, 127 yards, 2 TD
South Alabama	Receiving	Devin Voisin	7 receptions, 69 yards, TD

=== Tulane ===
Tulane Green Wave (1–0) at South Alabama Jaguars (1–0) – Game summary

Quarter	1	2	3	4	Total
Green Wave	14	10	3	6	33
Jaguars	14	0	0	17	31

at Hancock Whitney Stadium • Mobile, AL

- Date: September 6, 2025
- Game time: 6:00 p.m. CDT
- Game weather: Cloudy • Temperature: 84 °F (29 °C) • Wind: S 4 mph
- Game attendance: 16,871
- Referee: Ted Pitts
- TV announcers (ESPN+): Pat Greenwood (play-by-play) and Brian Genard (analyst)

Game information

First Quarter

- (10:48) USA – Bishop Davenport 9-yard run, Hamilton DiBoyan kick (Drive: 9 plays, 75 yards, 4:12; South Alabama 7–0)
- (7:11) USA – Devin Voisin 65-yard pass from Bishop Davenport, Hamilton DiBoyan kick (Drive: 3 plays, 77 yards, 1:00; South Alabama 14–0)
- (4:11) TULN – Johnny Pascuzzi 5-yard pass from Jake Retzlaff, Patrick Durkin kick (Drive: 7 plays, 55 yards, 2:52; South Alabama 14–7)
- (0:24) TULN – Zuberi Mobley 16-yard run, Patrick Durkin kick (Drive: 7 plays, 42 yards, 2:56; Tied 14–14)

Second Quarter

- (6:52) TULN – Jake Retzlaff 1-yard run, Patrick Durkin kick (Drive: 11 plays, 57 yards, 5:28; Tulane 21–14)
- (0:49) TULN – Patrick Durkin 50-yard field goal (Drive: 9 plays, 53 yards, 4:14; Tulane 24–14)

Third Quarter

- (8:51) TULN – Patrick Durkin 34-yard field goal (Drive: 12 plays, 61 yards, 6:02; Tulane 27–14)

Fourth Quarter

- (14:57) USA – Hamilton DiBoyan 28-yard field goal (Drive: 8 plays, 40 yards, 3:20; Tulane 27–17)
- (10:01) TULN – Zuberi Mobley 28-yard run (Drive: 10 plays, 78 yards, 4:51; Tulane 33–17)
- (5:27) USA – Kentrel Bullock 1-yard run, Bishop Davenport rush (Drive: 12 plays, 75 yards, 4:34; Tulane 33–25)
- (0:59) USA – Devin Voisin 26-yard pass from Bishop Davenport (Drive: 7 plays, 80 yards, 1:22; Tulane 33–31)

Statistics	TULN	USA
First downs	23	23
Plays–yards	72–406	65–421
Rushes–yards	45–241	41–190
Passing yards	165	231
Passing: comp–att–int	16–27–0	17–24–0
Turnovers	1	2
Time of possession	34:29	25:31

Team	Category	Player	Statistics
Tulane	Passing	Jake Retzlaff	13/24, 125 yards, TD
Tulane	Rushing	Zuberi Mobley	11 carries, 82 yards, 2 TD
Tulane	Receiving	Bryce Bohanon	5 receptions, 62 yards
South Alabama	Passing	Bishop Davenport	17/24, 231 yards, 2 TD
South Alabama	Rushing	Kentrel Bullock	24 carries, 107 yards, TD
South Alabama	Receiving	Devin Voisin	8 receptions, 152 yards, 2 TD

=== at No. 24 Auburn ===
South Alabama Jaguars (1–1) at No. 24 Auburn Tigers (2–0) – Game summary

Quarter	1	2	3	4	Total
Jaguars	3	6	6	0	15
No. 24 Tigers	7	21	3	0	31

at Jordan-Hare Stadium • Auburn, AL

- Date: September 13, 2025
- Game time: 11:45 a.m. CDT
- Game weather: Sunny • Temperature: 82 °F (28 °C)
- Game attendance: 88,043
- Referee: James Carter
- TV announcers (SECN): Taylor Zarzour (play-by-play), Matt Stinchcomb (analyst), and Alyssa Lang (sideline reporter)

Game information

First quarter

- AUB – Cam Coleman 32-yard pass from Jackson Arnold (Alex McPherson kick), 9:09. Auburn 7–0. Drive: 12 plays, 92 yards, 5:51.
- USA – Hamilton DiBoyan 29-yard field goal, 3:43. Auburn 7–3. Drive: 12 plays, 64 yards, 5:26.

Second quarter

- AUB – Jackson Arnold 6-yard run (Alex McPherson kick), 14:14. Auburn 14–3. Drive: 5 plays, 33 yards, 1:30.
- AUB – Jackson Arnold 5-yard run (Alex McPherson kick), 9:48. Auburn 21–3. Drive: 7 plays, 54 yards, 2:36.
- USA – Jeremy Scott 32-yard pass from Bishop Davenport (Hamilton DiBoyan kick failed), 5:24. Auburn 21–9. Drive: 10 plays, 75 yards, 4:24.
- AUB – Jeremiah Cobb 2-yard run (Alex McPherson kick), 0:40. Auburn 28–9. Drive: 14 plays, 75 yards, 4:44.

Third quarter

- USA – Devin Voisin 12-yard pass from Bishop Davenport (Hamilton DiBoyan kick failed), 9:55. Auburn 28–15. Drive: 11 plays, 75 yards, 5:05.
- AUB – Alex McPherson 34-yard field goal, 1:15. Auburn 31–15. Drive: 16 plays, 62 yards, 8:34.

Fourth quarter

- No scoring plays.

Statistics	USA	AUB
First downs	21	19
Plays–yards	68–310	63–337
Rushes–yards	42–140	39–195
Passing yards	170	142
Passing: comp–att–int	18–26–1	13–24–0
Turnovers	2	0
Time of possession	31:27	28:33

Team	Category	Player	Statistics
South Alabama	Passing	Bishop Davenport	18/26, 170 yards, 2 TD, INT
South Alabama	Rushing	Kentrel Bullock	16 carries, 57 yards
South Alabama	Receiving	Anthony Eager	8 receptions, 55 yards
Auburn	Passing	Jackson Arnold	13/24, 142 yards, TD
Auburn	Rushing	Jeremiah Cobb	19 carries, 119 yards, TD
Auburn	Receiving	Eric Singleton Jr.	6 receptions, 65 yards

=== Coastal Carolina ===
Coastal Carolina Chanticleers (1–2) at South Alabama Jaguars (1–2) – Game summary

Quarter	1	2	3	4	Total
Chanticleers	0	7	14	17	38
Jaguars	0	14	3	3	20

at Hancock Whitney Stadium • Mobile, AL

- Date: September 20, 2025
- Game time: 6:00 p.m. CDT
- Game weather: Sunny • Temperature: 82 °F (28 °C) • Wind: N 2 mph
- Game attendance: 17,050
- Referee: Jeremy Parker
- TV announcers (ESPN+): Pat Greenwood (play-by-play) and Brian Genard (analyst)

Game information

First quarter

- No scoring plays.

Second quarter

- (7:12) USA – Anthony Eager 0-yard run, Hamilton DiBoyan kick (Drive: 8 plays, 60 yards, 3:37; South Alabama 7–0)
- (5:08) CCU – Malick Meiga 19-yard pass from Tad Hudson, Kian Afrookhteh kick (Drive: 6 plays, 65 yards, 2:04; Tied 7–7)
- (1:24) USA – Kentrel Bullock 2-yard run, Hamilton DiBoyan kick (Drive: 8 plays, 75 yards, 3:44; South Alabama 14–7)

Third quarter

- (13:16) CCU – Robby Washington 17-yard pass from Tad Hudson, Kian Afrookhteh kick (Drive: 3 plays, 40 yards, 1:01; Tied 14–14)
- (11:19) CCU – Tad Hudson 7-yard run, Kian Afrookhteh kick (Drive: 5 plays, 20 yards, 1:47; Coastal Carolina 21–14)
- (5:11) USA – Hamilton DiBoyan 37-yard field goal (Drive: 12 plays, 55 yards, 6:08; Coastal Carolina 21–17)

Fourth quarter

- (10:00) CCU – Ja'Vin Simpkins 24-yard run, Kian Afrookhteh kick (Drive: 6 plays, 80 yards, 2:29; Coastal Carolina 28–17)
- (6:32) USA – Hamilton DiBoyan 47-yard field goal (Drive: 8 plays, 46 yards, 3:28; Coastal Carolina 28–20)
- (2:48) CCU – Kian Afrookhteh 44-yard field goal (Drive: 4 plays, 0 yards, 0:53; Coastal Carolina 31–20)
- (2:32) CCU – Tray Brown 13-yard fumble recovery, Kian Afrookhteh kick (Coastal Carolina 38–20)

Statistics	CCU	USA
First downs	15	22
Plays–yards	56–294	80–420
Rushes–yards	31–182	44–223
Passing yards	112	197
Passing: Comp–Att–Int	13–25–0	22–36–2
Turnovers	0	2
Time of possession	23:19	36:41

Team	Category	Player	Statistics
Coastal Carolina	Passing	Tad Hudson	13/25, 112 yards, 2 TD
Coastal Carolina	Rushing	Ja'Vin Simpkins	9 carries, 84 yards, TD
Coastal Carolina	Receiving	Bryson Graves	5 receptions, 35 yards
South Alabama	Passing	Bishop Davenport	22/36, 197 yards, 2 INT
South Alabama	Rushing	Keenan Phillips	13 carries, 104 yards
South Alabama	Receiving	Devin Voisin	8 receptions, 94 yards

=== at North Texas ===
South Alabama Jaguars (1–3) at North Texas Mean Green (4–0) – Game summary

Quarter	1	2	3	4	Total
Jaguars	7	0	7	8	22
Mean Green	7	7	14	8	36

at DATCU Stadium • Denton, TX

- Date: September 27, 2025
- Game time: 11:00 a.m. CDT
- Game weather: Sunny • Temperature: 79 °F (26 °C)
- Game attendance: 16,575
- Referee: Steve Robinson
- TV announcers (ESPNU): Matt Schumacker (play-by-play) and Dustin Fox (analyst)

Game information

First Quarter

- (10:40) USA – Bishop Davenport 2-yard run, Hamilton DiBoyan kick (Drive: 10 plays, 75 yards, 4:20; South Alabama 7–0)
- (7:04) UNT – Miles Coleman 18-yard run, Kali Nguma kick (Drive: 8 plays, 75 yards, 3:36; Tied 7–7)

Second Quarter

- (7:19) UNT – Caleb Hawkins 6-yard run, Kali Nguma kick (Drive: 4 plays, 35 yards, 1:10; North Texas 14–7)

Third Quarter

- (10:25) UNT – Caleb Hawkins 68-yard pass from Drew Mestemaker, Kali Nguma kick (Drive: 2 plays, 64 yards, 0:35; North Texas 21–7)
- (6:00) USA – Rod Gibbs 1-yard pass from Bishop Davenport, Hamilton DiBoyan kick (Drive: 12 plays, 75 yards, 4:25; North Texas 21–14)
- (2:08) UNT – Drew Mestemaker 4-yard run, Kali Nguma kick (Drive: 7 plays, 47 yards, 3:43; North Texas 28–14)

Fourth Quarter

- (6:11) USA – Kentrel Bullock 2-yard run, Bishop Davenport rush (Drive: 10 plays, 87 yards, 4:04; North Texas 28–22)
- (1:59) UNT – Caleb Hawkins 27-yard run, Wyatt Young pass (Drive: 7 plays, 75 yards, 4:12; North Texas 36–22)

Statistics	USA	UNT
First downs	19	20
Plays–yards	80–396	65–429
Rushes–yards	45–204	39–195
Passing yards	192	234
Passing: comp–att–int	18–35–0	14–26–1
Turnovers	1	1
Time of possession	32:28	27:32

Team	Category	Player	Statistics
South Alabama	Passing	Bishop Davenport	17/34, 195 yards, TD, INT
South Alabama	Rushing	PJ Martin	10 carries, 60 yards
South Alabama	Receiving	Devin Voisin	5 receptions, 97 yards
North Texas	Passing	Drew Mestemaker	14/26, 234 yards, TD
North Texas	Rushing	Caleb Hawkins	16 carries, 140 yards, 2 TD
North Texas	Receiving	Caleb Hawkins	2 receptions, 78 yards, TD

=== at Troy (Battle for the Belt) ===
South Alabama Jaguars (1–4) at Troy Trojans (2–2) – Game summary

Quarter	1	2	3	4	OT	Total
Jaguars	7	0	10	7	0	24
Trojans	7	7	7	3	7	31

at Veterans Memorial Stadium • Troy, AL

- Date: October 4, 2025
- Game time: 6:00 p.m. CDT
- Game weather: Cloudy • Temperature: 77 °F (25 °C) • Wind: NE 7 mph
- Game attendance: 28,035
- Referee: Trennis Livingston
- TV announcers (ESPN+): Will Kollmeyer (play-by-play), Ben Stanfield (analyst) and Junior Louissaint (sideline)

Game information

First quarter

- (7:12) TROY – Tucker Kilcrease 34-yard run, Scott Taylor Renfroe kick (Drive: 10 plays, 82 yards, 4:48; Troy 7–0)
- (3:05) USA – Micah Woods 33-yard pass from Bishop Davenport, Hamilton DiBoyan kick (Drive: 9 plays, 75 yards, 4:07; Tied 7–7)

Second quarter

- (1:32) TROY – RaRa Thomas 25-yard pass from Tucker Kilcrease, Scott Taylor Renfroe kick (Drive: 4 plays, 65 yards, 1:07; Troy 14–7)

Third quarter

- (12:07) USA – Hamilton DiBoyan 40-yard field goal (Drive: 6 plays, 13 yards, 2:38; Troy 14–10)
- (7:02) USA – Bishop Davenport 56-yard run, Hamilton DiBoyan kick (Drive: 6 plays, 86 yards, 3:01; South Alabama 17–14)
- (3:50) TROY – DJ Epps 11-yard pass from Tucker Kilcrease, Scott Taylor Renfroe kick (Drive: 7 plays, 75 yards, 3:12; Troy 21–17)

Fourth quarter

- (6:47) TROY – Scott Taylor Renfroe 28-yard field goal (Drive: 12 plays, 67 yards, 7:03; Troy 24–17)
- (1:54) USA – Kentrel Bullock 15-yard pass from Bishop Davenport, Hamilton DiBoyan kick (Drive: 10 plays, 75 yards, 4:53; Tied 24–24)

Overtime

- (0:00) TROY – Tae Meadows 3-yard run, Scott Taylor Renfroe kick (Drive: 3 plays, 25 yards, 0:00; Troy 31–24)

Statistics	USA	TROY
First downs	18	20
Plays–yards	71–369	66–420
Rushes–yards	56–265	45–217
Passing yards	104	203
Passing: Comp–Att–Int	10–15–0	13–21–1
Turnovers	0	2
Time of possession	30:11	29:49

Team	Category	Player	Statistics
South Alabama	Passing	Bishop Davenport	10/15, 104 yards, 2 TD
South Alabama	Rushing	Kentrel Bullock	21 carries, 86 yards
South Alabama	Receiving	Devin Voisin	5 receptions, 44 yards
Troy	Passing	Tucker Kilcrease	13/21, 203 yards, 2 TD, INT
Troy	Rushing	Tucker Kilcrease	19 carries, 102 yards, TD
Troy	Receiving	Tray Taylor	2 receptions, 74 yards

=== Arkansas State ===
Arkansas State Red Wolves (2–4) at South Alabama Jaguars (1–5) – Game summary

Quarter	1	2	3	4	Total
Red Wolves	0	3	0	12	15
Jaguars	7	0	7	0	14

at Hancock Whitney Stadium • Mobile, AL

- Date: October 14, 2025
- Game time: 6:30 p.m. CDT
- Game weather: Clear • Temperature: 78 °F (26 °C) • Wind: S 7 mph
- Game attendance: 19,634
- Referee: Tim Barker
- TV announcers (ESPN2): Matt Schumacker (play-by-play) and Dustin Fox (analyst)

Game information

First quarter

- (2:50) USA – Kentrel Bullock 9-yard run, Hamilton DiBoyan kick (Drive: 9 plays, 75 yards, 4:21; South Alabama 7–0)

Second quarter

- (12:02) ARST – Clune Van Andel 25-yard field goal (Drive: 7 plays, 38 yards, 2:15; South Alabama 7–3)

Third quarter

- (1:34) USA – PJ Martin 27-yard run, Hamilton DiBoyan kick (Drive: 5 plays, 58 yards, 1:50; South Alabama 14–3)

Fourth quarter

- (10:43) ARST – Clune Van Andel 37-yard field goal (Drive: 14 plays, 56 yards, 5:45; South Alabama 14–6)
- (7:51) ARST – Hunter Summers 6-yard pass from Jaylen Raynor (Drive: 2 plays, 48 yards, 0:40; South Alabama 14–12)
- (0:00) ARST – Clune Van Andel 38-yard field goal (Drive: 10 plays, 60 yards, 1:50; Arkansas State 15–14)

Statistics	ARST	USA
First downs	21	15
Plays–yards	77–367	59–278
Rushes–yards	32–158	36–160
Passing yards	209	118
Passing: Comp–Att–Int	29–45–1	18–23–0
Turnovers	1	0
Time of possession	29:56	30:04

Team	Category	Player	Statistics
Arkansas State	Passing	Jaylen Raynor	29/45, 209 yards, TD, INT
Arkansas State	Rushing	Jaylen Raynor	14 carries, 76 yards
Arkansas State	Receiving	Chauncy Cobb	6 receptions, 68 yards
South Alabama	Passing	Bishop Davenport	18/23, 118 yards
South Alabama	Rushing	Kentrel Bullock	16 carries, 72 yards, TD
South Alabama	Receiving	Devin Voisin	4 receptions, 43 yards

=== at Georgia State ===
South Alabama Jaguars (1–6) at Georgia State Panthers (1–6) – Game summary

Quarter	1	2	3	4	Total
Jaguars	21	7	0	10	38
Panthers	14	0	3	14	31

at Center Parc Stadium • Atlanta, GA

- Date: October 23, 2025
- Game time: 7:30 p.m. EDT
- Game weather: Sunny
- Game attendance: 13,673
- Referee: Scott Broadway
- TV announcers (ESPN2): Matt Barrie (play-by-play), Tom Luginbill (analyst) and Harry Lyles Jr. (sideline)

Game information

First quarter

- (8:40) USA – Brendan Jenkins 18-yard pass from Bishop Davenport, Hamilton DiBoyan kick (Drive: 10 plays, 53 yards, 4:57; South Alabama 7–0)
- (7:15) GAST – Ted Hurst 70-yard pass from Cameran Brown, Liam Rickman kick (Drive: 3 plays, 74 yards, 1:20; Tied 7–7)
- (6:12) USA – Jeremy Scott 74-yard pass from Bishop Davenport, Hamilton DiBoyan kick (Drive: 3 plays, 75 yards, 1:03; South Alabama 14–7)
- (3:55) GAST – Dennis Murray Jr. 52-yard pass from Cameran Brown, Liam Rickman kick (Drive: 6 plays, 75 yards, 2:17; Tied 14–14)
- (2:12) USA – Kentrel Bullock 6-yard run, Hamilton DiBoyan kick (Drive: 4 plays, 75 yards, 1:43; South Alabama 21–14)

Second quarter

- (7:55) USA – Bishop Davenport 3-yard run, Hamilton DiBoyan kick (Drive: 14 plays, 82 yards, 6:46; South Alabama 28–14)

Third quarter

- (8:04) GAST – Liam Rickman 25-yard field goal (Drive: 15 plays, 69 yards, 5:59; South Alabama 28–17)

Fourth quarter

- (14:56) GAST – Ted Hurst 5-yard pass from Cameran Brown (Drive: 13 plays, 62 yards, 6:24; South Alabama 28–23)
- (9:38) GAST – Grant Hollier 11-yard pass from Cameran Brown, Dennis Murray Jr. pass (Drive: 9 plays, 65 yards, 3:49; Georgia State 31–28)
- (5:39) USA – Davis Little 23-yard field goal (Drive: 9 plays, 70 yards, 3:59; Tied 31–31)
- (1:49) USA – Kentrel Bullock 4-yard run, Davis Little kick (Drive: 6 plays, 47 yards, 2:22; South Alabama 38–31)

Statistics	USA	GAST
First downs	20	23
Plays–yards	69–468	70–440
Rushes–yards	47–188	37–199
Passing yards	280	241
Passing: Comp–Att–Int	16–22–0	19–33–1
Turnovers	0	2
Time of possession	30:03	29:57

Team	Category	Player	Statistics
South Alabama	Passing	Bishop Davenport	16/22, 280 yards, 2 TD
South Alabama	Rushing	Kentrel Bullock	20 carries, 113 yards, 2 TD
South Alabama	Receiving	Jeremy Scott	3 receptions, 121 yards, TD
Georgia State	Passing	Cameran Brown	19/33, 241 yards, 4 TD, INT
Georgia State	Rushing	Jordon Simmons	11 carries, 78 yards
Georgia State	Receiving	Ted Hurst	5 receptions, 110 yards, 2 TD

=== Louisiana ===
Louisiana Ragin' Cajuns (2–6) at South Alabama Jaguars (2–6) – Game summary

Quarter	1	2	3	4	Total
Ragin' Cajuns	10	14	7	0	31
Jaguars	0	7	7	8	22

at Hancock Whitney Stadium • Mobile, AL

- Date: November 1, 2025
- Game time: 2:30 p.m. CDT
- Game weather: Sunny • Temperature: 69 °F (21 °C) • Wind: W 5 mph
- Game attendance: 18,462
- Referee: Jeremy Parker
- TV announcers (ESPN+): Pat Greenwood (play-by-play) and Brian Genard (analyst)

Game information

First quarter

- (8:05) LA – Shelton Sampson Jr. 25-yard pass from Lunch Winfield, Tony Sterner kick (Drive: 9 plays, 75 yards, 4:46; Louisiana 7–0)
- (1:24) LA – Tony Sterner 32-yard field goal (Drive: 9 plays, 60 yards, 5:04; Louisiana 10–0)

Second quarter

- (9:38) USA – Keenan Phillips 15-yard run, Davis Little kick (Drive: 16 plays, 84 yards, 6:46; Louisiana 10–7)
- (2:09) LA – Zylan Perry 18-yard run, Tony Sterner kick (Drive: 12 plays, 75 yards, 7:29; Louisiana 17–7)
- (0:11) LA – Shelton Sampson Jr. 17-yard pass from Lunch Winfield, Tony Sterner kick (Drive: 6 plays, 64 yards, 1:25; Louisiana 24–7)

Third quarter

- (11:58) LA – Lunch Winfield 1-yard run, Tony Sterner kick (Drive: 7 plays, 75 yards, 3:02; Louisiana 31–7)
- (6:54) USA – Bishop Davenport 5-yard run, Davis Little kick (Drive: 12 plays, 75 yards, 5:04; Louisiana 31–14)

Fourth quarter

- (11:59) USA – Jeremy Scott 64-yard pass from Bishop Davenport, Davis Little kick (Drive: 1 play, 64 yards, 0:10; Louisiana 31–22)

Statistics	LA	USA
First downs	22	21
Plays–yards	63–393	69–368
Rushes–yards	46–161	36–165
Passing yards	232	203
Passing: Comp–Att–Int	14–17–0	20–33–1
Turnovers	0	1
Time of possession	32:54	27:06

Team	Category	Player	Statistics
Louisiana	Passing	Lunch Winfield	14/15, 232 yards, 2 TD
Louisiana	Rushing	Zylan Perry	15 carries, 56 yards, TD
Louisiana	Receiving	Shelton Sampson Jr.	6 receptions, 138 yards, 2 TD
South Alabama	Passing	Bishop Davenport	20/33, 203 yards, TD, INT
South Alabama	Rushing	Keenan Phillips	13 carries, 75 yards, TD
South Alabama	Receiving	Jeremy Scott	6 receptions, 102 yards, TD

=== at Louisiana–Monroe ===
South Alabama Jaguars (2–7) at Louisiana–Monroe Warhawks (3–6) – Game summary

Quarter	1	2	3	4	Total
Jaguars	0	7	13	6	26
Warhawks	14	0	0	0	14

at Malone Stadium • Monroe, LA

- Date: November 15, 2025
- Game time: 2:30 pm CST
- Game weather: Sunny • Temperature: 82 °F (28 °C) • Wind: SW 16 mph
- Game attendance: 19,872
- Referee: Brandon Kirkland
- TV announcers (ESPN+): Sean Fox (play-by-play) and Desmund Lighten (analyst)

Game information

First quarter

- (13:08) ULM – Braylon McReynolds 29-yard run, Jacob Chambliss kick (Drive: 1 play, 29 yards, 0:08; Louisiana–Monroe 7–0)
- (5:42) ULM – Noah Flemmings 42-yard fumble recovery, Jacob Chambliss kick (Louisiana–Monroe 14–0)

Second quarter

- (11:03) USA – Kentrel Bullock 1-yard run, Davis Little kick (Drive: 9 plays, 64 yards, 4:14; Louisiana–Monroe 14–7)

Third quarter

- (10:03) USA – Bishop Davenport 1-yard run, Davis Little kick (Drive: 6 plays, 69 yards, 2:57; Tied 14–14)
- (5:05) USA – Bishop Davenport 3-yard run (Drive: 9 plays, 66 yards, 3:37; South Alabama 20–14)

Fourth quarter

- (14:36) USA – Kentrel Bullock 8-yard run (Drive: 7 plays, 45 yards, 2:59; South Alabama 26–14)

Statistics	USA	ULM
First downs	24	9
Plays–yards	76–362	43–154
Rushes–yards	53–200	24–72
Passing yards	162	82
Passing: Comp–Att–Int	17–23–0	10–19–1
Turnovers	1	1
Time of possession	37:25	22:35

Team	Category	Player	Statistics
South Alabama	Passing	Bishop Davenport	17/23, 162 yards
South Alabama	Rushing	Kentrel Bullock	20 carries, 85 yards, 2 TD
South Alabama	Receiving	Anthony Eager	5 receptions, 83 yards
Louisiana–Monroe	Passing	Aiden Armenta	10/19, 82 yards, INT
Louisiana–Monroe	Rushing	Braylon McReynolds	12 carries, 52 yards, TD
Louisiana–Monroe	Receiving	Julian Nixon	2 receptions, 31 yards

=== Southern Miss ===
Southern Miss Golden Eagles (7–3) at South Alabama Jaguars (3–7) – Game summary

Quarter	1	2	3	4	Total
Golden Eagles	0	7	7	21	35
Jaguars	7	14	14	7	42

at Hancock Whitney Stadium • Mobile, AL

- Date: November 22, 2025
- Game time: 2:30 p.m. CDT
- Game weather: Cloudy • Temperature: 79 °F (26 °C) • Wind: E 8 mph
- Game attendance: 17,601
- Referee: Tedd Pitts
- TV announcers (ESPN+): Pat Greenwood (play-byplay) and Brian Genard (analyst)

Game information

First quarter

- (0:56) USA – Keenan Phillips 13-yard run, Davis Little kick (Drive: 7 plays, 58 yards, 3:42; South Alabama 7–0)

Second quarter

- (11:15) USA – Kentrel Bullock 15-yard run, Davis Little kick (Drive: 7 plays, 63 yards, 3:36; South Alabama 14–0)
- (6:28) USM – Carl Chester 52-yard pass from Braylon Braxton, Creighton Wilbanks kick (Drive: 1 play, 52 yards, 0:09; South Alabama 14–7)
- (2:28) USA – Kentrel Bullock 26-yard run, Davis Little kick (Drive: 8 plays, 75 yards, 4:00; South Alabama 21–7)

Third quarter

- (14:15) USA – Bishop Davenport 1-yard run, Davis Little kick (Drive: 2 plays, 1 yard, 0:36; South Alabama 28–7)
- (9:20) USA – Bishop Davenport 7-yard run, Davis Little kick (Drive: 8 plays, 58 yards, 3:14; South Alabama 35–7)
- (3:04) USM – Jeffery Pittman 1-yard run, Creighton Wilbanks kick (Drive: 17 plays, 75 yards, 6:16; South Alabama 35–14)

Fourth quarter

- (8:32) USM – Carl Chester 11-yard pass from Braylon Braxton, Creighton Wilbanks kick (Drive: 8 plays, 63 yards, 2:12; South Alabama 35–21)
- (7:25) USA – Kentrel Bullock 64-yard run, Davis Little kick (Drive: 2 plays, 75 yards, 1:07; South Alabama 42–21)
- (6:35) USM – Micah Davis 29-yard pass from Braylon Braxton, Creighton Wilbanks kick (Drive: 4 plays, 75 yards, 0:50; South Alabama 42–28)
- (0:54) USM – Jaylin Carter 1-yard run, Creighton Wilbanks kick (Drive: 12 plays, 94 yards, 1:55; South Alabama 42–35)

Statistics	USM	USA
First downs	24	26
Plays–yards	75–441	78–449
Rushes–yards	23–41	52–263
Passing yards	400	186
Passing: Comp–Att–Int	31–52–1	23–26–0
Turnovers	1	0
Time of possession	22:43	37:17

Team	Category	Player	Statistics
Southern Miss	Passing	Braylon Braxton	31/52, 400 yards, 3 TD, INT
Southern Miss	Rushing	Jeffery Pittman	12 carries, 41 yards, TD
Southern Miss	Receiving	Carl Chester	5 receptions, 128 yards, 2 TD
South Alabama	Passing	Bishop Davenport	20/23, 151 yards
South Alabama	Rushing	Kentrel Bullock	23 carries, 187 yards, 3 TD
South Alabama	Receiving	Jeremy Scott	4 receptions, 41 yards

=== at Texas State ===
South Alabama Jaguars (4–7) at Texas State Bobcats (5–6) – Game summary

Quarter	1	2	3	4	Total
Jaguars	7	0	0	19	26
Bobcats	10	11	14	14	49

at UFCU Stadium • San Marcos, TX

- Date: November 29, 2025
- Game time: 2:00 p.m. CDT
- Game weather: Sunny • Temperature: 76 °F (24 °C)
- Game attendance: 16,169
- Referee: Trennis Livingston
- TV announcers (ESPN+): Brant Freeman (play-by-play) and Keith Moreland (analyst)

Game information

First quarter

- (10:23) TXST – Tyler Robles 36-yard field goal (Drive: 12 plays, 67 yards, 4:29; Texas State 3–0)
- (4:40) TXST – Brad Jackson 19-yard run, Tyler Robles kick (Drive: 3 plays, 69 yards, 1:08; Texas State 10–0)
- (1:38) USA – Kentrel Bullock 1-yard run, Davis Little kick (Drive: 8 plays, 75 yards, 3:02; Texas State 10–7)

Second quarter

- (11:08) TXST – Tyler Robles 31-yard field goal (Drive: 14 plays, 73 yards, 5:25; Texas State 13–7)
- (1:08) TXST – Lincoln Pare 32-yard pass from Brad Jackson, Titus Lyons pass (Drive: 2 plays, 60 yards, 0:18; Texas State 21–7)

Third quarter

- (8:03) TXST – Brad Jackson 8-yard run, Tyler Robles kick (Drive: 11 plays, 69 yards, 4:29; Texas State 28–7)
- (4:48) TXST – Beau Sparks 50-yard pass from Brad Jackson, Tyler Robles kick (Drive: 1 play, 50 yards, 0:09; Texas State 35–7)

Fourth quarter

- (12:46) TXST – Brad Jackson 6-yard run, Tyler Robles kick (Drive: 13 plays, 70 yards, 6:13; Texas State 42–7)
- (6:20) USA – Keenan Phillips 1-yard run, Davis Little kick (Drive: 14 plays, 75 yards, 6:26; Texas State 42–14)
- (6:06) TXST – Jaylen Jenkins 100-yard kickoff return, Tyler Robles kick (Texas State 49–14)
- (4:07) USA – Trae'von Dunbar 34-yard run (Drive: 5 plays, 57 yards, 1:53; Texas State 49–20)
- (3:55) USA – Jeremy Scott 35-yard pass from Jared Hollins (Drive: 1 play, 35 yards, 0:07; Texas State 49–26)

Statistics	USA	TXST
First downs	22	26
Plays–yards	70–362	69–544
Rushes–yards	38–205	43–263
Passing yards	157	281
Passing: Comp–Att–Int	20–32–1	20–26–0
Turnovers	1	2
Time of possession	29:11	30:49

Team	Category	Player	Statistics
South Alabama	Passing	Bishop Davenport	13/21, 96 yards, INT
South Alabama	Rushing	Kentrel Bullock	15 carries, 84 yards, TD
South Alabama	Receiving	Devin Voisin	7 receptions, 52 yards
Texas State	Passing	Brad Jackson	20/26, 281 yards, 2 TD
Texas State	Rushing	Brad Jackson	13 carries, 113 yards, 3 TD
Texas State	Receiving	Chris Dawn Jr.	8 receptions, 154 yards
