= Dexter Davis (defensive back) =

American football player (born 1970)

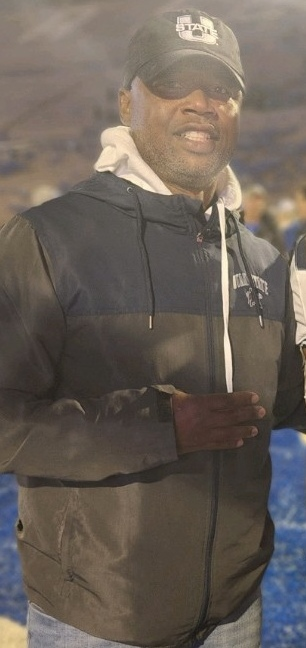
- Davin in 2023

No. 48, 21, 29
- Position: Defensive back

Personal information
- Born: March 20, 1970 (age 56); Brooklyn, New York, U.S.
- Listed height: 5 ft 10 in (1.78 m)
- Listed weight: 190 lb (86 kg)

Career information
- High school: Sumter (Sumter, South Carolina)
- College: Clemson
- NFL draft: 1991: 4th round, 86th overall pick

Career history
- Phoenix Cardinals (1991–1993); Los Angeles/St. Louis Rams (1993–1996)

Awards and highlights
- First-team All-ACC (1990); Second-team All-ACC (1989)

Career NFL statistics
- Tackles: 58
- Interceptions: 2
- Fumble recoveries: 4
- Stats at Pro Football Reference

Dexter Wendell Jackson Davis (born March 20, 1970) is an American former professional football player who was a defensive back for the Phoenix Cardinals and Los Angeles/St. Louis Rams of the National Football League (NFL). He played college football for the Clemson Tigers.

He founded the South Carolina Chapter of the National Football League Alumni and is currently acting as president.

== Early life and education ==
Davis played high school football at Sumter High School. He then attended and played college football at Clemson University from 1988–1990. In his collegiate career, he had 10 interceptions including a touchdown from one of them. He was also a punt returner, having 37 punt returns for 269 yards.

== Collegiate career ==
Davis was an all ACC defensive back at Clemson University. Davis was a starter on Clemson’s defenses between 1988–90, when the Tigers had a 10-2 record and finished in the top 12 of the Associated Press poll each year. The 1988 team won the ACC championship, as Davis became the first Tiger first-year freshman to start at cornerback under Head Coach Danny Ford.

He was named a first-team freshman All-American by Sporting News and his final pass breakup of the season was a game-saver in the end zone that clinched Clemson’s 13-6 win over Oklahoma in the Citrus Bowl.

In 1989, Davis started all 12 games and was named second-team All-ACC by UPI. He accumulated 55 tackles, three interceptions and 16 pass breakups. As a junior in the 1990 season, Davis had a career-high 85 tackles and led the ACC in interceptions (6). That 1990 defense was Clemson’s first to lead the nation in total defense.

== Professional career ==
=== Phoenix Cardinals ===
Davis was selected by the Cardinals in the fourth round of the 1991 NFL draft with the 86th pick overall. He spent his first three years with them. He played in 33 games and started in 3 of them. He had 33 tackles and 2 interceptions while on the team.

=== Los Angeles/St. Louis Rams ===
Davis spent the last 3 years of his career playing with the Rams. He played in 26 games and started in 3. He had 25 tackles while on the team.

== Legacy and awards ==
In 2022, Clemson University honored Davis with the Brian Dawkins Lifetime Achievement Award.

== Personal life ==
Davis is married and has four children. His son, Micah J. Davis, plays football for Utah State.
