= Micah J. Davis =

American football player

Micah Davis
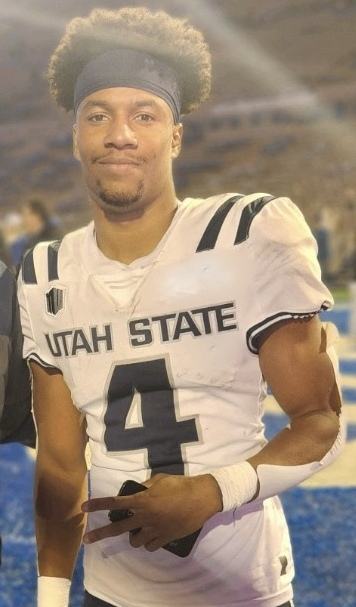
- Micah J Davis

Southern Miss Golden Eagles
- Position: Wide receiver
- Class: Redshirt Senior

Personal information
- Listed height: 5 ft 11 in (1.80 m)
- Listed weight: 185 lb (84 kg)

Career information
- High school: Harrison (Kennesaw, Georgia)
- College: Air Force (2020–2021); Iowa Western (2022); Utah State (2023); Ole Miss (2024); Southern Miss (2025–present)
- Stats at ESPN

Micah J. Davis is an American college football wide receiver for the Southern Miss Golden Eagles. He is the son of Dexter Davis, a retired professional football player with the National Football League (NFL).

== Early life ==
Davis is a 2019 graduate of Harrison High School in Kennesaw, Georgia, where he played both baseball and football.

As a varsity baseball player, Davis was a shortstop and relief pitcher. In 2019, Harrison High School's baseball team was ranked #1 in 6-6A Region 9 of Georgia High School Association with a 15–1 record. They lost in game three of the semi-finals of the 2019 state baseball championship to defending champion, Pope High School. As a shortstop, Davis was ranked #23 in the state. He was a baseball player for three seasons. On, October 14, 2017, when he attended the Under Armor Showcase at Baseball Factory, the scouting report mentioned that he had just ran a 90-yard kick-off return for a touch down the previous night and ran a 60-yard dash in 6.68 seconds.

At Harrison, Davis was a captain of the varsity football team, and played both offense as a running back and defensive back like his father, Dexter. Davis earned Player of the Game awards at least eight times in his junior and senior seasons. Davis caught 38 passes for 10 touchdowns from Justin Fields, who was the quarterback at the time.

High School Football Awards
Date	Award	Position	Opponent
Sept 5, 2017	Player of the Game	Special Teams	River Ridge High School
Sept 17, 2017	Player of the Game	Special Teams	Allatoona High School
October 6, 2017	Player of the Game	Offense	Sprayberry High School
October 13, 2017	Player of the Game	Special Teams	South Cobb
November 3, 2017	Player of the Game	Special Teams	Creekview
November 10, 2017	Player of the Game	Offense	Robert S. Alexander HS
August 31, 2018	Player of the Game	Special Teams	River Ridge High School
Sept 7, 2018	Player of the Game	Special Teams	South Cobb HS

On November 16, 2018, he scored a 33-yard touchdown against Lanier High School During his senior season 2018–2019, Davis played in eight games and had a total of 1,038 total yards, with an average of 129.8 yards per game. Out of only eight games that season he had 333 rushing yards, and 664 receiving yards and a total of 12 touchdowns.

== College career ==
Upon graduation, Davis attended the US Air Force Academy in Colorado, and majored in business administration and played wide receiver from 2020 to 2021. As a second-year player, Davis gathered 581 yards in total offense from 57 attempts, comprising 47 rushes and 10 receptions. He found the end zone six times and achieved over 100 yards in three of Air Force's initial four games. However, his playing time was curtailed by injuries, restricting him to eight games.

In 2022, Davis transferred to Iowa Western Community College, where he averaged 24.1 yards for 33 receptions and two touchdowns. He also amassed a total of 289 yards for the season.

In 2023, Davis transferred to Utah State University, where he averaged 17.4 yards for 36 receptions and six touchdowns. He also amassed a total of 628 yards for the season. He led the country with 28 punt returns.

In 2024, Davis entered the transfer portal after the firing of Utah’s coach Blake Anderson.

AWARDS:

- Honorable Mention All-Mountain West - Wide Receiver (2023)
- Honorable Mention All Mountain West - Punt Returner (2023)

== Personal life ==
Davis is the son of LaShea and Dexter Davis a former defensive back in the National Football League.
