= Kentrel Bullock =

American football player (born 2002)

No. 31 – Cincinnati Bengals
- Position: Running back
- Roster status: Practice squad

Personal information
- Born: March 31, 2002 (age 24)
- Listed height: 5 ft 10 in (1.78 m)
- Listed weight: 204 lb (93 kg)

Career information
- High school: Columbia (Columbia, Mississippi)
- College: Ole Miss (2020–2022); South Alabama (2023–2025)
- NFL draft: 2026: undrafted

Career history
- Cincinnati Bengals (2026–present)*
- * Offseason or practice squad member only

Awards and highlights
- First-team All-Sun Belt (2025)
- Stats at Pro Football Reference

Kentrel Lashun Devonte Bullock (born March 31, 2002) is an American professional football running back for the Cincinnati Bengals of the National Football League (NFL). He played college football for the Ole Miss Rebels and South Alabama Jaguars.

== Early life ==
Bullock grew up in Columbia, Mississippi and attended Columbia High School, where he lettered in football, basketball and track. As a senior, he amassed 1,966 yards rushing and 33 total touchdowns, along with leading the team to the 3A South State title game. He was named on the first team Class 3A all-state by the Clarion Ledger. He was a four-star rated recruit and committed to play college football at the University of Mississippi.

== College career ==
=== Ole Miss ===
As a freshman in 2020, Bullock played in six games, primarily on special teams. He tallied two carries for 11 yards.

During the 2021 season, he played in six games as both a reserve running back and on special teams. He tallied 17 carries, for 78 total yards and averaged 13 yards per carry and hauled in one pass reception.

During the 2022 season, he played in three games exclusively on special teams, but did not register any stats. He tallied a total of seven snaps on special teams against Troy and appeared on the punt coverage unit against Kentucky.

On November 27, 2022, Bullock announced that he would enter the transfer portal.

=== South Alabama ===
On January 9, 2023, Bullock announced that he would transfer to South Alabama.

During the 2023 season, he played in 11 games and started two of them, where he ran the ball 83 times on the year for 448 yards and four touchdowns. He also caught 15 passes for 106 total yards and a score and would return 11 kicks for 210 yards with a long return of 33 yards.

During the 2024 season, he played in all 13 games and started 12 of them, where he rushed for 894 yards and seven touchdowns on 152 carries. He also caught 15 passes for 153 yards and a touchdown.

During the 2025 season, he played in and started all 12 games, finishing the season with 1,085 yards and 14 total rushing touchdowns. He was named on First-Team All-Sun Belt Conference honors and became the program's new single-season rushing yards record holder.

Bullock would receive an invitation to participate in the East–West Shrine Bowl.

== Professional career ==
Pre-draft measurables
Height	Weight	Arm length	Hand span	Wingspan	40-yard dash	10-yard split	20-yard split	20-yard shuttle	Three-cone drill	Vertical jump	Broad jump
5 ft 9 7/8 in (1.77 m)	196 lb (89 kg)	30 5/8 in (0.78 m)	10 3/4 in (0.27 m)	6 ft 1 in (1.85 m)	4.53 s	1.63 s	2.61 s	4.27 s	7.25 s	33.5 in (0.85 m)	10 ft 8 in (3.25 m)
All values from Pro Day

On May 8, 2026, Bullock signed with the Cincinnati Bengals as an undrafted free agent. On August 30, Bullock was waived by Cincinnati as a part of final roster cuts; he was re-signed to the team's practice squad the next day.
