= 2026 Boston College Eagles football team =

American college football season

2026 Boston College Eagles football
- Conference: Atlantic Coast Conference
- Record: 5–6 (3–4 ACC)
- Head coach: Bill O'Brien (3rd season)
- Offensive scheme: Spread
- Defensive coordinator: Ted Roof (1st season)
- Base defense: 4–3
- Home stadium: Alumni Stadium

2026 Atlantic Coast Conference football standings
	Conf.			Overall
Team	W		L	W		L
No. 7 Miami (FL) y	8	–	0	10	–	1
No. 11 Wake Forest y	7	–	1	10	–	1
No. 23 Louisville	7	–	2	8	–	3
Clemson	5	–	3	7	–	4
SMU	5	–	3	7	–	4
Duke	4	–	4	7	–	4
Stanford	4	–	4	6	–	5
Virginia	4	–	4	6	–	5
Boston College	3	–	4	5	–	6
Pittsburgh	3	–	5	6	–	5
Virginia Tech	3	–	5	6	–	5
NC State	3	–	5	5	–	6
Florida State	3	–	5	5	–	6
Syracuse	3	–	6	5	–	6
North Carolina	2	–	5	5	–	6
California	2	–	6	3	–	8
Georgia Tech	2	–	6	3	–	8
Championship: Miami (FL) vs. Wake Forest
^ – College Football Playoff participant; $ – Conference champion; y – Championship game participant; As of November 22, 2026; Rankings from CFP rankings

The 2026 Boston College Eagles football team represents Boston College as a member of the Atlantic Coast Conference (ACC) during the 2026 NCAA Division I FBS football season. The Eagles are led by Bill O'Brien in his third season as their head coach. They play their home games at Alumni Stadium located in Chestnut Hill, Massachusetts.

== Schedule ==
Date	Time	Opponent	Site	TV	Result	Attendance
September 5	3:30 p.m.	at Cincinnati*	Nippert Stadium; Cincinnati, OH	FOX	L 15–34	37,097
September 11	7:30 p.m.	Rutgers*	Alumni Stadium; Chestnut Hill, MA	ESPN2	W 28–21	40,611
September 19	2:00 p.m.	Maine*	Alumni Stadium; Chestnut Hill, MA	ACCNX	W 22–16	35,605
September 26	12:00 p.m.	Virginia Tech	Alumni Stadium; Chestnut Hill, MA (rivalry)	ACCN	L 14–21	22,624
October 3	12:00 p.m.	at No. 21 SMU	Gerald J. Ford Stadium; University Park, TX	The CW	L 16–25	27,942
October 17	12:00 p.m.	Pittsburgh^{†}	Alumni Stadium; Chestnut Hill, MA	ESPN2	W 27–21	32,847
October 24	3:30 p.m.	at Georgia Tech	Bobby Dodd Stadium; Atlanta, GA	ACCN	W 49–27	47,239
October 31	12:00 p.m.	at Duke	Wallace Wade Stadium; Durham, NC	The CW	L 2–47	15,653
November 7	12:00 p.m.	Florida State	Alumni Stadium; Chestnut Hill, MA	ACCN	L 24–31	37,155
November 14	3:30 p.m.	at No. 5 Notre Dame*	Notre Dame Stadium; Notre Dame, IN (Holy War)	NBC	L 7–41	77,622
November 21	12:00 p.m.	Syracuse	Alumni Stadium; Chestnut Hill, MA	ACCN	W 27–15	35,109
November 28	12:00 p.m.	at Miami (FL)	Hard Rock Stadium; Miami Gardens, FL	ESPN		
*Non-conference game; ^{†}Homecoming; Rankings from AP Poll (and CFP Rankings, after November 3) – Released prior to game; All times are in Eastern time

== Game summaries ==
=== at Cincinnati ===
Boston College Eagles (0–0) at Cincinnati Bearcats (0–0) – Game summary

Quarter	1	2	3	4	Total
Eagles	0	0	8	7	15
Bearcats	3	7	14	10	34

at Nippert Stadium • Cincinnati, Ohio

- Date: September 5
- Game time: 3:30 p.m. EDT
- Game weather: Sunny • Temperature: 90 °F (32 °C) • Wind: W at 6 miles per hour (9.7 km/h)
- Game attendance: 37,097
- Referee: Tim Hedgepeth
- TV announcers (FOX): Tim Brando (play-by-play), Devin Gardner (analyst), and Josh Sims (sideline)

Game information

First quarter

- CIN – Stephen Rusnak 54-yard field goal, 8:27. Bearcats 3–0. Drive: 8 plays, 41 yards, 3:46.

Second quarter

- CIN – JV Gibson 4-yard pass from JC French IV (Stephen Rusnak kick), 7:48. Bearcats 10–0. Drive: 13 plays, 80 yards, 6:29.

Third quarter

- CIN – JC French IV 4-yard run (Stephen Rusnak kick), 10:48. Bearcats 17–0. Drive: 10 plays, 75 yards, 4:12.
- CIN – JC French IV 4-yard run (Stephen Rusnak kick), 5:24. Bearcats 24–0. Drive: 7 plays, 55 yards, 3:10.
- BC – Evan Dickens 4-yard run (Mason McKenzie run), 2:01. Bearcats 24–8. Drive: 7 plays, 75 yards, 3:23.

Fourth quarter

- CIN – Stephen Rusnak 44-yard field goal, 5:00. Bearcats 27–8. Drive: 4 plays, 3 yards, 0:59.
- CIN – JC French IV 1-yard run (Stephen Rusnak kick), 1:58. Bearcats 34–8. Drive: 4 plays, 38 yards, 1:53.
- BC – Johnathan Montague Jr. 23-yard pass from Mason McKenzie (Luca Lombardo kick), 1:02. Bearcats 34–15. Drive: 3 plays, 82 yards, 0:51.

Statistics	BC	CIN
First downs	24	17
Plays–yards	73–388	61–339
Rushes–yards	38–165	46–254
Passing yards	223	85
Passing: comp–att–int	18–35–1	11–15–0
Turnovers	2	0
Time of possession	31:19	28:41

Team	Category	Player	Statistics
Boston College	Passing	Mason McKenzie	18/35, 223 yards, TD, INT
Boston College	Rushing	Mason McKenzie	20 carries, 78 yards
Boston College	Receiving	Javarius Green	6 receptions, 74 yards
Cincinnati	Passing	JC French IV	10/14, 77 yards, TD
Cincinnati	Rushing	Gi'Bran Payne	14 carries, 108 yards
Cincinnati	Receiving	JV Gibson	4 receptions, 54 yards, TD

=== vs. Rutgers ===
Rutgers Scarlet Knights (0–1) at Boston College Eagles (0–1) – Game summary

Quarter	1	2	3	4	Total
Scarlet Knights	0	7	7	7	21
Eagles	14	6	0	8	28

at Alumni Stadium • Chestnut Hill, Massachusetts

- Date: September 11
- Game time: 7:30 p.m. EDT
- Game weather: Sunny • Temperature: 75 °F (24 °C)
- Game attendance: 40,611
- Referee: Gregory Blum
- TV announcers (ESPN2): Mike Monaco, Jordan Rodgers and Dana Boyle

Game information

First quarter

- BC – Evan Dickens 19-yard run (Luca Lombardo kick), 10:42. Eagles 7–0. Drive: 5 plays, 34 yards, 2:26.
- BC – Mason McKenzie 10-yard run (Luca Lombardo kick), 5:15. Eagles 14–0. Drive: 4 plays, 77 yards, 2:02.

Second quarter

- BC– Luca Lombardo 30-yard field goal, 13:33. Eagles 17–0. Drive: 11 plays, 63 yards, 4:24.
- RUTG – Antwan Raymond 4-yard pass from AJ Surace (Dane Pizzaro kick), 1:55. Eagles 17–7. Drive: 15 plays, 72 yards, 8:29.
- BC – Luca Lombardo 46-yard field goal, 0:00. Eagles 20–7. Drive: 11 plays, 47 yards, 1:55.

Third quarter

- RUTG – KJ Duff 4-yard pass from AJ Surace (Dane Pizzaro kick), 2:37. Eagles 20–14. Drive: 7 plays, 52 yards, 4:10.

Fourth quarter

- BC – Dawson Pough 78-yard pass from Mason McKenzie (Mason McKenzie–Johnathan Montague Jr. pass), 7:06. Eagles 28–14. Drive: 5 plays, 92 yards, 2:21.
- RUTG – KJ Duff 60-yard pass from AJ Surace (Dane Pizzaro kick), 6:18. Eagles 28–21. Drive: 2 plays, 75 yards, 0:48.

Statistics	RUTG	BC
First downs	19	18
Total yards	384	402
Rushes–yards	41–154	32–150
Passing yards	230	252
Passing: comp–att–int	18–27–4	18–29–2
Turnovers	4	3
Time of possession	34:32	25:28

Team	Category	Player	Statistics
Rutgers	Passing	AJ Surace	18/27, 230 yards, 3 TD, 4 INT
Rutgers	Rushing	Antwan Raymond	27 carries, 134 yards
Rutgers	Receiving	KJ Duff	8 receptions, 137 yards, 2 TD
Boston College	Passing	Mason McKenzie	18/29, 252 yards, TD, 2 INT
Boston College	Rushing	Mason McKenzie	13 carries, 94 yards, TD
Boston College	Receiving	Dawson Pough	4 receptions, 106 yards, TD

=== vs. Maine (FCS) ===
Maine Black Bears (FCS) (1–2) at Boston College Eagles (1–1) – Game summary

Quarter	1	2	3	4	Total
Black Bears (FCS)	0	10	0	6	16
Eagles	16	3	3	0	22

at Alumni Stadium • Chestnut Hill, Massachusetts

- Date: September 19
- Game time: 2:00 p.m. EDT
- Game weather: Cloudy • Temperature: 66 °F (19 °C)
- Game attendance: 35,605
- Referee: Nate Black
- TV announcers (ACCNX): Cooper Boardman and Craig Haubert

Game information

First quarter
Second quarter
Third quarter
Fourth quarter

Statistics	ME	BC
First downs	18	18
Plays–yards	66–270	60–359
Rushes–yards	34–69	39–186
Passing yards	201	173
Passing: comp–att–int	22–32–2	14–21–2
Turnovers	3	2
Time of possession	30:09	29:51

Team	Category	Player	Statistics
Maine	Passing	Eddie Buehler	22/32, 201 yards, 2 TD, 2 INT
Maine	Rushing	Nick Laughlin	10 carries, 38 yards
Maine	Receiving	Evan Wallace	6 receptions, 46 yards
Boston College	Passing	Mason McKenzie	14/21, 173 yards, TD, 2 INT
Boston College	Rushing	Evan Dickens	15 carries, 102 yards, TD
Boston College	Receiving	Johnathan Montague Jr.	5 receptions, 72 yards, TD

=== vs. Virginia Tech ===
Virginia Tech Hokies (3–0) at Boston College Eagles (2–1) – Game summary

Quarter	1	2	3	4	Total
Hokies	0	3	3	15	21
Eagles	0	0	7	7	14

at Alumni Stadium • Chestnut Hill, Massachusetts

- Date: September 26
- Game time: 12:00 p.m. EDT
- Game weather: Rain • Temperature: 60 °F (16 °C) • Wind: NE at 39 miles per hour (63 km/h)
- Game attendance: 22,624
- Referee: Jon Noli
- TV announcers (ACCN): Wes Durham, Max Browne and Madison Fitzpatrick

Game information

First quarter

No scoring plays

Second quarter

- (00:16) VT – John Love 45-yard field goal (Drive: 13 plays, 48 yards, 2:29; Hokies 3–0)

Third quarter

- (11:58) VT – John Love 22-yard field goal (Drive: 4 plays, 6 yards, 1:30; Hokies 6–0)
- (09:52) BC – Mason McKenzie 5-yard run, Luca Lombardo kick (Drive: 5 plays, 75 yards, 2:06; Eagles 7–6)

Fourth quarter

- (11:09) BC – Mason McKenzie 2-yard run, Luca Lombardo kick (Drive: 9 plays, 67 yards, 5:04; Eagles 14–6)
- (08:05) VT – Marlion Jackson 14-yard pass from Ethan Grunkemeyer, Jeffrey Overton Jr. rush (Drive: 10 plays, 80 yards, 2:58; Tied 14-14)
- (04:58) VT – Jeffrey Overton Jr. 76-yard run, John Love kick (Drive: 1 play, 76 yards, 0:12; Hokies 21–14)

Statistics	VT	BC
First downs	23	13
Plays–yards	77–370	61–261
Rushes–yards	42–223	38–150
Passing yards	147	111
Passing: comp–att–int	22–35–0	11–23–0
Time of possession	28:40	31:20

Team	Category	Player	Statistics
Virginia Tech	Passing	Ethan Grunkemeyer	22/35, 147 yards, TD
Virginia Tech	Rushing	Jeffrey Overton Jr.	25 carries, 209 yards, TD
Virginia Tech	Receiving	Que'Sean Brown	8 receptions, 51 yards
Boston College	Passing	Mason McKenzie	11/23, 111 yards
Boston College	Rushing	Mason McKenzie	26 carries, 138 yards, 2 TD
Boston College	Receiving	Jaedn Skeete	2 receptions, 27 yards

=== at No. 21 SMU ===
Boston College Eagles (2–2) at No. 21 SMU Mustangs (3–1) – Game summary

Quarter	1	2	3	4	Total
Eagles	10	0	0	6	16
No. 21 Mustangs	6	7	6	6	25

at Gerald J. Ford Stadium • University Park, Texas

- Date: October 3
- Game time: 11:00 a.m. EDT
- TV announcers (The CW): Thom Brennaman, Jason Cabinda, and Wes Bryant

Statistics	BC	SMU
First downs	19	21
Plays–yards	65-322	62-218
Rushes–yards	33-114	32-58
Passing yards	208	160
Passing: comp–att–int	20-32	20-30
Time of possession	33:05	26:55

Team	Category	Player	Statistics
Boston College	Passing	Mason McKenzie	20-32, 208 yards, 2 TD
Boston College	Rushing	Mason McKenzie	21 carries, 74 yards
Boston College	Receiving	Evan Dickens	3 receptions, 45 yards, 1 TD
SMU	Passing	Kevin Jennings	20-30, 160 yards, 2 TD
SMU	Rushing	Kendrick Raphael	15 carries, 45 yards, 1 TD
SMU	Receiving	Jalen Cooper	5 receptions, 45 yards

=== vs. Pittsburgh ===
Pittsburgh Panthers (5–1) at Boston College Eagles (2–3) – Game summary

Quarter	1	2	3	4	Total
Panthers	0	0	0	0	0
Eagles	0	0	0	0	0

at Alumni Stadium • Chestnut Hill, Massachusetts

- Date: October 17
- Game time: TBD
- TV announcers (ESPN2): Anish Shroff, Jay Walker, and Morgan Uber

Statistics	PITT	BC
First downs	22	25
Plays–yards	64-392	68-398
Rushes–yards	39-199	40-103
Passing yards	193	295
Passing: comp–att–int	11-25-2	17-28-2
Time of possession	28:22	31:38

Team	Category	Player	Statistics
Pittsburgh	Passing	Corey Daily	11-25, 193 yards, 1 TD, 2 INT
Pittsburgh	Rushing	Damon Ferguson, Jr	17 carries, 119 yards
Pittsburgh	Receiving	Cataurus Hicks	5 receptions, 135 yards, 1 TD
Boston College	Passing	Mason McKenzie	17-28, 295 yards, 2 TD, 2 INT
Boston College	Rushing	Evan Dickens	15 carries, 57 yards, 1 TD
Boston College	Receiving	Landon Wright	2 receptions, 122 yards, 1 TD

=== at Georgia Tech ===
Boston College Eagles (3–3) at Georgia Tech Yellow Jackets (2–4) – Game summary

Quarter	1	2	3	4	Total
Eagles	0	0	0	0	0
Yellow Jackets	0	0	0	0	0

at Bobby Dodd Stadium • Atlanta, Georgia

- Date: October 24
- Game time: TBD
- TV announcers (ACCN): Roxy Bernstein, Dave Clawson, and Madison Hock

Statistics	BC	GT
First downs		
Plays–yards		
Rushes–yards		
Passing yards		
Passing: comp–att–int		
Time of possession		

Team	Category	Player	Statistics
Boston College	Passing		
Boston College	Rushing		
Boston College	Receiving		
Georgia Tech	Passing		
Georgia Tech	Rushing		
Georgia Tech	Receiving		

=== at Duke ===
Boston College Eagles (4–3) at Duke Blue Devils (5–2) – Game summary

Quarter	1	2	3	4	Total
Eagles	0	0	0	0	0
Blue Devils	0	0	0	0	0

at Wallace Wade Stadium • Durham, North Carolina

- Date: October 31
- Game time: TBD
- TV announcers (The CW): Thom Brennaman, Jason Cabinda, and Wes Bryant

Statistics	BC	DUKE
First downs		
Plays–yards		
Rushes–yards		
Passing yards		
Passing: comp–att–int		
Time of possession		

Team	Category	Player	Statistics
Boston College	Passing		
Boston College	Rushing		
Boston College	Receiving		
Duke	Passing		
Duke	Rushing		
Duke	Receiving		

=== vs. Florida State ===
Florida State Seminoles (3–5) at Boston College Eagles (4–4) – Game summary

Quarter	1	2	3	4	Total
Seminoles	0	21	0	10	31
Eagles	10	7	7	0	24

at Alumni Stadium • Chestnut Hill, Massachusetts

- Date: November 7
- Game time: 12:00 p.m.
- Game weather: Rain • Temperature: 57 °F (14 °C) • Wind: S at 6 miles per hour (9.7 km/h)
- Game attendance: 37,155
- Referee: Tim Hedgepeth
- TV announcers (ACCN): Jorge Sedano, Dave Clawson, and Anabella Hasselbeck

Game information

First Quarter

- BC - Bo MacCormack III 6 yd run (Luca Lombardo kick), 13 plays, 75 yards, TOP 07:22
- BC - Luca Lombardo 48 yd field goal, 7 plays, 13 yards, TOP 02:57

Second Quarter

- FSU - Ashton Daniels 4 yd run (Gabe Panikowski kick), 5 plays, 29 yards, TOP 01:38
- BC - Nedrick Boldin Jr. 29 yd pass from Mason McKenzie (Luca Lombardo kick), 8 plays, 75 yards, TOP 04:42
- FSU - Amari Thomas 20 yd run (Gabe Panikowski kick), 8 plays, 75 yards, TOP 03:21
- FSU - Gabe Panikowski 1 yd run (Gabe Panikowski kick), 12 plays, 63 yards, TOP 03:49

Third Quarter

- BC - Javarius Green 2 yd pass from Mason McKenzie (Luca Lombardo kick), 6 plays, 51 yards, TOP 03:30

Fourth Quarter

- FSU - Gabe Panikowski 22 yd field goal, 14 plays, 71 yards, TOP 05:49
- FSU - Amari Thomas 11 yd run (Gabe Panikowski kick), 14 plays, 90 yards, TOP 08:16

Statistics	FSU	BC
First downs	22	19
Plays–yards	71–380	61–320
Rushes–yards	45–202	30–148
Passing yards	178	172
Passing: comp–att–int	15–26–1	17–31–2
Turnovers	1	2
Time of possession	30:18	29:42

Team	Category	Player	Statistics
Florida State	Passing	Ashton Daniels	15–26, 178 yards, 1 INT
Florida State	Rushing	Amari Thomas	19 carries, 98 yards, 2 TD
Florida State	Receiving	Micahi Danzy	7 receptions, 86 yards
Boston College	Passing	Mason McKenzie	15–27, 166 yards, 2 TD, 1 INT
Boston College	Rushing	Bo MacCormack III	16 carries, 105 yards, 1 TD
Boston College	Receiving	Nedrick Boldin Jr.	2 receptions, 49 yards, 1 TD

=== at No. 5 Notre Dame (Holy War) ===
Boston College Eagles (4–5) at No. 5 Notre Dame Fighting Irish (8–1) – Game summary

Quarter	1	2	3	4	Total
Eagles	0	0	7	0	7
No. 5 Fighting Irish	7	24	7	3	41

at Notre Dame Stadium • Notre Dame, Indiana

- Date: November 14
- Game time: 3:30 p.m. EST
- TV announcers (NBC): Jason Benetti (play-by-play), Jason Garrett (analyst), Caroline Pineda (sideline reporter), and Terry McAulay (rules analyst)

Game information

First quarter
Second quarter
Third quarter
Fourth quarter

Statistics	BC	ND
First downs	9	24
Plays–yards	57-136	72-500
Rushes–yards	33-85	40-276
Passing yards	51	224
Passing: comp–att–int	8-24-1	21-32-1
Turnovers	2	2
Time of possession	24:28	35:32

Team	Category	Player	Statistics
Boston College	Passing	Mason Mckenzie	8-21, 51 yards, 1 INT
Boston College	Rushing	Mekhi Dodd	6 carries, 45 yards
Boston College	Receiving	Bo MacCormack III	3 receptions, 20 yards
Notre Dame	Passing	CJ Carr	20-28, 217 yards, 2 TD, 1 INT
Notre Dame	Rushing	Jonaz Walton	15 carries, 141 yards, 1 TD
Notre Dame	Receiving	Micah Gilbert	5 receptions, 86 yards, 1 TD

=== vs. Syracuse ===
Syracuse Orange (5–5) at Boston College Eagles (4–6) – Game summary

Quarter	1	2	3	4	Total
Orange	0	0	0	0	0
Eagles	0	0	0	0	0

at Alumni Stadium • Chestnut Hill, Massachusetts

- Date: November 21
- Game time: TBD

Statistics	SYR	BC
First downs		
Plays–yards		
Rushes–yards		
Passing yards		
Passing: comp–att–int		
Time of possession		

Team	Category	Player	Statistics
Syracuse	Passing		
Syracuse	Rushing		
Syracuse	Receiving		
Boston College	Passing		
Boston College	Rushing		
Boston College	Receiving		

=== at Miami (FL) ===
Boston College Eagles (5–6) at Miami Hurricanes (10–1) – Game summary

Quarter	1	2	3	4	Total
Eagles	0	0	0	0	0
Hurricanes	0	0	0	0	0

at Hard Rock Stadium • Miami Gardens, Florida

- Date: November 28
- Game time: TBD

Statistics	BC	MIA
First downs		
Plays–yards		
Rushes–yards		
Passing yards		
Passing: comp–att–int		
Time of possession		

Team	Category	Player	Statistics
Boston College	Passing		
Boston College	Rushing		
Boston College	Receiving		
Miami (FL)	Passing		
Miami (FL)	Rushing		
Miami (FL)	Receiving		

== Roster ==
2026 Boston College Eagles football team roster
Players
Coaches
Offense

Pos.	#	Name	Class
WR	1	Jaedn Skeete	RJr
RB	2	Nolan Ray	RJr
WR	3	Dawson Pough	So
WR	4	Javarius Green	RSo
WR	5	Jackson Wade	RJr
WR	6	VJ Wilkins	RSr
QB	7	Jake Coniglio	RFr
WR	8	Johnathan Montague Jr.	RSo
WR	9	Landon Wright	RSo
QB	10	Mason McKenzie	RJr
QB	11	Femi Babalola	Fr
QB	13	Enzo Arjona	RSr
QB	15	Grayson Wilson	RFr
WR	16	Nedrick Boldin Jr.	RFr
QB	18	Anthony Coellner	Fr
WR	19	Kelvin Brown Jr.	Fr
RB	20	Billy Barrett	Fr
RB	23	Evan Dickens	RJr
RB	24	Bo MacCormack III	So
RB	26	Sedric Addison	Fr
RB	29	Mekhi Dodd	RFr
WR	32	Michael Landolfi	RSo
RB	33	Anthony Ferrucci	RJr
WR	34	Duke Brennan	RFr
RB	35	Tim Longo	RFr
WR	37	Zach Schnorrbusch	RSo
WR	38	Will Graves III	RFr
TE	43	Griffin Collins	So
TE	46	Dominic DeSarno	RFr
TE	48	Zeke Moore	Sr
OL	50	Owen Snively	RSr
OL	51	Amir Johnson	RJr
OL	52	Judah Pruitt	RSo
OL	53	Trevon Humphrey	RSr
OL	54	Dean Ruksnaitis	Fr
OL	55	Robert Smith IV	So
OL	56	Jani Norwood	RSo
OL	57	DJ Williams	RFr
OL	63	Veguer Jean-Jumeau	RSo
OL	69	Marek Jin	Fr
OL	70	Reggie Jackson	RJr
OL	71	Kristian Phillips	RSr
OL	72	Bruno Werner	Fr
OL	73	Lawrence Iyalekhue	Fr
OL	74	Marc Antunes Jr.	Fr
OL	75	Pape Abdoulaye Sy	RSo
OL	77	Michael Crounse	RJr
OL	78	Souleye Diawara	RSo
WR	80	Reed Swanson	RJr
WR	81	Bryce Dopson	RJr
WR	82	DJ Biggins	Fr
TE	84	Brady Clough	RSo
TE	85	Kaelan Chudzinski	So
TE	86	Danny Edgehille	RSo
TE	87	Cameron Kossmann	RFr
TE	88	Bryce Lewis	RFr
TE	89	DJ Johnson	RFr

Defense

Pos.	#	Name	Class
DB	0	TJ Green	So
LB	1	Anthony Palano	RSo
DB	2	KP Price	Sr
DB	3	Max Tucker	Sr
DE	4	Kris Jones	RSo
DB	5	Marcus Upton	So
DL	6	Chris Marable Jr.	RJr
DB	7	Carter Davis	RJr
DL	8	Onye Nwosisi	RSr
DL	9	Josiah Griffin	RJr
DB	10	Syair Torrence	RSo
DB	11	Rae Sykes Jr.	So
DE	13	Demetrius Ballard	RSo
DB	14	Ashton Cunningham	So
DB	15	Gerald Green Jr.	Fr
DB	16	Isaiah Farris	RSr
DB	17	Da'Jon Green	Fr
DB	18	Kameron Howard	RJr
DB	19	Marcelous Townsend	RFr
LB	20	Justin Medlock	RSr
DB	21	Charleston Coldon	RFr
DB	23	Michael Mankaka	RSr
DB	26	Njita Sinkala	RFr
LB	27	Jordan Rodriguez	Fr
LB	28	Zacari Thomas	So
DB	29	Cameron Martinez	RSr
DB	30	Xavier Myers	Fr
DB	32	Charlie Comella	RSo
DL	33	Dominic Funke	Fr
DB	35	Chandler Jordan	So
LB	36	Bodie Kahoun	RSo
LB	37	Callen Beveridge	Fr
DB	38	Tommy Cusick III	RSo
DB	39	Zach Kelly	RJr
DL	41	Favor Bate	Jr
LB	42	Kemori Dixon	RSo
LB	44	Palaie Faoa	RJr
DB	45	Max Tejpaul	RFr
DB	46	James Magerko	RSo
DL	47	Caden Bowling	RSo
LB	50	Sean Howard	RSo
LB	51	Steve Klein	Fr
DL	52	Jackson Carlisle	Fr
LB	54	Juan Zabal	RSr
DL	55	Christian Hudson	So
DL	56	E'Lla Boykin	Jr
DL	59	Micah Amedee	So
DL	79	Alex DeGrieck	RSr
DL	88	Cameron McGee	Fr
DL	90	KJ Sampson	RJr
DL	91	Makai Byerson	RSo
DL	92	Demeterius Thompson	Fr
DL	93	Gavin Neil	Fr
DL	94	Jayzen Flint	RSo
DL	95	Mac Fitzgerald	Fr
DL	97	Chuck Nnaeto	RSr
DL	98	Israel Oladipupo	So
DL	99	Mason Leak	Fr

Special teams

Pos.	#	Name	Class
K	25	Andy Quinn	So
K	30	Sam Stone	RJr
LS	45	John Owens	GS
LS	49	Cooper Crook	RSo
K	90	Jonathan Hewitt	Fr
P	96	Bryce LaFollette	GS
K	99	Luca Lombardo	RSr

Head coach

- Bill O'Brien

Coordinators/assistant coaches

- Ted Roof – Defensive Coordinator
- Matt Thurin – Special Teams Coordinator/Safeties
- Ben Albert – Defensive Line
- Kurt Anderson – Offensive Line
- Joe Dailey – Wide Receivers
- Jonathan DiBiaso – Quarterbacks Coach
- Mike Hart – Running Backs
- Jules Montinar – Defensive Backs
- Dan O'Brien – Linebackers
- Craig Fitzgerald – Director of Football Performance
- Jackson McSherry – Director of Football Business Operations
- Andrew Schatz – Assistant Director of Football Operations
- Britney Pearson – Football Operations Assistant/Branding
- Joe Van Allen – Director of Rehabilitation- Football
- Michael Vigneau – Director - Sports Medicine, Football
- Emma Burgason – Associate Director - Sports Medicine
- Terarith Thay – Associate Director - Sports Medicine
- Paul Barry – Assistant Director - Sports Medicine
- Michelle Ramirez – Resident Athletic Trainer
- Samuel Geller – Resident Athletic Trainer
- Catherine Carbeck – Head Football Dietician
- Karmichael Dunbar – Assistant Strength & Conditioning
- Tevin Geddis – Assistant Strength & Conditioning
- Tim Jackson – Assistant Strength & Conditioning
- Steve Tatekawa – Assistant Strength & Conditioning
- Julian Rowe-Cohen – Assistant General Manager
- Ryan Roberts – Director of Player Personnel
- Kamryn Rodriguez – Director of Recruiting Operations
- Elizabeth Rubright – Assistant Director of On-Campus Recruiting
- Bryson Rosser – Assistant Director, Recruiting/Defensive Assistant
- Sean Guthrie – Director of Player Development
- Rob Chudzinski – Senior Offensive Analyst
- Nick McGriff – Special Teams Analyst
- Brent Alexander – Defensive Analyst
- Tito Pasqualoni – Defensive Analyst
- Jashon Cornell – Defensive Analyst
- Ryan Finck – Offensive Analyst
- Andrew Sartori – Offensive Analyst
- Eli Kosanovich – Offensive Analyst
- Andrew Breiner – Offensive Analyst
- Tanner Brandimarte – Offensive Graduate Assistant
- Dominic Cuono – Defensive Graduate Assistant
- Michael Butler – Defensive Graduate Assistant
- Nick Boucher – Head Equipment Manager - Football
- Casey O'Brien – Assistant Equipment Manager - Football
- Adam Ricketts – Director of Football Video
- Mitchell Jones – Assistant Director of Football Video
- Jordan Arnold – Manager of Creative Services- Football
- Danny Hynes – Creative Content Producer- Football
- Jared Shuster – Creative Content Producer- Football
- Lucas Smith – Assistant Director, Athletic Communications- Football

Legend

- (C) Team captain
- (S) Suspended
- (I) Ineligible
- Injured
- Redshirt

Roster
