= Fighting Scots =

Fighting Scots may refer to the nickname of athletic teams of several United States high schools and colleges/universities, including:

== Colleges and universities ==
- The College of Wooster in Wooster, Ohio
- Pennsylvania Western University, Edinboro in Edinboro, Pennsylvania
- Gordon College, Massachusetts
- Monmouth College in Monmouth, Illinois
- Macalester College in Saint Paul, Minnesota
- Alma College in Alma, Michigan
- Ohio Valley University in Vienna, West Virginia
- Maryville College in Maryville, Tennessee

== High schools ==
- Caledonia High School in Caledonia, Michigan
- Rim of the World High School in Lake Arrowhead, California
- Ben Lomond High School in Ogden, Utah
- Scotland County High School in Laurinburg, North Carolina
- Highland High School in Sparta/Marengo, Ohio
