= 2025 New Mexico State Aggies football team =

American college football season

2025 New Mexico State Aggies football
- Conference: Conference USA
- Record: 4–8 (2–6 CUSA)
- Head coach: Tony Sanchez (2nd season)
- Offensive coordinator: David Yost (1st season)
- Offensive scheme: Spread
- Defensive coordinator: Joe Morris (2nd season)
- Base defense: 4–2–5
- Home stadium: Aggie Memorial Stadium

2025 Conference USA football standings
	Conf.			Overall
Team	W		L	W		L
Kennesaw State y$	7	–	1	10	–	4
Jacksonville State y	7	–	1	9	–	5
Western Kentucky	6	–	2	9	–	4
Louisiana Tech	5	–	3	8	–	5
FIU	5	–	3	7	–	6
Missouri State	5	–	3	7	–	6
Delaware	4	–	4	7	–	6
Liberty	3	–	5	4	–	8
New Mexico State	2	–	6	4	–	8
Middle Tennessee	2	–	6	3	–	9
Sam Houston	1	–	7	2	–	10
UTEP	1	–	7	2	–	10
Championship: Kennesaw State 19, Jacksonville State 15
$ – Conference champion; y – Championship game participant

The 2025 New Mexico State Aggies football team represented New Mexico State University in Conference USA (CUSA) during the 2025 NCAA Division I FBS football season. The Aggies were led by Tony Sanchez in his second year as the program's head coach. The Aggies played home games at Aggie Memorial Stadium, located in Las Cruces, New Mexico.

== Offseason ==
=== Transfers ===
==== Outgoing ====
Player	Position	Destination
Ishmael Aceves	LB	Adams State
Shamarr Jackson	OL	Appalachian State
Mike Washington	RB	Arkansas
Jake Waltman	OL	Bryant
Tayden Barnes	DB	Cincinnati
Noah Arinze	DE	Coastal Carolina
Gabe Jones	DL	Colorado State
Mason Graham	TE	Houston Christian
Seth McGowan	RB	Kentucky
Shiyazh Pete	OL	Kentucky
Elijah Thomas	S	Lindenwood
Ziggy Loa	EDGE	Louisiana–Monroe
Justin Beadles	DL	Louisville
Rashad McKinley	CB	Minnesota State
Brandon Nunez	QB	Mississippi Valley State
Deuce Hogan	QB	Nicholls
Jordan Smith	WR	Nicholls
Rontravious Perry	LB	Norfolk State
Jai Rodriquez	OL	Northern Arizona
Cooper Sheehan	OL	Northern Arizona
Alex Lines	TE	Northwestern
Louie Canepa	OL	Oklahoma State
Josiah Cox	S	San Diego State
Angel Munoz	S	Southeast Missouri State
Latrell Neville	WR	Southeast Missouri State
Dominic Richardson	RB	Tulsa
Naki Fahina	DL	Utah State
Derek Burns	DE	UTEP
Da'Marcus Crosby	S	Virginia
Fallauga Peleti	LB	Washington State
Malaki Ta'ase	DL	Washington State
AJ Vaipulu	IOL	Washington State
Anthony LaFrance	OT	Wayne State
Jaxon Heil	S	Winona State
DaMarco Moorer	S	Unknown
Pierce Humpich	DE	Unknown
Isaiah Abeyta	WR	Unknown
Santino Marucci	QB	Unknown
Monte Watkins	RB	Unknown

==== Incoming ====
Player	Position	Previous school
Dominic Richardson	RB	Baylor
Demanuel Brown Jr.	DE	Boise State
Kadarius Calloway	RB	California
Gavin Harris	TE	Central Michigan
DJ Hill-Smith	S	Copiah–Lincoln CC
Josiah Jackson	DL	Davidson
Santos Valdez	IOL	East Texas A&M
Janik Ogunlade	IOL	Florida A&M
Alex Perry	WR	Hawaii
Walter Owens	S	Hinds CC
Armahn Hale	S	Kent State
Larry Jones	EDGE	Liberty
Obinna Okeke	DE	Louisiana Tech
AJ Williams	WR	Mary Hardin–Baylor
Logan Fife	QB	Montana
Ma'Kyi Lee	OT	North Texas
Bradley Vislisel	DE	Northern Iowa
David Barker	K	Prokick Australia
Malik Williams	OT	San Jose State
Lorenzo Smith	S	South Alabama
Lukas Ungar	TE	Stanford
Joshua Goines	TE	Tulane
Bernock Iya	S	Tyler JC
Dijon Stanley	RB	Utah
Gabe Peterson	DE	Utah State
Tyler King	WR	Wyoming

== Schedule ==
Date	Time	Opponent	Site	TV	Result	Attendance
August 30	7:00 p.m.	Bryant*	Aggie Memorial Stadium; Las Cruces, NM	ESPN+	W 19–3	10,058
September 6	7:00 p.m.	Tulsa*	Aggie Memorial Stadium; Las Cruces, NM	ESPN+	W 21–14	10,240
September 13	5:30 p.m.	at Louisiana Tech	Joe Aillet Stadium; Ruston, LA	ESPN+	L 14–49	13,235
September 27	2:00 p.m.	at New Mexico*	University Stadium; Albuquerque, NM (Rio Grande Rivalry)	Altitude	L 20–38	37,440
October 2	7:00 p.m.	Sam Houston	Aggie Memorial Stadium; Las Cruces, NM	CBSSN	W 37–10	9,089
October 14	5:00 p.m.	at Liberty	Williams Stadium; Lynchburg, VA	CBSSN	L 27–30	16,312
October 22	7:00 p.m.	Missouri State	Aggie Memorial Stadium; Las Cruces, NM	CBSSN	L 17–24 ^{OT}	8,790
November 1	1:30 p.m.	at Western Kentucky	Houchens Industries–L. T. Smith Stadium; Bowling Green, KY	ESPN+	L 16–35	15,023
November 8	2:00 p.m.	Kennesaw State^{†}	Aggie Memorial Stadium; Las Cruces, NM	ESPN+	L 21–24	11,473
November 15	2:15 p.m.	at No. 23 Tennessee*	Neyland Stadium; Knoxville, TN	SECN	L 9–42	101,915
November 22	1:00 p.m.	at UTEP	Sun Bowl; El Paso, TX (Battle of I-10)	ESPN+	W 34–31	16,677
November 29	1:00 p.m.	Middle Tennessee	Aggie Memorial Stadium; Las Cruces, NM	ESPN+	L 24–31 ^{OT}	7,381
*Non-conference game; ^{†}Homecoming; Rankings from AP Poll (and CFP Rankings, after November 4) - Released prior to game; All times are in Mountain time

== Game summaries ==
=== vs. Bryant (FCS) ===
Game One – Bryant Bulldogs (FCS) (0–0) at New Mexico State Aggies (0–0) – Game summary

Quarter	1	2	3	4	Total
Bulldogs (FCS)	3	0	0	0	3
Aggies	6	3	0	10	19

at Aggie Memorial Stadium • Las Cruces, New Mexico

- Date: August 30
- Game time: 7:00 p.m. MDT
- Game attendance: 10,058
- Referee: Brad Carrell
- TV announcers (ESPN+): Adam Young (play-by-play), Danny Knee (analyst) and Kelly Horyczun (sideline)

Game information

First quarter

- NMSU – PJ Johnson III 24-yard pass from Logan Fife (Ryan Hawk kick BLOCKED), 10:02. Aggies 6–0. Drive: 6 plays, 82 yards, 3:05.
- BRY – Bryce Soli 43-yard field goal, 4:08. Aggies 6–3. Drive: 13 plays, 49 yards, 5:54.

Second quarter

- NMSU – Ryan Hawk 41-yard field goal, 13:33. Aggies 9–3. Drive: 11 plays, 66 yards, 5:26.

Third quarter

- No scoring plays.

Fourth quarter

- NMSU – Ryan Hawk 27-yard field goal, 12:10. Aggies 12–3. Drive: 9 plays, 55 yards, 2:16.
- NMSU – Kadarius Calloway 17-yard run (Ryan Hawk kick), 6:20. Aggies 19–3. Drive: 6 plays, 61 yards, 3:07.

Statistics	BRY	NMSU
First downs	16	19
Plays–yards	68–255	63–305
Rushes–yards	35–68	32–76
Passing yards	187	227
Passing: Comp–Att–Int	20–33–1	14–31–1
Turnovers	1	1
Time of possession	31:18	28:10

Team	Category	Player	Statistics
Bryant	Passing	Brennan Myer	20/33, 187 yards, INT
Bryant	Rushing	Dylan Kedzior	8 carries, 28 yards
Bryant	Receiving	Aldrich Doe	5 receptions, 54 yards
New Mexico State	Passing	Logan Fife	14/31, 227 yards, TD, INT
New Mexico State	Rushing	Kadarius Calloway	12 carries, 50 yards, TD
New Mexico State	Receiving	Donovan Faupel	5 receptions, 99 yards

=== vs. Tulsa ===
Game Two – Tulsa Golden Hurricane (1–0) at New Mexico State Aggies (1–0) – Game summary

Quarter	1	2	3	4	Total
Golden Hurricane	0	0	7	7	14
Aggies	3	0	7	11	21

at Aggie Memorial Stadium • Las Cruces, New Mexico

- Date: September 6
- Game time: 7:00 p.m. MDT
- Game weather: Cloudy • Temperature: 74 °F (23 °C) • Wind: SE 7 mph
- Game attendance: 10,240
- Referee: Matt Overton
- TV announcers (ESPN+): Adam Young (play-by-play), Danny Knee (analyst) and Kelly Horyczun (sideline)

Game information

First quarter

- NMSU – Ryan Hawk 46-yard field goal, 1:34. Aggies 3–0. Drive: 4 plays, 13 yards, 2:33.

Second quarter

- No scoring plays

Third quarter

- TLSA – Baylor Hayes 24-yard run (Seth Morgan kick), 10:47. Golden Hurricane 7–3. Drive: 7 plays, 65 yards, 2:51.
- NMSU – Donovan Faupel 24-yard pass from Logan Fife (Ryan Hawk kick), 6:17. Aggies 10–7. Drive: 13 plays, 65 yards, 4:30.

Fourth quarter

- NMSU – Ryan Hawk 38-yard field goal, 11:38. Aggies 13–7. Drive: 15 plays, 41 yards, 7:49.
- TLSA – Brody Foley 18-yard pass from Baylor Hayes (Seth Morgan kick), 7:33. Golden Hurricane 14–13. Drive: 8 plays, 75 yards, 4:05.
- NMSU – Gavin Harris 15-yard pass from Logan Fife (P. J. Johnson III run), 3:23. Aggies 21–14. Drive: 11 plays, 75 yards, 4:10.

Statistics	TLSA	NMSU
First downs	24	19
Plays–yards	77–375	71–291
Rushes–yards	37–141	26–39
Passing yards	234	252
Passing: comp–att–int	27–40–2	28–45–0
Turnovers	3	1
Time of possession	29:10	30:50

Team	Category	Player	Statistics
Tulsa	Passing	Baylor Hayes	14/17, 135 yards, TD, INT
Tulsa	Rushing	Dominic Richardson	20 carries, 93 yards
Tulsa	Receiving	Zion Booker	9 receptions, 57 yards
New Mexico State	Passing	Logan Fife	27/44, 248 yards, 2 TD
New Mexico State	Rushing	Logan Fife	12 carries, 28 yards
New Mexico State	Receiving	Donovan Faupel	8 receptions, 78 yards, TD

=== at Louisiana Tech ===
Game Three – New Mexico State Aggies (2–0) at Louisiana Tech Bulldogs (1–1) – Game summary

Quarter	1	2	3	4	Total
Aggies	0	14	0	0	14
Bulldogs	10	17	0	22	49

at Joe Aillet Stadium • Ruston, Louisiana

- Date: September 13
- Game time: 5:30 p.m. MDT/6:30 p.m. CDT
- Game weather: Sunny, 88 °F (31 °C)
- Game attendance: 13,235
- Referee: Douglas Mercer
- TV announcers (ESPN+): Malcolm Butler (play-by-play), Luke McCown (analyst) and Madison Kaufman (sideline)

Game information

First quarter

- LT – John Hoyet Chance 55-yard field goal, 9:50. Bulldogs 3–0. Drive: 5 plays, 28 yards, 1:41.
- LT – Jalen Mickens 40-yard pass from Blake Baker (Drew Henderson kick), 5:36. Bulldogs 10–0. Drive: 7 plays, 91 yards, 2:28.

Second quarter

- LT – Andrew Burnette 11-yard run (Drew Henderson kick), 14:49. Bulldogs 17–0. Drive: 5 plays, 67 yards, 1:15.
- LT – Marlion Jackson 42-yard pass from Trey Kukuk (Drew Henderson kick), 10:23. Bulldogs 24–0. Drive: 9 plays, 75 yards, 3:28.
- NMSU – Brodrick Malone 41-yard pass from Logan Fife (Ryan Hawk kick), 9:46. Bulldogs 24–7. Drive: 2 plays, 75 yards, 0:37.
- NMSU – P. J. Johnson III 38-yard pass from Logan Fife (Ryan Hawk kick), 1:52. Bulldogs 24–14. Drive: 4 plays, 98 yards, 1:57.
- LT – John Hoyet Chance 27-yard field goal, 0:17. Bulldogs 27–14. Drive: 10 plays, 67 yards, 1:30.

Third quarter

- No scoring plays.

Fourth quarter

- LT – Jacob Bradford 20-yard fumble return (Drew Henderson kick), 12:24. Bulldogs 34–14.
- LT – Blake Baker 1-yard run (Blake Baker pass to Clay Thevenin), 9:34. Bulldogs 42–14. Drive: 4 plays, 49 yards, 2:06.
- LT – Omiri Wiggins 17-yard run (Drew Henderson kick), 9:06. Bulldogs 49–14. Drive: 1 play, 17 yards, 0:07.

Statistics	NMSU	LT
First downs	13	28
Plays–yards	50–309	85–574
Rushes–yards	17–26	65–353
Passing yards	283	221
Passing: comp–att–int	17–33–2	11–20–1
Turnovers	3	1
Time of possession	24:30	35:30

Team	Category	Player	Statistics
New Mexico State	Passing	Logan Fife	17/33, 283 yards, 2 TD, 2 INT
New Mexico State	Rushing	Dijon Stanley	5 carries, 18 yards
New Mexico State	Receiving	PJ Johnson III	7 receptions, 157 yards, TD
Louisiana Tech	Passing	Blake Baker	8/16, 182 yards, TD
Louisiana Tech	Rushing	Blake Baker	15 carries, 103 yards, TD
Louisiana Tech	Receiving	David Pierro	3 receptions, 64 yards

=== at New Mexico (Rio Grande Rivalry) ===
Game Four – New Mexico State Aggies (2–1) at New Mexico Lobos (2–1) – Game summary

Quarter	1	2	3	4	Total
Aggies	7	10	0	3	20
Lobos	7	7	10	14	38

at University Stadium • Albuquerque, NM

- Date: Saturday September 27, 2025
- Game time: 2:00 p.m. MDT
- Game weather: Cloudy • Temperature: 71 °F (22 °C) • Wind: SE at 16 miles per hour (26 km/h)
- Game attendance: 37,440
- Referee: Nolan Dumas
- TV announcers (Altitude): Robert Portnoy (play-by-play) and DonTrell Moore (analyst)

Game information

First quarter

- (9:21) NMSU – TJ Pride 34-yard pass from Donovan Faupel, Ryan Hawk kick (Drive: 3 plays, 49 yards, 1:11; New Mexico State 7–0)
- (3:56) UNM – Cade Keith 5-yard pass from Jack Layne, Luke Drzewiecki kick (Drive: 10 plays, 71 yards, 5:17; Tied 7–7)

Second quarter

- (14:14) NMSU – Ryan Hawk 47-yard field goal (Drive: 10 plays, 45 yards, 4:42; New Mexico State 10–7)
- (12:18) NMSU – Bernock Iya 42-yard fumble recovery, Ryan Hawk kick (New Mexico State 17–7)
- (9:27) UNM – Shawn Miller 31-yard pass from Jack Layne, Luke Drzewiecki kick (Drive: 8 plays, 75 yards, 2:51; New Mexico State 17–14)

Third quarter

- (9:55) UNM – Luke Drzewiecki 44-yard field goal (Drive: 10 plays, 49 yards, 5:05; Tied 17–17)
- (1:12) UNM – Dorian Thomas 24-yard pass from Jack Layne, Luke Drzewiecki kick (Drive: 4 plays, 84 yards, 2:01; New Mexico 24–17)

Fourth quarter

- (12:34) NMSU – Ryan Hawk 39-yard field goal (Drive: 8 plays, 53 yards, 3:38; New Mexico 24–20)
- (11:37) UNM – Keagan Johnson 41-yard pass from Michael Buckley, Luke Drzewiecki kick (Drive: 2 plays, 75 yards, 0:57; New Mexico 31–20)
- (5:09) UNM – Scottre Humphrey 8-yard pass from Jack Layne, Luke Drzewiecki kick (Drive: 8 plays, 38 yards, 4:58; New Mexico 38–20)

Statistics	NMSU	UNM
First downs	16	24
Plays–yards	68–304	69–476
Rushes–yards	30–15	38–132
Passing yards	289	344
Passing: Comp–Att–Int	21–38–1	24–31–0
Turnovers	1	2
Time of possession	27:55	32:05

Team	Category	Player	Statistics
New Mexico State	Passing	Logan Fife	20/37, 255 yards, INT
New Mexico State	Rushing	Kadarius Calloway	8 carries, 34 yards
New Mexico State	Receiving	Gavin Harris	6 receptions, 97 yards
New Mexico	Passing	Jack Layne	23/30, 303 yards, 4 TD
New Mexico	Rushing	Scottre Humphrey	13 carries, 41 yards
New Mexico	Receiving	Keagan Johnson	5 receptions, 117 yards, TD

=== vs. Sam Houston ===
Game Five – Sam Houston Bearkats (0–4) at New Mexico State Aggies (2–2) – Game summary

Quarter	1	2	3	4	Total
Bearkats	0	3	7	0	10
Aggies	0	10	3	24	37

at Aggie Memorial Stadium • Las Cruces, NM

- Date: Thursday October 2, 2025
- Game time: 7:00 p.m. MDT
- Game weather: Sunny • Temperature: 88 °F (31 °C) • Wind: N 6 mph
- Game attendance: 9,089
- Referee: Reed Brotherton
- TV announcers (CBSSN): Jack Gordon (play-by-play) and Taylor McHargue (analyst)

Game information

First quarter

- No scoring plays.

Second quarter

- (7:00) NMSU – Ryan Hawk 28-yard field goal (Drive: 15 plays, 87 yards, 8:20; New Mexico State 3–0)
- (2:45) NMSU – Logan Fife 1-yard run, Ryan Hawk kick (Drive: 5 plays, 53 yards, 2:48; New Mexico State 10–0)
- (0:35) SAM – Christian Pavon 51-yard field goal (Drive: 8 plays, 42 yards, 2:10; New Mexico State 10–3)

Third quarter

- (3:40) NMSU – Ryan Hawk 32-yard field goal (Drive: 6 plays, 66 yards, 3:16; New Mexico State 13–3)
- (0:01) SAM – Alton McCaskill 15-yard pass from Hunter Watson, Christian Pavon kick (Drive: 7 plays, 75 yards, 3:39; New Mexico State 13–10)

Fourth quarter

- (12:09) NMSU – Kadarius Calloway 3-yard run, Ryan Hawk kick (Drive: 8 plays, 75 yards, 2:52; New Mexico State 20–10)
- (11:05) NMSU – PJ Johnson III 4-yard pass from Logan Fife, Ryan Hawk kick (Drive: 3 plays, 2 yards, 1:00; New Mexico State 27–10)
- (4:56) NMSU – Ryan Hawk 45-yard field goal (Drive: 6 plays, 12 yards, 3:33; New Mexico State 30–10)
- (2:39) NMSU – Naeten Mitchell 71-yard interception, Ryan Hawk kick (New Mexico State 37–10)

Statistics	SHSU	NMSU
First downs	18	20
Plays–yards	65–313	57–350
Rushes–yards	26–69	31–95
Passing yards	244	255
Passing: Comp–Att–Int	27–39–1	19–26–0
Turnovers	3	1
Time of possession	30:15	29:45

Team	Category	Player	Statistics
Sam Houston	Passing	Hunter Watson	22/34, 222 yards, TD, INT
Sam Houston	Rushing	Alton McCaskill	12 carries, 38 yards
Sam Houston	Receiving	Landan Brown	7 receptions, 53 yards
New Mexico State	Passing	Logan Fife	19/26, 255 yards, TD
New Mexico State	Rushing	Kadarius Calloway	15 carries, 66 yards, TD
New Mexico State	Receiving	TK King	6 receptions, 132 yards

=== at Liberty ===
Game Six – New Mexico State Aggies (3–2) at Liberty Flames (2–4) – Game summary

Quarter	1	2	3	4	Total
Aggies	0	6	14	7	27
Flames	3	17	0	10	30

at Williams Stadium • Lynchburg, VA

- Date: Tuesday October 14, 2025
- Game time: 5:00 p.m. MDT
- Game weather: Clear • Temperature: 69 °F (21 °C) • Wind: NE 4 mph
- Game attendance: 16,312
- Referee: Rory Bernard
- TV announcers (CBSSN): Jordan Kent (play-by-play) and Adam Breneman (analyst)

Game information

First quarter

- (2:17) LIB – Jay Billingsley 28-yard field goal (Drive: 8 plays, 54 yards, 4:14; Liberty 3–0)

Second quarter

- (10:04) NMSU – Ryan Hawk 27-yard field goal (Drive: 13 plays, 67 yards, 7:07; Tied 3–3)
- (9:49) LIB – Julian Gray 96-yard kickoff return, Jay Billingsley kick (Liberty 10–3)
- (5:08) LIB – Evan Dickens 8-yard run, Jay Billingsley kick (Drive: 3 plays, 21 yards, 0:51; Liberty 17–3)
- (1:07) NMSU – Ryan Hawk 24-yard field goal (Drive: 10 plays, 68 yards, 4:01; Liberty 17–6)
- (0:11) LIB – Jay Billingsley 43-yard field goal (Drive: 7 plays, 33 yards, 0:56; Liberty 20–6)

Third quarter

- (8:43) NMSU – Kadarius Calloway 2-yard run, Ryan Hawk kick (Drive: 9 plays, 36 yards, 4:07; Liberty 20–13)
- (1:23) NMSU – Donovan Faupel 20-yard pass from Logan Fife, Ryan Hawk kick (Drive: 11 plays, 60 yards, 4:33; Tied 20–20)

Fourth quarter

- (12:19) NMSU – Brodie Malone-Bradford 20-yard pass from Logan Fife, Ryan Hawk kick (Drive: 6 plays, 40 yards, 2:32; New Mexico State 27–20)
- (8:21) LIB – Jay Billingsley 29-yard field goal (Drive: 4 plays, 3 yards, 0:51; New Mexico State 27–23)
- (0:36) LIB – Evan Dickens 8-yard run, Jay Billingsley kick (Drive: 13 plays, 92 yards, 3:10; Liberty 30–27)

Statistics	NMSU	LIB
First downs	23	19
Plays–yards	75–388	60–293
Rushes–yards	38–146	30–114
Passing yards	242	179
Passing: Comp–Att–Int	20–37–0	20–30–2
Turnovers	2	3
Time of possession	33:53	26:07

Team	Category	Player	Statistics
New Mexico State	Passing	Logan Fife	20/37, 242 yards, 2 TD
New Mexico State	Rushing	Kadarius Calloway	18 carries, 84 yards, TD
New Mexico State	Receiving	TK King	5 receptions, 68 yards
Liberty	Passing	Ethan Vasko	20/30, 179 yards, 2 INT
Liberty	Rushing	Evan Dickens	13 carries, 50 yards, 2 TD
Liberty	Receiving	Donte Lee Jr.	6 receptions, 55 yards

=== vs. Missouri State ===
Game Seven – Missouri State Bears (3–3) at New Mexico State Aggies (3–3) – Game summary

Quarter	1	2	3	4	OT	Total
Bears	7	0	10	0	7	24
Aggies	0	7	0	10	0	17

at Aggie Memorial Stadium • Las Cruces, NM

- Date: Wednesday October 22, 2025
- Game time: 7:00 p.m. MDT
- Game weather: Cloudy • Temperature: 73 °F (23 °C) • Wind: NE 4 mph
- Game attendance: 8,790
- Referee: Rodney Burnette
- TV announcers (CBSSN): John Sadak (play-by-play) and Patrick Peterson (analyst)

Game information

First quarter

- (9:45) MOST – Jeron Askren 9-yard pass from Jacob Clark, Yousef Obeid kick (Drive: 9 plays, 75 yards, 5:15; Missouri State 7–0)

Second quarter

- (11:40) NMSU – Isaiah Rudison 4-yard run, Ryan Hawk kick (Drive: 8 plays, 77 yards, 3:57; Tied 7–7)

Third quarter

- (10:45) MOST – Ramone Green Jr. 18-yard pass from Jacob Clark, Yousef Obeid kick (Drive: 5 plays, 58 yards, 3:00; Missouri State 14–7)
- (4:28) MOST – Yousef Obeid 32-yard field goal (Drive: 9 plays, 19 yards, 4:20; Missouri State 17–7)

Fourth quarter

- (5:23) NMSU – Ryan Hawk 25-yard field goal (Drive: 7 plays, 30 yards, 2:17; Missouri State 17–10)
- (1:49) NMSU – Donovan Faupel 11-yard pass from Logan Fife, Ryan Hawk kick (Drive: 5 plays, 65 yards, 0:34; Tied 17–17)

Overtime

- MOST – Ramone Green Jr. 18-yard pass from Jacob Clark, Yousef Obeid kick (Drive: 4 plays, 25 yards, 0:00; Missouri State 24–17)

Statistics	MOST	NMSU
First downs	22	20
Plays–yards	76–409	59–289
Rushes–yards	32–126	25–82
Passing yards	283	207
Passing: Comp–Att–Int	28–44–2	22–34–4
Turnovers	3	4
Time of possession	32:35	27:25

Team	Category	Player	Statistics
Missouri State	Passing	Jacob Clark	28/44, 283 yards, 3 TD, 2 INT
Missouri State	Rushing	Shomari Lawrence	21 carries, 97 yards
Missouri State	Receiving	Ronnel Johnson	6 receptions, 99 yards, TD
New Mexico State	Passing	Logan Fife	22/34, 207 yards, TD, 4 INT
New Mexico State	Rushing	Kadarius Calloway	10 carries, 50 yards
New Mexico State	Receiving	Donovan Faupel	10 receptions, 84 yards, TD

=== at Western Kentucky ===
Game Eight – New Mexico State Aggies (3–4) at Western Kentucky Hilltoppers (6–2) – Game summary

Quarter	1	2	3	4	Total
Aggies	3	3	3	7	16
Hilltoppers	0	14	14	7	35

at Houchens Industries–L. T. Smith Stadium • Bowling Green, KY

- Date: Saturday November 1, 2025
- Game time: 1:30 p.m. MDT
- Game attendance: 15,023
- Referee: Garrett Dickerson
- TV announcers (ESPN+): Tyler Eaton (play-by-play) and Terry Obee (analyst)

Game information

First quarter

- NMSU – Ryan Hawk 32-yard field goal, 1:00. Aggies 3–0. Drive: 7 plays, 38 yards, 2:12.

Second quarter

- NMSU – Ryan Hawk 27-yard field goal, 7:15. Aggies 6–0. Drive: 5 plays, 28 yards, 2:25.
- WKU – Matthew Henry 22-yard pass from Rodney Tisdale Jr. (John Cannon kick), 3:39. Hilltoppers 7–6. Drive: 8 plays, 75 yards, 3:36.
- WKU – Moussa Barry 21-yard pass from Rodney Tisdale Jr. (John Cannon kick), 1:14. Hilltoppers 14–6. Drive: 7 plays, 68 yards, 2:05.

Third quarter

- NMSU – Ryan Hawk 50-yard field goal, 9:49. Hilltoppers 14–9. Drive: 9 plays, 25 yards, 3:03.
- WKU – La'Vell Wright 5-yard run (John Cannon kick), 5:41. Hilltoppers 21–9. Drive: 4 plays, 44 yards, 1:52.
- WKU – Matthew Henry 11-yard pass from Rodney Tisdale Jr. (John Cannon kick), 2:40. Hilltoppers 28–9. Drive: 6 plays, 59 yards, 2:27.

Fourth quarter

- WKU – Jackson West 6-yard pass from Rodney Tisdale Jr. (John Cannon kick), 11:12. Hilltoppers 35–9. Drive: 11 plays, 59 yards, 5:30.
- NMSU – Stilton McKelvey 71-yard fumble return (Ryan Hawk kick), 1:25. Hilltoppers 35–16.

Statistics	NMSU	WKU
First downs	14	24
Plays–yards	66–178	79–429
Rushes–yards	26–66	38–128
Passing yards	112	301
Passing: Comp–Att–Int	13–40–1	30–41–1
Turnovers	1	2
Time of possession	26:14	33:46

Team	Category	Player	Statistics
New Mexico State	Passing	Logan Fife	13/39, 112 yards, INT
New Mexico State	Rushing	Isaiah Rudison	7 carries, 34 yards
New Mexico State	Receiving	Gavin Harris	3 receptions, 29 yards
Western Kentucky	Passing	Rodney Tisdale Jr.	30/38, 301 yards, 4 TD, INT
Western Kentucky	Rushing	La'Vell Wright	6 carries, 44 yards, TD
Western Kentucky	Receiving	K.D. Hutchinson	7 receptions, 83 yards

=== vs. Kennesaw State ===
Game Nine – Kennesaw State Owls (6–2) at New Mexico State Aggies (3–5) – Game summary

Quarter	1	2	3	4	Total
Owls	17	7	0	0	24
Aggies	0	7	0	14	21

at Aggie Memorial Stadium • Las Cruces, New Mexico

- Date: Saturday November 8, 2025
- Game time: 2:00 p.m. MST
- Game attendance: 11,473
- Referee: Reed Brotherton
- TV announcers (ESPN+): Adam Young (play-by-play) and Danny Knee (analyst)

Game information

First quarter

- KENN – Gabriel Benyard 34-yard pass from Amari Odom (Britton Williams kick), 12:36. Owls 7–0. Drive: 7 plays, 75 yards, 2:24.
- KENN – Gabriel Benyard 23-yard pass from Amari Odom (Britton Williams kick), 8:37. Owls 14–0. Drive: 6 plays, 65 yards, 2:17.
- KENN – Britton Williams 35-yard field goal, 7:33. Owls 17–0. Drive: 4 plays, 3 yards, 0:51.

Second quarter

- KENN – Clayton Coppock 55-yard pass from Amari Odom (Britton Williams kick), 8:27. Owls 24–0. Drive: 3 plays, 72 yards, 0:47.
- NMSU – Dijon Stanley 28-yard run (Ryan Hawk kick), 5:34. Owls 24–7. Drive: 6 plays, 62 yards, 2:47.

Third quarter

- No scoring plays.

Fourth quarter

- NMSU – Donovan Faupel 2-yard pass from Logan Fife (Ryan Hawk kick), 10:35. Owls 24–14. Drive: 10 plays, 85 yards, 3:17.
- NMSU – Donovan Faupel 2-yard pass from Logan Fife (Ryan Hawk kick), 5:28. Owls 24–21. Drive: 10 plays, 68 yards, 3:34.

Statistics	KENN	NMSU
First downs	21	26
Plays–yards	74–427	82–316
Rushes–yards	44–208	36–75
Passing yards	219	241
Passing: Comp–Att–Int	14–30–2	28–46–2
Turnovers	2	3
Time of possession	29:20	30:40

Team	Category	Player	Statistics
Kennesaw State	Passing	Amari Odom	14/30, 219 yards, 3 TD, 2 INT
Kennesaw State	Rushing	Coleman Bennett	16 carries, 86 yards
Kennesaw State	Receiving	Gabriel Benyard	3 receptions, 74 yards, 2 TD
New Mexico State	Passing	Logan Fife	28/46, 241 yards, 2 TD, 2 INT
New Mexico State	Rushing	Dijon Stanley	10 carries, 61 yards, TD
New Mexico State	Receiving	TK King	4 receptions, 49 yards

=== at No. 23 Tennessee ===
Game Ten – New Mexico State Aggies (3–6) at No. 23 Tennessee Volunteers (6–3) – Game summary

Quarter	1	2	3	4	Total
Aggies	0	3	0	6	9
No. 23 Volunteers	14	7	21	0	42

at Neyland Stadium • Knoxville, Tennessee

- Date: November 15
- Game time: 2:15 p.m. MST / 4:15 p.m. EST
- Game attendance: 101,915
- TV announcers (SECN): Dave Neal (play-by-play), Fozzy Whittaker (analyst), and Morgan Uber (sideline)

Game information

First quarter

- TENN – DeSean Bishop 1-yard run (Max Gilbert kick), 7:54. Volunteers 7–0. Drive: 4 plays, 59 yards, 1:05.
- TENN – Joey Aguilar 27-yard run (Max Gilbert kick), 5:43. Volunteers 14–0. Drive: 3 plays, 36 yards, 0:33.

Second quarter

- TENN – Braylon Staley 15-yard pass from Joey Aguilar (Max Gilbert kick), 11:24. Volunteers 21–0. Drive: 13 plays, 99 yards, 4:46.
- NMSU – David Barker 32-yard field goal, 1:25. Volunteers 21–3. Drive: 11 plays, 51 yards, 3:45.

Third quarter

- TENN – Star Thomas 21-yard run (Max Gilbert kick), 10:46. Volunteers 28–3. Drive: 11 plays, 75 yards, 4:14.
- TENN – Peyton Lewis 1-yard run (Max Gilbert kick), 2:35. Volunteers 35–3. Drive: 11 plays, 60 yards, 4:31.
- TENN – William Wright 35-yard interception return (Max Gilbert kick), 1:24. Volunteers 42–3.

Fourth quarter

- NMSU – Isaiah Rudison 1-yard run (David Barker kick failed), 7:57. Volunteers 42–9. Drive: 6 plays, 43 yards, 2:59.

Statistics	NMSU	TENN
First downs	24	22
Plays–yards	83–340	66–413
Rushes–yards	30–27	39–194
Passing yards	313	219
Passing: Comp–Att–Int	35–53–2	19–27–2
Turnovers	2	2
Time of possession	35:39	24:21

Team	Category	Player	Statistics
New Mexico State	Passing	Logan Fife	23/34, 166 yards, INT
New Mexico State	Rushing	Dijon Stanley	7 carries, 19 yards
New Mexico State	Receiving	Donovan Faupel	9 receptions, 80 yards
Tennessee	Passing	Joey Aguilar	17/23, 204 yards, TD, 2 INT
Tennessee	Rushing	DeSean Bishop	16 carries, 80 yards, TD
Tennessee	Receiving	Chris Brazzell II	3 receptions, 65 yards

=== at UTEP (Battle of I-10) ===
Game Eleven – New Mexico State Aggies (3–7) at UTEP Miners (2–8) – Game summary

Quarter	1	2	3	4	Total
Aggies	0	21	3	10	34
Miners	21	0	3	7	31

at Sun Bowl • El Paso, Texas

- Date: November 22
- Game time: 1:00 p.m. MST
- Game weather: Sunny, 67 °F (19 °C)
- Game attendance: 16,677
- Referee: Ron Hudson
- TV announcers (ESPN+): Andy Morgan (play-by-play), Ed Stansbury (analyst) and Paige Wood (sideline)
- Box score, Recap

Game information

First quarter

- UTEP – Skyler Locklear 1-yard run (Carlos Arreola kick), 9:58. Miners 7–0. Drive: 5 plays, 66 yards, 1:22.
- UTEP – Ashten Emory 30-yard run (Carlos Arreola kick), 9:42. Miners 14–0. Drive: 1 play, 30 yards, 0:06.
- UTEP – Wondame Davis Jr. 27-yard pass from Skyler Locklear (Carlos Arreola kick), 5:56. Miners 21–0. Drive: 4 plays, 41 yards, 1:05.

Second quarter

- NMSU – Donovan Faupel 8-yard pass from Adam Damante (David Barker kick), 14:57. Miners 21–7. Drive: 12 plays, 75 yards, 5:54.
- NMSU – Donovan Faupel 11-yard pass from Adam Damante (David Barker kick), 7:10. Miners 21–14. Drive: 9 plays, 80 yards, 4:56.
- NMSU – Dijon Stanley 57-yard run (David Barker kick), 5:15. Tied 21–21. Drive: 1 play, 57 yards, 0:08.

Third quarter

- NMSU – David Barker 46-yard field goal, 5:09. Aggies 24–21. Drive: 12 plays, 37 yards, 6:00.
- UTEP – Tanner Cragun 22-yard field goal, 0:06. Tied 24–24. Drive: 12 plays, 79 yards, 4:57.

Fourth quarter

- NMSU – David Barker 24-yard field goal, 10:20. Aggies 27–24. Drive: 13 plays, 66 yards, 4:46.
- UTEP – Kenny Odom 28-yard pass from Skyler Locklear (Carlos Arreola kick), 0:56. Miners 31–27. Drive: 12 plays, 97 yards, 3:23.
- NMSU – TK King 10-yard pass from Adam Damante (David Barker kick), 0:21. Aggies 34–31. Drive: 6 plays, 75 yards, 0:35.

Statistics	NMSU	UTEP
First downs	27	20
Plays–yards	81–470	64–399
Rushes–yards	39–194	34–248
Passing yards	276	151
Passing: Comp–Att–Int	30–42–1	16–30–1
Turnovers	2	1
Time of possession	36:44	23:16

Team	Category	Player	Statistics
New Mexico State	Passing	Adam Damante	29/41, 253 yards, 3 TD, INT
New Mexico State	Rushing	Dijon Stanley	11 carries, 106 yards, TD
New Mexico State	Receiving	Donovan Faupel	9 receptions, 78 yards, 2 TD
UTEP	Passing	Skyler Locklear	16/30, 151 yards, 2 TD, INT
UTEP	Rushing	Ashten Emory	18 carries, 181 yards, TD
UTEP	Receiving	Kenny Odom	8 receptions, 48 yards, TD

=== vs. Middle Tennessee ===
Game Twelve – Middle Tennessee Blue Raiders (2–9) at New Mexico State Aggies (4–7) – Game summary

Quarter	1	2	3	4	OT	Total
Blue Raiders	7	7	3	7	7	31
Aggies	7	0	7	10	0	24

at Aggie Memorial Stadium • Las Cruces, New Mexico

- Date: November 29
- Game time: 1:00 p.m. MST
- Game attendance: 7,381
- Referee: Reed Brotherton
- TV announcers (ESPN+): Adam Young (play-by-play), Danny Knee (analyst) and Kelly Horyczun (sideline)
- Recap

Game information

First quarter

- NMSU – TK King 64-yard pass from Adam Damante (Ryan Hawk kick), 2:39. Aggies 7–0. Drive: 4 plays, 77 yards, 2:21.
- MTSU – DJ Taylor 64-yard run (Jacob Hathaway kick), 1:45. Tied 7–7. Drive: 2 plays, 73 yards, 0:47.

Second quarter

- MTSU – AJ Jones 24-yard pass from Roman Gagliano (Jacob Hathaway kick), 0:15. Blue Raiders 14–7. Drive: 9 plays, 86 yards, 1:40.

Third quarter

- MTSU – Jacob Hathaway 25-yard field goal, 6:04. Blue Raiders 17–7. Drive: 4 plays, 5 yards, 1:24.
- NMSU – TK King 5-yard pass from Adam Damante (Ryan Hawk kick), 0:52. Blue Raiders 17–14. Drive: 11 plays, 75 yards, 5:12.

Fourth quarter

- NMSU – Adam Damante 1-yard run (Ryan Hawk kick), 11:49. Aggies 21–17. Drive: 7 plays, 82 yards, 2:55.
- MTSU – Landon Collins 19-yard pass from Roman Gagliano (Jacob Hathaway kick), 5:05. Blue Raiders 24–21. Drive: 4 plays, 56 yards, 2:41.
- NMSU – Ryan Hawk 35-yard field goal, 0:58. Tied 24–24. Drive: 13 plays, 57 yards, 4:07.

Overtime

- MTSU – AJ Jones 11-yard pass from Roman Gagliano (Jacob Hathaway kick). Blue Raiders 31–24. Drive: 5 plays, 25 yards.

Statistics	MTSU	NMSU
First downs	20	24
Plays–yards	76–459	74–395
Rushes–yards	33–199	27–84
Passing yards	260	311
Passing: Comp–Att–Int	24–43–0	29–47–2
Turnovers	1	3
Time of possession	30:33	29:27

Team	Category	Player	Statistics
Middle Tennessee	Passing	Roman Gagliano	24/42, 260 yards, 3 TD
Middle Tennessee	Rushing	Jekail Middlebrook	20 carries, 95 yards
Middle Tennessee	Receiving	Landon Collins	5 receptions, 81 yards, TD
New Mexico State	Passing	Adam Damante	29/44, 311 yards, 2 TD, 2 INT
New Mexico State	Rushing	Kadarius Calloway	9 carries, 37 yards
New Mexico State	Receiving	TK King	10 receptions, 178 yards, 2 TD
