= Caledonia Community Schools =

School district in Michigan

Address
- 8948 Kraft Ave SE Caledonia, Kent, Michigan, 49316; United States

District information
- Grades: PreK-12
- Superintendent: Dirk Weeldreyer
- Schools: 9
- Budget: US$98,771,000 (2022–23 expenditures)
- NCES District ID: 2607620

Students and staff
- Students: 4,598 (2024–2025)
- Teachers: 262.92 FTE (2024–25)
- Staff: 553.34 FTE (2024–2025)
- Student–teacher ratio: 17.49 (2024–25)

Other information
- Website: www.calschools.org

Caledonia Community Schools is a public school district in Kent County, Michigan in the Grand Rapids area. It serves Caledonia, part of Kentwood, and Caledonia Township and parts of Bowne, Cascade, and Gaines townships. It also serves part of Leighton Township in Allegan County and a part of Thornapple Township in Barry County.

== History ==
The present Caledonia High School was built in 2004. South Campus was completed in fall 2017. The designer of both buildings was GMB Architects. As part of the bond issue passed in 2020, a corridor was built to connect the two high school buildings. The former high school was repurposed as Duncan Lake Middle School.

In 2025, the Cal Community Center opened. The building has athletic facilities and houses a branch of the YMCA.

== Schools ==
Schools in Caledonia Community Schools district
School	Address	Notes
Caledonia High School	9050 Kraft Ave., Caledonia	Grades 9–12. Built 2004.
Duncan Lake Middle School	9758 Kraft Ave., Caledonia	Grades 7–8
Kraft Meadows Intermediate School	9230 Kraft Ave., Caledonia	Grades 5–6
Caledonia Elementary	9770 Duncan Lake Ave., Caledonia	Grades K–4
Dutton Elementary	3820 68th Street, Caledonia	Grades K–4
Emmons Lake Elementary	8950 Kraft Ave., Caledonia	Grades K–4
Kettle Lake Elementary	8451 Garbow Drive, Alto	Grades K–4
Paris Ridge Elementary	4690 Paris Ridge Drive, Caledonia	Grades K–4
Duncan Lake Early Childhood Center	9751 Duncan Lake Ave., Caledonia	Preschool
