= Bo MacCormack III =

American college football running back

No. 24 – Boston College Eagles
- Position: Running back
- Class: Sophomore

Personal information
- Listed height: 5 ft 10 in (1.78 m)
- Listed weight: 200 lb (91 kg)

Career information
- High school: Buckingham Browne & Nichols (Cambridge, Massachusetts)
- College: Boston College (2025–present)

Bo MacCormack III is an American college football running back for the Boston College Eagles.

== Early life ==
MacCormack is from Westford, Massachusetts. He was named after Bo Jackson. He first played football at age seven and originally attended Westford Academy before transferring to Buckingham Browne & Nichols School after his freshman year. MacCormack repeated his freshman year after transferring. He ran for 1,178 yards and 12 touchdowns as a freshman at Buckingham Browne & Nichols and 1,308 yards and 11 touchdowns as a sophomore.

MacCormack then posted 1,765 rushing yards and 31 touchdowns as a junior. He was NEPSAC Class A Player of the Year as a junior and then first-team all-league, all-conference, and the league MVP as a senior after running for 1,625 yards. MacCormack concluded his high school career as the all-time leading rusher in Massachusetts history, posting 6,699 rushing yards and 100 touchdowns. A three-star recruit, he initially committed to play college football for the Syracuse Orange before flipping to the Boston College Eagles.

== College career ==
In his first game at Boston College in 2025, MacCormack recorded a two-yard rushing touchdown. However, he saw little playing time in his freshman year as a backup to Turbo Richard and Jordan McDonald. He finished the season with 43 rushing yards and a touchdown. MacCormack saw more playing time in 2026, particularly after teammate Evan Dickens suffered a season-ending injury. In week eight, against Georgia Tech, he ran for 155 yards and three touchdowns, earning Atlantic Coast Conference (ACC) Running Back of the Week honors. Four weeks later, MacCormack ran for 236 yards and a touchdown in a win against Syracuse.
