= 2025 Western Kentucky Hilltoppers football team =

American college football season

2025 Western Kentucky Hilltoppers football

New Orleans Bowl champion

New Orleans Bowl, W 27–16 vs. Southern Miss
- Conference: Conference USA
- Record: 9–4 (6–2 CUSA)
- Head coach: Tyson Helton (7th season)
- Offensive coordinator: Rick Bowie (1st season)
- Offensive scheme: Air raid
- Defensive coordinator: Da'Von Brown (1st season)
- Co-defensive coordinator: Davis Merritt (1st season)
- Base defense: 3–3–5
- Home stadium: Houchens Industries–L. T. Smith Stadium

2025 Conference USA football standings
	Conf.			Overall
Team	W		L	W		L
Kennesaw State y$	7	–	1	10	–	4
Jacksonville State y	7	–	1	9	–	5
Western Kentucky	6	–	2	9	–	4
Louisiana Tech	5	–	3	8	–	5
FIU	5	–	3	7	–	6
Missouri State	5	–	3	7	–	6
Delaware	4	–	4	7	–	6
Liberty	3	–	5	4	–	8
New Mexico State	2	–	6	4	–	8
Middle Tennessee	2	–	6	3	–	9
Sam Houston	1	–	7	2	–	10
UTEP	1	–	7	2	–	10
Championship: Kennesaw State 19, Jacksonville State 15
$ – Conference champion; y – Championship game participant

The 2025 Western Kentucky Hilltoppers football team represented Western Kentucky University as a member of Conference USA (CUSA) during the 2025 NCAA Division I FBS football season. The Hilltoppers were led by Tyson Helton in his seventh year as the head coach. The Hilltoppers played home games at Houchens Industries–L. T. Smith Stadium, located in Bowling Green, Kentucky.

== Offseason ==
=== Transfers ===
==== Outgoing ====
Player	Position	Destination
Darrell Johnson Jr.	OL	Akron
Dallas Walker IV	DL	Auburn
Al Sandifer	DL	Austin Peay
Montreze Smith	LB	Austin Peay
Reginald Allen Jr.	LB	Bryant
Jaylen Hampton	WR	Charlotte
Ki'Shawn Harvey	DL	East Tennessee State
Wesley Horton	DL	East Tennessee State
Jalen Hand	DL	Eastern Kentucky
Gabriel Arnold	OL	Eastern Michigan
Easton Messer	WR	Florida Atlantic
Caden Veltkamp	QB	Florida Atlantic
Deante McCray	DE	Florida State
Elvin Fofanah	TE	Gardner–Webb
Jarvis Hayes	WR	Georgia Military
River Helms	TE	Georgia Southern
Turner Helton	QB	Georgia Southern
Trent Zappe	LB	Houston Christian
Hosea Wheeler	DL	Indiana
Alex Ford	DB	Kennesaw State
Marcus Patterson	DE	Kennesaw State
Evan Wibberley	OL	Kentucky
Brandon Buckhaulter	WR	Louisiana–Monroe
Darius Thomas	LB	Louisville
Jalil Rivera-Harvey	DL	Marshall
Reid Jamerson	DE	Minot State
LT Sanders	RB	North Alabama
Marvelous Owens	DB	Northeastern State
Jaymar Mundy	DB	Ohio
Lucas Carneiro	K	Ole Miss
Leavy Johnson	OL	South Alabama
Rodney Newsom Jr.	OL	South Carolina
T. J. Finley	QB	Tulane
Dallen Ponder	WR	Tulsa
Koy Moore	WR	UNLV
Mike Moment	OL	UT Martin
Demick Starling	WR	Utah State
Jayden Loving	DL	Wake Forest
Dave Herard	DB	Unknown
Ely George	LB	Unknown
Bryce Childress	WR	Unknown
Trace Patterson	TE	Unknown
Hayden Todd	OL	Unknown
Denzil Alleyne	WR	Unknown
Marshall Jackson	OL	Withdrawn
Moussa Berry	WR	Withdrawn
Kylan Guidry	DL	Withdrawn
Demarko Williams	DB	Withdrawn

==== Incoming ====
Player	Position	Previous school
Maverick McIvor	QB	Abilene Christian
Laurence Seymore	OL	Akron
Jakeem Fletcher	DL	Alabama State
Avarion Cole	DB	Appalachian State
La'Vell Wright	RB	Austin Peay
Nick Reimer	OL	Bowling Green
Bailey Sanders	LS	Buffalo
Kody Epps	WR	BYU
Jemeil Jackson	OL	Central Michigan
Jaavan Mack	CB	Charlotte
Jairus Mack	WR	Charlotte
Al-Ma'hi Ali	DB	Charlotte
Jaylen Wester	LB	Colorado
Montreze Smith	LB	Duke
Jackson West	TE	Florida State
Weston Wallace	OL	Georgia Southern
Jaden Hardy	DL	Grambling State
Jalen Emery	DB	Houston
Caleb McMickle	QB	Houston
Venson Sneed Jr.	DE	Indiana
Robby Harrison	DL	Indiana
Quincy Jenkins	OL	James Madison
Elin Jones	DL	Johnson C. Smith
Justin Wolf	TE	Kansas State
Elijah Williams	OL	Kent State
Devon Smith	OL	Louisiana–Monroe
Jayden Gray	DE	Louisiana Tech
Karsten Upchurch	OL	Mississippi State
Josaiah Knight	DE	Mississippi State
Mackavelli Malotumau	DL	Nevada
Eric Etienne	DL	Norfolk State
Kelby Williams	WR	Old Dominion
Markus Knight	DB	Old Dominion
Isaiah Myers	WR	Purdue
Dominic Oliver	DE	San Diego State
Zach Smith	LB	SMU
Braxton Myers	DB	Southern Miss
Rylen Su'a-Filo	DL	Southern Utah
Jaylen Lewis	DB	Temple
Jaden McGill	RB	Tennessee State
Brandon Buckhaulter	WR	UAB
Jack Cassidy	K	Ulster
John Cannon	K	USF
Caleb Nitta	OL	Virginia Tech
Matthew Henry	WR	Western Illinois
Quincy Burroughs	WR	Wisconsin

== Schedule ==
Date	Time	Opponent	Site	TV	Result	Attendance
August 23	6:00 p.m.	Sam Houston	Houchens Industries–L. T. Smith Stadium; Bowling Green, KY	CBSSN	W 41–24	15,312
August 30	6:00 p.m.	North Alabama*	Houchens Industries–L. T. Smith Stadium; Bowling Green, KY	ESPN+	W 55–6	12,226
September 6	6:00 p.m.	at Toledo*	Glass Bowl; Toledo, OH	ESPN+	L 21–45	24,138
September 20	6:00 p.m.	Nevada*	Houchens Industries–L. T. Smith Stadium; Bowling Green, KY	ESPN+	W 31–16	17,247
September 27	6:00 p.m.	at Missouri State	Robert W. Plaster Stadium; Springfield, MO	ESPN+	W 27–22	10,068
October 3	6:00 p.m.	at Delaware	Delaware Stadium; Newark, DE	CBSSN	W 27–24	19,176
October 14	7:00 p.m.	FIU	Houchens Industries–L. T. Smith Stadium; Bowling Green, KY	ESPNU	L 6–25	12,276
October 21	6:30 p.m.	at Louisiana Tech	Joe Aillet Stadium; Ruston, LA	CBSSN	W 28–27 ^{OT}	10,928
November 1	2:30 p.m.	New Mexico State^{†}	Houchens Industries–L. T. Smith Stadium; Bowling Green, KY	ESPN+	W 35–16	15,023
November 15	2:30 p.m.	Middle Tennessee	Houchens Industries–L. T. Smith Stadium; Bowling Green, KY (100 Miles of Hate)	ESPN+	W 42–26	16,547
November 22	6:45 p.m.	at LSU*	Tiger Stadium; Baton Rouge, LA	SECN	L 10–13	100,923
November 29	1:00 p.m.	at Jacksonville State	AmFirst Stadium; Jacksonville, AL	ESPN+	L 34–37	16,733
December 23	4:30 p.m.	vs. Southern Miss*	Caesars Superdome; New Orleans, LA (New Orleans Bowl)	ESPN	W 27–16	16,693
*Non-conference game; ^{†}Homecoming; All times are in Central time

== Game summaries ==
=== vs. Sam Houston ===
Game One – Sam Houston Bearkats (0–0) at Western Kentucky Hilltoppers (0–0) – Game summary

Quarter	1	2	3	4	Total
Bearkats	3	7	14	0	24
Hilltoppers	7	13	14	7	41

at Houchens Industries–L. T. Smith Stadium • Bowling Green, KY

- Date: Saturday August 23, 2025
- Game time: 6:00 PM CDT
- Game weather: Sunny, 84 °F (29 °C)
- Game attendance: 15,312
- Referee: Ron Hudson
- TV announcers (CBSSN): Chris Lewis (play-by-play), Robert Turbin (analyst), and Lauren Green (sideline reporter)

Game information

First quarter

- (8:31) WKU - Matthew Henry 26-yd pass from Maverick McIvor (John Cannon kick) (Drive: 9 plays, 87 yards, 2:31; Western Kentucky 7–0)
- (4:32) SHSU - RJ Lopez 40-yd field goal (Drive: 4 plays, 3 yards, 1:56; Western Kentucky 7–3)

Second quarter

- (12:24) SHSU - Hunter Watson 55-yd run (RJ Lopez kick) (Drive: 2 plays, 62 yards, 0:31; Sam Houston 10–7)
- (7:06) WKU - La'Vell Wright 1-yd run (John Cannon kick) (Drive: 13 plays, 75 yards, 5:18; Western Kentucky 14–10)
- (4:57) WKU - John Cannon 49-yd field goal (Drive: 4 plays, 4 yards, 0:56; Western Kentucky 17–10)
- (0:24) WKU - John Cannon 42-yd field goal (Drive: 11 plays, 38 yards, 2:26; Western Kentucky 20–10)

Third quarter

- (13:29) SHSU - Alton McCaskill 2-yd run (RJ Lopez kick) (Drive: 5 plays, 75 yards, 1:31; Western Kentucky 20–17)
- (11:58) SHSU - JaMair Diaz 43-yd fumble return (RJ Lopez kick) (Drive: 4 plays, 8 yards, 1:26; Sam Houston 24–20)
- (8:10) WKU - K.D. Hutchinson 9-yd pass from Maverick McIvor (John Cannon kick) (Drive: 9 plays, 87 yards, 3:41; Western Kentucky 27–24)
- (4:47) WKU - Marvis Parrish 22-yd pass from Maverick McIvor (John Cannon kick) (Drive: 4 plays, 87 yards, 1:20; Western Kentucky 34–24)

Fourth quarter

- (10:17) WKU - Maverick McIvor 4-yd run (John Cannon kick) (Drive: 6 plays, 81 yards, 2:17; Western Kentucky 41–24)

Statistics	SHSU	WKU
First downs	14	26
Plays–yards	61–382	86–506
Rushes–yards	31–173	35–105
Passing yards	209	401
Passing: Comp–Att–Int	19-30-1	33-51-0
Turnovers	1	2
Time of possession	27:04	32:56

Team	Category	Player	Statistics
Sam Houston	Passing	Hunter Watson	19/30, 209 yards, INT
Sam Houston	Rushing	Hunter Watson	14 carries, 91 yards, TD
Sam Houston	Receiving	Elijah Green	7 receptions, 61 yards
Western Kentucky	Passing	Maverick McIvor	33/51, 401 yards, 3 TD
Western Kentucky	Rushing	Marvis Parrish	12 carries, 52 yards
Western Kentucky	Receiving	Matthew Henry	7 receptions, 148 yards, TD

=== vs. North Alabama (FCS) ===
Game Two – North Alabama Lions (FCS) (0–0) at Western Kentucky Hilltoppers (1–0) – Game summary

Quarter	1	2	3	4	Total
Lions (FCS)	6	0	0	0	6
Hilltoppers	14	28	3	10	55

at Houchens Industries–L. T. Smith Stadium • Bowling Green, KY

- Date: Saturday August 30, 2025
- Game time: 6:00 PM CDT
- Game weather: Weather: Sunny • Temp: 78 °F (26 °C)
- Game attendance: 12,226
- Referee: Douglas Mercer
- TV announcers (ESPN+): Jesse Ough (play-by-play) and Terry Obee (analyst)

Game information

First Quarter

- (11:58) WKU – George Hart III 1-yard run (John Cannon kick) (Drive: 4 plays, 13 yards, 1:55; WKU 7–0)
- (5:58) UNA – Ian Vachon 25-yard field goal (Drive: 13 plays, 70 yards, 5:54; WKU 7–3)
- (5:58) UNA – Ian Vachon 47-yard field goal (Drive: 7 plays, 51 yards, 2:50; WKU 7–6)
- (11:58) WKU – Quincy Burroughs 9-yard pass from Maverick McIvor (John Cannon kick) (Drive: 5 plays, 75 yards, 2:00; WKU 14–6)

Second Quarter

- (8:24) WKU – Jairus Mack 20-yard pass from Maverick McIvor (John Cannon kick) (Drive: 8 plays, 72 yards, 3:01; WKU 21–6)
- (5:34) WKU – K.D. Hutchinson 78-yard pass from Maverick McIvor (John Cannon kick) (Drive: 1 play, 78 yards, 0:12; WKU 28–6)
- (2:25) WKU – K.D. Hutchinson 12-yard pass from Maverick McIvor (John Cannon kick) (Drive: 5 plays, 64 yards, 1:46; WKU 35–6)
- (0:48) WKU – Matthew Henry 14-yard pass from Maverick McIvor (John Cannon kick) (Drive: 5 plays, 25 yards, 0:59; WKU 42–6)

Third Quarter

- (0:48) WKU – John Cannon 46-yard field goal (Drive: 9 plays, 32 yards, 3:58; WKU 45–6)

Fourth Quarter

- (14:50) WKU – Marvin Sims 14-yard pass from Rodney Tisdale Jr (John Cannon kick) (Drive: 8 plays, 67 yards, 0:18; WKU 52–6)
- (6:30) WKU – John Cannon 43-yard field goal (Drive: 10 plays, 47 yards, 5:18; WKU 55–6)

Statistics	UNA	WKU
First downs	17	26
Plays–yards	74–258	72–563
Rushes–yards	37–153	33–164
Passing yards	105	399
Passing: Comp–Att–Int	16–37–0	30–39–0
Turnovers	1	0
Time of possession	32:21	27:39

Team	Category	Player	Statistics
North Alabama	Passing	Ari Patu	11/20, 86 yards
North Alabama	Rushing	Destin Wade	5 carries, 34 yards
North Alabama	Receiving	Justin Pegues	5 receptions, 52 yards
Western Kentucky	Passing	Maverick McIvor	24/31, 305 yards, 5 TD
Western Kentucky	Rushing	Jaden McGill	9 carries, 46 yards
Western Kentucky	Receiving	K.D. Hutchinson	5 receptions, 113 yards, 2 TD

=== at Toledo ===
Game Three – Western Kentucky Hilltoppers (2–0) at Toledo Rockets (0–1) – Game summary

Quarter	1	2	3	4	Total
Hilltoppers	7	0	0	14	21
Rockets	21	10	14	0	45

at Glass Bowl • Toledo, OH

- Date: Saturday September 6, 2025
- Game time: 6:00 PM CDT
- Game attendance: 24,138
- Referee: Jason Berg
- TV announcers (ESPN+): Michael Reghi (play-by-play) and Je'Rod Cherry (analyst)

Game information

First quarter

- TOL – Chip Trayanum 1-yard run (Dylan Cunanan kick), 12:57. Rockets 7–0. Drive: 3 plays, 34 yards, 1:27.
- TOL – Emmanuel McNeil-Warren 37-yard interception return (Dylan Cunanan kick), 11:52. Rockets 14–0.
- WKU – Matthew Henry 7-yard pass from Maverick McIvor (John Cannon kick), 6:48. Rockets 14–7. Drive: 7 plays, 56 yards, 2:32.
- TOL – Chip Trayanum 10-yard pas from Tucker Gleason (Dylan Cunanan kick), 2:34. Rockets 21–7. Drive: 9 plays, 75 yards, 4:14.[

Second quarter

- TOL – Dylan Cunanan 32-yard field goal, 11:50. Rockets 24–7. Drive: 11 plays, 57 yards, 4:51.
- TOL – Junior Vandeross III 71-yard pass from Tucker Gleason (Dylan Cunanan kick), 1:25. Rockets 31–7. Drive: 2 plays, 87 yards, 0:28.

Third quarter

- TOL – Chip Trayanum 75-yard run (Dylan Cunanan kick), 14:49. Rockets 38–7. Drive: 1 play, 75 yards, 0:11.
- TOL – Connor Jones 5-yard pass from John Alan Richter (Dylan Cunanan kick), 5:30. Rockets 45–7. Drive: 10 plays, 60 yards, 6:32.

Fourth quarter

- WKU – Jaden McGill 1-yard run (John Cannon kick), 13:08. Rockets 45–14. Drive: 6 plays, 52 yards, 2:27.
- WKU – Cameron Flowers II 11-yard pass from Maverick McIvor (John Cannon kick), 6:26. Rockets 45–21. Drive: 8 plays, 59 yards, 4:32.

Statistics	WKU	TOL
First downs	18	21
Plays–yards	67–333	63–508
Rushes–yards	28–59	42–307
Passing yards	274	201
Passing: Comp–Att–Int	24–39–1	12–21–1
Turnovers	2	1
Time of possession	26:35	33:25

Team	Category	Player	Statistics
Western Kentucky	Passing	Maverick McIvor	23/38, 235 yards, 2 TD, INT
Western Kentucky	Rushing	Marvis Parrish	7 carries, 22 yards
Western Kentucky	Receiving	Moussa Barry	3 receptions, 110 yards
Toledo	Passing	Tucker Gleason	7/12, 155 yards, 2 TD
Toledo	Rushing	Chip Trayanum	14 carries, 163 yards, 2 TD
Toledo	Receiving	Junior Vandeross III	5 receptions, 122 yards, TD

=== vs. Nevada ===
Game Four – Nevada Wolf Pack (1–2) at Western Kentucky Hilltoppers (2–1) – Game summary

Quarter	1	2	3	4	Total
Wolf Pack	3	7	3	3	16
Hilltoppers	3	0	7	21	31

at Houchens Industries–L. T. Smith Stadium • Bowling Green, KY

- Date: Saturday September 20, 2025
- Game time: 6:00 p.m. CDT
- Game weather: Sunny • Temperature: 69 °F (21 °C)
- Game attendance: 17,247
- Referee: Rodney Burnette
- TV announcers (ESPN+): Tyler Eaton (play-by-play) and Terry Obee (analyst)

Game information

First quarter

- (5:17) NEV - Joe McFadden 42-yard field goal Drive: 8 plays, 47 yards, 4:22; (Wolf Pack 3-0)
- (2:16) WKU - John Cannon 40-yard field goal Drive: 7 plays, 38 yards, 3:01; (TIED 3-3)

Second quarter

- (6:57) NEV - Chubba Purdy 6-yard run (Joe McFadden kick) Drive: 3 plays, 46 yards, 1:24; (Wolf Pack 10-3)

Third quarter

- (11:08) WKU - La'Vell Wright 2-yard run (John Cannon kick) Drive: 9 plays, 75 yards, 3:52; (TIED 10-10)
- (7:28) NEV - Joe McFadden 43-yard field goal Drive: 6 plays, 45 yards, 3:33; (Wolf Pack 13-10)

Fourth quarter

- (11:23) WKU - George Hart III 8-yard run (John Cannon kick) Drive: 9 plays, 85 yards, 4:02; (Hilltoppers 17-13)
- (1:49) WKU - La'Vell Wright 8-yard run (John Cannon kick) Drive: 14 plays, 87 yards, 5:34; (Hilltoppers 24-13)
- (0:29) NEV - Joe McFadden 22-yard field goal Drive: 12 plays, 69 yards, 1:20; (Hilltoppers 24-16)
- (0:23) WKU - Matthew Henry 48-yard kickoff return (John Cannon kick) (Hilltoppers 31-16)

Statistics	NEV	WKU
First downs	22	22
Plays–yards	72–372	66–361
Rushes–yards	39–207	33–145
Passing yards	165	216
Passing: Comp–Att–Int	16–33–2	22–33–1
Turnovers	3	2
Time of possession	32:16	27:44

Team	Category	Player	Statistics
Nevada	Passing	Chubba Purdy	16/30, 165 yards, 2 INT
Nevada	Rushing	Caleb Ramseur	9 carries, 66 yards
Nevada	Receiving	Jett Carpenter	6 receptions, 70 yards
Western Kentucky	Passing	Maverick McIvor	22/33, 216 yards, INT
Western Kentucky	Rushing	George Hart III	11 carries, 63 yards, TD
Western Kentucky	Receiving	Noah Meyers	6 receptions, 81 yards

=== at Missouri State ===
Game Five – Western Kentucky Hilltoppers (3–1) at Missouri State Bears (2–2) – Game summary

Quarter	1	2	3	4	Total
Hilltoppers	0	10	14	3	27
Bears	0	9	7	6	22

at Robert W. Plaster Stadium • Springfield, MO

- Date: Saturday September 27, 2025
- Game time: 6:00 p.m. CDT
- Game weather: Sunny • Temperature: 82 °F (28 °C) • Wind: W 4 mph
- Game attendance: 10,068
- Referee: Garrett Dickerson
- TV announcers (ESPN+): Don West (play-by-play), Tom Mast (analyst) and Cierra Clark (sideline)

Game information

First quarter

- No scoring plays

Second quarter

- (14:55) MOST - Yousef Obeid 49-yard field goal Drive: 6 plays, 49 yards, 2:06; (Bears 3-0)
- (13:56) WKU - Noah Meyers 39-yard pass from Maverick McIvor (John Cannon kick) Drive: 3 plays, 75 yards, 0:59; (Hilltoppers 7-3)
- (8:43) WKU - John Cannon 26-yard field goal Drive: 10 plays, 56 yards, 3:48; (Hilltoppers 10-3)
- (03:31) MOST - Yousef Obeid 22-yard field goal Drive: 11 plays, 70 yards, 5:12; (Hilltoppers 10-6)
- (0:59) MOST - Yousef Obeid 19-yard field goal Drive: 5 plays, 48 yards, 1:12; (Hilltoppers 10-9)

Third quarter

- (12:16) MOST - Shomari Lawrence 32-yard run (Yousef Obeid kick) Drive: 7 plays, 75 yards, 2:44; (Bears 16-10)
- (6:29) WKU - La'Vell Wright 2-yard run (John Cannon kick) Drive: 12 plays, 75 yards, 5:47; (Hilltoppers 17-16)
- (1:16) WKU - La'Vell Wright 17-yard run (John Cannon kick) Drive: 4 plays, 65 yards, 1:55; (Hilltoppers 24-16)

Fourth quarter

- (12:21) WKU - John Cannon 19-yard field goal Drive: 7 plays, 79 yards, 2:27; (Hilltoppers 27-16)
- (4:13) MOST - Tristian Gardner 9-yard pass from Deuce Bailey Drive: 9 plays, 52 yards, 4:30; (Hilltoppers 27-22)

Statistics	WKU	MOST
First downs	25	21
Plays–yards	68–476	66–414
Rushes–yards	29–159	34–214
Passing yards	317	200
Passing: Comp–Att–Int	26–39–0	15–32–0
Turnovers	0	0
Time of possession	31:28	28:32

Team	Category	Player	Statistics
Western Kentucky	Passing	Maverick McIvor	26/39, 317 yards, TD
Western Kentucky	Rushing	La'Vell Wright	10 carries, 91 yards, 2 TD
Western Kentucky	Receiving	Matthew Henry	5 receptions, 73 yards
Missouri State	Passing	Jacob Clark	8/15, 143 yards
Missouri State	Rushing	Shomari Lawrence	16 carries, 78 yards, TD
Missouri State	Receiving	Dash Luke	3 receptions, 71 yds

=== at Delaware ===
Game Six – Western Kentucky Hilltoppers (4–1) at Delaware Fightin' Blue Hens (3–1) – Game summary

Quarter	1	2	3	4	Total
Hilltoppers	0	10	17	0	27
Fightin' Blue Hens	7	10	0	7	24

at Delaware Stadium • Newark, DE

- Date: Friday October 3, 2025
- Game time: 6:00 p.m. CDT
- Game attendance: 19,179
- Referee: Ron Hudson
- TV announcers (CBSSN): John Sadak (play-by-play), Kyle Long (analyst) and Patrick Peterson (sideline)

Game information

First quarter

- (8:36) DEL – Nick Minicucci 2-yard run (Nate Reed kick). Fightin' Blue Hens 7–0. Drive: 15 plays, 75 yards, 6:24.

Second quarter

- (14:55) WKU – John Cannon 41-yard field goal. Fightin' Blue Hens 7–3. Drive: 8 plays, 55 yards, 3:36.
- (7:55) DEL – Nate Reed 23-yard field goal. Fightin' Blue Hens 10–3. Drive: 14 plays, 69 yards, 6:52.
- (1:55) WKU – K.D. Hutchinson 5-yard run (John Cannon kick). Tied 10–10. Drive: 13 plays, 75 yards, 6:00.
- (0:00) DEL – Nick Minicucci 1-yd run (Nate Reed kick). Fightin' Blue Hens 17–10. Drive: 7 plays, 61 yards, 1:47.

Third quarter

- (8:01) WKU – John Cannon 43-yard field goal. Fightin' Blue Hens 17–13. Drive: 8 plays, 31 yards, 2:57.
- (7:20) WKU – Koron Hayward 25-yard interception return (John Cannon kick). Hilltoppers 20–17.
- (0:38) WKU – George Hart III 5-yard pass from Maverick McIvor (John Cannon kick). Hilltoppers 27-17. Drive: 9 plays, 80 yards, 4:09.

Fourth quarter

- (9:54) DEL – Nick Minicucci 2-yard run (Nate Reed kick). Hilltoppers 27-24. Drive: 13 plays, 75 yards, 5:44.

Statistics	WKU	DEL
First downs	16	27
Plays–yards	57–338	80–435
Rushes–yards	26–108	34–121
Passing yards	230	314
Passing: Comp–Att–Int	23-31-0	28-46-1
Turnovers	1	2
Time of possession	27:26	32:34

Team	Category	Player	Statistics
Western Kentucky	Passing	Maverick McIvor	23/31, 230 yds, TD
Western Kentucky	Rushing	Maverick McIvor	6 carries, 36 yards
Western Kentucky	Receiving	Matthew Henry	4 receptions, 99 yards
Delaware	Passing	Nick Minicucci	28/45, 314 yds, INT
Delaware	Rushing	Nick Minicucci	12 carries, 55 yards, 3 TD
Delaware	Receiving	2 Tied	55 yards

=== vs. FIU ===
Game Seven – FIU Panthers (2–3) at Western Kentucky Hilltoppers (5–1) – Game summary

Quarter	1	2	3	4	Total
Panthers	6	13	6	0	25
Hilltoppers	3	3	0	0	6

at Houchens Industries–L. T. Smith Stadium • Bowling Green, KY

- Date: Tuesday October 14, 2025
- Game time: 7:00 p.m. CDT
- Game weather: Sunny • Temperature: 66 °F (19 °C)
- Game attendance: 12,276
- Referee: Douglas Mercer
- TV announcers (ESPNU): Chuckie Kempf (play-by-play) and Darius Walker (analyst)

Game information

First quarter

- (12:37) FIU – Noah Grant 37-yard field goal (Drive: 6 plays, 55 yards, 2:23; FIU 3–0)
- (7:37) FIU – Noah Grant 28-yard field goal (Drive: 5 plays, 87 yards, 2:04; FIU 6–0)
- (3:03) WKU – John Cannon 28-yard field goal (Drive: 9 plays, 55 yards, 4:34; FIU 6–3)

Second quarter

- (14:56) FIU – Noah Grant 37-yard field goal (Drive: 7 plays, 41 yards, 2:59; FIU 9–3)
- (7:57) FIU – Jackson Verdugo 8-yard pass from Keyone Jenkins, Noah Grant kick (Drive: 14 plays, 89 yards, 6:05; FIU 16–3)
- (2:57) FIU – Noah Grant 51-yard field goal (Drive: 5 plays, 5 yards, 3:15; FIU 19–3)
- (0:00) WKU – Jack Cassidy 55-yard field goal (Drive: 7 plays, 32 yards, 0:29; FIU 19–6)

Third quarter

- (2:03) FIU – Kejon Owens 6-yard run (Drive: 12 plays, 75 yards, 5:32; FIU 25–6)

Fourth quarter

No scoring plays

Statistics	FIU	WKU
First downs	21	18
Plays–yards	70–453	64–341
Rushes–yards	39–249	23–116
Passing yards	204	225
Passing: Comp–Att–Int	20–31–0	27–41–3
Turnovers	0	3
Time of possession	34:38	25:22

Team	Category	Player	Statistics
FIU	Passing	Keyone Jenkins	17/25, 184 yards, TD
FIU	Rushing	Kejon Owens	22 carries, 195 yards, TD
FIU	Receiving	Alex Perry	3 receptions, 86 yards
Western Kentucky	Passing	Maverick McIvor	20/31, 159 yards, 3 INT
Western Kentucky	Rushing	Mavis Parrish	9 carries, 74 yards
Western Kentucky	Receiving	Matthew Henry	2 receptions, 58 yards

=== at Louisiana Tech ===
Game Eight – Western Kentucky Hilltoppers (5–2) at Louisiana Tech Bulldogs (4–2) – Game summary

Quarter	1	2	3	4	OT	Total
Hilltoppers	10	10	0	0	8	28
Bulldogs	7	0	7	6	7	27

at Joe Aillet Stadium • Ruston, LA

- Date: Tuesday October 21, 2025
- Game time: 6:30 p.m. CDT
- Game weather: Sunny • Temperature: 69 °F (21 °C) • Wind: SW 6 mph
- Game attendance: 10,928
- Referee: Reed Brotherton
- TV announcers (CBSSN): Jack Gordon (play-by-play) and Taylor McHargue (analyst)

Game information

First quarter

- (10:26) WKU – John Cannon 47-yard field goal (Drive: 10 plays, 46 yards, 4:34; Western Kentucky 3–0)
- (6:46) LT – Tre Averhart 6-yard pass from Blake Baker, John Hoyet Chance kick (Drive: 9 plays, 75 yards, 3:40; Louisiana Tech 7–3)
- (1:09) WKU – La'Vell Wright 15-yard pass from Rodney Tisdale Jr., John Cannon kick (Drive: 11 plays, 75 yards, 5:37; Western Kentucky 10–7)

Second quarter

- (10:41) WKU – George Hart III 1-yard run, John Cannon kick (Drive: 6 plays, 56 yards, 2:02; Western Kentucky 17–7)
- (2:28) WKU – Jack Cassidy 53-yard field goal (Drive: 10 plays, 40 yards, 3:44; Western Kentucky 20–7)

Third quarter

- (14:45) LT – Devin Gandy 85-yard kickoff return, John Hoyet Chance kick (Western Kentucky 20–14)

Fourth quarter

- (14:49) LT – John Hoyet Chance 24-yard field goal (Drive: 13 plays, 59 yards, 4:36; Western Kentucky 20–17)
- (6:20) LT – John Hoyet Chance 24-yard field goal (Drive: 6 plays, 34 yards, 1:23; Tied 20–20)

Overtime

- LT – Andrew Burnette 2-yard run, John Hoyet Chance kick (Drive: 5 plays, 25 yards, 0:00; Louisiana Tech 27–20)
- WKU – George Hart III 4-yard run, Moussa Barry pass (Drive: 8 plays, 25 yards, 0:00; Western Kentucky 28–27)

Statistics	WKU	LT
First downs	21	24
Plays–yards	72–340	83–449
Rushes–yards	38–113	37–109
Passing yards	227	340
Passing: Comp–Att–Int	21–34–1	31–46–1
Turnovers	1	1
Time of possession	31:20	28:40

Team	Category	Player	Statistics
Western Kentucky	Passing	Rodney Tisdale Jr.	21/34, 227 yards, TD, INT
Western Kentucky	Rushing	Rodney Tisdale Jr.	12 carries, 73 yards
Western Kentucky	Receiving	K. D. Hutchinson	6 receptions, 77 yards
Louisiana Tech	Passing	Blake Baker	31/45, 340 yards, TD, INT
Louisiana Tech	Rushing	Blake Baker	10 carries, 49 yards
Louisiana Tech	Receiving	Marlion Jackson	6 receptions, 103 yards

=== vs. New Mexico State ===
Game Nine – New Mexico State Aggies (3–4) at Western Kentucky Hilltoppers (6–2) – Game summary

Quarter	1	2	3	4	Total
Aggies	3	3	3	7	16
Hilltoppers	0	14	14	7	35

at Houchens Industries–L. T. Smith Stadium • Bowling Green, KY

- Date: Saturday November 1, 2025
- Game time: 2:30 p.m. CDT
- Game attendance: 15,023
- Referee: Garrett Dickerson
- TV announcers (ESPN+): Tyler Eaton (play-by-play) and Terry Obee (analyst)

Game information

First quarter

- NMSU – Ryan Hawk 32-yard field goal, 1:00. Aggies 3–0. Drive: 7 plays, 38 yards, 2:12.

Second quarter

- NMSU – Ryan Hawk 27-yard field goal, 7:15. Aggies 6–0. Drive: 5 plays, 28 yards, 2:25.
- WKU – Matthew Henry 22-yard pass from Rodney Tisdale Jr. (John Cannon kick), 3:39. Hilltoppers 7–6. Drive: 8 plays, 75 yards, 3:36.
- WKU – Moussa Barry 21-yard pass from Rodney Tisdale Jr. (John Cannon kick), 1:14. Hilltoppers 14–6. Drive: 7 plays, 68 yards, 2:05.

Third quarter

- NMSU – Ryan Hawk 50-yard field goal, 9:49. Hilltoppers 14–9. Drive: 9 plays, 25 yards, 3:03.
- WKU – La'Vell Wright 5-yard run (John Cannon kick), 5:41. Hilltoppers 21–9. Drive: 4 plays, 44 yards, 1:52.
- WKU – Matthew Henry 11-yard pass from Rodney Tisdale Jr. (John Cannon kick), 2:40. Hilltoppers 28–9. Drive: 6 plays, 59 yards, 2:27.

Fourth quarter

- WKU – Jackson West 6-yard pass from Rodney Tisdale Jr. (John Cannon kick), 11:12. Hilltoppers 35–9. Drive: 11 plays, 59 yards, 5:30.
- NMSU – Stilton McKelvey 71-yard fumble return (Ryan Hawk kick), 1:25. Hilltoppers 35–16.

Statistics	NMSU	WKU
First downs	14	24
Plays–yards	66–178	79–429
Rushes–yards	26–66	38–128
Passing yards	112	301
Passing: Comp–Att–Int	13–40–1	30–41–1
Turnovers	1	2
Time of possession	26:14	33:46

Team	Category	Player	Statistics
New Mexico State	Passing	Logan Fife	13/39, 112 yards, INT
New Mexico State	Rushing	Isaiah Rudison	7 carries, 34 yards
New Mexico State	Receiving	Gavin Harris	3 receptions, 29 yards
Western Kentucky	Passing	Rodney Tisdale Jr.	30/38, 301 yards, 4 TD, INT
Western Kentucky	Rushing	La'Vell Wright	6 carries, 44 yards, TD
Western Kentucky	Receiving	K.D. Hutchinson	7 receptions, 83 yards

=== vs. Middle Tennessee (100 Miles of Hate) ===
Game Ten – Middle Tennessee Blue Raiders (1–8) at Western Kentucky Hilltoppers (7–2) – Game summary

Quarter	1	2	3	4	Total
Blue Raiders	0	10	13	3	26
Hilltoppers	7	14	7	14	42

at Houchens Industries–L. T. Smith Stadium • Bowling Green, KY

- Date: Saturday November 15, 2025
- Game time: 2:30 p.m. CST
- Game attendance: 16,547
- Referee: Ron Hudson
- TV announcers (ESPN+): Tyler Eaton (play-by-play) and Terry Obee (analyst)

Game information

First quarter

- WKU – La'Vell Wright 3-yard run (John Cannon kick), 8:29. Hilltoppers 7–0. Drive: 16 plays, 87 yards, 6:27.

Second quarter

- WKU – Matthew Henry 22-yard pass from Rodney Tisdale Jr. (John Cannon kick), 13:40. Hilltoppers 14–0. Drive: 4 plays, 49 yards, 1:42.
- MTSU – AJ Jones 3-yard from Roman Gagliano (Jacob Hathaway kick), 11:04. Hilltoppers 14–7. Drive: 5 plays, 75 yards, 2:36.
- MTSU – Jacob Hathaway 25-yard field goal, 6:11. Hilltoppers 14–10. Drive: 8 plays, 73 yards, 2:05.
- WKU – Noah Meyers 3-yard pass from Rodney Tisdale Jr. (John Cannon kick), 2:38. Hilltoppers 21–10. Drive: 9 plays, 79 yards, 3:28.

Third quarter

- MTSU – Myles Butler 52-yard pass from Roman Gagliano (pass failed), 14:09. Hilltoppers 21–16. Drive: 2 plays, 75 yards, 0:51.
- WKU – Rodney Tisdale Jr. 8-yard run (John Cannon kick), 11:59. Hilltoppers 28–16. Drive: 6 plays, 75 yards, 2:10.
- MTSU – DJ Taylor 34-yard run (Jacob Hathaway kick), 6:50. Hilltoppers 28–23. Drive: 9 plays, 75 yards, 5:09.

Fourth quarter

- MTSU – Jacob Hathaway 23-yard field goal, 10:46. Hilltoppers 28–26. Drive: 6 plays, 28 yards, 2:49.
- WKU – Noah Meyers 1-yard pass from Rodney Tisdale Jr. (John Cannon kick), 5:45. Hilltoppers 35–26. Drive: 10 plays, 75 yards, 5:01.
- WKU – La'Vell Wright 37-yard run (John Cannon kick), 1:50. Hilltoppers 42–26. Drive: 6 plays, 80 yards, 2:43.

Statistics	MTSU	WKU
First downs	20	29
Plays–yards	67–541	79–642
Rushes–yards	25–152	38–271
Passing yards	389	371
Passing: Comp–Att–Int	25–42–0	29–41–1
Turnovers	0	1
Time of possession	26:12	33:48

Team	Category	Player	Statistics
Middle Tennessee	Passing	Roman Gagliano	25/42, 389 yards, 2 TD
Middle Tennessee	Rushing	Roman Gagliano	14 carries, 82 yards
Middle Tennessee	Receiving	Myles Butler	7 receptions, 105 yards, TD
Western Kentucky	Passing	Rodney Tisdale Jr.	29/41, 371 yards, 3 TD, INT
Western Kentucky	Rushing	Marvis Parrish	12 carries, 102 yards
Western Kentucky	Receiving	Matthew Henry	7 receptions, 135 yards, TD

=== at LSU ===
Game Eleven – Western Kentucky Hilltoppers (8–2) at LSU Tigers (6–4) – Game summary

Quarter	1	2	3	4	Total
Hilltoppers	3	0	0	7	10
Tigers	0	7	3	3	13

at Tiger Stadium • Baton Rouge, LA

- Date: Saturday November 22, 2025
- Game time: 6:45 p.m. CST
- Game attendance: 100,923
- Referee: Steve Marlowe
- TV announcers (SECN): Tom Hart (play-by-play), Jordan Rodgers (analyst) and Cole Cubelic (sideline)

Game information

First quarter

- (11:43) WKU - John Cannon 36-yard field goal (Drive: 9 plays, 57 yards, 3:17; Western Kentucky 3-0)

Second quarter

- (1:32) LSU - Trey'Dez Green 11-yard pass from Michael Van Buren Jr. (Damian Ramos kick) (Drive: 8 plays, 62 yards, 1:43; LSU 7-3)

Third quarter

- (5:55) LSU - Damian Ramos 18-yard field goal (Drive: 6 plays, 21 yards, 2:30; LSU 10-3)

Fourth quarter

- (11:15) LSU - Damian Ramos 29-yard field goal (Drive: 10 plays, 40 yards, 4:55; LSU 13-3)
- (1:05) WKU - Dylan Flowers 71-yard fumble return (John Cannon kick) (Drive: 3 plays, 8 yards, 1:25; LSU 13-10)

Statistics	WKU	LSU
First downs	14	20
Plays–yards	75-152	81-328
Rushes–yards	24-22	37-126
Passing yards	130	202
Passing: comp–att–int	21-41-2	25-42-1
Turnovers	2	2
Time of possession	24:06	35:54

Team	Category	Player	Statistics
Western Kentucky	Passing	Rodney Tisdale Jr.	20/39, 128 yards, 2 INT
Western Kentucky	Rushing	Marvis Parrish	7 carries, 32 yards
Western Kentucky	Receiving	K. D. Hutchinson	8 receptions, 40 yards
LSU	Passing	Michael Van Buren Jr.	25/42, 202 yards, TD, INT
LSU	Rushing	Harlem Berry	18 carries, 80 yards
LSU	Receiving	Zavion Thomas	6 receptions, 47 yards

=== at Jacksonville State ===
Game Twelve – Western Kentucky Hilltoppers (8–3) at Jacksonville State Gamecocks (7–4) – Game summary

Quarter	1	2	3	4	Total
Hilltoppers	14	14	3	3	34
Gamecocks	7	17	7	6	37

at AmFirst Stadium • Jacksonville, AL

- Date: Saturday November 29, 2025
- Game time: 1:00 p.m. CST
- Game attendance: 16,733
- Referee: Garrett Dickerson
- TV announcers (ESPN+): Eli Gold (play-by-play), Jeff Burger (analyst) and Taylor Korn (sideline)

Game information

First quarter

- JVST – Cam Cook 14-yard run (Garrison Rippa kick), 12:13. Gamecocks 7–0. Drive: 7 plays, 75 yards, 2:47.
- WKU – Rodney Tisdale Jr. 1-yard run (John Cannon kick), 8:28. Tied 7–7. Drive: 7 plays, 66 yards, 3:45.
- WKU – La'Vell Wright 1-yard run (John Cannon kick), 6:15. Hilltoppers 14–7. Drive: 4 plays, 46 yards, 1:40.

Second quarter

- WKU – K.D. Hutchinson 13-yard run (John Cannon kick), 14:53. Hilltoppers 21–7. Drive: 11 plays, 65 yards, 4:11.
- JVST – Garrison Rippa 27-yard field goal, 9:33. Hilltoppers 21–10. Drive: 10 plays, 65 yards, 5:20.
- JVST – Pearson Baldwin 2-yard pass from Caden Creel (Garrison Rippa kick), 6:18. Hilltoppers 21–17. Drive: 4 plays, 10 yards, 1:47.
- WKU – La'Vell Wright 39-yard run (John Cannon kick), 1:52. Hilltoppers 28–17. Drive: 9 plays, 90 yards, 4:17.
- JVST – Deondre Johnson 22-yard pass from Caden Creel (Garrison Rippa kick), 0:15. Hilltoppers 28–24. Drive: 6 plays, 75 yards, 1:37.

Third quarter

- JVST – Caden Creel 70-yard run (Garrison Rippa kick), 11:22. Gamecocks 31–28. DrivE: 3 plays, 76 yards, 1:22.
- WKU – John Cannon 42-yard field goal, 7:16. Tied 31–31. Drive: 8 plays, 51 yards, 4:06.

Fourth quarter

- JVST – Garrison Rippa 27-yard field goal, 12:28. Gamecocks 34–31. Drive: 11 plays, 66 yards, 4:00.
- WKU – Jack Cassidy 41-yard field goal, 8:19. Tied 34–34. Drive: 4 plays, 2 yards, 1:53.
- JVST – Garrison Rippa 28-yard field goal, 0:00. Gamecocks 37–34. Drive: 11 plays, 50 yards, 4:18.

Statistics	WKU	JVST
First downs	21	24
Plays–yards	61–384	68–515
Rushes–yards	36–204	48–293
Passing yards	180	222
Passing: Comp–Att–Int	17–25–1	13–20–0
Turnovers	2	1
Time of possession	28:36	31:24

Team	Category	Player	Statistics
Western Kentucky	Passing	Rodney Tisdale Jr.	17/24, 180 yards, INT
Western Kentucky	Rushing	La'Vell Wright	14 carries, 116 yards, 2 TD
Western Kentucky	Receiving	Moussa Barry	3 receptions, 68 yards
Jacksonville State	Passing	Caden Creel	12/19, 204 yards, 2 TD
Jacksonville State	Rushing	Caden Creel	20 carries, 143 yards, TD
Jacksonville State	Receiving	Deondre Johnson	5 receptions, 122 yards, TD

=== vs. Southern Miss (New Orleans Bowl) ===
Game Thirteen – 2025 New Orleans Bowl
Western Kentucky Hilltoppers (8–4) vs. Southern Miss Golden Eagles (7–5) – Game summary

Quarter	1	2	3	4	Total
Hilltoppers	3	3	7	14	27
Golden Eagles	7	6	3	0	16

at Caesars Superdome • New Orleans, LA

- Date: December 23
- Game time: 4:30 p.m. CST
- Game weather: None (played indoors)
- Game attendance: 16,693
- Referee: Christian Watson
- TV announcers (ESPN): Courtney Lyle (play-by-play), Rene Ingoglia (analyst) and Ian Fitzsimmons (sideline)

Game information

First quarter

- (11:38) WKU – John Cannon 31-yard field goal (Drive: 4 plays, -1 yards, 1:16; Western Kentucky 3–0)
- (4:06) USM – Tychaun Chapman 35-yard pass from Braylon Braxton, Creighton Wilbanks kick (Drive: 4 plays, 62 yards, 1:22; Southern Miss 7–3)

Second quarter

- (11:09) WKU – John Cannon 30-yard field goal (Drive: 8 plays, 31 yards, 3:08; Southern Miss 7–6)
- (3:10) USM – Creighton Wilbanks 25-yard field goal (Drive: 7 plays, 16 yards, 2:11; Southern Miss 10–6)
- (0:00) USM – Creighton Wilbanks 29-yard field goal (Drive: 10 plays, 57 yards, 1:10; Southern Miss 13–6)

Third quarter

- (6:57) WKU – Maverick McIvor 11-yard run, John Cannon kick (Drive: 8 plays, 65 yards, 4:24; Tied 13–13)
- (1:36) SMU – Creighton Wilbanks 41-yard field goal (Drive: 9 plays, 44 yards, 3:15; Southern Miss 16–13)

Fourth quarter

- (7:51) WKU – George Hart III 1-yard run, John Cannon kick (Drive: 11 plays, 65 yards, 5:12; Western Kentucky 20–16)
- (3:38) WKU – Marvis Parrish 54-yard run, John Cannon kick (Drive: 7 plays, 83 yards, 2:39; Western Kentucky 27–16)

Statistics	WKU	USM
First downs	18	21
Plays–yards	73–422	84–377
Rushes–yards	33–155	36–119
Passing yards	267	258
Passing: Comp–Att–Int	22–40–2	24–48–1
Turnovers	3	1
Time of possession	31:24	28:36

Team	Category	Player	Statistics
Western Kentucky	Passing	Maverick McIvor	12/19, 199 yards, INT
Western Kentucky	Rushing	Marvis Parrish	7 carries, 65 yards, TD
Western Kentucky	Receiving	Matthew Henry	7 receptions, 126 yards
Southern Miss	Passing	Braylon Braxton	24/47, 258 yards, TD, INT
Southern Miss	Rushing	Jeffery Pittman	10 carries, 55 yards
Southern Miss	Receiving	Tychaun Chapman	3 receptions, 50 yards, TD

== Roster ==
2025 Western Kentucky Hilltoppers football team roster
Players
Coaches
Offense

Pos.	#	Name	Class
WR	0	Matthew Henry	Sr
WR	2	K.D. Hutchinson	Jr
WR	3	Moussa Barry	Jr
WR	4	Cameron Flowers	Fr
WR	5	Jairus Mack	Sr
QB	7	Maverick McIvor	GS
RB	9	George Hart III	Sr
QB	10	Caleb McMickle	So
QB	11	Tucker Parks	Fr
RB	11	La'Vell Wright	GS
WR	12	Quincy Burroughs	Jr
WR	12	Damari Jefferson	Fr
WR	13	Kelby Williams	Sr
QB	14	Owen Loy	Fr
TE	15	Justin Wolf	Sr
QB	16	Rodney Tisdale Jr.	Fr
WR	18	Marvin Sims	Jr
TE	19	Lofton Howard	So
RB	21	Marvis Parrish	Fr
WR	22	Justin Brown	So
RB	23	Jalen Hampton	Sr
WR	24	Fonzy Smith	Fr
RB	25	Jaden McGill	Sr
RB	26	Donovan Jones	Fr
RB	27	Corey Landers	So
RB	28	Javon McMahan	Fr
RB	29	Adrion Boyd	Jr
OL	50	Laurence Seymore	Sr
OL	52	Isiah Stoudemire	Fr
OL	53	Marshall Jackson	Sr
OL	55	Elijah Williams	Fr
OL	63	Quincy Jenkins	Sr
OL	64	Jackson Dialls	Fr
OL	65	Devon Smith	Sr
OL	68	Gabe Claybrook	Fr
OL	70	Jemeil Jackson	Sr
OL	74	Karsten Upchurch	Jr
OL	76	Max Thurston	So
OL	77	Melvin Collins Jr.	Jr
WR	80	Isaiah Myers	Jr
TE	81	Noah Meyers	So
WR	82	Jaleel Walker	Sr
TE	85	Jackson West	Sr
TE	88	Aiden Miller	So
TE	89	Cross Nimmo	Fr

Defense

Pos.	#	Name	Class
DL	0	Mackavelli Malotumau	Sr
LB	3	Anthony Brackenridge	Sr
DB	5	Jalen Emery	Sr
DB	6	Nazir Ward	So
DB	7	Jaylen Lewis	Jr
LB	8	Miller Malone	So
LB	9	Dominic Oliver	Sr
DB	10	Dylan Flowers	Sr
DB	11	Kent Robinson	Jr
DB	12	Jaavan Mack	Sr
DL	13	Robby Harrison	Jr
DB	14	Braxton Myers	So
DL	15	Jayden Gray	Sr
DB	16	Avarion Cole	Sr
DB	17	Dave Herard	Sr
LB	20	Zach Smith	Fr
LB	21	Jaylen Wester	Sr
LB	22	Jordan Donald	Fr
DB	23	Korbyn Green	Jr
DB	24	Lataj Wright	Sr
DB	25	Xavion "Tutu" Griffin	Fr
DB	26	Jai Eugene Jr.	So
DB	27	Jordan Bergeron	Fr
LB	29	Joshua Mensah	Jr
DB	31	Jalen Jackson	Fr
LB	33	Eli Jones	Jr
LB	34	Koron Hayward	So
LB	35	Elijah Rumph	Fr
DB	36	Khrystian Washington	So
LB	38	Kennon Loftin	Jr
LB	41	Brandon Thomas	Fr
DE	44	Harper Holloman	So
LB	45	Josaiah Knight	Fr
LB	48	Zsacari Minnis	Fr
DL	50	Elin Jones	Sr
DL	52	Jakeem Fletcher	Jr
DL	54	Sekou Peters	Fr
DL	55	Venson Sneed	Jr
DL	59	Sharlandiin "Zaaq" Strange	Fr
DL	91	Kai Micatrotto	Fr
DL	93	Rylen Su'a-Filo	Sr
DL	96	Brandon Tobias II	Fr
DL	98	Jaden Hardy	Sr
DL	99	Eric Etienne	So

Special teams

Pos.	#	Name	Class
P	18	Cole Maynard	Sr
K	39	John Cannon	Sr
K	42	Jack Cassidy	Jr
K	43	Jackson Smith	Jr
LS	44	Bailey Sanders	Fr
K	49	Konner Olson	GS
LS	55	Rex Robich	Sr
K	58	Michael Buck	Fr

Head coach

- Tyson Helton

Coordinators/assistant coaches

- Andy LaRussa (assistant head coach / special teams coordinator)
- Rick Bowie (offensive coordinator / quarterbacks)
- Da'Von Brown (co-defensive coordinator / defensive backs)
- Davis Merritt (co-defensive coordinator / inside linebackers)
- Jimmy Lindsey (run game coordinator / edges / defensive line)
- Bryan Applewhite (running backs)
- Jason Barnes (wide receivers)
- Joe Bernardi (Offensive line)
- Kali James (defensive tackle)
- Jason Martin (cornerbacks)
- Kevin O'Brien (tight ends)
- Trevor Borland (quality control – tight ends)
- Terrion Thompson (quality control – defensive line)
- Devon Lynch (quality control – football strength & conditioning)

Legend

- (C) Team captain
- (S) Suspended
- (I) Ineligible
- Injured
- Redshirt

Roster
Last update: January 2, 2026
