= Mason McKenzie =

American football player

No. 10 – Boston College Eagles
- Position: Quarterback
- Class: Redshirt Junior

Personal information
- Born: 2004 (age 21–22); Michigan, U.S.
- Listed height: 6 ft 1 in (1.85 m)
- Listed weight: 200 lb (91 kg)

Career information
- High school: Caledonia (Caledonia, Michigan)
- College: Saginaw Valley State (2023–2025); Boston College (2026–present)

Awards and highlights
- GLIAC Player of the Year (2025); GLIAC Freshman of the Year (2024)
- Stats at ESPN

Mason McKenzie (born 2004) is an American football quarterback for the Boston College Eagles. He previously played for the Saginaw Valley State Cardinals.

== Early life ==
McKenzie attended Caledonia High School in Caledonia, Michigan, and committed to play college football for the Saginaw Valley State Cardinals.

== College career ==
As a freshman in 2023, McKenzie was redshirted. As the team's starting quarterback in 2024, he completed 147 of his 267 pass attempts for 2,054 yards and 14 touchdowns, while also rushing 117 times for 662 yards and six touchdowns, earning GLIAC Freshman of the year honors. In the 2025 season opener, McKenzie completed 14 of 21 pass attempts for 243 yards and two touchdowns, while also adding 101 yards and a touchdown on 12 carries, in a loss to Northeastern State. He finished the 2025 season, completing 59.8% of his passes for 2,086 yards and 17 touchdowns, while adding 942 yards and ten touchdowns on the ground, earning GLIAC Player of the Year honors. After the season, McKenzie entered the NCAA transfer portal.

McKenzie transferred to play for the Boston College Eagles. At the ACC Media Days, head coach Bill O’Brien announced McKenzie would be the starting quarterback.
