= Caledonia High School (Michigan) =

Public school in Michigan, US

Location
- 9050 Kraft Avenue; Caledonia, Kent County, Michigan 49316; United States
- 42°47′57″N 85°31′26″W

Information
- School type: Public, high school
- Status: Open
- School district: Caledonia Community Schools
- NCES District ID: 2607620
- CEEB code: 230455
- NCES School ID: 260762004346
- Dean: Derek Pennington
- Principal: William Martin
- Teaching staff: 79.55 (on a FTE basis)
- Grades: 9–12
- Enrollment: 1,438 (2024-2025)
  - Grade 9: 374
  - Grade 10: 342
  - Grade 11: 313
  - Grade 12: 409
- Student to teacher ratio: 18.08
- Colors: Purple and gold
- Athletics conference: Ottawa-Kent Conference
- Nickname: Fighting Scots
- National ranking: 3,594
- Website: www.calschools.org/cal-hs/

Student assessments
- 2022–23 school year Change vs. prior year

M-STEP 11th grade proficiency rates (Science / Social Studies)
- Advanced %: 19.5 / 12.7
- Proficient %: 31.3 / 29.8
- PR. Proficient %: 16.5 / 44.8
- Not Proficient %: 32.7 / 12.7

Average test scores
- SAT Total: 1017.2 (▼ −14.3)

Caledonia High School is a Public, high school located in Caledonia, Michigan. It serves grades 9–12 in the Caledonia Community Schools.

== History ==
The North Campus building opened in 2004. The South Campus building opened in 2017.

== Demographics ==
In 2023-2024, 1,427 children enrolled in Caledonia High School. Of these, 342 were ninth-graders (23.3%), 400 were tenth-graders (27.3%), 351 were eleventh-graders (24.0%), and 371 were twelfth-graders (25.3%). As of 2022-2023, only around 16.4% of students belonged to racial minority groups. 82.34% of students identified as White, 6.8% Hispanic, 6.1% two or more races, 2.87% Asian, 1.61% Black, 0.14% Native American, and 0.14% Pacific Islander. The gender distribution was roughly equal, with 49% of students being female and 51% being male.

18.29% of students were identified as economically disadvantaged. 9.88% of students identified as disabled.

Around 39% of students took one or more AP exam.

== Athletics ==
The Caledonia Fighting Scots are members of the Ottawa-Kent Conference. The school colors are purple and gold. The following MHSAA sanctioned sports are offered:

- Baseball (boys)
- Basketball (girls and boys)
- Bowling (girls and boys)
- Competitive cheer (girls)
- Cross country (girls and boys)
- Football (boys)
- Golf (girls and boys)
- Ice hockey (boys)
- Lacrosse (girls and boys)
- Skiing (girls and boys)
- Soccer (girls and boys)
- Softball (girls)
- Swim and dive (girls and boys)
- Tennis (girls and boys)
- Track and field (girls and boys)
- Volleyball (girls and boys)
- Wrestling (boys)

== Notable alumni ==
- Mason McKenzie, college football quarterback for the Boston College Eagles
