= Caledonia, Michigan =

- Village
- Village of Caledonia
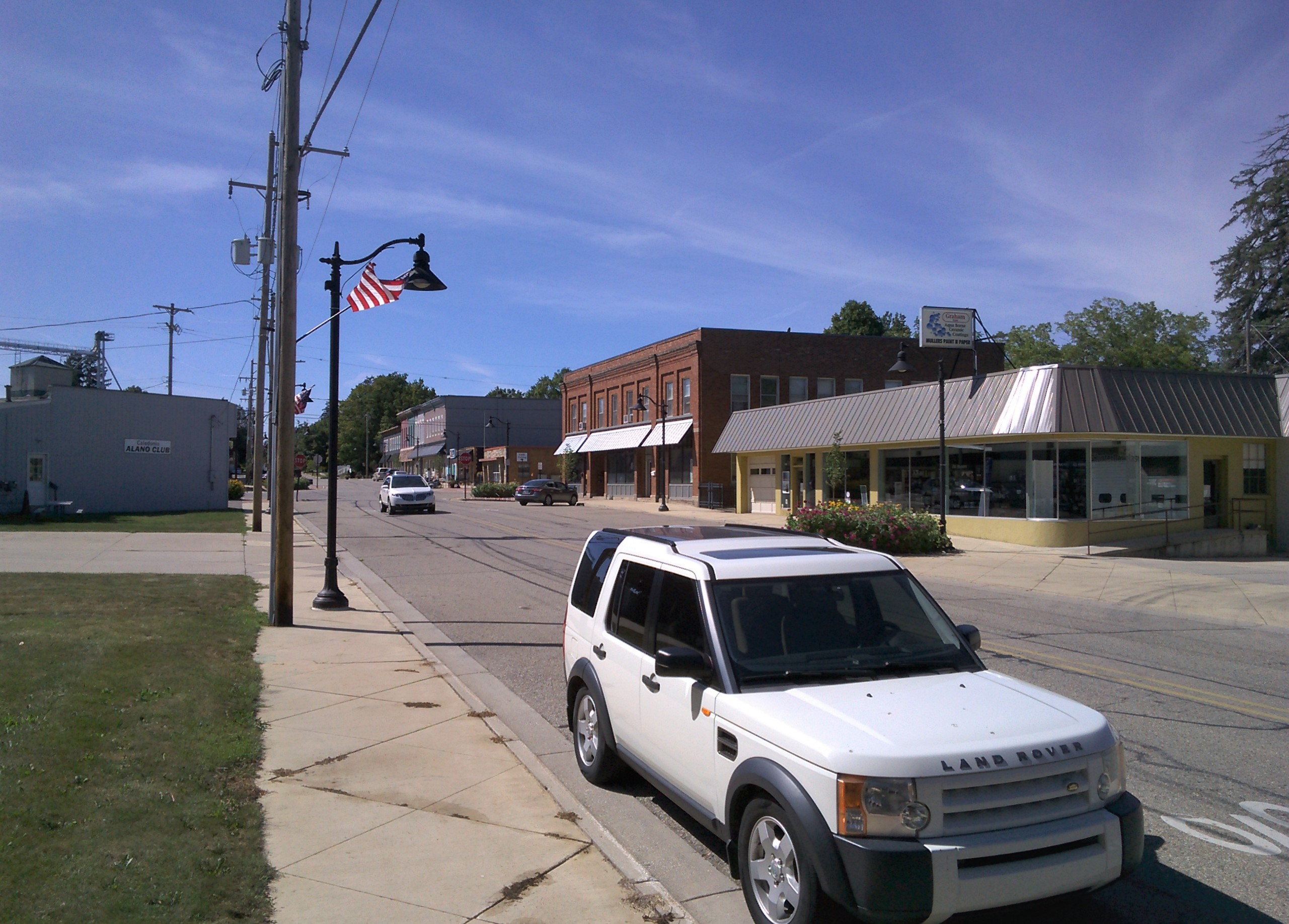
- Looking west along Main Street

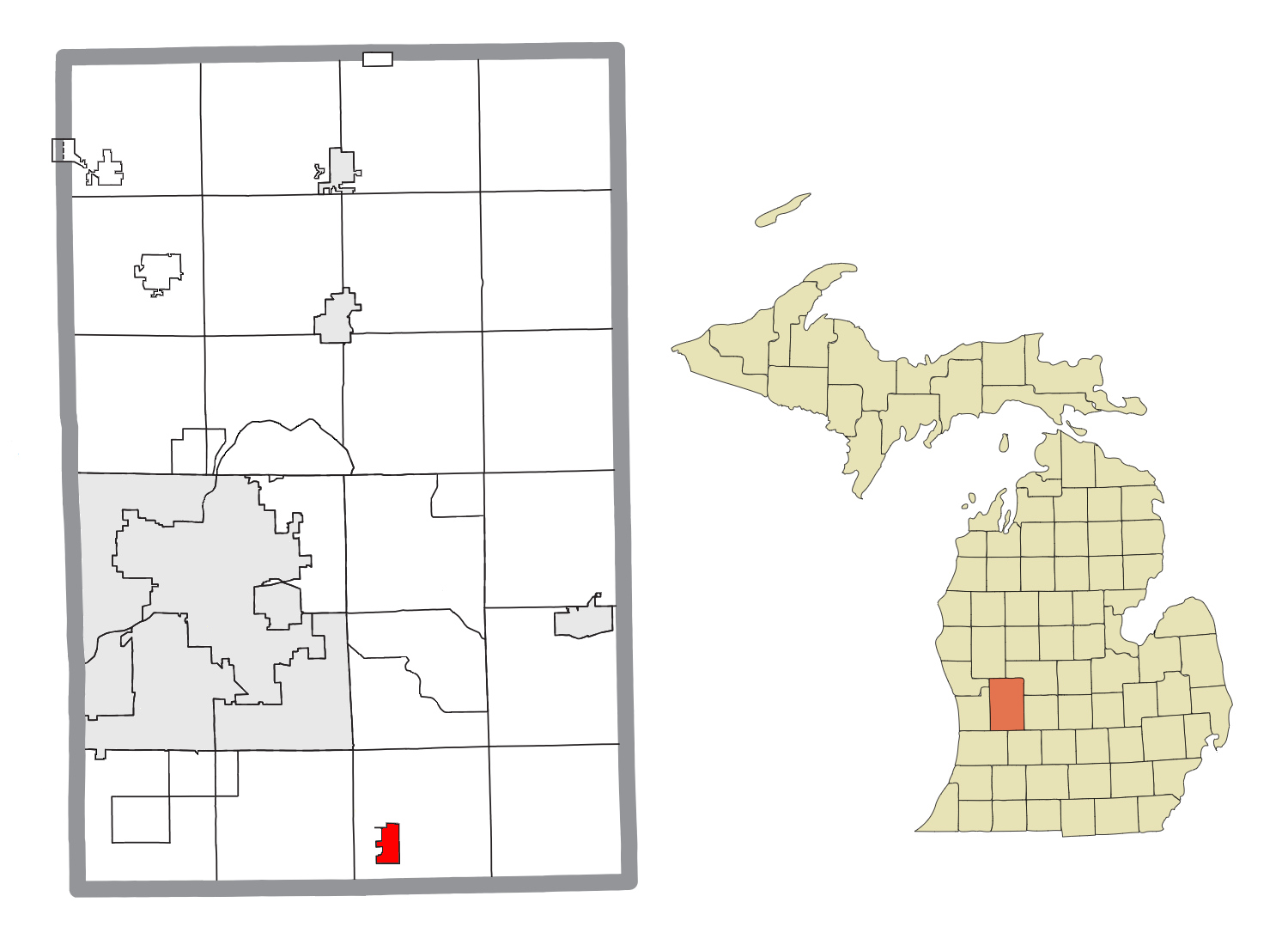
- Location within Kent County

- Location within the state of Michigan Location within the United States
- Coordinates: 42°47′23″N 85°30′50″W
- Country: United States
- State: Michigan
- County: Kent
- Township: Caledonia
- Settled: 1838
- Incorporated: 1888

Government
  - Type: Village council
  - President: Jennifer Lindsey
  - Clerk: Brian Bennett

Area
  - Total: 1.42 sq mi (3.68 km^{2})
  - Land: 1.34 sq mi (3.47 km^{2})
  - Water: 0.081 sq mi (0.21 km^{2})
- Elevation: 810 ft (247 m)

Population (2020)
  - Total: 1,622
  - Density: 1,209/sq mi (466.9/km^{2})
- Time zone: UTC-5 (Eastern (EST))
  - Summer (DST): UTC-4 (EDT)
- ZIP code(s): 49316
- Area code: 616
- FIPS code: 26-12480
- GNIS feature ID: 0622452
- Website: Official website

Caledonia is a village in Kent County in the U.S. state of Michigan. The population was 1,622 at the 2020 census. The village is located within Caledonia Township about 15 miles (24.1 km) southeast of downtown Grand Rapids.

== History ==
Caledonia was incorporated as a village in 1888.

== Geography ==
According to the U.S. Census Bureau, the village has a total area of 1.42 square miles (3.68 km^{2}), of which 1.34 square miles (3.47 km^{2}) is land and 0.08 square miles (0.21 km^{2}) (5.63%) is water.

=== Major highways ===
- M-37 (Cherry Valley Avenue) forms the eastern boundary of the village.

=== Climate ===
This climatic region is typified by large seasonal temperature differences, with warm to hot (and often humid) summers and cold (sometimes severely cold) winters. According to the Köppen Climate Classification system, Caledonia has a humid continental climate, abbreviated "Dfb" on climate maps.

== Education ==
The village of Caledonia is served by Caledonia Community Schools, which also serves a larger area that includes portions of several townships and a small portion of the city of Kentwood. The district contains nine schools, of which three of them—Emmons Lake Elementary School, Kraft Meadows Intermediate School, and Duncan Lake Middle School—are located within the village. There are also five other schools: Caledonia High School, Kettle Lake Elementary School, Paris Ridge Elementary School, Caledonia Elementary School, and Dutton Lake Elementary School.

The Caledonia Township Branch of the Kent District Library is located within the village.

== Demographics ==
Historical population
| Census | Pop. | Note | %± |
|---|---|---|---|
| 1880 | 340 | | — |
| 1890 | 438 | | 28.8% |
| 1900 | 427 | | −2.5% |
| 1910 | 422 | | −1.2% |
| 1920 | 432 | | 2.4% |
| 1930 | 469 | | 8.6% |
| 1940 | 467 | | −0.4% |
| 1950 | 619 | | 32.5% |
| 1960 | 739 | | 19.4% |
| 1970 | 716 | | −3.1% |
| 1980 | 722 | | 0.8% |
| 1990 | 885 | | 22.6% |
| 2000 | 1,102 | | 24.5% |
| 2010 | 1,511 | | 37.1% |
| 2020 | 1,622 | | 7.3% |
U.S. Decennial Census

=== 2020 census ===
As of the 2020 census, Caledonia had a population of 1,622. The median age was 34.9 years. 29.8% of residents were under the age of 18 and 8.9% of residents were 65 years of age or older. For every 100 females there were 99.3 males, and for every 100 females age 18 and over there were 98.4 males age 18 and over.

100.0% of residents lived in urban areas, while 0.0% lived in rural areas.

There were 595 households in Caledonia, of which 43.5% had children under the age of 18 living in them. Of all households, 53.8% were married-couple households, 19.5% were households with a male householder and no spouse or partner present, and 22.7% were households with a female householder and no spouse or partner present. About 22.2% of all households were made up of individuals and 5.6% had someone living alone who was 65 years of age or older.

There were 640 housing units, of which 7.0% were vacant. The homeowner vacancy rate was 1.1% and the rental vacancy rate was 6.0%.

Racial composition as of the 2020 census
| Race | Number | Percent |
|---|---|---|
| White | 1,481 | 91.3% |
| Black or African American | 25 | 1.5% |
| American Indian and Alaska Native | 3 | 0.2% |
| Asian | 17 | 1.0% |
| Native Hawaiian and Other Pacific Islander | 0 | 0.0% |
| Some other race | 9 | 0.6% |
| Two or more races | 87 | 5.4% |
| Hispanic or Latino (of any race) | 58 | 3.6% |

=== 2010 census ===
As of the census of 2010, there were 1,511 people, 529 households, and 392 families residing in the village. The population density was 1,136.1 inhabitants per square mile (438.7/km^{2}). There were 549 housing units at an average density of 412.8 per square mile (159.4/km^{2}). The racial makeup of the village was 96.8% White, 0.7% African American, 0.1% Native American, 0.7% Asian, 0.6% from other races, and 1.0% from two or more races. Hispanic or Latino of any race were 2.7% of the population.

There were 529 households, of which 50.9% had children under the age of 18 living with them, 54.4% were married couples living together, 14.2% had a female householder with no husband present, 5.5% had a male householder with no wife present, and 25.9% were non-families. 21.7% of all households were made up of individuals, and 5.3% had someone living alone who was 65 years of age or older. The average household size was 2.86 and the average family size was 3.36.

The median age in the village was 30.7 years. 34.9% of residents were under the age of 18; 8.2% were between the ages of 18 and 24; 29.6% were from 25 to 44; 21.4% were from 45 to 64; and 5.8% were 65 years of age or older. The gender makeup of the village was 49.5% male and 50.5% female.

=== 2000 census ===
As of the census of 2000, there were 1,102 people, 430 households, and 304 families residing in the village. The population density was 816.3 inhabitants per square mile (315.2/km^{2}). There were 449 housing units at an average density of 332.6 per square mile (128.4/km^{2}). The racial makeup of the village was 97.91% White, 0.27% African American, 0.09% Native American, 0.54% Asian, 0.09% Pacific Islander, 0.36% from other races, and 0.73% from two or more races. Hispanic or Latino of any race were 1.18% of the population.

There were 430 households, out of which 42.3% had children under the age of 18 living with them, 55.6% were married couples living together, 12.8% had a female householder with no husband present, and 29.1% were non-families. 25.1% of all households were made up of individuals, and 9.1% had someone living alone who was 65 years of age or older. The average household size was 2.56 and the average family size was 3.08.

In the village, the population was spread out, with 31.1% under the age of 18, 7.1% from 18 to 24, 34.1% from 25 to 44, 17.6% from 45 to 64, and 10.1% who were 65 years of age or older. The median age was 32 years. For every 100 females, there were 97.1 males. For every 100 females age 18 and over, there were 90.7 males.

The median income for a household in the village was $50,724, and the median income for a family was $56,429. Males had a median income of $45,804 versus $33,750 for females. The per capita income for the village was $22,386. About 4.7% of families and 3.7% of the population were below the poverty line, including 4.5% of those under age 18 and 5.5% of those age 65 or over.

== Notable person ==
- John Moolenaar, U.S. representative, former Michigan state senator and state representative
