= Evan Dickens =

American football player

No. 23 – Boston College Eagles
- Position: Running back
- Class: Redshirt Junior

Personal information
- Born: August 30, 2005 (age 21); Marietta, Georgia, U.S.
- Listed height: 5 ft 10 in (1.78 m)
- Listed weight: 195 lb (88 kg)

Career information
- High school: IMG Academy
- College: Georgia Tech (2023–2024); Liberty (2025); Boston College (2026–present)

Awards and highlights
- Second-team All-CUSA (2025)
- Stats at ESPN

Evan Dickens (born August 30, 2005) is an American football running back for the Boston College Eagles. He previously played for the Georgia Tech Yellow Jackets and the Liberty Flames.

== Early life ==
Dickens attended high school at IMG Academy. Coming out of high school, he initially committed to play college football for the Coastal Carolina Chanticleers. However, Dickens later de-committed and signed to play for the Georgia Tech Yellow Jackets.

== College career ==
=== Georgia Tech ===
During his two-year Georgia Tech career from 2023 through 2024, Dickens rushed for 47 yards on 11 carries. After the conclusion of the 2024 season, he entered his name into the NCAA transfer portal.

=== Liberty ===
Dickens transferred to play for the Liberty Flames. In week one of the 2025 season, he notched ten carries for 34 yards, while also catching a pass for 24 yards and a touchdown in a victory over Maine. In week two, Dickens ran for 114 yards and a touchdown on 13 carries versus Jacksonville State. In week seven, he ran 13 times for 50 yards and two touchdowns in a win against New Mexico State. In week ten, Dickens rushed for 217 yards and four touchdowns on 22 carries in a blowout victory over Delaware. In the 2025 regular season finale, he ran for 267 yards and four touchdowns on 43 carries in a double overtime loss to Kennesaw State. Dickens finished his breakout 2025 season, rushing for 1,339 yards and 16 touchdowns on 229 carries, where for his performance he earned first-team all-conference honors. After the conclusion of the 2025 season, he once again entered his name into the NCAA transfer portal.

=== Boston College ===
On January 7, 2026, Dickens announced that he would transfer to Boston College.
