= 2025 Liberty Flames football team =

American college football season

2025 Liberty Flames football
- Conference: Conference USA
- Record: 4–8 (3–5 CUSA)
- Head coach: Jamey Chadwell (3rd season)
- Co-offensive coordinators: Willy Korn (3rd season); Newland Isaac (3rd season)
- Offensive scheme: Up-tempo spread
- Co-defensive coordinators: Kyle Krantz (3rd season); Skylor Magee (3rd season)
- Base defense: Multiple 4–2–5
- Home stadium: Williams Stadium

2025 Conference USA football standings
	Conf.			Overall
Team	W		L	W		L
Kennesaw State y$	7	–	1	10	–	4
Jacksonville State y	7	–	1	9	–	5
Western Kentucky	6	–	2	9	–	4
Louisiana Tech	5	–	3	8	–	5
FIU	5	–	3	7	–	6
Missouri State	5	–	3	7	–	6
Delaware	4	–	4	7	–	6
Liberty	3	–	5	4	–	8
New Mexico State	2	–	6	4	–	8
Middle Tennessee	2	–	6	3	–	9
Sam Houston	1	–	7	2	–	10
UTEP	1	–	7	2	–	10
Championship: Kennesaw State 19, Jacksonville State 15
$ – Conference champion; y – Championship game participant

The 2025 Liberty Flames football team represented Liberty University in Conference USA (CUSA) during the 2025 NCAA Division I FBS football season. The Flames played their home games at Williams Stadium located in Lynchburg, Virginia. They were led by third-year head coach Jamey Chadwell.

The Flames' 4–8 record marked the first time in 20 years that the program finished with a losing record.

== Offseason ==
=== Transfers ===
==== Outgoing ====
Player	Position	Destination
Kylen Austin	WR	Albany
Chris Boti	DL	Arkansas State
Jay Hardy	DL	Auburn
Cesar Carrasco	WR	Bucknell
TJ Bush	DE	California
Kaidon Salter	QB	Colorado
Jason Duclona	DB	East Tennessee State
Joshua Wiggins	DB	East Texas A&M
James Jointer Jr.	RB	Eastern Michigan
Victor Jones Jr.	WR	Florida A&M
Jayden Sweeney	S	Florida Atlantic
Markel Fortenberry	WR	Gardner–Webb
Nate Hampton	QB	Gardner–Webb
Izaiah Taylor	OL	Georgia Military College
Kristyane Gregory	DL	Georgia Military College
Roderick Daniels	DE	Kennesaw State
Marius Landsfeld	DL	Mercer
Larry Jones III	DE	New Mexico State
Xavior Gray	OL	Northwestern
Barrett Newman	LB	Northwestern State
Teagen Lenderink	P	Saginaw Valley State
Jabin Ford	S	South Carolina State
Dominick Hill	DB	Southern Miss
Eliyt Nairne	DL	Tulane
Jordan Hall	OL	Tulane
Marquis Bell	DB	UC Davis
Jamauri Knox	WR	UNC Pembroke
Jordan White	OL	Vanderbilt
Miles McEachin Jr.	QB	VUL
Rex Lahr	OL	Youngstown State
Victor Venn	RB	Unknown
Nick Brown	K	Unknown
Bryce Dixon	DL	Withdrawn

==== Incoming ====
Player	Position	Previous school
Markus Clark	DT	Appalachian State
Derrell Farrar	LB	Appalachian State
Ethan Vasko	QB	Coastal Carolina
Jamari Person	WR	Colorado State
Deuce Spurlock II	LB	Florida
Christian Williams	OL	Florida
Aaron Hester	DE	Florida State
Evan Dickens	RB	Georgia Tech
Jayden Whaley	S	Hampton
Joep Engbers	OL	Illinois
Jiquavious Marshall	DB	Kentucky
Micah Pollard	LB	Michigan
DJ Jackson	DL	NC State
Michael Merdinger	QB	North Carolina
Joe Strickland	DL	Purdue
Tyrell Greene Jr.	RB	Towson
Trey Bedosky	OL	UAB
Casey Cain	WR	UNLV
Tyler Black	K	Wake Forest
Jalon Rock	DB	Weber State
Erwil Anthony Jr.	OL	Wingate

== Schedule ==
Date	Time	Opponent	Site	TV	Result	Attendance
August 30	4:00 p.m.	Maine*	Williams Stadium; Lynchburg, VA	ESPN+	W 28–7	20,337
September 6	12:00 p.m.	at Jacksonville State	AmFirst Stadium; Jacksonville, AL	CBSSN	L 24–34	20,755
September 13	5:00 p.m.	at Bowling Green*	Doyt Perry Stadium; Bowling Green, OH	ESPN+	L 13–23	23,159
September 20	3:30 p.m.	James Madison*	Williams Stadium; Lynchburg, VA (Battle of the Blue Ridge)	ESPNU	L 13–31	24,022
September 27	6:00 p.m.	at Old Dominion*	S.B. Ballard Stadium; Norfolk, VA	ESPN+	L 7–21	18,435
October 8	8:00 p.m.	at UTEP	Sun Bowl; El Paso, TX	CBSSN	W 19–8	9,286
October 14	7:00 p.m.	New Mexico State	Williams Stadium; Lynchburg, VA	CBSSN	W 30–27	16,312
November 1	3:30 p.m.	Delaware^{†}	Williams Stadium; Lynchburg, VA	CBSSN	W 59–30	18,455
November 8	1:00 p.m.	Missouri State	Williams Stadium; Lynchburg, VA	ESPN+	L 17–21	18,407
November 15	5:00 p.m.	at FIU	Pitbull Stadium; Miami, FL	ESPN+	L 27–34 ^{OT}	14,167
November 22	3:00 p.m.	at Louisiana Tech	Joe Aillet Stadium; Ruston, LA	ESPN+	L 28–34 ^{OT}	10,107
November 29	3:30 p.m.	Kennesaw State	Williams Stadium; Lynchburg, VA	CBSSN	L 42–48 ^{2OT}	12,695
*Non-conference game; ^{†}Homecoming; All times are in Eastern time

== Game summaries ==
=== vs. Maine (FCS) ===
Game One – Maine Black Bears (FCS) (0–0) at Liberty Flames (0–0) – Game summary

Quarter	1	2	3	4	Total
Black Bears (FCS)	0	7	0	0	7
Flames	0	7	0	21	28

at Williams Stadium • Lynchburg, Virginia

- Date: Saturday August 30, 2025
- Game time: 4:00 PM EST
- Game weather: Sunny 76 °F (24 °C)
- Game attendance: 20,337
- Referee: David Burge
- TV announcers (ESPN+): Matt Warner (play-by-play), Joe Jauch (analyst) and Annie Cory (sideline)

Game information

First quarter

- No scoring plays.

Second quarter

- ME – Sincere Baines 77-yard run (Samuel Trembley kick), 13:58. Black Bears 7–0. Drive: 1 play, 77 yards, 0:13.
- LIB – Reese Smith 9-yard pass from Ethan Vasko (Jay Billingsley kick), 0:07. Tied 7–7. Drive: 3 plays, 38 yards, 0:17.

Third quarter

- No scoring plays.

Fourth quarter

- LIB – Evan Dickens 24-yard pass from Ethan Vasko (Jay Billingsley kick), 10:24. Flames 14–7. Drive: 6 plays, 62 yards, 1:39.
- LIB – Donte Lee Jr. 16-yard pass from Ethan Vasko (Jay Billingsley kick), 4:33. Flames 21–7. Drive: 10 plays, 48 yards, 5:03.
- LIB – Ethan Vasko 13-yard run (Jay Billingsley kick), 2:38. Flames 28–7. Drive: 4 plays, 32 yards, 1:02.

Statistics	ME	LIB
First downs	15	22
Plays–yards	63–316	73–391
Rushes–yards	32–184	40–194
Passing yards	132	197
Passing: Comp–Att–Int	13–31–1	19–33–0
Turnovers	2	0
Time of possession	26:26	33:34

Team	Category	Player	Statistics
Maine	Passing	Carter Peevy	13/31, 132 yards, INT
Maine	Rushing	Sincere Baines	11 carries, 118 yards, TD
Maine	Receiving	Molayo Irefin	3 receptions, 35 yards
Liberty	Passing	Ethan Vasko	19/33, 197 yards, 3 TD
Liberty	Rushing	Ethan Vasko	13 carries, 63 yards, TD
Liberty	Receiving	Reese Smith	6 receptions, 46 yards, TD

=== at Jacksonville State ===
Game Two – Liberty Flames (1–0) at Jacksonville State Gamecocks (0–1) – Game summary

Quarter	1	2	3	4	Total
Flames	7	3	0	14	24
Gamecocks	7	10	7	10	34

at AmFirst Stadium • Jacksonville, AL

- Date: Saturday September 6, 2025
- Game time: 11:00 a.m.
- Game weather: Sunny 81 °F (27 °C)
- Game attendance: 20,755
- Referee: Rodney Burnette
- TV announcers (CBSSN): Jordan Kent (play-by-play) and Adam Breneman (analyst)

Game information

First quarter

- JVST – Andrew Paul 3-yard run (Garrison Rippa kick), 9:58. Gamecocks 7–0. Drive: 4 plays, 40 yards, 1:43.
- LIB – Julian Gray 72-yard pass from Ethan Vasko (Jay Billingsley kick), 4:09. Tied 7–7. Drive: 5 plays, 95 yards, 2:47.

Second quarter

- JVST – Cam Cook 11-yard run (Garrison Rippa kick), 12:35. Gamecocks 14–7. Drive: 6 plays, 53 yards, 2:25.
- JVST – Garrison Rippa 50-yard field goal, 3:08. Gamecocks 17–7. Drive: 11 plays, 33 yards, 5:12.
- LIB – Jay Billingsley 35-yard field goal, 0:00. Gamecocks 17–10. Drive: 11 plays, 69 yards, 3:02.

Third quarter

- JVST – Cam Cook 1-yard run (Garrison Rippa kick), 7:13. Gamecocks 24–10. Drive: 8 plays, 83 yards, 3:49.

Fourth quarter

- LIB – Evan Dickens 52-yard run (Jay Billingsley kick), 12:47. Gamecocks 24–17. Drive: 3 plays, 72 yards, 1:28.
- JVST – Gavin Wimsatt 3-yard run (Garrison Rippa kick), 8:33. Gamecocks 31–17. Drive: 10 plays, 75 yards, 4:14.
- LIB – Donte Lee Jr. 62-yard pass from Ethan Vasko (Brayden Beck kick), 7:16. Gamecocks 31–24. Drive: 3 plays, 82 yards, 1:11.
- JVST – Garrison Rippa 24-yard field goal, 4:08. Gamecocks 34–24. Drive: 7 plays, 58 yards, 3:08.

Statistics	LIB	JVST
First downs	20	18
Plays–yards	66–534	62–390
Rushes–yards	37–199	50–338
Passing yards	335	52
Passing: Comp–Att–Int	19–29–1	6–12–0
Turnovers	2	0
Time of possession	29:36	30:24

Team	Category	Player	Statistics
Liberty	Passing	Ethan Vasko	19/29, 335 yards, 2 TD, INT
Liberty	Rushing	Evan Dickens	13 carries, 114 yards, TD
Liberty	Receiving	Donte Lee Jr.	2 receptions, 74 yards, TD
Jacksonville State	Passing	Gavin Wimsatt	6/12, 52 yards
Jacksonville State	Rushing	Cam Cook	29 carries, 195 yards, 2 TD
Jacksonville State	Receiving	Caleb Coombs	2 receptions, 24 yards

=== at Bowling Green ===
Game Three – Liberty Flames (1–1) at Bowling Green Falcons (1–1) – Game summary

Quarter	1	2	3	4	Total
Flames	0	0	7	6	13
Falcons	3	7	3	10	23

at Doyt Perry Stadium • Bowling Green, OH

- Date: Saturday September 13, 2025
- Game time: 5:00 p.m.
- Game weather: Cloudy • Temperature: 76 °F (24 °C) • Wind: NE at 6 miles per hour (9.7 km/h)
- Game attendance: 23,159
- Referee: Ron Hudson
- TV announcers (ESPN+): Michael Reghi (play-by-play) and Marcus Ray (analyst)

Game information

First quarter

- (8:44) BGSU – Jackson Kleather 48-yard field goal (Drive: 10 plays, 29 yards, 4:52; Bowling Green 3–0)

Second quarter

- (0:08) BGSU – Jacob Harris 12-yard pass from Drew Pyne, Jackson Kleather kick (Drive: 5 plays, 23 yards, 0:21; Bowling Green 10–0)

Third quarter

- (7:10) LIB – Donte Lee Jr. 44-yard pass from Ethan Vasko, Brayden Beck kick (Drive: 8 plays, 78 yards, 4:17; Bowling Green 10–7)
- (1:23) BGSU – Jackson Kleather 26-yard field goal (Drive: 13 plays, 67 yards, 5:44; Bowling Green 13–7)

Fourth quarter

- (13:43) BGSU – Jackson Kleather 50-yard field goal (Drive: 5 plays, 19 yards, 1:11; Bowling Green 16–7)
- (11:48) BGSU – Chris McMillian 7-yard run, Jackson Kleather kick (Drive: 2 plays, 26 yards, 0:29; Bowling Green 23–7)
- (2:46) LIB – Evan Dickens 12-yard run (Drive: 8 plays, 75 yards, 2:16; Bowling Green 23–13)

Statistics	LIB	BGSU
First downs	17	17
Plays–yards	64–346	68–304
Rushes–yards	39–152	36–158
Passing yards	194	146
Passing: Comp–Att–Int	13–25–2	16–32–0
Turnovers	4	0
Time of possession	28:51	31:09

Team	Category	Player	Statistics
Liberty	Passing	Ethan Vasko	13/24, 194 yards, TD, 2 INT
Liberty	Rushing	Evan Dickens	15 carries, 96 yards, TD
Liberty	Receiving	Donte Lee Jr.	3 receptions, 77 yards, TD
Bowling Green	Passing	Drew Pyne	16/31, 146 yards, TD
Bowling Green	Rushing	Kaderris Roberts	10 carries, 59 yards
Bowling Green	Receiving	RJ Garcia II	3 receptions, 38 yards

=== vs. James Madison ===
Game Four – James Madison Dukes (1–1) at Liberty Flames (1–2) – Game summary

Quarter	1	2	3	4	Total
Dukes	3	7	7	14	31
Flames	3	7	3	0	13

at Williams Stadium • Lynchburg, Virginia

- Date: Saturday September 20, 2025
- Game time: 6:00 p.m.
- Game weather: Sunny • Temperature: 85 °F (29 °C) • Wind: E 6 mph
- Game attendance: 24,022
- Referee: Steven Robinson
- TV announcers (ESPNU): Courtney Lyle (play-by-play) and Rene Ingoglia (analyst)

Game information

First quarter

- (9:42) JMU – Morgan Suarez 39-yard field goal (Drive: 12 plays, 54 yards, 5:18; James Madison 3–0)
- (4:55) LIB – Jay Billingsley 47-yard field goal (Drive: 11 plays, 46 yards, 4:47; Tied 3–3)

Second quarter

- (5:34) LIB – Ethan Vasko 2-yard run, Jay Billingsley kick (Drive: 10 plays, 74 yards, 4:34; Liberty 10–3)
- (1:19) JMU – Landon Ellis 21-yard pass from Alonza Barnett III, Morgan Suarez kick (Drive: 8 plays, 77 yards, 4:07; Tied 10–10)

Third quarter

- (8:06) LIB – Jay Billingsley 35-yard field goal (Drive: 13 plays, 59 yards, 6:54; Liberty 13–10)
- (3:32) JMU – Wayne Knight 1-yard run, Morgan Suarez kick (Drive: 9 plays, 81 yards, 4:27; James Madison 17–13)

Fourth quarter

- (11:07) JMU – Alonza Barnett III 9-yard run, Morgan Suarez kick (Drive: 11 plays, 67 yards, 5:52; James Madison 24–13)
- (2:31) JMU – Alonza Barnett III 13-yard run, Morgan Suarez kick (Drive: 8 plays, 68 yards, 4:05; James Madison 31–13)

Statistics	JMU	LIB
First downs	24	16
Plays–yards	67–440	63–233
Rushes–yards	42–227	42–158
Passing yards	213	75
Passing: Comp–Att–Int	17–25–1	7–21–0
Turnovers	1	0
Time of possession	33:03	26:57

Team	Category	Player	Statistics
James Madison	Passing	Alonza Barnett III	17/25, 213 yards, TD, INT
James Madison	Rushing	Wayne Knight	17 carries, 89 yards, TD
James Madison	Receiving	Jaylan Sanchez	4 receptions, 51 yards
Liberty	Passing	Ethan Vasko	4/10, 37 yards
Liberty	Rushing	Evan Dickens	17 carries, 67 yards
Liberty	Receiving	Jamari Person	2 receptions, 29 yards

=== at Old Dominion ===
Game Five – Liberty Flames (1–3) at Old Dominion Monarchs (2–1) – Game summary

Quarter	1	2	3	4	Total
Flames	0	0	7	0	7
Monarchs	0	14	0	7	21

at S.B. Ballard Stadium • Norfolk, VA

- Date: Saturday September 27, 2025
- Game time: 6:00 p.m.
- Game weather: Rain • Temperature: 78 °F (26 °C) • Wind: NW 5 mph
- Game attendance: 18,435
- Referee: Douglas Mercer
- TV announcers (ESPN+): Scott Jackson (play-by-play) and Andy Mashaw (analyst)

Game information

First quarter

- No scoring plays.

Second quarter

- (7:34) ODU – TJ Johnson 22-yard pass from Colton Joseph, Riley Callaghan kick (Drive: 5 plays, 69 yards, 1:54; Old Dominion 7–0)
- (4:01) ODU – Ja'Cory Thomas 31-yard pass from Colton Joseph, Riley Callaghan kick (Drive: 4 plays, 78 yards, 1:18; Old Dominion 14–0)

Third quarter

- (9:11) LIB – Julian Gray 4-yard run, Jay Billingsley kick (Drive: 4 plays, 64 yards, 1:45; Old Dominion 14–7)

Fourth quarter

- (13:17) ODU – Ja'Cory Thomas 55-yard pass from Colton Joseph, Riley Callaghan kick (Drive: 2 plays, 56 yards, 0:40; Old Dominion 21–7)

Statistics	LIB	ODU
First downs	12	25
Plays–yards	56–210	71–489
Rushes–yards	44–133	45–218
Passing yards	77	271
Passing: Comp–Att–Int	6–12–1	18–26–1
Turnovers	3	4
Time of possession	26:38	31:19

Team	Category	Player	Statistics
Liberty	Passing	Michael Merdinger	6/11, 77 yards
Liberty	Rushing	Caden Williams	19 carries, 92 yards
Liberty	Receiving	Donte Lee Jr.	1 reception, 53 yards
Old Dominion	Passing	Colton Joseph	18/26, 271 yards, 3 TD, INT
Old Dominion	Rushing	Colton Joseph	15 carries, 76 yards
Old Dominion	Receiving	Ja'Cory Thomas	5 receptions, 114 yards, 2 TD

=== at UTEP ===
Game Six – Liberty Flames (1–4) at UTEP Miners (1–4) – Game summary

Quarter	1	2	3	4	Total
Flames	7	6	6	0	19
Miners	0	0	0	8	8

at Sun Bowl • El Paso, TX

- Date: Wednesday October 8, 2025
- Game time: 8:00 p.m.
- Game weather: Sunny • Temperature: 79 °F (26 °C)
- Game attendance: 9,286
- Referee: Rodney Burnette
- TV announcers (CBSSN): Alex Del Barrio (play-by-play) and Adam Breneman (analyst)

Game information

First quarter

- (6:21) LIB – Ethan Vasko 2-yard run, Jay Billingsley kick (Drive: 12 plays, 94 yards, 6:32; Liberty 7–0)

Second quarter

- (14:53) LIB – Jay Billingsley 27-yard field goal (Drive: 11 plays, 62 yards, 4:23; Liberty 10–0)
- (8:25) LIB – Jay Billingsley 29-yard field goal (Drive: 11 plays, 45 yards, 5:10; Liberty 13–0)

Third quarter

- (11:18) LIB – Jay Billingsley 50-yard field goal (Drive: 9 plays, 43 yards, 3:42; Liberty 16–0)
- (7:27) LIB – Jay Billingsley 41-yard field goal (Drive: 6 plays, 38 yards, 2:42; Liberty 19–0)

Fourth quarter

- (11:39) UTEP – Skyler Locklear 13-yard run, Josh Schuchts pass (Drive: 8 plays, 65 yards, 3:16; Liberty 19–8)

Statistics	LIB	UTEP
First downs	22	9
Plays–yards	83–403	52–167
Rushes–yards	50–160	25–56
Passing yards	243	111
Passing: Comp–Att–Int	19–33–0	13–27–2
Turnovers	0	2
Time of possession	39:57	20:03

Team	Category	Player	Statistics
Liberty	Passing	Ethan Vasko	19/33, 243 yards
Liberty	Rushing	Vaughn Blue	17 carries, 75 yards
Liberty	Receiving	Julian Gray	3 receptions, 63 yards
UTEP	Passing	Skyler Locklear	9/17, 90 yards, 2 INT
UTEP	Rushing	Skyler Locklear	8 carries, 58 yards, TD
UTEP	Receiving	Kenny Odom	3 receptions, 53 yards

=== vs. New Mexico State ===
Game Seven – New Mexico State Aggies (3–2) at Liberty Flames (2–4) – Game summary

Quarter	1	2	3	4	Total
Aggies	0	6	14	7	27
Flames	3	17	0	10	30

at Williams Stadium • Lynchburg, Virginia

- Date: Tuesday October 14, 2025
- Game time: 7:00 p.m.
- Game weather: Clear • Temperature: 69 °F (21 °C) • Wind: NE 4 mph
- Game attendance: 16,312
- Referee: Rory Bernard
- TV announcers (CBSSN): Jordan Kent (play-by-play) and Adam Breneman (analyst)

Game information

First quarter

- (2:17) LIB – Jay Billingsley 28-yard field goal (Drive: 8 plays, 54 yards, 4:14; Liberty 3–0)

Second quarter

- (10:04) NMSU – Ryan Hawk 27-yard field goal (Drive: 13 plays, 67 yards, 7:07; Tied 3–3)
- (9:49) LIB – Julian Gray 96-yard kickoff return, Jay Billingsley kick (Liberty 10–3)
- (5:08) LIB – Evan Dickens 8-yard run, Jay Billingsley kick (Drive: 3 plays, 21 yards, 0:51; Liberty 17–3)
- (1:07) NMSU – Ryan Hawk 24-yard field goal (Drive: 10 plays, 68 yards, 4:01; Liberty 17–6)
- (0:11) LIB – Jay Billingsley 43-yard field goal (Drive: 7 plays, 33 yards, 0:56; Liberty 20–6)

Third quarter

- (8:43) NMSU – Kadarius Calloway 2-yard run, Ryan Hawk kick (Drive: 9 plays, 36 yards, 4:07; Liberty 20–13)
- (1:23) NMSU – Donovan Faupel 20-yard pass from Logan Fife, Ryan Hawk kick (Drive: 11 plays, 60 yards, 4:33; Tied 20–20)

Fourth quarter

- (12:19) NMSU – Brodie Malone-Bradford 20-yard pass from Logan Fife, Ryan Hawk kick (Drive: 6 plays, 40 yards, 2:32; New Mexico State 27–20)
- (8:21) LIB – Jay Billingsley 29-yard field goal (Drive: 4 plays, 3 yards, 0:51; New Mexico State 27–23)
- (0:36) LIB – Evan Dickens 8-yard run, Jay Billingsley kick (Drive: 13 plays, 92 yards, 3:10; Liberty 30–27)

Statistics	NMSU	LIB
First downs	23	19
Plays–yards	75–388	60–293
Rushes–yards	38–146	30–114
Passing yards	242	179
Passing: Comp–Att–Int	20–37–0	20–30–2
Turnovers	2	3
Time of possession	33:53	26:07

Team	Category	Player	Statistics
New Mexico State	Passing	Logan Fife	20/37, 242 yards, 2 TD
New Mexico State	Rushing	Kadarius Calloway	18 carries, 84 yards, TD
New Mexico State	Receiving	TK King	5 receptions, 68 yards
Liberty	Passing	Ethan Vasko	20/30, 179 yards, 2 INT
Liberty	Rushing	Evan Dickens	13 carries, 50 yards, 2 TD
Liberty	Receiving	Donte Lee Jr.	6 receptions, 55 yards

=== vs. Delaware ===
Game Eight – Delaware Fightin' Blue Hens (4–3) at Liberty Flames (3–4) – Game summary

Quarter	1	2	3	4	Total
Fightin' Blue Hens	3	6	15	6	30
Flames	7	21	21	10	59

at Williams Stadium • Lynchburg, Virginia

- Date: Saturday November 1, 2025
- Game time: 3:30 p.m. EDT
- Game weather: Sunny • Temperature: 63 °F (17 °C) • Wind: W at 5 miles per hour (8.0 km/h)
- Game attendance: 18,455
- Referee: Ron Hudson
- TV announcers (CBSSN): Dave Ryan (play-by-play), Adam Breneman (analyst) and Patrick Peterson (analyst)

Game information

First quarter

- (11:29) DEL – Nate Reed 42-yard field goal (Drive: 9 plays, 50 yards, 3:31; Delaware 3–0)
- (6:02) LIB – Ethan Vasko 15-yard run, Jay Billingsley kick (Drive: 10 plays, 75 yards, 5:27; Liberty 7–3)

Second quarter

- (14:05) DEL – Nate Reed 28-yard field goal (Drive: 15 plays, 64 yards, 6:57; Liberty 7–6)
- (11:18) LIB – Evan Dickens 5-yard run, Jay Billingsley kick (Drive: 2 plays, 21 yards, 0:16; Liberty 14–6)
- (2:57) LIB – Evan Dickens 1-yard run, Jay Billingsley kick (Drive: 13 plays, 79 yards, 6:53; Liberty 21–6)
- (1:39) LIB – Evan Dickens 30-yard run, Jay Billingsley kick (Drive: 2 plays, 30 yards, 0:13; Liberty 28–6)
- (0:00) DEL – Nate Reed 42-yard field goal (Drive: 9 plays, 50 yards, 1:39; Liberty 28–9)

Third quarter

- (14:30) LIB – Evan Dickens 72-yard run, Jay Billingsley kick (Drive: 2 plays, 75 yards, 0:30; Liberty 35–9)
- (12:58) DEL – Elijah Sessoms 8-yard pass from Nick Minicucci, Nate Reed kick (Drive: 5 plays, 69 yards, 1:24; Liberty 35–16)
- (5:49) DEL – Donovan Lewis 3-yard pass from Nick Minicucci, Nate Reed kick (Drive: 12 plays, 57 yards, 4:14; Liberty 35–24)
- (3:07) LIB – Jacob Jenkins 15-yard pass from Ethan Vasko, Jay Billingsley kick (Drive: 5 plays, 75 yards, 2:42; Liberty 42–24)
- (0:28) LIB – Donte Lee Jr. 31-yard pass from Ethan Vasko, Jay Billingsley kick (Drive: 2 plays, 34 yards, 0:39; Liberty 49–24)

Fourth quarter

- (12:57) DEL – Nick Minicucci 12-yard run (Drive: 7 plays, 69 yards, 2:22; Liberty 49–30)
- (9:05) LIB – Vaughn Blue 12-yard run, Jay Billingsley kick (Drive: 7 plays, 75 yards, 3:52; Liberty 56–30)
- (4:49) LIB – Brayden Beck 32-yard field goal (Drive: 7 plays, 46 yards, 3:24; Liberty 59–30)

Statistics	DEL	LIB
First downs	18	25
Plays–yards	75–420	64–561
Rushes–yards	26–76	41–282
Passing yards	344	279
Passing: Comp–Att–Int	29–49–1	16–23–0
Turnovers	1	0
Time of possession	28:30	31:30

Team	Category	Player	Statistics
Delaware	Passing	Nick Minicucci	29/49, 344 yards, 2 TD, INT
Delaware	Rushing	Nick Minicucci	8 carries, 37 yards, TD
Delaware	Receiving	Sean Wilson	5 receptions, 109 yards
Liberty	Passing	Ethan Vasko	14/20, 221 yards, 2 TD
Liberty	Rushing	Evan Dickens	22 carries, 217 yards, 4 TD
Liberty	Receiving	Donte Lee Jr.	5 receptions, 92 yards, TD

=== vs. Missouri State ===
Game Nine – Missouri State Bears (5–3) at Liberty Flames (4–4) – Game summary

Quarter	1	2	3	4	Total
Bears	0	0	7	14	21
Flames	7	3	0	7	17

at Williams Stadium • Lynchburg, VA

- Date: Saturday November 8, 2025
- Game time: 1:00 p.m. EDT
- Game weather: Cloudy • Temperature: 68 °F (20 °C) • Wind: W at 5 miles per hour (8.0 km/h)
- Game attendance: 18,407
- Referee: Douglas Mercer
- TV announcers (ESPN+): Matt Warner (play-by-play), Joe Jauch (analyst) and Annie Cory (sideline)

Game information

First quarter

- (11:24) LIB – Evan Dickens 1-yard run, Jay Billingsley kick (Drive: 7 plays, 75 yards, 3:27; Liberty 7–0)

Second quarter

- (0:00) LIB – Jay Billingsley 38-yard field goal (Drive: 15 plays, 71 yards, 1:48; Liberty 10–0)

Third quarter

- (4:47) MOST – Jmariyae Robinson 28-yard pass from Jacob Clark, Yousef Obeid kick (Drive: 6 plays, 60 yards, 2:07; Liberty 10–7)

Fourth quarter

- (11:54) MOST – Jacob Clark 1-yard run, Yousef Obeid kick (Drive: 8 plays, 80 yards, 4:12; Missouri State 14–10)
- (8:10) LIB – Ethan Vasko 3-yard run, Jay Billingsley kick (Drive: 8 plays, 75 yards, 3:44; Liberty 17–14)
- (0:27) MOST – Tristian Gardner 13-yard pass from Jacob Clark, Yousef Obeid kick (Drive: 4 plays, 70 yards, 1:00; Missouri State 21–17)

Statistics	MOST	LIB
First downs	20	21
Plays–yards	57–332	78–398
Rushes–yards	24–46	43–202
Passing yards	286	196
Passing: Comp–Att–Int	20–33–0	18–35–1
Turnovers	1	2
Time of possession	26:35	33:25

Team	Category	Player	Statistics
Missouri State	Passing	Jacob Clark	20/33 286 yards, 2 TD
Missouri State	Rushing	Shomari Lawrence	13 carries, 48 yards
Missouri State	Receiving	Tristian Gardner	5 receptions, 80 yards, TD
Liberty	Passing	Ethan Vasko	18/35, 196 yards, INT
Liberty	Rushing	Evan Dickens	28 carries, 127 yards, TD
Liberty	Receiving	Reese Smith	4 receptions, 62 yards

=== at FIU ===
Game Ten – Liberty Flames (4–5) at FIU Panthers (4–5) – Game summary

Quarter	1	2	3	4	OT	Total
Flames	7	14	0	6	0	27
Panthers	7	10	7	3	7	34

at Pitbull Stadium • Miami, FL

- Date: Saturday November 15, 2025
- Game time: 5:00 p.m. EST
- Game weather: Sunny • Temperature: 79 °F (26 °C)
- Game attendance: 14,167
- Referee: Garrett Dickerson
- TV announcers (ESPN+): Corey Brooks (play-by-play), Alejandro Solana (analyst) and Billy Gill (analyst)

Game information

First quarter

- (8:44) LIB – Donte Lee Jr. 15-yard pass from Ethan Vasko, Jay Billingsley kick (Drive: 11 plays, 71 yards, 4:56; Liberty 7–0)
- (8:44) FIU – Joe Pesansky 6-yard run, Noah Grant kick (Drive: 10 plays, 75 yards, 3:44; Tied 7–7)

Second quarter

- (14:56) LIB – Vaughn Blue 2-yard run, Jay Billingsley kick (Drive: 9 plays, 65 yards, 4:59; Liberty 14–7)
- (10:47) FIU – Kejon Owens 9-yard run, Noah Grant kick (Drive: 11 plays, 80 yards, 4:05; Tied 14–14)
- (6:54) LIB – Evan Dickens 1-yard run, Jay Billingsley kick (Drive: 7 plays, 74 yards, 3:47; Liberty 21–14)
- (1:49) FIU – Noah Grant 39-yard field goal (Drive: 13 plays, 58 yards, 5:01; Liberty 21–17)

Third quarter

- (9:32) FIU – Alex Perry 8-yard pass from Joe Pesansky, Noah Grant kick (Drive: 8 plays, 57 yards, 3:45; FIU 24–21)

Fourth quarter

- (13:25) FIU – Noah Grant 40-yard field goal (Drive: 14 plays, 59 yards, 7:43; FIU 27–21)
- (2:48) LIB – Jay Billingsley 38-yard field goal (Drive: 14 plays, 76 yards, 7:28; FIU 27–24)
- (0:00) LIB – Jay Billingsley 48-yard field goal (Drive: 4 plays, 29 yards, 0:20; Tied 27–27)

Overtime

- (0:00) FIU – Maguire Anderson 7-yard pass from Joe Pesansky, Noah Grant kick (Drive: 6 plays, 25 yards, 0:00; FIU 34–27)

Statistics	LIB	FIU
First downs	25	22
Plays–yards	73–378	73–375
Rushes–yards	41–160	39–169
Passing yards	218	206
Passing: Comp–Att–Int	17–32–2	24–34–0
Turnovers	2	0
Time of possession	29:49	30:11

Team	Category	Player	Statistics
Liberty	Passing	Ethan Vasko	17/31, 218 yards, TD, 2 INT
Liberty	Rushing	Evan Dickens	28 carries, 106 yards, TD
Liberty	Receiving	Donte Lee Jr.	5 receptions, 79 yards, TD
FIU	Passing	Joe Pesansky	24/34, 206 yards, 2 TD
FIU	Rushing	Kejon Owens	18 carries, 84 yards, TD
FIU	Receiving	Alex Perry	8 receptions, 88 yards, TD

=== at Louisiana Tech ===
Game Eleven – Liberty Flames (0–0) at Louisiana Tech Bulldogs (0–0) – Game summary

Quarter	1	2	3	4	OT	Total
Flames	3	10	15	0	0	28
Bulldogs	7	0	7	14	6	34

at Joe Aillet Stadium • Ruston, LA

- Date: Saturday November 22, 2025
- Game time: 3:00 p.m. EST
- Game weather: Sunny, 74 °F (23 °C)
- Game attendance: 10,107
- Referee: Rory Bernard
- TV announcers (ESPN+): Malcolm Butler (play-by-play) and Luke McCown (analyst)

Game information

First quarter

- LT – Andrew Burnette 8-yard run (Drew Henderson kick), 8:23. Bulldogs 7–0. Drive: 13 plays, 75 yards, 6:37.
- LU – Jay Billingsley 33-yard field goal, 2:22. Bulldogs 7–3. Drive: 12 plays, 60 yards, 6:01.

Second quarter

- LU – Jay Billingsley 23-yard field goal, 11:12. Bulldogs 7–6. Drive: 9 plays, 80 yards, 3:53.
- LU – Evan Dickens 2-yard run (Jay Billingsley kick), 9:00. Flames 13–7. Drive: 3 plays, 25 yards, 1:12.

Third quarter

- LU – Evan Dickens 2-yard run (Jay Billingsley kick), 13:10. Flames 20–7. Drive: 6 plays, 75 yards, 1:50.
- LU – Jacob Jenkins 6-yard pass from Ethan Vasko (Ethan Vasko run), 7:39. Flames 28–7. Drive: 8 plays, 73 yards, 4:07.
- LT – Trey Kukuk 31-yard run (Kaegan Kent kick), 4:14. Flames 28–14. Drive: 7 plays, 75 yards, 3:25.

Fourth quarter

- LT – Andrew Burnette 3-yard run (Kaegan Kent kick), 10:24. Flames 28–21. Drive: 19 plays, 96 yards, 8:17.
- LT – Trey Kukuk 29-yard run (Kaegan Kent kick), 7:05. Tied 28–28. Drive: 5 plays, 45 yards, 2:05.

Overtime

- LT – Andrew Burnette 25-yard run. Bulldogs 34–28. Drive: 1 play, 25 yards.

Statistics	LU	LT
First downs	23	26
Plays–yards	65–424	75–437
Rushes–yards	44–283	54–319
Passing yards	141	118
Passing: comp–att–int	8–21–4	13–21–1
Turnovers	4	1
Time of possession	27:15	32:45

Team	Category	Player	Statistics
Liberty	Passing	Ethan Vasko	8/21, 141 yards, TD, 4 INT
Liberty	Rushing	Evan Dickens	30 carries, 228 yards, 2 TD
Liberty	Receiving	Caleb Ryan	2 receptions, 72 yards
Louisiana Tech	Passing	Trey Kukuk	13/20, 118 yards
Louisiana Tech	Rushing	Trey Kukuk	19 carries, 143 yards, 2 TD
Louisiana Tech	Receiving	Eli Finley	5 receptions, 58 yards

=== vs. Kennesaw State ===
Game Twelve – Kennesaw State Owls (8-3) at Liberty Flames (4-7) – Game summary

Quarter	1	2	3	4	OT	2OT	Total
Owls	7	7	7	14	7	6	48
Flames	7	7	7	14	7	0	42

at Williams Stadium • Lynchburg, Virginia

- Date: Saturday November 29, 2025
- Game time: 3:30 p.m.
- Game attendance: 12,695
- Referee: Rodney Burnette
- TV announcers (CBSSN): John Sadak (play-by-play), Adam Breneman (analyst) and Patrick Peterson (analyst)

Game information

First quarter

- KENN – Gabriel Benyard 12-yard pass from Amari Odom (Britton Williams kick), 5:29. Owls 7–0. Drive: 7 plays, 45 yards, 3:01.
- LIB – Evan Dickens 6-yard run (Jay Billingsley kick), 1:27. Tied 7–7. Drive: 8 plays, 62 yards, 3:54.

Second quarter

- KENN – Clayton Coppock 5-yard run (Britton Williams kick), 12:49. Owls 14–7. Drive: 9 plays, 75 yards, 3:38.
- LIB – Michael Merdinger 2-yard run (Jay Billingsley kick), 0:00. Tied 14–14. Drive: 10 plays, 50 yards, 1:23.

Third quarter

- KENN – Coleman Bennett 30-yard pass from Amari Odom (Britton Williams kick), 12:55. Owls 21–14. Drive: 5 plays, 74 yards, 1:59.
- LIB – Evan Dickens 5-yard run (Jay Billingsley kick), 2:23. Tied 21–21. Drive: 10 plays, 51 yards, 5:11.

Fourth quarter

- LIB – Evan Dickens 95-yard run (Jay Billingsley kick), 14:46. Flames 28–21. Drive: 2 plays, 97 yards, 0:23.
- KENN – Amari Odom 9-yard run (Britton Williams kick), 12:17. Tied 28–28. Drive: 8 plays, 65 yards, 2:29.
- KENN – Coleman Bennett 1-yard run (Britton Williams kick), 5:35. Owls 35–28. Drive: 10 plays, 87 yards, 4:28.
- LIB – Vaughn Blue 59-yard pass from Michael Merdinger (Jay Billingsley kick), 3:28. Tied 35–35. Drive: 5 plays, 77 yards, 2:02.

Overtime

- LIB – Evan Dickens 25-yard run (Jay Billingsley kick). Flames 42–35. Drive: 1 play, 25 yards.
- KENN – Gabriel Benyard 25-yard pass from Amari Odom (Britton Williams kick). Tied 42–42. Drive: 1 play, 25 yards.

Second overtime

- KENN – Christian Moss 25-yard pass from Amari Odom (pass failed). Owls 48–42. Drive: 1 play, 25 yards.

Statistics	KENN	LIB
First downs	25	24
Plays–yards	67–452	79–503
Rushes–yards	44–212	57–291
Passing yards	240	212
Passing: Comp–Att–Int	14–23–0	12–22–0
Turnovers	0	1
Time of possession	27:03	32:57

Team	Category	Player	Statistics
Kennesaw State	Passing	Amari Odom	14/23, 240 yards, 4 TD
Kennesaw State	Rushing	Coleman Bennett	14 carries, 92 yards, TD
Kennesaw State	Receiving	Gabriel Benyard	4 receptions, 82 yards, 2 TD
Liberty	Passing	Michael Merdinger	12/21, 212 yards, TD
Liberty	Rushing	Evan Dickens	43 carries, 267 yards, 4 TD
Liberty	Receiving	Vaughn Blue	2 receptions, 69 yards, TD
