= List of NCAA Division I FBS conference championship games =

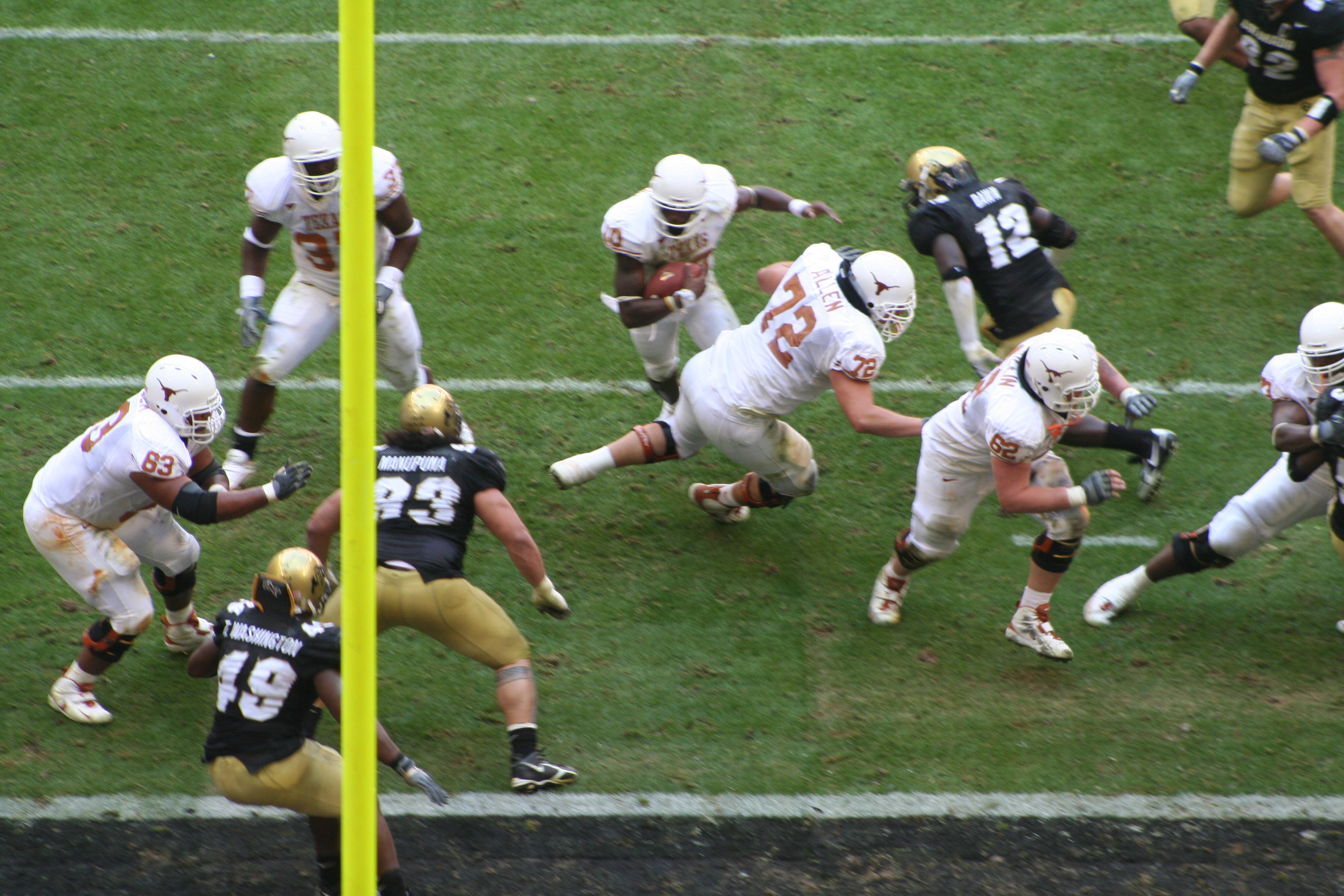
Vince Young (with football) about to score a touchdown in the 2005 Big 12 Championship Game

The following is a list of conference championship games in NCAA Division I Football Bowl Subdivision (FBS) college football. With the Sun Belt Conference holding its first championship game in 2018 and the Pac-12 Conference reinstating its championship game in 2026 after a two-season hiatus, all FBS conferences now have championship games.

Beginning in 2027, the four power conferences (ACC, Big Ten, Big 12, and SEC) will no longer hold conference championship games to accommodate for the expansion of the College Football Playoff to 24 teams.

== History ==
Before the 2016 season, the NCAA required that a conference have a minimum of 12 teams and play in two divisions in order to hold a football championship game that did not count against the limit of 12 regular-season games per team.

=== Twelve-team conferences ===
The first post-regular season conference championship game played in Division I-A football (what is now Division I FBS) was the 1992 SEC Championship Game, won by Alabama over Florida. The SEC had gone from being a 10-team conference in 1991, to being a 12-team conference—divided into two six-team divisions—in 1992. The next championship games to debut were that of the Big 12 Conference and Western Athletic Conference (WAC), starting in 1996. That year, the Big Eight Conference and Southwest Conference dissolved and were essentially replaced by the Big 12, with twelve teams divided into six-team divisions; while the WAC expanded to sixteen teams, divided into eight-team divisions. This was followed in 1997 by the Mid-American Conference, which expanded from ten to twelve teams, divided into six-team divisions. Prior to the 1999 season, eight schools left the WAC to form the Mountain West Conference (MW); the WAC thus discontinued its championship games (the conference would stop sponsoring football after 2012; it reinstated football in 2021 in Division I FCS). New championship games were next added in 2005, when both the Atlantic Coast Conference and Conference USA expanded from eleven teams to twelve teams and implemented six-team divisions.

To date, the Big 12 is the only conference to discontinue and restart its scheduling of championship games.

The requirement for a conference to have 12 teams in order to stage a championship game caused the Big 12 to discontinue its championship game after the 2010 season, as the conference contracted to 10 members in 2011 (while retaining its name).

In 2011, the Big Ten Conference added its twelfth team (while retaining its name), split into six-team divisions, and added a championship game. That same season, what had been the Pacific-10 Conference added two teams, split into six-team divisions, renamed itself the Pac-12 Conference, and initiated its own championship game. The MW grew to twelve teams in 2013, as did the American Athletic Conference (now known as the American Conference) in 2015; both structured themselves into six-team divisions and began staging championship games.

=== Smaller conferences ===
At the conclusion of the 2015 season, only the Big 12 and the Sun Belt Conference (SBC) did not have championship games, as neither conference had the required minimum of 12 teams. In January 2016, the NCAA approved championship games for smaller conferences, provided the championship game features either (1) the top two teams at the end of a full round-robin conference schedule, or (2) the winners of each of two divisions, with each team playing a full round-robin schedule within its division. Following that change to NCAA rules, the Big 12 reinstated its championship game in 2017, operating with 10 teams in a single division while playing a full round-robin schedule.

In 2017, the SBC grew to 12 members with the addition of Coastal Carolina. At that time, the SBC operated with all teams in a single division but did not play a full round-robin schedule and did not hold a championship game. The conference dropped to 10 football members after the football-only memberships of Idaho and New Mexico State were not extended following the 2017 season. The conference announced that it would begin playing a championship game in 2018, which it facilitated by splitting into two five-team divisions. Thus, 2018 was the first season that all FBS conferences held a championship game.

Prior to the 2022 season, the NCAA gave conferences full freedom to determine the participants in their championship games. The Pac-12 scrapped its football divisions, effective immediately, on the very same day that the NCAA passed this rule change, soon followed by the MW and ACC effective in 2023. The Big Ten, MAC, and SEC all eliminated football divisions after the 2023 season, leaving the SBC as the only FBS conference using a divisional alignment in football.

Beginning in the 2024–25 season the top 5 ranked winners of conference receive automatic bids to the College Football Playoff with the four highest-ranked conference champions receiving a bye to the second round. Since every conference champion is decided by a championship game as of that season, the games can serve as de facto playoff qualification games.

With the expansion of the College Football Playoff (CFP) to 24 teams in 2027, the four power conferences (ACC, Big Ten, Big 12, and SEC) will no longer hold conference championship games to accommodate for the playoff beginning in what would be the week after conference championship weekend.

== Championship games ==
Rankings are pre-game and from the AP Poll.

Conference	Inaugural year	Most recent					Venue
Conference	Inaugural year	Date	Winning team		Losing team		Venue
American Conference Championship Game	2015	December 5, 2025	20 Tulane †	34	24 North Texas	21	Yulman Stadium – New Orleans, LA
ACC Championship Game	2005	December 6, 2025	Duke	27 ^{OT}	17 Virginia	20	Bank of America Stadium – Charlotte, NC
Big Ten Championship Game	2011	December 6, 2025	2 Indiana †	13	1 Ohio State †	10	Lucas Oil Stadium – Indianapolis, IN
Big 12 Championship Game	1996 (Note: Discontinued after the 2010 edition; reinstated for 2017 and beyond.)	December 6, 2025	4 Texas Tech †	34	11 BYU	7	AT&T Stadium – Arlington, TX
Conference USA Championship Game	2005	December 5, 2025	Kennesaw State	19	Jacksonville State	15	AmFirst Stadium – Jacksonville, AL
MAC Championship Game	1997	December 6, 2025	Western Michigan	23	Miami (OH)	13	Ford Field – Detroit, MI
Mountain West Championship Game	2013	December 5, 2025	Boise State	38	UNLV	21	Albertsons Stadium – Boise, ID
Pac-12 Championship Game	2011 (Note: Discontinued after the 2023 edition; reinstated for 2026.)	December 1, 2023	3 Washington †	34	5 Oregon	31	Allegiant Stadium – Paradise, NV (Note: The stadium has a Las Vegas mailing address.)
SEC Championship Game	1992	December 6, 2025	3 Georgia †	28	9 Alabama †	7	Mercedes-Benz Stadium – Atlanta, GA
Sun Belt Championship Game	2018	December 5, 2025	25 James Madison †	31	Troy	14	Bridgeforth Stadium – Harrisonburg, VA

† - Denotes team subsequently received a CFP berth

=== Discontinued games ===
Conference	Inaugural year	Final year
WAC Championship Game	1996	1998

== Number of games held ==
Conference	Number of games	Years
Southeastern Conference (SEC)	35	1992-2026
Big 12 Conference (Big 12)	26	1996-2010 and 2017-2026
Atlantic Coast Conference (ACC)	22	2005-2026
Big Ten Conference (B1G)	16	2011-2026
Pac-12 Conference (Pac-12) [As a power conference]	13	2011-2023
