= 2025 Kennesaw State Owls football team =

American college football season

2025 Kennesaw State Owls football

C-USA champion

C-USA Championship, W 19–15 vs. Jacksonville State

Myrtle Beach Bowl, L 6–41 vs. Western Michigan
- Conference: Conference USA
- Record: 10–4 (7–1 CUSA)
- Head coach: Jerry Mack (1st season)
- Offensive coordinator: Mitch Militello (1st season)
- Offensive scheme: Veer and shoot
- Defensive coordinator: Marc Mattioli (1st season)
- Base defense: Multiple 4–2–5
- Home stadium: Fifth Third Stadium

2025 Conference USA football standings
| | Conf. | | | Overall |
| Team | W | | L | W | | L |
|---|---|---|---|---|---|---|
| Kennesaw State y$ | 7 | – | 1 | 10 | – | 4 |
| Jacksonville State y | 7 | – | 1 | 9 | – | 5 |
| Western Kentucky | 6 | – | 2 | 9 | – | 4 |
| Louisiana Tech | 5 | – | 3 | 8 | – | 5 |
| FIU | 5 | – | 3 | 7 | – | 6 |
| Missouri State | 5 | – | 3 | 7 | – | 6 |
| Delaware | 4 | – | 4 | 7 | – | 6 |
| Liberty | 3 | – | 5 | 4 | – | 8 |
| New Mexico State | 2 | – | 6 | 4 | – | 8 |
| Middle Tennessee | 2 | – | 6 | 3 | – | 9 |
| Sam Houston | 1 | – | 7 | 2 | – | 10 |
| UTEP | 1 | – | 7 | 2 | – | 10 |
Championship: Kennesaw State 19, Jacksonville State 15
$ – Conference champion; y – Championship game participant

The 2025 Kennesaw State Owls football team represented Kennesaw State University in Conference USA (CUSA) during the 2025 NCAA Division I FBS football season. Led by first-year head coach Jerry Mack, the Owls played home games at Fifth Third Stadium in Cobb County, Georgia near Kennesaw.

After going 2–10 and finishing tied for last in the CUSA the previous season, the Owls finished the 2025 regular season with an overall record of 9–3, with a conference record of 7–1. The team made the conference title game, facing off against Jacksonville State in a rematch of a regular season game; the Owls won the title game 19–15. The Owls accepted an invite to the Myrtle Beach Bowl, where they lost 6–41 to Western Michigan, finishing the season with an overall record of 10–4. Head coach Jerry Mack was named Conference USA Coach of the Year.

== Schedule ==
| Date | Time | Opponent | Site | TV | Result | Attendance |
|---|---|---|---|---|---|---|
| August 29 | 7:00 p.m. | at Wake Forest* | Allegacy Stadium; Winston-Salem, NC | ACCN | L 9–10 | 30,789 |
| September 6 | 12:00 p.m. | at No. 23 Indiana* | Memorial Stadium; Bloomington, IN | FS1 | L 9–56 | 43,801 |
| September 13 | 6:00 p.m. | Merrimack* | Fifth Third Stadium; Kennesaw, GA | ESPN+ | W 27–13 | 11,040 |
| September 20 | 6:00 p.m. | Arkansas State* | Fifth Third Stadium; Kennesaw, GA | ESPN+ | W 28–21 | 10,713 |
| September 27 | 6:00 p.m. | Middle Tennessee^{†} | Fifth Third Stadium; Kennesaw, GA | ESPN+ | W 24–16 | 11,040 |
| October 9 | 7:00 p.m. | Louisiana Tech | Fifth Third Stadium; Kennesaw, GA | ESPNU | W 35–7 | 9,585 |
| October 21 | 7:00 p.m. | at FIU | Pitbull Stadium; Miami, FL | ESPN2 | W 45–26 | 12,133 |
| October 28 | 8:00 p.m. | UTEP | Fifth Third Stadium; Kennesaw, GA | ESPNU | W 33–20 | 11,040 |
| November 8 | 4:00 p.m. | at New Mexico State | Aggie Memorial Stadium; Las Cruces, NM | ESPN+ | W 24–21 | 11,473 |
| November 15 | 8:00 p.m. | at Jacksonville State | AmFirst Stadium; Jacksonville, AL | ESPNU | L 26–35 | 24,166 |
| November 22 | 2:00 p.m. | Missouri State | Fifth Third Stadium; Kennesaw, GA | ESPN+ | W 41–34 | 11,040 |
| November 29 | 3:30 p.m. | at Liberty | Williams Stadium; Lynchburg, VA | CBSSN | W 48–42 ^{2OT} | 12,695 |
| December 5 | 7:00 p.m. | at Jacksonville State | AmFirst Stadium; Jacksonville, AL (CUSA Championship Game) | CBSSN | W 19–15 | 18,142 |
| December 19 | 11:00 a.m. | vs. Western Michigan | Brooks Stadium; Conway, SC (Myrtle Beach Bowl) | ESPN | L 6–41 | 9,139 |
*Non-conference game; ^{†}Homecoming; Rankings from AP Poll - Released prior to game; All times are in Eastern time

== Game summaries ==
=== at Wake Forest ===
Game One – Kennesaw State Owls (0–0) at Wake Forest Demon Deacons (0–0) – Game summary

| Quarter | 1 | 2 | 3 | 4 | Total |
|---|---|---|---|---|---|
| Owls | 6 | 0 | 3 | 0 | 9 |
| Demon Deacons | 7 | 0 | 3 | 0 | 10 |

at Allegacy Stadium • Winston-Salem, North Carolina

- Date: August 29
- Game time: 7:00 p.m. EDT
- Game weather: 81 °F (27 °C)
- Game attendance: 30,789
- Referee: Nate Black
- TV announcers (ACCN): Chuckie Kempf (play-by-play), Darius Walker (analyst), and Ashley Stroehlein (sideline)
- Box score, Recap

Game information

First quarter

- (7:58) WAKE – Robby Ashford 5-yard run, Connor Calvert kick (Drive: 14 plays, 75 yards, 7:02; WAKE 7–0)
- (4:38) KENN – Coleman Bennett 19-yard run (Drive: 10 plays, 75 yards, 3:17; WAKE 7–6)

Second quarter

- No scoring plays.

Third quarter

- (9:45) KENN – Daniel Kinney 29-yard field goal (Drive: 14 plays, 64 yards, 5:15; KENN 9–7)
- (3:05) WAKE – Connor Calvert 22-yard field goal (Drive: 5 plays, 60 yards, 2:32; WAKE 10–9)

Fourth quarter

- No scoring plays.

| Statistics | KENN | WAKE |
|---|---|---|
| First downs | 18 | 20 |
| Plays–yards | 76–307 | 75–348 |
| Rushes–yards | 43–158 | 47–130 |
| Passing yards | 149 | 218 |
| Passing: Comp–Att–Int | 12–33–0 | 20–28–0 |
| Turnovers | 0 | 0 |
| Time of possession | 24:59 | 35:01 |

| Team | Category | Player | Statistics |
|---|---|---|---|
| Kennesaw State | Passing | Dexter Williams II | 12/33, 149 yards |
| Kennesaw State | Rushing | Coleman Bennett | 17 carries, 66 yards, TD |
| Kennesaw State | Receiving | Gabriel Benyard | 5 receptions, 103 yards |
| Wake Forest | Passing | Robby Ashford | 20/28, 218 yards |
| Wake Forest | Rushing | Robby Ashford | 18 carries, 42 yards, TD |
| Wake Forest | Receiving | Eni Falayi | 4 receptions, 52 yards |

=== at No. 23 Indiana ===
Game Two – Kennesaw State Owls (0–1) at No. 23 Indiana Hoosiers (1–0) – Game summary

| Quarter | 1 | 2 | 3 | 4 | Total |
|---|---|---|---|---|---|
| Owls | 0 | 6 | 3 | 0 | 9 |
| No. 23 Hoosiers | 14 | 7 | 21 | 14 | 56 |

at Memorial Stadium • Bloomington, Indiana

- Date: September 6
- Game time: 12:00 p.m. EDT
- Game weather: Sunny
- Game attendance: 43,801
- Referee: Chris La Mange
- TV announcers (FS1): Tim Brando (play-by-play), Devin Gardner (analyst), and Josh Sims (sideline reporter)
- Box score, Recap

Game information
First quarter
- IU – Riley Nowakowski 1-yard run (Nico Radicic kick), 8:28. Hoosiers 7–0. Drive: 8 plays, 81 yards, 3:35.
- IU – Elijah Sarratt 9-yard pass from Fernando Mendoza (Nico Radicic kick), 3:45. Hoosiers 14–0. Drive: 6 plays, 48 yards, 3:16.

Second quarter

- KENN – Daniel Kinney 28-yard field goal, 5:46. Hoosiers 14–3. Drive: 12 plays, 63 yards, 4:50.
- IU – Lee Beebe Jr. 11-yard run (Nico Radicic kick), 3:40. Hoosiers 21–3. Drive: 4 plays, 75 yards, 2:06.
- KENN – Daniel Kinney 29-yard field goal, 0:28. Hoosiers 21–6. Drive: 7 plays, 64 yards, 3:12.

Third quarter

- KENN – Daniel Kinney 50-yard field goal, 12:39. Hoosiers 21–9. Drive: 6 plays, 44 yards, 2:21.
- IU – Elijah Sarratt 3-yard pass from Fernando Mendoza (Nico Radicic kick), 8:43. Hoosiers 28–9. Drive: 8 plays, 73 yards, 3:52.
- IU – Omar Cooper Jr. 75-yard run (Nico Radicic kick), 6:05. Hoosiers 35–9. Drive: 1 play, 75 yards, 0:17.
- IU – Elijah Sarratt 20-yard pass from Fernando Mendoza (Nico Radicic kick), 2:53. Hoosiers 42–9. Drive: 4 plays, 37 yards, 1:42.

Fourth quarter

- IU – E.J. Williams Jr. 8-yard pass from Fernando Mendoza (Nico Radicic kick), 13:17. Hoosiers 49–9. Drive: 7 plays, 63 yards, 2:51.
- IU – Charlie Becker 6-yard pass from Alberto Mendoza (Nico Radicic kick), 6:03. Hoosiers 56–9. Drive: 8 plays, 87 yards, 4:13.

| Statistics | KENN | IU |
|---|---|---|
| First downs | 10 | 28 |
| Plays–yards | 53–271 | 67–593 |
| Rushes–yards | 32–89 | 39–313 |
| Passing yards | 182 | 280 |
| Passing: comp–att–int | 13–21–1 | 21–28–0 |
| Turnovers | 2 | 0 |
| Time of possession | 27:30 | 32:30 |

| Team | Category | Player | Statistics |
|---|---|---|---|
| Kennesaw State | Passing | Amari Odom | 10/16, 176 yards, INT |
| Kennesaw State | Rushing | Coleman Bennett | 5 carries, 34 yards |
| Kennesaw State | Receiving | Lyndon Ravare | 2 receptions, 72 yards |
| Indiana | Passing | Fernando Mendoza | 18/25, 245 yards, 4 TD |
| Indiana | Rushing | Lee Beebe Jr. | 11 carries, 90 yards, TD |
| Indiana | Receiving | Elijah Sarratt | 9 receptions, 97 yards, 3 TD |

=== vs. Merrimack (FCS) ===
Game Three – Merrimack Warriors (FCS) (1–1) at Kennesaw State Owls (0–2) – Game summary

| Quarter | 1 | 2 | 3 | 4 | Total |
|---|---|---|---|---|---|
| Warriors (FCS) | 0 | 0 | 0 | 13 | 13 |
| Owls | 0 | 7 | 17 | 3 | 27 |

at Fifth Third Stadium • Kennesaw, Georgia

- Date: September 13
- Game time: 6:00 p.m. EDT
- Game weather: Sunny, 83 °F (28 °C)
- Game attendance: 11,040
- Referee: Jereme Tate
- TV announcers (ESPN+): Nolan Alexander (play-by-play), Caleb O'Neal (analyst) and Jade Barkett (sideline)
- Box score, Recap

Game information

First quarter

- No scoring plays.

Second quarter

- KENN – Dexter Williams II 4-yard run (Britton Williams kick), 4:45. Owls 7–0. Drive: 13 plays, 85 yards, 3:56.

Third quarter

- KENN – Gabriel Benyard 7-yard pass from Amari Odom (Birtton Williams kick), 9:47. Owls 14–0. Drive: 4 plays, 39 yards, 1:06.
- KENN – Amari Odom 12-yard run (Britton Williams kick), 7:07. Owls 21–0. Drive: 4 plays, 45 yards, 1:30.
- KENN – Britton Williams 38-yard field goal, 1:07. Owls 24–0. Drive: 8 plays, 47 yards, 2:58.

Fourth quarter

- MRMK – Ayden Pereira 1-yard run (Carlton Thai kick), 10:04. Owls 24–7. Drive: 10 plays, 75 yards, 6:03.
- MRMK – R. J. Chapman 85-yard interception return (pass failed), 7:13. Owls 24–13.
- KENN – Britton Williams 44-yard field goal, 1:55. Owls 27–13. Drive: 9 plays, 24 yards, 5:18.

| Statistics | MRMK | KENN |
|---|---|---|
| First downs | 16 | 21 |
| Plays–yards | 63–294 | 63–369 |
| Rushes–yards | 38–79 | 32–173 |
| Passing yards | 215 | 196 |
| Passing: Comp–Att–Int | 13–25–0 | 21–31–1 |
| Turnovers | 0 | 1 |
| Time of possession | 36:48 | 23:12 |

| Team | Category | Player | Statistics |
|---|---|---|---|
| Merrimack | Passing | Ayden Pereira | 12/23, 181 yards |
| Merrimack | Rushing | Ayden Pereira | 23 carries, 62 yards, TD |
| Merrimack | Receiving | Jalen McDonald | 5 receptions, 116 yards |
| Kennesaw State | Passing | Amari Odom | 12/14, 108 yards, TD |
| Kennesaw State | Rushing | Alexander Diggs | 9 carries, 55 yards |
| Kennesaw State | Receiving | Christian Moss | 6 receptions, 68 yards |

=== vs. Arkansas State ===
Game Four – Arkansas State Red Wolves (1–2) at Kennesaw State Owls (1–2) – Game summary

| Quarter | 1 | 2 | 3 | 4 | Total |
|---|---|---|---|---|---|
| Red Wolves | 0 | 7 | 7 | 7 | 21 |
| Owls | 21 | 0 | 7 | 0 | 28 |

at Fifth Third Stadium • Kennesaw, Georgia

- Date: September 20
- Game time: 6:00 p.m. EDT
- Game weather: Sunny, 86 °F (30 °C)
- Game attendance: 10,713
- Referee: Douglas Mercer
- TV announcers (ESPN+): Nolan Alexander (play-by-play), Caleb O'Neal (analyst) and Maria Martin (sideline)
- Box score, Recap

Game information

First quarter

- KENN – Gabriel Benyard 54-yard pass from Amari Odom (Britton Williams kick), 12:32. Owls 7–0. Drive: 5 plays, 75 yards, 1:37.
- KENN – Alexander Diggs 7-yard run (Britton Williams kick), 8:49. Owls 14–0. Drive: 6 plays, 38 yards, 2:31.
- KENN – Amari Odom 14-yard run (Britton Williams kick), 5:10. Owls 21–0. Drive: 8 plays, 82 yards, 2:44.

Second quarter

- ARST – Hunter Summers 28-yard pass from Jaylen Raynor (Clune Van Andel kick), 0:02. Owls 21–7. Drive: 6 plays, 71 yards, 0:51.

Third quarter

- ARST – Jaylen Raynor 1-yard run (Clune Van Andel kick), 12:03. Owls 21–14. Drive: 3 plays, 49 yards, 1:37.
- KENN – Coleman Bennett 10-yard run (Britton Williams kick), 8:36. Owls 28–14. Drive: 8 plays, 56 yards, 3:21.

Fourth quarter

- ARST – Kenyon Clay 6-yard pass from Jaylen Raynor (Clune Van Andel kick), 10:04. Owls 28–21. Drive: 16 plays, 72 yards, 5:38.

| Statistics | ARST | KENN |
|---|---|---|
| First downs | 18 | 30 |
| Plays–yards | 69–318 | 83–497 |
| Rushes–yards | 28–92 | 49–189 |
| Passing yards | 226 | 308 |
| Passing: Comp–Att–Int | 25–41–0 | 25–34–0 |
| Turnovers | 1 | 3 |
| Time of possession | 26:35 | 33:25 |

| Team | Category | Player | Statistics |
|---|---|---|---|
| Arkansas State | Passing | Jaylen Raynor | 25/41, 226 yards, 2 TD |
| Arkansas State | Rushing | Devin Spencer | 14 carries, 61 yards |
| Arkansas State | Receiving | Hunter Summers | 8 receptions, 114 yards, TD |
| Kennesaw State | Passing | Amari Odom | 25/34, 308 yards, TD |
| Kennesaw State | Rushing | Amari Odom | 16 carries, 101 yards, TD |
| Kennesaw State | Receiving | Gabriel Benyard | 6 receptions, 114 yards, TD |

=== vs. Middle Tennessee ===
Game Five – Middle Tennessee Blue Raiders (1–3) at Kennesaw State Owls (2–2) – Game summary

| Quarter | 1 | 2 | 3 | 4 | Total |
|---|---|---|---|---|---|
| Blue Raiders | 3 | 7 | 0 | 6 | 16 |
| Owls | 21 | 0 | 0 | 3 | 24 |

at Fifth Third Stadium • Kennesaw, Georgia

- Date: September 27
- Game time: 6:00 p.m. EDT
- Game attendance: 11,040
- Referee: Rodney Burnette
- TV announcers (ESPN+): Nolan Alexander (play-by-play), Caleb O'Neal (analyst) and Lexi Bowden (sideline)

Game information

First quarter

- KENN – Gerard Bullock Jr. 13-yard pass from Christian Moss (Britton Williams kick), 13:25. Owls 7–0. Drive: 3 plays, 30 yards, O:39.
- KENN – Chase Belcher 53-yard pass from Amari Odom (Britton Williams kick), 9:06. Owls 14–0. Drive: 5 plays, 87 yards, 1:25.
- MTSU – Jacob Hathaway 34-yard field goal, 3:43. Owls 14–3. Drive: 9 plays, 59 yards, 4:31.
- KENN – Gabriel Benyard 29-yard pass from Amari Odom (Britton Williams kick), 0:11. Owls 21–3. Drive: 3 plays, 62 yards, 0:56.

Second quarter

- MTSU – Jekail Middlebrook 10-yard run (Jacob Hathaway kick), 4:17. Owls 21–10. Drive: 7 plays, 30 yards, 3:31.

Third quarter

- No scoring plays.

Fourth quarter

- MTSU – Jekail Middlebrook 9-yard run (pass failed), 14:56. Owls 21–16. Drive: 12 plays, 89 yards, 5:58.
- KENN – Britton Williams 39-yard field goal, 10:43. Owls 24–16. Drive: 10 plays, 54 yards, 4:13.

| Statistics | MTSU | KENN |
|---|---|---|
| First downs | 24 | 17 |
| Plays–yards | 79–460 | 51–334 |
| Rushes–yards | 37–155 | 31–157 |
| Passing yards | 305 | 177 |
| Passing: Comp–Att–Int | 28–42–1 | 13–20–0 |
| Turnovers | 2 | 1 |
| Time of possession | 38:59 | 21:01 |

| Team | Category | Player | Statistics |
|---|---|---|---|
| Middle Tennessee | Passing | Nicholas Vattiato | 27/41, 278 yards, INT |
| Middle Tennessee | Rushing | Jekail Middlebrook | 20 carries, 109 yards, 2 TD |
| Middle Tennessee | Receiving | Cam'ron Lacy | 8 receptions, 96 yards |
| Kennesaw State | Passing | Amari Odom | 11/17, 162 yards, 2 TD |
| Kennesaw State | Rushing | Coleman Bennett | 12 carries, 101 yards |
| Kennesaw State | Receiving | Chase Belcher | 1 reception, 53 yards, TD |

=== vs. Louisiana Tech ===
Game Six – Louisiana Tech Bulldogs (4–1) at Kennesaw State Owls (3–2) – Game summary

| Quarter | 1 | 2 | 3 | 4 | Total |
|---|---|---|---|---|---|
| Bulldogs | 7 | 0 | 0 | 0 | 7 |
| Owls | 0 | 14 | 7 | 14 | 35 |

at Fifth Third Stadium • Kennesaw, Georgia

- Date: October 9
- Game time: 7:00 p.m. EDT
- Game weather: Sunny • Temperature: 67 °F (19 °C) • Wind: N 8 mph
- Game attendance: 9,585
- Referee: Garrett Dickerson
- TV announcers (ESPNU): Jorge Sedano (play-by-play) and Rodney McLeod (analyst)

Game information

First quarter

- LT – Omiri Wiggins 1-yard run (Drew Henderson kick), 7:12. Bulldogs 7–0. Drive: 13 plays, 70 yards, 4:59.

Second quarter

- KENN – Clayton Coppock 6-yard pass from Dexter Williams II (Britton Williams kick), 8:03. Tied 7–7. Drive: 15 plays, 92 yards, 6:42.
- KENN – Gabriel Benyard 9-yard run (Britton Williams kick), 6:15. Owls 14–7. Drive: 1 play, 9 yards, 0:05.

Third quarter

- KENN – Jordan Jackson 29-yard pass from Dexter Williams II (Britton Williams kick), 9:19. Owls 21–7. Drive: 5 plays, 59 yards, 2:25.

Fourth quarter

- KENN – Lyndon Ravare 7-yard pass from Dexter Williams II (Britton Williams kick), 13:32. Owls 28–7. Drive: 10 plays, 80 yards, 4:37.
- KENN – Coleman Bennett 50-yard pass from Dexter Williams II (Britton Williams kick), 4:45. Owls 35–7. Drive: 11 plays, 87 yards, 7:05.

| Statistics | LT | KENN |
|---|---|---|
| First downs | 21 | 22 |
| Total yards | 75–305 | 63–400 |
| Rushing yards | 40–136 | 27–110 |
| Passing yards | 169 | 290 |
| Passing: Comp–Att–Int | 18–35–2 | 27–36–0 |
| Turnovers | 2 | 0 |
| Time of possession | 29:09 | 30:51 |

| Team | Category | Player | Statistics |
|---|---|---|---|
| Louisiana Tech | Passing | Evan Bullock | 11/21, 112 yards, INT |
| Louisiana Tech | Rushing | Omiri Wiggins | 14 carries, 67 yards, TD |
| Louisiana Tech | Receiving | Marlion Jackson | 3 receptions, 49 yards |
| Kennesaw State | Passing | Dexter Williams II | 27/36, 290 yards, 4 TD |
| Kennesaw State | Rushing | Coleman Bennett | 17 carries, 73 yards |
| Kennesaw State | Receiving | Christian Moss | 4 receptions, 66 yards |

=== at FIU ===
Game Seven – Kennesaw State Owls (4–2) at FIU Panthers (3–3) – Game summary

| Quarter | 1 | 2 | 3 | 4 | Total |
|---|---|---|---|---|---|
| Owls | 14 | 10 | 7 | 14 | 45 |
| Panthers | 7 | 7 | 3 | 9 | 26 |

at Pitbull Stadium • Miami, Florida

- Date: October 21
- Game time: 7:00 p.m. EDT
- Game weather: Cloudy • Temperature: 81 °F (27 °C) • Wind: E 3 mph
- Game attendance: 12,133
- Referee: Larry Clemens
- TV announcers (ESPN2): Clay Matvick (play-by-play) and Chase Daniels (analyst)

Game information

First quarter

- KENN – Amari Odom 2-yard run (Britton Williams kick), 8:25. Owls 7–0. Drive: 7 plays, 80 yards, 3:07.
- KENN – Alexander Diggs 2-yard run (Britton Williams kick), 3:44. Owls 14–0. Drive: 6 plays, 57 yards, 2:12.
- FIU – Anthony Carrie 15-yard run (Noah Grant kick), 0:25. Owls 14–7. Drive: 7 plays, 57 yards, 3:10.

Second quarter

- KENN − Coleman Bennett 76-yard catch from Amari Odom (Britton Williams kick), 14:48. Owls 21−7. Drive: 2 plays, 88 yards, 0:31.
- KENN − Britton Williams 40-yard field goal, 5:04. Owls 24−7. Drive: 13 plays, 51 yards, 4:42.
- FIU − Kejon Owens 43-yard run (Noah Grant kick), 1:49. Owls 24−14. Drive: 8 plays, 75 yards, 3:15.

Third quarter

- FIU − Noah Grant 43-yard field goal, 7:57. Owls 24−17. Drive: 13 plays, 49 yards, 7:03.
- KENN − Christian Moss 70-yard catch from Dexter Williams II (Britton Williams kick), 0:19. Owls 31−17. Drive: 3 plays, 80 yards, 0:53.

Fourth quarter

- FIU − Noah Grant 28-yard field goal, 9:16. Owls 31−20. Drive: 7 plays, 68 yards, 2:14.
- KENN − Dexter Williams II 2-yard run (Britton Williams kick), 2:59. Owls 38−20. Drive: 10 plays, 75 yards, 6:17.
- KENN − Chase Belcher 6-yard run (Britton Williams kick), 1:03, Owls 45−20. Drive: 5 plays, 34 yards, 1:18.
- FIU − Eric Nelson 12-yard catch from Keyone Jenkins (Two-Point Conversion failed), 0:15, Owls 45−26. Drive: 3 plays, 75 yards, 0:48.

| Statistics | KENN | FIU |
|---|---|---|
| First downs | 20 | 23 |
| Plays–yards | 58–498 | 73–518 |
| Rushes–yards | 41–214 | 37–222 |
| Passing yards | 284 | 296 |
| Passing: Comp–Att–Int | 12–17–0 | 22–36–0 |
| Turnovers | 0 | 0 |
| Time of possession | 25:39 | 34:21 |

| Team | Category | Player | Statistics |
|---|---|---|---|
| Kennesaw State | Passing | Amari Odom | 10/15, 205 yards, TD |
| Kennesaw State | Rushing | Alexander Diggs | 11 carries, 69 yards, TD |
| Kennesaw State | Receiving | Gabriel Benyard | 5 receptions, 97 yards |
| FIU | Passing | Keyone Jenkins | 22/36, 296 yards, TD |
| FIU | Rushing | Kejon Owens | 20 carries, 166 yards, TD |
| FIU | Receiving | Alex Perry | 7 receptions, 75 yards |

=== vs. UTEP ===
Game Eight – UTEP Miners (2–5) at Kennesaw State Owls (5–2) – Game summary

| Quarter | 1 | 2 | 3 | 4 | Total |
|---|---|---|---|---|---|
| Miners | 0 | 10 | 10 | 0 | 20 |
| Owls | 14 | 2 | 7 | 10 | 33 |

at Fifth Third Stadium • Kennesaw, Georgia

- Date: October 28
- Game time: 8:00 p.m. EDT
- Game attendance: 11,040
- Referee: Douglas Mercer
- TV announcers (ESPNU): Chuckie Kempf (play-by-play) and Darius Walker (analyst)

Game information

First quarter

- KENN – Caleb Offord 23-yard fumble return (Britton Williams kick), 13:16. Owls 7–0.
- KENN – Gabriel Benyard 57-yard punt return (Britton Williams kick), 6:43. Owls 14–0.

Second quarter

- UTEP – Josh Schuchts 41-yard pass from Skyler Locklear (Carlos Arreola kick), 11:16. Owls 14–7. Drive: 7 plays, 86 yards, 3:38.
- UTEP – Tanner Cragun 38-yard field goal, 3:21. Owls 14–10. Drive: 12 plays, 38 yards, 5:55.
- KENN – Team Safety, 1:31. Owls 16–10.

Third quarter

- UTEP – Kenny Odom 27-yard pass from Skyler Locklear (Carlos Arreola kick), 10:45. Miners 17–16. Drive: 8 plays, 78 yards, 4:11.
- UTEP – Tanner Cragun 26-yard field goal, 3:48. Miners 20–16. Drive: 11 plays, 53 yards, 5:20.
- KENN – Amari Odom 5-yard run (Britton Williams kick), 2:24. Owls 23–20. Drive: 4 plays, 73 yards, 1:16.

Fourth quarter

- KENN – Britton Williams 30-yard field goal, 11:32. Owls 26–20. Drive: 8 plays, 33 yards, 4:10.
- KENN – Chase Belcher 1-yard run (Britton Williams kick), 1:10. Owls 33–20. Drive: 11 plays, 70 yards, 5:22.

| Statistics | UTEP | KENN |
|---|---|---|
| First downs | 17 | 18 |
| Plays–yards | 73–295 | 71–304 |
| Rushes–yards | 43–135 | 39–150 |
| Passing yards | 160 | 154 |
| Passing: Comp–Att–Int | 14–30–0 | 14–32–1 |
| Turnovers | 1 | 1 |
| Time of possession | 30:57 | 29:03 |

| Team | Category | Player | Statistics |
|---|---|---|---|
| UTEP | Passing | Skyler Locklear | 14/29, 160 yards, 2 TD |
| UTEP | Rushing | Skyler Locklear | 23 carries, 77 yards |
| UTEP | Receiving | Kenny Odom | 6 receptions, 51 yards, TD |
| Kennesaw State | Passing | Amari Odom | 6/10, 86 yards |
| Kennesaw State | Rushing | Chase Belcher | 24 carries, 113 yards, TD |
| Kennesaw State | Receiving | Javon Rogers | 1 reception, 66 yards |

=== at New Mexico State ===
Game Nine – Kennesaw State Owls (6–2) at New Mexico State Aggies (3–5) – Game summary

| Quarter | 1 | 2 | 3 | 4 | Total |
|---|---|---|---|---|---|
| Owls | 17 | 7 | 0 | 0 | 24 |
| Aggies | 0 | 7 | 0 | 14 | 21 |

at Aggie Memorial Stadium • Las Cruces, New Mexico

- Date: November 8
- Game time: 4:00 p.m. EST/2:00 p.m. MST
- Game attendance: 11,473
- Referee: Reed Brotherton
- TV announcers (ESPN+): Adam Young (play-by-play) and Danny Knee (analyst)

Game information

First quarter

- KENN – Gabriel Benyard 34-yard pass from Amari Odom (Britton Williams kick), 12:36. Owls 7–0. Drive: 7 plays, 75 yards, 2:24.
- KENN – Gabriel Benyard 23-yard pass from Amari Odom (Britton Williams kick), 8:37. Owls 14–0. Drive: 6 plays, 65 yards, 2:17.
- KENN – Britton Williams 35-yard field goal, 7:33. Owls 17–0. Drive: 4 plays, 3 yards, 0:51.

Second quarter

- KENN – Clayton Coppock 55-yard pass from Amari Odom (Britton Williams kick), 8:27. Owls 24–0. Drive: 3 plays, 72 yards, 0:47.
- NMSU – Dijon Stanley 28-yard run (Ryan Hawk kick), 5:34. Owls 24–7. Drive: 6 plays, 62 yards, 2:47.

Third quarter

- No scoring plays.

Fourth quarter

- NMSU – Donovan Faupel 2-yard pass from Logan Fife (Ryan Hawk kick), 10:35. Owls 24–14. Drive: 10 plays, 85 yards, 3:17.
- NMSU – Donovan Faupel 2-yard pass from Logan Fife (Ryan Hawk kick), 5:28. Owls 24–21. Drive: 10 plays, 68 yards, 3:34.

| Statistics | KENN | NMSU |
|---|---|---|
| First downs | 21 | 26 |
| Plays–yards | 74–427 | 82–316 |
| Rushes–yards | 44–208 | 36–75 |
| Passing yards | 219 | 241 |
| Passing: Comp–Att–Int | 14–30–2 | 28–46–2 |
| Turnovers | 2 | 3 |
| Time of possession | 29:20 | 30:40 |

| Team | Category | Player | Statistics |
|---|---|---|---|
| Kennesaw State | Passing | Amari Odom | 14/30, 219 yards, 3 TD, 2 INT |
| Kennesaw State | Rushing | Coleman Bennett | 16 carries, 86 yards |
| Kennesaw State | Receiving | Gabriel Benyard | 3 receptions, 74 yards, 2 TD |
| New Mexico State | Passing | Logan Fife | 28/46, 241 yards, 2 TD, 2 INT |
| New Mexico State | Rushing | Dijon Stanley | 10 carries, 61 yards, TD |
| New Mexico State | Receiving | TK King | 4 receptions, 49 yards |

=== at Jacksonville State ===
Game Ten – Kennesaw State Owls (7–2) at Jacksonville State Gamecocks (6–3) – Game summary

| Quarter | 1 | 2 | 3 | 4 | Total |
|---|---|---|---|---|---|
| Owls | 7 | 3 | 3 | 13 | 26 |
| Gamecocks | 7 | 15 | 3 | 10 | 35 |

at AmFirst Stadium • Jacksonville, Alabama

- Date: November 15
- Game time: 8:00 p.m. EST/7:00 p.m. CST
- Game weather: Clear, 66 °F (19 °C)
- Game attendance: 24,166
- Referee: Rory Bernard
- TV announcers (ESPNU): Jorge Sedano, Rodney McLeod, and Victoria Arlen

Game information

First quarter

- KENN – Amari Odom 1-yard run (Britton Williams kick), 9:47. Owls 7–0. Drive: 14 plays, 65 yards, 5:13.
- JVST – Caden Creel 18-yard run (Garrison Rippa kick), 5:28. Tied 7–7. Drive: 9 plays, 75 yards, 4:19.

Second quarter

- KENN – Daniel Kinney 43-yard field goal, 4:33. Owls 10–7. Drive: 9 plays, 41 yards, 5:21.
- JVST – Cam Cook 6-yard run (Garrison Rippa kick), 2:42. Gamecocks 14–10. Drive: 5 plays, 75 yards, 1:51.
- JVST – Deondre Johnson 62-yard pass from Gavin Wimsatt (Cade Cunningham run), 0:00. Gamecocks 22–10. Drive: 3 plays, 64 yards, 0:39.

Third quarter

- JVST – Garrison Rippa 32-yard field goal, 6:56. Gamecocks 25–10. Drive: 10 plays, 51 yards, 3:48.
- KENN – Daniel Kinney 25-yard field goal, 2:49. Gamecocks 25–13. Drive: 9 plays, 68 yards, 4:07.

Fourth quarter

- JVST – Caden Creel 15-yard run (Garrison Rippa kick), 10:30. Gamecocks 32–13. Drive: 8 plays, 80 yards, 3:43.
- KENN – Calyton Coppock 10-yard pass from Dexter Williams II (pass failed), 7:55. Gamecocks 32–19. Drive: 8 plays, 82 yards, 2:30.
- KENN – Dexter Williams II 9-yard run (Britton Williams II), 3:22. Gamecocks 32–26. Drive: 6 plays, 49 yards, 1:45.
- JVST – Garrison Rippa 27-yard field goal, 0:21. Gamecocks 35–26. Drive: 7 plays, 65 yards, 3:01.

| Statistics | KENN | JVST |
|---|---|---|
| First downs | 32 | 18 |
| Plays–yards | 90–579 | 56–451 |
| Rushes–yards | 46–217 | 42–252 |
| Passing yards | 362 | 199 |
| Passing: Comp–Att–Int | 27–44–4 | 9–14–0 |
| Turnovers | 4 | 0 |
| Time of possession | 34:22 | 25:38 |

| Team | Category | Player | Statistics |
|---|---|---|---|
| Kennesaw State | Passing | Amari Odom | 19/31, 248 yards, 3 INT |
| Kennesaw State | Rushing | Chase Belcher | 8 carries, 62 yards |
| Kennesaw State | Receiving | Gabriel Benyard | 5 receptions, 100 yards |
| Jacksonville State | Passing | Caden Creel | 8/13, 137 yards |
| Jacksonville State | Rushing | Cam Cook | 27 carries, 132 yards, TD |
| Jacksonville State | Receiving | Deondre Johnson | 2 receptions, 112 yards, TD |

=== vs. Missouri State ===
Game Eleven – Missouri State Bears (7–3) at Kennesaw State Owls (7–3) – Game summary

| Quarter | 1 | 2 | 3 | 4 | Total |
|---|---|---|---|---|---|
| Bears | 3 | 10 | 14 | 7 | 34 |
| Owls | 14 | 0 | 13 | 14 | 41 |

at Fifth Third Stadium • Kennesaw, Georgia

- Date: November 22
- Game time: 2:00 p.m. EST
- Game attendance: 11,040
- Referee: Garrett Dickerson
- TV announcers (ESPN+): Nolan Alexander (play-by-play), Caleb O'Neal (analyst), and Maria Martin (sideline)

Game information

First quarter

- MOST – Yousef Obeid 43-yard field goal, 12:03. Bears 3–0. Drive: 7 plays, 50 yards, 2:57.
- KENN – Clayton Coppock 32-yard pass from Amari Odom (Daniel Kinney kick), 8:46. Owls 7–3. Drive: 9 plays, 85 yards, 3:11.
- KENN – Gabriel Benyard 41-yard pass from Amari Odom (Daniel Kinney kick), 0:35. Owls 14–3. Drive: 10 plays, 80 yards, 4:31.

Second quarter

- MOST – Yousef Obeid 44-yard field goal, 6:19. Owls 14–6. Drive: 12 plays, 71 yards, 6:15.
- MOST – Tristian Gardner 19-yard pass from Jacob Clark (Yousef Obeid kick), 1:09. Owls 14–13. Drive: 5 plays, 80 yards, 0:40.

Third quarter

- MOST – Jmariyae Robinson 10-yard pass from Jacob Clark (Yousef Obeid kick), 9:29. Bears 20–14. Drive: 7 plays, 75 yards, 4:18.
- KENN – Gabriel Benyard 31-yard pass from Amari Odom (Daniel Kinney kick BLOCKED), 5:20. Tied 20–20. Drive: 8 plays, 61 yards, 4:04.
- KENN – Amari Odom 4-yard run (Daniel Kinney kick), 1:41. Owls 27–20. Drive: 5 plays, 34 yards, 2:18.
- MOST – Tristian Gardner 34-yard pass from Jacob Clark (Yousef Obeid kick), 0:24. Tied 27–27. Drive: 3 plays, 75 yards, 1:17.

Fourth quarter

- KENN – Clayton Coppock 26-yard pass from Amari Odom (Daniel Kinney kick), 5:51. Owls 34–27. Drive: 13 plays, 78 yards, 5:06.
- MOST – Shomari Lawrence 70-yard run (Yousef Obeid kick), 5:08. Tied 34–34. Drive: 2 plays, 75 yards, 0:43.
- KENN – Chase Belcher 14-yard pass from Amari Odom (Daniel Kinney kick), 0:27. Owls 41–34. Drive: 3 plays, 61 yards, 0:40.

| Statistics | MOST | KENN |
|---|---|---|
| First downs | 25 | 26 |
| Plays–yards | 62–535 | 79–500 |
| Rushes–yards | 29–191 | 45–113 |
| Passing yards | 344 | 387 |
| Passing: Comp–Att–Int | 23–33–2 | 24–34–0 |
| Turnovers | 2 | 0 |
| Time of possession | 29:21 | 30:39 |

| Team | Category | Player | Statistics |
|---|---|---|---|
| Missouri State | Passing | Jacob Clark | 23/32, 344 yards, 3 TD, 2 INT |
| Missouri State | Rushing | Shomari Lawrence | 20 carries, 173 yards, TD |
| Missouri State | Receiving | Dash Luke | 5 receptions, 73 yards |
| Kennesaw State | Passing | Amari Odom | 24/34, 387 yards, 5 TD |
| Kennesaw State | Rushing | Amari Odom | 16 carries, 32 yards, TD |
| Kennesaw State | Receiving | Gabriel Benyard | 7 receptions, 127 yards, 2 TD |

=== at Liberty ===
Game Twelve – Kennesaw State Owls (8-3) at Liberty Flames (4-7) – Game summary

| Quarter | 1 | 2 | 3 | 4 | OT | 2OT | Total |
|---|---|---|---|---|---|---|---|
| Owls | 7 | 7 | 7 | 14 | 7 | 6 | 48 |
| Flames | 7 | 7 | 7 | 14 | 7 | 0 | 42 |

at Williams Stadium • Lynchburg, Virginia

- Date: November 29
- Game time: 3:30 p.m. EST
- Game attendance: 12,695
- Referee: Rodney Burnette
- TV announcers (CBSSN): John Sadak (play-by-play), Adam Breneman (analyst), and Patrick Peterson (analyst)

Game information

First quarter

- KENN – Gabriel Benyard 12-yard pass from Amari Odom (Britton Williams kick), 5:29. Owls 7–0. Drive: 7 plays, 45 yards, 3:01.
- LIB – Evan Dickens 6-yard run (Jay Billingsley kick), 1:27. Tied 7–7. Drive: 8 plays, 62 yards, 3:54.

Second quarter

- KENN – Clayton Coppock 5-yard run (Britton Williams kick), 12:49. Owls 14–7. Drive: 9 plays, 75 yards, 3:38.
- LIB – Michael Merdinger 2-yard run (Jay Billingsley kick), 0:00. Tied 14–14. Drive: 10 plays, 50 yards, 1:23.

Third quarter

- KENN – Coleman Bennett 30-yard pass from Amari Odom (Britton Williams kick), 12:55. Owls 21–14. Drive: 5 plays, 74 yards, 1:59.
- LIB – Evan Dickens 5-yard run (Jay Billingsley kick), 2:23. Tied 21–21. Drive: 10 plays, 51 yards, 5:11.

Fourth quarter

- LIB – Evan Dickens 95-yard run (Jay Billingsley kick), 14:46. Flames 28–21. Drive: 2 plays, 97 yards, 0:23.
- KENN – Amari Odom 9-yard run (Britton Williams kick), 12:17. Tied 28–28. Drive: 8 plays, 65 yards, 2:29.
- KENN – Coleman Bennett 1-yard run (Britton Williams kick), 5:35. Owls 35–28. Drive: 10 plays, 87 yards, 4:28.
- LIB – Vaughn Blue 59-yard pass from Michael Merdinger (Jay Billingsley kick), 3:28. Tied 35–35. Drive: 5 plays, 77 yards, 2:02.

Overtime

- LIB – Evan Dickens 25-yard run (Jay Billingsley kick). Flames 42–35. Drive: 1 play, 25 yards.
- KENN – Gabriel Benyard 25-yard pass from Amari Odom (Britton Williams kick). Tied 42–42. Drive: 1 play, 25 yards.

Second overtime

- KENN – Christian Moss 25-yard pass from Amari Odom (pass failed). Owls 48–42. Drive: 1 play, 25 yards.

| Statistics | KENN | LIB |
|---|---|---|
| First downs | 25 | 24 |
| Plays–yards | 67–452 | 79–503 |
| Rushes–yards | 44–212 | 57–291 |
| Passing yards | 240 | 212 |
| Passing: Comp–Att–Int | 14–23–0 | 12–22–0 |
| Turnovers | 0 | 1 |
| Time of possession | 27:03 | 32:57 |

| Team | Category | Player | Statistics |
|---|---|---|---|
| Kennesaw State | Passing | Amari Odom | 14/23, 240 yards, 4 TD |
| Kennesaw State | Rushing | Coleman Bennett | 14 carries, 92 yards, TD |
| Kennesaw State | Receiving | Gabriel Benyard | 4 receptions, 82 yards, 2 TD |
| Liberty | Passing | Michael Merdinger | 12/21, 212 yards, TD |
| Liberty | Rushing | Evan Dickens | 43 carries, 267 yards, 4 TD |
| Liberty | Receiving | Vaughn Blue | 2 receptions, 69 yards, TD |

=== at Jacksonville State (Conference USA Championship) ===
2025 Conference USA Football Championship Game
Kennesaw State Owls (9-3) at Jacksonville State Gamecocks (8-4) – Game summary

| Quarter | 1 | 2 | 3 | 4 | Total |
|---|---|---|---|---|---|
| Owls | 0 | 7 | 3 | 9 | 19 |
| Gamecocks | 0 | 0 | 0 | 15 | 15 |

at AmFirst Stadium • Jacksonville, Alabama

- Date: December 5
- Game time: 7:00 p.m. EST/6:00 p.m. CST
- Game weather: Sunny, 43 °F (6 °C)
- Game attendance: 18,142
- Referee: Ron Hudsom
- TV announcers (CBSSN): Rich Waltz (play-by-play), Robert Turbin (analyst), and Jordan Giorgio (sideline)

Game information

First quarter

- No scoring plays.

Second quarter

- KENN – Coleman Bennett 3-yard run (Britton Williams kick), 13:03. Owls 7–0. Drive: 11 plays, 80 yards, 4:33.

Third quarter

- KENN – Britton Williams 38-yard field goal, 9:57. Owls 10–0. Drive: 11 plays, 55 yards, 5:03.

Fourth quarter

- KENN – Cam Cook tackled in own end zone, 12:33. Owls 12–0.
- JVSU – Cam Cook 1-yard run (Garrison Rippa kick), 10:20. Owls 12–7. Drive: 7 plays, 48 yards, 2:04.
- JVSU – Caden Creel 19-yard run (Caden Creel pass to Deondre Johnson), 4:04. Gamecocks 15–12. Drive: 9 plays, 59 yards, 4:16.
- KENN – Navelle Dean 11-yard pass from Amari Odom (Britton Williams kick), 0:51. Owls 19–15. Drive: 11 plays, 75 yards, 3:13.

| Statistics | KENN | JVST |
|---|---|---|
| First downs | 23 | 19 |
| Plays–yards | 68–318 | 62–306 |
| Rushes–yards | 36–72 | 40–210 |
| Passing yards | 246 | 96 |
| Passing: Comp–Att–Int | 26–32–0 | 12–22–1 |
| Turnovers | 1 | 1 |
| Time of possession | 31:12 | 28:48 |

| Team | Category | Player | Statistics |
|---|---|---|---|
| Kennesaw State | Passing | Amari Odom | 26/32, 246 yards, TD |
| Kennesaw State | Rushing | Coleman Bennett | 17 carries, 82 yards, TD |
| Kennesaw State | Receiving | Christian Moss | 5 receptions, 75 yards |
| Jacksonville State | Passing | Caden Creel | 12/21, 96 yards, INT |
| Jacksonville State | Rushing | Caden Creel | 18 carries, 112 yards, TD |
| Jacksonville State | Receiving | Deondre Johnson | 4 receptions, 59 yards |

=== vs. Western Michigan (Myrtle Beach Bowl) ===
2025 Myrtle Beach Bowl
Kennesaw State Owls (10–3) vs. Western Michigan Broncos (9–4) – Game summary

| Quarter | 1 | 2 | 3 | 4 | Total |
|---|---|---|---|---|---|
| Owls | 0 | 0 | 6 | 0 | 6 |
| Broncos | 27 | 7 | 7 | 0 | 41 |

at Brooks Stadium • Conway, South Carolina

- Date: December 19
- Game time: 11:00 a.m. EST
- Game weather: Sunny • Temperature: 61 °F (16 °C) • Wind: W at 15 miles per hour (24 km/h)
- Game attendance: 9,139
- Referee: Jeremy Parker
- TV announcers (ESPN): Matt Schumacker (play-by-play), Dustin Fox (analyst) and Marilyn Payne (sideline)

Game information
First quarter
- WMU – Jalen Buckley 65-yard run (Palmer Domschke kick), 14:42. Broncos 7–0. Drive: 1 play, 65 yards, 0:10.
- WMU – Kershawn Fisher 47-yard fumble return (Palmer Domschke kick), 13:44. Broncos 14–0.
- WMU – Mareyohn Hrabowski 4-yard pass from Broc Lowry (Palmer Domschke kick), 7:39. Broncos 21–0. Drive: 8 plays, 60 yards, 4:49.
- WMU – Blake Bosma 3-yard pass from Broc Lowry (kick failed), 2:38. Broncos 27–0. Drive: 6 plays, 76 yards, 3:14.

Second quarter

- WMU – Devin Miles 2-yard run (Palmer Domschke kick), 7:45. Broncos 34–0. Drive: 3 plays, 14 yards, 1:40.

Third quarter

- WMU – Joey Pope 75-yard interception return (Palmer Domschke kick), 13:26. Broncos 41–0.
- KENN – Javon Rogers 82-yard pass from Amari Odom (kick failed), 4:10. Broncos 41–6. Drive: 4 plays, 94 yards, 2:17.

Fourth quarter

- No scoring plays

| Statistics | KENN | WMU |
|---|---|---|
| First downs | 18 | 18 |
| Plays–yards | 70–378 | 62–423 |
| Rushes–yards | 34–169 | 43–303 |
| Passing yards | 209 | 120 |
| Passing: Comp–Att–Int | 18–36–2 | 12–19–1 |
| Turnovers | 4 | 2 |
| Time of possession | 25:44 | 34:16 |

| Team | Category | Player | Statistics |
|---|---|---|---|
| Kennesaw State | Passing | Amari Odom | 18/35, 209 yards, TD, 2 INT |
| Kennesaw State | Rushing | Chase Belcher | 16 carries, 148 yards |
| Kennesaw State | Receiving | Javon Rogers | 3 receptions, 111 yards, TD |
| Western Michigan | Passing | Broc Lowry | 12/19, 120 yards, 2 TD, INT |
| Western Michigan | Rushing | Jalen Buckley | 8 carries, 174 yards, TD |
| Western Michigan | Receiving | Blake Bosma | 5 receptions, 44 yards, TD |

== Personnel ==
=== Coaching staff ===
| Name | Position |
|---|---|
| Jerry Mack | Head coach |
| Mitch Militello | Offensive coordinator/Quarterbacks coach |
| Marc Mattioli | Defensive coordinator |
| Kyle Blocker | Special teams coordinator/Tight ends coach |
| Jay Clements | Offensive line coach |
| Aston Walter | Running backs coach |
| David Whitlow | Wide receivers coach |
| Jonathan Bradley | Defensive line coach |
| Granville Eastman | Safeties coach |
| William Paruta | Linebackers coach |
| James Williams | Cornerbacks coach |

=== Roster ===
2025 Kennesaw State Owls Football
| Quarterbacks: 2 – Amari Odom – (redshirt) sophomore (6'4, 205); 5 – Dexter Williams II – (redshirt) senior (6'1, 210); 7 – Skyler Williams – freshman (6'3, 215); 11 – Preston Clemmer – sophomore (6'1, 190); 14 – Tommy Ulatowski – (redshirt) junior (6'0, 185); Running backs: 0 – Coleman Bennett – (redshirt) senior (5'11, 185); 3 – Alexander Diggs – (redshirt) junior (5'9, 185); 4 – Chase Belcher – senior (6'1, 218); 23 – Jonathan Mathis – (redshirt) sophomore (6'0, 195); 25 – Joshua Troupe – freshman (5'11, 210); 26 – Rob Brown – (redshirt) junior (6'0, 200); Wide receivers: 1 – Gabriel Benyard – (redshirt) senior (5'10, 185); 6 – Christian Moss – (redshirt) senior (6'3, 190); 8 – Tykeem Wallace – (redshirt) senior (5'9, 165); 9 – Davis Bryson – (redshirt) junior (5'9, 190); 10 – Jordan Jackson – senior (6'3, 210); 12 – Lyndon Ravare – junior (6'0, 165); 15 – Javon Rogers – sophomore (6'0, 170); 16 – Navelle Dean – (redshirt) sophomore (6'0, 185); 18 – Clayton Coppock – freshman (6'1, 165); 19 – Jayce Cora – freshman (6'4, 185); 80 – Josh Williamson – (redshirt) junior (5'10, 145) | Tight ends: 17 – Gerard Bullock Jr. – graduate student (6'1, 225); 84 – Semaj Parker – (redshirt) junior (6'3, 225); 85 – Rowan Darnell – (redshirt) junior (6'4, 215); 86 – Isaiah Williams – sophomore (6'3, 235); 88 – Jamari Harrold – freshman (6'4, 210); Offensive linemen: 52 – Havik Pettigrew – (redshirt) junior (6'0, 270); 55 – Seaburn Hines – (redshirt) senior (6'2, 305); 56 – JaDarious Lee – (redshirt) junior (6'4, 287); 58 – Brandon Best – (redshirt) junior (6'4, 305); 59 – Jamiel Williams – freshman (6'4, 265); 64 – Cameron Williams – (redshirt) senior (6'3, 315); 65 – JT Pennington – (redshirt) senior (6'4, 305); 66 – Chase Stevens – (redshirt) freshman (6'3, 310); 68 – Benton Dunn – sophomore (6'3, 295); 70 – Chrisdasson Saint-Jean – (redshirt) freshman (6'7, 310); 71 – ZaMario Woodgett – freshman (6'5, 280); 72 – Haston Crawford – freshman (6'6, 300); 73 – Casey Jean-Baptiste – (redshirt) sophomore (6'5, 355); 74 – Elijah Zollicoffer – senior (6'5, 345); 75 – Josiah Chenault – (redshirt) sophomore (6'3, 300); 76 – Nikola Milovac – (redshirt) sophomore (6'6, 315); 77 – Rene Miller – (redshirt) junior (6'6, 335); 78 – Benjamin Kienz – sophomore (6'7, 295) | Defensive linemen: 5 – Tylon Dunlap – (redshirt) senior (6'1, 260); 6 – Marcus Patterson – (redshirt) junior (6'3, 275); 8 – Roderick Daniels – (redshirt) senior (6'2, 260); 14 – Donovan Westmoreland – (redshirt) sophomore (6'1, 230); 19 – Elijah Harper – junior (6'3, 240); 41 – Byron Jackson – freshman (6'4, 225); 53 – AJ Miller – (redshirt) sophomore (6'3, 280); 55 – Ugonna Nwoha – senior (6'3, 255); 56 – Elijah Hill – freshman (6'2, 240); 58 – Mike Jones – graduate student (6'2, 275); 79 – Marlo East Jr. – sophomore (6'2, 245); 92 – Jackson Cooper – freshman (6'4, 300); 94 – Nicholas Charles – (redshirt) junior (6'3, 230); 95 – Ebenezer Dibula – graduate student (6'3, 275); 96 – Jaiden Grimes – sophomore (6'2, 275); 97 – Adam Watkins – (redshirt) senior (6'0, 300); 99 – Nasir Smith – (redshirt) freshman (6'2, 265); Linebackers: 0 – Donelius Johnson – (redshirt) junior (6'0, 220); 7 – Garland Benyard – (redshirt) senior (6'1, 225); 11 – Jamar Rucks – (redshirt) senior (6'3, 230); 16 – Juandarion Silas – (redshirt) junior (6'1, 215); 18 – Jaden Kelly – graduate student (6'1, 225); 38 – Jaiden Kimble – sophomore (6'0, 195); 39 – Eli Leiataua – senior (5'11, 215); 44 – Baron Hopson – (redshirt) senior (6'1, 215); 46 – Tywon Christopher – (redshirt) freshman (6'0, 205); 47 – Deldrick Franklin – (redshirt) sophomore (6'0, 225); 98 – RJ Taylor – (redshirt) junior (6'3, 225) | Defensive backs: 1 – JeRico Washington Jr. – (redshirt) sophomore (5'10, 175); 2 – Caleb Offord – (redshirt) senior (6'1, 189); 3 – Antonio Stevens – graduate student (6'2, 217); 4 – Alexander Ford – (redshirt) junior (6'0, 196); 9 – Isaac Paul – (redshirt) sophomore (5'11, 170); 10 – Ethan Tookes – (redshirt) sophomore (6'2, 191); 12 – Kody Jones – senior (5'11, 193); 15 – Five Hamilton – (redshirt) sophomore (5'10, 175); 17 – Tay'vion Lawson – freshman (6'2, 187); 20 – Tyler Hallum – (redshirt) senior (5'11, 190); 21 – James Ziglor – (redshirt) senior (6'0, 190); 22 – Devin Ross – sophomore (5'11, 175); 24 – Isaiah Thomas – (redshirt) freshman (6'2, 200); 28 – Kayden Miller – freshman (6'2, 190); 29 – Milon Jones – senior (5'11, 190); 31 – Nacari Johnson – sophomore (6'4, 190); 33 – Jeremiah Solomon – freshman (6'1, 183); Placekickers: 96 – Britton Williams – (redshirt) senior (5'11, 200); Punters: 83 – Matthew Choules – P – freshman (6'3, 225); 89 – Joshua Huiet – P – (redshirt) senior (6'2, 205); Long snapper: 58 – Ben Blanton – sophomore (5'10, 210) |
Source and player details, 2025 Kennesaw State Owls (5/20/2025):

=== Recruiting class ===
College recruiting (2025)
| Name | Hometown | School | Height | Weight | Commit date |
|---|---|---|---|---|---|
| Jayce Cora; ATH | Naples, FL | Community School of Naples | 6 ft 4 in (1.93 m) | 185 lb (84 kg) | |
| Jayce Cora; ATH | Recruit ratings: 247Sports: ESPN: (76) | | | | |
| Byron Jackson; LB | Greensboro, FL | Gadsden County High School | 6 ft 3 in (1.91 m) | 215 lb (98 kg) | |
| Byron Jackson; LB | Recruit ratings: 247Sports: ESPN: (74) | | | | |
| Zamario Woodgett; OL | Smyrna, GA | Campbell High School | 6 ft 5 in (1.96 m) | 280 lb (130 kg) | |
| Zamario Woodgett; OL | Recruit ratings: No ratings found | | | | |
| Jeremiah Solomon; S | Montezuma, GA | Macon County High School | 6 ft 2 in (1.88 m) | 180 lb (82 kg) | |
| Jeremiah Solomon; S | Recruit ratings: No ratings found | | | | |
| Jamiel Williams; OL | Rome, GA | Rome High School | 6 ft 4 in (1.93 m) | 265 lb (120 kg) | |
| Jamiel Williams; OL | Recruit ratings: No ratings found | | | | |
| Joshua Troupe; RB | Richmond Hill, GA | Richmond Hill High School | 5 ft 11 in (1.80 m) | 210 lb (95 kg) | |
| Joshua Troupe; RB | Recruit ratings: No ratings found | | | | |
| Jamari Harrold; TE | Norcross, GA | Norcross High School | 6 ft 4 in (1.93 m) | 212 lb (96 kg) | |
| Jamari Harrold; TE | Recruit ratings: No ratings found | | | | |
| Kayden Miller; S | Lithonia, GA | Lithonia High School | 6 ft 1 in (1.85 m) | 185 lb (84 kg) | |
| Kayden Miller; S | Recruit ratings: No ratings found | | | | |
| Clayton Coppock; WR | Atlanta, GA | Benjamin Elijah Mays High School | 6 ft 0 in (1.83 m) | 160 lb (73 kg) | |
| Clayton Coppock; WR | Recruit ratings: No ratings found | | | | |
| Tay'vion Lawson; S | Jacksonville, FL | Andrew Jackson High School | 6 ft 2 in (1.88 m) | 187 lb (85 kg) | |
| Tay'vion Lawson; S | Recruit ratings: No ratings found | | | | |
| Haston Crawford; OL | Tuscaloosa, AL | Tuscaloosa Academy | 6 ft 6 in (1.98 m) | 300 lb (140 kg) | |
| Haston Crawford; OL | Recruit ratings: No ratings found | | | | |
| Elijah Hill; DE | Bryant, AR | Bryant High School | 6 ft 2 in (1.88 m) | 240 lb (110 kg) | |
| Elijah Hill; DE | Recruit ratings: No ratings found | | | | |
| Skyler Williams; QB | Warner Robins, GA | Warner Robins High School | 6 ft 3 in (1.91 m) | 215 lb (98 kg) | |
| Skyler Williams; QB | Recruit ratings: No ratings found | | | | |
| Jackson Cooper; DL | Bradenton, FL | IMG Academy | 6 ft 4 in (1.93 m) | 300 lb (140 kg) | |
| Jackson Cooper; DL | Recruit ratings: No ratings found | | | | |
Overall recruit ranking: 247Sports: #134
Note: In many cases, Scout, Rivals, 247Sports, On3, and ESPN may conflict in their listings of height and weight.; In these cases, the average was taken. ESPN grades are on a 100-point scale.; Sources: "ESPN commits". ESPN.; "2025 Team Ranking". Rivals.com.; "247Sports commits". 247Sports.

=== Transfers ===
==== Outgoing ====
| Player | Position | Destination |
|---|---|---|
| Jaylan Jarrett | DL | Alabama State |
| Markell Redding | DB | Austin Peay |
| Jaden Robinson | WR | Austin Peay |
| Qua Ashley | RB | Ball State |
| Terrence Curtis | DB | Black Hills State |
| Bryce Dopson | WR | Boston College |
| Nick Sawyer | DB | Charleston Southern |
| Mason Bowers | OL | Charlotte |
| Ramontei Dardy | LB | Eastern Kentucky |
| Jahon Myers | DE | Florida A&M |
| Quintavious Billingsley | DB | Gardner–Webb |
| Joshua Pgouda | LB | Georgia Military |
| Austin White | DB | Lenoir–Rhyne |
| Thomarius Walker | DL | Memphis |
| Ethan Newman | OL | Memphis |
| Jacob Norcross | OL | Memphis |
| Jayven Williams | S | Mississippi State |
| Blake Bohannon | WR | Montana |
| Jose Balver-Mendoza | OL | Montana |
| Earl Woods III | QB | Norfolk State |
| DJ Scott | RB | North Dakota State |
| Jacob Ulrich | P | Oklahoma |
| Carson Kent | TE | Oklahoma |
| Austin Welch | K | Oklahoma |
| CJ Donaldson | LB | Peru State |
| Braden Bohannon | QB | Reinhardt |
| Connor Finer | TE | Rhode Island |
| Lucas Scheerhorn | QB | Rice |
| Kaleb May | OL | Samford |
| Tyler Hoffman | DL | Shorter |
| Jaiden Kimble | LB | South Carolina State |
| Khalib Johnson | QB | Texas Southern |
| Tyler Scott | DL | UTEP |
| Andrew Douglas | DB | Valdosta State |
| Gatlin Hancock | TE | Valdosta State |
| Dylan Hannon | OL | Valdosta State |
| Bryce Robinson | LS | Virginia |
| Ty Brewer | TE | West Georgia |
| Jarvis Adams | OL | Western Carolina |
| Lawson Weddington | S | Unknown |
| David Cole | WR | Unknown |
| Eli Leiataua | LB | Unknown |
| Danarius Johnson | DB | Unknown |
| Kenai Grier | RB | Unknown |
| Amir Scarver | LB | Unknown |
| Trey Hargrove | LB | Unknown |
| Jasec Smith | DB | Unknown |
| Dennis Sims | WR | Unknown |
| Sulaiman Bah | DB | Unknown |
| Jaxon Colvin | DL | Unknown |
| Erik Calvillo | K | Unknown |
| Nehemiah Pgouda | LB | Unknown |
| William Johnson | OL | Unknown |
| Trey Butts | OL | Unknown |
| Kevin Smith | OL | Unknown |
| Ian Pederson | TE | Unknown |
| Garland Benyard | LB | Withdrawn |
| Gabriel Benyard | WR | Withdrawn |
| Five Hamilton | DB | Withdrawn |
| JeRico Washington Jr. | DB | Withdrawn |
| Adam Watkins | DL | Withdrawn |
| Jamar Rucks | DL | Withdrawn |
| Destun Thomas | WR | Withdrawn |

==== Incoming ====
| Player | Position | Previous school |
|---|---|---|
| Cameron Williams | OL | Alabama A&M |
| Caleb Offord | DB | Alabama State |
| Ethan Tookes | DB | Alabama State |
| Rene Miller | OL | Alcorn State |
| Elijah Zollicoffer | OL | Arkansas State |
| Ebenezer Dibula | DL | Bethune–Cookman |
| Casey Jean-Baptiste | OL | Coffeyville CC |
| Elijah Harper | DL | Emory and Henry |
| Jadarious Lee | OL | FIU |
| Chase Stevens | OL | Florida |
| Chrisdasson Saint-Jean | OL | Florida Atlantic |
| Lyndon Ravare | WR | Fresno State |
| Dexter Williams II | QB | Georgia Southern |
| Nasir Smith | DL | Georgia Southern |
| Brandon Best | OL | Georgia Tech |
| Josiah Chenault | OL | Howard |
| Tommy Ulatowski | QB | Kent State |
| Rod Daniels | DL | Liberty |
| Kody Jones | DB | Memphis |
| Isaiah Thomas | DB | Miami (FL) |
| Semaj Parker | TE | Mississippi State |
| Matthew Choules | P | Marist College Canberra |
| Jaden Kelly | LB | Norfolk State |
| Antonio Stevens | DB | Purdue |
| Coleman Bennett | RB | Rice |
| Brylan Noonan | LS | Temple |
| Gerard Bullock | TE | Tennessee State |
| Nacari Johnson | DB | UAB |
| Jack Bernstein | LS | UCF |
| Nikola Milovac | OL | USF |
| Mike Jones | DL | Virginia Union |
| Chase Belcher | RB | West Georgia |
| Jordan Jackson | WR | West Georgia |
| Alexander Ford | DB | Western Kentucky |
| Marcus Patterson | DE | Western Kentucky |
| Amari Odom | QB | Wofford |

=== Coaching staff additions ===
| Name | New position | Previous team | Previous position | Source |
|---|---|---|---|---|
| Jerry Mack | Head coach | Jacksonville Jaguars | Running backs | |
| Mitch Militello | Offensive coordinator/Quarterbacks | Tennessee | Offensive analyst | |
| Kyle Blocker | Special teams / Tight ends | Miami (OH) | Special teams | |
| David Whitlow | Wide receivers | West Georgia | Wide receivers | |
| Aston Walter | Running backs | Tennessee | Offensive assistant | |
| Granville Eastman | Safeties | Rice | Offensive recruiting coordinator | |
| Marc Mattioli | Defensive coordinator | Paris Musketeers | Head coach | |
| Jonathan Bradley | Defensive line | South Alabama | Defensive line | |
| James Williams | Cornerbacks | Alabama State | Cornerbacks | |
| William Paruta | Linebackers | Mississippi College | Defensive coordinator/Linebackers | |
| Jay Clements | Offensive line | Mississippi State | Offensive line analyst | |

=== Coaching staff departures ===
| Name | Position | New team | New position | Source |
|---|---|---|---|---|
| Brian Bohannon | Head coach | Georgia Tech | Senior offensive assistant | |
| Chandler Burks | Co-offensive coordinator | Army | Tight ends | |
| Greg Harris | Defensive coordinator | Valdosta State | Defensive coordinator/Assistant head coach | |
| Ray Smith | Defensive backs/Corners | Ball State | Defensive pass game coordinator/Cornerbacks | |
| Jireh Wilson | Defensive backs/Safeties | Virginia Tech | Edges | |
