= 2025 Conference USA Football Championship Game =

- Conference Championship
Kennesaw State Owls	Jacksonville State Gamecocks
(9–3)	(8–4)
19	15
Head coach: Jerry Mack	Head coach: Charles Kelly
	1	2	3	4	Total
Kennesaw State	0	7	3	9	19
Jacksonville State	0	0	0	15	15
- Date: December 5, 2025
- Season: 2025
- Stadium: AmFirst Stadium
- Location: Jacksonville, Alabama
- MVP: Amari Odom (QB, Kennesaw State)
- Referee: Ron Hudson
- Attendance: 18,142

United States TV coverage
- Network: CBSSN
- Announcers: Rich Waltz (play by play), Robert Turbin (analyst), and Jordan Giorgio (sideline reporter)

2025 Conference USA football standings
	Conf.			Overall
Team	W		L	W		L
Kennesaw State y$	7	–	1	10	–	4
Jacksonville State y	7	–	1	9	–	5
Western Kentucky	6	–	2	9	–	4
Louisiana Tech	5	–	3	8	–	5
FIU	5	–	3	7	–	6
Missouri State	5	–	3	7	–	6
Delaware	4	–	4	7	–	6
Liberty	3	–	5	4	–	8
New Mexico State	2	–	6	4	–	8
Middle Tennessee	2	–	6	3	–	9
Sam Houston	1	–	7	2	–	10
UTEP	1	–	7	2	–	10
Championship: Kennesaw State 19, Jacksonville State 15
$ – Conference champion; y – Championship game participant

The 2025 Conference USA Football Championship Game was a college football game played on December 5, 2025, to determine the champion of Conference USA (CUSA) for the 2025 season. It was the 21st Conference USA Football Championship Game. The game started at 6:00 p.m. CST and aired on CBS Sports Network. The game featured the Kennesaw State Owls against the Jacksonville State Gamecocks.

== Teams ==
The game was a rematch of a regular season game on November 15. Jacksonville State defeated Kennesaw State, 35–26.

=== Kennesaw State Owls ===
The Owls entered the game with a 9–3 record, 7–1 in conference play. They made their first overall Conference USA title game appearance. 2025 was their first year of eligibility to play in the Conference USA championship game.

=== Jacksonville State Gamecocks ===
The Gamecocks entered the game with an 8–4 record, 7–1 in conference play. They made their second consecutive and overall Conference USA title game appearance. The Gamecocks were 1–0 in previous appearances, having won their only appearance in the title game the season prior.

== Scoring summary ==
2025 Conference USA Football Championship Game
Kennesaw State Owls (9–3) vs. Jacksonville State Gamecocks (8–4)

Quarter	1	2	3	4	Total
Owls	0	7	3	9	19
Gamecocks	0	0	0	15	15

at Burgess–Snow Field at AmFirst Stadium • Jacksonville, Alabama

- Date: December 5, 2025
- Game time: 6:00 p.m. CST
- Game weather: TBD
- Game attendance: 18,142
- Referee: Ron Hudson
- TV announcers (CBS Sports Network): Rich Waltz (play by play), Robert Turbin (analyst), and Jordan Giorgio (sideline reporter)

Game information

First quarter

No scoring plays

Second quarter

- (13:03) KENN – Coleman Bennett 3-yard run, Britton Williams kick (Drive: 11 plays, 80 yards, 4:33; Kennesaw State 7–0)

Third quarter

- (9:57) KENN – Britton Williams 38-yard field goal (Drive: 11 plays, 55 yards, 5:03; Kennesaw State 10–0)

Fourth quarter

- (12:33) KENN – Cam Cook tackled in the end zone for a safety (Drive: 1 plays, -1 yards, 0:07; Kennesaw State 12–0)
- (10:20) JVST – Cam Cook 1 yard run, Garrison Rippa kick (Drive: 7 plays, 48 yards, 2:04; Kennesaw State 12–7)
- (4:04) JVST – Caden Creel 19-yard run, (Caden Creel pass to Deondre Johnson) (Drive: 9 plays, 59 yards, 4:16; Jacksonville State 15–12)
- (0:51) KENN – Navelle Dean 11-yard pass from Amari Odom, Britton Williams kick (Drive: 11 plays, 75 yards, 3:13; Kennesaw State 19–15)

=== Statistics ===
Statistics	KENN	JVST
First downs	23	19
Plays–yards	68–318	62–306
Rushes–yards	36–72	40–210
Passing yards	246	96
Passing: comp–att–int	26–32–0	12–22–1
Time of possession	31:21	28:39

Team	Category	Player	Statistics
Kennesaw State	Passing	Amari Odom	26/32, 246 yards, TD
Kennesaw State	Rushing	Coleman Bennett	17 carries, 82 yards, TD
Kennesaw State	Receiving	Christian Moss	5 receptions, 75 yards
Jacksonville State	Passing	Caden Creel	12/21, 96 yards, INT
Jacksonville State	Rushing	Caden Creel	18 carries, 112 yards, TD
Jacksonville State	Receiving	Deondre Johnson	4 receptions, 59 yards
