= Conference USA Football Championship Game =

American football game

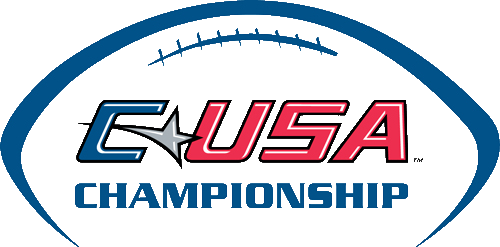
- Sport: College football
- Conference: Conference USA
- Current stadium: Hosted at school site by team with best conference winning percentage
- Played: 2005–present
- Last contest: 2025
- Current champion: Kennesaw State
- Most championships: East Carolina, Florida Atlantic, Tulsa, UAB, UCF, UTSA, Western Kentucky (2)
- TV partner: CBSSN
- Official website: ConferenceUSA.com

Sponsors
- Xbox 360 (2005); Aéropostale (2006); HotelPlanner.com (2010); Dynacraft BSC (2016–2017); Globe Life (2018); Ryan LLC (2019–2022)

The Conference USA Football Championship Game is an annual American football game that has determined the season champion of Conference USA (CUSA) since 2005.

== History ==
The championship game from 2005 to 2021 showcased the CUSA East Division regular season champion against the West Division regular season champion. From the 2022 season, the game pits the number one (1) team in the season standings versus the number two (2) team. The game is typically played on the first Saturday of December. The 2018 edition of the game, sponsored by Globe Life, was played on December 1, 2018, and televised by CBSSN. Ryan LLC currently holds sponsorship rights to the game.

Due partly to major conference realignment in the early 2010s and early 2020s, only five of the nine current CUSA members have played in the Conference USA Football Championship Game, with the most recent 2023 edition featuring two schools in their first season in the conference. The only current CUSA members to have won the championship game are Jacksonville State, Liberty, and Western Kentucky. During the era of divisional play, the overall series between both divisions was led 10–8 by the East Division.

The CUSA Football Championship Game had been aired on ESPN or its affiliates since 2005, but since the 2018 edition has aired on CBSSN.

== Results ==
=== Conference USA champions (1996–2004) ===
Before 2005, each member of the conference played in a round-robin scheduling to determine the champion of the conference. In this time period, Southern Miss won the most titles with four. During this time frame, the winner of the CUSA Championship customarily received a berth to play in the Liberty Bowl against a member of the SEC. If two teams tied for the best conference record, co-champions were declared.

Season	Champion(s)	Conference record	Overall record	Bowl result
1996	Houston	4–1	7–5	lost Liberty Bowl
1996	Southern Miss	4–1	8–3	
1997	19 Southern Miss	6–0	9–3	won Liberty Bowl
1998	7 Tulane	6–0	12–0	won Liberty Bowl
1999	14 Southern Miss	6–0	9–3	won Liberty Bowl
2000	Louisville	6–1	9–3	lost Liberty Bowl
2001	17 Louisville	6–1	11–2	won Liberty Bowl
2002	23 TCU	6–2	11–2	won Liberty Bowl
2002	Cincinnati	6–2	7–7	lost New Orleans Bowl
2003	Southern Miss	8–0	9–4	lost Liberty Bowl
2004	6 Louisville	8–0	11–1	won Liberty Bowl

Final rankings from AP Poll shown.

=== Conference USA Championship Game (2005–present) ===
Below are the results from all Conference USA Football Championship Games played. The winning team appears in bold font, on a background of its primary team color. Rankings are from the AP Poll released prior to the game.

Year	West Division		East Division		Site	Attendance	MVP	Network
2005	**Tulsa**	**44**	UCF	27	Citrus Bowl • (Orlando, Florida)	51,978	TE Garrett Mills, Tulsa	ESPN
2006	**Houston**	**34**	Southern Miss	20	Robertson Stadium • (Houston, Texas)	31,818	WR Vincent Marshall, Houston	ESPN2
2007	Tulsa	25	**UCF**	**44**	Bright House Networks Stadium • (Orlando, Florida)	44,128	RB Kevin Smith, UCF	ESPN
2008	Tulsa	24	**East Carolina**	**27**	Skelly Field at H. A. Chapman Stadium • (Tulsa, Oklahoma)	22,740	CB Travis Simmons, East Carolina	ESPN2
2009	18 Houston	32	**East Carolina**	**38**	Dowdy–Ficklen Stadium • (Greenville, North Carolina)	33,048	WR Dwayne Harris, East Carolina	ESPN2
2010	SMU	7	**UCF**	**17**	Bright House Networks Stadium • (Orlando, Florida)	41,045	RB Latavius Murray, UCF	ESPN2
2011	7 Houston	28	24 **Southern Miss**	**49**	Robertson Stadium • (Houston, Texas)	32,413	RB/WR Tracy Lampley, Southern Miss	ABC
2012	**Tulsa**	**33**	UCF	27	Skelly Field at H. A. Chapman Stadium • (Tulsa, Oklahoma)	17,635	RB/PR/KR Trey Watts, Tulsa	ESPN2
2013	**Rice**	**41**	Marshall	24	Rice Stadium • (Houston, Texas)	20,247	RB Luke Turner, Rice	ESPN2
2014	Louisiana Tech	23	**Marshall**	**26**	Joan C. Edwards Stadium • (Huntington, West Virginia)	23,711	K Justin Haig, Marshall	ESPN2
2015	Southern Miss	28	**Western Kentucky**	**45**	Houchens Industries–L. T. Smith Stadium • (Bowling Green, Kentucky)	16,823	QB Brandon Doughty, Western Kentucky	ESPN2
2016	Louisiana Tech	44	**Western Kentucky**	**58**	Houchens Industries–L. T. Smith Stadium • (Bowling Green, Kentucky)	13,213	RB Anthony Wales, Western Kentucky	ESPN
2017	North Texas	17	**Florida Atlantic**	**41**	FAU Stadium • (Boca Raton, Florida)	14,258	WR Kalib Woods, Florida Atlantic	ESPN2
2018	**UAB**	**27**	Middle Tennessee	25	Johnny "Red" Floyd Stadium • (Murfreesboro, Tennessee)	15,806	RB Spencer Brown, UAB	CBSSN
2019	UAB	6	**Florida Atlantic**	**49**	FAU Stadium • (Boca Raton, Florida)	14,387	WR Deangelo Antoine, Florida Atlantic	CBSSN
2020	**UAB**	**22**	Marshall	13	Joan C. Edwards Stadium • (Huntington, West Virginia)	8,324‡	RB Spencer Brown, UAB	CBSSN
2021	**UTSA**	**49**	Western Kentucky	41	Alamodome • (San Antonio, Texas)	41,148	RB Sincere McCormick, UTSA	CBSSN
Year	No. 1 seed		No. 2 seed		Site	Attendance	MVP	Network
2022	23 **UTSA**	**48**	North Texas	27	Alamodome • (San Antonio, Texas)	41,412	QB Frank Harris, UTSA	CBSSN
2023	24 **Liberty**	**49**	New Mexico State	35	Williams Stadium • (Lynchburg, Virginia)	20,077	QB Kaidon Salter, Liberty	CBSSN
2024	**Jacksonville State**	**52**	Western Kentucky	12	Burgess–Snow Field at AmFirst Stadium • (Jacksonville, Alabama)	15,628	QB Tyler Huff, Jacksonville State	CBSSN
2025	Jacksonville State	15	**Kennesaw State**	**19**	Burgess–Snow Field at AmFirst Stadium • (Jacksonville, Alabama)	18,142	QB Amari Odom, Kennesaw State	CBSSN
2026	Liberty		Jacksonville State		Williams Stadium • (Lynchburg, Virginia)			CBSSN

‡ 2020 game attendance limited due to the COVID-19 pandemic.

=== Results by team ===
==== Current members ====
Appearances	School	W	L	Pct	Titles	Runners-up
4	Western Kentucky	2	2	.500	2015, 2016	2021, 2024
3	Jacksonville State	1	1	.500	2024	2025
2	Liberty	1	0	1.000	2023	
1	Kennesaw State	1	0	1.000	2025	
1	Middle Tennessee	0	1	.000		2018
1	New Mexico State	0	1	.000		2023
0	Delaware	0	0			
0	FIU	0	0			
0	Missouri State	0	0			
0	Sam Houston	0	0			

- Delaware, FIU, Missouri State, and Sam Houston have yet to make an appearance in a Conference USA Championship Game.

==== Former members ====
Appearances	School	W	L	Pct	Titles	Runners-up
4	Tulsa	2	2	.500	2005, 2012	2007, 2008
4	UCF	2	2	.500	2007, 2010	2005, 2012
3	UAB	2	1	.666	2018, 2020	2019
3	Houston	1	2	.333	2006	2009, 2011
3	Marshall	1	2	.333	2014	2013, 2020
3	Southern Miss	1	2	.333	2011	2006, 2015
2	East Carolina	2	0	1.000	2008, 2009	
2	Florida Atlantic	2	0	1.000	2017, 2019	
2	UTSA	2	0	1.000	2021, 2022	
2	Louisiana Tech	0	2	.000		2014, 2016
2	North Texas	0	2	.000		2017, 2022
1	Rice	1	0	1.000	2013	
1	SMU	0	1	.000		2010

=== Rematches ===
The Conference USA Football Championship game has featured a rematch of a regular-season game in eleven of the twenty-one times it's been played (2006, 2007, 2012, 2016, 2017, 2018, 2021, 2022, 2023, 2024, 2025). The team which won the regular-season game is 6-5 in the rematches, winning in 2007, 2012, 2017, 2021, 2022, and 2023 but losing in 2006, 2016, 2018, 2024, 2025.

=== No results by team ===
School
Charlotte
Memphis
Old Dominion
Tulane
UTEP

- Charlotte, Memphis, Old Dominion, Tulane, and UTEP did not make an appearance in a Conference USA Championship Game while members of the conference.

=== Game location ===
The team with the best overall conference win percentage will be the team that hosts the championship game. Six venues have hosted two title games—Houston's Robertson Stadium (since demolished, with TDECU Stadium standing at its former site), UCF's Acrisure Bounce House (both under its former name of Bright House Networks Stadium), Tulsa's Chapman Stadium, Western Kentucky's Houchens Stadium, Florida Atlantic's Flagler Credit Union Stadium (historically FAU Stadium), and UTSA's Alamodome. Of these schools, the only one still a CUSA member is Western Kentucky.

In most recent years, Marshall and Rice both finished with 7–1 records in conference play in 2013, and did not play one another in the regular season; the site was chosen based on the BCS rankings at that time on December 1. Although only 25 teams were explicitly ranked, the ranking formula could be used to determine the relative rankings of any two teams in the Football Bowl Subdivision. Since 2014, when the BCS was replaced with the College Football Playoff rankings (CFP), national rankings have been removed from the tiebreaker process.

Following the 2024 contest, the home team is 15–5 overall in CUSA football championship games.

== Game records ==
Team	Record, Team vs. Opponent	Year
Most points scored (one team)	58, Western Kentucky vs. Louisiana Tech	2016
Most points scored (losing team)	44, Louisiana Tech vs. Western Kentucky	2016
Fewest points scored (winning team)	17, UCF vs. SMU	2010
Fewest points scored	6, UAB vs. FAU	2019
Most points scored (both teams)	102, Western Kentucky (58) vs. Louisiana Tech (44)	2016
Fewest points scored (both teams)	24, UCF (17) vs. SMU (7)	2010
Most points scored in a half	38, Western Kentucky (1st half) vs. Louisiana Tech	2016
Most points scored in a half (both teams)	65, Western Kentucky vs. Louisiana Tech (1st half)	2016
Largest margin of victory	43, Florida Atlantic (49) vs. UAB (6)	2019
Smallest margin of victory	2, UAB (27) vs. Middle Tennessee (25)	2018
Total yards	656, Western Kentucky (421 passing, 235 rushing) vs. Louisiana Tech	2016
Rushing yards	386, Jacksonville State vs. Western Kentucky	2024
Passing yards	577, Western Kentucky vs. UTSA	2021
First downs	33, Houston vs. East Carolina	2009
Fewest yards allowed	223, Florida Atlantic vs. UAB (84 passing, 139 rushing)	2019
Fewest rushing yards allowed	−9, Western Kentucky vs. UTSA	2021
Fewest passing yards allowed	72, Marshall vs. Louisiana Tech	2014
Individual	Record, Player, Team vs. Opponent	Year
Total offense	582, Bailey Zappe, Western Kentucky vs. UTSA	2021
Touchdowns responsible for	5, Case Keenum, Houston vs. East Carolina	2009
Rushing yards	284, Kevin Smith, UCF vs. East Carolina	2007
Rushing touchdowns	4, shared by: Kevin Smith, UCF vs. East Carolina; Anthony Wales, Western Kentucky vs. Louisiana Tech	2007; 2016
Passing yards	577, Bailey Zappe, Western Kentucky vs. UTSA	2021
Passing touchdowns	5, Case Keenum, Houston vs. East Carolina	2009
Receiving yards	241, James Cleveland, Houston vs. East Carolina	2009
Receiving touchdowns	3, Zakhari Franklin, UTSA vs. North Texas	2022
Tackles	15, shared by: Gerald McRath, Southern Miss vs. Houston; C.J. Cavness, Houston vs. East Carolina	2006; 2009
Sacks	2, Bruce Miller, UCF vs. SMU	2010
Interceptions	2, shared by 4 players, most recent: Jaylen Young, Florida Atlantic vs. North Texas	2017
Long Plays	Record, Player, Team vs. Opponent	Year
Touchdown run	74, Kevin Smith, UCF vs. Tulsa	2007
Touchdown pass	75, Deangelo Antoine from Chris Robison, Florida Atlantic vs. UAB	2019
Kickoff return	69, Dwayne Harris, East Carolina vs. Houston	2009
Punt return	83, Joe Burnett, UCF vs. Tulsa	2007
Interception return	72, Travis Simmons, East Carolina vs. Tulsa	2008
Fumble return	40, Travis Simmons, East Carolina vs. Tulsa	2008
Punt	73, Matt Dodge, East Carolina vs. Tulsa	2008
Field goal	54, Lucas Carneiro, Western Kentucky vs. Jacksonville State	2024
Miscellaneous	Record, Team vs. Team	Year
Game attendance	51,978, UCF vs. Tulsa	2005
Source: Conference USA

== Selection criteria ==
Division standings are based on each team's overall conference record. Often, two or more teams tie for the best record in their division and each team is recognized as a divisional co-champion. However, tiebreakers are used to determine who will represent the division in the championship game.

== See also ==
- List of NCAA Division I FBS conference championship games
