= Amari Odom =

American football player

No. 12 – Syracuse Orange
- Position: Quarterback
- Class: Redshirt Junior

Personal information
- Listed height: 6 ft 4 in (1.93 m)
- Listed weight: 205 lb (93 kg)

Career information
- High school: Panther Creek (Cary, North Carolina)
- College: Wofford (2023–2024); Kennesaw State (2025); Syracuse (2026–present)

Awards and highlights
- First-team All-CUSA (2025)
- Stats at ESPN

Amari Odom is an American college football quarterback for the Syracuse Orange. He previously played for the Wofford Terriers and Kennesaw State Owls.

== Early life ==
Odom attended Panther Creek High School in Cary, North Carolina. As a sophomore, he threw for 2,087 yards and 24 touchdowns. As a junior, Odom recorded 3,729 passing yards with 40 touchdowns, before missing his senior season with an anterior cruciate ligament injury. Following his high school career, he committed to play college football at Wofford College.

== College career ==
After playing sparingly and redshirting in 2023, Odom threw for 1,565 yards, seven touchdowns, and six interceptions in 2024 before transferring to Kennesaw State University to play for the Kennesaw State Owls. He made his debut for the Owls against Indiana, completing ten passes for 176 yards and an interception. Throughout the 2025 season, Odom competed with Dexter Williams II for the team's starting quarterback position with Odom eventually winning the job. Against Missouri State, he threw for 387 yards and accounted for six total touchdowns, leading the team to a 41–34 victory and being named the Davey O’Brien National Quarterback of the Week. In the 2025 Conference USA Championship Game against Jacksonville State, Odom completed 26 passes for 246 yards and the game-winning touchdown in a 19–15 win, being named the game's MVP. He finished the season throwing for 2,594 yards and 19 touchdowns, while also rushing for 347 yards and seven touchdowns, before entering the transfer portal for the second time.

On January 10, 2026, Odom announced his decision to transfer to Syracuse University to play for the Syracuse Orange.

=== Statistics ===
Year	Team	Games			Passing								Rushing			
Year	Team	GP	GS	Record	Cmp	Att	Pct	Yds	Y/A	TD	Int	Rtg	Att	Yds	Avg	TD
2023	Wofford	1	1	1–0	9	18	50.0	92	5.1	0	1	81.8	7	-21	-3.0	0
2024	Wofford	8	8	4–4	117	211	55.5	1,565	7.4	7	6	123.0	44	-41	-0.9	0
2025	Kennesaw State	12	10	8–2	189	291	64.9	2,594	8.9	19	8	155.9	120	347	2.9	7
2026	Syracuse	3	1	1–0	37	48	77.1	398	8.3	6	2	179.7	9	2	0.2	1
FCS career		9	9	5−4	126	229	55.0	1,657	7.2	7	7	119.8	51	-62	-1.2	0
FBS career		15	11	9−2	226	339	66.7	2,992	8.8	25	10	159.2	129	349	2.7	8

== Personal life ==
Odom is the son of DeWayne Odom and Trisha Stafford-Odom.
