= Coleman Bennett =

American football player (born 2002)

Profile
- Position: Running back

Personal information
- Born: October 3, 2002 (age 24)
- Listed height: 5 ft 11 in (1.80 m)
- Listed weight: 203 lb (92 kg)

Career information
- High school: Cardinal Gibbons (Fort Lauderdale, Florida)
- College: Bucknell (2021–2023); Rice (2024); Kennesaw State (2025)
- NFL draft: 2026: undrafted

Career history
- Chicago Bears (2026)*; Miami Dolphins (2026)*
- * Offseason or practice squad member only

Awards and highlights
- First-team All-Patriot League (2023)

Coleman Bennett (born October 3, 2002) is an American professional football running back. He played college football at Bucknell from 2021 to 2023, at Rice in 2024, and at Kennesaw State in 2025. Bennett signed with the Chicago Bears after going undrafted in the 2026 NFL draft.

== Early life ==
Coleman Bennett was born on October 3, 2002, the third of four sons in his family. His father, Donnell Bennett, played as a fullback in the NFL for eight years.

== High school career ==
Bennett attended Cardinal Gibbons High School in Fort Lauderdale, Florida. He converted from a wide receiver to tailback for his sophomore season. Bennett later became the captain and helped lead the school to a state championship in 2018, the first in its history.

== College career ==
In Bennett's freshman season with Bucknell, which took place in spring 2021 and was shortened due to the COVID-19 pandemic in Pennsylvania, he led the team with 226 kickoff return yards in 10 attempts, and had a team-leading 35 rushing attempts for 97 rushing yards. The effort led to him being selected for the 2021 Preseason All-Patriot League Football Team as a return specialist. He earned first-team All-Patriot League honors as a return specialist and second-team honors as a running back following the 2023 season.

During his redshirt senior season, sportswriter Stan Awtrey of The Atlanta Journal-Constitution described Bennett as the "most consistent running back" for the Owls. Bennett was the team's leading rusher, totaling 764 yards in 157 attempts with four rushing touchdowns. He also totaled 27 receptions for 314 yards and an additional three receiving touchdowns. Bennett competed in the Hula Bowl all-star game following his senior season. In the leadup to the 2026 NFL draft, David Furones of the Sun Sentinel described Bennett as "(having) a shot at hearing his name called in the late rounds."

== Professional career ==
Pre-draft measurables
| Height | Weight | Arm length | Hand span | Wingspan | 40-yard dash | 10-yard split | 20-yard split | 20-yard shuttle | Three-cone drill | Vertical jump | Broad jump | Bench press |
|---|---|---|---|---|---|---|---|---|---|---|---|---|
| 5 ft 11 1/8 in (1.81 m) | 203 lb (92 kg) | 31 1/8 in (0.79 m) | 9 1/4 in (0.23 m) | 6 ft 3 in (1.91 m) | 4.68 s | 1.61 s | 2.76 s | 4.25 s | 7.06 s | 31.5 in (0.80 m) | 10 ft 4 in (3.15 m) | 17 reps |
All values from Pro Day

=== Chicago Bears ===
After going undrafted during the 2026 NFL draft, Bennett signed with the Chicago Bears as an undrafted free agent. He was waived by the Bears on August 17.

=== Miami Dolphins ===
On August 26, 2026, Bennett signed with the Miami Dolphins. He was waived by the Dolphins on August 29.

== Personal life ==
Bennett graduated from Bucknell in three years. He earned a master's degree from Kennesaw State in public administration and graduated from there with a 4.0 grade point average.
