= Jakari Foster =

American football player (born 2003)

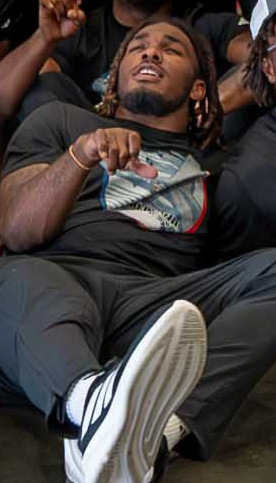
- Foster in 2025

Louisiana Tech Bulldogs
- Title: Assistant safeties coach

Personal information
- Born: April 1, 2003 (age 23)
- Listed height: 6 ft 0 in (1.83 m)
- Listed weight: 200 lb (91 kg)

Career information
- High school: Piedmont (Piedmont, Alabama)
- College: North Alabama (2021); Hutchinson CC (2022–2023); Louisiana Tech (2024–2025)
- NFL draft: 2026: undrafted

Career history
- 2026–present: Louisiana Tech (asst. Safeties)

Awards and highlights
- First-team All-American (2025); Second-team All-CUSA (2025)
- Stats at ESPN

Jakari Elijah Armon Foster (born April 1, 2003) is an American football coach and former player. He is currently the assistant safeties coach for Louisiana Tech. He previously played at North Alabama, Hutchinson CC, and Louisiana Tech.

== Early life ==
Foster played high school football at Piedmont High School. He played as both a defensive back and wide receiver and earned first-team all-state honors at defensive back in 2019 and 2020. During the 2019 3A title game, Foster caught the game-winning touchdown pass in Piedmont's victory over Mobile Christian.

Foster committed to play college football at the University of North Alabama.

== College career ==
As a freshman, Foster appeared in three games, earning a redshirt. After the season, he transferred to Hutchinson Community College. At Hutchinson, Foster appeared in 11 games over two seasons and amassed 29 total tackles, a forced fumble and one interception and four pass breakups. After the 2023 season, he transferred to Louisiana Tech. During his first season with the Bulldogs, Foster played in all 13 games and recorded 33 tackles, one interception, and a forced fumble. He had a career high 11 tackles in the game against UTEP. In 2025, Foster significantly increased his production, leading the FBS with 8 interceptions. He also notched 4 pass deflections, 58 tackles, and a fumble recovery over 13 games.

On December 4, 2025, Foster declared for the 2026 NFL draft.

=== College statistics ===
Legend
	Led NCAA Division I FBS
**Bold**	Career high

Season	Team	GP	Tackles					Interceptions					Fumbles		
Season	Team	GP	Solo	Ast	Cmb	TfL	Sck	Int	Yds	Avg	TD	PD	FF	FR	TD
2021	North Alabama	3	0	1	1	0.0	0.0	0	0	0.0	0	0	0	0	0
2022	Hutchinson CC	6	1	3	4	0.0	0.0	0	0	0.0	0	1	0	0	0
2023	Hutchinson CC	5	15	10	25	0.0	0.0	1	0	0.0	0	3	**1**	0	0
2024	Louisiana Tech	**13**	18	15	33	0.0	0.0	1	0	0.0	0	1	**1**	0	0
2025	Louisiana Tech	**13**	**26**	**32**	**58**	**1.5**	0.0	**8**	**67**	**8.4**	**1**	**4**	**1**	0	0
Career		40	60	61	121	1.5	0.0	10	67	6.7	1	9	3	0	0

== Professional career ==
Pre-draft measurables
Height	Weight	Arm length	Hand span	Wingspan	40-yard dash	10-yard split	20-yard split	20-yard shuttle	Three-cone drill	Vertical jump	Broad jump	Bench press
5 ft 11 in (1.80 m)	206 lb (93 kg)	31 in (0.79 m)	9 in (0.23 m)	6 ft 2 7/8 in (1.90 m)	4.66 s	1.66 s	2.76 s	4.43 s	7.62 s	33.5 in (0.85 m)	9 ft 0 in (2.74 m)	18 reps
All values from Pro Day

Foster went undrafted during the 2026 NFL draft, but received an invitation to the Tennessee Titans and New Orleans Saints rookie minicamps.

== Coaching career ==
After not signing a contract with an NFL or CFL team, Foster contacted Luke Olson, Louisiana Tech's defensive coordinator, and asked if there was an opportunity for him to coach for the Bulldogs. Foster joined Louisiana Tech as an assistant safeties coach in August 2026.

== Personal life ==
Foster is the son of Shalonda Monique Stitts and Mayeis Nytcanga Foster.

Foster is an avid golfer.
