= 2025 UTEP Miners football team =

American college football season

2025 UTEP Miners football
- Conference: Conference USA
- Record: 2–10 (1–7 CUSA)
- Head coach: Scotty Walden (2nd season)
- Offensive coordinator: Mark Cala (1st season)
- Co-offensive coordinator: Ryan Stanchek (2nd season)
- Offensive scheme: Spread
- Defensive coordinator: Bobby Daly (1st season)
- Co-defensive coordinator: Kelvin Sigler (2nd season)
- Base defense: 4–2–5
- Home stadium: Sun Bowl

2025 Conference USA football standings
	Conf.			Overall
Team	W		L	W		L
Kennesaw State y$	7	–	1	10	–	4
Jacksonville State y	7	–	1	9	–	5
Western Kentucky	6	–	2	9	–	4
Louisiana Tech	5	–	3	8	–	5
FIU	5	–	3	7	–	6
Missouri State	5	–	3	7	–	6
Delaware	4	–	4	7	–	6
Liberty	3	–	5	4	–	8
New Mexico State	2	–	6	4	–	8
Middle Tennessee	2	–	6	3	–	9
Sam Houston	1	–	7	2	–	10
UTEP	1	–	7	2	–	10
Championship: Kennesaw State 19, Jacksonville State 15
$ – Conference champion; y – Championship game participant

The 2025 UTEP Miners football team represented the University of Texas at El Paso (UTEP) as a member of Conference USA (CUSA) during the 2025 NCAA Division I FBS football season. The Miners were led by second-year head coach Scotty Walden and played home games at the Sun Bowl in El Paso, Texas.

The 2025 season was the program's last season as a member of CUSA. The Miners joined the Mountain West Conference (MW) in the 2026–27 academic year.

== Schedule ==
Date	Time	Opponent	Site	TV	Result	Attendance
August 30	5:30 p.m.	at Utah State*	Maverik Stadium; Logan, UT	CBSSN	L 16–28	16,448
September 6	7:00 p.m.	UT Martin*	Sun Bowl; El Paso, TX	ESPN+	W 42–17	31,122
September 13	2:15 p.m.	at No. 7 Texas*	Darrell K Royal–Texas Memorial Stadium; Austin, TX	SECN	L 10–27	102,025
September 20	7:00 p.m.	Louisiana–Monroe*	Sun Bowl; El Paso, TX	ESPN+	L 25–31	15,272
September 27	7:00 p.m.	Louisiana Tech^{†}	Sun Bowl; El Paso, TX	ESPN+	L 11–30	13,013
October 8	6:00 p.m.	Liberty	Sun Bowl; El Paso, TX	CBSSN	L 8–19	9,286
October 15	5:00 p.m.	at Sam Houston	Shell Energy Stadium; Houston, TX	CBSSN	W 35–17	4,657
October 28	6:00 p.m.	at Kennesaw State	Fifth Third Stadium; Kennesaw, GA	ESPNU	L 20–33	11,040
November 8	1:00 p.m.	Jacksonville State	Sun Bowl; El Paso, TX	ESPN+	L 27–30	9,536
November 15	1:00 p.m.	at Missouri State	Robert W. Plaster Stadium; Springfield, MO	ESPN+	L 24–38	13,298
November 22	1:00 p.m.	New Mexico State	Sun Bowl; El Paso, TX (Battle of I-10)	ESPN+	L 31–34	16,677
November 29	11:00 a.m.	at Delaware	Delaware Stadium; Newark, DE	ESPN+	L 31–61	13,560
*Non-conference game; ^{†}Homecoming; Rankings from AP Poll - Released prior to game; All times are in Mountain time

== Game summaries ==
=== at Utah State ===
Game One – UTEP Miners (0–0) at Utah State Aggies (0–0) – Game summary

Quarter	1	2	3	4	Total
Miners	7	3	0	6	16
Aggies	10	10	8	0	28

at Maverik Stadium • Logan, UT

- Date: Saturday August 30, 2025
- Game time: 5:30 PM
- Game attendance: 16,448
- Referee: Patrick Foy
- TV announcers (CBSSN): Fran Charles (play-by-play), Taylor McHargue (analyst), and Hailey Sutton (sideline reporter)

Game information

First quarter

- USU – Tanner Rinker 49-yard field goal, 9:48. Aggies 3–0. Drive: 11 plays, 49 yards, 5:09.
- UTEP – Kenny Odom 34-yard pass from Malachi Nelson (Carlos Arrelola kick), 4:30. Miners 7–3. Drive: 4 plays, 61 yards, 1:08.
- USU – Miles Davis 58-yard run (Tanner Rinker kick), 0:18. Aggies 10–7. Drive: 1 play, 58 yards, 0:12.

Second quarter

- USU – Tanner Rinker 28-yard field goal, 8:36. Aggies 13–7. Drive: 12 plays, 62 yards, 4:52.
- USU – Broc Lane 52-yard pass from Bryson Barnes (Tanner Rinker kick), 1:56. Aggies 20–7. Drive: 5 plays, 80 yards, 1:43.
- UTEP – Carlos Arrelola 42-yard field goal, 0:02. Aggies 20–10. Drive: 11 plays, 56 yards, 1:49.

Third quarter

- USU – Bryson Barnes 12-yard run (Anthony Garcia run), 8:35. Aggies 28–10. Drive: 7 plays, 93 yards, 2:37.

Fourth quarter

- UTEP – Ashten Emery 2-yard run (pass failed), 13:48. Aggies 28–16. Drive: 9 plays, 69 yards, 2:29.

Statistics	UTEP	USU
First downs	19	18
Plays–yards	71–284	61–360
Rushes–yards	35–103	33–127
Passing yards	181	233
Passing: Comp–Att–Int	23–36–1	19–28–0
Turnovers	1	0
Time of possession	29:23	30:37

Team	Category	Player	Statistics
UTEP	Passing	Malachi Nelson	22/34, 178 yards, TD, INT
UTEP	Rushing	Kam Thomas	16 carries, 36 yards
UTEP	Receiving	Kenny Odom	9 receptions, 97 yards, TD
Utah State	Passing	Bryson Barnes	19/28, 233 yards, TD
Utah State	Rushing	Miles Davis	12 carries, 88 yards, TD
Utah State	Receiving	Miles Davis	6 receptions, 61 yards

=== vs. UT Martin (FCS) ===
Game Two – UT Martin Skyhawks (FCS) (0–1) at UTEP Miners (0–1) – Game summary

Quarter	1	2	3	4	Total
Skyhawks (FCS)	0	7	3	7	17
Miners	7	21	14	0	42

at Sun Bowl • El Paso, TX

- Date: Saturday September 6, 2025
- Game time: 7:00 PM
- Game weather: Cloudy • Temperature: 79 °F (26 °C)
- Game attendance: 31,122
- Referee: Reed Brotherton
- TV announcers (ESPN+): Andy Morgan (play-by-play) and Ed Stansbury (analyst)
- Box Score, Recap

Game information

First quarter

- UTEP – Ashten Emery 2-yard run (Carlos Arreola kick), 11:34. Miners 7–0. Drive: 4 plays, 25 yards, 0:50.

Second quarter

- UTM – Bryce Bailey 11-yard run (Cade Hechter kick), 14:48. Tied 7–7. Drive: 5 plays, 33 yards, 2:02.
- UTEP – Toric Goins Jr. 48-yard pass from Malachi Nelson (Carlos Arreola kick), 12:27. Miners 14–7. Drive: 6 plays, 76 yards, 2:07.
- UTEP – Ashten Emery 8-yard pass from Malachi Nelson (Cade McConnell run), 8:02. Miners 22–7. Drive: 6 plays, 76 yards, 2:35.
- UTEP – Hahsaun Wilson 94-yard run (Carlos Arreola kick BLOCKED), 5:00. Miners 28–7. Drive: 2 plays, 96 yards, 0:35.

Third quarter

- UTM – Cade Hechter 21-yard field goal, 7:21. Miners 28–10. Drive: 13 plays, 68 yards, 6:14.
- UTEP – Kenny Odom 74-yard pass from Malachi Nelson (Carlos Arreola kick), 6:25. Miners 35–10. Drive: 2 plays, 70 yards, 0:48.
- UTEP – Ashten Emergy 12-yard pass from Malachi Nelson (Carlos Arreola kick), 3:11. Miners 42–10. Drive: 4 plays, 34 yards, 1:15.

Fourth quarter

- UTM – Phaizon Wilson 20-yard pass from Jase Bauer (Cade Hechter kick), 12:07. Miners 42–17. Drive: 12 plays, 79 yards, 5:58.

Statistics	UTM	UTEP
First downs	19	14
Plays–yards	76–371	54–472
Rushes–yards	40–76	25–194
Passing yards	295	278
Passing: Comp–Att–Int	24–36–0	15–29–0
Turnovers	1	1
Time of possession	38:48	21:12

Team	Category	Player	Statistics
UT Martin	Passing	Jase Bauer	23/33, 273 yards, TD
UT Martin	Rushing	John Gentry	12 carries, 32 yards
UT Martin	Receiving	Bryce Bailey	4 receptions, 92 yards
UTEP	Passing	Malachi Nelson	14/26, 278 yards, 4 TD
UTEP	Rushing	Hahsaun Wilson	8 carries, 117 yards, TD
UTEP	Receiving	Kenny Odom	5 receptions, 124 yards, TD

=== at No. 7 Texas ===
Game Three – UTEP Miners (1–1) at No. 7 Texas Longhorns (1–1) – Game summary

Quarter	1	2	3	4	Total
Miners	0	3	0	7	10
No. 7 Longhorns	7	7	6	7	27

at Darrell K Royal–Texas Memorial Stadium • Austin, TX

- Date: Saturday September 13, 2025
- Game time: 2:15 PM
- Game weather: Sunny • Temperature: 93 °F (34 °C)
- Game attendance: 102,205
- Referee: Lee Hedrick
- TV announcers (SECN+/ESPN+): Dave Neal (play-by-play), Fozzy Whittaker (analyst), and Morgan Uber (sideline reporter)

Game information

First quarter

- (5:26) TEX – Arch Manning 2-yard run (Mason Shipley kick), (Drive: 9 plays, 53 yards, 4:56; Texas 7–0)

Second quarter

- (1:55) UTEP – Carlos Arreola 39-yard field goal (Drive: 7 plays, 66 yards, 2:10; Texas 7–3)
- (0:01) TEX – Arch Manning 5-yard run (Mason Shipley kick), (Drive: 7 plays, 40 yards, 0:53; Texas 14–3)

Third quarter

- (7:50) TEX – Mason Shipley 31-yard field goal (Drive: 9 plays, 25 yards, 4:55; Texas 17–3)
- (1:41) TEX – Mason Shipley 30-yard field goal (Drive: 10 plays, 37 yards, 5:00; Texas 20–3)

Fourth quarter

- (10:52) TEX – Ryan Wingo 4-yard pass from Arch Manning (Mason Shipley kick), (Drive: 8 plays, 47 yards, 3:40; Texas 27–3)
- (1:57) UTEP – Shay Smith 2-yard run (Carlos Arreolay kick), (Drive: 7 plays, 87 yards, 2:56; Texas 27–10)

Statistics	UTEP	TEX
First downs	13	23
Plays–yards	59–259	81–340
Rushes–yards	23–50	56–226
Passing yards	209	114
Passing: comp–att–int	24–36–2	11–25–1
Turnovers	2	1
Time of possession	23:13	36:47

Team	Category	Player	Statistics
UTEP	Passing	Malachi Nelson	24/36, 209 yards, 2 INT
UTEP	Rushing	Hahsaun Wilson	6 carries, 39 yards
UTEP	Receiving	Trevon Tate	6 receptions, 64 yards
Texas	Passing	Arch Manning	11/25, 114 yards, TD, INT
Texas	Rushing	James Simon	17 carries, 67 yards
Texas	Receiving	Ryan Wingo	3 receptions, 32 yards, TD

=== vs. Louisiana–Monroe ===
Game Four – Louisiana–Monroe Warhawks (1–1) at UTEP Miners (1–2) – Game summary

Quarter	1	2	3	4	Total
Warhawks	14	10	7	0	31
Miners	7	0	3	15	25

at Sun Bowl • El Paso, TX

- Date: Saturday September 20, 2025
- Game time: 7:00 p.m.
- Game weather: Sunny • Temperature: 82 °F (28 °C) • Wind: SE 5 mph
- Game attendance: 15,272
- Referee: Scott Hardin
- TV announcers (ESPN+): Andy Morgan (play-by-play) and Ed Stansbury (analyst)

Game information

First quarter

- (7:44) ULM – Jake Godfrey 12-yard pass from Aidan Armenta, Luke Stagg kick (Drive: 3 plays, 96 yards, 1:37; Louisiana–Monroe 7–0)
- (7:27) UTEP – Trevon Tate 73-yard pass from Malachi Nelson, Carlos Arreola kick (Drive: 1 play, 73 yards, 0:12; Tied 7–7)
- (2:31) ULM – Braylon McReynolds 40-yard run, Luke Stagg kick (Drive: 2 plays, 77 yards, 0:49; Louisiana–Monroe 14–7)

Second quarter

- (12:42) ULM – Jonathan Bibbs 35-yard pass from Aidan Armenta, Luke Stagg kick (Drive: 6 plays, 74 yards, 3:07; Louisiana–Monroe 21–7)
- (5:40) ULM – Luke Stagg 44-yard field goal (Drive: 10 plays, 49 yards, 5:15; Louisiana–Monroe 24–7)

Third quarter

- (7:53) ULM – Hunter Herring 1-yard run, Luke Stagg kick (Drive: 6 plays, 27 yards, 3:20; Louisiana–Monroe 31–7)
- (5:39) UTEP – Carlos Arreola 27-yard field goal (Drive: 9 plays, 78 yards, 2:09; Louisiana–Monroe 31–10)

Fourth quarter

- (13:31) UTEP – Wondame Davis Jr. 44-yard pass from Malachi Nelson, Hahsaun Wilson two-point conversion pass from Malachi Nelson (Drive: 3 plays, 67 yards, 1:21; Louisiana–Monroe 31–18)
- (6:00) UTEP – Wondame Davis Jr. 20-yard pass from Malachi Nelson, Carlos Arreola kick (Drive: 8 plays, 77 yards, 2:35; Louisiana–Monroe 31–25)

Statistics	ULM	UTEP
First downs	18	21
Plays–yards	57–399	78–442
Rushes–yards	42–250	28–33
Passing yards	149	409
Passing: Comp–Att–Int	9-15-0	23-50-2
Turnovers	0	2
Time of possession	31:51	28:09

Team	Category	Player	Statistics
Louisiana–Monroe	Passing	Aidan Armenta	8/14, 136 yards, 2 TD
Louisiana–Monroe	Rushing	Braylon McReynolds	18 carries, 107 yards, TD
Louisiana–Monroe	Receiving	Jake Godfrey	2 receptions, 49 yards, TD
UTEP	Passing	Malachi Nelson	22/46, 404 yards, 3 TD, 2 INT
UTEP	Rushing	Hahsaun Wilson	10 carries, 21 yards
UTEP	Receiving	Trevon Tate	7 receptions, 133 yards, TD

=== vs. Louisiana Tech ===
Game Five – Louisiana Tech Bulldogs (3–1) at UTEP Miners (1–3) – Game summary

Quarter	1	2	3	4	Total
Bulldogs	7	0	3	20	30
Miners	0	0	0	11	11

at Sun Bowl • El Paso, TX

- Date: Saturday September 27, 2025
- Game time: 7:00 p.m.
- Game weather: Sunny, 80 °F (27 °C)
- Game attendance: 13,013
- Referee: Rory Bernard
- TV announcers (ESPN+): Andy Morgan (play-by-play) and Ed Stansbury (analyst)

Game information

First quarter

- LT – Marques Singleton Jr. 5-yard pass from Blake Baker (Drew Henderson kick), 6:14. Bulldogs 7–0. Drive: 10 plays, 60 yards, 4:24.

Second quarter

- No scoring plays.

Third quarter

- LT – Drew Henderson 37-yard field goal, 5:47. Bulldogs 10–0. Drive: 4 plays, 7 yards, 1:49.

Fourth quarter

- UTEP – Tanner Cragun 38-yard field goal, 14:55. Bulldogs 10–3. Drive: 14 plays, 54 yards, 5:52.
- LT – Jakari Foster 67-yard interception return (Drew Henderson kick), 10:22. Bulldogs 17–3. Drive: 2 plays, 0 yards, 0:08.
- LT – Clay Thevenin 4-yard run (Drew Henderson kick), 4:58. Bulldogs 24–3. Drive: 6 plays, 42 yards, 3:26.
- UTEP – Wondame Davis Jr. 35-yard pass from Skyler Locklear (Josh Schuchts pass), 9:34. Bulldogs 42–14. Drive: 4 plays, 49 yards, 2:06.
- LT – Alonzo Jackson Jr. 23-yard interception return (kick failed), 1:44. Bulldogs 30–11. Drive: 1 play, 0 yards, 0:09.

Statistics	LT	UTEP
First downs	16	15
Plays–yards	68–232	73–272
Rushes–yards	42–95	29–126
Passing yards	137	147
Passing: comp–att–int	18–26–1	22–44–5
Turnovers	4	5
Time of possession	32:15	27:45

Team	Category	Player	Statistics
Louisiana Tech	Passing	Blake Baker	18/26, 137 yards, TD, INT
Louisiana Tech	Rushing	Clay Thevenin	19 carries, 68 yards, TD
Louisiana Tech	Receiving	Marlion Jackson	3 receptions, 44 yards
UTEP	Passing	Skyler Locklear	4/6, 74 yards, TD, INT
UTEP	Rushing	Ashten Emory	11 carries, 50 yards
UTEP	Receiving	Wondame Davis Jr.	2 receptions, 58 yards, TD

=== vs. Liberty ===
Game Six – Liberty Flames (1–4) at UTEP Miners (1–4) – Game summary

Quarter	1	2	3	4	Total
Flames	7	6	6	0	19
Miners	0	0	0	8	8

at Sun Bowl • El Paso, TX

- Date: Wednesday October 8, 2025
- Game time: 6:00 p.m.
- Game weather: Sunny • Temperature: 79 °F (26 °C)
- Game attendance: 9,286
- Referee: Rodney Burnette
- TV announcers (CBSSN): Alex Del Barrio (play-by-play) and Adam Breneman (analyst)

Game information

First quarter

- (6:21) LIB – Ethan Vasko 2-yard run, Jay Billingsley kick (Drive: 12 plays, 94 yards, 6:32; Liberty 7–0)

Second quarter

- (14:53) LIB – Jay Billingsley 27-yard field goal (Drive: 11 plays, 62 yards, 4:23; Liberty 10–0)
- (8:25) LIB – Jay Billingsley 29-yard field goal (Drive: 11 plays, 45 yards, 5:10; Liberty 13–0)

Third quarter

- (11:18) LIB – Jay Billingsley 50-yard field goal (Drive: 9 plays, 43 yards, 3:42; Liberty 16–0)
- (7:27) LIB – Jay Billingsley 41-yard field goal (Drive: 6 plays, 38 yards, 2:42; Liberty 19–0)

Fourth quarter

- (11:39) UTEP – Skyler Locklear 13-yard run, Josh Schuchts pass (Drive: 8 plays, 65 yards, 3:16; Liberty 19–8)

Statistics	LIB	UTEP
First downs	22	9
Plays–yards	83–403	52–167
Rushes–yards	50–160	25–56
Passing yards	243	111
Passing: Comp–Att–Int	19–33–0	13–27–2
Turnovers	0	2
Time of possession	39:57	20:03

Team	Category	Player	Statistics
Liberty	Passing	Ethan Vasko	19/33, 243 yards
Liberty	Rushing	Vaughn Blue	17 carries, 75 yards
Liberty	Receiving	Julian Gray	3 receptions, 63 yards
UTEP	Passing	Skyler Locklear	9/17, 90 yards, 2 INT
UTEP	Rushing	Skyler Locklear	8 carries, 58 yards, TD
UTEP	Receiving	Kenny Odom	3 receptions, 53 yards

=== at Sam Houston ===
Game Seven – UTEP Miners (1–5) at Sam Houston Bearkats (0–6) – Game summary

Quarter	1	2	3	4	Total
Miners	7	7	7	14	35
Bearkats	7	3	7	0	17

at Bowers Stadium • Huntsville, TX

- Date: Wednesday October 15, 2025
- Game time: 5:00 p.m.
- Game weather: Sunny • Temperature: 82 °F (28 °C) • Wind: SE 14 mph
- Game attendance: 4,657
- Referee: Ron Hudson
- TV announcers (CBSSN): Jack Gordon (play-by-play) and Taylor McHargue (analyst)

Game information

First quarter

- (9:25) SHSU – Malik Phillips 20-yard pass from Hunter Watson, Christian Pavon kick (Drive: 8 plays, 99 yards, 3:50; Sam Houston 7–0)
- (2:52) UTEP – Josh Schuchts 4-yard pass from Skyler Locklear, Carlos Arreola kick (Drive: 3 plays, 50 yards, 1:07; Tied 7–7)

Second quarter

- (12:06) UTEP – Skyler Locklear 2-yard run, Carlos Arreola kick (Drive: 9 plays, 86 yards, 3:38; UTEP 14–7)
- (7:27) SHSU – Christian Pavon 26-yard field goal (Drive: 10 plays, 77 yards, 4:32; UTEP 14–10)

Third quarter

- (6:20) UTEP – Skyler Locklear 15-yard run, Carlos Arreola kick (Drive: 10 plays, 67 yards, 3:41; UTEP 21–10)
- (3:03) SHSU – Lonnie Adkism 13-yard pass from Mabrey Mettauer, Christian Pavon kick (Drive: 6 plays, 90 yards, 3:09; UTEP 21–17)

Fourth quarter

- (7:05) UTEP – Kenny Odom 20-yard pass from Skyler Locklear, Carlos Arreola kick (Drive: 8 plays, 91 yards, 3:24; UTEP 28–17)
- (5:54) UTEP – Ashten Emory 34-yard run, Carlos Arreola kick (Drive: 1 play, 34 yards, 0:08; UTEP 35–17)

Statistics	UTEP	SHSU
First downs	19	20
Plays–yards	60–411	76–398
Rushes–yards	34–175	40–159
Passing yards	236	239
Passing: Comp–Att–Int	21–26–1	22–36–0
Turnovers	2	1
Time of possession	24:35	35:25

Team	Category	Player	Statistics
UTEP	Passing	Skyler Locklear	21/26, 236 yards, 2 TD, INT
UTEP	Rushing	Ashten Emory	15 carries, 96 yards, TD
UTEP	Receiving	Wondame Davis Jr.	3 receptions, 79 yards
Sam Houston	Passing	Hunter Watson	13/19, 161 yards, TD
Sam Houston	Rushing	Landan Brown	13 carries, 110 yards
Sam Houston	Receiving	Chris Reed	3 receptions, 51 yards

=== at Kennesaw State ===
Game Eight – UTEP Miners (2–5) at Kennesaw State Owls (5–2) – Game summary

Quarter	1	2	3	4	Total
Miners	0	10	10	0	20
Owls	14	2	7	10	33

at Fifth Third Stadium • Kennesaw, GA

- Date: Tuesday October 28, 2025
- Game time: 6:00 p.m.
- Game attendance: 11,040
- Referee: Douglas Mercer
- TV announcers (ESPNU): Chuckie Kempt (play-by-play) and Darius Walker (analyst)

Game information

First quarter

- KENN – Caleb Offord 23-yard fumble return (Britton Williams kick), 13:16. Owls 7–0.
- KENN – Gabriel Benyard 57-yard punt return (Britton Williams kick), 6:43. Owls 14–0.

Second quarter

- UTEP – Josh Schuchts 41-yard pass from Skyler Locklear (Carlos Arreola kick), 11:16. Owls 14–7. Drive: 7 plays, 86 yards, 3:38.
- UTEP – Tanner Cragun 38-yard field goal, 3:21. Owls 14–10. Drive: 12 plays, 38 yards, 5:55.
- KENN – Team Safety, 1:31. Owls 16–10.

Third quarter

- UTEP – Kenny Odom 27-yard pass from Skyler Locklear (Carlos Arreola kick), 10:45. Miners 17–16. Drive: 8 plays, 78 yards, 4:11.
- UTEP – Tanner Cragun 26-yard field goal, 3:48. Miners 20–16. Drive: 11 plays, 53 yards, 5:20.
- KENN – Amari Odom 5-yard run (Britton Williams kick), 2:24. Owls 23–20. Drive: 4 plays, 73 yards, 1:16.

Fourth quarter

- KENN – Britton Williams 30-yard field goal, 11:32. Owls 26–20. Drive: 8 plays, 33 yards, 4:10.
- KENN – Chase Belcher 1-yard run (Britton Williams kick), 1:10. Owls 33–20. Drive: 11 plays, 70 yards, 5:22.

Statistics	UTEP	KENN
First downs	17	18
Plays–yards	73–295	71–304
Rushes–yards	43–135	39–150
Passing yards	160	154
Passing: Comp–Att–Int	14–30–0	14–32–1
Turnovers	1	1
Time of possession	30:57	29:03

Team	Category	Player	Statistics
UTEP	Passing	Skyler Locklear	14/29, 160 yards, 2 TD
UTEP	Rushing	Skyler Locklear	23 carries, 77 yards
UTEP	Receiving	Kenny Odom	6 receptions, 51 yards, TD
Kennesaw State	Passing	Amari Odom	6/10, 86 yards
Kennesaw State	Rushing	Chase Belcher	24 carries, 113 yards, TD
Kennesaw State	Receiving	Javon Rogers	1 reception, 66 yards

=== vs. Jacksonville State ===
Game Nine – Jacksonville State Gamecocks (5–3) at UTEP Miners (2–6) – Game summary

Quarter	1	2	3	4	Total
Gamecocks	10	10	0	10	30
Miners	7	6	7	7	27

at Sun Bowl • El Paso, TX

- Date: Saturday November 8, 2025
- Game time: 1:00 p.m. MDT
- Game attendance: 9,536
- Referee: Garrett Dickerson
- TV announcers (ESPN+): Andy Morgan (play-by-play) and Ed Stansbury (analyst)

Game information

First quarter

- JVST – Deondre Johnson 77-yard pass from Caden Creel (Garrison Rippa kick), 11:07. Gamecocks 7–0. Drive: 4 plays, 88 yards, 1:29.
- UTEP – Wondame Davis Jr. 75-yard pass from Skyler Locklear (Carlos Arreola kick), 10:56. Tied 7–7. Drive: 1 play, 75 yards, 0:11.
- JVST – Garrison Rippa 30-yard field goal, 0:53. Gamecocks 10–7. Drive: 13 plays, 53 yards, 4:12.

Second quarter

- JVST – Caleb Nix 93-yard interception return (Garrison Rippa kick), 8:12. Gamecocks 17–7.
- UTEP – Skyler Locklear 1-yard run (pass failed), 3:09. Gamecocks 17–13. Drive: 14 plays, 75 yards, 5:03.
- JVST – Garrison Rippa 36-yard field goal, 0:39. Gamecocks 20–13. Drive: 5 plays, 60 yards, 2:30.

Third quarter

- UTEP – Skyler Locklear 10-yard run (Carlos Arreola kick), 6:38. Tied 20–20. Drive: 11 plays, 47 yards, 5:42.

Fourth quarter

- JVST – Cam Cook 1-yard run (Garrison Rippa kick), 10:01. Gamecocks 27–20. Drive: 7 plays, 64 yards, 2:57.
- UTEP – Eric Willis III 19-yard pass from Skyler Locklear (Carlos Arreola kick), 2:15. Tied 27–27. Drive: 5 plays, 74 yards, 1:45.
- JVST – Garrison Rippa 45-yard field goal, 0:53. Gamecocks 30–27. Drive: 6 plays, 46 yards, 1:22.

Statistics	JVST	UTEP
First downs	23	20
Plays–yards	70–456	69–370
Rushes–yards	39–275	37–126
Passing yards	181	244
Passing: Comp–Att–Int	15–31–1	16–32–1
Turnovers	1	1
Time of possession	30:27	29:33

Team	Category	Player	Statistics
Jacksonville State	Passing	Caden Creel	15/31, 181 yards, TD, INT
Jacksonville State	Rushing	Caden Creel	13 carries, 134 yards
Jacksonville State	Receiving	Deondre Johnson	1 reception, 77 yards, TD
UTEP	Passing	Skyler Locklear	16/32, 244 yards, 2 TD, INT
UTEP	Rushing	Skyler Locklear	17 carries, 82 yards, 2 TD
UTEP	Receiving	Wondame Davis Jr.	5 receptions, 166 yards, TD

=== at Missouri State ===
Game Ten – UTEP Miners (2-7) at Missouri State Bears (6–3) – Game summary

Quarter	1	2	3	4	Total
Miners	0	7	17	0	24
Bears	10	14	0	14	38

at Robert W. Plaster Stadium • Springfield, MO

- Date: Saturday November 15, 2025
- Game time: 1:00 p.m. MST
- Game attendance: 13,298
- Referee: Rodney Burnette
- TV announcers (ESPN+): Dom West (play-by-play), Tom Mast (analyst) and Cierra Clark (sideline)

Game information

First quarter

- MOST – Shomari Lawrence 10-yard run (Yousef Obeid kick), 7:43. Bears 7–0. Drive: 8 plays, 80 yards, 3:33.
- MOST – Yousef Obeid 29-yard field goal, 2:15. Bears 10–0. Drive: 10 plays, 39 yards, 3:56.

Second quarter

- MOST – Jeron Askren 9-yard pass from Jacob Clark (Yousef Obeid kick), 6:29. Bears 17–0. Drive: 12 plays, 70 yards, 6:21.
- UTEP – Skyler Locklear 1-yard run (Carlos Arreola kick), 1:56. Bears 17–7. Drive: 10 plays, 75 yards, 4:33.
- MOST – Jeron Askren 2-yard pass from Jacob Clark (Yousef Obeid kick), 0:43. Bears 24–7. Drive: 7 plays, 74 yards, 1:08.

Third quarter

- UTEP – Tanner Cragun 26-yard field goal, 9:52. Bears 24–10. Drive: 9 plays, 28 yards, 3:08.
- UTEP – Skyler Locklear 4-yard run (Carlos Arreola kick), 5:06. Bears 24–17. Drive: 7 plays, 54 yards, 2:50.
- UTEP – Ekow Taylor 0-yard blocked punt return (Carlos Arreola kick), 2:15. Tied 24–24.

Fourth quarter

- MOST – Tristian Gardner 12-yard pass from Jacob Clark (Yousef Obeid kick), 11:09. Bears 31–24. Drive: 12 plays, 75 yards, 6:06.
- MOST – Dash Luke 3-yard pass from Jacob Clark (Yousef Obeid kick), 3:12. Bears 38–24. Drive: 11 plays, 74 yards, 7:02.

Statistics	UTEP	MOST
First downs	17	27
Plays–yards	58–240	78–436
Rushes–yards	29–115	39–106
Passing yards	125	330
Passing: Comp–Att–Int	14–29–0	30–39–0
Turnovers	0	0
Time of possession	22:36	37:24

Team	Category	Player	Statistics
UTEP	Passing	Skyler Locklear	14/29, 125 yards
UTEP	Rushing	Skyler Locklear	16 carries, 56 yards, 2 TD
UTEP	Receiving	Eric Willis III	5 receptions, 45 yards
Missouri State	Passing	Jacob Clark	30/39, 330 yards, 4 TD
Missouri State	Rushing	Shomari Lawrence	25 carries, 109 yards, TD
Missouri State	Receiving	Jmariyae Robinson	7 receptions, 88 yards

=== vs. New Mexico State (Battle of I-10) ===
Game Eleven – New Mexico State Aggies (3–7) at UTEP Miners (2–8) – Game summary

Quarter	1	2	3	4	Total
Aggies	0	21	3	10	34
Miners	21	0	3	7	31

at Sun Bowl • El Paso, TX

- Date: Saturday November 22, 2025
- Game time: 1:00 p.m. MST
- Game weather: Sunny, 67 °F (19 °C)
- Game attendance: 16,677
- Referee: Ron Hudson
- TV announcers (ESPN+): Andy Morgan (play-by-play), Ed Stansbury (analyst) and Paige Wood (sideline)

Game information

First quarter

- UTEP – Skyler Locklear 1-yard run (Carlos Arreola kick), 9:58. Miners 7–0. Drive: 5 plays, 66 yards, 1:22.
- UTEP – Ashten Emory 30-yard run (Carlos Arreola kick), 9:42. Miners 14–0. Drive: 1 play, 30 yards, 0:06.
- UTEP – Wondame Davis Jr. 27-yard pass from Skyler Locklear (Carlos Arreola kick), 5:56. Miners 21–0. Drive: 4 plays, 41 yards, 1:05.

Second quarter

- NMSU – Donovan Faupel 8-yard pass from Adam Damante (David Barker kick), 14:57. Miners 21–7. Drive: 12 plays, 75 yards, 5:54.
- NMSU – Donovan Faupel 11-yard pass from Adam Damante (David Barker kick), 7:10. Miners 21–14. Drive: 9 plays, 80 yards, 4:56.
- NMSU – Dijon Stanley 57-yard run (David Barker kick), 5:15. Tied 21–21. Drive: 1 play, 57 yards, 0:08.

Third quarter

- NMSU – David Barker 46-yard field goal, 5:09. Aggies 24–21. Drive: 12 plays, 37 yards, 6:00.
- UTEP – Tanner Cragun 22-yard field goal, 0:06. Tied 24–24. Drive: 12 plays, 79 yards, 4:57.

Fourth quarter

- NMSU – David Barker 24-yard field goal, 10:20. Aggies 27–24. Drive: 13 plays, 66 yards, 4:46.
- UTEP – Kenny Odom 28-yard pass from Skyler Locklear (Carlos Arreola kick), 0:56. Miners 31–27. Drive: 12 plays, 97 yards, 3:23.
- NMSU – TK King 10-yard pass from Adam Damante (David Barker kick), 0:21. Aggies 34–31. Drive: 6 plays, 75 yards, 0:35.

Statistics	NMSU	UTEP
First downs	27	20
Plays–yards	81–470	64–399
Rushes–yards	39–194	34–248
Passing yards	276	151
Passing: Comp–Att–Int	30–42–1	16–30–1
Turnovers	2	1
Time of possession	36:44	23:16

Team	Category	Player	Statistics
New Mexico State	Passing	Adam Damante	29/41, 253 yards, 3 TD, INT
New Mexico State	Rushing	Dijon Stanley	11 carries, 106 yards, TD
New Mexico State	Receiving	Donovan Faupel	9 receptions, 78 yards, 2 TD
UTEP	Passing	Skyler Locklear	16/30, 151 yards, 2 TD, INT
UTEP	Rushing	Ashten Emory	18 carries, 181 yards, TD
UTEP	Receiving	Kenny Odom	8 receptions, 48 yards, TD

=== at Delaware ===
Game Twelve – UTEP Miners (2–9) at Delaware Fightin' Blue Hens (5–6) – Game summary

Quarter	1	2	3	4	Total
Miners	7	13	11	0	31
Fightin' Blue Hens	7	24	10	20	61

at Delaware Stadium • Newark, DE

- Date: Saturday November 29, 2025
- Game time: 11:00 a.m. MST
- Game weather: Sunny, 42 °F (6 °C)
- Game attendance: 13,560
- Referee: Rory Bernard
- TV announcers (ESPN+): Scott Klatzkin (play-by-play) and Pat Devlin (analyst)

Game information

First quarter

- DEL – Nick Minicucci 17-yard run (Nate Reed kick), 11:11. Fightin' Blue Hens 7–0. Drive: 9 plays, 50 yards, 3:40.
- UTEP – Kenny Odom 49-yard pass from Skyler Locklear (Carlos Arreola kick), 11:11. Tied 7–7. Drive: 6 plays, 35 yards, 2:20.

Second quarter

- DEL – Scott Moore 4-yard pass from Nick Minicucci (Nate Reed kick), 15:00. Fightin' Blue Hens 14–7. Drive: 9 plays, 69 yards, 4:04.
- DEL – Nate Reed 37-yard field goal, 10:24. Fightin' Blue Hens 17–7. Drive: 5 plays, 22 yards, 1:30.
- DEL – Gavin Moul 16-yard fumble return (Nate Reed kick), 9:09. Fightin' Blue Hens 24–7.
- UTEP – Josh Schuchts 64-yard pass from Skyler Locklear (Carlos Arreola kick), 5:05. Fightin' Blue Hens 24–14. Drive: 2 plays, 70 yards, 0:36.
- DEL – Jo Silver 2-yard run (Nate Reed kick), 2:01. Fightin' Blue Hens 31–14. Drive: 6 plays, 62 yards, 2:58.
- UTEP – Eric Willis III 2-yard pass from Skyler Locklear (pass failed), 0:41. Fightin' Blue Hens 31–20. Drive: 8 plays, 59 yards, 0:59.

Third quarter

- UTEP – Tanner Cragun 28-yard field goal, 5:25. Fightin' Blue Hens 31–23. Drive: 8 plays, 56 yards, 3:34.
- DEL – Jake Thaw 51-yard pass from Nick Minicucci (Nate Reed kick), 4:38. Fightin' Blue Hens 38–23. Drive: 2 plays, 69 yards, 0:42.
- DEL – Nate Reed 20-yard field goal, 2:04. Fightin' Blue Hens 41–23. Drive: 5 plays, 38 yards, 2:14.
- UTEP – Wondame Davis Jr. 68-yard pass from Skyler Locklear (Skyler Locklear pass to Jaylan Brown), 1:09. Fightin' Blue Hens 41–31. Drive: 3 plays, 75 yards, 0:55.

Fourth quarter

- DEL – Jake Thaw 7-yard pass from Nick Minicucci (Nate Reed kick), 8:02. Fightin' Blue Hens 48–31. Drive: 8 plays, 65 yards, 3:29.
- DEL – Greg Spiller 55-yard run (Nate Reed kick), 4:25. Fightin' Blue Hens 55–31. Drive: 2 plays, 60 yards, 0:55.
- DEL – Nate Reed 32-yard field goal, 2:09. Fightin' Blue Hens 58–31. Drive: 4 plays, 4 yards, 0:17.
- DEL – Nate Reed 43-yard field goal, 0:43. Fightin' Blue Hens 61–31. Drive: 3 plays, -2 yards, 1:28.

Statistics	UTEP	DEL
First downs	18	22
Plays–yards	74–370	74–527
Rushes–yards	33–26	37–216
Passing yards	344	311
Passing: Comp–Att–Int	23–41–5	24–37–0
Turnovers	6	1
Time of possession	26:55	33:05

Team	Category	Player	Statistics
UTEP	Passing	Skyler Locklear	22/39, 338 yards, 4 TD, 5 INT
UTEP	Rushing	Ashten Emory	12 carries, 29 yards
UTEP	Receiving	Wondame Davis Jr.	3 receptions, 112 yards, TD
Delaware	Passing	Nick Minicucci	24/37, 311 yards, 3 TD
Delaware	Rushing	Jo Silver	7 carries, 64 yards, TD
Delaware	Receiving	Kyre Duplessis	4 receptions, 104 yards

== Personnel ==
=== Transfers ===
==== Outgoing ====
Player	Position	Destination
AJ Barton	IOL	Alcorn State
Jaylin Jones	EDGE	Baylor
Ta'ir Brooks	WR	Charlotte
Brandon Jones	LB	Cisco
Kam Herring	DB	East Central CC
Buzz Flabiano	K	Eastern Kentucky
Martavious Collins	TE	Florida Atlantic
Terez Reid	CB	Florida Atlantic
Dillon Williams	CB	Florida Atlantic
Christian Ray	DE	Houston Christian
Javoni Gardere	WR	Idaho State
A'tiq Muhammad	CB	Kent State
Ezell Jolly	RB	Kilgore
Luke Seib	WR	Louisiana Tech
Jake Hall	LB	Maine
Jaleal Williams-Evans	S	Maine
JP Pickles	QB	Mercer
Brennan Smith	IOL	Mississippi State
John Burris III	DB	Morgan State
AJ Odums	DB	Nevada
Logologo Va'a	DL	Nevada
Joey Lightfoot	DL	Nicholls
Kyran Duhon	DE	Oklahoma State
CK Carter	OL	Prairie View A&M
Michael Ray Jr.	DB	Prairie View A&M
Aiden Webb	K	Prairie View A&M
Oscar Moore	S	Sacramento State
Jaden McKinney	DL	Southern Miss
Quinzavious Warren	DL	Southern Miss
RJ Whitehead	OT	Southern Miss
Joshua Dye	RB	Southern Utah
Josiah Dye	DB	Southern Utah
Xavier Phipps	WR	Texas Southern
Amier Boyd-Matthews	DB	Texas Tech
Emari White	WR	Tiffin
Maurice Westmoreland	DE	Tulane
Jevon Jackson	RB	UAB
Josiah Allen	DE	UC Davis
Zachary Essih	TE	Unknown
Jayce Hunter	DB	Unknown
Landon Hullaby	S	Unknown
Jaylon Shelton	CB	Unknown

==== Incoming ====
Player	Position	Previous school
Rio Hay	LS	Arkansas–Pine Bluff
Aramoni Rhone	WR	Arkansas–Pine Bluff
Jaden McKinney	DL	Austin Peay
Garrett Hawkins	LB	Austin Peay
Udoka Ezeani	LB	Boise State
Malachi Nelson	QB	Boise State
Eric Willis III	WR	California (PA)
Hahsaun Wilson	RB	Charlotte
Solo Barnes	DB	Fayetteville State
Cole Gustafson	DL	FIU
Marcell Blocker	CB	Florida Memorial
Shakaun Bowser	DL	Garden City CC
Joshua Thompson	WR	Georgia Southern
Terez Reid	DB	Grand Valley State
Josh Rudolph	LB	Indiana
Neil Campbell	DB	Indiana Wesleyan
Tyler Scott	DL	Kennesaw State
Kelton Farmer	DL	Kentucky Wesleyan
Micah Davey	LB	McNeese
Jaylan Brown	WR	Michigan State
Jayden Wilson	LB	New Mexico
Derek Burns	DE	New Mexico State
Mason Ferguson	WR	North Texas
Dennis Lafferty	OL	Northeastern Oklahoma A&M CC
James Williams	OL	Northeastern Oklahoma A&M CC
Ta’ir Brooks	WR	Northern Arizona
Cardell Cheeks	TE	Northern Colorado
Ashaad Hall	EDGE	South Carolina State
Mark Robinson	OL	Southeastern
Caleb Walker	S	St. Thomas (FL)
Tyler Jones	S	Tennessee State
Donte Thompson	CB	Texas State
Tanner Cragun	K	Utah State
Trevon Tate	WR	UT Martin
Noah Botsford	K/P	Valdosta State
Dekode Lowe	S	West Florida
Oryend Fisher	DL	West Virginia
