= 2025 Louisiana Tech Bulldogs football team =

American college football season

2025 Louisiana Tech Bulldogs football

Independence Bowl champion

Independence Bowl, W 23–14 vs. Coastal Carolina
- Conference: Conference USA
- Record: 8–5 (5–3 CUSA)
- Head coach: Sonny Cumbie (4th season)
- Offensive coordinator: Tony Franklin (4th season)
- Offensive scheme: Spread
- Defensive coordinator: Luke Olson (1st season)
- Base defense: 3–3–5
- Home stadium: Joe Aillet Stadium

2025 Conference USA football standings
	Conf.			Overall
Team	W		L	W		L
Kennesaw State y$	7	–	1	10	–	4
Jacksonville State y	7	–	1	9	–	5
Western Kentucky	6	–	2	9	–	4
Louisiana Tech	5	–	3	8	–	5
FIU	5	–	3	7	–	6
Missouri State	5	–	3	7	–	6
Delaware	4	–	4	7	–	6
Liberty	3	–	5	4	–	8
New Mexico State	2	–	6	4	–	8
Middle Tennessee	2	–	6	3	–	9
Sam Houston	1	–	7	2	–	10
UTEP	1	–	7	2	–	10
Championship: Kennesaw State 19, Jacksonville State 15
$ – Conference champion; y – Championship game participant

The 2025 Louisiana Tech Bulldogs football team represented Louisiana Tech University in Conference USA (CUSA) during the 2025 NCAA Division I FBS football season. The Bulldogs were led by Sonny Cumbie in his fourth year as the head coach. The Bulldogs played their home games at Joe Aillet Stadium, located in Ruston, Louisiana.

== Offseason ==
=== Transfers ===
==== Outgoing ====
Player	Position	Destination
Luke Wisham	S	Arkansas State
Keystone Allison	OL	Baylor
Decoldest Crawford	WR	Butler CC
Ezekiel Durham-Campbell	DE	Coastal Carolina
Buck Buchanan	K	Colorado
Zarian McGill	OL	Colorado
Charlie Robinson	DE	Georgia Military College
Adam Lamar	DL	Grambling State
Blake Thompson	S	Houston
Tamarcus Gray Jr.	WR	Houston Christian
Pig Cage	S	Incarnate Word
Donerio Davenport	RB	Jackson State
Kells Bush	DL	James Madison
Patrick Rea	P	James Madison
Jordon Myles	DB	Livingstone College
Navarion Benson	DB	Louisiana–Monroe
David Blay	DL	Miami (FL)
Hunter Tipton	TE	Middle Tennessee
DeMardrick Blunt	LB	Navarro College
Obinna Okeke	DE	New Mexico State
Solo Lewis	WR	Nicholls State
BJ Blake	S	Norfolk State
John Locke	TE	Oklahoma
Marquis Crosby	RB	Oregon State
Jalen McGaughy	WR	Saginaw Valley State
Dakota Williams	WR	Southeastern Louisiana
Princeton Cahee	RB	Southern
Kendrick Rucker	WR	Texas A&M–Kingsville
Jack Turner	QB	Texas A&M–Kingsville
Jordyn Morgan	S	Texas Southern
Kaden Brown	QB	Trinity Valley CC
J'Dan Burnett	DE	Tulsa
Withchiel Filamar	EDGE	UT Rio Grande
Ja'Marion Kennedy	OL	Wake Forest
Jayden Gray	DE	Western Kentucky
Jamarcus Jones	LB	Unknown
Cedric Woods	DB	Withdrawn

==== Incoming ====
Player	Position	Previous school
Benji Johnson	S	Austin Peay
Jonathan Denis	OL	Central Missouri
Chase Grosfield	WR	Cerritos College
Jaitlin Hampton	DB	Coastal Carolina
Amery Edwards	DE	Copiah–Lincoln CC
Teddy Booras	QB	Diablo Valley College
David Pierro	WR	Diablo Valley College
Caleb Sims	DL	East Texas A&M
Kaleb Coleman	DE	East Texas A&M
Kaden Brown	QB	East Texas Baptist
Jordan Pierro	CB	Fresno State
JayT Jackson	DB	Garden City CC
Jordan McRae	DB	Georgia Military College
Donovan Rieman	DE	Kansas State
Tre Averhart	WR	Keiser
Andrew Burnette	RB	Keiser
Marques Singleton Jr.	WR	Los Medanos College
Clay Thevenin	RB	Navarro College
Lane Condry	DL	Northeastern Oklahoma A&M
Kam Franklin	S	Oklahoma State
Deven Muniz	TE	Pasadena City College
Amari Butler	DB	Pearl River CC
Devin Gandy	WR	Sacramento State
Dane Benedix	WR	Saddleback College
Brayden Bockler	TE	Saddleback College
Trey Kukuk	QB	Saddleback College
Will Hutchens	OL	Sam Houston
Lexington Matthews	P	Savannah State
Kameron Carter	DB	Southwest Mississippi CC
Sam Fongang	DB	Tyler JC
Jayden Madkins	DL	Tyler JC
Emmanuel Oguns	DL	Tyler JC
Luke Seib	WR	UTEP

== Schedule ==
Date	Time	Opponent	Site	TV	Result	Attendance
August 30	6:30 p.m.	Southeastern Louisiana*	Joe Aillet Stadium; Ruston, LA	ESPN+	W 24–0	12,872
September 6	6:30 p.m.	at No. 3 LSU*	Tiger Stadium; Baton Rouge, LA	SECN+/ESPN+	L 7–23	101,667
September 13	6:30 p.m.	New Mexico State	Joe Aillet Stadium; Ruston, LA	ESPN+	W 49–14	13,235
September 20	6:30 p.m.	Southern Miss*	Joe Aillet Stadium; Ruston, LA (Rivalry in Dixie)	ESPN+	W 30–20	17,108
September 27	8:00 p.m.	at UTEP	Sun Bowl; El Paso, TX	ESPN+	W 30–11	13,013
October 9	6:00 p.m.	at Kennesaw State	Fifth Third Stadium; Kennesaw, GA	ESPNU	L 7–35	9,585
October 21	6:30 p.m.	Western Kentucky	Joe Aillet Stadium; Ruston, LA	CBSSN	L 27–28 ^{OT}	10,928
October 31	7:00 p.m.	Sam Houston^{†}	Joe Aillet Stadium; Ruston, LA	CBSSN	W 55–14	17,841
November 8	2:00 p.m.	at Delaware	Delaware Stadium; Newark, DE	ESPN+	L 24–25	17,912
November 15	9:00 p.m.	at Washington State*	Martin Stadium; Pullman, WA	The CW	L 3–28	21,186
November 22	2:00 p.m.	Liberty	Joe Aillet Stadium; Ruston, LA	ESPN+	W 34–28 ^{OT}	10,107
November 29	1:00 p.m.	at Missouri State	Robert W. Plaster Stadium; Springfield, MO	ESPN+	W 42–30	7,656
December 30	1:00 p.m.	vs. Coastal Carolina*	Independence Stadium; Shreveport, LA (Independence Bowl)	ESPN	W 23–14	30,298
*Non-conference game; ^{†}Homecoming; Rankings from AP Poll - Released prior to game; All times are in Central time

== Game summaries ==
=== Southeastern Louisiana (FCS) ===
Game One – Southeastern Louisiana Lions (FCS) (0–0) at Louisiana Tech Bulldogs (0–0) – Game summary

Quarter	1	2	3	4	Total
Lions (FCS)	0	0	0	0	0
Bulldogs	0	3	21	0	24

at Joe Aillet Stadium • Ruston, Louisiana

- Date: August 30
- Game time: 6:30 p.m. CDT
- Game weather: Sunny, 86 °F (30 °C)
- Game attendance: 12,872
- Referee: Garrett Dickerson
- TV announcers (ESPN+): Malcolm Butler (play-by-play), Luke McCown (analyst), and Madison Kaufman (sideline)
- Box score, Recap

Game information

First quarter

- No scoring plays.

Second quarter

- LT – Drew Henderson 18-yard field goal, 0:00. Bulldogs 3–0. Drive: 6 plays, 78 yards, 0:47.

Third quarter

- LT – Omiri Wiggins 17-yard pass from Trey Kukuk (Drew Henderson kick), 12:24. Bulldogs 10–0. Drive: 7 plays, 58 yards, 2:33.
- LT – Clay Thevenin 2-yard run (Drew Henderson kick), 8:32. Bulldogs 17–0. Drive: 7 plays, 50 yards, 2:20.
- LT – Kam Franklin 80-yard fumble return (Drew Henderson kick), 5:12. Bulldogs 24–0.

Fourth quarter

- No scoring plays.

Statistics	SELA	LT
First downs	18	14
Plays–yards	75–271	53–262
Rushes–yards	44–126	34–136
Passing yards	145	126
Passing: comp–att–int	15–31–2	13–19–0
Turnovers	3	0
Time of possession	27:53	32:07

Team	Category	Player	Statistics
Southeastern Louisiana	Passing	Carson Camp	11/22, 122 yards, INT
Southeastern Louisiana	Rushing	Jaedon Henry	8 carries, 31 yards
Southeastern Louisiana	Receiving	Luke Besh	3 receptions, 59 yards
Louisiana Tech	Passing	Trey Kukuk	13/18, 126 yards, TD
Louisiana Tech	Rushing	Clay Thevenin	6 carries, 61 yards, TD
Louisiana Tech	Receiving	Eli Finley	4 receptions, 59 yards

=== At No. 3 LSU ===
Game Two – Louisiana Tech Bulldogs (1–0) at No. 3 LSU Tigers (1–0) – Game summary

Quarter	1	2	3	4	Total
Bulldogs	0	0	0	7	7
No. 3 Tigers	7	3	7	6	23

at Tiger Stadium • Baton Rouge, Louisiana

- Date: September 6
- Game time: 6:30 p.m. CDT
- Game weather: Sunny, 90 °F (32 °C)
- Game attendance: 101,667
- Referee: Jason Autrey
- TV announcers (SECN+/ESPN+): Jay Alter (play-by-play), Rocky Boiman (analyst), and Tori Petry (sideline)
- Box score, Recap

Game information

First quarter

- LSU – Nic Anderson 7-yard pass from Garrett Nussmeier (Damian Ramos kick), 0:12. Tigers 7–0. Drive: 11 plays, 98 yards, 5:37.

Second quarter

- LSU – Damian Ramos 23-yard field goal, 6:24. Tigers 10–0. Drive: 13 plays, 85 yards, 5:07.

Third quarter

- LSU – Caden Durham 3-yard run (Damian Ramos kick), 1:58. Tigers 17–0. Drive: 6 plays, 33 yards, 3:16

Fourth quarter

- LSU – Damian Ramos 46-yard field goal, 11:14. Tigers 20–0. Drive: 11 plays, 38 yards, 4:36.
- LT – Devin Gandy 33-yard pass from Blake Baker (Drew Henderson kick), 4:02. Tigers 20–7. Drive: 13 plays, 74 yards, 4:46.
- LSU – Damian Ramos 19-yard field goal, 1:55. Tigers 23–7. Drive: 6 plays, 48 yards, 1:57.

Statistics	LT	LSU
First downs	12	27
Plays–yards	53–154	75–365
Rushes–yards	27–58	34–128
Passing yards	96	237
Passing: comp–att–int	15–26–0	26–41–1
Turnovers	0	1
Time of possession	23:08	36:52

Team	Category	Player	Statistics
Louisiana Tech	Passing	Trey Kukuk	12/18, 50 yards
Louisiana Tech	Rushing	Clay Thevenin	7 carries, 22 yards
Louisiana Tech	Receiving	Devin Gandy	1 reception, 33 yards, TD
LSU	Passing	Garrett Nussmeier	26/41, 237 yards, TD, INT
LSU	Rushing	Harlem Berry	6 carries, 56 yards
LSU	Receiving	Barion Brown	8 receptions, 84 yards

=== New Mexico State ===
Game Three – New Mexico State Aggies (2–0) at Louisiana Tech Bulldogs (1–1) – Game summary

Quarter	1	2	3	4	Total
Aggies	0	14	0	0	14
Bulldogs	10	17	0	22	49

at Joe Aillet Stadium • Ruston, Louisiana

- Date: September 13
- Game time: 6:30 p.m. CDT
- Game weather: Sunny, 88 °F (31 °C)
- Game attendance: 13,235
- Referee: Douglas Mercer
- TV announcers (ESPN+): Malcolm Butler (play-by-play), Luke McCown (analyst) and Madison Kaufman (sideline)
- Box score, Recap

Game information

First quarter

- LT – John Hoyet Chance 55-yard field goal, 9:50. Bulldogs 3–0. Drive: 5 plays, 28 yards, 1:41.
- LT – Jalen Mickens 40-yard pass from Blake Baker (Drew Henderson kick), 5:36. Bulldogs 10–0. Drive: 7 plays, 91 yards, 2:28.

Second quarter

- LT – Andrew Burnette 11-yard run (Drew Henderson kick), 14:49. Bulldogs 17–0. Drive: 5 plays, 67 yards, 1:15.
- LT – Marlion Jackson 42-yard pass from Trey Kukuk (Drew Henderson kick), 10:23. Bulldogs 24–0. Drive: 9 plays, 75 yards, 3:28.
- NMSU – Brodrick Malone 41-yard pass from Logan Fife (Ryan Hawk kick), 9:46. Bulldogs 24–7. Drive: 2 plays, 75 yards, 0:37.
- NMSU – P. J. Johnson III 38-yard pass from Logan Fife (Ryan Hawk kick), 1:52. Bulldogs 24–14. Drive: 4 plays, 98 yards, 1:57.
- LT – John Hoyet Chance 27-yard field goal, 0:17. Bulldogs 27–14. Drive: 10 plays, 67 yards, 1:30.

Third quarter

- No scoring plays.

Fourth quarter

- LT – Jacob Bradford 20-yard fumble return (Drew Henderson kick), 12:24. Bulldogs 34–14.
- LT – Blake Baker 1-yard run (Blake Baker pass to Clay Thevenin), 9:34. Bulldogs 42–14. Drive: 4 plays, 49 yards, 2:06.
- LT – Omiri Wiggins 17-yard run (Drew Henderson kick), 9:06. Bulldogs 49–14. Drive: 1 play, 17 yards, 0:07.

Statistics	NMSU	LT
First downs	13	28
Plays–yards	50–309	85–574
Rushes–yards	17–26	65–353
Passing yards	283	221
Passing: comp–att–int	17–33–2	11–20–1
Turnovers	3	1
Time of possession	24:30	35:30

Team	Category	Player	Statistics
New Mexico State	Passing	Logan Fife	17/33, 283 yards, 2 TD, 2 INT
New Mexico State	Rushing	Dijon Stanley	5 carries, 18 yards
New Mexico State	Receiving	PJ Johnson III	7 receptions, 157 yards, TD
Louisiana Tech	Passing	Blake Baker	8/16, 182 yards, TD
Louisiana Tech	Rushing	Blake Baker	15 carries, 103 yards, TD
Louisiana Tech	Receiving	David Pierro	3 receptions, 64 yards

=== Southern Miss (Rivalry in Dixie) ===
Game Four – Southern Miss Golden Eagles (2–1) at Louisiana Tech Bulldogs (2–1) – Game summary

Quarter	1	2	3	4	Total
Golden Eagles	10	0	3	7	20
Bulldogs	17	13	0	0	30

at Joe Aillet Stadium • Ruston, Louisiana

- Date: September 20
- Game time: 6:30 p.m. CDT
- Game weather: Sunny, 87 °F (31 °C)
- Game attendance: 17,108
- Referee: Tedd Pitts
- TV announcers (ESPN+): Malcolm Butler (play-by-play), Luke McCown (analyst) and Madison Kaufman (sideline)
- Box score, Recap

Game information

First quarter

- LT – Blake Baker 1-yard run (Drew Henderson kick), 13:43. Bulldogs 7–0. Drive: 2 plays, 74 yards, 0:34.
- USM – Kyirin Heath 30-yard pass from Braylon Braxton (Reed Harradine kick), 12:15. Tied 7–7. Drive: 4 plays, 75 yards, 1:28.
- LT – Drew Henderson 24-yard field goal, 8:10. Bulldogs 10–7. Drive: 9 plays, 69 yards, 4:05.
- USM – Reed Harradine 38-yard field goal, 3:29. Tied 10–10. Drive: 10 plays, 55 yards, 4:41.
- LT – Omiri Wiggins 3-yard run (Drew Henderson kick), 0:46. Bulldogs 17–10. Drive: 7 plays, 65 yards, 2:43.

Second quarter

- LT – Kolbe Fields 48-yard interception return (kick failed), 14:01. Bulldogs 23–10. Drive: 5 plays, 25 yards, 1:45.
- LT – Clay Thevenin 1-yard run (Drew Henderson kick), 0:23. Bulldogs 30–10. Drive: 14 plays, 80 yards, 6:05.

Third quarter

- USM – Reed Harradine 30-yard field goal, 0:58. Bulldogs 30–13. Drive: 7 plays, 52 yards, 1:58.

Fourth quarter

- USM – Davis Dalton 34-yard pass from Braylon Braxton (Reed Harradine kick), 0:22. Bulldogs 30–20. Drive: 9 plays, 80 yards, 1:28.

Statistics	USM	LT
First downs	28	14
Plays–yards	82–514	59–339
Rushes–yards	35–122	38–101
Passing yards	392	238
Passing: comp–att–int	28–47–1	15–21–0
Turnovers	1	0
Time of possession	32:36	27:24

Team	Category	Player	Statistics
Southern Miss	Passing	Braylon Braxton	28/47, 392 yards, 2 TD, INT
Southern Miss	Rushing	Robert Briggs	9 carries, 47 yards
Southern Miss	Receiving	Carl Chester	4 receptions, 118 yards
Louisiana Tech	Passing	Blake Baker	15/21, 238 yards
Louisiana Tech	Rushing	Omiri Wiggins	12 carries, 49 yards, TD
Louisiana Tech	Receiving	Eli Finley	6 receptions, 154 yards

=== At UTEP ===
Game Five – Louisiana Tech Bulldogs (3–1) at UTEP Miners (1–3) – Game summary

Quarter	1	2	3	4	Total
Bulldogs	7	0	3	20	30
Miners	0	0	0	11	11

at Sun Bowl • El Paso, Texas

- Date: September 27
- Game time: 8:00 p.m. CDT / 7:00 p.m. MDT
- Game weather: Sunny, 80 °F (27 °C)
- Game attendance: 13,013
- Referee: Rory Bernard
- TV announcers (ESPN+): Andy Morgan (play-by-play) and Ed Stansbury (analyst)
- Box score, Recap

Game information

First quarter

- LT – Marques Singleton Jr. 5-yard pass from Blake Baker (Drew Henderson kick), 6:14. Bulldogs 7–0. Drive: 10 plays, 60 yards, 4:24.

Second quarter

- No scoring plays.

Third quarter

- LT – Drew Henderson 37-yard field goal, 5:47. Bulldogs 10–0. Drive: 4 plays, 7 yards, 1:49.

Fourth quarter

- UTEP – Tanner Cragun 38-yard field goal, 14:55. Bulldogs 10–3. Drive: 14 plays, 54 yards, 5:52.
- LT – Jakari Foster 67-yard interception return (Drew Henderson kick), 10:22. Bulldogs 17–3. Drive: 2 plays, 0 yards, 0:08.
- LT – Clay Thevenin 4-yard run (Drew Henderson kick), 4:58. Bulldogs 24–3. Drive: 6 plays, 42 yards, 3:26.
- UTEP – Wondame Davis Jr. 35-yard pass from Skyler Locklear (Josh Schuchts pass), 9:34. Bulldogs 24–11. Drive: 4 plays, 49 yards, 2:06.
- LT – Alonzo Jackson Jr. 23-yard interception return (kick failed), 1:44. Bulldogs 30–11. Drive: 1 play, 0 yards, 0:09.

Statistics	LT	UTEP
First downs	16	15
Plays–yards	68–232	73–272
Rushes–yards	42–95	29–126
Passing yards	137	147
Passing: comp–att–int	18–26–1	22–44–5
Turnovers	4	5
Time of possession	32:15	27:45

Team	Category	Player	Statistics
Louisiana Tech	Passing	Blake Baker	18/26, 137 yards, TD, INT
Louisiana Tech	Rushing	Clay Thevenin	19 carries, 68 yards, TD
Louisiana Tech	Receiving	Marlion Jackson	3 receptions, 44 yards
UTEP	Passing	Skyler Locklear	4/6, 74 yards, TD, INT
UTEP	Rushing	Ashten Emory	11 carries, 50 yards
UTEP	Receiving	Wondame Davis Jr.	2 receptions, 58 yards, TD

=== At Kennesaw State ===
Game Six – Louisiana Tech Bulldogs (4–1) at Kennesaw State Owls (3–2) – Game summary

Quarter	1	2	3	4	Total
Bulldogs	7	0	0	0	7
Owls	0	14	7	14	35

at Fifth Third Stadium • Kennesaw, Georgia

- Date: October 9
- Game time: 6:00 p.m. CDT / 7:00 p.m. EDT
- Game weather: Sunny, 67 °F (19 °C)
- Game attendance: 9,585
- Referee: Garrett Dickerson
- TV announcers (ESPNU): Jorge Sedano (play-by-play) and Rodney McLeod (analyst)
- Box score, Recap

Game information

First quarter

- LT – Omiri Wiggins 1-yard run (Drew Henderson kick), 7:12. Bulldogs 7–0. Drive: 13 plays, 70 yards, 4:59.

Second quarter

- KENN – Clayton Coppock 6-yard pass from Dexter Williams II (Britton Williams kick), 8:03. Tied 7–7. Drive: 15 plays, 92 yards, 6:42.
- KENN – Gabriel Benyard 9-yard run (Britton Williams kick), 6:15. Owls 14–7. Drive: 1 play, 9 yards, 0:05.

Third quarter

- KENN – Jordan Jackson 29-yard pass from Dexter Williams II (Britton Williams kick), 9:19. Owls 21–7. Drive: 5 plays, 59 yards, 2:25.

Fourth quarter

- KENN – Lyndon Ravare 7-yard pass from Dexter Williams II (Britton Williams kick), 13:32. Owls 28–7. Drive: 10 plays, 80 yards, 4:37.
- KENN – Coleman Bennett 50-yard pass from Dexter Williams II (Britton Williams kick), 4:45. Owls 35–7. Drive: 11 plays, 87 yards, 7:05.

Statistics	LT	KENN
First downs	21	22
Total yards	75–305	63–400
Rushing yards	40–136	27–110
Passing yards	169	290
Passing: Comp–Att–Int	18–35–2	27–36–0
Turnovers	2	0
Time of possession	29:09	30:51

Team	Category	Player	Statistics
Louisiana Tech	Passing	Evan Bullock	11/21, 112 yards, INT
Louisiana Tech	Rushing	Omiri Wiggins	14 carries, 67 yards, TD
Louisiana Tech	Receiving	Marlion Jackson	3 receptions, 49 yards
Kennesaw State	Passing	Dexter Williams II	27/36, 290 yards, 4 TD
Kennesaw State	Rushing	Coleman Bennett	17 carries, 73 yards
Kennesaw State	Receiving	Christian Moss	4 receptions, 66 yards

=== Western Kentucky ===
Game Seven – Western Kentucky Hilltoppers (5–2) at Louisiana Tech Bulldogs (4–2) – Game summary

Quarter	1	2	3	4	OT	Total
Hilltoppers	10	10	0	0	8	28
Bulldogs	7	0	7	6	7	27

at Joe Aillet Stadium • Ruston, Louisiana

- Date: October 21
- Game time: 6:30 p.m. CDT
- Game weather: Sunny, 69 °F (21 °C)
- Game attendance: 10,928
- Referee: Reed Brotherton
- TV announcers (CBSSN): Jack Gordon (play-by-play) and Taylor McHargue (analyst)
- Box score, Recap

Game information

First quarter

- (10:26) WKU – John Cannon 47-yard field goal (Drive: 10 plays, 46 yards, 4:34; Western Kentucky 3–0)
- (6:46) LT – Tre Averhart 6-yard pass from Blake Baker, John Hoyet Chance kick (Drive: 9 plays, 75 yards, 3:40; Louisiana Tech 7–3)
- (1:09) WKU – La'Vell Wright 15-yard pass from Rodney Tisdale Jr., John Cannon kick (Drive: 11 plays, 75 yards, 5:37; Western Kentucky 10–7)

Second quarter

- (10:41) WKU – George Hart III 1-yard run, John Cannon kick (Drive: 6 plays, 56 yards, 2:02; Western Kentucky 17–7)
- (2:28) WKU – Jack Cassidy 53-yard field goal (Drive: 10 plays, 40 yards, 3:44; Western Kentucky 20–7)

Third quarter

- (14:45) LT – Devin Gandy 85-yard kickoff return, John Hoyet Chance kick (Western Kentucky 20–14)

Fourth quarter

- (14:49) LT – John Hoyet Chance 24-yard field goal (Drive: 13 plays, 59 yards, 4:36; Western Kentucky 20–17)
- (6:20) LT – John Hoyet Chance 24-yard field goal (Drive: 6 plays, 34 yards, 1:23; Tied 20–20)

Overtime

- LT – Andrew Burnette 2-yard run, John Hoyet Chance kick (Drive: 5 plays, 25 yards, 0:00; Louisiana Tech 27–20)
- WKU – George Hart III 4-yard run, Moussa Barry pass (Drive: 8 plays, 25 yards, 0:00; Western Kentucky 28–27)

Statistics	WKU	LT
First downs	21	24
Plays–yards	72–340	83–449
Rushes–yards	38–113	37–109
Passing yards	227	340
Passing: Comp–Att–Int	21–34–1	31–46–1
Turnovers	1	1
Time of possession	31:20	28:40

Team	Category	Player	Statistics
Western Kentucky	Passing	Rodney Tisdale Jr.	21/34, 227 yards, TD, INT
Western Kentucky	Rushing	Rodney Tisdale Jr.	12 carries, 73 yards
Western Kentucky	Receiving	K. D. Hutchinson	6 receptions, 77 yards
Louisiana Tech	Passing	Blake Baker	31/45, 340 yards, TD, INT
Louisiana Tech	Rushing	Blake Baker	10 carries, 49 yards
Louisiana Tech	Receiving	Marlion Jackson	6 receptions, 103 yards

=== Sam Houston ===
Game Eight – Sam Houston Bearkats (0–7) at Louisiana Tech Bulldogs (4–3) – Game summary

Quarter	1	2	3	4	Total
Bearkats	0	14	0	0	14
Bulldogs	14	13	14	14	55

at Joe Aillet Stadium • Ruston, Louisiana

- Date: October 31
- Game time: 7:00 p.m. CDT
- Game weather: Sunny, 64 °F (18 °C)
- Game attendance: 17,841
- Referee: Rory Bernard
- TV announcers (CBSSN): Jack Gordon (play-by-play) and Ben DiNucci (analyst)
- Box score, Recap

Game information

First quarter

- LT – Devin Gandy 36-yard pass from Blake Baker (Drew Henderson kick), 11:48. Bulldogs 7–0. Drive: 7 plays, 74 yards, 3:04.
- LT – Clay Thevenin 6-yard run (Drew Henderson kick), 6:33. Bulldogs 14–0. Drive: 5 plays, 58 yards, 2:10.

Second quarter

- LT – Clay Thevenin 50-yard run (Drew Henderson kick), 13:39. Bulldogs 21–0. Drive: 6 plays, 82 yards, 3:14.
- LT – Blake Baker 1-yard run (kick failed), 6:44. Bulldogs 27–0. Drive: 8 plays, 95 yards, 4:15.

Third quarter

- SHSU – Elijah Green 28-yard run (Christian Pavon kick), 9:23. Bulldogs 27–7. Drive: 5 plays, 67 yards, 2:17.
- LT – Omiri Wiggins 16-yard run (Drew Henderson kick), 5:53. Bulldogs 34–7. Drive: 8 plays, 77 yards, 3:25.
- LT – Clay Thevenin 25-yard run (Drew Henderson kick), 3:25. Bulldogs 41–7. Drive: 3 plays, 66 yards, 0:59.
- SHSU – Elijah Green 80-yard run (Christian Pavon kick), 3:13. Bulldogs 41–14. Drive: 1 play, 80 yards, 0:12.

Fourth quarter

- LT – Jacob Fields 85-yard interception return (Drew Henderson kick), 11:13. Bulldogs 48–14.
- LT – Andrew Burnette 66-yard run (Drew Henderson kick), 5:08. Bulldogs 55–14. Drive: 1 play, 66 yards, 0:13.

Statistics	SHSU	LT
First downs	20	29
Plays–yards	73–503	60–647
Rushes–yards	33–296	39–426
Passing yards	207	221
Passing: comp–att–int	17–40–1	17–21–1
Turnovers	1	2
Time of possession	31:08	28:52

Team	Category	Player	Statistics
Sam Houston	Passing	Hunter Watson	14/33, 193 yards, INT
Sam Houston	Rushing	Elijah Green	10 carries, 191 yards, 2 TD
Sam Houston	Receiving	Chris Reed	6 receptions, 79 yards
Louisiana Tech	Passing	Blake Baker	17/21, 221 yards, TD, INT
Louisiana Tech	Rushing	Clay Thevenin	11 carries, 143 yards, 3 TD
Louisiana Tech	Receiving	Devin Gandy	2 receptions, 78 yards, TD

=== At Delaware ===
Game Nine – Louisiana Tech Bulldogs (5–3) at Delaware Fightin' Blue Hens (4–4) – Game summary

Quarter	1	2	3	4	Total
Bulldogs	7	0	0	17	24
Fightin' Blue Hens	3	6	7	9	25

at Delaware Stadium • Newark, Delaware

- Date: November 8
- Game time: 2:00 p.m. CST / 3:00 p.m. EST
- Game weather: Sunny, 66 °F (19 °C)
- Game attendance: 17,912
- Referee: Rodney Burnette
- TV announcers (ESPN+): Scott Klatzkin (play-by-play) and Pat Devlin (analyst)
- Box score, Recap

Game information

First quarter

- DEL – Nate Reed 28-yard field goal, 2:59. Fightin' Blue Hens 3–0. Drive: 10 plays, 69 yards, 4:48.
- LT – Clay Thevenin 37-yard run (Drew Henderson kick), 0:06. Bulldogs 7–3. Drive: 7 plays, 75 yards, 2:53.

Second quarter

- DEL – Nate Reed 41-yard field goal, 11:05. Bulldogs 7–6. Drive: 11 plays, 51 yards, 4:01.
- DEL – Nate Reed 27-yard field goal, 0:07. Fightin' Blue Hens 9–7. Drive: 9 plays, 59 yards, 1:48.

Third quarter

- DEL – Kyre Duplessis 14-yard pass from Nick Minicucci (Nate Reed kick), 2:44. Fightin' Blue Hens 16–7. Drive: 9 plays, 96 yards, 4:19.

Fourth quarter

- LT – Drew Henderson 22-yard field goal, 9:09. Fightin' Blue Hens 16–10. Drive: 14 plays, 55 yards, 8:35.
- LT – Clay Thevenin 13-yard run (Drew Henderson kick), 3:09. Bulldogs 17–16. Drive: 8 plays, 39 yards, 3:32.
- LT – Jacob Fields 38-yard interception return (Drew Henderson kick), 2:23. Bulldogs 24–16.
- DEL – Elijah Sessoms 3-yard pass from Nick Minicucci (pass failed), 0:34. Bulldogs 24–22. Drive: 8 plays, 75 yards, 1:49.
- DEL – Nate Reed 51-yard field goal, 0:12. Fightin' Blue Hens 25–24. Drive: 4 plays, 6 yards, 0:21.

Statistics	LT	DEL
First downs	22	21
Plays–yards	59–333	76–399
Rushes–yards	34–131	24–95
Passing yards	202	304
Passing: Comp–Att–Int	18–25–1	26–52–2
Turnovers	1	2
Time of possession	30:03	29:57

Team	Category	Player	Statistics
Louisiana Tech	Passing	Evan Bullock	11/15, 95 yards, INT
Louisiana Tech	Rushing	Clay Thevenin	10 carries, 64 yards, 2 TD
Louisiana Tech	Receiving	Jalem Mickens	4 receptions, 42 yards
Delaware	Passing	Nick Minicucci	26/52, 304 yards, 2 TD, 2 INT
Delaware	Rushing	Nick Minicucci	9 carries, 55 yards
Delaware	Receiving	Sean Wilson	5 receptions, 107 yards

=== Washington State ===
Game Ten – Louisiana Tech Bulldogs (5–4) at Washington State Cougars (4–5) – Game summary

Quarter	1	2	3	4	Total
Bulldogs	0	3	0	0	3
Cougars	7	7	0	14	28

at Martin Stadium • Pullman, Washington

- Date: November 15
- Game time: 9:00 p.m. CST / 7:00 p.m. PST
- Game weather: Sunny, 50 °F (10 °C)
- Game attendance: 21,186
- Referee: John Love
- TV announcers (The CW): Ted Robinson (play-by-play), Ryan Leaf (analyst) and Nigel Burton (sideline)
- Box score, Recap

Game information

First quarter

- WSU – Joshua Meredith 23-yard pass from Zevi Eckhaus (Jack Stevens kick), 8:51. Cougars 7–0. Drive: 6 plays, 48 yards, 3:36.

Second quarter

- WSU – Zevi Eckhaus 7-yard run (Jack Stevens kick), 12:11. Cougars 14–0. Drive: 6 plays, 17 yards, 2:27.
- LT – Drew Henderson 51-yard field goal, 0:00. Cougars 14–3. Drive: 8 plays, 30 yards, 1:32.

Third quarter

- No scoring plays

Fourth quarter

- WSU – Zevi Eckhaus 1-yard run (Jack Stevens kick), 13:30. Cougars 21–3. Drive: 14 plays, 66 yards, 8:19.
- WSU – Kirby Vorhees 19-yard run (Jack Stevens kick), 1:12. Cougars 28–3. Drive: 12 plays, 70 yards, 7:34.

Statistics	LT	WSU
First downs	11	19
Plays–yards	51–167	64–303
Rushes–yards	30–107	39–157
Passing yards	60	146
Passing: comp–att–int	9–21–1	17–25–0
Turnovers	1	0
Time of possession	24:57	35:03

Team	Category	Player	Statistics
Louisiana Tech	Passing	Evan Bullock	4/10, 36 yards
Louisiana Tech	Rushing	Andrew Burnette	5 carries, 39 yards
Louisiana Tech	Receiving	Eli Finley	3 receptions, 21 yards
Washington State	Passing	Zevi Eckhaus	17/25, 146 yards, TD
Washington State	Rushing	Kirby Vorhees	16 carries, 76 yards, TD
Washington State	Receiving	Joshua Meredith	5 receptions, 70 yards, TD

=== Liberty ===
Game Eleven – Liberty Flames (4–6) at Louisiana Tech Bulldogs (5–5) – Game summary

Quarter	1	2	3	4	OT	Total
Flames	3	10	15	0	0	28
Bulldogs	7	0	7	14	6	34

at Joe Aillet Stadium • Ruston, Louisiana

- Date: November 22
- Game time: 2:00 p.m. CST
- Game weather: Sunny, 74 °F (23 °C)
- Game attendance: 10,107
- Referee: Rory Bernard
- TV announcers (ESPN+): Malcolm Butler (play-by-play) and Luke McCown (analyst)
- Box score, Recap

Game information

First quarter

- LT – Andrew Burnette 8-yard run (Drew Henderson kick), 8:23. Bulldogs 7–0. Drive: 13 plays, 75 yards, 6:37.
- LU – Jay Billingsley 33-yard field goal, 2:22. Bulldogs 7–3. Drive: 12 plays, 60 yards, 6:01.

Second quarter

- LU – Jay Billingsley 23-yard field goal, 11:12. Bulldogs 7–6. Drive: 9 plays, 80 yards, 3:53.
- LU – Evan Dickens 2-yard run (Jay Billingsley kick), 9:00. Flames 13–7. Drive: 3 plays, 25 yards, 1:12.

Third quarter

- LU – Evan Dickens 2-yard run (Jay Billingsley kick), 13:10. Flames 20–7. Drive: 6 plays, 75 yards, 1:50.
- LU – Jacob Jenkins 6-yard pass from Ethan Vasko (Ethan Vasko run), 7:39. Flames 28–7. Drive: 8 plays, 73 yards, 4:07.
- LT – Trey Kukuk 31-yard run (Kaegan Kent kick), 4:14. Flames 28–14. Drive: 7 plays, 75 yards, 3:25.

Fourth quarter

- LT – Andrew Burnette 3-yard run (Kaegan Kent kick), 10:24. Flames 28–21. Drive: 19 plays, 96 yards, 8:17.
- LT – Trey Kukuk 29-yard run (Kaegan Kent kick), 7:05. Tied 28–28. Drive: 5 plays, 45 yards, 2:05.

Overtime

- LT – Andrew Burnette 25-yard run. Bulldogs 34–28. Drive: 1 play, 25 yards.

Statistics	LU	LT
First downs	23	26
Plays–yards	65–424	75–437
Rushes–yards	44–283	54–319
Passing yards	141	118
Passing: comp–att–int	8–21–4	13–21–1
Turnovers	4	1
Time of possession	27:15	32:45

Team	Category	Player	Statistics
Liberty	Passing	Ethan Vasko	8/21, 141 yards, TD, 4 INT
Liberty	Rushing	Evan Dickens	30 carries, 228 yards, 2 TD
Liberty	Receiving	Caleb Ryan	2 receptions, 72 yards
Louisiana Tech	Passing	Trey Kukuk	13/20, 118 yards
Louisiana Tech	Rushing	Trey Kukuk	19 carries, 143 yards, 2 TD
Louisiana Tech	Receiving	Eli Finley	5 receptions, 58 yards

=== At Missouri State ===
Game Twelve – Louisiana Tech Bulldogs (6–5) at Missouri State Bears (7–4) – Game summary

Quarter	1	2	3	4	Total
Bulldogs	7	7	7	21	42
Bears	0	10	7	13	30

at Robert W. Plaster Stadium • Springfield, Missouri

- Date: November 29
- Game time: 1:00 p.m. CST
- Game weather: Rain, 45 °F (7 °C)
- Game attendance: 7,656
- Referee: Ron Hudson
- TV announcers (ESPN+): Don West (play-by-play), Tom Mast (analyst) and Cierra Clark (sideline)
- Box score, Recap

Game information

First quarter

- LT – Andrew Burnette 98-yard run (Kaegan Kent kick), 10:43. Bulldogs 7–0. Drive: 1 play, 98 yards, 0:15.

Second quarter

- LT – Andrew Burnette 1-yard run (Kaegan Kent kick), 13:54. Bulldogs 14–0. Drive: 11 plays, 85 yards, 5:33.
- MOST – Yousef Obeid 42-yard field goal, 6:36. Bulldogs 14–3. Drive: 14 plays, 53 yards, 7:09.
- MOST – Jmariyae Robinson 23-yard pass from Jacob Clark (Yousef Obeid kick), 1:09. Bulldogs 14–10. Drive: 7 plays, 85 yards, 1:16.

Third quarter

- LT – Trey Kukuk 2-yard run (Kaegan Kent kick), 8:18. Bulldogs 21–10. Drive: 5 plays, 49 yards, 2:30.
- MOST – Shomari Lawrence 56-yard run (Yousef Obeid kick), 7:25. Bulldogs 21–17. Drive: 2 plays, 75 yards, 0:53.

Fourth quarter

- LT – Trey Kukuk 2-yard run (Kaegan Kent kick), 14:12. Bulldogs 28–17. Drive: 16 plays, 78 yards, 8:09.
- MOST – Jeron Askren 75-yard pass from Jacob Clark (run failed), 9:30. Bulldogs 28–23. Drive: 1 play, 75 yards, 0:11.
- LT – Devin Gandy 93-yard kickoff return (Kaegan Kent kick), 9:15. Bulldogs 35–23.
- MOST – Ramone Green Jr. 12-yard run (Yousef Obeid kick), 6:44. Bulldogs 35–30. Drive: 6 plays, 75 yards, 2:31.
- LT – Trey Kukuk 58-yard run (Kaegan Kent kick), 3:44. Bulldogs 42–30. Drive: 5 plays, 82 yards, 2:55.

Statistics	LT	MOST
First downs	20	21
Plays–yards	64–475	58–416
Rushes–yards	51–388	27–122
Passing yards	87	294
Passing: Comp–Att–Int	8–13–0	17–31–1
Turnovers	0	1
Time of possession	33:50	26:10

Team	Category	Player	Statistics
Louisiana Tech	Passing	Trey Kukuk	8/13, 97 yards
Louisiana Tech	Rushing	Trey Kukuk	16 carries, 172 yards, 3 TD
Louisiana Tech	Receiving	Clay Thevenin	4 receptions, 60 yards
Missouri State	Passing	Jacob Clark	17/31, 294 yards, 2 TD, INT
Missouri State	Rushing	Shomari Lawrence	13 carries, 84 yards, TD
Missouri State	Receiving	Jeron Askren	1 reception, 75 yards, TD

=== Vs. Coastal Carolina (Independence Bowl) ===
2025 Independence Bowl
Coastal Carolina Chanticleers (6–6) vs. Louisiana Tech Bulldogs (7–5) – Game summary

Quarter	1	2	3	4	Total
Chanticleers	7	7	0	0	14
Bulldogs	0	3	3	17	23

at Independence Stadium • Shreveport, Louisiana

- Date: December 30
- Game time: 1:00 p.m. CST
- Game weather: Sunny, 44 °F (7 °C)
- Game attendance: 30,298
- Referee: Patrick Foy
- TV announcers (ESPN): Clay Matvick, Chase Daniel, and Harry Lyles Jr.

Game information

First quarter

- CCU – Dominic Knicely 20-yard pass from Tad Hudson (Kian Afrookhteh kick), 1:12. Chanticleers 7–0. Drive: 8 plays, 80 yards, 4:26.

Second quarter

- LT – Kaegan Kent 42-yard field goal, 2:49. Chanticleers 7–3. Drive: 11 plays, 46 yards, 5:26.
- CCU – Roddy Washington 16-yard pass from Tad Hudson (Kian Afrookhteh kick), 1:16. Chanticleers 14–3. Drive: 6 plays, 75 yards, 1:33.

Third quarter

- LT – John Hoyet Chance 51-yard field goal, 11:45. Chanticleers 14–6. Drive: 4 plays, -1 yards, 2:10.

Fourth quarter

- LT – Marlion Jackson 52-yard pass from Trey Kukuk (pass failed), 11:45. Chanticleers 14–12. Drive: 1 play, 52 yards, 0:11.
- LT – Andrew Burnette 1-yard run (Trey Kukuk pass to Andrew Burnette), 8:09. Bulldogs 20–14. Drive: 3 plays, 34 yards, 1:23.
- LT – Kaegan Kent 35-yard field goal, 0:56. Bulldogs 23–14. Drive: 4 plays, 3 yards, 0:56.

Statistics	CCU	LT
First downs	19	12
Plays–yards	74–356	66–295
Rushes–yards	25–45	47–181
Passing yards	311	114
Passing: Comp–Att–Int	25–49–2	9–19–1
Turnovers	3	4
Time of possession	28:08	31:52

Team	Category	Player	Statistics
Coastal Carolina	Passing	Tad Hudson	25/49, 311 yards, 2 TD, 2 INT
Coastal Carolina	Rushing	Jevon Edwards	9 carries, 36 yards
Coastal Carolina	Receiving	Bryson Graves	6 receptions, 99 yards
Louisiana Tech	Passing	Trey Kukuk	9/19, 114 yards, TD, INT
Louisiana Tech	Rushing	Trey Kukuk	19 carries, 121 yards
Louisiana Tech	Receiving	Marlion Jackson	3 receptions, 87 yards, TD
