= Elizabethton High School =

Location
- 907 Jason Witten Way; Elizabethton, Tennessee, Carter County 37643; United States
- 36.3456°N 82.2285°W

Information
- School type: Public
- Established: 1908
- School district: Elizabethton City Schools
- NCES District ID: 4701110
- Superintendent: Richard VanHuss
- NCES School ID: 470111000351
- Principal: Jon Minton
- Grades: 9-12
- Enrollment: 860
- Colors: Orange and black
- Mascot: Fighting Cyclone
- Website: ehs.ecschools.net

Elizabethton High School (EHS) is a public high school in Elizabethton, Tennessee. The school is on a 32-acre campus. It had 860 students in 2026. The former school building, which was built in 1947, became T.A. Dugger Jr. High School when EHS's campus moved to its current site in January of 1974.

== History ==
Elizabethton High School was founded in 1908 as a combined elementary and high school. It became a High School in 1925 after a bond allowed the city to separate the elementary and high school.

In 1939, a new building for Elizabethton High School was constructed. Today, the building remains as T.A. Dugger Jr. High School.

In 1999, the school made national headlines after students created a nativity scene with cat cadavers for a decorating contest. After three days, a group of students took down the display. They were suspended afterwards.

== Demographics ==
The student body is 90 percent white.

== Athletics ==
Cyclones are the school mascot.

In 1938, Elizabethton High School received its first state championship title for football. This would be their only state championship in football until 2019, when Coach Shawn Witten would take his team to a 15-0 undefeated season and the schools first state title in 82 years. They would go back-to-back in 2020, but would come short the following year in 2021. During that three-year stint, the Cyclones at one point had an undefeated streak of 31-0 until it was broken by the Greeneville Greene Devils in 2021.

The Cyclones Football team played at Brown-Childress Stadium at the former high school site, now T.A. Dugger Jr. High School, from 1947 until 2014, when the team moved to the newly built Citizens' Bank Stadium on campus.

The Cyclones boys' track and field team would take home a state title in 2004 and 2005. 2004 also saw the boys' cross country team win its first state title as well.

In 2014, the Lady Cyclones basketball team won its first state title with a record of 32-3, as well as Kayla Marosites winning the MVP for the 2014 finals game and the TSSAA Miss Basketball awards the following two years.

In 2026, a new athletic center named for former head football coach, Dave Rider, was officially opened.

== Notable alumni ==
- Parker Hughes, NFL football linebacker for the Jacksonville Jaguars
