= 2025 Conference USA football season =

- League: NCAA Division I Football Bowl Subdivision
- Sport: Football
- Duration: August 23 – December 5, 2025
- Teams: 12

2026 NFL draft

Regular season
- Season champions: Jacksonville State
- Runners-up: Kennesaw State

CUSA Championship Game
- Date: December 5, 2025
- Venue: AmFirst Stadium, Jacksonville, Alabama
- Champions: Kennesaw State
- Runners-up: Jacksonville State

Seasons
- ← 2024 2026 →

2025 Conference USA football standings
	Conf.			Overall
Team	W		L	W		L
Kennesaw State y$	7	–	1	10	–	4
Jacksonville State y	7	–	1	9	–	5
Western Kentucky	6	–	2	9	–	4
Louisiana Tech	5	–	3	8	–	5
FIU	5	–	3	7	–	6
Missouri State	5	–	3	7	–	6
Delaware	4	–	4	7	–	6
Liberty	3	–	5	4	–	8
New Mexico State	2	–	6	4	–	8
Middle Tennessee	2	–	6	3	–	9
Sam Houston	1	–	7	2	–	10
UTEP	1	–	7	2	–	10
Championship: Kennesaw State 19, Jacksonville State 15
$ – Conference champion; y – Championship game participant

The 2025 Conference USA football season is the 30th season of college football play for Conference USA (CUSA). The season began on August 23, 2025, and concluded with the Conference Championship Game on December 5, 2025. Twelve member schools took part in the season, which was part of the 2025 NCAA Division I FBS football season.

== Conference realignment ==
For 2025, two teams — Delaware and Missouri State — joined the conference after moving up from Division I FCS. By NCAA rules, both teams were declared ineligible for post-season play while they finish their transition to the FBS level. However, because there were not enough six-win teams eligible for the 42 FBS bowl games, both teams will be participating in a bowl game.

The 2025 season is set to be the final season for UTEP in Conference USA. UTEP accepted an invitation to join the Mountain West Conference beginning in 2026.

This is potentially the final season for Louisiana Tech in CUSA. Louisiana Tech accepted an invitation to rejoin the Sun Belt Conference, which it had left in 2001, effective no later than 2027.

== Preseason ==
The Conference USA decided not to conduct a preseason media poll this season, instead devising a "bowl confidence index," through which 24 voters — two from each Conference USA member school — would select which CUSA members they believed would or would not reach a bowl game at the conclusion of the 2025 regular season. The conference published the results of the vote on July 18, 2025.

2025 CUSA Bowl Confidence Index
Team	Pct. of Vote
Liberty	100%
Western Kentucky	100%
Jacksonville State	91.67%
Louisiana Tech	75%
Sam Houston	45.83%
UTEP	41.67%
FIU	37.5%
Delaware	29.17%
Middle Tennessee	25%
New Mexico State	25%
Kennesaw State	16.67%
Missouri State	12.5%

== Head coaches ==
- On November 10, 2024, Kennesaw State head coach Brian Bohannon announced that he was stepping down from the position, effective immediately. On December 1, 2024, Kennesaw State announced Jerry Mack as the new head coach. Mack had previously been the running backs coach of the Jacksonville Jaguars in the NFL.
- On December 1, K. C. Keeler was announced as the new head coach of Temple in the American Athletic Conference. On December 18, 2024, Sam Houston announced Phil Longo as the new head coach for 2025. Longo had previously been the offensive coordinator at Wisconsin.
- On December 12, 2024, Rich Rodriguez was named as the new head coach of West Virginia in the Big 12 Conference. On December 21, 2024, Jacksonville State announced Charles Kelly as the new head coach for 2025. Kelly had previously been the co-defesnive coordinator at Auburn.
- On December 1, 2024, FIU announced they had fired head coach Mike MacIntyre. On December 7, 2024, FIU named Willie Simmons as their new head coach for the 2025 season. Simmons had previously been the running backs coach at Duke.

Note: All stats shown are before the start of the 2025 season.

Team	Head coach	Years at school	Overall record	Record at school	CUSA record
Delaware	Ryan Carty	4	26–11	26–11	0–0
FIU	Willie Simmons	1	66–24	0–0	0–0
Jacksonville State	Charles Kelly	1	0–0	0–0	0–0
Kennesaw State	Jerry Mack	1	31–15	0–0	0–0
Liberty	Jamey Chadwell	3	119–62	21–5	13–3
Louisiana Tech	Sonny Cumbie	4	13–29	11–26	8–16
Middle Tennessee	Derek Mason	2	30–64	3–9	2–6
Missouri State	Ryan Beard	3	12–11	12–11	0–0
New Mexico State	Tony Sanchez	2	23–49	3–9	2–6
Sam Houston	Phil Longo	1	7–14	0–0	0–0
UTEP	Scotty Walden	2	37–29	3–9	3–4
Western Kentucky	Tyson Helton	7	48–32	48–32	34–13

== Rankings ==
		Pre	Wk 1	Wk 2	Wk 3	Wk 4	Wk 5	Wk 6	Wk 7	Wk 8	Wk 9	Wk 10	Wk 11	Wk 12	Wk 13	Wk 14	Wk 15	Final
Delaware	AP																	
Delaware	C																	
Delaware	CFP	Not released																
FIU	AP																	
FIU	C	NR	RV	NR														
FIU	CFP	Not released																
Jacksonville State	AP																	
Jacksonville State	C																	
Jacksonville State	CFP	Not released																
Kennesaw State	AP																RV	
Kennesaw State	C																RV	
Kennesaw State	CFP	Not released																
Liberty	AP	RV	RV	NR														
Liberty	C																	
Liberty	CFP	Not released																
Louisiana Tech	AP																	
Louisiana Tech	C																	
Louisiana Tech	CFP	Not released																
Middle Tennessee	AP																	
Middle Tennessee	C																	
Middle Tennessee	CFP	Not released																
Missouri State	AP																	
Missouri State	C																	
Missouri State	CFP	Not released																
New Mexico State	AP																	
New Mexico State	C																	
New Mexico State	CFP	Not released																
Sam Houston	AP																	
Sam Houston	C																	
Sam Houston	CFP	Not released																
UTEP	AP																	
UTEP	C																	
UTEP	CFP	Not released																
Western Kentucky	AP																	
Western Kentucky	C																	
Western Kentucky	CFP	Not released																

Legend
	Improvement in ranking
	Drop in ranking
	Not ranked previous week
	No change in ranking from previous week
RV	Received votes but were not ranked in Top 25 of poll
т	Tied with team above or below also with this symbol

== Schedule ==
The 2025 schedule was released on February 6, 2025.

Index to colors and formatting
CUSA member won
CUSA member lost
CUSA teams in **bold**

=== Week 0 ===
Date	Time	Visiting team	Home team	Site	TV	Result	Attendance	Ref.
August 23	7:00 p.m.	**Sam Houston**	**Western Kentucky**	Houchens Industries–L. T. Smith Stadium • Bowling Green, KY	CBSSN	**WKU** 41–24	15,312	
^{#}Rankings from AP Poll released prior to game. All times are in Eastern Time.

=== Week 1 ===
Date	Time	Visiting team	Home team	Site	TV	Result	Attendance	Ref.
August 28	7:00 p.m.	**Jacksonville State**	UCF	Acrisure Bounce House • Orlando, FL	ESPN+	**L** 10–17	43,043	
August 28	7:00 p.m.	Delaware State	**Delaware**	Delaware Stadium • Newark, DE (Route 1 Rivalry)	ESPN+	**W** 35–17	17,895	
August 29	7:00 p.m.	**Kennesaw State**	Wake Forest	Allegacy Federal Credit Union Stadium • Winston-Salem, NC	ACCN	**L** 9–10	30,789	
August 29	8:15 p.m.	Bethune–Cookman	**FIU**	Pitbull Stadium • Miami, FL	ESPN+	**W** 42–9	18,034	
August 29	9:30 p.m.	UNLV	**Sam Houston**	Shell Energy Stadium • Houston, TX	CBSSN	**L** 21–38	5,837	
August 30	4:00 p.m.	Maine	**Liberty**	Williams Stadium • Lynchburg, VA	ESPN+	**W** 28–7	20,337	
August 30	7:00 p.m.	Austin Peay	**Middle Tennessee**	Johnny "Red" Floyd Stadium • Murfreesboro, TN	ESPN+	**L** 14–34	18,505	
August 30	7:00 p.m.	North Alabama	**Western Kentucky**	Houchens Industries–L. T. Smith Stadium • Bowling Green, KY	ESPN+	**W** 55–6	12,226	
August 30	7:30 p.m.	Southeastern Louisiana	**Louisiana Tech**	Joe Aillet Stadium • Ruston, LA	ESPN+	**W** 24–0	12,872	
August 30	7:30 p.m.	**Missouri State**	USC	Los Angeles Memorial Coliseum • Los Angeles, CA	BTN	**L** 13–73	62,841	
August 30	7:30 p.m.	**UTEP**	Utah State	Maverik Stadium • Logan, UT	CBSSN	**L** 16–28	16,448	
August 30	9:00 p.m.	Bryant	**New Mexico State**	Aggie Memorial Stadium • Las Cruces, NM	ESPN+	**W** 19–3	10,058	
^{#}Rankings from AP Poll released prior to game. All times are in Eastern Time.

=== Week 2 ===
Date	Time	Visiting team	Home team	Site	TV	Result	Attendance	Ref.
September 6	12:00 p.m.	**FIU**	No. 2 Penn State	Beaver Stadium • University Park, PA	BTN	**L** 0–34	103,817	
September 6	12:00 p.m.	**Kennesaw State**	No. 23 Indiana	Memorial Stadium • Bloomington, IN	FS1	**L** 9–56	43,801	
September 6	12:00 p.m.	**Liberty**	**Jacksonville State**	AmFirst Stadium • Jacksonville, AL	CBSSN	**JVST** 34–24	20,755	
September 6	3:30 p.m.	**Delaware**	Colorado	Folsom Field • Boulder, CO	FOX	**L** 7–31	50,341	
September 6	4:00 p.m.	**Middle Tennessee**	Wisconsin	Camp Randall Stadium • Madison, WI	FS1	**L** 10–42	70,368	
September 6	6:00 p.m.	**Missouri State**	Marshall	Joan C. Edwards Stadium • Huntington, WV	ESPN+	**W** 21–20	28,564	
September 6	7:00 p.m.	**Western Kentucky**	Toledo	Glass Bowl • Toledo, OH	ESPN+	**L** 21–45	24,138	
September 6	7:30 p.m.	**Louisiana Tech**	No. 3 LSU	Tiger Stadium • Baton Rouge, LA	SECN+/ESPN+	**L** 7–23	101,667	
September 6	9:00 p.m.	Tulsa	**New Mexico State**	Aggie Memorial Stadium • Las Cruces, NM	ESPN+	**W** 21–14	10,240	
September 6	9:00 p.m.	UT Martin	**UTEP**	Sun Bowl • El Paso, TX	ESPN+	**W** 42–17	31,122	
September 6	11:59 p.m.	**Sam Houston**	Hawaii	Clarence T. C. Ching Athletics Complex • Honolulu, HI	Spectrum Sports	**L** 20–37	11,625	
^{#}Rankings from AP Poll released prior to game. All times are in Eastern Time.

=== Week 3 ===
Date	Time	Visiting team	Home team	Site	TV	Result	Attendance	Ref.
September 13	3:00 p.m.	UConn	**Delaware**	Delaware Stadium • Newark, DE	ESPN+	**W** 44–41 ^{OT}	17,862	
September 13	3:30 p.m.	SMU	**Missouri State**	Robert W. Plaster Stadium • Springfield, MO	CBSSN	**L** 10–28	15,027	
September 13	4:15 p.m.	**UTEP**	No. 7 Texas	Darrell K Royal–Texas Memorial Stadium • Austin, TX	SECN	**L** 10–27	102,025	
September 13	5:00 p.m.	**Liberty**	Bowling Green	Doyt Perry Stadium • Bowling Green, OH	ESPN+	**L** 13–23	23,159	
September 13	5:00 p.m.	**Middle Tennessee**	Nevada	Mackay Stadium • Reno, NV	KNSN-TV	**W** 14–13	16,808	
September 13	6:00 p.m.	Merrimack	**Kennesaw State**	Fifth Third Stadium • Kennesaw, GA	ESPN+	**W** 27–13	11,040	
September 13	7:00 p.m.	**Jacksonville State**	Georgia Southern	Paulson Stadium • Statesboro, GA	ESPN+	**L** 34–41	24,585	
September 13	7:30 p.m.	**New Mexico State**	**Louisiana Tech**	Joe Aillet Stadium • Ruston, LA	ESPN+	**LT** 49–14	13,235	
September 13	8:30 p.m.	Florida Atlantic	**FIU**	Pitbull Stadium • Miami, FL (Shula Bowl)	ESPN+	**W** 38–28	17,638	
^{#}Rankings from AP Poll released prior to game. All times are in Eastern Time.

=== Week 4 ===
Date	Time	Visiting team	Home team	Site	TV	Result	Attendance	Ref.
September 20	3:30 p.m.	James Madison	**Liberty**	Williams Stadium • Lynchburg, VA (Battle of the Blue Ridge)	ESPNU	**L** 13–31	24,022	
September 20	6:00 p.m.	**Delaware**	**FIU**	Pitbull Stadium • Miami, FL	ESPN+	**DEL** 38–16	11,705	
September 20	6:00 p.m.	Arkansas State	**Kennesaw State**	Fifth Third Stadium • Kennesaw, GA	ESPN+	**W** 28–21	10,713	
September 20	7:00 p.m.	Murray State	**Jacksonville State**	AmFirst Stadium • Jacksonville, AL	ESPN+	**W** 45–10	21,426	
September 20	7:00 p.m.	Marshall	**Middle Tennessee**	Johnny "Red" Floyd Stadium • Murfreesboro, TN	ESPN+	**L** 28–42	15,168	
September 20	7:00 p.m.	UT Martin	**Missouri State**	Robert W. Plaster Stadium • Springfield, MO	ESPN+	**W** 42–10	14,476	
September 20	7:00 p.m.	Nevada	**Western Kentucky**	Houchens Industries–L. T. Smith Stadium • Bowling Green, KY	ESPN+	**W** 31–16	17,247	
September 20	7:30 p.m.	Southern Miss	**Louisiana Tech**	Joe Aillet Stadium • Ruston, LA (Rivalry in Dixie)	ESPN+	**W** 30–20	17,108	
September 20	8:00 p.m.	**Sam Houston**	No. 8 Texas	Darrell K Royal–Texas Memorial Stadium • Austin, TX	ESPN+/SECN+	**L** 0–55	103,003	
September 20	9:00 p.m.	Louisiana–Monroe	**UTEP**	Sun Bowl • El Paso, TX	ESPN+	**L** 25–31	15,272	
^{#}Rankings from AP Poll released prior to game. All times are in Eastern Time.

=== Week 5 ===
Date	Time	Visiting team	Home team	Site	TV	Result	Attendance	Ref.
September 27	4:00 p.m.	New Mexico State	New Mexico	University Stadium • Albuquerque, NM (Rio Grande Rivalry)	Altitude	**L** 20–38	37,440	
September 27	6:00 p.m.	Middle Tennessee	**Kennesaw State**	Fifth Third Stadium • Kennesaw, GA	ESPN+	**KENN** 24–16	11,040	
September 27	6:00 p.m.	Liberty	Old Dominion	S.B. Ballard Stadium • Norfolk, VA	ESPN+	**L** 7–21	18,435	
September 27	7:00 p.m.	Jacksonville State	Southern Miss	M. M. Roberts Stadium • Hattiesburg, MS	ESPN+	**L** 25–42	25,034	
September 27	7:00 p.m.	Western Kentucky	**Missouri State**	Robert W. Plaster Stadium • Springfield, MO	ESPN+	**WKU** 27–22	10,068	
September 27	9:00 p.m.	Louisiana Tech	**UTEP**	Sun Bowl • El Paso, TX	ESPN+	**LT** 30–11	13,013	
^{#}Rankings from AP Poll released prior to game. All times are in Eastern Time.

=== Week 6 ===
Date	Time	Visiting team	Home team	Site	TV	Result	Attendance	Ref.
October 2	9:00 p.m.	**Sam Houston**	**New Mexico State**	Aggie Memorial Stadium • Las Cruces, NM	CBSSN	**NMSU** 37–10	9,089	
October 3	7:00 p.m.	**Western Kentucky**	**Delaware**	Delaware Stadium • Newark, DE	CBSSN	**WKU** 27–24	19,176	
October 4	3:30 p.m.	**FIU**	UConn	Pratt & Whitney Stadium at Rentschler Field • East Hartford, CT	CBSSN	**L** 10–51	27,310	
^{#}Rankings from AP Poll released prior to game. All times are in Eastern Time.

=== Week 7 ===
Date	Time	Visiting team	Home team	Site	TV	Result	Attendance	Ref.
October 8	7:30 p.m.	**Missouri State**	**Middle Tennessee**	Johnny "Red" Floyd Stadium • Murfreesboro, TN	ESPN2	**MSU** 22–20	9,806	
October 8	8:00 p.m.	**Liberty**	**UTEP**	Sun Bowl • El Paso, TX	CBSSN	**LIB** 19–8	9,286	
October 9	7:00 p.m.	**Louisiana Tech**	**Kennesaw State**	Fifth Third Stadium • Kennesaw, GA	ESPNU	**KENN** 35–7	9,585	
October 9	8:00 p.m.	**Jacksonville State**	**Sam Houston**	Shell Energy Stadium • Houston, TX	CBSSN	**JVST** 29–27	5,419	
^{#}Rankings from AP Poll released prior to game. All times are in Eastern Time.

=== Week 8 ===
Date	Time	Visiting team	Home team	Site	TV	Result	Attendance	Ref.
October 14	7:00 p.m.	**New Mexico State**	**Liberty**	Williams Stadium • Lynchburg, VA	CBSSN	**LIB** 30–27	16,312	
October 14	8:00 p.m.	**FIU**	**Western Kentucky**	Houchens Industries–L. T. Smith Stadium • Bowling Green, KY	ESPNU	**FIU** 25–6	12,276	
October 15	7:00 p.m.	**Delaware**	**Jacksonville State**	AmFirst Stadium • Jacksonville, AL	ESPN	**JVST** 38–25	16,884	
October 15	7:00 p.m.	**UTEP**	**Sam Houston**	Shell Energy Stadium • Houston, TX	CBSSN	**UTEP** 35–17	4,657	
^{#}Rankings from AP Poll released prior to game. All times are in Eastern Time.

=== Week 9 ===
Date	Time	Visiting team	Home team	Site	TV	Result	Attendance	Ref.
October 21	7:00 p.m.	**Kennesaw State**	**FIU**	Pitbull Stadium • Miami, FL	ESPN2	**KENN** 45–26	12,123	
October 21	7:30 p.m.	**Western Kentucky**	**Louisiana Tech**	Joe Aillet Stadium • Ruston, LA	CBSSN	**WKU** 28–27 ^{OT}	10,928	
October 22	7:30 p.m.	**Middle Tennessee**	**Delaware**	Delaware Stadium • Newark, DE	ESPN2	**DEL** 31–28	14,102	
October 22	9:00 p.m.	**Missouri State**	**New Mexico State**	Aggie Memorial Stadium • Las Cruces, NM	CBSSN	**MSU** 24–17 ^{OT}	8,790	
^{#}Rankings from AP Poll released prior to game. All times are in Eastern Time.

=== Week 10 ===
Date	Time	Visiting team	Home team	Site	TV	Result	Attendance	Ref.
October 28	8:00 p.m.	UTEP	Kennesaw State	Fifth Third Stadium • Kennesaw, GA	ESPNU	**KENN** 33–20	11,040	
October 29	7:30 p.m.	Jacksonville State	Middle Tennessee	Johnny "Red" Floyd Stadium • Murfreesboro, TN	ESPN2	**JVST** 24–21	10,200	
October 29	8:00 p.m.	FIU	Missouri State	Robert W. Plaster Stadium • Springfield, MO	CBSSN	**MSU** 28–21	8,754	
October 31	8:00 p.m.	Sam Houston	Louisiana Tech	Joe Aillet Stadium • Ruston, LA	CBSSN	**LT** 55–14	17,841	
November 1	3:30 p.m.	Delaware	Liberty	Williams Stadium • Lynchburg, VA	CBSSN	**LIB** 59–30	18,455	
November 1	3:30 p.m.	New Mexico State	Western Kentucky	Houchens Industries–L. T. Smith Stadium • Bowling Green, KY	ESPN+	**WKU** 35–16	15,023	
^{#}Rankings from AP Poll released prior to game. All times are in Eastern Time.

=== Week 11 ===
Date	Time	Visiting team	Home team	Site	TV	Result	Attendance	Ref.
November 8	1:00 p.m.	Missouri State	**Liberty**	Williams Stadium • Lynchburg, VA	ESPN+	**MSU** 21–17	18,407	
November 8	3:00 p.m.	FIU	**Middle Tennessee**	Johnny "Red" Floyd Stadium • Murfreesboro, TN	ESPN+	**FIU** 56–30	12,227	
November 8	3:00 p.m.	Louisiana Tech	**Delaware**	Delaware Stadium • Newark, DE	ESPN+	**DEL** 25–24	17,912	
November 8	3:00 p.m.	Jacksonville State	**UTEP**	Sun Bowl • El Paso, TX	ESPN+	**JVST** 30–27	9,536	
November 8	4:00 p.m.	Kennesaw State	**New Mexico State**	Aggie Memorial Stadium • Las Cruces, NM	ESPN+	**KENN** 24–21	11,473	
November 8	10:00 p.m.	Sam Houston	Oregon State	Reser Stadium • Corvallis, OR	The CW	**W** 21–17	31,626	
^{#}Rankings from College Football Playoff. All times are in Eastern Time.

=== Week 12 ===
Date	Time	Visiting team	Home team	Site	TV	Result	Attendance	Ref.
November 15	3:00 p.m.	UTEP	**Missouri State**	Robert W. Plaster Stadium • Springfield, MO	ESPN+	**MSU** 38–24		
November 15	3:30 p.m.	Middle Tennessee	**Western Kentucky**	Houchens Industries–L. T. Smith Stadium • Bowling Green, KY (100 Miles of Hate)	ESPN+	**WKU** 42–26		
November 15	4:15 p.m.	New Mexico State	Tennessee	Neyland Stadium • Knoxville, TN	SECN	**L** 9–42		
November 15	5:00 p.m.	Liberty	**FIU**	Pitbull Stadium • Miami, FL	ESPN+	**FIU** 34–27 ^{OT}		
November 15	7:00 p.m.	Delaware	**Sam Houston**	Shell Energy Stadium • Houston, TX	ESPN+	**SHSU** 26–23		
November 15	8:00 p.m.	Kennesaw State	**Jacksonville State**	AmFirst Stadium • Jacksonville, AL	ESPNU	**JVST** 35–26		
November 15	10:00 p.m.	Louisiana Tech	Washington State	Martin Stadium • Pullman, WA	The CW	**L** 3–28		
^{#}Rankings from College Football Playoff. All times are in Eastern Time.

=== Week 13 ===
Date	Time	Visiting team	Home team	Site	TV	Result	Attendance	Ref.
November 22	12:00 p.m.	Delaware	Wake Forest	Allegacy Federal Credit Union Stadium • Winston-Salem, NC	ACCN	**L** 14–52		
November 22	2:00 p.m.	Missouri State	**Kennesaw State**	Fifth Third Stadium • Kennesaw, GA	ESPN+	**KENN** 41–34		
November 22	3:00 p.m.	Liberty	**Louisiana Tech**	Joe Aillet Stadium • Ruston, LA	ESPN+	**LT** 34–28 ^{OT}		
November 22	3:00 p.m.	New Mexico State	**UTEP**	Sun Bowl • El Paso, TX (Battle of I-10)	ESPN+	**NMSU** 34–31		
November 22	3:00 p.m.	Sam Houston	**Middle Tennessee**	Johnny "Red" Floyd Stadium • Murfreesboro, TN	ESPN+	**MTSU** 31–17		
November 22	3:30 p.m.	Jacksonville State	**FIU**	Pitbull Stadium • Miami, FL	CBSSN	**FIU** 27–21		
November 22	7:45 p.m.	Western Kentucky	LSU	Tiger Stadium • Baton Rouge, LA	SECN	**L** **L** 10–13		
^{#}Rankings from College Football Playoff. All times are in Eastern Time.

=== Week 14 ===
Date	Time	Visiting team	Home team	Site	TV	Result	Attendance	Ref.
November 29	1:00 p.m.	UTEP	Delaware	Delaware Stadium • Newark, DE	ESPN+	**DEL** 61–31		
November 29	1:00 p.m.	FIU	Sam Houston	Shell Energy Stadium • Houston, TX	ESPN+	**FIU** 56–16		
November 29	2:00 p.m.	Western Kentucky	Jacksonville State	AmFirst Stadium • Jacksonville, AL	ESPN+	**JVST** 37–34		
November 29	2:00 p.m.	Louisiana Tech	Missouri State	Robert W. Plaster Stadium • Springfield, MO	ESPN+	**LT** 42–30		
November 29	3:00 p.m.	Middle Tennessee	New Mexico State	Aggie Memorial Stadium • Las Cruces, NM	ESPN+	**MTSU** 31–24 ^{OT}		
November 29	3:30 p.m.	Kennesaw State	Liberty	Williams Stadium • Lynchburg, VA	CBSSN	**KENN** 48–42 ^{2OT}		
^{#}Rankings from College Football Playoff. All times are in Eastern Time.

=== Conference Championship Game ===
Date	Time	Visiting team	Home team	Site	TV	Result	Attendance	Ref.
December 5		**Kennesaw State**	**Jacksonville State**	AmFirst Stadium • Jacksonville, AL	CBSSN	**KENN** 19–15		
^{#}Rankings from College Football Playoff. All times are in Eastern Time.

== Postseason ==
=== Bowl Games ===
Legend
CUSA win
CUSA loss

Bowl game	Date	Site	Television	Time (EST)	CUSA team	Opponent	Score	Attendance
Salute to Veterans Bowl	December 16	Cramton Bowl • Montgomery, AL	ESPN	9:00 p.m.	Jacksonville State	Troy	W 17–13	15,721
68 Ventures Bowl	December 17	Hancock Whitney Stadium • Mobile, AL	ESPN	8:30 p.m.	Delaware	Louisiana	W 20–13	17,234
Xbox Bowl	December 18	Ford Center at The Star • Frisco, TX	ESPN2	9:00 p.m.	Missouri State	Arkansas State	L 28–34	7,782
Myrtle Beach Bowl	December 19	Brooks Stadium • Conway, SC	ESPN	11:00 a.m.	Kennesaw State	Western Michigan	L 6–41	9,139
New Orleans Bowl	December 23	Caesars Superdome • New Orleans, LA	ESPN	5:30 p.m.	Western Kentucky	Southern Miss	W 27–16	16,693
First Responder Bowl	December 26	Gerald J. Ford Stadium • Dallas, TX	ESPN	8:00 p.m.	FIU	UTSA	L 20–57	8,671
Independence Bowl	December 30	Independence Stadium • Shreveport, LA	ESPN	2:00 p.m.	Louisiana Tech	Coastal Carolina	W 23–14	30,298

== Records vs. other conferences ==
2025–2026 records against non-conference foes:

Regular season

Power Four Conferences	Record
ACC	0–3
Big 12	0–2
Big Ten	0–4
Notre Dame	0–0
SEC	0–5
Power 5 Total	0–14
Other FBS Conferences	Record
American	2–0
Independents (Excluding Notre Dame)	1–1
MAC	0–2
Mountain West	2–4
Pac-12	1–1
Sun Belt	3–6
Other FBS Total	9–14
FCS Opponents	Record
Football Championship Subdivision	10–1
Total Non-Conference Record	19–29

=== Conference USA vs Power 4 matchups ===
This is a list of games Conference USA has scheduled versus power conference teams (ACC, Big Ten, Big 12, Notre Dame and SEC). All rankings are from the current AP Poll at the time of the game.

Date	Conference	Visitor	Home	Site	Score
August 28	Big 12	Jacksonville State	UCF	Acrisure Bounce House • Orlando, FL	L 10–17
August 29	ACC	Kennesaw State	Wake Forest	Allegacy Federal Credit Union Stadium • Winston-Salem, NC	L 9–10
August 30	Big Ten	Missouri State	USC	Los Angeles Memorial Coliseum • Los Angeles, CA	L 13–73
September 6	Big 12	Delaware	Colorado	Folsom Field • Boulder, CO	L 7–31
September 6	Big Ten	FIU	Penn State	Beaver Stadium • University Park, PA	L 0–34
September 6	Big Ten	Kennesaw State	Indiana	Memorial Stadium • Bloomington, IN	L 9–56
September 6	SEC	Louisiana Tech	LSU	Tiger Stadium • Baton Rouge, LA	L 7–23
September 6	Big Ten	Middle Tennessee	Wisconsin	Camp Randall Stadium • Madison, WI	L 10–42
September 13	ACC	SMU	Missouri State	Robert W. Plaster Stadium • Springfield, MO	L 10–28
September 13	SEC	UTEP	Texas	Darrell K Royal–Texas Memorial Stadium • Austin, TX	L 10–27
September 20	SEC	Sam Houston	Texas	Darrell K Royal–Texas Memorial Stadium • Austin, TX	L 0–55
November 15	SEC	New Mexico State	Tennessee	Neyland Stadium • Knoxville, TN	L 9–42
November 22	ACC	Delaware	Wake Forest	Allegacy Federal Credit Union Stadium • Winston-Salem, NC	L 14–52
November 22	SEC	Western Kentucky	LSU	Tiger Stadium • Baton Rouge, LA	L 10–13

=== Conference USA vs other FBS matchups ===
The following games include Conference USA teams competing against teams from the American, MAC, Mountain West, Pac-12 or Sun Belt.

Date	Conference	Visitor	Home	Site	Score
August 29	Mountain West	UNLV	Sam Houston	Shell Energy Stadium • Houston, TX	L 21–38
August 30	Mountain West	UTEP	Utah State	Maverik Stadium • Logan, UT	L 16–28
September 6	Sun Belt	Missouri State	Marshall	Joan C. Edwards Stadium • Huntington, WV	W 21–20
September 6	American	Tulsa	New Mexico State	Aggie Memorial Stadium • Las Cruces, NM	W 21–14
September 6	Mountain West	Sam Houston	Hawaii	Clarence T. C. Ching Athletics Complex • Honolulu, HI	L 20–37
September 6	MAC	Western Kentucky	Toledo	Glass Bowl • Toledo, OH	L 21–45
September 13	American	Florida Atlantic	FIU	Pitbull Stadium • Miami, FL	W 38–28
September 13	Sun Belt	Jacksonville State	Georgia Southern	Paulson Stadium • Statesboro, GA	L 34–41
September 13	MAC	Liberty	Bowling Green	Doyt Perry Stadium • Bowling Green, OH	L 13–23
September 13	Mountain West	Middle Tennessee	Nevada	Mackay Stadium • Reno, NV	W 14–13
September 20	Sun Belt	Arkansas State	Kennesaw State	Fifth Third Stadium • Kennesaw, GA	W 28–21
September 20	Sun Belt	James Madison	Liberty	Williams Stadium • Lynchburg, VA	L 13–31
September 20	Sun Belt	Southern Miss	Louisiana Tech	Joe Aillet Stadium • Ruston, LA	W 30–20
September 20	Sun Belt	Marshall	Middle Tennessee	ohnny "Red" Floyd Stadium • Murfreesboro, TN	L 28–42
September 20	Sun Belt	Louisiana–Monroe	UTEP	Sun Bowl • El Paso, TX	L 25–31
September 20	Mountain West	Nevada	Western Kentucky	Houchens Industries–L. T. Smith Stadium • Bowling Green, KY	W 31–16
September 27	Sun Belt	Jacksonville State	Southern Miss	M. M. Roberts Stadium • Hattiesburg, MS	L 25–42
September 27	Sun Belt	Liberty	Old Dominion	S.B. Ballard Stadium • Norfolk, VA	L 7–21
September 27	Mountain West	New Mexico State	New Mexico	University Stadium • Albuquerque, NM	L 20–38
November 8	Pac-12	Sam Houston	Oregon State	Reser Stadium • Corvallis, OR	W 21–17
November 15	Pac-12	Louisiana Tech	Washington State	Martin Stadium • Pullman, WA	L 3–28

=== Conference USA vs FBS independents matchups ===
The following games include Conference USA teams competing against FBS Independents, which only includes UConn for 2025.

Date	Visitor	Home	Site	Score
September 13	UConn	Delaware	Delaware Stadium • Newark, DE	W 44–41 (OT)
October 4	FIU	UConn	Pratt & Whitney Stadium at Rentschler Field • East Hartford, CT	L 10–51

=== Conference USA vs. FCS matchups ===
The following games include Conference USA teams competing against FCS schools.

Date	Visitor	Home	Site	Score
August 28	Delaware State	Delaware	Delaware Stadium • Newark, DE	W 35–17
August 29	Bethune–Cookman	FIU	Pitbull Stadium • Miami, FL	W 42–9
August 30	Maine	Liberty	Williams Stadium • Lynchburg, VA	W 28–7
August 30	Southeastern Louisiana	Louisiana Tech	Joe Aillet Stadium • Ruston, LA	W 24–0
August 30	Austin Peay	Middle Tennessee	Johnny "Red" Floyd Stadium • Murfreesboro, TN	L 14–34
August 30	Bryant	New Mexico State	Aggie Memorial Stadium • Las Cruces, NM	W 19–3
August 30	North Alabama	Western Kentucky	Houchens Industries–L. T. Smith Stadium • Bowling Green, KY	W 55–6
September 6	UT Martin	UTEP	Sun Bowl • El Paso, TX	W 42–17
September 13	Merrimack	Kennesaw State	Fifth Third Stadium • Kennesaw, GA	W 27–13
September 20	Murray State	Jacksonville State	AmFirst Stadium • Jacksonville, AL	W 45–10
September 20	UT Martin	Missouri State	Robert W. Plaster Stadium • Springfield, MO	W 42–10

== Awards and honors ==
=== Player of the week honors ===
Week	Offensive			Defensive			Special Teams			Freshman			Offensive Line		
Week	Player	Team	Position	Player	Team	Position	Player	Team	Position	Player	Team	Position	Player	Team	Position
Week 0	Maverick McIvor	Western Kentucky	QB	Jaylen Lewis	Western Kentucky	S	Cole Maynard	Western Kentucky	P	Marvis Parrish	Western Kentucky	RB	Laurence Seymoure	Western Kentucky	OL
Week 1	Maverick McIvor (2)	Western Kentucky	QB	Mekhi Mason	Louisiana Tech	LB	John Hoyet Chance	Louisiana Tech	P	Caden Williams	Liberty	RB	Fintan Brose	Delaware	OL
Week 2	Cam Cook	Jacksonville State	RB	Kanye Young	Missouri State	LB	Garrison Rippa	Jacksonville State	K	Jeron Askren	Missouri State	TE	Bubba Grayson	Jacksonville State	RG
Week 3	Kejon Owens	FIU	RB	Juwon Gaston	Middle Tennessee	LB	John Hoyet Chance (2)	Louisiana Tech	K/P	Shamir Sterlin	FIU	DB	Steven Demboski	Delaware	OL
Week 4	Amari Odom	Kennesaw State	QB	Kolbe Fields	Louisiana Tech	LB	Kyre Duplessis	Delaware	WR/PR	Wondame Davis Jr.	UTEP	WR	J. T. Pennington	Kennesaw State	OL
Week 5	La'Vell Wright	Western Kentucky	RB	Caleb Offord	Kennesaw State	DB	John Hoyet Chance (3)	Louisiana Tech	P/K	Alonzo Jackson Jr.	Louisiana Tech	LB	Marshall Jackson	Western Kentucky	LT
Week 6	Maverick McIvor (3)	Western Kentucky	QB	Naeten Mitchell	New Mexico State	S	Ryan Hawk	New Mexico State	K	Marvis Parrish (2)	Western Kentucky	RB	Laurence Seymore (2)	Western Kentucky	LG
Week 7	Cam Cook (2)	Jacksonville State	RB	Tylon Dunlap	Kennesaw State	DL	Garrison Rippa (2)	Jacksonville State	K	Deuce Bailey	Missouri State	QB	J. T. Pennington (2)	Kennesaw State	RG
Week 8	Kejon Owens (2)	FIU	RB	Jessiah McGrew	FIU	S	Julian Gray	Liberty	RB/KR	Mac Sanders	Jacksonville State	LB	Julius Pierce	FIU	C
Week 9	Jacob Clark	Missouri State	QB	Thomas Anderson	Missouri State	CB	Koron Hayward	Western Kentucky	DE	Rodney Tisdale Jr.	Western Kentucky	QB	JaDarious Lee	Kennesaw State	LT
Week 10	Evan Dickens	Liberty	RB	Tywon Christopher	Kennesaw State	LB	Cole Maynard (2)	Western Kentucky	P	Rodney Tisdale Jr. (2)	Western Kentucky	QB	Landon Nelson	Louisiana Tech	C
Week 11	Joe Pesansky	FIU	QB	Caleb Nix	Jacksonville State	S	Nate Reed	Delaware	K	Elijah Hill	Kennesaw State	DL	Josiah Chenault	Kennesaw State	OL
Week 12	Jacob Clark (2)	Missouri State	QB	Caleb Nix (2)	Jacksonville State	S	Christian Pavon	Sam Houston	K	Roman Gagliano	Middle Tennessee	QB	Marshall Jackson (2)	Western Kentucky	LT
Week 13	Amari Odom (2)	Kennesaw State	QB	Jakari Foster	Louisiana Tech	S	David Barker	New Mexico State	K	Clayton Coppock	Kennesaw State	WR	Chad Staley	FIU	LT
Week 14	Caden Creel	Jacksonville State	QB	Baron Hopson	Kennesaw State	LB	Devin Gandy	Louisiana Tech	KR	Sterling Joseph	FIU	RB	J.T. Pennington (3)	Kennesaw State	RG

=== Conference USA Individual Awards ===
The following individuals received postseason honors as chosen by the league's head coaches.

Award	Player	School
Most Valuable Player	Cam Cook	Jacksonville State
Offensive Player of the Year	Kejon Owens	FIU
Defensive Player of the Year	Baron Hopson	Kennesaw State
Defensive Player of the Year	Jacob Fields	Louisiana Tech
Special Teams Player of the Year	Cole Maynard	Western Kentucky
Newcomer of the Year	Cam Cook	Jacksonville State
Freshman of the Year	Rodney Tisdale Jr.	Western Kentucky
Coach of the Year	Jerry Mack	Kennesaw State

=== All-Conference Teams ===
The following players were selected part of the All-Conference teams.

Position	Player	Team
First Team Offense
QB	Amari Odom	Kennesaw State
RB	Cam Cook	Jacksonville State
RB	Kejon Owens	FIU
WR	Gabriel Benyard	Kennesaw State
WR	Alex Perry	FIU
WR	Kyre Duplessis	Delaware
TE	Gavin Harris	New Mexico State
OL	Amare Grayson	Jacksonville State
OL	Fintan Brose	Delaware
OL	Brandon Best	Kennesaw State
OL	Josiah Chenault	Kennesaw State
OL	Cameron Griffin	Jacksonville State
First Team Defense
DE	Elijah Hill	Kennesaw State
DT	Damonte Smith	Middle Tennessee State
DT	Ezra Christensen	New Mexico State
DE	Emmanuel Oyebadejo	Jacksonville State
LB	Johnny Chaney Jr.	FIU
LB	Baron Hopson	Kennesaw State
LB	Micah Davey	UTEP
DB	Mister Clark	FIU
DB	Caleb Nix	Jacksonville State
DB	Jacob Fields	Louisiana Tech
DB	KT Seay	Delaware
First Team Special Teams
K	Garrison Rippa	Jacksonville State
P	Cole Maynard	Western Kentucky
KR	Devin Gandy	Louisiana Tech
PR	Gabriel Benyard	Kennesaw State
LS	Cole Marszalek	Jacksonville State

Position	Player	Team
Second Team Offense
QB	Nick Minicucci	Delaware
RB	Evan Dickens	Liberty
RB	Shomari Lawrence	Missouri State
WR	Donovan Faupel	New Mexico State
WR	Matthew Henry	Western Kentucky
WR	Kenny Odom	UTEP
TE	Eli Finley	Louisiana Tech
OL	Steven Demboski	Delaware
OL	J.T. Pennington	Kennesaw State
OL	Laurence Seymore	Western Kentucky
OL	Julius Pierce	FIU
OL	Jaheim Buchanon	FIU
Second Team Defense
DE	Keegan Davis	FIU
DT	Tylon Dunlap	Kennesaw State
DT	Talan Carter	Jacksonville State
DE	Kenton Simmons	FIU
LB	Parker Hughes	Middle Tennessee State
LB	Mekhi Mason	Louisiana Tech
LB	Walker O’Steen	Jacksonville State
DB	Jakari Foster	Louisiana Tech
DB	Jessiah McGrew	FIU
DB	Naeten Mitchell	New Mexico State
DB	Caleb Offord	Kennesaw State
Second Team Special Teams
K	Nate Reed	Delaware
P	John Hoyet Chance	Louisiana Tech
KR	Mysonne Pollard	Delaware
PR	Dash Luke	Missouri State
LS	Rex Robich	Western Kentucky

Position	Player	Team
Honorable Mention Offense
QB	Jacob Clark	Missouri State
RB	Coleman Bennett	Kennesaw State
RB	Jekail Middlebrook	Middle Tennessee State
WR	K.D. Hutchinson	Western Kentucky
WR	Sean Wilson	Delaware
WR	Deondre Johnson	Jacksonville State
TE	Jeron Askren	Missouri State
OL	Marshall Jackson	Western Kentucky
OL	Landon Nelson	Louisiana Tech
OL	Anwar O’Neal	Delaware
OL	Erick Cade	Missouri State
OL	Mark Robinson	UTEP
Honorable Mention Defense
DE	Harper Holloman	Western Kentucky
DT	KD Johnson	UTEP
DT	Adam Watkins	Kennesaw State
DE	Udoka Ezeani	UTEP
LB	Mac Sanders	Jacksonville State
LB	Gavin Moul	Delaware
LB	Derrell Farrar	Liberty
DB	Tre’Quon Fegans	Jacksonville State
DB	Shamir Sterlin	FIU
DB	Brian Blades II	FIU
DB	Jaylen Lewis	Western Kentucky
Honorable Mention Special Teams
K	Yousef Obeid	Missouri State
P	Joshua Huiet	Kennesaw State
KR	Tim Burns Jr.	Sam Houston
PR	Dedrick Latulas	Louisiana Tech
LS	Josh Hancock	UTEP

=== All-Americans ===
Position	Player	School	Selector	Unanimous	Consensus
First Team All-Americans
DB	Jakari Foster	Louisiana Tech	(AP)		
P	Cole Maynard	Western Kentucky	(AFCA, AP, CBS)		✓

Position	Player	School	Selector
Second Team All-Americans
RB	Cam Cook	Jacksonville State	(FWAA, TSN, ESPN)
DB	Jakari Foster	Louisiana Tech	(WCFF, ESPN)
OL	Laurence Seymore	Western Kentucky	(FWAA)
P	Cole Maynard	Western Kentucky	(WCFF, USAT)

== NFL draft ==
The NFL draft waa held in Pittsburgh, Pennsylvania. The following list includes all C-USA players selected in the draft.

=== List of selections ===
Player	Position	School	Draft Round	Round Pick	Overall Pick	Team
Parker Hughes	LB	Middle Tennessee	7	24	240	Jacksonville Jaguars
