= Parker Hughes =

American football player (born 2003)

No. 53 – Jacksonville Jaguars
- Position: Linebacker
- Roster status: Injured reserve

Personal information
- Born: January 2, 2003 (age 23); Elizabethton, Tennessee, U.S.
- Listed height: 6 ft 1 in (1.85 m)
- Listed weight: 228 lb (103 kg)

Career information
- High school: Elizabethton (Elizabethton, Tennessee)
- College: Middle Tennessee (2022–2025)
- NFL draft: 2026: 7th round, 240th overall pick

Career history
- Jacksonville Jaguars (2026–present)

Awards and highlights
- Second-team All-Conference USA (2025)
- Stats at Pro Football Reference

Troy Parker Hughes (born January 2, 2003) is an American professional football linebacker for the Jacksonville Jaguars of the National Football League (NFL). He played college football for the Middle Tennessee Blue Raiders and was selected by the Jaguars in the seventh round of the 2026 NFL draft.

== Early life ==
Hughes attended Elizabethton High School in Elizabethton, Tennessee. He helped lead the team to two TSSAA BlueCross Bowl state titles and earned Class 4A Mr. Football honors in his senior season. Hughes received little collegiate recruiting attention and walked on to the football team at Middle Tennessee.

== College career ==
Hughes played in four games in his freshman season before taking a redshirt. He transferred to Samford and was moved to outside linebacker. Hughes felt it was not a good fit and considered dropping football altogether after a season at Samford, but ultimately opted to transfer back to Middle Tennessee. As a redshirt sophomore in 2023, he had 53 tackles, including 7.0 tackles for loss and 2.5 sacks, starting 11 games. Hughes missed three games in 2024 after sustaining an injury over the summer but finished with 69 tackles with 2.5 tackles for loss, a hurry and a forced fumble. In 2025, Hughes recorded 100 tackles (three for loss), two interceptions, two pass breakups and two hurries. He was named to the Second Team All-Conference USA.

== Professional career ==
Pre-draft measurables
Height	Weight	Arm length	Hand span	Wingspan	40-yard dash	10-yard split	20-yard split	20-yard shuttle	Three-cone drill	Vertical jump	Broad jump	Bench press
6 ft 0 3/4 in (1.85 m)	228 lb (103 kg)	31 3/8 in (0.80 m)	8 7/8 in (0.23 m)	6 ft 2 1/4 in (1.89 m)	4.39 s	1.53 s	2.59 s	4.41 s	7.51 s	35.5 in (0.90 m)	9 ft 6 in (2.90 m)	25 reps
All values from Pro Day

Hughes was selected in the seventh round of the 2026 NFL draft with the 240th overall pick by the Jacksonville Jaguars. On August 17, 2026, Hughes was placed on injured reserve, ending his season.
