= Kyre Duplessis =

American football player (born 2002)

Profile
- Position: Wide receiver

Personal information
- Born: July 18, 2002 (age 24)
- Listed height: 5 ft 11 in (1.80 m)
- Listed weight: 193 lb (88 kg)

Career information
- High school: Woodbridge (Woodbridge, Virginia)
- College: Coastal Carolina (2020–2024); Delaware (2025)
- NFL draft: 2026: undrafted

Career history
- Detroit Lions (2026)*; Seattle Seahawks (2026)*; Denver Broncos (2026)*
- * Offseason or practice squad member only

Awards and highlights
- First-team All-CUSA (2025)

Kyre Duplessis (born July 18, 2002) is an American professional football wide receiver. He played college football for the Coastal Carolina Chanticleers and Delaware Fightin' Blue Hens and was signed by the Detroit Lions as an undrafted free agent in 2026.

== Early life ==
Duplessis attended Woodbridge High School in Woodbridge, Virginia. He committed to play college football for the Coastal Carolina Chanticleers as a walk-on.

== College career ==
In five years as a Chanticleer from 2020 to 2024, Duplessis caught 23 passes for 348 yards and a touchdown in 37 games played. After the 2024 season, he entered the NCAA transfer portal.

Duplessis transferred to play for the Delaware Fightin' Blue Hens. He finished the 2025 season with 60 receptions for 824 yards and five touchdowns, while also returning a punt for a touchdown. For his performance, Duplessis was named first-team all-Conference USA.

== Professional career ==
=== Detroit Lions ===
After going undrafted in the 2026 NFL draft, Duplessis signed with the Detroit Lions as an undrafted free agent. On June 20, 2026, he was waived.

=== Seattle Seahawks ===
On July 29, 2026, Duplessis signed with the Seattle Seahawks. On August 4, he was waived after the team signed Garrett Nelson.

=== Denver Broncos ===
On August 7, 2026, Duplessis signed with the Denver Broncos. On August 26, he was waived by the Broncos.
