= Charles Kelly (American football) =

American football player and coach (born 1967)

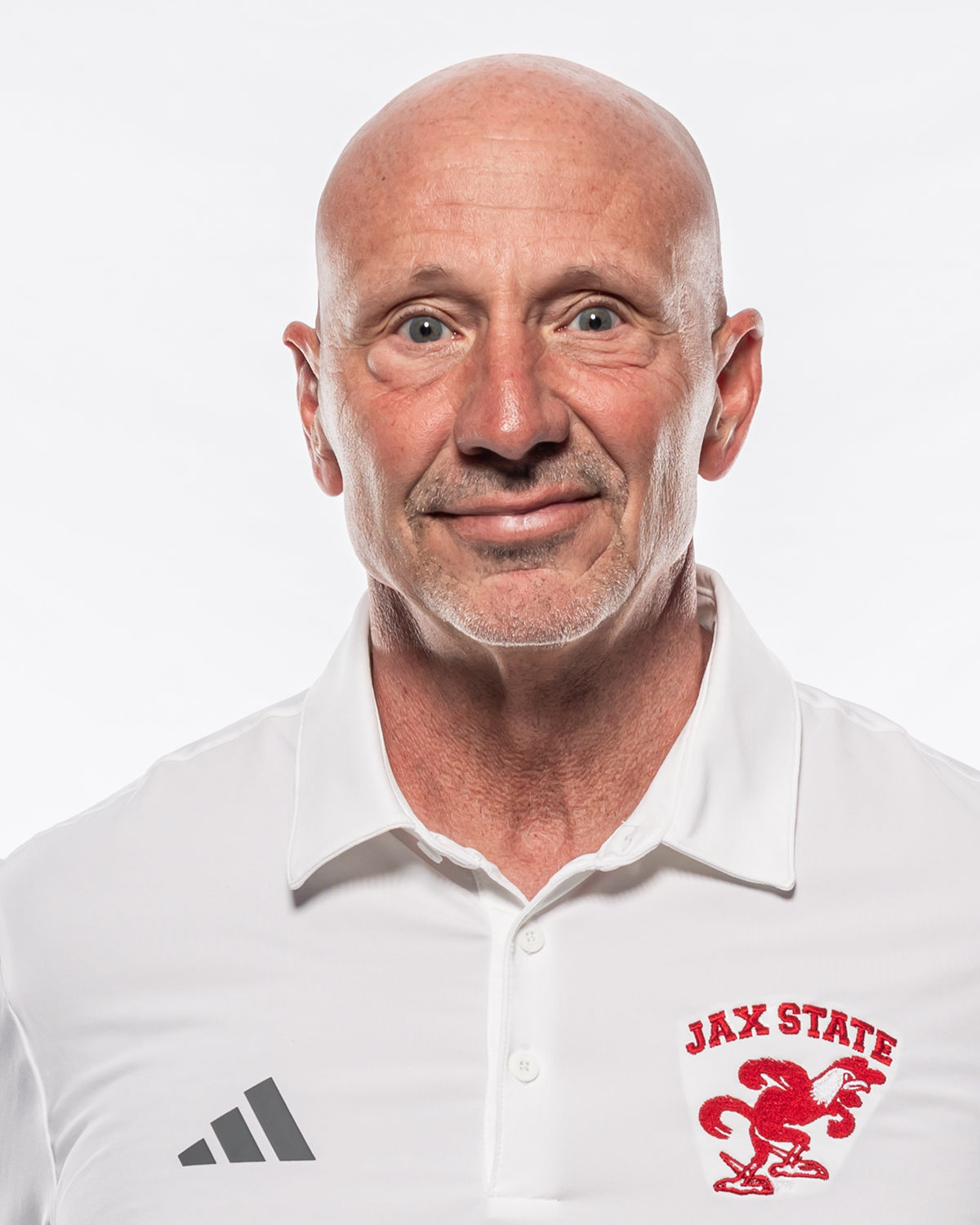
- Kelly in 2025

Current position
- Title: Head coach
- Team: Jacksonville State
- Conference: CUSA
- Record: 17–8

Biographical details
- Born: September 8, 1967 (age 59); Dothan, Alabama, U.S.

Playing career
- 1986–1989: Auburn
- Position: Defensive back

Coaching career (HC unless noted)
- 1990–1992: Central HS (AL) (assistant)
- 1993: Auburn (GA)
- 1994: Jacksonville State (RB)
- 1995: Jacksonville State (DB)
- 1996: Jacksonville State (OC)
- 1997–1998: Jacksonville State (DC)
- 1999: Henderson State (DC)
- 2000–2001: Eufaula HS (AL) (DC/LB)
- 2002–2003: Nicholls State (DB)
- 2004–2005: Nicholls State (DC)
- 2006–2007: Georgia Tech (ST)
- 2008–2009: Georgia Tech (CB)
- 2010–2012: Georgia Tech (DB)
- 2012: Georgia Tech (interim DC)
- 2013: Florida State (ST/LB)
- 2014–2017: Florida State (DC)
- 2018: Tennessee (ST/S)
- 2019–2022: Alabama (asst. DC/S)
- 2023: Colorado (DC/S)
- 2024: Auburn (co-DC/S)
- 2025–present: Jacksonville State

Head coaching record
- Overall: 17–8
- Bowls: 1-0

Charles Kelly (born September 8, 1967) is an American football coach and former football player. He is currently the head coach at Jacksonville State University. Kelly won a national championship as a member of the Florida State Seminoles coaching staff during the 2013 college football season. He also won a College Football Playoff National Championship as the co-defensive coordinator of the 2020 Alabama Crimson Tide who went undefeated.

== Playing career ==
Kelly played college football at Auburn as a defensive back from 1986 to 1989.

== Coaching career ==
=== High school career ===
Kelly began his coaching career as an assistant at Central High School in Phenix City, Alabama, from 1990 to 1992 and he was also defensive coordinator and linebackers coach at Eufaula High School in Eufaula, Alabama, from 2000 to 2001.

=== College career ===
Kelly first coached in college as a graduate assistant at his alma mater, Auburn University in 1993. Starting in 1994, Kelly moved to Jacksonville State University as running backs coach and then moved to secondary coach for the 1995 season. In 1996, Kelly was promoted to his first coordinator position as offensive coordinator at Jacksonville State. For the 1997 season, he moved to defensive coordinator and remained in that position through 1998. In 1999, he became defensive coordinator at Henderson State University. In 2002, Kelly moved to Nicholls State University as secondary coach and stayed in that position through the 2003 season. In 2004, Kelly was promoted to defensive coordinator at Nicholls State and remained in that role through the 2005 season.

In 2006, Kelly moved to the Georgia Tech and became special teams coordinator through 2007. From the 2008 season through the 2009 season, he was cornerbacks coach at Georgia Tech. In 2010, he moved to defensive secondary coach and started the 2012 season in that position before being promoted to interim defensive coordinator during the season. Kelly took over the defense after a 2–4 start (1-3 in the ACC), helping the Yellow Jackets improve greatly in every defensive statistical category. Georgia Tech went on to finish the season with a 7–7 record and defeated USC 21–7 in the Hyundai Sun Bowl.

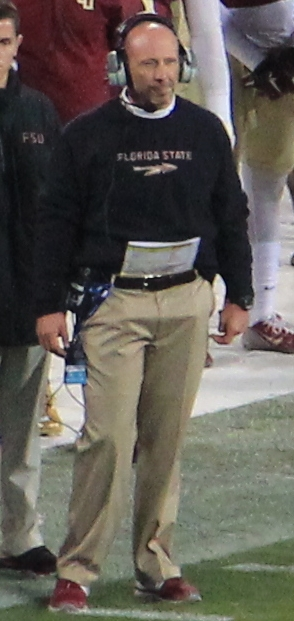
Kelly coaching for Florida State in 2014

For the 2013 season, Kelly moved to Florida State University as linebackers coach and special teams coordinator and helped the Seminoles win their third national championship. In 2014, Kelly became the defensive coordinator at Florida State and remained in that position through the 2017 season.

In 2018, Kelly moved to the University of Tennessee as the special teams coordinator and safeties coach. In 2019, he moved to the University of Alabama as the associate defensive coordinator and safeties coach.

On December 7, 2022, Kelly was hired as defensive coordinator at Colorado under the newly hired head coach Deion Sanders.

=== Jacksonville State ===
On December 20, 2024, Kelly was named head coach at Jacksonville State.

== Head coaching record ==
Year	Team	Overall	Conference	Standing	Bowl/playoffs
Jacksonville State Gamecocks (Conference USA) (2025–present)
2025	Jacksonville State	9–5	7–1	T–1st	W Salute to Veterans
2026	Jacksonville State	8–3	6–1		
Jacksonville State:		17–8	13–2		
Total:		17–8			
