= Brian Williams (American football coach) =

American football coach

Current position
- Title: Defensive coordinator
- Team: Jacksonville State
- Conference: CUSA

Biographical details
- Born: Miami, Florida, U.S.

Playing career
- ?: Albany State
- ?: Florida A&M

Coaching career (HC unless noted)
- 1999–2001: Rickards HS (FL) (DC)
- 2002–2008: Miami Carol City HS (FL) (DC)
- 2009: Northeast HS (GA) (DC)
- 2010–2012: Amos P. Godby HS (FL) (DC)
- 2013–2014: Florida State (defensive analyst)
- 2015: Georgia (player relations director)
- 2016–2018: UAB (LB)
- 2019: Maryland (OLB)
- 2020: Maryland (DL)
- 2021: Maryland (co-DC/DL)
- 2022–2024: Maryland (DC/DL)
- 2025–present: Jacksonville State (DC)

Brian C. Williams (born in Miami) is an American football coach who is the defensive coordinator and defensive line coach for the Jacksonville State.

== College career ==
Williams started his career at Albany State earning a scholarship before transferring to Florida A&M.

== Coaching career ==
Williams took his first coaching job at Rickards High School in Tallahassee, Florida, as the defensive coordinator for three years. He then returned to his former high school as the defensive coordinator for Miami Carol City High School where he would stay for seven years. Williams' next stop would come as a defensive coordinator for one year at Northeast High School. Williams would the get his final high school coaching job as the defensive coordinator for Godby High School for three years. Williams would then get his first college coaching job as a defensive analyst for Florida State where he would win a national championship and coach at for two years. He would then head to Georgia as the Player Relations Director for one year. Williams would then get his first collegiate position coaching job as the linebackers coach for UAB. Williams would then by hired by the outside linebackers coach at Maryland. Then after one year as the outside linebackers coach for Maryland, Williams would become the defensive line coach. Williams would then get promoted to be the team's co-defensive coordinator. William's would then be promoted again after one year, this time being promoted as the team's full-time defensive coordinator. On February 14, 2025 Williams accepted a job in Jacksonville State to become their new defensive coordinator.
