= 2025 Jacksonville State Gamecocks football team =

American college football season

2025 Jacksonville State Gamecocks football

Salute to Veterans Bowl champion

C-USA Championship, L 15–19 Kennesaw State

Salute to Veterans Bowl, W 17–13 vs. Troy
- Conference: Conference USA
- Record: 9–5 (7–1 CUSA)
- Head coach: Charles Kelly (1st season)
- Offensive coordinator: Clint Trickett (1st season)
- Offensive scheme: Multiple
- Defensive coordinator: Brian Williams (1st season)
- Base defense: 4–3
- Home stadium: AmFirst Stadium

2025 Conference USA football standings
	Conf.			Overall
Team	W		L	W		L
Kennesaw State y$	7	–	1	10	–	4
Jacksonville State y	7	–	1	9	–	5
Western Kentucky	6	–	2	9	–	4
Louisiana Tech	5	–	3	8	–	5
FIU	5	–	3	7	–	6
Missouri State	5	–	3	7	–	6
Delaware	4	–	4	7	–	6
Liberty	3	–	5	4	–	8
New Mexico State	2	–	6	4	–	8
Middle Tennessee	2	–	6	3	–	9
Sam Houston	1	–	7	2	–	10
UTEP	1	–	7	2	–	10
Championship: Kennesaw State 19, Jacksonville State 15
$ – Conference champion; y – Championship game participant

The 2025 Jacksonville State Gamecocks football team represented Jacksonville State University in Conference USA (CUSA) during the 2025 NCAA Division I FBS football season. The Gamecocks were led by Charles Kelly in his first year as the head coach. The Gamecocks played their home games at AmFirst Stadium, located in Jacksonville, Alabama.

== Offseason ==
=== Transfers ===
==== Outgoing ====
Player	Position	Destination
Te'Sean Smoot	QB	Alabama State
Daveion Harley	IOL	California
Reginald Hughes	LB	Colorado
Tar'Varish Dawson	WR	FIU
Austin Ambush	S	Georgia State
Zedric Washington	LB	Hinds CC
Jabari Mack	DB	Louisville
Jibreel Al-Amin	LB	Marshall
Demarcus Lacey	WR	Marshall
Zion Turner	QB	Marshall
Zechariah Poyser	S	Miami (FL)
Ky'won McCray	LB	New Mexico
Will O'Steen	OT	North Carolina
Fred Davis II	DB	Northwestern
Jamal Siler	OL	South Alabama
Mike Franklin	RB	Southern
K.D. Arnold	OL	UCLA
Jarod Bowie	WR	West Virginia
Jacob Barrick	TE	West Virginia
Cam Vaughn	WR	West Virginia
Fred Perry	S	West Virginia
Derek Carter	DB	West Virginia
Jordan McCants	WR	West Virginia
Anthony Benjamin	WR	Western Carolina
Geimere Latimer	DB	Wisconsin
Tee Denson	DB	Unknown
Jaleel Birdsong	LB	Unknown
Kevin Ellis	DL	Unknown
Anwar Lewis	RB	Unknown
Collin Westfelt	LS	Withdrawn
Jackson Veasy	DL	Withdrawn

==== Incoming ====
Player	Position	Previous school
Franklin Baret Jr.	WR	Appalachian State
Cole Marszalek	LS	Arizona State
Rod Elston	S	Auburn
Dylan Gentry	WR	Auburn
Myles Butler	LB	Campbellsville
Caleb Nix	S	Clemson
Trevor Woods	S	Colorado
Jaheim Jenkins	S	Eastern Michigan
Jacarvis Alexandre	CB	Ferris State
Kam Bell	TE	Florida Atlantic
Caleb Cooms	WR	Florida Atlantic
Isaac Walker	EDGE	Georgia Southern
Jacob Cruz	DL	Georgia Tech
Jeremiah Orr	OT	Hampton
Gavin Wimsatt	QB	Kentucky
Cade Cunningham	QB	Memphis
Tyrin Taylor	DB	Memphis
Larry Preston	DB	Murray State
Deondre Johnson	WR	Rutgers
Cam Cook	RB	TCU
Adrian Gumm	IOL	Tusculum
Tre'quon Fegans	CB	UCF
Harrison Hamsley	TE	Valdosta State
Khurtiss Perry	DL	Virginia Tech

=== Coaching staff additions ===
Name	New Position	Previous Team	Previous Position	Source
Charles Kelly	Head coach	Auburn	Co-defensive coordinator/Safeties	
Clint Trickett	Offensive coordinator	Georgia Southern	Tight ends/Pass game coordinator	
Brian Williams	Defensive coordinator	Maryland	Defensive coordinator/defensive line coach	
Deshaun Davis	Linebackers	North Alabama	Linebackers	
Max Thurmond	Special teams/Running backs	Tennessee	Senior offensive analyst	
Lawrence Dawsey	Wide receivers	Appalachian State	Wide receivers	
Rohan Gaines	Defensive backs	Auburn	Defensive analyst	
Taylor Housewright	Tight ends	Georgia Southern	Senior offensive analyst	
Xavier Garcia	Defensive line	Georgia Tech	Defensive assistant	
Bert Biffani	Outside linebackers/Recruiting coordinator	Pell City High School	Defensive coordinator	

== Schedule ==
Date	Time	Opponent	Site	TV	Result	Attendance
August 28	6:00 p.m.	at UCF*	Acrisure Bounce House; Orlando, FL	ESPN+	L 10–17	43,043
September 6	11:00 a.m.	Liberty	AmFirst Stadium; Jacksonville, AL	CBSSN	W 34–24	20,755
September 13	6:00 p.m.	at Georgia Southern*	Paulson Stadium; Statesboro, GA	ESPN+	L 34–41	24,585
September 20	6:00 p.m.	Murray State*^{†}	AmFirst Stadium; Jacksonville, AL	ESPN+	W 45–10	21,426
September 27	6:00 p.m.	at Southern Miss*	M. M. Roberts Stadium; Hattiesburg, MS	ESPN+	L 25–42	25,034
October 9	7:00 p.m.	at Sam Houston	Shell Energy Stadium; Houston, TX	CBSSN	W 29–27	5,419
October 15	6:00 p.m.	Delaware	AmFirst Stadium; Jacksonville, AL	ESPN	W 38–25	16,884
October 29	6:30 p.m.	at Middle Tennessee	Johnny "Red" Floyd Stadium; Murfreesboro, TN	ESPN2	W 24–21	10,200
November 8	2:00 p.m.	at UTEP	Sun Bowl; El Paso, TX	ESPN+	W 30–27	9,536
November 15	7:00 p.m.	Kennesaw State	AmFirst Stadium; Jacksonville, AL	ESPNU	W 35–26	24,166
November 22	2:30 p.m.	at FIU	Pitbull Stadium; Miami, FL	CBSSN	L 21–27	9,504
November 29	1:00 p.m.	Western Kentucky	AmFirst Stadium; Jacksonville, AL	ESPN+	W 37–34	16,733
December 5	6:00 p.m.	Kennesaw State	AmFirst Stadium; Jacksonville, AL (C-USA Championship Game)	CBSSN	L 15–19	18,142
December 16	8:00 p.m.	vs. Troy	Cramton Bowl; Montgomery, AL (Salute to Veterans Bowl, rivalry)	ESPN	W 17–13	15,721
*Non-conference game; ^{†}Homecoming; All times are in Central time

== Game summaries ==
=== at UCF ===
Game One – Jacksonville State Gamecocks (0–0) at UCF Knights (0–0) – Game summary

Quarter	1	2	3	4	Total
Gamecocks	0	0	3	7	10
Knights	0	0	3	14	17

at Acrisure Bounce House • Orlando, FL

- Date: Thursday August 28, 2025
- Game time: 6:00 p.m.
- Game weather: Rain, 81 °F (27 °C)
- Game attendance: 43,043
- Referee: Kevin Boitmann
- TV announcers (ESPN+): A. J. Ricketts (play-by-play) and Rene Ingoglia (analyst)

Game information

First quarter

- No scoring plays.

Second quarter

- No scoring plays.

Third quarter

- UCF – Anthony Venneri 24-yard field goal, 8:03. Knights 3–0. Drive: 7 plays, 73 yards, 3:06.
- JVST – Garrison Rippa 42-yard field goal, 5:28. Tied 3–3. Drive: 9 plays, 50 yards, 2:35.

Fourth quarter

- JVST – Andrew Paul 10-yard run (Garrison Rippa kick), 12:01. Gamecocks 10–3. Drive: 11 plays, 84 yards, 5:17.
- UCF – Dylan Wade 39-yard pass from Tayven Jackson (Anthony Venneri kick), 9:30. Tied 10–10. Drive: 7 plays, 76 yards, 2:25.
- UCF – DJ Black 33-yard pass from Tayven Jackson (Anthony Venneri kick), 1:03. Knights 17–10. Drive: 6 plays, 64 yards, 0:32.

Statistics	JVST	UCF
First downs	18	23
Plays–yards	69–322	70–422
Rushes–yards	39–165	37–108
Passing yards	157	314
Passing: Comp–Att–Int	16-30-1	22-33-0
Turnovers	1	1
Time of possession	28:04	31:56

Team	Category	Player	Statistics
Jacksonville State	Passing	Gavin Wimsatt	15/29, 139 yards, INT
Jacksonville State	Rushing	Cam Cook	17 carries, 75 yards
Jacksonville State	Receiving	Cam Cook	4 receptions, 43 yards
UCF	Passing	Tayven Jackson	17/24, 282 yards, 2 TD
UCF	Rushing	Myles Montgomery	21 carries, 79 yards
UCF	Receiving	Myles Montgomery	3 receptions, 71 yards

=== vs. Liberty ===
Game Two – Liberty Flames (1–0) at Jacksonville State Gamecocks (0–1) – Game summary

Quarter	1	2	3	4	Total
Flames	7	3	0	14	24
Gamecocks	7	10	7	10	34

at AmFirst Stadium • Jacksonville, AL

- Date: Saturday September 6, 2025
- Game time: 11:00 a.m.
- Game attendance: 20,755
- Referee: Rodney Burnette
- TV announcers (CBSSN): Jordan Kent (play-by-play) and Adam Breneman (analyst)

Game information

First quarter

- JVST – Andrew Paul 3-yard run (Garrison Rippa kick), 9:58. Gamecocks 7–0. Drive: 4 plays, 40 yards, 1:43.
- LIB – Julian Gray 72-yard pass from Ethan Vasko (Jay Billingsley kick), 4:09. Tied 7–7. Drive: 5 plays, 95 yards, 2:47.

Second quarter

- JVST – Cam Cook 11-yard run (Garrison Rippa kick), 12:35. Gamecocks 14–7. Drive: 6 plays, 53 yards, 2:25.
- JVST – Garrison Rippa 50-yard field goal, 3:08. Gamecocks 17–7. Drive: 11 plays, 33 yards, 5:12.
- LIB – Jay Billingsley 35-yard field goal, 0:00. Gamecocks 17–10. Drive: 11 plays, 69 yards, 3:02.

Third quarter

- JVST – Cam Cook 1-yard run (Garrison Rippa kick), 7:13. Gamecocks 24–10. Drive: 8 plays, 83 yards, 3:49.

Fourth quarter

- LIB – Evan Dickens 52-yard run (Jay Billingsley kick), 12:47. Gamecocks 24–17. Drive: 3 plays, 72 yards, 1:28.
- JVST – Gavin Wimsatt 3-yard run (Garrison Rippa kick), 8:33. Gamecocks 31–17. Drive: 10 plays, 75 yards, 4:14.
- LIB – Donte Lee Jr. 62-yard pass from Ethan Vasko (Brayden Beck kick), 7:16. Gamecocks 31–24. Drive: 3 plays, 82 yards, 1:11.
- JVST – Garrison Rippa 24-yard field goal, 4:08. Gamecocks 34–24. Drive: 7 plays, 58 yards, 3:08.

Statistics	LIB	JVST
First downs	20	18
Plays–yards	66–534	62–390
Rushes–yards	37–199	50–338
Passing yards	335	52
Passing: Comp–Att–Int	19–29–1	6–12–0
Turnovers	2	0
Time of possession	29:36	30:24

Team	Category	Player	Statistics
Liberty	Passing	Ethan Vasko	19/29, 335 yards, 2 TD, INT
Liberty	Rushing	Evan Dickens	13 carries, 114 yards, TD
Liberty	Receiving	Donte Lee Jr.	2 receptions, 74 yards, TD
Jacksonville State	Passing	Gavin Wimsatt	6/12, 52 yards
Jacksonville State	Rushing	Cam Cook	29 carries, 195 yards, 2 TD
Jacksonville State	Receiving	Caleb Coombs	2 receptions, 24 yards

=== at Georgia Southern ===
Game Three – Jacksonville State Gamecocks (1–1) at Georgia Southern Eagles (0–2) – Game summary

Quarter	1	2	3	4	Total
Gamecocks	14	10	10	0	34
Eagles	17	14	0	10	41

at Paulson Stadium • Statesboro, GA

- Date: Saturday September 13, 2025
- Game time: 6:00 p.m. CDT
- Game weather: Sunny • Temperature: 78 °F (26 °C)
- Game attendance: 24,585
- Referee: Trennis Livingston
- TV announcers (ESPN+): Danny Waugh (play-by-play), Jayson Foster (analyst) and Whitney Haworth (sideline)

Game information

First quarter

- (11:04) GASO – JC French IV 2-yard run, Tripp Bryant kick (Drive: 9 plays, 60 yards, 3:48; Georgia Southern 7–0)
- (6:34) JVST - Gavin Wimsatt 10-yard run, Garrison Rippa kick (Drive: 10 plays, 75 yards, 4:30; Tied 7-7)
- (6:22) GASO - Dalen Cobb 95-yard kickoff return, Tripp Bryant kick (Georgia Southern 14-7)
- (3:42) JVST - Brock Rechsteiner 56-yard pass from Gavin Wimsett, Garrison Rippa kick (Drive: 6 plays, 75 yards, 2:40; Tied 14-14)
- (1:44) GASO - Tripp Bryant 37-yard field goal (Drive: 7 plays, 15 yards, 1:49; Georgia Southern 17-14)

Second quarter

- (14:56) GASO - Camden Brown 18-yard pass from JC French IV, Tripp Bryant kick (Drive: 5 plays, 39 yards, 1:41; Georgia Southern 24-14)
- (10:38) JVST - Garrison Rippa 30-yard field goal (Drive: 9 plays, 62 yards, 4:18; Georgia Southern 24-17)
- (5:54) GASO - OJ Arnold 32-yard run, Tripp Bryant kick (Drive: 9 plays, 75 yards, 4:44; Georgia Southern 31-17)
- (0:24) JVST - Gavin Wimsatt 6-yard run, Garrison Rippa kick (Drive: 11 plays, 66 yards, 2:33; Georgia Southern 31-24')

Third quarter

- (9:34) JVST - Garrison Rippa 33-yard field goal (Drive: 11 plays, 49 yards, 5:26; Georgia Southern 31-27)
- (0:22) JVST - Brock Rechsteiner 13-yard run, Garrison Rippa kick (Drive: 7 plays, 42 yards, 2:55; Jacksonville State 34-31)

Fourth quarter

- (11:19) GASO - Tripp Bryant 43-yard field goal (Drive: 11 plays, 51 yards, 3:57; Tied 34-34)
- (6:23) GASO - OJ Arnold 6-yard run, Tripp Bryant kick (Drive: 6 plays, 65 yards, 3:33; Georgia Southern 41-34')

Statistics	JVST	GASO
First downs	22	24
Plays–yards	67–396	66–410
Rushes–yards	42–213	42–219
Passing yards	183	191
Passing: Comp–Att–Int	17–25–1	16–24–0
Turnovers	1	1
Time of possession	30:30	29:30

Team	Category	Player	Statistics
Jacksonville State	Passing	Gavin Wimsatt	16/24, 178 yards, TD, INT
Jacksonville State	Rushing	Cam Cook	21 carries, 120 yards
Jacksonville State	Receiving	Brock Rechsteiner	4 receptions, 69 yards, TD
Georgia Southern	Passing	JC French IV	16/24, 191 yards, TD
Georgia Southern	Rushing	OJ Arnold	16 carries, 128 yards, 2 TDs
Georgia Southern	Receiving	Dalen Cobb	6 receptions, 70 yards

=== vs. Murray State (FCS) ===
Game Four – Murray State Racers (FCS) (0–3) at Jacksonville State Gamecocks (1–2) – Game summary

Quarter	1	2	3	4	Total
Racers (FCS)	3	0	7	0	10
Gamecocks	7	17	14	7	45

at AmFirst Stadium • Jacksonville, AL

- Date: Saturday September 20, 2025
- Game time: 6:00 p.m.
- Game attendance: 21,426
- Referee: Ron Hudson
- TV announcers (ESPN+): Eli Gold (play-by-play), Mickey Shadrix (analyst) and Taylor Korn (sideline)

Game information

First quarter

- MUR – Jack Tannehill 43-yard field goal, 3:54. Racers 3–0. Drive: 7 plays, 29 yards, 1:40.
- JVST – Brock Rechsteiner 17-yard pass from Gavin Wimsatt (Garrison Rippa kick), 1:32. Gamecocks 7–3. Drive: 7 plays, 75 yards, 2:22.

Second quarter

- JVST – Garrison Rippa 27-yard field goal, 11:02. Gamecocks 10–3. Drive: 12 plays, 63 yards, 3:50.
- JVST – Cam Cook 4-yard run (Garrison Rippa kick), 1:25. Gamecocks 17–3. Drive: 10 plays, 69 yards, 4:31.
- JVST – Gavin Wimsatt 28-yard run (Garrison Rippa kick), 0:13. Gamecocks 24–3. Drive: 4 plays, 43 yards, 0:40.

Third quarter

- MUR – Conlee Crossno 0-yard fumble return (Jack Tannehill kick), 9:46. Gamecocks 24–10.
- JVST – Cam Cook 11-yard run (Garrison Rippa kick), 6:08. Gamecocks 31–10. Drive: 9 plays, 84 yards, 3:37.
- JVST – Khristian Lando 5-yard run (Garrison Rippa kick), 0:06. Gamecocks 38–10. Drive: 10 plays, 72 yards, 4:27.

Fourth quarter

- JVST – Caden Creel 13-yard run (Conor Donaghy kick), 1:15. Gamecocks 45–10. Drive: 7 plays, 72 yards, 2:36.

Statistics	MUR	JVST
First downs	16	29
Plays–yards	68–233	79–531
Rushes–yards	35–92	45–329
Passing yards	141	202
Passing: Comp–Att–Int	21–33–2	19–34–0
Turnovers	2	1
Time of possession	29:28	30:32

Team	Category	Player	Statistics
Murray State	Passing	Jim Ogle	17/27, 130 yards, 2 INT
Murray State	Rushing	Jawaun Northington	12 carries, 44 yards
Murray State	Receiving	Lucas Desjardins	2 receptions, 33 yards
Jacksonville State	Passing	Gavin Wimsatt	17/31, 188 yards, TD
Jacksonville State	Rushing	Cam Cook	22 carries, 147 yards, 2 TD
Jacksonville State	Receiving	Brock Rechsteiner	5 receptions, 89 yards, TD

=== at Southern Miss ===
Game Five – Jacksonville State Gamecocks (2–2) at Southern Miss Golden Eagles (2–2) – Game summary

Quarter	1	2	3	4	Total
Gamecocks	3	0	8	14	25
Golden Eagles	14	7	14	7	42

at M. M. Roberts Stadium • Hattiesburg, MS

- Date: Saturday September 27, 2025
- Game time: 6:00 p.m. CDT
- Game weather: Sunny • Temperature: 83 °F (28 °C) • Wind: 4 mph
- Game attendance: 25,034
- Referee: Reed Brotherton
- TV announcers (ESPN+): Jason Baker (play-by-play) and Austin Davis (analyst)

Game information

First quarter

- (11:14) USM – Jeffery Pittman 1-yard run, Creighton Wilbanks kick (Drive: 4 plays, 25 yards, 1:31; Southern Miss 7–0)
- (6:38) USM – Jeffery Pittman 3-yard run, Creighton Wilbanks kick (Drive: 4 plays, 80 yards, 1:17; Southern Miss 14–0)
- (0:45) JVST – Garrison Rippa 35-yard field goal (Drive: 15 plays, 57 yards, 5:53; Southern Miss 14–3)

Second quarter

- (0:05) USM – Braylon Braxton 6-yard run, Creighton Wilbanks kick (Drive: 11 plays, 48 yards, 1:50; Southern Miss 21–3)

Third quarter

- (5:52) USM – Kadinn Morris 6-yard pass from Braylon Braxton, Creighton Wilbanks kick (Drive: 7 plays, 67 yards, 3:30; Southern Miss 28–3)
- (4:33) JVST – Brock Rechsteiner 4-yard pass from Caden Creel, Caden Creel two-point conversion run (Drive: 3 plays, 75 yards, 1:19; Southern Miss 28–11)
- (1:55) USM – Carl Chester 13-yard pass from Braylon Braxton, Creighton Wilbanks kick (Drive: 6 plays, 75 yards, 2:38; Southern Miss 35–11)

Fourth quarter

- (7:23) JVST – Caden Creel 5-yard run, two-point conversion run attempt failed (Drive: 14 plays, 89 yards, 6:20; Southern Miss 35–17)
- (1:27) USM – Ian Foster 49-yard interception return, Creighton Wilbanks kick (Drive: 2 plays, -3 yards, 0:33; Southern Miss 42–17)
- (0:23) JVST – Cam Cook 8-yard run, Caden Creel two-point conversion run (Drive: 5 plays, 75 yards, 1:04; Southern Miss 42–25)

Statistics	JVST	USM
First downs	21	25
Plays–yards	79–390	72–377
Rushes–yards	54–262	50–225
Passing yards	128	152
Passing: Comp–Att–Int	13–25–2	13–22–0
Turnovers	4	1
Time of possession	30:58	29:02

Team	Category	Player	Statistics
Jacksonville State	Passing	Caden Creel	9/17, 109 yards, TD, 2 INT
Jacksonville State	Rushing	Caden Creel	23 carries, 161 yards, TD
Jacksonville State	Receiving	Cam Cook	4 receptions, 77 yards
Southern Miss	Passing	Braylon Braxton	13/22, 152 yards, 2 TD
Southern Miss	Rushing	Jeffery Pittman	18 carries, 80 yards, 2 TD
Southern Miss	Receiving	Tychaun Chapman	1 reception, 43 yards

=== at Sam Houston ===
Game Six – Jacksonville State Gamecocks (2–3) at Sam Houston Bearkats (0–5) – Game summary

Quarter	1	2	3	4	Total
Gamecocks	7	10	0	12	29
Bearkats	0	14	7	6	27

at Bowers Stadium • Huntsville, TX

- Date: Thursday October 9, 2025
- Game time: 7:00 p.m. CDT
- Game weather: Sunny • Temperature: 85 °F (29 °C) • Wind: NE 10 mph
- Game attendance: 5,419
- Referee: Douglas Mercer
- TV announcers (CBSSN): Jack Gordon (play-by-play) and Taylor McHargue (analyst)

Game information

First quarter

- (8:57) JVST – Caden Creel 7-yard run, Garrison Rippa kick (Drive: 10 plays, 59 yards, 4:35; Jacksonville State 7–0)

Second quarter

- (14:01) JVST – Garrison Rippa 30-yard field goal (Drive: 5 plays, 77 yards, 1:05; Jacksonville State 10–0)
- (10:13) SHSU – Landan Brown 1-yard run, Christian Pavon kick (Drive: 1 play, 1 yard, 0:04; Jacksonville State 10–7)
- (6:15) JVST – Cam Cook 2-yard run, Garrison Rippa kick (Drive: 8 plays, 75 yards, 3:58; Jacksonville State 17–7)
- (4:28) SHSU – Qua'Vez Humphreys 4-yard pass from Hunter Watson, Christian Pavon kick (Drive: 4 plays, 75 yards, 1:47; Jacksonville State 17–14)

Third quarter

- (8:46) SHSU – Chris Reed 20-yard pass from Hunter Watson, Christian Pavon kick (Drive: 8 plays, 80 yards, 3:48; Sam Houston 21–17)

Fourth quarter

- (14:56) JVST – Garrison Rippa 26-yard field goal (Drive: 8 plays, 40 yards, 4:10; Sam Houston 21–20)
- (10:34) JVST – Cam Cook 7-yard run (Drive: 5 plays, 52 yards, 2:26; Jacksonville State 26–21)
- (0:52) SHSU – Chris Reed 19-yard pass from Hunter Watson (Drive: 8 plays, 59 yards, 4:03; Sam Houston 27–26)
- (0:00) JVST – Garrison Rippa 52-yard field goal (Drive: 7 plays, 48 yards, 0:47; Jacksonville State 29–27)

Statistics	JVST	SHSU
First downs	26	15
Plays–yards	80–499	52–286
Rushes–yards	63–370	33–150
Passing yards	129	136
Passing: Comp–Att–Int	13–17–0	12–19–0
Turnovers	1	1
Time of possession	35:13	24:47

Team	Category	Player	Statistics
Jacksonville State	Passing	Caden Creel	13/17, 129 yards
Jacksonville State	Rushing	Cam Cook	31 carries, 218 yards, 2 TD
Jacksonville State	Receiving	Pearson Baldwin	5 receptions, 72 yards
Sam Houston	Passing	Hunter Watson	12/19, 136 yards, 3 TD
Sam Houston	Rushing	Alton McCaskill	14 carries, 87 yards
Sam Houston	Receiving	Chris Reed	3 receptions, 63 yards, 2 TD

=== vs. Delaware ===
Game Seven – Delaware Fightin' Blue Hens (3–2) at Jacksonville State Gamecocks (3–3) – Game summary

Quarter	1	2	3	4	Total
Fightin' Blue Hens	0	6	6	13	25
Gamecocks	7	14	14	3	38

at AmFirst Stadium • Jacksonville, AL

- Date: Wednesday October 15, 2025
- Game time: 6:00 p.m. CDT
- Game weather: Clear • Wind: SW 5 mph
- Game attendance: 16,884
- Referee: Reed Brotherton
- TV announcers (ESPN): Clay Matvick (play-by-play) and Chase Daniel (analyst)

Game information

First quarter

- (9:27) JVST – Cam Cook 6-yard run, Garrison Rippa kick (Drive: 1 play, 11 yards, 0:40; Jacksonville State 7–0)

Second quarter

- (10:37) JVST – Caleb Nix 45-yard fumble recovery, Garrison Rippa kick (Jacksonville State 14–0)
- (8:16) JVST – Brock Rechsteiner 23-yard pass from Caden Creel, Garrison Rippa kick (Drive: 3 plays, 48 yards, 1:21; Jacksonville State 21–0)
- (2:23) DEL – Viron Ellison Jr. 1-yard run (Drive: 4 plays, 83 yards, 1:16; Jacksonville State 21–6)

Third quarter

- (8:44) JVST – Cam Cook 1-yard run, Garrison Rippa kick (Drive: 8 plays, 81 yards, 3:19; Jacksonville State 28–6)
- (3:20) JVST – Cam Cook 2-yard run, Garrison Rippa kick (Drive: 6 plays, 43 yards, 2:56; Jacksonville State 35–6)
- (1:41) DEL – Max Patterson 21-yard pass from Nick Minicucci (Drive: 4 plays, 75 yards, 1:39; Jacksonville State 35–12)

Fourth quarter

- (11:57) JVST – Garrison Rippa 52-yard field goal (Drive: 9 plays, 40 yards, 4:44; Jacksonville State 38–12)
- (9:25) DEL – Viron Ellison Jr. 2-yard run, Nate Reed kick (Drive: 8 plays, 65 yards, 2:32; Jacksonville State 38–19)
- (2:52) DEL – Viron Ellison Jr. 4-yard run (Drive: 8 plays, 95 yards, 2:57; Jacksonville State 38–25)

Statistics	DEL	JVST
First downs	22	24
Plays–yards	72–456	66–388
Rushes–yards	22–34	50–255
Passing yards	422	133
Passing: Comp–Att–Int	32–50–0	16–24–0
Turnovers	2	0
Time of possession	26:38	33:22

Team	Category	Player	Statistics
Delaware	Passing	Nick Minicucci	32/50, 422 yards, TD
Delaware	Rushing	Viron Ellison Jr.	8 carries, 15 yards, 3 TD
Delaware	Receiving	Kyre Duplessis	6 receptions, 90 yards
Jacksonville State	Passing	Caden Creel	14/21, 116 yards, TD
Jacksonville State	Rushing	Cam Cook	18 carries, 117 yards, 3 TD
Jacksonville State	Receiving	Brock Rechsteiner	3 receptions, 48 yards, TD

=== at Middle Tennessee ===
Game Eight – Jacksonville State Gamecocks (4–3) at Middle Tennessee Blue Raiders (1–6) – Game summary

Quarter	1	2	3	4	Total
Gamecocks	0	7	0	17	24
Blue Raiders	6	0	8	7	21

at Johnny "Red" Floyd Stadium • Murfreesboro, TN

- Date: Wednesday October 29, 2025
- Game time: 6:30 p.m. CDT
- Game attendance: 10,200
- Referee: Rodney Burnett
- TV announcers (ESPN2): Clay Matvick (play-by-play) and Chase Daniel (analyst)

Game information

First quarter

- MTSU – DJ Taylor 10-yard pass from Nicholas Vattiato (run failed), 4:05. Blue Raiders 6–0. Drive: 7 plays, 54 yards, 3:11.

Second quarter

- JVST – Deondre Johnson 56-yard pass from Gavin Wimsatt (Garrison Rippa kick), 7:25. Gamecocks 7–6. Drive: 4 plays, 82 yards, 1:32.

Third quarter

- MTSU – Jekail Middlebrook 2-yard pass from Nicholas Vattiato (Nicholas Vattiato–Hunter Tipton pass), 5:32. Blue Raiders 14–7. Drive: 11 plays, 80 yards, 5:34.

Fourth quarter

- JVST – Garrison Rippa 47-yard field goal, 13:29. Blue Raiders 14–10. Drive: 14 plays, 45 yards, 7:03.
- JVST – Deondre Johnson 30-yard pass from Caden Creel (Garrison Rippa kick), 10:06. Gamecocks 17–14. Drive: 4 plays, 73 yards, 1:47.
- MTSU – Jekail Middlebrook 6-yard run (Jacob Hathaway kick), 7:45. Blue Raiders 21–17. Drive: 6 plays, 75 yards, 2:21.
- JVST – Cam Cook 3-yard run (Garrison Rippa kick), 4:29. Gamecocks 24–21. Drive: 7 plays, 65 yards, 3:15.

Statistics	JVST	MTSU
First downs	17	18
Plays–yards	70–356	67–319
Rushes–yards	49–141	22–84
Passing yards	215	235
Passing: Comp–Att–Int	15–21–0	23–45–1
Turnovers	0	1
Time of possession	33:00	27:00

Team	Category	Player	Statistics
Jacksonville State	Passing	Caden Creel	13/19, 139 yards, TD
Jacksonville State	Rushing	Cam Cook	21 carries, 103 yards, TD
Jacksonville State	Receiving	Deondre Johnson	4 receptions, 131 yards, 2 TD
Middle Tennessee	Passing	Nicholas Vattiato	23/45, 235 yards, 2 TD, INT
Middle Tennessee	Rushing	Jekail Middlebrook	10 carries, 20 yards, TD
Middle Tennessee	Receiving	Jekail Middlebrook	6 receptions, 87 yards, TD

=== at UTEP ===
Game Nine – Jacksonville State Gamecocks (5–3) at UTEP Miners (2–6) – Game summary

Quarter	1	2	3	4	Total
Gamecocks	10	10	0	10	30
Miners	7	6	7	7	27

at Sun Bowl • El Paso, TX

- Date: Saturday November 8, 2025
- Game time: 2:00 p.m. CST
- Game attendance: 9,536
- Referee: Garrett Dickerson
- TV announcers (ESPN+): Andy Morgan (play-by-play) and Ed Stansbury (analyst)

Game information

First quarter

- JVST – Deondre Johnson 77-yard pass from Caden Creel (Garrison Rippa kick), 11:07. Gamecocks 7–0. Drive: 4 plays, 88 yards, 1:29.
- UTEP – Wondame Davis Jr. 75-yard pass from Skyler Locklear (Carlos Arreola kick), 10:56. Tied 7–7. Drive: 1 play, 75 yards, 0:11.
- JVST – Garrison Rippa 30-yard field goal, 0:53. Gamecocks 10–7. Drive: 13 plays, 53 yards, 4:12.

Second quarter

- JVST – Caleb Nix 93-yard interception return (Garrison Rippa kick), 8:12. Gamecocks 17–7.
- UTEP – Skyler Locklear 1-yard run (pass failed), 3:09. Gamecocks 17–13. Drive: 14 plays, 75 yards, 5:03.
- JVST – Garrison Rippa 36-yard field goal, 0:39. Gamecocks 20–13. Drive: 5 plays, 60 yards, 2:30.

Third quarter

- UTEP – Skyler Locklear 10-yard run (Carlos Arreola kick), 6:38. Tied 20–20. Drive: 11 plays, 47 yards, 5:42.

Fourth quarter

- JVST – Cam Cook 1-yard run (Garrison Rippa kick), 10:01. Gamecocks 27–20. Drive: 7 plays, 64 yards, 2:57.
- UTEP – Eric Willis III 19-yard pass from Skyler Locklear (Carlos Arreola kick), 2:15. Tied 27–27. Drive: 5 plays, 74 yards, 1:45.
- JVST – Garrison Rippa 45-yard field goal, 0:53. Gamecocks 30–27. Drive: 6 plays, 46 yards, 1:22.

Statistics	JVST	UTEP
First downs	23	20
Plays–yards	70–456	69–370
Rushes–yards	39–275	37–126
Passing yards	181	244
Passing: Comp–Att–Int	15–31–1	16–32–1
Turnovers	1	1
Time of possession	30:27	29:33

Team	Category	Player	Statistics
Jacksonville State	Passing	Caden Creel	15/31, 181 yards, TD, INT
Jacksonville State	Rushing	Caden Creel	13 carries, 134 yards
Jacksonville State	Receiving	Deondre Johnson	1 reception, 77 yards, TD
UTEP	Passing	Skyler Locklear	16/32, 244 yards, 2 TD, INT
UTEP	Rushing	Skyler Locklear	17 carries, 82 yards, 2 TD
UTEP	Receiving	Wondame Davis Jr.	5 receptions, 166 yards, TD

=== vs. Kennesaw State ===
Game Ten – Kennesaw State Owls (7-2) at Jacksonville State Gamecocks (6-3) – Game summary

Quarter	1	2	3	4	Total
Owls	7	3	3	13	26
Gamecocks	7	15	3	10	35

at AmFirst Stadium • Jacksonville, Alabama

- Date: Saturday November 15, 2025
- Game time: 7:00 p.m. CST
- Game weather: Clear, 66 °F (19 °C)
- Game attendance: 24,166
- Referee: Rory Bernard
- TV announcers (ESPNU): Jorge Sedano (play-by-play), Rodney McLeod (analyst) and Victoria Arlen (sideline)

Game information

First quarter

- KENN – Amari Odom 1-yard run (Britton Williams kick), 9:47. Owls 7–0. Drive: 14 plays, 65 yards, 5:13.
- JVST – Caden Creel 18-yard run (Garrison Rippa kick), 5:28. Tied 7–7. Drive: 9 plays, 75 yards, 4:19.

Second quarter

- KENN – Daniel Kinney 43-yard field goal, 4:33. Owls 10–7. Drive: 9 plays, 41 yards, 5:21.
- JVST – Cam Cook 6-yard run (Garrison Rippa kick), 2:42. Gamecocks 14–10. Drive: 5 plays, 75 yards, 1:51.
- JVST – Deondre Johnson 62-yard pass from Gavin Wimsatt (Cade Cunningham run), 0:00. Gamecocks 22–10. Drive: 3 plays, 64 yards, 0:39.

Third quarter

- JVST – Garrison Rippa 32-yard field goal, 6:56. Gamecocks 25–10. Drive: 10 plays, 51 yards, 3:48.
- KENN – Daniel Kinney 25-yard field goal, 2:49. Gamecocks 25–13. Drive: 9 plays, 68 yards, 4:07.

Fourth quarter

- JVST – Caden Creel 15-yard run (Garrison Rippa kick), 10:30. Gamecocks 32–13. Drive: 8 plays, 80 yards, 3:43.
- KENN – Calyton Coppock 10-yard pass from Dexter Williams II (pass failed), 7:55. Gamecocks 32–19. Drive: 8 plays, 82 yards, 2:30.
- KENN – Dexter Williams II 9-yard run (Britton Williams II), 3:22. Gamecocks 32–26. Drive: 6 plays, 49 yards, 1:45.
- JVST – Garrison Rippa 27-yard field goal, 0:21. Gamecocks 35–26. Drive: 7 plays, 65 yards, 3:01.

Statistics	KENN	JVST
First downs	32	18
Plays–yards	90–579	56–451
Rushes–yards	46–217	42–252
Passing yards	362	199
Passing: Comp–Att–Int	27–44–4	9–14–0
Turnovers	4	0
Time of possession	34:22	25:38

Team	Category	Player	Statistics
Kennesaw State	Passing	Amari Odom	19/31, 248 yards, 3 INT
Kennesaw State	Rushing	Chase Belcher	8 carries, 62 yards
Kennesaw State	Receiving	Gabriel Benyard	5 receptions, 100 yards
Jacksonville State	Passing	Caden Creel	8/13, 137 yards
Jacksonville State	Rushing	Cam Cook	27 carries, 132 yards, TD
Jacksonville State	Receiving	Deondre Johnson	2 receptions, 112 yards, TD

=== at FIU ===
Game Eleven – Jacksonville State Gamecocks (7-3) at FIU Panthers (5-5) – Game summary

Quarter	1	2	3	4	Total
Gamecocks	7	7	7	0	21
Panthers	7	0	10	10	27

at Pitbull Stadium • Miami, FL

- Date: Saturday November 22, 2025
- Game time: 2:30 p.m. CST
- Game attendance: 9,504
- Referee: Douglas Mercer
- TV announcers (CBSSN): Jordan Kent (play-by-play) and Logan Ryan (analyst)

Game information

First quarter

- FIU – Kejon Owens 3-yard run (Noah Grant kick), 7:06. Panthers 7–0. Drive: 8 plays, 68 yards, 3:25.
- JVST – Deondre Johnson 28-yard pass from Caden Creel (Garrison Rippa kick), 5:09. Tied 7–7. Drive: 5 plays, 75 yards, 1:57.

Second quarter

- JVST – Cam Cook 1-yard run (Garrison Rippa kick), 8:06. Gamecocks 14–7. Drive: 6 plays, 16 yards, 2:30.

Third quarter

- FIU – Chad Staley 1-yard pass from Joe Pesansky (Noah Grant kick), 9:33. Tied 14–14. Drive: 10 plays, 75 yards, 5:27.
- JVST – Pearson Baldwin 20-yard pass from Caden Creel (Garrison Rippa kick), 7:14. Gamecocks 21–14. Drive: 1 play, 20 yards, 0:08.
- FIU – Noah Grant 35-yard field goal, 0:35. Gamecocks 21–17. Drive: 6 plays, 44 yards, 3:19.

Fourth quarter

- FIU – Alex Perry 64-yard pass from Joe Pesansky (Noah Grant kick), 12:56. Panthers 24–21. Drive: 2 plays, 68 yards, 0:46.
- FIU – Noah Grant 42-yard field goal, 1:54. Panthers 27–21. Drive: 7 plays, 47 yards, 4:33.

Statistics	JVST	FIU
First downs	23	19
Plays–yards	77–449	69–398
Rushes–yards	46–251	41–202
Passing yards	198	196
Passing: Comp–Att–Int	17–31–0	14–28–2
Turnovers	2	3
Time of possession	28:22	31:38

Team	Category	Player	Statistics
Jacksonville State	Passing	Caden Creel	17/30, 198 yards, 2 TD
Jacksonville State	Rushing	Cam Cook	25 carries, 138 yards, TD
Jacksonville State	Receiving	Deondre Johnson	3 receptions, 49 yards, TD
FIU	Passing	Joe Pesansky	14/28, 196 yards, 2 TD, 2 INT
FIU	Rushing	Kejon Owens	21 carries, 135 yards, TD
FIU	Receiving	Alex Perry	4 receptions, 109 yards, TD

=== vs. Western Kentucky ===
Game Twelve – Western Kentucky Hilltoppers (8–3) at Jacksonville State Gamecocks (7–4) – Game summary

Quarter	1	2	3	4	Total
Hilltoppers	14	14	3	3	34
Gamecocks	7	17	7	6	37

at AmFirst Stadium • Jacksonville, AL

- Date: Saturday November 29, 2025
- Game time: 1:00 p.m. CST
- Game attendance: 16,733
- Referee: Garrett Dickerson
- TV announcers (ESPN+): Eli Gold (play-by-play), Jeff Burger (analyst) and Taylor Korn (sideline)

Game information

First quarter

- JVST – Cam Cook 14-yard run (Garrison Rippa kick), 12:13. Gamecocks 7–0. Drive: 7 plays, 75 yards, 2:47.
- WKU – Rodney Tisdale Jr. 1-yard run (John Cannon kick), 8:28. Tied 7–7. Drive: 7 plays, 66 yards, 3:45.
- WKU – La'Vell Wright 1-yard run (John Cannon kick), 6:15. Hilltoppers 14–7. Drive: 4 plays, 46 yards, 1:40.

Second quarter

- WKU – K.D. Hutchinson 13-yard run (John Cannon kick), 14:53. Hilltoppers 21–7. Drive: 11 plays, 65 yards, 4:11.
- JVST – Garrison Rippa 27-yard field goal, 9:33. Hilltoppers 21–10. Drive: 10 plays, 65 yards, 5:20.
- JVST – Pearson Baldwin 2-yard pass from Caden Creel (Garrison Rippa kick), 6:18. Hilltoppers 21–17. Drive: 4 plays, 10 yards, 1:47.
- WKU – La'Vell Wright 39-yard run (John Cannon kick), 1:52. Hilltoppers 28–17. Drive: 9 plays, 90 yards, 4:17.
- JVST – Deondre Johnson 22-yard pass from Caden Creel (Garrison Rippa kick), 0:15. Hilltoppers 28–24. Drive: 6 plays, 75 yards, 1:37.

Third quarter

- JVST – Caden Creel 70-yard run (Garrison Rippa kick), 11:22. Gamecocks 31–28. DrivE: 3 plays, 76 yards, 1:22.
- WKU – John Cannon 42-yard field goal, 7:16. Tied 31–31. Drive: 8 plays, 51 yards, 4:06.

Fourth quarter

- JVST – Garrison Rippa 27-yard field goal, 12:28. Gamecocks 34–31. Drive: 11 plays, 66 yards, 4:00.
- WKU – Jack Cassidy 41-yard field goal, 8:19. Tied 34–34. Drive: 4 plays, 2 yards, 1:53.
- JVST – Garrison Rippa 28-yard field goal, 0:00. Gamecocks 37–34. Drive: 11 plays, 50 yards, 4:18.

Statistics	WKU	JVST
First downs	21	24
Plays–yards	61–384	68–515
Rushes–yards	36–204	48–293
Passing yards	180	222
Passing: Comp–Att–Int	17–25–1	13–20–0
Turnovers	2	1
Time of possession	28:36	31:24

Team	Category	Player	Statistics
Western Kentucky	Passing	Rodney Tisdale Jr.	17/24, 180 yards, INT
Western Kentucky	Rushing	La'Vell Wright	14 carries, 116 yards, 2 TD
Western Kentucky	Receiving	Moussa Barry	3 receptions, 68 yards
Jacksonville State	Passing	Caden Creel	12/19, 204 yards, 2 TD
Jacksonville State	Rushing	Caden Creel	20 carries, 143 yards, TD
Jacksonville State	Receiving	Deondre Johnson	5 receptions, 122 yards, TD

=== vs. Kennesaw State (Conference USA Championship Game) ===
Game Thirteen – 2025 Conference USA Championship Game
Kennesaw State Owls (9–3) at Jacksonville State Gamecocks (8–4) – Game summary

Quarter	1	2	3	4	Total
Owls	0	7	3	9	19
Gamecocks	0	0	0	15	15

at AmFirst Stadium • Jacksonville, AL

- Date: Friday, December 5, 2025
- Game time: 6:00 p.m. CST
- Game weather: Sunny, 43 °F (6 °C)
- Game attendance: 18,142
- Referee: Ron Hudson
- TV announcers (CBSSN): Rich Waltz (play-by-play), Robert Turbin (analyst) and Jordan Giorgio (sideline)

Game information

First quarter

- No scoring plays.

Second quarter

- KENN – Coleman Bennett 3-yard run (Britton Williams kick), 13:03. Owls 7–0. Drive: 11 plays, 80 yards, 4:33.

Third quarter

- KENN – Britton Williams 38-yard field goal, 9:57. Owls 10–0. Drive: 11 plays, 55 yards, 5:03.

Fourth quarter

- KENN – Cam Cook tackled in own end zone, 12:33. Owls 12–0.
- JVSU – Cam Cook 1-yard run (Garrison Rippa kick), 10:20. Owls 12–7. Drive: 7 plays, 48 yards, 2:04.
- JVSU – Caden Creel 19-yard run (Caden Creel pass to Deondre Johnson), 4:04. Gamecocks 15–12. Drive: 9 plays, 59 yards, 4:16.
- KENN – Navelle Dean 11-yard pass from Amari Odom (Britton Williams kick), 0:51. Owls 19–15. Drive: 11 plays, 75 yards, 3:13.

Statistics	KENN	JVST
First downs	23	19
Plays–yards	68–318	62–306
Rushes–yards	36–72	40–210
Passing yards	246	96
Passing: Comp–Att–Int	26–32–0	12–22–1
Turnovers	1	1
Time of possession	31:12	28:48

Team	Category	Player	Statistics
Kennesaw State	Passing	Amari Odom	26/32, 246 yards, TD
Kennesaw State	Rushing	Coleman Bennett	17 carries, 82 yards, TD
Kennesaw State	Receiving	Christian Moss	5 receptions, 75 yards
Jacksonville State	Passing	Caden Creel	12/21, 96 yards, INT
Jacksonville State	Rushing	Caden Creel	18 rushes, 112 yards, TD
Jacksonville State	Receiving	Deondre Johnson	4 receptions, 59 yards

=== vs. Troy (Salute to Veterans Bowl) ===
Game Fourteen – 2025 IS4S Salute to Veterans Bowl
Troy Trojans (8-5) vs. Jacksonville State Gamecocks (8-5) – Game summary

Quarter	1	2	3	4	Total
Trojans	7	6	0	0	13
Gamecocks	7	0	3	7	17

at Cramton Bowl • Montgomery, AL

- Date: Tuesday, December 16, 2025
- Game time: 8:00 p.m. CST
- Game weather: Clear • Temperature: 38 °F (3 °C) • Wind: SE 1 mph
- Game attendance: 15,721
- Referee: Rich Edwards
- TV announcers (ESPN): Matt Barrie (play-by-play), Tom Luginbill (analyst) and Harry Lyles Jr. (sideline)

Game information

First Quarter

- (9:41) JVST – Brock Rechsteiner 22-yard pass from Caden Creel, Garrison Rippa kick (Drive: 9 plays, 71 yards, 3:41; Jacksonville State 7–0)
- (1:39) TROY – Luis Medina 0-yard fumble return, Scott Taylor Renfroe kick (Drive: 1 play, -12 yards, 0:07; Tied 7–7)

Second Quarter

- (10:57) TROY – Scott Taylor Renfroe 38-yard field goal (Drive: 9 plays, 25 yards, 4:00; Troy 10–7)
- (1:55) TROY – Scott Taylor Renfroe 30-yard field goal (Drive: 11 plays, 58 yards, 6:35; Troy 13–7)

Third Quarter

- (6:35) JVST – Garrison Rippa 51-yard field goal (Drive: 9 plays, 22 yards, 4:16; Troy 13–10)

Fourth Quarter

- (10:06) JVST – Andrew Paul 1-yard run, Garrison Rippa kick (Drive: 11 plays, 47 yards, 5:44; Jacksonville State 17–13)

Statistics	TROY	JVST
First downs	15	15
Plays–yards	62–217	65–273
Rushes–yards	32–88	43–100
Passing yards	129	173
Passing: Comp–Att–Int	15–30–2	14–22–0
Turnovers	2	1
Time of possession	29:30	30:30

Team	Category	Player	Statistics
Troy	Passing	Tucker Kilcrease	12/23, 116 yards, 2 INT
Troy	Rushing	Dennis Palmer	8 carries, 37 yards
Troy	Receiving	RaRa Thomas	5 receptions, 52 yards
Jacksonville State	Passing	Caden Creel	14/20, 173 yards, TD
Jacksonville State	Rushing	Khristian Lando	11 carries, 44 yards
Jacksonville State	Receiving	Deondre Johnson	6 receptions, 101 yards
