= 2025 Salute to Veterans Bowl =

Postseason college football bowl game

2025 IS4S Salute to Veterans Bowl
- 12th Salute to Veterans Bowl
Troy Trojans	Jacksonville State Gamecocks
(8–5)	(8–5)
Sun Belt	CUSA
13	17
Head coach: Gerad Parker	Head coach: Charles Kelly
	1	2	3	4	Total
Troy	7	6	0	0	13
Jacksonville State	7	0	3	7	17
- Date: December 16, 2025
- Season: 2025
- Stadium: Cramton Bowl
- Location: Montgomery, Alabama
- MVP: Caden Creel (QB, Jacksonville State)
- Favorite: Troy by 1.5
- Referee: Rich Edwards (MAC)
- Attendance: 15,721

United States TV coverage
- Network: ESPN
- Announcers: Matt Barrie (play-by-play), Tom Luginbill (analyst), and Harry Lyles Jr. (sideline)

The 2025 Salute to Veterans Bowl was a college football bowl game played on December 16, 2025, at the Cramton Bowl in Montgomery, Alabama. The 12th Salute to Veterans Bowl, the game was played between Troy and Jacksonville State. The game began at approximately 8:00 p.m. CST and was aired on ESPN. The Salute to Veterans Bowl was one of the 2025–26 bowl games concluding the 2025 FBS football season. Sponsored by information technology company Integrated Solutions for Systems (IS4S), the game was officially known as the IS4S Salute to Veterans Bowl.

The 2025 Salute to Veterans Bowl featured the Jacksonville State Gamecocks (who had a regular season record of 8–5 and finished in a tie for first place in Conference USA) and the Troy Trojans (who also had a record of 8–5 and finished in first place in the Sun Belt Conference West Division). Jacksonville State defeated Troy by a score of 17–13.

== Teams ==
Based on conference tie-ins, the game was expected to feature teams from the Mid-American Conference (MAC) and the Sun Belt Conference. The actual matchup announced included a team from Conference USA (CUSA) in place of a MAC team, with Troy facing Jacksonville State.

The game was the first meeting between the Trojans and Gamecocks since 2001, reviving the Battle for the Ol' School Bell rivalry that originally ended when Troy moved from Division I-AA (FCS) to Division I-A (FBS); Jax State had moved to FBS in 2023 after joining Conference USA. Troy head coach Gerad Parker stated it was unclear if the titular bell would be present for the game due to its unknown location, and that "our guys weren't even born since the last time the two teams played, but I want them to understand the richness of this rivalry and I am anxious for them to be educated about it because of the fan base they'll be playing in front of."

=== Troy Trojans ===
Troy began their season with two losses in their first three games, then had a five-game winning streak, giving them a 6–2 record at the end of October. They ended their season with two losses in their final four regular-season games, for an 8–4 record entering the 2025 Sun Belt Conference Football Championship Game, which they lost to James Madison. The Trojans entered the bowl with an 8–5 record.

=== Jacksonville State Gamecocks ===
Jacksonville began their season with three losses in their first five games, then had a five-game winning streak, giving them a record of 7–3 at mid-November. They split their final two regular-season games, giving them a record of 8–4 entering the 2025 Conference USA Football Championship Game, which they lost to Kennesaw State. The Gamecocks entered the bowl with an 8–5 record.

== Game summary ==
2025 Salute to Veterans Bowl

Quarter	1	2	3	4	Total
Troy	7	6	0	0	13
Jacksonville State	7	0	3	7	17

at Cramton Bowl • Montgomery, Alabama

- Date: Tuesday, December 16, 2025
- Game time: 8:00 p.m. CST
- Game weather: Clear • Temperature: 38 °F (3 °C) • Wind: 1 mph (1.6 km/h) southeast
- Game attendance: 15,721
- Referee: Rich Edwards
- TV announcers (ESPN): Matt Barrie (play-by-play), Tom Luginbill (analyst), and Harry Lyles Jr. (sideline)
- Box score

=== Statistics ===
Statistics	TROY	JXST
First downs	15	15
Plays–yards	62–217	65–273
Rushes–yards	32–88	43–100
Passing yards	129	173
Passing: comp–att–int	15–30–2	14–22–0
Time of possession	29:30	30:30

Team	Category	Player	Statistics
Troy	Passing	Tucker Kilcrease	12/23, 116 yards, 2 INT
Troy	Rushing	Dennis Palmer	8 carries, 37 yards
Troy	Receiving	Rara Thomas	5 receptions, 52 yards
Jacksonville State	Passing	Caden Creel	14/20, 173 yards, TD
Jacksonville State	Rushing	Khristian Lando	11 carries, 44 yards
Jacksonville State	Receiving	Deondre Johnson	6 receptions, 101 yards
