= Walker (given name) =

Origin
- Origin: Old English

Walker is an occupational male given name, deriving from the English term for "cloth washer". It has recently increased in use for boys in the United States due to the influence of the American CW Network television series Walker, a reboot of the 1993-2001 television series Walker, Texas Ranger. It was first recorded as a name in the Middle Ages.

Notable people with the name include:

- Walker Anderson (1801–1857), American politician
- Walker Keith Armistead (1783–1845), American military officer
- Walker Lee Ashley (born 1960), American football player
- Walker Keith Baylor (1794–1845), American jurist and politician
- Walker Banks (born 1947), American politician
- Walker Blaine (1855–1890), American politician
- Walker Bleakney (1901–1992), American physicist
- Walker Boone (1944–2021), Canadian actor
- Walker Brooke (1813–1869), American politician
- Walker Buehler (born 1994), American baseball player
- Walker Butler (1898–1969), American jurist and politician
- Walker O. Cain (1915–1993), American architect
- Walker Calhoun (1918–2012), American musician
- Walker Carpenter (1893–1956), American football player
- Walker Lee Cisler (1897–1994), American engineer
- Walker Connor (1926–2017), American political scientist
- Walker Cooper (1915–1991), American baseball player
- Walker Cress (1917–1996), American baseball player
- Walker M. Curtiss (1852–1917), American politician
- Walker Rannie Davidson (1808–1876), Australian surveyor
- Walker Duehr (born 1997), American ice hockey player
- Walker Edmiston (1926–2007), American actor
- Walker Eget (born 2003), American football player
- Walker Ellis (1895–1974), English cricketer
- Walker Evans (1903–1975), American photographer
- Walker Evans (racing driver) (born 1938), American racing driver
- Walker Fearn (1832–1899), American general
- Walker Américo Frônio (born 1982), Brazilian footballer
- Walker Gillette (born 1947), American football player
- Walker Grimshaw, Canadian filmmaker
- Walker Hamilton (1934–1969), Scottish writer
- Walker Hampson (1889–1959), English footballer
- Walker Hancock (1901–1998), American sculptor
- Walker Hayes (born 1979), American singer
- Walker Hines (railroad executive) (1870–1934), American railroad executive
- Walker Hines (politician) (born 1984), American businessman and politician
- Walker Howard (born 2003), American football player
- Walker Hume (born 1993), American soccer player
- Walker Janek (born 2002), American baseball player
- Walker Jenkins (born 2005), American baseball player
- Walker Kessler (born 2001), American basketball player
- Walker King (1751–1827), English churchman
- Walker King (priest) (1798–1958), English archdeacon
- Walker Lambiotte (born 1967), American basketball player
- Walker Leach (1888–1944), American football player
- Walker Lewis (1798–1856), American abolitionist
- Walker Little (born 1999), American football player
- Walker Lockett (born 1994), American baseball player
- Walker Lukens, American singer-songwriter
- Walker Lyons (born 2004), American football player
- Walker Martin (born 2004), American baseball player
- Walker McCall (born 1954), Scottish footballer
- Walker David Miller (1939–2013), American judge
- Walker Parks (born 2001), American football player
- Walker Percy (1916–1990), American author
- Walker Powell (1828–1915), Canadian businessman and politician
- Walker Railey (born 1947), American minister
- Walker Reynolds (1888–1977), American football player
- Walker Russell (born 1960), American basketball player
- Walker Russell Jr. (born 1982), American basketball player
- Walker Smith (disambiguation)
- Walker Scobell (born 2009), American actor
- Walker Shabazz-Edwards (born 2007), Guyanese footballer
- Walker Stapleton (born 1974), American politician
- Walker Thomas (born 1963), American politician
- Walker Todd (1786–1840), American lawyer and politician
- Walker Whiting Vick (1878–1926), American politician
- Walker Wainwright (1882–1961), English cricketer
- Walker White (born 2005), American football player
- Walker Whiteside (1869–1942), American actor
- Walker Wood (1874–1957), American journalist and politician
- Walker Zimmerman (born 1993), American soccer player

== See also ==
- Walker (surname)
- Walker (disambiguation)
- Walker (taxonomic authority)
