= Walker =

Walker or The Walker may refer to:

== People ==
- Walker (given name)
- Walker (surname)
- Walker (Brazilian footballer) (born 1982), Brazilian footballer

== Places ==
=== In the United States ===
- Walker, Arizona, in Yavapai County
- Walker, Mono County, California
- Walker, Illinois
- Walker, Iowa
- Walker, Kansas
- Walker, Louisiana
- Walker, Michigan
- Walker, Minnesota
- Walker, Missouri
- Walker, West Virginia
- Walker, Wisconsin
- Walker Brook, a stream in Minnesota
- Walker Charcoal Kiln, Arizona
- Walker Lake (disambiguation), several lakes
- Walker Pass, California
- Walker River, Nevada
- Walker Township (disambiguation), several places

=== Other places ===
- Walker, Edmonton, Alberta, Canada
- Walker, Newcastle upon Tyne, England
- Walker Island (Northern Tasmania), Tasmania, Australia
- Walker Island (Southern Tasmania), Tasmania, Australia
- Walker Mountains, in Antarctica
- Walker (crater), a lunar impact crater on the far side of the Moon

== Education ==
- Walker School, historic elementary school building in Taunton, Massachusetts, United States
- Walker School of Business, Piedmont University, Georgia, United States
- Walker Riverside Academy, secondary school in Newcastle upon Tyne, Tyne and Wear, England
- The Walker School, private school in Marietta, Georgia, United States

== In arts, entertainment, and media ==
=== Fictional entities ===
- Walker (Star Wars), a vehicle from the Star Wars films
- Walker Brodsky, a recurring character and young artist from Disney Channel series Andi Mack
- Mr. Walker (for "Ghost who walks"), name used by The Phantom when in Western society
- Walker, enforcer of the status quo and character in Simon R. Green's Nightside (book series)
- Walker, the name for the type of zombies in The Walking Dead (TV series)
- Bethany Walker, in the film, Jumanji: Welcome to the Jungle
- Katie Walker, in the TV series Power Rangers Time Force

=== Films ===
- Walker (film), a 1987 film about William Walker
- The Walker, a 2007 film written and directed by Paul Schrader
- The Walker (1967 film), an Argentine comedy drama film

=== Music ===
- Walker (album), the soundtrack album from the Alex Cox film, written and produced by Joe Strummer
- "The Walker" (song), a song by Fitz and The Tantrums
- "The Walker" or "La Marcheuse", a song by Christine and the Queens from the album Chris
- "Walker". a song by Animal Collective from the album Time Skiffs

=== Television ===
- Walker, Texas Ranger, a 1993–2001 American action-drama television series that aired on CBS
- Walker (TV series), a reboot television series, based on the original 1993–2001 series, that airs on The CW

=== Other arts, entertainment, and media ===
- Walker (video game), an Amiga 500 game

== Brands, organizations, and enterprises ==
- Walker, a brand of automotive exhaust parts from Tenneco corporation
- Amiga Walker, a prototype of an Amiga computer
- Colt Walker, a single action revolver designed by Samuel Colt in 1846
- J. W. Walker & Sons Ltd, English organ builders
- Walker Art Center, in Minneapolis, Minnesota, United States
- Walker Art Gallery, in Liverpool, England
- Walker Books, a British publisher of children's books, most famous for the Where's Wally?/Where's Waldo? series
- Walker Business College, defunct African American vocational and business school in two locations in the U.S.
- Walker Corporation, Australian-based property development company
- Walker Motor Car Company, active from 1905 to 1906 in Detroit, Michigan, United States
- Walker & Co., an American publisher

== Other uses ==
- Walker (escort), a man who accompanies fashionable women to society events
- Walker (machine), a vehicle that moves on legs rather than wheels or tracks
- Walker (mobility), a two or four-footed frame that elderly or disabled people use as a walking aid

- Baby walker, used by infants who cannot walk on their own

- Walker, a person traveling by walking; see pedestrian
- Walker, someone who is sleepwalking
- Walker, another name for a fuller
- HMS Walker (D27), a British destroyer in commission in the Royal Navy from 1918 to 1932 and from 1939 to 1945
- Walker tariff, an 1846 U.S. tariff
- Walker circulation, a conceptual model of the air flow in the tropics in the lower atmosphere (troposphere).

== See also ==
- Walker Brothers (disambiguation)
- Walkers (disambiguation)
- Walking (disambiguation)
- Justice Walker (disambiguation)
