= 2025 68 Ventures Bowl =

Postseason college football bowl game

- 27th 68 Ventures Bowl
Louisiana Ragin' Cajuns	Delaware Fightin' Blue Hens
(6–6)	(6–6)
SBC	CUSA
13	20
Head coach: Michael Desormeaux	Head coach: Ryan Carty
	1	2	3	4	Total
Louisiana	0	3	3	7	13
Delaware	7	3	10	0	20
- Date: December 17, 2025
- Season: 2025
- Stadium: Hancock Whitney Stadium
- Location: Mobile, Alabama
- MVP: Jo Silver (RB, Delaware)
- Favorite: Louisiana by 2.5
- Referee: Reid Jackson (American)

United States TV coverage
- Network: ESPN
- Announcers: Clay Matvick (play-by-play), Max Browne (analyst), and Alyssa Lang (sideline reporter); Mike Grace (play-by-play), Chad Pilcher (analyst) and Randy Kennedy (sideline) (Bowl Season Radio)

The 2025 68 Ventures Bowl was a college football bowl game played on December 17, 2025, at Hancock Whitney Stadium in Mobile, Alabama. The 27th annual 68 Ventures Bowl (though only the third game under that name) featured the Delaware Fightin' Blue Hens from the Conference USA and the Louisiana Ragin' Cajuns from the Sun Belt Conference. The game began at approximately 8:30 p.m. ET and was aired on ESPN. The 68 Ventures Bowl was one of the 2025–26 bowl games concluding the 2025 FBS football season. The title sponsor for the game was 68 Ventures, a company that does development, investment, and construction on the Gulf Coast.

The game featured the Louisiana Ragin' Cajuns (6–6) from the Sun Belt Conference and the Delaware Fightin' Blue Hens (6–6) from Conference USA. Delaware beat Louisiana by a score of 20–13.

== Teams ==
=== Louisiana Ragin' Cajuns ===
Louisiana opened their regular season with three losses in their first four games, then lost their next three games; their record stood at 2–6 at the end of October. The Ragin' Cajuns finished their regular season with four consecutive wins, and entered the 68 Ventures Bowl with a 6–6 record.

=== Delaware Fightin' Blue Hens ===
Delaware began their season with three wins in their first four games, then suffered back-to back losses; their record stood at 3–3 in mid-October. The Fightin' Blue Hens won three of their final six games to post an overall 6–6 record for the regular season.

This was Delaware's first year in the Football Bowl Subdivision (FBS), having previously competed in the Football Championship Subdivision (FCS). Although initially ineligible for postseason play due to FCS-to-FBS transition rules, Delaware received a bowl bid because there were not enough six-win teams eligible for the 42 FBS bowl games.

== Game summary ==
2025 68 Ventures Bowl

Quarter	1	2	3	4	Total
Louisiana	0	3	3	7	13
Delaware	7	3	10	0	20

at Hancock Whitney Stadium • Mobile, Alabama

- Date: Wednesday, December 17, 2025
- Game time: 7:30 p.m. CST
- Game weather: Sunny • Temperature: 62 °F (17 °C) • Wind: 5 mph (8.0 km/h) east
- Referee: Reid Jackson
- TV announcers (ESPN): Clay Matvick (play-by-play), Max Browne (analyst), and Alyssa Lang (sideline reporter)
- Box score

=== Statistics ===
Statistics	UL	DEL
First downs	20	16
Plays–yards	77–335	60–334
Rushes–yards	104	158
Passing yards	231	176
Passing: comp–att–int	21–38–1	19–30–0
Time of possession	33:55	26:05

Team	Category	Player	Statistics
Louisiana	Passing	Lunch Winfield	21/36, 231 yards, 1 TD, 1 INT
Louisiana	Rushing	Lunch Winfield	14 carries, 40 yards
Louisiana	Receiving	Caden Jensen	4 receptions, 72 yards
Delaware	Passing	Nick Minicucci	19/30, 176 yards, 1 TD, 0 INT
Delaware	Rushing	Jo Silver	14 carries, 116 yards, 1 TD
Delaware	Receiving	Sean Wilson	8 receptions, 81 yards, 1 TD
