= 68 Ventures Bowl =

FBS bowl game in Mobile, Alabama

- Stadium: Hancock Whitney Stadium
- Location: Mobile, Alabama
- Previous stadiums: Ladd–Peebles Stadium
- Operated: 1999–present
- Conference tie-ins: Sun Belt, MAC
- Previous conference tie-ins: ACC, C-USA, WAC
- Payout: US$1.5 million (2019 season)
- Website: 68venturesbowl.com

Sponsors
- Mobile Alabama Bowl, Inc. (1999); GMAC (2000–2010); GoDaddy (2011–2015); Dollar General (2016–2018); LendingTree (2019–2022); 68 Ventures (2023–present)

Former names
- Mobile Alabama Bowl (1999, May–Nov. 2019); GMAC Mobile Alabama Bowl (2000); GMAC Bowl (2001–2010); GoDaddy.com Bowl (2011–2013); GoDaddy Bowl (2014–2015); Dollar General Bowl (2016–2018); LendingTree Bowl (2019–2022)

2025 matchup
- Louisiana vs. Delaware (Delaware 20–13)

The 68 Ventures Bowl is a postseason NCAA-sanctioned Division I FBS college football bowl game that has been played annually in Mobile, Alabama since 1999. In 2021, the game was moved from Ladd–Peebles Stadium to Hancock Whitney Stadium, on the campus of the University of South Alabama. The game currently matches teams from the Sun Belt Conference and the Mid-American Conference. Originally known as the Mobile Alabama Bowl during its first two editions, it has since undergone numerous name changes.

== History ==
The game was known as the Mobile Alabama Bowl for its first two playings, in 1999 and 2000. GMAC (now Ally Financial) had become the title sponsor for the 2000 playing, and the game was renamed as the GMAC Bowl for the 2001 though January 2010 playings. It was then the GoDaddy.com Bowl for the January 2011 to January 2013 playings when GoDaddy took over sponsorship. In May 2013, it was announced that the ".com" would be dropped from the bowl's name, rebranding it as the GoDaddy Bowl for the January 2014 through December 2015 editions. Dollar General took over sponsorship on August 17, 2016, with the 2016 through 2018 playings branded as the Dollar General Bowl. It was announced on May 29, 2019, that Dollar General would no longer sponsor the bowl. It was temporarily called by its original name, the Mobile Alabama Bowl, until new sponsorship by LendingTree was announced on November 15, 2019, making it the LendingTree Bowl. On May 15, 2023, the game was renamed as the 68 Ventures Bowl for its new sponsor, Daphne based 68 Ventures, a real estate investment company.

When the bowl first began, it was played as one of the first games of the bowl season in December. The 2006 season saw the game moved to January, and it served as one of the last bowls played before the national championship game of either the Bowl Championship Series or the College Football Playoff. For the 2015 season, the bowl was moved back to December, where it remained for every subsequent playing except for the 2019 season.

=== Conference tie-ins ===
From 1999 to 2009, the bowl pitted a Conference USA (C-USA) team against a team from the Mid-American Conference (MAC), except for the first two playings, when the Western Athletic Conference (WAC) could receive the bid if one of its easternmost teams qualified as bowl eligible.

For the January 2010 edition, the Atlantic Coast Conference (ACC) was to participate in the bowl as its ninth bowl tie-in. The ACC failed to have sufficient bowl-eligible teams to fill the slot, and the bowl chose Sun Belt Conference champion Troy as a replacement. A MAC vs. Sun Belt matchup was then featured for a total of 11 consecutive bowls, through the January 2020 edition. That streak was broken when the December 2020 edition invited teams from C-USA and the Sun Belt. After Arkansas State of the Sun Belt appeared in the 2012 through 2015 editions of the bowl, the conference and bowl committee agreed on changing the team selection bylaws to avoid repeat appearances by teams in consecutive years.

=== Notable games ===
- The 2001 game between the Marshall Thundering Herd and East Carolina Pirates set the record as the highest-scoring bowl game of all time, and Marshall achieved what was then the greatest scoring comeback in bowl history. In this contest, Marshall battled back from a 38–8 deficit to win 64–61, in double overtime. Thundering Herd quarterback Byron Leftwich threw for 576 yards in the game.
- The 2008 game had the largest margin of victory in the bowl's history, with Tulsa defeating Bowling Green, 63–7.
- Following the 2023 game, a 59–10 win by South Alabama over Eastern Michigan, an altercation took place on-field between the teams prior to the trophy presentation, initiated by an Eastern Michigan player sucker punching a South Alabama player while the South Alabama marching band and team were singing the school's alma mater.

== Game results ==
Date	Bowl name	Winning team		Losing team		Attnd.	Ref.
December 22, 1999	Mobile Alabama Bowl	TCU	28	East Carolina	14	34,200	
December 20, 2000	Mobile Alabama Bowl	Southern Miss	28	TCU	21	40,300	
December 19, 2001	GMAC Bowl	Marshall	64	East Carolina	61 (2OT)	40,139	
December 18, 2002	GMAC Bowl	Marshall	38	Louisville	15	40,646	
December 18, 2003	GMAC Bowl	Miami (Ohio)	49	Louisville	28	40,620	
December 22, 2004	GMAC Bowl	Bowling Green	52	Memphis	35	29,500	
December 21, 2005	GMAC Bowl	Toledo	45	UTEP	13	35,422	
January 7, 2007	GMAC Bowl	Southern Miss	28	Ohio	7	28,706	
January 6, 2008	GMAC Bowl	Tulsa	63	Bowling Green	7	36,932	
January 6, 2009	GMAC Bowl	Tulsa	45	Ball State	13	32,816	
January 6, 2010	GMAC Bowl	Central Michigan	44	Troy	41 (2OT)	34,486	
January 6, 2011	GoDaddy.com Bowl	Miami (Ohio)	35	Middle Tennessee	21	38,168	
January 8, 2012	GoDaddy.com Bowl	Northern Illinois	38	Arkansas State	20	38,734	
January 6, 2013	GoDaddy.com Bowl	Arkansas State	17	Kent State	13	37,913	
January 5, 2014	GoDaddy Bowl	Arkansas State	23	Ball State	20	36,119	
January 4, 2015	GoDaddy Bowl	Toledo	63	Arkansas State	44	36,811	
December 23, 2015	GoDaddy Bowl	Georgia Southern	58	Bowling Green	27	28,656	
December 23, 2016	Dollar General Bowl	Troy	28	Ohio	23	32,377	
December 23, 2017	Dollar General Bowl	Appalachian State	34	Toledo	0	28,706	
December 22, 2018	Dollar General Bowl	Troy	42	Buffalo	32	31,818	
January 6, 2020	LendingTree Bowl	Louisiana	27	Miami (Ohio)	17	29,212	
December 26, 2020	LendingTree Bowl	Georgia State	39	Western Kentucky	21	5,128	
December 18, 2021	LendingTree Bowl	Liberty	56	Eastern Michigan	20	15,186	
December 17, 2022	LendingTree Bowl	Southern Miss	38	Rice	24	20,512	
December 23, 2023	68 Ventures Bowl	South Alabama	59	Eastern Michigan	10	20,926	
December 26, 2024	68 Ventures Bowl	Arkansas State	38	Bowling Green	31	19,582	
December 17, 2025	68 Ventures Bowl	Delaware	20	Louisiana	13	17,234	

== MVPs ==
Date played	MVP	School	Position
December 22, 1999	Casey Printers	TCU	QB
December 20, 2000	LaDainian Tomlinson	TCU	RB
December 19, 2001	Byron Leftwich	Marshall	QB
December 18, 2002	Byron Leftwich	Marshall	QB
December 18, 2003	Ben Roethlisberger	Miami (OH)	QB
December 22, 2004	Omar Jacobs	Bowling Green	QB
December 21, 2005	Bruce Gradkowski	Toledo	QB
January 7, 2007	Damion Fletcher	Southern Miss	RB
January 6, 2008	Paul Smith	Tulsa	QB
January 6, 2009	Tarrion Adams	Tulsa	RB
January 6, 2010	Dan LeFevour	Central Michigan	QB
January 6, 2011	Austin Boucher	Miami (OH)	QB
January 8, 2012	Chandler Harnish	Northern Illinois	QB
January 6, 2013	Ryan Aplin	Arkansas State	QB
January 5, 2014	Fredi Knighten	Arkansas State	QB
January 4, 2015	Kareem Hunt	Toledo	RB
December 23, 2015	Favian Upshaw	Georgia Southern	QB
December 23, 2016	Justin Lucas	Troy	LB
December 23, 2017	Jalin Moore	Appalachian State	RB
December 22, 2018	Sawyer Smith	Troy	QB
January 6, 2020	Levi Lewis	Louisiana	QB
December 26, 2020	Cornelious Brown IV	Georgia State	QB
December 18, 2021	Malik Willis	Liberty	QB
December 17, 2022	Frank Gore Jr.	Southern Miss	RB
December 23, 2023	Gio Lopez	South Alabama	QB
December 26, 2024	Jaylen Raynor	Arkansas State	QB
December 26, 2024	Justin Parks	Arkansas State	S
December 26, 2024	Courtney Jackson	Arkansas State	PR/WR
December 17, 2025	Jo Silver	Delaware	RB

== Most appearances ==
Updated through the December 2025 edition (27 games, 54 total appearances).

Teams with multiple appearances

Rank	Team	Appearances	Record
1	Arkansas State	5	3–2
2	Bowling Green	4	1–3
3	Southern Miss	3	3–0
3	Miami (OH)	3	2–1
3	Toledo	3	2–1
3	Troy	3	2–1
7	Marshall	2	2–0
7	Tulsa	2	2–0
7	Louisiana	2	1–1
7	TCU	2	1–1
7	Ball State	2	0–2
7	East Carolina	2	0–2
7	Eastern Michigan	2	0–2
7	Louisville	2	0–2
7	Ohio	2	0–2

Teams with a single appearance

Won (8): Appalachian State, Central Michigan, Delaware, Georgia Southern, Georgia State, Liberty, Northern Illinois, South Alabama
Lost (7): Buffalo, Kent State, Memphis, Middle Tennessee State, Rice, UTEP, Western Kentucky

== Appearances by conference ==
Updated through the December 2025 edition (27 games, 54 total appearances).

Conference	Record				Appearances by season	
Conference	Games	W	L	Win pct.	Won	Lost
MAC	22	9	13	.409	2001, 2002, 2003, 2004, 2005, 2009*, 2010*, 2011*, 2014*	2006*, 2007*, 2008*, 2012*, 2013*, 2015, 2016, 2017, 2018, 2019*, 2021, 2023, 2024
Sun Belt	16	11	5	.688	2012*, 2013*, 2015, 2016, 2017, 2018, 2019*, 2020, 2022, 2023, 2024	2009*, 2010*, 2011*, 2014*, 2025
CUSA	13	5	8	.385	2000, 2006*, 2007*, 2008*, 2025	1999, 2001, 2002, 2003, 2004, 2005, 2020, 2022
WAC	2	1	1	.500	1999	2000
Independent	1	1	0	1.000	2021	

- Games marked with an asterisk (*) were played in January of the following calendar year.
- The WAC no longer sponsors FBS football.
- Independent appearances: Liberty (2021)

== Game records ==
Team	Record, Team vs. Opponent	Year
Most points scored (one team)	64, Marshall vs. East Carolina	2001
Most points scored (losing team)	61, East Carolina vs. Marshall	2001
Most points scored (both teams)	125, Marshall vs. East Carolina	2001
Fewest points allowed	0, Appalachian State vs. Toledo	2017
Largest margin of victory	56, Tulsa vs. Bowling Green	2008
Total yards	649, Marshall vs. East Carolina	2001
Rushing yards	482, Tulsa vs. Ball State	2009
Passing yards	576, Marshall vs. East Carolina	2001
First downs	36, Marshall vs. East Carolina	2001
Fewest yards allowed	146, Appalachian State vs. Toledo	2017
Fewest rushing yards allowed	–16, TCU vs. East Carolina	1999
Fewest passing yards allowed	73, South Alabama vs. Eastern Michigan	2023
Individual	Record, Player, Team vs. Opponent	Year
All-purpose yards	566, Byron Leftwich (Marshall)	2001
Touchdowns (all-purpose)	5, Kareem Hunt (Toledo)	Jan. 2015
Rushing yards	329, Frank Gore Jr. (Southern Miss)	2022
Rushing touchdowns	5, Kareem Hunt (Toledo)	Jan. 2015
Passing yards	576, Byron Leftwich (Marshall)	2001
Passing touchdowns	5, most recent: Fredi Knighten (Arkansas State)	Jan. 2015
Receptions	17, Harold Fannin Jr. (Bowling Green)	2024
Receiving yards	234, Denero Marriott (Marshall)	2001
Receiving touchdowns	3, most recent: Booker Mays (Arkansas State)	Jan. 2015
Tackles	17, Chris Chamberlain (Tulsa)	2008
Sacks	3, most recent: Daylen Gill (Southern Miss)	2022
Interceptions	2, Toran Davis (Ohio)	2016
Long plays	Record, Player, Team vs. Opponent	Year
Touchdown run	88 yds., Lionel Gates (Louisville)	2003
Touchdown pass	79 yds., Jaylen Raynor to Corey Rucker (Arkansas State)	2024
Kickoff return	95 yds., Antonio Brown (Central Michigan)	2010
Punt return	60 yds., Courtney Jackson (Arkansas State)	2024
Interception return	94 yds., Money Hunter (Arkansas State)	Jan. 2015
Fumble return	93 yds., Tyrone Hill (Buffalo)	2018
Punt	65 yds., Britt Barefoot (Southern Miss) †; 73 yds., Joseph Davidson (Bowling Green)	2007; Dec. 2015
Field goal	49 yds., Jesús Gómez (Eastern Michigan)	2023

† While listed in the record book as the bowl's longest punt, contemporary box scores indicate the longest punt happened in the December 2015 game.

== Media coverage ==
The bowl has been televised on ESPN or ESPN2 since its inception.
