= The Walkers =

The Walkers may refer to:

- The Walkers (Danish band), a glam-rock band formed in 1968
- The Walkers (Dutch band), a 1963–1989 skiffle and pop group
- The Walkers, the online fan community of Norwegian DJ and producer Alan Walker
- The Walker Brothers, an American pop group of the 1960s and 1970s
- The Walkers of Southgate, a 19th-century English cricketing family

== See also ==
- The WalkerZ, a YouTube web series
- Walkers (disambiguation)
- Walker (disambiguation), including "The Walker"
