= Walker Township, Indiana =

Walker Township, Indiana may refer to one of the following places:

- Walker Township, Jasper County, Indiana
- Walker Township, Rush County, Indiana

See also

- Walker Township (disambiguation)
