= 2025 Delaware Fightin' Blue Hens football team =

American college football season

2025 Delaware Fightin' Blue Hens football

68 Ventures Bowl champion

68 Ventures Bowl, W 20–13 vs. Louisiana
- Conference: Conference USA
- Record: 7–6 (4–4 CUSA)
- Head coach: Ryan Carty (4th season)
- Offensive coordinator: Terence Archer (2nd season)
- Offensive scheme: Spread option
- Defensive coordinator: Manny Rojas (6th season)
- Base defense: 3–3–5
- Home stadium: Delaware Stadium

2025 Conference USA football standings
	Conf.			Overall
Team	W		L	W		L
Kennesaw State y$	7	–	1	10	–	4
Jacksonville State y	7	–	1	9	–	5
Western Kentucky	6	–	2	9	–	4
Louisiana Tech	5	–	3	8	–	5
FIU	5	–	3	7	–	6
Missouri State	5	–	3	7	–	6
Delaware	4	–	4	7	–	6
Liberty	3	–	5	4	–	8
New Mexico State	2	–	6	4	–	8
Middle Tennessee	2	–	6	3	–	9
Sam Houston	1	–	7	2	–	10
UTEP	1	–	7	2	–	10
Championship: Kennesaw State 19, Jacksonville State 15
$ – Conference champion; y – Championship game participant

The 2025 Delaware Fightin' Blue Hens football team represented the University of Delaware as a member of the Conference USA (CUSA) during the 2025 NCAA Division I FBS football season. They were led by fourth-year head coach Ryan Carty and played their home games at Delaware Stadium in Newark, Delaware.

The 2025 season was Delaware's first year in Conference USA since transitioning from the NCAA Division I Football Championship Subdivision (FCS). Although initially declared ineligible for postseason play due to FCS-to-FBS transition rules, they participated in the 68 Ventures Bowl because there were not enough six-win teams eligible for the 42 FBS bowl games.

== Offseason ==
=== Transfers ===
==== Outgoing ====
Player	Position	Destination
Jalyn Witcher	WR	Arkansas–Pine Bluff
Daniel Lipovski	QB	Lafayette
Melkart Abou Jaoude	DL	North Carolina
Tyler Davis	S	Temple
JoJo Bermudez	WR	Temple
Pete Melle	DE	New Haven

==== Incoming ====
Player	Position	Previous school
Kahlil Ali	S	Boston College
Keontae Jenkins	DB	Coastal Carolina
Kyre Duplessis	WR	Coastal Carolina
Jawarren Corbin	LB	Iowa Central CC
Noah Matthews	DE	Kentucky
Brenden Lach	P	Michigan Tech
Thomas Amankwaa	WR	Rutgers
Noah Rosahac	OL	Syracuse
Viron Ellison Jr.	RB	Tulsa
Riley Trujillo	QB	UCF
Patrick Methlie	OL	West Chester
Brandon Rehmann	WR	West Virginia

== Schedule ==
Date	Time	Opponent	Site	TV	Result	Attendance
August 28	7:00 p.m.	Delaware State*	Delaware Stadium; Newark, DE (Route 1 Rivalry)	ESPN+	W 35–17	17,895
September 6	3:30 p.m.	at Colorado*	Folsom Field; Boulder, CO	FOX	L 7–31	50,341
September 13	3:00 p.m.	UConn*	Delaware Stadium; Newark, DE	ESPN+	W 44–41 ^{OT}	17,862
September 20	6:00 p.m.	at FIU	Pitbull Stadium; Miami, FL	ESPN+	W 38–16	11,705
October 3	7:00 p.m.	Western Kentucky	Delaware Stadium; Newark, DE	CBSSN	L 24–27	19,176
October 15	7:00 p.m.	at Jacksonville State	AmFirst Stadium; Jacksonville, AL	ESPN	L 25–38	16,884
October 22	7:30 p.m.	Middle Tennessee	Delaware Stadium; Newark, DE	ESPN2	W 31–28	14,102
November 1	3:30 p.m.	at Liberty	Williams Stadium; Lynchburg, VA	CBSSN	L 30–59	18,455
November 8	3:00 p.m.	Louisiana Tech^{†}	Delaware Stadium; Newark, DE	ESPN+	W 25–24	17,912
November 15	7:00 p.m.	at Sam Houston	Shell Energy Stadium; Houston, TX	ESPN+	L 23–26	3,713
November 22	12:00 p.m.	at Wake Forest*	Allegacy Federal Credit Union Stadium; Winston-Salem, NC	ACCN	L 14–52	26,950
November 29	1:00 p.m.	UTEP	Delaware Stadium; Newark, DE	ESPN+	W 61–31	13,560
December 17	8:30 p.m.	vs. Louisiana*	Hancock Whitney Stadium; Mobile, AL (68 Ventures Bowl)	ESPN	W 20–13	17,234
*Non-conference game; ^{†}Homecoming; All times are in Eastern time

== Game summaries ==
=== Delaware State (FCS, Route 1 Rivalry) ===
Game One – Delaware State Hornets (FCS) (0–0) at Delaware Fightin' Blue Hens (0–0) – Game summary

Quarter	1	2	3	4	Total
Hornets (FCS)	0	3	7	7	17
Fightin' Blue Hens	0	14	7	14	35

at Delaware Stadium • Newark, DE

- Date: August 28
- Game time: 7:00 p.m. EDT
- Game weather: Sunny, 76 °F (24 °C)
- Game attendance: 17,895
- Referee: Rory Bernard
- TV announcers (ESPN+): Scott Klatzkin (play-by-play) and Fritz Stueber (analyst)

Game information

First quarter

- No scoring plays.

Second quarter

- DSU – Patrick Fisher-Butler 40-yard field goal, 6:46. Hornets 3–0. Drive: 13 plays, 50 yards, 6:12.
- DEL – Nick Minicucci 8-yard run (Nate Reed kick), 3:44. Fightin' Blue Hens 7–3. Drive: 6 plays, 75 yards, 3:02.
- DEL – Kyre Duplessis 4-yard pass from Nick Minicucci (Nate Reed kick), 0:33. Fightin' Blue Hens 14–3. Drive: 11 plays, 77 yards, 2:07.

Third quarter

- DSU – Kaiden Bennett 23-yard run (Patrick Fisher-Butler kick), 10:29. Fightin' Blue Hens 14–10. Drive: 11 plays, 75 yards, 4:31.
- DEL – Ja'Carree Kelly 9-yard pass from Nick Minicucci (Nate Reed kick), 7:15. Fightin' Blue Hens 21–10. Drive: 7 plays, 34 yards, 3:01.

Fourth quarter

- DEL – Kahlil Ali 45-yard interception return (Nate Reed kick), 10:44. Fightin' Blue Hens 28–10.
- DSU – Marquis Gillis 39-yard pass from Kaiden Bennett (Patrick Fisher-Butler kick), 8:10. Fightin' Blue Hens 28–17. Drive: 6 plays, 76 yards, 2:25.
- DEL – Jake Thaw 50-yard pass from Nick Minicucci (Nate Reed kick), 6:15. Fightin' Blue Hens 35–17. Drive: 5 plays, 60 yards, 1:55.

Statistics	DSU	DEL
First downs	21	26
Plays–yards	67–349	70–409
Rushes–yards	41–200	26–137
Passing yards	149	272
Passing: Comp–Att–Int	13–26–2	31–44–0
Turnovers	2	1
Time of possession	31:53	28:07

Team	Category	Player	Statistics
Delaware State	Passing	Kaiden Bennett	11/23, 135 yards, TD, INT
Delaware State	Rushing	Marquis Gillis	17 carries, 123 yards
Delaware State	Receiving	Marquis Gillis	3 receptions, 46 yards, TD
Delaware	Passing	Nick Minicucci	28/36, 251 yards, 3 TD
Delaware	Rushing	Nick Minicucci	9 carries, 44 yards, TD
Delaware	Receiving	Jake Thaw	7 receptions, 92 yards, TD

=== at Colorado ===
Game Two – Delaware Fightin' Blue Hens (1–0) at Colorado Buffaloes (0–1) – Game summary

Quarter	1	2	3	4	Total
Fightin' Blue Hens	0	7	0	0	7
Buffaloes	7	10	7	7	31

at Folsom Field • Boulder, CO

- Date: September 6
- Game time: 3:30 p.m. EDT/1:30 p.m. MDT
- Game weather: Sunny, 75 °F (24 °C)
- Game attendance: 50,341
- Referee: Kevin Boitmann
- TV announcers (FOX): Jason Benetti (play-by-play), Robert Griffin III (analyst), Alexa Landestoy (reporter)

Game information

First quarter

- COLO – Kaidon Salter 9-yard run (Alejandro Mata kick), 5:33. Buffaloes 7–3. Drive: 12 plays, 87 yards, 6:06.

Second quarter

- COLO – Alejandro Mata 28-yard field goal, 13:03. Buffaloes 10–0. Drive: 12 plays, 43 yards, 3:59.
- DEL – Jo Silver 4-yard pass from Nick Minicucci (Nate Reed kick) 0:45. Buffaloes 10–7. Drive: 7 plays, 80 yards, 2:54.
- COLO – DeKalon Taylor 21-yard pass from Ryan Staub (Alejandro Mata kick) 0:09. Buffaloes 17–7. Drive: 6 plays, 75 yards, 0:36.

Third quarter

- COLO – Sincere Brown 71-yard pass from Ryan Staub (Alejandro Mata kick) 13:46. Buffaloes 24–7. Drive: 3 plays, 75 yards, 1:14.

Fourth quarter

- COLO – Micah Welch 10-yard run (Alejandro Mata kick), 14:13. Buffaloes 31–7. Drive: 5 plays, 24 yards, 2:23.

Statistics	DEL	COLO
First downs	19	21
Plays–yards	66–396	70–398
Rushes–yards	30–84	39–131
Passing yards	312	267
Passing: comp–att–int	18–36–1	22–31–0
Turnovers	3	0
Time of possession	27:03	32:57

Team	Category	Player	Statistics
Delaware	Passing	Nick Minicucci	18/36, 312 yards, TD, INT
Delaware	Rushing	Jo Silver	11 carries, 47 yards
Delaware	Receiving	Jake Thaw	4 receptions, 85 yards
Colorado	Passing	Ryan Staub	7/10, 157 yards, 2 TD
Colorado	Rushing	Simeon Price	9 carries, 56 yards
Colorado	Receiving	Sincere Brown	4 receptions, 120 yards, TD

=== UConn ===
Game Three – UConn Huskies (1–1) at Delaware Fightin' Blue Hens (1–1) – Game summary

Quarter	1	2	3	4	OT	Total
Huskies	10	14	7	7	3	41
Fightin' Blue Hens	14	14	7	3	6	44

at Delaware Stadium • Newark, DE

- Date: September 13
- Game time: 3:00 p.m. EDT
- Game weather: Sunny, 81 °F (27 °C)
- Game attendance: 17,862
- Referee: Rodney Burnette
- TV announcers (ESPN+): Scott Klatzkin (play-by-play) and Fritz Stueber (analyst)

Game information

First quarter

- DEL - Nick Minicucci 3-yard run (Nate Reed kick), 11:13. Fightin' Blue Hens 7–0. Drive: 7 plays, 73 yards, 02:34.
- CONN - Cam Edwards 51-yard run (Chris Freeman kick), 8:48. Tied 7–7. Drive: 6 plays, 75 yards, 02:25.
- DEL - Jo Silver 70-yard run (Nate Reed kick), 8:06. Fightin' Blue Hens 14–7. Drive: 2 plays, 75 yards, 00:42.
- CONN - Chris Freeman 28-yard field goal, 4:48. Fightin' Blue Hens 14–10. Drive: 8 plays, 65 yards, 03:18.

Second quarter

- DEL - Nick Minicucci 5-yard run (Nate Reed kick), 12:54. Fightin' Blue Hens 21–10. Drive: 12 plays, 79 yards, 06:47.
- CONN - Victor Rosa 31-yard run (Chris Freeman kick), 10:08. Fightin' Blue Hens 21–17. Drive: 7 plays, 73 yards, 02:37.
- CONN - Cam Edwards 2-yard run (Chris Freeman kick), 7:17. Huskies 24–21. Drive: 7 plays, 83 yards, 01:23.
- DEL - Kyre Duplessis 68-yard pass from Nick Minicucci (Nate Reed kick), 5:55. Fightin' Blue Hens 28–24. Drive: 3 plays, 75 yards, 01:22.

Third quarter

- CONN - Reymello Murphy 10-yard pass from Joe Fagnano (Chris Freeman kick), 5:05. Huskies 31–28. Drive: 7 plays, 79 yards, 02:47.
- DEL - Jo Silver 18-yard run (Nate Reed kick), 0:00. Fightin' Blue Hens 35–31. Drive: 11 plays, 75 yards, 05:05.

Fourth quarter

- CONN - Alex Honig 1-yard pass from Joe Fagnano (Chris Freeman kick), 9:54. Huskies 38–35. Drive: 10 plays, 75 yards, 05:06.
- DEL - Nate Reed 43-yard field goal, 0:00. Tied 38–38. Drive: 11 plays, 52 yards, 02:10.

Overtime

- CONN - Chris Freeman 24-yard field goal. Huskies 41–38. Drive: 6 plays, 19 yards.
- DEL - Nick Minicucci 13-yard run. Fightin' Blue Hens 44–41. Drive: 4 plays, 25 yards.

Statistics	CONN	DEL
First downs	29	29
Plays–yards	71–521	79–512
Rushes–yards	32–175	45–247
Passing yards	346	265
Passing: Comp–Att–Int	28-39-0	23-34-0
Turnovers	0	0
Time of possession	27:35	32:25

Team	Category	Player	Statistics
UConn	Passing	Joe Fagnano	28/38, 346 yards, 2 TD
UConn	Rushing	Cam Edwards	23 carries, 116 yards, 2 TD
UConn	Receiving	Skyler Bell	7 receptions, 92 yards
Delaware	Passing	Nick Minicucci	23/34, 265 yards, TD
Delaware	Rushing	Jo Silver	15 carries, 179 yards, 2 TD
Delaware	Receiving	Kyre Duplessis	9 receptions, 161 yards, TD

=== at FIU ===
Game Four – Delaware Fightin' Blue Hens (2–1) at FIU Panthers (2–1) – Game summary

Quarter	1	2	3	4	Total
Fightin' Blue Hens	3	21	7	7	38
Panthers	7	0	3	6	16

at Pitbull Stadium • Miami, FL

- Date: September 20
- Game time: 6:00 pm EDT
- Game weather: Cloudy, 83 °F (28 °C)
- Game attendance: 11,705
- Referee: Rory Bernard
- TV announcers (ESPN+): Steve Goldstein (play-by-play), and Kim Bokamper (analyst)

Game information

First quarter

- DEL – Nate Reed 24-yard field goal, 9:31. Fightin' Blue Hens 3–0. Drive: 12 plays, 68 yards, 5:29.
- FIU – Keyone Jenkins 2-yard run (Robert Czeremcha kick), 3:32. Panthers 7–3. Drive: 3 plays, 54 yards, 0:45.

Second quarter

- DEL – Jo Silver 14-yard run (Nate Reed kick), 11:55. Fightin' Blue Hens 10–7. Drive: 5 plays, 55 yards, 2:13.
- DEL – Nick Laboy 2-yard pass from Nick Minicucci (Nate Reed kick), 4:26. Fightin' Blue Hens 17–7. Drive: 8 plays, 77 yards, 3:01.
- DEL – Kyre Duplessis 68-yard punt return (Nate Reed kick), 2:37. Fightin' Blue Hens 24–7.

Third quarter

- FIU – Robert Czeremcha 35-yard field goal, 9:24. Fightin' Blue Hens 24–10. Drive: 13 plays, 59 yards, 5:27.
- DEL – Nick Laboy 14-yard pass from Nick Minicucci (Nate Reed kick), 2:53. Fightin' Blue Hens 31–10. Drive: 12 plays, 79 yards, 6:33.

Fourth quarter

- FIU – Alex Perry 5-yard pass from Keyone Jenkins (run failed), 12:22. Fightin' Blue Hens 31–16. Drive: 11 plays, 75 yards, 5:31.
- DEL – Viron Ellison Jr. 9-yard pass from Nick Minicucci (Nate Reed kick), 4:45. Fightin' Blue Hens 38–16. Drive: 15 plays, 81 yards, 7:31.

Statistics	DEL	FIU
First downs	24	14
Plays–yards	66–358	69–363
Rushes–yards	31–140	34–160
Passing yards	218	203
Passing: Comp–Att–Int	23–35–1	22–35–2
Turnovers	1	2
Time of possession	30:31	29:29

Team	Category	Player	Statistics
Delaware	Passing	Nick Minicucci	23/35, 218 yards, 3 TD, INT
Delaware	Rushing	Jo Silver	13 carries, 66 yards, TD
Delaware	Receiving	Sean Wilson	7 receptions, 78 yards
FIU	Passing	Keyone Jenkins	22/34, 203 yards, TD, 2 INT
FIU	Rushing	Kejon Owens	15 carries, 74 yards
FIU	Receiving	Alex Perry	5 receptions, 84 yards, TD

=== Western Kentucky ===
Game Five – Western Kentucky Hilltoppers (4–1) at Delaware Fightin' Blue Hens (3–1) – Game summary

Quarter	1	2	3	4	Total
Hilltoppers	0	10	17	0	27
Fightin' Blue Hens	7	10	0	7	24

at Delaware Stadium • Newark, DE

- Date: October 3
- Game time: 7:00 p.m. EDT
- Game weather: Clear, 64 °F (18 °C)
- Game attendance: 19,179
- Referee: Ron Hudson
- TV announcers (CBSSN): John Sadak (play-by-play), Kyle Long (analyst), and Patrick Peterson (sideline)

Game information

First quarter

- (8:36) DEL – Nick Minicucci 2-yard run (Nate Reed kick). Fightin' Blue Hens 7–0. Drive: 15 plays, 75 yards, 6:24.

Second quarter

- (14:55) WKU – John Cannon 41-yard field goal. Fightin' Blue Hens 7–3. Drive: 8 plays, 55 yards, 3:36.
- (7:55) DEL – Nate Reed 23-yard field goal. Fightin' Blue Hens 10–3. Drive: 14 plays, 69 yards, 6:52.
- (1:55) WKU – K.D. Hutchinson 5-yard run (John Cannon kick). Tied 10–10. Drive: 13 plays, 75 yards, 6:00.
- (0:00) DEL – Nick Minicucci 1-yd run (Nate Reed kick). Fightin' Blue Hens 17–10. Drive: 7 plays, 61 yards, 1:47.

Third quarter

- (8:01) WKU – John Cannon 43-yard field goal. Fightin' Blue Hens 17–13. Drive: 8 plays, 31 yards, 2:57.
- (7:20) WKU – Koron Hayward 25-yard interception return (John Cannon kick). Hilltoppers 20–17.
- (0:38) WKU – George Hart III 5-yard pass from Maverick McIvor (John Cannon kick). Hilltoppers 27-17. Drive: 9 plays, 80 yards, 4:09.

Fourth quarter

- (9:54) DEL – Nick Minicucci 2-yard run (Nate Reed kick). Hilltoppers 27-24. Drive: 13 plays, 75 yards, 5:44.

Statistics	WKU	DEL
First downs	16	27
Plays–yards	57–338	80–435
Rushes–yards	26–108	34–121
Passing yards	230	314
Passing: Comp–Att–Int	23-31-0	28-46-1
Turnovers	1	2
Time of possession	27:26	32:34

Team	Category	Player	Statistics
Western Kentucky	Passing	Maverick McIvor	23/31, 230 yds, TD
Western Kentucky	Rushing	Maverick McIvor	6 carries, 36 yards
Western Kentucky	Receiving	Matthew Henry	4 receptions, 99 yards
Delaware	Passing	Nick Minicucci	28/45, 314 yds, INT
Delaware	Rushing	Nick Minicucci	12 carries, 55 yards, 3 TD
Delaware	Receiving	2 Tied	55 yards

=== at Jacksonville State ===
Game Six – Delaware Fightin' Blue Hens (3–2) at Jacksonville State Gamecocks (3–3) – Game summary

Quarter	1	2	3	4	Total
Fightin' Blue Hens	0	6	6	13	25
Gamecocks	7	14	14	3	38

at AmFirst Stadium • Jacksonville, AL

- Date: October 15
- Game time: 7:00 p.m. EDT
- Game weather: Clear • Wind: SW 5 mph
- Game attendance: 16,884
- Referee: Reed Brotherton
- TV announcers (ESPN): Clay Matvick (play-by-play) and Chase Daniel (analyst)

Game information

First quarter

- (9:27) JVST – Cam Cook 6-yard run, Garrison Rippa kick (Drive: 1 play, 11 yards, 0:40; Jacksonville State 7–0)

Second quarter

- (10:37) JVST – Caleb Nix 45-yard fumble recovery, Garrison Rippa kick (Jacksonville State 14–0)
- (8:16) JVST – Brock Rechsteiner 23-yard pass from Caden Creel, Garrison Rippa kick (Drive: 3 plays, 48 yards, 1:21; Jacksonville State 21–0)
- (2:23) DEL – Viron Ellison Jr. 1-yard run (Drive: 4 plays, 83 yards, 1:16; Jacksonville State 21–6)

Third quarter

- (8:44) JVST – Cam Cook 1-yard run, Garrison Rippa kick (Drive: 8 plays, 81 yards, 3:19; Jacksonville State 28–6)
- (3:20) JVST – Cam Cook 2-yard run, Garrison Rippa kick (Drive: 6 plays, 43 yards, 2:56; Jacksonville State 35–6)
- (1:41) DEL – Max Patterson 21-yard pass from Nick Minicucci (Drive: 4 plays, 75 yards, 1:39; Jacksonville State 35–12)

Fourth quarter

- (11:57) JVST – Garrison Rippa 52-yard field goal (Drive: 9 plays, 40 yards, 4:44; Jacksonville State 38–12)
- (9:25) DEL – Viron Ellison Jr. 2-yard run, Nate Reed kick (Drive: 8 plays, 65 yards, 2:32; Jacksonville State 38–19)
- (2:52) DEL – Viron Ellison Jr. 4-yard run (Drive: 8 plays, 95 yards, 2:57; Jacksonville State 38–25)

Statistics	DEL	JVST
First downs	22	24
Plays–yards	72–456	66–388
Rushes–yards	22–34	50–255
Passing yards	422	133
Passing: Comp–Att–Int	32–50–0	16–24–0
Turnovers	2	0
Time of possession	26:38	33:22

Team	Category	Player	Statistics
Delaware	Passing	Nick Minicucci	32/50, 422 yards, TD
Delaware	Rushing	Viron Ellison Jr.	8 carries, 15 yards, 3 TD
Delaware	Receiving	Kyre Duplessis	6 receptions, 90 yards
Jacksonville State	Passing	Caden Creel	14/21, 116 yards, TD
Jacksonville State	Rushing	Cam Cook	18 carries, 117 yards, 3 TD
Jacksonville State	Receiving	Brock Rechsteiner	3 receptions, 48 yards, TD

=== Middle Tennessee ===
Game Seven – Middle Tennessee Blue Raiders (1–5) at Delaware Fightin' Blue Hens (3–3) – Game summary

Quarter	1	2	3	4	Total
Blue Raiders	14	0	7	7	28
Fightin' Blue Hens	7	17	7	0	31

at Delaware Stadium • Newark, DE

- Date: October 22
- Game time: 7:30 p.m. EDT
- Game weather: Clear, 56 °F (13 °C)
- Game attendance: 14,102
- Referee: Garrett Dickerson
- TV announcers (ESPN2): Jay Alter (play-by-play) and Rocky Boiman (analyst)

Game information

First quarter

- (8:28) DEL – Sean Wilson 22-yard pass from Nick Minicucci, Nate Reed kick (Drive: 10 plays, 89 yards, 5:08; Delaware 7–0)
- (2:59) MTSU – Nahzae Cox 5-yard pass from Nicholas Vattiato, Jacob Hathaway kick (Drive: 12 plays, 76 yards, 5:24; Tied 7–7)
- (1:58) MTSU – Jekail Middlebrook 4-yard run, Jacob Hathaway kick (Drive: 2 plays, 17 yards, 0:51; Middle Tennessee 14–7)

Second quarter

- (11:39) DEL – Sean Wilson 10-yard pass from Nick Minicucci, Nate Reed kick (Drive: 11 plays, 75 yards, 5:19; Tied 14–14)
- (6:25) DEL – Nate Reed 49-yard field goal (Drive: 11 plays, 48 yards, 3:26; Delaware 17–14)
- (0:38) DEL – Kyre Duplessis 4-yard pass from Nick Minicucci, Nate Reed kick (Drive: 10 plays, 78 yards, 1:35; Delaware 24–14)

Third quarter

- (5:11) MTSU – Hunter Tipton 11-yard pass from Nicholas Vattiato, Jacob Hathaway kick (Drive: 5 plays, 39 yards, 1:41; Delaware 24–21)
- (1:39) DEL – Kyre Duplessis 9-yard pass from Nick Minicucci, Nate Reed kick (Drive: 9 plays, 75 yards, 3:32; Delaware 31–21)

Fourth quarter

- (1:03) MTSU – AJ Jones 6-yard pass from Nicholas Vattiato, Jacob Hathaway kick (Drive: 11 plays, 89 yards, 1:35; Delaware 31–28)

Statistics	MTSU	DEL
First downs	24	27
Plays–yards	72–384	80–360
Rushes–yards	22–103	36–79
Passing yards	281	281
Passing: Comp–Att–Int	31–50–1	28–44–1
Turnovers	2	2
Time of possession	27:05	32:55

Team	Category	Player	Statistics
Middle Tennessee	Passing	Nicholas Vattiato	31/48, 281 yards, 3 TD, INT
Middle Tennessee	Rushing	Jekail Middlebrook	11 carries, 68 yards, TD
Middle Tennessee	Receiving	Hunter Tipton	5 receptions, 56 yards, TD
Delaware	Passing	Nick Minicucci	27/42, 276 yards, 4 TD
Delaware	Rushing	Jo Silver	14 carries, 51 yards
Delaware	Receiving	Kyre Duplessis	7 receptions, 65 yards, 2 TD

=== at Liberty ===
Game Eight – Delaware Fightin' Blue Hens (4–3) at Liberty Flames (3–4) – Game summary

Quarter	1	2	3	4	Total
Fightin' Blue Hens	3	6	15	6	30
Flames	7	21	21	10	59

at Williams Stadium • Lynchburg, VA

- Date: November 1
- Game time: 3:30 p.m. EDT
- Game weather: Sunny • Temperature: 63 °F (17 °C) • Wind: W at 5 miles per hour (8.0 km/h)
- Game attendance: 18,455
- Referee: Ron Hudson
- TV announcers (CBSSN): Dave Ryan (play-by-play), Adam Breneman (analyst), and Patrick Peterson (sideline)

Game information

First quarter

- (11:29) DEL – Nate Reed 42-yard field goal (Drive: 9 plays, 50 yards, 3:31; Delaware 3–0)
- (6:02) LIB – Ethan Vasko 15-yard run, Jay Billingsley kick (Drive: 10 plays, 75 yards, 5:27; Liberty 7–3)

Second quarter

- (14:05) DEL – Nate Reed 28-yard field goal (Drive: 15 plays, 64 yards, 6:57; Liberty 7–6)
- (11:18) LIB – Evan Dickens 5-yard run, Jay Billingsley kick (Drive: 2 plays, 21 yards, 0:16; Liberty 14–6)
- (2:57) LIB – Evan Dickens 1-yard run, Jay Billingsley kick (Drive: 13 plays, 79 yards, 6:53; Liberty 21–6)
- (1:39) LIB – Evan Dickens 30-yard run, Jay Billingsley kick (Drive: 2 plays, 30 yards, 0:13; Liberty 28–6)
- (0:00) DEL – Nate Reed 42-yard field goal (Drive: 9 plays, 50 yards, 1:39; Liberty 28–9)

Third quarter

- (14:30) LIB – Evan Dickens 72-yard run, Jay Billingsley kick (Drive: 2 plays, 75 yards, 0:30; Liberty 35–9)
- (12:58) DEL – Elijah Sessoms 8-yard pass from Nick Minicucci, Nate Reed kick (Drive: 5 plays, 69 yards, 1:24; Liberty 35–16)
- (5:49) DEL – Donovan Lewis 3-yard pass from Nick Minicucci, Nate Reed kick (Drive: 12 plays, 57 yards, 4:14; Liberty 35–24)
- (3:07) LIB – Jacob Jenkins 15-yard pass from Ethan Vasko, Jay Billingsley kick (Drive: 5 plays, 75 yards, 2:42; Liberty 42–24)
- (0:28) LIB – Donte Lee Jr. 31-yard pass from Ethan Vasko, Jay Billingsley kick (Drive: 2 plays, 34 yards, 0:39; Liberty 49–24)

Fourth quarter

- (12:57) DEL – Nick Minicucci 12-yard run (Drive: 7 plays, 69 yards, 2:22; Liberty 49–30)
- (9:05) LIB – Vaughn Blue 12-yard run, Jay Billingsley kick (Drive: 7 plays, 75 yards, 3:52; Liberty 56–30)
- (4:49) LIB – Brayden Beck 32-yard field goal (Drive: 7 plays, 46 yards, 3:24; Liberty 59–30)

Statistics	DEL	LIB
First downs	18	25
Plays–yards	75–420	64–561
Rushes–yards	26–76	41–282
Passing yards	344	279
Passing: Comp–Att–Int	29–49–1	16–23–0
Turnovers	1	0
Time of possession	28:30	31:30

Team	Category	Player	Statistics
Delaware	Passing	Nick Minicucci	29/49, 344 yards, 2 TD, INT
Delaware	Rushing	Nick Minicucci	8 carries, 37 yards, TD
Delaware	Receiving	Sean Wilson	5 receptions, 109 yards
Liberty	Passing	Ethan Vasko	14/20, 221 yards, 2 TD
Liberty	Rushing	Evan Dickens	22 carries, 217 yards, 4 TD
Liberty	Receiving	Donte Lee Jr.	5 receptions, 92 yards, TD

=== Louisiana Tech ===
Game Nine – Louisiana Tech Bulldogs (5–3) at Delaware Fightin' Blue Hens (4–4) – Game summary

Quarter	1	2	3	4	Total
Bulldogs	7	0	0	17	24
Fightin' Blue Hens	3	6	7	9	25

at Delaware Stadium • Newark, DE

- Date: November 8
- Game time: 3:00 p.m. EDT
- Game weather: Sunny, 66 °F (19 °C)
- Game attendance: 17,912
- Referee: Rodney Burnette
- TV announcers (ESPN+): Scott Klatzkin (play-by-play) and Pat Devlin (analyst)

Game information

First quarter

- DEL – Nate Reed 28-yard field goal, 2:59. Fightin' Blue Hens 3–0. Drive: 10 plays, 69 yards, 4:48.
- LT – Clay Thevenin 37-yard run (Drew Henderson kick), 0:06. Bulldogs 7–3. Drive: 7 plays, 75 yards, 2:53.

Second quarter

- DEL – Nate Reed 41-yard field goal, 11:05. Bulldogs 7–6. Drive: 11 plays, 51 yards, 4:01.
- DEL – Nate Reed 27-yard field goal, 0:07. Fightin' Blue Hens 9–7. Drive: 9 plays, 59 yards, 1:48.

Third quarter

- DEL – Kyre Duplessis 14-yard pass from Nick Minicucci (Nate Reed kick), 2:44. Fightin' Blue Hens 16–7. Drive: 9 plays, 96 yards, 4:19.

Fourth quarter

- LT – Drew Henderson 22-yard field goal, 9:09. Fightin' Blue Hens 16–10. Drive: 14 plays, 55 yards, 8:35.
- LT – Clay Thevenin 13-yard run (Drew Henderson kick), 3:09. Bulldogs 17–16. Drive: 8 plays, 39 yards, 3:32.
- LT – Jacob Fields 38-yard interception return (Drew Henderson kick), 2:23. Bulldogs 24–16.
- DEL – Elijah Sessoms 3-yard pass from Nick Minicucci (pass failed), 0:34. Bulldogs 24–22. Drive: 8 plays, 75 yards, 1:49.
- DEL – Nate Reed 51-yard field goal, 0:12. Fightin' Blue Hens 25–24. Drive: 4 plays, 6 yards, 0:21.

Statistics	LT	DEL
First downs	22	21
Plays–yards	59–333	76–399
Rushes–yards	34–131	24–95
Passing yards	202	304
Passing: Comp–Att–Int	18–25–1	26–52–2
Turnovers	1	2
Time of possession	30:03	29:57

Team	Category	Player	Statistics
Louisiana Tech	Passing	Evan Bullock	11/15, 95 yards, INT
Louisiana Tech	Rushing	Clay Thevenin	10 carries, 64 yards, 2 TD
Louisiana Tech	Receiving	Jalem Mickens	4 receptions, 42 yards
Delaware	Passing	Nick Minicucci	26/52, 304 yards, 2 TD, 2 INT
Delaware	Rushing	Nick Minicucci	9 carries, 55 yards
Delaware	Receiving	Sean Wilson	5 receptions, 107 yards

=== at Sam Houston ===
Game Ten – Delaware Fightin' Blue Hens (5–4) at Sam Houston Bearkats (1–8) – Game summary

Quarter	1	2	3	4	Total
Fightin' Blue Hens	7	3	0	13	23
Bearkats	0	10	13	3	26

at Shell Energy Stadium • Houston, TX

- Date: November 15
- Game time: 7:00 p.m. EST/6:00 p.m. CST
- Game weather: Clear, 77 °F (25 °C)
- Game attendance: 3,713
- Referee: Douglas Mercer
- TV announcers (ESPN+): Matt Pedersen, Jason Barfield, and Brooke Kirchhofer

Game information

First quarter

- DEL – Nick Minicucci 7-yard run (Nate Reed kick), 2:14. Fightin' Blue Hens 7–0. Drive: 8 plays, 88 yards, 3:29.

Second quarter

- DEL – Nate Reed 37-yard field goal, 9:20. Fightin' Blue Hens 10–0. Drive: 12 plays, 60 yards, 5:30.
- SHSU – Landan Brown 2-yard run (Christian Pavon kick), 2:35. Fightin' Blue Hens 10–7. Drive: 4 plays, 47 yards, 1:35.
- SHSU – Christian Pavon 33-yard field goal, 0:00. Tied 10–10. Drive: 10 plays, 47 yards, 1:43.

Third quarter

- SHSU – Christian Pavon 48-yard field goal, 11:22. Bearkats 13–10. Drive: 9 plays, 55 yards, 3:33.
- SHSU – Landan Brown 62-yard run (Christian Pavon kick), 8:34. Bearkats 20–10. Drive: 2 plays, 67 yards, 0:38.
- SHSU – Christian Pavon 23-yard field goal, 3:52. Bearkats 23–10. Drive: 6 plays, 44 yards, 3:24.

Fourth quarter

- SHSU – Christian Pavon 48-yard field goal, 11:58. Bearkats 26–10. Drive: 4 plays, -10 yards, 1:37.
- DEL – Viron Ellison Jr. 3-yard run (pass failed), 8:47. Bearkats 26–16. Drive: 9 plays, 75 yards, 3:11.
- DEL – Max Patterson 26-yard pass from Nick Minicucci (Nate Reed kick), 2:36. Bearkats 26–23. Drive: 6 plays, 78 yards, 1:37.

Statistics	DEL	SHSU
First downs	25	20
Plays–yards	75–433	68–352
Rushes–yards	39–95	29–139
Passing yards	338	213
Passing: Comp–Att–Int	24–36–1	16–39–0
Turnovers	3	0
Time of possession	32:06	27:54

Team	Category	Player	Statistics
Delaware	Passing	Nick Minicucci	24/36, 338 yards, TD, INT
Delaware	Rushing	Viron Ellison Jr.	19 carries, 97 yards, TD
Delaware	Receiving	Sean Wilson	9 receptions, 162 yards
Sam Houston	Passing	Landyn Locke	16/38, 213 yards
Sam Houston	Rushing	Landan Brown	10 carries, 109 yards, 2 TD
Sam Houston	Receiving	Chris Reed	2 receptions, 66 yards

=== at Wake Forest ===
Game Eleven – Delaware Fightin' Blue Hens (5–5) at Wake Forest Demon Deacons (7–3) – Game summary

Quarter	1	2	3	4	Total
Fightin' Blue Hens	0	7	0	7	14
Demon Deacons	15	20	14	3	52

at Allegacy Federal Credit Union Stadium • Winston-Salem, NC

- Date: November 22
- Game time: 12:00 p.m. EST
- Game weather: Sunny, 68 °F (20 °C)
- Game attendance: 26,950
- Referee: Jon Noli
- TV announcers (ACCN): Jorge Sedano, Rodney McLeod, and Victoria Arlen

Game information

First quarter

- WF – Demond Claiborne 1-yard run (Connor Calvert kick), 7:08. Demon Deacons 7–0. Drive: 15 plays, 76 yards, 5:58.
- WF – Ty Clark III 13-yard run (Sawyer Racanelli run), 2:13. Demon Deacons 15–0. Drive: 9 plays, 59 yards, 3:29.

Second quarter

- DEL – Viron Ellison Jr. 43-yard pass from Nick Minicucci (Nate Reed kick), 12:47. Demon Deacons 15–7. Drive: 10 plays, 75 yards, 4:26.
- WF – Connor Calvert 44-yard field goal, 9:40. Demon Deacons 18–7. Drive: 7 plays, 48 yards, 3:07.
- WF – Robby Ashford 4-yard run (Connor Calvert kick), 4:39. Demon Deacons 25–7. Drive: 4 plays, 88 yards, 1:25.
- WF – Connor Calvert 44-yard field goal, 2:15. Demon Deacons 28–7. Drive: 5 plays, -8 yards, 2:19.
- WF – Carlos Hernandez 79-yard pass from Robby Ashford (Matthew Dennis kick), 0:19. Demon Deacons 35–7. Drive: 1 play, 79 yards, 0:10.

Third quarter

- WF – Sterling Berkhalter 19-yard pass from Robby Ashford (Matthew Dennis kick), 10:08. Demon Deacons 42–7. Drive: 8 plays, 80 yards, 4:49.
- WF – Carlos Hernandez 93-yard pass from Robby Ashford (Matthew Dennis kick), 3:37. Demon Deacons 49–7. Drive: 2 plays, 92 yards, 0:44.

Fourth quarter

- WF – Connor Calvert 47-yard field goal, 8:44. Demon Deacons 52–7. Drive: 8 plays, 33 yards, 3:10.
- DEL – Max Patterson 25-yard pass from Braden Streeter (Nate Reed kick), 1:59. Demon Deacons 52–14. Drive: 13 plays, 82 yards, 6:41.

Statistics	DEL	WAKE
First downs	19	21
Plays–yards	76–300	60–577
Rushes–yards	29–67	34–263
Passing yards	233	314
Passing: comp–att–int	32–47–0	16–26–2
Turnovers	2	2
Time of possession	33:03	26:57

Team	Category	Player	Statistics
Delaware	Passing	Nick Minicucci	21/30, 140 yards, TD
Delaware	Rushing	Viron Ellison Jr.	9 carries, 34 yards
Delaware	Receiving	Viron Ellison Jr.	7 receptions, 60 yards, TD
Wake Forest	Passing	Robby Ashford	15/22, 292 yards, 3 TD, INT
Wake Forest	Rushing	Chris Barnes	1 carry, 78 yards
Wake Forest	Receiving	Carlos Hernandez	5 receptions, 197 yards, 2 TD

=== UTEP ===
Game Twelve – UTEP Miners (2–9) at Delaware Fightin' Blue Hens (5–6) – Game summary

Quarter	1	2	3	4	Total
Miners	7	13	11	0	31
Fightin' Blue Hens	7	24	10	20	61

at Delaware Stadium • Newark, DE

- Date: November 29
- Game time: 1:00 p.m. EST
- Game weather: Sunny, 42 °F (6 °C)
- Game attendance: 13,560
- Referee: Rory Bernard
- TV announcers (ESPN+): Scott Klatzkin (play-by-play) and Pat Devlin (analyst)

Game information

First quarter

- DEL – Nick Minicucci 17-yard run (Nate Reed kick), 11:11. Fightin' Blue Hens 7–0. Drive: 9 plays, 50 yards, 3:40.
- UTEP – Kenny Odom 49-yard pass from Skyler Locklear (Carlos Arreola kick), 11:11. Tied 7–7. Drive: 6 plays, 35 yards, 2:20.

Second quarter

- DEL – Scott Moore 4-yard pass from Nick Minicucci (Nate Reed kick), 15:00. Fightin' Blue Hens 14–7. Drive: 9 plays, 69 yards, 4:04.
- DEL – Nate Reed 37-yard field goal, 10:24. Fightin' Blue Hens 17–7. Drive: 5 plays, 22 yards, 1:30.
- DEL – Gavin Moul 16-yard fumble return (Nate Reed kick), 9:09. Fightin' Blue Hens 24–7.
- UTEP – Josh Schuchts 64-yard pass from Skyler Locklear (Carlos Arreola kick), 5:05. Fightin' Blue Hens 24–14. Drive: 2 plays, 70 yards, 0:36.
- DEL – Jo Silver 2-yard run (Nate Reed kick), 2:01. Fightin' Blue Hens 31–14. Drive: 6 plays, 62 yards, 2:58.
- UTEP – Eric Willis III 2-yard pass from Skyler Locklear (pass failed), 0:41. Fightin' Blue Hens 31–20. Drive: 8 plays, 59 yards, 0:59.

Third quarter

- UTEP – Tanner Cragun 28-yard field goal, 5:25. Fightin' Blue Hens 31–23. Drive: 8 plays, 56 yards, 3:34.
- DEL – Jake Thaw 51-yard pass from Nick Minicucci (Nate Reed kick), 4:38. Fightin' Blue Hens 38–23. Drive: 2 plays, 69 yards, 0:42.
- DEL – Nate Reed 20-yard field goal, 2:04. Fightin' Blue Hens 41–23. Drive: 5 plays, 38 yards, 2:14.
- UTEP – Wondame Davis Jr. 68-yard pass from Skyler Locklear (Skyler Locklear pass to Jaylan Brown), 1:09. Fightin' Blue Hens 41–31. Drive: 3 plays, 75 yards, 0:55.

Fourth quarter

- DEL – Jake Thaw 7-yard pass from Nick Minicucci (Nate Reed kick), 8:02. Fightin' Blue Hens 48–31. Drive: 8 plays, 65 yards, 3:29.
- DEL – Greg Spiller 55-yard run (Nate Reed kick), 4:25. Fightin' Blue Hens 55–31. Drive: 2 plays, 60 yards, 0:55.
- DEL – Nate Reed 32-yard field goal, 2:09. Fightin' Blue Hens 58–31. Drive: 4 plays, 4 yards, 0:17.
- DEL – Nate Reed 43-yard field goal, 0:43. Fightin' Blue Hens 61–31. Drive: 3 plays, -2 yards, 1:28.

Statistics	UTEP	DEL
First downs	18	22
Plays–yards	74–370	74–527
Rushes–yards	33–26	37–216
Passing yards	344	311
Passing: Comp–Att–Int	23–41–5	24–37–0
Turnovers	6	1
Time of possession	26:55	33:05

Team	Category	Player	Statistics
UTEP	Passing	Skyler Locklear	22/39, 338 yards, 4 TD, 5 INT
UTEP	Rushing	Ashten Emory	12 carries, 29 yards
UTEP	Receiving	Wondame Davis Jr.	3 receptions, 112 yards, TD
Delaware	Passing	Nick Minicucci	24/37, 311 yards, 3 TD
Delaware	Rushing	Jo Silver	7 carries, 64 yards, TD
Delaware	Receiving	Kyre Duplessis	4 receptions, 104 yards

=== vs. Louisiana (68 Ventures Bowl) ===
2025 68 Ventures Bowl
Louisiana Ragin' Cajuns (6–6) vs Delaware Fightin' Blue Hens (6–6) – Game summary

Quarter	1	2	3	4	Total
Ragin' Cajuns	0	3	3	7	13
Fightin' Blue Hens	7	3	10	0	20

at Hancock Whitney Stadium • Mobile, AL

- Date: December 17, 2025
- Game time: 7:30 PM CST
- Game weather: Overcast • Temperature: 61 °F (16 °C) • Wind: ESE at 3 mph (4.8 km/h)
- Game attendance: 17,234
- Referee: Reid Jackson
- TV announcers (ESPN): Clay Matvick (play-by-play), Max Browne (analyst), and Alyssa Lang (sideline)

Game information

First quarter

- (0:18) DEL – Jo Silver 61-yard run, Nate Reed kick (Drive: 5 plays, 80 yards, 2:28; Delaware 7–0)

Second quarter

- (7:05) LA – Tony Sterner 22-yard field goal (Drive: 16 plays, 70 yards, 8:13; Delaware 7–3)
- (0:28) DEL – Nate Reed 33-yard field goal (Drive: 12 plays, 49 yards, 3:29; Delaware 10–3)

Third quarter

- (12:40) DEL – Sean Wilson 35-yard pass from Nick Minicucci, Nate Reed kick (Drive: 6 plays, 70 yards, 2:15; Delaware 17–3)
- (6:59) DEL – Nate Reed 27-yard field goal (Drive: 10 plays, 62 yards, 4:19; Delaware 20–3)
- (2:31) LA – Tony Sterner 39-yard field goal (Drive: 10 plays, 53 yards, 4:28; Delaware 20–6)

Fourth quarter

- (7:49) LA – Shelton Sampson Jr. 8-yard pass from Lunch Winfield, Tony Sterner kick (Drive: 10 plays, 46 yards, 5:04; Delaware 20–13)

Statistics	LA	DEL
First downs	20	16
Plays–yards	77–335	60–334
Rushes–yards	39–104	30–158
Passing yards	231	176
Passing: Comp–Att–Int	21–38–1	19–30–0
Turnovers	3	0
Time of possession	33:55	26:05

Team	Category	Player	Statistics
Louisiana	Passing	Lunch Winfield	21/36, 231, TD, INT
Louisiana	Rushing	Lunch Winfield	14 carries, 40 yards
Louisiana	Receiving	Caden Jensen	4 receptions, 72 yards
Delaware	Passing	Nick Minicucci	19/30, 176 yards, TD
Delaware	Rushing	Jo Silver	14 carries, 116 yards, TD
Delaware	Receiving	Sean Wilson	8 receptions, 81 yards, TD
