= 2025 Louisiana Ragin' Cajuns football team =

American college football season

2025 Louisiana Ragin' Cajuns football

68 Ventures Bowl vs. Delaware, L 13–20
- Conference: Sun Belt Conference
- West Division
- Record: 6–7 (5–3 Sun Belt)
- Head coach: Michael Desormeaux (4th season)
- Associate head coach: Jorge Munoz (4th season)
- Offensive coordinator: Tim Leger (5th season)
- Offensive scheme: Spread
- Defensive coordinator: Jim Salgado (2nd season)
- Base defense: 4–3
- Home stadium: Our Lady of Lourdes Stadium

2025 Sun Belt Conference football standings
	Conf.			Overall
Team	W		L	W		L
East Division
No. 19 James Madison xy$^	8	–	0	12	–	2
Old Dominion	6	–	2	10	–	3
Coastal Carolina	5	–	3	6	–	7
Georgia Southern	4	–	4	7	–	6
Marshall	3	–	5	5	–	7
Appalachian State	2	–	6	5	–	8
Georgia State	0	–	8	1	–	11
West Division
Troy xy	6	–	2	8	–	6
Southern Miss	5	–	3	7	–	6
Louisiana	5	–	3	6	–	7
Arkansas State	5	–	3	7	–	6
Texas State	3	–	5	7	–	6
South Alabama	3	–	5	4	–	8
Louisiana–Monroe	1	–	7	3	–	9
Championship: James Madison 31, Troy 14
^ – College Football Playoff participant; $ – Conference champion; x – Division champion/co-champions; y – Championship game participant; Rankings from AP Poll

The 2025 Louisiana Ragin' Cajuns football team represented the University of Louisiana at Lafayette in the Sun Belt Conference's West Division during the 2025 NCAA Division I FBS football season. The Ragin' Cajuns were led by Michael Desormeaux in his fourth year as the head coach. The Ragin' Cajuns played their home games at Cajun Field, located in Lafayette, Louisiana.

== Preseason ==
=== Media poll ===
In the Sun Belt preseason coaches' poll, the Ragin' Cajuns were picked to finish first place in the West division.

Defensive lineman Jordan Lawson and defensive back Tyree Skipper were awarded to be in the preseason All-Sun Belt first team defense, respectively. Running back Bill Davis, offensive linemen Jax Harrington and George Jackson and linebacker Cameron Whitfield were named to the second team offense and defense.

== Personnel ==
2025 Louisiana Ragin' Cajuns football team roster
Players
Coaches
Offense

Pos.	#	Name	Class
WR	0	Robert Williams	Sr
QB	2	Lunch Winfield	So
RB	3	Zylan Perry	Jr
QB	4	Walker Howard	Jr
WR	6	Shelton Sampson Jr.	So
RB	7	Elijah Davis	So
WR	8	Rahji Dennis	Fr
WR	9	Trenton Chaney	Fr
WR	10	Russell Babineaux	Fr
QB	11	Daniel Beale	Fr
WR	13	Charles Robertson	Jr
QB	15	Coleman Carter	Fr
QB	16	Sam Altmann	Fr
WR	18	Jaydon Johnson	Jr
WR	19	Dale Martin	Sr
RB	20	JJ Garner	Fr
RB	22	Darrell Smith	Fr
WR	23	Landon Strother	Fr
RB	24	Steven Blanco	Fr
RB	25	Hutch Swilley	Fr
TE	43	Aiden Falgout	Fr
TE	44	Teddy Gawlik	Fr
TE	46	Emiliano Soldevilla	So
OL	50	Cooper Fordham	So
OL	52	Ryder Bentley	Fr
OL	55	Baylynn Williams	Fr
OL	57	Zay Alexander	Fr
OL	59	Andrew Martinez	So
OL	60	Jackson Hammond	Fr
OL	63	Ryan Ebrahim	Jr
OL	64	Bryant Williams	Jr
OL	65	Xzavier Brown	So
OL	67	John Bragg	So
OL	70	Jax Harrington	Sr
OL	71	George Jackson	Sr
OL	72	J'Marion Gooch	So
OL	73	Jayden McAllister	Fr
OL	75	Kaden Moreau	Jr
OL	76	Matthew Broussard	So
OL	77	Jakoby Isom	Fr
OL	79	Mackey Maillho	Sr
TE	80	Khristian Mackintrush	Fr
WR	81	Jaiden Smith	Fr
TE	82	Quandre Coates	Fr
TE	83	Brock Chappell	Jr
WR	84	Evan Stroman	Fr
WR	85	Landon Baptiste	So
TE	86	Trey Miller	GS
WR	87	KeDarius Wade	So
TE	88	Caden Jensen	So

Defense

Pos.	#	Name	Class
DE	0	Jordan Lawson	Sr
S	2	Jalen Clark	Sr
LB	3	Jaden Dugger	Sr
S	4	Tyree Skipper	Sr
LB	6	Terrence Williams	Sr
S	7	Courtline Flowers	Sr
S	8	Kody Jackson	So
OLB	9	Cameron Whitfield	Sr
CB	10	Avery Demery	Fr
DB	11	Brent Gordon Jr.	Fr
CB	13	Curley Reed III	So
S	15	Ja'Corian Norris	Fr
LB	16	Kailep Edwards	Jr
OLB	17	Ashley Williams	So
S	18	Micaiah Bivines	Jr
CB	19	Cam Riley	Fr
CB	20	Trae Tomlinson	Sr
S	21	Maurion Eleam	Jr
CB	22	Kevin Malone	Fr
CB	23	Jeremiah Moses	So
CB	24	Lorenzell Dubose	Jr
DB	25	Jayden Glosten	Fr
S	26	Kerry Wilson	Jr
S	27	Key'Savalyn Barnes	Sr
S	28	Steven Ranel II	Fr
CB	29	Denim Day	Jr
LB	30	Ethan Veal	So
LB	31	Trey Fite	Jr
OLB	33	AJ Spencer	Fr
S	35	Collin Jacob	So
LB	36	Conor McPherson	Fr
LB	37	Micah Johnson	So
LB	38	Na'Tori Brown	Fr
DE	41	Chase Edwards	So
LB	44	Jake St. Andre	Jr
LB	45	Caleb Kibodi	Sr
S	45	Lake Bates	Fr
CB	47	Maurice Brown Jr.	Fr
LB	51	Hayden Darbonne	So
DL	56	Korbin Ashmore	Fr
DL	68	Fitzgerald West Jr.	Jr
OLB	80	Lester Jones	So
DL	90	Kadarius Miller	Sr
DL	91	Priest Ashe	Fr
DL	93	Jaelen Crider	GS
DL	94	De'Antonio Lesueur	Fr
DL	95	Maxie Baudoin IV	Sr
DL	96	Chase Howard	Fr
DE	97	Lance Williams	So
DL	98	Jeremiah Holts	Fr
DL	99	Ashton Wright	Fr

Special teams

Pos.	#	Name	Class
K	29	Brek Schultz	Fr
LS	39	Carter Milliron	Sr
K	40	Logan Klotz	Sr
LS	48	Hunter Sims	Sr
P	92	Nathan Torney	Sr
K	95	Tony Sterner	Jr

Head coach

- Michael Desormeaux (Louisiana)

Coordinators/assistant coaches

- Tim Leger (McNeese State)
  Offensive coordinator/recruiting coordinator/WR
- Jim Salgado (Hofstra)
  Defensive coordinator/S
- Jorge Munoz (Bethany)
  Associate head coach/TE
- George Barlow (Marshall)
  Cornerbacks
- Matt Bergeron (Lamar)
  Running backs
- PJ Burkhalter (Nicholls State)
  Assistant OL
- Steve Farmer (Illinois State)
  Offensive linemen/run game coordinator
- Mike Giuliani (SUNY Cortland)
  Special teams coordinator/OLB
- Scott Stoker (Northwestern State)
  Inside linebackers
- Dennis Thomas (South Carolina)
  Defensive linemen

Legend

- (C) Team captain
- (S) Suspended
- (I) Ineligible
- Injured
- Redshirt

Roster
Last update: 8 August 2025

== Schedule ==
Date	Time	Opponent	Site	TV	Result	Attendance
August 30	7:00 p.m.	Rice*	Our Lady of Lourdes Stadium; Lafayette, LA	ESPN+	L 12–14	22,148
September 6	7:00 p.m.	McNeese*	Our Lady of Lourdes Stadium; Lafayette, LA (Cajun Crown)	ESPN+	W 34–10	26,071
September 13	12:00 p.m.	at No. 25 Missouri*	Faurot Field; Columbia, MO	SECN+/ESPN+	L 10–52	57,321
September 20	2:30 p.m.	at Eastern Michigan*	Rynearson Stadium; Ypsilanti, MI	ESPN+	L 31–34	18,371
September 27	7:00 p.m.	Marshall	Our Lady of Lourdes Stadium; Lafayette, LA	ESPN+	W 54–51 ^{2OT}	20,125
October 11	11:00 a.m.	at James Madison	Bridgeforth Stadium; Harrisonburg, VA	ESPN2	L 14–24	25,128
October 18	4:00 p.m.	Southern Miss^{†}	Our Lady of Lourdes Stadium; Lafayette, LA	ESPN+	L 10–22	21,047
October 25	6:00 p.m.	at Troy	Veterans Memorial Stadium; Troy, AL	ESPN+	L 23–35	16,341
November 1	2:30 p.m.	at South Alabama	Hancock Whitney Stadium; Mobile, AL	ESPN+	W 31–22	18,462
November 8	4:00 p.m.	Texas State	Our Lady of Lourdes Stadium; Lafayette, LA	ESPN+	W 42–39	14,231
November 20	6:30 p.m.	at Arkansas State	Centennial Bank Stadium; Jonesboro, AR	ESPN	W 34–30	13,571
November 29	2:00 p.m.	Louisiana–Monroe	Our Lady of Lourdes Stadium; Lafayette, LA (Battle on the Bayou)	ESPN+	W 30–27 ^{OT}	16,270
December 17	7:30 p.m.	vs. Delaware*	Hancock Whitney Stadium; Mobile, AL (68 Ventures Bowl)	ESPN	L 13–20	17,234
*Non-conference game; ^{†}Homecoming; Rankings from AP Poll and CFP Rankings released prior to game; All times are in Central time

== Game summaries ==
=== Rice ===
Rice Owls (0–0) at Louisiana Ragin' Cajuns (0–0) – Game summary

Quarter	1	2	3	4	Total
Owls	0	14	0	0	14
Ragin' Cajuns	3	3	6	0	12

at Our Lady of Lourdes Stadium • Lafayette, LA

- Date: August 30
- Game time: 7:00 PM CDT
- Game weather: Cloudy • Temperature: 81 °F (27 °C) • Wind: NE at 5 miles per hour (8.0 km/h)
- Game attendance: 22,148
- Referee: Steven Robinson
- TV announcers (ESPN+): Dan McDonald (play-by-play), Eric Mouton (analyst), and Ben Schafer (sideline)

Game information

First quarter

- (6:04) LA – Tony Sterner 47-yard field goal (Drive: 10 plays, 26 yards, 4:21; Louisiana 3–0)

Second quarter

- (14:34) RICE – Quinton Jackson 1-yard run, Enock Gota kick (Drive: 13 plays, 72 yards, 6:24; Rice 7–3)
- (3:38) RICE – Aaron Turner 17-yard run, Enock Gota kick (Drive: 8 plays, 66 yards, 3:59; Rice 14–3)
- (0:26) LA – Tony Sterner 51-yard field goal (Drive: 10 plays, 41 yards, 3:12; Rice 14–6)

Third quarter

- (1:45) LA – Walker Howard 25-yard run, two-point conversion pass failed (Drive: 11 plays, 98 yards, 5:09; Rice 14–12)

Fourth quarter

No scoring plays.

Statistics	RICE	LA
First downs	18	16
Plays–yards	62–254	59–239
Rushes–yards	53–209	31–151
Passing yards	45	88
Passing: comp–att–int	7–9–0	10–28–1
Turnovers	0	2
Time of possession	36:24	23:36

Team	Category	Player	Statistics
Rice	Passing	Chase Jenkins	7/9, 45 yards
Rice	Rushing	Quinton Jackson	22 carries, 119 yards, TD
Rice	Receiving	Drayden Dickman	3 receptions, 44 yards
Louisiana	Passing	Walker Howard	10/22, 88 yards, INT
Louisiana	Rushing	Bill Davis	11 carries, 58 yards
Louisiana	Receiving	Shelton Sampson Jr.	4 receptions, 59 yards

=== McNeese (FCS, Cajun Crown) ===
McNeese Cowboys (FCS) (1–0) at Louisiana Ragin' Cajuns (0–1) – Game summary

Quarter	1	2	3	4	Total
Cowboys (FCS)	7	0	3	0	10
Ragin' Cajuns	7	10	0	17	34

at Our Lady of Lourdes Stadium • Lafayette, LA

- Date: September 6, 2025
- Game time: 7:00 PM CDT
- Game weather: Sunny • Temperature: 89 °F (32 °C) • Wind: SW 5 mph
- Game attendance: 26,071
- Referee: Marshall Lewis
- TV announcers (ESPN+): Dan McDonald (play-by-play), Eric Mouton (analyst), and Ben Schafer (sideline)

Game information

First quarter

- (12:58) LA – Bill Davis 6-yard run, Tony Sterner kick (Drive: 5 plays, 46 yards, 1:54; Louisiana 7–0)
- (10:08) MCN – Devin Lippold 2-yard run, Fabrizio Pinton kick (Drive: 5 plays, 80 yards, 2:42; Tied 7–7)

Second quarter

- (1:06) LA – Bill Davis 36-yard run, Tony Sterner kick (Drive: 6 plays, 91 yards, 0:47; Louisiana 14–7)
- (0:00) LA – Tony Sterner 38-yard field goal (Drive: 4 plays, 35 yards, 0:39; Louisiana 17–7)

Third quarter

- (11:50) MCN – Fabrizio Pinton 45-yard field goal (Drive: 8 plays, 47 yards, 3:10; Louisiana 17–10)

Fourth quarter

- (10:41) LA – Tony Sterner 37-yard field goal (Drive: 12 plays, 65 yards, 6:19; Louisiana 20–10)
- (3:48) LA – Landon Baptiste 10-yard pass from Daniel Beale, Tony Sterner kick (Drive: 9 plays, 40 yards, 5:46; Louisiana 27–10)
- (1:39) LA – Steven Blanco 34-yard run, Tony Sterner kick (Drive: 1 play, 34 yards, 0:03; Louisiana 34–10)

Statistics	MCN	UL
First downs	14	25
Plays–yards	56–238	67–401
Rushes–yards	26–47	45–315
Passing yards	191	86
Passing: Comp–Att–Int	19–30–1	14–22–0
Turnovers	2	0
Time of possession	25:43	34:17

Team	Category	Player	Statistics
McNeese	Passing	Jake Strong	19/30, 191 yards, INT
McNeese	Rushing	Bryce Strong	7 carries, 17 yards
McNeese	Receiving	Joshua Jackson	4 receptions, 83 yards
Louisiana	Passing	Daniel Beale	14/22, 86 yards, TD
Louisiana	Rushing	Bill Davis	19 carries, 132 yards, 2 TD
Louisiana	Receiving	KeDarius Wade	1 reception, 19 yards

=== at No. 25 Missouri ===
Louisiana Ragin' Cajuns (1–1) at No. 25 Missouri Tigers (2–0) – Game summary

Quarter	1	2	3	4	Total
Ragin' Cajuns	0	10	0	0	10
No. 25 Tigers	14	24	7	7	52

at Faurot Field • Columbia, MO

- Date: September 13, 2025
- Game time: 12:00 PM CDT
- Game weather: Sunny • Temperature: 91 °F (33 °C) • Wind: WSW 10 mph
- Game attendance: 57,32
- Referee: David Smith
- TV announcers (ESPN+/SECN+): Jay Alter (play-by-play), Rocky Boiman (analyst), and Tori Petry (sideline)

Game information

First quarter

- (8:26) MIZ – Ahmad Hardy 7-yard run (Robert Meyer kick). (Drive: 10 plays, 73 yards, 5:17; Missouri 7–0)
- (2:38) MIZ – Marquis Johnson 11-yard pass from Beau Pribula (Robert Meyer kick). (Drive: 8 plays, 60 yards, 4:30; Missouri 14–0)

Second quarter

- (14:18) MIZ – Beau Pribula 14-yard run (Robert Meyer kick). (Drive: 4 plays, 59 yards, 1:21; Missouri 21–0)
- (10:31) MIZ – Jamal Roberts 39-yard pass from Beau Pribula (Robert Meyer kick). (Drive: 5 plays, 74 yards, 2:04; Missouri 28–0)
- (6:22) LA – Tony Sterner 34-yard field goal. (Drive: 4 plays, 5 yards, 1:59; Missouri 28–3)
- (5:41) MIZ – Ahmad Hardy 71-yard run (Robert Meyer kick). (Drive: 2 plays, 75 yards, 0:34; Missouri 35–3)
- (3:27) LA – Zylan Perry 84-yard run (Tony Sterner kick). (Drive: 1 play, 84 yards, 0:14; Missouri 35–10)
- (0:00) MIZ – Robert Meyer 22-yard field goal. (Drive: 14 plays, 71 yards, 3:27; Missouri 38–10)

Third quarter

- (10:02) MIZ – Ahmad Hardy 7-yard run (Robert Meyer kick). (Drive: 10 plays, 75 yards, 4:58; Missouri 45–10)

Fourth quarter

- (7:02) MIZ – Marquise Davis 2-yard run (Robert Meyer kick). (Drive: 17 plays, 73 yards, 10:43; Missouri 52–10)

Statistics	LA	MIZ
First downs	4	32
Plays–yards	36–121	86–606
Rushes–yards	22–117	62–427
Passing yards	4	179
Passing: comp–att–int	2–14–0	17–24–1
Turnovers	0	1
Time of possession	17:09	42:51

Team	Category	Player	Statistics
Louisiana	Passing	Daniel Beale	1/8, 5 yards
Louisiana	Rushing	Zylan Perry	5 carries, 86 yards, TD
Louisiana	Receiving	Caden Jensen	1 reception, 5 yards
Missouri	Passing	Beau Pribula	15/22, 174 yards, 2 TD, INT
Missouri	Rushing	Ahmad Hardy	22 carries, 250 yards, 3 TD
Missouri	Receiving	Kevin Coleman Jr.	8 receptions, 84 yards

=== at Eastern Michigan ===
Louisiana Ragin' Cajuns (1–2) at Eastern Michigan Eagles (0–3) – Game summary

Quarter	1	2	3	4	Total
Ragin' Cajuns	7	10	7	7	31
Eagles	7	14	0	13	34

at Rynearson Stadium • Ypsilanti, MI

- Date: September 20, 2025
- Game time: 2:30 p.m. CDT
- Game weather: Sunny • Temperature: 79 °F (26 °C) • Wind: E at 7 miles per hour (11 km/h)
- Game attendance: 18,371
- Referee: Tim Barker
- TV announcers (ESPN+): Jason Ross Jr. (play-by-play) and Tyoka Jackson (analyst)

Game information

First quarter

- (11:32) LA – Zylan Perry 23-yard run, Tony Sterner kick (Drive: 7 plays, 75 yards, 3:28; Louisiana 7–0)
- (5:07) EMU – Noah Kim 3-yard run, Rudy Kessinger kick (Drive: 8 plays, 54 yards, 3:31; Tied 7–7)

Second quarter

- (14:56) LA – Tony Sterner 38-yard field goal (Drive: 12 plays, 54 yards, 5:11; Louisiana 10–7)
- (12:31) EMU – Tavierre Dunlap 2-yard run, Rudy Kessinger kick (Drive: 5 plays, 60 yards, 2:17; Eastern Michigan 14–10)
- (9:32) LA – Bill Davis 45-yard run, Tony Sterner kick (Drive: 7 plays, 75 yards, 2:53; Louisiana 17–14)
- (1:13) EMU – Joshua Long 15-yard pass from Noah Kim, Rudy Kessinger kick (Drive: 7 plays, 52 yards, 2:11; Eastern Michigan 21–17)

Third quarter

- (5:20) LA – Courtline Flowers 35-yard interception return, Tony Sterner kick (Louisiana 24–21)

Fourth quarter

- (14:55) EMU – Tavierre Dunlap 6-yard run, Rudy Kessinger kick (Drive: 11 plays, 75 yards, 5:25; Eastern Michigan 28–24)
- (10:16) EMU – Rudy Kessinger 49-yard field goal (Drive: 4 plays, 6 yards, 2:06; Eastern Michigan 31–24)
- (0:47) LA – Zylan Perry 10-yard run, Tony Sterner kick (Drive: 7 plays, 65 yards, 1:21; Tied 31–31)
- (0:03) EMU – Rudy Kessinger 42-yard field goal (Drive: 7 plays, 41 yards, 0:41; Eastern Michigan 34–31)

Statistics	LA	EMU
First downs	22	20
Plays–yards	67–451	67–409
Rushes–yards	32–214	36–183
Passing yards	237	226
Passing: Comp–Att–Int	21–35–2	21–31–1
Turnovers	2	1
Time of possession	29:59	30:01

Team	Category	Player	Statistics
Louisiana	Passing	Daniel Beale	20/33, 232 yards, 2 INT
Louisiana	Rushing	Zylan Perry	15 carries, 110 yards, 2 TD
Louisiana	Receiving	Shelton Sampson Jr.	3 receptions, 87 yards
Eastern Michigan	Passing	Noah Kim	21/31, 226 yards, TD, INT
Eastern Michigan	Rushing	Dontae McMillan	19 carries, 126 yards
Eastern Michigan	Receiving	Nick Devereaux	4 receptions, 76 yards

=== Marshall ===
Marshall Thundering Herd (2–2) at Louisiana Ragin' Cajuns (1–3) – Game summary

Quarter	1	2	3	4	OT	2OT	Total
Thundering Herd	3	14	17	7	7	3	51
Ragin' Cajuns	3	14	3	21	7	6	54

at Our Lady of Lourdes Stadium • Lafayette, LA

- Date: September 27, 2025
- Game time: 7:00 p.m. CDT
- Game weather: Sunny
- Game attendance: 20,125
- Referee: Ted Pitts
- TV announcers (ESPN+): Dan McDonald (play-by-play), Eric Mouton (analyst) and Ben Schafer (sideline)

Game information

First quarter

- (9:52) MRSH – Lorcan Quinn 53-yard field goal (Drive: 5 plays, 16 yards, 4:38; Marshall 3–0)
- (6:46) LA – Tony Sterner 26-yard field goal (Drive: 9 plays, 29 yards, 6:52; Tied 3–3)

Second quarter

- (10:51) MRSH – Michael Allen 9-yard run, Lorcan Quinn kick (Drive: 11 plays, 56 yards, 5:09; Marshall 10–3)
- (6:41) LA – Zylan Perry 19-yard run, Tony Sterner kick (Drive: 8 plays, 75 yards, 4:10; Tied 10–10)
- (1:43) LA – Lunch Winfield 6-yard run, Tony Sterner kick (Drive: 9 plays, 64 yards, 3:43; Louisiana 17–10)
- (0:23) MRSH – Demarcus Lacey 32-yard pass from Carlos Del Rio-Wilson, Lorcan Quinn kick (Drive: 8 plays, 75 yards, 1:20; Tied 17–17)

Third quarter

- (14:20) MRSH – Michael Allen 68-yard run, Lorcan Quinn kick (Drive: 2 plays, 70 yards, 0:35; Marshall 24–17)
- (11:11) MRSH – Paul Hutson III 46-yard interception return, Lorcan Quinn kick (Marshall 31–17)
- (6:55) MRSH – Lorcan Quinn 30-yard field goal (Drive: 8 plays, 28 yards, 3:35; Marshall 34–17)
- (1:32) LA – Tony Sterner 35-yard field goal (Drive: 11 plays, 57 yards, 5:23; Marshall 34–20)

Fourth quarter

- (10:16) LA – Lunch Winfield 2-yard run, Tony Sterner kick (Drive: 6 plays, 65 yards, 3:03; Marshall 34–27)
- (4:27) LA – Charles Robertson 45-yard pass from Lunch Winfield, Tony Sterner kick (Drive: 6 plays, 81 yards, 2:34; Tied 34–34)
- (1:01) MRSH – Demarcus Lacey 27-yard pass from Carlos Del Rio-Wilson, Lorcan Quinn kick (Drive: 7 plays, 71 yards, 3:17; Marshall 41–34)
- (0:16) LA – Dale Martin 24-yard pass from Lunch Winfield, Tony Sterner kick (Drive: 7 plays, 75 yards, 0:45; Tied 41–41)

First overtime

- LA – Zylan Perry 25-yard run, Tony Sterner kick (Drive: 1 play, 25 yards; Louisiana 48–41)
- MRSH – Adrian Norton 3-yard pass from Carlos Del Rio-Wilson, Lorcan Quinn kick (Drive: 6 plays, 25 yards; Tied 48–48)

Second overtime

- MRSH – Lorcan Quinn 46-yard field goal (Drive: 4 plays, –3 yards; Marshall 51–48)
- LA – Lunch Winfield 10-yard run (Drive: 5 play, 25 yards; Louisiana 54–51)

Statistics	MRSH	LA
First downs	27	29
Plays–yards	79–503	74–461
Rushes–yards	48–245	46–264
Passing yards	258	197
Passing: Comp–Att–Int	24–31–0	14–28–2
Turnovers	1	2
Time of possession	30:28	29:32

Team	Category	Player	Statistics
Marshall	Passing	Carlos Del Rio-Wilson	24/31, 258 yards, 3 TD
Marshall	Rushing	Michael Allen	19 carries, 138 yards, 2 TD
Marshall	Receiving	Demarcus Lacey	10 receptions, 146 yards, 2 TD
Louisiana	Passing	Lunch Winfield	7/13, 125 yards, 2 TD
Louisiana	Rushing	Lunch Winfield	13 carries, 129 yards, 3 TD
Louisiana	Receiving	Charles Robertson	2 reception, 61 yards, TD

=== at James Madison ===
Louisiana Ragin' Cajuns (2–3) at James Madison Dukes (4–2) – Game summary

Quarter	1	2	3	4	Total
Ragin' Cajuns	0	14	0	0	14
Dukes	0	7	7	10	24

at Bridgeforth Stadium • Harrisonburg, VA

- Date: October 11, 2025
- Game time: 11:00 a.m. CDT
- Game weather: Sunny
- Referee: Trennis Livingston
- TV announcers (ESPN2): Lowell Galindo (play-by-play), Aaron Murray (analyst) and Lauren Sisler (sideline)

Game information

First quarter

- No scoring plays.

Second quarter

- (8:33) LA – Brock Chappell 5-yard pass from Lunch Winfield, Tony Sterner kick (Drive: 6 plays, 80 yards, 4:02; Louisiana 7–0)
- (4:47) JMU – Landon Ellis 4-yard pass from Alonza Barnett III, Morgan Suarez kick (Drive: 5 plays, 60 yards, 2:01; Tied 7–7)
- (3:16) LA – Dale Martin 69-yard pass from Lunch Winfield, Tony Sterner kick (Drive: 3 plays, 75 yards, 1:31; Louisiana 14–7)

Third quarter

- (14:46) JMU – Landon Ellis 62-yard pass from Alonza Barnett III, Morgan Suarez kick (Drive: 1 play, 62 yards, 0:09; Tied 14–14)

Fourth quarter

- (12:33) JMU – Landon Ellis 4-yard pass from Alonza Barnett III, Morgan Suarez kick (Drive: 6 plays, 25 yards, 2:31; James Madison 21–14)
- (3:05) JMU – Morgan Suarez 24-yard field goal (Drive: 7 plays, 51 yards, 3:03; James Madison 24–14)

Statistics	LA	JMU
First downs	11	21
Plays–yards	57–288	81–477
Rushes–yards	28–45	41–187
Passing yards	243	290
Passing: Comp–Att–Int	14–29–1	26–40–1
Turnovers	1	3
Time of possession	23:09	36:51

Team	Category	Player	Statistics
Louisiana	Passing	Lunch Winfield	14/28, 243 yards, 2 TD, INT
Louisiana	Rushing	Lunch Winfield	15 carries, 23 yards
Louisiana	Receiving	Robert Williams	5 receptions, 134 yards
James Madison	Passing	Alonza Barnett III	26/40, 290 yards, 3 TD, INT
James Madison	Rushing	Wayne Knight	20 carries, 111 yards
James Madison	Receiving	Landon Ellis	6 receptions, 120 yards, 3 TD

=== Southern Miss ===
Southern Miss Golden Eagles (4–2) at Louisiana Ragin' Cajuns (2–4) – Game summary

Quarter	1	2	3	4	Total
Golden Eagles	0	13	7	2	22
Ragin' Cajuns	7	0	3	0	10

at Our Lady of Lourdes Stadium • Lafayette, LA

- Date: October 18, 2025
- Game time: 4:00 p.m. CDT
- Game weather: Cloudy • Temperature: 79 °F (26 °C) • Wind: SE 10 mph
- Game attendance: 21,047
- Referee: Steven Robinson
- TV announcers (ESPN+): Dan McDonald (play-by-play), Eric Mouton (analyst) and Ben Schafer (sideline)

Game information

First quarter

- (3:21) LA – Lunch Winfield 3-yard run, Tony Sterner kick (Drive: 16 plays, 85 yards, 8:01; Louisiana 7–0)

Second quarter

- (7:42) USM – Matt Jones 1-yard run, Creighton Wilbanks kick (Drive: 3 plays, 37 yards, 0:47; Tied 7–7)
- (1:29) USM – Creighton Wilbanks 32-yard field goal (Drive: 10 plays, 66 yards, 2:55; Southern Miss 10–7)
- (0:00) USM – Creighton Wilbanks 52-yard field goal (Drive: 1 play, 0 yards, 0:03; Southern Miss 13–7)

Third quarter

- (9:35) LA – Tony Sterner 24-yard field goal (Drive: 10 plays, 77 yards, 5:21; Southern Miss 13–10)
- (3:40) USM – Micah Davis 98-yard pass from Braylon Braxton, Creighton Wilbanks kick (Drive: 3 plays, 94 yards, 0:58; Southern Miss 20–10)

Fourth quarter

- (3:43) USM – Team Safety (Drive: 4 plays, -7 yards, 1:06; Southern Miss 22–10)

Statistics	USM	LA
First downs	14	19
Plays–yards	59–371	75–356
Rushes–yards	41–133	48–221
Passing yards	238	135
Passing: Comp–Att–Int	13–18–1	14–27–2
Turnovers	2	3
Time of possession	24:29	35:31

Team	Category	Player	Statistics
Southern Miss	Passing	Braylon Braxton	13/18, 238 yards, TD, INT
Southern Miss	Rushing	Jeffery Pittman	21 carries, 73 yards
Southern Miss	Receiving	Micah Davis	3 receptions, 134 yards, TD
Louisiana	Passing	Lunch Winfield	12/21, 112 yards, INT
Louisiana	Rushing	Lunch Winfield	19 carries, 98 yards, TD
Louisiana	Receiving	Caden Jensen	5 receptions, 45 yards

=== at Troy ===
Louisiana Ragin' Cajuns (2–5) at Troy Trojans (5–2) – Game summary

Quarter	1	2	3	4	Total
Ragin' Cajuns	7	10	3	3	23
Trojans	7	14	7	7	35

at Veterans Memorial Stadium • Troy, AL

- Date: October 25, 2025
- Game time: 6:00 PM CDT
- Game weather: Sunny • Temperature: 72 °F (22 °C) • Wind: E 6 mph
- Game attendance: 23,719
- Referee: Ted Pitts
- TV announcers (ESPN+): Will Kollmeyer (play-by-play) and Ben Stanfield (analyst)

Game information

First quarter

- (9:01) TROY – Tucker Kilcrease 8-yard run, Scott Taylor Renfroe kick (Drive: 11 plays, 67 yards, 5:53; Troy 7–0)
- (8:27) LA – Shelton Sampson Jr. 36-yard pass from Lunch Winfield, Tony Sterner kick (Drive: 2 plays, 75 yards, 0:36; Tied 7–7)

Second quarter

- (14:14) LA – Zylan Perry 1-yard run, Tony Sterner kick (Drive: 2 plays, 1 yard, 0:22; Louisiana 14–7)
- (9:42) TROY – Jaquez White 30-yard interception return, Scott Taylor Renfroe kick (Drive: 1 play, 0 yards, 0:12; Tied 14–14)
- (8:03) TROY – Tucker Kilcrease 4-yard run, Scott Taylor Renfroe kick (Drive: 2 plays, 26 yards, 0:42; Troy 21–14)
- (1:51) LA – Tony Sterner 37-yard field goal (Drive: 12 plays, 55 yards, 6:12; Troy 21–17)

Third quarter

- (7:16) TROY – Jordan Lovett 1-yard run, Scott Taylor Renfroe kick (Drive: 11 plays, 69 yards, 5:29; Troy 28–17)
- (1:29) LA – Tony Sterner 31-yard field goal (Drive: 10 plays, 62 yards, 5:47; Troy 28–20)

Fourth quarter

- (7:08) LA – Tony Sterner 32-yard field goal (Drive: 16 plays, 81 yards, 7:42; Troy 28–23)
- (2:55) TROY – Jordan Lovett 19-yard rush, Scott Taylor Renfroe kick (Drive: 7 plays, 75 yards, 4:13; Troy 35–23)

Statistics	LA	TROY
First downs	18	21
Plays–yards	65–371	63–345
Rushes–yards	42–184	39–165
Passing yards	187	180
Passing: Comp–Att–Int	12–23–3	16–24–1
Turnovers	3	1
Time of possession	29:28	30:32

Team	Category	Player	Statistics
Louisiana	Passing	Lunch Winfield	12/22, 187 yards, TD, 2 INT
Louisiana	Rushing	Lunch Winfield	23 carries, 139 yards
Louisiana	Receiving	Shelton Sampson Jr.	5 receptions, 74 yards, TD
Troy	Passing	Tucker Kilcrease	16/24, 180 yards, INT
Troy	Rushing	Jordan Lovett	21 carries, 113 yards, 2 TD
Troy	Receiving	Ethan Conner	3 receptions, 68 yards

=== at South Alabama ===
Louisiana Ragin' Cajuns (2–6) at South Alabama Jaguars (2–6) – Game summary

Quarter	1	2	3	4	Total
Ragin' Cajuns	10	14	7	0	31
Jaguars	0	7	7	8	22

at Hancock Whitney Stadium • Mobile, AL

- Date: November 1, 2025
- Game time: 2:30 p.m. CDT
- Game weather: Sunny • Temperature: 69 °F (21 °C) • Wind: W 5 mph
- Game attendance: 18,462
- Referee: Jeremy Parker
- TV announcers (ESPN+): Pat Greenwood (play-by-play) and Brian Genard (analyst)

Game information

First quarter

- (8:05) LA – Shelton Sampson Jr. 25-yard pass from Lunch Winfield, Tony Sterner kick (Drive: 9 plays, 75 yards, 4:46; Louisiana 7–0)
- (1:24) LA – Tony Sterner 32-yard field goal (Drive: 9 plays, 60 yards, 5:04; Louisiana 10–0)

Second quarter

- (9:38) USA – Keenan Phillips 15-yard run, Davis Little kick (Drive: 16 plays, 84 yards, 6:46; Louisiana 10–7)
- (2:09) LA – Zylan Perry 18-yard run, Tony Sterner kick (Drive: 12 plays, 75 yards, 7:29; Louisiana 17–7)
- (0:11) LA – Shelton Sampson Jr. 17-yard pass from Lunch Winfield, Tony Sterner kick (Drive: 6 plays, 64 yards, 1:25; Louisiana 24–7)

Third quarter

- (11:58) LA – Lunch Winfield 1-yard run, Tony Sterner kick (Drive: 7 plays, 75 yards, 3:02; Louisiana 31–7)
- (6:54) USA – Bishop Davenport 5-yard run, Davis Little kick (Drive: 12 plays, 75 yards, 5:04; Louisiana 31–14)

Fourth quarter

- (11:59) USA – Jeremy Scott 64-yard pass from Bishop Davenport, Davis Little kick (Drive: 1 play, 64 yards, 0:10; Louisiana 31–22)

Statistics	LA	USA
First downs	22	21
Plays–yards	63–393	69–368
Rushes–yards	46–161	36–165
Passing yards	232	203
Passing: Comp–Att–Int	14–17–0	20–33–1
Turnovers	0	1
Time of possession	32:54	27:06

Team	Category	Player	Statistics
Louisiana	Passing	Lunch Winfield	14/15, 232 yards, 2 TD
Louisiana	Rushing	Zylan Perry	15 carries, 56 yards, TD
Louisiana	Receiving	Shelton Sampson Jr.	6 receptions, 138 yards, 2 TD
South Alabama	Passing	Bishop Davenport	20/33, 203 yards, TD, INT
South Alabama	Rushing	Keenan Phillips	13 carries, 75 yards, TD
South Alabama	Receiving	Jeremy Scott	6 receptions, 102 yards, TD

=== Texas State ===
Texas State Bobcats (3–5) at Louisiana Ragin' Cajuns (3–6) – Game summary

Quarter	1	2	3	4	Total
Bobcats	10	7	3	19	39
Ragin' Cajuns	7	28	0	7	42

at Our Lady of Lourdes Stadium • Lafayette, LA

- Date: November 8, 2025
- Game time: 4:00 p.m. CST
- Game weather: Sunny • Temperature: 83 °F (28 °C) • Wind: SW 9 mph
- Game attendance: 14,231
- Referee: Brandon Kirkland
- TV announcers (ESPN+): Dan McDonald (play-by-play), Eric Mouton (analyst) and Ben Schafer (sideline)

Game information

First quarter

- (8:06) LA – Shelton Simpson Jr. 10-yard pass from Lunch Winfield, Tony Sterner kick (Drive: 10 plays, 80 yards, 4:53; Louisiana 7–0)
- (4:45) TXST – Tyler Robles 25-yard field goal (Drive: 7 plays, 61 yards, 3:21; Louisiana 7–3)
- (0:27) TXST – Lincoln Pare 54-yard run, Tyler Robles kick (Drive: 3 plays, 69 yards, 1:12; Texas State 10–7)

Second quarter

- (11:24) LA – Caden Jensen 27-yard pass from Lunch Winfield, Tony Sterner kick (Drive: 10 plays, 94 yards, 3:59; Louisiana 14–10)
- (8:29) LA – Bill Davis 12-yard run, Tony Sterner kick (Drive: 4 plays, 25 yards, 1:46; Louisiana 21–10)
- (5:36) LA – Shelton Sampson Jr. 12-yard pass from Lunch Winfield, Tony Sterner kick (Drive: 3 plays, 17 yards, 1:22; Louisiana 28–10)
- (4:26) TXST – Titus Lyons 24-yard pass from Brad Jackson, Tyler Robles kick (Drive: 5 plays, 77 yards, 1:04; Louisiana 28–17)
- (0:21) LA – Lunch Winfield 1-yard run, Tony Sterner kick (Drive: 10 plays, 64 yards, 3:55; Louisiana 35–17)

Third quarter

- (2:57) TXST – Tyler Robles 24-yard field goal (Drive: 12 plays, 67 yards, 4:20; Louisiana 35–20)

Fourth quarter

- (13:02) LA – Lunch Winfield 3-yard run, Tony Sterner kick (Drive: 9 plays, 51 yards, 4:53; Louisiana 42–20)
- (12:05) TXST – Beau Sparks 49-yard run, two-point conversion pass failed (Drive: 4 plays, 70 yards, 0:49; Louisiana 42–26)
- (8:19) TXST – Beau Sparks 38-yard pass from Brad Jackson, two-point conversion run failed (Drive: 1 play, 38 yards, 0:09; Louisiana 42–32)
- (3:12) TXST – Chris Dawn Jr. 21-yard pass from Brad Jackson, Tyler Robles kick (Drive: 8 plays, 65 yards, 3:16; Louisiana 42–39)

Statistics	TXST	LA
First downs	22	27
Plays–yards	57–528	79–384
Rushes–yards	24–168	52–192
Passing yards	360	192
Passing: Comp–Att–Int	26–33–1	17–27–2
Turnovers	2	2
Time of possession	22:02	37:58

Team	Category	Player	Statistics
Texas State	Passing	Brad Jackson	26/33, 360 yards, 3 TD, INT
Texas State	Rushing	Lincoln Pare	10 carries, 89 yards, TD
Texas State	Receiving	Beau Sparks	10 receptions, 186 yards, TD
Louisiana	Passing	Lunch Winfield	17/27, 192 yards, 3 TD, 2 INT
Louisiana	Rushing	Bill Davis	18 carries, 87 yards, TD
Louisiana	Receiving	Shelton Sampson Jr.	5 receptions, 80 yards, 2 TD

=== at Arkansas State ===
Louisiana Ragin' Cajuns (4–6) at Arkansas State Red Wolves (5–5) – Game summary

Quarter	1	2	3	4	Total
Ragin' Cajuns	7	17	7	3	34
Red Wolves	10	17	0	3	30

at Centennial Bank Stadium • Jonesboro, AR

- Date: November 20, 2025
- Game time: 6:30 PM CST
- Game weather: Patchy clouds • Temperature: 59 °F (15 °C) • Wind: SE at 4 mph (6.4 km/h)
- Game attendance: 13,571
- Referee: Trennis Livingston
- TV announcers (ESPN): Matt Barrie (play-by-play), Tom Luginbill (analyst) and Harry Lyles Jr. (sideline)

Game information

First quarter

- (9:11) ARST – Clune Van Andel 21-yard field goal (Drive: 5 plays, 33 yards, 1:29; Arkansas State 3–0)
- (7:50) ARST – Cody Sigler 27-yard fumble return, Clune Van Andel kick (Drive: 3 plays, 17 yards, 1:15; Arkansas State 10–0)
- (3:40) LA – Zylan Perry 1-yard run, Tony Sterner kick (Drive: 4 plays, 18 yards, 1:52; Arkansas State 10–7)

Second quarter

- (14:44) LA – Lunch Winfield 1-yard run, Tony Sterner kick (Drive: 9 plays, 35 yards, 3:42; Louisiana 14–10)
- (10:23) ARST – Clune Van Andel 41-yard field goal (Drive: 11 plays, 60 yards, 4:16; Louisiana 14–13)
- (6:57) LA – Tony Sterner 41-yard field goal (Drive: 8 plays, 41 yards, 3:26; Louisiana 17–13)
- (6:45) ARST – Chauncy Cobb 93-yard kickoff returned, Clune Van Andel kick (Drive: 0 plays, 0 yards, 0:00; Arkansas State 20–17)
- (3:38) LA – Lunch Winfield 1-yard run, Tony Sterner kick (Drive: 6 plays, 33 yards, 2:54; Louisiana 24–20)
- (0:53) ARST – Devin Spencer 1-yard run, Clune Van Andel kick (Drive: 11 plays, 75 yards, 2:40; Arkansas State 27–24)

Third quarter

- (6:29) LA – Bill Davis 36-yard run, Tony Sterner kick (Drive: 10 plays, 85 yards, 4:17; Louisiana 31–27)

Fourth quarter

- (13:35) LA – Tony Sterner 50-yard field goal (Drive: 10 plays, 42 yards, 4:55; Louisiana 34–27)
- (6:40) ARST – Clune Van Andel 24-yard field goal (Drive: 15 plays, 69 yards, 6:55; Louisiana 34–30)

Statistics	LA	ARST
First downs	16	24
Plays–yards	71–349	78–394
Rushes–yards	46–202	35–138
Passing yards	147	256
Passing: Comp–Att–Int	18–25–0	25–43–0
Turnovers	1	2
Time of possession	33:59	26:01

Team	Category	Player	Statistics
Louisiana	Passing	Lunch Winfield	18/25, 147 yards
Louisiana	Rushing	Lunch Winfield	20 carries, 89 yards, 2 TD
Louisiana	Receiving	Shelton Sampson Jr.	3 receptions, 35 yards
Arkansas State	Passing	Jaylen Raynor	25/43, 256 yards
Arkansas State	Rushing	Devin Spencer	16 carries, 71 yards, TD
Arkansas State	Receiving	Corey Rucker	8 receptions, 120 yards

=== Louisiana–Monroe (Battle on the Bayou) ===
Louisiana–Monroe Warhawks (3–8) at Louisiana Ragin' Cajuns (5–6) – Game summary

Quarter	1	2	3	4	OT	Total
Warhawks	13	0	0	14	0	27
Ragin' Cajuns	14	3	0	10	3	30

at Our Lady of Lourdes Stadium • Lafayette, LA

- Date: November 29, 2025
- Game time: 2:00 PM CDT
- Game weather: Cloudy • Temperature: 70 °F (21 °C) • Wind: SE 11 mph
- Game attendance: 16,270
- Referee: Ted Pitts
- TV announcers (ESPN+): Dan McDonald (play-by-play), Scott Brazda (analyst) and Ben Schafer (sideline)

Game information

First quarter

- (14:47) LA – Ja'Corian Norris 96-yard kickoff return, Tony Sterner kick (Drive: 0 plays, 0 yards, 0:25; Louisiana 7–0)
- (13:19) ULM – Nic Trujillo 25-yard pass from Aidan Armenta, Jacob Chambliss PAT blocked (Drive: 4 plays, 75 yards, 1:28; Louisiana 7–6)
- (8:59) ULM – Zach Palmer-Smith 7-yard run, Jacob Chambliss kick (Drive: 7 plays, 70 yards, 3:28; Louisiana–Monroe 13–7)
- (4:01) LA – Steven Blanco 4-yard run, Tony Sterner kick (Drive: 5 plays, 43 yards, 2:09; Louisiana 14–13)

Second quarter

- (8:04) LA – Tony Sterner 55-yard field goal (Drive: 10 plays, 42 yards, 4:52; Louisiana 17–13)

Third quarter

- No scoring plays.

Fourth quarter

- (14:50) ULM – Jonathan Bibbs 68-yard pass from Aidan Armenta, Makenzie Ryan kick (Drive: 3 plays, 80 yards, 0:41; Louisiana–Monroe 20–17)
- (12:49) LA – Bill Davis 76-yard run, Tony Sterner kick (Drive: 4 plays, 85 yards, 1:58; Louisiana 24–20)
- (9:32) ULM – Nic Trujillo 43-yard pass from Aidan Armenta, Makenzie Ryan kick (Drive: 5 plays, 75 yards, 3:17; Louisiana–Monroe 27–24)
- (3:36) LA – Tony Sterner 30-yard field goal (Drive: 11 plays, 63 yards, 5:50; Tied 27–27)

Overtime

- LA – Tony Sterner 19-yard field goal (Drive: 5 plays, 24 yards; Louisiana 30–27)

Statistics	ULM	LA
First downs	29	17
Plays–yards	76–516	68–338
Rushes–yards	43–205	38–212
Passing yards	311	126
Passing: Comp–Att–Int	19–33–1	16–30–0
Turnovers	2	0
Time of possession	30:08	29:52

Team	Category	Player	Statistics
Louisiana–Monroe	Passing	Aidan Armenta	19/31, 311 yards, 3 TD
Louisiana–Monroe	Rushing	Zach Palmer-Smith	20 carries, 114 yards, TD
Louisiana–Monroe	Receiving	Nic Trujillo	4 receptions, 133 yards, 2 TD
Louisiana	Passing	Lunch Winfield	10/21, 82 yards
Louisiana	Rushing	Bill Davis	15 carries, 126 yards, TD
Louisiana	Receiving	Bill Davis	4 receptions, 33 yards

=== vs. Delaware (68 Ventures Bowl) ===
2025 68 Ventures Bowl
Louisiana Ragin' Cajuns (6–6) vs Delaware Fightin' Blue Hens (6–6) – Game summary

Quarter	1	2	3	4	Total
Ragin' Cajuns	0	3	3	7	13
Fightin' Blue Hens	7	3	10	0	20

at Hancock Whitney Stadium • Mobile, AL

- Date: December 17, 2025
- Game time: 7:30 PM CST
- Game weather: Overcast • Temperature: 61 °F (16 °C) • Wind: ESE at 3 mph (4.8 km/h)
- Game attendance: 17,234
- Referee: Reid Jackson
- TV announcers (ESPN): Clay Matvick (play-by-play), Max Browne (analyst) and Alyssa Lang (sideline)

Game information

First quarter

- (0:18) DEL – Jo Silver 61-yard run, Nate Reed kick (Drive: 5 plays, 80 yards, 2:28; Delaware 7–0)

Second quarter

- (7:05) LA – Tony Sterner 22-yard field goal (Drive: 16 plays, 70 yards, 8:13; Delaware 7–3)
- (0:28) DEL – Nate Reed 33-yard field goal (Drive: 12 plays, 49 yards, 3:29; Delaware 10–3)

Third quarter

- (12:40) DEL – Sean Wilson 35-yard pass from Nick Minicucci, Nate Reed kick (Drive: 6 plays, 70 yards, 2:15; Delaware 17–3)
- (6:59) DEL – Nate Reed 27-yard field goal (Drive: 10 plays, 62 yards, 4:19; Delaware 20–3)
- (2:31) LA – Tony Sterner 39-yard field goal (Drive: 10 plays, 53 yards, 4:28; Delaware 20–6)

Fourth quarter

- (7:49) LA – Shelton Sampson Jr. 8-yard pass from Lunch Winfield, Tony Sterner kick (Drive: 10 plays, 46 yards, 5:04; Delaware 20–13)

Statistics	LA	DEL
First downs	20	16
Plays–yards	77–335	60–334
Rushes–yards	39–104	30–158
Passing yards	231	176
Passing: Comp–Att–Int	21–38–1	19–30–0
Turnovers	3	0
Time of possession	33:55	26:05

Team	Category	Player	Statistics
Louisiana	Passing	Lunch Winfield	21/36, 231, TD, INT
Louisiana	Rushing	Lunch Winfield	14 carries, 40 yards
Louisiana	Receiving	Caden Jensen	4 receptions, 72 yards
Delaware	Passing	Nick Minicucci	19/30, 176 yards, TD
Delaware	Rushing	Jo Silver	14 carries, 116 yards, TD
Delaware	Receiving	Sean Wilson	8 receptions, 81 yards, TD
