= Walkers =

Walkers may refer to:

== Art, entertainment, and media ==
- Walkers, one name for zombies in The Walking Dead (franchise)
- Walkers (novel), a 1980 horror novel by Gary Brandner
- The Walkers (Danish band), a Danish glam rock band
- The Walkers (Dutch band), a Dutch band
- The Walkers, British band 1983 with Camelle Hinds and Canute Washington

== Brands and enterprises ==
- Walker Scott, a.k.a. Walker's, a former San Diego–based department store
- Walkers (law firm), a Cayman Islands–based offshore law firm
- Walkers (snack foods), British snack food manufacturer
- Walkers Limited, railway vehicle manufacturer in Maryborough, Queensland
- Walker's department store, or Walkers, a former California-based department store
- Walker's Nonsuch, an English toffee manufacturer
- Walker's Shortbread, a Scottish manufacturer of shortbread, biscuits, cookies and crackers

== Other uses ==
- Walkers, Virginia, United States
- Walkers Stadium, the former name of the home of Leicester City football club

== See also ==
- Walker (disambiguation)
- The Walkers (disambiguation)
