= Judge Walker =

Judge Walker may refer to:

- Jamar K. Walker (born 1986), judge of the United States District Court for the Eastern District of Virginia
- John M. Walker Jr. (born 1940), judge of the United States Court of Appeals for the Second Circuit
- Jonathan Hoge Walker (1754–1824), judge of the United States District Court for the Western District of Pennsylvania
- Justin R. Walker (born 1982), judge of the U.S. Court of Appeals for the District of Columbia Circuit
- Lance E. Walker (born 1972), judge of the United States District Court for the District of Maine
- Mark E. Walker (born 1967), judge of the United States District Court for the Northern District of Florida
- Richard Wilde Walker Jr. (1857–1936), judge of the United States Court of Appeals for the Fifth Circuit
- Thomas Glynn Walker (1899–1993), judge of the United States District Court for the District of New Jersey
- Thomas Joseph Walker (1877–1945), judge of the United States Customs Court
- Vaughn Walker (born 1944), judge of the United States District Court for the Northern District of California

== See also ==
- Justice Walker (disambiguation)
