= Walker Railey =

American Methodist minister

Personal life
- Born: June 25, 1947 (age 78) Owensboro, Kentucky, United States
- Spouse: Margaret Ellen "Peggy" Nicolai (m. 1971; div. 1997); Donna Berry (m. 1998)
- Children: 2
- Education: Southern Methodist University

Religious life
- Religion: Christianity
- Denomination: Methodism
- Church: First United Methodist Church

Senior pastor of First United Methodist Church
- In office 1980–1987

Walker Railey (born June 25, 1947) is an American former religious minister who was the senior pastor of the Dallas-based First United Methodist Church. He was tried for the attempted murder of his wife; although acquitted in criminal court, a civil court awarded an $18 million judgment against him.

== Early life ==
Railey was born on June 25, 1947, in Owensboro, Kentucky, the oldest of three children born to sheet metal worker Chester and his wife Virginia (née Bennett). While both his parents were alcoholics, Railey abstained from drinking or smoking. He wrote and delivered his first sermon at the age of 17 and majored in history at the Western Kentucky University. After studying for a year at the Vanderbilt Divinity School, Railey moved to Dallas to attend the Perkins Theological Seminary at Southern Methodist University (SMU). In August 1971, he married musician Margaret Ellen "Peggy" (née Nicolai; born October 7, 1948), who was also studying at SMU.

== Career ==
Railey completed his doctoral studies in ministry in 1973, and went on to minister in Oklahoma. In 1980, he was appointed as senior pastor of First United Methodist Church in Dallas, known as the "nation's mother church of Methodism" and where he had previously served as an associate pastor. In 1984, he led the North Texas Conference delegation to the quadrennial global conference of the United Methodist Church. Although "short, balding and physically unimposing", Railey was a charismatic speaker whose leadership led to a rise in church membership. Railey reportedly earned $100,000 a year as senior pastor. He frequently preached against racism, which apparently led to his receiving death threats from white supremacists; during his Easter sermon on April 19, 1987, Railey wore a bulletproof vest, based upon the advice of his security detail. However, subsequent investigations by the FBI suggested that Railey had written the anonymous threats himself.

== Legal history ==
=== Background ===
At 12:43 a.m. on April 22, 1987, Railey called the police to inform them that he had found his wife comatose in their home garage in Lake Highlands, Dallas. She was rushed to Presbyterian Hospital, where doctors determined that she had been choked and was experiencing hypoxia. According to detective Stan McNear, who led the investigation of her case, Walker Railey was "oddly serene" at the hospital; he initially claimed that he had been at the Southern Methodist University library at the time of the assault, but later stated that he had actually been with his paramour, clinical psychologist Lucy Goodrich Papillon. Led to believe that Peggy Railey had been attacked by white supremacists, hundreds of Railey's supporters gathered outside the hospital in the weekend. On April 30, Railey unsuccessfully attempted suicide by drug overdose at the hospital, writing in his suicide note that "there is a demon inside my soul ... (who) has finally gotten the upper hand". In July 1987, Railey testified before a grand jury and cited his Fifth Amendment rights some 43 times. After resigning from the church in early September 1987 and granting his friends John and Diane Yarrington custody of his children, Ryan (born 1981) and Megan (born 1983), Railey moved to California with Papillon in November 1987. In around 1991, he joined the Los Angeles-based Immanuel Presbyterian Church as executive administrator.

=== Civil trial ===
In 1988, Bill and Billie Jo Nicolai, the parents of Peggy Railey, filed a civil lawsuit against Walker Railey, who refused to respond. The trial lasted for a day, with judge John Whittington awarding $18 million in damages to the family. However, Railey declared bankruptcy and the settlement was set aside; in February 1997, with both parties agreed that Railey would divorce his wife and pay her a fortnightly alimony for twenty years.

=== Criminal trial ===
Although Railey remained the only suspect in his wife's attempted murder, no charges were brought against him by the police due to insufficient evidence. However, in August 1992, with the emergence of DNA evidence, Railey was arrested and officially charged with the attempted murder of his wife. The criminal trial of Walker Railey began on March 23, 1993. Judge Pat McDowell presided over the trial, which was relocated from Dallas to San Antonio in response to the extensive media coverage that it received. The full proceedings were broadcast on cable television channel Court TV, which achieved its highest ratings in Dallas during the trial. On April 17, 1993, the jury, which comprised seven women and three men, found Railey not guilty of all charges.

=== Aftermath ===
In October 1993, Railey gave an unpaid speech at a nursing home in Reseda, Los Angeles, in which he bemoaned that "every time a religious scandal hits the headlines, the stock of clergy goes down." He broke up with Papillon by the end of 1996 and married widow Donna Berry in April 1998. Peggy Railey remained incapacitated for the rest of her life; on December 25, 2011, at the age of 63, she died in a nursing home in Tyler, Texas.
