= Justice Walker =

Justice Walker may refer to:

- A. S. Walker (1826–1896), justice of the Texas Supreme Court
- Abram Joseph Walker (1819–1872), chief justice of the Supreme Court of Alabama
- Dawson A. Walker (c. 1820–1881), justice of the Supreme Court of Georgia
- David Walker (Arkansas politician) (1806–1879), justice of the Arkansas Supreme Court
- David S. Walker (1815–1891), justice of the Florida Supreme Court
- Moses B. Walker (1819–1895), justice of the Texas Supreme Court
- Pinkney H. Walker (1815–1885), chief justice of the Supreme Court of Illinois
- Platt D. Walker (1849–1923), justice of the North Carolina Supreme Court
- Reuben E. Walker (1851–1922), justice of the New Hampshire Supreme Court
- Richard Wilde Walker (1823–1874), associate justice of the Alabama Supreme Court
- Richard Wilde Walker Jr. (1857–1936), associate justice of the Alabama Supreme Court
- Robert F. Walker (1850–1930), justice of the Supreme Court of Missouri
- Ruel C. Walker (1910–1998), justice of the Texas Supreme Court
- William H. Walker (Vermont judge) (1832–1896), justice of the Vermont Supreme Court

== See also ==
- Judge Walker (disambiguation)
