= Walker Smith =

Walker Smith is the name of

- Walker Smith (cricketer) (1847–1900), English cricketer
- Walker Smith (hurdler) (1896–1993), American hurdler
- Sugar Ray Robinson (born Walker Smith Jr.; 1921–1989), American boxer
