= Walker Brook =

Stream in Clearwater County, Minnesota, U.S.

Coordinates: 47°31′07″N 95°23′20″W

Walker Brook is a stream in Clearwater County, Minnesota, United States.

Walker Brook was named for Thomas Barlow Walker, a businessperson in the lumber industry.

== See also ==
- List of rivers of Minnesota
