= Walker Brothers =

Walker Brothers may refer to:

- The Walker Brothers, British-based American pop music trio popular in the 1960s and 1970s
- Walker Bros., American pancake house company
- Walker Brothers (soap), early South Australian soap and candle manufacturer
- Walker Brothers (Wigan), English rolling stock manufacturer
