= First United Methodist Church (Dallas, Texas) =

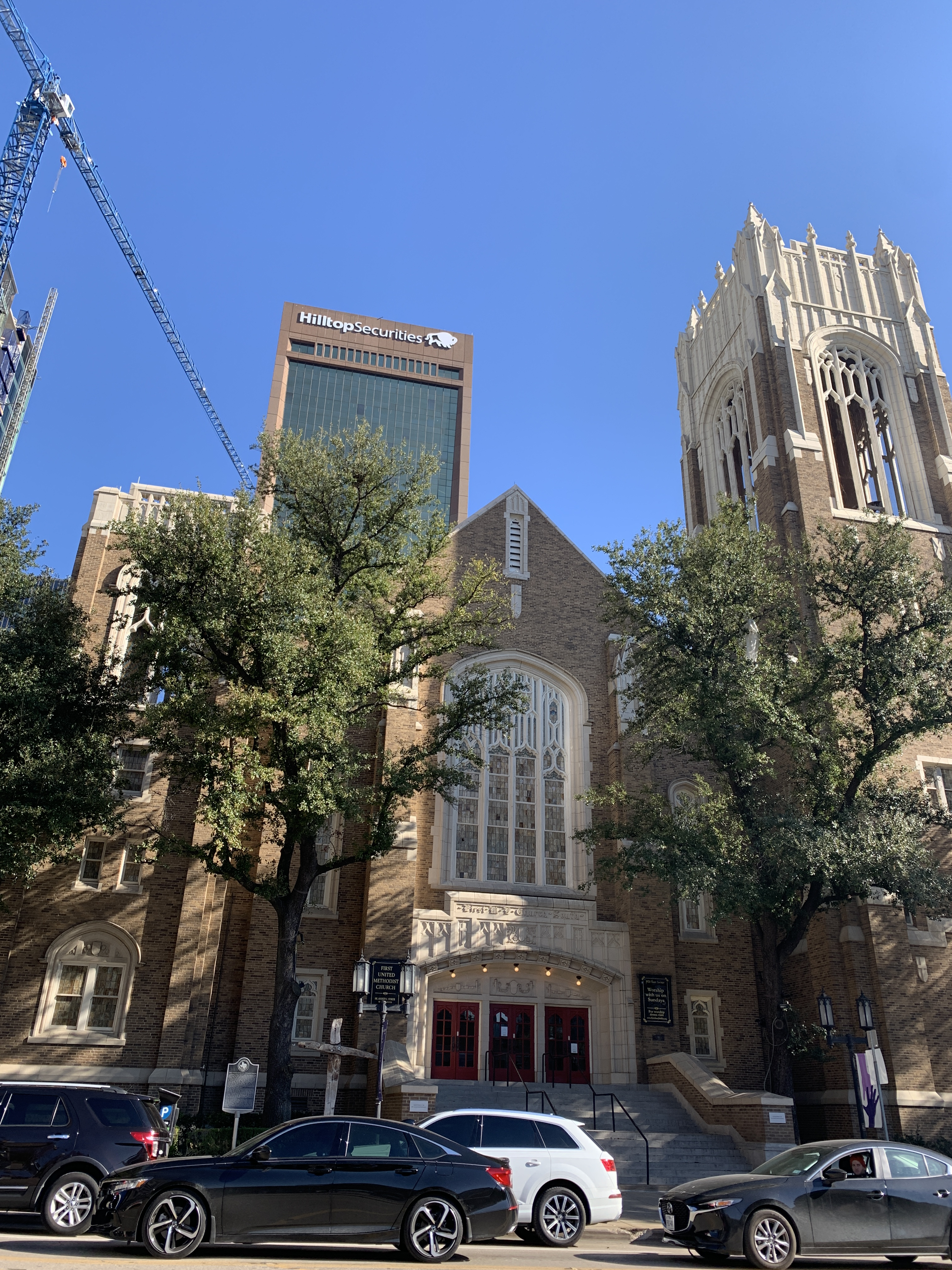
- First United Methodist Church
- 32.7865606°N 96.7995409°W
- Country: United States
- Denomination: Methodist
- Website: firstchurchdallas.org

History
- Status: Church
- Founded: February 7, 1846

Architecture
- Functional status: Active

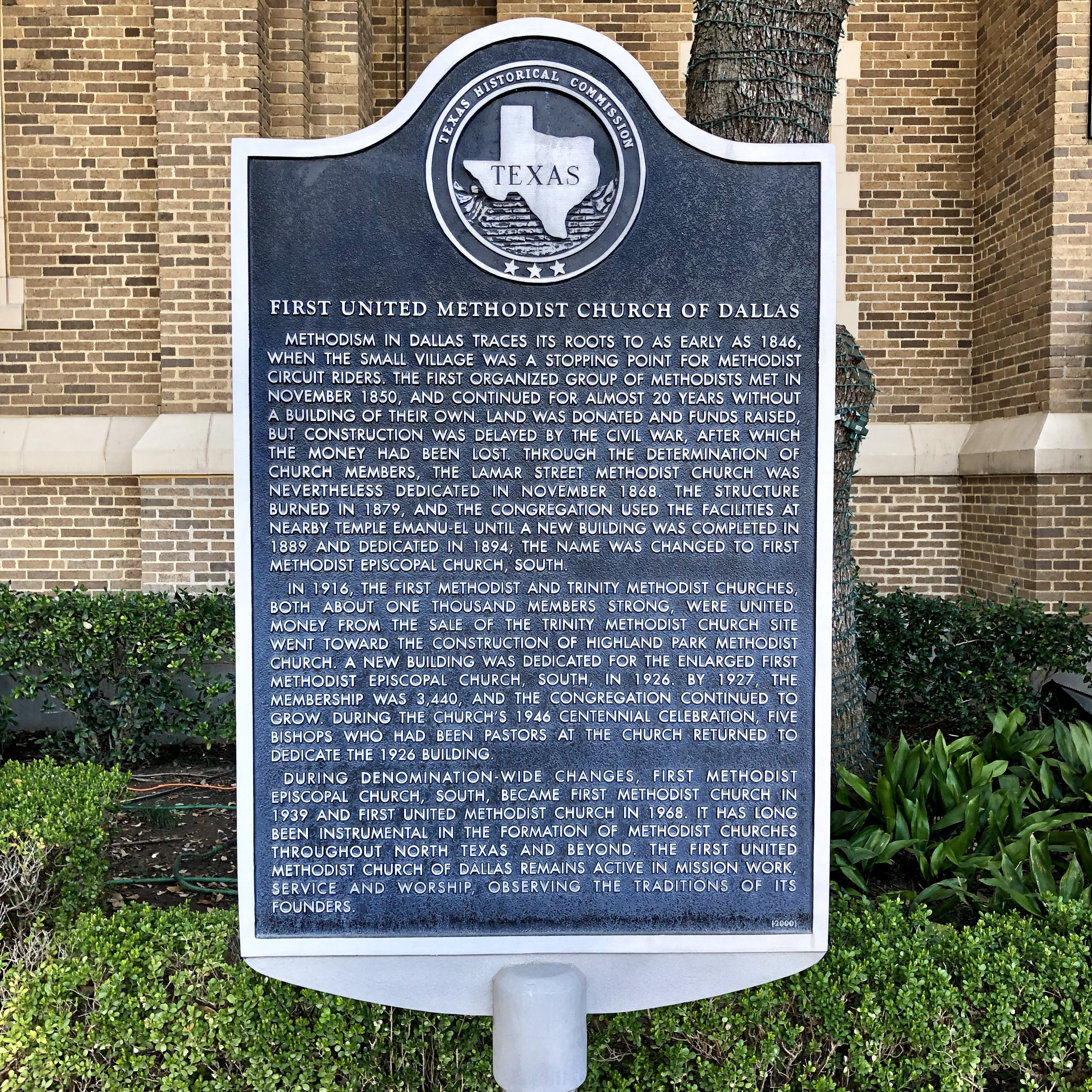
Historical marker

First United Methodist Church is a United Methodist church in Dallas, Texas. Its location in northeast downtown makes it part of the Dallas Arts District. The building opened on February 7, 1926. It was designed by Herbert M. Greene and R.H. Hunt.
