= Walker Township =

Walker Township may refer to:

== In Canada ==
- Walker Township, Cochrane District, Ontario

== In the United States ==
=== Arkansas ===
- Walker Township, Faulkner County, Arkansas
- Walker Township, Franklin County, Arkansas
- Walker Township, White County, Arkansas

=== Illinois ===
- Walker Township, Hancock County, Illinois

=== Indiana ===
- Walker Township, Jasper County, Indiana
- Walker Township, Rush County, Indiana

=== Kansas ===
- Walker Township, Anderson County, Kansas

=== Michigan ===
- Walker Township, Michigan

=== Missouri ===
- Walker Township, Henry County, Missouri
- Walker Township, Moniteau County, Missouri
- Walker Township, Vernon County, Missouri

=== Nebraska ===
- Walker Township, Platte County, Nebraska

=== North Dakota ===
- Walker Township, Hettinger County, North Dakota, in Hettinger County, North Dakota

=== Oklahoma ===
- Walker Township, Garvin County, Oklahoma

=== Pennsylvania ===
- Walker Township, Centre County, Pennsylvania
- Walker Township, Huntingdon County, Pennsylvania
- Walker Township, Juniata County, Pennsylvania
- Walker Township, Schuylkill County, Pennsylvania

== See also ==
- Walker (disambiguation)
