= Walker Howard =

American football player (born 2003)

No. 14 – Ole Miss Rebels
- Position: Quarterback
- Class: Redshirt Senior

Personal information
- Born: July 1, 2003 (age 23)
- Listed height: 6 ft 0 in (1.83 m)
- Listed weight: 195 lb (88 kg)

Career information
- High school: St. Thomas More (Lafayette, Louisiana)
- College: LSU (2022); Ole Miss (2023–2024); Louisiana (2025); Ole Miss (2026–present)
- Stats at ESPN

James Walker Howard IV (born July 1, 2003) is an American college football quarterback for the Ole Miss Rebels. He previously played for the LSU Tigers and Louisiana Ragin' Cajuns. He is the son of former LSU quarterback Jamie Howard.

== Early life ==
Howard grew up in Lafayette, Louisiana and attended St. Thomas More Catholic High School. During high school, Howard passed for 3,430 yards and 42 touchdowns and threw five interceptions as a junior. During his senior year, he threw for 2,394 yards and 25 touchdowns. He was rated a four-star recruit and committed to play college football at LSU over offers from Notre Dame, Alabama, Arizona State, Arkansas, Baylor, Boston College, Colorado, Florida Atlantic, Houston, Louisiana, Michigan State, Mississippi State, NC State, Nebraska, Nicholls State, Ole Miss, Penn State, TCU, Texas A&M, Tulane and USC.

== College career ==
=== LSU ===
Howard enrolled early at LSU in January 2022. During the 2022 season as a true freshman, he appeared in only two games with no starts. He made his debut against the home opener against Southern where he had three rushes for 15 yards. He also played for the 2023 Citrus Bowl where he took over the entire fourth quarter. He finished the season with completing 2 out of 4 passing attempts for 7 yards and 33 rushing yards on six carries.

On January 11, 2023, after the season ended, Howard entered the NCAA transfer portal. On January 18, 2023, Howard ultimately transferred to Ole Miss.

=== Ole Miss ===
Walker enrolled to Ole Miss in January 2023. During the annual spring game, Howard completed 11 out of 13 passes for 183 yards and four touchdowns.

On December 8, 2024, Howard announced that he would enter the transfer portal for the second time.

=== Louisiana ===
On December 10, 2024, Howard announced that he would transfer to Louisiana. On August 19, 2025, the Ragin' Cajuns announced that Howard would operate as their starter to begin the regular season.

=== College statistics ===
Season	Team	Games			Passing								Rushing			
Season	Team	GP	GS	Record	Cmp	Att	Pct	Yds	Avg	TD	Int	Rtg	Att	Yds	Avg	TD
2022	LSU	2	0	—	2	4	50.0	7	1.8	0	0	64.7	6	33	5.5	0
2023	Ole Miss	2	0	—	3	4	75.0	56	14.0	0	0	192.6	0	0	0.0	0
2024	Ole Miss	2	0	—	0	2	0.0	0	0.0	0	0	0.0	0	0	0.0	0
2025	Louisiana	6	1	0–1	18	41	43.9	155	3.8	0	3	61.0	15	82	5.5	1
Career		12	1	0–1	23	51	45.1	218	4.3	0	3	69.2	21	115	5.5	1

== Personal life ==
Howard's father, Jamie Howard, played quarterback at LSU.
