= The Walkers (Dutch band) =

Dutch band

The Walkers were a Dutch band of the 1970s, based in Maastricht. The group began as a skiffle group in 1963 and continued in mainstream pop music till 1989.
