= Hancock Whitney Stadium =

Stadium in Mobile, Alabama, US

Abe Mitchell Field at Hancock Whitney Stadium
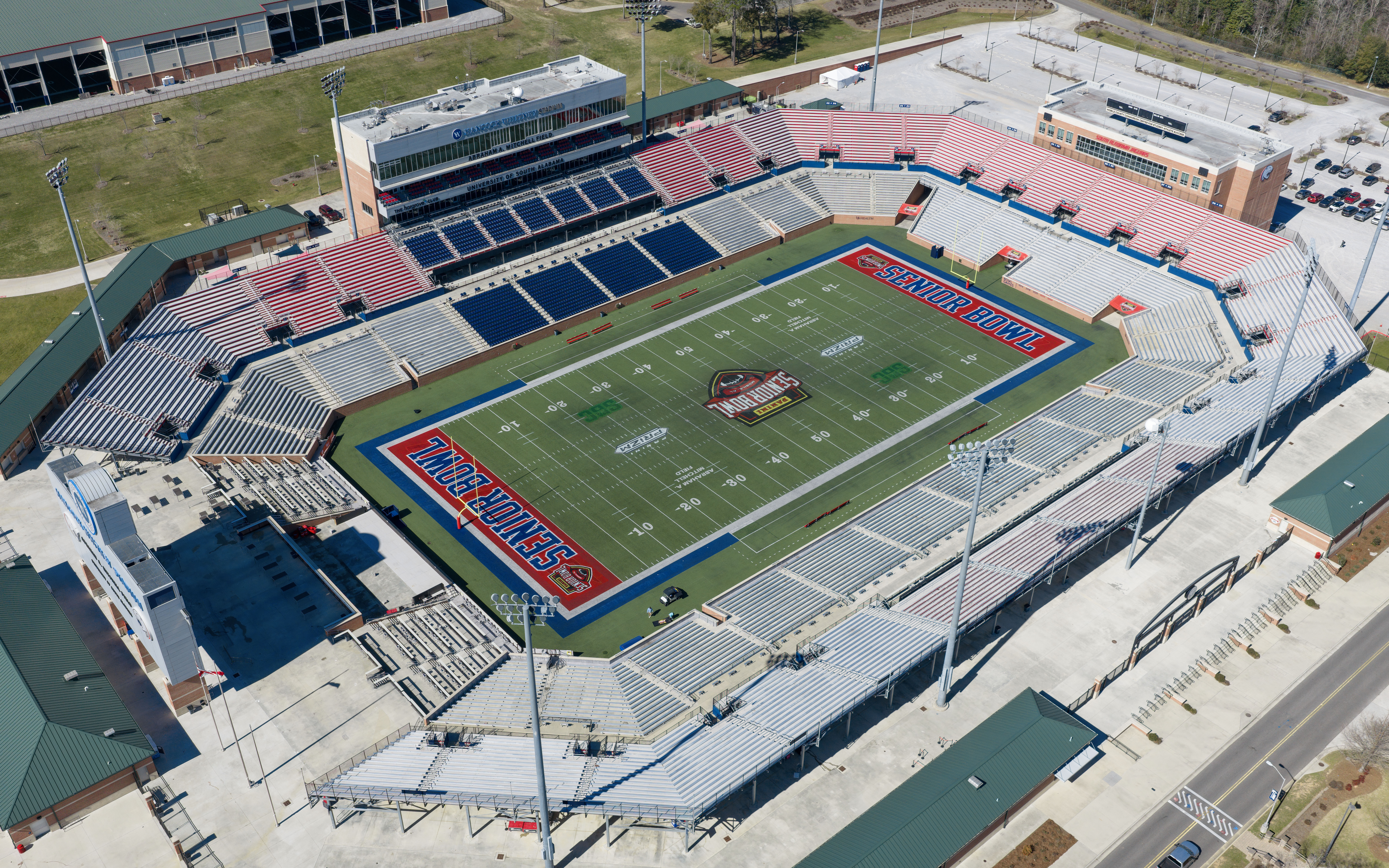
- The stadium in 2026

- Location in Alabama Location in the United States
- Location: Mobile, Alabama
- Coordinates: 30.696904°N 88.192013°W
- Owner: University of South Alabama
- Operator: University of South Alabama
- Capacity: 25,450
- Surface: FieldTurf
- Record attendance: 25,450 (twice)

Construction
- Groundbreaking: August 6, 2018
- Opened: September 12, 2020
- Cost: $78 million

Tenants
- South Alabama Jaguars (NCAA) (2020–present); Senior Bowl (2021–present); 68 Ventures Bowl (2021–present)

Hancock Whitney Stadium is a 25,450-seat multi-purpose stadium on the campus of the University of South Alabama in Mobile, Alabama. It is the home of the South Alabama Jaguars football program, starting with the 2020 season. The stadium replaced Ladd–Peebles Stadium, a city-owned all-purpose stadium located some 9 miles (14 km) from the campus where the school had played its football games since 2009. The stadium carries the name of Hancock Whitney, a bank holding company headquartered in Gulfport, Mississippi, while its playing surface is designated as the Abraham A. Mitchell Field, named after a substantial donor to the program. Hancock Whitney Stadium is located on the west part of the South Alabama campus near the football field house, practice fields, and Jaguar Training Center, which is the largest covered practice facility in the state of Alabama.

== History ==
Construction on Hancock Whitney Stadium started on August 6, 2018, and cost $78 million. The stadium opened with on September 12, 2020, with a college football game against the Tulane Green Wave. Due to COVID-19 restrictions, capacity for the opener and all other 2020 games was capped at 6,000 spectators to allow for social distancing.

Hancock Whitney Stadium serves as home of the Senior Bowl, a postseason college football all-star game, since the 2021 edition. The game had previously been held at Ladd–Peebles Stadium for nearly 70 years. Since the 2021 edition, Hancock Whitney Stadium has also served as home of the 68 Ventures Bowl, a postseason college bowl game, following 22 years at Ladd–Peebles.

== Facility features ==
- 11 Suites
- 42 Loge boxes
- Terrace standing room with drink rails (that can convert into a concert stage)
- Ample concourse room
- Up to 96 points-of-sale for concessions
- Musco LED lighting (ability to create light show)
- Daktronics high definition video board (top 40 in the country)
- Daktronics high definition ribbon boards and sound system

== Year by year ==
South Alabama Jaguars
Season	Average Crowd	Largest Crowd	Home Record
2020	5,449	6,000	2-4
2021	16,083	20,156	4-2
2022	16,646	25,450	5-1
2023	17,190	23,478	4-2
2024	18,169	25,450	3-3
2025	17,273	19,634	2-4
2026	14,373	15,232	3-0
Total			23–16 (.590)

== Attendance records ==
Rank	Attendance	Date	Game Result
1	25,450	October 15, 2024	South Alabama 25, Troy 9
2	25,450	October 20, 2022	South Alabama 6, Troy 10
3	23,478	October 17, 2023	South Alabama 55, Southern Miss 3
4	20,156	September 4, 2021	South Alabama 31, Southern Miss 7
5	19,667	November 2, 2024	South Alabama 30, Georgia Southern 34
6	19,634	October 14, 2025	South Alabama 14, Arkansas State 15
7	18,462	November 1, 2025	South Alabama 22, Louisiana 31
8	18,369	September 23, 2023	South Alabama 30, Central Michigan 34
9	17,939	September 24, 2022	South Alabama 38, Louisiana Tech 14
10	17,601	November 22, 2025	South Alabama 42, Southern Miss 35
