= Clay Matvick =

American sportscaster

Clay Matvick is an American sportscaster, who works primarily as a play-by-play announcer for ABC and the ESPN networks.

== Biography ==
Born in Saint Cloud, Minnesota, Matvick graduated from Princeton High School in 1991. He received a degree in mass communications from St. Cloud State University in 1996.

Matvick began his broadcasting career in 1990 in his hometown of Princeton, Minnesota, at WQPM (now BOB 106). He worked as a weekend sports anchor from 1990 to 1999 at various stations in Minnesota, KDLT in South Dakota and KMTV in Nebraska.

In 1999, Matvick was hired as a presenter for CNN Sports Illustrated in Atlanta, working there until 2001.

After leaving CNNSI, Matvick worked for Fox Sports Net North in Minneapolis from 2001 to 2005.

In 2004, Matvick began play-by-play for the Minnesota Boys High School Hockey Tournament.

In 2006, Matvick joined ESPN, handling play-by-play of college football, college basketball, hockey, baseball, softball, and the Little League World Series.

Matvick has won three Upper Midwest regional Emmy awards for his work covering the Minnesota Boys High School Hockey Tournament for KSTC-TV, in 2006, 2007, and 2008.

Matvick and his wife Lindsay live in Minnesota.
