= 2021 Liberty Flames football team =

American college football season

2021 Liberty Flames football

LendingTree Bowl champion

LendingTree Bowl, W 56–20 vs. Eastern Michigan
- Conference: Independent
- Record: 8–5
- Head coach: Hugh Freeze (3rd season)
- Co-offensive coordinators: Kent Austin (3rd season); Maurice Harris (3rd season)
- Offensive scheme: Multiple
- Defensive coordinator: Scott Symons (3rd season)
- Co-defensive coordinators: Josh Aldridge (3rd season); Jack Curtis (1st season)
- Base defense: 4–2–5
- Home stadium: Williams Stadium

2021 NCAA Division I FBS independents football records
	Conf.			Overall
Team	W		L	W		L
No. 8 Notre Dame		–		11	–	2
No. 19 BYU		–		10	–	3
Army		–		9	–	4
Liberty		–		8	–	5
New Mexico State		–		2	–	10
UMass		–		1	–	11
UConn		–		1	–	11
Rankings from AP Poll

The 2021 Liberty Flames football team represented Liberty University in the 2021 NCAA Division I FBS football season. They were led by third-year head coach Hugh Freeze and played their home games at Williams Stadium in Lynchburg, Virginia. The Flames competed as an FBS independent. They finished the regular season 7–5.

The Flames received an invite to the LendingTree Bowl where they played Eastern Michigan, winning 56–20.

== Schedule ==
Date	Time	Opponent	Site	TV	Result	Attendance
September 4	6:00 p.m.	Campbell	Williams Stadium; Lynchburg, VA	ESPN3	W 48–7	15,834
September 11	7:00 p.m.	at Troy	Veterans Memorial Stadium; Troy, AL	ESPN+	W 21–13	24,714
September 18	6:00 p.m	Old Dominion	Williams Stadium; Lynchburg, VA	ESPN3	W 45–17	18,471
September 24	8:00 p.m.	at Syracuse	Carrier Dome; Syracuse, NY	ACCN	L 21–24	29,942
October 2	7:00 p.m.	at UAB	Protective Stadium; Birmingham, AL	CBSSN	W 36–12	37,167
October 9	3:30 p.m.	Middle Tennessee^{†}	Williams Stadium; Lynchburg, VA	ESPN3	W 41–13	19,935
October 16	7:00 p.m.	at Louisiana–Monroe	Malone Stadium; Monroe, LA	ESPN+	L 28–31	11,546
October 23	4:00 p.m.	at North Texas	Apogee Stadium; Denton, TX	ESPN+	W 35–26	13,454
October 30	12:00 p.m.	UMass	Williams Stadium; Lynchburg, VA	ESPN3	W 62–17	16,577
November 6	12:00 p.m.	at No. 16 Ole Miss	Vaught–Hemingway Stadium; Oxford, MS	SECN	L 14–27	53,235
November 20	4:00 p.m.	Louisiana	Williams Stadium; Lynchburg, VA	ESPNU	L 14–42	15,564
November 27	12:00 p.m.	Army	Williams Stadium; Lynchburg, VA	ESPN+	L 16–31	19,269
December 18	5:45 p.m.	vs. Eastern Michigan	Hancock Whitney Stadium; Mobile, AL (LendingTree Bowl)	ESPN	W 56–20	15,186
^{†}Homecoming; Rankings from AP and CFP Rankings after November 2; All times are in Eastern time

== Roster ==
2021 Liberty Flames football team roster
Players
Coaches
Offense

Pos.	#	Name	Class
TE	0	Johnny Huntley	Sr
RB	1	Shedro Louis	So
WR	2	Kevin Shaa	Sr
WR	3	Demario Douglas	Fr
WR	4	C. J. Daniels	Fr
WR	5	D. J. Stubbs	Sr
WR	6	Jaivian Lofton	Jr
QB	7	Malik Willis	Jr
RB	8	Joshua Mack	Sr
QB	9	Sean Brown	Fr
QB	10	Nate Hampton	Fr
QB	11	Johnathan Bennett	So
TE	12	Trevor Hobbs	Sr
QB	13	Will Bowers	Fr
TE	14	Stetson Moore	So
RB	15	T. J. Green	Jr
WR	18	Ahmad Jackson	Fr
QB	18	Kaidon Salter	Fr
WR	19	Brody Brumm	Jr
RB	20	Troy Henderson	So
WR	21	Treon Sibley	Fr
RB	23	Malik Caper	Fr
RB	28	Tyron Staples	Sr
TE	30	Michael Bollinger	Jr
WR	31	Cole Peterlin	Jr
RB	33	Frank Boyd	Jr
RB	39	Russian Williams	Fr
TE	40	B. J. Wheat, Jr.	Fr
OL	50	Chase Mitchell	Fr
OL	51	Harrison Hayes	Fr
OL	52	Jonathan Graham	So
OL	53	Andrew Adair	Fr
OL	55	Brendan Schlittler	So
OL	56	Will Buchanan	Fr
OL	59	Damian Bounds	Sr
OL	60	Gage Bassham	Fr
OL	63	Carter Bradley	Jr
OL	64	Jacob Bodden	So
OL	65	Thomas Sargeant	Sr
OL	67	Jay Clark	Fr
OL	68	Tristan Schultz	Sr
OL	70	Boyd Rogish	Jr
OL	73	Hunter Porterfield	Fr
OL	74	Bryce Matthews	Sr
OL	75	Mason Bundy	Fr
OL	77	Cooper McCaw	Jr
OL	78	Brian Hannibal	Fr
OL	79	John Kourtis	So
WR	80	Kylen Austin	Fr
WR	81	Noah Firth	So
WR	82	D'Wayne Crawford	So
WR	83	Khaleb Coleman	Sr
TE	85	Trey Hatcher	So
WR	86	Eddie Ogle	Fr
TE	87	Brayden Monday	Fr
TE	88	Jerome Jackson	Jr
WR	89	Cade Rowland	Fr

Defense

Pos.	#	Name	Class
LB	0	Rashaad Harding	Sr
S	1	Javon Scruggs	Jr
DE	2	Kaci Seegars	Fr
DE	3	Stephen Sings V	Fr
CB	4	Chris Megginson	So
S	5	Skyler Thomas	Sr
S	6	Robert Rahimi	Fr
CB	8	Jimmy Faulks	Sr
S	9	Juawan Treadwell	Jr
DE	10	TreShaun Clark	So
DE	11	Durrell Johnson	Jr
LB	12	Storey Jackson	Sr
S	13	Jaylon Jimmerson	So
CB	14	Deon Biggins	Fr
DE	15	Jayod Sanders	Sr
S	16	Quinton Reese	Fr
S	17	Benjamin Alexander	Sr
CB	18	Isaiah Avery	Jr
LB	20	Jerome Jolly, Jr.	Fr
S	21	Sam Guridy	Fr
CB	22	Daijahn Anthony	So
S	23	Cedric Stone	Sr
DE	24	Aakil Washington	Fr
CB	26	Amarian Williams	Fr
LB	27	Micah Glaize	So
S	28	Chance Smith	Fr
CB	29	Duron Lowe	Sr
S	31	Tim Coutras	Fr
S	33	Aaron Lovins	Fr
LB	34	Ahmad Walker	Fr
LB	35	Tyren Dupree	So
S	36	Daniel Darko	Jr
LB	38	Cade Robinson	Jr
Fr	42	Micaiah Overton	Fr
LB	43	Joseph Carter	Fr
DE	44	Ike Okoye	Fr
DL	45	Jackson Shirer	Fr
DE	48	Rashad Whitehead	Fr
DT	50	Henry Chibueze	So
DT	55	Elijah James	Sr
DT	57	Carl Poole	Fr
DL	77	Khristian Zachary	Fr
DT	90	Karsen Parkins	Fr
DT	91	Kendy Charles	Fr
DL	92	Chris Boti	Fr
DT	93	William Green	Jr
DE	94	Jay Hardy	Fr
DL	96	Jonathan Slaughter	Fr
DL	97	Marquise Brunson	Fr
DT	99	Ralfs Rusins	Sr

Special teams

Pos.	#	Name	Class
K, P	37	Max Morgan	Fr
LS	41	Austin Mock	Jr
K	42	Nick Brown	Fr
P	46	Aidan Alves	Jr
LS	47	Austin Turner	Fr
LS	54	Andrew Johns	Fr
K	84	Brayden Beck	Fr
K, P	90	Jason Stricker	Fr
K, P	91	Jake Brickell	Fr

Head coach

- Hugh Freeze

Coordinators/assistant coaches

- Kent Austin Co-offensive coordinator/quarterbacks
- Maurice Harris Co-offensive coordinator/wide receivers
- Ben Aigamaua Tight ends
- Bruce Johnson Running backs
- Sam Gregg Offensive line
- Scott Symons Defensive coordinator/linebackers
- Josh Aldridge Co-defensive coordinator/linebackers
- Jack Curtis Co-defensive coordinator/safeties
- Rickey Hunley Cornerbacks
- Tanner Burns Special teams coordinator/outside linebackers
- Dominic Studzinski Associate head coach/Strength and conditioning

Legend

- (C) Team captain
- (S) Suspended
- (I) Ineligible
- Injured
- Redshirt

Roster

== Game summaries ==
=== Campbell ===
Campbell Fighting Camels at Liberty Flames – Game summary

Quarter	1	2	3	4	Total
Fighting Camels	0	7	0	0	7
Flames	14	6	14	14	48

at Williams Stadium, Lynchburg, Virginia

- Date: September 4
- Game time: 6:00 p.m. EDT
- Game weather: Temperature: 81 °F (27 °C) • Weather: Sunny • Wind: S 7 MPH
- Game attendance: 15,834
- Referee: Timot Hedgepeth
- TV announcers (ESPN3): Matt Warner, Joe Jauch and Emily Austen
- Box score

Game information

First quarter

- LIB – Demario Douglas 35-yard pass from Malik Willis (Alex Barbir kick), 11:18. Flames 7–0. Drive: 3 plays, 55 yards, 0:46.
- LIB – C. J. Daniels 0-yard fumble return (Alex Barbir kick), 4:57. Flames 14–0.

Second quarter

- CAM – Caleb Snead 40-yard pass from Hajj-Malik Williams (Isaac Riffle kick), 10:41. Flames 14–7. Drive: 2 plays, 50 yards, 0:39.
- LIB – Malik Willis 12-yard run (kick failed), 0:25. Flames 20–7. Drive: 9 plays, 80 yards, 3:01.

Third quarter

- LIB – Joshua Mack 1-yard run (Alex Barbir kick), 12:53. Flames 27–7. Drive: 4 plays, 28 yards, 2:03.
- LIB – Shedro Louis 36-yard run (Alex Barbir kick), 4:53. Flames 34–7. Drive: 9 plays, 85 yards, 4:20.

Fourth quarter

- LIB – Jaivan Lofton 27-yard pass from Johnathan Bennett (Alex Barbir kick), 10:46. Flames 41–7. Drive: 8 plays, 65 yards, 3:19.
- LIB – Johnathan Bennett 2-yard run (Alex Barbir kick), 1:18. Flames 48–7. Drive: 10 plays, 59 yards, 7:15.

Top passers

- CAM – Hajj-Malik Williams – 15/32, 183 yards, TD
- LIB – Malik Willis – 15/23, 217 yards, TD

Top rushers

- CAM – Hajj-Malik Williams – 4 rushes, 26 yards
- LIB – Joshua Mack – 19 rushes, 60 yards, TD

Top receivers

- CAM – Caleb Snead – 4 receptions, 70 yards, TD
- LIB – Demario Douglas – 7 receptions, 84 yards, TD

=== At Troy ===
Liberty Flames at Troy Trojans – Game summary

Quarter	1	2	3	4	Total
Flames	7	7	0	7	21
Trojans	7	0	0	6	13

at Veterans Memorial Stadium, Troy, Alabama

- Date: September 11
- Game time: 7:00 p.m. EDT / 6:00 p.m. CDT
- Game weather: Temperature: 83 °F (28 °C) • Weather: sunny • Wind: NW 7 MPH
- Game attendance: 24,714
- Referee: Jeff Maconaghy
- TV announcers (ESPN+): Will Kollmeyer and Ben Stanfield
- Box score

Game information

First quarter

- TROY – B. J. Smith 5-yard run (Brooks Buce kick), 9:40. Trojans 7–0. Drive: 13 plays, 75 yards, 5:20.
- LIB – Demario Douglas 32-yard pass from Malik Willis (Alex Barbir kick), 4:29. Tied 7–7. Drive: 9 plays, 75 yards, 5:11.

Second quarter

- LIB – Jerome Jackson 2-yard pass from Malik Willis (Alex Barbir kick), 7:29. Flames 14–7. Drive: 13 plays, 90 yards, 7:20.

Third quarter

- No scoring plays

Fourth quarter

- LIB – Malik Willis 4-yard run (Alex Barbir kick), 12:22. Flames 21–7. Drive: 8 plays, 90 yards, 4:44.
- TROY – Deyunkrea Lewis 11-yard pass from Taylor Powell (kick blocked), 1:14. Flames 21–13. Drive: 9 plays, 64 yards, 2:41.

Top passers

- LIB – Malik Willis – 13/18, 154 yards, 2 TD
- TROY – Taylor Powell – 18/25, 211 yards, TD, INT

Top rushers

- LIB – Malik Willis – 20 rushes, 93 yards, TD
- TROY – Kimani Vidal – 11 rushes, 38 yards

Top receivers

- LIB – Demario Douglas – 3 receptions, 41 yards, TD
- TROY – Luke Whittemore – 3 receptions, 70 yards

=== Old Dominion ===
Old Dominion Monarchs at Liberty Flames – Game summary

Quarter	1	2	3	4	Total
Monarchs	3	14	0	0	17
Flames	14	14	14	3	45

at Williams Stadium, Lynchburg, Virginia

- Date: September 18
- Game time: 6:00 p.m. EDT
- Game weather: Temperature: 86 °F (30 °C) • Weather: cloudy • Wind: SE 2 MPH
- Game attendance: 24,714
- Referee: Jeff Flanagan
- TV announcers (ESPN3): Matt Warner, Joe Jauch and Emily Austen
- Box score

Game information

First quarter

- LIB – C. J. Daniels 14-yard pass from Malik Willis (Alex Barbir kick), 11:25. Flames 7–0. Drive: 10 plays, 68 yards, 3:28.
- LIB – Malik Willis 17-yard run (Alex Barbir kick), 3:17. Flames 14–0. Drive: 6 plays, 79 yards, 2:45.
- ODU – Nick Rice 43-yard field goal, 0:46. Flames 14–3. Drive: 4 plays, 4 yards, 0:40.

Second quarter

- LIB – C. J. Daniels 33-yard pass from Malik Willis (Alex Barbir kick), 13:23. Flames 21–3. Drive: 6 plays, 80 yards, 2:18.
- ODU – Elijah Davis 1-yard run (Nick Rice kick), 6:29. Flames 21–10. Drive: 10 plays, 56 yards, 3:43.
- LIB – Kevin Shaa 38-yard pass from Malik Willis (Alex Barbir kick), 3:48. Flames 28–10. Drive: 7 plays, 60 yards, 2:31.
- ODU – Zack Kuntz 30-yard pass from D. J. Mack Jr. (Nick Rice kick), 0:42. Flames 28–17. Drive: 12 plays, 75 yards, 3:06.

Third quarter

- LIB – Kevin Shaa 8-yard pass from Malik Willis (Alex Barbir kick), 11:10. Flames 35–17. Drive: 4 plays, 48 yards, 2:00.
- LIB – Malik Willis 1-yard run (Alex Barbir kick), 5:18. Flames 42–17. Drive: 10 plays, 60 yards, 3:17.

Fourth quarter

- LIB – Alex Barbir 31-yard field goal, 3:29. Flames 45–17. Drive: 14 plays, 67 yards, 8:28.

Top passers

- ODU – D. J. Mack Jr. – 15/27, 134 yards, TD, INT
- LIB – Malik Willis – 21/28, 242 yards, 4 TD

Top rushers

- ODU – Elijah Davis – 11 rushes, 57 yards, TD
- LIB – Malik Willis – 9 rushes, 77 yards, 2 TD

Top receivers

- ODU – Zack Kuntz – 4 receptions, 60 yards, TD
- LIB – C. J. Daniels – 5 receptions, 70 yards, 2 TD

=== At Syracuse ===
Liberty Flames at Syracuse Orange – Game summary

Quarter	1	2	3	4	Total
Flames	0	7	7	7	21
Orange	0	14	7	3	24

at Carrier Dome, Syracuse, New York

- Date: September 24
- Game time: 8:00 p.m. EDT
- Game weather: None (played indoors)
- Game attendance: 29,942
- Referee: Stuart Mullins
- TV announcers (ACCN): Drew Carter, Bobby Carpenter and Taylor Davis
- Box score

Game information

First quarter

- No scoring plays

Second quarter

- SYR – Garrett Shrader 1-yard run (Andre Szmyt kick), 13:40. Orange 7–0. Drive: 12 plays, 92 yards, 5:18.
- SYR – Sean Tucker 27-yard run (Andre Szmyt kick), 9:51. Orange 14–0. Drive: 4 plays, 55 yards, 1:40.
- LIB – Shedro Louis 7-yard pass from Malik Willis (Alex Barbir kick), 1:33. Orange 14–7. Drive: 8 plays, 76 yards, 3:30.

Third quarter

- SYR – Garrett Shrader 10-yard run (Andre Szmyt kick), 9:46. Orange 21–7. Drive: 8 plays, 74 yards, 3:46.
- LIB – C. J. Daniels 23-yard pass from Malik Willis (Alex Barbir kick), 2:57. Orange 21–14. Drive: 9 plays, 73 yards, 3:18.

Fourth quarter

- LIB – Demario Douglas 33-yard pass from Malik Willis (Alex Barbir kick), 14:31. Tied 21–21. Drive: 5 plays, 45 yards, 1:27.
- SYR – Andre Szmyt 35-yard field goal, 0:00. Orange 24–21. Drive: 7 plays, 13 yards, 3:35.

Top passers

- LIB – Malik Willis – 14/19, 205 yards, 3 TD
- SYR – Garrett Shrader – 6/15, 77 yards

Top rushers

- LIB – Shedro Louis – 9 rushes, 59 yards
- SYR – Sean Tucker – 32 rushes, 169 yards, TD

Top receivers

- LIB – C. J. Daniels – 4 receptions, 86 yards, TD
- SYR – Sean Tucker – 2 receptions, 27 yards

=== At UAB ===
Liberty Flames at UAB Blazers – Game summary

Quarter	1	2	3	4	Total
Flames	0	3	21	12	36
Blazers	3	0	0	9	12

at Protective Stadium, Birmingham, Alabama

- Date: October 2
- Game time: 7:00 p.m. EDT / 6:00 p.m. CDT
- Game attendance: 37,167
- Referee: Jonathan Noli
- TV announcers (CBSSN): Dave Ryan and Corey Chavous
- Box score

Game information

First quarter

- UAB – Matt Quinn 37-yard field goal, 10:44. Blazers 3–0. Drive: 9 plays, 55 yards, 4:16.

Second quarter

- LIB – Brayden Beck 21-yard field goal, 8:54. Tied 3–3. Drive: 13 plays, 82 yards, 8:02.

Third quarter

- LIB – Malik Willis 8-yard run (Brayden Beck kick), 12:59. Flames 10–3. Drive: 6 plays, 75 yards, 2:01.
- LIB – C. J. Daniels 39-yard pass from Malik Willis (Brayden Beck kick), 10:33. Flames 17–3. Drive: 1 play, 39 yards, 0:13.
- LIB – Malik Willis 1-yard run (Brayden Beck kick), 3:11. Flames 24–3. Drive: 5 plays, 83 yards, 2:18.

Fourth quarter

- LIB – Joshua Mack 8-yard run (pass failed), 12:45. Flames 30–3. Drive: 7 plays, 73 yards, 4:14.
- LIB – Treon Sibley 33-yard pass from Johnathan Bennett (kick blocked), 6:21. Flames 36–3. Drive: 5 plays, 52 yards, 3:14.
- UAB – Mac McWilliams defensive PAT conversion, 6:21. Flames 36–5.
- UAB – Jermaine Brown Jr. 59-yard run (Matt Quinn kick), 4:53. Flames 36–12. Drive: 3 plays, 65 yards, 1:28.

Top passers

- LIB – Malik Willis – 13/19, 287 yards, TD
- UAB – Dylan Hopkins – 12/26, 152 yards, INT

Top rushers

- LIB – Malik Willis – 15 rushes, 144 yards, 2 TD
- UAB – Jermaine Brown Jr. – 9 rushes, 106 yards, TD

Top receivers

- LIB – Demario Douglas – 4 receptions, 128 yards
- UAB – RaJae' Johnson-Sanders – 1 reception, 53 yards

=== Middle Tennessee ===
Middle Tennessee Blue Raiders at Liberty Flames – Game summary

Quarter	1	2	3	4	Total
Blue Raiders	0	7	6	0	13
Flames	14	10	10	7	41

at Williams Stadium, Lynchburg, Virginia

- Date: October 9
- Game time: 3:30 p.m. EDT
- Game weather: Temperature: 69 °F (21 °C) • Weather: cloudy • Wind: NE 6 MPH
- Game attendance: 19,935
- Referee: Duane Heydt
- TV announcers (ESPN3): Matt Warner, Joe Jauch and Emily Austen
- Box score

Game information

First quarter

- LIB – Demario Douglas 35-yard pass from Malik Willis (Brayden Beck kick), 10:59. Flames 7–0. Drive: 3 plays, 45 yards, 1:19.
- LIB – Jerome Jackson 5-yard pass from Malik Willis (Brayden Beck kick), 0:13. Flames 14–0. Drive: 6 plays, 84 yards, 2:22.

Second quarter

- LIB – T. J. Green 1-yard run (Brayden Beck kick), 6:55. Flames 21–0. Drive: 11 plays, 80 yards, 5:31.
- MTSU – Jimmy Marshall 6-yard pass from Chase Cunningham (Zeke Rankin kick), 2:56. Flames 21–7. Drive: 9 plays, 84 yards, 3:51.
- LIB – Brayden Beck 37-yard field goal, 0:40. Flames 24–7. Drive: 10 plays, 74 yards, 2:10.

Third quarter

- LIB – Henry Chibueze tackled in end zone, 12:05. Flames 26–7.
- MTSU – Jarrin Pierce 31-yard pass from Chase Cunningham (pass failed), 8:07. Flames 26–13. Drive: 4 plays, 31 yards, 1:07.
- LIB – Joshua Mack 2-yard run (Malik Willis pass to Brody Brumm), 3:25. Flames 34–13. Drive: 8 plays, 67 yards, 4:33.

Fourth quarter

- LIB – Malik Willis 1-yard run (Brayden Beck kick), 4:17. Flames 41–13. Drive: 7 plays, 48 yards, 4:31.

Top passers

- MTSU – Chase Cunningham – 22/42, 230 yards, 2 TD, INT
- LIB – Malik Willis – 17/30, 222 yards, 2 TD, 3 INT

Top rushers

- MTSU – Chaton Mobley – 4 rushes, 8 yards
- LIB – Joshua Mack – 14 rushes, 91 yards, TD

Top receivers

- MTSU – Jimmy Marshall – 7 receptions, 77 yards, TD
- LIB – Demario Douglas – 6 receptions, 156 yards, TD

=== At Louisiana–Monroe ===
Liberty Flames at Louisiana–Monroe Warhawks – Game summary

Quarter	1	2	3	4	Total
Flames	0	14	0	14	28
Warhawks	0	0	28	3	31

at Malone Stadium, Monroe, Louisiana

- Date: October 16
- Game time: 7:00 p.m. EDT / 6:00 p.m. CDT
- Game weather: Temperature: 68 °F (20 °C) • Weather: Sunny • Wind: N 13 MPH
- Game attendance: 11,546
- Referee: Marshall Lewis
- TV: ESPN+
- Box score

Game information

First quarter

- No scoring plays

Second quarter

- LIB – Malik Willis 3-yard run (Brayden Beck kick), 5:11. Flames 7–0. Drive: 4 plays, 18 yards, 1:58.
- LIB – C. J. Daniels 9-yard pass from Malik Willis (Brayden Beck kick), 0:16. Flames 14–0. Drive: 8 plays, 85 yards, 1:33.

Third quarter

- ULM – Andrew Henry 12-yard pass from Chandler Rogers (Calum Sutherland kick), 11:09. Flames 14–7. Drive: 10 plays, 73 yards, 3:46.
- ULM – Abraham Alce 1-yard run (Calum Sutherland kick), 10:12. Tied 14–14. Drive: 1 play, 1 yard, 0:04.
- ULM – Andrew Henry 40-yard run (Calum Sutherland kick), 6:37. Warhawks 21–14. Drive: 5 plays, 68 yards, 2:09.
- ULM – Zach Rasmussen 14-yard pass from Chandler Rogers (Calum Sutherland kick), 1:22. Warhawks 28–14. Drive: 8 plays, 62 yards, 3:19.

Fourth quarter

- LIB – Shedro Louis 7-yard run (Brayden Beck kick), 13:42. Warhawks 28–21. Drive: 8 plays, 65 yards, 2:40.
- LIB – Malik Willis 53-yard run (Brayden Beck kick), 7:49. Tied 28–28. Drive: 3 plays, 60 yards, 0:40.
- ULM – Calum Sutherland 53-yard field goal, 1:44. Warhawks 31–28. Drive: 7 plays, 57 yards, 2:31.

Top passers

- LIB – Malik Willis – 16/28, 135 yards, TD, 3 INT
- ULM – Chandler Rogers – 16/25, 225 yards, 2 TD, INT

Top rushers

- LIB – Malik Willis – 23 rushes, 157 yards, 2 TD
- ULM – Andrew Henry – 15 rushes, 80 yards, TD

Top receivers

- LIB – D. J. Stubbs – 2 receptions, 32 yards
- ULM – Zach Jackson – 4 receptions, 47 yards

=== At North Texas ===
Liberty Flames at North Texas Mean Green – Game summary

Quarter	1	2	3	4	Total
Flames	0	14	14	7	35
Mean Green	7	13	6	0	26

at Apogee Stadium, Denton, Texas

- Date: October 23
- Game time: 4:00 p.m. EDT / 3:00 p.m. CDT
- Game weather: Temperature: 80 °F (27 °C) • Weather: sunny
- Game attendance: 13,454
- Referee: Joe Lehring
- TV announcers (ESPN+): Kyle Youmans and Hek’ma Harrison
- Box score

Game information

First quarter

- UNT – DeAndre Torrey 2-yard run (Aaron Beckham kick), 6:04. Mean Green 7–0. Drive: 6 plays, 37 yards, 2:10.

Second quarter

- LIB – Kevin Shaa 27-yard pass from Malik Willis (Brayden Beck kick), 11:15. Tied 7–7. Drive: 6 plays, 93 yards, 2:02.
- UNT – Ayo Adeyi 42-yard run (Aaron Beckham kick), 10:25. Mean Green 14–7. Drive: 3 plays, 65 yards, 0:50.
- UNT – Aaron Beckham 35-yard field goal, 6:14. Mean Green 17–7. Drive: 4 plays, 6 yards, 1:33.
- UNT – Aaron Beckham 27-yard field goal, 1:51. Mean Green 20–7. Drive: 11 plays, 35 yards, 3:09.
- LIB – C. J. Daniels 39-yard pass from Johnathan Bennett (Brayden Beck kick), 1:13. Mean Green 20–14. Drive: 5 plays, 90 yards, 0:35.

Third quarter

- UNT – Jason Pirtle 6-yard pass from Austin Aune (pass failed), 7:27. Mean Green 26–14. Drive: 14 plays, 89 yards, 6:06.
- LIB – C. J. Daniels 15-yard pass from Malik Willis (Brayden Beck kick), 5:16. Mean Green 26–21. Drive: 9 plays, 75 yards, 2:11.
- LIB – Demario Douglas 72-yard punt return (Brayden Beck kick), 3:03. Flames 28–26.

Fourth quarter

- LIB – Shedro Louis 37-yard pass from Malik Willis (Brayden Beck kick), 11:19. Flames 35–26. Drive: 10 plays, 97 yards, 3:35.

Top passers

- LIB – Malik Willis – 12/18, 217 yards, 3 TD
- UNT – Austin Aune – 22/35, 212 yards, TD, 2 INT

Top rushers

- LIB – T. J. Green – 5 rushes, 25 yards
- UNT – Ayo Adeyi – 16 rushes, 99 yards, TD

Top receivers

- LIB – C. J. Daniels – 7 receptions, 130 yards, 2 TD
- UNT – Damon Ward Jr. – 4 receptions, 57 yards

=== UMass ===
UMass Minutemen at Liberty Flames – Game summary

Quarter	1	2	3	4	Total
Minutemen	3	0	7	7	17
Flames	21	20	7	14	62

at Williams Stadium, Lynchburg, Virginia

- Date: October 30
- Game time: 12:00 p.m. EDT
- Game weather: Temperature: 58 °F (14 °C) • Weather: cloudy • Wind: SW 7 MPH
- Game attendance: 16,577
- Referee: Jerr Magallanes
- TV announcers (ESPN3): Matt Warner, Joe Jauch and Emily Austen
- Box score

Game information

First quarter

- LIB – T. J. Green 26-yard run (Brayden Beck kick), 14:46. Flames 7–0. Drive: 1 play, 26 yards, 0:08.
- LIB – Demario Douglas 6-yard pass from Malik Willis (Brayden Beck kick), 13:40. Flames 14–0. Drive: 1 play, 6 yards, 0:06.
- MASS – Cameron Carson 38-yard field goal, 11:07. Flames 14–3. Drive: 9 plays, 55 yards, 2:33.
- LIB – D. J. Stubbs 60-yard pass from Malik Willis (Brayden Beck kick), 5:42. Flames 21–3. Drive: 5 plays, 76 yards, 2:13.

Second quarter

- LIB – T. J. Green 29-yard run (kick failed), 9:28. Flames 27–3. Drive: 7 plays, 99 yards, 2:30.
- LIB – Noah Firth 49-yard pass from Malik Willis (Brayden Beck kick), 4:36. Flames 34–3. Drive: 2 plays, 72 yards, 0:58.
- LIB – Johnny Huntley 4-yard pass from Malik Willis (Brayden Beck kick), 0:05. Flames 41–3. Drive: 9 plays, 72 yards, 2:05.

Third quarter

- MASS – Rico Arnold 30-yard pass from Brady Olson (Cameron Carson kick), 9:38. Flames 41–10. Drive: 8 plays, 63 yards, 4:09.
- LIB – Shedro Louis 9-yard run (Brayden Beck kick), 6:15. Flames 48–10. Drive: 8 plays, 75 yards, 3:23.

Fourth quarter

- LIB – Brody Brumm 39-yard pass from Kaidon Salter (Brayden Beck kick), 13:29. Flames 55–10. Drive: 5 plays, 86 yards, 1:40.
- LIB – Khaleb Coleman 63-yard pass from Nate Hampton (Brayden Beck kick), 8:01. Flames 62–10. Drive: 5 plays, 92 yards, 3:19.
- MASS – Jared Chisari 8-yard run (Cameron Carson kick), 1:03. Flames 62–17. Drive: 13 plays, 75 yards, 6:58.

Top passers

- MASS – Brady Olson – 9/25, 74 yards, TD, INT
- LIB – Malik Willis – 19/27, 307 yards, 4 TD

Top rushers

- MASS – Ellis Merriweather – 24 rushes, 149 yards
- LIB – T. J. Green – 5 rushes, 60 yards, 2 TD

Top receivers

- MASS – Rico Arnold – 1 reception, 30 yards, TD
- LIB – D. J. Stubbs – 2 receptions, 72 yards, TD

=== At No. 16 Ole Miss ===
Liberty Flames at No. 16 Ole Miss Rebels – Game summary

Quarter	1	2	3	4	Total
Flames	0	0	14	0	14
No. 16 Rebels	10	14	3	0	27

at Vaught–Hemingway Stadium, Oxford, Mississippi

- Date: November 6
- Game time: 12:00 p.m. EDT / 11:00 p.m. CDT
- Game weather: Temperature: 52 °F (11 °C) • Weather: sunny • Wind: 0 MPH
- Game attendance: 53,235
- Referee: Marc Curles
- TV announcers (SECN): Dave Neal, Deuce McAllister and Andraya Carter
- Box score

Game information

First quarter

- MISS – Jerrion Ealy 70-yard run (Caden Costa kick), 14:26. Rebels 7–0. Drive: 2 plays, 75 yards, 0:34.
- MISS – Caden Costa 43-yard field goal, 1:22. Rebels 10–0. Drive: 5 plays, 54 yards, 1:18.

Second quarter

- MISS – Jerrion Ealy 4-yard run (Caden Costa kick), 13:13. Rebels 17–0. Drive: 4 plays, 58 yards, 0:56.
- MISS – Dannis Jackson 40-yard pass from Matt Corral (Caden Costa kick), 1:27. Rebels 24–0. Drive: 5 plays, 70 yards, 1:28.

Third quarter

- LIB – Shedro Louis 28-yard run (Brayden Beck kick), 10:31. Rebels 24–7. Drive: 8 plays, 75 yards, 4:29.
- MISS – Caden Costa 38-yard field goal, 6:49. Rebels 27–7. Drive: 9 plays, 54 yards, 3:42.
- LIB – Malik Willis 3-yard run (Brayden Beck kick), 1:08. Rebels 27–14. Drive: 11 plays, 73 yards, 5:41.

Fourth quarter

- No scoring plays

Top passers

- LIB – Malik Willis – 16/25, 173 yards, 3 INT
- MISS – Matt Corral – 20/27, 324 yards, TD

Top rushers

- LIB – Shedro Louis – 7 rushes, 101 yards, TD
- MISS – Jerrion Ealy – 10 rushes, 115 yards, 2 TD

Top receivers

- LIB – Demario Douglas – 5 receptions, 56 yards
- MISS – Dannis Jackson – 6 receptions, 126 yards, TD

=== Louisiana ===
Louisiana Ragin' Cajuns at Liberty Flames – Game summary

Quarter	1	2	3	4	Total
Ragin' Cajuns	7	14	7	14	42
Flames	0	7	7	0	14

at Williams Stadium, Lynchburg, Virginia

- Date: November 20
- Game time: 4:00 p.m. EST
- Game weather: Temperature: 48 °F (9 °C) • Weather: Sunny • Wind: S 3 MPH
- Game attendance: 15,564
- Referee: Wayne Winkler
- TV announcers (ESPNU): Kevin Brown and Hutson Mason
- Box score

Game information

First quarter

- UL – John Stephens Jr. 4-yard pass from Levi Lewis (Nate Snyder kick), 1:57. Ragin' Cajuns 7–0. Drive: 10 plays, 41 yards, 3:43.

Second quarter

- UL – Kyren Lacy 15-yard pass from Levi Lewis (Nate Snyder kick), 14:19. Ragin' Cajuns 14–0. Drive: 3 plays, 56 yards, 0:50.
- UL – Dalen Cambre 26-yard fumble return (Nate Snyder kick), 9:06. Ragin' Cajuns 21–0.
- LIB – Kevin Shaa 29-yard pass from Malik Willis (Brayden Beck kick), 7:14. Ragin' Cajuns 21–7. Drive: 6 plays, 78 yards, 1:46.

Third quarter

- LIB – Kevin Shaa 30-yard pass from Malik Willis (Brayden Beck kick), 11:57. Ragin' Cajuns 21–14. Drive: 3 plays, 40 yards, 1:18.
- UL – Montrell Johnson 2-yard run (Nate Snyder kick), 7:44. Ragin' Cajuns 28–14. Drive: 8 plays, 74 yards, 4:03.

Fourth quarter

- UL – Neal Johnson 2-yard pass from Levi Lewis (Nate Snyder kick), 14:11. Ragin' Cajuns 35–14. Drive: 6 plays, 65 yards, 2:22.
- UL – Emani Bailey 2-yard run (Nate Snyder kick), 2:26. Ragin' Cajuns 42–14. Drive: 12 plays, 66 yards, 7:58.

Top passers

- UL – Levi Lewis – 14/25, 166 yards, 3 TD
- LIB – Malik Willis – 14/34, 162 yards, 2 TD, 2 INT

Top rushers

- UL – Emani Bailey – 13 rushes, 60 yards, TD
- LIB – T. J. Green – 4 rushes, 56 yards

Top receivers

- UL – Peter LeBlanc – 2 receptions, 38 yards
- LIB – Kevin Shaa – 3 receptions, 72 yards, 2 TD

=== Army ===
Army Black Knights at Liberty Flames – Game summary

Quarter	1	2	3	4	Total
Black Knights	10	14	7	0	31
Flames	0	3	13	0	16

at Williams Stadium, Lynchburg, Virginia

- Date: November 27
- Game time: 12:00 p.m. EST
- Game weather: Temperature: 44 °F (7 °C) • Weather: Sunny • Wind: W 6 MPH
- Game attendance: 19,269
- Referee: Jeff Pumphrey
- TV announcers (ESPN+): Matt Warner, Joe Jauch and Emily Austen
- Box score

Game information

First quarter

- ARMY – Cole Talley 26-yard field goal, 6:48. Black Knights 3–0. Drive: 11 plays, 42 yards, 5:47.
- ARMY – Braheam Murphy 34-yard pass from Christian Anderson (Cole Talley kick), 0:17. Black Knights 10–0. Drive: 5 plays, 45 yards, 2:47.

Second quarter

- ARMY – Jakobi Buchanan 19-yard run (Cole Talley kick), 11:31. Black Knights 17–0. Drive: 5 plays, 44 yards, 2:33.
- ARMY – Jakobi Buchanan 1-yard run (Cole Talley kick), 6:48. Black Knights 24–0. Drive: 4 plays, 55 yards, 1:51.
- LIB – Brayden Beck 36-yard field goal, 3:20. Black Knights 24–3. Drive: 9 plays, 38 yards, 3:21.

Third quarter

- ARMY – Jakobi Buchanan 1-yard run (Cole Talley kick), 6:45. Black Knights 31–3. Drive: 14 plays, 75 yards, 8:15.
- LIB – Noah Firth 14-yard pass from Malik Willis (Brayden Beck kick), 4:35. Black Knights 31–10. Drive: 7 plays, 73 yards, 2:04.
- LIB – Malik Willis 7-yard run (run failed), 0:19. Black Knights 31–16. Drive: 8 plays, 85 yards, 1:58.

Fourth quarter

- No scoring plays

Top passers

- ARMY – Christian Anderson – 3/4, 102 yards, TD
- LIB – Malik Willis – 24/46, 305 yards, TD, INT

Top rushers

- ARMY – Jakobi Buchanan – 22 rushes, 80 yards, 3 TD
- LIB – Joshua Mack – 7 rushes, 38 yards

Top receivers

- ARMY – Tyrell Robinson – 1 reception, 51 yards
- LIB – C. J. Daniels – 8 receptions, 118 yards

=== Vs. Eastern Michigan (LendingTree Bowl) ===
Eastern Michigan Eagles vs. Liberty Flames (2021 LendingTree Bowl) – Game summary

Quarter	1	2	3	4	Total
Eagles	3	7	0	10	20
Flames	13	20	16	7	56

at Hancock Whitney Stadium, Mobile, Alabama

- Date: December 18
- Game time: 5:45 p.m. EST / 4:45 p.m. CST
- Game weather: Temperature: 71 °F (22 °C) • Weather: overcast, humid • Wind: N 7 MPH
- Game attendance: 15,186
- Referee: Trennis Livingston
- TV announcers (ESPN): Chris Cotter, Mark Herzlich and Jalyn Johnson
- Box score

Game information

First quarter

- EMU – Chad Ryland 27-yard field goal, 7:48. Eagles 3–0. Drive: 14 plays, 66 yards, 7:12.
- LIB – D. J. Stubbs 54-yard pass from Malik Willis (Brayden Beck kick), 3:08. Flames 7–3. Drive: 5 plays, 85 yards, 1:32.
- LIB – Skyler Thomas 27-yard interception return (kick failed), 2:27. Flames 13–3.

Second quarter

- EMU – Samson Evans 2-yard run (Chad Ryland kick), 13:01. Flames 13–10. Drive: 10 plays, 75 yards, 4:26.
- LIB – T. J. Green 24-yard run (kick failed), 12:07. Flames 19–10. Drive: 3 plays, 75 yards, 0:54.
- LIB – Johnny Huntley 20-yard pass from Malik Willis (Brayden Beck kick), 6:22. Flames 26–10. Drive: 12 plays, 88 yards, 3:32.
- LIB – Malik Willis 2-yard run (Brayden Beck kick), 0:16. Flames 33–10. Drive: 6 plays, 63 yards, 1:56.

Third quarter

- LIB – Malik Willis 35-yard run (run failed), 11:02. Flames 39–10. Drive: 2 plays, 52 yards, 0:34.
- LIB – Brayden Beck 43-yard field goal, 7:08. Flames 42–10. Drive: 5 plays, 19 yards, 1:32.
- LIB – Demario Douglas 2-yard pass from Malik Willis (Brayden Beck kick), 2:44. Flames 49–10. Drive: 9 plays, 73 yards, 3:22.

Fourth quarter

- LIB – Kevin Shaa 64-yard pass from Johnathan Bennett (Brayden Beck kick), 10:58. Flames 56–10. Drive: 1 play, 64 yards, 0:08.
- EMU – Chad Ryland 43-yard field goal, 5:26. Flames 56–13. Drive: 12 plays, 58 yards, 5:32.
- EMU – Jeff Hubbard 34-yard interception return (Chad Ryland kick), 4:29. Flames 56–20.

Top passers

- EMU – Ben Bryant – 23/36, 200 yards, INT
- LIB – Malik Willis – 13/24, 231 yards, 3 TD

Top rushers

- EMU – Samson Evans – 13 rushes, 52 yards, TD
- LIB – T. J. Green – 8 rushes, 88 yards, TD

Top receivers

- EMU – Hassan Beydoun – 11 receptions, 83 yards
- LIB – Kevin Shaa – 3 receptions, 94 yards, TD
