= 2021 LendingTree Bowl =

Postseason college football bowl game

- 23rd LendingTree Bowl
Eastern Michigan Eagles	Liberty Flames
(7–5)	(7–5)
MAC	Independent
20	56
Head coach: Chris Creighton	Head coach: Hugh Freeze
	1	2	3	4	Total
Eastern Michigan	3	7	0	10	20
Liberty	13	20	16	7	56
- Date: December 18, 2021
- Season: 2021
- Stadium: Hancock Whitney Stadium
- Location: Mobile, Alabama
- MVP: Malik Willis (QB, Liberty)
- Favorite: Liberty by 8.5
- Referee: Trennis Livingston (Sun Belt)
- Attendance: 15,186

United States TV coverage
- Network: ESPN
- Announcers: Chris Cotter (play-by-play), Mark Herzlich (analyst), and Jalyn Johnson (sideline)

The 2021 LendingTree Bowl was a college football bowl game played on December 18, 2021, and televised on ESPN. It was the 23rd edition of the LendingTree Bowl, and was one of the 2021–22 bowl games concluding the 2021 FBS football season. Online lending marketplace LendingTree was the game's title sponsor. This was the first LendingTree bowl to be played at Hancock Whitney Stadium, following 22 editions at Ladd–Peebles Stadium.

Originally scheduled to kickoff at 5:45 p.m. EST (4:45 p.m. local CST), the start of the game was pushed back 15 minutes due to local weather conditions. Liberty defeated Eastern Michigan, 56–20, to claim their third consecutive bowl victory.

== Teams ==
This will be the second meeting between Eastern Michigan and Liberty; the Flames defeated the Eagles (then known as the Hurons), 25–24, in Ypsilanti, Michigan, on October 14, 1989.

== Game summary ==
2021 LendingTree Bowl

Quarter	1	2	3	4	Total
Eastern Michigan	3	7	0	10	20
Liberty	13	20	16	7	56

at Hancock Whitney Stadium • Mobile, Alabama

- Date: Saturday, December 18, 2021
- Game time: 5:45 p.m. EST (4:45 p.m. local CST)
- Game weather: Overcast, humid • Temperature: 71 °F (22 °C) • Wind: N 7 mph (11 km/h)
- Game attendance: 15,186
- TV announcers (ESPN): Chris Cotter (play-by-play), Mark Herzlich (analyst), and Jalyn Johnson (sideline)
- Box score

Game information

First quarter

- 7:48 EMU – Chad Ryland 27-yard field goal. Drive: 14 plays, 66 yards, 7:12. Eastern Michigan 3–0
- 3:08 LIB – DJ Stubbs 54-yard pass from Malik Willis, Brayden Beck kick good. Drive: 5 plays, 85 yards, 1:32. Liberty 7–3
- 2:27 LIB – Skyler Thomas 27-yard interception return, Brayden Beck kick failed. Liberty 13–3

Second quarter

- 13:01 EMU – Samson Evans 2-yard run, Chad Ryland kick good. Drive: 10 plays, 75 yards, 4:26. Liberty 13–10
- 12:07 LIB – T. J. Green 24-yard run, Brayden Beck kick failed. Drive: 3 plays, 75 yards, 0:54. Liberty 19–10
- 6:22 LIB – Johnny Huntley 20-yard pass from Malik Willis, Brayden Beck kick good. Drive: 12 plays, 88 yards, 3:32. Liberty 26–10
- 0:16 LIB – Malik Willis 2-yard run, Brayden Beck kick good. Drive: 6 plays, 63 yards, 1:56. Liberty 33–10

Third quarter

- 11:02 LIB – Malik Willis 35-yard run, conversion run failed. Drive: 2 plays, 52 yards, 0:34. Liberty 39–10
- 7:08 LIB – Brayden Beck 43-yard field goal. Drive: 5 plays, 19 yards, 1:32. Liberty 42–10
- 2:44 LIB – Demario Douglas 2-yard pass from Malik Willis, Brayden Beck kick good. Drive: 9 plays, 73 yards, 3:22. Liberty 49–10

Fourth quarter

- 10:58 LIB – Kevin Shaa 64-yard pass from Johnathan Bennett, Brayden Beck kick good. Drive: 1 plays, 64 yards, 0:08. Liberty 56–10
- 5:26 EMU – Chad Ryland 43-yard field goal. Drive: 12 plays, 58 yards, 5:32. Liberty 56–13
- 4:29 EMU – Jeff Hubbard 34-yard interception return, Chad Ryland kick good. Liberty 56–20

=== Statistics ===
Statistics	EMU	LIB
First downs	23	21
Plays–yards	84–379	61–528
Rushes–yards	39–125	35–223
Passing yards	254	295
Passing: comp–att–int	28–44–1	14–26–1
Turnovers		
Time of possession	37:23	22:37

Team	Category	Player	Statistics
Eastern Michigan	Passing	Ben Bryant	23/36, 200 yards, INT
Eastern Michigan	Rushing	Samson Evans	13 carries, 52 yards, TD
Eastern Michigan	Receiving	Hassan Beydoun	11 receptions, 83 yards
Liberty	Passing	Malik Willis	13/24, 231 yards, 3 TD
Liberty	Rushing	T.J. Green	8 carries, 88 yards, TD
Liberty	Receiving	Kevin Shaa	3 receptions, 94 yards, TD
