= Malik Willis =

American football player (born 1999)

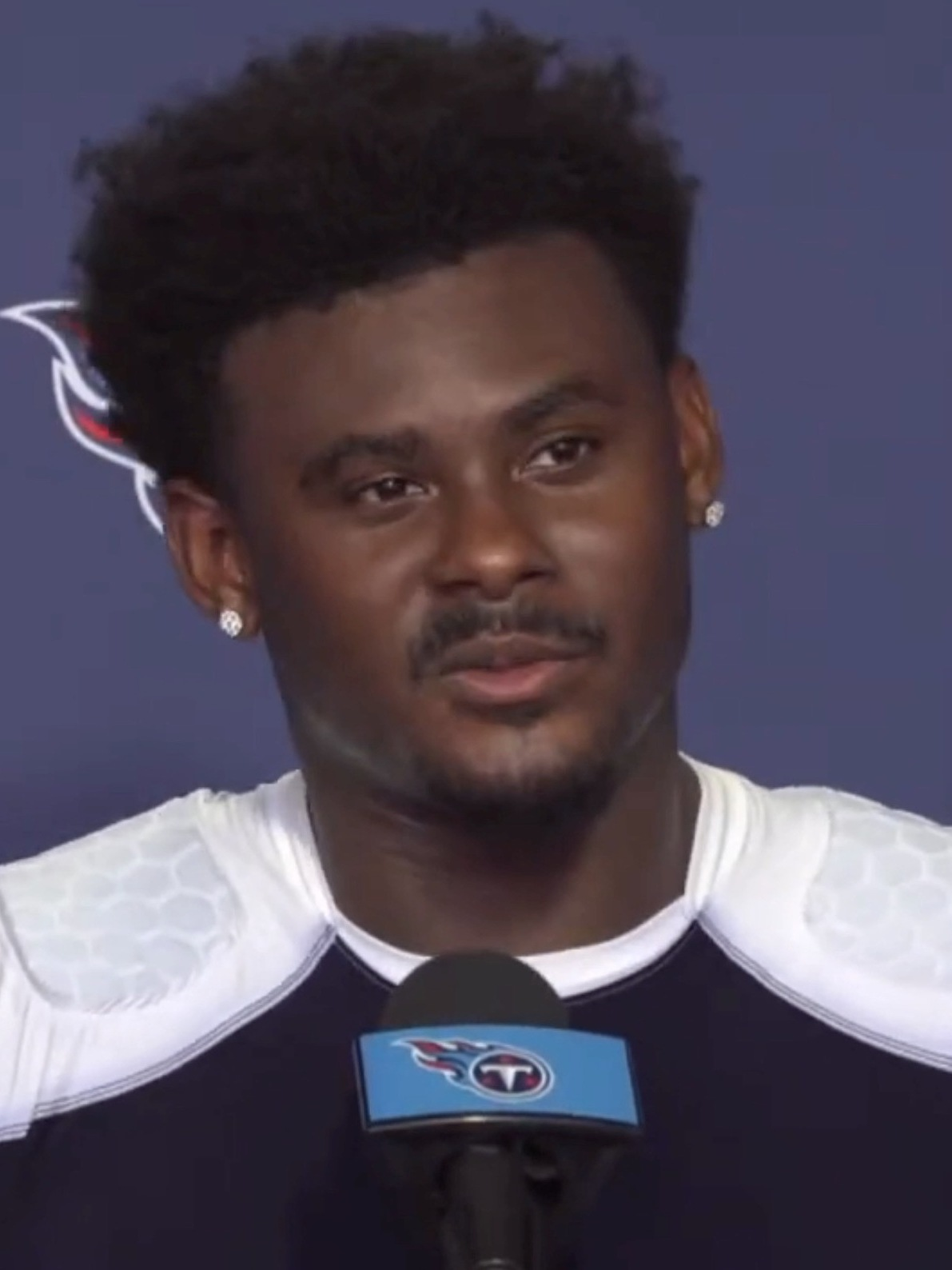
- Willis with the Tennessee Titans in 2022

No. 2 – Miami Dolphins
- Position: Quarterback
- Roster status: Injured reserve

Personal information
- Born: May 25, 1999 (age 27); College Park, Georgia, U.S.
- Listed height: 6 ft 1 in (1.85 m)
- Listed weight: 219 lb (99 kg)

Career information
- High school: Roswell (Roswell, Georgia)
- College: Auburn (2017–2018); Liberty (2019–2021)
- NFL draft: 2022: 3rd round, 86th overall pick

Career history
- Tennessee Titans (2022–2023); Green Bay Packers (2024–2025); Miami Dolphins (2026–present)

Awards and highlights
- Bobby Bowden Award (2021); Dudley Award (2020)

Career NFL statistics as of Week 9, 2026
- Passing attempts: 363
- Passing completions: 226
- Completion percentage: 62.3%
- TD–INT: 12–9
- Passing yards: 2,718
- Passer rating: 85.9
- Rushing yards: 637
- Rushing touchdowns: 7
- Stats at Pro Football Reference

Malik Antonio Willis (/məˈliːk/ mə-LEEK; born May 25, 1999) is an American professional football quarterback for the Miami Dolphins of the National Football League (NFL). He played college football for the Auburn Tigers and Liberty Flames, winning the 2020 Dudley Award with the latter. Willis was selected by the Tennessee Titans in the third round of the 2022 NFL draft and was traded to the Green Bay Packers in 2024. He served as a backup in Green Bay for two seasons before signing with the Dolphins in 2026.

== Early life ==
Willis attended Westlake High School in Atlanta before transferring to Roswell High School in Roswell, Georgia, for his senior year. As a senior, Willis passed for 2,562 yards and rushed for 1,033 yards with 37 total touchdowns. A three star recruit, he committed to Auburn University to play college football.

== College career ==
=== Auburn ===
Willis spent 2017 and 2018 at Auburn and played in 15 games. During the two years, he completed 11 of 14 passes for 69 yards and a touchdown and rushed for 309 yards and two touchdowns.

=== Liberty ===
Willis transferred to Liberty University in 2019 following a quarterback competition at Auburn with Bo Nix and sat out the season due to transfer rules.

In 2020, Willis was named the team's starting quarterback. Against the Southern Miss Golden Eagles, he threw for six touchdowns and rushed for another. Willis was named the winner of the 2020 Dudley Award, given to the best college football player in the state of Virginia, and was the recipient of the 2021 Bobby Bowden Award, awarded to the best college football player who epitomizes being a Christian student-athlete. He was named MVP of the 2020 Cure Bowl and the 2021 LendingTree Bowl.

== Professional career ==
Pre-draft measurables
Height	Weight	Arm length	Hand span	Wingspan	Wonderlic
6 ft 0 1/2 in (1.84 m)	219 lb (99 kg)	31 3/4 in (0.81 m)	9 1/2 in (0.24 m)	6 ft 5 3/8 in (1.97 m)	32
All values from NFL Combine

=== Tennessee Titans ===
==== 2022 season ====
Willis was selected in the third round (86th overall) of the 2022 NFL draft by the Tennessee Titans. He was considered a surprise fall in the draft as he was projected by some to be selected as high as second overall. Willis signed his four-year rookie contract on July 23, 2022.

Willis made his NFL debut in Week 2 against the Buffalo Bills in the third quarter after the Titans benched Ryan Tannehill. He completed one of four passes for six yards and rushed for 16 yards during the 41–7 road loss. Willis was named the starter for the Week 8 matchup against the Houston Texans, relieving Tannehill due to illness. In his first start, Willis completed 6 of 10 pass attempts for 55 yards and an interception during the 17–10 road victory. Willis started in place of an injured Tannehill the following week against the Kansas City Chiefs on Sunday Night Football. He completed 5-of-16 passes for 80 yards to go along with 40 rushing yards in the 20–17 overtime road loss. During Week 16 against the Texans, Willis again started in place of Tannehill, who had aggravated an ankle injury. Willis finished the 19–14 loss completing 14-of-23 passes for 99 yards and two interceptions, as well as rushing for 43 yards and a touchdown.

==== 2023 season ====
Willis only attempted five passes in 2023.

=== Green Bay Packers ===
==== 2024 season ====
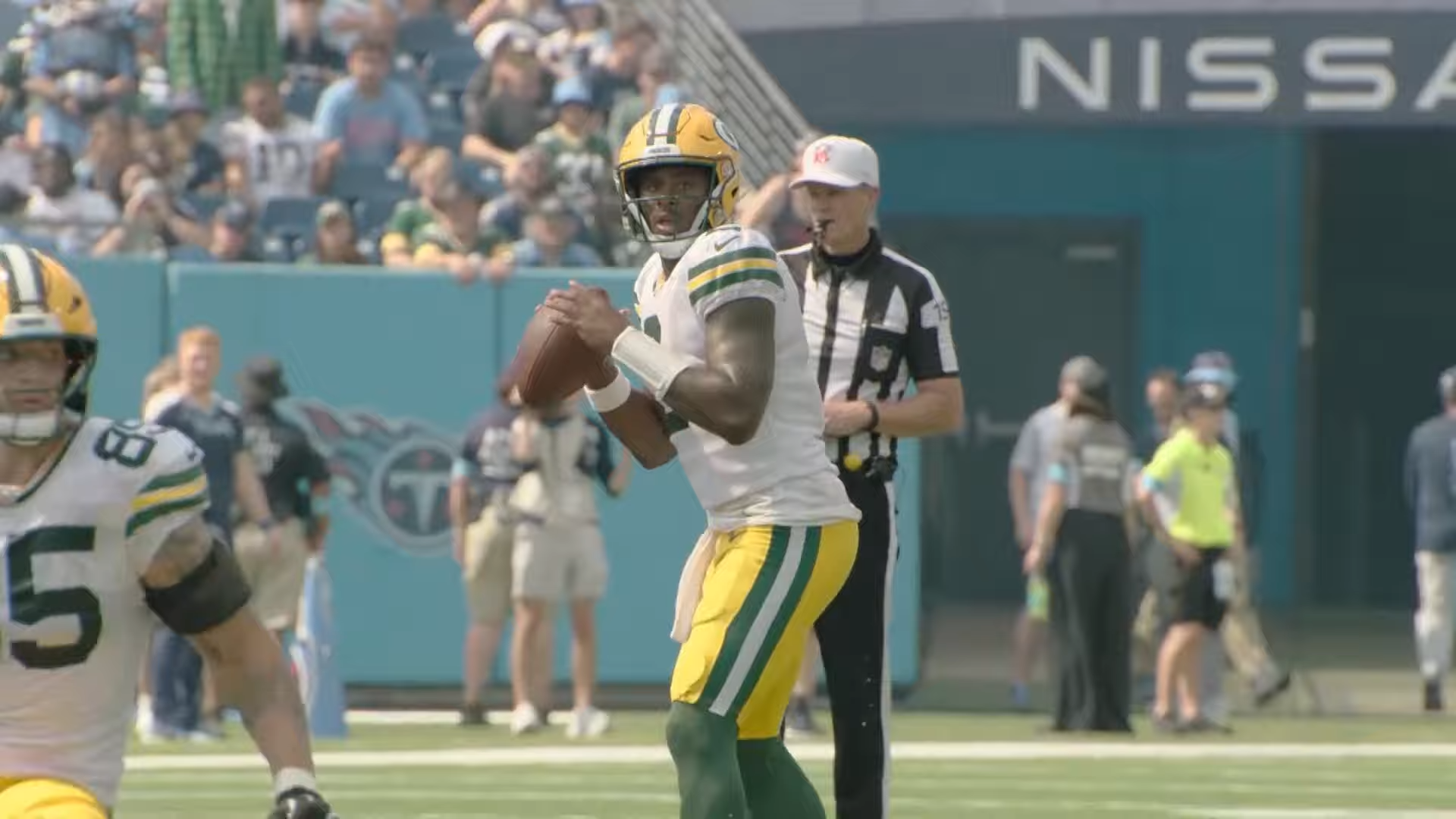
Willis in 2024

On August 26, 2024, Willis was traded to the Green Bay Packers for a seventh-round pick (No. 239) in the 2025 NFL draft.

After Jordan Love suffered an MCL sprain in the season opener against the Philadelphia Eagles, Willis was named the starter for the Week 2 matchup against the Indianapolis Colts. In his first start of the season, Willis completed 12-of-14 passes for 122 yards and his first NFL touchdown while also rushing for 41 yards in the 16–10 victory. In the next game against his former Titans, Willis completed 13-of-19 passes for 202 yards and a touchdown and led the team in rushing with 73 yards and a touchdown during the 30–14 road victory. With Love healthy, Willis did not appear again until Week 8 against the Jacksonville Jaguars, leading the Packers to a game-winning drive after Love left with a groin injury in the second half.

==== 2025 season ====
Willis did not make an appearance until the Week 11 27–20 road victory against the New York Giants. Taking over for an injured Jordan Love, Willis entered the game with the ball on the Giants' 40-yard line and capped a six-play drive with a touchdown pass before Love returned for the next series. During Week 16 against the Chicago Bears, Willis entered the game after Love suffered a concussion in the second quarter. Willis finished the 22–16 overtime road loss completing 9-of-11 passes for 121 yards and a touchdown while also rushing for 44 yards. He had his first start of the season during Week 17 at home against the Baltimore Ravens while Love was still out on concussion protocol. Willis completed 18-of-21 passes for 288 yards and a touchdown, while also rushing for 60 yards and 2 touchdowns, and finished the game with a 134.6 passer rating.

=== Miami Dolphins ===
On March 12, 2026, Willis signed with the Miami Dolphins on a three-year, $67.5 million deal.

== Career statistics ==
Legend
**Bold**	Career high

=== NFL ===
Year	Team	Games			Passing									Rushing					Sacked		Fumbles	
Year	Team	GP	GS	Record	Cmp	Att	Pct	Yds	Y/A	Lng	TD	Int	Rtg	Att	Yds	Y/A	Lng	TD	Sck	Yds	Fum	Lost
2022	TEN	**8**	3	1–2	31	61	50.8	276	4.5	48	0	3	42.8	27	123	4.6	17	1	10	49	**3**	**2**
2023	TEN	3	0	—	4	5	80.0	74	**14.8**	48	0	0	118.8	5	21	4.2	11	0	4	30	1	1
2024	GB	7	2	**2–0**	40	54	74.1	550	10.2	51	3	0	124.8	20	138	**6.9**	29	1	8	37	1	1
2025	GB	4	1	0–1	30	35	**85.7**	422	12.1	40	3	0	**145.5**	22	123	5.6	22	2	3	15	2	0
2026	MIA	**8**	**8**	1–7	**121**	**208**	58.2	**1,396**	6.7	**77**	**6**	**6**	76.1	38	232	6.1	**39**	**3**	24	124	5	0
Career		30	14	4–10	226	363	62.3	2,718	7.5	77	12	9	85.9	112	637	5.7	39	7	49	255	12	4
Source: pro-football-reference.com

=== College ===
Season	Team	Games			Passing							Rushing			
Season	Team	GP	GS	Record	Cmp	Att	Pct	Yds	TD	Int	Rtg	Att	Yds	Avg	TD
2017	Auburn	7	0	0–0	6	7	**85.7**	45	1	0	**186.9**	16	221	**13.8**	1
2018	Auburn	5	0	0–0	5	7	71.4	24	0	0	100.2	12	88	7.3	1
2019	Liberty	Did not play due to NCAA transfer rules													
2020	Liberty	10	10	**9–1**	170	265	64.2	2,260	20	6	156.2	141	**944**	6.7	**14**
2021	Liberty	**13**	**13**	8–5	**207**	**339**	61.1	**2,857**	**27**	**12**	151.1	**197**	878	4.5	13
Career		35	23	17–6	388	618	62.8	5,186	48	18	153.1	366	2,131	5.8	29
Source: sports-reference.com

== Personal life ==
Willis' uncle is former NFL linebacker James Anderson.

Willis was raised as and remains a Christian. Most of his social media posts conclude with "TGFE," which is short for "Thank God for Everything."
