= 2024 Pac-12 Conference football season =

American college football season

- League: NCAA Division I Football Bowl Subdivision
- Sport: Football
- Teams: 2
- TV partner(s): The CW, Fox Sports

2025 NFL draft
- Top draft pick: Kyle Williams, WR, Washington State
- Picked by: New England Patriots, 69th overall

Regular season

Football seasons
- 2023 2025

2024 Pac-12 Conference football standings
	Conf.			Overall
Team	W		L	W		L
Oregon State	1	–	0	5	–	7
Washington State	0	–	1	8	–	5

The 2024 Pac-12 Conference football season was the 46th season of Pac-12 football, and took place during the 2024 NCAA Division I FBS football season. Following conference realignment, every member school other than Oregon State and Washington State moved to a different conference for 2024. (Note: Former Pac-12 members UCLA, USC, Oregon, and Washington moved to the Big Ten. Arizona, Arizona State, Utah, and Colorado moved to the Big 12. Stanford and Cal moved to the ACC.) The season began on August 31, when both teams played their first regular-season game. The season ended on December 27, when Washington State competed in the Holiday Bowl.

On December 5, 2023, it was announced that Oregon State and Washington State had entered into a football alliance with the Mountain West Conference (MWC) for the 2024 season. Per the alliance, both Pac-12 programs played three home games and three away games against MWC opponents.

== Television ==
The CW and Fox Sports broadcast every Pac-12 home game nationally.

== Preseason ==
=== Recruiting classes ===
National rankings
Team	ESPN	Rivals	24/7	On3 recruits	Total signees
Oregon State	No. 69	No. 63	No. 87	No. 68	17
Washington State	No. 67	No. 57	No. 62	No. 66	24

=== Coaching ===
On November 28, 2023, Oregon State named Trent Bray as head coach replacing Jonathan Smith who accepted the same position at Michigan State.

Note: All stats current through the completion of the 2023 season

Team	Head coach	Year at school	Overall record	Record at school	Pac-12 record	Conference championships
Oregon State	Trent Bray	0	0–0	0–0	0–0	0
Washington State	Jake Dickert	3	15–16	15–16	9–13	0

== Schedule ==
Index to colors and formatting
Pac-12 member won
Pac-12 member lost
Pac-12 teams in **bold**

All times Pacific time.

† denotes Homecoming game

Rankings reflect those of the AP poll for weeks 1 through 9. Rankings from Week 10 until the end of the Season reflect those of the College Football Playoff Rankings.

=== Regular season ===
==== Week One ====
Date	Time	Visiting team	Home team	Site	TV	Result	Attendance	Ref.
August 31	12:00 p.m.	Portland State	**Washington State**	Martin Stadium • Pullman, WA	The CW	**W** 70–30	20,089	
August 31	3:30 p.m.	Idaho State	**Oregon State**	Reser Stadium • Corvallis, OR	The CW	**W** 38–15	31,013	
^{#}Rankings from AP Poll released prior to game. All times are in Pacific Time.

==== Week Two ====
Date	Time	Visiting team	Home team	Site	TV	Result	Attendance	Ref.
September 7	7:00 p.m.	Texas Tech	**Washington State**	Martin Stadium • Pullman, WA	Fox	**W** 37–16	27,372	
September 7	7:30 p.m.	**Oregon State**	San Diego State	Snapdragon Stadium • San Diego, CA	CBSSN	**W** 21–0	25,318	
^{#}Rankings from AP Poll released prior to game. All times are in Pacific Time.

==== Week Three ====
Date	Time	Visiting team	Home team	Site	TV	Result	Attendance	Ref.
September 14	12:30 p.m.	No. 9 Oregon	**Oregon State**	Reser Stadium • Corvallis, OR (rivalry)	Fox	**L** 14–49	38,419	
September 14	12:30 p.m.	**Washington State**	Washington	Lumen Field • Seattle, WA (Apple Cup)	Peacock	**W** 24–19	57,567	
^{#}Rankings from AP Poll released prior to game. All times are in Pacific Time.

==== Week Four ====
Date	Time	Visiting team	Home team	Site	TV	Result	Attendance	Ref.
September 20	7:00 p.m.	San Jose State	**Washington State**	Martin Stadium • Pullman, WA	The CW	**W** 54–52 ^{2OT}	24,808	
September 21	5:30 p.m.	Purdue	**Oregon State**	Reser Stadium • Corvallis, OR	The CW	**W** 38–21	34,340	
^{#}Rankings from AP Poll released prior to game. All times are in Pacific Time.

==== Week Five ====
Date	Time	Visiting team	Home team	Site	TV	Result	Attendance	Ref.
September 28	7:00 p.m.	**Washington State**	No. 25 Boise State	Albertsons Stadium • Boise, ID	FS1	**L** 24–45	37,711	
^{#}Rankings from AP Poll released prior to game. All times are in Pacific Time.

Date	Bye Week
September 28	Oregon State

==== Week Six ====
Date	Time	Visiting team	Home team	Site	TV	Result	Attendance	Ref.
October 5	3:30 p.m.	Colorado State	**Oregon State**	Reser Stadium • Corvallis, OR	The CW	**W** 39–31 ^{2OT}	36,433	
^{#}Rankings from AP Poll released prior to game. All times are in Pacific Time.

Date	Bye Week
October 5	Washington State

==== Week Seven ====
Date	Time	Visiting team	Home team	Site	TV	Result	Attendance	Ref.
October 12	4:30 p.m.	**Oregon State**	Nevada	Mackay Stadium • Reno, NV	CBSSN	**L** 37–42	21,541	
October 12	4:00 p.m.	**Washington State**	Fresno State	Valley Children's Stadium • Fresno, CA	FS1	**W** 25–17	41,031	
^{#}Rankings from AP Poll released prior to game. All times are in Pacific Time.

==== Week Eight ====
Date	Time	Visiting team	Home team	Site	TV	Result	Attendance	Ref.
October 19	12:30 p.m.	Hawaii	**Washington State**	Martin Stadium • Pullman, WA	The CW	**W** 42–10	25,112	
October 19	7:00 p.m.	UNLV	**Oregon State**	Reser Stadium • Corvallis, OR	The CW	**L** 25–33	35,195	
^{#}Rankings from AP Poll released prior to game. All times are in Pacific Time.

==== Week Nine ====
Date	Time	Visiting team	Home team	Site	TV	Result	Attendance	Ref.
October 26	7:30 p.m.	**Washington State**	San Diego State	Snapdragon Stadium • San Diego, CA	CBSSN	**W** 29–26	26,937	
October 26	1:00 p.m.	**Oregon State**	California	California Memorial Stadium • Berkeley, CA	ESPN2	**L** 7–44	33,090	
^{#}Rankings from AP Poll released prior to game. All times are in Pacific Time.

==== Week Ten ====
Date	Bye Week
November 2	Oregon State
November 2	#22 Washington State

==== Week Eleven ====
Date	Time	Visiting team	Home team	Site	TV	Result	Attendance	Ref.
November 9	12:30 p.m.	San Jose State	**Oregon State**	Reser Stadium • Corvallis, OR	The CW	**L** 13–24	37,187	
November 9	7:30 p.m.	Utah State	No. 20 **Washington State**	Martin Stadium • Pullman, WA	The CW	**W** 49–28	20,011	
^{#}Rankings from AP Poll released prior to game. All times are in Pacific Time.

==== Week Twelve ====
Date	Time	Visiting team	Home team	Site	TV	Result	Attendance	Ref.
November 16	12:30 p.m.	**Oregon State**	Air Force	Falcon Stadium • Colorado Springs, CO	CBSSN	**L** 0–28	21,385	
November 16	6:30 p.m.	No. 19 **Washington State**	New Mexico	University Stadium • Albuquerque, NM	FS1	**L** 35–38	14,067	
^{#}Rankings from AP Poll released prior to game. All times are in Pacific Time.

==== Week Thirteen ====
Date	Time	Visiting team	Home team	Site	TV	Result	Attendance	Ref.
November 23	4:00 p.m.	No. 25 **Washington State**	**Oregon State**	Reser Stadium • Corvallis, OR	The CW	**OSU** 41–38	38,008	
^{#}Rankings from AP Poll released prior to game. All times are in Pacific Time.

==== Week Fourteen ====
Date	Time	Visiting team	Home team	Site	TV	Result	Attendance	Ref.
November 29	9:00 a.m.	**Oregon State**	Boise State	Albertsons Stadium • Boise, ID	Fox	**L** 18–34	37,264	
November 30	3:30 p.m.	Wyoming	**Washington State**	Martin Stadium • Pullman, WA	The CW	**L** 14–15	17,088	
^{#}Rankings from AP Poll released prior to game. All times are in Pacific Time.

== Postseason ==
=== Bowl Games ===
Legend
Pac-12 win
Pac-12 loss

Bowl game	Date	Site	Television	Time (PST)	Pac-12 team	Opponent	Score	Attendance
Holiday Bowl	December 27, 2024	Snapdragon Stadium • San Diego, CA	FOX	5:00 p.m.	Washington State	No. 21 Syracuse	28–52	23,920
