= Pete Kaligis =

American football player and coach (born 1971)

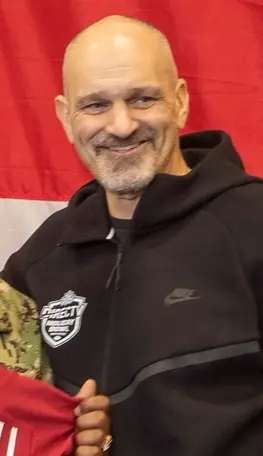
- Kaligis in 2024

Current position
- Title: Assistant head coach, and defensive tackles coach
- Team: Wake Forest
- Conference: ACC

Biographical details
- Born: January 6, 1971 (age 55); Bellingham, Washington, U.S.

Playing career
- 1990–1993: Washington
- Position: Guard

Coaching career (HC unless noted)
- 1994–1995: Western Washington (TE/strength)
- 1996–1997: Western Washington (DL/strength)
- 1998–1999: Meridian Middle School
- 1999–2001: Washington (assistant S&C)
- 2002–2004: Washington (S&C)
- 2005: Montana (TE/T)
- 2006–2008: Montana (OL)
- 2009–2011: Wyoming (OL)
- 2012–2015: Wyoming (AHC/OL/RB)
- 2016–2019: Wyoming (DT)
- 2020–2021: Wyoming (DRGC/DT)
- 2022–2024: Washington State (AHC/DT)
- 2024: Washington State (Interim HC/AHC/DT)
- 2025–present: Wake Forest (AHC/DT)

Head coaching record
- Overall: 0–1
- Bowls: 0–1

Accomplishments and honors

Championships
- National (1991)

Pete Kaligis (born January 6, 1971) is an American college football coach, currently the assistant head coach and defensive tackles coach at Wake Forest University. A two-sport athlete at the University of Washington in football and track and field, he was a starting guard for the 1991 national champions, a three-time Rose Bowl participant, and an All-American shot putter. Kaligis has been an assistant coach for various college football programs since 1994.

== High school ==
Born and raised in Bellingham, Washington, Kaligis graduated from Bellingham High School.

== College ==
Kaligis played college football at the University of Washington from 1990 to 1993, where he was an offensive lineman and an All-American in the shot put.

== Coaching ==
Following his playing career at Washington, Kaligis began a college football coaching career with stints at Western Washington, Washington, Montana, and Wyoming.

In 2012, Kaligis acted as head coach for Wyoming against Boise State while head coach Dave Christensen served a one-game suspension following a profanity-laced tirade after a one-point loss to Air Force two weeks earlier. Wyoming credits the entire season to Christensen.

On December 2, 2021, Washington State University announced the hiring of Kaligis as both assistant head coach and defensive tackles coach. Kaligis took over as interim head coach on December 18, 2024, after head coach Jake Dickert departed for Wake Forest.

== Head coaching record ==
Year	Team	Overall	Conference	Standing	Bowl/playoffs
Washington State Cougars (Pac-12 Conference) (2024)
2024	Washington State	0–1			L Holiday
Washington State:		0–1			
Total:		0–1			
