= 2024 Utah State Aggies football team =

American college football season

2024 Utah State Aggies football
- Conference: Mountain West Conference
- Record: 4–8 (3–4 MW)
- Head coach: Nate Dreiling (interim; 1st season)
- Offensive coordinator: Kyle Cefalo (2nd season)
- Co-offensive coordinator: Cooper Bassett (1st season)
- Offensive scheme: Spread option
- Co-defensive coordinator: Bobby McMillen (1st season)
- Base defense: 4–2–5
- Home stadium: Maverik Stadium

2024 Mountain West Conference football standings
	Conf.			Overall
Team	W		L	W		L
No. 8 Boise State y$^	7	–	0	12	–	2
No. 23 UNLV y	6	–	1	11	–	3
Colorado State	6	–	1	8	–	5
Fresno State	4	–	3	6	–	7
San Jose State	3	–	4	7	–	6
Air Force	3	–	4	5	–	7
Hawaii	3	–	4	5	–	7
New Mexico	3	–	4	5	–	7
Utah State	3	–	4	4	–	8
San Diego State	2	–	5	3	–	9
Wyoming	2	–	5	3	–	9
Nevada	0	–	7	3	–	10
Championship: Boise State 21, UNLV 7
^ – College Football Playoff participant; $ – Conference champion; y – Championship game participant; Rankings from AP Poll

The 2024 Utah State Aggies football team represented the Utah State University in the Mountain West Conference during the 2024 NCAA Division I FBS football season. The Aggies were led by interim head coach Nate Dreiling in his first year with the program. The Aggies played their home games at Maverik Stadium, located in Logan, Utah.

== Offseason ==
=== Coaching changes ===
On July 2, 2024, Utah State announced that it intended to fire head coach Blake Anderson following an internal investigation; Anderson was formally fired on July 18. Anderson was dismissed due to allegedly being non-compliant with the university's Title IX policies stemming from an incident that occurred in spring 2023. Defensive coordinator Nate Dreiling was named the Aggies' interim head coach.

== Preseason ==
=== Mountain West media poll ===
The Mountain West's preseason prediction poll was released on July 10, 2024. Utah State was predicted to finish in seventh place in the conference.

== Schedule ==
Date	Time	Opponent	Site	TV	Result	Attendance
August 31	6:00 p.m.	Robert Morris*	Maverik Stadium; Logan, UT	KMYU	W 36–14	17,037
September 7	9:00 p.m.	at No. 13 USC*	Los Angeles Memorial Coliseum; Los Angeles, CA	BTN	L 0–48	68,110
September 14	2:30 p.m.	No. 12 Utah*	Maverik Stadium; Logan, UT (Battle of the Brothers)	CBSSN	L 21–38	24,107
September 21	12:00 p.m.	at Temple*	Lincoln Financial Field; Philadelphia, PA	ESPN+	L 29–45	11,384
October 5	5:00 p.m.	at No. 21 Boise State	Albertsons Stadium; Boise, ID	FS2	L 30–62	37,210
October 11	7:00 p.m.	UNLV^{†}	Maverik Stadium; Logan, UT	CBSSN	L 34–50	20,295
October 19	2:00 p.m.	New Mexico	Maverik Stadium; Logan, UT	TruTV	L 45–50	14,584
October 26	5:00 p.m.	at Wyoming	War Memorial Stadium; Laramie, WY (rivalry)	CBSSN	W 27–25	17,724
November 9	8:30 p.m.	at No. 21 Washington State*	Martin Stadium; Pullman, WA	The CW	L 28–49	20,011
November 16	1:00 p.m.	Hawaii	Maverik Stadium; Logan, UT	SPEC PPV	W 55–10	13,348
November 23	1:30 p.m.	San Diego State	Maverik Stadium; Logan, UT	CBSSN	W 41–20	12,583
November 29	1:30 p.m.	at Colorado State	Canvas Stadium; Fort Collins, CO	FS1	L 37–42	24,772
*Non-conference game; ^{†}Homecoming; Rankings from AP Poll and CFP Rankings released prior to game; All times are in Mountain time

== Personnel ==
2024 Utah State Aggies football team roster
Players
Coaches
Offense

Pos.	#	Name	Class
WR	0	Robert Freeman IV	Jr
WR	1	Jalen Royals	Sr
WR	2	Robert Jr. Briggs	Jr
RB	3	Rahsul Faison	Sr
WR	5	Otto Tia	Jr
QB	7	Spencer Petras	Sr
WR	8	Grant Page	So
WR	9	Colby Bowman	GS
QB	10	C. J. Tiller	Fr
WR	11	Kahanu Davis	Jr
TE	12	Chase Tuatagaloa	So
WR	14	Jack Hestera	Jr
QB	15	Jacob Conover	Jr
QB	16	Bryson Barnes	Jr
QB	17	Braden Siri	Jr
WR	18	Jackson Olsen	Fr
QB	19	Levi Manning	So
WR	20	Tate Kjar	Fr
RB	21	Herschel Turner	Fr
RB	22	Derrick Jameson	So
WR	23	Kyrese White	GS
RB	24	Nick Floyd	Jr
RB	28	Tre Kofe	Fr
RB	29	Corbin Cottle	Fr
RB	30	Jonathan Baird	So
TE	33	Grayson Brousseau	Fr
OL	51	Jared Pele	Jr
OL	54	Teague Andersen	So
OL	55	Falepule Alo	Sr
OL	56	Cole Motes	Sr
OL	57	Trey Andersen	Jr
OL	60	Wyatt Bowles	GS
OL	61	K'leyone Iosua	Fr
OL	62	Aloali'i Maui	Jr
OL	64	Caysen Whittaker	Fr
OL	65	Tavo Motu'apuaka	So
OL	67	Adam Pond	So
OL	70	Jr Sia	Fr
OL	72	George Maile	So
OL	73	Elia Migao	Jr
OL	74	Jarvis Griffiths	Fr
OL	75	Bryce Radford	So
OL	76	Camden Jury	Fr
OL	78	Cole Keele	Fr
WR	81	Quentin Riley	So
WR	82	Cole Christensen	Fr
TE	83	Josh Sterzer	GS
TE	85	Noah Wright	Fr
TE	86	Will Monney	So
TE	87	Broc Lane	GS

Defense

Pos.	#	Name	Class
ILB	1	Jon Ross Maye	GS
CB	2	Jaiden Francois	GS
CB	3	J. D. Drew	So
CB	4	D. J. Graham II	Jr
DE	5	Marlin Dean	Jr
S	6	Ike Larsen	Jr
S	7	Omari Okeke	GS
DT	8	Taz Williams	Sr
DE	9	Blaine Spires	GS
DT	10	Gabriel Jr. Iniguez	Jr
DE	11	Gabe Peterson	Jr
S	12	Simeon Harris	Jr
CB	13	E. J. Fisk	Jr
ILB	14	Bronson Olevao Jr.	So
S	15	Torren Union	Sr
S	16	Terrell Taylor	Jr
CB	17	Avante Dickerson	Jr
S	19	Chase Davis	Fr
ILB	20	Cole Joyce	Jr
S	21	Malik McConico	So
CB	22	Mason Edwards	Jr
CB	23	Courage Ugo	Jr
S	24	Jordan Vincent	Sr
CB	25	Noah Flores	Fr
ILB	26	John Miller	Jr
ILB	27	Logan Pili	So
S	28	Gio Kafentzis	Fr
ILB	29	Nathan Wright	Fr
S	31	Kadiyon Sweat	Fr
ILB	32	Tanner Williams	Fr
ILB	33	Max Alford	So
S	34	Teeg Slone	So
ILB	39	Jadon Pearson	GS
DE	40	Zion Andreasen	Fr
DE	41	Carl Nesmith	Jr
ILB	42	Clyde Washington	GS
DT	44	Bo Maile	Jr
DE	45	Enoka Migao	Jr
DT	48	Seni Tuiaki	Jr
DE	50	Lawrence Falatea	Jr
DE	56	Ioholani Raass	Jr
DE	59	William Holmes	Fr
DT	90	Isaiah Bruce	So
DT	91	Braydon Bailey	Jr
DT	93	Bryan Vogl	Fr
DT	94	Siolaa Lolohea	Fr
DT	95	Miguel Jackson	Sr
DT	96	Manase Tupou	Fr
DE	98	Cian Slone	Sr
DT	99	Collin Vaughn	GS

Special teams

Pos.	#	Name	Class
K/P	47	Ryan Marks	So
LS	49	Jacob Garcia	GS
LS	52	Alexander McDougall	Fr
P	63	Stephen Kotsanlee	GS
K	88	Tanner Cragun	Fr
K	89	Elliott Nimrod	GS

Head coach

- Nate Dreiling – Interim head coach/defensive coordinator

Coordinators/assistant coaches

- Troy Morrell – Associate head coach/senior offensive analyst
- Kyle Cefalo – Offensive coordinator/wide receivers
- Cooper Bassett – Co-offensive coordinator/offensive line
- Bobby McMillen – Co-defensive coordinator/inside linebackers
- Nick Paremski – Special teams coordinator
- Ced Douglas – Defensive run game coordinator/defensive line
- D. J. Tialavea – Tight ends
- Jimmy Beal – Running backs
- Kwame Agyeman – Safeties
- Jalen Ortiz – Cornerbacks
- Hayden Kingston – Quarterbacks
- Paul Jackson – Director of athletic development
- Andy Koch – Assistant strength coach
- Steve Reyna – Assistant strength coach
- Aaron Bredsguard – Assistant strength coach
- Dave Wiemers – Senior defensive analyst
- Tim Burmeister – Senior defensive analyst
- Bobby Dodd – Senior special teams analyst
- Brandon Bowling – Offensive graduate assistant
- Cob Summers – Offensive graduate assistant
- Derrick Nsubuga – Defensive graduate assistant
- Bo Meisenheimer – Defensive graduate assistant
- Quinn Thomas – Defensive quality control

Legend

- (C) Team captain
- (S) Suspended
- (I) Ineligible
- Injured
- Redshirt

Roster
Last update: 09/2/24

== Game summaries ==
=== Robert Morris ===
Game One – Robert Morris Colonials (FCS) at Utah State Aggies – Game summary

Quarter	1	2	3	4	Total
Colonials (FCS)	0	14	0	0	14
Aggies	7	3	10	16	36

at Maverik Stadium, Logan, Utah

- Date: August 31
- Game time: 6:00 p.m. MDT
- Game weather: Sunny, 88 °F (31 °C)
- Game attendance: 17,037
- Referee: Michael Cuttone
- TV announcers (KMYU/Mountain West Network): Dave Fox, Alema Harrington, and Frank Dolce

Game information

First quarter

- (2:00) USU – Kyrese White 57-yard pass from Spencer Petras, Elliott Nimrod kick (Drive: 3 plays, 63 yards, 1:09; Utah State 7–0)

Second quarter

- (13:33) RMU – Cole Mitchell 40-yard pass from Anthony Chiccitt, Jayson Jenkins kick (Drive: 7 plays, 75 yards, 3:27; Tied 7–7)
- (9:30) USU – Elliott Nimrod 36-yard field goal (Drive: 9 plays, 56 yards, 4:03; Utah State 10–7)
- (0:41) RMU – Delvecchio Powell II 31-yard run, Jayson Jenkins kick (Drive: 7 plays, 80 yards, 2:04; Robert Morris 14–10)

Third quarter

- (10:33) USU – Kyrese White 53-yard pass from Bryson Barnes, Elliott Nimrod kick (Drive: 7 plays, 85 yards, 2:45; Utah State 17–14)
- (2:38) USU – Elliott Nimrod 50-yard field goal (Drive: 6 plays, 52 yards, 1:47; Utah State 20–14)

Fourth quarter

- (13:31) USU – Bryson Barnes 63-yard run (Drive: 2 plays, 71 yards, 0:37; Utah State 26–14)
- (10:57) USU – Jalen Royals 21-yard pass from Bryson Barnes, Elliott Nimrod kick (Drive: 2 plays, 76 yards, 0:26; Utah State 33–14)
- (1:49) USU – Elliott Nimrod 42-yard field goal (Drive: 9 plays, 67 yards, 5:21; Utah State 36–14)

Statistics	RMU	USU
First downs	18	23
Total yards	362	646
Rushing yards	137	303
Passing yards	225	343
Turnovers	1	3
Time of possession	34:22	25:38

Team	Category	Player	Statistics
Robert Morris	Passing	Anthony Chiccitt	22/30, 171 yards, TD, INT
Robert Morris	Rushing	Tyvon Edmonds Jr.	19 carries, 86 yards
Robert Morris	Receiving	Cole Mitchell	4 receptions, 60 yards, TD
Utah State	Passing	Bryson Barnes	11/21, 198 yards, 2 TD, INT
Utah State	Rushing	Robert Briggs Jr.	9 carries, 88 yards
Utah State	Receiving	Kyrese White	3 receptions, 131 yards, 2 TD

=== at No. 13 USC ===
Game Two – Utah State Aggies at No. 13 USC Trojans – Game summary

Quarter	1	2	3	4	Total
Aggies	0	0	0	0	0
No. 13 Trojans	10	17	7	14	48

at Los Angeles Memorial Coliseum, Los Angeles, California

- Date: September 7
- Game time: 9:00 p.m. MDT/8:00 p.m. PDT
- Game weather: Clear and Sunny, 80 °F (27 °C)
- Game attendance: 68,110
- Referee: Tim O'Dey
- TV announcers (BTN): Guy Haberman (play-by-play), Yogi Roth (analyst), and Rhett Lewis (sideline reporter)

Game information

First quarter

- (11:13) USC – Michael Lantz 23-yard field goal (Drive: 9 plays, 77 yards, 3:43; USC 3–0)
- (4:22) USC – Quinten Joyner 9-yard rush (Michael Lantz kick) (Drive: 8 plays, 88 yards, 3:05; USC 10–0)

Second quarter

- (13:06) USC – Woody Marks 2-yard rush (Michael Lantz kick) (Drive: 11 plays, 77 yards, 4:36; USC 17–0)
- (1:41) USC – Michael Lantz 24-yard field goal (Drive: 11 plays, 54 yards, 4:49; USC 20–0)
- (0:04) USC – Makai Lemon 6-yard pass from Miller Moss (Michael Lantz kick) (Drive: 8 plays, 40 yards, 1:10; USC 27–0)

Third quarter

- (5:31) USC – Quinten Joyner 2-yard rush (Michael Lantz kick) (Drive: 11 plays, 56 yards, 5:40; USC 34–0)

Fourth quarter

- (14:15) USC – Jayden Maiava 7-yard rush (Michael Lantz kick) (Drive; 9 plays, 59 yards, 4:08; USC 41–0)
- (6:32) USC – A'Marion Peterson 9-yard rush (Michael Lantz kick) (Drive: 7 plays, 51 yards, 3:40; USC 48–0)

Statistics	USU	USC
First downs	10	28
Total yards	190	548
Rushing yards	87	253
Passing yards	103	295
Turnovers	1	1
Time of possession	27:07	32:53

Team	Category	Player	Statistics
Utah State	Passing	Bryson Barnes	18/27, 103 yards, INT
Utah State	Rushing	Rahsul Faison	9 carries, 54 yards
Utah State	Receiving	Jalen Royals	6 receptions, 47 yards
USC	Passing	Miller Moss	21/30, 229 yards, TD
USC	Rushing	Woody Marks	13 carries, 103 yards, TD
USC	Receiving	Lake McRee	4 receptions, 81 yards

=== Utah ===
Game Three – No. 12 Utah Utes at Utah State Aggies – Game summary

Quarter	1	2	3	4	Total
No. 12 Utes	3	14	11	10	38
Aggies	7	7	7	0	21

at Maverik Stadium, Logan, Utah

- Date: September 14
- Game time: 2:30 p.m. MDT
- Game weather: Sunny, 80 °F (27 °C)
- Game attendance: 25,513
- Referee: Cravonne Barrett
- TV announcers (CBSSN): Dave Ryan (play-by-play), Robert Turbin (analyst), and Tina Cervasio (sideline reporter)

Game information

First quarter
Second quarter
Third quarter
Fourth quarter

Statistics	UTAH	USU
First downs	23	14
Total yards	460	385
Rushing yards	221	140
Passing yards	239	245
Turnovers	1	2
Time of possession	37:18	22:42

Team	Category	Player	Statistics
Utah	Passing	Isaac Wilson	20/33, 239 yards, 3 TD, INT
Utah	Rushing	Micah Bernard	17 carries, 123 yards, TD
Utah	Receiving	Brant Kuithe	3 receptions, 68 yards
Utah State	Passing	Bryson Barnes	16/31, 223 yards, 2 TD, 2 INT
Utah State	Rushing	Rahsul Faison	19 carries, 115 yards
Utah State	Receiving	Otto Tia	5 receptions, 78 yards

=== at Temple ===
Utah State Aggies at Temple Owls – Game summary

Quarter	1	2	3	4	Total
Aggies	0	21	0	8	29
Owls	0	17	7	21	45

at Lincoln Financial Field, Philadelphia, Pennsylvania

- Date: September 21
- Game time: 12:00 p.m. MDT/2:00 p.m. EDT
- Game weather: Sunny • Temperature: 78 °F (26 °C) • Wind: NE at 3 miles per hour (4.8 km/h)
- Game attendance: 11,384
- Referee: Edwin Lee
- TV announcers (ESPN+): Shawn Kenney (play-by-play) and Barrett Brooks (analyst)

Game information

First quarter

No scoring plays.

Second quarter

- (14:30) USU – Herschel Turner 4-yard run, Elliott Nimrod kick (Drive: 6 plays, 37 yards, 1:11; Utah State 7–0.)
- (11:19) USU – Jalen Royals 26-yard pass from Spencer Petras, Elliott Nimrod kick (Drive: 5 plays, 48 yards, 2:11; Utah State 14–0.)
- (7:50) TEM – Antonio Jones 32-yard pass from Evan Simon, Maddux Trujillo kick (Drive: 8 plays, 78 yards, 3:24; Utah State 14–7.)
- (1:10) TEM – Antwain Littleton II 17-yard pass from Evan Simon, Maddux Trujillo kick (Drive: 10 plays, 65 yards, 5:17; Tied 14–14.)
- (0:17) USU – Rahsul Faison 20-yard run, Elliott Nimrod kick (Drive: 6 plays, 75 yards, 0:53; Utah State 21–14.)
- (0:00) TEM – Maddux Trujillo 64-yard field goal (Drive: 2 plays, 11 yards, 0:10; Utah State 21–17.)

Third quarter

- (4:10) TEM – Dante Wright 91-yard pass from Evan Simon, Maddux Trujillo kick (Drive: 3 plays, 94 yards, 0:59; Temple 24–21.)

Fourth quarter

- (11:57) TEM – Daniel Evert 16-yard pass from Evan Simon, Maddux Trujillo kick (Drive: 9 plays, 82 yards, 5:01; Temple 31–21.)
- (6:02) TEM – Peter Clarke 2-yard pass from Evan Simon, Maddux Trujillo kick (Drive: 7 plays, 36 yards, 4:10; Temple 38–21.)
- (3:55) USU – Jack Hestera 28-yard pass from Spencer Petras, Kyrese White pass (Drive: 4 plays, 75 yards, 2:07; Temple 35–29.)
- (3:22) TEM – Evan Simon 1-yard run, Maddux Trujillo kick (Drive: 4 plays, 26 yards, 0:26; Temple 45–29.)

Statistics	USU	TEM
First downs	26	20
Total yards	479	451
Rushing yards	186	180
Passing yards	293	271
Turnovers	1	0
Time of possession	29:02	30:58

Team	Category	Player	Statistics
Utah State	Passing	Spencer Petras	26/44, 293 yards, 2 TD, INT
Utah State	Rushing	Rahsul Faison	27 carries, 148 yards, TD
Utah State	Receiving	Jalen Royals	10 receptions, 112 yards, TD
Temple	Passing	Evan Simon	17/27, 271 yards, 5 TD
Temple	Rushing	Evan Simon	11 carries, 49 yards, TD
Temple	Receiving	Dante Wright	3 receptions, 116 yards, TD

=== at No. 21 Boise State ===
Utah State Aggies at No. 21 Boise State Broncos – Game summary

Quarter	1	2	3	4	Total
Aggies	3	14	7	6	30
No. 21 Broncos	14	35	6	7	62

at Albertsons Stadium, Boise, Idaho

- Date: October 5
- Game time: 6:00 p.m. MDT
- Game weather: Sunny, 70 °F (21 °C)
- Game attendance: 37,210
- Referee: Michael Cuttone
- TV announcers (FS2): Eric Collins (play-by-play) and Spencer Tillman (analyst)

Game information

First quarter

- (13:01) BSU – Ashton Jeanty 63-yard run, Jonah Dalmas kick (Drive: 1 play, 63 yards, 0:11; Boise State 7–0)
- (7:07) USU – Tanner Cragun 36-yard field goal (Drive: 5 plays, 25 yards, 1:41; Boise State 7–3)
- (4:08) BSU – Cam Camper 6-yard pass from Maddux Madsen, Jonah Dalmas kick (Drive: 7 plays, 75 yards, 2:59; Boise State 14–3)

Second quarter

- (14:30) USU – Jalen Royals 59-yard pass from Spencer Petras, Tanner Cragun kick (Drive: 7 plays, 80 yards, 2:00; Boise State 14–10)
- (14:18) BSU – Ashton Jeanty 75-yard run, Jonah Dalmas kick (Drive: 1 play, 75 yards, 0:12; Boise State 21–10)
- (9:34) BSU – Austin Bolt 3-yard pass from Maddux Madsen, Jonah Dalmas kick (Drive: 8 plays, 85 yards, 3:27; Boise State 28–10)
- (6:04) BSU – Ashton Jeanty 6-yard run, Jonah Dalmas kick (Drive: 5 plays, 46 yards, 2:29; Boise State 35–10)
- (5:29) USU – Jalen Royals 75-yard pass from Spencer Petras, Tanner Cragun kick (Drive: 2 plays, 75 yards, 0:35; Boise State 35–17)
- (5:17) BSU – Dylan Riley 96-yard kickoff return, Jonah Dalmas kick (Boise State 42–17)
- (0:29) BSU – Austin Bolt 4-yard pass from Maddux Madsen, Jonah Dalmas kick (Drive: 9 plays, 86 yards, 1:33; Boise State 49–17)

Third quarter

- (9:58) BSU – Jonah Dalmas 48-yard field goal (Drive: 10 plays, 34 yards, 5:02; Boise State 52–17)
- (5:45) BSU – Jonah Dalmas 42-yard field goal (Drive: 7 plays, 43 yards, 3:04; Boise State 55–17)
- (2:09) USU – Otto Tia 6-yard pass from Spencer Petras, Tanner Cragun kick (Drive: 10 plays, 77 yards, 3:29; Boise State 55–24)

Fourth quarter

- (14:06) USU – Rahsul Faison 8-yard run, two-point pass failed (Drive: 6 plays, 43 yards, 1:33; Boise State 55–30)
- (11:08) BSU – Jambres Dubar 2-yard run, Jonah Dalmas kick (Drive: 6 plays, 24 yards, 2:53; Boise State 62–30)

Statistics	USU	BSU
First downs	21	27
Total yards	507	599
Rushing yards	135	296
Passing yards	372	303
Turnovers	1	1
Time of possession	25:34	34:26

Team	Category	Player	Statistics
Utah State	Passing	Spencer Petras	27/41, 372 yards, 3 TD
Utah State	Rushing	Rahsul Faison	26 carries, 109 yards, TD
Utah State	Receiving	Jalen Royals	9 receptions, 211 yards, 2 TD
Boise State	Passing	Maddux Madsen	21/25, 256 yards, 3 TD
Boise State	Rushing	Ashton Jeanty	13 carries, 186 yards, 3 TD
Boise State	Receiving	Chase Penry	4 receptions, 74 yards

=== UNLV ===
UNLV Rebels at Utah State Aggies – Game summary

Quarter	1	2	3	4	Total
Rebels	14	27	6	3	50
Aggies	7	0	14	13	34

at Maverik Stadium, Logan, Utah

- Date: October 11
- Game time: 7:00 p.m. MST
- Game weather: Sunny, 54 °F (12 °C)
- Game attendance: 20,295
- Referee: Cal McNeill
- TV announcers (CBSSN): Carter Blackburn (play-by-play) and Randy Cross (analyst)

Game information

First quarter

- (13:50) UNLV – Kylin James 5-yard run, Caden Chittenden kick (Drive: 4 plays, 75 yards, 1:10; UNLV 7–0)
- (5:40) UNLV – Ricky White III 18-yard pass from Hajj-Malik Williams, Caden Chittenden kick (Drive: 7 plays, 49 yards, 2:19; UNLV 14–0)
- (1:11) USU – Rahsul Faison 20-yard run, Tanner Cragun kick (Drive: 11 plays, 79 yards, 4:22; UNLV 14–7)

Second quarter

- (13:35) UNLV – Caden Chittenden 33-yard field goal (Drive: 8 plays, 60 yards, 2:37; UNLV 17–7)
- (11:56) UNLV – Casey Cain 18-yard pass from Hajj-Malik Williams, Caden Chittenden kick (Drive: 4 plays, 37 yards, 1:33; UNLV 24–7)
- (9:24) UNLV – Kylin James 22-yard run, Caden Chittenden kick (Drive: 3 plays, 37 yards, 1:25; UNLV 31–7)
- (3:37) UNLV – Caden Chittenden 46-yard field goal (Drive: 5 plays, 36 yards, 2:42; UNLV 34–7)
- (1:53) UNLV – Ricky White III 31-yard pass from Hajj-Malik Williams, Caden Chittenden kick (Drive: 3 plays, 31 yards, 1:04; UNLV 41–7)

Third quarter

- (12:09) USU – Jack Hestera 24-yard pass from Spencer Petras, Tanner Cragun kick (Drive: 8 plays, 66 yards, 2:44; UNLV 41–14)
- (10:26) UNLV – Jai'Den Thomas 29-yard run (Drive: 4 plays, 61 yards, 1:37; UNLV 47–14)
- (7:10) USU – Jalen Royals 13-yard pass from Spencer Petras, Tanner Cragun kick (Drive: 9 plays, 75 yards, 3:17; UNLV 47–21)

Fourth quarter

- (11:36) USU – Broc Lane 6-yard pass from Spencer Petras, Tanner Cragun kick (Drive: 8 plays, 67 yards, 2:56; UNLV 47–28)
- (3:31) UNLV – Andre Meono 36-yard field goal (Drive: 6 plays, 64 yards, 3:23; UNLV 50–28)
- (1:18) USU – Herschel Turner 3-yard run (Drive: 11 plays, 75 yards, 2:13; UNLV 50–34)

Statistics	UNLV	USU
First downs	25	32
Total yards	546	584
Rushing yards	313	123
Passing yards	233	461
Turnovers	0	4
Time of possession	31:02	28:58

Team	Category	Player	Statistics
UNLV	Passing	Hajj-Malik Williams	13/20, 233 yards, 3 TD
UNLV	Rushing	Jai'Den Thomas	17 carries, 139 yards, TD
UNLV	Receiving	Ricky White III	7 receptions, 138 yards, 2 TD
Utah State	Passing	Spencer Petras	41/59, 461 yards, 3 TD, 3 INT
Utah State	Rushing	Rahsul Faison	15 carries, 83 yards, TD
Utah State	Receiving	Jalen Royals	10 receptions, 155 yards, TD

=== New Mexico ===
Game Seven – New Mexico Lobos at Utah State Aggies – Game summary

Quarter	1	2	3	4	Total
Lobos	0	15	14	21	50
Aggies	14	10	14	7	45

at Maverik Stadium, Logan, Utah

- Date: October 19
- Game time: 2:00 p.m. MDT
- Game weather: Sunny, 60 °F (16 °C)
- Game attendance: 14,584
- Referee: Nolan Dumas
- TV announcers (TruTV): Ari Wolfe (play-by-play) and Darius Walker (analyst)

Game information

First quarter

- USU – Spencer Petras 2-yard run (Tanner Cragun kick), 8:18. Aggies 7–0. Drive: 14 plays, 73 yards, 5:26.
- USU – Rahsul Faison 6-yard run (Tanner Cragun kick), 3:02. Aggies 14–0. Drive: 7 plays, 58 yards, 3:04.

Second quarter

- USU – Tanner Cragun 38-yard field goal, 14:55. Aggies 17–0. Drive: 6 plays, 33 yards, 1:45.
- UNM – Javen Jacobs 21-yard pass from Devon Dampier (Trace Bruckler run), 12:16. Aggies 17–8. Drive: 3 plays, 21 yards, 0:44.
- UNM – Ryan Davis 14-yard pass from Devon Dampier (Luke Drzewiecki kick), 5:12. Aggies 17–15. Drive: 10 plays, 90 yards, 4:18.
- USU – Otto Tia 4-yard pass from Spencer Petras (Tanner Cragun kick), 0:32. Aggies 24–15. Drive: 16 plays, 74 yards, 4:33.

Third quarter

- USU – Rahsul Faison 9-yard run (Tanner Cragun kick), 14:04. Aggies 31–15. Drive: 3 plays, 75 yards, 0:56.
- UNM – Devon Dampier 33-yard run (Trace Bruckler run), 11:57. Aggies 31–23. Drive: 4 plays, 75 yards, 2:08.
- USU – Jalen Royals 13-yard pass from Spencer Petras (Tanner Cragun kick), 10:20. Aggies 38–23. Drive: 3 plays, 19 yards, 0:26.
- UNM – Javen Jacobs 15-yard run (run failed), 7:03. Aggies 38–29. Drive: 8 plays, 80 yards, 3:12.

Fourth quarter

- UNM – Eli Sanders 20-yard run (Luke Drzewiecki kick), 10:18. Aggies 38–36. Drive: 7 plays, 51 yards, 3:14.
- USU – Herschel Turner 43-yard run (Tanner Cragun kick), 7:43. Aggies 45–36. Drive: 6 plays, 75 yards, 2:35.
- UNM – Devon Dampier 5-yard run (Luke Drzewiecki kick), 3:53. Aggies 45–43. Drive: 11 plays, 75 yards, 3:50.
- UNM – Eli Sanders 12-yard run (Luke Drzewiecki kick), 1:13. Lobos 50–45. Drive: 4 plays, 34 yards, 1:07.

Statistics	UNM	USU
First downs	28	23
Total yards	552	503
Rushing yards	280	143
Passing yards	272	360
Turnovers	4	2
Time of possession	31:06	28:54

Team	Category	Player	Statistics
New Mexico	Passing	Devon Dampier	17/27, 272 yards, 2 TD, 3 INT
New Mexico	Rushing	Devon Dampier	15 rushes, 105 yards, 2 TD
New Mexico	Receiving	Luke Wysong	10 receptions, 156 yards
Utah State	Passing	Spencer Petras	32/47, 360 yards, 2 TD, INT
Utah State	Rushing	Rahsul Faison	24 rushes, 79 yards, 2 TD
Utah State	Receiving	Jalen Royals	11 receptions, 188 yards, TD

=== at Wyoming ===
Utah State Aggies at Wyoming Cowboys – Game summary

Quarter	1	2	3	4	Total
Aggies	7	10	0	10	27
Cowboys	3	7	6	9	25

at War Memorial Stadium, Laramie, Wyoming

- Date: October 26
- Game time: 5:00 p.m. MDT
- Game weather: Sunny, 65 °F (18 °C)
- Game attendance: 17,724
- Referee: Cal McNeill
- TV announcers (CBSSN): John Sadak (play-by-play) and Luke Kuechly (analyst)

Game information

First quarter

- USU (12:27) – Otto Tia 36-yard pass from Spencer Petras (Tanner Cragun kick); 7 plays, 75 yards, 2:33 (USU 7–0)
- WYO (5:19) – John Hoyland 43-yard field goal; 8 plays, 55 yards, 3:25 (USU 7–3)

Second quarter

- WYO (11:19) – Sam Scott 11-yard run (John Hoyland kick); 10 plays, 70 yards, 5:05 (WYO 10–7)
- USU (1:19) – Tanner Cragun 39-yard field goal; 12 plays, 65 yards, 4:30 (Tied 10–10)
- USU (0:19) – Rahsul Faison 8-yard run (Tanner Cragun kick); 2 plays, 44 yards, 0:16 (USU 17–10)

Third quarter

- WYO (9:30) – John Hoyland 27-yard field goal; 12 plays, 66 yards, 5:30 (USU 17–13)
- WYO (3:08) – John Hoyland 23-yard field goal; 12 plays, 69 yards, 5:06 (USU 17–16)

Fourth quarter

- WYO (13:36) – Tyler King 54-yard run (2-point conversion failed); 1 play, 54 yards, 0:09 (WYO 22–17)
- USU (11:58) – Josh Sterzer 10-yard pass from Spencer Petras (Tanner Cragun kick); 5 plays, 75 yards, 1:38 (USU 24–22)
- WYO (1:57) – John Hoyland 31-yard field goal; 10 plays, 66 yards, 5:21 (WYO 25–24)
- USU (0:00) – Tanner Cragun 40-yard field goal; 12 plays, 53 yards, 1:57 (USU 27–25)

Statistics	USU	WYO
First downs	23	26
Total yards	378	470
Rushing yards	148	276
Passing yards	230	194
Turnovers	0	2
Time of possession	25:10	34:50

Team	Category	Player	Statistics
Utah State	Passing	Spencer Petras	25/39, 194 yards, 2 TD
Utah State	Rushing	Rahsul Faison	23 carries, 131 yards, TD
Utah State	Receiving	Otto Tia	6 receptions, 76 yards, TD
Wyoming	Passing	Kaden Anderson	15/24, 182 yards
Wyoming	Rushing	Sam Scott	11 carries, 115 yards, TD
Wyoming	Receiving	Chris Durr	9 receptions, 83 yards

=== at No. 21 Washington State ===
Utah State Aggies at No. 21 Washington State Cougars – Game summary

Quarter	1	2	3	4	Total
Aggies	7	0	7	14	28
No. 21 Cougars	7	14	14	14	49

at Martin Stadium, Pullman, Washington

- Date: November 9
- Game time: 8:30 p.m. MDT
- Game weather: Clear, 45 °F (7 °C)
- Game attendance: 20,011
- Referee: John Love
- TV announcers (The CW): Ted Robinson (play-by-play), Ryan Leaf (analyst) and Nigel Burton (sideline)

Game information

First quarter

- (10:24) WSU – Kyle Williams 17-yard pass from John Mateer, Dean Janikowski kick (Drive: 9 plays, 65 yards, 3:13; Washington State 7–0)
- (5:01) USU – Jack Hestera 3-yard pass from Spencer Petras, Tanner Cragun kick (Drive: 11 plays, 75 yards, 5:23; Tied 7–7)

Second quarter

- (14:57) WSU – Wayshawn Parker 1-yard run, Dean Janikowski kick (Drive: 12 plays, 85 yards, 4:59; Washington State 14–7)
- (7:17) WSU – Kyle Williams 14-yard pass from John Mateer, Dean Janikowski kick (Drive: 10 plays, 75 yards, 5:26; Washington State 21–7)

Third quarter

- (14:48) WSU – Wayshawn Parker 75-yard run, Dean Janikowski kick (Drive: 1 play, 75 yards, 0:12; Washington State 28–7)
- (5:52) WSU – John Mateer 1-yard run, Dean Janikowski kick (Drive: 6 plays, 65 yards, 3:34; Washington State 35–7)
- (2:02) USU – Bryson Barnes 2-yard run, Tanner Cragun kick (Drive: 11 plays, 75 yards, 3:50; Washington State 35–14)

Fourth quarter

- (14:49) WSU – Kyle Williams 5-yard pass from John Mateer, Dean Janikowski kick (Drive: 8 plays, 80 yards, 2:07; Washington State 42–14)
- (8:39) USU – Kyrese White 12-yard pass from Spencer Petras, Tanner Cragun kick (Drive: 13 plays, 70 yards, 6:01; Washington State 42–21)
- (1:05) WSU – Cooper Mathers 3-yard pass from John Mateer, Dean Janikowski kick (Drive: 11 plays, 53 yards, 7:31; Washington State 49–21)
- (0:41) USU – Derrick Jameson 72-yard run, Tanner Cragun kick (Drive: 3 plays, 75 yards, 0:24; Washington State 49–28)

Statistics	USU	WSU
First downs	21	28
Total yards	395	482
Rushing yards	187	303
Passing yards	208	179
Turnovers	2	0
Time of possession	27:15	32:45

Team	Category	Player	Statistics
Utah State	Passing	Spencer Petras	28/45, 208 yards, 2 TD, INT
Utah State	Rushing	Herschel Turner	16 carries, 85 yards
Utah State	Receiving	Grant Page	7 receptions, 54 yards
Washington State	Passing	John Mateer	18/24, 179 yards, 4 TD
Washington State	Rushing	Wayshawn Parker	11 carries, 149 yards, 2 TD
Washington State	Receiving	Kyle Williams	5 receptions, 55 yards, 3 TD

=== Hawaii ===
Game Ten – Hawaii Rainbow Warriors at Utah State Aggies – Game summary

Quarter	1	2	3	4	Total
Rainbow Warriors	0	3	0	7	10
Aggies	17	7	21	10	55

at Maverik Stadium, Logan, Utah

- Date: November 16
- Game time: 1:00 p.m. MST
- Game weather: Sunny
- Game attendance: 13,348
- Referee: Kenneth Ray
- TV announcers (SPEC PPV): Kanoa Leahey (play-by-play) and Rich Miano (analyst)

Game information

First quarter

- (13:27) USU – Otto Tia 41-yard pass from Spencer Petras, Tanner Cragun kick (Drive: 6 plays, 71 yards, 1:26; Utah State 7–0)
- (5:28) USU – Tanner Cragun 32-yard field goal (Drive: 7 plays, 38 yards, 2:41; Utah State 10–0)
- (1:06) USU – Will Monney 16-yard pass from Spencer Petras, Tanner Cragun kick (Drive: 5 plays, 61 yards, 1:20; Utah State 17–0)

Second quarter

- (8:54) USU – Josh Sterzer 2-yard pass from Bryson Barnes, Tanner Cragun kick (Drive: 14 plays, 95 yards, 5:21; Utah State 24–0)
- (3:35) HAW – Kansei Matsuzawa 40-yard field goal (Drive: 12 plays, 53 yards, 5:19; Utah State 24–3)

Third quarter

- (9:38) USU – Rahsul Faison 37-yard run, Tanner Cragun kick (Drive: 1 play, 37 yards, 0:09; Utah State 31–3)
- (6:18) USU – Rahsul Faison 37-yard run, Tanner Cragun kick (Drive: 3 plays, 66 yards, 1:13; Utah State 38–3)
- (0:57) USU – Josh Sterzer 2-yard pass from Bryson Barnes, Tanner Cragun kick (Drive: 7 plays, 79 yards, 2:32; Utah State 45–3)

Fourth quarter

- (8:35) USU – Derrick Jameson 21-yard run, Tanner Cragun kick (Drive: 4 plays, 41 yards, 2:32; Utah State 52–3)
- (5:42) HAW – Dekel Crowdus 44-yard pass from Micah Alejado, Kansei Matsuzawa kick (Drive: 6 plays, 75 yards, 2:53; Utah State 52–10)
- (1:13) USU – Tanner Cragun 37-yard field goal (Drive: 8 plays, 55 yards, 4:29; Utah State 55–10)

Statistics	HAW	USU
First downs	15	27
Total yards	309	580
Rushing yards	47	321
Passing yards	262	259
Turnovers	5	2
Time of possession	30:18	29:42

Team	Category	Player	Statistics
Hawaii	Passing	Brayden Schager	11/19, 124 yards, 3 INT
Hawaii	Rushing	Landon Sims	6 carries, 28 yards
Hawaii	Receiving	Nick Cenacle	6 receptions, 72 yards
Utah State	Passing	Spencer Petras	20/30, 255 yards, 2 TD, 2 INT
Utah State	Rushing	Rahsul Faison	20 carries, 191 yards, 2 TD
Utah State	Receiving	Otto Tia	6 receptions, 68 yards, TD

=== San Diego State ===
San Diego State Aztecs at Utah State Aggies – Game summary

Quarter	1	2	3	4	Total
Aztecs	3	10	0	7	20
Aggies	0	14	7	20	41

at Maverik Stadium, Logan, Utah

- Date: November 23
- Game time: 1:30 p.m. MDT
- Game weather: Sunny
- Game attendance: 12,583
- Referee: Patrick Foy
- TV announcers (CBSSN): Chris Lewis (play-by-play) and Taylor McHargue (analyst)

Game information

First quarter

- SDSU – Gabriel Plascencia 35-yard field goal, 0:00. Aztecs 3–0. Drive: 9 plays, 65 yards, 4:22.

Second quarter

- SDSU – Marquez Cooper 14-yard run (Gabriel Plascencia kick), 7:49. Aztecs 10–0. Drive: 6 plays, 46 yards, 2:26.
- SDSU – Gabriel Plascencia 30-yard field goal, 3:16. Aztecs 13–0. Drive: 7 plays, 21 yards, 3:16.
- USU – Bryson Barnes 19-yard run (Tanner Cragun kick), 1:53. Aztecs 13–7. Drive: 4 plays, 65 yards, 1:23.
- USU – Grant Page 9-yard pass from Bryson Barnes (Tanner Cragun kick), 0:16. Aggies 14–13. Drive: 8 plays, 65 yards, 1:17.

Third quarter

- USU – Josh Sterzer 10-yard pass from Bryson Barnes (Tanner Cragun kick), 10:58. Aggies 21–13. Drive: 8 plays, 75 yards, 4:02.

Fourth quarter

- USU – Grant Page 6-yard pass from Bryson Barnes (kick failed), 12:26. Aggies 27–13. Drive: 9 plays, 80 yards, 3:50.
- USU – Kyrese White 5-yard run (Tanner Cragun kick), 8:07. Aggies 34–13. Drive: 4 plays, 80 yards, 1:25.
- USU – Herschel Turner 1-yard run (Tanner Cragun kick), 3:08. Aggies 41–13. Drive: 6 plays, 41 yards, 3:10.
- SDSU – Mekhi Shaw 12-yard pass from Javance Tupou'ata-Johnson (Gabriel Plascencia kick), 0:32. Aggies 41–20. Drive: 11 plays, 75 yards, 2:36.

Statistics	SDSU	USU
First downs	23	25
Total yards	412	488
Rushing yards	188	322
Passing yards	224	166
Turnovers	0	1
Time of possession	30:28	29:32

Team	Category	Player	Statistics
San Diego State	Passing	Danny O'Neil	23/31, 199 yards
San Diego State	Rushing	Marquez Cooper	23 rushes, 118 yards, TD
San Diego State	Receiving	Louis Brown IV	7 receptions, 114 yards
Utah State	Passing	Bryson Barnes	13/15, 139 yards, 3 TD
Utah State	Rushing	Bryson Barnes	15 rushes, 193 yards, TD
Utah State	Receiving	Kyrese White	6 receptions, 67 yards

=== at Colorado State ===
Utah State Aggies (4–7) at Colorado State Rams (7–4) – Game summary

Quarter	1	2	3	4	Total
Aggies	13	3	14	7	37
Rams	0	13	0	29	42

at Canvas Stadium, Fort Collins, Colorado

- Date: November 29
- Game time: 1:30 p.m. MDT
- Game weather: Sunny, 42 °F (6 °C)
- Game attendance: 24,772
- Referee: Christian Watson
- TV announcers (FS1): Chris Vosters (play-by-play) and Sherdrick Bonner (analyst)

Game information

First quarter

- USU – Bryson Barnes 1-yard run (pass failed), 6:17. Aggies 6–0. Drive: 6 plays, 76 yards, 2:02.
- USU – Otto Tia 2-yard pass from Bryson Barnes (Tanner Cragun kick), 2:09. Aggies 13–0. Drive: 5 plays, 43 yards, 2:13.

Second quarter

- CSU – Jordan Noyes 33-yard field goal, 10:28. Aggies 13–3. Drive: 14 plays, 60 yards, 6:41.
- USU – Tanner Cragun 26-yard field goal, 7:55. Aggies 16–3. Drive: 7 plays, 66 yards, 2:33.
- CSU – Jordan Noyes 40-yard field goal, 1:44. Aggies 16–6. Drive: 13 plays, 56 yards, 6:06.
- CSU – Dane Olson 28-yard pass from Brayden Fowler-Nicolosi (Jordan Noyes kick), 0:19. Aggies 16–13. Drive: 7 plays, 54 yards, 0:46.

Third quarter

- USU – Otto Tia 14-yard pass from Bryson Barnes (Tanner Cragun kick), 1:07. Aggies 23–13. Drive: 15 plays, 79 yards, 5:59.
- USU – Jaiden Francois 40-yard interception return (Tanner Cragun kick), 0:49. Aggies 30–13.

Fourth quarter

- CSU – Vince Brown II 12-yard pass from Brayden Fowler-Nicolosi (Brayden Fowler-Nicolosi pass to Jamari Person), 13:30. Aggies 30–21. Drive: 6 plays, 75 yards, 2:19.
- CSU – Jordan Ross 22-yard pass from Brayden Fowler-Nicolosi (Jordan Noyes kick), 6:03. Aggies 30–28. Drive: 7 plays, 74 yards, 1:56.
- CSU – Brayden Fowler-Nicolosi 3-yard run (Jordan Noyes kick), 2:32. Rams 35–30. Drive: 3 plays, 19 yards, 1:25.
- CSU – Vince Brown II 26-yard pass from Brayden Fowler-Nicolosi (Jordan Noyes kick), 1:37. Rams 42–30. Drive: 4 plays, 34 yards, 0:19.
- USU – Otto Tia 2-yard pass from Bryson Barnes (Tanner Cragun kick), 0:14. Ram 42–37. Drive: 9 plays, 75 yards, 1:23.

Statistics	USU	CSU
First downs	24	22
Total yards	485	454
Rushing yards	296	84
Passing yards	189	370
Turnovers	3	1
Time of possession	28:17	31:43

Team	Category	Player	Statistics
Utah State	Passing	Bryson Barnes	17/29, 189 yards, 3 TD, 2 INT
Utah State	Rushing	Bryson Barnes	24 rushes, 185 yards, TD
Utah State	Receiving	Otto Tia	6 receptions, 81 yards, 3 TD
Colorado State	Passing	Brayden Fowler-Nicolosi	31/46, 370 yards, 4 TD, INT
Colorado State	Rushing	Avery Marrow	21 rushes, 80 yards
Colorado State	Receiving	Dane Olson	5 receptions, 140 yards, TD
