= 2024 Washington State Cougars football team =

American college football season

2024 Washington State Cougars football

Holiday Bowl, L 35–52 vs. Syracuse
- Conference: Pac-12 Conference
- Record: 8–5 (0–1 Pac-12)
- Head coach: Jake Dickert (4th season; regular season); Pete Kaligis (interim; bowl game)
- Offensive coordinator: Ben Arbuckle (2nd season)
- Offensive scheme: Air raid
- Defensive coordinator: Jeff Schmedding (2nd season; regular season)
- Base defense: 4–2–5
- Home stadium: Martin Stadium

2024 Pac-12 Conference football standings
	Conf.			Overall
Team	W		L	W		L
Oregon State	1	–	0	5	–	7
Washington State	0	–	1	8	–	5

The 2024 Washington State Cougars football team represented Washington State University in the Pac-12 Conference during the 2024 NCAA Division I FBS football season. Led by fourth-year head coach Jake Dickert, the Cougars played home games on campus at Martin Stadium in Pullman, Washington.

== Offseason ==
Prior to the 2023 Pac-12 Conference football season, 10 of the teams in the Pac-12 Conference announced that they intended to join other conferences, leaving Oregon State and Washington State as the only remaining conference members. Following several months of legal maneuvering over conference assets and liabilities, all schools reached a settlement in which Oregon State and Washington State retained control over the conference. The schools arranged a scheduling partnership with the Mountain West Conference to complete their football schedules.

=== Players drafted into the NFL ===
Round	Pick	NFL team	Player	Position
4	133	Kansas City Chiefs	Jaden Hicks	S
5	154	Los Angeles Rams	Brennan Jackson	DE
5	157	Carolina Panthers	Chau Smith-Wade	CB

== Schedule ==
Date	Time	Opponent	Rank	Site	TV	Result	Attendance
August 31	12:00 p.m.	Portland State*		Martin Stadium; Pullman, WA	The CW	W 70–30	20,089
September 7	7:00 p.m.	Texas Tech*		Martin Stadium; Pullman, WA	FOX	W 37–16	27,372
September 14	12:30 p.m.	vs. Washington*		Lumen Field; Seattle, WA (Apple Cup)	Peacock	W 24–19	57,567
September 20	7:00 p.m.	San Jose State*		Martin Stadium; Pullman, WA	The CW	W 54–52 ^{2OT}	24,808
September 28	7:00 p.m.	at No. 25 Boise State*		Albertsons Stadium; Boise, ID	FS1	L 24–45	37,711
October 12	4:00 p.m.	at Fresno State*		Valley Children's Stadium; Fresno, CA	FS1	W 25–17	41,031
October 19	12:30 p.m.	Hawaii*^{†}		Martin Stadium; Pullman, WA	The CW	W 42–10	25,112
October 26	7:30 p.m.	at San Diego State*		Snapdragon Stadium; San Diego, CA	CBSSN	W 29–26	26,937
November 9	7:30 p.m.	Utah State*	No. 21	Martin Stadium; Pullman, WA	The CW	W 49–28	20,011
November 16	6:30 p.m.	at New Mexico*	No. 18	University Stadium; Albuquerque, NM	FS1	L 35–38	14,067
November 23	4:00 p.m.	at Oregon State		Reser Stadium; Corvallis, OR	The CW	L 38–41	38,008
November 30	3:30 p.m.	Wyoming*		Martin Stadium; Pullman, WA	The CW	L 14–15	17,088
December 27	5:00 p.m.	vs. No. 21 Syracuse*		Snapdragon Stadium; San Diego, CA (Holiday Bowl)	FOX	L 35–52	23,920
*Non-conference game; ^{†}Homecoming; Rankings from AP Poll (and CFP Rankings, after November 5) - Released prior to game; All times are in Pacific time

== Game summaries ==
=== vs. Portland State (FCS) ===
Game One – Portland State Vikings (FCS) (0-0) vs Washington State Cougars (0-0) – Game summary

Quarter	1	2	3	4	Total
Vikings (FCS)	7	10	6	7	30
Cougars	22	27	14	7	70

at Martin Stadium • Pullman, WA

- Date: Saturday August 31, 2024
- Game time: 12:00 PM PST
- Game weather: Sunny
- Game attendance: 20,089
- TV announcers (The CW): Ted Robinson, Ryan Leaf, and Nigel Burton

Game information

First quarter

- PSU – Dante Chachere 5-yard run (Mathias Uribe kick), 12:17. Vikings 7–0. Drive: 5 plays, 65 yards, 1:44.
- WSU – Kris Hutson 30-yard pass from John Mateer (Dean Janikowski kick), 10:06. Cougars 7–7. Drive: 8 plays, 75 yards, 2:11.
- WSU – Tre Shackelford 39-yard pass from John Mateer (Dean Janikowski kick), 4:49. Cougars 14–7. Drive: 6 plays, 75 yards, 3:04.
- WSU – Kyle Williams 58-yard pass from John Mateer (Billy Riviere III run for two-point conversion), 3:07. Cougars 22–7. Drive: 1 plays, 58 yards, 0:04.

Second quarter

- PSU – Matias Uribe 43-yard field goal, 14:55. Cougars 22–10. Drive: 8 plays, 49 yards, 3:12.
- WSU – Wayshawn Parker 54-yard run (Dean Janikowski kick), 13:39. Cougars 29–10. Drive: 4 plays, 75 yards, 1:16.
- WSU – Wayshawn Parker 4-yard pass from John Mateer (Dean Janikowski kick), 10:28. Cougars 36–10. Drive: 4 plays, 68 yards, 1:19.
- WSU – Stephen Hall 100-yard interception return (pass failed), 2:36. Cougars 42–10. Drive: 14 plays, 71 yards, 7:52.
- WSU – John Mateer 40-yard run (Dean Janikowski kick), 1:30. Cougars 49–10. Drive: 2 plays, 47 yards, 0:12.
- PSU – Branden Alvarez 10-yard pass from William Haskell (Matias Uribe kick), 0:08. Cougars 49–17. Drive: 8 plays, 75 yards, 1:22.

Third quarter

- WSU – Djouvensky Schlenbaker 11-yard run (Dean Janikowski kick), 12:17. Cougars 56–17. Drive: 2 plays, 70 yards, 0:28.
- WSU – Kyle Williams 59-yard pass from John Mateer (Dean Janikowski kick), 9:47. Cougars 63–17. Drive: 2 plays, 64 yards, 0:46.
- PSU – Eric Denham 40-yard pass from Dante Chachere (run failed), 7:53. Cougars 63–23. Drive: 4 plays, 75 yards, 1:57.

Fourth quarter

- WSU – Trey Leckner 33-yard pass from Zevi Eckhaus (Dean Janikowski kick), 13:32. Cougars 70–23. Drive: 11 plays, 92 yards, 4:31.
- PSU – Dante Chachere 4-yard run (Matias Uribe kick), 4:35. Cougars 70–30. Drive: 14 plays, 75 yards, 8:57.

Statistics	PSU	WSU
First downs	21	21
Total yards	449	637
Rushing yards	215	224
Passing yards	234	413
Passing: Comp–Att–Int	20–35–1	17–24–0
Time of possession	40:26	19:34

Team	Category	Player	Statistics
Portland State	Passing	Dante Chachere	14/25, 175 yards, TD, INT
Portland State	Rushing	Delon Thompson	15 carries, 96 yards
Portland State	Receiving	Tanner Beaman	3 receptions, 42 yards
Washington State	Passing	John Mateer	11/17, 352 yards, 5 TD
Washington State	Rushing	Wayshawn Parker	8 carries, 96 yards, TD
Washington State	Receiving	Kyle Williams	4 receptions, 141 yards, 2 TD

=== vs Texas Tech ===
Texas Tech Red Raiders (1–0) vs Washington State Cougars (1–0) – Game summary

Quarter	1	2	3	4	Total
Red Raiders	3	7	0	6	16
Cougars	7	20	7	3	37

at Martin Stadium • Pullman, WA

- Date: September 7, 2024
- Game time: 7:00 PM PST
- Game weather: Sunny
- Game attendance: 27,372
- Referee: Chris Wiggins
- TV announcers (Fox): Tim Brando, Devin Gardner, and Josh Sims

Game information

First quarter

- WSU – John Mateer 4-yard run (Dean Janikowski kick), 10:03. Cougars 7–0. Drive: 7 plays, 40 yards, 3:20.
- TTU – Gino Garcia 37-yard field goal, 3:31. Cougars 7–3. Drive: 11 plays, 51 yards, 3:37.

Second quarter

- WSU – Wayshawn Parker 43-yard run (Dean Janikowski kick), 8:09. Cougars 14–3. Drive: 1 play, 43 yards, 0:09.
- WSU – Djouvensky Schlenbaker 2-yard run (Dean Janikowski kick), 7:53. Cougars 21–3. Drive: 1 play, 2 yards, 0:01.
- TTU – Johncarlos Miller III 20-yard pass from Coy Eakin (Gino Garcia kick), 5:33. Cougars 21–10. Drive: 6 plays, 75 yards, 2:20.
- WSU – Kyle Williams 21-yard pass from John Mateer (kick failed), 0:25. Cougars 27–10. Drive: 3 plays, 38 yards, 0:31.

Third quarter

- WSU – Djouvensky Schlenbaker 1-yard run (Dean Janikowski kick), 3:13. Cougars 34–10. Drive: 6 plays, 51 yards, 2:23.

Fourth quarter

- TTU – Cameron Dickey 12-yard pass from Behren Morton (pass failed), 9:21. Cougars 34–16. Drive: 7 plays, 61 yards, 1:53.
- WSU – Dean Janikowski 25-yard field goal, 5:57. Cougars 37–16. Drive: 6 plays, 68 yards, 2:06.

Statistics	TTU	WSU
First downs	24	18
Total yards	491	416
Rushing yards	148	301
Passing yards	343	115
Passing: Comp–Att–Int	35–60–2	9–19–1
Time of possession	29:55	30:05

Team	Category	Player	Statistics
Texas Tech	Passing	Behren Morton	34/58, 323 yards, TD, 2 INT
Texas Tech	Rushing	Cameran Brown	5 carries, 70 yards
Texas Tech	Receiving	Josh Kelly	9 receptions, 95 yards
Washington State	Passing	John Mateer	9/19, 115 yards, TD, INT
Washington State	Rushing	John Mateer	21 carries, 197 yards, TD
Washington State	Receiving	Josh Meredith	2 receptions, 54 yards

=== vs Washington (Apple Cup) ===
Washington State Cougars (2–0) vs Washington Huskies (2–0) – Game summary

Quarter	1	2	3	4	Total
Cougars	10	7	7	0	24
Huskies	7	6	6	0	19

at Lumen Field • Seattle, WA

- Date: September 14, 2024
- Game time: 12:30 PM PST
- Game weather: Cloudy, 62 °F (17 °C)
- Game attendance: 57,567
- Referee: Stephen Baron
- TV announcers (Peacock): Paul Burmeister, Colt McCoy, and Zora Stephenson

Game information

First quarter

- WSU – Dean Janikowski 44-yard field goal, 8:58. Cougars 3–0. Drive: 4 plays, 3 yards, 0:51.
- UW – Giles Jackson 31-yard pass from Will Rogers (Grady Gross kick), 7:16. Huskies 7–3. Drive: 4 plays, 75 yards, 1:42.
- WSU – John Mateer 23-yard run (Dean Janikowski kick), 4:16. Cougars 10–7. Drive: 6 plays, 72 yards, 2:51.

Second quarter

- UW – Grady Gross 44-yard field goal, 14:56. Huskies 10–10. Drive: 10 plays, 48 yards, 4:20.
- UW – Grady Gross 42-yard field goal, 9:10. Huskies 13–10. Drive: 7 plays, 56 yards, 3:19.
- WSU – John Mateer 25-yard run (Dean Janikowski kick), 0:21. Cougars 17–13. Drive: 6 plays, 91 yards, 1:41.

Third quarter

- UW – Grady Gross 24-yard field goal, 9:47. Cougars 17–16. Drive: 11 plays, 67 yards, 5:06.
- WSU – Josh Meredith 16-yard pass from John Mateer (Dean Janikowski kick), 5:54. Cougars 24–16. Drive: 6 plays, 77 yards, 3:45.
- UW – Grady Gross 43-yard field goal, 0:00. Cougars 24–19. Drive: 12 plays, 50 yards, 5:54.

Fourth quarter

Statistics	WSU	WASH
First downs	25	21
Total yards	381	452
Rushing yards	136	126
Passing yards	245	326
Passing: Comp–Att–Int	17–34–1	26–35–0
Time of possession	27:55	32:05

Team	Category	Player	Statistics
Washington State	Passing	John Mateer	17/34, 245 yards, TD, INT
Washington State	Rushing	John Mateer	16 carries, 62 yards, 2 TD
Washington State	Receiving	Josh Meredith	7 receptions, 11 yards, TD
Washington	Passing	Will Rogers	23/31, 314 yards, TD
Washington	Rushing	Jonah Coleman	14 carries, 75 yards
Washington	Receiving	Giles Jackson	8 receptions, 162 yards, TD

=== vs San Jose State ===
San Jose State Spartans (3–0) vs Washington State Cougars (3–0) – Game summary

Quarter	1	2	3	4	OT	2OT	Total
Spartans	10	7	21	8	0	6	52
Cougars	7	17	0	22	0	8	54

at Martin Stadium • Pullman, WA

- Date: September 20, 2024
- Game time: 7:00 p.m.
- Game weather: Sunny
- Game attendance: 24,808
- Referee: John Love
- TV announcers (The CW): J. B. Long, Michael Bumpus, and Camryn Irwin

Game information

First quarter

- (9:00) WSU – John Mateer 1-yard run, Dean Janikowski kick (Drive: 13 plays, 76 yards, 5:56; Washington State 7–0)
- (8:19) SJSU – Floyd Chalk IV 66-yard run, Kyler Halvorsen kick (Drive: 2 plays, 75 yards, 0:41; Tied 7–7)
- (2:57) SJSU – Kyler Halvorsen 19-yard field goal (Drive: 11 plays, 48 yards, 5:22; San Jose State 10–7)

Second quarter

- (11:31) WSU – Cooper Mathers 4-yard pass from John Mateer, Dean Janikowski kick (Drive: 14 plays, 64 yards, 6:18; Washington State 14–10)
- (5:41) WSU – Cooper Mathers 8-yard pass from John Mateer, Dean Janikowski kick (Drive: 9 plays, 85 yards, 3:57; Washington State 21–10)
- (1:40) SJSU – Jacob Stewart 4-yard pass from Emmett Brown, Kyler Halvorsen kick (Drive: 9 plays, 76 yards, 2:54; Washington State 21–17)
- (0:02) WSU – Dean Janikowski 36-yard field goal (Drive: 12 plays, 56 yards, 1:38; Washington State 24–17)

Third quarter

- (13:02) SJSU – Nick Nash 19-yard pass from Emmett Brown, Kyler Halvorsen kick (Drive: 5 plays, 75 yards, 1:58; Tied 24–24)
- (5:43) SJSU – Emmett Brown 1-yard run, Kyler Halvorsen kick (Drive: 7 plays, 20 yards, 2:54; San Jose State 31–24)
- (0:48) SJSU – Floyd Chalk IV 18-yard run, Kyler Halvorsen kick (Drive: 7 plays, 75 yards, 4:13; San Jose State 38–24)

Fourth quarter

- (13:41) WSU – Kyle Williams 13-yard pass from John Mateer, Dean Janikowski kick (Drive: 6 plays, 65 yards, 2:07; San Jose State 38–31)
- (6:11) WSU – Josh Meredith 36-yard pass from John Mateer, Dean Janikowski kick failed (Drive: 5 plays, 64 yards, 1:23; San Jose State 38–37)
- (4:56) WSU – Dylan Paine 1-yard run, John Mateer pass failed (Drive: 2 plays, 32 yards, 0:23; Washington State 43–38)
- (0:26) SJSU – TreyShun Hurry 20-yard pass from Emmett Brown, Nick Nash pass (Drive: 8 plays, 72 yards, 1:26; San Jose State 46–43)
- (0:00) WSU – Dean Janikowski 52-yard field goal (Drive: 4 plays, 40 yards, 0:26; Tied 46–46)

First overtime

No scoring

Second overtime

- (0:00) WSU – Dylan Paine 7-yard run, John Mateer pass (Drive: 5 plays, 25 yards, 15:00; Washington State 54–46)
- (0:00) SJSU – Nick Nash 4-yard pass from Emmett Brown, Emmett Brown pass failed (Drive: 5 plays, 25 yards, 15:00; Washington State 54–52)

Statistics	SJSU	WSU
First downs	23	31
Total yards	491	627
Rushing yards	116	237
Passing yards	375	390
Passing: Comp–Att–Int	35–54–2	26–46–2
Time of possession	28:07	31:53

Team	Category	Player	Statistics
San Jose State	Passing	Emmett Brown	35/54, 375 yards, 4 TD, 2 INT
San Jose State	Rushing	Floyd Chalk IV	11 carries, 94 yards, 2 TD
San Jose State	Receiving	Nick Nash	16 receptions, 152 yards, 2 TD
Washington State	Passing	John Mateer	26/46, 390 yards, 4 TD, 2 INT
Washington State	Rushing	John Mateer	18 carries, 111 yards, TD
Washington State	Receiving	Kyle Williams	8 receptions, 138 yards, TD

=== at No. 25 Boise State ===
Washington State Cougars (4–0) at No. 25 Boise State Broncos (2–1) – Game summary

Quarter	1	2	3	4	Total
Cougars	7	3	0	14	24
No. 25 Broncos	7	10	7	21	45

at Albertsons Stadium • Boise, ID

- Date: September 28, 2024
- Game time: 7:00 p.m.
- Game weather: Clear • Temperature: 84 °F (29 °C) • Wind: W 4 miles per hour (6.4 km/h)
- Game attendance: 37,711
- Referee: Christian Watson
- TV announcers (FS1): Dan Hellie and Petros Papadakis

Game information

First quarter

- (12:52) BSU - Ashton Jeanty 64-yard run, Jonah Dalmas kick (Drive: 5 plays, 75 yards, 2:08; Boise State 7-0)
- (11:23) WSU - Cooper Mathers 14-yard pass from John Mateer, Dean Janikowski kick (Drive: 3 plays, 65 yards, 1:29; Tied 7-7)

Second quarter

- (14:11) BSU - Jonah Dalmas 29-yard field goal (Drive: 10 plays, 60 yards, 4:55; Boise State 10-7)
- (8:27) WSU - Dean Janikowski 35-yard field goal (Drive: 6 plays, 46 yards, 2:37; Tied 10-10)
- (3:19) BSU - Ashton Jeanty 14-yard run, Jonah Dalmas kick (Drive: 9 plays, 82 yards, 5:01; Boise State 17-10)

Third quarter

- (1:22) BSU - Matt Lauter 22-yard pass from Maddux Madsen, Jonah Dalmas kick (Drive: 3 plays, 27 yards, 0:58; Boise State 24-10)

Fourth quarter

- (14:52) WSU - Kyle Williams 33-yard pass from John Mateer, Dean Janikowski kick (Drive: 6 plays, 75 yards, 1:30; Boise State 24-17)
- (13:17) BSU - Ashton Jeanty 59-yard run, Jonah Dalmas kick (Drive: 4 plays, 75 yards, 1:35; Boise State 31-17)
- (9:38) BSU - Ashton Jeanty 2-yard run, Jonah Dalmas kick (Drive: 5 plays, 44 yards, 2:10; Boise State 38-17)
- (4:16) BSU - Matt Lauter 34-yard pass from Maddux Madsen, Jonah Dalmas kick (Drive: 6 plays, 56 yards, 3:49; Boise State 45-17)
- (0:19) WSU - Leo Pulalasi 1-yard run, Dean Janikowski (Drive: 11 plays, 75 yards, 3:57; Boise State 45-24)

Statistics	WSU	BSU
First downs	21	21
Total yards	416	460
Rushing yards	89	276
Passing yards	327	184
Passing: Comp–Att–Int	26–37–1	12–21–1
Time of possession	33:28	26:32

Team	Category	Player	Statistics
Washington State	Passing	John Mateer	26/37, 327 yards, 2 TD, INT
Washington State	Rushing	Wayshawn Parker	11 carries, 35 yards
Washington State	Receiving	Kyle Williams	9 receptions, 142 yards, TD
Boise State	Passing	Maddux Madsen	12/21, 184 yards, 2 TD, INT
Boise State	Rushing	Ashton Jeanty	26 carries, 259 yards, 4 TD
Boise State	Receiving	Matt Lauter	4 receptions, 96 yards, 2 TD

=== at Fresno State ===
Washington State Cougars (4–1) at Fresno State Bulldogs (3–2) – Game summary

Quarter	1	2	3	4	Total
Cougars	13	0	3	9	25
Bulldogs	7	0	7	3	17

at Valley Children's Stadium • Fresno, CA

- Date: October 12, 2024
- Game time: 4:00 p.m.
- Game weather: Sunny
- Game attendance: 41,031
- Referee: Christian Watson
- TV announcers (FS1): Trent Rush and Petros Papadakis

Game information

First quarter

- (9:13) WSU – John Mateer 1-yard run, Two–point pass failed (Drive: 13 plays, 75 yards, 5:47; Washington State 6–0)
- (4:23) FRES – Josiah Freeman 34-yard pass from Mikey Keene, Dylan Lynch kick (Drive: 10 plays, 77 yards, 4:44; Fresno State 7–6)
- (0:34) WSU – Kris Hutson 2-yard run, Dean Janikowski kick (Drive: 8 plays, 75 yards, 3:49; Washington State 13–7)

Second quarter

No scoring plays

Third quarter

- (7:26) FRES – Elijah Gilliam 6-yard run, Dylan Lynch kick (Drive: 4 plays, 33 yards, 2:20; Fresno State 14–13)
- (5:16) WSU – Dean Janikowski 34-yard field goal (Drive: 13 plays, 58 yards, 2:10; Washington State 16–14)

Fourth quarter

- (10:13) FRES – Dylan Lynch 27-yard field goal (Drive: 13 plays, 66 yards, 6:40; Fresno State 17–16)
- (6:52) WSU – Ethan O'Connor 60-yard interception return, Two–run failed (Washington State 22–17)
- (1:46) WSU – Dean Janikowski 23-yard field goal (Drive: 8 plays, 40 yards, 2:58; Washington State 25–17)

Statistics	WSU	FRES
First downs	23	22
Total yards	295	338
Rushing yards	123	118
Passing yards	172	220
Passing: Comp–Att–Int	17–35–1	24–36–2
Time of possession	30:40	29:20

Team	Category	Player	Statistics
Washington State	Passing	John Mateer	17/35, 172 yards, INT
Washington State	Rushing	Wayshawn Parker	12 carries, 63 yards
Washington State	Receiving	Kyle Williams	3 receptions, 39 yards
Fresno State	Passing	Mikey Keene	24/36, 220 yards, TD, 2 INT
Fresno State	Rushing	Elijah Gilliam	20 carries, 120 yards, TD
Fresno State	Receiving	Mac Dalena	4 receptions, 61 yards

=== vs. Hawaii ===
Game Seven – Hawaii Rainbow Warriors (2–4) at Washington State Cougars (5–1) – Game summary

Quarter	1	2	3	4	Total
Rainbow Warriors	3	0	7	0	10
Cougars	7	14	7	14	42

at Martin Stadium • Pullman, WA

- Date: Saturday October 19, 2024
- Game time: 12:30 p.m.
- Game weather: 0 °F (−18 °C)
- TV announcers (The CW): Ted Robinson (play-by-play), Michael Bumpus (analyst), and Nigel Burton (sideline)

Game information

First quarter
Second quarter
Third quarter
Fourth quarter

Statistics	HAW	WSU
First downs	17	23
Total yards	300	444
Rushing yards	104	123
Passing yards	196	321
Passing: Comp–Att–Int	20–30–1	25–29–0
Time of possession	27:30	32:30

Team	Category	Player	Statistics
Hawaii	Passing	Brayden Schager	20/30, 196 yards, TD, INT
Hawaii	Rushing	Cam Barfield	6 carries, 47 yards
Hawaii	Receiving	Nick Cenacle	4 receptions, 48 yards
Washington State	Passing	John Mateer	23/27, 295 yards, 3 TD
Washington State	Rushing	Djouvensky Schlenbaker	8 carries, 48 yards
Washington State	Receiving	Kris Hutson	7 receptions, 90 yards, TD

=== at San Diego State ===
Washington State Cougars (6–1) at San Diego State Aztecs (3–3) – Game summary

Quarter	1	2	3	4	Total
Cougars	7	7	0	15	29
Aztecs	6	6	7	7	26

at Snapdragon Stadium • San Diego, CA

- Date: October 26, 2024
- Game time: 7:30 p.m.
- Game weather: Clear • Temperature: 67 °F (19 °C) • Wind: N 2 miles per hour (3.2 km/h)
- Game attendance: 26,937
- Referee: John Love
- TV announcers (CBSSN): Carter Blackburn (play-by-play) and Taylor McHargue (analyst)

Game information

First quarter

- WSU (12:26) – Cooper Mathers 26 yard pass from John Mateer (Dean Janikowski kick); 5 plays, 65 yards, 1:37 (Washington State 7-0)
- SDSU (8:54) – Gabriel Plascencia 46 yard field goal; 10 plays, 47 yards, 3:32 (Washington State 7-3)
- SDSU (0:00) – Gabriel Plascencia 28 yard field goal; 10 plays, 60 yards, 5:03 (Washington State 7-6)

Second quarter

- WSU (7:19) – John Mateer 1 yard run (Dean Janikowski kick); 16 plays, 74 yards, 7:37 (Washington State 14-6)
- SDSU (0:17) – Marquez Cooper 7 yard run (Two-point run conversion failed); 6 plays, 60 yards, 1:41 (Washington State 14-12)

Third quarter

- SDSU (7:05) – Nate Bennett 27 yard pass from Jordan Napier (Gabriel Plascencia kick); 3 plays, 43 yards, 1:06 (San Diego State 19-14)

Fourth quarter

- SDSU (13:39) – Marquez Cooper 1 yard run (Gabriel Plascencia Kick); 11 plays, 69 yards, 5:23 (San Diego State 26-14)
- WSU (12:08) – Carlos Hernandez 34 yard pass from John Mateer (Dean Janikowski kick); 4 plays, 80 yards, 1:27 (San Diego State 26-21)
- WSU (5:03) – John Mateer 2 yard run (John Mateer pass to Kris Hutson for two-point conversion); 7 plays, 63 yards, 3:28 (Washington State 29-26)

Statistics	WSU	SDSU
First downs	22	21
Total yards	371	414
Rushing yards	114	130
Passing yards	257	284
Passing: Comp–Att–Int	19–27–0	28–41–1
Time of possession	26:14	29:33

Team	Category	Player	Statistics
Washington State	Passing	John Mateer	19/27, 257 yards, 2 TD
Washington State	Rushing	John Mateer	21 carries, 42 yards, 2 TD
Washington State	Receiving	Kyle Williams	5 receptions, 74 yards
San Diego State	Passing	Danny O'Neil	22/34, 195 yards, INT
San Diego State	Rushing	Marquez Cooper	18 carries, 78 yards, 2 TD
San Diego State	Receiving	Ja'Shaun Poke	10 receptions, 80 yards

=== vs Utah State ===
Utah State Aggies (2–6) vs No. 21 Washington State Cougars (7–1) – Game summary

Quarter	1	2	3	4	Total
Aggies	7	0	7	14	28
No. 21 Cougars	7	14	14	14	49

at Martin Stadium • Pullman, WA

- Date: November 9, 2024
- Game time: 7:30 p.m.
- Game weather: Clear, 45 °F (7 °C)
- Game attendance: 20,011
- Referee: John Love
- TV announcers (The CW): Ted Robinson (play-by-play), Ryan Leaf (analyst) and Nigel Burton (sideline)

Game information

First quarter

- (10:24) WSU – Kyle Williams 17-yard pass from John Mateer, Dean Janikowski kick (Drive: 9 plays, 65 yards, 3:13; Washington State 7–0)
- (5:01) USU – Jack Hestera 3-yard pass from Spencer Petras, Tanner Cragun kick (Drive: 11 plays, 75 yards, 5:23; Tied 7–7)

Second quarter

- (14:57) WSU – Wayshawn Parker 1-yard run, Dean Janikowski kick (Drive: 12 plays, 85 yards, 4:59; Washington State 14–7)
- (7:17) WSU – Kyle Williams 14-yard pass from John Mateer, Dean Janikowski kick (Drive: 10 plays, 75 yards, 5:26; Washington State 21–7)

Third quarter

- (14:48) WSU – Wayshawn Parker 75-yard run, Dean Janikowski kick (Drive: 1 play, 75 yards, 0:12; Washington State 28–7)
- (5:52) WSU – John Mateer 1-yard run, Dean Janikowski kick (Drive: 6 plays, 65 yards, 3:34; Washington State 35–7)
- (2:02) USU – Bryson Barnes 2-yard run, Tanner Cragun kick (Drive: 11 plays, 75 yards, 3:50; Washington State 35–14)

Fourth quarter

- (14:49) WSU – Kyle Williams 5-yard pass from John Mateer, Dean Janikowski kick (Drive: 8 plays, 80 yards, 2:07; Washington State 42–14)
- (8:39) USU – Kyrese White 12-yard pass from Spencer Petras, Tanner Cragun kick (Drive: 13 plays, 70 yards, 6:01; Washington State 42–21)
- (1:05) WSU – Cooper Mathers 3-yard pass from John Mateer, Dean Janikowski kick (Drive: 11 plays, 53 yards, 7:31; Washington State 49–21)
- (0:41) USU – Derrick Jameson 72-yard run, Tanner Cragun kick (Drive: 3 plays, 75 yards, 0:24; Washington State 49–28)

Statistics	USU	WSU
First downs	21	28
Total yards	395	482
Rushing yards	187	303
Passing yards	208	179
Passing: Comp–Att–Int	28–45–1	18–24–0
Time of possession	27:15	32:45

Team	Category	Player	Statistics
Utah State	Passing	Spencer Petras	28/45, 208 yards, 2 TD, INT
Utah State	Rushing	Herschel Turner	16 carries, 85 yards
Utah State	Receiving	Grant Page	7 receptions, 54 yards
Washington State	Passing	John Mateer	18/24, 179 yards, 4 TD
Washington State	Rushing	Wayshawn Parker	11 carries, 149 yards, 2 TD
Washington State	Receiving	Kyle Williams	5 receptions, 55 yards, 3 TD

=== at New Mexico ===
Game Ten – No. 18 Washington State Cougars (8–1) vs New Mexico Lobos (4–6) – Game summary

Quarter	1	2	3	4	Total
No. 18 Cougars	14	14	0	7	35
Lobos	7	7	14	10	38

at University Stadium, Albuquerque, New Mexico

- Date: Saturday November 16, 2024
- Game time: 6:30 p.m.
- Game weather: Clear • Temperature: 47 °F (8 °C) • Wind: NE 6 miles per hour (9.7 km/h)
- Game attendance: 14,067
- Referee: Nolan Dumas
- TV announcers (FS1): Dan Hellie and Petros Papadakis

Game information

First quarter

- (9:32) UNM – Devon Dampier 7-yard run, Luke Drzewiecki kick (Drive: 11 plays, 75 yards, 5:28; New Mexico 7–0)
- (7:27) WSU – Carlos Hernandez 28-yard pass from John Mateer, Dean Janikowski kick (Drive: 5 plays, 90 yards, 1:59; Tied 7–7)
- (1:30) WSU – John Mateer 5-yard run, Dean Janikowski kick (Drive: 10 plays, 74 yards, 4:51; Washington State 14–7)

Second quarter

- (10:21) WSU – Kyle Williams 20-yard pass from John Mateer, Dean Janikowski kick (Drive: 8 plays, 93 yards, 4:03; Washington State 21–7)
- (5:31) UNM – Caleb Medford 42-yard pass from Devon Dampier, Luke Drzewiecki kick (Drive: 5 plays, 71 yards, 1:59; Washington State 21–14)
- (1:10) WSU – Kyle Williams 29-yard pass from John Mateer, Dean Janikowski kick (Drive: 10 plays, 75 yards, 4:21; Washington State 28–14)

Third quarter

- (10:20) UNM – Devon Dampier 33-yard run, Luke Drzewiecki kick (Drive: 10 plays, 80 yards, 3:51; Washington State 28–21)
- (0:25) UNM – Eli Sanders 26-yard run, Luke Drzewiecki kick (Drive: 7 plays, 71 yards, 3:12; Tied 28–28)

Fourth quarter

- (4:40) UNM – Luke Drzewiecki 19-yard field goal (Drive: 13 plays, 86 yards, 7:27; New Mexico 31–28)
- (3:12) WSU – Kyle Williams 37-yard pass from John Mateer, Dean Janikowski kick (Drive: 4 plays, 75 yards, 1:28; Washington State 35–31)
- (0:21) UNM – Devon Dampier 1-yard run, Luke Drzewiecki kick (Drive: 11 plays, 75 yards, 2:51; New Mexico 38–35)

Statistics	WSU	UNM
First downs	27	27
Total yards	547	534
Rushing yards	172	360
Passing yards	375	174
Turnovers	0	0
Time of possession	28:48	31:12

Team	Category	Player	Statistics
Washington State	Passing	John Mateer	25/36, 375 yards, 4 TD
Washington State	Rushing	John Mateer	9 carries, 65 yards, TD
Washington State	Receiving	Kyle Williams	9 receptions, 181 yards, 3 TD
New Mexico	Passing	Devon Dampier	11/25, 174 yards, TD
New Mexico	Rushing	Devon Dampier	28 carries, 193 yards, 3 TD
New Mexico	Receiving	Luke Wysong	5 receptions, 71 yards

=== at Oregon State ===
Washington State Cougars (8–2) at Oregon State Beavers (4–6) – Game summary

Quarter	1	2	3	4	Total
Cougars	7	10	7	14	38
Beavers	7	14	10	10	41

at Reser Stadium • Corvallis, OR

- Date: November 23, 2024
- Game time: 4:00 p.m.
- Game weather: 51 °F (11 °C)
- Game attendance: 38,008
- TV announcers (The CW): Ted Robinson (play-by-play), Ryan Leaf (analyst) and Nigel Burton (sideline)

Game information

First quarter
Second quarter
Third quarter
Fourth quarter

Statistics	WSU	OSU
First downs	20	27
Total yards	384	484
Rushing yards	134	170
Passing yards	250	314
Passing: Comp–Att–Int	17–23–0	23–36–2
Time of possession	21:37	38:23

Team	Category	Player	Statistics
Washington State	Passing	John Mateer	17/23, 250 yards, 2 TD
Washington State	Rushing	John Mateer	14 carries, 75 yards, 2 TD
Washington State	Receiving	Kyle Williams	5 receptions, 95 yards, TD
Oregon State	Passing	Ben Gulbranson	22/34, 294 yards, 2 TD, 2 INT
Oregon State	Rushing	Anthony Hankerson	23 carries, 83 yards
Oregon State	Receiving	Trent Walker	12 receptions, 136 yards

=== vs Wyoming ===
Wyoming Cowboys (2–9) vs Washington State Cougars (8–3) – Game summary

Quarter	1	2	3	4	Total
Cowboys	3	3	3	6	15
Cougars	7	7	0	0	14

at Martin Stadium • Pullman, WA

- Date: November 30, 2024
- Game time: 3:30 p.m.
- Game weather: Clear, 40 °F (4 °C)
- Game attendance: 17,088
- Referee: John Love
- TV announcers (The CW): Ted Robinson (play-by-play), Ryan Leaf (analyst) and Nigel Burton (sideline)

Game information

First quarter

- (6:08) WSU – Kyle Williams 37 yard pass from John Mateer, Dean Janikowski kick (Drive: 5 plays, 70 yards, 2:12; WSU 7–0)
- (0:04) WYO – John Hoyland 40 yard field goal (Drive: 10 plays, 52 yards, 6:05; WSU 7–3)

Second quarter

- (9:42) WSU – John Mateer 2 yard run, Dean Janikowski kick (Drive: 10 plays, 74 yards, 5:18; WSU 14–3)
- (0:00) WYO – John Hoyland 22 yard field goal (Drive: 7 plays, 60 yards, 0:42; WSU 14–6)

Third quarter

- (2:07) WYO – John Hoyland 42 yard field goal (Drive: 14 plays, 62 yards, 6:02; WSU 14–9)

Fourth quarter

- (0:24) WYO – John Michael Gyllenborg 18 yard pass from Evan Svoboda, 2 point conversion failed (Drive: 14 plays, 90 yards, 3:15; WYO 15–14)

Statistics	WYO	WSU
First downs	22	15
Total yards	340	285
Rushing yards	134	103
Passing yards	206	182
Passing: Comp–Att–Int	21–34–1	16–22–1
Time of possession	34:14	25:46

Team	Category	Player	Statistics
Wyoming	Passing	Evan Svoboda	21/34, 206 yards, TD, INT
Wyoming	Rushing	Harrison Waylee	12 carries, 69 yards
Wyoming	Receiving	John Michael Gyllenborg	4 receptions, 61 yards, TD
Washington State	Passing	John Mateer	16/22, 182 yards, TD, INT
Washington State	Rushing	John Mateer	18 carries, 56 yards, TD
Washington State	Receiving	Kris Hutson	5 receptions, 62 yards

=== vs No. 21 Syracuse (Holiday Bowl) ===
2024 DirecTV Holiday Bowl
No. 21 Syracuse Orange (9–3) vs Washington State Cougars (8–4) – Game summary

Quarter	1	2	3	4	Total
No. 21 Orange	14	21	7	10	52
Cougars	21	0	7	7	35

at Snapdragon Stadium • San Diego, California

- Date: Friday, December 27, 2024
- Game time: 5:00 p.m. PST
- Game weather: Cloudy • Temperature: 59 °F (15 °C) • Wind: 3 mph (4.8 km/h) southwest
- Game attendance: 23,920
- Referee: Jerry McGinn
- TV announcers (Fox): Gus Johnson (play-by-play), Joel Klatt (analyst), and Jenny Taft (sideline)

Game information

First quarter

- (9:47) WSU – Zevi Eckhaus 4-yard run, Dean Janikowski kick (Drive: 8 plays, 68 yards, 3:57; Washington State 7–0)
- (7:03) SYR – Trebor Pena 19-yard pass from Kyle McCord, 2-point run conversion failed (Drive: 6 plays, 75 yards, 2:44; Washington State 7–6)
- (2:32) SYR – LeQuint Allen 12-yard run, Kyle McCord pass to LeQuint Allen for 2-point conversion (Drive: 4 plays, 51 yards, 1:22; Washington State 14–7)
- (1:22) WSU – Kyle Williams 66-yard pass from Zevi Eckhaus, Dean Janikowski kick (Drive: 3 plays, 73 yards, 1:03; Tied 14–14)
- (0:17) WSU – Josh Meredith 12-yard punt return, Dean Janikowski kick (Drive: 3 plays, 2 yards, 1:05; Washington State 21–14)

Second quarter

- (12:53) SYR – Oronde Gadsden II 18-yard pass from Kyle McCord, Jackson Kennedy kick (Drive: 7 plays, 75 yards, 2:24; Tied 21–21)
- (7:34) SYR – LeQuint Allen 2-yard run, Jackson Kennedy kick (Drive: 8 plays, 94 yards, 2:49; Syracuse 28–21)
- (0:13) SYR – Oronde Gadsden II 5-yard pass from Kyle McCord, Jackson Kennedy kick (Drive: 8 plays, 80 yards, 2:55; Syracuse 35–21)

Third quarter

- (2:06) WSU – Carlos Hernandez 42-yard pass from Zevi Eckhaus, Dean Janikowski kick (Drive: 10 plays, 79 yards, 5:02; Syracuse 35–28)
- (1:19) SYR – Trebor Pena 45-yard pass from Kyle McCord, Jackson Kennedy kick (Drive: 2 plays, 49 yards, 0:39; Syracuse 42–28)

Fourth quarter

- (9:19) SYR – Jackson Kennedy 30-yard field goal (Drive: 9 plays, 54 yards, 4:56; Syracuse 45–28)
- (3:23) SYR – LeQuint Allen 33-yard pass from Kyle McCord, Jackson Kennedy kick (Drive: 3 plays, 80 yards, 1:39; Syracuse 52–28)
- (0:09) WSU – Branden Ganashamoorthy 9-yard pass from Zevi Eckhaus, Dean Janikowski kick (Drive: 11 plays, 67 yards, 3:06; Syracuse 52–35)

Statistics	SYR	WSU
First downs	28	24
Total yards	606	472
Rushing yards	153	109
Passing yards	453	363
Passing: Comp–Att–Int	24–34–0	31–43–2
Time of possession	25:24	34:36

Team	Category	Player	Statistics
Syracuse	Passing	Kyle McCord	24/34, 453 yards, 5 TD
Syracuse	Rushing	LeQuint Allen	17 carries, 120 yards, 2 TD
Syracuse	Receiving	Darrell Gill Jr.	4 receptions, 145 yards
Washington State	Passing	Zevi Eckhaus	31/43, 363 yards, 3 TD, 2 INT
Washington State	Rushing	Leo Pulalasi	14 carries, 61 yards
Washington State	Receiving	Kyle Williams	10 receptions, 172 yards, TD

== Rankings ==
Ranking movements Legend: ██ Increase in ranking ██ Decrease in ranking — = Not ranked RV = Received votes
	Week																
Poll	Pre	1	2	3	4	5	6	7	8	9	10	11	12	13	14	15	Final
AP	—	—	—	RV	RV	—	RV	RV	RV	22	20	19	25	RV	—	—	—
Coaches	—	—	—	RV	RV	—	—	RV	RV	22	20	18	RV	RV	—	—	—
CFP	Not released										21	18	—	—	—	—	Not released
