= John Mateer =

American football player (born 2004)

No. 10 – Oklahoma Sooners
- Position: Quarterback
- Class: (redshirt) Senior

Personal information
- Born: April 28, 2004 (age 22); Little Elm, Texas, U.S.
- Listed height: 6 ft 1 in (1.85 m)
- Listed weight: 218 lb (99 kg)

Career information
- High school: Little Elm (Little Elm, Texas)
- College: Washington State (2022–2024); Oklahoma (2025–present)

Awards and highlights
- Pac-12 Offensive Top Performer (2024)
- Stats at ESPN

John Lowrie Mateer (born April 28, 2004) is an American college football quarterback for the Oklahoma Sooners. He previously played for the Washington State Cougars.

== Early life ==
Mateer was born in Little Elm, Texas. He attended and played football at Little Elm High School. As a senior, Mateer threw for 2,449 yards, setting the school record for single season passing yards. He finished his high school career totaling 7,060 passing yards, 1,223 rushing yards and 88 total touchdowns. A three-star recruit, he committed to play college football at Washington State University.

== College career ==
=== Washington State ===
After redshirting in 2022, Mateer threw for 235 yards and two touchdowns, in addition to rushing for 93 yards and three touchdowns as a redshirt freshman. Entering the 2024 season, he competed with Zevi Eckhaus for Washington State's starting quarterback job. Eventually, Mateer was named the Cougars starting quarterback for their first game of the season against Portland State. In his first career start, he threw for 352 yards and five touchdowns, while also rushing for 55 yards and a touchdown, leading Washington State to a 70–30 victory. Mateer finished the season throwing for 3,139 yards, rushing for 826 yards, and totaling 44 touchdowns. He was named the offensive "top performer" of the season for the Pac-12 Conference. On December 16, 2024, Mateer entered the transfer portal.

=== Oklahoma ===
On December 18, 2024, Mateer announced his decision to transfer to the University of Oklahoma to play for the Oklahoma Sooners. The decision was influenced by several factors, including a missed phone call from Baker Mayfield and his existing relationship with newly hired offensive coordinator Ben Arbuckle, whom he had played for at Washington State. In the 2025 season opener against Illinois State, Mateer broke the school record for number of passing yards in a debut with 392, in a 35–3 win. The following week against No. 15 Michigan, he completed 21 passes for 270 yards and a touchdown, while also rushing for 74 yards and two touchdowns, leading the Sooners to a 24–13 victory. Against Auburn, Mateer sustained an injury to his throwing hand and subsequently underwent surgery. He returned less than three weeks after undergoing surgery, having missed one game. Mateer led Oklahoma to a 10–3 record and an appearance in the College Football Playoff. He finished the 2025 season with 2,885 passing yards, 14 touchdowns and 11 interceptions, while adding 431 rushing yards and eight touchdowns.

On January 15, 2026, Mateer announced that he would return to Oklahoma for his senior season. Against No. 1 Texas in the Red River Rivalry, he led the unranked Sooners to a 27–24 upset victory, completing 18 passes for 155 yards without committing a turnover.

=== Statistics ===
Year	Team	Games			Passing								Rushing			
Year	Team	GP	GS	Record	Cmp	Att	Pct	Yds	Y/A	TD	Int	Rtg	Att	Yds	Avg	TD
2022	Washington State	1	0	—	2	2	100.0	32	16.0	1	0	399.4	4	58	14.5	0
2023	Washington State	11	0	—	13	17	76.5	235	13.8	2	1	219.6	21	92	4.4	3
2024	Washington State	12	12	8–4	224	347	64.6	3,139	9.0	29	7	164.1	178	826	4.6	15
2025	Oklahoma	12	12	9–3	247	397	62.2	2,885	7.3	14	11	129.4	149	431	2.9	8
2026	Oklahoma	10	10	6–4	193	299	64.5	2,153	7.2	15	7	136.9	116	271	2.3	1
Career		46	34	23–11	679	1,062	63.9	8,444	8.0	61	26	144.8	468	1,678	3.6	27

== Personal life ==
On August 11, 2025, screenshots began to surface of Mateer's Venmo account, depicting transaction descriptions that alluded to him partaking in sports betting while playing for Washington State in 2022. The next day, Mateer denied any involvement in sports gambling, stating that the transaction descriptions were "inside jokes" between his friends.
