= Zevi Eckhaus =

American football player

Profile
- Position: Quarterback

Personal information
- Listed height: 6 ft 0 in (1.83 m)
- Listed weight: 209 lb (95 kg)

Career information
- High school: Culver City (Culver City, California)
- College: Bryant (2021–2023); Washington State (2024–2025)

Awards and highlights
- Big South–OVC Offensive Player of the Year (2023); First-team All-Big South–OVC (2023); Second-team All-Big South (2022); NEC Offensive Rookie of the Year (2021); First-team All-NEC (2021)
- Stats at ESPN

Zevi Eckhaus is an American former football quarterback. He previously played college football for the Bryant Bulldogs and the Washington State Cougars.

== Early life ==
Eckhaus attended Culver City High School in Culver City, California. As a freshman, Eckhaus became the first player in school history to start as a freshman at any position. As a senior, he passed for 1,893 yards and 24 touchdowns during a shortened five-game season. He finished his high school career throwing for a school-record 10,210 yards and 137 touchdowns, before committing to play college football at Bryant University.

== College career ==
=== Bryant ===
As a freshman, Eckhaus made ten starts, throwing for 2,392 yards and 21 touchdowns, and was named the NEC Offensive Rookie of the Year as a result. As a junior, he threw for 2,907 yards and 28 touchdowns and was named the Big South–OVC Offensive Player of the Year. His 28 touchdown passes tied the single-season school record, and his 75 career touchdown passes set the career-school record. In the final game of his junior season against Southeast Missouri State, Eckhaus threw for 394 yards and a career-high six touchdowns, leading Bryant to a 45–21 victory. At the conclusion of his junior year, Eckhaus entered the transfer portal.

=== Washington State ===
After originally committing to Jacksonville State, Eckhaus flipped his commitment to Washington State University to play for the Washington State Cougars. Entering the 2024 season, Eckhaus competed with John Mateer for Washington State's starting quarterback job, with Eckhaus being named the back-up to Mateer to begin the season. At the conclusion of the regular season, Mateer transferred to Oklahoma, and Eckhaus was named the starting quarterback against Syracuse in the 2024 Holiday Bowl. In the Holiday Bowl, he threw for 363 yards and totaled four touchdowns and two interceptions in a 52–35 loss. After the game, Eckhaus entered the transfer portal. However, just two days later, he withdrew his name from the portal.

Eckhaus was named the back-up behind Jaxon Potter to begin the 2025 season. Following poor performance from Potter, Eckhaus was named the Cougar's starting quarterback against Washington in the Apple Cup. In his first start of the season, he combined for three touchdowns and two interceptions in the 59–24 defeat.

== Personal life ==
Eckhaus is Jewish. He has spoken about the challenges of maintaining Kosher and Shabbat as a football player however he still prays, studies Torah and puts on both Rashi and Rabbeinu Tam tefillin daily.

=== Statistics ===
Season	Team	Games			Passing								Rushing			
Season	Team	GP	GS	Record	Comp	Att	Pct	Yards	Avg	TD	Int	Rate	Att	Yards	Avg	TD
2021	Bryant	11	10	7–3	233	371	62.8	2,392	6.4	21	3	133.1	71	242	3.4	2
2022	Bryant	11	11	4–7	253	416	60.8	3,228	7.8	26	15	139.4	72	165	2.3	2
2023	Bryant	11	11	6–5	238	379	62.8	2,907	7.7	28	7	147.9	78	353	4.5	0
2024	Washington State	2	1	0–1	37	50	74.0	424	8.5	4	2	163.6	11	28	2.5	1
2025	Washington State	11	10	5–5	193	307	62.9	2,094	6.8	15	12	128.5	114	371	3.3	8
Career		46	43	22−21	953	1,522	62.6	11,031	7.2	94	39	138.8	345	1,161	3.3	14
