= 2024 Holiday Bowl =

Postseason college football bowl game

2024 DirecTV Holiday Bowl
- 45th Holiday Bowl
Syracuse Orange	Washington State Cougars
(9–3)	(8–4)
ACC	Pac-12
52	35
Head coach: Fran Brown	Head coach: Pete Kaligis (interim)
AP / Coaches / CFP; 22 / 25 / 21
	1	2	3	4	Total
Syracuse	14	21	7	10	52
Washington State	21	0	7	7	35
- Date: December 27, 2024
- Season: 2024
- Stadium: Snapdragon Stadium
- Location: San Diego, California
- MVP: Off.: Kyle McCord (QB, Syracuse); Def.: Alijah Clark (DB, Syracuse)
- Favorite: Syracuse by 18.5
- Referee: Jerry McGinn (Big Ten)
- Attendance: 23,920

United States TV coverage
- Network: Fox
- Announcers: Gus Johnson (play-by-play), Joel Klatt (analyst), and Jenny Taft (sideline)

The 2024 Holiday Bowl was a college football bowl game played on December 27, 2024, at Snapdragon Stadium in San Diego, California. The 45th annual Holiday Bowl game featured the Syracuse Orange from the Atlantic Coast Conference (ACC) and the Washington State Cougars from the Pac-12 Conference. The game began at approximately 5:00 p.m. PST and aired on Fox. It was one of the 2024–25 bowl games concluding the 2024 FBS football season. This was the first edition of the bowl contested at Snapdragon Stadium. Sponsored by multichannel video programming distributor DirecTV, the game was officially known as the DirecTV Holiday Bowl.

== Teams ==
The bowl featured the Syracuse Orange of the Atlantic Coast Conference (ACC) and the Washington State Cougars of the Pac-12 Conference. This was the second meeting between these teams; the first came in 1979, when the Orange defeated the Cougars, 52–25.

=== Washington State Cougars ===
Washington State recorded a 8–4 record during the regular season (0–1 in the Pac-12), finishing second of the two teams that competed in the conference during 2024. The Cougars had an 8–1 record at one point and were briefly ranked 18th in the nation, before losing their final three regular-season games. The Cougars were led by interim head coach Pete Kaligis, who took over in mid-December when Jake Dickert departed for another coaching role. This was Washington State's fifth Holiday Bowl; the Cougars were 1–3 in their four previous appearances, winning in 2003 and losing in 1981, 2016, and 2017.

=== Syracuse Orange ===
Syracuse played to a 9–3 record (5–3 in the ACC) during the regular season, tied for fourth place in their conference and ranked 21st in the final College Football Playoff (CFP) rankings. The Orange ended their regular season with three consecutive wins. This was Syracuse's first appearance in the Holiday Bowl.

== Game summary ==
2024 DirecTV Holiday Bowl

Quarter	1	2	3	4	Total
No. 21 Syracuse	14	21	7	10	52
Washington State	21	0	7	7	35

at Snapdragon Stadium • San Diego, California

- Date: Friday, December 27, 2024
- Game time: 5:06 p.m. PST
- Game weather: Cloudy • Temperature: 59 °F (15 °C) • Wind: 3 mph (4.8 km/h) southwest
- Game attendance: 23,920
- Referee: Jerry McGinn
- TV announcers (Fox): Gus Johnson (play-by-play), Joel Klatt (analyst), and Jenny Taft (sideline)
- Box score

Game information

First quarter

- (9:47) WSU – Zevi Eckhaus 4-yard run, Dean Janikowski kick (Drive: 8 plays, 68 yards, 3:57; Washington State 7–0)
- (7:03) SYR – Trebor Pena 19-yard pass from Kyle McCord, 2-point run conversion failed (Drive: 6 plays, 75 yards, 2:44; Washington State 7–6)
- (2:32) SYR – LeQuint Allen 12-yard run, Kyle McCord pass to LeQuint Allen for 2-point conversion (Drive: 4 plays, 51 yards, 1:22; Syracuse 14–7)
- (1:22) WSU – Kyle Williams 66-yard pass from Zevi Eckhaus, Dean Janikowski kick (Drive: 3 plays, 73 yards, 1:03; Tied 14–14)
- (0:17) WSU – Josh Meredith 12-yard punt return, Dean Janikowski kick (Drive: 3 plays, 2 yards, 1:05; Washington State 21–14)

Second quarter

- (12:53) SYR – Oronde Gadsden II 18-yard pass from Kyle McCord, Jackson Kennedy kick (Drive: 7 plays, 75 yards, 2:24; Tied 21–21)
- (7:34) SYR – LeQuint Allen 2-yard run, Jackson Kennedy kick (Drive: 8 plays, 94 yards, 2:49; Syracuse 28–21)
- (0:13) SYR – Oronde Gadsden II 5-yard pass from Kyle McCord, Jackson Kennedy kick (Drive: 8 plays, 80 yards, 2:55; Syracuse 35–21)

Third quarter

- (2:06) WSU – Carlos Hernandez 42-yard pass from Zevi Eckhaus, Dean Janikowski kick (Drive: 10 plays, 79 yards, 5:02; Syracuse 35–28)
- (1:19) SYR – Trebor Pena 45-yard pass from Kyle McCord, Jackson Kennedy kick (Drive: 2 plays, 49 yards, 0:39; Syracuse 42–28)

Fourth quarter

- (9:19) SYR – Jackson Kennedy 30-yard field goal (Drive: 9 plays, 54 yards, 4:56; Syracuse 45–28)
- (3:23) SYR – LeQuint Allen 33-yard pass from Kyle McCord, Jackson Kennedy kick (Drive: 3 plays, 80 yards, 1:39; Syracuse 52–28)
- (0:09) WSU – Branden Ganashamoorthy 9-yard pass from Zevi Eckhaus, Dean Janikowski kick (Drive: 11 plays, 67 yards, 3:06; Syracuse 52–35)

=== Statistics ===
Statistics	SU	WSU
First downs	28	24
Plays–yards	60–606	74–472
Rushes–yards	26–153	31–109
Passing yards	453	363
Passing: comp–att–int	24–34–0	31–43–2
Turnovers		
Time of possession	25:24	34:36

Team	Category	Player	Statistics
Syracuse	Passing	Kyle McCord	24/34, 453 yards, 5 TD
Syracuse	Rushing	LeQuint Allen	17 carries, 120 yards, 2 TD
Syracuse	Receiving	Darrell Gill Jr.	4 receptions, 145 yards
Washington State	Passing	Zevi Eckhaus	31/43, 363 yards, 3 TD, 2 INT
Washington State	Rushing	Leo Pulalasi	14 carries, 61 yards
Washington State	Receiving	Kyle Williams	10 receptions, 172 yards, TD
