= 2023 Washington State Cougars football team =

American college football season

2023 Washington State Cougars football
- Conference: Pac–12 Conference
- Record: 5–7 (2–7 Pac–12)
- Head coach: Jake Dickert (3rd season)
- Offensive coordinator: Ben Arbuckle (1st season)
- Offensive scheme: Air raid
- Defensive coordinator: Jeff Schmedding (1st season)
- Base defense: 4–2–5
- Captain: Cam Ward
- Home stadium: Martin Stadium

2023 Pac-12 Conference football standings
	Conf.			Overall
Team	W		L	W		L
No. 2 Washington y$^	9	–	0	14	–	1
No. 6 Oregon y	8	–	1	12	–	2
No. 11 Arizona	7	–	2	10	–	3
Oregon State	5	–	4	8	–	5
Utah	5	–	4	8	–	5
USC	5	–	4	8	–	5
California	4	–	5	6	–	7
UCLA	4	–	5	8	–	5
Washington State	2	–	7	5	–	7
Stanford	2	–	7	3	–	9
Arizona State*	2	–	7	3	–	9
Colorado	1	–	8	4	–	8
Championship: Washington 34, Oregon 31
^ – College Football Playoff participant; $ – Conference champion; y – Championship game participant; * – Ineligible for postseason play due to self-imposed ban for 2020 recruiting violations; Rankings from AP Poll

The 2023 Washington State Cougars football team represented Washington State University in the Pac–12 Conference during the 2023 NCAA Division I FBS football season. The Cougars were led by Jake Dickert in his third year as head coach. They played their home games at Martin Stadium in Pullman, Washington. The Washington State Cougars football team drew an average home attendance of 28,023 in 2023.

== Schedule ==
Date	Time	Opponent	Rank	Site	TV	Result	Attendance
September 2	4:00 p.m.	at Colorado State*		Canvas Stadium; Fort Collins, CO	CBSSN	W 50–24	31,497
September 9	4:30 p.m.	No. 19 Wisconsin*		Martin Stadium; Pullman, WA	ABC	W 31–22	33,024
September 16	2:00 p.m.	Northern Colorado*	No. 23	Martin Stadium; Pullman, WA	P12N	W 64–21	23,595
September 23	4:00 p.m.	No. 14 Oregon State	No. 21	Martin Stadium; Pullman, WA	FOX	W 38–35	33,024
October 7	12:00 p.m.	at UCLA	No. 13	Rose Bowl; Pasadena, CA	P12N	L 17–25	35,437
October 14	4:00 p.m.	Arizona^{†}	No. 19	Martin Stadium; Pullman, WA	P12N	L 6–44	26,155
October 21	12:30 p.m.	at No. 9 Oregon		Autzen Stadium; Eugene, OR	ABC	L 24–38	58,886
October 28	5:00 p.m.	at Arizona State		Mountain America Stadium; Tempe, AZ	P12N	L 27–38	47,284
November 4	6:00 p.m.	Stanford		Martin Stadium; Pullman, WA	P12N	L 7–10	24,385
November 11	1:00 p.m.	at California		California Memorial Stadium; Berkeley, CA	ESPN2	L 39–42	38,155
November 17	7:30 p.m.	Colorado		Martin Stadium; Pullman, WA	FS1	W 56–14	27,869
November 25	1:00 p.m.	at No. 4 Washington		Husky Stadium; Seattle, WA (Apple Cup)	FOX	L 21–24	71,312
*Non-conference game; ^{†}Homecoming; Rankings from AP Poll released prior to the game; All times are in Pacific time

== Game summaries ==
=== at Colorado State ===
Washington State Cougars (0–0) at Colorado State Rams (0–0) – Game summary

Quarter	1	2	3	4	Total
Cougars	7	10	12	21	50
Rams	3	0	0	21	24

at Canvas Stadium • Fort Collins, Colorado

- Date: September 2nd
- Game time: 5:00 p.m. MST/4:00 p.m. PST
- Game weather: Temperature: 88 °F (31 °C) • Wind: SW at 8 miles per hour (13 km/h) • Weather: Sunny
- Game attendance: 31,497
- Referee: Jeff Dahle
- TV announcers (CBSSN): Dave Ryan (play-by-play), and Corey Chavous (analyst)

Game information

First quarter

Second quarter

Third quarter

Fourth quarter

Statistics	Washington State	Colorado State
First downs	30	18
Plays–yards	556	357
Rushes–yards	90	37
Passing yards	466	320
Passing: comp–att–int	38-50-1	28-44-2
Turnovers		
Time of possession	37:40	22:20

Team	Category	Player	Statistics
Washington State	Passing	Cam Ward	27-49, 451 yards, 3 TDs
Washington State	Rushing	Cam Ward	13 rushes, 40 yards, TD
Washington State	Receiving	Lincoln Victor	11 receptions, 168 yards
Colorado State	Passing	Brayden Fowler-Nicolosi	13-20, 210 yards, 2 TDs, 1 INT
Colorado State	Rushing	Avery Morrow	11 rushes, 29 yards
Colorado State	Receiving	Justus Ross-Simmons	5 receptions, 123 yards, TD

=== vs No. 19 Wisconsin ===
No. 19 Wisconsin Badgers (1–0) vs. Washington State Cougars (1–0) – Game summary

Quarter	1	2	3	4	Total
No. 19 Badgers	3	6	13	0	22
Cougars	7	17	0	7	31

at Martin Stadium, Pullman, Washington

- Date: September 9, 2023
- Game time: 6:30 p.m.
- Game weather: 84 °F (29 °C); Sunny; Wind at NE6 MPH
- Game attendance: 33,024
- Referee: Tyler Wadekamper
- TV announcers (ABC): Mark Jones (play-by-play), Louis Riddick (analyst), and Quint Kessenich (sideline)

Game information

First quarter

- WSU – Kyle Williams 4-yard pass from Cam Ward (Dean Janikowski kick), 5:34. Washington State 7–0. Drive: 8 plays, 62 yards, 4:02.
- WIS – Nathanial Vakos 49-yard field goal, 1:07. Washington State 7–3. Drive: 10 plays, 29 yards, 4:21.

Second quarter

- WSU – Lincoln Victor 1-yard pass from Cam Ward (Dean Janikowski kick), 14:10. Washington State 14–3. Drive: 5 plays, 87 yards, 1:44.
- WIS – Nathanial Vakos 34-yard field goal, 10:17. Washington State 14–6. Drive: 9 plays, 59 yards, 3:53.
- WSU – Dean Janikowski 46-yard field goal, 7:14. Washington State 17–6. Drive: 9 plays, 46 yards, 3:03.
- WSU – Brennan Jackson 2-yard fumble return (Dean Janikowski kick), 2:08. Washington State 24–6. 0:41.
- WIS – Nathanial Vakos 29-yard field goal, 0:21. Washington State 24–9. Drive: 8 plays, 64 yards, 1:47.

Third quarter

- WIS – Chez Mellusi 2-yard run (Nathanial Vakos kick), 6:15 Washington State 24–16 Drive: 7 plays, 34 yards, 3:58.
- WIS – Skyler Bell 16-yard pass from Tanner Mordecai (failed 2-point conversion attempt by Chez Mellusi), 0:25. Washington State 24–22. Drive: 5 plays, 80 yards, 2:08.

Fourth quarter

- WSU – Nakia Watson 1-yard run (Dean Janikowski kick), 5:30. Washington State 31–22 Drive: 10 plays, 57 yards, 3:49.

Statistics	Wisconsin	Washington State
First downs	20	19
Plays–yards	69–368	68–333
Rushes–yards	29–91	34–86
Passing yards	277	247
Passing: comp–att–int	25–40–0	22–34–0
Turnovers		
Time of possession	29:32	30:28

Team	Category	Player	Statistics
Wisconsin	Passing	Tanner Mordecai	25/40, 278 yards, 1 TD
Wisconsin	Rushing	Chez Mellusi	12 rushes, 49 yards, 1 TD
Wisconsin	Receiving	Will Pauling	5 receptions, 78 yards
Washington State	Passing	Cam Ward	20/32, 212 yards, 2 TD
Washington State	Rushing	Cam Ward	17 rushes, 43 yards
Washington State	Receiving	Lincoln Victor	7 receptions, 55 yards, 1 TD

=== vs Northern Colorado ===
Northern Colorado Bears (0–2) at No. 23 Washington State Cougars (2–0) – Game summary

Quarter	1	2	3	4	Total
Bears	0	7	7	7	21
No. 23 Cougars	22	21	14	7	64

at Martin Stadium • Pullman, WA

- Date: September 16, 2023
- Game time: 2:00 p.m.
- Game weather: Sunny • Temperature: 81 °F (27 °C) • Wind: SW 8 mph
- Game attendance: 23,595
- Referee: Gary Reed
- TV announcers (P12N): Matt Chazanow (play-by-play) and Michael Bumpus (analyst)

Game information

First quarter

- (10:28) WSU – Cam Ward 8-yard run, Billy Riviere pass (Drive: 10 plays, 75 yards, 4:32; Washington State 8–0)
- (6:08) WSU – Kyle Williams 37-yard pass from Cam Ward, Dean Janikowski kick (Drive: 6 plays, 70 yards, 3:23; Washington State 15–0)
- (3:41) WSU – Lincoln Victor 28-yard pass from Cam Ward, Dean Janikowski kick (Drive: 4 plays, 64 yards, 1:07; Washington State 22–0)

Second quarter

- (12:27) WSU – Josh Kelly 18-yard pass from Cam Ward, Dean Janikowski kick (Drive: 7 plays, 70 yards, 2:33; Washington State 29–0)
- (8:45) WSU – Nakia Watson 6-yard run, Dean Janikowski kick (Drive: 7 plays, 64 yards, 1:40; Washington State 36–0)
- (3:20) WSU – Lincoln Victor 31-yard pass from Cam Ward, Dean Janikowski kick (Drive: 7 plays, 74 yards, 2:31; Washington State 43–0)
- (0:12) NCU – Jamarii Robinson 18-yard pass from Jacob Sirmon, Hunter Green kick (Drive: 8 plays, 75 yards, 3:08; Washington State 43–7)

Third quarter

- (9:43) WSU – Josh Meredith 15-yard pass from John Mateer, Dean Janikowski kick (Drive: 7 plays, 93 yards, 2:38; Washington State 50–7)
- (5:45) NCU – Hank Gibbs 1-yard run, Hunter Green kick (Drive: 7 plays, 75 yards, 3:58; Washington State 50–14)
- (5:10) WSU – Tsion Nunnally 72-yard pass from John Mateer, Dean Janikowski kick (Drive: 2 plays, 75 yards, 0:30; Washington State 57–14)

Fourth quarter

- (13:46) WSU – Dylan Paine 1-yard run, Dean Janikowski kick (Drive: 10 plays, 80 yards, 4:04; Washington State 64–14)
- (11:36) NCU – Darius Stewart 52-yard pass from Jacob Sirmon, Hunter Green kick (Drive: 5 plays, 75 yards, 2:10; Washington State 64–21)

Statistics	NCU	WSU
First downs	17	33
Total yards	366	718
Rushes/yards	31–158	36–229
Passing yards	208	489
Passing: Comp–Att–Int	18–30–0	29–38–1
Time of possession	29:11	30:49

Team	Category	Player	Statistics
Northern Colorado	Passing	Jacob Sirmon	16/24, 171 yards, 2 TD
Northern Colorado	Rushing	David Afari	17 carries, 116 yards
Northern Colorado	Receiving	Blake Haggerty	6 receptions, 70 yards
Washington State	Passing	Cam Ward	20/26, 327 yards, 4 TD
Washington State	Rushing	Dylan Paine	7 carries, 71 yards, TD
Washington State	Receiving	Lincoln Victor	6 receptions, 119 yards, 2 TD

=== vs No. 14 Oregon State ===
No. 14 Oregon State Beavers (3–0) at No. 21 Washington State Cougars (3–0) – Game summary

Quarter	1	2	3	4	Total
No. 14 Beavers	7	7	0	21	35
No. 21 Cougars	14	14	7	3	38

at Martin Stadium • Pullman, Washington

- Date: September 23
- Game time: 4:00 p.m.
- Game attendance: 33,024
- TV announcers (FOX): Jeff Levering (play-by-play), Mark Helfrich (analyst)
- Spread: • Odds to win: •

Game information

First quarter

Second quarter

Third quarter

Fourth quarter

Statistics	Oregon State	Washington State
First downs	25	27
Plays–yards	73–440	65–528
Rushes–yards	39–242	30–106
Passing yards	198	422
Passing: comp–att–int	17–34–1	29–35–0
Turnovers		
Time of possession	31:33	28:27

Team	Category	Player	Statistics
Oregon State	Passing	DJ Uiagalelei	17/24, 198 yards, TD, INT
Oregon State	Rushing	Deshaun Fenwick	11 carries, 101 yards, 3 TD
Oregon State	Receiving	Silas Bolden	5 receptions, 76 yards
Washington State	Passing	Cam Ward	28/34, 404 yards, 4 TD
Washington State	Rushing	Nakia Watson	8 carries, 46 yards
Washington State	Receiving	Kyle Williams	7 receptions, 174 yards, TD

=== at UCLA ===
No. 13 Washington State Cougars (4–0) vs UCLA Bruins (3–1) – Game summary

Quarter	1	2	3	4	Total
No. 13 Cougars	3	7	7	0	17
Bruins	0	9	3	13	25

at Rose Bowl • Pasadena, CA

- Date: October 7, 2023
- Game time: 12:01 p.m.
- Game weather: Sunny, 89 °F (32 °C)
- Game attendance: 35,437
- Referee: Mike McCabe
- TV announcers (P12N): Ted Robinson (play-by-play), Yogi Roth (analyst)

Game information

First quarter
Second quarter
Third quarter
Fourth quarter

Statistics	WSU	UCLA
First downs	11	24
Total yards	216	471
Rushes/yards	19–12	53–181
Passing yards	204	290
Passing: Comp–Att–Int	20–40–2	22–44–2
Time of possession	21:45	38:15

Team	Category	Player	Statistics
Washington State	Passing	Cam Ward	22/44, 290 yards, TD, 2 INT
Washington State	Rushing	Nakia Watson	11 carries, 25 yards
Washington State	Receiving	Kyle Williams	8 receptions, 85 yards
UCLA	Passing	Dante Moore	22/44, 290 yards, TD, 2 INT
UCLA	Rushing	Carson Steele	30 carries, 141 yards
UCLA	Receiving	Moliki Matavao	3 receptions, 76 yards

=== vs Arizona ===
Arizona Wildcats (3–3) at No. 19 Washington State Cougars (4–1) – Game summary

Quarter	1	2	3	4	Total
Wildcats	10	10	10	14	44
No. 19 Cougars	6	0	0	0	6

at Martin Stadium • Pullman, WA

- Date: October 14, 2023
- Game time: 4:07 p.m.
- Game weather: Sunny, 67 °F (19 °C)
- Game attendance: 26,155
- Referee: Matthew Richards
- TV announcers (P12N): Ted Robinson (play-by-play), Yogi Roth (analyst)

Game information

First quarter

- (10:01) WSU – Nakia Watson 1-yard run, two-point pass failed (Drive: 11 plays, 75 yards, 4:59; Washington State 6–0)
- (8:29) ARIZ – Jonah Coleman 1-yard run, Tyler Loop kick (Drive: 4 plays, 75 yards, 1:32; Arizona 7–6)
- (5:18) ARIZ – Tyler Loop 37-yard field goal (Drive: 5 plays, 13 yards, 1:34; Arizona 10–6)

Second quarter

- (14:53) ARIZ – Rayshon Luke 40-yard run, Tyler Loop kick (Drive: 9 plays, 85 yards, 4:07; Arizona 17–6)
- (8:07) ARIZ – Tyler Loop 40-yard field goal (Drive: 11 plays, 38 yards, 4:48; Arizona 20–6)

Third quarter

- (10:49) ARIZ – Tyler Loop 21-yard field goal (Drive: 10 plays, 71 yards, 4:11; Arizona 23–6)
- (2:57) ARIZ – Jonah Coleman 1-yard run, Tyler Loop kick (Drive: 16 plays, 60 yards, 7:11; Arizona 30–6)

Fourth quarter

- (12:37) ARIZ – DJ Williams 15-yard run, Tyler Loop kick (Drive: 1 play, 15 yards, 0:05; Arizona 37–6)
- (6:52) ARIZ – Jonah Coleman 23-yard run, Tyler Loop kick (Drive: 7 plays, 79 yards, 3:59; Arizona 44–6)

Statistics	ARIZ	WSU
First downs	26	12
Total yards	516	234
Rushing yards	37–174	22–35
Passing yards	342	199
Passing: Comp–Att–Int	34–43–0	23–33–2
Time of possession	38:39	21:21

Team	Category	Player	Statistics
Arizona	Passing	Noah Fifita	34/43, 342 yards
Arizona	Rushing	Rayshon Luke	10 carries, 71 yards, TD
Arizona	Receiving	Jonah Coleman	4 receptions, 98 yards
Washington State	Passing	Cam Ward	22/30, 192 yards, INT
Washington State	Rushing	Dylan Paine	3 carries, 23 yards
Washington State	Receiving	Nakia Watson	5 receptions, 88 yards

=== at No. 9 Oregon ===
Washington State Cougars (4-2) at No. 9 Oregon Ducks (5-1) - Game Summary

Quarter	1	2	3	4	Total
Cougars	3	10	3	8	24
No. 9 Ducks	3	14	14	7	38

at Autzen Stadium • Eugene, OR

- Date: October 21
- Game time: 12:30 p.m.
- Referee: Cravonne Barrett
- TV announcers (ABC): Bob Wischusen, Greg McElroy, Molly McGrath

Game information

First quarter

Second quarter

Third quarter

Fourth quarter

Statistics	WSU	ORE
First downs	21	20
Plays–yards	71–495	57–541
Rushes–yards	22–57	32–248
Passing yards	438	293
Passing: comp–att–int	34–49–0	18–25–0
Turnovers		
Time of possession	32:54	27:06

Team	Category	Player	Statistics
Washington State	Passing	Cam Ward	34/48, 438 yards, TD
Washington State	Rushing	Cam Ward	11 carries, 30 yards
Washington State	Receiving	Lincoln Victor	16 receptions, 161 yards
Oregon	Passing	Bo Nix	18/25, 293 yards, 2 TD
Oregon	Rushing	Bucky Irving	15 carries, 129 yards, 2 TD
Oregon	Receiving	Tez Johnson	6 receptions, 94 yards, TD

=== at Arizona State ===
Washington State Cougars (4–3) vs Arizona State Sun Devils (1–6) – Game summary

Quarter	1	2	3	4	Total
Cougars	7	14	3	3	27
Sun Devils	7	17	7	7	38

at Mountain America Stadium • Tempe, AZ

- Date: October 28, 2023
- Game time: 5:00 p.m.
- Game weather: Clear • Temperature: 83 °F (28 °C) • Wind: NE 5 mph
- Game attendance: 47,284
- Referee: John Love
- TV announcers (P12N): Roxy Bernstein, Lincoln Kennedy

Game information

First quarter

- (8:33) WSU - Cameron Ward 3-yard run, Dean Janikowski kick (Drive: 15 plays, 75 yards, 6:27; Washington State 7–0)
- (4:05) ASU – DeCarlos Brooks 13-yard run, Dario Longhetto kick (Drive: 10 plays, 75 yards, 4:28; Tied 7–7)

Second quarter

- (7:14) ASU – DeCarlos Brooks 1-yard run, Dario Longhetto kick (Drive: 7 plays, 70 yards, 4:01; Arizona State 14–7)
- (4:47) WSU – Cameron Ward 11-yard run, Dean Janikowski kick (Drive: 7 plays, 75 yards, 2:27; Tied 14–14)
- (2:15) ASU – Cam Skattebo 2-yard run, Dario Longhetto kick (Drive: 4 plays, 75 yards, 2:32; Arizona State 21–14)
- (0:42) WSU – Lincoln Victor 9-yard pass from Cameron Ward, Dean Janikowski kick (Drive: 5 plays, 75 yards, 1:33; Tied 21–21)
- (0:00) ASU – Dario Longhetto 51-yard field goal (Drive: 7 plays, 42 yards, 0:42; Arizona State 24–21)

Third quarter

- (8:26) ASU – Elijhah Badger 6-yard run, Dario Longhetto kick (Drive: 12 plays, 75 yards, 6:34; Arizona State 31–21)
- (0:00) WSU – Dean Janikowski 31-yard field goal (Drive: 10 plays, 60 yards, 3:52; Arizona State 31–24)

Fourth quarter

- (13:53) ASU – DeCarlos Brooks 8-yard run, Dario Longhetto kick (Drive: 3 plays, 75 yards, 1:07; Arizona State 38–24)
- (8:33) WSU – Dean Janikowski 34-yard field goal (Drive: 13 plays, 48 yards, 5:20; Arizona State 38–27)

Statistics	WSU	ASU
First downs	26	25
Total yards	403	509
Rushes/yards	21–88	39–235
Passing yards	315	274
Passing: Comp–Att–Int	35–50–0	19–26–0
Time of possession	29:13	30:47

Team	Category	Player	Statistics
Washington State	Passing	Cameron Ward	35/50, 315 yards, TD
Washington State	Rushing	Cameron Ward	12 carries, 35 yards, 2 TD
Washington State	Receiving	Kyle Williams	8 receptions, 77 yards
Arizona State	Passing	Trenton Bourguet	19/26, 274 yards
Arizona State	Rushing	Cam Skattebo	11 carries, 121 yards, TD
Arizona State	Receiving	Jalin Conyers	4 receptions, 90 yards

=== vs Stanford ===
Stanford Cardinal (2–6) at Washington State Cougars (4–4) – Game summary

Quarter	1	2	3	4	Total
Cardinal	0	0	7	3	10
Cougars	0	7	0	0	7

at Martin Stadium • Pullman, WA

- Date: November 4, 2023
- Game time: 6:00 p.m.
- Game weather: 0 °F (−18 °C)
- Game attendance: 24,385
- Referee: Jeff Dahle
- TV announcers (P12N): Roxy Bernstein, Michael Bumpus

Game information

First quarter

No scoring

Second quarter

- (6:18) WSU - Josh Kelly 9-yard pass from Cam Ward, Dean Janikowski kick (Drive: 9 plays, 80 yards, 3:53; WSU 7-0)

Third quarter

- (2:55) STAN - Justin Lamson 1-yard run, Joshua Karty kick (Drive: 9 plays, 80 yards, 3:25; Tied 7-7)

Fourth quarter

- (5:56) STAN - Joshu Karty 31-yard field goal (Drive: 12 plays, 61 yards, 6:00; STAN 10-7)

Statistics	STAN	WSU
First downs	18	16
Total yards	217	245
Rushes/yards	38–75	24–4
Passing yards	142	241
Passing: Comp–Att–Int	16–32–1	24–40–1
Time of possession	34:25	25:35

Team	Category	Player	Statistics
Stanford	Passing	Ashton Daniels	15–31, 115 yards, INT
Stanford	Rushing	Justin Lamson	20 carries, 54 yards, TD
Stanford	Receiving	Sam Roush	7 receptions, 61 yards
Washington State	Passing	Cam Ward	24–40, 241 yards, TD, INT
Washington State	Rushing	Djouvensky Schlenbaker	13 carries, 34 yards
Washington State	Receiving	Josh Kelly	4 receptions, 82 yards, TD

=== at California ===
Washington State Cougars (4–5) vs. California Golden Bears (3–6) - Game summary

Quarter	1	2	3	4	Total
Cougars	7	14	3	15	39
Golden Bears	14	14	0	14	42

at California Memorial Stadium • Berkeley, CA

- Date: November 11, 2023
- Game time: 1:00 p.m.
- Game attendance: 38,155
- Referee: Mark Duddy
- TV: ESPN2

Game information

First quarter

Second quarter

Third quarter

Fourth quarter

Statistics	WSU	CAL
First downs	32	16
Plays–yards	97-483	51-327
Rushes–yards	37-125	36-177
Passing yards	358	150
Passing: comp–att–int	35-60-1	14-21-0
Turnovers		
Time of possession	35:45	24:15

Team	Category	Player	Statistics
Washington State	Passing	Cam Ward	34/59, 354 yards, 3 TD, INT
Washington State	Rushing	Leo Pulalasi	11 carries, 66 yards
Washington State	Receiving	Josh Kelly	9 receptions, 130 yards, TD
California	Passing	Fernando Mendoza	14/21, 150 yards, 2 TD,
California	Rushing	Jaydn Ott	27 carries, 167 yards, TD
California	Receiving	Jeremiah Hunter	3 receptions, 45 yards

=== vs Colorado ===
Colorado Buffaloes (4–6) at Washington State Cougars (4–6) – Game summary

Quarter	1	2	3	4	Total
Buffaloes	7	0	0	7	14
Cougars	21	21	14	0	56

at Martin Stadium • Pullman, WA

- Date: November 17, 2023
- Game time: 7:30 p.m. PST
- Game weather: Sunny, 38 °F (3 °C)
- Game attendance: 27,869
- Referee: Chris Wiggins
- TV announcers (FS1): Tim Brando, Spencer Tillman

Game information

First quarter

- (8:57) WSU – Lincoln Victor 15-yard run, Dean Janikowski kick (Drive: 7 plays, 65 yards, 4:15; Washington State 7–0)
- (5:14) WSU – Brennan Jackson 40-yard fumble return, Dean Janikowski kick (Drive: 7 plays, 17 yards, 3:38; Washington State 7–0)
- (0:56) COL – Travis Hunter pass from Shedeur Sanders, Alejandro Mata kick (Drive: 3 plays, 49 yards, 0:36; Washington State 14–7)
- (0:43) WSU – Leyton Smithson 98-yard kickoff return, Dean Janikowski kick (Drive: 3 plays, 8 yards, 0:50; Washington State 21–7)

Second quarter

- (12:08) WSU – Nakia Watson 3-yard pass from Cam Ward, Dean Janikowski kick (Drive: 8 plays, 67 yards, 2:45; Washington State 28–7)
- (3:48) WSU – Cam Ward 1-yard run, Dean Janikowski kick (Drive: 10 plays, 97 yards, 4:12; Washington State 35–7)
- (0:57) WSU – Cam Ward 2-yard run, Dean Janikowski kick (Drive: 5 plays, 73 yards, 1:41; Washington State 42–7)

Third quarter

- (6:10) WSU – Kyle Williams 34-yard pass from Cam Ward, Dean Janikowski kick (Drive: 5 plays, 66 yards, 2:05; Washington State 49–7)
- (6:10) WSU – Chris Jackson fumble return, Dean Janikowski kick (Drive: 2 plays, 17 yards, 0:37; Washington State 56–7)

Fourth quarter

- (11:48) COL – Sy'veon Wilkerson 1-yard run, Alejandro Mata kick (Drive: 11 plays, 80 yards, 4:05; Washington State 56–14)

Statistics	COL	WSU
First downs	15	23
Total yards	255	469
Rushes/yards	41–91	32–127
Passing yards	164	342
Passing: Comp–Att–Int	12–27–1	20-33–0
Time of possession	29:25	30:35

Team	Category	Player	Statistics
Colorado	Passing	Shedeur Sanders	6/10, 86 yards, 1 TD
Colorado	Rushing	Sy'veon Wilkerson	13 carries, 49 yards, 1 TD
Colorado	Receiving	Travis Hunter	4 receptions, 82 yards, 1 TD
Washington State	Passing	Cam Ward	18/30, 288 yards, 2 TD
Washington State	Rushing	Nakia Watson	8 carries, 47 yards
Washington State	Receiving	Josh Kelly	6 receptions, 130 yards

=== at Washington ===
Washington State Cougars (5-6) vs. No. 4 Washington Huskies (11-0) - Game summary

Quarter	1	2	3	4	Total
Cougars	7	7	0	7	21
No. 4 Huskies	7	7	7	3	24

at Husky Stadium • Seattle, Washington

- Date: November 25
- Game time: 1:00 p.m.
- Game weather: Sunny • Temperature: 45 °F (7 °C) • Wind: NE 5 mph
- Game attendance: 71,312
- Referee: Matthew Richards
- TV announcers (FOX): Jason Benetti, Brock Huard, Allison Williams

Game information

First quarter

- (3:54) WASH - Dillon Johnson 1-yard run, Grady Gross kick (Drive: 9 plays, 51 yards, 4:59; Washington 7–0)
- (2:15) WSU – Josh Kelly 21-yard pass from Cameron Ward, Dean Janikowski kick (Drive: 5 plays, 76 yards, 1:34; Tied 7–7)

Second quarter

- (5:37) WASH – Rome Odunze 40-yard pass from Michael Penix Jr., Grady Gross kick (Drive: 3 plays, 49 yards, 1:36; Washington 14–7)
- (0:08) WSU – Kyle Williams 25-yard pass from Cameron Ward, Dean Janikowski kick (Drive: 7 plays, 59 yards, 0:57; Tied 14–14)

Third quarter

- (0:00) WASH – Rome Odunze 21-yard pass from Michael Penix Jr., Grady Gross kick (Drive: 7 plays, 67 yards, 3:49; Washington 21–14)

Fourth quarter

- (5:58) WSU – Lincoln Victor 8-yard pass from Cameron Ward, Dean Janikowski kick (Drive: 13 plays, 65 yards, 5:55; Tied 21–21)
- (0:00) WASH – Grady Gross 42-yard field goal (Drive: 12 plays, 65 yards, 1:59; Washington 24–21)

Statistics	WSU	WASH
First downs	22	17
Plays–yards	76–381	63–306
Rushes–yards	27–64	30–102
Passing yards	317	204
Passing: comp–att–int	32–49–2	18–33–1
Turnovers		
Time of possession	32:41	27:19

Team	Category	Player	Statistics
Washington State	Passing	Cameron Ward	32/48, 317 yards, 3 TD, 2 INT
Washington State	Rushing	Nakia Watson	11 carries, 64 yards
Washington State	Receiving	Josh Kelly	8 receptions, 106 yards, TD
Washington	Passing	Michael Penix Jr.	18/33, 204 yards, 2 TD, INT
Washington	Rushing	Dillon Johnson	21 carries, 82 yards, TD
Washington	Receiving	Rome Odunze	7 receptions, 120 yards, 2 TD

== Awards ==
Player	Award	Date
Ron Stone Jr.	Pac-12 Defense & Defensive Line Player of the Week	September 11, 2023
Cam Ward	Pac-12 Offensive Player of the Week	September 25, 2023

== Rankings ==
Ranking movements Legend: ██ Increase in ranking ██ Decrease in ranking — = Not ranked RV = Received votes т = Tied with team above or below
	Week															
Poll	Pre	1	2	3	4	5	6	7	8	9	10	11	12	13	14	Final
AP	—	RV	23	21	16	13	19т	RV	—	—	—	—	—	—		
Coaches	RV	RV	RV	24	17	14	19	RV	—	—	—	—	—	—		
CFP	Not released									—	—	—	—	—		Not released
