= Jake Dickert =

American football player and coach (born 1983)

Current position
- Title: Head coach
- Team: Wake Forest
- Conference: ACC
- Record: 19–5

Biographical details
- Born: August 23, 1983 (age 43); Oconomowoc, Wisconsin, U.S.

Playing career
- 2002–2006: Wisconsin–Stevens Point
- Position: Wide receiver

Coaching career (HC unless noted)
- 2007: Wisconsin–Stevens Point (GA)
- 2008: North Dakota State (GA)
- 2009–2010: North Dakota State (S)
- 2011: South Dakota (ST/DB)
- 2012: Southeast Missouri State (DB)
- 2013: Augustana (SD) (DC)
- 2014–2015: Minnesota State (DC/LB)
- 2016: South Dakota State (co-ST/S)
- 2017–2018: Wyoming (S)
- 2019: Wyoming (DC/LB)
- 2020–2021: Washington State (DC/LB)
- 2021: Washington State (interim HC)
- 2022–2024: Washington State
- 2025–present: Wake Forest

Head coaching record
- Overall: 42–25
- Bowls: 1–2

Jacob Dickert (born August 23, 1983) is an American college football coach. He is the head football coach at Wake Forest University, a position he has held since the 2025 season. Dickert served as the head football coach at Washington State University from 2021 to 2024. He played football at the University of Wisconsin–Stevens Point.

== Playing career ==
Dickert began his high school career at Oconto High School in Oconto, Wisconsin. His father, Jeffrey Dickert, was the superintendent of the Oconto School District. The family moved to Kohler, Wisconsin, for Jake's senior year after Jeffrey took the job of superintendent there, and Jake finished his high school career at Kohler High School.

The University of Wisconsin–Stevens Point, then coached by John Miech, recruited Dickert to play quarterback, where he backed up future Canadian Football League player Scott Krause. He converted to wide receiver for the 2005 season. His senior year in 2006 was interrupted by a case of appendicitis, but he returned to the playing field two weeks after surgery. Dickert's seven receptions per game that year led the Wisconsin Intercollegiate Athletic Conference (WIAC) and he was named to the second team all-conference.

== Coaching career ==
=== Early coaching career ===
Dickert graduated from Stevens Point in 2007 and joined Miech's staff as a graduate assistant for a year. He then moved to North Dakota State for the 2008 season, also as a graduate assistant. Head coach Craig Bohl promoted him to safeties' coach in 2009. He left in 2011 to become special teams coordinator at South Dakota under Ed Meierkort, in what turned out to be his last year as head coach. Dickert replaced Chuck Morrell, who had left to become the head coach at Montana Tech.

South Dakota fired Meierkort after the 2011 season. Dickert spent a year on Tony Samuel's staff at Southeast Missouri State coaching defensive backs before returning to the state of South Dakota in 2013 to become defensive coordinator at Augustana University under first-year head coach Jerry Olszewski. Under Dickert, Augustana ranked third in total defense in the Northern Sun Intercollegiate Conference, and at the end of the season Minnesota State hired him away to become defensive coordinator there.

Dickert coached the defense for the 2014 and 2015 seasons under head coach Todd Hoffner. Minnesota State compiled a 24–3 record over those two seasons, including losing the 2014 NCAA Division II Football Championship to CSU–Pueblo. After two successful seasons, Dickert departed to become safeties coach at South Dakota State under long-time head coach John Stiegelmeier and defensive coordinator Clint Brown. Dickert departed after the 2016 season to become safeties coach at the University of Wyoming. The move reunited him with Craig Bohl, now Wyoming's head coach but previously the head coach at North Dakota State from 2003 to 2013. In 2019, Wyoming promoted Dickert to defensive coordinator after Scottie Hazelton departed for the same job at Kansas State.

In 2020, Dickert received his first Power Five coaching position when he was hired as defensive coordinator by new Washington State head coach Nick Rolovich. Wyoming assistants A. J. Cooper and John Richardson accompanied Dickert in his move to Pullman.

=== Washington State ===
In October 2021, Washington State fired Rolovich and four assistant coaches, including Richardson, for refusing to comply with the state's COVID-19 vaccination mandate. Dickert then took over as acting head coach. On November 27, 2021, Washington State announced Dickert as their permanent head coach; the promotion came a day after the Cougars finished the regular season with a resounding 40–13 win over in-state rival Washington in the Apple Cup.

=== Wake Forest ===
Wake Forest hired Dickert to be their head coach in December 2024, following the resignation of Dave Clawson. Wake Forest extended Dickert's contract on November 12, 2026.

== Head coaching record ==
| Year | Team | Overall | Conference | Standing | Bowl/playoffs |
|---|---|---|---|---|---|
Washington State Cougars (Pac-12 Conference) (2021–2024)
| 2021 | Washington State | 3–3 (Note: Dickert took over as interim coach after seven games) | 3–1 | 2nd (North) | L Sun |
| 2022 | Washington State | 7–6 | 4–5 | 7th | L LA |
| 2023 | Washington State | 5–7 | 2–7 | T–9th | |
| 2024 | Washington State | 8–4 | 0–1 | 2nd | Holiday (Note: Did not coach the bowl game.) |
| Washington State: | | 23–20 | 9–14 | | |
Wake Forest Demon Deacons (Atlantic Coast Conference) (2025–present)
| 2025 | Wake Forest | 9–4 | 4–4 | T–7th | W Duke's Mayo |
| 2026 | Wake Forest | 10–1 | 7–1 | | |
| Wake Forest: | | 19–5 | 11–5 | | |
| Total: | | 42–25 | | | |
