= Kyle Williams (wide receiver, born 2002) =

American football player (born 2002)

No. 18 – New England Patriots
- Positions: Wide receiver, kickoff returner
- Roster status: Active

Personal information
- Born: November 13, 2002 (age 24); Baltimore, Maryland, U.S.
- Listed height: 5 ft 11 in (1.80 m)
- Listed weight: 190 lb (86 kg)

Career information
- High school: Santa Monica Preparatory (Santa Monica, California)
- College: UNLV (2020–2022); Washington State (2023–2024)
- NFL draft: 2025: 3rd round, 69th overall pick

Career history
- New England Patriots (2025–present)

Awards and highlights
- MW Freshman of the Year (2020)

Career NFL statistics as of Week 10, 2026
- Receptions: 17
- Receiving yards: 399
- Receiving touchdowns: 5
- Return yards: 722
- Stats at Pro Football Reference

Kyle Trevon Williams (born November 13, 2002) is an American professional football wide receiver and kickoff returner for the New England Patriots of the National Football League (NFL) He played college football for the Washington State Cougars and UNLV Rebels and he was selected by the Patriots in the third round of the 2025 NFL draft.

== Early life ==
Williams was born in Baltimore, Maryland, and grew up in Inglewood, California. He attended Hawthorne High School, Narbonne High School and finally Saint Monica Preparatory. While in high school, he played football at various positions including quarterback, defensive back, wide receiver and return specialist. As a senior in 2019, he totaled 31 receptions for 763 yards and nine touchdowns, as his team compiled a record of 7–2. He signed to play college football for the UNLV Rebels.

== College career ==
=== UNLV ===
Williams became a starter at UNLV as a freshman in 2020, being the team's leading receiver with 35 catches for 426 yards and two touchdowns. He was named second-team freshman All-American by The Athletic and the Mountain West Conference (MW) Freshman of the Year, while appearing in six games during the COVID-19-shortened season. As a sophomore in 2021, he caught 42 passes for 601 yards, placing second on the team. The following season, he caught 40 passes for 541 yards and five touchdowns, with his five receiving touchdowns leading the team.

=== Washington State ===
Williams transferred to the Washington State Cougars after his third season at UNLV. He started all 12 games in 2023 for the Cougars and totaled 61 receptions for 843 yards and six touchdowns. He returned to the Cougars for the 2024 season. He was the team's top receiver, making 70 receptions for 1,198 yards and 14 touchdowns, with his 14 touchdown receptions setting the school record. He appeared in the team's 2024 Holiday Bowl game where he caught 10 passes for 172 yards and a touchdown, setting the Holiday Bowl record for receiving yards.

Williams concluded his collegiate career having totaled 248 receptions for 3,608 yards and 29 touchdowns. He was named a fourth-team All-American by Phil Steele after the season and finished having made at least one reception in all 50 college games he appeared in. Williams was invited to the 2025 Senior Bowl.

== Professional career ==
Pre-draft measurables
Height	Weight	Arm length	Hand span	Wingspan	40-yard dash	10-yard split	20-yard split	Vertical jump	Broad jump
5 ft 10 5/8 in (1.79 m)	190 lb (86 kg)	30 1/8 in (0.77 m)	8 3/4 in (0.22 m)	6 ft 1 in (1.85 m)	4.40 s	1.55 s	2.54 s	36.5 in (0.93 m)	9 ft 11 in (3.02 m)
All values from NFL Combine

Williams was drafted by the New England Patriots in the third round, as the 69th overall selection in the 2025 NFL draft.

In Week 10 against the Tampa Bay Buccaneers, Williams scored his first NFL touchdown on a 72–yard reception from Drake Maye. The Patriots would go on to win the game 28–23. Due to a season-ending injury to Antonio Gibson, Williams began playing as a kickoff returner. He finished his rookie season with ten receptions for 209 yards and three touchdowns. Williams appeared in Super Bowl LX and had one reception for seven yards in the 29–13 loss to the Seattle Seahawks.
