= 2025 NCAA Division I FBS football season =

American college football season

2025 NCAA Division I FBS season
- Indiana quarterback Fernando Mendoza throwing a pass against Alabama during the Rose Bowl on January 1, 2026
- Number of teams: 136
- Duration: August 23 – December 13, 2025
- Preseason AP No. 1: Texas

Postseason
- Duration: December 13, 2025 – January 19, 2026
- Bowl games: 41 (Note: 41 FBS bowl games plus the College Football Playoff National Championship Game.)
- AP Poll No. 1: Indiana
- Coaches Poll No. 1: Indiana
- Heisman Trophy: Indiana quarterback Fernando Mendoza

College Football Playoff
- 2026 College Football Playoff National Championship
- Site: Hard Rock Stadium; Miami Gardens, Florida
- Champion(s): Indiana

NCAA Division I FBS football seasons
- ← 2024 2026 →

The 2025 NCAA Division I FBS football season was the 156th season of college football in the United States, the 120th season organized by the National Collegiate Athletic Association (NCAA), and the 50th of the highest level of competition, the Football Bowl Subdivision (FBS). The regular season began on August 23 and ended on December 13. The postseason began on December 13, and, aside from any all-star games that are scheduled, ended on January 19, 2026, with the College Football Playoff National Championship at Hard Rock Stadium in Miami Gardens, Florida.

The Indiana Hoosiers defeated the Miami Hurricanes by a score of 27–21 to claim their first national championship in school history. The Hoosiers became the first FBS team since the 1894 Yale Bulldogs to have a perfect 16–0 season. This was the second season of the 12-team College Football Playoff (CFP) system.

== Conference realignment ==
Two schools played their first FBS seasons in 2025; Delaware (from the Coastal Athletic Association) and Missouri State (from the Missouri Valley conference) began their transitions from Division I FCS in 2024 and joined Conference USA (CUSA) in July 2025. One formerly independent school, UMass, rejoined the Mid-American Conference (MAC) in 2025, but this time as a full member instead of football-only.

| Team | Conference in 2024 | Conference in 2025 |
|---|---|---|
| Delaware | CAA Football (FCS) | CUSA |
| Missouri State | Missouri Valley (FCS) | CUSA |
| UMass | Independent (FBS) | MAC |

The 2025 season was the last for eight FBS teams in their then-current conferences. On February 9, 2026 Both The Mountain West and North Dakota State Confirmed a deal to let the Bison in the Conference by the 2026 season.

| School | Current conference | Future conference |
|---|---|---|
| Boise State | Mountain West | Pac-12 |
| Colorado State | Mountain West | Pac-12 |
| Fresno State | Mountain West | Pac-12 |
| Louisiana Tech | CUSA | Sun Belt |
| Northern Illinois | MAC | Mountain West |
| North Dakota State | Missouri Valley (FCS) | Mountain West |
| Sacramento State | Big Sky (FCS) | MAC |
| San Diego State | Mountain West | Pac-12 |
| Texas State | Sun Belt | Pac-12 |
| Utah State | Mountain West | Pac-12 |
| UTEP | CUSA | Mountain West |

== Rule changes ==
The following playing rule changes were approved by the NCAA Playing Rules Oversight Committee on April 17, 2025:

- In an effort to reduce feigned injuries, if medical personnel have to enter the field to tend to an injured player after the ball is spotted by officials ready for play, that team will be charged a timeout (or a five-yard delay of game penalty if out of timeouts). If this occurs after the two-minute timeout (and the injury is the only reason for the clock to stop), a 10-second runoff applies if the team is out of timeouts.
- Starting with the third overtime period, teams will only be permitted one timeout to use until the game is concluded. Previously teams received a timeout for each overtime period, including the two-point attempts that begin with the third overtime.
- Eliminating media timeouts after the second overtime period, and reducing the mandatory rest periods in games without media timeouts to only after the second overtime period (instead of after the second and fourth overtimes).
- Once a decision is made on instant replay reviews, the referee will only use the terms "Overturned" and "Upheld". "Confirmed" or "Stands" will no longer be used.
- On punt formations, no player can be directly in line of the snap to a potential kicker and no player can be inside of the frame of the snapper to qualify as a legal scrimmage kick formation. If these requirements are not met, five players numbered 50–79 must be on the line of scrimmage. Also, if the snapper is on the end of a line, he loses the scrimmage kick protection and the defense can line up a player over the snapper.
- If a player on the kickoff return team gives a "T" signal with his arms, the team gives up their right to return the kickoff and the play will be whistled dead once the ball is caught or recovered.
- Enhanced rules regarding words or signals used to distract opponents trying to put the ball in play. The terms "stem" and "move" would only be permitted for defenses, and defenses cannot use cadence or sounds that simulate offensive team signals.
- Included players attempting to recover a loose ball to the list of "defenseless players".
- Contact to an offensive player in a passing posture is now considered "Roughing the Passer". If targeting occurs with this act, the roughing the passer penalty would remain even if the targeting penalty is overturned on replay.
- Added "simulating brandishing a weapon" to the list of acts considered unsportsmanlike conduct.
- Codifying the rule change from 2024's Ohio State at Oregon game, after the two-minute timeout, teams called for having 12 or more players participating in a down will be penalized five yards, and the offense would have the option to reset the game clock to the time at the start of the play. If the 12th or more player(s) were running off the field and had no influence on the play, the yardage penalty would apply but no clock reset option would be available. The clock reset option is also available without accepting the penalty.
- The Coach to Player (C2P green dot) communication technology currently used in FBS will be a permissible option for the Football Championship Subdivision (FCS). In 2026, the C2P technology will be allowed in Divisions II and III.

== Points of emphasis ==
- Continued focus on protection of defenseless players, concussions, pre-snap actions from both offense/defense, and feigning injuries.
- Focus on penalizing taunting actions by players and pre-game actions between teams that become unsportsmanlike conduct.
- Sideline control, including leaving the playing area to dispute an officiating decision.
- Illegal contact against a passer.
- Pace of play and substituting during up-tempo offenses, ensuring defenses are not at a disadvantage before the snap.

== Headlines ==
- April 25, 2025 – The University of Kentucky (UK) board of trustees approved a proposal to transfer the UK athletic program to a separate though related non-profit company known as Champions Blue, LLC. Both UK and outside media characterized the move, believed to be the first of its type by a major university, as a reaction to the then-impending settlement of the House v. NCAA legal case, which led to a formal revenue-sharing arrangement between athletic programs and student-athletes.
- July 21 – The American Athletic Conference announced a name change to the American Conference as part of a comprehensive rebranding strategy. The conference will also no longer use an initialism, opting for "American" as its short form.
- September 4 – The NCAA FBS Oversight Committee voted on major changes to the transfer portal. Under the proposal, the current 30-day period for players to enter the portal, divided into a 20-day December window and a 10-day April window, would be replaced by a single 10-day window that would run from January 2–11. This new 10-day window would apply to both undergraduate and graduate transfers. The committee also recommended that the month of December become a recruiting "dead period" during which coaches and recruits cannot meet in person, and that the signing date for new recruits change from August 1 to November 15 of a recruit's senior year in high school.
- September 17 – The NCAA Division I Administrative Committee approved the proposed single January transfer portal, but chose not to adopt the proposed January 2–11 dates. In response to feedback from FBS and FCS players, the oversight committees for both subdivisions were to discuss the dates and duration of the portal, with the Administrative Committee to set the final parameters at its scheduled October meeting. Players still competing in postseason play when the new portal closes will have a 5-day portal after their teams' final games, and the existing 30-day window for players undergoing a head coaching change will tentatively remain in place.
- September 29 – The FBS Oversight Committee recommended that the single January transfer portal be open for 15 days from January 2–16 instead of the originally proposed 10-day window. The revised recommendation also creates a 5-day window for players involved in postseason contests on or after January 12, with the window opening on the day after the team's last game. The Administrative Committee, whose next meeting was October 7–8, had to approve these changes before they took effect. The committee also discussed possible changes to the 30-day window for players undergoing a head coaching change, with continuing discussions set for its next scheduled meeting.
- October 8:
  - The Administrative Committee, which officially renamed itself the Division I Cabinet at its scheduled meeting, introduced a proposal to expand allowed logos on student-athletes' uniforms and equipment beyond those of the manufacturer. It also approved the following changes to the transfer portal, effective immediately:
    - The committee approved the previously recommended single window running from January 2–16. This only affects entry into the portal.
    - The window for players undergoing a head coaching change was modified. The window for these players will open five calendar days after the hiring or public announcement of a new head coach, and run for 15 days. Should a school not hire or announce a new head coach after 30 days from the previous coach's departure, a separate 15-day window will open on the 31st day, provided that the 31st day is on or after January 3. The opportunity for such a window will exist through June 30.
- October 12 – James Franklin was fired at Penn State after 12 seasons with the school. Franklin's contract had called for a buyout of more than $49 million, at the time the second biggest buyout in college football history, but a much lower buyout of $9 million was later negotiated when Franklin was hired for the vacancy at Virginia Tech. Franklin was 4–21 against AP top-10 opponents in his time at Penn State. Associate head coach Terry Smith served as the Nittany Lions' interim head coach for the remainder of the season.
- December 10 – Sherrone Moore was fired for cause by Michigan after 2 seasons as the head coach, due to evidence he allegedly engaged in an inapproriate relationship with a staff member. Immediately following his firing, Moore spiralled out of control, went to the house of the staff member he was alleged to have an affair with, and threatened to take both her life and his own life. He was soon arrested and charged for three crimes: felonious third-degree home invasion, stalking in a domestic relationship, and breaking and entering.

== Stadiums ==
- Sam Houston played its 2025 home games at Shell Energy Stadium in Houston during construction of a new press box at Bowers Stadium.
- The UCF Knights announced new naming rights as following the name change of FBC Mortage to Acrisure Mortgage, the FBC Mortgage Stadium was renamed to the Acrisure Bounce House.
- Following a donation of $100 million by businessman and Illinois alumnus Larry Gies to the school's athletic department, the Fighting Illini's stadium was renamed Gies Memorial Stadium in memory of his late father Larry Sr. shortly after the start of the season.
- As part of a project to better connect Rice University with the adjacent Rice Village shopping and restaurant district, the university announced that it would downsize Rice Stadium from its current capacity of about 47,000. By project completion, set for 2028, the new capacity is expected to be slightly over 30,000.
- On November 11, the University of Arizona announced a 20-year naming rights deal with the Pascua Yaqui Tribe, with the venue now being called Casino Del Sol Stadium.

== Kickoff games ==
=== Week 0 ===
The regular season began on Saturday, August 23 with five games in Week 0.

| Date | Visiting team | Home team | Site | Result | Attendance | Ref. |
|---|---|---|---|---|---|---|
| August 23 | No. 22 Iowa State | No. 17 Kansas State | Aviva Stadium • Dublin, Ireland (Aer Lingus College Football Classic) | 24–21 | 47,221 | |
| August 23 | Fresno State | Kansas | David Booth Kansas Memorial Stadium • Lawrence, Kansas | 7–31 | 41,525 | |
| August 23 | Sam Houston | Western Kentucky | Houchens Industries–L. T. Smith Stadium • Bowling Green, Kentucky | 24–41 | 15,312 | |
| August 23 | Stanford | Hawaii | Clarence T. C. Ching Athletics Complex • Honolulu, Hawaii | 20–23 | 15,124 | |
| August 23 | Idaho State | UNLV | Allegiant Stadium • Paradise, Nevada | 31–38 | 25,723 | |
^{#}Rankings from AP poll released prior to the game.

=== Week 1 ===
| Date | Visiting team | Home team | Site | Result | Attendance | Ref. |
|---|---|---|---|---|---|---|
| August 29 | Appalachian State | Charlotte | Bank of America Stadium • Charlotte, North Carolina (Duke's Mayo Classic) | 34–11 | 35,718 | |
| August 30 | Syracuse | No. 24 Tennessee | Mercedes-Benz Stadium • Atlanta, Georgia (Aflac Kickoff Game) | 26–45 | 45,918 | |
| August 31 | Virginia Tech | No. 13 South Carolina | Mercedes-Benz Stadium • Atlanta, Georgia (Aflac Kickoff Game) | 11–24 | 55,531 | |
^{#}Rankings from AP poll released prior to the game.

== Top 10 matchups ==
Rankings through Week 10 reflect the AP poll. Rankings for Week 11 and beyond list College Football Playoff Rankings first and AP poll rankings second; teams that were not ranked in the top 10 of both polls are noted.

=== Regular season ===
| Date | Visiting team | Home team | Site | Result | Attendance | Ref. |
|---|---|---|---|---|---|---|
| August 30 | No. 1 Texas | No. 3 Ohio State | Ohio Stadium • Columbus, Ohio (College GameDay, Big Noon Kickoff) | 7–14 | 107,524 | |
| August 30 | No. 9 LSU | No. 4 Clemson | Memorial Stadium • Clemson, South Carolina | 17–10 | 81,500 | |
| August 31 | No. 6 Notre Dame | No. 10 Miami (FL) | Hard Rock Stadium • Miami Gardens, Florida (rivalry) | 24–27 | 66,793 | |
| September 27 | No. 6 Oregon | No. 3 Penn State | Beaver Stadium • University Park, Pennsylvania (College GameDay) | 30–24 ^{2OT} | 111,015 | |
| October 11 | No. 7 Indiana | No. 3 Oregon | Autzen Stadium • Eugene, Oregon (College GameDay) | 30–20 | 59,625 | |
| October 18 | No. 5 Ole Miss | No. 9 Georgia | Sanford Stadium • Athens, Georgia (College GameDay) | 35–43 | 93,033 | |
| November 8 | No. 7/8 BYU | No. 8/9 Texas Tech | Jones AT&T Stadium • Lubbock, Texas (College GameDay) | 7–29 | 60,229 | |
| November 15 | No. 10/10 Texas | No. 5/5 Georgia | Sanford Stadium • Athens, Georgia (SEC Nation) | 10–35 | 93,033 | |
^{#}Rankings from AP poll and CFP released prior to the game.

=== Conference championship games ===
| Date | Visiting team | Home team | Site | Result | Attendance | Ref. |
|---|---|---|---|---|---|---|
| December 6 | No. 2/2 Indiana | No. 1/1 Ohio State | Lucas Oil Stadium • Indianapolis, Indiana (Big Ten Championship Game, Big Noon Kickoff) | 13–10 | 68,214 | |
| December 6 | No. 3/3 Georgia | No. 9/10 Alabama | Mercedes-Benz Stadium • Atlanta, Georgia (SEC Championship Game, rivalry, College GameDay, SEC Nation) | 28–7 | 77,247 | |
^{#}Rankings from AP poll and CFP released prior to the game.

=== Postseason games ===
| Date | Visiting team | Home team | Site | TV | Result | Attendance | Ref. |
|---|---|---|---|---|---|---|---|
| December 19 | No. 9/11 Alabama | No. 8/8 Oklahoma | Gaylord Family Oklahoma Memorial Stadium • Norman, Oklahoma (CFP first round, College GameDay, SEC Nation) | ABC/ESPN | 34–24 | 83,550 | |
| December 20 | No. 10/10 Miami (FL) | No. 7/7 Texas A&M | Kyle Field • College Station, Texas (CFP first round, College GameDay) | ABC/ESPN | 10–3 | 104,122 | |
| December 31 | No. 10/10 Miami (FL) | No. 2/2 Ohio State | AT&T Stadium • Arlington, Texas (Cotton Bowl Classic–CFP quarterfinal) | ESPN | 24–14 | 71,323 | |
| January 1 | No. 5/5 Oregon | No. 4/4 Texas Tech | Hard Rock Stadium • Miami Gardens, Florida (Orange Bowl–CFP quarterfinal) | ESPN | 23–0 | 65,021 | |
| January 1 | No. 9/11 Alabama | No. 1/1 Indiana | Rose Bowl • Pasadena, California (Rose Bowl–CFP quarterfinal, College Gameday) | ESPN | 3–38 | 90,278 | |
| January 1 | No. 6/6 Ole Miss | No. 3/3 Georgia | Caesars Superdome • New Orleans, Louisiana (Sugar Bowl–CFP quarterfinals) | ESPN | 39–34 | 68,371 | |
| January 8 | No. 10/10 Miami (FL) | No. 6/6 Ole Miss | State Farm Stadium • Glendale, Arizona (Fiesta Bowl–CFP semifinal, College Gameday) | ESPN | 31–27 | 67,928 | |
| January 9 | No. 5/5 Oregon | No. 1/1 Indiana | Mercedes-Benz Stadium • Atlanta, Georgia (Peach Bowl–CFP semifinal, College Gameday) | ESPN | 22–56 | 75,604 | |
| January 19 | No. 10/10 Miami (FL) | No. 1/1 Indiana | Hard Rock Stadium • Miami Gardens, Florida (CFP National Championship, College Gameday) | ESPN | 21–27 | 67,227 | |
^{#}Rankings from AP poll and CFP released prior to the game.

== FCS teams wins over FBS teams ==
Italics denotes FCS teams.

| Date | Visiting team | Home team | Site | Result | Attendance | Ref. |
|---|---|---|---|---|---|---|
| August 29 | No. 10 (FCS) Tarleton State | Army | Michie Stadium • West Point, New York | 30–27 ^{2OT} | 23,032 | |
| August 30 | Austin Peay | Middle Tennessee | Johnny "Red" Floyd Stadium • Murfreesboro, Tennessee | 34–14 | 18,505 | |
| September 6 | Bryant | UMass | Warren McGuirk Alumni Stadium • Amherst, Massachusetts | 27–26 | 3,714 | |
| September 6 | LIU | Eastern Michigan | Rynearson Stadium • Ypsilanti, Michigan | 28–23 | 15,313 | |
^{#}Rankings from AP Poll released prior to game.

== Upsets ==
This section lists unranked teams defeating AP poll-ranked teams during the season.

=== Regular season ===
| Date | Visiting team | Home team | Site | Result | Attendance | Ref. |
|---|---|---|---|---|---|---|
| August 28 | No. 25 Boise State | South Florida | Raymond James Stadium • Tampa, Florida | 7–34 | 34,707 | |
| August 30 | No. 8 Alabama | Florida State | Doak Campbell Stadium • Tallahassee, Florida | 17–31 | 67,277 | |
| September 6 | No. 12 Arizona State | Mississippi State | Davis Wade Stadium • Starkville, Mississippi (Note: Although Mississippi State is usually identified as being in Starkville, virtually all of the campus, including the stadium, lies outside the Starkville city limits, with a mailing address of Mississippi State, Mississippi.) | 20–24 | 50,808 | |
| September 6 | South Florida | No. 13 Florida | Ben Hill Griffin Stadium • Gainesville, Florida | 18–16 | 89,909 | |
| September 6 | Baylor | No. 17 SMU | Gerald J. Ford Stadium • Dallas, Texas (Note: Virtually all of the SMU campus, including the stadium, is outside the Dallas city limits in the separate city of University Park, Texas, however, all of University Park has a Dallas mailing address.) | 48–45 ^{2OT} | 34,852 | |
| September 13 | Vanderbilt | No. 11 South Carolina | Williams–Brice Stadium • Columbia, South Carolina | 31–7 | 79,873 | |
| September 13 | No. 12 Clemson | Georgia Tech | Bobby Dodd Stadium • Atlanta, Georgia (rivalry) | 21–24 | 48,059 | |
| September 26 | No. 8 Florida State | Virginia | Scott Stadium • Charlottesville, Virginia (Jefferson–Eppes Trophy) | 38–46 ^{2OT} | 50,107 | |
| September 26 | No. 24 TCU | Arizona State | Mountain America Stadium • Tempe, Arizona | 24–27 | 53,774 | |
| October 4 | No. 7 Penn State | UCLA | Rose Bowl • Pasadena, California | 37–42 | 39,256 | |
| October 4 | No. 9 Texas | Florida | Ben Hill Griffin Stadium • Gainesville, Florida (SEC Nation) | 21–29 | 90,714 | |
| October 4 | No. 14 Iowa State | Cincinnati | Nippert Stadium • Cincinnati, Ohio | 30–38 | 38,007 | |
| October 11 | No. 6 Oklahoma | Texas | Cotton Bowl • Dallas, Texas (Red River Rivalry) | 6–23 | 92,100 | |
| October 11 | No. 15 Michigan | USC | Los Angeles Memorial Coliseum • Los Angeles, California | 13–31 | 75,500 | |
| October 11 | No. 21 Arizona State | Utah | Rice–Eccles Stadium • Salt Lake City, Utah | 10–42 | 51,444 | |
| October 11 | No. 22 Iowa State | Colorado | Folsom Field • Boulder, Colorado | 17–24 | 52,698 | |
| October 11 | Pittsburgh | No. 25 Florida State | Doak Campbell Stadium • Tallahassee, Florida | 34–31 | 65,256 | |
| October 17 | Louisville | No. 2 Miami (FL) | Hard Rock Stadium • Miami Gardens, Florida (Schnellenberger Trophy) | 24–21 | 66,573 | |
| October 17 | No. 25 Nebraska | Minnesota | Huntington Bank Stadium • Minneapolis, Minnesota ($5 Bits of Broken Chair Trophy) | 6–24 | 48,549 | |
| October 18 | No. 7 Texas Tech | Arizona State | Mountain America Stadium • Tempe, Arizona | 22–26 | 54,177 | |
| October 18 | No. 22 Memphis | UAB | Protective Stadium • Birmingham, Alabama (Battle for the Bones) | 24–31 | 19,037 | |
| October 25 | No. 18 South Florida | Memphis | Simmons Bank Liberty Stadium • Memphis, Tennessee | 31–34 | 30,940 | |
| October 25 | No. 23 Illinois | Washington | Husky Stadium • Seattle, Washington | 25–42 | 68,630 | |
| October 25 | Houston | No. 24 Arizona State | Mountain America Stadium • Tempe, Arizona | 24–16 | 54,256 | |
| November 1 | No. 8 Georgia Tech | NC State | Carter–Finley Stadium • Raleigh, North Carolina | 36–48 | 56,919 | |
| November 1 | No. 10т Miami (FL) | SMU | Gerald J. Ford Stadium • Dallas, Texas | 20–26 ^{OT} | 35,074 | |
| November 1 | West Virginia | No. 22 Houston | TDECU Stadium • Houston, Texas | 45–35 | 25,049 | |
| November 7 | Tulane | No. 22 Memphis | Simmons Bank Liberty Stadium • Memphis, Tennessee | 38–32 | 30,384 | |
| November 8 | Wake Forest | No. 12 Virginia | Scott Stadium • Charlottesville, Virginia | 16–9 | 55,568 | |
| November 8 | California | No. 14 Louisville | L&N Federal Credit Union Stadium • Louisville, Kentucky | 29–26 ^{OT} | 51,381 | |
| November 8 | No. 24 Washington | Wisconsin | Camp Randall Stadium • Madison, Wisconsin | 10–13 | 71,217 | |
| November 14 | Clemson | No. 19 Louisville | L&N Federal Credit Union Stadium • Louisville, Kentucky | 20–19 | 51,234 | |
| November 15 | Arizona | No. 22 Cincinnati | Nippert Stadium • Cincinnati, Ohio | 30–24 | 37,099 | |
| November 15 | No. 25 South Florida | Navy | Navy–Marine Corps Memorial Stadium • Annapolis, Maryland | 38–41 | 34,856 | |
| November 22 | Pittsburgh | No. 15 Georgia Tech | Bobby Dodd Stadium • Atlanta, Georgia | 42–28 | 52,413 | |
| November 22 | TCU | No. 25 Houston | TDECU Stadium • Houston, Texas | 17–14 | 30,852 | |
| November 29 | No. 25 SMU | California | California Memorial Stadium • Berkeley, California | 35–38 | 28,956 | |
^{#}Rankings from AP Poll released prior to game.

=== Conference championship games ===
| Date | Visiting team | Home team | Site | Result | Attendance | Ref. |
|---|---|---|---|---|---|---|
| December 6 | Duke | No. 16 Virginia | Bank of America Stadium • Charlotte, North Carolina (ACC Championship Game) | 27–20 ^{OT} | 41,672 | |
^{#}Rankings from AP Poll released prior to game.

=== Bowl games ===
| Date | Visiting team | Home team | Site | Result | Attendance | Ref. |
|---|---|---|---|---|---|---|
| December 30 | No. 16 USC | TCU | Alamodome • San Antonio, Texas (Alamo Bowl) | 27–30 ^{OT} | 54,751 | |
| January 2, 2026 | No. 21 Arizona | SMU | Snapdragon Stadium • San Diego, California (Holiday Bowl) | 19–24 | 30,602 | |
^{#}Rankings from AP Poll released prior to game.

=== G6 teams wins over P4 teams ===
This section lists the teams from a Group of Six conferences (G6) that won against a team from a Power Four conferences (P4).

Italics denotes G6 teams.

| Date | Visiting team | Home team | Site | Result | Attendance | Ref. |
|---|---|---|---|---|---|---|
| August 23 | Stanford | Hawaii | Clarence T. C. Ching Athletics Complex • Honolulu, Hawaii | 20–23 | 15,124 | |
| August 30 | Northwestern | Tulane | Yulman Stadium • New Orleans, Louisiana | 3–23 | 22,103 | |
| September 6 | West Virginia | Ohio | Peden Stadium • Athens, Ohio | 10–17 | 26,740 | |
| September 6 | South Florida | No. 13 Florida | Ben Hill Griffin Stadium • Gainesville, Florida | 18–16 | 89,909 | |
| September 6 | Army | Kansas State | Bill Snyder Family Football Stadium • Manhattan, Kansas | 24–21 | 52,723 | |
| September 6 | UCLA | UNLV | Allegiant Stadium • Paradise, Nevada | 23–30 | 36,117 | |
| September 13 | New Mexico | UCLA | Rose Bowl • Pasadena, California | 35–10 | 31,163 | |
| September 13 | Old Dominion | Virginia Tech | Lane Stadium • Blacksburg, Virginia | 45–26 | 57,627 | |
| September 13 | Duke | Tulane | Yulman Stadium • New Orleans, Louisiana | 27–34 | 30,000 | |
| September 19 | Tulsa | Oklahoma State | Boone Pickens Stadium • Stillwater, Oklahoma (Turnpike Classic) | 19–12 | 48,842 | |
| September 20 | Arkansas | Memphis | Simmons Bank Liberty Stadium • Memphis, Tennessee | 31–32 | 39,861 | |
| September 20 | California | San Diego State | Snapdragon Stadium • San Diego, California | 0–34 | 31,369 | |
| October 18 | UConn | Boston College | Alumni Stadium • Chestnut Hill, Massachusetts | 38–23 | 38,917 | |
| November 8 | Duke | UConn | Pratt & Whitney Stadium • East Hartford, Connecticut | 34–37 | 38,106 | |
| December 24 | California | Hawaii | Clarence T. C. Ching Athletics Complex • Honolulu, Hawaii (Hawaii Bowl) | 31–35 | 15,194 | |
| December 27 | Pittsburgh | East Carolina | Navy–Marine Corps Memorial Stadium • Annapolis, Maryland (Military Bowl) | 17–23 | 17,016 | |
| January 2, 2026 | No. 22 Navy | Cincinnati | Simmons Bank Liberty Stadium • Memphis, Tennessee (Liberty Bowl) | 35–13 | 21,908 | |
^{#}Rankings from AP Poll released prior to game.

== Conference standings ==
2025 American Conference football standings
| | Conf. | | | Overall |
| Team | W | | L | W | | L |
|---|---|---|---|---|---|---|
| No. 18 Tulane y$^ | 7 | – | 1 | 11 | – | 3 |
| No. 24 North Texas y | 7 | – | 1 | 12 | – | 2 |
| No. 23 Navy | 7 | – | 1 | 11 | – | 2 |
| South Florida | 6 | – | 2 | 9 | – | 4 |
| East Carolina | 6 | – | 2 | 9 | – | 4 |
| Memphis | 4 | – | 4 | 8 | – | 5 |
| Army | 4 | – | 4 | 7 | – | 6 |
| UTSA | 4 | – | 4 | 7 | – | 6 |
| Temple | 3 | – | 5 | 5 | – | 7 |
| Florida Atlantic | 3 | – | 5 | 4 | – | 8 |
| Rice | 2 | – | 6 | 5 | – | 8 |
| UAB | 2 | – | 6 | 4 | – | 8 |
| Tulsa | 1 | – | 7 | 4 | – | 8 |
| Charlotte | 0 | – | 8 | 1 | – | 11 |
Championship: Tulane 34, North Texas 21
^ – College Football Playoff participant; $ – Conference champion; y – Championship game participant; Rankings from AP Poll

2025 Atlantic Coast Conference football standings
| | Conf. | | | Overall |
| Team | W | | L | W | | L |
|---|---|---|---|---|---|---|
| No. 16 Virginia y | 7 | – | 1 | 11 | – | 3 |
| Duke y$ | 6 | – | 2 | 9 | – | 5 |
| No. 2 Miami (FL) ^ | 6 | – | 2 | 13 | – | 3 |
| Georgia Tech | 6 | – | 2 | 9 | – | 4 |
| SMU | 6 | – | 2 | 9 | – | 4 |
| Pittsburgh | 6 | – | 2 | 8 | – | 5 |
| Louisville | 4 | – | 4 | 9 | – | 4 |
| Wake Forest | 4 | – | 4 | 9 | – | 4 |
| NC State | 4 | – | 4 | 8 | – | 5 |
| California | 4 | – | 4 | 7 | – | 6 |
| Clemson | 4 | – | 4 | 7 | – | 6 |
| Stanford | 3 | – | 5 | 4 | – | 8 |
| Florida State | 2 | – | 6 | 5 | – | 7 |
| Virginia Tech | 2 | – | 6 | 3 | – | 9 |
| North Carolina | 2 | – | 6 | 4 | – | 8 |
| Boston College | 1 | – | 7 | 2 | – | 10 |
| Syracuse | 1 | – | 7 | 3 | – | 9 |
Championship: Duke 27, Virginia 20^{OT}
^ – College Football Playoff participant; $ – Conference champion; y – Championship game participant; As of November 20, 2026; Rankings from AP Poll

2025 Big Ten Conference football standings
| | Conf. | | | Overall |
| Team | W | | L | W | | L |
|---|---|---|---|---|---|---|
| No. 1 Indiana y$#^ | 9 | – | 0 | 16 | – | 0 |
| No. 5 Ohio State y^ | 9 | – | 0 | 12 | – | 2 |
| No. 4 Oregon ^ | 8 | – | 1 | 13 | – | 2 |
| No. 21 Michigan | 7 | – | 2 | 9 | – | 4 |
| No. 20 USC | 7 | – | 2 | 9 | – | 4 |
| No. 17 Iowa | 6 | – | 3 | 9 | – | 4 |
| Illinois | 5 | – | 4 | 9 | – | 4 |
| Washington | 5 | – | 4 | 9 | – | 4 |
| Minnesota | 5 | – | 4 | 8 | – | 5 |
| Nebraska | 4 | – | 5 | 7 | – | 6 |
| Northwestern | 4 | – | 5 | 7 | – | 6 |
| Penn State | 3 | – | 6 | 7 | – | 6 |
| UCLA | 3 | – | 6 | 3 | – | 9 |
| Rutgers | 2 | – | 7 | 5 | – | 7 |
| Wisconsin | 2 | – | 7 | 4 | – | 8 |
| Maryland | 1 | – | 8 | 4 | – | 8 |
| Michigan State | 1 | – | 8 | 4 | – | 8 |
| Purdue | 0 | – | 9 | 2 | – | 10 |
Championship: Indiana 13, Ohio State 10
# – College Football Playoff champion; ^ – College Football Playoff participant; $ – Conference champion; y – Championship game participant; As of November 20, 2026; Rankings from AP Poll

2025 Big 12 Conference football standings
| | Conf. | | | Overall |
| Team | W | | L | W | | L |
|---|---|---|---|---|---|---|
| No. 7 Texas Tech y$^ | 8 | – | 1 | 12 | – | 2 |
| No. 11 BYU y | 8 | – | 1 | 12 | – | 2 |
| No. 14 Utah | 7 | – | 2 | 11 | – | 2 |
| No. 22 Houston | 6 | – | 3 | 10 | – | 3 |
| Arizona | 6 | – | 3 | 9 | – | 4 |
| Arizona State | 6 | – | 3 | 8 | – | 5 |
| No. 25 TCU | 5 | – | 4 | 9 | – | 4 |
| Iowa State | 5 | – | 4 | 8 | – | 4 |
| Cincinnati | 5 | – | 4 | 7 | – | 6 |
| Kansas State | 5 | – | 4 | 6 | – | 6 |
| Baylor | 3 | – | 6 | 5 | – | 7 |
| Kansas | 3 | – | 6 | 5 | – | 7 |
| UCF | 2 | – | 7 | 5 | – | 7 |
| West Virginia | 2 | – | 7 | 4 | – | 8 |
| Colorado | 1 | – | 8 | 3 | – | 9 |
| Oklahoma State | 0 | – | 9 | 1 | – | 11 |
Championship: Texas Tech 34, BYU 7
^ – College Football Playoff participant; $ – Conference champion; y – Championship game participant; Rankings from AP Poll

2025 Conference USA football standings
| | Conf. | | | Overall |
| Team | W | | L | W | | L |
|---|---|---|---|---|---|---|
| Kennesaw State y$ | 7 | – | 1 | 10 | – | 4 |
| Jacksonville State y | 7 | – | 1 | 9 | – | 5 |
| Western Kentucky | 6 | – | 2 | 9 | – | 4 |
| Louisiana Tech | 5 | – | 3 | 8 | – | 5 |
| FIU | 5 | – | 3 | 7 | – | 6 |
| Missouri State | 5 | – | 3 | 7 | – | 6 |
| Delaware | 4 | – | 4 | 7 | – | 6 |
| Liberty | 3 | – | 5 | 4 | – | 8 |
| New Mexico State | 2 | – | 6 | 4 | – | 8 |
| Middle Tennessee | 2 | – | 6 | 3 | – | 9 |
| Sam Houston | 1 | – | 7 | 2 | – | 10 |
| UTEP | 1 | – | 7 | 2 | – | 10 |
Championship: Kennesaw State 19, Jacksonville State 15
$ – Conference champion; y – Championship game participant

2025 Mid-American Conference football standings
| | Conf. | | | Overall |
| Team | W | | L | W | | L |
|---|---|---|---|---|---|---|
| Western Michigan y$ | 7 | – | 1 | 10 | – | 4 |
| Miami (OH) y | 6 | – | 2 | 7 | – | 7 |
| Ohio | 6 | – | 2 | 9 | – | 4 |
| Toledo | 6 | – | 2 | 8 | – | 5 |
| Central Michigan | 5 | – | 3 | 7 | – | 6 |
| Akron* | 4 | – | 4 | 5 | – | 7 |
| Buffalo | 4 | – | 4 | 5 | – | 7 |
| Kent State | 4 | – | 4 | 5 | – | 7 |
| Eastern Michigan | 3 | – | 5 | 4 | – | 8 |
| Ball State | 3 | – | 5 | 4 | – | 8 |
| Bowling Green | 2 | – | 6 | 4 | – | 8 |
| Northern Illinois | 2 | – | 6 | 3 | – | 9 |
| UMass | 0 | – | 8 | 0 | – | 12 |
Championship: Western Michigan 23, Miami (OH) 13
$ – Conference champion; y – Championship game participant; * Ineligible for postseason play due to low APR score

2025 Mountain West Conference football standings
| | Conf. | | | Overall |
| Team | W | | L | W | | L |
|---|---|---|---|---|---|---|
| Boise State y$ | 6 | – | 2 | 9 | – | 5 |
| UNLV y | 6 | – | 2 | 10 | – | 4 |
| San Diego State | 6 | – | 2 | 9 | – | 4 |
| New Mexico | 6 | – | 2 | 9 | – | 4 |
| Fresno State | 5 | – | 3 | 9 | – | 4 |
| Hawaii | 5 | – | 3 | 9 | – | 4 |
| Utah State | 4 | – | 4 | 6 | – | 7 |
| Air Force | 3 | – | 5 | 4 | – | 8 |
| Nevada | 2 | – | 6 | 3 | – | 9 |
| Wyoming | 2 | – | 6 | 4 | – | 8 |
| San Jose State | 2 | – | 6 | 3 | – | 9 |
| Colorado State | 1 | – | 7 | 2 | – | 10 |
Championship: Boise State 38, UNLV 21
$ – Conference champion; y – Championship game participant; Rankings from CFP Rankings

2025 Pac-12 Conference football standings
| | Conf. | | | Overall |
| Team | W | | L | W | | L |
|---|---|---|---|---|---|---|
| Washington State | 1 | – | 0 | 7 | – | 6 |
| Oregon State | 0 | – | 1 | 2 | – | 10 |
Rankings from CFP Rankings

2025 Southeastern Conference football standings
| | Conf. | | | Overall |
| Team | W | | L | W | | L |
|---|---|---|---|---|---|---|
| No. 9 Alabama y^ | 7 | – | 1 | 11 | – | 4 |
| No. 6 Georgia y$^ | 7 | – | 1 | 12 | – | 2 |
| No. 3 Ole Miss ^ | 7 | – | 1 | 13 | – | 2 |
| No. 8 Texas A&M ^ | 7 | – | 1 | 11 | – | 2 |
| No. 13 Oklahoma ^ | 6 | – | 2 | 10 | – | 3 |
| No. 12 Texas | 6 | – | 2 | 10 | – | 3 |
| No. 15 Vanderbilt | 6 | – | 2 | 10 | – | 3 |
| Missouri | 4 | – | 4 | 8 | – | 5 |
| Tennessee | 4 | – | 4 | 8 | – | 5 |
| LSU | 3 | – | 5 | 7 | – | 6 |
| Kentucky | 2 | – | 6 | 5 | – | 7 |
| Florida | 2 | – | 6 | 4 | – | 8 |
| Auburn | 1 | – | 7 | 5 | – | 7 |
| Mississippi State | 1 | – | 7 | 5 | – | 8 |
| South Carolina | 1 | – | 7 | 4 | – | 8 |
| Arkansas | 0 | – | 8 | 2 | – | 10 |
Championship: Georgia 28, Alabama 7
^ – College Football Playoff participant; $ – Conference champion; y – Championship game participant; Rankings from AP Poll

2025 Sun Belt Conference football standings
| | Conf. | | | Overall |
| Team | W | | L | W | | L |
|---|---|---|---|---|---|---|
East Division
| No. 19 James Madison xy$^ | 8 | – | 0 | 12 | – | 2 |
| Old Dominion | 6 | – | 2 | 10 | – | 3 |
| Coastal Carolina | 5 | – | 3 | 6 | – | 7 |
| Georgia Southern | 4 | – | 4 | 7 | – | 6 |
| Marshall | 3 | – | 5 | 5 | – | 7 |
| Appalachian State | 2 | – | 6 | 5 | – | 8 |
| Georgia State | 0 | – | 8 | 1 | – | 11 |
West Division
| Troy xy | 6 | – | 2 | 8 | – | 6 |
| Southern Miss | 5 | – | 3 | 7 | – | 6 |
| Louisiana | 5 | – | 3 | 6 | – | 7 |
| Arkansas State | 5 | – | 3 | 7 | – | 6 |
| Texas State | 3 | – | 5 | 7 | – | 6 |
| South Alabama | 3 | – | 5 | 4 | – | 8 |
| Louisiana–Monroe | 1 | – | 7 | 3 | – | 9 |
Championship: James Madison 31, Troy 14
^ – College Football Playoff participant; $ – Conference champion; x – Division champion/co-champions; y – Championship game participant; Rankings from AP Poll

2025 NCAA Division I FBS independents football records
| | Conf. | | | Overall |
| Team | W | | L | W | | L |
|---|---|---|---|---|---|---|
| No. 10 Notre Dame | | – | | 10 | – | 2 |
| UConn | | – | | 9 | – | 4 |
Rankings from AP Poll

== Rankings ==
The Top 25 from the AP and USA Today Coaches Polls

=== Preseason polls ===
AP
| Ranking | Team |
|---|---|
| 1 | Texas (25) |
| 2 | Penn State (23) |
| 3 | Ohio State (11) |
| 4 | Clemson (4) |
| 5 | Georgia (1) |
| 6 | Notre Dame |
| 7 | Oregon (1) |
| 8 | Alabama |
| 9 | LSU |
| 10 | Miami (FL) |
| 11 | Arizona State |
| 12 | Illinois |
| 13 | South Carolina |
| 14 | Michigan |
| 15 | Florida |
| 16 | SMU |
| 17 | Kansas State |
| 18 | Oklahoma |
| 19 | Texas A&M |
| 20 | Indiana |
| 21 | Ole Miss |
| 22 | Iowa State |
| 23 | Texas Tech |
| 24 | Tennessee |
| 25 | Boise State |

USA Today Coaches
| Ranking | Team |
|---|---|
| 1 | Texas (28) |
| 2 | Ohio State (20) |
| 3 | Penn State (14) |
| 4 | Georgia (3) |
| 5 | Notre Dame |
| 6 | Clemson (2) |
| 7 | Oregon |
| 8 | Alabama |
| 9 | LSU |
| 10 | Miami (FL) |
| 11 | Arizona State |
| 12 | Illinois |
| 13 | South Carolina |
| 14 | Michigan |
| 15 | Ole Miss |
| 16 | SMU |
| 17 | Florida |
| 18 | Tennessee |
| 19 | Indiana |
| 20 | Kansas State |
| 21т | Texas A&M |
| 21т | Iowa State |
| 23 | BYU |
| 24 | Texas Tech |
| 25 | Boise State |

=== CFB Playoff final rankings ===
The College Football Playoff (CFP) selection committee announced its final rankings on December 7, 2025.

The top five ranked conference champions, along with the seven highest ranked at-large teams, will be selected to compete in the College Football Playoff. The top four ranked teams will receive a first-round bye. This is a change from the 2025–26 season, when the top four ranked conference champions got a first-round bye.

This was the first time that two Group of Five teams – Tulane and James Madison – were included in the playoff.

| Rank | Team | W–L | Conference and standing | Bowl game |
|---|---|---|---|---|
| 1 | Indiana Hoosiers | 13–0 | Big Ten champions | Rose Bowl (CFP quarterfinal) |
| 2 | Ohio State Buckeyes | 12–1 | Big Ten first place (tie) | Cotton Bowl (CFP quarterfinal) |
| 3 | Georgia Bulldogs | 12–1 | SEC champions | Sugar Bowl (CFP quarterfinal) |
| 4 | Texas Tech Red Raiders | 12–1 | Big 12 champions | Orange Bowl (CFP quarterfinal) |
| 5 | Oregon Ducks | 11–1 | Big Ten third place | CFP first-round game |
| 6 | Ole Miss Rebels | 11–1 | SEC first place (tie) | CFP first-round game |
| 7 | Texas A&M Aggies | 11–1 | SEC first place (tie) | CFP first-round game |
| 8 | Oklahoma Sooners | 10–2 | SEC fifth place (tie) | CFP first-round game |
| 9 | Alabama Crimson Tide | 10–3 | SEC first place (tie) | CFP first-round game |
| 10 | Miami Hurricanes | 10–2 | ACC second place (tie) | CFP first-round game |
| 11 | Notre Dame Fighting Irish | 10–2 | Independent | Declined bowl bid |
| 12 | BYU Cougars | 11–2 | Big 12 first place (tie) | Pop-Tarts Bowl |
| 13 | Texas Longhorns | 9–3 | SEC fifth place (tie) | Citrus Bowl |
| 14 | Vanderbilt Commodores | 10–2 | SEC fifth place (tie) | ReliaQuest Bowl |
| 15 | Utah Utes | 10–2 | Big 12 third place | Las Vegas Bowl |
| 16 | USC Trojans | 9–3 | Big Ten fourth place (tie) | Alamo Bowl |
| 17 | Arizona Wildcats | 9–3 | Big 12 fourth place (tie) | Holiday Bowl |
| 18 | Michigan Wolverines | 9–3 | Big Ten fourth place (tie) | Citrus Bowl |
| 19 | Virginia Cavaliers | 10–3 | ACC first place | Gator Bowl |
| 20 | Tulane Green Wave | 11–2 | American champions | CFP first-round game |
| 21 | Houston Cougars | 9–3 | Big 12 fourth place (tie) | Texas Bowl |
| 22 | Georgia Tech Yellow Jackets | 9–3 | ACC second place (tie) | Pop-Tarts Bowl |
| 23 | Iowa Hawkeyes | 8–4 | Big Ten sixth place | ReliaQuest Bowl |
| 24 | James Madison Dukes | 12–1 | Sun Belt champions | CFP first-round game |
| 25 | North Texas Mean Green | 11–2 | American first place (tie) | New Mexico Bowl |

Unranked conference champions' bowl games
| Rank | Team | W–L | Conference and standing | Bowl game |
|---|---|---|---|---|
| – | Kennesaw State Owls | 10–4 | CUSA champions | Myrtle Beach Bowl |
| – | Western Michigan Broncos | 10–4 | MAC champions | Myrtle Beach Bowl |
| – | Boise State Broncos | 9–5 | Mountain West champions | LA Bowl |
| – | Duke Blue Devils | 8–5 | ACC champions | Sun Bowl |

=== Final rankings ===
| Rank | Associated Press | Coaches' Poll |
|---|---|---|
| 1 | Indiana (66) | Indiana (62) |
| 2 | Miami (FL) | Miami (FL) |
| 3 | Ole Miss | Ole Miss |
| 4 | Oregon | Oregon |
| 5 | Ohio State | Georgia |
| 6 | Georgia | Ohio State |
| 7 | Texas Tech | Texas Tech |
| 8 | Texas A&M | Texas A&M |
| 9 | Alabama | Alabama |
| 10 | Notre Dame | Oklahoma |
| 11 | BYU | Notre Dame |
| 12 | Texas | BYU |
| 13 | Oklahoma | Texas |
| 14 | Utah | Utah |
| 15 | Vanderbilt | Vanderbilt |
| 16 | Virginia | Virginia |
| 17 | Iowa | Iowa |
| 18 | Tulane | Tulane |
| 19 | James Madison | Houston |
| 20 | USC | James Madison |
| 21 | Michigan | USC |
| 22 | Houston | Michigan |
| 23 | Navy | Navy |
| 24 | North Texas | Georgia Tech |
| 25 | TCU | Illinois |

== Postseason ==
=== College Football Playoff ===
==== Playoff participants ====
| Team | Conference | Record | Qualification method | College Football Playoff | | |
| Team | Conference | Record | Qualification method | Appearance | Last bid | Result of last appearance |
|---|---|---|---|---|---|---|
| Alabama | Southeastern Conference | 10–3 (7–1) | At-large | 9th | 2023 | Lost to Michigan in the semifinals |
| Georgia | Southeastern Conference | 12–1 (7–1) | Conference champion | 5th | 2024 | Lost to Notre Dame in the quarterfinals |
| Indiana | Big Ten Conference | 13–0 (9–0) | Conference champion | 2nd | 2024 | Lost to Notre Dame in the first round |
| James Madison | Sun Belt Conference | 12–1 (8–0) | Conference champion | First appearance | | |
| Miami (FL) | Atlantic Coast Conference | 10–2 (6–2) | At-large | First appearance | | |
| Ohio State | Big Ten Conference | 12–1 (9–0) | At-large | 7th | 2024 | **Won National Championship** against Notre Dame |
| Oklahoma | Southeastern Conference | 10–2 (6–2) | At-large | 5th | 2019 | Lost to LSU in the semifinals |
| Ole Miss | Southeastern Conference | 11–1 (7–1) | At-large | First appearance | | |
| Oregon | Big Ten Conference | 11–1 (8–1) | At-large | 3rd | 2024 | Lost to Ohio State in the quarterfinals |
| Texas A&M | Southeastern Conference | 11–1 (7–1) | At-large | First appearance | | |
| Texas Tech | Big 12 Conference | 12–1 (8–1) | Conference champion | First appearance | | |
| Tulane | American Conference | 11–2 (7–1) | Conference champion | First appearance | | |

==== CFP bracket ====
This is the second year under the expanded College Football Playoff format. Under this format, the five highest-ranked conference champions will receive automatic bids, while the next seven highest-ranked teams will receive at-large bids. In a change starting this season, the top four seeds receive first-round byes, even if they are not conference champions.

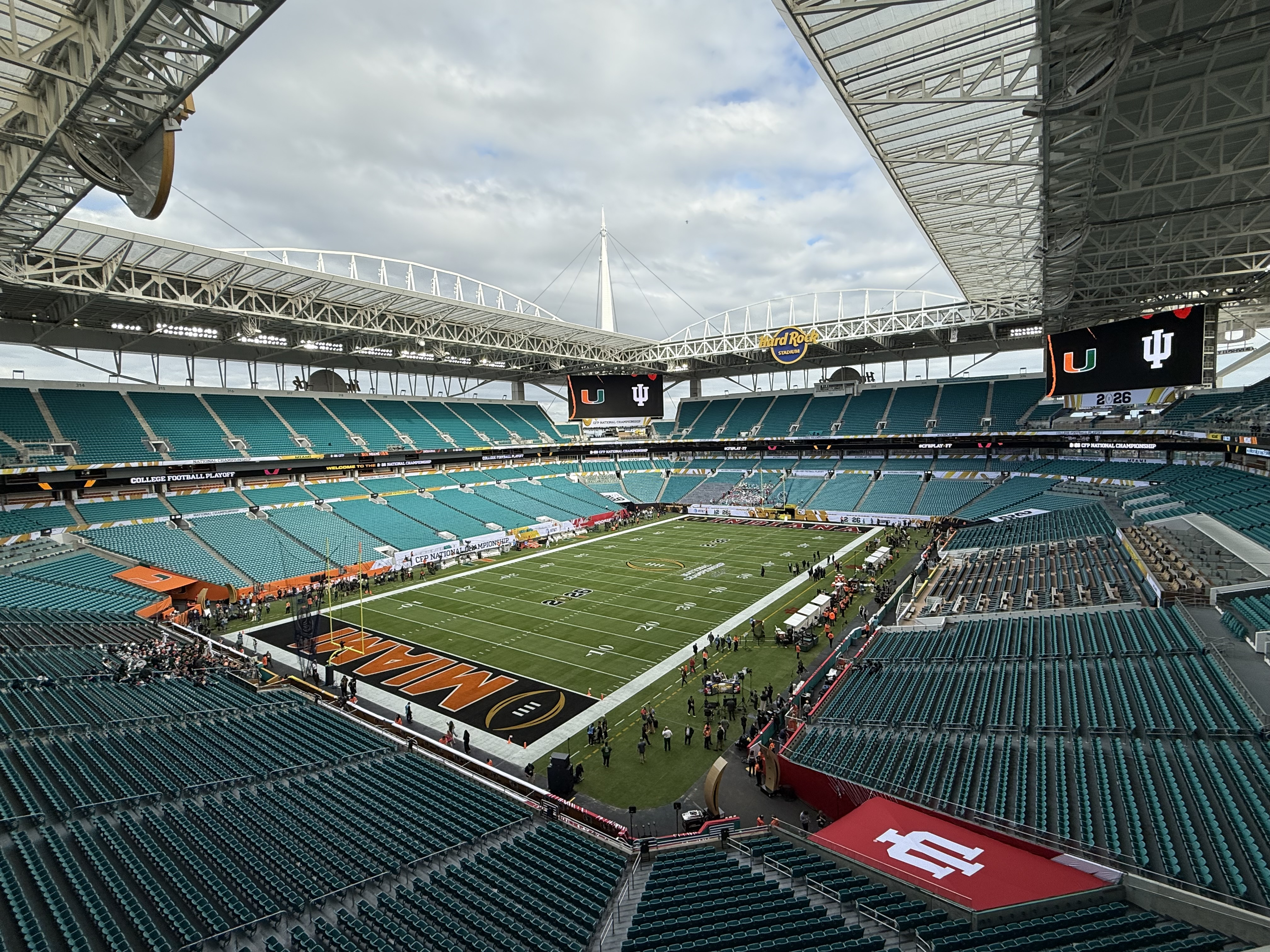
Hard Rock Stadium in Miami Gardens, Florida, hosted the College Football Playoff National Championship.

First round
Dec 20 – Autzen Stadium
**5** | **Oregon** | **51**
12 | James Madison | 34
Dec 19 – Oklahoma Memorial Stadium
8 | Oklahoma | 24
**9** | **Alabama** | **34**
Dec 20 – Vaught–Hemingway Stadium
**6** | **Ole Miss** | **41**
11 | Tulane | 10
Dec 20 – Kyle Field
7 | Texas A&M | 3
**10** | **Miami (FL)** | **10**

Quarterfinals
Jan 1 – Orange Bowl, Hard Rock Stadium
4 | Texas Tech | 0
**5** | **Oregon** | **23**
Jan 1 – Rose Bowl, Rose Bowl
**1** | **Indiana** | **38**
9 | Alabama | 3
Jan 1 – Sugar Bowl, Caesars Superdome
3 | Georgia | 34
**6** | **Ole Miss** | **39**
Dec 31 – Cotton Bowl Classic, AT&T Stadium
2 | Ohio State | 14
**10** | **Miami (FL)** | **24**

Semifinals
Jan 9 – Peach Bowl, Mercedes-Benz Stadium
5 | Oregon | 22
**1** | **Indiana** | **56**
Jan 8 – Fiesta Bowl, State Farm Stadium
6 | Ole Miss | 27
**10** | **Miami (FL)** | **31**

Championship
Jan 19 – Hard Rock Stadium
**1** | **Indiana** | **27**
10 | Miami (FL) | 21

Locations of the 12 playoff participants (teams in bold received byes to the quarterfinals)
Big Ten, SEC, ACC, Big 12, American, Sun Belt
Locations of the playoff games: campus site first round games (red), quarterfinals (orange), semifinals (yellow), and the national championship (green)

==== College Football Playoff games ====
Winners are listed in boldface.

After the completion of the regular season and conference championship games, seven teams had secured CFP berths: American champion Tulane, Big Ten champion Indiana, Big 12 champion Texas Tech, SEC champion Georgia, and Sun Belt champion James Madison, who qualified as the highest-ranked CFP non-AQ conference champion.

| Bowl Game | Date | Visitor | Home | Score | TV |
|---|---|---|---|---|---|
| Non-bowl game (First round) (Norman, OK - Campus site) | December 19 | **No. 9 Alabama** | No. 8 Oklahoma | 34−24 | ABC/ESPN |
| Non-bowl game (First round) (College Station, TX - Campus site) | December 20 | **No. 10 Miami** | No. 7 Texas A&M | 10−3 | ABC/ESPN |
| Non-bowl game (First round) (Oxford, MS - Campus site) | December 20 | (11) No. 20 Tulane | **No. 6 Ole Miss** | 10–41 | TNT/TruTV/TBS |
| Non-bowl game (First round) (Eugene, OR - Campus site) | December 20 | (12) No. 24 James Madison | **No. 5 Oregon** | 34–51 | TNT/TruTV/TBS |
| Cotton Bowl Classic (quarterfinal) (Arlington, TX) | December 31 | **No. 10 Miami** | No. 2 Ohio State | 24–14 | ESPN |
| Capital One Orange Bowl (quarterfinal) (Miami Gardens, FL) | January 1 | **No. 5 Oregon** | No. 4 Texas Tech | 23–0 | ESPN |
| Rose Bowl Game presented by Prudential (quarterfinal) (Pasadena, CA) | January 1 | No. 9 Alabama | **No. 1 Indiana** | 3–38 | ESPN |
| Allstate Sugar Bowl (quarterfinal) (New Orleans, LA) | January 1 | **No. 6 Ole Miss** | No. 3 Georgia | 39–34 | ESPN |
| Vrbo Fiesta Bowl (semifinal) (Glendale, AZ) | January 8 | **No. 10 Miami** | No. 6 Ole Miss | 31–27 | ESPN |
| Chick-fil-A Peach Bowl (semifinal) (Atlanta, GA) | January 9 | No. 5 Oregon | **No. 1 Indiana** | 22–56 | ESPN |
| College Football Playoff National Championship Game (Miami Gardens, FL) | January 19 | No. 10 Miami | **No. 1 Indiana** | 21–27 | ESPN |

=== Bowl games ===
Normally, a team is required to have a .500 minimum winning percentage during the regular season to become bowl-eligible (six wins for an 11- or 12-game schedule, and seven wins for a 13-game schedule). If there are not enough winning teams to fulfill all open bowl slots, teams with losing records may be chosen to fill available bowl slots. Additionally, on the rare occasion in which a conference champion does not meet eligibility requirements, they are usually still chosen for bowl games via tie-ins for their conference.

==== Non-CFP bowl games ====
Winners are listed in boldface.

The 2025–26 bowl game lineup had one change from the previous season: The Bahamas Bowl was replaced with the Xbox Bowl.

The bowl games that are not part of the College Football Playoff are:

| Bowl Game | Date | Visitor | Home | Score | TV |
|---|---|---|---|---|---|
| LA Bowl (Inglewood, CA) | December 13 | Boise State† | **Washington** | 10−38 | ABC |
| Salute to Veterans Bowl (Montgomery, AL) | December 16 | Troy‡ | **Jacksonville State‡** | 13–17 | ESPN |
| Cure Bowl (Orlando, FL) | December 17 | **Old Dominion** | South Florida | 24–10 | ESPN |
| 68 Ventures Bowl (Mobile, AL) | December 17 | Louisiana | **Delaware** | 13–20 | ESPN |
| Xbox Bowl (Frisco, TX) | December 18 | Missouri State | **Arkansas State** | 28–34 | ESPN2 |
| Myrtle Beach Bowl (Conway, SC) | December 19 | Kennesaw State† | **Western Michigan†** | 6–41 | ESPN |
| Gasparilla Bowl (Tampa, FL) | December 19 | Memphis | **NC State** | 7–31 | ESPN |
| Famous Idaho Potato Bowl (Boise, ID) | December 22 | **Washington State** | Utah State | 34–21 | ESPN |
| Boca Raton Bowl (Boca Raton, FL) | December 23 | Toledo | **Louisville** | 22–27 | ESPN |
| R+L Carriers New Orleans Bowl (New Orleans, LA) | December 23 | **Western Kentucky** | Southern Miss | 27–16 | ESPN |
| Frisco Bowl (Frisco, TX) | December 23 | UNLV‡ | **Ohio** | 10–17 | ESPN |
| Sheraton Hawaiʻi Bowl (Honolulu, HI) | December 24 | California | **Hawaii** | 31–35 | ESPN |
| GameAbove Sports Bowl (Detroit, MI) | December 26 | Central Michigan | **Northwestern** | 7–34 | ESPN |
| Rate Bowl (Phoenix, AZ) | December 26 | New Mexico | **Minnesota** | 17–20 ^{OT} | ESPN |
| First Responder Bowl (University Park, TX) (Note: All locations in University Park, including the venue, have a Dallas mailing address.) | December 26 | FIU | **UTSA** | 20–57 | ESPN |
| Military Bowl (Annapolis, MD) | December 27 | Pittsburgh | **East Carolina** | 17–23 | ESPN |
| Pinstripe Bowl (Bronx, NY) | December 27 | **Penn State** | Clemson | 22–10 | ABC |
| Fenway Bowl (Boston, MA) | December 27 | UConn | **Army** | 16–41 | ESPN |
| Pop-Tarts Bowl (Orlando, FL) | December 27 | No. 22 Georgia Tech | **No. 12 BYU‡** | 21–25 | ABC |
| Arizona Bowl (Tucson, AZ) | December 27 | Miami (OH)‡ | **Fresno State** | 3–18 | The CW |
| New Mexico Bowl (Albuquerque, NM) | December 27 | **No. 25 North Texas‡** | San Diego State | 49–47 | ESPN |
| Taxslayer Gator Bowl (Jacksonville, FL) | December 27 | **No. 19 Virginia‡** | Missouri | 13–7 | ABC |
| Texas Bowl (Houston, TX) | December 27 | LSU | **No. 21 Houston** | 35–38 | ESPN |
| Birmingham Bowl (Birmingham, AL) | December 29 | **Georgia Southern** | Appalachian State | 29–10 | ESPN |
| Independence Bowl (Shreveport, LA) | December 30 | Coastal Carolina | **Louisiana Tech** | 14–23 | ESPN |
| Liberty Mutual Music City Bowl (Nashville, TN) | December 30 | Tennessee | **Illinois** | 28–30 | ESPN |
| Valero Alamo Bowl (San Antonio, TX) | December 30 | No. 16 USC | **TCU** | 27–30 ^{OT} | ESPN |
| ReliaQuest Bowl (Tampa, FL) | December 31 | **No. 23 Iowa** | No. 14 Vanderbilt | 34–27 | ESPN |
| Tony the Tiger Sun Bowl (El Paso, TX) | December 31 | Arizona State | **Duke†** | 39–42 | CBS |
| Citrus Bowl (Orlando, FL) | December 31 | No. 18 Michigan | **No. 13 Texas** | 27–41 | ABC |
| SRS Distribution Las Vegas Bowl (Paradise, NV) (Note: All locations in Paradise, including the venue, have a Las Vegas mailing address.) | December 31 | Nebraska | **No. 15 Utah** | 22–44 | ESPN |
| Bell Helicopters Armed Forces Bowl (Fort Worth, TX) | January 2 | Rice | **Texas State** | 10–41 | ESPN |
| AutoZone Liberty Bowl (Memphis, TN) | January 2 | **Navy** | Cincinnati | 35–13 | ESPN |
| Duke’s Mayo Bowl (Charlotte, NC) | January 2 | **Wake Forest** | Mississippi State | 43–29 | ESPN |
| Holiday Bowl (San Diego, CA) | January 2 | No. 17 Arizona | **SMU** | 19–24 | FOX |

† - Conference Champion ‡ - At Large Bid

=== Bowl Challenge Cup standings ===
CFP bowl games are denoted in bold type. First-round CFP playoff games are included, and denoted as CFP1.

| Conference | Games | | | Record | Win% | Bowls | |
| Conference | CFP | Other | Total | Record | Win% | Won | Lost |
|---|---|---|---|---|---|---|---|
| ACC | 3 | 11 | 14 | 9–5 | .643 | **CFP1**, **Cotton**, **Fiesta**, Gasparilla, Boca Raton, Gator, Sun, Holiday, Duke's Mayo | Hawaii, Military, Pinstripe, Pop-Tarts, **Championship** |
| American | 1 | 8 | 9 | 5–4 | .556 | First Responder, Military, Fenway, New Mexico, Liberty | **CFP1**, Cure, Gasparilla, Armed Forces |
| Big 12 | 1 | 7 | 8 | 4–4 | .500 | Pop-Tarts, Texas, Alamo, Las Vegas | **Orange**, Sun, Liberty, Holiday |
| Big Ten | 7 | 9 | 16 | 11–5 | .688 | **CFP1**, **Orange**, **Rose**, **Peach**, **Championship**, LA, GameAbove Sports, Rate, Pinstripe, Music City, ReliaQuest | **Cotton**, **Peach**, Alamo, Las Vegas, Citrus |
| CUSA | —N/a | 7 | 7 | 4–3 | .571 | Salute to Veterans, 68 Ventures, New Orleans, Independence | Xbox, Myrtle Beach, First Responder |
| MAC | —N/a | 5 | 5 | 2–3 | .400 | Myrtle Beach, Frisco | Boca Raton, GameAbove Sports, Arizona |
| Mountain West | —N/a | 7 | 7 | 2–5 | .286 | Hawaii, Arizona | LA, Famous Idaho Potato, Frisco, Rate, New Mexico |
| Pac-12 | —N/a | 1 | 1 | 1–0 | 1.000 | Famous Idaho Potato | —N/a |
| SEC | 8 | 6 | 14 | 4–10 | .286 | **CFP1 × 2**, **Sugar**, Citrus | **CFP1 × 2**, **Rose**, **Sugar**, **Fiesta**, Gator, Texas, Music City, ReliaQuest, Duke's Mayo |
| Sun Belt | 1 | 9 | 10 | 4–6 | .400 | Cure, Xbox, Birmingham, Armed Forces | **CFP1**, Salute to Veterans, 68 Ventures, New Orleans, Birmingham, Independence |
| Independent | —N/a | 1 | 1 | 0–1 | .000 | —N/a | Fenway |

Notes:

- One CFP first-round game featured two SEC teams.
- The Birmingham Bowl featured two Sun Belt teams.
- The Sugar Bowl featured two SEC teams.
- The Peach Bowl featured two Big Ten teams.

=== All-star games ===
The Tropical Bowl was canceled due to "unforeseen circumstances" outside of the control of the organizers. The FCS Bowl was postponed indefinitely for similar reasons. The American Bowl was added to the all-star slate.

| Date | Time (EST) | Game | Site | Television | Participants | Results | Ref. |
|---|---|---|---|---|---|---|---|
| Jan 10 | Noon | Hula Bowl | Spec Martin Stadium; DeLand, Florida | CBS Sports Network (Note: It was reported that the Hula Bowl did not air on CBS Sports Network as had been planned.) | Team Kai; Team Aina | **Kai 38**; Aina 21 | |
| Jan 22 | 8:00 pm | The American Bowl | Victory Field; Lakeland, Florida | NFL Network | Team Warhawks; Team Guardians | **Warhawks 7** Guardians 6 | |
| Jan 27 | 7:00 pm | East–West Shrine Bowl | Ford Center at The Star; Frisco, Texas | NFL Network | West Team; East Team | **West 21**; East 17 | |
| Jan 31 | 2:30 pm | Senior Bowl | Hancock Whitney Stadium; Mobile, Alabama | NFL Network | American Team; National Team | **American 17**; National 9 | |
| Feb 21 | 4:00 pm | HBCU Legacy Bowl | Yulman Stadium; New Orleans, Louisiana | NFL Network | Team Gaither; Team Robinson | **Gaither 27**; Robinson 23 | |

The HBCU Legacy Bowl features players from historically black colleges and universities (HBCU). Most HBCU football programs compete in the Mid-Eastern Athletic Conference (MEAC) or the Southwestern Athletic Conference (SWAC), which are part of FCS.

=== Selection of teams ===
The below lists of teams are based on team records as published by the NCAA and bowl eligibility criteria.

==== Bowl-eligible teams ====
- ACC (11): California†, Clemson, Duke, Georgia Tech, Louisville, Miami (FL), NC State, Pittsburgh, SMU, Virginia, Wake Forest
- American (8): Army, East Carolina, Memphis, Navy, North Texas, South Florida, Tulane, UTSA
- Big Ten (12): Illinois, Indiana, Iowa, Michigan, Minnesota, Nebraska, Northwestern, Ohio State, Oregon†, Penn State, USC†, Washington†
- Big 12 (10): Arizona†, Arizona State†, BYU, Cincinnati, Houston, Iowa State‡, Kansas State‡, TCU, Texas Tech, Utah†
- CUSA (7): Delaware, (Note: Delaware and Missouri State were normally bowl-ineligible due to their FCS-to-FBS transitions; however, as they posted bowl-eligible records and there were not enough bowl-eligible teams, both were invited.) FIU, Jacksonville State, Kennesaw State, Louisiana Tech, Missouri State, Western Kentucky
- MAC (5): Central Michigan, Miami (OH), Ohio, Toledo, Western Michigan
- Mountain West (7): Boise State, Fresno State, Hawaii, New Mexico, San Diego State, UNLV, Utah State
- Pac-12 (1): Washington State
- SEC (10): Alabama, Georgia, Missouri, LSU, Ole Miss, Oklahoma, Tennessee, Texas, Texas A&M, Vanderbilt
- SBC (9): Arkansas State, Coastal Carolina, Georgia Southern, James Madison, Louisiana, Old Dominion, Southern Miss, Texas State, Troy
- Independent (2): Notre Dame‡, UConn

†: Former Pac-12 teams were considered for bowls with Pac-12 tie-ins instead of their current conference for 2025.

†: Iowa State, Kansas State, and Notre Dame opted out of their bowl games, but they were still bowl-eligible.

Number of postseason berths available: 82
Number of bowl-eligible teams: 82

==== Bowl-ineligible teams ====
- ACC (6): Boston College, Florida State, North Carolina, Stanford, Syracuse, Virginia Tech
- American (6): Charlotte, Florida Atlantic, Rice‡, Temple, Tulsa, UAB
- Big Ten (6): Maryland, Michigan State, Purdue, Rutgers, UCLA, Wisconsin
- Big 12 (6): Baylor, Colorado, Kansas, Oklahoma State, UCF, West Virginia
- CUSA (5): Liberty, Middle Tennessee, New Mexico State, Sam Houston, UTEP
- MAC (8): Akron, (Note: Akron was ineligible due to low APR scores. The team posted a 5–7 record for the season, and they would not have been bowl-eligible regardless.) Ball State, Bowling Green, Buffalo, Eastern Michigan, Kent State, Northern Illinois, UMass
- Mountain West (5): Air Force, Colorado State, Nevada, San Jose State, Wyoming
- Pac-12 (1): Oregon State
- SEC (6): Arkansas, Auburn, Florida, Kentucky, Mississippi State‡, South Carolina
- SBC (5): Appalachian State‡, Georgia State, Louisiana–Monroe, Marshall, South Alabama

Number of bowl-ineligible teams: 54

^{†} Appalachian State, Mississippi State, and Rice were not bowl-eligible, but they participated in a bowl game due to bowl-eligible teams opting out.

== Conference summaries ==
Rankings in this section are based on CFP rankings released prior to the games (Week 13–December 2).

Note: Clicking on a link in the Conference column will open an article about that conference's championship game, where applicable.

| Conference | Championship game | | | | Players of the year | | | | Coach of the year |
| Conference | Date | Venue (Location) | Matchup | Result | Overall/MVP | Offensive | Defensive | Special teams | Coach of the year |
|---|---|---|---|---|---|---|---|---|---|
| American | Dec 5 | Yulman Stadium (New Orleans, Louisiana) | No. 24 North Texas at No. 20 Tulane | Tulane 34–21 | —N/a | Drew Mestemaker, QB, North Texas | Landon Robinson, DL, Navy | Patrick Durkin, K, Tulane | Eric Morris, North Texas |
| CUSA | Dec 5 | AmFirst Stadium (Jacksonville, Alabama) | Kennesaw State at Jacksonville State | Kennesaw State 19–15 | Cam Cook, RB, Jacksonville State | Kejon Owens, RB, FIU | Baron Hopson, LB, Kennesaw State Jacob Fields, DB, Louisiana Tech | Cole Maynard, P, Western Kentucky | Jerry Mack, Kennesaw State |
| MW | Dec 5 | Albertsons Stadium (Boise, Idaho) | UNLV at Boise State | Boise State 38–21 | —N/a | Anthony Colandrea, QB, UNLV | Jaxton Eck, LB, New Mexico; Chris Johnson, DB, San Diego State | Kansei Matsuzawa, K, Hawai‘i | Jason Eck, New Mexico |
| Sun Belt | Dec 5 | Bridgeforth Stadium (Harrisonburg, Virginia) | Troy (West) at No. 25 James Madison (East) | James Madison 31–14 | Alonza Barnett, QB, James Madison | Colton Joseph, QB, Old Dominion | Trent Hendrick, LB, James Madison | —N/a | Bob Chesney, James Madison |
| ACC | Dec 6 | Bank of America Stadium (Charlotte, North Carolina) | No. 17 Virginia vs Duke | Duke 27–20 ^{(OT)} | Haynes King, QB, Georgia Tech | | Rueben Bain Jr., DE, Miami | —N/a | Tony Elliott, Virginia |
| Big Ten | Dec 6 | Lucas Oil Stadium (Indianapolis, Indiana) | No. 1 Ohio State vs No. 2 Indiana | Indiana 13–10 | —N/a | Fernando Mendoza, QB, Indiana | Caleb Downs, S, Ohio State | Nico Radicic, K, Indiana; Ryan Eckley, P, Michigan State; & Kaden Wetjen, RS, Iowa | Curt Cignetti, Indiana |
| Big 12 | Dec 6 | AT&T Stadium (Arlington, Texas) | No. 4 Texas Tech vs No. 11 BYU | Texas Tech 34–7 | —N/a | LJ Martin, RB, BYU | Jacob Rodriguez, LB, Texas Tech | Palmer Williams, P, Baylor | Kalani Sitake, BYU |
| MAC | Dec 6 | Ford Field (Detroit, Michigan) | Western Michigan vs Miami (OH) | Western Michigan 23–13 | Nadame Tucker, DE, Western Michigan | Broc Lowry, QB, Western Michigan | Nadame Tucker, DE, Western Michigan | Da’Realyst Clark, KOR, Kent State | Lance Taylor, Western Michigan |
| SEC | Dec 6 | Mercedes-Benz Stadium (Atlanta, Georgia) | No. 9 Alabama vs No. 3 Georgia | Georgia 28–7 | —N/a | Diego Pavia, QB, Vanderbilt | Cashius Howell, DE, Texas A&M | Tate Sandell, K, Oklahoma | Clark Lea, Vanderbilt |
| Pac-12† | —N/a | —N/a | —N/a | —N/a | —N/a | Anthony Hankerson, RB, Oregon State | Parker McKenna, LB, Washington State | Tony Freeman, PR, Washington State | —N/a |

† The Pac-12 played the season with two teams – Washington State and Oregon State – and did not have a conference champion.

=== Conference champions' bowl games ===
Four conference champions not part of the College Football Playoff.

| Conference | Champion | W–L | Rank | Bowl game |
|---|---|---|---|---|
| ACC | Duke | 8–5 | — | Sun Bowl |
| CUSA | Kennesaw State | 10–3 | — | Myrtle Beach Bowl |
| MAC | Western Michigan | 9–4 | — | Myrtle Beach Bowl |
| Mountain West | Boise State | 9–4 | — | LA Bowl |

=== At-large bowl games ===
At-Large Teams
| School | Conference | Record | Result | Bowl game |
|---|---|---|---|---|
| North Texas | American | 11–2 | L 47–49 | New Mexico Bowl |
| Virginia | ACC | 10–3 | W 13–7 | Gator Bowl |
| BYU | Big 12 | 11–2 | W 25–21 | Pop-Tarts Bowl |
| Jacksonville State | Conference USA | 8–5 | W 17–13 | Salute to Veterans Bowl |
| Miami (OH) | MAC | 7–6 | L 3–18 | Arizona Bowl |
| UNLV | Mountain West | 10–3 | L 10–17 | Frisco Bowl |
| Troy | Sun Belt | 8–5 | L 13–17 | Salute to Veterans Bowl |

== Awards and honors ==
=== Heisman Trophy voting ===
The Heisman Trophy is given to the year's most outstanding player.

| Player | School | Position | 1st | 2nd | 3rd | Total |
|---|---|---|---|---|---|---|
| Fernando Mendoza | Indiana | QB | 643 | 191 | 51 | 2,362 |
| Diego Pavia | Vanderbilt | QB | 189 | 352 | 164 | 1,435 |
| Jeremiyah Love | Notre Dame | RB | 46 | 157 | 267 | 719 |
| Julian Sayin | Ohio State | QB | 8 | 118 | 172 | 432 |
| Jacob Rodriguez | Texas Tech | LB | 17 | 56 | 132 | 295 |
| Jeremiah Smith | Ohio State | WR | 4 | 18 | 36 | 84 |
| Gunner Stockton | Georgia | QB | 3 | 6 | 22 | 31 |
| Trinidad Chambliss | Ole Miss | QB | 2 | 5 | 7 | 14 |
| Caleb Downs | Ohio State | S | 2 | 3 | 10 | 15 |
| Haynes King | Georgia Tech | QB | 2 | 1 | 10 | 13 |

=== Major award winners ===
| Award | Winner | Position | School |
|---|---|---|---|
| AP Player of the Year | Fernando Mendoza | QB | Indiana |
| Maxwell Award (college football player of the year) | Fernando Mendoza | QB | Indiana |
| Walter Camp Award (top back) | Fernando Mendoza | QB | Indiana |
| Davey O'Brien Award (quarterback) | Fernando Mendoza | QB | Indiana |
| SN Player of the Year | Diego Pavia | QB | Vanderbilt |
| Johnny Unitas Golden Arm Award (Sr. quarterback) | Diego Pavia | QB | Vanderbilt |
| Doak Walker Award (running back) | Jeremiyah Love | RB | Notre Dame |
| Fred Biletnikoff Award (wide receiver) | Makai Lemon | WR | USC |
| John Mackey Award (tight end) | Eli Stowers | TE | Vanderbilt |
| Rimington Trophy (center) | Logan Jones | C | Iowa |
| Outland Trophy (interior lineman) | Spencer Fano | OT | Utah |
| Bronko Nagurski Trophy (defensive player) | Jacob Rodriguez | LB | Texas Tech |
| Chuck Bednarik Award (defensive player) | Jacob Rodriguez | LB | Texas Tech |
| Dick Butkus Award (linebacker) | Jacob Rodriguez | LB | Texas Tech |
| Lombardi Award (top lineman) | Jacob Rodriguez | LB | Texas Tech |
| Lott Trophy (defensive impact) | Caleb Downs | S | Ohio State |
| Jim Thorpe Award (defensive back) | Caleb Downs | S | Ohio State |
| Lou Groza Award (placekicker) | Tate Sandell | PK | Oklahoma |
| Ray Guy Award (punter) | Brett Thorson | P | Georgia |
| AFCA Coach of the Year | Curt Cignetti | HC | Indiana |
| AP Coach of the Year | Curt Cignetti | HC | Indiana |
| Home Depot Coach of the Year | Curt Cignetti | HC | Indiana |
| Walter Camp Coach of the Year | Curt Cignetti | HC | Indiana |
| George Munger Award | Curt Cignetti | HC | Indiana |
| Bobby Dodd Coach of the Year | Curt Cignetti | HC | Indiana |
| Paul "Bear" Bryant Award | Curt Cignetti | HC | Indiana |
| Eddie Robinson Coach of the Year | Clark Lea | HC | Vanderbilt |
| AFCA Assistant Coach of the Year | Bryant Haines | DC | Indiana |
| Broyles Award | Bryant Haines | DC | Indiana |

==== Other major award winners ====
| Award | Winner | Position | School |
|---|---|---|---|
| Manning Award | Fernando Mendoza | QB | Indiana |
| Burlsworth Trophy (top player who began as walk-on) | Drew Mestemaker | QB | North Texas |
| Paul Hornung Award (most versatile player) | KC Concepcion | WR/RS | Texas A&M |
| Polynesian Football Player of the Year Award (top Polynesian player) | Spencer Fano | OT | Utah |
| Polynesian Football Player of the Year Award (top Polynesian player) | Makai Lemon | WR | USC |
| Jon Cornish Trophy (top Canadian player) | Antwan Raymond | RB | Rutgers |
| William V. Campbell Trophy ("academic Heisman") | Eli Stowers | TE | Vanderbilt |
| Academic All-American of the Year | Blake Horvath | QB | Navy |
| Wuerffel Trophy (humanitarian-athlete) | Michael Taaffe | S | Texas |
| Joe Moore Award | OL (Note: Starting lineup: Left tackle: Trevor Lauck; Left guard: Beau Stephens; Center: Logan Jones; Right guard: Kade Pieper; Right tackle: Gennings Dunker) | | Iowa |
| Ted Hendricks Award | Rueben Bain Jr. | DE | Miami (FL) |
| Jet Award (return specialist) | Kaden Wetjen | RS | Iowa |
| Patrick Mannelly Award (long snapper) | Beau Gardner | LS | Georgia |

=== All-Americans ===
The following players were recognized as consensus All-Americans for 2025. Unanimous selections are followed by an asterisk (*).

2025 Consensus All-Americans
| Name | Position | Year | University |
|---|---|---|---|
| Fernando Mendoza | Quarterback | Junior | Indiana |
| Ahmad Hardy | Running back | Sophomore | Missouri |
| Jeremiyah Love* | Running back | Junior | Notre Dame |
| Skyler Bell | Wide receiver | Redshirt Senior | UConn |
| Makai Lemon* | Wide receiver | Junior | USC |
| Jeremiah Smith* | Wide receiver | Sophomore | Ohio State |
| Eli Stowers* | Tight end | Senior | Vanderbilt |
| Spencer Fano* | Offensive Line | Junior | Utah |
| Logan Jones* | Offensive Line | Senior | Iowa |
| Francis Mauigoa | Offensive Line | Junior | Miami (FL) |
| Kadyn Proctor | Offensive Line | Junior | Alabama |
| Carter Smith | Offensive Line | Redshirt Junior | Indiana |
| David Bailey* | Defensive line | Senior | Texas Tech |
| Rueben Bain Jr. | Defensive line | Junior | Miami (FL) |
| Cashius Howell* | Defensive line | Redshirt Senior | Texas A&M |
| Kayden McDonald* | Defensive line | Junior | Ohio State |
| CJ Allen | Linebacker | Junior | Georgia |
| Arvell Reese | Linebacker | Junior | Ohio State |
| Jacob Rodriguez* | Linebacker | Senior | Texas Tech |
| Mansoor Delane* | Defensive back | Senior | LSU |
| Caleb Downs* | Defensive back | Junior | Ohio State |
| Bishop Fitzgerald | Defensive back | Redshirt Senior | USC |
| Leonard Moore* | Defensive back | Sophomore | Notre Dame |
| Kansei Matsuzawa | Kicker | Senior | Hawaii |
| Cole Maynard | Punter | Senior | Western Kentucky |
| KC Concepcion | All-purpose, return specialist | Junior | Texas A&M |
| Kaden Wetjen | All-purpose, return specialist | Senior | Iowa |

== Coaching changes ==
=== Preseason and in-season ===
This is restricted to coaching changes taking place on or after May 1, 2025, and will include any changes announced after a team's last regularly scheduled game before its bowl game. For coaching changes that occurred earlier in 2025, see 2024 NCAA Division I FBS end-of-season coaching changes.

| School | Outgoing Coach | Date | Reason | Contract Buyout | Replacement |
|---|---|---|---|---|---|
| Virginia Tech | Brent Pry | September 14, 2025 | Fired | $6 million | Philip Montgomery (interim) |
| UCLA | DeShaun Foster | September 14, 2025 | Fired | $5 million | Tim Skipper (interim) |
| Oklahoma State | Mike Gundy | September 23, 2025 | Fired | $15 million | Doug Meacham (interim) |
| Arkansas | Sam Pittman | September 28, 2025 | Fired | $9.8 million | Bobby Petrino (interim) |
| Oregon State | Trent Bray | October 12, 2025 | Fired | $4 million | Robb Akey (interim) |
| Penn State | James Franklin | October 12, 2025 | Fired | $9 million (Note: Franklin had originally been owed $49 million, but he and Penn State agreed to the lower buyout after he was hired by Virginia Tech.) | Terry Smith (interim) |
| UAB | Trent Dilfer | October 12, 2025 | Fired | $2.4 million | Alex Mortensen |
| Florida | Billy Napier | October 19, 2025 | Fired | $21 million | Billy Gonzales (interim) |
| Colorado State | Jay Norvell | October 19, 2025 | Fired | $1.5 million | Tyson Summers (interim) |
| LSU | Brian Kelly | October 26, 2025 | Fired | $54 million | Frank Wilson (interim) |
| Auburn | Hugh Freeze | November 2, 2025 | Fired | $15.8 million | D. J. Durkin (interim) |
| California | Justin Wilcox | November 23, 2025 | Fired | $10.9 million | Nick Rolovich (interim, bowl) |
| North Texas | Eric Morris | November 25, 2025 | Hired by Oklahoma State | N/A | Drew Svoboda (interim, bowl) |
| UConn | Jim L. Mora | November 26, 2025 | Hired by Colorado State | N/A | Gordon Sammis (interim, bowl) |
| South Florida | Alex Golesh | November 30, 2025 | Hired by Auburn | N/A | Kevin Patrick (interim, bowl) |
| Memphis | Ryan Silverfield | November 30, 2025 | Hired by Arkansas | N/A | Reggie Howard (interim, bowl) |
| Coastal Carolina | Tim Beck | November 30, 2025 | Fired | $1.7 million | Jeremiah Johnson (interim, bowl) |
| Ole Miss | Lane Kiffin | November 30, 2025 | Hired by LSU | N/A | Pete Golding |
| Washington State | Jimmy Rogers | December 5, 2025 | Hired by Iowa State | N/A | Jesse Bobbit (interim, bowl) |
| Southern Miss | Charles Huff | December 6, 2025 | Hired by Memphis | N/A | Blake Anderson |
| Toledo | Jason Candle | December 6, 2025 | Hired by UConn | N/A | Robert Weiner (interim, bowl) |
| Michigan | Sherrone Moore | December 10, 2025 | Fired | N/A | Biff Poggi (interim, bowl) |
| Missouri State | Ryan Beard | December 11, 2025 | Hired by Coastal Carolina | N/A | Nick Petrino (interim, bowl) |
| Utah | Kyle Whittingham | December 12, 2025 | Stepped down | N/A | Morgan Scalley |
| Ohio | Brian Smith | December 17, 2025 | Fired | N/A | John Hauser |

=== End of season ===
The list includes coaching changes announced during the season that will not take effect until the end of the season.

| School | Outgoing coach | Date | Reason | Replacement | Previous position |
|---|---|---|---|---|---|
| Virginia Tech | Philip Montgomery (interim) | November 17, 2025 | Permanent replacement | James Franklin | Penn State head coach |
| Oklahoma State | Doug Meacham (interim) | November 25, 2025 | Permanent replacement | Eric Morris | North Texas head coach |
| North Texas | Drew Svoboda (interim, bowl) | November 25, 2025 | Permanent replacement | Neal Brown | Texas special assistant |
| Colorado State | Tyson Summers (interim) | November 26, 2025 | Permanent replacement | Jim L. Mora | UConn head coach |
| Oregon State | Robb Akey (interim) | November 28, 2025 | Permanent replacement | JaMarcus Shephard | Alabama co-offensive coordinator |
| Stanford | Frank Reich (interim) | November 28, 2025 | Permanent replacement | Tavita Pritchard | Washington Commanders quarterbacks coach |
| Auburn | D. J. Durkin (interim) | November 30, 2025 | Permanent replacement | Alex Golesh | South Florida head coach |
| Arkansas | Bobby Petrino (interim) | November 30, 2025 | Permanent replacement | Ryan Silverfield | Memphis head coach |
| Florida | Billy Gonzales (interim) | November 30, 2025 | Permanent replacement | Jon Sumrall | Tulane head coach |
| Tulane | Jon Sumrall | November 30, 2025 | Hired by Florida | Will Hall | Tulane passing game coordinator |
| Michigan State | Jonathan Smith | November 30, 2025 | Fired | Pat Fitzgerald | Northwestern head coach (2022) |
| LSU | Frank Wilson (interim, bowl) | November 30, 2025 | Permanent replacement | Lane Kiffin | Ole Miss head coach |
| Kentucky | Mark Stoops | November 30, 2025 | Fired | Will Stein | Oregon offensive coordinator/quarterbacks coach |
| South Florida | Kevin Patrick (interim, bowl) | December 3, 2025 | Permanent replacement | Brian Hartline | Ohio State offensive coordinator/wide receivers coach |
| Kansas State | Chris Klieman | December 3, 2025 | Retired | Collin Klein | Texas A&M offensive coordinator/quarterbacks coach |
| California | Nick Rolovich (interim, bowl) | December 5, 2025 | Permanent replacement | Tosh Lupoi | Oregon defensive coordinator/linebackers coach |
| Penn State | Terry Smith (interim, bowl) | December 5, 2025 | Permanent replacement | Matt Campbell | Iowa State head coach |
| Iowa State | Matt Campbell | December 5, 2025 | Hired by Penn State | Jimmy Rogers | Washington State head coach |
| UConn | Gordon Sammis (interim, bowl) | December 6, 2025 | Permanent replacement | Jason Candle | Toledo head coach |
| UCLA | Tim Skipper (interim) | December 6, 2025 | Permanent replacement | Bob Chesney | James Madison head coach |
| James Madison | Bob Chesney | December 6, 2025 | Hired by UCLA | Billy Napier | Florida head coach |
| Memphis | Reggie Howard (interim, bowl) | December 6, 2025 | Permanent replacement | Charles Huff | Southern Miss head coach |
| Toledo | Robert Weiner (interim, bowl) | December 10, 2025 | Permanent replacement | Mike Jacobs | Mercer head coach |
| Coastal Carolina | Jeremiah Johnson (interim, bowl) | December 11, 2025 | Permanent replacement | Ryan Beard | Missouri State head coach |
| Washington State | Jesse Bobbit (interim, bowl) | December 12, 2025 | Permanent replacement | Kirby Moore | Missouri offensive coordinator |
| Missouri State | Nick Petrino (interim, bowl) | December 19, 2025 | Permanent replacement | Casey Woods | SMU offensive coordinator/tight ends coach |
| Michigan | Biff Poggi (interim, bowl) | December 26, 2025 | Permanent replacement | Kyle Whittingham | Utah head coach |
| Northern Illinois | Thomas Hammock | February 18, 2026 | Hired as RB coach by Seattle Seahawks | Rob Harley (interim) | Northern Illinois defensive coordinator |

== Television viewers and ratings ==
=== Top 10 most watched regular season games ===
All times Eastern. Rankings are from the AP Poll (before 11/4) and CFP Rankings (thereafter).

| Rank | Date | Time | Matchup | | | | Network | Viewers (millions) | Location | Significance |
|---|---|---|---|---|---|---|---|---|---|---|
| 1 | November 29, 2025 | 12:00 p.m. | No. 1 Ohio State | 27 | No. 15 Michigan | 9 | FOX | 18.42 | Michigan Stadium; Ann Arbor, MI | Rivalry, Big Noon Kickoff |
| 2 | August 30, 2025 | 12:00 p.m. | No. 1 Texas | 7 | No. 3 Ohio State | 14 | FOX | 16.62 | Ohio Stadium; Columbus, OH | College GameDay, Big Noon Kickoff |
| 3 | November 28, 2025 | 7:30 p.m. | No. 3 Texas A&M | 17 | No. 16 Texas | 27 | ABC | 13.04 | Darrell K Royal–Texas Memorial Stadium; Austin, TX | Rivalry |
| 4 | September 13, 2025 | 3:30 p.m. | No. 6 Georgia | 44 | No. 15 Tennessee | 41 | ABC | 12.58 | Neyland Stadium; Knoxville, TN | Rivalry, College GameDay |
| 5 | November 29, 2025 | 7:30 p.m. | No. 10 Alabama | 27 | Auburn | 20 | ABC | 11.31 | Jordan–Hare Stadium; Auburn, AL | Rivalry |
| 6 | August 31, 2025 | 7:30 p.m. | No. 6 Notre Dame | 24 | No. 10 Miami | 27 | ABC | 10.80 | Hard Rock Stadium; Miami Gardens, FL | Rivalry, Kickoff game (Week 1) |
| 7 | August 30, 2025 | 3:30 p.m. | No. 8 Alabama | 17 | Florida State | 31 | ABC | 10.66 | Doak Campbell Stadium; Tallahassee, FL | |
| 8 | November 15, 2025 | 3:30 p.m. | No. 11 Oklahoma | 23 | No. 4 Alabama | 21 | ABC | 10.48 | Saban Field at Bryant–Denny Stadium; Tuscaloosa, AL | |
| 9 | August 30, 2025 | 7:30 p.m. | No. 9 LSU | 17 | No. 4 Clemson | 10 | ABC | 10.45 | Memorial Stadium; Clemson, SC | Kickoff game (Week 1) |
| 10 | November 15, 2025 | 7:30 p.m. | No. 10 Texas | 10 | No. 5 Georgia | 35 | ABC | 10.43 | Sanford Stadium; Athens, GA | |

=== Conference championship games ===
All times Eastern. Rankings are from the CFP Rankings.

| Rank | Date | Time | Matchup | | | | Network | Viewers (millions) | Conference | Location |
|---|---|---|---|---|---|---|---|---|---|---|
| 1 | December 6 | 8:00 p.m. | No. 2 Indiana | 13 | No. 1 Ohio State | 10 | FOX | 18.33 | Big Ten | Lucas Oil Stadium, Indianapolis, IN |
| 2 | December 6 | 4:00 p.m. | No. 3 Georgia | 28 | No. 9 Alabama | 7 | ABC | 16.86 | SEC | Mercedes-Benz Stadium, Atlanta, GA |
| 3 | December 6 | 12:00 p.m. | No. 11 BYU | 7 | No. 4 Texas Tech | 34 | ABC | 8.99 | Big 12 | AT&T Stadium, Arlington, TX |
| 4 | December 6 | 8:00 p.m. | Duke | 27^{OT} | No. 17 Virginia | 20 | ABC | 3.88 | ACC | Bank of America Stadium, Charlotte, NC |
| 5 | December 5 | 8:00 p.m. | No. 24 North Texas | 21 | No. 20 Tulane | 34 | ABC | 2.41 | American | Yulman Stadium; New Orleans, Louisiana |
| 6 | December 5 | 8:00 p.m. | UNLV | 21 | Boise State | 38 | FOX | 1.52 | MW | Albertsons Stadium; Boise, Idaho |
| 7 | December 5 | 7:00 p.m. | Troy | 14 | No. 25 James Madison | 31 | ESPN | 1.15 | Sun Belt | Bridgeforth Stadium; Harrisonburg, Virginia |
| 8 | December 6 | 12:00 p.m. | Miami (OH) | 13 | Western Michigan | 23 | ESPN | 1.06 | MAC | Ford Field, Detroit, MI |
| 9 | December 5 | 7:00 p.m. | Kennesaw State | 19 | Jacksonville State | 15 | CBSSN | n.a. | CUSA | AmFirst Stadium; Jacksonville, Alabama |

=== Most watched non-CFP bowl games ===
All times Eastern. Rankings are from the CFP Rankings.

| Rank | Date | Time | Matchup | Network | Viewers (millions) | Game | Location |

=== College Football Playoff games ===
| Rank | Date | Time | Matchup | | | | Network | Viewers (millions) | Game | Location |
|---|---|---|---|---|---|---|---|---|---|---|
| 1 | January 19 | 7:30 pm (ET) | No. 10 Miami | 21 | No. 1 Indiana | 27 | ESPN | 30.1 | College Football Playoff National Championship | Hard Rock Stadium; Miami Gardens, Florida |
| 2 | January 1 | 5:00 pm (ET) | No. 9 Alabama | 3 | No. 1 Indiana | 38 | ESPN | 23.90 | Rose Bowl (Quarterfinals) | Rose Bowl; Pasadena, California |
| 3 | December 31 | 7:30 pm (ET) | No. 10 Miami | 24 | No. 2 Ohio State | 14 | ESPN | 19.02 | Cotton Bowl Classic (Quarterfinals) | AT&T Stadium; Arlington, Texas |
| 4 | January 1 | 4:00 pm (ET) | No. 6 Ole Miss | 39 | No. 3 Georgia | 34 | ESPN | 18.66 | Sugar Bowl (Quarterfinals) | Caesars Superdome; New Orleans, Louisiana |
| 5 | January 9 | 7:30 pm (ET) | No. 5 Oregon | 22 | No. 1 Indiana | 56 | ESPN | 18.0 | Peach Bowl (Semifinals) | Mercedes-Benz Stadium; Atlanta, Georgia |
| 6 | January 1 | 1:00 pm (ET) | No. 5 Oregon | 23 | No. 4 Texas Tech | 0 | ESPN | 15.90 | Orange Bowl (Quarterfinals) | Hard Rock Stadium; Miami Gardens, Florida |
| 7 | January 8 | 7:30 pm (ET) | No. 10 Miami | 31 | No. 6 Ole Miss | 27 | ESPN | 15.8 | Fiesta Bowl (Semifinals) | State Farm Stadium; Glendale, Arizona |
| 8 | December 19 | 8:00 pm (ET) | No. 9 Alabama | 34 | No. 8 Oklahoma | 24 | ABC/ESPN | 14.94 | Non-bowl game (First round) | Gaylord Family Oklahoma Memorial Stadium; Norman, OK (Campus site) |
| 9 | December 20 | 12:00 pm (ET) | No. 10 Miami | 10 | No. 7 Texas A&M | 3 | ABC/ESPN | 14.72 | Non-bowl game (First round) | Kyle Field; College Station, TX (Campus site) |
| 10 | December 20 | 4:00 pm (ET) | No. 20 Tulane | 10 | No. 6 Ole Miss | 41 | TNT | 6.20 | Non-bowl game (First round) | Vaught-Hemingway Stadium; Oxford, MS (Campus site) |
| 11 | December 20 | 8:00 pm (ET) | No. 24 James Madison | 34 | No. 5 Oregon | 51 | TNT | 4.36 | Non-bowl game (First round) | Autzen Stadium; Eugene, OR (Campus site) |

== Television changes ==
This is the first season of a new television contract for the Big 12 Conference with ESPN, Fox Sports and TNT Sports. ESPN holds the rights to the top four college football games per season, and twelve of the top twenty games, along with the Big 12 Championship Game on ABC. TNT Sports sublicenses thirteen games from ESPN.

The Pac-12 Conference renewed their media partnership with The CW for the 2025 season, while also agreeing to two-game deals with ESPN and CBS Sports. While The CW will continue to carry majority of the home games for Oregon State and Washington State, ESPN will carry two Oregon State home games and CBS will carry one home game from each school in primetime.

This is the final year of the Mountain West Conference's broadcast agreement with Fox Sports and CBS Sports. The conference has not yet announced a new agreement. Despite being announced as a multi-year deal, the Mountain West did not continue an agreement with TNT Sports from 2024 to air 14 games on TruTV.

== Attendances ==
| # | Team | Average |
|---|---|---|
| 1 | Michigan | 110,842 |
| 2 | Penn State | 107,093 |
| 3 | Texas A&M | 106,159 |
| 4 | Ohio State | 104,105 |
| 5 | Texas | 102,367 |
| 6 | Tennessee | 101,915 |
| 7 | LSU | 101,575 |
| 8 | Alabama | 100,077 |
| 9 | Georgia | 93,033 |
| 10 | Florida | 90,125 |
| 11 | Auburn | 88,043 |
| 12 | Nebraska | 86,549 |
| 13 | Oklahoma | 83,532 |
| 14 | South Carolina | 79,334 |
| 15 | Clemson | 79,142 |
| 16 | Notre Dame | 77,622 |
| 17 | Wisconsin | 70,403 |
| 18 | Michigan State | 70,389 |
| 19 | Arkansas | 69,762 |
| 20 | Iowa | 69,250 |
| 21 | Washington | 68,238 |
| 22 | USC | 67,783 |
| 23 | Ole Miss | 66,772 |
| 24 | Florida State | 65,876 |
| 25 | Miami Hurricanes | 63,834 |
| 26 | BYU | 63,789 |
| 27 | Iowa State | 60,862 |
| 28 | Texas Tech | 60,143 |
| 29 | Virginia Tech | 59,946 |
| 30 | Oregon | 58,582 |
| 31 | Illinois | 58,350 |
| 32 | Kentucky | 57,779 |
| 33 | Missouri | 57,321 |
| 34 | NC State | 56,919 |
| 35 | Purdue | 56,581 |
| 36 | West Virginia | 54,506 |
| 37 | Arizona State | 54,444 |
| 38 | Mississippi State | 53,186 |
| 39 | Pittsburgh | 51,845 |
| 40 | Kansas State | 51,773 |
| 41 | Utah | 51,701 |
| 42 | Indiana | 51,184 |
| 43 | North Carolina | 50,500 |
| 44 | Colorado | 50,469 |
| 45 | Louisville | 50,292 |
| 46 | Virginia | 48,776 |
| 47 | Rutgers | 48,459 |
| 48 | Georgia Tech | 47,694 |
| 49 | Minnesota | 46,519 |
| 50 | Oklahoma State | 44,664 |
| 51 | UCF | 43,409 |
| 52 | TCU | 43,319 |
| 53 | Arizona | 41,782 |
| 54 | Boston College | 41,090 |
| 55 | Maryland | 40,765 |
| 56 | Kansas | 39,478 |
| 57 | Baylor | 39,447 |
| 58 | Syracuse | 38,605 |
| 59 | Fresno State | 38,030 |
| 60 | UCLA | 37,282 |
| 61 | East Carolina | 37,097 |
| 62 | Cincinnati | 36,052 |
| 63 | California | 34,991 |
| 64 | Vanderbilt | 34,813 |
| 65 | SMU | 33,530 |
| 66 | South Florida | 33,194 |
| 67 | Boise State | 32,891 |
| 68 | Houston | 32,215 |
| 69 | Navy | 31,960 |
| 70 | Colorado State | 31,901 |
| 71 | Appalachian State | 31,813 |
| 72 | UNLV | 31,589 |
| 73 | UConn | 30,444 |
| 74 | Oregon State | 30,145 |
| 75 | Memphis | 30,097 |
| 76 | Wake Forest | 29,433 |
| 77 | Army | 28,390 |
| 78 | Stanford | 28,171 |
| 79 | Southern Miss | 27,912 |
| 80 | Air Force | 26,665 |
| 81 | Washington State | 26,527 |
| 82 | San Diego State | 26,189 |
| 83 | Marshall | 25,298 |
| 84 | New Mexico | 25,252 |
| 85 | James Madison | 25,135 |
| 86 | North Texas | 24,493 |
| 87 | UTSA | 24,361 |
| 88 | Duke | 24,283 |
| 89 | Tulane | 24,068 |
| 90 | Troy | 24,053 |
| 91 | Wyoming | 23,433 |
| 92 | Rice | 23,423 |
| 93 | Georgia Southern | 22,541 |
| 94 | Toledo | 21,199 |
| 95 | Ohio | 21,007 |
| 96 | Western Michigan | 20,194 |
| 97 | Jacksonville State | 19,993 |
| 98 | Louisiana | 19,982 |
| 99 | UAB | 19,702 |
| 100 | Utah State | 18,855 |
| 101 | Old Dominion | 18,583 |
| 102 | Texas State | 18,565 |
| 103 | Bowling Green | 18,556 |
| 104 | Liberty | 18,371 |
| 105 | Coastal Carolina | 18,352 |
| 106 | Nevada | 17,875 |
| 107 | FAU | 17,667 |
| 108 | Temple | 17,566 |
| 109 | Louisiana–Monroe | 17,486 |
| 110 | South Alabama | 17,273 |
| 111 | Arkansas State | 16,964 |
| 112 | Delaware | 16,751 |
| 113 | Tulsa | 16,369 |
| 114 | Central Michigan | 16,277 |
| 115 | UTEP | 15,818 |
| 116 | Georgia State | 15,500 |
| 117 | Eastern Michigan | 14,842 |
| 118 | Western Kentucky | 14,772 |
| 119 | San Jose State | 13,997 |
| 120 | FIU | 13,864 |
| 121 | Buffalo | 13,808 |
| 122 | Hawaii | 13,708 |
| 123 | Louisiana Tech | 13,682 |
| 124 | Charlotte | 13,564 |
| 125 | Middle Tennessee | 12,252 |
| 126 | Miami RedHawks | 11,658 |
| 127 | Northwestern | 11,548 |
| 128 | Missouri State | 11,547 |
| 129 | Kennesaw State | 10,743 |
| 130 | Kent State | 9,875 |
| 131 | New Mexico State | 9,505 |
| 132 | Northern Illinois | 9,309 |
| 133 | Ball State | 8,968 |
| 134 | UMass | 8,789 |
| 135 | Akron | 7,729 |
| 136 | Sam Houston | 4,773 |

== See also ==
- 2025 NCAA Division I FCS football season
- 2025 NCAA Division II football season
- 2025 NCAA Division III football season
- 2025 NAIA football season
- 2025 U Sports football season
