= Nadame Tucker =

American football player (born 2000)

No. 60 – Cleveland Browns
- Position: Defensive end
- Roster status: Practice squad

Personal information
- Born: June 21, 2000 (age 26)
- Listed height: 6 ft 2 in (1.88 m)
- Listed weight: 247 lb (112 kg)

Career information
- High school: Teaneck (Teaneck, New Jersey)
- College: Independence (2020); Hutchinson (2021); Houston (2022–2024); Western Michigan (2025)
- NFL draft: 2026: undrafted

Career history
- Los Angeles Chargers (2026)*; Cleveland Browns (2026–present)*
- * Offseason or practice squad member only

Awards and highlights
- Third-team All-American (2025); MAC Defensive Player of the Year (2025)
- Stats at Pro Football Reference

Nadame Latrell Tucker (born June 21, 2000) is an American professional football defensive end for the Cleveland Browns of the National Football League (NFL). He played college football for the Houston Cougars and Western Michigan Broncos.

Tucker finished the 2025 college football season tied with David Bailey of the Texas Tech Red Raiders for the most sacks in the FBS, with 14.5.

== Early life ==
Tucker attended Teaneck High School in Teaneck, New Jersey. He played basketball in high school and did not start playing football until his senior year.

== College career ==
Tucker played 2020 at Independence Community College, recording 12 tackles, two sacks and an interception. He originally committed to play at the University of South Alabama in 2021 but instead played at Hutchinson Community College. In 11 games, Tucker had 50 tackles with 12 sacks and was named the Defensive MVP of the Salt City Bowl. After the season, he transferred to the University of Houston. In three seasons at Houston, he played in only 13 games and had 10 tackles. After the 2024 season, Tucker entered the transfer portal and transferred to Western Michigan University. At Western Michigan in 2025, he was the MAC Defensive Player of the Year and a second-team All-American after recording 55 tackles and 14.5 sacks.

== Professional career ==
Pre-draft measurables
Height	Weight	Arm length	Hand span	Wingspan	40-yard dash	10-yard split	20-yard split	20-yard shuttle	Three-cone drill	Vertical jump	Broad jump	Bench press
6 ft 1 7/8 in (1.88 m)	247 lb (112 kg)	31 3/8 in (0.80 m)	9 in (0.23 m)	6 ft 6 1/4 in (1.99 m)	4.73 s	1.63 s	2.74 s	4.68 s	7.44 s	33.5 in (0.85 m)	9 ft 11 in (3.02 m)	22 reps
All values from NFL Combine/Pro Day

=== Los Angeles Chargers ===
After the 2026 NFL draft, Tucker signed with the Los Angeles Chargers as an undrafted free agent. Tucker was waived by Los Angeles as a part of final roster cuts on August 30, 2026; he was re-signed to the team's practice squad the following day. He was released by the Chargers on September 3.

=== Cleveland Browns ===
On September 8, 2026, Tucker signed with the Cleveland Browns' practice squad. He was released on October 21 and was re-signed to the practice squad six days later.
