= Bronko Nagurski Trophy =

Award to the best defensive player in US college football

- Awarded for: The best defensive player in college football
- Country: United States
- Presented by: Charlotte Touchdown Club and Football Writers Association of America

History
- First award: 1993
- Most recent: Texas Tech linebacker Jacob Rodriguez
- Website: www.touchdownclub.com

The Bronko Nagurski Trophy has been awarded annually since 1993 to the collegiate American football defensive player adjudged by the membership of the Football Writers Association of America (FWAA) to be the best in the National Collegiate Athletic Association (NCAA). The award is named for Bronko Nagurski, who played football for the University of Minnesota and Chicago Bears, and is presented by the Charlotte Touchdown Club and FWAA.

== Winners ==
Year	Winner	Pos.	School	Ref
1993	Rob Waldrop	DT	Arizona	
1994	Warren Sapp	DT	Miami (FL)	
1995	Pat Fitzgerald	LB	Northwestern	
1996	Pat Fitzgerald (2)	LB	Northwestern (2)	
1997	Charles Woodson	CB	Michigan	
1998	Champ Bailey	CB	Georgia	
1999	Corey Moore	DE	Virginia Tech	
2000	Dan Morgan	LB	Miami (FL) (2)	
2001	Roy Williams	SS	Oklahoma	
2002	Terrell Suggs	DE	Arizona State	
2003	Derrick Strait	CB	Oklahoma (2)	
2004	Derrick Johnson	LB	Texas	
2005	Elvis Dumervil	DE	Louisville	
2006	James Laurinaitis	LB	Ohio State	
2007	Glenn Dorsey	DT	LSU	
2008	Brian Orakpo	DE	Texas (2)	
2009	Ndamukong Suh	DT	Nebraska	
2010	Da'Quan Bowers	DE	Clemson	
2011	Luke Kuechly	LB	Boston College	
2012	Manti Teʻo	LB	Notre Dame	
2013	Aaron Donald	DT	Pittsburgh	
2014	Scooby Wright	LB	Arizona (2)	
2015	Tyler Matakevich	LB	Temple	
2016	Jonathan Allen	DE	Alabama	
2017	Bradley Chubb	DE	NC State	
2018	Josh Allen	LB	Kentucky	
2019	Chase Young	DE	Ohio State (2)	
2020	Zaven Collins	LB	Tulsa	
2021	Will Anderson Jr.	LB	Alabama (2)	
2022	Will Anderson Jr. (2)	LB	Alabama (3)	
2023	Xavier Watts	S	Notre Dame (2)	
2024	Kyle Kennard	DE	South Carolina	
2025	Jacob Rodriguez	LB	Texas Tech	

== See also ==
- Chuck Bednarik Award, a similar award given by the Maxwell Football Club
