= David Bailey (American football) =

American football player (born 2003)

No. 31 – New York Jets
- Position: Defensive end
- Roster status: Active

Personal information
- Born: August 28, 2003 (age 23); Orange, California, U.S.
- Listed height: 6 ft 3 in (1.91 m)
- Listed weight: 251 lb (114 kg)

Career information
- High school: Mater Dei (Santa Ana, California)
- College: Stanford (2022–2024); Texas Tech (2025)
- NFL draft: 2026: 1st round, 2nd overall pick

Career history
- New York Jets (2026–present)

Awards and highlights
- Unanimous All-American (2025); Big 12 Defensive Lineman of the Year (2025)

Career NFL statistics as of Week 10, 2026
- Tackles: 45
- Sacks: 7.5
- Forced fumbles: 5
- Pass deflections: 3
- Stats at Pro Football Reference

David Bailey (born August 28, 2003) is an American professional football defensive end for the New York Jets of the National Football League (NFL). Bailey played college football for the Stanford Cardinal and Texas Tech Red Raiders and was selected by the Jets second overall in the 2026 NFL draft.

== Early life ==
Bailey was raised in Orange County, California, the son of Anthony Bailey, an immigrant from Jamaica, and Monica Bailey, an immigrant from Ghana. He has three siblings, including an older brother, DJ, who played defensive end at Harvard.

Bailey attended Mater Dei High School in Santa Ana, California. As a senior in 2021, he had 54 tackles and 15.5 sacks and was named The Orange County Register' Orange County defensive player of the year. He played in the 2022 All-American Bowl. Bailey committed to Stanford University to play college football.

== College career ==
=== Stanford ===
Bailey entered his true freshman year at Stanford in 2022 as a starter. He played in 11 games with nine starts and had 46 tackles and 2.5 sacks. He was named to 247Sports' true freshman All-American team. He returned to Stanford as a starter his sophomore year in 2023. In the season opener against the Hawaii Rainbow Warriors, Bailey recorded six tackles, four tackles for loss, and three sacks to help lead Stanford to a 37-24 win. He played in 10 games and finished with 34 tackles and five sacks. In his junior year, he played in all 12 games and finished with 31 tackles and seven sacks.

=== Texas Tech ===
On April 4, 2025, Bailey announced that he would transfer to Texas Tech. He ended the 2025 college football season tied with Nadame Tucker of the Western Michigan Broncos for the most sacks in the FBS, with 14.5. His 2025 season put him second in Texas Tech history for sacks in a season finishing half a sack behind Brandon Sharpe. He was named a unanimous All-American along with teammate Jacob Rodriguez. He was also named as the Big 12 Defensive Lineman of the Year and Big 12 Defensive Newcomer of the Year.

== Professional career ==
Pre-draft measurables
Height	Weight	Arm length	Hand span	Wingspan	40-yard dash	10-yard split	20-yard split	Vertical jump	Broad jump
6 ft 3 5/8 in (1.92 m)	251 lb (114 kg)	33 3/4 in (0.86 m)	10 1/4 in (0.26 m)	6 ft 7 3/4 in (2.03 m)	4.50 s	1.62 s	2.67 s	35.0 in (0.89 m)	10 ft 9 in (3.28 m)
All values from NFL Combine

Bailey was selected by the New York Jets in the first round, second overall, of the 2026 NFL draft. On May 8, 2026, Bailey signed a four-year contract with the Jets worth $54.6 million, which featured a $36.8 million signing bonus. In Week 5 against the Cleveland Browns, Bailey posted three sacks, seven tackles, three tackles for loss and four QB hits, earning him AFC Defensive Player of the Week.

== Career statistics ==
Legend
	Led NCAA Division I FBS
**Bold**	Career high

=== NFL ===
Season	Team	Games		Tackles							Fumbles				Interceptions					
Season	Team	GP	GS	Cmb	Solo	Ast	Sck	Sfty	TFL	Prss	FF	FR	Yds	TD	PD	Int	Yds	Avg	Lng	TD
2026	NYJ	9	9	45	26	19	7.5	0	10	17	5	0	0	0	3	0	0	0.0	0	0
Career		9	9	45	26	19	7.5	0	10	17	5	0	0	0	3	0	0	0.0	0	0

=== College ===
Season	Team	GP	Tackles					Fumbles			
Season	Team	GP	Cmb	Solo	Ast	TFL	Sck	PD	FF	FR	TD
2022	Stanford	10	46	29	17	8.5	2.5	0	2	0	0
2023	Stanford	10	34	22	12	6.0	5.0	0	0	0	0
2024	Stanford	12	31	22	9	8.0	7.0	1	**5**	0	0
2025	Texas Tech	14	**52**	**32**	**20**	**19.5**	**14.5**	**3**	3	**1**	0
Career		46	163	105	58	42.0	29.0	4	10	1	0
