= Jacob Rodriguez =

American football player (born 2002)

No. 10 – Miami Dolphins
- Position: Linebacker
- Roster status: Active

Personal information
- Born: September 6, 2002 (age 24); Hastings, Minnesota, U.S.
- Listed height: 6 ft 1 in (1.85 m)
- Listed weight: 231 lb (105 kg)

Career information
- High school: S. H. Rider (Wichita Falls, Texas)
- College: Virginia (2021); Texas Tech (2022–2025)
- NFL draft: 2026: 2nd round, 43rd overall pick

Career history
- Miami Dolphins (2026–present)

Awards and highlights
- Bronko Nagurski Trophy (2025); Butkus Award (2025); Lombardi Award (2025); Chuck Bednarik Award (2025); Unanimous All-American (2025); Big 12 Defensive Player of the Year (2025); 2× First-team All-Big 12 (2024, 2025); NCAA records: Forced fumbles in a season: 7 (Note: Tied with Red Murdock of the 2024 Buffalo Bulls, Jake Hansen of the 2019 Illinois Fighting Illini, and Harold Landry of the 2016 Boston College Eagles.) (2025)

Career NFL statistics as of Week 9, 2026
- Tackles: 79
- Sacks: 1
- Forced fumbles: 1
- Pass deflections: 1
- Interceptions: 1
- Stats at Pro Football Reference

Jacob Rodriguez (born September 6, 2002) is an American professional football linebacker for the Miami Dolphins of the National Football League (NFL) He played college football for the Virginia Cavaliers and Texas Tech Red Raiders and was selected by the Dolphins in the second round of the 2026 NFL draft.

== Early life ==
Rodriguez was born in Hastings, Minnesota, to Joe and Ann Rodriguez. He moved to Wichita Falls, Texas, with his family at age 10.

Rodriguez attended S. H. Rider High School in Wichita Falls. He was rated as a three-star recruit and committed to play college football for the Virginia Cavaliers.

== College career ==
=== Virginia ===
As a freshman in 2021, Rodriguez played all 12 games as a quarterback and a "football player," notching 10 carries for 56 yards and hauling in eight receptions for 65 yards. After the season, he entered his name into the NCAA transfer portal.

=== Texas Tech ===
Rodriguez transferred to play for the Texas Tech Red Raiders, where he switched to linebacker. In his first season with Texas Tech in 2022, he appeared in 12 games where he notched 29 tackles with two being for a loss, and a forced fumble. In week 10 of the 2023 season, Rodriguez notched six tackles in a win over TCU. He finished the 2023 season playing in just five games due to injury, where he totaled 32 tackles with one being for a loss, two pass deflections, an interception, two forced fumbles, and a fumble recovery. In week 6 of the 2024 season, Rodriguez was named the Bednarik Defensive player of the week after notching 13 tackles with one being for a loss, a pass deflection, and a forced fumble in a win over Arizona. In week 10, he tallied 13 tackles with two and a half being for a loss, and two sacks in an upset win over Iowa State, earning Big 12 defensive player of the week honors. He finished the season with 127 tackles, five sacks, three forced fumbles and an interception. He led the conference in total tackles and solo tackles and was named to the All-Big 12 first team. In week 4 of the 2025 season, Rodriguez was named Bronko Nagurski Defensive Player of the Week after recording 11 tackles, one interception, and a forced fumble. He would be named to the honor again later in the season when he notched 14 tackles, one interception, and a fumble recovery against No. 7 BYU. In the 2025 Big 12 Championship Game, he had 13 tackles in a 34-7 rematch win against No. 11 BYU helping Texas Tech win their first Big 12 Conference Championship. He finished the year with 128 tackles, 11 tackles for loss, four interceptions, and seven forced fumbles. He was named a unanimous All-American along with teammate David Bailey. He won the Chuck Bednarik Award, the Butkus Award, the Lombardi Award, and the Bronko Nagurski Award becoming the first Texas Tech player to win each award. He finished fifth in voting for the Heisman Trophy.

== Professional career ==
Pre-draft measurables
Height	Weight	Arm length	Hand span	Wingspan	40-yard dash	10-yard split	20-yard split	20-yard shuttle	Three-cone drill	Vertical jump	Broad jump	Bench press
6 ft 1 3/8 in (1.86 m)	231 lb (105 kg)	30 7/8 in (0.78 m)	9 1/4 in (0.23 m)	6 ft 2 5/8 in (1.90 m)	4.57 s	1.60 s	2.67 s	4.19 s	6.90 s	38.5 in (0.98 m)	10 ft 1 in (3.07 m)	23 reps
All values from NFL Combine/Pro Day

Rodriguez was selected by the Miami Dolphins in the second round with the 43rd overall pick of the 2026 NFL draft.

== Career statistics ==
=== College ===
Legend
	Led NCAA Division I FBS
**Bold**	Career high

Season	Team	GP	Tackles					Interceptions					Fumbles			
Season	Team	GP	Cmb	Solo	Ast	TFL	Sck	Int	Yds	Avg	TD	PD	FF	FR	Yds	TD
2021	Virginia	12	1	1	0	0.0	0.0	0	0	—	0	0	0	0	0	0
2022	Texas Tech	12	29	17	12	3.0	0.0	0	0	—	0	0	1	0	0	0
2023	Texas Tech	5	32	21	11	1.0	0.0	1	0	0.0	0	2	2	1	0	0
2024	Texas Tech	13	127	**77**	50	10.5	**5.0**	1	9	9.0	0	4	3	**2**	0	**1**
2025	Texas Tech	14	**128**	63	**65**	**11.0**	1.0	**4**	**41**	**10.3**	0	**6**	**7**	**2**	**69**	**1**
Career		56	317	179	138	25.5	6.0	6	50	8.3	0	12	13	5	69	2

== Personal life ==
Rodriguez is a Christian. He married his wife Emma on July 1, 2023. She is an aviation officer in the United States Army and flies the UH-60 Black Hawk helicopter.
