= Cashius Howell =

American football player (born 2003)

No. 55 – Cincinnati Bengals
- Position: Defensive end
- Roster status: Injured reserve

Personal information
- Born: April 16, 2003 (age 23); Kansas City, Missouri, U.S.
- Listed height: 6 ft 3 in (1.91 m)
- Listed weight: 255 lb (116 kg)

Career information
- High school: Rockhurst (Kansas City)
- College: Bowling Green (2021–2023); Texas A&M (2024–2025)
- NFL draft: 2026: 2nd round, 41st overall pick

Career history
- Cincinnati Bengals (2026–present)

Awards and highlights
- Unanimous All-American (2025); SEC Defensive Player of the Year (2025); First-team All-SEC (2025); Third-team All-MAC (2023)

Career NFL statistics as of Week 8, 2026
- Total tackles: 6
- Sacks: 1
- Stats at Pro Football Reference

Cashius Howell (born April 16, 2003) is an American professional football defensive end for the Cincinnati Bengals of the National Football League (NFL). He played college football for the Texas A&M Aggies and Bowling Green Falcons. Howell received unanimous All-American honors for his performance during the 2025 season. He was selected by the Bengals in the second round of the 2026 NFL draft.

== Early life ==
Howell was born on April 16, 2003 in Kansas City, Missouri. He attended Rockhurst High School in Kansas City. During his high school career, he had 150 tackles, including 21 sacks. He committed to Bowling Green State University to play college football.

== College career ==
=== Bowling Green ===
On July 1, 2021, Howell enrolled at Bowling Green State University. He made his collegiate debut against Murray State during the 2021 season. In 2023, Howell led the Mid-American Conference (MAC) with 9.5 sacks. He was named 2023 Third-team All-MAC. Over 30 games for Bowling Green, Howell had 56 tackles and 11.5 sacks.

On December 23, 2023, Howell entered the transfer portal.

=== Texas A&M ===
On January 8, 2024, he transferred to Texas A&M University. Howell made his Aggies debut against Notre Dame in the season opener, where he recorded two tackles. Howell's first Aggies sack came in a victory against Florida. In the Las Vegas Bowl against USC, Howell made his first Aggies start. Against the Trojans, Howell recorded a sack and his first career interception. On the season, he played in 13 games with one start and had 40 tackles, four sacks and one interception.

In week 2 of the 2025 season, Howell sacked Utah State's quarterback Bryson Barnes on three consecutive plays. For his performance, he was named Southeastern Conference (SEC) defensive player of the week. In week 5 against Mississippi State, Howell recorded three sacks and a pass deflection in the victory. Howell became the first Aggie to record multiple three sack games in a single season since Von Miller in 2009. For his performance, he was named defensive player of the week. He also received unanimous All-American honors, becoming the 11th Texas A&M player to receive them.

=== Statistics ===
Year	Team	Games		Tackles				Fumbles				Interceptions			
Year	Team	GP	GS	Cmb	Solo	Ast	Sck	FF	FR	Yds	TD	Int	Yds	TD	PD
2021	Bowling Green	4	0	6	5	1	0.0	0	0	0	0	0	0	0	0
2022	Bowling Green	13	0	22	6	16	2.0	0	1	7	0	0	0	0	1
2023	Bowling Green	13	11	28	16	12	9.5	1	0	0	0	0	0	0	1
2024	Texas A&M	13	1	40	26	14	4.0	1	0	0	0	1	6	0	7
2025	Texas A&M	12	12	29	16	10	11.5	1	0	0	0	0	0	0	6
Career		55	24	125	72	53	27.0	3	1	7	0	1	6	0	15

== Professional career ==
Pre-draft measurables
Height	Weight	Arm length	Hand span	Wingspan	40-yard dash	10-yard split	20-yard split	Vertical jump	Broad jump	Bench press
6 ft 2 1/2 in (1.89 m)	253 lb (115 kg)	30 1/4 in (0.77 m)	9 1/4 in (0.23 m)	6 ft 2 1/4 in (1.89 m)	4.59 s	1.58 s	2.66 s	32.5 in (0.83 m)	9 ft 7 in (2.92 m)	22 reps
All values from NFL Combine/Pro Day

Howell was selected by the Cincinnati Bengals in the second round, with the 41st overall pick in the 2026 NFL draft.
