= Leonard Moore (American football) =

American football player

No. 15 – Notre Dame Fighting Irish
- Position: Cornerback
- Class: Junior

Personal information
- Born: Oct 28 2005
- Listed height: 6 ft 2 in (1.88 m)
- Listed weight: 197 lb (89 kg)

Career information
- High school: Round Rock (Round Rock, Texas)
- College: Notre Dame (2024–present)

Awards and highlights
- Unanimous All-American (2025); Freshman All-American (2024)
- Stats at ESPN

Leonard Kevin Moore is an American college football cornerback for the Notre Dame Fighting Irish.

== Early life ==
Moore attended Round Rock High School in Round Rock, Texas. During his high school career he had 92 tackles and eight interceptions. He committed to the University of Notre Dame to play college football.

== College career ==
Moore entered his true freshman year at Notre Dame in 2024 as a backup. He started his first career game against the Louisville Cardinals and took over as a full-time starter after Benjamin Morrison suffered a season ending injury. He remained a starter for the remainder of the season and was named to numerous freshman All-American teams.

=== College statistics ===
Year	Team	GP	Tackles				Interceptions				Fumbles		
Year	Team	GP	Total	Solo	Ast	Sack	PD	Int	Yds	TD	FF	FR	TD
2024	Notre Dame	16	48	34	14	0.0	11	2	6	0	2	0	0
2025	Notre Dame	10	31	23	8	0.0	7	5	50	1	1	0	0
2026	Notre Dame	3	5	5	0	0.0	2	0	0	0	0	0	0
Career		29	84	62	22	0.0	20	7	56	1	3	0	0

== Personal life ==
Moore's father Dr. Leonard N. Moore is a college professor, previously at Louisiana State University (LSU) and currently at University of Texas at Austin, with a focus on African-American history and the history of college football.
