= Chuck Bednarik Award =

College football award

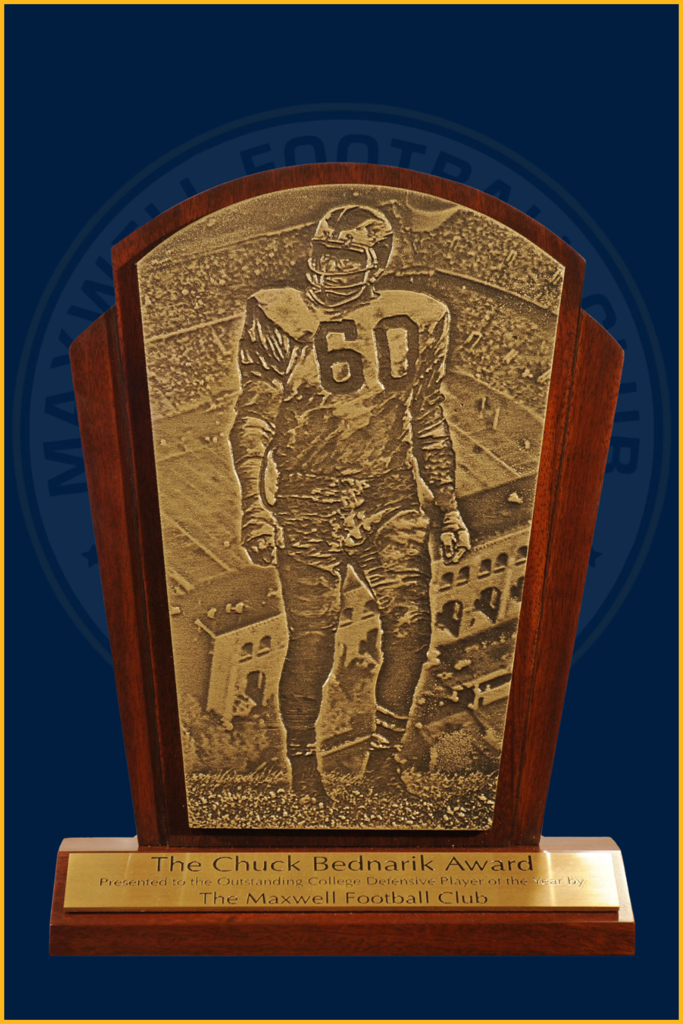
- Chuck Bednarik Award
- Awarded for: College defensive player of the year
- Country: United States
- Presented by: Maxwell Football Club

History
- First award: 1995
- Most recent: Texas Tech linebacker Jacob Rodriguez
- Website: maxwellfootballclub.sportsengine-prelive.com/bednarik-award

The Chuck Bednarik Award is presented annually to the defensive player of the year in college football as judged by the Maxwell Football Club to be the best in the United States. The award is named for Chuck Bednarik, a former college and professional American football player. Voters for the Maxwell College Awards are NCAA head college football coaches, members of the Maxwell Football Club, and sportswriters and sportscasters from across the country. The Maxwell Club is located in Philadelphia, Pennsylvania and the presentations are held in Atlantic City, New Jersey. Club members are given voting privileges for the award.

== Winners ==
Made at least one Pro Bowl during career
Inducted into the Pro Football Hall of Fame

Year	Player	Position	School	Draft	Ref.
1995	Pat Fitzgerald (2)	LB	Northwestern	Undrafted (1997)	
1996	Pat Fitzgerald (2)	LB	Northwestern (2)	Undrafted (1997)	
1997	Charles Woodson	CB	Michigan	4th	
1998	Dat Nguyen	DE	Texas A&M	85th	
1999	LaVar Arrington	LB	Penn State	2nd	
2000	Dan Morgan	LB	Miami (FL)	11th	
2001	Julius Peppers	DE	North Carolina	2nd	
2002	E. J. Henderson	LB	Maryland	40th	
2003	Teddy Lehman	LB	Oklahoma	37th	
2004	David Pollack	DE	Georgia	17th	
2005	Paul Posluszny (2)	LB	Penn State (2)	34th	
2006	Paul Posluszny (2)	LB	Penn State (3)	34th	
2007	Dan Connor	LB	Penn State (4)	74th	
2008	Rey Maualuga	LB	USC	38th	
2009	Ndamukong Suh	DT	Nebraska	2nd	
2010	Patrick Peterson	CB	LSU	5th	
2011	Tyrann Mathieu	CB	LSU (2)	69th (2013)	
2012	Manti Teʻo	LB	Notre Dame	38th	
2013	Aaron Donald	DT	Pittsburgh	13th	
2014	Scooby Wright	LB	Arizona	250th (2016)	
2015	Tyler Matakevich	LB	Temple	246th	
2016	Jonathan Allen	DT	Alabama	17th	
2017	Minkah Fitzpatrick	S	Alabama (2)	11th	
2018	Josh Allen	LB	Kentucky	7th	
2019	Chase Young	DE	Ohio State	2nd	
2020	Zaven Collins	LB	Tulsa	16th	
2021	Jordan Davis	DT	Georgia (2)	13th	
2022	Will Anderson Jr.	LB	Alabama (3)	3rd	
2023	Payton Wilson	LB	NC State	98th	
2024	Travis Hunter	CB	Colorado	2nd	
2025	Jacob Rodriguez	LB	Texas Tech	43rd	

== See also ==
- Bronko Nagurski Trophy, a similar award given by the Football Writers Association of America
