= Beau Stephens =

American football player (born 2002)

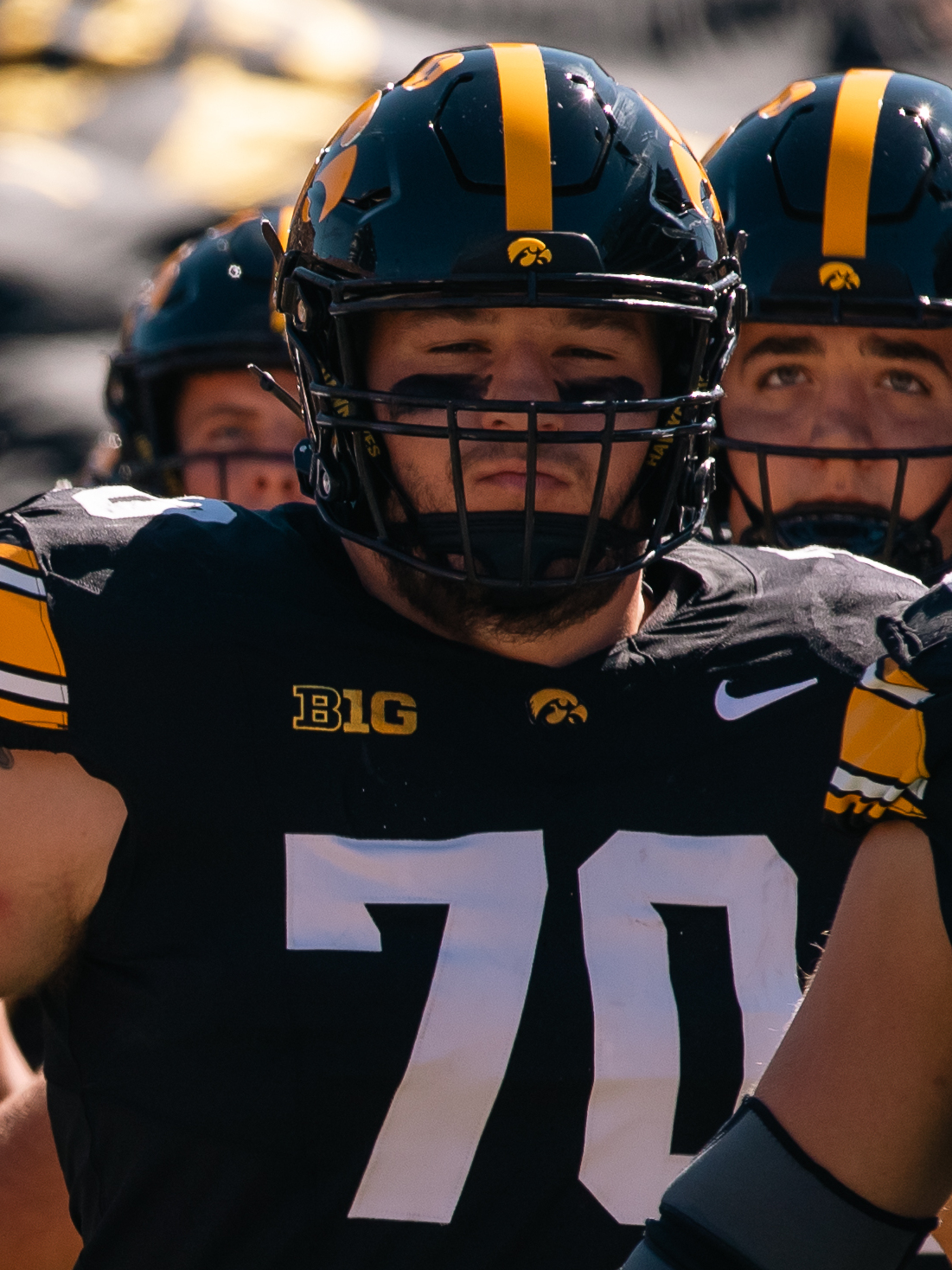
- Stephens with Iowa in 2024

No. 70 – Seattle Seahawks
- Position: Guard
- Roster status: Active

Personal information
- Born: November 1, 2002 (age 24)
- Listed height: 6 ft 5 in (1.96 m)
- Listed weight: 315 lb (143 kg)

Career information
- High school: Blue Springs (Blue Springs, Missouri)
- College: Iowa (2021–2025)
- NFL draft: 2026: 5th round, 148th overall pick

Career history
- Seattle Seahawks (2026–present)

Awards and highlights
- First-team All-American (2025); First-team All-Big Ten (2025); Joe Moore Award (2025) (Note: As part of the Iowa Hawkeyes offensive line)

Career NFL statistics as of Week 4, 2026
- Games played: 3
- Stats at Pro Football Reference

Beau Stephens (born November 1, 2002) is an American professional football guard for the Seattle Seahawks of the National Football League (NFL). He played college football for the Iowa Hawkeyes and was selected by the Seahawks in the fifth round of the 2026 NFL draft.

== Early life ==
Stephens was born November 1, 2002, and attended Blue Springs High School in Blue Springs, Missouri. He played on the school's football team as an offensive lineman and defensive lineman. He was a three-year team captain and was named first-team all-state on offense in his junior season. He also competed in basketball and wrestling. Stephens was rated a four-star college football recruit by 247Sports and Rivals.com and a three-star recruit by ESPN; he committed to play for the Iowa Hawkeyes.

== College career ==
Stephens appeared in one game in 2021 before taking a redshirt for the season. In 2022, he played in 12 games, starting in 10, at right guard. He played in five games in 2023 before suffering a season-ending injury against the Northwestern Wildcats. Stephens started in 12 games in 2024 at left guard, missing one game against the Michigan State Spartans with an ankle injury.

Stephens started at left guard in all 12 games in 2025. He was named first-team All-Big Ten in 2025. The Associated Press named him a first-team All-American and he was also named an All-American by Pro Football Focus and USA Today. Stephens was the highest-rated guard in a power conference by Pro Football Focus and was Iowa's highest-rated player by the same metric. He accepted an invitation to the 2026 Senior Bowl.

== Professional career ==
Pre-draft measurables
Height	Weight	Arm length	Hand span	Wingspan	40-yard dash	10-yard split	20-yard split	20-yard shuttle	Three-cone drill	Vertical jump	Broad jump
6 ft 5 1/2 in (1.97 m)	315 lb (143 kg)	31 1/8 in (0.79 m)	9 1/4 in (0.23 m)	6 ft 5 1/4 in (1.96 m)	5.35 s	1.82 s	3.06 s	4.85 s	7.60 s	30.0 in (0.76 m)	8 ft 6 in (2.59 m)
All values from NFL Combine/Pro Day

Stephens was selected by the Seattle Seahawks in the fifth round (148th overall) of the 2026 NFL draft.
