= Cole Maynard =

American football player

No. 18 – Western Kentucky Hilltoppers
- Position: Punter
- Class: Redshirt Senior

Personal information
- Listed height: 6 ft 1 in (1.85 m)
- Listed weight: 185 lb (84 kg)

Career information
- High school: Hough (Cornelius, North Carolina)
- College: North Carolina (2021–2023); Western Kentucky (2024–2025)

Awards and highlights
- Consensus All-American (2025); Conference USA Special Teams Player of the Year (2025); First team All-CUSA (2025)
- Stats at ESPN

Cole Maynard is an American college football punter for the Western Kentucky Hilltoppers. He was named a Consensus All-American in 2025.

== Early life ==
Maynard is from Mooresville, North Carolina, and is the son of former NFL punter Brad Maynard. He attended William A. Hough High School where he played football as a placekicker and punter, being used for kickoffs, punts and longer field goals. He played two seasons at Hough. After high school, he enrolled at the University of North Carolina at Chapel Hill (UNC) to play college football.

== College career ==
Maynard played in one game as a true freshman at UNC in 2021 and redshirted, posting one punt for 46 yards. He then had one punt in 2022 while appearing in 14 games as a holder before recording one punt in 2023 while playing in 11 games as a holder. Maynard transferred to the Western Kentucky Hilltoppers (WKU) in 2024 and became their starting punter, averaging 42.7 yards per punt with a long of 60 while playing in all 14 games. He remained WKU's punter in 2025 and finished the regular season with an average of 48.7 yards per punt, a mark that placed first nationally. He was named first-team All-Conference USA, the Conference USA Special Teams Player of the Year, and a Consensus All-American.

== Professional career ==
Pre-draft measurables
Height	Weight	Arm length	Hand span	Wingspan
6 ft 0 7/8 in (1.85 m)	185 lb (84 kg)	31 5/8 in (0.80 m)	9 in (0.23 m)	6 ft 3 5/8 in (1.92 m)
All values from Pro Day
