= 2025 All-America college football team =

College football honors

The 2025 All-America college football team includes those players of American college football who have been honored by various selector organizations as the best players at their respective positions. The selector organizations award the "All-America" honor annually following the conclusion of the fall college football season. The original All-America team was the 1889 All-America college football team selected by Caspar Whitney. The National Collegiate Athletic Bureau, which is the National Collegiate Athletic Association's (NCAA) service bureau, compiled in the 1950s the first list of All-Americans, including first-team selections on teams created for a national audience. Since 1957, College Sports Communicators (CSC) has bestowed Academic All-American recognition on male and female athletes in Divisions I, II, and III of the NCAA, as well as NAIA and NJCAA athletes.

The 2025 All-America college football team was composed of the following All-America college football first teams chosen by the following selector organizations: Associated Press (AP), Football Writers Association of America (FWAA), American Football Coaches Association (AFCA), Walter Camp Football Foundation (WCFF), Sporting News (TSN, from its historic name of The Sporting News), Sports Illustrated (SI), The Athletic (Athletic), USA Today (USAT), ESPN, CBS Sports (CBS), Pro Football Focus (PFF), College Football News (CFN), Athlon Sports, and Phil Steele.

Currently, the NCAA compiles consensus All-America teams in the sports of Division I FBS football and Division I men's basketball using a point system computed from All-America teams named by coaches associations or media sources. In football, the teams are compiled by position, and the player accumulating the most points at each position is named a first-team consensus All-American. If there is a tie at a position for first team, then the players who are tied shall be named to the team. Players named first-team by all five selectors are deemed unanimous All-Americans. Currently, the NCAA recognizes All-Americans selected by the AP, AFCA, FWAA, TSN and the WCFF to determine consensus and unanimous All-Americans.

The following players were recognized as consensus All-Americans for 2025. Unanimous selections are followed by an asterisk (*).

In 2025, there were 13 unanimous All-Americans.

2025 Consensus All-Americans
| Name | Position | Year | University |
|---|---|---|---|
| Fernando Mendoza | Quarterback | Junior | Indiana |
| Ahmad Hardy | Running back | Sophomore | Missouri |
| Jeremiyah Love* | Running back | Junior | Notre Dame |
| Skyler Bell | Wide receiver | Redshirt Senior | UConn |
| Makai Lemon* | Wide receiver | Junior | USC |
| Jeremiah Smith* | Wide receiver | Sophomore | Ohio State |
| Eli Stowers* | Tight end | Senior | Vanderbilt |
| Spencer Fano* | Offensive Line | Junior | Utah |
| Logan Jones* | Offensive Line | Senior | Iowa |
| Francis Mauigoa | Offensive Line | Junior | Miami (FL) |
| Kadyn Proctor | Offensive Line | Junior | Alabama |
| Carter Smith | Offensive Line | Redshirt Junior | Indiana |
| David Bailey* | Defensive line | Senior | Texas Tech |
| Rueben Bain Jr. | Defensive line | Junior | Miami (FL) |
| Cashius Howell* | Defensive line | Redshirt Senior | Texas A&M |
| Kayden McDonald* | Defensive line | Junior | Ohio State |
| CJ Allen | Linebacker | Junior | Georgia |
| Arvell Reese | Linebacker | Junior | Ohio State |
| Jacob Rodriguez* | Linebacker | Senior | Texas Tech |
| Mansoor Delane* | Defensive back | Senior | LSU |
| Caleb Downs* | Defensive back | Junior | Ohio State |
| Bishop Fitzgerald | Defensive back | Redshirt Senior | USC |
| Leonard Moore* | Defensive back | Sophomore | Notre Dame |
| Kansei Matsuzawa | Kicker | Senior | Hawaii |
| Cole Maynard | Punter | Senior | Western Kentucky |
| KC Concepcion | All-purpose, return specialist | Junior | Texas A&M |
| Kaden Wetjen | All-purpose, return specialist | Senior | Iowa |

== Offense ==
=== Quarterback ===
- Fernando Mendoza, Indiana (AFCA, AP-1, FWAA, WCFF, Athletic, ESPN, PFF, SI, USAT)
- Diego Pavia, Vanderbilt (TSN, CBS, AP-2)

=== Running back ===
- Jeremiyah Love, Notre Dame (AFCA, AP-1, FWAA, TSN, WCFF, Athletic, CBS, ESPN, PFF, SI, USAT)
- Ahmad Hardy, Missouri (AFCA, AP-1, TSN, WCFF, Athletic, CBS, ESPN, USAT)
- Kewan Lacy, Ole Miss (FWAA, AP-2)
- Emmett Johnson, Nebraska (SI, AP-2)

=== Wide receiver ===
- Makai Lemon, USC (AFCA, AP-1, FWAA, TSN, WCFF, Athletic, CBS, ESPN, PFF, SI, USAT)
- Jeremiah Smith, Ohio State (AFCA, AP-1, FWAA, TSN, WCFF, Athletic, CBS, ESPN, PFF, SI, USAT)
- Skyler Bell, UConn (AFCA, AP-1, TSN)
- Malachi Toney, Miami (FL) (PFF, AP-2)
- Danny Scudero, San Jose State (AP-2)
- Carnell Tate, Ohio State (AP-2)

=== Tight end ===
- Eli Stowers, Vanderbilt (AFCA, AP-1, FWAA, TSN, WCFF, Athletic, CBS, ESPN, PFF, SI, USAT)
- Kenyon Sadiq, Oregon (AP-2)

=== Offensive line ===
- Spencer Fano, Utah (AFCA, AP-1, FWAA, TSN, WCFF, Athletic, CBS, ESPN, SI, USAT)
- Francis Mauigoa, Miami (FL) (AP-1, TSN, WCFF, CBS, SI)
- Kadyn Proctor, Alabama (AFCA, FWAA, WCFF, AP-2)
- Carter Smith, Indiana (AFCA, FWAA, WCFF, Athletic, PFF, USAT, AP-2)
- Emmanuel Pregnon, Oregon (AP-1, TSN, Athletic, CBS, ESPN, SI, USAT)
- Beau Stephens, Iowa (AP-1, PFF, USAT)
- Carson Hinzman, Ohio State (AFCA)
- Iapani Laloulu, Oregon (FWAA)
- Keylan Rutledge, Georgia Tech (TSN, ESPN, SI)
- Olaivavega Ioane, Penn State (CBS, AP-2)
- Febechi Nwaiwu, Oklahoma (Athletic)
- Kade Pieper, Iowa (PFF)
- Keagen Trost, Missouri (PFF)
- Ar'maj Reed-Adams, Texas A&M (AP-2)

=== Center ===
- Logan Jones, Iowa ( AFCA, AP-1, FWAA, TSN, WCFF, Athletic, ESPN, PFF, SI, USAT)
- James Brockermeyer, Miami (FL) (CBS)
- Jake Slaughter, Florida (AP-2)

== Defense ==
=== Defensive line ===
- David Bailey, Texas Tech (AFCA, AP-1, FWAA, TSN, Athletic, CBS, ESPN, PFF, SI, USAT)
- Cashius Howell, Texas A&M (AFCA, AP-1, FWAA, TSN, WCFF, Athletic, CBS, SI, USAT)
- Kayden McDonald, Ohio State (AFCA, AP-1, FWAA, TSN, WCFF, Athletic, CBS, ESPN, PFF, SI, USAT)
- Rueben Bain Jr., Miami (FL) (AFCA, TSN, WCFF, ESPN, PFF, AP-2)
- Landon Robinson, Navy (AP-1, FWAA, SI, USAT)
- John Henry Daley, Utah (WCFF, AP-2)
- A.J. Holmes Jr., Texas Tech (PFF, AP-2)
- Lee Hunter, Texas Tech (Athletic, ESPN)
- A'Mauri Washington, Oregon (CBS)
- Peter Woods, Clemson (AP-2)

=== Linebacker ===
- Jacob Rodriguez, Texas Tech (AFCA, AP-1, FWAA, TSN, WCFF, Athletic, CBS, ESPN, PFF, SI, USAT)
- Arvell Reese, Ohio State (AFCA, AP-1, WCFF, Athletic, CBS, ESPN, SI, USAT)
- CJ Allen, Georgia (AP-1, FWAA, TSN, Athletic, ESPN, USAT)
- Aiden Fisher, Indiana (AFCA, FWAA, CBS)
- David Bailey, Texas Tech (WCFF)
- Sonny Styles, Ohio State (TSN, PFF, AP-2)
- Bryce Boettcher, Oregon (SI)
- Anthony Hill Jr., Texas (AP-2)
- Red Murdock, Buffalo (AP-2)

=== Defensive back ===
- Leonard Moore, Notre Dame (AFCA, AP-1, FWAA, TSN, WCFF, Athletic, CBS, ESPN, PFF, SI, USAT)
- Caleb Downs, Ohio State (AFCA, AP-1, FWAA, TSN, WCFF, Athletic, CBS, ESPN, SI, USAT)
- Mansoor Delane, LSU (AFCA, AP-1, FWAA, TSN, WCFF, Athletic, CBS, ESPN, USAT)
- Bishop Fitzgerald, USC (AP-1, FWAA, WCFF, PFF)
- Jakari Foster, Louisiana Tech (AP-1)
- A. J. Haulcy, LSU (TSN)
- D'Angelo Ponds, Indiana (TSN, SI, AP-2)
- Michael Taaffe, Texas (AFCA)
- Louis Moore, Indiana (CBS, SI, USAT, AP-2)
- Chris Johnson, San Diego State (PFF, AP-2)
- Dillon Thieneman, Oregon (Athletic, ESPN, AP-2)
- Emmanuel McNeil-Warren, Toledo (PFF)
- Hezekiah Masses, California (AP-2)

== Special teams ==
=== Kicker ===
- Kansei Matsuzawa, Hawaii (AFCA, AP-1, WCFF, CBS, ESPN)
- Tate Sandell, Oklahoma (FWAA, TSN, Athletic, PFF, SI, USAT, AP-2)

=== Punter ===
- Cole Maynard, Western Kentucky (AFCA, AP-1, CBS)
- Evan Crenshaw, Troy (FWAA, TSN)
- Brett Thorson, Georgia (WCFF, Athletic, ESPN, SI, USAT, AP-2)
- Billy Gowers, Hawaii (PFF)

=== All-purpose / return specialist ===
- KC Concepcion, Texas A&M (AFCA, AP-1, FWAA, Athletic, SI, USAT)
- Kaden Wetjen, Iowa (FWAA, TSN, WCFF, CBS, ESPN, PFF, SI, USAT)
- Emmett Johnson, Nebraska (TSN, CBS)
- Ryan Niblett, Texas (FWAA)
- Jadarian Price, Notre Dame (TSN, SI)
- Micah Gifford, Baylor (PFF)
- Wayne Knight, James Madison (AP-2)

=== Long snapper ===
- Beau Gardner, Georgia (AFCA)
- Jovoni Borbon, UMass (PFF)

== See also ==
- 2025 FCS All-America college football team
- 2025 Little All-America college football team
- 2025 All-Big 12 Conference football team
- 2025 All-Big Ten Conference football team
- 2025 All-SEC football team
- 2025 All-ACC football team
