= Carter Smith (offensive tackle) =

American football player (born 2004)

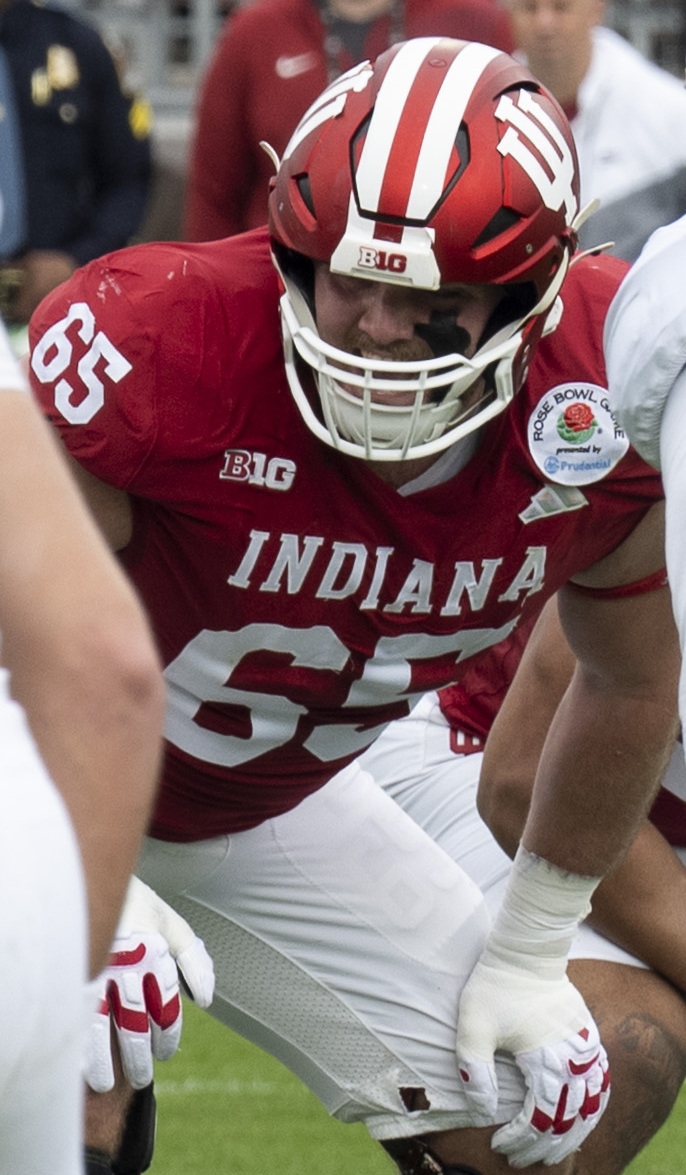
- Smith in 2026

No. 65 – Indiana Hoosiers
- Position: Offensive tackle
- Class: Redshirt Senior

Personal information
- Born: April 15, 2004 (age 22)
- Listed height: 6 ft 5 in (1.96 m)
- Listed weight: 313 lb (142 kg)

Career information
- High school: Olentangy Liberty (Powell, Ohio)
- College: Indiana (2022–present)

Awards and highlights
- CFP national champion (2025); Consensus All-American (2025); Big Ten Offensive Lineman of the Year (2025); First-team All-Big Ten (2025)
- Stats at ESPN

Carter Smith (born April 15, 2004) is an American football offensive tackle for the Indiana Hoosiers.

== Early life ==
Smith attended Olentangy Liberty High School in Powell, Ohio. He was rated as a four-star recruit and the 207th overall prospect in the class of 2022, and committed to play college football for the Indiana Hoosiers.

== College career ==
As a freshman in 2022, Smith was redshirted after playing in two games. In 2023, he made all 12 starts at left tackle. After the season, Smith was rumored to enter the NCAA transfer portal but returned to the Hoosiers. In 2024, he started all 13 games at left tackle, earning honorable mention all-Big Ten honors.
