= 2025–26 NCAA football bowl games =

Series of college football bowl games following the 2025 season

- Season: 2025
- Number of bowls: 64 total: 47 in D-I (Note: 11 College Football Playoff (CFP) games, 35 non-CFP FBS bowl games, and 1 FCS bowl game.); 3 in D-II; 14 in D-III
- All-star games: 4 FBS, 1 FCS
- Bowl games: December 13, 2025 – January 19, 2026 (Note: Dates reflect Division I team-competitive bowl games, and they exclude all-star games and bowl games in lower divisions.)
- National Championship: 2026 College Football Playoff; National Championship
- Location of Championship: Hard Rock Stadium (Miami Gardens, Florida)
- Champions: Indiana Hoosiers
- Bowl Challenge Cup winner: Big Ten Conference
Bowl record by conference
Conference	Bowls	Record	Number of teams in final AP poll
ACC	14	9–5 (0.643)	2
American	9	5–4 (0.556)	3
Big 12	8	4–4 (0.500)	5
Big Ten	16	11–5 (0.688)	6
C–USA	7	4–3 (0.571)	0
MAC	5	2–3 (0.400)	0
Mountain West	7	2–5 (0.286)	0
Pac-12	1	1–0 (1.000)	0
SEC	14	4–10 (0.286)	7
Sun Belt	10	4–6 (0.400)	1
Independent	1	0–1 (0.000)	1
- Note: CFP first-round games are included

The 2025–26 NCAA football bowl games were a series of college football bowl games in the United States, most of which were played to complete the 2025 NCAA Division I FBS football season. Team-competitive bowl games in the Football Bowl Subdivision (FBS) began on December 13, 2025, and concluded with the 2026 College Football Playoff National Championship on January 19, 2026. Several all-star games followed.

== Schedule ==
=== Division I FBS bowl games ===
==== College Football Playoff bowl games ====
The College Football Playoff system was used to determine a national champion of Division I FBS college football. This was the 12th year of the College Football Playoff era, and the second year using an expanded, 12-team format.

A committee of experts ranked the top 25 FBS teams after each of the final six weeks of the regular season. Upon release of the final rankings, the top five ranked conference champions were selected to compete in the playoff, along with the seven highest ranked remaining teams. The top four ranked teams received a first-round bye.

The first round of games were played at campus sites on December 19 and 20, 2025. The quarterfinal and semifinal rounds were played at the New Year's Six bowl games. The quarterfinal games were played on December 31, 2025, and January 1, 2026, at the Cotton Bowl, Orange Bowl, Rose Bowl, and Sugar Bowl. The semifinal games were played on January 8 and 9, 2026, at the Fiesta Bowl and Peach Bowl. The winners advanced to the 2026 College Football Playoff National Championship, played on January 19, 2026, at Hard Rock Stadium in Miami Gardens, Florida.

First round
Dec 20 – Autzen Stadium
5	Oregon	51
12	James Madison	34
Dec 19 – Oklahoma Memorial Stadium
8	Oklahoma	24
9	Alabama	34
Dec 20 – Vaught–Hemingway Stadium
6	Ole Miss	41
11	Tulane	10
Dec 20 – Kyle Field
7	Texas A&M	3
10	Miami (FL)	10

Quarterfinals
Jan 1 – Orange Bowl, Hard Rock Stadium
4	Texas Tech	0
5	Oregon	23
Jan 1 – Rose Bowl, Rose Bowl
1	Indiana	38
9	Alabama	3
Jan 1 – Sugar Bowl, Caesars Superdome
3	Georgia	34
6	Ole Miss	39
Dec 31 – Cotton Bowl Classic, AT&T Stadium
2	Ohio State	14
10	Miami (FL)	24

Semifinals
Jan 9 – Peach Bowl, Mercedes-Benz Stadium
5	Oregon	22
1	Indiana	56
Jan 8 – Fiesta Bowl, State Farm Stadium
6	Ole Miss	27
10	Miami (FL)	31

Championship
Jan 19 – Hard Rock Stadium
1	Indiana	27
10	Miami (FL)	21

All times are EST (UTC−5).

College Football Playoff games
Date	Time	Game	Site	Teams	Affiliations	Results	Attendance	Television	
Date	Time	Game	Site	Teams	Affiliations	Results	Attendance	Network	U.S. viewers (millions)
Dec 19	8:00 pm	On-campus (First round)	Oklahoma Memorial Stadium; Norman, Oklahoma	No. 9 Alabama Crimson Tide (10–3); No. 8 Oklahoma Sooners (10–2)	SEC; SEC	Alabama 34; Oklahoma 24	83,550	ABC, ESPN, ESPN2, ESPNews	14.94
Dec 20	Noon	On-campus (First round)	Kyle Field; College Station, Texas	No. 10 Miami Hurricanes (10–2); No. 7 Texas A&M Aggies (11–1)	ACC; SEC	Miami (FL) 10; Texas A&M 3	104,122	ABC, ESPN, ESPN2, ESPNU	14.72
Dec 20	3:30 pm	On-campus (First round)	Vaught–Hemingway Stadium; Oxford, Mississippi	No. 6 Ole Miss Rebels (11–1); No. 20 Tulane Green Wave (11–2)	SEC; American	Ole Miss 41; Tulane 10	68,251	TNT Sports (TNT, TBS, TruTV, HBO Max)	6.20
Dec 20	7:30 pm	On-campus (First round)	Autzen Stadium; Eugene, Oregon	No. 5 Oregon Ducks (11–1); No. 24 James Madison Dukes (12–1)	Big Ten; Sun Belt	Oregon 51; James Madison 34	55,124	TNT Sports (TNT, TBS, TruTV, HBO Max)	4.36
Dec 31	7:30 pm	Cotton Bowl (Quarterfinal)	AT&T Stadium; Arlington, Texas	No. 10 Miami Hurricanes (11–2); No. 2 Ohio State Buckeyes (12–1)	ACC; Big Ten	Miami (FL) 24; Ohio State 14	71,323	ESPN, ESPN2, ESPNU, ESPNews	19.02
Jan 1	Noon	Orange Bowl (Quarterfinal)	Hard Rock Stadium; Miami Gardens, Florida	No. 5 Oregon Ducks (12–1); No. 4 Texas Tech Red Raiders (12–1)	Big Ten; Big 12	Oregon 23; Texas Tech 0	65,021	ESPN, ESPN2, ESPNU, ESPNews	15.90
Jan 1	4:00 pm	Rose Bowl (Quarterfinal)	Rose Bowl; Pasadena, California	No. 1 Indiana Hoosiers (13–0); No. 9 Alabama Crimson Tide (11–3)	Big Ten; SEC	Indiana 38; Alabama 3	90,278	ESPN, ESPN2, ESPNU, ESPNews	23.90
Jan 1	8:00 pm	Sugar Bowl (Quarterfinal)	Caesars Superdome; New Orleans, Louisiana	No. 6 Ole Miss Rebels (12–1); No. 3 Georgia Bulldogs (12–1)	SEC; SEC	Ole Miss 39; Georgia 34	68,371	ESPN, ESPN2, ESPNU, ESPNews	18.66
Jan 8	7:30 pm	Fiesta Bowl (Semifinal)	State Farm Stadium; Glendale, Arizona	No. 10 Miami Hurricanes (12–2); No. 6 Ole Miss Rebels (13–1)	ACC; SEC	Miami (FL) 31; Ole Miss 27	67,928	ESPN, ESPN2, ESPNU, ESPNews	15.8
Jan 9	7:30 pm	Peach Bowl (Semifinal)	Mercedes-Benz Stadium; Atlanta, Georgia	No. 1 Indiana Hoosiers (14–0); No. 5 Oregon Ducks (13–1)	Big Ten; Big Ten	Indiana 56; Oregon 22	75,604	ESPN, ESPN2, ESPNU, ESPNews	18.0
Jan 19	7:30 pm	College Football Playoff; National Championship	Hard Rock Stadium; Miami Gardens, Florida	No. 1 Indiana Hoosiers (15–0); No. 10 Miami Hurricanes (13–2)	Big Ten; ACC	Indiana 27; Miami (FL) 21	67,227	ESPN, ESPN2, ESPNU, ESPNews	30.1

==== Non-CFP bowl games ====
The 2025–26 bowl game lineup had one change from the previous season: the Bahamas Bowl was replaced with the Xbox Bowl. The Frisco Bowl was temporarily relocated to the Ford Center at The Star to accommodate renovations at Toyota Stadium.

Bowl games that were not part of the College Football Playoff are listed below. Final CFP rankings, issued before these games were played, are listed where applicable.

Non-College Football Playoff games
Date	Time (EST)	Game	Site	Teams	Affiliations	Results	Attendance	Television	
Date	Time (EST)	Game	Site	Teams	Affiliations	Results	Attendance	Network	U.S. viewers (millions)
Dec 13	8:00 pm	LA Bowl	SoFi Stadium; Inglewood, California	Washington Huskies (Note: Former Pac-12 team; considered for bowls with tie-ins to that conference for this bowl season.) (8–4); Boise State Broncos (9–4)	Big Ten; MW	Washington 38; Boise State: 10	23,269	ABC	3.79
Dec 16	9:00 pm	Salute to Veterans Bowl	Cramton Bowl; Montgomery, Alabama	Jacksonville State Gamecocks (8–5); Troy Trojans (8–5)	CUSA; Sun Belt	Jacksonville State 17; Troy: 13	15,721	ESPN	0.96
Dec 17	5:00 pm	Cure Bowl	Camping World Stadium; Orlando, Florida	Old Dominion Monarchs (9–3); South Florida Bulls (9–3)	Sun Belt; American	Old Dominion 24; South Florida: 10	15,036	ESPN	1.18
Dec 17	8:30 pm	68 Ventures Bowl	Hancock Whitney Stadium; Mobile, Alabama	Delaware Fightin' Blue Hens (6–6); Louisiana Ragin' Cajuns (6–6)	CUSA; Sun Belt	Delaware: 20; Louisiana: 13	17,234	ESPN	1.19
Dec 18	9:00 pm	Xbox Bowl	Ford Center at The Star; Frisco, Texas	Arkansas State Red Wolves (6–6); Missouri State Bears (7–5)	Sun Belt; CUSA	Arkansas State 34; Missouri State 28	7,782	ESPN2	0.46
Dec 19	11:00 am	Myrtle Beach Bowl	Brooks Stadium; Conway, South Carolina	Western Michigan Broncos (9–4); Kennesaw State Owls (10–3)	MAC; CUSA	Western Michigan 41; Kennesaw State 6	9,139	ESPN	0.81
Dec 19	2:30 pm	Gasparilla Bowl	Raymond James Stadium; Tampa, Florida	NC State Wolfpack (7–5); Memphis Tigers (8–4)	ACC; American	NC State 31; Memphis 7	13,336	ESPN	1.51
Dec 22	2:00 pm	Famous Idaho Potato Bowl	Albertsons Stadium; Boise, Idaho	Washington State Cougars (6–6); Utah State Aggies (6–6)	Pac-12; MW	Washington State 34; Utah State 21	17,031	ESPN	1.25
Dec 23	2:00 pm	Boca Raton Bowl	Flagler Credit Union Stadium; Boca Raton, Florida	Louisville Cardinals (8–4); Toledo Rockets (8–4)	ACC; MAC	Louisville 27; Toledo 22	15,329	ESPN	1.64
Dec 23	5:30 pm	New Orleans Bowl	Caesars Superdome; New Orleans, Louisiana	Western Kentucky Hilltoppers (8–4); Southern Miss Golden Eagles (7–5)	CUSA; Sun Belt	Western Kentucky 27; Southern Miss 16	16,693	ESPN	2.05
Dec 23	9:00 pm	Frisco Bowl	Ford Center at The Star; Frisco, Texas	Ohio Bobcats (8–4); UNLV Rebels (10–3)	MAC; MW	Ohio 17; UNLV 10	6,521	ESPN	1.70
Dec 24	8:00 pm	Hawaii Bowl	Ching Athletics Complex; Honolulu, Hawaii	Hawaii Rainbow Warriors (8–4); California Golden Bears (7–5)	MW; ACC	Hawaii 35; California 31	15,194	ESPN	2.70
Dec 26	1:00 pm	GameAbove Sports Bowl	Ford Field; Detroit, Michigan	Northwestern Wildcats (6–6); Central Michigan Chippewas (7–5)	Big Ten; MAC	Northwestern 34; Central Michigan 7	27,857	ESPN	2.39
Dec 26	4:30 pm	Rate Bowl	Chase Field; Phoenix, Arizona	Minnesota Golden Gophers (7–5); New Mexico Lobos (9–3)	Big Ten; MW	Minnesota 20; New Mexico 17^{(OT)}	27,439	ESPN	4.43
Dec 26	8:00 pm	First Responder Bowl	Gerald J. Ford Stadium; University Park, Texas	UTSA Roadrunners (6–6); FIU Panthers (7–5)	American; CUSA	UTSA 57; FIU 20	8,671	ESPN	3.13
Dec 27	11:00 am	Military Bowl	Navy–Marine Corps Memorial Stadium; Annapolis, Maryland	East Carolina Pirates (8–4); Pittsburgh Panthers (8–4)	American; ACC	East Carolina 23; Pittsburgh 17	17,016	ESPN	2.51
Dec 27	Noon	Pinstripe Bowl	Yankee Stadium; Bronx, New York	Penn State Nittany Lions (6–6); Clemson Tigers (7–5)	Big Ten; ACC	Penn State 22; Clemson 10	41,101	ABC	7.60
Dec 27	2:15 pm	Fenway Bowl	Fenway Park; Boston, Massachusetts	Army Black Knights (6–6); UConn Huskies (9–3)	American; Independent	Army 41; UConn 16	22,461	ESPN	1.81
Dec 27	3:30 pm	Pop-Tarts Bowl	Camping World Stadium; Orlando, Florida	No. 12 BYU Cougars (11–2); No. 24 Georgia Tech Yellow Jackets (9–3)	Big 12; ACC	BYU 25; Georgia Tech 21	34,126	ABC	8.70
Dec 27	4:30 pm	Arizona Bowl	Casino Del Sol Stadium; Tucson, Arizona	Fresno State Bulldogs (8–4); Miami (OH) RedHawks (7–6)	MW; MAC	Fresno State 18; Miami (OH) 3	37,232	The CW	0.64
Dec 27	5:45 pm	New Mexico Bowl	University Stadium; Albuquerque, New Mexico	No. 25 North Texas Mean Green (11–2); San Diego State Aztecs (9–3)	American; MW	North Texas 49; San Diego State 47	18,867	ESPN	1.39
Dec 27	7:30 pm	Gator Bowl	EverBank Stadium; Jacksonville, Florida	No. 19 Virginia Cavaliers (10–3); Missouri Tigers (8–4)	ACC; SEC	Virginia 13; Missouri 7	31,802	ABC	5.97
Dec 27	9:15 pm	Texas Bowl	NRG Stadium; Houston, Texas	No. 21 Houston Cougars (9–3); LSU Tigers (7–5)	Big 12; SEC	Houston 38; LSU 35	63,867	ESPN	2.92
Dec 29	2:00 pm	Birmingham Bowl	Protective Stadium; Birmingham, Alabama	Georgia Southern Eagles (6–6); Appalachian State Mountaineers (5–7)	Sun Belt; Sun Belt	Georgia Southern 29; Appalachian State 10	12,092	ESPN	1.20
Dec 30	2:00 pm	Independence Bowl	Independence Stadium; Shreveport, Louisiana	Louisiana Tech Bulldogs (7–5); Coastal Carolina Chanticleers (6–6)	CUSA; Sun Belt	Louisiana Tech 23; Coastal Carolina 14	30,298	ESPN	1.75
Dec 30	5:30 pm	Music City Bowl	Nissan Stadium; Nashville, Tennessee	Illinois Fighting Illini (8–4); Tennessee Volunteers (8–4)	Big Ten; SEC	Illinois 30; Tennessee 28	52,815	ESPN	5.38
Dec 30	9:00 pm	Alamo Bowl	Alamodome; San Antonio, Texas	TCU Horned Frogs (8–4); No. 16 USC Trojans (9–3)	Big 12; Big Ten	TCU 30; USC 27^{(OT)}	54,751	ESPN	4.92
Dec 31	Noon	ReliaQuest Bowl	Raymond James Stadium; Tampa, Florida	No. 23 Iowa Hawkeyes (8–4); No. 14 Vanderbilt Commodores (10–2)	Big Ten; SEC	Iowa 34; Vanderbilt 27	35,382	ESPN	4.60
Dec 31	2:00 pm	Sun Bowl	Sun Bowl; El Paso, Texas	Duke Blue Devils (8–5); Arizona State Sun Devils (8–4)	ACC; Big 12	Duke 42; Arizona State 39	44,975	CBS	2.34
Dec 31	3:00 pm	Citrus Bowl	Camping World Stadium; Orlando, Florida	No. 13 Texas Longhorns (9–3); No. 18 Michigan Wolverines (9–3)	SEC; Big Ten	Texas 41; Michigan 27	47,316	ABC	9.05
Dec 31	3:30 pm	Las Vegas Bowl	Allegiant Stadium; Paradise, Nevada	No. 15 Utah Utes (10–2); Nebraska Cornhuskers (7–5)	Big 12; Big Ten	Utah 44; Nebraska 22	38,879	ESPN	3.02
Jan 2	1:00 pm	Armed Forces Bowl	Amon G. Carter Stadium; Fort Worth, Texas	Texas State Bobcats (6–6); Rice Owls (5–7)	Sun Belt; American	Texas State 41; Rice 10	28,243	ESPN	1.80
Jan 2	4:30 pm	Liberty Bowl	Simmons Bank Liberty Stadium; Memphis, Tennessee	Navy Midshipmen (10–2); Cincinnati Bearcats (7–5)	American; Big 12	Navy 35; Cincinnati 13	21,908	ESPN	3.44
Jan 2	8:00 pm	Duke's Mayo Bowl	Bank of America Stadium; Charlotte, North Carolina	Wake Forest Demon Deacons (8–4); Mississippi State Bulldogs (5–7)	ACC; SEC	Wake Forest 43; Mississippi State 29	29,328	ESPN	2.61
Jan 2	8:00 pm	Holiday Bowl	Snapdragon Stadium; San Diego, California	SMU Mustangs (8–4); No. 17 Arizona Wildcats (9–3)	ACC; Big 12	SMU 24; Arizona 19	30,602	FOX	2.17

=== Division I FCS bowl game ===
The Football Championship Subdivision (FCS) had one bowl game, the Celebration Bowl. Played between HBCUs, it served as a de facto Black college football national championship. The FCS also had a postseason bracket tournament that culminated in the 2026 NCAA Division I Football Championship Game, won by Montana State.

Date	Time (EST)	Game	Site	Television	Teams	Affiliations	Results	Attendance
Dec 13	Noon	Celebration Bowl	Mercedes-Benz Stadium; Atlanta, Georgia	ABC	South Carolina State Bulldogs (9–3); Prairie View A&M Panthers (10–3)	MEAC; SWAC	South Carolina State 40; Prairie View A&M 38^{(4OT)}	26,703

=== Division II bowl games ===
Three bowl games were held which featured teams that did not qualify for the postseason tournament. This was up from only two bowls in past season, with the addition of the First Americans Bowl.

Date	Visiting team	Home team	Site	Result	Attendance	Ref.
December 6	Arkansas Tech	West Texas A&M	Community National Bank & Trust Stadium • Corsicana, Texas (Heritage Bowl)	27–28	4,685	
December 6	Upper Iowa	Hillsdale	Brickyard Stadium • Hobart, Indiana (Albanese Candy Bowl)	37–28	382	
December 6	East Central	Northeastern State	Doc Wadley Stadium • Tahlequah, Oklahoma (First Americans Bowl)	21–56	4,977	
^{#}Rankings from AFCA Coaches poll released prior to the game.

=== Division III bowl games ===
Division III held 14 bowl games in 2025, featuring teams that did not qualify for the Division III postseason tournament. This total is up one from the 13 held in 2024, with the return of the Lynah Bowl.

Date	Visiting team	Home team	Site	Result	Attendance	Ref.
November 21	Merchant Marine	Curry	Walter M. Katz Field • Milton, Massachusetts (Fusion Bowl)	27–24	1,000	
November 22	Misericordia	Carnegie Mellon	Gesling Stadium • Pittsburgh, Pennsylvania (Centennial–MAC Bowl Series)	17–24	453	
November 22	Dickinson	Delaware Valley	James Work Memorial Stadium • Doylestown, Pennsylvania (Centennial–MAC Bowl Series)	13–14	721	
November 22	Lebanon Valley	Ursinus	Patterson Field • Collegeville, Pennsylvania (Centennial–MAC Bowl Series)	13–31	987	
November 22	Geneva	Brockport	Bob Boozer Field • Brockport, New York (Whitelaw Bowl)	10–46	1,175	
November 22	RPI	St. John Fisher	Growney Stadium • Pittsford, New York (Chapman Bowl)	35–24	1,181	
November 22	Rowan	Utica	Charles A. Gaetano Stadium • Utica, New York (Bushnell Bowl)	26–20	2,655	
November 22	Hobart	Maritime	Reinhart Field • Throggs Neck, New York (Lynah Bowl)	42–14	1,532	
November 22	Aurora	Illinois College	Raabe Stadium • Wauwatosa, Wisconsin (Lakefront Bowl)	49–14	453	
November 22	Wilkes	Shenandoah	Shentel Stadium • Winchester, Virginia (Cape Henry Bowl)	37–35	2,890	
November 22	Washington & Lee	Lycoming	Girardi Stadium • Williamsport, Pennsylvania (Cape Charles Bowl)	14–12	945	
November 22	Washington University	UW–Stout	Bank of Sun Prairie Stadium • Sun Prairie, Wisconsin (Isthmus Bowl)	23–31	975	
November 22	Ohio Northern	Wabash	Tom Benson Hall of Fame Stadium • Canton, Ohio (ForeverLawn Bowl)	31–32	0	
November 22	Mount St. Joseph	Westminster (PA)	Tom Benson Hall of Fame Stadium • Canton, Ohio (Extra Points Bowl)	21–40	0	
^{#}Rankings from D3football.com poll released prior to the game.

=== All-star games ===
The Tropical Bowl was canceled due to "unforeseen circumstances" outside of the control of the organizers. The FCS Bowl was postponed indefinitely for similar reasons. The American Bowl was added to the all-star slate.

Date	Time (EST)	Game	Site	Television	Participants	Results	Ref.
Jan 10	Noon	Hula Bowl	Spec Martin Stadium; DeLand, Florida	CBS Sports Network (Note: It was reported that the Hula Bowl did not air on CBS Sports Network as had been planned.)	Team Kai; Team Aina	Kai 38; Aina 21	
Jan 22	8:00 pm	The American Bowl	Victory Field; Lakeland, Florida	NFL Network	Team Warhawks; Team Guardians	Warhawks 7 Guardians 6	
Jan 27	7:00 pm	East–West Shrine Bowl	Ford Center at The Star; Frisco, Texas	NFL Network	West Team; East Team	West 21; East 17	
Jan 31	2:30 pm	Senior Bowl	Hancock Whitney Stadium; Mobile, Alabama	NFL Network	American Team; National Team	American 17; National 9	
Feb 21	4:00 pm	HBCU Legacy Bowl	Yulman Stadium; New Orleans, Louisiana	NFL Network	Team Gaither; Team Robinson	Gaither 27; Robinson 23	

The HBCU Legacy Bowl features players from historically black colleges and universities (HBCU). Most HBCU football programs compete in the Mid-Eastern Athletic Conference (MEAC) or the Southwestern Athletic Conference (SWAC), which are part of FCS.

== Team selections ==
=== CFP top 25 standings and bowl games ===
The College Football Playoff (CFP) selection committee announced its final team rankings for the season on December 7, 2025.

The top five ranked conference champions, along with the seven highest ranked remaining teams, were selected to compete in the College Football Playoff. The top four ranked teams received a first-round bye. This was a change from the 2024–25 season, when the top four ranked conference champions were given a first-round bye.

This was the first time that two Group of Five teams – Tulane and James Madison – were included in the playoff.

Rank	Team	W–L	Conference and standing	Bowl game
1	Indiana Hoosiers	13–0	Big Ten champions	Rose Bowl (CFP quarterfinal)
2	Ohio State Buckeyes	12–1	Big Ten first place (tie)	Cotton Bowl (CFP quarterfinal)
3	Georgia Bulldogs	12–1	SEC champions	Sugar Bowl (CFP quarterfinal)
4	Texas Tech Red Raiders	12–1	Big 12 champions	Orange Bowl (CFP quarterfinal)
5	Oregon Ducks	11–1	Big Ten third place	CFP first-round game
6	Ole Miss Rebels	11–1	SEC first place (tie)	CFP first-round game
7	Texas A&M Aggies	11–1	SEC first place (tie)	CFP first-round game
8	Oklahoma Sooners	10–2	SEC fifth place (tie)	CFP first-round game
9	Alabama Crimson Tide	10–3	SEC first place (tie)	CFP first-round game
10	Miami Hurricanes	10–2	ACC second place (tie)	CFP first-round game
11	Notre Dame Fighting Irish	10–2	Independent	Declined bowl bid
12	BYU Cougars	11–2	Big 12 first place (tie)	Pop-Tarts Bowl
13	Texas Longhorns	9–3	SEC fifth place (tie)	Citrus Bowl
14	Vanderbilt Commodores	10–2	SEC fifth place (tie)	ReliaQuest Bowl
15	Utah Utes	10–2	Big 12 third place	Las Vegas Bowl
16	USC Trojans	9–3	Big Ten fourth place (tie)	Alamo Bowl
17	Arizona Wildcats	9–3	Big 12 fourth place (tie)	Holiday Bowl
18	Michigan Wolverines	9–3	Big Ten fourth place (tie)	Citrus Bowl
19	Virginia Cavaliers	10–3	ACC first place	Gator Bowl
20	Tulane Green Wave	11–2	American champions	CFP first-round game
21	Houston Cougars	9–3	Big 12 fourth place (tie)	Texas Bowl
22	Georgia Tech Yellow Jackets	9–3	ACC second place (tie)	Pop-Tarts Bowl
23	Iowa Hawkeyes	8–4	Big Ten sixth place	ReliaQuest Bowl
24	James Madison Dukes	12–1	Sun Belt champions	CFP first-round game
25	North Texas Mean Green	11–2	American first place (tie)	New Mexico Bowl

Unranked conference champions' bowl games
Rank	Team	W–L	Conference and standing	Bowl game
–	Kennesaw State Owls	10–4	CUSA champions	Myrtle Beach Bowl
–	Western Michigan Broncos	10–4	MAC champions	Myrtle Beach Bowl
–	Boise State Broncos	9–5	Mountain West champions	LA Bowl
–	Duke Blue Devils	8–5	ACC champions	Sun Bowl

=== Selection of teams ===
The below lists of teams are based on team records as published by the NCAA and bowl eligibility criteria.

==== Bowl-eligible teams ====
- ACC (11): California^{†}, Clemson, Duke, Georgia Tech, Louisville, Miami (FL), NC State, Pittsburgh, SMU, Virginia, Wake Forest
- American (8): Army, East Carolina, Memphis, Navy, North Texas, South Florida, Tulane, UTSA
- Big Ten (12): Illinois, Indiana, Iowa, Michigan, Minnesota, Nebraska, Northwestern, Ohio State, Oregon^{†}, Penn State, USC^{†}, Washington^{†}
- Big 12 (10): Arizona^{†}, Arizona State^{†}, BYU, Cincinnati, Houston, Iowa State^{‡}, Kansas State^{‡}, TCU, Texas Tech, Utah
- CUSA (7): Delaware (Note: Delaware was normally bowl-ineligible due to their FCS-to-FBS transition; however, as they posted a bowl-eligible record and there were not enough bowl-eligible teams, they were invited.), FIU, Jacksonville State, Kennesaw State, Louisiana Tech, Missouri State (Note: Missouri State was normally bowl-ineligible due to their FCS-to-FBS transition; however, as they posted a bowl-eligible record and there were not enough bowl-eligible teams, they were invited.), Western Kentucky
- MAC (5): Central Michigan, Miami (OH), Ohio, Toledo, Western Michigan
- Mountain West (7): Boise State, Fresno State, Hawaii, New Mexico, San Diego State, UNLV, Utah State
- Pac-12 (1): Washington State
- SEC (10): Alabama, Georgia, LSU, Missouri, Ole Miss, Oklahoma, Tennessee, Texas, Texas A&M, Vanderbilt
- Sun Belt (9): Arkansas State, Coastal Carolina, Georgia Southern, James Madison, Louisiana, Old Dominion, Southern Miss, Texas State, Troy
- Independent (2): Notre Dame^{‡}, UConn

Number of postseason berths available: 82

Number of bowl-eligible teams: 82

^{†}: Former Pac-12 teams were considered for bowls with Pac-12 tie-ins instead of their current conference for 2025.

^{‡} Iowa State, Kansas State, and Notre Dame opted out of their bowl games, but they were still bowl-eligible.

==== Teams declining a bowl ====
Several teams declined bowl bids:

- ACC (1): Florida State^{†}
- American (1): Temple^{†} (Note: Temple later clarified that while they were offered a bid, they did not have enough time to accept the bid before it was offered to another school.)
- Big Ten (1): Rutgers^{†}
- Big 12 (5): Baylor^{†}, Kansas^{†}, UCF^{†}, Iowa State, Kansas State
- SEC (1): Auburn^{†}
- Independent (1): Notre Dame

^{†} Florida State, Temple, Rutgers, Baylor, Kansas, UCF, and Auburn were not bowl-eligible, but they were asked to participate in a bowl game due to bowl-eligible teams opting out.

==== Bowl-ineligible teams ====
- ACC (6): Boston College, Florida State, North Carolina, Stanford, Syracuse, Virginia Tech
- American (6): Charlotte, Florida Atlantic, Rice^{†}, Temple, Tulsa, UAB
- Big Ten (6): Maryland, Michigan State, Purdue, Rutgers, UCLA, Wisconsin
- Big 12 (6): Baylor, Colorado, Kansas, Oklahoma State, UCF, West Virginia
- CUSA (5): Liberty, Middle Tennessee, New Mexico State, Sam Houston, UTEP
- MAC (8): Akron (Note: Akron was ineligible due to low APR scores. The team posted a 5–7 record for the season, and they would not have been bowl-eligible regardless. They would have been bowl ineligible in any circumstance as they finished 5–7.), Ball State, Bowling Green, Buffalo, Eastern Michigan, Kent State, Northern Illinois, UMass
- Mountain West (5): Air Force, Colorado State, Nevada, San Jose State, Wyoming
- Pac-12 (1): Oregon State
- SEC (6): Arkansas, Auburn, Florida, Kentucky, Mississippi State^{†}, South Carolina
- Sun Belt (5): Appalachian State^{†}, Georgia State, Louisiana–Monroe, Marshall, South Alabama

Number of bowl-ineligible teams: 54

^{†} Appalachian State, Mississippi State, and Rice were not bowl-eligible, but they participated in a bowl game due to bowl-eligible teams opting out.

== Conference performance in bowl games ==
CFP bowl games are denoted in bold type. First-round CFP playoff games are included, and denoted as CFP1.

Conference	Games			Record	Win%	Bowls	
Conference	CFP	Other	Total	Record	Win%	Won	Lost
ACC	3	11	14	9–5	.643	**CFP1**, **Cotton**, **Fiesta**, Gasparilla, Boca Raton, Gator, Sun, Holiday, Duke's Mayo	Hawaii, Military, Pinstripe, Pop-Tarts, **Championship**
American	1	8	9	5–4	.556	First Responder, Military, Fenway, New Mexico, Liberty	**CFP1**, Cure, Gasparilla, Armed Forces
Big 12	1	7	8	4–4	.500	Pop-Tarts, Texas, Alamo, Las Vegas	**Orange**, Sun, Liberty, Holiday
Big Ten	7	9	16	11–5	.688	**CFP1**, **Orange**, **Rose**, **Peach**, **Championship**, LA, GameAbove Sports, Rate, Pinstripe, Music City, ReliaQuest	**Cotton**, **Peach**, Alamo, Las Vegas, Citrus
CUSA	—N/a	7	7	4–3	.571	Salute to Veterans, 68 Ventures, New Orleans, Independence	Xbox, Myrtle Beach, First Responder
MAC	—N/a	5	5	2–3	.400	Myrtle Beach, Frisco	Boca Raton, GameAbove Sports, Arizona
Mountain West	—N/a	7	7	2–5	.286	Hawaii, Arizona	LA, Famous Idaho Potato, Frisco, Rate, New Mexico
Pac-12	—N/a	1	1	1–0	1.000	Famous Idaho Potato	—N/a
SEC	8	6	14	4–10	.286	**CFP1 × 2**, **Sugar**, Citrus	**CFP1 × 2**, **Rose**, **Sugar**, **Fiesta**, Gator, Texas, Music City, ReliaQuest, Duke's Mayo
Sun Belt	1	9	10	4–6	.400	Cure, Xbox, Birmingham, Armed Forces	**CFP1**, Salute to Veterans, 68 Ventures, New Orleans, Birmingham, Independence
Independent	—N/a	1	1	0–1	.000	—N/a	Fenway

Notes:

- One CFP first-round game featured two SEC teams.
- The Birmingham Bowl featured two Sun Belt teams.
- The Sugar Bowl featured two SEC teams.
- The Peach Bowl featured two Big Ten teams.

== Venues ==
=== Non-CFP bowls ===
This bowl season's 35 non-CFP bowl games utilized 31 different venues. (Note: During this bowl season, the Cure Bowl, Pop-Tarts Bowl, and Citrus Bowl shared the same venue; the Gasparilla Bowl and ReliaQuest Bowl shared the same venue; and the Frisco Bowl and Xbox Bowl shared the same venue.) Prestige and capacity of venues usually increases as the schedule progresses through December, in large part due to scheduling the top 25 teams late into the bowl games' time frame, while bowl games before Christmas typically involve schools in Group of Five conferences. The televising of bowl games was largely run by ESPN and its associated networks (ABC and ESPN2), with only three bowl games broadcast by a non-affiliated network: the Holiday Bowl on Fox, the Sun Bowl on CBS, and the Arizona Bowl on The CW.

=== CFP bowls ===
The College Football Playoff, which includes the New Year's Six, was staged at a total of six different venues for the quarterfinals (4 games), semifinals (2 games), and championship (1 game):

- AT&T Stadium in Arlington was the venue for the Cotton Bowl, a quarterfinal.
- Hard Rock Stadium in Miami Gardens was the venue for the Orange Bowl, a quarterfinal, and the 2026 College Football Playoff National Championship.
- Rose Bowl in Pasadena was the venue for the Rose Bowl, a quarterfinal.
- Caesars Superdome in New Orleans was the venue for the Sugar Bowl, a quarterfinal.
- State Farm Stadium in Glendale was the venue for the Fiesta Bowl, a semifinal.
- Mercedes-Benz Stadium in Atlanta was the venue for the Peach Bowl, a semifinal.

The four first-round games, not listed here, were contested at campus sites.

Glendale (Phoenix area)	Atlanta	New Orleans
State Farm Stadium	Mercedes-Benz Stadium	Caesars Superdome
Capacity: 78,600	Capacity: 75,000	Capacity: 76,468
Exterior of the stadium, 2006	Near completion in August 2017	The Superdome on July 26, 2021, between removal of Mercedes-Benz branding and installation of Caesars branding.
Pasadena (Los Angeles area)	Venues of the 2025-26 New Year's Six Bowls Source: College Football Playoff	
Rose Bowl	Venues of the 2025-26 New Year's Six Bowls Source: College Football Playoff	
Capacity: 89,702	Venues of the 2025-26 New Year's Six Bowls Source: College Football Playoff	
Aerial view from south in 2018	Venues of the 2025-26 New Year's Six Bowls Source: College Football Playoff	
Arlington (Dallas/Fort Worth area)	Miami Gardens (Miami area)^{NC}	
AT&T Stadium	Hard Rock Stadium	
Capacity: 105,000	Capacity: 64,767	
Exterior, June 2020	Exterior view, January 2020	

=== Venues hosting multiple bowls ===
The following venues were selected to host more than one bowl game or all-star game:

- Caesars Superdome (New Orleans): New Orleans Bowl, Sugar Bowl
- Camping World Stadium (Orlando): Cure Bowl, Pop-Tarts Bowl, Citrus Bowl
- Ford Center at The Star (Dallas area): Frisco Bowl, Xbox Bowl, East–West Shrine Bowl†
- Hancock Whitney Stadium (Mobile): 68 Ventures Bowl, Senior Bowl†
- Hard Rock Stadium (Miami area): Orange Bowl, National Championship
- Mercedes-Benz Stadium (Atlanta): Peach Bowl, Celebration Bowl‡
- Raymond James Stadium (Tampa): Gasparilla Bowl, ReliaQuest Bowl

† Denotes an all-star game
‡ Denotes an FCS bowl game
