= Myrtle Beach Bowl =

College football postseason game

- Stadium: Brooks Stadium
- Location: Conway, South Carolina
- Operated: 2020–present
- Conference tie-ins: Conference USA; Mid-American Conference; Sun Belt Conference
- Website: myrtlebeachbowlgame.com

Sponsors
- Engine (2025)

Former names
- Myrtle Beach Bowl presented by Engine (2025)

2025 matchup
- Kennesaw State vs. Western Michigan (Western Michigan 41–6)

The Myrtle Beach Bowl is an NCAA Division I Football Bowl Subdivision (FBS) college football bowl game first played in December 2020 in the Myrtle Beach metropolitan area. Coastal Carolina University hosts the game at its Brooks Stadium in Conway, South Carolina, which has a capacity of 20,000 seats following an expansion project completed prior to the 2019 season.

Owned by ESPN Events, the bowl has tie-ins with Conference USA, the Mid-American Conference and the Sun Belt Conference. The affiliation contract with ESPN Events has each conference supplying a team four times in a six-year bowl cycle from 2020 to 2025. The Myrtle Beach Bowl is one of three contemporary bowl games that have never released payout totals for the teams involved in the game (the Fenway Bowl and the LA Bowl are the others).

== History ==
In 2013, "Group of Five" conferences were looking to start bowl games for their leagues, as the Power Five conferences "prefer to play each other in bowl games". The NCAA had a restriction on championship games, including bowl games, being held in South Carolina due to display of the Confederate flag on State House grounds, which was lifted in July 2015. Organizers for the Medal of Honor Bowl, an all-star game, announced their intent to apply for NCAA sanctioning as a traditional postseason bowl game featuring FBS college teams, with a tentative game date of December 18, 2016. However, in April 2016, the NCAA announced a three-year moratorium on new bowl games.

In June 2018, the NCAA indicated that the Grand Strand area was approved for a bowl game. The Myrtle Beach Bowl was subsequently announced on November 13, 2018, by ESPN Events, with tie-ins to three conferences: the Sun Belt Conference, Conference USA (C-USA), and Mid-American Conference (MAC). During 2017–18 bowl season, there had been three teams that were bowl eligible but did not go to a bowl, as all slots were filled: Western Michigan and Buffalo from the MAC, and UTSA from C-USA.

The bowl made its debut as part of the 2020–21 bowl season, matching North Texas of C-USA and Appalachian State of the Sun Belt.

On November 6, 2025, Engine, a business and group travel platform, signed on a sponsor of the game, officially named the Myrtle Beach Bowl presented by Engine. The deal quietly expired after one season.

== Game results ==
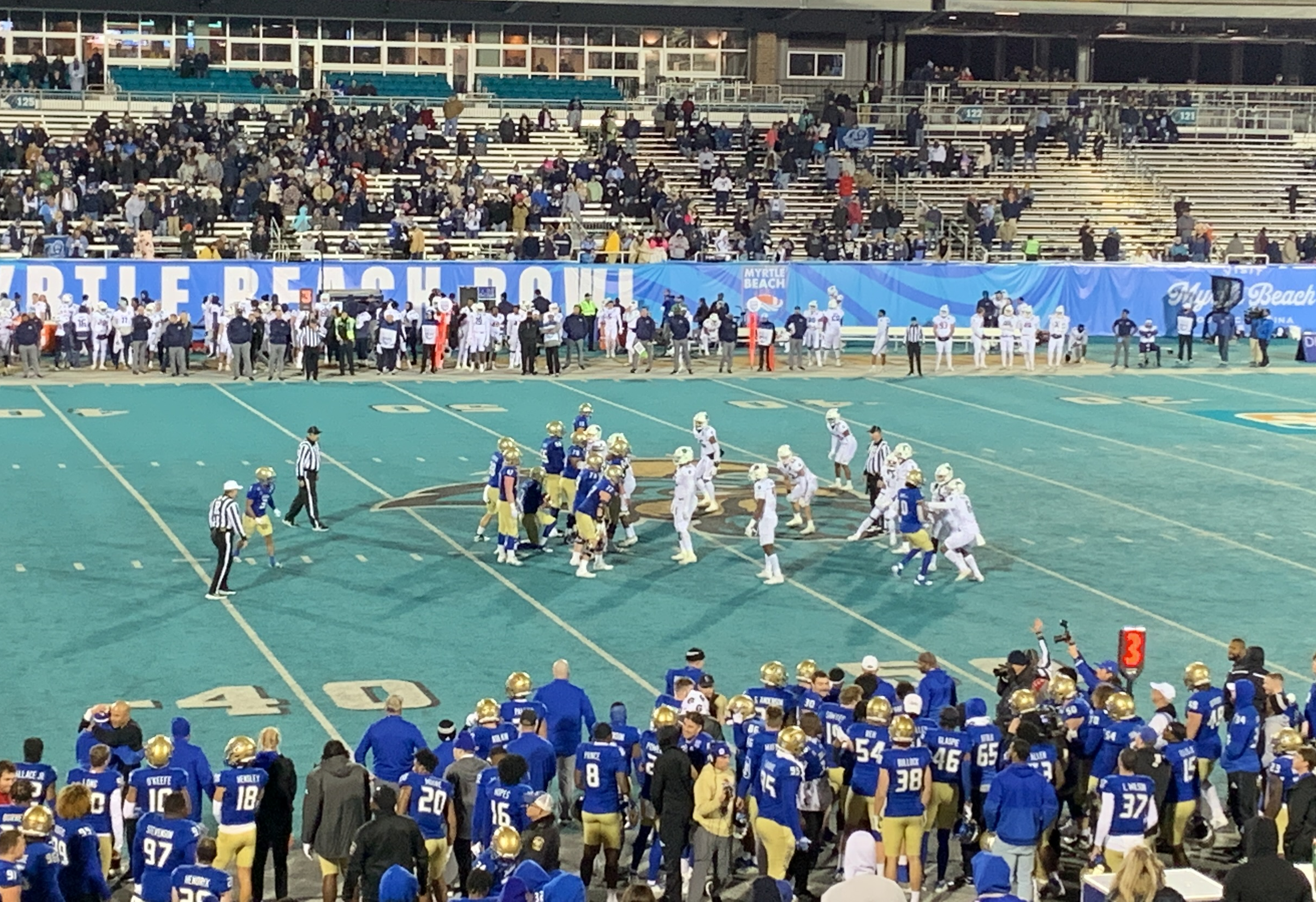
Tulsa quarterback Davis Brin takes a knee to end the 2021 game

| Date | Winning Team | | Losing Team | | Attendance | Notes |
|---|---|---|---|---|---|---|
| December 21, 2020 | Appalachian State | 56 | North Texas | 28 | 5,000 | notes |
| December 20, 2021 | Tulsa | 30 | Old Dominion | 17 | 6,557 | notes |
| December 19, 2022 | Marshall | 28 | UConn | 14 | 12,023 | notes |
| December 16, 2023 | Ohio | 41 | Georgia Southern | 21 | 8,059 | notes |
| December 23, 2024 | UTSA | 44 | Coastal Carolina | 15 | 8,164 | notes |
| December 19, 2025 | Western Michigan | 41 | Kennesaw State | 6 | 9,139 | notes |

== MVPs ==
| Year | Player | College | Position | Ref. |
|---|---|---|---|---|
| 2020 | Camerun Peoples | Appalachian State | RB | |
| 2021 | Davis Brin | Tulsa | QB | |
| 2022 | Rasheen Ali | Marshall | RB | |
| 2023 | Rickey Hunt Jr. | Ohio | RB | |
| 2024 | Owen McCown | UTSA | QB | |
| 2025 | Jaylen Buckley | Western Michigan | RB | |

== Appearances by team ==
Updated through the December 2025 edition (6 games, 12 total appearances).

Teams with a single appearance

Won (6): Appalachian State, Marshall, Ohio, Tulsa, UTSA, Western Michigan
Lost (6): Coastal Carolina, Georgia Southern, Kennesaw State, North Texas, Old Dominion, UConn

== Appearances by conference ==
Updated through the December 2025 edition (6 games, 12 total appearances).

| Conference | Record | | | | Appearances by season | |
| Conference | Games | W | L | Win pct. | Won | Lost |
|---|---|---|---|---|---|---|
| Sun Belt | 4 | 2 | 2 | .500 | 2020, 2022 | 2023, 2024 |
| C-USA | 3 | 0 | 3 | .000 | | 2020, 2021, 2025 |
| American | 2 | 2 | 0 | 1.000 | 2021, 2024 | |
| MAC | 2 | 2 | 0 | 1.000 | 2023, 2025 | |
| Independent | 1 | 0 | 1 | .000 | | 2022 |

Independent appearances: UConn (2022)

== Media coverage ==
The bowl has been televised by ESPN since its inception.

== Game records ==
Updated through the December 2024 game.

| Team | Performance vs. Opponent | Year |
|---|---|---|
| Most points scored | 56, Appalachian State vs. North Texas | 2020 |
| Fewest points allowed | 6, Western Michigan vs. Kennesaw State | 2025 |
| Margin of victory | 35, Western Michigan vs. Kennesaw State | 2025 |
| First downs | 35, Tulsa vs. Old Dominion | 2021 |
| Total yards | 638, Appalachian State vs. North Texas | 2020 |
| Rushing yards | 502, Appalachian State vs. North Texas | 2020 |
| Passing yards | 350, Georgia Southern vs. Ohio | 2023 |
| Most points scored (losing team) | 28, North Texas vs. Appalachian State | 2020 |
| Most points scored (both teams) | 84, Appalachian State vs. North Texas | 2020 |
| Fewest yards allowed | 247, Old Dominion vs. Tulsa | 2021 |
| Fewest rushing yards allowed | 33, Ohio vs. Georgia Southern | 2023 |
| Fewest passing yards allowed | 93, Marshall vs. UConn | 2022 |
| Individual | Player (Team) | Year |
| Points scored | 30, shared by: Camerun Peoples (Appalachian State); Rickey Hunt (Ohio) | 2020; 2023 |
| All-Purpose yards | 317, Camerun Peoples (Appalachian State) | 2020 |
| Rushing yards | 317, Camerun Peoples (Appalachian State) | 2020 |
| Passing yards | 350, Davis Brin (Georgia Southern) | 2023 |
| Receiving yards | 131, Austin Ogunmakin (North Texas) | 2020 |
| Touchdowns (all-purpose) | 5, shared by: Camerun Peoples (Appalachian State); Rickey Hunt (Ohio) | 2020; 2023 |
| Passing touchdowns | 2, shared by: Jason Bean (North Texas); Davis Brin (Tulsa); Cam Fancher (Marshall); Davis Brin (Georgia Southern); Tad Hudson (Coastal Carolina); Broc Lowry (Western Michigan) | 2020; 2021; 2022; 2023; 2024; 2025 |
| Rushing touchdowns | 5, Camerun Peoples (Appalachian State) | 2020 |
| Receiving touchdowns | 2, shared by: Henry Pearson (Appalachian State); Loronzo Thompson (North Texas) | 2020 |
| Receptions | 8, Josh Johnson (Tulsa) | 2021 |
| Tackles | 13, shared by: Kaiden Smith (Appalachian State); Jason Henderson (Old Dominion); R'Tarriun Johnson (Old Dominion) | 2020; 2021; 2021 |
| Tackles for loss | 3, shared by: Nick Hampton (Appalachian State); Jordan Young (Old Dominion); Bradley Weaver (Ohio); Martavius French (UTSA) | 2020; 2021; 2023; 2024 |
| Sacks | 2.5, Rodney McGraw (Western Michigan) | 2025 |
| Interceptions | 1, shared by multiple people; most recent: Caleb Offord (Kennesaw State); Joey Pope (Western Michigan); Tate Hallock (Western Michigan) | 2025 |
| Long Plays | Record, Player, Team | Year |
| Touchdown run | 70 yds., Marcus Williams Jr. (Appalachian State) | 2020 |
| Touchdown pass | 82 yds., Amari Odom (Kennesaw State) | 2025 |
| Kickoff return | 100 yds., LaMareon James (Old Dominion) | 2021 |
| Punt return | 15 yds., Keegan Wilburn (Georgia Southern) | 2023 |
| Interception return | 75 yds., Joey Pope (Western Michigan) | 2025 |
| Fumble return | 47 yds., Kershawn Fisher (Western Michigan) | 2025 |
| Punt | 56 yds., Caile Hogan (UTSA) | 2024 |
| Field goal | 38 yds., Tate Sandell (UTSA) | 2024 |
