= Lance Taylor (American football) =

American football player and coach (born 1981)

Current position
- Title: Head coach
- Team: Western Michigan
- Conference: MAC
- Record: 28–22

Biographical details
- Born: July 17, 1981 (age 45); Mount Vernon, Alabama, U.S.

Playing career
- 2000–2003: Alabama
- 2004: Colorado Crush
- 2005: Columbus Destroyers
- 2005: Green Bay Blizzard
- 2006: Louisville Fire
- Position: Wide receiver

Coaching career (HC unless noted)
- 2007–2008: Alabama (GA)
- 2009: Appalachian State (WR)
- 2010: New York Jets (intern)
- 2011: New York Jets (QC)
- 2012: New York Jets (QC/asst. TE)
- 2013: Carolina Panthers (asst. WR)
- 2014–2016: Stanford (RB)
- 2017–2018: Carolina Panthers (WR)
- 2019–2020: Notre Dame (RB)
- 2021: Notre Dame (RB/RGC)
- 2022: Louisville (OC)
- 2023–present: Western Michigan

Head coaching record
- Overall: 28–22
- Bowls: 1–1

Accomplishments and honors

Championships
- MAC (2025)

Awards
- FootballScoop.com Running Backs Coach of the Year (2015); MAC Coach of the Year (2025)

Lance Eugene Taylor (born July 17, 1981) is an American football coach and former player. He is the head football coach for Western Michigan University, a position he has held since 2023.

== Playing career ==
Taylor was a walk-on wide receiver for Alabama from 1999 to 2002, where he played under four different head coaches: Mike DuBose, Dennis Franchione, Mike Price, and Mike Shula. He eventually would play in 38 consecutive games as a wide receiver and earn a scholarship. As a senior, Taylor was a special-teams captain.

Taylor played professional football for the Colorado Crush and Columbus Destroyers of the Arena Football League, and the Green Bay Blizzard and the Louisville Fire of the AF2. An ACL injury ultimately ended his playing career. The reconstructive procedure was performed by Dr. James Andrews.

== Coaching career ==
=== Stanford ===
Taylor served as the running backs coach for Stanford from 2014 through 2016. During his tenure he coached Heisman Trophy runner-ups Christian McCaffrey and Bryce Love. His team won the 2016 Rose Bowl and the 2015 Pac-12 Football Championship. During the 2015 season, Taylor was named the Running Backs Coach of the Year by FootballScoop.com.

=== Notre Dame ===
Following two years in the National Football League (NFL) with the Carolina Panthers, Taylor was named running backs coach for Notre Dame in 2019. The team made the College Football Playoff in 2020 and also made an appearance in the 2020 ACC Championship Game. Following the 2020 season, he was promoted to run game coordinator.

=== Louisville ===
Despite rumors that Taylor would be retained by Notre Dame following the departure of Brian Kelly, it was announced that Taylor would be leaving the Fighting Irish to become Louisville's next offensive coordinator under coach Scott Satterfield.

=== Western Michigan ===
On December 8, 2022, Taylor was hired as the 17th head football coach at Western Michigan.

== Personal life ==
Taylor is from Mount Vernon, Alabama, where he graduated from Citronelle High School as class salutatorian. He graduated with a bachelor's degree in business management in 2003 from the University of Alabama. He is married to his wife Jamie and has two children, son Jet and daughter Jemma.

Taylor's father, James, played for Bear Bryant at Alabama, where he was a member of three SEC championship teams, including the 1973 team that was recognized as national champions by the UPI Coaches Poll. In 2015, James was named to the Mobile Sports Hall of Fame.

Taylor is a member of the MOWA Band of Choctaw Indians, a state-recognized Native American tribe in Alabama. As of December 2022, he is the only NCAA Division I head football coach who is Native American.

== Head coaching record ==
Year	Team	Overall	Conference	Standing	Bowl/playoffs
Western Michigan Broncos (Mid-American Conference) (2023–present)
2023	Western Michigan	4–8	3–5	T–4th (West)	
2024	Western Michigan	6–7	5–3	5th	L Salute to Veterans
2025	Western Michigan	10–4	7–1	1st	W Myrtle Beach
2026	Western Michigan	8–3	6–1		
Western Michigan:		28–22	21–10		
Total:		28–22			
