= 2025 Myrtle Beach Bowl =

Postseason college football bowl game

2025 Myrtle Beach Bowl presented by Engine
- 6th Myrtle Beach Bowl
Kennesaw State Owls	Western Michigan Broncos
(10–3)	(9–4)
CUSA	MAC
6	41
Head coach: Jerry Mack	Head coach: Lance Taylor
	1	2	3	4	Total
Kennesaw State	0	0	6	0	6
Western Michigan	27	7	7	0	41
- Date: December 19, 2025
- Season: 2025
- Stadium: Brooks Stadium
- Location: Conway, South Carolina
- MVP: Jalen Buckley (RB, Western Michigan)
- Favorite: Western Michigan by 3.5
- Referee: Jeremy Parker (Sun Belt)
- Attendance: 9,139

United States TV coverage
- Network: ESPN
- Announcers: Matt Schumacker (play-by-play), Dustin Fox (analyst), and Marilyn Payne (sideline)

The 2025 Myrtle Beach Bowl was a college football bowl game played on December 19, 2025, at Brooks Stadium in Conway, South Carolina. The sixth annual Myrtle Beach Bowl began at 11 a.m. EST and aired on ESPN. The Myrtle Beach Bowl was one of the 2025–26 bowl games concluding the 2025 FBS football season. The game is sponsored by Engine, a corporate business travel platform, and is officially named the Myrtle Beach Bowl presented by Engine.

The Myrtle Beach Bowl featured two conference champions—the Kennesaw State Owls (10–3) from Conference USA, and the Western Michigan Broncos (9–4) from the Mid-American Conference. Western Michigan beat Kennesaw State by a score of 41–6.

== Teams ==
This was the first meeting between Kennesaw State and Western Michigan.

=== Kennesaw State Owls ===
Kennesaw State opened their season with back-to-back losses, then won seven games in a row. After a loss to Jacksonville State, the Owls finished their regular season with two consecutive wins, then won the 2025 Conference USA Football Championship Game in a rematch with Jacksonville State. Kennesaw State entered the Myrtle Beach Bowl with a 10–3 record.

=== Western Michigan Broncos ===
Western Michigan opened their regular season with three consecutive losses, then rallied to win eight of their final nine games, losing only to Miami (OH) on October 25. The Broncos then won the 2025 MAC Football Championship Game in a rematch with Miami (OH). Western Michigan entered the Myrtle Beach Bowl with a 9–4 record.

== Game summary ==
2025 Myrtle Beach Bowl

Quarter	1	2	3	4	Total
Kennesaw State	0	0	6	0	6
Western Michigan	27	7	7	0	41

at Brooks Stadium • Conway, South Carolina

- Date: Friday, December 19, 2025
- Game time: 11:00 a.m. EST
- Game weather: Sunny • Temperature: 65 °F (18 °C) • Wind: 14 mph (23 km/h) west
- Game attendance: 9,139
- Referee: Jeremy Parker
- TV announcers (ESPN): Matt Schumacker (play-by-play), Dustin Fox (analyst), and Marilyn Payne (sideline)
- Box score

=== Statistics ===
Statistics	KENN	WMU
First downs	18	18
Plays–yards	60–378	62–423
Rushes–yards	34–169	43–303
Passing yards	209	120
Passing: comp–att–int	18–36–2	12–19–1
Turnovers		
Time of possession	25:44	34:16

Team	Category	Player	Statistics
Kennesaw State	Passing	Amari Odom	18/35, 349 yards, 1 TD, 2 INT
Kennesaw State	Rushing	Chase Belcher	16 carries, 148 yards
Kennesaw State	Receiving	Javon Rogers	3 receptions, 111 yards, 1 TD
Western Michigan	Passing	Broc Lowry	12/19, 120 yards, 2 TD, 1 INT
Western Michigan	Rushing	Jalen Buckley	8 carries, 174 yards, 1 TD
Western Michigan	Receiving	Blake Bosma	5 receptions, 44 yards, 1 TD
