= 2025 Pac-12 Conference football season =

American college football season

- League: NCAA Division I Football Bowl Subdivision
- Sport: Football
- Teams: 2
- TV partner(s): CBS, The CW, ESPN

2026 NFL draft

Regular season

Seasons
- ← 2024 2026 →

2025 Pac-12 Conference football standings
	Conf.			Overall
Team	W		L	W		L
Washington State	1	–	0	7	–	6
Oregon State	0	–	1	2	–	10
Rankings from CFP Rankings

The 2025 Pac-12 Conference football season was the 47th season of Pac-12 football, taking place during the 2025 NCAA Division I FBS football season. Two teams competed in the conference—Oregon State and Washington State.

On April 29, home football schedules were announced after a media rights deal between ESPN, CBS, and The CW was agreed to by the conference. The season began on August 30, when both teams played their first regular-season game. The season ended on December 22, when Washington State competed in the Famous Idaho Potato Bowl.

This was the final year of the stand-alone membership of Oregon State and Washington State following the conference realignment, as an additional six football members were set to join conference for the 2026 season. The previous football alliance that Oregon State and Washington State had entered with the Mountain West Conference (MWC) for the 2024 season was not renewed for 2025.

== Preseason ==
=== Recruiting classes ===
National rankings
Team	Rivals	24/7	Total signees
Oregon State	No. 63	No. 65	20
Washington State	No. 74	No. 67	35

=== Coaching ===
On January 9, 2025, Washington State named Jimmy Rogers as head coach replacing Jake Dickert who accepted the same position at Wake Forest.

Note: All stats current through the completion of the 2024 season

Team	Head coach	Year at school	Overall record	Record at school	Pac-12 record	Conference championships
Oregon State	Trent Bray	2	5–7	5–7	1–0	0
Washington State	Jimmy Rogers	1	27–3	0–0	1–0	0

== Schedule ==
Index to colors and formatting
Pac-12 member won
Pac-12 member lost
Pac-12 teams in **bold**

All times Pacific time.

† denotes Homecoming game

Rankings reflect those of the AP poll for weeks 1 through 9. Rankings from Week 10 until the end of the Season reflect those of the College Football Playoff Rankings.

=== Regular season ===
==== Week One ====
Date	Time	Visiting team	Home team	Site	TV	Result	Attendance	Ref.
August 30	7:00 p.m.	No. 12 (FCS) Idaho	**Washington State**	Martin Stadium • Pullman, WA (Battle of the Palouse)	The CW	**W** 13–10	28,243	
August 30	7:30 p.m.	California	**Oregon State**	Reser Stadium • Corvallis, OR	ESPN	**L** 15–34	31,630	
^{#}Rankings from AP Poll released prior to game. All times are in Pacific Time.

==== Week Two ====
Date	Time	Visiting team	Home team	Site	TV	Result	Attendance	Ref.
September 6	12:30 p.m.	Fresno State	**Oregon State**	Reser Stadium • Corvallis, OR	The CW	**L** 27–36	28,068	
September 6	7:15 p.m.	San Diego State	**Washington State**	Martin Stadium • Pullman, WA	The CW	**W** 36–13	24,330	
^{#}Rankings from AP Poll released prior to game. All times are in Pacific Time.

==== Week Three ====
Date	Time	Visiting team	Home team	Site	TV	Result	Attendance	Ref.
September 13	12:30 p.m.	**Oregon State**	No. 21 Texas Tech	Jones AT&T Stadium • Lubbock, TX	FOX	**L** 14–45	60,229	
September 13	12:30 p.m.	**Washington State**	North Texas	DATCU Stadium • Denton, TX	ESPNU	**L** 10–59	26,837	
^{#}Rankings from AP Poll released prior to game. All times are in Pacific Time.

==== Week Four ====
Date	Time	Visiting team	Home team	Site	TV	Result	Attendance	Ref.
September 20	4:30 p.m.	Washington	**Washington State**	Martin Stadium • Pullman, WA (Apple Cup)	CBS	**L** 24–59	32,952	
September 20	12:00 p.m.	**Oregon State**	No. 6 Oregon	Autzen Stadium • Eugene, OR (rivalry)	BTN	**L** 7–41	58,571	
^{#}Rankings from AP Poll released prior to game. All times are in Pacific Time.

==== Week Five ====
Date	Time	Visiting team	Home team	Site	TV	Result	Attendance	Ref.
September 26	7:30 p.m.	Houston	**Oregon State**	Reser Stadium • Corvallis, OR	ESPN	**L** 24–27 ^{OT}	29,338	
September 27	4:30 p.m.	**Washington State**	Colorado State	Canvas Stadium • Fort Collins, CO	CBSSN	**W** 20–3	32,087	
^{#}Rankings from AP Poll released prior to game. All times are in Pacific Time.

==== Week Six ====
Date	Time	Visiting team	Home team	Site	TV	Result	Attendance	Ref.
October 4	12:30 p.m.	**Oregon State**	Appalachian State	Kidd Brewer Stadium • Boone, NC	ESPN+	**L** 23–27	35,021	
^{#}Rankings from AP Poll released prior to game. All times are in Pacific Time.

Date	Bye Week
October 4	Washington State

==== Week Seven ====
Date	Time	Visiting team	Home team	Site	TV	Result	Attendance	Ref.
October 11	9:45 a.m.	**Washington State**	No. 4 Ole Miss	Vaught–Hemingway Stadium • Oxford, MS	SECN	**L** 21–24	66,392	
October 11	12:30 p.m.	Wake Forest	**Oregon State**	Reser Stadium • Corvallis, OR	The CW	**L** 14–39	29,710	
^{#}Rankings from AP Poll released prior to game. All times are in Pacific Time.

==== Week Eight ====
Date	Time	Visiting team	Home team	Site	TV	Result	Attendance	Ref.
October 18	3:30 p.m.	**Washington State**	Virginia	Scott Stadium • Charlottesville, VA	The CW	**L** 20–22	56,048	
October 18	7:00 p.m.	Lafayette	**Oregon State**	Reser Stadium • Corvallis, OR	The CW	**W** 45–13	27,735	
^{#}Rankings from AP Poll released prior to game. All times are in Pacific Time.

==== Week Nine ====
Date	Time	Visiting team	Home team	Site	TV	Result	Attendance	Ref.
October 25	12:30 p.m.	Toledo	**Washington State**	Martin Stadium • Pullman, WA	The CW	**W** 28–7	27,646	
^{#}Rankings from AP Poll released prior to game. All times are in Pacific Time.

Date	Bye Week
October 25	Oregon State

==== Week Ten ====
Date	Time	Visiting team	Home team	Site	TV	Result	Attendance	Ref.
November 1	4:30 p.m.	**Washington State**	**Oregon State**	Reser Stadium • Corvallis, OR	CBS	**OSU** 10–7	32,905	
^{#}Rankings from AP Poll released prior to game. All times are in Pacific Time.

==== Week Eleven ====
Date	Time	Visiting team	Home team	Site	TV	Result	Attendance	Ref.
November 8	7:00 p.m.	Sam Houston	**Oregon State**	Reser Stadium • Corvallis, OR	The CW	**L** 17–21	31,626	
^{#}Rankings from College Football Playoff. All times are in Pacific Time.

Date	Bye Week
November 8	Washington State

==== Week Twelve ====
Date	Time	Visiting team	Home team	Site	TV	Result	Attendance	Ref.
November 15	10:00 a.m.	**Oregon State**	Tulsa	Skelly Field at H. A. Chapman Stadium • Tulsa, OK	ESPN+	**L** 14–31	15,034	
November 15	7:00 p.m.	Louisiana Tech	**Washington State**	Martin Stadium • Pullman, WA	The CW	**W** 28–3	21,186	
^{#}Rankings from College Football Playoff. All times are in Pacific Time.

==== Week Thirteen ====
Date	Time	Visiting team	Home team	Site	TV	Result	Attendance	Ref.
November 22	10:00 a.m.	**Washington State**	James Madison	Bridgeforth Stadium • Harrisonburg, VA	ESPN+	**L** 20–24	25,156	
^{#}Rankings from College Football Playoff. All times are in Pacific Time.

Date	Bye Week
November 22	Oregon State

==== Week Fourteen ====
Date	Time	Visiting team	Home team	Site	TV	Result	Attendance	Ref.
November 29	3:30 p.m.	**Oregon State**	**Washington State**	Martin Stadium • Pullman, WA	The CW	**WSU** 32–8	24,806	
^{#}Rankings from College Football Playoff. All times are in Pacific Time.
