= 2025 Citrus Bowl =

Postseason college football bowl game

2025 Cheez-It Citrus Bowl
- 80th Citrus Bowl
| Michigan Wolverines | Texas Longhorns |
| (9–3) | (9–3) |
| Big Ten | SEC |
| 27 | 41 |
| Head coach: Biff Poggi (interim) | Head coach: Steve Sarkisian |
| AP / Coaches / CFP; 18 / 17 / 18 | AP / Coaches / CFP; 14 / 14 / 13 |
| | 1 | 2 | 3 | 4 | Total |
|---|---|---|---|---|---|
| Michigan | 10 | 7 | 3 | 7 | 27 |
| Texas | 3 | 14 | 7 | 17 | 41 |
- Date: December 31, 2025
- Season: 2025
- Stadium: Camping World Stadium
- Location: Orlando, Florida
- MVP: Arch Manning (QB, Texas)
- Favorite: Texas by 7
- Referee: Mike Roche (ACC)
- Attendance: 47,316

United States TV coverage
- Network: ABC; ESPN Radio
- Announcers: Mark Jones (play-by-play), Roddy Jones (analyst), and Alyssa Lang (sideline) (ABC); Troy Clardy (play-by-play), Je'Rod Cherry (analyst), and Marilyn Payne (sideline) (ESPN Radio)

The 2025 Citrus Bowl was a college football bowl game played on December 31, 2025, at Camping World Stadium in Orlando, Florida. The 80th annual Citrus Bowl began at approximately 3:00 p.m. EST and aired on ABC. The Citrus Bowl was one of the 2025–26 bowl games concluding the 2025 FBS football season. The game was sponsored by Cheez-It crackers and officially known as the Cheez-It Citrus Bowl.

The No. 13 Texas Longhorns from the Southeastern Conference (SEC) defeated the No. 18 Michigan Wolverines from the Big Ten Conference, 41–27.

== Teams ==
Consistent with conference tie-ins, the game featured teams from the Big Ten Conference and Southeastern Conference (SEC). On December 7, bowl organizers announced Texas and Michigan as the 2025 participants. This was the third matchup between the teams, with Texas having won both prior meetings, the 2005 Rose Bowl and a regular-season game during the 2024 season. Michigan had previously appeared in the Citrus Bowl six times, with four victories, while this was the first appearance for Texas.

=== Michigan Wolverines ===
Michigan finished with a 9–3 overall record (7–2 in Big Ten play) during the regular season. They faced two ranked teams during the season, No. 18 Oklahoma and No. 1 Ohio State, losing to both. The Wolverines entered the Citrus Bowl ranked 18th in the final College Football Playoff (CFP) rankings. On December 10, Michigan announced head coach Sherrone Moore had been fired due to "credible evidence" he had engaged in an inappropriate relationship with a staff member. The Wolverines subsequently announced that Biff Poggi would serve as interim head coach during the bowl game. Prior the bowl, first-year offensive coordinator Chip Lindsey also left the program, taking the same position at Missouri.

Prior to the game, multiple Michigan players announced they would opt-out of the bowl game. Derrick Moore, Jaishawn Barham, and Giovanni El-Hadi declared for the 2026 NFL draft, while Jordan Marshall, Justice Haynes, Ernest Hausmann, Andrew Sprague, Evan Link, Max Bredeson, and Rod Moore did not participate due to injuries.

=== Texas Longhorns ===
Texas also finished with an overall regular-season record of 9–3 (6–2 in SEC play). The Longhorns opened the season ranked No. 1 in the AP poll. They suffered losses to No. 3 Ohio State and unranked Florida before beating No. 6 Oklahoma and No. 9 Vanderbilt. A 35–10 loss to Georgia in mid-November dashed the Longhorns' CFP chances. Despite their rivalry week upset of unbeaten No. 3 Texas A&M, Texas finished as the highest-ranked SEC team outside of the playoff bracket. The Longhorns entered the Citrus Bowl ranked 13th in the final CFP rankings.

Prior to the game, 19 Longhorn players announced they would opt-out of the bowl game due to their intention to enter the transfer portal or declare for the NFL draft. These players included CJ Baxter, Quintrevion Wisner, Michael Taaffe, Anthony Hill Jr., Malik Muhammad, and Ethan Burke.

== Game summary ==
2025 Cheez-It Citrus Bowl

| Quarter | 1 | 2 | 3 | 4 | Total |
|---|---|---|---|---|---|
| No. 18 Michigan | 10 | 7 | 3 | 7 | 27 |
| No. 13 Texas | 3 | 14 | 7 | 17 | 41 |

at Camping World Stadium • Orlando, Florida

- Date: Wednesday, December 31, 2025
- Game time: 3:00 p.m. EST
- Game weather: Sunny • Temperature: 57 °F (14 °C) • Wind: 9 mph (14 km/h) northwest
- Game attendance: 47,316
- Referee: Mike Roche (ACC)
- TV announcers (ABC): Mark Jones (play-by-play), Roddy Jones (analyst), and Alyssa Lang (sideline)
- Box score

Game information

First quarter

- (12:05) TEX – Mason Shipley 43-yard field goal (Drive: 9 plays, 50 yards, 2:55; TEX 3–0)
- (4:01) MICH – Dominic Zvada 53-yard field goal (Drive: 9 plays, 40 yards, 3:49; Tied 3–3)
- (3:18) MICH – Kendrick Bell 19-yard pass from Bryce Underwood (Dominic Zvada kick) (Drive: 3 plays, 23 yards, 0:41; MICH 10–3)

Second quarter

- (13:43) TEX – Christian Clark 3-yard run (Mason Shipley kick) (Drive: 11 plays, 75 yards, 4:32; Tied 10–10)
- (10:17) MICH – Andrew Marsh 4-yard pass from Bryce Underwood (Dominic Zvada kick) (Drive: 7 plays, 69 yards, 3:19; MICH 17–10)
- (7:41) TEX – Jack Endries 17-yard pass from Arch Manning (Mason Shipley kick) (Drive: 8 plays, 74 yards, 2:31; Tied 17–17)

Third quarter

- (9:37) MICH – Dominic Zvada 31-yard field goal (Drive: 12 plays, 41 yards, 5:13; MICH 20–17)
- (5:38) TEX – Arch Manning 23-yard run (Mason Shipley kick) (Drive: 9 plays, 80 yards, 3:55; TEX 24–20)

Fourth quarter

- (10:56) MICH – Bryce Underwood 5-yard run (Dominic Zvada kick) (Drive: 11 plays, 45 yards, 5:20; MICH 27–24)
- (6:58) TEX – Kaliq Lockett 30-yard pass from Arch Manning (Mason Shipley kick) (Drive: 9 plays, 75 yards, 4:02; TEX 31–27)
- (5:06) TEX – Arch Manning 60-yard run (Mason Shipley kick) (Drive: 1 play, 60 yards, 0:09; TEX 38–27)
- (3:38) TEX – Mason Shipley 51-yard field goal (Drive: 4 plays, 1 yard, 0:55; TEX 41–27)

Texas opened the scoring in the first quarter via a 43-yard field goal by Mason Shipley. Michigan scored ten points in the quarter via a 53-yard field goal by Dominic Zvada and a 19-yard touchdown pass from Bryce Underwood to Kendrick Bell, to take their first lead of the game. Texas tied the game in the second quarter via a three-yard touchdown run by Christian Clark. Michigan responded with a four-yard touchdown pass from Underwood to Andrew Marsh to regain the lead. Texas scored the final points of the half via a 17-yard touchdown pass from Arch Manning to Jack Endries. The score was tied, 17–17, at halftime. Michigan opened the scoring in the second half via a 31-yard field goal by Zvada. Texas responded with a 23-yard touchdown run by Manning to regain the lead. Michigan regained the lead in the fourth quarter via a five-yard touchdown run by Underwood. Texas responded with 17 unanswered points in the quarter via a 30-yard touchdown pass from Manning to Kaliq Lockett, a 60-yard touchdown run by Manning, and a 51-yard field goal by Shipley. The game featured seven lead changes. Texas' defense forced three turnovers in the final 18 minutes of the game to secure the Citrus Bowl title.

=== Statistics ===
| Statistics | MICH | TEX |
|---|---|---|
| First downs | 19 | 24 |
| Plays–yards | 73–373 | 76–456 |
| Rushes–yards | 38–174 | 33–235 |
| Passing yards | 199 | 221 |
| Passing: comp–att–int | 23–42–3 | 21–34–0 |
| Turnovers | 3 | 1 |
| Time of possession | 33:08 | 26:52 |

| Team | Category | Player | Statistics |
|---|---|---|---|
| Michigan | Passing | Bryce Underwood | 22–37, 191 yards, 2 TD, 2 INT |
| Michigan | Rushing | Bryson Kuzdzal | 20 carries, 82 yards |
| Michigan | Receiving | Donaven McCulley | 4 receptions, 54 yards |
| Texas | Passing | Arch Manning | 21–34, 221 yards, 2 TD |
| Texas | Rushing | Arch Manning | 9 carries, 155 yards, 2 TD |
| Texas | Receiving | Ryan Wingo | 4 receptions, 64 yards |
