= 2025 Famous Idaho Potato Bowl =

Postseason college football bowl game

- 29th Famous Idaho Potato Bowl
Washington State Cougars	Utah State Aggies
(6–6)	(6–6)
Pac-12	Mountain West
34	21
Head coach: Jesse Bobbit (interim)	Head coach: Bronco Mendenhall
	1	2	3	4	Total
Washington State	7	7	6	14	34
Utah State	0	0	7	14	21
- Date: December 22, 2025
- Season: 2025
- Stadium: Albertsons Stadium
- Location: Boise, Idaho
- MVP: Josh Meredith (WR, Washington State)
- Favorite: Utah State by 1.5
- Referee: Garrett Dickerson (CUSA)
- Attendance: 17,031

United States TV coverage
- Network: ESPN
- Announcers: Chuckie Kempf (play-by-play), Darius Walker (analyst), and Tori Petry (sideline reporter)

International TV coverage
- Network: ESPN Brazil
- Announcers: Matheus Ornellas (play-by-play) and Weinny Eirado (analyst)

The 2025 Famous Idaho Potato Bowl was a college football bowl game played on December 22, 2025, at Albertsons Stadium in Boise, Idaho. The game began at approximately 12:00 p.m. MST and aired on ESPN. The Famous Idaho Potato Bowl was one of the 2025–26 bowl games concluding the 2025 FBS football season. The game was sponsored by the Idaho Potato Commission.

The contest featured the Washington State Cougars (6–6) from the Pac-12 Conference and the Utah State Aggies (6–6) from the Mountain West Conference. Washington State beat Utah State, 34–21.

== Teams ==
Based on conference tie-ins, the game was expected to feature teams from the Mid-American Conference (MAC) and the Mountain West Conference. The announced matchup was for a Mountain West team, Utah State, and a team from the Pac-12 Conference, Washington State. This was the sixth meeting between the two programs; they first played in 1949. Entering the bowl, Washington State held a 3–2 lead in the series.

=== Utah State Aggies ===
Utah State opened their season with three wins in their first four games, then lost back-to-back contests, giving then a 3–3 record at mid-October. The Aggies then alternated wins and losses over their final six games to finish the regular season with a 6–6 record.

=== Washington State Cougars ===
Washington State won three of their first five games, then suffered back-to-back losses against ranked opponents, giving them a 3–4 record with five games remaining. The Cougars won three of those games to finish the regular season with a 6–6 record. Washington State was led in the bowl game by interim head coach Jesse Bobbit; he took over for Jimmy Rogers, who coached the Cougars during the regular season before leaving the program to accept the head coaching job at Iowa State.

== Game summary ==
The game was played while Albertsons Stadium's north end zone project was under construction.

2025 Famous Idaho Potato Bowl

Quarter	1	2	3	4	Total
Washington State	7	7	6	14	34
Utah State	0	0	7	14	21

at Albertsons Stadium • Boise, Idaho

- Date: Monday, December 22, 2025
- Game time: 12:00 p.m. MST
- Game weather: Sunny • Temperature: 48 °F (9 °C)
- Game attendance: 17,031
- Referee: Garrett Dickerson
- TV announcers (ESPN): Chuckie Kempf (play-by-play), Darius Walker (analyst), and Tori Petry (sideline reporter)
- Box score

=== Statistics ===
Statistics	WSU	USU
First downs	30	13
Plays–yards	88–628	53–254
Rushes–yards	41–255	26–60
Passing yards	373	194
Passing: comp–att–int	28–47–3	14–27–1
Time of possession	35:48	24:12

Team	Category	Player	Statistics
Washington State	Passing	Zevi Eckhaus	26/44, 334 yards, 3 TD, 3 INT
Washington State	Rushing	Maxwell Woods	9 carries, 117 yards
Washington State	Receiving	Joshua Meredith	8 receptions, 84 yards
Utah State	Passing	Bryson Barnes	9/21, 116 yards, 1 INT
Utah State	Rushing	Javen Jacobs	3 carries, 24 yards
Utah State	Receiving	Brady Boyd	4 receptions, 99 yards, 1 TD
