= 2025 New Orleans Bowl =

Postseason college football bowl game

- 25th New Orleans Bowl
Western Kentucky Hilltoppers	Southern Miss Golden Eagles
(8–4)	(7–5)
CUSA	Sun Belt
27	16
Head coach: Tyson Helton	Head coach: Blake Anderson
	1	2	3	4	Total
Western Kentucky	3	3	7	14	27
Southern Miss	7	6	3	0	16
- Date: December 23, 2025
- Season: 2025
- Stadium: Caesars Superdome
- Location: New Orleans, Louisiana
- MVP: Maverick McIvor (QB, Western Kentucky)
- Favorite: Western Kentucky by 2.5
- Referee: Christian Watson (Mountain West)
- Attendance: 16,693

United States TV coverage
- Network: ESPN; ESPN Radio
- Announcers: Courtney Lyle (play-by-play), Rene Ingoglia (analyst), and Ian Fitzsimmons (sideline) (ESPN); Matt Jones (play-by-play) and Myron Medcalf (analyst) (ESPN Radio)

The 2025 New Orleans Bowl was a college football bowl game played on December 23, 2025, at Caesars Superdome in New Orleans, Louisiana. The 25th annual New Orleans Bowl game, it began at approximately 4:30 p.m. CST and aired on ESPN. The New Orleans Bowl was one of the 2025–26 bowl games concluding the 2025 FBS football season.

The 2025 New Orleans Bowl featured the Western Kentucky Hilltoppers from Conference USA and the Southern Miss Golden Eagles from the Sun Belt Conference. Western Kentucky beat Southern Miss, 27–16.

== Teams ==
Consistent with conference tie-ins, the game featured a team from Conference USA, Western Kentucky, and a team from the Sun Belt Conference, Southern Miss. This was the fifth meeting between programs; each prior meeting had been won by Western Kentucky.

=== Western Kentucky Hilltoppers ===
Western Kentucky began their season with five wins in their first six games, then won three of their next four games; their record stood at 8–2 at mid-November. The Hilltoppers suffered back-to-back losses in their final two regular-season games, and entered the New Orleans Bowl with an 8–4 record.

=== Southern Miss Golden Eagles ===
Southern Miss had two losses in their first four games, then won five games in a row to improve their record to 7–2 in early November. The Golden Eagles ended their regular season with three consecutive losses, and entered the New Orleans Bowl with a 7–5 record.

== Game summary ==
2025 New Orleans Bowl

Quarter	1	2	3	4	Total
Western Kentucky	3	3	7	14	27
Southern Miss	7	6	3	0	16

at Caesars Superdome • New Orleans, Louisiana

- Date: Tuesday, December 23, 2025
- Game time: 4:30 p.m. CST
- Game weather: n/a (indoor)
- Game attendance: 16,693
- Referee: Christian Watson
- TV announcers (ESPN): Courtney Lyle (play-by-play), Rene Ingoglia (analyst), and Ian Fitzsimmons (sideline)
- Box score

=== Statistics ===
Statistics	WKU	USM
First downs	18	21
Plays–yards	73–422	84–377
Rushes–yards	33–155	36–119
Passing yards	267	258
Passing: comp–att–int	22–40–2	24–48–1
Time of possession	31:24	28:39

Team	Category	Player	Statistics
Western Kentucky	Passing	Maverick McIvor	12/19, 199 yards, 1 INT
Western Kentucky	Rushing	Marvis Parrish	7 carries, 65 yards, 1 TD
Western Kentucky	Receiving	Matthew Henry	7 receptions, 126 yards
Southern Miss	Passing	Braylon Braxton	24/47, 258 yards, 1 TD, 1 INT
Southern Miss	Rushing	Jeffery Pittman	10 carries, 55 yards
Southern Miss	Receiving	Tychaun Chapman	3 receptions, 50 yards, 1 TD
