= 2026 Duke's Mayo Bowl (January) =

Postseason college football bowl game

- 24th Duke's Mayo Bowl
Wake Forest Demon Deacons	Mississippi State Bulldogs
(8–4)	(5–7)
ACC	SEC
43	29
Head coach: Jake Dickert	Head coach: Jeff Lebby
	1	2	3	4	Total
Wake Forest	15	0	15	13	43
Mississippi State	6	3	11	9	29
- Date: January 2, 2026
- Season: 2025
- Stadium: Bank of America Stadium
- Location: Charlotte, North Carolina
- MVP: Robby Ashford (QB, Wake Forest)
- Favorite: Mississippi State by 3.5
- Referee: Greg Blum (Big Ten)
- Attendance: 29,328

United States TV coverage
- Network: ESPN; ESPN Radio
- Announcers: Anish Shroff (play-by-play), Andre Ware (analyst), and Paul Carcaterra (sideline) (ESPN); Mike Couzens (play-by-play), Max Starks (analyst), and Marilyn Payne (sideline) (ESPN Radio)

The 2026 Duke's Mayo Bowl was a college football bowl game played on January 2, 2026, at Bank of America Stadium located in Charlotte, North Carolina. The 24th annual Duke's Mayo Bowl began at approximately 8:00 p.m. EST and aired on ESPN. It was one of the 2025–26 bowl games concluding the 2025 FBS football season. The game's title sponsor was Duke's Mayonnaise.

Wake Forest of the Atlantic Coast Conference (ACC) defeated Mississippi State of the Southeastern Conference (SEC), 43–29.

== Teams ==
The game featured Wake Forest of the Atlantic Coast Conference (ACC) and Mississippi State of the Southeastern Conference (SEC). The teams had one prior meeting, a win by Mississippi State in the 2011 Music City Bowl.

=== Wake Forest Demon Deacons ===
Wake Forest compiled an 8–4 record during the regular season, losing (in overtime) to one ranked team, Georgia Tech, and defeating one ranked team, Virginia. This marked a considerable turnaround from their 2024 campaign, where the Demon Deacons went 4-8. In the prior offseason, Wake Forest hired former Washington State head coach Jake Dickert as their next head coach.

=== Mississippi State Bulldogs ===
Mississippi State won their first four games, including a four-point win over ranked Arizona State, but then lost seven of their eight remaining games. Five defeats were to ranked teams—Tennessee, Texas A&M, Texas, Georgia, and Ole Miss. With a 5–7 record, the Bulldogs were not bowl eligible, but received a invitation due to some bowl-eligible teams opting out.

== Game summary ==
2026 Duke's Mayo Bowl

Quarter	1	2	3	4	Total
Wake Forest	15	0	15	13	43
Mississippi State	6	3	11	9	29

at Bank of America Stadium • Charlotte, North Carolina

- Date: Friday, January 2, 2026
- Game time: 8:00 p.m. EST
- Game weather: Cloudy • Temperature: 57 °F (14 °C) • Wind: 6 mph (9.7 km/h) northeast
- Game attendance: 29,328
- Referee: Gregory Blum
- TV announcers (ESPN): Anish Shroff (play-by-play), Andre Ware (analyst), and Paul Carcaterra (sideline)
- Box score

Game information

First quarter

- MSST – Kyle Ferrie 33-yard field goal, 12:55. Bulldogs 3–0. Drive: 7 plays, 60 yards, 2:05.
- WAKE – Kordell Bartley 100-yard kickoff return (Sawyer Racanelli-Eni Falayi pass), 12:33. Demon Deacons 8–3.
- MSST – Kyle Ferrie 50-yard field goal, 7:12. Demon Deacons 8–6. Drive: 6 plays, 42 yards, 2:00.
- WAKE – Kamrean Johnson 14-yard pass from Robby Ashford (Connor Calvert kick), 3:49. Demon Deacons 15–6. Drive: 9 plays, 75 yards, 3:23.

Second quarter

- MSST – Kyle Ferrie 23-yard field goal, 6:15. Demon Deacons 15–9. Drive: 10 plays, 56 yards, 5:11.

Third quarter

- WAKE – Jack Foley 64-yard pass from Robby Ashford (Robby Ashford run), 14:06. Demon Deacons 23–9. Drive: 3 plays, 75 yards, 0:54.
- MSST – Kyle Ferrie 36-yard field goal, 9:24. Demon Deacons 23–12. Drive: 5 plays, 15 yards, 2:07.
- WAKE – Robby Ashford 2-yard run (Connor Calvert kick), 4:19. Demon Deacons 30–12. Drive: 11 plays, 75 yards, 5:05.
- MSST – Kamario Taylor 1-yard run (Kamario Taylor–Seydou Traore pass), 0:00. Demon Deacons 30–20. Drive: 8 plays, 65 yards, 4:19.

Fourth quarter

- MSST – Sanfrisco Magee 42-yard pass from Kamario Taylor (Kyle Ferrie kick), 10:17. Demon Deacons 30–27. Drive: 4 plays, 84 yards, 1:09.
- WAKE – Robby Ashford 1-yard run (Connor Calvert kick BLOCKED), 4:07. Demon Deacons 36–27. Drive: 10 plays, 63 yards, 6:03.
- MSST – Kelley Jones defensive PAT conversion, 4:07. Demon Deacons 36–29.
- WAKE – Ty Clark III 62-yard pass from Robby Ashford (Connor Calvert kick), 2:15. Demon Deacons 43–29. Drive: 3 plays, 65 yards, 0:20.

=== Statistics ===
Statistics	WF	MSST
First downs	23	20
Plays–yards	68/451	69/408
Rushes–yards	35/148	42/114
Passing yards	303	294
Passing: comp–att–int	20/33/1	16/27/0
Turnovers		
Time of possession	31:35	28:25

Team	Category	Player	Statistics
Wake Forest	Passing	Robby Ashford	20/33, 303 yards, 3 TD, 1 INT
Wake Forest	Rushing	Ty Clark III	17 carries, 91 yards
Wake Forest	Receiving	Carlos Hernandez	6 receptions, 73 yards
Mississippi State	Passing	Kamario Taylor	13/22, 241 yards, 1 TD
Mississippi State	Rushing	Kamario Taylor	18 carries, 63 yards, 1 TD
Mississippi State	Receiving	Brenen Thompson	4 receptions, 106 yards
