= Jimmy Rogers (American football coach) =

American football coach (born 1987)

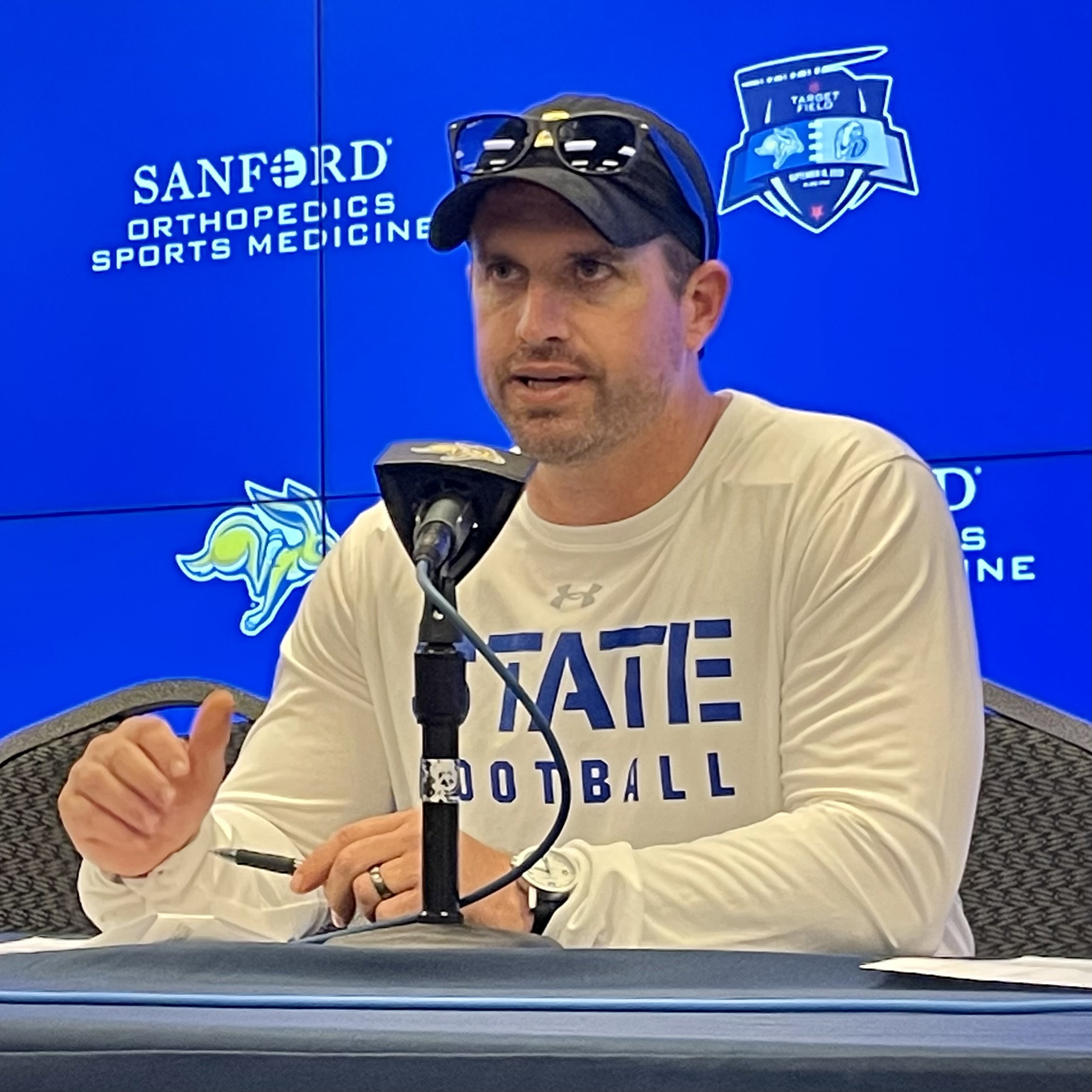
- Rogers at a post-game presser in 2023

Current position
- Title: Head coach
- Team: Iowa State
- Conference: Big 12
- Record: 5–6

Biographical details
- Born: March 13, 1987 (age 39); Chandler, Arizona, U.S.

Playing career
- 2005–2009: South Dakota State
- Position: Linebacker

Coaching career (HC unless noted)
- 2010–2011: South Dakota State (GA)
- 2012: Florida Atlantic (GA)
- 2013–2018: South Dakota State (LB)
- 2019–2021: South Dakota State (AHC/co-DC/LB)
- 2022: South Dakota State (AHC/DC/LB)
- 2023–2024: South Dakota State
- 2025: Washington State
- 2026–present: Iowa State

Head coaching record
- Overall: 38–15
- Tournaments: 6–1 (NCAA D-I playoffs)

Accomplishments and honors

Championships
- 1 NCAA Division I (2023); 2 MVFC (2023, 2024)

Awards
- Eddie Robinson Award (2023)

Jimmy Rogers (born March 13, 1987) is an American football coach and former linebacker who is currently the head football coach at Iowa State University. He previously served as the head coach at Washington State University in 2025, and at South Dakota State University from 2023 to 2024. Rogers played college football at South Dakota State from 2005 to 2009 and became a coach there in 2010.

Rogers led the Jackrabbits to an NCAA Division I Championship in his debut season and is a recipient of the Eddie Robinson Award.

== Early life and education ==
A native of Chandler, Arizona, Rogers attended Hamilton High School where he was a three-year letterman in football. He was the region defensive player of the year in 2004 and was named first-team all-state. He compiled 320 career tackles and also made 16 sacks and eight interceptions while helping the team win back-to-back state titles in his junior and senior years.

Rogers played college football for the South Dakota State Jackrabbits, enrolling in 2005 and spending his first year as a redshirt. As a redshirt freshman in 2006, he appeared in all 11 games and posted 43 tackles, placing ninth on the team. In a game against UC Davis that season, he recorded 15 tackles, the highest for any South Dakota State player on the year.

In 2007, Rogers started all 11 games and posted 110 tackles, leading both the team and the conference and earning first-team All-Great West Football Conference (GWFC) honors. He was named second-team All-Missouri Valley Football Conference (MVFC) as a junior in 2008 after starting all 12 games and recording 93 tackles. As a senior, Rogers was team captain and tallied 66 tackles, helping them reach the FCS playoffs. He finished his college career with 312 stops in 46 games played. He additionally forced three fumbles and intercepted three passes.

== Coaching career ==
=== Early career ===
Rogers began a coaching and playing career at career from South Dakota State, he was a linebacker on the team before joining the team as an graduate assistant from 2010 to 2011 at the school. He assisted the defensive backs in his first year before moving on to the linebackers in 2011, additionally assisting the special teams.

=== Florida Atlantic ===
In 2012, he became a graduate assistant for the Florida Atlantic Owls, working with the offensive line in his first year and spending early 2013 with the linebackers.

=== South Dakota State ===
Rogers returned to South Dakota State for the 2013 season and served as linebackers coach. After serving in the position from 2013 through 2018, he was given the additional roles of co-defensive coordinator and assistant head coach in 2019, while remaining linebackers coach. By the start of the 2022 season, Rogers had coached at least one 100-tackle linebacker in all but one of his nine years in the position. He became the sole defensive coordinator for the 2022 season and helped the Jackrabbits defense lead the FCS in rushing defense and interceptions, while having the third-lowest points allowed. He was named the FCS Coordinator of the Year as South Dakota State went on to win the NCAA Division I FCS National Championship beating North Dakota State.

John Stiegelmeier retired as SDSU's head coach following 26 seasons capped by the 2022 NCAA D-1 FCS National Championship and Rogers was named head coach of the Jackrabbits. Rogers was awarded the Eddie Robinson coach of the year in his first year as head coach for the Jackrabbits, leading them to a 15-0 record and a national championship.

=== Washington State ===
On December 28, 2024, Rogers was announced as Washington State head coach. He led the Cougars to a 6–6 season. He left Washington State University after one season with the team, breaking a five-year contract at WSU to lead Iowa State's football program under a six-year contract. He also led the Cougars to a bowl game; the fourth coach to do so in WSU history. Iowa State bought out Rogers' contract with WSU for $4 million.

=== Iowa State ===
On December 5, 2025, Rogers was named the head football coach at Iowa State University. On September 5, 2026, Rogers won his first game at Iowa State in week one, with a 38-10 victory over South East Missouri State. On September 19, 2026, under Rogers, Iowa State had the first game in school history with a kick and punt return touchdown, against Bowling Green in a 55-7 win.

== Personal life ==
Rogers is married and has two children.

== Head coaching record ==
=== College ===
Year	Team	Overall	Conference	Standing	Bowl/playoffs	Coaches^{#}	AP^{°}
South Dakota State Jackrabbits (Missouri Valley Football Conference) (2023–2024)
2023	South Dakota State	15–0	8–0	1st	W NCAA Division I Championship	1	1
2024	South Dakota State	12–3	7–1	T–1st	L NCAA Division I Semifinal	3	3
South Dakota State:		27–3	15–1				
Washington State Cougars (Pac-12 Conference) (2025)
2025	Washington State	6–6	1–0	1st	Famous Idaho Potato*		
Washington State:		6–6	1–0	*Did not coach bowl game			
Iowa State Cyclones (Big 12 Conference) (2026–present)
2026	Iowa State	5–6	3–5				
Iowa State:		5–6	3–5				
Total:		38–15					
National championship Conference title Conference division title or championship game berth
