= 2025 Western Michigan Broncos football team =

American college football season

2025 Western Michigan Broncos football

MAC champion Myrtle Beach Bowl champion

MAC Championship, W 23–13 vs. Miami (OH)

Myrtle Beach Bowl, W 41–6 vs. Kennesaw State
- Conference: Mid-American Conference
- Record: 10–4 (7–1 MAC)
- Head coach: Lance Taylor (3rd season)
- Offensive coordinator: Walt Bell (2nd season)
- Offensive scheme: Multiple
- Defensive coordinator: Chris O'Leary (1st season)
- Base defense: 4–3
- Home stadium: Waldo Stadium

2025 Mid-American Conference football standings
| | Conf. | | | Overall |
| Team | W | | L | W | | L |
|---|---|---|---|---|---|---|
| Western Michigan y$ | 7 | – | 1 | 10 | – | 4 |
| Miami (OH) y | 6 | – | 2 | 7 | – | 7 |
| Ohio | 6 | – | 2 | 9 | – | 4 |
| Toledo | 6 | – | 2 | 8 | – | 5 |
| Central Michigan | 5 | – | 3 | 7 | – | 6 |
| Akron* | 4 | – | 4 | 5 | – | 7 |
| Buffalo | 4 | – | 4 | 5 | – | 7 |
| Kent State | 4 | – | 4 | 5 | – | 7 |
| Eastern Michigan | 3 | – | 5 | 4 | – | 8 |
| Ball State | 3 | – | 5 | 4 | – | 8 |
| Bowling Green | 2 | – | 6 | 4 | – | 8 |
| Northern Illinois | 2 | – | 6 | 3 | – | 9 |
| UMass | 0 | – | 8 | 0 | – | 12 |
Championship: Western Michigan 23, Miami (OH) 13
$ – Conference champion; y – Championship game participant; * Ineligible for postseason play due to low APR score

The 2025 Western Michigan Broncos football team represented Western Michigan University in the Mid-American Conference (MAC) during the 2025 NCAA Division I FBS football season. The Broncos were led by Lance Taylor in his third-year as the head coach and the Broncos played their home games at Waldo Stadium, located in Kalamazoo, Michigan.

The Broncos claimed the team's fourth football league championship and became the first team in program history to win both a conference championship and a bowl game in the same season. With the program's third overall bowl victory, they reached 10 wins for just the second time.

== Preseason ==
The MAC Football Kickoff was held on Thursday, July 24, 2025 at the Ford Field in Detroit, Michigan from 9:00 am EDT to 1:30 pm EDT.

=== Preseason polls ===
==== Coaches Poll ====
On July 24 the MAC announced the preseason coaches' poll.

MAC Coaches poll
| Predicted finish | Team | Votes (1st place) |
| 1 | Toledo | 135 (7) |
| 2 | Miami | 131 (3) |
| 3 | Ohio | 123 (3) |
| 4 | Buffalo | 115 |
| 5 | Northern Illinois | 94 |
| 6 | Bowling Green | 81 |
| 7 | Western Michigan | 71 |
| 8 | Eastern Michigan | 68 |
| 9 | Central Michigan | 65 |
| 10 | Ball State | 41 |
| T11 | Akron | 39 |
| T11 | Massachusetts | 39 |
| 13 | Kent State | 12 |

Coaches poll (MAC Championship)
| Predicted finish | Team | Votes |
| 1 | Toledo | 6 |
| 2 | Miami | 4 |
| 3 | Ohio | 3 |

== Schedule ==
| Date | Time | Opponent | Site | TV | Result | Attendance |
|---|---|---|---|---|---|---|
| August 29 | 7:00 p.m. | at Michigan State* | Spartan Stadium; East Lansing, MI | FS1 | L 6–23 | 71,657 |
| September 6 | 3:30 p.m. | North Texas* | Waldo Stadium; Kalamazoo, MI | ESPN+ | L 30–33 ^{OT} | 20,051 |
| September 13 | 7:00 p.m. | at No. 9 Illinois* | Gies Memorial Stadium; Champaign, IL | FS1 | L 0–38 | 60,670 |
| September 20 | 3:30 p.m. | Toledo | Waldo Stadium; Kalamazoo, MI | ESPN+ | W 14–13 | 20,744 |
| September 27 | 6:30 p.m. | No. 6 (FCS) Rhode Island* | Waldo Stadium; Kalamazoo, MI | ESPN+ | W 47–14 | 20,191 |
| October 4 | 2:30 p.m. | at UMass | Warren McGuirk Alumni Stadium; Hadley, MA | ESPN+ | W 21–3 | 10,014 |
| October 11 | 3:30 p.m. | Ball State | Waldo Stadium; Kalamazoo, MI | ESPN+ | W 42–0 | 20,032 |
| October 25 | 3:30 p.m. | at Miami (OH) | Yager Stadium; Oxford, OH | ESPN+ | L 17–26 | 18,025 |
| November 1 | 4:00 p.m. | Central Michigan | Waldo Stadium; Kalamazoo, MI (rivalry, Michigan MAC Trophy) | ESPNU | W 24–21 | 29,299 |
| November 11 | 8:00 p.m. | Ohio | Waldo Stadium; Kalamazoo, MI | ESPN2 | W 17–13 | 10,849 |
| November 18 | 7:00 p.m. | at Northern Illinois | Huskie Stadium; DeKalb, IL | ESPN2 | W 35–19 | 4,734 |
| November 25 | 7:30 p.m. | at Eastern Michigan | Rynearson Stadium; Ypsilanti, MI (Michigan MAC Trophy) | ESPN2 | W 31–21 | 11,818 |
| December 6 | 12:00 p.m. | vs. Miami (OH) | Ford Field; Detroit, MI (MAC Championship Game) | ESPN | W 23–13 | 19,114 |
| December 19 | 11:00 a.m. | vs. Kennesaw State | Brooks Stadium; Conway, SC (Myrtle Beach Bowl) | ESPN | W 41–6 | 9,139 |
*Non-conference game; Rankings from AP Poll and CFP Rankings released prior to game; All times are in Eastern time

== Game summaries ==
=== at Michigan State ===
Western Michigan Broncos (0–0) at Michigan State Spartans (0–0) – Game summary

| Quarter | 1 | 2 | 3 | 4 | Total |
|---|---|---|---|---|---|
| Broncos | 0 | 0 | 0 | 6 | 6 |
| Spartans | 7 | 14 | 2 | 0 | 23 |

at Spartan Stadium • East Lansing, MI

- Date: August 29
- Game time: 7:00 p.m.
- Game weather: 68 °F (20 °C), Wind: 5 mph S, Sunny
- Game attendance: 71,657
- Referee: Jason Nickleby
- TV announcers (FS1): Dan Hellie (play-by-play) and Petros Papadakis (analyst)

Game information

First quarter

- MSU – Brandon Tullis 12-yard run (Blake Sislo kick), 5:30. Spartans 7–0. Drive: 10 plays, 74 yards, 5:42.

Second quarter

- MSU – Nick Marsh 7-yard pass from Aidan Chiles (Blake Sislo kick), 10:43. Spartans 14–0. Drive: 12 plays, 75 yards, 5:59.
- MSU – Makhi Frazier 9-yard run (Blake Sislo kick), 1:58. Spartans 21–0. Drive: 6 plays, 54 yards, 2:25.

Third quarter

- MSU – Team safety, 8:01. Spartans 23–0.

Fourth quarter

- WMU – Tate Hallock 32-yard interception return (pass failed), 2:51. Spartans 23–6. Drive: 4 plays, 77 yards, 0:23.

| Statistics | WMU | MSU |
|---|---|---|
| First downs | 10 | 20 |
| Plays–yards | 57–217 | 65–341 |
| Rushes–yards | 24–29 | 41–186 |
| Passing yards | 188 | 155 |
| Passing: Comp–Att–Int | 16–33–1 | 17–24–1 |
| Turnovers | 1 | 2 |
| Time of possession | 23:13 | 36:47 |

| Team | Category | Player | Statistics |
|---|---|---|---|
| Western Michigan | Passing | Brady Jones | 11/23, 97 yards, INT |
| Western Michigan | Rushing | Jalen Buckley | 9 carries, 21 yards |
| Western Michigan | Receiving | Baylin Brooks | 3 receptions, 85 yards |
| Michigan State | Passing | Aidan Chiles | 17/23, 155 yards, TD |
| Michigan State | Rushing | Makhi Frazier | 14 carries, 103 yards, TD |
| Michigan State | Receiving | Omari Kelly | 7 receptions, 75 yards |

=== vs North Texas ===
North Texas Mean Green (1–0) at Western Michigan Broncos (0–1) – Game summary

| Quarter | 1 | 2 | 3 | 4 | OT | Total |
|---|---|---|---|---|---|---|
| Mean Green | 0 | 7 | 10 | 10 | 6 | 33 |
| Broncos | 0 | 17 | 7 | 3 | 3 | 30 |

at Waldo Stadium • Kalamazoo, MI

- Date: September 6
- Game time: 3:30 PM EDT
- Game weather: Sunny • Temperature: 63 °F (17 °C) • Wind: E at 15 miles per hour (24 km/h)
- Game attendance: 20,051
- Referee: Rick Warne
- TV announcers (ESPN+): Evan Stockton (play-by-play) and Marcus Ray (analyst)

Game information

First quarter

- No scoring plays.

Second quarter

- WMU – Broc Lowry 25-yard run (Palmer Domschke kick), 13:33. Broncos 7–0. Drive: 9 plays, 61 yards, 4:34.
- UNT – Kiefer Sibley 10-yard run (Kali Nguma kick), 10:48. Tied 7–7. Drive: 8 plays, 68 yards, 2:45.
- WMU – Jalen Buckley 17-yard pass from Broc Lowry (Palmer Domschke kick), 8:08. Broncos 14–7. Drive: 5 plays, 64 yards, 2:40.
- WMU – Palmer Domschke 40-yard field goal, 0:00. Broncos 17–7. Drive: 10 plays, 30 yards, 2:54.

Third quarter

- UNT – Kali Nguma 22-yard field goal, 10:37. Broncos 17–10. Drive: 13 plays, 68 yards, 4:18.
- WMU – Broc Lowry 8-yard run (Palmer Domschke kick), 6:33. Broncos 24–10. Drive: 7 plays, 41 yards, 3:54.
- UNT – Tre Williams III 18-yard pass from Drew Mestemaker (Kali Nguma kick), 4:40. Broncos 24–17. Drive: 4 plays, 67 yards, 1:48.

Fourth quarter

- WMU – Palmer Domschke 43-yard field goal, 14:13. Broncos 27–17. Drive: 9 plays, 36 yards, 5:19.
- UNT – Cameron Dorner 4-yard pass from Drew Mestemaker (Kali Nguma kick), 10:03. Broncos 27–24. Drive: 9 plays, 65 yards, 4:10.
- UNT – Kali Nguma 25-yard field goal, 1:34. Tied 27–27. Drive: 9 plays, 68 yards, 1:40.

Overtime

- WMU – Palmer Domschke 48-yard field goal. Broncos 30–27. Drive: 4 plays, -5 yards.
- UNT – Makenzie McGill II 3-yard run. Mean Green 33–30. Drive: 3 plays, 25 yards.

| Statistics | UNT | WMU |
|---|---|---|
| First downs | 25 | 18 |
| Plays–yards | 71-406 | 63-303 |
| Rushes–yards | 30-182 | 57-216 |
| Passing yards | 224 | 87 |
| Passing: comp–att–int | 18-33-0 | 7-14-0 |
| Turnovers | 0 | 0 |
| Time of possession | 23:22 | 36:38 |

| Team | Category | Player | Statistics |
|---|---|---|---|
| North Texas | Passing | Drew Mestemaker | 18/33, 224 yards, 2 TD |
| North Texas | Rushing | Makenzie McGill II | 16 carries, 102 yards, TD |
| North Texas | Receiving | Wyatt Young | 4 receptions, 59 yards |
| Western Michigan | Passing | Broc Lowry | 5/10, 75 yards, TD |
| Western Michigan | Rushing | Jalen Buckley | 30 carries, 112 yards, TD |
| Western Michigan | Receiving | Jalen Buckley | 2 receptions, 51 yards |

=== at No. 9 Illinois ===
Western Michigan Broncos (0–2) at No. 9 Illinois Fighting Illini (2–0) – Game summary

| Quarter | 1 | 2 | 3 | 4 | Total |
|---|---|---|---|---|---|
| Broncos | 0 | 0 | 0 | 0 | 0 |
| No. 9 Fighting Illini | 3 | 7 | 14 | 14 | 38 |

at Gies Memorial Stadium • Champaign, IL

- Date: September 13
- Game time: 6:00 PM CDT
- Game weather: Cloudy, 90 F, Wind: South East 6 mph
- Game attendance: 60,670
- Referee: Mark Kluczynski
- TV announcers (FS1): Noah Reed (play-by-play) and Robert Smith (analyst)

Game information

First quarter

- (8:47) ILL – David Olano 28-yard field goal (Drive: 14 plays, 65 yards, 6:13; Illinois 3-0)

Second quarter

- (13:31) ILL – Hank Beatty 6-yard pass from Luke Altmyer, David Olano kick (Drive: 9 plays, 68 yards, 3:53; Illinois 10-0)

Third quarter

- (10:59) ILL – Kaden Feagin 3-yard run, David Olano kick (Drive: 5 plays, 53 yards, 2:01; Illinois 17-0)
- (2:48) ILL – Luke Altmyer 2-yard run, David Olano kick (Drive: 10 plays, 80 yards, 4:54; Illinois 24-0)

Fourth quarter

- (13:31) ILL – Ashton Hollins 6-yard pass from Luke Altmyer, David Olano kick (Drive: 5 plays, 53 yards, 2:08; Illinois 31-0)
- (5:15) ILL – Ca'Lil Valentine 2-yard run, David Olano kick (Drive: 7 plays, 42 yards, 4:24; Illinois 38-0)

| Statistics | WMU | ILL |
|---|---|---|
| First downs | 12 | 20 |
| Plays–yards | 58–204 | 63–358 |
| Rushes–yards | 34-113 | 37-162 |
| Passing yards | 91 | 196 |
| Passing: comp–att–int | 13-24-0 | 17-26-0 |
| Turnovers | 0 | 0 |
| Time of possession | 28:27 | 31:33 |

| Team | Category | Player | Statistics |
|---|---|---|---|
| Western Michigan | Passing | Broc Lowry | 10/16, 78 yards |
| Western Michigan | Rushing | Ofa Mataele | 8 carries, 46 yards |
| Western Michigan | Receiving | Baylin Brooks | 3 receptions, 24 yards |
| Illinois | Passing | Luke Altmyer | 17/26, 196 yards, 2 TD |
| Illinois | Rushing | Kaden Feagin | 20 carries, 100 yards, TD |
| Illinois | Receiving | Hank Beatty | 6 receptions, 53 yards, TD |

=== Toledo ===
Toledo Rockets (2–1, 0-0) at Western Michigan Broncos (0–3, 0-0) – Game summary

| Quarter | 1 | 2 | 3 | 4 | Total |
|---|---|---|---|---|---|
| Rockets | 0 | 3 | 10 | 0 | 13 |
| Broncos | 0 | 0 | 6 | 8 | 14 |

at Waldo Stadium • Kalamazoo, MI

- Date: September 20
- Game time: 3:30 p.m. EDT
- Game weather: Cloudy • Temperature: 80 °F (27 °C) • Wind: SE at 6 miles per hour (9.7 km/h)
- Game attendance: 20,744
- Referee: Marcel Kerr
- TV announcers (ESPN+): Ted Emrich (play-by-play) and Marcus Ray (analyst)

Game information

First quarter

- No scoring plays.

Second quarter

- (0:22) TOL – Dylan Cunanan 30-yard field goal (Drive: 4 plays, 1 yard, 0:38; Toledo 3-0)

Third quarter

- (14:28) TOL – Chip Trayanum 63-yard run, Dylan Cunanan kick (Drive: 2 plays, 75 yards, 0:32; Toledo 10-0)
- (7:43) TOL – Dylan Cunanan 27-yard field goal (Drive: 6 plays, 16 yards, 2:37; Toledo 13-0)
- (0:48) WMU – Broc Lowry 6-yard run, Palmer Domschke PAT failed (Drive: 7 plays, 90 yards, 3:47; Toledo 13-6)

Fourth quarter

- (0:52) WMU – Broc Lowry 2-yard run, Broc Lowry run for two-point conversion (Drive: 6 plays, 48 yards, 0:48; Western Michigan 14-13)

| Statistics | TOL | WMU |
|---|---|---|
| First downs | 16 | 17 |
| Plays–yards | 72–280 | 70–291 |
| Rushes–yards | 42–191 | 37–90 |
| Passing yards | 89 | 201 |
| Passing: Comp–Att–Int | 15–30–2 | 16–33–1 |
| Turnovers | 2 | 3 |
| Time of possession | 29:42 | 30:18 |

| Team | Category | Player | Statistics |
|---|---|---|---|
| Toledo | Passing | Tucker Gleason | 15/30, 89 yards, 2 INT |
| Toledo | Rushing | Chip Trayanum | 26 carries, 153 yards, TD |
| Toledo | Receiving | Terrell Crosby Jr. | 3 receptions, 34 yards |
| Western Michigan | Passing | Broc Lowry | 16/33, 201 yards, INT |
| Western Michigan | Rushing | Broc Lowry | 18 carries, 50 yards, 2 TD |
| Western Michigan | Receiving | Talique Williams | 4 receptions, 112 yards |

=== No. 6 (FCS) Rhode Island ===
No. 6 (FCS) Rhode Island Rams (4–0) at Western Michigan Broncos (1–3) – Game summary

| Quarter | 1 | 2 | 3 | 4 | Total |
|---|---|---|---|---|---|
| No. 6 (FCS) Rams | 7 | 0 | 0 | 7 | 14 |
| Broncos | 3 | 28 | 13 | 3 | 47 |

at Waldo Stadium • Kalamazoo, MI

- Date: September 27
- Game time: 6:30 PM EDT
- Game weather: • Temperature: 78 °F (26 °C) • Wind: W at 8 miles per hour (13 km/h)
- Game attendance: 20,191
- Referee: Andrew Speciale
- TV announcers (ESPN+): Jack Kizer (play-by-play) and Forrest Conoly (analyst)

Game information

First quarter

- (13:49) URI – Antwain Littleton Jr. 2-yard run, Garth White kick (Drive: 3 plays, 75 yards, 1:11; Rhode Island 7-0)
- (6:48) WMU – Palmer Domschke 29-yard field goal (Drive: 15 plays, 68 yards, 6:58; Rhode Island 7-3)

Second quarter

- (13:35) WMU – Broc Lowry 4-yard run, Palmer Domschke kick (Drive: 13 plays, 72 yards, 7:15; Western Michigan 10-7)
- (7:59) WMU – Aveion Chenault 10-yard pass from Broc Lowry, Palmer Domschke kick (Drive: 7 plays, 55 yards, 4:02; Western Michigan 17-7)
- (4:54) WMU – Ofa Mataele 22-yard run, Palmer Domschke kick (Drive: 3 plays, 29 yards, 1:21; Western Michigan 24-7)
- (0:20) WMU – Devin Miles 1-yard run, Palmer Domschke kick (Drive: 8 plays, 55 yards, 2:21; Western Michigan 31-7)

Third quarter

- (13:35) WMU – Ofa Mataele 3-yard run, Palmer Domschke kick (Drive: 1 play, 3 yards, 0:00; Western Michigan 38-7)
- (6:12) WMU – Palmer Domschke 41-yard field goal (Drive: 9 plays, 47 yards, 5:11; Western Michigan 41-7)
- (2:54) WMU – Palmer Domschke 49-yard field goal (Drive: 4 plays, 7 yards, 2:03; Western Michigan 44-7)

Fourth quarter

- (14:54) URI – Antwain Littleton Jr. 5-yard pass from Devin Farrell, Garth White kick (Drive: 7 plays, 75 yards, 3:00; Western Michigan 44-14)
- (2:36) WMU – Hunter Smith 21-yard field goal (Drive: 5 plays, 14 yards, 1:47; Western Michigan 47-14)

| Statistics | URI | WMU |
|---|---|---|
| First downs | 16 | 25 |
| Plays–yards | 51–251 | 77–372 |
| Rushes–yards | 23–(-5) | 53–216 |
| Passing yards | 256 | 156 |
| Passing: Comp–Att–Int | 19–28–1 | 17–24–1 |
| Turnovers | 4 | 2 |
| Time of possession | 20:35 | 39:25 |

| Team | Category | Player | Statistics |
|---|---|---|---|
| Rhode Island | Passing | Devin Farrell | 16/24, 229 yards, TD, INT |
| Rhode Island | Rushing | Antwain Littleton Jr. | 12 carries, 35 yards, TD |
| Rhode Island | Receiving | Marquis Buchanan | 7 receptions, 141 yards |
| Western Michigan | Passing | Broc Lowry | 15/20, 143 yards, TD |
| Western Michigan | Rushing | Ofa Mataele | 10 carries, 60 yards, 2 TD |
| Western Michigan | Receiving | Baylin Brooks | 2 receptions, 32 yards |

=== at UMass ===
Western Michigan Broncos (2–3, 1-0) at UMass Minutemen (0–4, 0-0) – Game summary

| Quarter | 1 | 2 | 3 | 4 | Total |
|---|---|---|---|---|---|
| Broncos | 0 | 7 | 7 | 7 | 21 |
| Minutemen | 3 | 0 | 0 | 0 | 3 |

at Warren McGuirk Alumni Stadium • Amherst, MA

- Date: October 4
- Game time: 2:30 p.m. EDT
- Game weather: Sunny • Temperature: 77 °F (25 °C) • Wind: SW at 2 miles per hour (3.2 km/h)
- Game attendance: 10,014
- Referee: Matt Packowski
- TV announcers (ESPN+): Cooper Boardman (play-by-play) and Craig Haubert (analyst)

Game information

First quarter

- (9:42) MASS – Derek Morris 36-yard field goal (Drive: 11 plays, 57 yards, 5:18; UMass 3-0)

Second quarter

- (9:23) WMU – Michael Brescia 8-yard pass from Broc Lowry, Palmer Domschke kick (Drive: 5 plays, 72 yards, 2:38; Western Michigan 7-3)

Third quarter

- (1:26) WMU – Broc Lowry 4-yard run, Palmer Domschke kick (Drive: 10 plays, 50 yards, 4:24; Western Michigan 14-3)

Fourth quarter

- (8:04) WMU – Devin Miles 25-yard run, Palmer Domschke kick (Drive: 11 plays, 87 yards, 5:58; Western Michigan 21-3)

| Statistics | WMU | MASS |
|---|---|---|
| First downs | 23 | 14 |
| Plays–yards | 67–380 | 64–260 |
| Rushes–yards | 42–217 | 29–57 |
| Passing yards | 163 | 203 |
| Passing: Comp–Att–Int | 18–25–0 | 20–35–1 |
| Turnovers | 2 | 1 |
| Time of possession | 32:26 | 27:34 |

| Team | Category | Player | Statistics |
|---|---|---|---|
| Western Michigan | Passing | Broc Lowry | 18/25, 163 yards, TD |
| Western Michigan | Rushing | Broc Lowry | 15 carries, 92 yards, TD |
| Western Michigan | Receiving | Aveion Chenault | 2 receptions, 51 yards |
| UMass | Passing | AJ Hairston | 11/18, 131 yards, INT |
| UMass | Rushing | Juwaun Price | 6 carries, 54 yards |
| UMass | Receiving | Jacquon Gibson | 6 receptions, 70 yards |

=== Ball State ===
Ball State Cardinals (2–3, 1-0) at Western Michigan Broncos (3–3, 2-0) – Game summary

| Quarter | 1 | 2 | 3 | 4 | Total |
|---|---|---|---|---|---|
| Cardinals | 0 | 0 | 0 | 0 | 0 |
| Broncos | 7 | 14 | 7 | 14 | 42 |

at Waldo Stadium • Kalamazoo, MI

- Date: October 11
- Game time: 3:30 p.m. EDT
- Game weather: Cloudy • Temperature: 64 °F (18 °C) • Wind: NE at 5 miles per hour (8.0 km/h)
- Game attendance: 20,032
- Referee: Billy Williams
- TV announcers (ESPN+): Shawn Kenney (play-by-play) and Marcus Ray (analyst)

Game information

First quarter

- (1:56) WMU – Ofa Mataele 1-yard run, Palmer Domschke kick (Drive: 3 plays, 55 yards, 1:22; Western Michigan 7-0)

Second quarter

- (13:47) WMU – Michael Brescia 5-yard pass from Broc Lowry, Palmer Domschke kick (Drive: 4 plays, 27 yards, 1:28; Western Michigan 14-0)
- (8:16) WMU – Jalen Buckley 2-yard run, Palmer Domschke kick (Drive: 6 plays, 73 yards, 2:39; Western Michigan 21-0)

Third quarter

- (7:59) WMU – Aveion Chenault 14-yard pass from Broc Lowry, Palmer Domschke kick (Drive: 8 plays, 73 yards, 3:25; Western Michigan 28-0)

Fourth quarter

- (8:26) WMU – Broc Lowry 37-yard run, Palmer Domschke kick (Drive: 8 plays, 73 yards, 3:25; Western Michigan 35-0)
- (3:42) WMU – Cade Conley 1-yard pass from Brady Jones, Palmer Domschke kick (Drive: 8 plays, 27 yards, 4:09; Western Michigan 42-0)

| Statistics | BALL | WMU |
|---|---|---|
| First downs | 5 | 25 |
| Plays–yards | 50–88 | 73–461 |
| Rushes–yards | 27–20 | 44–219 |
| Passing yards | 68 | 242 |
| Passing: Comp–Att–Int | 13–23–0 | 24–29–1 |
| Turnovers | 2 | 2 |
| Time of possession | 24:23 | 35:37 |

| Team | Category | Player | Statistics |
|---|---|---|---|
| Ball State | Passing | Kiael Kelly | 13/22, 68 yards |
| Ball State | Rushing | Qua Ashley | 6 carries, 17 yards |
| Ball State | Receiving | Qian Magwood | 3 receptions, 26 yards |
| Western Michigan | Passing | Broc Lowry | 23/27, 241 yards, 2 TD |
| Western Michigan | Rushing | Broc Lowry | 13 carries, 108 yards, TD |
| Western Michigan | Receiving | Talique Williams | 5 receptions, 55 yards |

=== at Miami (OH) ===
Western Michigan Broncos (4–3, 3-0) at Miami RedHawks (4–3, 3-0) – Game summary

| Quarter | 1 | 2 | 3 | 4 | Total |
|---|---|---|---|---|---|
| Broncos | 0 | 14 | 3 | 0 | 17 |
| RedHawks | 3 | 6 | 0 | 17 | 26 |

at Yager Stadium • Oxford, OH

- Date: October 25
- Game time: 3:30 p.m. EDT
- Game weather: Cloudy • Temperature: 56 °F (13 °C) • Wind: E at 4 miles per hour (6.4 km/h)
- Game attendance: 18,025
- Referee: Marcel Kerr
- TV announcers (ESPN+): Michael Reghi (play-by-play) and Marcus Ray (analyst)

Game information

First quarter

- (11:28) M–OH – Dom Dzioban 44-yard field goal (Drive: 7 plays, 48 yards, 3:32; Miami (OH) 3–0)

Second quarter

- (14:54) M–OH – Dom Dzioban 24-yard field goal (Drive: 13 plays, 68 yards, 6:54; Miami (OH) 6–0)
- (5:17) WMU – Tailique Williams 43-yard pass from Broc Lowry, Palmer Domschke kick (Drive: 4 plays, 93 yards, 1:21; Western Michigan 7–6)
- (2:36) M–OH – Dom Dzioban 29-yard field goal (Drive: 7 plays, 63 yards, 2:41; Miami (OH) 9–7)
- (0:49) WMU – Michael Brescia 2-yard run, Palmer Domschke kick (Drive: 7 plays, 21 yards, 1:32; Western Michigan 14–9)

Third quarter

- (4:10) WMU – Palmer Domschke 42-yard field goal (Drive: 15 plays, 58 yards, 7:39; Western Michigan 17–9)

Fourth quarter

- (10:31) M–OH – Brian Shane 3-yard pass from Dequan Finn (Drive: 9 plays, 71 yards, 4:29; Western Michigan 17–15)
- (4:40) M–OH – Dequan Finn 18-yard run, Kam Perry pass (Drive: 6 plays, 88 yards, 2:27; Western Michigan 23–17)
- (1:56) M–OH – Dom Dzioban 51-yard field goal (Drive: 4 plays, 5 yards, 0:58; Miami (OH) 26–17)

| Statistics | WMU | M-OH |
|---|---|---|
| First downs | 17 | 19 |
| Plays–yards | 68–316 | 62–408 |
| Rushes–yards | 39–144 | 32–148 |
| Passing yards | 172 | 260 |
| Passing: Comp–Att–Int | 16–29–0 | 18–30–0 |
| Turnovers | 1 | 0 |
| Time of possession | 29:21 | 30:39 |

| Team | Category | Player | Statistics |
|---|---|---|---|
| Western Michigan | Passing | Broc Lowry | 16/28, 172 yards, TD |
| Western Michigan | Rushing | Broc Lowry | 20 carries, 82 yards |
| Western Michigan | Receiving | Tailique Williams | 5 receptions, 71 yards, TD |
| Miami (OH) | Passing | Dequan Finn | 18/30, 260 yards, TD |
| Miami (OH) | Rushing | Jordan Brunson | 13 carries, 90 yards |
| Miami (OH) | Receiving | Kam Perry | 4 receptions, 98 yards |

=== Central Michigan (rivalry) ===
Central Michigan Chippewas (5–3, 3-1) at Western Michigan Broncos (4–4, 3-1) – Game summary

| Quarter | 1 | 2 | 3 | 4 | Total |
|---|---|---|---|---|---|
| Chippewas | 7 | 7 | 0 | 7 | 21 |
| Broncos | 0 | 7 | 7 | 10 | 24 |

at Waldo Stadium • Kalamazoo, MI

- Date: November 1
- Game time: 4:00 p.m. EDT
- Game weather: Cloudy • Temperature: 48 °F (9 °C) • Wind: SW at 7 miles per hour (11 km/h)
- Game attendance: 29,299
- Referee: Rich Edwards
- TV announcers (ESPNU): Jason Ross Jr. (play-by-play) and Je'Rod Cherry (analyst)

Game information

First quarter

- (2:31) CMU – Nahree Biggins 1-yard run, Cade Graham kick (Drive: 13 plays, 73 yards, 8:55; Central Michigan 7-0)

Second quarter

- (7:43) WMU – Broc Lowry 1-yard run, Palmer Domschke kick (Drive: 9 plays, 41 yards, 5:08; 7-7)
- (7:23) CMU – Langston Lewis 77-yard pass from Joe Labas, Cade Graham kick (Drive: 1 play, 77 yards, 0:10; Central Michigan 14-7)

Third quarter

- (8:43) WMU – Jalen Buckley 9-yard run, Palmer Domschke kick (Drive: 11 plays, 65 yards, 5:20; 14-14)

Fourth quarter

- (14:53) CMU – Tyson Davis 33-yard pass from Marcus Beamon, Cade Graham kick (Drive: 16 plays, 75 yards, 8:50; Central Michigan 21-14)
- (9:01) WMU – Palmer Domschke 46-yard field goal (Drive: 10 plays, 48 yards, 5:52; Central Michigan 21-17)
- (2:08) WMU – Talique Williams 7-yard pass from Broc Lowry, Palmer Domschke kick (Drive: 11 plays, 70 yards, 4:52; Western Michigan 24-21)

| Statistics | CMU | WMU |
|---|---|---|
| First downs | 13 | 23 |
| Plays–yards | 47–240 | 68–327 |
| Rushes–yards | 35–55 | 44–177 |
| Passing yards | 185 | 150 |
| Passing: Comp–Att–Int | 9-12-1 | 17-24-0 |
| Turnovers | 2 | 1 |
| Time of possession | 26:18 | 33:42 |

| Team | Category | Player | Statistics |
|---|---|---|---|
| Central Michigan | Passing | Joe Labas | 8/11, 152 yards, TD, INT |
| Central Michigan | Rushing | Brock Townsend | 9 carries, 26 yards |
| Central Michigan | Receiving | Langston Lewis | 4 receptions, 111 yards, TD |
| Western Michigan | Passing | Broc Lowry | 17/24, 150 yards, TD |
| Western Michigan | Rushing | Broc Lowry | 22 carries, 82 yards, TD |
| Western Michigan | Receiving | Talique Williams | 7 receptions, 48 yards, TD |

=== Ohio ===
Ohio Bobcats (6–3, 4-1) at Western Michigan Broncos (5–4, 4-1) – Game summary

| Quarter | 1 | 2 | 3 | 4 | Total |
|---|---|---|---|---|---|
| Bobcats | 7 | 0 | 0 | 6 | 13 |
| Broncos | 3 | 0 | 7 | 7 | 17 |

at Waldo Stadium • Kalamazoo, MI

- Date: November 11
- Game time: 7:30 PM EST
- Game weather: clear Temperature:33 °F (1 °C), Wind: SW 10 mph
- Game attendance: 10,849
- Referee: Matt Packowski (MAC)
- TV announcers (ESPN2): Clay Matvick (play-by-play) and Chase Daniel (analyst)

Game information

First quarter

- (10:19) WMU – Palmer Domschke 46-yard field goal, 4 plays, 5 yards, 2:07; WMU 3–0
- (01:07) OHIO – Parker Navarro 2-yard run (David Dellenbach kick), 9 plays, 64 yards, 5:02; OHIO 7–3

Second quarter

- No scoring plays.

Third quarter

- (10:09) WMU – Broc Lowry 1-yard run (Palmer Domschke kick), 8 plays, 68 yards, 4:45; WMU 10–7

Fourth quarter

- (14:55) OHIO – Sieh Bangure 3-yard run (kick failed), 17 plays, 83 yards, 10:08; OHIO 13–10
- (13:43) WMU – Jalen Buckley 3-yard run (Palmer Domschke kick), 3 plays, 75 yards, 1:12; WMU 17–13

| Statistics | OHIO | WMU |
|---|---|---|
| First downs | 15 | 16 |
| Plays–yards | 58–287 | 56–336 |
| Rushes–yards | 39–217 | 42–210 |
| Passing yards | 70 | 126 |
| Passing: Comp–Att–Int | 8–19–1 | 9–14–0 |
| Turnovers | 1 | 0 |
| Time of possession | 28:46 | 31:14 |

| Team | Category | Player | Statistics |
|---|---|---|---|
| Ohio | Passing | Parker Navarro | 8/19, 70 yards, INT |
| Ohio | Rushing | Parker Navarro | 18 carries, 105 yards, TD |
| Ohio | Receiving | Mason Williams | 2 receptions, 20 yards |
| Western Michigan | Passing | Broc Lowry | 9/14, 126 yards |
| Western Michigan | Rushing | Broc Lowry | 18 carries, 92 yards, TD |
| Western Michigan | Receiving | Talique Williams | 1 receptions, 71 yards |

=== at Northern Illinois ===
Western Michigan Broncos (6–4, 5-1) at Northern Illinois Huskies (3–7, 2-4) – Game summary

| Quarter | 1 | 2 | 3 | 4 | Total |
|---|---|---|---|---|---|
| Broncos | 0 | 14 | 7 | 14 | 35 |
| Huskies | 10 | 3 | 0 | 6 | 19 |

at Huskie Stadium • DeKalb, IL

- Date: November 18
- Game time: 6:00 PM CST
- Game weather: Cloudy • Temperature: 43 °F (6 °C) • Wind: SW at 12 miles per hour (19 km/h)
- Game attendance: 4,734
- Referee: Andrew Speciale
- TV announcers (ESPN2): Courtney Lyle (play-by-play) and Rene Ingoglia (analyst)

Game information

First quarter

- (11:21) NIU – Telly Johnson Jr. 43-yard run, Andrew Glass kick (Drive: 8 plays, 75 yards, 3:39; Northern Illinois 7–0)
- (9:13) NIU – Andrew Glass 39-yard field goal (Drive: 4 plays, -2 yards, 1:54; Northern Illinois 10–0)

Second quarter

- (11:45) NIU – Andrew Glass 41-yard field goal (Drive: 10 plays, 52 yards, 3:43; Northern Illinois 13–0)
- (6:13) WMU – Broc Lowry 18-yard run, Palmer Domschke kick (Drive: 2 plays, 50 yards, 0:41; Northern Illinois 13–7)
- (0:40) WMU – Jalen Buckley 8-yard run, Palmer Domschke kick (Drive: 7 plays, 39 yards, 1:46; Western Michigan 14–13)

Third quarter

- (8:11) WMU – Broc Lowry 8-yard run, Palmer Domschke kick (Drive: 12 plays, 89 yards, 6:44; Western Michigan 21–13)

Fourth quarter

- (9:46) WMU – Jalen Buckley 1-yard run, Palmer Domschke kick (Drive: 15 plays, 76 yards, 7:33; Western Michigan 28–13)
- (7:19) WMU – Broc Lowry 1-yard run, Palmer Domschke kick (Drive: 2 plays, 5 yards, 0:39; Western Michigan 35–13)
- (4:25) NIU – Rickey Taylor Jr. 18-yard pass from Brady Davidson, two-point pass conversion failed) (Drive: 10 plays, 75 yards, 2:54; Western Michigan 35–19)

| Statistics | WMU | NIU |
|---|---|---|
| First downs | 25 | 13 |
| Plays–yards | 68–393 | 58–252 |
| Rushes–yards | 59–361 | 43–174 |
| Passing yards | 32 | 78 |
| Passing: Comp–Att–Int | 5–9–1 | 6–15–0 |
| Turnovers | 1 | 0 |
| Time of possession | 33:49 | 26:11 |

| Team | Category | Player | Statistics |
|---|---|---|---|
| Western Michigan | Passing | Broc Lowry | 5/9, 32 yards, INT |
| Western Michigan | Rushing | Jalen Buckley | 24 carries, 133 yards, 2 TD |
| Western Michigan | Receiving | Christian Leary | 2 receptions, 17 yards |
| Northern Illinois | Passing | Brady Davidson | 5/8, 73 yards, TD |
| Northern Illinois | Rushing | Chavon Wright | 21 carries, 92 yards |
| Northern Illinois | Receiving | Rickey Taylor Jr. | 3 receptions, 53 yards, TD |

=== at Eastern Michigan (Michigan MAC Trophy) ===
Western Michigan Broncos (7–4. 6-1) at Eastern Michigan Eagles (4–7, 3-4) – Game summary

| Quarter | 1 | 2 | 3 | 4 | Total |
|---|---|---|---|---|---|
| Broncos | 0 | 17 | 14 | 0 | 31 |
| Eagles | 7 | 0 | 0 | 14 | 21 |

at Rynearson Stadium • Ypsilanti, MI

- Date: November 25
- Game time: 7:30 p.m. EST
- Game weather: Overcast • Temperature: 50 °F (10 °C) • Wind: SW at 7 miles per hour (11 km/h)
- Game attendance: 11,818
- Referee: Rich Edwards
- TV announcers (ESPN2): Courtney Lyle (play-by-play) and Rene Ingoglia (analyst)

Game information

Note

- Broncos win Michigan MAC Football Trophy Outright: WMU- 2-0, CMU- 1-1, EMU- 0-2

First quarter

- (6:35) EMU – Dontae McMillan 21-yard pass from Noah Kim, Rudy Kessinger kick (Drive: 9 plays, 98 yards, 4:50; Eastern Michigan 7–0)

Second quarter

- (7:30) WMU – Talique Williams 36-yard run, Palmer Domschke kick (Drive: 12 plays, 95 yards, 7:35; Tied 7–7)
- (1:31) WMU – Broc Lowry 33-yard run, Palmer Domschke kick (Drive: 5 plays, 75 yards, 2:06; Western Michigan 14–7)
- (0:02) WMU – Palmer Domschke 44-yard field goal (Drive: 9 plays, 52 yards, 1:08; Western Michigan 17–7)

Third quarter

- (7:31) WMU – Broc Lowry 1-yard run, Palmer Domschke kick (Drive: 5 plays, 23 yards, 2:52; Western Michigan 24–7)
- (2:31) WMU – Jalen Buckley 4-yard run, Palmer Domschke kick (Drive: 8 plays, 49 yards, 3:26; Western Michigan 31–7)

Fourth quarter

- (12:14) EMU – Nick Devereaux 1-yard pass from Noah Kim, two-point pass conversion failed (Drive: 11 plays, 92 yards, 5:10; Western Michigan 31–13)
- (2:28) EMU – Dontae McMillan 21-yard run, Noah Kim Pass to Joshua Long for two-point conversion (Drive: 9 plays, 98 yards, 4:50; Western Michigan 31–21)

| Statistics | WMU | EMU |
|---|---|---|
| First downs | 13 | 21 |
| Plays–yards | 64–378 | 64–461 |
| Rushes–yards | 49–278 | 23–134 |
| Passing yards | 100 | 327 |
| Passing: Comp–Att–Int | 7–15–0 | 24–41–3 |
| Turnovers | 0 | 5 |
| Time of possession | 32:21 | 27:39 |

| Team | Category | Player | Statistics |
|---|---|---|---|
| Western Michigan | Passing | Broc Lowry | 7/14, 100 yards |
| Western Michigan | Rushing | Broc Lowry | 18 carries, 92 yards, 2 TD |
| Western Michigan | Receiving | Blake Bosma | 3 receptions, 38 yards |
| Eastern Michigan | Passing | Noah Kim | 24/41, 327 yards, 2 TD, 3 INT |
| Eastern Michigan | Rushing | Dontae McMillan | 11 carries, 111 yards, TD |
| Eastern Michigan | Receiving | Dontae McMillan | 4 receptions, 126 yards, TD |

=== vs Miami (OH) (MAC Football Championship Game) ===
2025 MAC Championship
Miami RedHawks (7–5, 6-2) vs. Western Michigan Broncos (8–4, 7-1) – Game summary

| Quarter | 1 | 2 | 3 | 4 | Total |
|---|---|---|---|---|---|
| RedHawks | 6 | 0 | 0 | 7 | 13 |
| Broncos | 10 | 6 | 7 | 0 | 23 |

at Ford Field • Detroit, MI

- Date: December 6
- Game time: 12:00 p.m. EST
- Game attendance: 19,114
- Referee: Rick Warne
- TV announcers (ESPN): Roy Philpott (play-by-play), Sam Acho (analyst) and Taylor Davis (sideline)

Game information

Notes

- This was the 8th appearance in the MAC Football Championship Game for Miami (OH) (4-4)
- This was the 4th appearance in the MAC Football Championship Game for Western Michigan (2-2)
- Western Michigan has now won 4 MAC titles (1966, 1988, 2016, 2025)
- Miami (OH) won a three-way tiebreaker with Ohio and Toledo to advance to the Championship Game

First quarter

- (13:33) WMU – Jalen Buckley 67-yard run, Palmer Domschke kick (Drive: 3 plays, 75 yards, 1:27; Western Michigan 7–0)
- (11:40) M–OH – Jordan Brunson 1-yard run, Dom Dzioban PAT failed (Drive: 5 plays, 75 yards, 1:53; Western Michigan 7–6)
- (6:51) WMU – Palmer Domschke 27-yard Field Goal (Drive: 10 plays, 66 yards, 4:49; Western Michigan 10–6)

Second quarter

- (13:43) WMU – Palmer Domschke 31-yard Field Goal (Drive: 12 plays, 78 yards, 7:02; Western Michigan 13–6)
- (0:50) WMU – Palmer Domschke 50-yard field goal (Drive: 7 plays, 33 yards, 0:57; Western Michigan 16–6)

Third quarter

- (13:16) WMU – Jalen Buckley 64-yard run, Palmer Domschke kick (Drive: 2 plays, 65 yards, 0:43; Western Michigan 23–6)

Fourth quarter

- (6:43) M–OH – Cole Weaver 6-yard pass from Henry Hesson, Dom Dzioban kick (Drive: 8 plays, 80 yards, 2:42; Western Michigan 23–13)

Most Valuable Players

- Offensive: RB Jalen Buckley (WMU)
- Defensive: DE Nadame Tucker (WMU)
- Special Teams: K Palmer Domschke (WMU)

| Statistics | M-OH | WMU |
|---|---|---|
| First downs | 18 | 18 |
| Plays–yards | 69–272 | 69–397 |
| Rushes–yards | 31–73 | 56–286 |
| Passing yards | 199 | 111 |
| Passing: Comp–Att–Int | 14–38–0 | 8–13–0 |
| Turnovers | 1 | 0 |
| Time of possession | 24:43 | 35:17 |

| Team | Category | Player | Statistics |
|---|---|---|---|
| Miami (OH) | Passing | Henry Hesson | 17/20, 120 yards, TD |
| Miami (OH) | Rushing | Jordan Brunson | 14 carries, 59 yards, TD |
| Miami (OH) | Receiving | Kam Perry | 7 receptions, 101 yards |
| Western Michigan | Passing | Broc Lowry | 8/13, 111 yards |
| Western Michigan | Rushing | Jalen Buckley | 19 carries, 193 yards, 2 TD |
| Western Michigan | Receiving | Michael Brescia | 2 receptions, 47 yards |

=== vs Kennesaw State (Myrtle Beach Bowl) ===
2025 Myrtle Beach Bowl
Kennesaw State Owls (10–3) vs. Western Michigan Broncos (9–4) – Game summary

| Quarter | 1 | 2 | 3 | 4 | Total |
|---|---|---|---|---|---|
| Owls | 0 | 0 | 6 | 0 | 6 |
| Broncos | 27 | 7 | 7 | 0 | 41 |

at Brooks Stadium • Conway, SC

- Date: December 19
- Game time: 11:00 a.m. EST
- Game weather: Sunny • Temperature: 61 °F (16 °C) • Wind: W at 15 miles per hour (24 km/h)
- Game attendance: 9,139
- Referee: Jeremy Parker
- TV announcers (ESPN): Matt Schumacker (play-by-play), Dustin Fox (analyst) and Marilyn Payne (sideline)

Game information

First quarter

- (14:42) WMU – Jalen Buckley 65 yard run, Palmer Domschke kick (Drive: 1 play, 65 yards, 0:10; Western Michigan 7–0)
- (13:44) WMU – Kershawn Fisher 47 yard fumble recovery, Palmer Domschke kick (Drive: 4 plays, 13 yards, 0:52; Western Michigan 14–0)
- (7:39) WMU – Mareyohn Hrabowski 4 yard pass from Broc Lowry, Palmer Domschke kick (Drive: 8 plays, 60 yards, 4:49; Western Michigan 21–0)
- (2:38) WMU – Blake Bosma 3 yard pass from Broc Lowry, Palmer Domschke PAT failed (Drive: 6 plays, 76 yards, 3:14; Western Michigan 27–0)

Second quarter

- (7:45) WMU – Devin Miles 2 yard run, Palmer Domschke kick (Drive: 3 plays, 14 yards, 1:49; Western Michigan 34–0)

Third quarter

- (13:26) WMU – Joey Pope 75 yard interception return, Palmer Domschke kick (Drive: 6 plays, 27 yards, 1:34; Western Michigan 41–0)
- (4:10) KSU – Javon Rogers 82 yard pass from Amari Odom, Britton Williams PAT failed (Drive: 4 plays, 94 yards, 2:17; Western Michigan 41–6)

Fourth Quarter

- No scoring plays.

| Statistics | KENN | WMU |
|---|---|---|
| First downs | 18 | 18 |
| Plays–yards | 70–378 | 62–423 |
| Rushes–yards | 34–169 | 43–303 |
| Passing yards | 209 | 120 |
| Passing: Comp–Att–Int | 18–36–2 | 12–19–1 |
| Turnovers | 4 | 2 |
| Time of possession | 25:44 | 34:16 |

| Team | Category | Player | Statistics |
|---|---|---|---|
| Kennesaw State | Passing | Amari Odom | 18/35, 209 yards, TD, 2 INT |
| Kennesaw State | Rushing | Chase Belcher | 16 carries, 148 yards |
| Kennesaw State | Receiving | Javon Rogers | 3 receptions, 111 yards, TD |
| Western Michigan | Passing | Broc Lowry | 12/19, 120 yards, 2 TD, INT |
| Western Michigan | Rushing | Jalen Buckley | 8 carries, 174 yards, TD |
| Western Michigan | Receiving | Blake Bosma | 5 receptions, 44 yards, TD |
