= 2025 Washington State Cougars football team =

American college football season

2025 Washington State Cougars football

Famous Idaho Potato Bowl champion

Famous Idaho Potato Bowl, W, 34–21 vs Utah State
- Conference: Pac-12 Conference
- Record: 7–6 (1–0 Pac-12)
- Head coach: Jimmy Rogers (1st season; regular season); Jesse Bobbit (interim; bowl game)
- Offensive coordinator: Danny Freund (1st season)
- Offensive scheme: Power spread
- Defensive coordinator: Jesse Bobbit (1st season)
- Base defense: 4–3
- Home stadium: Martin Stadium

2025 Pac-12 Conference football standings
| | Conf. | | | Overall |
| Team | W | | L | W | | L |
|---|---|---|---|---|---|---|
| Washington State | 1 | – | 0 | 7 | – | 6 |
| Oregon State | 0 | – | 1 | 2 | – | 10 |
Rankings from CFP Rankings

The 2025 Washington State Cougars football team represented Washington State University in the Pac-12 Conference during the 2025 NCAA Division I FBS football season. Led by first-year head coach Jimmy Rogers, the Cougars played home games on campus at Martin Stadium in Pullman, Washington.

Before the season started, 60 of the previous year's players chose to leave the team via the NCAA transfer portal, and were primarily replaced with players from the FCS and Division II in the NCAA football system. Washington State's loss at North Texas in Week 3 was their worst loss (by margin of defeat) since 2008, when they were shut out 58–0 at Stanford. Washington State closed out the regular season with a 32–8 victory over Oregon State in its only official conference game of the season.

Rogers was previously the head coach at South Dakota State for two seasons; the Jackrabbits were FCS champions in 2023, winning all fifteen of their games. Washington State went 6–6 in his only season in Pullman; following the regular season, Rogers accepted the head coaching job at Iowa State.

Washington State drew an average home attendance of 26,527 in 2025.

== Offseason ==
=== Transfers ===
==== Outgoing ====
| Player | Position | Destination |
|---|---|---|
| Landon Roaten | OL | Abilene Christian |
| Luke Roaten | OL | Abilene Christian |
| Brandon Hills | WR | Akron |
| Dajon Doss | LB | Arkansas–Monticello |
| Kris Hutson | WR | Arizona |
| Rashad McKenzie Jr. | DL | Arizona State |
| Adrian Wilson | S | Arizona State |
| Isaiah Cobbs | WR | Austin Peay |
| Ben Dutton | TE | Ball State |
| Camden DeGraw-Tryall | DE | Boise State |
| Hunter Najm | QB | Bowling Green |
| Ethan Torres | S | Cal Poly |
| King Williams | DB | Central Washington |
| Brady McKelheer | QB | Chapman |
| Zack Miller | OL | Chapman |
| Tai Faavae | LB | CSU Pueblo |
| Mahki Whitney | TE | Dodge City |
| Sean Embree Jr. | WR | Eastern Washington |
| Kyson Thomas | WR | Eastern Washington |
| Carson Osmus | OL | Florida Atlantic |
| Khalil Laufau | DL | Houston |
| Reilly Garcia | QB | Houston Christian |
| Nathan Pritchard | OL | Idaho |
| Reece Sylvester | S | Incarnate Word |
| David Gusta | DL | Kentucky |
| Aiden Knapke | DB | Lindenwood |
| Ethan O'Connor | DB | Miami |
| Dycurian Douglas | WR | Midwestern State |
| Stephen Hall | DB | Missouri |
| Josh Joyner | RB | Missouri State |
| Hyrum-Benjamin Moors | DL | New Mexico Highlands |
| John Mateer | QB | Oklahoma |
| Kapena Gushiken | DB | Ole Miss |
| Evans Chuba | QB | Purdue |
| Jackson Lataimua | S | Sacramento State |
| Warren Smith | DB | Sacramento State |
| Hunter Haines | DB | San Diego State |
| Jackson Cowgill | DL | South Dakota |
| Ashton Paine | DB | South Dakota |
| Ansel Din-Mbuh | DL | TCU |
| Tre Shackelford | WR | Tulane |
| Dylan Mauro | P | UC Davis |
| Djouvensky Schlenbaker | RB | UT Rio Grande Valley |
| Wayshawn Parker | RB | Utah |
| Durham Harris | LS | Vanderbilt |
| Nick Haberer | P | Vanderbilt |
| Carlos Hernandez | WR | Wake Forest |
| Jaylon Edmond | DB | Wake Forest |
| Chris Barnes | WR | Wake Forest |
| AJ Hasson | OL | Wake Forest |
| Fa'alili Fa'amoe | OL | Wake Forest |
| Devin Kylany | OL | Wake Forest |
| Frank Cusano | LB | Wake Forest |
| Rodrick Tialavea | OL | Wake Forest |
| Connor Calvert | K | Wake Forest |
| Taariq Al-Uqdah | LB | Washington |
| Aslan Fraser | S | Unknown |
| Tristan Bohannon | LB | Unknown |
| Gavin Fugate | LB | Unknown |
| Jerrae Williams | DB | Withdrawn |
| Leon Neal Jr. | WR | Withdrawn |
| Kamani Jackson | DB | Withdrawn |
| Zevi Eckhaus | QB | Withdrawn |
| Gage Jones | S | Withdrawn |
| Bryson Lamb | DE | Withdrawn |
| Michael Hughes | DE | Withdrawn |
| Josh Meredith | WR | Withdrawn |
| Trey Leckner | TE | Withdrawn |
| Hudson Cedarland | LB | Withdrawn |
| Colson Brunner | LS | Withdrawn |

==== Incoming ====
| Player | Position | Previous school |
|---|---|---|
| Soni Finau | DL | Cal Poly |
| Kai Rapolla | DB | Cal Poly |
| Jaylin Caldwell | OL | Grand Valley State |
| Sone Falealo | OL | Idaho |
| Kaden Beatty | DL | Kent State |
| Ademola Faleye | TE | Michigan State |
| Fallauga Peleti | LB | New Mexico State |
| Malaki Ta'ase | DL | New Mexico State |
| AJ Vaipulu | OL | New Mexico State |
| Jeremiah Noga | WR | Oregon State |
| Julian Dugger | QB | Pittsburgh |
| Ajani Sheppard | QB | Rutgers |
| Darrion Dalton | DL | San Diego State |
| AJ Davis | DB | SMU |
| Mike Yoan Sandjo-Njiki | DL | SMU |
| Max Baloun | DL | South Dakota State |
| Tucker Large | S | South Dakota State |
| Matthew Durrance | S | South Dakota State |
| Angel Johnson | RB | South Dakota State |
| Kirby Vorhees | RB | South Dakota State |
| Cale Reeder | DB | South Dakota State |
| Caleb Francl | LB | South Dakota State |
| Jack Stevens | K | South Dakota State |
| Fernando Lecuona | DE | South Dakota State |
| Carsten Reynolds | LB | South Dakota State |
| Colby Humphrey | DB | South Dakota State |
| Trey Ridley | S | South Dakota State |
| Maxwell Woods | RB | South Dakota State |
| Nick Bakken | OL | South Dakota State |
| Anthony Palano | LB | South Dakota State |
| Beau Baker | TE | South Dakota State |
| Dylan Mauro | P | Southwestern Oklahoma State |
| Colton Peoples | LS | UT Martin |
| Gavin Barthiel | LB | Utah State |

=== Coaching staff additions ===
| Name | New Position | Previous Team | Previous Position | Source |
|---|---|---|---|---|
| Jimmy Rogers | Head coach | South Dakota State | Head coach | |
| Jesse Bobbit | Defensive coordinator/Linebackers | South Dakota State | Defensive coordinator | |
| Michael Banks | Cornerbacks | South Dakota State | Cornerbacks | |
| Pete Menage | Safeties | South Dakota State | Safeties | |
| Jalon Bibbs | Defensive Line | South Dakota State | Defensive Line | |
| Pat Cashmore | Special teams/Assistant tight ends | South Dakota State | Special teams | |
| Danny Freund | Offensive coordinator/Quarterbacks | South Dakota State | Co-offensive coordinator/Quarterbacks | |
| Taylor Lucas | Offensive line | South Dakota State | Assistant offensive line | |
| Donnell Kirkwood Jr. | Running backs | North Dakota | Running backs | |
| Chris Meyers | Tight ends | South Dakota State | Tight ends/Recruiting coordinator | |
| Jake Menage | Wide receivers | South Dakota State | Wide receivers | |

== Schedule ==
| Date | Time | Opponent | Site | TV | Result | Attendance |
|---|---|---|---|---|---|---|
| August 30 | 7:00 p.m. | No. 12 (FCS) Idaho* | Martin Stadium; Pullman, WA (Battle of the Palouse) | The CW | W 13–10 | 28,243 |
| September 6 | 7:15 p.m. | San Diego State*^{†} | Martin Stadium; Pullman, WA | The CW | W 36–13 | 24,330 |
| September 13 | 12:30 p.m. | at North Texas* | DATCU Stadium; Denton, TX | ESPNU | L 10–59 | 26,837 |
| September 20 | 4:30 p.m. | Washington* | Martin Stadium; Pullman, WA (Apple Cup) | CBS | L 24–59 | 32,952 |
| September 27 | 4:30 p.m. | at Colorado State* | Canvas Stadium; Fort Collins, CO | CBSSN | W 20–3 | 32,087 |
| October 11 | 9:45 a.m. | at No. 4 Ole Miss* | Vaught–Hemingway Stadium; Oxford, MS | SECN | L 21–24 | 66,392 |
| October 18 | 3:30 p.m. | at No. 18 Virginia* | Scott Stadium; Charlottesville, VA | The CW | L 20–22 | 56,048 |
| October 25 | 12:30 p.m. | Toledo* | Martin Stadium; Pullman, WA | The CW | W 28–7 | 27,646 |
| November 1 | 4:30 p.m. | at Oregon State* | Reser Stadium; Corvallis, OR | CBS | L 7–10 | 32,905 |
| November 15 | 7:00 p.m. | Louisiana Tech* | Martin Stadium; Pullman, WA | The CW | W 28–3 | 21,186 |
| November 22 | 10:00 a.m. | at James Madison* | Bridgeforth Stadium; Harrisonburg, VA | ESPN+ | L 20–24 | 25,156 |
| November 29 | 3:30 p.m. | Oregon State | Martin Stadium; Pullman, WA | The CW | W 32–8 | 24,806 |
| December 22 | 11:00 a.m. | vs. Utah State* | Albertsons Stadium; Boise, ID (Famous Idaho Potato Bowl) | ESPN | W 34–21 | 17,031 |
*Non-conference game; ^{†}Homecoming; Rankings from AP Poll (and CFP Rankings, after November 4) - Released prior to game; All times are in Pacific time

== Game summaries ==
=== vs No. 12 (FCS) Idaho (Battle of the Palouse) ===
No. 12 (FCS) Idaho Vandals (0–0) at Washington State Cougars (0–0) – Game summary

| Quarter | 1 | 2 | 3 | 4 | Total |
|---|---|---|---|---|---|
| No. 12 (FCS) Vandals | 0 | 0 | 0 | 10 | 10 |
| Cougars | 0 | 7 | 3 | 3 | 13 |

at Martin Stadium • Pullman, WA

- Date: August 30
- Game time: 7:00 p.m.
- Game weather: Sunny • Temperature: 80 °F (27 °C)
- Game attendance: 28,243
- Referee: Chris Wiggins
- TV announcers (The CW): Rick Allen (play-by-play), Ryan Leaf (analyst), and Nigel Burton (sideline)

Game information

First quarter

- No scoring plays.

Second quarter

- WSU – Joshua Meredith 6-yard pass from Jaxon Potter (Jack Stevens kick), 11:30. Cougars 7–0. Drive: 8 plays, 73 yards, 3:46.

Third quarter

- WSU – Jack Stevens 30-yard field goal, 1:18. Cougars 10–0. Drive: 4 plays, 5 yards, 2:02.

Fourth quarter

- IDHO – Art Williams 3-yard run (Cameron Pope kick), 7:25. Cougars 10–7. Drive: 16 plays, 75 yards, 8:53.
- IDHO – Cameron Pope 21-yard field goal, 1:42. Tied 10–10. Drive: 4 plays, 7 yards, 0:39.
- WSU – Jack Stevens 32-yard field goal, 0:03. Cougars 13–10. Drive: 9 plays, 59 yards, 1:33.

| Statistics | IDHO | WSU |
|---|---|---|
| First downs | 16 | 13 |
| Plays–yards | 65–221 | 45–211 |
| Rushes–yards | 45–188 | 22–3 |
| Passing yards | 33 | 208 |
| Passing: comp–att–int | 12–20–0 | 23–31–0 |
| Turnovers | 2 | 1 |
| Time of possession | 35:11 | 24:49 |

| Team | Category | Player | Statistics |
|---|---|---|---|
| Idaho | Passing | Joshua Wood | 12/20, 33 yards |
| Idaho | Rushing | Joshua Wood | 12 carries, 101 yards |
| Idaho | Receiving | Ryan Jezioro | 3 receptions, 26 yards |
| Washington State | Passing | Jaxon Potter | 23/30, 208 yards, TD |
| Washington State | Rushing | Kirby Vorhees | 6 carries, 19 yards |
| Washington State | Receiving | Tony Freeman | 7 receptions, 64 yards |

=== vs San Diego State ===
San Diego State Aztecs (1–0) at Washington State Cougars (1–0) – Game summary

| Quarter | 1 | 2 | 3 | 4 | Total |
|---|---|---|---|---|---|
| Aztecs | 7 | 0 | 6 | 0 | 13 |
| Cougars | 7 | 12 | 10 | 7 | 36 |

at Martin Stadium • Pullman, WA

- Date: September 6
- Game time: 7:15 p.m.
- Game weather: Sunny • Temperature: 80 °F (27 °C)
- Game attendance: 24,330
- Referee: Nolan Dumas
- TV announcers (The CW): Chris Fisher (play-by-play), Darius Walker (analyst), and Alex Brink (sideline)

Game information

First quarter

- SDSU – Jacob Bostick 35-yard pass from Jayden Denegal (Gabriel Plascencia kick), 10:00. Aztecs 7–0. Drive: 5 plays, 56 yards, 2:00.
- WSU – Trey Leckner 3-yard pass from Jaxon Potter (Jack Stevens kick), 5:18. Tied 7–7, Drive: 6 plays, 48 yards, 2:49.

Second quarter

- WSU – Jack Stevens 49-yard field goal, 14:48. Cougars 10–7, Drive: 13 plays, 39 yards, 3:55.
- WSU – Isaac Terrell 0-yard safety, 1:06. Cougars 12–7, Drive: 2 plays, -8 yards, 0:10.
- WSU – Trey Leckner 3-yard pass from Jaxon Potter (Jack Stevens kick), 0:26. Cougars 19–7, Drive: 4 plays, 62 yards, 0:32.

Third quarter

- WSU – Leon Neal Jr. 18-yard pass from Jaxon Potter (Jack Stevens kick), 10:55. Cougars 26–7, Drive: 7 plays, 75 yards, 4:05.
- WSU – Jack Stevens 42-yard field goal, 5:21. Cougars 29–7, Drive: 6 plays, 26 yards, 2:19.
- SDSU – Jayden Denegal 1-yard run (Two-Point Run Conversion Failed), 0:57. Cougars 29–13, Drive: 10 plays, 75 yards, 4:24.

Fourth quarter

- WSU – Julian Dugger 3-yard run (Jack Stevens kick), 2:48. Cougars 36–13, Drive: 12 plays, 42 yards, 6:17.

| Statistics | SDSU | WSU |
|---|---|---|
| First downs | 10 | 19 |
| Plays–yards | 16–215 | 48–396 |
| Rushes–yards | 82 | 139 |
| Passing yards | 133 | 257 |
| Passing: comp–att–int | 15–30–0 | 28–42–0 |
| Turnovers | 0 | 0 |
| Time of possession | 24:54 | 35:06 |

| Team | Category | Player | Statistics |
|---|---|---|---|
| San Diego State | Passing | Jayden Denegal | 15/30, 133 yards, TD |
| San Diego State | Rushing | Lucky Sutton | 15 carries, 88 yards |
| San Diego State | Receiving | Jordan Napier | 7 receptions, 69 yards |
| Washington State | Passing | Jaxon Potter | 28/42, 257 yards, 3 TD |
| Washington State | Rushing | Kirby Vorhees | 13 carries, 67 yards |
| Washington State | Receiving | Joshua Meredith | 8 receptions, 88 yards |

=== at North Texas ===
Washington State Cougars (2–0) at North Texas Mean Green (2–0) – Game summary

| Quarter | 1 | 2 | 3 | 4 | Total |
|---|---|---|---|---|---|
| Cougars | 3 | 0 | 0 | 7 | 10 |
| Mean Green | 14 | 28 | 10 | 7 | 59 |

at DATCU Stadium • Denton, TX

- Date: September 13
- Game time: 12:30 p.m.
- Game weather: Cloudy • Temperature: 71 °F (22 °C) • Wind: SE at 16 miles per hour (26 km/h)
- Game attendance: 26,837
- Referee: Edwin Lee
- TV announcers (ESPNU): Chuckie Kempf (play-by-play) and Darius Walker (analyst)

Game information

First quarter

- UNT – Makenzie McGill II 7-yard run (Kali Nguma kick), 10:33. Mean Green 7–0. Drive: 10 plays, 75 yards, 4:27.
- UNT – Jayden Becks 12-yard run (Kali Nguma kick), 0:08. Mean Green 14–0, Drive: 1 plays, 12 yards, 0:08.
- WSU - Jack Stevens 26-yard field goal, 1:27. Mean Green 14-3, Drive: 14 plays, 82 yards, 6:01.

Second quarter

- UNT – Brandon Young Jr. 2-yard pass from Drew Mestemaker (Kali Nguma kick), 7:07. Mean Green 21–3, Drive: 3 plays, 19 yards, 1:18.
- UNT – Tre Williams III 6-yard pass from Drew Mestemaker (Kali Nguma kick), 3:24. Mean Green 28–3, Drive: 6 plays, 30 yards, 1:39.
- UNT - Landon Sides 12-yard pass from Drew Mestemaker (Kali Nguma kick), 1:39. Mean Green 35-3, Drive: 1 play, 12 yards, 0:15.
- UNT - Jayden Becks 14-yard run (Kali Nguma kick), 0:54. Mean Green 42-3, Drive: 2 plays, 20 yards, 0:36.

Third quarter

- UNT - Kali Nguma 26-yard field goal, 9:46. Mean Green 45-3, Drive: 9 plays, 67 yards, 3:48.
- UNT - Ethan Day 2-yard pass from Drew Mestemaker (Kali Nguma kick), 2:30. Mean Green 52-3, Drive: 10 plays, 68 yards, 4:53.

Fourth quarter

- UNT - Caleb Hawkins 3-yard run (Kali Nguma kick), 8:54. Mean Green 59-3, Drive: 11 plays, 80 yards, 5:57.
- WSU - Zevi Eckhaus 2-yard run (Jack Stevens kick), 1:57. Mean Green 59-10, Drive: 13 plays, 75 yards, 6:57.

| Statistics | WSU | UNT |
|---|---|---|
| First downs | 17 | 24 |
| Plays–yards | 63–275 | 63–410 |
| Rushes–yards | 28–64 | 29–163 |
| Passing yards | 211 | 247 |
| Passing: comp–att–int | 23–35–3 | 29–34–0 |
| Turnovers | 5 | 0 |
| Time of possession | 31:26 | 28:34 |

| Team | Category | Player | Statistics |
|---|---|---|---|
| Washington State | Passing | Jaxon Potter | 16/23, 139 yards, 3 INT |
| Washington State | Rushing | Kirby Vorhees | 6 carries, 33 yards |
| Washington State | Receiving | Carter Pabst | 3 receptions, 65 yards |
| North Texas | Passing | Drew Mestemaker | 24/29, 211 yards, 4 TD |
| North Texas | Rushing | Makenzie McGill II | 9 carries, 67 yards, TD |
| North Texas | Receiving | Miles Coleman | 4 receptions, 44 yards |

=== vs Washington (Apple Cup) ===
Washington Huskies (2–0) at Washington State Cougars (2–1) – Game summary

| Quarter | 1 | 2 | 3 | 4 | Total |
|---|---|---|---|---|---|
| Huskies | 14 | 10 | 7 | 28 | 59 |
| Cougars | 0 | 10 | 14 | 0 | 24 |

at Martin Stadium • Pullman, WA

- Date: September 20
- Game time: 4:30 p.m.
- Game weather: Sunny • Temperature: 84 °F (29 °C) • Wind: SWS at 7 miles per hour (11 km/h)
- Game attendance: 32,952
- Referee: Tim O'Dey
- TV announcers (CBS): Rich Waltz (play-by-play), Logan Ryan (analyst), and Tiffany Blackmon (sideline)

Game information

First quarter

- WAS – Denzel Boston 29-yard pass from Demond Williams Jr. (Grady Gross kick), 10:53. Huskies 7–0. Drive: 9 plays, 75 yards, 4:07.
- WAS – Demond Williams Jr. 23-yard run (Grady Gross kick), 3:47. Huskies 14–0. Drive: 5 plays, 53 yards, 2:18.

Second quarter

- WSU – Beau Baker 12-yard pass from Zevi Eckhaus (Jack Stevens kick), 12:05. Huskies 14–7. Drive: 11 plays, 75 yards, 6:42.
- WAS – Jonah Coleman 12-yard run (Grady Gross kick), 10:02. Huskies 21–7. Drive: 4 plays, 75 yards, 2:03.
- WSU – Jack Stevens 36-yard field goal, 5:21. Huskies 21–10. Drive: 8 plays, 56 yards, 4:41.
- WAS – Grady Gross 51-yard field goal, 00;25. Huskies 24–10. Drive: 11 plays, 42 yards, 4:56.

Third quarter

- WSU – Devin Ellison 8-yard pass from Zevi Eckhaus (Jack Stevens kick), 10:39. Huskies 24–17. Drive: 7 plays, 75 yards, 4:21.
- WAS – Denzel Boston 7-yard pass from Demond Williams Jr. (Grady Gross kick), 8:16. Huskies 31–17. Drive: 5 plays, 35 yards, 2:20.
- WSU – Zevi Eckhaus 1-yard run (Jack Stevens kick), 2:38. Huskies 31–24. Drive: 9 plays, 75 yards, 5:38.

Fourth quarter

- WAS – Denzel Boston 7-yard pass from Demond Williams Jr. (Grady Gross kick), 12:49. Huskies 38–24. Drive: 11 plays, 75 yards, 4:49.
- WAS – Alex McLaughlin 47-yard interception (Grady Gross kick), 11:34. Huskies 45–24.
- WAS – Jonah Coleman 34-yard pass from Demond Williams Jr. (Grady Gross kick), 10:08. Huskies 52–24. Drive: 3 plays, 28 yards, 1:15.
- WAS – Omari Evans 59-yard pass from Demond Williams Jr. (Grady Gross kick), 2:40. Huskies 59–24. Drive: 4 plays, 80 yards, 2:08.

| Statistics | WASH | WSU |
|---|---|---|
| First downs | 23 | 21 |
| Plays–yards | 52–471 | 64–304 |
| Rushes–yards | 33–173 | 28–27 |
| Passing yards | 298 | 277 |
| Passing: comp–att–int | 16–19–0 | 25–36–2 |
| Turnovers | 0 | 3 |
| Time of possession | 24:14 | 35:46 |

| Team | Category | Player | Statistics |
|---|---|---|---|
| Washington | Passing | Demond Williams Jr. | 16/19, 298 yards, 4 TD |
| Washington | Rushing | Demond Williams Jr. | 13 carries, 88 yards, TD |
| Washington | Receiving | Denzel Boston | 6 receptions, 107 yards, 2 TD |
| Washington State | Passing | Zevi Eckhaus | 25/36, 277 yards, 2 TD, 2 INT |
| Washington State | Rushing | Kirby Vorhees | 5 carries, 13 yards |
| Washington State | Receiving | Joshua Meredith | 3 receptions, 70 yards |

=== at Colorado State ===
Washington State Cougars (2–2) at Colorado State Rams (1–2) – Game summary

| Quarter | 1 | 2 | 3 | 4 | Total |
|---|---|---|---|---|---|
| Cougars | 10 | 10 | 0 | 0 | 20 |
| Rams | 3 | 0 | 0 | 0 | 3 |

at Canvas Stadium • Fort Collins, CO

- Date: September 27
- Game time: 4:30 p.m.
- Game weather: Suuny • Temperature: 74 °F (23 °C) • Wind: SE at 5 miles per hour (8.0 km/h)
- Game attendance: 32,087
- Referee: Chris Wiggins
- TV announcers (CBSSN): Rich Waltz (play-by-play), Robert Turbin (analyst), and Tiffany Blackmon (sideline)

Game information

First quarter

- CSU - Isaiah Hankins 50-yard field goal, 11:32. Rams 3-0, Drive: 7 plays, 33 yards, 3:25.
- WSU – Jeremiah Noga 35-yard pass from Zevi Eckhaus (Jack Stevens kick), 8:43. Cougars 7-3, Drive: 5 plays, 82 yards, 2:45.
- WSU - Jack Stevens 37-yard field goal, 2:05. Cougars 10-3, Drive: 8 plays, 32 yards, 4:30.

Second quarter

- WSU – Jack Stevens 21-yard field goal, 5:16. Cougars 13-3, Drive: 9 plays, 74 yards, 4:54.
- WSU – Ademola Faleye 2-yard pass from Zevi Eckhaus (Jack Stevens kick), 1:01. Cougars 20-3, Drive: 7 plays, 48 yards, 2:15.

Third quarter

- No scoring plays.

Fourth quarter

- No scoring plays.

| Statistics | WSU | CSU |
|---|---|---|
| First downs | 19 | 20 |
| Plays–yards | 61–347 | 65–334 |
| Rushes–yards | 33–158 | 37–146 |
| Passing yards | 189 | 188 |
| Passing: comp–att–int | 16–28–0 | 19–28–0 |
| Turnovers | 0 | 1 |
| Time of possession | 31:23 | 28:37 |

| Team | Category | Player | Statistics |
|---|---|---|---|
| Washington State | Passing | Zevi Eckhaus | 16/28, 189 yards, 2 TD |
| Washington State | Rushing | Leo Pulalasi | 3 carries, 50 yards |
| Washington State | Receiving | Joshua Meredith | 4 receptions, 60 yards |
| Colorado State | Passing | Jackson Brousseau | 19/28, 188 yards |
| Colorado State | Rushing | Jalen Dupree | 13 carries, 68 yards |
| Colorado State | Receiving | Tommy Maher | 5 receptions, 51 yards |

=== at No. 4 Ole Miss ===
Washington State Cougars (3–2) at No. 4 Ole Miss Rebels (5–0) – Game summary

| Quarter | 1 | 2 | 3 | 4 | Total |
|---|---|---|---|---|---|
| Cougars | 7 | 0 | 7 | 7 | 21 |
| No. 4 Rebels | 0 | 10 | 7 | 7 | 24 |

at Vaught–Hemingway Stadium • Oxford, MS

- Date: October 11
- Game time: 9:45 a.m.
- Game weather: Sunny, 76 degrees
- Game attendance: 66,392
- Referee: Jeff Heaser
- TV announcers (SECN): Taylor Zarzour (play-by-play), Matt Stinchcomb (analyst), and Alyssa Lang (sideline)

Game information

First quarter

- WSU - Landon Wright 26-yard pass from Zevi Eckhaus (Jack Stevens kick), 1:58. Cougars 7-0, Drive: 9 plays, 71 yards, 4:33.

Second quarter

- MISS - Lucas Carneiro 40-yard field goal, 6:19. Cougars 7-3, Drive: 9 plays, 41 yards, 3:51.
- MISS - Dae'Quan Wright 2-yard pass from Trinidad Chambliss (Lucas Carneiro kick), 0:31. Rebels 10-7, Drive: 10 plays, 87 yards, 2:30.

Third quarter

- WSU – Kirby Vorhees 46-yard run (Jack Stevens kick), 10:19. Cougars 14-10, Drive: 7 plays, 75 yards, 4:41.
- MISS - Trinidad Chambliss 17 Yd Run (Lucas Carneiro Kick), 0:32. Rebels 17-14, Drive: 11 plays, 82 yards, 4:28.

Fourth quarter

- MISS - Cayden Lee 35-yard pass from Trinidad Chambliss (Lucas Carneiro kick), 6:51. Rebels 24-14, Drive: 4 plays, 60 yards, 1:31.
- WSU - Tony Freeman 19-yard pass from Zevi Eckhaus (Jack Stevens kick), 2:43. Rebels 24-21, Drive: 9 plays, 75 yards, 4:08.

| Statistics | WSU | MISS |
|---|---|---|
| First downs | 21 | 25 |
| Plays–yards | 59–345 | 70–439 |
| Rushes–yards | 28–127 | 41–186 |
| Passing yards | 218 | 253 |
| Passing: comp–att–int | 24–31–0 | 20–29–0 |
| Turnovers | 0 | 1 |
| Time of possession | 32:42 | 27:18 |

| Team | Category | Player | Statistics |
|---|---|---|---|
| Washington State | Passing | Zevi Eckhaus | 24/31, 218 yards, 2 TD |
| Washington State | Rushing | Kirby Vorhees | 10 rushes, 88 yards, TD |
| Washington State | Receiving | Tony Freeman | 9 receptions, 92 yards, TD |
| Ole Miss | Passing | Trinidad Chambliss | 20/29, 253 yards, 2 TD |
| Ole Miss | Rushing | Kewan Lacy | 24 rushes, 142 yards |
| Ole Miss | Receiving | Dae'Quan Wright | 4 receptions, 80 yards, TD |

=== at No. 18 Virginia ===
Washington State Cougars (3–3) at No. 18 Virginia Cavaliers (5–1) – Game summary

| Quarter | 1 | 2 | 3 | 4 | Total |
|---|---|---|---|---|---|
| Cougars | 7 | 10 | 3 | 0 | 20 |
| No. 18 Cavaliers | 7 | 0 | 3 | 12 | 22 |

at Scott Stadium • Charlottesville, VA

- Date: October 18
- Game time: 3:30 p.m.
- Game weather: Sunny, 70 degrees
- Game attendance: 56,048
- Referee: Riley Johnson
- TV announcers (The CW): Thom Brennaman (play-by-play), Will Blackmon (analyst), and Wes Bryant (sideline)

Game information

First quarter

- WSU - Joshua Meredith 32-yard pass from Zevi Eckhaus (Jack Stevens kick), 9:47. Cougars 7-0, Drive: 7 plays, 78 yards, 4:02.
- UVA - Cam Ross 19-yard run (Will Bettridge kick), 4:48. Tied 7-7, Drive: 5 plays, 59 yards, 2:02.

Second quarter

- WSU - Zevi Eckhaus 1-yard run (Jack Stevens kick), 6:35. Cougars 14-7, Drive: 8 plays, 64 yards, 5:01.
- WSU - Jack Stevens 37-yard field goal, 0:35. Cougars 17-7, Drive: 11 plays, 62 yards, 4:21.

Third quarter

- UVA - Will Bettridge 47-yard field goal, 8:38. Cougars 17-10, Drive: 9 plays, 46 yards, 4:16.
- WSU – Jack Stevens 42-yard field goal, 2:18. Cougars 20-10, Drive: 12 plays, 50 yards, 6:20.

Fourth quarter

- UVA - Harrison Waylee 2-yard run (Will Bettridge kick), 9:45. Cougars 20-17, Drive: 9 plays, 97 yards, 3:41.
- UVA - Will Bettridge 34-yard field goal, 2:55. Tied 20-20, Drive: 7 plays, 18 yards, 4:14.
- UVA - Team Safety, 2:41. Cavaliers 22-20, Drive: 3 plays, -2 yards, 0:14.

| Statistics | WSU | UVA |
|---|---|---|
| First downs | 18 | 13 |
| Plays–yards | 62–326 | 57–301 |
| Rushes–yards | 35–143 | 32–122 |
| Passing yards | 183 | 179 |
| Passing: comp–att–int | 18–27–2 | 15–25–0 |
| Turnovers | 2 | 0 |
| Time of possession | 34:14 | 25:46 |

| Team | Category | Player | Statistics |
|---|---|---|---|
| Washington State | Passing | Zevi Eckhaus | 18/27, 183 yards, TD, 2 INT |
| Washington State | Rushing | Kirby Vorhees | 16 carries, 45 yards |
| Washington State | Receiving | Joshua Meredith | 7 catches, 108 yards, TD |
| Virginia | Passing | Chandler Morris | 15/25, 179 yards |
| Virginia | Rushing | J'Mari Taylor | 17 carries, 47 yards |
| Virginia | Receiving | Jahmal Edrine | 5 catches, 102 yards |

=== vs Toledo ===
Toledo Rockets (4–3) at Washington State Cougars (3–4) – Game summary

| Quarter | 1 | 2 | 3 | 4 | Total |
|---|---|---|---|---|---|
| Rockets | 0 | 7 | 0 | 0 | 7 |
| Cougars | 0 | 21 | 0 | 7 | 28 |

at Martin Stadium • Pullman, WA

- Date: October 25
- Game time: 12:30 p.m.
- Game weather: Cloudy, 55 degrees
- Game attendance: 27,646
- Referee: Matt Packowski
- TV announcers (The CW): Ted Robinson (play-by-play), Ryan Leaf (analyst) and Nigel Burton (sideline)

Game information

First quarter

- No scoring plays.

Second quarter

- WSU - Zevi Eckhaus 7-yard run (Jack Stevens kick), 12:07. Cougars 7-0, Drive: 11 plays, 89 yards, 6:42.
- WSU - Tony Freeman 15-yard pass from Zevi Eckhaus (Jack Stevens kick), 4:00. Cougars 14-0, Drive: 11 plays, 80 yards, 5:33.
- WSU -Carter Pabst 35-yard pass from Zevi Eckhaus (Jack Stevens kick), 0:51. Cougars 21-0, Drive: 8 plays, 83 yards, 1:16.
- TOL - Junior Vandeross III 24-yard pass from Tucker Gleason (Dylan Cunanan kick), 0:13. Cougars 21-7, Drive: 6 plays, 65 yards, 0:38.

Third quarter

- No scoring plays.

Fourth quarter

- WSU - Kirby Vorhees 6-yard run (Jack Stevens kick), 2:21. Cougars 28-7, Drive: 12 plays, 65 yards, 6:34.

| Statistics | TOL | WSU |
|---|---|---|
| First downs | 15 | 20 |
| Plays–yards | 66–299 | 66–321 |
| Rushes–yards | 24–61 | 44–162 |
| Passing yards | 238 | 159 |
| Passing: comp–att–int | 26–42–1 | 10–22–2 |
| Turnovers | 1 | 2 |
| Time of possession | 27:27 | 32:33 |

| Team | Category | Player | Statistics |
|---|---|---|---|
| Toledo | Passing | Tucker Gleason | 26/41, 238 yards, TD, INT |
| Toledo | Rushing | Kenji Christian | 11 carries, 33 yards |
| Toledo | Receiving | Jacob Peterson | 5 receptions, 58 yards |
| Washington State | Passing | Zevi Eckhaus | 10/22, 159 yards, 2 TD, 2 INT |
| Washington State | Rushing | Zevi Eckhaus | 15 carries, 74 yards, TD |
| Washington State | Receiving | Joshua Meredith | 4 receptions, 81 yards |

=== at Oregon State ===
Washington State Cougars (4–4) at Oregon State Beavers (1–7) – Game summary

| Quarter | 1 | 2 | 3 | 4 | Total |
|---|---|---|---|---|---|
| Cougars | 0 | 7 | 0 | 0 | 7 |
| Beavers | 0 | 3 | 0 | 7 | 10 |

at Reser Stadium • Corvallis, OR

- Date: November 1
- Game time: 4:30 p.m.
- Game weather: Cloudy, 58 °F (14 °C)
- Game attendance: 32,905
- Referee: John Love
- TV announcers (CBS): Chris Lewis (play-by-play), Logan Ryan (analyst) and Brandon Baylor (sideline)

Game information

First quarter

- No scoring plays

Second quarter

- ORST – Caleb Ojeda 35-yard field goal, 2:52. Beavers 3–0. Drive: 8 plays, 39 yards, 3:44.
- WSU – Kirby Vorhees 3-yard run (Jack Stevens kick), 0:44. Cougars 7–3. Drive: 7 plays, 35 yards, 2:08.

Third quarter

- No scoring plays

Fourth quarter

- ORST – Anthony Hankerson 1-yard run (Caleb Ojeda kick), 9:52. Beavers 10–7. Drive: 4 plays, 64 yards, 1:44.

| Statistics | WSU | ORST |
|---|---|---|
| First downs | 16 | 15 |
| Plays–yards | 59–271 | 59–184 |
| Rushes–yards | 35–125 | 41–124 |
| Passing yards | 146 | 60 |
| Passing: comp–att–int | 13–24–2 | 12–18–0 |
| Turnovers | 2 | 0 |
| Time of possession | 28:48 | 31:12 |

| Team | Category | Player | Statistics |
|---|---|---|---|
| Washington State | Passing | Zevi Eckhaus | 13/24, 146 yards, 2 INT |
| Washington State | Rushing | Kirby Vorhees | 10 carries, 46 yards, TD |
| Washington State | Receiving | Joshua Meredith | 4 receptions, 44 yards |
| Oregon State | Passing | Gabarri Johnson | 10/15, 33 yards |
| Oregon State | Rushing | Anthony Hankerson | 25 carries, 132 yards, TD |
| Oregon State | Receiving | Taz Reddicks | 2 receptions, 37 yards |

=== vs Louisiana Tech ===
Louisiana Tech Bulldogs (5-4) vs Washington State Cougars (4–5) – Game summary

| Quarter | 1 | 2 | 3 | 4 | Total |
|---|---|---|---|---|---|
| Bulldogs | 0 | 3 | 0 | 0 | 3 |
| Cougars | 7 | 7 | 0 | 14 | 28 |

at Martin Stadium • Pullman, WA

- Date: November 15
- Game time: 7:00 p.m.
- Game weather: Sunny, 50 °F (10 °C)
- Game attendance: 21,186
- Referee: John Love
- TV announcers (The CW): Ted Robinson (play-by-play), Ryan Leaf (analyst) and Nigel Burton (sideline)

Game information

First quarter

- WSU – Joshua Meredith 23-yard pass from Zevi Eckhaus (Jack Stevens kick), 8:51. Cougars 7–0. Drive: 6 plays, 48 yards, 3:36.

Second quarter

- WSU – Zevi Eckhaus 7-yard run (Jack Stevens kick), 12:11. Cougars 14–0. Drive: 6 plays, 17 yards, 2:27.
- LT – Drew Henderson 51-yard field goal, 0:00. Cougars 14–3. Drive: 8 plays, 30 yards, 1:32.

Third quarter

- No scoring plays.

Fourth quarter

- WSU – Zevi Eckhaus 1-yard run (Jack Stevens kick), 13:30. Cougars 21–3. Drive: 14 plays, 66 yards, 8:19.
- WSU – Kirby Vorhees 19-yard run (Jack Stevens kick), 1:12. Cougars 28–3. Drive: 12 plays, 70 yards, 7:34.

| Statistics | LT | WSU |
|---|---|---|
| First downs | 11 | 19 |
| Plays–yards | 51–167 | 64–303 |
| Rushes–yards | 30–107 | 39–157 |
| Passing yards | 60 | 146 |
| Passing: comp–att–int | 9–21–1 | 17–25–0 |
| Turnovers | 1 | 0 |
| Time of possession | 24:57 | 35:03 |

| Team | Category | Player | Statistics |
|---|---|---|---|
| Louisiana Tech | Passing | Evan Bullock | 4/10, 36 yards |
| Louisiana Tech | Rushing | Andrew Burnette | 5 carries, 39 yards |
| Louisiana Tech | Receiving | Eli Finley | 3 receptions, 21 yards |
| Washington State | Passing | Zevi Eckhaus | 17/25, 146 yards, TD |
| Washington State | Rushing | Kirby Vorhees | 16 carries, 76 yards, TD |
| Washington State | Receiving | Joshua Meredith | 5 receptions, 70 yards, TD |

=== at James Madison ===
Washington State Cougars (5-5) at James Madison Dukes (9-1) – Game summary

| Quarter | 1 | 2 | 3 | 4 | Total |
|---|---|---|---|---|---|
| Cougars | 3 | 14 | 0 | 3 | 20 |
| Dukes | 3 | 7 | 7 | 7 | 24 |

at Bridgeforth Stadium • Harrisonburg, VA

- Date: November 22
- Game time: 10:00 a.m.
- Game weather: Cloudy, 55 degrees
- Game attendance: 25,156
- Referee: Jeremy Parker
- TV announcers (ESPN+): Curt Dudley (play-by-play), Brian Barlow (analyst) and David Hulvey (sideline)

Game information

First quarter

- WSU – Jack Stevens 29-yard field goal, 8:06. Cougars 3–0. Drive: 10 plays, 20 yards, 3:27.
- JMU - Morgan Suarez 45-yard field goal, 5:10. Tied 3-3. Drive: 7 plays, 38 yards, 2:56.

Second quarter

- JMU – Justin Eaglin 37-yard interception return (Morgan Suarez kick), 13:27. Dukes 10-3. Drive: N/A
- WSU – Tony Freeman 48-yard pass from Zevi Eckhaus (Jack Stevens kick), 7:26. Tied 10-10. Drive: 2 plays, 50 yards, :45.
- WSU - Zevi Eckhaus 4-yard run (Jack Stevens kick), :48. Cougars 17-10. Drive: 11 plays, 67 yards, 4:54.

Third quarter

- JMU - Braeden Wisloski 68-yard pass from Alonza Barnett III (Morgan Suarez kick), 2:15. Tied 17-17. Drive: 1 play, 68 yards, :11.

Fourth quarter

- WSU – Jack Stevens 36-yard field goal, 9:24. Cougars 20-17. Drive: 13 plays, 46 yards, 7:44.
- JMU - Wayne Knight 58-yard run (Morgan Suarez kick), 6:24. Drive: 6 plays, 86 yards, 2:54.

| Statistics | WSU | JMU |
|---|---|---|
| First downs | 19 | 14 |
| Plays–yards | 68–301 | 50–319 |
| Rushes–yards | 37–130 | 32–175 |
| Passing yards | 171 | 144 |
| Passing: comp–att–int | 19-31-1 | 9-18-1 |
| Turnovers | 1 | 1 |
| Time of possession | 34:58 | 25:02 |

| Team | Category | Player | Statistics |
|---|---|---|---|
| Washington State | Passing | Zevi Eckhaus | 19/31, 171 yards, TD, INT |
| Washington State | Rushing | Kirby Vorhees | 19 carries, 61 yards |
| Washington State | Receiving | Tony Freeman | 6 receptions, 81 yards, TD |
| James Madison | Passing | Alonza Barnett III | 9/19, 144 yards, TD, INT |
| James Madison | Rushing | Wayne Knight | 15 carries, 126 yards, TD |
| James Madison | Receiving | Braeden Wisloski | 1 reception, 68 yards, TD |

=== vs Oregon State ===
Oregon State Beavers (2-9) at Washington State Cougars (5-6) – Game summary

| Quarter | 1 | 2 | 3 | 4 | Total |
|---|---|---|---|---|---|
| Beavers | 0 | 0 | 0 | 8 | 8 |
| Cougars | 3 | 16 | 6 | 7 | 32 |

at Martin Stadium • Pullman, WA

- Date: November 29
- Game time: 3:30 p.m.
- Game weather: Sunny
- Game attendance: 24,806
- Referee: Chris Wiggins
- TV announcers (The CW): Ted Robinson (play-by-play), Ryan Leaf (analyst) and Nigel Burton (sideline)

Game information

First quarter

- WSU - Jack Stevens 26-yard field goal, 9:26. Cougars 3-0, Drive: 12 plays, 70 yards, 5:29.

Second quarter

- WSU - Jack Stevens 44-yard field goal, 14:08. Cougars 6-0, Drive: 8 plays, 33 yards, 3:48.
- WSU - Kirby Vorhees 2-yard run (Jack Stevens kick), 11:54. Cougars 13-0, Drive: 3 plays, 26 yards, 1:12.
- WSU - Trey Leckner 1-yard pass from Zevi Eckhaus (Two-Point Run Conversion Failed), 1:34. Cougars 19-0, Drive: 4 plays, 45 yards, 1:01.

Third quarter

- WSU – Zevi Eckhaus 5-yard run (Jack Stevens kick), 4:51. Cougars 25-0, Drive: 4 plays, 29 yards, 2:15.

Fourth quarter

- ORST - Trent Walker 12-yard pass from Tristan Ti'a (Jake Reichle run for Two-Point Conversion), 5:49. Cougars 25-8, Drive: 4 plays, 70 yards, 1:48.
- WSU - Angel Johnson 2-yard run (Jack Stevens kick), 5:01. Cougars 32-8, Drive: 3 plays, 44 yards, 0:48.

| Statistics | ORST | WSU |
|---|---|---|
| First downs | 17 | 22 |
| Plays–yards | 80-280 | 64-383 |
| Rushes–yards | 29-40 | 34-186 |
| Passing yards | 240 | 197 |
| Passing: comp–att–int | 28-41-2 | 17-28-0 |
| Turnovers | 3 | 2 |
| Time of possession | 31:26 | 28:34 |

| Team | Category | Player | Statistics |
|---|---|---|---|
| Oregon State | Passing | Tristan Ti'a | 28/41, 240 yards, TD, 2 INT |
| Oregon State | Rushing | Anthony Hankerson | 16 carries, 71 yards |
| Oregon State | Receiving | Trent Walker | 7 receptions, 61 yards, TD |
| Washington State | Passing | Zevi Eckhaus | 18/28, 197 yards, TD |
| Washington State | Rushing | Angel Johnson | 4 carries, 64 yards, TD |
| Washington State | Receiving | Tony Freeman | 7 receptions, 84 yards |

=== vs. Utah State (Famous Idaho Potato Bowl) ===
2025 Famous Idaho Potato Bowl
Washington State Cougars (6-6) vs. Utah State Aggies (6-6) – Game summary

| Quarter | 1 | 2 | 3 | 4 | Total |
|---|---|---|---|---|---|
| Cougars | 7 | 7 | 6 | 14 | 34 |
| Aggies | 0 | 0 | 7 | 14 | 21 |

at Albertsons Stadium • Boise, ID

- Date: December 22
- Game time: 11:00 a.m. PST
- Game attendance: 17,031
- Referee: Garrett Dickerson
- TV announcers (ESPN): Chuckie Kempf (play-by-play), Darius Walker (analyst) and Tori Petry (sideline)

Game information

First quarter

- WSU - Mackenzie Alleyne 41-yard pass from Zevi Eckhaus (Jack Stevens kick), 7:08. Cougars 7-0, Drive: 4 plays, 56 yards, 1:37.

Second quarter

- WSU - Hudson Cederland 1-yard pass from Zevi Eckhaus (Jack Stevens kick), 4:43. Cougars 14-0, Drive: 8 plays, 47 yards, 3:58.

Third quarter

- WSU - Jack Stevens 23-yard field goal, 11:25. Cougars 17-0, Drive: 7 plays, 79 yards, 3:28.
- WSU - Jack Stevens 25-yard field goal, 7:31. Cougars 20-0, Drive: 7 plays, 75 yards, 2:11.
- USU - Bryson Barnes 2-yard run (Tanner Rinker kick), 2:27. Cougars 20-7, Drive: 5 plays, 60 yards, 1:20.

Fourth quarter

- WSU - Landon Wright 39-yard pass from Zevi Eckhaus (Jack Stevens kick), 14:11. Cougars 27-7, Drive: 7 plays, 79 yards, 3:09.
- USU - Brady Boyd 21-yard pass from Jacob Conover (Tanner Rinker kick), 10:09. Cougars 27-14, Drive: 7 plays, 75 yards, 4:02.
- WSU - Julian Dugger 34-yard run (Jack Stevens kick), 4:06. Cougars 34-14, Drive: 11 plays, 79 yards, 5:57.
- USU - Javen Jacobs 26-yard pass from Jacob Conover (Tanner Rinker kick), 1:48. Cougars 34-21, Drive: 7 plays, 65 yards, 2:18.

| Statistics | WSU | USU |
|---|---|---|
| First downs | 30 | 13 |
| Plays–yards | 91-628 | 54-254 |
| Rushes–yards | 41-255 | 26-60 |
| Passing yards | 373 | 194 |
| Passing: comp–att–int | 28-47-3 | 14-27-1 |
| Turnovers | 3 | 1 |
| Time of possession | 35:48 | 24:12 |

| Team | Category | Player | Statistics |
|---|---|---|---|
| Washington State | Passing | Zevi Eckhaus | 26/44, 334 yards, 3 INT |
| Washington State | Rushing | Maxwell Woods | 9 carries, 117 yards |
| Washington State | Receiving | Joshua Meredith | 8 receptions, 84 yards |
| Utah State | Passing | Bryson Barnes | 9/21, 116 yards, INT |
| Utah State | Rushing | Javen Jacobs | 3 carries, 24 yards |
| Utah State | Receiving | Brady Boyd | 4 receptions, 99 yards, TD |
