= 2025 Oregon State Beavers football team =

American college football season

2025 Oregon State Beavers football
- Conference: Pac-12 Conference
- Record: 2–10 (0–1 Pac-12)
- Head coach: Trent Bray (2nd season; first seven games); Robb Akey (interim; remainder of season)
- Offensive coordinator: Ryan Gunderson (2nd season)
- Offensive scheme: Pro-style
- Co-defensive coordinator: Rod Chance (1st season)
- Base defense: Multiple 4–2–5
- Home stadium: Reser Stadium

2025 Pac-12 Conference football standings
	Conf.			Overall
Team	W		L	W		L
Washington State	1	–	0	7	–	6
Oregon State	0	–	1	2	–	10
Rankings from CFP Rankings

The 2025 Oregon State Beavers football team represented Oregon State University in the Pac-12 Conference during the 2025 NCAA Division I FBS football season. The Beavers played their home games on campus at Reser Stadium in Corvallis, Oregon.

The Beavers were initially led by second-year head coach Trent Bray until he was fired after going winless in the team's first seven games. Special assistant Robb Akey was named interim coach for the remainder of the season.

The Oregon State Beavers drew an average home attendance of 30,145.

== Offseason ==
=== Transfers ===
==== Outgoing ====
Player	Position	Destination
Quincy Wright	DT	Arkansas State
Ugochukwu Odoemelam	S	Butte College
Melvin Jordan IV	LB	Georgia Tech
Kai Richardson	DE	Idaho
Luka Vincic	OL	Michigan State
DJ Wesolak	DE	Missouri State
Jack Kane	S	Rice
Jordan Anderson	WR	Sacramento State
Dom Montiel	QB	Southern Oregon
Ben Gulbranson	QB	Stanford
Gevani McCoy	QB	Temple
Jailen Holmes	WR	UAB
Isaiah Chisom	LB	UCLA
Andre Jordan Jr.	DB	UCLA
Jeremiah Noga	WR	Washington State
Montrel Hatten Jr.	WR	West Texas A&M
Oluwaseyi Omotosho	DL	West Virginia

==== Incoming ====
Player	Position	Previous school
JT Hand	OL	Arizona
Jackson Bowers	TE	BYU
Maalik Murphy	QB	Duke
Will Larkins	OT	Georgia State
Tyjai Hopper	CB	James Madison
Marquis Crosby	RB	Louisiana Tech
Riley Williams	TE	Miami (FL)
Kai Wallin	DL	Nebraska
Josiah Timoteo	OL	Nevada
Walker Harris	DE	Southern Utah
Keyon Cox	OL	UCF
Raesjon Davis	LB	USC
TJ Crandall	DB	West Virginia
Tahjae Mullix	DL	Western Carolina

== Schedule ==
Date	Time	Opponent	Site	TV	Result	Attendance
August 30	7:30 p.m.	California*	Reser Stadium; Corvallis, OR	ESPN	L 15–34	31,630
September 6	12:30 p.m.	Fresno State*	Reser Stadium; Corvallis, OR	The CW	L 27–36	28,068
September 13	12:30 p.m.	at No. 21 Texas Tech*	Jones AT&T Stadium; Lubbock, TX	FOX	L 14–45	60,229
September 20	12:00 p.m.	at No. 6 Oregon*	Autzen Stadium; Eugene, OR (rivalry)	BTN	L 7–41	58,571
September 26	7:30 p.m.	Houston*	Reser Stadium; Corvallis, OR	ESPN	L 24–27 ^{OT}	29,338
October 4	12:30 p.m.	at Appalachian State*	Kidd Brewer Stadium; Boone, NC	ESPN+	L 23–27	35,021
October 11	12:30 p.m.	Wake Forest*^{†}	Reser Stadium; Corvallis, OR	The CW	L 14–39	29,710
October 18	7:00 p.m.	No. 23 (FCS) Lafayette*	Reser Stadium; Corvallis, OR	The CW	W 45–13	27,735
November 1	4:30 p.m.	Washington State*	Reser Stadium; Corvallis, OR	CBS	W 10–7	32,905
November 8	7:00 p.m.	Sam Houston*	Reser Stadium; Corvallis, OR	The CW	L 17–21	31,626
November 15	10:00 a.m.	at Tulsa*	Skelly Field at H. A. Chapman Stadium; Tulsa, OK	ESPN+	L 14–31	15,034
November 29	3:30 p.m.	at Washington State	Martin Stadium; Pullman, WA	The CW	L 8–32	24,806
*Non-conference game; ^{†}Homecoming; Rankings from AP Poll - Released prior to game; All times are in Pacific time

== Game summaries ==
=== vs California ===
California Golden Bears (0–0) at Oregon State Beavers (0–0) – Game summary

Quarter	1	2	3	4	Total
Golden Bears	14	3	7	10	34
Beavers	0	3	6	6	15

at Reser Stadium • Corvallis, Oregon

- Date: August 30
- Game time: 7:30 p.m.
- Game weather: Cloudy
- Game attendance: 31,630
- Referee: Gary Patterson
- TV announcers (ESPN): Dave Flemming, Brock Osweiler, and Stormy Buonantony

Game information

First quarter

- CAL – Mason Mini 19-yard pass from Jaron-Keawe Sagapolutele (Chase Meyer kick), 11:23. Golden Bears 7–0. Drive: 8 plays, 73 yards, 3:37.
- CAL – Trond Grizzell 32-yard pass from Jaron-Keawe Sagapolutele (Chase Meyer kick), 7:56. Golden Bears 14–0. Drive: 6 plays, 66 yards, 2:26.

Second quarter

- ORST – Caleb Ojeda 53-yard field goal, 9:29. Golden Bears 14–3. Drive: 6 plays, 43 yards, 2:56.
- CAL – Abram Murray 49-yard field goal, 0:00. Golden Bears 17–3. Drive: 5 plays, 34 yards, 0:42.

Third quarter

- CAL – Landon Morris 4-yard pass from Jaron-Keawe Sagapolutele (Chase Meyer kick), 11:37. Golden Bears 24–3. Drive: 4 plays, 40 yards, 1:41.
- ORST – Anthony Hankerson 2-yard run (pass failed), 4:16. Golden Bears 24–9. Drive: 11 plays, 84 yards, 7:21.

Fourth quarter

- CAL – Brandon High Jr. 2-yard run (Chase Meyer kick), 12:02. Golden Bears 31–9. Drive: 1 play, 2 yards, 0:06.
- ORST – Maalik Murphy 3-yard run (run failed), 8:16. Golden Bears 31–15. Drive: 10 plays, 78 yards, 4:26.
- CAL – Chase Meyer 23-yard field goal, 0:20. Golden Bears 34–15. Drive: 10 plays, 29 yards, 4:58.

Statistics	CAL	ORST
First downs	15	19
Plays–yards	71–351	62–313
Rushes–yards	32–122	27–65
Passing yards	234	248
Passing: comp–att–int	20-30-0	22–34–1
Turnovers	0	2
Time of possession	30:08	29:52

Team	Category	Player	Statistics
California	Passing	Jaron-Keawe Sagapolutele	20/30, 234 yards, 3 TD
California	Rushing	Brandon High Jr.	10 carries, 41 yards, TD
California	Receiving	Trond Grizzell	5 receptions, 83 yards, TD
Oregon State	Passing	Maalik Murphy	21/33, 244 yards, INT
Oregon State	Rushing	Anthony Hankerson	15 carries, 42 yards, TD
Oregon State	Receiving	Trent Walker	9 receptions, 136 yards

=== vs Fresno State ===
Fresno State Bulldogs (1–1) at Oregon State Beavers (0–1) – Game summary

Quarter	1	2	3	4	Total
Bulldogs	7	13	0	16	36
Beavers	6	9	6	6	27

at Reser Stadium • Corvallis, OR

- Date: September 6, 2025
- Game time: 12:30 p.m. PDT
- Game attendance: 28,068
- Referee: John Love
- TV announcers (The CW): Ted Robinson (play-by-play), Ryan Leaf (analyst) and Nigel Burton (sideline)

Game information

First quarter

- (12:24) FRES – E. J. Warner 30-yard run, Dylan Lynch kick (Drive: 6 plays, 68 yards, 2:29; Fresno State 7–0)
- (7:24) ORST – Eddie Freauff 5-yard pass from Maalik Murphy, Two–point conversion failed (Drive: 11 plays, 75 yards, 5:00; Fresno State 7–6)

Second quarter

- (11:27) ORST – Malachi Durant 10-yard pass from Maalik Murphy, Two–point conversion failed (Drive: 7 plays, 79 yards, 3:19; Oregon State 12–7)
- (8:43) FRES – Rayshon Luke 44-yard run, Dylan Lynch kick (Drive: 5 plays, 72 yards, 2:38; Fresno State 14–12)
- (3:23) ORST – Caleb Ojeda 27-yard field goal (Drive: 11 plays, 60 yards, 5:12; Oregon State 15–14)
- (0:45) FRES – Jaden Carrillo 42-yard punt return, Two–point conversion failed (Fresno State 20–15)

Third quarter

- (3:44) ORST – Jake Reichie 4-yard pass from Maalik Murphy, Two–point conversion failed (Drive: 18 plays, 68 yards, 11:16; Oregon State 21–20)

Fourth quarter

- (13:57) FRES – Dylan Lynch 34-yard field goal (Drive: 9 plays, 50 yards, 4:47; Fresno State 23–21)
- (9:06) FRES – Dylan Lynch 28-yard field goal (Drive: 5 plays, 11 yards, 2:12; Fresno State 26–21)
- (1:19) ORST – David Wells Jr. 34-yard pass from Maalik Murphy, Two–point conversion failed (Drive: 6 plays, 68 yards, 0:49; Oregon State 27–26)
- (0:29) FRES – Dylan Lynch 28-yard field goal (Drive: 7 plays, 44 yards, 0:44; Fresno State 29–27)
- (0:04) FRES – Jaden Carrillo 45-yard punt return, Dylan Lynch kick (Fresno State 36–27)

Statistics	FRES	ORST
First downs	15	30
Plays–yards	46–318	83–528
Rushes–yards	28–197	34–140
Passing yards	121	388
Passing: Comp–Att–Int	13–18–1	32–49–2
Turnovers	1	2
Time of possession	22:35	37:35

Team	Category	Player	Statistics
Fresno State	Passing	E. J. Warner	13/18, 121 yards, INT
Fresno State	Rushing	Rayshon Luke	12 carries, 86 yards, 2 TD
Fresno State	Receiving	Josiah Freeman	5 receptions, 82 yards
Oregon State	Passing	Maalik Murphy	31/48, 371 yards, 4 TD, 2 INT
Oregon State	Rushing	Anthony Hankerson	25 carries, 136 yards
Oregon State	Receiving	Taz Reddicks	11 receptions, 158 yards

=== at No. 21 Texas Tech ===
Oregon State Beavers (0–2) at No. 21 Texas Tech Red Raiders (2–0) – Game summary

Quarter	1	2	3	4	Total
Beavers	0	0	0	14	14
No. 21 Red Raiders	14	14	10	7	45

at Jones AT&T Stadium • Lubbock, Texas

- Date: September 13
- Game time: 12:30 p.m.
- Game weather: Cloudy, 81 °F (27 °C)
- Game attendance: 60,229
- Referee: Chris Wiggins
- TV announcers (FOX): Tim Brando, Devin Gardner, and Josh Sims

Game information

First quarter

- TTU – Coy Eakin 38-yard pass from Behren Morton (Stone Harrington kick), 12:00. Red Raiders 7–0. Drive: 5 plays, 50 yards, 0:57.
- TTU – Caleb Douglas 61-yard pass from Behren Morton (Upton Bellenfant kick), 6:27. Red Raiders 14–0. Drive: 5 plays, 79 yards, 2:00.

Second quarter

- TTU – J'Koby Williams 30-yard pass from Behren Morton (Stone Harrington kick), 10:01. Red Raiders 21–0. Drive: 10 plays, 49 yards, 0:31.
- TTU – J'Koby Williams 3-yard run (Upton Bellenfant kick), 6:35. Red Raiders 28–0. Drive: 7 plays, 70 yards, 1:26.

Third quarter

- TTU – Terrance Carter Jr. 23-yard pass from Behren Morton (Stone Harrington kick), 11:26. Red Raiders 35–0. Drive: 10 plays, 84 yards, 3:27.
- TTU – Upton Bellenfant 21-yard field goal, 1:07. Red Raiders 38–0. Drive: 12 plays, 94 yards, 5:32.

Fourth quarter

- TTU – Cameron Dickey 4-yard run (Ian Hershey kick), 10:43. Red Raiders 45–0. Drive: 9 plays, 55 yards, 4:11.
- ORST – Bryce Caufield 6-yard pass from Maalik Murphy (Caleb Ojeda kick), 5:05. Red Raiders 45–7. Drive: 5 plays, 72 yards, 3:03.
- ORST – Karson Boschma 26-yard pass from Maalik Murphy (Caleb Ojeda kick), 1:53. Red Raiders 45–14. Drive: 5 plays, 40 yards, 3:16.

Statistics	ORST	TTU
First downs	17	30
Plays–yards	68–289	81–599
Rushes–yards	22–8	40–121
Passing yards	281	478
Passing: comp–att–int	25–46–2	27–41–2
Turnovers	2	2
Time of possession	29:00	31:00

Team	Category	Player	Statistics
Oregon State	Passing	Maalik Murphy	25/44, 281 yards, 2 TD, 2 INT
Oregon State	Rushing	Anthony Hankerson	11 carries, 12 yards
Oregon State	Receiving	David Wells Jr.	6 receptions, 103 yards
Texas Tech	Passing	Behren Morton	23/35, 464 yards, 4 TD, INT
Texas Tech	Rushing	Cameron Dickey	16 carries, 65 yards, TD
Texas Tech	Receiving	Coy Eakin	5 receptions, 123 yards, TD

=== at No. 6 Oregon (Civil War) ===
Oregon State Beavers (0–3) at No. 6 Oregon Ducks (3–0) – Game summary

Quarter	1	2	3	4	Total
Beavers	7	0	0	0	7
No. 6 Ducks	7	14	10	10	41

at Autzen Stadium • Eugene, Oregon

- Date: September 20
- Game time: 12:00 p.m.
- Game weather: Sunny
- Game attendance: 58,571
- Referee: John Love
- TV announcers (BTN): Jeff Levering, Jake Butt, and Brooke Fletcher

Game information

First quarter

- (12:10) ORE – Dakorien Moore 22-yard pass from Dante Moore, Atticus Sappington kick (Drive: 7 plays, 75 yards, 2:50; ORE 7-0)
- (1:50) ORST – Anthony Hankerson 1-yard run, Caleb Ojeda kick (Drive: 13 plays, 64 yards, 7:40; 7-7)

Second quarter

- (5:40) ORE – Kenyon Sadiq 23-yard pass from Dante Moore, Atticus Sappington kick (Drive: 12 plays, 92 yards, 6:10; ORE 14-7)
- (0:21) ORE – Jordon Davison 3-yard run, Atticus Sappington kick (Drive: 8 plays, 80 yards, 1:27; ORE 21-7)

Third quarter

- (8:18) ORE – Jeremiah McClellan 13-yard pass from Dante Moore, Gage Hurych kick (Drive: 11 plays, 72 yards, 5:36; ORE 28-7)
- (1:01) ORE – Atticus Sappington 24-yard field goal (Drive: 11 plays, 59 yards, 6:21; ORE 31-7)

Fourth quarter

- (14:20) ORE – Gary Bryant Jr. 49-yard pass from Dante Moore, Atticus Sappington kick (Drive: 3 plays, 74 yards, 0:45; ORE 38-7)
- (5:05) ORE – Atticus Sappington 28-yard field goal (Drive: 6 plays, 18 yards, 2:48; ORE 411-7)

Statistics	ORST	ORE
First downs	8	29
Plays–yards	48–147	77–585
Rushes–yards	26–67	47–280
Passing yards	80	305
Passing: comp–att–int	7–22–0	21–31–0
Turnovers	1	0
Time of possession	23:05	36:55

Team	Category	Player	Statistics
Oregon State	Passing	Maalik Murphy	5/18, 68 yards
Oregon State	Rushing	Anthony Hankerson	14 carries, 38 yards, TD
Oregon State	Receiving	Taz Reddicks	2 receptions, 27 yards
Oregon	Passing	Dante Moore	21/31, 305 yards, 4 TD
Oregon	Rushing	Jayden Limar	12 carries, 70 yards
Oregon	Receiving	Gary Bryant Jr.	3 receptions, 65 yards, TD

=== vs Houston ===
Houston Cougars (3–0) at Oregon State Beavers (0–4) – Game summary

Quarter	1	2	3	4	OT	Total
Cougars	0	10	0	14	3	27
Beavers	7	7	3	7	0	24

at Reser Stadium • Corvallis, Oregon

- Date: September 26
- Game time: 7:30 p.m.
- Game weather: Clear • Temperature: 65 °F (18 °C) • Wind: N at 6 mph (9.7 km/h)
- Game attendance: 29,338
- Referee: Cravonne Barrett
- TV announcers (ESPN): Anish Shroff, Andre Ware, and Paul Carcaterra

Game information

First quarter

- (8:12) ORST - Jake Reichle 1-yard run, Caleb Ojeda kick (Drive: 2 plays, 7 yards, 0:27; Oregon State 7-0)

Second quarter

- (13:43) ORST - Marquis Crosby 5-yard pass from Maalik Murphy, Caleb Ojeda kick (Drive: 11 plays, 70 yards, 6:20; Oregon State 14-0)
- (5:47) HOU - Ethan Sanchez 25-yard field goal (Drive: 21 plays, 85 yards, 7:47; Oregon State 14-3)
- (1:24) HOU - Conner Weigman 1-yard run, Ethan Sanchez kick (Drive: 7 plays, 55 yards, 1:48; Oregon State 14-10)

Third quarter

- (5:31) ORST - Caleb Ojeda 31-yard field goal (Drive: 7 plays, 48 yards, 3:39; Oregon State 17-10)

Fourth quarter

- (12:34) ORST - Cornell Hatcher Jr. 18-yard run, Cameron Smith kick (Drive: 12 plays, 80 yards, 6:54; Oregon State 24-10)
- (5:59) HOU - Stephon Johnson 27-yard pass from Conner Weigman, Ethan Sanchez kick (Drive: 8 plays, 76 yards, 2:18; Oregon State 24-17)
- (3:40) HOU - Tanner Koziol 50-yard pass from Conner Weigman, Ethan Sanchez kick (Drive: 4 plays, 64 yards, 0:51; Tied 24-24)

Overtime

HOU - Ethan Sanchez 24-yard field goal (Drive: 6 plays, 19 yards; Houston 27-24)

Statistics	HOU	ORST
First downs	17	22
Plays–yards	66–352	82–390
Rushes–yards	30–82	49–189
Passing yards	270	201
Passing: comp–att–int	20–36–1	20–33–0
Turnovers	1	0
Time of possession	24:37	35:23

Team	Category	Player	Statistics
Houston	Passing	Conner Weigman	20/36, 270 yards, 2 TD, INT
Houston	Rushing	Dean Connors	17 carries, 53 yards
Houston	Receiving	Amare Thomas	6 receptions, 104 yards
Oregon State	Passing	Maalik Murphy	20/33, 201 yards, TD
Oregon State	Rushing	Cornell Hatcher Jr.	17 carries, 93 yards, TD
Oregon State	Receiving	Trent Walker	7 receptions, 103 yards

=== at Appalachian State ===
Oregon State Beavers (0–5) at Appalachian State Mountaineers (2–2) – Game summary

Quarter	1	2	3	4	Total
Beavers	0	14	7	2	23
Mountaineers	17	0	10	0	27

at Kidd Brewer Stadium • Boone, North Carolina

- Date: October 4
- Game time: 12:30 p.m.
- Game weather: Cloudy • Temperature: 66 °F (19 °C) • Wind: 4 mph
- Game attendance: 35,021
- Referee: John Love
- TV announcers (ESPN+): David Jackson (play-by-play) and Avery Johnson (analyst)

Game information

First quarter

- (8:21) APP – Dominic De Freitas 49-yard field goal (Drive: 10 plays, 55 yards, 4:54; Appalachian State 3–0)
- (6:49) APP – JJ Kohl 6-yard run, Dominic De Freitas kick (Drive: 4 plays, 18 yards, 1:24; Appalachian State 10–0)
- (3:38) APP – Rashod Dubinion 2-yard run, Dominic De Freitas kick (Drive: 3 plays, 75 yards, 1:26; Appalachian State 17–0)

Second quarter

- (9:32) ORST – David Wells Jr. 30-yard run, Caleb Ojeda kick (Drive: 2 plays, 67 yards, 0:44; Appalachian State 17–7)
- (4:10) ORST – David Wells Jr. 3-yard pass from Maalik Murphy, Caleb Ojeda kick (Drive: 8 plays, 93 yards, 3:48; Appalachian State 17–14)

Third quarter

- (8:41) APP – Davion Dozier 28-yard pass from JJ Kohl, Dominic De Freitas kick (Drive: 13 plays, 76 yards, 6:13; Appalachian State 24–14)
- (5:03) ORST – Cornell Hatcher Jr. 15-yard pass from Maalik Murphy, Caleb Ojeda kick (Drive: 7 plays, 75 yards, 3:38; Appalachian State 24–21)
- (0:50) APP – Dominic De Freitas 45-yard field goal (Drive: 9 plays, 49 yards, 4:06; Appalachian State 27–21)

Fourth quarter

- (1:40) ORST – Team Safety (Drive: 2 plays, -6 yards, 0:09; Appalachian State 27–23)

Statistics	ORST	APP
First downs	27	18
Plays–yards	70–456	64–354
Rushes–yards	25–98	36–136
Passing yards	358	218
Passing: comp–att–int	30–45–2	13–28–0
Turnovers	3	0
Time of possession	31:22	28:38

Team	Category	Player	Statistics
Oregon State	Passing	Maalik Murphy	30/45, 358 yards, 2 TD, 2 INT
Oregon State	Rushing	Anthony Hankerson	19 carries, 64 yards
Oregon State	Receiving	Trent Walker	13 receptions, 179 yards
Appalachian State	Passing	JJ Kohl	13/28, 218 yards, TD
Appalachian State	Rushing	Rashod Dubinion	19 carries, 98 yards, TD
Appalachian State	Receiving	Davion Dozier	4 receptions, 140 yards, TD

=== vs Wake Forest ===
Wake Forest Demon Deacons (3–2) at Oregon State Beavers (0–6) – Game summary

Quarter	1	2	3	4	Total
Demon Deacons	15	10	7	7	39
Beavers	0	0	0	14	14

at Reser Stadium • Corvallis, Oregon

- Date: October 11
- Game time: 12:30 p.m.
- Game weather:
- Game attendance: 29,710
- Referee: Jerry Magallanes
- TV announcers (The CW): Ted Robinson (play-by-play), Ryan Leaf (analyst) and Nigel Burton (sideline)

Game information

First quarter

- WAKE – Chris Barnes 36-yard pass from Deshawn Purdie (Ty Clark III run), 13:32. Demon Deacons 8–0. Drive: 3 plays, 60 yards, 1:22.
- WAKE – Micah Mays Jr. 52-yard pass from Deshawn Purdie (Connor Calvert kick), 3:49. Demon Deacons 15–0. Drive: 2 plays, 52 yards, 0:49.

Second quarter

- WAKE – Chris Barnes 11-yard pass from Deshawn Purdie (Connor Calvert kick), 10:56. Demon Deacons 22–0. Drive: 4 plays, 29 yards, 1:50.
- WAKE – Connor Calvert 43-yard field goal, 0:00. Demon Deacons 25–0. Drive: 4 plays, 6 yards, 0:44.

Third quarter

- WAKE – Chris Barnes 55-yard pass from Deshawn Purdie (Connor Calvert kick), 6:33. Demon Deacons 32–0. Drive: 1 play, 55 yards, 0:08.

Fourth quarter

- ORST – Cornell Hatcher Jr. 29-yard run (Caleb Ojeda kick), 11:58. Demon Deacons 32–7. Drive: 7 plays, 43 yards, 2:53.
- WAKE – Demond Claiborne 66-yard run (Connor Calvert kick), 11:42. Demon Deacons 39–7. Drive: 1 play, 66 yards, 0:10.
- ORST – David Wells Jr. 4-yard pass from Gabarri Johnson (Caleb Ojeda kick), 4:10. Demon Deacons 39–14. Drive: 15 plays, 75 yards, 7:32.

Statistics	WAKE	ORST
First downs	17	22
Plays–yards	54–468	80–309
Rushes–yards	26–198	38–134
Passing yards	270	175
Passing: comp–att–int	14–28–0	19–42–0
Turnovers	0	2
Time of possession	24:48	35:12

Team	Category	Player	Statistics
Wake Forest	Passing	Deshawn Purdie	14/27, 270 yards, 4 TD
Wake Forest	Rushing	Demond Claiborne	16 carries, 144 yards, TD
Wake Forest	Receiving	Chris Barnes	3 receptions, 102 yards, 3 TD
Oregon State	Passing	Maalik Murphy	13/30, 130 yards, INT
Oregon State	Rushing	Anthony Hankerson	22 carries, 101 yards
Oregon State	Receiving	David Wells Jr.	6 receptions, 58 yards, TD

=== vs Lafayette (FCS) ===
Lafayette Leopards (FCS) (5–2) at Oregon State Beavers (0–7) – Game summary

Quarter	1	2	3	4	Total
Leopards (FCS)	3	10	0	0	13
Beavers	3	7	21	14	45

at Reser Stadium • Corvallis, Oregon

- Date: October 18
- Game time: 7:00 p.m.
- Game weather: Cloudy • Temperature: 60 °F (16 °C) • Wind: SW at 5 miles per hour (8.0 km/h)
- Game attendance: 27,735
- Referee: Chris Wiggins
- TV announcers (The CW): Ted Robinson (play-by-play), Ryan Leaf (analyst) and Nigel Burton (sideline)

Game information

First quarter

- LAF – Jack Simonetta 28-yard field goal, 5:42. Leopards 3–0. Drive: 14 plays, 76 yards, 6:55.
- ORST – Caleb Ojeda 40-yard field goal, 1:33. Tied 3–3. Drive: 9 plays, 40 yards, 4:02.

Second quarter

- ORST – Anthony Hankerson 1-yard run (Caleb Ojeda kick), 6:03. Beavers 10–3. Drive: 5 plays, 18 yards, 2:18.
- LAF – Matthew Scerbo 15-yard pass from Dean DeNobile (Jack Simonetta kick), 1:48. Tied 10–10. DrivE: 10 plays, 75 yards, 4:15.
- LAF – Jack Simonetta 37-yard field goal, 0:04. Leopards 13–10. Drive: 7 plays, 44 yards, 0:36.

Third quarter

- ORST– Gabe Milbourn 1-yard pass from Gabarri Johnson (Caleb Ojeda kick), 7:56. Beavers 17–13. Drive: 7 plays, 73 yards, 2:57.
- ORST – Gabarri Johnson 20-yard run (Caleb Ojeda kick), 3:38. Beavers 24–13. Drive: 4 plays, 81 yards, 1:57.
- ORST – Anthony Hankerson 15-yard run (Caleb Ojeda kick), 1:29. Beavers 31–13. Drive: 3 plays, 44 yards, 1:46.

Fourth quarter

- ORST – Anthony Hankerson 9-yard run (Caleb Ojeda kick), 9:00. Beavers 38–13. Drive: 7 plays, 78 yards, 3:12.
- ORST – Anthony Hankerson 65-yard run (Caleb Ojeda kick), 6:39. Beavers 45–13. Drive: 1 play, 65 yards, 0:12.

Statistics	LAF	ORST
First downs	17	23
Plays–yards	71–269	65–517
Rushes–yards	30–87	42–365
Passing yards	182	152
Passing: comp–att–int	19–41–1	17–23–1
Turnovers	1	2
Time of possession	30:09	29:51

Team	Category	Player	Statistics
Lafayette	Passing	Dean DeNobile	18/40, 176 yards, TD, INT
Lafayette	Rushing	Kente Edwards	13 carries, 41 yards
Lafayette	Receiving	Elijah Steward	4 receptions, 68 yards
Oregon State	Passing	Gabarri Johnson	7/9, 79 yards, TD, INT
Oregon State	Rushing	Anthony Hankerson	25 carries, 204 yards, 4 TD
Oregon State	Receiving	Gabe Milbourn	6 receptions, 48 yards, TD

=== vs Washington State ===
Washington State Cougars (4–4) at Oregon State Beavers (1–7) – Game summary

Quarter	1	2	3	4	Total
Cougars	0	7	0	0	7
Beavers	0	3	0	7	10

at Reser Stadium • Corvallis, Oregon

- Date: November 1
- Game time: 4:30 p.m.
- Game weather: Cloudy, 58 °F (14 °C)
- Game attendance: 32,905
- Referee: John Love
- TV announcers (CBS): Chris Lewis (play-by-play), Logan Ryan (analyst) and Brandon Baylor (sideline)

Game information

First quarter

- No scoring plays

Second quarter

- ORST – Caleb Ojeda 35-yard field goal, 2:52. Beavers 3–0. Drive: 8 plays, 39 yards, 3:44.
- WSU – Kirby Vorhees 3-yard run (Jack Stevens kick), 0:44. Cougars 7–3. Drive: 7 plays, 35 yards, 2:08.

Third quarter

- No scoring plays

Fourth quarter

- ORST – Anthony Hankerson 1-yard run (Caleb Ojeda kick), 9:52. Beavers 10–7. Drive: 4 plays, 64 yards, 1:44.

Statistics	WSU	ORST
First downs	16	15
Plays–yards	59–271	59–184
Rushes–yards	35–125	41–124
Passing yards	146	60
Passing: comp–att–int	13–24–2	12–18–0
Turnovers	2	0
Time of possession	28:48	31:12

Team	Category	Player	Statistics
Washington State	Passing	Zevi Eckhaus	13/24, 146 yards, 2 INT
Washington State	Rushing	Kirby Vorhees	10 carries, 46 yards, TD
Washington State	Receiving	Joshua Meredith	4 receptions, 44 yards
Oregon State	Passing	Gabarri Johnson	10/15, 33 yards
Oregon State	Rushing	Anthony Hankerson	25 carries, 132 yards, TD
Oregon State	Receiving	Taz Reddicks	2 receptions, 37 yards

=== vs Sam Houston ===
Sam Houston Bearkats (0–8) at Oregon State Beavers (2–7) – Game summary

Quarter	1	2	3	4	Total
Bearkats	0	7	7	7	21
Beavers	10	7	0	0	17

at Reser Stadium • Corvallis, Oregon

- Date: November 8
- Game time: 7:00 p.m.
- Game weather: Cloudy, 50 °F (10 °C)
- Game attendance: 31,626
- Referee: John Love
- TV announcers (The CW): Ted Robinson (play-by-play), Ryan Leaf (analyst) and Nigel Burton (sideline)

Game information

First quarter

- ORST – Anthony Hankerson 2-yard run (Caleb Ojeda kick), 11:55. Beavers 7–0. Drive: 6 plays, 71 yards, 2:59.
- ORST – Caleb Ojeda 33-yard field goal, 8:00. Beavers 10–0. Drive: 5 plays, 24 yards, 2:20.

Second quarter

- ORST – Anthony Hankerson 13-yard run (Caleb Ojeda kick), 6:53. Beavers 17–0. Drive: 11 plays, 80 yards, 6:33.
- SHSU – Chris Reed 35-yard pass from Mabrey Mettauer (Christian Pavon kick), 1:14. Beavers 17–7. Drive: 1 play, 35 yards, 0:06.

Third quarter

- SHSU – Tim Burns Jr. 98-yard kickoff return (Christian Pavon kick), 14:42. Beavers 17–14.

Fourth quarter

- SHSU – Brody Henderson 31-yard blocked punt return (Christian Pavon kick), 8:29. Bearkats 21–17.

Statistics	SHSU	ORST
First downs	8	28
Plays–yards	48–157	82–474
Rushes–yards	24–72	40–188
Passing yards	85	286
Passing: comp–att–int	9–24–1	29–42–2
Turnovers	1	3
Time of possession	21:47	38:13

Team	Category	Player	Statistics
Sam Houston	Passing	Mabrey Mattauer	4/10, 43 yards, TD
Sam Houston	Rushing	Mabrey Mattauer	3 carries, 29 yards
Sam Houston	Receiving	Chris Reed	3 receptions, 47 yards, TD
Oregon State	Passing	Gabarri Johnson	29/42, 286 yards, 2 INT
Oregon State	Rushing	Anthony Hankerson	33 carries, 166 yards, 2 TD
Oregon State	Receiving	David Wells Jr.	9 receptions, 112 yards

=== at Tulsa ===
Oregon State Beavers (2–8) at Tulsa Golden Hurricane (2–7) – Game summary

Quarter	1	2	3	4	Total
Beavers	0	0	0	14	14
Golden Hurricane	14	3	7	7	31

at Skelly Field at H. A. Chapman Stadium • Tulsa, Oklahoma

- Date: November 15
- Game time: 10:00 a.m.
- Game weather: Sunny • Temperature: 80 °F (27 °C)
- Game attendance: 15,034
- Referee: Chris Wiggins
- TV announcers (ESPN+): James Westling (play-by-play), Leger Douzable (analyst) and Madison Hock (sideline)

Game information

First quarter

- (11:36) TLSA – Dominic Richardson 24-yard run, Seth Morgan kick (Drive: 5 plays, 73 yards, 2:11; Tulsa 7–0)
- (8:14) TLSA – Brody Foley 6-yard pass from Baylor Hayes, Seth Morgan kick (Drive: 4 plays, 51 yards, 1:45; Tulsa 14–0)

Second quarter

- (5:33) TLSA – Seth Morgan 25-yard field goal (Drive: 6 plays, 43 yards, 2:37; Tulsa 17–0)

Third quarter

- (12:32) TLSA – Brody Foley 5-yard run, Seth Morgan kick (Drive: 6 plays, 75 yards, 2:28; Tulsa 24–0)

Fourth quarter

- (13:18) TLSA – Ajay Allen 31-yard run, Seth Morgan kick (Drive: 6 plays, 80 yards, 2:58; Tulsa 31–0)
- (8:49) ORST – Trent Walker 3-yard pass from Tristan Ti'a, pass failed (Drive: 8 plays, 75 yards, 4:29; Tulsa 31–6)
- (1:57) ORST – David Wells Jr. 4-yard pass from Tristan Ti'a, Tristan Ti'a pass (Drive: 10 plays, 86 yards, 2:44; Tulsa 31–14)

Statistics	ORST	TLSA
First downs	17	23
Plays–yards	71–310	68–446
Rushes–yards	35–69	49–283
Passing yards	241	163
Passing: comp–att–int	19–36–0	12–19–0
Turnovers	0	0
Time of possession	30:37	29:23

Team	Category	Player	Statistics
Oregon State	Passing	Tristan Ti'a	8/11, 141 yards, 2 TD
Oregon State	Rushing	Anthony Hankerson	19 carries, 46 yards
Oregon State	Receiving	Trent Walker	5 receptions, 117 yards, TD
Tulsa	Passing	Baylor Hayes	12/19, 163 yards, TD
Tulsa	Rushing	Dominic Richardson	27 carries, 166 yards, TD
Tulsa	Receiving	Brody Foley	7 receptions, 95 yards, TD

=== at Washington State ===
Oregon State Beavers (2–9) at Washington State Cougars (5–6) – Game summary

Quarter	1	2	3	4	Total
Beavers	0	0	0	8	8
Cougars	3	16	6	7	32

at Martin Stadium • Pullman, Washington

- Date: November 29
- Game time: 3:30 p.m.
- Game weather: Sunny
- Game attendance: 24,806
- Referee: Chris Wiggins
- TV announcers (The CW): Ted Robinson (play-by-play), Ryan Leaf (analyst) and Nigel Burton (sideline)

Game information

First quarter

- WSU - Jack Stevens 26-yard field goal, 9:26. Cougars 3-0, Drive. 12 plays, 70 yards, 5:29.

Second quarter

- WSU - Jack Stevens 44-yard field goal, 14:08. Cougars 6-0, Drive: 8 plays, 33 yards, 3:48.
- WSU - Kirby Vorhees 2-yard run (Jack Stevens kick), 11:54. Cougars 13-0, Drive: 3 plays, 26 yards, 1:12.
- WSU - Trey Leckner 1-yard pass from Zevi Eckhaus (Two-Point Run Conversion Failed), 1:34. Cougars 19-0, Drive: 4 plays, 45 yards, 1:01.

Third quarter

- WSU – Zevi Eckhaus 5-yard run (Jack Stevens kick), 4:51. Cougars 25-0, Drive: 4 plays, 29 yards, 2:15.

Fourth quarter

- ORST - Trent Walker 12-yard pass from Tristan Ti'a (Jake Reichle run for Two-Point Conversion), 5:49. Cougars 25-8, Drive: 4 plays, 70 yards, 1:48.
- WSU - Angel Johnson 2-yard run (Jack Stevens kick), 5:01. Cougars 32-8, Drive: 3 plays, 44 yards, 0:48.

Statistics	ORST	WSU
First downs	17	22
Plays–yards	80-280	64-383
Rushes–yards	29-40	34-186
Passing yards	240	197
Passing: comp–att–int	28-41-2	17-28-0
Turnovers	3	2
Time of possession	31:26	28:34

Team	Category	Player	Statistics
Oregon State	Passing	Tristan Ti'a	28/41, 240 yards, TD, 2 INT
Oregon State	Rushing	Anthony Hankerson	16 carries, 71 yards
Oregon State	Receiving	Trent Walker	7 receptions, 61 yards, TD
Washington State	Passing	Zevi Eckhaus	18/28, 197 yards, TD
Washington State	Rushing	Angel Johnson	4 carries, 64 yards, TD
Washington State	Receiving	Tony Freeman	7 receptions, 84 yards
