= Jesse Bobbit =

American football coach

Current position
- Title: Defensive coordinator
- Team: Iowa State
- Conference: Big 12

Playing career
- 2013–2016: South Dakota State
- Position: Linebacker

Coaching career (HC unless noted)
- 2017–2018: Bellevue West (NE) (assistant)
- 2019: South Dakota State (GA)
- 2020–2021: Washington State (GA)
- 2022: South Dakota State (S)
- 2023–2024: South Dakota State (DC)
- 2025: Washington State (IHC/DC/LB)
- 2026–present: Iowa State (DC)

Head coaching record
- Overall: 1–0
- Bowls: 1–0

Jesse Bobbit is an American college football coach. He is the defensive coordinator at Iowa State. He also coached for Bellevue West High School, South Dakota State, and Washington State. He played college football for South Dakota State as a linebacker.

== Playing career ==
Bobbit grew up in Palatine, Illinois and attended Palatine High School.

Bobbit played college football at South Dakota State and was a starter at linebacker for his final three seasons. He was named second-team all-Missouri Valley Football Conference as a senior after making 110 tackles.

== Coaching career ==
Bobbit began his coaching career in 2017 as an assistant at Bellevue West High School in Bellevue, Nebraska. After two years at Bellevue West he returned to South Dakota State as a graduate assistant. Bobbit spent one season on the Jackrabbits' staff before being hired in the same role at Washington State.

Bobbit was hired as the safeties coach at South Dakota State before the start of the 2022 season. He was promoted to defensive coordinator in 2023.

== Head coaching record ==
Year	Team	Overall	Conference	Standing	Bowl/playoffs
Washington State Cougars (Pac-12 Conference) (2025)
2025	Washington State	1–0			W Famous Idaho Potato
Washington State:		1–0			
Total:		1–0			
