= 2025 Wake Forest Demon Deacons football team =

American college football season

2025 Wake Forest Demon Deacons football

Duke's Mayo Bowl champion

Duke's Mayo Bowl, W 43–29 vs. Mississippi State
- Conference: Atlantic Coast Conference
- Record: 9–4 (4–4 ACC)
- Head coach: Jake Dickert (1st season)
- Offensive coordinator: Rob Ezell (1st season)
- Offensive scheme: Spread
- Defensive coordinator: Scottie Hazelton (1st season)
- Base defense: 4–2–5
- Home stadium: Allegacy Federal Credit Union Stadium

2025 Atlantic Coast Conference football standings
	Conf.			Overall
Team	W		L	W		L
No. 16 Virginia y	7	–	1	11	–	3
Duke y$	6	–	2	9	–	5
No. 2 Miami (FL) ^	6	–	2	13	–	3
Georgia Tech	6	–	2	9	–	4
SMU	6	–	2	9	–	4
Pittsburgh	6	–	2	8	–	5
Louisville	4	–	4	9	–	4
Wake Forest	4	–	4	9	–	4
NC State	4	–	4	8	–	5
California	4	–	4	7	–	6
Clemson	4	–	4	7	–	6
Stanford	3	–	5	4	–	8
Florida State	2	–	6	5	–	7
Virginia Tech	2	–	6	3	–	9
North Carolina	2	–	6	4	–	8
Boston College	1	–	7	2	–	10
Syracuse	1	–	7	3	–	9
Championship: Duke 27, Virginia 20^{OT}
^ – College Football Playoff participant; $ – Conference champion; y – Championship game participant; As of October 20, 2026; Rankings from AP Poll

The 2025 Wake Forest Demon Deacons football team represented Wake Forest University in the Atlantic Coast Conference (ACC) during the 2025 NCAA Division I FBS football season. The Demon Deacons were led by Jake Dickert in his first year as the head coach. The Demon Deacons played their home games at Allegacy Federal Credit Union Stadium located in Winston-Salem, North Carolina.

The Wake Forest Demon Deacons drew an average home attendance of 29,433.

== Offseason ==
=== Transfers ===
==== Outgoing ====
Player	Position	Destination
Horatio Fields	WR	Auburn
Walker Merrill	WR	Austin Peay
Ameir Glenn	DL	Ball State
Chris Marable	DL	Boston College
Andrew Hines III	LB	Bowling Green
Trishstin Glass	WR	Coastal Carolina
Antonio Robinson Jr.	CB	Florida Atlantic
Luke Petitbon	OL	Florida State
Jaydon Collins	OL	Furman
Nick Ragano	WR	Furman
Harry Lodge	TE	Georgia Tech
Jeremy Hecklinski	QB	Iowa
Jaydn Girard	WR	Lamar
Demarcus Rankin	DB	Lamar
Tyler Black	K	Liberty
Jamare Glasker	DB	Maryland
Jason Woods	WR	Mercyhurst
Matt Gulbin	OL	Michigan State
Keagen Trost	OL	Missouri
Bailey Benson	LB	NC State
Deuce Alexander	WR	Ole Miss
Luca Puccinelli	TE	Purdue
Tayshaun Burney	CB	Richmond
Eldrick Robinson II	LB	Robert Morris
Charlie Gilliam	QB	Samford
Nick Sharpe	OL	South Carolina
Sam Neely	CB	Stanford
Mitch Griffis	QB	Texas Tech
AJ Hasson	IOL	UC Davis
Donavon Greene	WR	Virginia Tech
Zach Vaughan	OL	Western Michigan
Busbee Phillips	CB	Unknown
Ryan Dupont	TE	Unknown
Kennedy Fauntleroy	RB	Unknown
Demond Claiborne	RB	Withdrawn
Jacob Dennison	OT	Withdrawn

==== Incoming ====
Player	Position	Previous school
Deshawn Purdie	QB	Charlotte
Sterling Berkhalter	WR	Cincinnati
Nuer Gatkuoth	DE	Colorado State
Gabe Kirschke	DL	Colorado State
JaMario Clements	RB	Duquesne
Brandon Smiley	DL	Elon
Harry Lodge	TE	Georgia Tech
Dallas Afalava	DL	Idaho
Ja'Marion Kennedy	IOL	Louisiana Tech
Sawyer Racanelli	WR	Montana
Ashaad Williams	CB	North Alabama
Karon Prunty	DB	North Carolina A&T
Jacob Dennison	OL	Ohio
Lardarius Webb Jr.	S	South Alabama
Robby Ashford	QB	South Carolina
Melvin Siani	OL	Temple
Karate Brenson	WR	Tennessee State
Langston Hardy	DE	UConn
Kamrean Johnson	TE	Vanderbilt
Braylon Johnson	CB	Virginia Tech
Reginald Vick Jr.	WR	Virginia Union
Fa'alili Fa'amoe	OL	Washington State
AJ Hasson	OL	Washington State
Chris Barnes	WR	Washington State
Jaylon Edmond	DB	Washington State
Carlos Hernandez	WR	Washington State
Devin Kylany	OL	Washington State
Frank Cusano	LB	Washington State
Rodrick Tialavea	OT	Washington State
Connor Calvert	K	Washington State
Jayden Loving	DL	Western Kentucky
Sascha Garcia	DB	William & Mary

== Schedule ==
Date	Time	Opponent	Site	TV	Result	Attendance
August 29, 2025	7:00 p.m.	Kennesaw State*	Allegacy Federal Credit Union Stadium; Winston-Salem, NC	ACCN	W 10–9	30,789
September 6	2:00 p.m.	Western Carolina*	Allegacy Federal Credit Union Stadium; Winston-Salem, NC	ACCNX/ESPN+	W 42–10	28,239
September 11	7:30 p.m.	NC State	Allegacy Federal Credit Union Stadium; Winston-Salem, NC (rivalry)	ESPN	L 24–34	29,043
September 27	12:00 p.m.	No. 16 Georgia Tech	Allegacy Federal Credit Union Stadium; Winston-Salem, NC	ESPN	L 29–30 ^{OT}	30,264
October 4	1:00 p.m.	at Virginia Tech	Lane Stadium; Blacksburg, VA	The CW	W 30–23	65,632
October 11	3:30 p.m.	at Oregon State*	Reser Stadium; Corvallis, OR	The CW	W 39–14	29,710
October 25	12:00 p.m.	SMU^{†}	Allegacy Federal Credit Union Stadium; Winston-Salem, NC	The CW	W 13–12	28,358
November 1	7:30 p.m.	at Florida State	Doak Campbell Stadium; Tallahassee, FL	ACCN	L 7–42	63,677
November 8	7:00 p.m.	at No. 14 Virginia	Scott Stadium; Charlottesville, VA	ESPN	W 16–9	55,568
November 15	4:30 p.m.	North Carolina	Allegacy Federal Credit Union Stadium; Winston-Salem, NC (rivalry)	The CW	W 28–12	32,390
November 22	12:00 p.m.	Delaware*	Allegacy Federal Credit Union Stadium; Winston-Salem, NC	ACCN	W 52–14	26,950
November 29	3:30 p.m.	at Duke	Wallace Wade Stadium; Durham, NC (rivalry)	ACCN	L 32–49	21,045
January 2, 2026	8:00 p.m.	vs. Mississippi State*	Bank of America Stadium; Charlotte, NC (Duke's Mayo Bowl)	ESPN	W 43–29	29,328
*Non-conference game; ^{†}Homecoming; Rankings from AP Poll (and CFP Rankings, after November 4) - Released prior to game; All times are in Eastern time

== Game summaries ==
=== vs Kennesaw State ===
Game One – Kennesaw State Owls (0–0) at Wake Forest Demon Deacons (0–0) – Game summary

Quarter	1	2	3	4	Total
Owls	6	0	3	0	9
Demon Deacons	7	0	3	0	10

at Allegacy Stadium • Winston-Salem, NC

- Date: Friday August 29, 2025
- Game time: 7:00 p.m. EDT
- Game weather: 81 °F (27 °C)
- Game attendance: 30,789
- Referee: Nate Black
- TV announcers (ACCN): Chuckie Kempf (play-by-play), Darius Walker (analyst), and Ashley Stroehlein (sideline)

Game information

First quarter

- (7:58) WAKE – Robby Ashford 5-yard run, Connor Calvert kick (Drive: 14 plays, 75 yards, 7:02; WAKE 7–0)
- (4:38) KENN – Coleman Bennett 19-yard run (Drive: 10 plays, 75 yards, 3:17; WAKE 7–6)

Second quarter

- No scoring plays.

Third quarter

- (9:45) KENN – Daniel Kinney 29-yard field goal (Drive: 14 plays, 64 yards, 5:15; KENN 9–7)
- (3:05) WAKE – Connor Calvert 22-yard field goal (Drive: 5 plays, 60 yards, 2:32; WAKE 10–9)

Fourth quarter

- No scoring plays.

Statistics	KENN	WAKE
First downs	18	20
Plays–yards	76–307	75–348
Rushes–yards	43–158	47–130
Passing yards	149	218
Passing: Comp–Att–Int	12–33–0	20–28–0
Turnovers	0	0
Time of possession	24:59	35:01

Team	Category	Player	Statistics
Kennesaw State	Passing	Dexter Williams II	12/33, 149 yards
Kennesaw State	Rushing	Coleman Bennett	17 carries, 66 yards, TD
Kennesaw State	Receiving	Gabriel Benyard	5 receptions, 103 yards
Wake Forest	Passing	Robby Ashford	20/28, 218 yards
Wake Forest	Rushing	Robby Ashford	18 carries, 42 yards, TD
Wake Forest	Receiving	Eni Falayi	4 receptions, 52 yards

=== vs Western Carolina (FCS) ===
Western Carolina Catamounts (FCS) (0–1) at Wake Forest Demon Deacons (1–0) – Game summary

Quarter	1	2	3	4	Total
Catamounts (FCS)	0	3	0	7	10
Demon Deacons	21	0	21	0	42

at Allegacy Federal Credit Union Stadium • Winston-Salem, North Carolina

- Date: September 6
- Game time: 2:00 p.m.
- Game weather:
- Game attendance: 28,239
- Referee: Garrett Dickerson
- TV announcers (ACCNX/ESPN+): Doug Sherman (play-by-play) and Reggie Walker (analyst)

Game information

First quarter

- WAKE – Robby Ashford 41-yard run (Connor Calvert kick), 5:57. Demon Deacons 7–0. Drive: 5 plays, 62 yards, 0:57.
- WAKE – Demond Claiborne 33-yard run (pass failed), 2:59. Demon Deacons 13–0. Drive: 2 plays, 73 yards, 0:42.
- WAKE – Demond Claiborne 27-yard run (pass failed), 2:47. Demon Deacons 19–0. Drive: 1 play, 27 yards, 0:05.
- WAKE Team Safety, 0:27. Demon Deacons 21–0.

Second quarter

- WCU – Christian Lowery 23-yard field goal, 5:46. Demon Deacons 21–3. Drive: 17 plays, 74 yards, 9:10.

Third quarter

- WAKE – Demond Claiborne 85-yard run (Connor Calvert kick), 12:29. Demon Deacons 28–3. Drive: 2 plays, 83 yards, 0:42.
- WAKE – Sterling Berkhalter 51-yard pass from Robby Ashford (Connor Calvert kick), 7:16. Demon Deacons 35–3. Drive: 2 plays, 93 yards, 0:37.
- WAKE – Jeremiah Melvin 27-yard pass from Deshawn Purdie (Connor Calvert kick), 1:52. Demon Deacons 42–3. Drive: 3 plays, 30 yards, 0:41.

Fourth quarter

- WCU – Markel Townsend 1-yard run (Marcus Trout kick), 6:49. Demon Deacons 42–10. Drive: 14 plays, 75 yards, 10:03.

Statistics	WCU	WAKE
First downs	17	21
Plays–yards	76–238	57–542
Rushes–yards	33–34	31–273
Passing yards	204	269
Passing: comp–att–int	26–43–1	16–26–1
Turnovers	2	3
Time of possession	35:58	24:02

Team	Category	Player	Statistics
Western Carolina	Passing	Bennett Judy	18/32, 155 yards, INT
Western Carolina	Rushing	Isaac Lee	5 carries, 40 yards
Western Carolina	Receiving	Malik Knight	5 receptions, 56 yards
Wake Forest	Passing	Robby Ashford	13/22, 227 yards, TD, INT
Wake Forest	Rushing	Demond Claiborne	10 carries, 193 yards, 3 TD
Wake Forest	Receiving	Chris Barnes	6 receptions, 149 yards

=== vs NC State (rivalry) ===
NC State Wolfpack (2–0) at Wake Forest Demon Deacons (2–0) – Game summary

Quarter	1	2	3	4	Total
Wolfpack	14	3	7	10	34
Demon Deacons	14	10	0	0	24

at Allegacy Federal Credit Union Stadium • Winston-Salem, North Carolina

- Date: September 11
- Game time: 7:30 p.m.
- Game weather: Clear, 73 °F (23 °C), SE 3mph
- Game attendance: 29,043
- Referee: Tim Hedgepeth
- TV announcers (ESPN): Matt Barrie (play-by-play), Tom Luginbill (analyst) and Harry Lyles Jr. (sideline)

Game information

First quarter

- WAKE – Chris Barnes 98-yard kickoff return (Connor Calvert kick), 14:48. Demon Deacons 7–0.
- WAKE – Demond Claiborne 1-yard run (Connor Calvert kick), 7:19. Demon Deacons 14–0. Drive: 7 plays, 93 yards, 2:47.
- NCSU – Justin Joly 5-yard pass from CJ Bailey (Kanoah Vinesett kick), 2:35. Demon Deacons 14–7. Drive: 8 plays, 75 yards, 4:44.
- NCSU – Isaiah Shirley 41-yard interception return (Kanoah Vinesett kick), 1:19. Tied 14–14.

Second quarter

- WAKE – Robby Ashford 1-yard run (Connor Calvert kick), 12:12. Demon Deacons 21–14. Drive: 9 plays, 75 yards, 4:07.
- WAKE – Connor Calvert 28-yard field goal, 4:07. Demon Deacons 24–14. Drive: 11 plays, 69 yards, 4:50.
- NCSU – Kanoah Vinesett 24-yard field goal, 1:00. Demon Deacons 24–17. Drive: 11 plays, 68 yards, 3:07.

Third quarter

- NCSU – Justin Joly 4-yard pass from CJ Bailey (Kanoah Vinesett kick), 6:22. Tied 24–24. Drive: 8 plays, 70 yards, 3:46.

Fourth quarter

- NCSU – Keenan Jackson 12-yard pass from CJ Bailey (Kanoah Vinesett kick), 12:37. Wolfpack 31–24. Drive: 5 plays, 70 yards, 2:54.
- NCSU – Kanoah Vinesett 38-yard field goal, 6:19. Wolfpack 34–24. Drive: 8 plays, 31 yards, 5:31.

Statistics	NCSU	WAKE
First downs	24	12
Plays–yards	76–406	57–311
Rushes–yards	44–205	22–59
Passing yards	32–201	35–252
Passing: comp–att–int	23–32–0	21–35–0
Turnovers	0	2
Time of possession	38:05	21:55

Team	Category	Player	Statistics
NC State	Passing	CJ Bailey	23/32, 201 yards, 3 TD
NC State	Rushing	Hollywood Smothers	24 carries, 164 yards
NC State	Receiving	Noah Rogers	4 receptions, 52 yards
Wake Forest	Passing	Robby Ashford	21/35, 252 yards, 2 INT
Wake Forest	Rushing	Demond Claiborne	12 carries, 35 yards, TD
Wake Forest	Receiving	Chris Barnes	3 receptions, 76 yards

=== vs No. 16 Georgia Tech ===
No. 16 Georgia Tech Yellow Jackets (4–0) at Wake Forest Demon Deacons (2–1) – Game summary

Quarter	1	2	3	4	OT	Total
No. 16 Yellow Jackets	3	0	14	6	7	30
Demon Deacons	0	17	3	3	6	29

at Allegacy Federal Credit Union Stadium • Winston-Salem, North Carolina

- Date: September 27
- Game time: 12:00 p.m.
- Game weather:
- Game attendance: 30,264
- Referee: Darryl DeBerry
- TV announcers (ESPN): Mike Monaco (play-by-play), Kirk Morrison (analyst), and Dawn Davenport (sideline)

Game information

First quarter

- GT – Aidan Birr 35-yard field goal, 8:09. Yellow Jackets 3–0. Drive: 7 plays, 22 yards, 2:34.

Second quarter

- WAKE – Robby Ashford 4-yard run (Connor Calvert kick), 10:46. Demon Deacons 7–3. Drive: 6 plays, 66 yards, 2:25.
- WAKE – Demond Claiborne 27-yard run (Connor Calvert kick), 5:53. Demon Deacons 14–3. Drive: 4 plays, 69 yards, 1:28.
- WAKE – Connor Calvert 24-yard field goal, 0:22. Demon Deacons 17–3. Drive: 9 plays, 83 yards, 2:49.

Third quarter

- WAKE – Connor Calvert 24-yard field goal, 10:33. Demon Deacons 20–3. Drive: 12 plays, 68 yards, 4:27.
- GT – Eric Rivers 14-yard pass from Haynes King (Aidan Birr kick), 5:39. Demon Deacons 20–10. Drive: 13 plays, 78 yards, 4:49.
- GT – Haynes King 5-yard run (Aidan Birr kick), 0:17. Demon Deacons 20–17. Drive: 10 plays, 65 yards, 3:58.

Fourth quarter

- GT – Aidan Birr 19-yard field goal, 9:45. Tied 20–20. Drive: 7 plays, 53 yards, 3:58.
- WAKE – Connor Calvert 29-yard field goal, 5:08. Demon Deacons 23–20. Drive: 6 plays, 11 yards, 1:41.
- GT – Aidan Birr 33-yard field goal, 0:02. Tied 23–23. Drive: 9 plays, 54 yards, 1:39.

Overtime

- GT – Haynes King 2-yard run (Aidan Birr kick). Yellow Jackets 30–23. Drive: 4 plays, 25 yards.
- WAKE – Demond Claiborne 25-yard run (pass failed). Yellow Jackets 30–29. Drive: 1 play, 25 yards.

Statistics	GT	WAKE
First downs	27	20
Plays–yards	85-411	71-445
Rushes–yards	42-163	39-212
Passing yards	248	233
Passing: comp–att–int	29-43-0	14-31-0
Turnovers	1	0
Time of possession	32:46	27:14

Team	Category	Player	Statistics
Georgia Tech	Passing	Haynes King	28/42, 243 yards, TD
Georgia Tech	Rushing	Haynes King	21 carries, 106 yards, 2 TD
Georgia Tech	Receiving	Eric Rivers	8 receptions, 77 yards, TD
Wake Forest	Passing	Robby Ashford	13/28, 219 yards
Wake Forest	Rushing	Demond Claiborne	21 carries, 119 yards, 2 TD
Wake Forest	Receiving	Micah Mays Jr.	2 receptions, 65 yards

=== at Virginia Tech ===
Wake Forest Demon Deacons (2–2) at Virginia Tech Hokies (2–3) – Game summary

Quarter	1	2	3	4	Total
Demon Deacons	3	21	3	3	30
Hokies	7	7	9	0	23

at Lane Stadium • Blacksburg, Virginia

- Date: October 4
- Game time: 1:00 p.m.
- Game weather: Sunny • Temperature: 70 °F (21 °C) • Wind: NE at 2 mph
- Game attendance: 65,632
- Referee: Riley Johnson
- TV announcers (The CW): Thom Brennaman (play-by-play), Will Blackmon (analyst), and Wes Bryant (sideline)

Game information

First quarter

- WF – Connor Calvert 33-yard field goal, 8:40. Demon Deacons 3–0. Drive: 4 plays, -3 yards, 1:47.
- VT – Marcellous Hawkins 3-yard run (John Love kick), 2:30. Hokies 7–3. Drive: 8 plays, 43 yards, 3:54.

Second quarter

- WF – Demond Claiborne 11-yard run (Connor Calvert kick), 13:01. Demon Deacons 10–7. Drive: 9 plays, 75 yards, 4:29.
- VT – Takye Heath 9-yard pass from Kyron Drones (John Love kick), 9:46. Hokies 14–10. Drive: 6 plays, 75 yards, 3:15.
- WF – Ty Clark III 3-yard run (Connor Calvert kick), 2:40. Demon Deacons 17–14. Drive: 7 plays, 55 yards, 2:07.
- WF – Eni Falayi 11-yard pass from Robby Ashford (Connor Calvert kick), 0:10. Demon Deacons 24–14. Drive: 7 plays, 44 yards, 1:29.

Third quarter

- VT – John Love 32-yard field goal, 10:24. Demon Deacons 24–17. Drive: 12 plays, 60 yards, 4:36.
- VT – John Love 38-yard field goal, 7:07. Demon Deacons 24–20. Drive: 5 plays, 32 yards, 2:25.
- WF – Connor Calvert 29-yard field goal, 4:41. Demon Deacons 27–20. Drive: 7 plays, 63 yards, 2:26.
- VT – John Love 34-yard field goal, 0:34. Demon Deacons 27–23. Drive: 4 plays, -13 yards, 1:19.

Fourth quarter

- WF – Connor Calvert 27-yard field goal, 2:14. Demon Deacons 30–23. Drive: 13 plays, 59 yards, 6:30.

Statistics	WAKE	VT
First downs	19	16
Plays–yards	72–347	63–263
Rushes–yards	32–91	35–152
Passing yards	256	111
Passing: comp–att–int	24–40–1	14–28–1
Turnovers	1	1
Time of possession	32:40	27:20

Team	Category	Player	Statistics
Wake Forest	Passing	Robby Ashford	24/39, 256 yards, TD, INT
Wake Forest	Rushing	Demond Claiborne	7 carries, 29 yards, TD
Wake Forest	Receiving	Sawyer Racanelli	3 receptions, 88 yards
Virginia Tech	Passing	Kyron Drones	14/28, 111 yards, TD, INT
Virginia Tech	Rushing	Terion Stewart	9 carries, 62 yards
Virginia Tech	Receiving	Donavon Greene	4 receptions, 52 yards

=== at Oregon State ===
Wake Forest Demon Deacons (3–2) at Oregon State Beavers (0–6) – Game summary

Quarter	1	2	3	4	Total
Demon Deacons	15	10	7	7	39
Beavers	0	0	0	14	14

at Reser Stadium • Corvallis, Oregon

- Date: October 11
- Game time: 3:30 p.m.
- Game weather:
- Game attendance: 29,710
- Referee: Jerry Magallanes
- TV announcers (The CW): Ted Robinson (play-by-play), Ryan Leaf (analyst) and Nigel Burton (sideline)

Game information

First quarter

- WAKE – Chris Barnes 36-yard pass from Deshawn Purdie (Ty Clark III run), 13:32. Demon Deacons 8–0. Drive: 3 plays, 60 yards, 1:22.
- WAKE – Micah Mays Jr. 52-yard pass from Deshawn Purdie (Connor Calvert kick), 3:49. Demon Deacons 15–0. Drive: 2 plays, 52 yards, 0:49.

Second quarter

- WAKE – Chris Barnes 11-yard pass from Deshawn Purdie (Connor Calvert kick), 10:56. Demon Deacons 22–0. Drive: 4 plays, 29 yards, 1:50.
- WAKE – Connor Calvert 43-yard field goal, 0:00. Demon Deacons 25–0. Drive: 4 plays, 6 yards, 0:44.

Third quarter

- WAKE – Chris Barnes 55-yard pass from Deshawn Purdie (Connor Calvert kick), 6:33. Demon Deacons 32–0. Drive: 1 play, 55 yards, 0:08.

Fourth quarter

- ORST – Cornell Hatcher Jr. 29-yard run (Caleb Ojeda kick), 11:58. Demon Deacons 32–7. Drive: 7 plays, 43 yards, 2:53.
- WAKE – Demond Claiborne 66-yard run (Connor Calvert kick), 11:42. Demon Deacons 39–7. Drive: 1 play, 66 yards, 0:10.
- ORST – David Wells Jr. 4-yard pass from Gabarri Johnson (Caleb Ojeda kick), 4:10. Demon Deacons 39–14. Drive: 15 plays, 75 yards, 7:32.

Statistics	WAKE	ORST
First downs	17	22
Plays–yards	54–468	80–309
Rushes–yards	26–198	38–134
Passing yards	270	175
Passing: comp–att–int	14–28–0	19–42–0
Turnovers	0	2
Time of possession	24:48	35:12

Team	Category	Player	Statistics
Wake Forest	Passing	Deshawn Purdie	14/27, 270 yards, 4 TD
Wake Forest	Rushing	Demond Claiborne	16 carries, 144 yards, TD
Wake Forest	Receiving	Chris Barnes	3 receptions, 102 yards, 3 TD
Oregon State	Passing	Maalik Murphy	13/30, 130 yards, INT
Oregon State	Rushing	Anthony Hankerson	22 carries, 101 yards
Oregon State	Receiving	David Wells Jr.	6 receptions, 58 yards, TD

=== vs SMU ===
SMU Mustangs (5–2) at Wake Forest Demon Deacons (4–2) – Game summary

Quarter	1	2	3	4	Total
Mustangs	0	6	6	0	12
Demon Deacons	3	7	0	3	13

at Allegacy Federal Credit Union Stadium • Winston-Salem, North Carolina

- Date: October 25
- Game time: 12:00 p.m.
- Game weather: Temperature: 58 °F (14 °C) • Wind: NE @ 4 mph • Weather: Sunny
- Game attendance: 28,358
- Referee: Justin Elliott
- TV announcers (The CW): Thom Brennaman (play-by-play), Will Blackmon (analyst) and Wes Bryant (sideline)

Game information

First quarter

- (4:59) WAKE – Connor Calvert 25-yard field goal (Drive: 7 plays, 12 yards, 3:12; Wake Forest 3–0)

Second quarter

- (11:53) SMU – Sam Keltner 36-yard field goal (Drive: 12 plays, 52 yards, 4:51; Tied 3–3)
- (10:09) WAKE – Eni Falayi 12-yard pass from Robby Ashford, Connor Calvert kick (Drive: 2 plays, 14 yards, 0:41; Wake Forest 10–3)
- (3:53) SMU – Sam Keltner 35-yard field goal (Drive: 8 plays, 69 yards, 2:49; Wake Forest 10–6)

Third quarter

- (2:58) SMU – Shaadie Clayton-Johnson 6-yard run, Sam Keltner PAT blocked (Drive: 6 plays, 41 yards, 2:54; SMU 12–10)

Fourth quarter

- (0:00) WAKE – Connor Calvert 50-yard field goal (Drive: 3 plays, 25 yards, 0:12; Wake Forest 13–12)

Statistics	SMU	WAKE
First downs	8	17
Plays–yards	67–246	72–301
Rushes–yards	28–75	35–85
Passing yards	171	216
Passing: comp–att–int	21–39–1	18–37–2
Turnovers	3	5
Time of possession	27:38	32:22

Team	Category	Player	Statistics
SMU	Passing	Kevin Jennings	21/39, 171 yards, INT
SMU	Rushing	Chris Johnson Jr.	8 carries, 29 yards
SMU	Receiving	RJ Maryland	2 receptions, 51 yards
Wake Forest	Passing	Deshawn Purdie	14/26, 183 yards, 2 INT
Wake Forest	Rushing	Demond Claiborne	23 carries, 73 yards
Wake Forest	Receiving	Chris Barnes	5 receptions, 66 yards

=== at Florida State ===
Wake Forest Demon Deacons (5–2) at Florida State Seminoles (3–4) – Game summary

Quarter	1	2	3	4	Total
Demon Deacons	0	0	0	7	7
Seminoles	0	14	14	14	42

at Doak Campbell Stadium • Tallahassee, Florida

- Date: November 1
- Game time: 7:30 p.m.
- Game weather: Clear • Temperature: 63 °F (17 °C) • Wind: SE at 3 mph
- Game attendance: 63,677
- Referee: Riley Johnson
- TV announcers (ACCN): Jorge Sedano (play-by-play), Rodney McLeod (analyst), and Victoria Arlen (sideline reporter)
- Box score, Recap

Game information

First quarter

- No scoring plays.

Second quarter

- FSU - Tommy Castellanos 6-yard run (Jake Weinberg kick), 13:44. Seminoles 7–0. Drive: 6 plays, 80 yards, 3:05.
- FSU – Samuel Singleton Jr. 10-yard run (Jake Weinberg kick), 0:57. Seminoles 14–0. Drive: 7 plays, 72 yards, 2:29.

Third quarter

- FSU – Gavin Sawchuk 1-yard run (Jake Weinberg kick), 4:59. Seminoles 21–0. Drive: 7 plays, 47 yards, 3:25.
- FSU – Gavin Sawchuk 1-yard run (Jake Weinberg kick), 1:45. Seminoles 28–0. Drive: 2 plays, 40 yards, 0:24.

Fourth quarter

- FSU – Randy Pittman Jr. 7-yard run (Jake Weinberg kick), 14:54. Seminoles 35–0. Drive: 4 plays, 20 yards, 1:05.
- FSU – Duce Robinson 11-yard pass from Tommy Castellanos (Jake Weinberg kick), 11:51. Seminoles 42–0. Drive: 4 plays, 78 yards, 1:44.
- WAKE – Micah Mays Jr. 6-yard pass from Deshawn Purdie (Connor Calvert kick), 6:49. Seminoles 42–7. Drive: 4 plays, 19 yards, 2:01.

Statistics	WAKE	FSU
First downs	19	18
Plays–yards	71–247	57–421
Rushes–yards	40–85	40–150
Passing yards	162	271
Passing: comp–att–int	18–31–1	12–17–0
Turnovers	2	1
Time of possession	34:24	25:36

Team	Category	Player	Statistics
Wake Forest	Passing	Robby Ashford	12/21, 93 yards, INT
Wake Forest	Rushing	Robby Ashford	12 carries, 59 yards
Wake Forest	Receiving	Micah Mays Jr.	5 receptions, 51 yards, TD
Florida State	Passing	Tommy Castellanos	12/16, 271 yards, TD
Florida State	Rushing	Samuel Singleton Jr.	14 carries, 91 yards, TD
Florida State	Receiving	Duce Robinson	5 receptions, 148 yards, TD

=== at No. 14 Virginia ===
Wake Forest Demon Deacons (5–3) at No. 14 Virginia Cavaliers (8–1) – Game summary

Quarter	1	2	3	4	Total
Demon Deacons	0	10	3	3	16
No. 14 Cavaliers	3	3	3	0	9

at Scott Stadium • Charlottesville, Virginia

- Date: November 8
- Game time: 7:00 p.m. EST
- Game weather:
- Game attendance: 55,568
- Referee: Nate Black
- TV announcers (ESPN): Mark Jones (play-by-play), Roddy Jones (analyst), and Quint Kessenich (sideline)

Game information

First quarter

- UVA – Will Bettridge 34-yard field goal, 11:48. Cavaliers 3–0. Drive: 4 plays, 7 yards, 1:18.

Second quarter

- UVA – Will Bettridge 21-yard field goal, 4:27. Cavaliers 6–0. Drive: 9 plays, 91 yards, 4:46.
- WAKE – Carlos Hernandez 88-yard punt return (Connor Calvert kick), 1:33. Demon Deacons 7–6.
- WAKE – Connor Calvert 39-yard field goal, 0:40. Demon Deacons 10–6. Drive: 4 plays, 9 yards, 0:27.

Third quarter

- UVA – Will Bettridge 40-yard field goal, 10:35. Demon Deacons 10–9. Drive: 9 plays, 58 yards, 4:20.
- WAKE – Connor Calvert 50-yard field goal, 3:49. Demon Deacons 13–9. Drive: 6 plays, 16 yards, 1:53.

Fourth quarter

- WAKE – Connor Calvert 49-yard field goal, 3:53. Demon Deacons 16–9. Drive: 16 plays, 48 yards, 9:16.

Statistics	WAKE	UVA
First downs	12	13
Plays–yards	64–203	64–327
Rushes–yards	41–139	30–163
Passing yards	64	164
Passing: comp–att–int	9–23–0	21–34–0
Turnovers	0	3
Time of possession	31:42	28:18

Team	Category	Player	Statistics
Wake Forest	Passing	Robby Ashford	7/16, 46 yards
Wake Forest	Rushing	Demond Claiborne	25 carries, 75 yards
Wake Forest	Receiving	Ty Clark	1 catch, 22 yards
Virginia	Passing	Daniel Kaelin	18/28, 145 yards
Virginia	Rushing	J'Mari Taylor	19 carries, 98 yards
Virginia	Receiving	Trell Harris	6 catches, 60 yards

=== vs North Carolina (rivalry) ===
North Carolina Tar Heels (4–5) at Wake Forest Demon Deacons (6–3) – Game summary

Quarter	1	2	3	4	Total
Tar Heels	0	6	3	3	12
Demon Deacons	7	7	7	7	28

at Allegacy Federal Credit Union Stadium • Winston-Salem, North Carolina

- Date: November 15
- Game time: 4:30 p.m. EST
- Game weather:
- Game attendance: 32,390
- Referee: Darryl DeBerry
- TV announcers (The CW): Thom Brennaman (play-by-play), Will Blackmon (analyst) and Wes Bryant (sideline)

Game information

First quarter

- WAKE – Carlos Hernandez 51-yard run (Connor Calvert kick), 13:11. Demon Deacons 7–0. Drive: 5 plays, 75 yards, 1:49.

Second quarter

- UNC – Rece Verhoff 40-yard field goal, 12:54. Demon Deacons 7–3. Drive: 13 plays, 58 yards, 7:37.
- WAKE – Demond Claiborne 12-yard run (Connor Calvert kick), 1:47. Demon Deacons 14–3. Drive: 13 plays, 67 yards, 5:40.
- UNC – Rece Verhoff 57-yard field goal, 0:00. Demon Deacons 14–6. Drive: 6 plays, 23 yards, 1:47.

Third quarter

- UNC – Rece Verhoff 42-yard field goal, 6:46. Demon Deacons 14–9. Drive: 6 plays, 43 yards, 2:43.
- WAKE – Carlos Hernandez 70-yard pass from Robby Ashford (Connor Calvert kick), 5:54. Demon Deacons 21–9. Drive: 2 plays, 75 yards, 0:52.

Fourth quarter

- UNC – Rece Verhoff 47-yard field goal, 11:03. Demon Deacons 21–12. Drive: 6 plays, 41 yards, 1:49.
- WAKE – Robby Ashford 2-yard run (Connor Calvert kick), 0:22. Demon Deacons 28–12. Drive: 10 plays, 55 yards, 4:59.

Statistics	UNC	WAKE
First downs	16	19
Plays–yards	61–257	64–414
Rushes–yards	24–56	39–223
Passing yards	201	191
Passing: comp–att–int	21–37–0	15–25–0
Turnovers	0	1
Time of possession	30:02	29:58

Team	Category	Player	Statistics
North Carolina	Passing	Gio Lopez	21/36, 201 yards
North Carolina	Rushing	Demon June	9 carries, 32 yards
North Carolina	Receiving	Jake Johnson	5 receptions, 54 yards
Wake Forest	Passing	Robby Ashford	15/25, 191 yards, TD
Wake Forest	Rushing	Demond Claiborne	23 carries, 98 yards, TD
Wake Forest	Receiving	Carlos Hernandez	6 receptions, 100 yards, TD

=== vs Delaware ===
Delaware Fightin' Blue Hens (5-5) at Wake Forest Demon Deacons (7-3) – Game summary

Quarter	1	2	3	4	Total
Fightin' Blue Hens	0	7	0	7	14
Demon Deacons	15	20	14	3	52

at Allegacy Federal Credit Union Stadium • Winston-Salem, North Carolina

- Date: November 22
- Game time: 12:00 p.m.
- Game weather: Sunny, 68 °F (20 °C)
- Game attendance: 26,950
- Referee: Jon Noli
- TV announcers (ACCN): Jorge Sedano (play-by-play), Rodney McLeod (analyst) and Victoria Arlen (sideline)

Game information

First quarter

- WF – Demond Claiborne 1-yard run (Connor Calvert kick), 7:08. Demon Deacons 7–0. Drive: 15 plays, 76 yards, 5:58.
- WF – Ty Clark III 13-yard run (Sawyer Racanelli run), 2:13. Demon Deacons 15–0. Drive: 9 plays, 59 yards, 3:29.

Second quarter

- DEL – Viron Ellison Jr. 43-yard pass from Nick Minicucci (Nate Reed kick), 12:47. Demon Deacons 15–7. Drive: 10 plays, 75 yards, 4:26.
- WF – Connor Calvert 44-yard field goal, 9:40. Demon Deacons 18–7. Drive: 7 plays, 48 yards, 3:07.
- WF – Robby Ashford 4-yard run (Connor Calvert kick), 4:39. Demon Deacons 25–7. Drive: 4 plays, 88 yards, 1:25.
- WF – Connor Calvert 44-yard field goal, 2:15. Demon Deacons 28–7. Drive: 5 plays, -8 yards, 2:19.
- WF – Carlos Hernandez 79-yard pass from Robby Ashford (Matthew Dennis kick), 0:19. Demon Deacons 35–7. Drive: 1 play, 79 yards, 0:10.

Third quarter

- WF – Sterling Berkhalter 19-yard pass from Robby Ashford (Matthew Dennis kick), 10:08. Demon Deacons 42–7. Drive: 8 plays, 80 yards, 4:49.
- WF – Carlos Hernandez 93-yard pass from Robby Ashford (Matthew Dennis kick), 3:37. Demon Deacons 49–7. Drive: 2 plays, 92 yards, 0:44.

Fourth quarter

- WF – Connor Calvert 47-yard field goal, 8:44. Demon Deacons 52–7. Drive: 8 plays, 33 yards, 3:10.
- DEL – Max Patterson 25-yard pass from Braden Streeter (Nate Reed kick), 1:59. Demon Deacons 52–14. Drive: 13 plays, 82 yards, 6:41.

Statistics	DEL	WAKE
First downs	19	21
Plays–yards	76–300	60–577
Rushes–yards	29–67	34–263
Passing yards	233	314
Passing: comp–att–int	32–47–0	16–26–2
Turnovers	2	2
Time of possession	33:03	26:57

Team	Category	Player	Statistics
Delaware	Passing	Nick Minicucci	21/30, 140 yards, TD
Delaware	Rushing	Viron Ellison Jr.	9 carries, 34 yards
Delaware	Receiving	Viron Ellison Jr.	7 receptions, 60 yards, TD
Wake Forest	Passing	Robby Ashford	15/22, 292 yards, 3 TD, INT
Wake Forest	Rushing	Chris Barnes	1 carry, 78 yards
Wake Forest	Receiving	Carlos Hernandez	5 receptions, 197 yards, 2 TD

=== at Duke (rivalry) ===
Wake Forest Demon Deacons (8–3) at Duke Blue Devils (6–5) – Game summary

Quarter	1	2	3	4	Total
Demon Deacons	3	14	8	7	32
Blue Devils	14	7	14	14	49

at Wallace Wade Stadium • Durham, North Carolina

- Date: November 29
- Game time: 3:30 p.m.
- Game weather: Sunny, 42 °F (6 °C)
- Game attendance: 21,045
- Referee: Nolan Dumas
- TV announcers (ACCN): Wes Durham (play-by-play), Steve Addazio (analyst) and Dana Boyle (sideline)

Game information

First quarter

- DUKE – Nate Sheppard 5-yard run (Todd Pelino kick), 10:36. Blue Devils 7–0. Drive: 8 plays, 75 yards, 4:24.
- WAKE – Connor Calvert 42-yard field goal, 5:59. Blue Devils 7–3. Drive: 10 plays, 46 yards, 4:31.
- DUKE – Darian Mensah 4-yard run (Todd Pelino kick), 0:00. Blue Devils 14–3. Drive: 10 plays, 75 yards, 5:59.

Second quarter

- WAKE – Sawyer Racanelli 22-yard pass from Robby Ashford (Connor Calvert kick), 11:56. Blue Devils 14–10. Drive: 10 plays, 75 yards, 3:04.
- DUKE – Anderson Castle 1-yard run (Todd Pelino kick), 1:38. Blue Devils 21–10. Drive: 7 plays, 34 yards, 2:24.
- WAKE – Karate Benson 20-yard pass from Robby Ashford (Connor Calvert kick), 0:29. Blue Devils 21–17. Drive: 8 plays, 75 yards, 1:09.

Third quarter

- DUKE – Sahmir Hagans 30-yard pass from Darian Mensah (Todd Pelino kick), 9:45. Blue Devils 28–17. Drive: 2 plays, 35 yards, 0:31.
- DUKE – Anderson Castle 2-yard run (Todd Pelino kick), 3:51. Blue Devils 35–17. Drive: 8 plays, 66 yards, 4:15.
- WAKE – Robby Ashford 10-yard run (Robby Ashford run), 0:00. Blue Devils 35–25. Drive: 9 plays, 75 yards, 3:52.

Fourth quarter

- DUKE – Nate Sheppard 13-yard run (Todd Pelino kick), 13:57. Blue Devils 42–25. Drive: 2 plays, 13 yards, 1:01.
- WAKE – Ty Clark III 1-yard run (Connor Calvert kick), 11:13. Blue Devils 42–32. Drive: 10 plays, 83 yards, 2:41.
- DUKE – Jeremiah Hasley 11-yard pass from Darian Mensah (Todd Pelino kick), 0:23. Blue Devils 49–32. Drive: 4 plays, 11 yards, 1:39.

Statistics	WAKE	DUKE
First downs	27	24
Plays–yards	75–468	74–378
Rushes–yards	32–126	39–110
Passing yards	342	268
Passing: comp–att–int	27–43–1	24–35–0
Turnovers	4	0
Time of possession	25:21	34:39

Team	Category	Player	Statistics
Wake Forest	Passing	Robby Ashford	27/43, 342 yards, 2 TD, INT
Wake Forest	Rushing	Demond Claiborne	13 carries, 58 yards
Wake Forest	Receiving	Sawyer Racanelli	7 receptions, 123 yards, TD
Duke	Passing	Darian Mensah	24/35, 268 yards, 2 TD
Duke	Rushing	Nate Sheppard	23 carries, 75 yards, 2 TD
Duke	Receiving	Cooper Barkate	8 receptions, 83 yards

=== vs. Mississippi State (Duke's Mayo Bowl) ===
2026 Duke's Mayo Bowl
Wake Forest Demon Deacons (8–4) vs Mississippi State Bulldogs (5–7) – Game summary

Quarter	1	2	3	4	Total
Demon Deacons	15	0	15	13	43
Bulldogs	6	3	11	9	29

at Bank of America Stadium • Charlotte, NC

- Date: January 2, 2026
- Game time: 8:00 p.m. EST
- Game weather: Cloudy • Temperature: 57 °F (14 °C) • Wind: 6 mph (9.7 km/h) northeast
- Game attendance: 29,328
- Referee: Gregory Blum
- TV announcers (ESPN): Anish Shroff (play-by-play), Andre Ware (analyst) and Paul Carcaterra (sideline)

Game information

First quarter

- MSST – Kyle Ferrie 33-yard field goal, 12:55. Bulldogs 3–0. Drive: 7 plays, 60 yards, 2:05.
- WAKE – Kordell Bartley 100-yard kickoff return (Sawyer Racanelli-Eni Falayi pass), 12:33. Demon Deacons 8–3.
- MSST – Kyle Ferrie 50-yard field goal, 7:12. Demon Deacons 8–6. Drive: 6 plays, 42 yards, 2:00.
- WAKE – Kamrean Johnson 14-yard pass from Robby Ashford (Connor Calvert kick), 3:49. Demon Deacons 15–6. Drive: 9 plays, 75 yards, 3:23.

Second quarter

- MSST – Kyle Ferrie 23-yard field goal, 6:15. Demon Deacons 15–9. Drive: 10 plays, 56 yards, 5:11.

Third quarter

- WAKE – Jack Foley 64-yard pass from Robby Ashford (Robby Ashford run), 14:06. Demon Deacons 23–9. Drive: 3 plays, 75 yards, 0:54.
- MSST – Kyle Ferrie 36-yard field goal, 9:24. Demon Deacons 23–12. Drive: 5 plays, 15 yards, 2:07.
- WAKE – Robby Ashford 2-yard run (Connor Calvert kick), 4:19. Demon Deacons 30–12. Drive: 11 plays, 75 yards, 5:05.
- MSST – Kamario Taylor 1-yard run (Kamario Taylor–Seydou Traore pass), 0:00. Demon Deacons 30–20. Drive: 8 plays, 65 yards, 4:19.

Fourth quarter

- MSST – Sanfrisco Magee 42-yard pass from Kamario Taylor (Kyle Ferrie kick), 10:17. Demon Deacons 30–27. Drive: 4 plays, 84 yards, 1:09.
- WAKE – Robby Ashford 1-yard run (Connor Calvert kick BLOCKED), 4:07. Demon Deacons 36–27. Drive: 10 plays, 63 yards, 6:03.
- MSST – Kelley Jones defensive PAT conversion, 4:07. Demon Deacons 36–29.
- WAKE – Ty Clark III 62-yard pass from Robby Ashford (Connor Calvert kick), 2:15. Demon Deacons 43–29. Drive: 3 plays, 65 yards, 0:20.

Statistics	WF	MSST
First downs	23	20
Plays–yards	68–451	69–408
Rushes–yards	35–148	42–114
Passing yards	303	294
Passing: Comp–Att–Int	20–33–1	16–27–0
Turnovers	1	0
Time of possession	31:35	28:25

Team	Category	Player	Statistics
Wake Forest	Passing	Robby Ashford	20/33, 303 yards, 3 TD, INT
Wake Forest	Rushing	Ty Clark III	17 carries, 91 yards
Wake Forest	Receiving	Carlos Hernandez	6 receptions, 73 yards
Mississippi State	Passing	Kamario Taylor	13/22, 241 yards, TD
Mississippi State	Rushing	Kamario Taylor	18 carries, 63 yards, TD
Mississippi State	Receiving	Brenen Thompson	4 receptions, 106 yards
