= Trent Walker (American football) =

American football player

No. 4 – Houston Cougars
- Position: Wide receiver
- Class: Redshirt Senior

Personal information
- Listed height: 6 ft 2 in (1.88 m)
- Listed weight: 195 lb (88 kg)

Career information
- High school: Beaverton (Beaverton, Oregon)
- College: Oregon State (2021–2025); Houston (2026–present)
- Stats at ESPN

Trent Walker is an American college football wide receiver for the Houston Cougars. He previously played for the Oregon State Beavers.

== Early life ==
Walker attended Beaverton High School in Beaverton, Oregon. He committed to play college football for the Oregon State Beavers, joining the team as a walk-on.

== College career ==
=== Oregon State ===
During Walker's two first collegiate seasons in 2021 and 2022, he would redshirt, while appearing in only three games with no statistics. In 2023, he appeared in 11 games for the Beavers, where he hauled in five receptions for 66 yards. In week 2 of the 2024 season, Walker brought in eight receptions for 92 yards in a 21-0 win over San Diego State. In a week 3 loss to Oregon, he notched eight receptions for 68 yards for the Beavers. In week 8, Walker posted a career-high nine receptions for 88 yards versus UNLV.

On December 30, 2025, Walker announced that he would enter the transfer portal.

=== Houston ===
On January 7, 2026, Walker announced that he would transfer to Houston.

=== Statistics ===
Season	Team	Games		Receiving			
Season	Team	GP	GS	Rec	Yds	Avg	TD
2021	Oregon State	1	0	Redshirted (redshirt)			
2022	Oregon State	2	0	Medical redshirt			
2023	Oregon State	11	0	5	66	13.2	0
2024	Oregon State	12	11	81	901	11.1	2
2025	Oregon State	12	12	68	823	12.1	2
2026	Houston	11	11	38	515	13.6	3
Career		49	34	192	2,305	12.0	7
