= Anthony Hankerson =

American football player (born 2004)

Profile
- Position: Running back

Personal information
- Born: February 3, 2004 (age 22); Boynton Beach, Florida, U.S.
- Listed height: 5 ft 8 in (1.73 m)
- Listed weight: 204 lb (93 kg)

Career information
- High school: St. Thomas Aquinas (Fort Lauderdale, Florida)
- College: Colorado (2022–2023); Oregon State (2024–2025)
- NFL draft: 2026: undrafted

Career history
- Miami Dolphins (2026)*; Seattle Seahawks (2026)*
- * Offseason or practice squad member only

Awards and highlights
- Pac-12 Offensive Top Performer (2025)
- Stats at Pro Football Reference

Anthony Hankerson (born February 3, 2004) is an American professional football running back. He played college football for the Colorado Buffaloes and Oregon State Beavers.

== Early life ==
Hankerson attended St. Thomas Aquinas High School in Fort Lauderdale, Florida, where he rushed for 3,420 yards and 43 touchdowns and helped the team to three Class 7A state titles. He was rated as a three-star recruit and committed to play college football for the Colorado Buffaloes.

== College career ==
=== Colorado ===
As a freshman in 2022, Hankerson rushed for 274 yards and three touchdowns on 68 carries in eight games. In 2023, he rushed 78 times for 319 yards and a touchdown. After the season, Hankerson entered his name into the NCAA transfer portal.

=== Oregon State ===
Hankerson transferred to play for the Oregon State Beavers. During the 2024 season, Hankerson ran for 1,082 yards and 15 touchdowns on 232 carries. In week 11 of the 2025 season, he rushed for 132 yards and a touchdown in an upset win over Washington State.

== Professional career ==
Pre-draft measurables
Height	Weight	Arm length	Hand span	Wingspan	40-yard dash	10-yard split	20-yard split	20-yard shuttle	Three-cone drill	Vertical jump	Broad jump	Bench press
5 ft 7 5/8 in (1.72 m)	204 lb (93 kg)	29 1/8 in (0.74 m)	9 3/8 in (0.24 m)	6 ft 1 in (1.85 m)	4.71 s	1.63 s	2.72 s	4.50 s	7.03 s	30.5 in (0.77 m)	9 ft 4 in (2.84 m)	21 reps
All values from Pro Day

=== Miami Dolphins ===
On May 8, 2026, Hankerson signed with the Miami Dolphins as an undrafted free agent. On August 10, he was waived by the Dolphins.

=== Seattle Seahawks ===
On August 17, 2026, Hankerson signed with the Seattle Seahawks. On August 24, he was waived by the Seahawks.
