= Carlos Hernandez (American football) =

American football player (born 2005)

No. 8 – Wake Forest Demon Deacons
- Position: Wide receiver
- Class: Senior

Personal information
- Born: May 6, 2005 (age 21)
- Listed height: 6 ft 0 in (1.83 m)
- Listed weight: 190 lb (86 kg)

Career information
- High school: Monrovia (Monrovia, California)
- College: Washington State (2023–2024); Wake Forest (2025–present)
- Stats at ESPN

Carlos Hernandez (born May 6, 2005) is an American college football wide receiver for the Wake Forest Demon Deacons. He previously played for the Washington State Cougars.

== Early life ==
Hernandez attended Monrovia High School in Monrovia, California. As a junior he had 71 receptions for 1,594 yards with 23 touchdowns and as a senior had 46 receptions for 860 yards and 10 touchdowns. He was named the Rio Hondo League MVP both seasons. He committed to Washington State University to play college football.

== College career ==
Hernandez played in 20 games with six starts at Washington State in 2023 and 2024, recording 55 receptions for 655 yards and five touchdowns. After the 2024 season, he entered the transfer portal and committed to Wake Forest University. In his first season at Wake Forest in 2025, Hernandez played in all 13 games and had 40 receptions for 611 yards and three touchdowns. He returned to Wake Forest in 2026 as the team’s number one receiver.
