= Tristan Ti'a =

American football player

No. 10 – Auburn Tigers
- Position: Quarterback
- Class: Redshirt Freshman

Personal information
- Born: Yuba City, California, U.S.
- Listed height: 6 ft 2 in (1.88 m)
- Listed weight: 205 lb (93 kg)

Career information
- High school: Amador Valley (Pleasanton, California)
- College: Oregon State (2025); Auburn (2026–present)
- Stats at ESPN

Tristan Ti'a is an American football quarterback for the Auburn Tigers. He previously played for the Oregon State Beavers.

== Early life ==
Ti'a played for Amador Valley High School. He won the divisional championship with his team during his senior year in 2024.

== College career ==
=== Oregon State ===
Ti'a committed to Oregon State in October 2024. He played his first game against the Lafayette Leopards, completing one pass for four yards. Against the Tulsa Golden Hurricane, he played for the final twelve minutes of the game and threw for two touchdowns and 141 yards. His first and only start of the season came in the final game against the Washington State Cougars. He threw for 240 yards, with one touchdown and one interception in the 24-point loss. Following the season, he stated that he wanted to stay with the team. Despite this, he entered the transfer portal in January 2026.

=== Auburn ===
Ti'a committed to Auburn on January 12, 2026. He was the third quarterback to sign with Auburn through the 2026 transfer portal.

== Personal life ==
Ti'a was born in Yuba City, California.
