= 2026–27 NCAA football bowl games =

Series of college football bowl games following the 2026 season

- Season: 2026
- Number of bowls: 64 total: 48 in D-I; 3 in D-II; 15 in D-III
- All-star games: 3 FBS, 1 FCS
- Bowl games: December 12, 2026 – January 25, 2027
- National Championship: 2027 College Football Playoff; National Championship
- Location of Championship: Allegiant Stadium (Las Vegas, Nevada)
Bowl record by conference
Conference	Bowls	Record	Number of teams in final AP poll
ACC		0–0 (–)	
American		0–0 (–)	
Big 12		0–0 (–)	
Big Ten		0–0 (–)	
C–USA		0–0 (–)	
MAC		0–0 (–)	
Mountain West		0–0 (–)	
Pac-12		0–0 (–)	
SEC		0–0 (–)	
Sun Belt		0–0 (–)	
Independent		0–0 (–)	
- Note: CFP first-round games are included

The 2026–27 NCAA football bowl games are a planned series of college football bowl games in the United States, most of which will be played to complete the 2026 NCAA Division I FBS football season. Team-competitive bowl games in the Football Bowl Subdivision (FBS) will begin in mid-December 2026, and will conclude with the 2027 College Football Playoff National Championship on January 25, 2027. Several all-star games will follow.

== Schedule ==
=== Division I FBS bowl games ===
==== College Football Playoff bowl games ====
The College Football Playoff system will be used to determine a national champion of Division I FBS college football. This is the 13th year of the College Football Playoff era, and the third year using an expanded, 12-team format.

A committee of experts will rank the top 25 FBS teams after each of the final six weeks of the regular season. Upon release of the final rankings, the four power conference champions, the highest-ranked Group of Six conference team, and the seven highest-ranked remaining teams will be selected to compete in the College Football Playoff – but Notre Dame will be included if it's ranked in the top 12. The top four ranked teams will receive a first-round bye.

The first round of four games will be played at campus sites on December 18 and 19, 2026. The quarterfinal and semifinal rounds will played at the New Year's Six bowl games. The quarterfinal games will be played on December 30, 2026, and January 1, 2027, at the Fiesta Bowl, Peach Bowl, Rose Bowl, and Cotton Bowl. The semifinal games will be played on January 14 and 15, 2027, at the Orange Bowl and Sugar Bowl. The winners will advance to the 2027 College Football Playoff National Championship, to be played on January 25, 2027, at Allegiant Stadium in Las Vegas, Nevada.

All times are EST (UTC−5).

College Football Playoff games
Date	Time	Game	Site	Teams	Affiliations	Results	Attendance	Television	
Date	Time	Game	Site	Teams	Affiliations	Results	Attendance	Network	U.S. viewers (millions)
December 18	8:00 pm	On-campus (First round)	TBD					ESPN	
December 19	12:00 pm	On-campus (First round)	TBD					ABC / ESPN	
December 19	3:30 pm	On-campus (First round)	TBD					TNT / truTV (HBOMax)	
December 19	7:30 pm	On-campus (First round)	TBD					TNT / truTV (HBOMax)	
December 30	7:30 pm	Fiesta Bowl (Quarterfinal)	State Farm Stadium; Glendale, Arizona					TNT / truTV (HBOMax)	
January 1	12:00 / 4:00 / 8:00 pm	Peach Bowl (Quarterfinal)	Mercedes-Benz Stadium; Atlanta, Georgia					TNT / truTV (HBOMax)	
January 1	12:00 / 4:00 / 8:00 pm	Rose Bowl (Quarterfinal)	Rose Bowl; Pasadena, California					ABC / ESPN	
January 1	12:00 / 4:00 / 8:00 pm	Cotton Bowl (Quarterfinal)	AT&T Stadium; Arlington, Texas					ESPN	
January 14	7:30 pm	Orange Bowl (Semifinal)	Hard Rock Stadium; Miami Gardens, Florida					TNT / truTV (HBOMax)	
January 15	7:30 pm	Sugar Bowl (Semifinal)	Caesars Superdome; New Orleans, Louisiana					ABC / ESPN	
January 25	7:30 pm	College Football Playoff; National Championship	Allegiant Stadium; Las Vegas, Nevada					ABC / ESPN	

==== Non-CFP bowl games ====
For the 2026–27 bowl season, two bowl games were dropped, and three were added. The LA Bowl and the GameAbove Sports Bowl will no longer be played. The Poinsettia Bowl will return after an absence of ten years, and the Puerto Rico Bowl and San Juan Bowl will be played for the first time. The Xbox Bowl was renamed to the Frisco Football Classic. The Rate Bowl was renamed to the Cactus Bowl, and changed venues, returning to Mountain America Stadium in Tempe.

Bowl games that are not part of the College Football Playoff are listed below. Final CFP rankings, issued before these games were played, are listed where applicable.

Non-College Football Playoff games
Date	Time (EST)	Game	Site	Teams	Affiliations	Results	Attendance	Television	
Date	Time (EST)	Game	Site	Teams	Affiliations	Results	Attendance	Network	U.S. viewers (millions)
Dec 15	5:30 pm	Salute to Veterans Bowl	Cramton Bowl; Montgomery, Alabama					ESPN	
Dec 15	9:00 pm	Frisco Football Classic	Ford Center at The Star; Frisco, Texas					ESPN	
Dec 16	7:30 pm	San Juan Bowl	Hiram Bithorn Stadium; San Juan, Puerto Rico					ESPN	
Dec 18	11:00 am	Boca Raton Bowl	Flagler Credit Union Stadium; Boca Raton, Florida					ESPN	
Dec 18	2:30 pm	Gasparilla Bowl	Raymond James Stadium; Tampa, Florida					ESPN	
Dec 21	11:00 am	Myrtle Beach Bowl	Brooks Stadium; Conway, South Carolina					ESPN	
Dec 21	2:30 pm	Famous Idaho Potato Bowl	Albertsons Stadium; Boise, Idaho					ESPN	
Dec 22	1:30 pm	Puerto Rico Bowl	Juan Ramón Loubriel Stadium; Bayamón, Puerto Rico					ESPN	
Dec 22	5:00 pm	Cure Bowl	Acrisure Bounce House; Orlando, Florida					ESPN	
Dec 22	8:30 pm	Independence Bowl	Independence Stadium; Shreveport, Louisiana					ESPN	
Dec 23	2:00 pm	New Orleans Bowl	Caesars Superdome; New Orleans, Louisiana					ESPN	
Dec 23	5:30 pm	Armed Forces Bowl	Amon G. Carter Stadium; Fort Worth, Texas					ESPN	
Dec 23	7:30 pm	Poinsettia Bowl	Snapdragon Stadium; San Diego, California					CW	
Dec 23	9:00 pm	Frisco Bowl	Ford Center at The Star; Frisco, Texas					ESPN	
Dec 24	2:30 pm	New Mexico Bowl	University Stadium; Albuquerque, New Mexico					ESPN	
Dec 24	7:00 pm	Hawaii Bowl	Clarence T. C. Ching Athletics Complex; Honolulu, Hawaii					ESPN	
Dec 26	12:00 pm	Pinstripe Bowl	Yankee Stadium; Bronx, New York					ABC	
Dec 26	2:00 pm	Fenway Bowl	Fenway Park; Boston, Massachusetts					ESPN	
Dec 26	3:30 pm	Duke's Mayo Bowl	Bank of America Stadium; Charlotte, North Carolina					ABC	
Dec 26	5:30 pm	68 Ventures Bowl	Hancock Whitney Stadium; Mobile, Alabama					ESPN	
Dec 26	7:30 pm	Cactus Bowl	Mountain America Stadium; Tempe, Arizona					ABC	
Dec 28	2:00 pm	Military Bowl	Navy–Marine Corps Memorial Stadium; Annapolis, Maryland					ESPN	
Dec 28	5:00 pm	Holiday Bowl	Snapdragon Stadium; San Diego, California					CW	
Dec 29	2:00 pm	Birmingham Bowl	Protective Stadium; Birmingham, Alabama					ESPN	
Dec 29	5:30 pm	Pop-Tarts Bowl	Camping World Stadium; Orlando, Florida					ESPN	
Dec 29	9:00 pm	Alamo Bowl	Alamodome; San Antonio, Texas					ESPN	
Dec 30	11:30 am	Gator Bowl	EverBank Stadium; Jacksonville, Florida					ESPN	
Dec 30	3:00 pm	Music City Bowl	Nissan Stadium; Nashville, Tennessee					ESPN	
Dec 31	12:00 pm	ReliaQuest Bowl	Raymond James Stadium; Tampa, Florida					ESPN	
Dec 31	2:00 pm	Sun Bowl	Sun Bowl; El Paso, Texas					CBS	
Dec 31	3:45 pm	Las Vegas Bowl	Allegiant Stadium; Paradise, Nevada					ESPN	
Dec 31	7:30 pm	Texas Bowl	Reliant Stadium; Houston, Texas					ESPN	
Jan 2	12:00 pm	Citrus Bowl	Camping World Stadium; Orlando, Florida					ABC	
Jan 2	3:30 pm	First Responder Bowl	Gerald J. Ford Stadium; Dallas, Texas					ABC	
Jan 2	4:30 pm	Arizona Bowl	Casino Del Sol Stadium; Tucson, Arizona					CW	
Jan 2	7:30 pm	Liberty Bowl	Simmons Bank Liberty Stadium; Memphis, Tennessee					ABC	

=== Division I FCS bowl game ===
The Football Championship Subdivision (FCS) has one bowl game, the Celebration Bowl. Played between HBCUs, it served as a de facto Black college football national championship.

Date	Time (EST)	Game	Site	Television	Teams	Affiliations	Results
Dec 12	Noon	Celebration Bowl	Mercedes-Benz Stadium; Atlanta, Georgia	ABC		MEAC; SWAC	

=== Division II bowl games ===
Division II will hold 3 bowl games in 2026, featuring teams that did not qualify for the Division II postseason tournament.

Date	Time (EST)	Game	Site	Television	Teams	Affiliations	Results
Dec. 5	1 p.m.	Heritage Bowl	Community National Bank and Trust Stadium; Corsicana, Texas	Livestream	Central Missouri; SE Oklahoma State	MIAA; GAC	
Dec. 5	TBD	Albanese Candy Bowl	Brickyard Stadium; Hobart, Indiana	TBD			
Dec. 5	2 p.m.	First Americans Bowl	Doc Wadley Stadium; Tahlequah, Oklahoma	FloSports	Chadron State; Northeastern State	RMAC; Independent	

=== Division III bowl games ===
Division III will hold 15 bowl games in 2026, featuring teams that did not qualify for the Division III postseason tournament.

Date	Time (EST)	Game	Site	Streaming	Teams	Affiliations	Results
Nov 20	6:30 PM	Bushnell Bowl	Campus sites		Brockport; Montclair State*	Empire 8 NJAC	Brockport 52; Montclair State 19
Nov 21	12:00 PM	Centennial-MAC; Bowl Series	Campus sites	Centennial Digital Network; MACtv	Misericordia; Franklin & Marshall*	Centennial; MAC	Misericordia 7 Franklin & Marshall 31
Nov 21	12:00 PM	Centennial-MAC; Bowl Series	Campus sites	Centennial Digital Network; MACtv	Ursinus; Delaware Valley*	Centennial; MAC	Ursinus 19; Delaware Valley 17
Nov 21	1:00 PM	Centennial-MAC; Bowl Series	Campus sites	Centennial Digital Network; MACtv	Carnegie Mellon; Stevenson*	Centennial; MAC	Carnegie Mellon 35; Stevenson 16
Nov 21	12:00 PM	Whitelaw Bowl	Campus sites		St. John Fisher; Allegheny*	Empire 8 PAC	St. John Fisher 24; Allegheny 21
Nov 21	1:00 PM	Chapman Bowl	Campus sites		Alfred State; Hobart*	Empire 8 Liberty	Alfred State 14; Hobart 63
Nov 21	12:00 PM	Lakefront Bowl	Raabe Stadium; Wauwatosa, Wisconsin	JustAGame	St. Norbert; Chicago	MWC; NACC	St. Norbert 21; Chicago 28
Nov 21	12:00 PM	Fusion Bowl	Campus sites	Northeast Sports Network	Western New England; MIT*	CNE; NEWMAC	Western New England 14; MIT 24
Nov 21	12:00 PM	Cape Henry Bowl	Campus sites	FloSports	Randolph–Macon; Lycoming*	Landmark; ODAC	Randolph–Macon 21; Lycoming 17
Nov 21	12:00 PM	Cape Charles Bowl	Campus sites	FloSports	Wilkes; Washington & Lee*	Landmark; ODAC	Wilkes 21; Washington and Lee 7
Nov 21	3:00 PM	Isthmus Bowl	Bank of Sun Prairie Stadium; Sun Prairie, Wisconsin	JustAGame	Wisconsin–River Falls; Illinois Wesleyan	WIAC; CCIW	Wisconsin–River Falls 55; Illinois Wesleyan 24
Nov 21	1:00 PM	ForeverLawn Bowl	Tom Benson Hall of Fame Stadium; Canton, Ohio	FloSports	Ohio Northern; Mount St. Joseph	OAC; HCAC	Ohio Northern 14; Mount St. Joseph 21
Nov 21	6:00 PM	Extra Points Bowl	Tom Benson Hall of Fame Stadium; Canton, Ohio	FloSports	Grove City; John Carroll	PAC; NCAC	Grove City 19; John Carroll 43
Nov 21	1:00 PM	Riverbend; Bowl Series	Rocket Stadium; Neenah, Wisconsin	HomeTeam	Lake Forest; Coe	MWC; ARC	Lake Forest 24; Coe 21
Nov 21	6:00 PM	Riverbend; Bowl Series	Rocket Stadium; Neenah, Wisconsin	HomeTeam	Dubuque; Aurora	ARC; NACC	Dubuque 45; Aurora 42

* - Host team

=== All-star games ===
Date	Time (EST)	Game	Site	Television	Participants	Results	Ref.
Jan. 9		Hula Bowl	Brooks Stadium; Conway, South Carolina		Team Kai; Team Aina		
Feb. 4	7 pm	East–West Shrine Bowl	AT&T Stadium; Arlington, Texas	ION	East Team; West Team		
Jan. 30	1pm	Senior Bowl	Hancock Whitney Stadium; Mobile, Alabama	NFL Network	American Team; National Team		
Feb. 27	4pm	HBCU Legacy Bowl	Center Parc Stadium; Atlanta, Georgia		Team Robinson; Team Gaither		

The HBCU Legacy Bowl features players from historically black colleges and universities (HBCU). Most HBCU football programs compete in the Mid-Eastern Athletic Conference (MEAC) or the Southwestern Athletic Conference (SWAC), which are part of FCS.

== Team selections ==
=== CFP top 25 standings and bowl games ===
The College Football Playoff (CFP) selection committee is expected to announce its final team rankings for the season on December 6, 2026.

The four power conference champions, the highest-ranked Group of Six conference team, and the seven highest-ranked remaining teams will be selected to compete in the College Football Playoff – but Notre Dame will be included if it's ranked in the top 12. This is a change from the previous year, when the five highest-ranked conference champions were automatically included, with no special provision for Notre Dame. The top four ranked teams will receive a first-round bye.

Rank	Team	W–L	Conference and standing	Bowl game
1				
2				
3				
4				
5				
6				
7				
8				
9				
10				
11				
12				
13				
14				
15				
16				
17				
18				
19				
20				
21				
22				
23				
24				
25				

Unranked conference champions' bowl games
Rank	Team	W–L	Conference and standing	Bowl game
–				
–				
–				
–				

=== Selection of teams ===
The below lists of teams are based on team records as published by the NCAA and bowl eligibility criteria.

==== Bowl-eligible teams ====
- ACC (11): Clemson, Duke, Louisville, Miami (FL), Pittsburgh, SMU, Stanford, Virginia, Virginia Tech, Wake Forest, winner of NC State–North Carolina game on November 28
- American (9): East Carolina, Florida Atlantic, Memphis, North Texas, South Florida, Tulane, Tulsa, UAB, UTSA
- Big Ten (14): Illinois, Indiana, Iowa, Michigan, Minnesota, Nebraska, Northwestern, Ohio State, Oregon, Penn State, UCLA, USC, Washington, Wisconsin
- Big 12 (10): Arizona, Arizona State, Baylor, BYU, Cincinnati, Houston, Oklahoma State, Texas Tech, UCF, Utah
- CUSA (4): Delaware, Jacksonville State, Liberty, Middle Tennessee
- MAC (5): Buffalo, Miami (OH), Ohio, Toledo, Western Michigan
- Mountain West (5): Air Force, New Mexico, North Dakota State, UNLV, Wyoming
- Pac-12 (5): Boise State, Fresno State, Oregon State, San Diego State, Texas State
- SEC (12): Alabama, Auburn, Florida, Georgia, Kentucky, LSU, Missouri, Oklahoma, Ole Miss, South Carolina, Tennessee, Texas
- SBC (7): Appalachian State, Georgia Southern, James Madison, Louisiana, Louisiana Tech, Marshall, South Alabama
- Independent (2): Notre Dame, UConn

Number of postseason berths available: 84

Number of bowl-eligible teams: 84

==== Teams that must win their next game for bowl eligibility ====
- American (1): Army (Note: Since the Army–Navy Game does not take place until after the bowl selection date, Army would become bowl ineligible with six losses before then)

Number of teams that must win their next game for bowl eligibility: 1

==== Teams that must win their final game for bowl eligibility ====
- ACC (5): Boston College, Florida State, North Carolina, NC State, Syracuse
- Big 12 (3): Iowa State, TCU, West Virginia
- CUSA (1): Kennesaw State
- MAC (1): Central Michigan
- Mountain West (1): Nevada
- SEC (1): Mississippi State
- SBC (1): Georgia State

Number of teams that must win their final game for bowl eligibility: 13

==== Bowl-ineligible teams ====
- ACC (3): California, Georgia Tech, loser of NC State–North Carolina game on November 28
- American (4): Charlotte, Navy (Note: Since the Army–Navy Game does not take place until after the bowl selection date, Navy became bowl ineligible with six losses), Rice, Temple
- Big Ten (4): Maryland, Michigan State, Purdue, Rutgers
- Big 12 (3): Colorado, Kansas, Kansas State
- CUSA (5): FIU, Missouri State, New Mexico State, Sam Houston, Western Kentucky
- MAC (7): Akron, Ball State, Bowling Green, Eastern Michigan, Kent State, Sacramento State, UMass (Note: As two of UMass' wins were against FCS opponents (Sacred Heart and Stonehill), the Minutemen needed seven wins to be bowl eligible and became bowl ineligible with their sixth loss)
- Mountain West (4): Hawaii, Northern Illinois, San Jose State, UTEP
- Pac-12 (3): Colorado State, Utah State, Washington State
- SEC (3): Arkansas, Texas A&M, Vanderbilt
- SBC (6): Arkansas State, Coastal Carolina, Louisiana–Monroe, Old Dominion, Southern Miss, Troy

Number of bowl-ineligible teams: 42

== Conference performance in bowl games ==
CFP bowl games are denoted in bold type. First-round CFP playoff games are included, and denoted as CFP1.

Conference	Games			Wins–losses (pct.)	Bowls		
Conference	CFP	Other	Total	Wins–losses (pct.)	Won	Lost	Remaining
ACC				0–0 (–)			
American				0–0 (–)			
Big 12				0–0 (–)			
Big Ten				0–0 (–)			
CUSA				0–0 (–)			
MAC				0–0 (–)			
Mountain West				0–0 (–)			
Pac-12				0–0 (–)			
SEC				0–0 (–)			
Sun Belt				0–0 (–)			
Independent				0–0 (–)			

Berths to be determined:

Notes:

- As the playoff progresses, additional CFP berths will be added to this table.
