= 2026 Frisco Bowl =

Postseason college football bowl game

- 9th Frisco Bowl
- Date: December 23, 2026
- Season: 2026
- Stadium: Toyota Stadium
- Location: Frisco, Texas

United States TV coverage
- Network: ESPN

The 2026 Frisco Bowl is a college football bowl game that is scheduled to be played on December 23, 2026, at Toyota Stadium in Frisco, Texas. The ninth annual Frisco Bowl will feature a team from the American Athletic Conference and an at large bid from any of the other Group of Five conferences. The game is scheduled to begin at 8:00 p.m. CST and will air on ESPN. The Frisco Bowl will be one of the 2026–27 bowl games concluding the 2026 FBS football season.

== Teams ==
Based on conference tie-ins, the game will feature teams from the American Athletic Conference, and an at large bid from any of the other Group of Five conferences.

== Game summary ==
2026 Frisco Bowl

Quarter	1	2	3	4	Total
	-	-	-	-	0
	-	-	-	-	0

at Toyota Stadium • Frisco, Texas

- Date: Wednesday, December 23, 2026
- Game time: 8:00 p.m. CST
- TV: ESPN
