= 2026 Armed Forces Bowl (December) =

Postseason college football bowl game

2026 Lockheed Martin Armed Forces Bowl
- 24th Armed Forces Bowl
- Date: December 23, 2026
- Season: 2026
- Stadium: Amon G. Carter Stadium
- Location: Fort Worth, Texas

United States TV coverage
- Network: ESPN

The 2026 Armed Forces Bowl is a college football bowl game that is scheduled to be played on December 23, 2026, at Amon G. Carter Stadium in Fort Worth, Texas. The 24th annual Armed Forces Bowl will feature a team from the Big 12 Conference and a team from the Group of Five conferences. The game is scheduled to begin at 4:30 p.m. CST and will air on ESPN. The Armed Forces Bowl will be one of the 2026–27 bowl games concluding the 2026 FBS football season. The game is sponsored by aerospace and defense manufacturing company Lockheed Martin, and is officially known as the Lockheed Martin Armed Forces Bowl.

== Teams ==
Based on conference tie-ins, the game will feature teams from the Big 12 Conference and Group of Five conferences.

== Game summary ==
2026 Lockheed Martin Armed Forces Bowl

| Quarter | 1 | 2 | 3 | 4 | Total |
|---|---|---|---|---|---|
| | - | - | - | - | 0 |
| | - | - | - | - | 0 |

at Amon G. Carter Stadium • Fort Worth, Texas

- Date: Wednesday, December 23, 2026
- Game time: 4:30 p.m. CST
- TV: ESPN
