= 2026 Cure Bowl =

Postseason college football bowl game

2026 StaffDNA Cure Bowl
- 12th Cure Bowl
- Date: December 22, 2026
- Season: 2026
- Stadium: Acrisure Bounce House
- Location: Orlando, Florida

United States TV coverage
- Network: ESPN

The 2026 Cure Bowl is a college football bowl game that is scheduled to be played on December 22, 2026, at Exploria Stadium in Orlando, Florida. The 12th annual Cure Bowl, will feature teams from the Group of Five conferences and the Atlantic Coast Conference. The game is scheduled to begin at 5:00 p.m. EST and will air on ESPN. The Cure Bowl will be one of the 2026–27 bowl games concluding the 2026 FBS football season. The game is sponsored by StaffDNA, a digital marketplace for healthcare jobs, and is officially known as the StaffDNA Cure Bowl.

== Teams ==
Based on conference tie-ins, the game will feature teams from the Group of Five conferences and the Atlantic Coast Conference.

== Game summary ==
2026 StaffDNA Cure Bowl

Quarter	1	2	3	4	Total
	-	-	-	-	0
	-	-	-	-	0

at Exploria Stadium • Orlando, Florida

- Date: Tuesday, December 22, 2026
- Game time: 5:00 p.m. EST
- TV: ESPN
