= 2027 First Responder Bowl =

Postseason college football bowl game

2027 Servpro First Responder Bowl
- 17th First Responder Bowl
- Date: January 2, 2027
- Season: 2026
- Stadium: Gerald J. Ford Stadium
- Location: University Park, Texas

United States TV coverage
- Network: ABC

The 2027 First Responder Bowl is a college football bowl game scheduled to be played on January 2, 2027, at Gerald J. Ford Stadium in University Park, Texas. The 17th annual First Responder Bowl, it is scheduled to begin at 2:30 pm CST and will be aired on ABC. It is one of the 2026–27 bowl games concluding the 2026 FBS football season. Sponsored by cleanup and restoration company Servpro, the game is officially known as the Servpro First Responder Bowl.

== Teams ==
The game is expected to feature teams from the Group of Five conferences, based on conference tie-ins.

== Game summary ==
2027 Servpro First Responder Bowl

Quarter	1	2	3	4	Total
	-	-	-	-	0
	-	-	-	-	0

at Gerald J. Ford Stadium • Dallas, Texas

- Date: Saturday, January 2, 2027
- Game time: 2:30 p.m. CST
- TV: ABC
