= 2026 Boca Raton Bowl =

Postseason college football bowl game

- 13th Boca Raton Bowl
- Date: December 18, 2026
- Season: 2026
- Stadium: Flagler Credit Union Stadium
- Location: Boca Raton, Florida

United States TV coverage
- Network: ESPN

The 2026 Boca Raton Bowl is a college football bowl game that is scheduled to be played on December 18, 2026, at Flagler Credit Union Stadium in Boca Raton, Florida. The 13th annual Boca Raton Bowl game will feature teams from any of the Group of Five conferences or FBS independent Army. The game is scheduled to begin at 11:00 a.m. EST and will air on ESPN. The Boca Raton Bowl will be one of the 2026–27 bowl games concluding the 2026 FBS football season.

== Teams ==
Based on conference tie-ins, the game will feature teams from the Group of Five conferences or FBS independent Army.

== Game summary ==
2026 Boca Raton Bowl

Quarter	1	2	3	4	Total
	-	-	-	-	0
	-	-	-	-	0

at Flagler Credit Union Stadium • Boca Raton, Florida

- Date: Friday, December 18, 2026
- Game time: 11:00 a.m. EST
- TV: ESPN
