= 2026 Celebration Bowl =

Postseason college football bowl game

2026 Cricket Celebration Bowl
- 11th Celebration Bowl
- Date: December 12, 2026
- Season: 2026
- Stadium: Mercedes-Benz Stadium
- Location: Atlanta, Georgia

United States TV coverage
- Network: ABC

The 2026 Celebration Bowl is a college football bowl game that is scheduled to be played on December 12, 2026, at Mercedes-Benz Stadium located in Atlanta, Georgia. The 11th annual Celebration Bowl game will feature the champions of the Mid-Eastern Athletic Conference and the Southwestern Athletic Conference. The game is scheduled to begin at 12:00 p.m. EST and will air on ABC. The Celebration Bowl will be the only one of the 2026–27 bowl games concluding the 2026 FCS football season. The bowl game will be sponsored by wireless service provider Cricket Wireless, and the game will be officially known as the Cricket Celebration Bowl.

== Teams ==
Based on conference tie-ins, the game will feature teams from the Mid-Eastern Athletic Conference and the Southwestern Athletic Conference.

== Game summary ==
2026 Cricket Celebration Bowl

Quarter	1	2	3	4	Total
	-	-	-	-	0
	-	-	-	-	0

at Mercedes-Benz Stadium • Atlanta, Georgia

- Date: Saturday, December 12, 2026
- Game time: 12:00 p.m. EST
- TV: ABC
