= 2026 Famous Idaho Potato Bowl =

Postseason college football bowl game

- 30th Famous Idaho Potato Bowl
- Date: December 21, 2026
- Season: 2026
- Stadium: Albertsons Stadium
- Location: Boise, Idaho

United States TV coverage
- Network: ESPN

The 2026 Famous Idaho Potato Bowl is a college football bowl game that is scheduled to be played on December 21, 2026, at Albertsons Stadium located in Boise, Idaho. The 30th annual Famous Idaho Potato Bowl game will feature teams from the Mid-American Conference and the Mountain West Conference. The game is scheduled to begin at 2:30 p.m. MST and will air on ESPN. The Famous Idaho Potato Bowl will be one of the 2026–27 bowl games concluding the 2026 FBS football season. The game's title sponsor is the Idaho Potato Commission.

== Teams ==
Based on conference tie-ins, the game will feature teams from the Mid-American Conference and the Mountain West Conference.

== Game summary ==
2026 Famous Idaho Potato Bowl

Quarter	1	2	3	4	Total
	-	-	-	-	0
	-	-	-	-	0

at Albertsons Stadium • Boise, Idaho

- Date: Monday, December 21, 2026
- Game time: 2:30 p.m. MST
- TV: ESPN
