= 2026 Frisco Football Classic =

Postseason college football bowl game

- 2nd Frisco Football Classic
- Date: December 15, 2026
- Season: 2026
- Stadium: Ford Center at The Star
- Location: Frisco, Texas

United States TV coverage
- Network: ESPN

The 2026 Frisco Football Classic is a college football bowl game that is scheduled to be played on December 15, 2026, at Ford Center at The Star in Frisco, Texas. The second annual Frisco Football Classic game will feature teams from the Conference USA, and Sun Belt Conference. The game is scheduled to begin at 8:00 p.m. CST and will air on ESPN. The Frisco Football Classic will be one of the 2026–27 bowl games concluding the 2026 FBS football season.

== Teams ==
Based on conference tie-ins, the game will feature teams from the Conference USA, and Sun Belt Conference.

== Game summary ==
2026 Frisco Football Classic

Quarter	1	2	3	4	Total
	-	-	-	-	0
	-	-	-	-	0

at Toyota Stadium • Frisco, Texas

- Date: Tuesday, December 15, 2026
- Game time: 8:00 p.m. CST
- TV: ESPN
