= 2026 Sun Bowl =

Postseason college football bowl game

2026 Old El Paso Sun Bowl
- 93rd Sun Bowl
- Date: December 31, 2026
- Season: 2026
- Stadium: Sun Bowl
- Location: El Paso, Texas

United States TV coverage
- Network: CBS

The 2026 Sun Bowl is a college football bowl game that is scheduled to be played on December 31, 2026, at the Sun Bowl stadium in El Paso, Texas. The 93rd annual Sun Bowl game will feature teams from the Atlantic Coast Conference and the Pac-12 Conference. The game is scheduled to kickoff at 12:00 p.m. MST and will be shown on CBS. The Sun Bowl will be one of the 2026–27 bowl games concluding the 2026 FBS football season. The game is sponsored by the Old El Paso brand of Tex-Mex-style foods, and is officially known as the Old El Paso Sun Bowl.

== Teams ==
The bowl has tie-ins with the Atlantic Coast Conference (ACC) and the Pac-12 Conference.

== Game summary ==
2026 Old El Paso Sun Bowl

Quarter	1	2	3	4	Total
	-	-	-	-	0
	-	-	-	-	0

at Sun Bowl • El Paso, Texas

- Date: Thursday, December 31, 2026
- Game time: 12:00 p.m. MST
- Game weather: Unknown
- TV: CBS
