= 2026 Las Vegas Bowl =

Postseason college football bowl game

- 34th Las Vegas Bowl
- Date: December 31, 2026
- Season: 2026
- Stadium: Allegiant Stadium
- Location: Paradise, Nevada

United States TV coverage
- Network: ESPN

The 2026 Las Vegas Bowl is a college football bowl game that is scheduled to be played on December 31, 2026, at Allegiant Stadium located in Paradise, Nevada. The 34th annual Las Vegas Bowl game will feature teams from the Pac-12 Conference and the Big Ten Conference. The game is scheduled to begin at 12:45 p.m. PST and will air on ESPN. The Las Vegas Bowl will be one of the 2026–27 bowl games concluding the 2026 FBS football season.

== Teams ==
Based on conference tie-ins, the game will feature teams from the Pac-12 Conference and the Big Ten Conference.

== Game summary ==
2026 Las Vegas Bowl

Quarter	1	2	3	4	Total
	-	-	-	-	0
	-	-	-	-	0

at Allegiant Stadium • Paradise, Nevada

- Date: Thursday, December 31, 2026
- Game time: 12:45 p.m. PST
- TV: ESPN
