= 2026 Pop-Tarts Bowl =

Postseason college football bowl game

- 37th Pop-Tarts Bowl
- Date: December 29, 2026
- Season: 2026
- Stadium: Camping World Stadium
- Location: Orlando, Florida

United States TV coverage
- Network: ESPN

The 2026 Pop-Tarts Bowl is a college football bowl game that is scheduled to be played on December 29, 2026, at Camping World Stadium in Orlando, Florida. The 37th annual Pop-Tarts Bowl (though only the fourth game under that name) will feature teams from the Atlantic Coast Conference and the Big 12 Conference. The game is scheduled to begin at 5:30 p.m. EST and will air on ESPN. The Pop-Tarts Bowl will be one of the 2026–27 bowl games concluding the 2026 FBS football season. The bowl game's title sponsor is Kellanova through their Pop-Tarts brand of toaster pastries.

== Teams ==
Based on conference tie-ins, the game will feature teams from the Atlantic Coast Conference and the Big 12 Conference.

== Game summary ==
2026 Pop-Tarts Bowl

Quarter	1	2	3	4	Total
	-	-	-	-	0
	-	-	-	-	0

at Camping World Stadium • Orlando, Florida

- Date: Tuesday, December 29, 2026
- Game time: 5:30 p.m. EST
- TV: ESPN
