= 2026 Texas Bowl =

Postseason college football bowl game

2026 Kinder's Texas Bowl
- 20th Texas Bowl
- Date: December 31, 2026
- Season: 2026
- Stadium: NRG Stadium
- Location: Houston, Texas

United States TV coverage
- Network: ESPN

The 2026 Texas Bowl is a college football bowl game that is scheduled to be played on December 31, 2026, at NRG Stadium in Houston, Texas. The 20th annual Texas Bowl game will feature teams from the Big 12 Conference and the Southeastern Conference. The game is scheduled to kickoff at 7:30 p.m. EST and will be shown on ESPN. The Texas Bowl will be one of the 2026–27 bowl games concluding the 2026 FBS football season. The game is sponsored by Kinder's, a maker of barbecue sauce and other seasonings, and is officially known as the Kinder's Texas Bowl.

== Teams ==
Based on conference tie-ins, the game will be played between teams from the Big 12 Conference and the Southeastern Conference (SEC).

== Game summary ==
2026 Kinder's Texas Bowl

Quarter	1	2	3	4	Total
	-	-	-	-	0
	-	-	-	-	0

at NRG Stadium • Houston, Texas

- Date: Thursday, December 31, 2026
- TV: ESPN

Game information

First quarter
Second quarter
Third quarter
Fourth quarter
