= 2027 Liberty Bowl =

Postseason college football bowl game

2027 AutoZone Liberty Bowl
- 68th Liberty Bowl
- Date: January 2, 2027
- Season: 2026
- Stadium: Simmons Bank Liberty Stadium
- Location: Memphis, Tennessee

United States TV coverage
- Network: ABC

The 2027 Liberty Bowl is a college football bowl game that is scheduled to be played on January 2, 2027, at Simmons Bank Liberty Stadium in Memphis, Tennessee. The 68th annual Liberty Bowl game will feature teams from the Big 12 Conference and the Southeastern Conference. The game is scheduled to begin at 6:30 p.m. CST and will air on ABC. The Liberty Bowl will be one of the 2026–27 bowl games that will conclude the 2026 FBS football season. The game is sponsored by automotive parts and accessories retailer AutoZone and is officially known as the AutoZone Liberty Bowl.

== Teams ==
Based on conference tie-ins, the game will feature teams from the Big 12 Conference and the Southeastern Conference.

== Game summary ==
2027 AutoZone Liberty Bowl

Quarter	1	2	3	4	Total
	-	-	-	-	0
	-	-	-	-	0

at Simmons Bank Liberty Stadium • Memphis, Tennessee

- Date: Saturday, January 2, 2027
- Game time: 6:30 p.m. CST
- TV: ABC
