= 2027 Arizona Bowl =

Postseason college football bowl game

2027 Snoop Dogg Arizona Bowl presented by Gin & Juice
- 11th Arizona Bowl
- Date: January 2, 2027
- Season: 2026
- Stadium: Casino Del Sol Stadium
- Location: Tucson, Arizona

United States TV coverage
- Network: The CW

The 2027 Arizona Bowl is a college football bowl game that is scheduled to be played on January 2, 2027 at Casino Del Sol Stadium in Tucson, Arizona. The 11th annual Arizona Bowl game will feature teams from the Mid-American Conference and the Mountain West Conference. It is scheduled to start at 2:30 pm MST and air on The CW. The Arizona Bowl will be one of the 2026–27 bowl games concluding the 2026 FBS football season. Sponsored by Snoop Dogg's drink brand Gin & Juice by Dre and Snoop, the game is officially known as the Snoop Dogg Arizona Bowl presented by Gin & Juice by Dre and Snoop.

== Teams ==
Based on conference tie-ins, the game will feature teams from the Mid-American Conference and also the Mountain West Conference.

== Game summary ==
2027 Arizona Bowl

Quarter	1	2	3	4	Total
	-	-	-	-	0
	-	-	-	-	0

at Casino Del Sol Stadium • Tucson, Arizona

- Date: January 2, 2027
- Game time: 2:30 p.m. MST
- TV: The CW
