= 2026 New Mexico Bowl =

Postseason college football bowl game

2026 Isleta New Mexico Bowl
- 21st New Mexico Bowl
- Date: December 24, 2026
- Season: 2026
- Stadium: University Stadium
- Location: Albuquerque, New Mexico

United States TV coverage
- Network: ESPN

The 2026 New Mexico Bowl is a college football bowl game that is scheduled to be played on December 24, 2026, at University Stadium in Albuquerque, New Mexico. The 21st annual New Mexico Bowl will feature teams from Conference USA and the Mountain West Conference. The game is scheduled to begin at 11:30 a.m. MST and will air on ESPN. The New Mexico Bowl will be one of the 2026–27 bowl games concluding the 2026 FBS football season. The Pueblo of Isleta, a Native American community that owns and operates a resort and casino, is sponsoring the game, which is officially known as the Isleta New Mexico Bowl.

== Teams ==
Based on conference tie-ins, the game will feature teams from the Conference USA, and the Mountain West Conference.

== Game summary ==
2026 New Mexico Bowl

Quarter	1	2	3	4	Total
	-	-	-	-	0
	-	-	-	-	0

at University Stadium • Albuquerque, New Mexico

- Date: Thursday, December 24, 2026
- Game time: 11:30 a.m. MST
- TV: ESPN
