= 2027 Rose Bowl =

Postseason college football bowl game

2027 Rose Bowl Game presented by Prudential
- College Football Playoff Quarterfinal; 113th Rose Bowl Game
- Date: January 1, 2027
- Season: 2026
- Stadium: Rose Bowl
- Location: Pasadena, California

United States TV coverage
- Network: ESPN

The 2027 Rose Bowl is a college football bowl game that is scheduled to be played on January 1, 2027, at the Rose Bowl stadium in Pasadena, California. The 113th annual Rose Bowl will be one of the 2026–27 College Football Playoff quarterfinal games, with the winner advancing to the semifinals. The starting time of the game will be either 9:00 am, 1:00 pm, or 5:00 pm PST – most likely 1:00 pm. The Rose Bowl will be one of the 2026–27 bowl games concluding the 2026 FBS football season. Sponsored by the Prudential financial services company, the game is officially known as the Rose Bowl Game presented by Prudential.

== Teams ==
The Rose Bowl will feature two College Football Playoff (CFP) teams – one of the four highest-ranked teams, which will receive a bye to the quarterfinals, and a winner of a CFP first-round game.

== Game summary ==
College Football Playoff Quarterfinal at the 2027 Rose Bowl Game presented by Prudential

Quarter	1	2	3	4	Total
	-	-	-	-	0
	-	-	-	-	0

at Rose Bowl • Pasadena, California

- Date: January 1, 2027
- TV: ESPN
