= 2026 Myrtle Beach Bowl =

Postseason college football bowl game

- 7th Myrtle Beach Bowl
- Date: December 21, 2026
- Season: 2026
- Stadium: Brooks Stadium
- Location: Conway, South Carolina

United States TV coverage
- Network: ESPN

The 2026 Myrtle Beach Bowl is a college football bowl game that is scheduled to be played on December 21, 2026, at Brooks Stadium in Conway, South Carolina. The seventh annual Myrtle Beach Bowl game will feature teams from the Conference USA, Mid-American Conference, or Sun Belt Conference. The game is scheduled to begin at 11:00 a.m. EST and will air on ESPN. The Myrtle Beach Bowl will be one of the 2026–27 bowl games concluding the 2026 FBS football season.

== Teams ==
Based on conference tie-ins, the game will feature teams from the Conference USA, Mid-American Conference, or Sun Belt Conference

== Game summary ==
2026 Myrtle Beach Bowl

Quarter	1	2	3	4	Total
	-	-	-	-	0
	-	-	-	-	0

at Brooks Stadium • Conway, South Carolina

- Date: Monday, December 21, 2026
- Game time: 11:00 a.m. EST
- TV: ESPN
