= 2026 Cactus Bowl =

Postseason college football bowl game

- 37th Cactus Bowl
- Date: December 26, 2026
- Season: 2026
- Stadium: Mountain America Stadium
- Location: Tempe, Arizona

United States TV coverage
- Network: ABC

The 2026 Cactus Bowl is a college football bowl game that is scheduled to be played on December 26, 2026, at Mountain America Stadium in Tempe, Arizona. The 37th annual Cactus Bowl (though the first under that name since 2017) will feature teams from the Big 12 Conference and the Big Ten Conference. The game is scheduled to begin at 4:30 p.m. MST and will air on ABC. The Cactus Bowl will be one of the 2026–27 bowl games concluding the 2026 FBS football season.

== Teams ==
Based on conference tie-ins, the game will feature teams from the Big 12 Conference and the Big Ten Conference.

== Game summary ==
2026 Cactus Bowl

Quarter	1	2	3	4	Total
	-	-	-	-	0
	-	-	-	-	0

at Mountain America Stadium • Tempe, Arizona

- Date: Saturday, December 26, 2026
- Game time: 4:30 p.m. MST
- TV: ABC
