= 2026 Independence Bowl =

Postseason college football bowl game

2026 Radiance Technologies Independence Bowl
- 50th Independence Bowl
- Date: December 22, 2026
- Season: 2026
- Stadium: Independence Stadium
- Location: Shreveport, Louisiana

United States TV coverage
- Network: ESPN

The 2026 Independence Bowl is a college football bowl game that is scheduled to be played on December 22, 2026, at Independence Stadium in Shreveport, Louisiana. The 50th annual Independence Bowl will feature a team from Big 12 Conference and a team from Conference USA. The game is scheduled to begin at 8:30 p.m. EST and will air on ESPN. The Independence Bowl is one of the 2026–27 bowl games that will conclude the 2026 FBS football season. The game is sponsored by engineering services company Radiance Technologies and is officially known as the Radiance Technologies Independence Bowl.

== Teams ==
Based on conference tie-ins, the game will feature a team from Big 12 Conference and a team from Conference USA.

== Game summary ==
2026 Radiance Technologies Independence Bowl

Quarter	1	2	3	4	Total
	-	-	-	-	0
	-	-	-	-	0

at Independence Stadium • Shreveport, Louisiana

- Date: Tuesday, December 22, 2026
- Game time: 8:30 p.m. EST
- TV: ESPN
