= 2026 Salute to Veterans Bowl =

Postseason college football bowl game

2026 IS4S Salute to Veterans Bowl
- 13th Salute to Veterans Bowl
- Date: December 15, 2026
- Season: 2026
- Stadium: Cramton Bowl
- Location: Montgomery, Alabama

United States TV coverage
- Network: ESPN

The 2026 Salute to Veterans Bowl is a college football bowl game that is scheduled to be played on December 15, 2026, at the Cramton Bowl in Montgomery, Alabama. It will be the 13th edition of the Salute to Veterans Bowl, formerly known as the Camellia Bowl. Based on conference tie-ins, the bowl may host teams from either the Mid-American Conference (MAC), Conference USA (CUSA), or the Sun Belt Conference. The game is scheduled to begin at 5:30 p.m. EST and will air on ESPN. The Salute to Veterans Bowl will be one of the 2026–27 bowl games concluding the 2026 FBS football season. Sponsored by information technology company Integrated Solutions for Systems (IS4S), the game is officially known as the IS4S Salute to Veterans Bowl.

== Teams ==
Based on conference tie-ins, the game will feature teams from either Conference USA, the Mid-American Conference, or the Sun Belt Conference.

== Game summary ==
2026 IS4S Salute to Veterans Bowl

| Quarter | 1 | 2 | 3 | 4 | Total |
|---|---|---|---|---|---|
| | - | - | - | - | 0 |
| | - | - | - | - | 0 |

at Cramton Bowl • Montgomery, Alabama

- Date: Tuesday, December 15, 2026
- Game time: 5:30 p.m. EST
- TV: ESPN
