= 2027 Cotton Bowl Classic =

Postseason college football bowl game

2027 Goodyear Cotton Bowl Classic
- College Football Playoff Quarterfinal; 91st Cotton Bowl Classic
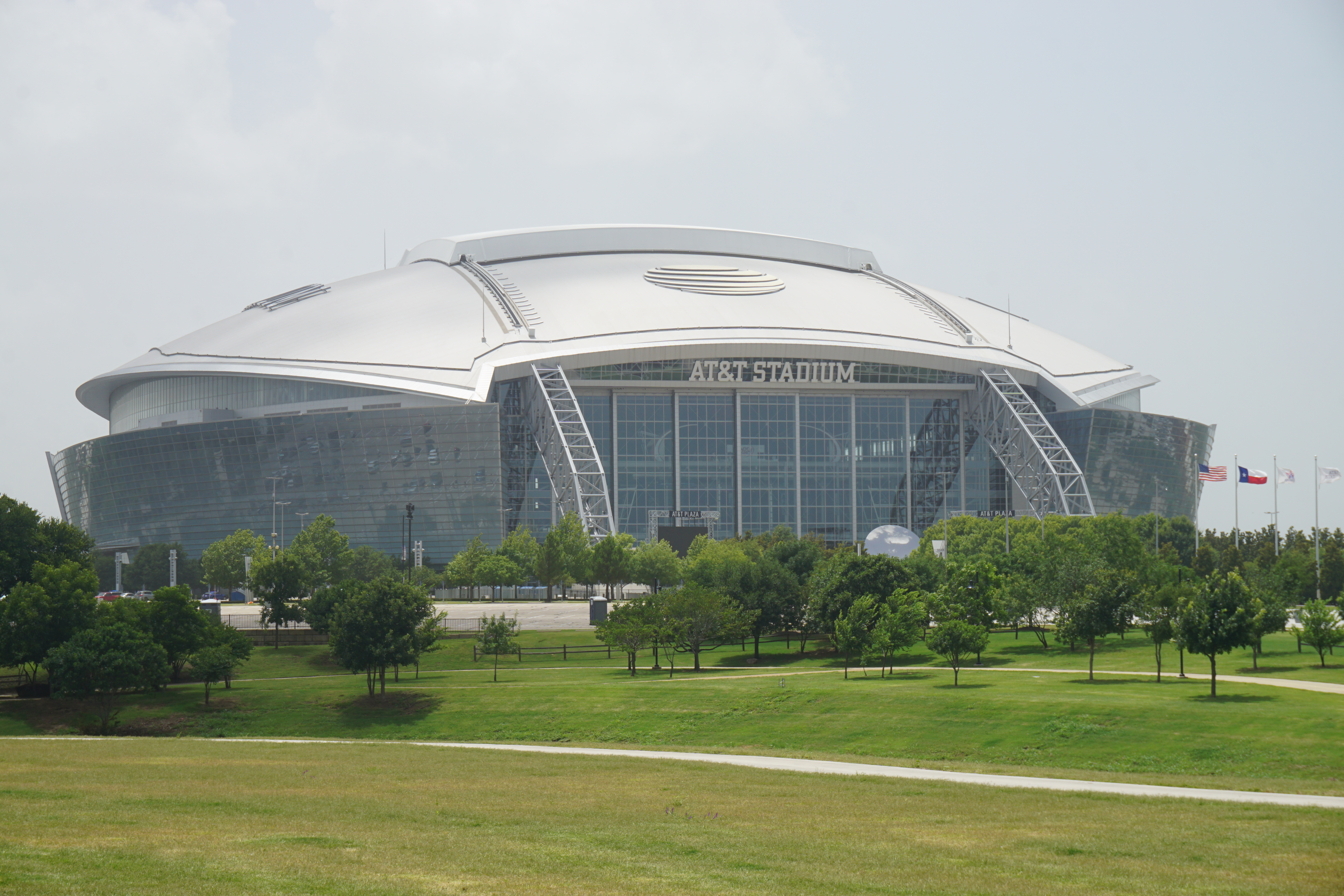
- AT&T Stadium in Arlington, Texas, the site of the Cotton Bowl Classic
- Date: January 1, 2027
- Season: 2026
- Stadium: AT&T Stadium
- Location: Arlington, Texas

United States TV coverage
- Network: ESPN

The 2027 Cotton Bowl Classic is a college football bowl game that is scheduled to be played on January 1, 2027 at AT&T Stadium in Arlington, Texas. The 91st annual Cotton Bowl Classic, will be one of the 2026–27 bowl games concluding the 2026 FBS football season. The Cotton Bowl will be one of the College Football Playoff (CFP) quarterfinal games, with the winner advancing to the semifinals. The game is sponsored by the Goodyear Tire and Rubber Company, the game is officially known as the Goodyear Cotton Bowl Classic.

== Teams ==
The Cotton Bowl, like the other College Football Playoff quarterfinal games, will feature a team that wins a CFP first-round game and a team that receives a first-round bye.

== Game summary ==
College Football Playoff Quarterfinal at the 2027 Goodyear Cotton Bowl Classic

| Quarter | 1 | 2 | 3 | 4 | Total |
|---|---|---|---|---|---|
| | - | - | - | - | 0 |
| | - | - | - | - | 0 |

at AT&T Stadium • Arlington, Texas

- Date: Friday, January 1, 2027
- Game time: TBA CST
- TV: TBA
