= 2026 ReliaQuest Bowl =

Postseason college football bowl game

- 41st ReliaQuest Bowl
- Date: December 31, 2026
- Season: 2026
- Stadium: Raymond James Stadium
- Location: Tampa, Florida

United States TV coverage
- Network: ESPN

The 2026 ReliaQuest Bowl is a college football bowl game that is scheduled to be played on December 31, 2026, at Raymond James Stadium in Tampa, Florida. The 41st annual ReliaQuest Bowl (though only the fifth under said name after being played as the Outback Bowl from 1996 to 2022), game will feature teams from the Big Ten Conference and the Southeastern Conference. The game is scheduled to begin at 12:00 p.m. EST and will air on ESPN. It will be one of the 2026–27 bowl games concluding the 2026 FBS football season. The game's title sponsor is the ReliaQuest cybersecurity company.

== Teams ==
Based on conference tie-ins, the game will feature teams from the Big Ten Conference and the Southeastern Conference.

== Game summary ==
2026 ReliaQuest Bowl

| Quarter | 1 | 2 | 3 | 4 | Total |
|---|---|---|---|---|---|
| | - | - | - | - | 0 |
| | - | - | - | - | 0 |

at Raymond James Stadium • Tampa, Florida

- Date: Thursday, December 31, 2026
- Game time: 12:00 p.m. EST
- TV: ESPN
