= 2026 Hawaii Bowl =

Postseason college football bowl game

2026 Sheraton Hotels and Resorts Hawaii Bowl
- 23rd Hawaii Bowl
- Date: December 24, 2026
- Season: 2026
- Stadium: Clarence T. C. Ching Athletics Complex
- Location: Honolulu, Hawaii

United States TV coverage
- Network: ESPN

The 2026 Hawaii Bowl is a college football bowl game that is scheduled to be played on December 24, 2026, at Clarence T. C. Ching Athletics Complex in Honolulu, Hawaii. The 23rd annual Hawaii Bowl will feature teams from the American Athletic Conference, Conference USA, or the Mountain West Conference. The game is scheduled to begin at 1:00 p.m. HST and will air on ESPN. The Hawaii Bowl will be one of the 2026–27 bowl games concluding the 2026 FBS football season. The game is sponsored by Sheraton Hotels and Resorts and is officially known as the Sheraton Hawaii Bowl.

== Teams ==
Based on conference tie-ins, the game will feature teams from the American Athletic Conference, Conference USA, or the Mountain West Conference.

== Game summary ==
2026 Sheraton Hawaii Bowl

Quarter	1	2	3	4	Total
	-	-	-	-	0
	-	-	-	-	0

at Clarence T. C. Ching Athletics Complex • Honolulu, Hawaii

- Date: Thursday, December 24, 2026
- Game time: 1:00 p.m. HST
- TV: ESPN
