= 2026 68 Ventures Bowl =

Postseason college football bowl game

- 28th 68 Ventures Bowl
- Date: December 26, 2026
- Season: 2026
- Stadium: Hancock Whitney Stadium
- Location: Mobile, Alabama

United States TV coverage
- Network: ESPN

The 2026 68 Ventures Bowl is a college football bowl game that is scheduled to be played on December 26, 2026, at Hancock Whitney Stadium in Mobile, Alabama. The 28th annual 68 Ventures Bowl (though only the fourth game under that name) will feature teams from the Mid-American Conference and the Sun Belt Conference. The game is scheduled to begin at 5:30 p.m. ET and will air on ESPN. The 68 Ventures Bowl will be one of the 2026–27 bowl games concluding the 2026 FBS football season. The title sponsor for the game is 68 Ventures, a company that does development, investment, and construction on the Gulf Coast.

== Teams ==
Based on conference tie-ins, the game will feature teams from the Mid-American Conference and the Sun Belt Conference.

== Game summary ==
2026 68 Ventures Bowl

Quarter	1	2	3	4	Total
	-	-	-	-	0
	-	-	-	-	0

at Hancock Whitney Stadium • Mobile, Alabama

- Date: Saturday, December 26, 2026
- Game time: 5:30 p.m. ET
- TV: ESPN
