= 2026 Gator Bowl =

Postseason college football bowl game

2026 TaxSlayer Gator Bowl
- 82nd Gator Bowl
- Date: December 30, 2026
- Season: 2026
- Stadium: EverBank Stadium
- Location: Jacksonville, Florida

United States TV coverage
- Network: ESPN

The 2026 Gator Bowl is a college football bowl game that is scheduled to be played on December 30, 2026, at EverBank Stadium in Jacksonville, Florida. The 82nd annual Gator Bowl will feature teams from the Atlantic Coast Conference and the Southeastern Conference. The game is scheduled to begin at 11:30 a.m. EST and will air on ESPN. The Gator Bowl will be one of the 2026–27 bowl games concluding the 2026 FBS football season. The game is sponsored by tax preparation software company TaxSlayer and is officially known as the TaxSlayer Gator Bowl. Attendance for the event will be reduced to 42,507 compared to previous years due to the stadium's complete renovation through the next two years.

== Teams ==
Based on conference tie-ins, the game will feature teams from the Atlantic Coast Conference and the Southeastern Conference.

== Game summary ==
2026 TaxSlayer Gator Bowl

Quarter	1	2	3	4	Total
	-	-	-	-	0
	-	-	-	-	0

at EverBank Stadium • Jacksonville, Florida

- Date: Wednesday, December 30, 2026
- Game time: 11:30 a.m. EST
- TV: ESPN
