= 2027 Orange Bowl =

Postseason college football bowl game

2027 Capital One Orange Bowl
- College Football Playoff Semifinal; 93rd Orange Bowl
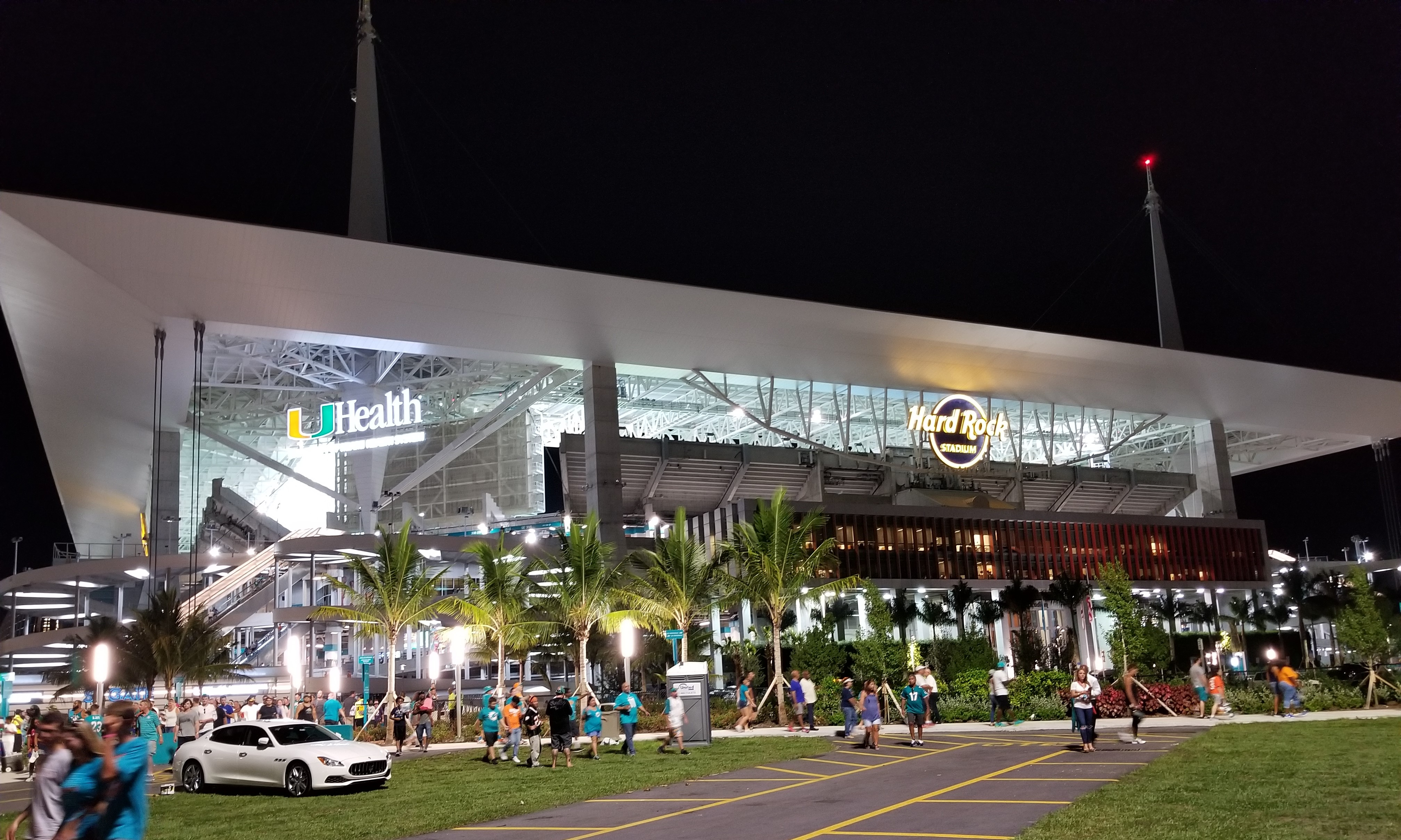
- Hard Rock Stadium in Miami Gardens, Florida, will host the Orange Bowl.
- Date: January 14, 2027
- Season: 2026
- Stadium: Hard Rock Stadium
- Location: Miami Gardens, Florida

United States TV coverage
- Network: TNT

The 2027 Orange Bowl is a college football bowl game that is scheduled to be played on January 14, 2027, at Hard Rock Stadium in Miami Gardens, Florida. The 93rd annual Orange Bowl, will be one of the 2026–27 bowl games concluding the 2026 FBS football season. The Orange Bowl will be one of the College Football Playoff (CFP) semifinal games, with the winner advancing to the National Championship. The game is scheduled to begin at 7:30 p.m. EST and will air on TNT. Sponsored by the Capital One bank holding company, the game is officially known as the Capital One Orange Bowl.

== Teams ==
The game will feature two College Football Playoff teams

== Game summary ==
College Football Playoff Semifinal at the 2027 Capital One Orange Bowl

Quarter	1	2	3	4	Total
	-	-	-	-	0
	-	-	-	-	0

at Hard Rock Stadium • Miami Gardens, Florida

- Date: Thursday, January 14, 2027
- Game time: 7:30 p.m. EST
- TV: TNT
