= 2026 Music City Bowl =

Postseason college football bowl game

2026 Liberty Mutual Music City Bowl
- 28th Music City Bowl
- Date: December 30, 2026
- Season: 2026
- Stadium: Nissan Stadium
- Location: Nashville, Tennessee

United States TV coverage
- Network: ESPN

The 2026 Music City Bowl is a college football bowl game that is scheduled to be played on December 30, 2026, at Nissan Stadium in Nashville, Tennessee. The 28th annual Music City Bowl game will feature teams from the Big Ten Conference and the Southeastern Conference. The game is scheduled to begin at 3:00 p.m. EST and will air on ESPN. The Music City Bowl will be one of the 2026–27 bowl games that will conclude the 2026 FBS football season. The game is sponsored by the Liberty Mutual insurance company and is officially known as the Liberty Mutual Music City Bowl.

== Teams ==
Based on conference tie-ins, the game will feature teams from the Big Ten Conference and the Southeastern Conference.

== Game summary ==
2026 Liberty Mutual Music City Bowl

| Quarter | 1 | 2 | 3 | 4 | Total |
|---|---|---|---|---|---|
| | - | - | - | - | 0 |
| | - | - | - | - | 0 |

at Nissan Stadium • Nashville, Tennessee

- Date: Tuesday, December 30, 2026
- Game time: 3:00 p.m. EST
- TV: ESPN
