= 2026 Duke's Mayo Bowl (December) =

Postseason college football bowl game

- 25th Duke's Mayo Bowl
- Date: December 25, 2026
- Season: 2026
- Stadium: Bank of America Stadium
- Location: Charlotte, North Carolina

United States TV coverage
- Network: ABC

The 2026 Duke's Mayo Bowl is a college football bowl game that is scheduled to be played on December 26, 2026, at Bank of America Stadium located in Charlotte, North Carolina. The 25th annual Duke's Mayo Bowl game will feature teams from the Atlantic Coast Conference and the Southeastern Conference. The game is scheduled to begin at 3:30 p.m. EST and will air on ABC. The Duke's Mayo Bowl game will be one of the 2026–27 bowl games concluding the 2026 FBS football season. The game's title sponsor is Duke's Mayonnaise.

== Teams ==
Based on conference tie-ins, the game will feature teams from the Atlantic Coast Conference and the Southeastern Conference.

== Game summary ==
2026 Duke's Mayo Bowl

Quarter	1	2	3	4	Total
	-	-	-	-	0
	-	-	-	-	0

at Bank of America Stadium • Charlotte, North Carolina

- Date: Saturday, December 26, 2026
- Game time: 3:30 p.m. EST
- TV: ESPN
