= 2027 Peach Bowl =

College football bowl game

2027 Chick-fil-A Peach Bowl
- College Football Playoff Quarterfinal; 59th Peach Bowl
- Date: January 1, 2027
- Season: 2026
- Stadium: Mercedes-Benz Stadium
- Location: Atlanta, Georgia

United States TV coverage
- Network: ESPN

The 2027 Peach Bowl is a college football bowl game that is scheduled to be played on January 1, 2027, at Mercedes-Benz Stadium in Atlanta, Georgia. The 59th annual Peach Bowl game will be one of the college football playoff quarterfinals game and will feature two of the playoff teams. The Peach Bowl will be one of the 2026–27 bowl games concluding the 2026 FBS football season. The game will be sponsored by restaurant chain Chick-fil-A, the game will be officially known as the Chick-fil-A Peach Bowl.

== Teams ==
The Peach Bowl, like the other College Football Playoff quarterfinal games, will feature a team that wins a CFP first-round game and a team that receives a first-round bye.

== Game summary ==
College Football Playoff Quarterfinal at the 2027 Chick-fil-A Peach Bowl

Quarter	1	2	3	4	Total
	-	-	-	-	0
	-	-	-	-	0

at Mercedes-Benz Stadium • Atlanta, Georgia

- Date: Friday, January 1, 2027
- Game time: TBA EST
- TV: ESPN
