= 2026 Alamo Bowl =

Postseason college football bowl game

2026 Valero Alamo Bowl
- 34th Alamo Bowl
- Date: December 29, 2026
- Season: 2026
- Stadium: Alamodome
- Location: San Antonio, Texas

United States TV coverage
- Network: ESPN

The 2026 Alamo Bowl is a college football bowl game that is scheduled to be played on December 29, 2026, at the Alamodome located in San Antonio, Texas. The 34th annual Alamo Bowl game will feature teams from the Big 12 Conference and the Pac-12 Conference. The game is scheduled to begin at 8:00 p.m. CST and will air on ESPN. The Alamo Bowl will be one of the 2026–27 bowl games concluding the 2026 FBS football season. The bowl game is sponsored by Valero Energy, a company that produces petroleum-based fuels, and is officially known as the Valero Alamo Bowl.

== Teams ==
Based on conference tie-ins, the game is scheduled to feature teams from the Big 12 Conference and the Pac-12 Conference.

== Game summary ==
2026 Valero Alamo Bowl

Quarter	1	2	3	4	Total
	-	-	-	-	0
	-	-	-	-	0

at Alamodome • San Antonio, Texas

- Date: Tuesday, December 29, 2026
- Game time: 8:00 p.m. CST
- TV: ESPN
