= 2026 New Orleans Bowl =

Postseason college football bowl game

- 26th New Orleans Bowl
- Date: December 23, 2026
- Season: 2026
- Stadium: Caesars Superdome
- Location: New Orleans, Louisiana

United States TV coverage
- Network: ESPN; ESPN Radio

The 2026 New Orleans Bowl is a college football bowl game that is scheduled to be played on December 23, 2026, at Caesars Superdome in New Orleans, Louisiana. The 26th annual New Orleans Bowl game will feature teams from Conference USA and the Sun Belt Conference. The game is scheduled to begin at 2:00 p.m. EST and will air on ESPN. The New Orleans Bowl will be one of the 2026–27 bowl games concluding the 2026 FBS football season.

== Teams ==
Based on conference tie-ins, the game will feature teams from Conference USA and the Sun Belt Conference.

== Game summary ==
2026 New Orleans Bowl

Quarter	1	2	3	4	Total
	-	-	-	-	0
	-	-	-	-	0

at Caesars Superdome • New Orleans, Louisiana

- Date: Wednesday, December 23, 2026
- Game time: 2:00 p.m. CST
- TV: ESPN
