= 2027 Sugar Bowl =

Postseason college football bowl game

2027 Allstate Sugar Bowl
- College Football Playoff Semifinal; 93rd Sugar Bowl
- Date: January 15, 2027
- Season: 2026
- Stadium: Caesars Superdome
- Location: New Orleans, Louisiana

United States TV coverage
- Network: ESPN / ABC

The 2027 Sugar Bowl is a college football bowl game that is scheduled to be played on January 15, 2027, at Caesars Superdome in New Orleans. The 93rd annual Sugar Bowl will be one of the 2026–27 College Football Playoff semifinal games, with the winner advancing to the National Championship game. It is scheduled to begin at 6:30 pm CST. The Sugar Bowl will be one of the 2026–27 bowl games concluding the 2026 FBS football season. Sponsored by the Allstate insurance company, the game is officially known as the Allstate Sugar Bowl.

== Teams ==
The Sugar Bowl will feature the winners of two of the College Football Playoff quarterfinal games.

== Game summary ==
College Football Playoff Semifinal at the 2027 Allstate Sugar Bowl

Quarter	1	2	3	4	Total
	-	-	-	-	0
	-	-	-	-	0

at Caesars Superdome • New Orleans, Louisiana

- Date: Friday January 15, 2027
- Game time: 6:30 p.m. CST
- TV: TBD
