= 2026 San Juan Bowl =

Postseason college football bowl game

2026 TransPerfect San Juan Bowl
- 1st San Juan Bowl
- Date: December 16, 2026
- Season: 2026
- Stadium: Hiram Bithorn Stadium
- Location: San Juan, Puerto Rico

The 2026 San Juan Bowl is a college football bowl game that is scheduled to be played on December 16, 2026, at Hiram Bithorn Stadium in San Juan, Puerto Rico. The inaugural San Juan Bowl game will feature teams from the Atlantic Coast Conference and Sun Belt Conference. The game is scheduled to begin at 8:30 p.m. AST. The San Juan Bowl will be one of the 2026–27 bowl games concluding the 2026 FBS football season. The game is sponsored by TransPerfect, a translation and language services company, and is officially known as the TransPerfect San Juan Bowl. The game will be the first bowl game played in Puerto Rico.

== Teams ==
Based on conference tie-ins, the game will feature teams from the Atlantic Coast Conference (ACC) and Sun Belt Conference.

== Game summary ==
2026 San Juan Bowl

Quarter	1	2	3	4	Total
	-	-	-	-	0
	-	-	-	-	0

at Hiram Bithorn Stadium • San Juan, Puerto Rico

- Date: Wednesday, December 16, 2026
- Game time: 7:30 PM EST
