= 2027 Citrus Bowl =

Postseason college football bowl game

- 81st Citrus Bowl
- Date: January 2, 2027
- Season: 2026
- Stadium: Camping World Stadium
- Location: Orlando, Florida

United States TV coverage
- Network: ABC

The 2027 Citrus Bowl is a college football bowl game that is scheduled to be played on January 2, 2027, at Camping World Stadium in Orlando, Florida. The 81st annual Citrus Bowl will feature teams from the Big Ten Conference and the Southeastern Conference. The game is scheduled to begin at 12:00 p.m. EST and will air on ABC. The Citrus Bowl will be one of the 2026–27 bowl games concluding the 2026 FBS football season.

== Teams ==
Based on conference tie-ins, the game will feature teams from the Big Ten Conference, and the Southeastern Conference.

== Game summary ==
2027 Citrus Bowl

Quarter	1	2	3	4	Total
	-	-	-	-	0
	-	-	-	-	0

at Camping World Stadium • Orlando, Florida

- Date: Saturday, January 2, 2027
- Game time: 12:00 p.m. EST
- TV: ABC
