= 2026 Birmingham Bowl =

Postseason college football bowl game

2026 JLab Birmingham Bowl
- 20th Birmingham Bowl
- Date: December 29, 2026
- Season: 2026
- Stadium: Protective Stadium
- Location: Birmingham, Alabama

United States TV coverage
- Network: ESPN

The 2026 Birmingham Bowl is a college football bowl game that is scheduled to be played on December 29, 2026, at Protective Stadium located in Birmingham, Alabama. The 20th annual Birmingham Bowl game will feature teams from the American Athletic Conference, Atlantic Coast Conference, or the Southeastern Conference. The game is scheduled to begin at 1:00 p.m. CST and will air on ESPN. The Birmingham Bowl will be one of the 2026–27 bowl games concluding the 2026 FBS football season. The game is sponsored by consumer audio company JLab Audio and is officially known as the JLab Birmingham Bowl.

== Teams ==
Based on conference tie-ins, the game will feature teams from the American Athletic Conference, Atlantic Coast Conference, or the Southeastern Conference.

== Game summary ==
2026 JLab Birmingham Bowl

Quarter	1	2	3	4	Total
	-	-	-	-	0
	-	-	-	-	0

at Protective Stadium • Birmingham, Alabama

- Date: Tuesday, December 29, 2026
- Game time: 1:00 p.m. CST
- TV: ESPN
