= 2026 Fenway Bowl =

Postseason college football bowl game

2026 Wasabi Fenway Bowl
- 5th Fenway Bowl
- Date: December 26, 2026
- Season: 2026
- Stadium: Fenway Park
- Location: Boston, Massachusetts

United States TV coverage
- Network: ESPN

The 2026 Fenway Bowl is a college football bowl game that is scheduled to be played on December 26, 2026, at Fenway Park in Boston, Massachusetts. The Fenway Bowl will feature teams from the Atlantic Coast Conference, the American Athletic Conference, or FBS independent Notre Dame. The game is scheduled to begin at 2:00 p.m. EST and will air on ESPN. The Fenway Bowl will be one of the 2026–27 bowl games concluding the 2026 FBS football season. The game is sponsored by cloud storage company Wasabi Technologies and is officially known as the Wasabi Fenway Bowl.

== Teams ==
Based on conference tie-ins, the game will feature teams from Atlantic Coast Conference, American Athletic Conference or FBS independent Notre Dame.

== Game summary ==
2026 Wasabi Fenway Bowl

| Quarter | 1 | 2 | 3 | 4 | Total |
|---|---|---|---|---|---|
| | - | - | - | - | 0 |
| | - | - | - | - | 0 |

at Fenway Park • Boston, Massachusetts

- Date: Saturday, December 26, 2026
- Game time: 2:00 p.m. EST
- TV: ESPN
