= 2026 Gasparilla Bowl =

Postseason college football bowl game

- 18th Gasparilla Bowl
- Date: December 18, 2026
- Season: 2026
- Stadium: Raymond James Stadium
- Location: Tampa, Florida

United States TV coverage
- Network: ESPN

The 2026 Gasparilla Bowl is a college football bowl game that is scheduled to be played on December 18, 2026, at Raymond James Stadium in Tampa, Florida. The 18th annual Gasparilla Bowl will feature teams from the American Athletic Conference, Atlantic Coast Conference, or Southeastern Conference. The game is scheduled to begin at 2:30 p.m. EST and will air on ESPN. The Gasparilla Bowl will be one of the 2026–27 bowl games concluding the 2026 FBS football season. The bowl game will be sponsored by mortgage loan company Union Home Mortgage, and the game will be officially known as the Union Home Mortgage Gasparilla Bowl.

== Teams ==
Based on conference tie-ins, the game will feature teams from the American Athletic Conference, Atlantic Coast Conference, or Southeastern Conference.

== Game summary ==
2026 Union Home Mortgage Gasparilla Bowl

Quarter	1	2	3	4	Total
	-	-	-	-	0
	-	-	-	-	0

at Raymond James Stadium • Tampa, Florida

- Date: Friday, December 18, 2026
- Game time: 2:30 p.m. EST
- TV: ESPN
