= 2026 Fiesta Bowl (December) =

Postseason college football bowl game

2026 Vrbo Fiesta Bowl
- College Football Playoff Quarterfinal; 56th Fiesta Bowl
- Date: December 30, 2026
- Season: 2026
- Stadium: State Farm Stadium
- Location: Glendale, Arizona

United States TV coverage
- Network: ESPN

The 2026 Fiesta Bowl is a college football bowl game that is scheduled to be played on December 30, 2026, at State Farm Stadium in Glendale, Arizona. The 56th annual Fiesta Bowl will be one of the College Football Playoff quarterfinal games, and the winner will advance to the semifinals. The game is scheduled to begin at 5:30 p.m. MST and will air on TNT. The Fiesta Bowl will be one of the 2026–27 bowl games concluding the 2026 FBS football season. The game is sponsored by vacation rental marketplace Vrbo and is officially known as the Vrbo Fiesta Bowl.

== Teams ==
The Fiesta Bowl, like the other College Football Playoff quarterfinal games, will feature a team that wins a CFP first-round game and a team that receives a first-round bye.

== Game summary ==
College Football Playoff Quarterfinal at the 2026 Vrbo Fiesta Bowl

Quarter	1	2	3	4	Total
	-	-	-	-	0
	-	-	-	-	0

at State Farm Stadium • Glendale, Arizona

- Date: Wednesday, December 30, 2026
- Game time: 5:30 p.m. MST
- TV: ESPN
