= 2026 Pinstripe Bowl =

Postseason college football bowl game

2026 Bad Boy Mowers Pinstripe Bowl
- 16th Pinstripe Bowl
- Date: December 26, 2026
- Season: 2026
- Stadium: Yankee Stadium
- Location: Bronx, New York

United States TV coverage
- Network: ABC

The 2026 Pinstripe Bowl is a college football bowl game that is scheduled to be played on December 26, 2026, at Yankee Stadium in Bronx, New York. The 16th annual Pinstripe Bowl will feature teams from the Atlantic Coast Conference and the Big Ten Conference. The game is scheduled to begin at 12:00 p.m. EST and will air on ABC. The Pinstripe Bowl will be one of the 2026–27 bowl games that will conclude the 2026 FBS football season. The game is sponsored by lawn mower manufacturing company Bad Boy Mowers and is officially known as the Bad Boy Mowers Pinstripe Bowl.

== Teams ==
Based on conference tie-ins, the game will feature teams from the Atlantic Coast Conference and the Big Ten Conference.

== Game summary ==
2026 Bad Boy Mowers Pinstripe Bowl

Quarter	1	2	3	4	Total
	-	-	-	-	0
	-	-	-	-	0

at Yankee Stadium • Bronx, New York

- Date: Saturday, December 26, 2026
- Game time: 12:00 p.m. EST
- TV: ESPN
