= Jalen Ortiz =

Current position
- Title: Interim head coach
- Team: Arkansas State
- Conference: Sun Belt
- Record: 0–1

Biographical details
- Born: July 1, 1994 (age 32); Alamogordo, New Mexico

Playing career
- 2013–2014: UCLA
- 2016–2017: Wyoming
- Positions: Wide receiver and defensive back

Coaching career (HC unless noted)
- 2018–2019: Wyoming (GA)
- 2020–2021: Oregon (Defensive backs GA)
- 2022–2023: Nevada (DB)
- 2024: Utah (DB)
- 2025–2026: Arkansas State (DB)
- 2026–present: Arkansas State (interim HC)

Head coaching record
- Overall: 0–1

Jalen Ortiz (born July 1, 1994) is an American football coach who is currently the interim head coach for the Arkansas State.

== Playing career ==
Ortiz was born on July 1, 1994, in Alamogordo, New Mexico. He and his parents later moved to Peoria, Arizona, where he attended Centennial High School. He committed to play college football for the UCLA Bruins over offers from Arizona State, Boise State, Utah, and Washington. Ortiz played for the Bruins from 2013 to 2014, recording four catches for 27 yards and five tackles in 26 games. After the 2014 season, he transferred to play for the Wyoming Cowboys. After sitting out a year due to transfer rules, Ortiz posted 11 tackles and a forced fumble in 14 games in 2016. As a senior in 2017, he started all 13 games, notching 61 tackles with four for loss, two pass deflections, and two fumble recoveries.

== Coaching career ==
Ortiz got his first coaching job in 2018 as a graduate assistant at his alma mater, Wyoming. In 2020, he joined Oregon as a graduate assistant. In 2022, Ortiz was hired as the cornerbacks coach at Nevada. Ahead of the 2024 season, he joined Utah State as the team's cornerbacks coach. In 2025, Ortiz was hired as the cornerbacks coach at Arkansas State. On November 17, 2026, Ortiz was promoted to serve as the Red Wolves' interim head coach after Butch Jones was fired.

== Head coaching record ==
Year	Team	Overall	Conference	Standing	Bowl/playoffs	Coaches^{#}	AP^{°}
Arkansas State Red Wolves (Sun Belt Conference) (2026–present)
2026	Arkansas State	0–1 (Note: Ortiz replaced Butch Jones with two games remaining.)	0–1				
Arkansas State:		0–1	0–1				
Total:		0–1					
National championship Conference title Conference division title or championship game berth
^{#}Rankings from final Coaches Poll.; ^{°}Rankings from final AP Poll.
