= 2026 Military Bowl =

Postseason college football bowl game

2026 Freedom Mortgage Military Bowl
- 17th Military Bowl
- Date: December 28, 2026
- Season: 2026
- Stadium: Navy–Marine Corps Memorial Stadium
- Location: Annapolis, Maryland

United States TV coverage
- Network: ESPN

The 2026 Military Bowl is a college football bowl game that is scheduled to be played on December 28, 2026, at Navy–Marine Corps Memorial Stadium in Annapolis, Maryland. The 17th annual Military Bowl game will feature teams from the American Athletic Conference, the Atlantic Coast Conference, or FBS independent Notre Dame. The game is scheduled to begin at 2:00 p.m. EST and will air on ESPN. The Military Bowl game will be one of the 2026–27 bowl games concluding the 2026 FBS football season. Sponsored by the Freedom Mortgage company, the game is officially known at the Freedom Mortgage Military Bowl.

== Teams ==
Based on conference tie-ins, the game will feature teams from the American Athletic Conference, the Atlantic Coast Conference, or FBS independent Notre Dame.

== Game summary ==
2026 Freedom Mortgage Military Bowl

Quarter	1	2	3	4	Total
	-	-	-	-	0
	-	-	-	-	0

at Navy–Marine Corps Memorial Stadium • Annapolis, Maryland

- Date: Monday, December 28, 2026
- Game time: 2:00 p.m. EST
- TV: ESPN
