= San Juan Bowl =

College football postseason game

- TransPerfect San Juan Bowl
- Stadium: Hiram Bithorn Stadium
- Location: San Juan, Puerto Rico
- Operated: 2026–present
- Conference tie-ins: Atlantic Coast Conference; Sun Belt Conference
- Website: www.sanjuanbowl.com

Sponsors
- TransPerfect (2026–present)

2026 matchup
- (December 16, 2026)

The San Juan Bowl is an annual NCAA Division I Football Bowl Subdivision (FBS) college football bowl game played at Hiram Bithorn Stadium in San Juan, Puerto Rico. The inaugural edition of the bowl will be held in December 2026. Owned by TransPerfect, the bowl has tie-ins with the Atlantic Coast Conference and Sun Belt Conference.

== History ==
On October 22, 2026, the San Juan Bowl was announced as a bowl game scheduled to debut in December 2026. Its inaugural edition is set to be the first bowl game played in Puerto Rico.

== See also ==
- List of college bowl games
