= 2026 NCAA Division I FBS football season =

American college football season

2026 NCAA Division I FBS season
- Number of teams: 138
- Duration: August 29 – December 12, 2026
- Preseason AP No. 1: Ohio State

Postseason
- Duration: December 15, 2026 – January 25, 2027

College Football Playoff
- 2027 College Football Playoff National Championship
- Date: January 25, 2027
- Site: Allegiant Stadium Paradise, Nevada

NCAA Division I FBS football seasons
- ← 2025

The 2026 NCAA Division I FBS football season is the 157th season of college football in the United States, the 121st season organized by the National Collegiate Athletic Association (NCAA), and the 51st of the highest level of competition, the Football Bowl Subdivision (FBS). The regular season began on August 29 and is scheduled to end on December 12. The postseason will begin on December 15, and, aside from any all-star games that are scheduled, end on January 25, 2027, with the College Football Playoff National Championship at Allegiant Stadium in Paradise, Nevada. This will be the third and final season of the 12-team College Football Playoff (CFP) system, with the bracket being expanded to 24 teams for the 2027 season.

== Conference realignment ==
On September 12, 2024, the Pac-12 announced that Mountain West Conference (MW) members Boise State, Colorado State, Fresno State, and San Diego State would join the Pac-12 in 2026. On September 24, 2024, the Pac-12 announced that another MW member, Utah State, would also join alongside the four aforementioned schools in 2026. Because Gonzaga, which also joined the Pac-12 in 2026, does not have a football team, this would have brought the number of Pac-12 football programs to being one short of the number needed to preserve its status as an FBS conference. This addition came later.

On October 1, 2024, UTEP announced that it would join the Mountain West from Conference USA starting in 2026. This gave the MW seven full football-sponsoring members in the 2026 season; it had to add at least one more such member no later than 2028–29 to preserve its FBS status. The needed eighth member proved to be Hawaiʻi, which had been a football-only MW member since 2012. On October 14, Hawaii athletic director Craig Angelos confirmed outside reports that the school would upgrade to full MW membership in 2026. The MW officially announced this move the next day.

On January 7, 2025, the Mountain West added a ninth member in Mid-American Conference member Northern Illinois joining as a football-only affiliate.

In June 2025, it was reported that Texas State would announce its move to the Pac-12 on June 30, 2025, the last day before that school's exit fee from the Sun Belt Conference would have doubled from $5 million to $10 million. Texas State's arrival, announced that same day, marked the ninth full-time member for the Pac-12 and also the eighth and final football member required to preserve FBS status.

On July 15, 2025, the Sun Belt announced its addition of Louisiana Tech for all sports no later than July 1, 2027. After a legal battle between Louisiana Tech and Conference USA over Tech's intended July 1, 2026, departure to the Sun Belt, a buyout agreement was reached that allowed Tech to join the SBC on its desired 2026 schedule.

February 2026 saw two conferences add football-only members—first the MW with 10-time FCS champion North Dakota State, and then the MAC with another FCS-to-FBS upgrader, Sacramento State.

Team	Conference in 2025	Conference in 2026
Boise State	Mountain West	Pac-12
Colorado State	Mountain West	Pac-12
Fresno State	Mountain West	Pac-12
Louisiana Tech	CUSA	Sun Belt
North Dakota State	MVFC (FCS)	Mountain West
Northern Illinois	MAC	Mountain West
Sacramento State	Big Sky (FCS)	MAC
San Diego State	Mountain West	Pac-12
Texas State	Sun Belt	Pac-12
Utah State	Mountain West	Pac-12
UTEP	CUSA	Mountain West

== Rule changes ==
The following playing rule changes were approved by the Division I Football Bowl Subdivision Oversight Committee on March 19, 2026:

- The targeting penalty (referring to the "carryover penalty" of missing the first half of the next game) will be altered for a one-year trial:
  - Players disqualified for their first targeting penalty of the season (regardless of which half it occurs) will be permitted to play the entire next game with no carryover penalty.
  - The second targeting penalty by the same player in the same season will incur the carryover penalty unless overturned on appeal to the National Coordinator of Officials. The appeal can include both the first and second targeting penalties.
  - The third or subsequent targeting penalty by the same player in the same season will be a one-game suspension unless overturned on appeal to the National Coordinator of Officials.
  - There is no carryover of targeting penalties to the following season.
- Adopt the fair catch kick used by the NFL. The decision to make the kick must be made by the head coach before the ball is signaled ready for play and is irrevocable.
- Also mirroring the NFL rule, offensive pass interference will become a 10-yard penalty; previously this was a 15-yard penalty.
- Teams will now receive two replay challenges, with a third challenge available if one of the two challenges is successful, also mirroring the NFL rule since the 2024 season.
- On punts where jersey number exceptions are used (players not wearing 50–79), the snapper and two adjacent linemen on either side lined up in or touching the tackle box are ineligible receivers and become exceptions to the numbering rule when the snapper takes his position.
- Unsportsmanlike conduct penalties will focus more on taunting, interference with game administration, and celebrations found demeaning to the game or opponent and five automatic unsportsmanlike penalties (throat-slash/nose wipe, pulling players off piles, any gestures of gun violence, removing of helmet after the ball is dead, and non-game-related actions of pushing, shoving, striking, etc.)
- After the two-minute time-out, if the game is stopped for a replay review, the play clock is frozen at the point of the stoppage. If the ruling on the field is upheld, the play clock will resume from the point it was stopped on the referee's signal. If there are fewer than 10 seconds on the play clock, it will be reset to 10 seconds.

As a result of the ending of the Western Michigan-Michigan game on September 5, the following changes to instant replay and time adjustments was made:

- The official time for all college football games is the time displayed on the in-stadium game clock. When a replay review requires time to be restored or otherwise adjusted, the replay official's decision will be based on the embedded game clock contained within the program feed. If the broadcaster is unable to provide an embedded game clock, the replay official will use the game-clock graphic displayed as part of the broadcast feed.
- The Big Ten Conference will allow total transparency on their instant replay process on all conference and home non-conference games effective with games of September 12 (previously this procedure was done on the conference's Friday evening games). The play under review, discussions between the replay officials and the game referee, and views from the replay center will be available to broadcasters, similar to the process used in the United Football League.

Points of emphasis for the 2026 season include:

- Continued focus on targeting (with the experimental rule eliminating the "carryover penalty" to the following game on the first targeting foul of the season), concussions, and defenseless players.
- Pre-snap actions by the offense, disconcerting signals by the defense, and offensive line alignment.
- Closely monitoring feigning injuries.
- Unsportsmanlike and taunting fouls (with the modification to limit the type of fouls deemed unsportsmanlike).
- Sideline control, especially for team personnel engaging officials with tablets to discuss a play (automatic unsportsmanlike conduct) and reinforcing that two unsportsmanlike conduct fouls against a coach results in that coach's ejection.
- Illegal hits on quarterbacks and receivers.
- Pace of play, game length, and adhering to substitution rules on both offense and defense.

== Notable headlines ==
- January 23, 2026 – The NCAA approved a rule change to allow teams to add commercial logos from sponsorships on uniforms, equipment and apparel. Teams may add two logos, each up to four inches in size, to uniforms, with one additional logo on equipment, for regular season games.
- March 5 – The University of Louisiana System filed suit against Conference USA (CUSA) on behalf of system member Louisiana Tech in the school's home of Lincoln Parish. The suit sought to allow the Bulldogs to leave CUSA for the Sun Belt Conference (SBC) on the school's desired July 2026 schedule.
- April 8 – Ross Dellenger of Yahoo Sports reported that the NCAA was considering a new athletic eligibility framework for Division I. Under the proposal, D-I athletes would have five full years of eligibility, starting on their 19th birthday or high school graduation, whichever is sooner. No redshirting would be allowed, even for medical reasons. Existing eligibility waivers for military service, religious missions, or (for women) maternity leave, would not be affected.
- April 27 – CUSA and Louisiana Tech reached a buyout agreement that allowed Tech to join the SBC that July.
- June 5 – The NCAA Division I Cabinet slightly modified the age-based eligibility proposal, addressing concerns raised by the men's basketball and men's ice hockey communities, as well as the service academies. Under the new proposal, expected to be voted on by the end of June, athletes' eligibility clocks would start upon their full-time college enrollment or the start of the academic year following their 19th birthday, whichever is sooner.
- June 23 – The Division I Cabinet unanimously approved the age-based eligibility proposal as modified earlier that month, officially taking effect with the end of the Cabinet's meeting the next day. Students enrolling full-time in college for the first time in 2026, plus those who had remaining eligibility under previous rules at the end of 2025–26, can use whichever model is most advantageous to them. Those who exhausted their eligibility under previous rules in 2025–26 will not receive any additional eligibility, even if they initially enrolled in 2022–23 (giving them four years of eligibility).
- June 24
  - On the same day the new age-based eligibility model took effect, a group of 15 college basketball players, all of whom graduated from high school in 2022 and exhausted their eligibility under the previous rules in 2025–26, filed suit in Hamilton County, Ohio, challenging the application of the new model to their high school cohort. Other suits on similar grounds were expected to be filed in other states.
  - On the final day of the Cabinet's meeting, it approved two changes to FBS postseason participation rules. First, teams transitioning from FCS will be immediately eligible for bowl games, as long as they finish the regular season no worse than 6–6 (with at least 5 wins over FBS teams) and meet FBS sports sponsorship and reclassification requirements. Second, whenever bowl slots remain empty after all fully qualified teams are placed, the Academic Progress Rate will only be used to exclude teams with 5–7 records from being eligible as alternates, and will no longer determine the order in which alternates are selected.
- June 26 – The FBS will move to a standardized 14-week regular season beginning in the fall of 2027. Each season will begin in Week 0 (the weekend prior to Labor Day weekend) and conclude the weekend after Thanksgiving. Teams will continue to be permitted to schedule 12 regular season games with two bye weeks in-season. It is unclear how this will impact teams that play 13 regular season games due to the "Hawaii Rule" which grants an additional home game to offset travel costs for playing at Hawaii.
- July 31 – Rulings in two separate court cases undercut the NCAA's planned "five for five" eligibility model as applied to 2022 high school graduates. First, a Tennessee state court judge granted a temporary injunction that allowed 19 basketball players in that class an extra season of eligibility. Several hours later, a federal judge in Colorado issued a preliminary injunction that applied to all members of the high school class of 2022 who had exhausted athletic eligibility, regardless of sport, and also provided those individuals an extra season of eligibility. The NCAA was expected to appeal.
- September 30 – The Times of Shreveport, Louisiana reported that during a September 22 meeting of the Louisiana Board of Regents at which budgets for members of the University of Louisiana System were discussed, one board member suggested that the system's three FBS programs—Louisiana, Louisiana–Monroe, and Louisiana Tech—drop to FCS due to large athletic program deficits. At this meeting, system president Rick Gallot told the regents that the system had contracted with Deloitte to evaluate the programs, with a final report due to the system by the end of 2026.
- October 12 – The American Conference announced that James Madison, a Sun Belt Conference member that houses its women's lacrosse and women's swimming & diving teams in the American, would join that conference for all sports no later than July 1, 2028.
- October 17 – An upset-filled day saw five of the top eight teams in the AP poll lose, with four of the winners being betting underdogs (the exception being #4 Ohio State over #5 Indiana). The other top-eight losers were #1 Georgia, #2 Notre Dame, #6 Alabama, and #7 Texas. This was the first time in AP poll history in which five top-eight teams lost on the same day. It was also the first time in which the AP's #1 team lost on the game's last play in consecutive weeks, with Auburn defeating Georgia 27–24 on a game-ending field goal a week after Oklahoma did the same against then-#1 Texas (with the final score being the same).
- November 9 – The College Football Playoff and ESPN signed a five-year agreement to expand to 24 teams starting next season, thus also marking 2026 as the last year of several conference championship games.
- November 14 – The start times of several games were moved due to the FAA ground stop. The Ole Miss–Oklahoma game was the only one moved to Sunday, November 15, due to Ole Miss not being able to make the trip to Oklahoma in time. Oklahoma athletic director Roger Denny issued a statement criticizing the decision to hold a Sunday game, that Ole Miss was the only team to be unable to make any Saturday game, and that the SEC threatened to issue Oklahoma a game forfeit if the team did not comply.
- November 19 – James Madison and the SBC reached a settlement that pushed the Dukes' departure date from that conference forward to July 2027.

== Stadiums ==
=== New stadiums ===
- On October 2, Northwestern opened the new Ryan Field on the site of the original Ryan Field, which had been the Wildcats' home from 1926 to 2023. The Wildcats defeated Penn State 34–13.

=== Planned openings for 2027 ===
- This is the final season for South Florida at Raymond James Stadium. The university is building a new on-campus stadium, tentatively known as USF Bulls Stadium, and plans to open it for the 2027 season.

== Kickoff games ==
=== Week 0 ===
The regular season began on Saturday, August 29 with Week 0.

Date	Time	Visiting team	Home team	Site	TV	Result	Attendance	Ref.
August 29	12:00 p.m.	North Carolina	TCU	Aviva Stadium • Dublin, Ireland (Aer Lingus College Football Classic)	ESPN	15–10	40,457	
^{#}Rankings from AP poll released prior to the game.

=== Week 1 ===
Date	Time	Visiting team	Home team	Site	TV	Result	Attendance	Ref.
September 5	3:30 p.m.	Baylor	Auburn	Mercedes–Benz Stadium • Atlanta, Georgia (Aflac Kickoff Game)	ABC	16–17	55,068	
September 6	7:30 p.m.	Wisconsin	No. 4 Notre Dame	Lambeau Field • Green Bay, WI (Shamrock Series)	NBC	13–41	75,939	
September 6	7:30 p.m.	No. 24 Louisville	No. 9 Ole Miss	Nissan Stadium • Nashville, TN (Music City Kickoff)	ABC	38–41	57,390	
^{#}Rankings from AP poll released prior to the game.

=== Week 3 ===
Date	Time	Visiting team	Home team	Site	TV	Result	Attendance	Ref.
September 19	Noon	Arizona State	Kansas	Wembley Stadium • London, England (Union Jack Classic/Big Noon Kickoff)	FS1	24–17	46,523	
September 19	7:30 p.m.	West Virginia	No. 25 Virginia	Bank of America Stadium • Charlotte, North Carolina (Duke's Mayo Classic)	ACCN	38–27	39,377	
^{#}Rankings from AP poll released prior to the game.

== No. 1 and No. 2 progress ==
Week	No. 1	No. 2	Date
Preseason	Ohio State (0–0)	Oregon (0–0)	August 17
Week 1	Ohio State (1–0)	Georgia (1–0)	September 8
Week 2	Texas (2–0)	Georgia (2–0)	September 14
Week 3	Texas (3–0)	Georgia (3–0)	September 21
Week 4	Texas (4–0)	Georgia (4–0)	September 28
Week 5	Texas (4–0)	Georgia (5–0)	October 5
Week 6	Georgia (6–0)	Notre Dame (6–0)	October 12
Week 7	Miami (FL) (6–0)	BYU (6–0)	October 19
Week 8	Miami (FL) (7–0)	Ohio State (6–1)	October 26
Week 9 (CFP rankings)	Miami (FL) (8–0)	Georgia (7–1)	November 3
Week 10	Georgia (8–1)	Utah (9–0)	November 10
Week 11	Georgia (9–1)	Utah (10–0)	November 17
Week 12			November 24
Week 13			December 1
Week 14			December 6

== Top 10 matchups ==
Rankings through Week 8 reflect the AP poll. Rankings for Week 9 and beyond list College Football Playoff Rankings first and AP poll rankings second; teams that were not ranked in the top 10 of polls are noted.

=== Regular season ===
Date	Time	Visiting team	Home team	Site	TV	Result	Attendance	Ref.
September 12	7:30 p.m.	No. 1 Ohio State	No. 4 Texas	Darrell K Royal–Texas Memorial Stadium • Austin, TX (College GameDay)	ABC	23–24	105,044	
September 19	7:30 p.m.	No. 7 LSU	No. 8 Ole Miss	Vaught–Hemingway Stadium • Oxford, MS (Magnolia Bowl, College GameDay)	ABC	24–32	70,033	
October 10	7:30 p.m.	No. 2 Georgia	No. 6 Alabama	Bryant–Denny Stadium • Tuscaloosa, AL (College GameDay, rivalry)	ABC	20–17	100,077	
October 17	12:00 p.m.	No. 4 Ohio State	No. 5 Indiana	Memorial Stadium • Bloomington, IN (Big Noon Kickoff)	FOX	19–15	54,532	
October 17	7:30 p.m.	No. 2 Notre Dame	No. 8 BYU	LaVell Edwards Stadium • Provo, UT (College GameDay)	ABC	24–28	65,179	
November 7	12:00 p.m.	No. 7/9 BYU	No. 3 Utah	Rice–Eccles Stadium • Salt Lake City, UT (Holy War)	ABC	20–28	52,901	
November 7	7:30 p.m.	No. 1 Miami	No. 4/11 Notre Dame	Notre Dame Stadium • South Bend, IN (rivalry, College GameDay)	NBC	24–31	77,622	
November 7	7:30 p.m.	No. 2 Georgia	No. 12/10 Ole Miss	Vaught–Hemingway Stadium • Oxford, MS	ABC	42–7	68,814	
^{#}Rankings from AP poll and CFP released prior to the game.

== Upsets ==
This section lists unranked teams defeating AP Poll and College Football Playoff-ranked teams during the season.

=== Regular season upsets ===
Date	Time	Visiting team	Home team	Site	TV	Result	Attendance	Ref.
September 12	12:00 p.m.	No. 11 Oklahoma	Michigan	Michigan Stadium • Ann Arbor, MI (Big Noon Kickoff)	FOX	10–17	111,240	
September 12	12:00 p.m.	No. 6 Oregon	Oklahoma State	Boone Pickens Stadium • Stillwater, OK	ESPN	31–39	51,035	
September 19	3:30 p.m.	Kentucky	No. 9 Texas A&M	Kyle Field • College Station, TX	ESPN	31–21	105,186	
September 19	7:30 p.m.	West Virginia	No. 25 Virginia	Bank of America Stadium • Charlotte, NC (Duke's Mayo Classic)	ACCN	38–27	39,377	
September 26	12:00 p.m.	Wake Forest	No. 16 Louisville	L&N Federal Credit Union Stadium • Louisville, KY	ESPN	30–27	46,042	
September 26	5:00 p.m.	Wisconsin	No. 13 Penn State	Beaver Stadium • University Park, PA	Peacock/NBCSN	24–20	108,014	
October 10	12:00 p.m.	North Carolina	No. 25 Pittsburgh	Acrisure Stadium • Pittsburgh, PA	ESPN	21–17	51,416	
October 10	12:45 p.m.	South Carolina	No. 16 Florida	Ben Hill Griffin Stadium • Gainesville, FL	SECN	38–19	90,311	
October 10	3:30 p.m.	Oklahoma	No. 1 Texas	Cotton Bowl • Dallas, TX (Red River Rivalry, SEC Nation)	ABC	27–24	92,100	
October 10	7:00 p.m.	No. 10 LSU	Kentucky	Kroger Field • Lexington, KY	ESPN	34–35 ^{OT}	61,897	
October 17	12:00 p.m.	Florida	No. 7 Texas	Darrell K Royal–Texas Memorial Stadium • Austin, TX	ABC	27–24	103,989	
October 17	3:30 p.m.	Auburn	No. 1 Georgia	Sanford Stadium • Athens, GA (Deep South's Oldest Rivalry)	ESPN	27–24	93,033	
October 24	12:00 p.m.	No. 8 Texas Tech	Cincinnati	Nippert Stadium • Cincinnati, OH	FS1	24–37	38,088	
October 24	3:30 p.m.	No. 2 BYU	UCF	Acrisure Bounce House • Orlando, FL	FOX	31–39 ^{2OT}	45,112	
October 24	3:30 p.m.	No. 11 Tennessee	South Carolina	Williams–Brice Stadium • Columbia, SC	ESPN	24–27	79,193	
October 24	3:30 p.m.	No. 15 Iowa	Minnesota	Huntington Bank Stadium • Minneapolis, MN (rivalry)	FS1	10–13	53,004	
October 24	7:30 p.m.	No. 16 USC	Wisconsin	Camp Randall Stadium • Madison, WI	NBC	7–24	71,750	
October 31	12:00 p.m.	No. 19 SMU	Syracuse	JMA Wireless Dome • Syracuse, NY	ESPN2	27–30	33,396	
October 31	12:00 p.m.	No. 25 Wisconsin	Iowa	Kinnick Stadium • Iowa City, IA (Rivalry)	FOX	0–30	69,250	
October 31	3:30 p.m.	No. 20 Northwestern	Oregon	Autzen Stadium • Eugene, OR	Peacock/NBCSN	26–34	55,673	
October 31	7:00 p.m.	No. 24 Oklahoma State	Iowa State	Jack Trice Stadium • Ames, IA	FOX	49–51	50,295	
October 31	7:30 p.m.	No. 2 Ohio State	USC	Los Angeles Memorial Coliseum • Los Angeles, CA	NBC	18–30	70,810	
November 7	3:30 p.m.	No. RV/23 Oregon	No. 11/12 Ohio State	Ohio Stadium • Columbus, OH	CBS	41–28	103,551	
November 7	7:45 p.m.	Oklahoma	No. 25/24 Florida	Ben Hill Griffin Stadium • Gainesville, FL	SECN	23–7	90,442	
November 13	10:15 p.m.	No. 14 Houston	Colorado	Folsom Field • Boulder, CO	ESPN	32–42	47,495	
November 14	6:15 p.m.	Florida	No. 13/11 Kentucky	Kroger Field • Lexington, KY (Rivalry)	ESPN	21–14	61,866	
November 14	7:30 p.m.	UNLV	No. 23/NR New Mexico	University Stadium • Albuquerque, NM	CW	21–17	37,440	
November 14	7:45 p.m.	No. 20/17 South Carolina	Arkansas	Razorback Stadium • Fayetteville, AR	SECN	6–34	63,334	
November 15	1:00 p.m.	No. 19 Ole Miss	Oklahoma	Gaylord Family Oklahoma Memorial Stadium • Norman, OK	SECN	17–24	83,226	
November 21	12:00 p.m.	No. 16/14 Ohio State	Nebraska	Memorial Stadium • Lincoln, NE	FOX	28–31	85,699	
November 21	12:00 p.m.	No. 24/NR Memphis	Navy	Navy–Marine Corps Memorial Stadium • Annapolis, MD	ESPN2	34–38	29,080	
November 21	3:30 p.m.	No. 4 UCLA	Michigan	Michigan Stadium • Ann Arbor, MI	CBS	16–18^{3OT}	109,618	
November 21	3:30 p.m.	No. 6/8 Indiana	Washington	Husky Stadium • Seattle, WA	Peacock/NBCSN	24–27^{OT}	64,614	
November 21	7:30 p.m.	No. 17/16 Kentucky	Missouri	Faurot Field • Columbia, MO	SECN	14–28	63,609	
November 21	9:30 p.m.	San Diego State	No. 15/17 Boise State	Albertsons Stadium • Boise, ID	USA	22–20	34,430	
^{#}Rankings from AP poll and CFP released prior to the game.

=== Conference championship games ===
Date	Time	Visiting team	Home team	Site	TV	Result	Attendance	Ref.
^{#}Rankings from AP poll and CFP released prior to the game.

=== Postseason (bowl games) ===
Date	Time	Visiting team	Home team	Site	TV	Result	Attendance	Ref.
^{#}Rankings from AP poll and CFP released prior to the game.

=== Spreads ===
2026 NCAA Division I FBS upset rankings
Rank	Date	Underdog	Favorite	Spread	Score	Significance	Source
1	September 12	Oklahoma State	Oregon	+24.5	39–31		
2	November 21	San Diego State	Boise State	+20.5	22–20		
3	October 17	Auburn	Georgia	+19.5	27–24	Rivalry	
4	September 19	Kentucky	Texas A&M	+16.5	31–21		
5	October 17	Florida	Texas	+13.5	27–24		
6	September 26	Wake Forest	Louisville	+11.5	30–27		
7	October 24	Cincinnati	Texas Tech	+10.5	37–24		
7	October 10	South Carolina	Florida	+10.5	38–19		
7	September 19	West Virginia	Virginia	+10.5	38–27	Duke's Mayo Classic	
10	October 31	Iowa State	Oklahoma State	+10	51–49		
11	November 21	Washington	Indiana	+9.5	27–24^{OT}		
11	October 10	Kentucky	LSU	+9.5	35–34^{OT}		
11	September 26	Wisconsin	Penn State	+9.5	24–20		
14	October 31	Syracuse	SMU	+8.5	30–27		
15	November 13	Colorado	Houston	+7.5	42–32		
15	November 7	Oregon	Ohio State	+7.5	41–28		
15	October 24	Minnesota	Iowa	+7.5	13–10	Rivalry	
15	October 24	UCF	BYU	+7.5	39–31^{2OT}		
15	October 10	Oklahoma	Texas	+7.5	27–24	Rivalry	
20	November 14	Arkansas	South Carolina	+6.5	34–6		
20	October 31	USC	Ohio State	+6.5	30–18		
22	September 12	Michigan	Oklahoma	+5.5	17–10	Big Noon Kickoff	
23	November 7	Oklahoma	Florida	+4	23–7		
24	November 21	Michigan	UCLA	+3.5	18–16^{3OT}		
24	November 21	Nebraska	Ohio State	+3.5	31–28		
24	October 10	North Carolina	Pittsburgh	+3.5	21–17		
27	November 14	Florida	Kentucky	+3	21–14	Rivalry	
28	October 24	South Carolina	Tennessee	+2.5	27–24		
29	October 24	Wisconsin	USC	+1.5	24–7		
The following games are not considered an upset per the spread, despite the unranked team defeating the ranked team.: Iowa defeats Wisconsin 30–0 with a -2.5 spread on October 31, 2026.; Oregon defeats Northwestern 34–25 with a -4 spread on October 31, 2026.; Oklahoma defeats Ole Miss 24–17 with a -2.5 spread on November 15, 2026.; Missouri defeats Kentucky 28–14 with a -4.5 spread on November 21, 2026.

== FCS team wins over FBS teams ==
- Italics denotes FCS teams

Date	Time	Visiting team	Home team	Site	TV	Result	Attendance	Ref.
September 5	12:00 p.m.	No. 5 (FCS) Tarleton State	Bowling Green	Doyt Perry Stadium • Bowling Green, OH	ESPN+	20–13	13,367	
September 5	3:30 p.m.	The Citadel	Charlotte	Jerry Richardson Stadium • Charlotte, NC	ESPN+	43–41 ^{3OT}	13,274	
September 5	7:00 p.m.	No. 23 (FCS) Idaho State	Utah State	Maverik Stadium • Logan, UT	CBSSN	29–17	20,723	
September 12	7:00 p.m.	No. 5 (FCS) Illinois State	Northern Illinois	Huskie Stadium • DeKalb, IL	MW+	28–24	17,582	
September 12	10:30 p.m.	No. 1 (FCS) Montana State	Nevada	Mackay Stadium • Reno, NV	CW	20–7	21,679	
September 19	4:30 p.m.	Southeastern Louisiana	Louisiana–Monroe	FMOL Health/St. Francis Stadium • Monroe, LA	ESPN+	38–35	13,211	
^{#}Rankings from AP poll and CFP released prior to the game.

== Conference standings ==
2026 American Conference football standings
	Conf.			Overall
Team	W		L	W		L
UTSA	6	–	1	9	–	2
Memphis	5	–	2	8	–	3
East Carolina	5	–	2	7	–	4
North Texas	5	–	2	7	–	4
UAB	4	–	3	6	–	5
Army	4	–	3	5	–	5
Tulsa	4	–	3	7	–	4
Florida Atlantic	4	–	3	7	–	4
Tulane	4	–	3	6	–	5
Navy	3	–	4	4	–	6
South Florida	2	–	5	6	–	5
Rice	1	–	6	2	–	9
Charlotte	1	–	6	1	–	10
Temple	1	–	6	2	–	9
Championship: December 5, 2026
As of November 22, 2026; Rankings from AP poll

2026 Atlantic Coast Conference football standings
	Conf.			Overall
Team	W		L	W		L
No. 7 Miami (FL) y	8	–	0	10	–	1
No. 11 Wake Forest y	7	–	1	10	–	1
No. 23 Louisville	7	–	2	8	–	3
Clemson	5	–	3	7	–	4
SMU	5	–	3	7	–	4
Duke	4	–	4	7	–	4
Stanford	4	–	4	6	–	5
Virginia	4	–	4	6	–	5
Boston College	3	–	4	5	–	6
Pittsburgh	3	–	5	6	–	5
Virginia Tech	3	–	5	6	–	5
NC State	3	–	5	5	–	6
Florida State	3	–	5	5	–	6
Syracuse	3	–	6	5	–	6
North Carolina	2	–	5	5	–	6
California	2	–	6	3	–	8
Georgia Tech	2	–	6	3	–	8
Championship: Miami (FL) vs. Wake Forest
^ – College Football Playoff participant; $ – Conference champion; y – Championship game participant; As of November 22, 2026; Rankings from CFP rankings

2026 Big Ten Conference football standings
	Conf.			Overall
Team	W		L	W		L
No. 4 UCLA	7	–	1	10	–	1
No. 8 Indiana	6	–	2	9	–	2
No. 15 Iowa	6	–	2	9	–	2
No. 13 Oregon	6	–	2	8	–	3
No. 18 USC	5	–	3	8	–	3
No. 14 Ohio State	5	–	3	7	–	4
Wisconsin	5	–	3	7	–	4
Nebraska	4	–	4	7	–	4
Washington	4	–	4	7	–	4
Illinois	4	–	4	6	–	5
Minnesota	4	–	4	6	–	5
Michigan	3	–	5	6	–	5
Northwestern	3	–	5	6	–	5
Penn State	3	–	5	6	–	5
Maryland	2	–	6	4	–	7
Purdue	2	–	6	3	–	8
Rutgers	2	–	6	3	–	8
Michigan State	1	–	7	3	–	8
Championship: December 5, 2026
^ – College Football Playoff participant; $ – Conference champion; y – Championship game participant; As of November 22, 2026; Rankings from CFP rankings

2026 Big 12 Conference football standings
	Conf.			Overall
Team	W		L	W		L
No. 2 Utah y	8	–	0	11	–	0
No. 12 Texas Tech	7	–	1	10	–	1
No. 10 BYU	6	–	2	9	–	2
No. 19 Arizona	5	–	3	8	–	3
No. 20 Houston	5	–	3	8	–	3
Oklahoma State	5	–	3	7	–	4
Baylor	4	–	4	6	–	5
Arizona State	4	–	4	6	–	5
UCF	4	–	4	6	–	5
Iowa State	3	–	5	5	–	6
TCU	3	–	5	5	–	6
Cincinnati	3	–	5	6	–	5
Kansas	2	–	6	4	–	7
West Virginia	2	–	6	5	–	6
Colorado	2	–	6	4	–	7
Kansas State	1	–	7	4	–	7
Championship: TBD vs. Utah
^ – College Football Playoff participant; $ – Conference champion; y – Championship game participant; As of November 22, 2026; Rankings from CFP rankings

2026 Conference USA football standings
	Conf.			Overall
Team	W		L	W		L
Liberty y	7	–	0	10	–	1
Jacksonville State y	6	–	1	8	–	3
Delaware	4	–	3	6	–	5
Middle Tennessee	4	–	3	6	–	5
Kennesaw State	4	–	3	5	–	6
Missouri State	3	–	4	4	–	7
Western Kentucky	3	–	4	4	–	7
FIU	2	–	5	4	–	7
New Mexico State	2	–	5	3	–	8
Sam Houston	0	–	7	1	–	10
Championship: Jacksonville State at Liberty
y – Championship game participant; As of November 22, 2026; Rankings from AP poll

2026 Mid-American Conference football standings
	Conf.			Overall
Team	W		L	W		L
Ohio	6	–	1	8	–	3
Western Michigan	6	–	1	8	–	3
Buffalo	6	–	1	8	–	3
Toledo	6	–	1	9	–	2
Miami (OH)	5	–	2	7	–	4
Central Michigan	3	–	4	5	–	6
Eastern Michigan	3	–	4	4	–	7
Bowling Green	3	–	4	3	–	8
UMass	2	–	5	5	–	6
Kent State	2	–	5	3	–	8
Ball State	2	–	5	3	–	8
Akron	1	–	6	2	–	9
Sacramento State	1	–	7	2	–	9
Championship: December 5, 2026
As of November 22, 2026; Rankings from AP poll

2026 Mountain West Conference football standings
	Conf.			Overall
Team	W		L	W		L
New Mexico	6	–	1	9	–	2
North Dakota State	6	–	2	9	–	2
Wyoming	6	–	2	7	–	4
Air Force	5	–	2	9	–	2
UNLV	5	–	2	7	–	4
Nevada	4	–	3	5	–	6
San Jose State	3	–	5	5	–	7
Hawaii	2	–	6	3	–	8
UTEP	0	–	7	1	–	10
Northern Illinois	0	–	7	0	–	11
Championship: December 4, 2026
As of November 22, 2026; Rankings from CFP rankings

2026 Pac-12 Conference football standings
	Conf.			Overall
Team	W		L	W		L
No. 17 Boise State y	6	–	1	9	–	2
San Diego State y	5	–	2	6	–	5
Texas State	5	–	2	7	–	4
Oregon State	4	–	3	6	–	5
Utah State	3	–	4	4	–	7
Fresno State	3	–	4	6	–	5
Washington State	1	–	6	2	–	9
Colorado State	1	–	6	3	–	8
Championship: San Diego State at Boise State
y – Championship game participant; As of November 22, 2026; Rankings from CFP rankings

2026 Southeastern Conference football standings
	Conf.			Overall
Team	W		L	W		L
No. 1 Georgia y	8	–	1	10	–	1
No. 5 Texas	6	–	2	9	–	2
No. 9 Tennessee	6	–	2	9	–	2
No. 3 Alabama	6	–	2	9	–	2
No. 22 Oklahoma	5	–	3	7	–	4
No. 24 Florida	5	–	4	7	–	4
No. 16 Kentucky	5	–	4	7	–	4
No. 25 Ole Miss	4	–	4	7	–	4
Auburn	4	–	4	7	–	4
Missouri	4	–	4	7	–	4
No. 21 South Carolina	4	–	5	6	–	5
LSU	3	–	5	6	–	5
Mississippi State	2	–	6	5	–	6
Arkansas	2	–	6	4	–	7
Texas A&M	1	–	7	4	–	7
Vanderbilt	1	–	7	4	–	7
Championship: Georgia vs TBD
^ – College Football Playoff participant; $ – Conference champion; y – Championship game participant; As of November 22, 2026; Rankings from CFP rankings

2026 Sun Belt Conference football standings
	Conf.			Overall
Team	W		L	W		L
East Division
Georgia Southern	6	–	1	7	–	4
James Madison	5	–	2	8	–	3
Appalachian State	4	–	3	7	–	4
Coastal Carolina	3	–	4	4	–	7
Marshall	3	–	4	6	–	5
Georgia State	2	–	5	5	–	6
Old Dominion	2	–	5	3	–	8
West Division
Louisiana Tech xy	7	–	0	9	–	2
Louisiana	5	–	2	8	–	3
South Alabama	4	–	3	6	–	5
Arkansas State	2	–	5	4	–	7
Troy	2	–	5	4	–	7
Southern Miss	2	–	5	3	–	8
Louisiana–Monroe	2	–	5	2	–	9
Championship: TBD vs. Louisiana Tech
$ – Conference champion; x – Division champion/co-champions; y – Championship game participant; As of November 22, 2026; Rankings from AP poll

2026 NCAA Division I FBS independents football records
	Conf.			Overall
Team	W		L	W		L
No. 6 Notre Dame		–		10	–	1
UConn		–		6	–	5
As of November 22, 2026; Rankings from CFP rankings

== Rankings ==
The Top 25 from the AP and USA Today Coaches Polls

=== Preseason polls ===
Rank	Associated Press	Rank	Coaches' Poll
1	Ohio State (40)	1	Ohio State (38)
2	Oregon (14)	2	Oregon (6)
3	Georgia	3	Georgia (7)
4	Notre Dame (6)	4	Texas (2)
5	Texas	5	Notre Dame (5)
6	Indiana (8)	6	Indiana (14)
7	Miami (FL) (1)	7	Miami (FL)
8	Texas A&M	8	Texas A&M
9	Ole Miss	9	Oklahoma
10	Oklahoma	10	Ole Miss
11	LSU	11	Alabama
12	Texas Tech	12	Texas Tech
13	Alabama	13	LSU
14	BYUт	14	USC
14	USCт	15	BYU
16	Michigan	16	Michigan
17	Washington	17	Penn State
18	Penn State	18	Tennessee
19	SMU	19	Washington
20	Tennessee	20	SMU
21	Utah	21	Utah
22	Iowa	22	Iowa
23	Houston	23	Clemson
24	Louisville	24	Houston
25	Missouri	25	Missouri

=== CFB Playoff final rankings ===
The College Football Playoff (CFP) selection committee announced its final rankings on December 6, 2026.

The four Power Four conference champions plus the highest ranked Group of Six team, along with the seven highest ranked at-large teams, will be selected to compete in the College Football Playoff. This is a change from the 2025–26 season, when the five highest ranked conference champions earned an automatic bid regardless of what conference they were in. Another change from the previous season is that the Group of Six representative will be the highest-ranked team among that cohort, regardless of whether it was a conference champion. The top four ranked teams will receive first-round byes.

This is the first and only year that Notre Dame would receive an automatic bid if they were ranked in the top 12 during the final rankings.

Rank	Team	W–L	Conference and standing	Bowl game
1		0–0		
2		0–0		
3		0–0		
4		0–0		
5		0–0		
6		0–0		
7		0–0		
8		0–0		
9		0–0		
10		0–0		
11		0–0		
12		0–0		
13		0–0		
14		0–0		
15		0–0		
16		0–0		
17		0–0		
18		0–0		
19		0–0		
20		0–0		
21		0–0		
22		0–0		
23		0–0		
24		0–0		
25		0–0		

Unranked conference champions' bowl games
Rank	Team	W–L	Conference and standing	Bowl game
–		0–0		
–		0–0		
–		0–0		
–		0–0		

=== Final rankings ===
Rank	Associated Press	Coaches' Poll
1		
2		
3		
4		
5		
6		
7		
8		
9		
10		
11		
12		
13		
14		
15		
16		
17		
18		
19		
20		
21		
22		
23		
24		
25		

== Conference summaries ==
Rankings in this section are based on CFP rankings released prior to the games (Week 13 – December 1).

Note: Clicking on a link in the Conference column will open an article about that conference's championship game, where applicable.

=== Conference championship games ===
Conference	Power Four conference championship game				Players of the year				Coach of the year
Conference	Date	Venue (Location)	Matchup	Result	Overall/MVP	Offensive	Defensive	Special teams	Coach of the year
Big 12	Dec 4	AT&T Stadium (Arlington, Texas)	TBD vs Utah		—N/a				
ACC	Dec 5	Bank of America Stadium (Charlotte, North Carolina)	Miami vs Wake Forest				—N/a		
Big Ten	Dec 5	Lucas Oil Stadium (Indianapolis, Indiana)	TBD vs TBD		—N/a				
SEC	Dec 5	Mercedes-Benz Stadium (Atlanta, Georgia)	Georgia vs TBD		—N/a				

Conference	Group of Six conference championship game				Players of the year				Coach of the year
Conference	Date	Venue (Location)	Matchup	Result	Overall/MVP	Offensive	Defensive	Special teams	Coach of the year
Sun Belt	Dec 4	TBD (TBD)	TBD vs. Louisiana Tech		—N/a				
CUSA	Dec 4	Williams Stadium (Lynchburg, VA)	Jacksonville State at Liberty						
MW	Dec 4	TBD (TBD)	TBD vs TBD		—N/a				
Pac-12	Dec 4	Albertsons Stadium (Boise, ID)	San Diego State at Boise State		—N/a				
MAC	Dec 5	Ford Field (Detroit, Michigan)	TBD vs TBD						
American	Dec 5	TBD (TBD)	TBD at TBD					—N/a	

=== Conference champions' bowl games ===
For conference champions not part of the College Football Playoff.

Conference	Champion	W–L	Rank	Bowl game
American				—
CUSA				—
MAC			—	
Mountain West			—	
Pac-12			—	
Sun Belt				—

=== At-large bowl games ===
At-Large Teams
School	Conference	Record	Result	Bowl game

== Postseason ==
=== College Football Playoff ===
==== Playoff participants ====
Team	Conference	Record	Qualification method	College Football Playoff		
Team	Conference	Record	Qualification method	Appearance	Last bid	Result of last appearance

==== CFP bracket ====
This will be the third year under the expanded College Football Playoff format. Under changes applied this year, the four power conference champions will receiver automatic bids, with the highest ranked Group of 6 team receiving an automatic bid as well, regardless of whether or not they won their conference. The top four seeds will receive first-round byes, even if they are not conference champions. During the season, it was also announced that this would be the last year with a 12-team playoff as a 24-team expansion was agreed beginning in 2027, with conference championship games also making way.

First round (Dec 18–19); Campus sites
8
9
5
12
6
11
7
10

Quarterfinals (Dec 30–Jan 1); Fiesta/Rose/Cotton/Peach Bowls
1
4
3
2

Semifinals (Jan 14–15); Orange and Sugar Bowls

Championship
Jan 25 – Allegiant Stadium

Projected bracket based on Week 12 rankings

First round (Dec 18–19); Campus sites
Memorial Stadium
8	Indiana
9	Tennessee
Darrell K Royal–Texas Memorial Stadium
5	Texas
12	Boise State
Notre Dame Stadium
6	Notre Dame
11	Wake Forest
Hard Rock Stadium
7	Miami (FL)
10	BYU

Quarterfinals (Dec 30–Jan 1); Fiesta/Rose/Cotton/Peach Bowls
1	Georgia
4	UCLA
3	Alabama
2	Utah

Semifinals (Jan 14–15); Orange and Sugar Bowls

Championship
Jan 25 – Allegiant Stadium

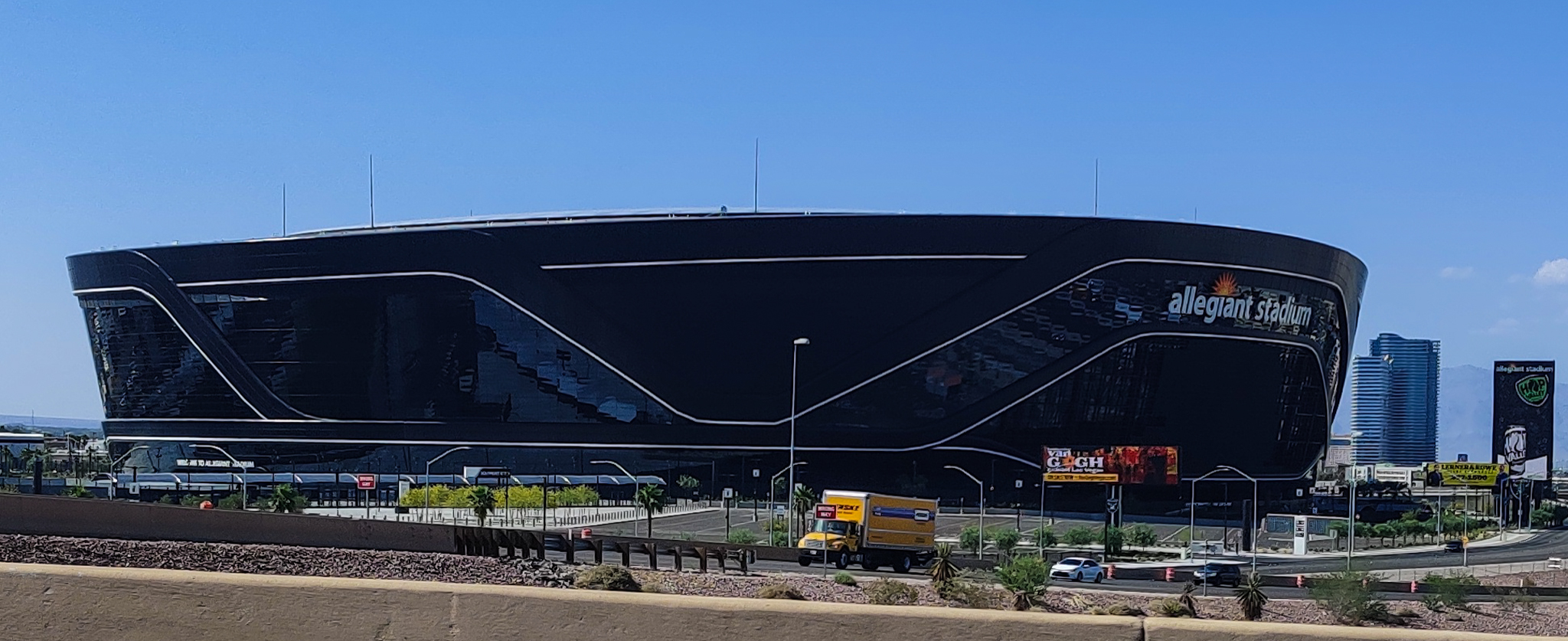
Allegiant Stadium in Paradise, Nevada, the site of the College Football Playoff National Championship.

Locations of the playoff games: campus site first round games (red), quarterfinals (orange), semifinals (yellow), and the national championship (green)

==== College Football Playoff games ====
Winners are listed in boldface.

After the completion of the regular season and conference championship games, five teams had secured CFP berths: ACC champion TBD, Big Ten champion TBD, Big 12 champion TBD, SEC champion TBD, and TBD, who qualified as the highest-ranked CFP non-AQ.

Bowl Game	Date	Visitor	Home	Score	TV
Non-bowl game (First round) (TBD – Campus site)	December 18				ESPN
Non-bowl game (First round) (TBD – Campus site)	December 19				ABC/ESPN
Non-bowl game (First round) (TBD – Campus site)	December 19				TNT/TruTV/TBS
Non-bowl game (First round) (TBD – Campus site)	December 19				TNT/TruTV/TBS
Vrbo Fiesta Bowl (Quarterfinals) (Glendale, AZ)	December 30				TNT/TruTV/TBS
Chick-fil-A Peach Bowl (Quarterfinals) (Atlanta, GA)	January 1				ABC/ESPN, ESPN or TNT/TruTV/TBS
Cotton Bowl Classic (Quarterfinals) (Arlington, TX)	January 1				ABC/ESPN, ESPN or TNT/TruTV/TBS
Rose Bowl Game presented by Prudential (Quarterfinals) (Pasadena, CA)	January 1				ABC/ESPN, ESPN or TNT/TruTV/TBS
Capital One Orange Bowl (Semifinals) (Miami Gardens, FL)	January 14				TNT/TruTV/TBS
Allstate Sugar Bowl (Semifinals) (New Orleans, LA)	January 15				ABC/ESPN
College Football Playoff National Championship Game (Las Vegas, NV)	January 25				ABC/ESPN

=== Bowl games ===
Normally, a team is required to have a .500 minimum winning percentage during the regular season to become bowl-eligible (six wins for an 11 or 12 game schedule and seven wins for a 13-game schedule). If there are not enough winning teams to fulfill all open bowl slots, teams with losing records may be chosen to fill available bowl slots. Additionally, on the rare occasion in which a conference champion does not meet eligibility requirements, they are usually still chosen for bowl games via tie-ins for their conference.

==== Non-CFP bowl games ====
Winners are listed in boldface.

The 2026–27 bowl season will have three fewer games than the previous year, as the LA Bowl, GameAbove Sports Bowl and the Bahamas Bowl will no longer be played.

===== New bowls =====
Two completely new bowls are planned to debut during the 2026–27 bowl season. A third bowl is set to return after a decade-long hiatus.

- The Puerto Rico Bowl (Bayamón, Puerto Rico) will be playing in December, for the first time.
- The San Juan Bowl (San Juan, Puerto Rico) will be playing in December, for the first time.
- The Poinsettia Bowl (San Diego, California) will return to being played in December after an absence of 10 years.

==== Non-CFP bowl schedules ====
The bowl games that are not part of the College Football Playoff are:

Bowl Game	Date	Visitor	Home	Score	TV
Salute to Veterans Bowl (Montgomery, AL)	December 15				ESPN
Frisco Football Classic (Frisco, TX)	December 15				ESPN
San Juan Bowl (San Juan, PR)	December 16				ESPN
Boca Raton Bowl (Boca Raton, FL)	December 18				ESPN
Gasparilla Bowl (Tampa, FL)	December 18				ESPN
Myrtle Beach Bowl (Conway, SC)	December 21				ESPN
Famous Idaho Potato Bowl (Boise, ID)	December 21				ESPN
Puerto Rico Bowl (Bayamón, PR)	December 22				ESPN
Cure Bowl (Orlando, FL)	December 22				ESPN
Independence Bowl (Shreveport, LA)	December 22				ESPN
R+L Carriers New Orleans Bowl (New Orleans, LA)	December 23				ESPN
Bell Helicopters Armed Forces Bowl (Fort Worth, TX)	December 23				ESPN
Frisco Bowl (Frisco, TX)	December 23				ESPN
Poinsettia Bowl (San Diego, CA)	December 23				The CW
New Mexico Bowl (Albuquerque, NM)	December 24				ESPN
Sheraton Hawaiʻi Bowl (Honolulu, HI)	December 24				ESPN
Pinstripe Bowl (Bronx, NY)	December 26				ABC
Fenway Bowl (Boston, MA)	December 26				ESPN
Duke’s Mayo Bowl (Charlotte, NC)	December 26				ABC
68 Ventures Bowl (Mobile, AL)	December 26				ESPN
Cactus Bowl (Tempe, AZ)	December 26				ABC
Military Bowl (Annapolis, MD)	December 28				ESPN
Holiday Bowl (San Diego, CA)	December 28				The CW
Birmingham Bowl (Birmingham, AL)	December 29				ESPN
Pop-Tarts Bowl (Orlando, FL)	December 29				ESPN
Valero Alamo Bowl (San Antonio, TX)	December 29				ESPN
Taxslayer Gator Bowl (Jacksonville, FL)	December 30				ESPN
Liberty Mutual Music City Bowl (Nashville, TN)	December 30				ESPN
ReliaQuest Bowl (Tampa, FL)	December 31				ESPN
Tony the Tiger Sun Bowl (El Paso, TX)	December 31				CBS
SRS Distribution Las Vegas Bowl (Paradise, NV)	December 31				ESPN
Texas Bowl (Houston, TX)	December 31				ESPN
Citrus Bowl (Orlando, FL)	January 2				ABC
First Responder Bowl (Dallas, TX)	January 2				ABC
AutoZone Liberty Bowl (Memphis, TN)	January 2				ABC
Arizona Bowl (Tucson, AZ)	January 2				The CW

=== Bowl Challenge Cup standings ===
CFP bowl games are denoted in bold type. First-round CFP playoff games are included, and denoted as CFP1.

Conference	Games			Wins–losses (pct.)	Bowls		
Conference	CFP	Other	Total	Wins–losses (pct.)	Won	Lost	Remaining
ACC				0–0 (–)			
American				0–0 (–)			
Big 12				0–0 (–)			
Big Ten				0–0 (–)			
CUSA				0–0 (–)			
MAC				0–0 (–)			
Mountain West				0–0 (–)			
Pac-12				0–0 (–)			
SEC				0–0 (–)			
Sun Belt				0–0 (–)			
Independent				0–0 (–)			

Berths to be determined:

Notes:

- As the playoff progresses, additional CFP berths will be added to this table.

=== Selection of teams ===
The below lists of teams are based on team records as published by the NCAA and bowl eligibility criteria.

==== Bowl-eligible teams ====
- ACC (10): Clemson, Duke, Louisville, Miami (FL), Pittsburgh, SMU, Stanford, Virginia, Virginia Tech, Wake Forest
- American (9): East Carolina, Florida Atlantic, Memphis, North Texas, South Florida, Tulane, Tulsa, UAB, UTSA
- Big Ten (14): Illinois, Indiana, Iowa, Michigan, Minnesota, Nebraska, Northwestern, Ohio State, Oregon, Penn State, UCLA, USC, Washington, Wisconsin
- Big 12 (10): Arizona, Arizona State, Baylor, BYU, Cincinnati, Houston, Oklahoma State, Texas Tech, UCF, Utah
- CUSA (4): Delaware, Jacksonville State, Liberty, Middle Tennessee
- MAC (5): Buffalo, Miami (OH), Ohio, Toledo, Western Michigan
- Mountain West (5): Air Force, New Mexico, North Dakota State, UNLV, Wyoming
- Pac-12 (5): Boise State, Fresno State, Oregon State, San Diego State, Texas State
- SEC (12): Alabama, Auburn, Florida, Georgia, Kentucky, LSU, Missouri, Oklahoma, Ole Miss, South Carolina, Tennessee, Texas
- SBC (7): Appalachian State, Georgia Southern, James Madison, Louisiana, Louisiana Tech, Marshall, South Alabama
- Independent (2): Notre Dame, UConn

Number of postseason berths available: 84
Number of bowl-eligible teams: 83

==== Bowl-ineligible teams ====
- ACC (2): California, Georgia Tech
- American (4): Charlotte, Navy (Note: Since the Army–Navy Game does not take place until after the bowl selection date, Navy became bowl ineligible with six losses), Rice, Temple
- Big Ten (4): Maryland, Michigan State, Purdue, Rutgers
- Big 12 (3): Colorado, Kansas, Kansas State
- CUSA (5): FIU, Missouri State, New Mexico State, Sam Houston, Western Kentucky
- MAC (7): Akron, Ball State, Bowling Green, Eastern Michigan, Kent State, Sacramento State, UMass (Note: UMass has two wins against FCS schools. As only one win against an FCS school may be counted toward bowl eligibility, UMass became bowl ineligible with six loses)
- Mountain West (4): Hawaii, Northern Illinois, San Jose State, UTEP
- Pac-12 (3): Colorado State, Utah State, Washington State
- SEC (3): Arkansas, Texas A&M, Vanderbilt
- SBC (6): Arkansas State, Coastal Carolina, Louisiana–Monroe, Old Dominion, Southern Miss, Troy

Number of bowl-ineligible teams: 41

== Awards and honors ==
=== Heisman Trophy voting ===
The Heisman Trophy is given to the year's most outstanding player

Player	School	Position	1st	2nd	3rd	Total

=== Major award winners ===
Award	Winner	Position	School
AP Player of the Year			
Maxwell Award (college football player of the year)			
Walter Camp Award (top back)			
Davey O'Brien Award (quarterback)		QB	
SN Player of the Year			
Johnny Unitas Golden Arm Award (upperclass quarterback)		QB	
Doak Walker Award (running back)		RB	
Fred Biletnikoff Award (wide receiver)		WR	
John Mackey Award (tight end)		TE	
Rimington Trophy (center)		C	
Outland Trophy (interior lineman)		OT	
Bronko Nagurski Trophy (defensive player)			
Chuck Bednarik Award (defensive player)			
Dick Butkus Award (linebacker)			
Lombardi Award (top lineman)			
Lott Trophy (defensive impact)			
Jim Thorpe Award (defensive back)			
Lou Groza Award (placekicker)		PK	
Ray Guy Award (punter)		P	
AFCA Coach of the Year		HC	
AP Coach of the Year		HC	
Home Depot Coach of the Year		HC	
Walter Camp Coach of the Year		HC	
Eddie Robinson Coach of the Year		HC	
Bobby Dodd Coach of the Year		HC	
George Munger Award		HC	
Paul "Bear" Bryant Award		HC	
AFCA Assistant Coach of the Year			
Broyles Award			

==== Other major award winners ====
Award	Winner	Position	School
Manning Award		QB	
Burlsworth Trophy (top player who began as walk-on)			
Paul Hornung Award (most versatile player)			
Polynesian Football Player of the Year Award (top Polynesian player)			
Jon Cornish Trophy (top Canadian player)			
Campbell Trophy ("academic Heisman")			
Academic All-American of the Year			
Wuerffel Trophy (humanitarian-athlete)			
Joe Moore Award			
Ted Hendricks Award		DE	
Jet Award		RS	
Patrick Mannelly Award		LS	

=== All-Americans ===
The following players were recognized as consensus All-Americans for 2026. Unanimous selections are followed by an asterisk (*).

2026 Consensus All-Americans
Name	Position	Year	University
	Quarterback		
	Running back		
	Wide receiver		
	Tight end		
	Offensive Line		
	Defensive line		
	Linebacker		
	Defensive back		
	Kicker		
	Punter		
	All-purpose, return specialist		

== Coaching changes ==
=== Preseason and in-season ===
This is restricted to coaching changes taking place on or after May 1, 2026, and will include any changes announced after a team's last regularly scheduled game before its bowl game. For coaching changes that occurred earlier in 2026, see 2025 NCAA Division I FBS end-of-season coaching coaches.

School	Outgoing Coach	Date	Reason	Contract Buyout	Replacement	Source
Maryland	Mike Locksley	October 21, 2026	Fired	NA	Aazaar Abdul-Rahim (interim)	
NC State	Dave Doeren	October 24, 2026	Fired	$10.3 million	Todd Goebbel (interim)	
Baylor	Dave Aranda	October 25, 2026	Fired	$12 million	Joe Klanderman (interim)	
Sam Houston	Phil Longo	October 28, 2026	Fired		Eric Raisbeck; Freddie Aughtry-Lindsay (interim co-head coaches)	
Florida State	Mike Norvell	November 1, 2026	Fired	$50.3 million	Rick Stockstill (interim)	
UTEP	Scotty Walden	November 16, 2026	Fired		Kyle Beyer (interim)	
Arkansas State	Butch Jones	November 17, 2026	Fired		Jalen Ortiz (interim)	
TCU	Sonny Dykes	November 22, 2026	Fired	$20 million	Andy Avalos (interim)	

=== End of season ===
The list includes coaching changes announced during the season that will not take effect until the end of the season.

School	Outgoing coach	Date	Reason	Replacement	Previous position
NC State	Todd Goebbel (interim)	November 13, 2026	Permanent replacement	Philip Rivers	St. Michael Catholic HS (AL) head coach

== Television viewers and ratings ==
=== Top 10 most watched regular season games ===
All times Eastern. Rankings are from the AP Poll (before 11/4) and CFP Rankings (thereafter).

Rank	Date	Time	Matchup				Network	Viewers (millions)	Location	Significance
1	September 12, 2026	7:30 p.m.	No. 1 Ohio State	23	No. 4 Texas	24	ABC	13.99	Darrell K Royal-Texas Memorial Stadium; Austin, TX	College GameDay
2	October 10, 2026	7:30 p.m.	No. 2 Georgia	20	No. 6 Alabama	17	ABC	12.24	Bryant-Denny Stadium; Tuscaloosa, AL	Rivalry, College GameDay
3	September 19, 2026	7:30 p.m.	No. 7 LSU	24	No. 8 Ole Miss	32	ABC	10.90	Vaught-Hemingway Stadium; Oxford, MS	Rivalry, College GameDay
4	October 17, 2026	12:00 p.m.	No. 4 Ohio State	19	No. 5 Indiana	15	FOX	10.38	Memorial Stadium (Indiana University); Bloomington, IN	Big Noon Kickoff
5	October 10, 2026	3:30 p.m.	No. 1 Texas	24	Oklahoma	27	ABC	9.82	Cotton Bowl Stadium; Dallas, TX	Rivalry
6	September 26, 2026	12:00 p.m.	No. 1 Texas	20	No. 14 Tennessee	17	ABC	9.75	Neyland Stadium; Knoxville, TN	College GameDay
7	October 17, 2026	7:30 p.m.	No. 2 Notre Dame	24	No. 8 BYU	28	ABC	9.16	LaVell Edwards Stadium; Provo, UT	College GameDay
8	November 7, 2026	7:30 p.m.	No. 1 Miami	24	No. 11 Notre Dame	31	NBC	9.1	Notre Dame Stadium; Notre Dame, IN	College GameDay
9	November 14, 2026	7:30 p.m.	No. 6 Texas	22	No. 21 LSU	21	ABC	9.06	Tiger Stadium (LSU); Baton Rouge, LA	
10	November 7, 2026	3:30 p.m.	No. 5 Alabama	31	No. 14 LSU	13	ABC	8.86	Tiger Stadium (LSU); Baton Rouge, LA	Rivalry

=== Conference championship games ===
All times Eastern. Rankings are from the CFP Rankings.

Rank	Date	Time	Matchup		Network	Viewers (millions)	Conference	Location	Attendance
	December 4	7:00 p.m.	Jacksonville State	Liberty	CBSSN		CUSA	Williams Stadium; Lynchburg, VA	
	December 4	7:00 p.m.		Louisiana Tech	ESPN		Sun Belt	TBD; TBD	
	December 4	8:00 p.m.			ABC		Big 12	AT&T Stadium, Arlington, TX	
	December 4	8:00 p.m.	San Diego State	Boise State	CBS		Pac-12	Albertsons Stadium; Boise, ID	
	December 4	9:00 p.m.			FOX		MW	TBD; TBD	
	December 5	12:00 p.m.			ESPN		MAC	Ford Field, Detroit, MI	
	December 5	12:00 p.m.	Miami	Wake Forest	ABC		ACC	Bank of America Stadium, Charlotte, NC	
	December 5	4:00 p.m.		Georgia	ABC		SEC	Mercedes-Benz Stadium, Atlanta, GA	
	December 5	8:00 p.m.			ABC		American	TBD; TBD	
	December 5	8:00 p.m.			FOX		Big Ten	Lucas Oil Stadium, Indianapolis, IN	

=== Most watched non-CFP bowl games ===
All times Eastern. Rankings are from the CFP Rankings.

Rank	Date	Time	Matchup	Network	Viewers (millions)	Game	Location	Attendance

=== College Football Playoff games ===
Rank	Date	Time	Matchup	Network	Viewers (millions)	Game	Location	Attendance
	December 18	8:00 pm (ET)		ESPN		Non-bowl game (First round)	TBD; TBD (Campus site)	
	December 19	12:00 pm (ET)		ABC/ESPN		Non-bowl game (First round)	TBD; TBD (Campus site)	
	December 19	3:30 pm (ET)		TNT		Non-bowl game (First round)	TBD; TBD (Campus site)	
	December 19	7:30 pm (ET)		TNT		Non-bowl game (First round)	TBD; TBD (Campus site)	
	December 30	7:30 pm (ET)		TNT		Fiesta Bowl (Quarterfinals)	State Farm Stadium; Glendale, Arizona	
	January 1	TBD (ET)		ABC/ESPN/TNT		Peach Bowl (Quarterfinals)	Mercedes-Benz Stadium; Atlanta, Georgia	
	January 1	TBD (ET)		ABC/ESPN/TNT		Cotton Bowl Classic (Quarterfinals)	AT&T Stadium; Arlington, Texas	
	January 1	TBD (ET)		ABC/ESPN/TNT		Rose Bowl (Quarterfinals)	Rose Bowl; Pasadena, California	
	January 14	7:30 pm (ET)		TNT		Orange Bowl (Semifinals)	Hard Rock Stadium; Miami Gardens, Florida	
	January 15	7:30 pm (ET)		ABC/ESPN		Sugar Bowl (Semifinals)	Caesars Superdome; New Orleans, Louisiana	
	January 25	7:30 pm (ET)		ABC/ESPN		College Football Playoff National Championship	Allegiant Stadium; Las Vegas, Nevada	

== Television changes ==
The Pac-12 Conference began a new five-year broadcast agreement with CBS Sports, CW Sports, and USA Sports. CBS is carrying 15 regular season games, three on CBS and the rest on CBS Sports Network, and the conference championship game. The CW is airing 13 regular season games and USA is carrying 22 games. All games are produced by Pac-12 Enterprises.

The Mountain West Conference also began a new six-year broadcast agreement with Fox Sports, CBS Sports, and The CW. Fox retains the broadcast rights to the conference championship game and carries 12 regular season games across Fox, FS1, and FS2. CBS is carrying 15 regular season games, at least one game airing on CBS and the rest on CBS Sports Network, and The CW is airing 13 regular season games as well. Additionally, the conference has partnered with internet video company Kiswe to create a new direct-to-consumer streaming service which is carrying the remaining games on its schedule.

The CW also reached agreements to add coverage of the Holiday Bowl, previously on Fox, and the Poinsettia Bowl.

After 15 years on Spectrum Sports, the University of Hawaiʻi at Mānoa began a new, four-year agreement with Gray Media-owned Hawaii News Now, which saw the school's football games shift from a pay-per-view subscription-based model, which the school had abandoned last season, to free, over-the-air television. Games primarily air on KFVE locally and on the aforementioned Mountain West direct-to-consumer streaming service nationally. KFVE had previously served as the school's official broadcaster from 1994 to 2011.

== See also ==
- 2026 NCAA Division I FCS football season
- 2026 NCAA Division II football season
- 2026 NCAA Division III football season
- 2026 NAIA football season
- 2026 U Sports football season
- 2026 junior college football season
