= Group of Six conferences =

Group of athletic conferences in college football

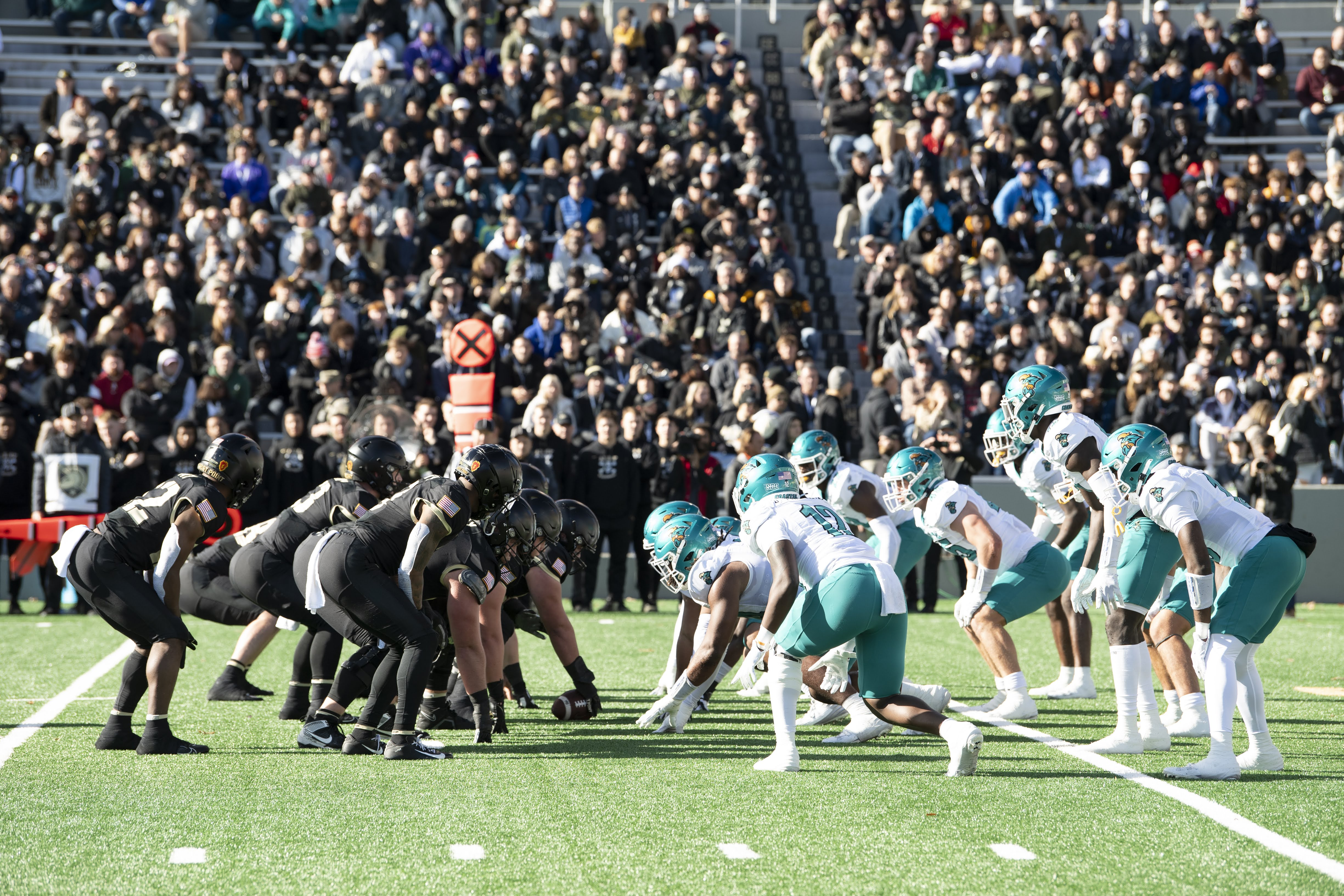
A game between Army and Coastal Carolina in 2023; both teams are members of their respective group conferences, the American and the Sun Belt

In college football, the Group of Six conferences (G6), also known as group conferences, are the six athletic conferences whose members are part of the National Collegiate Athletic Association's (NCAA) Division I Football Bowl Subdivision (FBS) who are not counted amongst the power conferences, who are granted a degree of autonomy from certain NCAA rules. In collegiate sports other than football, the conferences are collectively known (along with the entirety of the Championship Subdivision and the Division I colleges who do not sponsor varsity football) as mid-majors.

The five original conferences, known as the Group of Five conferences (G5), are the American Conference (American), Conference USA (CUSA), Mid-American Conference (MAC), Mountain West Conference (MW) and Sun Belt Conference (SBC). The Pac-12 Conference – which was formerly a power conference – is considered to be a de facto member of the group since a realignment in the early 2020s saw it lose its autonomy status after all but two of its original members left for other power conferences. In addition, two schools compete in FBS as without affiliation in football, but only one of them (UConn) is considered part of the group.

The group conferences and their schools are generally considered less prestigious, have less political and financial influence, and generate less overall revenue; a 2016 ESPN analysis found the conferences generated a third of the revenue that the power conferences did. As a result, the conferences are perceived to have a lower quality of play, although their teams are known to cause upsets.

Between 2014 and 2023, at least one group team was guaranteed access to one of the New Year's Six bowl games. In 2021, the American's Cincinnati Bearcats were the first team to play in the College Football Playoff (CFP), and were the only team to do so under its four-team format. Beginning in 2024 season, at least one group conference champion is effectively guaranteed entry to the College Football Playoff under the expanded 12-team format. During the 2025 season, for the first time, two G6 teams (Tulane and JMU, who had recently made the move up from the FCS a few years prior) made the College Football Playoff.

== Current conferences and teams ==
The ten current FBS conferences are listed below. For the group conferences, the football members of each conference are also listed. (Note: As of the 2026–27 school year, three Group of Six conferences have one full member that does not have a football team: Gonzaga in the Pac-12, Grand Canyon in the Mountain West, and Wichita State in the American. The MW also has football-sponsoring UC Davis as a full member, but without its football team, which remains in Division I FCS for the immediate future.)

Group of Six conferences (as of 2026 season)
American		Conference USA		Mid-American		Mountain West		Pac-12		Sun Belt	
American		Conference USA		Mid-American		Mountain West		Pac-12		West Division	East Division
Army	Rice	Delaware	Middle Tennessee	Akron	Miami (OH)	Air Force	Northern Illinois	Boise State	San Diego State	Arkansas State	Appalachian State
Charlotte	South Florida	FIU	Missouri State	Ball State	Ohio	Hawaii	San Jose State	Colorado State	Texas State	Louisiana	Coastal Carolina
East Carolina	Temple	Jacksonville State	New Mexico State	Bowling Green	Sacramento State	Nevada	UNLV	Fresno State	Utah State	Louisiana–Monroe	Georgia Southern
Florida Atlantic	Tulane	Kennesaw State	Sam Houston	Buffalo	Toledo	New Mexico	UTEP	Oregon State	Washington State	Louisiana Tech	Georgia State
Memphis	Tulsa	Liberty	Western Kentucky	Central Michigan	Western Michigan	North Dakota State	Wyoming			South Alabama	James Madison (Note: James Madison will be joining the American starting the 2027 season.)
Navy	UAB			Eastern Michigan	UMass					Southern Miss	Marshall
North Texas	UTSA			Kent State						Troy	Old Dominion

Power conferences
Atlantic Coast Conference (Note: Notre Dame is the only independent that is not included with the group conferences. It is a currently a non-football member of the ACC, and has an agreement with the conference to play five games a season against its members in exchange for bowl access.)
Big Ten Conference
Big 12 Conference
Southeastern Conference

Independent teams
Notre Dame
UConn

== Map of Group of Six teams ==
2026 Map of Group of Six Teams
This map shows Group of Six teams during the 2026 season. Colors indicate conference membership: American (blue), CUSA (red), MAC (green), Mountain West (purple), Pac-12 (black), Sun Belt (orange), and Group of Six independent (grey). Shown in the bottom map is Hawaii of the Mountain West.

Group of Six conferences (Hawaii)
