= 2026 Boise State Broncos football team =

American college football season

2026 Boise State Broncos football

Pac-12 Championship Game, vs. San Diego State
- Conference: Pac-12 Conference

Ranking
- Coaches: No. 15
- AP: No. 15
- CFP: No. 17
- Record: 9–2 (6–1 Pac-12)
- Head coach: Spencer Danielson (3rd season)
- Offensive coordinator: Nate Potter (3rd season)
- Co-offensive coordinator: Zak Hill (5th season)
- Offensive scheme: Pro spread
- Defensive coordinator: Erik Chinander (3rd season)
- Co-defensive coordinator: Terrence Brown (1st season)
- Base defense: 4–2–5
- Home stadium: Albertsons Stadium

2026 Pac-12 Conference football standings
	Conf.			Overall
Team	W		L	W		L
No. 17 Boise State y	6	–	1	9	–	2
San Diego State y	5	–	2	6	–	5
Texas State	5	–	2	7	–	4
Oregon State	4	–	3	6	–	5
Utah State	3	–	4	4	–	7
Fresno State	3	–	4	6	–	5
Washington State	1	–	6	2	–	9
Colorado State	1	–	6	3	–	8
Championship: San Diego State at Boise State
y – Championship game participant; As of November 22, 2026; Rankings from CFP rankings

The 2026 Boise State Broncos football team represents Boise State University as a member of the Pac-12 Conference during the 2026 NCAA Division I FBS football season. The team is led by third-year head coach Spencer Danielson, and play home games on campus at Albertsons Stadium in Boise, Idaho.

This is the Broncos' first season in the Pac-12.

== Offseason ==
=== Transfers ===
==== Outgoing ====
Player	Position	Destination
Chris Marshall	WR	Arkansas
Chase Martin	LB	Cal Poly
Roland Podesta	P	Coastal Carolina
Ty Benefield	S	LSU
Jambres Dubar	RB	Missouri State
Hayden Hanks	EDGE	Montana
Jaylen Webb	S	Nevada
Clay Martineau	LB	New Mexico
Tyler Keinath	IOL	New Mexico State
Ja'Bree Bickham	S	North Texas
Kaleb Annett	QB	UCF
Hall Schmidt	OT	UCLA
Greg Ard	RB	UT Martin
Davon Banks	CB	Unknown
Austin Bolt	WR	Unknown
Kayden Chan	WR	Unknown
Seth Knothe	RB	Unknown
Eyitayo Omotinugbon	IOL	Unknown
Jarrett Reeser	P	Unknown
JJ Talo	IOL	Unknown
Demetric Whitlock Jr.	WR	Unknown

==== Incoming ====
Player	Position	Previous School
Mikaio Edwards	DL	Central Washington
Tyler Ethridge	OT	CSU Pueblo
Logan Brantley	LB	Kansas
Harry Stewart III	RB	Kansas
JeRico Washington Jr.	CB	Kennesaw State
Taebron Bennie-Powell	S	Notre Dame
Zander Esty	IOL	Oregon State
Juelz Goff	RB	Pittsburgh
Roman Tillmon	S	South Dakota
Darren Morris	WR	Southern
Cam Jamerson	CB	TCU
Caden Kellow	LS	Weber State

== Preseason ==
Spring practice is scheduled to begin on March 26, culminating with the spring game on April 25.

== Schedule ==
Date	Time	Opponent	Rank	Site	TV	Result	Attendance
September 5	1:30 p.m.	at No. 2 Oregon*		Autzen Stadium; Eugene, OR	CBS	L 27–34	57,652
September 12	4:00 p.m.	Memphis*		Albertsons Stadium; Boise, ID	USA	W 38–20	34,439
September 19	8:00 p.m.	No. 10 (FCS) South Dakota*		Albertsons Stadium; Boise, ID	CBSSN	W 38–24	34,428
September 26	1:30 p.m.	at Western Michigan*		Waldo Stadium; Kalamazoo, MI	ESPN2	W 32–7	29,700
October 3	5:30 p.m.	Utah State	No. 22	Albertsons Stadium; Boise, ID	CBSSN	W 37–18	34,616
October 10	8:30 p.m.	at Fresno State	No. 23	Valley Children's Stadium; Fresno, CA (rivalry)	The CW	W 38–31	43,086
October 24	4:00 p.m.	at Washington State	No. 21	Martin Stadium; Pullman, WA	USA	W 31–10	27,300
October 31	8:00 p.m.	Texas State	No. 20т	Albertsons Stadium; Boise, ID	The CW	W 46–45	34,329
November 7	4:00 p.m.	at Colorado State	No. 25	Canvas Stadium; Fort Collins, CO	USA	W 64–38	30,587
November 14	4:00 p.m.	Oregon State	No. 24	Albertsons Stadium; Boise, ID (College GameDay)	USA	W 46–41	35,084
November 21	7:30 p.m.	San Diego State	No. 17	Albertsons Stadium; Boise, ID	USA	L 20–22	34,430
November 28	3:00 p.m.	at Colorado State (Note: In the 2026 season, the Pac-12 will use a "flex" scheduling model for Week 13. After the round-robin conference schedule, the conference will determine the pairings for Week 13. "Flex" games will not count in the conference standings.)*		Canvas Stadium; Fort Collins, CO	USA		
December 4	6:00 p.m.	San Diego State		Albertsons Stadium; Boise, ID (Pac-12 Championship Game)	CBS		
*Non-conference game; Rankings from AP Poll (and CFP Rankings, after November 3) – Released prior to game; All times are in Mountain time; Source:

== Rankings ==
Ranking movements Legend: ██ Increase in ranking ██ Decrease in ranking RV = Received votes т = Tied with team above or below
	Week															
Poll	Pre	1	2	3	4	5	6	7	8	9	10	11	12	13	14	Final
AP	RV	RV	RV	RV	22	23	23	21	20т	20	17	15				
Coaches	RV	RV	RV	RV	RV	RV	24	22	22	21	18	15				
CFP	Not released									25	24	17				Not released

== Game summaries ==
=== at No. 2 Oregon ===
Boise State Broncos (0–0) at No. 2 Oregon Ducks (0–0) – Game summary

Quarter	1	2	3	4	Total
Broncos	7	10	7	3	27
No. 2 Ducks	0	14	10	10	34

at Autzen Stadium • Eugene, Oregon

- Date: September 5
- Game time: 1:30 PM MDT
- Game weather: Sunny
- Game attendance: 57,652
- Referee: Jeff Servinski
- TV announcers (CBS): Brad Nessler (play-by-play), Charles Davis (analyst), and Jenny Dell (sideline reporter)

Game information

First quarter

- BOIS – Cam Bates 13-yard pass from Maddux Madsen (Canaan Moore kick), 8:37. Broncos 7–0. Drive: 11 plays, 75 yards, 6:23.

Second quarter

- ORE – Jordon Davison 1-yard run (Gage Hurych kick), 11:17. Tied 7–7. Drive: 8 plays, 50 yards, 3:37.
- BOIS – Sire Gaines 38-yard pass from Maddux Madsen (Canaan Moore kick), 10:14. Broncos 14–7. Drive: 1 play, 38 yards, 0:10.
- BOIS – Canaan Moore 29-yard field goal, 2:48. Broncos 17–7. Drive: 9 plays, 42 yards, 4:42.
- ORE – Jamari Johnson 27-yard pass from Dante Moore (Gage Hurych kick), 0:19. Broncos 17–14. Drive: 4 plays, 44 yards, 0:43.

Third quarter

- ORE – Gage Hurych 26-yard field goal, 11:30. Tied 17–17. Drive: 8 plays, 67 yards, 3:30.
- ORE – Jeremiah McClellan 8-yard pass from Dante Moore (Gage Hurych kick), 5:36. Ducks 24–17. Drive: 6 plays, 87 yards, 3:13.
- BOIS – Matt Wagner 7-yard pass from Maddux Madsen (Canaan Moore kick), 1:20. Tied 24–24. Drive: 8 plays, 75 yards, 4:16.

Fourth quarter

- ORE – Gage Hurych 44-yard field goal, 14:49. Ducks 27–24. Drive: 5 plays, 50 yards, 1:31.
- BOIS – Canaan Moore 36-yard field goal, 8:45. Tied 27–27. Drive: 11 plays, 57 yards, 6:04.
- ORE – Dakorien Moore 62-yard pass from Dante Moore (Gage Hurych kick), 7:51. Ducks 34–27. Drive: 2 plays, 71 yards, 0:54.

Statistics	BOIS	ORE
First downs	18	18
Plays–yards	65–274	63–497
Rushes–yards	36–93	25–119
Passing yards	181	378
Passing: Comp–Att–Int	15–29–0	28–38–0
Turnovers	0	1
Time of possession	31:54	28:06

Team	Category	Player	Statistics
Boise State	Passing	Maddux Madsen	15/29, 181 yards, 3 TD
Boise State	Rushing	Dylan Riley	17 carries, 50 yards
Boise State	Receiving	Rasean Jones	4 receptions, 76 yards
Oregon	Passing	Dante Moore	28/37, 378 yards, 3 TD
Oregon	Rushing	Jordon Davison	12 carries, 90 yards, TD
Oregon	Receiving	Jeremiah McClellan	6 receptions, 150 yards, TD

=== Memphis ===
Memphis Tigers (2–0) at Boise State Broncos (0–1) – Game summary

Quarter	1	2	3	4	Total
Tigers	7	13	0	0	20
Broncos	3	14	14	7	38

at Albertsons Stadium • Boise, Idaho

- Date: September 12
- Game time: 4:00 PM MDT
- Game weather: Sunny
- Game attendance: 34,439
- Referee: Chris Snead
- TV announcers (USA): Nate Gatter, Ryan Leaf and Lauren Green

Game information

First quarter

- BOIS – Canaan Moore 39-yard pass field goal, 9:37. Broncos 3–0. Drive: 12 plays, 53 yards, 5:23.
- MEM - Hunter Tipton 87-yard pass from Marcus Stokes (Philippe Laforge kick), 2:14. Tigers 7-3. Drive: 2 plays, 87 yards, 0:20.

Second quarter

- MEM – Philippe Laforge 33-yard field goal, 9:33. Tigers 10–3. Drive: 6 plays, 83 yards, 2:53.
- MEM – Jaylin Carter 80-yard pass run (Philippe Laforge kick), 7:10. Tigers 17–3. Drive: 1 play, 80 yards, 0:13.
- BOIS – Akeem Wright 37-yard pass from Maddux Madsen (Canaan Moore kick), 2:28. Tigers 17–10. Drive: 8 plays, 75 yards, 4:42.
- BOIS – Rasean Jones 19-yard run (Canaan Moore kick), 1:07. Tied 17–17. Drive: 2 plays, 90 yards, 0:46.
- MEM - Philippe Laforge 36-yard field goal, 0:00. Tigers 20-17. Drive: 7 plays, 57 yards, 1:07.

Third quarter

- BOIS – Sire Gaines 11-yard run (Canaan Moore kick), 8:06. Broncos 24-20. Drive: 10 plays, 77 yards, 4:53.
- BOIS – Cam Bates 72-yard punt return (Canaan Moore kick), 6:27. Broncos 31–20. Drive: 3 plays, 4 yards, 1:39.

Fourth quarter

- BOIS – Maddux Madsen 1-yard run (Canaan Moore kick), 13:30. Broncos 38–20. Drive: 10 plays, 98 yards, 5:30.

Statistics	MEM	BOIS
First downs	17	28
Plays–yards	52–519	75–578
Rushes–yards	26–135	47–357
Passing yards	384	221
Passing: comp–att–int	17–26–1	17–28–0
Turnovers	1	0
Time of possession	20:04	39:56

Team	Category	Player	Statistics
Memphis	Passing	Marcus Stokes	17/25, 384 yards, TD, INT
Memphis	Rushing	Jaylin Carter	9 carries, 95 yards, TD
Memphis	Receiving	Hunter Tipton	9 receptions, 229 yards, TD
Boise State	Passing	Maddux Madsen	17/28, 221 yards, TD
Boise State	Rushing	Dylan Riley	19 carries, 206 yards
Boise State	Receiving	Akeem Wright	4 receptions, 84 yards, TD

=== No. 10 (FCS) South Dakota ===
No. 10 (FCS) South Dakota Coyotes (3–0) at Boise State Broncos (1–1) – Game summary

Quarter	1	2	3	4	Total
No. 10 (FCS) Coyotes	7	7	7	3	24
Broncos	7	14	3	14	38

at Albertsons Stadium • Boise, Idaho

- Date: September 19
- Game time: 8:00 PM MDT
- Game weather: Clear • Temperature: 73 °F (23 °C) • Wind: W at 5 miles per hour (8.0 km/h)
- Game attendance: 34,428
- Referee: Preston Clipper
- TV announcers (CBSSN): Chris Lewis, Randy Cross and Brandon Baylor

Game information

First quarter

- SDAK - Bryce Cohoon 16-yard pass from Austyn Modrzewski (Bohdie Ing kick), 8:29. Coyotes 7-0. Drive: 1 play, 16 yards, 0:07.
- BOIS - Rasean Jones 9-yard pass from Maddux Madsen (Canaan Moore kick), 0:04. Tied 7-7. Drive: 9 plays, 65 yards, 3:52.

Second quarter

- SDAK - Tysen Boze 5-yard pass from Austyn Modrzewski (Bohdie Ing kick), 13:39. Coyotes 14-7. Drive: 3 plays, 75 yards, 1:25.
- BOIS - Sire Gaines 3-yard run (Canaan Moore kick), 7:41. Tied 14-14. Drive: 12 plays, 70 yards, 5:49.
- BOIS - Cam Bates 4-yard pass from Maddux Madsen (Canaan Moore kick), 2:04. Broncos 21-14. Drive: 9 plays, 70 yards, 4:53.

Third quarter

- BOIS - Canaan Moore 38-yard field goal, 8:33. Broncos 24-14. Drive: 11 plays, 54 yards, 6:27.
- SDAK - Tysen Boze 59-yard pass from Austyn Modrzewski (Bohdie Ing kick), 2:49. Broncos 24-21. Drive: 3 plays, 55 yards, 1:17.

Fourth quarter

- SDAK - Bohdie Ing 43-yaard field goal, 10:33. Tied 24-24. Drive: 5 plays, 51 yards, 2:17.
- BOIS - Dylan Riley 2-yard run (Canaan Moore kick), 6:25. Broncos 31-24. Drive: 9 plays, 75 yards, 4:08.
- BOIS - Dylan Riley 83-yard run (Canaan Moore kick), 1:33. Broncos 38-24. Drive: 1 play, 83 yards, 0:11.

Statistics	SDAK	BOIS
First downs	11	29
Plays–yards	50–279	79–533
Rushes–yards	22–36	48–325
Passing yards	243	208
Passing: comp–att–int	12–28–2	22–31–0
Turnovers	2	2
Time of possession	20:34	39:26

Team	Category	Player	Statistics
South Dakota	Passing	Austyn Modrzewski	12/27, 243 yards, 3 TD, 2 INT
South Dakota	Rushing	Charles Pierre Jr.	14 carries, 47 yards
South Dakota	Receiving	Tennel Bryant	3 receptions, 104 yards
Boise State	Passing	Maddux Madsen	22/31, 208 yards, 2 TD
Boise State	Rushing	Dylan Riley	26 carries, 198 yards, 2 TD
Boise State	Receiving	Rasean Jones	8 receptions, 95 yards, TD

=== at Western Michigan ===
Boise State Broncos (2–1) at Western Michigan Broncos (2–1) – Game summary

Quarter	1	2	3	4	Total
Boise State	8	7	10	7	32
Western Michigan	0	0	0	7	7

at Waldo Stadium • Kalamazoo, Michigan

- Date: September 26
- Game time: 1:30 p.m. MDT
- Game weather: Sunny • Temperature: 70 °F (21 °C) • Wind: NE at 5 miles per hour (8.0 km/h)
- Game attendance: 29,700
- Referee: Rick Warne
- TV announcers (ESPN2): Jay Alter, Tom Luginbill and Lauren Sisler

Game information

First quarter

- BOIS - Matt Wagner 34-yard pass from Maddux Madsen (Zeke Martinez run for two-point conversion), 11:33. Boise State Broncos 8-0. Drive: 7 plays, 75 yards, 3:27.

Second quarter

- BOIS - Dylan Riley 5-yard run (Canaan Moore kick), 7:33. Boise State Broncos 15-0. Drive: 15 plays, 78 yards, 7:51.

Third quarter

- BOIS - Ben Ford 6-yard pass from Maddux Madsen (Canaan Moore kick), 7:22. Boise State Broncos 22-0. Drive: 7 plays, 73 yards, 3:25.
- BOIS - Canaan Moore 25-yard field goal, 0:10. Boise State Broncos 25-0. Drive: 9 plays, 52 yards, 4:41.

Fourth quarter

- BOIS - Matt Wagner 2-yard pass from Maddux Madsen (Canaan Moore kick), 7:40. Boise State Broncos 32-0. Drive: 8 plays, 38 yards, 5:00.
- WMU - Cole Cabana 2-yard run (Dieter Kelly kick), 1:03. Boise State Broncos 32-8. Drive: 5 plays, 46 yards, 1:55.

Statistics	BOIS	WMU
First downs	21	12
Plays–yards	65-377	51-223
Rushes–yards	42-173	22-113
Passing yards	204	110
Passing: comp–att–int	16-23-0	15-29-1
Time of possession	36:46	23:14

Team	Category	Player	Statistics
Boise State	Passing	Maddux Madsen	16/23, 204 yards, 3 TD
Boise State	Rushing	Dylan Riley	28 carries, 138 yards, TD
Boise State	Receiving	Matt Wagner	7 receptions, 94 yards, 2 TD
Western Michigan	Passing	Broc Lowry	15/28, 110 yards, INT
Western Michigan	Rushing	Trey Petty	2 carries, 41 yards
Western Michigan	Receiving	Jalen Buckley	4 receptions, 29 yards

=== Utah State ===
Utah State Aggies (1–3) at No. 22 Boise State Broncos (3–1) – Game summary

Quarter	1	2	3	4	Total
Aggies	0	10	0	8	18
No. 22 Broncos	14	14	3	6	37

at Albertsons Stadium • Boise, Idaho

- Date: October 3
- Game time: 5:30 PM MDT
- Game weather: Sunny • Temperature: 86 °F (30 °C) • Wind: SW at 3 miles per hour (4.8 km/h)
- Game attendance: 34,616
- Referee: Preston Clipper
- TV announcers (CBSSN): Jordan Kent, Doug Pederson, and Brandon Baylor

Game information

First quarter

- (8:17) BOIS – Dylan Riley 5-yard run, Canaan Moore kick (Drive: 6 plays, 89 yards, 2:51; Boise State 7–0)
- (0:19) BOIS – Matt Wagner 11-yard pass from Maddux Madsen, Canaan Moore kick (Drive: 12 plays, 70 yards, 6:09; Boise State 14–0)

Second quarter

- (8:45) BOIS – Dylan Riley 33-yard run, Canaan Moore kick (Drive: 9 plays, 78 yards, 5:11; Boise State 21–0)
- (5:52) USU – Javen Jacobs 1-yard pass from Grady Brosterhous, Kian Afrookhteh kick (Drive: 6 plays, 75 yards, 2:53; Boise State 21–7)
- (1:53) BOIS – Jake Ripp 21-yard interception, Canaan Moore kick (Boise State 28–7)
- (0:00) USU – Kian Afrookhteh 28-yard field goal (Drive: 7 plays, 65 yards, 1:53; Boise State 28–10)

Third quarter

- (8:22) BOIS – Canaan Moore 43-yard field goal (Drive: 12 plays, 49 yards, 6:38; Boise State 31–10)

Fourth quarter

- (9:32) USU – Eli Wood 31-yard pass from Grady Brosterhous, Kian Afrookhteh kick (Drive: 2 plays, 30 yards, 0:41; Boise State 31–18)
- (8:27) BOIS – Ben Ford 11-yard pass from Maddux Madsen (Drive: 3 plays, 75 yards, 1:05; Boise State 37–18)

Statistics	USU	BOIS
First downs	15	20
Plays–yards	58–345	62–429
Rushes–yards	33–169	41–185
Passing yards	175	244
Passing: comp–att–int	14–25–1	17–21–0
Time of possession	27:46	32:14

Team	Category	Player	Statistics
Utah State	Passing	Grady Brosterhous	12/18, 129 yards, 2 TD
Utah State	Rushing	Javen Jacobs	10 carries, 139 yards
Utah State	Receiving	Eli Wood	7 receptions, 102 yards, TD
Boise State	Passing	Maddux Madsen	17/21, 244 yards, 2 TD
Boise State	Rushing	Dylan Riley	18 carries, 93 yards, 2 TD
Boise State	Receiving	Rasean Jones	5 receptions, 88 yards

=== at Fresno State (rivalry) ===
No. 23 Boise State Broncos (4–1) at Fresno State Bulldogs (4–1) – Game summary

Quarter	1	2	3	4	Total
No. 23 Broncos	15	10	3	10	38
Bulldogs	13	7	0	11	31

at Valley Children's Stadium • Fresno, California

- Date: October 10
- Game time: 8:30 PM MDT
- Game weather: Clear • Temperature: 77 °F (25 °C) • Wind: NW at 5 miles per hour (8.0 km/h)
- Game attendance: 43,086
- Referee: John Love
- TV announcers (The CW): Rick Allen, Will Blackmon and Michael Bumpus

Game information

First quarter

- (10:58) FRES - Jayden Mandal 8-yard run (Manaki Watanabe kick), (Drive: 10 plays, 75 yards, 4:02; Fresno State 7-0)
- (10:10) BOIS - Dylan Riley 72-yard run (Zeke Martinez run), (Drive: 2 plays, 75 yards, 0:48; Boise State 8-7)
- (1:12) BOIS - Terrious Favors 72-yard pass from Maddux Madsen (Cannon Moore kick), (Drive: 13 plays, 90 yards, 7:19; Boise State 15-7)
- (0:45) FRES - Ezekiel Avit 59-yard pass from Khristian Martin (pass failed), (Drive: 2 plays, 74 yards, 0:21; Boise State 15-13)

Second quarter

- (7:42) BOIS - Sire Gaines 2-yard run (Cannon Moore kick), (Drive: 18 plays, 75 yards, 8:03; Boise State 22-13)
- (0:56) FRES - Ezekiel Avit 10-yard pass from Jayden Mandal (Manaki Watanabe kick), (Drive: 9 plays, 59 yards, 2:36; Boise State 22-20)
- (0:02) BOIS - Cannon Moore 49-yard field goal, (Drive: 7 plays, 32 yards, 0:48; Boise State 25-20)

Third quarter

- (7:08) BOIS - Cannon Moore 38-yard field goal, (Drive: 14 plays, 66 yards, 7:52; Boise State 28-20)

Fourth quarter

- (14:52) BOIS - Dylan Riley 44-yard pass from Maddux Madsen (Cannon Moore kick), (Drive: 8 plays, 88 yards, 4:10; Boise State 35-20)
- (10:41) FRES - Gavin Correia 15-yard pass from Jayden Mandal (Jahlil McClain-Jayden Mandal pass), (Drive: 11 plays, 73 yards, 5:29; Boise State 35-28)
- (1:34) BOIS - Cannon Moore 39-yard field goal, (Drive: 14 plays, 61 yards, 7:40; Boise State 38-28)
- (0:36) FRES - Manaki Watanabe 47-yard field goal, (Drive: 6 plays, 46 yards, 0:58; Boise State 38-31)

Statistics	BOIS	FRES
First downs	29	21
Plays–yards	79–512	52–346
Rushes–yards	45–274	16–69
Passing yards	238	277
Passing: comp–att–int	23–34–0	20–35–0
Time of possession	38:56	21:04

Team	Category	Player	Statistics
Boise State	Passing	Maddux Madsen	23/34, 238 yards, 2 TD
Boise State	Rushing	Dylan Riley	19 carries, 150 yards, TD
Boise State	Receiving	Dylan Riley	4 receptions, 64 yards, TD
Fresno State	Passing	Jayden Mandal	20/35, 218 yards, 2 TD
Fresno State	Rushing	Bryson Donelson	4 carries, 31 yards
Fresno State	Receiving	Ezekiel Avit	6 receptions, 96 yards, 2 TD

=== at Washington State ===
No. 21 Boise State Broncos (5–1) at Washington State Cougars (1–6) – Game summary

Quarter	1	2	3	4	Total
No. 21 Broncos	7	3	0	21	31
Cougars	0	7	3	0	10

at Martin Stadium • Pullman, Washington

- Date: October 24
- Game time: 4:00 PM MDT
- Game weather: Sunny • Temperature: 53 °F (12 °C) • Wind: W 5 mph
- Game attendance: 2,730
- Referee: Gary Reed
- TV announcers (USA): Nate Gatter, Ryan Leaf, and Lauren Green

Game information

First quarter

- BOIS - Sire Gaines 9-yard run (Canaan Moore kick), 4:24. Broncos 7-0. Drive: 7 plays, 74 yards, 4:35.

Second quarter

- WSU - Kirby Vorhees 1-yard run (Jack Stevens kick), 0:31. Tied 7-7. Drive: 16 plays, 73 yards, 6:44.
- BOIS - Canaan Moore 28-yard field goal, 0:00. Broncos 10-7. Drive: 8 plays, 54 yards, 0:46.

Third quarter

- WSU - Jack Stevens 47-yard field goal, 5:53. Tied 10-10. Drive: 8 plays, 31 yards, 3:48.

Fourth quarter

- BOIS - Cam Bates 6-yard pass from Maddux Madsen (Canaan Moore kick), 13:33. Broncos 17-10. Drive: 15 plays, 70 yards, 7:14.
- BOIS - Dylan Riley 33-yard run (Canaan Moore kick), 11:40. Broncos 24-10. Drive: 2 plays, 33 yards, 0:43.
- BOIS - Dylan Riley 72-yard run (Canaan Moore kick), 6:26. Broncos 31-10. Drive: 3 plays, 90 yards, 1:48.

Statistics	BOIS	WSU
First downs	21	19
Plays–yards	61–407	73–244
Rushes–yards	37–258	33–53
Passing yards	149	191
Passing: comp–att–int	14–24–0	21–40–1
Time of possession	29:12	30:48

Team	Category	Player	Statistics
Boise State	Passing	Maddux Madsen	14/23, 149 yards, TD
Boise State	Rushing	Dylan Riley	13 carries, 128 yards, 2 TD
Boise State	Receiving	Rasean Jones	5 receptions, 69 yards
Washington State	Passing	Owen Eshelman	21/40, 191 yards, INT
Washington State	Rushing	Owen Eshelman	23 carries, 33 yards
Washington State	Receiving	Branden Ganashamoorthy	4 receptions, 58 yards

=== Texas State ===
Texas State Bobcats (4–3) at No. 20т Boise State Broncos (6–1) – Game summary

Quarter	1	2	3	4	Total
Bobcats	0	3	22	20	45
No. 20т Broncos	7	21	0	18	46

at Albertsons Stadium • Boise, Idaho

- Date: October 31
- Game time: 8:00 PM MDT
- Referee: Chris Wiggins
- TV announcers (The CW): Rick Allen, Will Blackmon, and Michael Bumpus

Statistics	TXST	BOIS
First downs		
Plays–yards		
Rushes–yards		
Passing yards		
Passing: comp–att–int		
Time of possession		

Team	Category	Player	Statistics
Texas State	Passing		
Texas State	Rushing		
Texas State	Receiving		
Boise State	Passing		
Boise State	Rushing		
Boise State	Receiving		

=== at Colorado State ===
No. 25 Boise State Broncos (7–1) at Colorado State Rams (3–5) – Game summary

Quarter	1	2	3	4	Total
No. 25 Broncos	22	7	14	21	64
Rams	7	3	14	14	38

at Canvas Stadium • Fort Collins, Colorado

- Date: November 7
- Game time: 4:00 PM MST
- Referee: Chris Snead
- TV announcers (USA): Nate Gatter, Ryan Leaf, and Lauren Green

Statistics	BOIS	CSU
First downs		
Plays–yards		
Rushes–yards		
Passing yards		
Passing: comp–att–int		
Time of possession		

Team	Category	Player	Statistics
Boise State	Passing		
Boise State	Rushing		
Boise State	Receiving		
Colorado State	Passing		
Colorado State	Rushing		
Colorado State	Receiving		

=== Oregon State ===
Oregon State Beavers (5–4) at No. 24 Boise State Broncos (8–1) – Game summary

Quarter	1	2	3	4	Total
Beavers	7	13	7	14	41
No. 24 Broncos	15	17	0	14	46

at Albertsons Stadium • Boise, Idaho

- Date: November 14
- Game time: 4:00 PM MST
- Referee: Chris Wiggins
- TV announcers (USA): Nate Gatter, Ryan Leaf, and Lauren Green

Statistics	ORST	BOIS
First downs		
Plays–yards		
Rushes–yards		
Passing yards		
Passing: comp–att–int		
Time of possession		

Team	Category	Player	Statistics
Oregon State	Passing		
Oregon State	Rushing		
Oregon State	Receiving		
Boise State	Passing		
Boise State	Rushing		
Boise State	Receiving		

=== San Diego State ===
San Diego State Aztecs (5–5) at No. 17 Boise State Broncos (9–1) – Game summary

Quarter	1	2	3	4	Total
Aztecs	0	0	0	0	0
No. 17 Broncos	0	0	0	0	0

at Albertsons Stadium • Boise, Idaho

- Date: November 21
- Game time: 7:30 PM MST
- TV announcers (USA): Ted Robinson, Darius Walker, and Dalen Cuff

Statistics	SDSU	BOIS
First downs		
Plays–yards		
Rushes–yards		
Passing yards		
Passing: comp–att–int		
Time of possession		

Team	Category	Player	Statistics
San Diego State	Passing		
San Diego State	Rushing		
San Diego State	Receiving		
Boise State	Passing		
Boise State	Rushing		
Boise State	Receiving		

=== at Colorado State ===
Boise State Broncos (0–0) at Pac-12 opponent TBA (0–0) – Game summary

Quarter	1	2	3	4	Total
Broncos	0	0	0	0	0
TBD	0	0	0	0	0

- Date: November 28
- Game time: TBD

Statistics	BOIS	TBA
First downs		
Plays–yards		
Rushes–yards		
Passing yards		
Passing: comp–att–int		
Time of possession		

Team	Category	Player	Statistics
Boise State	Passing		
Boise State	Rushing		
Boise State	Receiving		
Pac-12 opponent TBA	Passing		
Pac-12 opponent TBA	Rushing		
Pac-12 opponent TBA	Receiving		

=== San Diego State (Pac-12 Championship Game) ===
2026 Pac-12 Championship Game
San Diego State Aztecs at Boise State Broncos – Game summary

Quarter	1	2	3	4	Total
Aztecs	0	0	0	0	0
Broncos	0	0	0	0	0

at Albertsons Stadium • Boise, Idaho

- Date: December 4
- Game time: 6:00 p.m. MST
- TV: CBS

Statistics	SDSU	BOIS
First downs		
Plays–yards		
Rushes–yards		
Passing yards		
Passing: comp–att–int		
Time of possession		

Team	Category	Player	Statistics
San Diego State	Passing		
San Diego State	Rushing		
San Diego State	Receiving		
Boise State	Passing		
Boise State	Rushing		
Boise State	Receiving		

== Roster ==
2026 Boise State Broncos football team roster
Players
Coaches
Offense

Pos.	#	Name	Class
QB	4	Maddux Madsen	Sr
QB	10	Cash Herrera	Fr
WR	13	Darren Morris	Sr
QB	14	Max Cutforth	Jr
QB	15	Zeke Martinez	Fr
QB	16	Jackson Taylor	Fr
WR	19	Rasean Jones	Fr
WR	21	Akeem Wright	Sr
RB	22	Juelz Goff	So
RB	23	Keilan Chavies	Fr
RB	0	Dylan Riley	Jr
WR	25	Quinton Brown	So
RB	26	Sire Gaines	So
RB	27	Harry Stewart III	So
WR	29	AJ Jones	Fr
TE	45	Troy Grizzle	So
TE	46	Carter Kuchenbuch	Fr
TE	47	Kaden Anderson	So
TE	48	Ryan Brekke	Fr
WR	49	A. J. Maes	Jr
OL	52	Stewart Taufa	Fr
OL	59	Jameson Perry	Fr
OL	62	Roger Carreon	Sr
OL	64	Carson Rasmussen	Jr
OL	66	Jacob Tracy	Fr
OL	67	Jason Steele	Jr
OL	68	Jake Steele	Sr
OL	69	Zander Esty	Jr
OT	70	Kyle Cox	Jr
OL	72	Daniil Starykh	Fr
OL	73	Parker Perkins	So
OL	74	Alma Taleni	So
OL	75	Daylon Metoyer	Sr
OL	76	Greg Bienvenue	So
OL	77	Kole Cronin	Fr
OL	78	Tyler Ethridge	Sr
OL	79	Connor Warkentin	So
WR	80	Cameron Bates	Jr
WR	81	Kamryn Jones	Fr
WR	82	Ben Ford	Sr
WR	83	Qumonte Williams Jr.	So
WR	84	Gavin Packer	Fr
WR	85	Terrious Favors	Fr
TE	86	Austin Terry	Sr
TE	87	Keawe Browne	Fr
TE	88	Matt Wagner	Jr
WR	89	AJ Logan	Fr

Defense

Pos.	#	Name	Class
LB	1	Boen Phelps	Jr
EDGE	5	Jayden Virgin-Morgan	Sr
DB	7	Jaden Mickey	Sr
DB	8	Sherrod Smith	Jr
DB	10	Derek Ganter Jr.	Jr
EDGE	13	Sterling Lane II	Sr
DB	14	Demetrius Freeney	Sr
DB	15	JeRico Washington Jr.	Jr
DB	16	Franklyn Johnson Jr.	Jr
LB	17	Logan Brantley	Jr
LB	18	Samuel Brooks	Sr
DB	19	Madden Soliai	Fr
DB	20	Kyle Hall	Jr
DB	22	Roman Tillmon	Jr
DB	23	Davin Hill	Fr
DB	28	Cam Jamerson	Fr
DB	29	Arthur de Boachie	So
LB	30	Adam Auston	Fr
DB	31	Cole Miller	Jr
DB	32	Taebron Bennie-Powell	So
DB	33	Josiah Alanis	Fr
DB	34	Dominik Calhoun	Fr
DB	35	Treyvon Tolmaire	So
DB	36	Tahj Crutchfield	Fr
DB	38	Travis Anderson	So
DB	39	Timothy Mitchell	So
EDGE	40	De'Shawn Toilolo	Fr
LB	41	Rocky Dunn	Fr
LB	42	Zyhaire Lewis	Jr
LB	43	Jake Ripp	Sr
LB	44	Syncere Brackett	So
EDGE	45	Markell Bowens	Fr
EDGE	50	Jaden Williams	Fr
EDGE	51	Roman Caywood	So
LB	53	Ty Tanner	So
LB	55	Mana Tuioti	So
DL	56	Rowan Rupp	Fr
EDGE	57	Gustaf Henriks Ras	Fr
DL	90	Andrew Rheubottom	Sr
EDGE	91	Bol Bol	So
DL	92	David Latu	Sr
DL	93	Ryder Swanson	Fr
DL	94	Paz St. John	Fr
EDGE	95	Max Stege	Sr
DL	96	Lopez Sanusi	So
DL	97	Mikaio Edward	Jr
DL	98	Bethel Imasuen	Fr
DT	99	Michael Madrie	Jr

Special teams

Pos.	#	Name	Class
K	35	Colton Boomer	Sr
P	37	Oscar Doyle	Sr
K	48	Canaan Moore	Fr
LS	61	Caden Kellow	Sr

Head coach

- Spencer Danielson

Coordinators/assistant coaches

- Stacy Collins – Assistant head coach/special teams coordinator/linebackers
- Erik Chinander – Defensive coordinator
- Nate Potter – Offensive coordinator
- Terrence Brown – Co-defensive coordinator/defensive backs
- Zak Hill – Co-offensive coordinator/quarterbacks
- Jabril Frazier – Run game coordinator/edge rushers
- Tim Keane – Run game coordinator/offensive linemen
- Alvis Whitted – Passing game coordinator/wide receivers
- D. J. Killings – Cornerbacks
- Frank Maile – Defensive linemen
- James Montgomery – Running backs
- Justin Udy – Tight ends
- Derrick McMahen - Assistant defensive backs
- Stiles Satterlee – Assistant linebackers
- Demitri Washington – Assistant defensive linemen
- Dirk Koetter – Senior analyst
- Chris Strausser – Senior offensive analyst
- Devon McPeek – Special teams analyst
- Kenny Zamberlin – Offensive quality control
- Benjamin Hilgart – Director, strength and conditioning
- Marques White – Associate director, strength and conditioning
- Collin McKelvey – Assistant director, strength and conditioning
- Josh Price – Senior assistant director, strength and conditioning
- Tom Keay – Assistant director, strength and conditioning

Legend

- (C) Team captain
- (S) Suspended
- (I) Ineligible
- Injured
- Redshirt

Roster
Last update: 06/03/26
