= 2026 San Diego State Aztecs football team =

American college football season

2026 San Diego State Aztecs football

Pac-12 Championship Game, at Boise State
- Conference: Pac-12 Conference
- Record: 6–5 (5–2 Pac-12)
- Head coach: Sean Lewis (3rd season)
- Associate head coach: Zac Barton (3rd season)
- Offensive coordinator: Matt Johnson (2nd season)
- Offensive scheme: Veer and shoot
- Defensive coordinator: Demetrius Sumler (1st season)
- Base defense: 4–2–5
- Home stadium: Snapdragon Stadium

2026 Pac-12 Conference football standings
	Conf.			Overall
Team	W		L	W		L
No. 17 Boise State y	6	–	1	9	–	2
San Diego State y	5	–	2	6	–	5
Texas State	5	–	2	7	–	4
Oregon State	4	–	3	6	–	5
Utah State	3	–	4	4	–	7
Fresno State	3	–	4	6	–	5
Washington State	1	–	6	2	–	9
Colorado State	1	–	6	3	–	8
Championship: San Diego State at Boise State
y – Championship game participant; As of November 22, 2026; Rankings from CFP rankings

The 2026 San Diego State Aztecs football team represents San Diego State University as a member of the Pac-12 Conference during the 2026 NCAA Division I FBS football season. The team is led by third-year head coach Sean Lewis, and play their home games at Snapdragon Stadium in San Diego.

This is the Aztecs' first season in the Pac-12, after they were a member of the Mountain West for most sports since 1999.

== Offseason ==
On December 7, 2025, defensive coordinator Rob Aurich was hired to the same position at Nebraska. The next day, cornerbacks coach Demetrius Sumler was named the interim defensive coordinator for the New Mexico Bowl. On December 20, a week ahead of the bowl game, Sumler was announced as the team's permanent defensive coordinator.

== Preseason ==
The Aztecs started their offseason with nine weeks of winter workouts, starting on January 23. Spring practice began on March 23, which is scheduled to culminate with the spring game on May 2 at the SDSU practice fields.

== Schedule ==
Date	Time	Opponent	Site	TV	Result	Attendance
September 5	6:30 p.m.	Portland State*	Snapdragon Stadium; San Diego, CA	USA	W 53–20	26,913
September 12	8:00 p.m.	at UCLA*	Rose Bowl; Pasadena, CA	BTN	L 10–28	31,973
September 19	7:00 p.m.	James Madison*	Snapdragon Stadium; San Diego, CA	The CW	L 13–26	26,487
September 26	9:00 a.m.	at Toledo*	Glass Bowl; Toledo, OH	BSSN	L 16–41	22,126
October 3	7:30 p.m.	Texas State	Snapdragon Stadium; San Diego, CA	The CW	W 31–29	28,474
October 10	3:00 p.m.	at Oregon State	Reser Stadium; Corvallis, OR	USA	L 14–66	37,361
October 17	7:30 p.m.	Fresno State	Snapdragon Stadium; San Diego, CA (rivalry)	CBSSN	W 26–23	21,847
October 24	3:30 p.m.	at Colorado State	Canvas Stadium; Fort Collins, CO	The CW	L 49–56	33,720
October 31	4:00 p.m.	Washington State	Snapdragon Stadium; San Diego, CA	CBSSN	W 26–20	19,184
November 14	6:30 p.m.	Utah State	Snapdragon Stadium; San Diego, CA	USA	W 30–13	21,231
November 21	6:30 p.m.	at No. 17 Boise State	Albertsons Stadium; Boise, ID	USA	W 22–20	34,430
November 28	TBD	at Washington State (Note: In the 2026 season, the Pac-12 will use a "flex" scheduling model for Week 13. After the round-robin conference schedule, the conference will determine the pairings for Week 13. "Flex" games will not count in the conference standings.)*	Martin Stadium; Pullman, WA	TBD		
December 4	5:00 p.m.	at Boise State	Albertsons Stadium; Boise, ID (Pac-12 Championship Game)	CBS		
*Non-conference game; Rankings from AP Poll (and CFP Rankings, after November 3) – Released prior to game; All times are in Pacific time; Source:

== Game summaries ==
=== Portland State (FCS) ===
Portland State Vikings (FCS) (0–1) at San Diego State Aztecs (0–0) – Game summary

Quarter	1	2	3	4	Total
Vikings (FCS)	6	0	7	7	20
Aztecs	7	22	14	10	53

at Snapdragon Stadium • San Diego, California

- Date: September 5
- Game time: 6:30 p.m.
- Game weather: Sunny • Temperature: 86 °F (30 °C) • Wind: N at 6 miles per hour (9.7 km/h)
- Game attendance: 26,913
- Referee: Chris Snead
- TV announcers (USA): Ted Robinson, Darius Walker and Dalen Cuff

Game information

First quarter

- PRST – Joshua Hossmann Lees 22-yard field goal, 6:46. Vikings 3–0. Drive: 14 plays, 60 yards, 5:34.
- PRST – Joshua Hossmann Lees 35-yard field goal, 2:14. Vikings 6–0. Drive: 8 plays, 44 yards, 2:52.
- SDSU – Nathan Acevedo 9-yard pass from Jayden Denegal (Cooper DiLeva kick), 0:33. Aztecs 7–6. Drive: 4 plays, 65 yards, 1:34.

Second quarter

- SDSU – Lucky Sutton 1-yard run (Cooper DiLeva kick), 14:04. Aztecs 14–6. Drive: 1 play, 1 yard, 0:03.
- SDSU – Justius Lowe 40-yard pass from Jayden Denegal (Bert Emanuel Jr. run), 8:40. Aztecs 22–6. Drive: 6 plays, 83 yards, 1:42.
- SDSU – Lucky Sutton 13-yard run (Cooper DiLeva kick), 2:37. Aztecs 29–6. Drive: 9 plays, 54 yards, 4:00.

Third quarter

- PRST – Terence Loville 10-yard pass from Gabe Downing (Joshua Hossmann Lees kick), 11:48. Aztecs 29–13. Drive: 2 plays, 10 yards, 0:48.
- SDSU – Jaylon Hawkins 100-yard kickoff return (Cooper DiLeva kick), 11:31. Aztecs 36–13.
- SDSU – Lucky Sutton 5-yard run (Cooper DiLeva kick), 6:16. Aztecs 43–13. Drive: 7 plays, 30 yards, 3:43.

Fourth quarter

- SDSU – Cooper DiLeva 31-yard field goal, 14:18. Aztecs 46–13. Drive: 8 plays, 61 yards, 3:45.
- PRST – Gabe Downing 1-yard run (Joshua Hossmann Lees kick), 5:16. Aztecs 46–20. Drive: 11 plays, 42 yards, 5:17.
- SDSU – Jordin Thomas 2-yard run (Cooper DiLeva kick), 3:03. Aztecs 53–20. Drive: 7 plays, 65 yards, 2:13.

Statistics	PRST	SDSU
First downs	21	22
Plays–yards	82–375	63–394
Rushes–yards	30–95	42–237
Passing yards	280	157
Passing: Comp–Att–Int	31–52–2	14–21–1
Turnovers	3	3
Time of possession	33:25	26:35

Team	Category	Player	Statistics
Portland State	Passing	Gabe Downing	31/52, 280 yards, TD, 2 INT
Portland State	Rushing	Delon Thompson	20 carries, 80 yards
Portland State	Receiving	Terence Loville	10 receptions, 119 yards, TD
San Diego State	Passing	Jayden Denegal	12/17, 137 yards, 2 TD, INT
San Diego State	Rushing	Javion Kinnard	8 carries, 79 yards
San Diego State	Receiving	Justius Lowe	2 receptions, 56 yards, TD

=== at UCLA ===
San Diego State Aztecs (1–0) at UCLA Bruins (1–0) – Game summary

Quarter	1	2	3	4	Total
Aztecs	0	0	0	10	10
Bruins	0	0	7	21	28

at Rose Bowl • Pasadena, California

- Date: September 12
- Game time: 4:15 p.m.
- Game weather: Sunny • Temperature: 87 °F (31 °C) • Wind: SW at 6 miles per hour (9.7 km/h)
- Game attendance: 31,973
- Referee: Gary Reed
- TV announcers (BTN): Wayne Randazzo, Brett Hundley and Emma Carpenter

Game information

First quarter

- No scoring plays.

Second quarter

- No scoring plays.

Third quarter

- UCLA – Wayne Knight 8-yard run (Mateen Bhaghani kick), 11:17. Bruins 7–0. Drive: 4 plays, 43 yards, 2:05.

Fourth quarter

- SDSU – Cooper DiLeva 46-yard field goal, 13:11. Bruins 7–3. Drive: 9 plays, 48 yards, 2:28.
- UCLA – Wayne Knight 7-yard run (Mateen Bhaghani kick), 7:17. Bruins 14–3. Drive: 9 plays, 75 yards, 5:54.
- UCLA – Jaivian Thomas 1-yard run (Mateen Bhaghani kick), 4:31. Bruins 21–3. Drive: 4 plays, 19 yards, 1:59.
- SDSU – Jackson Ford 19-yard pass from Jayden Denegal (Cooper DiLeva kick), 2:28. Bruins 21–10. Drive: 5 plays, 65 yards, 2:03.
- UCLA – Wayne Knight 36-yard run (Mateen Bhaghani kick), 2:16. Bruins 28–10. Drive: 2 plays, 42 yards, 2:16.

Statistics	SDSU	UCLA
First downs	14	19
Plays–yards	56–189	66–365
Rushes–yards	38–144	43–214
Passing yards	45	151
Passing: comp–att–int	6–18–1	14–23–1
Turnovers	1	1
Time of possession	25:05	34:55

Team	Category	Player	Statistics
San Diego State	Passing	Jayden Denegal	6/17, 45 yards, TD, INT
San Diego State	Rushing	Lucky Sutton	19 carries, 81 yards
San Diego State	Receiving	Jackson Ford	1 reception, 19 yards, TD
UCLA	Passing	Nico Iamaleava	14/22, 151 yards, INT
UCLA	Rushing	Wayne Knight	13 carries, 97 yards, 3 TD
UCLA	Receiving	Semaj Morgan	6 receptions, 73 yards

=== James Madison ===
James Madison Dukes (2–0) at San Diego State Aztecs (1–1) – Game summary

Quarter	1	2	3	4	Total
Dukes	10	9	0	7	26
Aztecs	0	0	7	6	13

at Snapdragon Stadium • San Diego, California

- Date: September 19
- Game time: 7:00 p.m.
- Game weather: Clear • Temperature: 71 °F (22 °C) • Wind: N at 4 miles per hour (6.4 km/h)
- Game attendance: 26,487
- Referee: John Love
- TV announcers (CW): Chris Fisher (play-by-play), Will Blackmon (analyst) and Michael Bumpus (sideline reporter)

Game information

First quarter

- JMU – Camden Coleman 4-yard run (Morgan Suarez kick), 12:14. Dukes 7–0. Drive: 6 plays, 75 yards, 2:46.
- JMU – Morgan Suarez 46-yard field goal, 4:03. Dukes 10–0. Drive: 14 plays, 55 yards, 4:38.

Second quarter

- JMU – Morgan Suarez 32-yard field goal, 14:13. Dukes 13–0. Drive: 10 plays, 60 yards, 3:31.
- JMU – Cole Keller 7-yard pass from Camden Coleman (two-point pass conversion failed), 0:30. Dukes 19–0. Drive: 2 plays, 9 yards, 0:26.

Third quarter

- SDSU – Javion Kinnard 3-yard run (Cooper DiLeva kick), 6:47. Dukes 19–7. Drive: 11 plays, 82 yards, 4:19.

Fourth quarter

- JMU – Cole Keller 20-yard pass from Camden Coleman (Morgan Suarez kick), 12:54. Dukes 26–7. Drive: 8 plays, 74 yards, 3:11.
- SDSU – Nathan Acevedo 14-yard pass from Jayden Denegal (two-point conversion run failed), 8:52. Dukes 26–13. Drive: 10 plays, 75 yards, 4:02.

Statistics	JMU	SDSU
First downs	20	21
Plays–yards	74-417	77-401
Rushes–yards	47-171	44-192
Passing yards	246	209
Passing: comp–att–int	19-27-0	18-33-2
Time of possession	30:19	29:41

Team	Category	Player	Statistics
James Madison	Passing	Camden Coleman	19/27, 246 yards, 2 TDs
James Madison	Rushing	George Pettaway	20 carries, 82 yards
James Madison	Receiving	Braeden Wisloski	5 receptions, 90 yards
San Diego State	Passing	Jayden Denegal	18/33, 209 yards, TD, 2 INTs
San Diego State	Rushing	Javion Kinnard	33 carries, 181 yards, TD
San Diego State	Receiving	Javion Kinnard	4 receptions, 70 yards

=== at Toledo ===
San Diego State Aztecs (1–2) at Toledo Rockets (2–1) – Game summary

Quarter	1	2	3	4	Total
Aztecs	3	0	6	7	16
Rockets	7	10	17	7	41

at Glass Bowl • Toledo, Ohio

- Date: September 26
- Game time: 9:00 a.m.
- Game weather: Sunny • Temperature: 68 °F (20 °C) • Wind: NE at 6 miles per hour (9.7 km/h)
- Game attendance: 22,126
- Referee: Preston Clipper
- TV announcers (CBSSN): Jack Gordon and Taylor McHargue

Game information

First quarter

- SDSU - Cooper DiLeva 25-yard field goal, 11:59. Aztecs 3-0. Drive: 10 plays, 68 yards, 3:01.
- TOL - Adjatay Dabbs 19-yard pass from John Alan Richter (Reice Griffith kick), 7:09. Rockets 7-3. Drive: 3 plays, 45 yards, 1:01.

Second quarter

- TOL - Reice Griffith 38-yard field goal, 4:43. Rockets 10-3. Drive: 11 plays, 40 yards, 4:59.
- TOL - Bryson Hammer 78-yard pass from John Alan Richter (Reice Griffin kick), 1:44. Rockets 17-3. Drive: 3 plays, 88 yards, 0:54.

Third quarter

- TOL - Bryson Hammer 38-yard pass from John Alan Richter (Reice Griffin kick), 14:53. Rockets 24-3. Drive: 1 play, 38 yards, 0:06.
- TOL - Reice Griffith 49-yard field goal, 9:55. Rockets 27-3. Drive: 8 plays, 54 yards, 3:33.
- TOL - Isaac Zay 67-yard interception return (Reice Griffith kick), 6:34. Rockets 34-3. Drive: 5 plays, 39 yards, 1:39.
- SDSU - Ryan Wolfer 11-yard pass from Jayden Denegal (two-point run conversion failed), 0:20. Rockets 34-9. Drive: 15 plays, 78 yards, 6:08.

Fourth quarter

- TOL - Connor Walendzak 1-yard run (Reice Griffith kick), 12:11. Rockets 41-9. Drive: 7 plays, 73 yards, 3:04.
- SDSU - Jaylon Hawkins 14-yard pass from Draiden Trudeau (Cooper DiLeva kick), 2:38. Rockets 41-16. Drive: 9 plays, 65 yards, 3:18.

Statistics	SDSU	TOL
First downs	16	19
Plays–yards	68-296	70-494
Rushes–yards	31-48	48-210
Passing yards	248	284
Passing: comp–att–int	24-37-1	16-22-0
Turnovers	2	0
Time of possession	26:35	33:25

Team	Category	Player	Statistics
San Diego State	Passing	Jayden Denegal	19/31, 206 yards, TD, INT
San Diego State	Rushing	Josiah Lucas	9 carries, 18 yards
San Diego State	Receiving	Jacob Bostick	3 receptions, 69 yards
Toledo	Passing	John Alan Richter	16/22, 284 yards, 3 TD
Toledo	Rushing	Autavius Ison	15 carries, 89 yards
Toledo	Receiving	Bryson Hammer	6 receptions, 133 yards, 2 TD

=== Texas State ===
Texas State Bobcats (2–2) at San Diego State Aztecs (1–3) – Game summary

Quarter	1	2	3	4	Total
Bobcats	10	7	0	12	29
Aztecs	3	0	21	7	31

at Snapdragon Stadium • San Diego, California

- Date: October 3
- Game time: 7:30 p.m.
- Game weather: -
- Game attendance: -
- Referee: -
- TV: The CW

Game information

First quarter
Second quarter
Third quarter
Fourth quarter

Statistics	TXST	SDSU
First downs		
Plays–yards		
Rushes–yards		
Passing yards		
Passing: Comp–Att–Int		
Turnovers		
Time of possession		

Team	Category	Player	Statistics
Texas State	Passing		
Texas State	Rushing		
Texas State	Receiving		
San Diego State	Passing		
San Diego State	Rushing		
San Diego State	Receiving		

=== at Oregon State ===
San Diego State Aztecs (2–3) at Oregon State Beavers (3–2) – Game summary

Quarter	1	2	3	4	Total
Aztecs	0	7	7	0	14
Beavers	14	24	21	7	66

at Reser Stadium • Corvallis, Oregon

- Date: October 10
- Game time: 3:00 p.m.
- Game weather: -
- Game attendance: -
- Referee: -
- TV announcers (USA): Nate Gatter, Ryan Leaf, and Lauren Green

Game information

First quarter
Second quarter
Third quarter
Fourth quarter

Statistics	SDSU	ORST
First downs		
Plays–yards		
Rushes–yards		
Passing yards		
Passing: comp–att–int		
Turnovers		
Time of possession		

Team	Category	Player	Statistics
San Diego State	Passing		
San Diego State	Rushing		
San Diego State	Receiving		
Oregon State	Passing		
Oregon State	Rushing		
Oregon State	Receiving		

=== Fresno State (rivalry) ===
Fresno State Bulldogs (4–2) at San Diego State Aztecs (2–4) – Game summary

Quarter	1	2	3	4	Total
Bulldogs	0	10	7	6	23
Aztecs	10	6	0	10	26

at Snapdragon Stadium • San Diego, California

- Date: October 17
- Game time: 7:30 p.m.
- Game weather: Clear • Temperature: 80 °F (27 °C) • Wind: N at 2 miles per hour (3.2 km/h)
- Game attendance: 21,847
- Referee: Preston Clipper
- TV announcers (CBSSN): Rich Waltz (play-by-play), Adam Breneman (analyst) and Jordan Giorgio (sideline)

Game information

First quarter

- (6:16) SDSU - Cooper DiLeva 32-yard field goal, (Drive: 6 plays, 18 yards, 2:48; San Diego State 3-0)
- (1:58) SDSU - Jaylon Hawkins 52-yard pass from Jayden Denegal (Cooper DiLeva kick), (Drive: 6 plays, 75 yards, 2:11; San Diego State 10-0)

Second quarter

- (11:34) SDSU - Cooper DiLeva 30-yard field goal, (Drive: 9 plays, 61 yards, 3:42; San Diego State 13-0)
- (7:48) FRES - Manaki Watanabe 51-yard field goal, (Drive: 9 plays, 42 yards, 3:46; San Diego State 13-3)
- (4:02) FRES - Bryson Donelson 4-yard run (Manaki Watanabe kick), (Drive: 5 plays, 38 yards, 2:42; San Diego State 13-10)
- (0:01) SDSU - Cooper DiLeva 40-yard field goal, (Drive: 4 plays, 5 yards, 1:05; San Diego State 16-10)

Third quarter

- (5:16) FRES - Julius Gillick 7-yard run (Manaki Watanabe kick), (Drive: 10 plays, 75 yards, 4:55; Fresno State 17-16)

Fourth quarter

- (12:00) SDSU - Jordan Napier 7-yard pass from Bert Emanuel Jr. (Cooper DiLeva kick), (Drive: 6 plays, 92 yards, 3:00; San Diego State 23-17)
- (5:02) FRES - Julius Gillick 2-yard run (kick failed), (Drive: 11 plays, 75 yards, 6:58; Tied 23-23)
- (0:57) SDSU - Cooper DiLeva 53-yard field goal, (Drive: 10 plays, 41 yards, 3:48; San Diego State 26-23)

Statistics	FRES	SDSU
First downs	18	17
Plays–yards	65–276	62–384
Rushes–yards	40–135	40–204
Passing yards	141	180
Passing: Comp–Att–Int	13–25–0	14–22–0
Turnovers	1	1
Time of possession	31:34	28:26

Team	Category	Player	Statistics
Fresno State	Passing	Jayden Mandal	13/25, 141 yards
Fresno State	Rushing	Bryson Donelson	13 carries, 62 yards, TD
Fresno State	Receiving	Josiah Freeman	3 receptions, 49 yards
San Diego State	Passing	Jayden Denegal	7/10, 112 yards, TD
San Diego State	Rushing	Lucky Sutton	18 carries, 110 yards
San Diego State	Receiving	Jaylon Hawkins	6 receptions, 84 yards, TD

=== at Colorado State ===
San Diego State Aztecs (3–4) at Colorado State Rams (2–4) – Game summary

Quarter	1	2	3	4	Total
Aztecs	14	10	10	15	49
Rams	14	21	7	14	56

at Canvas Stadium • Fort Collins, Colorado

- Date: October 24
- Game time: 3:30 p.m.
- Game weather: -
- Game attendance: -
- Referee: -
- TV: The CW

Game information

First quarter
Second quarter
Third quarter
Fourth quarter

Statistics	SDSU	CSU
First downs		
Plays–yards		
Rushes–yards		
Passing yards		
Passing: comp–att–int		
Turnovers		
Time of possession		

Team	Category	Player	Statistics
San Diego State	Passing		
San Diego State	Rushing		
San Diego State	Receiving		
Colorado State	Passing		
Colorado State	Rushing		
Colorado State	Receiving		

=== Washington State ===
Washington State Cougars (1–7) at San Diego State Aztecs (3–5) – Game summary

Quarter	1	2	3	4	Total
Cougars	7	7	0	6	20
Aztecs	7	10	3	6	26

at Snapdragon Stadium • San Diego, California

- Date: October 31
- Game time: 4:00 p.m.
- Game weather: -
- Game attendance: -
- Referee: John Love
- TV: CBSSN

Game information

First quarter
Second quarter
Third quarter
Fourth quarter

Statistics	WSU	SDSU
First downs		
Plays–yards		
Rushes–yards		
Passing yards		
Passing: Comp–Att–Int		
Turnovers		
Time of possession		

Team	Category	Player	Statistics
Washington State	Passing		
Washington State	Rushing		
Washington State	Receiving		
San Diego State	Passing		
San Diego State	Rushing		
San Diego State	Receiving		

=== Utah State ===
Utah State Aggies (4–5) at San Diego State Aztecs (4–5) – Game summary

Quarter	1	2	3	4	Total
Aggies	7	0	0	6	13
Aztecs	3	7	10	10	30

at Snapdragon Stadium • San Diego, California

- Date: November 14
- Game time: 6:30 p.m.
- Game weather: -
- Game attendance: -
- Referee: -
- TV announcers (USA): Ted Robinson, Erik Coleman, and Dalen Cuff

Game information

First quarter
Second quarter
Third quarter
Fourth quarter

Statistics	USU	SDSU
First downs		
Plays–yards		
Rushes–yards		
Passing yards		
Passing: Comp–Att–Int		
Turnovers		
Time of possession		

Team	Category	Player	Statistics
Utah State	Passing		
Utah State	Rushing		
Utah State	Receiving		
San Diego State	Passing		
San Diego State	Rushing		
San Diego State	Receiving		

=== at No. 17 Boise State ===
San Diego State Aztecs (5–5) at No. 17 Boise State Broncos (9–1) – Game summary

Quarter	1	2	3	4	Total
Aztecs	0	0	0	0	0
No. 17 Broncos	0	0	0	0	0

at Albertsons Stadium • Boise, Idaho

- Date: November 21
- Game time: 6:30 p.m.
- Game weather: -
- Game attendance: -
- Referee: -
- TV announcers (USA): Ted Robinson, Darius Walker, and Dalen Cuff

Game information

First quarter
Second quarter
Third quarter
Fourth quarter

Statistics	SDSU	BOIS
First downs		
Plays–yards		
Rushes–yards		
Passing yards		
Passing: comp–att–int		
Turnovers		
Time of possession		

Team	Category	Player	Statistics
San Diego State	Passing		
San Diego State	Rushing		
San Diego State	Receiving		
Boise State	Passing		
Boise State	Rushing		
Boise State	Receiving		

=== at Pac-12 opponent TBA ===
San Diego State Aztecs (0–0) at Pac-12 opponent TBA (0–0) – Game summary

Quarter	1	2	Total
Aztecs			0
TBD			0

- Date: November 28
- Game time: TBD

Statistics	SDSU	TBA
First downs		
Plays–yards		
Rushes–yards		
Passing yards		
Passing: comp–att–int		
Time of possession		

Team	Category	Player	Statistics
San Diego State	Passing		
San Diego State	Rushing		
San Diego State	Receiving		
Pac-12 opponent TBA	Passing		
Pac-12 opponent TBA	Rushing		
Pac-12 opponent TBA	Receiving		
