= Max Cutforth =

American football player

No. 14 – Boise State Broncos
- Position: Quarterback
- Class: Redshirt Junior

Personal information
- Listed height: 6 ft 2 in (1.88 m)
- Listed weight: 215 lb (98 kg)

Career information
- High school: Skyview
- College: Boise State (2023–present)
- Stats at ESPN

Max Cutforth is an American football quarterback for the Boise State Broncos.

== Early life ==
Cutforth attended Skyview High School in Nampa, Idaho. He committed to play college football for the Boise State Broncos as a walk on.

== College career ==
During his first two seasons in 2023 and 2024, Cutforth completed two passes for 13 yards in two games. Heading into the 2025 season, he was named the team's backup quarterback behind Maddux Madsen. In week 10 of the 2025 season, Cutforth replaced an injured Madsen, completing 14 of 29 pass attempts for 106 yards and a touchdown in a loss to Fresno State. In week 13, Cutforth completed 22 for 34 passes for 239 yards in his first win as a starter over Colorado State. Cutforth appeared in 11 games with 3 starts that season, completing 95 of 167 pass attempts for 1,059 yards and four touchdowns with five interceptions. In week 9 he replaced an injured Madsen and passed for 131 yards and three touchdowns in a comeback win over Texas State. In week 10 he made his first start of the season completing 16 of 19 passes for 317 yards and four touchdowns, while adding a touchdown on the ground in a victory against Colorado State.
