= 2026 Pac-12 Conference football season =

- League: NCAA Division I Football Bowl Subdivision
- Sport: Football
- Games: 8
- Teams: 8
- TV partner(s): CBS Sports Network, CBS Sports, CW Sports, USA Sports

2027 NFL draft

Pac-12 Championship Game
- Date: December 4, 2026
- Venue: 1 Seed will host

Pac-12 seasons
- ← 2025 2027 →

2026 Pac-12 Conference football standings
	Conf.			Overall
Team	W		L	W		L
No. 17 Boise State y	6	–	1	9	–	2
San Diego State y	5	–	2	6	–	5
Texas State	5	–	2	7	–	4
Oregon State	4	–	3	6	–	5
Utah State	3	–	4	4	–	7
Fresno State	3	–	4	6	–	5
Washington State	1	–	6	2	–	9
Colorado State	1	–	6	3	–	8
Championship: San Diego State at Boise State
y – Championship game participant; As of November 22, 2026; Rankings from CFP rankings

The 2026 Pac-12 Conference football season is the 48th season of Pac-12 Conference football. The season began on September 4, 2026. It is the Pac-12's first season back after a two-year grace period granted by the NCAA due to the departure of 10 schools in 2024. Out of the eight schools participating in the rebuilt conference, six are new additions from the Mountain West and Sun Belt conferences.

== Conference realignment and the grace period ==
After the departure of 10 schools in 2024, the Pac-12 consisted of only two football playing schools; Oregon State and Washington State. The NCAA requires FBS conferences to consist of eight football playing schools at minimum, and thusly afforded the Pac-12 a two year period of recognition to reconstruct by 2026.

The two lone Pac-12 teams had to find creative scheduling solutions for the 2024 and 2025 seasons, for they lacked games traditionally played amongst their former conference mates. They began by securing a 6-game scheduling agreement with the Mountain West conference, a one year solution for the 2024 season. A second agreement for the 2025 season was not reached by the deadline of September 2, 2024.

Ten days later, on September 12, 2024, the conference announced football-playing institutions Boise State, Colorado State, Fresno State, and San Diego State would be joining. These additions brought the Pac-12 football membership to six. 11 days later, on September 23, the conference announced the addition of Utah State University, bringing the football membership to seven. The conference would still need to add one more school.

Failing to reach another scheduling agreement with the Mountain West for the 2025 season, Oregon State and Washington State chose to act as independents. Difficulty finding enough available opponents resulted in the two schools playing each other twice in the season, with the second meeting counting as the only "Pac-2" conference game of the year.

On June 30, 2025, the Pac-12 announced the addition of Texas State University out of the Sun Belt Conference, bringing the football-playing membership back up to the minimum eight football-sponsoring full members needed to be recognized by the NCAA as an FBS conference.

== Preseason ==
=== Recruiting classes ===
National rankings
Team	ESPN	Rivals	24/7	Total signees
Boise State	57	51	51	34
Colorado State	72	73	73	30
Fresno State	73	76	70	24
Oregon State	-	94	100	16
San Diego State	-	80	83	25
Texas State	-	74	74	22
Utah State	-	102	97	20
Washington State	-	130	130	14

Note: ESPN only ranks the top 75 teams.

==== Preseason media poll ====
This poll was organized by the Denver Gazette.

Pac-12
Predicted finish	Team	Votes (1st place)	Points
1	Boise State	14	19
2	San Diego State	1	38
3	Fresno State	1	50
4	Texas State	0	63
5	Washington State	0	77
6	Colorado State	0	107
6	Utah State	0	107
8	Oregon State	0	115

Note: A higher placement pick correlates to less points.

== Head coaches ==
=== Pre-season changes ===
Colorado State head coach Jay Norvell was fired on October 19, 2025, after a homecoming loss to Hawaii with 5 games left in the season. Defensive coordinator Tyson Summers took over as interim head coach for the rest of the season. On November 26, 2025, UConn head coach Jim Mora was hired to take over the head coaching position in 2026.

Oregon State head coach Trent Bray was fired on October 12, 2025, after an 0–7 start to the season. Robb Akey, who was hired as the special assistant to the head coach, and a week prior had taken over special teams after the dismissal of Jamie Christian, was promoted to interim head coach for the rest of the season. On November 28, 2025, Alabama assistant head coach JaMarcus Shepard was hired to take over the head coaching position in 2026.

On December 5, 2025, news broke that Washington State head coach Jimmy Rogers would be the next head coach for Iowa State. He had led Washington State to a bowl game with a sixth win in the final game of the regular season against Oregon State, but would not stay to coach the bowl game. Defensive coordinator Jesse Bobbit would be promoted to interim head coach for the bowl game, before following Rogers to Iowa State. On December 12, 2025, Missouri offensive coordinator Kirby Moore would be hired to take over the Cougars' head coaching position in 2026.

=== Coaches ===
Note: All stats current through the completion of the 2026 season. All records are at Division I schools only

Team	Head coach	Year at school	Overall record	Record at school	Pac-12 record	Conference Championships	National Championships
Boise State	Spencer Danielson	4	24–8	24–8	0–0	0	0
Colorado State	Jim L. Mora	1	73–53	0–0	0–0	0	0
Fresno State	Matt Entz	2	69–15	9–4	0–0	0	0
Oregon State	JaMarcus Shephard	1	0–0	0–0	0–0	0	0
San Diego State	Sean Lewis	3	36–44	12–13	0–0	0	0
Texas State	G. J. Kinne	4	35–18	23–16	0–0	0	0
Utah State	Bronco Mendenhall	2	146–95	6–7	0–0	0	0
Washington State	Kirby Moore	1	0–0	0–0	0–0	0	0

== Rankings ==
		Pre	Wk 1	Wk 2	Wk 3	Wk 4	Wk 5	Wk 6	Wk 7	Wk 8	Wk 9	Wk 10	Wk 11	Wk 12	Wk 13	Wk 14	Wk 15	Final
Boise State	AP	RV	RV	RV	RV	22	23	23	21	20т	20							
Boise State	C	RV	RV	RV	RV	RV	RV	24	22	22	21							
Boise State	CFP	Not released									25							
Colorado State	AP	—	—	—	—	—	—	—	—	—	—							
Colorado State	C	—	—	—	—	—	—	—	—	—	—							
Colorado State	CFP	Not released									—							
Fresno State	AP	—	—	—	—	—	—	—	—	—	—							
Fresno State	C	—	—	—	—	—	—	—	—	—	—							
Fresno State	CFP	Not released									—							
Oregon State	AP	—	—	—	—	—	—	RV	RV	RV	—							
Oregon State	C	—	—	—	—	—	—	RV	RV	RV	—							
Oregon State	CFP	Not released									—							
San Diego State	AP	—	—	—	—	—	—	—	—	—	—							
San Diego State	C	RV	RV	—	—	—	—	—	—	—	—							
San Diego State	CFP	Not released									—							
Texas State	AP	—	—	—	—	—	—	—	—	—	—							
Texas State	C	—	—	—	—	—	—	—	—	—	—							
Texas State	CFP	Not released									—							
Utah State	AP	—	—	—	—	—	—	—	—	—	—							
Utah State	C	—	—	—	—	—	—	—	—	—	—							
Utah State	CFP	Not released									—							
Washington State	AP	—	—	—	—	—	—	—	—	—	—							
Washington State	C	—	—	—	—	—	—	—	—	—	—							
Washington State	CFP	Not released									—							

Legend
	Improvement in ranking
	Drop in ranking
	Not ranked previous week
	No change in ranking from previous week
RV	Received votes but were not ranked in Top 25 of poll
т	Tied with team above or below also with this symbol

== Schedules ==
The schedule was released on February 9, 2026. The season will begin on September 4, 2026, and will end with the Pac-12 Championship Game on December 4, 2026.

Index to colors and formatting
Pac-12 member won
Pac-12 member lost
Pac-12 teams in **bold**

All times Pacific time.

† denotes Homecoming game

Rankings reflect the AP poll for weeks 1 through 8. Rankings from Week 9 until the end of the Season reflect the College Football Playoff Rankings.

=== Week One ===
Date	Time	Visiting team	Home team	Site	TV	Result	Attendance	Ref.
September 4	6:00 p.m.	**Fresno State**	No. 14т USC	LA Memorial Coliseum • Los Angeles, CA	FOX	**L** 0–39	53,014	
September 5	9:00 a.m.	**Oregon State**	No. 23 Houston	TDECU Stadium • Houston, TX	ESPN	**L** 20–33	28,742	
September 5	12:30 p.m.	**Boise State**	No. 2 Oregon	Autzen Stadium • Eugene, OR	CBS	**L** 27–34	57,652	
September 5	12:30 p.m.	**Texas State**	No. 5 Texas	Darrell K Royal–Texas Memorial Stadium • Austin, TX	ESPN	**L** 7–59	102,738	
September 5	3:00 p.m.	Wyoming	**Colorado State**	Canvas Stadium • Fort Collins, CO (Border War)	USA	**W** 35–13	40,546	
September 5	4:00 p.m.	No. 23 (FCS) Idaho State	**Utah State**	Maverik Stadium • Logan, UT	CBSSN	**L** 17–29	20,723	
September 5	6:30 p.m.	Portland State	**San Diego State**	Snapdragon Stadium • San Diego, CA	USA	**W** 53–20	26,913	
September 6	1:00 p.m.	**Washington State**	No. 17 Washington	Husky Stadium • Seattle, WA (Apple Cup)	NBC	**L** 10–24	71,056	
^{#}Rankings from AP Poll released prior to game. All times are in Pacific Time.

=== Week Two ===
Date	Time	Visiting team	Home team	Site	TV	Result	Attendance	Ref.
September 12	9:00 a.m.	**Washington State**	Kansas State	Bill Snyder Family Stadium • Manhattan, KS	TNT	**L** 7–34	51,759	
September 12	12:30 p.m.	UTSA	**Texas State**	UFCU Stadium • San Marcos, TX (I-35 Rivalry)	The CW	**L** 26–31	22,019	
September 12	12:30 p.m.	**Utah State**	No. 19 Washington	Husky Stadium • Seattle, WA	BTN	**L** 14–16	62,152	
September 12	3:00 p.m.	Memphis	**Boise State**	Albertsons Stadium • Boise, ID	USA	**W** 38–20	34,439	
September 12	4:00 p.m.	Southern Utah	**Colorado State**	Canvas Stadium • Fort Collins, CO	CBSSN	**W** 58–24	35,749	
September 12	4:15 p.m.	**San Diego State**	UCLA	Rose Bowl • Pasadena, CA	BTN	**L** 10–28	31,973	
September 12	4:30 p.m.	No. 13 Texas Tech	**Oregon State**	Reser Stadium • Corvallis, OR	CBS	**L** 24–35	30,539	
September 12	7:30 p.m.	Sacramento State	**Fresno State**	Valley Children's Stadium • Fresno, CA	CBSSN	**W** 49–3	40,198	
^{#}Rankings from AP Poll released prior to game. All times are in Pacific Time.

=== Week Three ===
Date	Time	Visiting team	Home team	Site	TV	Result	Attendance	Ref.
September 19	9:00 a.m.	North Texas	**Texas State**	UFCU Stadium • San Marcos, TX	USA	**W** 49–35	14,166	
September 19	12:30 p.m.	Duquesne	**Washington State**	Martin Stadium • Pullman, WA	USA	**W** 48–7	28,288	
September 19	12:30 p.m.	**Utah State**	No. 17 Utah	Rice-Eccles Stadium • Salt Lake City, UT (Battle of the Brothers)	FOX	**L** 0–33	51,455	
September 19	4:30 p.m.	No. 11 BYU	**Colorado State**	Canvas Stadium • Fort Collins, CO	CBS	**L** 23–41	38,759	
September 19	7:00 p.m.	James Madison	**San Diego State**	Snapdragon Stadium • San Diego, CA	The CW	**L** 13–26	26,487	
September 19	7:00 p.m.	No. 10 (FCS) South Dakota	**Boise State**	Albertsons Stadium • Boise, ID	CBSSN	**W** 38–24	34,428	
September 19	8:00 p.m.	No. 3 (FCS) Montana	**Oregon State**	Reser Stadium • Corvallis, OR	USA	**W** 52–17	34,030	
September 19	8:00 p.m.	**Fresno State**	San Jose State	CEFCU Stadium • San Jose, CA (Battle for the Valley)	FS1	**W** 26–10	18,256	
^{#}Rankings from AP Poll released prior to game. All times are in Pacific Time.

=== Week Four ===
Date	Time	Visiting team	Home team	Site	TV	Result	Attendance	Ref.
September 26	9:00 a.m.	**San Diego State**	Toledo	Glass Bowl • Toldeo, OH	CBSSN	**L** 16–41	22,126	
September 26	9:00 a.m.	**Colorado State**	UTSA	Alamodome • San Antonio, TX	ESPNU	**L** 45–59	17,109	
September 26	12:30 p.m.	**Boise State**	Western Michigan	Waldo Stadium • Kalamazoo, MI	ESPN2	**W** 32–7	29,700	
September 26	3:00 p.m.	Incarnate Word	**Texas State**	UFCU Stadium • San Marcos, TX	USA	**W** 63–10	23,594	
September 26	4:30 p.m.	Arizona	**Washington State**	Martin Stadium • Pullman, WA	CBS	**L** 24–34	23,903	
September 26	4:30 p.m.	Troy	**Utah State**	Maverik Stadium • Logan, UT	CBSSN	**W** 21–10	22,037	
September 26	6:00 p.m.	**Oregon State**	UTEP	Sun Bowl • El Paso, TX	MW+	**W** 33–7	15,099	
September 26	7:00 p.m.	Rice	**Fresno State**	Valley Children's Stadium • Fresno, CA	The CW	**W** 38–24	39,001	
^{#}Rankings from AP Poll released prior to game. All times are in Pacific Time.

=== Week Five ===
Date	Time	Visiting team	Home team	Site	TV	Result	Attendance	Ref.
October 3	3:00 p.m.	**Oregon State**	**Colorado State**	Canvas Stadium • Fort Collins, CO	USA	**OSU** 56–26	41,000	
October 3	4:30 p.m.	**Utah State**	No. 22 **Boise State**	Albertsons Stadium • Boise, ID	CBSSN	**BSU** 37–18	34,616	
October 3	6:30 p.m.	**Fresno State**	**Washington State**	Martin Stadium • Pullman, WA	USA	**FRES** 26–6	26,471	
October 3	7:30 p.m.	**Texas State**	**San Diego State**	Snapdragon Stadium • San Diego, CA	The CW	**SDSU** 31–29	28,474	
^{#}Rankings from AP Poll released prior to game. All times are in Pacific Time.

=== Week Six ===
Date	Time	Visiting team	Home team	Site	TV	Result	Attendance	Ref.
October 9	6:00 p.m.	**Washington State**	**Utah State**	Maverik Stadium • Logan, UT	The CW	**USU** 17–16	20,806	
October 10	3:00 p.m.	**San Diego State**	**Oregon State**	Reser Stadium • Corvallis, OR	USA	**OSU** 66–14	37,361	
October 10	7:30 p.m.	No. 23 **Boise State**	**Fresno State**	Valley Children's Stadium • Fresno, CA (rivalry)	The CW	**BSU** 38–31	43,086	
^{#}Rankings from AP Poll released prior to game. All times are in Pacific Time.

=== Week Seven ===
Date	Time	Visiting team	Home team	Site	TV	Result	Attendance	Ref.
October 15	5:00 p.m.	**Colorado State**	**Texas State**	UFCU Stadium • San Marcos, TX	CBSSN	**TXST** 66–27	16,229	
October 17	3:00 p.m.	**Washington State**	**Oregon State**	Reser Stadium • Corvallis, OR	USA	**OSU** 48–30	39,257	
October 17	7:30 p.m.	**Fresno State**	**San Diego State**	Snapdragon Stadium • San Diego, CA (rivalry)	CBSSN	**SDSU** 26–23	21,847	
^{#}Rankings from AP Poll released prior to game. All times are in Pacific Time.

=== Week Eight ===
Date	Time	Visiting team	Home team	Site	TV	Result	Attendance	Ref.
October 24	3:00 p.m.	No. 21 **Boise State**	**Washington State**	Martin Stadium • Pullman, WA	USA	**BSU** 31–10	2,730	
October 24	3:30 p.m.	**San Diego State**	**Colorado State**	Canvas Stadium • Fort Collins, CO	The CW	**CSU** 56–49	33,720	
October 24	4:30 p.m.	**Utah State**	**Texas State**	UFCU Stadium • San Marcos, TX	CBSSN	**TXST** 20–17	18,587	
^{#}Rankings from AP Poll released prior to game. All times are in Pacific Time.

=== Week Nine ===
Date	Time	Visiting team	Home team	Site	TV	Result	Attendance	Ref.
October 31	12:30 p.m.	**Colorado State**	**Utah State**	Maverik Stadium • Logan, UT	USA	**USU** 31–14		
October 31	4:00 p.m.	**Washington State**	**San Diego State**	Snapdragon Stadium • San Diego, CA	CBSSN	**SDSU** 26–20		
October 31	7:00 p.m.	**Texas State**	No. 20т **Boise State**	Albertsons Stadium • Boise, ID	The CW	**BSU** 46–45		
October 31	8:00 p.m.	**Oregon State**	**Fresno State**	Valley Children's Stadium • Fresno, CA	USA	**FRES** 38–22		
^{#}Rankings from AP Poll released prior to game. All times are in Pacific Time.

=== Week Ten ===
Date	Time	Visiting team	Home team	Site	TV	Result	Attendance	Ref.
November 7	3:00 p.m.	No. 20 **Boise State**	**Colorado State**	Canvas Stadium • Fort Collins, CO	USA	**BSU** 64–38		
November 7	6:30 p.m.	**Fresno State**	**Utah State**	Maverik Stadium • Logan, UT	USA	**USU** 17–10		
November 7	7:30 p.m.	**Texas State**	**Oregon State**	Reser Stadium • Corvallis, OR	The CW	**TXST** 42–21		
^{#}Rankings from AP Poll released prior to game. All times are in Pacific Time.

=== Week Eleven ===
Date	Time	Visiting team	Home team	Site	TV	Result	Attendance	Ref.
November 14	1:00 p.m.	**Fresno State**	**Texas State**	UFCU Stadium • San Marcos, TX	The CW	**TXST** 37–35		
November 14	3:00 p.m.	**Oregon State**	No. 24 **Boise State**	Albertsons Stadium • Boise, ID	USA	**BSU** 46–41		
November 14	6:30 p.m.	**Utah State**	**San Diego State**	Snapdragon Stadium • San Diego, CA	USA	**SDSU** 30–13		
November 14	7:30 p.m.	**Colorado State**	**Washington State**	Martin Stadium • Pullman, WA	CBSSN	**WSU** 73–7		
^{#}Rankings from AP Poll released prior to game. All times are in Pacific Time.

=== Week Twelve ===
Date	Time	Visiting team	Home team	Site	TV	Result	Attendance	Ref.
November 21	3:00 p.m.	**Washington State**	**Texas State**	UFCU Stadium • San Marcos, TX	USA	**TXST** 42–14		
November 21	4:30 p.m.	**Colorado State**	**Fresno State**	Valley Children's Stadium • Fresno, CA	The CW	**FRES** 49–42		
November 21	6:30 p.m.	**San Diego State**	**Boise State**	Albertsons Stadium • Boise, ID	USA	**SDSU** 22–20		
November 21	7:30 p.m.	**Utah State**	**Oregon State**	Reser Stadium • Corvallis, OR	CBSSN	**OSU** 31–24		
^{#}Rankings from AP Poll released prior to game. All times are in Pacific Time.

=== Week Thirteen ===
Date	Time	Visiting team	Home team	Site	TV	Result	Attendance	Ref.
November 28	3:00 p.m.	**Boise State**	**Colorado State**	Canvas Stadium • Fort Collins, CO	USA			
November 28	3:30 p.m.	**San Diego State**	**Washington State**	Martin Stadium • Pullman, WA	The CW			
November 28	6:30 p.m.	**Texas State**	**Utah State**	Maverik Stadium • Logan, UT	USA			
November 28	7:00 p.m.	**Oregon State**	**Fresno State**	Valley Children's Stadium • Fresno, CA	The CW			
^{#}Rankings from AP Poll released prior to game. All times are in Pacific Time.

== Head to head matchups ==
2026 Pac-12 Head to head matchups
Team	Boise State	Colorado State	Fresno State	Oregon State	San Diego State	Texas State	Utah State	Washington State
vs. Boise State	—							
vs. Colorado State		—						
vs. Fresno State			—					
vs. Oregon State				—				
vs. San Diego State					—			
vs. Texas State						—		
vs. Utah State							—	
vs. Washington State								—
Total	0–0	0–0	0–0	0–0	0–0	0–0	0–0	0–0
	BSU	CSU	FSU	OSU	SDSU	TXST	USU	WSU

Updated after the season.

== Pac-12 vs other conferences ==
=== Pac-12 vs Power Four matchups ===
The following games include Pac-12 teams competing against Power Four teams from the ACC, Big Ten, Big 12, SEC, and Notre Dame. All rankings are from the AP Poll at the time of the game.

Date	Conference	Visitor	Home	Site	Score
September 4	Big Ten	Fresno State	No. 14t USC	Los Angeles Memorial Coliseum • Los Angeles, CA	L 0–39
September 5	Big 12	Oregon State	No. 23 Houston	TDECU Stadium • Houston, TX	L 20–33
September 5	SEC	Texas State	No. 5 Texas	Darrell K Royal–Texas Memorial Stadium • Austin, TX	L 7–59
September 5	Big Ten	Boise State	No. 2 Oregon	Autzen Stadium • Eugene, OR	L 27–34
September 6	Big Ten	Washington State	No. 17 Washington	Husky Stadium • Seattle, WA	L 10–24
September 12	Big Ten	Utah State	No. 19 Washington	Husky Stadium • Seattle, WA	L 14–16
September 12	Big Ten	San Diego State	UCLA	Rose Bowl • Pasadena, CA	L 10–28
September 12	Big 12	Washington State	Kansas State	Bill Snyder Family Stadium • Manhattan, KS	L 7–34
September 12	Big 12	No. 13 Texas Tech	Oregon State	Reser Stadium • Corvallis, OR	L 24–35
September 19	Big 12	Utah State	Utah	Rice-Eccles Stadium • Salt Lake City, UT	L 0–33
September 19	Big 12	BYU	Colorado State	Canvas Stadium • Fort Collins, CO	L 23–41
September 26	Big 12	Arizona	Washington State	Martin Stadium • Pullman, WA	L 24–34

=== Pac-12 vs Group of Six matchups ===
The following games include Pac-12 teams competing against "Group of Six" teams from the American, CUSA, MAC, Mountain West, and Sun Belt.

Date	Conference	Visitor	Home	Site	Score
September 5	Mountain West	Wyoming	Colorado State	Canvas Stadium • Fort Collins, CO	W 35–13
September 12	American	UTSA	Texas State	UFCU Stadium • San Marcos, TX	L 26–31
September 12	American	Memphis	Boise State	Albertsons Stadium • Boise, ID	W 38–20
September 12	MAC	Sacramento State	Fresno State	Valley Children's Stadium • Fresno, CA	W 49–3
September 19	Sun Belt	JMU	San Diego State	Snapdragon Stadium • San Diego, CA	L 13–26
September 19	American	North Texas	Texas State	UFCU Stadium • San Marcos, TX	W 49–35
September 19	Mountain West	Fresno State	San Jose State	CEFCU Stadium • San Jose, CA	W 26–10
September 26	Sun Belt	Troy	Utah State	Maverik Stadium • Logan, UT	W 21–10
September 26	MAC	Boise State	Western Michigan	Waldo Stadium • Kalamazoo, MI	W 32–7
September 26	MAC	San Diego State	Toledo	Glass Bowl • Toledo, OH	L 16–41
September 26	American	Colorado State	UTSA	Alamodome • San Antonio, TX	L 45–59
September 26	Mountain West	Oregon State	UTEP	Sun Bowl • El Paso, TX	W 33–7
September 26	American	Rice	Fresno State	Valley Children's Stadium • Fresno, CA	W 38–24

=== Pac-12 vs FCS matchups ===
The Football Championship Subdivision comprises 13 conferences and two independent programs. The following games include Pac-12 teams competing against FCS teams from the Big Sky, Missouri Valley, NEC, and SLC.

Date	Conference	Visitor	Home	Site	Score
September 5	Big Sky	No. 23 (FCS) Idaho State	Utah State	Maverik Stadium • Logan, UT	L 17–29
September 5	Big Sky	Portland State	San Diego State	Snapdragon Stadium • San Diego, CA	W 53–20
September 12	Big Sky	Southern Utah	Colorado State	Canvas Stadium • Fort Collins, CO	W 58–24
September 19	NEC	Duquesne	Washington State	Martin Stadium • Pullman, WA	W 48–7
September 19	MVFC	South Dakota	Boise State	Albertsons Stadium • Boise, ID	W 38–24
September 19	Big Sky	Montana	Oregon State	Reser Stadium • Corvallis, OR	W 52–17
September 26	SLC	UIW	Texas State	UFCU Stadium • San Marcos, TX	W 63–10

=== Record vs. other conferences ===
Regular Season

Power Four Conferences	Record
ACC	0–0
Big 12	0–6
Big Ten	0–5
Notre Dame	0–0
SEC	0–1
Power 5 Total	0–12
Other FBS Conferences	Record
American	3–2
CUSA	0–0
Independents (Excluding Notre Dame)	0–0
MAC	2–1
Mountain West	3–0
Sun Belt	1–1
Other FBS Total	9–4
FCS Opponents	Record
Football Championship Subdivision	6–1
Total Non-Conference Record	15–17

Post Season

Power 4 Conferences	Record
ACC	0–0
Big Ten	0–0
Big 12	0–0
SEC	0–0
Power 4 Total	0–0
Other FBS Conferences	Record
American	0–0
CUSA	0–0
Independents (Excluding Notre Dame)	0–0
MAC	0–0
Mountain West	0–0
Sun Belt	0–0
Other FBS Total	0–0
Total Bowl Record	0–0

== Home game attendance ==
Team	Stadium	Capacity	Game 1	Game 2	Game 3	Game 4	Game 5	Game 6	Game 7	Total	Average	% of Capacity
Boise State	Albertsons Stadium	36,387	34,439	34,428	35,616	34,429			—N/a			
Colorado State	Canvas Stadium	36,500	40,546	35,749	38,759	41,000	33,720					
Fresno State	Valley Children's Stadium	40,727	40,198	39,001	43,086	32,501			—N/a			
Oregon State	Reser Stadium	35,548	30,539	34,030	37,361	39,257			—N/a			
San Diego State	Snapdragon Stadium	35,000	26,913	26,487	28,474	21,847	19,184		—N/a			
Texas State	UFCU Stadium	28,388	22,019	14,166	23,594	16,229	18,587					
Utah State	Maverik Stadium	25,513	20,723	22,037	20,806	15,835			—N/a			
Washington State	Martin Stadium	32,952	28,288	23,903	26,471	27,300			—N/a			
