= 2026 Texas State Bobcats football team =

American college football season

2026 Texas State Bobcats football
- Conference: Pac-12 Conference
- Record: 7–4 (5–2 Pac-12)
- Head coach: G. J. Kinne (4th season)
- Offensive coordinator: Landon Keopple (2nd season)
- Co-offensive coordinator: Jordan Shoemaker (2nd season)
- Offensive scheme: Run and gun
- Defensive coordinator: Will Windham (1st season)
- Co-defensive coordinator: Matthew Gregg (1st season)
- Base defense: Multiple 4–2–5
- Home stadium: UFCU Stadium

2026 Pac-12 Conference football standings
	Conf.			Overall
Team	W		L	W		L
No. 17 Boise State y	6	–	1	9	–	2
San Diego State y	5	–	2	6	–	5
Texas State	5	–	2	7	–	4
Oregon State	4	–	3	6	–	5
Utah State	3	–	4	4	–	7
Fresno State	3	–	4	6	–	5
Washington State	1	–	6	2	–	9
Colorado State	1	–	6	3	–	8
Championship: San Diego State at Boise State
y – Championship game participant; As of November 22, 2026; Rankings from CFP rankings

The 2026 Texas State Bobcats football team represents Texas State University as a member of the Pac-12 Conference during the 2026 NCAA Division I FBS football season. The team is led by their fourth-year head coach G. J. Kinne, and play their home games at UFCU Stadium in San Marcos, Texas.

This is the Bobcats' first season in the Pac-12, having turned down an invitation to join the Mountain West Conference, after they were in the Sun Belt Conference for 13 years.

== Offseason ==
=== Coaching changes ===
On December 19, 2025, Will Windham was hired to be the new defensive coordinator of the Bobcats.

=== Transfers ===
==== Outgoing ====
Player	Position	Destination
Keldric Luster	QB	Ball State
Kamren Washington	DL	Baylor
Devarrick Woods	DL	Clemson
Jordan Sanders	DL	Florida State
Javis Mynatt	S	James Madison
Tellek Lockette	IOL	Maryland
Chantz Johnson	LB	North Texas
Brock Riker	IOL	Penn State
Holden Geriner	QB	Pittsburgh
Ty Mims	WR	UAB
L.J. Johnson Jr.	WR	Utah State
Tyler Robles	K	Washington
Khamari Terrell	CB	Washington State
Kalil Alexander	EDGE	Unknown
Kyran Boudra	DL	Unknown
Bobby Crosby	S	Unknown
Amipeleasi Fifita	DL	Unknown
Jermy Jackson Jr.	EDGE	Unknown
Tymere Jackson	EDGE	Unknown
Jaylen Jenkins	RB	Unknown
Charlie Leota	DL	Unknown
Ryan Nolan	S	Withdrawn

==== Incoming ====
Player	Position	Previous school
Kaleb James	DL	Arkansas
Javante Mackey	LB	Arkansas State
Jordan Sample	LB	Arkansas State
Chancellor Owens	DL	Arizona
Zechariah Sample	WR	Arizona State
Shaker Reisig	QB	Boston College
Jaylen Harris	DL	Central Missouri
John Smith	S	Colorado State
Dexter Ricks Jr.	CB	Liberty
Tae Woody	DL	Louisiana–Monroe
Phillip Bradford	DL	McNeese
Davian Jackson	WR	Mississippi State
Jaylen Early	IOL	Missouri
Josiah Graham	EDGE	Monmouth
William Boone	OT	North Carolina
Michael Patterson III	CB	Stephen F. Austin
Rasheed Jackson	OT	TCU
Jason Patterson	EDGE	Texas Southern
Dylan Cunanan	K	Toledo
Mekhi Buchanan	EDGE	Virginia

== Schedule ==
Date	Time	Opponent	Site	TV	Result	Attendance
September 5	2:30 p.m.	at No. 5 Texas*	Darrell K Royal–Texas Memorial Stadium; Austin, TX	ESPN	L 7–59	102,738
September 12	2:30 p.m.	UTSA*	UFCU Stadium; San Marcos, TX (I-35 Rivalry)	The CW	L 26–31	22,019
September 19	11:00 a.m.	North Texas*	UFCU Stadium; San Marcos, TX	USA	W 49–35	14,166
September 26	5:00 p.m.	Incarnate Word*	UFCU Stadium; San Marcos, TX	USA	W 63–10	23,594
October 3	9:30 p.m.	at San Diego State	Snapdragon Stadium; San Diego, CA	The CW	L 29–31	28,474
October 15	7:00 p.m.	Colorado State	UFCU Stadium; San Marcos, TX	CBSSN	W 66–27	16,229
October 24	6:30 p.m.	Utah State^{†}	UFCU Stadium; San Marcos, TX	CBSSN	W 20–17	18,587
October 31	9:00 p.m.	at No. 20т Boise State	Albertsons Stadium; Boise, ID	The CW	L 45–46	34,329
November 7	9:30 p.m.	at Oregon State	Reser Stadium; Corvallis, OR	The CW	W 42–21	36,714
November 14	3:00 p.m.	Fresno State	UFCU Stadium; San Marcos, TX	The CW	W 37–35	15,226
November 21	5:00 p.m.	Washington State	UFCU Stadium; San Marcos, TX	USA	W 42–14	23,627
November 28	8:30 p.m.	at Utah State (Note: In the 2026 season, the Pac-12 will use a "flex" scheduling model for Week 13. After the round-robin conference schedule, the conference will determine the pairings for Week 13. "Flex" games will not count in the conference standings.)*	Maverik Stadium; Logan, UT	USA		
*Non-conference game; ^{†}Homecoming; Rankings from AP Poll (and CFP Rankings, after November 4) - Released prior to game; All times are in Central time

== Game summaries ==
=== at No. 5 Texas ===
Texas State Bobcats (0–0) at No. 5 Texas Longhorns (0–0) – Game summary

Quarter	1	2	3	4	Total
Bobcats	0	7	0	0	7
No. 5 Longhorns	14	14	21	10	59

at Darrell K Royal–Texas Memorial Stadium • Austin, Texas

- Date: September 5
- Game time: 2:30 p.m. CDT
- Game weather: Sunny • Temperature: 96 °F (36 °C)
- Game attendance: 102,738
- Referee: Jeff Heaser
- TV announcers (ESPN): Roy Philpott, Brock Osweiler and Sherree Burruss

Game information

First quarter

- (10:31) TEX – Cam Coleman 6-yard pass from Arch Manning (Gianni Spetic kick), (Drive: 4 plays, 56 yards, 1:48; Texas 7–0)
- (4:14) TEX – Ryan Wingo 8-yard pass from Arch Manning (Gianni Spetic kick), (Drive: 7 plays, 58 yards, 2:32; Texas 14–0)

Second quarter

- (7:53) TEX – Raleek Brown 13-yard run (Gianni Spetic kick), (Drive: 13 plays, 80 yards, 6:18; Texas 21–0)
- (5:56) TEX – Graceson Littleton 59-yard fumble return (Gianni Spetic kick), (Drive: 5 plays, 28 yards, 1:51; Texas 28–0)
- (3:59) TXST – Davian Jackson 4-yard run (Dylan Cunanan kick), (Drive: 5 plays, 75 yards, 1:57; Texas 28–7)

Third quarter

- (12:46) TEX – Cam Coleman 6-yard pass from Arch Manning (Gianni Spetic kick), (Drive: 6 plays, 75 yards, 2:14; Texas 35–7)
- (7:55) TEX – Hollywood Smothers 13-yard pass from Arch Manning (Gianni Spetic kick), (Drive: 9 plays, 42 yards, 4:04; Texas 42–7)
- (5:00) TEX – Raleek Brown 21-yard run (Gianni Spetic kick), (Drive: 3 plays, 45 yards, 1:03; Texas 49–7)

Fourth quarter

- (6:00) TEX – Gianni Spetic 48-yard field goal (Drive: 12 plays, 50 yards, 5:48; Texas 52–7)
- (5:00) TEX – James Simon 7-yard run (Gianni Spetic kick), (Drive: 4 plays, 16 yards, 1:54; Texas 59–7)

Statistics	TXST	TEX
First downs	18	26
Plays–yards	70–349	70–516
Rushes–yards	41–161	36–156
Passing yards	188	360
Passing: comp–att–int	20–29–1	26–34–1
Turnovers	3	1
Time of possession	30:26	29:34

Team	Category	Player	Statistics
Texas State	Passing	Brad Jackson	15–23, 150 yards, INT
Texas State	Rushing	Jaylen Jenkins	6 carries, 34 yards
Texas State	Receiving	Tucker Cusano	3 receptions, 58 yards
Texas	Passing	Arch Manning	20–27, 305 yards, 4 TD, INT
Texas	Rushing	Hollywood Smothers	10 carries, 70 yards
Texas	Receiving	Ryan Wingo	7 receptions, 121 yards, TD

=== UTSA (I–35 Rivalry) ===
UTSA Roadrunners (1–0) at Texas State Bobcats (0–1) – Game summary

Quarter	1	2	3	4	Total
Roadrunners	7	0	10	14	31
Bobcats	0	17	6	3	26

at UFCU Stadium • San Marcos, Texas

- Date: September 12
- Game time: 2:30 p.m. CDT
- Game weather: Sunny
- Game attendance: 22,019
- Referee: John Love
- TV announcers (CW): Rick Allen, Will Blackmon and Michael Bumpus

Game information

First quarter

- (4:54) UTSA - Brandon Young Jr. 1-yard pass from Owen McCown (Michael Petro kick), (Drive: 11 plays, 48 yards, 5:06; UTSA 7-0)

Second quarter

- (13:09) TXST - Davian Jackson 16-yard run (Jacob Bonilla kick), (Drive: 2 plays, 81 yards, 0:33; Tied 7-7)
- (7:16) TXST - Brad Jackson 6-yard run (Jacob Bonilla kick), (Drive: 8 plays, 49 yards, 2:32; Texas State 14-7)
- (0:00) TXST - Jacob Bonilla 51-yard field goal, (Drive: 10 plays, 47 yards, 2:14; Texas State 17-7)

Third quarter

- (13:01) UTSA - Mekhi Anderson 44-yard pass from David Amador II (Michael Petro kick), (Drive: 6 plays, 75 yards, 1:59; Texas State 17-14)
- (7:46) UTSA - Michael Petro 34-yard field goal, (Drive: 7 plays, 22 yards, 2:15; Tied 17-17)
- (0:00) TXST - Chris Dawn Jr. 13-yard pass from Brad Jackson (Dylan Cunanan PAT failed), (Drive: 7 plays, 60 yards, 2:37; Texas State 23-17)

Fourth quarter

- (11:54) UTSA - A'Marion Peterson 2-yard run (Michael Petro kick), (Drive: 7 plays, 65 yards, 3:00; UTSA 24-23)
- (4:36) TXST - Jacob Bonilla 26-yard field goal, (Drive: 14 plays, 67 yards, 7:18; Texas State 26-24)
- (0:14) UTSA - Brandon High Jr. 25-yard run (Michael Petro kick), (Drive: 14 plays, 82 yards, 4:17; UTSA 31-26)

Statistics	UTSA	TXST
First downs	22	27
Plays–yards	74–398	80–481
Rushes–yards	31–140	50–289
Passing yards	258	192
Passing: Comp–Att–Int	29–43–0	17–30–2
Turnovers	0	3
Time of possession	28:20	31:40

Team	Category	Player	Statistics
UTSA	Passing	Owen McCown	28/42, 214 yards, TD
UTSA	Rushing	Will Henderson III	14 carries, 80 yards
UTSA	Receiving	Mekhi Anderson	5 receptions, 83 yards, TD
Texas State	Passing	Brad Jackson	17/30, 192 yards, TD, 2 INT
Texas State	Rushing	Torrance Burgess Jr.	17 carries, 149 yards
Texas State	Receiving	Kylen Evans	5 receptions, 96 yards

=== North Texas ===
North Texas Mean Green (1–1) at Texas State Bobcats (0–2) – Game summary

Quarter	1	2	3	4	Total
Mean Green	7	21	0	7	35
Bobcats	21	7	7	14	49

at UFCU Stadium • San Marcos, Texas

- Date: September 19
- Game time: 11:00 a.m. CDT
- Game weather: Sunny
- Game attendance: 14,166
- Referee: Chris Wiggins
- TV announcers (USA): Nate Gatter, Ryan Leaf and Lauren Green

Game information

First quarter

- (10:53) TXST - Chris Dawn Jr. 12-yard pass from Brad Jackson (Jacob Bonilla kick), (Drive: 10 plays, 75 yards, 4:07; Texas State 7-0)
- (8:43) TXST - Chris Dawn Jr. 39-yard pass from Brad Jackson (Jacob Bonilla kick), (Drive: 3 plays, 62 yards, 0:36; Texas State 14-0)
- (3:18) UNT - Jahiem White 1-yard run (Dominic De Freitas kick), (Drive: 9 plays, 75 yards, 5:25; Texas State 14-7)
- (0:42) TXST - Davian Jackson 1-yard run (Jacob Bonilla kick), (Drive: 6 plays, 85 yards, 2:30; Texas State 21-7)

Second quarter

- (12:13) UNT - Kyle Koch 13-yard pass from Tayven Jackson (Dominic De Freitas kick), (Drive: 8 plays, 65 yards, 3:21; Texas State 21-14)
- (5:25) UNT - Brendon Haygood 2-yard run (Dominic De Freitas kick), (Drive: 10 plays, 93 yards, 3:34; Tied 21-21)
- (3:20) TXST - Blake Smith 41-yard pass from Brad Jackson (Jacob Bonilla kick), (Drive: 5 plays, 62 yards, 1:56; Texas State 28-21)
- (0:47) UNT - Corri Milliner 5-yard pass from Tayven Jackson (Dominic De Freitas kick), (Drive: 9 plays, 75 yards, 2:33; Tied 28-28)

Third quarter

- (4:10) TXST - Davian Jackson 1-yard run (Jacob Bonilla kick), (Drive: 8 plays, 67 yards, 3:20; Texas State 35-28)

Fourth quarter

- (8:14) TXST - Davian Jackson 13-yard pass from Brad Jackson (Jacob Bonilla kick), (Drive: 12 plays, 89 yards, 5:47; Texas State 42-28)
- (5:24) UNT - Jahiem White 18-yard pass from Tayven Jackson (Dominic De Freitas kick), (Drive: 7 plays, 75 yards, 2:50; Texas State 42-35)
- (3:07) TXST - Davian Jackson 57-yard run (Jacob Bonilla kick), (Drive: 5 plays, 80 yards, 2:14; Texas State 49-35)

Statistics	UNT	TXST
First downs	33	30
Plays–yards	85–605	71–605
Rushes–yards	29–113	49–337
Passing yards	492	268
Passing: Comp–Att–Int	42–56–1	16–22–0
Turnovers	2	0
Time of possession	32:35	27:25

Team	Category	Player	Statistics
North Texas	Passing	Tayven Jackson	43/57, 483 yards, 3 TD, INT
North Texas	Rushing	Brendon Haygood	11 carries, 50 yards, TD
North Texas	Receiving	Justin Stevenson	10 receptions, 122 yards
Texas State	Passing	Brad Jackson	16/22, 268 yards, 4 TD
Texas State	Rushing	Torrance Burgess Jr.	25 carries, 214 yards
Texas State	Receiving	Chris Dawn Jr.	4 receptions, 107 yards, 2 TD

=== Incarnate Word (FCS) ===
Incarnate Word Cardinals (FCS) (2–1) at Texas State Bobcats (1–2) – Game summary

Quarter	1	2	3	4	Total
Cardinals (FCS)	7	3	0	0	10
Bobcats	28	14	0	21	63

at UFCU Stadium • San Marcos, Texas

- Date: September 26
- Game time: 5:00 p.m. CDT
- Game weather: Sunny
- Game attendance: 23,594
- Referee: Gary Reed
- TV announcers (USA): Nate Gatter, Ryan Leaf and Lauren Green

Game information

First quarter

- (13:26) TXST - Beau Sparks 63-yard pass from Brad Jackson (Jacob Bonilla kick), (Drive: 4 plays, 80 yards, 1:28; Texas State 7-0)
- (10:55) UIW - Roy Alexander 32-yard pass from Emmett Brown (Nick Rigas kick), (Drive: 7 plays, 75 yards, 2:31; Tied 7-7)
- (9:07) TXST - Jordan Martin 10-yard pass from Brad Jackson (Jacob Bonilla kick), (Drive: 4 plays, 84 yards, 1:42; Texas State 14-7)
- (6:30) TXST - Davian Jackson 6-yard pass from Brad Jackson (Jacob Bonilla kick), (Drive: 6 plays, 31 yards, 1:51; Texas State 21-7)
- (2:22) TXST - Torrance Burgess Jr. 46-yard run (Jacob Bonilla kick), (Drive: 6 plays, 88 yards, 2:01; Texas State 28-7)

Second quarter

- (10:42) TXST - Chris Dawn Jr. 6-yard pass from Brad Jackson (Jacob Bonilla kick), (Drive: 12 plays, 73 yards, 4:45; Texas State 35-7)
- (2:44) TXST - Zechariah Sample 69-yard pass from Brad Jackson (Jacob Bonilla kick), (Drive: 4 plays, 80 yards, 1:27; Texas State 42-7)
- (0:00) UIW - Nick Rigas 23-yard field goal, (Drive: 16 plays, 70 yards, 2:43; Texas State 42-10)

Third quarter

- No scoring plays

Fourth quarter

- (12:18) TXST - La'Keyleon Graves 49-yard pass from Gavin Parkhurst (Jacob Bonilla kick), (Drive: 2 plays, 68 yards, 0:36; Texas State 49-10)
- (3:46) TXST - Juntavious Harris 45-yard run (Jacob Bonilla kick), (Drive: 3 plays, 72 yards, 1:27; Texas State 56-10)
- (1:39) TXST - Dameon Crowe 77-yard punt return (Jacob Bonilla kick), (Drive: 3 plays, 5 yards, 1:59; Texas State 63-10)

Statistics	UIW	TXST
First downs	23	25
Total yards	358	658
Rushing yards	75	338
Passing yards	283	320
Passing: Comp–Att–Int	29–53–2	20–23–0
Turnovers	2	1
Time of possession	30:27	29:33

Team	Category	Player	Statistics
Incarnate Word	Passing	Emmett Brown	24/44, 242 yards, TD, INT
Incarnate Word	Rushing	Lontrell Turner	5 carries, 23 yards
Incarnate Word	Receiving	Roy Alexander	3 receptions, 67 yards, TD
Texas State	Passing	Brad Jackson	17/20, 244 yards, 5 TD
Texas State	Rushing	Torrance Burgess Jr.	9 carries, 140 yards, TD
Texas State	Receiving	Zechariah Sample	4 receptions, 92 yards, TD

=== at San Diego State ===
Texas State Bobcats (2–2) at San Diego State Aztecs (1–3) – Game summary

Quarter	1	2	3	4	Total
Bobcats	10	7	0	12	29
Aztecs	3	0	21	7	31

at Snapdragon Stadium • San Diego, California

- Date: October 3
- Game time: 9:30 p.m. CDT / 7:30 p.m. PDT
- Game weather: Clear, 92 °F (33 °C)
- Game attendance: 28,474
- Referee: John Love
- TV announcers (CW): Rick Allen, Will Blackmon, and Michael Bumpus
- Box score, Recap

Game information
First quarter
- TXST – Jacob Bonilla 37-yard field goal, 10:55. Bobcats 3–0. Drive: 11 plays, 58 yards, 4:01.
- TXST – Ty Stamey 21-yard pass from Brad Jackson (Jacob Bonilla kick), 4:21. Bobcats 10–0. Drive: 11 plays, 91 yards, 4:36.
- SDSU – Cooper DiLeva 47-yard field goal, 0:19. Bobcats 10–3. Drive: 10 plays, 46 yards, 4:02.

Second quarter

- TXST – Davian Jackson 6-yard pass from Brad Jackson (Jacob Bonilla kick), 9:33. Bobcats 17–3. Drive: 12 plays, 86 yards, 5:44.

Third quarter

- SDSU – Jaylon Hawkins 96-yard kickoff return (Cooper DiLeva kick), 14:49. Bobcats 17–10.
- SDSU – Josiah Lucas 2-yard run (Cooper DiLeva kick), 8:04. Tied 17–17. Drive: 3 plays, 10 yards, 1:10.
- SDSU – Josiah Lucas 7-yard run (Cooper DiLeva kick), 6:45. Aztecs 24–17. Drive: 1 play, 7 yards, 0:04.

Fourth quarter

- TXST – Jacob Bonilla 45-yard field goal, 12:13. Aztecs 24–20. Drive: 12 plays, 53 yards, 4:08.
- TXST – Jayden Denegal sacked in own end zone, 3:02. Aztecs 24–22.
- SDSU – Cameron Cooper 32-yard interception return (Cooper DiLeva kick), 2:47. Aztecs 31–22.
- TXST – Beau Sparks 40-yard pass from Brad Jackson (Jacob Bonilla kick), 1:54. Aztecs 31–29. Drive: 4 plays, 75 yards, 0:53.

Statistics	TXST	SDSU
First downs	34	13
Total yards	565	239
Rushing yards	193	130
Passing yards	372	109
Passing: Comp–Att–Int	27–44–2	15–23–0
Turnovers	2	0
Time of possession	40:33	19:27

Team	Category	Player	Statistics
Texas State	Passing	Brad Jackson	27/43, 372 yards, 3 TD, 2 INT
Texas State	Rushing	Brad Jackson	22 carries, 80 yards
Texas State	Receiving	Beau Sparks	10 receptions, 153 yards, TD
San Diego State	Passing	Jayden Denegal	15/23, 109 yards
San Diego State	Rushing	Josiah Lucas	21 carries, 111 yards, 2 TD
San Diego State	Receiving	Nathan Acevedo	4 receptions, 47 yards

=== Colorado State ===
Colorado State Rams (2–3) at Texas State Bobcats (2–3) – Game summary

Quarter	1	2	3	4	Total
Rams	0	21	6	0	27
Bobcats	21	24	21	0	66

at UFCU Stadium • San Marcos, Texas

- Date: October 15
- Game time: 7:00 p.m. CDT
- Game weather: Sunny
- Game attendance: 16,229
- Referee: Gary Reed
- TV announcers (CBSSN): John Sadak and Randy Cross
- Box score, Recap

Game information
First quarter
- TXST – Torrance Burgess Jr. 2-yard run (Jacob Bonilla kick), 9:53. Bobcats 7–0. Drive: 5 plays, 69 yards, 1:48.
- TXST – Torrance Burgess Jr. 51-yard run (Jacob Bonilla kick), 7:28. Bobcats 14–0. Drive: 2 plays, 60 yards, 0:31.
- TXST – Brad Jackson 4-yard run (Jacob Bonilla kick), 2:51. Bobcats 21–0. Drive: 9 plays, 82 yards, 3:10.

Second quarter

- TXST – Brad Jackson 4-yard run (Jacob Bonilla kick), 11:50. Bobcats 28–0. Drive: 7 plays, 44 yards, 3:05.
- CSU – Durell Robinson 15-yard run (Kali Nguma kick), 8:40. Bobcats 28–7. Drive: 3 plays, 28 yards, 1:20.
- TXST – Ty Stamey 22-yard pass from Brad Jackson (Jacob Bonilla kick), 5:37. Bobcats 35–7. Drive: 7 plays, 75 yards, 3:02.
- CSU – Nader Chirchi 21-yard pass from K'saan Farrar (Kali Nguma kick), 2:50. Bobcats 35–14. Drive: 6 plays, 75 yards, 2:47.
- TXST – Torrance Burgess Jr. 6-yard run (Jacob Bonilla kick), 0:55. Bobcats 42–14. Drive: 10 plays, 79 yards, 1:46.
- CSU – Durell Robinson 1-yard run (Kali Nguma kick), 0:26. Bobcats 42–21. Drive: 4 plays, 75 yards, 0:29.
- TXST – Jacob Bonilla 23-yard field goal, 0:00. Bobcats 45–21. Drive: 5 plays, 60 yards, 0:26.

Third quarter

- CSU – Terrence Smith Jr. 37-yard pass from K'saan Farrar (pass failed), 13:29. Bobcats 45–27. Drive: 4 plays, 75 yards, 1:31.
- TXST – Brad Jackson 3-yard run (Jacob Bonilla kick), 11:30. Bobcats 52–27. Drive: 4 plays, 75 yards, 1:59.
- TXST – Jaylen Jenkins 1-yard run (Jacob Bonilla kick), 5:51. Bobcats 59–27. Drive: 3 plays, 57 yards, 1:33.
- TXST – Torrance Burgess Jr. 19-yard run (Jacob Bonilla kick), 0:22. Bobcats 66–27. Drive: 6 plays, 44 yards, 2:49.

Fourth quarter

- No scoring plays

Statistics	CSU	TXST
First downs	18	31
Total yards	437	716
Rushing yards	148	503
Passing yards	289	213
Passing: Comp–Att–Int	26–41–0	14–19–0
Turnovers	0	1
Time of possession	30:36	29:24

Team	Category	Player	Statistics
Colorado State	Passing	K'saan Farrar	26/41, 289 yards, 2 TD
Colorado State	Rushing	Oliver Lundberg	7 carries, 46 yards
Colorado State	Receiving	Jackson Harper	6 receptions, 98 yards
Texas State	Passing	Brad Jackson	14/19, 213 yards, TD
Texas State	Rushing	Torrance Burgess Jr.	24 carries, 224 yards, 4 TD
Texas State	Receiving	Beau Sparks	2 receptions, 57 yards

=== Utah State ===
Utah State Aggies (2–4) at Texas State Bobcats (3–3) – Game summary

Quarter	1	2	3	4	Total
Aggies	6	3	0	8	17
Bobcats	7	0	7	6	20

at UFCU Stadium • San Marcos, Texas

- Date: October 24
- Game time: 6:30 p.m. CDT
- Game weather: Sunny
- Game attendance: 18,587
- Referee: John Love
- TV announcers (CBSSN): Rich Waltz, Adam Breneman, and Jordan Giorgio
- Box score, Recap

Game information
First quarter
- USU – Kian Afrookhteh 43-yard field goal, 11:12. Aggies 3–0. Drive: 8 plays, 50 yards, 3:48.
- TXST – Jaylen Jenkins 100-yard kickoff return (Jacob Bonilla kick), 10:58. Bobcats 7–3.
- USU – Kian Afrookhteh 48-yard field goal, 5:23. Bobcats 7–6. Drive: 12 plays, 45 yards, 5:35.

Second quarter

- USU – Kian Afrookhteh 27-yard field goal, 11:07. Aggies 9–7. Drive: 10 plays, 41 yards, 5:05.

Third quarter

- TXST – Brad Jackson 3-yard run (Jacob Bonilla kick), 10:10. Bobcats 14–9. Drive: 12 plays, 66 yards, 4:46.

Fourth quarter

- TXST – Jacob Bonilla 51-yard field goal, 13:19. Bobcats 17–9. Drive: 11 plays, 40 yards, 4:32.
- USU – Kaina Watson 6-yard pass from Anthony Garcia (Grady Brosterhous pass to Javen Jacobs), 8:07. Tied 17–17. Drive: 10 plays, 75 yards, 5:12.
- TXST – Jacob Bonilla 37-yard field goal, 1:56. Bobcats 20–17. Drive: 13 plays, 51 yards, 6:04.

Statistics	USU	TXST
First downs	20	20
Total yards	285	250
Rushing yards	73	83
Passing yards	212	167
Passing: Comp–Att–Int	22–37–0	27–37–0
Turnovers	0	0
Time of possession	31:44	28:16

Team	Category	Player	Statistics
Utah State	Passing	Grady Brosterhous	21/36, 206 yards
Utah State	Rushing	Javen Jacobs	14 carries, 42 yards
Utah State	Receiving	Anthony Garcia	8 receptions, 87 yards
Texas State	Passing	Brad Jackson	27/37, 167 yards
Texas State	Rushing	Torrance Burgess Jr.	10 carries, 51 yards
Texas State	Receiving	Chris Dawn Jr.	7 receptions, 48 yards

=== at No. 20т Boise State ===
Texas State Bobcats (4–3) at No. 20т Boise State Broncos (6–1) – Game summary

Quarter	1	2	3	4	Total
Bobcats	0	3	22	20	45
No. 20т Broncos	7	21	0	18	46

at Albertsons Stadium • Boise, Idaho

- Date: October 31
- Game time: 9:00 p.m. CDT / 8:00 p.m. MDT
- Game weather: -
- Game attendance: -
- Referee: -
- TV announcers (CW): Rick Allen, Will Blackmon, and Michael Bumpus

Statistics	TXST	BOIS
First downs		
Total yards		
Rushing yards		
Passing yards		
Passing: Comp–Att–Int		
Turnovers		
Time of possession		

Team	Category	Player	Statistics
Texas State	Passing		
Texas State	Rushing		
Texas State	Receiving		
Boise State	Passing		
Boise State	Rushing		
Boise State	Receiving		

=== at Oregon State ===
Texas State Bobcats (4–4) at Oregon State Beavers (5–3) – Game summary

Quarter	1	2	3	4	Total
Bobcats	14	7	7	14	42
Beavers	7	0	0	14	21

at Reser Stadium • Corvallis, Oregon

- Date: November 7
- Game time: 9:30 p.m. CST / 7:30 p.m. PST
- Game weather: -
- Game attendance: -
- Referee: -
- TV: CW

Statistics	TXST	ORST
First downs		
Total yards		
Rushing yards		
Passing yards		
Passing: Comp–Att–Int		
Turnovers		
Time of possession		

Team	Category	Player	Statistics
Texas State	Passing		
Texas State	Rushing		
Texas State	Receiving		
Oregon State	Passing		
Oregon State	Rushing		
Oregon State	Receiving		

=== Fresno State ===
Fresno State Bulldogs (5–4) at Texas State Bobcats (5–4) – Game summary

Quarter	1	2	3	4	Total
Bulldogs	7	14	7	7	35
Bobcats	21	7	3	6	37

at UFCU Stadium • San Marcos, Texas

- Date: November 14
- Game time: 3:00 p.m. CST
- Game weather: -
- Game attendance: -
- Referee: -
- TV: CW

Statistics	FRES	TXST
First downs		
Total yards		
Rushing yards		
Passing yards		
Passing: Comp–Att–Int		
Turnovers		
Time of possession		

Team	Category	Player	Statistics
Fresno State	Passing		
Fresno State	Rushing		
Fresno State	Receiving		
Texas State	Passing		
Texas State	Rushing		
Texas State	Receiving		

=== Washington State ===
Washington State Cougars (2–8) at Texas State Bobcats (6–4) – Game summary

Quarter	1	2	3	4	Total
Cougars	0	0	0	0	0
Bobcats	0	0	0	0	0

at UFCU Stadium • San Marcos, Texas

- Date: November 21
- Game time: 5:00 p.m. CST
- Game weather: -
- Game attendance: -
- Referee: -
- TV: USA

Statistics	WSU	TXST
First downs		
Total yards		
Rushing yards		
Passing yards		
Passing: Comp–Att–Int		
Turnovers		
Time of possession		

Team	Category	Player	Statistics
Washington State	Passing		
Washington State	Rushing		
Washington State	Receiving		
Texas State	Passing		
Texas State	Rushing		
Texas State	Receiving		

=== at Pac-12 opponent TBA ===
Texas State Bobcats (0–0) at Pac-12 opponent TBA (0–0) – Game summary

Quarter	1	2	Total
Bobcats			0
TBD			0

- Date: November 28
- Game time: TBD

Statistics	TXST	TBA
First downs		
Total yards		
Rushing yards		
Passing yards		
Passing: Comp–Att–Int		
Turnovers		
Time of possession		

Team	Category	Player	Statistics
Texas State	Passing		
Texas State	Rushing		
Texas State	Receiving		
Pac-12 opponent TBA	Passing		
Pac-12 opponent TBA	Rushing		
Pac-12 opponent TBA	Receiving		
