= 2026 Colorado State Rams football team =

American college football season

2026 Colorado State Rams football
- Conference: Pac-12 Conference
- Record: 3–8 (1–6 Pac-12)
- Head coach: Jim L. Mora (1st season)
- Offensive coordinator: Pryce Tracy (1st season)
- Offensive scheme: Spread
- Defensive coordinator: Tyson Summers (3rd season; first 5 games)
- Co-defensive coordinator: Kenny McClendon (1st season)
- Base defense: 3–3–5
- Home stadium: Canvas Stadium

2026 Pac-12 Conference football standings
	Conf.			Overall
Team	W		L	W		L
No. 17 Boise State y	6	–	1	9	–	2
San Diego State y	5	–	2	6	–	5
Texas State	5	–	2	7	–	4
Oregon State	4	–	3	6	–	5
Utah State	3	–	4	4	–	7
Fresno State	3	–	4	6	–	5
Washington State	1	–	6	2	–	9
Colorado State	1	–	6	3	–	8
Championship: San Diego State at Boise State
y – Championship game participant; As of November 22, 2026; Rankings from CFP rankings

The 2026 Colorado State Rams football team represents Colorado State University as a member of the Pac-12 Conference during the 2026 NCAA Division I FBS football season. The Rams are led by first-year head coach Jim L. Mora and play their home games at Canvas Stadium, located in Fort Collins, Colorado.

This is the Rams' first season in the Pac-12.

== Offseason ==
=== Transfers ===
==== Outgoing ====
Player	Position	Destination
Jordan Ross	WR	Arizona
Owen Long	LB	Arizona State
Chris Jackson	CB	Ball State
Jackson Brousseau	QB	California
Landon Bell	WR	CCSF
Ed'Mari Binion	DL	Duquesne
Tanner Morley	WR	Kansas State
Robert Edmonson	LB	Illinois
Christian Martin	OT	Illinois
Jalen Dupree	RB	Kansas
Justin Marshall	RB	Liberty
Caden Branston	DL	McNeese
Aaron Karas	OT	Memphis
Brayden Fowler-Nicolosi	QB	Michigan
Jeremy Naborne	LB	Nevada
Jaxxon Warren	TE	North Carolina
Jackson Murray	DL	Northern Arizona
Payne Williams III	K	Northwestern State
Lloyd Avant	RB	Oklahoma
Rocky Beers	TE	Oklahoma
Konyae Hunter	RB	Prairie View A&M
Javion Kinnard	RB	San Diego State
Dylan Freebury	K	South Alabama
Armani Winfield	WR	South Florida
Chauncey Davis	CB	Stephen F. Austin
John Smith	S	Texas State
Andrew Laurich	DL	UConn
Aitor Urionabarrenechea	OT	UMass
MJ Senegel	OT	UTSA
Bryan Hansen	P	West Virginia
Chance Harrison	S	Western Illinois
Ashton Wolff	K	Western Oregon
Jett Vincent	S	Wyoming
Kory Hall	WR	Unknown
Keynan Higgins	WR	Unknown
Dennious Jackson	DL	Unknown
Jaden Landrum	LB	Unknown
Jordan McIntyre	WR	Unknown
Whitefield Powell	EDGE	Unknown
Drew Rodriguez	LB	Unknown
Clarence Taylor	WR	Unknown
Petey Tucker	WR	Unknown
Dylan Phelps	CB	Withdrawn

==== Incoming ====
Player	Position	Previous school
Elijah Mc-Cantos	CB	Appalachian State
Durell Robinson	RB	Auburn
Pearce Spurlin	TE	Georgia
Khamani Potts	EDGE	Grand Valley State
Grant Houser	TE	Louisville
Payton Stewart	OT	Michigan State
Jordan Mosley	WR	Mississippi State
Caleb Otlewski	EDGE	Montana
Kali Nguma	K	North Texas
Marc Pretto	LB	Northern Illinois
Hauss Hejny	QB	Oklahoma State
Jayden Tuia	OT	Oregon State
Caleb Presley	CB	San Jose State
Richard Mosley III	CB	Stonehill
Quinton Harris	OT	TCU
Mel Brown	RB	UConn
Nykobi Brown	EDGE	UConn
Thai Chiaokhiao-Bowman	WR	UConn
Nader Chirchi	TE	UConn
Cleto Chol	DL	UConn
Oumar Diomande	LB	UConn
Ksaan Farrar	QB	UConn
Malichi Greaves	RB	UConn
Jackson Harper	WR	UConn
Makih Johnson	WR	UConn
Toriyan Johnson	OT	UConn
Brandon Kelley	EDGE	UConn
Oliver Lundberg Coleman	RB	UConn
Diego Rodriguez	OT	UConn
Terrence Smith Jr.	WR	UConn
Dominic Toy	TE	UConn
Javonte Vereen	TE	UConn
Stephon Wright	DL	UConn
Reginald Vick	WR	Wake Forest
TreShawn Moore	S	West Georgia
Robby Harrison	DL	Western Kentucky
Antarron Turner	LB	Wisconsin
Cavan Craig	P	Wofford

== Schedule ==
Date	Time	Opponent	Site	TV	Result	Attendance
September 5	4:00 p.m.	Wyoming*	Canvas Stadium; Fort Collins, CO (Border War)	USA	W 35–13	40,546
September 12	5:00 p.m.	Southern Utah*	Canvas Stadium; Fort Collins, CO	CBSSN	W 58–24	35,749
September 19	5:30 p.m.	No. 11 BYU*	Canvas Stadium; Fort Collins, CO	CBS	L 23–41	38,759
September 26	10:00 a.m.	at UTSA*	Alamodome; San Antonio, TX	ESPNU	L 45–59	17,109
October 3	4:00 p.m.	Oregon State^{†}	Canvas Stadium; Fort Collins, CO	USA	L 26–56	41,000
October 15	6:00 p.m.	at Texas State	UFCU Stadium; San Marcos, TX	CBSSN	L 27–66	16,229
October 24	4:30 p.m.	San Diego State	Canvas Stadium; Fort Collins, CO	The CW	W 56–49	33,720
October 31	1:30 p.m.	at Utah State	Maverik Stadium; Logan, UT	USA	L 14–31	15,835
November 7	4:00 p.m.	No. 25 Boise State	Canvas Stadium; Fort Collins, CO	USA	L 38–64	30,587
November 14	8:30 p.m.	at Washington State	Martin Stadium; Pullman, WA	CBSSN	L 7–73	19,117
November 21	5:30 p.m.	at Fresno State	Valley Children's Stadium; Fresno, CA	The CW	L 42–49	35,213
November 28	3:00 p.m.	Boise State (Note: In the 2026 season, the Pac-12 will use a "flex" scheduling model for Week 13. After the round-robin conference schedule, the conference will determine the pairings for Week 13. "Flex" games will not count in the conference standings.)	Canvas Stadium; Fort Collins, CO	USA		
*Non-conference game; ^{†}Homecoming; Rankings from AP Poll (and CFP Rankings, after November 3) – Released prior to game; All times are in Mountain time

== Game summaries ==
=== Wyoming (Border War) ===
Wyoming Cowboys (0–0) at Colorado State Rams (0–0) – Game summary

Quarter	1	2	3	4	Total
Cowboys	3	3	7	0	13
Rams	7	7	7	14	35

at Canvas Stadium • Fort Collins, Colorado

- Date: September 5
- Game time: 4:00 p.m.
- Game weather: Sunny • Temperature: 89 °F (32 °C) • Wind: NW at 8 miles per hour (13 km/h)
- Game attendance: 40,546
- Referee: Preston Clipper
- TV announcers (USA): Nate Gatter, Ryan Leaf, and Lauren Green

Game information

First quarter

- CSU – Cedric Ross 6-yard pass from Hauss Hejny (Kali Nguma kick), 10:46. Rams 7–0. Drive: 10 plays, 65 yards, 4:14.
- WYO – Erik Sandvik 37-yard field goal, 2:34. Rams 7–3. Drive: 13 plays, 56 yards, 8:12.

Second quarter

- CSU – Reginald Vick Jr. 3-yard pass from Hauss Hejny (Kali Nguma kick), 1:56. Rams 14–3. Drive: 6 plays, 51 yards, 2:36.
- WYO – Erik Sandvik 48-yard field goal, 0:00. Rams 14–6. Drive: 4 plays, 34 yards, 0:33.

Third quarter

- WYO – Tyler Hughes 9-yard run (Erik Sandvik kick), 10:59. Rams 14–13. Drive: 7 plays, 55 yards, 3:55.
- CSU – Reginald Vick Jr. 57-yard pass from Hauss Hejny (Kali Nguma kick), 4:00. Rams 21–13. Drive: 2 plays, 60 yards, 0:40.

Fourth quarter

- CSU – Jackson Harper 24-yard pass from Hauss Hejny (Kali Nguma kick), 11:22. Rams 28–13. Drive: 12 plays, 75 yards, 5:15.
- CSU – Reginald Vick Jr. 4-yard pass from Hauss Hejny (Kali Nguma kick), 1:05. Rams 35–13. Drive: 15 plays, 88 yards, 7:40.

Statistics	WYO	CSU
First downs	17	18
Plays–yards	53–273	67–396
Rushes–yards	34–143	33–154
Passing yards	130	242
Passing: comp–att–int	12–19–3	24–34–0
Turnovers	3	0
Time of possession	30:41	29:19

Team	Category	Player	Statistics
Wyoming	Passing	Tyler Hughes	12/19, 130 yards, 3 INT
Wyoming	Rushing	Samuel Harris	16 carries, 63 yards
Wyoming	Receiving	Jake Wilson	2 receptions, 51 yards
Colorado State	Passing	Hauss Hejny	23/33, 214 yards, 5 TD
Colorado State	Rushing	Mel Brown	8 carries, 57 yards
Colorado State	Receiving	Reginald Vick Jr.	6 receptions, 75 yards, 3 TD

=== Southern Utah (FCS) ===
Southern Utah Thunderbirds (FCS) (1–1) at Colorado State Rams (1–0) – Game summary

Quarter	1	2	3	4	Total
Thunderbirds (FCS)	7	14	0	3	24
Rams	17	31	3	7	58

at Canvas Stadium • Fort Collins, Colorado

- Date: September 12
- Game time: 5:00 p.m.
- Game weather: Cloudy • Temperature: 71 °F (22 °C) • Wind: SE at 7 miles per hour (11 km/h)
- Game attendance: 35,749
- Referee: Dwayne Johnson
- TV announcers (CBSSN): Alex Del Barrio and Emory Hunt

Game information

First quarter

- CSU – Cedric Ross 68-yard pass from Hauss Hejny (Kali Nguma kick), 14:13. Rams 7–0. Drive: 2 plays, 75 yards, 0:47.
- CSU – Terrence Smith Jr. 38-yard pass from Hauss Hejny (Kali Nguma kick), 13:21. Rams 14–0. Drive: 2 plays, 45 yards, 0:44.
- SUU - David Spjut 18-yard pass from Will Burns (Jayden Rogers kick), 9:10. Rams 14-7. Drive: 10 plays, 67 yards, 4:04.
- CSU - Kali Nguma 40-yard field goal, 4:54. Rams 17-7. Drive: 10 plays, 53 yards, 4:16.

Second quarter

- CSU – Mel Brown 1-yard run (Kali Nguma kick), 12:58. Rams 24–7. Drive: 3 plays, 81 yards, 0:23.
- SUU – Floyd Chalk IV 58-yard run (Jayden Rogers kick), 9:57. Rams 24–14. Drive: 3 plays, 71 yards, 0:52.
- SUU - Floyd Chalk IV 3-yard run (Jayden Rogers kick), 4:12. Rams 24-21. Drive: 3 plays, 81 yards, 1:22.
- CSU - Mel Brown 73-yard run (Kali Nguma kick), 3:24. Rams 31-21. Drive: 2 plays, 75 yards, 0:48.
- CSU - Jackson Harper 17-yard pass from Hauss Hejny (Kali Nguma kick), 1:54. Rams 38-21. Drive: 2 plays, 18 yards, 0:21.
- CSU - Terrence Smith Jr. 33-yard pass from Hauss Hejny (Kali Nguma kick), 0:32. Rams 45-21. Drive: 4 plays, 70 yards, 0:42.
- CSU - Kali Nguma 51-yard field goal, 0:03. Rams 48-21. Drive: 4 plays, 8 yards, 0:24.

Third quarter

- CSU – Kali Nguma 23-yard field goal, 5:25. Rams 51–21. Drive: 10 plays, 63 yards, 3:55.

Fourth quarter

- SUU – Jayden Rogers 37-yard field goal, 12:44. Rams 51–24. Drive: 12 plays, 55 yards, 7:37.
- CSU – Hauss Hejny 75-yard run (Kali Nguma kick), 12:31. Rams 58–24. Drive: 1 play, 75 yards, 0:13.

Statistics	SUU	CSU
First downs	18	22
Plays–yards	64–442	69–678
Rushes–yards	39–206	32–296
Passing yards	236	382
Passing: comp–att–int	13–25–2	22–37–1
Turnovers	4	1
Time of possession	33:18	26:42

Team	Category	Player	Statistics
Southern Utah	Passing	Will Burns	12/23, 233 yards, TD, 2 INT
Southern Utah	Rushing	Floyd Chalk IV	17 carries, 144 yards, 2 TD
Southern Utah	Receiving	Mark Bails	4 receptions, 138 yards
Colorado State	Passing	Hauss Hejny	18/20, 325 yards, 4 TD, INT
Colorado State	Rushing	Mel Brown	9 carries, 171 yards, 2 TD
Colorado State	Receiving	Jackson Harper	6 receptions, 102 yards, TD

=== No. 11 BYU ===
No. 11 BYU Cougars (2–0) at Colorado State Rams (2–0) – Game summary

Quarter	1	2	3	4	Total
No. 11 Cougars	21	10	7	3	41
Rams	7	0	0	16	23

at Canvas Stadium • Fort Collins, Colorado

- Date: September 19
- Game time: 5:30 p.m.
- Game weather: Cloudy • Temperature: 70 °F (21 °C) • Wind: NE 7 mph (11 km/h)
- Game attendance: 38,759
- Referee: Kevin Mar
- TV announcers (CBS): Rich Waltz, Adam Breneman, Brian Kelly, and Jordan Giorgio

Game information

First quarter

- BYU – 14:11 LJ Martin 56-yard run (Matthias Dunn kick). BYU 7–0. Drive: 2 plays, 65 yards, 0:49.
- CSU – 11:22 Reginald Vick Jr. 7-yard reception from Hauss Hejny (Kali Nguma kick). TIED 7–7. Drive: 7 plays, 75 yards, 2:49.
- BYU – 9:42 LJ Martin 2-yard run (Matthias Dunn kick). BYU 14–7. Drive: 3 plays, 81 yards, 1:36.
- BYU – 0:51 LJ Martin 8-yard run (Matthias Dunn kick). BYU 21–7. Drive: 6 plays, 73 yards, 3:05.

Second quarter

- BYU – 6:11 Matthias Dunn 44-yard Field Goal. BYU 24–7. Drive: 10 plays, 71 yards, 6:13.
- BYU – 1:18 Legend Glasker 5-yard run (Matthias Dunn kick). BYU 31–7. Drive: 5 plays, 78 yards, 1:38.

Third quarter

- BYU – 9:29 Preston Rex 5-yard run (Matthias Dunn kick). BYU 38–7. Drive: 8 plays, 53 yards, 3:55.

Fourth quarter

- CSU – 12:16 Durrell Robinson 1-yard run (Jackson Harper 2-pt pass from Darius Curry). BYU 38–15. Drive: 6 plays, 45 yards, 3:19.
- BYU – 6:42 Matthias Dunn 26-yard Field Goal. BYU 41–15. Drive: 9 plays, 67 yards, 5:34.
- CSU – 1:58 Nader Chirchi 1-yard reception from Darius Curry (Tommy Maher 2-pt pass from Darius Curry). BYU 41–23. Drive: 11 plays, 75 yards, 4:44.

Statistics	BYU	CSU
First downs	21	17
Plays–yards	58–559	65–302
Rushes–yards	41–332	24–82
Passing yards	227	220
Passing: comp–att–int	12–17–2	25–41–1
Time of possession	33:24	26:36

Team	Category	Player	Statistics
BYU	Passing	Bear Bachmeier	12/16, 227 yards, INT
BYU	Rushing	LJ Martin	15 carries, 176 yards, 3 TD
BYU	Receiving	Legend Glasker	5 receptions, 131 yards
Colorado State	Passing	Hauss Hejny	6/10, 80 yards, TD
Colorado State	Rushing	Durell Robinson	6 carries, 29 yards, TD
Colorado State	Receiving	Cedric Ross	4 receptions, 85 yards

=== at UTSA ===
Colorado State Rams (2–1) at UTSA Roadrunners (2–1) – Game summary

Quarter	1	2	3	4	Total
Rams	14	7	14	10	45
Roadrunners	21	14	7	17	59

at Alamodome • San Antonio, Texas

- Date: September 26
- Game time: 10:00 a.m.
- Game weather: Indoor
- Game attendance: 17,109
- Referee: Charles Lamertina
- TV announcers (ESPNU): Mike Corey and Craig Haubert

Game information

First quarter

- CSU - Mel Brown 94-yard kickoff return (Kali Nguma kick), 14:48. Rams 7-0. Drive: 0 plays, 0 yards, 0:00.
- CSU - Terrence Smith Jr. 74-yard pass from K'saan Farrar (Kali Nguma kick), 13:16. Rams 14-0. Drive: 1 play, 74 yards, 0:09.
- UTSA - Brandon High Jr. 16-yard run (Michael Petro kick), 9:03. Rams 14-7. Drive: 12 plays, 75 yards, 4:13.
- UTSA - Will Henderson III 13-yard run (Michael Petro kick), 5:12. Tied 14-14. Drive: 5 plays, 51 yards, 1:54.
- UTSA - David Amador II 27-yard pass from Owen McCown (Michael Petro kick), 2:04. Roadrunners 21-14. Drive: 4 plays, 57 yards, 1:23.

Second quarter

- UTSA - DJ Allen Jr. 58-yard pass from Owen McCown (Michael Petro kick), 13:29. Roadrunners 28-14. Drive: 5 plays, 80 yards, 1:31.
- UTSA - A'Marion Peterson 5-yard run (Michael Petro kick), 6:48. Roadrunners 35-14. Drive: 10 plays, 59 yards, 4:54.
- CSU - Nader Chirchi 5-yard pass from K'saan Farrar (Kali Nguma kick), 1:55. Roadrunners 35-21. Drive: 11 plays, 75 yards, 4:53.

Third quarter

- CSU - Durell Robinson 1-yard run (Kali Nguma kick), 11:40. Roadrunners 35-28. Drive: 5 plays, 66 yards, 1:39.
- UTSA - Mekhi Anderson 100-yard kickoff return (Michael Petro kick), 11:27. Roadrunners 42-28. Drive: 0 plays, 0 yards, 0:00.
- CSU - Durell Robinson 3-yard run (Kali Nguma kick), 4:06. Roadrunners 42-35. Drive: 15 plays, 75 yards, 7:21.

Fourth quarter

- UTSA - Mekhi Anderson 14-yard pass from Owen McCown (Michael Petro kick), 14:14. Roadrunners 49-35. Drive: 10 plays, 71 yards, 4:45.
- CSU - RJ Vick 18-yard run (Kali Nguma kick), 8;55. Roadrunners 49-42. Drive: 10 plays, 76 yards, 5:13.
- UTSA - Michael Petro 46-yard field goal, 4:56. Roadrunners 52-42. Drive: 10 plays, 47 yards, 3:59.
- CSU - Kali Nguma 51-yard field goal, 2:09. Roadrunners 52-45. Drive: 10 plays, 38 yards, 2:47.
- UTSA - A'Marion Peterson 47-yard run (Michael Petro kick), 2:00. Roadrunners 59-45. Drive: 1 play, 47 yards, 0:08.

Statistics	CSU	UTSA
First downs	21	25
Plays–yards	72–500	78–542
Rushes–yards	32–156	42–239
Passing yards	344	303
Passing: comp–att–int	29–46–1	20–30–0
Time of possession	31:17	28:43

Team	Category	Player	Statistics
Colorado State	Passing	K'saan Farrar	29/46, 344 yards, 2 TD, INT
Colorado State	Rushing	Mel Brown	12 carries, 90 yards
Colorado State	Receiving	Terrence Smith Jr.	6 receptions, 102 yards, TD
UTSA	Passing	Owen McCown	20/20, 303 yards, 3 TD
UTSA	Rushing	Will Henderson III	14 carries, 89 yards, TD
UTSA	Receiving	DJ Allen Jr.	5 receptions, 87 yards, TD

=== Oregon State ===
Oregon State Beavers (2–2) at Colorado State Rams (2–2) – Game summary

Quarter	1	2	3	4	Total
Beavers	14	21	7	14	56
Rams	7	7	6	6	26

at Canvas Stadium • Fort Collins, Colorado

- Date: October 3
- Game time: 4:00 p.m.
- TV announcers (USA): Ted Robinson, Darius Walker, and Dalen Cuff

Statistics	ORST	CSU
First downs		
Plays–yards		
Rushes–yards		
Passing yards		
Passing: comp–att–int		
Time of possession		

Team	Category	Player	Statistics
Oregon State	Passing		
Oregon State	Rushing		
Oregon State	Receiving		
Colorado State	Passing		
Colorado State	Rushing		
Colorado State	Receiving		

=== at Texas State ===
Colorado State Rams (2–3) at Texas State Bobcats (2–3) – Game summary

Quarter	1	2	3	4	Total
Rams	0	21	6	0	27
Bobcats	21	24	21	0	66

at UFCU Stadium • San Marcos, Texas

- Date: October 15
- Game time: 6:00 p.m.
- TV announcers (CBSSN): John Sadak and Randy Cross

Statistics	CSU	TXST
First downs		
Plays–yards		
Rushes–yards		
Passing yards		
Passing: comp–att–int		
Time of possession		

Team	Category	Player	Statistics
Colorado State	Passing		
Colorado State	Rushing		
Colorado State	Receiving		
Texas State	Passing		
Texas State	Rushing		
Texas State	Receiving		

=== San Diego State ===
San Diego State Aztecs (3–4) at Colorado State Rams (2–4) – Game summary

Quarter	1	2	3	4	Total
Aztecs	14	10	10	15	49
Rams	14	21	7	14	56

at Canvas Stadium • Fort Collins, Colorado

- Date: October 24
- Game time: 4:30 p.m.
- TV announcers (The CW): Rick Allen, Will Blackmon, and Michael Bumpus

Statistics	SDSU	CSU
First downs		
Plays–yards		
Rushes–yards		
Passing yards		
Passing: comp–att–int		
Time of possession		

Team	Category	Player	Statistics
San Diego State	Passing		
San Diego State	Rushing		
San Diego State	Receiving		
Colorado State	Passing		
Colorado State	Rushing		
Colorado State	Receiving		

=== at Utah State ===
Colorado State Rams (3–4) at Utah State Aggies (2–5) – Game summary

Quarter	1	2	3	4	Total
Rams	0	0	6	8	14
Aggies	10	7	7	7	31

at Maverik Stadium • Logan, Utah

- Date: October 31
- Game time: 1:30 p.m.
- TV announcers (USA): Ted Robinson, Darius Walker, and Dalen Cuff

Statistics	CSU	USU
First downs		
Plays–yards		
Rushes–yards		
Passing yards		
Passing: comp–att–int		
Time of possession		

Team	Category	Player	Statistics
Colorado State	Passing		
Colorado State	Rushing		
Colorado State	Receiving		
Utah State	Passing		
Utah State	Rushing		
Utah State	Receiving		

=== No. 25 Boise State ===
No. 25 Boise State Broncos (7–1) at Colorado State Rams (3–5) – Game summary

Quarter	1	2	3	4	Total
No. 25 Broncos	22	7	14	21	64
Rams	7	3	14	14	38

at Canvas Stadium • Fort Collins, Colorado

- Date: November 7
- Game time: 4:00 p.m.
- TV announcers (USA): Nate Gatter, Ryan Leaf, and Lauren Green

Statistics	BOIS	CSU
First downs		
Plays–yards		
Rushes–yards		
Passing yards		
Passing: comp–att–int		
Time of possession		

Team	Category	Player	Statistics
Boise State	Passing		
Boise State	Rushing		
Boise State	Receiving		
Colorado State	Passing		
Colorado State	Rushing		
Colorado State	Receiving		

=== at Washington State ===
Colorado State Rams (3–6) at Washington State Cougars (1–8) – Game summary

Quarter	1	2	3	4	Total
Rams	0	7	0	0	7
Cougars	14	24	21	14	73

at Martin Stadium • Pullman, Washington

- Date: November 14
- Game time: 8:30 p.m.
- TV: CBSSN

Statistics	CSU	WSU
First downs		
Plays–yards		
Rushes–yards		
Passing yards		
Passing: comp–att–int		
Time of possession		

Team	Category	Player	Statistics
Colorado State	Passing		
Colorado State	Rushing		
Colorado State	Receiving		
Washington State	Passing		
Washington State	Rushing		
Washington State	Receiving		

=== at Fresno State ===
Colorado State Rams (3–7) at Fresno State Bulldogs (5–5) – Game summary

Quarter	1	2	3	4	Total
Rams	0	0	0	0	0
Bulldogs	0	0	0	0	0

at Valley Children's Stadium • Fresno, California

- Date: November 21
- Game time: 5:30 p.m.
- TV: The CW

Statistics	CSU	FRES
First downs		
Plays–yards		
Rushes–yards		
Passing yards		
Passing: comp–att–int		
Time of possession		

Team	Category	Player	Statistics
Colorado State	Passing		
Colorado State	Rushing		
Colorado State	Receiving		
Fresno State	Passing		
Fresno State	Rushing		
Fresno State	Receiving		

=== Pac-12 Opponent TBA ===
Pac-12 opponent TBA at Colorado State Rams (0–0) – Game summary

Quarter	1	2	3	4	Total
TBA	0	0	0	0	0
Rams	0	0	0	0	0

at Canvas Stadium • Fort Collins, Colorado

- Date: November 28
- Game time: TBD

Statistics	TBA	CSU
First downs		
Plays–yards		
Rushes–yards		
Passing yards		
Passing: comp–att–int		
Time of possession		

Team	Category	Player	Statistics
Pac-12 opponent TBA	Passing		
Pac-12 opponent TBA	Rushing		
Pac-12 opponent TBA	Receiving		
Colorado State	Passing		
Colorado State	Rushing		
Colorado State	Receiving		
