= 2026 Pac-12 Football Championship Game =

- Conference championship
San Diego State Aztecs	Boise State Broncos
Head coach: Sean Lewis	Head coach: Spencer Danielson
- Date: December 4, 2026
- Season: 2026
- Stadium: Albertsons Stadium
- Location: Boise, Idaho

United States TV coverage
- Network: CBS

2026 Pac-12 Conference football standings
	Conf.			Overall
Team	W		L	W		L
No. 17 Boise State y	6	–	1	9	–	2
San Diego State y	5	–	2	6	–	5
Texas State	5	–	2	7	–	4
Oregon State	4	–	3	6	–	5
Utah State	3	–	4	4	–	7
Fresno State	3	–	4	6	–	5
Washington State	1	–	6	2	–	9
Colorado State	1	–	6	3	–	8
Championship: San Diego State at Boise State
y – Championship game participant; As of November 22, 2026; Rankings from CFP rankings

The 2026 Pac-12 Football Championship Game will be a college football game that will be played on December 4, 2026, at Albertsons Stadium in the Boise, Idaho. It will be the 14th edition of the Pac-12 Football Championship Game and will determine the champion of the Pac-12 Conference for the 2026 season. The game will begin at 6:00 p.m. MT and will air on CBS. The game will feature the Boise State Broncos and San Diego State Aztecs.

== Teams ==
=== Boise State Broncos ===
The Broncos clinched a berth in the championship game with a win over Oregon State on November 15. They will make their first appearance in the Pac-12 Championship Game in their inaugural season in the conference. It will be Boise State's ninth conference championship game appearance in the past 10 years, with all of the previous appearances having been in the Mountain West Conference (MW).

=== San Diego State Aztecs ===
The Aztecs clinched their championship game berth on November 21 by winning 22–20 at Boise State; they held the head-to-head tiebreaker against Texas State. SDSU will also play in its first Pac-12 title game in its first season in the conference. This will be the Aztecs' fourth appearance in a conference championship game, having played in the MW championship game three times.
