= Martin Stadium =

Martin Stadium may refer to:

- Martin Stadium at Edens Field, soccer stadium in Clinton, South Carolina
- Martin Stadium (Memphis), former baseball field in Memphis, Tennessee
- Martin Stadium (Northwestern University), sports facility in Evanston, Illinois
- Martin Stadium (Washington), football stadium of Washington State University

== See also ==
- Marion Stadium, outdoor stadium in Marion, Illinois
- Morton Stadium, athletics facility in Dublin, Ireland
