= Michael Bumpus =

American football player (born 1985)

No. 16
- Position: Wide receiver

Personal information
- Born: December 13, 1985 (age 40); Honolulu, Hawaii, U.S.
- Listed height: 5 ft 11 in (1.80 m)
- Listed weight: 194 lb (88 kg)

Career information
- High school: Culver City (Culver City, California)
- College: Washington State (2004–2007)
- NFL draft: 2008: undrafted

Career history
- Seattle Seahawks (2008); BC Lions (2009); Spokane Shock (2010)

Awards and highlights
- Second-team All-Pac-10 (2004)

Career NFL statistics
- Receptions: 5
- Receiving yards: 48
- Receiving TDs: 1
- Stats at Pro Football Reference

Michael Leron Bumpus (born December 13, 1985) is an American former professional football player who was a wide receiver in the National Football League (NFL) and Canadian Football League (CFL). He played college football for the Washington State Cougars and was signed by the NFL 's Seattle Seahawks as an undrafted free agent in 2008.

== Early life ==
Bumpus attended Culver City Middle School. Bumpus played high school football at Culver City High School where he graduated in 2004. While playing for Culver City, he was named to the first-team "Best In The West" by the Long Beach Press Telegram.

== College career ==
Bumpus played his college ball for the Washington State Cougars, where he put up impressive statistics of 195 receptions (a school record), 2,022 yards, and 8 touchdowns. In his freshman year, Bumpus was named to The Sporting News Pac-10 All Freshman Team.

== Professional career ==
Pre-draft measurables
Height	Weight	40-yard dash	10-yard split	20-yard split	20-yard shuttle	Three-cone drill
5 ft 11 5/8 in (1.82 m)	195 lb (88 kg)	4.53 s	1.58 s	2.63 s	4.08 s	6.86 s
All values from Pro Day

=== Seattle Seahawks ===
On September 21, 2008, against the St. Louis Rams, Bumpus scored his lone NFL touchdown on a 10-yard pass from Matt Hasselbeck. He was waived by the team on September 1, 2009, during the first round of cuts.

=== BC Lions ===
On September 16, 2010, Bumpus was added to the BC Lions roster.

=== Spokane Shock ===
Signed on December 10, 2010, to Spokane Shock of the Arena Football League.
