= Jayden Mandal =

American football player (born 2005)

No. 7 – Fresno State Bulldogs
- Position: Quarterback
- Class: Redshirt Junior

Personal information
- Born: April 7, 2005 (age 21); Clovis, California, U.S.
- Listed height: 6 ft 0 in (1.83 m)
- Listed weight: 205 lb (93 kg)

Career information
- High school: Buchanan (Clovis, California)
- College: Fresno State (2023–present)
- Stats at ESPN

Jayden Mandal (born April 7, 2005) is an American college football quarterback for the Fresno State Bulldogs.

== Early life ==
Mandal attended Buchanan High School in Clovis, California and was a three-star recruit. He committed to play college football at California State University, Fresno (Fresno State).

== College career ==
=== 2023 season ===
In his freshman season, Mandal did not play and redshirted.

=== 2024 season ===
In his redshirt freshman season, Mandal appeared in six games and completed 4 passes out of 9 attempts for 39 yards and two interceptions.

=== 2025 season ===
In November 2025, Mandal underwent season-ending surgery and did not appear in the season.

=== 2026 season ===
Ahead of the 2026 season, Mandal entered the season in a quarterback competition with Khristian Martin. On August 31, 2026, Mandal was announced as the starting quarterback for the Bulldogs by head coach Matt Entz.

=== College statistics ===
Season	Team	Games			Passing								Rushing			
Season	Team	GP	GS	Record	Cmp	Att	Pct	Yds	Avg	TD	Int	Rtg	Att	Yds	Avg	TD
2023	Fresno State	0	0	—	Redshirted (redshirt)											
2024	Fresno State	6	1	0–1	4	9	44.4	39	4.3	0	2	36.4	2	-4	-2.0	0
2025	Fresno State	0	0	—	Did not play due to injury											
2026	Fresno State	5	5	4–1	91	137	66.4	1,034	7.5	6	1	142.5	35	109	3.1	1
Career		11	6	4–2	95	146	65.1	1,073	7.3	6	3	136.3	37	105	2.8	1
