= 2025 Arizona Bowl =

Postseason college football bowl game

2025 Snoop Dogg Arizona Bowl presented by Gin & Juice
- 10th Arizona Bowl
Miami RedHawks	Fresno State Bulldogs
(7–6)	(8–4)
MAC	Mountain West
3	18
Head coach: Chuck Martin	Head coach: Matt Entz
	1	2	3	4	Total
Miami	3	0	0	0	3
Fresno State	0	9	0	9	18
- Date: December 27, 2025
- Season: 2025
- Stadium: Casino Del Sol Stadium
- Location: Tucson, Arizona
- MVP: E. J. Warner (QB, Fresno State)
- Favorite: Fresno State by 5.5
- Referee: Rodney Burnette (CUSA)
- Attendance: 37,232

United States TV coverage
- Network: The CW
- Announcers: Thom Brennaman (play-by-play), Will Blackmon (analyst), and Wes Bryant (sideline)

The 2025 Arizona Bowl was a college football bowl game played on December 27, 2025, at Casino Del Sol Stadium in Tucson, Arizona. The 10th annual Arizona Bowl began at approximately 2:30 p.m. MST and aired on The CW. The Arizona Bowl was one of the 2025–26 bowl games concluding the 2025 FBS football season. Sponsored by Snoop Dogg's drink brand, Gin & Juice by Dre and Snoop, the bowl was officially named the Snoop Dogg Arizona Bowl presented by Gin & Juice by Dre and Snoop

Fresno State of the Mountain West Conference defeated Miami (OH) of the Mid-American Conference (MAC) by an 18–3 score.

== Teams ==
Consistent with conference tie-ins, the game featured the Miami RedHawks from the Mid-American Conference (MAC) and the Fresno State Bulldogs of the Mountain West Conference. This was the first meeting between the two teams.

=== Miami RedHawks ===
Miami began their season with three consecutive losses, then won their next five games. They won two of their four November games, and qualified for the MAC Football Championship Game on December 6. In a rematch with Western Michigan, whom they had defeated on October 25, the RedHawks suffered a 23–13 defeat. Miami entered the Arizona Bowl with a 7–6 record.

=== Fresno State Bulldogs ===
Fresno State suffered a loss to Kansas in their first game, then won five games in a row. Back-to-back losses gave them a 5–3 record at the end of October. The Bulldogs won three of the four games they played in November and entered the Arizona Bowl with an 8–4 record.

== Game summary ==
2025 Snoop Dogg Arizona Bowl presented by Gin & Juice

Quarter	1	2	3	4	Total
Miami (OH)	3	0	0	0	3
Fresno State	0	9	0	9	18

at Casino Del Sol Stadium • Tucson, Arizona

- Date: December 27, 2025
- Game time: 2:30 p.m. MST
- Game weather: Cloudy • Temperature: 65 °F (18 °C)
- Game attendance: 37,232
- Referee: Rodney Burnette
- TV announcers (The CW): Thom Brennaman (play-by-play), Will Blackmon (analyst), and Wes Bryant (sideline)
- Box score

=== Statistics ===
Statistics	M-OH	FRES
First downs	12	18
Plays–yards	48–192	71–396
Rushes–yards	26–120	49–177
Passing yards	72	219
Passing: comp–att–int	6–22–1	15–22–0
Turnovers		
Time of possession	21:20	38:40

Team	Category	Player	Statistics
Miami (OH)	Passing	Thomas Gotkowski	6/22, 72 yards, 1 INT
Miami (OH)	Rushing	Keith Reynolds	3 carries, 46 yards
Miami (OH)	Receiving	Cole Weaver	2 receptions, 43 yards
Fresno State	Passing	E. J. Warner	15/22, 219 yards, 1 TD
Fresno State	Rushing	Brandon Ramirez	11 carries, 53 yards
Fresno State	Receiving	Josiah Freeman	7 receptions 143 yards
