= 2026 Fresno State Bulldogs football team =

American college football season

2026 Fresno State Bulldogs football
- Conference: Pac-12 Conference
- Record: 6–5 (3–4 Pac-12)
- Head coach: Matt Entz (2nd season)
- Offensive coordinator: Josh Davis (2nd season)
- Offensive scheme: Pistol
- Defensive coordinator: Nick Benedetto (2nd season)
- Co-defensive coordinator: Adam Breske (1st season)
- Base defense: 4–2–5
- Home stadium: Valley Children's Stadium

2026 Pac-12 Conference football standings
	Conf.			Overall
Team	W		L	W		L
No. 17 Boise State y	6	–	1	9	–	2
San Diego State y	5	–	2	6	–	5
Texas State	5	–	2	7	–	4
Oregon State	4	–	3	6	–	5
Utah State	3	–	4	4	–	7
Fresno State	3	–	4	6	–	5
Washington State	1	–	6	2	–	9
Colorado State	1	–	6	3	–	8
Championship: San Diego State at Boise State
y – Championship game participant; As of November 22, 2026; Rankings from CFP rankings

The 2026 Fresno State Bulldogs football team represents California State University, Fresno as a member of the Pac-12 Conference during the 2026 NCAA Division I FBS football season. The Bulldogs are led by second-year head coach Matt Entz and play their home games at Valley Children's Stadium, located in Fresno, California.

This is the Bulldogs' first season in the Pac-12.

== Offseason ==
=== Transfers ===
==== Outgoing ====
Player	Position	Destination
RL Miller	LB	Cal Poly
Brayden Turner	QB	College of San Mateo
Isiah Chala	DL	Sacramento State
Carson Conklin	QB	Sacramento State
Tim Thomas	LB	Sacramento State
Jack Metzler	EDGE	San Diego Mesa
Damarrion White	EDGE	Southwestern (CA)
Richie Anderson	TE	Texas A&M
Jayden Davis	CB	UConn
Ah'marion Ashley	CB	UT Permian Basin
Josiah Ayon	WR	Unknown

==== Incoming ====
Player	Position	Previous school
Manaki Watanabe	K	Ashland
Tariq Thomas	RB	Bucknell
Khristian Martin	QB	Maryland
Maverick Noonan	EDGE	Nebraska
Preston Okafor	CB	Nebraska
Jake Appleget	TE	Northern Illinois
Taylor Powell	S	Northern Illinois
Darrian Anderson	WR	Oregon
Dylan Hampsten	EDGE	Sacramento State
Micah Mosley	EDGE	Sacramento State
Oscar Weigel	IOL	San Diego
Patrick Barnett	OT	UCF
Croix Stewart	S	UCLA

=== Coaching staff additions ===
Name	New Position	Previous Team	Previous Position	Source

== Schedule ==
Date	Time	Opponent	Site	TV	Result	Attendance
September 4	6:00 p.m.	at No. 14т USC*	Los Angeles Memorial Coliseum; Los Angeles, CA	FOX	L 0–39	53,014
September 12	7:30 p.m.	Sacramento State*	Valley Children's Stadium; Fresno, CA	CBSSN	W 49–3	40,198
September 19	8:00 p.m.	at San Jose State*	CEFCU Stadium; San Jose, CA (Battle for the Valley)	FS1	W 26–10	18,256
September 26	7:00 p.m.	Rice*	Valley Children's Stadium; Fresno, CA	The CW	W 38–24	39,001
October 3	6:30 p.m.	at Washington State	Martin Stadium; Pullman, WA	USA	W 26–6	26,471
October 10	7:30 p.m.	No. 23 Boise State	Valley Children's Stadium; Fresno, CA (rivalry)	The CW	L 31–38	43,086
October 17	7:30 p.m.	at San Diego State	Snapdragon Stadium; San Diego, CA (rivalry)	CBSSN	L 23–26	21,847
October 31	8:00 p.m.	Oregon State	Valley Children's Stadium; Fresno, CA	USA	W 38–22	32,501
November 7	6:30 p.m.	at Utah State	Maverik Stadium; Logan, UT	USA	L 10–17	17,082
November 14	1:00 p.m.	at Texas State	UFCU Stadium; San Marcos, TX	The CW	L 35–37	15,226
November 21	4:30 p.m.	Colorado State	Valley Children's Stadium; Fresno, CA	The CW	W 49–42	35,213
November 28	7:00 p.m.	Oregon State (Note: In the 2026 season, the Pac-12 will use a "flex" scheduling model for Week 13. After the round-robin conference schedule, the conference will determine the pairings for Week 13. "Flex" games will not count in the conference standings.)	Valley Children's Stadium; Fresno, CA	The CW		
*Non-conference game; Rankings from AP Poll (and CFP Rankings, after November 3) – Released prior to game; All times are in Mountain time

== Roster ==
2026 Fresno State Bulldogs football team roster
Players
Coaches
Offense

Pos.	#	Name	Class
WR	0	Ezekiel Avit	Jr
WR	1	Jahlil McClain	Jr
RB	2	Rayshon Luke	Sr
QB	3	Khristian Martin	So
WR	5	Josiah Freeman	Sr
RB	6	Bryson Donelson	Jr
QB	7	Jayden Mandal	Jr
WR	10	Jordan Malau'ulu	So
WR	11	Jayon Farrar	Sr
QB	13	Jacob Chambers	Fr
QB	16	Jonathan Craft	Fr
QB	17	Deagan Rose	Fr
WR	18	Isaiah Dillon	Fr
WR	19	Harold Duvall	So
RB	20	Orlando Guevara	Jr
RB	24	Julius Gillick	Fr
WR	25	Keynan Cotton	Fr
WR	26	Maxwell Young	Fr
RB	27	Tariq Thomas	Jr
RB	28	Jhadis Luckey	Fr
WR	29	Malakai Sumter	Fr
TE	30	Jace Nixon	So
RB	31	Brandon Ramirez	Jr
TE	32	Ryan Lewis	Fr
RB	33	Maddox Merrill	Fr
RB	34	Jalen Harris	Fr
TE	35	Sebastien Boydell	Fr
TE	36	Zane Gerbo	Fr
TE	37	Sylas Austin	Fr
WR	39	Tyler Becker	Jr
RB	41	Andrew Chavez	Jr
TE	42	Brayden Ford	Fr
TE	44	Robert Lucero	Fr
OL	50	Pat Barnett	Sr
OL	51	Braylan Henderson	Sr
OL	55	Marquise Thorpe-Taylor	So
OL	56	Ben Baker	So
OL	58	Efren Siuloa	Fr
OL	59	Alex Rivera	Fr
OL	63	Malcolm Polu Jr.	Fr
OL	65	Jonah Leaupepetele	Fr
OL	66	Gino Quinones	Sr
OL	67	Bode Stoddard	So
OL	68	Ekene Ebizie	Fr
OL	69	Oscar Weigel	So
OL	71	Rolan Fullwood	Sr
OL	72	Edward Fonua	Sr
OL	73	Marsel Akins	So
OL	75	Kyson Van Vugt	Sr
OL	76	Brayden Walton	So
OL	79	Ethan Dasmann	So
WR	80	Jaylen Garrison	Sr
WR	81	Xavier Owens	Fr
WR	82	Darrian Anderson	Sr
TE	85	Bryce McDaniel	Fr
TE	86	Gavin Correia	So
TE	87	Jake Appleget	Sr
TE	88	Dallas Gaius-Anyaegbu	Fr
TE	89	Brock Lium	Jr

Defense

Pos.	#	Name	Class
DL	0	Deijon Laffitte	Jr
LB	1	K'vion Thunderbird	Jr
CB	2	Andre Cobb	Sr
DB	3	Jaden Carrillo	Jr
DB	4	Ethan Tierney	Jr
CB	5	Simeon Harris	Sr
DL	6	Jahzon Jacks	Sr
DB	7	Loyall Mouzon	So
DL	8	Martin Owusu	Jr
DL	9	Merhauti Xepera	Sr
DL	11	Dylan Hampsten	Jr
CB	13	Cam Cole	So
DB	17	Jonavon Harrington	Fr
LB	18	Logan Studt	So
DB	19	Preston Okafor	So
DB	20	R. J. Regan	GS
DB	23	Sammie Hunter	So
DB	24	Croix Stewart	Sr
LB	25	Justin Johnson	Jr
DB	26	Truly Bell III	Fr
DB	27	Gerayas Grimes	So
DB	28	Jomarion Briggs	Sr
DB	29	Franklin Lockard	Fr
DB	30	Luke Sanchez	Fr
DB	31	Kiontre Harris	So
CB	32	Tyger Canales	Fr
DB	33	Taylor Powell	So
DB	34	DaJhon Hall	Fr
LB	35	Tytus Khajavi	So
LB	36	Tommy Nix	So
DB	37	Ryan Wilson	Sr
CB	38	Isaiah Lucero	Fr
DB	39	Chase Perino	Fr
LB	40	Jaydon Sutko	Fr
LB	42	Lucas Blumling	Fr
LB	43	Niko Baumgartner	Fr
LB	44	Bo Ausmus	Fr
LB	45	Zephaniah Sesay	Fr
DL	54	Sione Noa	GS
DL	55	Brendan Huddleston	Fr
DL	56	Jairus Satele	Sr
DL	85	Solomon Baker	Fr
DL	89	Mordecai Hines	Jr
DL	91	Auckland Asiata	Jr
DL	92	Luke Averell	So
DL	93	Bryson Harrington	So
DL	94	Micah Mosley	So
DL	95	Maverick Noonan	Jr
DL	96	Noah Yeh	Jr
DL	97	Jake Plummer-First	Fr
DL	98	Steven Scott III	So
DL	99	Logan Goodspeed	So

Special teams

Pos.	#	Name	Class
K	38	Manaki Watanabe	So
K	40	Ryan Kobzeff	Fr
P	41	Nick Verdugo	Sr
K	45	Connor Tripp	So
P	49	Clay Lawrence	Jr
LS	52	Ethan Rossetti	Jr
LS	53	Jack Baldi	Fr

Head coach

- Matt Entz

Coordinators/assistant coaches

- John Baxter – Assistant head coach/special teams coordinator
- Nick Benedetto – Defensive coordinator/associate head coach
- Josh Davis – Offensive coordinator
- Adam Breske – Co-defensive coordinator/linebackers
- Brian Ferentz – Offensive linemen
- Jordan Gigli – Run game coordinator/defensive linemen
- Marcus Hall-Oliver – Edge rushers
- DelVon Hardaway – Wide receivers
- Bijan Hosseini – Tight ends
- Tucker Meyer – Nickelbacks
- Aaron Prier – Running backs
- Jared Taylor – Quarterbacks
- J. D. Williams – Cornerbacks
- Spencer Petras – Assistant offensive linemen
- Johnathan Winfield – Offensive analyst
- Justin Bailey – Defensive analyst
- Tyrone Terrell – Defensive analyst

Legend

- (C) Team captain
- (S) Suspended
- (I) Ineligible
- Injured
- Redshirt

Roster
Last update: 9/3/26

== Game summaries ==
=== at No. 14т USC ===
Fresno State Bulldogs (0–0) at No. 14т USC Trojans (0–0) – Game summary

Quarter	1	2	3	4	Total
Bulldogs	0	0	0	0	0
No. 14т Trojans	7	23	2	7	39

at Los Angeles Memorial Coliseum • Los Angeles, California

- Date: September 4
- Game time: 6:00 pm
- Game weather: Sunny • Temperature: 77 °F (25 °C) • Wind: SW at 7 miles per hour (11 km/h)
- Game attendance: 53,014
- Referee: Jason Gant
- TV announcers (FOX): Connor Onion (play-by-play), Robert Griffin III (analyst), and Alexa Landestoy (sideline)

Game information

First quarter

- (9:27) USC - Tanook Hines 8-yard pass from Jayden Maiava (Caden Chittenden kick), (Drive: 12 plays, 82 yards, 5:33; USC 7-0)

Second quarter

- (12:27) USC - Trent Mosley 68-yard pass from Jayden Maiava (Caden Chitenden kick), (Drive: 4 plays, 83 yards, 1:45; USC 14-0)
- (7:09) USC - Jayden Mandal 1-yard sack by Kennedy Urlacher for a Safety (Drive: 3 plays, -13 yards, 1:03; USC 16-0)
- (4:07) USC - Trent Mosley 9-yard pass from Jayden Maiava (Caden Chitenden kick), (Drive: 5 plays, 65 yards, 2:56; USC 23-0)
- (0:11) USC - Waymond Jordan 2-yard run (Caden Chitenden kick), (Drive: 5 plays, 38 yards, 2:10; USC 30-0)

Third quarter

- (5:15) USC - Jayden Mandal 7-yard sack by Alex Graham (Drive: 1 play, -7 yards, 0:05; USC 32-0)

Fourth quarter

- (5:46) USC - Deshonne Redeaux 5-yard run (Caden Chitenden kick), (Drive: 10 plays, 79 yards, 6:47; USC 39-0)

Statistics	FRES	USC
First downs	9	27
Plays–yards	44–116	68–552
Rushes–yards	29–39	37–140
Passing yards	77	412
Passing: comp–att–int	7–15–1	29–31–0
Turnovers	2	2
Time of possession	21:08	38:52

Team	Category	Player	Statistics
Fresno State	Passing	Jayden Mandal	7/15, 77 yards, INT
Fresno State	Rushing	Rayshon Luke	8 carries, 21 yards
Fresno State	Receiving	Harold Duball	2 receptions, 34 yards
USC	Passing	Jayden Maiava	23/25, 349 yards, 3 TD
USC	Rushing	Waymond Jordan	11 carries, 67 yards, TD
USC	Receiving	Trent Mosley	4 receptions, 104 yards, 2 TD

=== Sacramento State ===
Sacramento State Hornets (1–1) at Fresno State Bulldogs (0–1) – Game summary

Quarter	1	2	3	4	Total
Hornets	0	0	3	0	3
Bulldogs	0	32	14	3	49

at Valley Children's Stadium • Fresno, California

- Date: September 12
- Game time: 7:30 p.m.
- Game weather: Clear • Temperature: 90 °F (32 °C) • Wind: NW at 11 miles per hour (18 km/h)
- Game attendance: 40,198
- Referee: Chris Wiggins
- TV announcers (CBSSN): Chris Lewis and Randy Cross

Game information

First quarter

- No scoring plays.

Second quarter

- (14:53) FRES - Rayshon Luke 18-yard pass from Jayden Mandal (Manaki Watanabe kick), (Drive: 5 plays, 54 yards, 1:54; Fresno State 7-0)
- (11:58) FRES - Ezekiel Avit 73-yard pass from Jayden Mandal (Jayden Mandal pass to Gavin Correia for two-point conversion), (Drive: 1 play, 73 yards, 0:11; Fresno State 15-0)
- (6:19) FRES - Jayden Mandal 1-yard run (Manaki Watanabe kick), (Drive: 8 plays, 58 yards, 4:16; Fresno State 22-0)
- (1:28) FRES - Bryson Donelson 11-yard run (Manaki Watanabe kick), (Drive: 8 plays, 63 yards, 3:47; Fresno State 29-0)
- (0:00) FRES - Manaki Watanabe 51-yard field goal, (Drive: 6 plays, 25 yards, 0:28; Fresno State 32-0)

Third quarter

- (9:02) FRES - Bryson Donelson 5-yard run (Manaki Watanabe kick), (Drive: 6 plays, 55 yards, 2:55; Fresno State 39-0)
- (4:50) SAC - Grant Meadors 35-yard field goal, (Drive: 9 plays, 58 yards, 4:12; Fresno State 39-3)
- (2:43) FRES - Bryson Donelson 56-yard run (Manaki Watanabe kick), (Drive: 4 plays, 75 yards, 2:07; Fresno State 46-3)

Fourth quarter

- (7:09) FRES - Manake Watanabe 28-yard field goal, (Drive: 10 plays, 69 yards, 5:53; Fresno State 49-3)

Statistics	SAC	FRES
First downs	16	26
Plays–yards	65–262	63–542
Rushes–yards	34–112	33–193
Passing yards	150	349
Passing: comp–att–int	15–31–1	26–30–0
Turnovers	1	0
Time of possession	28:47	31:13

Team	Category	Player	Statistics
Sacramento State	Passing	Jackson Sharman	15/31, 150 yards, INT
Sacramento State	Rushing	Jamar Curtis	9 carries, 48 yards
Sacramento State	Receiving	Onterrio Smith Jr.	4 receptions, 66 yards
Fresno State	Passing	Jayden Mandal	23/26, 316 yards, 2 TD
Fresno State	Rushing	Bryson Donelson	13 carries, 102 yards, 3 TD
Fresno State	Receiving	Ezekiel Avit	2 receptions, 103 yards, TD

=== at San Jose State (Battle for the Valley) ===
Fresno State Bulldogs (1–1) at San Jose State Spartans (2–1) – Game summary

Quarter	1	2	3	4	Total
Bulldogs	0	6	7	13	26
Spartans	3	0	0	7	10

at CEFCU Stadium • San Jose, California

- Date: September 19
- Game time: 8:00 p.m.
- Game weather: Clear • Temperature: 65 °F (18 °C) • Wind: NW 10 mph
- Game attendance: 18,256
- Referee: Brad Carrell
- TV announcers (FS1): Carlo Jiménez and Petros Papadakis

Game information

First quarter

- (9:25) SJSU - Trajan Sinatra 45-yard field goal, (Drive: 8 plays, 40 yards, 3:33; San Jose State 3-0)

Second quarter

- (11:44) FRES - Manaki Watanabe 52-yard field goal, (Drive: 5 plays, 17 yards, 1:20; Tied 3-3)
- (0:50) FRES - Manaki Watanabe 51-yard field goal, (Drive: 5 plays, 32 yards, 0:46; Fresno State 6-3)

Third quarter

- (12:00) FRES - Josiah Freeman 18-yard pass from Jayden Mandal (Manaki Watanabe kick), (Drive: 2 plays, 14 yards, 1:03; Fresno State 13-3)

Fourth quarter

- (12:40) SJSU - Carson Clark 1-yard pass from Luke Weaver (Trajan Sinatra kick), (Drive: 15 plays, 92 yards, 6:11; Fresno State 13-10)
- (6:38) FRES - Manaki Watanabe 44-yard field goal, (Drive: 11 plays, 60 yards, 5:52; Fresno State 16-10)
- (1:57) FRES - Manaki Watanabe 40-yard field goal, (Drive: 4 plays, 4 yards, 1:34; Fresno State 19-10)
- (1:17) FRES - Bryson Donelson 36-yard run (Manaki Watanabe kick), (Drive: 2 plays, 39 yards, 0:13; Fresno State 26-10)

Statistics	FRES	SJSU
First downs	16	13
Plays–yards	68–354	70–335
Rushes–yards	39–168	32–191
Passing yards	186	244
Passing: comp–att–int	15–19–0	21–38–4
Time of possession	33:52	26:08

Team	Category	Player	Statistics
Fresno State	Passing	Jayden Mandal	15/29, 186 yards, TD
Fresno State	Rushing	Bryson Donelson	9 carries, 60 yards, TD
Fresno State	Receiving	Josiah Freeman	6 receptions, 95 yards, TD
San Jose State	Passing	Luke Weaver	21/38, 244 yards, TD, 4 INT
San Jose State	Rushing	Jabari Bates	19 carries, 94 yards
San Jose State	Receiving	Anthony Ivey	7 receptions, 150 yards

=== Rice ===
Rice Owls (1–2) at Fresno State Bulldogs (2–1) – Game summary

Quarter	1	2	3	4	Total
Owls	7	10	0	7	24
Bulldogs	0	14	10	14	38

at Valley Children's Stadium • Fresno, California

- Date: September 26
- Game time: 7:00 p.m.
- Game weather: Clear • Temperature: 86 °F (30 °C) • Wind: SE at 5 miles per hour (8.0 km/h)
- Game attendance: 39,001
- Referee: Reid Jackson
- TV announcers (The CW): Rick Allen, Will Blackmon and Nigel Burton

Game information

First quarter

- (5:38) RICE - Ben Grice 88-yard run (Enock Gota kick), (Drive: 1 play, 88 yards, 0:06; Rice 7-0)

Second quarter

- (12:51) FRES - Josiah Freeman 6-yard pass from Jayden Mandal (Manaki Watanabe kick), (Drive: 8 plays, 69 yards, 4:38; Tied 7-7)
- (8:34) RICE - Max Mosey 40-yard pass from Jacurri Brown (Enock Gota kick), (Drive: 8 plays, 75 yards, 4:16; Rice 14-7)
- (1:04) FRES - Jahlil McClain 28-yard pass from Jayden Mandal (Manaki Watanabe kick), (Drive: 6 plays, 64 yards, 0:46; Tied 14-14)
- (0:01) RICE - Enock Gota 22-yard field goal, (Drive: 9 plays, 66 yards, 1:04; Rice 17-14)

Third quarter

- (9:47) FRES - Manaki Watanabe 29-yard field goal, (Drive: 12 plays, 42 yards, 5:13; Tied 17-17)
- (4:44) FRES - Ezekiel Avit 7-yard pass from Jayden Mandal (Manaki Watanabe kick), (Drive: 5 plays, 19 yards, 2:23; Fresno State 24-17)

Fourth quarter

- (13:00) FRES - Julius Gillick 5-yard run (Manaki Watanabe kick), (Drive: 9 plays, 65 yards, 5:09; Fresno State 31-17)
- (8:58) RICE - Jacurri Brown 50-yard run (Enock Gota kick), (Drive: 9 plays, 78 yards, 3:56; Fresno State 31-24)
- (7:37) FRES - Rayshon Luke 52-yard run (Manaki Watanabe kick), (Drive: 3 plays, 75 yards, 1:21; Fresno State 38-24)

Statistics	RICE	FRES
First downs	22	23
Plays–yards	63–463	68–459
Rushes–yards	46–344	34–249
Passing yards	119	210
Passing: comp–att–int	8–17–1	22–34–0
Time of possession	27:22	32:38

Team	Category	Player	Statistics
Rice	Passing	Jacurri Brown	8/17, 119 yards, TD, INT
Rice	Rushing	Jacurri Brown	19 carries, 141 yards, TD
Rice	Receiving	Max Mosey	1 reception, 40 yards, TD
Fresno State	Passing	Jayden Mandal	22/34, 210 yards, 3 TD
Fresno State	Rushing	Rayshon Luke	11 carries, 167 yards, TD
Fresno State	Receiving	Josiah Freeman	6 receptions, 66 yards, TD

=== at Washington State ===
Fresno State Bulldogs (3–1) at Washington State Cougars (1–3) – Game summary

Quarter	1	2	3	4	Total
Bulldogs	3	3	7	13	26
Cougars	0	6	0	0	6

at Martin Stadium • Pullman, Washington

- Date: October 3
- Game time: 6:30 p.m.
- Game weather: Sunny • Temperature: 70 °F (21 °C) • Wind: W 3 mph
- Game attendance: 26,471
- Referee: Chris Snead
- TV announcers (USA): Nate Gatter, Ryan Leaf, and Lauren Green

Game information

First quarter

- (7:01) FRES - Manaki Watanabe 27-yard field goal, (Drive: 11 plays, 72 yards, 5:36; Fresno State 3-0)

Second quarter

- (9:27) WSU - Jack Stevens 32-yard field goal, (Drive: 7 plays, 36 yards, 3:07; Tied 3-3)
- (6:06) FRES - Manaki Watanabe 22-yard field goal, (Drive: 9 plays, 71 yards, 3:21; Fresno State 6-3)
- (0:03) WSU - Jack Stevens 50-yard field goal, (Drive: 10 plays, 56 yards, 1:46; Tied 6-6)

Third quarter

- (9:41) FRES - Josiah Freeman 3-yard run (Manaki Watanabe kick), (Drive: 6 plays, 56 yards, 3:12; Fresno State 13-6)

Fourth quarter

- (11:00) FRES - Manaki Watanabe 31-yard field goal, (Drive: 5 plays, 45 yards, 2:31; Fresno State 16-6)
- (3:54) FRES - Julius Gillick 8-yard run (Manaki Watanabe kick), (Drive: 1 play, 8 yards, 0:06; Fresno State 23-6)
- (3:15) FRES - Manaki Watanabe 33-yard field goal, (Drive: 4 plays, 3 yards, 0:29; Fresno State 26-6)

Statistics	FRES	WSU
First downs	15	9
Plays–yards	68–375	58–182
Rushes–yards	35–130	24–130
Passing yards	245	152
Passing: comp–att–int	24–33–0	21–34–1
Time of possession	35:59	24:01

Team	Category	Player	Statistics
Fresno State	Passing	Jayden Mandal	24/33, 245 yards
Fresno State	Rushing	Rayshon Luke	6 carries, 50 yards
Fresno State	Receiving	Josiah Freeman	7 receptions, 61 yards
Washington State	Passing	Caden Pinnick	21/34, 152 yards, INT
Washington State	Rushing	Kirby Vorhees	6 carries, 25 yards
Washington State	Receiving	Darrius Clemons	3 receptions, 33 yards

=== No. 23 Boise State (rivalry) ===
No. 23 Boise State Broncos (4–1) at Fresno State Bulldogs (4–1) – Game summary

Quarter	1	2	3	4	Total
No. 23 Broncos	15	10	3	10	38
Bulldogs	13	7	0	11	31

at Valley Children's Stadium • Fresno, California

- Date: October 10
- Game time: 7:30 p.m.
- Game weather: Clear • Temperature: 77 °F (25 °C) • Wind: NW at 5 miles per hour (8.0 km/h)
- Game attendance: 43,086
- Referee: John Love
- TV announcers (The CW): Rick Allen, Will Blackmon, and Michael Bumpus

Game information

First quarter

- (10:58) FRES - Jayden Mandal 8-yard run (Manaki Watanabe kick), (Drive: 10 plays, 75 yards, 4:02; Fresno State 7-0)
- (10:10) BOIS - Dylan Riley 72-yard run (Zeke Martinez run), (Drive: 2 plays, 75 yards, 0:48; Boise State 8-7)
- (1:12) BOIS - Terrious Favors 72-yard pass from Maddux Madsen (Cannon Moore kick), (Drive: 13 plays, 90 yards, 7:19; Boise State 15-7)
- (0:45) FRES - Ezekiel Avit 59-yard pass from Khristian Martin (pass failed), (Drive: 2 plays, 74 yards, 0:21; Boise State 15-13)

Second quarter

- (7:42) BOIS - Sire Gaines 2-yard run (Cannon Moore kick), (Drive: 18 plays, 75 yards, 8:03; Boise State 22-13)
- (0:56) FRES - Ezekiel Avit 10-yard pass from Jayden Mandal (Manaki Watanabe kick), (Drive: 9 plays, 59 yards, 2:36; Boise State 22-20)
- (0:02) BOIS - Cannon Moore 49-yard field goal, (Drive: 7 plays, 32 yards, 0:48; Boise State 25-20)

Third quarter

- (7:08) BOIS - Cannon Moore 38-yard field goal, (Drive: 14 plays, 66 yards, 7:52; Boise State 28-20)

Fourth quarter

- (14:52) BOIS - Dylan Riley 44-yard pass from Maddux Madsen (Cannon Moore kick), (Drive: 8 plays, 88 yards, 4:10; Boise State 35-20)
- (10:41) FRES - Gavin Correia 15-yard pass from Jayden Mandal (Jahlil McClain-Jayden Mandal pass), (Drive: 11 plays, 73 yards, 5:29; Boise State 35-28)
- (1:34) BOIS - Cannon Moore 39-yard field goal, (Drive: 14 plays, 61 yards, 7:40; Boise State 38-28)
- (0:36) FRES - Manaki Watanabe 47-yard field goal, (Drive: 6 plays, 46 yards, 0:58; Boise State 38-31)

Statistics	BOIS	FRES
First downs	29	21
Plays–yards	79–512	52–346
Rushes–yards	45–274	16–69
Passing yards	238	277
Passing: comp–att–int	23–34–0	20–35–0
Time of possession	38:56	21:04

Team	Category	Player	Statistics
Boise State	Passing	Maddux Madsen	23/34, 238 yards, 2 TD
Boise State	Rushing	Dylan Riley	19 carries, 150 yards, TD
Boise State	Receiving	Dylan Riley	4 receptions, 64 yards, TD
Fresno State	Passing	Jayden Mandal	20/35, 218 yards, 2 TD
Fresno State	Rushing	Bryson Donelson	4 carries, 31 yards
Fresno State	Receiving	Ezekiel Avit	6 receptions, 96 yards, 2 TD

=== at San Diego State (rivalry) ===
Fresno State Bulldogs (4–2) at San Diego State Aztecs (2–4) – Game summary

Quarter	1	2	3	4	Total
Bulldogs	0	10	7	6	23
Aztecs	10	6	0	10	26

at Snapdragon Stadium • San Diego, California

- Date: October 17
- Game time: 7:30 p.m.
- Game weather: Clear • Temperature: 80 °F (27 °C) • Wind: N at 2 miles per hour (3.2 km/h)
- Game attendance: 21,847
- Referee: Preston Clipper
- TV announcers (CBSSN): Rich Waltz (play-by-play), Adam Breneman (analyst) and Jordan Giorgio (sideline)

Game information

First quarter

- (6:16) SDSU - Cooper DiLeva 32-yard field goal, (Drive: 6 plays, 18 yards, 2:48; San Diego State 3-0)
- (1:58) SDSU - Jaylon Hawkins 52-yard pass from Jayden Denegal (Cooper DiLeva kick), (Drive: 6 plays, 75 yards, 2:11; San Diego State 10-0)

Second quarter

- (11:34) SDSU - Cooper DiLeva 30-yard field goal, (Drive: 9 plays, 61 yards, 3:42; San Diego State 13-0)
- (7:48) FRES - Manaki Watanabe 51-yard field goal, (Drive: 9 plays, 42 yards, 3:46; San Diego State 13-3)
- (4:02) FRES - Bryson Donelson 4-yard run (Manaki Watanabe kick), (Drive: 5 plays, 38 yards, 2:42; San Diego State 13-10)
- (0:01) SDSU - Cooper DiLeva 40-yard field goal, (Drive: 4 plays, 5 yards, 1:05; San Diego State 16-10)

Third quarter

- (5:16) FRES - Julius Gillick 7-yard run (Manaki Watanabe kick), (Drive: 10 plays, 75 yards, 4:55; Fresno State 17-16)

Fourth quarter

- (12:00) SDSU - Jordan Napier 7-yard pass from Bert Emanuel Jr. (Cooper DiLeva kick), (Drive: 6 plays, 92 yards, 3:00; San Diego State 23-17)
- (5:02) FRES - Julius Gillick 2-yard run (kick failed), (Drive: 11 plays, 75 yards, 6:58; Tied 23-23)
- (0:57) SDSU - Cooper DiLeva 53-yard field goal, (Drive: 10 plays, 41 yards, 3:48; San Diego State 26-23)

Statistics	FRES	SDSU
First downs	18	17
Plays–yards	65–276	62–384
Rushes–yards	40–135	40–204
Passing yards	141	180
Passing: comp–att–int	13–25–0	14–22–0
Time of possession	31:34	28:26

Team	Category	Player	Statistics
Fresno State	Passing	Jayden Mandal	13/25, 141 yards
Fresno State	Rushing	Bryson Donelson	13 carries, 62 yards, TD
Fresno State	Receiving	Josiah Freeman	3 receptions, 49 yards
San Diego State	Passing	Jayden Denegal	7/10, 112 yards, TD
San Diego State	Rushing	Lucky Sutton	18 carries, 110 yards
San Diego State	Receiving	Jaylon Hawkins	6 receptions, 84 yards, TD

=== Oregon State ===
Oregon State Beavers (5–2) at Fresno State Bulldogs (4–3) – Game summary

Quarter	1	2	3	4	Total
Beavers	3	6	7	6	22
Bulldogs	7	14	17	0	38

at Valley Children's Stadium • Fresno, California

- Date: October 31
- Game time: 8:00 p.m.
- TV: USA

Statistics	ORST	FRES
First downs		
Plays–yards		
Rushes–yards		
Passing yards		
Passing: comp–att–int		
Time of possession		

Team	Category	Player	Statistics
Oregon State	Passing		
Oregon State	Rushing		
Oregon State	Receiving		
Fresno State	Passing		
Fresno State	Rushing		
Fresno State	Receiving		

=== at Utah State ===
Fresno State Bulldogs (5–3) at Utah State Aggies (3–5) – Game summary

Quarter	1	2	3	4	Total
Bulldogs	0	0	0	0	0
Aggies	0	0	0	0	0

at Maverik Stadium • Logan, Utah

- Date: November 7
- Game time: 6:30 p.m.
- TV: USA

Statistics	FRES	USU
First downs		
Plays–yards		
Rushes–yards		
Passing yards		
Passing: comp–att–int		
Time of possession		

Team	Category	Player	Statistics
Fresno State	Passing		
Fresno State	Rushing		
Fresno State	Receiving		
Utah State	Passing		
Utah State	Rushing		
Utah State	Receiving		

=== at Texas State ===
Fresno State Bulldogs (5–4) at Texas State Bobcats (5–4) – Game summary

Quarter	1	2	3	4	Total
Bulldogs	0	0	0	0	0
Bobcats	0	0	0	0	0

at UFCU Stadium • San Marcos, Texas

- Date: November 14
- Game time: 1:00 p.m.
- TV: The CW

Statistics	FRES	TXST
First downs		
Plays–yards		
Rushes–yards		
Passing yards		
Passing: comp–att–int		
Time of possession		

Team	Category	Player	Statistics
Fresno State	Passing		
Fresno State	Rushing		
Fresno State	Receiving		
Texas State	Passing		
Texas State	Rushing		
Texas State	Receiving		

=== Colorado State ===
Colorado State Rams (3–7) at Fresno State Bulldogs (5–5) – Game summary

Quarter	1	2	3	4	Total
Rams	0	0	0	0	0
Bulldogs	0	0	0	0	0

at Valley Children's Stadium • Fresno, California

- Date: November 21
- Game time: 4:30 p.m.
- TV: The CW

Statistics	CSU	FRES
First downs		
Plays–yards		
Rushes–yards		
Passing yards		
Passing: comp–att–int		
Time of possession		

Team	Category	Player	Statistics
Colorado State	Passing		
Colorado State	Rushing		
Colorado State	Receiving		
Fresno State	Passing		
Fresno State	Rushing		
Fresno State	Receiving		

=== Pac-12 Opponent TBA ===
Pac-12 opponent TBA at Fresno State Bulldogs (0–0) – Game summary

Quarter	1	2	3	4	Total
TBA	0	0	0	0	0
Bulldogs	0	0	0	0	0

at Valley Children's Stadium • Fresno, California

- Date: November 28
- Game time: TBD

Statistics	TBA	FRES
First downs		
Plays–yards		
Rushes–yards		
Passing yards		
Passing: comp–att–int		
Time of possession		

Team	Category	Player	Statistics
Pac-12 opponent TBA	Passing		
Pac-12 opponent TBA	Rushing		
Pac-12 opponent TBA	Receiving		
Fresno State	Passing		
Fresno State	Rushing		
Fresno State	Receiving		
