= 2025 Nevada Wolf Pack football team =

American college football season

2025 Nevada Wolf Pack football
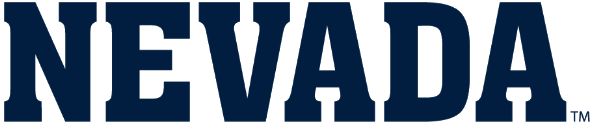
- Conference: Mountain West Conference
- Record: 3–9 (2–6 MW)
- Head coach: Jeff Choate (2nd season)
- Offensive coordinator: David Gilbertson (1st season)
- Offensive scheme: Multiple
- Defensive coordinator: Kane Ioane (2nd season)
- Base defense: 4–2–5
- Home stadium: Mackay Stadium

2025 Mountain West Conference football standings
	Conf.			Overall
Team	W		L	W		L
Boise State y$	6	–	2	9	–	5
UNLV y	6	–	2	10	–	4
San Diego State	6	–	2	9	–	4
New Mexico	6	–	2	9	–	4
Fresno State	5	–	3	9	–	4
Hawaii	5	–	3	9	–	4
Utah State	4	–	4	6	–	7
Air Force	3	–	5	4	–	8
Nevada	2	–	6	3	–	9
Wyoming	2	–	6	4	–	8
San Jose State	2	–	6	3	–	9
Colorado State	1	–	7	2	–	10
Championship: Boise State 38, UNLV 21
$ – Conference champion; y – Championship game participant; Rankings from CFP Rankings

The 2025 Nevada Wolf Pack football team represented the University of Nevada, Reno in the Mountain West Conference during the 2025 NCAA Division I FBS football season. The Wolf Pack were led by Jeff Choate in his second year as the head coach. The Wolf Pack played their home games at Mackay Stadium, located in Reno, Nevada.

== Offseason ==
=== Transfers ===
==== Outgoing ====
Player	Position	Destination
Aiden Kehm	OL	Arkansas State
Tyson Ruffins	OL	California
Drue Watts	LB	Memphis
Brendon Lewis	QB	Memphis
Isaiah World	OL	Oregon
Josiah Timoteo	OL	Oregon State
Chad Brown	DB	Purdue
KK Meier	S	UTSA
Michael Coats Jr.	DB	West Virginia
Cortez Braham Jr.	WR	Unknown
Kitione Tau	DL	Unknown
Henry Ikahihifo	DL	Unknown
Keyshawn Cobb	S	Unknown
Tori Daffin	DB	Unknown
Devin Gunter	DB	Unknown
Ike Nnakenyi	DE	Unknown
Jonah Lewis	DB	Unknown
Luke Farr	OL	Unknown
Carter Jula	P	Unknown
Mackavelli Malotumau	DL	Unknown
Tooni Ikahihifo Jr.	DB	Unknown
Sean Dollars	RB	Withdrawn
Chubba Purdy	QB	Withdrawn

==== Incoming ====
Player	Position	Previous school
Johnathan Correa	DL	American River CC
Bryce Echols	DL	Arizona
Ed Rhambo	DB	Bowling Green
Bryson Snelling	DB	Butte CC
Jeremiah Beck	TE	Chaffey CC
Hayden McDonald	S	Columbia
Jett Carpenter	TE	Eastern Washington
Jack Foster	OL	Idaho
Nahji Logan	LB	Indiana
Nick Rempert	WR	North Texas
Luke McEndoo	RB	Oklahoma State
Hadine Diaby	OL	Tennessee State
Jordan Brown	WR	Texas Tech
Herschel Turner	RB	Utah State
Logologo Va'a	DL	UTEP
Aj Odums	DB	UTEP
Zavien Abercrombie	DB	Weber State

== Preseason ==
=== Mountain West media poll ===
The Mountain West's preseason media poll was released on July 16, 2025. Nevada was predicted to finish in last place in the conference.

== Schedule ==
Date	Time	Opponent	Site	TV	Result	Attendance
August 30	12:30 p.m.	at No. 2 Penn State*	Beaver Stadium; University Park, PA	CBS	L 11–46	106,915
September 6	2:00 p.m.	No. 18 (FCS) Sacramento State*	Mackay Stadium; Reno, NV	KNSN-TV	W 20–17	20,535
September 13	2:00 p.m.	Middle Tennessee*	Mackay Stadium; Reno, NV	KNSN-TV	L 13–14	16,808
September 20	4:00 p.m.	at Western Kentucky*	Houchens Industries–L. T. Smith Stadium; Bowling Green, KY	ESPN+	L 16–31	17,247
October 4	7:30 p.m.	at Fresno State	Valley Children's Stadium; Fresno, CA	CBSSN	L 17–20	40,005
October 11	7:30 p.m.	San Diego State	Mackay Stadium; Reno, NV	CBSSN	L 10–44	19,473
October 18	6:45 p.m.	at New Mexico	University Stadium; Albuquerque, NM	FS1	L 22–24	18,233
October 24	7:00 p.m.	Boise State	Mackay Stadium; Reno, NV (rivalry)	CBSSN	L 3–24	18,029
November 8	4:30 p.m.	at Utah State	Maverik Stadium; Logan, UT	CBSSN	L 14–51	19,418
November 15	12:30 p.m.	San Jose State	Mackay Stadium; Reno, NV	CBSSN	W 55–10	14,491
November 22	11:00 a.m.	at Wyoming	War Memorial Stadium; Laramie, WY	Altitude	W 13–7	25,650
November 29	6:00 p.m.	UNLV	Mackay Stadium; Reno, NV (Fremont Cannon)	CBSSN	L 17–42	17,912
*Non-conference game; Rankings from AP Poll - Released prior to game; All times are in Pacific time

== Game summaries ==
=== at No. 2 Penn State ===
Nevada Wolf Pack (0–0) at No. 2 Penn State Nittany Lions (0–0) – Game summary

Quarter	1	2	3	4	Total
Wolf Pack	0	3	0	8	11
No. 2 Nittany Lions	10	17	12	7	46

at Beaver Stadium • University Park, Pennsylvania

- Date: August 30
- Game time: 3:30 p.m. EDT
- Game weather: 70 °F (21 °C) • Sunny
- Game attendance: 106,915
- Referee: Matthew Richards
- TV announcers (CBS): Brad Nessler (play-by-play), Gary Danielson (color commentator), and Jenny Dell (sideline reporter)
- ESPN box score, GoPSUsports.com box score

Game information

First quarter

- PSU – Nicholas Singleton 1-yard run (Ryan Barker kick), 3:05. Nittany Lions 7–0. Drive: 13 plays, 69 yards, 6:41.
- PSU – Ryan Barker 28-yard field goal, 1:41. Nittany Lions 10–0. Drive: 4 plays, -4 yards, 1:16.

Second quarter

- PSU – Kaytron Allen 12-yard run (Ryan Barker kick), 10:02. Nittany Lions 17–0. Drive: 8 plays, 72 yards, 4:18.
- NEV – Joe McFadden 28-yard field goal, 4:52. Nittany Lions 17–3. Drive: 9 plays, 59 yards, 5:05.
- PSU – Ryan Barker 28-yard field goal, 2:22. Nittany Lions 20–3. Drive: 4 plays, 7 yards, 2:18.
- PSU – Kyron Hudson 31-yard pass from Drew Allar (Ryan Barker kick), 0:23. Nittany Lions 27–3. Drive: 8 plays, 64 yards, 1:15.

Third quarter

- PSU – Ryan Barker 32-yard field goal, 9:23. Nittany Lions 30–3. Drive: 9 plays, 60 yards, 5:32.
- PSU – Nicholas Singleton 1-yard run (pass failed), 7:15. Nittany Lions 36–3. Drive: 2 plays, 16 yards, 0:21.
- PSU – Ryan Barker 39-yard field goal, 3:21. Nittany Lions 39–3. Drive: 5 plays, 23 yards, 1:26.

Fourth quarter

- PSU – Ethan Grunkemeyer 6-yard run (Matthew Parker kick), 7:37. Nittany Lions 46–3. Drive: 15 plays, 94 yards, 7:10.
- NEV – Marcus Bellon 9-yard pass from AJ Bianco (AJ Bianco–Jett Carpenter pass), 0:25. Nittany Lions 46–11. Drive: 8 plays, 50 yards, 1:29.

Statistics	NEV	PSU
First downs	13	25
Plays–yards	52–203	71–438
Rushes–yards	31–78	36–135
Passing yards	125	303
Passing: comp–att–int	11–21–1	29–35–0
Turnovers	3	0
Time of possession	26:20	33:40

Team	Category	Player	Statistics
Nevada	Passing	Chubba Purdy	7/15, 97 yards, INT
Nevada	Rushing	Chubba Purdy	14 carries, 55 yards
Nevada	Receiving	Marcus Bellon	6 receptions, 76 yards, TD
Penn State	Passing	Drew Allar	22/26, 217 yards, TD
Penn State	Rushing	Kaytron Allen	8 carries, 43 yards, TD
Penn State	Receiving	Kyron Hudson	6 receptions, 89 yards, TD

=== No. 18 (FCS) Sacramento State ===
No. 18 (FCS) Sacramento State Hornets (0–1) at Nevada Wolf Pack (0–1) – Game summary

Quarter	1	2	3	4	Total
No. 18 (FCS) Hornets	7	10	0	0	17
Wolf Pack	0	13	0	7	20

at Mackay Stadium • Reno, NV

- Date: September 6, 2025
- Game time: 2:00 p.m. PDT
- Game attendance: 20,535
- Referee: Brad Carrell
- TV announcers (KNSN-TV): Alex Marguiles (play-by-play), Lucas Weber (analyst) and Shannon Kelly (sideline)

Game information

First quarter

- SAC – Rodney Hammond Jr. 5-yard run (Grant Meadors kick), 10:55. Hornets 7–0. Drive: 9 plays, 75 yards, 4:05.

Second quarter

- SAC – Grant Meadors 35-yard field goal, 13:04. Hornets 10–0. Drive: 16 plays, 81 yards, 7:59.
- NEV – Joe McFadden 37-yard field goal, 7:17. Hornets 10–3. Drive: 10 plays, 60 yards, 5:47.
- NEV – Chubba Purdy 3-yard run (Joe McFadden kick), 1:02. Tied 10–10. Drive: 6 plays, 45 yards, 2:51.
- SAC – Ernest Campbell 75-yard pass from Cardell Williams (Grant Meadors kick), 0:53. Hornets 17–10. Drive: 1 play, 75 yards, 0:09.
- NEV – Joe McFadden 40-yard field goal, 0:00. Hornets 17–13. Drive: 6 plays, 52 yards, 0:53.

Third quarter

No scoring plays.

Fourth quarter

- NEV – Jonathan Maldonado 36-yard interception return (Joe McFadden kick), 2:17. Wolf Pack 20–17.

Statistics	SAC	NEV
First downs	15	23
Plays–yards	60–371	69–413
Rushes–yards	41–146	48–269
Passing yards	225	144
Passing: Comp–Att–Int	14–19–1	12–21–2
Turnovers	1	2
Time of possession	27:14	32:42

Team	Category	Player	Statistics
Sacramento State	Passing	Cardell Williams	11/13, 158 yards, TD, INT
Sacramento State	Rushing	Jamar Curtis	8 carries, 37 yards
Sacramento State	Receiving	Ernest Campbell	3 receptions, 89 yards, TD
Nevada	Passing	Chubba Purdy	12/21, 144 yards, 2 INT
Nevada	Rushing	Chubba Purdy	21 carries, 115 yards, TD
Nevada	Receiving	Marcus Bellon	2 receptions, 59 yards

=== Middle Tennessee ===
Middle Tennessee Blue Raiders (0–2) at Nevada Wolf Pack (1–1) – Game summary

Quarter	1	2	3	4	Total
Blue Raiders	0	0	0	14	14
Wolf Pack	0	13	0	0	13

at Mackay Stadium • Reno, NV

- Date: September 13, 2025
- Game time: 2:00 p.m. PDT
- Game weather: Sunny • Temperature: 78 °F (26 °C) • Wind: SE at 3 miles per hour (4.8 km/h)
- Game attendance: 16,808
- Referee: Kenneth Ray
- TV announcers (KNSN-TV): Alex Margulies (play-by-play), Lucas Weber (analyst) and Shannon Kelly (sideline)

Game information

First quarter

- No scoring plays.

Second quarter

- (14:52) NEV – Ky Woods 47-yard pass from Chubba Purdy, Joe McFadden kick (Drive: 1 play, 47 yards, 0:08; Nevada 7–0)
- (8:59) NEV – Joe McFadden 38-yard field goal (Drive: 6 plays, 46 yards, 2:36; Nevada 10–0)
- (1:02) NEV – Joe McFadden 33-yard field goal (Drive: 7 plays, 18 yards, 2:44; Nevada 13–0)

Third quarter

- No scoring plays.

Fourth quarter

- (14:52) MTSU – Nahzae Cox 13-yard pass from Nicholas Vattiato, Jacob Hathaway kick (Drive: 10 plays, 60 yards, 3:59; Nevada 13–7)
- (14:52) MTSU – Nicholas Vattiato 5-yard run, Jacob Hathaway kick (Drive: 11 plays, 76 yards, 1:54; Middle Tennessee 14–13)

Statistics	MTSU	NEV
First downs	23	16
Plays–yards	75–352	60–369
Rushes–yards	30–105	35–203
Passing yards	247	166
Passing: Comp–Att–Int	27–45–1	14–25–2
Turnovers	1	2
Time of possession	31:10	28:50

Team	Category	Player	Statistics
Middle Tennessee	Passing	Nicholas Vattiato	27/44, 247 yards, TD, INT
Middle Tennessee	Rushing	Jekail Middlebrook	10 carries, 67 yards
Middle Tennessee	Receiving	Myles Butler	7 receptions, 65 yards
Nevada	Passing	Chubba Purdy	5/7, 88 yards, TD, INT
Nevada	Rushing	Herschel Turner	12 carries, 90 yards
Nevada	Receiving	Jordan Brown	5 receptions, 58 yards

=== at Western Kentucky ===
Nevada Wolf Pack (1–2) at Western Kentucky Hilltoppers (2–1) – Game summary

Quarter	1	2	3	4	Total
Wolf Pack	3	7	3	3	16
Hilltoppers	3	0	7	21	31

at Houchens Industries–L. T. Smith Stadium • Bowling Green, KY

- Date: September 20, 2025
- Game time: 6:00 p.m. CDT
- Game weather: Sunny • Temperature: 69 °F (21 °C)
- Game attendance: 17,247
- Referee: Rodney Burnette
- TV announcers (ESPN+): Tyler Eaton (play-by-play) and Terry Obee (analyst)

Game information

First quarter

- (5:17) NEV - Joe McFadden 42-yard field goal Drive: 8 plays, 47 yards, 4:22; (Wolf Pack 3-0)
- (2:16) WKU - John Cannon 40-yard field goal Drive: 7 plays, 38 yards, 3:01; (TIED 3-3)

Second quarter

- (6:57) NEV - Chubba Purdy 6-yard run (Joe McFadden kick) Drive: 3 plays, 46 yards, 1:24; (Wolf Pack 10-3)

Third quarter

- (11:08) WKU - La'Vell Wright 2-yard run (John Cannon kick) Drive: 9 plays, 75 yards, 3:52; (TIED 10-10)
- (7:28) NEV - Joe McFadden 43-yard field goal Drive: 6 plays, 45 yards, 3:33; (Wolf Pack 13-10)

Fourth quarter

- (11:23) WKU - George Hart III 8-yard run (John Cannon kick) Drive: 9 plays, 85 yards, 4:02; (Hilltoppers 17-13)
- (1:49) WKU - La'Vell Wright 8-yard run (John Cannon kick) Drive: 14 plays, 87 yards, 5:34; (Hilltoppers 24-13)
- (0:29) NEV - Joe McFadden 22-yard field goal Drive: 12 plays, 69 yards, 1:20; (Hilltoppers 24-16)
- (0:23) WKU - Matthew Henry 48-yard kickoff return (John Cannon kick) (Hilltoppers 31-16)

Statistics	NEV	WKU
First downs	22	22
Plays–yards	72–372	66–361
Rushes–yards	39–207	33–145
Passing yards	165	216
Passing: Comp–Att–Int	16–33–2	22–33–1
Turnovers	3	2
Time of possession	32:16	27:44

Team	Category	Player	Statistics
Nevada	Passing	Chubba Purdy	16/30, 165 yards, 2 INT
Nevada	Rushing	Caleb Ramseur	9 carries, 66 yards
Nevada	Receiving	Jett Carpenter	6 receptions, 70 yards
Western Kentucky	Passing	Maverick McIvor	22/33, 216 yards, INT
Western Kentucky	Rushing	George Hart III	11 carries, 63 yards, TD
Western Kentucky	Receiving	Noah Meyers	6 receptions, 81 yards

=== at Fresno State ===
Nevada Wolf Pack (1–3) at Fresno State Bulldogs (4–1) – Game summary

Quarter	1	2	3	4	Total
Wolf Pack	3	0	7	7	17
Bulldogs	0	20	0	0	20

at Valley Children's Stadium • Fresno, CA

- Date: October 4, 2025
- Game time: 7:30 p.m. PDT
- Game weather: Sunny
- Game attendance: 40,005
- Referee: Gary Reed
- TV announcers (CBSSN): Jason Knapp (play-by-play) and Taylor McHargue (analyst)

Game information

First quarter

- (1:59) NEV – Joe McFadden 29-yard field goal (Drive: 8 plays, 42 yards, 3:38; Nevada 3–0)

Second quarter

- (9:46) FRES – Dylan Lynch 21-yard field goal (Drive: 9 plays, 28 yards, 5:01; Tied 3–3)
- (8:25) FRES – Josiah Freeman 12-yard pass from EJ Warner, Dylan Lynch kick (Drive: 3 plays, 29 yards, 1:15; Fresno State 10–3)
- (3:19) FRES – Dylan Lynch 38-yard field goal (Drive: 5 plays, 71 yards, 3:03; Fresno State 13–3)
- (0:32) FRES – Josiah Freeman 24-yard pass from EJ Warner, Dylan Lynch kick (Drive: 6 plays, 66 yards, 1:01; Fresno State 20–3)

Third quarter

- (0:43) NEV – Dakota Thomas 15-yard pass from Carter Jones, Joe McFadden kick (Drive: 10 plays, 46 yards, 4:52; Fresno State 20–10)

Fourth quarter

- (12:36) NEV – Caleb Ramseur 17-yard pass from Carter Jones, Joe McFadden kick (Drive: 4 plays, 65 yards, 2:08; Fresno State 20–17)

Statistics	NEV	FRES
First downs	13	16
Plays–yards	55–246	62–342
Rushes–yards	34–129	36–152
Passing yards	117	190
Passing: Comp–Att–Int	12–21–3	18–26–1
Turnovers	4	1
Time of possession	27:11	32:49

Team	Category	Player	Statistics
Nevada	Passing	Carter Jones	11/15, 121 yards, 2 TD, INT
Nevada	Rushing	Caleb Ramseur	16 carries, 77 yards
Nevada	Receiving	Nate Burleson II	1 reception, 45 yards
Fresno State	Passing	E.J. Warner	18/26, 190 yards 2 TD, INT
Fresno State	Rushing	Rayshon Luke	9 carries, 83 yards
Fresno State	Receiving	Richie Anderson III	7 receptions, 67 yards

=== San Diego State ===
San Diego State Aztecs (4–1) at Nevada Wolf Pack (1–4) – Game summary

Quarter	1	2	3	4	Total
Aztecs	14	21	9	0	44
Wolf Pack	0	0	0	10	10

at Mackay Stadium • Reno, NV

- Date: October 11, 2025
- Game time: 7:30 p.m. PDT
- Game weather: Cloudy, 50 °F (10 °C), wind NW 15 mph (24 km/h)
- Game attendance: 19,473
- Referee: Kenneth Ray
- TV announcers (CBSSN): John Sadak (play-by-play), Taylor McHargue (analyst) and Brandon Baylor (sideline)

Game information

First quarter

- SDSU (14:01) – Jordan Napier 75-yard punt return (Gabriel Plascencia kick); Drive: 3 plays, -2 yards, 0:59 (Aztecs 7–0)
- SDSU (7:11) – Chris Johnson 40-yard interception return (Gabriel Plascencia kick); Drive: 5 plays, 15 yards, 2:06 (Aztecs 14–0)

Second quarter

- SDSU (15:00) – Jayden Denegal 2-yard pass to Christian Washington (Gabriel Plascencia kick); Drive: 7 plays, 70 yards, 3:26 (Aztecs 21–0)
- SDSU (9:05) – Jayden Denegal 31-yard pass to Jacob Bostick (Gabriel Plascencia kick); Drive: 7 plays, 73 yards, 3:27 (Aztecs 28–0)
- SDSU (1:46) – Lucky Sutton 3-yard run (Gabriel Plascencia kick); Drive: 6 plays, 93 yards, 2:36 (Aztecs 35–0)

Third quarter

- SDSU (10:49) – Gabriel Plascencia 21-yard field goal; Drive: 10 plays, 64 yards, 4:11 (Aztecs 38–0)
- SDSU (7:05) – Gabriel Plascencia 45-yard field goal; Drive: 5 plays, 30 yards, 2:33 (Aztecs 41–0)
- SDSU (2:03) – Gabriel Plascencia 49-yard field goal; Drive: 7 plays, 34 yards, 3:33 (Aztecs 44–0)

Fourth quarter

- NEV (12:50) – Joe McFadden 34-yard field goal; Drive: 9 plays, 60 yards, 4:13 (Aztecs 44–3)
- NEV (2:32) – Jordan Brown 16-yard pass from Carter Jones (Joe McFadden kick); Drive: 10 plays, 81 yards, 3:10 (Aztecs 44–10)

Statistics	SDSU	NEV
First downs	19	15
Plays–yards	58–411	63–254
Rushes–yards	40–206	31–77
Passing yards	205	177
Passing: Comp–Att–Int	14–18–0	16–32–2
Turnovers	0	2
Time of possession	28:52	28:36

Team	Category	Player	Statistics
San Diego State	Passing	Jayden Denegal	14/17, 205 yards, 2 TD
San Diego State	Rushing	Lucky Sutton	16 carries, 76 yards, TD
San Diego State	Receiving	Jordan Napier	5 receptions, 110 yards
Nevada	Passing	Carter Jones	16/32, 177 yards, TD, 2 INT
Nevada	Rushing	Caleb Ramseur	8 carries, 35 yards
Nevada	Receiving	Jett Carpenter	3 receptions, 72 yards

=== at New Mexico ===
Nevada Wolf Pack (1–5) at New Mexico Lobos (3–3) – Game summary

Quarter	1	2	3	4	Total
Wolf Pack	3	9	7	3	22
Lobos	7	7	10	0	24

at University Stadium • Albuquerque, NM

- Date: October 18, 2025
- Game time: 6:45 p.m. PDT
- Game attendance: 18,233
- Referee: Christian Watson
- TV announcers (FS1): Dan Hellie (play-by-play) and Petros Papadakis (analyst)

Game information

First quarter

- UNM – D.J. McKinney 2-yard run (Luke Drzewiecki kick), 7:16. Lobos 7–0. Drive: 16 plays, 75 yards, 7:44.
- NEV – Joe McFadden 33-yard field goal, 3:41. Lobos 7–3. Drive: 4 plays, 1 yard, 1:56.

Second quarter

- UNM – Scottre Humphrey 1-yard run (Luke Drzewiecki kick), 6:51. Lobos 14–3. Drive: 11 plays, 91 yards, 6:23.
- NEV – Joe McFadden 36-yard field goal, 1:51. Lobos 14–6. Drive: 10 plays, 56 yards, 5:00.
- NEV – Caleb Ramseur 3-yard run (pass failed), 0:41. Lobos 14–12. Drive: 3 plays, 22 yards, 0:33.

Third quarter

- UNM – D.J. McKinney 22-yard run (Luke Drzewiecki kick), 11:45. Lobos 21–12. Drive: 4 plays, 32 yards, 1:12.
- NEV – Caleb Ramseur 4-yard run (Joe McFadden kick), 3:25. Lobos 21–19. Drive: 15 plays, 75 yards, 8:20.
- UNM – Luke Drzewiecki 29-yard field goal, 0:00. Lobos 24–19. Drive: 7 plays, 63 yards, 3:25.

Fourth quarter

- NEV – Joe McFadden 41-yard field goal, 10:55. Lobos 24–22. Drive: 9 plays, 51 yards, 4:05.

Statistics	NEV	UNM
First downs	16	22
Plays–yards	57–257	64–348
Rushes–yards	28–55	42–210
Passing yards	202	138
Passing: Comp–Att–Int	23–29–0	14–22–0
Turnovers	0	2
Time of possession	29:27	30:33

Team	Category	Player	Statistics
Nevada	Passing	Carter Jones	23/29, 202 yards
Nevada	Rushing	Caleb Ramseur	14 carries, 39 yards, 2 TD
Nevada	Receiving	Marshaun Brown	7 receptions, 75 yards
New Mexico	Passing	Jack Layne	14/22, 138 yards
New Mexico	Rushing	Jack Layne	8 carries, 71 yards
New Mexico	Receiving	Dorian Thomas	5 receptions, 56 yards

=== Boise State (rivalry) ===
Boise State Broncos (5–2) at Nevada Wolf Pack (1–6) – Game summary

Quarter	1	2	3	4	Total
Broncos	3	7	7	7	24
Wolf Pack	3	0	0	0	3

at Mackay Stadium • Reno, NV

- Date: October 24, 2025
- Game time: 7:00 p.m. PDT
- Game weather: Cloudy • Temperature: 59 °F (15 °C) • Wind: SW 13 mph
- Game attendance: 18,029
- Referee: Cal McNeill
- TV announcers (CBSSN): Rich Waltz (play-by-play), Robert Turbin (analyst) and Jordan Giorgio (sideline)

Game information

First quarter

- (3:50) NEV – Joe McFadden 40-yard field goal (Drive: 12 plays, 57 yards, 7:16; Nevada 3–0)
- (0:00) BOIS – Colton Boomer 21-yard field goal (Drive: 13 plays, 73 yards, 3:50; Tied 3–3)

Second quarter

- (1:35) BOIS – Sire Gaines 2-yard run, Colton Boomer kick (Drive: 13 plays, 94 yards, 5:53; Boise State 10–3)

Third quarter

- (1:41) BOIS – Maddux Madsen 1-yard run, Colton Boomer kick (Drive: 4 plays, 6 yards, 2:08; Boise State 17–3)

Fourth quarter

- (3:09) BOIS – Dylan Riley 1-yard run, Colton Boomer kick (Drive: 15 plays, 80 yards, 8:18; Boise State 24–3)

Statistics	BOIS	NEV
First downs	21	15
Plays–yards	76–309	54–249
Rushes–yards	48–134	23–101
Passing yards	175	148
Passing: Comp–Att–Int	15–28–1	18–31–3
Turnovers	1	5
Time of possession	35:58	24:02

Team	Category	Player	Statistics
Boise State	Passing	Maddux Madsen	15/28, 175 yards, INT
Boise State	Rushing	Sire Gaines	17 carries, 61 yards, TD
Boise State	Receiving	Cameron Bates	1 reception, 37 yards
Nevada	Passing	Carter Jones	16/29, 145 yards, 3 INT
Nevada	Rushing	Herschel Turner	7 carries, 77 yards
Nevada	Receiving	Marshaun Brown	4 receptions, 35 yards

=== at Utah State ===
Nevada Wolf Pack (1–7) at Utah State Aggies (4–4) – Game summary

Quarter	1	2	3	4	Total
Wolf Pack	0	0	7	7	14
Aggies	24	17	7	3	51

at Maverik Stadium • Logan, UT

- Date: November 8, 2025
- Game time: 5:30 p.m. MST
- Game attendance: 19,418
- Referee: Nolan Dumas
- TV announcers (CBSSN): Chris Lewis (play-by-play) and Randy Cross (analyst)

Game information

First quarter

- USU – Brady Boyd 53-yard pass from Bryson Barnes (Tanner Rinker kick), 13:19. Aggies 7–0. Drive: 4 plays, 75 yards, 1:41.
- USU – Miles Davis 3-yard run (Tanner Rinker kick), 8:21. Aggies 14–0. Drive: 8 plays, 69 yards, 2:54.
- USU – Tanner Rinker 32-yard field goal, 2:39. Aggies 17–0. Drive: 8 plays, 65 yards, 3:38.
- USU – Brevin Hamblin 38-yard interception return (Tanner Rinker kick), 1:46. Aggies 24–0.

Second quarter

- USU – Tanner Rinker 44-yard field goal, 11:09. Aggies 27–0. Drive: 10 plays, 38 yards, 4:15.
- USU – Anthony Garcia 15-yard pass from Bryson Barnes (Tanner Rinker kick), 7:54. Aggies 34–0. Drive: 5 plays, 39 yards, 2:21.
- USU – Miles Davis 1-yard run (Tanner Rinker kick), 0:07. Aggies 41–0. Drive: 10 plays, 42 yards, 1:42.

Third quarter

- USU – Brady Boyd 21-yard pass from Bryson Barnes (Tanner Rinker kick), 7:45. Aggies 48–0. Drive: 7 plays, 76 yards, 3:39.
- NEV – Caleb Ramseur 41-yard pass from Chubba Purdy (Joe McFadden kick), 4:18. Aggies 48–7. Drive: 6 plays, 65 yards, 3:27.

Fourth quarter

- NEV – Jett Carpenter 34-yard pass from Chubba Purdy (Joe McFadden kick), 8:11. Aggies 48–14. Drive: 2 plays, 39 yards, 0:52.
- USU – Tanner Rinker 21-yard field goal, 5:13. Aggies 51–14. Drive: 6 plays, 67 yards, 2:58.

Statistics	NEV	USU
First downs	11	23
Plays–yards	57–242	75–522
Rushes–yards	33–120	40–145
Passing yards	122	377
Passing: Comp–Att–Int	10–24–2	24–35–0
Turnovers	3	0
Time of possession	27:38	32:22

Team	Category	Player	Statistics
Nevada	Passing	Chubba Purdy	3/7, 80 yards, 2 TD
Nevada	Rushing	Chubba Purdy	10 carries, 45 yards
Nevada	Receiving	Jett Carpenter	4 receptions, 58 yards, TD
Utah State	Passing	Bryson Barnes	20/27, 288 yards, 3 TD
Utah State	Rushing	Bryson Barnes	9 carries, 40 yards
Utah State	Receiving	Brady Boyd	5 receptions, 117 yards, 2 TD

=== San Jose State ===
San Jose State Spartans (3-6) at Nevada Wolf Pack (1-8) – Game summary

Quarter	1	2	3	4	Total
Spartans	0	0	3	7	10
Wolf Pack	14	17	7	17	55

at Mackay Stadium • Reno, NV

- Date: November 15, 2025
- Game time: 12:30 p.m. PST
- Game weather: Sunny, 59°F, East wind at 5 mph
- Game attendance: 14,491
- Referee: Cal McNeill
- TV announcers (CBSSN): Fran Charles (play-by-play) and Taylor McHargue (analyst)

Game information

First quarter

- NEV – Nakian Jackson 66-yard interception return (Joe McFadden kick), 9:24. Wolf Pack 7–0.
- NEV – Chubba Purdy 7-yard pass from Carter Jones (Joe McFadden kick), 6:20. Wolf Pack 14–0. Drive: 5 plays, 30 yards, 2:59.

Second quarter

- NEV – Caleb Ramseur 30-yard pass from Carter Jones (Joe McFadden kick), 12:21. Wolf Pack 21–0. Drive: 13 plays, 78 yards, 7:52.
- NEV – Chubba Purdy 13-yard run (Joe McFadden kick), 10:49. Wolf Pack 28–0. Drive: 1 play, 13 yards, 0:06.
- NEV – Joe McFadden 50-yard field goal, 0:01. Wolf Pack 31–0. Drive: 3 plays, 22 yards, 0:17.

Third quarter

- SJSU – Mathias Brown 46-yard field goal, 8:12. Wolf Pack 31–3. Drive: 7 plays, 52 yards, 2:42.
- NEV – Caleb Ramseur 11-yard run (Joe McFadden kick), 2:53. Wolf Pack 38–3. Drive: 8 plays, 75 yards, 5:19.

Fourth quarter

- NEV – Dominic Kelly 5-yard run (Joe McFadden kick), 10:57. Wolf Pack 45–3. Drive: 6 plays, 65 yards, 3:11.
- NEV – Joe McFadden 26-yard field goal, 4:37. Wolf Pack 48–3. Drive: 8 plays, 42 yards, 5:29.
- SJSU – Tama Amisone 12-yard run (Denis Lynch kick), 1:23. Wolf Pack 48–10. Drive: 8 plays, 75 yards, 3:14.
- NEV – Ky Woods 99-yard kickoff return (Joe McFadden kick), 1:10. Wolf Pack 55–10.

Statistics	SJSU	NEV
First downs	14	23
Plays–yards	58–270	61–413
Rushes–yards	26–125	42–218
Passing yards	145	195
Passing: Comp–Att–Int	16–32–4	16–19–0
Turnovers	5	0
Time of possession	22:35	37:25

Team	Category	Player	Statistics
San Jose State	Passing	Walker Eget	11/23, 74 yards, 3 INT
San Jose State	Rushing	Steve Chavez-Soto	8 carries, 47 yards
San Jose State	Receiving	Kyri Shoels	3 receptions, 47 yards
Nevada	Passing	Carter Jones	16/19, 195 yards, 2 TD
Nevada	Rushing	Caleb Ramseur	20 carries, 128 yards, TD
Nevada	Receiving	Dakota Thomas	6 receptions, 85 yards

=== at Wyoming ===
Nevada Wolf Pack (2-8) at Wyoming Cowboys (4-6) – Game summary

Quarter	1	2	3	4	Total
Wolf Pack	0	7	3	3	13
Cowboys	0	0	7	0	7

at War Memorial Stadium • Laramie, WY

- Date: November 22, 2025
- Game time: 11:00 a.m.
- Game weather: Sunny • 46 °F (8 °C) • wind SW 8 mph (13 km/h)
- Game attendance: 25,650
- Referee: Nolan Dumas
- TV announcers (Altitude): John Ramey (play-by-play) and Jared Petrino (analyst)

Game information

First quarter

- No scoring plays.

Second quarter

- (1:12) NEV – Jett Carpenter 8-yard pass from Carter Jones, Joe McFadden kick (Drive: 13 plays, 90 yards, 7:03; Nevada 7–0)

Third quarter

- (9:09) NEV – Joe McFadden 41-yard field goal (Drive: 7 plays, 60 yards, 4:12; Nevada 10–0)
- (1:27) WYO – Evan Svoboda 5-yard pass from Kaden Anderson, Erik Sandvik kick (Drive: 6 plays, 21 yards, 2:48; Nevada 10–7)

Fourth quarter

- (8:35) NEV – Joe McFadden 43-yard field goal (Drive: 12 plays, 49 yards, 7:52; Nevada 13–7)

Statistics	NEV	WYO
First downs	17	15
Plays–yards	58–271	64–220
Rushes–yards	40–213	23–68
Passing yards	58	152
Passing: Comp–Att–Int	11–18–0	23–41–0
Turnovers	1	0
Time of possession	34:50	25:10

Team	Category	Player	Statistics
Nevada	Passing	Carter Jones	11/17, 58 yards, TD
Nevada	Rushing	Caleb Ramseur	19 carries, 88 yards
Nevada	Receiving	Caleb Ramseur	1 reception, 21 yards
Wyoming	Passing	Kaden Anderson	22/39, 157 yards, TD
Wyoming	Rushing	Sam Scott	11 carries, 48 yards
Wyoming	Receiving	Michael Fitzgerald	4 receptions, 53 yards

=== UNLV (Fremont Cannon) ===
UNLV Rebels (9-2) at Nevada Wolf Pack (3-8) – Game summary

Quarter	1	2	3	4	Total
Rebels	7	21	7	7	42
Wolf Pack	3	0	7	7	17

at Mackay Stadium • Reno, NV

- Date: November 29, 2025
- Game time: 6:00 p.m. PST
- Game attendance: 17,912
- Referee: Patrick Foy
- TV announcers (CBSSN): Jordan Kent (play-by-play), Robert Turbin (analyst) and Jordan Giorgio (sideline)

Game information

First quarter

- UNLV – Jai'Den Thomas 17-yard run (Ramon Villela kick), 11:20. Rebels 7–0. Drive: 7 plays, 75 yards, 3:40.
- NEV – Joe McFadden 40-yard field goal, 1:05. Rebels 7–3. Drive: 9 plays, 36 yards, 5:17.

Second quarter

- UNLV – Troy Omeire 17-yard pass from Anthony Colandrea (Ramon Villela kick), 13:55. Rebels 14–3. Drive: 5 plays, 75 yards, 2:10.
- UNLV – Anthony Colandrea 17-yard run (Ramon Villela kick), 10:55. Rebels 21–3. Drive: 3 plays, 65 yards, 0:38.
- UNLV – Jai'Den Thomas 18-yard run (Ramon Villela kick), 4:09. Rebels 28–3. Drive: 9 plays, 73 yards, 5:15.

Third quarter

- NEV – Caleb Ramseur 17-yard run (Joe McFadden kick), 14:17. Rebels 28–10. Drive: 2 plays, 75 yards, 0:43.
- UNLV – Jai'Den Thomas 4-yard run (Ramon Villela kick), 12:13. Rebels 35–10. Drive: 5 plays, 75 yards, 2:04.

Fourth quarter

- UNLV – Jai'Den Thomas 1-yard run (Ramon Villela kick), 11:35. Rebels 42–10. Drive: 9 plays, 56 yards, 4:52.
- NEV – Caleb Ramseur 3-yard run (Joe McFadden kick), 4:38. Rebels 42–17. Drive: 12 plays, 75 yards, 6:57.

Statistics	UNLV	NEV
First downs	24	23
Plays–yards	55–496	67–341
Rushes–yards	33–226	33–193
Passing yards	270	148
Passing: Comp–Att–Int	15-22-2	23-34–0
Turnovers	2	2
Time of possession	27:09	32:51

Team	Category	Player	Statistics
UNLV	Passing	Anthony Colandrea	15/22, 270 yards, TD, 2 INT
UNLV	Rushing	Jai'Den Thomas	11 carries, 103 yards, 4 TD
UNLV	Receiving	Jaden Bradley	3 receptions, 71 yards
Nevada	Passing	Carter Jones	17/25, 105 yards
Nevada	Rushing	Caleb Ramseur	15 carries, 95 yards, 2 TD
Nevada	Receiving	Jett Carpenter	5 receptions, 56 yards
