= 2025 Fresno State Bulldogs football team =

American college football season

2025 Fresno State Bulldogs football

Arizona Bowl champion

Arizona Bowl, W 18–3 vs. Miami (OH)
- Conference: Mountain West Conference
- Record: 9–4 (5–3 MW)
- Head coach: Matt Entz (1st season)
- Offensive coordinator: Josh Davis (1st season)
- Offensive scheme: Pistol
- Defensive coordinator: Nick Benedetto (1st season)
- Base defense: 4–2–5
- Home stadium: Valley Children's Stadium

2025 Mountain West Conference football standings
	Conf.			Overall
Team	W		L	W		L
Boise State y$	6	–	2	9	–	5
UNLV y	6	–	2	10	–	4
San Diego State	6	–	2	9	–	4
New Mexico	6	–	2	9	–	4
Fresno State	5	–	3	9	–	4
Hawaii	5	–	3	9	–	4
Utah State	4	–	4	6	–	7
Air Force	3	–	5	4	–	8
Nevada	2	–	6	3	–	9
Wyoming	2	–	6	4	–	8
San Jose State	2	–	6	3	–	9
Colorado State	1	–	7	2	–	10
Championship: Boise State 38, UNLV 21
$ – Conference champion; y – Championship game participant; Rankings from CFP Rankings

The 2025 Fresno State Bulldogs football team represented California State University, Fresno as a member of the Mountain West Conference during the 2025 NCAA Division I FBS football season. The Bulldogs were led by head coach Matt Entz in his first season with the program. The Bulldogs played their home games at Valley Children's Stadium on the university's Fresno, California campus. The 2025 season was the Bulldogs' final season in the Mountain West Conference as Fresno State will move to the Pac-12 Conference in 2026.

== Offseason ==
=== Transfers ===
==== Outgoing ====
Player	Position	Destination
Tim Grear	WR	Akron
Jalen Moss	WR	Arizona State
Raylen Sharpe	WR	Arkansas
Phoenix Jackson	LB	Baylor
Malik Sherrod	RB	Boise State
Antoine Sullivan	WR	Cal Poly
Gavriel Lightfoot	DL	Colorado
Jack Jacobs	QB	East Texas A&M
Michael Eneh	IOL	Houston Christian
Joshua Wood	QB	Idaho
Chedon James	WR	Incarnate Word
Lyndon Ravare	WR	Kennesaw State
Jordan Pierro	CB	Louisiana Tech
Mikey Keene	QB	Michigan
Karim McCune II	WR	Northwood
Nathan Acevedo	WR	San Diego State
Julian Neal	DB	Stanford
Justin Houston	ATH	Utah Tech
Jacob Holmes	DL	Virginia
Charles Greer	RB	Unknown
Charlotin Charles	CB	Unknown
Ezra Christensen	DL	Unknown
Elijah Gilliam	RB	Withdrawn
Al'zillion Hamilton	DB	Withdrawn
Josiah Freeman	WR	Withdrawn
Kamron Beachem	TE	Withdrawn

==== Incoming ====
Player	Position	Previous school
Rayshon Luke	RB	Arizona
K'Vion Thunderbird	LB	Arizona State
Finn Claypool	DE	Drake
Steven Scott III	OT	Illinois
Kyson Van Vugt	OL	Iowa
Jahlil McClain	WR	Louisville
Ezekiel Avit	WR	Maryland
Martin Owusu	DL	Minnesota
Michael Jordan Jr.	DL	Northern Colorado
Ethan Tierney	S	Northern Illinois
Andre Cobb	DB	Northern Illinois
Bryson Harrington	DL	Pittsburgh
Luke Jones	WR	Purdue
E. J. Warner	QB	Rice
Carson Conklin	QB	Sacramento State
Marquise Thorpe-Taylor	IOL	UCLA
Gino Quinones	OL	USC
Sammie Hunter	CB	Utah
Simeon Harris	S	Utah State
Jadon Pearson	LB	Utah State
Josiah Ayon	WR	Western Colorado

=== Coaching staff additions ===
Name	New Position	Previous Team	Previous Position	Source
Matt Entz	Head coach	USC	Assistant head coach (defense)/Linebackers	
Josh Davis	Offensive coordinator	South Dakota	Offensive coordinator	
Nick Benedetto	Defensive coordinator	Northern Illinois	Defensive coordinator/Safeties	
Zach Crabtree	Offensive line	USC	Assistant offensive line	
Adam Breske	Linebackers	Northern Illinois	Linebackers/Special teams	
Brian Ferentz	Tight ends	Maryland	Senior offensive assistant	
Jordan Gigli	Defensive line	Northern Illinois	Defensive line	
Marcus Hall-Oliver	Edge	Stony Brook	Safeties	

== Preseason ==
=== Mountain West media poll ===
The Mountain West's preseason prediction poll was released on July 16, 2025. Fresno State was predicted to finish fifth.

== Schedule ==
Date	Time	Opponent	Site	TV	Result	Attendance
August 23	3:30 p.m.	at Kansas*	David Booth Kansas Memorial Stadium; Lawrence, KS	FOX	L 7–31	41,525
August 30	6:30 p.m.	Georgia Southern*	Valley Children's Stadium; Fresno, CA	FS1	W 42–14	36,801
September 6	12:30 p.m.	at Oregon State*	Reser Stadium; Corvallis, OR	The CW	W 36–27	28,068
September 13	7:00 p.m.	Southern*	Valley Children's Stadium; Fresno, CA	KGPE	W 56–7	37,210
September 20	8:59 p.m.	at Hawaii	Clarence T. C. Ching Athletics Complex; Honolulu, HI (rivalry)	Spectrum Sports	W 23–21	13,789
October 4	7:30 p.m.	Nevada	Valley Children's Stadium; Fresno, CA	CBSSN	W 20–17	40,005
October 10	6:00 p.m.	at Colorado State	Canvas Stadium; Fort Collins, CO	CBSSN	L 21–49	27,874
October 25	12:30 p.m.	San Diego State^{†}	Valley Children's Stadium; Fresno, CA (rivalry)	FS1	L 0–23	41,535
November 1	12:30 p.m.	at Boise State	Albertsons Stadium; Boise, ID (rivalry)	FS1	W 30–7	32,826
November 15	7:30 p.m.	Wyoming	Valley Children's Stadium; Fresno, CA	FS1	W 24–3	35,076
November 22	7:30 p.m.	Utah State	Valley Children's Stadium; Fresno, CA	CBSSN	L 17–28	37,551
November 29	7:30 p.m.	at San Jose State	CEFCU Stadium; San Jose, CA (Battle for the Valley)	FS1	W 41–14	14,194
December 27	1:30 p.m.	vs. Miami (OH)*	Casino Del Sol Stadium; Tucson, AZ (Arizona Bowl)	The CW	W 18–3	37,232
*Non-conference game; ^{†}Homecoming; All times are in Pacific time

== Game summaries ==
=== at Kansas ===
Fresno State Bulldogs (0–0) at Kansas Jayhawks (0–0) – Game summary

Quarter	1	2	3	4	Total
Bulldogs	7	0	0	0	7
Jayhawks	14	10	7	0	31

at David Booth Kansas Memorial Stadium • Lawrence, KS

- Date: August 23
- Game time: 3:30 p.m. PDT
- Game weather: Clear • Temperature: 82.9 °F (28.3 °C) • Wind: N 10 mph
- Game attendance: 41,525
- Referee: Nolan Dumas
- TV announcers (FOX): Tim Brando (play-by-play), Devin Gardner (analyst) and Josh Sims (sideline)

Game information

First quarter

- (11:06) KU – Cam Pickett 21-yard pass from Jalon Daniels, Laith Marjan kick (Drive: 9 plays, 86 yards, 3:49; Kansas 7–0)
- (7:25) FRES – Elijah Gilliam 3-yard run, Dylan Lynch kick (Drive: 7 plays, 75 yards, 3:46; Tied 7–7)
- (2:16) KU – Leshon Williams 19-yard run, Laith Marjan kick (Drive: 11 plays, 75 yards, 5:10; Kansas 14–7)

Second quarter

- (11:06) KU – Cam Pickett 13-yard pass from Jalon Daniels, Laith Marjan kick (Drive: 5 plays, 59 yards, 1:53; Kansas 21–7)
- (1:00) KU – Laith Marjan 47-yard field goal (Drive: 8 plays, 38 yards, 3:40; Kansas 24–7)

Third quarter

- (7:51) KU – Keaton Kubecka 12-yard pass from Jalon Daniels, Laith Marjan kick (Drive: 5 plays, 49 yards, 2:11; Kansas 31–7)

Fourth quarter

- No scoring plays.

Statistics	FRES	KU
First downs	13	22
Plays–yards	58–216	58–383
Rushes–yards	29–37	38–207
Passing yards	179	176
Passing: comp–att–int	18-29-2	18-20-0
Turnovers	3	0
Time of possession	26:52	33:08

Team	Category	Player	Statistics
Fresno State	Passing	E. J. Warner	18/29, 179 yards, 2 INT
Fresno State	Rushing	Bryson Donelson	11 carries, 34 yards
Fresno State	Receiving	Josiah Freeman	3 receptions, 43 yards
Kansas	Passing	Jalon Daniels	18/20, 176 yards, 3 TD
Kansas	Rushing	Daniel Hishaw Jr.	13 carries, 69 yards
Kansas	Receiving	Cam Pickett	6 receptions, 77 yards, 2 TD

=== Georgia Southern ===
Georgia Southern Eagles (0–0) at Fresno State Bulldogs (0–1) – Game summary

Quarter	1	2	3	4	Total
Eagles	7	7	0	0	14
Bulldogs	10	3	15	14	42

at Valley Children's Stadium • Fresno, CA

- Date: August 30
- Game time: 6:30 p.m. PDT
- Game weather: Sunny
- Game attendance: 36,801
- Referee: Christian Watson
- TV announcers (FS1): Dan Hellie (play-by-play) and Petros Papadakis (analyst)

Game information

First quarter

- (7:35) FRES – Dylan Lynch 36-yard field goal (Drive: 14 plays, 57 yards, 7:25; Fresno State 3–0)
- (4:52) FRES – Rayshon Luke 17-yard run, Dylan Lynch kick (Drive: 3 plays, 20 yards, 0:49; Fresno State 10–0)
- (1:17) GASO – Camden Brown 18-yard pass from JC French IV, Tripp Bryant kick (Drive: 8 plays, 75 yards, 3:35; Fresno State 10–7)

Second quarter

- (11:33) GASO – River Helms 4-yard pass from JC French IV, Tripp Bryant kick (Drive: 9 plays, 57 yards, 3:50; Georgia Southern 14–10)
- (0:00) FRES – Dylan Lynch 26-yard field goal (Drive: 9 plays, 45 yards, 4:02; Georgia Southern 14–13)

Third quarter

- (8:36) FRES – Bryson Donelson 6-yard run, Josiah Freeman two-point run (Drive: 8 plays, 55 yards, 4:24; Fresno State 21–14)
- (1:50) FRES – Rayshon Luke 12-yard run, Dylan Lynch kick (Drive: 9 plays, 56 yards, 4:47; Fresno State 28–14)

Fourth quarter

- (10:02) FRES – Brandon Ramirez 3-yard run, Dylan Lynch kick (Drive: 8 plays, 90 yards, 4:46; Fresno State 35–14)
- (6:21) FRES – Rayshon Luke 29-yard run, Dylan Lynch kick (Drive: 5 plays, 71 yards, 3:93; Fresno State 42–14)

Statistics	GASO	FRES
First downs	13	29
Plays–yards	49–242	72–527
Rushes–yards	21–84	45–351
Passing yards	158	176
Passing: Comp–Att–Int	17–28–1	20–27–2
Turnovers	1	3
Time of possession	21:59	38:01

Team	Category	Player	Statistics
Georgia Southern	Passing	JC French IV	17/28, 158 yards, 2 TD, INT
Georgia Southern	Rushing	OJ Arnold	9 carries, 41 yards
Georgia Southern	Receiving	Camden Brown	4 receptions 55 yards, TD
Fresno State	Passing	E. J. Warner	20/27, 176 yards, 2 INT
Fresno State	Rushing	Bryson Donelson	23 carries, 167 yards, TD
Fresno State	Receiving	Jayon Farrar	3 receptions, 33 yards

=== at Oregon State ===
Fresno State Bulldogs (1–1) at Oregon State Beavers (0–1) – Game summary

Quarter	1	2	3	4	Total
Bulldogs	7	13	0	16	36
Beavers	6	9	6	6	27

at Reser Stadium • Corvallis, OR

- Date: September 6
- Game time: 12:30 p.m. PDT
- Game attendance: 28,068
- Referee: John Love
- TV announcers (The CW): Ted Robinson (play-by-play), Ryan Leaf (analyst) and Nigel Burton (sideline)

Game information

First quarter

- (12:24) FRES – E. J. Warner 30-yard run, Dylan Lynch kick (Drive: 6 plays, 68 yards, 2:29; Fresno State 7–0)
- (7:24) ORST – Eddie Freauff 5-yard pass from Maalik Murphy, Two–point conversion failed (Drive: 11 plays, 75 yards, 5:00; Fresno State 7–6)

Second quarter

- (11:27) ORST – Malachi Durant 10-yard pass from Maalik Murphy, Two–point conversion failed (Drive: 7 plays, 79 yards, 3:19; Oregon State 12–7)
- (8:43) FRES – Rayshon Luke 44-yard run, Dylan Lynch kick (Drive: 5 plays, 72 yards, 2:38; Fresno State 14–12)
- (3:23) ORST – Caleb Ojeda 27-yard field goal (Drive: 11 plays, 60 yards, 5:12; Oregon State 15–14)
- (0:45) FRES – Jaden Carrillo 42-yard punt return, Two–point conversion failed (Fresno State 20–15)

Third quarter

- (3:44) ORST – Jake Reichie 4-yard pass from Maalik Murphy, Two–point conversion failed (Drive: 18 plays, 68 yards, 11:16; Oregon State 21–20)

Fourth quarter

- (13:57) FRES – Dylan Lynch 34-yard field goal (Drive: 9 plays, 50 yards, 4:47; Fresno State 23–21)
- (9:06) FRES – Dylan Lynch 28-yard field goal (Drive: 5 plays, 11 yards, 2:12; Fresno State 26–21)
- (1:19) ORST – David Wells Jr. 34-yard pass from Maalik Murphy, Two–point conversion failed (Drive: 6 plays, 68 yards, 0:49; Oregon State 27–26)
- (0:29) FRES – Dylan Lynch 28-yard field goal (Drive: 7 plays, 44 yards, 0:44; Fresno State 29–27)
- (0:04) FRES – Jaden Carrillo 45-yard punt return, Dylan Lynch kick (Fresno State 36–27)

Statistics	FRES	ORST
First downs	15	30
Plays–yards	46–318	83–528
Rushes–yards	28–197	34–140
Passing yards	121	388
Passing: Comp–Att–Int	13–18–1	32–49–2
Turnovers	1	2
Time of possession	22:35	37:35

Team	Category	Player	Statistics
Fresno State	Passing	E. J. Warner	13/18, 121 yards, INT
Fresno State	Rushing	Rayshon Luke	12 carries, 86 yards, 2 TD
Fresno State	Receiving	Josiah Freeman	5 receptions, 82 yards
Oregon State	Passing	Maalik Murphy	31/48, 371 yards, 4 TD, 2 INT
Oregon State	Rushing	Anthony Hankerson	25 carries, 136 yards
Oregon State	Receiving	Taz Reddicks	11 receptions, 158 yards

=== Southern (FCS) ===
Southern Jaguars (FCS) (1–2) at Fresno State Bulldogs (2–1) – Game summary

Quarter	1	2	3	4	Total
Jaguars (FCS)	0	7	0	0	7
Bulldogs	14	21	7	14	56

at Valley Children's Stadium • Fresno, CA

- Date: September 13
- Game time: 7:00 p.m. PDT
- Game weather: Sunny
- Game attendance: 37,210
- Referee: Brad Carrell
- TV announcers (KGPE/MW Network): Matt Norville (play-by-play), Cam Worrell (analyst) and Taylor Martinez (sideline)

Game information

First quarter

- (11:53) FRES – Harold Duvall 25-yard pass from E.J. Warner, Dylan Lynch kick (Drive: 6 plays, 65 yards, 3:07; Fresno State 7–0)
- (2:54) FRES – Jordan Brown 6-yard pass from E.J. Warner, Dylan Lynch kick (Drive: 11 plays, 45 yards, 6:06; Fresno State 14–0)

Second quarter

- (10:58) FRES – Rayshon Luke 19-yard pass from E.J. Warner, Dylan Lynch kick (Drive: 4 plays, 41 yards, 1:55; Fresno State 21–0)
- (5:41) SOU – Trey Holly 1-yard run, Nathan Zimmer kick (Drive: 9 plays, 85 yards, 5:28; Fresno State 21–7)
- (5:28) FRES – Bryson Donelson 57-yard run, Dylan Lynch kick (Drive: 1 play, 57 yards, 0:03; Fresno State 28–7)
- (0:21) FRES – Richie Anderson III 22-yard pass from E.J. Warner, Dylan Lynch kick (Drive: 8 plays, 66 yards, 0:11; Fresno State 35–7)

Third quarter

- (3:06) FRES – Rayshon Luke 19-yard run, Dylan Lynch kick (Drive: 7 plays, 44 yards, 2:47; Fresno State 42–7)

Fourth quarter

- (10:10) FRES – Jonathan Arceneaux 3-yard run, Dylan Lynch kick (Drive: 10 plays, 64 yards, 5:29; Fresno State 49–7)
- (5:42) FRES – Elijah Gilliam 5-yard run, Dylan Lynch kick (Drive: 8 plays, 54 yards, 3:16; Fresno State 56–7)

Statistics	SOU	FRES
First downs	7	31
Plays–yards	45–142	71–507
Rushes–yards	27–11	41–225
Passing yards	131	282
Passing: Comp–Att–Int	10–18–0	25–30–0
Turnovers	0	1
Time of possession	25:14	34:46

Team	Category	Player	Statistics
Southern	Passing	Ashton Strother	9/14, 127 yards
Southern	Rushing	Jason Gabriel	9 carries, 13 yards
Southern	Receiving	Malachi Jackson	2 receptions, 55 yards
Fresno State	Passing	E. J. Warner	20/24, 240 yards, 4 TD
Fresno State	Rushing	Bryson Donelson	9 carries, 90 yards, TD
Fresno State	Receiving	Rayshon Luke	7 receptions, 79 yards, TD

=== at Hawaii (rivalry) ===
Fresno State Bulldogs (3–1) at Hawaii Rainbow Warriors (3–1) – Game summary

Quarter	1	2	3	4	Total
Bulldogs	0	7	6	10	23
Rainbow Warriors	0	9	6	6	21

at Clarence T.C. Ching Athletics Complex • Honolulu, HI

- Date: September 20
- Game time: 9:00 p.m. PDT
- Game weather: Cloudy
- Game attendance: 13,789
- Referee: Gary Reed
- TV announcers (Spectrum Sports/MW Network app): Kanoa Leahey (play-by-play) and Rich Miano (analyst)

Game information

First quarter

- No scoring plays.

Second quarter

- (7:20) HAW – De'Jon Benton sacks E.J. Warner in endzone for a safety (Hawaii 2–0)
- (1:47) HAW – Jamih Otis 42-yard fumble return, Kansei Matsuzawa kick (Hawaii 9–0)
- (0:38) FRES – Richie Anderson III 13-yard pass from E.J. Warner, Dylan Lynch kick (Drive: 6 plays, 57 yards, 0:56; Hawaii 9–7)

Third quarter

- (7:31) HAW – Kansei Matsuzawa 40-yard field goal (Drive: 9 plays, 34 yards, 2:00; Hawaii 12–7)
- (5:47) FRES – Bryson Donelson 1-yard run, two-point conversion failed (Drive: 4 plays, 75 yards, 1:44; Fresno State 13–12)
- (3:15) HAW – Kansei Matsuzawa 52-yard field goal (Drive: 7 plays, 40 yards, 2:32; Hawaii 15–13)

Fourth quarter

- (9:54) FRES – Dylan Lynch 27-yard field goal (Drive: 4 plays, 3 yards, 1:28; Fresno State 16–15)
- (5:20) FRES – K'Vion Thunderbird 59-yard interception return, Dylan Lynch kick (Fresno State 23–15)
- (0:10) HAW – Blaze Kamoku 10-yard pass from Micah Alejado, two-point conversion failed (Drive: 12 plays, 77 yards, 2:56; Fresno State 23–21)

Statistics	FRES	HAW
First downs	16	19
Plays–yards	61–301	74–308
Rushes–yards	32–71	27–89
Passing yards	230	219
Passing: Comp–Att–Int	22–29–0	28–47–3
Turnovers	1	4
Time of possession	30:10	29:50

Team	Category	Player	Statistics
Fresno State	Passing	E.J. Warner	22/29, 230 yards, TD
Fresno State	Rushing	Rayshon Luke	10 carries, 39 yards
Fresno State	Receiving	Kamron Beachem	2 receptions, 84 yards
Hawaii	Passing	Micah Alejado	28/47, 219 yards, TD, 3 INT
Hawaii	Rushing	Micah Alejado	3 carries, 31 yards
Hawaii	Receiving	Pofele Ashlock	8 receptions, 68 yards

=== Nevada ===
Nevada Wolf Pack (1–3) at Fresno State Bulldogs (4–1) – Game summary

Quarter	1	2	3	4	Total
Wolf Pack	3	0	7	7	17
Bulldogs	0	20	0	0	20

at Valley Children's Stadium • Fresno, CA

- Date: October 4
- Game time: 7:30 p.m. PDT
- Game weather: Sunny
- Game attendance: 40,005
- Referee: Gary Reed
- TV announcers (CBSSN): Jason Knapp (play-by-play) and Taylor McHargue (analyst)

Game information

First quarter

- (1:59) NEV – Joe McFadden 29-yard field goal (Drive: 8 plays, 42 yards, 3:38; Nevada 3–0)

Second quarter

- (9:46) FRES – Dylan Lynch 21-yard field goal (Drive: 9 plays, 28 yards, 5:01; Tied 3–3)
- (8:25) FRES – Josiah Freeman 12-yard pass from EJ Warner, Dylan Lynch kick (Drive: 3 plays, 29 yards, 1:15; Fresno State 10–3)
- (3:19) FRES – Dylan Lynch 38-yard field goal (Drive: 5 plays, 71 yards, 3:03; Fresno State 13–3)
- (0:32) FRES – Josiah Freeman 24-yard pass from EJ Warner, Dylan Lynch kick (Drive: 6 plays, 66 yards, 1:01; Fresno State 20–3)

Third quarter

- (0:43) NEV – Dakota Thomas 15-yard pass from Carter Jones, Joe McFadden kick (Drive: 10 plays, 46 yards, 4:52; Fresno State 20–10)

Fourth quarter

- (12:36) NEV – Caleb Ramseur 17-yard pass from Carter Jones, Joe McFadden kick (Drive: 4 plays, 65 yards, 2:08; Fresno State 20–17)

Statistics	NEV	FRES
First downs	13	16
Plays–yards	55–246	62–342
Rushes–yards	34–129	36–152
Passing yards	117	190
Passing: Comp–Att–Int	12–21–3	18–26–1
Turnovers	4	1
Time of possession	27:11	32:49

Team	Category	Player	Statistics
Nevada	Passing	Carter Jones	11/15, 121 yards, 2 TD, INT
Nevada	Rushing	Caleb Ramseur	16 carries, 77 yards
Nevada	Receiving	Nate Burleson II	1 reception, 45 yards
Fresno State	Passing	E.J. Warner	18/26, 190 yards 2 TD, INT
Fresno State	Rushing	Rayshon Luke	9 carries, 83 yards
Fresno State	Receiving	Richie Anderson III	7 receptions, 67 yards

=== at Colorado State ===
Fresno State Bulldogs (5–1) at Colorado State Rams (1–4) – Game summary

Quarter	1	2	3	4	Total
Bulldogs	0	14	7	0	21
Rams	14	21	0	14	49

at Canvas Stadium • Fort Collins, CO

- Date: October 10
- Game time: 7:00 p.m. MDT
- Game weather: Cloudy
- Game attendance: 27,874
- Referee: Cal McNeill
- TV announcers (CBSSN): Chris Lewis (play-by-play) and Randy Cross (analyst)

Game information

First quarter

- (9:59) CSU – Justin Marshall 73-yard run, Isaiah Hankins kick (Drive: 3 plays, 86 yards, 1:23; Colorado State 7–0)
- (5:13) CSU – Javion Kinnard 29-yard pass from Jackson Brousseau, Isaiah Hankins kick (Drive: 5 plays, 53 yards, 1:17; Colorado State 14–0)

Second quarter

- (14:11) CSU – Rocky Beers 4-yard pass from Jackson Brousseau, Isaiah Hankins kick (Drive: 9 plays, 52 yards, 3:25; Colorado State 21–0)
- (11:42) FRES – Josiah Freeman 23-yard pass from E.J. Warner, Dylan Lynch kick (Drive: 5 plays, 76 yards, 2:21; Colorado State 21–7)
- (6:08) CSU – Rocky Beers 20-yard pass from Jackson Brousseau, Isaiah Hankins kick (Drive: 11 plays, 75 yards, 5:34; Colorado State 28–7)
- (5:58) CSU – Paul Tangelo 36-yard fumble return, Isaiah Hankins kick (Colorado State 35–7)
- (1:20) FRES – Josiah Freeman 26-yard pass from E.J. Warner, Dylan Lynch kick (Drive: 11 plays, 75 yards, 4:31; Colorado State 35–14)

Third quarter

- (5:51) FRES – Rayshon Luke 23-yard pass from E.J. Warner, Dylan Lynch kick (Drive: 9 plays, 73 yards, 3:35; Colorado State 35–21)

Fourth quarter

- (9:15) CSU – Lloyd Avant 12-yard run, Isaiah Hankins kick (Drive: 5 plays, 61 yards, 2:19; Colorado State 42–21)
- (1:12) CSU – Jalen Dupree 4-yard run, Isaiah Hankins kick (Drive: 2 plays, 7 yards, 0:48; Colorado State 49–21)

Statistics	FRES	CSU
First downs	28	15
Plays–yards	80–469	53–334
Rushes–yards	31–119	35–190
Passing yards	350	144
Passing: Comp–Att–Int	28–49–3	12–18–0
Turnovers	4	0
Time of possession	34:48	25:12

Team	Category	Player	Statistics
Fresno State	Passing	E.J. Warner	28/49, 350 yards, 3 TD, 3 INT
Fresno State	Rushing	Brandon Ramirez	7 carries, 41 yards
Fresno State	Receiving	Josiah Freeman	7 receptions, 89 yards, 2 TD
Colorado State	Passing	Jackson Brousseau	12/18, 144 yards, 3 TD
Colorado State	Rushing	Justin Marshall	7 carries, 93 yards, TD
Colorado State	Receiving	Javion Kinnard	3 receptions, 72 yards, TD

=== San Diego State (rivalry) ===
San Diego State Aztecs (5–1) at Fresno State Bulldogs (5–2) – Game summary

Quarter	1	2	3	4	Total
Aztecs	7	6	0	10	23
Bulldogs	0	0	0	0	0

at Valley Children's Stadium • Fresno, CA

- Date: October 25
- Game time: 12:30 p.m. PDT
- Game weather: Sunny, 70 °F (21 °C), wind SW 3 mph (4.8 km/h)
- Game attendance: 41,535
- Referee: Nolan Dumas
- TV announcers (FS1): Noah Reed (play-by-play) and Robert Smith (analyst)

Game information

First quarter

- (3:30) SDSU – Lucky Sutton 1-yard run, Gabriel Plascencia kick (Drive: 9 plays, 92 yards, 3:53; San Diego State 7–0)

Second quarter

- (12:20) SDSU – Gabe Plascencia 42-yard field goal (Drive: 10 plays, 52 yards, 5:07; San Diego State 10–0)
- (1:33) SDSU – Gabe Plascencia 50-yard field goal (Drive: 4 plays, 0 yards, 1:02; San Diego State 13–0)

Third quarter

- No scoring plays.

Fourth quarter

- (13:22) SDSU – Gabe Plascencia 27-yard field goal (Drive: 11 plays, 82 yards, 5:34; San Diego State 16–0)
- (13:22) SDSU – Tano Letuli 31-yard interception return, Gabe Plascencia kick (San Diego State 23–0)

Statistics	SDSU	FRES
First downs	21	14
Plays–yards	65–332	65–227
Rushes–yards	46–208	23–45
Passing yards	124	182
Passing: Comp–Att–Int	11–19–1	20–42–2
Turnovers	2	2
Time of possession	31:51	28:09

Team	Category	Player	Statistics
San Diego State	Passing	Jayden Denegal	11/19, 124 yards, INT
San Diego State	Rushing	Lucky Sutton	21 carries, 131 yards, TD
San Diego State	Receiving	Byron Cardwell Jr.	2 receptions, 59 yards
Fresno State	Passing	Carson Conklin	20/42, 182 yards, 2 INT
Fresno State	Rushing	Rayshon Luke	5 carries, 23 yards
Fresno State	Receiving	Rayshon Luke	5 receptions, 35 yards

=== at Boise State (rivalry) ===
Fresno State Bulldogs (5–3) at Boise State Broncos (6–2) – Game summary

Quarter	1	2	3	4	Total
Bulldogs	7	3	14	6	30
Broncos	0	7	0	0	7

at Albertsons Stadium • Boise, ID

- Date: November 1
- Game time: 12:30 p.m. PDT
- Game weather: Sunny
- Game attendance: 32,826
- Referee: Brad Carrell
- TV announcers (FS1): Noah Reed (play-by-play) and Robert Smith (analyst)

Game information

First quarter

- (2:28) FRES – Elijah Gilliam 1-yard run, Dylan Lynch kick (Drive: 9 plays, 55 yards, 4:16; Fresno State 7–0)

Second quarter

- (2:07) BOIS – Chase Penry 10-yard pass from Max Cutforth, Colton Boomer kick (Drive: 12 plays, 50 yards, 6:17; Tied 7–7)
- (0:05) FRES – Dylan Lynch 36-yard field goal (Drive: 6 plays, 28 yards, 1:23; Fresno State 10–7)

Third quarter

- (10:47) FRES – Brandon Ramirez 3-yard run, Dylan Lynch kick (Drive: 3 plays, 27 yards, 1:01; Fresno State 17–7)
- (4:30) FRES – Bryson Donelson 2-yard run, Dylan Lynch kick (Drive: 3 plays, 43 yards, 0:51; Fresno State 24–7)

Fourth quarter

- (10:35) FRES – Dylan Lynch 43-yard field goal (Drive: 15 plays, 50 yards, 8:08; Fresno State 27–7)
- (3:41) FRES – Dylan Lynch 33-yard field goal (Drive: 4 plays, 4 yards, 0:25; Fresno State 30–7)

Statistics	FRES	BOIS
First downs	15	11
Plays–yards	68–224	62–193
Rushes–yards	47–189	29–91
Passing yards	35	102
Passing: Comp–Att–Int	10–21–0	15–33–2
Turnovers	0	3
Time of possession	33:14	26:46

Team	Category	Player	Statistics
Fresno State	Passing	Carson Conklin	10/21, 35 yards
Fresno State	Rushing	Rayshon Luke	16 carries, 88 yards
Fresno State	Receiving	Josiah Freeman	5 receptions, 27 yards
Boise State	Passing	Max Cutforth	14/29, 106 yards, TD, 2 INT
Boise State	Rushing	Malik Sherrod	10 carries, 67 yards
Boise State	Receiving	Chase Penry	5 receptions, 44 yards, TD

=== Wyoming ===
Wyoming Cowboys (4–5) at Fresno State Bulldogs (6–3) – Game summary

Quarter	1	2	3	4	Total
Cowboys	3	0	0	0	3
Bulldogs	7	3	0	14	24

at Valley Children's Stadium • Fresno, CA

- Date: November 15
- Game time: 7:30 p.m. PDT
- Game weather: Rain
- Game attendance: 35,076
- Referee: Patrick Foy
- TV announcers (FS1): Trent Rush (play-by-play) and Petros Papadakis (analyst)

Game information

First quarter

- (9:34) FRES – Bryson Donelson 12-yard run, Dylan Lynch kick (Drive: 10 plays, 69 yards, 5:21; Fresno State 7–0)
- (6:39) WYO – Erik Sandvik 41-yard run field goal (Drive: 8 plays, 52 yards, 2:55; Fresno State 7–3)

Second quarter

- (0:26) FRES – Dylan Lynch 40-yard run field goal (Drive: 11 plays, 58 yards, 1:17; Fresno State 10–3)

Third quarter

- No scoring plays

Fourth quarter

- (12:58) FRES – Jonathan Arceneaux 58-yard run, Dylan Lynch kick (Drive: 1 play, 58 yards, 0:11; Fresno State 17–3)
- (2:00) FRES – Josiah Freeman 13-yard pass from Carson Conklin, Dylan Lynch kick (Drive: 4 plays, 24 yards, 1:02; Fresno State 24–3)

Statistics	WYO	FRES
First downs	9	23
Plays–yards	60–184	74–311
Rushes–yards	32–107	47–216
Passing yards	77	95
Passing: Comp–Att–Int	8–28–1	12–27–0
Turnovers	1	0
Time of possession	25:55	34:05

Team	Category	Player	Statistics
Wyoming	Passing	Kaden Anderson	6/23, 64 yards, INT
Wyoming	Rushing	Samuel Harris	12 carries, 102 yards
Wyoming	Receiving	Chris Durr Jr.	12 receptions, 37 yards
Fresno State	Passing	Carson Conklin	12/27, 95 yards, TD
Fresno State	Rushing	Rayshon Luke	12 carries 92 yards
Fresno State	Receiving	Josiah Freeman	2 receptions, 25 yards, TD

=== Utah State ===
Utah State Aggies (5–5) at Fresno State Bulldogs (7–3) – Game summary

Quarter	1	2	3	4	Total
Aggies	7	0	7	14	28
Bulldogs	7	10	0	0	17

at Valley Children's Stadium • Fresno, CA

- Date: November 22
- Game time: 7:30 p.m. PST
- Game weather: Clear
- Game attendance: 37,551
- Referee: Kenneth Ray
- TV announcers (CBSSN): Rich Waltz (play-by-play), Robert Turbin (analyst) and Brandon Baylor (sideline)

Game information

First quarter

- (7:05) FRES – Rayshon Luke 69-yard run, Dylan Lynch kick (Drive: 1 play, 69 yards, 0:12; Fresno State 7–0)
- (0:27) USU – Brady Boyd 24-yard pass from Anthony Garcia, Tanner Rinker kick (Drive: 3 plays, 40 yards, 0:20; Tied 7–7)

Second quarter

- (6:18) FRES – Dylan Lynch 30-yard field goal (Drive: 10 plays, 49 yards, 5:30; Fresno State 10–7)
- (0:39) FRES – Jahlil McClain 43-yard pass from E.J. Warner, Dylan Lynch kick (Drive: 7 plays, 73 yards, 1:11; Fresno State 17–7)

Third quarter

- (5:18) USU – Bryson Barnes 2-yard pass from Anthony Garcia, Tanner Rinker kick (Drive: 15 plays, 78 yards, 8:37; Fresno State 17–14)

Fourth quarter

- (10:37) USU – Javen Jacobs 19-yard run, Tanner Rinker kick (Drive: 13 plays, 80 yards, 4:38; Utah State 21–17)
- (6:05) USU – Javen Jacobs 32-yard run, Tanner Rinker kick (Drive: 6 plays, 75 yards, 3:04; Utah State 28–17)

Statistics	USU	FRES
First downs	27	12
Plays–yards	79–409	60–365
Rushes–yards	47–232	27–178
Passing yards	177	187
Passing: Comp–Att–Int	18–32–1	23–33–1
Turnovers	2	1
Time of possession	34:05	25:55

Team	Category	Player	Statistics
Utah State	Passing	Bryson Barnes	16/30. 150 yards, INT
Utah State	Rushing	Bryson Barnes	23 carries, 113 yards
Utah State	Receiving	Braden Pegan	8 receptions, 79 yards
Fresno State	Passing	E. J. Warner	23/33, 187 yards, TD, INT
Fresno State	Rushing	Rayshon Luke	4 carries, 81 yards, TD
Fresno State	Receiving	Jahlil McClain	2 receptions, 45 yards, TD

=== at San Jose State (Battle for the Valley) ===
Fresno State Bulldogs (7–4) at San Jose State Spartans (3–8) – Game summary

Quarter	1	2	3	4	Total
Bulldogs	3	18	3	17	41
Spartans	0	7	0	7	14

at CEFCU Stadium • San Jose, CA

- Date: November 29
- Game time: 7:30 p.m.
- Game weather: Clear • Temperature: 49 °F (9 °C) • Wind: N at 3 miles per hour (4.8 km/h)
- Game attendance: 14,194
- Referee: Cal McNeill
- TV announcers (FS1): Trent Rush (play-by-play) and Charles Arbuckle (analyst)

Game information

First quarter

- (6:16) FRES – Dylan Lynch 34-yard field goal (Drive: 7 plays, 19 yards, 3:47; Fresno State 3–0)

Second quarter

- (14:52) FRES – Dylan Lynch 41-yard field goal (Drive: 5 plays, 37 yards, 2:30; Fresno State 6–0)
- (11:44) FRES – Brandon Ramirez 2-yard run, Dylan Lynch kick (Drive: 5 plays, 37 yards, 2:30; Fresno State 13–0)
- (7:50) SJSU – Jordan Pollard 57-yard interception return, Dennis Lynch kick (Fresno State 13–7)
- (1:45) FRES – Josiah Freeman 37-yard pass from E.J. Warner, (Josiah Freeman run) (Drive: 9 plays, 38 yards, 4:16; Fresno State 21–0)

Third quarter

- (8:20) FRES – Dylan Lynch 41-yard field goal (Drive: 4 plays, 9 yards, 2:05; Fresno State 24–7)

Fourth quarter

- (10:59) SJSU – Viliami Teu 1-yard run, Dennis Lynch kick (Drive: 6 plays, 39 yards, 3:55; Fresno State 24–14)
- (6:57) FRES – Elijah Gilliam 2-yard run, Dylan Lynch kick (Drive: 7 plays, 75 yards, 4:02; Fresno State 31–14)
- (4:07) FRES – Dylan Lynch 33-yard field goal (Drive: 4 plays, 6 yards, 2:05; Fresno State 34–14)
- (1:52) FRES – Elijah Gilliam 34-yard run, Dylan Lynch kick (Drive: 4 plays, 41 yards, 2:09; Fresno State 41–14)

Statistics	FRES	SJSU
First downs	16	14
Plays–yards	73–397	60–227
Rushes–yards	53–259	26–113
Passing yards	138	114
Passing: Comp–Att–Int	15–20–1	11–34–5
Turnovers	3	5
Time of possession	39:07	20:53

Team	Category	Player	Statistics
Fresno State	Passing	E.J. Warner	15/20, 138 yards, TD, INT
Fresno State	Rushing	Elijah Gilliam	9 carries, 92 yards, 2 TD
Fresno State	Receiving	Josiah Freeman	6 receptions, 76 yards, TD
San Jose State	Passing	Xavier Ward	8/21, 94 yards, 3 INT
San Jose State	Rushing	Steve Chavez-Soto	9 carries, 50 yards
San Jose State	Receiving	Danny Scudero	4 receptions, 57 yards

=== vs. Miami (OH) (Arizona Bowl) ===
2025 Snoop Dogg Arizona Bowl
Miami RedHawks (7-6) vs. Fresno State Bulldogs (8-4) – Game summary

Quarter	1	2	3	4	Total
RedHawks	3	0	0	0	3
Bulldogs	0	9	0	9	18

at Casino Del Sol Stadium • Tucson, AZ

- Date: December 27
- Game time: 1:30 PM PST
- Referee: Rodney Burnette
- TV announcers (The CW): Thom Brennaman (play-by-play), Will Blackmon (analyst) and Wes Bryant (sideline)

Game information

First quarter

- (9:09) M-OH – Dom Dzioban 33-yard field goal (Drive: 9 plays, 45 yards, 3:40; Miami-Ohio 3–0)

Second quarter

- (7:54) FRES – Dylan Lynch 28-yard field goal (Drive: 15 plays, 82 yards, 8:00; Tied 3–3)
- (5:00) FRES – Dylan Lynch 23-yard field goal (Drive: 4 plays, 5 yards, 1:25; Fresno State 6–3)
- (0:00) FRES – Dylan Lynch 25-yard field goal (Drive: 6 plays, 71 yards, 1:09; Fresno State 9–3)

Third quarter

- No scoring plays.

Fourth quarter

- (11:12) FRES – Richie Anderson III 2-yard pass from E.J. Warner, (pass faield) (Drive: 13 plays, 70 yards, 6:23; Fresno State 15–3)
- (2:56) FRES – Dylan Lynch 37-yard field goal (Drive: 10 plays, 44 yards, 5:36; Fresno State 18–3)

Statistics	M-OH	FRES
First downs	12	18
Plays–yards	48–192	71–296
Rushes–yards	26–120	49–177
Passing yards	72	219
Passing: Comp–Att–Int	6–22–1	15–22–0
Turnovers	2	0
Time of possession	21:20	38:40

Team	Category	Player	Statistics
Miami (OH)	Passing	Thomas Gotkowski	6/22, 72 yards, INT
Miami (OH)	Rushing	Keith Reynolds	3 carries, 46 yards
Miami (OH)	Receiving	Cole Weaver	2 receptions, 43 yards
Fresno State	Passing	E.J. Warner	15/22, 219 yards, TD
Fresno State	Rushing	Brandon Ramirez	11 carries, 53 yards
Fresno State	Receiving	Josiah Freeman	7 receptions, 143 yards
