= Khristian Martin =

American football player (born 2006)

No. 3 – Fresno State Bulldogs
- Position: Quarterback
- Class: Sophomore

Personal information
- Born: 2006 (age 19–20)
- Listed height: 6 ft 4 in (1.93 m)
- Listed weight: 230 lb (104 kg)

Career information
- High school: Highland Springs (Highland Springs, Virginia)
- College: Maryland (2024–2025); Fresno State (2026–present)
- Stats at ESPN

Khristian Martin is an American college football quarterback for the Fresno State Bulldogs. He previously played for the Maryland Terrapins.

== Early life ==
Martin attended Highland Springs High School in Highland Springs, Virginia, where he played football and basketball. As a three-star recruit, Martin was rated as the 33rd overall prospect in the state of Virginia and ranked in the top 75 quarterbacks via 247Sports and he committed to play college football at the University of Maryland, College Park.

== College career ==
=== Maryland ===
On July 30, 2023, Martin committed to the Maryland Terrapins. In 2024, Martin redshirted. In his redshirt freshman season in 2025, Martin made his college debut against Florida Atlantic, where he completed 1 of 4 passing attempts for 10 yards. He appeared again against Towson on September 13, 2025, completing 5 passes out of 7 attempts for 15 yards. He finished the season with 11 passes out of 17 attempts for 105 yards and 1 touchdown. On December 16, 2025, Martin entered the transfer portal.

=== Fresno State ===
On January 9, 2026, Martin announced that he will be transferring to Fresno State. Entering the season, Martin was in a quarterback competition with Jayden Mandal and on August 31, 2026, it was announced that Martin will be the backup behind Mandal.

=== College statistics ===
Season	Team	Games			Passing								Rushing			
Season	Team	GP	GS	Record	Cmp	Att	Pct	Yds	Avg	TD	Int	Rtg	Att	Yds	Avg	TD
2024	Maryland	0	0	—	Redshirted (redshirt)											
2025	Maryland	5	0	—	11	17	64.7	105	6.2	1	0	136.0	4	8	2.0	0
2026	Fresno State	2	0	—	2	2	100.0	12	6.0	0	0	150.4	4	10	2.5	0
Career		7	0	0–0	13	19	68.4	117	6.2	1	0	137.5	8	18	2.3	0
