= E. J. Warner =

American football player (born 2003)

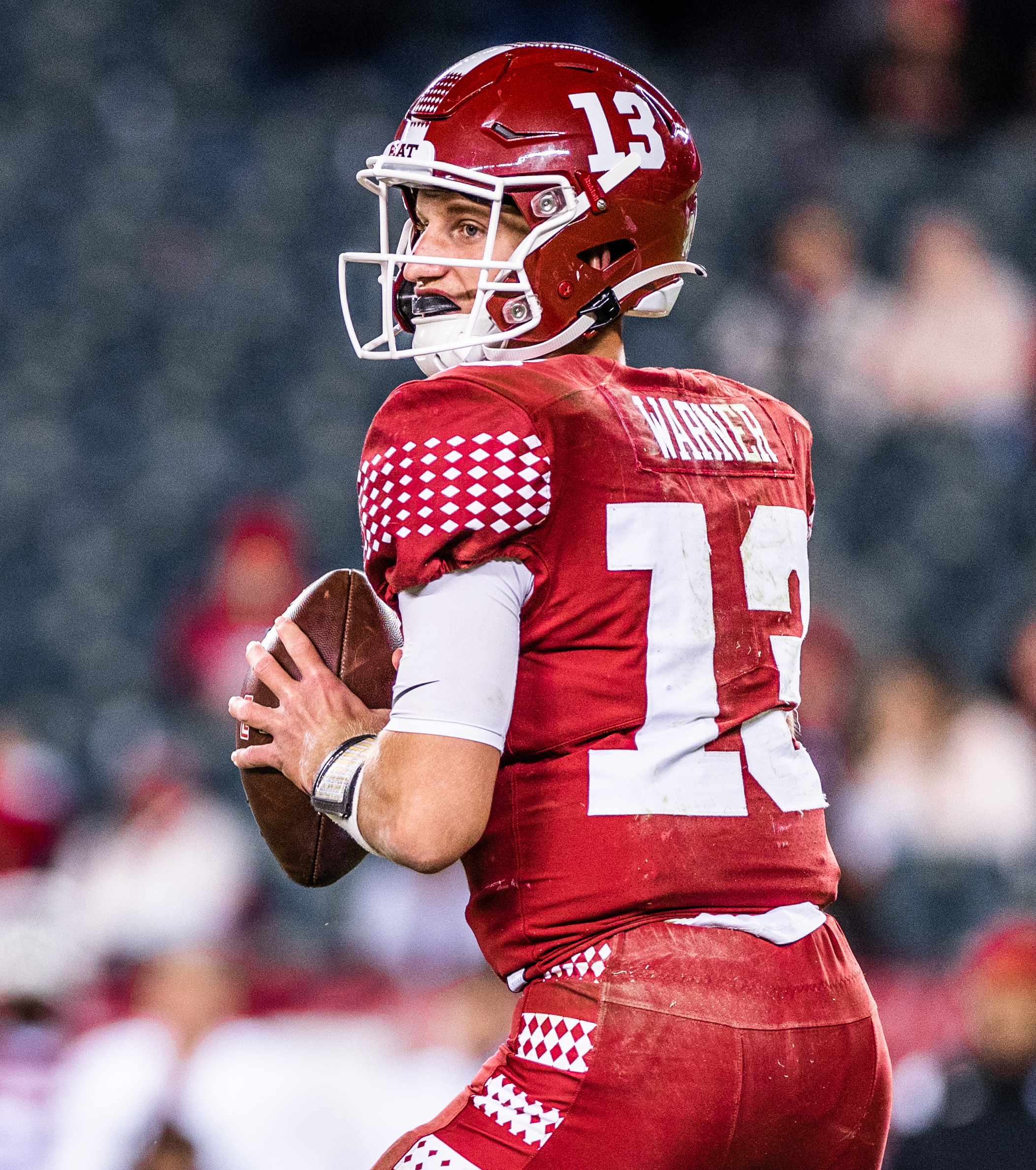
- Warner playing for Temple in 2022

No. 13 – St. Louis Battlehawks
- Position: Quarterback
- Roster status: Unsigned draft pick

Personal information
- Born: November 3, 2003 (age 23)
- Listed height: 5 ft 11 in (1.80 m)
- Listed weight: 213 lb (97 kg)

Career information
- High school: Brophy College Preparatory (Phoenix, Arizona)
- College: Temple (2022–2023); Rice (2024); Fresno State (2025)
- NFL draft: 2026: undrafted

Career history
- St. Louis Battlehawks (2027-present)

Awards and highlights
- AAC Rookie of the Year (2022)
- Stats at ESPN

Elijah "E. J." Warner (born November 3, 2003) is an American football quarterback for the St. Louis Battlehawks. He played college football for the Rice Owls, the Temple Owls, and the Fresno State Bulldogs. He is the son of Hall of Fame quarterback Kurt Warner.

== Early life ==
Warner grew up in Phoenix, Arizona, and initially attended Desert Mountain High School. He transferred to Brophy College Preparatory school after his freshman year. As a senior, Warner passed for 2,742 yards and 26 touchdowns. Warner committed to play college football at Temple over offers from Colorado State, Hawaii, Marshall, and UConn.

== College career ==
=== Temple ===
Warner began his freshman season at Temple as a backup. He made his collegiate debut on September 10, 2022, in relief of starter D'Wan Mathis against Lafayette and completed 14-of-19 pass attempts for 173 yards and two touchdowns in a 30–14 victory. Warner was named Temple's starting quarterback for the following week's game against Rutgers and passed for 215 yards with one touchdown and one interception in a 16–14 loss. He set school single-game records with 42 pass completions and 486 yards and had three touchdown passes on 59 attempts in a 43–36 loss to Houston on November 12, 2022. Warner broke both records in the final game of the season, completing 45-of-63 passes for 527 yards and five touchdowns as the Owls lost to East Carolina 49–46. He was named the American Athletic Conference (AAC) Rookie of the Year after finishing the season with 3,028 passing yards, the most by a freshman and the second most in a season in Temple history, and 18 touchdown passes. Warner entered the transfer portal on November 28, 2023.

=== Rice ===
On December 20, 2023, Warner announced that he would transfer to Rice.

On December 5, 2024, Warner announced that he would enter the transfer portal for the second time.

=== Fresno State ===
On January 10, 2025, Warner announced his commitment to play for Fresno State.

Warner served as Fresno State's starting quarterback in 10 games during the 2025 season, compiling a 7–3 record as the starter. He passed for 2,030 yards, completing 192 of 277 attempts (69.3%), with 13 touchdowns and 11 interceptions. His best single-game performance came at Colorado State on October 10, when he threw for a season-high 350 yards and three touchdowns. Warner was placed on the Johnny Unitas Golden Arm Award watch list during the season.

Fresno State finished the regular season 8–4 and qualified for the 2025 Arizona Bowl, where Warner was named the game's MVP after completing 15 of 22 passes for 219 yards and a touchdown in an 18–3 victory over Miami (Ohio). The win gave the Bulldogs a final record of 9–4 and made first-year head coach Matt Entz only the second Bulldog head coach to win a bowl game in his first season.

=== Statistics ===
Season	Team	Games			Passing								Rushing			
Season	Team	GP	GS	Record	Cmp	Att	Pct	Yds	Y/A	TD	Int	Rtg	Att	Yds	Avg	TD
2022	Temple	11	10	2–8	268	443	60.5	3,028	6.8	18	12	125.9	16	−50	−3.1	0
2023	Temple	10	10	3–7	256	445	57.5	3,076	6.9	23	12	127.3	24	7	0.3	0
2024	Rice	11	11	4–7	271	438	61.9	2,710	6.2	17	13	120.7	29	12	0.4	1
2025	Fresno State	10	10	7–3	192	277	69.3	2,030	7.3	13	11	138.4	51	126	2.5	1
Career		42	41	16–25	988	1,604	61.6	10,844	6.8	71	48	127.0	120	95	0.8	2

== Professional career ==
Pre-draft measurables
Height	Weight	Arm length	Hand span	Wingspan	40-yard dash	10-yard split	20-yard split	20-yard shuttle	Three-cone drill	Vertical jump	Broad jump
5 ft 11 1/2 in (1.82 m)	213 lb (97 kg)	30 1/8 in (0.77 m)	10 1/8 in (0.26 m)	6 ft 1 in (1.85 m)	4.83 s	1.63 s	2.73 s	4.56 s	7.40 s	30.5 in (0.77 m)	9 ft 0 in (2.74 m)
All values from Pro Day

In May 2026, he attended rookie minicamp for the Kansas City Chiefs and the Denver Broncos.

=== St. Louis Battlehawks ===
On November 19, 2026, Warner was selected by the St. Louis Battlehawks in the 2027 UFL Draft, ironically like his father, playing in a secondary league.

== Personal life ==
Warner is the son of Pro Football Hall of Fame quarterback Kurt Warner and brother of former professional wide receiver Kade Warner.
