= Matt Entz =

American football coach (born 1972)

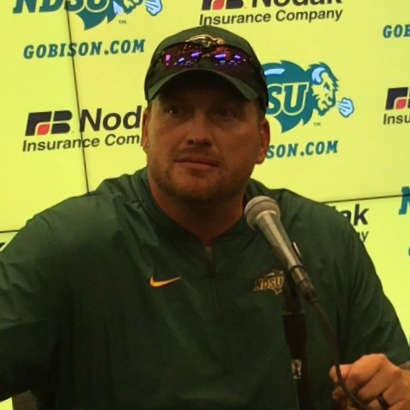
- Entz in 2019

Current position
- Title: Head coach
- Team: Fresno State
- Conference: Pac-12
- Record: 15–9

Biographical details
- Born: October 9, 1972 (age 54); Waterloo, Iowa, U.S.
- Education: Wartburg College (1995)

Coaching career (HC unless noted)
- 1998: Illinois College (DC)
- 1999–2001: Wayne State (NE) (AHC/LB)
- 2002–2009: Winona State (AHC/DC/LB)
- 2010–2011: Northern Iowa (DL)
- 2012: Northern Iowa (DC)
- 2013: Western Illinois (AHC/DC/DL)
- 2014–2018: North Dakota State (DC/LB)
- 2019–2023: North Dakota State
- 2024: USC (AHC/LB)
- 2025–present: Fresno State

Head coaching record
- Overall: 75–20
- Bowls: 1–0
- Tournaments: 15–3 (NCAA D-I playoffs)

Accomplishments and honors

Championships
- 2 NCAA Division I FCS (2019, 2021); 2 MVFC (2019, 2021)

Awards
- 2× MVFC Coach of the Year (2019, 2021); 2x AFCA FCS Coach of the Year (2019, 2021); 3× AFCA Region 4 Coach of the Year (2019–2021)

Matthew John Entz (born October 9, 1972) is an American college football coach who is the head football coach at California State University, Fresno (Fresno State), a position he has held since 2025. He also served as the head coach at North Dakota State University from 2019 to 2023. Entz took over from the departing Chris Klieman after Klieman led the 2018 North Dakota State Bison football team to the program's seventh NCAA Division I Football Championship in eight seasons. Entz was the defensive coordinator for the Bison from 2014 until his promotion following the 2018 season. He was the linebackers coach and assistant head coach for defense at the University of Southern California (USC) for the 2024 season.

== Early life ==
A native of Waterloo, Iowa, Entz attended Wartburg College, where he earned a bachelor's degree in biology in 1995 and a master's degree in education and exercise science from Wayne State College in Wayne, Nebraska in 1998.

== Coaching career ==
=== Early career ===
After graduating from Wartburg College, Entz began his coaching career as the defensive coordinator at Illinois College in 1998. He then joined Wayne State College as their assistant head coach and linebackers coach in 1999.

=== Winona State ===
In 2002, Entz was hired as the assistant head coach, defensive coordinator and linebackers coach at Winona State University under head coach Tom Sawyer.

=== Northern Iowa ===
In 2010, Entz was hired by the University of Northern Iowa as their defensive line coach under defensive coordinator Chris Klieman. In 2012, Entz was promoted to defensive coordinator.

=== Western Illinois ===
In 2013, Entz was hired as the assistant head coach, defensive coordinator and defensive line coach at Western Illinois University under head coach Bob Nielson.

=== North Dakota State ===
In 2014, Entz was hired as the defensive coordinator at North Dakota State University, reuniting with head coach Chris Klieman. He would hold this position for five seasons. In 2018, Entz was named as the 31st head coach at North Dakota State University, following Klieman's departure in to become head coach at Kansas State University. During his five-season tenure as head coach at North Dakota State, Entz led the football program to the playoffs in all five years, ending in two national championships, a runner-up finish, along with a semifinal and quarterfinal appearances. His overall record was 60–11 with a 15–3 playoff record.

=== USC ===
On December 10, 2023, Entz was named assistant head coach for defense and linebackers coach at the University of Southern California (USC) under head coach Lincoln Riley. He remained at NDSU for the remainder of the 2023 playoff run which ended the next Saturday at Montana in the FCS semifinals.

=== Fresno State ===
On December 4, 2024, Entz was named the 23rd head coach at California State University, Fresno (Fresno State).

== Personal life ==
Entz and his wife, Brenda, have two sons: Kellen and Konner. Entz is a Christian.

== Head coaching record ==
Year	Team	Overall	Conference	Standing	Bowl/playoffs	STATS^{#}	Coaches^{°}
North Dakota State Bison (Missouri Valley Football Conference) (2019–2023)
2019	North Dakota State	16–0	8–0	1st	W NCAA Division I Championship	1	1
2020–21	North Dakota State	7–3	5–2	4th	L NCAA Division I Quarterfinal	6	7
2021	North Dakota State	14–1	7–1	1st	W NCAA Division I Championship	1	1
2022	North Dakota State	12–3	7–1	2nd	L NCAA Division I Championship	2	2
2023	North Dakota State	11–4	5–3	T–3rd	L NCAA Division I Semifinal	3	3
North Dakota State:		60–11	32–7				
Fresno State Bulldogs (Mountain West Conference) (2025)
2025	Fresno State	9–4	5–3	T–5th	W Arizona		
Fresno State Bulldogs (Pac-12 Conference) (2026–present)
2026	Fresno State	6–5	3–4				
Fresno State:		15–9	8–7				
Total:		75–20					
National championship Conference title Conference division title or championship game berth
^{#}Rankings from final TSN/STATS Poll.
