= Will Blackmon =

American football player (born 1984)

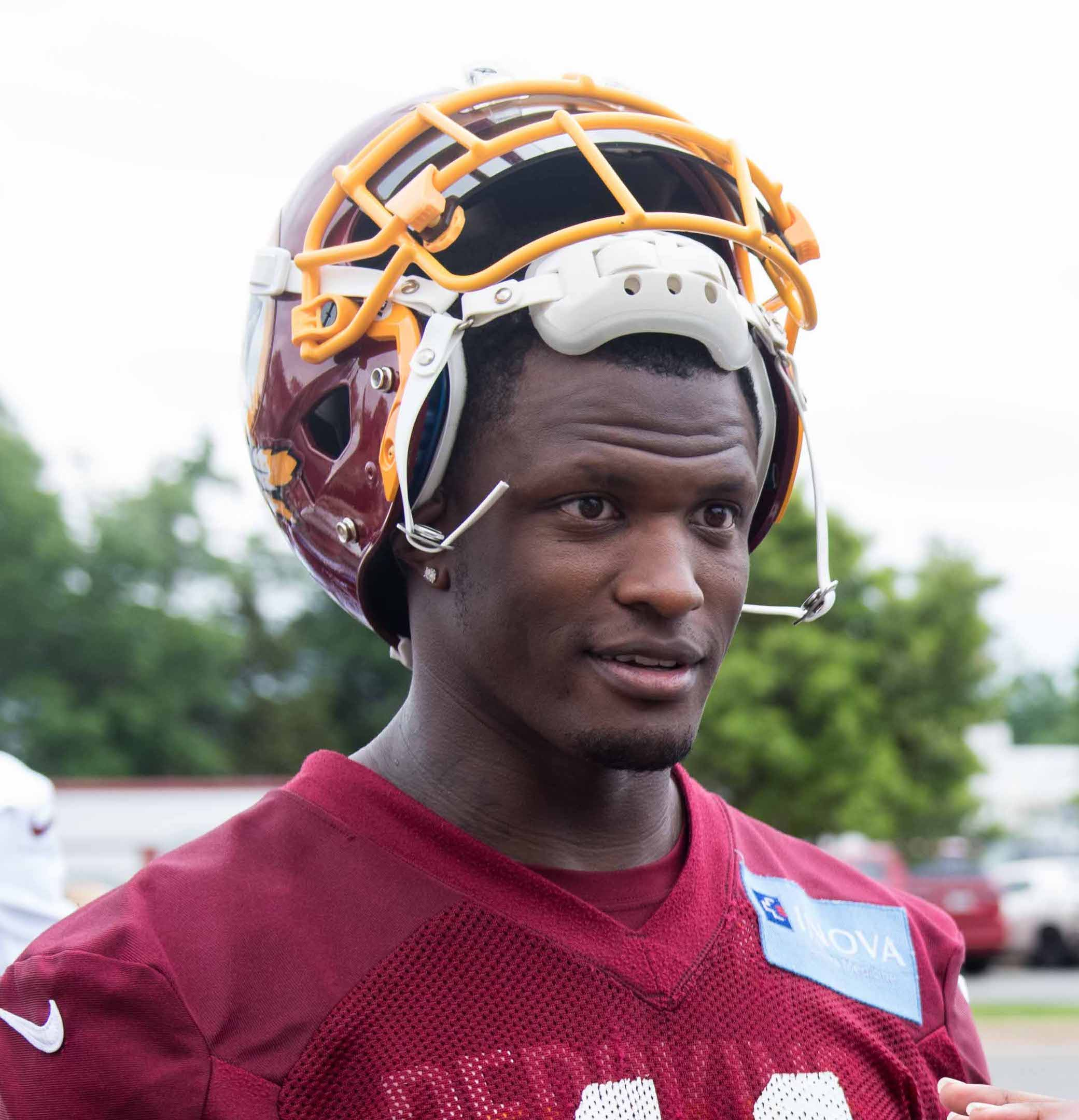
- Blackmon in 2017

No. 27, 30, 36, 24, 41
- Position: Safety

Personal information
- Born: October 27, 1984 (age 42); Providence, Rhode Island, U.S.
- Listed height: 6 ft 0 in (1.83 m)
- Listed weight: 212 lb (96 kg)

Career information
- High school: Hendricken (Warwick, Rhode Island)
- College: Boston College
- NFL draft: 2006: 4th round, 115th overall pick

Career history
- Green Bay Packers (2006–2009); New York Giants (2010–2011); Arizona Rattlers (2013)*; Seattle Seahawks (2013)*; Jacksonville Jaguars (2013–2014); Seattle Seahawks (2015)*; Washington Redskins (2015–2016); Saskatchewan Roughriders (2018)
- * Offseason or practice squad member only

Awards and highlights
- Super Bowl champion (XLVI); Second-team All-ACC (2005); 2× Second-team All-Big East (2003, 2004)

Career NFL statistics
- Total tackles: 210
- Sacks: 3.5
- Forced fumbles: 9
- Interceptions: 4
- Return yards: 2,435
- Total touchdowns: 5
- Stats at Pro Football Reference

William Edwards Blackmon (born October 27, 1984) is an American former professional football player who was a safety and return specialist in the National Football League (NFL) and Canadian Football League (CFL). He played college football for the Boston College Eagles, and was selected in the fourth round of the 2006 NFL draft by the Green Bay Packers. He was also a member of the New York Giants, Arizona Rattlers, Seattle Seahawks, Jacksonville Jaguars, Washington Redskins, and Saskatchewan Roughriders. He is currently an analyst for the Boston College football team.

== Early life ==
Blackmon was born in Providence, Rhode Island, but grew up in Cranston. He was raised by his father and grandmother after his mother died from Crohn's disease when he was 6 years old.

Blackmon attended Bishop Hendricken High School in Warwick, Rhode Island. At Hendricken, Blackmon earned 2001 All-America first-team honors from USA Today, ESPN.com, SuperPrep and PrepStar as a senior. He was named Gatorade Rhode Island Player of the Year after his senior season. Blackmon excelled in basketball and track; he won the 100-meter dash in the Rhode Island state meet with a time of 10.87 seconds.

== Professional career ==
Pre-draft measurables
Height	Weight	Arm length	Hand span	40-yard dash	10-yard split	20-yard split	20-yard shuttle	Three-cone drill	Vertical jump	Broad jump
6 ft 0 1/4 in (1.84 m)	198 lb (90 kg)	31 in (0.79 m)	9 1/8 in (0.23 m)	4.46 s	1.55 s	2.60 s	4.20 s	6.67 s	41.0 in (1.04 m)	11 ft 1 in (3.38 m)
All values from NFL Combine/Pro Day

=== Green Bay Packers ===
Blackmon had a 57-yard punt return touchdown and a fumble-return touchdown as the Green Bay Packers wrapped up the NFC North title with a 38–7 win on December 9, 2007, over the Oakland Raiders. They were the first and second touchdowns of his career. Blackmon became just the fourth player in NFL history to accomplish the feat of a kick and fumble return in the same game, and the first since 1974. In nine games, he recorded four solo tackles and a pass deflected.

In the first game of his 2008 season with the Packers, Blackmon returned a punt 76 yards for a touchdown against the Minnesota Vikings. He was later named NFC Special Teams Player of the Week for Week 1. In Week 10 against the Vikings, Blackmon returned a punt 65 yards for a touchdown.

Blackmon was released on an injury settlement from the Packers during 2010 roster cutdowns.

=== New York Giants ===
Blackmon signed with the New York Giants on October 29, 2010. After being placed on injured reserve, the Giants waived Blackmon on January 2, 2011. Then on November 23, after the Giants secondary got depleted with injuries, Blackmon re-signed with the team. He won a Super Bowl ring when the Giants defeated the New England Patriots in Super Bowl XLVI. He was released in the off-season and was signed by the Arizona Rattlers of the Arena Football League but never played for them.

=== Seattle Seahawks ===
On February 13, 2013, Blackmon signed with the Seattle Seahawks. He was released by the Seahawks on August 27.

=== Jacksonville Jaguars ===
On August 28, 2013, Blackmon was signed by the Jacksonville Jaguars. On November 10, in a game against the Tennessee Titans, he caused and recovered a Ryan Fitzpatrick fumble and returned it 21 yards for a touchdown, helping the Jaguars secure their first win of the season.

Blackmon was released by Jacksonville on February 26, 2015.

=== Seattle Seahawks (second stint) ===
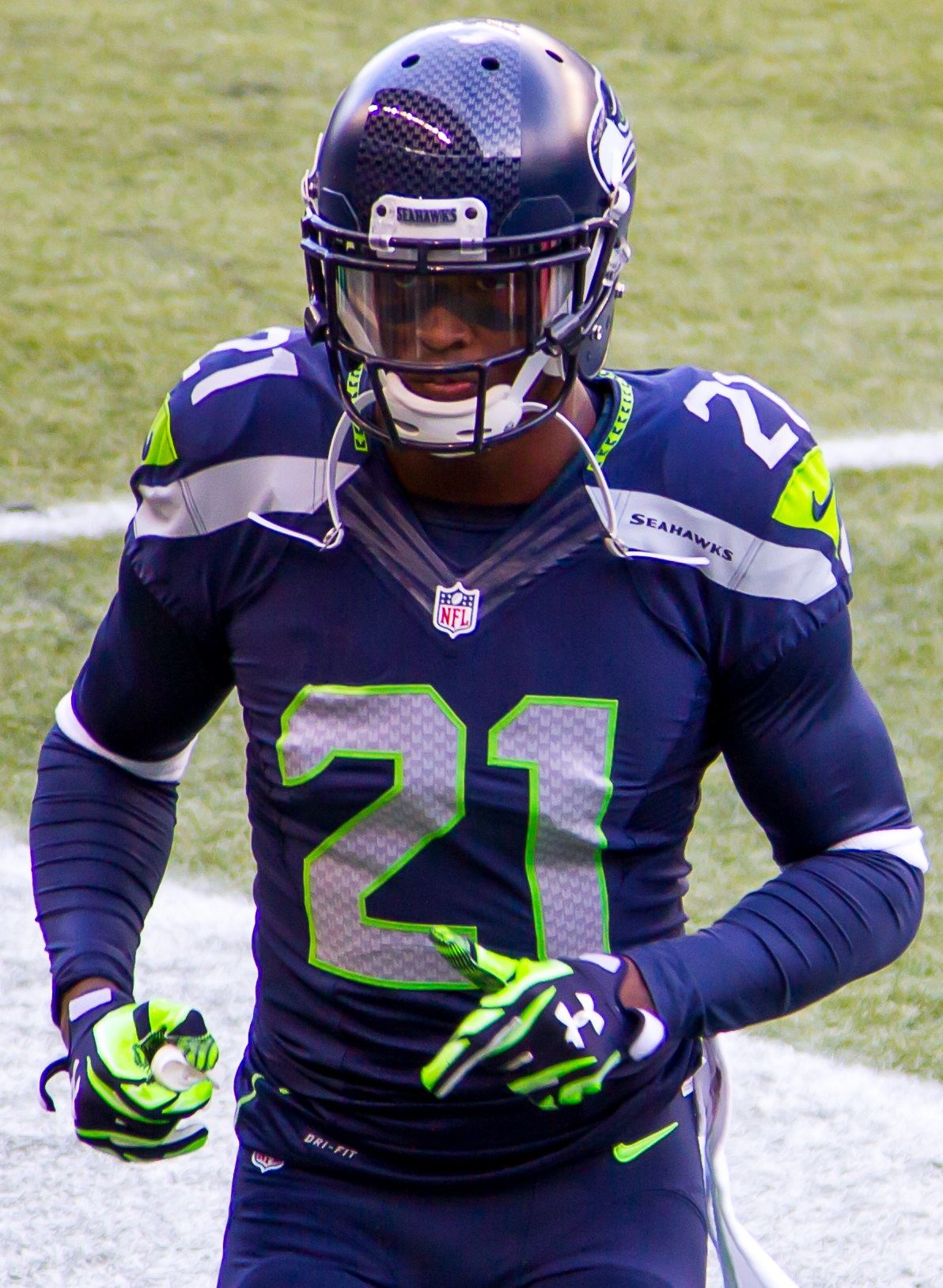
Blackmon with the Seattle Seahawks in the 2015 preseason

On March 9, 2015, Blackmon signed a contract to return to the Seattle Seahawks. He was released by Seattle as a part of final roster cuts on September 6.

=== Washington Redskins ===
Blackmon signed a one-year contract with the Washington Redskins on September 15, 2015. After testing the free agency market for the 2016 offseason, Blackmon re-signed with the Redskins on a two-year contract on March 14, 2016. Early in the 2016 offseason, the Redskins moved him from the cornerback position to free safety. He recorded his first interception of the season against Chicago Bears quarterback Matt Barkley in the team's Week 16 win.

On September 2, 2017, Blackmon was released by the Redskins.

=== Saskatchewan Roughriders ===
On July 24, 2018, Blackmon signed with the Saskatchewan Roughriders of the Canadian Football League. He was cut from the team's roster on July 30. Blackmon was then activated by the Roughriders and made his CFL debut as starting corner on September 2, in a win over the Winnipeg Blue Bombers, in which he recorded four tackles and forced one fumble. It was Blackmon's only game in the CFL; he retired shortly afterwards and accepted a job on NFL Network.

== NFL career statistics ==
Legend
	Led the league
**Bold**	Career high

=== Regular season ===
Year	Team	Games		Tackles					Interceptions					Fumbles			
Year	Team	GP	GS	Cmb	Solo	Ast	Sck	TFL	Int	Yds	TD	Lng	PD	FF	FR	Yds	TD
2006	GNB	4	0	1	1	0	0.0	0	0	0	0	0	0	0	0	0	0
2007	GNB	9	1	4	4	0	0.0	0	0	0	0	0	1	0	1	0	**1**
2008	GNB	16	1	35	30	5	0.0	0	0	0	0	0	0	2	**4**	0	0
2009	GNB	3	0	1	1	0	0.0	0	0	0	0	0	0	0	0	0	0
2010	NYG	5	0	2	1	1	0.0	0	0	0	0	0	0	0	0	0	0
2011	NYG	6	0	6	5	1	0.0	0	0	0	0	0	0	0	0	0	0
2013	JAX	15	8	41	31	10	**1.0**	**3**	1	1	0	1	**11**	2	1	**21**	**1**
2014	JAX	8	4	30	23	7	**1.0**	1	0	0	0	0	0	1	0	0	0
2015	WAS	15	10	**49**	**38**	11	**1.0**	0	**2**	7	0	6	8	**3**	2	0	0
2016	WAS	15	6	41	25	**16**	0.5	0	1	**79**	0	**79**	3	1	0	0	0
		96	30	210	159	51	3.5	4	4	87	0	79	23	9	8	21	2

=== Postseason ===
Year	Team	Games		Tackles					Interceptions					Fumbles			
Year	Team	GP	GS	Cmb	Solo	Ast	Sck	TFL	Int	Yds	TD	Lng	PD	FF	FR	Yds	TD
2011	NYG	4	0	3	3	0	0.0	0	0	0	0	0	0	0	0	0	0
2015	WAS	1	1	**8**	**6**	**2**	0.0	0	0	0	0	0	0	0	0	0	0
		5	1	11	9	2	0.0	0	0	0	0	0	0	0	0	0	0

== Post-playing career ==
He served as a studio analyst for Sky Sports UK telecasts for weeks 1 through 8 of the 2019 NFL season.
