= 2026 Washington State Cougars football team =

American college football season

2026 Washington State Cougars football
- Conference: Pac-12 Conference
- Record: 2–9 (1–6 Pac-12)
- Head coach: Kirby Moore (1st season)
- Offensive coordinator: Matt Miller (1st season)
- Offensive scheme: Pro spread
- Defensive coordinator: Trent Bray (1st season)
- Base defense: 4–2–5
- Home stadium: Martin Stadium

2026 Pac-12 Conference football standings
	Conf.			Overall
Team	W		L	W		L
No. 17 Boise State y	6	–	1	9	–	2
San Diego State y	5	–	2	6	–	5
Texas State	5	–	2	7	–	4
Oregon State	4	–	3	6	–	5
Utah State	3	–	4	4	–	7
Fresno State	3	–	4	6	–	5
Washington State	1	–	6	2	–	9
Colorado State	1	–	6	3	–	8
Championship: San Diego State at Boise State
y – Championship game participant; As of November 22, 2026; Rankings from CFP rankings

The 2026 Washington State Cougars football team represents Washington State University as a member of the Pac-12 Conference during the 2026 NCAA Division I FBS football season. Led by first-year head coach Kirby Moore, the Cougars play their home games on campus at Martin Stadium in Pullman, Washington.

Raised in Prosser and hired in December 2025, Moore was previously the offensive coordinator at Missouri of the Southeastern Conference (SEC).

== Offseason ==
=== Transfers ===
==== Outgoing ====
Player	Position	Destination
Ryan Harris	K	Arizona
Jovan Clark	LB	Ball State
Anthony Palano	LB	Boston College
Landon Wright	WR	Boston College
Luke Leighton	TE	Cal Poly
Kenny Worthy	S	Cincinnati
Dalton Anderson	QB	College of the Sequoias
Connor Sullivan	DL	Illinois
Trevor Bindel	IOL	Iowa State
Max Baloun	DL	Iowa State
Tyrone Cotton	CB	Iowa State
Donovan Fitzmaurice	DL	Iowa State
Duhron Goodman	S	Iowa State
Jack Janikowski	EDGE	Iowa State
Bryson Lamb	DL	Iowa State
Adlai Lounsbury	P	Iowa State
Brody Miller	S	Iowa State
Carter Pabst	WR	Iowa State
Damarius Russell	S	Iowa State
Sullivan Schlimgen	LB	Iowa State
Trillion Sorrell	CB	Iowa State
Malaki Ta'ase	DL	Iowa State
Isaac Terrell	EDGE	Iowa State
Dylan Paine	RB	Montana
Devin Ellison	WR	New Mexico State
Cameron Weir	WR	North Dakota
Jesiah Cornwell	TE	Northern Colorado
Mackenzie Alleyne	WR	Oklahoma
Jaxon Potter	QB	Old Dominion
Ajani Sheppard	QB	Temple
Darrion Dalton	DL	Unknown
AJ Davis	CB	Unknown
Tyson Durant	S	Unknown
Kamani Jackson	S	Unknown
Titus Miller	DL	Unknown
Travon Pankey	RB	Unknown
Troy Petz	P	Unknown
Mike Sandjo-Nijiki	DL	Unknown
Leo Pulalasi	RB	Withdrawn

==== Incoming ====
Player	Position	Previous school
Jshawn Frausto-Ramos	DB	Arizona
Edukwa Okundaye	DE	Arizona
Jack Bal	S	Arizona State
Jeremiah Bernard	S	Cal Poly
CJ Solis-Lumar	CB	Cal Poly
Ike Okafor	DL	California
Beau Phillips	RB	Central Washington
Jirah Leaupepetele	DL	Eastern Washington
Tank Hawkins	WR	Florida
Matyus McLain	EDGE	Idaho
Nylan Brown	LB	Kent State
Paul Hutson III	DL	Marshall
Daniel Blood	WR	Missouri
Sione Pasi	DL	Montana Western
Max Dean	P	New Mexico State
Darrius Clemons	WR	Oregon State
Jalil Tucker	CB	Oregon State
Balaam Miller	DL	Saint Francis (PA)
Jaylen Thomas	CB	San Jose State
Damarjhe Lewis	DL	SMU
DJ Warner	EDGE	SMU
Khamari Terrell	CB	Texas State
Caden Pinnick	QB	UC Davis
Jack Pedersen	TE	UCLA
Kalolo Ta'aga	OT	Utah
Linus Zunk	DL	Vanderbilt
Maximus McGree	OT	Washington
Jordan Dees	WR	West Georgia

=== Coaching staff additions ===
Name	New Position	Previous Team	Previous Position	Source
Kirby Moore	Head coach	Missouri	Offensive coordinator	
Matt Miller	Offensive coordinator	Boise State	Co-offensive coordinator/Wide receivers	
Trent Bray	Defensive coordinator	Oregon State	Head coach	
Justin Green	Running backs	Montana	Running backs	

== Schedule ==
Date	Time	Opponent	Site	TV	Result	Attendance
September 6	1:00 p.m.	at No. 17 Washington*	Husky Stadium; Seattle, WA (Apple Cup)	NBC	L 10–24	71,056
September 12	9:00 a.m.	at Kansas State*	Bill Snyder Family Football Stadium; Manhattan, KS	TNT	L 7–34	51,759
September 19	12:30 p.m.	Duquesne*	Martin Stadium; Pullman, WA	USA	W 48–7	28,288
September 26	4:30 p.m.	Arizona*	Martin Stadium; Pullman, WA	CBS	L 24–34	23,903
October 3	6:30 p.m.	Fresno State	Martin Stadium; Pullman, WA	USA	L 6–26	26,471
October 9	6:00 p.m.	at Utah State	Maverik Stadium; Logan, UT	The CW	L 16–17	20,806
October 17	3:00 p.m.	at Oregon State	Reser Stadium; Corvallis, OR	USA	L 30–48	39,257
October 24	3:00 p.m.	No. 21 Boise State	Martin Stadium; Pullman, WA	USA	L 10–31	27,330
October 31	4:00 p.m.	at San Diego State	Snapdragon Stadium; San Diego, CA	CBSSN	L 20–26	19,184
November 14	7:30 p.m.	Colorado State	Martin Stadium; Pullman, WA	CBSSN	W 73–7	19,117
November 21	3:00 p.m.	at Texas State	UFCU Stadium; San Marcos, TX	USA	L 14–42	23,627
November 28		Pac-12 opponent TBA (Note: In the 2026 season, the Pac-12 will use a "flex" scheduling model for Week 13. After the round-robin conference schedule, the conference will determine the pairings for Week 13. "Flex" games will not count in the conference standings.)*	Martin Stadium; Pullman, WA			
*Non-conference game; Rankings from AP Poll (and CFP Rankings, after November 3) – Released prior to game; All times are in Pacific time

== Game summaries ==
=== at No. 17 Washington (Apple Cup) ===
Washington State Cougars (0–0) at No. 17 Washington Huskies (0–0) – Game summary

Quarter	1	2	3	4	Total
Cougars	0	0	0	10	10
No. 17 Huskies	3	7	0	14	24

at Husky Stadium • Seattle, Washington

- Date: September 6
- Game time: 1:00 PM
- Game weather: Sunny • Temperature: 71 °F (22 °C)
- Game attendance: 71,056
- Referee: John Love
- TV announcers (NBC): Paul Burmeister, Yogi Roth and Zora Stephenson

Game information

First quarter

- WASH - Tyler Robles 48-yard field goal, 3:53. Huskies 3-0. Drive: 11 plays, 26 yards, 5:08.

Second quarter

- WASH - Demond Williams Jr. 5-yard rush (Tyler Robles kick), 10:09. Huskies 10-0. Drive: 5 plays, 21 yards, 2:18.

Third quarter

- No scoring plays.

Fourth quarter

- WSU - Caden Pinnick 11-yard rush (Jack Stevens kick), 10:15. Huskies 10-7. Drive: 9 plays, 62 yards, 5:16.
- WASH - Rashid Williams 1-yard pass from Demond Williams Jr. (Tyler Robles kick), 8:05. Huskies 17-7. Drive: 4 plays, 75 yards, 2:10.
- WSU - Jack Stevens 42-yard field goal, 4:30. Huskies 17-10. Drive: 8 plays, 46 yards, 3:35.
- WASH - Jayden Limar 11-yard run (Tyler Robles kick), 2:18. Huskies 24-10. Drive: 5 plays, 68 yards, 2:03.

Statistics	WSU	WASH
First downs	18	20
Plays–yards	56–242	64–402
Rushes–yards	31–100	29–134
Passing yards	142	268
Passing: comp–att–int	16–25–2	24–35–0
Turnovers	3	0
Time of possession	30:44	29:16

Team	Category	Player	Statistics
Washington State	Passing	Caden Pinnick	16/25, 142 yards
Washington State	Rushing	Caden Pinnick	14 carries, 61 yards, TD
Washington State	Receiving	Daniel Blood	5 receptions, 57 yards
Washington	Passing	Demond Williams Jr.	24/25, 268 yards, TD
Washington	Rushing	Demond Williams Jr.	7 carries, 61 yards, TD
Washington	Receiving	Chris Lawson	4 receptions, 87 yards

=== at Kansas State ===
Washington State Cougars (0–1) at Kansas State Wildcats (1–0) – Game summary

Quarter	1	2	3	4	Total
Cougars	0	7	0	0	7
Wildcats	3	14	10	7	34

at Bill Snyder Family Football Stadium • Manhattan, Kansas

- Date: September 12
- Game time: 9:00 AM
- Game weather: Cloudy • Temperature: 74 °F (23 °C) • Wind: NE 8 mph
- Game attendance: 51,759
- Referee: Preston Clipper
- TV announcers (TNT): J.B. Long, Mike Golic Jr. and Jared Greenberg

Game information

First quarter

- KSU - Luis Rodriguez 31-yard field goal, 6:00. Wildcats 3-0. Drive: 18 plays, 69 yards, 8:56.

Second quarter

- KSU - Josh Manning 6-yard pass from Avery Johnson (Luis Rodriguez kick), 4:23. Wildcats 10-0. Drive: 10 plays, 64 yards, 5:10.
- KSU - Joe Jackson 21-yard pass from Avery Johnson (Luis Rodriguez kick), 1:51. Wildcats 17-0. Drive: 2 plays, 20 yards, 0:18.
- WSU - Jaylen Thomas 47-yard interception return (Jack Stevens kick), 0:10. Wildcats 17-7. Drive: 5 plays, 38 yards, 0:37.

Third quarter

- KSU - Rodney Fields Jr. 75-yard rush (Luis Rodriguez kick), 13:54. Wildcats 24-7. Drive: 1 play, 75 yards, 0:12.
- KSU - Luis Rodriguez 31-yard field goal, 10:21. Wildcats 27-7. Drive: 5 plays, 42 yards, 1:59.

Fourth quarter

- KSU - Brandon White 9-yard pass from Avery Johnson (Luis Rodriguez kick), 13:52. Wildcats 34-7. Drive: 7 plays, 70 yards, 3:00.

Statistics	WSU	KSU
First downs	10	24
Plays–yards	50–166	74–487
Rushes–yards	30–101	40–295
Passing yards	65	192
Passing: comp–att–int	9–20–0	22–34–2
Turnovers	1	2
Time of possession	25:40	34:20

Team	Category	Player	Statistics
Washington State	Passing	Caden Pinnick	9/20, 65 yards
Washington State	Rushing	Kirby Voorhees	11 carries, 45 yards
Washington State	Receiving	Darrius Clemons	3 receptions, 27 yards
Kansas State	Passing	Avery Johnson	22/34, 192 yards, 3 TD, 2 INT
Kansas State	Rushing	Rodney Fields Jr.	13 carries, 105 yards, TD
Kansas State	Receiving	Josh Manning	10 receptions, 97 yards, TD

=== Duquesne (FCS) ===
Duquesne Dukes (FCS) (0–2) at Washington State Cougars (0–2) – Game summary

Quarter	1	2	3	4	Total
Dukes (FCS)	7	0	0	0	7
Cougars	7	7	21	13	48

at Martin Stadium • Pullman, Washington

- Date: September 19
- Game time: 12:30 PM
- Game weather: Sunny • Temperature: 70 °F (21 °C)
- Game attendance: 28,288
- Referee: Dwayne Johnson
- TV announcers (USA): Guy Haberman, Alex Brink and Kate Harrison

Game information

First quarter

- WSU - Kirby Vorhees 8-yard run (Jack Stevens kick), 8:10. Cougars 7-0. Drive: 5 plays, 72 yards, 1:48.
- DUQ - Carson Camp 1-yard run (Matt Clark kick), 4:16. Tied 7-7. Drive: 8 plays, 75 yards, 3:54.

Second quarter

- WSU - Caden Pinnick 19-yard run (Jack Stevens kick), 4:30. Cougars 14-7. Drive: 6 plays, 43 yards, 3:00.

Third quarter

- WSU - Jack Pedersen 11-yard pass from Caden Pinnick (Jack Stevens kick), 12:01. Cougars 21-7. Drive: 6 plays, 75 yards, 2:59.
- WSU - Branden Ganashamoorthy 10-yard pass from Caden Pinnick (Jack Stevens kick), 2:27. Cougars 28-7. Drive: 10 plays, 88 yards, 5:46.
- WSU - Kirby Vorhees 58-yard run (Jack Stevens kick), 0:00. Cougars 35-7. Drive: 2 plays, 65 yards, 0:35.

Fourth quarter

- WSU - Jaylen Thomas 47-yard punt return (Jack Stevens PAT failed), 5:32. Cougars 41-7. Drive: 3 plays, 7 yards, 1:36.
- WSU - Tank Hawkins Jr. 65-yard punt return (Jack Stevens kick), 3:05. Cougars 48-7. Drive: 3 plays, 2 yards, 2:27.

Statistics	DUQ	WSU
First downs	10	26
Plays–yards	53–180	62–512
Rushes–yards	33–105	40–316
Passing yards	75	196
Passing: comp–att–int	10–20–0	17–22–1
Turnovers	0	1
Time of possession	31:44	28:16

Team	Category	Player	Statistics
Duquesne	Passing	Carson Camp	9/18, 69 yards
Duquesne	Rushing	Dazhaun Hopkins	7 carries, 60 yards
Duquesne	Receiving	Ryan Petras	4 receptions, 56 yards
Washington State	Passing	Caden Pinnick	17/22, 196 yards, 2 TD, INT
Washington State	Rushing	Maxwell Woods	11 carries, 116 yards
Washington State	Receiving	Branden Ganashamoorthy	4 receptions, 67 yards, TD

=== Arizona ===
Arizona Wildcats (2–1) at Washington State Cougars (1–2) – Game summary

Quarter	1	2	3	4	Total
Wildcats	7	7	7	13	34
Cougars	14	3	0	7	24

at Martin Stadium • Pullman, Washington

- Date: September 26
- Game time: 4:30 PM
- Game weather: Sunny • Temperature: 60 °F (16 °C)
- Game attendance: 23,903
- Referee: Chris Wiggins
- TV announcers (CBS): Rich Waltz, Adam Breneman, Brian Kelly and Jordan Giorgio

Game information

First quarter

- WSU - Caden Pinnick 11-yard run (Jack Stevens kick), 9:57. Cougars 7-0. Drive: 10 plays, 71 yards, 3:28.
- WSU - Jackquintin Bal 25-yard interception return (Jack Stevens kick), 2:05. Cougars 14-0. Drive: 4 plays, 14 yards, 0:52.
- ARIZ - Tre Spivey 28-yard pass from Noah Fifita (Michael Salgado-Medina kick), 0:08. Cougars 14-7. Drive: 5 plays, 75 yards, 1:57.

Second quarter

- ARIZ - Tre Spivey 4-yard pass from Noah Fifita (Michael Salgado-Medina kick), 7:42. Tied 14-14. Drive: 13 plays, 78 yards, 6:20.
- WSU - Jack Stevens 33-yard field goal, 0:22. Cougars 17-14. Drive: 8 plays, 52 yards, 1:31.

Third quarter

- ARIZ - Caleb Smith 38-yard pass from Noah Fifita (Michael Salgado-Medina kick), 4:02. Wildcats 21-17. Drive: 3 plays, 82 yards, 0:42.

Fourth quarter

- ARIZ - Michael Salgado-Medina 27-yard field goal, 12:49. Wildcats 24-17. Drive: 11 plays, 70 yards, 3:27.
- ARIZ - Isaiah Mizell 11-yard pass from Noah Fifita (Michael Salgado-Medina kick), 9:07. Wildcats 31-17. Drive: 7 plays, 69 yards, 3:08.
- WSU - Branden Ganashamoorthy 46-yard pass from Caden Pinnick (Jack Stevens kick), 7:15. Wildcats 31-24. Drive: 6 plays, 75 yards, 1:52.
- ARIZ - Michael Salgado-Medina 51-yard field goal, 1:57. Wildcats 34-24. Drive: 11 plays, 41 yards, 5:18.

Statistics	ARIZ	WSU
First downs	24	23
Plays–yards	74-447	71-335
Rushes–yards	38-150	30-94
Passing yards	297	241
Passing: comp–att–int	22-36-1	24-41-1
Time of possession	34:02	25:58

Team	Category	Player	Statistics
Arizona	Passing	Noah Fifita	22/36, 297 yards, 4 TD, INT
Arizona	Rushing	Ismail Mahdi	10 carries, 63 yards
Arizona	Receiving	Tre Spivey	7 receptions, 129 yards, 2 TD
Washington State	Passing	Caden Pinnick	24/41, 241 yards, TD, INT
Washington State	Rushing	Kirby Vorhees	9 carries, 39 yards
Washington State	Receiving	Branden Ganashamoorthy	4 receptions, 67 yards, TD

=== Fresno State ===
Fresno State Bulldogs (3–1) at Washington State Cougars (1–3) – Game summary

Quarter	1	2	3	4	Total
Bulldogs	3	3	7	13	26
Cougars	0	6	0	0	6

at Martin Stadium • Pullman, Washington

- Date: October 3
- Game time: 6:30 PM
- Game weather: Sunny • Temperature: 70 °F (21 °C) • Wind: W 3 mph
- Game attendance: 26,471
- Referee: Chris Snead
- TV announcers (USA): Nate Gatter, Ryan Leaf and Lauren Green

Game information

First quarter

- FRES - Manaki Watanabe 27-yard field goal, 7:01. Bulldogs 3-0. Drive: 11 plays, 72 yards, 5:36.

Second quarter

- WSU - Jack Stevens 32-yard field goal, 9:27. Tied 3-3. Drive: 7 plays, 36 yards, 3:07.
- FRES - Manaki Watanabe 22-yard field goal, 6:06. Bulldogs 6-3. Drive: 9 plays, 71 yards, 3:21.
- WSU - Jack Stevens 50-yard field goal, 0:00. Tied 6-6. Drive: 10 plays, 56 yards, 1:46.

Third quarter

- FRES - Josiah Freeman 3-yard run (Manaki Watanabe kick), 9:41. Bulldogs 13-6. Drive: 6 plays, 56 yards, 3:12.

Fourth quarter

- FRES - Manaki Watanabe 31-yard field goal, 11:00. Bulldogs 16-6. Drive: 5 plays, 45 yards, 2:31.
- FRES - Julius Gillick 8-yard run (Manaki Watanabe kick), 3:54. Bulldogs 23-6. Drive: 1 play, 8 yards, 0:06.
- FRES - Manaki Watanabe 33-yard field goal, 3:15. Bulldogs 26-6. Drive: 4 plays, 5 yards, 0:29.

Statistics	FRES	WSU
First downs	15	9
Plays–yards	68-375	58-182
Rushes–yards	35-130	24-30
Passing yards	245	152
Passing: comp–att–int	24-33-0	21-34-1
Time of possession	35:59	24:01

Team	Category	Player	Statistics
Fresno State	Passing	Jayden Mandal	24/33, 245 yards
Fresno State	Rushing	Rayshon Luke	6 carries, 46 yards
Fresno State	Receiving	Josiah Freeman	7 receptions, 61 yards
Washington State	Passing	Caden Pinnick	21/34, 152 yards, INT
Washington State	Rushing	Kirby Vorhees	6 carries, 25 yards
Washington State	Receiving	Darrius Clemons	3 receptions, 33 yards

=== at Utah State ===
Washington State Cougars (1–4) at Utah State Aggies (1–4) – Game summary

Quarter	1	2	3	4	Total
Cougars	6	10	0	0	16
Aggies	0	3	7	7	17

at Maverik Stadium • Logan, Utah

- Date: October 9
- Game time: 6:00 PM
- Game weather: Clear
- Game attendance: 20,806
- Referee: Chris Snead
- TV announcers (The CW): Chris Fisher, Isaiah Stanback and Bryan Walters

Game information

First quarter

- WSU - Jack Stevens 40-yard field goal, 13:26. Cougars 3-0. Drive: 4 plays, 3 yards, 1:31.
- WSU - Jack Stevens 43-yard field goal, 1:02. Cougars 6-0. Drive: 15 plays, 54 yards, 9:20.

Second quarter

- USU - Kian Afrookhteh 48-yard field goal, 14:38. Cougars 6-3. Drive: 7 plays, 35 yards, 1:24.
- WSU - Jack Stevens 50-yard field, 11:10. Cougars 9-3. Drive: 8 plays, 43 yards, 3:28.
- WSU - Leo Pulalasi 54-yard run (Jack Stevens kick), 3:32. Cougars 16-3. Drive: 4 plays, 53 yards, 2:17.

Third quarter

- USU - Eli Wood 27-yard pass from Grady Brosterhous (Kian Afrookhteh kick), 7:08. Cougars 16-10. Drive: 5 plays, 39 yards, 1:51.

Fourth quarter

- USU - Javen Jacobs 2-yard run (Kian Afrookhteh kick), 6:22. Aggies 17-16. Drive: 3 plays, 19 yards, 1:33.

Statistics	WSU	USU
First downs	15	11
Plays–yards	68–257	56–236
Rushes–yards	32–101	30–86
Passing yards	156	150
Passing: comp–att–int	23–36–0	11–26–0
Time of possession	35:40	24:20

Team	Category	Player	Statistics
Washington State	Passing	Caden Pinnick	23/36, 156 yards
Washington State	Rushing	Leo Pulalasi	8 carries, 60 yards, TD
Washington State	Receiving	Trey Leckner	4 receptions, 34 yards
Utah State	Passing	Grady Brosterhous	11/26, 150 yards, TD
Utah State	Rushing	Javen Jacobs	15 carries, 62 yards, TD
Utah State	Receiving	Eli Wood	6 receptions, 84 yards, TD

=== at Oregon State ===
Washington State Cougars (1–5) at Oregon State Beavers (4–2) – Game summary

Quarter	1	2	3	4	Total
Cougars	0	10	6	14	30
Beavers	17	10	7	14	48

at Reser Stadium • Corvallis, Oregon

- Date: October 17
- Game time: 3:00 PM
- Game weather: Cloudy • Temperature: 67 °F (19 °C) • Wind: NE 6 mph
- Game attendance: 39,257
- Referee: Chris Wiggins
- TV announcers (USA): Nate Gatter, Ryan Leaf and Lauren Green

Game information

First quarter

- ORST - Jake Reichle 1-yard run (Caleb Ojeda kick), 7:13. Beavers 7-0. Drive: 11 plays, 62 yards, 4:32.
- ORST - Jesse Legree 90-yard pass from Braden Atkinson (Caleb Ojeda kick), 4:46. Beavers 14-0. Drive: 1 play, 90 yards, 0:13.
- ORST - Caleb Ojeda 48-yard field goal, 1:23. Beavers 17-0. Drive: 6 plays, 41 yards, 2:03.

Second quarter

- WSU - Jack Stevens 19-yard field goal, 11:12. Beavers 17-3. Drive: 11 plays, 74 yards, 5:11.
- ORST - Caleb Ojeda 46-yard field goal, 3:59. Beavers 20-3. Drive: 8 plays, 47 yards, 3:34.
- ORST - AJ Newberry 88-yard pass from Braden Atkinson (Caleb Ojeda kick), 3:59. Beavers 27-3. Drive: 1 play, 88 yards, 0:14.
- WSU - Branden Ganashamoorthy 40-yard pass from Owen Eshelman (Jack Stevens kick), 1:53. Beavers 27-10. Drive: 6 plays, 75 yards, 2:06.

Third quarter

- ORST - Jesse Legree 5-yard pass from Braden Atkinson (Caleb Ojeda kick), 9:01. Beavers 34-10. Drive: 7 plays, 66 yards, 3:01.
- WSU - Julian Dugger 3-yard run (two-point pass conversion failed), 4:15. Beavers 34-16. Drive: 9 plays, 75 yards, 4:46.

Fourth quarter

- ORST - Jake Reichle 1-yard run (Caleb Ojeda kick), 11:40. Beavers 41-16. Drive: 13 plays, 75 yards, 7:35.
- WSU - Daniel Blood 6-yard pass from Owen Eshelman (two-point pass conversion failed), 9:03. Beavers 41-22. Drive: 7 plays, 75 yards, 2:37.
- WSU - Owen Eshelman 20-yard run (Owen Eshelman pass to Branden Ganashamoorthy for two-point conversion), 1:37. Beavers 41-30. Drive: 15 plays, 76 yards, 3:59.
- ORST - Cornell Hatcher Jr. 16-yard run (Caleb Ojeda kick), 1:16. Beavers 48-30. Drive: 4 plays, 50 yards, 0:16.

Statistics	WSU	ORST
First downs	25	24
Plays–yards	80–459	71–555
Rushes–yards	30–168	33–208
Passing yards	291	347
Passing: comp–att–int	33–50–1	23–38–0
Time of possession	30:40	29:20

Team	Category	Player	Statistics
Washington State	Passing	Owen Eshelman	32/49, 289 yards, 2 TD, INT
Washington State	Rushing	Owen Eshelman	15 carries, 136 yards, TD
Washington State	Receiving	Branden Ganashamoorthy	11 receptions, 147 yards, TD
Oregon State	Passing	Braden Atkinson	23/38, 347 yards, 3 TD
Oregon State	Rushing	AJ Newberry	11 carries, 105 yards
Oregon State	Receiving	AJ Newberry	5 receptions, 120 yards, TD

=== No. 21 Boise State ===
No. 21 Boise State Broncos (5–1) at Washington State Cougars (1–6) – Game summary

Quarter	1	2	3	4	Total
No. 21 Broncos	7	3	0	21	31
Cougars	0	7	3	0	10

at Martin Stadium • Pullman, Washington

- Date: October 24
- Game time: 3:00 PM
- Game weather: Sunny • Temperature: 53 °F (12 °C) • Wind: W 5 mph
- Game attendance: 2,730
- Referee: Gary Reed
- TV announcers (USA): Nate Gatter, Ryan Leaf and Lauren Green

Game information

First quarter

- BOIS - Sire Gaines 9-yard run (Canaan Moore kick), 4:24. Broncos 7-0. Drive: 7 plays, 74 yards, 4:35.

Second quarter

- WSU - Kirby Vorhees 1-yard run (Jack Stevens kick), 0:31. Tied 7-7. Drive: 16 plays, 73 yards, 6:44.
- BOIS - Canaan Moore 28-yard field goal, 0:00. Broncos 10-7. Drive: 8 plays, 54 yards, 0:46.

Third quarter

- WSU - Jack Stevens 47-yard field goal, 5:53. Tied 10-10. Drive: 8 plays, 31 yards, 3:48.

Fourth quarter

- BOIS - Cam Bates 6-yard pass from Maddux Madsen (Canaan Moore kick), 13:33. Broncos 17-10. Drive: 15 plays, 70 yards, 7:14.
- BOIS - Dylan Riley 33-yard run (Canaan Moore kick), 11:40. Broncos 24-10. Drive: 2 plays, 33 yards, 0:43.
- BOIS - Dylan Riley 72-yard run (Canaan Moore kick), 6:26. Broncos 31-10. Drive: 3 plays, 90 yards, 1:48.

Statistics	BOIS	WSU
First downs	21	19
Plays–yards	61–407	73–244
Rushes–yards	37–258	33–53
Passing yards	149	191
Passing: comp–att–int	14–24–0	21–40–1
Time of possession	29:12	30:48

Team	Category	Player	Statistics
Boise State	Passing	Maddux Madsen	14/23, 149 yards, TD
Boise State	Rushing	Dylan Riley	13 carries, 128 yards, 2 TD
Boise State	Receiving	Rasean Jones	5 receptions, 69 yards
Washington State	Passing	Owen Eshelman	21/40, 191 yards, INT
Washington State	Rushing	Owen Eshelman	23 carries, 33 yards
Washington State	Receiving	Branden Ganashamoorthy	4 receptions, 58 yards

=== at San Diego State ===
Washington State Cougars (1–7) at San Diego State Aztecs (3–5) – Game summary

Quarter	1	2	3	4	Total
Cougars	7	7	0	6	20
Aztecs	7	10	3	6	26

at Snapdragon Stadium • San Diego, California

- Date: October 31
- Game time: 4:00 PM
- Game weather: Cloudy • Temperature: 71 °F (22 °C) • Wind: N 8 mph
- Game attendance: 19,184
- Referee: John Love
- TV announcers (CBSSN): Rich Waltz, Adam Breneman and Jordan Giorgio

Game information

First quarter

- SDSU - Javion Kinnard 9-yard run (Cooper DiLeva kick), 7:27. Aztecs 7-0. Drive: 8 plays, 79 yards, 3:05.
- WSU - Owen Eshelman 4-yard run (Jack Stevens kick), 2:19. Tied 7-7. Drive: 9 plays, 75 yards, 4:59.

Second quarter

- SDSU - Javion Kinnard 10-yard run (Cooper DiLeva kick), 12:34. Aztecs 14-7. Drive: 11 plays, 79 yards, 4:39.
- WSU - Kirby Vorhees 2-yard run (Jack Stevens kick), 6:19. Tied 14-14. Drive: 12 plays, 64 yards, 6:15.
- SDSU - Cooper DiLeva 36-yard field goal, 3:16. Aztecs 17-14. Drive: 8 plays, 47 yards, 3:03.

Third quarter

- SDSU - Cooper DiLeva 45-yard field goal, 8:25. Aztecs 20-14. Drive: 9 plays, 43 yards, 4:05.

Fourth quarter

- SDSU - Jackson Ford 2-yard pass from Bert Emanuel Jr. (two-point conversion failed), 9:47. Aztecs 26-14. Drive: 15 plays, 65 yards, 7:11.
- WSU - Owen Eshelman 2-yard run (Jack Stevens PAT missed), 6:55. Aztecs 26-20. Drive: 7 plays, 67 yards, 2:51.

Statistics	WSU	SDSU
First downs	25	18
Plays–yards	72-367	59-306
Rushes–yards	30-68	37-202
Passing yards	299	104
Passing: comp–att–int	30-42-1	13-22-1
Time of possession	33:05	26:55

Team	Category	Player	Statistics
Washington State	Passing	Owen Eshelman	30/42, 299 yards, INT
Washington State	Rushing	Owen Eshelman	16 carries, 34 yards, 2 TD
Washington State	Receiving	Daniel Blood	8 receptions, 105 yards
San Diego State	Passing	Stone Saunders	12/21, 102 yards, INT
San Diego State	Rushing	Lucky Sutton	18 carries, 115 yards
San Diego State	Receiving	Bert Emanuel Jr.	3 receptions, 47 yards

=== Colorado State ===
Colorado State Rams (3–6) at Washington State Cougars (1–8) – Game summary

Quarter	1	2	3	4	Total
Rams	0	7	0	0	7
Cougars	14	24	21	14	73

at Martin Stadium • Pullman, Washington

- Date: November 14
- Game time: 7:30 PM
- TV announcers (CBSSN): Rich Waltz, Adam Breneman and Jordan Giorgio

Statistics	CSU	WSU
First downs		
Plays–yards		
Rushes–yards		
Passing yards		
Passing: comp–att–int		
Time of possession		

Team	Category	Player	Statistics
Colorado State	Passing		
Colorado State	Rushing		
Colorado State	Receiving		
Washington State	Passing		
Washington State	Rushing		
Washington State	Receiving		

=== at Texas State ===
Washington State Cougars (2–8) at Texas State Bobcats (6–4) – Game summary

Quarter	1	2	3	4	Total
Cougars	0	0	0	0	0
Bobcats	0	0	0	0	0

at UFCU Stadium • San Marcos, Texas

- Date: November 21
- Game time: 3:00 PM
- TV: USA

Statistics	WSU	TXST
First downs		
Plays–yards		
Rushes–yards		
Passing yards		
Passing: comp–att–int		
Time of possession		

Team	Category	Player	Statistics
Washington State	Passing		
Washington State	Rushing		
Washington State	Receiving		
Texas State	Passing		
Texas State	Rushing		
Texas State	Receiving		

=== Pac-12 Opponent TBA ===
Pac-12 opponent TBA at Washington State Cougars (0–0) – Game summary

Quarter	1	2	3	4	Total
TBA	0	0	0	0	0
Aggies	0	0	0	0	0

at Martin Stadium • Pullman, Washington

- Date: November 28
- Game time: TBD

Statistics	TBA	WSU
First downs		
Plays–yards		
Rushes–yards		
Passing yards		
Passing: comp–att–int		
Time of possession		

Team	Category	Player	Statistics
Pac-12 opponent TBA	Passing		
Pac-12 opponent TBA	Rushing		
Pac-12 opponent TBA	Receiving		
Washington State	Passing		
Washington State	Rushing		
Washington State	Receiving		
