= 2026 Oregon State Beavers football team =

American college football season

2026 Oregon State Beavers football
- Conference: Pac-12 Conference
- Record: 6–5 (4–3 Pac-12)
- Head coach: JaMarcus Shephard (1st season)
- Offensive coordinator: Mitch Dahlen (1st season)
- Co-offensive coordinator: Ryan Wallace (1st season)
- Offensive scheme: Spread
- Defensive coordinator: Mike MacIntyre (1st season)
- Co-defensive coordinator: Cort Dennison (1st season)
- Base defense: 3–4
- Home stadium: Reser Stadium

2026 Pac-12 Conference football standings
| | Conf. | | | Overall |
| Team | W | | L | W | | L |
|---|---|---|---|---|---|---|
| No. 17 Boise State y | 6 | – | 1 | 9 | – | 2 |
| San Diego State y | 5 | – | 2 | 6 | – | 5 |
| Texas State | 5 | – | 2 | 7 | – | 4 |
| Oregon State | 4 | – | 3 | 6 | – | 5 |
| Utah State | 3 | – | 4 | 4 | – | 7 |
| Fresno State | 3 | – | 4 | 6 | – | 5 |
| Washington State | 1 | – | 6 | 2 | – | 9 |
| Colorado State | 1 | – | 6 | 3 | – | 8 |
Championship: San Diego State at Boise State
y – Championship game participant; As of November 22, 2026; Rankings from CFP rankings

The 2026 Oregon State Beavers football team represents Oregon State University in the Pac-12 Conference during the 2026 NCAA Division I FBS football season. The Beavers play their home games at Reser Stadium in Corvallis, Oregon, and are led by first-year head coach JaMarcus Shephard.

== Offseason ==
=== Transfers ===
==== Outgoing ====
| Player | Position | Destination |
|---|---|---|
| Jimmy Valsin III | WR | Abilene Christian |
| Adam Hawkes | OT | Arkansas |
| Jacob Strand | OT | Auburn |
| Tristan Ti'a | QB | Auburn |
| Zander Esty | IOL | Boise State |
| Jayden Tuia | OT | Colorado State |
| Kallen Gutridge | QB | Eastern Oregon |
| Jamai East | WR | Eastern Washington |
| Kelze Howard | DL | Georgia State |
| Trent Walker | WR | Houston |
| Zachary Card | WR | Idaho |
| Salahadin Allah | RB | Iowa State |
| Conrad Hussey | S | Miami (FL) |
| Riley Williams | TE | Mississippi State |
| Dexter Foster | LB | Nebraska |
| Carson Kolb | TE | Oklahoma State |
| Bleu Dantzler | EDGE | Oregon |
| Ellijah Washington | WR | Sacramento State |
| Gabarri Johnson | QB | Samford |
| Kai Wallin | EDGE | San Diego State |
| Shamar Meikle | EDGE | South Florida |
| Amarion York | S | Southern Utah |
| Dylan Sikorski | IOL | Texas |
| Jojo Johnson | DL | Texas Tech |
| David Wells Jr. | WR | Tulsa |
| Keyon Cox | OT | UAB |
| Thomas Collins | DL | UCF |
| Tahjae Mullix | DL | UConn |
| Zakaih Saez | EDGE | UConn |
| Taz Reddicks | WR | UNLV |
| Dylan Black | LS | USC |
| Ryan Berger | OT | Wake Forest |
| Darrius Clemons | WR | Washington State |
| Jalil Tucker | CB | Washington State |
| Anthony Hankerson | RB | Unknown |

==== Incoming ====
| Player | Position | Previous school |
|---|---|---|
| Aeryn Hampton | WR | Alabama |
| Teko Shoats | OT | Bethune–Cookman |
| DeCorion Temple | TE | Central Michigan |
| Ish Findlayter | DL | Duquesne |
| Ja'Bari Odoemenem | LB | Duquesne |
| Isaiah Houi | CB | Eastern Illinois |
| Kwan Johnson | OT | Eastern Illinois |
| Dylan Layne | LB | Idaho |
| Carter Guillaume | IOL | Louisville |
| Jonathan Zarut | LS | Memphis |
| Braden Atkinson | QB | Mercer |
| Adonis McDaniel | WR | Mercer |
| Daniel Matagi | DL | Portland State |
| Tug Sanford | LS | Stephen F. Austin |
| Jadyn Oh | K | Syracuse |
| Aaron Butler | WR | Texas |
| Xayvion Noland | WR | UT Rio Grande Valley |
| Eric Olsen | TE | Utah Tech |
| AJ Newberry | RB | Vanderbilt |
| Brady Jones | QB | Western Michigan |
| Broderick Shull | OT | Auburn |

== Schedule ==
| Date | Time | Opponent | Site | TV | Result | Attendance |
|---|---|---|---|---|---|---|
| September 5 | 9:00 a.m. | at No. 23 Houston* | TDECU Stadium; Houston, TX | ESPN | L 20–33 | 28,742 |
| September 12 | 4:30 p.m. | No. 13 Texas Tech* | Reser Stadium; Corvallis, OR | CBS | L 24–35 | 30,539 |
| September 19 | 8:00 p.m. | No. 3 (FCS) Montana* | Reser Stadium; Corvallis, OR | USA | W 52–17 | 34,030 |
| September 26 | 6:00 p.m. | at UTEP* | Sun Bowl; El Paso, TX | MW+ | W 33–7 | 15,099 |
| October 3 | 3:00 p.m. | at Colorado State | Canvas Stadium; Fort Collins, CO | USA | W 56–26 | 41,000 |
| October 10 | 3:00 p.m. | San Diego State | Reser Stadium; Corvallis, OR | USA | W 66–14 | 37,361 |
| October 17 | 3:00 p.m. | Washington State | Reser Stadium; Corvallis, OR | USA | W 48–30 | 39,257 |
| October 31 | 8:00 p.m. | at Fresno State | Valley Children's Stadium; Fresno, CA | USA | L 22–38 | 32,501 |
| November 7 | 7:30 p.m. | Texas State | Reser Stadium; Corvallis, OR | The CW | L 21–42 | 36,714 |
| November 14 | 3:00 p.m | at No. 24 Boise State | Albertsons Stadium; Boise, ID (College GameDay) | USA | L 41–46 | 35,084 |
| November 21 | 7:30 p.m. | Utah State | Reser Stadium; Corvallis, OR | CBSSN | W 31–24 | 34,359 |
| November 28 | 7:00 p.m. | at Fresno State (Note: In the 2026 season, the Pac-12 will use a "flex" scheduling model for Week 13. After the round-robin conference schedule, the conference will determine the pairings for Week 13. "Flex" games will not count in the conference standings.) | Valley Children's Stadium; Fresno, CA | The CW | | |
*Non-conference game; Rankings from AP Poll (and CFP Rankings, after November 3) – Released prior to game; All times are in Pacific time

== Game summaries ==
=== at No. 23 Houston ===
Oregon State Beavers (0–0) at No. 23 Houston Cougars (0–0) – Game summary

| Quarter | 1 | 2 | 3 | 4 | Total |
|---|---|---|---|---|---|
| Beavers | 7 | 0 | 6 | 7 | 20 |
| No. 23 Cougars | 9 | 10 | 7 | 7 | 33 |

at TDECU Stadium • Houston, Texas

- Date: September 5
- Game time: 9:00 a.m.
- Game weather: Cloudy • Temperature: 89 °F (32 °C) • Wind: W at 1 mph (1.6 km/h)
- Game attendance: 28,742
- Referee: Gary Reed
- TV announcers (ESPN): Anish Shroff, Andre Ware and Morgan Uber

Game information

First quarter

- HOU – Amare Thomas 31-yard pass from Conner Weigman (Jonathan Dimas kick failed), 8:13. Cougars 6–0. Drive: 10 plays, 85 yards, 4:06.
- ORST – Braden Atkinson 3-yard run (Caleb Ojeda kick), 6:17. Beavers 7–6. Drive: 4 plays, 80 yards, 1:50.
- HOU – Jonathan Dimas 42-yard field goal, 4:15. Cougars 9–7. Drive: 6 plays, 41 yards, 2:02.

Second quarter

- HOU – Re'Shaun Sanford II 56-yard run (Jonathan Dimas kick), 6:27. Cougars 16–7. Drive: 4 plays, 70 yards, 1:46.
- HOU – Jonathan Dimas 32-yard field goal, 0:35. Cougars 19–7. Drive: 11 plays, 57 yards, 2:22.

Third quarter

- HOU – Makhi Hughes 1-yard run (Jonathan Dimas kick), 6:40. Cougars 26–7. Drive: 9 plays, 74 yards, 5:01.
- ORST – Jesse Legree 7-yard pass from Braden Atkinson (pass failed), 0:44. Cougars 26–13. Drive: 14 plays, 89 yards, 5:56.

Fourth quarter

- ORST – AJ Newberry 4-yard run (Caleb Ojeda kick), 9:02. Cougars 26–20. Drive: 7 plays, 75 yards, 3:45.
- HOU – Conner Weigman 1-yard run (Jonathan Dimas kick), 5:01. Cougars 33–20. Drive: 9 plays, 75 yards, 4:01.

| Statistics | ORST | HOU |
|---|---|---|
| First downs | 20 | 24 |
| Plays–yards | 54–402 | 72–533 |
| Rushes–yards | 25–26 | 41–228 |
| Passing yards | 376 | 305 |
| Passing: comp–att–int | 29–48–0 | 20–31–1 |
| Turnovers | 0 | 2 |
| Time of possession | 29:10 | 30:50 |

| Team | Category | Player | Statistics |
|---|---|---|---|
| Oregon State | Passing | Braden Atkinson | 29/48, 376 yards, TD |
| Oregon State | Rushing | Kourdey Glass | 6 carries, 25 yards |
| Oregon State | Receiving | Jesse Legree | 5 receptions, 136 yards, TD |
| Houston | Passing | Conner Weigman | 20/30, 305 yards, TD, INT |
| Houston | Rushing | Makhi Hughes | 17 carries, 98 yards, TD |
| Houston | Receiving | Amare Thomas | 8 receptions, 133 yards, TD |

=== No. 13 Texas Tech ===
No. 13 Texas Tech Red Raiders (1–0) at Oregon State Beavers (0–1) – Game summary

| Quarter | 1 | 2 | 3 | 4 | Total |
|---|---|---|---|---|---|
| No. 13 Red Raiders | 0 | 14 | 7 | 14 | 35 |
| Beavers | 0 | 7 | 14 | 3 | 24 |

at Reser Stadium, Corvallis, Oregon

- Date: September 12
- Game time: 4:30 p.m.
- Game weather: Cloudy • Temperature: 64 °F (18 °C) • Wind: SW 8 mph
- Game attendance: 30,539
- Referee: Kevin Boitmann
- TV announcers (CBS): Rich Waltz, Adam Breneman, Brian Kelly, and Jordan Giorgio

Game information
First quarter
- No scoring plays

Second quarter

- TTU – Tommy Castellanos 7-yard run (Stone Harrington kick), 7:35. Red Raiders 7–0. Drive: 6 plays, 41 yards, 1:55.
- ORST – Jesse Legree 75-yard pass from Braden Atkinson (Caleb Ojeda kick), 7:25. Tied 7–7. Drive: 1 play, 75 yards, 0:10.
- TTU – Cameron Dickey 1-yard run (Stone Harrington kick), 3:01. Red Raiders 14–7. Drive: 11 plays, 73 yards, 4:18.

Third quarter

- ORST – Braden Atkinson 4-yard pass from A. J. Newberry (run failed), 11:22. Red Raiders 14–13. Drive: 6 plays, 76 yards, 2:47.
- TTU – J'Koby Williams 38-yard run (Stone Harrington kick), 8:05. Red Raiders 21–13. Drive: 8 plays, 75 yards, 3:12.
- ORST – Jesse Legree 37-yard pass from Braden Atkinson (Braden Atkinson run), 4:55. Tied 21–21. Drive: 8 plays, 75 yards, 3:10.

Fourth quarter

- ORST – Caleb Ojeda 34-yard field goal, 13:23. Beavers 24–21. Drive: 4 plays, 6 yards, 1:37.
- TTU – Coy Eakin 32-yard pass from Will Hammond (Stone Harrington kick), 6:37. Red Raiders 28–24. Drive: 6 plays, 62 yards, 2:54.
- TTU – Matt Ludwig 8-yard pass from Tommy Castellanos (Stone Harrington kick), 1:03. Red Raiders 35–24. Drive: 3 plays, 11 yards, 0:16.

| Statistics | TTU | ORST |
|---|---|---|
| First downs | 22 | 20 |
| Plays–yards | 74–352 | 71–472 |
| Rushes–yards | 46–155 | 19–55 |
| Passing yards | 197 | 417 |
| Passing: comp–att–int | 21–28–0 | 32–52–1 |
| Turnovers | 1 | 1 |
| Time of possession | 29:35 | 30:14 |

| Team | Category | Player | Statistics |
|---|---|---|---|
| Texas Tech | Passing | Will Hammond | 20/27, 189 yards, TD |
| Texas Tech | Rushing | J'Koby Williams | 20 carries, 116 yards, TD |
| Texas Tech | Receiving | Coy Eakin | 6 receptions, 79 yards, TD |
| Oregon State | Passing | Braden Atkinson | 29/49, 399 yards, 2 TD, INT |
| Oregon State | Rushing | Aaron Butler | 3 carries, 34 yards |
| Oregon State | Receiving | Jesse Legree | 8 receptions, 240 yards, 2 TD |

=== No. 3 (FCS) Montana ===
No. 3 (FCS) Montana Grizzlies (3–0) at Oregon State Beavers (0–2) – Game summary

| Quarter | 1 | 2 | 3 | 4 | Total |
|---|---|---|---|---|---|
| No. 3 (FCS) Grizzlies | 0 | 3 | 7 | 7 | 17 |
| Beavers | 14 | 21 | 7 | 10 | 52 |

at Reser Stadium • Corvallis, Oregon

- Date: September 19
- Game time: 8:00 p.m.
- Game weather: Clear • Temperature: 64 °F (18 °C) • Wind: NW 5 mph
- Game attendance: 34,030
- Referee: Chris Snead
- TV announcers (USA): Ted Robinson, Darius Walker and Dalen Cuff

Game information

First quarter

- ORST - Eric Olsen 19-yard pass from Braden Atkinson (Caleb Ojeda kick), 11:24. Beavers 7-0. Drive: 5 plays, 67 yards, 2:22.
- ORST - Aeryn Hampton 21-yard pass from Braden Atkinson (Caleb Ojeda kick), 4:48. Beavers 14-0. Drive: 6 plays, 67 yards, 3:09.

Second quarter

- MONT - Jo Silver 39-yard field goal, 11:55. Beavers 14-3. Drive: 9 plays, 27 yards, 3:50.
- ORST - Jesse Legree 23-yard pass from Braden Atkinson (Caleb Ojeda kick), 8:42. Beavers 21-3. Drive: 7 plays, 90 yards, 3:09.
- ORST - DeCorion Temple 11-yard pass from Braden Atkinson (Caleb Ojeda kick), 5:17. Beavers 28-3. Drive: 7 plays, 33 yards, 2:43.
- ORST - Braden Atkinson 1-yard run (Caleb Ojeda kick), 0:07. Beavers 35-3. Drive: 11 plays, 84 yards, 1:36.

Third quarter

- ORST - Aaron Butler 27-yard pass from Braden Atkinson (Caleb Ojeda kick), 14:19. Beavers 42-3. Drive: 3 plays, 75 yards, 0:41.
- MONT - Reese Brooks 2-yard pass from Keali'i Ah Yat (Jo Silver kick), 2:05. Beavers 42-10. Drive: 12 plays, 72 yards, 5:30.

Fourth quarter

- ORST - Cornell Hatcher Jr. 14-yard run (Caleb Ojeda kick), 11:26. Beavers 49-10. Drive: 11 plays, 81 yards, 5:33.
- MONT - Brooks Davis 40-yard pass from Keali'i Ah Yat (Jo Silver kick), 8:53. Beavers 49-17. Drive: 6 plays, 75 yards, 2:33.
- ORST - Caleb Ojeda 22-yard field goal, 2:24. Beavers 52-17. Drive: 4 plays, 7 yards, 2:13.

| Statistics | MONT | ORST |
|---|---|---|
| First downs | 22 | 28 |
| Plays–yards | 72–338 | 68–508 |
| Rushes–yards | 27–96 | 32–144 |
| Passing yards | 242 | 366 |
| Passing: comp–att–int | 30–45–1 | 26–36–0 |
| Turnovers | 2 | 1 |
| Time of possession | 30:53 | 29:07 |

| Team | Category | Player | Statistics |
|---|---|---|---|
| Montana | Passing | Keali'i Ah Yat | 27/40, 215 yards, 2 TD |
| Montana | Rushing | Eli Gillman | 18 carries, 81 yards |
| Montana | Receiving | Brooks Davis | 11 receptions, 135 yards, TD |
| Oregon State | Passing | Braden Atkinson | 22/30, 333 yards, 5 TD |
| Oregon State | Rushing | Tre Garrison | 14 carries, 56 yards |
| Oregon State | Receiving | Jesse Legree | 4 receptions, 100 yards, TD |

=== at UTEP ===
Oregon State Beavers (1–2) at UTEP Miners (1–2) – Game summary

| Quarter | 1 | 2 | 3 | 4 | Total |
|---|---|---|---|---|---|
| Beavers | 17 | 3 | 7 | 6 | 33 |
| Miners | 0 | 0 | 7 | 0 | 7 |

at Sun Bowl • El Paso, Texas

- Date: September 26
- Game time: 6:00 p.m.
- Game weather: Sunny • Temperature: 85 °F (29 °C) • Wind: W at 3 miles per hour (4.8 km/h)
- Game attendance: 15,099
- Referee: John Love
- TV announcers (MW+): Andy Morgan and Cole Freytag

Game information

First quarter

- ORST - AJ Newberry 12-yard run (Caleb Ojeda kick), 12:23. Beavers 7-0. Drive: 7 plays, 75 yards, 2:37.
- ORST - Caleb Ojeda 37-yard field goal, 7:22. Beavers 10-0. Drive: 7 plays, 40 yards, 2:21.
- ORST - Jesse Legree 14-yard pass from Braden Atkinson (Caleb Ojeda kick), 1:50. Beavers 17-0. Drive: 7 plays, 75 yards, 3:54.

Second quarter

- ORST - Caleb Ojeda 35-yard field goal, 2:20. Beavers 20-0. Drive: 8 plays, 65 yards, 3:37.

Third quarter

- UTEP - Carver Cheeks 6-yard pass from EJ Colson Jr. (Carlos Arreola kick), 10:08. Beavers 20-7. Drive: 9 plays, 75 yards, 4:52.
- ORST - Jesse Legree 19-yard pass from Braden Atkinson (Caleb Ojeda kick), 6:16. Beavers 27-7. Drive: 8 plays, 75 yards, 3:52.

Fourth quarter

- ORST - Jameson Powell 18-yard pass from Braeden Atkinson (Two-point pass conversion failed), 14:56. Beavers 33-7. Drive: 6 plays, 74 yards, 2:14.

| Statistics | ORST | UTEP |
|---|---|---|
| First downs | 25 | 18 |
| Plays–yards | 57–451 | 66–222 |
| Rushes–yards | 23–150 | 41–92 |
| Passing yards | 301 | 130 |
| Passing: comp–att–int | 24–34–1 | 18–25–1 |
| Turnovers | 1 | 1 |
| Time of possession | 25:37 | 34:23 |

| Team | Category | Player | Statistics |
|---|---|---|---|
| Oregon State | Passing | Braden Atkinson | 24/34, 301 yards, 3 TD, INT |
| Oregon State | Rushing | AJ Newberry | 11 carries, 111 yards, TD |
| Oregon State | Receiving | Jesse Legree | 6 receptions, 109 yards, 2 TD |
| UTEP | Passing | EJ Colson Jr. | 16/23, 119 yards, TD, INT |
| UTEP | Rushing | Tavorus Jones | 10 carries, 34 yards |
| UTEP | Receiving | Jaden Smith | 8 receptions, 62 yards |

=== at Colorado State ===
Oregon State Beavers (2–2) at Colorado State Rams (2–2) – Game summary

| Quarter | 1 | 2 | 3 | 4 | Total |
|---|---|---|---|---|---|
| Beavers | 14 | 21 | 7 | 14 | 56 |
| Rams | 7 | 7 | 6 | 6 | 26 |

at Canvas Stadium • Fort Collins, Colorado

- Date: October 3
- Game time: 3:00 p.m.
- Game attendance: 41,000
- TV: USA

| Statistics | ORST | CSU |
|---|---|---|
| First downs | 34 | 20 |
| Plays–yards | 70-650 | 57-366 |
| Rushes–yards | 223 | 188 |
| Passing yards | 427 | 178 |
| Passing: comp–att–int | 31-34-0 | 17-28-1 |
| Time of possession | 34:57 | 25"03 |

| Team | Category | Player | Statistics |
|---|---|---|---|
| Oregon State | Passing | Braden Atkinson | 31/34, 427 yards, 3 TD |
| Oregon State | Rushing | AJ Newberry | 15 carries, 90 yards |
| Oregon State | Receiving | Jesse Legree | 5 receptions, 156 yards, 3 TD |
| Colorado State | Passing | Ksaan Farrar | 17/27, 178 yards, 1 TD |
| Colorado State | Rushing | Durell Robinson | 21 carries, 117 yards, 1 TD |
| Colorado State | Receiving | Reginald Vick | 5 receptions, 99 yards |

=== San Diego State ===
San Diego State Aztecs (2–3) at Oregon State Beavers (3–2) – Game summary

| Quarter | 1 | 2 | 3 | 4 | Total |
|---|---|---|---|---|---|
| Aztecs | 0 | 7 | 7 | 0 | 14 |
| Beavers | 14 | 24 | 21 | 7 | 66 |

- Date: October 10
- Game time: 3:00 p.m.
- Game attendance: 37,361
- TV: USA

Game information

First quarter
Second quarter
Third quarter
Fourth quarter

| Statistics | SDSU | ORST |
|---|---|---|
| First downs | 6 | 35 |
| Plays–yards | 48-147 | 92-651 |
| Rushes–yards | 56 | 189 |
| Passing yards | 91 | 462 |
| Passing: comp–att–int | 9-27-1 | 37-47-0 |
| Turnovers | 1 | 0 |
| Time of possession | 17:42 | 42:18 |

| Team | Category | Player | Statistics |
|---|---|---|---|
| San Diego State | Passing | Jayden Denegal | 5/19, 78 yards, TD |
| San Diego State | Rushing | Javion Kinnard | 11 carries, 43 yards |
| San Diego State | Receiving | Jaylon Hawkins | 1 receptions, 43 yards |
| Oregon State | Passing | Braden Atkinson | 29/39, 409 yards, 5 TD |
| Oregon State | Rushing | AJ Newberry | 9 carries, 55 yards, TD |
| Oregon State | Receiving | Jesse Legree | 10 receptions, 191 yards, 3 TD |

=== Washington State ===
Washington State Cougars (1–5) at Oregon State Beavers (4–2) – Game summary

| Quarter | 1 | 2 | 3 | 4 | Total |
|---|---|---|---|---|---|
| Cougars | 0 | 10 | 6 | 14 | 30 |
| Beavers | 17 | 10 | 7 | 14 | 48 |

at Reser Stadium • Corvallis, Oregon

- Date: October 17
- Game time: 3:00 p.m.
- Game weather: Cloudy • Temperature: 67 °F (19 °C) • Wind: NE 6 mph
- Game attendance: 39,257
- Referee: Chris Wiggins
- TV announcers (USA): Nate Gatter, Ryan Leaf and Lauren Green

Game information

First quarter

- ORST - Jake Reichle 1-yard run (Caleb Ojeda kick), 7:13. Beavers 7-0. Drive: 11 plays, 62 yards, 4:32.
- ORST - Jesse Legree 90-yard pass from Braden Atkinson (Caleb Ojeda kick), 4:46. Beavers 14-0. Drive: 1 play, 90 yards, 0:13.
- ORST - Caleb Ojeda 48-yard field goal, 1:23. Beavers 17-0. Drive: 6 plays, 41 yards, 2:03.

Second quarter

- WSU - Jack Stevens 19-yard field goal, 11:12. Beavers 17-3. Drive: 11 plays, 74 yards, 5:11.
- ORST - Caleb Ojeda 46-yard field goal, 3:59. Beavers 20-3. Drive: 8 plays, 47 yards, 3:34.
- ORST - AJ Newberry 88-yard pass from Braden Atkinson (Caleb Ojeda kick), 3:59. Beavers 27-3. Drive: 1 play, 88 yards, 0:14.
- WSU - Branden Ganashamoorthy 40-yard pass from Owen Eshelman (Jack Stevens kick), 1:53. Beavers 27-10. Drive: 6 plays, 75 yards, 2:06.

Third quarter

- ORST - Jesse Legree 5-yard pass from Braden Atkinson (Caleb Ojeda kick), 9:01. Beavers 34-10. Drive: 7 plays, 66 yards, 3:01.
- WSU - Julian Dugger 3-yard run (two-point pass conversion failed), 4:15. Beavers 34-16. Drive: 9 plays, 75 yards, 4:46.

Fourth quarter

- ORST - Jake Reichle 1-yard run (Caleb Ojeda kick), 11:40. Beavers 41-16. Drive: 13 plays, 75 yards, 7:35.
- WSU - Daniel Blood 6-yard pass from Owen Eshelman (two-point pass conversion failed), 9:03. Beavers 41-22. Drive: 7 plays, 75 yards, 2:37.
- WSU - Owen Eshelman 20-yard run (Owen Eshelman pass to Branden Ganashamoorthy for two-point conversion), 1:37. Beavers 41-30. Drive: 15 plays, 76 yards, 3:59.
- ORST - Cornell Hatcher Jr. 16-yard run (Caleb Ojeda kick), 1:16. Beavers 48-30. Drive: 4 plays, 50 yards, 0:16.

| Statistics | WSU | ORST |
|---|---|---|
| First downs | 25 | 24 |
| Plays–yards | 80–459 | 71–555 |
| Rushes–yards | 30–168 | 33–208 |
| Passing yards | 291 | 347 |
| Passing: comp–att–int | 33–50–1 | 23–38–0 |
| Time of possession | 30:40 | 29:20 |

| Team | Category | Player | Statistics |
|---|---|---|---|
| Washington State | Passing | Owen Eshelman | 32/49, 289 yards, 2 TD, INT |
| Washington State | Rushing | Owen Eshelman | 15 carries, 136 yards, TD |
| Washington State | Receiving | Branden Ganashamoorthy | 11 receptions, 147 yards, TD |
| Oregon State | Passing | Braden Atkinson | 23/38, 347 yards, 3 TD |
| Oregon State | Rushing | AJ Newberry | 11 carries, 105 yards |
| Oregon State | Receiving | AJ Newberry | 5 receptions, 120 yards, TD |

=== at Fresno State ===
Oregon State Beavers (5–2) at Fresno State Bulldogs (4–3) – Game summary

| Quarter | 1 | 2 | 3 | 4 | Total |
|---|---|---|---|---|---|
| Beavers | 3 | 6 | 7 | 6 | 22 |
| Bulldogs | 7 | 14 | 17 | 0 | 38 |

at Valley Children's Stadium • Fresno, California

- Date: October 31
- Game time: 8:00 p.m.
- TV: USA

| Statistics | ORST | FRES |
|---|---|---|
| First downs | | |
| Plays–yards | | |
| Rushes–yards | | |
| Passing yards | | |
| Passing: comp–att–int | | |
| Time of possession | | |

| Team | Category | Player | Statistics |
|---|---|---|---|
| Oregon State | Passing | | |
| Oregon State | Rushing | | |
| Oregon State | Receiving | | |
| Fresno State | Passing | | |
| Fresno State | Rushing | | |
| Fresno State | Receiving | | |

=== Texas State ===
Texas State Bobcats (4–4) at Oregon State Beavers (5–3) – Game summary

| Quarter | 1 | 2 | 3 | 4 | Total |
|---|---|---|---|---|---|
| Bobcats | 14 | 7 | 7 | 14 | 42 |
| Beavers | 7 | 0 | 0 | 14 | 21 |

at Reser Stadium • Corvallis, Oregon

- Date: November 7
- Game time: 7:30 p.m.
- TV: The CW

| Statistics | TXST | ORST |
|---|---|---|
| First downs | | |
| Total yards | | |
| Rushing yards | | |
| Passing yards | | |
| Passing: Comp–Att–Int | | |
| Turnovers | | |
| Time of possession | | |

| Team | Category | Player | Statistics |
|---|---|---|---|
| Texas State | Passing | | |
| Texas State | Rushing | | |
| Texas State | Receiving | | |
| Oregon State | Passing | | |
| Oregon State | Rushing | | |
| Oregon State | Receiving | | |

=== at No. 24 Boise State ===
Oregon State Beavers (5–4) at No. 24 Boise State Broncos (8–1) – Game summary

| Quarter | 1 | 2 | 3 | 4 | Total |
|---|---|---|---|---|---|
| Beavers | 7 | 13 | 7 | 14 | 41 |
| No. 24 Broncos | 15 | 17 | 0 | 14 | 46 |

at Albertsons Stadium • Boise, Idaho

- Date: November 14
- Game time: 3:00 p.m.
- TV announcers (USA): Nate Gatter, Ryan Leaf, and Lauren Green

| Statistics | ORST | BOIS |
|---|---|---|
| First downs | | |
| Plays–yards | | |
| Rushes–yards | | |
| Passing yards | | |
| Passing: comp–att–int | | |
| Time of possession | | |

| Team | Category | Player | Statistics |
|---|---|---|---|
| Oregon State | Passing | | |
| Oregon State | Rushing | | |
| Oregon State | Receiving | | |
| Boise State | Passing | | |
| Boise State | Rushing | | |
| Boise State | Receiving | | |

=== Utah State ===
Utah State Aggies (4–6) at Oregon State Beavers (5–5) – Game summary

| Quarter | 1 | 2 | 3 | 4 | Total |
|---|---|---|---|---|---|
| Aggies | 7 | 10 | 0 | 7 | 24 |
| Beavers | 0 | 10 | 7 | 14 | 31 |

at Reser Stadium • Corvallis, Oregon

- Date: November 21
- Game time: 7:30 p.m.
- TV: CBSSN

| Statistics | USU | ORST |
|---|---|---|
| First downs | | |
| Plays–yards | | |
| Rushes–yards | | |
| Passing yards | | |
| Passing: comp–att–int | | |
| Time of possession | | |

| Team | Category | Player | Statistics |
|---|---|---|---|
| Utah State | Passing | | |
| Utah State | Rushing | | |
| Utah State | Receiving | | |
| Oregon State | Passing | | |
| Oregon State | Rushing | | |
| Oregon State | Receiving | | |

=== at Fresno State ===
Oregon State Beavers (6–5) at Fresno State Bulldogs (6–5) – Game summary

| Quarter | 1 | 2 | 3 | 4 | Total |
|---|---|---|---|---|---|
| Beavers | 0 | 0 | 0 | 0 | 0 |
| Bulldogs | 0 | 0 | 0 | 0 | 0 |

at Valley Children's Stadium • Fresno, CA

- Date: November 28
- Game time: 7:00 p.m.
- TV: The CW

| Statistics | ORST | FRES |
|---|---|---|
| First downs | | |
| Plays–yards | | |
| Rushes–yards | | |
| Passing yards | | |
| Passing: comp–att–int | | |
| Time of possession | | |

| Team | Category | Player | Statistics |
|---|---|---|---|
| Oregon State | Passing | | |
| Oregon State | Rushing | | |
| Oregon State | Receiving | | |
| Fresno State | Passing | | |
| Fresno State | Rushing | | |
| Fresno State | Receiving | | |

== Personnel ==
=== Roster and coaching staff ===
2026 Oregon State Beavers football team roster
Players
Coaches
Offense

| Pos. | # | Name | Class |
|---|---|---|---|
| WR | 0 | Aaron Butler | So |
| WR | 1 | Adonis McDaniel | Sr |
| QB | 2 | Braden Atkinson | So |
| RB | 3 | Cornell Hatcher Jr. | So |
| WR | 4 | Xayvion Noland | Jr |
| WR | 5 | Karson Boschma | Sr |
| QB | 6 | Maalik Murphy | Sr |
| WR | 7 | Bubba Hampton | So |
| TE | 8 | DeCorion Temple | Sr |
| QB | 10 | Brady Jones | Sr |
| WR | 12 | Jesse Legree | Fr |
| QB | 13 | Danny Leary | Fr |
| WR | 14 | Eddie Freauff | So |
| WR | 15 | Jameson Powell | Fr |
| WR | 16 | Cynai Thomas | Fr |
| WR | 17 | Malachi Durant | So |
| WR | 18 | Jayden Padgett | Fr |
| QB | 19 | Isaiah Arriaza | Fr |
| WR | 21 | MJ Kennybrew | Fr |
| RB | 22 | Tre Garrison | Fr |
| RB | 23 | AJ Newberry | Sr |
| RB | 25 | Kourdey Glass | Fr |
| RB | 27 | Rocco De La Rosa | Fr |
| RB | 33 | Skyler Jackson | Fr |
| RB | 34 | Jake Reichle | Sr |
| WR | 41 | Jhae Drummer | Sr |
| OL | 50 | Teko Shoats | Jr |
| OL | 51 | Maddox Conway | Fr |
| OL | 52 | Tanu A'aitui | Fr |
| OL | 55 | Van Wells | Sr |
| OL | 56 | Carter Guillaume | So |
| OL | 58 | Jack Wagner | So |
| OL | 59 | Frankie Petuya | Jr |
| OL | 61 | Jake Normoyle | Fr |
| OL | 65 | Peter Langi | Fr |
| OL | 69 | Kwan Johnson | So |
| OL | 70 | Michael Langi | Fr |
| OL | 71 | Josiah Timoteo | Jr |
| OL | 72 | Noah Thomas | Fr |
| OL | 74 | Jacob Anderson | Jr |
| OL | 75 | Will Larkins | Jr |
| OL | 76 | Ben Hartman | Jr |
| OL | 78 | Nathan Elu | Sr |
| OL | 79 | Tyler Voltin | Sr |
| TE | 80 | Eric Olsen | Sr |
| TE | 81 | Landon Cook | Fr |
| TE | 82 | Gabe Milbourn | Sr |
| TE | 84 | Cody Siegner | Fr |
| TE | 87 | Jackson Bowers | Jr |
| WR | 88 | Ross Nickson | Jr |
| TE | 89 | T'Andre Waverly | Fr |

Defense

| Pos. | # | Name | Class |
|---|---|---|---|
| DB | 0 | Harlem Howard | Jr |
| LB | 1 | Dylan Layne | Sr |
| LB | 2 | Aiden Sullivan | Sr |
| LB | 3 | Jabari Odoemenem | Sr |
| DB | 4 | TJ Crandall | Jr |
| DB | 5 | Xander Chisolm | Jr |
| DB | 6 | Jaheim Patterson | Sr |
| DB | 7 | Kahanu Kalahiki | So |
| DB | 8 | Sailasa Vadrawale III | Jr |
| LB | 9 | Raesjon Davis | Sr |
| EDGE | 10 | Logan Knapp | Fr |
| LB | 12 | Gyriece Goodman | Sr |
| LB | 13 | Jeremiah Brown | Fr |
| LB | 14 | Kord Shaw | Sr |
| DB | 15 | RJ Whitten | So |
| EDGE | 17 | Ish Findlayter | Jr |
| EDGE | 18 | Jarrel Comer | Jr |
| DB | 19 | Trey Glasper | So |
| DB | 20 | David Madison | Fr |
| DB | 21 | Noble Thomas Jr. | Jr |
| DB | 22 | Isaiah Houi | Jr |
| DB | 24 | Tyjai Hopper | So |
| DB | 25 | Kai Wheaton | Fr |
| DB | 26 | Marquis Raspberry | Sr |
| DB | 28 | Blake Thompson | Fr |
| DB | 29 | Zephen Walker | Fr |
| DB | 33 | Sean Craig | Fr |
| DB | 36 | Drake Vickers | Sr |
| DB | 38 | Milan Clark | Jr |
| EDGE | 42 | Caleb Metzner | Fr |
| EDGE | 44 | Takari Hickle | Sr |
| DT | 45 | Jesse Myers | Fr |
| LB | 47 | Tyree Blake | Sr |
| LB | 48 | Jessaia Moala | Jr |
| EDGE | 50 | Will Haverland | So |
| LB | 54 | Clive Pond | Jr |
| LB | 55 | Jeremiah Ioane | Fr |
| EDGE | 58 | Adrian Onyiego | So |
| DT | 59 | Tevita Pome'e | Jr |
| DT | 60 | Tiger Black | Jr |
| DT | 62 | Jacob Schuster | Sr |
| EDGE | 88 | Adel Dorr | Fr |
| DT | 90 | Daniel Matagi | Sr |
| DT | 91 | Jaylen Hill | Fr |
| DT | 92 | Nick Norris | Sr |
| DT | 93 | Lolani Finau | Jr |
| DT | 94 | Cameron Hewitt | So |
| DT | 96 | Luke Levengood | Sr |
| DT | 97 | Tyler Bailey | Jr |
| EDGE | 99 | Niklas Fisher | Fr |

Special teams

| Pos. | # | Name | Class |
|---|---|---|---|
| K | 28 | Caleb Ojeda | Sr |
| K | 36 | Cameron Smith | Jr |
| P | 38 | AJ Winsor | Jr |
| LS | 40 | Jonathan Zarut | So |
| LS | 47 | Tug Sanford | Sr |
| K | 98 | Jadyn Oh | Sr |

Head coach

- JaMarcus Shephard

Coordinators/assistant coaches

- Lee Marks – Associate head coach/running backs
- Mitch Dahlen – Offensive coordinator/quarterbacks
- Ryan Wallace – Co-offensive coordinator/tight ends
- James Finley – Wide receivers
- Kirk Barron – Offensive line
- Mike MacIntyre – Defensive coordinator/safeties
- Cort Dennison – Co-defensive coordinator/linebackers
- Mark Hagen – Defensive line/defensive run game coordinator
- Joe Seumalo – Edges
- Dan Rowe – Nickels
- Ricky Brumfield – Special teams coordinator/cornerbacks
- George Frazier – Assistant edges
- Mitchell Malot – Assistant offensive line
- Jamal Morrow – Offensive quality control
- Ben Larson – Special teams quality control
- Zach McBride – Offensive quality control
- Ian Crocker – Defensive quality control
- Jon Maricic – Offensive graduate assistant
- Dre Farris – Offensive graduate assistant
- Nick Pickett – Defensive graduate assistant coach
- Semisi Saluni – Defensive graduate assistant
- Josh Green – Special teams coaching assistant

Legend

- (C) Team captain
- (S) Suspended
- (I) Ineligible
- Injured
- Redshirt

Roster
Last update: 10/3/26
