= JaMarcus Shephard =

American football player and coach (born 1983)

Current position
- Title: Head coach
- Team: Oregon State
- Conference: Pac-12
- Record: 6–5

Biographical details
- Born: May 30, 1983 (age 43); Fort Wayne, Indiana, U.S.

Playing career

Football
- 2001–2004: DePauw
- Position: Wide receiver

Coaching career (HC unless noted)

Football
- 2005: Northrop HS (IN) (WR)
- 2006: Broad Ripple HS (IN) (WR/DB)
- 2011–2012: Western Kentucky (DA)
- 2013: Western Kentucky (OQC)
- 2014: Western Kentucky (WR)
- 2015: Western Kentucky (ST/WR)
- 2016: Washington State (IWR)
- 2017: Purdue (PGC/WR)
- 2018–2021: Purdue (co-OC/WR)
- 2022–2023: Washington (AHC/PGC/WR)
- 2024–2025: Alabama (AHC/co-OC/WR)
- 2026–present: Oregon State

Track and field
- 2007: DePauw (volunteer asst.)

Head coaching record
- Overall: 6–5

JaMarcus Shephard (born May 30, 1983) is an American college football coach. He has been the head coach for Oregon State University since November 2025.

== Playing career ==
Shephard played wide receiver at DePauw University from 2001 to 2004. He finished his career third all-time in school history for career all-purpose yards and first in career kickoff yardage, a record that still stood as of 2019.

== Coaching career ==
Shephard did not initially pursue a career coaching college football, choosing to work at the NCAA's Education Services Division in order to maintain a steady flow of income. He did coach high school football at his alma mater Northrop High School as a wide receivers coach in 2005, before joining the football staff at Broad Ripple High School in Indianapolis as the team's wide receivers and defensive backs coach. He also did a stint at his college alma mater DePauw as a volunteer assistant on the university's track and field team.

=== Western Kentucky ===
After working at the National Center for Drug-Free Sport for four years, Shephard decided to accept a volunteer coaching position on Willie Taggart's staff at Western Kentucky. After Taggart was hired to be the head coach at South Florida, Shephard decided to stay at Western Kentucky under new head coach Bobby Petrino as an offensive quality control assistant working with the wide receivers on shifting the Hilltoppers from a heavy-run offense to a more balanced one. Shephard was promoted to wide receivers coach in 2014, this time on newly hired head coach Jeff Brohm's staff. He was also promoted to special teams coach for the 2015 season.

=== Washington State ===
After Hilltoppers offensive coordinator Tyson Helton resigned to accept an assistant coaching position at USC on his brother Clay's staff, Shephard was offered a promotion to offensive coordinator. Shephard declined the promotion and instead accepted a position on Mike Leach's staff at Washington State as the inside wide receivers coach.

=== Purdue ===
After Jeff Brohm was hired to be the next head coach at Purdue, Shephard joined his staff as the wide receivers coach and passing game coordinator. He was promoted to co-offensive coordinator in 2018 following the resignation of Tony Levine.

=== Washington ===
On January 12, 2022, it was announced that Shephard would join the Washington Huskies as the associate head coach, passing game coordinator, and wide receivers coach.

=== Alabama ===
On February 20, 2024, it was announced that Shephard would be following Kalen DeBoer from Washington to Alabama to become the team's assistant head coach, co-offensive coordinator (alongside Nick Sheridan), and wide receivers coach.

=== Oregon State ===
On November 27, 2025, Shephard was reported to be the main target to become the new head coach at Oregon State. A day later, the university announced he had been hired to be their next head coach.

Shephard had an immediate impact. After two competitive losses to ranked teams, he led the Beavers to five straight wins and a 5–2 record, a dramatic improvement on the previous season's 2–10 overall record. Two of his players, QB Braden Atkinson and WR Jesee Legree led the FBS in yards and TDs through week seven.

== Personal life ==
A native of Fort Wayne, Indiana, Shephard attended Northrop High School before attending DePauw University. Shephard and his wife Hallie have three children.

== Head coaching record ==
Year	Team	Overall	Conference	Standing	Bowl/playoffs
Oregon State Beavers (Pac-12 Conference) (2026–present)
2026	Oregon State	6–5	4–3		
Oregon State:		6–5	4–3		
Total:		6–5			
