= 2026 Utah State Aggies football team =

American college football season

2026 Utah State Aggies football
- Conference: Pac-12 Conference
- Record: 4–7 (3–4 Pac-12)
- Head coach: Bronco Mendenhall (2nd season)
- Offensive coordinator: Robert Anae (1st season)
- Offensive scheme: Power spread
- Defensive coordinator: Nick Howell (2nd season)
- Base defense: 3–3–5
- Home stadium: Maverik Stadium

2026 Pac-12 Conference football standings
	Conf.			Overall
Team	W		L	W		L
No. 17 Boise State y	6	–	1	9	–	2
San Diego State y	5	–	2	6	–	5
Texas State	5	–	2	7	–	4
Oregon State	4	–	3	6	–	5
Utah State	3	–	4	4	–	7
Fresno State	3	–	4	6	–	5
Washington State	1	–	6	2	–	9
Colorado State	1	–	6	3	–	8
Championship: San Diego State at Boise State
y – Championship game participant; As of November 22, 2026; Rankings from CFP rankings

The 2026 Utah State Aggies football team represents Utah State University as a member of the Pac-12 Conference during the 2026 NCAA Division I FBS football season. The Aggies are led by second-year head coach Bronco Mendenhall and play their home games at Maverik Stadium, located in Logan, Utah.

This is the Aggies' first season in the Pac-12, after they spent 13 years in the Mountain West Conference for football.

== Offseason ==
=== Transfers ===
==== Outgoing ====
Player	Position	Destination
Noah Flores	CB	Arkansas State
Corey Thompson Jr.	WR	Ball State
Jr Sia	OL	BYU
Sampson Alofipo	LB	CSU Pueblo
Carl Nesmith	EDGE	Delaware State
Titan Saxton	S	Idaho State
William Holmes	EDGE	Illinois
Derrick Jameson	RB	Louisiana–Monroe
Zachary Robbins	P	Minnesota
Iverson Report	DT	Northeastern State
Camden Jury	OL	Northern Arizona
Gio Kafentzis	S	Portland State
John Gayer	EDGE	Robert Morris
Kaleb Mitchell	WR	Sam Houston
Tymere Burton	LB	Southeast Missouri State
E. J. Fisk	CB	Southeast Missouri State
Carlos Orr-Gillespie	WR	Tennessee State
Carter Brown	K	Tennessee Tech
Courage Ugochukwu	CB	UAB
Braden Pegan	WR	Utah
Abe Jager	CB	Utah Tech
CJ Tiller	QB	Utah Tech
Zion Andreasen	OLB	Weber State
Tate Kjar	WR	Weber State
Kone Aumua-Uiagalelei	DL	Unknown
Lawrence Falatea	EDGE	Unknown
Enoka Migao	EDGE	Unknown
Adam Pond	OL	Unknown
Tanner Rinker	K	Unknown

==== Incoming ====
Player	Position	Previous school
Rex Haynes	WR	Arizona
Quincy Wright	DL	Arkansas State
Collin Remenowsky	RB	Ashland
Seth Wilfred	OT	Auburn
Ronnie Mageo	DL	Baylor
McCae Hillstead	QB	BYU
Marcus McKenzie	CB	BYU
Harrison Taggart	LB	California
Kye Stokes	S	Cincinnati
Kian Afrookhteh	K	Coastal Carolina
Asher Cunningham	LB	Elon
Javon Robinson	TE	Georgia State
Adonis Jackson	EDGE	Mississippi Valley State
Taavili Tuitama	DL	New Mexico State
B.J. Diakite	EDGE	North Alabama
Antonio Bluiett	CB	North Dakota
David Kabongo	S	Oklahoma State
Sesi Vailahi	RB	Oklahoma State
Matthew Wade	OT	Oklahoma State
John Randle	OT	Purdue
Tyler Masdea	DL	Shippensburg
Jordan Pendleton	EDGE	St. Thomas (MN)
L.J. Johnson Jr.	WR	Texas State
Chapman Lewis	S	Texas Tech
Kasen Long	DL	Texas Tech
Jeremiah Holmes	EDGE	The Citadel
Steven Sannieniola	S	Vanderbilt
Grady Brosterhous	QB	Virginia
Eli Wood	WR	Virginia
James Jennette	DL	Virginia Tech
Kadin Lynch	IOL	William & Mary
Markie Grant	CB	Wyoming

=== Coaching staff additions ===
Name	Position	Previous Team	Previous Position	Source
Robert Anae	Offensive coordinator/Tight ends	NC State	Offensive coordinator	
De'Vante Cross	Cornerbacks	Utah Tech	Defensive backs	
Skyler Ridley	Wide receivers	Weber State	Assistant head coach/Special teams coordinator/Tight ends	
D. J. Tialavea	Senior offensive analyst/Assistant offensive line	Oklahoma State	Tight ends	

== Schedule ==
Date	Time	Opponent	Site	TV	Result	Attendance
September 5	5:00 p.m.	No. 23 (FCS) Idaho State*	Maverik Stadium; Logan, UT	CBSSN	L 17–29	20,723
September 12	1:30 p.m.	at No. 19 Washington*	Husky Stadium; Seattle, WA	BTN	L 14–16	62,152
September 19	1:30 p.m.	at No. 17 Utah*	Rice–Eccles Stadium; Salt Lake City, UT (Battle of the Brothers)	FOX	L 0–33	51,455
September 26	5:30 p.m.	Troy*	Maverik Stadium; Logan, UT	CBSSN	W 21–10	22,037
October 3	5:30 p.m.	at No. 22 Boise State	Albertsons Stadium; Boise, ID	CBSSN	L 18–37	34,616
October 9	7:00 p.m.	Washington State	Maverik Stadium; Logan, UT	The CW	W 17–16	20,806
October 24	5:30 p.m.	at Texas State	UFCU Stadium; San Marcos, TX	CBSSN	L 17–20	18,587
October 31	1:30 p.m.	Colorado State	Maverik Stadium; Logan, UT	USA	W 31–14	15,835
November 7	7:30 p.m.	Fresno State	Maverik Stadium; Logan, UT	USA	W 17–10	17,082
November 14	6:30 p.m.	at San Diego State	Snapdragon Stadium; San Diego, CA	USA	L 13–30	21,231
November 21	8:30 p.m.	at Oregon State	Reser Stadium; Corvallis, OR	CBSSN	L 24–31	34,359
November 28		Texas State (Note: In the 2026 season, the Pac-12 will use a "flex" scheduling model for Week 13. After the round-robin conference schedule, the conference will determine the pairings for Week 13. "Flex" games will not count in the conference standings.)*	Maverik Stadium; Logan, UT			
*Non-conference game; Rankings from AP Poll (and CFP Rankings, after November 3) – Released prior to game; All times are in Mountain time

== Personnel ==
2026 Utah State Aggies football team roster
Players
Coaches
Offense

Pos.	#	Name	Class
WR	6	Demick Starling	GS
RB	8	Javen Jacobs	Sr
WR	1	Anthony Garcia	Jr
WR	15	Ty Olsen	Fr
TE	18	Kache Kaio	Jr
RB	23	Noah White	So
RB	25	Ravian Larry	Fr
RB	26	Tre Kofe	So
RB	28	Nehemiah Washington	Fr
OL	51	Kauasi Hansen	Fr
OL	54	Jackson Nelson	So
OL	55	Jimmy Liston	Jr
OL	59	Cole Keele	Jr
OL	61	K'leyone Iosua	Jr
OL	65	Tavo Motu'apuaka	Sr
OL	72	George Maile	Sr
OL	77	Jared Smith	Fr
WR	4	Nikko Boncore	Fr
QB	9	Grady Brosterhous	GS
QB		Crew Cacciacarne	Fr
RB		Brevin Egbert	Fr
TE		Alex Faiivae	Fr
WR	5	Rex Haynes	Jr
QB	2	McCae Hillstead	Jr
WR		Charlie Holbrook	Fr
WR		LJ Johnson Jr.	So
QB		Kaleb Maryland	Fr
TE		Preston McDaniel	Fr
TE		Jude Nelson	Fr
OL		John Randle Jr.	So
TE		Collin Remenowksy	Sr
WR		Javon Robinson	Sr
RB	10	Sesi Vailahi	Jr
OL		Chewy Wade	So
OL		Seth Wilfred	Jr
WR	7	Eli Wood	GS
OL		Joshua Zent	Fr
QB	3	Jacob Conover	GS
WR	17	Cade Baker	So
TE	19	Chase Tuatagaloa	Jr
OL	53	Jarvis Griffiths	So
OL	57	Trey Andersen	Sr
OL	67	Adam Pond	Jr
OL	73	Elia Migao	Sr
TE	83	Josh Sterzer	GS
OL		Sam Brousseau	Fr
QB		Kaden Cox	Fr
TE		Kyle Lively	Fr
WR		Jackson Olsen	So
OL		Jared Pele	Sr
RB		Clyde Taulapapa	Fr
OL		Caysen Whittaker	Fr

Defense

Pos.	#	Name	Class
S	4	Brevin Hamblin	Sr
DT	9	Tyree Morris	Sr
CB	11	Bryson Taylor	GS
CB	7	Bobby Arnold	Sr
ILB	14	Bronson Olevao Jr.	Sr
CB	15	D'Angelo Mayes	Jr
S	16	Lava Vailahi	Fr
ILB	17	Mataira Brown	Jr
OLB	25	Chris Joe	So
S	26	D'Andre Barnes	Jr
OLB	27	Blake Barnes	So
S	27	Chika Ebunoha	Sr
DT	28	Carson Tujague	So
ILB	31	Dakota Howell	So
S	3	Charger Doty	So
ILB	6	Luke Durfey	So
CB	38	John Shepard	Jr
ILB	45	Diego Grateron	Jr
S	46	Breaker Mendenhall	Jr
OLB	55	Tevita Tuha	Sr
DT	92	Joshua Papu	So
DT	93	Tanner Jolley	Jr
DT	95	Paxton Naegle	Fr
DT	98	Bryan Vogl	Jr
DT		Tiki Bell	Fr
CB		Antonio Bluiett	Sr
ILB		Asher Cunningham	Jr
OLB		Brody Flores	Fr
CB	5	Markie Grant	So
OLB		Jeremiah Holmes	Sr
OLB		Adonis Jackson	Sr
OLB		James Jennette	GS
S	8	David Kabongo	So
S		Chapman Lewis	Jr
DE		Kasen Long	So
DT		Ronnie Mageo	Sr
ILB		Jordan Pendleton	Sr
OLB		Fisher Pyne	Fr
CB		Kye Stokes	Sr
ILB	0	Harrison Taggart	Sr
DT		Ta'avili Tuitama	Sr
DT		Quincy Wright	Sr
CB	30	Jack Hadfield	Fr
OLB	42	Nu'uletau Sellesin	Sr
DT	94	Kone Aumua-Uiagalelei	Jr
ILB		Sampson Alofipo	Jr
S		Jonathan Baird	Jr
ILB		Ryker Lotulelei	Fr
ILB		Beau McGiven	Fr
DT		Stockton Pyne	Fr

Special teams

Pos.	#	Name	Class
LS	13	Hyrum Hatch	Jr
P	3	Landon Rehkow	Jr
P	37	Dylan Sprague	Sr
LS	43	Owen Edwards	So
K		Kian Afrookhteh	Sr
K		Tyler Haley	So
P		Odhran Kenny	So

Head coach

- Bronco Mendenhall

Coordinators/assistant coaches

- Robert Anae – Offensive coordinator/tight ends
- Nick Howell – Defensive coordinator/safeties
- Shane Hunter – Special teams coordinator/linebackers
- Mario Acitelli – Offensive line/run game coordinator
- Kirk Garner – Running backs
- Matt Johns – Quarterbacks
- Jan Jorgensen – Outside linebackers
- Donte Wilkins – Defensive line
- De'Vante Cross – Cornerbacks
- Skyler Ridley – Wide receivers
- Kody Cooke – Head strength coach
- D. J. Tialavea – Senior offensive analyst/assistant offensive line
- Austin Gatewood – Senior defensive analyst
- Christopher Howell – Defensive analyst
- Michael Frisina – Special teams analyst
- Josh Clifford – Junior analyst/skill assistant
- Jray Galeai – Junior defensive analyst
- Stine Emrick – Assistant strength coach
- Kevin Griffin – Assistant strength coach
- Hayden Millie – Assistant strength coach

Legend

- (C) Team captain
- (S) Suspended
- (I) Ineligible
- Injured
- Redshirt

Roster
Last update: 06/03/26

== Game summaries ==
=== No. 23 (FCS) Idaho State ===
No. 23 (FCS) Idaho State Bengals (1–0) at Utah State Aggies (0–0) – Game summary

Quarter	1	2	3	4	Total
No. 23 (FCS) Bengals	6	10	3	10	29
Aggies	7	3	7	0	17

at Maverik Stadium • Logan, Utah

- Date: September 5
- Game time: 5:00 p.m.
- Game weather: Sunny • Temperature: 83 °F (28 °C)
- Game attendance: 20,723
- Referee: Chris Wiggins
- TV announcers (CBSSN): Jordan Kent, Robert Turbin, and Hailey Sutton

Game information

First quarter

- IDST – Mason Lindberg 38-yard field goal, 9:04. Bengals 3–0. Drive: 14 plays, 64 yards, 5:56.
- USU – Eli Wood 15-yard pass from McCae Hillstead (Kian Afrookhteh kick), 5:52. Aggies 7–3. Drive: 8 plays, 75 yards, 3:12.
- IDST – Mason Lindberg 48-yard field goal, 1:57. Aggies 7–6. Drive: 9 plays, 44 yards, 3:55.

Second quarter

- IDST – Jordan Cooke 1-yard run (Mason Lindberg kick), 8:23. Bengals 13–7. Drive: 11 plays, 71 yards, 5:00.
- IDST – Mason Lindberg 25-yard field goal, 6:42. Bengals 16–7. Drive: 4 plays, -3 yards, 1:21.
- USU – Kian Afrookhteh 28-yard field goal, 0:04. Bengals 16–10. Drive: 16 plays, 67 yards, 4:14.

Third quarter

- USU – Demick Starling 4-yard pass from McCae Hillstead (Kian Afrookhteh kick), 4:39. Aggies 17–16. Drive: 4 plays, 24 yards, 1:07.
- IDST – Mason Lindberg 43-yard field goal, 0:26. Bengals 19–17. Drive: 9 plays, 49 yards, 3:13.

Fourth quarter

- IDST – Chedon James 8-yard pass from Jordan Cooke (Mason Lindberg kick), 14:13. Bengals 26–17. Drive: 3 plays, 3 yards, 1:06.
- IDST – Mason Lindberg 41-yard field goal, 4:39. Bengals 29–17. Drive: 4 plays, 24 yards, 1:40.

Statistics	IDST	USU
First downs	14	29
Plays–yards	63–241	88–407
Rushes–yards	30–89	44–162
Passing yards	152	245
Passing: comp–att–int	18–33–0	20–44–4
Turnovers	0	4
Time of possession	26:27	33:33

Team	Category	Player	Statistics
Idaho State	Passing	Jordan Cooke	18/33, 152 yards, TD
Idaho State	Rushing	Carson Sudbury	3 carries, 37 yards
Idaho State	Receiving	Julian Mason	7 receptions, 75 yards
Utah State	Passing	McCae Hillstead	15/30, 178 yards, 2 TD, 3 INT
Utah State	Rushing	Javen Jacobs	20 carries, 80 yards
Utah State	Receiving	Eli Wood	6 receptions, 90 yards

=== at No. 19 Washington ===
Utah State Aggies (0–1) at No. 19 Washington Huskies (1–0) – Game summary

Quarter	1	2	3	4	Total
Aggies	0	7	0	7	14
No. 19 Huskies	0	10	0	6	16

at Husky Stadium • Seattle, Washington

- Date: September 12
- Game time: 1:30 p.m. MDT
- Game weather: Cloudy • Temperature: 66 °F (19 °C)
- Game attendance: 62,152
- Referee: Matthew Richards
- TV announcers (BTN): A.J. Kanell, Marcel Reece, and Alyssa Charlston-Smith

Game information

First quarter

- No scoring plays

Second quarter

- WASH – Tyler Robles 30-yard field goal, 11:35. Huskies 3–0. Drive: 9 plays, 43 yards, 3:29.
- USU – Javon Robinson 78-yard pass from Grady Brosterhous (Kian Afrookhteh kick), 11:19. Aggies 7–3. Drive: 1 play, 78 yards, 0:11.
- WASH – Ansu Sanoe 1-yard run (Tyler Robles kick), 6:41. Huskies 10–7. Drive: 8 plays, 65 yards, 4:38.

Third quarter

- No scoring plays

Fourth quarter

- WASH – Tyler Robles 26-yard field goal, 12:54. Huskies 13–7. Drive: 7 plays, 51 yards, 2:12.
- WASH – Tyler Robles 43-yard field goal, 6:28. Huskies 16–7. Drive: 7 plays, 19 yards, 3:20.
- USU – Eli Wood 7-yard pass from Grady Brosterhous (Kian Afrookhteh kick), 1:50. Huskies 16–14. Drive: 13 plays, 75 yards, 4:38.

Statistics	USU	WASH
First downs	14	18
Plays–yards	58–271	74–356
Rushes–yards	29–75	33–107
Passing yards	196	249
Passing: comp–att–int	17–29–3	26–41–0
Turnovers	3	0
Time of possession	24:55	35:05

Team	Category	Player	Statistics
Utah State	Passing	Grady Brosterhaus	17/28, 196 yards, 2 TD, 3 INT
Utah State	Rushing	Grady Brosterhaus	21 carries, 81 yards
Utah State	Receiving	Javon Robinson	3 receptions, 100 yards, TD
Washington	Passing	Demond Williams Jr.	26/41, 249 yards
Washington	Rushing	Demond Williams Jr.	11 carries, 56 yards
Washington	Receiving	Dezmen Roebuck	7 receptions, 59 yards

=== at No. 17 Utah (Battle of the Brothers) ===
Utah State Aggies (0–2) at No. 17 Utah Utes (2–0) – Game summary

Quarter	1	2	3	4	Total
Aggies	0	0	0	0	0
No. 17 Utes	16	10	7	0	33

at Rice–Eccles Stadium • Salt Lake City, Utah

- Date: September 19
- Game time: 1:43 p.m.
- Game weather: Cloudy • Temperature: 68 °F (20 °C) • Wind: W at 7 miles per hour (11 km/h)
- Game attendance: 51,455
- Referee: Gary Reed
- TV announcers (FOX): Dan Hellie and Robert Smith

Game information

First quarter

- UTAH - Braden Pegan 28-yard pass from Devon Dampier (Dillon Curtis kick), 10:37. Utes 7-0. Drive: 9 plays, 75 yards, 4:23.
- UTAH - Byrd Ficklin 9-yard run (Two-point run conversion failed), 5:38. Utes 13-0. Drive: 7 plays, 75 yards, 3:02.
- UTAH - Dillon Curtis 36-yard field goal, 0:04. Utes 16-0. Drive: 9 plays, 57 yards, 4:41.

Second quarter

- UTAH - Dillon Curtis 54-yard field goal, 4:48. Utes 19-0. Drive: 13 plays, 63 yards, 5:35.
- UTAH - Braden Pegan 37-yard pass from Devon Dampier (Dillon Curtis kick), 0:33. Utes 26-0. Drive: 3 plays, 39 yards, 0:21.

Third quarter

- UTAH - Daniel Bray 63-yard run (Dillon Curtis kick), 5:16. Utes 33-0. Drive: 4 plays, 80 yards, 1:48.

Fourth quarter

- No scoring plays

Statistics	USU	UTAH
First downs	10	23
Plays–yards	54–188	74–480
Rushes–yards	25–58	37–194
Passing yards	130	286
Passing: comp–att–int	15–29–1	25–37–0
Turnovers	1	1
Time of possession	24:46	35:14

Team	Category	Player	Statistics
Utah State	Passing	Grady Brosterhous	15/29, 130 yards, INT
Utah State	Rushing	Javen Jacobs	5 carries, 31 yards
Utah State	Receiving	Eli Wood	4 receptions, 41 yards
Utah	Passing	Devon Dampier	22/32, 253 yards, 2 TD
Utah	Rushing	Daniel Bray	3 carries, 82 yards, TD
Utah	Receiving	Braden Pegan	8 receptions, 122 yards, 2 TD

=== Troy ===
Troy Trojans (2–1) at Utah State Aggies (0–3) – Game summary

Quarter	1	2	3	4	Total
Trojans	7	3	0	0	10
Aggies	7	0	14	0	21

at Maverik Stadium • Logan, Utah

- Date: September 26
- Game time: 5:30 p.m. MDT
- Game weather: Sunny
- Game attendance: 22,037
- Referee: Chris Snead
- TV announcers (CBSSN): Jordan Kent, Doug Pederson and Brandon Baylor

Game information

First quarter

- USU - Javon Robinson 57-yard pass from Grady Brosterhous (Kian Afrookhteh kick), 13:46. Aggies 7-0. Drive: 1 play, 57 yards, 0:11.
- TROY - Howard Kinchen 13-yard pass from Goose Crowder (Ethan Head kick), 7:56. Tied 7-7. Drive: 11 plays, 75 yards, 5:48.

Second quarter

- TROY - Ethan Head 45-yard field goal, 10:24. Trojans 10-7. Drive: 7 plays, 53 yards, 3:22.

Third quarter

- USU - Eli Wood 5-yard pass from Grady Brosterhous (Kian Afrookhteh kick), 11:02. Aggies 14-10. Drive: 9 plays, 75 yards, 3:58.
- USU - Javen Jacobs 6-yard run (Kian Afrookhteh kick), 4:51. Aggies 21-10. Drive: 6 plays, 80 yards, 3:09.

Fourth quarter

No scoring plays

Statistics	TROY	USU
First downs	26	19
Plays–yards	80–395	59–413
Rushes–yards	31–169	31–171
Passing yards	226	242
Passing: comp–att–int	25–49–3	18–28–1
Time of possession	34:16	25:42

Team	Category	Player	Statistics
Troy	Passing	Goose Crowder	25/49, 226 yards, TD, 3 INT
Troy	Rushing	Gavin Griffin	11 carries, 66 yards
Troy	Receiving	Noreel White	6 receptions, 75 yards
Utah State	Passing	Grady Brosterhous	18/28, 242 yards, 2 TD, INT
Utah State	Rushing	Grady Brosterhous	15 carries, 89 yards
Utah State	Receiving	Eli Wood	7 receptions, 96 yards, TD

=== at No. 22 Boise State ===
Utah State Aggies (1–3) at No. 22 Boise State Broncos (3–1) – Game summary

Quarter	1	2	3	4	Total
Aggies	0	10	0	8	18
No. 22 Broncos	14	14	3	6	37

at Albertsons Stadium • Boise, Idaho

- Date: October 3
- Game time: 5:30 p.m. MDT
- Game weather: Sunny • Temperature: 86 °F (30 °C) • Wind: SW at 3 miles per hour (4.8 km/h)
- Game attendance: 34,616
- Referee: Preston Clipper
- TV announcers (CBSSN): Jordan Kent, Doug Pederson, and Brandon Baylor

Game information

First quarter

- (8:17) BOIS – Dylan Riley 5-yard run, Canaan Moore kick (Drive: 6 plays, 89 yards, 2:51; Boise State 7–0)
- (0:19) BOIS – Matt Wagner 11-yard pass from Maddux Madsen, Canaan Moore kick (Drive: 12 plays, 70 yards, 6:09; Boise State 14–0)

Second quarter

- (8:45) BOIS – Dylan Riley 33-yard run, Canaan Moore kick (Drive: 9 plays, 78 yards, 5:11; Boise State 21–0)
- (5:52) USU – Javen Jacobs 1-yard pass from Grady Brosterhous, Kian Afrookhteh kick (Drive: 6 plays, 75 yards, 2:53; Boise State 21–7)
- (1:53) BOIS – Jake Ripp 21-yard interception, Canaan Moore kick (Boise State 28–7)
- (0:00) USU – Kian Afrookhteh 28-yard field goal (Drive: 7 plays, 65 yards, 1:53; Boise State 28–10)

Third quarter

- (8:22) BOIS – Canaan Moore 43-yard field goal (Drive: 12 plays, 49 yards, 6:38; Boise State 31–10)

Fourth quarter

- (9:32) USU – Eli Wood 31-yard pass from Grady Brosterhous, Kian Afrookhteh kick (Drive: 2 plays, 30 yards, 0:41; Boise State 31–18)
- (8:27) BOIS – Ben Ford 11-yard pass from Maddux Madsen (Drive: 3 plays, 75 yards, 1:05; Boise State 37–18)

Statistics	USU	BOIS
First downs	15	20
Plays–yards	58–345	62–429
Rushes–yards	33–169	41–185
Passing yards	175	244
Passing: comp–att–int	14–25–1	17–21–0
Time of possession	27:46	32:14

Team	Category	Player	Statistics
Utah State	Passing	Grady Brosterhous	12/18, 129 yards, 2 TD
Utah State	Rushing	Javen Jacobs	10 carries, 139 yards
Utah State	Receiving	Eli Wood	7 receptions, 102 yards, TD
Boise State	Passing	Maddux Madsen	17/21, 244 yards, 2 TD
Boise State	Rushing	Dylan Riley	18 carries, 93 yards, 2 TD
Boise State	Receiving	Rasean Jones	5 receptions, 88 yards

=== Washington State ===
Washington State Cougars (1–4) at Utah State Aggies (1–4) – Game summary

Quarter	1	2	3	4	Total
Cougars	6	10	0	0	16
Aggies	0	3	7	7	17

at Maverik Stadium • Logan, Utah

- Date: October 9
- Game time: 7:00 p.m. MDT
- Game weather: Clear
- Game attendance: 20,806
- Referee: Chris Snead
- TV announcers (The CW): Chris Fisher, Isaiah Stanback and Bryan Walters

Game information

First quarter

- WSU - Jack Stevens 40-yard field goal, 13:26. Cougars 3-0. Drive: 4 plays, 3 yards, 1:31.
- WSU - Jack Stevens 43-yard field goal, 1:02. Cougars 6-0. Drive: 15 plays, 54 yards, 9:20.

Second quarter

- USU - Kian Afrookhteh 48-yard field goal, 14:38. Cougars 6-3. Drive: 7 plays, 35 yards, 1:24.
- WSU - Jack Stevens 50-yard field, 11:10. Cougars 9-3. Drive: 8 plays, 43 yards, 3:28.
- WSU - Leo Pulalasi 54-yard run (Jack Stevens kick), 3:32. Cougars 16-3. Drive: 4 plays, 53 yards, 2:17.

Third quarter

- USU - Eli Wood 27-yard pass from Grady Brosterhous (Kian Afrookhteh kick), 7:08. Cougars 16-10. Drive: 5 plays, 39 yards, 1:51.

Fourth quarter

- USU - Javen Jacobs 2-yard run (Kian Afrookhteh kick), 6:22. Aggies 17-16. Drive: 3 plays, 19 yards, 1:33.

Statistics	WSU	USU
First downs	15	11
Plays–yards	68–257	56–236
Rushes–yards	32–101	30–86
Passing yards	156	150
Passing: comp–att–int	23–36–0	11–26–0
Time of possession	35:40	24:20

Team	Category	Player	Statistics
Washington State	Passing	Caden Pinnick	23/36, 156 yards
Washington State	Rushing	Leo Pulalasi	8 carries, 60 yards, TD
Washington State	Receiving	Trey Leckner	4 receptions, 34 yards
Utah State	Passing	Grady Brosterhous	11/26, 150 yards, TD
Utah State	Rushing	Javen Jacobs	15 carries, 62 yards, TD
Utah State	Receiving	Eli Wood	6 receptions, 84 yards, TD

=== at Texas State ===
Utah State Aggies (2–4) at Texas State Bobcats (3–3) – Game summary

Quarter	1	2	3	4	Total
Aggies	6	3	0	8	17
Bobcats	7	0	7	6	20

at UFCU Stadium • San Marcos, Texas

- Date: October 24
- Game time: 5:30 p.m. MDT
- Referee: John Love
- TV: CBSSN

Statistics	USU	TXST
First downs		
Plays–yards		
Rushes–yards		
Passing yards		
Passing: comp–att–int		
Time of possession		

Team	Category	Player	Statistics
Utah State	Passing		
Utah State	Rushing		
Utah State	Receiving		
Texas State	Passing		
Texas State	Rushing		
Texas State	Receiving		

=== Colorado State ===
Colorado State Rams (3–4) at Utah State Aggies (2–5) – Game summary

Quarter	1	2	3	4	Total
Rams	0	0	6	8	14
Aggies	10	7	7	7	31

at Maverik Stadium • Logan, Utah

- Date: October 31
- Game time: 1:30 p.m. MDT
- TV: USA

Statistics	CSU	USU
First downs		
Plays–yards		
Rushes–yards		
Passing yards		
Passing: comp–att–int		
Time of possession		

Team	Category	Player	Statistics
Colorado State	Passing		
Colorado State	Rushing		
Colorado State	Receiving		
Utah State	Passing		
Utah State	Rushing		
Utah State	Receiving		

=== Fresno State ===
Fresno State Bulldogs (5–3) at Utah State Aggies (3–5) – Game summary

Quarter	1	2	3	4	Total
Bulldogs	0	0	3	7	10
Aggies	0	14	0	3	17

at Maverik Stadium • Logan, Utah

- Date: November 7
- Game time: 7:30 p.m. MST
- TV: USA

Statistics	FRES	USU
First downs		
Plays–yards		
Rushes–yards		
Passing yards		
Passing: comp–att–int		
Time of possession		

Team	Category	Player	Statistics
Fresno State	Passing		
Fresno State	Rushing		
Fresno State	Receiving		
Utah State	Passing		
Utah State	Rushing		
Utah State	Receiving		

=== at San Diego State ===
Utah State Aggies (4–5) at San Diego State Aztecs (4–5) – Game summary

Quarter	1	2	3	4	Total
Aggies	7	0	0	6	13
Aztecs	3	7	10	10	30

at Snapdragon Stadium • San Diego, California

- Date: November 14
- Game time: 6:30 p.m. MST
- TV: USA

Statistics	USU	SDSU
First downs		
Plays–yards		
Rushes–yards		
Passing yards		
Passing: comp–att–int		
Time of possession		

Team	Category	Player	Statistics
Utah State	Passing		
Utah State	Rushing		
Utah State	Receiving		
San Diego State	Passing		
San Diego State	Rushing		
San Diego State	Receiving		

=== at Oregon State ===
Utah State Aggies (4–6) at Oregon State Beavers (5–5) – Game summary

Quarter	1	2	3	4	Total
Aggies	7	10	0	7	24
Beavers	0	10	7	14	31

at Reser Stadium • Corvallis, Oregon

- Date: November 21
- Game time: 8:30 p.m. MST
- TV: CBSSN

Statistics	USU	ORST
First downs		
Plays–yards		
Rushes–yards		
Passing yards		
Passing: comp–att–int		
Time of possession		

Team	Category	Player	Statistics
Utah State	Passing		
Utah State	Rushing		
Utah State	Receiving		
Oregon State	Passing		
Oregon State	Rushing		
Oregon State	Receiving		

=== Pac-12 opponent TBA ===
Pac-12 opponent TBA at Utah State Aggies (0–0) – Game summary

Quarter	1	2	3	4	Total
TBA	0	0	0	0	0
Aggies	0	0	0	0	0

at Maverik Stadium • Logan, Utah

- Date: November 28
- Game time: TBD

Statistics	TBA	USU
First downs		
Plays–yards		
Rushes–yards		
Passing yards		
Passing: comp–att–int		
Time of possession		

Team	Category	Player	Statistics
Pac-12 opponent TBA	Passing		
Pac-12 opponent TBA	Rushing		
Pac-12 opponent TBA	Receiving		
Utah State	Passing		
Utah State	Rushing		
Utah State	Receiving		
