= Norman North High School =

Coordinates: 35.243975°N 97.448373°W

Location
- 1809 Stubbeman Avenue; Norman, Oklahoma 73069; United States

Information
- Type: Co-educational, public, secondary
- Established: 1997
- School district: Norman Public Schools
- Principal: Kimberly Garrett
- Teaching staff: 119.55 (on an FTE basis)
- Enrollment: 2,369 (2023–2024)
- Student to teacher ratio: 19.82
- Colors: Silver, hunter green, black
- Nickname: Timberwolves
- Website: Norman North High School home page

Norman North High School is a public, co-educational secondary school in Norman, Oklahoma, United States. It was established on August 21, 1997, on the grounds of what had been Longfellow Middle School since 1972. Longfellow has since been relocated to the building that once was Central Mid-High.

== Notable alumni ==
- Alpharad, YouTube personality/comedian
- Mauro Cichero, professional soccer player, currently playing for the Forward Madison FC
- Owen Eshelman, college football player for the Washington State Cougars
- Jordan Evans, former professional football player, played for the Cincinnati Bengals
- Ray William Johnson, Internet personality
- Owen Joyner, actor
- Charlie Kolar, professional football player for the Los Angeles Chargers
- Drake Stoops, professional football player for the Dallas Renegades
- Lindy Waters III, professional basketball player for the San Antonio Spurs
- Trae Young, professional basketball player for the Washington Wizards, former First-Team All-American, 2024–25 NBA season NBA assists leader
- Christopher Bell, professional stock car driver for the #20 Joe Gibbs Racing Toyota
