= McCae Hillstead =

American football player (born 2004)

No. 2 – Utah State Aggies
- Position: Quarterback
- Class: Redshirt Junior

Personal information
- Born: August 25, 2004 (age 22)
- Listed height: 5 ft 10 in (1.78 m)
- Listed weight: 190 lb (86 kg)

Career information
- High school: Skyridge (Lehi, Utah)
- College: Utah State (2023); BYU (2024–2025); Utah State (2026–present)
- Stats at ESPN

McCae Hillstead (born August 25, 2004) is an American college football quarterback for the Utah State Aggies. He previously played for the BYU Cougars.

== Early life ==
Hillstead attended Skyridge High School located in Lehi, Utah. Coming out of high school, he was rated as a three star recruit and the top quarterback in the State of Utah, where he committed to play college football for the Utah State Aggies.

== College career ==
=== Utah State (first stint) ===
In week three of the 2023 season, he entered the game after starter Cooper Legas was benched, where he completed 18 of his 27 pass attempts for 202 yards and three touchdowns in a loss to Air Force. In week four, Hillstead made his first collegiate start completing 25 of his 47 passes for 399 yards and four touchdowns versus James Madison. He finished the 2023 season completing 59.5% of his passes for 1,062 yards and 11 touchdowns along with eight interceptions. After the conclusion of the 2023 season, Hillstead decided to enter his name into the NCAA transfer portal.

=== BYU ===
Hillstead transferred to play for the BYU Cougars. During his first season with the Cougars in 2024, he used the season to redshirt. Heading into the 2025 season, after starting quarterback Jake Retzlaff was suspended and entered the transfer portal, Hillstead was the favorite to start for the Cougars. However, he was beat out by true freshmen Bear Bachmeier. Hillstead made his Cougars debut in the season opener against Portland State, where he attempted his only passes of the season, completing four of five attempts for 33 yards, and added 23 rushing yards in the victory. He appeared in five games during the season, including the 2025 Pop-Tarts Bowl victory over Georgia Tech. Hillstead entered the NCAA transfer portal on December 29, 2025.

=== Utah State (second stint) ===
On January 8, 2026, Hillstead returned to Utah State under second-year head coach Bronco Mendenhall. He was named the Aggies' starting quarterback entering the 2026 season.

=== College statistics ===
Year	Team	Games			Passing								Rushing			
Year	Team	GP	GS	Record	Cmp	Att	Pct	Yds	Y/A	TD	Int	Rtg	Att	Yds	Avg	TD
2023	Utah State	8	4	2–2	94	158	59.5	1,062	6.7	11	8	128.8	44	36	0.8	0
2024	BYU	0	0	—	Redshirted (redshirt)											
2025	BYU	5	0	—	4	5	80.0	33	6.6	0	0	135.4	5	28	5.6	0
2026	Utah State	4	3	2–1	43	73	58.9	515	7.1	3	4	120.8	38	188	4.9	2
Career		17	7	4−3	141	236	59.7	1,610	6.8	14	12	126.5	87	252	2.9	2
