= Skyridge High School =

Location
- 3000 N Center St; Lehi, Utah, 84043; United States; 40.426078°N 111.848109°W

Information
- Type: State school
- Established: August 2016
- School district: Alpine School District
- Principal: John Wallwork
- Teaching staff: 160 (2023-24)
- Grades: 10-12
- Enrollment: 2,469 (2023-2024)
- Campus size: 70.5 acres
- Colors: Burnt Orange; Steel Gray
- Mascot: Flash the Falcon
- Team name: Falcons
- Rival: Corner Canyon High School Lone Peak High School Lehi High School
- Graduation Rate: 93% (2021-2022)
- Website: shs.alpineschools.org

Skyridge High School is a high school in Lehi, Utah, United States. The school opened in August 2016. Skyridge High's mascot is a falcon named Flash, and their colors are burnt orange and steel gray.

== History ==
Skyridge was funded as a part of a bond for Alpine School District in 2011. The groundbreaking for the school was in 2014.

The school received a grant in 2015 to build a driver's education range.

== Athletics ==
Skyridge competes in Region 4 of classification 6A under the Utah High School Activities Association. The school participates in the following sports:

- Baseball (boys)
- Basketball (girls & boys)
- Competitive Cheer (girls & boys)
- Cross Country (girls & boys)
- Drill Team (girls)
- Football (boys)
- Marching Band
- Golf (girls & boys)
- Lacrosse (girls & boys)
- Softball (girls)
- Soccer (girls & boys)
- Swimming (girls & boys)
- Tennis (girls & boys)
- Track & Field (girls & boys)
- Volleyball (girls)
- Wrestling (girls & boys)

The school has won State Championships in the following sports:

Competitive Cheer (2023)

Boys Cross Country (2020)

Football (2022)

Boys Swimming (2023, 2024)

Girls Tennis (2020, 2021, 2022, 2023, 2024)

Girls Volleyball (2018)

Boys Lacrosse (2026)

== Notable alumni ==
- McCae Hillstead, college football player
- Patrick Hoopes, college gymnast.
- Smith Snowden, college football player

== See also ==
- List of high schools in Utah
