= Jesse Legree =

American football player

No. 12 – Oregon State Beavers
- Position: Wide receiver
- Class: Freshman

Personal information
- Born: Watertown, New York, U.S.
- Listed height: 5 ft 10 in (1.78 m)
- Listed weight: 172 lb (78 kg)

Career information
- High school: Saint Frances Academy (Baltimore, Maryland)
- College: Oregon State (2026–present)
- Stats at ESPN

Jesse Legree is an American college football wide receiver for the Oregon State Beavers.

== Early life ==
Legree was born in Watertown, New York. He initially attended Loyola Blakefield High School in Towson, Maryland before transferring to Saint Frances Academy in Baltimore, Maryland for his senior year. He played at defensive back and wide receiver with 721 all-purpose yards and six touchdowns as a senior. Legree also had four interceptions and six pass breakups on defense. As a three-star recruit, he committed to play college football at Oregon State University late in the process.

== College career ==
In his first game, Legree had five catches for 136 yards and one touchdown against Houston. He was named Pac-12 freshman of the week for having the most receiving yards by any freshman (and any player) in Week 1 and had the longest reception (71 yards) by an Oregon State receiver since 2023. In just his second career game, Legree had 8 catches for 240 yards, the most by a freshman since Xavier Worthy in 2021 and the second highest single-game total in school history. The following week, he had four catches for 100 yards and became the first Beavers receiver since Brandin Cooks to have three consecutive 100-yard games.

Legree continued this torrid pace, racking up seven straight 100-yard games to go along with a Pac-12 record seven straight Freshman of the Week honors. Through seven games, he led the FBS with 1,040 yards receiving and 14 touchdowns contributing to the Beavers posting a 5-2 record before their bye week, a dramatic improvement on the previous season’s 2-10 overall record. This success generated speculation as to whether Oregon State would be able to retain Legree for next season. On October 23, 2026, Legree quelled rumors by announcing mid-season that he would be staying at Oregon State for the 2027 season. Then, on November 2, 2026, Oregon State announced that Legree and teammate Braden Atkinson signed with Nike’s Blue Ribbon Elite NIL program.

== Statistics ==
=== College ===
Year	Team	Games		Receiving			
Year	Team	GP	GS	Rec	Yds	Avg	TD
2026	Oregon State	11	10	78	1418	18.2	15
Career		11	10	78	1418	18.2	15

== Personal life ==
Legree's brother, Josiah, is a college basketball player and has played for Indiana State, Morehead State, and UTSA. Their father, Jeffrey, coaches girls basketball and aids Saint Frances' football team in mental health and player development.
