= Owen Eshelman =

American football player

No. 17 – Washington State Cougars
- Position: Quarterback
- Class: Redshirt Freshman

Personal information
- Listed height: 6 ft 3 in (1.91 m)
- Listed weight: 204 lb (93 kg)

Career information
- High school: Norman North (Norman, Oklahoma)
- College: Washington State (2025–present)
- Stats at ESPN

Owen Eshelman is an American college football quarterback for the Washington State Cougars.

== Early life ==
Eshelman attended Norman North High School in Norman, Oklahoma. A two-year starter at quarterback, he passed for 2,279 yards with 24 touchdowns his junior year and 2,507 yards with 29 touchdowns his senior year. He also rushed for 568 yards with seven touchdowns as a junior and 1,312 yards with 19 touchdowns his senior year. Eshelman originally committed to play college football at South Dakota State University before flipping his commitment to Washington State University.

== College career ==
After redshirting his first year at Washington State in 2025, Eshelman started 2026 as a backup to Caden Pinnick. After six games as a backup, he was named the starting quarterback against the Oregon State Beavers. He completed 32 of 49 passes for 289 yards with two touchdowns, one interception and rushed 15 times for 136 yards with a touchdown.
