= Braden Atkinson =

American football player

No. 2 – Oregon State Beavers
- Position: Quarterback
- Class: Sophomore

Personal information
- Born: Raleigh, North Carolina, U.S.
- Listed height: 6 ft 1 in (1.85 m)
- Listed weight: 210 lb (95 kg)

Career information
- High school: Rolesville (Rolesville, North Carolina)
- College: Mercer (2025); Oregon State (2026–present)

Awards and highlights
- Jerry Rice Award (2025); Second-team All-SoCon (2025); Freshman All-SoCon (2025); SoCon Freshman of the Year (2025)
- Stats at ESPN

Braden Atkinson is an American college football quarterback for the Oregon State Beavers. He previously played for the Mercer Bears.

== Early life ==
Atkinson attended Rolesville High School in Rolesville, North Carolina. He passed for 3,701 yards with 46 touchdowns as a junior and 3,925 yards with 53 touchdowns as a senior.

== College career ==
=== Mercer ===
Atkinson entered his true freshman year at Mercer as a backup and after two games was named the starter. Against the VMI Keydets he set the school record for passing yards in a game with 538. During the season, he set school records for passing touchdowns, yards, attempts and completions and was named the winner of the Jerry Rice Award. Atkinson entered the transfer portal after the season.

=== Oregon State ===
On January 11, 2026, Atkinson transferred to Oregon State. After a competitive training camp, Atkinson won the starting spot, beating out returning starter Maalik Murphy and Western Michigan transfer Brady Jones.

Atkinson went on to lead the FBS in passing yards and TD throws through seven games with 2,604 yards and 24 TDs compared to only two interceptions. A frequent target, wide receiver Jesse Legree, also led the country with 1,040 yards receiving and 14 TDs through the same period. The pair led the Beavers to a 5-2 record before their bye week, an improvement on the previous season’s 2-10 overall record.

On November 2, 2026, Oregon State announced that Atkinson and Legree signed with Nike’s Blue Ribbon Elite NIL program.

=== Statistics ===
Season	Team	Games			Passing								Rushing			
Season	Team	GP	GS	Record	Cmp	Att	Pct	Yds	Y/A	TD	Int	Rtg	Att	Yds	Avg	TD
2025	Mercer	11	11	9–2	268	407	65.8	3,611	8.9	34	11	162.5	14	9	0.6	1
2026	Oregon State	9	9	5-4	242	368	65.8	3,169	8.6	25	3	158.9	35	-7	-0.2	2
Career		20	20	14-6	510	775	65.8	6,780	8.7	59	14	160.8	49	2	0.0	3
