= Darrius Clemons =

American football player (born 2003)

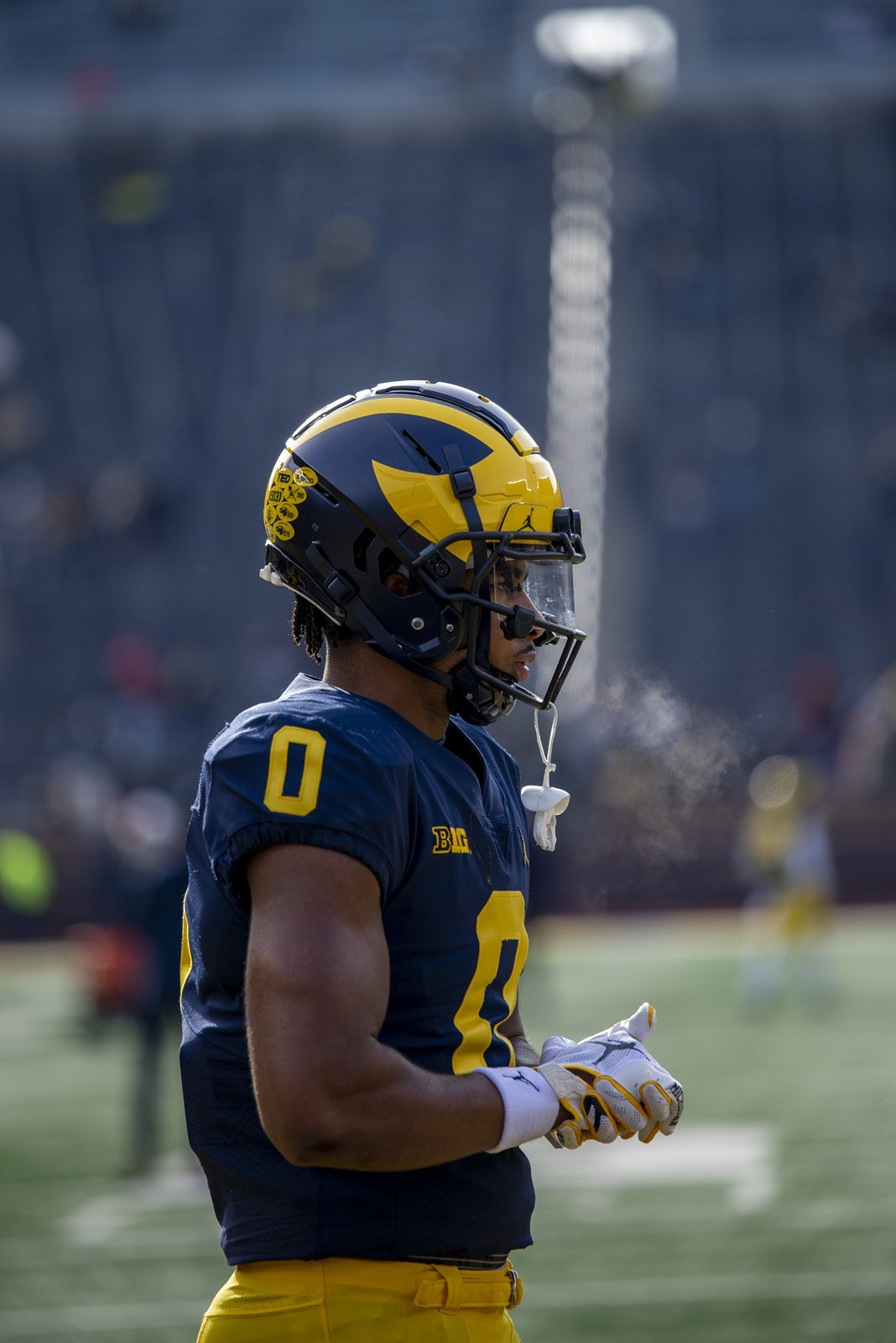

No. 1 – Oregon State Beavers
- Position: Wide receiver
- Class: Junior

Personal information
- Born: April 9, 2003 (age 23)
- Listed height: 6 ft 3 in (1.91 m)
- Listed weight: 212 lb (96 kg)

Career information
- High school: Westview (Portland, Oregon)
- College: Michigan (2022–2023); Oregon State (2024–2025); Washington State (2026-present)

Awards and highlights
- CFP national champion (2023)
- Stats at ESPN

Darrius Clemons (born April 9, 2003) is an American college football wide receiver for the Washington State Cougars. He previously played for the Michigan Wolverines, where he won a national championship in 2023.

== Early life ==
Clemons was born on April 9, 2003, to Christa Gordon and Larry Clemons. His father Larry played college football as a wide receiver for the Florida Gators. Darrius began playing high school football at Westview High School in Oregon from 2018 to 2020. As a junior in 2020, he transferred to Pleasant Grove High School in Utah and he caught 38 passes for 817 yards and 10 touchdowns. As a senior in 2021, he transferred back to Westview High School in his hometown Portland, Oregon, playing both wide receiver and defensive back and tallying over 800 receiving yards and 17 touchdowns. He ran a 4.37 laser-timed 40-yard dash in 2020.

=== Recruiting ===
Clemons was rated by 247Sports as the No. 1 player from Oregon in the class of 2022. After narrowing his finalists to Auburn, Oregon, Miami, Michigan, and Penn State, Clemons committed to Michigan in December 2021. He said he chose the University of Michigan based on academics.

== College career ==
=== Michigan ===
Clemons enrolled in 2022 and appeared in eleven games as a freshman, including nine as a backup at wide receiver. He tallied one reception for seven yards on the season.

As a sophomore in 2023, Clemons appeared in 11 games and played as a wide receiver in nine, including the 2024 CFP National Championship Game. He finished the season with three catches for 33 yards. On January 10, 2024, Clemons announced that he would enter the NCAA transfer portal.

=== Oregon State ===
On January 15, 2024, Clemons announced that he would transfer to Oregon State.
