= AJ Newberry =

American football player (born 2005)

No. 23 – Oregon State Beavers
- Position: Running back
- Class: Redshirt Junior

Personal information
- Born: January 28, 2005 (age 21)
- Listed height: 6 ft 1 in (1.85 m)
- Listed weight: 200 lb (91 kg)

Career information
- High school: South Grand Prairie (Grand Prairie, Texas)
- College: Vanderbilt (2023–2025); Oregon State (2026–present)
- Stats at ESPN

AJ Newberry (born January 28, 2005) is an American football running back for the Oregon State Beavers. He previously played for the Vanderbilt Commodores.

== Early life ==
Newberry attended South Grand Prairie High School in Grand Prairie, Texas. He was rated as a three-star recruit by Rivals.com and committed to play college football for the Colorado Buffaloes over offers from Georgia Tech, Rice, and SMU. However, Newberry flipped his commitment to play for the Vanderbilt Commodores.

== College career ==
=== Vanderbilt ===
As a freshman in 2023, Newberry rushed 20 times for 96 yards. In 2024, he posted 185 yards and three touchdowns on 11 carries and seven receptions for 134 yards and two touchdowns in 11 games. In 2025, Newberry rushed for 57 yards and three touchdowns on 18 carries and added two receptions for 18 yards. After the season, he entered the NCAA transfer portal.

=== Oregon State ===
Newberry transferred to play for the Oregon State Beavers. In week 4 of the 2026 season, he rushed for 111 yards and a touchdown on 11 carries in a win over UTEP.
