= 2024 San Jose State Spartans football team =

American college football season

2024 San Jose State Spartans football

Hawaii Bowl, L 39–41 ^{5OT} vs. South Florida
- Conference: Mountain West Conference
- Record: 7–6 (3–4 MW)
- Head coach: Ken Niumatalolo (1st season)
- Offensive coordinator: Craig Stutzmann (1st season)
- Offensive scheme: Spread-N-Shred
- Defensive coordinator: Derrick Odum (8th season)
- Base defense: 3–4
- Home stadium: CEFCU Stadium

Uniform
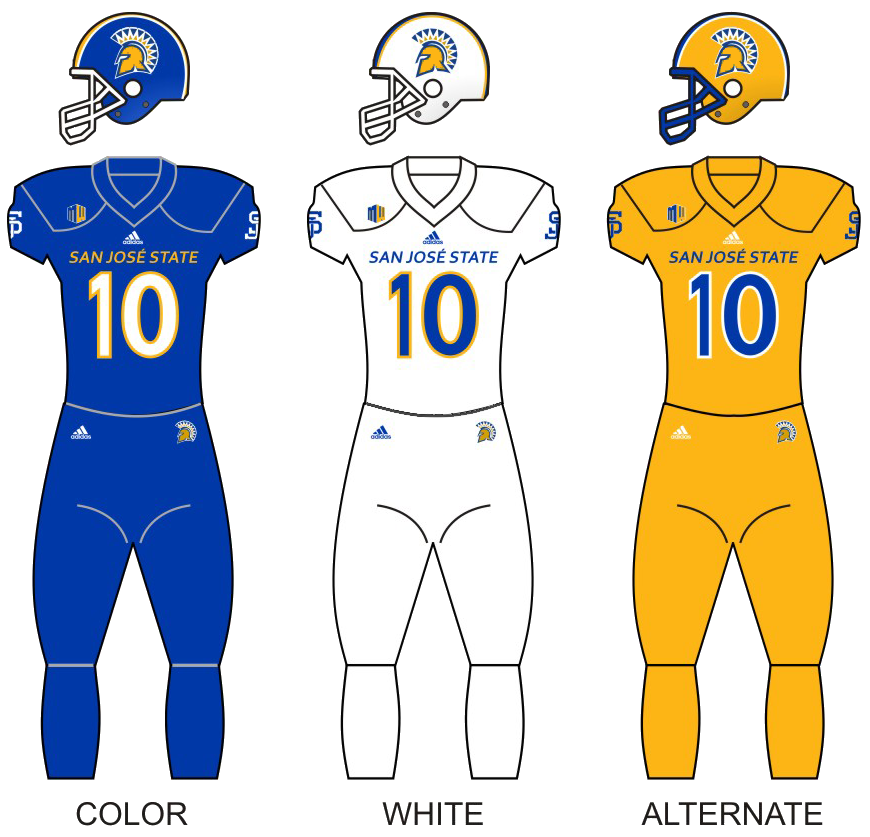

2024 Mountain West Conference football standings
	Conf.			Overall
Team	W		L	W		L
No. 8 Boise State y$^	7	–	0	12	–	2
No. 23 UNLV y	6	–	1	11	–	3
Colorado State	6	–	1	8	–	5
Fresno State	4	–	3	6	–	7
San Jose State	3	–	4	7	–	6
Air Force	3	–	4	5	–	7
Hawaii	3	–	4	5	–	7
New Mexico	3	–	4	5	–	7
Utah State	3	–	4	4	–	8
San Diego State	2	–	5	3	–	9
Wyoming	2	–	5	3	–	9
Nevada	0	–	7	3	–	10
Championship: Boise State 21, UNLV 7
^ – College Football Playoff participant; $ – Conference champion; y – Championship game participant; Rankings from AP Poll

The 2024 San Jose State Spartans football team represented San Jose State University during the 2024 NCAA Division I FBS football season. The Spartans were led by first-year head coach Ken Niumatalolo. The Spartans played their home games at CEFCU Stadium in San Jose, California.

== Offseason ==
=== Coaching staff changes ===
Name	Position	Reason	Replacement
Brent Brennan	Head coach	Accepted job at Arizona	Ken Niumatalolo
Alonzo Carter	Running backs coach	Accepted job at Arizona	Marcus Thomas
Josh Oglesby	Offensive line coach	Accepted job at Arizona	John Estes
Matt Adkins	Tight ends coach	Accepted job at Arizona	Mike Judge
Joe Seumalo	Defensive line coach	Accepted job at Arizona	Al Lupuaho
Chip Viney	Cornerbacks coach	Accepted job at Arizona	Greg Burns
Lyle Moevao	Football analyst	Accepted job at Arizona	Billy Ray Stutzmann
Cullen Carroll	Strength & conditioning coach	Accepted job at Arizona	Nuʻu Tafisi
James Perez	Strength & conditioning assistant coach	Accepted job at Arizona	Antonio Leonard
Kevin McGiven	Offensive coordinator	Reassigned to Wide receivers coach / Passing game coordinator	Craig Stutzmann
Scott White	Inside linebackers coach	Accepted Job at UCLA	Bojay Filimoeatu
Rob Christoff	Outside linebackers coach	TBD	Josh Irvin

=== Transfers ===
==== Incoming transfers ====
Player	Num	Position	Height	Weight	Year	Hometown	Former Team
Larry Turner-Gooden	13	S	6'0"	204	(redshirt) Freshman	South Central Los Angeles, CA	Texas
Floyd Chalk IV	3	RB	5'9"	185	Sophomore	Mission Hills, CA	Grambling
Robert Rahimi	6	RB	6'1"	190	Junior	Santa Ana, CA	Liberty
Treyshun Hurry	18	WR	6'2"	185	(redshirt) Freshman	Lancaster, CA	Weber State
Emmett Brown	18	QB	5'10"	187	(redshirt) Freshman	San Marcos, CA	Washington State

==== Outgoing transfers ====
Player	Num	Position	Height	Weight	Year	Hometown	Destination
Sam Olson	88	TE	6'3	242	(redshirt) Junior	Visalia, CA	Arizona
Taren Schive	49	K/P	5'11"	181	Junior	Riverside, CA	Boise State
Ryan Stewart	68	OT	6'4"	295	(redshirt) Sophomore	Mokena, IL	Arizona
Tre Smith	3	EDGE	6'5"	255	(redshirt) Sophomore	Mesa, AZ	Arizona
Bryun Parham	6	LB	5'11"	212	Junior	Long Beach, CA	Washington
Quali Conley	7	RB	5'10"	207	Junior	Fresno, CA	Arizona
Justin Eklund	40	LB	6'2"	220	Freshman	Rocklin, CA	Bowling Green
Jairus Satele	56	DL	6'1"	285	Freshman	Carson, CA	Fresno State
Charles Ross	4	WR	6'1"	171	(redshirt) Junior	Culver City, CA	USC
Fernando Carmona, Jr.	79	OT	6'5"	265	(redshirt) Freshman	Las Vegas, NV	Arkansas
Branden Alvarez	83	WR	5'11"	180	(redshirt) Freshman	Corona, CA	Portland State
Elijah Wood	14	LB	6'3"	205	(redshirt) Freshman	Elk Grove, CA	Utah Tech
Anthony Madrigal	55	LB	5'11"	220	Sophomore	San Jose, CA	Unknown
Dominick Mazotti	81	TE	6'4"	205	Junior	Pleasanton, CA	UMass
Charlie Leota	93	DL	6'1"	375	Junior	Auckland, NZ	Unknown

==== Withdrawn transfers ====
Player	Num	Position	Height	Weight	Year	Hometown
Nick Nash	3	WR	6'3"	198	(redshirt) Junior	Irvine, CA
Soane Toia	42	DL	6'0"	280	Junior	Nukuʻalofa, TONG

=== Recruiting class ===
College recruiting
Name	Hometown	School	Height	Weight	Commit date
Lamar Radcliffe; Running back	Sacramento, CA	Sacramento High School	6 ft 2 in (1.88 m)	220 lb (100 kg)	Feb 3, 2024
Lamar Radcliffe; Running back	Recruit ratings: Rivals: 247Sports: ESPN: (77)				
Joseph Bey; Safety	San Mateo, CA	Junípero Serra High School (San Mateo, California)	6 ft 1 in (1.85 m)	195 lb (88 kg)	Jul 13, 2023
Joseph Bey; Safety	Recruit ratings: Rivals: 247Sports: ESPN: (75)				
Jacob Stewart; Tight end	Brentwood, TN	Sacramento City College (JC)	6 ft 6 in (1.98 m)	230 lb (100 kg)	Dec 11, 2023
Jacob Stewart; Tight end	Recruit ratings: Rivals: 247Sports: ESPN: (74)				
Gregory McClendon; Defensive end	Long Beach, CA	Millikan High School	6 ft 4 in (1.93 m)	215 lb (98 kg)	Oct 18, 2023
Gregory McClendon; Defensive end	Recruit ratings: Rivals: 247Sports: ESPN: (74)				
Jabari Mann; Linebacker	San Mateo, CA	Junípero Serra High School (San Mateo, California)	6 ft 0 in (1.83 m)	210 lb (95 kg)	Feb 19, 2023
Jabari Mann; Linebacker	Recruit ratings: Rivals: 247Sports: ESPN: (74)				
David Tuihalangingie; Linebacker	Humble, TX	Trinity Valley Community College (JC)	5 ft 11 in (1.80 m)	190 lb (86 kg)	Nov 9, 2023
David Tuihalangingie; Linebacker	Recruit ratings: Rivals: 247Sports: ESPN: (72)				
Manuel Serna; Offensive tackle	Concord, CA	Clayton Valley Charter High School	6 ft 5 in (1.96 m)	300 lb (140 kg)	Aug 8, 2023
Manuel Serna; Offensive tackle	Recruit ratings: Rivals: 247Sports: (NR)				
Alonzo Contreras; Quarterback	Calabasas, CA	Viewpoint School	5 ft 11 in (1.80 m)	180 lb (82 kg)	May 1, 2023
Alonzo Contreras; Quarterback	Recruit ratings: Rivals: 247Sports: (NR)				
John Stowers; Linebacker	San Jose, CA	William C. Overfelt High School	6 ft 2 in (1.88 m)	240 lb (110 kg)	Jun 27, 2023
John Stowers; Linebacker	Recruit ratings: Rivals: 247Sports: (NR)				
Noa Siaosi; Defensive end	Vacaville, CA	Vacaville High School	6 ft 3 in (1.91 m)	230 lb (100 kg)	Jul 29, 2023
Noa Siaosi; Defensive end	Recruit ratings: Rivals: 247Sports: (NR)				
Mohammad Othman; Offensive tackle	Elk Grove, CA	Pleasant Grove High School (California)	6 ft 6 in (1.98 m)	270 lb (120 kg)	Aug 1, 2023
Mohammad Othman; Offensive tackle	Recruit ratings: Rivals: 247Sports: (NR)				
Tevita Manukainiu; Offensive tackle	San Mateo, CA	Aragon High School	6 ft 8 in (2.03 m)	280 lb (130 kg)	Aug 13, 2023
Tevita Manukainiu; Offensive tackle	Recruit ratings: Rivals: 247Sports: (NR)				
Marcellus Chandler; Wide receiver	Fairfield, CA	Vanden High School	5 ft 9 in (1.75 m)	170 lb (77 kg)	Nov 15, 2023
Marcellus Chandler; Wide receiver	Recruit ratings: Rivals: 247Sports: (NR)				
Pau Reed; Defensive line	San Jose, CA	College of San Mateo (JC)	6 ft 4 in (1.93 m)	255 lb (116 kg)	Dec 20, 2023
Pau Reed; Defensive line	Recruit ratings: Rivals: (NR)				
Malakai Hoeft; Safety	San Mateo, CA	College of San Mateo (JC)	6 ft 3 in (1.91 m)	210 lb (95 kg)	Dec 21, 2023
Malakai Hoeft; Safety	Recruit ratings: Rivals: 247Sports: (NR)				
Soane Kolokihakaufisi; Defensive line	San Mateo, CA	College of San Mateo (JC)	6 ft 3 in (1.91 m)	285 lb (129 kg)	Dec 20, 2023
Soane Kolokihakaufisi; Defensive line	Recruit ratings: Rivals: (NR)				
Jaylen Thomas; Safety	Los Gatos, CA	Los Gatos High School	6 ft 0 in (1.83 m)	175 lb (79 kg)	Dec 20, 2023
Jaylen Thomas; Safety	Recruit ratings: Rivals: 247Sports: (NR)				
Dorian Hale; Quarterback	Brentwood, CA	City College of San Francisco (JC)	6 ft 0 in (1.83 m)	175 lb (79 kg)	Jan 27, 2024
Dorian Hale; Quarterback	Recruit ratings: Rivals: (NR)				
Overall recruit ranking:
‡ Refers to 40-yard dash; Note: In many cases, Scout, Rivals, 247Sports, On3, and ESPN may conflict in their listings of height, weight and 40 time.; In these cases, the average was taken. ESPN grades are on a 100-point scale.; Sources: "2024 Player Commitments – San Jose State". ESPN.; "2024 Team Ranking". Rivals.com.; "2024 San Jose State Spartans football team". 247Sports.

Walks-ons

Player	Position	Height	Weight	Year	Hometown	Former Team
Matt Fadelli	LS	5'11"	200	Junior	San Mateo, CA	College of San Mateo (JC)

== Preseason ==
=== Mountain West media poll ===
The Mountain West's preseason prediction poll was released on July 10, 2024.

Mountain West media poll
Predicted finish	Team	Votes (1st place)
1	Boise State	543 (38)
2	UNLV	471 (4)
3	Fresno State	460 (4)
4	Air Force	384
5	Colorado State	337
6	Wyoming	296
7	Utah State	285
8	San Diego State	251
9	Hawaii	214
10	San Jose State	185
11	New Mexico	85
12	Nevada	77

== Personnel ==
=== Coaching staff ===
Name	Position	Seasons at San Jose State^{†}	Alma mater
Ken Niumatalolo	Head coach	1st	Hawaii (1989)
Derrick Odum	Associate head coach / Defensive coordinator	8th	Utah (1993)
Bojay Filimoeatu	Inside linebackers coach / Run game coordinator	1st	Utah State (2012)
Josh Irvin	Outside linebackers coach	1st	Chapman (2013)
Al Lapuaho	Defensive line coach	1st	Utah State (2012)
Greg Burns	Cornerbacks coach	1st	Washington State (1995)
Craig Stutzmann	Offensive coordinator / Quarterbacks	1st	Hawaii (2002)
Kevin McGiven	Wide receivers coach / Passing game coordinator	7th	Utah Valley (2001)
Mike Judge	Tight ends coach / Run game coordinator	1st	Springfield (2004)
Marcus Thomas	Running backs coach	1st	Navy (2014)
John Estes	Offensive line coach	1st	Hawaii (2009)
Joe Palcic	Special teams / Senior football analyst	2nd	Miami (Ohio) (1998)
Billy Ray Stutzmann	Senior offensive analyst	1st	Hawaii (2013)
Nuʻu Tafisi	Head coach of athletic performance	1st	California (2006)
Antonio Leonard	Assistant strength and conditioning coach	1st	Grambling State (2011)
† – Number of consistent years at SJSU and position

== Schedule ==
Date	Time	Opponent	Site	TV	Result	Attendance
August 29	7:00 p.m.	No. 8 (FCS) Sacramento State*	CEFCU Stadium; San Jose, CA	TruTV	W 42–24	13,811
September 7	4:00 p.m.	at Air Force	Falcon Stadium; Colorado Springs, CO	CBSSN	W 17–7	22,478
September 14	4:00 p.m.	Kennesaw State*	CEFCU Stadium; San Jose, CA	TruTV	W 31–10	11,090
September 20	7:00 p.m.	at Washington State*	Martin Stadium; Pullman, WA	The CW	L 52–54 ^{2OT}	24,808
October 5	4:30 p.m.	Nevada	CEFCU Stadium; San Jose, CA	TruTV	W 35–31	17,099
October 12	12:30 p.m.	at Colorado State	Canvas Stadium; Fort Collins, CO	TruTV	L 24–31	27,280
October 19	1:00 p.m.	Wyoming	CEFCU Stadium; San Jose, CA	NBCSBA	W 24–14	17,101
October 26	5:00 p.m.	at Fresno State	Valley Children's Stadium; Fresno, CA (Battle for the Valley)	TruTV	L 10–33	41,343
November 9	12:30 p.m.	at Oregon State*	Reser Stadium; Corvallis, OR	The CW	W 24–13	37,187
November 16	4:00 p.m.	No. 13 Boise State	CEFCU Stadium; San Jose, CA	CBSSN	L 21–42	20,517
November 22	7:00 p.m.	No. 24 UNLV	CEFCU Stadium; San Jose, CA	FS1	L 16–27	13,671
November 29	1:00 p.m.	Stanford*	CEFCU Stadium; San Jose, CA (Bill Walsh Legacy Game)	CBS	W 34–31	19,117
December 24	5:00 p.m.	vs. South Florida*	Clarence T. C. Ching Athletics Complex; Honolulu, HI (Hawaii Bowl)	ESPN	L 39–41 ^{5OT}	6,720
*Non-conference game; Rankings from Coaches' Poll released prior to the game

== Game summaries ==
=== vs. No. 8 (FCS) Sacramento State ===
Game One – No. 8 (FCS) Sacramento State Hornets (0–0) vs San Jose State Spartans (0–0) – Game summary

Quarter	1	2	3	4	Total
No. 8 (FCS) Hornets	14	3	7	0	24
Spartans	7	7	7	21	42

at CEFCU Stadium • San Jose, CA

- Date: Thursday August 29, 2024
- Game time: 7:00 PM PST
- Game attendance: 13,811
- Referee: Christian Watson
- TV announcers (TruTV): Ari Wolfe (play-by-play) and Darius Walker (analyst)

Game information

First quarter

- (7:18) SAC – Elijah Tau-Tolliver 3-yard run (Zach Schreiner kick) (Drive: 12 plays, 72 yards, 4:50; Sacramento State 7-0)
- (5:30) SAC – Elijah Tau-Tolliver 2-yard run (Zach Schreiner kick) (Drive: 4 plays, 15 yards, 1:31; Sacramento State 14-0)
- (3:09) SJSU – Nick Nash 24-yard pass from Emmett Brown (Kyler Halvorsen kick) (Drive: 6 plays, 68 yards, 2:16; Sacramento State 14-7)

Second quarter

- (9:28) SAC – Zach Schreiner 28-yard field goal (Drive: 9 plays, 35 yards, 3:25; Sacramento State 17-7)
- (1:49) SJSU – Jacob Stewart 26-yard pass from Nick Nash (Kyler Halvorsen kick) (Drive: 6 plays, 68 yards, 1:53; Sacramento State 17-14)

Third quarter

- (12:29) SJSU – Nick Nash 11-yard pass from Emmett Brown (Kyler Halvorsen kick) (Drive: 7 plays, 75 yards, 2:31; San Jose State 21-17)
- (2:24) SAC – Danny Scudero 20-yard pass from Carson Conklin (Zach Schreiner kick) (Drive: 11 plays, 80 yards, 4:43; Sacramento State 24-21)

Fourth quarter

- (12:13) SJSU – Floyd Chalk IV 4-yard run (Kyler Halvorsen kick) (Drive: 12 plays, 90 yards, 5:06; San Jose State 28-24)
- (10:09) SJSU – Justin Lockhart 8-yard pass from Emmett Brown (Kyler Halvorsen kick) (Drive: 4 plays, 18 yards, 1:57; San Jose State 35-24)
- (2:07) SJSU – Floyd Chalk IV 27-yard run (Kyler Halvorsen kick) (Drive: 1 play, 22 yards, 0:06; San Jose State 42-24)

Statistics	SAC	SJSU
First downs	23	25
Total yards	62–356	66–387
Rushing yards	41–177	31–63
Passing yards	179	324
Passing: Comp–Att–Int	21–41–2	21–35–1
Time of possession	33:41	26:35

Team	Category	Player	Statistics
Sacramento State	Passing	Kaiden Bennett	17/32, 134 yards, 2 INT
Sacramento State	Rushing	Elijah Tau-Tolliver	22 carries, 110 yards, 2 TD
Sacramento State	Receiving	Anderson Grover	5 receptions, 64 yards
San Jose State	Passing	Emmett Brown	20/34, 298 yards, 3 TD, INT
San Jose State	Rushing	Floyd Chalk IV	18 carries, 87 yards, 2 TD
San Jose State	Receiving	Nick Nash	10 receptions, 170 yards, 2 TD

=== at Air Force ===
San Jose State Spartans (1–0) at Air Force Falcons (1–0) – Game summary

Quarter	1	2	3	4	Total
Spartans	14	0	0	3	17
Falcons	7	0	0	0	7

at Falcon Stadium • Colorado Springs, CO

- Date: September 7, 2024
- Game time: 4:00 p.m.
- Game weather: Sunny, 81 °F (27 °C)
- Game attendance: 22,478
- Referee: Patrick Foy
- TV announcers (CBSSN): Chris Lewis (play-by-play) and Taylor McHargue (analyst)

Game information

First quarter

- (11:23) SJSU – Nick Nash 18 yard pass from Emmett Brown, Kyler Halvorsen kick (Drive: 8 plays, 75 yards, 3:37; San Jose State 7–0)
- (5:29) AF – Cade Harris 6 yard run, Matthew Dapore kick (Drive: 4 plays, 14 yards, 2:21; Tied 7–7)
- (4:06) SJSU – Jackson Canaan 58 yard pass from Emmett Brown, Kyler Halvorsen kick (Drive: 4 plays, 75 yards, 1:23; San Jose State 14–7)

Second quarter

No scoring

Third quarter

No scoring

Fourth quarter

- (8:25) SJSU – Kyler Halvorsen 34 yard field goal (Drive: 12 plays, 63 yards, 7:07; San Jose State 17–7)

Statistics	SJSU	AFA
First downs	15	10
Total yards	312	197
Rushing yards	50	143
Passing yards	262	54
Passing: Comp–Att–Int	17-33-1	7-20-2
Time of possession	30:37	29:23

Team	Category	Player	Statistics
San Jose State	Passing	Emmett Brown	17/32, 262 yards, 2 TD, 1 INT
San Jose State	Rushing	Floyd Chalk IV	15 carries, 43 yards
San Jose State	Receiving	Nick Nash	7 receptions, 90 yards, 1 TD
Air Force	Passing	John Busha	7/20, 54 yards, 2 INT
Air Force	Rushing	Cade Harris	8 carries, 50 yards, 1 TD
Air Force	Receiving	Quin Smith	3 receptions, 36 yards

=== vs Kennesaw State ===
Kennesaw State Owls (0–2) vs San Jose State Spartans (2–0) – Game summary

Quarter	1	2	3	4	Total
Owls	3	0	7	0	10
Spartans	0	17	7	7	31

at CEFCU Stadium • San Jose, CA

- Date: September 14, 2024
- Game time: 4:00 p.m. PST
- Game weather: 71 °F (22 °C)
- Game attendance: 11,090
- TV announcers (TruTV): Ari Wolfe (play-by-play) and Darius Walker (analyst)

Game information

First quarter

- (8:38) KENN – Austin Welch 32 yard field goal (Drive: 11 plays, 27 yards, 6:08; KENN 3–0)

Second quarter

- (14:30) SJSU – Nick Nash 24 yard pass from Emmett Brown, Kyler Halvorsen kick (Drive: 8 plays, 77 yards, 2:59; SJSU 7–3)
- (10:38) SJSU – Kyler Halvorsen 28 yard field goal (Drive: 5 plays, 50 yards, 1:41; SJSU 10–3)
- (0:15) SJSU – Nick Nash 3 yard pass from Emmett Brown, Kyler Halvorsen kick (Drive: 11 plays, 82 yards, 4:20; SJSU 17–3)

Third quarter

- (5:14) KENN – Preston Daniels 1 yard run, Austin Welch kick (Drive: 18 plays, 75 yards, 9:46; SJSU 17–10)
- (4:31) SJSU – Justin Lockhart 35 yard pass from Emmett Brown, Kyler Halvorsen kick (Drive: 2 plays, 55 yards, 0:35; SJSU 24–10)

Fourth quarter

- (3:07) SJSU – Nick Nash 9 yard pass from Emmett Brown, Kyler Halvorsen kick (Drive: 4 plays, 22 yards, 1:13; SJSU 31–10)

Statistics	KENN	SJSU
First downs	10	18
Total yards	192	417
Rushing yards	64	62
Passing yards	128	355
Passing: Comp–Att–Int	14-25-2	26-39-0
Time of possession	33:50	26:10

Team	Category	Player	Statistics
Kennesaw State	Passing	Davis Bryson	14/22, 128 yards, 1 INT
Kennesaw State	Rushing	Michael Benefield	12 carries, 33 yards
Kennesaw State	Receiving	Qua Ashley	4 receptions, 51 yards
San Jose State	Passing	Emmett Brown	26/38, 355 yards, 4 TD
San Jose State	Rushing	Jabari Bates	11 carries, 61 yards
San Jose State	Receiving	Nick Nash	17 receptions, 225 yards, 3 TD

=== at Washington State ===
San Jose State Spartans (3–0) at Washington State Cougars (3–0) – Game summary

Quarter	1	2	3	4	OT	2OT	Total
Spartans	10	7	21	8	0	6	52
Cougars	7	17	0	22	0	8	54

at Martin Stadium • Pullman, WA

- Date: September 20, 2024
- Game time: 7:00 p.m.
- Game weather: Sunny
- Game attendance: 24,808
- Referee: John Love
- TV announcers (The CW): J. B. Long (play-by-play) and Michael Bumpus (analyst)

Game information

First quarter

- (9:00) WSU – John Mateer 1-yard run, Dean Janikowski kick (Drive: 13 plays, 76 yards, 5:56; Washington State 7–0)
- (8:19) SJSU – Floyd Chalk IV 66-yard run, Kyler Halvorsen kick (Drive: 2 plays, 75 yards, 0:41; Tied 7–7)
- (2:57) SJSU – Kyler Halvorsen 19-yard field goal (Drive: 11 plays, 48 yards, 5:22; San Jose State 10–7)

Second quarter

- (11:31) WSU – Cooper Mathers 4-yard pass from John Mateer, Dean Janikowski kick (Drive: 14 plays, 64 yards, 6:18; Washington State 14–10)
- (5:41) WSU – Cooper Mathers 8-yard pass from John Mateer, Dean Janikowski kick (Drive: 9 plays, 85 yards, 3:57; Washington State 21–10)
- (1:40) SJSU – Jacob Stewart 4-yard pass from Emmett Brown, Kyler Halvorsen kick (Drive: 9 plays, 76 yards, 2:54; Washington State 21–17)
- (0:02) WSU – Dean Janikowski 36-yard field goal (Drive: 12 plays, 56 yards, 1:38; Washington State 24–17)

Third quarter

- (13:02) SJSU – Nick Nash 19-yard pass from Emmett Brown, Kyler Halvorsen kick (Drive: 5 plays, 75 yards, 1:58; Tied 24–24)
- (5:43) SJSU – Emmett Brown 1-yard run, Kyler Halvorsen kick (Drive: 7 plays, 20 yards, 2:54; San Jose State 31–24)
- (0:48) SJSU – Floyd Chalk IV 18-yard run, Kyler Halvorsen kick (Drive: 7 plays, 75 yards, 4:13; San Jose State 38–24)

Fourth quarter

- (13:41) WSU – Kyle Williams 13-yard pass from John Mateer, Dean Janikowski kick (Drive: 6 plays, 65 yards, 2:07; San Jose State 38–31)
- (6:11) WSU – Josh Meredith 36-yard pass from John Mateer, Dean Janikowski kick failed (Drive: 5 plays, 64 yards, 1:23; San Jose State 38–37)
- (4:56) WSU – Dylan Paine 1-yard run, John Mateer pass failed (Drive: 2 plays, 32 yards, 0:23; Washington State 43–38)
- (0:26) SJSU – TreyShun Hurry 20-yard pass from Emmett Brown, Nick Nash pass (Drive: 8 plays, 72 yards, 1:26; San Jose State 46–43)
- (0:00) WSU – Dean Janikowski 52-yard field goal (Drive: 4 plays, 40 yards, 0:26; Tied 46–46)

First overtime

No scoring

Second overtime

- (0:00) WSU – Dylan Paine 7-yard run, John Mateer pass (Drive: 5 plays, 25 yards, 15:00; Washington State 54–46)
- (0:00) SJSU – Nick Nash 4-yard pass from Emmett Brown, Emmett Brown pass failed (Drive: 5 plays, 25 yards, 15:00; Washington State 54–52)

Statistics	SJSU	WSU
First downs	23	31
Total yards	491	627
Rushing yards	116	237
Passing yards	375	390
Passing: Comp–Att–Int	35–54–2	26–46–2
Time of possession	28:07	31:53

Team	Category	Player	Statistics
San Jose State	Passing	Emmett Brown	35/54, 375 yards, 4 TD, 2 INT
San Jose State	Rushing	Floyd Chalk IV	11 carries, 94 yards, 2 TD
San Jose State	Receiving	Nick Nash	16 receptions, 152 yards, 2 TD
Washington State	Passing	John Mateer	26/46, 390 yards, 4 TD, 2 INT
Washington State	Rushing	John Mateer	18 carries, 111 yards, TD
Washington State	Receiving	Kyle Williams	8 receptions, 138 yards, TD

=== vs. Nevada ===
Game Five – Nevada Wolf Pack (2–3) at San Jose State Spartans (3–1) – Game summary

Quarter	1	2	3	4	Total
Wolf Pack	7	14	7	3	31
Spartans	7	14	7	7	35

at CEFCU Stadium • San Jose, CA

- Date: Saturday October 5, 2024
- Game time: 4:30 p.m.
- Game weather: Sunny, 99 °F (37 °C)
- TV announcers (TruTV): Ari Wolfe (play-by-play) and Darius Walker (analyst)

Game information

First quarter
Second quarter
Third quarter
Fourth quarter

Statistics	NEV	SJSU
First downs	23	26
Total yards	416	441
Rushing yards	190	144
Passing yards	226	327
Passing: Comp–Att–Int	23-31-1	23-42-0
Time of possession	35:03	24:57

Team	Category	Player	Statistics
Nevada	Passing	Brendon Lewis	22/30, 213 yards, 2 TD, INT
Nevada	Rushing	Brendon Lewis	13 carries, 90 yards, 2 TD
Nevada	Receiving	Jaden Smith	6 receptions, 89 yards, 2 TD
San Jose State	Passing	Emmett Brown	12/28, 170 yards, TD
San Jose State	Rushing	Floyd Chalk IV	14 carries, 57 yards, 2 TD
San Jose State	Receiving	Nick Nash	5 receptions, 75 yards, TD

=== at Colorado State ===
San Jose State Spartans (4–1) at Colorado State Rams (2–3) – Game summary

Quarter	1	2	3	4	Total
Spartans	7	7	0	10	24
Rams	7	7	7	10	31

at Canvas Stadium • Fort Collins, CO

- Date: October 12, 2024
- Game time: 12:30 p.m.
- Game weather: Sunny, 77 °F (25 °C)
- Game attendance: 27,280
- Referee: Nolan Dumas
- TV announcers (TruTV): Ari Wolfe (play-by-play) and Darius Walker (analyst)

Game information

First quarter

- CSU – Avery Morrow 2-yard run (Jordan Noyes kick), 9:56. Rams 7–0. Drive: 9 plays, 75 yards, 5:04.
- SJSU – Nick Nash 27-yard pass from Emmett Brown (Kyler Halvorsen kick), 5:28. Tied 7–7. Drive: 9 plays, 77 yards, 4:22.

Second quarter

- CSU – Brayden Fowler-Nicolosi 23-yard run (Jordan Noyes kick), 14:16. Rams 14–7. Drive: 3 plays, 44 yards, 0:39.
- SJSU – D. J. Harvey 85-yard fumble return (Kyler Halvorsen kick), 0:56. Tied 14–14.

Third quarter

- CSU – Avery Morrow 2-yard run (Jordan Noyes kick), 1:48. Rams 21–14. Drive: 9 plays, 91 yards, 4:54.

Fourth quarter

- CSU – Jordan Noyes 58-yard field goal, 8:35. Rams 24–14. Drive: 11 plays, 35 yards, 4:21.
- SJSU – Floyd Chalk IV 21-yard run (Kyler Halvorsen kick), 5:07. Rams 24–21. Drive: 10 plays, 75 yards, 3:28.
- CSU – Armani Winfield 62-yard pass from Brayden Fowler-Nicolosi (Jordan Noyes kick), 2:44. Rams 31–21. Drive: 4 plays, 75 yards, 2:23.
- SJSU – Kyler Halvorsen 31-yard field goal, 1:06. Rams 31–24. Drive: 6 plays, 54 yards, 0:55.

Statistics	SJSU	CSU
First downs	21	24
Total yards	448	455
Rushing yards	101	186
Passing yards	347	269
Passing: Comp–Att–Int	30–44–1	22–30–1
Time of possession	28:31	31:29

Team	Category	Player	Statistics
San Jose State	Passing	Walker Eget	22/30, 256 yards, INT
San Jose State	Rushing	Floyd Chalk IV	10 carries, 61 yards, TD
San Jose State	Receiving	Nick Nash	7 receptions, 94 yards, TD
Colorado State	Passing	Brayden Fowler-Nicolosi	22/30, 269 yards, TD, INT
Colorado State	Rushing	Avery Morrow	22 carries, 100 yards, 2 TD
Colorado State	Receiving	Armani Winfield	6 receptions, 108 yards, TD

=== vs Wyoming ===
Wyoming Cowboys (1–5) vs San Jose State Spartans (4–2) – Game summary

Quarter	1	2	3	4	Total
Cowboys	0	0	7	7	14
Spartans	7	7	3	7	24

at CEFCU Stadium • San Jose, CA

- Date: October 19, 2024
- Game time: 1:00 p.m.
- Game weather: Sunny, 77 °F (25 °C)
- Game attendance: 17,101
- Referee: Patrick Foy
- TV announcers (NBCSBA): Larry Beil (play-by-play), David Fales (analyst), and Lindsey Pallares (sideline)

Game information

First quarter

- SJSU (13:45) – Floyd Chalk 39 yard run (Kyler Halvorsen kick); 5 plays, 75 yards, 1:15 (SJSU 7–0)

Second quarter

- SJSU (0:21) – Nick Nash 17 yard pass from Walker Eget (Kyler Halvorsen kick); 11 plays, 97 yards, 1:52 (SJSU 14–0)

Third quarter

- WYO (8:33) – Justin Stevenson 18 yard pass from Evan Svoboda (John Hoyland kick); 5 plays, 55 yards, 1:45 (SJSU 14–7)
- SJSU (6:08) – Kyler Halvorsen 26 yard field goal; 6 plays, 66 yards, 2:25 (SJSU 17–7)

Fourth quarter

- SJSU (7:16) – Jabari Bates 19 yard run (Kyler Halvorsen kick); 8 plays, 86 yards, 4:11 (SJSU 24–7)
- WYO (0:43) – John Michael Gyllenborg 63 yard pass from Kaden Anderson (John Hoyland kick); 1 play, 63 yards, 0:11 (SJSU 24–14)

Statistics	WYO	SJSU
First downs	19	20
Total yards	366	498
Rushing yards	56	176
Passing yards	310	322
Passing: Comp–Att–Int	18–38–3	21–39–2
Time of possession	36:16	23:44

Team	Category	Player	Statistics
Wyoming	Passing	Evan Svoboda	14/27, 194 yards, TD, INT
Wyoming	Rushing	Sam Scott	14 carries, 35 yards
Wyoming	Receiving	John Michael Gyllenborg	5 receptions, 137 yards, TD
San Jose State	Passing	Walker Eget	20/38, 318 yards, TD, 2 INT
San Jose State	Rushing	Floyd Chalk	12 carries, 91 yards, TD
San Jose State	Receiving	Justin Lockhart	4 receptions, 129 yards

=== at Fresno State (Battle for the Valley) ===
San Jose State Spartans (5–2) at Fresno State Bulldogs (4–3) – Game summary

Quarter	1	2	3	4	Total
Spartans	7	0	0	3	10
Bulldogs	3	17	7	6	33

at Valley Children's Stadium • Fresno, CA

- Date: October 26, 2024
- Game time: 5:00 p.m.
- Game weather: Cloudy • Temperature: 81 °F (27 °C) • Wind: NW 4 miles per hour (6.4 km/h)
- Game attendance: 41,343
- Referee: Kenneth Ray
- TV announcers (TruTV): Ari Wolfe (play-by-play) and Darius Walker (analyst)

Game information

First quarter

- (14:04) SJSU – Nick Nash 35-yard pass from Walker Eget, Kyler Halvorsen kick (Drive: 4 plays, 75 yards, 0:56; San Jose State 7–0)
- (9:48) FRES – Dylan Lynch 33-yard field goal (Drive: 10 plays, 60 yards, 4:16; San Jose State 7–3)

Second quarter

- (14:17) FRES – Elijah Gilliam 1-yard run, Dylan Lynch kick (Drive: 13 plays, 88 yards, 5:59; Fresno State 10–7)
- (11:14) FRES – Jalen Moss 43-yard pass from Mikey Keene, Dylan Lynch kick (Drive: 3 plays, 47 yards, 1:25; Fresno State 17–7)
- (2:19) FRES – Dylan Lynch 48-yard field goal (Drive: 14 plays, 61 yards, 6:03; Fresno State 20–7)

Third quarter

- (11:03) FRES – Mac Dalena 35-yard pass from Mikey Keene, Dylan Lynch kick (Drive: 10 plays, 75 yards, 3:57; Fresno State 27–7)

Fourth quarter

- (14:35) FRES – Jalen Moss 6-yard pass from Mikey Keene, Two–point conversion failed (Drive: 4 plays, 20 yards, 1:14; Fresno State 33–7)
- (5:08) SJSU – Kyler Halvorsen 37-yard field goal (Drive: 16 plays, 80 yards, 4:48; Fresno State 33–10)

Statistics	SJSU	FRES
First downs	20	22
Total yards	385	401
Rushing yards	101	126
Passing yards	284	275
Passing: Comp–Att–Int	21–51–4	30–41–1
Time of possession	24:38	35:12

Team	Category	Player	Statistics
San Jose State	Passing	Walker Eget	14/31, 202 yards, TD, 2 INT
San Jose State	Rushing	Floyd Chalk IV	10 carries, 89 yards
San Jose State	Receiving	Justin Lockhart	4 receptions, 93 yards
Fresno State	Passing	Mikey Keene	30/41, 275 yards, 3 TD, INT
Fresno State	Rushing	Elijah Gilliam	15 carries, 56 yards, TD
Fresno State	Receiving	Jalen Moss	6 receptions, 85 yards, 2 TD

=== at Oregon State ===
San Jose State Spartans (5–3) at Oregon State Beavers (4–4) – Game summary

Quarter	1	2	3	4	Total
Spartans	0	10	0	14	24
Beavers	0	10	3	0	13

at Reser Stadium • Corvallis, OR

- Date: November 9, 2024
- Game time: 12:30 p.m.
- Game weather: 0 °F (−18 °C)
- Game attendance: 37,187
- TV announcers (The CW): J. B. Long (play-by-play) and Michael Bumpus (analyst)

Game information

First quarter
Second quarter
Third quarter
Fourth quarter

Statistics	SJSU	OSU
First downs	20	29
Total yards	463	474
Rushing yards	68	182
Passing yards	395	292
Passing: Comp–Att–Int	18-35-1	24-37-2
Time of possession	20:15	39:45

Team	Category	Player	Statistics
San Jose State	Passing	Walker Eget	18-35, 395 yards, TD, INT
San Jose State	Rushing	Floyd Chalk IV	11 carries, 45 yards, TD
San Jose State	Receiving	Nick Nash	6 receptions, 161 yards, TD
Oregon State	Passing	Ben Gulbranson	24-37, 292 yards, 2 INT
Oregon State	Rushing	Anthony Hankerson	30 carries, 121 yards, TD
Oregon State	Receiving	Trent Walker	11 receptions, 151 yards

=== vs No. 13 Boise State ===
No. 13 Boise State Broncos (8–1) vs San Jose State Spartans (6–3) – Game summary

Quarter	1	2	3	4	Total
No. 13 Broncos	0	14	14	14	42
Spartans	7	7	7	0	21

at CEFCU Stadium • San Jose, CA

- Date: November 16, 2024
- Game time: 5:00 p.m.
- Game weather: 0 °F (−18 °C)
- Game attendance: 20,517
- TV announcers (CBSSN): Rich Waltz (play-by-play), Robert Turbin (analyst), and Amanda Guerra (sideline)

Game information

First quarter

- (10:14) SJSU - Justin Lockhart 6-yard pass from Walker Eget, Kyler Halvorsen kick (Drive: 8 plays, 68 yards, 3:17; San Jose State 7-0)

Second quarter

- (14:23) SJSU - Jacob Stewart 7-yard pass from Walker Eget, Kyler Halvorsen kick (Drive: 11 plays, 77 yards, 4:16; San Jose State 14-0)
- (5:36) BSU - Maddux Madsen 4-yard run, Jonah Dalmas kick (Drive: 11 plays, 92 yards, 5:50; San Jose State 14-7)
- (0:36) BSU - Ashton Jeanty 2-yard run, Jonah Dalmas kick (Drive: 10 plays, 75 yards, 3:27; Tied 14-14)

Third quarter

- (11:03) SJSU - Nick Nash 6-yard pass from Walker Eget, Kyler Halvorsen kick (Drive: 9 plays, 98 yards, 3:57; San Jose State 21-14)
- (6:43) BSU - Matt Lauter 17-yard pass from Maddux Madsen, Jonah Dalmas kick (Drive: 8 plays, 63 yards, 4:12; Tied 21-21)
- (1:42) BSU - Ashton Jeanty 36-yard run, Jonah Dalmas kick (Drive: 7 plays, 66 yards, 2:38; Boise State 28-21)

Fourth quarter

- (2:23) BSU - Ashton Jeanty 5-yard run, Jonah Dalmas kick (Drive: 12 plays, 89 yards, 6:18; Boise State 35-21)
- (1:42) BSU - Davon Banks 70-yard interception return, Jonah Dalmas kick (Boise State 42-21)

Statistics	BSU	SJSU
First downs	27	25
Total yards	456	484
Rushing yards	170	38
Passing yards	286	446
Passing: Comp–Att–Int	22-30-0	34-50-2
Time of possession	33:11	26:49

Team	Category	Player	Statistics
Boise State	Passing	Maddux Madsen	22/30, 286 yards, TD
Boise State	Rushing	Ashton Jeanty	32 carries, 159 yards, 3 TD
Boise State	Receiving	Cam Camper	6 receptions, 92 yards
San Jose State	Passing	Walker Eget	34/50, 446 yards, 3 TD, 2 INT
San Jose State	Rushing	Floyd Chalk IV	13 carries, 37 yards
San Jose State	Receiving	Justin Lockhart	10 receptions, 172 yards, TD

=== vs No. 24 UNLV ===
No. 24 UNLV Rebels (8–2) vs San Jose State Spartans (6–4) – Game summary

Quarter	1	2	3	4	Total
No. 24 Rebels	3	7	10	7	27
Spartans	0	16	0	0	16

at CEFCU Stadium • San Jose, CA

- Date: November 22, 2024
- Game time: 7:00 p.m.
- Game weather: Rain • Temperature: 60 °F (16 °C) • Wind: S 10 miles per hour (16 km/h)
- Game attendance: 13,671
- Referee: Jonathan Noli
- TV announcers (FS1): Trent Rush (play-by-play) and Petros Papadakis (analyst)

Game information

First quarter

- (2:54) UNLV – Caden Chittenden 31-yard field goal (Drive: 4 plays, 4 yards, 1:16; UNLV 3–0)

Second quarter

- (13:26) SJSU – Isiah Revis 40-yard interception, Kyler Halvorsen kick (San Jose State 7–3)
- (7:36) UNLV – Kaleo Ballungay 5-yard pass from Hajj-Malik Williams, Caden Chittenden kick (Drive: 13 plays, 75 yards, 5:50; UNLV 10–7)
- (5:02) SJSU – Matthew Coleman 33-yard pass from Walker Eget, Kyler Halvorsen kick (Drive: 7 plays, 75 yards, 2:34; San Jose State 14–10)
- (1:04) SJSU – 0-yard safety (San Jose State 16–10)

Third quarter

- (11:11) UNLV – Caden Chittenden 52-yard field goal (Drive: 9 plays, 25 yards, 3:39; San Jose State 16–13)
- (1:44) UNLV – Jai'Den Thomas 25-yard run, Caden Chittenden kick (Drive: 5 plays, 74 yards, 1:30; UNLV 20–16)

Fourth quarter

- (8:29) UNLV – Kylin James 7-yard run, Caden Chittenden kick (Drive: 13 plays, 80 yards, 6:20; UNLV 27–16)

Statistics	UNLV	SJSU
First downs	24	9
Total yards	338	112
Rushing yards	207	31
Passing yards	131	81
Passing: Comp–Att–Int	11–20–1	4–22–0
Time of possession	40:42	19:18

Team	Category	Player	Statistics
UNLV	Passing	Hajj-Malik Williams	11/20, 131 yards, TD, INT
UNLV	Rushing	Jai'Den Thomas	26 carries, 135 yards, TD
UNLV	Receiving	Ricky White III	7 receptions, 98 yards
San Jose State	Passing	Walker Eget	4/22, 81 yards, TD
San Jose State	Rushing	Floyd Chalk IV	18 carries, 56 yards
San Jose State	Receiving	Matthew Coleman	1 reception, 33 yards, TD

=== vs Stanford (Bill Walsh Legacy Game) ===
Stanford Cardinal (3–8) vs San Jose State Spartans (6–5) – Game summary

Quarter	1	2	3	4	Total
Cardinal	3	7	7	14	31
Spartans	0	17	10	7	34

at CEFCU Stadium • San Jose, CA

- Date: November 29, 2024
- Game time: 1:00 p.m.
- Game weather: Sunny, 60 °F (16 °C)
- Game attendance: 19,117
- Referee: Justin Elliott
- TV announcers (CBS): Rich Waltz (play-by-play), Ross Tucker (analyst), and Amanda Guerra (sideline)

Game information

First quarter

- (5:49) STAN – Emmet Kenney 24-yard field goal (Drive: 12 plays, 65 yards, 7:01; Stanford 3–0)

Second quarter

- (9:03) SJSU – Nick Nash 20-yard pass from Walker Eget, Kyler Halvorsen kick (Drive: 7 plays, 96 yards, 3:02; San Jose State 7–3)
- (5:19) SJSU – Nick Nash 2-yard pass from Walker Eget, Kyler Halvorsen kick (Drive: 6 plays, 24 yards, 3:32; San Jose State 14–3)
- (0:42) STAN – Emmett Mosley V 12-yard pass from Ashton Daniels, Emmet Kenney kick (Drive: 14 plays, 75 yards, 4:37; San Jose State 14–10)
- (0:00) SJSU – Kyler Halvorsen 45-yard field goal (Drive: 7 plays, 47 yards, 0:42; San Jose State 17–10)

Third quarter

- (12:45) SJSU – Justin Lockhart 19-yard pass from Walker Eget, Kyler Halvorsen kick (Drive: 5 plays, 75 yards, 2:15; San Jose State 24–10)
- (9:13) STAN – Justin Lamson 1-yard rush, Emmet Kenney kick (Drive: 9 plays, 65 yards, 3:32; San Jose State 24–17)
- (4:57) SJSU – Kyler Halvorsen 24-yard field goal (Drive: 10 plays, 58 yards, 4:16; San Jose State 27–17)

Fourth quarter

- (14:46) STAN – Jahsiah Galvan 2-yard fumble return, Emmet Kenney kick (Drive: 5 plays, -5 yards, 2:00; San Jose State 27–24)
- (7:39) STAN – Ashton Daniels 1-yard run, Emmet Kenney kick (Drive: 5 plays, 53 yards, 2:35; Stanford 31–27)
- (1:55) SJSU – TreyShun Hurry 18-yard pass from Walker Eget, Kyler Halvorsen kick (Drive: 3 plays, 37 yards, 0:44; San Jose State 34–31)

Statistics	STAN	SJSU
First downs	21	30
Total yards	379	443
Rushing yards	127	58
Passing yards	252	385
Passing: Comp–Att–Int	26–40–3	33–50–1
Time of possession	31:18	28:37

Team	Category	Player	Statistics
Stanford	Passing	Ashton Daniels	26/40, 252 yards, TD, 3 INT
Stanford	Rushing	Ashton Daniels	17 carries, 91 yards, TD
Stanford	Receiving	Elic Ayomanor	10 receptions, 109 yards
San Jose State	Passing	Walker Eget	33/49, 385 yards, 4 TD, INT
San Jose State	Rushing	Lamar Radcliffe	7 carries, 43 yards
San Jose State	Receiving	Nick Nash	8 receptions, 91 yards, 2 TD

=== vs South Florida (Hawaii Bowl) ===
2024 Hawaii Bowl
South Florida Bulls (6–6) vs San Jose State Spartans (7–5) – Game summary

Quarter	1	2	3	4	OT	2OT	3OT	4OT	5OT	Total
Bulls	7	14	0	6	7	3	2	0	2	41
Spartans	0	10	10	7	7	3	2	0	0	39

at Clarence T. C. Ching Athletics Complex • Honolulu, HI

- Date: December 24, 2024
- Game time: 4:00 p.m. PST
- Game weather: Sunny • 77 °F (25 °C) • Wind: ENE at 17 miles per hour (27 km/h)
- Game attendance: 6,720
- Referee: Tim Barker
- TV announcers (ESPN): Tiffany Greene (play-by-play), Jay Walker (analyst), Marilyn Payne (sideline)
- Box score

Game information

First Quarter

- (0:45) USF – Kelley Joiner 4 yard run, John Cannon kick (Drive: 5 plays, 16 yards, 1:32; South Florida 7–0)

Second Quarter

- (6:53) USF – Nay'Quan Wright 3 yard run, John Cannon kick (Drive: 13 plays, 80 yards, 5:31; South Florida 14–0)
- (2:09) SJSU – Floyd Chalk IV 3 yard run, Kyler Halvorsen kick (Drive: 9 plays, 70 yards, 4:37; South Florida 14–7)
- (1:53) USF – Ta'Ron Keith 93 yard kickoff return, John Cannon kick (Drive: 9 plays, 70 yards, 4:37; South Florida 21–7)
- (0:00) SJSU – Kyler Halvorsen 42 yard field goal (Drive: 11 plays, 51 yards, 1:53; South Florida 21–10)

Third Quarter

- (9:05) SJSU – Kyler Halvorsen 22 yard field goal (Drive: 11 plays, 77 yards, 5:12; South Florida 21–13)
- (3:41) SJSU – Jackson Canaan 5 yard pass from Walker Eget, Kyler Halvorsen kick (Drive: 6 plays, 85 yards, 3:21; South Florida 21–20)

Fourth Quarter

- (13:00) USF – John Cannon 33 yard field goal (Drive: 15 plays, 60 yards, 5:41; South Florida 24–20)
- (11:14) SJSU – Lamar Radcliffe 2 yard run, Kyler Halvorsen kick (Drive: 1 plays, 2 yards, 0:04; San Jose State 27–24)
- (0:02) USF – John Cannon 41 yard field goal (Drive: 7 plays, 27 yards, 0:41; Tied 27–27)

Overtime

- USF – Ta'Ron Keith 2 yard run, John Cannon kick (Drive: 2 plays, 25 yards; South Florida 32–27)
- SJSU – Matthew Coleman 4 yard pass from Walker Eget, Kyler Halvorsen kick (Drive: 11 plays, 25 yards; Tied 34–34)

Second Overtime

- SJSU – Kyler Halvorsen 24 yard field goal (Drive: 5 plays, 18 yards; San Jose State 37–34)
- USF – John Cannon 36 yard field goal (Drive: 4 plays, 7 yards; Tied 37–37)

Third Overtime

- USF – Bryce Archie pass to Payten Singletary for 2-Point Conversion (Drive: 1 plays, 0 yards; South Florida 39–37)
- SJSU – Walker Eget Pass to Matthew Coleman for 2-Point Conversion (Drive: 1 plays, 0 yards; Tied 39–39)

Fourth Overtime

- No scoring

Fifth Overtime

- USF – Bryce Archie pass to Keshaun Singleton for 2-Point Conversion (Drive: 1 plays, 0 yards; South Florida 41–39)

Statistics	USF	SJSU
First downs	15	29
Total yards	291	441
Rushing yards	235	280
Passing yards	56	161
Passing: Comp–Att–Int	24–35–1	33–58–1
Time of possession	27:27	32:22

Team	Category	Player	Statistics
South Florida	Passing	Bryce Archie	24/35, 235 yards, INT
South Florida	Rushing	Kelley Joiner	11 carries, 33 yards, 1 TD
South Florida	Receiving	Sean Atkins	11 receptions, 13 targets, 104 yards
San Jose State	Passing	Walker Eget	33/58, 280 yds, 2 TDs, INT
San Jose State	Rushing	Lamar Radcliffe	15 carries, 65 yards, 1 TD
San Jose State	Receiving	Matthew Coleman	12 receptions, 15 targets, 109 yards, 1 TD
