= 2024 Nevada Wolf Pack football team =

American college football season

2024 Nevada Wolf Pack football
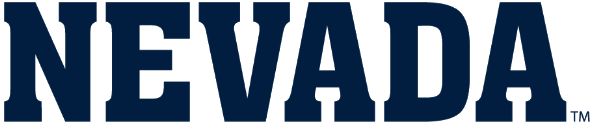
- Conference: Mountain West Conference
- Record: 3–10 (0–7 MW)
- Head coach: Jeff Choate (1st season)
- Offensive coordinator: Matt Lubick (1st season)
- Offensive scheme: Multiple
- Defensive coordinator: Kane Ioane (1st season)
- Base defense: 4–2–5
- Home stadium: Mackay Stadium

2024 Mountain West Conference football standings
	Conf.			Overall
Team	W		L	W		L
No. 8 Boise State y$^	7	–	0	12	–	2
No. 23 UNLV y	6	–	1	11	–	3
Colorado State	6	–	1	8	–	5
Fresno State	4	–	3	6	–	7
San Jose State	3	–	4	7	–	6
Air Force	3	–	4	5	–	7
Hawaii	3	–	4	5	–	7
New Mexico	3	–	4	5	–	7
Utah State	3	–	4	4	–	8
San Diego State	2	–	5	3	–	9
Wyoming	2	–	5	3	–	9
Nevada	0	–	7	3	–	10
Championship: Boise State 21, UNLV 7
^ – College Football Playoff participant; $ – Conference champion; y – Championship game participant; Rankings from AP Poll

The 2024 Nevada Wolf Pack football team represented the University of Nevada, Reno in the Mountain West Conference during the 2024 NCAA Division I FBS football season. The Wolf Pack were led by Jeff Choate in his first year as the head coach. The Wolf Pack played their home games at Mackay Stadium, located in Reno, Nevada.

== Preseason ==
=== Mountain West media poll ===
The Mountain West's preseason prediction poll was released on July 10, 2024. Nevada was predicted to finish in last place in the conference.

== Schedule ==
Date	Time	Opponent	Site	TV	Result	Attendance
August 24	5:00 p.m.	SMU*	Mackay Stadium; Reno, NV	CBSSN	L 24–29	20,263
August 31	4:00 p.m.	at Troy*	Veterans Memorial Stadium; Troy, AL	ESPN+	W 28–26	27,412
September 7	4:00 p.m.	Georgia Southern*	Mackay Stadium; Reno, NV	TruTV	L 17–20	16,245
September 14	12:30 p.m.	at Minnesota*	Huntington Bank Stadium; Minneapolis, MN	BTN	L 0–27	44,534
September 21	12:00 p.m.	Eastern Washington*	Mackay Stadium; Reno, NV	KNSN-TV	W 49–16	16,399
October 5	4:30 p.m.	at San Jose State	CEFCU Stadium; San Jose, CA	TruTV	L 31–35	17,099
October 12	4:30 p.m.	Oregon State*	Mackay Stadium; Reno, NV	CBSSN	W 42–37	21,541
October 18	7:30 p.m.	Fresno State	Mackay Stadium; Reno, NV	CBSSN	L 21–24	18,319
October 26	8:59 p.m.	at Hawaii	Clarence T. C. Ching Athletics Complex; Honolulu, HI	SPEC PPV	L 13–34	12,006
November 2	5:00 p.m.	Colorado State	Mackay Stadium; Reno, NV	CBSSN	L 21–38	16,019
November 9	5:00 p.m.	at No. 12 Boise State	Albertsons Stadium; Boise, ID (rivalry)	FOX	L 21–28	37,143
November 23	7:30 p.m.	Air Force	Mackay Stadium; Reno, NV	FS1	L 19–22	12,228
November 30	5:00 p.m.	at No. 22 UNLV	Allegiant Stadium; Paradise, NV (Fremont Cannon)	CBSSN	L 14–38	40,122
*Non-conference game; Rankings from AP Poll and CFP Rankings released prior to game; All times are in Pacific time

== Game summaries ==
=== vs. SMU ===
Game One – SMU Mustangs (0–0) vs Nevada Wolf Pack (0–0) – Game summary

Quarter	1	2	3	4	Total
Mustangs	0	10	3	16	29
Wolf Pack	7	10	7	0	24

at Mackay Stadium • Reno, NV

- Date: Saturday August 24, 2024
- Game time: 5:00 p.m. PST
- Game weather: Cloudy, 56 °F (13 °C)
- Game attendance: 20,263
- Referee: Adam Savoie
- TV announcers (CBSSN): Rich Waltz (play-by-play), Robert Turbin (analyst), and Amanda Guerra

Game information

First quarter

- (1:07) NEV – Jace Henry 5-yard pass from Brendon Lewis (Matthew Killam kick) (Drive: 3 plays, 9 yards, 1:18; Nevada 7–0)

Second quarter

- (12:57) SMU – LJ Johnson Jr. 1-yard run (Collin Rogers kick) (Drive: 8 plays, 57 yards, 4:19; Tied 7–7)
- (8:38) NEV – Matthew Killam 36-yard field goal (Drive: 9 plays, 75 yards, 3:04; Nevada 10–7)
- (4:12) SMU – Collin Rogers 52-yard field goal (Drive: 5 plays, 21 yards, 1:35; Tied 10–10)
- (0:09) NEV – Cortez Braham 5-yard pass from Brendon Lewis (Matthew Killam kick) (Drive: 10 plays, 81 yards, 3:57; Nevada 17–10)

Third quarter

- (12:18) SMU – Collin Rogers 43-yard field goal (Drive: 9 plays, 49 yards, 2:42; Nevada 17–13)
- (3:23) NEV – Savion Red 1-yard run (Matthew Killam kick) (Drive: 15 plays, 83 yards, 8:50; Nevada 24–13)

Fourth quarter

- (8:01) SMU – Brashard Smith 4-yard run (LJ Johnson Jr. run) (Drive: 8 plays, 98 yards, 2:12; Nevada 24–21)
- (7:19) SMU – Team safety (Nevada 24–23)
- (0:09) SMU – RJ Maryland 34-yard pass from Preston Stone (pass failed) (Drive: 9 plays, 83 yards, 2:13; SMU 29–24)

Statistics	SMU	NEV
First downs	22	16
Total yards	408	298
Rushing yards	34–100	43–148
Passing yards	308	150
Passing: Comp–Att–Int	21–35–1	15–28–0
Time of possession	23:43	36:17

Team	Category	Player	Statistics
SMU	Passing	Preston Stone	17/30, 254 yards, TD, INT
SMU	Rushing	Brashard Smith	11 carries, 67 yards, TD
SMU	Receiving	RJ Maryland	8 receptions, 162 yards, TD
Nevada	Passing	Brendon Lewis	14/26, 132 yards, 2 TD
Nevada	Rushing	Brendon Lewis	18 carries, 77 yards
Nevada	Receiving	Cortez Braham	4 receptions, 66 yards, TD

=== at Troy ===
Game Two – Nevada Wolf Pack (0–1) at Troy Trojans (0–0) – Game summary

Quarter	1	2	3	4	Total
Wolf Pack	0	6	15	7	28
Trojans	7	7	3	9	26

at Veterans Memorial Stadium • Troy, AL

- Date: Saturday, August 31, 2024
- Game time: 7:00 PM EST
- Game weather: Cloudy • Temperature: 89 °F (32 °C) • Wind: N at 4 miles per hour (6.4 km/h)
- Game attendance: 27,412
- Referee: Nolan Dumas
- TV announcers (ESPN+): Will Kollmeyer (play-by-play), Ben Stanfield (analyst), and Junior Louissaint (sideline)

Game information

First quarter

- (3:59) TRO – Damien Taylor 25-yard run, Scott Taylor Renfroe kick (Drive: 11 plays, 84 yards, 4:53; Troy 7–0)

Second quarter

- (3:08) TRO – Gerald Green 16-yard run, Scott Taylor Renfroe kick (Drive: 5 plays, 70 yards, 2:33; Troy 14–0)
- (0:25) NEV – Jace Henry 17-yard pass from Brendon Lewis (Drive: 8 plays, 57 yards, 2:36; Troy 14–6)

Third quarter

- (13:55) NEV – Patrick Garwo III 1-yard run, Jaden Smith pass (Drive: 3 plays, 75 yards, 1:05; Tied 14–14)
- (7:24) TRO – Scott Taylor Renfroe 30-yard field goal (Drive: 13 plays, 69 yards, 6:24; Troy 17–14)
- (3:20) NEV – Patrick Garwo III 22-yard run, Matthew Killam kick (Drive: 7 plays, 79 yards, 3:57; Nevada 21–17)

Fourth quarter

- (12:56) NEV – Marcus Bellon 7-yard pass from Brendon Lewis, Matthew Killam kick (Drive: 6 plays, 36 yards, 3:22; Nevada 28–17)
- (6:12) TRO – Scott Taylor Renfroe 19-yard field goal (Drive: 13 plays, 74 yards, 6:44; Nevada 28–20)
- (0:21) TRO – Devonte Ross 16-yard pass from Goose Crowder (Drive: 9 plays, 75 yards, 1:56; Nevada 28–26)

Statistics	NEV	TROY
First downs	17	24
Total yards	393	391
Rushing yards	214	190
Passing yards	179	201
Passing: Comp–Att–Int	18–21–0	20–30–0
Time of possession	29:35	30:25

Team	Category	Player	Statistics
Nevada	Passing	Brendon Lewis	17/20, 158 yards, 2 TD
Nevada	Rushing	Savion Red	11 carries, 135 yards
Nevada	Receiving	Jaden Smith	6 receptions, 81 yards
Troy	Passing	Goose Crowder	20/30, 201 yards, TD
Troy	Rushing	Damien Taylor	11 carries, 103 yards, TD
Troy	Receiving	Devonte Ross	7 receptions, 103 yards, TD

=== vs. Georgia Southern ===
Game Three – Georgia Southern Eagles (0–1) vs Nevada Wolf Pack (1–1) – Game summary

Quarter	1	2	3	4	Total
Eagles	7	10	3	0	20
Wolf Pack	14	0	3	0	17

at Mackay Stadium • Reno, NV

- Date: Saturday September 7, 2024
- Game time: 7:00 PM EST
- Game weather: Sunny
- Game attendance: 16,245
- Referee: Christian Watson
- TV announcers (TruTV): J. B. Long (play-by-play), Mike Golic Jr. (analyst), and Nabil Karim (sideline)

Game information

First quarter

- (9:33) NEV – Cortez Braham 15-yard pass from Brendon Lewis, Matthew Killam kick (Drive: 10 plays, 85 yards, 5:24; Nevada 7–0)
- (7:30) GASO – Joshua Thompson 35-yard pass from JC French, Gavin Stewart kick (Drive: 5 plays, 65 yards, 2:03; Tied 7–7)
- (1:08) NEV – Brendon Lewis 2-yard run, Matthew Killam kick (Drive: 12 plays, 75 yards, 6:22; Nevada 14–7)

Second quarter

- (12:15) GASO – Gavin Stewart 30-yard field goal (Drive: 11 plays, 63 yards, 3:53; Nevada 14–10)
- (0:03) GASO – Dalen Cobb 24-yard pass from JC French, Gavin Stewart kick (Drive: 8 plays, 80 yards, 1:48; Georgia Southern 17–14)

Third quarter

- (9:07) GASO – Gavin Stewart 48-yard field goal (Drive: 8 plays, 25 yards, 2:12; Georgia Southern 20–14)
- (2:30) NEV – Matthew Killam 27-yard field goal (Drive: 7 plays, 55 yards, 2:36; Georgia Southern 20–17)

Fourth quarter

No scoring plays

Statistics	GASO	NEV
First downs	20	26
Total yards	285	498
Rushing yards	42	227
Passing yards	243	271
Passing: Comp–Att–Int	23–37–0	23–35–0
Time of possession	22:39	37:21

Team	Category	Player	Statistics
Georgia Southern	Passing	JC French	23/37, 243 yards, 2 TD
Georgia Southern	Rushing	OJ Arnold	7 carries, 23 yards
Georgia Southern	Receiving	Dalen Cobb	7 receptions, 81 yards, TD
Nevada	Passing	Brendon Lewis	23/35, 271 yards, TD
Nevada	Rushing	Brendon Lewis	18 carries, 97 yards, TD
Nevada	Receiving	Cortez Braham	9 receptions, 110 yards, TD

=== at Minnesota ===
Game Four – Nevada Wolf Pack (1–2) at Minnesota Golden Gophers (1–1) – Game summary

Quarter	1	2	3	4	Total
Wolf Pack	0	0	0	0	0
Golden Gophers	6	14	7	0	27

at Huntington Bank Stadium • Minneapolis, MN

- Date: Saturday September 14, 2024
- Game time: 3:30 PM EST
- Game weather: Cloudy • Temperature: 72 °F (22 °C) • Wind: S at 10 miles per hour (16 km/h)
- Game attendance: 50,805
- Referee: Tim O'Dey
- TV announcers (BTN): Lisa Byington (play-by-play), Brock Vereen (analyst), and Melanie Ricks (sideline)

Game information

First quarter

- (10:31) MIN – Dragan Kesich 52-yard field goal (Drive: 8 plays, 52 yards, 4:25; Minnesota 3–0)
- (1:47) MIN - Dragan Kesich 21-yard field goal (Drive: 6 plays, 52 yards, 2:56; Minnesota 6–0)

Second quarter

- (4:03) MIN - Darius Taylor 10 yd pass from Brosmer, Max, Dragan Kesich kick (Drive: 2 plays, 16 yards, 0:39; Minnesota 13–0)
- (0:32) MIN - Darius Taylor 4 yd run, Dragan Kesich kick (Drive: 7 plays, 69 yards, 1:23; Minnesota 20–0)

Third quarter

- (8:58) MIN - Darius Taylor 80 yd run, Dragan Kesich kick (Drive: 3 plays, 90 yards, 0:48; Minnesota 27–0)

Fourth quarter

No scoring plays

Statistics	NEV	MINN
First downs	10	20
Total yards	172	386
Rushing yards	58	195
Passing yards	114	191
Passing: Comp–Att–Int	15–22–3	16–26–1
Time of possession	30:47	29:13

Team	Category	Player	Statistics
Nevada	Passing	Brendon Lewis	15/22, 114 yards, 3 INT
Nevada	Rushing	Patrick Garwo III	7 carries, 23 yards
Nevada	Receiving	Jaden Smith	1 reception, 25 yards
Minnesota	Passing	Max Brosmer	16/26, 191 yards, TD, INT
Minnesota	Rushing	Darius Taylor	11 carries, 124 yards, 2 TD
Minnesota	Receiving	Daniel Jackson	4 receptions, 61 yards

=== vs. Eastern Washington (FCS) ===
Game Five – Eastern Washington Eagles (FCS) (1–2) vs Nevada Wolf Pack (1–3) – Game summary

Quarter	1	2	3	4	Total
Eagles (FCS)	0	3	0	13	16
Wolf Pack	14	7	14	14	49

at Mackay Stadium • Reno, NV

- Date: Saturday September 21, 2024
- Game time: 3:00 PM EST
- Game weather: Sunny • Temperature: 72 °F (22 °C) • Wind: E at 2 miles per hour (3.2 km/h)
- Game attendance: 16,399
- Referee: Michael Cuttone
- TV announcers (NSN/Mountain West Network): Alex Margulies (play-by-play) and Shannon Kelly (sideline reporter)

Game information

First quarter

- (6:46) NEV - Patrick Garwo III 9 yd run, Matthew Killam kick (Drive: 9 plays, 73 yards, 4:58; Nevada 7–0)
- (1:48) NEV - Marcus Bellon 4 yd pass from Brendon Lewis, Matthew Killam kick (Drive: 7 plays, 58 yards, 4:04; Nevada 14–0)

Second quarter

- (9:19) EWU - Soren McKee 19–yard field goal (Drive: 15 plays, 74 yards, 7:29; Nevada 14–3)
- (0:48) NEV - Patrick Garwo III 7 yd run, Matthew Killam kick (Drive: 8 plays, 75 yards, 1:24; Nevada 21–3)

Third quarter

- (9:43) NEV - Patrick Garwo III 1 yd run, Matthew Killam kick (Drive: 10 plays, 75 yards, 5:17; Nevada 28–3)
- (0:43) NEV - Jaden Smith 24 yd pass from Brendon Lewis, Matthew Killam kick (Drive: 12 plays, 65 yards, 5:27; Nevada 35–3)

Fourth quarter

- (12:33) EWU - Malik Dotson 2 yd run, rush fail (Drive: 8 plays, 75 yards, 3:10; Nevada 35–9)
- (9:46) NEV - Savion Red 31 yd run, Matthew Killam kick (Drive: 5 plays, 75 yards, 2:44; Nevada 42–9)
- (8:24) EWU - Noah Cronquist 42 Yd pass from Michael Wortham, Soren McKee kick (Drive: 4 plays, 86 yards, 1:18; Nevada 42–16)
- (1:46) NEV - Savion Red 3 yd run, Matthew Killam kick (Drive: 12 plays, 80 yards, 6:32; Nevada 49–16)

Statistics	EWU	NEV
First downs	21	27
Total yards	348	534
Rushing yards	170	320
Passing yards	178	214
Passing: Comp–Att–Int	21-30-1	18-24-1
Time of possession	26:50	33:10

Team	Category	Player	Statistics
Eastern Washington	Passing	Kekoa Visperas	15/22, 116 yards
Eastern Washington	Rushing	Jared Taylor	12 carries, 73 yards
Eastern Washington	Receiving	Efton Chism III	11 receptions, 85 yards
Nevada	Passing	Brendon Lewis	16/22, 193 yards, 2 TD, INT
Nevada	Rushing	Savion Red	10 carries, 117 yards, 2 TD
Nevada	Receiving	Marcus Bellon	5 receptions, 83 yards, TD

=== at San Jose State ===
Game Six – Nevada Wolf Pack (2–3) at San Jose State Spartans (3–1) – Game summary

Quarter	1	2	3	4	Total
Wolf Pack	7	14	7	3	31
Spartans	7	14	7	7	35

at CEFCU Stadium • San Jose, CA

- Date: Saturday October 5, 2024
- Game time: 7:30 PM EST
- Game weather: Sunny
- Game attendance: 17,099
- Referee: Cal McNeill
- TV announcers (TruTV): Ari Wolfe (play-by-play), Darius Walker (analyst), and Bridget Howard (sideline)

Game information

First quarter
Second quarter
Third quarter
Fourth quarter

Statistics	NEV	SJSU
First downs		
Total yards		
Rushing yards		
Passing yards		
Passing: Comp–Att–Int		
Time of possession		

Team	Category	Player	Statistics
Nevada	Passing		
Nevada	Rushing		
Nevada	Receiving		
San Jose State	Passing		
San Jose State	Rushing		
San Jose State	Receiving		

=== vs. Oregon State ===
Game Seven – Oregon State Beavers (4–1) vs Nevada Wolf Pack (2–4) – Game summary

Quarter	1	2	3	4	Total
Beavers	7	10	7	13	37
Wolf Pack	7	7	7	21	42

at Mackay Stadium • Reno, NV

- Date: Saturday October 12, 2024
- Game time: 7:30 PM EST
- Game weather: Sunny • Temperature: 72 °F (22 °C) • Wind: W at 7 miles per hour (11 km/h)
- Game attendance: 21,541
- Referee: Kenneth Ray
- TV announcers (CBSSN): John Sadak (play-by-play), Ross Tucker (analyst), and Tiffany Blackmon (sideline)

Game information

First quarter

- (10:48) OSU – Jake Reichle 3-yard run, Everett Hayes kick (Drive: 8 plays, 75 yards, 4:12; Oregon State 7–0)
- (7:51) NEV – Savion Red 33-yard run, Matthew Killam kick (Drive: 6 plays, 75 yards, 2:57; Tied 7–7)

Second quarter

- (10:44) NEV – Savion Red 5-yard run, Matthew Killam kick (Drive: 13 plays, 78 yards, 6:36; Nevada 14–7)
- (5:53) OSU – Everett Hayes 22-yard field goal (Drive: 10 plays, 71 yards, 4:51; Nevada 14–10)
- (0:38) OSU – Anthony Hankerson 18-yard run, Everett Hayes kick (Drive: 5 plays, 68 yards, 1:04; Oregon State 17–14)

Third quarter

- (11:04) OSU – Anthony Hankerson 8-yard run, Everett Hayes kick (Drive: 6 plays, 67 yards, 2:27; Oregon State 24–14)
- (5:58) NEV – Savion Red 7-yard run, Matthew Killam kick (Drive: 9 plays, 75 yards, 5:06; Oregon State 24–21)

Fourth quarter

- (13:37) NEV – Savion Red 6-yard run, Matthew Killam kick (Drive: 6 plays, 69 yards, 2:53; Nevada 28–24)
- (10:43) NEV – Kitan Crawford 52-yard interception, Matthew Killam kick (Nevada 35–24)
- (6:59) OSU – Anthony Hankerson 1-yard run (Drive: 11 plays, 75 yards, 3:44; Nevada 35–30)
- (3:57) NEV – Brendon Lewis 67-yard run, Matthew Killam kick (Drive: 3 plays, 80 yards, 1:03; Nevada 42–30)
- (1:57) OSU – Trent Walker 3-yard pass from Gevani McCoy, Everett Hayes kick (Drive: 8 plays, 75 yards, 2:01; Nevada 42–37)

Statistics	OSU	NEV
First downs	35	20
Total yards	562	422
Rushing yards	214	353
Passing yards	348	69
Passing: Comp–Att–Int	27–42–4	6–13–0
Time of possession	33:57	26:03

Team	Category	Player	Statistics
Oregon State	Passing	Gevani McCoy	27/42, 348 yards, TD, 4 INT
Oregon State	Rushing	Anthony Hankerson	28 carries, 154 yards, 3 TD
Oregon State	Receiving	Trent Walker	7 receptions, 96 yards, TD
Nevada	Passing	Brendon Lewis	5/12, 51 yards
Nevada	Rushing	Brendon Lewis	9 carries, 151 yards, TD
Nevada	Receiving	Brendon Lewis	1 reception, 18 yards

Nevada advanced to 3–4 on the season. Wolf Pack quarterback Brendon Lewis had the rare stat line where he led the team in passing, rushing and receiving yards. He ran for a career high 151 yards on nine attempts. His 18 yard reception came on a double pass from backup quarterback Chubba Purdy. Running back Savion Red also ran for a career high 137 yards and four touchdowns.

=== vs. Fresno State ===
Game Eight – Fresno State Bulldogs (3–3) vs Nevada Wolf Pack (3–4) – Game summary

Quarter	1	2	3	4	Total
Bulldogs	3	14	7	0	24
Wolf Pack	7	14	0	0	21

at Mackay Stadium • Reno, NV

- Date: Friday October 18, 2024
- Game time: 10:30 PM EST
- Game weather: Clear • Temperature: 44 °F (7 °C) • Wind: SW at 7 miles per hour (11 km/h)
- Game attendance: 18,319
- Referee: Jonathan Noli
- TV announcers (CBSSN): John Sadak (play-by-play) and Taylor McHargue (analyst)

Game information

First quarter

- (11:03) NEV – Savion Red 3-yard run, Matthew Killam kick (Drive: 6 plays, 75 yards, 3:57; Nevada 7–0)
- (5:42) FRES – Dylan Lynch 44-yard field goal (Drive: 10 plays, 49 yards, 5:21; Nevada 7–3)

Second quarter

- (12:32) FRES – Elijah Gilliam 10-yard run, Dylan Lynch kick (Drive: 12 plays, 86 yards, 5:33; Fresno State 10–7)
- (9:49) NEV – Nate Burleson II 46-yard pass from Brendon Lewis, Matthew Killam kick (Drive: 4 plays, 68 yards, 2:25; Nevada 14–10)
- (5:45) FRES – Elijah Gilliam 4-yard run, Dylan Lynch kick (Drive: 3 plays, 16 yards, 0:59; Fresno State 17–14)
- (0:10) NEV – Brendon Lewis 2-yard run, Matthew Killam kick (Drive: 14 plays, 83 yards, 5:36; Nevada 21–17)

Third quarter

- (4:13) FRES – Joshua Wood 7-yard run, Dylan Lynch kick (Drive: 6 plays, 95 yards, 2:27; Fresno State 24–21)

Fourth quarter

- No scoring plays

Statistics	FRES	NEV
First downs	16	16
Total yards	316	295
Rushing yards	126	84
Passing yards	190	211
Passing: Comp–Att–Int	13–20–1	16–25–0
Time of possession	27:39	32:10

Team	Category	Player	Statistics
Fresno State	Passing	Mikey Keene	13/20, 190 yards, INT
Fresno State	Rushing	Elijah Gilliam	20 carries, 66 yards, 2 TD
Fresno State	Receiving	Ellijah Gilliam	2 receptions, 74 yards
Nevada	Passing	Brendon Lewis	13/19, 158 yards, TD
Nevada	Rushing	Savion Red	13 carries, 56 yards, TD
Nevada	Receiving	Jaden Smith	9 receptions, 134 yards

=== at Hawaii ===
Game Nine – Nevada Wolf Pack (3–5) at Hawaii Rainbow Warriors (2–5) – Game summary

Quarter	1	2	3	4	Total
Wolf Pack	0	0	7	6	13
Rainbow Warriors	14	3	7	10	34

at Clarence T.C. Ching Athletics Complex • Honolulu, HI

- Date: Saturday October 26, 2024
- Game time: 8:59 PM PST
- Game weather: Sunny • Temperature: 77 °F (25 °C) • Wind: NE 12 miles per hour (19 km/h)
- Game attendance: 12,006
- Referee: Christian Watson
- TV announcers (SPEC PPV): Kanoa Leahey (play-by-play), Rich Miano (analyst), and Jordan Hellie (sideline)

Game information

First quarter
Second quarter
Third quarter
Fourth quarter

Statistics	NEV	HAW
First downs		
Total yards		
Rushing yards		
Passing yards		
Passing: Comp–Att–Int		
Time of possession		

Team	Category	Player	Statistics
Nevada	Passing		
Nevada	Rushing		
Nevada	Receiving		
Hawaii	Passing		
Hawaii	Rushing		
Hawaii	Receiving		

=== vs. Colorado State ===
Game Ten – Colorado State Rams (5–3) vs Nevada Wolf Pack (3–6) – Game summary

Quarter	1	2	3	4	Total
Rams	14	3	11	10	38
Wolf Pack	0	0	7	14	21

at Mackay Stadium • Reno, NV

- Date: Saturday November 2, 2024
- Game time: 4:00 PM PST
- Game weather: Cloudy, 50 °F (10 °C)
- Game attendance: 16,019
- Referee: Patrick Foy
- TV announcers (CBSSN): Chris Lewis (play-by-play) and Robert Turbin (analyst)

Game information

First quarter

- CSU – Avery Morrow 7-yard run (Jordan Noyes kick), 10:40. Rams 7–0. Drive: 7 plays, 67 yards, 4:14.
- CSU – Justin Marshall 8-yard run (Jordan Noyes kick), 2:20. Rams 14–0. Drive: 7 plays, 80 yards, 4:27.

Second quarter

- CSU – Jordan Noyes 60-yard field goal, 5:27. Rams 17–0. Drive: 4 plays, -2 yards, 1:40.

Third quarter

- CSU – Jordan Noyes 21-yard field goal, 11:30. Rams 20–0. Drive: 8 plays, 28 yards, 3:16.
- CSU – Jace Bellah 0-yard fumble return (Brayden Fowler-Nicolosi pass to Jamari Person), 11:17. Rams 28–0.
- NEV – Brendon Lewis 3-yard run (Kian Afrookhteh kick), 7:53. Rams 28–7. Drive: 6 plays, 75 yards, 3:34.

Fourth quarter

- NEV – Brendon Lewis 3-yard run (Kian Afrookhteh kick), 12:16. Rams 28–14. Drive: 12 plays, 95 yards, 6:07.
- CSU – Avery Morrow 15-yard run (Jordan Noyes kick), 8:42. Rams 35–14. Drive: 6 plays, 59 yards, 3:34.
- NEV – Jaden Smith 13-yard pass from Brendon Lewis (Kian Afrookhteh kick), 4:22. Rams 35–21. Drive: 15 plays, 77 yards, 4:15.
- CSU – Jordan Noyes 35-yard field goal, 1:11. Rams 38–21. Drive: 8 plays, 26 yards, 3:11.

Statistics	CSU	NEV
First downs	15	22
Total yards	327	441
Rushing yards	170	189
Passing yards	157	252
Passing: Comp–Att–Int	9–16–0	20–28–0
Time of possession	28:58	28:53

Team	Category	Player	Statistics
Colorado State	Passing	Brayden Fowler-Nicolosi	9/15, 157 yards
Colorado State	Rushing	Avery Morrow	18 carries, 77 yards, 2 TD
Colorado State	Receiving	Caleb Goodie	2 receptions, 66 yards
Nevada	Passing	Brendon Lewis	20/28, 252 yards, TD
Nevada	Rushing	Brendon Lewis	14 carries, 109 yards, 2 TD
Nevada	Receiving	Cortez Braham Jr.	9 receptions, 141 yards

=== at No. 12 Boise State (rivalry) ===
Game Eleven – Nevada Wolf Pack (3–7) at No. 12 Boise State Broncos (7–1) – Game summary

Quarter	1	2	3	4	Total
Wolf Pack	7	7	0	7	21
No. 12 Broncos	14	0	7	7	28

at Albertsons Stadium • Boise, ID

- Date: Saturday November 9, 2024
- Game time: 5:00 p.m.
- Game weather: Clear • Temperature: 50 °F (10 °C) • Wind: SW 6 miles per hour (9.7 km/h)
- Game attendance: 37,143
- Referee: Jonathan Noli
- TV announcers (FOX): Tim Brando (play-by-play), Devin Gardner (analyst), and Josh Sims (sideline)

Game information

First quarter

- (7:36) BSU - Matt Lauter 11-yard pass from Maddux Madsen, Jonah Dalmas kick (Drive: 12 plays, 68 yards, 5:56; Boise State 7-0)
- (4:12) BSU - Ashton Jeanty 4-yard run, Jonah Dalmas kick (Drive: 4 plays, 54 yards, 1:28; Boise State 14-0)
- (0:57) NEV - Brendon Lewis 17-yard run, Kian Afrookhteh kick (Drive: 6 plays, 75 yards, 3:15; Boise State 14-7)

Second quarter

- (6:14) NEV - Caleb Ramseur 44-yard pass from Marcus Bellon, Kian Afrookhteh kick (Drive: 7 plays, 66 yards, 4:05; Tied 14-14)

Third quarter

- (10:50) BSU - Ashton Jeanty 1-yard run, Jonah Dalmas kick (Drive: 8 plays, 95 yards, 4:07; Boise State 21-14)

Fourth quarter

- (10:05) BSU - Ashton Jeanty 2-yard run, Jonah Dalmas kick (Drive: 10 plays, 62 yards, 3:58; Boise State 28-14)
- (2:19) NEV - Jaden Smith 36-yard pass from Brendon Lewis, Kian Afrookhteh kick (Drive: 4 plays, 64 yards, 1:06; Boise State 28-21)

Statistics	NEV	BSU
First downs	13	21
Total yards	319	393
Rushing yards	87	274
Passing yards	232	119
Passing: Comp–Att–Int	18–27–0	9–20–1
Time of possession	28:45	31:15

Team	Category	Player	Statistics
Nevada	Passing	Brendon Lewis	17/26, 188 yards, TD
Nevada	Rushing	Sean Dollars	15 carries, 38 yards
Nevada	Receiving	Jaden Smith	4 receptions, 57 yards, TD
Boise State	Passing	Maddux Madsen	9/20, 119 yards, TD, INT
Boise State	Rushing	Ashton Jeanty	34 carries, 209 yards, 3 TD
Boise State	Receiving	Matt Lauter	5 receptions, 61 yards, TD

=== vs. Air Force ===
Game Twelve – Air Force Falcons (3–7) vs Nevada Wolf Pack (3–8) – Game summary

Quarter	1	2	3	4	Total
Falcons	0	0	0	0	0
Wolf Pack	0	0	0	0	0

at Mackay Stadium • Reno, NV

- Date: Saturday November 23, 2024
- Game time: 7:30 p.m.
- Game weather: 0 °F (−18 °C)
- TV announcers (FS1): Trent Rush (play-by-play) and Petros Papadakis (analyst)

Game information

First quarter
Second quarter
Third quarter
Fourth quarter

Statistics	AFA	NEV
First downs		
Total yards		
Rushing yards		
Passing yards		
Passing: Comp–Att–Int		
Time of possession		

Team	Category	Player	Statistics
Air Force	Passing		
Air Force	Rushing		
Air Force	Receiving		
Nevada	Passing		
Nevada	Rushing		
Nevada	Receiving		

=== at No. 22 UNLV (Fremont Cannon) ===
Game Thirteen – Nevada Wolf Pack (3–9) at No. 22 UNLV Rebels (9–2) – Game summary

Quarter	1	2	3	4	Total
Wolf Pack	7	0	0	7	14
No. 22 Rebels	10	14	7	7	38

at Allegiant Stadium • Paradise, NV

- Date: Saturday November 30, 2024
- Game time: 5:00 PM PST
- Game weather: None (Indoor stadium)
- Game attendance: 40,122
- Referee: Cal McNeill
- TV announcers (CBSSN): John Sadak (play-by-play), Robert Turbin (analyst) and Emily Proud (sideline reporter)

Game information

First quarter

- (12:42) UNLV – Kaleo Ballungay 1-yard pass from Hajj-Malik Williams, Caden Chittenden kick (Drive: 6 plays, 69 yards, 2:11; UNLV 7–0)
- (10:03) NEV – Cortez Braham 45-yard pass from Brendon Lewis, Kian Afrookhteh kick (Drive: 6 plays, 75 yards, 2:39; Tied 7–7)
- (5:50) UNLV – Caden Chittenden 26-yard field goal (Drive: 9 plays, 62 yards, 4:07; UNLV 10–7)

Second quarter

- (14:05) UNLV – Jackson Woodard 0-yard fumble recovery, Caden Chittenden kick (UNLV 17–7)
- (4:53) UNLV – Jai'Den Thomas 1-yard run, Caden Chittenden kick (Drive: 11 plays, 72 yards, 5:46; UNLV 24–7)

Third quarter

- (6:00) UNLV – Hajj-Malik Williams 13-yard run, Caden Chittenden kick (Drive: 11 plays, 81 yards, 5:19; UNLV 31–7)

Fourth quarter

- (11:53) UNLV – Ricky White III 17-yard pass from Hajj-Malik Williams, Caden Chittenden kick (Drive: 7 plays, 76 yards, 2:58; UNLV 38–7)
- (1:19) NEV – Jaden Smith 20-yard pass from Brendon Lewis, Kian Afrookteh kick (Drive: 10 plays, 89 yards, 3:27; UNLV 38–7)

Statistics	NEV	UNLV
First downs	22	28
Total yards	359	519
Rushing yards	67	351
Passing yards	292	168
Passing: Comp–Att–Int	27–38–1	14–21–0
Time of possession	30:41	29:19

Team	Category	Player	Statistics
Nevada	Passing	Brendon Lewis	27/37, 292 yards, 2 TD, INT
Nevada	Rushing	Brendon Lewis	16 carries, 30 yards
Nevada	Receiving	Jaden Smith	9 receptions, 92 yards, TD
UNLV	Passing	Hajj-Malik Williams	14/21, 168 yards, 2 TD
UNLV	Rushing	Jai'Den Thomas	15 carries, 135 yards, TD
UNLV	Receiving	Jacob De Jesus	6 receptions, 84 yards
