= 2024 Colorado State Rams football team =

American college football season

2024 Colorado State Rams football

Arizona Bowl, L 17–43 vs. Miami (OH)
- Conference: Mountain West Conference
- Record: 8–5 (6–1 MW)
- Head coach: Jay Norvell (3rd season)
- Offensive coordinator: Matt Mumme (3rd season)
- Offensive scheme: West Coast
- Defensive coordinator: Freddie Banks (3rd season)
- Base defense: 4–2–5
- Home stadium: Canvas Stadium

Uniform
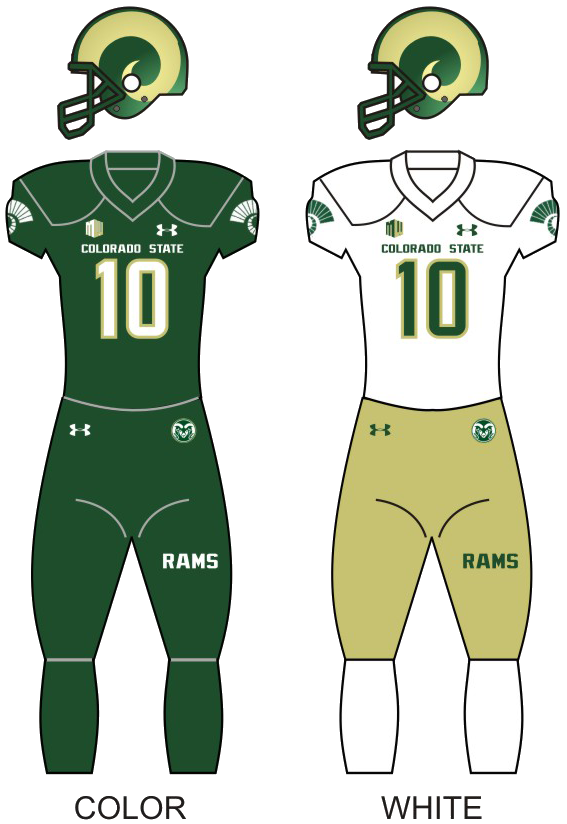

2024 Mountain West Conference football standings
	Conf.			Overall
Team	W		L	W		L
No. 8 Boise State y$^	7	–	0	12	–	2
No. 23 UNLV y	6	–	1	11	–	3
Colorado State	6	–	1	8	–	5
Fresno State	4	–	3	6	–	7
San Jose State	3	–	4	7	–	6
Air Force	3	–	4	5	–	7
Hawaii	3	–	4	5	–	7
New Mexico	3	–	4	5	–	7
Utah State	3	–	4	4	–	8
San Diego State	2	–	5	3	–	9
Wyoming	2	–	5	3	–	9
Nevada	0	–	7	3	–	10
Championship: Boise State 21, UNLV 7
^ – College Football Playoff participant; $ – Conference champion; y – Championship game participant; Rankings from AP Poll

The 2024 Colorado State Rams football team represented Colorado State University as a member of the Mountain West Conference (MW) during the 2024 NCAA Division I FBS football season. They were led by third-year head coach Jay Norvell, the Rams played their home games at Canvas Stadium located in Fort Collins, Colorado.

After a victory over Nevada on November 2, the Rams became bowl eligible for the first time since 2017. The Rams were invited to the Arizona Bowl, where they played Miami (OH) and lost 43-17.

== Preseason ==
=== Mountain West media poll ===
The Mountain West's preseason prediction poll was released on July 10, 2024. Colorado State was predicted to finish fifth.

== Schedule ==
Date	Time	Opponent	Site	TV	Result	Attendance
August 31	1:30 p.m.	at No. 4 Texas*	Darrell K Royal–Texas Memorial Stadium; Austin, TX	ESPN	L 0–52	99,171
September 7	5:00 p.m.	Northern Colorado*	Canvas Stadium; Fort Collins, CO	Altitude	W 38–17	36,573
September 14	5:30 p.m.	Colorado*	Canvas Stadium; Fort Collins, CO (Rocky Mountain Showdown)	CBS	L 9–28	40,099
September 21	3:00 p.m.	UTEP*	Canvas Stadium; Fort Collins, CO	TruTV	W 27–17	29,151
October 5	4:30 p.m.	at Oregon State*	Reser Stadium; Corvallis, OR	The CW	L 31–39 ^{2OT}	36,433
October 12	1:30 p.m.	San Jose State	Canvas Stadium; Fort Collins, CO	TruTV	W 31–24	27,280
October 19	6:00 p.m.	at Air Force	Falcon Stadium; Colorado Springs, CO (rivalry)	CBSSN	W 21–13	27,598
October 26	3:00 p.m.	New Mexico^{†}	Canvas Stadium; Fort Collins, CO	Altitude	W 17–6	36,980
November 2	5:00 p.m.	at Nevada	Mackay Stadium; Reno, NV	CBSSN	W 38–21	16,019
November 15	6:00 p.m.	Wyoming	Canvas Stadium; Fort Collins, CO (Border War)	CBSSN	W 24–10	36,720
November 23	8:30 p.m.	at Fresno State	Valley Children's Stadium; Fresno, CA	CBSSN	L 22–28	39,543
November 29	1:30 p.m.	Utah State	Canvas Stadium; Fort Collins, CO	FS1	W 42–37	24,772
December 28	2:30 p.m.	vs. Miami (OH)*	Arizona Stadium; Tucson, AZ (Arizona Bowl)	The CW	L 17–43	40,076
*Non-conference game; ^{†}Homecoming; Rankings from AP Poll (and CFP Rankings, after October 31) - released prior to game; All times are in Mountain time

== Game summaries ==
=== at No. 4 Texas ===
Colorado State Rams at No. 4 Texas Longhorns – Game summary

Quarter	1	2	3	4	Total
Rams	0	0	0	0	0
No. 4 Longhorns	7	24	14	7	52

at Darrell K Royal–Texas Memorial Stadium, Austin, Texas

- Date: August 31
- Game time: 1:30 p.m. MDT/2:30 p.m. CDT
- Game weather: Sunny
- Game attendance: 99,171
- Referee: David Smith
- TV announcers (ESPN): Mike Monaco (play-by-play), Kirk Morrison (analyst), and Dawn Davenport (sideline)

Game information

First quarter

- (9:36) TEX – Quintrevion Wisner 3-yard run, Bert Auburn kick (Drive: 4 plays, 64 yards, 1:43; Texas 7–0)

Second quarter

- (10:56) TEX – Bert Auburn 45-yard field goal (Drive: 4 plays, 4 yards, 1:45; Texas 10–0)
- (5:50) TEX – Matthew Golden 1-yard pass from Quinn Ewers, Bert Auburn kick (Drive: 7 plays, 70 yards, 2:50; Texas 17–0)
- (1:55) TEX – Isaiah Bond 7-yard pass from Quinn Ewers, Bert Auburn kick (Drive: 5 plays, 43 yards, 1:37; Texas 24–0)
- (0:12) TEX – Matthew Golden 11-yard pass from Quinn Ewers, Bert Auburn kick (Drive: 5 plays, 33 yards, 0:46; Texas 31–0)

Third quarter

- (6:47) TEX – Jerrick Gibson 5-yard run, Bert Auburn kick (Drive: 8 plays, 80 yards, 3:35; Texas 38–0)
- (2:23) TEX – Silas Bolden 5-yard pass from Arch Manning, Bert Auburn kick (Drive: 4 plays, 49 yards, 1:41; Texas 45–0)

Fourth quarter

- (10:10) TEX – Arch Manning 1-yard run, Bert Auburn kick (Drive: 11 plays, 55 yards, 4:41; Texas 52–0)

Statistics	CSU	TEX
First downs	11	26
Total yards	192	545
Rushing yards	118	190
Passing yards	74	355
Turnovers	2	1
Time of possession	29:17	30:43

Team	Category	Player	Statistics
Colorado State	Passing	Brayden Fowler-Nicolosi	10/18, 59 yards, INT
Colorado State	Rushing	Justin Marshall	25 carries, 106 yards
Colorado State	Receiving	Tory Horton	5 receptions, 31 yards
Texas	Passing	Quinn Ewers	20/27, 260 yards, 3 TD, INT
Texas	Rushing	Jerrick Gibson	10 carries, 67 yards, TD
Texas	Receiving	Ryan Wingo	4 receptions, 70 yards

=== Northern Colorado ===
Northern Colorado Bears at Colorado State Rams – Game summary

Quarter	1	2	3	4	Total
Bears	7	0	7	3	17
Rams	10	14	7	7	38

at Canvas Stadium, Fort Collins, Colorado

- Date: September 7
- Game time: 5:00 p.m. MDT
- Game weather: Sunny, 84 °F (29 °C)
- Game attendance: 36,573
- Referee: Nolan Dumas
- TV announcers (Altitude): Brian Roth (play-by-play) and Mike Sanford Jr. (analyst)

Game information
First quarter
- CSU – Tory Horton 78-yard punt return (Jordan Noyes kick), 13:18. Rams 7–0.
- CSU – Jordan Noyes 20-yard field goal, 7:14. Rams 10–0. Drive: 7 plays, 84 yards, 3:26.
- UNCO – Fisher Clements 9-yard pass from Peter Costelli (Hunter Green kick), 0:45. Rams 10–7. Drive: 4 plays, 33 yards, 1:23.

Second quarter

- CSU – Brayden Fowler-Nicolosi 2-yard run (Jordan Noyes kick), 10:23. Rams 17–7. Drive: 10 plays, 75 yards, 5:22.
- CSU – Keegan Holles 4-yard run (Jordan Noyes kick), 0:29. Rams 24–7. Drive: 14 plays, 58 yards, 6:22.

Third quarter

- UNCO – Brayden Munroe 50-yard pass from Peter Costelli (Hunter Green kick), 12:13. Rams 24–14. Drive: 5 plays, 78 yards, 2:27.
- CSU – Caleb Goodie 40-yard pass from Brayden Fowler-Nicolosi (Jordan Noyes kick), 8:01. Rams 31–14. Drive: 3 plays, 80 yards, 1:22.

Fourth quarter

- UNCO – Hunter Green 53-yard field goal, 4:11. Rams 31–17. Drive: 9 plays, 46 yards, 3:34.
- CSU – Avery Morrow 8-yard run (Jordan Noyes kick), 0:43. Rams 38–17. Drive: 7 plays, 44 yards, 3:27.

Statistics	UNC	CSU
First downs	13	21
Total yards	298	426
Rushing yards	107	224
Passing yards	191	202
Turnovers	0	1
Time of possession	27:54	32:06

Team	Category	Player	Statistics
Northern Colorado	Passing	Peter Costelli	11/22, 187 yards, 2 TD
Northern Colorado	Rushing	Peter Costelli	10 rushes, 32 yards
Northern Colorado	Receiving	Brayden Munroe	3 receptions, 86 yards, TD
Colorado State	Passing	Brayden Fowler-Nicolosi	18/27, 202 yards, TD
Colorado State	Rushing	Keegan Holles	10 rushes, 89 yards, TD
Colorado State	Receiving	Tory Horton	3 receptions, 65 yards

=== Colorado ===
Colorado Buffaloes at Colorado State Rams – Game summary

Quarter	1	2	3	4	Total
Buffaloes	0	14	7	7	28
Rams	3	0	0	6	9

at Canvas Stadium, Fort Collins, Colorado

- Date: September 14
- Game time: 5:30 p.m. MDT
- Game weather: Sunny; 87 °F (31 °C)
- Game attendance: 40,099
- Referee: Jonathan Noli
- TV announcers (CBS): Rich Waltz (play-by-play), Ross Tucker (analyst), Tiffany Blackmon (sideline)

Game information

First quarter

- (07:21) CSU – Jordan Noyes 25-yard field goal (Drive: 8 plays, 48 yards, 04:39; Colorado State 3–0)

Second quarter

- (05:51) COL – LaJohntay Wester 4-yard pass from Shedeur Sanders, Alejandro Mata kick (Drive: 12 plays, 85 yards, 05:51; Colorado 7–3)
- (00:58) COL – LaJohntay Wester 34-yard pass from Shedeur Sanders, Alejandro Mata kick (Drive: 9 plays, 84 yards, 02:33; Colorado 14–3)

Third quarter

- (10:11) COL – Travis Hunter 2-yard pass from Shedeur Sanders, Alejandro Mata kick (Drive: 2 plays, 12 yards, 00:31; Colorado 21–3)

Fourth quarter

- (13:20) COL – Travis Hunter 21-yard pass from Shedeur Sanders, Alejandro Mata kick (Drive: 5 plays, 55 yards, 01:58; Colorado 28–3)
- (09:58) CSU – Justin Marshall 5-yard run (Drive: 6 plays, 75 yards, 03:22; Colorado 28–9)

Statistics	COLO	CSU
First downs	23	17
Total yards	419	340
Rushing yards	109	130
Passing yards	310	209
Turnovers	1	4
Time of possession	30:07	29:53

Team	Category	Player	Statistics
Colorado	Passing	Shedeur Sanders	36/49, 310 yards, 4 TD
Colorado	Rushing	Micah Welch	9 rushes, 65 yards
Colorado	Receiving	Travis Hunter	10 receptions, 110 yards
Colorado State	Passing	Brayden Fowler-Nicolosi	23/30, 185 yards, TD
Colorado State	Rushing	Avery Morrow	3 rushes, 67 yards
Colorado State	Receiving	Jamari Person	7 receptions, 51 yards

=== UTEP ===
UTEP Miners at Colorado State Rams – Game summary

Quarter	1	2	3	4	Total
Miners	0	3	7	7	17
Rams	7	7	10	3	27

at Canvas Stadium, Fort Collins, Colorado

- Date: September 21
- Game time: 3:00 p.m. MDT
- Game weather: Sunny, 70 °F (21 °C)
- Game attendance: 29,151
- Referee: Douglas Mercer
- TV announcers (TruTV): J. B. Long (play-by-play) and Mike Golic Jr. (analyst)

Game information
First quarter
- CSU – Avery Morrow 2-yard run (Jordan Noyes kick), 8:52. Rams 7–0. Drive: 12 plays, 75 yards, 6:08.

Second quarter

- UTEP – Buzz Flabiano 45-yard field goal, 6:12. Rams 7–3. Drive: 4 plays, 1 yard, 1:28.
- CSU – Avery Morrow 73-yard run (Jordan Noyes kick), 5:24. Rams 14–3. Drive: 2 plays, 80 yards, 0:44.

Third quarter

- CSU – Armani Winfield 5-yard pass from Brayden Fowler-Nicolosi (Jordan Noyes kick), 11:54. Rams 21–3. Drive: 3 plays, 7 yards, 0:53.
- CSU – Jordan Noyes 37-yard field goal, 7:32. Rams 24–3. Drive: 8 plays, 42 yards, 3:40.
- UTEP – Kenny Odom 28-yard pass from Cade McConnell (Buzz Flabiano kick), 4:26. Rams 24–10. Drive: 7 plays, 75 yards, 3:06.

Fourth quarter

- UTEP – Kenny Odom 55-yard pass from Cade McConnell (Buzz Flabiano kick), 14:51. Rams 24–17. Drive: 9 plays, 92 yards, 2:49.
- CSU – Jordan Noyes 39-yard field goal, 1:32. Rams 27–17. Drive: 10 plays, 28 yards, 5:43.

Statistics	UTEP	CSU
First downs	15	14
Total yards	324	356
Rushing yards	48	224
Passing yards	276	132
Turnovers	1	1
Time of possession	26:42	33:18

Team	Category	Player	Statistics
UTEP	Passing	Cade McConnell	19/29, 220 yards, 2 TD
UTEP	Rushing	Jevon Jackson	10 rushes, 35 yards
UTEP	Receiving	Kenny Odom	7 receptions, 128 yards, 2 TD
Colorado State	Passing	Brayden Fowler-Nicolosi	14/22, 132 yards, TD, INT
Colorado State	Rushing	Avery Morrow	21 rushes, 156 yards, 2 TD
Colorado State	Receiving	Jordan Ross	1 reception, 36 yards

=== at Oregon State ===
Colorado State Rams at Oregon State Beavers – Game summary

Quarter	1	2	3	4	OT	2OT	Total
Rams	7	3	0	14	7	0	31
Beavers	0	14	0	10	7	8	39

at Reser Stadium, Corvallis, Oregon

- Date: October 5
- Game time: 4:30 p.m. MDT/3:30 p.m. PDT
- Game weather: Sunny, 70 °F (21 °C)
- Game attendance: 36,433
- Referee: Chris Wiggins
- TV announcers (The CW): Ted Robinson (play-by-play) and Ryan Leaf (analyst)

Game information
First quarter
- CSU – Justin Marshall 12-yard run (Jordan Noyes kick), 10:15. Rams 7–0. Drive: 1 play, 12 yards, 0:07.

Second quarter

- ORST – Gevani McCoy 29-yard run (Everett Hayes kick), 11:04. Tied 7–7. Drive: 10 plays, 82 yards, 4:44.
- CSU – Jordan Noyes 25-yard field goal, 5:13. Rams 10–7. Drive: 10 plays, 68 yards, 5:51.
- ORST – Anthony Hankerson 1-yard run (Everett Hayes kick), 0:03. Beavers 14–10. Drive: 13 plays, 70 yards, 5:01.

Third quarter

- No scoring plays

Fourth quarter

- ORST – Gevani McCoy 7-yard run (Everett Hayes kick), 14:52. Beavers 21–10. Drive: 14 plays, 87 yards, 8:51.
- CSU – Tory Horton 10-yard pass from Brayden Fowler-Nicolosi (pass failed), 7:59. Beavers 21–16. Drive: 14 plays, 75 yards, 6:53.
- CSU – Avery Morrow 1-yard run (Tory Horton run), 1:56. Rams 24–21. Drive: 6 plays, 81 yards, 3:03.
- ORST – Everett Hayes 44-yard field goal, 0:20. Tied 24–24. Drive: 14 plays, 52 yards, 1:30.

Overtime

- CSU – Caleb Goodie 17-yard pass from Brayden Fowler-Nicolosi (Jordan Noyes kick). Rams 31–24. Drive: 3 plays, 25 yards.
- ORST – Gevani McCoy 19-yard run (Everett Hayes kick). Tied 31–31. Drive: 1 play, 19 yards.

Second overtime

- ORST – Anthony Hankerson 25-yard run (Gevani McCoy pass to Jermaine Terry II). Beavers 38–31. Drive: 8 plays, 14 yards.

Statistics	CSU	OSU
First downs	22	26
Total yards	439	398
Rushing yards	176	251
Passing yards	263	147
Turnovers	1	2
Time of possession	28:40	31:20

Team	Category	Player	Statistics
Colorado State	Passing	Brayden Fowler-Nicolosi	20/30, 263 yards, 2 TD
Colorado State	Rushing	Avery Morrow	25 rushes, 140 yards, TD
Colorado State	Receiving	Tory Horton	9 receptions, 158 yards, TD
Oregon State	Passing	Gevani McCoy	16/28, 147 yards, INT
Oregon State	Rushing	Anthony Hankerson	26 rushes, 113 yards, 2 TD
Oregon State	Receiving	Trent Walker	7 receptions, 55 yards

=== San Jose State ===
San Jose State Spartans at Colorado State Rams – Game summary

Quarter	1	2	3	4	Total
Spartans	7	7	0	10	24
Rams	7	7	7	10	31

at Canvas Stadium, Fort Collins, Colorado

- Date: October 12
- Game time: 1:30 p.m. MDT
- Game weather: Sunny, 77 °F (25 °C)
- Game attendance: 27,280
- Referee: Nolan Dumas
- TV announcers (TruTV): Ari Wolfe (play-by-play) and Darius Walker (analyst)

Game information
First quarter
- CSU – Avery Morrow 2-yard run (Jordan Noyes kick), 9:56. Rams 7–0. Drive: 9 plays, 75 yards, 5:04.
- SJSU – Nick Nash 27-yard pass from Emmett Brown (Kyler Halvorsen kick), 5:28. Tied 7–7. Drive: 9 plays, 77 yards, 4:22.

Second quarter

- CSU – Brayden Fowler-Nicolosi 23-yard run (Jordan Noyes kick), 14:16. Rams 14–7. Drive: 3 plays, 44 yards, 0:39.
- SJSU – D. J. Harvey 85-yard fumble return (Kyler Halvorsen kick), 0:56. Tied 14–14.

Third quarter

- CSU – Avery Morrow 2-yard run (Jordan Noyes kick), 1:48. Rams 21–14. Drive: 9 plays, 91 yards, 4:54.

Fourth quarter

- CSU – Jordan Noyes 58-yard field goal, 8:35. Rams 24–14. Drive: 11 plays, 35 yards, 4:21.
- SJSU – Floyd Chalk IV 21-yard run (Kyler Halvorsen kick), 5:07. Rams 24–21. Drive: 10 plays, 75 yards, 3:28.
- CSU – Armani Winfield 62-yard pass from Brayden Fowler-Nicolosi (Jordan Noyes kick), 2:44. Rams 31–21. Drive: 4 plays, 75 yards, 2:23.
- SJSU – Kyler Halvorsen 31-yard field goal, 1:06. Rams 31–24. Drive: 6 plays, 54 yards, 0:55.

Statistics	SJSU	CSU
First downs	21	24
Total yards	448	455
Rushing yards	101	186
Passing yards	347	269
Turnovers	1	2
Time of possession	28:31	31:29

Team	Category	Player	Statistics
San Jose State	Passing	Walker Eget	22/30, 256 yards, INT
San Jose State	Rushing	Floyd Chalk IV	10 rushes, 61 yards, TD
San Jose State	Receiving	Nick Nash	7 receptions, 94 yards, TD
Colorado State	Passing	Brayden Fowler-Nicolosi	22/30, 269 yards, TD, INT
Colorado State	Rushing	Avery Morrow	22 rushes, 100 yards, 2 TD
Colorado State	Receiving	Armani Winfield	6 receptions, 108 yards, TD

=== at Air Force ===
Colorado State Rams at Air Force Falcons – Game summary

Quarter	1	2	3	4	Total
Rams	0	14	7	0	21
Falcons	0	0	0	13	13

at Falcon Stadium, Colorado Springs, Colorado

- Date: October 19
- Game time: 6:00 p.m. MDT
- Game weather: Sunny
- Game attendance: 27,598
- Referee: Kenneth Ray
- TV announcers (CBSSN): Chris Lewis (play-by-play) and Robert Turbin (analyst)

Game information
First quarter
- No scoring plays

Second quarter

- CSU – Vince Brown II 23-yard pass from Kobe Johnson (Jordan Noyes kick), 5:28. Rams 7–0. Drive: 3 plays, 41 yards, 1:30.
- CSU – Jalen Dupree 1-yard run (Jordan Noyes kick), 2:47. Rams 14–0. Drive: 5 plays, 28 yards, 2:28.

Third quarter

- CSU – Caleb Goodie 85-yard pass from Brayden Fowler-Nicolosi (Jordan Noyes kick), 11:02. Rams 21–0. Drive: 3 plays, 90 yards, 0:53.

Fourth quarter

- AF – Tylor Latham 33-yard pass from John Busha (Matthew Dapore kick), 11:49. Rams 21–7. Drive: 4 plays, 73 yards, 1:28.
- AF – John Busha 1-yard run (run failed), 5:50. Rams 21–13. Drive: 10 plays, 75 yards, 3:48.

Statistics	CSU	AFA
First downs	15	19
Total yards	406	348
Rushing yards	205	173
Passing yards	201	175
Turnovers	2	3
Time of possession	28:44	31:16

Team	Category	Player	Statistics
Colorado State	Passing	Brayden Fowler-Nicolosi	11/21, 178 yards, TD
Colorado State	Rushing	Avery Morrow	20 rushes, 132 yards
Colorado State	Receiving	Caleb Goodie	3 receptions, 103 yards, TD
Air Force	Passing	John Busha	10/25, 175 yards, TD, 2 INT
Air Force	Rushing	Dylan Carson	12 rushes, 60 yards
Air Force	Receiving	Tylor Latham	3 receptions, 51 yards, TD

=== New Mexico ===
New Mexico Lobos at Colorado State Rams – Game summary

Quarter	1	2	3	4	Total
Lobos	0	3	3	0	6
Rams	0	17	0	0	17

at Canvas Stadium, Fort Collins, Colorado

- Date: October 26
- Game time: 3:00 p.m. MDT
- Game weather: Sunny, 69 °F (21 °C)
- Game attendance: 36,980
- Referee: Michael Cuttone
- TV announcers (MW Network): Brian Roth (play-by-play) and Mike Sanford Jr. (analyst)

Game information
First quarter
- No scoring plays

Second quarter

- UNM – Luke Drzewiecki 29-yard field goal, 14:13. Lobos 3–0. Drive: 10 plays, 76 yards, 4:15.
- CSU – Caleb Goodie 46-yard pass from Brayden Fowler-Nicolosi (Jordan Noyes kick), 12:41. Rams 7–3. Drive: 4 plays, 79 yards, 1:26.
- CSU – Kobe Johnson 82-yard punt return (Jordan Noyes kick), 9:11. Rams 14–3.
- CSU – Jordan Noyes 47-yard field goal, 0:25. Rams 17–3. Drive: 9 plays, 51 yards, 4:12.

Third quarter

- UNM – Luke Drzewiecki 44-yard field goal, 6:22. Rams 17–6. Drive: 8 plays, 15 yards, 3:37.

Fourth quarter

- No scoring plays

Statistics	UNM	CSU
First downs	25	14
Total yards	453	334
Rushing yards	134	192
Passing yards	319	142
Turnovers	4	0
Time of possession	29:35	30:25

Team	Category	Player	Statistics
New Mexico	Passing	Devon Dampier	23/40, 319 yards, 2 INT
New Mexico	Rushing	Eli Sanders	15 rushes, 70 yards
New Mexico	Receiving	Ryan Davis	9 receptions, 146 yards
Colorado State	Passing	Brayden Fowler-Nicolosi	11/20, 142 yards, TD
Colorado State	Rushing	Avery Morrow	16 rushes, 89 yards
Colorado State	Receiving	Caleb Goodie	3 receptions, 62 yards, TD

=== at Nevada ===
Colorado State Rams at Nevada Wolf Pack – Game summary

Quarter	1	2	3	4	Total
Rams	14	3	11	10	38
Wolf Pack	0	0	7	14	21

at Mackay Stadium, Reno, Nevada

- Date: November 2
- Game time: 5:00 p.m. MDT/4:00 p.m. PDT
- Game weather: Cloudy, 50 °F (10 °C)
- Game attendance: 16,019
- Referee: Patrick Foy
- TV announcers (CBSSN): Chris Lewis (play-by-play) and Robert Turbin (analyst)

Game information
First quarter
- CSU – Avery Morrow 7-yard run (Jordan Noyes kick), 10:40. Rams 7–0. Drive: 7 plays, 67 yards, 4:14.
- CSU – Justin Marshall 8-yard run (Jordan Noyes kick), 2:20. Rams 14–0. Drive: 7 plays, 80 yards, 4:27.

Second quarter

- CSU – Jordan Noyes 60-yard field goal, 5:27. Rams 17–0. Drive: 4 plays, -2 yards, 1:40.

Third quarter

- CSU – Jordan Noyes 21-yard field goal, 11:30. Rams 20–0. Drive: 8 plays, 28 yards, 3:16.
- CSU – Jace Bellah 0-yard fumble return (Brayden Fowler-Nicolosi pass to Jamari Person), 11:17. Rams 28–0.
- NEV – Brendon Lewis 3-yard run (Kian Afrookhteh kick), 7:53. Rams 28–7. Drive: 6 plays, 75 yards, 3:34.

Fourth quarter

- NEV – Brendon Lewis 3-yard run (Kian Afrookhteh kick), 12:16. Rams 28–14. Drive: 12 plays, 95 yards, 6:07.
- CSU – Avery Morrow 15-yard run (Jordan Noyes kick), 8:42. Rams 35–14. Drive: 6 plays, 59 yards, 3:34.
- NEV – Jaden Smith 13-yard pass from Brendon Lewis (Kian Afrookhteh kick), 4:22. Rams 35–21. Drive: 15 plays, 77 yards, 4:15.
- CSU – Jordan Noyes 35-yard field goal, 1:11. Rams 38–21. Drive: 8 plays, 26 yards, 3:11.

Statistics	CSU	NEV
First downs	15	22
Total yards	327	441
Rushing yards	170	189
Passing yards	157	252
Turnovers	0	2
Time of possession	28:58	28:53

Team	Category	Player	Statistics
Colorado State	Passing	Brayden Fowler-Nicolosi	9/15, 157 yards
Colorado State	Rushing	Avery Morrow	18 rushes, 77 yards, 2 TD
Colorado State	Receiving	Caleb Goodie	2 receptions, 66 yards
Nevada	Passing	Brendon Lewis	20/28, 252 yards, TD
Nevada	Rushing	Brendon Lewis	14 rushes, 109 yards, 2 TD
Nevada	Receiving	Cortez Braham Jr.	9 receptions, 141 yards

=== Wyoming ===
Wyoming Cowboys at Colorado State Rams – Game summary

Quarter	1	2	3	4	Total
Cowboys	0	3	7	0	10
Rams	14	3	7	0	24

at Canvas Stadium, Fort Collins, Colorado

- Date: November 15
- Game time: 6:00 p.m. MST
- Game weather: Clear, 41 °F (5 °C)
- Game attendance: 36,720
- Referee: Patrick Foy
- TV announcers (CBSSN): Chris Lewis (play-by-play) and Donte Whitner (analyst)

Game information

First quarter

- (11:39) CSU – Avery Morrow 11-yard run, Jordan Noyes kick (Drive: 6 plays, 75 yards, 3:21; CSU 7–0)
- (0:28) CSU – Brayden Fowler-Nicolosi 6-yard pass from Dane Olson, Jordan Noyes kick (Drive: 5 plays, 83 yards, 2:43; CSU 14–0)

Second quarter

- (12:15) WYO – John Hoyland 49-yard field goal (Drive: 6 plays, 35 yards, 3:08; CSU 14–3)
- (5:36) CSU – Jordan Noyes 22-yard field goal ('Drive: 11 plays, 78 yards, 6:32; CSU 17–3)

Third quarter

- (11:45) CSU – Tommy Maher 53-yard pass from Brayden Fowler-Nicolosi ('Drive: 2 plays, 85 yards, 0:40; CSU 24–3)
- (8:42) WYO – Kaden Anderson 1-yard run, John Hoyland kick ('Drive: 6 plays, 66 yards, 2:56; CSU 24–10)

Fourth quarter

No scoring plays

Statistics	WYO	CSU
First downs	10	17
Total yards	237	446
Rushing yards	117	248
Passing yards	120	198
Turnovers	0	1
Time of possession	25:10	34:50

Team	Category	Player	Statistics
Wyoming	Passing	Kaden Anderson	13/30, 120 yards
Wyoming	Rushing	Jamari Ferrell	6 rushes, 74 yards
Wyoming	Receiving	Jaylen Sargent	3 receptions, 45 yards
Colorado State	Passing	Brayden Fowler-Nicolosi	14/17, 192 yards, TD
Colorado State	Rushing	Justin Marshall	16 rushes, 104 yards
Colorado State	Receiving	Tommy Maher	1 reception, 53 yards, TD

=== at Fresno State ===
Colorado State Rams at Fresno State Bulldogs – Game summary

Quarter	1	2	3	4	Total
Rams	7	0	7	8	22
Bulldogs	7	21	0	0	28

at Valley Children's Stadium, Fresno, California

- Date: November 23
- Game time: 8:30 p.m. MST/7:30 p.m. PST
- Game weather: Sunny, 55 °F (13 °C)
- Game attendance: 39,543
- Referee: Kenneth Ray
- TV announcers (CBSSN): Carter Blackburn (play-by-play) and Randy Cross (analyst)

Game information

First quarter

- (8:28) CSU – Justin Marshall 10-yard run, Jordan Noyes kick (Drive: 12 plays, 77 yards, 6:26; Colorado State 7–0)
- (7:06) FRES – Bryson Donelson 16-yard run, Dylan Lynch kick (Drive: 4 plays, 80 yards, 1:18; Tied 7–7)

Second quarter

- (10:54) FRES – Joshua Wood 4-yard run, Dylan Lynch kick (Drive: 5 plays, 58 yards, 2:22; Fresno State 14–7)
- (3:18) FRES – Mac Dalena 28-yard pass from Mikey Keene, Dylan Lynch kick (Drive: 6 plays, 54 yards, 2:18; Fresno State 21–7)
- (0:23) FRES – Jalen Moss 15-yard pass from Mikey Keene, Dylan Lynch kick (Drive: 10 plays, 58 yards, 1:44; Fresno State 28–7)

Third quarter

- (3:25) CSU – Brayden Fowler-Nicolosi 9-yard run, Jordan Noyes kick (Drive: 6 plays, 35 yards, 2:15; Fresno State 28–14)

Fourth quarter

- (0:17) CSU – Jamari Person 5-yard pass from Brayden Fowler-Nicolosi, Vince Brown II–Brayden Fowler-Nicolosi two-point pass (Drive: 7 plays, 90 yards, 1:28; Fresno State 28–22)

Statistics	CSU	FRES
First downs	23	19
Total yards	422	343
Rushing yards	120	162
Passing yards	302	181
Turnovers	1	1
Time of possession	34:17	25:43

Team	Category	Player	Statistics
Colorado State	Passing	Brayden Fowler-Nicolosi	23/45, 283 yards, TD
Colorado State	Rushing	Justin Marshall	20 rushes, 94 yards, TD
Colorado State	Receiving	Jamari Person	9 receptions, 112 yards, TD
Fresno State	Passing	Mikey Keene	20/28, 181 yards, 2 TD
Fresno State	Rushing	Bryson Donelson	13 rushes, 150 yards, TD
Fresno State	Receiving	Mac Dalena	7 receptions, 75 yards, TD

=== Utah State ===
Utah State Aggies at Colorado State Rams – Game summary

Quarter	1	2	3	4	Total
Aggies	13	3	14	7	37
Rams	0	13	0	29	42

at Canvas Stadium, Fort Collins, Colorado

- Date: November 29
- Game time: 1:30 p.m. MST
- Game weather: Sunny, 42 °F (6 °C)
- Game attendance: 24,772
- Referee: Christian Watson
- TV announcers (FS1): Chris Vosters (play-by-play) and Sherdrick Bonner (analyst)

Game information
First quarter
- USU – Bryson Barnes 1-yard run (pass failed), 6:17. Aggies 6–0. Drive: 6 plays, 76 yards, 2:02.
- USU – Otto Tia 2-yard pass from Bryson Barnes (Tanner Cragun kick), 2:09. Aggies 13–0. Drive: 5 plays, 43 yards, 2:13.

Second quarter

- CSU – Jordan Noyes 33-yard field goal, 10:28. Aggies 13–3. Drive: 14 plays, 60 yards, 6:41.
- USU – Tanner Cragun 26-yard field goal, 7:55. Aggies 16–3. Drive: 7 plays, 66 yards, 2:33.
- CSU – Jordan Noyes 40-yard field goal, 1:44. Aggies 16–6. Drive: 13 plays, 56 yards, 6:06.
- CSU – Dane Olsen 28-yard pass from Brayden Fowler-Nicolosi (Jordan Noyes kick), 0:19. Aggies 16–13. Drive: 7 plays, 54 yards, 0:46.

Third quarter

- USU – Otto Tia 14-yard pass from Bryson Barnes (Tanner Cragun kick), 1:07. Aggies 23–13. Drive: 15 plays, 79 yards, 5:59.
- USU – Jaiden Francois 40-yard interception return (Tanner Cragun kick), 0:49. Aggies 30–13.

Fourth quarter

- CSU – Vince Brown II 12-yard pass from Brayden Fowler-Nicolosi (Brayden Fowler-Nicolosi pass to Jamari Person), 13:30. Aggies 30–21. Drive: 6 plays, 75 yards, 2:19.
- CSU – Jordan Ross 22-yard pass from Brayden Fowler-Nicolosi (Jordan Noyes kick), 6:03. Aggies 30–28. Drive: 7 plays, 74 yards, 1:56.
- CSU – Brayden Fowler-Nicolosi 3-yard run (Jordan Noyes kick), 2:32. Rams 35–30. Drive: 3 plays, 19 yards, 1:25.
- CSU – Vince Brown II 26-yard pass from Brayden Fowler-Nicolosi (Jordan Noyes kick), 1:37. Rams 42–30. Drive: 4 plays, 34 yards, 0:19.
- USU – Otto Tia 2-yard pass from Bryson Barnes (Tanner Cragun kick), 0:14. Rams 42–37. Drive: 9 plays, 75 yards, 1:23.

Statistics	USU	CSU
First downs	24	22
Total yards	485	454
Rushing yards	296	84
Passing yards	189	370
Turnovers	3	1
Time of possession	28:17	31:43

Team	Category	Player	Statistics
Utah State	Passing	Bryson Barnes	17/29, 189 yards, 3 TD, INT
Utah State	Rushing	Bryson Barnes	24 rushes, 185 yards, TD
Utah State	Receiving	Otto Tia	6 receptions, 81 yards, 3 TD
Colorado State	Passing	Brayden Fowler-Nicolosi	31/46, 370 yards, 4 TD, INT
Colorado State	Rushing	Avery Morrow	21 rushes, 80 yards
Colorado State	Receiving	Dane Olson	5 receptions, 140 yards, TD

=== Miami (OH) (Arizona Bowl) ===
2024 Arizona Bowl
Miami RedHawks vs. Colorado State Rams – Game summary

Quarter	1	2	3	4	Total
RedHawks	6	3	20	14	43
Rams	3	0	7	7	17

at Arizona Stadium, Tucson, Arizona

- Date: December 28
- Game time: 2:30 p.m. MST
- Game weather: Sunny, 70 °F (21 °C)
- Game attendance: 40,076
- Referee: Steven Anderson
- TV announcers (The CW): Thom Brennaman, Max Browne, and Treavor Scales
- Box score, Recap

Game information
First quarter
- CSU – Jordan Noyes 21-yard field goal, 8:15. Rams 3–0. Drive: 13 plays, 72 yards, 6:45.
- M-OH – Dom Dzioban 34-yard field goal, 3:35. Tied 3–3. Drive: 5 plays, 18 yards, 1:39.
- M-OH – Dom Dzioban 26-yard field goal, 0:08. RedHawks 6–3. Drive: 4 plays, 3 yards, 0:53.

Second quarter

- M-OH – Dom Dzioban 24-yard field goal, 0:12. RedHawks 9–3. Drive: 9 plays, 55 yards, 2:20.

Third quarter

- M-OH – Kevin Davis 4-yard run (Dom Dzioban kick), 12:35. RedHawks 16–3. Drive: 6 plays, 75 yards, 2:25.
- M-OH – Brett Gabbert 10-yard run (pass failed), 10:26. RedHawks 22–3. Drive: 5 plays, 47 yards, 1:57.
- M-OH – Kevin Davis 97-yard run (Dom Dzioban kick), 6:46. RedHawks 29–3. Drive: 1 play, 97 yards, 0:14.
- CSU – Stephon Daily 56-yard pass from Brayden Fowler-Nicolosi (Jordan Noyes kick), 3:13. RedHawks 29–10. Drive: 7 plays, 75 yards, 3:33.

Fourth quarter

- M-OH – Jordan Brunson 2-yard run (Dom Dzioban kick), 13:30. RedHawks 36–10. Drive: 3 plays, 5 yards, 1:30.
- CSU – Peter Montini 1-yard run (Jordan Noyes kick), 9:02. RedHawks 36–17. Drive: 5 plays, 22 yards, 2:12.
- M-OH – Jordan Brunson 12-yard run (Dom Dzioban kick), 2:16. RedHawks 43–17. Drive: 10 plays, 40 yards, 6:46.

Statistics	M-OH	CSU
First downs	18	19
Total yards	401	462
Rushing yards	217	141
Passing yards	184	321
Turnovers	2	4
Time of possession	27:16	32:44

Team	Category	Player	Statistics
Miami (OH)	Passing	Brett Gabbert	13/25, 184 yards
Miami (OH)	Rushing	Kevin Davis	9 rushes, 148 yards, 2 TD
Miami (OH)	Receiving	Kam Perry	2 receptions, 57 yards
Colorado State	Passing	Brayden Fowler-Nicolosi	23/45, 321 yards, TD, 2 INT
Colorado State	Rushing	Justin Marshall	9 rushes, 84 yards
Colorado State	Receiving	Stephon Daily	4 receptions, 74 yards, TD
