= 2024 Arizona Bowl =

Postseason college football bowl game

2024 Snoop Dogg Arizona Bowl presented by Gin & Juice
- 9th Arizona Bowl
Miami RedHawks	Colorado State Rams
(8–5)	(8–4)
MAC	MW
43	17
Head coach: Chuck Martin	Head coach: Jay Norvell
	1	2	3	4	Total
Miami	6	3	20	14	43
Colorado State	3	0	7	7	17
- Date: December 28, 2024
- Season: 2024
- Stadium: Arizona Stadium
- Location: Tucson, Arizona
- MVP: Kevin Davis (RB, Miami)
- Favorite: Miami by 1.5
- Referee: Steven Anderson (AAC)
- Attendance: 40,076

United States TV coverage
- Network: The CW
- Announcers: Thom Brennaman (play-by-play), Max Browne (analyst), and Treavor Scales (sideline)

The 2024 Arizona Bowl was a college football bowl game played on December 28, 2024, at Arizona Stadium in Tucson, Arizona. The ninth annual Arizona Bowl featured Colorado State and Miami University. The game began at approximately 2:30 p.m. MST and aired on The CW. The Arizona Bowl was one of the 2024–25 bowl games concluding the 2024 FBS football season. On May 6, 2024, Snoop Dogg's drink brand, Gin & Juice by Dre and Snoop, became the new Arizona Bowl title sponsor, with the bowl officially named the Snoop Dogg Arizona Bowl presented by Gin & Juice by Dre and Snoop. Miami defeated Colorado State, 43–17, to claim their first bowl victory since 2021.

== Teams ==
Consistent with conference tie-ins, the game featured Miami of the Mid-American Conference (MAC) and Colorado State of the Mountain West Conference (MW).

=== Miami RedHawks ===
Miami finished their regular season with an 8–4 record (7–1 in conference). The RedHawks lost four of their first five games, then won seven in a row. They met Ohio in the MAC Championship Game, but took a 38–3 loss. Miami faced one ranked team during the season, losing to Notre Dame. The RedHawks entered the bowl with an 8–5 record.

=== Colorado State Rams ===
Colorado State posted an 8–4 record in regular-season play (6–1 in conference). The Rams began the season with three losses in five games, then finished with six wins in their final seven games. Colorado State played, and lost to, one ranked team, Texas.

== Game summary ==
2024 Arizona Bowl

Quarter	1	2	3	4	Total
Miami (OH)	6	3	20	14	43
Colorado State	3	0	7	7	17

at Arizona Stadium • Tucson, Arizona

- Date: Saturday, December 28, 2024
- Game time: 2:38 p.m. MST
- Game weather: Sunny • Temperature: 70 °F (21 °C)
- Game attendance: 40,076
- Referee: Steven Anderson
- TV announcers (The CW): Thom Brennaman (play-by-play), Max Browne (analyst), and Treavor Scales (sideline)
- Box score

Game information

First quarter

- (8:15) CSU – Jordan Noyes 21-yard field goal (Drive: 13 plays, 72 yards, 6:45; Colorado State 3–0)
- (3:35) M-OH – Dom Dzioban 34-yard field goal (Drive: 5 plays, 18 yards, 1:39; Tied 3–3)
- (0:08) M-OH – Dom Dzioban 26-yard field goal (Drive: 4 plays, 3 yards, 0:53; Miami (OH) 6–3)

Second quarter

- (0:12) M-OH – Dom Dzioban 24-yard field goal (Drive: 9 plays, 55 yards, 2:20; Miami (OH) 9–3)

Third quarter

- (12:35) M-OH – Kevin Davis 4-yard run, Dom Dzioban kick (Drive: 6 plays, 75 yards, 2:25; Miami (OH) 16–3)
- (10:26) M-OH – Brett Gabbert 10-yard run, 2-point pass conversion failed (Drive: 5 plays, 47 yards, 1:57; Miami (OH) 22–3)
- (6:46) M-OH – Kevin Davis 97-yard run, Dom Dzioban kick (Drive: 1 play, 97 yards, 0:14; Miami (OH) 29–3)
- (3:13) CSU – Stephon Daily 56-yard pass from Brayden Fowler-Nicolosi, Jordan Noyes kick (Drive: 7 plays, 75 yards, 3:33; CSU 29–10)

Fourth quarter

- (13:30) M-OH – Jordan Brunson 2-yard run, Dom Dzioban kick (Drive: 3 play, 5 yards, 1:30; Miami (OH) 36–10)
- (9:02) CSU – Peter Montini 1-yard run, Jordan Noyes kick (Drive: 5 plays, 22 yards, 2:12; Miami (OH) 36–17)
- (2:16) M-OH – Jordan Brunson 12-yard run, Dom Dzioban kick (Drive: 10 plays, 40 yards, 6:46; Miami (OH) 43–17)

=== Statistics ===
Statistics	MIA	CSU
First downs	18	19
Plays–yards	59–401	75–462
Rushes–yards	34–217	30–141
Passing yards	184	321
Passing: comp–att–int	13–25–0	23–45–2
Time of possession	27:16	32:44

Team	Category	Player	Statistics
Miami (OH)	Passing	Brett Gabbert	13/25, 184 yards
Miami (OH)	Rushing	Kevin Davis	9 carries, 148 yards, 2 TD
Miami (OH)	Receiving	Kam Perry	2 receptions, 57 yards
Colorado State	Passing	Brayden Fowler-Nicolosi	23/45, 321 yards, TD, 2 INT
Colorado State	Rushing	Justin Marshall	9 carries, 84 yards
Colorado State	Receiving	Stephon Daily	4 receptions, 74 yards, TD
