= Bojay Filimoeatu =

American football player and coach (born 1989)

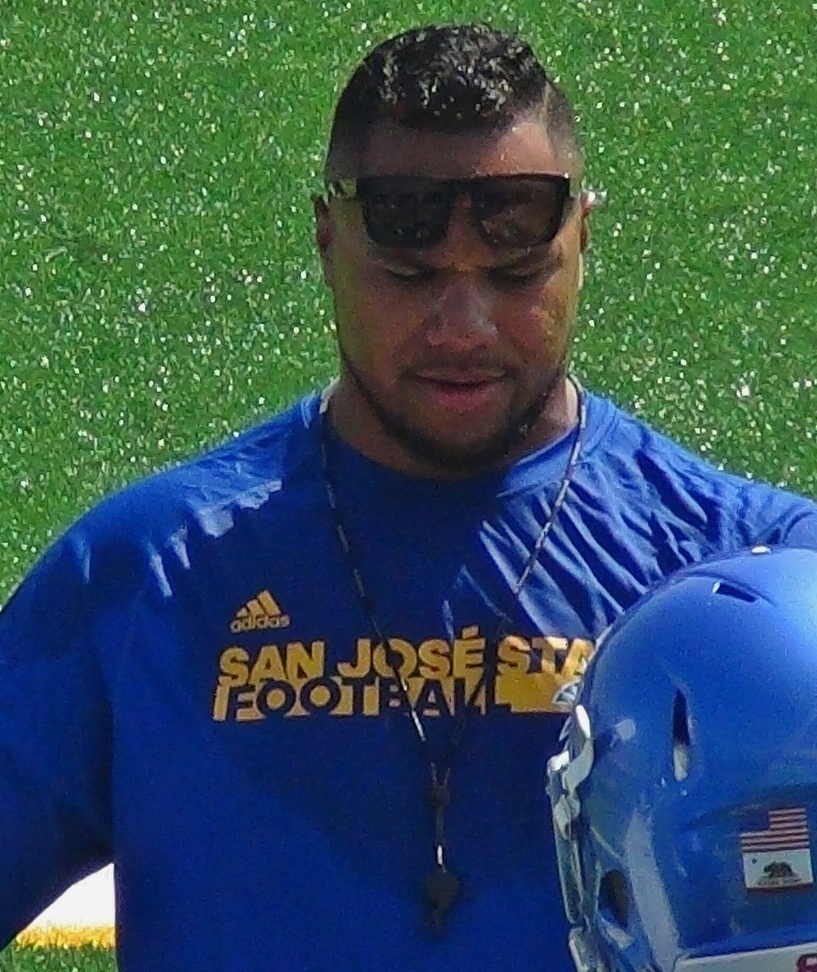
- Filimoeatu in 2017

Current position
- Title: Defensive coordinator
- Team: San Jose State
- Conference: Mountain West

Biographical details
- Born: December 6, 1989 (age 36); Fontana, California, U.S.
- Height: 6 ft 2 in (188 cm)
- Weight: 250 lb (110 kg; 17 st 12 lb)
- Education: Utah State University

Playing career
- 2009–2010: Mt. San Antonio
- 2011–2012: Utah State
- 2014–2015: Oakland Raiders
- Position: Linebacker

Coaching career (HC unless noted)
- 2016: Oregon State (ILB/QC)
- 2017–2018: San Jose State (LB)
- 2019: Utah State (DB)
- 2020: Utah State (OLB)
- 2021: Weber State (DL)
- 2022–2023: UNLV (DL)
- 2024–2025: San Jose State (ILB/RGC)
- 2025: San Jose State (Interim DC)
- 2026–present: San Jose State (DC)

Accomplishments and honors

Awards
- CCCAA champion (2010); CCCAA Defensive MVP (2010)

Bojay Bruce Feleunga Filimoeatu (born December 6, 1989) is an American football coach and former linebacker from the United States, who has been the Defensive coordinator at San Jose State since 2026. He played college football at Utah State and played in the NFL briefly for the Oakland Raiders from 2014 to 2015, before becoming a college football coach.

== Early life ==
Born in Fontana, California, and raised in West Valley City, Utah, Filimoeatu graduated from Granger High School in West Valley City in 2008. He played at linebacker and fullback at Granger.

== College career ==
Returning to his native California, Filimoeatu began his college football career on the junior college level at Mt. San Antonio College (Mt. SAC) in Walnut near Los Angeles. Helping Mt. SAC win its second straight state title, Filimoeatu was the 2010 CCCAA Defensive MVP. On January 30, 2011, Filimoeatu signed his letter of intent with Utah State, one of four Division I FBS schools to offer him scholarships.

College recruiting
| Name | Hometown | School | Height | Weight | Commit date |
|---|---|---|---|---|---|
| Bojay Filimoeatu; WDE | West Valley City, UT | Mt. San Antonio | 6 ft 2 in (1.88 m) | 250 lb (110 kg) | Jan 30, 2011 |
| Bojay Filimoeatu; WDE | Recruit ratings: Rivals: 247Sports: | | | | |
Overall recruit ranking: Scout: 31 (JUCO), 1 (position) Rivals: 36 (JUCO)
Note: In many cases, Scout, Rivals, 247Sports, On3, and ESPN may conflict in their listings of height and weight.; In these cases, the average was taken. ESPN grades are on a 100-point scale.; Sources: "Bojay Filimoeatu". Rivals. Archived from the original on August 19, 2018.; "2011 Team Ranking". Rivals.com.; "Utah State 2011 Football Commits". 247Sports.

He started all 26 games in the 2011 and 2012 seasons at Utah State and registered 112 tackles (48 solo), eight sacks, one interception, two passes defended, two forced fumbles and one fumble recovery. During his senior season, he posted 71 tackles and five sacks.

== Professional career ==
Due to a knee injury during the Casino Del Sol College All Star Game in January 2013, Filimoeatu put his football career on hold and only tried out before NFL scouts at Utah State pro day prior to the 2014 NFL draft. Filimoeatu originally signed with the Oakland Raiders as an undrafted free agent on May 19, 2014 and was waived by the team at the end of training camp before signing to the practice squad two days later. On September 13, 2014, Filimoeatu was promoted to the active roster after a season-ending injury to Taiwan Jones. Filimoeatu made his NFL debut on September 14 against the Houston Texans. For the 2014 season, Filimoeatu played in eight games and made six tackles. Filimoeatu did not see any game action in 2015.

== Coaching career ==
Filimoeatu began his coaching career in 2016 at Oregon State as inside linebackers and defensive quality control coach under Brent Brennan. When Brennan became head coach at San Jose State, Filimoeatu followed him there in 2017 as linebackers coach. On December 19, 2018, returning head coach Gary Andersen hired him to be the defensive ends coach on his new staff.

Filimoeatu rejoined San Jose State in 2024 as their inside linebackers coach and run game coordinator. In November 2025, he was named interim defensive coordinator for the final two games after Derrick Odum's firing. Filimoeatu became the permanent defensive coordinator on January 29, 2026.
