= John Estes =

American gridiron football player and coach (born 1987)

St. Louis Battlehawks
- Title: Running backs coach

Personal information
- Born: March 25, 1987 (age 39); Stockton, California, U.S.
- Listed height: 6 ft 2 in (1.88 m)
- Listed weight: 293 lb (133 kg)

Career information
- Position: Center (No. 62)
- High school: St. Mary's (Stockton)
- College: Hawaii
- NFL draft: 2010: undrafted

Career history

Playing
- Jacksonville Jaguars (2010–2012); Arizona Cardinals (2014)*; Calgary Stampeders (2015)*
- * Offseason or practice squad member only

Coaching
- Hawaii (2016–2017) Graduate assistant; Houston Roughnecks (2020) Offensive line coach; TSL Conquerors (2021) Offensive line coach; TSL Alphas (2022) Offensive line coach; Houston Roughnecks (2023) Running backs coach; San Jose State (2024–2025) Offensive line coach; St. Louis Battlehawks (2026–present) Running backs coach

Awards and highlights
- 3× First-team All-WAC (2007–2009)

Career NFL statistics
- Games played: 2
- Stats at Pro Football Reference

John Estes (born March 25, 1987) is an American former professional football player who was a center and guard for the Jacksonville Jaguars of the National Football League (NFL). He played college football for the Hawaii Rainbow Warriors. He is currently the running backs coach for the St. Louis Battlehawks of the United Football League (UFL).

== College career ==
At the University of Hawaiʻi at Mānoa, Estes was a three-time All-Western Athletic Conference (WAC) performer. Estes also set the NCAA record for consecutive games started (54) and games played (54) in 2009.

Estes was on the Rimington Award watch list in 2007, 2008, and 2009. In his senior year campaign of 2009 he was one of 3 finalists for the award. He graduated from the University of Hawaii at Manoa with a degree in Communications in December 2009.

In 2019, he was named to the WAC's All-Decade Team for the 2000s.

== Professional career ==
Estes was signed as an undrafted free agent following the 2010 NFL draft by the Jacksonville Jaguars. Estes spent the 2012 season on injured reserve. He became a free agent in March 2013.

He signed with the Arizona Cardinals on March 4, 2014. He was released by the team on May 12. He re-signed with the Cardinals on June 9 and was released on August 30, 2014.

Estes signed with the Calgary Stampeders as a free agent on July 21, 2015.

== Coaching career ==
Estes was a graduate assistant at Hawaii on Nick Rolovich's inaugural staff in 2016. He remained on the staff for the 2017 season, serving as the team's de facto offensive line coach after Chris Naeole resigned midway through the season.

In 2019, Estes joined the Houston Roughnecks of the XFL as offensive line coach.

Estes joined San Jose State in 2024 as their offensive line coach. He was relieved of his duties on December 1, 2025.

== Football relatives ==
Estes comes from a long line of football players in his family both collegiately and professionally:

- His grandfather Pat Hiram and uncle Roy Hiram were All-American running backs at San Jose State University
- His brother Patrick Estes was a defensive tackle at the University of Nevada in 2002
- His uncle was All-Pro offensive tackle Rocky Freitas of the Detroit Lions
- His cousins Makai Freitas was on the Arizona Wildcats in 2001, Makoa Freitas was on the Arizona Wildcats 2003 and the Indianapolis Colts, Kahai 2008 and Kainoa LaCount 2010 at the University of Hawaii, and Mana Greig University of Oregon 2014.
