= Walker Eget =

American football player (born 2003)

No. 2 – Duke Blue Devils
- Position: Quarterback
- Class: (redshirt) Senior

Personal information
- Born: July 5, 2003 (age 23)
- Listed height: 6 ft 3 in (1.91 m)
- Listed weight: 235 lb (107 kg)

Career information
- High school: West Ranch (Stevenson Ranch, California)
- College: San Jose State (2021–2025); Duke (2026–present)
- Stats at ESPN

Walker Eget (born July 5, 2003) is an American college football quarterback for the Duke Blue Devils. He previously played for the San Jose State Spartans.

== Early life ==
Eget attended West Ranch High School in Stevenson Ranch, California. He was rated as a three-star recruit and committed to play college football for the San Jose State Spartans.

== College career ==
In his first three seasons from 2021 to 2023, Eget appeared in four games where he completed one of his nine pass attempts for eight yards, while also redshirting. In week 8 of the 2024 season, he got his first career start where he completed 20 of his 38 passes for 318 yards and a touchdown with two interceptions in a 24–14 win over Wyoming. In week 11, Eget threw for 395 yards and a touchdown in a win over Oregon State.

=== Statistics ===
Season	Team	Games			Passing								Rushing			
Season	Team	GP	GS	Record	Cmp	Att	Pct	Yds	Y/A	TD	Int	Rtg	Att	Yds	Avg	TD
2021	San Jose State	1	0	—	1	8	12.5	8	1.0	0	0	20.9	1	−15	−15.0	0
2022	San Jose State	3	0	—	0	1	0.0	0	0.0	0	0	0.0	1	1	1.0	0
2023	San Jose State	0	0	—	DNP											
2024	San Jose State	12	7	3–4	188	328	57.3	2,504	7.6	13	10	128.4	29	99	3.4	0
2025	San Jose State	11	11	3–8	232	393	59.0	3,047	7.8	17	9	133.9	33	96	2.9	0
2026	Duke	8	8	6–2	133	215	61.9	1,641	7.6	9	3	136.8	9	−14	−1.5	0
Career		34	25	11–14	543	927	58.6	7,003	7.6	38	22	130.8	71	175	2.5	0
