= Chris Lewis (sportscaster) =

American play by play commentator

- Born: February 11, 1991 (age 35); New Jersey, U.S.
- Education: Syracuse University
- Occupation: Sportscaster
- Years active: 2013–present

Christopher Lewis (born February 11, 1991) is an American sportscaster and commentator who has worked for CBS Sports since 2021. He currently works on CBS's college football and basketball productions, as well as being a play by play commentator for CBS's NFL games since 2024. Lewis graduated from Syracuse University, and was best known before his CBS work for being the play by play voice for Boise State.

Beginning in 2023, Lewis began work for CBS as a part-time commentator, often swapping out duties with Beth Mowins, though he began to take a larger role in 2024.

Lewis is a noted Philadelphia sports fan.

== See also ==
- List of NFL on CBS announcers
