= Brayden Fowler-Nicolosi =

American football player (born 2003)

No. 16 – Michigan Wolverines
- Position: Quarterback
- Class: Senior

Personal information
- Born: December 11, 2003 (age 22)
- Listed height: 6 ft 3 in (1.91 m)
- Listed weight: 212 lb (96 kg)

Career information
- High school: Aledo (Aledo, Texas)
- College: Colorado State (2022–2025); Michigan (2026–present)
- Stats at ESPN

Brayden Fowler-Nicolosi (born December 11, 2003) is an American college football quarterback for the Michigan Wolverines. He previously played for the Colorado State Rams.

== Early life ==
Fowler-Nicolosi initially attended Torrey Pines High School in San Diego and transferred to Aledo High School in Aledo, Texas during his junior year, earning the starting quarterback role for the Bearcats within a few weeks. As a senior, he completed 114 of 171 passes for 2,051 yards with 24 touchdowns and an interception. In the state championship game, Fowler-Nicolosi threw for 215 yards and two touchdowns, as he helped his high school win. He was rated a three-star recruit and committed to play college football at Colorado State over offers from Nevada, Arizona, Arkansas State, Middle Tennessee, Oregon State, Pittsburgh and Toledo.

== College career ==
=== Colorado State ===
Fowler-Nicolosi enrolled early at Colorado State to participate in the 2022 spring practices. As a freshman in 2022, he was named as the starting quarterback during the Week 5 game against Nevada due to an injury from starter Clay Millen. Fowler-Nicolosi finished the season having completed 17 of 37 passing attempts for 194 yards and two touchdowns with an interception.

In the 2023 season opener, Fowler-Nicolosi came in relief for starting quarterback Clay Millen and completed 13 of his 20 pass attempts for 208 yards and two touchdowns with an interception in a loss to Washington State. In Week 3, Fowler-Nicolosi was named the starting quarterback for their matchup versus rival Colorado. In Week 4 against Middle Tennessee, he completed 30 of 43 passing attempts for 321 yards and two touchdowns in a 31–23 win. The following week, Fowler-Nicolosi went 26 for 32 for 462 yards and four touchdowns with two interceptions, along with a rushing touchdown, in a win over Utah Tech.

On October 22, 2025, Colorado State Interim Head Coach Tyson Summers announced that Fowler-Nicolosi was no longer with the program.

=== Michigan ===
On January 11, 2026, Fowler-Nicolosi transferred to the University of Michigan.

=== Statistics ===
Season	Team	Games			Passing								Rushing			
Season	Team	GP	GS	Record	Cmp	Att	Pct	Yds	Y/A	TD	Int	Rtg	Att	Yds	Avg	TD
2022	Colorado State	3	1	1−0	17	37	45.9	194	5.2	1	2	88.1	5	6	1.2	0
2023	Colorado State	12	11	5−6	292	470	62.1	3,460	7.4	22	16	132.6	33	-27	-0.8	1
2024	Colorado State	13	13	8−5	230	380	60.5	2,796	7.4	14	9	129.8	43	75	1.7	4
2025	Colorado State	3	3	1−2	44	82	53.7	488	6.0	1	2	102.8	14	-3	-0.2	1
Career		31	28	15−13	583	969	60.2	6,938	7.2	38	29	127.3	95	51	0.5	6
