= Bottoms Up =

Bottoms Up may refer to:

== Music ==
- Bottoms Up (Illinois Jacquet album), 1968
- Bottoms Up (Obie Trice album), 2012
- Bottoms Up!, a 1959 album by jazz group The Three Sounds
- "Bottoms Up" (Brantley Gilbert song), 2013
- "Bottoms Up" (Middle of the Road song), song by Scottish band Middle of the Road, 1972
- "Bottoms Up" (Nickelback song) from Nickelback's album Here and Now
- "Bottoms Up" (Trey Songz song), 2010
- "U Was at the Club (Bottoms Up)", song by The BoyBoy West Coast
- "Bottoms Up", a song by Keke Palmer from her debut album So Uncool
- "Bottoms Up!", track four on Van Halen's album Van Halen II

== Film and television ==
- Bottoms Up (1934 film), a 1934 musical comedy film
- Bottoms Up (1960 film), starring Jimmy Edwards
- Bottoms Up (2006 film), a film starring Paris Hilton
- 'S Up, the fifth episode of the first series of British sitcom Bottom
- Bottoms Up (Entourage), an episode of the TV series Entourage

== Other uses ==
- Bottoms Up Club, a bar in Hong Kong
- "Bottoms Up" Shot Cup, risqué ceramic cup featuring a naked girl draped over the bottom

== See also ==
- Bottom-up (disambiguation)
- Top-down (disambiguation)
