= Hellscape Suburbia =

EP by ElyOtto
- Released: April 8, 2022
- Genre: Hyperpop
- Length: 14:19
- Label: RCA

Hellscape Suburbia is the debut EP by Canadian musician ElyOtto, released on April 8, 2022, through RCA Records. The album was supported by the singles "stalker", "Profane", and "THE COPS". The album's name drew from ElyOtto's dissatisfaction with "cookie cutter suburbs and the hellscape of generic repetition". The album cover features his pet spider, Shelob, which was partially used as a form of expression of his admiration for the "frighteningly fantastical".

== Background and release ==
Following the success of his single "SugarCrash!", with remixes featuring the likes of Kim Petras and Curtis Walters that garnered a combined 450 million streams, ElyOtto was approached by seven record labels looking to sign him. After quickly hiring a music manager and a lawyer, he settled on RCA Records. The deal included the release of multiple EPs and possibly a full-length album. He primarily signed the deal to pay for his future schooling, as well as a car and to help out his family financially, rather than to become a global sensation. He noted how all the attention from SugarCrash! was difficult to handle.

ElyOtto began working on his first, and ultimately last, EP under the label in his home, where all the recording took place. It featured eight tracks and was released on April 8, 2022.

== Music and lyrics ==
ElyOtto took inspiration from 1990s rave movements and wanted to develop a more mature, rough rounded sound for the album. He blended multiple genres in the release, from the sound of Profane, to the sci-fi synth sound of stalker. His "prized lyrical possession" of the album, "DAYZEE", featured lyrics of, as he put it, "a small-town beauty queen's desire to live a famous life, all unpleasant aspects included" and giving a skewed perspective of fame from his point of view.

== Track listing ==
All tracks written and produced by Elliott Ferrous-Martin Platt, except where noted. Credits adapted from TIDAL.

No.	Title	Writer(s)	Length
1.	"stalker"		1:40
2.	"Profane" (extended)		2:28
3.	"DAYZEE"		2:13
4.	"freya"		1:38
5.	"2013"		1:29
6.	"When ur free" (Elliot Platt, Gregory C. Coleman, Phil Tolotta, Quincy Mattison, Ray Maritano, Richard Lewis Spencer, Sonny Pekerol)		1:53
7.	"THE COPS" (featuring Tokyo Ghetto Pussy)	Elliot Platt, Markus Loeffel, Rolf Ellmer	1:42
8.	"don't eat all of the FCKING viva puffs"		1:14
Total length:			14:19
