= Stunnin' =

2020 single by Curtis Waters featuring Harm Franklin

Single by Curtis Waters featuring Harm Franklin

from the album Pity Party
- Released: May 19, 2020
- Genre: Pop rap
- Length: 2:24
- Label: BMG
- Songwriters: Abhinav Bastakoti; Harmenvir Khara; Declan Hoy
- Producers: Waters; Decz

Curtis Waters singles chronology
"Stunnin'" (2020)	"System" (2020)

Harm Franklin singles chronology
"Fresh N Dope Family Van" (2020)	"Stunnin'" (2020)

Music video
- "Stunnin'" on YouTube

"Stunnin'" is a song by Canadian-American musician Curtis Waters, released on May 19, 2020 as his debut single. The song features Canadian musician Harm Franklin and was produced by Decz. The official music video was directed and edited by Ryan Tempke. It went viral on the video-sharing app TikTok, becoming the breakthrough hit of both artists.

== Background ==
While a student at UNC Greensboro and working at Tropical Smoothie Cafe, Curtis Waters studied the promotion methods of viral hits on TikTok, such as that of Lil Nas X's "Old Town Road" and The BoyBoy West Coast's "U Was at the Club (Bottoms Up)". He has explained that he recorded "Stunnin'" because "I was just in a bad mood, trying to make some stupid shit and cheer up."

== Release and promotion ==
In early April 2020, Waters uploaded his first video on TikTok, of him and his brother dancing to the song in front of their garage. He continued to post similar clips featuring the song, propelling it to recognition. The success of the song led to Waters receiving many record deals, including one with BMG Rights Management which he settled for. "Stunnin'" was released to streaming services in May 2020. By August 2024, the song had amassed over 315 million streams on Spotify. The song was featured in advertisements for companies including Mercedes-Benz, Meta, NBA, the Grammys, and White Claw.

== Charts ==
Chart performance for "Stunnin'"
Chart (2022)	Peak position
Canada (Canadian Hot 100)	36
Ireland (IRMA)	27
New Zealand Hot Singles (RMNZ)	21
UK Singles (OCC)	69
US Bubbling Under Hot 100	11

== Certifications ==
Certifications for "Stunnin'"
Region	Certification	Certified units/sales
Brazil (Pro-Música Brasil)	Platinum	40,000^{‡}
Canada (Music Canada)	2× Platinum	160,000^{‡}
New Zealand (RMNZ)	Gold	15,000^{‡}
Poland (ZPAV)	Gold	25,000^{‡}
United States (RIAA)	Gold	500,000^{‡}
^{‡} Sales+streaming figures based on certification alone.
