= 2025 Frisco Bowl =

Postseason college football bowl game

2025 Scooter's Coffee Frisco Bowl
- 8th Frisco Bowl
UNLV Rebels	Ohio Bobcats
(10–3)	(8–4)
MW	MAC
10	17
Head coach: Dan Mullen	Head coach: John Hauser (interim)
	1	2	3	4	Total
UNLV	0	0	3	7	10
Ohio	0	6	8	3	17
- Date: December 23, 2025
- Season: 2025
- Stadium: Ford Center at The Star
- Location: Frisco, Texas
- MVP: Offense: Sieh Bangura (RB, Ohio); Defense: Adonis Williams Jr. (S, Ohio)
- Favorite: UNLV by 6.5
- Referee: Tim Rich (American)
- Attendance: 6,521

United States TV coverage
- Network: ESPN
- Announcers: Wes Durham (play-by-play), Steve Addazio (analyst), and Dana Boyle (sideline)

The 2025 Frisco Bowl was a college football bowl game played on December 23, 2025, in Frisco, Texas. Due to ongoing renovations at the bowl's usual venue, Toyota Stadium, this edition was contested at Ford Center at The Star. The eighth annual Frisco Bowl began at approximately 8:00 p.m. CST and aired on ESPN. The Frisco Bowl was one of the 2025–26 bowl games concluding the 2025 FBS football season. The game was sponsored by coffeehouse chain Scooter's Coffee and officially known as the Scooter's Coffee Frisco Bowl.

The 2025 Frisco Bowl featured the UNLV Rebels (10–3) of the Mountain West Conference and the Ohio Bobcats (8–4) of the Mid-American Conference. Ohio beat UNLV by a score of 17–10.

== Teams ==
Based on conference tie-ins, the game was expected to feature teams from the American Conference and an at-large bid from any of the other Group of Five conferences. The matchup announced was with a team from the Mountain West Conference, UNLV, and a team from the Mid-American Conference (MAC), Ohio. This was the second meeting between the two programs; UNLV won their first meeting, played in 1988.

=== UNLV Rebels ===
UNLV opened their season with six consecutive wins, then lost back-to-back games; there record stood at 6–2 in early November. The Rebels completed their regular season with four consecutive wins, then lost the 2025 Mountain West Conference Football Championship Game to Boise State, who had also defeated UNLV in mid-October. The Rebels entered the Frisco Bowl with a 10–3 record.

=== Ohio Bobcats ===
Ohio lost two of their first three games, including a defeat to then top-ranked Ohio State. The Bobcats won seven of their remaining nine games, and entered the Frisco Bowl with an 8–4 record.

== Game summary ==
2025 Scooter's Coffee Frisco Bowl

Quarter	1	2	3	4	Total
UNLV	0	0	3	7	10
Ohio	0	6	8	3	17

at Ford Center at The Star • Frisco, Texas

- Date: Tuesday, December 23, 2025
- Game time: 8:00 p.m. CST
- Game weather: n/a (indoor)
- Game attendance: 6,521
- Referee: Tim Rich
- TV announcers (ESPN): Wes Durham (play-by-play), Steve Addazio (analyst), and Dana Boyle (sideline)
- Box score

=== Statistics ===
Statistics	UNLV	OHIO
First downs	18	19
Plays–yards	59–281	58–350
Rushes–yards	29–97	43–207
Passing yards	184	143
Passing: comp–att–int	19–30–1	11–15–1
Time of possession	28:00	32:00

Team	Category	Player	Statistics
UNLV	Passing	Anthony Colandrea	19/30, 184 yards, 1 INT
UNLV	Rushing	Jai'Den Thomas	11 carries, 51 yards
UNLV	Receiving	Jaden Bradley	4 receptions, 62 yards
Ohio	Passing	Parker Navarro	11/15, 143 yards, 1 INT
Ohio	Rushing	Sieh Bangura	19 carries, 149 yards, 1 TD
Ohio	Receiving	Chase Hendricks	4 receptions, 87 yards

== See also ==
- 2025 Xbox Bowl, played at the same venue
