= Dublin Mall =

Shopping Mall in Georgia

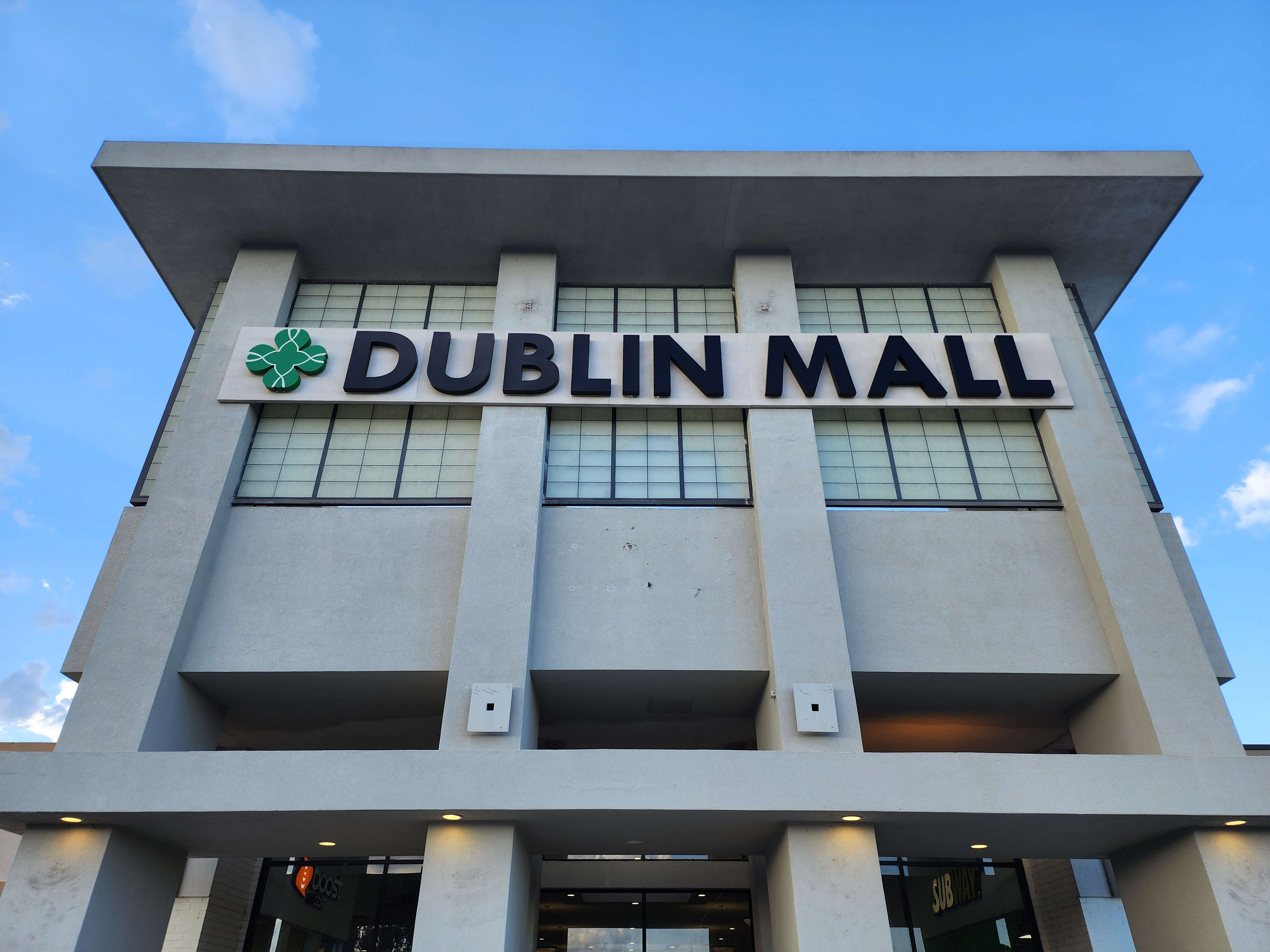
- Main Entrance to Dublin Mall in 2023
- Location: Dublin, Georgia, United States
- Coordinates: 32°32′35″N 82°57′0″W
- Opened: March 1972
- Developer: Jay Turner
- Owner: McKnight Properties
- Num. of stores: 22 (Space for 33)
- Num. of anchor tenants: 5 (2 Open, 3 Junior)
- Floor area: 340,195 sq ft (31,605.1 m^{2})
- Floors: 1
- Website: shopdublinmall.com

Dublin Mall is a regional shopping mall located in Laurens County, Georgia. The mall is mainly anchored by Belk and Southern Flair in the former JCPenney, with junior anchors TJ Maxx, OfficeMax and Farmers Home Furniture.

== History ==
Belk-Matthews was set to build a 36,000 square foot store at the developing mall, with construction costs totaling up over $500,000 at the time. The store opened its doors with a ribbon cutting ceremony on October 20, 1971, making it the 7th store in the Belk-Matthews family. Also opening during the ceremony was a mall branch for Morris Bank. The mall was owned by a man named Jay Turner.

Located on U.S 80 on the west side of Dublin, The mall officially opened all stores during the St. Patrick's Day festival in the town during March 1972. Woolco joined Belk-Matthews as anchors, with stores such as SupeRx drug, Garrett's Shoes, The Big Apple, Friedlander's, Friedman's Jewelers, Dunn's, Playland and more present at opening. Belk, Woolco, and later JCPenney would all leave downtown Dublin to join the mall, severely reducing sales and foot traffic in the downtown district.

In a 1978 expansion of the property, JCPenney was added to the mall on the north end, in addition to 3 new storefronts. Tenants during this time included Merle Norman Cosmetics, Music Emporium, Levigate, Hobb's Sporting Goods, Pearle Vision Center, RadioShack and more.

=== 1980s ===
In late 1982, it was announced that Woolco would be closing all 336 of its stores, including the one at Dublin Mall. Despite this, parent company F. W. Woolworth Company insisted the company was in no dire situation, and would most likely even improve under just the Woolworth branding.

In October 1983, the mall was sold to Miami based group I.R.E Financial for a total of $6.25 million.

=== 1990s ===
Goody's had plans announced in 1991 to open at several southern Georgia malls, including Dublin. These plans would be realized, and Goody's opened their doors at the mall in 1992.

Also in 1992, Belk-Matthews successfully reopened in November after an expansion, which brought the total store size to 60,000 square feet.

=== 2000s ===
Management duties for the mall during this time was handled by Hull Storey Development, who were known for buying struggling malls and renovating them.

By the end of February, 2000, a police substation was added to the mall. The purpose was to ease response times and allow the public easier access to services when needed.

In March 2003, it was announced that Goodwill would relocate into the Dublin Mall, next to JCPenney. The new store would have a drive-thru window for donating, and was scheduled to open on May 21.

On November 20, 2007, manager Hull Storey Retail Group LLC announced their intentions to sell off several properties, including Dublin Mall, to retail group Hendon Properties for a total of $214 million. However, Dublin Mall itself would never sell to this group. An article written on September 25, 2010 shows that Hull Property Group still owned the Dublin Mall.

Due to the ongoing Goody's bankruptcy, the 21,250 square foot store at Dublin mall closed its doors in 2009. Also in 2009, interior tenant Peacocks Mens Wear would close its doors in October. L Caulion Peacock had operated stores in the city for 50 years, and had been at the mall for 19 years.

=== 2010s ===
TJ Maxx would have a grand opening at the mall on May 22, 2011, replacing the space last occupied by Goody's. This would be the second TJMaxx location in middle Georgia. The owner of the property was still stated to be Hull property Group during this time.

On February 24, 2017, JCPenney announced a plan to close 138 underperforming stores, including the one at Dublin Mall.

National retailer Rue21 announced plans in April 2017 to close 400 stores, including the Dublin Mall location.

=== 2020s ===
In 2024, there were plans announced for a Tropical Smoothie Cafe, Jersey Mike's, and Aspen Dental to open in the mall area. A T-Mobile would fill the remaining empty space in between Tropical Smoothie Cafe and Jersey Mike's. Tropical Smoothie Cafe made its grand opening on January 10, 2025, giving one free smoothie per week for a year to the first 50 people to attend the grand opening. Aspen Dental opened November 21, 2024.

== Additional information ==
In late May to early June of every year except 2020, there has been an annual daylily exhibition show hosted by the Dublin Area Daylily Society. This event has been known to bring more foot traffic by those interested in exploring the show.
