= Frisco Bowl =

Annual college football postseason game

- Stadium: Ford Center at The Star
- Location: Frisco, Texas
- Previous stadiums: Toyota Stadium (2017–2024)
- Operated: 2017–present
- Conference tie-ins: American Conference
- Payout: US$650,000 (2019)
- Website: thefriscobowl.com
- Preceded by: Miami Beach Bowl

Sponsors
- DXL (2017–2018); Tropical Smoothie Cafe (2019–2021); Scooter's Coffee (2023–2025)

Former names
- DXL Frisco Bowl (2017–2018); Tropical Smoothie Cafe Frisco Bowl (2019–2021); Scooter's Coffee Frisco Bowl (2023–2025)

2025 matchup
- UNLV vs. Ohio (Ohio 17–10)

The Frisco Bowl is an annual National Collegiate Athletic Association (NCAA) sanctioned post-season Division I Football Bowl Subdivision (FBS) college football bowl game played in Frisco, Texas, since December 2017. The bowl has a tie-in with the American Conference, and chooses another team at-large. From 2017–2024, the bowl was played at Toyota Stadium in Frisco; starting in 2025, the game was relocated to the nearby Ford Center at The Star.

DXL was the bowl's inaugural sponsor from 2017 to 2018, followed by Tropical Smoothie Cafe from 2019 to 2021, and Scooter's Coffee from 2023 to 2025.

== History ==
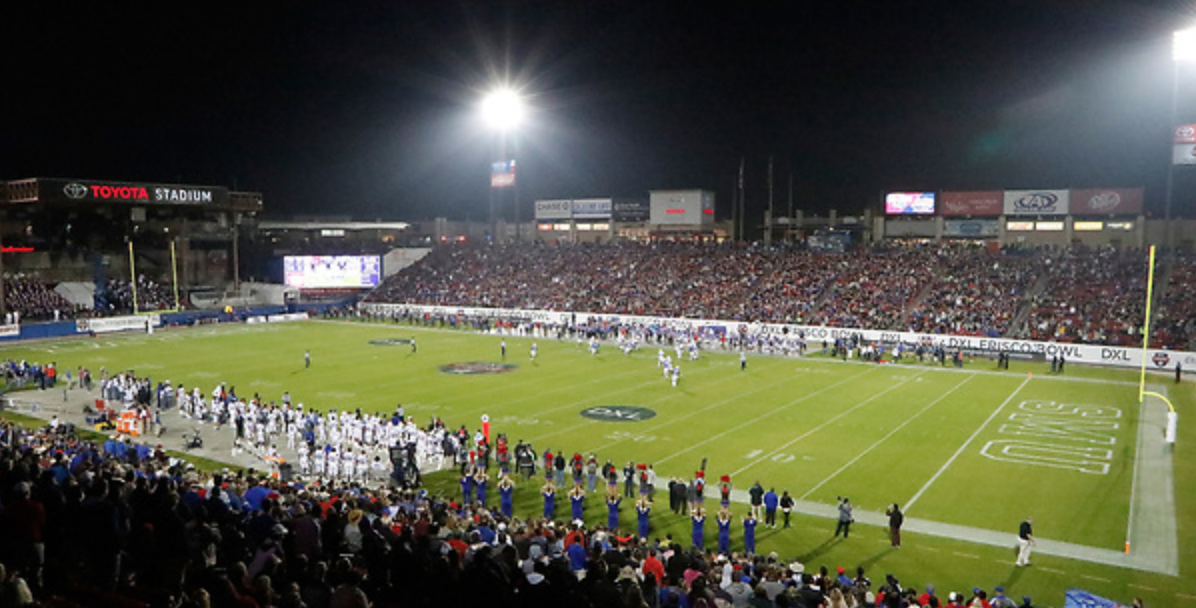
Toyota Stadium during the 2017 Frisco Bowl

On April 21, 2017, it was announced that the Miami Beach Bowl—which had been owned and operated by the American Athletic Conference (The American)—had been sold to ESPN Events and that it would relocate to Frisco, Texas, to be played in Toyota Stadium starting in the 2017 season. On November 8, 2017, it was announced that Destination XL Group, a retailer specializing in big and tall menswear, had signed on as the inaugural title sponsor of the bowl. On December 3, 2017, SMU and Louisiana Tech were announced as the teams for the inaugural playing of the bowl. In 2019, Tropical Smoothie Cafe became the new title sponsor. In 2023, Scooter's Coffee became the new title sponsor.

The 2020 Frisco Bowl was originally set to be contested by the SMU Mustangs, from The American, and the UTSA Roadrunners, from Conference USA. The game was slated to be the first matchup between the two teams. Two days after the matchup was announced, the 2020 edition was canceled due to COVID-19 concerns with the SMU football team.

The 2025 edition of the bowl was relocated to the Ford Center at The Star to accommodate renovations at Toyota Stadium, and the 2026 edition will be played at the Ford Center as well.

== Conference tie-ins ==
Initial planning had been to have teams from The American face a Sun Belt opponent in 2017 and 2019, and face a Mid-American Conference (MAC) opponent in 2018. In 2017, the inaugural game featured a matchup between The American and Conference USA (C-USA).

The Frisco Bowl then secured an affiliation with The American through the 2021 season, with opponents to be selected at-large. The 2018 matchup featured teams from the MAC and Mountain West, as The American was unable to provide a team, due to its champion, UCF, receiving a New Year's Six bowl bid. MAC and Mountain West teams again met in 2019, as The American's champion, Memphis, again received a New Year's Six bid.

== Game results ==
Rankings per AP Poll prior to the game being played.

Date	Winning Team		Losing Team		Attendance	Notes
December 20, 2017	Louisiana Tech	51	SMU	10	14,419	notes
December 19, 2018	Ohio	27	San Diego State	0	11,029	notes
December 20, 2019	Kent State	51	Utah State	41	12,120	notes
December 19, 2020	Cancelled due to the COVID-19 pandemic					
December 21, 2021	San Diego State	38	No. 24 UTSA	24	15,801	notes
December 17, 2022	Boise State	35	North Texas	32	12,211	notes
December 19, 2023	UTSA	35	Marshall	17	11,215	notes
December 17, 2024	No. 25 Memphis	42	West Virginia	37	12,022	notes
December 23, 2025	Ohio	17	UNLV	10	6,521	notes

== MVPs ==
Year	Offensive MVP			Defensive MVP			Ref.
Year	Player	College	Position	Player	College	Position	Ref.
2017	J'Mar Smith	Louisiana Tech	QB	Amik Robertson	Louisiana Tech	CB	
2018	A. J. Ouellette	Ohio	RB	Evan Croutch	Ohio	LB	
2019	Dustin Crum	Kent State	QB	Qwuantrezz Knight	Kent State	DB	
2021	Jesse Matthews	San Diego State	WR	CJ Baskerville	San Diego State	S	
2022	Taylen Green	Boise State	QB	Ezekial Noa	Boise State	LB	
2023	Joshua Cephus	UTSA	WR	Kam Alexander	UTSA	CB	
2024	Seth Henigan	Memphis	QB	Chandler Martin	Memphis	LB	
2025	Sieh Bangura	Ohio	RB	Adonis Williams Jr.	Ohio	S	

== Appearances by team ==
Updated through the December 2025 edition (8 games, 16 total appearances).

Teams with multiple appearances

Rank	Team	Appearances	Record	Win pct.
1	Ohio	2	2–0	1.000
1	San Diego State	2	1–1	.500
1	UTSA	2	1–1	.500

Teams with a single appearance

Won (4): Boise State, Kent State, Louisiana Tech, Memphis
Lost (6): Marshall, North Texas, SMU, UNLV, Utah State, West Virginia

== Appearances by conference ==
Updated through the December 2025 edition (8 games, 16 total appearances).

Conference	Record				Appearances by season	
Conference	Games	W	L	Win pct.	Won	Lost
Mountain West	5	2	3	.400	2021, 2022	2018, 2019, 2025
MAC	3	3	0	1.000	2018, 2019, 2025	
American	3	2	1	.667	2023, 2024	2017
C-USA	3	1	2	.333	2017	2021, 2022
Big 12	1	0	1	.000		2024
Sun Belt	1	0	1	.000		2023

== Game records ==
Team	Record, Team vs. Opponent	Year
Most points scored (one team)	51, shared by: Louisiana Tech vs. SMU; Kent State vs. Utah State	2017; 2019
Most points scored (losing team)	41, Utah State vs. Kent State	2019
Most points scored (both teams)	92, Kent State vs. Utah State	2019
Fewest points scored	0, San Diego State vs. Ohio	2018
Largest margin of victory	41, Louisiana Tech vs. SMU	2017
Total yards	550, Kent State vs. Utah State	2019
Rushing yards	318, Boise State vs. North Texas	2022
Passing yards	333, San Diego State vs. UTSA	2021
First downs	31, San Diego State vs. UTSA	2021
Fewest yards allowed	281, Ohio vs. UNLV	2025
Fewest rushing yards allowed	97, Ohio vs. UNLV	2025
Fewest passing yards allowed	127, Louisiana Tech vs. SMU	2017
Individual	Record, Player, Team vs. Opponent	Year
Total offense	436, Dustin Crum (Kent State)	2019
All-purpose yards	227, Juwan Washington (San Diego State)	2018
Total Touchdowns	4, shared by: J'Mar Smith (Louisiana Tech); Lucas Johnson (San Diego State)	2017; 2021
Touchdowns (all-purpose)	2, multiple players	
Rushing yards	178, Ashton Jeanty (Boise State)	2022
Rushing touchdowns	2, shared by: Nathan Rourke (Ohio); Taylen Green (Boise State); Ikaika Ragsdale (North Texas); CJ Donaldson Jr. (West Virginia)	2018; 2022; 2022; 2024
Passing yards	333, Lucas Johnson (San Diego State)	2021
Passing touchdowns	3, shared by: J'Mar Smith (Louisiana Tech); Jordan Love (Utah State); Lucas Johnson (San Diego State)	2017; 2019; 2021
Receptions	11, shared by: Jesse Matthews (San Diego State); Hudson Clement (West Virginia)	2021; 2024
Receiving yards	175, Jesse Matthews (San Diego State)	2021
Receiving touchdowns	2, shared by: Teddy Veal (Louisiana Tech); Siaosi Mariner (Utah State); Jesse Matthews (San Diego State); Hudson Clement (West Virginia)	2017; 2019; 2021; 2024
Tackles	14, Troy Lefeged Jr. (Utah State)	2019
Sacks	2, Nick Heninger (Utah State)	2019
Interceptions	1, multiple players	
Long Plays	Record, Player, Team vs. Opponent	Year
Touchdown run	57 yds., Deven Thompkins (Utah State)	2019
Touchdown pass	78 yds., Dustin Crum to Isaiah McKoy (Kent State)	2019
Kickoff return	65 yds,, Jaqwis Dancy (Louisiana Tech)	2017
Punt return	30 yds., Kylan Nelson (Ohio)	2018
Interception return	52 yds., Ezekiel Noa (Boise State)	2022
Fumble return	8 yds., Eric Kendzior (Louisiana Tech)	2017
Punt	56 yds., Magnus Haines (Ohio)	2025
Field goal	50 yds., Ramon Villela (UNLV)	2025

== Media coverage ==
The bowl has been televised by ESPN or ESPN2 since its inception.
