= ElyOtto =

Canadian musician (born 2004)

- Born: Elliott Ferrous-Martin Platt; February 24, 2004 (age 22); Calgary, Alberta, Canada
- Genres: Hyperpop; digicore
- Years active: 2017–present
- Labels: RCA, Otto Dynamite Ltd

Elliott Ferrous-Martin Platt (born February 24, 2004), known professionally as ElyOtto, is a Canadian hyperpop and pop musician. He (Note: ElyOtto's preferred pronouns are temperamental; he currently uses he/him pronouns.) is best known for his song "SugarCrash!", which went viral on TikTok in early 2021.

== Early life ==
Platt was born in Calgary, Alberta to Natasha (née Sayer) and Michael Platt, who are both musicians.

== Life and career ==
In 2020, Platt started a musical career, creating and uploading songs to SoundCloud.

His debut single "SugarCrash!" was released in August 2020, followed by the single "Teeth!". "SugarCrash!" went viral on TikTok after Ferrous-Martin Platt posted a video using the song to the platform a week after its release. In 2021, more than 5 million videos have been created using the song. It reached 85 million Spotify listens and a No. 1 spot on the streaming juggernaut's U.S. Viral 50 playlist in February. Spin magazine labeled him "the new face of hyperpop".

In April 2021, a remix of "SugarCrash!" featuring Kim Petras and Curtis Waters was released. His single "Profane" was released in August 2021, followed by the single "Stalker" also released in 2021.

Due to the success of the "SugarCrash!", he secured a contract with RCA Records. His debut EP was due for release later in 2022. In April 2022, Ferrous-Martin Platt released his debut album Hellscape Suburbia. By July 2023, ElyOtto released his second album Miscarriage of a Wildhorse, and followed up shortly with an EP, Happy Together Convenience Store.

He has 1 million Spotify monthly listeners, and "SugarCrash!" stands at just over 400 million streams. He also continues to release eclectic singles on SoundCloud.

== Discography ==
=== Albums ===
Title	Mixtape details
Hellscape Suburbia	Released: April 8, 2022; Label: RCA; Formats: Digital download, streaming
MISCARRIAGE OF A WILDHORSE	Released: July 14, 2023; Label: Otto Dynamite Ltd; Formats: Digital download, streaming
Happy Together Convenience Store	Released: August 25, 2023; Label: Otto Dynamite Ltd; Formats: Digital download, streaming

=== Singles ===
==== As lead artist ====
Title	Year	Peak chart positions						Album
Title	Year	CAN	UK	UK Ind.	US Bub.	US Rock	WW	Album
"Lost"	2017	―	―	―	―	―	―	Non-album single
"SugarCrash!" (solo or featuring Kim Petras and Curtis Waters)	2020	81	59	9	123	10	126	Non-album single
"Let Go :("	2020	—	—	—	—	—	—	Non-album single
"Teeth!"	2020	—	—	—	—	—	—	Non-album single
"Luv Me Better" (with D-frank Africa)	2021	—	—	—	—	—	—	Non-album single
"Profane"	2021	—	—	—	—	—	—	Hellscape Suburbia
"stalker"	2021	—	—	—	—	—	—	Hellscape Suburbia
"The Cops" (featuring Tokyo Ghetto Pussy)	2021	—	—	—	—	—	—	Hellscape Suburbia
"GREEN APPLE PASTE"	2023	—	—	—	—	—	—	MISCARRIAGE OF A WILDHORSE
"HORSE MEDICINE"	2023	—	—	—	—	—	—	MISCARRIAGE OF A WILDHORSE
"NEON GENESIS EVANGELION"	2023	—	—	—	—	—	—	MISCARRIAGE OF A WILDHORSE
"DOGGY"	2023	—	—	—	—	—	—	Non-album single
"TOKESTER" (featuring Dr0wsi)	2024	—	—	—	—	—	—	Non-album single
"PsychoHeresy"	2024	—	—	—	—	—	—	Non-album single
"—" denotes single that did not chart or was not released.

==== As featured artist ====
Title	Year	Album
"Dread" (Jaddex featuring ElyOtto)	2020	Non-album singles
"Purple Guy Emoji" (Slop Culture featuring ElyOtto and lilcenz)	2020	Non-album singles
"Glisten." (Holden Kane featuring ElyOtto and COPE)	2021	Non-album singles
"Barbie Boy" (Dorian Electra featuring ElyOtto)	2021	My Agenda (Deluxe)
"Everytiime w3 t0uch" (Plasmic featuring ElyOtto and tracey brakes)	2024	Non-album singles
