= Bottom-up =

Bottom-up may refer to:

- Bottom-up analysis, a fundamental analysis technique in accounting and finance
- Bottom-up parsing, a computer science strategy
- Bottom-up processing, in Pattern recognition (psychology)
- Bottom-up theories of galaxy formation and evolution
- Bottom-up tree automaton, in data structures
- Bottom-up integration testing, in software testing
- Top-down and bottom-up design, strategies of information processing and knowledge ordering
- Bottom-up proteomics, a laboratory technique involving proteins
- Bottom Up Records, a record label founded by Shyheim
- Bottom-up approach of the Holocaust, a viewpoint on the causes of the Holocaust

== See also ==
- Bottoms Up (disambiguation)
- Top-down (disambiguation)
- Capsizing, when a boat is turned upside down
- Mundanity, a precursor of social movements
- Social movements, bottom-up societal reform
- Turtling (sailing)
