= 2025 UNLV Rebels football team =

American college football season

2025 UNLV Rebels football

MW Championship Game, L 21–38 at Boise State

Frisco Bowl, L 10–17 vs. Ohio
- Conference: Mountain West Conference
- Record: 10–4 (6–2 MW)
- Head coach: Dan Mullen (1st season)
- Offensive coordinator: Corey Dennis (1st season)
- Offensive scheme: Spread
- Defensive coordinator: Paul Guenther (interim; 1st season)
- Base defense: Multiple 4–2–5
- Home stadium: Allegiant Stadium

2025 Mountain West Conference football standings
	Conf.			Overall
Team	W		L	W		L
Boise State y$	6	–	2	9	–	5
UNLV y	6	–	2	10	–	4
San Diego State	6	–	2	9	–	4
New Mexico	6	–	2	9	–	4
Fresno State	5	–	3	9	–	4
Hawaii	5	–	3	9	–	4
Utah State	4	–	4	6	–	7
Air Force	3	–	5	4	–	8
Nevada	2	–	6	3	–	9
Wyoming	2	–	6	4	–	8
San Jose State	2	–	6	3	–	9
Colorado State	1	–	7	2	–	10
Championship: Boise State 38, UNLV 21
$ – Conference champion; y – Championship game participant; Rankings from CFP Rankings

The 2025 UNLV Rebels football team represented the University of Nevada, Las Vegas (UNLV) as a member of the Mountain West Conference (MW) during the 2025 NCAA Division I FBS football season. Led by first-year head coach Dan Mullen, the Rebels played their home games at Allegiant Stadium in Paradise, Nevada.

== Schedule ==
Date	Time	Opponent	Site	TV	Result	Attendance
August 23	1:00 p.m.	Idaho State*	Allegiant Stadium; Paradise, NV	MW Network/KVVU	W 38–31	25,723
August 29	6:30 p.m.	at Sam Houston*	Shell Energy Stadium; Houston, TX	CBSSN	W 38–21	5,837
September 6	5:00 p.m.	UCLA*	Allegiant Stadium; Paradise, NV	CBSSN	W 30–23	36,117
September 20	9:00 a.m.	at Miami (OH)*	Yager Stadium; Oxford, OH	ESPNU	W 41–38	12,625
October 4	4:00 p.m.	at Wyoming	War Memorial Stadium; Laramie, WY	CBSSN	W 31–17	19,861
October 11	12:30 p.m.	Air Force^{†}	Allegiant Stadium; Paradise, NV	CBSSN	W 51–48	32,932
October 18	12:30 p.m.	at Boise State	Albertsons Stadium; Boise, ID	FS1	L 31–56	32,927
November 1	12:00 p.m.	New Mexico	Allegiant Stadium; Paradise, NV	MW Network/KVVU	L 35–40	25,972
November 8	6:30 p.m.	at Colorado State	Canvas Stadium; Fort Collins, CO	FS1	W 42–10	27,970
November 15	4:00 p.m.	Utah State	Allegiant Stadium; Paradise, NV	CBSSN	W 29–26 ^{2OT}	31,682
November 21	7:30 p.m.	Hawaii	Allegiant Stadium; Paradise, NV	FS1	W 38–10	37,106
November 29	6:00 p.m.	at Nevada	Mackay Stadium; Reno, NV (Fremont Cannon)	CBSSN	W 42–17	17,912
December 5	5:00 p.m.	at Boise State	Albertsons Stadium; Boise, ID (MW Conference Championship Game)	FOX	L 21–38	27,152
December 23	6:00 p.m.	vs. Ohio*	Ford Center at The Star; Frisco, TX (Frisco Bowl)	ESPN	L 10–17	6,521
*Non-conference game; ^{†}Homecoming; All times are in Pacific time

== Rankings ==
Ranking movements Legend: ██ Increase in ranking ██ Decrease in ranking — = Not ranked RV = Received votes
	Week																
Poll	Pre	1	2	3	4	5	6	7	8	9	10	11	12	13	14	15	Final
AP	RV	RV	RV	RV	RV	RV	RV	RV	—	—	—	RV	RV	RV	RV	RV	—
Coaches	RV	—	RV	RV	RV	RV	RV	RV	RV	RV	—	—	—	RV	RV	RV	—
CFP	Not released										—	—	—	—	—	—	Not released

== Preseason ==
The Mountain West's preseason media poll was released on July 16, 2025. UNLV was predicted to finish second in the conference.

== Game summaries ==
=== Idaho State (FCS) ===
Idaho State Bengals (FCS) (0–0) at UNLV Rebels (0–0) – Game summary

Quarter	1	2	3	4	Total
Bengals (FCS)	10	7	7	7	31
Rebels	0	14	10	14	38

at Allegiant Stadium • Paradise, NV

- Date: August 23
- Game time: 1:00 p.m. PDT
- Game weather: None (played indoors)
- Game attendance: 25,723
- Referee: Christian Watson
- TV announcers (MW Network/KVVU): Matt Neverett (play-by-play), Caleb Herring (analyst) and Steve Cofield (sideline)

Game information

First quarter

- IDST – Trajan Sinatra 26-yard field goal, 11:14. Bengals 3–0. Drive: 10 plays, 67 yards, 3:46.
- IDST – Jordan Cooke 15-yard pass from Michael Shulikov (Trajan Sinatra kick), 5:49. Bengals 10–0. Drive: 6 plays, 80 yards, 2:54.

Second quarter

- UNLV – Jai'Den Thomas 3-yard run (Ramon Villela kick), 10:34. Bengals 10–7. Drive: 5 plays, 64 yards, 2:06.
- UNLV – Jai'Den Thomas 70-yard run (Ramon Villela kick), 7:12. Rebels 14–10. Drive: 4 plays, 80 yards, 1:38.
- IDST – Dason Brooks 27-yard run (Trajan Sinatra kick), 2:06. Bengals 17–14. Drive: 5 plays, 50 yards, 1:31.

Third quarter

- UNLV – Jai'Den Thomas 3-yard run (Ramon Villela kick), 11:57. Rebels 21–17. Drive: 9 plays, 93 yards, 2:53.
- UNLV – Ramon Villela 26-yard field goal, 6:00. Rebels 24–17. Drive: 7 plays, 71 yards, 2:28.
- IDST – Ian Duarte 64-yard pass from Jordan Cooke (Trajan Sinatra kick), 4:15. Tied 24–24. Drive: 5 plays, 81 yards, 1:38.

Fourth quarter

- IDST – Dason Brooks 2-yard run (Trajan Sinatra kick), 13:40. Bengals 31–24. Drive: 11 plays, 75 yards, 3:42.
- UNLV – Daejon Reynolds 9-yard pass from Anthony Colandrea (Ramon Villela kick), 11:26. Tied 31–31. Drive: 6 plays, 75 yards, 2:14.
- UNLV – Alex Orji 11-yard run (Ramon Villela kick), 8:51. Rebels 38–31. Drive: 4 plays, 20 yards, 1:44.

Statistics	IDST	UNLV
First downs	30	25
Plays–yards	77–555	68–532
Rushes–yards	25–160	44–300
Passing yards	395	232
Passing: Comp–Att–Int	31–52–4	18–24–0
Turnovers	4	1
Time of possession	28:48	31:12

Team	Category	Player	Statistics
Idaho State	Passing	Jordan Cooke	30/50, 380 yards, TD, 3 INT
Idaho State	Rushing	Dason Brooks	18 carries, 132 yards, 2 TD
Idaho State	Receiving	Ian Duarte	6 receptions, 105 yards, TD
UNLV	Passing	Anthony Colandrea	15/21, 195 yards, TD
UNLV	Rushing	Jai'Den Thomas	10 carries, 147 yards, 3 TD
UNLV	Receiving	Jaden Bradley	6 receptions, 131 yards

=== at Sam Houston ===
Game Two – UNLV Rebels (1–0) at Sam Houston Bearkats (0–1) – Game summary

Quarter	1	2	3	4	Total
Rebels	14	10	7	7	38
Bearkats	7	0	0	14	21

at Shell Energy Stadium • Houston, TX

- Date: Friday August 29, 2025
- Game time: 6:30 p.m. PDT
- Game attendance: 5,837
- Referee: Rodney Burnette
- TV announcers (CBSSN): Rich Waltz (play-by-play), Robert Turbin (analyst) and Tiffany Blackmon (sideline)

Game information

First quarter

- UNLV – Jaden Bradley 43-yard pass from Anthony Colandrea (Ramon Villela kick), 12:19. Rebels 7–0. Drive: 5 plays, 68 yards, 2:33.
- SHSU – Hunter Watson 6-yard run (RJ Lopez kick), 8:42. Tied 7–7. Drive: 12 plays, 75 yards, 3:37.
- UNLV – DeAngelo Irvin Jr. 3-yard pass from Anthony Colandrea (Ramon Villela kick), 0:32. Rebels 14–7. Drive: 13 plays, 75 yards, 8:10.

Second quarter

- UNLV – Ramon Villela 29-yard field goal, 9:41. Rebels 17–7. Drive: 12 plays, 70 yards, 5:08.
- UNLV – Aaamaris Brown 52-yard interception return (Ramon Villela kick), 7:15. Rebels 24–7.

Third quarter

- UNLV – Jai'Den Thomas 3-yard run (Ramon Villela kick), 11:22. Rebels 31–7. Drive: 5 plays, 67 yards, 1:59.

Fourth quarter

- SHSU – Landan Brown 53-yard run (pass failed), 14:15. Rebels 31–13. Drive: 6 plays, 73 yards, 2:23.
- UNLV – Anthony Colandrea 13-yard run (Ramon Villela kick), 7:05. Rebels 38–13. Drive: 6 plays, 51 yards, 2:52.
- SHSU – Tim Burns Jr. 59-yard pass from Mabrey Mettauer (Mabrey Mettauer-Qua'Vez Humphreys pass), 5:01. Rebels 38–21. Drive: 5 plays, 68 yards, 1:57.

Statistics	UNLV	SHSU
First downs	21	20
Plays–yards	56–404	70–332
Rushes–yards	33–155	35–145
Passing yards	249	187
Passing: Comp–Att–Int	19–23–1	19–35–1
Turnovers	1	1
Time of possession	29:42	30:18

Team	Category	Player	Statistics
UNLV	Passing	Anthony Colandrea	19/23, 249 yards, 2 TD, INT
UNLV	Rushing	Jai'Den Thomas	9 carries, 65 yards, TD
UNLV	Receiving	Jaden Bradley	6 receptions, 125 yards, TD
Sam Houston	Passing	Hunter Watson	11/22, 101 yards
Sam Houston	Rushing	Landan Brown	10 carries, 85 yards, TD
Sam Houston	Receiving	Tim Burns Jr.	1 reception, 59 yards, TD

=== UCLA ===
UCLA Bruins (0–1) at UNLV Rebels (2–0) – Game summary

Quarter	1	2	3	4	Total
Bruins	0	3	10	10	23
Rebels	10	13	0	7	30

at Allegiant Stadium • Paradise, NV

- Date: September 6, 2025
- Game time: 5:00 p.m. PDT
- Game weather: Indoor
- Game attendance: 36,117
- Referee: Bryan Banks
- TV announcers (CBSSN): Rich Waltz (play-by-play), Robert Turbin (analyst) & Jordan Giorgio (sideline)

Game information

First quarter

- UNLV – Ramon Villela 50-yard field goal, 8:01. UNLV 3–0, Drive: 11 plays, 43 yards, 6:59.
- UNLV – Nick Elksnis 21-yard pass from Anthony Colandrea (Ramon Villela kick), 0:13. UNLV 10–0, Drive: 6 plays, 81 yards, 4:28.

Second quarter

- UNLV – Troy Omeire 21-yard pass from Anthony Colandrea (Ramon Villela kick), 5:39. UNLV 17–0, Drive: 11 plays, 87 yards, 5:38.
- UNLV – Keyvone Lee 19-yard run, 1:49. UNLV 23–0, Drive: 5 plays, 44 yards, 1:41.
- UCLA – Mateen Bhagani 33-yard field goal, 0:04. UNLV 23–3, Drive: 9 plays, 46 yards, 1:31.

Third quarter

- UCLA – Noah Fox-Flores 4-yard pass from Nico Iamaleava (Mateen Bhaghani kick), 7:48. UNLV 23–10, Drive: 12 plays, 75 yards, 7:12.
- UCLA – Mateen Bhagani 35-yard field goal, 0:03. UNLV 23–13, Drive: 14 plays, 52 yards, 6:50.

Fourth quarter

- UNLV – Var'Keyes Gumms 17-yard pass from Anthony Colandrea (Ramon Villela kick), 12:04. UNLV 30–13, Drive: 6 plays, 75 yards, 2:59.
- UCLA – Nico Iamaleava 30-yard run (Mateen Bhagnani kick), 8:50. UNLV 30–20, Drive: 8 plays, 78 yards, 3:08.
- UCLA – Mateen Bhagnani 33-yard field goal, 5:25. UNLV 30–23, Drive: 6 plays, 42 yards, 1:35.

Statistics	UCLA	UNLV
First downs	27	20
Total yards	428	351
Rushing yards	173	148
Passing yards	255	203
Passing: Comp–Att–Int	29–42–1	15–21–0
Turnovers	2	0
Time of possession	31:26	28:34

Team	Category	Player	Statistics
UCLA	Passing	Nico Iamaleava	29/41, 255 yards, TD, INT
UCLA	Rushing	Nico Iamaleava	11 carries, 59 yards, TD
UCLA	Receiving	Kwazi Gilmer	8 receptions, 87 yards
UNLV	Passing	Anthony Colandrea	15/21, 203 yards, 3 TD
UNLV	Rushing	Anthony Colandrea	11 carries, 59 yards
UNLV	Receiving	Var'keyes Gumms	3 receptions, 40 yards, TD

=== at Miami (OH) ===
UNLV Rebels (3–0) at Miami RedHawks (0–2) – Game summary

Quarter	1	2	3	4	Total
Rebels	0	10	14	17	41
RedHawks	14	10	14	0	38

at Yager Stadium • Oxford, OH

- Date: September 20, 2025
- Game time: 9:00 a.m. PDT
- Game weather: Cloudy • Temperature: 80 °F (27 °C) • Wind: SE at 3 miles per hour (4.8 km/h)
- Game attendance: 12,625
- Referee: Andrew Speciale
- TV announcers (ESPNU): Matt Schumacker (play-by-play) and Dustin Fox (analyst)

Game information

First quarter

- (10:15) MIA – Kenny Tracy 29-yard pass from Dequan Finn, Dom Dzioban kick (Drive: 1 play, 29 yards, 0:08; Miami (OH) 7–0)
- (3:25) MIA – Keith Reynolds 3-yard pass from Dequan Finn, Dom Dzioban kick (Drive: 7 plays, 91 yards, 4:01; Miami (OH) 14–0)

Second quarter

- (14:18) UNLV – Ramon Villela 27-yard field goal (Drive: 11 plays, 69 yards, 3:37; Miami (OH) 14–3)
- (10:41) UNLV – Aamaris Brown 67-yard interception, Ramon Villela kick (Miami (OH) 14–10)
- (8:10) MIA – Kenny Tracy 22-yard pass from Henry Hesson, Dom Dzioban kick (Drive: 6 plays, 75 yards, 2:31; Miami (OH) 21–10)
- (0:24) MIA – Dom Dzioban 40-yard field goal (Drive: 10 plays, 50 yards, 1:21; Miami (OH) 24–10)

Third quarter

- (12:45) UNLV – Jai'Den Thomas 3-yard run, Ramon Villela kick (Drive: 5 plays, 65 yards, 2:15; Miami (OH) 24–17)
- (7:45) UNLV – Jaden Bradley 4-yard pass from Anthony Colandrea, Ramon Villela kick (Drive: 9 plays, 66 yards, 4:14; Tied 24–24)
- (7:33) MIA – Keith Reynolds 100-yard kickoff return, Dom Dzioban kick (Miami (OH) 31–24)
- (6:19) MIA – Corban Hondru 47-yard interception, Dom Dzioban kick (Miami (OH) 38–24)

Fourth quarter

- (13:13) UNLV – Taeshaun Lyon 9-yard pass from Anthony Colandrea, Ramon Villela kick (Drive: 17 plays, 87 yards, 8:00; Miami (OH) 38–31)
- (6:50) UNLV – Keyvone Lee 1-yard run, Ramon Villela kick (Drive: 7 plays, 49 yards, 4:02; Tied 38–38)
- (0:15) UNLV – Ramon Villela 23-yard field goal (Drive: 9 plays, 78 yards, 2:17; UNLV 41–38)

Statistics	UNLV	M-OH
First downs	30	19
Plays–yards	86–515	53–396
Rushes–yards	43–222	22–131
Passing yards	293	265
Passing: Comp–Att–Int	29–43–2	15–31–2
Turnovers	2	3
Time of possession	37:43	21:52

Team	Category	Player	Statistics
UNLV	Passing	Anthony Colandrea	29/43, 293 yards, 2 TD, 2 INT
UNLV	Rushing	Jai'Den Thomas	13 carries, 118 yards, TD
UNLV	Receiving	Jaden Bradley	7 receptions, 93 yards, TD
Miami (OH)	Passing	Henry Hesson	8/17, 134 yards, TD
Miami (OH)	Rushing	Kenny Tracy	16 carries, 104 yards
Miami (OH)	Receiving	Kam Perry	5 receptions, 122 yards

=== at Wyoming ===
UNLV Rebels (4–0) at Wyoming Cowboys (2–2) – Game summary

Quarter	1	2	3	4	Total
Rebels	17	7	0	7	31
Cowboys	3	0	7	7	17

at War Memorial Stadium • Laramie, WY

- Date: October 4, 2025
- Game time: 5:00 p.m. MDT
- Game weather: Cloudy • Temperature: 41 °F (5 °C) • Wind: SW 20 mph
- Game attendance: 19,861
- Referee: Kenneth Ray
- TV announcers (CBSSN): Dave Ryan (play-by-play) and Adam Breneman (analyst)

Game information

First quarter

- (12:59) WYO – Erik Sandvik 36-yard field goal (Drive: 4 plays, 1 yard, 1:55; Wyoming 3–0)
- (9:18) UNLV – Keyvone Lee 6-yard run, Ramon Villela kick (Drive: 6 plays, 67 yards, 3:34; UNLV 7–3)
- (6:29) UNLV – Kayden McGee 16-yard punt return, Ramon Villela kick (UNLV 14–3)
- (1:36) UNLV – Ramon Villela 36-yard field goal (Drive: 9 plays, 17 yards, 3:13; UNLV 17–3)

Second quarter

- (0:59) UNLV – Jaden Bradley 13-yard punt return, Ramon Villela kick (UNLV 24–3)

Third quarter

- (12:46) WYO – Deion DeBlanc 12-yard run, Erik Sandvik kick (Drive: 5 plays, 75 yards, 2:14; UNLV 24–10)

Fourth quarter

- (6:20) UNLV – Jai'Den Thomas 8-yard pass from Anthony Colandrea, Ramon Villela kick (Drive: 10 plays, 69 yards, 5:31; UNLV 31–10)
- (1:55) WYO – Justin Erb 6-yard pass from Kaden Anderson, Erik Sandvik kick (Drive: 12 plays, 75 yards, 4:25; UNLV 31–17)

Statistics	UNLV	WYO
First downs	15	21
Plays–yards	59–255	72–356
Rushes–yards	39–153	26–102
Passing yards	102	254
Passing: Comp–Att–Int	11–20–0	25–46–1
Turnovers	1	3
Time of possession	30:22	29:38

Team	Category	Player	Statistics
UNLV	Passing	Anthony Colandrea	11/20, 102 yards, TD
UNLV	Rushing	Jai'Den Thomas	16 carries, 96 yards
UNLV	Receiving	Jaden Bradley	5 receptions, 65 yards
Wyoming	Passing	Kaden Anderson	25/46, 254 yards, TD, INT
Wyoming	Rushing	Sam Scott	11 carries, 49 yards
Wyoming	Receiving	Jaylen Sargent	4 receptions, 55 yards

=== Air Force ===
Air Force Falcons (1–4) at UNLV Rebels (5–0) – Game summary

Quarter	1	2	3	4	Total
Falcons	7	14	7	20	48
Rebels	7	6	16	22	51

at Allegiant Stadium • Paradise, NV

- Date: October 11
- Game time: 1:30 p.m. MDT / 12:30 p.m. PDT
- Game weather: None (played indoors)
- Game attendance: 32,932
- Referee: Patrick Foy
- TV announcers (CBSSN): Rich Waltz (play-by-play), Robert Turbin (analyst) and Tiffany Blackmon (sideline)

Game information
First quarter
- UNLV – Anthony Colandrea 3-yard run (Ramon Villela kick), 4:10. Rebels 7–0. Drive: 3 plays, 68 yards, 1:21.
- AFA – Cade Harris 5-yard run (Reagan Tubbs kick), 1:50. Tied 7–7. Drive: 6 plays, 75 yards, 2:20.

Second quarter

- UNLV – Ramon Villela 45-yard field goal, 13:33. Rebels 10–7. Drive: 8 plays, 54 yards, 3:11.
- AFA – Owen Allen 21-yard run (Reagan Tubbs kick), 10:17. Falcons 14–10. Drive: 6 plays, 70 yards, 3:16.
- AFA – Owen Allen 28-yard run (Reagan Tubbs kick), 4:26. Falcons 21–10. Drive: 6 plays, 52 yards, 3:09.
- UNLV – Ramon Villela 32-yard field goal, 0:50. Falcons 21–13. Drive: 11 plays, 61 yards, 3:36.

Third quarter

- UNLV – Var'Keyes Gumms 16-yard pass from Jaden Bradley (Ramon Villela kick), 14:49. Falcons 21–20. Drive: 1 play, 16 yards, 0:05.
- UNLV – Daejon Reynolds 86-yard pass from Anthony Colandrea (pass failed), 13:05. Rebels 26–21. Drive: 1 play, 86 yards, 0:13.
- AFA – Bruin Fleischmann 17-yard pass from Liam Szarka (Jacob Medina kick), 10:08. Falcons 28–26. Drive: 6 plays, 75 yards, 2:59.
- UNLV – Ramon Villela 20-yard field goal, 5:25. Rebels 29–28. Drive: 10 plays, 73 yards, 4:43.

Fourth quarter

- AFA – Liam Szarka 1-yard run (run failed), 14:20. Falcons 34–29. Drive: 12 plays, 75 yards, 6:05.
- UNLV – Keyvone Lee 2-yard run (Keyvone Lee run), 11:26. Rebels 37–34. Drive: 7 plays, 75 yards, 2:54.
- AFA – Cade Harris 4-yard run (Jacob Medina kick), 6:09. Falcons 41–37. Drive: 11 plays, 75 yards, 5:17.
- UNLV – Jai'Den Thomas 51-yard run (Ramon Villela kick), 4:55. Rebels 44–41. Drive: 3 plays, 75 yards, 1:14.
- AFA – Liam Szarka 9-yard run (Jacob Medina kick), 1:13. Falcons 48–44. Drive: 11 plays, 75 yards, 3:42.
- UNLV – Anthony Colandrea 19-yard run (Ramon Villela kick), 0:36. Rebels 51–48. Drive: 6 plays, 75 yards, 0:37.

Statistics	AFA	UNLV
First downs	32	24
Plays–yards	83–603	60–597
Rushes–yards	66–428	27–220
Passing yards	175	377
Passing: Comp–Att–Int	10–17–0	21–33–0
Turnovers	1	0
Time of possession	36:51	23:09

Team	Category	Player	Statistics
Air Force	Passing	Liam Szarka	10/17, 175 yards, TD
Air Force	Rushing	Owen Allen	17 carries, 192 yards, 2 TD
Air Force	Receiving	Jonah Dawson	3 receptions, 79 yards
UNLV	Passing	Anthony Colandrea	20/32, 361 yards, TD
UNLV	Rushing	Jai'Den Thomas	11 carries, 88 yards, TD
UNLV	Receiving	Deajon Renyolds	4 receptions, 139 yards, TD

=== at Boise State ===
UNLV Rebels (6–0) at Boise State Broncos (4–2) – Game summary

Quarter	1	2	3	4	Total
Rebels	3	21	0	7	31
Broncos	14	14	21	7	56

at Albertsons Stadium • Boise, ID

- Date: October 18, 2025
- Game time: 12:30 p.m. PDT
- Game weather: Sunny • Temperature: 55 °F (13 °C) • Wind: W at 3 miles per hour (4.8 km/h)
- Game attendance: 32,927
- Referee: Nolan Dumas
- TV announcers (FS1): Dan Hellie (play-by-play) and Petros Papadakis (analyst)

Game information

First quarter

- (11:26) BOIS - Sire Gaines 2-yard run, Colton Boomer kick (Drive: 6 plays, 60 yards, 2:13; Boise State 7-0)
- (3:10) UNLV – Ramon Villela 38-yard field goal (Drive: 6 plays, 35 yards, 3:05; Boise State 7-3)
- (1:14) BOIS - Cameron Bates 35-yard run, Colton Boomer kick (Drive: 4 plays, 75 yards, 1:56; Boise State 14-3)

Second quarter

- (9:33) UNLV - Jai'Den Thomas 1-yard run, Ramon Villela kick (Drive: 4 plays, 16 yards, 1:28; Boise State 14-10)
- (7:40) BOIS - Latrell Caples 7-yard pass from Maddux Madsen, Colton Boomer kick (Drive: 4 plays, 76 yards, 1:47; Boise State 21-10)
- (5:09) UNLV - Jaden Bradley 35-yard pass from Anthony Colandrea, Roman Villela kick (Drive: 6 plays, 75 yards, 2:31; Boise State 21-17)
- (4:24) BOIS - Dylan Riley 49-yard run, Colton Boomer kick (Drive: 2 plays, 75 yards, 0:45; Boise State 28-17)
- (0:43) UNLV - Anthony Colandrea 8-yard run, Ramon Villela kick (Drive: 5 plays, 67 yards, 0:30; Boise State 28-24)

Third quarter

- (9:38) BOIS - Sire Gaines 20-yard pass from Maddux Madsen, Colton Boomer kick (Drive: 3 plays, 68 yards, 1:04; Boise State 35-24)
- (2:21) BOIS - Chris Marshall 32-yard pass from Maddux Madsen, Colton Boomer kick (Drive: 6 plays, 88 yards, 3:27; Boise State 42-24)
- (0:54) BOIS - A'Marion McCoy 60-yard interception return, Colton Boomer kick (Boise State 49-24)

Fourth quarter

- (5:11) BOIS - Malik Sherrod 21-yard pass from Maddux Madsen, Colton Boomer kick (Drive: 12 plays, 82 yards, 7:52; Boise State 56-24)
- (2:45) UNLV - Troy Omeire 17-yard pass from Anthony Colandrea, Ramon Villela kick (Drive: 5 plays, 72 yards, 2:18; Boise State 56-31)

Statistics	UNLV	BOIS
First downs	22	21
Plays–yards	70–476	57–558
Rushes–yards	40–261	33–294
Passing yards	215	264
Passing: Comp–Att–Int	18–30–1	15–24–1
Turnovers	1	2
Time of possession	32:07	27:53

Team	Category	Player	Statistics
UNLV	Passing	Anthony Colandrea	18/30, 215 yards, 2 TD, INT
UNLV	Rushing	Jaylon Glover	6 carries, 112 yards
UNLV	Receiving	Deangelo Irvin Jr.	4 receptions, 90 yards
Boise State	Passing	Maddux Madsen	14/23, 253 yards, 4 TD, INT
Boise State	Rushing	Dylan Riley	15 carries, 201 yards, TD
Boise State	Receiving	Chris Marshall	3 receptions, 96 yards, TD

=== New Mexico ===
New Mexico Lobos (5–3) at UNLV Rebels (6–1) – Game summary

Quarter	1	2	3	4	Total
Lobos	7	24	3	6	40
Rebels	0	21	7	7	35

at Allegiant Stadium • Paradise, NV

- Date: November 1, 2025
- Game time: 12:00 p.m.
- Game weather: none (played indoors)
- Game attendance: 25,972
- Referee: Gary Reed
- TV announcers (MW Network/KVVU): Matt Neverett (play-by-play) and Caleb Herring (analyst)

Game information

First quarter

- UNM – Damon Bankston 30-yard pass from Jack Layne (Luke Drzewiecki kick), 4:09. Lobos 7–0. Drive: 10 plays, 78 yards, 5:08.

Second quarter

- UNM – Simon Mapa 12-yard pass from James Laubstein (Luke Drzewiecki kick), 14:52. Lobos 14–0. Drive: 3 plays, 71 yards, 1:03.
- UNM – Damon Bankston 84-yard pass from Jack Layne (Luke Drzewiecki kick), 12:43. Lobos 21–0. Drive: 1 play, 84 yards, 0:13.
- UNLV – Daejon Reynolds 7-yard pass from Anthony Colandrea (Ramon Villela kick), 8:55. Lobos 21–7. Drive: 9 plays, 82 yards, 3:42.
- UNLV – Keyvone Lee 5-yard run (Ramon Villela kick), 3:14. Lobos 21–14. Drive: 7 plays, 69 yards, 3:29.
- UNLV – Quandarius Keyes 25-yard interception return (Ramon Villela kick), 2:20. Tied 21–21.
- UNM – Keagan Johnson 80-yard pass from Jack Layne (Luke Drzewiecki kick), 1:49. Lobos 28–21. Drive: 2 plays, 84 yards, 0:27.
- UNM – Luke Drzewiecki 46-yard field goal, 0:00. Lobos 31–21. Drive: 5 plays, 25 yards, 0:41.

Third quarter

- UNM – Luke Drzewiecki 40-yard field goal, 10:46. Lobos 34–21. Drive: 7 plays, 50 yards, 2:52.
- UNLV – Var'Keyes Gumms 27-yard pass from Anthony Colandrea (Ramon Villela kick), 8:10. Lobos 34–28. Drive: 6 plays, 75 yards, 2:36.

Fourth quarter

- UNLV – Nick Elksnis 14-yard pass from Anthony Colandrea (Ramon Villela kick), 6:35. Rebels 35–34. Drive: 7 plays, 34 yards, 3:32.
- UNM – D.J. McKinney 13-yard run (pass failed), 2:54. Lobos 40–35. Drive: 8 plays, 75 yards, 3:41.

Statistics	UNM	UNLV
First downs	16	25
Plays–yards	55–532	76–470
Rushes–yards	29–131	29–88
Passing yards	401	382
Passing: Comp–Att–Int	20–26–1	36–47–0
Turnovers	1	3
Time of possession	27:30	32:30

Team	Category	Player	Statistics
New Mexico	Passing	Jack Layne	17/22, 342 yards, 3 TD, INT
New Mexico	Rushing	James Laubstein	8 carries, 99 yards
New Mexico	Receiving	Keagan Johnson	6 receptions, 158 yards, TD
UNLV	Passing	Anthony Colandrea	36/46, 382 yards, 3 TD
UNLV	Rushing	Anthony Colandrea	8 carries, 40 yards
UNLV	Receiving	Daejon Reynolds	5 receptions, 78 yards, TD

=== at Colorado State ===
UNLV Rebels (6–2) at Colorado State Rams (2–6) – Game summary

Quarter	1	2	3	4	Total
Rebels	0	21	14	7	42
Rams	7	3	0	0	10

at Canvas Stadium • Fort Collins, CO

- Date: November 8, 2025
- Game time: 6:30 p.m. PST
- Game attendance: 27,970
- Referee: Patrick Foy
- TV announcers (FS1): Dan Hellie (play-by-play) and Petros Papadakis (analyst)

Game information

First quarter

- CSU – Rocky Beers 3-yard pass from Jackson Brousseau (Isaiah Hankins kick), 9:07. Rams 7–0. Drive: 13 plays, 75 yards, 5:53.

Second quarter

- UNLV – Jai'Den Thomas 57-yard run (Ramon Villela kick), 12:53. Tied 7–7. Drive: 3 plays, 70 yards, 1:20.
- CSU – Isaiah Hankins 23-yard field goal, 9:33. Rams 10–7. Drive: 7 plays, 74 yards, 3:16.
- UNLV – Anthony Colandrea 5-yard run (Ramon Villela kick), 7:07. Rebels 14–10. Drive: 5 plays, 75 yards, 2:26.
- UNLV – Jaylon Glover 6-yard run (Ramon Villela kick), 1:55. Rebels 21–10. Drive: 7 plays, 38 yards, 3:03.

Third quarter

- UNLV – Troy Omeire 68-yard pass from Anthony Colandrea (Ramon Villela kick), 12:22. Rebels 28–10. Drive: 2 plays, 71 yards, 0:43.
- UNLV – Anthony Colandrea 2-yard run (Ramon Villela kick), 3:11. Rebels 35–10. Drive: 7 plays, 91 yards, 3:26.

Fourth quarter

- UNLV – Taeshaun Lyons 39-yard pass from Anthony Colandrea (Ramon Villela kick), 13:36. Rebels 42–10. Drive: 5 plays, 70 yards, 2:56.

Statistics	UNLV	CSU
First downs	23	16
Plays–yards	65–571	63–292
Rushes–yards	41–320	34–103
Passing yards	251	189
Passing: Comp–Att–Int	15–24–1	17–29–1
Turnovers	1	1
Time of possession	33:09	26:51

Team	Category	Player	Statistics
UNLV	Passing	Anthony Colandrea	15/22, 251 yards, 2 TD, INT
UNLV	Rushing	Jai'Den Thomas	7 carries, 131 yards, TD
UNLV	Receiving	Troy Omeire	1 reception, 68 yards, TD
Colorado State	Passing	Jackson Brousseau	13/22, 153 yards, TD
Colorado State	Rushing	Jalen Dupree	13 carries, 56 yards
Colorado State	Receiving	Rocky Beers	4 receptions, 61 yards, TD

=== Utah State ===
Utah State Aggies (5–4) at UNLV Rebels (7–2) – Game summary

Quarter	1	2	3	4	OT	2OT	Total
Aggies	6	7	3	7	0	3	26
Rebels	3	7	7	6	0	6	29

at Allegiant Stadium • Paradise, NV

- Date: November 15, 2025
- Game time: 4:00 p.m. PST
- Game weather: none (indoors)
- Game attendance: 31,682
- Referee: Brad Carrell
- TV announcers (CBSSN): Jordan Kent (play-by-play) and Ben DiNucci (analyst)

Game information

First quarter

- UNLV – Ramon Villela 31-yard field goal, 4:36. Rebels 3–0. Drive: 13 plays, 64 yards, 5:13.
- USU – Brady Boyd 17-yard pass from Bryson Barnes (Tanner Rinker kick failed), 2:21. Aggies 6–3. Drive: 7 plays, 75 yards, 2:15.

Second quarter

- USU – Miles Davis 1-yard run (Tanner Rinker kick), 10:12. Aggies 13–3. Drive: 9 plays, 82 yards, 4:30.
- UNLV – Anthony Colandrea 10-yard run (Ramon Villela kick), 5:27. Aggies 13–10. Drive: 11 plays, 75 yards, 4:45.

Third quarter

- USU – Tanner Rinker 24-yard field goal, 8:40. Aggies 16–10. Drive: 13 plays, 75 yards, 4:59.
- UNLV – Daejon Reynolds 9-yard pass from Anthony Colandrea (Ramon Villela kick), 4:32. Rebels 17–16. Drive: 8 plays, 75 yards, 4:08.

Fourth quarter

- UNLV – Ramon Villela 31-yard field goal, 10:59. Rebels 20–16. Drive: 10 plays, 71 yards, 5:23.
- USU – Bryson Barnes 58-yard run (Tanner Rinker kick), 6:56. Aggies 23–20. Drive: 3 plays, 62 yards, 0:47.
- UNLV – Ramon Villela 32-yard field goal, 2:18. Tied 23–23. Drive: 11 plays, 67 yards, 3:40.

Overtime

- No scoring plays.

Second overtime

- USU – Tanner Rinker 39-yard field goal. Aggies 26–23. Drive: 4 plays, 4 yards.
- UNLV – Kayden McGee 25-yard run. Rebels 29–26. Drive: 1 play, 25 yards.

Statistics	USU	UNLV
First downs	23	27
Plays–yards	74–434	75–422
Rushes–yards	36–178	32–146
Passing yards	256	276
Passing: Comp–Att–Int	19–38–0	24–43–1
Turnovers	0	1
Time of possession	27:45	32:15

Team	Category	Player	Statistics
Utah State	Passing	Bryson Barnes	19/38, 256 yards, TD
Utah State	Rushing	Bryson Barnes	22 carries, 124 yards, TD
Utah State	Receiving	Braden Pegan	8 receptions, 109 yards
UNLV	Passing	Anthony Colandrea	24/43, 276 yards, TD, INT
UNLV	Rushing	Kayden McGee	3 carries, 54 yards, TD
UNLV	Receiving	Troy Omeire	4 receptions, 83 yards

=== Hawaii ===
Hawaii Rainbow Warriors (7–3) at UNLV Rebels (8–2) – Game summary

Quarter	1	2	3	4	Total
Rainbow Warriors	7	3	0	0	10
Rebels	10	14	0	14	38

at Allegiant Stadium • Paradise, NV

- Date: November 21, 2025
- Game time: 7:30 p.m. PST
- Game weather: None (closed roof)
- Game attendance: 37,106
- Referee: Christian Watson
- TV announcers (FS1): Dan Hellie (play-by-play) and Petros Papadakis (analyst)

Game information

First quarter

- UNLV – Ramon Villela 44-yard field goal, 9:28. Rebels 3–0. Drive: 11 plays, 48 yards, 5:32.
- HAW – Jackson Harris 70-yard pass from Micah Alejado (Kansei Matsuzawa kick), 8:16. Rainbow Warriors 7–3. Drive: 3 plays, 75 yards, 1:12.
- UNLV – Jaden Bradley 8-yard pass from Anthony Colandrea (Ramon Villela kick), 3:47. Rebels 10–7. Drive: 8 plays, 75 yards, 4:29.

Second quarter

- UNLV – Taeshaun Lyons 72-yard pass from Anthony Colandrea (Ramon Villela kick), 13:37. Rebels 17–7. Drive: 4 plays, 82 yards, 1:48.
- UNLV – Keyvone Lee 14-yard run (Ramon Villela kick), 5:45. Rebels 24–7. Drive: 13 plays, 60 yards, 5:45.
- HAW – Kansei Matsuzawa 45-yard field goal, 0:05. Rebels 24–10. Drive: 7 plays, 31 yards, 1:55.

Third quarter

- No scoring plays.

Fourth quarter

- UNLV – Daejon Reynolds 1-yard pass from Anthony Colandrea (Ramon Villela kick), 14:55. Rebels 31–10. Drive: 8 plays, 85 yards, 4:13.
- UNLV – JoJo Earle 27-yard run (Ramon Villela kick), 12:49. Rebels 38–10. Drive: 1 play, 27 yards, 0:06.

Statistics	HAW	UNLV
First downs	12	30
Plays–yards	50–231	67–470
Rushes–yards	26–68	41–217
Passing yards	163	253
Passing: Comp–Att–Int	15–24–1	21–26–0
Turnovers	1	1
Time of possession	24:58	35:02

Team	Category	Player	Statistics
Hawaii	Passing	Micah Alejado	15/24, 163 yards, TD, INT
Hawaii	Rushing	Landon Sims	7 carries, 26 yards
Hawaii	Receiving	Jackson Harris	3 receptions, 79 yards, TD
UNLV	Passing	Anthony Colandrea	21/26, 253 yards, 3 TD
UNLV	Rushing	Jai'Den Thomas	13 carries, 61 yards
UNLV	Receiving	Taeshaun Lyons	2 receptions, 75 yards, TD

=== at Nevada (Fremont Cannon) ===
UNLV Rebels (9-2) at Nevada Wolf Pack (3-8) – Game summary

Quarter	1	2	3	4	Total
Rebels	7	21	7	7	42
Wolf Pack	3	0	7	7	17

at Mackay Stadium • Reno, NV

- Date: November 29, 2025
- Game time: 6:00 p.m. PST
- Game attendance: 17,912
- Referee: Patrick Foy
- TV announcers (CBSSN): Jordan Kent (play-by-play), Robert Turbin (analyst) and Jordan Giorgio (sideline)

Game information

First quarter

- UNLV – Jai'Den Thomas 17-yard run (Ramon Villela kick), 11:20. Rebels 7–0. Drive: 7 plays, 75 yards, 3:40.
- NEV – Joe McFadden 40-yard field goal, 1:05. Rebels 7–3. Drive: 9 plays, 36 yards, 5:17.

Second quarter

- UNLV – Troy Omeire 17-yard pass from Anthony Colandrea (Ramon Villela kick), 13:55. Rebels 14–3. Drive: 5 plays, 75 yards, 2:10.
- UNLV – Anthony Colandrea 17-yard run (Ramon Villela kick), 10:55. Rebels 21–3. Drive: 3 plays, 65 yards, 0:38.
- UNLV – Jai'Den Thomas 18-yard run (Ramon Villela kick), 4:09. Rebels 28–3. Drive: 9 plays, 73 yards, 5:15.

Third quarter

- NEV – Caleb Ramseur 17-yard run (Joe McFadden kick), 14:17. Rebels 28–10. Drive: 2 plays, 75 yards, 0:43.
- UNLV – Jai'Den Thomas 4-yard run (Ramon Villela kick), 12:13. Rebels 35–10. Drive: 5 plays, 75 yards, 2:04.

Fourth quarter

- UNLV – Jai'Den Thomas 1-yard run (Ramon Villela kick), 11:35. Rebels 42–10. Drive: 9 plays, 56 yards, 4:52.
- NEV – Caleb Ramseur 3-yard run (Joe McFadden kick), 4:38. Rebels 42–17. Drive: 12 plays, 75 yards, 6:57.

Statistics	UNLV	NEV
First downs	24	23
Plays–yards	55–496	67–341
Rushes–yards	33–226	33–193
Passing yards	270	148
Passing: Comp–Att–Int	15-22-2	23-34–0
Turnovers	2	2
Time of possession	27:09	32:51

Team	Category	Player	Statistics
UNLV	Passing	Anthony Colandrea	15/22, 270 yards, TD, 2 INT
UNLV	Rushing	Jai'Den Thomas	11 carries, 103 yards, 4 TD
UNLV	Receiving	Jaden Bradley	3 receptions, 71 yards
Nevada	Passing	Carter Jones	17/25, 105 yards
Nevada	Rushing	Caleb Ramseur	15 carries, 95 yards, 2 TD
Nevada	Receiving	Jett Carpenter	5 receptions, 56 yards

=== at Boise State (Mountain West Championship Game) ===
2025 Mountain West Championship Game
UNLV Rebels (10–2) at Boise State Broncos (8–4) – Game summary

Quarter	1	2	3	4	Total
Rebels	0	14	7	0	21
Broncos	14	14	0	10	38

at Albertsons Stadium • Boise, ID

- Date: Friday, December 5, 2025
- Game time: 6:00 p.m. MT
- Game weather: Temperature: 43°
- Game attendance: 27,152
- Referee: Patrick Foy
- TV announcers (FOX): Jason Benetti, Robert Griffin III, and Alexa Landestoy

Game information

First quarter

- BOIS – Maddux Madsen 10-yard run (Colton Boomer kick), 6:40. Broncos 7–0. Drive: 5 plays, 51 yards, 2:48.
- BOIS – Dylan Riley 9-yard pass from Maddux Madsen (Colton Boomer kick), 0:18. Broncos 14–0. Drive: 5 plays, 67 yards, 2:17.

Second quarter

- BOIS – Cameron Bates 7-yard pass from Maddux Madsen (Colton Boomer kick), 8:42. Broncos 21–0. Drive: 12 plays, 67 yards, 5:36.
- UNLV – Anthony Colandrea 5-yard run (Ramon Villela kick), 3:08. Broncos 21–7. Drive: 9 plays, 95 yards, 3:46.
- BOIS – Malik Sherrod 39-yard pass from Maddux Madsen (Colton Boomer kick), 1:50. Broncos 28–7. Drive: 3 plays, 5 yards, 1:12.
- UNLV – Troy Omeire 11-yard pass from Anthony Colandrea (Ramon Villela kick), 0:48. Broncos 28–14. Drive: 6 plays, 75 yards, 1:01.

Third quarter

- UNLV – JoJo Earle 7-yard run (Ramon Villela kick), 2:59. Broncos 28–21. Drive: 9 plays, 78 yards, 2:55.

Fourth quarter

- BOIS – Sire Gaines 1-yard run (Colton Boomer kick), 13:21. Broncos 35–21. Drive: 10 plays, 78 yards, 4:31.
- BOIS – Colton Boomer 50-yard field goal, 3:13. Broncos 38–21. Drive: 8 plays, 52 yards, 4:05.

Statistics	UNLV	BOIS
First downs	22	23
Plays–yards	72–409	69–460
Rushes–yards	34–184	38–171
Passing yards	225	289
Passing: Comp–Att–Int	18–38–0	17–31–0
Turnovers	1	0
Time of possession	28:40	31:20

Team	Category	Player	Statistics
UNLV	Passing	Anthony Colandrea	18/38, 225 yards, TD
UNLV	Rushing	Anthony Colandrea	12 carries, 66 yards, TD
UNLV	Receiving	JoJo Earle	2 receptions, 45 yards
Boise State	Passing	Maddux Madsen	17/31, 289 yards, 3 TD
Boise State	Rushing	Dylan Riley	21 carries, 75 yards
Boise State	Receiving	Chase Penry	3 receptions, 96 yards

=== vs. Ohio (Frisco Bowl) ===
2025 Scooter's Coffee Frisco Bowl
UNLV Rebels (10-3) vs Ohio Bobcats (8-4) – Game summary

Quarter	1	2	3	4	Total
Rebels	0	0	3	7	10
Bobcats	0	6	8	3	17

at Ford Center at The Star • Frisco, TX

- Date: December 23, 2025
- Game time: 6:00 p.m. PST
- Game weather: None (played indoors)
- Game attendance: 6,521
- Referee: Tim Rich
- TV announcers (ESPN): Wes Durham (play-by-play), Steve Addazio (analyst) and Dana Boyle (sideline)

Game information

First quarter

- No scoring plays.

Second quarter

- (10:02) OHIO – Parker Navarro 5-yard run (kick failed), 10 plays, 8 yards, 5:57; OHIO 6–0

Third quarter

- (11:04) OHIO – Sieh Bangura 23-yard run (Parker Navarro Pass to Chase Hendricks), 9 plays, 75 yards, 3:56; OHIO 14–0
- (07:33) UNLV – Ramon Villela 50-yard field goal, 4 plays, -2 yards, 0:57; OHIO 14–3

Fourth quarter

- (10:49) OHIO – David Dellenbach 45-yard field goal, 14 plays, 68 yards, 7:47; OHIO 17–3
- (04:45) UNLV – Anthony Colandrea 2-yard run (Ramon Villela kick), 4 plays, -2 yards, 0:57; OHIO 17–10

Statistics	UNLV	OHIO
First downs	18	19
Plays–yards	59–281	58–350
Rushes–yards	29–97	43–207
Passing yards	184	143
Passing: Comp–Att–Int	19–30–1	11–15–1
Turnovers	2	3
Time of possession	28:00	32:00

Team	Category	Player	Statistics
UNLV	Passing	Anthony Colandreo	19/30, 184 yards, INT, 108.2 rating
UNLV	Rushing	Jai'Den Thomas	11 carries, 51 yards
UNLV	Receiving	Jaden Bradley	4 receptions, 62 yards
Ohio	Passing	Parker Navarro	11/15, 143 yards, INT, 140.1 rating
Ohio	Rushing	Sieh Bangura	19 carries, 149 yards, TD
Ohio	Receiving	Chase Hendricks	4 receptions, 87 yards

== Personnel ==
=== Roster ===
2025 UNLV Rebels football team roster
Players
Coaches
Offense

Pos.	#	Name	Class
WR	0	Troy Omeire	Sr
QB	1	Alex Orji	Sr
RB	2	Keyvone Lee	GS
WR	3	Daejon Reynolds	Jr
WR	4	DeAngelo Irvin Jr.	Jr
WR	5	Koy Moore	Sr
WR	6	Jaden Bradley	Sr
QB	7	Cameron Friel	Sr
WR	8	Taeshaun Lyons	So
RB	9	Jai'Den Thomas	Jr
QB	10	Anthony Colandrea	Jr
WR	11	JoJo Earle	Sr
QB	13	Sebastian Circo	Fr
QB	14	Gael Ochoa	Fr
WR	16	Kayden McGee	Fr
WR	19	Danny Boden	Fr
RB	20	Jaylon Glover	Jr
RB	23	Kamran Williams	Fr
RB	24	Darrien Jones	So
TE	30	Var'keyes Gumms	Jr
TE	43	Jae Beasley II	So
TE	52	Jacob Beza	Fr
OL	55	Donavan Manson	Sr
OL	60	Malik McGowan	Sr
OL	61	Graham Keating III	Sr
OL	62	Nick Scalise	Sr
OL	63	Alekai Afoa	So
OL	64	Reid Williams	Sr
OL	65	Alani Makihele	Sr
OL	66	James Faminu	GS
OL	67	Toby Moore	Fr
OL	68	Jayden Ahboah	Sr
OL	70	Maysan Neubauer	Jr
OL	71	Ed Haynes	So
OL	72	Will Thomas	Jr
OL	73	Ace Robinson	Fr
OL	74	Amare Taase	Fr
OL	75	Dyllan Drummond	Fr
OL	76	Chrysanthos Fetokakis	Fr
OL	77	Daniel Hernandez	So
OL	79	Austin Boyd	Jr
WR	80	Isaiah Harris	Fr
WR	82	Rashawn Jackson	So
WR	83	Cassidee Miles	Fr
TE	84	Nick Elksnis	Sr
TE	85	Matt Byrnes	Jr
WR	86	David Titone-Perez	Fr
WR	87	Tavian McNair	Fr
TE	88	Velltray Jefferson	Jr
RB		Mohammad Maali	Jr

Defense

Pos.	#	Name	Class
DB	0	Laterrance Welch	Jr
OLB	1	Chief Borders	Jr
DB	2	Denver Harris	Sr
S	3	Jaheem Joseph	Jr
DB	4	Andrew Powdrell	Jr
DB	5	Quandarius Keyes	Jr
DB	6	Mumu Bin-Wahad	So
DB	7	Jake Pope	Jr
ILB	8	Marsel McDuffie	Sr
DB	9	Aamaris Brown	Sr
DB	10	Tre Fulton	Fr
LB	11	Jordan Eubanks	Jr
S	13	Darrien Stewart	Jr
LB	14	Bryce Edmondson	Sr
LB	15	Blesyng Alualu-Tuiolemotu	So
DL	17	Ose Egbase	GS
DL	18	Landen Thomas	So
DL	19	Mohamed Altayeb	Jr
LB	20	Justin Flowe	Jr
DB	21	Joshua Tuchek	Fr
DB	22	Nijrell Eason II	Fr
DB	23	Jordan Buchanan	Jr
DB	24	Kodi DeCambra	So
DB	25	Jaylen Allen	Fr
DB	26	Devin Hartsuck	Fr
DB	27	Kela Moore	Fr
S	28	Logan Christensen	Fr
DE	30	Tunmise Adeleye	So
DB	31	Yasir Muhammad	Fr
DE	32	Kenji Scanlan	Fr
DB	35	Anthony Costanzo	Jr
LB	37	Trey Wright	Jr
DB	39	Saadite Green Jr.	Sr
DL	40	Armand Ausbon	So
S	41	Brock DeFries	Fr
DE	42	Andre Porter	Fr
DL	44	Waisale Muavesi	Sr
LB	45	Kamuela Ka'aihue	Jr
DL	48	Halatoa Tai	Jr
DL	49	Kal-El Togafau	Fr
LB	50	Melvin Laster	Fr
LB	51	Alexander Green	Fr
DE	53	Cory Hall	Jr
LB	54	Isaiah Patterson	Fr
LB	57	Emeka Megwa	Jr
DL	90	Eliah Logo	Fr
OLB	91	Elias Rudolph	Fr
DL	92	Jalen Lee	GS
DL	93	Maxwell Peterson	So
DL	94	Lucas Conti	So
DL	95	Mo Abbasher	So
DL	96	Jordan Covington	Fr
LB	98	Donovan Spellman	Sr
DL	99	Cohen Fuller	Jr

Special teams

Pos.	#	Name	Class
PK	32	Ramon Villela	So
P	33	Cameron Brown	Fr
PK	34	Andre Meono	Sr
LS	36	Andrew McIlquham	Sr
P	37	Carter Jula	Fr
PK	38	Caden Costa	Sr
P	39	Konner Melzer	Sr
LS	52	Sam Wolfenden	Fr
LS	56	Andrew O'Reilly	Fr

Head coach

- Dan Mullen

Coordinators/assistant coaches

- Paul Guenther – Associate head coach/safeties/interim defensive coordinator
- Corey Dennis – Offensive coordinator/quarterbacks
- Adam Scheier – Special teams coordinator
- Del Alexander – Wide receivers
- Adrian Mayes – Tight ends/run game coordinator
- Quinton Ganther – Running backs
- Mike Sollenne – Offensive line
- Ricky Logo – Defensive line
- Jeremy Bruce – Outside linebackers
- Akeem Davis – Cornerbacks
- Vontaze Burfict – Defensive analyst
- Bam Amina – Graduate assistant - defense
- Kyle Buckner – Graduate assistant - offense

Legend

- (C) Team captain
- (S) Suspended
- (I) Ineligible
- Injured
- Redshirt

Roster
Last update: 7/3/25

=== Transfers ===
==== Outgoing ====
Player	Position	Destination
Anthony Rosas	OL	Abilene Christian
Jacob De Jesus	WR	California
Carver Banker	OL	Campbell
Cooper Haswell	TE	Drake
Marshall Nichols	P	Georgia Tech
Grant Hessler	DL	Idaho State
Shko-Mak Pahmahmie	DL	Indiana State
Matthew Sluka	QB	James Madison
Casey Cain	WR	Liberty
Michael Allen	RB	Marshall
Jalen Catalon	S	Missouri
Matthew Greene	OL	Missouri State
Elijah Wilson	S	Prairie View A&M
Christian Moore	TE	Purdue
Mason Vicari	OL	Purdue
Christian Earls	TE	Purdue
Hank Purvis	OL	Purdue
Jalen St. John	OL	Purdue
Tony Grimes	DB	Purdue
Mani Powell	LB	Purdue
Charles Correa	LB	Purdue
Jett Elad	S	Rutgers
Davis Ambuehl	TE	Sacramento State
Sammy Norris	OL	Sacramento State
Damien McDaniel	WR	Sacramento State
Brennon Scott	LB	Sacramento State
Timothy Conerly	WR	Sacramento State
Keith Conley	DL	Sacramento State
Max Mogelson	DL	St. Thomas
Greg Burrell	RB	Texas State
Jeremiah Vessel	S	UAB
Caden Chittenden	K	USC
Devin Green	RB	Utah
Corey Thompson Jr.	WR	Utah State
Fisher Camac	LB	Virginia
John Lewis	LB	West Virginia
Jack Hasz	OL	Unknown
Landon Rogers	WR	Unknown
Daego Albert	S	Unknown
Mathyus Su'a	OL	Unknown
Alexander Whitmore	DL	Unknown
Kylin James	RB	Unknown
Antonio Doyle	DE	Unknown
Lucas Lenhoff	QB	Unknown
Malik Bradford	WR	Unknown
DeAngelo Irvin Jr.	WR	Unknown
Anton Ambuehl	OT	Unknown
Austin Boyd	OL	Withdrawn
Will Thomas	OL	Withdrawn
Toby Moore	OL	Withdrawn

==== Incoming ====
Player	Position	Previous school
Kamuela Kaaihue	LB	Arizona
Justin Flowe	LB	Arizona
Troy Omeire	WR	Arizona State
Landen Thomas	DL	Arizona State
Laterrance Welch	DB	Arizona State
Var'Keyes Gumms	TE	Arkansas
Darrien Stewart	S	BYU
Donovan Spellman	DE	Charlotte
Reid Williams	OL	Chattanooga
Cohen Fuller	DL	Coastal Carolina
Donavan Manson	OL	Coastal Carolina
Jake Pope	DB	Georgia
Matt Byrnes	TE	Houston
Ben Christman	OL	Kentucky
Jalen Lee	DL	LSU
Caden Costa	K	Memphis
Bryce Edmondson	LB	Memphis
Elias Rudolph	DE	Miami
Alex Orji	QB	Michigan
John Lewis	LB	Mississippi State
Keyvone Lee	RB	Mississippi State
Andrew Powdrell	DB	Montana State
Carter Jula	P	Nevada
Malik McGowan	OL	North Carolina
Cory Hall	DE	Northern Arizona
Emeka Megwa	RB	Oklahoma
Daejon Reynolds	WR	Pittsburgh
Chief Borders	DE	Pittsburgh
Jordan Buchanan	DB	South Alabama
Nick Elksnis	TE	South Carolina
JoJo Earle	WR	TCU
Andrew McIlquham	LS	Temple
James Faminu	OL	Temple
Jordan Buchanan	DB	Tennessee State
Tunmise Adeleye	DE	Texas State
Alani Makihele	OL	UCLA
Isaiah Patterson	LB	UCLA
Aamaris Brown-Bunkley	DB	USF
Jaylon Glover	RB	Utah
Taeshaun Lyons	WR	Utah
Denver Harris	DB	UTSA
Anthony Colandrea	QB	Virginia
Jaheem Joseph	DB	West Virginia
Koy Moore	WR	Western Kentucky
