= Top-down =

Top-down may refer to:

- Top-down camera, a still- or video camera pointed down in a vertical line perpendicular to the subject
  - Multiplane camera, in 2D animation creation

== Arts and entertainment ==
- "Top Down", a 2007 song by Swizz Beatz
- "Top Down", a song by Lil Yachty from Lil Boat 3
- "Top Down", a song by Fifth Harmony from Reflection
- "Topdown", a song by Channel Tres from the Channel Tres EP

== Science ==
- Top-down reading, is a part of reading science that explains the reader's psycholinguistic strategies in using grammatical and lexical knowledge for comprehension rather than linearly decoding texts.
- Top-down proteomics, a method for protein analysis
- Top-down effects, effects of population density on a resource in a soil food web
- Neural top–down control of physiology
- Top-down processing, in Pattern recognition (psychology)

== Computing ==
- Top-down and bottom-up design of information ordering
- Top-down parsing, a parsing strategy beginning at the highest level of the parse tree
  - Top-down parsing language, an analytic formal grammar to study top-down parsers
- Top-down perspective, a camera angle in computer and video games
- Top-down shooter, a subgenre of video games

== Investing ==
- Top-down investment analysis, an investment selection technique that evaluates macro factors (e.g., economy and industry) before micro factors (e.g., specific company)

== See also ==
- Horizontal and vertical writing in East Asian scripts, including writing in columns going from top to bottom and ordered from right to left
- Bottom-up (disambiguation)
