= SugarCrash! =

2020 single by ElyOtto

Single by ElyOtto
- Released: August 25, 2020
- Genre: Hyperpop
- Length: 1:20; 2:32 (remix)
- Songwriter: Elliott Platt
- Producer: Elliott Platt

ElyOtto singles chronology
"Lost" (2017)	"SugarCrash!" (2020)	"Let Go :(" (2020)

Music video
- "SugarCrash!" on YouTube

"SugarCrash!" is a song written, produced, and performed by Canadian musician ElyOtto. It was released on August 25, 2020. The song went viral on the video-sharing app TikTok in February 2021. A remix featuring German singer Kim Petras and Canadian-American musician Curtis Waters was released on April 23, 2021. By December 2021, the song had become, at the time, the fourth most used TikTok audio in the platform's history.

== Background and composition ==
On August 26, 2020, ElyOtto uploaded "Sugarcrash!," a hyperpop song inspired by 100 gecs, to his SoundCloud.

On August 27, 2020, ElyOtto uploaded a TikTok video promoting the song that received over 760,000 views and 204,000 likes in seven months.

"SugarCrash!" incorporates hyperpop with many sound effects, distorted bass, and high-pitched vocals, consisting of two choruses, a verse, and a bridge. Platt claimed in a Genius interview that the song, made with GarageBand, was a soundfont test for Pokémon Black and White. Platt also stated that the song covered many of his issues: how tired he was of the ongoing COVID-19 pandemic, his future, and his gender dysphoria.

I've heard a lot of trans people say that they feel like they're born in the wrong body, wishing they could be someone else. I don't feel like that at all, I'm who I meant to be. I want to get rid of that self-hatred I have for myself, and sort of become accepting. It's such a personal thing to me, but taken out of context, it's something that pretty much anyone could relate to, which I think is really beautiful.

== Critical reception ==
Vulture's Justin Curto wrote: "As a song, 'SugarCrash!' tries to solve the very problem it's about. It's nothing new in hyperpop, which often uses buoyant productions to address darker themes. But on another, equally self-aware level, the song works so well because it's also about exactly what it sounds like. It's a hyperactive song about being full of pent-up energy; a brain-splitting song that, at one point, contemplates splitting one's own brain". The song also received praise from Billboard author Joe Lynch, who described it as "a diaristic, candy-coated slice of teenage dissatisfaction."

Due to the success of "SugarCrash!", Spin magazine labeled ElyOtto "the new face of hyperpop".

Following the song's success, at least seven record labels reached out to ElyOtto before he signed to RCA Records.

== Charts ==
"SugarCrash!" debuted at number 30 on the Hot Rock & Alternative Songs chart, having spent 19 weeks-and-counting on the chart in total, peaking at number 10. It later debuted at number 23 on the Bubbling Under Hot 100 for the week of March 20, 2021, and peaked at number 59 on the UK Singles Chart, as well as number 126 on Billboard's Global 200. The song also earned ElyOtto a spot on Rolling Stone's Breakthrough 25 chart for the months of February and March 2021 at numbers 15 and 17, respectively, as well as a spot on Billboard's Emerging Artists chart for four weeks, peaking at number 36.

=== Weekly charts ===
Weekly chart performance for "SugarCrash!"
Chart (2021)	Peak position
Austria (Ö3 Austria Top 40)	53
Canada (Canadian Hot 100)	81
Czech Republic Singles Digital (ČNS IFPI)	16
Global 200 (Billboard)	126
Ireland (IRMA)	62
Lithuania (AGATA)	30
Netherlands (Single Tip)	10
Slovakia Singles Digital (ČNS IFPI)	19
Sweden Heatseeker (Sverigetopplistan)	3
UK Singles (OCC)	59
UK Indie (OCC)	11
US Bubbling Under Hot 100 Singles (Billboard)	23
US Hot Rock & Alternative Songs (Billboard)	10

=== Year-end charts ===
Year-end chart performance for "SugarCrash!"
Chart (2021)	Position
US Hot Rock & Alternative Songs (Billboard)	48

== Certifications ==
Certifications for "SugarCrash!"
Region	Certification	Certified units/sales
Canada (Music Canada)	Gold	40,000^{‡}
Poland (ZPAV)	Gold	25,000^{‡}
^{‡} Sales+streaming figures based on certification alone.
