= Curtis Waters =

Canadian-American musician (born 1999)

- Born: Abhinav Bastakoti; December 20, 1999 (age 26); Kathmandu, Nepal
- Origin: Cary, North Carolina, U.S.
- Genres: Pop, indie pop, alt pop
- Occupations: Musician, rapper, singer, songwriter
- Label: BMG

Abhinav Bastakoti (born December 20, 1999), known by his stage name Curtis Waters, is a Canadian-American musician, rapper, singer and songwriter. He is known for his 2020 debut single "Stunnin'". He is the first Nepal-born musician to attain international success.

== Early life ==
Abhinav Bastakoti was born on December 20, 1999, in Kathmandu, Nepal. At a young age, he moved to India, before moving to Germany at the age of 4, then Calgary, Canada at the age of 10. At the age of 14, Bastakoti returned to Nepal for three months to receive his Bratabanda, a Hindu coming of age ceremony. Around this time he downloaded FL Studio onto his laptop and started making beats. Posting them online in 2017 as Frank Waters, before changing it to Curtis Waters, a homage to his two favourite artists Joy Division’s Ian Curtis and Frank Ocean. As a teenager attending Sir Winston Churchill High School he struggled with depression and used music and graphic design to overcome it. He would often skip school to compete in beat battles. In 2017, he moved to Cary, North Carolina, as a result of his parents' educational pursuits. He then enrolled in the University of North Carolina at Greensboro.

== Career ==
In April 2020, Waters posted a 15-second snippet of his pop rap song, "Stunnin'" which went viral on TikTok. In one month, "Stunnin'" was viewed more than two million times on YouTube. In June, "Stunnin'" was ranked #3 on Rolling Stone's Breakthrough 25 Chart. By July 2020, "Stunnin'" had been streamed over 35 million times on Spotify.

Waters was approached by numerous labels. He decided to stay independent, but did sign a licensing deal with BMG. He also signed a management deal with Chris Anokute.

In June 2020, Rolling Stone magazine ran an article about Waters. In July 2020, "Stunnin'" was used in a Mercedes-Benz commercial.

Water's second single was "System." He recorded his debut album, Pity Party, in his dorm at UNC Greensboro. The album was commercially released in October 2020. One reviewer of Pity Party noted, "The throughline in these 12 disparate tracks remains Waters’ distinct point of view, simultaneously self-deprecating, sincere, and disarmingly honest." On June 23, 2023, he released his sophomore album, Bad Son.

== Artistry ==
His musical influences include Frank Ocean, Kanye West, Odd Future, Tyler the Creator, and Joy Division’s Ian Curtis.

== Personal life ==
Bastakoti lives in Los Angeles, California. He has been open about his experience with depression and bipolar disorder and has expressed his desire to be a mental health advocate in Nepal.

== Discography ==
=== Studio albums ===
Title	Album details
Pity Party	Released: October 9, 2020; Label: BMG; Formats: Digital download, streaming
Bad Son	Released: June 23, 2023; Label: Guin Records; Formats: Digital download, streaming

=== Singles ===
Title	Year	Peak chart positions					Certifications	Album
Title	Year	CAN	IRE	NZ Hot	UK	US Bub.	Certifications	Album
"Stunnin'" (featuring Harm Franklin)	2020	36	27	21	69	11	PMB: Platinum; MC: 2× Platinum; RIAA: Gold	Pity Party
"System"	2020	—	—	—	—	—		Pity Party
"The Feelings Tend to Stay the Same"	2020	—	—	—	—	—		Pity Party
"Freckles"	2020	—	—	—	—	—		Pity Party
"Doodoodoo"	2021	—	—	—	—	—		Non-album singles
"Conceited"	2021	—	—	—	—	—		Non-album singles
"Plastic World"	2021	—	—	—	—	—		Non-album singles
"Manic Man"	2022	—	—	—	—	—		Bad Son
"Star Killer"	2022	—	—	—	—	—		Bad Son
"Riot" (featuring Chlothegod)	2022	—	—	—	—	—		Bad Son
"Himbo" / "God's Lonely Man"	2023	—	—	—	—	—		Bad Son
"Death Keeps Calling My Name" (featuring Shrimp)	2023	—	—	—	—	—		Bad Son
"—" denotes a recording that did not chart or was not released in that territory.

=== Featured singles ===
- 2019: "Food Court Heart Break" (33 Life featuring Curtis Waters and Yung Star Ballout)
- 2020: "Quarantine Party" (Jay2thekim featuring Curtis Waters)
- 2020: "Sensual Healing" (Susanne Davis featuring Asher Porter and Curtis Waters)
- 2021: "SugarCrash!" (ElyOtto featuring Kim Petras and Curtis Waters)
