= Scooter's Coffee =

American coffee shop chain

- Scooter's Coffee logo

- Location in Sweetwater, Tennessee
- Type: Private
- Industry: Coffee shop
- Founded: 1998; 28 years ago, in Bellevue, Nebraska, U.S.
- Founders: Don and Linda Eckles
- Headquarters: Omaha, Nebraska, United States
- Number of locations: 920 (2026)
- Area served: 32 states
- Key people: Joe Thornton (CEO); John Owen (COO)
- Website: www.scooterscoffee.com

Scooter's Coffee is an American drive-through coffeehouse chain founded in Bellevue, Nebraska and headquartered in Omaha, Nebraska. As of August 2026, the chain had 920 franchises in 32 states, as of June 2024, the chain was the second-largest drive-through coffee chain and the fifth-largest coffee chain in the United States.

== Overview ==
Scooter's Coffee uses a franchise model to establish new stores. Some locations are drive-through only and do not have sit-in dining areas. The buildings are standardized and measure 664 square feet (61.7 m^{2}). Its coffee is produced by Harvest Roasting, which was founded alongside Scooter's Coffee.

The menu includes hot, blended, and cold drinks, including coffee, tea, and smoothies; and food items, such as pastries, burritos, and sandwiches. It also has a kids drink menu. Scooters signature drink is the Caramelicious, an espresso drink with caramel sauce and whipped cream. Scooters introduced the ‘Licious lineup on Thursday, February 19, 2026. The lineup features the Caramelicous, Fudgelicous, Cinnalicous, Turtle, Sea Salt Carmelicous, Honeycomb, and Strawberry Shortcake.

== History ==
Scooter's Coffee was founded in 1998 in Bellevue, Nebraska, by Don and Linda Eckles. In November 2023, Joe Thornton was named the new chief executive officer. John Owen, a former executive for McDonald's and Subway, was named chief operating officer in January 2024.

Scooter's announced its goal to reach 1,000 stores by the end of 2024 and began rapidly expanding in 2021. Between August 2021 and 2022, its store count increased by 25%. By December 2022, it had 500 stores, and by October 2023, it had established its 700th store. A 750th store opened in December 2023. In June 2024, after opening its 800th store six months behind schedule, Scooter's Coffee retracted its 1,000-store goal by the end of 2024.

In February 2024, Scooter's Coffee built its sixth distribution center, a 183,000-square-foot (17,000 m^{2}) facility in Whitestown, Indiana, to support 300 stores across the Midwest United States.

== Locations ==
As of August 2026, the chain had 920 locations in 32 states, making it the second-largest drive-through coffee chain in the United States, behind Dutch Bros. Coffee.

== Promotional activity ==
Since 2023, Scooter's Coffee has sponsored the Frisco Bowl, an annual National Collegiate Athletic Association (NCAA) sanctioned post-season Division I Football Bowl Subdivision (FBS) college football bowl game played in Frisco, Texas.
