= White Cloud Farms Pottery =

20th-century American ceramics studio

White Cloud Farms Pottery, also referred to as White Cloud Pottery, was a 20th-century American ceramics studio (1924–1957) located in Rock Tavern, New York, Orange County, some 65 miles north of Manhattan.

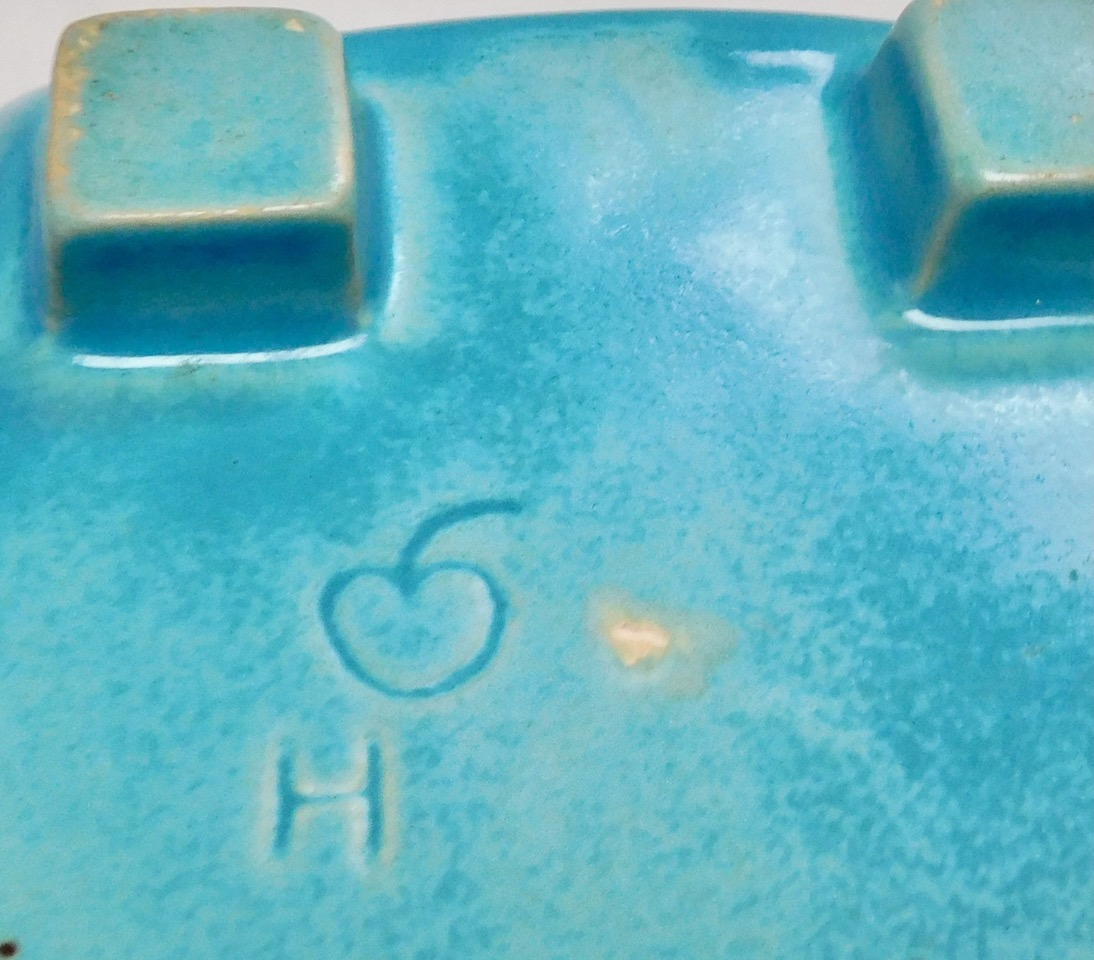
White Cloud Farms Pottery mark: incised apple. Here an "H" is added as a signature of Holland Robert Bacher. (1930s)

The pottery and tile production was one part of the Bacher family's White Cloud Farms business which also produced apples, poultry, and livestock. The pottery business manufactured decorative American art pottery and tiles, marketed nationally by wholesalers in New York City, by art galleries, and locally at the farm's studio. Two articles and a website provide most information about the Bacher family and their ceramics venture. The writer of these articles, researcher and collector Stephen Visakay, was answering the 1988 challenge of pottery marks expert Lois Lehner to find information on White Cloud Farms pottery: "I would give a great deal to have the whole story. Information was very scarce."

== History ==
Manhattan academic artist Otto Henry Bacher (1856–1909), married to former art student Mary Holland (1868–1950) of Cleveland, Ohio, moved in 1895 to Lawrence Park, an art colony in Bronxville, NY, now designated the Lawrence Park Historic District. They had four sons: Holland Robert (1890–1958), Otto Devereux (1892–1943), Eugene David (1893–1981) and Will Low Bacher (1898–1982).

=== Establishing White Cloud Farm Inc. ===
Eight years after Otto Henry Bacher's death in 1909, Mary Bacher and her sons moved to the 125-acre farm she had purchased in Rock Tavern, New York. The working farm came with planted produce, horses, cows, pigs, and chickens. Their new name, White Cloud Farm, signaled their optimism and new beginnings. The four boys worked there and continued their education. Robert (Bob) Bacher graduated from University of Illinois with a degree in ceramic engineering, along with Eugene Bacher who got a degree in agriculture. Otto Devereaux Bacher studied theater in New York while Will Low Bacher studied art in New York's National Academy of Design, and then in Rome and Paris.

In 1927 Robert Bacher incorporated and trademarked separately both the farm and the art pottery as White Cloud Farms, Incorporated, adding an “s” to Farm. The new White Cloud Farms brand would encompass all divisions of the operation: apples, poultry, eggs, pottery and tile. Three family members ran the businesses. The brothers Eugene and Otto Devereaux oversaw operations at the apple orchard, now 65 acres, and the poultry/egg farm of 2,500 chickens. Bob Bacher, the trained ceramic engineer, established the White Cloud Farm pottery studio in 1924 in a renovated chicken barn and was joined by brother Will Low who designed shapes and decorations.

=== Establishing White Cloud Farms Pottery ===
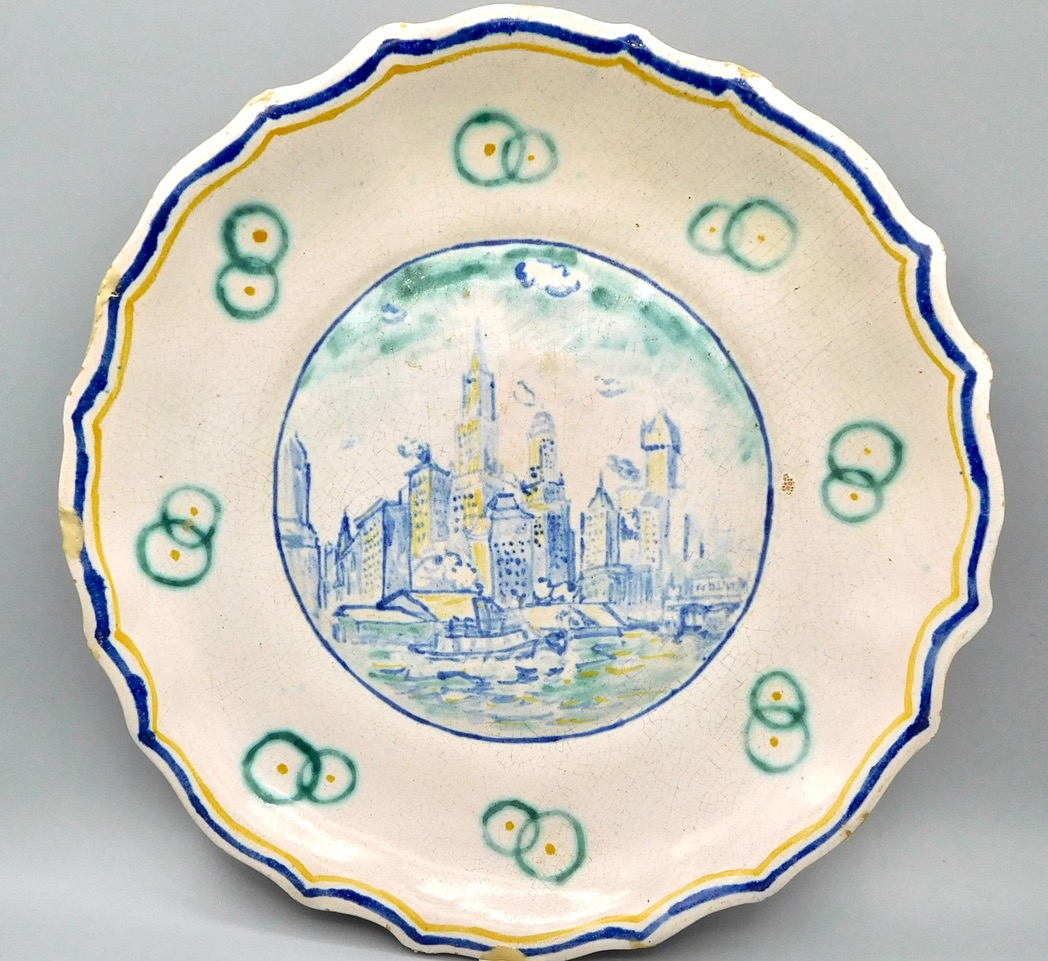
White Cloud Farms Pottery: Plate depicting NYC cityscape. handpainted. (1930s)

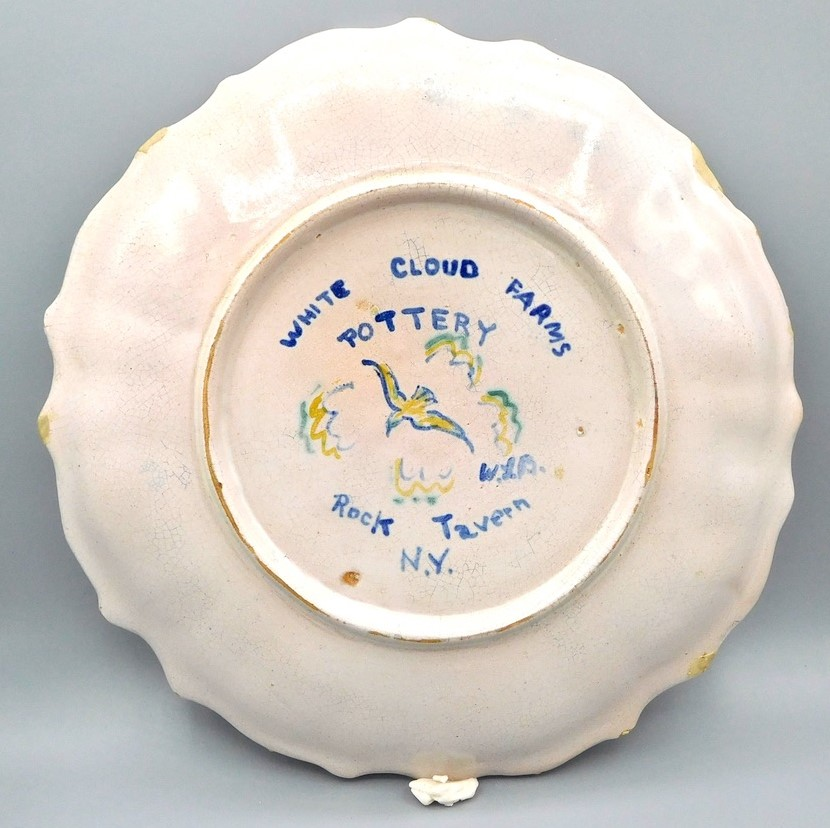
White Cloud Farms Pottery: Painted inscription on back of late depicting NYC cityscape. handpainted. (1930s)

In the 1924–1927 start-up period, Robert Bacher used his ceramics engineering to develop several clay-body and glaze formulations until he hit on the White Cloud Farms pottery we know. Initially his casting clay used ball-clay. Dissatisfied, he stopped production and changed the slipcasting formula to contain china clay (kaolin) requiring high-firing temperatures, 2,200-2,400 degree F, resulting in a tougher ware. (true porcelain requires 2,650 degrees Fahrenheit (1,454 degrees Celsius) while the Bacher's slightly lower temperature range produces a ware called “china”.

Then he formulated glazes which also fired at the clay-body's high temperature: range. By 1927 Bacher had arrived at a porcelain-like product using an economical single-firing of glaze and greenware simultaneously, achieving a “glaze fit,” avoiding crackle, creep, bubbling and so on. This high temperature ruled out toxic lead-glazes and underglaze decorative techniques.

Robert built his oil-fired kilns and formulated his clay-bodies and glazes. Will Low designed the pottery shapes and decorations. Helene Ayres Bacher, Robert's wife, and others would paint the designs following dotted outlines transferred with perforated templates using pouncing. The pottery had two or three employees at any given time.

Identifying marks are found on the bases of White Cloud Farms wares. Some are incised with the apple-with-stem. Others have White Cloud Farms legends hand-painted in glaze. Smallish paper labels, rarely preserved, show farmland, trees and a large white cloud on a black background.

== "Bottoms Up" Shot Cup ==
Of the hundreds of designs produced by White Cloud Farms pottery, their risqué ceramic Bottoms Up shot cup depicting the naked flapper is today their best-known collectible design. Initiated during Prohibition, these cups have been imitated over the decades, in glass. Lacking a base, the cup rests upside-down on its rim when not in use, its rounded bottom up. The naked girl is draped over the bottom of the upended drinking cup, arms and legs spread wide, her bottom up.

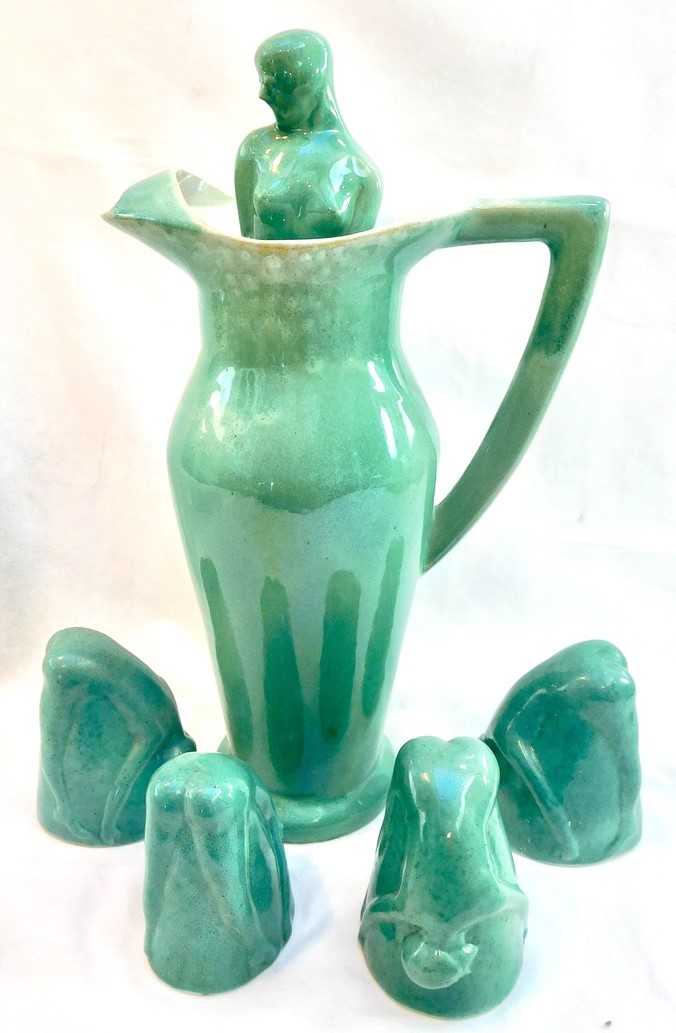
White Cloud Farms Pottery: ceramic "Bottoms Up" cocktail set. (ca.1935) Martini pitcher with stopper, four Bottoms Up shot cups.

The cup seems inspired by the classic toast, Bottoms Up! Others claim this very shot cup inspired the toast because, once filled, the drink needs to be knocked back since, lacking a base, it can't be put back down.

Will Low Bacher filed his original design for the White Cloud Farms Bottoms Up Shot Glass on August 23, 1928. The final patent, serial number 27,939, was granted to Bacher and White Cloud Farms on February 19, 1929, for a term of 14 years. Also that February, they were granted trademark for the name, “Bottoms Up,” which applied to earthenware drinking cups in Class 30 Crockery. Pirated glass copies appeared, made in various colors by McKee Glass Company in Jeannette, Pennsylvania.

Bacher and White Cloud Farms sued McKee for patent infringement. In the out-of-court settlement, McKee 'leased' or purchased the Bottoms Up Shot Glass design patent from Bacher to allow for mass production of the design in glass. Then McKee changed the original suggestive open-leg design to the relatively sedate design with closed legs. White Cloud Farms seems to have retained the rights to manufacture the Bottoms Up cup and would depict the naked flapper in two versions: legs closed and legs spread.

White Cloud Farms pottery also produced a Bottoms Up martini pitcher until the late 1930s. It was cylindrical and its lid was in the form of the top half of the naked flapper.

The McKee Glass Company went out of business in 1951. In the 1970s, the Summit Art Glass Company, Akron and Ravenna, Ohio, bought the McKee glass molds and put Bottoms Up shotglasses in production omitting the patent numbers in original molds.

== Tiles ==
White Cloud Farm Pottery tiles and their production have been described in detail. They were also slipcast and produced using a high-kaolin slip. Once the greenware tiles were glazed with designs, they were single-fired at high temperature, 2200–2400 degrees F, achieving a porcelain-like ware.

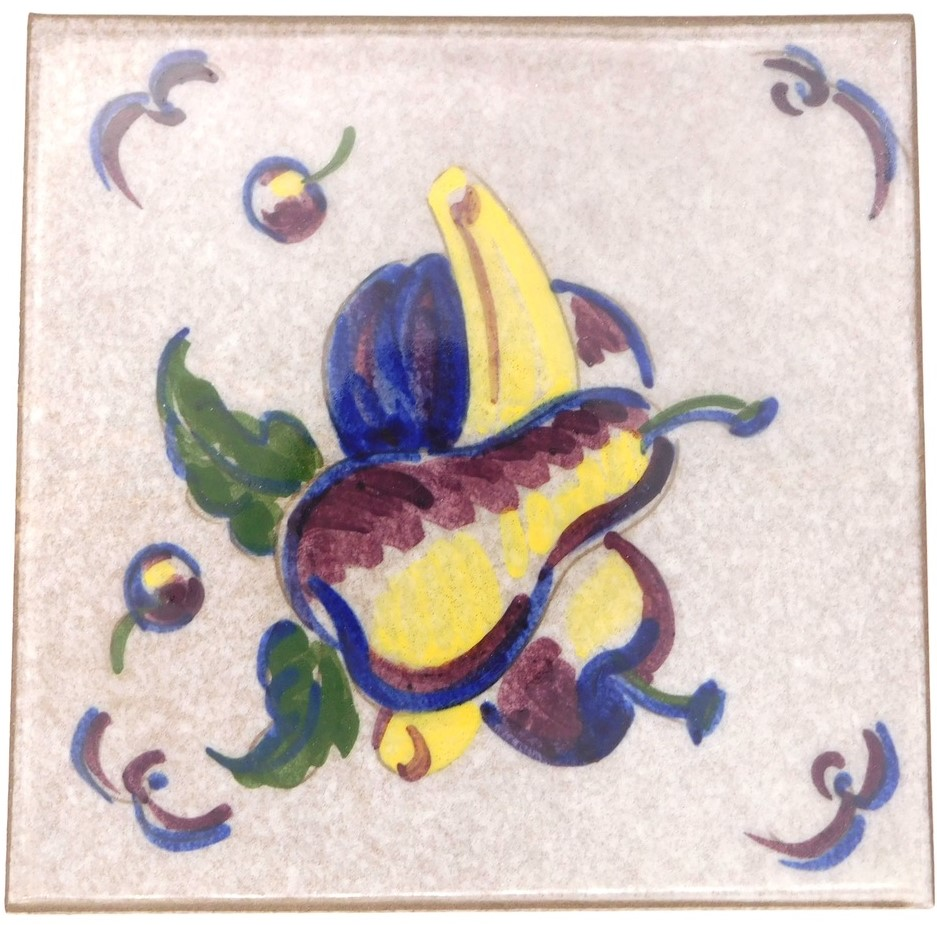
Ceramic Tile by White Cloud Farms Pottery. 6x6 in, no date.

Vanderlaan Tile Company, Park Avenue, New York, featured White Cloud tile lines in its two known illustrated sales catalogs of the 1950s.

They gave examples of the use of White Cloud Faience tile in New York City architecture: Parke-Bernet Galleries had turquoise tiled reflection pools in its landscaped roof on Madison Avenue; the Antique gold tile stripes in the façade of Blackton Ltd. on Fifth Avenue and 57th Street; the underglaze roses on the tile façade of Hunter Shops, opposite Blackton Ltd. Mosaic tiles by White Cloud were used for underground street signs in the New York subways.

== Marketing ==
The wares were compared to porcelain. For example, a New Yorker magazine writer described White Cloud pottery sold at Cauman Gallery, midtown Manhattan, in 1940: “…Enamel-like White Cloud pottery, so fine its almost porcelain, is glazed in topaz, celadon, Chinese oxblood and deep, gold-sprinkled lapis blue…”

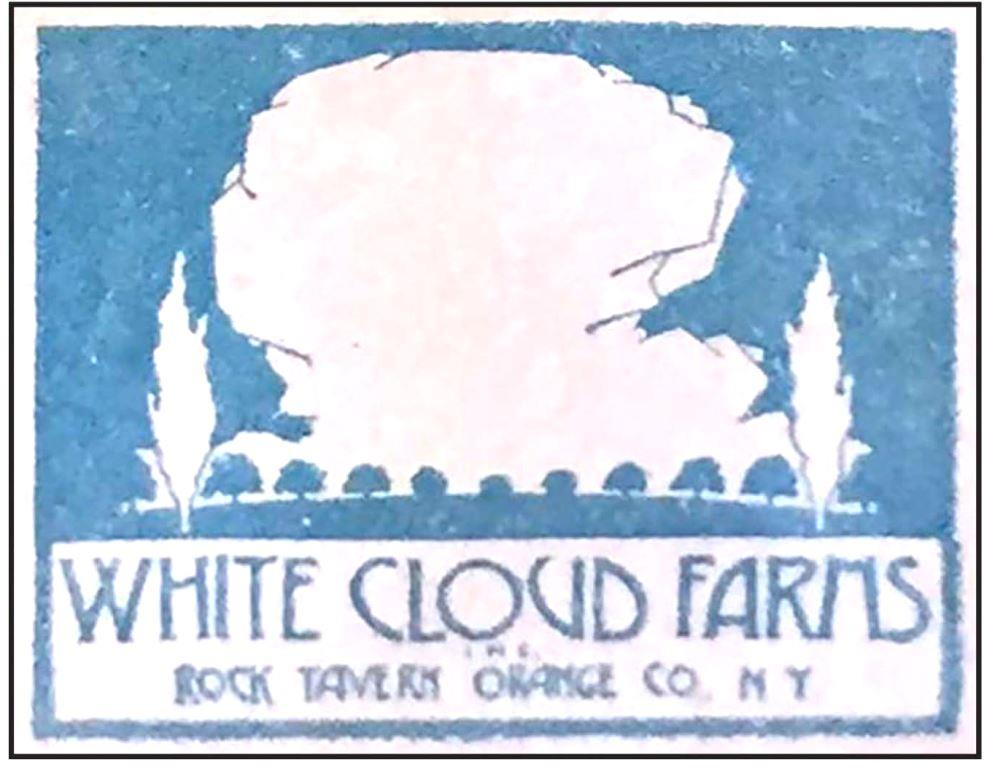
White Cloud Farms logo on a paper stamp 1-1/16 x 1 1/8 in affixed to bases of White Cloud Farms Pottery wares.

Documentation of the Bachers’ pottery wares and their merchandising is found in two 1933 publications by Permanent Exhibition of Arts & Crafts, Inc., known also as P.E.D.A.C. or PEDAC. This influential decorators’ gallery was their Manhattan wholesaler and retailer of the 1930s. PEDAC and its clients were widely publicized and the gallery took up the entire 10th floor of Rockefeller Center.

Their 15-page exhibition catalog, a booklet entitled P.E.D.A.C, described each exhibitor and included a photograph of the exhibit. White Cloud Farms Pottery is shortened to “White Cloud Pottery.”

Each exhibitor had a supply of additional PEDAC brochures both for their own use and for PEDAC salespeople. The Bachers’ brochure was entitled “White Cloud: Ceramic & Sculpture,” and printed with a catalog of line drawings, “Some Designs and Prices,” of 37 utilitarian and decorative ceramics, giving apparent retail prices as FOB Rock Tavern, NY. The PEDAC showrooms were constantly reconfigured to show to the public and to decorators their exhibitors’ products in decorated rooms, table settings. [The New York Times] and other publications publicized PEDAC showings regularly along with gallery exhibitions.

By the late 1930s, PEDAC wound down and the Bachers looked to other sales venues. A "New Yorker" article of 1940 described a White Cloud Pottery platter at Rebecca Cauman's highly regarded crafts gallery at 14 East 50th Street. Yearly the Bachers exhibited White Cloud Farm Pottery and agricultural products at the Orange County Fair (New York), Middletown, NY. Local newspapers would proudly cover this singular family enterprise.

Starting in the 1930s, New York tile wholesaler Vanderlaan Tile Company, located on Park Avenue merchandized White Cloud Farms Pottery's tiles and sold to the trade. Following World War I, Vanderlaan specialized in imported Dutch tiles and, in the 1930s, Charles Vanderlaan, the son, branched out to also represent certain New York-based art tile companies, namely White Cloud Farms, Soriano Ceramics, and Designed Tiles. Vanderlaan marketed them as “White Cloud Faience Tile,” implying their impermeability to water. These were not tin-glazed majolica or faience, rather more of a porcelain, according to the Vanderlaan Tile catalog.

The Vanderlaan Tile Company's illustrated catalogs offered decorated tiles in five series of 12 designs each: Rock Tavern, Pennsylvania Dutch, Dutch Colonial, Dutch Colonial Ships, American Historical. As well there was a Sailing Vessels series of 20 designs.

== Closure ==
The small pottery company, successful from its start in the 1920s, would stay busy for the next few decades until its closing in 1957. The pottery building at White Cloud Farms was rebuilt by 1947, having burned to the ground in 1945. Like many pottery structures of the time, the timbers became dried from the intense heat of a burning kiln and were easily combustible. It was rebuilt from cinder blocks, 40 ft × 80 ft with three large oil-burning kilns.

White Cloud Farms leased out the orchards in 1954 and the pottery ceased operations in 1957. Founder Robert Bacher died on August 7, 1958. It is unknown what became of the White Cloud Farm Pottery records.

In 1965, ceramist Ron Burke (1936–2016) purchased the pottery and contents on 1.04 acres of land from Will Low Bacher. Burke and wife Tess renamed the ceramic enterprise Rock Tavern Pottery. They created and sold wheel-thrown pottery and tile, mostly stoneware. By 1967 they had traded the White Cloud slipmolds to a ceramics hobby shop in nearby Montgomery, NY, in exchange for a new electric kiln.

When in 1973 the State of New York bought Burke's land through eminent domain for the proposed Stewart International Airport expansion, they moved their pottery to a farm in Shapleigh, Maine, retiring the name Rock Tavern Pottery.

The state government used its eminent domain powers to take 7,500 acres (30 km^{2}) for terminals, runways and a buffer zone expanding the airport from Newburgh into neighboring towns of Montgomery, Hamptonburgh, New Windsor, and Rock Tavern. While the Stewart International Airport proposal never came to fruition, partly owing to the 1970s fuel crisis, the Bacher legacy was displaced along with three hundred and thirty-seven families. Today there is not a trace of White Cloud Farm or the large family homestead to be found, all subsumed by the 6,700 acre Stewart State Forest.

== Bibliography ==
- Permanent Exhibition of Decorative Arts & Crafts, Inc. Rockefeller Center, New York: P.E.D.A.C. 1933. p. 15
- Vanderlaan Tile Company (1952). Tile and Faience. New York: Vanderlaan Tile Co.
- Visakay, Steven (July 28, 2004). "Risqué Business: Naughty Pottery Was Keystone of White Cloud Farms' Deco Wares". Antique Trader. 1, 28
- Visakay, Steven (July 2006). "The Curious Story of the Most Famous Unknown Pottery Company in America: White Cloud Farms, Inc., Rock Tavern, New York," Journal of the American Art Pottery Association. Vol.22 No.4, pp. 7–12.
- Visakay, Stephen (Spring 2021). "White Cloud Faience Tile: 1924–1958". Tile Heritage Vol. XI No.1, pp. 9–18.
- "White Cloud Farms Pottery, Rock Tavern, New York." www.Facebook.com/WhiteCloudFarmsPotteryRockTavernNewYork/
