= U Was at the Club (Bottoms Up) =

2019 single by The Boyboy West Coast

Single by The Boyboy West Coast
- Released: April 19, 2019
- Recorded: 2018
- Genre: Pop rap
- Length: 3:16
- Label: Republic
- Songwriters: Manuel Ramirez; Matthew Miller
- Producer: Lil Medic

The Boyboy West Coast singles chronology
| "U Was at the Club (Bottoms Up)" (2019) | "Just Like That" (2019) |

Music video
- "U Was at the Club (Bottoms Up)" on YouTube

"U Was at the Club (Bottoms Up)" is a song by American rapper The Boyboy West Coast. First previewed in September 2018, it went viral in early 2019 via the video-sharing app TikTok, followed by its release on April 19, 2019 as his debut single.

== Background ==
In an interview with Genius, the Boyboy West Coast said the song was about a girl he met at a nightclub, adding "I took little parts about her and fuckin' added em' into the verses and just came out like that." As for how it came about, he said:

Once I heard the beat, that shit was already. Some songs, they take some time to map it out. But as soon as the beat drop, I just already knew where to go with it. I hit the studio that day. I was originally trying to sing the whole thing, then my engineer told me to lace it up. My boy JG told me to, you know, break it down. Sing the first part and then jump into rapping. I had to balance it out. I guess in the moment, the girl had me in a singing mood or some shit. But you know, my engineer always helps me out. We evened it out. Then we literally recorded that song over a year ago back when it was just another studio session, too. When we did laced up the two, we did both verses one day. When we did it, we never expected it to be what it was. It was just one songs out of many. It wasn't even supposed to be any main song on the album either. But everyone seemed to love what it was and from there it just took off.

The instrumental of the song was produced by Lil Medic and originally titled "Feelin' Free - Happy Pop Beat".

== Composition ==
The song sees the Boyboy West Coast singing about finding a girl in the club whom he falls in love with, rapping in staccato and in AutoTune vocals reminiscent of pop rap songs in the late 2000s, over looping guitar chords.

== Release and promotion ==
The song was first revealed in a snippet posted on Instagram on September 2, 2018, in which the Boyboy West Coast lip syncs the first verse of the then-unnamed song as it is playing in the background, while dressed in black, wearing jewelry, sunglasses on his head, and a bandana around his neck and also pretending to drink lean from a styrofoam cup. In January 2019, the song had risen in popularity through its use in many TikTok videos and memes which further helped the Boyboy West Coast gain widespread recognition. He previewed the second verse of the song in another Instagram snippet on February 15, 2019 and later explained the lyrics of the song on Genius on March 27, 2019. Among those who praised the song were Diplo and Charlie Puth. In March 2019, a remix of the song featuring Canadian artist Ramriddlz also leaked online and became a minor hit. Eventually, the song was officially released to streaming services on April 19, 2019.

The song's rise to popularity has been compared to that of "Old Town Road" by Lil Nas X, which also propelled to fame through TikTok around the same time frame.

== Critical reception ==
Meaghan Garvey of The Fader wrote of the BoyBoy West Coast's performance, "All of this is impossibly charming. There is nothing on The Boyboy West Coast's sole mixtape — last year's Playboy Gangsta, available exclusively on SoundCloud — that sounds much like 'Bottoms Up.' It's more of a grab bag of vaguely West coast trends of the 2010s with a random Tory Lanez verse thrown in for good measure, but it's honestly not bad." Charles Holmes of Rolling Stone stated "The track itself was a fascinating facsimile of modern rap's physical and sonic aesthetics — essentially a child's version of a Pitbull song — acted out by a man with intensely groomed facial hair. His voice was a comically low growl left to marinate in AutoTune overnight" and "As a piece of art, it was hard to objectively judge; to call it good would be an understatement."

== Music video ==
An official music video for the song was released on May 21, 2019.
