= Tropical Smoothie Cafe =

American smoothie chain

Tropical Smoothie Cafe, LLC
- Trade name: Tropical Smoothie Café
- Type: Private
- Industry: Restaurant
- Genre: Fast casual
- Founded: 1993 in Destin, Florida, U.S.
- Founders: Eric Jenrich; Delora Jenrich; David Walker
- Headquarters: Atlanta, Georgia, U.S.
- Number of locations: 1,750+ (2026)
- Area served: United States
- Key people: Max Wetzel (CEO)
- Products: Smoothies; sandwiches; wraps; flat breads; bowls
- Owner: Blackstone
- Website: tropicalsmoothiecafe.com

Tropical Smoothie Cafe, also referred to as Tropical Smoothie, is a restaurant franchise in the United States. It operates more than 1,750 locations nationwide.

On June 10, 2024, Blackstone announced that equity funds it manages completed the acquisition of the franchisor.

== History ==
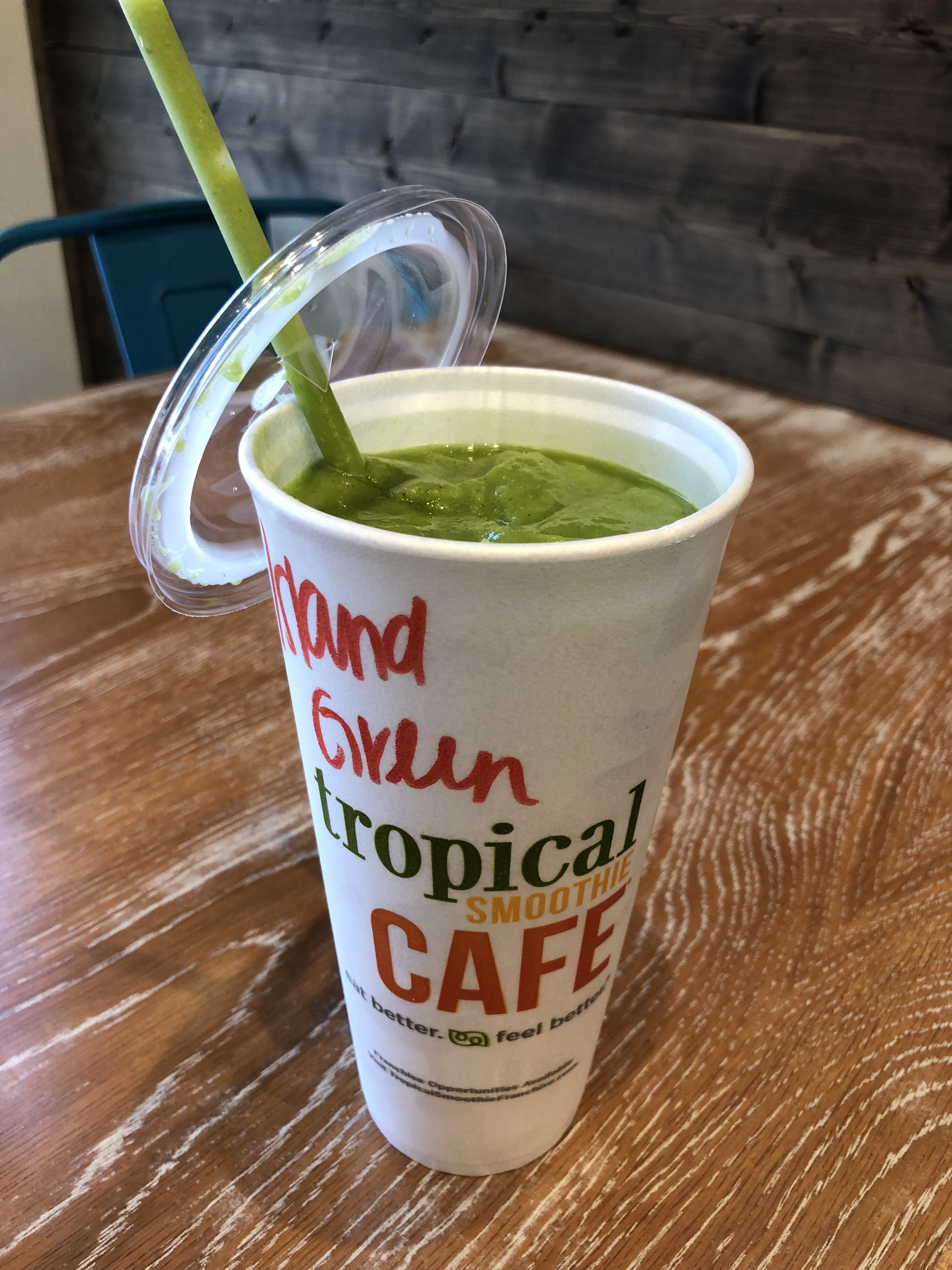
Tropical Smoothie Cafe's Island Green smoothie

Tropical Smoothie began as a smoothie shop in 1993 along the panhandle of Florida. Tropical Smoothie Franchise Development Corporation was founded in 1997 in Destin, Florida, and the first franchised store opened in 1998 in Tallahassee, Florida. Tropical Smoothie Cafe is currently headquartered in Atlanta, Georgia.

In 1999, they introduced a line of food items including sandwiches and wraps. As more locations opened, the individual Cafes redesigned their store decor to offer a beach house theme with bright white walls, an open kitchen concept, vibrant colors, and tropical artwork.

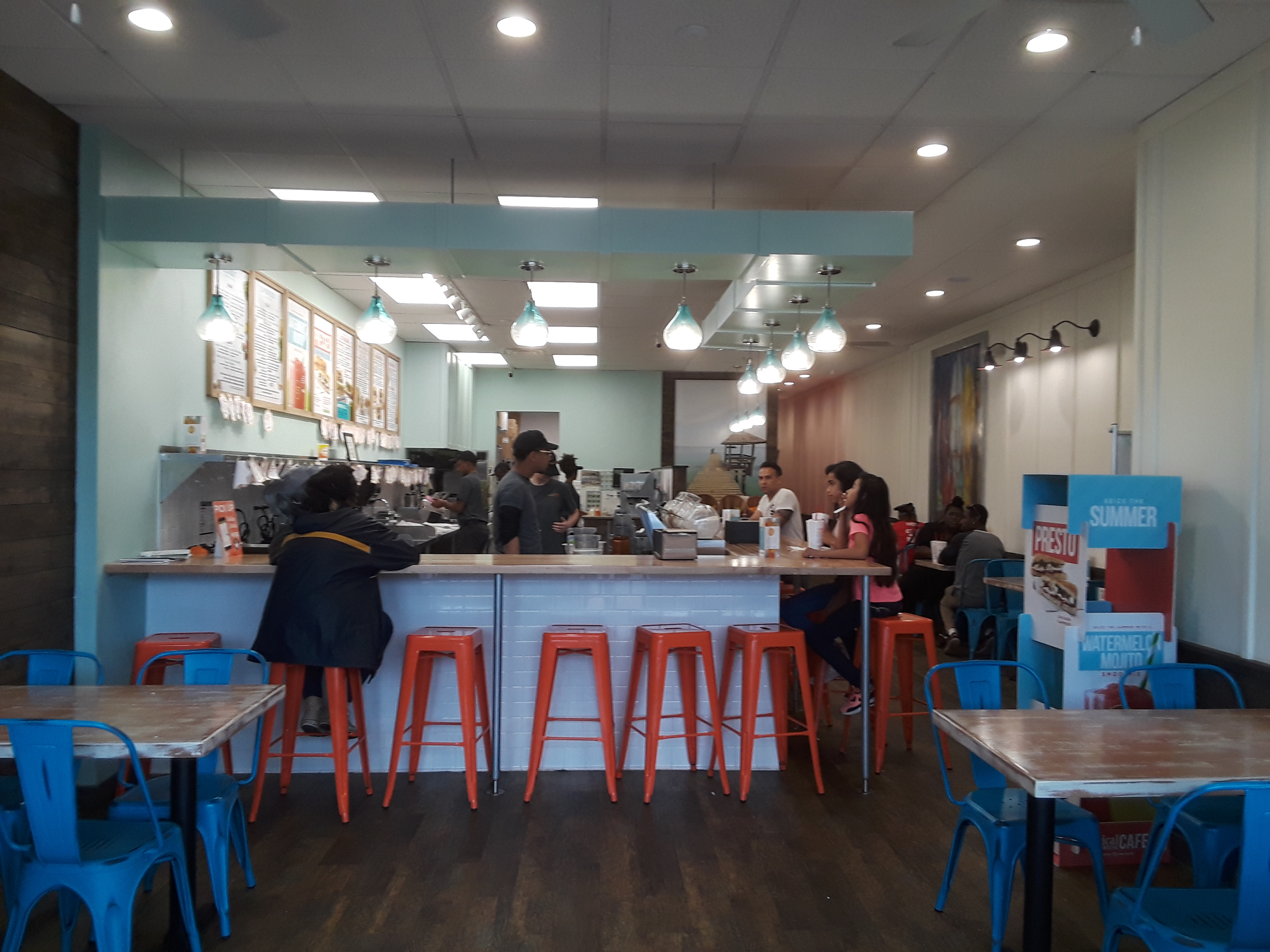
Interior of a Tropical Smoothie Café franchise in Belle Haven, Fairfax County, Virginia

In 2006, Tropical Smoothie Cafe opened their 200th store in Virginia Beach, Virginia. They opened their 800th location in Arlington Heights, Illinois, in 2019.

The founders and original owners, Eric and Delora Jenrich and David Walker, came from franchise backgrounds and used that knowledge to grow Tropical Smoothie Cafe. As they grew, they recruited others from the food industry.

In 2012, private equity firm Buckhead Investment Partners (BIP) bought a controlling interest in Tropical Smoothie Cafe. Eric Jenrich and David Walker remained on the board of directors, and former Chief Operating Officer Mike Rotondo was promoted to replace Jenrich as chief executive officer in 2012 until his departure in 2018. BIP partner Scott Pressly, who was a financial and strategic adviser to the chain since 2007 served as the chairman until 2020. The brand was acquired by private equity firm Levine Leichtman Capital Partners (LLCP) in September 2020. Charles Watson is the chief executive officer.

Between 2019 and 2021, the company was the title sponsor of the Frisco Bowl.

== Menu ==
Tropical Smoothie Cafes sales are made up of 50% smoothie sales and 50% food sales system wide.

In May 2013, Tropical Smoothie Cafe began offering a vegan, non-GMO meat substitute called Beyond Meat. Beyond Meat is made of a blend of fava bean protein, pea protein, flours, and fiber. In July 2013, Tropical Smoothie Cafe announced that Beyond Meat would become a permanent fixture on the menu at certain locations.
