= 2024 Hawaii Rainbow Warriors football team =

American college football season

2024 Hawaii Rainbow Warriors football
- Conference: Mountain West Conference
- Record: 5–7 (3–4 MW)
- Head coach: Timmy Chang (3rd season)
- Co-offensive coordinator: Dan Morrison (1st season)
- Offensive scheme: Run and shoot
- Defensive coordinator: Dennis Thurman (1st season)
- Base defense: 46/Desert Swarm
- Home stadium: Clarence T. C. Ching Athletics Complex

2024 Mountain West Conference football standings
	Conf.			Overall
Team	W		L	W		L
No. 8 Boise State y$^	7	–	0	12	–	2
No. 23 UNLV y	6	–	1	11	–	3
Colorado State	6	–	1	8	–	5
Fresno State	4	–	3	6	–	7
San Jose State	3	–	4	7	–	6
Air Force	3	–	4	5	–	7
Hawaii	3	–	4	5	–	7
New Mexico	3	–	4	5	–	7
Utah State	3	–	4	4	–	8
San Diego State	2	–	5	3	–	9
Wyoming	2	–	5	3	–	9
Nevada	0	–	7	3	–	10
Championship: Boise State 21, UNLV 7
^ – College Football Playoff participant; $ – Conference champion; y – Championship game participant; Rankings from AP Poll

The 2024 Hawaii Rainbow Warriors football team represented the University of Hawaiʻi at Mānoa in the Mountain West Conference during the 2024 NCAA Division I FBS football season. The Rainbow Warriors were led by Timmy Chang in his third year as the head coach. The Rainbow Warriors played home games at the Clarence T. C. Ching Athletics Complex, located in Honolulu, Hawaii.

== Preseason ==
=== Mountain West media poll ===
The Mountain West's preseason prediction poll was released on July 10, 2024.

Mountain West media poll
Predicted finish	Team	Votes (1st place)
1	Boise State	543 (38)
2	UNLV	471 (4)
3	Fresno State	460 (4)
4	Air Force	384
5	Colorado State	337
6	Wyoming	296
7	Utah State	285
8	San Diego State	251
9	Hawaii	214
10	San Jose State	185
11	New Mexico	85
12	Nevada	77

== Schedule ==
Date	Time	Opponent	Site	TV	Result	Attendance
August 24	6:00 p.m.	Delaware State*	Clarence T. C. Ching Athletics Complex; Honolulu, HI	SPEC PPV	W 35–14	12,206
August 31	1:30 p.m.	UCLA*	Clarence T. C. Ching Athletics Complex; Honolulu, HI	CBS	L 13–16	15,194
September 14	1:00 p.m.	at Sam Houston*	Bowers Stadium; Huntsville, TX	ESPN+	L 13–31	15,134
September 21	6:00 p.m.	No. 25 (FCS) Northern Iowa*	Clarence T. C. Ching Athletics Complex; Honolulu, HI	SPEC PPV	W 36–7	11,402
October 5	2:00 p.m.	at San Diego State	Snapdragon Stadium; San Diego, CA	CBSSN	L 24–27	31,307
October 12	5:00 p.m.	No. 17 Boise State	Clarence T. C. Ching Athletics Complex; Honolulu, HI	CBSSN	L 7–28	15,194
October 19	9:30 a.m.	at Washington State*	Martin Stadium; Pullman, WA	The CW	L 10–42	25,112
October 26	6:00 p.m.	Nevada^{†}	Clarence T. C. Ching Athletics Complex; Honolulu, HI	SPEC PPV	W 34–13	12,006
November 2	1:00 p.m.	at Fresno State	Valley Children's Stadium; Fresno, CA (rivalry)	SPEC PPV	W 21–20	41,575
November 9	4:00 p.m.	UNLV	Clarence T. C. Ching Athletics Complex; Honolulu, HI	CBSSN	L 27–29	12,691
November 16	10:00 a.m.	at Utah State	Maverik Stadium; Logan, UT	SPEC PPV	L 10–55	13,348
November 30	6:00 p.m.	New Mexico	Clarence T. C. Ching Athletics Complex; Honolulu, HI	SPEC PPV	W 38–30	12,046
*Non-conference game; ^{†}Homecoming; Rankings from AP Poll and CFP Rankings released prior to game; All times are in Hawaii time

== Game summaries ==
=== Delaware State (FCS) ===
Delaware State Hornets (FCS) at Hawaii Rainbow Warriors – Game summary

Quarter	1	2	3	4	Total
Hornets (FCS)	0	7	7	0	14
Rainbow Warriors	14	0	7	14	35

at Clarence T. C. Ching Athletics Complex, Honolulu, Hawaii

- Date: August 24
- Game time: 6:00 p.m. HDT
- Game weather: Cloudy, 79 °F (26 °C)
- Game attendance: 12,206
- Referee: Cal McNeill
- TV announcers (SPEC PPV): Kanoa Leahey (play-by-play), Rich Miano (analyst) and Jordan Helle (sideline)
- Box score, Recap

Game information

First quarter

- HAW – Tamatoa Mokiao-Atimalala 11-yard pass from Brayden Schager (Kansei Matsuzawa kick), 9:35. Rainbow Warriors 7–0. Drive: 4 plays, 61 yards, 1:26.
- HAW – Tylan Hines 44-yard punt return (Kansei Matsuzawa kick), 0:10. Rainbow Warriors 14–0.

Second quarter

- DSU – Marqui Adams 10-yard run (Nathan Wilson kick), 0:12. Rainbow Warriors 14–7. Drive: 9 plays, 77 yards, 1:43.

Third quarter

- DSU – Jaden Sutton 6-yard run (Nathan Wilson kick), 11:10. Tied 14–14. Drive: 8 plays, 75 yards, 3:50.
- HAW – Brayden Schager 15-yard run (Kansei Matsuzawa kick), 7:42. Rainbow Warriors 21–14. Drive: 8 plays, 67 yards, 3:28.

Fourth quarter

- HAW – Dekel Crowdus 29-yard pass from Brayden Schager (Kansei Matsuzawa kick), 13:40. Rainbow Warriors 28–14. Drive: 5 plays, 45 yards, 2:05.
- HAW – Brayden Schager 1-yard run (Kansei Matsuzawa kick), 3:44. Rainbow Warriors 35–14. Drive: 5 plays, 51 yards, 3:17.

Statistics	DSU	HAW
First downs	11	19
Total yards	260	331
Rushing yards	104	128
Passing yards	156	203
Turnovers	0	0
Time of possession	33:05	26:55

Team	Category	Player	Statistics
Delaware State	Passing	Marqui Adams	17/28, 156 yards
Delaware State	Rushing	Jaden Sutton	12 rushes, 56 yards, TD
Delaware State	Receiving	Ryan Lee	2 receptions, 48 yards
Hawaii	Passing	Brayden Schager	17/34, 203 yards, 2 TD
Hawaii	Rushing	Landon Sims	10 rushes, 58 yards
Hawaii	Receiving	Pofele Ashlock	5 receptions, 81 yards

=== UCLA ===
UCLA Bruins at Hawaii Rainbow Warriors – Game summary

Quarter	1	2	3	4	Total
Bruins	0	0	10	6	16
Rainbow Warriors	7	3	3	0	13

at Clarence T. C. Ching Athletics Complex, Honolulu, Hawaii

- Date: August 31
- Game time: 1:30 p.m. HDT
- Game weather: Sunny, 87 °F (31 °C)
- Game attendance: 15,194
- Referee: Jerry McGinn
- TV announcers (CBS): Rich Waltz (play-by-play), Ross Tucker (analyst), and Tiffany Blackmon (sideline)
- Box score, Recap

Game information
First quarter
- HAW – Pofele Ashlock 19-yard pass from Brayden Schager (Kansei Matsuzawa kick), 7:43. Rainbow Warriors 7–0. Drive: 9 plays, 73 yards, 5:34.

Second quarter

- HAW – Kansei Matsuzawa 28-yard field goal, 0:00. Rainbow Warriors 10–0. Drive: 4 plays, -5 yards, 0:20.

Third quarter

- UCLA – Rico Flores Jr. 39-yard pass from Ethan Garbers (Blake Gessner kick), 8:41. Rainbow Warriors 10–7. Drive: 8 plays, 96 yards, 4:36.
- HAW – Kansei Matsuzawa 28-yard field goal, 4:12. Rainbow Warriors 13–7. Drive: 10 plays, 64 yards, 4:29.
- UCLA – Mateen Bhaghani 22-yard field goal, 0:54. Rainbow Warriors 13–10. Drive: 8 plays, 71 yards, 3:18.

Fourth quarter

- UCLA – Mateen Bhaghani 37-yard field goal, 14:05. Tied 13–13. Drive: 5 plays, 16 yards, 1:33.
- UCLA – Mateen Bhaghani 32-yard field goal, 0:56. Bruins 16–13. Drive: 7 plays, 45 yards, 2:12.

Statistics	UCLA	HAW
First downs	19	18
Total yards	343	278
Rushing yards	71	51
Passing yards	272	227
Turnovers	2	3
Time of possession	27:34	32:26

Team	Category	Player	Statistics
UCLA	Passing	Ethan Garbers	19/38, 272 yards, TD, 2 INT
UCLA	Rushing	Ethan Garbers	7 rushes, 47 yards
UCLA	Receiving	Rico Flores Jr.	3 receptions, 102 yards, TD
Hawaii	Passing	Brayden Schager	25/42, 227 yards, TD, 2 INT
Hawaii	Rushing	Lucas Borrow	1 rush, 19 yards
Hawaii	Receiving	Pofele Ashlock	9 receptions, 112 yards, TD

=== at Sam Houston ===
Hawaii Rainbow Warriors at Sam Houston Bearkats – Game summary

Quarter	1	2	3	4	Total
Rainbow Warriors	0	3	10	0	13
Bearkats	7	10	7	7	31

at Bowers Stadium, Huntsville, Texas

- Date: September 14
- Game time: 1:00 p.m. HDT/6:00 p.m. CDT
- Game weather: Sunny, 96 °F (36 °C)
- Game attendance: 15,134
- Referee: Rory Bernard
- TV announcers (ESPN+): Tom Franklin (play-by-play) and John Harris (analyst)
- Box score, Recap

Game information
First quarter
- SHSU – Qua'Vez Humphreys 7-yard pass from Hunter Watson (Christian Pavon kick), 11:00. Bearkats 7–0. Drive: 9 plays, 75 yards, 4:00.

Second quarter

- HAW – Kansei Matsuzawa 33-yard field goal, 13:24. Bearkats 7–3. Drive: 7 plays, 45 yards, 1:51.
- SHSU – Ife Adeyi 9-yard run (Christian Pavon kick), 5:14. Bearkats 14–3. Drive: 16 plays, 75 yards, 8:10.
- SHSU – Christian Pavon 26-yard field goal, 1:58. Bearkats 17–3. Drive: 7 plays, 27 yards, 2:33.

Third quarter

- HAW – Pofele Ashlock 5-yard pass from Brayden Schager (Kansei Matsuzawa kick), 10:03. Bearkats 17–10. Drive: 11 plays, 75 yards, 4:57.
- SHSU – John Gentry 3-yard pass from Hunter Watson (Christian Pavon kick), 7:20. Bearkats 24–10. Drive: 5 plays, 93 yards, 2:36.
- HAW – Kansei Matsuzawa 27-yard field goal, 1:15. Bearkats 24–13. Drive: 12 plays, 55 yards, 6:05.

Fourth quarter

- SHSU – Qua'Vez Humphreys 55-yard pass from Hunter Watson (Christian Pavon kick), 9:41. Bearkats 31–13. Drive: 4 plays, 68 yards, 2:02.

Statistics	HAW	SHSU
First downs	15	22
Total yards	308	422
Rushing yards	56	257
Passing yards	252	165
Turnovers	1	2
Time of possession	25:38	34:22

Team	Category	Player	Statistics
Hawaii	Passing	Brayden Schager	21/42, 252 yards, TD, INT
Hawaii	Rushing	Cam Barfield	5 rushes, 24 yards
Hawaii	Receiving	Pofele Ashlock	8 receptions, 84 yards, TD
Sam Houston	Passing	Hunter Watson	15/23, 165 yards, 3 TD, INT
Sam Houston	Rushing	Jay Ducker	15 rushes, 148 yards
Sam Houston	Receiving	Qua'Vez Humphreys	4 receptions, 106 yards, 2 TD

=== No. 25 (FCS) Northern Iowa ===
No. 25 (FCS) Northern Iowa Panthers at Hawaii Rainbow Warriors – Game summary

Quarter	1	2	3	4	Total
No. 25 (FCS) Panthers	0	7	0	0	7
Rainbow Warriors	15	7	7	7	36

at Clarence T. C. Ching Athletics Complex, Honolulu, Hawaii

- Date: September 21
- Game time: 6:00 p.m. HDT
- Game weather: Sunny, 78 °F (26 °C)
- Game attendance: 11,402
- Referee: Jonathan Noli
- TV announcers (SPEC PPV): Kanoa Leahey (play-by-play), Rich Miano (analyst) and Jordan Helle (sideline)
- Box score, Recap

Game information
First quarter
- HAW – Jonah Panoke 24-yard pass from Brayden Schager (Kansei Matsuzawa kick), 7:53. Rainbow Warriors 7–0. Drive: 6 plays, 69 yards, 2:58.
- HAW – Pofele Ashlock 6-yard pass from Brayden Schager (Landon Sims pass to Hunter Higham), 0:40. Rainbow Warriors 15–0. Drive: 6 plays, 75 yards, 3:32.

Second quarter

- HAW – Nick Cenacle 20-yard pass from Brayden Schager (Kansei Matsuzawa kick), 9:10. Rainbow Warriors 22–0. Drive: 7 plays, 80 yards, 3:34.
- UNI – Aidan Dunne 3-yard run (Caden Palmer kick), 4:02. Rainbow Warriors 22–7. Drive: 8 plays, 72 yards, 5:00.

Third quarter

- HAW – Nick Cenacle 1-yard pass from Brayden Schager (Kansei Matsuzawa kick), 3:21. Rainbow Warriors 29–7. Drive: 11 plays, 78 yards, 5:48.

Fourth quarter

- HAW – Landon Sims 6-yard run (Kansei Matsuzawa kick), 6:58. Rainbow Warriors 36–7. Drive: 9 plays, 74 yards, 5:07.

Statistics	UNI	HAW
First downs	13	29
Total yards	199	528
Rushing yards	72	149
Passing yards	127	379
Turnovers	2	2
Time of possession	26:58	33:02

Team	Category	Player	Statistics
Northern Iowa	Passing	Aidan Dunne	13/20, 104 yards
Northern Iowa	Rushing	Amauri Pesek-Hickson	6 rushes, 43 yards
Northern Iowa	Receiving	Sergio Morancy	4 receptions, 38 yards
Hawaii	Passing	Brayden Schager	35/43, 374 yards, 4 TD, 2 INT
Hawaii	Rushing	Landon Sims	7 rushes, 35 yards, TD
Hawaii	Receiving	Dekel Crowdus	3 receptions, 83 yards

=== at San Diego State ===
Hawaii Rainbow Warriors at San Diego State Aztecs – Game summary

Quarter	1	2	3	4	Total
Rainbow Warriors	3	7	7	7	24
Aztecs	3	14	3	7	27

at Snapdragon Stadium, San Diego, California

- Date: October 5
- Game time: 2:00 p.m. HDT/5:00 p.m. PDT
- Game weather: Fog, 71 °F (22 °C)
- Game attendance: 31,307
- Referee: Christian Watson
- TV announcers (CBSSN): Chris Lewis (play-by-play) and Robert Turbin (analyst)
- Box score, Recap

Game information
First quarter
- SDSU – Gabriel Plascencia 24-yard field goal, 5:35. Aztecs 3–0. Drive: 16 plays, 53 yards, 6:38.
- HAW – Kansei Matsuzawa 30-yard field goal, 0:43. Tied 3–3. Drive: 15 plays, 77 yards, 4:49.

Second quarter

- SDSU – Marquez Cooper 9-yard run (Gabriel Plascencia kick), 4:49. Aztecs 10–3. Drive: 8 plays, 55 yards, 3:37.
- HAW – Tylan Hines 23-yard pass from Brayden Schager (Kansei Matsuzawa kick), 1:53. Tied 10–10. Drive: 6 plays, 77 yards, 2:50.
- SDSU – Louis Brown IV 16-yard pass from Danny O'Neil (Gabriel Plascencia kick), 0:06. Aztecs 17–10. Drive: 9 plays, 75 yards, 1:47.

Third quarter

- SDSU – Gabriel Plascencia 43-yard field goal, 8:33. Aztecs 20–10. Drive: 10 plays, 19 yards, 4:46.
- HAW – Pofele Ashlock 6-yard pass from Brayden Schager (Kansei Matsuzawa kick), 2:06. Aztecs 20–17. Drive: 12 plays, 75 yards, 6:27.

Fourth quarter

- HAW – Nick Cenacle 23-yard pass from Brayden Schager (Kansei Matsuzawa kick), 9:39. Rainbow Warriors 24–20. Drive: 14 plays, 89 yards, 5:48.
- SDSU – Marquez Cooper 2-yard run (Gabriel Plascencia kick), 7:05. Aztecs 27–24. Drive: 8 plays, 87 yards, 2:30.

Statistics	HAW	SDSU
First downs	24	19
Total yards	356	323
Rushing yards	84	99
Passing yards	272	224
Turnovers	1	0
Time of possession	30:56	29:04

Team	Category	Player	Statistics
Hawaii	Passing	Brayden Schager	26/44, 272 yards, 3 TD, INT
Hawaii	Rushing	Landon Sims	8 rushes, 36 yards
Hawaii	Receiving	Pofele Ashlock	8 receptions, 77 yards, TD
San Diego State	Passing	Danny O'Neil	24/33, 224 yards, TD
San Diego State	Rushing	Marquez Cooper	30 rushes, 109 yards, 2 TD
San Diego State	Receiving	Nate Bennett	4 receptions, 74 yards

=== No. 17 Boise State ===
No. 17 Boise State Broncos at Hawaii Rainbow Warriors – Game summary

Quarter	1	2	3	4	Total
No. 17 Broncos	10	3	0	15	28
Rainbow Warriors	0	7	0	0	7

at Clarence T. C. Ching Athletics Complex, Honolulu, Hawaii

- Date: October 12
- Game time: 5:00 p.m. HDT
- Game weather: Sunny, 81 °F (27 °C)
- Game attendance: 15,194
- Referee: Patrick Foy
- TV announcers (CBSSN): Rich Waltz (play-by-play) and Robert Turbin (analyst)
- Box score, Recap

Game information
First quarter
- BSU – Jonah Dalmas 24-yard field goal, 10:14. Broncos 3–0. Drive: 8 plays, 57 yards, 4:17.
- BSU – Ashton Jeanty 54-yard run (Jonah Dalmas kick), 5:48. Broncos 10–0. Drive: 4 plays, 81 yards, 2:26.

Second quarter

- BSU – Jonah Dalmas 23-yard field goal, 7:06. Broncos 13–0. Drive: 17 plays, 73 yards, 7:49.
- HAW – Tylan Hines 27-yard pass from Brayden Schager (Kansei Matsuzawa kick), 3:24. Broncos 13–7. Drive: 6 plays, 91 yards, 3:33.

Third quarter

- No scoring plays

Fourth quarter

- BSU – Ashton Jeanty 5-yard pass from Maddux Madsen (Maddux Madsen pass to Austin Bolt), 12:00. Broncos 21–7. Drive: 11 plays, 91 yards, 5:03.
- BSU – Austin Bolt 44-yard pass from Maddux Madsen (Jonah Dalmas kick), 3:39. Broncos 28–7. Drive: 5 plays, 81 yards, 1:41.

Statistics	BSU	HAW
First downs	23	17
Total yards	455	287
Rushing yards	238	23
Passing yards	217	264
Turnovers	0	0
Time of possession	32:07	27:53

Team	Category	Player	Statistics
Boise State	Passing	Maddux Madsen	17/25, 217 yards, 2 TD
Boise State	Rushing	Ashton Jeanty	31 rushes, 217 yards, TD
Boise State	Receiving	Cameron Camper	7 receptions, 111 yards
Hawaii	Passing	Brayden Schager	21/37, 264 yards, TD
Hawaii	Rushing	Brayden Schager	16 rushes, 13 yards
Hawaii	Receiving	Nick Cenacle	7 receptions, 59 yards

=== at Washington State ===
Hawaii Rainbow Warriors at Washington State Cougars – Game summary

Quarter	1	2	3	4	Total
Rainbow Warriors	3	0	7	0	10
Cougars	7	14	7	14	42

at Martin Stadium, Pullman, Washington

- Date: October 19
- Game time: 9:30 a.m. HDT/12:30 p.m. PDT
- Game weather: Cloudy, 62 °F (17 °C)
- Game attendance: 25,112
- Referee: Mark Duddy
- TV announcers (The CW): Ted Robinson (play-by-play) and Michael Bumpus (analyst)
- Box score, Recap

Statistics	HAW	WSU
First downs	17	23
Total yards	300	444
Rushing yards	104	123
Passing yards	196	321
Turnovers	3	0
Time of possession	27:30	32:30

Team	Category	Player	Statistics
Hawaii	Passing	Brayden Schager	20/30, 196 yards, TD, INT
Hawaii	Rushing	Cam Barfield	6 rushes, 47 yards
Hawaii	Receiving	Nick Cenacle	4 receptions, 48 yards
Washington State	Passing	John Mateer	23/27, 295 yards, 3 TD
Washington State	Rushing	Djouvensky Schlenbaker	8 rushes, 48 yards
Washington State	Receiving	Kris Hutson	7 receptions, 90 yards, TD

=== Nevada ===
Nevada Wolf Pack at Hawaii Rainbow Warriors – Game summary

Quarter	1	2	3	4	Total
Wolf Pack	0	0	7	6	13
Rainbow Warriors	14	3	7	10	34

at Clarence T. C. Ching Athletics Complex, Honolulu, Hawaii

- Date: October 26
- Game time: 6:00 p.m. HDT
- Game weather: Sunny, 77 °F (25 °C)
- Game attendance: 12,006
- Referee: Christian Watson
- TV announcers (SPEC PPV): Kanoa Leahey (play-by-play), Rich Miano (analyst) and Jordan Helle (sideline)
- Box score, Recap

Statistics	NEV	HAW
First downs	21	26
Total yards	386	399
Rushing yards	100	246
Passing yards	286	153
Turnovers	2	1
Time of possession	28:06	31:54

Team	Category	Player	Statistics
Nevada	Passing	Chubba Purdy	13/18, 155 yards, TD, INT
Nevada	Rushing	Chubba Purdy	8 rushes, 41 yards
Nevada	Receiving	Marcus Bellon	6 receptions, 111 yards, 2 TD
Hawaii	Passing	Brayden Schager	14/25, 153 yards, INT
Hawaii	Rushing	Brayden Schager	19 rushes, 120 yards, 4 TD
Hawaii	Receiving	Jonah Panoke	5 receptions, 58 yards

=== at Fresno State (rivalry) ===
Hawaii Rainbow Warriors at Fresno State Bulldogs – Game summary

Quarter	1	2	3	4	Total
Rainbow Warriors	7	0	0	14	21
Bulldogs	7	6	7	0	20

at Valley Children's Stadium, Fresno, California

- Date: November 2
- Game time: 1:00 p.m. HDT/4:00 p.m. PDT
- Game weather: Sunny, 67 °F (19 °C)
- Game attendance: 41,575
- Referee: Jonathan Noli
- TV announcers (SPEC PPV): Kanoa Leahey (play-by-play) and Rich Miano (analyst)
- Box score, Recap

Game information
First quarter
- HAW – Pofele Ashlock 5-yard pass from Brayden Schager (Kansei Matsuzawa kick), 7:12. Rainbow Warriors 7–0. Drive: 14 plays, 75 yards, 7:48.
- FRES – Elijah Gilliam 10-yard run (Dylan Lynch kick), 1:32. Tied 7–7. Drive: 12 plays, 83 yards, 5:34.

Second quarter

- FRES – Raylen Sharpe 5-yard pass from Mikey Keene (kick blocked), 10:21. Bulldogs 13–7. Drive: 8 plays, 28 yards, 2:31.

Third quarter

- FRES – Phoenix Jackson 89-yard interception return (Dylan Lynch kick), 3:58. Bulldogs 20–7.

Fourth quarter

- HAW – Nick Cenacle 9-yard pass from Brayden Schager (Kansei Matsuzawa kick), 9:04. Bulldogs 20–14. Drive: 12 plays, 87 yards, 4:40.
- HAW – Nick Cenacle 3-yard pass from Brayden Schager (Kansei Matsuzawa kick), 0:15. Rainbow Warriors 21–20. Drive: 10 plays, 47 yards, 1:15.

Statistics	HAW	FRES
First downs	24	14
Total yards	346	176
Rushing yards	102	19
Passing yards	244	157
Turnovers	2	0
Time of possession	38:08	21:52

Team	Category	Player	Statistics
Hawaii	Passing	Brayden Schager	29/53, 244 yards, 3 TD, INT
Hawaii	Rushing	Tylan Hines	12 rushes, 66 yards
Hawaii	Receiving	Nick Cenacle	12 receptions, 113 yards, 2 TD
Fresno State	Passing	Mikey Keene	25/31, 157 yards, TD
Fresno State	Rushing	Elijah Gilliam	10 rushes, 25 yards, TD
Fresno State	Receiving	Raylen Sharpe	5 receptions, 48 yards, TD

=== UNLV ===
UNLV Rebels at Hawaii Rainbow Warriors – Game summary

Quarter	1	2	3	4	Total
Rebels	12	0	10	7	29
Rainbow Warriors	7	3	10	7	27

at Clarence T. C. Ching Athletics Complex, Honolulu, Hawaii

- Date: November 9
- Game time: 4:00 p.m. HST
- Game weather: Sunny • Temperature: 79 °F (26 °C) • Wind: NE 24 miles per hour (39 km/h)
- Game attendance: 12,691
- Referee: Nolan Dumas
- TV announcers (CBSSN): Rich Waltz (play-by-play) and Ross Tucker (analyst)

Game information

First quarter

- (13:02) UNLV – Caden Chittenden 41-yard field goal (Drive: 4 plays, 2 yards, 1:34; UNLV 3–0)
- (8:39) UNLV – Hajj-Malik Williams 23-yard run, Caden Chittenden kick (Drive: 3 plays, 58 yards, 1:08; UNLV 10–0)
- (7:47) HAW – Dekel Crowdus 74-yard pass from Brayden Schager, Kansei Matsuzawa kick (Drive: 2 plays, 75 yards, 0:52; UNLV 10–7)
- (2:48) UNLV – 0-yard safety (UNLV 12–7)

Second quarter

- (3:25) HAW – Kansei Matsuzawa 41-yard field goal (Drive: 9 plays, 57 yards, 2:43; UNLV 12–10)

Third quarter

- (10:26) UNLV – Caden Chittenden 32-yard field goal (Drive: 11 plays, 37 yards, 4:34; UNLV 15–10)
- (8:38) HAW – Jonah Panoke 49-yard pass from Brayden Schager, Kansei Matsuzawa kick (Drive: 4 plays, 75 yards, 1:48; Hawaii 17–15)
- (6:53) UNLV – Ricky White III 37-yard pass from Hajj-Malik Williams, Caden Chittenden kick (Drive: 4 plays, 71 yards, 1:44; UNLV 22–17)
- (0:57) HAW – Kansei Matsuzawa 33-yard field goal (Drive: 11 plays, 58 yards, 5:56; UNLV 22–20)

Fourth quarter

- (6:03) UNLV – Jai'Den Thomas 32-yard run, Caden Chittenden kick (Drive: 3 plays, 54 yards, 1:14; UNLV 29–20)
- (4:15) HAW – Jonah Panoke 5-yard pass from Brayden Schager, Kansei Matsuzawa kick (Drive: 6 plays, 75 yards, 1:48; UNLV 29–27)

Statistics	UNLV	HAW
First downs	22	16
Total yards	465	374
Rushing yards	290	92
Passing yards	175	282
Turnovers	0	1
Time of possession	32:29	27:31

Team	Category	Player	Statistics
UNLV	Passing	Hajj-Malik Williams	13/27, 175 yards, TD
UNLV	Rushing	Hajj-Malik Williams	19 carries, 122 yards, TD
UNLV	Receiving	Ricky White III	7 receptions, 128 yards, TD
Hawaii	Passing	Brayden Schager	14/35, 282 yards, 3 TD, INT
Hawaii	Rushing	Brayden Schager	18 carries, 42 yards
Hawaii	Receiving	Jonah Panoke	6 receptions, 90 yards, 2 TD

=== at Utah State ===
Hawaii Rainbow Warriors at Utah State Aggies – Game summary

Quarter	1	2	3	4	Total
Rainbow Warriors	0	3	0	7	10
Aggies	17	7	21	10	55

at Maverik Stadium, Logan, Utah

- Date: November 16
- Game time: 10:00 a.m. HST/1:00 p.m. MST
- Game weather: Sunny
- Game attendance: 13,348
- Referee: Kenneth Ray
- TV announcers (SPEC PPV): Kanoa Leahey (play-by-play) and Rich Miano (analyst)

Game information

First quarter

- (13:27) USU – Otto Tia 41-yard pass from Spencer Petras, Tanner Cragun kick (Drive: 6 plays, 71 yards, 1:26; Utah State 7–0)
- (5:28) USU – Tanner Cragun 32-yard field goal (Drive: 7 plays, 38 yards, 2:41; Utah State 10–0)
- (1:06) USU – Will Monney 16-yard pass from Spencer Petras, Tanner Cragun kick (Drive: 5 plays, 61 yards, 1:20; Utah State 17–0)

Second quarter

- (8:54) USU – Josh Sterzer 2-yard pass from Bryson Barnes, Tanner Cragun kick (Drive: 14 plays, 95 yards, 5:21; Utah State 24–0)
- (3:35) HAW – Kansei Matsuzawa 40-yard field goal (Drive: 12 plays, 53 yards, 5:19; Utah State 24–3)

Third quarter

- (9:38) USU – Rahsul Faison 37-yard run, Tanner Cragun kick (Drive: 1 play, 37 yards, 0:09; Utah State 31–3)
- (6:18) USU – Rahsul Faison 37-yard run, Tanner Cragun kick (Drive: 3 plays, 66 yards, 1:13; Utah State 38–3)
- (0:57) USU – Josh Sterzer 2-yard pass from Bryson Barnes, Tanner Cragun kick (Drive: 7 plays, 79 yards, 2:32; Utah State 45–3)

Fourth quarter

- (8:35) USU – Derrick Jameson 21-yard run, Tanner Cragun kick (Drive: 4 plays, 41 yards, 2:32; Utah State 52–3)
- (5:42) HAW – Dekel Crowdus 44-yard pass from Micah Alejado, Kansei Matsuzawa kick (Drive: 6 plays, 75 yards, 2:53; Utah State 52–10)
- (1:13) USU – Tanner Cragun 37-yard field goal (Drive: 8 plays, 55 yards, 4:29; Utah State 55–10)

Statistics	HAW	USU
First downs	15	27
Total yards	309	580
Rushing yards	47	321
Passing yards	262	259
Turnovers	5	2
Time of possession	30:18	29:42

Team	Category	Player	Statistics
Hawaii	Passing	Brayden Schager	11/19, 124 yards, 3 INT
Hawaii	Rushing	Landon Sims	6 carries, 28 yards
Hawaii	Receiving	Nick Cenacle	6 receptions, 72 yards
Utah State	Passing	Spencer Petras	20/30, 255 yards, 2 TD, 2 INT
Utah State	Rushing	Rahsul Faison	20 carries, 191 yards, 2 TD
Utah State	Receiving	Otto Tia	6 receptions, 68 yards, TD

=== New Mexico ===
New Mexico Lobos at Hawaii Rainbow Warriors – Game summary

Quarter	1	2	3	4	Total
Lobos	0	9	7	14	30
Rainbow Warriors	7	14	10	7	38

at Clarence T. C. Ching Athletics Complex, Honolulu, Hawaii

- Date: November 30
- Game time: 6:00 p.m. HST
- Game attendance: 12,046
- TV announcers (SPEC PPV): Kanoa Leahey (play-by-play), Rich Miano (analyst) and Jordan Hellie (sideline)

Game information

First quarter

- HAW (7:37) – Pofele Ashlock 3 yard pass from Micah Alejado (Kansei Matsuzawa kick); 12 plays, 94 yards, 5:04 (Hawaii 7-0)

Second quarter

- UNM (13:06) – Devon Dampier 3 yard run (2-point conversion failed); 14 plays, 88 yards, 5:24 (Hawaii 7-6)
- HAW (12:26) – Dekel Crowdus 52 yard pass from Micah Alejado (Kansei Matsuzawa kick); 3 plays, 75 yards, 0:40 (Hawaii 14-6)
- UNM (8:29) – Luke Drzewiecki 36 yard field goal; 11 plays, 64 yards, 3:53 (Hawaii 14-9)
- HAW (2:29) – Tamatoa Mokiao-Atimalala 15 yard pass from Micah Alejado (Kansei Matsuzawa kick); 6 plays, 40 yards, 1:39 (Hawaii 21-9)

Third quarter

- HAW (11:58) – Nick Cenacle 3 yard pass from Micah Alejado (Kansei Matsuzawa kick); 9 plays, 75 yards, 3:02 (Hawaii 28-9)
- UNM (6:56) – Devon Dampier 2 yard run (Luke Drzewiecki kick); 4 plays, 35 yards, 1:21 (Hawaii 28-16)
- HAW (1:23) – Kansei Matsuzawa 19 yard field goal; 13 plays, 74 yards, 5:33 (Hawaii 31-16)

Fourth quarter

- UNM (13:53) – Devon Dampier 1 yard run (Luke Drzewiecki kick); 7 plays, 75 yards, 2:30 (Hawaii 31-23)
- HAW (8:48) – Tamatoa Mokiao-Atimalala 3 yard pass from Micah Alejado (Kansei Matsuzawa kick); 10 plays, 75 yards, 5:05 (Hawaii 38-23)
- UNM (2:34) – NaQuari Rogers 1 yard run (Luke Drzewiecki kick); 14 plays, 75 yards, 6:14 (Hawaii 38-30)

Statistics	UNM	HAW
First downs	30	28
Total yards	481	586
Rushing yards	305	102
Passing yards	176	484
Turnovers	1	0
Time of possession	29:00	31:00

Team	Category	Player	Statistics
New Mexico	Passing	Devon Dampier	19/31, 176 yards
New Mexico	Rushing	Eli Sanders	17 carries, 121 yards
New Mexico	Receiving	Luke Wysong	9 receptions, 69 yards
Hawaii	Passing	Micah Alejado	37/57, 469 yards, 5 TD
Hawaii	Rushing	Micah Alejado	10 carries, 54 yards
Hawaii	Receiving	Spencer Curtis	7 receptions, 100 yards
