= 2024 UNLV Rebels football team =

American college football season

2024 UNLV Rebels football

LA Bowl champion

MW Championship Game, L 7–21 at Boise State

LA Bowl, W 24–13 vs. California
- Conference: Mountain West Conference

Ranking
- Coaches: No. 24
- AP: No. 23
- Record: 11–3 (6–1 MW)
- Head coach: Barry Odom (2nd season; regular season); Del Alexander (interim; bowl game)
- Offensive coordinator: Brennan Marion (2nd season)
- Offensive scheme: Pro spread
- Defensive coordinator: Mike Scherer (2nd season)
- Base defense: Multiple
- Home stadium: Allegiant Stadium

2024 Mountain West Conference football standings
	Conf.			Overall
Team	W		L	W		L
No. 8 Boise State y$^	7	–	0	12	–	2
No. 23 UNLV y	6	–	1	11	–	3
Colorado State	6	–	1	8	–	5
Fresno State	4	–	3	6	–	7
San Jose State	3	–	4	7	–	6
Air Force	3	–	4	5	–	7
Hawaii	3	–	4	5	–	7
New Mexico	3	–	4	5	–	7
Utah State	3	–	4	4	–	8
San Diego State	2	–	5	3	–	9
Wyoming	2	–	5	3	–	9
Nevada	0	–	7	3	–	10
Championship: Boise State 21, UNLV 7
^ – College Football Playoff participant; $ – Conference champion; y – Championship game participant; Rankings from AP Poll

The 2024 UNLV Rebels football team represented the University of Nevada, Las Vegas (UNLV) as a member of the Mountain West Conference (MW) during the 2024 NCAA Division I FBS football season. Led by Barry Odom in his second and final year as head coach for first 13 games of the season and Del Alexander as interim head coach for the team's bowl game, the Rebels compiled an overall record of 11–3 record with a mark of 6–1 in conference play, tying for second place in the MW. UNLV advanced to the Mountain West Championship Game, where the Rebels lost to Boise State for the second consecutive season. UNLV was then invited to the LA Bowl, defeating California. The team played home games at Allegiant Stadium in Paradise, Nevada.

On September 29, the Rebels were ranked in the AP poll for the first time in program history. With their win over Oregon State on October 19, the Rebels were bowl eligible in consecutive seasons for the first time in program history. The win also gave the program their first consecutive winning seasons since their now-forfeited 1983 and 1984 campaigns.

On December 8, Odom accepted the role of head coach for the Purdue Boilermakers starting in 2025. He left UNLV with a 19–8 record. UNLV's bowl victory over California gave the Rebels their 11th victory, the most in a season since 1974 and most since becoming a member of the NCAA Division I Football Bowl Subdivision (FBS).

== Schedule ==
Date	Time	Opponent	Rank	Site	TV	Result	Attendance
August 31	4:00 p.m.	at Houston*		TDECU Stadium; Houston, TX	FS1	W 27–7	25,750
September 7	12:00 p.m.	Utah Tech*		Allegiant Stadium; Paradise, NV	KVVU	W 72–14	24,512
September 13	4:00 p.m.	at Kansas*		Children's Mercy Park; Kansas City, KS	ESPN	W 23–20	21,493
September 28	12:30 p.m.	Fresno State		Allegiant Stadium; Paradise, NV	FS1	W 59–14	24,638
October 4	6:00 p.m.	Syracuse*	No. 25	Allegiant Stadium; Paradise, NV	FS1	L 41–44 ^{OT}	31,329
October 11	6:00 p.m.	at Utah State		Maverik Stadium; Logan, UT	CBSSN	W 50–34	20,295
October 19	7:00 p.m.	at Oregon State*		Reser Stadium; Corvallis, OR	The CW	W 33–25	35,195
October 25	7:30 p.m.	No. 17 Boise State^{†}		Allegiant Stadium; Paradise, NV	CBSSN	L 24–29	42,228
November 9	6:00 p.m.	at Hawaii		Clarence T. C. Ching Athletics Complex; Honolulu, HI	CBSSN	W 29–27	12,691
November 16	7:30 p.m.	San Diego State		Allegiant Stadium; Paradise, NV	CBSSN	W 41–20	30,386
November 22	7:00 p.m.	at San Jose State	No. 24	CEFCU Stadium; San Jose, CA	FS1	W 27–16	13,671
November 30	5:00 p.m.	Nevada	No. 22	Allegiant Stadium; Paradise, NV (Fremont Cannon)	CBSSN	W 38–14	40,122
December 6	5:00 p.m.	at No. 10 Boise State	No. 20	Albertsons Stadium; Boise, ID (MW Conference Championship Game, Big Noon Kickoff)	FOX	L 7–21	36,663
December 18	6:00 p.m.	vs. California*	No. 24	SoFi Stadium; Inglewood, CA (LA Bowl)	ESPN	W 24–13	24,420
*Non-conference game; ^{†}Homecoming; Rankings from AP Poll and CFP Rankings released prior to game; All times are in Pacific time

== Rankings ==
Ranking movements Legend: ██ Increase in ranking ██ Decrease in ranking — = Not ranked RV = Received votes т = Tied with team above or below
	Week																
Poll	Pre	1	2	3	4	5	6	7	8	9	10	11	12	13	14	15	Final
AP	—	RV	RV	RV	RV	25т	—	RV	RV	RV	RV	RV	23	21	19	24	23
Coaches	RV	RV	RV	25	23	23	RV	RV	RV	RV	RV	RV	23	21	19	24	24
CFP	Not released										—	—	24	22	20	24	Not released

== Preseason ==
The Mountain West's preseason media poll was released on July 10, 2024. UNLV was predicted to finish second in the conference.

== Game summaries ==
=== at Houston ===
UNLV Rebels (0–0) at Houston Cougars (0–0) – Game summary

Quarter	1	2	3	4	Total
Rebels	7	7	10	3	27
Cougars	0	0	0	7	7

at TDECU Stadium • Houston, TX

- Date: August 31, 2024
- Game time: 4:00 p.m.
- Game weather: Cloudy, 90 °F (32 °C)
- Game attendance: 25,750
- Referee: Michael VanderVelde
- TV announcers (FS1): Alex Faust (play-by-play) and Robert Smith (analyst)

Game information

First quarter

- (8:10) UNLV – Jacob De Jesus 13-yard pass from Matthew Sluka, Caden Chittenden kick (Drive: 5 plays, 75 yards, 1:26; UNLV 7–0)

Second quarter

- (12:49) UNLV – Jacob De Jesus 24-yard pass from Matthew Sluka, Caden Chittenden kick (Drive: 5 plays, 55 yards, 1:58; UNLV 14–0)

Third quarter

- (9:49) UNLV – Caden Chittenden 40-yard field goal (Drive: 9 plays, 27 yards, 3:57; UNLV 17–0)
- (5:23) UNLV – Jalen Catalon 36-yard interception return, Caden Chittenden kick (UNLV 24–0)

Fourth quarter

- (5:00) UNLV – Caden Chittenden 34-yard field goal (Drive: 4 plays, 3 yards, 2:14; UNLV 27–0)
- (1:00) HOU – Joseph Manjack IV 2-yard pass from Ui Ale, Joseph Kim kick (Drive: 12 plays, 90 yards, 3:51; UNLV 27–7)

Statistics	UNLV	HOU
First downs	14	14
Total yards	308	247
Rushing yards	48–195	26–38
Passing yards	113	209
Passing: Comp–Att–Int	7–14–1	22–38–2
Time of possession	31:27	28:33

Team	Category	Player	Statistics
UNLV	Passing	Matthew Sluka	6/13, 71 yards, 2 TD, INT
UNLV	Rushing	Michael Allen	10 carries, 65 yards
UNLV	Receiving	Jaden Bradley	2 receptions, 60 yards
Houston	Passing	Donovan Smith	15/30, 135 yards, 2 INT
Houston	Rushing	Parker Jenkins	2 carries, 17 yards
Houston	Receiving	Mekhi Mews	3 receptions, 57 yards

=== vs. Utah Tech ===
Utah Tech Trailblazers (0–1) vs UNLV Rebels (1–0) – Game summary

Quarter	1	2	3	4	Total
Trailblazers	7	0	7	0	14
Rebels	28	16	7	21	72

at Allegiant Stadium • Paradise, NV

- Date: September 7, 2024
- Game time: 12:00 p.m.
- Game weather: None (Indoor stadium)
- Game attendance: 24,512
- Referee: Kenneth Ray
- TV announcers (KVVU-TV): Matt Neverett (play-by-play), Caleb Herring (analyst), and Steve Cofield (sideline)

Game information

First quarter

- (13:54) UNLV – Jai'Den Thomas 27-yard run, Caden Chittenden kick (Drive: 3 plays, 64 yards, 1:02; UNLV 7–0)
- (12:57) UTU – Alec Burton 64-yard pass from Deacon Hill, Ilya Uvaydov kick (Drive: 3 plays, 75 yards, 0:57; Tied 7–7)
- (10:59) UNLV – Ricky White III 5-yard pass from Matthew Sluka, Caden Chittenden kick (Drive: 7 plays, 51 yards, 1:57; UNLV 14–7)
- (7:33) UNLV – Ricky White III 55-yard pass from Matthew Sluka, Caden Chittenden kick (Drive: 4 plays, 76 yards, 1:54; UNLV 21–7)
- (2:42) UNLV – Ricky White III 7-yard pass from Matthew Sluka, Caden Chittenden kick (Drive: 9 plays, 62 yards, 3:16; UNLV 28–7)

Second quarter

- (14:11) UNLV – Caden Chittenden 27-yard field goal (Drive: 4 plays, 5 yards, 1:15; UNLV 31–7)
- (12:23) UNLV – Matthew Sluka 30-yard run, Caden Chittenden kick (Drive: 3 plays, 72 yards, 0:55; UNLV 38–7)
- (9:41) UNLV – Caden Chittenden 28-yard field goal (Drive: 4 plays, 3 yards, 1:13; UNLV 41–7)
- (2:05) UNLV – Caden Chittenden 36-yard field goal (Drive: 9 plays, 59 yards, 5:47; UNLV 44–7)

Third quarter

- (5:17) UNLV – Greg Burrell 4-yard run, Caden Chittenden kick (Drive: 12 plays, 60 yards, 5:28; UNLV 51–7)
- (1:14) UTU – Chris Street 31-yard pass from Deacon Hill, Ilya Uvaydov kick (Drive: 9 plays, 75 yards, 4:03; UNLV 51–14)

Fourth quarter

- (13:08) UNLV – Timothy Conerly 8-yard run, Andre Meono kick (Drive: 8 plays, 64 yards, 2:58; UNLV 58–14)
- (8:50) UNLV – Cameron Friel 1-yard run, Andre Meono kick (Drive: 5 plays, 75 yards, 2:24; UNLV 65–14)
- (2:25) UNLV – Devin Green 38-yard run, Andre Meono kick (Drive: 7 plays, 66 yards, 4:33; UNLV 72–14)

Statistics	UTU	UNLV
First downs	13	34
Total yards	293	695
Rushing yards	67	504
Passing yards	226	191
Passing: Comp–Att–Int	18–34–1	9–18–0
Time of possession	23:43	36:17

Team	Category	Player	Statistics
Utah Tech	Passing	Deacon Hill	14/28, 188 yards, 2 TD, INT
Utah Tech	Rushing	Reggie Graff	5 carries, 30 yards
Utah Tech	Receiving	Alec Burton	1 reception, 64 yards, TD
UNLV	Passing	Matthew Sluka	8/17, 161 yards, 3 TD
UNLV	Rushing	Greg Burrell	11 carries, 101 yards, TD
UNLV	Receiving	Ricky White III	5 receptions, 111 yards, 3 TD

=== at Kansas ===
UNLV Rebels (2–0) at Kansas Jayhawks (1–1) – Game summary

Quarter	1	2	3	4	Total
Rebels	3	10	3	7	23
Jayhawks	7	10	3	0	20

at Children's Mercy Park • Kansas City, KS

- Date: September 13, 2024
- Game time: 4:00 p.m.
- Game weather: Sunny, 76 °F (24 °C)
- Game attendance: 21,493
- Referee: Mike McCabe
- TV announcers (ESPN): Anish Shroff (play-by-play), Andre Ware (analyst), and Paul Carcaterra (sideline)

Game information

First quarter

- (6:22) KAN – Jalon Daniels 11-yard run, Tabor Allen kick (Drive: 12 plays, 81 yards, 7:16; Kansas 7–0)
- (1:33) UNLV – Caden Chittenden 38-yard field goal (Drive: 11 plays, 55 yards, 4:49; Kansas 7–3)

Second quarter

- (12:12) KAN – Jalon Daniels 33-yard run, Tabor Allen kick (Drive: 8 plays, 94 yards, 4:10; Kansas 14–3)
- (6:19) UNLV – Caden Chittenden 27-yard field goal (Drive: 12 plays, 66 yards, 5:53; Kansas 14–6)
- (3:17) KAN – Tabor Allen 35-yard field goal (Drive: 7 plays, 58 yards, 3:02; Kansas 17–6)
- (0:00) UNLV – Jai'Den Thomas 27-yard pass from Matthew Sluka, Caden Chittenden kick (Drive: 2 plays, 33 yards, 0:31; Kansas 17–13)

Third quarter

- (9:38) UNLV – Caden Chittenden 23-yard field goal (Drive: 4 plays, -1 yards, 1:22; Kansas 17–16)

Fourth quarter

- (11:22) KAN – Tabor Allen 41-yard field goal (Drive: 13 plays, 75 yards, 5:44; Kansas 20–16)
- (2:00) UNLV – Kylin James 1-yard run, Caden Chittenden kick (Drive: 18 plays, 75 yards, 9:22; UNLV 23–20)

Statistics	UNLV	KU
First downs	17	17
Total yards	267	352
Rushing yards	47–181	35–199
Passing yards	86	153
Passing: Comp–Att–Int	7–18–0	12–24–2
Time of possession	31:06	28:54

Team	Category	Player	Statistics
UNLV	Passing	Matthew Sluka	7/18, 86 yards, TD
UNLV	Rushing	Matthew Sluka	19 carries, 124 yards
UNLV	Receiving	Jaden Bradley	1 reception, 31 yards
Kansas	Passing	Jalon Daniels	12/24, 153 yards, 2 INT
Kansas	Rushing	Devin Neal	23 carries, 120 yards
Kansas	Receiving	Lawrence Arnold	4 receptions, 58 yards

=== vs Fresno State ===
Fresno State Bulldogs (3–1) vs UNLV Rebels (3–0) – Game summary

Quarter	1	2	3	4	Total
Bulldogs	0	0	7	7	14
Rebels	14	7	10	28	59

at Allegiant Stadium • Paradise, NV

- Date: September 28, 2024
- Game time: 12:30 p.m.
- Game weather: None (Indoor stadium)
- Game attendance: 24,638
- Referee: Jonathan Noli
- TV announcers (FS1): Chris Vosters (play-by-play) and Charles Arbuckle (analyst)

Game information

First quarter

- (6:20) UNLV – Hajj-Malik Williams 6-yard run, Caden Chittenden kick (Drive: 3 plays, 29 yards, 1:07; UNLV 7–0)
- (0:27) UNLV – Ricky White III 13-yard blocked punt return, Caden Chittenden kick (UNLV 14–0)

Second quarter

- (1:57) UNLV – Ricky White III 12-yard pass from Hajj-Malik Williams, Caden Chittenden kick (Drive: 7 plays, 42 yards, 3:23; UNLV 21–0)

Third quarter

- (12:48) UNLV – Kaleo Ballungay 17-yard pass from Hajj-Malik Williams, Caden Chittenden kick (Drive: 5 plays, 75 yards, 2:12; UNLV 28–0)
- (6:52) UNLV – Cam Chittenden 45-yard field goal (Drive: 6 plays, 33 yards, 3:14; UNLV 31–0)
- (2:33) FRES – Malik Sherrod 6-yard run, Dylan Lynch kick (Drive: 10 plays, 66 yards, 4:13; UNLV 31–7)

Fourth quarter

- (14:52) UNLV – Ricky White III 15-yard pass from Hajj-Malik Williams, Caden Chittenden kick (Drive: 6 plays, 68 yards, 2:35; UNLV 38–7)
- (11:04) UNLV – Jai'Den Thomas 7-yard run, Caden Chittenden kick (Drive: 5 plays, 66 yards, 1:51; UNLV 45–7)
- (6:36) FRES – Mac Dalena 9-yard pass from Mikey Keene, Dylan Lynch kick (Drive: 10 plays, 75 yards, 4:28; UNLV 45–14)
- (6:24) UNLV – Jai'Den Thomas 90-yard kickoff return, Caden Chittenden kick (UNLV 52–14)
- (3:10) UNLV – Cameron Friel 1-yard run, Caden Chittenden kick (Drive: 5 plays, 25 yards, 2:36; UNLV 59–14)

Statistics	FRES	UNLV
First downs	24	25
Total yards	346	450
Rushing yards	30	252
Passing yards	316	198
Passing: Comp–Att–Int	28–45–4	14–17–0
Time of possession	33:32	24:39

Team	Category	Player	Statistics
Fresno State	Passing	Mikey Keene	27/41, 316 yards, TD, 2 INT
Fresno State	Rushing	Jonathan Arceneaux	4 carries, 30 yards
Fresno State	Receiving	Raylen Sharpe	10 receptions, 116 yards
UNLV	Passing	Hajj-Malik Williams	13/16, 182 yards, 3 TD
UNLV	Rushing	Hajj-Malik Williams	12 carries, 119 yards, TD
UNLV	Receiving	Ricky White III	10 receptions, 127 yards, 2 TD

=== vs Syracuse ===
Syracuse Orange (3–1) vs No. 25 UNLV Rebels (4–0) – Game summary

Quarter	1	2	3	4	OT	Total
Orange	14	3	14	7	6	44
No. 25 Rebels	0	21	10	7	3	41

at Allegiant Stadium • Paradise, NV

- Date: October 4, 2024
- Game time: 6:00 p.m.
- Game weather: None (Indoor stadium)
- Game attendance: 31,329
- Referee: Adam Savoie
- TV announcers (FS1): Trent Rush (play-by-play) and Petros Papadakis (analyst)

Game information

First quarter

- (8:43) SYR – LeQuint Allen 9-yard pass from Kyle McCord, Jayden Oh kick (Drive: 9 plays, 75 yards, 5:22; Syracuse 7–0)
- (0:44) SYR – LeQuint Allen 3-yard run, Jayden Oh kick (Drive: 9 plays, 87 yards, 4:30; Syracuse 14–0)

Second quarter

- (12:17) UNLV – Kaleo Ballungay 6-yard pass from Hajj-Malik Williams, Caden Chittenden kick (Drive: 8 plays, 75 yards, 3:27; Syracuse 14–7)
- (8:30) UNLV – Hajj-Malik Williams 3-yard run, Caden Chittenden kick (Drive: 2 plays, 56 yards, 0:30; Tied 14–14)
- (5:57) UNLV – Casey Cain 9-yard pass from Hajj-Malik Williams, Caden Chittenden kick (Drive: 2 plays, 9 yards, 0:42; UNLV 21–14)
- (0:07) SYR – Jayden Oh 21-yard field goal (Drive: 16 plays, 72 yards, 5:50; UNLV 21–17)

Third quarter

- (9:12) SYR – LeQuint Allen 6-yard pass from Kyle McCord, Jayden Oh kick (Drive: 12 plays, 75 yards, 5:48; Syracuse 24–21)
- (8:36) SYR – Yasin Willis 21-yard run, Jayden Oh kick (Drive: 1 play, 21 yards, 0:06; Syracuse 31–21)
- (3:24) UNLV – Caden Chittenden 20-yard field goal (Drive: 11 plays, 73 yards, 5:12; Syracuse 31–24)
- (0:28) UNLV – Charles Correa 0-yard punt return, Caden Chittenden kick (Tied 31–31)

Fourth quarter

- (2:58) UNLV – Ricky White III 9-yard pass from Hajj-Malik Williams, Caden Chittenden kick (Drive: 10 plays, 94 yards, 5:07; UNLV 38–31)
- (0:23) SYR – Jackson Meeks 6-yard pass from Kyle McCord, Jayden Oh kick (Drive: 11 plays, 75 yards, 2:35; Tied 38–38)

Overtime

- (0:00) UNLV – Caden Chittenden 41-yard field goal (Drive: 4 plays, 3 yards, 0:00; UNLV 41–38)
- (0:00) SYR – LeQuint Allen 1-yard run (Drive: 8 plays, 25 yards, 0:00; Syracuse 44–41)

Statistics	SYR	UNLV
First downs	34	20
Total yards	492	354
Rushing yards	137	127
Passing yards	355	227
Passing: Comp–Att–Int	40–63–1	21–25–1
Time of possession	39:38	20:22

Team	Category	Player	Statistics
Syracuse	Passing	Kyle McCord	40/63, 355 yards, 3 TD, INT
Syracuse	Rushing	LeQuint Allen	19 carries, 71 yards, 2 TD
Syracuse	Receiving	Oronde Gadsden II	10 receptions, 142 yards
UNLV	Passing	Hajj-Malik Williams	21/25, 227 yards, 3 TD, INT
UNLV	Rushing	Jai'Den Thomas	6 carries, 64 yards
UNLV	Receiving	Ricky White III	10 receptions, 135 yards, TD

=== at Utah State ===
UNLV Rebels (4–1) at Utah State Aggies (1–4) – Game summary

Quarter	1	2	3	4	Total
Rebels	14	27	6	3	50
Aggies	7	0	14	13	34

at Maverik Stadium • Logan, UT

- Date: October 11, 2024
- Game time: 6:00 p.m.
- Game weather: Sunny, 54 °F (12 °C)
- Game attendance: 20,295
- Referee: Cal McNeill
- TV announcers (CBSSN): Carter Blackburn (play-by-play) and Randy Cross (analyst), and Amanda Guerra (sideline)

Game information

First quarter

- (13:50) UNLV – Kylin James 5-yard run, Caden Chittenden kick (Drive: 4 plays, 75 yards, 1:10; UNLV 7–0)
- (5:40) UNLV – Ricky White III 18-yard pass from Hajj-Malik Williams, Caden Chittenden kick (Drive: 7 plays, 49 yards, 2:19; UNLV 14–0)
- (1:11) USU – Rahsul Faison 20-yard run, Tanner Cragun kick (Drive: 11 plays, 79 yards, 4:22; UNLV 14–7)

Second quarter

- (13:35) UNLV – Caden Chittenden 33-yard field goal (Drive: 8 plays, 60 yards, 2:37; UNLV 17–7)
- (11:56) UNLV – Casey Cain 18-yard pass from Hajj-Malik Williams, Caden Chittenden kick (Drive: 4 plays, 37 yards, 1:33; UNLV 24–7)
- (9:24) UNLV – Kylin James 22-yard run, Caden Chittenden kick (Drive: 3 plays, 37 yards, 1:25; UNLV 31–7)
- (3:37) UNLV – Caden Chittenden 46-yard field goal (Drive: 5 plays, 36 yards, 2:42; UNLV 34–7)
- (1:53) UNLV – Ricky White III 31-yard pass from Hajj-Malik Williams, Caden Chittenden kick (Drive: 3 plays, 31 yards, 1:04; UNLV 41–7)

Third quarter

- (12:09) USU – Jack Hestera 24-yard pass from Spencer Petras, Tanner Cragun kick (Drive: 8 plays, 66 yards, 2:44; UNLV 41–14)
- (10:26) UNLV – Jai'Den Thomas 29-yard run (Drive: 4 plays, 61 yards, 1:37; UNLV 47–14)
- (7:10) USU – Jalen Royals 13-yard pass from Spencer Petras, Tanner Cragun kick (Drive: 9 plays, 75 yards, 3:17; UNLV 47–21)

Fourth quarter

- (11:36) USU – Broc Lane 6-yard pass from Spencer Petras, Tanner Cragun kick (Drive: 8 plays, 67 yards, 2:56; UNLV 47–28)
- (3:31) UNLV – Andre Meono 36-yard field goal (Drive: 6 plays, 64 yards, 3:23; UNLV 50–28)
- (1:18) USU – Herschel Turner 3-yard run (Drive: 11 plays, 75 yards, 2:13; UNLV 50–34)

Statistics	UNLV	USU
First downs	25	32
Total yards	546	584
Rushing yards	313	123
Passing yards	233	461
Passing: Comp–Att–Int	13–20–0	41–59–3
Time of possession	31:02	28:58

Team	Category	Player	Statistics
UNLV	Passing	Hajj-Malik Williams	13/20, 233 yards, 3 TD
UNLV	Rushing	Jai'Den Thomas	17 carries, 139 yards, TD
UNLV	Receiving	Ricky White III	7 receptions, 138 yards, 2 TD
Utah State	Passing	Spencer Petras	41/59, 461 yards, 3 TD, 3 INT
Utah State	Rushing	Rahsul Faison	15 carries, 83 yards, TD
Utah State	Receiving	Jalen Royals	10 receptions, 155 yards, TD

=== at Oregon State ===
UNLV Rebels (5–1) at Oregon State Beavers (4–2) – Game summary

Quarter	1	2	3	4	Total
Rebels	3	13	7	10	33
Beavers	3	14	0	8	25

at Reser Stadium • Corvallis, OR

- Date: October 19, 2024
- Game time: 7:00 p.m.
- Game weather: Cloudy • Temperature: 62 °F (17 °C) • Wind: NW 4 miles per hour (6.4 km/h)
- Game attendance: 35,195
- Referee: Chris Wiggins
- TV announcers (The CW): Thom Brennaman (play-by-play), Max Browne (analyst), and Heidi Watney (sideline)

Game information

First quarter

- (7:57) OSU – Everett Hayes 20-yard field goal (Drive: 11 plays, 76 yards, 6:58; Oregon State 3–0)
- (0:34) UNLV – Caden Chittenden 20-yard field goal (Drive: 15 plays, 82 yards, 7:16; Tied 3–3)

Second quarter

- (8:55) OSU – Gevani McCoy 1-yard run, Everett Hayes kick (Drive: 12 plays, 75 yards, 6:39; Oregon State 10–3)
- (4:12) UNLV – Caden Chittenden 34-yard field goal (Drive: 12 plays, 59 yards, 4:43; Oregon State 10–6)
- (2:36) OSU – Gevani McCoy 71-yard run, Everett Hayes kick (Drive: 3 plays, 75 yards, 1:36; Oregon State 17–6)
- (1:25) UNLV – Hajj-Malik Williams 2-yard run, Caden Chittenden kick (Drive: 5 plays, 75 yards, 1:11; Oregon State 17–13)
- (0:00) UNLV – Caden Chittenden 34-yard field goal (Drive: 3 plays, 21 yards, 0:16; Oregon State 17–16)

Third quarter

- (4:21) UNLV – Hajj-Malik Williams 9-yard run, Caden Chittenden kick (Drive: 2 plays, 19 yards, 0:42; UNLV 23–17)

Fourth quarter

- (13:28) UNLV – Caden Chittenden 29-yard field goal (Drive: 14 plays, 61 yards, 4:51; UNLV 26–17)
- (4:53) UNLV – Ricky White III 22-yard pass from Hajj-Malik Williams, Caden Chittenden kick (Drive: 1 play, 22 yards, 0:06; UNLV 33–17)
- (2:14) OSU – Anthony Hankerson 3-yard run, Jermaine Terry II pass (Drive: 11 plays, 75 yards, 2:39; UNLV 33–25)

Statistics	UNLV	OSU
First downs	21	21
Total yards	384	368
Rushing yards	188	137
Passing yards	196	231
Passing: Comp–Att–Int	15–27–1	21–37–0
Time of possession	28:34	31:26

Team	Category	Player	Statistics
UNLV	Passing	Hajj-Malik Williams	15/27, 196 yards, TD, INT
UNLV	Rushing	Hajj-Malik Williams	13 carries, 65 yards, 2 TD
UNLV	Receiving	Ricky White III	9 receptions, 88 yards, TD
Oregon State	Passing	Gevani McCoy	21/37, 231 yards
Oregon State	Rushing	Gevani McCoy	16 carries, 81 yards, 2 TD
Oregon State	Receiving	Trent Walker	9 receptions, 88 yards

=== vs No. 17 Boise State ===
No. 17 Boise State Broncos (5–1) vs UNLV Rebels (6–1) – Game summary

Quarter	1	2	3	4	Total
No. 17 Broncos	3	17	3	6	29
Rebels	10	0	14	0	24

at Allegiant Stadium • Paradise, NV

- Date: October 26, 2024
- Game time: 7:30 p.m.
- Game weather: None (Indoor stadium)
- Game attendance: 42,228
- Referee: Nolan Dumas
- TV announcers (CBSSN): Rich Waltz (play-by-play), Robert Turbin (analyst), and Tiffany Blackmon (sideline)

Game information

First quarter

- (11:34) BSU - Jonah Dalmas 34-yard field goal (Drive: 7 plays, 55 yards, 3:26; Boise State 3-0)
- (8:47) UNLV - Caden Chittenden 28-yard field goal (Drive: 6 plays, 64 yards, 2:41; Tied 3-3)
- (4:30) UNLV - Kaleo Ballungay 9-yard pass from Hajj-Malik Williams, Caden Chittenden kick (Drive: 6 plays, 66 yards, 2:30; UNLV 10-3)

Second quarter

- (9:22) BSU - Jonah Dalmas 44-yard field goal (Drive: 9 plays, 39 yards, 3:38; UNLV 10-6)
- (1:50) BSU - Maddux Madsen 7-yard run, Jonah Dalmas kick (Drive: 11 plays, 80 yards, 4:35; Boise State 13-10)
- (0:06) BSU - Matt Lauter 2-yard pass from Maddux Madsen, Jonah Dalmas kick (Drive: 4 plays, 7 yards, 1:28; Boise State 20-10)

Third quarter

- (11:10) UNLV - Hajj-Malik Williams 5-yard run, Caden Chittenden kick (Drive: 9 plays, 70 yards, 3:42; Boise State 20-17)
- (8:24) BSU - Jonah Dalmas 29-yard field goal (Drive: 8 plays, 64 yards, 2:46; Boise State 23-17)
- (1:03) UNLV - Jaden Bradley 34-yard pass from Hajj-Malik Williams, Caden Chittenden kick (Drive: 5 plays, 53 yards, 1:37; UNLV 24-23)

Fourth quarter

- (12:38) BSU - Ashton Jeanty 1-yard run, two-point pass failed (Drive: 8 plays, 75 yards, 3:25; Boise State 29-24)

Statistics	BSU	UNLV
First downs	21	16
Total yards	394	367
Rushing yards	185	188
Passing yards	209	179
Passing: Comp–Att–Int	18–33–0	12–22–1
Time of possession	33:58	25:54

Team	Category	Player	Statistics
Boise State	Passing	Maddux Madsen	18/33, 209 yards, TD
Boise State	Rushing	Ashton Jeanty	33 carries, 128 yards, TD
Boise State	Receiving	Austin Bolt	2 receptions, 43 yards
UNLV	Passing	Hajj-Malik Williams	12/21, 179 yards, 2 TD, INT
UNLV	Rushing	Hajj-Malik Williams	19 carries, 105 yards, TD
UNLV	Receiving	Ricky White III	5 receptions, 57 yards

=== at Hawaii ===
Game Nine – UNLV Rebels (6–2) vs Hawaii Rainbow Warriors (4–5) – Game summary

Quarter	1	2	3	4	Total
Rebels	12	0	10	7	29
Rainbow Warriors	7	3	10	7	27

at Clarence T.C. Ching Athletics Complex • Honolulu, HI

- Date: Saturday November 9, 2024
- Game time: 6:00 p.m.
- Game weather: Sunny • Temperature: 79 °F (26 °C) • Wind: NE 24 miles per hour (39 km/h)
- Game attendance: 12,691
- Referee: Nolan Dumas
- TV announcers (CBSSN): Rich Waltz (play-by-play) and Ross Tucker (analyst)

Game information

First quarter

- (13:02) UNLV – Caden Chittenden 41-yard field goal (Drive: 4 plays, 2 yards, 1:34; UNLV 3–0)
- (8:39) UNLV – Hajj-Malik Williams 23-yard run, Caden Chittenden kick (Drive: 3 plays, 58 yards, 1:08; UNLV 10–0)
- (7:47) HAW – Dekel Crowdus 74-yard pass from Brayden Schager, Kansei Matsuzawa kick (Drive: 2 plays, 75 yards, 0:52; UNLV 10–7)
- (2:48) UNLV – 0-yard safety (UNLV 12–7)

Second quarter

- (3:25) HAW – Kansei Matsuzawa 41-yard field goal (Drive: 9 plays, 57 yards, 2:43; UNLV 12–10)

Third quarter

- (10:26) UNLV – Caden Chittenden 32-yard field goal (Drive: 11 plays, 37 yards, 4:34; UNLV 15–10)
- (8:38) HAW – Jonah Panoke 49-yard pass from Brayden Schager, Kansei Matsuzawa kick (Drive: 4 plays, 75 yards, 1:48; Hawaii 17–15)
- (6:53) UNLV – Ricky White III 37-yard pass from Hajj-Malik Williams, Caden Chittenden kick (Drive: 4 plays, 71 yards, 1:44; UNLV 22–17)
- (0:57) HAW – Kansei Matsuzawa 33-yard field goal (Drive: 11 plays, 58 yards, 5:56; UNLV 22–20)

Fourth quarter

- (6:03) UNLV – Jai'Den Thomas 32-yard run, Caden Chittenden kick (Drive: 3 plays, 54 yards, 1:14; UNLV 29–20)
- (4:15) HAW – Jonah Panoke 5-yard pass from Brayden Schager, Kansei Matsuzawa kick (Drive: 6 plays, 75 yards, 1:48; UNLV 29–27)

Statistics	UNLV	HAW
First downs	22	16
Total yards	465	374
Rushing yards	290	92
Passing yards	175	282
Passing: Comp–Att–Int	13–28–0	14–35–1
Time of possession	32:29	27:31

Team	Category	Player	Statistics
UNLV	Passing	Hajj-Malik Williams	13/27, 175 yards, TD
UNLV	Rushing	Hajj-Malik Williams	19 carries, 122 yards, TD
UNLV	Receiving	Ricky White III	7 receptions, 128 yards, TD
Hawaii	Passing	Brayden Schager	14/35, 282 yards, 3 TD, INT
Hawaii	Rushing	Brayden Schager	18 carries, 42 yards
Hawaii	Receiving	Jonah Panoke	6 receptions, 90 yards, 2 TD

=== vs San Diego State ===
San Diego State Aztecs (3–6) vs UNLV Rebels (7–2) – Game summary

Quarter	1	2	3	4	Total
Aztecs	0	6	7	7	20
Rebels	7	21	10	3	41

at Allegiant Stadium • Paradise, NV

- Date: November 16, 2024
- Game time: 7:30 p.m.
- Game weather: None (Indoor stadium)
- Game attendance: 30,386
- Referee: Michael Cuttone
- TV announcers (CBSSN): Carter Blackburn (play-by-play), Randy Cross (analyst), Keiana Martin (sideline) and Matt Kirshner (producer)

Game information

First quarter

- UNLV (4:05) – Kaleo Ballungay 2 yard pass from Hajj-Malik Williams (Caden Chittenden kick); 4 plays, 50 yards, 2:08 (UNLV 7-0)

Second quarter

- UNLV (14:24) – Greg Burrell 20 yard run (Caden Chittenden kick); 9 plays, 70 yards, 3:02 (UNLV 14-0)
- UNLV (9:20) – Jai'Den Thomas 4 yard run (Caden Chittenden kick); 6 plays, 38 yards, 2:12 (UNLV 21-0)
- SDSU (3:25) – Louis Brown IV 29 yard pass from Danny O'Neil (Two-point pass conversion failed); 5 plays, 40 yards, 2:07 (UNLV 21-6)
- UNLV (0:16) – Hajj-Malik Williams 12 yard run (Caden Chittenden kick); 5 plays, 47 yards, 0:45 (UNLV 28-6)

Third quarter

- UNLV (9:40) – Hajj-Malik Williams 7 yard run (Caden Chittenden kick); 8 plays, 73 yards, 3:48 (UNLV 35-6)
- SDSU (8:22) – Ja'Shaun Poke 46 yard pass from Danny O'Neil (Gabriel Plascencia kick); 4 plays, 75 yards, 1:18 (UNLV 35-13)
- UNLV (6:46) – Caden Chittenden 46 yard field goal; 5 plays, 47 yards, 1:36 (UNLV 38-13)

Fourth quarter

- SDSU (13:46) – Danny O'Neil 1 yard run (Gabriel Plascencia kick); 8 plays, 35 yards, 3:06 (UNLV 38-20)
- UNLV (9:37) – Caden Chittenden 21 yard field goal; 10 plays, 72 yards, 5:02 (UNLV 41-20)

Statistics	SDSU	UNLV
First downs	14	26
Total yards	270	515
Rushing yards	107	253
Passing yards	163	262
Passing: Comp–Att–Int	14–23–2	23–32–0
Time of possession	23:58	36:55

Team	Category	Player	Statistics
San Diego State	Passing	Danny O'Neil	13/22, 162 yards, 2 TD, 2 INT
San Diego State	Rushing	Marquez Cooper	26 carries, 97 yards
San Diego State	Receiving	Ja'Shaun Poke	3 receptions, 79 yards, TD
UNLV	Passing	Hajj-Malik Williams	20/29, 244 yards, TD
UNLV	Rushing	Greg Burrell	10 carries, 58 yards, TD
UNLV	Receiving	Jacob De Jesus	7 receptions, 75 yards

=== at San Jose State ===
No. 24 UNLV Rebels (8–2) at San Jose State Spartans (6–4) – Game summary

Quarter	1	2	3	4	Total
No. 24 Rebels	3	7	10	7	27
Spartans	0	16	0	0	16

at CEFCU Stadium • San Jose, CA

- Date: November 22, 2024
- Game time: 7:00 p.m.
- Game weather: Rain • Temperature: 60 °F (16 °C) • Wind: S 10 miles per hour (16 km/h)
- Game attendance: 13,671
- Referee: Jonathan Noli
- TV announcers (FS1): Trent Rush (play-by-play) and Petros Papadakis (analyst)

Game information

First quarter

- (2:54) UNLV – Caden Chittenden 31-yard field goal (Drive: 4 plays, 4 yards, 1:16; UNLV 3–0)

Second quarter

- (13:26) SJSU – Isiah Revis 40-yard interception, Kyler Halvorsen kick (San Jose State 7–3)
- (7:36) UNLV – Kaleo Ballungay 5-yard pass from Hajj-Malik Williams, Caden Chittenden kick (Drive: 13 plays, 75 yards, 5:50; UNLV 10–7)
- (5:02) SJSU – Matthew Coleman 33-yard pass from Walker Eget, Kyler Halvorsen kick (Drive: 7 plays, 75 yards, 2:34; San Jose State 14–10)
- (1:04) SJSU – 0-yard safety (San Jose State 16–10)

Third quarter

- (11:11) UNLV – Caden Chittenden 52-yard field goal (Drive: 9 plays, 25 yards, 3:39; San Jose State 16–13)
- (1:44) UNLV – Jai'Den Thomas 25-yard run, Caden Chittenden kick (Drive: 5 plays, 74 yards, 1:30; UNLV 20–16)

Fourth quarter

- (8:29) UNLV – Kylin James 7-yard run, Caden Chittenden kick (Drive: 13 plays, 80 yards, 6:20; UNLV 27–16)

Statistics	UNLV	SJSU
First downs	24	9
Total yards	338	112
Rushing yards	207	31
Passing yards	131	81
Passing: Comp–Att–Int	11–20–1	4–22–0
Time of possession	40:42	19:18

Team	Category	Player	Statistics
UNLV	Passing	Hajj-Malik Williams	11/20, 131 yards, TD, INT
UNLV	Rushing	Jai'Den Thomas	26 carries, 135 yards, TD
UNLV	Receiving	Ricky White III	7 receptions, 98 yards
San Jose State	Passing	Walker Eget	4/22, 81 yards, TD
San Jose State	Rushing	Floyd Chalk IV	18 carries, 56 yards
San Jose State	Receiving	Matthew Coleman	1 reception, 33 yards, TD

=== vs. Nevada ===
Game Twelve – Nevada Wolf Pack (3–9) at No. 22 UNLV Rebels (9–2) – Game summary

Quarter	1	2	3	4	Total
Wolf Pack	7	0	0	7	14
No. 22 Rebels	10	14	7	7	38

at Allegiant Stadium • Paradise, NV

- Date: Saturday November 30, 2024
- Game time: 5:00 PM PST
- Game weather: None (Indoor stadium)
- Game attendance: 40,122
- Referee: Cal McNeill
- TV announcers (CBSSN): John Sadak (play-by-play), Robert Turbin (analyst) and Emily Proud (sideline reporter)

Game information

First quarter

- (12:42) UNLV – Kaleo Ballungay 1-yard pass from Hajj-Malik Williams, Caden Chittenden kick (Drive: 6 plays, 69 yards, 2:11; UNLV 7–0)
- (10:03) NEV – Cortez Braham 45-yard pass from Brendon Lewis, Kian Afrookhteh kick (Drive: 6 plays, 75 yards, 2:39; Tied 7–7)
- (5:50) UNLV – Caden Chittenden 26-yard field goal (Drive: 9 plays, 62 yards, 4:07; UNLV 10–7)

Second quarter

- (14:05) UNLV – Jackson Woodard 0-yard fumble recovery, Caden Chittenden kick (UNLV 17–7)
- (4:53) UNLV – Jai'Den Thomas 1-yard run, Caden Chittenden kick (Drive: 11 plays, 72 yards, 5:46; UNLV 24–7)

Third quarter

- (6:00) UNLV – Hajj-Malik Williams 13-yard run, Caden Chittenden kick (Drive: 11 plays, 81 yards, 5:19; UNLV 31–7)

Fourth quarter

- (11:53) UNLV – Ricky White III 17-yard pass from Hajj-Malik Williams, Caden Chittenden kick (Drive: 7 plays, 76 yards, 2:58; UNLV 38–7)
- (1:19) NEV – Jaden Smith 20-yard pass from Brendon Lewis, Kian Afrookteh kick (Drive: 10 plays, 89 yards, 3:27; UNLV 38–7)

Statistics	NEV	UNLV
First downs	22	28
Total yards	359	519
Rushing yards	67	351
Passing yards	292	168
Passing: Comp–Att–Int	27–38–1	14–21–0
Time of possession	30:41	29:19

Team	Category	Player	Statistics
Nevada	Passing	Brendon Lewis	27/37, 292 yards, 2 TD, INT
Nevada	Rushing	Brendon Lewis	16 carries, 30 yards
Nevada	Receiving	Jaden Smith	9 receptions, 92 yards, TD
UNLV	Passing	Hajj-Malik Williams	14/21, 168 yards, 2 TD
UNLV	Rushing	Jai'Den Thomas	15 carries, 135 yards, TD
UNLV	Receiving	Jacob De Jesus	6 receptions, 84 yards

=== at No. 10 Boise State—Mountain West Championship Game ===
2024 Mountain West Championship Game
No. 20 UNLV Rebels (10-2, 6-1) at No. 10 Boise State (11-1, 7-0)

Quarter	1	2	3	4	Total
No. 20 Rebels	0	0	0	7	7
No. 10 Broncos	7	14	0	0	21

at Albertsons Stadium • Boise, Idaho

- Date: December 6th, 2024
- Game time: 6:00 p.m. MST
- Game weather: Temperature: 27 °F (−3 °C) • Wind: WNW at 6 miles per hour (9.7 km/h) • Weather: Foggy
- Game attendance: 36,663
- Referee: Christian Watson
- TV announcers (FOX): Jason Benetti (play-by-play), Brock Huard (Color analyst), and Allison Williams (Sideline reporter)

Game information

First Quarter

- (3:51) BSU – Latrell Caples 22 yard pass from Maddux Madsen, Jonah Dalmas kick (Drive: 4 plays, 55 yards, 2:33; Boise State 7–0)

Second Quarter

- (2:40) BSU – Maddux Madsen 14 yard run, Jonah Dalmas kick (Drive: 12 plays, 69 yards, 6:33; Boise State 14–0)
- (0:29) BSU – Ashton Jeanty 75 yard run, Jonah Dalmas kick (Drive: 2 plays, 80 yards, 0:47; Boise State 21–0)

Third Quarter

No scoring plays

Fourth Quarter

- (9:06) UNLV – Greg Burrell 31 yard run, Caden Chittenden kick (Drive: 9 plays, 81 yards, 3:30; Boise State 21–7)

Statistics	UNLV	BSU
First downs	13	19
Total yards	327	373
Rushing yards	217	215
Passing yards	110	158
Turnovers	1	0
Time of possession	27:46	32:14

Team	Category	Player	Statistics
UNLV	Passing	Hajj-Malik Williams	13/28, 110 yards, INT
UNLV	Rushing	Kylin James	2 carries, 95 yards
UNLV	Receiving	Corey Thompson Jr.	2 receptions, 32 yards
Boise State	Passing	Maddux Madsen	18/27, 158 yards, TD
Boise State	Rushing	Ashton Jeanty	32 carries, 209 yards, TD
Boise State	Receiving	Matt Lauter	5 receptions, 62 yards

=== vs California—LA Bowl ===
2024 LA Bowl
California Golden Bears (6–6, 2–6) at No. 24 UNLV Rebels (10–3, 6–1)

Quarter	1	2	3	4	Total
Golden Bears	10	3	0	0	13
No. 24 Rebels	7	7	7	3	24

at SoFi Stadium • Inglewood, California

- Date: Wednesday, December 18, 2024
- Game time: 6:00 p.m.
- Game weather: Clear • Temperature: 73 °F (23 °C) • Wind: W at 4 miles per hour (6.4 km/h) (fixed roof)
- Game attendance: 24,420
- Referee: Ted Pitts
- TV announcers (ESPN): Bob Wischusen (play-by-play), Louis Riddick (analyst) and Kris Budden (sideline)

Game information

First quarter

- (7:45) CAL – Derek Morris 43 yard field goal (Drive: 5 plays, 52 yards, 2:13; California 3–0)
- (5:04) UNLV – Kayden McGee 49 yard pass from Hajj-Malik Williams, Caden Chittenden kick (Drive: 9 plays, 75 yards, 2:41; UNLV 7–3)
- (0:19) CAL – Josiah Martin 29 yard run, Derek Morris kick (Drive: 9 plays, 89 yards, 4:45; California 10–7)

Second quarter

- (13:17) UNLV – Jacob De Jesus 9 yard pass from Hajj-Malik Williams, Caden Chittenden kick (Drive: 6 plays, 75 yards, 2:02; UNLV 14–10)
- (1:50) CAL – Ryan Coe 30 yard field goal (Drive: 13 plays, 32 yards, 5:40; UNLV 14–13)

Third quarter

- (2:13) UNLV – Kylin James 23 yard run, Caden Chittenden kick (Drive: 1 plays, 23 yards, 0:06; UNLV 21–13)

Fourth quarter

- (6:01) UNLV – Caden Chittenden 48 yard field goal (Drive: 4 play, -5 yards, 2:08; UNLV 24–13)

Win Probability

Line

Over/Under

Statistics	CAL	UNLV
First downs	21	12
Total yards	348	291
Rushing yards	182	143
Passing yards	166	148
Passing: Comp–Att–Int	19–39–0	6–19–0
Time of possession	35:50	24:10

Team	Category	Player	Statistics
California	Passing	C. J. Harris	13/20, 109 yards
California	Rushing	Jaydn Ott	11 carries, 109 yards
California	Receiving	Jack Endries	7 receptions, 61 yards
UNLV	Passing	Hajj-Malik Williams	5/18, 96 yards, 2 TD
UNLV	Rushing	Jai'Den Thomas	18 carries, 72 yards
UNLV	Receiving	Cameron Oliver	1 reception, 52 yards

== Personnel ==
=== Roster ===
2024 UNLV Rebels football team roster
Players
Coaches
Offense

Pos.	#	Name	Class
WR	1	Casey Cain	Jr
WR	2	Damien McDaniel	Fr
QB	3	Matthew Sluka	Sr
RB	5	Greg Burrell	Fr
QB	6	Hajj-Malik Williams	Sr
QB	7	Cameron Friel	Sr
WR	8	Timothy Conerly	Sr
RB	9	Jai'Den Thomas	So
WR	10	DeAngelo Irvin Jr.	So
WR	11	Ricky White	Sr
WR	13	Corey Thompson Jr.	So
QB	14	Gael Ochoa	Fr
WR	15	Landon Rogers	Jr
WR	16	Kayden McGee	Fr
QB	18	Lucas Lenhoff	Fr
TE	19	Kaleo Ballungay	Sr
RB	20	Kylin James	Sr
WR	21	Jacob De Jesus	Sr
RB	22	Devin Green	Fr
WR	23	Jaden Bradley	Jr
RB	24	Darrien Jones	Fr
RB	25	Rogerick Ray	Sr
FB	38	Sammy Norris	Jr
TE	40	Davis Ambuehl	So
TE	43	Jae Beasley II	Fr
TE	44	Christian Moore	Sr
RB	49	Jacob Rosendahl	So
OL	51	Mason Vicari	Fr
OL	54	Anthony Rosas	Jr
OL	57	Dyllan Drummond	Fr
OL	61	Graham Keating III	Jr
OL	62	Nick Scalise	Jr
OL	63	Amare Taase	Fr
OL	64	Hank Purvis	Fr
OL	65	Jack Hasz	Sr
OL	66	Carver Banker	Fr
OL	67	Toby Moore	Fr
OL	68	Jayden Ahboah	Jr
OL	70	Tiger Shanks	Sr
OL	71	Ed Haynes	Fr
OL	72	Will Thomas	So
OL	74	Jalen St. John	Sr
OL	75	Anton Ambuehl	Jr
OL	78	Mathyus Su'a	Sr
OL	79	Austin Boyd	So
WR	80	Isaiah Harris	Fr
WR	81	Traivon Dyson	Jr
WR	82	Rashawn Jackson	Fr
TE	83	Cooper Haswell	Fr
TE	84	Matthew Greene	Fr
WR	86	David Titone-Perez	Fr
TE	87	Christian Earls	Jr
TE	88	Jacob Beza	Fr
WR	89	Malik Bradford	Jr

Defense

Pos.	#	Name	Class
DB	0	Tony Grimes	Sr
DB	1	Jalen Catalon	Sr
DE	2	Antonio Doyle Jr.	Sr
DB	3	Johnathan Baldwin	Sr
DB	4	Malik Chavis	Sr
DB	5	Cameron Oliver	Sr
DB	6	Jeremiah Vessel	Fr
LB	7	Jackson Woodard	Sr
ILB	8	Marsel McDuffie	Jr
DB	9	Jett Elad	Sr
DB	10	Tre Fulton	Fr
LB	11	Koi Pa'ao'ao	Fr
DB	13	Jarvis Ware	Sr
DB	14	Jah'Von Grigsby	Jr
LB	15	Melvin Laster	Fr
LB	16	Mani Powell	Jr
DB	17	La'Vario Wiley	Sr
DB	22	Nijrell Eason II	Fr
DB	24	Kodi DeCambra	Fr
DB	25	Jaylen Allen	Fr
DL	26	Ose Egbase	Sr
DB	27	Kela Moore	Fr
DL	28	Fisher Camac	So
DB	29	Saadite Green Jr.	Jr
LB	30	Charles Correa	Fr
DB	31	Jalen Baldwin	Fr
OLB	34	Tyray O'Dell	Sr
DB	35	Anthony Costanzo	So
DB	37	Devin Hartsuck	Fr
LB	39	JT Odom	Fr
DB	40	Daego Albert	Sr
DB	41	Rashod Tanner	Jr
DE	42	Andre Porter	Fr
DL	44	Waisale Muavesi	Sr
LB	46	Brennon Scott	Sr
DL	48	Halatoa Tai	So
DL	50	Jalen Dixon	Sr
LB	53	Blesyng Alualu-Tuiolemotu	Fr
DL	55	Shko-Mak Pahmahmie	Fr
DL	91	Cooper Webb	Sr
DL	92	Maxwell Peterson	Fr
DL	93	Lucas Conti	Fr
DL	94	Max Mogelson	Fr
DL	95	Alexander Whitmore	Sr
DL	97	Grant Hessler	Jr
DL	98	Tatuo Martinson	Sr
DL	99	Keith Conley Jr.	Sr

Special teams

Pos.	#	Name	Class
PK	32	Ramon Villela	Fr
LS	36	Ben Lisk	Jr
PK	45	Caden Chittenden	Fr
LS	52	Sam Wolfenden	Fr
LS	59	Walker Hardan	Sr
PK	83	Andre Meono	Jr
P	85	Konner Melzer	Jr
P	90	Marshall Nichols	Jr

Head coach

- Barry Odom

Coordinators/assistant coaches

- Brennan Marion – Offensive coordinator/quarterbacks
- Mike Scherer – Defensive coordinator/linebackers
- James Shibest – Special teams coordinator
- Vance Vice – Offensive line
- Cornell Ford – Running backs
- Del Alexander – Wide receivers
- Nate Longshore – Tight ends
- Ricky Logo – Defensive linemen
- Akeem Davis – Cornerbacks
- Nicco Fertitta – Safeties
- James Brown – Special teams analyst
- Kenneth Merchant – Offensive analyst
- Kyle Buckner – Graduate assistant - offense
- Mitch Malot – Graduate assistant - offense
- Bam Amina – Graduate assistant - defense
- Julio Garcia – Graduate assistant - defense
- Ronnell Perkins – Graduate assistant - defense

Legend

- (C) Team captain
- (S) Suspended
- (I) Ineligible
- Injured
- Redshirt

Roster
Last update: 2/17/25
