= 2024 LA Bowl =

Postseason college football bowl game

2024 Art of Sport LA Bowl Hosted by Gronk
- 4th LA Bowl
California Golden Bears	UNLV Rebels
(6–6)	(10–3)
ACC	Mountain West
13	24
Head coach: Justin Wilcox	Head coach: Del Alexander (interim)
	AP / Coaches / CFP; 24 / 24 / 24
	1	2	3	4	Total
California	10	3	0	0	13
UNLV	7	7	7	3	24
- Date: December 18, 2024
- Season: 2024
- Stadium: SoFi Stadium
- Location: Inglewood, California
- MVP: Off.: Jacob De Jesus (WR, UNLV); Def.: Jackson Woodard (LB, UNLV)
- Favorite: UNLV by 3.5
- Referee: Ted Pitts (Sun Belt)
- Attendance: 24,420

United States TV coverage
- Network: ESPN; ESPN Radio
- Announcers: Bob Wischusen (play-by-play), Louis Riddick (analyst), and Kris Budden (sideline) (ESPN); Roxy Bernstein (play-by-play) and Max Starks (analyst) (ESPN Radio)

The 2024 LA Bowl was a college football bowl game played on December 18, 2024, at SoFi Stadium located in Inglewood, California. The fourth annual LA Bowl game featured California and UNLV. The game began at approximately 6:00 p.m. PST and aired on ESPN. The LA Bowl was one of the 2024–25 bowl games concluding the 2025 FBS football season. Through a marketing agreement with former National Football League player Rob Gronkowski, and sponsorship by Art of Sport, a Starco Brands subsidiary, the game was officially known as the Art of Sport LA Bowl Hosted by Gronk.

== Teams ==
The bowl featured the California Golden Bears of the Atlantic Coast Conference (ACC) and the UNLV Rebels of the Mountain West Conference; California was selected due to being a former Pac-12 Conference school.

This was the second meeting between California and UNLV, the first coming in 2022, a 20–14 victory for the Golden Bears in Berkeley. Neither team had appeared in a previous LA Bowl.

=== California Golden Bears ===
California entered the game with an 6–6 record (2–6 in the ACC), tied for 14th place in their conference. The Golden Bears faced and lost to three ranked FBS teams during the regular season: Miami (FL), Pittsburgh, and SMU.

=== UNLV Rebels ===
UNLV entered the game with an 10–3 record (6–1 in the MW), tied for second place in their conference and ranked 24th in both the AP poll and the College Football Playoff (CFP) final rankings. The Rebels became the first ranked team to play in an LA Bowl. Their most recent prior bowl victory was in the 2000 Las Vegas Bowl.

The Rebels faced and lost to one ranked team during the regular season, Boise State by a 29–24 score. UNLV qualified for the Mountain West Conference Championship Game but again lost to Boise State, 21–7. For the LA Bowl, UNLV named Del Alexander interim head coach, following Barry Odom leaving the program to accept the head coaching position at Purdue.

With the Rebels win, UNLV won its first bowl game since 2000.

== Game summary ==
2024 LA Bowl

Quarter	1	2	3	4	Total
California	10	3	0	0	13
No. 24 UNLV	7	7	7	3	24

at SoFi Stadium • Inglewood, California

- Date: Wednesday, December 18, 2024
- Game time: 6:11 p.m. PST
- Game weather: Clear • Temperature: 72 °F (22 °C) • Wind: 4 mph (6.4 km/h) northwest (fixed roof)
- Game attendance: 24,420
- TV announcers (ESPN): Bob Wischusen (play-by-play), Louis Riddick (analyst), and Kris Budden (sideline)
- Box score

Game information

First quarter

- (7:45) CAL – Derek Morris 43 yard field goal (Drive: 5 plays, 52 yards, 2:13; California 3–0)
- (5:04) UNLV – Kayden McGee 49 yard pass from Hajj-Malik Williams, Caden Chittenden kick (Drive: 9 plays, 75 yards, 2:41; UNLV 7–3)
- (0:19) CAL – Josiah Martin 29 yard run, Derek Morris kick (Drive: 9 plays, 89 yards, 4:45; California 10–7)

Second quarter

- (13:17) UNLV – Jacob De Jesus 9 yard pass from Hajj-Malik Williams, Caden Chittenden kick (Drive: 6 plays, 75 yards, 2:02; UNLV 14–10)
- (1:50) CAL – Ryan Coe 30 yard field goal (Drive: 13 plays, 32 yards, 5:40; UNLV 14–13)

Third quarter

- (2:13) UNLV – Kylin James 23 yard run, Caden Chittenden kick (Drive: 1 plays, 23 yards, 0:06; UNLV 21–13)

Fourth quarter

- (6:01) UNLV – Caden Chittenden 48 yard field goal (Drive: 4 play, -5 yards, 2:08; UNLV 24–13)

=== Statistics ===
Statistics	CAL	UNLV
First downs	21	12
Plays–yards	82–348	60–291
Rushes–yards	43–182	41–143
Passing yards	166	148
Passing: comp–att–int	19–39–0	6–19–0
Time of possession	36:09	23:51

Team	Category	Player	Statistics
California	Passing	CJ Harris	13/20, 109 yards
California	Rushing	Jaydn Ott	11 carries, 84 yards
California	Receiving	Jack Endries	7 receptions, 61 yards
UNLV	Passing	Hajj-Malik Williams	5/18, 96 yards, 2 TD
UNLV	Rushing	Jai'Den Thomas	18 carries, 72 yards
UNLV	Receiving	Cameron Oliver	1 reception, 52 yards
