= Del Alexander =

American football player and coach (born 1971)

Current position
- Title: Wide receivers coach
- Team: UNLV
- Conference: MW

Biographical details
- Born: July 16, 1971 (age 55); Los Angeles, California, U.S.

Playing career
- 1991–1992: West Los Angeles
- 1993–1994: USC
- Position: Wide receiver

Coaching career (HC unless noted)
- 1996–1997: USC (GA)
- 1998: UNLV (WR)
- 1999: San Diego Chargers (OA)
- 2000: UNLV (WR)
- 2001: UNLV (QB/WR)
- 2002: UNLV (WR)
- 2003–2004: Oregon State (WR/RC)
- 2005–2006: San Diego (RB)
- 2007–2011: Wisconsin (WR)
- 2012–2016: Arizona State (TE)
- 2017–2021: Notre Dame (WR)
- 2022: Georgia Tech (WR)
- 2023–2024: UNLV (WR)
- 2024: UNLV (interim HC)
- 2025–present: UNLV (WR)

Head coaching record
- Overall: 1–0
- Bowls: 1–0

DelVaughn Alexander (born July 16, 1971) is an American football coach and former wide receiver. He played college football at West Los Angeles College before transferring to USC. He was the interim head football coach of the University of Nevada, Las Vegas for their bowl game in 2024.

== College career ==
Alexander played college football at the University of Southern California where he backed up Johnnie Morton and Keyshawn Johnson. Prior to USC, Alexander went to West Los Angeles College.

== Coaching career ==
Between 1995 and 1997, Alexander was a graduate assistant coach for the USC Trojans. Alexander was the wide receivers coach for the University of Notre Dame. Prior to that, he coached at Arizona State University, University of Wisconsin–Madison, University of San Diego, Oregon State University and the University of Nevada, Las Vegas (UNLV). He also worked for the National Football League's San Diego Chargers. In the spring of 2022, Alexander was hired as the wide receivers coach at Georgia Tech. He served as the interim head coach for the University of Nevada, Las Vegas (UNLV) for their bowl game in 2024.

== Head coaching record ==
Year	Team	Overall	Conference	Standing	Bowl/playoffs	Coaches^{#}	AP^{°}
UNLV Rebels (Mountain West Conference) (2024)
2024	UNLV	1–0	0–0	T–2nd	W LA‡	24	23
UNLV:		1–0	0–0	‡ Interim head coach for bowl, replacing Barry Odom			
Total:		1–0					
