= Mountain West Conference Football Championship Game =

College football championship game

- Sport: College football
- Conference: Mountain West Conference
- Current stadium: Hosted by top regular-season team (see below)
- Current location: Varies by year
- Played: 2013–present
- Last contest: 2025
- Current champion: Boise State Broncos
- Most championships: Boise State (6)
- TV partner: Fox/FS1
- Official website: League Site

The Mountain West Conference Football Championship Game is an annual postseason college football game played to determine the champion of the Mountain West Conference (MW).

== History ==
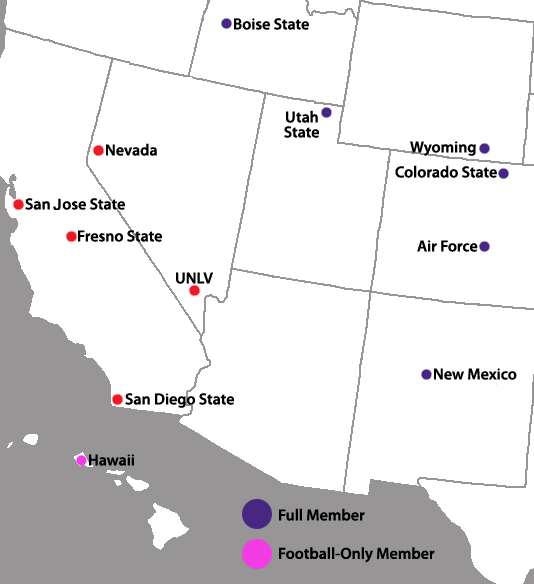
Locations of Mountain West Conference members.

From 1999 to 2012, the champion of the Mountain West was determined by regular season record. Beginning in 2013, following the expansion to twelve members and the division of the conference into Mountain and West Divisions, the conference championship game was held between the two division winners. The Mountain West is one of four conferences to have its championship game at a campus site, along with the American Athletic Conference, Conference USA, and the Sun Belt Conference.

The most recent 2022 championship game was the last to feature division winners. On May 20, 2022, the MW announced that it would eliminate its football divisions effective with the 2023 season, instead sending the top two teams in the conference standings to the title game. Two days earlier, the NCAA Division I Council had approved a rule change that gave all FBS conferences full freedom to determine the participants in their football championship games.

The inaugural MW Championship Game was played on December 7, 2013, at Fresno State's Bulldog Stadium and televised by CBS.

== Members ==
Membership is current for the upcoming 2026 season, reflecting membership changes that become official that July.

Air Force
Hawaii
Nevada
New Mexico
North Dakota State
Northern Illinois
San Jose State
UNLV
UTEP
Wyoming

== Results ==
=== Mountain West Conference champions (1999–2012) ===
Season	Champion(s)	Conference record	Overall record	Bowl result
1999	Utah	5–2	9–3	**Won** Las Vegas Bowl
1999	BYU	5–2	8–4	Lost Motor City Bowl
1999	Colorado State	5–2	8–4	Lost Liberty Bowl
2000	No. 14 Colorado State	6–1	10–2	**Won** Liberty Bowl
2001	No. 25 BYU	7–0	12–2	Lost Liberty Bowl
2002	Colorado State	6–1	10–4	Lost Liberty Bowl
2003	No. 21 Utah	6–1	10–2	**Won** Liberty Bowl
2004	No. 4 Utah	7–0	12–0	**Won** Fiesta Bowl
2005	No. 11 TCU	8–0	11–1	**Won** Houston Bowl
2006	No. 16 BYU	8–0	11–2	**Won** Las Vegas Bowl
2007	No. 14 BYU	8–0	11–2	**Won** Las Vegas Bowl
2008	No. 2 Utah	8–0	13–0	**Won** Sugar Bowl
2009	No. 6 TCU	8–0	12–1	Lost Fiesta Bowl
2010	No. 2 TCU	8–0	13–0	**Won** Rose Bowl
2011	No. 14 TCU	7–0	11–2	**Won** Poinsettia Bowl
2012	No. 18 Boise State	7–1	11–2	**Won** Maaco Bowl Las Vegas
2012	Fresno State	7–1	9–4	Lost Hawaii Bowl
2012	San Diego State	7–1	9–4	Lost Poinsettia Bowl
Total	18 bowl games			11 wins, 7 losses

Final AP Poll rankings shown.

=== Mountain West Conference Championship Game (2013–present) ===
Below are the results from all Mountain West Conference Football Championship Games played. The winning team appears in bold font, on a background of their primary team color. Rankings are from the AP Poll released prior to the game.

Year	West		Mountain		Site	Attendance	MVP
2013	24 **Fresno State**	**24**	Utah State	17	Bulldog Stadium • Fresno, CA	31,362	QB Derek Carr, Fresno State
2014	Fresno State	14	22 **Boise State**	**28**	Albertsons Stadium • Boise, ID	26,101	Offensive: QB Grant Hedrick, Boise State; Defensive: MLB Tanner Vallejo, Boise State
2015	**San Diego State**	**27**	Air Force	24	Qualcomm Stadium • San Diego, CA	20,959	Offensive: QB Christian Chapman, San Diego State; Defensive: S Na'im McGee, San Diego State
2016	**San Diego State**	**27**	Wyoming	24	War Memorial Stadium • Laramie, WY	24,001	Offensive: RB Rashaad Penny, San Diego State; Defensive: S Damontae Kazee, San Diego State
2017	25 Fresno State	14	**Boise State**	**17**	Albertsons Stadium • Boise, ID	24,515	Offensive: QB Brett Rypien, Boise State; Defensive: LB Leighton Vander Esch, Boise State
2018	25 **Fresno State**	**19**	19 Boise State	16^{OT}	Albertsons Stadium • Boise, ID	23,662	Offensive: RB Alexander Mattison, Boise State; Defensive: DE Mykal Walker, Fresno State
2019	Hawaii	10	19 **Boise State**	**31**	Albertsons Stadium • Boise, ID	23,561	Offensive: QB Jaylon Henderson, Boise State; Defensive: DT Sonatane Lui, Boise State
Year	No. 1 seed		No. 2 seed		Site	Attendance	MVP
2020	25 **San Jose State**	**34**	Boise State	20	Sam Boyd Stadium • Whitney, NV	0†	Offensive: QB Nick Starkel, San Jose State; Defensive: DE Cade Hall, San Jose State
Year	West		Mountain		Site	Attendance	MVP
2021	19 San Diego State	13	**Utah State**	**46**	Dignity Health Sports Park • Carson, CA	13,445	Offensive: QB Logan Bonner, Utah State; Defensive: DE Byron Vaughns, Utah State
2022	**Fresno State**	**28**	Boise State	16	Albertsons Stadium • Boise, ID	24,037	Offensive: QB Jake Haener, Fresno State; Defensive: DB Cam Lockridge, Fresno State
Year	No. 1 seed		No. 2 seed		Site	Attendance	MVP
2023	UNLV	20	**Boise State**	**44**	Allegiant Stadium • Paradise, NV	31,473	Offensive: Taylen Green, Boise State; Defensive: Alexander Teubner, Boise State
2024	10 **Boise State**	**21**	19 UNLV	7	Albertsons Stadium • Boise, ID	36,663	Offensive: Ashton Jeanty, Boise State; Defensive: Seyi Oladipo, Boise State
2025	**Boise State**	**38**	UNLV	21	Albertsons Stadium • Boise, ID	27,152	Offensive: Maddux Madsen, Boise State; Defensive: Ty Benefield, Boise State
2026	New Mexico						

† Due to the COVID-19 pandemic, the 2020 game was played behind closed doors without fans.

=== Results by team ===
==== Current members ====
Games	School	W	L	Pct	Titles	Runners-up
3	UNLV	0	3	.000		2023, 2024, 2025
1	San Jose State	1	0	1.000	2020	
1	Air Force	0	1	.000		2015
1	Wyoming	0	1	.000		2016
1	Hawaii	0	1	.000		2019
1	New Mexico	0	0			
0	Nevada	0	0			
0	North Dakota State	0	0			
0	Northern Illinois	0	0			
0	UTEP	0	0			

==== Former members ====
App.	School	Wins	Loss.	Pct.	Year(s) Won	Year(s) Lost
9	Boise State	6	3	.667	2014, 2017, 2019, 2023, 2024, 2025	2018, 2020, 2022
5	Fresno State	3	2	.600	2013, 2018, 2022	2014, 2017
3	San Diego State	2	1	.667	2015, 2016	2021
2	Utah State	1	1	.500	2021	2013

=== Rematches ===
The Mountain West Conference Football Championship game has featured a rematch of a regular-season game a total of eight times (2014, 2016, 2017, 2018, 2019, 2022, 2024, 2025). The team which won the regular-season game is 4-4 in the rematches, winning in 2014, 2019, 2024, and 2025 but losing in 2016, 2017, 2018, 2022.

=== No results by team ===
School
Colorado State

- Nevada, North Dakota State, Northern Illinois, and UTEP have yet to appear in a Mountain West Championship Game.
- Colorado State did not make an appearance in a Mountain West Conference Championship Game while a member of the conference.

== Selection criteria ==
The Tiebreaking procedures for both selection for the Championship game and determination of the host for the 2023 Season are as follows.

=== Two-team tiebreaker procedure ===
1. Head-to-head record between the tied teams
2. Highest College Football Playoff (CFP) Selection Committee Ranking (or composite of selected computer rankings). If one or both teams are ranked in the Nov 21, 2023 CFP Rankings and win in the final weekend of regular season play, the CFP Rankings will serve at the tiebreaker. If no team is both ranked in the Nov 21 CFP rankings and wins in the final weekend then, "a composite average of selected computer rankings" will serve as the tiebreaker.
3. Overall winning percentage against all opponents. (max one FCS win will be counted)
4. Record against the next highest-placed team in the Conference Standings
5. Winning percentage against common conference opponents.
6. Coin toss

=== Three or more-team tiebreaker procedure ===
This procedure is used until two teams remain tied, then the two-team tiebreaker procedures will be used.

1. Head-to-head winning percentage among the tied teams. If within the mini round-robin of tied teams, any of the tied teams did not play each other, the group of teams shall remain tied, unless one team defeated all other tied teams.
2. Highest College Football Playoff (CFP) Selection Committee Ranking (or composite of selected computer rankings). If one or both teams are ranked in the Nov 21, 2023 CFP Rankings and win in the final weekend of regular season play, the CFP Rankings will serve at the tiebreaker. If no team is both ranked in the Nov 21 CFP rankings and wins in the final weekend then, "a composite average of selected computer rankings" will serve as the tiebreaker.
3. Overall winning percentage against all opponents. (max one FCS win will be counted)
4. Record against the next highest-placed team in the Conference Standings
5. Winning percentage against common conference opponents.
6. Drawing to be conducted virtually by the commissioner to determine the two teams.

Once the tie is reduced to two teams, then the two-team tiebreaker is used.

== Host determination ==
=== Current procedure ===
The team with the best conference record hosts the championship game. The tiebreaker procedure for determining which teams are selected for the championship game also serves as the tiebreaking procedure for determining who is the host.

=== 2018–2022 procedure ===
The team with the best conference record hosts the championship game. Before 2023, the division champion with the better conference record hosted the game. If the teams have the same record, the following tie-breaking procedure is used:

1. Head-to-head record
2. Higher College Football Playoff ranking going into the final week of regular season, excluding teams who are not ranked and/or that lost their final regular season game
3. Composite of selected computer rankings
4. Record versus common conference opponents
5. Highest overall winning percentage (conference and non-conference excluding exempt games)
6. Coin toss

=== 2013–2017 procedure ===
From 2013 to 2017, the division champion with the higher College Football Playoff ranking going into the final week of regular season was designated as the host school unless it lost its final regular season game. If the latter occurred, or neither team was ranked in the latest available College Football Playoff rankings, then the following procedure was used:

1. Team with better composite ranking among selected computer rankings
2. Head-to-head record
3. Record versus common conference opponents
4. Winning percentage against the next-highest placed common conference opponent and proceeding through the conference, with placing based on:
  1. Placement within the division
  2. Overall conference record
  3. Composite of selected computer rankings
5. Coin toss

This procedure was discontinued after the 2017 Mountain West Conference Football Championship Game after Boise State was selected to host the game despite having the same conference record as their opponent Fresno State and losing to Fresno State during the regular season.

== Game records ==
Team	Record, Team vs. Opponent	Year
Most points scored (one team)	46, Utah State vs. San Diego State	2021
Most points scored (losing team)	24, Air Force vs. San Diego State; Wyoming vs. San Diego State	2015; 2016
Fewest points scored (winning team)	17, Boise State vs. Fresno State	2017
Fewest points scored	7, UNLV vs. Boise State	2024
Most points scored (both teams)	64, Boise State (44) vs. UNLV (20)	2023
Fewest points scored (both teams)	28, Boise State (21) vs. UNLV (7)	2024
Most points scored in a half	32, Utah State (2nd half) vs. San Diego State	2021
Most points scored in a half (both teams)	48, Boise State vs. UNLV (1st half)	2023
Largest margin of victory	33, Utah State (46) vs. San Diego State (13)	2021
Smallest margin of victory	3, San Diego State (27) vs. Air Force (24); San Diego State (27) vs. Wyoming (24); Boise State (17) vs. Fresno State (14); Fresno State (19) vs. Boise State (16)	2015; 2016; 2017; 2018
Total yards	527, Boise State (226 passing, 301 rushing) vs. UNLV	2023
Rushing yards	305, Air Force vs. San Diego State	2015
Passing yards	453, San Jose State vs. Boise State	2020
First downs	26, San Jose State vs. Boise State	2020
Fewest yards allowed	258, San Jose State vs. Boise State (221 passing, 37 rushing)	2020
Fewest rushing yards allowed	37, San Jose State vs. Boise State	2020
Fewest passing yards allowed	35, San Diego State vs. Air Force	2015
Individual	Record, Player, Team vs. Opponent	Year
Total offense	437, Nick Starkel, San Jose State vs. Boise State	2020
Touchdowns (all-purpose)	4, shared by: Logan Bonner, Utah State vs. San Diego State; Taylen Green, Boise State vs. UNLV	2021, 2023
Rushing yards	209, Ashton Jeanty, Boise State vs. UNLV	2024
Rushing touchdowns	3, Timothy McVey, Air Force vs. San Diego State	2015
Passing yards	453, Nick Starkel, San Jose State vs. Boise State	2020
Passing touchdowns	4, Logan Bonner, Utah State vs. San Diego State	2021
Receiving yards	168, Davante Adams, Fresno State vs. Utah State	2013
Receiving touchdowns	2, Brandon Bowling, Utah State vs. San Diego State	2021
Tackles	16, Leighton Vander Esch, Boise State vs. Fresno State	2017
Sacks	2, shared by eight players, most recent: Marco Notarainni, Boise State vs. UNLV	2024
Interceptions	2, shared by: Brian Suite, Utah State vs. Fresno State; Damontae Kazee, San Diego State vs. Wyoming	2013; 2016
Long Plays	Record, Player, Team vs. Opponent	Year
Touchdown run	75, Ashton Jeanty, Boise State vs. UNLV	2024
Touchdown pass	58, Brandon Bowling from Logan Bonner, Utah State vs. San Diego State	2021
Kickoff return	75, Rashaad Penny, San Diego State vs. Wyoming	2016
Punt return	69, Avery Williams, Boise State vs. San Jose State	2020
Interception return	63, Tanner Vallejo, Boise State vs. Fresno State	2014
Fumble return	86, Jake Doughty, Utah State vs. Fresno State	2013
Punt	75, Tanner Blain, San Diego State vs. Wyoming	2016
Field goal	51, shared by: Jonah Dalmas, Boise State vs. San Jose State; Jose Pizano, UNLV vs. Boise State	2020, 2023
Miscellaneous	Record, Team vs. Team	Year
Game attendance	36,663, UNLV vs. Boise State	2024

== See also ==
- List of NCAA Division I FBS conference championship games
