= Hajj-Malik Williams =

American football player (born 1999)

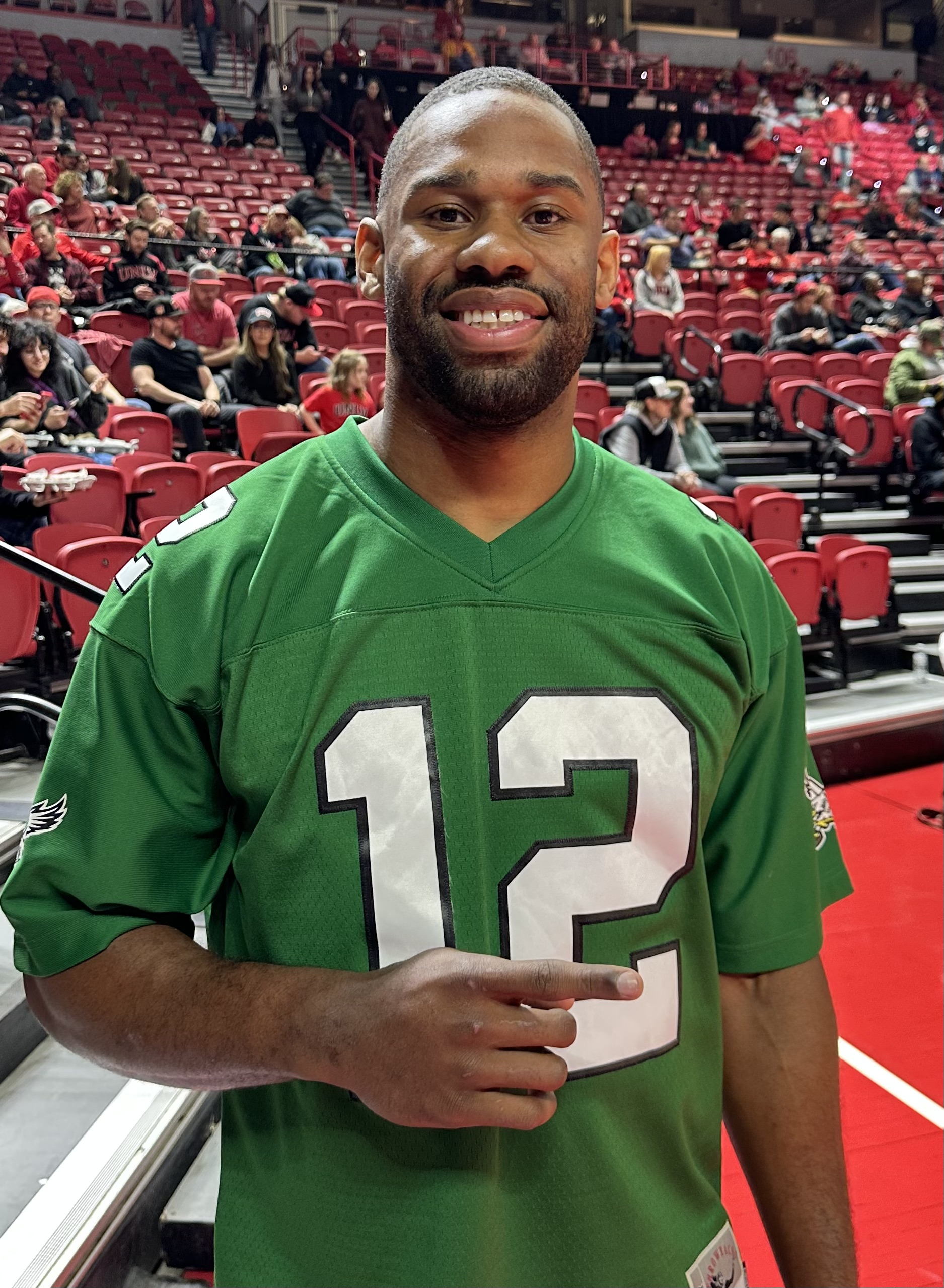
- Williams in 2024

No. 1
- Position: Quarterback

Personal information
- Born: November 25, 1999 (age 26); Atlanta, Georgia, U.S.
- Listed height: 6 ft 0 in (1.83 m)
- Listed weight: 208 lb (94 kg)

Career information
- High school: Hapeville Charter (Atlanta); USMAPS (West Point, New York)
- College: Campbell (2019–2023); UNLV (2024)
- NFL draft: 2025: undrafted

Career history
- Ottawa Redblacks (2025)*
- * Offseason or practice squad member only

Awards and highlights
- Second-team All-MW (2024)

Hajj-Malik Qaadir Williams (born November 25, 1999) is an American professional football quarterback. He played college football for the Campbell Fighting Camels and UNLV Rebels.

== Early life ==
As a young child, Williams played both soccer and football.

Over the course of his high school career he emerged into an all-region quarterback at Hapeville Charter. Following his high school career, Williams accepted an offer to attend the U.S. Military Academy prep school even after receiving a late offer from Georgia Tech.

== College career ==
=== Campbell ===
On November 29, 2023, Williams entered the transfer portal. He left as the school's leader in career passing yards and touchdowns.

=== UNLV ===
Prior to the 2024 season, Williams transferred to UNLV for his final year of eligibility. During the offseason, Williams lost a close position battle to fellow transfer Matthew Sluka. After a disagreement over NIL, Sluka opted to redshirt for the season giving Williams a chance to start. In his first game as a starter, Williams led the Rebels to a 59–14 rout of the Fresno State Bulldogs. He finished the game passing for 182 yards and three touchdowns while picking up another 119 rushing yards and 1 rushing touchdown. After a strong regular season, Williams struggled in the postseason; Williams completed a combined 18 passes on 46 attempts during UNLV's loss during the Mountain West Championship and victory in the 2024 LA Bowl.

=== College statistics ===
Year	Team	Games			Passing								Rushing					Receiving			
Year	Team	GP	GS	Record	Cmp	Att	Pct	Yds	Avg	TD	Int	Rat	Att	Yds	Avg	Lng	TD	Rec	Yds	Lng	TD
2019	Campbell	11	11	6–5	147	260	56.5	2,022	7.8	17	9	136.5	151	664	4.4	41	9	1	23	23	1
2020	Campbell	4	4	0–4	53	99	53.5	662	6.7	3	3	113.6	54	209	3.9	18	4	1	26	26	1
2021	Campbell	4	4	1–3	51	95	53.7	691	7.3	7	1	137.0	36	127	3.5	18	0	—	—	—	—
2022	Campbell	10	10	5–5	180	289	62.3	2,221	7.7	12	5	137.1	86	325	3.8	35	5	—	—	—	—
2023	Campbell	11	11	5–6	232	329	70.5	2,604	7.9	19	8	151.2	90	265	2.9	39	5	1	24	24	1
2024	UNLV	13	11	8–3	150	252	69.5	1,941	7.7	19	5	145.1	161	851	5.3	71	9	—	—	—	—
Career		52	50	25–26	813	1,324	61.4	10,141	7.7	77	31	140.3	578	2,441	4.2	71	32	3	73	26	3

== Professional career ==
Pre-draft measurables
Height	Weight	Arm length	Hand span	40-yard dash	10-yard split	20-yard split	20-yard shuttle	Three-cone drill	Vertical jump	Broad jump
6 ft 0 1/8 in (1.83 m)	208 lb (94 kg)	31 1/2 in (0.80 m)	9 3/4 in (0.25 m)	4.58 s	1.63 s	2.69 s	4.45 s	7.39 s	32.0 in (0.81 m)	9 ft 9 in (2.97 m)
All values from Pro Day

After going undrafted in the 2025 NFL draft, Williams was invited to rookie minicamp with the Las Vegas Raiders on a tryout basis. In September 2025, Williams signed a practice roster agreement with the Ottawa Redblacks of the CFL but was released after two weeks. On December 2, he signed a futures contract with the Redblacks for the 2026 season.

On May 11, 2026, Williams was released by the Redblacks.
