= Fisher Camac =

American football player

No. 14 – Virginia Cavaliers
- Position: Defensive end
- Class: Senior

Personal information
- Listed height: 6 ft 7 in (2.01 m)
- Listed weight: 248 lb (112 kg)

Career information
- High school: Highland (Gilbert, Arizona)
- College: UNLV (2022–2024); Virginia (2025–present)
- Stats at ESPN

Fisher Camac is an American college football defensive end for the Virginia Cavaliers. He previously played for the UNLV Rebels.

== Early life ==
Camac attended Highland High School in Gilbert, Arizona. As a senior, he totaled 6.5 sacks and two interceptions, leading Gilbert to a state championship. Following his high school career, Camac committed to play college football at the University of Nevada, Las Vegas.

== College career ==
Camac redshirted in 2022 and played in just eight games in 2023, totaling five tackles and a sack. His production increased in 2024, earning a starting role in the Rebels' defense. In the 2024 LA Bowl against California, Camac recorded three sacks and a forced fumble. He finished the 2024 season tallying 46 tackles, 7.5 sacks, and a forced fumble. Following the season, Camac transferred to the University of Virginia. He earned a starting position with the Cavaliers in 2025, being named the Atlantic Coast Conference Defensive Lineman of the Week after registering six tackles, two sacks, and 2.5 tackles-for-loss in a win against Duke.
