= 2024 Mountain West Conference Football Championship Game =

2024 Old Trapper Mountain West Conference Football Championship Game
- Conference Championship
UNLV Rebels	Boise State Broncos
(10–2)	(11–1)
7	21
Head coach: Barry Odom	Head coach: Spencer Danielson
AP / Coaches / CFP; 19 / 19 / 20	AP / Coaches / CFP; 10 / 10 / 10
	1	2	3	4	Total
UNLV	0	0	0	7	7
Boise State	7	14	0	0	21
- Date: December 6, 2024
- Season: 2024
- Stadium: Albertsons Stadium
- Location: Boise, Idaho
- MVP: Offensive: Ashton Jeanty (RB, Boise State); Defensive: Seyi Oladipo (S, Boise State)
- Referee: Christian Watson
- Attendance: 36,663

United States TV coverage
- Network: Fox; Gridiron Radio
- Announcers: Jason Benetti, Brock Huard, and Allison Williams (Fox); Chris Sylvester and Jared Petrino (Gridiron Radio)

2024 Mountain West Conference football standings
	Conf.			Overall
Team	W		L	W		L
No. 8 Boise State y$^	7	–	0	12	–	2
No. 23 UNLV y	6	–	1	11	–	3
Colorado State	6	–	1	8	–	5
Fresno State	4	–	3	6	–	7
San Jose State	3	–	4	7	–	6
Air Force	3	–	4	5	–	7
Hawaii	3	–	4	5	–	7
New Mexico	3	–	4	5	–	7
Utah State	3	–	4	4	–	8
San Diego State	2	–	5	3	–	9
Wyoming	2	–	5	3	–	9
Nevada	0	–	7	3	–	10
Championship: Boise State 21, UNLV 7
^ – College Football Playoff participant; $ – Conference champion; y – Championship game participant; Rankings from AP Poll

The 2024 Mountain West Conference Football Championship Game (officially known as the 2024 Old Trapper Mountain West Conference Football Championship Game for sponsorship reasons) was a college football game played on December 6, 2024, at Albertsons Stadium in Boise, Idaho. The 12th edition of the Mountain West Conference Football Championship Game determined the champion of the Mountain West Conference (MW) for the 2024 season. The game began at 6:00 p.m. MT and aired on Fox. The game featured the Boise State Broncos and the UNLV Rebels in a rematch of the previous season's championship game. Boise State won 21–7.

== Teams ==
This was the fourteenth meeting between UNLV and Boise State; the Broncos entered the game leading the all-time series 10–3.

=== Boise State Broncos ===
The Broncos entered the game with a 11–1 record, 7–0 in conference play. They made their third consecutive Mountain West title game appearance and seventh overall. They were 4–3 in previous appearances in the MW Championship game, having last won the title a year ago. Ranked 10th in the College Football Playoff rankings, a victory would presumably clinch a berth in the 2024 CFP.

=== UNLV Rebels ===
The Rebels entered the game with a 10–2 record, 6–1 in conference play. They made their second consecutive MW and second overall title game appearance, having lost the title a year ago to the Broncos. They attempted to win their first-ever MW championship and their first conference title overall since winning a share of the Big West Conference in 1994.

== Scoring summary ==
2024 Mountain West Championship
No. 20 UNLV Rebels (10–2, 6–1) vs. No. 10 Boise State (11–1, 7–0)

Quarter	1	2	3	4	Total
No. 20 UNLV	0	0	0	7	7
No. 10 Boise State	7	14	0	0	21

at Albertsons Stadium • Boise, ID

- Date: Friday, December 6, 2024
- Game time: 5:00 p.m. PST
- Game weather: Temperature: 27 °F (−3 °C) • Wind: WNW at 6 miles per hour (9.7 km/h) • Weather: Foggy
- Game attendance: 36,663
- Referee: Christian Watson
- TV announcers (FOX): Jason Benetti, Brock Huard, and Allison Williams (Fox)
  Chris Sylvester and Jared Petrino (Gridiron Radio)

Game information

First Quarter

- (3:51) BSU – Latrell Caples 22 yard pass from Maddux Madsen, Jonah Dalmas kick (Drive: 4 plays, 55 yards, 2:33; Boise State 7–0)

Second Quarter

- (2:40) BSU – Maddux Madsen 14 yard run, Jonah Dalmas kick (Drive: 12 plays, 69 yards, 6:33; Boise State 14–0)
- (0:29) BSU – Ashton Jeanty 75 yard run, Jonah Dalmas kick (Drive: 2 plays, 80 yards, 0:47; Boise State 21–0)

Third Quarter

No scoring plays

Fourth Quarter

- (9:06) UNLV – Greg Burrell 31 yard run, Caden Chittenden kick (Drive: 9 plays, 81 yards, 3:30; Boise State 21–7)

Statistics	UNLV	BSU
First downs	13	19
Plays–yards	63–327	64–373
Rushes–yards	35–217	37–215
Passing yards	110	158
Passing: comp–att–int	13–28–1	18–27–0
Time of possession	27:46	32:14

Team	Category	Player	Statistics
UNLV	Passing	Hajj-Malik Williams	13/28, 110 yards, INT
UNLV	Rushing	Kylin James	2 carries, 95 yards
UNLV	Receiving	Corey Thompson Jr.	2 receptions, 32 yards
Boise State	Passing	Maddux Madsen	18/27, 158 yards, TD
Boise State	Rushing	Ashton Jeanty	32 carries, 209 yards, TD
Boise State	Receiving	Matt Lauter	5 receptions, 62 yards
