= Matthew Sluka =

American football player

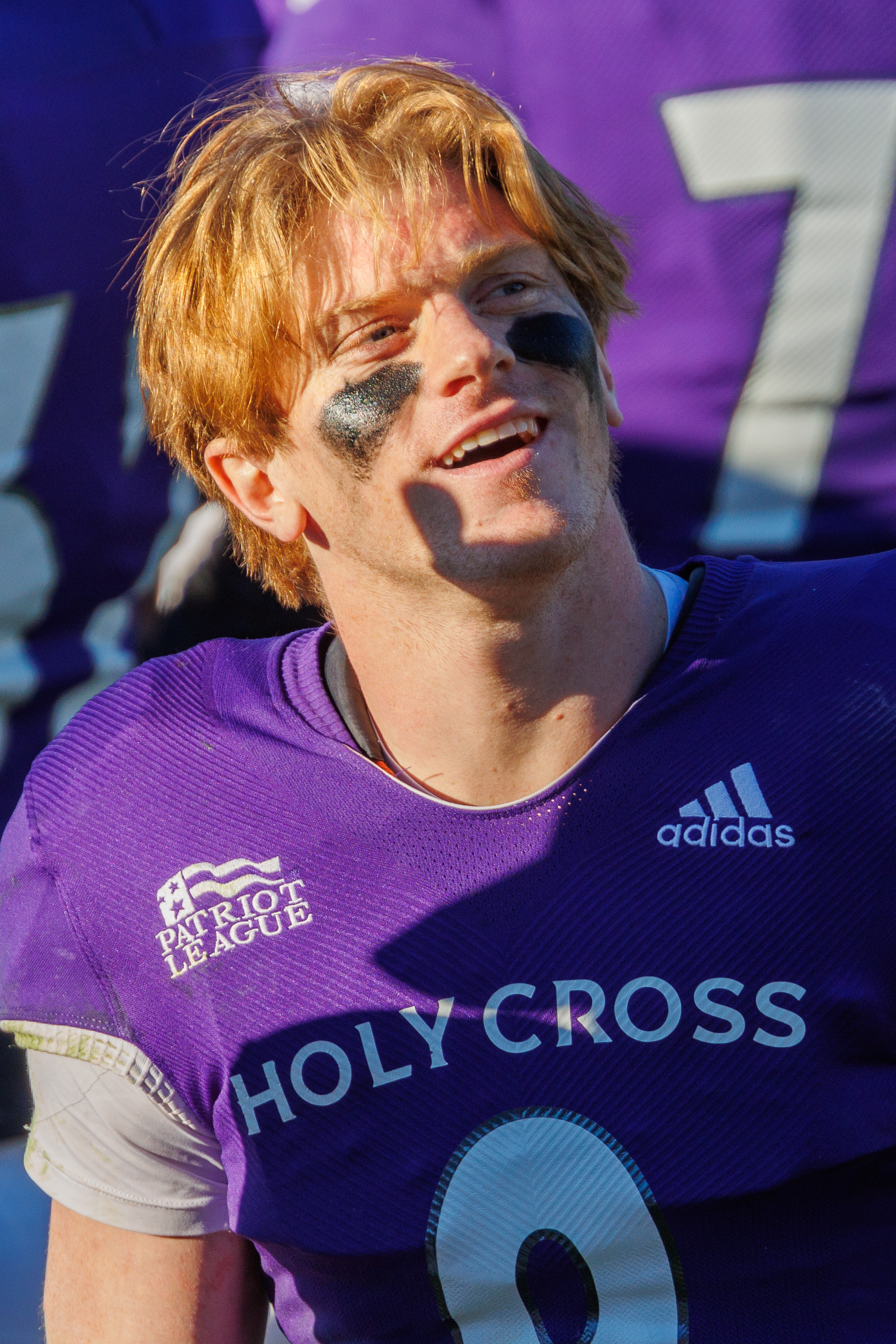
- Sluka in 2023

Profile
- Position: Quarterback

Personal information
- Listed height: 6 ft 2 in (1.88 m)
- Listed weight: 216 lb (98 kg)

Career information
- High school: Kellenberg Memorial (Uniondale, New York); Peddie School (Hightstown, New Jersey)
- College: Holy Cross (2020–2023); UNLV (2024); James Madison (2025)
- NFL draft: 2026: undrafted

Awards and highlights
- Third-team FCS All-American (2023); Patriot League Offensive Player of the Year (2023); 2× First-team All-Patriot League (2022, 2023); Second-team All-Patriot League (2021); Patriot League Rookie of the Year (2020)
- Stats at ESPN

Matthew Sluka is an American football quarterback. He played college football for the Holy Cross Crusaders, UNLV Rebels, and James Madison Dukes.

== Early life ==
Sluka grew up in Locust Valley, New York and attended Kellenberg Memorial High School, where he played football, lacrosse, and basketball. As a junior, he passed for 984 yards and 10 touchdowns, while also rushing for 1,619 yards and 24 touchdowns as Kellenberg went undefeated. He was named Class A 2nd team all-state quarterback by the New York State Sportswriters Association. As a senior, Sluka led the Firebirds to a second straight undefeated season, completing 74 of 101 pass attempts for 1,203 yards and 14 touchdowns and rushing for 1,131 yards and 22 touchdowns. He was named Class A 1st team all-state quarterback by the NYSSWA.

Although Sluka was recruited to play college lacrosse by several high-level NCAA Division I programs, he enrolled at the Peddie School for a postgraduate year in hopes of being recruited to play college football.

== College career ==
=== Holy Cross ===
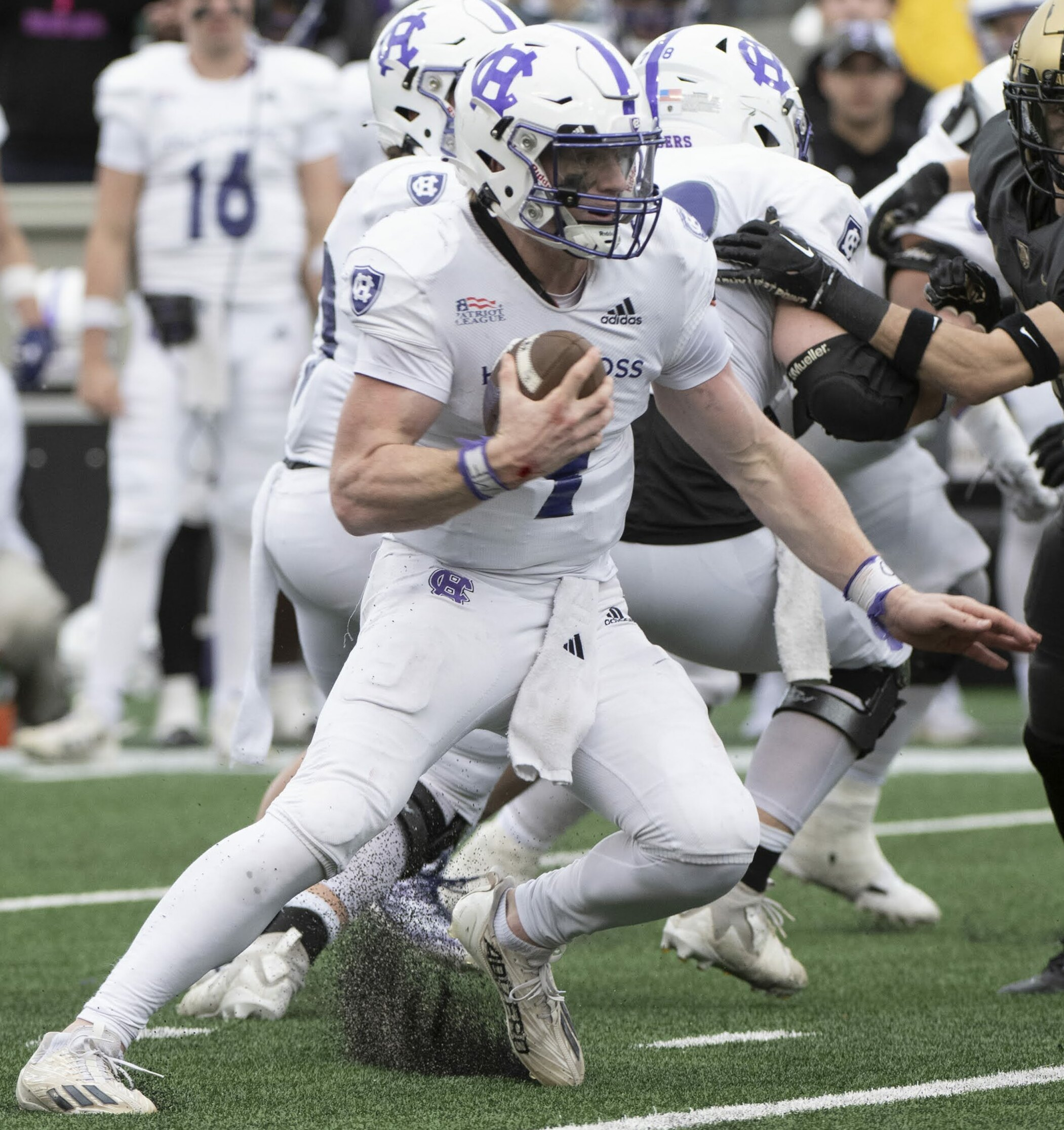
Sluka with Holy Cross in 2023

Sluka was named the Crusaders' starting quarterback going into his freshman season at Holy Cross, which was postponed from the fall to the spring of 2021 due to COVID-19. He was named the Patriot League Rookie of the Year after passing for 187 yards and two touchdowns while also rushing for 268 yards and four touchdowns in four games. Sluka was named second-team All-Patriot League after passing for 1,512 yards and 11 touchdowns and rushing for 868 yards and 14 touchdowns during his sophomore season.

Sluka was named first team All-Patriot League as a junior after he completed 153 of 266 pass attempts for 2,489 yards with 26 touchdowns and four interceptions and rushed 203 times for 1,234 yards, which was the most among FCS quarterbacks, and 11 touchdowns and was a finalist for the Walter Payton Award. He passed for 238 and three touchdowns, including one a 46-yard Hail Mary pass as time expired, and rushed for 146 yards in the Crusaders' 37–31 upset win over FBS Buffalo. Sluka rushed for a career-high 213 yards and one touchdown and also passed for 125 yards in Holy Cross's 42–21 loss to eventual champion South Dakota State in the 2022 FCS quarterfinal.

Sluka entered his senior season as a preseason All-American and on the watchlist for the Walter Payton Award. He set a Division I single-game record for rushing yards by a quarterback with 330 yards on 28 carries and rushed for three touchdowns in a 38–35 loss to Lafayette on October 21, 2023. Sluka was named the Patriot League Offensive Player of the Year after passing for 1,728 yards and 20 touchdowns with five interceptions and rushing for 1,247 yards and nine touchdowns. He entered the transfer portal on November 20, 2023. Sluka passed for 5,916 yards and 59 touchdowns, while rushing for 3,583 yards and 38 touchdowns during his four seasons at Holy Cross.

=== UNLV ===
Sluka ultimately transferred to UNLV. He was named the Rebels' starting quarterback prior to the team's season opener against Houston. UNLV defeated Houston 27–7 in their 2024 season opener, with Sluka throwing for 71 yards and two touchdowns in his Rebels debut. In week 3, Sluka led UNLV to its first 3–0 start since the 1984 season in a 23–20 win over Kansas. He ran for 124 yards and threw for 86 yards and a touchdown.

On September 25, 2024, Sluka announced on social media he would redshirt and not play in any of the Rebels' remaining games during the 2024 season. He stated that he committed to UNLV based on certain representations that were made to him, and said they were not upheld after he enrolled. This would mark the first time (at least publicly) that a player elected to take a redshirt and transfer in-season due to the player's claim of unsigned, unwritten, and unenforceable name, image, and likeness compensation (NIL) agreements not being met. UNLV denied that any offers outside of a $3,000 payment for relocation were made.

In three games with UNLV, Sluka completed 21 of 48 passes for 318 yards and six touchdowns with an interception and rushed for 253 yards and one touchdown.

=== James Madison ===
On January 14, 2025, James Madison University announced on their social media platforms that Sluka had signed a letter of intent to play for the Dukes in 2025. In his final college season Sluka appeared in eight games, all off the bench, and completed eight of 11 pass attempts for 100 yards with three touchdowns and two interceptions while also rushing for 239 yards and three touchdowns on 42 carries.

=== Statistics ===
Season	Team	Games			Passing								Rushing			
Season	Team	GP	GS	Record	Cmp	Att	Pct	Yds	Avg	TD	INT	Rtg	Att	Yds	Avg	TD
2020	Holy Cross	4	2	1–1	20	35	57.1	187	5.3	2	1	115.2	44	234	5.3	4
2021	Holy Cross	13	13	10–3	117	208	56.3	1,495	7.2	11	5	129.3	166	868	5.2	14
2022	Holy Cross	13	13	12–1	153	266	57.5	2,491	9.4	26	4	165.4	203	1,234	6.1	11
2023	Holy Cross	11	9	5–4	123	199	61.8	1,728	8.7	20	5	162.9	186	1,247	6.7	9
2024	UNLV	3	3	3–0	21	48	43.8	318	6.6	6	1	136.5	39	253	6.5	1
2025	James Madison	8	0	—	8	11	72.7	100	9.1	3	2	202.7	42	239	5.7	3
Career		54	40	31–9	442	767	57.6	6,319	8.4	68	18	151.1	680	4,075	5.9	43

== Professional career ==
After going unselected in the 2026 NFL draft, Sluka took part in a rookie minicamp with the New York Giants on a tryout basis but was not offered a contract. The Saskatchewan Roughriders of the Canadian Football League added him to their negotiation list, but did not sign him.
