= Seyi Oladipo =

American football player (born 2003)

No. 35 – Saskatchewan Roughriders
- Position: Defensive back
- Roster status: Active
- CFL status: American

Personal information
- Born: March 18, 2003 (age 23); Centennial, Colorado, U.S.
- Listed height: 6 ft 0 in (1.83 m)
- Listed weight: 210 lb (95 kg)

Career information
- High school: Eaglecrest (Aurora, Colorado)
- College: Boise State (2021–2024)
- NFL draft: 2025: undrafted

Career history
- Saskatchewan Roughriders (2025–present)

Awards and highlights
- Second-team All-MW (2024)
- Stats at CFL.ca

Seyi Oladipo Jr. (born March 18, 2003) is an American professional football defensive back for the Saskatchewan Roughriders of the Canadian Football League (CFL). He played college football for the Boise State Broncos.

== Early life ==
Oladipo was born on March 18, 2003, in Centennial, Colorado. He attended Eaglecrest High School in Aurora, Colorado and played basketball and football. As a junior, Oladipo was named first-team all-state and was a three-star recruit when he committed to play college football at Boise State University.

== College career ==
Oladipo played college football for the Boise State Broncos from 2021 to 2024. He played in 54 games, starting 21, where he made 186 tackles, including 21.5 for loss, eight sacks, four interceptions, including one for a touchdown, 15 pass breakups, two forced fumbles and one fumble recovery. Oladipo was the 2024 Mountain West Championship Defensive MVP, recording 10 tackles, with two tackles for loss, one sack and one forced fumble. He was named to the second-team All-Mountain West team in 2024.

== Professional career ==
Pre-draft measurables
Height	Weight	Arm length	Hand span	Wingspan	40-yard dash	10-yard split	20-yard split	20-yard shuttle	Three-cone drill	Vertical jump	Broad jump	Bench press
5 ft 11 in (1.80 m)	209 lb (95 kg)	31 in (0.79 m)	9 1/2 in (0.24 m)	6 ft 2 1/8 in (1.88 m)	4.64 s	1.62 s	2.63 s	4.52 s	7.10 s	33 in (0.84 m)	10 ft 3 in (3.12 m)	19 reps
All values from Pro Day

On November 11, 2025, Oladipo signed a future/active contract with the Saskatchewan Roughriders of the Canadian Football League (CFL). On May 30, 2026, he was signed to the practice roster. Oladipo was promoted to the active roster on June 23 and made his debut against the Toronto Argonauts, where he made one tackle on special teams.
