= Jai'Den Thomas =

American football player (born 2005)

- Thomas in 2026

No. 9 – UNLV Rebels
- Position: Running back
- Class: Junior

Personal information
- Born: March 24, 2005 (age 21); Paterson, New Jersey, U.S.
- Listed height: 5 ft 9 in (1.75 m)
- Listed weight: 190 lb (86 kg)

Career information
- High school: Westlake (Atlanta, Georgia)
- College: UNLV (2023–present)

Awards and highlights
- First-team All-Mountain West (2025); Second-team All-Mountain West (2024)
- Stats at ESPN

Jai'Den Elijah Thomas (born March 24, 2005) is an American college football running back for the UNLV Rebels.

== College career ==
After attending Westlake High School in Atlanta, Georgia, Thomas committed to play college football at the University of Nevada, Las Vegas. As a true freshman, he rushed for 503 yards and 12 touchdowns. The following season, Thomas recorded 918 rushing yards and seven touchdowns, helping lead the Rebels to their first bowl victory in 24 seasons. He entered the 2025 season with high expectations from the media. In the 2025 season opener against Idaho State, Thomas ran for 147 yards and three touchdowns in a 38–31 victory.

=== Statistics ===
College statistics
Season	Team	Games	Rushing				Receiving			
Season	Team	GP	Att	Yards	Avg	TD	Rec	Yards	Avg	TD
2023	UNLV	13	108	503	4.7	12	7	62	8.9	0
2024	UNLV	14	164	918	5.6	7	11	91	8.3	1
2025	UNLV	13	148	1,036	7.0	12	39	237	6.1	1
Career		40	420	2,457	5.9	31	57	390	6.8	2
