= 2024 Boise State Broncos football team =

American college football season

2024 Boise State Broncos football

Mountain West champion

MW Championship Game, W 21–7 vs. UNLV

Fiesta Bowl (CFP Quarterfinal), L 14–31 vs. Penn State
- Conference: Mountain West Conference

Ranking
- Coaches: No. 9
- AP: No. 8
- Record: 12–2 (7–0 MW)
- Head coach: Spencer Danielson (1st season)
- Offensive coordinator: Dirk Koetter (1st season)
- Co-offensive coordinator: Nate Potter (1st season)
- Offensive scheme: Pro spread
- Defensive coordinator: Erik Chinander (1st season)
- Co-defensive coordinator: Tyler Stockton (1st season)
- Base defense: 4–2–5
- Home stadium: Albertsons Stadium

Uniform
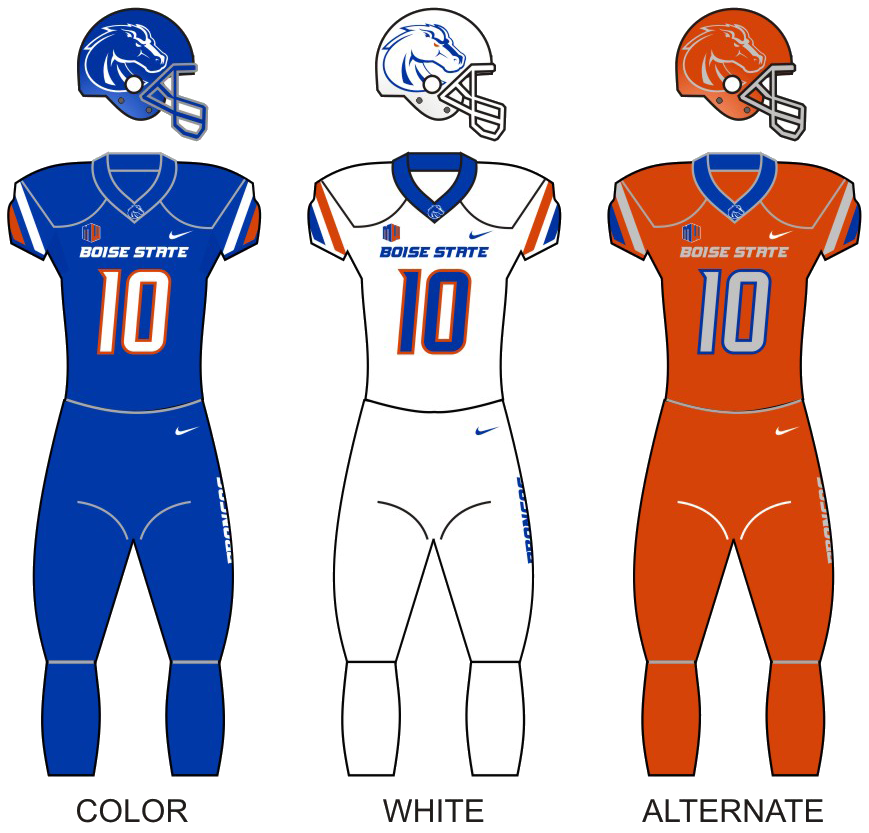

2024 Mountain West Conference football standings
	Conf.			Overall
Team	W		L	W		L
No. 8 Boise State y$^	7	–	0	12	–	2
No. 23 UNLV y	6	–	1	11	–	3
Colorado State	6	–	1	8	–	5
Fresno State	4	–	3	6	–	7
San Jose State	3	–	4	7	–	6
Air Force	3	–	4	5	–	7
Hawaii	3	–	4	5	–	7
New Mexico	3	–	4	5	–	7
Utah State	3	–	4	4	–	8
San Diego State	2	–	5	3	–	9
Wyoming	2	–	5	3	–	9
Nevada	0	–	7	3	–	10
Championship: Boise State 21, UNLV 7
^ – College Football Playoff participant; $ – Conference champion; y – Championship game participant; Rankings from AP Poll

The 2024 Boise State Broncos football team represented Boise State University as a member of the Mountain West Conference during the 2024 NCAA Division I FBS football season. Led by first-year head coach Spencer Danielson, the Broncos played their home games on campus at Albertsons Stadium in Boise, Idaho.

== Offseason ==
=== Transfer portal ===
Departing transfers
Name	No.	Pos.	Height	Weight	Year	Hometown	New school
Keenan McCaddy	#19	S	6’3	185	Freshman	Honolulu, Hawaii	Garden City Community College
Eric McAlister	#80	WR	6'3	195	Redshirt Freshman	Azle, Texas	TCU
Kivon Wright	#44	DE	6'3	240	Redshirt Freshman	Atlanta, Georgia	Kilgore Junior College
Taylen Green	#10	QB	6'6	221	Redshirt Sophomore	Lewisville, Texas	Arkansas
Brett Tommasini	#59	LB	6'1	230	Redshirt Sophomore	Eagle, Idaho	Carroll
Cole Wright	#83	WR	6’	179	Redshirt Junior	Carlsbad, California	UC Davis
Nikolai Bujnowski	#61	OL	6’1	305	Redshirt Sophomore	Verona, New Jersey	Kent State
Shea Whiting	#9	WR	6'2	221	Redshirt Senior	Houston, Texas	West Texas A&M
Jalen Neal	#39	CB	5’10	174	Redshirt Sophomore	Atlanta, Georgia	Rhode Island
Wyatt Redding	#45	K	6’1	196	Redshirt Freshman	Sumner, Washington	Central Washington
James Wilborn Jr	#45	DE	6'3	245	Sophomore	Flint, Michigan	Merrimack
Favor Komolafe	#75	OL	6’3	307	Sophomore	Pittsburgh, California	Georgia State
Dishawn Misa	#50	LB	6'3	234	Redshirt Freshman	Tacoma, Washington	Eastern Washington
Joshua Horn	#58	K	5’11	193	Freshman	Boise, Idaho	College of Idaho
CJ Tiller	#0	QB	6’1	200	Freshman	Gilbert, Arizona	Utah State
Rick Moore	#76	OL	6’6	300	Redshirt Junior	Los Gatos, California	Old Dominion

Incoming transfers
Name	No.	Pos.	Height	Weight	Year	Hometown	Prev. school
Jarrett Reeser	#39	K/P	5'8	215	Redshirt Sophomore	Canyon Country, California	San Diego State
Jeremiah Earby	#24	CB	6’2	181	Junior	Palo Alto, California	Cal
Cam Camper	#80	WR	6’3	203	Graduate Student	Lancaster, Texas	Indiana
Malachi Nelson	#7	QB	6’4	195	Redshirt Freshman	Los Alamitos, California	USC
Tavion Woodard	#52	DE	6’4	260	Graduate Student	West Lafayette, Indiana	Ball State
Tevin Griffey	#48	CB	5'11	180	Redshirt Senior	Orlando, Florida	Florida A&M
Jake Steele	#78	OL	6'4	306	Redshirt Sophomore	Temecula, California	San Jose State
Taren Schive	#49	K	5'10	182	Senior	Riverside, California	San Jose State
Conner Gilbreath	#89	TE	6’5	265	Senior	Redding, California	LSU
Mitchell Bothwell	#81	TE	6'5	240	Senior	Fort Worth, Texas	Villanova
Davon Banks	#6	CB	5’11	184	Junior	San Jacinto, California	Washington

== Preseason ==
=== Mountain West media poll ===
The Mountain West's preseason prediction poll was released on July 10, 2024.

Mountain West media poll
Predicted finish	Team	Votes (1st place)
1	Boise State	543 (38)
2	UNLV	471 (4)
3	Fresno State	460 (4)
4	Air Force	384
5	Colorado State	337
6	Wyoming	296
7	Utah State	285
8	San Diego State	251
9	Hawaii	214
10	San Jose State	185
11	New Mexico	85
12	Nevada	77

== Schedule ==
Date	Time	Opponent	Rank	Site	TV	Result	Attendance
August 31	2:00 p.m.	at Georgia Southern*		Paulson Stadium; Statesboro, GA	ESPNU	W 56–45	24,134
September 7	8:00 p.m.	at No. 7 Oregon*		Autzen Stadium; Eugene, OR	Peacock	L 34–37	58,134
September 21	7:45 p.m.	Portland State*		Albertsons Stadium; Boise, ID	FS1	W 56–14	36,972
September 28	8:00 p.m.	Washington State*	No. 25	Albertsons Stadium; Boise, ID	FS1	W 45–24	37,711‡
October 5	5:00 p.m.	Utah State	No. 21	Albertsons Stadium; Boise, ID	FS2	W 62–30	37,210
October 12	9:00 p.m.	at Hawaii	No. 17	Clarence T. C. Ching Athletics Complex; Honolulu, HI	CBSSN	W 28–7	15,194
October 25	8:30 p.m.	at UNLV	No. 17	Allegiant Stadium; Paradise, NV	CBSSN	W 29–24	42,228
November 1	6:00 p.m.	San Diego State	No. 15	Albertsons Stadium; Boise, ID	FS1	W 56–24	36,838
November 9	6:00 p.m.	Nevada	No. 12	Albertsons Stadium; Boise, ID (rivalry)	FOX	W 28–21	37,143
November 16	5:00 p.m.	at San Jose State	No. 13	CEFCU Stadium; San Jose, CA	CBSSN	W 42–21	20,517
November 23	5:00 p.m.	at Wyoming	No. 12	War Memorial Stadium; Laramie, WY	CBSSN	W 17–13	18,094
November 29	10:00 a.m.	Oregon State*	No. 11	Albertsons Stadium; Boise, ID	FOX	W 34–18	37,264
December 6	6:00 p.m.	No. 20 UNLV	No. 10	Albertsons Stadium; Boise, ID (MW Conference Championship Game, Big Noon Kickoff)	FOX	W 21–7	36,663
December 31	5:30 p.m.	vs. (6) No. 4 Penn State*	(3) No. 9	State Farm Stadium; Glendale, AZ (Fiesta Bowl–CFP Quarterfinal)	ESPN	L 14–31	63,854
*Non-conference game; Rankings from AP Poll (and CFP Rankings, after November 5) - Released prior to game; All times are in Mountain time

‡New Albertsons Stadium attendance record.

== Roster ==
2024 Boise State Broncos football team roster
Players
Coaches
Offense

Pos.	#	Name	Class
RB	1	Jambres Dubar	So
RB	2	Ashton Jeanty	Jr
WR	3	Latrell Caples	Sr
QB	4	Maddux Madsen	So
WR	5	Chris Marshall	Jr
QB	7	Malachi Nelson	Fr
WR	9	Cam Camper	GS
WR	13	Chase Penry	Jr
QB	14	Max Cutforth	Fr
QB	15	Colt Fulton	Jr
QB	16	Kaleb Annett	Fr
WR	17	Prince Strachan	So
WR	18	Cooper Jones	Sr
WR	19	Troy Wilkey	So
RB	24	Dylan Riley	Fr
RB	26	Sire Gaines	Fr
WR	27	Kayden Chan	Jr
FB	33	Tyler Crowe	GS
RB	37	Ethan Mikita	So
RB	40	Ryker Clinger	Fr
TE	47	Kaden Anderson	Fr
TE	48	Oliver Fisher	Fr
WR	49	A. J. Maes	Fr
OL	57	Nathan Cardona	Sr
OL	61	J. J. Talo	So
OL	62	Roger Carreon	So
OL	63	Mason Randolph	Jr
OL	64	Carson Rasmussen	Fr
OL	65	Hall Schmidt	So
OL	66	Ben Dooley	GS
OL	67	Jason Steele	Fr
OL	68	Jake Steele	So
OL	69	Tayo Omotinugbon	Fr
OL	70	Kyle Cox	Fr
OL	71	Beresford	GS
OL	72	Zach Holmes	Jr
OL	73	Parker Perkins	Fr
OL	75	Daylon Metoyer	Jr
OL	76	Greg Bienvenue	Fr
OL	77	Kage Casey	So
OL	78	Tyler Keinath	Jr
WR	80	Cameron Bates	Fr
WR	81	Austin Bolt	Sr
WR	82	Ben Ford	Jr
WR	83	Tyrone Jackson	Fr
TE	85	Matt Lauter	Jr
TE	86	Austin Terry	So
TE	87	Mitch Bothwell	Jr
TE	88	Matt Wagner	Fr
WR	89	Jackson Grier	Fr
TE	96	Luke Voorhees	Jr

Defense

Pos.	#	Name	Class
S	0	Ty Benefield	So
S	4	Rodney Robinson	Sr
DE	5	Jayden Virgin-Morgan	So
CB	6	Jeremiah Earby	Jr
CB	7	A'Marion McCoy	Sr
CB	8	Markel Reed	GS
DT	9	Sheldon Newton	GS
LB	10	Andrew Simpson	Jr
S	14	Kaonohi Kaniho	Sr
DE	15	Tyler Wegis	Sr
CB	16	Franklyn Johnson Jr.	Fr
LB	17	Clay Martineau	Fr
S	18	Gabe Tahir	Fr
CB	20	Davon Banks	Jr
S	21	Zion Washington	Jr
LB	22	Chase Martin	So
S	23	Seyi Oladipo	Sr
DE	25	Nick Hawthorne	Fr
CB	26	Khai Taylor	Fr
CB	27	Dionte Thornton	Fr
S	28	Seth Knothe	So
S	29	Milo Lopez	Sr
LB	30	Wyatt Milkovic	Fr
CB	31	Tevin Griffey	Sr
S	32	Bryce Cleave	Jr
S	34	Alexander Teubner	GS
CB	35	Treyvon Tolmaire	Fr
S	36	Cole Miller	Fr
S	38	Travis Anderson	Fr
S	39	Timothy Mitchell	Fr
LB	40	Davis Thacker	Jr
S	41	Boen Phelps	Fr
LB	43	Jake Ripp	So
LB	44	Udoka Ezeani	Jr
DE	45	Troy Grizzle	Fr
CB	47	Jacob Williams	Fr
DE	50	Joseph Marsh	So
DE	51	Roman Caywood	Fr
DE	52	Tavion Woodard	GS
OLB	53	Marco Notarainni	Jr
DE	54	Gabe Hunter	Sr
LB	55	Gavin Hambrick	So
DE	56	Mason Jacobsen	So
DT	58	Trevor McKenna	Fr
DT	59	Lopez Sanusi	Fr
DT	60	Spencer Gieg	So
DL	79	Connor Warkentin	Fr
DL	90	Braxton Fely	Jr
DE	91	Ahmed Hassanein	Sr
DT	92	Michael Callahan	GS
DE	93	Demanuel Brown Jr.	Fr
DE	95	Max Stege	So
DL	97	Hayden Hanks	Fr
DT	98	Herbert Gums	Sr
DT	99	Michael Madrie	Fr

Special teams

Pos.	#	Name	Class
K/P	30	Jarrett Reeser	So
K/P	35	Jonah Dalmas	GS
K	39	Taren Schive	Sr
LS	42	Mason Hutton	Jr
P	46	James Ferguson-Reynolds	Jr
LS	49	Ty Smith	Fr

Head coach

- Spencer Danielson

Coordinators/assistant coaches

- Stacy Collins – Assistant head coach/special teams coordinator/linebackers
- Erik Chinander – Defensive coordinator/defensive linemen
- Tyler Stockton – Co-defensive coordinator/safeties
- Dirk Koetter – Offensive coordinator/quarterbacks
- Nate Potter – Co-offensive coordinator/tight ends
- Matt Miller – Passing game coordinator/wide receivers
- Steve Cooper – Assistant to offensive coordinator & co-quarterbacks
- Derrick McMahen - Assistant to special teams coordinator & Special teams quality control
- James Montgomery – Running backs
- Demario Warren – Cornerbacks
- Jabril Frazier – Edge rushers
- Tim Keane – Offensive linemen
- Zane Busekist – Assistant defensive linemen
- Grant Miller – Offensive quality control
- Demitri Washington – Defensive quality control
- B. J. Mullin - Assistant linebackers
- Ron Collins – Defensive analyst
- D. J. Killings – Graduate assistant
- Justin Garrett – Graduate assistant
- Kooper Richardson – Graduate assistant
- Benjamin Hilgart – Director, strength and conditioning
- Brad Booth – Assistant director, strength and conditioning
- Jaylan Reid – Assistant director, strength and conditioning
- Marques White – Assistant director, strength and conditioning

Legend

- (C) Team captain
- (S) Suspended
- (I) Ineligible
- Injured
- Redshirt

Roster
Last update: 12/15/24

== Rankings ==
Ranking movements Legend: ██ Increase in ranking ██ Decrease in ranking RV = Received votes т = Tied with team above or below
	Week																
Poll	Pre	1	2	3	4	5	6	7	8	9	10	11	12	13	14	15	Final
AP	RV	RV	RV	RV	25	21	17	15	17	15	12	13	12	11	10	8	8
Coaches	RV	RV	RV	RV	RV	RV	22	19	19	19	14	13т	13	11	10	8	9
CFP	Not released										12	13	12	11	10	9	Not released

== Game summaries ==
=== at Georgia Southern ===
Boise State Broncos (0–0) at Georgia Southern Eagles (0–0) – Game summary

Quarter	1	2	3	4	Total
Broncos	14	14	8	20	56
Eagles	0	16	14	15	45

at Paulson Stadium • Statesboro, GA

- Date: August 31, 2024
- Game time: 2:00 p.m.
- Game weather: Sunny, 92 °F (33 °C)
- Game attendance: 24,134
- Referee: Trennis Livingston
- TV announcers (ESPNU): Mike Corey (play-by-play) and Rene Ingoglia (analyst)

Game information

First quarter

- (10:28) BSU – Ashton Jeanty 77-yard run, Jonah Dalmas kick (Drive: 1 play, 77 yards, 0:12; Boise State 7–0)
- (2:50) BSU – Ashton Jeanty 26-yard run, Jonah Dalmas kick (Drive: 6 plays, 71 yards, 2:17; Boise State 14–0)

Second quarter

- (13:28) GASO – Jalen White 2-yard run (Drive: 9 plays, 50 yards, 4:15; Boise State 14–6)
- (11:00) GASO – Gavin Stewart 31-yard field goal (Drive: 5 plays, 18 yards, 1:36; Boise State 14–9)
- (9:19) BSU – Ashton Jeanty 1-yard run, Jonah Dalmas kick (Drive: 5 plays, 90 yards, 1:38; Boise State 21–9)
- (2:33) BSU – Ashton Jeanty 5-yard run, Jonah Dalmas kick (Drive: 10 plays, 71 yards, 4:49; Boise State 28–9)
- (0:18) GASO – Dalen Cobb 18-yard pass from JC French, Gavin Stewart kick (Drive: 11 plays, 81 yards, 2:10; Boise State 28–16)

Third quarter

- (11:37) GASO – JC French 11-yard run, Gavin Stewart kick (Drive: 8 plays, 75 yards, 3:23; Boise State 28–23)
- (6:48) GASO – Jalen White 1-yard run, Gavin Stewart kick (Drive: 8 plays, 33 yards, 2:58; Georgia Southern 30–28)
- (1:07) BSU – Ashton Jeanty 1-yard run, Cameron Camper pass (Drive: 14 plays, 75 yards, 5:41; Boise State 36–30)

Fourth quarter

- (13:30) GASO – Beau Johnson 3-yard pass from JC French, Gavin Stewart (Drive: 5 plays, 75 yards, 2:37; Georgia Southern 37–36)
- (13:17) BSU – Ashton Jeanty 75-yard run (Drive: 1 play, 75 yards, 0:13; Boise State 42–37)
- (7:43) BSU – Sire Gaines 38-yard run, Jonah Dalmas kick (Drive: 4 plays, 86 yards, 1:59; Boise State 49–37)
- (5:42) BSU – Sire Gaines 17-yard pass from Maddux Madsen, Jonah Dalmas kick (Drive: 3 plays, 25 yards, 1:33; Boise State 56–37)
- (2:04) GASO – Jalen White 1-yard run, JC French rush (Drive: 11 plays, 65 yards, 3:38; Boise State 56–45)

Statistics	BSU	GASO
First downs	23	27
Total yards	651	461
Rushing yards	371	139
Passing yards	280	322
Passing: Comp–Att–Int	22–31–1	28–50–0
Time of possession	28:31	31:29

Team	Category	Player	Statistics
Boise State	Passing	Maddux Madsen	22/31, 280 yards, TD, INT
Boise State	Rushing	Ashton Jeanty	20 carries, 267 yards, 6 TD
Boise State	Receiving	Cameron Camper	4 receptions, 99 yards
Georgia Southern	Passing	JC French	28/50, 322 yards, 2 TD
Georgia Southern	Rushing	JC French	16 carries, 39 yards, TD
Georgia Southern	Receiving	Derwin Burgess Jr.	4 receptions, 93 yards

=== at No. 7 Oregon ===
Boise State Broncos (1–0) at No. 7 Oregon Ducks (1–0) – Game summary

Quarter	1	2	3	4	Total
Broncos	3	17	0	14	34
No. 7 Ducks	7	7	13	10	37

at Autzen Stadium • Eugene, OR

- Date: September 7, 2024
- Game time: 8:00 p.m.
- Game weather: Cloudy, 82 °F (28 °C)
- Game attendance: 58,134
- Referee: Chris Coyte
- TV announcers (Peacock): Andrew Siciliano (play-by-play), Michael Robinson (analyst), and Laura Britt (sideline)

Game information

First quarter

- (9:29) BSU – Jonah Dalmas 42-yard field goal (Drive: 7 plays, 24 yards, 3:07; Boise State 3–0)
- (4:36) ORE – Dillon Gabriel 1-yard run, Atticus Sappington kick (Drive: 3 plays, 72 yards, 0:51; Oregon 7–3)

Second quarter

- (14:20) BSU – Ashton Jeanty 3-yard run, Jonah Dalmas kick (Drive: 9 plays, 75 yards, 5:16; Boise State 10–7)
- (9:28) ORE – Evan Stewart 34-yard pass from Dillon Gabriel, Atticus Sappington kick (Drive: 1 play, 34 yards, 0:07; Oregon 14–10)
- (4:51) BSU – Cameron Camper 17-yard pass from Maddux Madsen, Jonah Dalmas kick (Drive: 3 plays, 30 yards, 1:13; Boise State 17–14)
- (0:02) BSU – Jonah Dalmas 20-yard field goal (Drive: 12 plays, 77 yards, 1:50; Boise State 20–14)

Third quarter

- (9:09) ORE – Traeshon Holden 59-yard pass from Dillon Gabriel (Drive: 5 plays, 88 yards, 3:05; Tied 20–20)
- (3:57) ORE – Tez Johnson 85-yard punt return, Atticus Sappington kick (Oregon 27–20)

Fourth quarter

- (13:09) BSU – Ashton Jeanty 70-yard run, Jonah Dalmas kick (Drive: 1 play, 70 yards, 0:10; Tied 27–27)
- (10:15) BSU – Ashton Jeanty 8-yard run, Jonah Dalmas kick (Drive: 4 plays, 22 yards, 2:01; Boise State 34–27)
- (9:59) ORE – Jayden Limar 0-yard kickoff return, Atticus Sappington kick (Tied 34–34)
- (0:00) ORE – Atticus Sappington 25-yard field goal (Drive: 11 plays, 61 yards, 3:36; Oregon 37–34)

Statistics	BSU	ORE
First downs	19	16
Total yards	369	352
Rushing yards	221	109
Passing yards	148	243
Passing: Comp–Att–Int	17–40–0	18–21–0
Time of possession	30:37	29:23

Team	Category	Player	Statistics
Boise State	Passing	Maddux Madsen	17/40, 148 yards, TD
Boise State	Rushing	Ashton Jeanty	25 carries, 192 yards, 3 TD
Boise State	Receiving	Cam Camper	4 receptions, 52 yards, TD
Oregon	Passing	Dillon Gabriel	18/21, 243 yards, 2 TD
Oregon	Rushing	Jordan James	17 carries, 102 yards
Oregon	Receiving	Evan Stewart	5 receptions, 112 yards, TD

=== vs. Portland State (FCS) ===
Game Three – Portland State Vikings (FCS) (0–2) vs Boise State Broncos (1–1) – Game summary

Quarter	1	2	3	4	Total
Vikings (FCS)	7	0	0	7	14
Broncos	7	21	14	14	56

at Albertsons Stadium • Boise, ID

- Date: Saturday September 21, 2024
- Game time: 7:45 p.m.
- Game weather: Sunny, 73 °F (23 °C)
- Game attendance: 36,972
- Referee: Kenneth Ray
- TV announcers (FS1): Eric Collins (play-by-play) and Spencer Tillman (analyst)

Game information

First quarter

- (11:23) BSU - Cameron Bates 20-yard run, Jonah Dalmas kick (Drive: 3 plays, 52 yards, 1:05; Boise State 7-0)
- (5:01) PSU - Delon Thompson 0-yard run, Mathias Uribe kick (Drive: 12 plays, 73 yards, 6:14; Tied 7-7)

Second quarter

- (14:55) BSU - Matt Lauter 4-yard pass from Maddux Madsen, Jonah Dalmas kick (Drive: 4 plays, 80 yards, 1:49; Boise State 14-7)
- (4:39) BSU - Maddux Madsen 1-yard run, Jonah Dalmas kick (Drive: 9 plays, 77 yards, 4:16; Boise State 21-7)
- (0:44) BSU - Cam Camper 18-yard pass from Maddux Madsen, Jonah Dalmas kick (Drive: 6 plays, 50 yards, 2:14; Boise State 28-7)

Third quarter

- (8:09) BSU - Cam Camper 52-yard pass from Maddux Madsen, Jonah Dalmas kick (Drive: 4 plays, 64 yards, 1:50; Boise State 35-7)
- (1:58) BSU - Dylan Riley 2-yard run, Jonah Dalmas kick (Drive: 10 plays, 64 yards, 4:49; Boise State 42-7)

Fourth quarter

- (14:28) PSU - Dante Chachere 10-yard run, Mathias Uribe kick (Drive: 6 plays, 65 yards, 2:30; Boise State 42-14)
- (9:23) BSU - Tyler Crowe 6-yard run, Jonah Dalmas kick (Drive: 12 plays, 66 yards, 4:57; Boise State 49-14)
- (7:38) BSU - Dylan Riley 64-yard run, Jonah Dalmas kick (1 play, 64 yards, 0:11; Boise State 56-14)

Statistics	PSU	BSU
First downs	12	27
Total yards	277	609
Rushing yards	147	342
Passing yards	130	267
Passing: Comp–Att–Int	13–20–0	20–28–0
Time of possession	30:46	29:14

Team	Category	Player	Statistics
Portland State	Passing	Dante Chachere	12/18, 126 yards
Portland State	Rushing	Dante Chachere	13 carries, 76 yards, TD
Portland State	Receiving	Eric Denham	2 receptions, 43 yards
Boise State	Passing	Maddux Madsen	13/18, 188 yards, 3 TD
Boise State	Rushing	Ashton Jeanty	11 carries, 127 yards
Boise State	Receiving	Matt Lauter	7 receptions, 91 yards, TD

=== vs Washington State ===
Washington State Cougars (4–0) vs No. 25 Boise State Broncos (2–1) – Game summary

Quarter	1	2	3	4	Total
Cougars	7	3	0	14	24
No. 25 Broncos	7	10	7	21	45

at Albertsons Stadium • Boise, ID

- Date: September 28, 2024
- Game time: 8:00 p.m.
- Game weather: Clear • Temperature: 84 °F (29 °C) • Wind: W 4 miles per hour (6.4 km/h)
- Game attendance: 37,711
- Referee: Christian Watson
- TV announcers (FS1): Dan Hellie (play-by-play) and Petros Papadakis (analyst)

Game information

First quarter

- (12:52) BSU - Ashton Jeanty 64-yard run, Jonah Dalmas kick (Drive: 5 plays, 75 yards, 2:08; Boise State 7-0)
- (11:23) WSU - Cooper Mathers 14-yard pass from John Mateer, Dean Janikowski kick (Drive: 3 plays, 65 yards, 1:29; Tied 7-7)

Second quarter

- (14:11) BSU - Jonah Dalmas 29-yard field goal (Drive: 10 plays, 60 yards, 4:55; Boise State 10-7)
- (8:27) WSU - Dean Janikowski 35-yard field goal (Drive: 6 plays, 46 yards, 2:37; Tied 10-10)
- (3:19) BSU - Ashton Jeanty 14-yard run, Jonah Dalmas kick (Drive: 9 plays, 82 yards, 5:01; Boise State 17-10)

Third quarter

- (1:22) BSU - Matt Lauter 22-yard pass from Maddux Madsen, Jonah Dalmas kick (Drive: 3 plays, 27 yards, 0:58; Boise State 24-10)

Fourth quarter

- (14:52) WSU - Kyle Williams 33-yard pass from John Mateer, Dean Janikowski kick (Drive: 6 plays, 75 yards, 1:30; Boise State 24-17)
- (13:17) BSU - Ashton Jeanty 59-yard run, Jonah Dalmas kick (Drive: 4 plays, 75 yards, 1:35; Boise State 31-17)
- (9:38) BSU - Ashton Jeanty 2-yard run, Jonah Dalmas kick (Drive: 5 plays, 44 yards, 2:10; Boise State 38-17)
- (4:16) BSU - Matt Lauter 34-yard pass from Maddux Madsen, Jonah Dalmas kick (Drive: 6 plays, 56 yards, 3:49; Boise State 45-17)
- (0:19) WSU - Leo Pulalasi 1-yard run, Dean Janikowski (Drive: 11 plays, 75 yards, 3:57; Boise State 45-24)

Statistics	WSU	BSU
First downs	21	21
Total yards	416	460
Rushing yards	89	276
Passing yards	327	184
Passing: Comp–Att–Int	26–37–1	12–21–1
Time of possession	33:28	26:32

Team	Category	Player	Statistics
Washington State	Passing	John Mateer	26/37, 327 yards, 2 TD, INT
Washington State	Rushing	Wayshawn Parker	11 carries, 35 yards
Washington State	Receiving	Kyle Williams	9 receptions, 142 yards, TD
Boise State	Passing	Maddux Madsen	12/21, 184 yards, 2 TD, INT
Boise State	Rushing	Ashton Jeanty	26 carries, 259 yards, 4 TD
Boise State	Receiving	Matt Lauter	4 receptions, 96 yards, 2 TD

=== vs Utah State ===
Utah State Aggies (1–3) vs No. 21 Boise State Broncos (3–1) – Game summary

Quarter	1	2	3	4	Total
Aggies	3	14	7	6	30
No. 21 Broncos	14	35	6	7	62

at Albertsons Stadium • Boise, ID

- Date: October 5, 2024
- Game time: 5:00 p.m.
- Game weather: Sunny, 70 °F (21 °C)
- Game attendance: 37,210
- Referee: Michael Cuttone
- TV announcers (FS2): Eric Collins (play-by-play) and Spencer Tillman (analyst)

Game information

First quarter

- (13:01) BSU - Ashton Jeanty 63-yard run, Jonah Dalmas kick (Drive: 1 play, 63 yards, 0:11; Boise State 7-0)
- (7:07) USU - Tanner Cragun 36-yard field goal (Drive: 5 plays, 25 yards, 1:41; Boise State 7-3)
- (4:08) BSU - Cam Camper 6-yard pass from Maddux Madsen, Jonah Dalmas kick (Drive: 7 plays, 75 yards, 2:59; Boise State 14-3)

Second quarter

- (14:30) USU - Jalen Royals 59-yard pass from Spencer Petras, Tanner Cragun kick (Drive: 7 plays, 80 yards, 2:00; Boise State 14-10)
- (14:18) BSU - Ashton Jeanty 75-yard run, Jonah Dalmas kick (Drive: 1 play, 75 yards, 0:12; Boise State 21-10)
- (9:34) BSU - Austin Bolt 3-yard pass from Maddux Madsen, Jonah Dalmas kick (Drive: 8 plays, 85 yards, 3:27; Boise State 28-10)
- (6:04) BSU - Ashton Jeanty 6-yard run, Jonah Dalmas kick (Drive: 5 plays, 46 yards, 2:29; Boise State 35-10)
- (5:29) USU - Jalen Royals 75-yard pass from Spencer Petras, Tanner Cragun kick (Drive: 2 plays, 75 yards, 0:35; Boise State 35-17)
- (5:17) BSU - Dylan Riley 96-yard kickoff return, Jonah Dalmas kick (Boise State 42-17)
- (0:29) BSU - Austin Bolt 4-yard pass from Maddux Madsen, Jonah Dalmas kick (Drive: 9 plays, 86 yards, 1:33; Boise State 49-17)

Third quarter

- (9:58) BSU - Jonah Dalmas 48-yard field goal (Drive: 10 plays, 34 yards, 5:02; Boise State 52-17)
- (5:45) BSU - Jonah Dalmas 42-yard field goal (Drive: 7 plays, 43 yards, 3:04; Boise State 55-17)
- (2:09) USU - Otto Tia 6-yard pass from Spencer Petras, Tanner Cragun kick (Drive: 10 plays, 77 yards, 3:29; Boise State 55-24)

Fourth quarter

- (14:06) USU - Rahsul Faison 8-yard run, two-point pass failed (Drive: 6 plays, 43 yards, 1:33; Boise State 55-30)
- (11:08) BSU - Jambres Dubar 2-yard run, Jonah Dalmas kick (Drive: 6 plays, 24 yards, 2:53; Boise State 62-30)

Statistics	USU	BSU
First downs	21	27
Total yards	507	599
Rushing yards	135	296
Passing yards	372	303
Passing: Comp–Att–Int	27-41-0	26-32-1
Time of possession	25:34	34:26

Team	Category	Player	Statistics
Utah State	Passing	Spencer Petras	27/41, 372 yards, 3 TD
Utah State	Rushing	Rahsul Faison	26 carries, 109 yards, TD
Utah State	Receiving	Jalen Royals	9 receptions, 211 yards, 2 TD
Boise State	Passing	Maddux Madsen	21/25, 256 yards, 3 TD
Boise State	Rushing	Ashton Jeanty	13 carries, 186 yards, 3 TD
Boise State	Receiving	Chase Penry	4 receptions, 74 yards

=== at Hawaii ===
Game Six – No. 17 Boise State Broncos (4–1) vs Hawaii Rainbow Warriors (2–3) – Game summary

Quarter	1	2	3	4	Total
No. 17 Broncos	10	3	0	15	28
Rainbow Warriors	0	7	0	0	7

at Clarence T.C. Ching Athletics Complex • Honolulu, HI

- Date: Saturday October 12, 2024
- Game time: 9:00 p.m.
- Game weather: Sunny • Temperature: 81 °F (27 °C) • Wind: NW at 13 miles per hour (21 km/h)
- Game attendance: 15,194
- Referee: Patrick Foy
- TV announcers (CBSSN): Rich Waltz (play-by-play) and Robert Turbin (analyst)

Game information

First quarter

- BSU – Jonah Dalmas 24-yard field goal, 10:14. Broncos 3–0. Drive: 8 plays, 57 yards, 4:17.
- BSU – Ashton Jeanty 54-yard run (Jonah Dalmas kick), 5:48. Broncos 10–0. Drive: 4 plays, 81 yards, 2:26.

Second quarter

- BSU – Jonah Dalmas 23-yard field goal, 7:06. Broncos 13–0. Drive: 17 plays, 73 yards, 7:49.
- HAW – Tylan Hines 27-yard pass from Brayden Schager (Kansei Matsuzawa kick), 3:24. Broncos 13–7. Drive: 6 plays, 91 yards, 3:33.

Third quarter

No scoring plays

Fourth quarter

- BSU – Ashton Jeanty 5-yard pass from Maddux Madsen (Maddux Madsen pass to Austin Bolt), 12:00. Broncos 21–7. Drive: 11 plays, 91 yards, 5:03.
- BSU – Austin Bolt 44-yard pass from Maddux Madsen (Jonah Dalmas kick), 3:39. Broncos 28–7. Drive: 5 plays, 81 yards, 1:41.

Statistics	BSU	HAW
First downs	23	17
Total yards	455	287
Rushing yards	238	23
Passing yards	217	264
Passing: Comp–Att–Int	17–25–0	21–36–0
Time of possession	32:07	27:53

Team	Category	Player	Statistics
Boise State	Passing	Maddux Madsen	17/25, 217 yards, 2 TD
Boise State	Rushing	Ashton Jeanty	31 carries, 217 yards, TD
Boise State	Receiving	Cameron Camper	7 receptions, 111 yards
Hawaii	Passing	Brayden Schager	21/37, 264 yards, TD
Hawaii	Rushing	Brayden Schager	16 carries, 13 yards
Hawaii	Receiving	Nick Cenacle	7 receptions, 59 yards

=== at UNLV ===
No. 17 Boise State Broncos (5–1) at UNLV Rebels (6–1) – Game summary

Quarter	1	2	3	4	Total
No. 17 Broncos	3	17	3	6	29
Rebels	10	0	14	0	24

at Allegiant Stadium • Paradise, NV

- Date: October 26, 2024
- Game time: 8:30 p.m.
- Game weather: None (Indoor stadium)
- Game attendance: 42,228
- Referee: Nolan Dumas
- TV announcers (CBSSN): Rich Waltz (play-by-play), Robert Turbin (analyst), and Tiffany Blackmon (sideline)

Game information

First quarter

- (11:34) BSU - Jonah Dalmas 34-yard field goal (Drive: 7 plays, 55 yards, 3:26; Boise State 3-0)
- (8:47) UNLV - Caden Chittenden 28-yard field goal (Drive: 6 plays, 64 yards, 2:41; Tied 3-3)
- (4:30) UNLV - Kaleo Ballungay 9-yard pass from Hajj-Malik Williams, Caden Chittenden kick (Drive: 6 plays, 66 yards, 2:30; UNLV 10-3)

Second quarter

- (9:22) BSU - Jonah Dalmas 44-yard field goal (Drive: 9 plays, 39 yards, 3:38; UNLV 10-6)
- (1:50) BSU - Maddux Madsen 7-yard run, Jonah Dalmas kick (Drive: 11 plays, 80 yards, 4:35; Boise State 13-10)
- (0:06) BSU - Matt Lauter 2-yard pass from Maddux Madsen, Jonah Dalmas kick (Drive: 4 plays, 7 yards, 1:28; Boise State 20-10)

Third quarter

- (11:10) UNLV - Hajj-Malik Williams 5-yard run, Caden Chittenden kick (Drive: 9 plays, 70 yards, 3:42; Boise State 20-17)
- (8:24) BSU - Jonah Dalmas 29-yard field goal (Drive: 8 plays, 64 yards, 2:46; Boise State 23-17)
- (1:03) UNLV - Jaden Bradley 34-yard pass from Hajj-Malik Williams, Caden Chittenden kick (Drive: 5 plays, 53 yards, 1:37; UNLV 24-23)

Fourth quarter

- (12:38) BSU - Ashton Jeanty 1-yard run, two-point pass failed (Drive: 8 plays, 75 yards, 3:25; Boise State 29-24)

Statistics	BSU	UNLV
First downs	21	16
Total yards	394	367
Rushing yards	185	188
Passing yards	209	179
Passing: Comp–Att–Int	18–33–0	12–22–1
Time of possession	33:58	25:54

Team	Category	Player	Statistics
Boise State	Passing	Maddux Madsen	18/33, 209 yards, TD
Boise State	Rushing	Ashton Jeanty	33 carries, 128 yards, TD
Boise State	Receiving	Austin Bolt	2 receptions, 43 yards
UNLV	Passing	Hajj-Malik Williams	12/21, 179 yards, 2 TD, INT
UNLV	Rushing	Hajj-Malik Williams	19 carries, 105 yards, TD
UNLV	Receiving	Ricky White III	5 receptions, 57 yards

=== vs San Diego State ===
San Diego State Aztecs (3–4) vs No. 15 Boise State Broncos (6–1) – Game summary

Quarter	1	2	3	4	Total
Aztecs	0	10	0	14	24
No. 15 Broncos	21	14	7	14	56

at Albertsons Stadium • Boise, ID

- Date: November 1, 2024
- Game time: 6:00 p.m.
- Game weather: Cloudy • Temperature: 55 °F (13 °C) • Wind: SE 17 miles per hour (27 km/h)
- Game attendance: 36,838
- Referee: Kenneth Ray
- TV announcers (FS1): Trent Rush (play-by-play) and Petros Papadakis (analyst)

Game information

First quarter

- (10:34) BSU - Latrell Caples 18-yard pass from Maddux Madsen, Jonah Dalmas kick (Drive: 8 plays, 66 yards, 3:35; Boise State 7-0)
- (1:39) BSU - Latrell Caples 19-yard pass from Maddux Madsen, Jonah Dalmas kick (Drive: 10 plays, 75 yards, 5:48; Boise State 14-0)
- (1:31) BSU - A'Marion McCoy 35-yard interception return, Jonah Dalmas kick (Boise State 21-0)

Second quarter

- (11:35) BSU - Prince Strachan 14-yard pass from Maddux Madsen, Jonah Dalmas kick (Drive: 9 plays, 58 yards, 3:34; Boise State 28-0)
- (9:12) SDSU - Gabriel Plascencia 27-yard field goal (Drive: 8 plays, 52 yards, 2:19; Boise State 28-3)
- (5:58) SDSU - Marquez Cooper 6-yard run, Gabriel Plascencia kick (Drive: 5 plays, 65 yards, 1:42; Boise State 28-10)
- (0:22) BSU - Latrell Caples 14-yard pass from Maddux Madsen, Jonah Dalmas kick (Drive: 13 plays, 75 yards, 5:36; Boise State 35-10)

Third quarter

- (10:13) BSU - Ashton Jeanty 4-yard run, Jonah Dalmas kick (Drive: 9 plays, 75 yards, 4:47; Boise State 42-10)

Fourth quarter

- (13:03) BSU - Ashton Jeanty 4-yard run, Jonah Dalmas kick (Drive: 13 plays, 90 yards, 6:27; Boise State 49-10)
- (7:35) SDSU - Jordan Napier 30-yard pass from Danny O'Neil, Gabriel Plascencia kick (Drive: 16 plays, 75 yards, 5:28; Boise State 49-17)
- (3:03) BSU - Tyler Crowe 2-yard run, Jonah Dalmas kick (Drive: 8 plays, 75 yards, 4:32; Boise State 56-17)
- (0:30) SDSU - Mekhi Shaw 30-yard pass from Danny O'Neil, Gabriel Plascencia kick (Drive: 7 plays, 54 yards, 2:21; Boise State 56-24)

Statistics	SDSU	BSU
First downs	12	34
Total yards	256	541
Rushing yards	101	219
Passing yards	155	322
Passing: Comp–Att–Int	14–30–2	26–34–0
Time of possession	20:28	39:32

Team	Category	Player	Statistics
San Diego State	Passing	Danny O'Neil	14/30, 155 yards, 2 TD, 2 INT
San Diego State	Rushing	Marquez Cooper	16 carries, 94 yards, TD
San Diego State	Receiving	Jordan Napier	8 receptions, 79 yards, TD
Boise State	Passing	Maddux Madsen	24/32, 307 yards, 4 TD
Boise State	Rushing	Ashton Jeanty	31 carries, 149 yards, 2 TD
Boise State	Receiving	Latrell Caples	6 receptions, 90 yards, 3 TD

=== vs. Nevada (rivalry) ===
Game Nine – Nevada Wolf Pack (3–7) at No. 12 Boise State Broncos (7–1) – Game summary

Quarter	1	2	3	4	Total
Wolf Pack	7	7	0	7	21
No. 12 Broncos	14	0	7	7	28

at Albertsons Stadium • Boise, ID

- Date: Saturday November 9, 2024
- Game time: 6:00 p.m.
- Game weather: Clear • Temperature: 50 °F (10 °C) • Wind: SW 6 miles per hour (9.7 km/h)
- Game attendance: 37,143
- Referee: Jonathan Noli
- TV announcers (FOX): Tim Brando (play-by-play), Devin Gardner (analyst), and Josh Sims (sideline)

Game information

First quarter

- (7:36) BSU - Matt Lauter 11-yard pass from Maddux Madsen, Jonah Dalmas kick (Drive: 12 plays, 68 yards, 5:56; Boise State 7-0)
- (4:12) BSU - Ashton Jeanty 4-yard run, Jonah Dalmas kick (Drive: 4 plays, 54 yards, 1:28; Boise State 14-0)
- (0:57) NEV - Brendon Lewis 17-yard run, Kian Afrookhteh kick (Drive: 6 plays, 75 yards, 3:15; Boise State 14-7)

Second quarter

- (6:14) NEV - Caleb Ramseur 44-yard pass from Marcus Bellon, Kian Afrookhteh kick (Drive: 7 plays, 66 yards, 4:05; Tied 14-14)

Third quarter

- (10:50) BSU - Ashton Jeanty 1-yard run, Jonah Dalmas kick (Drive: 8 plays, 95 yards, 4:07; Boise State 21-14)

Fourth quarter

- (10:05) BSU - Ashton Jeanty 2-yard run, Jonah Dalmas kick (Drive: 10 plays, 62 yards, 3:58; Boise State 28-14)
- (2:19) NEV - Jaden Smith 36-yard pass from Brendon Lewis, Kian Afrookhteh kick (Drive: 4 plays, 64 yards, 1:06; Boise State 28-21)

Statistics	NEV	BSU
First downs	13	21
Total yards	319	393
Rushing yards	87	274
Passing yards	232	119
Passing: Comp–Att–Int	18–27–0	9–20–1
Time of possession	28:45	31:15

Team	Category	Player	Statistics
Nevada	Passing	Brendon Lewis	17/26, 188 yards, TD
Nevada	Rushing	Sean Dollars	15 carries, 38 yards
Nevada	Receiving	Jaden Smith	4 receptions, 57 yards, TD
Boise State	Passing	Maddux Madsen	9/20, 119 yards, TD, INT
Boise State	Rushing	Ashton Jeanty	34 carries, 209 yards, 3 TD
Boise State	Receiving	Matt Lauter	5 receptions, 61 yards, TD

=== at San Jose State ===
No. 13 Boise State Broncos (8–1) at San Jose State Spartans (6–3) – Game summary

Quarter	1	2	3	4	Total
No. 13 Broncos	0	14	14	14	42
Spartans	7	7	7	0	21

at CEFCU Stadium • San Jose, CA

- Date: November 16, 2024
- Game time: 5:00 p.m.
- Game attendance: 20,517
- TV announcers (CBSSN): Rich Waltz (play-by-play), Robert Turbin (analyst), and Amanda Guerra (sideline)

Game information

First quarter

- (10:14) SJSU - Justin Lockhart 6-yard pass from Walker Eget, Kyler Halvorsen kick (Drive: 8 plays, 68 yards, 3:17; San Jose State 7-0)

Second quarter

- (14:23) SJSU - Jacob Stewart 7-yard pass from Walker Eget, Kyler Halvorsen kick (Drive: 11 plays, 77 yards, 4:16; San Jose State 14-0)
- (5:36) BSU - Maddux Madsen 4-yard run, Jonah Dalmas kick (Drive: 11 plays, 92 yards, 5:50; San Jose State 14-7)
- (0:36) BSU - Ashton Jeanty 2-yard run, Jonah Dalmas kick (Drive: 10 plays, 75 yards, 3:27; Tied 14-14)

Third quarter

- (11:03) SJSU - Nick Nash 6-yard pass from Walker Eget, Kyler Halvorsen kick (Drive: 9 plays, 98 yards, 3:57; San Jose State 21-14)
- (6:43) BSU - Matt Lauter 17-yard pass from Maddux Madsen, Jonah Dalmas kick (Drive: 8 plays, 63 yards, 4:12; Tied 21-21)
- (1:42) BSU - Ashton Jeanty 36-yard run, Jonah Dalmas kick (Drive: 7 plays, 66 yards, 2:38; Boise State 28-21)

Fourth quarter

- (2:23) BSU - Ashton Jeanty 5-yard run, Jonah Dalmas kick (Drive: 12 plays, 89 yards, 6:18; Boise State 35-21)
- (1:42) BSU - Davon Banks 70-yard interception return, Jonah Dalmas kick (Boise State 42-21)

Statistics	BSU	SJSU
First downs	27	25
Total yards	456	484
Rushing yards	170	38
Passing yards	286	446
Passing: Comp–Att–Int	22-30-0	34-50-2
Time of possession	33:11	26:49

Team	Category	Player	Statistics
Boise State	Passing	Maddux Madsen	22/30, 286 yards, TD
Boise State	Rushing	Ashton Jeanty	32 carries, 159 yards, 3 TD
Boise State	Receiving	Cam Camper	6 receptions, 92 yards
San Jose State	Passing	Walker Eget	34/50, 446 yards, 3 TD, 2 INT
San Jose State	Rushing	Floyd Chalk IV	13 carries, 37 yards
San Jose State	Receiving	Justin Lockhart	10 receptions, 172 yards, TD

=== at Wyoming ===
No. 12 Boise State Broncos (9–1) at Wyoming Cowboys (2–8) – Game summary

Quarter	1	2	3	4	Total
No. 12 Broncos	7	3	0	7	17
Cowboys	3	7	0	3	13

at War Memorial Stadium • Laramie, WY

- Date: November 23, 2024
- Game time: 5:00 p.m.
- Game weather: Clear, 49 °F (9 °C)
- Game attendance: 18,094
- Referee: Christian Watson
- TV announcers (CBSSN): Rich Waltz (play-by-play) and Robert Turbin (analyst)

Game information

First quarter

- (11:43) WYO - John Hoyland 54-yard field goal (Drive: 7 plays, 38 yards, 3:17; Wyoming 3-0)
- (3:40) BSU - Ashton Jeanty 61-yard run, Jonah Dalmas kick (Drive: 2 plays, 64 yards, 0:46; Boise State 7-3)

Second quarter

- (9:36) WYO - Justin Stevenson 5-yard pass from Kaden Anderson, John Hoyland kick (Drive: 4 plays, 67 yards, 2:18; Wyoming 10-7)
- (0:00) BSU - Jonah Dalmas 24-yard field goal (Drive: 8 plays, 50 yards, 1:43; Tied 10-10)

Third quarter

No scoring plays

Fourth quarter

- (9:03) WYO - John Hoyland 35-yard field goal (Drive: 7 plays, 70 yards, 4:25; Wyoming 13-10)
- (5:02) BSU - Jambres Dubar 2-yard run, Jonah Dalmas kick (Drive: 8 plays, 75 yards, 4:01; Boise State 17-13)

Statistics	BSU	WYO
First downs	15	14
Total yards	352	319
Rushing yards	185	116
Passing yards	167	203
Passing: Comp–Att–Int	14-26-0	15-27-0
Time of possession	25:56	34:04

Team	Category	Player	Statistics
Boise State	Passing	Maddux Madsen	14/26, 167 yards
Boise State	Rushing	Ashton Jeanty	19 carries, 169 yards, TD
Boise State	Receiving	Cam Camper	5 receptions, 73 yards
Wyoming	Passing	Kaden Anderson	9/14, 116 yards, TD
Wyoming	Rushing	Harrison Waylee	16 carries, 69 yards
Wyoming	Receiving	Jaylen Sargent	4 receptions, 86 yards

=== vs Oregon State ===
Oregon State Beavers (5–6) vs No. 11 Boise State Broncos (10–1) – Game summary

Quarter	1	2	3	4	Total
Beavers	0	7	3	8	18
No. 11 Broncos	14	7	6	7	34

at Albertsons Stadium • Boise, ID

- Date: November 29, 2024
- Game time: 10:00 a.m.
- Game attendance: 37,264
- TV announcers (FOX): Tim Brando (play-by-play), Devin Gardner (analyst), and Josh Sims (sideline)

Game information

First quarter

- (7:49) BSU - Austin Bolt 11-yard pass from Maddux Madsen, Jonah Dalmas kick (Drive: 14 plays, 81 yards, 7:04; Boise State 7-0)
- (1:11) BSU - Ashton Jeanty 7-yard run, Jonah Dalmas kick (Drive: 11 plays, 53 yards, 4:36; Boise State 14-0)

Second quarter

- (1:48) ORST - Anthony Hankerson 83-yard run, Everett Hayes kick (Drive: 2 plays, 92 yards, 0:27; Boise State 14-7)
- (0:20) BSU - Latrell Caples 6-yard pass from Maddux Madsen, Jonah Dalmas kick (Drive: 8 plays, 75 yards, 1:28; Boise State 21-7)

Third quarter

- (7:34) BSU - Jonah Dalmas 43-yard field goal (Drive: 15 plays, 50 yards, 5:52; Boise State 24-7)
- (2:50) ORST - Everett Hayes 37-yard field goal (Drive: 10 plays, 55 yards, 4:44; Boise State 24-10)
- (1:28) BSU - Jonah Dalmas 29-yard field goal (Drive: 5 plays, 63 yards, 1:22; Boise State 27-10)

Fourth quarter

- (11:51) ORST - Darrius Clemons 12-yard pass from Ben Gulbranson, Gulbranson to Clemons pass (Drive: 10 plays, 75 yards, 4:37; Boise State 27-18)
- (0:58) BSU - Maddux Madsen 3-yard run, Jonah Dalmas kick (Drive: 6 plays, 32 yards, 1:52; Boise State 34-18)

Statistics	ORST	BSU
First downs	13	27
Total yards	342	465
Rushing yards	116	270
Passing yards	226	195
Passing: Comp–Att–Int	27–37–0	17–33–0
Time of possession	25:55	36:42

Team	Category	Player	Statistics
Oregon State	Passing	Ben Gulbranson	21/37, 226 yards, TD
Oregon State	Rushing	Anthony Hankerson	11 carries, 110 yards, TD
Oregon State	Receiving	Darrius Clemons	8 receptions, 123 yards, TD
Boise State	Passing	Maddux Madsen	17/33, 195 yards, 2 TD
Boise State	Rushing	Ashton Jeanty	37 carries, 226 yards, TD
Boise State	Receiving	Cam Camper	6 receptions, 73 yards

=== vs No. 20 UNLV (Mountain West Championship Game) ===
2024 Mountain West Championship Game
No. 20 UNLV Rebels (10-2, 6-1) at No. 10 Boise State (11-1, 7-0)

Quarter	1	2	3	4	Total
No. 20 Rebels	0	0	0	7	7
No. 10 Broncos	7	14	0	0	21

at Albertson Stadium • Boise, Idaho

- Date: December 6th, 2024
- Game time: 6:00 p.m. MST
- Game weather: Temperature: 27 °F (−3 °C) • Wind: WNW at 6 miles per hour (9.7 km/h) • Weather: Foggy
- Game attendance: 36,663
- Referee: Christian Watson
- TV announcers (FOX/Gridiron Radio): Jason Benetti (play-by-play), Brock Huard (analyst), and Allison Williams (sidelines)/Chris Sylvester (play-by-play) and Jared Petrino (analyst)

Game information

First Quarter

- (3:51) BSU – Latrell Caples 22 yard pass from Maddux Madsen, Jonah Dalmas kick (Drive: 4 plays, 55 yards, 2:33; Boise State 7–0)

Second Quarter

- (2:40) BSU – Maddux Madsen 14 yard run, Jonah Dalmas kick (Drive: 12 plays, 69 yards, 6:33; Boise State 14–0)
- (0:29) BSU – Ashton Jeanty 75 yard run, Jonah Dalmas kick (Drive: 2 plays, 80 yards, 0:47; Boise State 21–0)

Third Quarter

No scoring plays

Fourth Quarter

- (9:06) UNLV – Greg Burrell 31 yard run, Caden Chittenden kick (Drive: 9 plays, 81 yards, 3:30; Boise State 21–7)

Statistics	UNLV	BSU
First downs	13	19
Total yards	327	373
Rushing yards	217	215
Passing yards	110	158
Passing: Comp–Att–Int	13–28–1	18–27–0
Time of possession	27:46	32:14

Team	Category	Player	Statistics
UNLV	Passing	Hajj-Malik Williams	13/28, 110 yards, INT
UNLV	Rushing	Kylin James	2 carries, 95 yards
UNLV	Receiving	Corey Thompson Jr.	2 receptions, 32 yards
Boise State	Passing	Maddux Madsen	18/27, 158 yards, TD
Boise State	Rushing	Ashton Jeanty	32 carries, 209 yards, TD
Boise State	Receiving	Matt Lauter	5 receptions, 62 yards

=== vs No. 4 Penn State (Fiesta Bowl / CFP Quarterfinal) ===
College Football Playoff Quarterfinal at the 2024 Vrbo Fiesta Bowl
No. 4 Penn State Nittany Lions (12-2) vs No. 9 Boise State Broncos (12-1)

Quarter	1	2	3	4	Total
No. 4 Nittany Lions	14	3	7	7	31
No. 9 Broncos	0	7	7	0	14

at State Farm Stadium • Glendale, Arizona

- Date: Tuesday, December 31, 2024
- Game time: 5:30 p.m. MST
- Game weather: Indoors, roof closed
- Game attendance: 63,854
- Referee: Steve Marlowe
- TV announcers (ESPN/ESPN Radio): Bob Wischusen (play-by-play), Louis Riddick (analyst), Kris Budden, and Tom Luginbill (sidelines)/Mike Couzens (play-by-play), Max Starks (analyst), and Lauren Sisler (sideline)

Game information

First quarter

- PSU – Tyler Warren, 11-yard TD pass from Drew Allar, Ryan Barker kick, 6:40 (PSU 7–0)
- PSU – Omari Evans, 38-yard TD pass from Allar, Barker kick, 3:35 (PSU 14–0)

Second quarter

- BSU – Tyler Crowe, 8-yard TD run, Jonah Dalmas kick, 8:41 (PSU 14–7)
- PSU – Barker, 40-yard field goal, 0:00 (PSU 17–7)

Third quarter

- BSU – Matt Lauter, 53-yard TD pass from Maddux Madsen, Dalmas kick, 11:38 (PSU 17–14)
- PSU – Warren, 13-yard TD pass from Allar, Barker kick, 7:22 (PSU 24–14)

Fourth quarter

- PSU – Nicholas Singleton, 58-yard TD run, Barker kick, 4:54 (PSU 31–14)

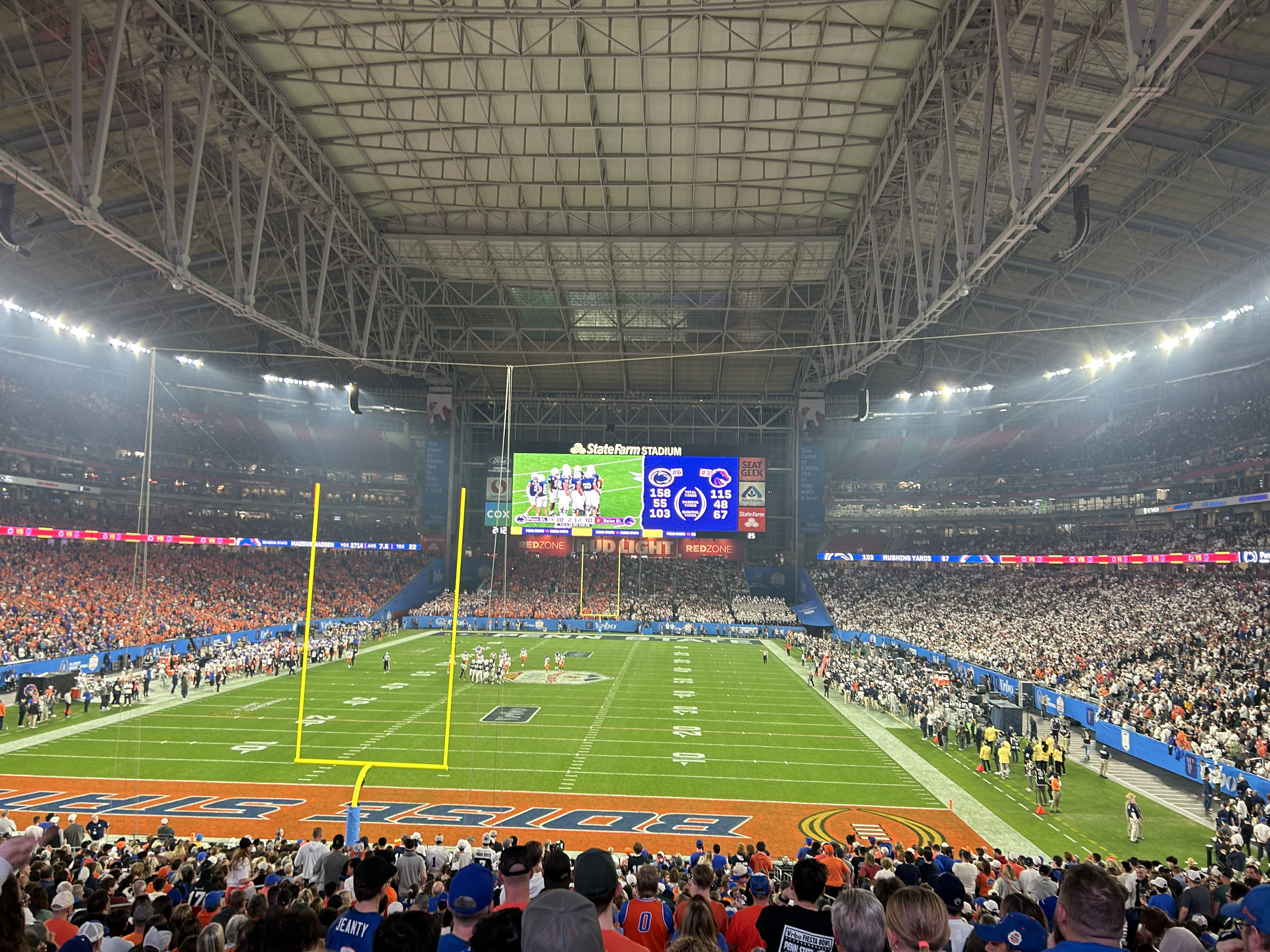
Fiesta Bowl against Penn State

Statistics	PSU	BSU
First downs	21	24
Total yards	387	412
Rushing yards	216	108
Passing yards	171	304
Turnovers	1	4
Time of possession	25:56	34:04

Team	Category	Player	Statistics
Penn State	Passing	Drew Allar	13/25, 171 yards, 3 TD
Penn State	Rushing	Kaytron Allen	17 carries, 134 yards
Penn State	Receiving	Tyler Warren	6 receptions, 63 yards, 2 TD
Boise State	Passing	Maddux Madsen	23/35, 304 yards, TD, 3 INT
Boise State	Rushing	Ashton Jeanty	30 carries, 104 yards
Boise State	Receiving	Matt Lauter	4 receptions, 96 yards, TD
