= 2024 Fiesta Bowl (December) =

American college football game

2024 Vrbo Fiesta Bowl
- College Football Playoff Quarterfinal; 54th Fiesta Bowl
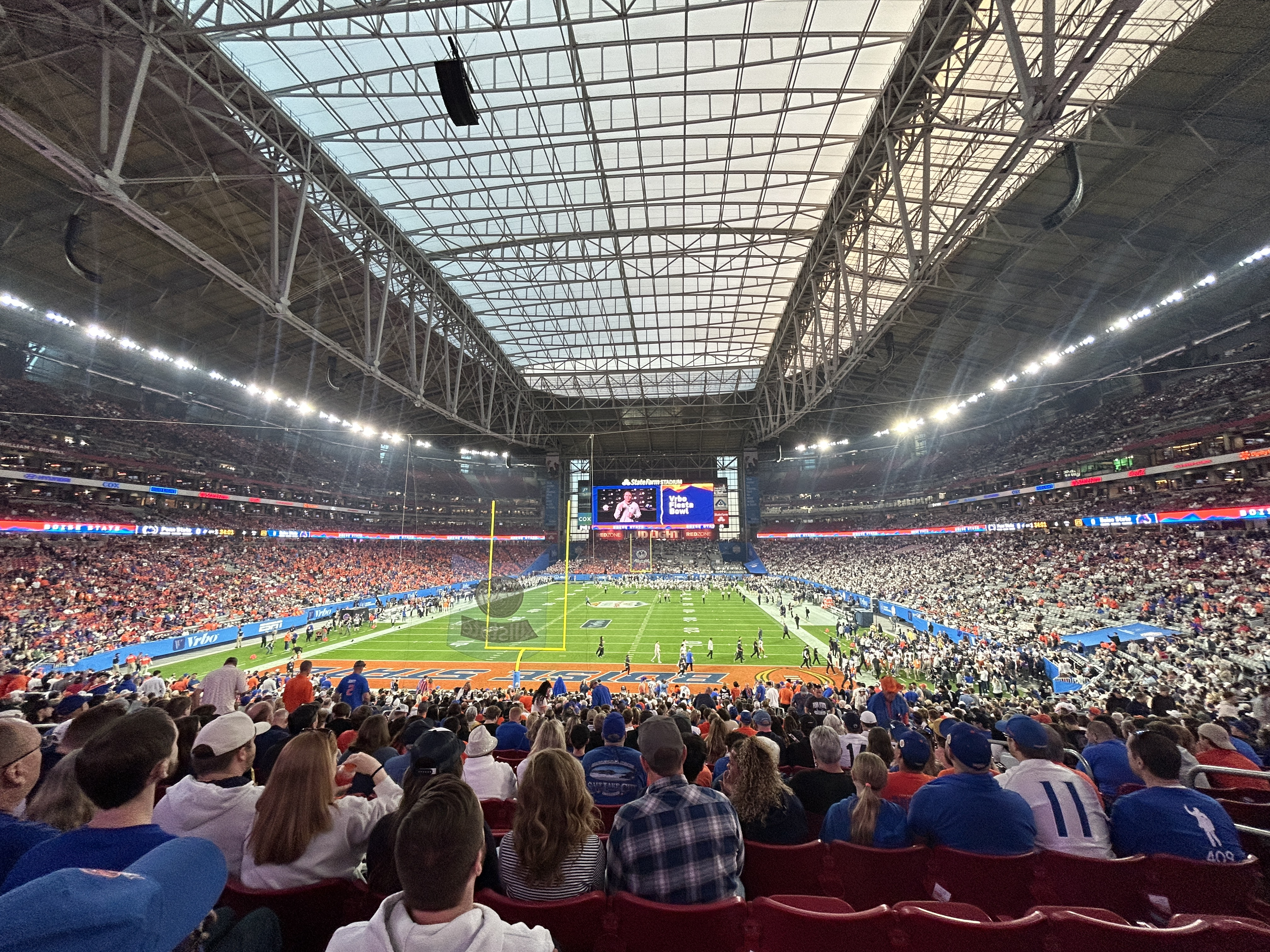
- State Farm Stadium during the Fiesta Bowl between the Boise State Broncos and Penn State Nittany Lions.
Penn State Nittany Lions	Boise State Broncos
(12–2)	(12–1)
Big Ten	Mountain West
31	14
Head coach: James Franklin	Head coach: Spencer Danielson
AP / Coaches / CFP; 5 / 5 / 4	AP / Coaches / CFP; 8 / 8 / 9
	1	2	3	4	Total
Penn State	14	3	7	7	31
Boise State	0	7	7	0	14
- Date: December 31, 2024
- Season: 2024
- Stadium: State Farm Stadium
- Location: Glendale, Arizona
- MVP: Offensive: Tyler Warren (TE, Penn State); Defensive: Zakee Wheatley (S, Penn State)
- Favorite: Penn State by 11.5
- National anthem: Valley Youth Theatre Choir
- Referee: Steve Marlowe (SEC)
- Halftime show: Penn State Blue Band; Blue Thunder Marching Band
- Attendance: 63,854

United States TV coverage
- Network: ESPN
- Announcers: Bob Wischusen (play-by-play); Louis Riddick (analyst); Kris Budden (sideline); Tom Luginbill (sideline)

The 2024 Fiesta Bowl was a college football bowl game that was played on December 31, 2024, at State Farm Stadium in Glendale, Arizona. The 54th annual Fiesta Bowl featured Boise State and Penn State, and was one of the 2024–25 bowl games concluding the 2024 FBS football season. It was also one of the College Football Playoff (CFP) quarterfinal games, beginning at approximately 5:30 p.m. MST and airing on ESPN. Sponsored by online vacation rental marketplace Vrbo, the game was officially known as the Vrbo Fiesta Bowl.

== Background ==
The 2024 Fiesta Bowl was the first-ever quarterfinal game for the College Football Playoff (CFP). Boise State, being the ninth-ranked team in the final CFP rankings and winning their conference championship game, received a bye in the CFP's new 12-team format and was selected to play in the bowl game as the third seed in the CFP playoff. The playoff's 11th seed, SMU (ranked 10th in the final CFP poll), and sixth seed, Penn State (ranked fourth in the final CFP poll), met on December 21 for the other spot in the Fiesta Bowl, with Penn State winning by a score of 38–10.

This was the first-ever meeting between the Nittany Lions and the Broncos. Penn State defeated Boise State and advanced to the semifinal round at the Orange Bowl, to face the winner of the Sugar Bowl.

First round			Fiesta Bowl
			3	Boise State	14
11	SMU	10	6	Penn State	31
6	Penn State	38

== Teams ==
This was the first meeting between Penn State and Boise State. Both teams had previously appeared in multiple Fiesta Bowls, with undefeated records: Boise State was 3–0 in prior appearances, most recently the December 2014 edition, while Penn State was 7–0 in prior appearances, most recently the December 2017 edition.

=== Boise State Broncos ===
Boise State earned a first-round bye in the playoff as the Mountain West Conference champions. The Broncos entered with a 12–1 record (7–0 in conference); their only loss was to Oregon on September 7.

=== Penn State Nittany Lions ===
Penn State compiled an 11–1 record (8–1 in conference) during the regular season, losing only to Ohio State. The Nittany Lions qualified for the Big Ten Championship Game, which they fell to top-ranked Oregon 45–37. Penn State was then selected to compete in the CFP playoff; ranked fourth in the final CFP rankings, they received the sixth seed in the playoff bracket. Facing SMU in a first-round game, Penn State took a 28–0 lead into halftime en route to a 38–10 victory. The Nittany Lions entered the Fiesta Bowl with a 12–2 record.

== Game summary ==
College Football Playoff Quarterfinal at the 2024 Vrbo Fiesta Bowl

Quarter	1	2	3	4	Total
(6) No. 4 Penn State	14	3	7	7	31
(3) No. 9 Boise State	0	7	7	0	14

at State Farm Stadium • Glendale, Arizona

- Date: Tuesday, December 31, 2024
- Game time: 5:40 p.m. MST
- Game weather: n/a (retractable roof closed)
- Game attendance: 63,854
- Referee: Steve Marlowe
- TV announcers (ESPN): Bob Wischusen (play-by-play), Louis Riddick (analyst), Kris Budden and Tom Luginbill (sideline reporters)
- ESPN Box score

Both teams began the game with scoring chances; Boise State's first possession ended with an unsuccessful field goal attempt, and Penn State scored on a pass from Drew Allar to Tyler Warren to complete their first drive. Penn State pushed their lead to 14 points on their second drive with a 38-yard pass from Allar to Omari Evans. Both teams fumbled early into their next possessions and then traded punts early in the second quarter. Boise State scored for the first time on an 8-yard rush by Tyler Crowe, capping an eight-play drive with 8:41 remaining until halftime. After each team punted twice, Penn State's Ryan Barker made a 40-yard field goal as the quarter ended and Penn State entered halftime with a 17–7 lead.

After a three-and-out by Penn State to begin the third quarter, Boise State drew their deficit down to three points with a 53-yard touchdown pass from Maddux Madsen to Matt Lauter. The Nittany Lions reestablished a ten-point lead on their ensuing drive, though, on an Allar-to-Warren touchdown pass. Boise State's next drive concluded with the game's first interception on the first play of the fourth quarter; Madsen's pass was picked off by Zakee Wheatley at the Penn State 41-yard line. After a Penn State punt, Boise State drove to the Penn State 21-yard line but missed a 38-yard field goal. The game's final scoring play came with just under five minutes remaining on a 58-yard Nicholas Singleton rush; both of Boise State's final two drives ended with interceptions and Penn State won 31–14 to advance to the semifinals.

Scoring summary

Quarter	Time	Drive			Team	Scoring information	Score	
Quarter	Time	Plays	Yards	TOP	Team	Scoring information	Penn State	Boise State
1	6:40	9	72	4:01	Penn State	Tyler Warren 11-yard touchdown reception from Drew Allar, Ryan Barker kick good	7	0
1	3:35	4	56	1:21	Penn State	Omari Evans 38-yard touchdown reception from Drew Allar, Ryan Barker kick good	14	0
2	8:41	8	52	4:21	Boise State	Tyler Crowe 8-yard touchdown run, Jonah Dalmas kick good	14	7
2	0:00	9	41	1:01	Penn State	40-yard field goal by Ryan Barker	17	7
3	11:38	5	83	2:28	Boise State	Matt Lauter 53-yard touchdown reception from Maddux Madsen, Jonah Dalmas kick good	17	14
3	7:22	11	75	4:16	Penn State	Tyler Warren 13-yard touchdown reception from Drew Allar, Ryan Barker kick good	24	14
4	4:54	7	79	4:26	Penn State	Nicholas Singleton 58-yard touchdown run, Ryan Barker kick good	31	14
"TOP" = time of possession. For other American football terms, see Glossary of American football.							31	14

=== Statistics ===
Team statistical comparison
Statistic	Penn State	Boise State
First downs	21	25
First downs rushing	10	7
First downs passing	8	14
First downs penalty	3	4
Third down efficiency	5–13	8–15
Fourth down efficiency	0–0	0–1
Total plays–net yards	66–387	75–412
Rushing attempts–net yards	41–216	40–108
Yards per rush	5.3	2.7
Yards passing	171	304
Pass completions–attempts	13–25	23–35
Interceptions thrown	0	3
Punt returns–total yards	0–0	1–19
Kickoff returns–total yards	0–0	2–30
Punts–average yardage	6–47.2	4–40.8
Fumbles–lost	1–1	2–1
Penalties–yards	10–98	13–90
Time of possession	25:56	34:04

Penn State statistics
Nittany Lions passing
	C–A	Yds	TD–INT
Drew Allar	13–25	171	3–0
Nittany Lions rushing
	Car	Yds	TD
Kaytron Allen	17	134	0
Nicholas Singleton	12	87	1
TEAM	1	−1	0
Drew Allar	11	−4	0
Nittany Lions receiving
	Rec	Yds	TD
Tyler Warren	6	63	2
Omari Evans	2	55	1
Harrison Wallace III	3	37	0
Luke Reynolds	2	16	0

Boise State statistics
Broncos passing
	C–A	Yds	TD–INT
Maddux Madsen	23–35	304	1–3
Broncos rushing
	Car	Yds	TD
Ashton Jeanty	30	104	0
Tyler Crowe	1	8	1
Jambres Dubar	2	−1	0
Maddux Madsen	7	−3	0
Broncos receiving
	Rec	Yds	TD
Matt Lauter	4	96	1
Cameron Camper	3	66	0
Prince Strachan	4	40	0
Latrell Caples	4	30	0
Matt Wagner	2	24	0
Ashton Jeanty	3	22	0
Austin Bolt	2	14	0
Ben Ford	1	12	0
