= 2024 San Diego State Aztecs football team =

American college football season

2024 San Diego State Aztecs football
- Conference: Mountain West Conference
- Record: 3–9 (2–5 MW)
- Head coach: Sean Lewis (1st season)
- Associate head coach: Zac Barton (1st season)
- Offensive scheme: Veer and shoot
- Defensive coordinator: Eric Schmidt (1st season)
- Base defense: 4–2–5
- Captains: Marquez Cooper; Tano Letuli; Trey White
- Home stadium: Snapdragon Stadium

2024 Mountain West Conference football standings
	Conf.			Overall
Team	W		L	W		L
No. 8 Boise State y$^	7	–	0	12	–	2
No. 23 UNLV y	6	–	1	11	–	3
Colorado State	6	–	1	8	–	5
Fresno State	4	–	3	6	–	7
San Jose State	3	–	4	7	–	6
Air Force	3	–	4	5	–	7
Hawaii	3	–	4	5	–	7
New Mexico	3	–	4	5	–	7
Utah State	3	–	4	4	–	8
San Diego State	2	–	5	3	–	9
Wyoming	2	–	5	3	–	9
Nevada	0	–	7	3	–	10
Championship: Boise State 21, UNLV 7
^ – College Football Playoff participant; $ – Conference champion; y – Championship game participant; Rankings from AP Poll

The 2024 San Diego State Aztecs football team represented San Diego State University in the Mountain West Conference during the 2024 NCAA Division I FBS football season. The Aztecs were led by Sean Lewis in his first year as the head coach. The Aztecs played their home games at Snapdragon Stadium in San Diego, California.

== Schedule ==
Date	Time	Opponent	Site	TV	Result	Attendance
August 31	5:00 p.m.	Texas A&M–Commerce (Note: During the season (specifically November 7, 2024), SDSU's opponent changed its name from Texas A&M University–Commerce to East Texas A&M University.)*	Snapdragon Stadium; San Diego, CA	TruTV/Max	W 45–14	25,180
September 7	7:30 p.m.	Oregon State*	Snapdragon Stadium; San Diego, CA	CBSSN	L 0–21	25,318
September 14	7:30 p.m.	at California*	California Memorial Stadium; Berkeley, CA	ESPN	L 10–31	35,197
September 28	12:30 p.m.	at Central Michigan*	Kelly/Shorts Stadium; Mount Pleasant, MI	CBSSN	L 21–22	27,072
October 5	5:00 p.m.	Hawaii	Snapdragon Stadium; San Diego, CA	CBSSN	W 27–24	31,307
October 12	12:30 p.m.	at Wyoming	War Memorial Stadium; Laramie, WY	CBSSN	W 27–24	23,155
October 26	7:30 p.m.	Washington State*^{†}	Snapdragon Stadium; San Diego, CA	CBSSN	L 26–29	26,937
November 1	5:00 p.m.	at No. 15 Boise State	Albertsons Stadium; Boise, ID	FS1	L 24–56	36,838
November 8	7:30 p.m.	New Mexico	Snapdragon Stadium; San Diego, CA	FS1	L 16–21	21,832
November 16	7:30 p.m.	at UNLV	Allegiant Stadium; Paradise, NV	CBSSN	L 20–41	30,386
November 23	12:30 p.m.	at Utah State	Maverik Stadium; Logan, UT	CBSSN	L 20–41	12,583
November 30	7:30 p.m.	Air Force	Snapdragon Stadium; San Diego, CA	FS1	L 20–31	18,045
*Non-conference game; ^{†}Homecoming; Rankings from AP Poll and CFP Rankings released prior to game; All times are in Pacific time

== Personnel ==
=== Roster ===
2024 San Diego State Aztecs football team roster
Players
Coaches
Offense

Pos.	#	Name	Class
RB	2	Jaylon Armstead	Sr
WR	3	Ja'Shaun Poke	Sr
WR	4	Louis Brown IV	Jr
QB	5	Danny O'Neil	Fr
QB	6	Javance Tupou'ata-Johnson	Fr
RB	7	Lucky Sutton	So
QB	9	Kyle Crum	So
QB	10	AJ Duffy	So
WR	11	Nate Bennett	Sr
WR	14	Phillippe Wesley	Jr
RB	15	Marquez Cooper	Sr
QB	16	Parker Threatt	Fr
TE	18	Jude Wolfe	Sr
WR	19	Jordan Napier	Fr
RB	20	Cincere Rhaney	Fr
WR	21	Heath McRee	Fr
RB	23	Kenan Christon	Sr
RB	26	Nick Gardinera	So
RB	29	Cam Davis	Jr
WR	38	Kurt Rossner	Fr
WR	43	Derek Smith	Fr
OL	53	Myles Murao	Sr
OL	55	Brayden Bryant	Sr
OL	57	Saipale Fuimaono	Jr
OL	61	Emanuel Chow	Fr
OL	62	Kai Holec	Fr
OL	63	Ross Ulugalu-Maseuli	Jr
OL	65	Tyler McMahan	Jr
OL	68	Ryan Silver	Fr
OL	69	Gage Dutcher	Fr
OL	70	Christian Jones	Jr
OL	71	Nikolas Kattoula	Fr
OL	74	Nate Williams	Sr
OL	75	Ryan Dirksen	Jr
OL	76	Dean Abdullah	Sr
OL	77	Briley Barron	Fr
OL	78	Joseph Borjon	Jr
WR	80	Baylin Brooks	So
WR	81	Will Cianfrini	Fr
WR	82	Bobby Shaw	Fr
WR	83	Mekhi Shaw	Sr
WR	84	Ben Scolari	Fr
WR	85	Jerry McClure	Fr
TE	87	Michael Harrison	Sr
TE	88	Gabe Garretson	So
TE	89	Logan Tanner	So
TE	90	Arthur Ban	Fr
TE	95	Ryan Wolfer	Fr

Defense

Pos.	#	Name	Class
CB	0	Bryce Phillips	Sr
CB	1	Chris Johnson	Jr
LB	5	Owen Chambliss	Fr
S	6	Eric Butler	Jr
S	7	William Nimmo Jr.	Sr
S	9	Dalesean Staley	Jr
CB	10	Bennett Walker	Sr
S	11	JD Coffey III	Sr
S	12	Jatavious Magee	Jr
CB	13	Tayten Beyer	Fr
CB	15	Tayvion Beasley	So
CB	16	Jelani Whitmore	Sr
S	17	Deshawn McCuin	Sr
LB	21	Tano Letuli	Jr
S	22	Max Garrison	So
CB	23	Isaiah Buxton	Fr
S	24	Josh Hunter	So
CB	26	Joshua Goynes	Jr
S	27	Jelani McLaughlin	Fr
DL	30	Dominic Oliver	Jr
EDGE	31	Jared Badie	So
EDGE	32	Marlem Louis	Sr
EDGE	33	Ezekiel Larry	So
LB	34	Dean Harrington	Fr
CB	35	Xavier Hamlett	Sr
S	36	Prince Williams	Fr
S	37	Jason Mitchell	Fr
DL	40	Krishna Clay	So
CB	41	Jakson Berman	So
LB	42	Brady Anderson	Jr
LB	44	Kyle Moretti	Sr
DL	45	Wyatt Draeger	Sr
EDGE	47	Trey White	So
DL	48	Hudson Mitchell	Fr
DL	51	Kodi Cornelius	Fr
LB	52	Jayden Kendricks	So
LB	54	Jake Sinz	Fr
LB	56	DJ Herman	Jr
LB	58	Cody Moon	Sr
LB	59	Danny Niu	Fr
EDGE	66	Charlie Stewart	Jr
DL	67	Tiumalu Afalava	Fr
DL	86	Ryan Gaea	Fr
DL	90	Sam Benjamin	So
DL	91	Keion Mitchell	Jr
EDGE	92	Malik Gucake	Jr
DL	93	Brady Nassar	So
DL	94	Tevis Tuioti	Jr
DL	96	Ryan Henderson	So
DL	97	Darrion Dalton	Jr
EDGE	98	Zone Wierenga	Jr
DL	99	Tupu Alualu	Sr

Special teams

Pos.	#	Name	Class
P	13	Tyler Pastula	Sr
K	14	Nick Clegg	Fr
K	20	Nick Lopez	Sr
K	39	Eemil Herranen	Jr
K	46	Gabriel Plascencia	Jr
P	49	Zechariah Ramirez	So
LS	50	Ryan Wintermeyer	Sr
LS	60	Connor Poulson	Fr
LS	64	Tyson Chavez	Jr

Head coach

- Sean Lewis

Coordinators/assistant coaches

- Zac Barton (associate HC / special teams coordinator / tight ends)
- Eric Schmidt (defensive coordinator / linebackers)
- Lanear Sampson (pass game coordinator / wide receivers)
- Mike Schmidt (run game coordinator / offensive line)
- Rob Aurich (defensive edges)
- Darian Hagan (running backs)
- Matt Johnson (quarterbacks)
- David Lose (defensive line)
- C.J. McGorisk (safeties)
- Demetrius Sumler (cornerbacks)
- Ryan Lindley (senior offensive analyst)
- Steve Huber (defensive analyst)
- Jeff Sobol (head of football performance)
- Tahj Capehart (graduate assistant)
- Jayden Dawson (graduate assistant)
- Parker Houston (graduate assistant)
- Tyson Maeva (graduate assistant)

Legend

- (C) Team captain
- (S) Suspended
- (I) Ineligible
- Injured
- Redshirt

Roster
Last update: August 20, 2024

== Game summaries ==
=== Texas A&M-Commerce (FCS) ===
Texas A&M–Commerce Lions (FCS) (0–0) vs San Diego State Aztecs (0–0) – Game summary

Quarter	1	2	3	4	Total
Lions (FCS)	0	6	8	0	14
Aztecs	3	0	21	21	45

at Snapdragon Stadium, San Diego, California

- Date: August 31, 2024
- Game time: 5:00 pm PDT
- Game weather: 79 °F (26 °C), sunny, wind N 4 mph
- Game attendance: 25,180
- Referee: Patrick Frey
- TV announcers (TruTV/Max): Ari Wolfe (play-by-play), Darius Walker (analyst), and Jared Greenberg (sideline)

Game information

First quarter

- SDSU (0:28) – Gabriel Plascencia 50 yard field goal; 16 plays, 48 yards, 5:27 (San Diego State 3-0)

Second quarter

- TAMC (0:59) – EJ Oakmon 1 yard run (Andy Gallegos PAT failed); 10 plays, 75 yards, 4:08 (Texas A&M–Commerce 6-3)

Third quarter

- SDSU (11:34) – Marquez Cooper 47 yard run (Nick Lopez kick); 6 plays, 66 yards, 1:54 (San Diego State 10-6)
- SDSU (10:47) – Tano Letuli fumble recovery in the end zone (Gabriel Plascencia PAT failed); (San Diego State 16-6)
- SDSU (6:36) – Louis Brown IV 44 yard pass from Danny O’Neil (Michael Harrison run for two-point conversion); 3 plays, 62 yards, 0:44 (San Diego State 24-6)
- TAMC (2:17) – Drew Allison 6 yard pass from Eric Rodriguez (Eric Rodriguez pass to JaiSean McMillan for two-point conversion); 8 plays, 65 yards, 4:18 (San Diego State 24-14)

Fourth quarter

- SDSU (14:55) – Marquez Cooper 7 yard run (Nick Lopez kick); 7 plays, 95 yards, 2:17 (San Diego State 31-14)
- SDSU (13:48) – JD Coffey III 45 yard interception return (Nick Lopez kick); (San Diego State 38-14)
- SDSU (6:57) – Jordan Napier 8 yard pass from Danny O’Neil (Nick Lopez kick); 7 plays, 79 yards, 4:28 (San Diego State 45-14)

Statistics	Lions	Aztecs
First downs	17	23
Plays–yards	59–180	73–468
Rushes–yards	34–63	40–254
Passing yards	117	214
Passing: comp–att–int	18–25–1	22–33–0
Turnovers		
Time of possession	31:28	28:32

Team	Category	Player	Statistics
Texas A&M–Commerce	Passing	Eric Rodriguez	14/20, 105 yards, 1 TD, 1 INT
Texas A&M–Commerce	Rushing	EJ Oakmon	8 carries, 30 yards, 1 TD
Texas A&M–Commerce	Receiving	Dayan Bilbo	2 receptions, 35 yards
San Diego State	Passing	Danny O'Neil	22/33, 214 yards, 2 TD
San Diego State	Rushing	Marquez Cooper	27 carries, 223 yards, 2 TD
San Diego State	Receiving	Louis Brown IV	3 receptions, 91 yards, 1 TD

=== Oregon State ===
Oregon State Beavers (1–0) vs San Diego State Aztecs (1–0) – Game summary

Quarter	1	2	3	4	Total
Beavers	7	0	0	14	21
Aztecs	0	0	0	0	0

at Snapdragon Stadium, San Diego, California

- Date: September 7, 2024
- Game time: 7:30 pm PDT
- Game weather: 87 °F (31 °C), clear skies, no wind
- Game attendance: 25,318
- Referee: Cal McNeil
- TV announcers (CBSSN): Rich Waltz (play-by-play), Robert Turbin (analyst), and Amanda Guerra (sideline)

Game information

First quarter

- ORST (11:47) – Jam Griffin 16 yard run (Everett Hayes kick); 5 plays, 53 yards, 1:53 (Oregon State 7-0)

Second quarter

None

Third quarter

None

Fourth quarter

- ORST (14:53) – Anthony Hankerson 15 yard run (Everett Hayes kick); 13 plays, 98 yards, 8:04 (Oregon State 14-0)
- ORST (4:36) – Bryce Caufield 21 yard pass from Gevani McCoy (Everett Hayes kick); 5 plays, 42 yards, 2:58 (Oregon State 21-0)

Statistics	Beavers	Aztecs
First downs	23	7
Plays–yards	78–420	49–179
Rushes–yards	51–237	25–72
Passing yards	183	107
Passing: comp–att–int	17–27–0	11–24–0
Turnovers		
Time of possession	41:07	18:53

Team	Category	Player	Statistics
Oregon State	Passing	Gevani McCoy	16/26, 181 yards, 1 TD
Oregon State	Rushing	Jam Griffin	18 carries, 89 yards, 1 TD
Oregon State	Receiving	Trent Walker	8 receptions, 92 yards
San Diego State	Passing	Danny O'Neil	11/24, 107 yards
San Diego State	Rushing	Marquez Cooper	13 carries, 53 yards
San Diego State	Receiving	Louis Brown IV	2 receptions, 45 yards

=== at California ===
San Diego State Aztecs (1–1) at California Golden Bears (2–0) – Game summary

Quarter	1	2	3	4	Total
Aztecs	3	0	0	7	10
Golden Bears	7	0	14	10	31

at California Memorial Stadium, Berkeley, California

- Date: September 14, 2024
- Game time: 7:30 pm PDT
- Game weather: 60 °F (16 °C), sunny, wind SW 8 mph
- Game attendance: 35,197
- Referee: Patrick Foy
- TV announcers (ESPN): Dave Flemming (play-by-play), Brock Osweiler (analyst), and Stormy Buonantony (sideline)

Game information

First quarter

- SDSU (5:42) – Nick Lopez 29 yard field goal; 8 plays, 29 yards, 3:40 (San Diego State 3-0)
- CAL (2:25) – Fernando Mendoza 8 yard run; 7 plays, 69 yards, 3:17 (California 7-3)

Second quarter

None

Third quarter

- CAL (9:36) – Kadarius Calloway 7 yard run; 8 plays, 85 yards, 3:55 (California 14-3)
- CAL (1:30) – Corey Dyches 20 yard pass from Fernando Mendoza; 13 plays, 90 yards, 5:37 (California 21-3)

Fourth quarter

- CAL (13:33) – Ryan Coe 48 yard field goal; 5 plays, -5 yards, 1:50 (California 24-3)
- SDSU (11:05) – Jordan Napier 40 yard pass from Javance Tupou'ata-Johnson; 7 plays, 75 yards, 2:28 (California 24-10)
- CAL (9:48) – Nyziah Hunter 15 yard pass from Fernando Mendoza; 3 yards, 75 yards, 1:17 (California 31-10)

Statistics	Aztecs	Golden Bears
First downs	16	21
Plays–yards	65–276	71–473
Rushes–yards	35–110	42–275
Passing yards	166	198
Passing: comp–att–int	14–30–2	21–29–1
Turnovers		
Time of possession	27:15	32:45

Team	Category	Player	Statistics
San Diego State	Passing	Javance Tupou'ata-Johnson	13/29, 156 yards, 1 TD, 2 INT
San Diego State	Rushing	Marquez Cooper	22 carries, 87 yards
San Diego State	Receiving	Jordan Napier	2 receptions, 53 yards, 1 TD
California	Passing	Fernando Mendoza	21/29, 198 yards, 2 TD, 1 INT
California	Rushing	Jaivian Thomas	17 carries, 169 yards
California	Receiving	Nyziah Hunter	4 receptions, 52 yards, 1 TD

=== at Central Michigan ===
San Diego State Aztecs (1–2) at Central Michigan Chippewas (2–2) – Game summary

Quarter	1	2	3	4	Total
Aztecs	7	14	0	0	21
Chippewas	10	3	6	3	22

at Kelly/Shorts Stadium, Mount Pleasant, Michigan

- Date: September 28, 2024
- Game time: 12:30 pm PDT
- Game weather: 76 °F (24 °C), cloudy, wind NE 11 mph
- Game attendance: 27,072
- Referee: Kenneth Ray
- TV announcers (CBSSN): Chris Lewis (play-by-play) and Taylor McHargue (analyst)

Game information

First quarter

- CMU (12:26) – Tristan Mattson 25 yard field goal; 6 plays, 61 yards, 2:28 (Central Michigan 3-0)
- SDSU (6:13) – Marquez Cooper 3 yard run (Nick Lopez kick); 6 plays, 75 yards, 1:56 (San Diego State 7-3)
- CMU (0:31) – Marion Lukes 8 yard pass from Joe Labas (Tristan Mattson kick); 12 plays, 75 yards, 5:42 (Central Michigan 10-7)

Second quarter

- SDSU (12:43) – Jude Wolfe 5 yard pass from Danny O'Neil (Nick Lopez kick); 4 plays, 17 yards, 1:07 (San Diego State 14-10)
- SDSU (3:30) – Jude Wolfe 26 yard pass from Danny O'Neil (Nick Lopez kick); 3 plays, 73 yards, 0:53 (San Diego State 21-10)
- CMU (0:26) – Tristan Mattson 34 yard field goal; 12 plays, 59 yards, 3:04 (San Diego State 21-13)

Third quarter

- CMU (5:52) – B.J. Harris 1 yard run (Two-point run conversion failed); 15 plays, 77 yards, 7:29 (San Diego State 21-19)

Fourth quarter

- CMU (0:05) – Tristan Mattson 46 yard field goal; 15 plays, 52 yards, 1:51 (Central Michigan 22-21)

Statistics	Aztecs	Chippewas
First downs	21	26
Plays–yards	68–364	88–452
Rushes–yards	45–118	42–154
Passing yards	246	298
Passing: comp–att–int	14–23–0	25–46–1
Turnovers		
Time of possession	24:33	35:27

Team	Category	Player	Statistics
San Diego State	Passing	Danny O'Neil	14/23, 246 yards, 2 TD
San Diego State	Rushing	Marquez Cooper	34 carries, 111 yards, 1 TD
San Diego State	Receiving	Louis Brown IV	8 receptions, 149 yards
Central Michigan	Passing	Joe Labas	24/43, 275 yards, 1 TD, 1 INT
Central Michigan	Rushing	Marion Lukes	16 carries, 76 yards
Central Michigan	Receiving	Gavin Harris	2 receptions, 66 yards

=== Hawaii ===
Hawaii Rainbow Warriors (2–2) vs San Diego State Aztecs (1–3) – Game summary

Quarter	1	2	3	4	Total
Rainbow Warriors	3	7	7	7	24
Aztecs	3	14	3	7	27

at Snapdragon Stadium, San Diego, California

- Date: October 5, 2024
- Game time: 5:00 pm PDT
- Game weather: 71 °F (22 °C), hazy, wind N 5 mph
- Game attendance: 31,307
- Referee: Christian Watson
- TV announcers (CBSSN): Chris Lewis (play-by-play) and Robert Turbin (analyst)

Game information

First quarter

- SDSU (5:35) – Gabriel Plascencia 24 yard field goal; 16 plays, 53 yards, 6:38 (San Diego State 3-0)
- HAW (0:43) – Kansei Matsuzawa 30 yard field goal; 15 plays, 77 yards, 4:49 (Tied 3-3)

Second quarter

- SDSU (4:49) – Marquez Cooper 9 yard rush (Gabriel Plascencia kick); 8 plays, 55 yards, 3:37 (San Diego State 10-3)
- HAW (1:53) – Tylan Hines 23 yard pass from Brayden Schager (Kansei Matsuzawa kick); 6 plays, 77 yards, 2:50 (Tied 10-10)
- SDSU (0:06) — Louis Brown IV 15 yard pass from Danny O’Neil (Gabriel Plascencia kick); 9 plays, 75 yards, 1:47 (San Diego State 17-10)

Third quarter

- SDSU (8:33) — Gabriel Plascencia 43 yard field goal; 10 plays, 19 yards, 4:40 (San Diego State 20-10)
- HAW (2:06) — Pofele Ashlock 6 yard pass from Brayden Schager (Kansei Matsuzawa kick); 12 plays, 75 yards, 6:27 (San Diego State 20-17)

Fourth quarter

- HAW (9:39) — Nick Cenacle 23 yard pass from Brayden Schager (Kansei Matsuzawa kick); 14 plays, 89 yards, 5:48 (Hawaii 24-20)
- SDSU (7:05) — Marquez Cooper 2 yard rush (Gabriel Plascencia kick); 8 plays, 87 yards, 2:30 (San Diego State 27-20)

Statistics	Warriors	Aztecs
First downs	24	19
Plays–yards	73–356	67–323
Rushes–yards	29–84	34–99
Passing yards	272	224
Passing: comp–att–int	26–44–1	24–33–0
Turnovers		
Time of possession	30:56	29:04

Team	Category	Player	Statistics
Hawaii	Passing	Brayden Schager	26/44, 272 yards, 3 TD, 1 INT
Hawaii	Rushing	Landon Sims	8 carries, 36 yards
Hawaii	Receiving	Pofele Ashlock	8 receptions, 77 yards, 1 TD
San Diego State	Passing	Danny O'Neil	24/33, 224 yards, 1 TD
San Diego State	Rushing	Marquez Cooper	30 carries, 109 yards, 2 TD
San Diego State	Receiving	Nate Bennett	4 receptions, 74 yards

=== at Wyoming ===
San Diego State Aztecs (2–3) at Wyoming Cowboys (1–4) – Game summary

Quarter	1	2	3	4	Total
Aztecs	10	7	0	10	27
Cowboys	7	7	3	7	24

at War Memorial Stadium, Laramie, Wyoming

- Date: October 12, 2024
- Game time: 12:30 pm PDT
- Game weather: 71 °F (22 °C), sunny, wind NW 9 mph
- Game attendance: 23,155
- Referee: Jonathan Noli
- TV announcers (CBSSN): Chris Lewis (play-by-play) and Taylor McHargue (analyst)

Game information

First quarter

- SDSU (6:27) – Gabriel Plascencia 22 yard field goal; 4 plays, 6 yards, 1:21 (San Diego State 3-0)
- WYO (5:46) – Jaylen Sargent 70 yard pass from Evan Svoboda (John Hoyland kick); 2 plays, 75 yards, 0:41 (Wyoming 7-3)
- SDSU (0:02) – Eric Butler 43 yard interception return (Gabriel Plascencia kick); 2 plays, 19 yards, 0:29 (San Diego State 10-7)

Second quarter

- WYO (9:08) – Sam Scott 1 yard run (John Hoyland kick); 12 plays, 75 yards, 5:54 (Wyoming 14-10)
- SDSU (5:14) – Marquez Cooper 4 yard run (Gabriel Plascencia kick); 8 plays, 75 yards, 3:54 (San Diego State 17-14)

Third quarter

- WYO (10:05) – John Hoyland 42 yard field goal; 15 plays, 50 yards, 4:55 (Tied 17-17)

Fourth quarter

- WYO (14:50) – Evan Svoboda 51 yard run (John Hoyland kick); 6 plays, 78 yards, 2:17 (Wyoming 24-17)
- SDSU (13:54) – Jordan Napier 27 yard pass from Danny O'Neil; 4 plays, 80 yards, 0:49 (Tied 24-24)
- SDSU (7:35) – Gabriel Plascencia 28 yard field goal; 7 plays, 77 yards, 3:36 (San Diego State 27-24)

Statistics	Aztecs	Cowboys
First downs	16	19
Plays–yards	62–356	72–371
Rushes–yards	35–102	41–190
Passing yards	254	181
Passing: comp–att–int	16–27–1	12–31–2
Turnovers		
Time of possession	29:17	30:43

Team	Category	Player	Statistics
San Diego State	Passing	Danny O'Neil	16/27, 254 yards, 1 TD, 1 INT
San Diego State	Rushing	Marquez Cooper	25 carries, 87 yards, 1 TD
San Diego State	Receiving	Jordan Napier	4 receptions, 91 yards, 1 TD
Wyoming	Passing	Evan Svoboda	12/31, 181 yards, 1 TD, 2 INT
Wyoming	Rushing	Sam Scott	20 carries, 94 yards, 1 TD
Wyoming	Receiving	Jaylen Sargent	2 receptions, 84 yards, 1 TD

=== Washington State ===
Washington State Cougars (6–1) vs San Diego State Aztecs (3–3) – Game summary

Quarter	1	2	3	4	Total
Cougars	7	7	0	15	29
Aztecs	6	6	7	7	26

at Snapdragon Stadium, San Diego, California

- Date: October 26, 2024
- Game time: 7:30 pm PDT
- Game weather: 67 °F (19 °C), clear, wind N 2 mph
- Game attendance: 26,937
- Referee: John Love
- TV announcers (CBSSN): Carter Blackburn (play-by-play) and Taylor McHargue (analyst)

Game information

First quarter

- WSU (12:26) – Cooper Mathers 26 yard pass from John Mateer (Dean Janikowski kick); 5 plays, 65 yards, 1:37 (Washington State 7-0)
- SDSU (8:54) – Gabriel Plascencia 46 yard field goal; 10 plays, 47 yards, 3:32 (Washington State 7-3)
- SDSU (0:00) – Gabriel Plascencia 28 yard field goal; 10 plays, 60 yards, 5:03 (Washington State 7-6)

Second quarter

- WSU (7:19) – John Mateer 1 yard run (Dean Janikowski kick); 16 plays, 74 yards, 7:37 (Washington State 14-6)
- SDSU (0:17) – Marquez Cooper 7 yard run (Two-point run conversion failed); 6 plays, 60 yards, 1:41 (Washington State 14-12)

Third quarter

- SDSU (7:05) – Nate Bennett 27 yard pass from Jordan Napier (Gabriel Plascencia kick); 3 plays, 43 yards, 1:06 (San Diego State 19-14)

Fourth quarter

- SDSU (13:39) – Marquez Cooper 1 yard run (Gabriel Plascencia Kick); 11 plays, 69 yards, 5:23 (San Diego State 26-14)
- WSU (12:08) – Carlos Hernandez 34 yard pass from John Mateer (Dean Janikowski kick); 4 plays, 80 yards, 1:27 (San Diego State 26-21)
- WSU (5:03) – John Mateer 2 yard run (John Mateer pass to Kris Hutson for two-point conversion); 7 plays, 63 yards, 3:28 (Washington State 29-26)

Statistics	Cougars	Aztecs
First downs	22	21
Plays–yards	67–371	71–414
Rushes–yards	40–114	30–130
Passing yards	257	284
Passing: comp–att–int	19–27–0	28–41–1
Turnovers		
Time of possession	26:14	29:33

Team	Category	Player	Statistics
Washington State	Passing	John Mateer	19/27, 257 yards, 2 TD
Washington State	Rushing	John Mateer	21 carries, 42 yards, 2 TD
Washington State	Receiving	Kyle Williams	5 receptions, 74 yards
San Diego State	Passing	Danny O'Neil	22/34, 195 yards, 1 INT
San Diego State	Rushing	Marquez Cooper	18 carries, 78 yards, 2 TD
San Diego State	Receiving	Ja'Shaun Poke	10 receptions, 80 yards

=== at No. 15 Boise State ===
San Diego State Aztecs (3–4) at No. 15 Boise State Broncos (6–1) – Game summary

Quarter	1	2	3	4	Total
Aztecs	0	10	0	14	24
No. 15 Broncos	21	14	7	14	56

at Albertsons Stadium, Boise, Idaho

- Date: November 1, 2024
- Game time: 5:00 pm PDT
- Game weather: 55 °F (13 °C), cloudy, wind SE 17 mph
- Game attendance: 36,838
- Referee: Kenneth Ray
- TV announcers (FS1): Trent Rush (play-by-play) and Petros Papadakis (analyst)

Game information

First quarter

- BSU (10:34) – Latrell Caples 18 yard pass from Maddux Madsen (Jonah Dalmas kick); 8 plays, 66 yards, 3:35 (Boise State 7-0)
- BSU (1:39) – Latrell Caples 19 yard pass from Maddux Madsen (Jonah Dalmas kick); 10 plays, 75 yards, 5:48 (Boise State 14-0)
- BSU (1:31) – A'Marion McCoy 35 yard interception return (Jonah Dalmas kick); (Boise State 21-0)

Second quarter

- BSU (11:35) – Prince Strachan 14 yard pass from Maddux Madsen (Jonah Dalmas kick); 9 plays, 58 yards, 3:34 (Boise State 28-0)
- SDSU (9:12) – Gabriel Plascencia 27 yard field goal; 8 plays, 52 yards, 2:19 (Boise State 28-3)
- SDSU (5:58) – Marquez Cooper 6 yard run (Gabriel Plascencia kick); 5 plays, 65 yards, 1:42 (Boise State 28-10)
- BSU (0:22) – Latrell Caples 14 yard pass from Maddux Madsen (Jonah Dalmas kick); 13 plays, 75 yards, 5:36 (Boise State 35-10)

Third quarter

- BSU (10:13) – Ashton Jeanty 4 yard run (Jonah Dalmas kick); 9 plays, 75 yards, 4:47 (Boise State 42-10)

Fourth quarter

- BSU (13:03) – Ashton Jeanty 4 yard run (Jonah Dalmas kick); 13 plays, 90 yards, 6:27 (Boise State 49-10)
- SDSU (7:35) – Jordan Napier 30 yard pass from Danny O'Neil (Gabriel Plascencia kick); 16 plays, 75 yards, 5:28 (Boise State 49-17)
- BSU (3:03) – Tyler Crowe 2 yard run (Jonah Dalmas kick); 8 plays, 75 yards, 4:32 (Boise State 56-17)
- SDSU (0:30) – Mekhi Shaw 30 yard pass from Danny O'Neil (Gabriel Plascencia kick); 7 plays, 54 yards, 2:21 (Boise State 56-24)

Statistics	Aztecs	Broncos
First downs	12	34
Plays–yards	56–256	80–541
Rushes–yards	26–101	46–219
Passing yards	155	322
Passing: comp–att–int	14–30–2	26–34–0
Turnovers		
Time of possession	20:28	39:32

Team	Category	Player	Statistics
San Diego State	Passing	Danny O'Neil	14/30, 155 yards, 2 TD, 2 INT
San Diego State	Rushing	Marquez Cooper	16 carries, 94 yards, 1 TD
San Diego State	Receiving	Jordan Napier	8 receptions, 79 yards, 1 TD
Boise State	Passing	Maddux Madsen	24/32, 307 yards, 4 TD
Boise State	Rushing	Ashton Jeanty	31 carries, 149 yards, 2 TD
Boise State	Receiving	Latrell Caples	6 receptions, 90 yards, 3 TD

=== New Mexico ===
New Mexico Lobos (3–6) vs San Diego State Aztecs (3–5) – Game summary

Quarter	1	2	3	4	Total
Lobos	14	0	0	7	21
Aztecs	3	10	3	0	16

at Snapdragon Stadium, San Diego, California

- Date: November 8, 2024
- Game time: 7:30 pm PST
- Game weather: 58 °F (14 °C), clear, wind N 1 mph
- Game attendance: 21,832
- Referee: Michael Cuttone
- TV announcers (FS1): Dan Hellie (play-by-play) and Petros Papadakis (analyst)

Game information

First quarter

- UNM (8:46) – Eli Sanders 51 yard run (Luke Drzewiecki kick); 4 plays, 99 yards, 1:24 (New Mexico 7-0)
- SDSU (3:08) – Gabriel Plascencia 22 yard field goal; 13 plays, 71 yards, 5:32 (New Mexico 7-3)
- UNM (2:32) – Eli Sanders 68 yard run (Luke Drzewiecki kick); 2 plays, 81 yards, 0:32 (New Mexico 14-3)

Second quarter

- SDSU (14:52) – Gabriel Plascencia 31 yard field goal; 7 plays, 15 yards, 2:24 (New Mexico 14-6)
- SDSU (2:37) – Marquez Cooper 5 yard pass from Danny O'Neil (Gabriel Plascencia kick); 8 plays, 61 yards, 2:41 (New Mexico 14-13)

Third quarter

- SDSU (1:39) – Gabriel Plascencia 28 yard field goal; 16 plays, 80 yards, 5:20 (San Diego State 16-14)

Fourth quarter

- UNM (13:07) – Ryan Davis 8 yard pass from Devon Dampier (Luke Drzewiecki kick); 9 plays, 65 yards, 3:25 (New Mexico 21-16)

Statistics	Lobos	Aztecs
First downs	21	26
Plays–yards	59–475	88–341
Rushes–yards	35–300	46–146
Passing yards	175	195
Passing: comp–att–int	16–24–0	26–42–0
Turnovers		
Time of possession	24:58	35:02

Team	Category	Player	Statistics
New Mexico	Passing	Devon Dampier	16/24, 175 yards, 1 TD
New Mexico	Rushing	Eli Sanders	16 carries, 173 yards, 2 TD
New Mexico	Receiving	Ryan Davis	5 receptions, 47 yards, 1 TD
San Diego State	Passing	Danny O'Neil	26/41, 195 yards, 1 TD
San Diego State	Rushing	Marquez Cooper	35 carries, 123 yards
San Diego State	Receiving	Jordan Napier	9 receptions, 63 yards

=== at UNLV ===
San Diego State Aztecs (3–6) at UNLV Rebels (7–2) – Game summary

Quarter	1	2	3	4	Total
Aztecs	0	6	7	7	20
Rebels	7	21	10	3	41

at Allegiant Stadium, Paradise, Nevada

- Date: November 16, 2024
- Game time: 7:30 pm PST
- Game weather: 51 °F (11 °C), indoor
- Game attendance: 30,386
- Referee: Michael Cuttone
- TV announcers (CBSSN): Carter Blackburn (play-by-play), Randy Cross (analyst), and Keiana Martin (sideline)

Game information

First quarter

- UNLV (4:05) – Kaleo Ballungay 2 yard pass from Hajj-Malik Williams (Caden Chittenden kick); 4 plays, 50 yards, 2:08 (UNLV 7-0)

Second quarter

- UNLV (14:24) – Greg Burrell 20 yard run (Caden Chittenden kick); 9 plays, 70 yards, 3:02 (UNLV 14-0)
- UNLV (9:20) – Jai'Den Thomas 4 yard run (Caden Chittenden kick); 6 plays, 38 yards, 2:12 (UNLV 21-0)
- SDSU (3:25) – Louis Brown IV 29 yard pass from Danny O'Neil (Two-point pass conversion failed); 5 plays, 40 yards, 2:07 (UNLV 21-6)
- UNLV (0:16) – Hajj-Malik Williams 12 yard run (Caden Chittenden kick); 5 plays, 47 yards, 0:45 (UNLV 28-6)

Third quarter

- UNLV (9:40) – Hajj-Malik Williams 7 yard run (Caden Chittenden kick); 8 plays, 73 yards, 3:48 (UNLV 35-6)
- SDSU (8:22) – Ja'Shaun Poke 46 yard pass from Danny O'Neil (Gabriel Plascencia kick); 4 plays, 75 yards, 1:18 (UNLV 35-13)
- UNLV (6:46) – Caden Chittenden 46 yard field goal; 5 plays, 47 yards, 1:36 (UNLV 38-13)

Fourth quarter

- SDSU (13:46) – Danny O'Neil 1 yard run (Gabriel Plascencia kick); 8 plays, 35 yards, 3:06 (UNLV 38-20)
- UNLV (9:37) – Caden Chittenden 21 yard field goal; 10 plays, 72 yards, 5:02 (UNLV 41-20)

Statistics	Aztecs	Rebels
First downs	14	26
Plays–yards	58–270	79–515
Rushes–yards	35–107	47–253
Passing yards	163	262
Passing: comp–att–int	14–23–2	23–32–0
Turnovers		
Time of possession	23:58	36:55

Team	Category	Player	Statistics
San Diego State	Passing	Danny O'Neil	13/22, 162 yards, 2 TD, 2 INT
San Diego State	Rushing	Marquez Cooper	26 carries, 97 yards
San Diego State	Receiving	Ja'Shaun Poke	3 receptions, 79 yards, 1 TD
UNLV	Passing	Hajj-Malik Williams	20/29, 244 yards, 1 TD
UNLV	Rushing	Greg Burrell	10 carries, 58 yards, 1 TD
UNLV	Receiving	Jacob De Jesus	7 receptions, 75 yards

=== at Utah State ===
San Diego State Aztecs (3–7) at Utah State Aggies (3–7) – Game summary

Quarter	1	2	3	4	Total
Aztecs	3	10	0	7	20
Aggies	0	14	7	20	41

at Maverik Stadium, Logan, Utah

- Date: November 23, 2024
- Game time: 12:30 pm PST
- Game attendance: 12,583
- Referee: Patrick Foy
- TV announcers (CBSSN): Chris Lewis (play-by-play) and Taylor McHargue (analyst)

Game information

First quarter

- SDSU (0:00) – Gabriel Plascencia 35 yard field goal; 9 plays, 65 yards, 4:22 (San Diego State 3-0)

Second quarter

- SDSU (7:49) – Marquez Cooper 14 yard run (Gabriel Plascencia kick); 6 plays, 46 yards, 2:26 (San Diego State 10-0)
- SDSU (3:16) – Gabriel Plascencia 30 yard field goal; 7 plays, 21 yards, 3:16 (San Diego State 13-0)
- USU (1:53) – Bryson Barnes 19 yard run (Tanner Cragun kick); 4 plays, 65 yards, 1:23 (San Diego State 13-7)
- USU (0:16) – Grant Page 9 yard pass from Bryson Barnes (Tanner Cragun kick); 8 plays, 65 yards, 1:17 (Utah State 14-13)

Third quarter

- USU (10:58) – Josh Sterzer 10 yard pass from Bryson Barnes (Tanner Cragun kick); 8 plays, 75 yards, 4:02 (Utah State 21-13)

Fourth quarter

- USU (12:26) – Grant Page 6 yard pass from Bryson Barnes (Tanner Cragun PAT failed); 9 plays, 80 yards, 3:50 (Utah State 27-13)
- USU (8:07) – Kyrese White 5 yard run (Tanner Cragun kick); 4 plays, 80 yards, 1:25 (Utah State 34-13)
- USU (3:08) – Herschel Turner 1 yard run (Tanner Cragun kick); 6 plays, 41 yards, 3:10 (Utah State 41-13)
- SDSU (0:32) – Mekhi Shaw 12 yard pass from Javance Tupou'ata-Johnson (Gabriel Plascencia kick); 11 plays, 75 yards, 2:36 (Utah State 41-20)

Statistics	Aztecs	Aggies
First downs	23	25
Plays–yards	74–412	72–488
Rushes–yards	38–188	50–322
Passing yards	224	166
Passing: comp–att–int	26–36–0	18–22–1
Turnovers		
Time of possession	30:26	29:34

Team	Category	Player	Statistics
San Diego State	Passing	Danny O'Neil	23/31, 199 yards
San Diego State	Rushing	Marquez Cooper	23 carries, 118 yards, 1 TD
San Diego State	Receiving	Louis Brown IV	7 receptions, 114 yards
Utah State	Passing	Bryson Barnes	13/15, 139 yards, 3 TD
Utah State	Rushing	Bryson Barnes	15 carries, 193 yards, 1 TD
Utah State	Receiving	Kyrese White	6 receptions, 67 yards

=== Air Force ===
Air Force Falcons (4–7) vs San Diego State Aztecs (3–8) – Game summary

Quarter	1	2	3	4	Total
Falcons	14	3	14	0	31
Aztecs	7	7	0	6	20

at Snapdragon Stadium, San Diego, California

- Date: November 30, 2024
- Game time: 7:30pm PST
- Game weather: 58 °F (14 °C), clear, calm wind
- Game attendance: 18,045
- Referee: Jonathan Noli
- TV announcers (FS1): Evan Lepler (play-by-play) and Charles Arbuckle (analyst)

Game information

First quarter

- AFA (10:02) – Dylan Carson 1 yard run (Matthew Dapore kick); 9 plays, 81 yards, 4:55 (Air Force 7-0)
- SDSU (6:00) – Marquez Cooper 7 yard run (Gabriel Plascencia kick); 10 plays, 76 yards, 3:57 (Tied 7-7)
- AFA (0:29) – Quentin Hayes 1 yard run (Matthew Dapore kick); 10 plays, 75 yards, 5:31 (Air Force 14-7)

Second quarter

- AFA (6:31) – Matthew Dapore 45 yard field goal; 10 plays, 62 yards, 6:02 (Air Force 17-7)
- SDSU (6:00) – Marquez Cooper 2 yard run (Gabriel Plascencia kick); 14 plays, 83 yards, 6:01 (Air Force 17-14)

Third quarter

- AFA (8:03) – Cade Harris 76 yard pass from Quentin Hayes (Matthew Dapore kick); 4 plays, 88 yards, 2:01 (Air Force 24-14)
- AFA (1:00) – Dylan Carson 14 yard run (Matthew Dapore kick); 10 plays, 66 yards, 5:37 (Air Force 31-14)

Fourth quarter

- SDSU (13:54) – Marquez Cooper 8 yard pass from Danny O'Neil (Two-point run conversion failed); 7 plays, 74 yards, 2:00 (Air Force 31-20)

Statistics	Falcons	Aztecs
First downs	21	24
Plays–yards	54–404	68–356
Rushes–yards	52–276	35–120
Passing yards	128	236
Passing: comp–att–int	2–2–0	25–33–0
Turnovers		
Time of possession	31:21	28:39

Team	Category	Player	Statistics
Air Force	Passing	Quentin Hayes	1/1, 76 yards, 1 TD
Air Force	Rushing	Dylan Carson	24 carries, 125 yards, 2 TD
Air Force	Receiving	Cade Harris	1 reception, 76 yards, 1 TD
San Diego State	Passing	Danny O'Neil	24/32, 230 yards, 1 TD
San Diego State	Rushing	Marquez Cooper	23 carries, 94 yards, 2 TD
San Diego State	Receiving	Louis Brown IV	3 receptions, 60 yards
