= Omari Evans =

American football player (born 2003)

No. 80 – Kansas City Chiefs
- Position: Wide receiver
- Roster status: Practice squad

Personal information
- Born: December 31, 2003 (age 22); Killeen, Texas, U.S.
- Listed height: 6 ft 0 in (1.83 m)
- Listed weight: 195 lb (88 kg)

Career information
- High school: Shoemaker (Killeen, Texas)
- College: Penn State (2022–2024); Washington (2025)
- NFL draft: 2026: undrafted

Career history
- Kansas City Chiefs (2026–present)*
- * Offseason or practice squad member only
- Stats at Pro Football Reference

Donovan Omari Evans (born December 31, 2003) is an American football wide receiver for the Kansas City Chiefs of the National Football League (NFL). He played college football for the Penn State Nittany Lions and Washington Huskies.

== Early life ==
Evans attended Shoemaker High School in Killeen, Texas. Coming out of high school, he was ranked as a three-star recruit by 247Sports, and committed to play college football for the Penn State Nittany Lions.

== College career ==
=== Penn State ===
As a freshman in 2022, Evans appeared in all 13 games, recording five catches for 55 yards and a touchdown. In 2023, he tallied four receptions for 94 yards and a touchdown. In the 2024 season opener, Evans hauled in a 55-yard pass in a win over West Virginia. In the 2024 Fiesta Bowl, he tallied two catches for 55 yards and a touchdown in a victory versus Boise State. Evans finished the 2024 season with 21 receptions for 415 yards and five touchdowns. After the conclusion of the season, he entered the NCAA transfer portal.

=== Washington ===
Evans transferred to play for the Washington Huskies. He finished the 2025 season with 17 receptions for 254 yards and one touchdown.

== Professional career ==
Pre-draft measurables
Height	Weight	Arm length	Hand span	Wingspan	40-yard dash	10-yard split	20-yard split	20-yard shuttle	Three-cone drill	Vertical jump	Broad jump	Bench press
6 ft 0 3/8 in (1.84 m)	190 lb (86 kg)	30 3/4 in (0.78 m)	8 7/8 in (0.23 m)	6 ft 0 1/8 in (1.83 m)	4.30 s	1.53 s	2.52 s	4.25 s	6.95 s	41.0 in (1.04 m)	10 ft 7 in (3.23 m)	15 reps
All values from Pro Day

After not being selected in the 2026 NFL draft, Evans signed with the Kansas City Chiefs as an undrafted free agent. On August 30, 2026, Evans was waived by Kansas City as a part of final roster cuts; he was re-signed to the team's practice squad the next day.
