= Marco Notarainni =

American football player

No. 53 – Boise State Broncos
- Position: Linebacker
- Class: Redshirt Senior

Personal information
- Listed height: 6 ft 3 in (1.91 m)
- Listed weight: 240 lb (109 kg)

Career information
- High school: Torrey Pines (San Diego, California)
- College: Boise State (2021–2025)

Awards and highlights
- First-team All-Mountain West (2024)
- Stats at ESPN

Marco Notarainni is an American college football linebacker for the Boise State Broncos.

== Early life ==
Notarainni attended high school at Torrey Pines located in San Diego, California. Coming out of high school, he was rated as a three star recruit, where he committed to play college football for the Boise State Broncos over offers from other schools such as Columbia, New Mexico, Oregon State, and Utah State.

== College career ==
In his first collegiate season in 2021, Notarainni used the season to redshirt. During the 2022 season, he played in two games, recording two tackles. Notarainni entered the 2023 season as a backup, but after an injury to starter DJ Schramm, he was thrust into the starting lineup. In week three of the 2023 season, he tallied 13 tackles and a sack in a victory over North Dakota. Notarainni finished the 2023 season, making five total starts, where he recorded 53 tackles. In week ten of the 2024 season, he rushed for six yards on a fake punt conversion, as he helped the Broncos to a victory over San Diego State. During the 2024 season, he recorded 60 tackles, three and a half sacks, three pass deflections, and two fumble recoveries, where for his performance he was named first team all-Mountain West. Heading into the 2025 season, Notarainni was named to the preseason all-conference team, as well as being nominated for the Wuerffel Trophy, and for the Allstate AFCA Good Works Team. He also enters the season as a projected selection in the 2026 NFL draft.
