= Tyler Stockton =

American college football coach

Current position
- Title: Safeties coach
- Team: Michigan
- Conference: Big Ten

Biographical details
- Born: Linwood, New Jersey, U.S.
- Education: University of Notre Dame (B.B.A., M.B.A.)

Playing career
- 2009–2013: Notre Dame
- Position: Defensive lineman

Coaching career (HC unless noted)
- 2014–2015: UConn (GA)
- 2016–2017: Western Illinois (DL/RGC)
- 2018: Western Illinois (DC/OLB)
- 2019–2021: Ball State (DC/ILB)
- 2022–2023: Ball State (AHC/DC/ILB)
- 2024–2025: Boise State (co-DC/S)
- 2026–present: Michigan (S)

Tyler Stockton is an American college football coach and former player, currently the safeties coach at the University of Michigan. He was previously a coach at the University of Connecticut, Western Illinois University, Ball State University and Boise State University. Stockton played as a defensive lineman for the Notre Dame Fighting Irish from 2009 to 2013.

== Playing career ==
Stockton was rated as a four-star recruit by 247Sports and was the top-rated commit in the class of 2009 in New Jersey. ESPN rated him as the third-best defensive tackle in the nation. Raised in Linwood, New Jersey, he played his high school football at the Hun School of Princeton, located in Princeton, New Jersey. He was named to the all-state first team by the Newark Star-Ledger following his junior year. On April 19, 2008, Stockton committed to Notre Dame, picking the Fighting Irish over other offers from California, North Carolina, Penn State, Pittsburgh, Rutgers, Tennessee, UCLA, USC, Vanderbilt. He took an official visit to South Bend on October 31 of that year and formally enrolled early on June 30, 2009. He was one of three players to enroll early at Notre Dame at the time, alongside E.J. Banks and Zeke Motta. Additionally, he competed in the 2009 All-American Bowl.

Stockton saw limited action during his four years on the team at Notre Dame. He played in only six games throughout his college career, all of which were during his sophomore year, though he did not start any of them. The lone tackle he recorded at Notre Dame was a four-yard sack on October 2, 2010, against Boston College. Stockton did not see playing time during his true freshman, junior or senior seasons. He played in 11 games as a grad student in 2013, recording three tackles.

== Coaching career ==
Stockton took his first coaching position when he was hired as a graduate assistant at UConn in 2014, working under new head coach Bob Diaco, who had been his defensive coordinator at Notre Dame. He remained at UConn for two seasons. Stockton moved to Western Illinois in 2016 as the Leathernecks' defensive line coach and run game coordinator. After two seasons in those positions, he was promoted to defensive coordinator and outside linebackers coach before the 2018 season. He was hired by Mike Neu at Ball State as the Cardinals' defensive coordinator and inside linebackers coach, a position he has held since 2019.

In December 2020, Stockton was revealed to be one of 56 nominees for the Broyles Award, awarded annually to the top assistant coach in college football. He was nominated for a second time in November 2021, this time alongside 57 other assistants. Stockton was the second-youngest FBS defensive coordinator at the time of each of his nominations. After Randy Edsall retired as UConn head coach in September 2021, Stockton was mentioned by some as a potential replacement, though Jim L. Mora was ultimately selected.

In January 2026, Stockton was hired as the safeties coach at the University of Michigan by Kyle Whittingham.

== Personal life ==
Stockton is the son of Naomi and Lyndon Stockton. He graduated from the Mendoza College of Business at the University of Notre Dame with a Bachelor of Business Administration in marketing in 2013, and earned a Master of Business Administration in corporate finance from Notre Dame the following year.
