= Cam Camper =

American football player (born 2001)

Cameron Camper
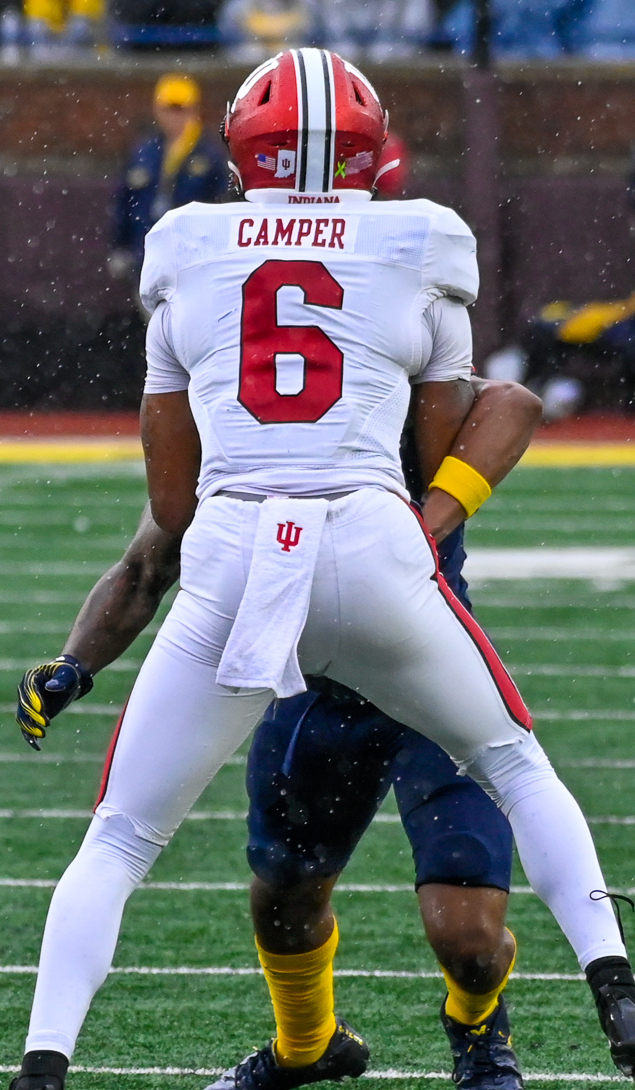
- Camper in 2023

Profile
- Position: Wide receiver

Personal information
- Born: August 21, 2001 (age 25); Willingboro, New Jersey, U.S.
- Listed height: 6 ft 3 in (1.91 m)
- Listed weight: 198 lb (90 kg)

Career information
- High school: Lancaster (Lancaster, Texas)
- College: Sam Houston (2019); Trinity Valley CC (2020–2021); Indiana (2022–2023); Boise State (2024)
- NFL draft: 2025: undrafted

Career history
- Jacksonville Jaguars (2025)*; Orlando Storm (2026); New York Jets (2026)*
- * Offseason or practice squad member only

Awards and highlights
- All-SWJCFC First Team (2020); All-SWJCFC First Team (2021); Earl Campbell Tyler Rose Weekly Award Honorable Mention (2022); Phil Steele All-Big Ten Second Team (2023); FBS Comeback Player of the Year Preseason Watch List (2023); All-MW Honorable Mention (2024); College Sports Network All-MW Third Team (2024); SB Nation MWCConnection All-MW Second Team (2024); Phil Steele All-MW Second Team (2024)

Cameron Elijah Camper (born August 21, 2001) is an American professional football wide receiver. He played college football for the Sam Houston Bearkats, Trinity Valley Cardinals, Indiana Hoosiers, and Boise State Broncos.

== Early life ==
Camper was born in Willingboro, New Jersey. His mother, Reeshia (Green)Newman, served in the United States Army as a MEDIC and lab technician. Cam was a multi-sport athlete from young, excelling in football, basketball and track. Camper graduated from Lancaster High School with a 3.5 GPA, before attending Sam Houston State University, playing for the football team as a preferred walk-on.

== College career ==
Camper left Sam Houston after the 2019 college football season to play for Trinity Valley Community College as a wide receiver. He was selected to the All-Southwest Junior College Football Conference team after both the 2020 and 2021 collegiate football seasons. He caught 50 receptions for four touchdowns and 858 yards through two seasons, but did not play fully for both seasons after sustaining injuries.

After spending two seasons at Trinity Valley Community College, and completing an Associate degree, Camper received offers from Missouri State, Alabama State, and New Mexico in 2021, eventually committing to the latter university. After committing to New Mexico on July 7, Camper also received offers from UCF, Eastern Kentucky, Hawaii, Indiana, Texas State, Liberty, and Toledo. He then visited Indiana on December 3, before decommitting from New Mexico on December 7 and committing to Indiana a week later. Camper made his debut against Illinois on September 2, 2022, receiving 11 receptions for 156 yards. He sustained an anterior cruciate ligament injury during a game against Rutgers on October 22, 2022, rendering him out for the rest of the 2022 Indiana Hoosiers season. Before the injury, however, he led Indiana receivers in terms of receptions and yardage, with 46 receptions and 569 yards. Camper was named as IU Offensive Player of the Year in 2022. As a result, he was put on the watchlist of the Earl Campbell Tyler Rose Award, where he received Honorable Mention.

In 2023, Camper started for Indiana for a Week 1 game against Ohio State after recovering from his injury. However, he sustained an injury to his right knee against Indiana State the following week on September 8. Despite this, he practiced the week after his injury, and started in a game against Louisville on September 16 that resulted in a 21–14 loss. In a 29–27 win against Akron in four overtimes, Camper scored a touchdown and had 103 receiving yards after catching four passes. Camper also caught three receptions for 29 yards in a 52–7 loss to Michigan. In November, Camper underwent a knee surgery that was related to his previous ACL injury, causing him to miss the rest of the 2023 season.

On December 7, 2023, Camper entered the transfer portal. He completed his bachelor's degree and graduated December 10, 2023 before committing to Boise State on January 7, 2024.

== Professional career ==
Pre-draft measurables
Height	Weight	Arm length	Hand span	Wingspan	40-yard dash	10-yard split	20-yard split	20-yard shuttle	Three-cone drill	Vertical jump	Broad jump
6 ft 2 7/8 in (1.90 m)	198 lb (90 kg)	32 3/4 in (0.83 m)	9 1/8 in (0.23 m)	6 ft 7 1/4 in (2.01 m)	4.52 s	1.51 s	2.60 s	4.26 s	7.12 s	33.0 in (0.84 m)	10 ft 3 in (3.12 m)
All values from Pro Day

=== Jacksonville Jaguars ===
Camper signed with the Jacksonville Jaguars as an undrafted free agent on April 27, 2025. He was waived on August 26 as part of final roster cuts.

=== Orlando Storm ===
On January 15, 2026, Camper was selected by the Orlando Storm in the 2026 UFL Draft.

=== New York Jets ===
On July 31, 2026, Camper signed with the New York Jets. Camper was waived by the Jets as a part of final roster cuts on August 30; he was re-signed to the team's practice squad the following day. Camper was released by the Jets on September 2.
