= Latrell Caples =

American football player (born 2002)

Profile
- Position: Wide receiver
- Class: Sixth Year

Personal information
- Born: April 20, 2002 (age 24)
- Listed height: 5 ft 11 in (1.80 m)
- Listed weight: 192 lb (87 kg)

Career information
- High school: Lancaster (Lancaster, Texas)
- College: Boise State (2020–2025)
- Stats at ESPN

Latrell Caples (born April 20, 2002) is an American college football wide receiver for the Boise State Broncos.

== Early life ==
Caples attended high school at Lancaster located in Lancaster, Texas. During his sophomore and junior seasons he combined to haul in 58 receptions for 995 yards and seven touchdowns. Coming out of high school, Caples was rated as a three star recruit, and the 123rd overall wide receiver, where he committed to play college football for the Boise State Broncos over offers from other schools such as Missouri, Nebraska, Colorado, Washington State, Utah, and Ole Miss.

== College career ==
In his first season in 2020 he used the season to redshirt. During the 2021 season, Caples played in six games, hauling in four passes for 56 yards. During the 2022 season, he totaled 51 receptions for 549 yards and four touchdowns. Heading into the 2023 season, Caples tore his Achilles causing him to miss the entirety of the 2023 season. In week four of the 2024 season, Caples caught just one pass for ten yards before suffering an injury, causing him to miss the team's next game. In week ten, he had six receptions for a career-high 90 yards and three touchdowns in a victory over San Diego State. Caples finished the 2024 season with 38 receptions for 473 yards and five touchdowns, as he helped the Broncos to their first CFP berth.

== Professional career ==
Pre-draft measurables
Height	Weight	Arm length	Hand span	Wingspan	40-yard dash	10-yard split	20-yard split	20-yard shuttle	Three-cone drill	Vertical jump	Broad jump	Bench press
5 ft 10 3/4 in (1.80 m)	192 lb (87 kg)	32 1/4 in (0.82 m)	8 1/8 in (0.21 m)	6 ft 3 1/4 in (1.91 m)	4.70 s	1.60 s	2.70 s	4.60 s	7.34 s	30.5 in (0.77 m)	9 ft 6 in (2.90 m)	14 reps
All values from Pro Day
