= Matt Lauter =

American football player (born 2002)

No. 88 – New Orleans Saints
- Position: Tight end
- Roster status: Practice squad

Personal information
- Born: September 20, 2002 (age 24)
- Listed height: 6 ft 3 in (1.91 m)
- Listed weight: 246 lb (112 kg)

Career information
- High school: Torrey Pines (San Diego, California)
- College: Boise State (2021–2025)
- NFL draft: 2026: undrafted

Career history
- Las Vegas Raiders (2026)*; Tennessee Titans (2026)*; Minnesota Vikings (2026)*; New Orleans Saints (2026–present)*
- * Offseason or practice squad member only

Awards and highlights
- 2× First-team All-MW (2024, 2025)
- Stats at Pro Football Reference

Matthew Lauter (born September 20, 2002) is an American professional football tight end for the New Orleans Saints of the National Football League (NFL). He played college football for the Boise State Broncos.

== Early life ==
Lauter attended Torrey Pines High School in San Diego, California. As a junior he brought in 20 passes for 316 yards and three touchdowns, while also collecting 47 tackles, three forced fumbles, and an interception. Coming out of high school, Lauter committed to play college football for the Boise State Broncos.

== College career ==
Lauter was redshirted as a freshman in 2021. In 2022, Lauter appeared in all 14 games where he notched four receptions for 40 yards. In week 5 of the 2023 season, he tallied three receptions for 76 yards versus Memphis. Lauter finished the 2023 season with nine receptions for 157 yards and three touchdowns. In week 3 of the 2024 season, he hauled in seven receptions for 91 yards and a touchdown in a win over Portland State. In week 5, Lauter recorded four catches for 96 yards and two touchdowns in a win over Washington State. During the 2024 season, he notched 47 receptions for 619 yards and seven touchdowns.

== Professional career ==
Pre-draft measurables
Height	Weight	Arm length	Hand span	Wingspan	40-yard dash	10-yard split	20-yard split	20-yard shuttle	Three-cone drill	Vertical jump	Broad jump	Bench press
6 ft 3 in (1.91 m)	246 lb (112 kg)	31 3/8 in (0.80 m)	9 in (0.23 m)	6 ft 5 3/8 in (1.97 m)	4.68 s	1.68 s	2.77 s	4.40 s	7.02 s	30.5 in (0.77 m)	9 ft 6 in (2.90 m)	21 reps
All values from Pro Day

=== Las Vegas Raiders ===
Lauter signed with the Las Vegas Raiders as an undrafted free agent on April 30, 2026. However, two days later, Lauter was waived by the Raiders.

=== Tennessee Titans ===
On August 16, 2026, Lauter signed with the Tennessee Titans. He was waived by the Titans on August 21.

=== Minnesota Vikings ===
Lauter was signed by the Minnesota Vikings on August 24, 2026. On August 30, he was waived by the Vikings as a part of the final roster cuts.

=== New Orleans Saints ===
On November 10, 2026, Lauter signed with the New Orleans Saints practice squad.
