= Maddux Madsen =

American football player (born 2003)

No. 4 – Boise State Broncos
- Position: Quarterback
- Class: Redshirt Senior

Personal information
- Born: August 1, 2003 (age 23); American Fork, Utah, U.S.
- Listed height: 5 ft 10 in (1.78 m)
- Listed weight: 207 lb (94 kg)

Career information
- High school: American Fork
- College: Boise State (2022–present)
- Stats at ESPN

Maddux Jeter Madsen (born August 1, 2003) is an American college football quarterback for the Boise State Broncos.

== Early life ==
Madsen was born to Jessica and Eric Madsen on August 1, 2003, and was named for pitcher Greg Maddux and shortstop Derek Jeter. His five siblings are also named after baseball stars. Madsen attended American Fork High School in American Fork, Utah. He was rated as a three-star recruit and committed to play college football for the Boise State Broncos over New Mexico.

== College career ==
As a freshman in 2022, Madsen played in just one game, against the Nevada Wolf Pack in a 41–3 win, completing three of his four pass attempts for 43 yards. In week 11 of the 2023 season, he made his first career start where he threw for 202 yards and two touchdowns in a win over New Mexico. During the 2023 season, Madsen appeared in nine games and completed 61% of his passes for 1,191 yards and nine touchdowns against three interceptions, while also adding 120 yards and two touchdowns on the ground. Ahead of the 2024 season, he was named the starting quarterback for the Broncos, beating out former 5-star recruit Malachi Nelson. He led Boise State to a 12–2 record, with their lone regular season loss being against then-#1 seed Oregon Ducks, 37–34. He also ended up winning the Mountain West Conference championship game against the UNLV Rebels, 21–7, and making the College Football Playoff as the #3 seed. They lost to #6 seed Penn State, 31–14.

=== Statistics ===
Season	Team	Games			Passing								Rushing			
Season	Team	GP	GS	Record	Cmp	Att	Pct	Yds	Avg	TD	Int	Rate	Att	Yds	Avg	TD
2022	Boise State	1	0	—	3	4	75.0	43	10.8	0	0	165.3	1	1	1.0	0
2023	Boise State	9	1	1–0	81	132	61.4	1,191	9.0	9	3	155.1	33	120	3.6	2
2024	Boise State	14	14	12–2	247	396	62.4	3,018	7.6	23	6	142.5	57	221	3.9	5
2025	Boise State	11	11	7–4	176	302	58.3	2,334	7.7	18	9	136.9	57	81	1.4	4
2026	Boise State	4	4	3–1	70	111	63.1	814	7.3	9	0	151.4	17	63	3.7	1
Career		39	30	23–7	577	945	61.1	7,400	7.8	59	18	143.6	165	486	2.9	12
