= 2025 San Jose State Spartans football team =

American college football season

2025 San Jose State Spartans football
- Conference: Mountain West Conference
- Record: 3–9 (2–6 MW)
- Head coach: Ken Niumatalolo (2nd season)
- Offensive coordinator: Craig Stutzmann (2nd season)
- Offensive scheme: Spread-N-Shred
- Defensive coordinator: Derrick Odum (9th season; games 1–10); Bojay Filimoeatu (interim; games 11–12)
- Base defense: 3–4
- Home stadium: CEFCU Stadium

Uniform
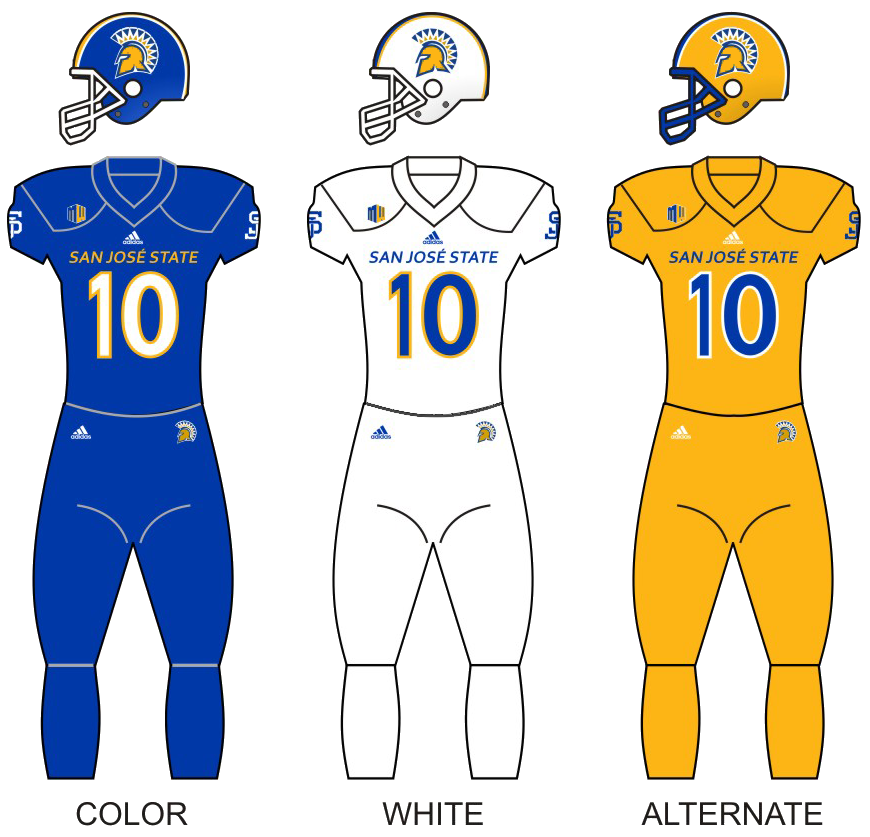

2025 Mountain West Conference football standings
	Conf.			Overall
Team	W		L	W		L
Boise State y$	6	–	2	9	–	5
UNLV y	6	–	2	10	–	4
San Diego State	6	–	2	9	–	4
New Mexico	6	–	2	9	–	4
Fresno State	5	–	3	9	–	4
Hawaii	5	–	3	9	–	4
Utah State	4	–	4	6	–	7
Air Force	3	–	5	4	–	8
Nevada	2	–	6	3	–	9
Wyoming	2	–	6	4	–	8
San Jose State	2	–	6	3	–	9
Colorado State	1	–	7	2	–	10
Championship: Boise State 38, UNLV 21
$ – Conference champion; y – Championship game participant; Rankings from CFP Rankings

The 2025 San Jose State Spartans football team represented San Jose State University in the 2025 NCAA Division I FBS football season. The Spartans head coach was Ken Niumatalolo in his 2nd year, with Craig Stutzmann at offensive coordinator and Derrick Odum at defensive coordinator. They played home games at CEFCU Stadium in San Jose, California.

== Offseason ==
=== Transfers ===
==== Outgoing ====
Player	Position	Destination
Michael Dansby	CB	Arizona
Emmett Brown	QB	Coastal Carolina
Kayden Collins	RB	Davenport
Alexander Cobbs	LB	Delaware State
Zack Homan	RB	Idaho State
TreyShun Hurry	WR	Louisville
Jacob Stewart	TE	Louisville
Sawyer Deerman	WR	Murray State
Malik Williams	OT	New Mexico State
Dylan Hampsten	EDGE	Sacramento State
Robert Rahimi	S	SMU
Macloud Crowton	QB	Southwest Minnesota State
DJ Harvey	CB	USC
Paolo Burak	RB	Unknown
Kade Millard	LB	Unknown
Akio Martinson	DL	Unknown
Alonzo Contreras	QB	Unknown
Will Leys	IOL	Unknown

==== Incoming ====
Player	Position	Previous school
Malachi Riley	WR	Arizona
Ryan Boultwood	TE	Boston College
Mason Starling	WR	California
Blake Tabaracci	LB	New Mexico
Cayden Woolwine	LB	Northern Arizona
Leland Smith	WR	Purdue
Danny Scudero	WR	Sacramento State
AJ Campos	LS	Sacramento State
Robert McDaniel	QB	UCLA
Maliki Crawford	CB	USC
Denis Lynch	K	USC
Vili Taufatofua	DL	Utah
Caleb Presley	CB	Washington

== Preseason ==
=== Mountain West media poll ===
The Mountain West's preseason prediction poll was released on July 16, 2025.

Mountain West media poll
Predicted finish	Team	Votes (1st place)
1	Boise State	464 (35)
2	UNLV	415 (4)
3	San Jose State	359
4	Colorado State	326
5	Fresno State	301
6	Air Force	280
7	Hawaii	213
8	San Diego State	202
9	Utah State	165
10	Wyoming	150
11	New Mexico	84
12	Nevada	83

== Schedule ==
Date	Time	Opponent	Site	TV	Result	Attendance
August 29	7:30 p.m.	Central Michigan*	CEFCU Stadium; San Jose, CA	FS1	L 14–16	14,877
September 6	9:00 a.m.	at No. 7 Texas*	Darrell K Royal–Texas Memorial Stadium; Austin, TX	ABC	L 7–38	100,841
September 20	2:00 p.m.	No. 8 (FCS) Idaho*	CEFCU Stadium; San Jose, CA	NBCSBA	W 31–28	13,155
September 27	4:30 p.m.	at Stanford*	Stanford Stadium; Stanford, CA (Bill Walsh Legacy Game)	ACCN	L 29–30	26,357
October 3	7:00 p.m.	New Mexico	CEFCU Stadium; San Jose, CA	FS1	W 35–28	12,109
October 11	4:00 p.m.	at Wyoming	War Memorial Stadium; Laramie, WY	CBSSN	L 28–35	20,970
October 17	6:00 p.m.	at Utah State	Maverik Stadium; Logan, UT	CBSSN	L 25–30	22,710
November 1	7:30 p.m.	Hawaii	CEFCU Stadium; San Jose, CA (Dick Tomey Legacy Game)	CBSSN	W 45–38	16,012
November 8	3:00 p.m.	Air Force	CEFCU Stadium; San Jose, CA	FS1	L 16–26	13,637
November 15	12:30 p.m.	at Nevada	Mackay Stadium; Reno, NV	CBSSN	L 10–55	14,491
November 22	7:30 p.m.	at San Diego State	Snapdragon Stadium; San Diego, CA	FS1	L 3–25	22,595
November 29	7:30 p.m.	Fresno State	CEFCU Stadium; San Jose, CA (Battle for the Valley)	FS1	L 14–41	14,194
*Non-conference game; Rankings from Coaches' Poll released prior to the game

== Game summaries ==
=== vs Central Michigan ===
Central Michigan Chippewas (0–0) at San Jose State Spartans (0–0) – Game summary

Quarter	1	2	3	4	Total
Chippewas	10	3	0	3	16
Spartans	0	7	7	0	14

at CEFCU Stadium • San Jose, California

- Date: August 29
- Game time: 7:30 PM PDT
- Game attendance: 14,877
- Referee: Cal McNeill
- TV announcers (FS1): Trent Rush (play-by-play) and Will Blackmon (analyst)

Game information

First quarter

- CMU – Trey Cornist 29-yard run (Cade Graham kick), 3:14. Chippewas 7–0. Drive: 8 plays, 80 yards, 4:28.
- CMU – Cade Graham 34-yard field goal, 0:10. Chippewas 10–0. Drive: 4 plays, -2 yards, 1:56.

Second quarter

- CMU – Cade Graham 28-yard field goal, 8:26. Chippewas 13–0. Drive: 7 plays, 31 yards, 3:37.
- SJSU – Leland Smith 11-yard pass from Walker Eget (Denis Lynch kick), 4:20. Chippewas 13–7. Drive: 8 plays, 74 yards, 3:58.

Third quarter

- SJSU – Danny Scudero 45-yard pass from Walker Eget (Denis Lynch kick), 12:01. Spartans 14–13. Drive: 6 plays, 75 yards, 2:59.

Fourth quarter

- CMU – Cade Graham 28-yard field goal, 4:13. Chippewas 16–14. Drive: 14 plays, 70 yards, 7:16.

Statistics	CMU	SJSU
First downs	20	19
Plays–yards	64–351	69–383
Rushes–yards	51–236	24–75
Passing yards	115	308
Passing: Comp–Att–Int	8–13–0	24–45–2
Turnovers	0	3
Time of possession	33:45	26:15

Team	Category	Player	Statistics
Central Michigan	Passing	Angel H. Flores	3/3, 59 yards
Central Michigan	Rushing	Nahree Biggins	18 carries, 102 yards
Central Michigan	Receiving	Tommy McIntosh	2 receptions, 61 yards
San Jose State	Passing	Walker Eget	24/43, 308 yards, 2 TD, 2 INT
San Jose State	Rushing	Floyd Chalk IV	11 carries, 44 yards
San Jose State	Receiving	Daniel Scudero	9 receptions, 189 yards, TD

=== at No. 7 Texas ===
San Jose State Spartans (0–1) at No. 7 Texas Longhorns (0–1) – Game summary

Quarter	1	2	3	4	Total
Spartans	0	7	0	0	7
No. 7 Longhorns	14	14	10	0	38

at Darrell K Royal–Texas Memorial Stadium • Austin, TX

- Date: September 6, 2025
- Game time: 11:00 a.m. CDT
- Game weather: Cloudy • Temperature: 82 °F (28 °C)
- Game attendance: 100,841
- Referee: Daniel Gautreaux
- TV announcers (ABC): Joe Tessitore (play-by-play), Jesse Palmer (analyst) and Katie George (sideline reporter)

Game information

First quarter

- (2:52) TEX – Parker Livingstone 83-yard pass from Arch Manning, Mason Shipley kick (Drive: 3 plays, 90 yards, 1:18; Texas 7–0)
- (0:12) TEX – Parker Livingstone 3-yard pass from Arch Manning, Mason Shipley kick (Drive: 5 plays, 34 yards, 2:32; Texas 14–0)

Second quarter

- (14:45) TEX – Jack Endries 36-yard pass from Arch Manning, Mason Shipley kick (Drive: 1 play, 36 yards, 0:08; Texas 21–0)
- (12:56) TEX – Jack Endries 16-yard pass from Arch Manning, Mason Shipley kick (Drive: 2 plays, 1 yard, 0:25; Texas 28–0)
- (8:19) SJSU – Jabari Bates 4-yard run, Denis Lynch kick (Drive: 8 plays, 75 yards, 4:37; Texas 28–7)

Third quarter

- (10:50) TEX – Mason Shipley 47-yard field goal (Drive: 7 plays, 32 yards, 3:13; Texas 31–7)
- (0:43) TEX – Arch Manning 20-yard run, Mason Shipley kick (Drive: 6 plays, 63 yards, 3:30; Texas 38–7)

Fourth quarter

No scoring plays

Statistics	SJSU	TEX
First downs	16	18
Plays–yards	72–273	65–472
Rushes–yards	29–85	32–155
Passing yards	188	317
Passing: comp–att–int	21–43–1	21–33–1
Turnovers	4	2
Time of possession	29:45	30:15

Team	Category	Player	Statistics
San Jose State	Passing	Walker Eget	21/42, 188 yards, INT
San Jose State	Rushing	Jabari Bates	10 carries, 44 yards, TD
San Jose State	Receiving	Kyri Shoels	8 receptions, 73 yards
Texas	Passing	Arch Manning	19/30, 295 yards, 4 TD, INT
Texas	Rushing	CJ Baxter	13 carries, 64 yards
Texas	Receiving	Parker Livingstone	4 receptions, 128 yards, 2 TD

=== vs No. 8 (FCS) Idaho ===
No. 8 (FCS) Idaho Vandals (2–1) at San Jose State Spartans (0–2) – Game summary

Quarter	1	2	3	4	Total
No. 8 (FCS) Vandals	7	7	7	7	28
Spartans	0	14	7	10	31

at CEFCU Stadium • San Jose, CA

- Date: September 20, 2025
- Game time: 2:00 p.m. PDT
- Game weather: Sunny • Temperature: 83 °F (28 °C)
- Game attendance: 13,155
- Referee: Kenneth Ray
- TV announcers (NBCSBA): Larry Beil (play-by-play), David Fales (analyst) and Lindsey Pallares (sideline reporter)

Game information

First quarter

- IDHO - Joshua Wood 1-yard run (Owen Forsman kick), 7:03. Vandals 7-0. Drive: 11 plays, 54 yards, 6:06.

Second quarter

- IDHO - Art Williams 1-yard run (Owen Forsman kick), 7:12. Vandals 14-0. Drive: 15 plays, 85 yards, 8:50.
- SJSU - Jabari Bates 87-yard run (Denis Lynch kick), 6:53. Vandals 14-7. Drive: 1 play, 87 yards, 0:13.
- SJSU - Kyri Shoels 15-yard pass from Walker Eget (Denis Lynch kick), 1:55. Tied 14-14. Drive: 7 plays, 80 yards, 4:01.

Third quarter

- IDHO - Ryan Jezioro 15-yard pass from Joshua Wood (Owen Forsman kick), 5:11. Vandals 21-14. Drive: 15 plays, 74 yards, 9:46.
- SJSU - Floyd Chalk IV 7-yard run (Denis Lynch kick), 1:51. Tied 21-21. Drive: 8 plays, 75 yards, 3:20.

Fourth quarter

- IDHO - Noah West-Baranco 18-yard pass from Joshua Wood (Owen Forsman kick), 9:17. Vandals 28-21. Drive: 11 plays, 57 yards, 7:27.
- SJSU - Floyd Chalk IV 1-yard run (Denis Lynch kick), 5:21. Tied 28-28. Drive: 7 plays, 68 yards, 3:50.
- SJSU - Denis Lynch 48-yard field goal, 0:08. Spartans 31-28. Drive: 8 plays, 31 yards, 3:15.

Statistics	IDHO	SJSU
First downs	22	15
Plays–yards	75–384	47–420
Rushes–yards	43–152	26–198
Passing yards	232	222
Passing: Comp–Att–Int	18–32–0	13–21–0
Turnovers	1	1
Time of possession	39:01	20:59

Team	Category	Player	Statistics
Idaho	Passing	Joshua Wood	18/32, 232 yards, 2 TD
Idaho	Rushing	Art Williams	18 carries, 65 yards, TD
Idaho	Receiving	Emmerson Cortez-Menjivar	5 receptions, 84 yards
San Jose State	Passing	Walker Eget	13/21, 222 yards, TD
San Jose State	Rushing	Jabari Bates	11 carries, 131 yards, TD
San Jose State	Receiving	Danny Scudero	6 receptions, 130 yards

=== at Stanford (Bill Walsh Legacy Game) ===
San Jose State Spartans (1–2) at Stanford Cardinal (1–3) – Game summary

Quarter	1	2	3	4	Total
Spartans	10	10	0	9	29
Cardinal	7	7	0	16	30

at Stanford Stadium • Stanford, CA

- Date: September 27, 2025
- Game time: 4:30 p.m. PDT
- Game attendance: 26,357
- Referee: Christian Watson
- TV announcers (ACCN): Jorge Sedano (play-by-play), Rodney McLeod (analyst) and Victoria Arlen (sideline reporter)

Game information

First quarter

- STAN – Cole Tabb 8-yard run (Emmet Kenney kick), 7:42. Cardinal 7–0. Drive: 11 plays, 81 yards, 7:12.
- SJSU – Denis Lynch 41-yard field goal, 4:46. Cardinal 7–3. Drive: 7 plays, 61 yards, 2:52.
- SJSU – Danny Scudero 10-yard pass from Walker Eget (Denis Lynch kick), 0:55. Spartans 10–7. Drive: 5 plays, 24 yards, 2:37.

Second quarter

- SJSU – Denis Lynch 36-yard field goal, 7:59. Spartans 13–7. Drive: 5 plays, 52 yards, 2:27.
- STAN – Sam Roush 15-yard pass from Ben Gulbranson (Emmet Kenney kick), 4:06. Cardinal 14–13. Drive: 7 plays, 77 yards, 3:49.
- SJSU – Kyri Shoels 29-yard pass from Walker Eget (Denis Lynch kick), 1:59. Spartans 20–14. Drive: 4 plays, 75 yards, 2:07.

Third quarter

- No scoring plays.

Fourth quarter

- SJSU – Danny Scudero 5-yard pass from Walker Eget (pass failed), 14:15. Spartans 26–14. Drive: 8 plays, 61 yards, 3:43.
- STAN – Myles Libman 14-yard pass from Ben Gulbranson (Emmet Kenney kick), 12:19. Spartans 26–21. Drive: 5 plays, 75 yards, 1:56.
- SJSU – Denis Lynch 31-yard field goal, 7:51. Spartans 29–21. Drive: 10 plays, 62 yards, 4:28.
- STAN – Emmet Kenney 36-yard field goal, 5:54. Spartans 29–24. Drive: 5 plays, 54 yards, 1:57.
- STAN – Sedrick Irvin 1-yard run (pass failed), 0:19. Cardinal 30–29. Drive: 12 plays, 80 yards, 2:26.

Statistics	SJSU	STAN
First downs	27	23
Plays–yards	72–524	69–481
Rushes–yards	14–51	26–37
Passing yards	473	444
Passing: comp–att–int	36–58–0	29–43–0
Turnovers	1	1
Time of possession	30:53	29:07

Team	Category	Player	Statistics
San Jose State	Passing	Walker Eget	36/58, 473 yards, 3 TD
San Jose State	Rushing	Walker Eget	2 carries, 19 yards
San Jose State	Receiving	Kyri Shoels	10 receptions, 147 yards, TD
Stanford	Passing	Ben Gulbranson	29/43, 444 yards, 2 TD
Stanford	Rushing	Cole Tabb	12 carries, 48 yards, TD
Stanford	Receiving	CJ Williams	11 receptions, 130 yards

=== New Mexico ===
New Mexico Lobos (3–1) at San Jose State Spartans (1–3) – Game summary

Quarter	1	2	3	4	Total
Lobos	0	17	0	11	28
Spartans	7	14	14	0	35

at CEFCU Stadium • San Jose, CA

- Date: October 3, 2025
- Game time: 7:00 p.m. PDT
- Game weather: Sunny • Temperature: 64 °F (18 °C)
- Game attendance: 12,109
- Referee: Patrick Foy
- TV announcers (FS1): Trent Rush (play-by-play) and Mark Helfrich (analyst)

Game information

First quarter

- SJSU – Steve Chavez-Soto 4-yard run (Mathias Brown kick), 9:10. Spartans 7–0. Drive: 12 plays, 75 yards, 5:50.

Second quarter

- SJSU – Matthew Coleman 11-yard pass from Walker Eget (Mathias Brown kick), 14:22. Spartans 14–0. Drive: 9 plays, 67 yards, 4:54.
- UNM – Damon Bankston 4-yard run (Luke Drzewiecki kick), 9:30. Spartans 14–7. Drive: 10 plays, 75 yards, 4:52.
- SJSU – Danny Scudero 70-yard pass from Walker Eget (Mathias Brown kick), 6:15. Spartans 21–7. Drive: 6 plays, 92 yards, 3:03.
- UNM – Scottre Humphrey 1-yard run (Luke Drzewiecki kick), 3:29. Spartans 21–14. Drive: 6 plays, 78 yards, 2:41.
- UNM – Luke Drzewiecki 25-yard field goal, 0:00. Spartans 21–17. Drive: 11 plays, 72 yards, 1:52.

Third quarter

- SJSU – Steve Chavez-Soto 10-yard run (Mathias Brown kick), 10:27. Spartans 28–17. Drive: 5 plays, 70 yards, 2:43.
- SJSU – Leland Smith 8-yard pass from Walker Eget (Mathias Brown kick), 2:42. Spartans 35–17. Drive: 11 plays, 86 yards, 6:13.

Fourth quarter

- UNM – Jack Layne 3-yard run (Jack Layne–Shawn Miller pass), 11:02. Spartans 35–25. Drive: 9 plays, 72 yards, 3:00.
- UNM – Luke Drzewiecki 31-yard field goal, 3:41. Spartans 35–28. Drive: 12 plays, 80 yards, 2:57.

Statistics	UNM	SJSU
First downs	29	24
Plays–yards	67–420	64–491
Rushes–yards	27–76	34–157
Passing yards	344	334
Passing: Comp–Att–Int	28–40–3	26–30–0
Turnovers	3	0
Time of possession	26:33	33:27

Team	Category	Player	Statistics
New Mexico	Passing	Jack Layne	28/40, 344 yards, 3 INT
New Mexico	Rushing	Damon Bankston	9 carries, 51 yards, TD
New Mexico	Receiving	Keagan Johnson	11 receptions, 145 yards
San Jose State	Passing	Walker Eget	26/30, 334 yards, 3 TD
San Jose State	Rushing	Steve Chavez-Soto	14 carries, 71 yards, 2 TD
San Jose State	Receiving	Danny Scudero	7 receptions, 151 yards, TD

=== at Wyoming ===
San Jose State Spartans (2–3) at Wyoming Cowboys (2–3) – Game summary

Quarter	1	2	3	4	Total
Spartans	14	14	0	0	28
Cowboys	7	7	0	21	35

at War Memorial Stadium • Laramie, WY

- Date: October 11, 2025
- Game time: 5:00 p.m. MDT
- Game weather: Cloudy • Temperature: 56 °F (13 °C) • Wind: SW 10 mph
- Game attendance: 20,970
- Referee: Gray Reed
- TV announcers (CBSSN): Jordan Kent (play-by-play) and Logan Ryan (analyst)

Game information

First quarter

- (12:39) SJSU – Danny Scudero 43-yard pass from Walker Eget, Mathias Brown kick (Drive: 6 plays, 75 yards, 2:21; SJSU 7–0)
- (8:52) WYO – Deion DeBlanc 73-yard punt return, Erik Sandvik kick (Tied 7–7)
- (8:05) SJSU – Danny Scudero 72-yard pass from Walker Eget, Mathias Brown kick (Drive: 2 plays, 75 yards, 0:47; SJSU 14–7)

Second quarter

- (14:10) SJSU – Danny Scudero 7-yard pass from Walker Eget, Mathias Brown kick (Drive: 12 plays, 80 yards, 7:11; SJSU 21–7)
- (10:39) WYO – Michael Fitzgerald 35-yard pass from Kaden Anderson, Erik Sandvik kick (Drive: 7 plays, 75 yards, 3:31; SJSU 21–14)
- (10:19) SJSU – Danny Scudero 2-yard pass from Walker Eget, Mathias Brown kick (Drive: 1 play, 2yards, 0:04; SJSU 28–14)

Third quarter

- No scoring plays.

Fourth quarter

- (9:59) WYO – Brayden Johnson 65-yard interception, Erik Sandvik kick (SJSU 28–21)
- (2:44) WYO – Charlie Coenen 45-yard pass from Kaden Anderson, Erik Sandvik kick (Drive: 6 plays, 85 yards, 1:58; Tied 28–28)
- (0:40) WYO – Terron Kellman 28-yard run, Erik Sandvik kick (Drive: 4 plays, 80 yards, 0:33; Wyoming 35–28)

Statistics	SJSU	WYO
First downs	21	20
Plays–yards	84–383	65–413
Rushes–yards	28–43	25–109
Passing yards	340	304
Passing: Comp–Att–Int	31–56–1	23–40–2
Turnovers	2	3
Time of possession	34:54	25:06

Team	Category	Player	Statistics
San Jose State	Passing	Walker Eget	23/37, 295 yards, 4 TD
San Jose State	Rushing	Lamar Radcliffe	7 carries, 29 yards
San Jose State	Receiving	Danny Scudero	10 receptions, 180 yards, 4 TD
Wyoming	Passing	Kaden Anderson	23/39, 304 yards, 2 TD, 2 INT
Wyoming	Rushing	Samuel Harris	9 carries, 47 yards
Wyoming	Receiving	Samuel Harris	2 receptions, 58 yards

=== at Utah State ===
San Jose State Spartans (2–4) at Utah State Aggies (3–3) – Game summary

Quarter	1	2	3	4	Total
Spartans	3	6	10	6	25
Aggies	7	3	14	6	30

at Maverik Stadium • Logan, UT

- Date: October 17, 2025
- Game time: 7:00 p.m. MDT
- Game attendance: 22,710
- Referee: Cal McNeill
- TV announcers (CBSSN): Chris Lewis (play-by-play) and Kyle Long (analyst)

Game information

First quarter

- SJSU – Denis Lynch 37-yard field goal, 10:28. Spartans 3–0. Drive: 12 plays, 56 yards, 4:35.
- USU – Braden Pegan 2-yard run (Tanner Rinker kick), 4:00. Aggies 7–3. Drive: 14 plays, 75 yards, 6:27.

Second quarter

- SJSU – Lamar Radcliffe 15-yard pass from Walker Eget (Mathia Brown kick failed), 1:07. Spartans 9–7. Drive: 7 plays, 89 yards, 2:28.
- USU – Tanner Rinker 31-yard field goal, 0:03. Aggies 10–9. Drive: 9 plays, 62 yards, 0:56.

Third quarter

- USU – Anthony Garcia 74-yard pass from Bryson Barnes (Tanner Rinker kick), 13:55. Aggies 17–9. Drive: 3 plays, 75 yards, 1:17.
- SJSU – Steve Chavez-Soto 65-yard run (Mathias Brown kick), 12:32. Aggies 17–16. Drive: 3 plays, 75 yards, 1:21.
- USU – Bryson Barnes 2-yard run (Tanner Rinker kick), 8:20. Aggies 24–16. Drive: 10 plays, 75 yards, 4:06.
- SJSU – Denis Lynch 35-yard field goal, 1:10. Aggies 24–19. Drive: 14 plays, 58 yards, 7:07.

Fourth quarter

- SJSU – Leland Smith 45-yard pass from Walker Eget (pass failed), 11:56. Spartans 25–24. Drive: 5 plays, 60 yards, 0:51.
- USU – Tanner Rinker 45-yard field goal, 6:13. Aggies 27–25. Drive: 14 plays, 48 yards, 5:39.
- USU – Tanner Rinker 44-yard field goal, 1:58. Aggies 30–25. Drive: 6 plays, 21 yards, 1:48.

Statistics	SJSU	USU
First downs	23	19
Plays–yards	77–534	70–461
Rushes–yards	27–194	38–130
Passing yards	340	331
Passing: Comp–Att–Int	27–50–0	23–32–0
Turnovers	1	0
Time of possession	30:13	29:47

Team	Category	Player	Statistics
San Jose State	Passing	Walker Eget	27/49, 340 yards, 2 TD
San Jose State	Rushing	Steve Chavez-Soto	11 carries, 102 yards, TD
San Jose State	Receiving	Leland Smith	4 receptions, 116 yards, TD
Utah State	Passing	Bryson Barnes	22/31, 326 yards, TD
Utah State	Rushing	Bryson Barnes	16 carries, 54 yards, TD
Utah State	Receiving	Anthony Garcia	3 receptions, 121 yards, TD

=== vs Hawaii (Dick Tomey Legacy Game) ===
Hawaii Rainbow Warriors (6–2) at San Jose State Spartans (2–5) – Game summary

Quarter	1	2	3	4	Total
Rainbow Warriors	7	7	14	10	38
Spartans	7	24	7	7	45

at CEFCU Stadium • San Jose, CA

- Date: November 1, 2025
- Game time: 7:30 p.m. PDT
- Game weather: Sunny • Temperature: 63 °F (17 °C) • Wind: NW 2 mph
- Game attendance: 16,012
- Referee: Kenneth Ray
- TV announcers (CBSSN): Alex Del Barrio (play-by-play) and Randy Cross (analyst)

Game information

First quarter

- (6:17) HAW – Cam Barfield 1-yard run, Kansei Matsuzawa kick (Drive: 13 plays, 71 yards, 6:48; Hawaii 7–0)
- (0:51) SJSU – Steve Chavez-Soto 10-yard run, Denis Lynch kick (Drive: 2 plays, 47 yards, 0:32; Tied 7–7)

Second quarter

- (9:49) SJSU – Steve Chavez-Soto 20-yard run, Denis Lynch kick (Drive: 11 plays, 87 yards, 4:28; San Jose State 14–7)
- (5:40) SJSU – Lamar Radcliffe 2-yard run, Denis Lynch kick (Drive: 8 plays, 104 yards, 2:31; San Jose State 21–7)
- (4:07) HAW – Jackson Harris 68-yard pass from Micah Alejado, Kansei Matsuzawa kick (Drive: 2 plays, 66 yards, 0:49; San Jose State 21–14)
- (3:29) SJSU – Danny Scudero 50-yard pass from Walker Eget, Denis Lynch kick (Drive: 2 plays, 73 yards, 0:32; San Jose State 28–14)
- (0:27) SJSU – Mathias Brown 24-yard field goal (Drive: 8 plays, 57 yards, 1:34; San Jose State 31–14)

Third quarter

- (9:46) HAW – Landon Sims 6-yard pass from Micah Alejado, Kansei Matsuzawa kick (Drive: 9 plays, 70 yards, 5:07; San Jose State 31–21)
- (9:02) SJSU – Danny Scudero 62-yard pass from Walker Eget, Denis Lynch kick (Drive: 3 plays, 75 yards, 0:44; San Jose State 38–21)
- (0:04) HAW – Landon Sims 2-yard run, Kansei Matsuzawa kick (Drive: 4 plays, 59 yards, 1:53; San Jose State 38–28)

Fourth quarter

- (9:32) HAW – Jackson Harris 20-yard pass from Micah Alejado, Kansei Matsuzawa kick (Drive: 9 plays, 73 yards, 3:25; San Jose State 38–35)
- (5:37) SJSU – Steve Chavez-Soto 1-yard run, Denis Lynch kick (Drive: 7 plays, 75 yards, 3:55; San Jose State 45–35)
- (1:16) HAW – Kansei Matsuzawa 24-yard field goal (Drive: 13 plays, 69 yards, 4:21; San Jose State 45–38)

Statistics	HAW	SJSU
First downs	22	26
Plays–yards	72–496	68–630
Rushes–yards	25–95	28–172
Passing yards	401	458
Passing: Comp–Att–Int	32–47–0	20–40–0
Turnovers	1	0
Time of possession	33:10	26:50

Team	Category	Player	Statistics
Hawaii	Passing	Micah Alejado	31/46, 367 yards, 3 TD
Hawaii	Rushing	Landon Sims	13 carries, 57 yards, TD
Hawaii	Receiving	Jackson Harris	6 receptions, 134 yards, 2 TD
San Jose State	Passing	Walker Eget	20/40, 458 yards, 2 TD
San Jose State	Rushing	Lamar Radcliffe	10 carries, 97 yards, TD
San Jose State	Receiving	Danny Scudero	7 receptions, 215 yards, 2 TD

=== vs Air Force ===
Air Force Falcons (2–6) at San Jose State Spartans (3–5) – Game summary

Quarter	1	2	3	4	Total
Falcons	0	16	0	10	26
Spartans	3	0	3	10	16

at CEFCU Stadium • San Jose, California

- Date: November 8
- Game time: 4:00 p.m. MST / 3:00 p.m. PST
- Game weather: Sunny, 75 °F (24 °C)
- Game attendance: 13,637
- Referee: Christian Watson
- TV announcers (FS1): Eric Collins (play-by-play) and Spencer Tillman (analyst)

Game information
First quarter
- SJSU – Denis Lynch 31-yard field goal, 11:44. Spartans 3–0. Drive: 7 plays, 47 yards, 1:56.

Second quarter

- AFA – Liam Szarka 3-yard run (Reagan Tubbs kick), 13:45. Falcons 7–3. Drive: 15 plays, 81 yards, 8:02.
- AFA – Liam Szarka 1-yard run (Reagan Tubbs kick), 8:31. Falcons 14–3. Drive: 8 plays, 45 yards, 4:17.
- AFA – Payton Zdroik safety, 1:43. Falcons 16–3.

Third quarter

- SJSU – Mathias Brown 29-yard field goal, 10:34. Falcons 16–6. Drive: 10 plays, 69 yards, 4:26.

Fourth quarter

- SJSU – Steve Chavez–Soto (Denis Lynch kick), 14:20. Falcons 16–13. Drive: 11 plays, 88 yards, 4:23.
- AFA – Quin Smith 12-yard pass from Liam Szarka (Reagan Tubbs kick), 9:11. Falcons 23–13. Drive: 19 plays, 75 yards, 5:09.
- SJSU – Denis Lynch 34-yard field goal, 5:43. Falcons 23–16. Drive: 9 plays, 59 yards, 3:28.
- AFA – Reagan Tubbs 33-yard field goal, 0:31. Falcons 26–16. Drive: 11 plays, 60 yards, 5:12.

Statistics	AFA	SJSU
First downs	21	23
Plays–yards	73–302	60–435
Rushes–yards	63–261	17–94
Passing yards	41	341
Passing: Comp–Att–Int	5–10–0	28–43–2
Turnovers	0	3
Time of possession	36:26	23:34

Team	Category	Player	Statistics
Air Force	Passing	Liam Szarka	5/10, 41 yards, TD
Air Force	Rushing	Owen Allen	20 carries, 109 yards
Air Force	Receiving	Bruin Fleischmann	2 receptions, 29 yards
San Jose State	Passing	Walker Eget	27/42, 334 yards, 2 INT
San Jose State	Rushing	Steve Chavez-Soto	9 carries, 49 yards, TD
San Jose State	Receiving	Leland Smith	9 receptions, 144 yards

=== at Nevada ===
San Jose State Spartans (3–6) at Nevada Wolf Pack (1–8) – Game summary

Quarter	1	2	3	4	Total
Spartans	0	0	3	7	10
Wolf Pack	14	17	7	17	55

at Mackay Stadium • Reno, NV

- Date: November 15, 2025
- Game time: 12:30 p.m. PST
- Game weather: Sunny, 59°F, East wind at 5 mph
- Game attendance: 14,491
- Referee: Cal McNeill
- TV announcers (CBSSN): Fran Charles (play-by-play) and Taylor McHargue (analyst)

Game information

First quarter

- NEV – Nakian Jackson 66-yard interception return (Joe McFadden kick), 9:24. Wolf Pack 7–0.
- NEV – Chubba Purdy 7-yard pass from Carter Jones (Joe McFadden kick), 6:20. Wolf Pack 14–0. Drive: 5 plays, 30 yards, 2:59.

Second quarter

- NEV – Caleb Ramseur 30-yard pass from Carter Jones (Joe McFadden kick), 12:21. Wolf Pack 21–0. Drive: 13 plays, 78 yards, 7:52.
- NEV – Chubba Purdy 13-yard run (Joe McFadden kick), 10:49. Wolf Pack 28–0. Drive: 1 play, 13 yards, 0:06.
- NEV – Joe McFadden 50-yard field goal, 0:01. Wolf Pack 31–0. Drive: 3 plays, 22 yards, 0:17.

Third quarter

- SJSU – Mathias Brown 46-yard field goal, 8:12. Wolf Pack 31–3. Drive: 7 plays, 52 yards, 2:42.
- NEV – Caleb Ramseur 11-yard run (Joe McFadden kick), 2:53. Wolf Pack 38–3. Drive: 8 plays, 75 yards, 5:19.

Fourth quarter

- NEV – Dominic Kelly 5-yard run (Joe McFadden kick), 10:57. Wolf Pack 45–3. Drive: 6 plays, 65 yards, 3:11.
- NEV – Joe McFadden 26-yard field goal, 4:37. Wolf Pack 48–3. Drive: 8 plays, 42 yards, 5:29.
- SJSU – Tama Amisone 12-yard run (Denis Lynch kick), 1:23. Wolf Pack 48–10. Drive: 8 plays, 75 yards, 3:14.
- NEV – Ky Woods 99-yard kickoff return (Joe McFadden kick), 1:10. Wolf Pack 55–10.

Statistics	SJSU	NEV
First downs	14	23
Plays–yards	58–270	61–413
Rushes–yards	26–125	42–218
Passing yards	145	195
Passing: Comp–Att–Int	16–32–4	16–19–0
Turnovers	5	0
Time of possession	22:35	37:25

Team	Category	Player	Statistics
San Jose State	Passing	Walker Eget	11/23, 74 yards, 3 INT
San Jose State	Rushing	Steve Chavez-Soto	8 carries, 47 yards
San Jose State	Receiving	Kyri Shoels	3 receptions, 47 yards
Nevada	Passing	Carter Jones	16/19, 195 yards, 2 TD
Nevada	Rushing	Caleb Ramseur	20 carries, 128 yards, TD
Nevada	Receiving	Dakota Thomas	6 receptions, 85 yards

=== at San Diego State ===
San Jose State Spartans (3–7) at San Diego State Aztecs (8–2) – Game summary

Quarter	1	2	3	4	Total
Spartans	0	3	0	0	3
Aztecs	11	7	0	7	25

at Snapdragon Stadium • San Diego, CA

- Date: November 22, 2025
- Game time: 7:30 p.m. PST
- Game weather: Cloudy • Temperature: 59 °F (15 °C) • Wind: N at 2 miles per hour (3.2 km/h)
- Game attendance: 22,595
- Referee: Patrick Foy
- TV announcers (FS1): Dan Hellie (play-by-play) and Petros Papadakis (analyst)

Game information

First quarter

- (11:14) SDSU – Lucky Sutton 1-yard run, Brady Anderson pass from DJ Herman (Drive: 6 plays, 20 yards, 2:44; San Diego State 8–0)
- (0:08) SDSU – Gabriel Plascencia 35-yard field goal (Drive: 5 plays, 31 yards, 1:41; San Diego State 11–0)

Second quarter

- (10:03) SJSU – Mathias Brown 37-yard field goal (Drive: 12 plays, 57 yards, 5:00; San Diego State 11–3)
- (0:01) SDSU – Jayden Denegal 1-yard run, Gabriel Plascencia kick (Drive: 10 plays, 79 yards, 3:16; San Diego State 18–3)

Third quarter

- No scoring plays.

Fourth quarter

- (2:03) SDSU – Christian Washington 8-yard run, Gabriel Plascencia kick (Drive: 5 plays, 45 yards, 1:51; San Diego State 18–3)

Statistics	SJSU	SDSU
First downs	19	16
Plays–yards	74–268	60–248
Rushes–yards	36–133	44–167
Passing yards	135	81
Passing: Comp–Att–Int	20–38–2	8–16–0
Turnovers	2	0
Time of possession	32:38	27:22

Team	Category	Player	Statistics
San Jose State	Passing	Tama Amisone	15/27, 104 yards, INT
San Jose State	Rushing	Tama Amisone	13 carries, 75 yards
San Jose State	Receiving	Danny Scudero	12 receptions, 79 yards
San Diego State	Passing	Jayden Denegal	8/16, 81 yards
San Diego State	Rushing	Lucky Sutton	20 carries, 79 yards, TD
San Diego State	Receiving	Donovan Brown	2 receptions, 63 yards

=== vs Fresno State (Battle for the Valley) ===
Fresno State Bulldogs (7–4) at San Jose State Spartans (3–8) – Game summary

Quarter	1	2	3	4	Total
Bulldogs	3	18	3	17	41
Spartans	0	7	0	7	14

at CEFCU Stadium • San Jose, CA

- Date: November 29, 2025
- Game time: 7:30 p.m. PST
- Game weather: Clear • Temperature: 49 °F (9 °C) • Wind: N at 3 miles per hour (4.8 km/h)
- Game attendance: 14,194
- Referee: Cal McNeill
- TV announcers (FS1): Trent Rush (play-by-play) and Charles Arbuckle (analyst)

Game information

First quarter

- (6:16) FRES – Dylan Lynch 34-yard field goal (Drive: 7 plays, 19 yards, 3:47; Fresno State 3–0)

Second quarter

- (14:52) FRES – Dylan Lynch 41-yard field goal (Drive: 5 plays, 37 yards, 2:30; Fresno State 6–0)
- (11:44) FRES – Brandon Ramirez 2-yard run, Dylan Lynch kick (Drive: 5 plays, 37 yards, 2:30; Fresno State 13–0)
- (7:50) SJSU – Jordan Pollard 57-yard interception return, Dennis Lynch kick (Fresno State 13–7)
- (1:45) FRES – Josiah Freeman 37-yard pass from E. J. Warner, (Josiah Freeman run) (Drive: 9 plays, 38 yards, 4:16; Fresno State 21–0)

Third quarter

- (8:20) FRES – Dylan Lynch 41-yard field goal (Drive: 4 plays, 9 yards, 2:05; Fresno State 24–7)

Fourth quarter

- (10:59) SJSU – Viliami Teu 1-yard run, Dennis Lynch kick (Drive: 6 plays, 39 yards, 3:55; Fresno State 24–14)
- (6:57) FRES – Elijah Gilliam 2-yard run, Dylan Lynch kick (Drive: 7 plays, 75 yards, 4:02; Fresno State 31–14)
- (4:07) FRES – Dylan Lynch 33-yard field goal (Drive: 4 plays, 6 yards, 2:05; Fresno State 34–14)
- (1:52) FRES – Elijah Gilliam 34-yard run, Dylan Lynch kick (Drive: 4 plays, 41 yards, 2:09; Fresno State 41–14)

Statistics	FRES	SJSU
First downs	16	14
Plays–yards	73–397	60–227
Rushes–yards	53–259	26–113
Passing yards	138	114
Passing: Comp–Att–Int	15–20–1	11–34–5
Turnovers	3	5
Time of possession	39:07	20:53

Team	Category	Player	Statistics
Fresno State	Passing	E. J. Warner	15/20, 138 yards, TD, INT
Fresno State	Rushing	Elijah Gilliam	9 carries, 92 yards, 2 TD
Fresno State	Receiving	Josiah Freeman	6 receptions, 76 yards, TD
San Jose State	Passing	Xavier Ward	8/21, 94 yards, 3 INT
San Jose State	Rushing	Steve Chavez-Soto	9 carries, 50 yards
San Jose State	Receiving	Danny Scudero	4 receptions, 57 yards
