= 2025 Colorado State Rams football team =

American college football season

2025 Colorado State Rams football
- Conference: Mountain West Conference
- Record: 2–10 (1–7 MW)
- Head coach: Jay Norvell (4th season; first 7 games); Tyson Summers (interim; remainder of season)
- Offensive coordinator: Matt Mumme (4th season)
- Offensive scheme: West Coast
- Defensive coordinator: Tyson Summers (2nd season)
- Base defense: 3–3–5
- Home stadium: Canvas Stadium

2025 Mountain West Conference football standings
| | Conf. | | | Overall |
| Team | W | | L | W | | L |
|---|---|---|---|---|---|---|
| Boise State y$ | 6 | – | 2 | 9 | – | 5 |
| UNLV y | 6 | – | 2 | 10 | – | 4 |
| San Diego State | 6 | – | 2 | 9 | – | 4 |
| New Mexico | 6 | – | 2 | 9 | – | 4 |
| Fresno State | 5 | – | 3 | 9 | – | 4 |
| Hawaii | 5 | – | 3 | 9 | – | 4 |
| Utah State | 4 | – | 4 | 6 | – | 7 |
| Air Force | 3 | – | 5 | 4 | – | 8 |
| Nevada | 2 | – | 6 | 3 | – | 9 |
| Wyoming | 2 | – | 6 | 4 | – | 8 |
| San Jose State | 2 | – | 6 | 3 | – | 9 |
| Colorado State | 1 | – | 7 | 2 | – | 10 |
Championship: Boise State 38, UNLV 21
$ – Conference champion; y – Championship game participant; Rankings from CFP Rankings

The 2025 Colorado State Rams football team represented Colorado State University as a member of the Mountain West Conference (MW) during the 2025 NCAA Division I FBS football season. The Rams played their home games at Canvas Stadium located in Fort Collins, Colorado.

The 2025 season was the final season in the Mountain West Conference as Colorado State will move to the Pac-12 Conference in 2026.

The Rams were led by fourth-year head coach Jay Norvell for the first seven games of the season. Norvell was fired on October 19 following a 2–5 start to the season, finishing his tenure with the Rams with an overall record of 18–26. Defensive coordinator Tyson Summers was named the team's interim coach for the rest of the season.

== Offseason ==
=== Transfers ===
==== Outgoing ====
| Player | Position | Destination |
|---|---|---|
| Nate Weyand | TE | Austin Peay |
| Louis Brown IV | WR | Baylor |
| Buom Jock | WR | California |
| Caleb Goodie | WR | Cincinnati |
| Jamari Person | WR | Liberty |
| Vince Brown II | TE | Missouri |
| Damian Henderson | RB | Sacramento State |
| Jordan Williams | TE | Sacramento State |
| Niko Lopez | LB | Saddleback |
| Dylan Goffney | WR | SMU |
| Morgan Tribbett | LS | SMU |
| Nuer Gatkuoth | DE | Wake Forest |
| Gabe Kirschke | DL | Wake Forest |
| Chase Wilson | LB | West Virginia |
| Mukendi Wa-Kalonji | DL | Unknown |
| Poukesi Vakauta | DL | Unknown |

==== Incoming ====
| Player | Position | Previous school |
|---|---|---|
| Tahj Bullock | QB | Akron |
| Elijah Brown | CB | Arizona |
| JaQues Evans | DE | Baylor |
| Isaiah Hankins | K | Baylor |
| William Wortmann | IOL | Central Missouri |
| Tristan Holmbeck | IOL | Dartmouth |
| Petey Tucker | WR | Eastern Michigan |
| Rocky Beers | TE | FIU |
| Jake Jarmolowich | DB | Holy Cross |
| Jacob Ellis | LB | Iowa State |
| Walker Himebauch | LS | Kentucky |
| Dennious Jackson | DL | Kentucky |
| Lemondre Joe | DB | Missouri State |
| Moso'oipala Tuitele | EDGE | New Mexico |
| Gabe Jones | DL | New Mexico State |
| Tay Lanier | WR | Northern Arizona |
| Vann Schield | RB | Northern Arizona |
| Vann Schield | RB | Northern Colorado |
| Kojo Antwi | WR | Ohio State |
| Robert Edmonson Jr. | LB | Prairie View A&M |
| Paul Tangelo | EDGE | Saint Francis |
| Louis Brown IV | WR | San Diego State |
| Jahari Rogers | DB | SMU |
| Lloyd Avant | RB | Tulsa |
| CJ Blocker | CB | Utah |
| Carlos Anaya | TE | Wofford |

== Preseason ==
=== Mountain West media poll ===
The Mountain West's preseason prediction poll was released on July 16, 2025. Colorado State was predicted to finish fourth.

== Schedule ==
| Date | Time | Opponent | Site | TV | Result | Attendance |
|---|---|---|---|---|---|---|
| August 30 | 9:00 p.m. | at Washington* | Husky Stadium; Seattle, WA | BTN | L 21–38 | 67,778 |
| September 6 | 5:00 p.m. | Northern Colorado* | Canvas Stadium; Fort Collins, CO | Altitude | W 21–17 | 37,023 |
| September 20 | 7:30 p.m. | UTSA* | Canvas Stadium; Fort Collins, CO | FS1 | L 16–17 | 32,061 |
| September 27 | 5:30 p.m. | Washington State* | Canvas Stadium; Fort Collins, CO | CBSSN | L 3–20 | 32,087 |
| October 3 | 8:30 p.m. | at San Diego State | Snapdragon Stadium; San Diego, CA | CBSSN | L 24–45 | 29,019 |
| October 10 | 7:00 p.m. | Fresno State | Canvas Stadium; Fort Collins, CO | CBSSN | W 49–21 | 27,874 |
| October 18 | 5:00 p.m. | Hawaii^{†} | Canvas Stadium; Fort Collins, CO | Spectrum Sports | L 19–31 | 40,416 |
| October 25 | 5:30 p.m. | at Wyoming | War Memorial Stadium; Laramie, WY (Border War) | CBSSN | L 0–28 | 25,609 |
| November 8 | 7:30 p.m. | UNLV | Canvas Stadium; Fort Collins, CO | FS1 | L 10–42 | 27,970 |
| November 15 | 1:00 p.m. | at New Mexico | University Stadium; Albuquerque, NM | Altitude | L 17–20 | 27,526 |
| November 22 | 5:00 p.m. | at Boise State | Albertsons Stadium; Boise, ID | FS1 | L 21–49 | 32,819 |
| November 28 | 1:00 p.m. | Air Force | Canvas Stadium; Fort Collins, CO (rivalry) | FS1 | L 21–42 | 25,873 |
*Non-conference game; ^{†}Homecoming; All times are in Mountain time

== Game summaries ==
=== at Washington ===
Colorado State Rams (0–0) at Washington Huskies (0–0) – Game summary

| Quarter | 1 | 2 | 3 | 4 | Total |
|---|---|---|---|---|---|
| Rams | 7 | 7 | 7 | 0 | 21 |
| Huskies | 7 | 7 | 14 | 10 | 38 |

at Husky Stadium • Seattle, Washington

- Date: August 30
- Game time: 9:00 p.m. MDT
- Game weather: Cloudy • Temperature: 67 °F (19 °C) • Wind: N at 6 miles per hour (9.7 km/h)
- Game attendance: 67,778
- Referee: David Siegle
- TV announcers (BTN): Mark Followill (play-by-play), Lincoln Kennedy (analyst) and Alyssa Charlston (sideline)

Game information

First quarter

- WASH – Jonah Coleman 26-yard run (Grady Gross kick), 11:08. Huskies 7–0. Drive: 6 plays, 59 yards, 2:22.
- CSU – Tahj Bullock 2-yard run (Isaiah Hankins kick), 6:47. Tied 7–7. Drive: 9 plays, 75 yards, 4:11.

Second quarter

- WASH – Adam Mohammed 1-yard run (Grady Gross kick), 10:43. Huskies 14–7. Drive: 7 plays, 88 yards, 3:32.
- CSU – Jalen Dupree 15-yard run (Isaiah Hankins kick), 0:10. Tied 14–14. Drive: 9 plays, 66 yards, 1:32.

Third quarter

- WASH – Kade Eldridge 1-yard run (Grady Gross kick), 11:17. Huskies 21–14. Drive: 7 plays, 59 yards, 3:35.
- CSU – Jaxxon Warren 27-yard pass from Brayden Fowler-Nicolosi (Isaiah Hankins kick), 8:01. Tied 21–21. Drive: 7 plays, 65 yards, 3:16.
- WASH – Denzel Boston 12-yard pass from Demond Williams Jr. (Grady Gross kick), 3:01. Huskies 28–21. Drive: 9 plays, 69 yards, 4:51.

Fourth quarter

- WASH – Grady Gross 24-yard field goal, 12:11. Huskies 31–21. Drive: 11 plays, 56 yards, 4:30.
- WASH – Jonah Coleman 3-yard run (Grady Gross kick), 6:57. Huskies 38–21. Drive: 5 plays, 52 yards, 2:38.

| Statistics | CSU | WASH |
|---|---|---|
| First downs | 17 | 26 |
| Plays–yards | 60–265 | 74–513 |
| Rushes–yards | 27–85 | 50–287 |
| Passing yards | 180 | 226 |
| Passing: comp–att–int | 17–33–1 | 18–24–0 |
| Turnovers | 1 | 1 |
| Time of possession | 23:16 | 36:44 |

| Team | Category | Player | Statistics |
|---|---|---|---|
| Colorado State | Passing | Brayden Fowler-Nicolosi | 17/32, 180 yards, TD, INT |
| Colorado State | Rushing | Jalen Dupree | 15 carries, 92 yards, TD |
| Colorado State | Receiving | Jaxxon Warren | 6 receptions, 79 yards, TD |
| Washington | Passing | Demond Williams Jr. | 18/24, 226 yards, TD |
| Washington | Rushing | Jonah Coleman | 24 carries, 177 yards, 2 TD |
| Washington | Receiving | Denzel Boston | 5 receptions, 92 yards, TD |

=== Northern Colorado (FCS) ===
Northern Colorado Bears (FCS) (1–0) at Colorado State Rams (0–1) – Game summary

| Quarter | 1 | 2 | 3 | 4 | Total |
|---|---|---|---|---|---|
| Bears (FCS) | 7 | 3 | 7 | 0 | 17 |
| Rams | 0 | 0 | 14 | 7 | 21 |

at Canvas Stadium • Fort Collins, CO

- Date: September 6, 2025
- Game time: 5:00 p.m.
- Game attendance: 37,023
- Referee: Patrick Foy
- TV announcers (Altitude): Brian Roth (play-by-play) and Sed Bonner (analyst)

Game information

First quarter

- UNCO – Kia'i Keone 1-yard run (Jacob Willig kick), 6:37. Bears 7–0. Drive: 7 plays, 39 yards, 3:26.

Second quarter

- UNCO – Jacob Willig 23-yard field goal, 7:12. Bears 10–0. Drive: 4 plays, 6 yards, 1:47.

Third quarter

- CSU – Lloyd Avant 2-yard run (Isaiah Hankins kick), 13:23. Bears 10–7. Drive: 2 plays, 12 yards, 0:51.
- UNCO – Aliou-Rocco Traore 1-yard run (Jacob Willig kick), 7:14. Bears 17–7. Drive: 13 plays, 75 yards, 6:09.
- CSU – Lloyd Avant 6-yard run (Isaiah Hankins kick), 1:25. Bears 17–14. Drive: 11 plays, 75 yards, 5:49.

Fourth quarter

- CSU – Brayden Fowler-Nicolosi 13-yard run (Isaiah Hankins kick), 0:44. Rams 21–17. Drive: 13 plays, 77 yards, 3:05.

| Statistics | UNCO | CSU |
|---|---|---|
| First downs | 17 | 27 |
| Plays–yards | 62–223 | 72–371 |
| Rushes–yards | 34–63 | 46–230 |
| Passing yards | 160 | 141 |
| Passing: Comp–Att–Int | 17–28–1 | 14–26–1 |
| Turnovers | 2 | 5 |
| Time of possession | 29:23 | 30:37 |

| Team | Category | Player | Statistics |
|---|---|---|---|
| Northern Colorado | Passing | Eric Gibson Jr. | 17/28, 160 yards, INT |
| Northern Colorado | Rushing | Justin Guin | 11 carries, 38 yards |
| Northern Colorado | Receiving | Carver Cheeks | 5 receptions, 54 yards |
| Colorado State | Passing | Brayden Fowler-Nicolosi | 13/25, 132 yards, INT |
| Colorado State | Rushing | Lloyd Avant | 11 carries, 68 yards, 2 TD |
| Colorado State | Receiving | Armani Winfield | 4 receptions, 49 yards |

=== UTSA ===
UTSA Roadrunners (1–2) at Colorado State Rams (1–1) – Game summary

| Quarter | 1 | 2 | 3 | 4 | Total |
|---|---|---|---|---|---|
| Roadrunners | 0 | 10 | 0 | 7 | 17 |
| Rams | 0 | 3 | 0 | 13 | 16 |

at Canvas Stadium • Fort Collins, CO

- Date: September 20, 2025
- Game time: 7:30 p.m. MDT
- Game weather: Cloudy • Temperature: 68 °F (20 °C) • Wind: NW at 7 miles per hour (11 km/h)
- Game attendance: 32,061
- Referee: Cal McNeill
- TV announcers (FS1): Dan Hellie (play-by-play) and Petros Papadakis (analyst)

Game information
First quarter
- No scoring plays

Second quarter

- UTSA – Robert Henry Jr. 76-yard run (Michael Petro kick), 10:42. Roadrunners 7–0. Drive: 3 plays, 83 yards, 0:50.
- CSU – Isaiah Hankins 23-yard field goal, 7:04. Roadrunners 7–3. Drive: 7 plays, 69 yards, 3:38.
- UTSA – Michael Petro 40-yard field goal, 0:48. Roadrunners 10–3. Drive: 9 plays, 23 yards, 2:52.

Third quarter

- No scoring plays

Fourth quarter

- CSU – Tahj Bullock 10-yard run (Isaiah Hankins kick), 6:19. Tied 10–10. Drive: 9 plays, 67 yards, 5:24.
- UTSA – Robert Henry Jr. 74-yard pass from Owen McCown (Michael Petro kick), 4:49. Roadrunners 17–10. Drive: 3 plays, 75 yards, 1:30.
- CSU – Rocky Beers 4-yard pass from Jackson Brousseau (pass failed), 0:29. Roadrunners 17–16. Drive: 13 plays, 75 yards, 4:20.

| Statistics | UTSA | CSU |
|---|---|---|
| First downs | 13 | 20 |
| Plays–yards | 60–345 | 75–407 |
| Rushes–yards | 33–172 | 37–153 |
| Passing yards | 173 | 254 |
| Passing: Comp–Att–Int | 14–27–2 | 24–38–0 |
| Turnovers | 2 | 0 |
| Time of possession | 26:27 | 33:33 |

| Team | Category | Player | Statistics |
|---|---|---|---|
| UTSA | Passing | Owen McCown | 14/27, 173 yards, TD, 2 INT |
| UTSA | Rushing | Robert Henry Jr. | 21 carries, 144 yards, TD |
| UTSA | Receiving | Robert Henry Jr. | 2 receptions, 76 yards, TD |
| Colorado State | Passing | Brayden Fowler-Nicolosi | 14/25, 176 yards |
| Colorado State | Rushing | Lloyd Avant | 10 carries, 96 yards |
| Colorado State | Receiving | Armani Winfield | 6 receptions, 93 yards |

=== Washington State ===
Washington State Cougars (2–2) at Colorado State Rams (1–2) – Game summary

| Quarter | 1 | 2 | 3 | 4 | Total |
|---|---|---|---|---|---|
| Cougars | 10 | 10 | 0 | 0 | 20 |
| Rams | 3 | 0 | 0 | 0 | 3 |

at Canvas Stadium • Fort Collins, CO

- Date: September 27, 2025
- Game time: 5:30 p.m. MDT
- Game weather: Sunny • Temperature: 74 °F (23 °C) • Wind: SE at 5 miles per hour (8.0 km/h)
- Game attendance: 32,087
- Referee: Chris Wiggins
- TV announcers (CBSSN): Rich Waltz (play-by-play), Robert Turbin (analyst) and Tiffany Blackmon (sideline)

Game information

First quarter

- CSU - Isaiah Hankins 50-yard field goal, 11:32. Rams 3-0, Drive: 7 plays, 33 yards, 3:25.
- WSU – Jeremiah Noga 35-yard pass from Zevi Eckhaus (Jack Stevens kick), 8:43. Cougars 7-3, Drive: 5 plays, 82 yards, 2:45.
- WSU - Jack Stevens 37-yard field goal, 2:05. Cougars 10-3, Drive: 8 plays, 32 yards, 4:30.

Second quarter

- WSU – Jack Stevens 21-yard field goal, 5:16. Cougars 13-3, Drive: 9 plays, 74 yards, 4:54.
- WSU – Ademola Faleye 2-yard pass from Zevi Eckhaus (Jack Stevens kick), 1:01. Cougars 20-3, Drive: 7 plays, 48 yards, 2:15.

Third quarter

- No scoring plays.

Fourth quarter

- No scoring plays.

| Statistics | WSU | CSU |
|---|---|---|
| First downs | 19 | 20 |
| Plays–yards | 61–347 | 65–334 |
| Rushes–yards | 33–158 | 37–146 |
| Passing yards | 189 | 188 |
| Passing: comp–att–int | 16–28–0 | 19–28–0 |
| Turnovers | 0 | 1 |
| Time of possession | 31:23 | 28:37 |

| Team | Category | Player | Statistics |
|---|---|---|---|
| Washington State | Passing | Zevi Eckhaus | 16/28, 189 yards, 2 TD |
| Washington State | Rushing | Leo Pulalasi | 3 carries, 50 yards |
| Washington State | Receiving | Joshua Meredith | 4 receptions, 60 yards |
| Colorado State | Passing | Jackson Brousseau | 19/28, 188 yards |
| Colorado State | Rushing | Jalen Dupree | 13 carries, 68 yards |
| Colorado State | Receiving | Tommy Maher | 5 receptions, 51 yards |

=== at San Diego State ===
Colorado State Rams (1–3) at San Diego State Aztecs (3–1) – Game summary

| Quarter | 1 | 2 | 3 | 4 | Total |
|---|---|---|---|---|---|
| Rams | 0 | 10 | 0 | 14 | 24 |
| Aztecs | 7 | 21 | 10 | 7 | 45 |

at Snapdragon Stadium • San Diego, CA

- Date: October 3, 2025
- Game time: 7:30 p.m. PDT
- Game weather: Clear, 68 °F (20 °C), wind N 4 mph (6.4 km/h)
- Game attendance: 29,019
- Referee: Brad Carrell
- TV announcers (CBSSN): Chris Lewis (play-by-play), Robert Turbin (analyst), and Jordan Giorgio (sideline)

Game information

First quarter

- SDSU (5:56) – Donovan Brown 45-yard pass from Jayden Denegal (Gabriel Plascencia kick); Drive: 5 plays, 82 yards, 1:52 (Aztecs 7–0)

Second quarter

- SDSU (12:33) – Christian Washington 2-yard run (Gabriel Plascencia kick); Drive: 13 plays, 64 yards, 6:53 (Aztecs 14–0)
- CSU (11:24) – Armani Winfield 49-yard pass from Jackson Brousseau (Isaiah Hankins kick); Drive: 3 plays, 70 yards, 1:03 (Aztecs 14–7)
- SDSU (7:28) – Jordan Napier 42-yard pass from Jayden Denegal (Gabriel Plascencia kick); Drive: 7 plays, 73 yards, 3:41 (Aztecs 21–7)
- CSU (1:32) – Isaiah Hankins 30-yard field goal; Drive: 15 plays, 62 yards, 5:56 (Aztecs 21–10)
- SDSU (0:51) – Lucky Sutton 14-yard run (Gabriel Plascencia kick); Drive: 3 plays, 75 yards, 0:41 (Aztecs 28–10)

Third quarter

- SDSU (11:45) – Gabriel Plascencia 53-yard field goal; Drive: 9 plays, 30 yards, 3:09 (Aztecs 31–10)
- SDSU (4:43) – Lucky Sutton 1-yard run (Gabriel Plascencia kick); Drive: 12 plays, 75 yards, 6:11 (Aztecs 38–10)

Fourth quarter

- CSU (12:58) – Jackson Brousseau 4-yard run (Jackson Brousseau pass to Rocky Beers for two-point conversion); Drive: 14 plays, 75 yards, 6:45 (Aztecs 38–18)
- SDSU (10:21) – Byron Caldwell Jr. 20-yard run (Gabriel Plascencia kick); Drive: 4 plays, 59 yards, 2:10 (Aztecs 45–18)
- CSU (0:00) – Kory Hall 12-yard pass from Darius Curry; Drive: 11 plays, 88 yards, 2:57 (Aztecs 45–24)

| Statistics | CSU | SDSU |
|---|---|---|
| First downs | 22 | 24 |
| Plays–yards | 65–355 | 66–540 |
| Rushes–yards | 35–149 | 48–241 |
| Passing yards | 206 | 259 |
| Passing: Comp–Att–Int | 18–30–0 | 14–18–0 |
| Turnovers | 0 | 0 |
| Time of possession | 25:58 | 34:02 |

| Team | Category | Player | Statistics |
|---|---|---|---|
| Colorado State | Passing | Jackson Brousseau | 13/25, 155 yards, TD |
| Colorado State | Rushing | Jalen Dupree | 16 carries, 103 yards |
| Colorado State | Receiving | Armani Winfield | 2 receptions, 41 yards, TD |
| San Diego State | Passing | Jayden Denegal | 13/16, 256 yards, 2 TD |
| San Diego State | Rushing | Byron Caldwell Jr. | 15 carries, 129 yards, TD |
| San Diego State | Receiving | Jordan Napier | 7 receptions, 153 yards, TD |

=== Fresno State ===
Fresno State Bulldogs (5–1) at Colorado State Rams (1–4) – Game summary

| Quarter | 1 | 2 | 3 | 4 | Total |
|---|---|---|---|---|---|
| Bulldogs | 0 | 14 | 7 | 0 | 21 |
| Rams | 14 | 21 | 0 | 14 | 49 |

at Canvas Stadium • Fort Collins, CO

- Date: October 10, 2025
- Game time: 7:00 p.m. MDT
- Game weather: Cloudy
- Game attendance: 27,874
- Referee: Cal McNeill
- TV announcers (CBSSN): Chris Lewis (play-by-play) and Randy Cross (analyst)

Game information

First quarter

- (9:59) CSU – Justin Marshall 73-yard run, Isaiah Hankins kick (Drive: 3 plays, 86 yards, 1:23; Colorado State 7–0)
- (5:13) CSU – Javion Kinnard 29-yard pass from Jackson Brousseau, Isaiah Hankins kick (Drive: 5 plays, 53 yards, 1:17; Colorado State 14–0)

Second quarter

- (14:11) CSU – Rocky Beers 4-yard pass from Jackson Brousseau, Isaiah Hankins kick (Drive: 9 plays, 52 yards, 3:25; Colorado State 21–0)
- (11:42) FRES – Josiah Freeman 23-yard pass from E.J. Warner, Dylan Lynch kick (Drive: 5 plays, 76 yards, 2:21; Colorado State 21–7)
- (6:08) CSU – Rocky Beers 20-yard pass from Jackson Brousseau, Isaiah Hankins kick (Drive: 11 plays, 75 yards, 5:34; Colorado State 28–7)
- (5:58) CSU – Paul Tangelo 36-yard fumble return, Isaiah Hankins kick (Colorado State 35–7)
- (1:20) FRES – Josiah Freeman 26-yard pass from E.J. Warner, Dylan Lynch kick (Drive: 11 plays, 75 yards, 4:31; Colorado State 35–14)

Third quarter

- (5:51) FRES – Rayshon Luke 23-yard pass from E.J. Warner, Dylan Lynch kick (Drive: 9 plays, 73 yards, 3:35; Colorado State 35–21)

Fourth quarter

- (9:15) CSU – Lloyd Avant 12-yard run, Isaiah Hankins kick (Drive: 5 plays, 61 yards, 2:19; Colorado State 42–21)
- (1:12) CSU – Jalen Dupree 4-yard run, Isaiah Hankins kick (Drive: 2 plays, 7 yards, 0:48; Colorado State 49–21)

| Statistics | FRES | CSU |
|---|---|---|
| First downs | 28 | 15 |
| Plays–yards | 80–469 | 53–334 |
| Rushes–yards | 31–119 | 35–190 |
| Passing yards | 350 | 144 |
| Passing: Comp–Att–Int | 28–49–3 | 12–18–0 |
| Turnovers | 4 | 0 |
| Time of possession | 34:48 | 25:12 |

| Team | Category | Player | Statistics |
|---|---|---|---|
| Fresno State | Passing | E.J. Warner | 28/49, 350 yards, 3 TD, 3 INT |
| Fresno State | Rushing | Brandon Ramirez | 7 carries, 41 yards |
| Fresno State | Receiving | Josiah Freeman | 7 receptions, 89 yards, 2 TD |
| Colorado State | Passing | Jackson Brousseau | 12/18, 144 yards, 3 TD |
| Colorado State | Rushing | Justin Marshall | 7 carries, 93 yards, TD |
| Colorado State | Receiving | Javion Kinnard | 3 receptions, 72 yards, TD |

=== Hawaii ===
Hawaii Rainbow Warriors (5–2) at Colorado State Rams (2–4) – Game summary

| Quarter | 1 | 2 | 3 | 4 | Total |
|---|---|---|---|---|---|
| Rainbow Warriors | 7 | 7 | 10 | 7 | 31 |
| Rams | 7 | 0 | 0 | 12 | 19 |

at Canvas Stadium • Fort Collins, CO

- Date: October 18, 2025
- Game time: 5:00 p.m. MDT
- Game weather: Sunny, 55 °F (13 °C)
- Game attendance: 40,416
- Referee: Gary Reed
- TV announcers (Spectrum Sports): Kanoa Leahey (play-by-play) and Rich Miano (analyst)

Game information

First quarter

- (8:38) HAW – Nick Cenacle 17-yard pass from Micah Alejado, Kansei Matsuzawa kick (Drive: 10 plays, 65 yards, 5:25; Hawaii 7–0)
- (0:00) CSU – Javion Kinnard 91-yard punt return, Isaiah Hankins kick (Tied 7–7)

Second quarter

- (5:54) HAW – Jackson Harris 75-yard pass from Micah Alejado, Kansei Matsuzawa kick (Drive: 1 play, 75 yards, 0:12; Hawaii 14–7)

Third quarter

- (9:50) HAW – Jackson Harris 9-yard pass from Micah Alejado, Kansei Matsuzawa kick (Drive: 8 plays, 65 yards, 5:10; Hawaii 21–7)
- (3:09) HAW – Kansei Matsuzawa 26-yard field goal (Drive: 11 plays, 54 yards, 5:18; Hawaii 24–7)

Fourth quarter

- (11:58) CSU – Armani Winfield 7-yard pass from Jackson Brousseau, two-point conversion failed (Drive: 14 plays, 75 yards, 6:11; Hawaii 24–13)
- (6:50) CSU – Tahj Bullock 3-yard run, two-point conversion failed (Drive: 7 plays, 45 yards, 2:49; Hawaii 24–19)
- (2:23) HAW – Cam Barfield 35-yard run, Kansei Matsuzawa kick (Drive: 8 plays, 75 yards, 4:27; Hawaii 31–19)

| Statistics | HAW | CSU |
|---|---|---|
| First downs | 19 | 15 |
| Plays–yards | 66–435 | 63–261 |
| Rushes–yards | 28–134 | 34–85 |
| Passing yards | 301 | 176 |
| Passing: Comp–Att–Int | 26–38–1 | 15–29–0 |
| Turnovers | 1 | 1 |
| Time of possession | 34:59 | 25:01 |

| Team | Category | Player | Statistics |
|---|---|---|---|
| Hawaii | Passing | Micah Alejado | 26/38, 301 yards, 3 TD, INT |
| Hawaii | Rushing | Landon Sims | 12 carries, 59 yards |
| Hawaii | Receiving | Jackson Harris | 5 receptions, 109 yards, 2 TD |
| Colorado State | Passing | Jackson Brousseau | 15/29, 176 yards, TD |
| Colorado State | Rushing | Lloyd Avant | 8 carries, 50 yards |
| Colorado State | Receiving | Tay Lanier | 2 receptions, 56 yards |

=== at Wyoming (Border War) ===
Colorado State Rams (2–5) at Wyoming Cowboys (3–4) – Game summary

| Quarter | 1 | 2 | 3 | 4 | Total |
|---|---|---|---|---|---|
| Rams | 0 | 0 | 0 | 0 | 0 |
| Cowboys | 7 | 14 | 7 | 0 | 28 |

at War Memorial Stadium • Laramie, WY

- Date: October 25, 2025
- Game time: 5:30 p.m. MDT
- Game weather: Sunny • Temperature: 57 °F (14 °C) • Wind: SW 11 mph
- Game attendance: 25,609
- Referee: Patrick Foy
- TV announcers (CBSSN): Dave Ryan and Adam Breneman (analyst)

Game information

First quarter

- (2:43) WYO – Landon Sims 1-yard run, Erik Sandvik kick (Drive: 12 plays, 67 yards, 6:45; Wyoming 7–0)

Second quarter

- (14:15) WYO – Michael Fitzgerald 22-yard pass from Kaden Anderson, Erik Sandvik kick (Drive: 6 plays, 49 yards, 2:37; Wyoming 14–0)
- (0:36) WYO – Chris Durr 9-yard pass from Kaden Anderson, Erik Sandvik kick (Drive: 5 plays, 56 yards, 2:39; Wyoming 21–0)

Third quarter

- (10:51) WYO – Sam Scott 37-yard run, Erik Sandvik kick (Drive: 6 plays, 78 yards, 2:54; Wyoming 28–0)

Fourth quarter

- No scoring plays.

| Statistics | CSU | WYO |
|---|---|---|
| First downs | 15 | 18 |
| Plays–yards | 61–305 | 59–372 |
| Rushes–yards | 27–94 | 34–212 |
| Passing yards | 211 | 160 |
| Passing: Comp–Att–Int | 19–34–3 | 17–25–0 |
| Turnovers | 3 | 0 |
| Time of possession | 28:11 | 31:49 |

| Team | Category | Player | Statistics |
|---|---|---|---|
| Colorado State | Passing | Darius Curry | 9/16, 112 yards |
| Colorado State | Rushing | Justin Marshall | 6 carries, 33 yards |
| Colorado State | Receiving | Tay Lanier | 3 receptions, 56 yards |
| Wyoming | Passing | Kaden Anderson | 16/24, 154 yards, 2 TD |
| Wyoming | Rushing | Sam Scott | 3 carries, 68 yards, TD |
| Wyoming | Receiving | Chris Durr | 7 receptions, 67 yards, TD |

=== UNLV ===
UNLV Rebels (6–2) at Colorado State Rams (2–6) – Game summary

| Quarter | 1 | 2 | 3 | 4 | Total |
|---|---|---|---|---|---|
| Rebels | 0 | 21 | 14 | 7 | 42 |
| Rams | 7 | 3 | 0 | 0 | 10 |

at Canvas Stadium • Fort Collins, CO

- Date: November 8, 2025
- Game time: 7:30 p.m. MST
- Game attendance: 27,970
- Referee: Patrick Foy
- TV announcers (FS1): Dan Hellie (play-by-play) and Petros Papadakis (analyst)

Game information

First quarter

- CSU – Rocky Beers 3-yard pass from Jackson Brousseau (Isaiah Hankins kick), 9:07. Rams 7–0. Drive: 13 plays, 75 yards, 5:53.

Second quarter

- UNLV – Jai'Den Thomas 57-yard run (Ramon Villela kick), 12:53. Tied 7–7. Drive: 3 plays, 70 yards, 1:20.
- CSU – Isaiah Hankins 23-yard field goal, 9:33. Rams 10–7. Drive: 7 plays, 74 yards, 3:16.
- UNLV – Anthony Colandrea 5-yard run (Ramon Villela kick), 7:07. Rebels 14–10. Drive: 5 plays, 75 yards, 2:26.
- UNLV – Jaylon Glover 6-yard run (Ramon Villela kick), 1:55. Rebels 21–10. Drive: 7 plays, 38 yards, 3:03.

Third quarter

- UNLV – Troy Omeire 68-yard pass from Anthony Colandrea (Ramon Villela kick), 12:22. Rebels 28–10. Drive: 2 plays, 71 yards, 0:43.
- UNLV – Anthony Colandrea 2-yard run (Ramon Villela kick), 3:11. Rebels 35–10. Drive: 7 plays, 91 yards, 3:26.

Fourth quarter

- UNLV – Taeshaun Lyons 39-yard pass from Anthony Colandrea (Ramon Villela kick), 13:36. Rebels 42–10. Drive: 5 plays, 70 yards, 2:56.

| Statistics | UNLV | CSU |
|---|---|---|
| First downs | 23 | 16 |
| Plays–yards | 65–571 | 63–292 |
| Rushes–yards | 41–320 | 34–103 |
| Passing yards | 251 | 189 |
| Passing: Comp–Att–Int | 15–24–1 | 17–29–1 |
| Turnovers | 1 | 1 |
| Time of possession | 33:09 | 26:51 |

| Team | Category | Player | Statistics |
|---|---|---|---|
| UNLV | Passing | Anthony Colandrea | 15/22, 251 yards, 2 TD, INT |
| UNLV | Rushing | Jai'Den Thomas | 7 carries, 131 yards, TD |
| UNLV | Receiving | Troy Omeire | 1 reception, 68 yards, TD |
| Colorado State | Passing | Jackson Brousseau | 13/22, 153 yards, TD |
| Colorado State | Rushing | Jalen Dupree | 13 carries, 56 yards |
| Colorado State | Receiving | Rocky Beers | 4 receptions, 61 yards, TD |

=== at New Mexico ===
Colorado State Rams (2-7) at New Mexico Lobos (6–3) – Game summary

| Quarter | 1 | 2 | 3 | 4 | Total |
|---|---|---|---|---|---|
| Rams | 0 | 0 | 10 | 7 | 17 |
| Lobos | 0 | 10 | 0 | 10 | 20 |

at University Stadium • Albuquerque, NM

- Date: November 15, 2025
- Game time: 1:00 p.m. MST
- Game attendance: 27,526
- Referee: Nolan Dumas
- TV announcers (Altitude): Robert Portnoy (play-by-play) and DonTrell Moore (analyst)

Game information

First quarter

- No scoring plays.

Second quarter

- UNM – D.J. McKinney 1-yard run (Luke Drzewiecki kick), 6:17. Lobos 7–0. Drive: 12 plays, 77 yards, 6:11.
- UNM – Luke Drzewiecki 45-yard field goal, 0:01. Lobos 10–0. Drive: 8 plays, 52 yards, 1:46.

Third quarter

- CSU – Rocky Beers 3-yard pass from Darius Curry (Isaiah Hankins kick), 7:32. Lobos 10–7. Drive: 4 plays, 7 yards, 1:33.
- CSU – Isaiah Hankins 30-yard field goal, 0:18. Tied 10–10. Drive: 14 plays, 68 yards, 6:25.

Fourth quarter

- UNM – Jack Layne 12-yard run (Luke Drzewiecki kick), 10:32. Lobos 17–10. Drive: 4 plays, 21 yards, 2:12.
- UNM – Luke Drzewiecki 35-yard field goal, 8:27. Lobos 20–10. Drive: 4 plays, 1 yard, 0:46.
- CSU – Lloyd Avant 41-yard pass from Darius Curry (Isaiah Hankins kick), 5:09. Lobos 20–17. Drive: 8 plays, 75 yards, 3:18.

| Statistics | CSU | UNM |
|---|---|---|
| First downs | 19 | 15 |
| Plays–yards | 71–299 | 64–348 |
| Rushes–yards | 25–13 | 39–122 |
| Passing yards | 286 | 226 |
| Passing: Comp–Att–Int | 34–46–3 | 13–25–0 |
| Turnovers | 4 | 4 |
| Time of possession | 32:30 | 27:30 |

| Team | Category | Player | Statistics |
|---|---|---|---|
| Colorado State | Passing | Darius Curry | 26/34, 248 yards, 2 TD, 3 INT |
| Colorado State | Rushing | Lloyd Avant | 12 carries, 36 yards |
| Colorado State | Receiving | Rocky Beers | 7 receptions, 67 yards, TD |
| New Mexico | Passing | Jack Layne | 13/25, 226 yards |
| New Mexico | Rushing | D.J. McKinney | 17 carries, 52 yards, TD |
| New Mexico | Receiving | Keagan Johnson | 5 receptions, 65 yards |

=== at Boise State ===
Colorado State Rams (2-8) at Boise State Broncos (6-4) – Game summary

| Quarter | 1 | 2 | 3 | 4 | Total |
|---|---|---|---|---|---|
| Rams | 7 | 0 | 0 | 14 | 21 |
| Broncos | 7 | 20 | 7 | 15 | 49 |

at Albertsons Stadium • Boise, ID

- Date: November 22, 2025
- Game time: 5:00 p.m. MST
- Game weather: Sunny • Temperature: 52 °F (11 °C) • Wind: SE 3 mph
- Game attendance: 32,819
- Referee: Cal McNeill
- TV announcers (FS1): Chris Myers (play-by-play) and Spencer Tillman (analyst)

Game information

First quarter

- (8:55) BOIS - Sire Gaines 3-yard run, Colton Boomer kick (Drive: 14 plays, 79 yards, 6:01; Boise State 7-0)
- (5:27) CSU - Rocky Beers 3-yard pass from Darius Curry, Isaiah Hankins kick (Drive: 8 plays, 75 yards, 3:28; Tied 7-7)

Second quarter

- (11:32) BOIS - Malik Sherrod 1-yard run, Colton Boomer kick (Drive: 10 plays, 98 yards, 4:38; Boise State 14-7)
- (3:37) BOIS - Colton Boomer 27-yard field goal (Drive: 12 plays, 81 yards, 6:38; Boise State 17-7)
- (1:59) BOIS - Dylan Riley 2-yard run, Colton Boomer kick (Drive: 5 plays, 45 yards, 1:29; Boise State 24-7)
- (0:06) BOIS - Colton Boomer 32-yard field goal (Drive: 12 plays, 58 yards, 1:03; Boise State 27-7)

Third quarter

- (1:48) BOIS - Sire Gaines 8-yard run, Colton Boomer kick (Drive: 7 plays, 68 yards, 3:43; Boise State 34-7)

Fourth quarter

- (11:09) CSU - Lloyd Avant 4-yard run, Isaiah Hankins kick (Drive: 9 plays, 91 yards, 2:51; Boise State 34-14)
- (9:32) CSU - Tay Lanier 6-yard pass from Darius Curry, Isaiah Hankins kick (Drive: 5 plays, 49 yards, 1:36; Boise State 34-21)
- (5:48) BOIS - Malik Sherrod 24-yard run, Max Cutforth pass to Cameron Bates for two-point conversion (Drive: 6 plays, 27 yards, 3:43; Boise State 42-21)
- (2:29) BOIS - Seth Knothe 9-yard run, Colton Boomer kick (Drive: 5 plays, 25 yards, 2:53; Boise State 49-21)

| Statistics | CSU | BOIS |
|---|---|---|
| First downs | 17 | 32 |
| Plays–yards | 63–332 | 87–533 |
| Rushes–yards | 17–39 | 52–279 |
| Passing yards | 293 | 254 |
| Passing: Comp–Att–Int | 26-46-3 | 23-35-0 |
| Turnovers | 4 | 1 |
| Time of possession | 23:05 | 36:55 |

| Team | Category | Player | Statistics |
|---|---|---|---|
| Colorado State | Passing | Darius Curry | 26/46, 293 yards, 2 TD, 3 INT |
| Colorado State | Rushing | Darius Curry | 6 carries, 23 yards |
| Colorado State | Receiving | Rocky Beers | 7 receptions, 94 yards, TD |
| Boise State | Passing | Max Cutforth | 22/34, 239 yards |
| Boise State | Rushing | Sire Gaines | 22 carries, 149 yards, 2 TD |
| Boise State | Receiving | Latrell Caples | 7 receptions, 70 yards |

=== Air Force (Ram–Falcon Trophy) ===
Air Force Falcons (3-8) at Colorado State Rams (2-9) – Game summary

| Quarter | 1 | 2 | 3 | 4 | Total |
|---|---|---|---|---|---|
| Falcons | 14 | 7 | 7 | 14 | 42 |
| Rams | 0 | 7 | 7 | 7 | 21 |

at Canvas Stadium • Fort Collins, Colorado

- Date: November 28
- Game time: 1:00 p.m. MST
- Game weather: Sunny • Temperature: 54 °F (12 °C) • Wind: S at 5 miles per hour (8.0 km/h)
- Game attendance: 25,873
- Referee: Kenneth Ray
- TV announcers (FS1): Evan Lepler (play-by-play) and Lincoln Kennedy (analyst)

Game information

First quarter

- AFA – Bruin Fleischmann 55-yard pass from Josh Johnson (Reagan Tubbs kick), 9:50. Falcons 7–0. Drive: 8 plays, 75 yards, 5:10.
- AFA – Owen Allen 6-yard run (Reagan Tubbs kick), 2:26. Falcons 14–0. Drive: 10 plays, 68 yards, 6:08.

Second quarter

- CSU – Tay Lanier 20-yard pass from Jackson Brousseau (Isaiah Hankins kick), 8:48. Falcons 14–7. Drive: 13 plays, 75 yards, 6:00.
- AFA – Kemper Hodges 1-yard run (Reagan Tubbs kick), 0:14. Falcons 21–7. Drive: 17 plays, 75 yards, 8:34.

Third quarter

- CSU – Lloyd Avant 5-yard run (Isaiah Hankins kick), 11:19. Falcons 21–14. Drive: 9 plays, 75 yards, 3:41.
- AFA – Josh Johnson 3-yard run (Reagan Tubbs kick), 5:37. Falcons 28–14. Drive: 9 plays, 45 yards, 5:41.

Fourth quarter

- AFA – Bruin Fleischmann 6-yard pass from Josh Johnson (Reagan Tubbs kick), 9:09. Falcons 35–14. Drive: 13 plays, 80 yards, 7:59.
- CSU – Rocky Beers 28-yard pass from Jackson Brousseau (Isaiah Hankins kick), 6:51. Falcons 35–21. Drive: 5 plays, 75 yards, 2:18.
- AFA – Owen Allen 7-yard run (Reagan Tubbs kick), 3:05. Falcons 42–21. Drive: 8 plays, 56 yards, 3:44.

| Statistics | AFA | CSU |
|---|---|---|
| First downs | 22 | 17 |
| Plays–yards | 71–420 | 46–335 |
| Rushes–yards | 67–316 | 9–12 |
| Passing yards | 104 | 323 |
| Passing: Comp–Att–Int | 4–4–0 | 28–37–0 |
| Turnovers | 0 | 0 |
| Time of possession | 40:47 | 19:13 |

| Team | Category | Player | Statistics |
|---|---|---|---|
| Air Force | Passing | Josh Johnson | 4/4, 104 yards, 2 TD |
| Air Force | Rushing | Owen Allen | 25 carries, 107 yards, 2 TD |
| Air Force | Receiving | Bruin Fleischmann | 2 receptions, 61 yards, 2 TD |
| Colorado State | Passing | Jackson Brousseau | 28/37, 323 yards, 2 TD |
| Colorado State | Rushing | Lloyd Avant | 3 carries, 11 yards, TD |
| Colorado State | Receiving | Lloyd Avant | 8 receptions, 135 yards |
