= 2025 San Diego State Aztecs football team =

American college football season

2025 San Diego State Aztecs football

New Mexico Bowl, L 47–49 vs. North Texas
- Conference: Mountain West Conference
- Record: 9–4 (6–2 MW)
- Head coach: Sean Lewis (2nd season)
- Associate head coach: Zac Barton (2nd season)
- Offensive scheme: Veer and shoot
- Defensive coordinator: Rob Aurich (1st season)
- Base defense: 4–2–5
- Captains: Trey White; Ross Ulugalu-Maseuli; Chris Johnson; Tano Letuli; Jayden Denegal; DJ Herman
- Home stadium: Snapdragon Stadium

2025 Mountain West Conference football standings
	Conf.			Overall
Team	W		L	W		L
Boise State y$	6	–	2	9	–	5
UNLV y	6	–	2	10	–	4
San Diego State	6	–	2	9	–	4
New Mexico	6	–	2	9	–	4
Fresno State	5	–	3	9	–	4
Hawaii	5	–	3	9	–	4
Utah State	4	–	4	6	–	7
Air Force	3	–	5	4	–	8
Nevada	2	–	6	3	–	9
Wyoming	2	–	6	4	–	8
San Jose State	2	–	6	3	–	9
Colorado State	1	–	7	2	–	10
Championship: Boise State 38, UNLV 21
$ – Conference champion; y – Championship game participant; Rankings from CFP Rankings

The 2025 San Diego State Aztecs football team represented San Diego State University in the Mountain West Conference (MW) during the 2025 NCAA Division I FBS football season. Led by second-year head coach Sean Lewis, the Aztecs played home games at Snapdragon Stadium in San Diego.

The 2025 season will be the final season for the Aztecs in the Mountain West Conference as San Diego State will move to the Pac-12 Conference in 2026.

== Schedule ==
Date	Time	Opponent	Site	TV	Result	Attendance
August 28	7:00 p.m.	No. 24 (FCS) Stony Brook*	Snapdragon Stadium; San Diego, CA	KUSI/MW Network	W 42–0	20,624
September 6	7:15 p.m.	at Washington State*	Martin Stadium; Pullman, WA	The CW	L 13–36	24,330
September 20	7:30 p.m.	California*	Snapdragon Stadium; San Diego, CA	CBSSN	W 34–0	31,369
September 27	12:30 p.m.	at Northern Illinois*	Huskie Stadium; DeKalb, IL	ESPN+	W 6–3	13,512
October 3	7:30 p.m.	Colorado State	Snapdragon Stadium; San Diego, CA	CBSSN	W 45–24	29,019
October 11	7:30 p.m.	at Nevada	Mackay Stadium; Reno, NV	CBSSN	W 44–10	19,473
October 25	12:30 p.m.	at Fresno State	Valley Children's Stadium; Fresno, CA (rivalry)	FS1	W 23–0	41,535
November 1	4:00 p.m.	Wyoming^{†}	Snapdragon Stadium; San Diego, CA	CBSSN	W 24–7	24,325
November 8	8:00 p.m.	at Hawaii	Clarence T. C. Ching Athletics Complex; Honolulu, HI	KGTV/Spectrum/MW App	L 6–38	15,194
November 15	7:30 p.m.	Boise State	Snapdragon Stadium; San Diego, CA	CBSSN	W 17–7	29,201
November 22	7:30 p.m.	San Jose State	Snapdragon Stadium; San Diego, CA	FS1	W 25–3	22,595
November 28	12:30 p.m.	at New Mexico	University Stadium; Albuquerque, NM	CBSSN	L 17–23 ^{2OT}	30,575
December 27	2:45 p.m.	vs. No. 25 North Texas*	University Stadium; Albuquerque, NM (New Mexico Bowl)	ESPN	L 47–49	18,867
*Non-conference game; ^{†}Homecoming; Rankings from AP Poll - Released prior to game; All times are in Pacific time

== Preseason ==
=== Mountain West preseason media poll ===
The Mountain West's preseason media poll was released on July 16, 2025. San Diego State was predicted to finished eighth in the conference.

== Game summaries ==
=== No. 24 (FCS) Stony Brook ===
No. 24 (FCS) Stony Brook Seawolves (0–0) at San Diego State Aztecs (0–0) – Game summary

Quarter	1	2	3	4	Total
No. 24 (FCS) Seawolves	0	0	0	0	0
Aztecs	14	6	8	14	42

at Snapdragon Stadium • San Diego, CA

- Date: August 28, 2025
- Game time: 7:00 p.m. PDT
- Game weather: Cloudy, 81 °F (27 °C), wind N 3 mph (4.8 km/h)
- Game attendance: 20,624
- Referee: Kenneth Ray
- TV announcers (KUSI/MWN): Steve Quis (play-by-play) and J. R. Tolver (analyst)

Game information

First quarter

- SDSU (5:30) – Lucky Sutton 1-yard run (Gabriel Plascencia kick); Drive: 14 plays, 75 yards, 9:30 (Aztecs 7–0)
- SDSU (0:37) – Jacob Bostick 25-yard pass from Jayden Denegal (Gabriel Plascencia kick); Drive: 13 plays, 78 yards, 1:11 (Aztecs 14–0)

Second quarter

- SDSU (8:31) – Gabriel Plascencia 42-yard field goal; Drive: 5 plays, 45 yards, 1:35 (Aztecs 17–0)
- SDSU (1:09) – Gabriel Plascencia 35-yard field goal; Drive: 13 plays, 61 yards, 4:42 (Aztecs 20–0)

Third quarter

- SDSU (1:40) – Lucky Sutton 2-yard run (DJ Herman pass to Brady Anderson); Drive: 5 plays, 54 yards, 1:33 (Aztecs 28–0)

Fourth quarter

- SDSU (11:06) – Christian Washington 1-yard run (Gabriel Plascencia kick); Drive: 9 plays, 61 yards, 3:54 (Aztecs 35–0)
- SDSU (1:54) – Parker Threatt 5-yard run (Nick Clegg kick); Drive: 8 plays, 44 yards, 3:58 (Aztecs 42–0)

Statistics	STBK	SDSU
First downs	6	24
Plays–yards	53–95	83–464
Rushes–yards	28–49	54–228
Passing yards	46	236
Passing: Comp–Att–Int	9–25–0	16–29–0
Turnovers	0	0
Time of possession	23:55	36:05

Team	Category	Player	Statistics
Stony Brook	Passing	Casey Case	4/10, 25 yards
Stony Brook	Rushing	Roland Dempster	12 carries, 49 yards
Stony Brook	Receiving	Dez Williams	3 receptions, 26 yards
San Diego State	Passing	Jayden Denegal	13/25, 208 yards, TD
San Diego State	Rushing	Lucky Sutton	22 carries, 100 yards, 2 TD
San Diego State	Receiving	Jacob Bostick	3 receptions, 56 yards, TD

=== at Washington State ===
San Diego State Aztecs (1–0) at Washington State Cougars (1–0) – Game summary

Quarter	1	2	3	4	Total
Aztecs	7	0	6	0	13
Cougars	7	12	10	7	36

at Martin Stadium • Pullman, WA

- Date: September 6
- Game time: 7:15 p.m. PDT
- Game weather: Sunny, 80 °F (27 °C)
- Game attendance: 24,330
- Referee: Nolan Dumas
- TV announcers (The CW): Chris Fisher (play-by-play), Darius Walker (analyst), and Alex Brink (sideline)

Game information

First quarter

- SDSU (10:00) – Jacob Bostick 35-yard pass from Jayden Denegal (Gabriel Plascencia kick); Drive: 5 plays, 56 yards, 2:00 (Aztecs 7–0)
- WSU (5:18) – Trey Leckner 3-yard pass from Jaxon Potter (Jack Stevens kick); Drive: 6 plays, 48 yards, 2:49 (Tied 7–7)

Second quarter

- WSU (14:48) – Jack Stevens 49-yard field goal; Drive: 13 plays, 39 yards, 3:55 (Cougars 10–7)
- WSU (1:06) – Isaac Terrell 0-yard safety; (Cougars 12–7)
- WSU (0:26) – Trey Leckner 3-yard pass from Jaxon Potter (Jack Stevens kick); Drive: 4 plays, 62 yards, 0:32 (Cougars 19–7)

Third quarter

- WSU (10:55) – Leon Neal Jr. 18-yard pass from Jaxon Potter (Jack Stevens kick); Drive: 7 plays, 75 yards, 4:05 (Cougars 26–7)
- WSU (5:21) – Jack Stevens 42-yard field goal; Drive: 6 plays, 26 yards, 2:19 (Cougars 29–7)
- SDSU (0:57) – Jayden Denegal 1-yard run (Two-point run conversion failed); Drive: 10 plays, 75 yards, 4:24 (Cougars 29–13)

Fourth quarter

- WSU (2:48) – Julian Dugger 3-yard run (Jack Stevens kick); Drive: 12 plays, 42 yards, 6:17 (Cougars 36–13)

Statistics	SDSU	WSU
First downs	10	19
Plays–yards	60–215	78–396
Rushes–yards	30–82	36–139
Passing yards	133	257
Passing: Comp–Att–Int	15–30–0	28–42–0
Turnovers	0	0
Time of possession	24:54	35:06

Team	Category	Player	Statistics
San Diego State	Passing	Jayden Denegal	15/30, 133 yards, TD
San Diego State	Rushing	Lucky Sutton	15 carries, 88 yards
San Diego State	Receiving	Jordan Napier	7 receptions, 69 yards
Washington State	Passing	Jaxon Potter	28/42, 257 yards, 3 TD
Washington State	Rushing	Kirby Vorhees	13 carries, 67 yards
Washington State	Receiving	Joshua Meredith	8 receptions, 88 yards

=== California ===
California Golden Bears (3–0) at San Diego State Aztecs (1–1) – Game summary

Quarter	1	2	3	4	Total
Golden Bears	0	0	0	0	0
Aztecs	0	13	14	7	34

at Snapdragon Stadium • San Diego, CA

- Date: September 20
- Game time: 7:30 p.m. PDT
- Game weather: Clear, 71 °F (22 °C), wind N 3 mph (4.8 km/h)
- Game attendance: 31,369
- Referee: Tim Hedgepeth
- TV announcers (CBSSN): Alex Del Barrio (play-by-play), Randy Cross (analyst), and Lauren Green (sideline)

Game information

First quarter

- No scoring plays.

Second quarter

- SDSU (11:42) – Jordan Napier 6-yard pass from Jayden Denegal (Gabriel Plascencia kick); Drive: 3 plays, 80 yards, 1:37 (Aztecs 7–0)
- SDSU (6:20) – Gabriel Plascencia 34-yard field goal; Drive: 7 plays, 25 yards, 3:44 (Aztecs 10–0)
- SDSU (0:00) – Gabriel Plascencia 41-yard field goal; Drive: 9 plays, 51 yards, 3:49 (Aztecs 13–0)

Third quarter

- SDSU (11:03) – Dwayne McDougle 35-yard fumble recovery (Gabriel Plascencia kick); (Aztecs 20–0)
- SDSU (5:59) – Chris Johnson 97-yard interception (Gabriel Plascencia kick); (Aztecs 27–0)

Fourth quarter

- SDSU (9:20) – Lucky Sutton 3-yard run (Gabriel Plascencia kick); Drive: 12 plays, 76 yards, 6:08 (Aztecs 34–0)

Statistics	CAL	SDSU
First downs	17	15
Plays–yards	72–289	53–321
Rushes–yards	31–65	35–135
Passing yards	224	186
Passing: Comp–Att–Int	18–41–2	15–18–0
Turnovers	3	0
Time of possession	29:42	30:18

Team	Category	Player	Statistics
California	Passing	Jaron-Keawe Sagapolutele	17/38, 208 yards, 2 INT
California	Rushing	LJ Johnson Jr.	10 carries, 39 yards
California	Receiving	Trond Grizzell	4 receptions, 91 yards
San Diego State	Passing	Jayden Denegal	15/18, 189 yards, TD
San Diego State	Rushing	Lucky Sutton	12 carries, 61 yards, TD
San Diego State	Receiving	Jordan Napier	9 receptions, 154 yards, TD

=== at Northern Illinois ===
San Diego State Aztecs (2–1) at Northern Illinois Huskies (1–2) – Game summary

Quarter	1	2	3	4	Total
Aztecs	0	3	0	3	6
Huskies	3	0	0	0	3

at Huskie Stadium • DeKalb, IL

- Date: September 27
- Game time: 12:30 p.m. PDT
- Game weather: Sunny, 84 °F (29 °C), wind E 9 mph (14 km/h)
- Game attendance: 13,512
- Referee: Chris La Mange
- TV announcers (ESPN+): Jason Ross Jr. (play-by-play) and Tyoka Jackson (analyst)

Game information

First quarter

- NIU (7:10) – Andrew Glass 31-yard field goal; Drive: 16 plays, 62 yards, 7:50 (Huskies 3–0)

Second quarter

- SDSU (14:55) – Gabriel Plascencia 30-yard field goal; Drive: 13 plays, 63 yards, 7:15 (Tied 3–3)

Third quarter

No scoring plays

Fourth quarter

- SDSU (0:00) – Gabriel Plascencia 25-yard field goal; Drive: 7 plays, 49 yards, 1:44 (Aztecs 6–3)

Statistics	SDSU	NIU
First downs	19	10
Plays–yards	66–266	57–179
Rushes–yards	44–151	41–122
Passing yards	115	57
Passing: Comp–Att–Int	14–22–2	7–16–1
Turnovers	2	1
Time of possession	31:18	28:42

Team	Category	Player	Statistics
San Diego State	Passing	Jayden Denegal	13/20, 110 yards, 2 INT
San Diego State	Rushing	Lucky Sutton	17 carries, 88 yards
San Diego State	Receiving	Jordan Napier	6 receptions, 52 yards
Northern Illinois	Passing	Josh Holst	6/14, 49 yards
Northern Illinois	Rushing	Telly Johnson Jr.	16 carries, 53 yards
Northern Illinois	Receiving	DeAree Rogers	5 receptions, 51 yards

=== Colorado State ===
Colorado State Rams (1–3) at San Diego State Aztecs (3–1) – Game summary

Quarter	1	2	3	4	Total
Rams	0	10	0	14	24
Aztecs	7	21	10	7	45

at Snapdragon Stadium • San Diego, CA

- Date: October 3
- Game time: 7:30 p.m. PDT
- Game weather: Clear, 68 °F (20 °C), wind N 4 mph (6.4 km/h)
- Game attendance: 29,019
- Referee: Brad Carrell
- TV announcers (CBSSN): Chris Lewis (play-by-play), Robert Turbin (analyst), and Jordan Giorgio (sideline)

Game information

First quarter

- SDSU (5:56) – Donovan Brown 45-yard pass from Jayden Denegal (Gabriel Plascencia kick); Drive: 5 plays, 82 yards, 1:52 (Aztecs 7–0)

Second quarter

- SDSU (12:33) – Christian Washington 2-yard run (Gabriel Plascencia kick); Drive: 13 plays, 64 yards, 6:53 (Aztecs 14–0)
- CSU (11:24) – Armani Winfield 49-yard pass from Jackson Brousseau (Isaiah Hankins kick); Drive: 3 plays, 70 yards, 1:03 (Aztecs 14–7)
- SDSU (7:28) – Jordan Napier 42-yard pass from Jayden Denegal (Gabriel Plascencia kick); Drive: 7 plays, 73 yards, 3:41 (Aztecs 21–7)
- CSU (1:32) – Isaiah Hankins 30-yard field goal; Drive: 15 plays, 62 yards, 5:56 (Aztecs 21–10)
- SDSU (0:51) – Lucky Sutton 14-yard run (Gabriel Plascencia kick); Drive: 3 plays, 75 yards, 0:41 (Aztecs 28–10)

Third quarter

- SDSU (11:45) – Gabriel Plascencia 53-yard field goal; Drive: 9 plays, 30 yards, 3:09 (Aztecs 31–10)
- SDSU (4:43) – Lucky Sutton 1-yard run (Gabriel Plascencia kick); Drive: 12 plays, 75 yards, 6:11 (Aztecs 38–10)

Fourth quarter

- CSU (12:58) – Jackson Brousseau 4-yard run (Jackson Brousseau pass to Rocky Beers for two-point conversion); Drive: 14 plays, 75 yards, 6:45 (Aztecs 38–18)
- SDSU (10:21) – Byron Caldwell Jr. 20-yard run (Gabriel Plascencia kick); Drive: 4 plays, 59 yards, 2:10 (Aztecs 45–18)
- CSU (0:00) – Kory Hall 12-yard pass from Darius Curry; Drive: 11 plays, 88 yards, 2:57 (Aztecs 45–24)

Statistics	CSU	SDSU
First downs	22	24
Plays–yards	65–355	66–540
Rushes–yards	35–149	48–241
Passing yards	206	259
Passing: Comp–Att–Int	18–30–0	14–18–0
Turnovers	0	0
Time of possession	25:58	34:02

Team	Category	Player	Statistics
Colorado State	Passing	Jackson Brousseau	13/25, 155 yards, TD
Colorado State	Rushing	Jalen Dupree	16 carries, 103 yards
Colorado State	Receiving	Armani Winfield	2 receptions, 41 yards, TD
San Diego State	Passing	Jayden Denegal	13/16, 256 yards, 2 TD
San Diego State	Rushing	Byron Caldwell Jr.	15 carries, 129 yards, TD
San Diego State	Receiving	Jordan Napier	7 receptions, 153 yards, TD

=== at Nevada ===
San Diego State Aztecs (4–1) at Nevada Wolf Pack (1–4) – Game summary

Quarter	1	2	3	4	Total
Aztecs	14	21	9	0	44
Wolf Pack	0	0	0	10	10

at Mackay Stadium • Reno, NV

- Date: October 11
- Game time: 7:30 p.m. PDT
- Game weather: Cloudy, 50 °F (10 °C), wind NW 15 mph (24 km/h)
- Game attendance: 19,473
- Referee: Kenneth Ray
- TV announcers (CBSSN): John Sadak (play-by-play), Taylor McHargue (analyst), and Brandon Baylor (sideline)

Game information

First quarter

- SDSU (14:01) – Jordan Napier 75-yard punt return (Gabriel Plascencia kick); Drive: 3 plays, -2 yards, 0:59 (Aztecs 7–0)
- SDSU (7:11) – Chris Johnson 40-yard interception return (Gabriel Plascencia kick); Drive: 5 plays, 15 yards, 2:06 (Aztecs 14–0)

Second quarter

- SDSU (15:00) – Jayden Denegal 2-yard pass to Christian Washington (Gabriel Plascencia kick); Drive: 7 plays, 70 yards, 3:26 (Aztecs 21–0)
- SDSU (9:05) – Jayden Denegal 31-yard pass to Jacob Bostick (Gabriel Plascencia kick); Drive: 7 plays, 73 yards, 3:27 (Aztecs 28–0)
- SDSU (1:46) – Lucky Sutton 3-yard run (Gabriel Plascencia kick); Drive: 6 plays, 93 yards, 2:36 (Aztecs 35–0)

Third quarter

- SDSU (10:49) – Gabriel Plascencia 21-yard field goal; Drive: 10 plays, 64 yards, 4:11 (Aztecs 38–0)
- SDSU (7:05) – Gabriel Plascencia 45-yard field goal; Drive: 5 plays, 30 yards, 2:33 (Aztecs 41–0)
- SDSU (2:03) – Gabriel Plascencia 49-yard field goal; Drive: 7 plays, 34 yards, 3:33 (Aztecs 44–0)

Fourth quarter

- NEV (12:50) – Joe McFadden 34-yard field goal; Drive: 9 plays, 60 yards, 4:13 (Aztecs 44–3)
- NEV (2:32) – Jordan Brown 16-yard pass from Carter Jones (Joe McFadden kick); Drive: 10 plays, 81 yards, 3:10 (Aztecs 44–10)

Statistics	SDSU	NEV
First downs	19	15
Plays–yards	58–411	63–254
Rushes–yards	40–206	31–77
Passing yards	205	177
Passing: Comp–Att–Int	14–18–0	16–32–2
Turnovers	0	2
Time of possession	28:52	28:36

Team	Category	Player	Statistics
San Diego State	Passing	Jayden Denegal	14/17, 205 yards, 2 TD
San Diego State	Rushing	Lucky Sutton	16 carries, 76 yards, TD
San Diego State	Receiving	Jordan Napier	5 receptions, 110 yards
Nevada	Passing	Carter Jones	16/32, 177 yards, TD, 2 INT
Nevada	Rushing	Caleb Ramseur	8 carries, 35 yards
Nevada	Receiving	Jett Carpenter	3 receptions, 72 yards

=== at Fresno State (rivalry) ===
San Diego State Aztecs (5–1) at Fresno State Bulldogs (5–2) – Game summary

Quarter	1	2	3	4	Total
Aztecs	7	6	0	10	23
Bulldogs	0	0	0	0	0

at Valley Children's Stadium • Fresno, CA

- Date: October 25
- Game time: 12:30 p.m. PDT
- Game weather: Sunny, 70 °F (21 °C), wind SW 3 mph (4.8 km/h)
- Game attendance: 41,535
- Referee: Nolan Dumas
- TV announcers (FS1): Noah Reed (play-by-play) and Robert Smith (analyst)

Game information

First quarter

- (3:30) SDSU – Lucky Sutton 1-yard run, Gabriel Plascencia kick (Drive: 9 plays, 92 yards, 3:53; San Diego State 7–0)

Second quarter

- (12:20) SDSU – Gabe Plascencia 42-yard field goal (Drive: 10 plays, 52 yards, 5:07; San Diego State 10–0)
- (1:33) SDSU – Gabe Plascencia 50-yard field goal (Drive: 4 plays, 0 yards, 1:02; San Diego State 13–0)

Third quarter

- No scoring plays.

Fourth quarter

- (13:22) SDSU – Gabe Plascencia 27-yard field goal (Drive: 11 plays, 82 yards, 5:34; San Diego State 16–0)
- (13:22) SDSU – Tano Letuli 31-yard interception return, Gabe Plascencia kick (San Diego State 23–0)

Statistics	SDSU	FRES
First downs	21	14
Plays–yards	65–332	65–227
Rushes–yards	46–208	23–45
Passing yards	124	182
Passing: Comp–Att–Int	11–19–1	20–42–2
Turnovers	2	2
Time of possession	31:51	28:09

Team	Category	Player	Statistics
San Diego State	Passing	Jayden Denegal	11/19, 124 yards, INT
San Diego State	Rushing	Lucky Sutton	21 carries, 131 yards, TD
San Diego State	Receiving	Byron Cardwell Jr.	2 receptions, 59 yards
Fresno State	Passing	Carson Conklin	20/42, 182 yards, 2 INT
Fresno State	Rushing	Rayshon Luke	5 carries, 23 yards
Fresno State	Receiving	Rayshon Luke	5 receptions, 35 yards

=== Wyoming ===
Wyoming Cowboys (4–4) at San Diego State Aztecs (6–1) – Game summary

Quarter	1	2	3	4	Total
Cowboys	7	0	0	0	7
Aztecs	7	10	0	7	24

at Snapdragon Stadium • San Diego, CA

- Date: November 1
- Game time: 4:00 p.m. PDT
- Game weather: Sunny, 73 °F (23 °C), wind N 3 mph (4.8 km/h)
- Game attendance: 24,325
- Referee: Christian Watson
- TV announcers (CBSSN): John Sadak (play-by-play), Robert Turbin (analyst), and Jordan Giorgio (sideline)

Game information

First quarter

- WYO (10:29) – Sam Scott 3-yard pass from Landon Sims (Erik Sandvik kick); Drive: 8 plays, 75 yards, 4:31 (Cowboys 7–0)
- SDSU (3:32) – Byron Cardwell Jr. 24-yard pass from Jayden Denegal (Gabriel Plascencia kick); Drive: 1 play, 24 yards, 0:10 (Tied 7–7)

Second quarter

- SDSU (10:52) – Gabriel Plascencia 34-yard field goal; Drive: 6 plays, 21 yards, 2:59 (Aztecs 10–7)
- SDSU (3:10) – Jordan Napier 7-yard run (Gabriel Plascencia kick); Drive: 6 plays, 67 yards, 3:10 (Aztecs 17–7)

Third quarter

- No scoring plays.

Fourth quarter

- SDSU (2:55) – Lucky Sutton 50-yard run (Gabriel Plascencia kick); Drive: 3 plays, 61 yards, 1:01 (Aztecs 24–7)

Statistics	WYO	SDSU
First downs	9	16
Plays–yards	62–185	62–390
Rushes–yards	35–89	40–196
Passing yards	96	194
Passing: Comp–Att–Int	13–27–3	11–22–2
Turnovers	4	2
Time of possession	29:33	30:27

Team	Category	Player	Statistics
Wyoming	Passing	Kaden Anderson	12/24, 93 yards, 3 INT
Wyoming	Rushing	Landon Sims	4 carries, 52 yards
Wyoming	Receiving	Michael Fitzgerald	3 receptions, 46 yards
San Diego State	Passing	Jayden Denegal	11/22, 194 yards, TD, 2 INT
San Diego State	Rushing	Lucky Sutton	28 carries, 158 yards, TD
San Diego State	Receiving	Donovan Brown	2 receptions, 51 yards

=== at Hawaii ===
San Diego State Aztecs (7–1) at Hawaii Rainbow Warriors (6–3) – Game summary

Quarter	1	2	3	4	Total
Aztecs	3	3	0	0	6
Rainbow Warriors	14	10	14	0	38

at Clarence T.C. Ching Athletics Complex • Honolulu, HI

- Date: November 8
- Game time: 8:00 p.m. PST
- Game weather: Rain, 74 °F (23 °C), wind NE 11 mph (18 km/h)
- Game attendance: 15,194
- Referee: Cal McNeill
- TV announcers (KGTV/Spectrum/MW App): Kanoa Leahey (play-by-play) and Rich Miano (analyst)

Game information

First quarter

- (10:47) SDSU – Gabriel Plascencia 42-yard field goal; Drive: 4 plays, 1 yard, 1:22 (Aztecs 3–0)
- (6:37) HAW – Jackson Harris 9-yard pass from Micah Alejado (Kansei Matsuzawa kick); Drive: 9 plays, 75 yards, 4:10 (Rainbow Warriors 7–3)
- (2:14) HAW – Jackson Harris 34-yard pass from Micah Alejado (Kansei Matsuzawa kick); Drive: 7 plays, 70 yards, 2:44 (Rainbow Warriors 14–3)

Second quarter

- (14:56) SDSU – Gabriel Plascencia 43-yard field goal; Drive: 5 plays, 53 yards, 2:10 (Rainbow Warriors 14–6)
- (12:54) HAW – Jackson Harris 35-yard pass from Micah Alejado (Kansei Matsuzawa kick); Drive: 6 plays, 75 yards, 2:02 (Rainbow Warriors 21–6)
- (4:23) HAW – Kansei Matsuzawa 22-yard field goal; Drive: 16 plays, 76 yards, 7:32 (Rainbow Warriors 24–6)

Third quarter

- (14:49) HAW – Cam Barfield 86-yard kickoff return (Kansei Matsuzawa kick); (Rainbow Warriors 31–6)
- (2:07) HAW – Elijah Palmer 53-yard interception return (Kansei Matsuzawa kick); Drive: 4 plays, 7 yards, 1:06 (Rainbow Warriors 38–6)

Fourth quarter

No scoring plays

Statistics	SDSU	HAW
First downs	12	20
Plays–yards	62–267	69–386
Rushes–yards	34–135	35–130
Passing yards	132	256
Passing: Comp–Att–Int	10–28–2	22–34–1
Turnovers	4	1
Time of possession	26:54	33:06

Team	Category	Player	Statistics
San Diego State	Passing	Jayden Denegal	10/27, 132 yards, 2 INT
San Diego State	Rushing	Lucky Sutton	18 carries, 78 yards
San Diego State	Receiving	Donovan Brown	3 receptions, 60 yards
Hawaii	Passing	Micah Alejado	22/34, 256 yards, 3 TD, INT
Hawaii	Rushing	Cam Barfield	11 carries, 69 yards
Hawaii	Receiving	Jackson Harris	7 receptions, 130 yards, 3 TD

=== Boise State ===
Boise State Broncos (6–3) at San Diego State Aztecs (7–2) – Game summary

Quarter	1	2	3	4	Total
Broncos	0	7	0	0	7
Aztecs	0	14	0	3	17

at Snapdragon Stadium • San Diego, CA

- Date: November 15
- Game time: 7:30 p.m. PST
- Game weather: Cloudy, 62 °F (17 °C), wind N 2 mph (3.2 km/h)
- Game attendance: 29,201
- Referee: Kenneth Ray
- TV announcers (CBSSN): Rich Waltz (play-by-play), Robert Turbin (analyst), and Tiffany Blackmon (sideline)

Game information

First quarter

- No scoring plays.

Second quarter

- SDSU (13:15) – Jayden Denegal 1-yard run (Gabriel Plascencia kick); Drive: 6 plays, 80 yards, 3:01 (Aztecs 7–0)
- BOIS (5:29) – Dylan Riley 9-yard run (Colton Boomer kick); Drive: 14 plays, 75 yards, 7:46 (Tied 7–7)
- SDSU (1:10) – Jayden Denegal 8-yard run (Gabriel Plascencia kick); Drive: 11 plays, 71 yards, 4:13 (Aztecs 14–7)

Third quarter

- No scoring plays.

Fourth quarter

- SDSU (10:51) – Gabriel Plascencia 47-yard field goal; Drive: 9 plays, 39 yards, 5:25 (Aztecs 17–7)

Statistics	BOIS	SDSU
First downs	14	12
Plays–yards	59–268	56–294
Rushes–yards	41–170	46–277
Passing yards	104	17
Passing: Comp–Att–Int	12–18–0	6–10–0
Turnovers	0	0
Time of possession	31:05	28:55

Team	Category	Player	Statistics
Boise State	Passing	Max Cutforth	12/18, 104 yards
Boise State	Rushing	Dylan Riley	21 carries, 79 yards, TD
Boise State	Receiving	Chase Penry	3 receptions, 50 yards
San Diego State	Passing	Jayden Denegal	6/10, 17 yards
San Diego State	Rushing	Lucky Sutton	25 carries, 150 yards
San Diego State	Receiving	Mikey Welsh	3 receptions, 22 yards

=== San Jose State ===
San Jose State Spartans (3-7) at San Diego State Aztecs (8-2) – Game summary

Quarter	1	2	3	4	Total
Spartans	0	3	0	0	3
Aztecs	11	7	0	7	25

at Snapdragon Stadium • San Diego, CA

- Date: November 22
- Game time: 7:30 p.m. PST
- Game weather: Cloudy, 59 °F (15 °C), wind N 2 mph (3.2 km/h)
- Game attendance: 22,595
- Referee: Patrick Foy
- TV announcers (FS1): Dan Hellie (play-by-play) and Petros Papadakis (analyst)

Game information

First quarter

- SDSU (11:14) – Lucky Sutton 1-yard run (DJ Herman pass to Brady Anderson for two-point conversion); Drive: 6 plays, 20 yards, 2:44 (Aztecs 8–0)
- SDSU (0:08) – Gabriel Plascencia 35-yard field goal; Drive: 5 plays, 31 yards, 1:41 (Aztecs 11–0)

Second quarter

- SJSU (10:03) – Mathias Brown 37-yard field goal; Drive: 12 plays, 57 yards, 5:00 (Aztecs 11–3)
- SDSU (0:01) – Jayden Denegal 1-yard run (Gabriel Plascencia kick); Drive: 10 plays, 79 yards, 3:16 (Aztecs 18–3)

Third quarter

- No scoring plays.

Fourth quarter

- SDSU (2:03) – Christian Washington 8-yard run (Gabriel Plascencia kick); Drive: 5 plays, 45 yards, 1:51 (Aztecs 25–3)

Statistics	SJSU	SDSU
First downs	19	16
Plays–yards	74–268	60–248
Rushes–yards	36–133	44–167
Passing yards	135	81
Passing: Comp–Att–Int	20–38–2	8–16–0
Turnovers	2	0
Time of possession	32:38	27:22

Team	Category	Player	Statistics
San Jose State	Passing	Tama Amisone	15/27, 104 yards, INT
San Jose State	Rushing	Tama Amisone	13 carries, 75 yards
San Jose State	Receiving	Danny Scudero	12 receptions, 79 yards
San Diego State	Passing	Jayden Denegal	8/16, 81 yards
San Diego State	Rushing	Lucky Sutton	20 carries, 79 yards, TD
San Diego State	Receiving	Donovan Brown	2 receptions, 63 yards

=== at New Mexico ===
San Diego State Aztecs (9-2) at New Mexico Lobos (8-3) – Game summary

Quarter	1	2	3	4	OT	2OT	Total
Aztecs	0	14	3	0	0	0	17
Lobos	3	7	7	0	0	6	23

at University Stadium • Albuquerque, NM

- Date: November 28
- Game time: 12:30 p.m. PDT
- Game weather: Sunny, 58 °F (14 °C), wind SW 6 mph (9.7 km/h)
- Game attendance: 30,575
- Referee: Gary Reed
- TV announcers (CBSSN): Jack Gordon (play-by-play) and Randy Cross (analyst)

Game information

First quarter

- UNM (7:25) – Luke Drzewiecki 37-yard field goal; Drive: 12 plays, 55 yards, 7:35 (Lobos 3–0)

Second quarter

- UNM (13:15) – James Laubstein 40-yard run (Luke Drzewiecki kick); Drive: 5 plays, 65 yards, 1:55 (Lobos 10–0)
- SDSU (7:26) – Lucky Sutton 1-yard run (Gabriel Plascencia kick); Drive: 6 plays, 55 yards, 3:16 (Lobos 10–7)
- SDSU (0:59) – Donovan Brown 46-yard pass from Jayden Denegal (Gabriel Plascencia kick); Drive: 8 plays, 70 yards, 4:14 (Aztecs 14–10)

Third quarter

- UNM (8:59) – D.J. McKinney 54-yard run (Luke Drzewiecki kick); Drive: 6 plays, 80 yards, 2:09 (Lobos 17–14)
- SDSU (0:51) – Gabriel Plascencia 44-yard field goal; Drive: 7 plays, 44 yards, 2:35 (Tied 17–17)

Fourth quarter

- No scoring plays.

First overtime

- No scoring plays.

Second overtime

- UNM – Cade Keith 25-yard pass from Jack Layne (Two-point pass conversion failed); Drive: 1 play, 25 yards (Lobos 23–17)

Statistics	SDSU	UNM
First downs	20	16
Plays–yards	66–355	60–308
Rushes–yards	42–193	35–181
Passing yards	162	127
Passing: Comp–Att–Int	14–24–1	14–25–0
Turnovers	2	1
Time of possession	31:28	28:32

Team	Category	Player	Statistics
San Diego State	Passing	Jayden Denegal	14/24, 162 yards, TD, INT
San Diego State	Rushing	Lucky Sutton	22 carries, 110 yards, TD
San Diego State	Receiving	Donovan Brown	5 receptions, 91 yards, TD
New Mexico	Passing	Jack Layne	14/25, 127 yards, TD
New Mexico	Rushing	James Laubstein	10 carries, 70 yards, TD
New Mexico	Receiving	Keagan Johnson	3 receptions, 37 yards

=== vs. No. 25 North Texas (New Mexico Bowl) ===
2025 Isleta New Mexico Bowl
No. 25 North Texas Mean Green (11-2) vs. San Diego State Aztecs (9-3) – Game summary

Quarter	1	2	3	4	Total
No. 25 Mean Green	21	7	14	7	49
Aztecs	6	14	0	27	47

at University Stadium • Albuquerque, NM

- Date: December 27
- Game time: 2:45 p.m. PDT
- Game weather: Cloudy • Temperature: 53 °F (12 °C) • Wind: 5 mph (8.0 km/h) southwest
- Game attendance: 18,867
- Referee: Andrew Speciale
- TV announcers (ESPN): Lowell Galindo (play-by-play), Aaron Murray (analyst) and Lauren Sisler (sideline)

Game information

First quarter

- UNT – Caleb Hawkins 9-yard run (Miguel Arenas kick), 11:32. Mean Green 7–0. Drive: 12 plays, 68 yards, 3:24.
- SDSU – Bert Emanuel Jr. 8-yard run (pass failed), 6:57. Mean Green 7–6. Drive: 10 plays, 65 yards, 4:35.
- UNT – Ashton Gray 17-yard run (Miguel Arenas kick), 3:18. Mean Green 14–6. Drive: 10 plays, 75 yards, 3:39.
- UNT – Caleb Hawkins 23-yard pass from Drew Mestemaker (Miguel Arenas kick), 0:10. Mean Green 21–6. Drive: 5 plays, 67 yards, 2:02.

Second quarter

- SDSU – Bert Emanual Jr. 72-yard run (Gabriel Plascencia kick), 14:49. Mean Green 21–13. Drive: 2 plays, 75 yards, 0:21.
- UNT – Ashton Gray 51-yard run (Miguel Arenas kick), 13:28. Mean Green 28–13. Drive: 5 plays, 75 yards, 1:21.
- SDSU – Jackson Ford 3-yard pass from Kyle Crum (Gabriel Plascencia kick), 4:36. Mean Green 28–20. Drive: 15 plays, 68 yards, 6:31.

Third quarter

- UNT – Caleb Hawkins 3-yard run (Miguel Arenas kick), 6:34. Mean Green 35–20. Drive: 11 plays, 43 yards, 4:21.
- UNT – Cameron Dorner 1-yard pass from Drew Mestemaker (Miguel Arenas kick), 0:03. Mean Green 42–20. Drive: 5 plays, 75 yards, 2:11.

Fourth quarter

- SDSU – Kyle Crum 11-yard run (Gabriel Plascencia kick), 12:03. Mean Green 42–27. Drive: 4 plays, 71 yards, 1:29.
- SDSU – Nathan Acevedo 63-yard punt return (Gabriel Plascencia kick), 10:41. Mean Green 42–34.
- UNT – Cameron Dorner 31-yard pass from Drew Mestemaker (Miguel Arenas kick), 6:08. Mean Green 49–34. Drive: 11 plays, 74 yards, 4:33.
- SDSU – Christian Washington 11-yard run (run failed), 4:39. Mean Green 49–40. Drive: 6 plays, 75 yards, 1:29.
- SDSU – Kyle Crum 1-yard run (Gabriel Plascencia kick), 0:01. Mean Green 49–47. Drive: 14 plays, 82 yards, 1:49.

Statistics	UNT	SDSU
First downs	28	25
Plays–yards	97–618	82–532
Rushes–yards	48–368	46–326
Passing yards	250	206
Passing: comp–att–int	27–49–2	18–36–2
Turnovers	2	3
Time of possession	32:32	27:28

Team	Category	Player	Statistics
North Texas	Passing	Drew Mestemaker	27/47, 250 yards, 3 TD, 2 INT
North Texas	Rushing	Caleb Hawkins	30 carries, 198 yards, 2 TD
North Texas	Receiving	Cameron Dorner	6 receptions, 66 yards, 2 TD
San Diego State	Passing	Kyle Crum	14/29, 169 yards, TD, 2 INT
San Diego State	Rushing	Bert Emanuel Jr.	11 carries, 170 yards, 2 TD
San Diego State	Receiving	Nathan Acevedo	4 receptions, 61 yards

== Personnel ==
=== Transfers ===
==== Outgoing ====
Player	Position	Destination
Ryan Dirksen	OL	Bryant
Tayvion Beasley	S	BYU
Tayten Beyer	CB	Cal Poly
Jake Sinz	LB	Colorado Mesa
Louis Brown IV	WR	Colorado State
Phillippe Wesley	WR	Delaware State
Ryan Gaea	DL	Duquesne
Keion Mitchell	DL	Howard
Kai Holec	OT	Indiana State
Kenan Christon	RB	Jackson State
AJ Duffy	QB	New Haven
Javance Tupou'ata-Johnson	QB	North Dakota
Bennett Walker	DB	North Dakota
Jaylon Armstead	RB	Portland State
Malik Gucake	EDGE	Prairie View A&M
Dean Abdullah	OL	Sacramento State
Logan Tanner	TE	Sacramento State
Wyatt Draeger	DL	Towson
Darrion Dalton	DL	Washington State
Dominic Oliver	DE	Western Kentucky
Baylin Brooks	WR	Western Michigan
Jason Mitchell	S	Western Michigan
Danny O'Neil	QB	Wisconsin
Tupu Alualu	DL	Unknown
Cam Davis	RB	Unknown
Ezekiel Larry	DE	Unknown
Danny Niu	LB	Unknown
Brian Pierce	WR	Unknown
Bobby Shaw	WR	Unknown
Brady Anderson	LB	Withdrawn
Josh Hunter	DB	Withdrawn
Nino Remigio	WR	Withdrawn

==== Incoming ====
Player	Position	Previous school
Connor Irons	TE	Air Force
Mason Baker	OL	American River CC
Byron Cardwell	RB	California
Bert Emanuel Jr.	QB	Central Michigan
Kainoa Davis	DL	Charlotte
Christian Washington	RB	Coastal Carolina
August Salvati	EDGE	Florida Atlantic
Nathan Acevedo	WR	Fresno State
Niles King	DE	Grand Valley State
Malachi Finau	DL	Hawaii
Camren May	OT	Howard
Dwayne McDougle	S	Idaho
Mister Williams	LB	Incarnate Word
Jayden Denegal	QB	Michigan
Dallas Fincher	OL	Michigan State
Oberhiri Eyafe	DB	Minnesota
Donovan Brown	WR	Monroe
Josiah Cox	S	New Mexico State
Hunter Green	P	Northern Colorado
Trayvon Rudolph	WR	Northern Illinois
Myles Kitt-Denton	WR	Northwestern State
Seth Adams	TE	Southeastern Louisiana
Kalan Ellis	IOL	Syracuse
Jacob Bostick	WR	Texas A&M
Jackson Ford	TE	Tulsa
Tanner Williams	LB	Utah State
Abayomi Kannike	OL	Utah Tech
Michael Watkins	IOL	Washington
Hunter Haines	DB	Washington State
