= D. J. Herman =

American football player (born 2002)

No. 34 – Miami Dolphins
- Position: Fullback
- Roster status: Active

Personal information
- Born: March 17, 2002 (age 24); Voorhees, New Jersey, U.S.
- Listed height: 6 ft 1 in (1.85 m)
- Listed weight: 242 lb (110 kg)

Career information
- High school: Bishop Gorman (Las Vegas, Nevada)
- College: San Diego State (2021–2025)
- NFL draft: 2026: undrafted

Career history
- Miami Dolphins (2026–present)

Career NFL statistics as of Week 10, 2026
- Receptions: 2
- Receiving yards: 28
- Stats at Pro Football Reference

David Scott Herman Jr. (born March 17, 2002) is an American professional football fullback for the Miami Dolphins of the National Football League (NFL). He played college football for the San Diego State Aztecs.

== Early life ==
Herman was born on March 17, 2002, in Voorhees, New Jersey. He attended Bishop Gorman High School in Las Vegas, Nevada. As a three-star recruit, Herman committed to played college football at San Diego State University.

== College career ==
Herman played college football for the San Diego State Aztecs from 2021 to 2025 at linebacker. He played in 49 games, recording 56 tackles, including one for loss, and two pass deflections.

== Professional career ==
Pre-draft measurables
Height	Weight	Arm length	Hand span	Wingspan	40-yard dash	10-yard split	20-yard split	20-yard shuttle	Three-cone drill	Vertical jump	Broad jump	Bench press
6 ft 0 5/8 in (1.84 m)	235 lb (107 kg)	29 7/8 in (0.76 m)	9 3/8 in (0.24 m)	6 ft 2 1/2 in (1.89 m)	4.87 s	1.71 s	2.86 s	4.39 s	7.26 s	29.0 in (0.74 m)	9 ft 3 in (2.82 m)	23 reps
All values from Pro Day

After not being selected in the 2026 NFL draft, Herman had a tryout with the Miami Dolphins and signed with the Dolphins as an undrafted free agent. After signing with the Dolphins, Herman moved from his collegiate position of linebacker to fullback and made the Dolphins' initial 53-man roster.

Herman made his NFL debut in Week 1 of the 2026 NFL season in a 27-13 loss to the Las Vegas Raiders and played 15 snaps on offense and 3 snaps on special teams. He made his first start in Week 2 against the San Francisco 49ers, where he also recorded his first reception for 18 yards, in a 35-13 loss.
