= Jayden Denegal =

American football player (born 2004)

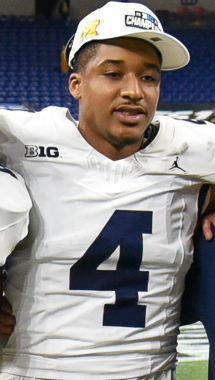
- Denegal with Michigan after the 2023 Big Ten Championship

No. 4 – San Diego State Aztecs
- Position: Quarterback
- Class: Redshirt Senior

Personal information
- Born: April 19, 2004 (age 22)
- Listed height: 6 ft 5 in (1.96 m)
- Listed weight: 230 lb (104 kg)

Career information
- High school: Apple Valley (Apple Valley, California)
- College: Michigan (2022–2024); San Diego State (2025–present)

Awards and highlights
- CFP national champion (2023)
- Stats at ESPN

Jayden Denegal (born April 19, 2004) is an American college football quarterback for the San Diego State Aztecs. He previously played for the Michigan Wolverines.

== Early life ==
Denegal attended Apple Valley High School in Apple Valley, California. Coming out of high school, he was rated as a four-star recruit, the 19th overall quarterback, and the 265th overall player in the class of 2022, and committed to play college football for the Michigan Wolverines over offers from other schools such as Arkansas, Auburn, Michigan State, and Utah.

== College career ==
=== Michigan ===
Denegal began his true freshman season at Michigan under head coach Jim Harbaugh in 2022, making his only appearance in a Week 3 matchup against UConn. Denegal was one of eight quarterbacks used by Harbaugh in the game, although he was the only one not to record a statistic. His lone appearance allowed him to preserve his redshirt.

In 2023, Denegal competed with Davis Warren and Alex Orji for playing time behind starter J. J. McCarthy and backup Jack Tuttle. He threw his first collegiate touchdown pass in a Week 5 victory over Nebraska, connecting with Peyton O'Leary on an 8-yard touchdown pass. Denegal appeared in six games during the season, completing four of five passes for 50 yards and one touchdown as Michigan went 15–0 and won the College Football Playoff National Championship.

In 2024, Denegal did not appear in any contests and entered the NCAA transfer portal on December 9, 2024. He finished his Michigan career with seven appearances, completing four of five pass attempts for 50 yards and a touchdown while rushing four times for 10 yards.

=== San Diego State ===
Denegal passing during San Diego State's game at UCLA in 2026

Denegal throwing a pass during San Diego State's game at UCLA in 2026

On December 19, 2024, Denegal committed to play for the San Diego State Aztecs. He competed with fellow transfer Bert Emanuel Jr. for the starting quarterback job, with head coach Sean Lewis naming Denegal the starter prior to the season. In the 2025 season opener against Stony Brook, he completed 13 of 25 passes for 207 yards and a touchdown in the win. Following a Week 2 loss to Washington State, Denegal led the Aztecs to six consecutive wins and eight victories in their next nine games before a double-overtime loss to New Mexico in the regular-season finale. He started all 12 regular-season games, completing 143 of 243 passes for 1,807 yards, nine touchdowns and eight interceptions, while rushing for 99 yards and four touchdowns as San Diego State finished 9–3. Denegal missed the 2025 New Mexico Bowl against North Texas after undergoing surgery on a shoulder injury sustained earlier in the season.

=== Statistics ===
Season	Team	Games			Passing								Rushing			
Season	Team	GP	GS	Record	Cmp	Att	Pct	Yds	Y/A	TD	Int	Rtg	Att	Yds	Avg	TD
2022	Michigan	1	0	—	Redshirted (redshirt)											
2023	Michigan	6	0	—	4	5	80.0	50	10.0	1	0	230.0	4	10	2.5	0
2024	Michigan	0	0	—	DNP											
2025	San Diego State	12	12	9–3	143	243	58.8	1,807	7.4	9	8	126.9	67	99	1.5	4
2026	San Diego State	7	7	3–4	83	151	55.0	899	6.0	7	5	114.1	27	27	1.0	0
Career		26	19	12–7	230	399	57.6	2,756	6.9	17	13	123.2	98	136	1.4	4
