= Dan Hellie =

American sports anchor

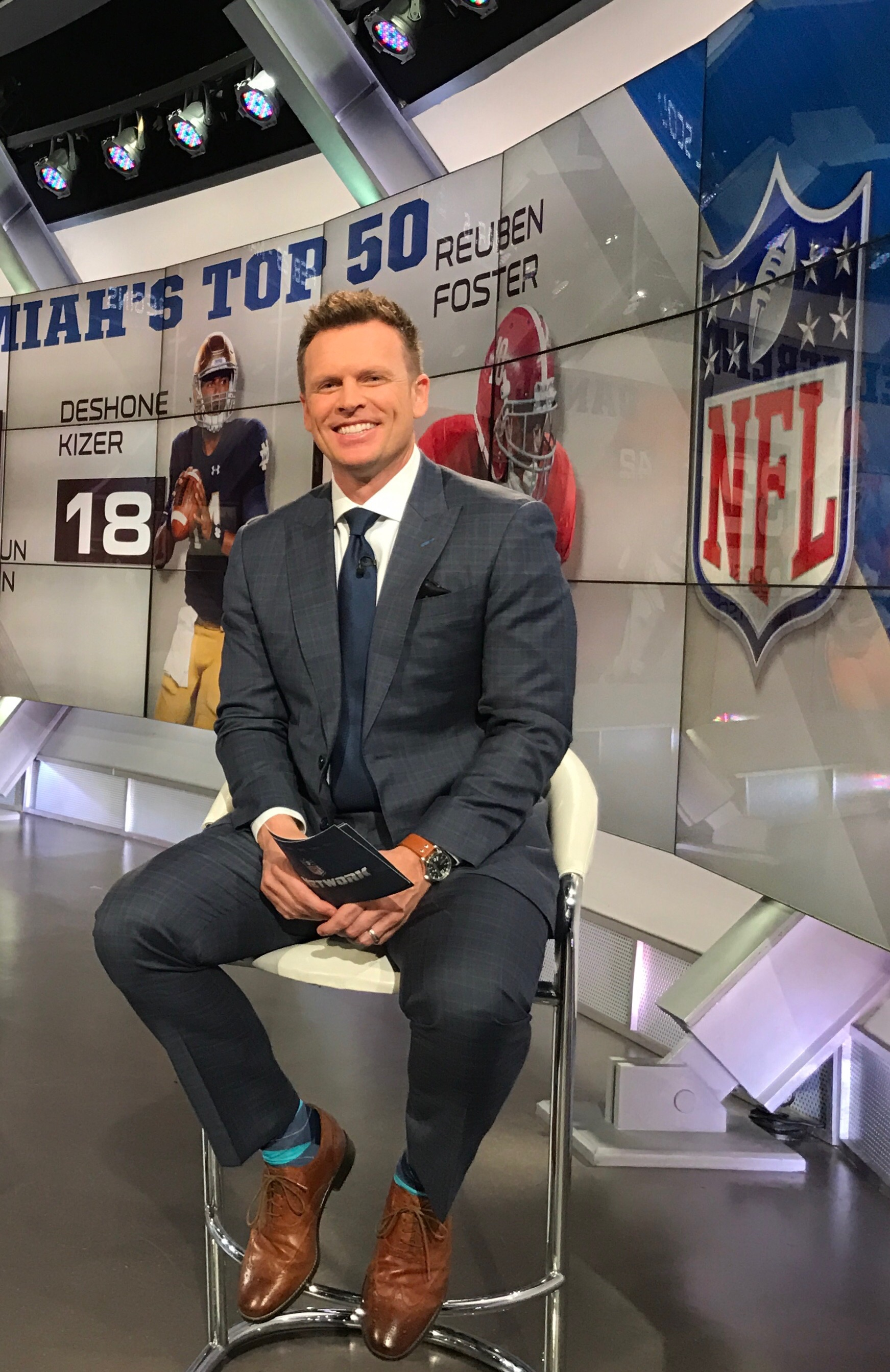
- Hellie on NFL Total Access
- Born: May 23, 1975 (age 50); Manila, Philippines
- Occupation: Sports anchor and reporter
- Notable credit: Sports anchor-reporter for WRC-TV (2006–2013) Anchor-reporter for NFL Network (2013–2020)
- Children: 2
- Website: www.nfl.com/nflnetwork/onairtalent/dan-hellie

Dan Hellie (born May 23, 1975) is an American sports announcer for Fox Sports and the UFC. Hellie can also be seen on Dana White's UFC Tuesday Night Contender Series, Tennessee Titans preseason games and college football games on Fox. He was a sports anchor for WRC-TV, an NBC affiliate in Washington, D.C.

== Early life ==
Hellie was born in Manila, Philippines, where his parents were stationed while in the Peace Corps. Hellie moved to Shoshone, Idaho until he was in fourth grade, then to Gaithersburg, Maryland. His mother was a middle school teacher for Montgomery County and his father worked at the Interior Department. He attended Magruder High School, where he played football, basketball and baseball. Hellie attended the University of Tennessee, where he was a member of the Phi Gamma Delta fraternity. He earned a bachelor's degree in broadcast journalism. In 2014, Hellie was awarded the University of Tennessee Alumni Promise Award.

== Early career ==
Hellie began his career in Alexandria, Minnesota, as an editor, producer and reporter. After nine months, he moved to Florence, South Carolina, as a sports reporter-anchor for WPDE. After two years, Hellie moved to Florida, first working in West Palm Beach at WPTV then, in 2003, as sports director at WFTV in Orlando. While at WFTV, Hellie where voted best sportscaster in Florida by the Associated Press and most popular sportscaster by the Orlando Sentinel. In 2005, he was named best sportscaster in Florida. Hellie received an Associated Press award for best feature story for a segment he did on bull riding in which he rode a bull for eight seconds.

In July 2006, Hellie moved to WRC-TV in Washington D.C. area where he served as an anchor-reporter.

In 2011, Hellie was awarded Emmys for Outstanding Sports Anchor and Outstanding Sports Daily or Weekly Programs. Hellie hosted the Redskins Coaches Show.

== Current career ==
Hellie works for the NFL Network, where he co-anchors the flagship show NFL Total Access with Lindsay Rhodes (2018). Hellie has contributed to several segments nominated for Emmy awards nominations on NFL Total Access, including Emmys for Outstanding Studio Show-Daily and the Shorty Award for Best Social Integration with Live Television.

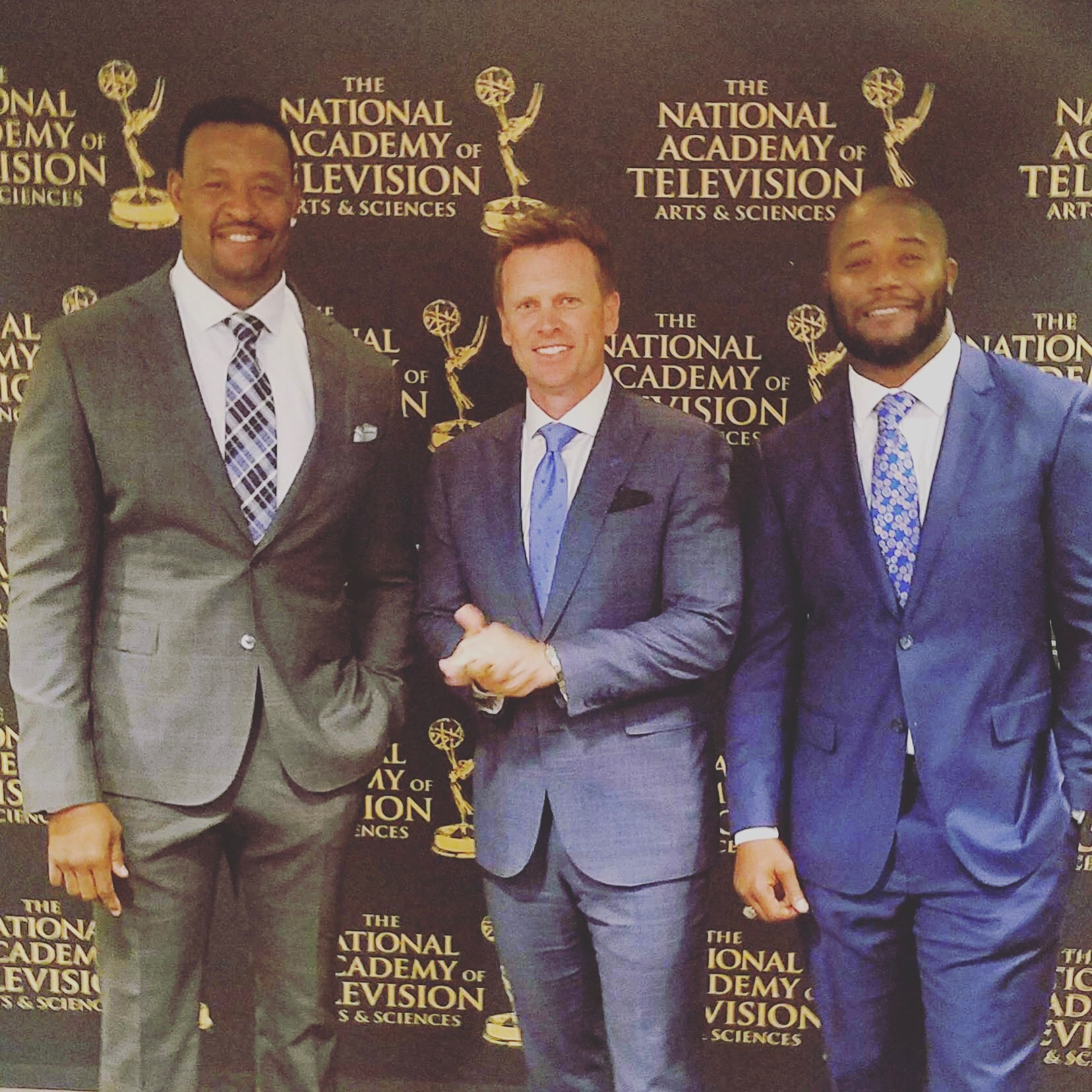
Willie McGinest, Dan Hellie and Michael Robinson

Hellie is the play-by-play announcer for Tennessee Titans preseason games with fellow NFL Network analyst Charles Davis. He also calls NFL games for FOX. Hellie regularly calls CFB games for FOX as well.

On July 11, 2017, Hellie joined former UFC Lightweight Yves Edwards to launch Dana White's Tuesday Night Contender series which aired digitally on UFC Fight Pass. Hellie teamed with Snoop Dogg and UFC Hall of Fame Inductee Urijah Faber on the series.

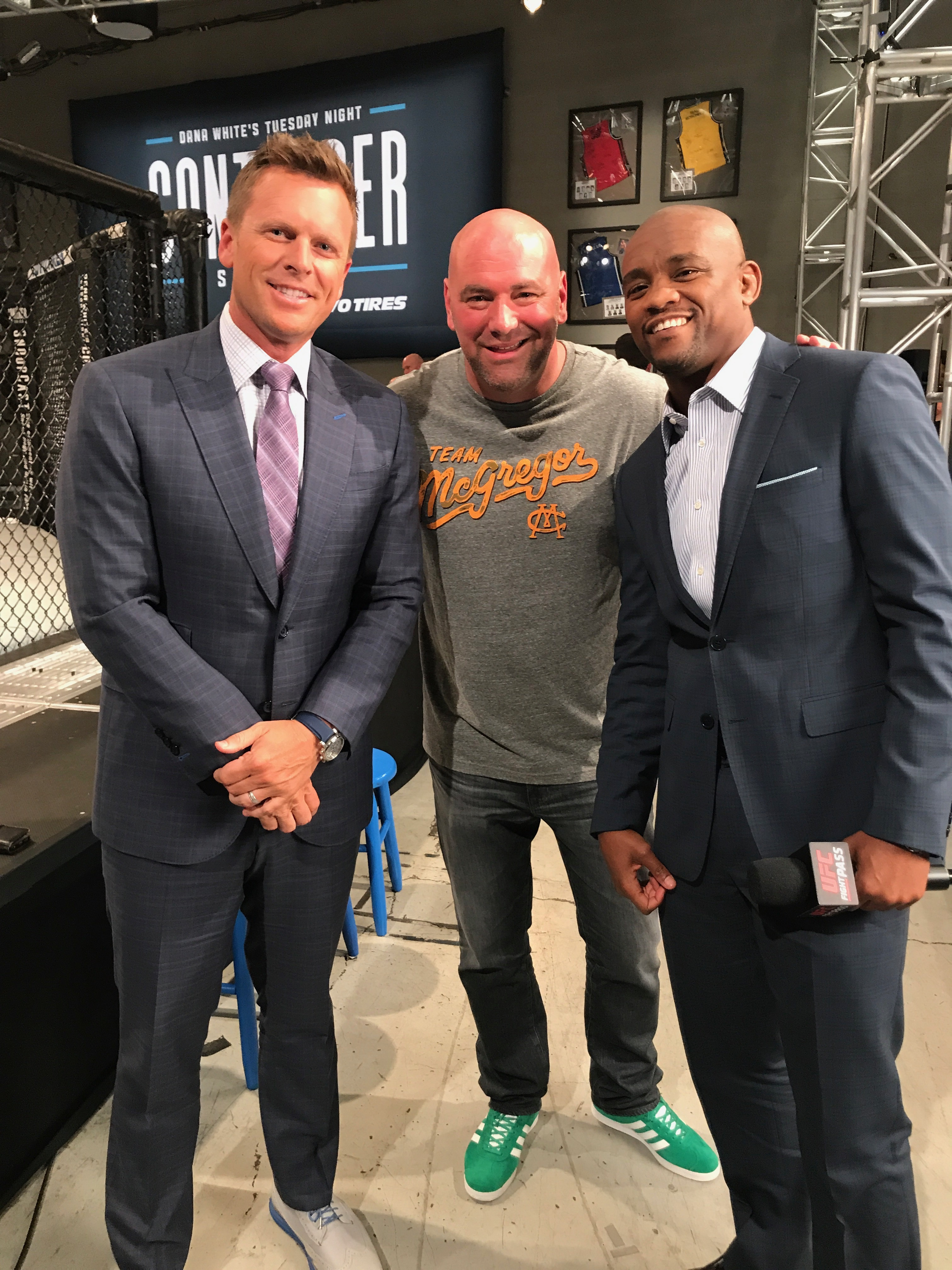
Dan Hellie, Dana White and Yves Edwards

Hellie is the host of the UFC's official Weigh-In Show, which is done for most pay-per-view events. He is joined by Laura Sanko, Daniel Cormier and a special guest analyst.

Hellie also calls college basketball on Fox.

Since March 2023, Hellie has hosted all Power Slap slap-fighting events alongside Michael Bisping.

== Personal life ==
Hellie resides in Manhattan Beach, California, with his wife and their two children. In 2008, Hellie presented the commencement speech at his alma mater, Magruder High School. Hellie was inducted into the Magruder Athletic Hall of Fame on October 26, 2012.
