= Lucky Sutton =

American football player (born 2004)

No. 7 – San Diego State Aztecs
- Position: Running back
- Class: Redshirt Senior

Personal information
- Born: June 16, 2004 (age 22); San Diego, California, U.S.
- Listed height: 6 ft 1 in (1.85 m)
- Listed weight: 225 lb (102 kg)

Career information
- High school: Cathedral Catholic (San Diego)
- College: San Diego State (2022–present)

Awards and highlights
- First-team All-Mountain West (2025)
- Stats at ESPN

Lucky Sutton (born June 16, 2004) is an American football running back for the San Diego State Aztecs.

== Early life ==
Sutton attended Cathedral Catholic High School located in San Diego, California. Coming out of high school, he was rated as a three-star recruit and the 48th overall running back in the class of 2022, where he committed to play college football for the San Diego State Aztecs.

== College career ==
In his first two collegiate seasons in 2022 and 2023, Sutton appeared in six games, where he utilized a redshirt, while rushing 32 times for 165 yards. During the 2024 season, he ran just five times for 35 yards. In week one of the 2025 season, Sutton rushed 22 times for 100 yards and two touchdowns in a season opening win over Stony Brook. In week ten, he ran for a career-high 157 yards in a victory against Wyoming. In week twelve, Sutton ran for 150 yards in a victory over Boise State. For his performance during the 2025 season, he was named a semifinalist for the Doak Walker Award.
