= 2025 California Golden Bears football team =

American college football season

2025 California Golden Bears football

Hawaii Bowl, L 31–35 vs. Hawaii
- Conference: Atlantic Coast Conference
- Record: 7–6 (4–4 ACC)
- Head coach: Justin Wilcox (9th season; games 1-11); Nick Rolovich (Interim; remainder of season)
- Offensive coordinator: Bryan Harsin (1st season)
- Offensive scheme: Up-tempo spread
- Co-defensive coordinators: Vic So'oto (1st season); Terrence Brown (1st season)
- Base defense: 4–2–5
- Home stadium: California Memorial Stadium

Uniform

2025 Atlantic Coast Conference football standings
	Conf.			Overall
Team	W		L	W		L
No. 16 Virginia y	7	–	1	11	–	3
Duke y$	6	–	2	9	–	5
No. 2 Miami (FL) ^	6	–	2	13	–	3
Georgia Tech	6	–	2	9	–	4
SMU	6	–	2	9	–	4
Pittsburgh	6	–	2	8	–	5
Louisville	4	–	4	9	–	4
Wake Forest	4	–	4	9	–	4
NC State	4	–	4	8	–	5
California	4	–	4	7	–	6
Clemson	4	–	4	7	–	6
Stanford	3	–	5	4	–	8
Florida State	2	–	6	5	–	7
Virginia Tech	2	–	6	3	–	9
North Carolina	2	–	6	4	–	8
Boston College	1	–	7	2	–	10
Syracuse	1	–	7	3	–	9
Championship: Duke 27, Virginia 20^{OT}
^ – College Football Playoff participant; $ – Conference champion; y – Championship game participant; As of November 11, 2026; Rankings from AP Poll

The 2025 California Golden Bears football team represented the University of California, Berkeley in the Atlantic Coast Conference (ACC) during the 2025 NCAA Division I FBS football season. The Golden Bears were led by Justin Wilcox in his ninth year as the head coach. The Golden Bears played their home games at California Memorial Stadium located in Berkeley, California.

On November 23, Cal announced they were parting ways with head coach Justin Wilcox; Nick Rolovich, a senior offensive assistant, would be elevated to interim head coach. Wilcox accrued a 48–55 record, with five bowl berths, making him the program's sixth-winningest head coach.

On December 4, the program hired Oregon defensive coordinator Tosh Lupoi as their next head coach, the same day they accepted a bid to play in the Hawaii Bowl against Hawaii.

The California Golden Bears drew an average home attendance of 34,991.

== Offseason ==
=== Coaching staff changes ===
==== Additions ====
Name	Position	Prev. team	Prev. position
Bryan Harsin	Offensive Coordinator	Auburn	Head coach
Kyle Cefalo	Wide Receivers Coach	Utah State	Offensive Coordinator/WR Coach
Famika Anae	Offensive Line Coach	New Mexico State	Offensive Line Coach
Julian Griffin	Running Backs Coach	UTSA	Running Backs Coach
Allen Brown	Defensive Backs Coach	Washington State	Cornerbacks Coach
Nick Rolovich	Senior Offensive Assistant	Washington State	Head coach
Keith Heyward	Defensive Backs Coach	Oregon State	Defensive Coordinator
Bob Gregory	Senior Defensive Assistant	Stanford	Special Teams Coordinator

==== Departures ====
Name	Position	New team	New position
Peter Sirmon	Defensive Coordinator	New Orleans Saints	Linebackers coach
Mike Bloesch	Offensive Coordinator	North Texas	Tight end coach/run game coordinator
Aristotle Thompson	Running Backs Coach	Northwestern	Running Backs Coach
Tre Watson	Safeties Coach	TCU	Defensive Passing Game Coordinator

=== Transfers ===
==== Incoming ====
Incoming transfers
Name	Pos.	Height	Weight	Hometown	Prev. school
Tyson Ford	DL	6'5"	275 lbs	St. Louis, MO	Notre Dame
Jaden Mickey	CB	5'11"	176 lbs	Eastvale, CA	Notre Dame
Hezekiah Masses	CB	6'0"	190 lbs	Miami, FL	FIU
LaJuan Owens	OL	6'4"	300 lbs	New Orleans, LA	New Mexico
Lamar Robinson	IOL	6"4"	303 lbs	Alexandria, VA	Georgia State
Tyson Ruffins	OL	6'5"	310 lbs	Las Vegas, NV	Nevada
Tristan Dunn	S	6'5"	205 lbs	Sumner, WA	Washington
Leon Bell	OT	6'8"	330 lbs	Alvin, TX	Mississippi State
Kyle Cunanan	K	5'10"	180 lbs	Charlotte, NC	Charlotte
Jaron-Keawe Sagapolutele	QB	6'3"	217 lbs	ʻEwa Beach, HI	Oregon
Jayden Wayne	EDGE	6'5"	255 lbs	Tacoma, WA	Washington
Jordan Spasojevic-Moko	IOL	6'5"	335 lbs	Brisbane, AUS	Charlotte
Brook Honore	P	6'0"	190 lbs	Manvel, TX	Arkansas State
Mason Mini	TE	6'4"	240 lbs	Pacifica, CA	Idaho
Caleb Johnston	LS	6'1"	223 lbs	Ripon, CA	Washington
Buom Jock	LB	6'5"	235 lbs	Mankato, MN	Colorado State
Jacob De Jesus	WR	5'7"	175 lbs	Manteca, CA	UNLV
Dazmin James	WR	6'2"	190 lbs	Clayton, NC	Arkansas
Dru Polidore Jr.	S	6'2"	195 lbs	Katy, TX	Montana State
Devin Brown	QB	6'3"	212 lbs	Gilbert, AZ	Ohio State
Chris Victor	DE	6'4"	235 lbs	Jacksonville, FL	Chattanooga
Quaron Adams	WR	5'7"	170 lbs	Chandler, AZ	South Dakota
TJ Bush Jr.	DE	6'2"	265 lbs	Buford, GA	Liberty
Rino Monteforte	LS	5'7"	210 lbs	North Babylon, NY	Notre Dame
Brandon High	RB	5'10"	215 lbs	Spring, TX	UTSA
Quimari Shemwell	CB	5"11"	170 lbs	Los Angeles, CA	Utah
Kendrick Raphael	RB	5'11"	195 lbs	Naples, FL	NC State
Daveion Harley	C	6'2"	305 lbs	Havana, FL	Jacksonville State
Mark Hamper	WR	6'2"	210 lbs	West Linn, OR	Wisconsin
Zae Smith	DL	6'1"	310 lbs	League City, TX	Houston Christian
Jordan Sanford	S	6'0"	195 lbs	Arlington, TX	Texas Tech
Harrison Taggart	LB	6'1"	235 lbs	Draper, UT	BYU
Brent Austin	CB	5'11"	180 lbs	San Bernardino, CA	South Florida
LJ Johnson Jr.	RB	5'10"	220 lbs	Cypress, TX	SMU
Abram Murray	K	6"0"	210 lbs	Shreveport, LA	Miami (FL)
Chase Meyer	K	5"10"	180 lbs	Los Angeles, CA	Penn State
Jayden Dixon-Veal	WR	6'0"	190 lbs	Rancho Cucamonga, CA	Purdue
Landon Morris	TE	6'5"	230 lbs	Indianapolis, IN	Temple
Michael Kern	P	6'3"	195 lbs	Fort Lauderdale, FL	Texas
Jordan Franke	LS	5'10"	200 lbs	Verona, WI	South Carolina

==== Outgoing ====
Outgoing transfers
Name	Pos.	Height	Weight	Hometown	New school
Matthew Wykoff	OL	6'6"	325 lbs	Magnolia, TX	Houston
Nate Rutchena	TE	6'3"	230 lbs	Danville, CA	UC Davis
Brooklyn Cheek	S	6'1"	195 lbs	Oakdale, CA	Wyoming
JT Byrne	TE	6'5"	255 lbs	Carmel, CA	Georgia Tech
Bobby Engstler	P	6'0"	200 lbs	Tallahassee, FL	Arkansas State
Nyziah Hunter	WR	6'2"	210 lbs	Salinas, CA	Nebraska
Fernando Mendoza	QB	6'5"	225 lbs	Miami, FL	Indiana
David Bird	LS	6'0"	210 lbs	Phoenix, AZ	Alabama
Josiah Martin	WR	5'11"	170 lbs	Corinth, TX	Oklahoma
Derek Morris	K	6'2"	200 lbs	Dayton, OH	UMass
Mikey Matthews	WR	5'9"	180 lbs	Irvine, CA	UCLA
Matthew Littlejohn	DB	5'11"	195 lbs	San Antonio, TX	TBD
Chandler Rogers	QB	6'0"	200 lbs	Mansfield, TX	TBD
David Reese	LB	6'2"	240 lbs	Fort Pierce, FL	Syracuse
Justin Williams-Thomas	RB	6'0"	205 lbs	Dallas, GA	Marshall
Trent Ramsey	OL	6'5"	305 lbs	Palm Harbor, FL	Appalachian State
Mavin Anderson	WR	6'0"	200 lbs	Mission Viejo, CA	Texas State
Jaydn Ott	RB	6'0"	210 lbs	Chino, CA	Oklahoma
Byron Cardwell	RB	6'0"	215 lbs	San Diego, CA	San Diego State
Mason Starling	WR	6'4"	200 lbs	Tacoma, WA	San Jose State
Dylan Jemtegaard	IOL	6'4"	295 lbs	Yelm, WA	Montana
Elijah Diaz	OLB	6'2"	240 lbs	Corona, CA	TBD
Kadarius Calloway	RB	6'0"	220 lbs	Philadelphia, MS	New Mexico State
Jaivian Thomas	RB	5'10"	190 lbs	Oakland, CA	UCLA
Jack Endries	TE	6'4"	240 lbs	Danville, CA	Texas
Andrew Maushardt	QB	6'3"	200 lbs	Santa Fe Springs, CA	TBD
John Gayer	EDGE	6'4"	240 lbs	Sherman Oaks, CA	Utah State
Simon Mapa	TE	6'4"	255 lbs	San Mateo, CA	New Mexico
Myles Williams	LB	6"3"	240 lbs	Woodland Hills, CA	Nevada
Camden Jones	TE	6'6"	240 lbs	Pasadena, CA	TBD
Ryan Yaites	DB	6'1"	200 lbs	Denton, TX	TCU
Julian Womack	DB	6'2"	200 lbs	Berkeley, CA	TBD
Jonathan Brady	WR	5'10"	180 lbs	Los Angeles, CA	Indiana
Kyle Cunanan	K	5'10"	180 lbs	Charlotte, NC	Nebraska
Caleb Johnston	LS	6'1"	223 lbs	Ripon, CA	Rutgers
Tobias Merriweather	WR	6'5"	195 lbs	West Camas, WA	Utah
Hunter Barth	LB	6'2"	230 lbs	Chandler, AZ	Stanford
Marcus Scott II	CB	6'0"	180 lbs	Houston, TX	Central Arkansas
Tommy Christakos	K	6'4"	205 lbs	Scottsdale, AZ	Arizona State

=== NFL draft ===
2025 NFL draft class
Player	Round	Pick No.	Position	Team	Source
Nohl Williams	3	85	CB	Kansas City Chiefs	
Craig Woodson	4	106	S	New England Patriots	
Teddye Buchanan	4	129	LB	Baltimore Ravens	
Marcus Harris	6	183	CB	Tennessee Titans	

=== Recruiting class ===
College recruiting
Name	Hometown	School	Height	Weight	Commit date
Anthony League; RB	Long Beach, CA	Millikan	6 ft 1 in (1.85 m)	205 lb (93 kg)	May 22, 2024
Anthony League; RB	Recruit ratings: Rivals: 247Sports: On3:				
John Gayer; DE	San Mateo, CA	College of San Mateo	6 ft 4 in (1.93 m)	255 lb (116 kg)	Aug 1, 2025
John Gayer; DE	Recruit ratings: Rivals: 247Sports: On3:				
Kaden Cook; DB	Round Rock, TX	Stony Point	5 ft 11 in (1.80 m)	170 lb (77 kg)	Sep 28, 2023
Kaden Cook; DB	Recruit ratings: Rivals: 247Sports: On3:				
Meyer Swinney; WR	Edina, MN	Edina	6 ft 4 in (1.93 m)	210 lb (95 kg)	Apr 13, 2024
Meyer Swinney; WR	Recruit ratings: Rivals: 247Sports: On3:				
Ben Howard; OL	Lehi, UT	Skyridge	6 ft 3 in (1.91 m)	250 lb (110 kg)	May 20, 2024
Ben Howard; OL	Recruit ratings: Rivals: 247Sports: On3:				
Ikechukwu Okafor; DE	Houston, TX	Alief Hastings	6 ft 3 in (1.91 m)	256 lb (116 kg)	May 22, 2024
Ikechukwu Okafor; DE	Recruit ratings: Rivals: 247Sports: On3:				
Beckham Barney; LB	Mesa, AZ	Mountain View	6 ft 3 in (1.91 m)	205 lb (93 kg)	Aug 6, 2024
Beckham Barney; LB	Recruit ratings: Rivals: 247Sports: On3:				
LeBron Williams; DE	Kahuku, HI	Kahuku	6 ft 2 in (1.88 m)	245 lb (111 kg)	Sep 6, 2024
LeBron Williams; DE	Recruit ratings: Rivals: 247Sports: On3:				
Jae'on Young; ATH	Chatsworth, CA	Sierra Canyon	5 ft 11 in (1.80 m)	155 lb (70 kg)	Oct 6, 2024
Jae'on Young; ATH	Recruit ratings: Rivals: 247Sports: On3:				
Jacob Houseworth; TE	Fortuna, CA	Fortuna Union	6 ft 4 in (1.93 m)	225 lb (102 kg)	Jun 23, 2024
Jacob Houseworth; TE	Recruit ratings: Rivals: 247Sports: On3:				
Mike Klisiewicz; OL	Brentwood, CA	Liberty	6 ft 6 in (1.98 m)	302 lb (137 kg)	Jun 24, 2024
Mike Klisiewicz; OL	Recruit ratings: Rivals: 247Sports: On3:				
Tre' Harrison; ATH	Gardena, CA	Junípero Serra	5 ft 11 in (1.80 m)	165 lb (75 kg)	Jun 28, 2024
Tre' Harrison; ATH	Recruit ratings: Rivals: 247Sports: On3:				
Aiden Manutai; ATH	Kahuku, HI	Kahuku	6 ft 0 in (1.83 m)	195 lb (88 kg)	Dec 7, 2024
Aiden Manutai; ATH	Recruit ratings: Rivals: 247Sports: On3:				
John Tofi Jr. LB	San Francisco, CA	Archbishop Riordan	6 ft 6 in (1.98 m)	195 lb (88 kg)	Sep 26, 2024
John Tofi Jr. LB	Recruit ratings: Rivals: 247Sports: On3:				
Odera Okaka; LB	San Mateo, CA	College of San Mateo	6 ft 4 in (1.93 m)	235 lb (107 kg)	Apr 12, 2024
Odera Okaka; LB	Recruit ratings: Rivals: 247Sports: On3:				
Dominic Ingrassia; QB	San Mateo, CA	College of San Mateo	6 ft 4 in (1.93 m)	215 lb (98 kg)	Jun 1, 2025
Dominic Ingrassia; QB	Recruit ratings: Rivals: 247Sports: On3:				
Justin Hasenhuetl; OL	Rabun Gap, GA	Rabun Gap-Nacoochee	6 ft 5 in (1.96 m)	290 lb (130 kg)	Nov 1, 2025
Justin Hasenhuetl; OL	Recruit ratings: Rivals: 247Sports: On3:				
Simon Mapa; TE	San Mateo, CA	College of San Mateo	6 ft 3 in (1.91 m)	240 lb (110 kg)	Aug 1, 2025
Simon Mapa; TE	Recruit ratings: Rivals: On3:				
Overall recruit ranking: Rivals: 65 247Sports: 69 On3: 56
Note: In many cases, Scout, Rivals, 247Sports, On3, and ESPN may conflict in their listings of height and weight.; In these cases, the average was taken. ESPN grades are on a 100-point scale.; Sources: "2025 Team Ranking". Rivals.com.

== Schedule ==
Date	Time	Opponent	Site	TV	Result	Attendance
August 30	7:30 p.m.	at Oregon State*	Reser Stadium; Corvallis, OR	ESPN	W 34–15	31,630
September 6	3:00 p.m.	Texas Southern*	California Memorial Stadium; Berkeley, CA	ACCNX/ESPN+	W 35–3	35,898
September 13	7:30 p.m.	Minnesota*	California Memorial Stadium; Berkeley, CA	ESPN	W 27–14	38,556
September 20	7:30 p.m.	at San Diego State*	Snapdragon Stadium; San Diego, CA	CBSSN	L 0–34	31,369
September 27	12:30 p.m.	at Boston College	Alumni Stadium; Chestnut Hill, MA	ACCN	W 28–24	44,500
October 4	7:30 p.m.	Duke^{†}	California Memorial Stadium; Berkeley, CA	ESPN	L 21–45	42,240
October 17	7:30 p.m.	North Carolina	California Memorial Stadium; Berkeley, CA	ESPN	W 21–18	33,401
October 24	4:30 p.m.	at Virginia Tech	Lane Stadium; Blacksburg, VA	ESPN	L 34–42 ^{2OT}	53,837
November 1	12:45 p.m.	No. 15 Virginia	California Memorial Stadium; Berkeley, CA	ESPN2	L 21–31	30,893
November 8	4:00 p.m.	at No. 15 Louisville	L&N Federal Credit Union Stadium; Louisville, KY	ESPN2	W 29–26 ^{OT}	51,381
November 22	4:30 p.m.	at Stanford	Stanford Stadium; Stanford, CA (Big Game)	ACCN	L 10–31	50,039
November 29	5:00 p.m.	No. 21 SMU	California Memorial Stadium; Berkeley, CA	ESPN2	W 38–35	28,956
December 24	5:00 p.m.	at Hawaii*	Clarence T. C. Ching Athletics Complex; Honolulu, HI (Hawaii Bowl)	ESPN	L 31–35	15,194
*Non-conference game; ^{†}Homecoming; Rankings from AP Poll (and CFP Rankings, after November 4) - Released prior to game; All times are in Pacific time

== Game summaries ==
=== at Oregon State ===
California Golden Bears (0–0) at Oregon State Beavers (0–0) – Game summary

Quarter	1	2	3	4	Total
Golden Bears	14	3	7	10	34
Beavers	0	3	6	6	15

at Reser Stadium • Corvallis, OR

- Date: August 30
- Game time: 7:30 p.m. PDT
- Game weather: Cloudy
- Game attendance: 31,630
- Referee: Gary Patterson
- TV announcers (ESPN): Dave Flemming (play-by-play), Brock Osweiler (analyst), and Stormy Buonantony (sideline)

Game information

First quarter

- CAL – Mason Mini 19-yard pass from Jaron-Keawe Sagapolutele (Chase Meyer kick), 11:23. Golden Bears 7–0. Drive: 8 plays, 73 yards, 3:37.
- CAL – Trond Grizzell 32-yard pass from Jaron-Keawe Sagapolutele (Chase Meyer kick), 7:56. Golden Bears 14–0. Drive: 6 plays, 66 yards, 2:26.

Second quarter

- ORST – Caleb Ojeda 53-yard field goal, 9:29. Golden Bears 14–3. Drive: 6 plays, 43 yards, 2:56.
- CAL – Abram Murray 49-yard field goal, 0:00. Golden Bears 17–3. Drive: 5 plays, 34 yards, 0:42.

Third quarter

- CAL – Landon Morris 4-yard pass from Jaron-Keawe Sagapolutele (Chase Meyer kick), 11:37. Golden Bears 24–3. Drive: 4 plays, 40 yards, 1:41.
- ORST – Anthony Hankerson 2-yard run (pass failed), 4:16. Golden Bears 24–9. Drive: 11 plays, 84 yards, 7:21.

Fourth quarter

- CAL – Brandon High Jr. 2-yard run (Chase Meyer kick), 12:02. Golden Bears 31–9. Drive: 1 play, 2 yards, 0:06.
- ORST – Maalik Murphy 3-yard run (run failed), 8:16. Golden Bears 31–15. Drive: 10 plays, 78 yards, 4:26.
- CAL – Chase Meyer 23-yard field goal, 0:20. Golden Bears 34–15. Drive: 10 plays, 29 yards, 4:58.

Statistics	CAL	ORST
First downs	15	19
Plays–yards	71–351	62–313
Rushes–yards	32–122	27–65
Passing yards	234	248
Passing: comp–att–int	20-30-0	22–34–1
Turnovers	0	2
Time of possession	30:08	29:52

Team	Category	Player	Statistics
California	Passing	Jaron-Keawe Sagapolutele	20/30, 234 yards, 3 TD
California	Rushing	Brandon High Jr.	10 carries, 41 yards, TD
California	Receiving	Trond Grizzell	5 receptions, 83 yards, TD
Oregon State	Passing	Maalik Murphy	21/33, 244 yards, INT
Oregon State	Rushing	Anthony Hankerson	15 carries, 42 yards, TD
Oregon State	Receiving	Trent Walker	9 receptions, 136 yards

=== vs Texas Southern (FCS) ===
Texas Southern Tigers (FCS) (0–1) at California Golden Bears (1–0) – Game summary

Quarter	1	2	3	4	Total
Tigers (FCS)	0	0	0	3	3
Golden Bears	3	8	14	10	35

at California Memorial Stadium • Berkeley, CA

- Date: September 6
- Game time: 3:00 p.m. PDT
- Game weather: Sunny
- Game attendance: 35,898
- Referee: Riley Johnson
- TV announcers (ACCNX/ESPN+): Chris Sylvester (play-by-play) and Ahman Green (analyst)
- Box score

Game information

First quarter

- CAL – Abram Murray 44-yard field goal, 11:37. Golden Bears 3–0. Drive: 4 plays, 3 yards, 0:47.

Second quarter

- CAL – Jaron-Keawe Sagapolutele 1-yard run (Mason Mini run for two-point conversion), 1:19. Golden Bears 11–0. Drive: 12 plays, 86 yards, 4:54.

Third quarter

- CAL – Kendrick Raphael 1-yard run (Chase Meyer kick), 9:38. Golden Bears 18–0. Drive: 7 plays, 65 yards, 3:15.
- CAL – LJ Johnson Jr. 12-yard run (Chase Meyer kick), 5:27. Golden Bears 25–0. Drive: 6 plays, 32 yards, 2:30.

Fourth quarter

- TSU – Christian Avelar 39-yard field goal, 13:58. Golden Bears 25–3. Drive: 14 plays, 57 yards, 6:23.
- CAL – Chase Meyer 43-yard field goal, 10:18. Golden Bears 28–3. Drive: 8 plays, 38 yards, 3:33.
- CAL – Jayden Dixon-Veal 14-yard pass from Devin Brown (Chase Meyer kick), 3:09. Golden Bears 35–3. Drive: 11 plays, 90 yards, 5:32.

Statistics	TXSO	CAL
First downs	13	22
Plays–yards	58–192	73–467
Rushes–yards	22–52	34–181
Passing yards	140	286
Passing: comp–att–int	20–36–1	28–39–1
Turnovers	1	2
Time of possession	28:22	31:38

Team	Category	Player	Statistics
Texas Southern	Passing	KJ Cooper	19/35, 137 yards, INT
Texas Southern	Rushing	KJ Cooper	7 carries, 30 yards
Texas Southern	Receiving	Jalen Williams	6 receptions, 42 yards
California	Passing	Jaron-Keawe; Sagapolutele	26/37, 259 yards, INT
California	Rushing	Kendrick Raphael	18 carries, 131 yards, TD
California	Receiving	Mark Hamper	5 receptions, 69 yards

=== vs Minnesota ===
Minnesota Golden Gophers (2–0) at California Golden Bears (2–0) – Game summary

Quarter	1	2	3	4	Total
Golden Gophers	0	7	7	0	14
Golden Bears	7	3	7	10	27

at California Memorial Stadium • Berkeley, CA

- Date: September 13
- Game time: 7:30 p.m. PDT
- Game weather: Temperature: 62 °F (17 °C) • Wind: SW at 14 miles per hour (23 km/h) • Weather: Clear
- Game attendance: 38,556
- Referee: Nate Black
- TV announcers (ESPN): Dave Flemming (play-by-play), Brock Osweiler (analyst), and Stormy Buonantony (sideline)
- Box Score

Game information

First quarter

- (2:54) CAL – Jacob De Jesus 3-yard pass from Jaron-Keawe Sagapolutele, Chase Meyer kick (Drive: 7 plays, 62 yards, 2:22; California 7–0.)

Second quarter

- (0:43) MIN – Cam Davis 1-yard run, Brady Denaburg kick (Drive: 16 plays, 69 yards, 6:34; California 7–7)
- (0:00) CAL – Abram Murray 45-yard field goal (Drive: 6 plays, 48 yards, 0:43; California 10–7)

Third quarter

- (4:36) MIN – Jameson Geers 3-yard pass from Drake Lindsey, Brady Denaburg kick (Drive: 9 plays, 64 yards, 5:52; Minnesota 14–10)
- (0:20) CAL – Mason Mini 9-yard pass from Jaron-Keawe Sagapolutele, Chase Meyer kick (Drive: 9 plays, 75 yards, 4:16; California 17–14)

Fourth quarter

- (6:55) CAL – Jordan King 2-yard pass from Jaron-Keawe Sagapolutele, Chase Meyer kick (Drive: 3 plays, 8 yards, 1:07; California 24–14)
- (1:10) CAL - Chase Meyer 38-yard field goal (Drive: 10 plays, 32 yards, 4:30; California 27–14)

Statistics	MINN	CAL
First downs	19	19
Plays–yards	69–335	69–340
Rushes–yards	37–130	24–61
Passing yards	205	279
Passing: comp–att–int	19–32–1	24–39–0
Turnovers	2	0
Time of possession	33:56	23:04

Team	Category	Player	Statistics
Minnesota	Passing	Drake Lindsey	19/32, 205 yards, TD, INT
Minnesota	Rushing	Fame Ijeboi	16 carries, 85 yards
Minnesota	Receiving	Le'Meke Brockington	8 receptions, 106 yards
California	Passing	Jaron-Keawe; Sagapolutele	24/38, 279 yards, 3 TD
California	Rushing	Kendrick Raphael	13 carries, 47 yards
California	Receiving	Trond Grizzell	4 receptions, 60 yards

=== at San Diego State ===
California Golden Bears (3–0) at San Diego State Aztecs (1–1) – Game summary

Quarter	1	2	3	4	Total
Golden Bears	0	0	0	0	0
Aztecs	0	13	14	7	34

at Snapdragon Stadium • San Diego, CA

- Date: September 20
- Game time: 7:30 p.m. PDT
- Game weather: Temperature: 71 °F (22 °C) • Wind: N at 3 miles per hour (4.8 km/h) • Weather: Clear
- Game attendance: 31,369
- Referee: Tim Hedgepeth
- TV announcers (CBSSN): Alex Del Barrio (play-by-play), Randy Cross (analyst) and Lauren Green (sideline)
- Box score

Game information

First quarter

- No scoring plays.

Second quarter

- (11:42) SDSU – Jordan Napier 6-yard pass from Jayden Denegal, Gabriel Plascencia kick (Drive: 3 plays, 80 yards, 1:37; San Diego State 7–0)
- (6:20) SDSU – Gabriel Plascencia 34-yard field goal (Drive: 7 plays, 25 yards, 3:44; San Diego State 10–0)
- (0:00) SDSU – Gabriel Plascencia 41-yard field goal (Drive: 9 plays, 51 yards, 3:49; San Diego State 13–0)

Third quarter

- (11:03) SDSU – Dwayne McDougle 35-yard fumble recovery, Gabriel Plascencia kick (San Diego State 20–0)
- (5:59) SDSU – Chris Johnson 97-yard interception, Gabriel Plascencia kick (San Diego State 27–0)

Fourth quarter

- (9:20) SDSU – Lucky Sutton 3-yard run, Gabriel Plascencia kick (Drive: 12 plays, 76 yards, 6:08; San Diego State 34–0)

Statistics	CAL	SDSU
First downs	17	15
Plays–yards	72–289	51–321
Rushes–yards	31–65	33–132
Passing yards	224	189
Passing: comp–att–int	18–41–2	15–18–0
Turnovers	3	0
Time of possession	29:42	30:18

Team	Category	Player	Statistics
California	Passing	Jaron-Keawe; Sagapolutele	17/38, 208 yards, 2 INT
California	Rushing	LJ Johnson Jr.	10 carries, 39 yards
California	Receiving	Trond Grizzell	4 receptions, 91 yards
San Diego State	Passing	Jayden Denegal	15/18, 189 yards, TD
San Diego State	Rushing	Lucky Sutton	12 carries, 61 yards, TD
San Diego State	Receiving	Jordan Napier	9 receptions, 154 yards, TD

=== at Boston College ===
California Golden Bears (3–1) at Boston College Eagles (1–2) – Game summary

Quarter	1	2	3	4	Total
Golden Bears	7	7	0	14	28
Eagles	14	3	0	7	24

at Alumni Stadium • Chestnut Hill, MA

- Date: September 27
- Game time: 12:30 p.m. PDT
- Game weather: Temperature: 77 °F (25 °C) • Wind: N at 7 miles per hour (11 km/h) • Weather: Sunny
- Game attendance: 44,500
- Referee: Riley Johnson
- TV announcers (ACCN): Chris Cotter (play-by-play), Max Browne (analyst) and Kendra Douglas (sideline)
- Box score

Game information

First quarter

- (8:56) BC – Dylan Lonergan 7-yard run, Luca Lombardo kick (Drive: 12 plays, 84 yards, 5:54; Boston College 7–0)
- (7:47) BC – Turbo Richard 27-yard run, Luca Lombardo kick (Drive: 2 plays, 27 yards, 0:15; Boston College 14–0)
- (1:05) CAL – LJ Johnson Jr. 1-yard run, Chase Meyer kick (Drive: 12 plays, 74 yards, 6:42; Boston College 14–7)

Second quarter

- (3:46) CAL – Jacob De Jesus 5-yard pass from Jaron-Keawe Sagapolutele, Chase Meyer kick (Drive: 14 plays, 84 yards, 9:03; Tied 14–14)
- (0:37) BC – Luca Lombardo 52-yard field goal (Drive: 12 plays, 36 yards, 3:04; Boston College 17–14)

Third quarter

No scoring plays

Fourth quarter

- (13:47) CAL – Kendrick Raphael 2-yard run, Chase Meyer kick (Drive: 1 play, 2 yards, 0:06; California 21–17)
- (13:35) BC – Turbo Richard 71-yard run, Luca Lombardo kick (Drive: 1 play, 71 yards, 0:12; Boston College 24–21)
- (1:30) CAL – Mason Mini 51-yard pass from Jaron-Keawe Sagapolutele, Chase Meyer kick (Drive: 9 plays, 88 yards, 3:18; California 28–24)

Statistics	CAL	BC
First downs	23	20
Plays–yards	71–372	58–375
Rushes–yards	37–118	21–178
Passing yards	254	197
Passing: comp–att–int	22–34–1	21–37–2
Turnovers	1	2
Time of possession	35:15	24:45

Team	Category	Player	Statistics
California	Passing	Jaron-Keawe; Sagapolutele	22/34, 254 yards, 2 TD, INT
California	Rushing	Kendrick Raphael	25 carries, 119 yards, TD
California	Receiving	Trond Grizzell	5 receptions, 78 yards
Boston College	Passing	Dylan Lonergan	21/37, 197 yards, 2 INT
Boston College	Rushing	Turbo Richard	15 carries, 171 yards, 2 TD
Boston College	Receiving	Lewis Bond	7 receptions, 77 yards

=== vs Duke ===
Duke Blue Devils (3–2) at California Golden Bears (4–1) – Game summary

Quarter	1	2	3	4	Total
Blue Devils	7	24	0	14	45
Golden Bears	14	7	0	0	21

at California Memorial Stadium • Berkeley, CA

- Date: October 4
- Game time: 7:30 p.m. PDT
- Game weather: Temperature: 62 °F (17 °C) • Wind: SW at 4 miles per hour (6.4 km/h) • Weather: Clear
- Game attendance: 42,240
- Referee: Darryl DeBerry
- TV announcers (ESPN): Dave Flemming (play-by-play), Brock Osweiler (analyst) and Stormy Buonantony (sideline)
- Box score

Game information

First quarter

- (9:11) CAL - Jordan King 6-yard pass from Jaron-Keawe Sagapolutele, Chase Meyer kick (Drive: 11 plays, 75 yards, 5:49; California 7–0)
- (5:20) CAL - Kendrick Raphael 5-yard run, Chase Meyer kick (Drive: 5 plays, 55 yards, 2:07; California 14–0)
- (2:38) DUKE - Nate Sheppard 12-yard run, Todd Pelino kick (Drive: 8 plays, 77 yards, 2:37; California 14–7)

Second quarter

- (12:17) CAL - Kendrick Raphael 4-yard run, Chase Meyer kick (Drive: 11 plays, 80 yards, 05:17; California 21–7)
- (7:47) DUKE - Anderson Castle 2-yard run, Todd Pelino kick (Drive: 10 plays, 58 yards, 4:20; California 21–14)
- (5:50) DUKE - Que'Sean Brown 26-yard pass from Darian Mensah, Todd Pelino kick (Drive: 3 plays, 62 yards, 1:09; Tied 21–21)
- (1:10) DUKE - Anderson Castle 1-yard run, Todd Pelino kick (Drive: 6 plays, 38 yards, 2:29; Duke 28–21)
- (0:00) DUKE - Todd Pelino 25-yard field goal (Drive: 6 plays, 53 yards, 0:47; Duke 31–21)

Third quarter

- No scoring plays.

Fourth quarter

- (8:22) DUKE - Cooper Barkate 10-yard pass from Darian Mensah, Todd Pelino kick (Drive: 6 plays, 55 yards, 3:59; Duke 38–21)
- (5:50) DUKE - Nate Sheppard 46-yard run, Todd Pelino kick (Drive: 2 plays, 51 yards, 0:55; Duke 45–21)

Statistics	DUKE	CAL
First downs	24	20
Plays–yards	67–443	61–286
Rushes–yards	37–178	29–41
Passing yards	265	245
Passing: comp–att–int	22–30–0	20–32–4
Turnovers	0	4
Time of possession	31:03	28:57

Team	Category	Player	Statistics
Duke	Passing	Darian Mensah	22/30, 265 yards, 2 TD
Duke	Rushing	Nate Sheppard	12 carries, 91 yards, 2 TD
Duke	Receiving	Que'Sean Brown	6 receptions, 104 yards, TD
California	Passing	Jaron-Keawe; Sagapolutele	20/31, 245 yards, TD, 3 INT
California	Rushing	Kendrick Raphael	18 carries, 67 yards, 2 TD
California	Receiving	Trond Grizzell	4 receptions, 56 yards

=== vs North Carolina ===
North Carolina Tar Heels (2–3) at California Golden Bears (4–2) – Game summary

Quarter	1	2	3	4	Total
Tar Heels	7	3	0	8	18
Golden Bears	14	0	7	0	21

at California Memorial Stadium • Berkeley, CA

- Date: October 17
- Game time: 7:30 p.m. PDT
- Game weather: Temperature: 63 °F (17 °C) • Wind: NW at 2 miles per hour (3.2 km/h) • Weather: Clear
- Game attendance: 33,401
- Referee: Jon Noli
- TV announcers (ESPN): Anish Shroff (play-by-play), Andre Ware (analyst) and Paul Carcaterra (sideline)
- Box score

Game information

First quarter

- (12:48) CAL – Jaron-Keawe Sagapolutele 3-yard run, Chase Meyer kick (Drive: 4 plays, 25 yards, 1:50; California 7–0)
- (4:48) UNC – Benjamin Hall 18-yard run, Rece Verhoff kick (Drive: 4 plays, 70 yards, 1:15; Tied 7–7)
- (0:42) CAL – Jacob De Jesus 7-yard pass from Jaron-Keawe Sagapolutele, Chase Meyer kick (Drive: 12 plays, 75 yards, 4:06; California 14–7)

Second quarter

- (6:14) UNC – Rece Verhoff 41-yard field goal (Drive: 11 plays, 45 yards, 5:37; California 14–10)

Third quarter

- (9:22) CAL – Kendrick Raphael 2-yard run, Chase Meyer kick (Drive: 11 plays, 79 yards, 5:33; California 21–10)

Fourth quarter

- (12:14) UNC – Davion Gause 4-yard run, Benjamin Hall pass (Drive: 11 plays, 84 yards, 4:45; California 21–18)

Statistics	UNC	CAL
First downs	18	19
Plays–yards	64–287	71–294
Rushes–yards	29–120	31–80
Passing yards	167	214
Passing: comp–att–int	19–35–0	22–40–0
Turnovers	3	0
Time of possession	31:10	25:50

Team	Category	Player	Statistics
North Carolina	Passing	Gio Lopez	19/35, 167 yards
North Carolina	Rushing	Benjamin Hall	14 carries, 68 yards, TD
North Carolina	Receiving	Kobe Paysour	6 receptions, 101 yards
California	Passing	Jaron-Keawe; Sagapolutele	21/39, 209 yards, TD
California	Rushing	Kendrick Raphael	22 carries, 81 yards, TD
California	Receiving	Jacob De Jesus	13 receptions, 105 yards, TD

=== at Virginia Tech ===
California Golden Bears (5–2) at Virginia Tech Hokies (2–5) – game summary

Quarter	1	2	3	4	OT	2OT	Total
Golden Bears	3	17	0	7	7	0	34
Hokies	10	0	10	7	7	8	42

at Lane Stadium • Blacksburg, VA

- Date: October 24
- Game time: 4:30 p.m. PDT
- Game weather: Temperature: 49 °F (9 °C) • Wind: N at 2 miles per hour (3.2 km/h) • Weather: Clear
- Game attendance: 53,837
- Referee: Tim Hedgepeth
- TV announcers (ESPN): Anish Shroff (play-by-play), Andre Ware (analyst) and Paul Carcaterra (sideline)
- Box score

Game information

First quarter

- (12:04) VT – Ayden Greene 27-yard pass from Kyron Drones, John Love kick (Drive: 4 plays, 47 yards, 1:21; Virginia Tech 7–0)
- (7:27) VT – John Love 46-yard field goal (Drive: 9 plays, 46 yards, 3:39; Virginia Tech 10–0)
- (2:18) CAL – Chase Meyer 38-yard field goal (Drive: 10 plays, 55 yards, 5:09; Virginia Tech 10–3)

Second quarter

- (14:46) CAL – Kendrick Raphael 1-yard run, Chase Meyer kick (Drive: 4 plays, 51 yards, 1:12; Tied 10–10)
- (9:31) CAL – Chase Meyer 34-yard field goal (Drive: 7 plays, 36 yards, 2:50; California 13–10)
- (1:43) CAL – Kendrick Raphael 1-yard run, Chase Meyer kick (Drive: 8 plays, 21 yards, 3:07; California 20–10)

Third quarter

- (8:45) VT – John Love 52-yard field goal (Drive: 13 plays, 40 yards, 6:15; California 20–13)
- (5:06) VT – Takye Heath 44-yard pass from Kyron Drones, John Love kick (Drive: 4 plays, 86 yards, 1:49; Tied 20–20)

Fourth quarter

- (6:57) VT – Kyron Drones 14-yard run, John Love kick (Drive: 9 plays, 64 yards, 5:09; Virginia Tech 27–20)
- (2:34) CAL – Kendrick Raphael 2-yard run, Chase Meyer kick (Drive: 9 plays, 72 yards, 4:31; Tied 27–27)

Overtime

- CAL – Mason Mini 25-yard pass from Jaron-Keawe Sagapolutele, Chase Meyer kick (Drive: 1 play, 25 yards, 0:00; California 34–27)
- VT – Kyron Drones 17-yard run, John Love kick (Drive: 2 plays, 25 yards, 0:00; Tied 34–34)

Double overtime

- VT – Takye Heath 7-yard pass from Kyron Drones, Kyron Drones run (Drive: 5 plays, 25 yards, 0:00; Virginia Tech 42–34)

Statistics	CAL	VT
First downs	19	24
Plays–yards	67–325	76–476
Rushes–yards	27–39	58–357
Passing yards	286	119
Passing: comp–att–int	24–40–0	9–18–1
Turnovers	0	1
Time of possession	27:46	32:14

Team	Category	Player	Statistics
California	Passing	Jaron-Keawe Sagapolutele	24/39, 286 yards, TD
California	Rushing	Kendrick Raphael	20 carries, 71 yards, 3 TD
California	Receiving	Jacob De Jesus	8 receptions, 86 yards
Virginia Tech	Passing	Kyron Drones	9/18, 119 yards, 3 TD, INT
Virginia Tech	Rushing	Marcellous Hawkins	21 carries, 167 yards
Virginia Tech	Receiving	Takye Heath	4 receptions, 64 yards, 2 TD

=== vs No. 15 Virginia ===
No. 15 Virginia Cavaliers (7–1) at California Golden Bears (5–3) – Game summary

Quarter	1	2	3	4	Total
No. 15 Cavaliers	10	7	7	7	31
Golden Bears	0	7	7	7	21

at California Memorial Stadium • Berkeley, CA

- Date: November 1
- Game time: 12:45 p.m. PDT
- Game weather: Temperature: 66 °F (19 °C) • Wind: W at 4 miles per hour (6.4 km/h) • Weather: Sunny
- Game attendance: 30,893
- Referee: Justin Elliott
- TV announcers (ESPN2): Mike Couzens (play-by-play), Kirk Morrison (analyst), and Dawn Davenport (sideline)
- Box score

Game information

First quarter

- (11:58) UVA – J'Mari Taylor 25-yard run, Will Bettridge kick (Drive: 8 plays, 75 yards, 2:58 Virginia 7–0)
- (5:21) UVA – Will Bettridge 26-yard field goal (Drive: 11 plays, 67 yards, 4:10 Virginia 10–0)

Second quarter

- (13:01) CAL – Kendrick Raphael 2-yard run, Chase Meyer kick (Drive: 14 plays, 75 yards, 7:20 Virginia 10–7)
- (5:21) UVA – J'Mari Taylor 5-yard run, Will Bettridge kick (Drive: 14 plays, 75 yards, 7:40 Virginia 17–7)

Third quarter

- (6:08) CAL – Kendrick Raphael 42-yard pass from Mason Mini, Chase Meyer kick (Drive: 1 play, 42 yards, 0:08 Virginia 17–14)
- (1:51) UVA – Eli Wood 3-yard run, Will Bettridge kick (Drive: 11 plays, 75 yards, 4:17 Virginia 24–14)

Fourth quarter

- (12:57) CAL – Kendrick Raphael 1-yard run, Chase Meyer kick (Drive:2 plays, 25 yards, 0:36 Virginia 24–21)
- (0:34) UVA – Kam Robinson 35 yd interception, Will Bettridge kick (Virginia 31–21)

Statistics	UVA	CAL
First downs	23	14
Plays–yards	80–456	57–263
Rushes–yards	44–194	25–8
Passing yards	262	255
Passing: comp–att–int	24–36–0	20–32–2
Turnovers	0	2
Time of possession	35:26	24:34

Team	Category	Player	Statistics
Virginia	Passing	Chandler Morris	24/36, 262 yards
Virginia	Rushing	J'Mari Taylor	21 carries, 105 yards, 2 TD
Virginia	Receiving	Trell Harris	5 catches, 68 yards
California	Passing	Jaron-Keawe; Sagapolutele	19/30, 213 yards, 2 INT
California	Rushing	Kendrick Raphael	13 carries, 46 yards
California	Receiving	Trond Grizzell	8 catches, 80 yards

=== at No. 15 Louisville ===
California Golden Bears (5–4) at No. 15 Louisville Cardinals (7–1) – Game summary

Quarter	1	2	3	4	OT	Total
Golden Bears	7	10	6	0	6	29
No. 15 Cardinals	7	6	7	3	3	26

at L&N Federal Credit Union Stadium • Louisville, KY

- Date: November 8
- Game time: 4:00 p.m. PST
- Game weather: Temperature: 58 °F (14 °C) • Wind: NW at 1 mile per hour (1.6 km/h) • Weather: Cloudy
- Game attendance: 51,381
- Referee: Jon Noli
- TV announcers (ESPN2): Dave Flemming (play-by-play), Brock Osweiler (analyst), and Stormy Buonantony (sideline)
- Box Score

Game information

First quarter

- (5:11) LOU – Duke Watson 1-yard run, Cooper Ranvier kick (Drive: 10 plays, 78 yards, 5:22; Louisville 7–0)
- (0:40) CAL – Landon Morris 20-yard pass from Jaron-Keawe Sagapolutele, Chase Meyer kick (Drive: 6 plays, 74 yards, 2:07; Tied 7–7)

Second quarter

- (11:01) LOU – Cooper Ranvier 30-yard field goal (Drive: 12 plays, 67 yards, 4:35; Louisville 10–7)
- (5:58) CAL – Chase Meyer 27-yard field goal (Drive: 9 plays, 65 yards, 5:03; Tied 10–10)
- (2:34) LOU – Cooper Ranvier 49-yard field goal (Drive: 7 plays, 44 yards, 3:24; Louisville 13–10)
- (0:07) CAL – Kendrick Raphael 2-yard run, Chase Meyer kick, (Drive: 9 plays, 75 yards, 2:27; California 17–13)

Third quarter

- (11:34) CAL – Chase Meyer 45-yard field goal (Drive: 6 plays, 10 yards, 2:32; California 20–13)
- (7:43) LOU – Miller Moss 1-yard run, Cooper Ranvier kick (Drive: 8 plays, 75 yards, 3:51; Tied 20–20)
- (0:23) CAL – Chase Meyer 26-yard field goal (Drive: 13 plays, 67 yards, 7:20; California 23–20)

Fourth quarter

- (11:08) LOU – Cooper Ranvier 39-yard field goal (Drive: 10 plays, 63 yards, 4:08; Tied 23–23)

Overtime

- LOU - Cooper Ranvier 49-yard field goal (Drive: 4 plays, -6 yards; Louisville 26–26)
- CAL - Jacob De Jesus 3-yard pass from Jaron-Keawe Sagapolutele (Drive: 7 plays, 25 yards; California 29–26)

Statistics	CAL	LOU
First downs	21	16
Plays–yards	74–427	69–351
Rushes–yards	24–77	30–148
Passing yards	350	203
Passing: comp–att–int	31–49–0	20–39–1
Turnovers	0	1
Time of possession	29:52	30:08

Team	Category	Player	Statistics
California	Passing	Jaron-Keawe Sagapolutele	30/47, 323 yards, 2 TD
California	Rushing	Kendrick Raphael	19 carries, 83 yards, TD
California	Receiving	Jacob De Jesus	16 receptions, 158 yards, TD
Louisville	Passing	Miller Moss	20/38, 203 yards, INT
Louisville	Rushing	Keyjuan Brown	14 carries, 136 yards
Louisville	Receiving	Caullin Lacy	4 receptions, 60 yards

=== at Stanford (Big Game) ===
California Golden Bears (6–4) at Stanford Cardinal (3–7) – Game summary

Quarter	1	2	3	4	Total
Golden Bears	3	7	0	0	10
Cardinal	0	14	3	14	31

at Stanford Stadium • Stanford, CA

- Date: November 22
- Game time: 4:30 p.m. PST
- Game weather: Sunny
- Game attendance: 50,039
- Referee: Nate Black
- TV announcers (ACCN): Chris Cotter (play-by-play), Max Browne (analyst) and Kendra Douglas (sideline)
- Box score

Game information

First quarter

- (6:10) CAL – Abram Murray 40-yard field goal (Drive: 11 plays, 56 yards, 5:46; California 3–0)

Second quarter

- (12:57) STA – Jay Green 49-yard fumble recovery, Emmet Kenney kick (Stanford 7–3)
- (4:38) CAL – Jaron-Keawe Sagapolutele 7-yard run, Chase Meyer kick (Drive: 15 plays, 75 yards, 8:19; California 10–7)
- (0:58) STA – Darrius Davis 17-yard fumble recovery, Emmet Kenney kick (Stanford 14–10)

Third quarter

- (2:19) STA – Emmet Kenney 36-yard field goal (Drive: 7 plays, 31 yards, 3:34; Stanford 17–10)

Fourth quarter

- (14:56) STA – Micah Ford 4-yard run, Emmet Kenney kick (Drive: 4 plays, 20 yards, 1:35; Stanford 24–10)
- (10:01) STA – CJ Williams 34-yard pass from Elijah Brown, Emmet Kenney kick (Drive: 5 plays, 58 yards, 3:26; Stanford 31–10)

Statistics	CAL	STAN
First downs	15	17
Total yards	297	282
Rushes–yards	26–12	37–159
Passing yards	285	123
Passing: comp–att–int	34–50–0	10–20–0
Turnovers	3	0
Time of possession	33:40	26:20

Team	Category	Player	Statistics
California	Passing	Jaron-Keawe Sagapolutele	33/49, 269 yards
California	Rushing	Kendrick Raphael	15 carries, 47 yards
California	Receiving	Trond Grizzell	9 receptions, 104 yards
Stanford	Passing	Elijah Brown	10/20, 123 yards, TD
Stanford	Rushing	Micah Ford	29 carries, 150 yards, TD
Stanford	Receiving	CJ Williams	5 receptions, 76 yards, TD

=== vs No. 21 SMU ===
No. 21 SMU Mustangs (8–3) at California Golden Bears (6–5) – Game summary

Quarter	1	2	3	4	Total
No. 21 Mustangs	7	0	7	21	35
Golden Bears	3	14	7	14	38

at California Memorial Stadium • Berkeley, CA

- Date: November 29
- Game time: 5:00 p.m. PST
- Game weather: Temperature: 50 °F (10 °C) • Wind: NE at 9 miles per hour (14 km/h) • Weather: Clear
- Game attendance: 28,956
- Referee: Tim Hedgepeth
- TV announcers (ESPN2): Lowell Galindo (play-by-play), Aaron Murray (analyst), and Lauren Sisler (sideline)
- Box score

Game information

First quarter

- (3:23) CAL – Chase Meyer 40-yard field goal (Drive: 15 plays, 60 yards, 6:17; California 3–0)
- (1:37) SMU – Chris Johnson Jr. 54-yard run, Sam Keltner kick (Drive: 4 plays, 80 yards, 1:40 SMU 7–3)

Second quarter

- (13:33) CAL – Jaiven Plummer 35-yard pass from Jaron-Keawe Sagapolutele, Chase Meyer kick (Drive: 7 plays, 82 yards, 2:58; California 10–7)
- (10:29) CAL – Jacob De Jesus 7-yard pass from Jaron-Keawe Sagapolutele, Chase Meyer kick (Drive: 5 plays, 17 yards, 2:43; California 17–7)

Third quarter

- (8:25) CAL – Cole Boscia 15-yard pass from Jaron-Keawe Sagapolutele, Chase Meyer kick (Drive: 11 plays, 75 yards, 5:04; California 24–7)
- (4:52) SMU – Matthew Hibner 6-yard pass from Kevin Jennings, Sam Keltner kick (Drive: 9 plays, 75 yards, 3:33; California 24–14)

Fourth quarter

- (14:54) CAL – Quaron Adams 32-yard pass from Jaron-Keawe Sagapolutele, Chase Meyer kick (Drive: 9 plays, 75 yards, 4:58; California 31–14)
- (12:58) SMU – Kevin Jennings 3-yard run, Sam Keltner kick (Drive: 7 plays, 75 yards, 1:56; California 31–21)
- (7:59) SMU – Jordan Hudson 20-yard pass from Kevin Jennings, Sam Keltner kick (Drive: 11 plays, 71 yards, 3:27; California 31–28)
- (2:22) SMU – T.J. Harden 1-yard run, Sam Keltner kick (Drive: 5 plays, 73 yards, 2:24; SMU 35–31)
- (0:43) CAL – Kendrick Raphael 2-yard run, Chase Meyer kick (Drive: 7 plays, 75 yards, 1:39; California 38–35)

Statistics	SMU	CAL
First downs	23	27
Plays–yards	67–477	77–452
Rushes–yards	31–227	37–122
Passing yards	250	330
Passing: comp–att–int	24–36–1	31–40–0
Turnovers	1	0
Time of possession	23:04	36:56

Team	Category	Player	Statistics
SMU	Passing	Kevin Jennings	24/36, 250 yards, 2 TD, INT
SMU	Rushing	Chris Johnson Jr.	10 carries, 128 yards, TD
SMU	Receiving	Matthew Hibner	5 receptions, 87 yards, TD
California	Passing	Jaron-Keawe Sagapolutele	31/40, 330 yards, 4 TD
California	Rushing	Kendrick Raphael	33 carries, 111 yards, TD
California	Receiving	Jacob De Jesus	12 receptions, 97 yards, TD

=== at Hawaii (Hawaii Bowl) ===
2025 Sheraton Hawaii Bowl
California Golden Bears (7–5) at Hawaii Rainbow Warriors (8–4)

Quarter	1	2	3	4	Total
California	7	14	0	10	31
Hawaii	0	10	3	22	35

at Clarence T.C. Ching Athletics Complex • Honolulu, HI

- Date: December 24
- Game time: 5:00 p.m. PST
- Game weather: Patchy rain nearby • Temperature: 78 °F (26 °C) • Wind: ENE at 19 miles per hour (31 km/h)
- Game attendance: 15,194
- Referee: Chris LaMange
- TV announcers (ESPN): Chris Cotter (play-by-play), Max Browne (analyst) and Harry Lyles Jr. (sideline)
- Box score

Game information

First quarter

- (7:01) CAL – Jacob De Jesus 41-yard pass from Jaron-Keawe Sagapolutele, Chase Meyer kick (Drive: 8 plays, 87 yards, 4:11; California 7–0)

Second quarter

- (14:55) CAL – Kendrick Raphael 19-yard run, Chase Meyer kick (Drive: 8 plays, 68 yards, 3:02; California 14–0)
- (9:38) CAL – Anthony League 8-yard run, Chase Meyer kick (Drive: 8 plays, 49 yards, 3:13; California 21–0)
- (3:57) HAW – Pofele Ashlock 13-yard pass from Micah Alejado, Kansei Matsuzawa kick (Drive: 12 plays, 75 yards, 5:41; California 21–7)
- (0:27) HAW – Kansei Matsuzawa 29-yard field goal (Drive: 7 plays, 21 yards, 1:18; California 21–10)

Third quarter

- (5:58) HAW – Kansei Matsuzawa 39-yard field goal (Drive: 13 plays, 61 yards, 6:20; California 21–13)

Fourth quarter

- (13:50) HAW – Pofele Ashlock 3-yard pass from Micah Alejado, Cam Barfield pass (Drive: 8 plays, 53 yards, 3:41; Tied 21–21)
- (8:56) CAL – Chase Meyer 22-yard field goal (Drive: 10 plays, 71 yards, 4:54; California 24–21)
- (7:19) HAW – Brandon White 17-yard pass from Micah Alejado, Kansei Matsuzawa kick (Drive: 4 plays, 59 yards, 1:27; Hawaii 28–24)
- (1:57) CAL – Jaron-Keawe Sagapolutele 1-yard run, Chase Meyer kick (Drive: 9 plays, 75 yards, 5:22; California 31–28)
- (0:10) HAW – Nick Cenacle 22-yard pass from Luke Weaver, Kansei Matsuzawa kick (Drive: 10 plays, 68 yards, 1:42; Hawaii 35–31)

Statistics	CAL	HAW
First downs	29	24
Total yards	67–481	72–395
Rushing yards	28–144	23–93
Passing yards	337	302
Passing: Comp–Att–Int	28–39–0	34–49–0
Turnovers	1	0
Time of possession	29:40	30:20

Team	Category	Player	Statistics
California	Passing	Jaron-Keawe Sagapolutele	28/39, 343 yards, TD
California	Rushing	Kendrick Raphael	18 carries, 91 yards, TD
California	Receiving	Jacob De Jesus	9 receptions, 137 yards, TD
Hawaii	Passing	Micah Alejado	32/46, 274 yards, 3 TD
Hawaii	Rushing	Landon Sims	9 carries, 36 yards
Hawaii	Receiving	Pofele Ashlock	14 carries, 123 yards, 2 TD

== Awards and honors ==
=== Player of the week honors ===
Weekly awards
Player	Award	Week awarded	Ref.
Jaron-Keawe Sagapolutele	ACC Rookie of the Week	Week 1	
Jaron-Keawe Sagapolutele	Shaun Alexander Freshman Player of the Week	Week 1	
Jaron-Keawe Sagapolutele	ACC Rookie of the Week	Week 3	
Cade Uluave	ACC Linebacker of the Week	Week 9	
Jaron-Keawe Sagapolutele	ACC Rookie of the Week	Week 11	
Jaron-Keawe Sagapolutele	ACC Quarterback of the Week	Week 11	
Jacob De Jesus	ACC Receiver of the Week	Week 11	
Hezekiah Masses	ACC Defensive Back of the Week	Week 11	
Jaron-Keawe Sagapolutele	ACC Rookie of the Week	Week 14	
Jaron-Keawe Sagapolutele	ACC Quarterback of the Week	Week 14	
Kendrick Raphael	ACC Running Back of the Week	Week 14	

=== All-conference teams ===
All-ACC Football Team
Player	Award	Position	Ref.
Jacob De Jesus	First team	All purpose	
Jacob De Jesus	First team	Return specialist	
Cade Uluave	First team	LB	
Hezekiah Masses	First team	CB	
Jacob De Jesus	Second team	WR	
Brent Austin	Third team	CB	
Kendrick Raphael	Honorable mention	RB	
Aidan Keanaaina	Honorable mention	DT	
Luke Ferrelli	Honorable mention	LB	

=== Individual awards ===
ACC individual awards
Player	Award	Ref.
Luke Ferrelli	Defensive Rookie of the Year	

All-Americans
Player	Selector	Award	Ref.
Hezekiah Masses	AP	Second Team	
Hezekiah Masses	AFCA	Second Team	
Hezekiah Masses	FWAA	Second Team	
Hezekiah Masses	WCFF	Second Team	

== Roster ==
2025 California Golden Bears football team roster
Players
Coaches
Offense

Pos.	#	Name	Class
QB	2	EJ Caminong	Fr
QB	3	Jaron-Keawe Sagapolutele	Fr
WR	4	Jordan King	Jr
RB	5	Brandon High Jr.	So
RB	6	Kendrick Raphael	Jr
WR	7	Trond Grizzell	Sr
WR	8	Daz James	So
WR	9	Kyion Grayes	So
WR	10	Jayden Dixon-Veal	Sr
RB	11	LJ Johnson Jr.	Sr
QB	13	Devin Brown	Jr
QB	14	Dominic Ingrassia	So
WR	15	Mark Hamper	So
QB	17	Alonzo Esparza	Fr
WR	18	QuaRon Adams	Jr
WR	19	Trevor Rogers	Fr
QB	20	Belay Brummel	So
WR	21	Jacob De Jesus	Sr
WR	22	Carson Perry-Smith	Fr
RB	24	Jayden Parker	Fr
RB	25	Anthony League	Fr
WR	26	Isaac Torres	Sr
RB	28	Jamaal Wiley	Fr
RB	33	Dean-Taylor Chapman	So
OL	50	LaJuan Owens	So
OL	52	Nick Morrow	So
OL	54	Frederick Williams III	So
OL	55	Leon Bell	Jr
OL	56	Tyson Ruffins	So
OL	57	Daveion Harley	So
OL	59	Akili Calhoun	Sr
OL	62	Syris Corley	Fr
OL	66	Jordan Spasojevic-Moko	Sr
OL	68	Jojo Genova	Fr
OL	69	Aiden Newbill	Fr
OL	70	Sam Bjerke	Fr
OL	71	Sioape Vatikani	Jr
OL	72	Ben Howard	Fr
OL	73	Tyler Knape	Fr
OL	74	Michael Klisiewicz	Fr
OL	75	Justin Hasenhuetl	Fr
OL	76	Bastian Swinney	Jr
OL	77	Braden Miller	Jr
OL	78	Lamar Robinson	Sr
TE	80	Jake Houseworth	Fr
TE	81	Landon Morris	Sr
WR	82	Cole Boscia	Jr
WR	83	Myles Reber	So
WR	84	Jaiven Plummer	So
TE	85	Mason Mini	So
TE	86	Jeffrey Johnson	Sr
WR	88	Meyer Swinney	Fr
TE	89	Ben Marshall	So
TE	90	Jack Olyphant	Fr

Defense

Pos.	#	Name	Class
ILB	0	Cade Uluave	Jr
DB	2	Dru Polidore Jr.	Sr
OLB	3	TJ Bush Jr.	Jr
DB	4	Brent Austin	Sr
DB	5	Hezekiah Masses	Sr
DB	6	Ja'ir Smith	Sr
ILB	7	Harrison Taggart	Jr
DB	8	Jasiah Wagoner	So
OLB	10	Jayden Wayne	Jr
DB	11	Dayday Aupiu	Fr
ILB	13	Buom Jock	Jr
DB	14	Aiden Manutai	Fr
DB	15	Kaden Cook	Fr
OLB	16	Chris Victor	Sr
DB	17	Jordan Sanford	Jr
OLB	18	Serigne Tounkara	So
OLB	19	Odera Okaka	Jr
DB	20	Cam Sidney	Jr
DB	21	Jae'on Young	Fr
DB	22	Tristan Dunn	Jr
DB	23	Isaiah Crosby	Jr
DB	24	Quimari Shemwell	So
DB	25	Khamani Hudson	Fr
DB	28	Tre' Harrison	Fr
DB	30	Mayze Bryant	Jr
DB	34	Tobey Weydemuller	Fr
OLB	36	Jude McLellan	So
DB	38	Nate Escalada	So
OLB	39	Michael Cooley	So
ILB	41	Luke Ferrelli	Fr
OLB	43	Ryan McCulloch	Jr
OLB	44	John Tofi Jr.	Fr
ILB	45	Beckham Barney	Fr
ILB	46	Aaron Hampton	So
DL	47	Aidan Keanaaina	Sr
ILB	49	Lucas Vanderlind	So
OLB	51	Curlee Thomas IV	Jr
ILB	53	Eze Osondu	Fr
DL	55	BJ Canady	Fr
DL	56	Legend Journey	Fr
ILB	57	B. J. Jones	So
DL	88	T. J. Bollers	Sr
DL	91	Ike Okafor	Fr
DL	92	LeBron Williams	Fr
DL	93	R. J. Stephens	So
DL	94	Stanley Saole-McKenzie	Sr
DL	95	Tyson Ford	So
DL	96	Derek Wilkins	Jr
DL	97	Michael-Anthony Okwura	Fr
DL	98	Nate Burrell	Sr
DL	99	Zae Smith	Sr

Special teams

Pos.	#	Name	Class
P	9	Michael Kern	So
K	27	Abram Murray	Fr
LS	31	Jordan Franke	So
K, P	37	Erik Peters	Fr
LS	39	Rino Monteforte	Jr
P	40	Brook Honoré Jr.	Jr
LS	48	Ewan Arechaederra	So
K	91	Chase Meyer	Jr

Head coach

- Justin Wilcox

Coordinators/assistant coaches

- Bryan Harsin – Offensive coordinator/quarterbacks
- Terrence Brown – Co-defensive coordinator/defensive backs
- Vic So'oto – Co-defensive coordinator/special teams coordinator
- Famika Anae – Offensive lineman
- Allen Brown – Defensive backs
- Andrew Browning – Defensive linemen/run game coordinator
- Michael Bruno – Inside linebackers
- Kyle Cefalo – Wide receivers/passing game coordinator
- Julian Griffin – Running backs
- Keith Heyward – Defensive backs
- Mike Saffell – Tight ends
- Jason Novak – Director, athletic performance

Legend

- (C) Team captain
- (S) Suspended
- (I) Ineligible
- Injured
- Redshirt

Roster
Last update: 8/8/25
