= 2025 Hawaii Rainbow Warriors football team =

American college football season

2025 Hawaii Rainbow Warriors football

Hawaii Bowl champion

Hawaii Bowl, W 35–31 vs. California
- Conference: Mountain West Conference
- Record: 9–4 (5–3 MW)
- Head coach: Timmy Chang (4th season)
- Offensive coordinator: Anthony Arceneaux (1st season)
- Offensive scheme: Run and shoot
- Defensive coordinator: Dennis Thurman (2nd season)
- Base defense: 4–2–5
- Home stadium: Clarence T. C. Ching Athletics Complex

2025 Mountain West Conference football standings
	Conf.			Overall
Team	W		L	W		L
Boise State y$	6	–	2	9	–	5
UNLV y	6	–	2	10	–	4
San Diego State	6	–	2	9	–	4
New Mexico	6	–	2	9	–	4
Fresno State	5	–	3	9	–	4
Hawaii	5	–	3	9	–	4
Utah State	4	–	4	6	–	7
Air Force	3	–	5	4	–	8
Nevada	2	–	6	3	–	9
Wyoming	2	–	6	4	–	8
San Jose State	2	–	6	3	–	9
Colorado State	1	–	7	2	–	10
Championship: Boise State 38, UNLV 21
$ – Conference champion; y – Championship game participant; Rankings from CFP Rankings

The 2025 Hawaii Rainbow Warriors football team represented the University of Hawaiʻi at Mānoa (Hawaiʻi or UH) in the Mountain West Conference (MW) during the 2025 NCAA Division I FBS football season. The Rainbow Warriors were led by Timmy Chang in his fourth year as the program's head coach. The Rainbow Warriors played home games at the Clarence T. C. Ching Athletics Complex, located in Honolulu, Hawaii.

After a win over Colorado State on October 18, the Rainbow Warriors became bowl eligible for the first time since 2019. The team was bowl eligible in 2020 and 2021 only due to COVID-19-related eligibility reasons. After a win at home over San Diego State on November 8, the Rainbow Warriors secured their first winning season since 2020.

Hawaiʻi had been a single-sport MW member since 2012, and the 2025 season was its last as such. UH will become a full MW member in July 2026.

The Rainbow Warriors drew an average home attendance of 13,708, the highest average since they moved to the Ching Complex in 2021 on a temporary basis.

== Offseason ==
=== Transfers ===
==== Outgoing ====
Player	Position	Destination
Ka'ena DeCambra	OL	Arizona
Hunter Higham	LS	Boise State
Dion Washington	DL	Boise State
Derek Boyd	LB	Delaware State
Alex Perry	WR	FIU
Jake Farrell	QB	Missouri S&T
Patrick Hisatake	DL	Northeastern State
Israel Solomon	CB	Ole Miss
John-Keawe Sagapolutele	QB	Portland State
Maclane Watkins	WR	San Diego
Malachi Finau	DL	San Diego State
Tylan Hines	RB	Tarleton State
Jordon Crawford	DL	Maine
Koali Nishigaya	WR	Unknown
Ismail Ganley	OL	Unknown
Ezra Evaimalo	DE	Unknown
Armando Lewis	WR	Unknown
Brandon Shah	DB	Unknown
Dekel Crowdus	WR	Withdrawn; later re-entered, now at Wisconsin
Nick Cenacle	WR	Withdrawn

==== Incoming ====
Player	Position	Previous school
Max Ware	WR	Arizona State
Tim Malo	S	Brown
Brandon White	WR	Kentucky
Luther McCoy	DL	Minnesota
De'jon Benton	DL	New Mexico
Qwyn Williams	DL	Ohio Dominican
Jackson Harris	WR	Stanford
Caleb Sempebwa	PK	TCU; retired following spring practices
Jax Thompson	LS	TCU; retired following spring practices
Ka'eo Akana	EDGE	Utah
Kainoa Carvalho	WR	Utah (flipped commitment after returning from LDS mission)
Jack Mowrey	LS	James Madison

== Preseason ==
=== Mountain West media poll ===
The Mountain West's preseason prediction poll was released on July 16, 2025.

Mountain West media poll
Predicted finish	Team	Votes (1st place)
1	Boise State	464 (35)
2	UNLV	415 (4)
3	San Jose State	359
4	Colorado State	326
5	Fresno State	301
6	Air Force	280
7	Hawaii	213
8	San Diego State	202
9	Utah State	165
10	Wyoming	150
11	New Mexico	84
12	Nevada	83

== Schedule ==
On August 11, it was announced that for the first time ever, all home games not nationally televised would be aired live on Spectrum Sports in the state of Hawaii. Elsewhere in the United States, these games will air on the Mountain West Network app.

Previously, all home games were shown on a tape-delay or by purchasing pay-per-view.

Date	Time	Opponent	Site	TV	Result	Attendance
August 23	1:30 p.m.	Stanford*	Clarence T. C. Ching Athletics Complex; Honolulu, HI	CBS	W 23–20	15,194
August 30	4:30 p.m.	at Arizona*	Arizona Stadium; Tucson, AZ	TNT	L 6–40	42,423
September 6	6:00 p.m.	Sam Houston*	Clarence T. C. Ching Athletics Complex; Honolulu, HI	Spectrum Sports	W 37–20	11,625
September 13	6:00 p.m.	Portland State*^{†}	Clarence T. C. Ching Athletics Complex; Honolulu, HI	Spectrum Sports	W 23–3	11,936
September 20	6:00 p.m.	Fresno State	Clarence T. C. Ching Athletics Complex; Honolulu, HI (rivalry)	Spectrum Sports	L 21–23	13,789
September 27	10:00 a.m.	at Air Force	Falcon Stadium; Colorado Springs, CO (rivalry)	FS1	W 44–35	22,677
October 11	6:00 p.m.	Utah State	Clarence T. C. Ching Athletics Complex; Honolulu, HI	Spectrum Sports	W 44–26	13,023
October 18	1:00 p.m.	at Colorado State	Canvas Stadium; Fort Collins, CO	Spectrum Sports	W 31–19	40,416
November 1	4:30 p.m.	at San Jose State	CEFCU Stadium; San Jose, CA (Dick Tomey Legacy Game)	CBSSN	L 38–45	16,012
November 8	6:00 p.m.	San Diego State	Clarence T. C. Ching Athletics Complex; Honolulu, HI	Spectrum Sports	W 38–6	15,194
November 21	4:30 p.m.	at UNLV	Allegiant Stadium; Paradise, NV	FS1	L 10–38	37,106
November 29	6:00 p.m.	Wyoming	Clarence T. C. Ching Athletics Complex; Honolulu, HI (rivalry)	Spectrum Sports	W 27–7	15,194
December 24	3:00 p.m.	California*	Clarence T. C. Ching Athletics Complex; Honolulu, HI (Hawaii Bowl)	ESPN	W 35–31	15,194
*Non-conference game; ^{†}Homecoming; All times are in Hawaii time

== Game summaries ==
=== Stanford ===
Stanford Cardinal (0–0) at Hawaii Rainbow Warriors (0–0) – Game summary

Quarter	1	2	3	4	Total
Cardinal	10	3	0	7	20
Rainbow Warriors	7	7	3	6	23

at Clarence T. C. Ching Athletics Complex • Honolulu, Hawaii

- Date: August 23, 2025
- Game time: 1:30 p.m. HST
- Game weather: Sunny and breezy, 89 °F (32 °C)
- Game attendance: 15,194
- Referee: Justin Elliott
- TV announcers (CBS): Rich Waltz (play-by-play), Logan Ryan (color) and Tiffany Blackmon (sideline)

Game information

First quarter

- STAN – Emmet Kenney 23-yard field goal, 7:14. Cardinal 3–0. Drive: 15 plays, 70 yards, 7:46.
- STAN – Wilfredo Aybar fumble recovery in end zone (Emmet Kenney kick), 7:08. Cardinal 10–0.
- HAW – Pofele Ashlock 3-yard pass from Micah Alejado (Kansei Matsuzawa kick), 2:19. Cardinal 10–7. Drive: 6 plays, 58 yards, 2:22.

Second quarter

- STAN – Emmet Kenney 46-yard field goal, 3:39. Cardinal 13–7. Drive: 10 plays, 37 yards, 4:58.
- HAW – Jackson Harris 19-yard pass from Micah Alejado (Kansei Matsuzawa kick), 0:42. Rainbow Warriors 14–13. Drive: 9 plays, 75 yards, 2:57.

Third quarter

- HAW – Kansei Matsuzawa 40-yard field goal, 6:25. Rainbow Warriors 17–13. Drive: 11 plays, 36 yards, 4:18.

Fourth quarter

- STAN – Micah Ford 2-yard run (Emmet Kenney kick), 9:41. Cardinal 20–17. Drive: 20 plays, 85 yards, 9:37.
- HAW – Kansei Matsuzawa 37-yard field goal, 2:01. Tied 20–20. Drive: 10 plays, 50 yards, 3:57.
- HAW – Kansei Matsuzawa 38-yard field goal, 0:00. Rainbow Warriors 23–20. Drive: 9 plays, 52 yards, 1:33.

Statistics	STAN	HAW
First downs	21	20
Total yards	286	306
Rushes–yards	43–177	24–96
Passing yards	109	210
Passing: comp–att–int	15–30–1	27–40–0
Turnovers	1	0
Time of possession	36:07	23:53

Team	Category	Player	Statistics
Stanford	Passing	Ben Gulbranson	15/30, 109 yards, INT
Stanford	Rushing	Micah Ford	26 carries, 113 yards, TD
Stanford	Receiving	Chico Holt	1 reception, 36 yards
Hawaii	Passing	Micah Alejado	27/39, 210 yards, 2 TD
Hawaii	Rushing	Cam Barfield	6 carries, 45 yards
Hawaii	Receiving	Pofele Ashlock	9 receptions, 69 yards, TD

=== at Arizona ===
Hawaii Rainbow Warriors (1–0) at Arizona Wildcats (0–0) – Game summary

Quarter	1	2	3	4	Total
Rainbow Warriors	3	3	0	0	6
Wildcats	7	10	14	9	40

at Arizona Stadium • Tucson, AZ

- Date: August 30, 2025
- Game time: 4:30 p.m. HST
- Game weather: Clear, 94 °F (34 °C)
- Game attendance: 42,423
- Referee: Stephen Baron
- TV announcers (TNT): J.B. Long (play-by-play), Mike Golic Jr. (analyst), and Allie LaForce (sideline reporter)

Game information

First quarter

- (12:11) ARIZ – Kedrick Reescano 13-yard run, Michael Salgado-Medina kick (Drive: 4 plays, 47 yards, 1:21; Arizona 7–0)
- (4:48) HAW – Kansei Matsuzawa 34-yard field goal (Drive: 15 plays, 59 yards, 7:23; Arizona 7–3)

Second quarter

- (12:26) ARIZ – Quincy Craig 54-yard run, Michael Salgado-Medina kick (Drive: 2 plays, 55 yards, 0:33; Arizona 14–3)
- (4:31) ARIZ – Michael Salgado-Medina 35-yard field goal (Drive: 10 plays, 52 yards, 4:31; Arizona 17–3)
- (0:00) HAW – Kansei Matsuzawa 41-yard field goal (Drive: 10 plays, 52 yards, 4:31; Arizona 17–6)

Third quarter

- (12:51) ARIZ – Sam Olson 5-yard pass from Noah Fifita, Michael Salgado-Medina kick (Drive: 6 plays, 65 yards, 2:09; Arizona 24–6)
- (6:46) ARIZ – Noah Fifita 10-yard run, Michael Salgado-Medina kick (Drive: 2 plays, 10 yards, 0:47; Arizona 31–6)

Fourth quarter

- (13:14) ARIZ – Michael Salgado-Medina 52-yard field goal (Drive: 4 plays, -10 yards, 2:10; Arizona 34–6)
- (4:29) ARIZ – Ismail Mahdi 5-yard run, two-point pass failed (Drive: 8 plays, 72 yards, 3:50; Arizona 40–6)

Statistics	HAW	ARIZ
First downs	21	16
Plays–Total yards	76–290	56–344
Rushes–yards	29–67	33–183
Passing yards	223	161
Passing: Comp–Att–Int	26–47–3	13–23–0
Turnovers	5	0
Time of possession	35:44	24:16

Team	Category	Player	Statistics
Hawaii	Passing	Micah Alejado	18/31, 157 yards, INT
Hawaii	Rushing	Landon Sims	9 carries, 41 yards
Hawaii	Receiving	Landon Sims	3 receptions, 48 yards
Arizona	Passing	Noah Fifita	13/23, 161 yards, TD
Arizona	Rushing	Quincy Craig	7 carries, 125 yards, TD
Arizona	Receiving	Brandon Phelps	2 receptions, 50 yards

=== Sam Houston ===
Sam Houston Bearkats (0–2) at Hawaii Rainbow Warriors (1–1) – Game summary

Quarter	1	2	3	4	Total
Bearkats	3	3	7	7	20
Rainbow Warriors	7	10	3	17	37

at Clarence T.C. Ching Athletics Complex • Honolulu, HI

- Date: September 6, 2025
- Game time: 6:00 p.m. HST
- Game weather: Sunny and breezy, 82 °F (28 °C)
- Game attendance: 11,625
- Referee: Kenneth Ray
- TV announcers (Spectrum Sports): Kanoa Leahey (play-by-play) and Rich Miano (color)

Game information

First quarter

- (10:46) HAW – Landon Sims 1-yard pass from Luke Weaver, Kansei Matsuzawa kick (Drive: 8 plays, 78 yards, 2:51; Hawaii 7–0)
- (4:48) SHSU – RJ Lopez 28-yard field goal (Drive: 8 plays, 47 yards, 3:17; Hawaii 7–3)

Second quarter

- (5:45) HAW – Giovanni Iovino 41-yard interception return, Kansei Matsuzawa kick (Hawaii 14–3)
- (1:57) SHSU – RJ Lopez 29-yard field goal (Drive: 9 plays, 64 yards, 3:48; Hawaii 14–6)
- (0:00) HAW – Kansei Matsuzawa 38-yard field goal (Drive: 10 plays, 55 yards, 1:57; Hawaii 17–6)

Third quarter

- (10:13) HAW – Kansei Matsuzawa 43-yard field goal (Drive: 12 plays, 50 yards, 4:44; Hawaii 20–6)
- (3:18) SHSU – Emon Allen 66-yard interception return, RJ Lopez kick (Hawaii 20–13)

Fourth quarter

- (13:37) HAW – Pofele Ashlock 6-yard pass from Luke Weaver, Kansei Matsuzawa kick (Drive: 9 plays, 76 yards, 4:35; Hawaii 27–13)
- (8:15) SHSU – Elijah Green 21-yard pass from Landyn Locke, RJ Lopez kick (Drive: 10 plays, 90 yards, 5:16; Hawaii 27–20)
- (3:01) HAW – Kansei Matsuzawa 19-yard field goal (Drive: 10 plays, 58 yards, 5:07; Hawaii 30–20)
- (1:47) HAW – Pofele Ashlock 15-yard pass from Luke Weaver, Kansei Matsuzawa kick (Drive: 4 plays, 23 yards, 0:28; Hawaii 37–20)

Statistics	SHSU	HAW
First downs	19	24
Plays–yards	59–248	77–417
Rushes–yards	31–89	34–123
Passing yards	159	294
Passing: Comp–Att–Int	18–28–1	27–43–1
Turnovers	1	2
Time of possession	27:07	32:53

Team	Category	Player	Statistics
Sam Houston	Passing	Mabrey Mattauer	12/18, 91 yards, INT
Sam Houston	Rushing	Mabrey Mettauer	16 carries, 45 yards
Sam Houston	Receiving	Elijah Green	3 receptions, 45 yards,TD
Hawaii	Passing	Luke Weaver	27/43, 294 yards, 3 TD, INT
Hawaii	Rushing	Landon Sims	14 carries, 60 yards
Hawaii	Receiving	Pofele Ashlock	7 receptions, 125 yards, 2 TD

=== Portland State (FCS) ===
Portland State Vikings (FCS) (0–3) at Hawaii Rainbow Warriors (2–1) – Game summary

Quarter	1	2	3	4	Total
Vikings (FCS)	0	0	3	0	3
Rainbow Warriors	0	14	3	6	23

at Clarence T.C. Ching Athletics Complex • Honolulu, HI

- Date: September 13, 2025
- Game time: 6:00 p.m. HST
- Game weather: Sunny and breezy, 81 °F (27 °C)
- Game attendance: 11,956
- Referee: Patrick Foy
- TV announcers (Spectrum Sports): Kanoa Leahey (play-by-play) and Rich Miano (analyst)

Game information

First quarter

- No scoring plays.

Second quarter

- (13:09) HAW – Cam Barfield 16-yard pass from Luke Weaver, Kansei Matsuzawa kick (Drive: 10 plays, 73 yards, 4:00; Hawaii 7–0)
- (9:39) HAW – Cam Barfield 31-yard pass from Luke Weaver, Kansei Matsuzawa kick (Drive: 7 plays, 53 yards, 2:35; Hawaii 14–0)

Third quarter

- (9:30) HAW – Kansei Matsuzawa 44-yard field goal (Drive: 12 plays, 61 yards, 5:25; Hawaii 17–0)
- (3:45) PSU – Mathias Uribe 25-yard field goal (Drive: 5 plays, 33 yards, 1:39; Hawaii 17–3)

Fourth quarter

- (8:12) HAW – Kansei Matsuzawa 47-yard field goal (Drive: 14 plays, 51 yards, 6:37; Hawaii 20–3)
- (0:58) HAW – Kansei Matsuzawa 34-yard field goal (Drive: 7 plays, 13 yards, 2:46; Hawaii 23–3)

Statistics	PRST	HAW
First downs	16	18
Plays–yards	58–230	74–357
Rushes–yards	23–41	29–107
Passing yards	189	250
Passing: Comp–Att–Int	23-35-1	27-45-0
Turnovers	1	0
Time of possession	25:53	34:07

Team	Category	Player	Statistics
Portland State	Passing	John-Keawe Sagapolutele	23/35, 189 yards, INT
Portland State	Rushing	Eddy Schultz	3 carries, 23 yards
Portland State	Receiving	Zachary Dodson-Greene	9 receptions, 78 yards
Hawaii	Passing	Luke Weaver	26/42, 240 yards, 2 TD
Hawaii	Rushing	Landon Sims	9 carries, 41 yards
Hawaii	Receiving	Cam Barfield	4 receptions, 50 yards, 2 TD

=== Fresno State (rivalry) ===
Fresno State Bulldogs (3–1) at Hawaii Rainbow Warriors (3–1) – Game summary

Quarter	1	2	3	4	Total
Bulldogs	0	7	6	10	23
Rainbow Warriors	0	9	6	6	21

at Clarence T.C. Ching Athletics Complex • Honolulu, HI

- Date: September 20, 2025
- Game time: 6:00 p.m. HST
- Game weather: Mostly cloudy, 78 °F (26 °C)
- Game attendance: 13,789
- Referee: Gary Reed
- TV announcers (Spectrum Sports): Kanoa Leahey (play-by-play) and Rich Miano (analyst)

Game information

First quarter

- No scoring plays.

Second quarter

- (7:20) HAW – Safety, E.J. Warner fumble forced by De'Jon Benton recovered by Fresno State in endzone (Hawaii 2–0)
- (1:47) HAW – Jamih Otis 37-yard fumble recovery, Kansei Matsuzawa kick (Hawaii 9–0)
- (9:39) FS – Richie Anderson III 13-yard pass from E.J. Warner, Dylan Lynch kick (Drive: 6 plays, 57 yards, 0:56; Hawaii 9–7)

Third quarter

- (7:31) HAW – Kansei Matsuzawa 40-yard field goal (Drive: 9 plays, 34 yards, 2:00; Hawaii 12–7)
- (5:47) FS – Bryson Donelson 1-yard run, two-point conversion failed (Drive: 4 plays, 75 yards, 1:44; Fresno State 13–12)
- (3:15) HAW – Kansei Matsuzawa 52-yard field goal (Drive: 7 plays, 40 yards, 2:32; Hawaii 15–13)

Fourth quarter

- (9:54) FS – Dylan Lynch 26-yard field goal (Drive: 4 plays, 3 yards, 1:28; Fresno State 16–15)
- (5:20) FS – K'Vion Thunderbird 59-yard interception return, Dylan Lynch kick (Fresno State 23–15)
- (0:10) HAW – Blaze Kamoku 10-yard pass from Micah Alejado, two-point conversion failed (Drive: 12 plays, 77 yards, 2:56; Fresno State 23–21)

Statistics	FRES	HAW
First downs	16	19
Plays–yards	61–301	74–308
Rushes–yards	32–71	27–89
Passing yards	230	219
Passing: Comp–Att–Int	22–29–0	28–47–3
Turnovers	1	4
Time of possession	30:10	29:50

Team	Category	Player	Statistics
Fresno State	Passing	E.J. Warner	22/29, 230 yards, TD
Fresno State	Rushing	Rayshon Luke	10 carries, 39 yards
Fresno State	Receiving	Kamron Beachem	2 receptions, 84 yards
Hawaii	Passing	Micah Alejado	28/47, 219 yards, TD, 3 INT
Hawaii	Rushing	Micah Alejado	3 carries, 31 yards
Hawaii	Receiving	Pofele Ashlock	8 receptions, 68 yards

=== at Air Force (rivalry) ===
Hawaii Rainbow Warriors (3–2) at Air Force Falcons (1–2) – Game summary

Quarter	1	2	3	4	Total
Rainbow Warriors	14	3	7	20	44
Falcons	7	0	7	21	35

at Falcon Stadium • Air Force Academy, CO

- Date: September 27, 2025
- Game time: 10:00 a.m. HST
- Game weather: Sunny, 76 °F (24 °C)
- Game attendance: 22,677
- Referee: Cal McNeill
- TV announcers (FS1): Eric Collins (play-by-play) and Spencer Tillman (analyst)

Game information

First quarter

- (11:25) HAW – Jackson Harris 6-yard pass from Micah Alejado, Kansei Matsuzawa kick (Drive: 6 plays, 75 yards, 3:35; Hawaii 7–0)
- (9:16) AFA – Bruin Fleischmann 5-yard pass from Liam Szarka, Jacob Medina kick (Drive: 4 plays, 74 yards, 2:04; Tied 7–7)
- (6:11) HAW – Brandon White 24-yard pass from Micah Alejado, Kansei Matsuzawa kick (Drive: 6 plays, 75 yards, 3:05; Hawaii 14–7)

Second quarter

- (3:49) HAW – Kansei Matsuzawa 24-yard field goal (Drive: 24 plays, 80 yards, 12:14; Hawaii 17–7)

Third quarter

- (12:33) AFA – Kade Frew 11-yard run, Jacob Medina kick (Drive: 5 plays, 75 yards, 2:27; Hawaii 17–14)
- (2:44) HAW – Landon Sims 1-yard run, Kansei Matsuzawa kick (Drive: 10 plays, 55 yards, 4:49; Hawaii 24–14)

Fourth quarter

- (14:55) HAW – Cam Barfield 27-yard run, Kansei Matsuzawa kick (Drive: 4 plays, 37 yards, 1:30; Hawaii 31–14)
- (14:04) AFA – Cade Harris 73-yard pass from Liam Szarka, Jacob Medina kick (Drive: 2 plays, 75 yards, 0:51; Hawaii 31–21)
- (11:14) HAW – Kansei Matsuzawa 39-yard field goal (Drive: 7 plays, 21 yards, 2:46; Hawaii 34–21)
- (5:58) AFA – Kemper Hodges 2-yard run, Jacob Medina kick (Drive: 10 plays, 75 yards, 5:16; Hawaii 34–21)
- (5:06) HAW – Jackson Harris 74-yard pass from Micah Alejado, Kansei Matsuzawa kick (Drive: 3 plays, 75 yards, 0:52; Hawaii 41–28)
- (4:30) AFA – Quin Smith 34-yard pass from Liam Szarka, Jacob Medina kick (Drive: 2 plays, 75 yards, 0:36; Hawaii 41–35)
- (0:34) HAW – Kansei Matsuzawa 24-yard field goal (Drive: 9 plays, 67 yards, 3:55; Hawaii 44–35)

Statistics	HAW	AFA
First downs	26	17
Plays–yards	78–535	47–494
Rushes–yards	31–78	34–216
Passing yards	457	278
Passing: Comp–Att–Int	35–47–0	10–13–1
Turnovers	0	1
Time of possession	37:24	22:36

Team	Category	Player	Statistics
Hawaii	Passing	Micah Alejado	35/47, 457 yards, 3 TD
Hawaii	Rushing	Landon Sims	13 carries, 59 yards, TD
Hawaii	Receiving	Jackson Harris	7 receptions, 144 yards, TD
Air Force	Passing	Liam Szarka	10/12, 278 yards, 3 TD, INT
Air Force	Rushing	Liam Szarka	17 carries, 139 yards
Air Force	Receiving	Cade Harris	3 receptions, 116 yards, TD

=== Utah State ===
Utah State Aggies (3–2) at Hawaii Rainbow Warriors (4–2) – Game summary

Quarter	1	2	3	4	Total
Aggies	3	17	6	0	26
Rainbow Warriors	10	14	3	17	44

at Clarence T.C. Ching Athletics Complex • Honolulu, HI

- Date: October 11, 2025
- Game time: 6:00 p.m. HST
- Game weather: Sunny, 81 °F (27 °C)
- Game attendance: 13,023
- Referee: Nolan Dumas
- TV announcers (Spectrum Sports): Kanoa Leahey (play-by-play) and Larry Beil (analyst)

Game information

First quarter

- (8:53) HAW – Kansei Matsuzawa 31-yard field goal (Drive: 7 plays, 26 yards, 3:24; Hawaii 3–0)
- (4:31) USU – Tanner Rinker 20-yard field goal (Drive: 11 plays, 73 yards, 4:22; Tied 3–3)
- (2:27) HAW – Pofele Ashlock 18-yard pass from Micah Alejado, Kansei Matsuzawa kick (Drive: 4 plays, 75 yards, 2:04; Hawaii 10–3)

Second quarter

- (9:36) USU – Miles Davis 2-yard run, Tanner Rinker kick (Drive: 7 plays, 47 yards, 2:27; Tied 10–10)
- (8:11) USU – Javen Jacobs 30-yard pass from Anthony Garcia, Tanner Rinker kick (Drive: 1 play, 30 yards, 0:08; Utah State 17–10)
- (5:45) HAW – Pofele Ashlock 7-yard pass from Micah Alejado, Kansei Matsuzawa kick (Drive: 6 plays, 75 yards, 2:26; Tied 17–17)
- (1:05) USU – Tanner Rinker 40-yard field goal (Drive: 11 plays, 64 yards, 1:50; Utah State 20–17)
- (0:24) HAW – Pofele Ashlock 31-yard pass from Micah Alejado, Kansei Matsuzawa kick (Drive: 6 plays, 75 yards, 0:41; Hawaii 24–20)

Third quarter

- (14:01) USU – Broc Lane 32-yard pass from Bryson Barnes, Tanner Rinker kick blocked (Drive: 3 plays, 44 yards, 0:59; Utah State 26–24)
- (3:20) HAW – Kansei Matsuzawa 46-yard field goal (Drive: 9 plays, 38 yards, 3:20; Hawaii 27–26)

Fourth quarter

- (11:55) HAW – Micah Alejado 15-yard run, Kansei Matsuzawa kick (Drive: 11 plays, 81 yards, 4:56; Hawaii 34–26)
- (7:47) HAW – Kansei Matsuzawa 36-yard field goal (Drive: 7 plays, 45 yards, 2:49; Hawaii 37–26)
- (3:48) HAW – Landon Sims 4-yard run, Kansei Matsuzawa kick (Drive: 6 plays, 36 yards, 2:57; Hawaii 44–26)

Statistics	USU	HAW
First downs	20	26
Plays–yards	66–435	83–546
Rushes–yards	29–166	29–133
Passing yards	269	413
Passing: Comp–Att–Int	19–37–1	34–54–1
Turnovers	2	1
Time of possession	25:59	34:01

Team	Category	Player	Statistics
Utah State	Passing	Bryson Barnes	14/26, 175 yards, TD, INT
Utah State	Rushing	Miles Davis	15 carries, 102 yards, TD
Utah State	Receiving	Braden Pegan	3 receptions, 84 yards
Hawaii	Passing	Micah Alejado	34/54, 413 yards, 3 TD, INT
Hawaii	Rushing	Landon Sims	10 carries, 86 yards, TD
Hawaii	Receiving	Jackson Harris	7 receptions, 117 yards

=== at Colorado State ===
Hawaii Rainbow Warriors (5–2) at Colorado State Rams (2–4) – Game summary

Quarter	1	2	3	4	Total
Rainbow Warriors	7	7	10	7	31
Rams	7	0	0	12	19

at Canvas Stadium • Fort Collins, CO

- Date: October 18, 2025
- Game time: 1:00 p.m. HST
- Game weather: Sunny, 55 °F (13 °C)
- Game attendance: 40,416
- Referee: Gary Reed
- TV announcers (Spectrum Sports): Kanoa Leahey (play-by-play) and Rich Miano (analyst)

Game information

First quarter

- (8:38) HAW – Nick Cenacle 17-yard pass from Micah Alejado, Kansei Matsuzawa kick (Drive: 10 plays, 65 yards, 5:25; Hawaii 7–0)
- (0:00) CSU – Javion Kinnard 91-yard punt return, Isaiah Hankins kick (Tied 7–7)

Second quarter

- (5:54) HAW – Jackson Harris 75-yard pass from Micah Alejado, Kansei Matsuzawa kick (Drive: 1 play, 75 yards, 0:12; Hawaii 14–7)

Third quarter

- (9:50) HAW – Jackson Harris 9-yard pass from Micah Alejado, Kansei Matsuzawa kick (Drive: 8 plays, 65 yards, 5:10; Hawaii 21–7)
- (3:09) HAW – Kansei Matsuzawa 26-yard field goal (Drive: 11 plays, 54 yards, 5:18; Hawaii 24–7)

Fourth quarter

- (11:58) CSU – Armani Winfield 7-yard pass from Jackson Brousseau, two-point conversion failed (Drive: 14 plays, 75 yards, 6:11; Hawaii 24–13)
- (6:50) CSU – Tahj Bullock 3-yard run, two-point conversion failed (Drive: 7 plays, 45 yards, 2:49; Hawaii 24–19)
- (2:23) HAW – Cam Barfield 35-yard run, Kansei Matsuzawa kick (Drive: 8 plays, 75 yards, 4:27; Hawaii 31–19)

Statistics	HAW	CSU
First downs	19	15
Plays–yards	66–435	63–261
Rushes–yards	28–134	34–85
Passing yards	301	176
Passing: Comp–Att–Int	26–38–1	15–29–0
Turnovers	1	1
Time of possession	34:59	25:01

Team	Category	Player	Statistics
Hawaii	Passing	Micah Alejado	26/38, 301 yards, 3 TD, INT
Hawaii	Rushing	Landon Sims	12 carries, 59 yards
Hawaii	Receiving	Jackson Harris	5 receptions, 109 yards, 2 TD
Colorado State	Passing	Jackson Brousseau	15/29, 176 yards, TD
Colorado State	Rushing	Lloyd Avant	8 carries, 50 yards
Colorado State	Receiving	Tay Lanier	2 receptions, 56 yards

=== at San Jose State (Dick Tomey Legacy Game) ===
Hawaii Rainbow Warriors (6–2) at San Jose State Spartans (2–5) – Game summary

Quarter	1	2	3	4	Total
Rainbow Warriors	7	7	14	10	38
Spartans	7	24	7	7	45

at CEFCU Stadium • San Jose, CA

- Date: November 1, 2025
- Game time: 4:30 p.m. HST
- Game weather: Sunny, 63 °F (17 °C), NW 2 mph
- Game attendance: 16,012
- Referee: Kenneth Ray
- TV announcers (CBSSN): Alex Del Barrio (play-by-play) and Randy Cross (analyst)

Game information

First quarter

- (6:17) HAW – Cam Barfield 1-yard run, Kansei Matsuzawa kick (Drive: 13 plays, 71 yards, 6:48; Hawaii 7–0)
- (0:51) SJSU – Steve Chavez-Soto 10-yard run, Denis Lynch kick (Drive: 2 plays, 47 yards, 0:32; Tied 7–7)

Second quarter

- (9:49) SJSU – Steve Chavez-Soto 20-yard run, Denis Lynch kick (Drive: 11 plays, 87 yards, 4:28; San Jose State 14–7)
- (5:40) SJSU – Lamar Radcliffe 2-yard run, Denis Lynch kick (Drive: 8 plays, 104 yards, 2:31; San Jose State 21–7)
- (4:07) HAW – Jackson Harris 68-yard pass from Micah Alejado, Kansei Matsuzawa kick (Drive: 2 plays, 66 yards, 0:49; San Jose State 21–14)
- (3:29) SJSU – Danny Scudero 50-yard pass from Walker Eget, Denis Lynch kick (Drive: 2 plays, 73 yards, 0:32; San Jose State 28–14)
- (0:27) SJSU – Mathias Brown 24-yard field goal (Drive: 8 plays, 57 yards, 1:34; San Jose State 31–14)

Third quarter

- (9:46) HAW – Landon Sims 6-yard pass from Micah Alejado, Kansei Matsuzawa kick (Drive: 9 plays, 70 yards, 5:07; San Jose State 31–21)
- (9:02) SJSU – Danny Scudero 62-yard pass from Walker Eget, Denis Lynch kick (Drive: 3 plays, 75 yards, 0:44; San Jose State 38–21)
- (0:04) HAW – Landon Sims 2-yard run, Kansei Matsuzawa kick (Drive: 4 plays, 59 yards, 1:53; San Jose State 38–28)

Fourth quarter

- (9:32) HAW – Jackson Harris 20-yard pass from Micah Alejado, Kansei Matsuzawa kick (Drive: 9 plays, 73 yards, 3:25; San Jose State 38–35)
- (5:37) SJSU – Steve Chavez-Soto 1-yard run, Denis Lynch kick (Drive: 7 plays, 75 yards, 3:55; San Jose State 45–35)
- (1:16) HAW – Kansei Matsuzawa 24-yard field goal (Drive: 13 plays, 69 yards, 4:21; San Jose State 45–38)

Statistics	HAW	SJSU
First downs	22	26
Plays–yards	72–496	68–630
Rushes–yards	25–95	28–172
Passing yards	401	458
Passing: Comp–Att–Int	32–47–0	20–40–0
Turnovers	1	0
Time of possession	33:10	26:50

Team	Category	Player	Statistics
Hawaii	Passing	Micah Alejado	31/46, 367 yards, 3 TD
Hawaii	Rushing	Landon Sims	13 carries, 57 yards, TD
Hawaii	Receiving	Jackson Harris	6 receptions, 134 yards, 2 TD
San Jose State	Passing	Walker Eget	20/40, 458 yards, 2 TD
San Jose State	Rushing	Lamar Radcliffe	10 carries, 97 yards, TD
San Jose State	Receiving	Danny Scudero	7 receptions, 215 yards, 2 TD

=== San Diego State ===
San Diego State Aztecs (7–1) at Hawaii Rainbow Warriors (6–3) – Game summary

Quarter	1	2	3	4	Total
Aztecs	3	3	0	0	6
Rainbow Warriors	14	10	14	0	38

at Clarence T.C. Ching Athletics Complex • Honolulu, HI

- Date: November 8, 2025
- Game time: 6:00 p.m. HST
- Game weather: Rain, 74 °F (23 °C), NE 11 mph
- Game attendance: 15,194
- Referee: Cal McNeill
- TV announcers (Spectrum Sports): Kanoa Leahey (play-by-play) and Rich Miano (analyst)

Game information

First quarter

- (10:47) SDSU – Gabriel Plascencia 42-yard field goal (Drive: 4 plays, 1 yard, 1:22; San Diego State 3–0)
- (6:37) HAW – Jackson Harris 9-yard pass from Micah Alejado, Kansei Matsuzawa kick (Drive: 9 plays, 75 yards, 4:10; Hawaii 7–3)
- (2:14) HAW – Jackson Harris 34-yard pass from Micah Alejado, Kansei Matsuzawa kick (Drive: 7 plays, 70 yards, 2:44; Hawaii 14–3)

Second quarter

- (14:56) SDSU – Gabriel Plascencia 43-yard field goal (Drive: 5 plays, 53 yards, 2:10; Hawaii 14–6)
- (12:54) HAW – Jackson Harris 35-yard pass from Micah Alejado, Kansei Matsuzawa kick (Drive: 6 plays, 75 yards, 2:02; Hawaii 21–6)
- (4:23) HAW – Kansei Matsuzawa 22-yard field goal (Drive: 16 plays, 76 yards, 7:32; Hawaii 24–6)

Third quarter

- (14:49) HAW – Cam Barfield 86-yard kickoff return, Kansei Matsuzawa kick (Hawaii 31–6)
- (2:07) HAW – Elijah Palmer 53-yard interception, Kansei Matsuzawa kick (Hawaii 38–6)

Fourth quarter

Statistics	SDSU	HAW
First downs	12	20
Plays–yards	62–267	69–386
Rushes–yards	34–135	35–130
Passing yards	132	256
Passing: Comp–Att–Int	10–28–2	22–34–1
Turnovers	4	1
Time of possession	26:54	33:06

Team	Category	Player	Statistics
San Diego State	Passing	Jayden Denegal	10/27, 13 yards, 2 INT
San Diego State	Rushing	Lucky Sutton	18 carries, 78 yards
San Diego State	Receiving	Donovan Brown	3 receptions, 60 yards
Hawaii	Passing	Micah Alejado	22/34, 256 yards, 3 TD, INT
Hawaii	Rushing	Cam Barfield	11 carries, 69 yards
Hawaii	Receiving	Jackson Harris	7 receptions, 130 yards, 3 TD

=== at UNLV ===
Hawaii Rainbow Warriors (7–3) at UNLV Rebels (8-2) – Game summary

Quarter	1	2	3	4	Total
Rainbow Warriors	7	3	0	0	10
Rebels	10	14	0	14	38

at Allegiant Stadium • Paradise, NV

- Date: November 21, 2025
- Game time: 5:30 p.m. HST
- Game weather: None (closed roof)
- Game attendance: 37,106
- Referee: Christian Watson
- TV announcers (FS1): Dan Hellie (play-by-play) and Petros Papadakis (analyst)

Game information

First quarter

- UNLV – Ramon Villela 44-yard field goal, 9:28. Rebels 3–0. Drive: 11 plays, 48 yards, 5:32.
- HAW – Jackson Harris 70-yard pass from Micah Alejado (Kansei Matsuzawa kick), 8:16. Rainbow Warriors 7–3. Drive: 3 plays, 75 yards, 1:12.
- UNLV – Jaden Bradley 8-yard pass from Anthony Colandrea (Ramon Villela kick), 3:47. Rebels 10–7. Drive: 8 plays, 75 yards, 4:29.

Second quarter

- UNLV – Taeshaun Lyons 72-yard pass from Anthony Colandrea (Ramon Villela kick), 13:37. Rebels 17–7. Drive: 4 plays, 82 yards, 1:48.
- UNLV – Keyvone Lee 14-yard run (Ramon Villela kick), 5:45. Rebels 24–7. Drive: 13 plays, 60 yards, 5:45.
- HAW – Kansei Matsuzawa 45-yard field goal, 0:05. Rebels 24–10. Drive: 7 plays, 31 yards, 1:55.

Third quarter

- No scoring plays.

Fourth quarter

- UNLV – Daejon Reynolds 1-yard pass from Anthony Colandrea (Ramon Villela kick), 14:55. Rebels 31–10. Drive: 8 plays, 85 yards, 4:13.
- UNLV – JoJo Earle 27-yard run (Ramon Villela kick), 12:49. Rebels 38–10. Drive: 1 play, 27 yards, 0:06.

Statistics	HAW	UNLV
First downs	12	30
Plays–yards	50–231	67–470
Rushes–yards	26–68	41–217
Passing yards	163	253
Passing: Comp–Att–Int	15–24–1	21–26–0
Turnovers	1	1
Time of possession	24:58	35:02

Team	Category	Player	Statistics
Hawaii	Passing	Micah Alejado	15/24, 163 yards, TD, INT
Hawaii	Rushing	Landon Sims	7 carries, 26 yards
Hawaii	Receiving	Jackson Harris	3 receptions, 79 yards, TD
UNLV	Passing	Anthony Colandrea	21/26, 253 yards, 3 TD
UNLV	Rushing	Jai'Den Thomas	13 carries, 61 yards
UNLV	Receiving	Taeshaun Lyons	2 receptions, 75 yards, TD

=== Wyoming (rivalry) ===
Wyoming Cowboys (4-7) at Hawaii Rainbow Warriors (7-4) – Game summary

Quarter	1	2	3	4	Total
Cowboys	7	0	0	0	7
Rainbow Warriors	7	13	7	0	27

at Clarence T.C. Ching Athletics Complex • Honolulu, HI

- Date: November 29, 2025
- Game time: 6:00 p.m. HST
- Game weather: Sunny • Temperature: 77 °F (25 °C) • Wind: S at 6 miles per hour (9.7 km/h)
- Game attendance: 15,194
- Referee: Brad Carrell
- TV announcers (Spectrum Sports): Kanoa Leahey (play-by-play) and Rich Miano (analyst)

Game information

First quarter

- (8:58) WYO – Jones Thomas 50-yard interception return, Erik Sandvik kick (Wyoming 7–0)
- (3:52) HAW – Cam Barfield 19-yard pass from Micah Alejado, Kansei Matsuzawa kick (Drive: 10 plays, 75 yards, 5:06; Tied 7–7)

Second quarter

- (7:33) HAW – Kansei Matsuzawa 47-yard field goal (Drive: 5 plays, 14 yards, 2:13; Hawaii 10–7)
- (4:47) HAW – Jackson Harris 78-yard pass from Micah Alejado, Kansei Matsuzawa kick (Drive: 2 plays, 80 yards, 0:41; Hawaii 17–7)
- (2:28) HAW – Kansei Matsuzawa 47-yard field goal (Drive: 4 plays, 6 yards, 0:36; Hawaii 20–7)

Third quarter

- (11:36) HAW – Cam Barfield 41-yard run, Kansei Matsuzawa kick (Drive: 6 plays, 75 yards, 3:24; Hawaii 27–7)

Fourth quarter

- No scoring plays.

Statistics	WYO	HAW
First downs	16	14
Plays–yards	65–256	58–417
Rushes–yards	28–54	33–128
Passing yards	202	289
Passing: Comp–Att–Int	20–37–1	17–25–1
Turnovers	1	1
Time of possession	29:02	30:58

Team	Category	Player	Statistics
Wyoming	Passing	Mason Drube	17/32, 179 yards, INT
Wyoming	Rushing	Damashja Harris	5 carries, 17 yards
Wyoming	Receiving	Deion DeBlanc	4 receptions, 39 yards
Hawaii	Passing	Micah Alejado	17/24, 289 yards, 2 TD, INT
Hawaii	Rushing	Cam Barfield	15 carries, 77 yards, TD
Hawaii	Receiving	Jackson Harris	4 receptions, 153 yards, TD

=== California (Hawaii Bowl) ===
2025 Hawaii Bowl
California Golden Bears (7–5) at Hawaii Rainbow Warriors (8–4) – Game summary

Quarter	1	2	3	4	Total
Golden Bears	7	14	0	10	31
Rainbow Warriors	0	10	3	22	35

at Clarence T.C. Ching Athletics Complex • Honolulu, HI

- Date: December 24, 2025
- Game time: 3:00 p.m. HST
- Game weather: Patchy rain nearby • Temperature: 78 °F (26 °C) • Wind: ENE at 19 miles per hour (31 km/h)
- Game attendance: 15,194
- Referee: Chris LaMange
- TV announcers (ESPN): Chris Cotter (play-by-play), Max Browne (analyst) and Harry Lyles Jr. (sideline)

Game information

First quarter

- (7:01) CAL – Jacob De Jesus 41-yard pass from Jaron-Keawe Sagapolutele, Chase Meyer kick (Drive: 8 plays, 87 yards, 4:11; California 7–0)

Second quarter

- (14:55) CAL – Kendrick Raphael 19-yard run, Chase Meyer kick (Drive: 8 plays, 68 yards, 3:02; California 14–0)
- (9:38) CAL – Anthony League 8-yard run, Chase Meyer kick (Drive: 8 plays, 49 yards, 3:13; California 21–0)
- (3:57) HAW – Pofele Ashlock 13-yard pass from Micah Alejado, Kansei Matsuzawa kick (Drive: 12 plays, 75 yards, 5:41; California 21–7)
- (0:27) HAW – Kansei Matsuzawa 29-yard field goal (Drive: 7 plays, 21 yards, 1:18; California 21–10)

Third quarter

- (5:58) HAW – Kansei Matsuzawa 39-yard field goal (Drive: 13 plays, 61 yards, 6:20; California 21–13)

Fourth quarter

- (13:50) HAW – Pofele Ashlock 3-yard pass from Micah Alejado, Cam Barfield pass (Drive: 8 plays, 53 yards, 3:41; Tied 21–21)
- (8:56) CAL – Chase Meyer 22-yard field goal (Drive: 10 plays, 71 yards, 4:54; California 24–21)
- (7:19) HAW – Brandon White 17-yard pass from Micah Alejado, Kansei Matsuzawa kick (Drive: 4 plays, 59 yards, 1:27; Hawaii 28–24)
- (1:57) CAL – Jaron-Keawe Sagapolutele 1-yard run, Chase Meyer kick (Drive: 9 plays, 75 yards, 5:22; California 31–28)
- (0:10) HAW – Nick Cenacle 22-yard pass from Luke Weaver, Kansei Matsuzawa kick (Drive: 10 plays, 68 yards, 1:42; Hawaii 35–31)

Statistics	CAL	HAW
First downs	29	24
Total yards	67–481	72–395
Rushing yards	28–144	23–93
Passing yards	337	302
Passing: Comp–Att–Int	28–39–0	34–49–0
Turnovers	1	0
Time of possession	29:40	30:20

Team	Category	Player	Statistics
California	Passing	Jaron-Keawe Sagapolutele	28/39, 343 yards, TD
California	Rushing	Kendrick Raphael	18 carries, 91 yards, TD
California	Receiving	Jacob De Jesus	9 receptions, 137 yards, TD
Hawaii	Passing	Micah Alejado	32/46, 274 yards, 3 TD
Hawaii	Rushing	Landon Sims	9 carries, 36 yards
Hawaii	Receiving	Pofele Ashlock	14 carries, 123 yards, 2 TD
