= 2025 Hawaii Bowl =

Postseason college football bowl game

2025 Sheraton Hawaii Bowl
- 22nd Hawaii Bowl
California Golden Bears	Hawaii Rainbow Warriors
(7–5)	(8–4)
ACC	MW
31	35
Head coach: Nick Rolovich (interim)	Head coach: Timmy Chang
	1	2	3	4	Total
California	7	14	0	10	31
Hawaii	0	10	3	22	35
- Date: December 24, 2025
- Season: 2025
- Stadium: Clarence T. C. Ching Athletics Complex
- Location: Honolulu, Hawaii
- MVP: Pofele Ashlock (WR, Hawaii)
- Favorite: Hawaii by 1.5
- Referee: Chris LaMange (MAC)
- Attendance: 15,194

United States TV coverage
- Network: ESPN; ESPN Radio
- Announcers: Chris Cotter (play-by-play), Max Browne (analyst), and Harry Lyles Jr. (sideline) (ESPN)

The 2025 Hawaii Bowl was a college football bowl game played on December 24, 2025, at Clarence T. C. Ching Athletics Complex in Honolulu, Hawaii. It was the 22nd annual Hawaii Bowl. The game began at approximately 3:00 p.m. HST and aired on ESPN. The Hawaii Bowl was one of the 2025–26 bowl games concluding the 2025 FBS football season. For the first time since 2013, the game was sponsored by Sheraton Hotels and Resorts, and was officially known as the Sheraton Hawaii Bowl.

The game featured the Hawaii Rainbow Warriors (8–4) from the Mountain West Conference and the California Golden Bears (7–5) from the Atlantic Coast Conference. Hawaii beat California, 35–31.

== Teams ==
Based on conference tie-ins, the game was expected to feature teams from the Mountain West Conference and the American Conference. As Hawaii was bowl-eligible and was not selected to play in the College Football Playoff, the Mountain West's tie-in with the Hawaii Bowl was automatically allocated to Hawaii. The American was unable to fulfill its requirement, and Cal offered to participate in the bowl, which was also supported by ESPN due to Cal's ties to Hawaii.

Cal has numerous ties to Hawaii, with starting quarterback Jaron-Keawe Sagapolutele from nearby Ewa Beach and interim head coach Nick Rolovich having previously played for the Rainbow Warriors alongside Hawaii's current head coach Timmy Chang, and coaching Hawaii to its last bowl game appearance in 2019.

This was the sixth time that California and Hawaii played each other; entering the bowl, the Golden Bears led the all-time series, 3–2.

=== California Golden Bears ===
Cal opened their regular season with three consecutive wins; thereafter, they did not win consecutive games at any point. Finishing their regular season with four wins in their final nine games, the Golden Bears entered the Hawaii Bowl with a 7–5 record.

=== Hawaii Rainbow Warriors ===
Hawaii won six of their first eight games; their record stood at 6–2 at the end of October. The Rainbow Warriors lost two of their final four regular-season games and entered the Hawaii Bowl with a record of 8–4.

== Game summary ==
2025 Sheraton Hawaii Bowl

Quarter	1	2	3	4	Total
California	7	14	0	10	31
Hawaii	0	10	3	22	35

at Clarence T. C. Ching Athletics Complex • Honolulu, Hawaii

- Date: Wednesday, December 24, 2025
- Game time: 3:00 p.m. HST
- Game weather: Sunny • Wind: 8 mph (13 km/h) northeast
- Game attendance: 15,194
- Referee: Chris LaMange
- TV announcers (ESPN): Chris Cotter (play-by-play), Max Browne (analyst), and Harry Lyles Jr. (sideline)
- Box score

=== Statistics ===
Statistics	CAL	HAW
First downs	29	24
Plays–yards	67-487	72-396
Rushes–yards	28-144	23-93
Passing yards	343	302
Passing: comp–att–int	28-39-0	34-49-0
Turnovers		
Time of possession	29:40	30:20

Team	Category	Player	Statistics
California	Passing	Jaron-Keawe Sagapolutele	28/39, 343 yds, 1 TD
California	Rushing	Kendrick Raphael	17 carries, 90 yds, 1 TD
California	Receiving	Jacob De Jesus	9 receptions, 137 yds, 1 TD
Hawaii	Passing	Micah Alejado	32/46, 274 yds, 3 TD
Hawaii	Rushing	Landon Sims	9 carries, 36 yds
Hawaii	Receiving	Pofele Ashlock	14 receptions, 123 yds, 2 TD
