= Luke Weaver (American football) =

American football player

- Weaver in 2026

No. 3 – San Jose State Spartans
- Position: Quarterback
- Class: (redshirt) Senior

Personal information
- Born: Manteca, California, U.S.
- Listed height: 6 ft 3 in (1.91 m)
- Listed weight: 195 lb (88 kg)

Career information
- High school: East Union (Manteca, California)
- College: Modesto (2022–2024); Hawaii (2025); San Jose State (2026–present)
- Stats at ESPN

Luke Weaver is an American college football quarterback who currently plays for the San Jose State Spartans. He previously played for Hawaii and Modesto Junior College.

== Early life ==
Weaver attended East Union High School in Manteca, California, where he played quarterback for the football team. As a senior, he set single-season school records with 3,173 passing yards and 31 touchdowns on 215 completions. In addition to football, Weaver also competed in basketball, volleyball, and golf. After graduating, he continued his football career at Modesto Junior College.

== College career ==
=== Modesto Junior College ===
Weaver began his collegiate career at Modesto Junior College, playing for the Pirates from 2022 to 2024. He was named the team's starting quarterback as a freshman but suffered a dislocated hip in the third game, causing him to miss the remainder of the season. After recovering, he returned as the full-time starter for the next two seasons. During his time at Modesto, Weaver threw for 5,823 yards and 48 touchdowns. He led the Pirates to back-to-back conference championships and earned several honors, including being named a 3C2A All-American in 2024. Weaver was also a two-time 3C2A All-State selection and a two-time Valley Conference Offensive MVP.

=== Hawaii ===
In 2025, Weaver transferred to the Hawaii Rainbow Warriors, where he served as the primary backup to Micah Alejado. He made his Rainbow Warriors debut in the season opener against Stanford, attempting one pass. The following week against Arizona, Alejado suffered a sprained ankle and Weaver entered the game, completing 8 of 16 passes for 66 yards with two interceptions in a 40–6 loss. Weaver made his first FBS start the following week against Sam Houston, completing 27 of 43 passes for 294 yards with three touchdowns and one interception in a 37–20 victory. The following week, he started against Portland State, completing 26 of 42 passes for 240 yards and two touchdowns in a 23–3 win.

Weaver later appeared in the 2025 Hawaii Bowl against California, where he came off the bench in relief and threw the game-winning 22-yard touchdown pass with 10 seconds remaining as Hawaii rallied from a 21–0 deficit to win. Overall, Weaver appeared in five games during the 2025 season, completing 63 of 105 passes for 628 yards and six touchdowns while rushing for 73 yards. Following the season, Weaver entered the NCAA transfer portal.

=== San Jose State ===
Weaver transferred to San Jose State on January 9, 2026. He was named the starting quarterback for the 2026 season opener against No. 14 USC, winning the starting quarterback competition over Robert McDaniel and Daniel Rolovich. In his first start for San Jose State, Weaver completed 21 of 32 passes for 234 yards and two touchdowns and rushed for 42 yards and a touchdown in a 42–26 loss to No. 14 USC.

=== Statistics ===
Season	Team	Games			Passing								Rushing			
Season	Team	GP	GS	Record	Cmp	Att	Pct	Yds	Y/A	TD	Int	Rtg	Att	Yds	Avg	TD
2022	Modesto	3	3	1–2	43	65	66.2	491	7.6	4	1	146.8	38	89	2.3	0
2023	Modesto	11	11	7–4	188	298	63.1	2,366	7.9	19	10	144.1	88	408	4.6	1
2024	Modesto	12	12	9–3	182	291	62.5	2,966	10.2	25	4	173.8	106	531	5.0	6
2025	Hawaii	5	2	2–0	63	105	60.0	628	6.0	6	3	123.4	27	73	2.7	0
2026	San Jose State	8	7	3–4	154	242	63.6	1,810	7.5	11	8	134.9	62	58	0.9	1
JUCO career		26	26	17–9	413	654	63.1	5,823	8.9	48	15	157.6	232	1,028	4.4	7
FBS career		13	9	5–4	217	347	62.5	2,438	7.0	17	11	131.4	89	131	1.5	1
