= Jacob De Jesus =

American football player (born 2002)

Profile
- Position: Wide receiver

Personal information
- Born: March 13, 2002 (age 24); Manteca, California, U.S.
- Listed height: 5 ft 6 in (1.68 m)
- Listed weight: 174 lb (79 kg)

Career information
- High school: Manteca (Manteca, California)
- College: Modesto JC (2021–2022); UNLV (2023–2024); California (2025)
- NFL draft: 2026: undrafted

Career history
- Kansas City Chiefs (2026)

Awards and highlights
- 2× First-team All-ACC (2025) (Note: Selected at all-purpose position and return specialist.); Second-team All-ACC (2025) (Note: Selected at wide receiver position.); 3× First-team All-MW (2023, 2024) (Note: Selected twice at punter returner position. Selected once as kick returner position.); Second-team All-MW (2024) (Note: Selected at kick returner position.)

Career NFL statistics as of Week 10, 2026
- Return yards: 66
- Stats at Pro Football Reference

Jacob Marcus De Jesus (born March 13, 2002) is an American professional football wide receiver. He played college football for the Modesto Junior College Pirates, UNLV Rebels, and California Golden Bears.

== Early life ==
De Jesus attended Manteca High School in Manteca, California. As a junior, he was named co-Offensive Player of the Year of the Valley Oak League. After receiving no football scholarship offers following his high school career, De Jesus enrolled at Modesto Junior College.

== College career ==
=== Modesto JC ===
In two seasons at Modesto Junior College from 2021 to 2022, De Jesus appeared in 20 games and totaled 105 receptions for 1,380 yards and seven touchdowns. He also rushed 56 times for 336 yards and one touchdown and finished his junior college career with 2,550 all-purpose yards, averaging 127.5 all-purpose yards per game. As a freshman, he was named All-Valley Conference as an all-purpose player. As a sophomore, he was named Valley Conference Offensive Player of the Year and earned first-team JC Athletic Bureau CCCFCA All-American honors, in addition to being a first-team All-Region selection. He received an offer from UNLV on January 1, 2023, committed to the Rebels a week later on January 8, signed his National Letter of Intent on February 1, and enrolled at UNLV on July 17.

=== UNLV ===
As a transfer, De Jesus made his FBS and UNLV debut against Bryant, where he led the Rebels in receiving and posted 208 all-purpose yards in the victory, including a 96-yard kickoff return. The following week against No. 2 Michigan, he led the team with five receptions for 46 yards in the loss. In Week 3 against Vanderbilt, he scored his first touchdown for the Rebels in a 40–37 victory while totaling 187 all-purpose yards. In Week 7 against Colorado State, he recorded a season-high nine receptions for 120 yards and 263 all-purpose yards in a win that clinched bowl eligibility for the Rebels. In the Mountain West Championship Game against Boise State, he posted 250 all-purpose yards, including a season-high 181 kick return yards in the loss. In the 2023 Guaranteed Rate Bowl, he had eight receptions for 95 yards and added a season-high 40 rushing yards and a touchdown, totaling 195 all-purpose yards in a loss to Kansas. On the season, he appeared in 14 games with six starts, recording 60 receptions for 606 yards and two touchdowns. He also rushed for 46 yards and one touchdown while accumulating 1,079 return yards, leading the Mountain West in both punt and kick return yardage. For his performance, he was named first-team All-Mountain West as both a kick returner and punt returner. He became the first Rebel since College Football Hall of Fame Randall Cunningham in 1984 to earn all-conference honors at two positions in the same season.

In the 2024 season opener against Houston, De Jesus recorded two receiving touchdowns in a 27–7 victory. In the Conference Championship game, a rematch against Boise State, he totaled 60 all-purpose yards in a 21–7 loss. In the 2024 LA Bowl against California, De Jesus recorded 142 all-purpose yards and a touchdown and was named the game's offensive MVP in a victory. On the season, he appeared in 13 games with nine starts, totaling 36 receptions for 512 yards and three touchdowns while adding 101 rushing yards. For the second consecutive season, he led the conference in punt return yards while accumulating 442 return yards. For his performance, he was named first-team All-Mountain West as a punt returner and second-team All-Mountain West as a kick returner. On December 30, 2024, De Jesus entered the NCAA transfer portal. On January 10, 2025, he committed to the University of California, Berkeley.

=== California ===
De Jesus made his California debut in the season opener against Oregon State, recording four receptions for 26 yards and 177 all-purpose yards in the victory. He scored his first touchdown of the season in Week 3 against Minnesota in a victory. In Week 7 against North Carolina, De Jesus recorded the first of his three 100-yard receiving performances and four games with at least 10 receptions, finishing with 13 catches for 105 yards and a touchdown in the 21–18 win. In Week 10 against No. 15 Louisville, De Jesus delivered a career-high performance, setting career highs with 16 receptions for 158 yards and a touchdown. With California trailing 26–23 in overtime, he caught the game-winning touchdown on fourth-and-goal on a zig route to secure a 29–26 upset victory and clinch bowl eligibility for the Golden Bears. His 16 receptions tied California's single-game school record, and he was named ACC Receiver of the Week. In the 2025 Hawaii Bowl, De Jesus recorded nine receptions for 138 yards and a touchdown in the loss. During the game, he broke California's single-season receptions record, surpassing the previous mark of 100 set by Dameane Douglas in 1998. De Jesus appeared in 13 games, making 10 starts, and finished the season with 108 receptions for 1,030 yards and six touchdowns. His 108 receptions ranked second in the FBS. He earned second-team All-ACC honors at wide receiver. As a return specialist, he ranked among the ACC leaders in punt return yards and punt return average while leading the conference in kickoff returns and finishing second in kickoff return yards. He was also named first-team All-ACC as both a return specialist and an all-purpose player.

=== Statistics ===
College statistics
Season	Team	GP	Receiving				Punt returns				Kick returns			
Season	Team	GP	Rec	Yds	Avg	TD	Ret	Yds	Avg	TD	Ret	Yds	Avg	TD
2021	Modesto	9	41	466	11.4	2	7	96	13.7	0	21	462	22.0	0
2022	Modesto	11	64	914	14.3	5	11	52	4.7	0	12	224	18.7	0
2023	UNLV	14	60	606	10.1	2	16	257	16.1	0	32	822	25.7	0
2024	UNLV	13	36	512	14.2	3	25	252	10.1	0	9	190	21.1	0
2025	California	13	108	1,030	9.5	6	22	259	11.8	0	18	363	20.2	0
JUCO career		20	105	1,380	13.1	7	18	148	8.2	0	33	686	20.8	0
NCAA career		40	204	2,148	10.5	11	63	768	12.2	0	59	1,375	23.3	0

== Professional career ==
Pre-draft measurables
Height	Weight	Arm length	Hand span	Wingspan	40-yard dash	10-yard split	20-yard split	20-yard shuttle	Three-cone drill	Vertical jump	Broad jump	Bench press
5 ft 6 in (1.68 m)	174 lb (79 kg)	27 3/4 in (0.70 m)	8 5/8 in (0.22 m)	5 ft 6 7/8 in (1.70 m)	4.60 s	1.62 s	2.71 s	4.28 s	7.22 s	32.5 in (0.83 m)	9 ft 6 in (2.90 m)	13 reps
All values from Pro Day

De Jesus signed with the Kansas City Chiefs as an undrafted free agent on May 1, 2026. On August 30, he was waived by the Chiefs as a part of final roster cuts. On November 4, De Jesus re-signed with the practice squad. On November 17, he was waived.

== Personal life ==
De Jesus has Native Hawaiian ancestry.
