= Pofele Ashlock =

American football player

No. 5 – Hawaii Rainbow Warriors
- Position: Wide receiver
- Class: Redshirt Senior

Personal information
- Born: Fort Worth, Texas, U.S.
- Listed height: 6 ft 2 in (1.88 m)
- Listed weight: 180 lb (82 kg)

Career information
- High school: Trinity (Euless, Texas)
- College: Hawaii (2022–present)

Awards and highlights
- Second-team All-Mountain West (2025)
- Stats at ESPN

Pofele Ashlock is an American college football wide receiver for the Hawaii Rainbow Warriors.

== Early life ==
Ashlock was born in Fort Worth, Texas, and attended Trinity High School, where, as a senior, he registered 20 catches for 406 yards and four touchdowns along with five rushing attempts for 127 yards and two touchdowns. He was an unranked wide receiver recruit and committed to Hawaii.

== College career ==
As a freshman in 2022, Ashlock was redshirted. Ashlock started all 13 games in 2023, making his collegiate debut against Vanderbilt, recording seven receptions for 127 yards and a touchdown. In Week 11 against Air Force, he recorded a season-high 12 receptions for 67 yards and two touchdowns in a victory. Ashlock finished the season with 83 receptions for 832 yards and nine touchdowns, leading all FBS freshmen in both receptions and receiving yards. He was named the Mountain West Conference Freshman of the Week in back-to-back weeks. He was also selected to the Football Writers Association of America Freshman All‑America Team following the 2023 season.

During the 2024 season, Ashlock appeared in 11 of 12 games, missing one game due to injury, and recorded 61 receptions for 629 yards and six touchdowns. For the second consecutive season, he recorded at least one reception in every game in which he appeared.

In 2025, Ashlock recorded a career-high three touchdown receptions on eight catches for 113 yards against Utah State. In his 11th game of the season against UNLV, he was held without a reception, snapping a 34-game reception streak. In the 2025 Hawaii Bowl against California, he recorded a career-high 14 receptions for 123 yards and two touchdowns and was named the game's MVP. Ashlock finished the season with 76 receptions for 827 yards and eight touchdowns, including four 100-yard games and three multi-touchdown performances, and was named Second Team All–MW and selected to the Associated Press All-Bowl Team.

=== Statistics ===
Year	Team	Games		Receiving			
Year	Team	GP	GS	Rec	Yds	Avg	TD
2022	Hawaii	Redshirt					
2023	Hawaii	13	13	83	832	10.0	9
2024	Hawaii	11	11	61	629	10.3	6
2025	Hawaii	13	13	76	827	10.9	8
Career		37	37	220	2,288	10.4	23
