= Luke Ferrelli =

American football player (born 2005)

No. 12 – Ole Miss Rebels
- Position: Linebacker
- Class: Redshirt Sophomore

Personal information
- Born: November 29, 2005 (age 20)
- Listed height: 6 ft 3 in (1.91 m)
- Listed weight: 230 lb (104 kg)

Career information
- High school: Carlsbad (Carlsbad, California)
- College: California (2024–2025): Ole Miss (2026–present)

Awards and highlights
- ACC Defensive Rookie of the Year (2025)
- Stats at ESPN

Luke Daniel Ferrelli (born November 29, 2005) is an American college football linebacker for the Ole Miss Rebels. He previously played for the California Golden Bears.

== Early life ==
Ferrelli is from Carlsbad, California. His brother, Anthony, also plays college football as a linebacker at Stony Brook University. Ferrelli attended Carlsbad High School where he played as a linebacker, helping the team compile an overall record of 31–4 in three seasons, including a 17–0 record in conference games with Avocado League championships each year. Across his sophomore and junior seasons, he posted 76 tackles, five pass breakups and three sacks. As a senior in 2023, he tallied 56 tackles, 13.5 tackles-for-loss and 5.5 sacks. He was ranked a three-star recruit, the 101st-best linebacker prospect and the 111th-best player in the state by ESPN. Ferrelli initially committed to play college football for the Arizona Wildcats. He later changed his commitment to the Stanford Cardinal, before finally flipping to the California Golden Bears.

== College career ==
Ferrelli redshirted as a true freshman at California in 2024, then became a starter in 2025. In the regular season, he started all 12 games, posting 87 tackles which placed eighth overall in the Atlantic Coast Conference (ACC). His 87 tackles was the best mark nationally among freshmen, and he also recorded five tackles-for-loss, a sack and an interception, being named the ACC Defensive Rookie of the Year and a Freshman All-American by The Athletic for his performance.

On December 31, 2025, Ferrelli announced that he would enter the transfer portal. After initially committing to the Clemson Tigers on January 7, 2026, he changed his commitment to the Ole Miss Rebels on January 22, prompting Clemson head coach Dabo Swinney to accuse Ole Miss head coach Pete Golding of tampering with Ferrelli. On May 22, 2026, it was announced that the NCAA had opened up an investigation into Clemson's tampering allegations against Ole Miss, with the NCAA ordering phone records from Ferrelli, Golding, Ole Miss general manager Austin Thomas, interior linebackers coach Jay Shoop, outside linebackers coach Matt Kitchens, director of player personnel Jai Choudhary, and senior associate athletic director Matt McLaughlin.
