= Micah Alejado =

American football player

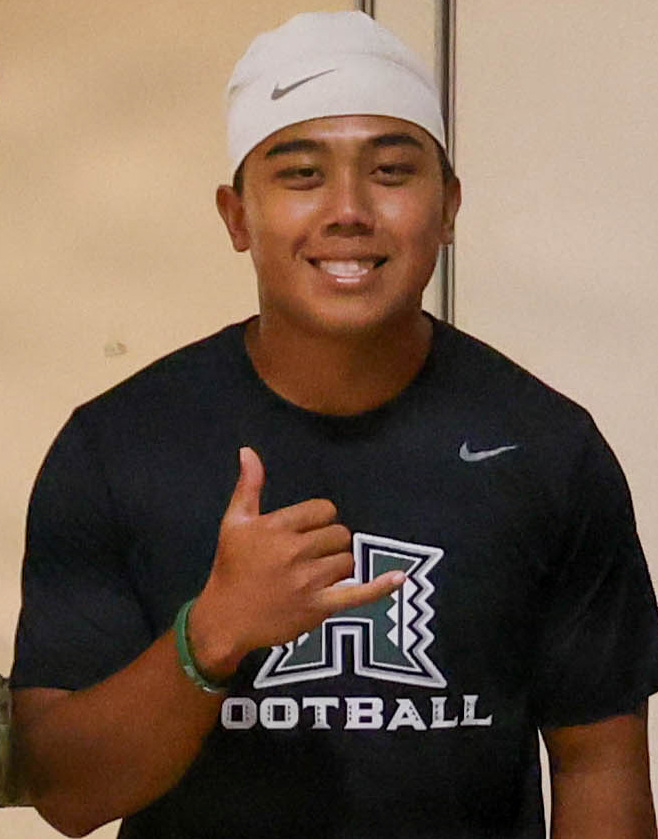
- Alejado in 2026

No. 12 – Hawaii Rainbow Warriors
- Position: Quarterback
- Class: (redshirt) Sophomore

Personal information
- Born: October 11, 2004 (age 22); Honolulu, Hawaii, U.S.
- Listed height: 5 ft 10 in (1.78 m)
- Listed weight: 190 lb (86 kg)

Career information
- High school: Bishop Gorman (Las Vegas, Nevada)
- College: Hawaii (2024–present)

Awards and highlights
- MW Freshman of the Year (2025)
- Stats at ESPN

Micah Alejado (born October 11, 2004) is an American college football quarterback for the Hawaii Rainbow Warriors.

== Early life ==
Alejado attended Bishop Gorman High School in Las Vegas, Nevada. As a senior, he threw for 2,714 yards and 35 touchdowns with no interceptions and completed 77.4% of his passes. He also ran for three touchdowns and 261 yards on 25 carries. Coming out of high school, Alejado was rated as a three-star recruit and held offers from Hawaii, UNLV, and Utah State, ultimately committing to play college football for the Hawaii Rainbow Warriors.

=== High school statistics ===
Season	Team	Games		Passing						
Season	Team	GP	Record	Cmp	Att	Pct	Yds	TD	Int	Rtg
2020	Bishop Gorman	2	2–0	15	24	62.5	245	5	0	136.3
2021	Bishop Gorman	13	12–1	129	178	72.5	2,699	31	2	149.5
2022	Bishop Gorman	15	14–1	182	240	75.8	3,575	54	2	153.5
2023	Bishop Gorman	11	11–0	144	186	77.4	2,714	35	0	158.3
Career		41	39–2	470	628	74.8	9,233	125	4	153.5

== College career ==
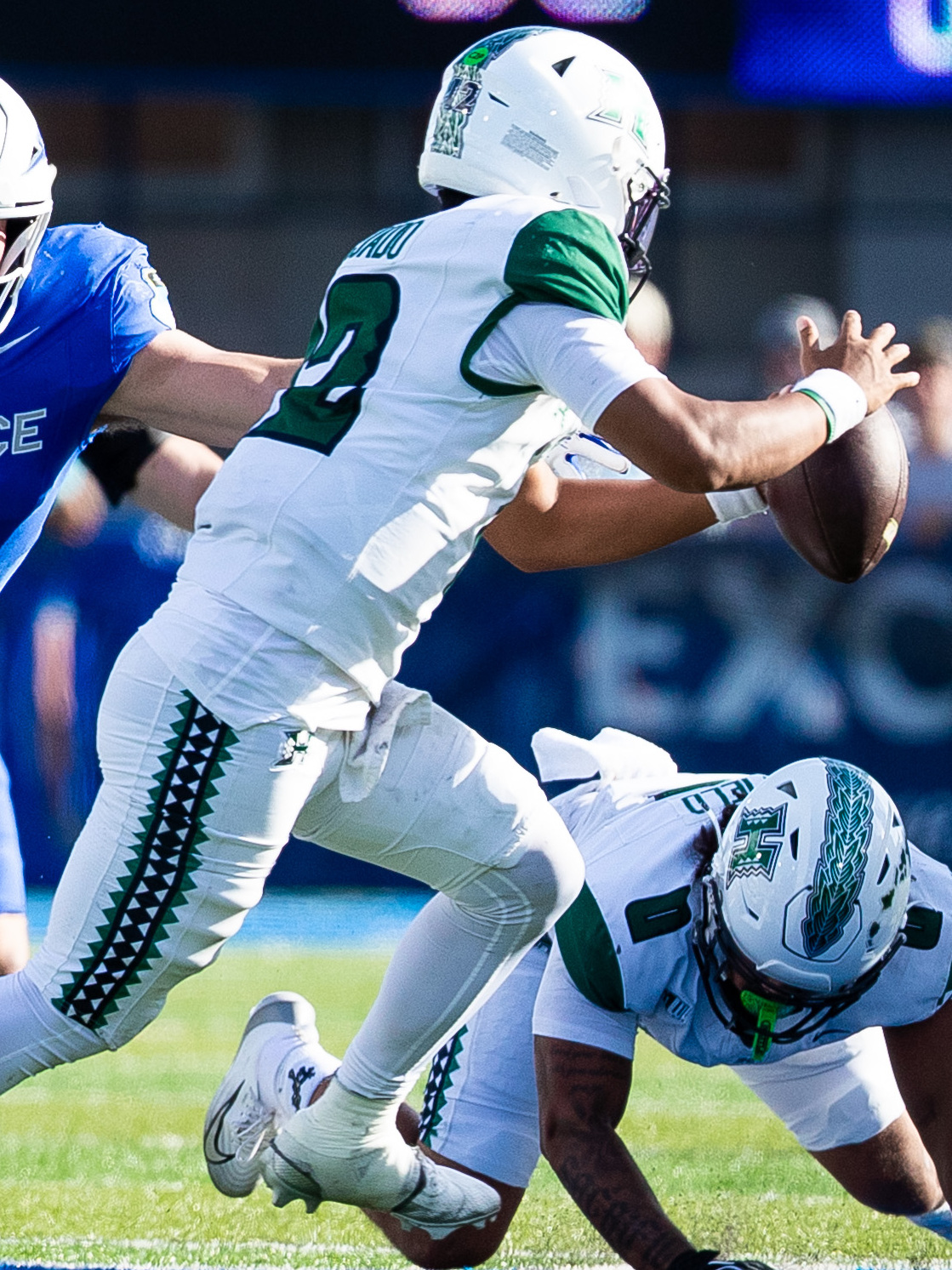
Alejado with Hawaii in 2025

Alejado began his true freshman season as the backup quarterback to Brayden Schager. He made his collegiate debut in Week 4 against Northern Iowa in a 36–7 victory. His first extensive playing time came in Week 11 against Utah State, where he went 11-of-12 passing for 111 yards and one touchdown in a loss. The performance earned him his first collegiate start in the season finale against New Mexico. Alejado completed 37 of 57 passes for 469 yards and five touchdowns, while also adding 54 rushing yards. His performance helped keep New Mexico from bowl eligibility, and his 523 total offensive yards earned him Mountain West Conference Offensive Player of the Week honors while ranking second in single-game total offense performances in the 2024 FBS season. He became the first quarterback in program history to pass for 450+ yards and rush for 50+ yards in a game and recorded the 10th-highest single-game total offense mark in school history. He also set freshman single-game records for passing yards and passing touchdowns. On the season, he finished 49-of-70 passing for 585 yards with six touchdowns, while adding 67 rushing yards and preserving a redshirt.

During the 2025 season, Alejado won the starting quarterback job over transfer Luke Weaver. In the season opener, he led a game-winning drive against Stanford, throwing for 210 yards and two touchdowns, earning Mountain West Conference Player of the Week honors. The following week in a loss against Arizona, he suffered an ankle injury that sidelined him for two games. After returning, he struggled in a loss to Fresno State, throwing three interceptions, but rebounded the following week against Air Force with a season-high 457 passing yards and three touchdowns in a 44–35 victory, earning Offensive Player of the Week honors. That performance started a five-game stretch in which he threw three touchdown passes in each game. In the first four games of that stretch, he passed for over 300 yards in each contest, becoming the only FBS player to accomplish the feat during the season. In the 2025 Hawaii Bowl, he completed 32 of 46 passes for 274 yards and three touchdowns in a victory over California. On the season, he appeared in and started 11 games, completing 285 of 430 passes for 3,106 yards with 24 touchdowns and nine interceptions, while also adding 105 rushing yards and one rushing touchdown. His 24 touchdown passes led the Mountain West, and he also led the conference in completions, attempts, and passing yards per game. For his performance, he was named Mountain West Freshman of the Year and earned six Freshman of the Week honors during the season.

== Career statistics ==
=== College ===
Year	Team	Games			Passing								Rushing			
Year	Team	GP	GS	Record	Cmp	Att	Pct	Yds	Y/A	TD	Int	Rtg	Att	Yds	Avg	TD
2024	Hawaii	4	1	1–0	49	70	70.0	585	8.4	6	0	168.5	20	67	3.4	0
2025	Hawaii	11	11	7–4	285	430	66.3	3,106	7.2	24	9	141.2	81	105	1.3	1
2026	Hawaii	8	8	2–6	202	337	59.9	2,186	6.5	9	6	119.7	46	24	0.5	0
Career		23	20	9–10	536	837	64.0	5,877	7.0	39	15	134.8	147	196	1.3	1
