= Kendrick Raphael =

American football player (born 2003)

No. 6 – SMU Mustangs
- Position: Running back
- Class: Senior

Personal information
- Born: November 15, 2003 (age 22)
- Listed height: 5 ft 11 in (1.80 m)
- Listed weight: 201 lb (91 kg)

Career information
- High school: Naples (Naples, Florida)
- College: NC State (2023–2024); California (2025); SMU (2026–present)
- Stats at ESPN

Kendrick Raphael (born November 15, 2003) is an American college football running back for the SMU Mustangs. He previously played for the NC State Wolfpack and California Golden Bears.

== Early life ==
Raphael attended Naples High School in Naples, Florida. As a senior, he rushed for 1,731 yards and 22 touchdowns. Following his graduation, Raphael committed to North Carolina State University to play college football.

== College career ==
As a freshman in 2023, Raphael totaled 67 carries for 309 yards and a touchdown as a reserve. His playing time increased as a sophomore, rushing for 425 yards and three touchdowns in 12 games. Raphael entered the transfer portal following the conclusion of the season.

Prior to the start of the 2025 season, Raphael transferred to the University of California, Berkeley to play for the California Golden Bears. He played a significant role in the Golden Bears' offense during the season. In California's upset victory over No. 15 Louisville, Raphael totaled 120 yards and a touchdown. He finished the season with 943 rushing yards and 13 touchdowns, while also recording 34 receptions for 245 yards and a touchdown. After the season, Raphael entered the transfer portal for the second time.

In January 2026, Raphael announced his decision to transfer to Southern Methodist University to play for the SMU Mustangs. He is expected to play a significant role in the Mustangs' offense in 2026.

=== Statistics ===
College statistics
Season	Team	Games	Rushing				Receiving			
Season	Team	GP	Att	Yards	Avg	TD	Rec	Yards	Avg	TD
2023	NC State	11	67	309	4.6	1	10	96	9.6	0
2024	NC State	12	78	425	5.4	3	10	41	4.1	0
2025	California	13	232	943	4.1	13	34	245	7.2	1
2026	SMU	7	121	641	5.3	8	10	94	9.4	1
Career		43	498	2,318	4.7	25	64	476	7.4	2
