= Jaron-Keawe Sagapolutele =

American football player (born 2006)

- Sagapolutele in 2026

No. 3 – California Golden Bears
- Position: Quarterback
- Class: Sophomore

Personal information
- Born: August 2, 2006 (age 20)
- Listed height: 6 ft 3 in (1.91 m)
- Listed weight: 225 lb (102 kg)

Career information
- High school: James Campbell (Ewa Beach, Hawaii)
- College: California (2025–present)

Awards and highlights
- Pop Warner Trophy (2025); Polynesian High School Football Player of the Year (2024)

Jaron-Keawe Sagapolutele (born August 2, 2006), nicknamed "JKS", is an American football quarterback for the California Golden Bears.

== Early life ==
Sagapolutele initially attended the Saint Louis School in Honolulu, Hawaii where he played on the junior varsity team as a freshman. As a sophomore, he earned the starting quarterback spot at James Campbell High School. Ahead of his senior season, Sagapolutele competed in the Elite 11 competition. As a senior he tossed for 3,404 yards and 46 touchdowns against three interceptions before suffering a season-ending knee injury. Sagapolutele was named the 2024 MaxPreps Hawaii High School Football Player of the Year. He set the Hawaii state record with 10,653 career passing yards, surpassing Dillon Gabriel.

=== Recruiting ===
Coming out of high school, Sagapolutele was rated by 247Sports as a four-star recruit, the ninth overall quarterback, and the 88th overall player in the class of 2024. He received offers from schools such as California, Oregon, Georgia, Colorado, and Boise State. Sagapolutele initially verbally committed to play college football for the California Golden Bears before flipping his commitment and signing to play for the Oregon Ducks instead.

== College career ==
After initially enrolling at the University of Oregon in 2024, Sagapolutele entered his name into the NCAA transfer portal before the start of his freshman season. In January 2025, he transferred to play at the University of California, Berkeley, where he had previously committed to play prior to going to Oregon. Heading into the 2025 season, he competed with Devin Brown for the Golden Bears' starting quarterback job. On August 18, 2025, head coach Justin Wilcox named Sagapolutele as starting quarterback for the season opener against Oregon State. Sagapolutele joined Jared Goff as the only true freshman quarterbacks to start a season opener for Cal.

On August 30, 2025, Sagapolutele passed for 234 yards and three touchdowns in a 34–15 win at Oregon State, and was named ACC Rookie of the Week. Sagapolutele announced he was continuing with the Bears for the 2026 season, after incoming head coach Tosh Lupoi visited him in Hawaii.

=== Statistics ===
Year	Team	Games			Passing								Rushing			
Year	Team	GP	GS	Record	Cmp	Att	Pct	Yds	Y/A	TD	Int	Rtg	Att	Yds	Avg	TD
2025	California	13	13	7–6	316	492	64.2	3,454	7.0	18	9	131.6	60	–120	–2.0	4
2026	California	9	9	3–6	194	294	66.0	1,892	6.4	11	8	126.7	28	–93	–3.3	0
Career		22	22	10–12	510	786	64.9	5,346	6.8	29	17	129.9	88	–213	–2.4	4

== Personal life ==
Sagapolutele is the younger brother of Portland State quarterback John-Keawe Sagapolutele. He is the nephew of the late Pio Sagapolutele, a former defensive lineman.
