= 2025 LA Bowl =

Postseason college football bowl game

2025 Bucked Up LA Bowl Hosted by Gronk
- 5th LA Bowl
Boise State Broncos	Washington Huskies
(9–4)	(8–4)
Mountain West	Big Ten
10	38
Head coach: Spencer Danielson	Head coach: Jedd Fisch
	1	2	3	4	Total
Boise State	3	0	0	7	10
Washington	3	21	7	7	38
- Date: December 13, 2025
- Season: 2025
- Stadium: SoFi Stadium
- Location: Inglewood, California
- MVP: Offensive: Demond Williams Jr. (QB, Washington); Defensive: Xe'Ree Alexander (LB, Washington)
- Favorite: Washington by 10
- Referee: Edwin Lee (American)
- Attendance: 23,269

United States TV coverage
- Network: ABC/ESPN Radio
- Announcers: Dave Pasch (play-by-play), Dusty Dvoracek (analyst), and Taylor McGregor (sideline) (ABC); Mike Couzens (play-by-play) and Max Browne (analyst) (ESPN Radio)

The 2025 LA Bowl was a college football bowl game that was played on December 13, 2025, at SoFi Stadium in Inglewood, California. The fifth and final LA Bowl began at approximately 5:00 p.m. PST and aired on ABC. The LA Bowl was one of the 2025–26 bowl games concluding the 2025 FBS football season. The game was sponsored by former National Football League player Rob Gronkowski and sports nutrition and lifestyle brand Bucked Up, and was officially known as the Bucked Up LA Bowl Hosted by Gronk.

The Washington Huskies from the Big Ten Conference defeated the Boise State Broncos from the Mountain West Conference by a score of 38–10.

== Teams ==
The game featured the Washington Huskies (8–4), a former Pac-12 Conference legacy team that had moved to the Big Ten, playing against the Boise State Broncos (9–4), champions of the Mountain West Conference. This was the seventh meeting between the two teams; their most recent prior meeting was in 2023, which Washington won, 56–19. This was also the third time the teams had met in bowl games, with Washington winning the 2019 Las Vegas Bowl, 38–7, and Boise State winning the 2012 Las Vegas Bowl, 28–26.

=== Washington Huskies ===
Washington entered the 2025 LA Bowl with a record of 8–4 (5–4 in the Big Ten), tied for fifth place in their conference. This was their first appearance in the LA Bowl. The Huskies started the season with a 5–1 record, but split their last six games 3–3, including a win over No. 23 Illinois and losses to Wisconsin, Michigan, and No. 6 Oregon.

=== Boise State Broncos ===
Boise State entered the bowl game with a record of 9–4 (6–2 in the Mountain West). The Broncos won their final two games, which set up a four-way tie between UNLV, San Diego State and New Mexico. Per Mountain West tiebreaker rules, an aggregate of different computer rankings were used to determine who would play in the conference championship game, with Boise State and UNLV winning the tiebreaker. The Broncos defeated UNLV, 38–21, in the 2025 Mountain West Conference Football Championship Game. This was the team's second appearance in the LA Bowl and their first since the 2023 edition, which they lost to UCLA, 35–22. It was also Boise State's final game as a member of the Mountain West Conference, with the Broncos set to join the Pac-12 Conference in 2026.

== Game summary ==
2025 Bucked Up LA Bowl Hosted by Gronk
Boise State Broncos (9–4) at Washington Huskies (8–4) – Game summary

Quarter	1	2	3	4	Total
Broncos	3	0	0	7	10
Huskies	3	21	7	7	38

at SoFi Stadium • Inglewood, CA

- Date: December 13, 2025
- Game time: 5:00 p.m.
- Game weather: Clear • Temperature: 59 °F (15 °C) • Wind: N/A (indoors)
- Game attendance: 23,269
- Referee: Edwin Lee
- TV announcers (ABC/ESPN Radio): ABC: Dave Pasch (play-by-play), Dusty Dvoracek (analyst) and Taylor McGregor (sideline reporter)
  ESPN Radio: Mike Couzens (play-by-play) and Max Browne (analyst)
- Box score

Game information

First quarter

- (11:35) BOISE - Colton Boomer 52-yard field goal, 11:35. (Drive: 6 plays, 21 yards, 3:16; Broncos 3–0)
- (4:20) WASH - Grady Gross 33-yard field goal, 4:20. (Drive: 15 plays, 60 yards, 7:15; Tied 3–3)

Second quarter

- (9:54) WASH - Denzel Boston 78-yard pass from Demond Williams Jr. (Grady Gross kick), 9:54. (Drive: 2 plays, 82 yards, 0:52; Huskies 10–3)
- (1:56) WASH - Dezmen Roebuck 6-yard pass from Demond Williams Jr. (Grady Gross kick), 1:56. ('"Drive: 7 plays, 57 yards, 3:03; Huskies 17–3)
- (1:17) WASH - Raiden Vines-Bright 3-yard pass from Demond Williams Jr. (Grady Gross kick), 1:17. (Drive: 3 plays, 35 yards, 0:22; Huskies 24–3)

Third quarter

- (12:05) WASH - Quentin Moore 32-yard pass from Demond Williams Jr. (Grady Gross kick), 12:05. (Drive: 6 plays, 70 yards, 2:47; Huskies 31–3)

Fourth quarter

- (10:46) WASH - Jonah Coleman 6-yard run (Grady Gross kick), 10:46. (Drive: 3 plays, 9 yards, 0:49; Huskies 38–3)
- (1:18) BOISE - Matt Lauter 8-yard pass from Max Cutforth (Colton Boomer kick), 1:18. (Drive: 13 plays, 94 yards, 5:01; Huskies 38–10)

Statistics	BOISE	WASH
First downs	16	17
Plays–yards	72–311	61–355
Rushes–yards	58	128
Passing yards	253	227
Passing: comp–att–int	22–43–5	17–28–0
Time of possession	32:06	28:04

Team	Category	Player	Statistics
Boise State	Passing	Max Cutforth	15-27, 302 yards, TD, 3 INT's
Boise State	Rushing	Dylan Riley	10 carries, 34 yards
Boise State	Receiving	Chris Marshall	5 receptions, 97 yards
Washington	Passing	Demond Williams Jr.	15–24, 214 yards, 4 TD's
Washington	Rushing	Jonah Coleman	12 carries, 96 yards, TD
Washington	Receiving	Denzel Boston	6 receptions, 125 yards, TD

== Game recap ==
The Boise State Broncos and Washington Huskies started the game by trading field goals in the first quarter.

Then, in the second quarter, Huskies quarterback Demond Williams launched a 78-yard touchdown pass to Denzel Boston to take a 10–3 lead. After a fourth-down stop on defense, the Washington offense responded with a 57-yard touchdown drive, capped off by a 6-yard touchdown catch by receiver Dezmen Roebuck.

After an interception by Boise State QB Maddux Madsen, Washington scored another touchdown, a 3-yard connection from Demond Williams to Raiden Vines-Bright to extend their commanding lead to 24–3 at the half.

The second half of the game started with a 32-yard touchdown pass by Demond WIlliams Jr. to wide receiver Queinton Moore. After the extra point, the Huskies lead 31-3. The scoring continued in the 4th quarter as Washington running back Jonah Coleman scored his final college football touchdown with a 6-yard run to bring the score to 38-3. The Broncos drove late and added a touchdown on a 8-yard touchdown pass from Max Curforth to Matt Lauter bringing the final score to 38-10.
