= LA Bowl =

College football postseason game

LA Bowl (defunct)
- Bucked Up LA Bowl Hosted by Gronk
- Stadium: SoFi Stadium
- Location: Inglewood, California, U.S.
- Operated: 2021–2025
- Conference tie-ins: Mountain West Conference; Pac-12 Conference
- Website: labowl.sofistadium.com

Sponsors
- Stifel (2021–2022); Starco Brands (2023–2024); Bucked Up (2025)

Former names
- Jimmy Kimmel LA Bowl presented by Stifel (2021–2022); Starco Brands LA Bowl Hosted by Gronk (2023); Art of Sport LA Bowl Hosted by Gronk (2024)

2025 matchup
- Boise State vs. Washington (Washington 38–10)

The LA Bowl was an NCAA Division I Football Bowl Subdivision (FBS) college football bowl game played at SoFi Stadium in Inglewood, California. It was first played in December 2021 and last played in December 2025. The bowl's six-year contract expired after the 2025 edition. (The bowl had first been scheduled to be played following the 2020 season, but it was canceled amid the COVID-19 pandemic.) The game was owned and operated by the owners of SoFi Stadium, StadCo LA, LLC.

The bowl had tie-ins with the Mountain West and Pac-12 conferences. The Pac-12 or its "legacy schools" (the 10 schools that departed the conference in 2024) continued to fulfill the Pac-12 tie-in obligation through the 2025 season. Bowl organizers never released payout totals for the teams involved in the game.

== History ==
The Mountain West Conference and Pac-12 Conference announced tie-ins for the new bowl in July 2019, under a five-year agreement. The game was officially unveiled in February 2020. It matches up the Mountain West champion (or the next-highest pick available if the conference champion is selected for the New Year's Six) against the fifth pick from the Pac-12. Previously, the Mountain West champion had received an automatic bid to the Las Vegas Bowl.

Three weeks before the scheduled bowl game debut on December 30, 2020, the game was canceled due to the COVID-19 pandemic.

On June 16, 2021, the game was renamed the Jimmy Kimmel LA Bowl as part of a naming rights agreement with comedian and late-night talk show host Jimmy Kimmel. Announcing the renaming on Jimmy Kimmel Live!, Kimmel remarked that it was the first bowl game to be named for a living person. The investment bank Stifel was later added as a presenting sponsor.

On October 21, 2023, the bowl announced that it had signed a new multi-year sponsorship deal with former NFL star Rob Gronkowski. On December 1, 2023, it added a naming rights partnership with Starco Brands, renaming the bowl the Starco Brands LA Bowl Hosted by Gronk. In 2024, the sponsorship was moved to Starco's Art of Sport brand, making the game the Art of Sport LA Bowl Hosted by Gronk. On September 30, 2025, it was announced that Bucked Up, a leading sports nutrition brand, signed on as the title sponsor of the game, known as the Bucked Up LA Bowl Hosted by Gronk.

On January 14, 2026, the bowl's permanent cancellation was announced.

== Game results ==
All rankings are taken from the AP poll prior to the game being played.

Date	Winning Team		Losing Team		Attendance	Notes
December 18, 2021	Utah State	24	Oregon State	13	29,896	notes
December 17, 2022	Fresno State	29	Washington State	6	32,405	notes
December 16, 2023	UCLA	35	Boise State	22	32,780	notes
December 18, 2024	No. 24 UNLV	24	California	13	24,420	notes
December 13, 2025	Washington	38	Boise State	10	23,269	notes

== MVPs ==
Year	Offensive MVP			Defensive MVP			Ref.
Year	Player	Team	Pos.	Player	Team	Pos.	Ref.
2021	Deven Thompkins	Utah State	WR	Nick Heninger	Utah State	DE	
2022	Jordan Mims	Fresno State	RB	Devo Bridges	Fresno State	DE	
2023	Ethan Garbers	UCLA	QB	Darius Muasau	UCLA	LB	
2024	Jacob De Jesus	UNLV	WR	Jackson Woodard	UNLV	LB	
2025	Demond Williams Jr.	Washington	QB	Xe'ree Alexander	Washington	LB	

== Appearances by team ==
Updated through the December 2025 edition (5 games, 10 total appearances).

Teams with multiple appearances

Team	Appearances	Record	Win pct.
Boise State	2	0–2	.000

Teams with a single appearance

Won (5): Fresno State, UCLA, UNLV, Utah State, Washington
Lost (3): California, Oregon State, Washington State

== Appearances by conference ==
Updated through the December 2025 edition (5 games, 10 total appearances).

Conference	Record				Appearances by season	
Conference	Games	W	L	Win pct.	Won	Lost
Mountain West	5	3	2	.600	2021, 2022, 2024	2023, 2025
Pac-12	3	1	2	.333	2023	2021, 2022
Big Ten	1	1	0	1.000	2025	
ACC	1	0	1	.000		2024

== Game records ==
Team	Performance vs. Opponent	Year
Most points scored	38, Washington vs. Boise State	2025
Fewest points allowed	6, Fresno State vs. Washington State	2022
Margin of victory	28, Washington vs. Boise State	2025
First downs	27, Fresno State vs. Washington State	2022
Rushing yards	280, UCLA vs. Boise State	2023
Passing yards	280, Fresno State vs. Washington State	2022
Most points scored (losing team)	22, Boise State vs. UCLA	2023
Most points scored (both teams)	57, UCLA vs. Boise State	2023
Fewest yards allowed	182, Fresno State vs. Washington State	2022
Fewest rushing yards allowed	45, Fresno State vs. Washington State	2022
Fewest passing yards allowed	117, Boise State vs. UCLA	2023
Individual	Player, Team	Year
All-Purpose yards	236, Jordan Mims (Fresno State)	2022
Points scored	12, multiple (most recently): TJ Harden (UCLA); Ethan Garbers (UCLA); George Holani (Boise State)	2023
Passing touchdowns	4, Demond Williams Jr. (Washington)	2025
Rushing yards	209, Jordan Mims (Fresno State)	2022
Passing yards	280, Jake Haener (Fresno State)	2022
Receiving yards	142, J. Michael Sturdivant (UCLA)	2023
Receptions	10, Robert Ferrel (Washington State)	2022
Rushing touchdowns	2, shared by: Jordan Mims (Fresno State); George Holani (Boise State); TJ Harden (UCLA)	2022; 2023; 2023
Receiving touchdowns	1, multiple (most recently): Denzel Boston, Dezmen Roebuck, Kayden McGee, Quentin Moore, Raiden Vines-Bright (UW) Matt Lauter (Boise St)	2024, 2025
Tackles	13, Marsel McDuffie (UNLV)	2024
Sacks	3, Nick Heninger (Utah State)	2021
Interceptions	2, Leroy Bryant (Washington)	2025
Long plays	Record, Player, Team vs. Opponent	Year
Touchdown run	66 yds., George Holani (Boise State)	2023
Touchdown pass	78 yds., Demond Williams Jr. to Denzel Boston (Washington)	2025
Kickoff return	79 yds., Kadarius Calloway (Cal)	2024
Punt return	38 yds., Jacob De Jesus (UNLV)	2024
Interception return	29 yds., Xe'ree Alexander (Washington)	2025
Fumble return	0 yds., Jett Elad (UNLV)	2024
Punt	57 yds., Marshall Nichols (UNLV)	2024
Field goal	52 yds., Colton Boomer (Boise St)	2025

== Media coverage ==
The bowl was televised by ABC until the 2024 edition, when it aired on ESPN.
