= 2025 Boise State Broncos football team =

American college football season

2025 Boise State Broncos football

Mountain West Champion

MW Championship Game, W, 38–21 vs UNLV

LA Bowl, L 10–38 vs. Washington
- Conference: Mountain West Conference
- Record: 9–5 (6–2 Mountain West)
- Head coach: Spencer Danielson (2nd season)
- Offensive coordinator: Nate Potter (2nd season)
- Co-offensive coordinator: Matt Miller (1st season)
- Offensive scheme: Pro spread
- Defensive coordinator: Erik Chinander (2nd season)
- Co-defensive coordinator: Tyler Stockton (2nd season)
- Base defense: 4–2–5
- Home stadium: Albertsons Stadium

2025 Mountain West Conference football standings
	Conf.			Overall
Team	W		L	W		L
Boise State y$	6	–	2	9	–	5
UNLV y	6	–	2	10	–	4
San Diego State	6	–	2	9	–	4
New Mexico	6	–	2	9	–	4
Fresno State	5	–	3	9	–	4
Hawaii	5	–	3	9	–	4
Utah State	4	–	4	6	–	7
Air Force	3	–	5	4	–	8
Nevada	2	–	6	3	–	9
Wyoming	2	–	6	4	–	8
San Jose State	2	–	6	3	–	9
Colorado State	1	–	7	2	–	10
Championship: Boise State 38, UNLV 21
$ – Conference champion; y – Championship game participant; Rankings from CFP Rankings

The 2025 Boise State Broncos football team represented Boise State University as a member of the Mountain West Conference during the 2025 NCAA Division I FBS football season. The Broncos were led by second-year head coach Spencer Danielson and played their home games on campus at Albertsons Stadium located in Boise, Idaho. The 2025 season was the final season in the Mountain West Conference as Boise State will move to the Pac-12 Conference in 2026.

== Offseason ==
=== 2025 NFL draft ===
Round	Pick	Player	Position	Team
1	6	Ashton Jeanty	RB	Las Vegas Raiders
6	196	Ahmed Hassanein	DE	Detroit Lions

=== Transfers ===
==== Outgoing ====
Player	Position	Destination
Jackson Grier	WR	Appalachian State
Ty Smith	LS	BYU
Ryan Rodieck	WR	Colorado Mesa
Zamondre Merriweather	WR	Glendale CC
Oliver Fisher	TE	Idaho
Gabe Tahir	S	Idaho State
Khai Taylor	CB	Idaho State
Troy Wilkey	WR	Idaho State
Ethan Mikita	RB	Mary
Demanuel Brown	DE	New Mexico State
Andrew Simpson	LB	North Carolina
Joseph Marsh	EDGE	Ohio
James Ferguson-Reynolds	P	Oregon
Dionte Thornton	CB	Portland State
Tyrone Jackson	WR	San Mateo
Tashi Crofut	LS	UConn
Nick Hawthorne	DB	UMass
Prince Strachan	WR	USC
Malachi Nelson	QB	UTEP
Udoka Ezeani	LB	UTEP
Jack Benson	QB	Western Carolina
Wyatt Milkovic	LB	Western Illinois
Kaden Dudley	HB/WR	Unknown
Tyler Wegis	EDGE	Unknown
Evan Kiely	K	Unknown
Braxton Fely	DL	Withdrawn

==== Incoming ====
Player	Position	Previous School
Demetrius Freeney	CB	Arizona
Sterling Lane II	OLB	Arizona
Keanu Mailoto	DL	Arizona
David Latu	DT	BYU
Kobe Young	WR	Cal State Fullerton (Basketball)
Derek Ganter Jr.	S	Eastern Washington
Malik Sherrod	RB	Fresno State
Dion Washington	DL	Hawaii
Hunter Higham	LS	Hawaii
Malakai Williams	Edge	Idaho
Jaden Mickey	CB	Notre Dame
Miles Walker	OT	Ohio State
Evan Kiely	K	Sacramento State
Colton Boomer	K	UCF
Alma Taleni	OL	Utah
Camden DeGraw-Tryall	EDGE	Washington State
Oscar Doyle	P	Weber State

== Preseason ==
=== Mountain West media poll ===
The Mountain West's preseason prediction poll was released on July 16, 2025.

Mountain West media poll
Predicted finish	Team	Votes (1st place)
1	Boise State	464 (35)
2	UNLV	415 (4)
3	San Jose State	359
4	Colorado State	326
5	Fresno State	301
6	Air Force	280
7	Hawaii	213
8	San Diego State	202
9	Utah State	165
10	Wyoming	150
11	New Mexico	84
12	Nevada	83

== Schedule ==
Date	Time	Opponent	Rank	Site	TV	Result	Attendance
August 28	3:30 p.m.	at South Florida*	No. 25	Raymond James Stadium; Tampa, FL	ESPN	L 7–34	34,707
September 5	7:00 p.m.	Eastern Washington*		Albertsons Stadium; Boise, ID	FS1	W 51–14	32,887
September 20	5:00 p.m.	at Air Force		Falcon Stadium; Colorado Springs, CO	CBSSN	W 49–37	24,046
September 27	5:30 p.m.	Appalachian State*		Albertsons Stadium; Boise, ID	FS1	W 47–14	32,904
October 4	1:30 p.m.	at No. 21 Notre Dame*		Notre Dame Stadium; Notre Dame, IN	NBC	L 7–28	77,622
October 11	7:45 p.m.	New Mexico		Albertsons Stadium; Boise, ID	FS1	W 41–25	32,982
October 18	1:30 p.m.	UNLV		Albertsons Stadium; Boise, ID	FS1	W 56–31	32,927
October 24	8:00 p.m.	at Nevada		Mackay Stadium; Reno, NV (rivalry)	CBSSN	W 24–3	18,029
November 1	1:30 p.m.	Fresno State		Albertsons Stadium; Boise, ID (rivalry)	FS1	L 7–30	32,826
November 15	8:30 p.m.	at San Diego State		Snapdragon Stadium; San Diego, CA	CBSSN	L 7–17	29,201
November 22	5:00 p.m.	Colorado State		Albertsons Stadium; Boise, ID	FS1	W 49–21	32,819
November 28	2:00 p.m.	at Utah State		Maverik Stadium; Logan, UT	CBS	W 25–24	21,115
December 5	6:00 p.m.	UNLV		Albertsons Stadium; Boise, ID (MW Conference Championship Game)	FOX	W 38–21	27,152
December 13	6:00 p.m.	vs. Washington*		SoFi Stadium; Inglewood, CA (LA Bowl)	ABC	L 10–38	23,269
*Non-conference game; Rankings from AP Poll - Released prior to game; All times are in Mountain time

== Rankings ==
Ranking movements Legend: ██ Increase in ranking ██ Decrease in ranking — = Not ranked RV = Received votes
	Week																
Poll	Pre	1	2	3	4	5	6	7	8	9	10	11	12	13	14	15	Final
AP	25	—	—	—	—	—	—	—	RV	—	—	—	—	—	—	RV	RV
Coaches	25	—	—	—	—	—	—	—	RV	RV	—	—	—	—	—	RV	RV
CFP	Not released										—	—	—	—	—	—	Not released

== Game summaries ==
=== at South Florida ===
No. 25 Boise State Broncos (0–0) at South Florida Bulls (0–0) – Game summary

Quarter	1	2	3	4	Total
No. 25 Broncos	7	0	0	0	7
Bulls	0	10	14	7	31

at Raymond James Stadium • Tampa, FL

- Date: August 28
- Game time: 3:30 p.m. MDT
- Game weather: Sunny, 92 °F (33 °C)
- Game attendance: 34,707
- Referee: Nolan Dumas
- TV announcers (ESPN): Matt Barrie (play-by-play), Tom Luginbill (analyst), and Harry Lyles Jr. (sideline)

Game information

First quarter

- (1:10) BOIS – Chris Marshall 6-yard pass from Maddux Madsen, Colton Boomer kick (Drive: 9 plays, 38 yards, 4:35; Boise State 7–0)

Second quarter

- (12:39) USF – Nico Gramatica 52-yard field goal (Drive: 10 plays, 41 yards, 3:31; Boise State 7–3)
- (6:34) USF – Byrum Brown 23-yard run, Nico Gramatica kick (Drive: 8 plays, 80 yards, 3:10; South Florida 10–7)

Third quarter

- (8:18) USF – Keshaun Singleton 45-yard pass from Locklan Hewlett, Nico Gramatica kick (Drive: 4 plays, 49 yards, 1:35; South Florida 17–7)
- (1:44) USF – Byrum Brown 15-yard run, Nico Gramatica kick (Drive: 3 plays, 77 yards, 1:03; South Florida 24–7)

Fourth quarter

- (13:26) USF – Cartevious Norton 8-yard run, Nico Gramatica kick (Drive: 5 plays, 43 yards, 2:09; South Florida 31–7)
- (3:29) USF – Nico Gramatica 33-yard field goal (Drive: 5 plays, 56 yards, 3:05; South Florida 34–7)

Statistics	BOIS	USF
First downs	25	15
Plays–yards	86–378	55–372
Rushes–yards	38–122	28—117
Passing yards	256	255
Passing: comp–att–int	27–48–0	17–25–0
Turnovers	3	0
Time of possession	36:21	23:39

Team	Category	Player	Statistics
Boise State	Passing	Maddux Madsen	25/46, 225 yards, TD
Boise State	Rushing	Sire Gaines	9 carries, 44 yards
Boise State	Receiving	Latrell Caples	4 receptions, 58 yards
South Florida	Passing	Byrum Brown	16/24, 210 yards
South Florida	Rushing	Alvon Isaac	3 carries, 52 yards
South Florida	Receiving	Chas Nimrod	3 receptions, 96 yards

=== Eastern Washington (FCS) ===
Eastern Washington Eagles (FCS) (0–1) at Boise State Broncos (0–1) – Game summary

Quarter	1	2	3	4	Total
Eagles (FCS)	0	7	0	7	14
Broncos	20	10	7	14	51

at Albertsons Stadium • Boise, ID

- Date: September 5
- Game time: 7:00 p.m. MDT
- Game attendance: 32,887
- Referee: Christian Watson
- TV announcers (FS1): Noah Reed (play-by-play) and Robert Smith (analyst)

Game information

First quarter

- BOIS – Malik Sherrod 20-yard run (Colton Boomer kick BLOCKED), 13:50. Broncos 6–0. Drive: 3 plays, 75 yards, 1:10.
- BOIS – Sire Gaines 8-yard run (Colton Boomer kick), 10:01. Broncos 13–0. Drive: 6 plays, 41 yards, 2:03.
- BOIS – Ben Ford 60-yard pass from Maddux Madsen (Colton Boomer kick), 2:49. Broncos 20–0. Drive: 1 play, 60 yards, 0:08.

Second quarter

- EWU – Jared Taylor 5-yard run (Soren McKee kick), 8:53. Broncos 20–7. Drive: 10 plays, 72 yards, 4:43.
- BOIS – Maddux Madsen 11-yard run (Canaan Moore kick), 6:26. Broncos 27–7. Drive: 5 plays, 80 yards, 2:19.
- BOIS – Canaan Moore 35-yard field goal, 0:50. Broncos 30–7. Drive: 5 plays, 31 yards, 0:53.

Third quarter

- BOIS – Cameron Bates 20-yard run (Canaan Moore kick), 4:55. Broncos 37–7. Drive: 9 plays, 65 yards, 4:53.

Fourth quarter

- BOIS – Ben Ford 6-yard pass from Maddux Madsen (Canaan Moore kick), 11:56. Broncos 44–7. Drive: 12 plays, 90 yards, 6:02.
- EWU – Nate Bell 2-yard run (Soren McKee kick), 5:30. Broncos 44–14. Drive: 6 plays, 80 yards, 2:46.
- BOIS – Dylan Riley 77-yard run (Canaan Moore kick), 3:54. Broncos 51–14. Drive: 3 plays, 75 yards, 1:36.

Statistics	EWU	BOIS
First downs	13	22
Plays–yards	68–293	68–637
Rushes–yards	31–117	39–328
Passing yards	176	309
Passing: Comp–Att–Int	19–37–1	17–29–0
Turnovers	2	0
Time of possession	31:36	28:24

Team	Category	Player	Statistics
Eastern Washington	Passing	Jared Taylor	14/28, 102 yards
Eastern Washington	Rushing	Jared Taylor	17 carries, 76 yards, TD
Eastern Washington	Receiving	Noah Cronquist	4 receptions, 67 yards
Boise State	Passing	Maddux Madsen	16/26, 307 yards, 2 TD
Boise State	Rushing	Dylan Riley	6 carries, 123 yards, TD
Boise State	Receiving	Chris Marshall	4 receptions, 132 yards

=== at Air Force ===
Boise State Broncos (1–1) at Air Force Falcons (1–1) – Game summary

Quarter	1	2	3	4	Total
Broncos	14	7	14	14	49
Falcons	7	7	10	13	37

at Falcon Stadium • Air Force Academy, CO

- Date: September 20
- Game time: 5:00 p.m. MDT
- Game weather: Cloudy • Temperature: 66 °F (19 °C) • Wind: N 5 mph
- Game attendance: 24,046
- Referee: Christian Watson
- TV announcers (CBSSN): Jason Knapp (play-by-play), Robert Turbin (analyst) and Brandon Baylor (sideline)

Game information

First quarter

- (11:54) AFA – Dylan Carson 2-yard run, Jacob Medina kick (Drive: 5 plays, 74 yards, 2:07; Air Force 7–0)
- (7:09) BOIS – Dylan Riley 4-yard run, Colton Boomer kick (Drive: 9 plays, 75 yards, 4:45; Tied 7–7)
- (2:38) BOIS – Dylan Riley 34-yard run, Colton Boomer kick (Drive: 5 plays, 68 yards, 1:55; Boise State 14–7)

Second quarter

- (10:25) BOIS – Matt Lauter 3-yard pass from Maddux Madsen, Colton Boomer kick (Drive: 10 plays, 52 yards, 4:32; Boise State 21–7)
- (4:52) AFA – Kemper Hodges 3-yard run, Jacob Medina kick (Drive: 10 plays, 75 yards, 5:33; Boise State 21–14)

Third quarter

- (13:52) AFA – Liam Szarka 1-yard run, Jacob Medina kick (Drive: 3 plays, 75 yards, 1:08; Tied 21–21)
- (11:51) BOIS – Malik Sherrod 40-yard run, Colton Boomer kick (Drive: 4 plays, 75 yards, 2:01; Boise State 28–21)
- (1:10) AFA – Jacob Medina 25-yard field goal (Drive: 19 plays, 67 yards, 10:41; Boise State 28–24)
- (0:58) BOIS – Dylan Riley 75-yard pass from Maddux Madsen, Colton Boomer kick (Drive: 1 play, 75 yards, 0:12; Boise State 35–24)

Fourth quarter

- (9:44) AFA – Quin Smith 12-yard pass from Liam Szarka (Drive: 12 plays, 75 yards, 6:14; Boise State 35–30)
- (5:18) BOIS – Dylan Riley 8-yard run, Colton Boomer kick (Drive: 8 plays, 75 yards, 4:26; Boise State 42–30)
- (2:26) AFA – Bruin Fleischmann 5-yard pass from Liam Szarka, Jacob Medina kick (Drive: 6 plays, 75 yards, 2:52; Boise State 42–37)
- (2:08) BOIS – Dylan Riley 43-yard run, Colton Boomer kick (Drive: 3 plays, 50 yards, 0:16; Boise State 49–37)

Statistics	BOIS	AFA
First downs	23	24
Plays–yards	58–592	75–514
Rushes–yards	31–282	55–268
Passing yards	310	246
Passing: Comp–Att–Int	16–27–1	13–20–1
Turnovers	1	1
Time of possession	23:40	36:20

Team	Category	Player	Statistics
Boise State	Passing	Maddux Madsen	13/23, 276 yards, 2 TD, INT
Boise State	Rushing	Dylan Riley	19 carries, 171 yards, 4 TD
Boise State	Receiving	Latrell Caples	5 receptions, 87 yards
Air Force	Passing	Liam Szarka	13/18, 246 yards, 2 TD, INT
Air Force	Rushing	Liam Szarka	20 carries, 110 yards, TD
Air Force	Receiving	Cade Harris	8 receptions, 177 yards

=== Appalachian State ===
Appalachian State Mountaineers (2–1) at Boise State Broncos (2–1) – Game summary

Quarter	1	2	3	4	Total
Mountaineers	0	7	7	0	14
Broncos	14	10	9	14	47

at Albertsons Stadium • Boise, ID

- Date: September 27
- Game time: 5:30 p.m. MDT
- Game weather: Sunny • Temperature: 81 °F (27 °C) • Wind: SE at 7 miles per hour (11 km/h)
- Game attendance: 32,904
- Referee: Patrick Foy
- TV announcers (FS1): Noah Reed (play-by-play) and Robert Smith (analyst)

Game information

First quarter

- (9:49) BOIS - Latrell Caples 10-yard pass from Maddux Madsen, Colton Boomer kick (Drive: 10 plays, 75 yards, 5:11; Boise State 7-0)
- (1:49) BOIS – A'Marion McCoy 26-yard interception return, Colton Boomer kick (Boise State 14-0)

Second quarter

- (7:07) BOIS - Ben Ford 14-yard pass from Maddux Madsen, Colton Boomer kick (Drive: 10 plays, 80 yards, 5:53; Boise State 21-0)
- (1:16) APP - Dalton Stroman 7-yard pass from AJ Swann, Dominic De Freitas kick (Drive: 14 plays, 75 yards, 5:51; Boise State 21-7)
- (0:05) BOIS - Colton Boomer 25-yard field goal (Drive: 9 plays, 62 yards, 1:11; Boise State 24-7)

Third quarter

- (10:40) APP - Jaquari Lewis 3-yard run, Dominic De Freitas kick (Drive: 3 plays, 42 yards, 0:46; Boise State 24-14)
- (5:59) BOIS - Colton Boomer 40-yard field goal (Drive: 11 plays, 58 yards, 4:35; Boise State 27-14)
- (1:24) BOIS - Quinton Brown 29-yard pass from Maddux Madsen, Two-Point Pass Conversion failed (Drive: 7 plays, 58 yards, 3:07; Boise State 33-14)

Fourth quarter

- (10:21) BOIS - Boen Phelps 33-yard interception return, Colton Boomer kick (Boise State 47-14)

Statistics	APP	BOIS
First downs	9	25
Plays–yards	57–184	82–473
Rushes–yards	29–119	44–152
Passing yards	65	321
Passing: Comp–Att–Int	12-28-3	25-38-0
Turnovers	4	0
Time of possession	21:50	38:10

Team	Category	Player	Statistics
Appalachian State	Passing	AJ Swann	11/24, 64 yards, TD, 2 INT
Appalachian State	Rushing	Rashod Dubinion	17 carries, 113 yards
Appalachian State	Receiving	Izayah Cummings	3 receptions, 20 yards
Boise State	Passing	Maddux Madsen	25/37, 321 yards, 4 TD
Boise State	Rushing	Sire Gaines	12 carries, 74 yards
Boise State	Receiving	Latrell Caples	5 receptions, 84 yards, 2 TD

=== at No. 21 Notre Dame ===
Boise State Broncos (3–1) at No. 21 Notre Dame Fighting Irish (2–2) – Game summary

Quarter	1	2	3	4	Total
Broncos	0	7	0	0	7
No. 21 Fighting Irish	6	8	7	7	28

at Notre Dame Stadium • South Bend, IN

- Date: October 4
- Game time: 1:30 p.m. MDT
- Game weather: Sunny, 84 °F (29 °C)
- Game attendance: 77,622
- Referee: Justin Elliott
- TV announcers (NBC): Dan Hicks (play-by-play), Jason Garrett (analyst) and Zora Stephenson (sideline)

Game information

First quarter

- (4:47) ND – Will Pauling 19-yard pass from CJ Carr, Erik Schmidt kick blocked (Drive: 6 plays, 69 yards, 2:25, Notre Dame 6–0)

Second quarter

- (4:03) BOIS – Maddux Madsen 1-yard run, Colton Boomer kick (Drive: 10 plays, 72 yards, 5:24, Boise State 7–6)
- (0:48) ND – Jeremiyah Love 4-yard run, Will Pauling pass from CJ Carr for two-point conversion (Drive: 9 plays, 75 yards, 3:15, Notre Dame 14–7)

Third quarter

- (5:49) ND – Malachi Fields 6-yard pass from CJ Carr, Marcello Diomede kick (Drive: 10 plays, 79 yards, 4:31, Notre Dame 21–7)

Fourth quarter

- (7:54) ND – Jadarian Price 49-yard run, Marcello Diomede kick (Drive: 2 plays, 52 yards, 0:43, Notre Dame 28–7)

Statistics	BOIS	ND
First downs	23	19
Plays–yards	71–315	54–389
Rushes–yards	34–100	31–200
Passing yards	215	189
Passing: Comp–Att–Int	22–37–4	15–23–0
Turnovers	4	0
Time of possession	35:46	24:14

Team	Category	Player	Statistics
Boise State	Passing	Maddux Madsen	22/37, 215 yards, 4 INT
Boise State	Rushing	Sire Gaines	11 carries, 39 yards
Boise State	Receiving	Chris Marshall	4 receptions, 58 yards
Notre Dame	Passing	CJ Carr	15/23, 189 yards, 2 TD
Notre Dame	Rushing	Jeremiyah Love	16 carries, 103 yards, TD
Notre Dame	Receiving	Jordan Faison	6 receptions, 83 yards

=== New Mexico ===
New Mexico Lobos (3–2) at Boise State Broncos (3–2) – Game summary

Quarter	1	2	3	4	Total
Lobos	0	14	3	8	25
Broncos	10	7	3	21	41

at Albertsons Stadium • Boise, ID

- Date: October 11
- Game time: 7:45 p.m. MDT
- Game weather: Cloudy • Temperature: 55 °F (13 °C) • Wind: NW at 6 miles per hour (9.7 km/h)
- Game attendance: 32,982
- Referee: Brad Carrell
- TV announcers (FS1): Noah Reed (play-by-play) and Robert Smith (analyst)

Game information

First quarter

- (11:19) BOIS - Colton Boomer 24-yard field goal (Drive: 8 plays, 12 yards, 3:29; Boise State 3-0)
- (0:00) BOIS – Sire Gaines 2-yard run, Colton Boomer kick (Drive: 13 plays, 74 yards, 6:37; Boise State 10-0)

Second quarter

- (14:47) UNM - Damon Bankston 100-yard kickoff return (Boise State 10-7)
- (10:30) UNM - Dorian Thomas 1-yard pass from Jack Layne, Luke Drzewiecki kick (Drive: 8 plays, 58 yards, 2:50; New Mexico 14-10)
- (3:20) BOIS - Ben Ford 6-yard pass from Maddux Madsen, Colton Boomer kick (Drive: 14 plays, 75 yards, 7:10; Boise State 17-14)

Third quarter

- (9:22) BOIS - Colton Boomer 50-yard field goal (Drive: 11 plays, 43 yards, 5:38; Boise State 20-14)
- (4:21) UNM - Luke Drzewiecki 29-yard field goal (Drive: 10 plays, 64 yards, 5:01; Boise State 20-17)

Fourth quarter

- (14:22) BOIS - Sire Gaines 4-yard run, Colton Boomer kick (Drive: 9 plays, 75 yards, 4:59; Boise State 27-17)
- (7:31) BOIS - Troy Grizzle 10-yard pass from Oscar Doyle, Colton Boomer kick (Drive: 9 plays, 46 yards, 4:18; Boise State 34-17)
- (5:14) BOIS - Ben Ford 25-yard pass from Maddux Madsen, Colton Boomer kick (Drive: 4 plays, 33 yards, 1:36; Boise State 41-17)
- (1:16) UNM - Keagan Johnson 4-yard pass from James Laubstein, James Laubstein run for two-point conversion (Drive: 15 plays, 75 yards, 3:58; Boise State 41-25)

Statistics	UNM	BOIS
First downs	11	27
Plays–yards	54–231	86–397
Rushes–yards	24–49	54–161
Passing yards	182	236
Passing: Comp–Att–Int	15–30–2	22–32–0
Turnovers	3	0
Time of possession	19:25	40:35

Team	Category	Player	Statistics
New Mexico	Passing	Jack Layne	7/17, 115 yards, TD, 2 INT
New Mexico	Rushing	Damon Bankston	9 carries, 18 yards
New Mexico	Receiving	Dorian Thomas	4 receptions, 61 yards, TD
Boise State	Passing	Maddux Madsen	21/31, 226 yards, 2 TD
Boise State	Rushing	Dylan Riley	18 carries, 101 yards
Boise State	Receiving	Ben Ford	6 receptions, 78 yards, 2 TD

=== UNLV ===
UNLV Rebels (6–0) at Boise State Broncos (4–2) – Game summary

Quarter	1	2	3	4	Total
Rebels	3	21	0	7	31
Broncos	14	14	21	7	56

at Albertsons Stadium • Boise, ID

- Date: October 18
- Game time: 1:30 p.m. MDT
- Game weather: Sunny • Temperature: 55 °F (13 °C) • Wind: W at 3 miles per hour (4.8 km/h)
- Game attendance: 32,927
- Referee: Nolan Dumas
- TV announcers (FS1): Dan Hellie (play-by-play) and Petros Papadakis (analyst)

Game information

First quarter

- (11:26) BOIS - Sire Gaines 2-yard run, Colton Boomer kick (Drive: 6 plays, 60 yards, 2:13; Boise State 7-0)
- (3:10) UNLV – Ramon Villela 38-yard field goal (Drive: 6 plays, 35 yards, 3:05; Boise State 7-3)
- (1:14) BOIS - Cameron Bates 35-yard run, Colton Boomer kick (Drive: 4 plays, 75 yards, 1:56; Boise State 14-3)

Second quarter

- (9:33) UNLV - Jai'Den Thomas 1-yard run, Ramon Villela kick (Drive: 4 plays, 16 yards, 1:28; Boise State 14-10)
- (7:40) BOIS - Latrell Caples 7-yard pass from Maddux Madsen, Colton Boomer kick (Drive: 4 plays, 76 yards, 1:47; Boise State 21-10)
- (5:09) UNLV - Jaden Bradley 35-yard pass from Anthony Colandrea, Roman Villela kick (Drive: 6 plays, 75 yards, 2:31; Boise State 21-17)
- (4:24) BOIS - Dylan Riley 49-yard run, Colton Boomer kick (Drive: 2 plays, 75 yards, 0:45; Boise State 28-17)
- (0:43) UNLV - Anthony Colandrea 8-yard run, Ramon Villela kick (Drive: 5 plays, 67 yards, 0:30; Boise State 28-24)

Third quarter

- (9:38) BOIS - Sire Gaines 20-yard pass from Maddux Madsen, Colton Boomer kick (Drive: 3 plays, 68 yards, 1:04; Boise State 35-24)
- (2:21) BOIS - Chris Marshall 32-yard pass from Maddux Madsen, Colton Boomer kick (Drive: 6 plays, 88 yards, 3:27; Boise State 42-24)
- (0:54) BOIS - A'Marion McCoy 60-yard interception return, Colton Boomer kick (Boise State 49-24)

Fourth quarter

- (5:11) BOIS - Malik Sherrod 21-yard pass from Maddux Madsen, Colton Boomer kick (Drive: 12 plays, 82 yards, 7:52; Boise State 56-24)
- (2:45) UNLV - Troy Omeire 17-yard pass from Anthony Colandrea, Ramon Villela kick (Drive: 5 plays, 72 yards, 2:18; Boise State 56-31)

Statistics	UNLV	BOIS
First downs	22	21
Plays–yards	70–476	57–558
Rushes–yards	40–261	33–294
Passing yards	215	264
Passing: Comp–Att–Int	18–30–1	15–24–1
Turnovers	1	2
Time of possession	32:07	27:53

Team	Category	Player	Statistics
UNLV	Passing	Anthony Colandrea	18/30, 215 yards, 2 TD, INT
UNLV	Rushing	Jaylon Glover	6 carries, 112 yards
UNLV	Receiving	Deangelo Irvin Jr.	4 receptions, 90 yards
Boise State	Passing	Maddux Madsen	14/23, 253 yards, 4 TD, INT
Boise State	Rushing	Dylan Riley	15 carries, 201 yards, TD
Boise State	Receiving	Chris Marshall	3 receptions, 96 yards, TD

=== at Nevada (rivalry) ===
Boise State Broncos (5–2) at Nevada Wolf Pack (1–6) – Game summary

Quarter	1	2	3	4	Total
Broncos	3	7	7	7	24
Wolf Pack	3	0	0	0	3

at Mackay Stadium • Reno, NV

- Date: October 24
- Game time: 8:00 p.m. MDT
- Game weather: Cloudy • Temperature: 59 °F (15 °C) • Wind: SW 13 mph
- Game attendance: 18,029
- Referee: Cal McNeill
- TV announcers (CBSSN): Rich Waltz (play-by-play), Robert Turbin (analyst) and Jordan Giorgio (sideline)

Game information

First quarter

- (3:50) NEV – Joe McFadden 40-yard field goal (Drive: 12 plays, 57 yards, 7:16; Nevada 3–0)
- (0:00) BOIS – Colton Boomer 21-yard field goal (Drive: 13 plays, 73 yards, 3:50; Tied 3–3)

Second quarter

- (1:35) BOIS – Sire Gaines 2-yard run, Colton Boomer kick (Drive: 13 plays, 94 yards, 5:53; Boise State 10–3)

Third quarter

- (1:41) BOIS – Maddux Madsen 1-yard run, Colton Boomer kick (Drive: 4 plays, 6 yards, 2:08; Boise State 17–3)

Fourth quarter

- (3:09) BOIS – Dylan Riley 1-yard run, Colton Boomer kick (Drive: 15 plays, 80 yards, 8:18; Boise State 24–3)

Statistics	BOIS	NEV
First downs	21	15
Plays–yards	76–309	54–249
Rushes–yards	48–134	23–101
Passing yards	175	148
Passing: Comp–Att–Int	15–28–1	18–31–3
Turnovers	1	5
Time of possession	35:58	24:02

Team	Category	Player	Statistics
Boise State	Passing	Maddux Madsen	15/28, 175 yards, INT
Boise State	Rushing	Sire Gaines	17 carries, 61 yards, TD
Boise State	Receiving	Cameron Bates	1 reception, 37 yards
Nevada	Passing	Carter Jones	16/29, 145 yards, 3 INT
Nevada	Rushing	Herschel Turner	7 carries, 77 yards
Nevada	Receiving	Marshaun Brown	4 receptions, 35 yards

=== Fresno State (rivalry) ===
Fresno State Bulldogs (5–3) at Boise State Broncos (6–2) – Game summary

Quarter	1	2	3	4	Total
Bulldogs	7	3	14	6	30
Broncos	0	7	0	0	7

at Albertsons Stadium • Boise, ID

- Date: November 1
- Game time: 1:30 p.m. MDT
- Game weather: Sunny • Temperature: 66 °F (19 °C) • Wind: SE 10 mph
- Game attendance: 32,826
- Referee: Brad Carrell
- TV announcers (FS1): Noah Reed (play-by-play) and Robert Smith (analyst)

Game information

First quarter

- (2:28) FRES – Elijah Gilliam 1-yard run, Dylan Lynch kick (Drive: 9 plays, 55 yards, 4:16; Fresno State 7–0)

Second quarter

- (2:07) BOIS – Chase Penry 10-yard pass from Max Cutforth, Colton Boomer kick (Drive: 12 plays, 50 yards, 6:17; Tied 7–7)
- (0:05) FRES – Dylan Lynch 36-yard field goal (Drive: 6 plays, 28 yards, 1:23; Fresno State 10–7)

Third quarter

- (10:47) FRES – Brandon Ramirez 3-yard run, Dylan Lynch kick (Drive: 3 plays, 27 yards, 1:01; Fresno State 17–7)
- (4:30) FRES – Bryson Donelson 2-yard run, Dylan Lynch kick (Drive: 3 plays, 43 yards, 0:51; Fresno State 24–7)

Fourth quarter

- (10:35) FRES – Dylan Lynch 43-yard field goal (Drive: 15 plays, 50 yards, 8:08; Fresno State 27–7)
- (3:41) FRES – Dylan Lynch 33-yard field goal (Drive: 4 plays, 4 yards, 0:25; Fresno State 30–7)

Statistics	FRES	BOIS
First downs	15	11
Plays–yards	68–224	62–193
Rushes–yards	47–189	29–91
Passing yards	35	102
Passing: Comp–Att–Int	10–21–0	15–33–2
Turnovers	0	3
Time of possession	33:14	26:46

Team	Category	Player	Statistics
Fresno State	Passing	Carson Conklin	10/21, 35 yards
Fresno State	Rushing	Rayshon Luke	16 carries, 88 yards
Fresno State	Receiving	Josiah Freeman	5 receptions, 27 yards
Boise State	Passing	Max Cutforth	14/29, 106 yards, TD, 2 INT
Boise State	Rushing	Malik Sherrod	10 carries, 67 yards
Boise State	Receiving	Chase Penry	5 receptions, 44 yards, TD

=== at San Diego State ===
Boise State Broncos (6–3) at San Diego State Aztecs (7-2) – Game summary

Quarter	1	2	3	4	Total
Broncos	0	7	0	0	7
Aztecs	0	14	0	3	17

at Snapdragon Stadium • San Diego, CA

- Date: November 15
- Game time: 8:30 p.m. MST
- Game weather: Cloudy • Temperature: 62 °F (17 °C) • Wind: N 2 mph
- Game attendance: 29,201
- Referee: Kenneth Ray
- TV announcers (CBSSN): Rich Waltz (play-by-play), Robert Turbin (analyst) and Tiffany Blackmon (sideline)

Game information

First quarter

- No scoring plays.

Second quarter

- SDSU (13:15) – Jayden Denegal 1-yard run (Gabriel Plascencia kick); Drive: 6 plays, 80 yards, 3:01 (Aztecs 7–0)
- BOIS (5:29) – Dylan Riley 9-yard run (Colton Boomer kick); Drive: 14 plays, 75 yards, 7:46 (Tied 7–7)
- SDSU (1:10) – Jayden Denegal 8-yard run (Gabriel Plascencia kick); Drive: 11 plays, 71 yards, 4:13 (Aztecs 14–7)

Third quarter

- No scoring plays.

Fourth quarter

- SDSU (10:51) – Gabriel Plascencia 47-yard field goal; Drive: 9 plays, 39 yards, 5:25 (Aztecs 17–7)

Statistics	BOIS	SDSU
First downs	14	12
Plays–yards	59–268	56–294
Rushes–yards	41–170	46–277
Passing yards	104	17
Passing: Comp–Att–Int	12–18–0	6–10–0
Turnovers	0	0
Time of possession	31:05	28:55

Team	Category	Player	Statistics
Boise State	Passing	Max Cutforth	12/18, 104 yards
Boise State	Rushing	Dylan Riley	21 carries, 79 yards, TD
Boise State	Receiving	Chase Penry	3 receptions, 50 yards
San Diego State	Passing	Jayden Denegal	6/10, 17 yards
San Diego State	Rushing	Lucky Sutton	25 carries, 150 yards
San Diego State	Receiving	Mikey Welsh	3 receptions, 22 yards

=== Colorado State ===
Colorado State Rams (2-8) at Boise State Broncos (6-4) – Game summary

Quarter	1	2	3	4	Total
Rams	7	0	0	14	21
Broncos	7	20	7	15	49

at Albertsons Stadium • Boise, ID

- Date: November 22
- Game time: 5:00 p.m. MST
- Game weather: Sunny • Temperature: 52 °F (11 °C) • Wind: SE 3 mph
- Game attendance: 32,819
- Referee: Cal McNeill
- TV announcers (FS1): Chris Myers (play-by-play) and Spencer Tillman (analyst)

Game information

First quarter

- (8:55) BOIS - Sire Gaines 3-yard run, Colton Boomer kick (Drive: 14 plays, 79 yards, 6:01; Boise State 7-0)
- (5:27) CSU - Rocky Beers 3-yard pass from Darius Curry, Isaiah Hankins kick (Drive: 8 plays, 75 yards, 3:28; Tied 7-7)

Second quarter

- (11:32) BOIS - Malik Sherrod 1-yard run, Colton Boomer kick (Drive: 10 plays, 98 yards, 4:38; Boise State 14-7)
- (3:37) BOIS - Colton Boomer 27-yard field goal (Drive: 12 plays, 81 yards, 6:38; Boise State 17-7)
- (1:59) BOIS - Dylan Riley 2-yard run, Colton Boomer kick (Drive: 5 plays, 45 yards, 1:29; Boise State 24-7)
- (0:06) BOIS - Colton Boomer 32-yard field goal (Drive: 12 plays, 58 yards, 1:03; Boise State 27-7)

Third quarter

- (1:48) BOIS - Sire Gaines 8-yard run, Colton Boomer kick (Drive: 7 plays, 68 yards, 3:43; Boise State 34-7)

Fourth quarter

- (11:09) CSU - Lloyd Avant 4-yard run, Isaiah Hankins kick (Drive: 9 plays, 91 yards, 2:51; Boise State 34-14)
- (9:32) CSU - Tay Lanier 6-yard pass from Darius Curry, Isaiah Hankins kick (Drive: 5 plays, 49 yards, 1:36; Boise State 34-21)
- (5:48) BOIS - Malik Sherrod 24-yard run, Max Cutforth pass to Cameron Bates for two-point conversion (Drive: 6 plays, 27 yards, 3:43; Boise State 42-21)
- (2:29) BOIS - Seth Knothe 9-yard run, Colton Boomer kick (Drive: 5 plays, 25 yards, 2:53; Boise State 49-21)

Statistics	CSU	BOIS
First downs	17	32
Plays–yards	63–332	87–533
Rushes–yards	17–39	52–279
Passing yards	293	254
Passing: Comp–Att–Int	26-46-3	23-35-0
Turnovers	4	1
Time of possession	23:05	36:55

Team	Category	Player	Statistics
Colorado State	Passing	Darius Curry	26/46, 293 yards, 2 TD, 3 INT
Colorado State	Rushing	Darius Curry	6 carries, 23 yards
Colorado State	Receiving	Rocky Beers	7 receptions, 94 yards, TD
Boise State	Passing	Max Cutforth	22/34, 239 yards
Boise State	Rushing	Sire Gaines	22 carries, 149 yards, 2 TD
Boise State	Receiving	Latrell Caples	7 receptions, 70 yards

=== at Utah State ===
Boise State Broncos (7-4) at Utah State Aggies (6-5) – Game summary

Quarter	1	2	3	4	Total
Broncos	10	3	6	6	25
Aggies	14	7	3	0	24

at Maverik Stadium • Logan, UT

- Date: November 28
- Game time: 2:00 p.m. MST
- Game weather: Cloudy • Temperature: 45 °F (7 °C)
- Game attendance: 21,155
- Referee: Christian Watson
- TV announcers (CBS): Chris Lewis (play-by-play), Logan Ryan (analyst) and Brandon Baylor (sideline)

Game information

First quarter

- (12:29) USU - Bryson Barnes 1-yard run, Tanner Rinker kick (Drive: 7 plays, 75 yards, 2:31; Utah State 7-0)
- (7:58) BOIS - Colton Boomer 27-yard field goal (Drive: 8 plays, 13 yards, 2:53; Utah State 7-3)
- (5:07) BOIS - Matt Wagner 11-yard pass from Max Cutforth, Colton Boomer kick (Drive: 4 plays, 46 yards, 1:57; Boise State 10-7)
- (4:05) USU - Javen Jacobs 56-yard run, Tanner Rinker kick (Drive: 3 plays, 75 yards, 1:02; Utah State 14-10)

Second quarter

- (1:55) USU - Miles Davis 11-yard run, Tanner Rinker kick (Drive: 9 plays, 74 yards, 2:21; Utah State 21-10)
- (0:12) BOIS - Colton Boomer 32-yard field goal (Drive: 14 plays, 60 yards, 1:43; Utah State 21-13)

Third quarter

- (4:09) USU - Tanner Rinker 37-yard field goal (Drive: 10 plays, 51 yards, 3:23; Utah State 24-13)
- (3:17) BOIS - Quinton Brown 66-yard pass from Max Cutforth, two-point pass conversion failed (Drive: 2 plays, 75 yards, 0:44; Utah State 24-19)

Fourth quarter

- (2:26) BOIS - Dylan Riley 6-yard run, two-point pass conversion failed (Drive: 7 plays, 41 yards, 2:56; Boise State 25-24')

Statistics	BOIS	USU
First downs	28	22
Plays–yards	95–512	66–405
Rushes–yards	46–171	34–221
Passing yards	341	184
Passing: Comp–Att–Int	26-49-0	13-32-0
Turnovers	1	1
Time of possession	36:58	23:02

Team	Category	Player	Statistics
Boise State	Passing	Max Cutforth	26/49, 341 yards, 2 TD
Boise State	Rushing	Dylan Riley	25 carries, 120 yards, TD
Boise State	Receiving	Matt Wagner	5 receptions, 69 yards, TD
Utah State	Passing	Bryson Barnes	13/31, 184 yards
Utah State	Rushing	Javen Jacobs	5 carries, 92 yards, TD
Utah State	Receiving	Anthony Garcia	2 receptions, 54 yards

=== UNLV (Mountain West Championship Game) ===
2025 Mountain West Championship Game
UNLV Rebels (10–2) at Boise State Broncos (8–4) – Game summary

Quarter	1	2	3	4	Total
Rebels	0	14	7	0	21
Broncos	14	14	0	10	38

at Albertsons Stadium • Boise, ID

- Date: Friday, December 5, 2025
- Game time: 6:00 p.m. MT
- Game weather: Temperature: 43°
- Game attendance: 27,152
- Referee: Patrick Foy
- TV announcers (FOX): Jason Benetti, Robert Griffin III, and Alexa Landestoy

Game information

First quarter

- BOIS – Maddux Madsen 10-yard run (Colton Boomer kick), 6:40. Broncos 7–0. Drive: 5 plays, 51 yards, 2:48.
- BOIS – Dylan Riley 9-yard pass from Maddux Madsen (Colton Boomer kick), 0:18. Broncos 14–0. Drive: 5 plays, 67 yards, 2:17.

Second quarter

- BOIS – Cameron Bates 7-yard pass from Maddux Madsen (Colton Boomer kick), 8:42. Broncos 21–0. Drive: 12 plays, 67 yards, 5:36.
- UNLV – Anthony Colandrea 5-yard run (Ramon Villela kick), 3:08. Broncos 21–7. Drive: 9 plays, 95 yards, 3:46.
- BOIS – Malik Sherrod 39-yard pass from Maddux Madsen (Colton Boomer kick), 1:50. Broncos 28–7. Drive: 3 plays, 5 yards, 1:12.
- UNLV – Troy Omeire 11-yard pass from Anthony Colandrea (Ramon Villela kick), 0:48. Broncos 28–14. Drive: 6 plays, 75 yards, 1:01.

Third quarter

- UNLV – JoJo Earle 7-yard run (Ramon Villela kick), 2:59. Broncos 28–21. Drive: 9 plays, 78 yards, 2:55.

Fourth quarter

- BOIS – Sire Gaines 1-yard run (Colton Boomer kick), 13:21. Broncos 35–21. Drive: 10 plays, 78 yards, 4:31.
- BOIS – Colton Boomer 50-yard field goal, 3:13. Broncos 38–21. Drive: 8 plays, 52 yards, 4:05.

Statistics	UNLV	BOIS
First downs	22	23
Plays–yards	72–409	69–460
Rushes–yards	34–184	38–171
Passing yards	225	289
Passing: Comp–Att–Int	18–38–0	17–31–0
Turnovers	1	0
Time of possession	28:40	31:20

Team	Category	Player	Statistics
UNLV	Passing	Anthony Colandrea	18/38, 225 yards, TD
UNLV	Rushing	Anthony Colandrea	12 carries, 66 yards, TD
UNLV	Receiving	JoJo Earle	2 receptions, 45 yards
Boise State	Passing	Maddux Madsen	17/31, 289 yards, 3 TD
Boise State	Rushing	Dylan Riley	21 carries, 75 yards
Boise State	Receiving	Chase Penry	3 receptions, 96 yards

=== vs. Washington (LA Bowl) ===
2025 Bucked Up LA Bowl Hosted by Gronk
Boise State Broncos (9-4) vs Washington Huskies (8-4) – Game summary

Quarter	1	2	3	4	Total
Broncos	3	0	0	7	10
Huskies	3	21	7	7	38

at SoFi Stadium • Inglewood, CA

- Date: December 13
- Game time: 6:00 p.m. MST
- Game weather: Clear • Temperature: 59 °F (15 °C)
- Game attendance: 23,269
- Referee: Edwin Lee
- TV announcers (ABC/ESPN Radio): ABC: Dave Pasch (play-by-play), Dusty Dvoracek (analyst), and Taylor McGregor (sideline reporter)
  ESPN Radio: Mike Couzens (play-by-play) and Max Browne (analyst)

Game information

First quarter

- (11:35) BOIS - Colton Boomer 52-yard field goal (Drive: 6 plays, 21 yards, 3:16; Boise State 3-0)
- (4:20) WASH - Grady Gross 33-yard field goal (Drive: 15 plays, 60 yards, 7:15; Tied 3-3)

Second quarter

- (9:54) WASH - Denzel Boston 78-yard pass from Demond Williams Jr., Grady Gross kick (Drive: 2 plays, 82 yards, 0:52; Washington 10-3)
- (1:56) WASH - Dezmen Roebuck 6-yard pass from Demond Williams Jr., Grady Gross kick (Drive: 7 plays, 57 yards, 3:03; Washington 17-3)
- (1:17) WASH - Raiden Vines-Bright 3-yard pass from Demond Williams Jr., Grady Gross kick (Drive: 3 plays, 35 yards, 0:22; Washington 24-3)

Third quarter

- (12:05) WASH - Quentin Moore 32-yard pass from Demond Williams Jr., Grady Gross kick (Drive: 6 plays, 70 yards, 2:47; Washington 31-3)

Fourth quarter

- (10:46) WASH - Jonah Coleman 6-yard run, Grady Gross kick (Drive: 3 plays, 9 yards, 0:49; Washington 38-3)
- (1:18) BOIS - Matt Lauter 8-yard pass from Max Cutforth, Colton Boomer kick (Drive: 13 plays, 94 yards, 5:01; Washington 38-10)

Statistics	BOIS	WASH
First downs	16	17
Plays–yards	72–311	61–355
Rushes–yards	28–58	34–127
Passing yards	253	228
Passing: comp–att–int	22–43–5	17–28–0
Turnovers	5	1
Time of possession	32:06	28:04

Team	Category	Player	Statistics
Boise State	Passing	Max Cutforth	15/27, 302 yards, TD, 3 INT
Boise State	Rushing	Dylan Riley	10 carries, 34 yards
Boise State	Receiving	Chris Marshall	5 receptions, 97 yards
Washington	Passing	Demond Williams Jr.	15/24, 215 yards, 4 TD
Washington	Rushing	Jonah Coleman	12 carries, 85 yards, TD
Washington	Receiving	Denzel Boston	6 receptions, 126 yards, TD

== Roster ==
2025 Boise State Broncos football team roster
Players
Coaches
Offense

Pos.	#	Name	Class
RB	1	Jambres Dubar	Jr
WR	3	Latrell Caples	GS
QB	4	Maddux Madsen	Jr
WR	5	Chris Marshall	Jr
WR	13	Chase Penry	Sr
QB	14	Max Cutforth	So
QB	15	Zeke Martinez	Fr
QB	16	Kaleb Annett	Fr
WR	17	Demetric Whitlock Jr.	Jr
RB	23	Malik Sherrod	GS
RB	24	Dylan Riley	So
WR	25	Quinton Brown	Fr
RB	26	Sire Gaines	Fr
WR	27	Kayden Chan	Jr
RB	28	Seth Knothe	Jr
WR	29	AJ Jones	Fr
RB	34	Greg Ard	Fr
TE	45	Troy Grizzle	Fr
TE	46	Carter Kuchenbuch	Fr
TE	47	Kaden Anderson	Fr
WR	49	A. J. Maes	So
OL	52	Stewart Taufa	Fr
OL	59	Jameson Perry	Fr
OL	61	J. J. Talo	Jr
OL	62	Roger Carreon	Jr
OL	63	Mason Randolph	Sr
OL	64	Carson Rasmussen	So
OT	65	Hall Schmidt	Jr
OL	66	Jacob Tracy	Fr
OL	67	Jason Steele	So
OL	68	Jake Steele	Jr
OL	69	Tayo Omotinugbon	Fr
OT	70	Kyle Cox	So
OL	71	Miles Walker	So
OL	72	Zach Holmes	Sr
OL	73	Parker Perkins	Fr
OL	74	Alma Taleni	Fr
OL	75	Daylon Metoyer	Jr
OL	76	Greg Bienvenue	Fr
OT	77	Kage Casey	Jr
OL	78	Tyler Keinath	Sr
OL	79	Connor Warkentin	Fr
WR	80	Cameron Bates	So
WR	81	Kamryn Jones	Fr
WR	82	Ben Ford	Sr
WR	83	Qumonte Williams Jr.	Fr
WR	84	Gavin Packer	Fr
TE	85	Matt Lauter	Sr
TE	86	Austin Terry	Jr
TE	87	Mitch Bothwell	Sr
TE	88	Matt Wagner	So
WR	89	Kobe Young	Sr
TE	96	Luke Voorhees	Sr

Defense

Pos.	#	Name	Class
S	0	Ty Benefield	Jr
DB	4	Davon Banks	Sr
EDGE	5	Jayden Virgin-Morgan	Jr
DB	6	Jeremiah Earby	Sr
DB	7	A'Marion McCoy	GS
DB	10	Derek Ganter Jr.	So
EDGE	13	Sterling Lane II	Jr
DB	14	Demetrius Freeney	Jr
EDGE	15	Malakai Williams	Sr
DB	16	Franklyn Johnson Jr.	So
LB	17	Clay Martineau	So
DB	18	Samuel Brooks	Jr
DL	19	Dion Washington	Sr
DB	20	Jaden Mickey	Jr
S	21	Zion Washington	Sr
LB	22	Chase Martin	Jr
DB	23	Sherrod Smith	So
DB	25	Jaylen Webb	Jr
DB	29	Arthur de Boachie	Fr
DB	31	Cole Miller	So
DB	32	Ja'Bree Bickham	Fr
DB	33	Josiah Alanis	Fr
DB	34	Dominik Calhoun	Fr
DB	35	Treyvon Tolmaire	Fr
DB	36	Tahj Crutchfield	Fr
DB	38	Travis Anderson	Fr
DB	39	Timothy Mitchell	Fr
EDGE	40	De'Shawn Toilolo	Fr
LB	41	Boen Phelps	So
LB	43	Jake Ripp	Jr
LB	44	Syncere Brackett	Fr
EDGE	45	Markell Bowens	Fr
EDGE	50	Jaden Williams	Fr
EDGE	51	Roman Caywood	Fr
LB	53	Marco Notarainni	Sr
LB	55	Mana Tuioti	Fr
EDGE	56	Mason Jacobsen	Jr
DT	58	Trevor McKenna	Fr
DL	59	Lopez Sanusi	Fr
DT	60	Spencer Gieg	Jr
DT	90	Braxton Fely	Sr
EDGE	91	Bol Bol	Fr
DL	92	David Latu	Jr
DL	93	Ryder Swanson	Fr
DL	94	Keanu Mailoto	Sr
DL	95	Max Stege	Jr
DL	97	Hayden Hanks	Fr
DL	98	Bethel Imasuen	Fr
DT	99	Michael Madrie	So

Special teams

Pos.	#	Name	Class
K/P	30	Jarrett Reeser	Jr
K	35	Colton Boomer	Jr
P	37	Oscar Doyle	Jr
LS	42	Mason Hutton	Sr
K	48	Canaan Moore	Fr
LS	54	Hunter Higham	So

Head coach

- Spencer Danielson

Coordinators/assistant coaches

- Stacy Collins – Assistant head coach/special teams coordinator/linebackers
- Erik Chinander – Defensive coordinator/defensive linemen
- Nate Potter – Offensive coordinator/tight ends
- Matt Miller – Co-offensive coordinator/wide receivers
- Tyler Stockton – Co-defensive coordinator/safeties
- Zak Hill – Passing game coordinator/quarterbacks
- Tim Keane – Run game coordinator/offensive linemen
- Jabril Frazier – Edge rushers
- James Montgomery – Running backs
- Demario Warren – Cornerbacks
- George Hicks – Assistant wide receivers
- D. J. Killings – Assistant secondary
- Frank Maile – Assistant defensive line
- Danny McDonald – Assistant tight ends
- Derrick McMahen - Assistant special teams coordinator/assistant secondary
- B. J. Mullin - Assistant defensive backs
- Tyler Rausa – Specialists/external relations coordinator
- Kooper Richardson – Assistant offensive linemen
- Demitri Washington – Assistant edge rushers
- Justin Udy – Assistant quarterbacks
- Matt Fleischacker – Assistant linebackers
- Dirk Koetter – Senior analyst
- Benjamin Hilgart – Director, strength and conditioning
- Jaylan Reid – Associate director, strength and conditioning
- Marques White – Assistant director, strength and conditioning
- Collin McKelvey – Assistant director, strength and conditioning

Legend

- (C) Team captain
- (S) Suspended
- (I) Ineligible
- Injured
- Redshirt

Roster
Last update: 07/29/25
