= 2025 Mountain West Conference Football Championship Game =

- Conference Championship
UNLV Rebels	Boise State Broncos
(10–2)	(8–4)
21	38
Head coach: Dan Mullen	Head coach: Spencer Danielson
	1	2	3	4	Total
UNLV	0	14	7	0	21
Boise State	14	14	0	10	38
- Date: December 5, 2025
- Season: 2025
- Stadium: Albertsons Stadium
- Location: Boise, Idaho
- Favorite: Boise State by 5.5
- Referee: Patrick Foy

United States TV coverage
- Network: Fox
- Announcers: Jason Benetti, Robert Griffin III, and Alexa Landestoy

2025 Mountain West Conference football standings
	Conf.			Overall
Team	W		L	W		L
Boise State y$	6	–	2	9	–	5
UNLV y	6	–	2	10	–	4
San Diego State	6	–	2	9	–	4
New Mexico	6	–	2	9	–	4
Fresno State	5	–	3	9	–	4
Hawaii	5	–	3	9	–	4
Utah State	4	–	4	6	–	7
Air Force	3	–	5	4	–	8
Nevada	2	–	6	3	–	9
Wyoming	2	–	6	4	–	8
San Jose State	2	–	6	3	–	9
Colorado State	1	–	7	2	–	10
Championship: Boise State 38, UNLV 21
$ – Conference champion; y – Championship game participant; Rankings from CFP Rankings

The 2025 Mountain West Conference Football Championship Game was a college football game played on December 5, 2025, at Albertsons Stadium in Boise, Idaho. It was the 13th edition of the Mountain West Conference Football Championship Game and determined the champion of the Mountain West Conference (MW) for the 2025 season. The game began at 6:00 p.m. MT and aired on Fox. The game featured the Boise State Broncos and the UNLV Rebels in a rematch of the previous season's championship game.

== Teams ==
This was the 16th meeting between UNLV and Boise State; the Broncos led the all-time series 12–3. The game was a rematch of a regular-season game on October 18, in which Boise State defeated UNLV, 56–31.

Due to a four-way tie between Boise State, UNLV, New Mexico, and San Diego State for best conference record, the participants in the Mountain West Championship game were determined by computer metrics using a composite average of metrics from Connelly SP+, ESPN SOR, KPI and SportSource rankings. UNLV and Boise State had the highest averages of 45.50 and 47.75, respectively. Boise State was selected as the host team due to their victory in the October 18 regular season matchup.

=== Boise State Broncos ===
The Broncos entered the game with an 8–4 record, 6–2 in conference play. They will make their fourth consecutive Mountain West title game appearance and ninth overall. They are 5–3 in previous appearances, having last won the title a year ago.

=== UNLV Rebels ===
The Rebels entered the game with a 10–2 record, 6–2 in conference play. They are making their third consecutive Mountain West and third overall title game appearance, having lost the title a year ago to the Broncos.

== Scoring summary ==
2025 Mountain West Championship
UNLV Rebels (10–2, 6–2) vs. Boise State (8–4, 6–2)

Quarter	1	2	3	4	Total
UNLV	0	14	7	0	21
Boise State	14	14	0	10	38

at Albertsons Stadium • Boise, ID

- Date: Friday, December 5, 2025
- Game time: 6:00 p.m. MT
- Game weather: Temperature: 43°
- TV announcers (FOX): Jason Benetti, Robert Griffin III, and Alexa Landestoy

Game information

First Quarter
Second Quarter
Third Quarter
Fourth Quarter

Statistics	UNLV	BSU
First downs	22	23
Plays–yards	409	460
Rushes–yards	34-184	38-171
Passing yards	225	289
Passing: comp–att–int	18-38-0	17-31-0
Time of possession	28:40	31:20

Team	Category	Player	Statistics
UNLV	Passing	Anthony Colandrea	18/38, 225 yards, 1 TD
UNLV	Rushing	Anthony Colandrea	12 carries, 66 yards, 1 TD
UNLV	Receiving	JoJo Earle	2 receptions, 45 yards
Boise State	Passing	Maddux Madsen	17/31, 289 yards, 3 TD
Boise State	Rushing	Dylan Riley	21 carries, 75 yards
Boise State	Receiving	Chase Penry	3 receptions, 96 yards
