= Liam Szarka =

American football player

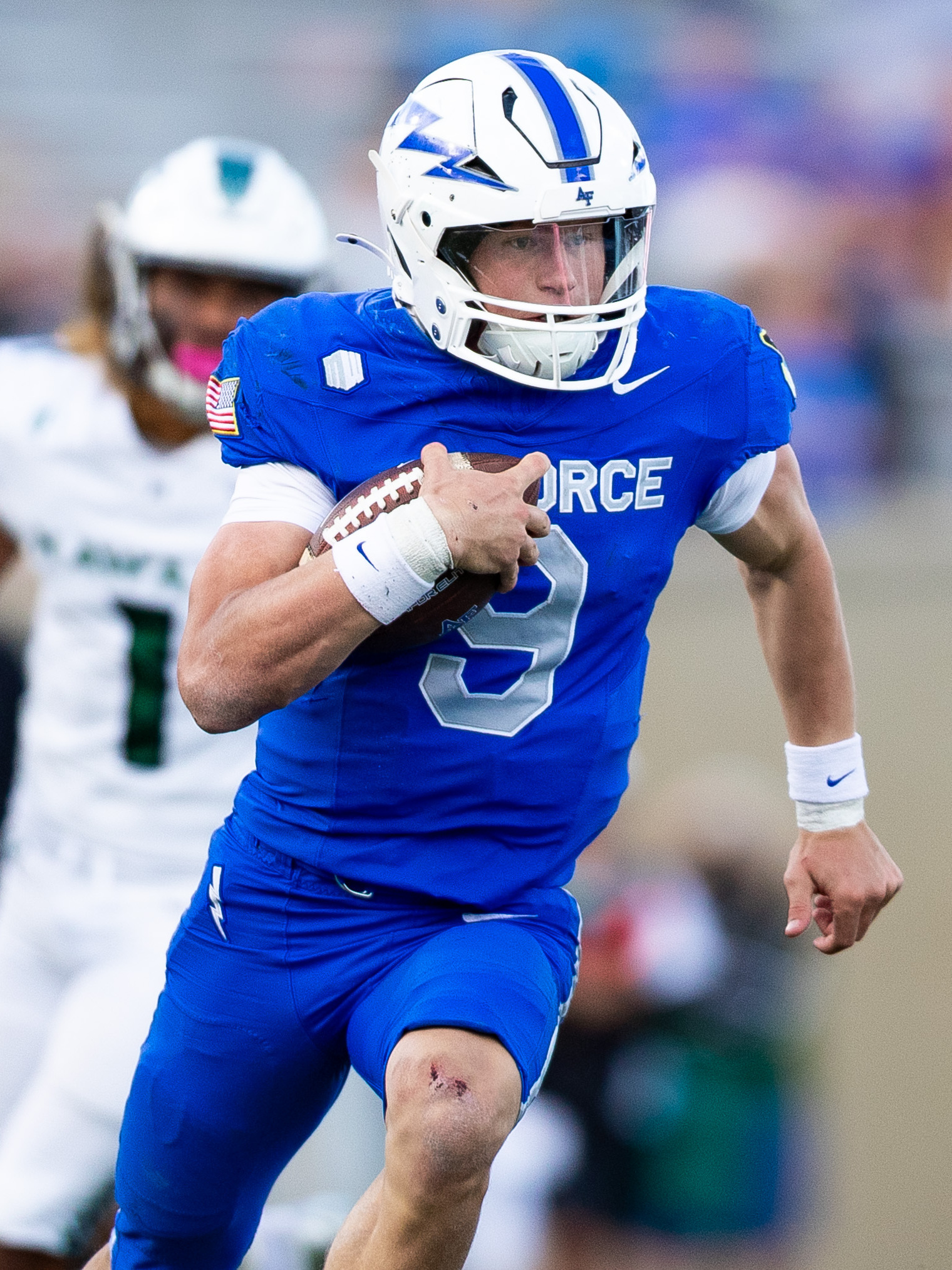
- Szarka with Air Force in 2025

No. 9 – Air Force Falcons
- Position: Quarterback
- Class: Junior

Personal information
- Listed height: 5 ft 11 in (1.80 m)
- Listed weight: 190 lb (86 kg)

Career information
- High school: Grandview (Aurora, Colorado)
- College: Air Force (2024–present)
- Stats at ESPN

Liam Szarka is an American football quarterback for the Air Force Falcons.

== Early life ==
Szarka attended Grandview High School in Aurora, Colorado, and committed to play college football for the Air Force Falcons over offers from Harvard and Penn.

== College career ==
As a freshman in 2024, Szarka did not appear in any games. He entered the 2025 season as the backup quarterback to Josh Johnson. In week 4, Szarka went 13 for 18 on his passes for 246 yards and two touchdowns, while also rushing for 110 yards and a touchdown on 20 carries in a loss against Boise State. He made his first career start in week 5 of the 2025 season, where he completed 10 of 12 pass attempts for 278 yards and three touchdowns, while also adding 139 yards on 17 carries in a loss to Hawaii. Szarka was subsequently named the team's starting quarterback for the remainder of the season. He made seven starts before suffering a season-ending injury against UConn, finishing the season throwing for 1,294 yards with nine touchdowns and five interceptions, while also adding 922 yards and 13 touchdowns on the ground.

=== Statistics ===
Year	Team	Games			Passing								Rushing			
Year	Team	GP	GS	Record	Cmp	Att	Pct	Yds	Y/A	TD	Int	Rtg	Att	Yds	Avg	TD
2024	Air Force	0	0	—	DNP											
2025	Air Force	10	7	2–5	75	120	62.5	1,294	10.8	9	5	169.5	190	922	4.9	13
2026	Air Force	4	4	3–1	19	38	50.0	296	7.8	1	4	103.2	92	391	4.3	7
Career		14	11	5–6	94	158	59.5	1,590	10.1	10	9	153.5	282	1,313	4.7	20
