= Art of Sport =

American personal care company

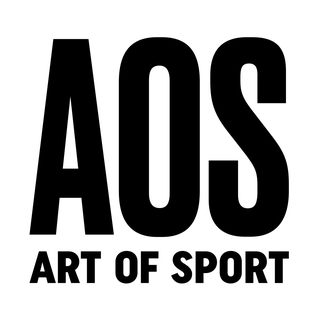
- Type: Private
- Industry: Personal care
- Founded: 2018
- Founders: Matthias Metternich (CEO); Brian Lee; Kobe Bryant
- Headquarters: Los Angeles, U.S.
- Products: Soap; lotion; sunscreen; deodorant; body wash
- Website: artofsport.com

Art of Sport is an American personal care company that produces a unisex line of body and skin care products marketed toward athletes. Its products include soaps, lotions, body washes, deodorants, and other personal care items. The company launched as a direct-to-consumer brand selling its products on its website and Amazon. In 2019, Art of Sport launched its products at offline stores in partnership with Target. The partnership represented the largest men's skin care partnership in Target's history. In 2020, the brand extended to CVS, Walgreens, Kroger, HEB, Meijer, Dicks and Military stores, bringing Art of Sport to over 25,000 retail locations.

The company was founded in 2018 by Matthias Metternich, Brian Lee, and Kobe Bryant.

For a year prior to the company's launch, a team of scientists developed the products using predominately natural ingredients. The company was founded in Los Angeles by Metternich, Brian Lee, and Kobe Bryant, with Metternich as CEO. Art of Sport's first products were released in October 2018. In addition to Bryant, the brand is represented by several notable athletes including Javier Baez, JuJu Smith-Schuster, James Harden, Sage Erickson, Ryan Sheckler, and Ken Roczen.

Art of Sport releases a line of personal care products marketed toward athletes. Its items include soaps, creams, lotions, body washes, deodorants, and sunscreens (among others). The products use a variety of natural ingredients.

In September 2022, Art of Sport was acquired by Starco Brands. In 2024, Starco won the naming rights to the college football bowl game the LA Bowl and renamed it the Art of Sport LA Bowl.
