= 2025 Air Force Falcons football team =

American college football season

2025 Air Force Falcons football
- Conference: Mountain West Conference
- Record: 4–8 (3–5 MW)
- Head coach: Troy Calhoun (19th season)
- Offensive coordinator: Mike Thiessen (17th season)
- Offensive scheme: Triple option
- Defensive coordinator: Brian Knorr (4th season)
- Base defense: 3–4
- Home stadium: Falcon Stadium

Uniform
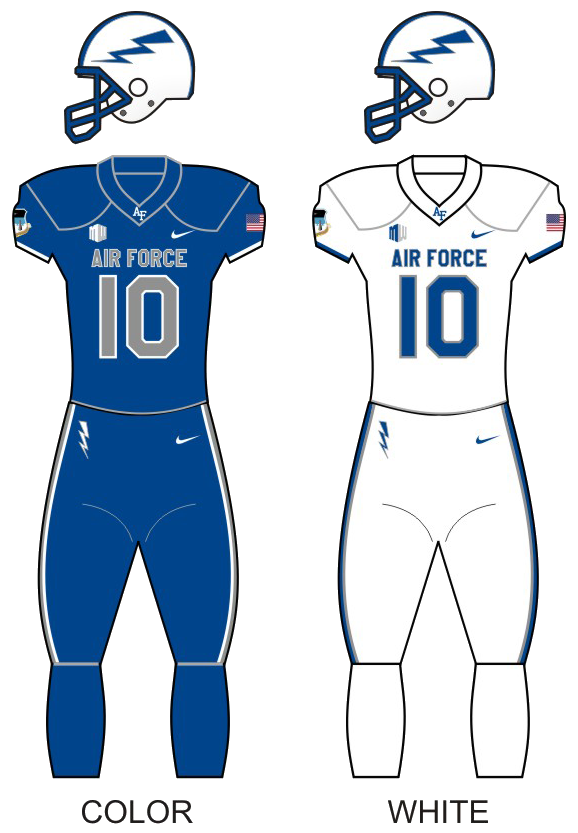

2025 Mountain West Conference football standings
	Conf.			Overall
Team	W		L	W		L
Boise State y$	6	–	2	9	–	5
UNLV y	6	–	2	10	–	4
San Diego State	6	–	2	9	–	4
New Mexico	6	–	2	9	–	4
Fresno State	5	–	3	9	–	4
Hawaii	5	–	3	9	–	4
Utah State	4	–	4	6	–	7
Air Force	3	–	5	4	–	8
Nevada	2	–	6	3	–	9
Wyoming	2	–	6	4	–	8
San Jose State	2	–	6	3	–	9
Colorado State	1	–	7	2	–	10
Championship: Boise State 38, UNLV 21
$ – Conference champion; y – Championship game participant; Rankings from CFP Rankings

The 2025 Air Force Falcons football team represented the United States Air Force Academy during the 2025 NCAA Division I FBS football season as a member of the Mountain West Conference. The team played their home games at Falcon Stadium and were led by 19th-year head coach Troy Calhoun.

== Preseason ==
=== Mountain West media poll ===
The Mountain West's preseason prediction poll was released on July 16, 2025.

Mountain West media poll
Predicted finish	Team	Votes (1st place)
1	Boise State	464 (35)
2	UNLV	415 (4)
3	San Jose State	359
4	Colorado State	326
5	Fresno State	301
6	Air Force	280
7	Hawaii	213
8	San Diego State	202
9	Utah State	165
10	Wyoming	150
11	New Mexico	84
12	Nevada	83

== Schedule ==
Date	Time	Opponent	Site	TV	Result	Attendance
August 30	1:30 p.m.	Bucknell*	Falcon Stadium; USAF Academy, CO	CBSSN	W 49–13	30,207
September 13	9:45 p.m.	at Utah State	Maverik Stadium; Logan, UT	FS1	L 30–49	17,124
September 20	5:00 p.m.	Boise State	Falcon Stadium; USAF Academy, CO	CBSSN	L 37–49	24,046
September 27	2:00 p.m.	Hawaii	Falcon Stadium; USAF Academy, CO (rivalry)	FS1	L 35–44	22,677
October 4	10:00 a.m.	at Navy*	Navy–Marine Corps Memorial Stadium; Annapolis, MD (Commander-in-Chief's Trophy)	CBS	L 31–34	37,517
October 11	1:30 p.m.	at UNLV	Allegiant Stadium; Paradise, NV	CBSSN	L 48–51	32,932
October 18	1:30 p.m.	Wyoming	Falcon Stadium; USAF Academy, CO	CBSSN	W 24–21	23,401
November 1	10:00 a.m.	Army*	Falcon Stadium; USAF Academy, CO (Commander-in-Chief's Trophy)	CBS	L 17–20	39,441
November 8	4:00 p.m.	at San Jose State	CEFCU Stadium; San Jose, CA	FS1	W 26–16	13,637
November 15	10:00 a.m.	at UConn*	Pratt & Whitney Stadium at Rentschler Field; East Hartford, CT	CBSSN	L 16–26	31,457
November 22	5:00 p.m.	New Mexico	Falcon Stadium; USAF Academy, CO	CBSSN	L 3–20	20,218
November 28	1:00 p.m.	at Colorado State	Canvas Stadium; Fort Collins, CO (rivalry)	FS1	W 42–21	25,873
*Non-conference game; All times are in Mountain time

== Game summaries ==
=== Bucknell ===
Bucknell Bison (0–0) at Air Force Falcons (0–0) – Game summary

Quarter	1	2	3	4	Total
Bison	0	7	3	3	13
Falcons	14	14	14	7	49

at Falcon Stadium • Air Force Academy, Colorado

- Date: August 30
- Game time: 1:30 p.m. MDT
- Game weather: Sunny
- Game attendance: 30,207
- Referee: Gary Reed
- TV announcers (CBSSN): Jordan Kent and Ben DiNucci
- Box score, Recap

Game information

First quarter

- AFA – Quin Smith 40-yard pass from Josh Johnson (Jacob Medina kick), 6:22. Falcons 7–0. Drive: 6 plays, 80 yards, 2:47.
- AFA – Cade Harris 9-yard run (Jacob Medina kick), 2:28. Falcons 14–0. Drive: 5 plays, 61 yards, 2:25.

Second quarter

- BUCK – Sam Milligan 12-yard pass from Ralph Rucker IV (Matt Schearer kick), 12:54. Falcons 14–7. Drive: 11 plays, 75 yards, 4:34.
- AFA – Dylan Carson 2-yard run (Jacob Medina kick), 7:14. Falcons 21–7. Drive: 11 plays, 75 yards, 5:40.;
- AFA – Cade Harris 62-yard pass from Josh Johnson (Jacob Medina kick), 4:41. Falcons 28–7. Drive: 1 play, 62 yards, 0:09.

Third quarter

- AFA – Korey Johnson 0-yard fumble return (Jacob Medina kick), 13:04. Falcons 35–7.
- AFA – Cade Harris 8-yard run (Jacob Medina kick), 11:34. Falcons 42–7. Drive: 1 play, 8 yards, 0:06.
- BUCK – Matt Schearer 37-yard field goal, 5:49. Falcons 42–10. Drive: 12 plays, 55 yards, 5:45.

Fourth quarter

- AFA – Maguire Martin 1-yard run (Reagan Tubbs kick), 6:24. Falcons 49–10. Drive: 17 plays, 75 yards, 14:25.
- BUCK – Matt Schearer 39-yard field goal, 0:44. Falcons 49–13. Drive: 13 plays, 53 yards, 5:40.

Statistics	BUCK	AFA
First downs	18	23
Plays–yards	62–266	60–429
Rushes–yards	38–97	51–270
Passing yards	169	159
Passing: Comp–Att–Int	16–24–1	6–9–0
Turnovers	2	0
Time of possession	28:22	31:38

Team	Category	Player	Statistics
Bucknell	Passing	Ralph Rucker IV	10/18, 126 yards, TD, INT
Bucknell	Rushing	Tariq Thomas	18 carries, 80 yards
Bucknell	Receiving	Sam Milligan	2 receptions, 41 yards, TD
Air Force	Passing	Josh Johnson	4/7, 112 yards, 2 TD
Air Force	Rushing	Cade Harris	8 carries, 66 yards, 2 TD
Air Force	Receiving	Cade Harris	3 receptions, 83 yards, TD

=== at Utah State ===
Air Force Falcons (1–0) at Utah State Aggies (1–1) – Game summary

Quarter	1	2	3	4	Total
Falcons	0	10	6	14	30
Aggies	7	7	21	14	49

at Maverik Stadium • Logan, Utah

- Date: September 13
- Game time: 9:45 p.m. MDT
- Game weather: Sunny
- Game attendance: 17,124
- Referee: Gary Reed
- TV announcers (FS1): Trent Rush (play-by-play) and Petros Papadakis (analyst)
- Box score, Recap

Game information

First quarter

- (10:04) USU – Bryson Barnes 7-yard run, Tanner Rinker kick (Drive: 5 plays, 27 yards, 2:23; Utah State 7–0)

Second quarter

- (14:46) AFA – Jacob Medina 31-yard field goal (Drive: 12 plays, 39 yards, 5:38; Utah State 7–3)
- (13:02) USU – Braden Pegan 54-yard pass from Bryson Barnes, Tanner Rinker kick (Drive: 6 plays, 88 yards, 1:44; Utah State 14–3)
- (9:04) AFA – Liam Szarka 1-yard run, Jacob Medina kick (Drive: 8 plays, 75 yards, 3:59; Utah State 14–10)

Third quarter

- (12:36) USU – Anthony Garcia 17-yard run, Tanner Rinker kick (Drive: 6 plays, 75 yards, 2:24; Utah State 21–10)
- (9:19) USU – Bryson Barnes 11-yard run, Tanner Rinker kick (Drive: 5 plays, 73 yards, 1:49; Utah State 28–10)
- (2:21) AFA – Owen Allen 1-yard run (Drive: 13 plays, 75 yards, 6:58; Utah State 28–16)
- (0:25) USU – Braden Pegan 38-yard pass from Bryson Barnes, Tanner Rinker kick (Drive: 5 plays, 75 yards, 1:56; Utah State 35–16)

Fourth quarter

- (12:30) AFA – Liam Szarka 1-yard run, Cade Harris rush (Drive: 6 plays, 75 yards, 2:55; Utah State 35–24)
- (3:58) USU – Bryson Barnes 7-yard run, Tanner Rinker kick (Drive: 7 plays, 33 yards, 2:41; Utah State 42–24)
- (1:34) AFA – Liam Szarka 11-yard run (Drive: 8 plays, 75 yards, 2:19; Utah State 42–30)
- (1:20) USU – Javen Jacobs 52-yard run, Tanner Rinker kick (Drive: 2 plays, 52 yards, 0:14; Utah State 49–30)

Statistics	AFA	USU
First downs	23	22
Plays–yards	84–445	56–473
Rushes–yards	61–266	34–186
Passing yards	179	287
Passing: Comp–Att–Int	11–23–2	17–22–0
Turnovers	3	0
Time of possession	38:11	21:49

Team	Category	Player	Statistics
Air Force	Passing	Josh Johnson	5/9, 112 yards, INT
Air Force	Rushing	Cade Harris	8 carries, 72 yards
Air Force	Receiving	Cade Harris	2 receptions, 63 yards
Utah State	Passing	Bryson Barnes	17/22, 287 yards, 2 TD
Utah State	Rushing	Javen Jacobs	9 carries, 71 yards, TD
Utah State	Receiving	Braden Pegan	7 receptions, 147 yards, 2 TD

=== Boise State ===
Boise State Broncos (1–1) at Air Force Falcons (1–1) – Game summary

Quarter	1	2	3	4	Total
Broncos	14	7	14	14	49
Falcons	7	7	10	13	37

at Falcon Stadium • Air Force Academy, Colorado

- Date: September 20
- Game time: 5:00 p.m. MDT
- Game weather: Cloudy • Temperature: 66 °F (19 °C) • Wind: N 5 mph
- Game attendance: 24,046
- Referee: Christian Watson
- TV announcers (CBSSN): Jason Knapp (play-by-play), Robert Turbin (analyst) and Brandon Baylor (sideline)
- Box score, Recap

Game information

First quarter

- (11:54) AFA – Dylan Carson 2-yard run, Jacob Medina kick (Drive: 5 plays, 74 yards, 2:07; Air Force 7–0)
- (7:09) BOIS – Dylan Riley 4-yard run, Colton Boomer kick (Drive: 9 plays, 75 yards, 4:45; Tied 7–7)
- (2:38) BOIS – Dylan Riley 34-yard run, Colton Boomer kick (Drive: 5 plays, 68 yards, 1:55; Boise State 14–7)

Second quarter

- (10:25) BOIS – Matt Lauter 3-yard pass from Maddux Madsen, Colton Boomer kick (Drive: 10 plays, 52 yards, 4:32; Boise State 21–7)
- (4:52) AFA – Kemper Hodges 3-yard run, Jacob Medina kick (Drive: 10 plays, 75 yards, 5:33; Boise State 21–14)

Third quarter

- (13:52) AFA – Liam Szarka 1-yard run, Jacob Medina kick (Drive: 3 plays, 75 yards, 1:08; Tied 21–21)
- (11:51) BOIS – Malik Sherrod 40-yard run, Colton Boomer kick (Drive: 4 plays, 75 yards, 2:01; Boise State 28–21)
- (1:10) AFA – Jacob Medina 25-yard field goal (Drive: 19 plays, 67 yards, 10:41; Boise State 28–24)
- (0:58) BOIS – Dylan Riley 75-yard pass from Maddux Madsen, Colton Boomer kick (Drive: 1 play, 75 yards, 0:12; Boise State 35–24)

Fourth quarter

- (9:44) AFA – Quin Smith 12-yard pass from Liam Szarka (Drive: 12 plays, 75 yards, 6:14; Boise State 35–30)
- (5:18) BOIS – Dylan Riley 8-yard run, Colton Boomer kick (Drive: 8 plays, 75 yards, 4:26; Boise State 42–30)
- (2:26) AFA – Bruin Fleischmann 5-yard pass from Liam Szarka, Jacob Medina kick (Drive: 6 plays, 75 yards, 2:52; Boise State 42–37)
- (2:08) BOIS – Dylan Riley 43-yard run, Colton Boomer kick (Drive: 3 plays, 50 yards, 0:16; Boise State 49–37)

Statistics	BOIS	AFA
First downs	23	24
Plays–yards	58–592	75–514
Rushes–yards	31–282	55–268
Passing yards	310	246
Passing: Comp–Att–Int	16–27–1	13–20–1
Turnovers	1	1
Time of possession	23:40	36:20

Team	Category	Player	Statistics
Boise State	Passing	Maddux Madsen	13/23, 276 yards, 2 TD, INT
Boise State	Rushing	Dylan Riley	19 carries, 171 yards, 4 TD
Boise State	Receiving	Latrell Caples	5 receptions, 87 yards
Air Force	Passing	Liam Szarka	13/18, 246 yards, 2 TD, INT
Air Force	Rushing	Liam Szarka	20 carries, 110 yards, TD
Air Force	Receiving	Cade Harris	8 receptions, 177 yards

=== Hawaii (rivalry) ===
Hawaii Rainbow Warriors (3–2) at Air Force Falcons (1–2) – Game summary

Quarter	1	2	3	4	Total
Rainbow Warriors	14	3	7	20	44
Falcons	7	0	7	21	35

at Falcon Stadium • Air Force Academy, Colorado

- Date: September 27
- Game time: 2:00 p.m. MDT
- Game weather: Sunny, 76 °F (24 °C)
- Game attendance: 22,677
- Referee: Cal McNeill
- TV announcers (FS1): Eric Collins (play-by-play) and Spencer Tillman (analyst)
- Box score, Recap

Game information

First quarter

- (11:25) HAW – Jackson Harris 6-yard pass from Micah Alejado, Kansei Matsuzawa kick (Drive: 6 plays, 75 yards, 3:35; Hawaii 7–0)
- (9:16) AFA – Bruin Fleischmann 5-yard pass from Liam Szarka, Jacob Medina kick (Drive: 4 plays, 74 yards, 2:04; Tied 7–7)
- (6:11) HAW – Brandon White 24-yard pass from Micah Alejado, Kansei Matsuzawa kick (Drive: 6 plays, 75 yards, 3:05; Hawaii 14–7)

Second quarter

- (3:49) HAW – Kansei Matsuzawa 24-yard field goal (Drive: 24 plays, 80 yards, 12:14; Hawaii 17–7)

Third quarter

- (12:33) AFA – Kade Frew 11-yard run, Jacob Medina kick (Drive: 5 plays, 75 yards, 2:27; Hawaii 17–14)
- (2:44) HAW – Landon Sims 1-yard run, Kansei Matsuzawa kick (Drive: 10 plays, 55 yards, 4:49; Hawaii 24–14)

Fourth quarter

- (14:55) HAW – Cam Barfield 27-yard run, Kansei Matsuzawa kick (Drive: 4 plays, 37 yards, 1:30; Hawaii 31–14)
- (14:04) AFA – Cade Harris 73-yard pass from Liam Szarka, Jacob Medina kick (Drive: 2 plays, 75 yards, 0:51; Hawaii 31–21)
- (11:14) HAW – Kansei Matsuzawa 39-yard field goal (Drive: 7 plays, 21 yards, 2:46; Hawaii 34–21)
- (5:58) AFA – Kemper Hodges 2-yard run, Jacob Medina kick (Drive: 10 plays, 75 yards, 5:16; Hawaii 34–21)
- (5:06) HAW – Jackson Harris 74-yard pass from Micah Alejado, Kansei Matsuzawa kick (Drive: 3 plays, 75 yards, 0:52; Hawaii 41–28)
- (4:30) AFA – Quin Smith 34-yard pass from Liam Szarka, Jacob Medina kick (Drive: 2 plays, 75 yards, 0:36; Hawaii 41–35)
- (0:34) HAW – Kansei Matsuzawa 24-yard field goal (Drive: 9 plays, 67 yards, 3:55; Hawaii 44–35)

Statistics	HAW	AFA
First downs	26	17
Plays–yards	78–535	47–494
Rushes–yards	31–78	34–216
Passing yards	457	278
Passing: Comp–Att–Int	35–47–0	10–13–1
Turnovers	0	1
Time of possession	37:24	22:36

Team	Category	Player	Statistics
Hawaii	Passing	Micah Alejado	35/47, 457 yards, 3 TD
Hawaii	Rushing	Landon Sims	13 carries, 59 yards, TD
Hawaii	Receiving	Jackson Harris	7 receptions, 144 yards, TD
Air Force	Passing	Liam Szarka	10/12, 278 yards, 3 TD, INT
Air Force	Rushing	Liam Szarka	17 carries, 139 yards
Air Force	Receiving	Cade Harris	3 receptions, 116 yards, TD

=== at Navy (Commander-in-Chief's Trophy) ===
Air Force Falcons (1–3) at Navy Midshipmen (4–0) – Game summary

Quarter	1	2	3	4	Total
Falcons	7	3	7	14	31
Midshipmen	3	14	7	10	34

at Navy–Marine Corps Memorial Stadium • Annapolis, Maryland

- Date: October 4
- Game time: 10:00 a.m. MDT / 12:00 p.m. EDT
- Game weather: Sunny • Temperature: 72 °F (22 °C) • Wind: S at 5 miles per hour (8.0 km/h)
- Game attendance: 37,517
- Referee: Nolan Dumas
- TV announcers (CBS): Rich Waltz (play-by-play), Ross Tucker (analyst) and Tiffany Blackmon (sideline)
- Box score, Recap

Game information

First quarter

- (11:22) NAVY – Nathan Kirkwood 39-yard field goal (Drive: 7 plays, 54 yards, 3:32; Navy 3–0)
- (9:14) AFA – Liam Szarka 7-yard run, Jacob Medina kick (Drive: 4 plays, 75 yards, 2:08; Air Force 7–3)

Second quarter

- (10:29) AFA – Jacob Medina 24-yard field goal (Drive: 9 plays, 87 yards, 4:39; Air Force 10–3)
- (8:46) NAVY – Eli Heidenreich 19-yard pass from Blake Horvath, Nathan Kirkwood kick (Drive: 4 plays, 53 yards, 1:35; Tied 10–10)
- (4:02) NAVY – Eli Heidenreich 80-yard pass from Blake Horvath, Nathan Kirkwood kick (Drive: 2 plays, 81 yards, 0:46; Navy 17–10)

Third quarter

- (9:58) AFA – Liam Szarka 1-yard run, Jacob Medina kick (Drive: 9 plays, 70 yards, 5:02; Tied 17–17)
- (5:52) NAVY – Blake Horvath 59-yard run, Nathan Kirkwood kick (Drive: 8 plays, 97 yards, 4:05; Navy 24–17)

Fourth quarter

- (14:55) AFA – Bruin Fleischmann 18-yard pass from Liam Szarka, Jacob Medina kick (Drive: 11 plays, 75 yards, 5:57; Tied 24–24)
- (12:55) NAVY – Eli Heidenreich 60-yard pass from Blake Horvath, Nathan Kirkwood kick (Drive: 4 plays, 71 yards, 1:55; Navy 31–24)
- (10:59) AFA – Jonah Dawson 53-yard pass from Liam Szarka, Jacob Medina kick (Drive: 5 plays, 75 yards, 1:56; Tied 31–31)
- (6:47) NAVY – Nathan Kirkwood 34-yard field goal (Drive: 9 plays, 60 yards, 4:05; Navy 34–31)

Statistics	AFA	NAVY
First downs	23	18
Plays–yards	65–460	55–517
Rushes–yards	45–211	29–178
Passing yards	249	339
Passing: comp–att–int	12–20–0	20–26–0
Turnovers	1	1
Time of possession	32:28	27:32

Team	Category	Player	Statistics
Air Force	Passing	Liam Szarka	11/19, 212 yards, 2 TD
Air Force	Rushing	Liam Szarka	25 carries, 152 yards, 2 TD
Air Force	Receiving	Bruin Fleischmann	6 receptions, 166 yards, TD
Navy	Passing	Blake Horvath	20/26, 339 yards, 3 TD
Navy	Rushing	Blake Horvath	17 carries, 130 yards, TD
Navy	Receiving	Eli Heidenreich	8 receptions, 243 yards, 3 TD

=== at UNLV ===
Air Force Falcons (1–4) at UNLV Rebels (5–0) – Game summary

Quarter	1	2	3	4	Total
Falcons	7	14	7	20	48
Rebels	7	6	16	22	51

at Allegiant Stadium • Paradise, Nevada

- Date: October 11
- Game time: 1:30 p.m. MDT / 12:30 p.m. PDT
- Game weather: None (played indoors)
- Game attendance: 32,932
- Referee: Patrick Foy
- TV announcers (CBSSN): Rich Waltz (play-by-play), Robert Turbin (analyst) and Tiffany Blackmon (sideline)

Game information
First quarter
- UNLV – Anthony Colandrea 3-yard run (Ramon Villela kick), 4:10. Rebels 7–0. Drive: 3 plays, 68 yards, 1:21.
- AFA – Cade Harris 5-yard run (Reagan Tubbs kick), 1:50. Tied 7–7. Drive: 6 plays, 75 yards, 2:20.

Second quarter

- UNLV – Ramon Villela 45-yard field goal, 13:33. Rebels 10–7. Drive: 8 plays, 54 yards, 3:11.
- AFA – Owen Allen 21-yard run (Reagan Tubbs kick), 10:17. Falcons 14–10. Drive: 6 plays, 70 yards, 3:16.
- AFA – Owen Allen 28-yard run (Reagan Tubbs kick), 4:26. Falcons 21–10. Drive: 6 plays, 52 yards, 3:09.
- UNLV – Ramon Villela 32-yard field goal, 0:50. Falcons 21–13. Drive: 11 plays, 61 yards, 3:36.

Third quarter

- UNLV – Var'Keyes Gumms 16-yard pass from Jaden Bradley (Ramon Villela kick), 14:49. Falcons 21–20. Drive: 1 play, 16 yards, 0:05.
- UNLV – Daejon Reynolds 86-yard pass from Anthony Colandrea (pass failed), 13:05. Rebels 26–21. Drive: 1 play, 86 yards, 0:13.
- AFA – Bruin Fleischmann 17-yard pass from Liam Szarka (Jacob Medina kick), 10:08. Falcons 28–26. Drive: 6 plays, 75 yards, 2:59.
- UNLV – Ramon Villela 20-yard field goal, 5:25. Rebels 29–28. Drive: 10 plays, 73 yards, 4:43.

Fourth quarter

- AFA – Liam Szarka 1-yard run (run failed), 14:20. Falcons 34–29. Drive: 12 plays, 75 yards, 6:05.
- UNLV – Keyvone Lee 2-yard run (Keyvone Lee run), 11:26. Rebels 37–34. Drive: 7 plays, 75 yards, 2:54.
- AFA – Cade Harris 4-yard run (Jacob Medina kick), 6:09. Falcons 41–37. Drive: 11 plays, 75 yards, 5:17.
- UNLV – Jai'Den Thomas 51-yard run (Ramon Villela kick), 4:55. Rebels 44–41. Drive: 3 plays, 75 yards, 1:14.
- AFA – Liam Szarka 9-yard run (Jacob Medina kick), 1:13. Falcons 48–44. Drive: 11 plays, 75 yards, 3:42.
- UNLV – Anthony Colandrea 19-yard run (Ramon Villela kick), 0:36. Rebels 51–48. Drive: 6 plays, 75 yards, 0:37.

Statistics	AFA	UNLV
First downs	32	24
Plays–yards	83–603	60–597
Rushes–yards	66–428	27–220
Passing yards	175	377
Passing: Comp–Att–Int	10–17–0	21–33–0
Turnovers	1	0
Time of possession	36:51	23:09

Team	Category	Player	Statistics
Air Force	Passing	Liam Szarka	10/17, 175 yards, TD
Air Force	Rushing	Owen Allen	17 carries, 192 yards, 2 TD
Air Force	Receiving	Jonah Dawson	3 receptions, 79 yards
UNLV	Passing	Anthony Colandrea	20/32, 361 yards, TD
UNLV	Rushing	Jai'Den Thomas	11 carries, 88 yards, TD
UNLV	Receiving	Deajon Renyolds	4 receptions, 139 yards, TD

=== Wyoming ===
Wyoming Cowboys (3–3) at Air Force Falcons (1–5) – Game summary

Quarter	1	2	3	4	Total
Cowboys	7	0	7	7	21
Falcons	3	3	8	10	24

at Falcon Stadium • Air Force Academy, Colorado

- Date: October 18
- Game time: 1:30 p.m. MDT
- Game weather: Sunny, 64 °F (18 °C)
- Game attendance: 23,401
- Referee: Brad Carrell
- TV announcers (CBSSN): Rich Waltz (play-by-play), Robert Turbin (analyst), and Tiffany Blackmon (sideline)

Game information

First quarter

- AFA – Reagan Tubbs 32-yard field goal, 5:52. Falcons 3–0. Drive: 16 plays, 60 yards, 9:08.
- WYO – Terron Kellman 23-yard run (Erik Sandvik kick), 1:32. Cowboys 7–3. Drive: 9 plays, 74 yards, 4:18.

Second quarter

- AFA – Reagan Tubbs 29-yard field goal, 6:41. Cowboys 7–6. Drive: 11 plays, 74 yards, 5:43.

Third quarter

- WYO – Terron Kellman 23-yard run (Erik Sandvik kick), 10:30. Cowboys 14–6. Drive: 10 plays, 75 yards, 4:33.
- AFA – Liam Szarka 1-yard run (Liam Szarka pass to Kade Frew), 6:40. Tied 14–14. Drive: 9 plays, 60 yards, 3:40.

Fourth quarter

- AFA – Kade Frew 9-yard run (Reagan Tubbs kick), 5:28. Falcons 21–14. Drive: 8 plays, 80 yards, 4:03.
- AFA – Reagan Tubbs 40-yard field goal, 3:04. Falcons 24–14. Drive: 4 plays, 6 yards, 1:35.
- WYO – Michael Fitzgerald 13-yard pass from Kaden Anderson (Erik Sandvik kick), 1:02. Falcons 24–21. Drive: 9 plays, 68 yards, 1:55.

Statistics	WYO	AFA
First downs	25	19
Plays–yards	66–409	64–363
Rushes–yards	36–198	56–330
Passing yards	211	33
Passing: Comp–Att–Int	23–30–2	3–8–0
Turnovers	2	0
Time of possession	26:57	33:03

Team	Category	Player	Statistics
Wyoming	Passing	Kaden Anderson	23/29, 211 yards, TD, INT
Wyoming	Rushing	Terron Kellman	9 carries, 83 yards, 2 TD
Wyoming	Receiving	Jaylen Sargent	5 receptions, 65 yards
Air Force	Passing	Liam Szarka	3/8, 33 yards
Air Force	Rushing	Liam Szarka	26 carries, 141 yards, TD
Air Force	Receiving	Jonah Dawson	1 reception, 18 yards

=== Army (Commander-in-Chief's Trophy) ===
Army Black Knights (3–4) at Air Force Falcons (2–5) – Game summary

Quarter	1	2	3	4	Total
Black Knights	7	3	0	10	20
Falcons	3	0	7	7	17

at Falcon Stadium • Air Force Academy, Colorado

- Date: November 1
- Game time: 11:00 a.m. MDT
- Game weather: Sunny, 41 °F (5 °C)
- Game attendance: 39,441
- Referee: Tim Rich
- TV announcers (CBS): Rich Waltz (play-by-play), Ross Tucker (analyst), and Tiffany Blackmon (sideline)

Game information

First quarter

- AFA – Reagan Tubbs 52-yard field goal, 2:25. Falcons 3–0. Drive: 11 plays, 36 yards, 6:18.
- ARMY – Noah Short 40-yard pass from Cale Hellums (Dawson Jones kick), 0:05. Black Knights 7–3. Drive: 4 plays, 75 yards, 2:20.

Second quarter

- ARMY – Dawson Jones 44-yard field goal, 0:35. Black Knights 10–3. Drive: 7 plays, 14 yards, 1:48.

Third quarter

- AFA – Liam Szarka 3-yard run (Reagan Tubbs kick), 0:00. Tied 10–10. Drive: 12 plays, 65 yards, 7:05.

Fourth quarter

- ARMY – Cale Hellums 10-yard run (Dawson Jones kick), 7:00. Black Knights 17–10. Drive: 13 plays, 75 yards, 8:00.
- AFA – Liam Szarka 2-yard run (Reagan Tubbs kick), 1:26. Tied 17–17. Drive: 3 plays, 26 yards, 0:53.
- ARMY – Dawson Jones 27-yard field goal, 0:00. Black Knights 20–17. Drive: 8 plays, 63 yards, 1:26.

Statistics	ARMY	AFA
First downs	15	23
Plays–yards	54–295	68–335
Rushes–yards	45–193	50–174
Passing yards	102	161
Passing: comp–att–int	5–9–0	13–18–2
Turnovers	0	3
Time of possession	25:56	34:04

Team	Category	Player	Statistics
Army	Passing	Cale Hellums	5/9, 102 yards, TD
Army	Rushing	Cale Hellums	26 carries, 98 yards, TD
Army	Receiving	Noah Short	3 receptions, 52 yards, TD
Air Force	Passing	Liam Szarka	13/17, 161 yards, 3 INT
Air Force	Rushing	Liam Szarka	29 carries, 91 yards, 2 TD
Air Force	Receiving	Jonah Dawson	4 receptions, 67 yards

=== at San Jose State ===
Air Force Falcons (2–6) at San Jose State Spartans (3–5) – Game summary

Quarter	1	2	3	4	Total
Falcons	0	16	0	10	26
Spartans	3	0	3	10	16

at CEFCU Stadium • San Jose, California

- Date: November 8
- Game time: 4:00 p.m. MST / 3:00 p.m. PST
- Game weather: Sunny, 75 °F (24 °C)
- Game attendance: 13,637
- Referee: Christian Watson
- TV announcers (FS1): Eric Collins (play-by-play) and Spencer Tillman (analyst)

Game information
First quarter
- SJSU – Denis Lynch 31-yard field goal, 11:44. Spartans 3–0. Drive: 7 plays, 47 yards, 1:56.

Second quarter

- AFA – Liam Szarka 3-yard run (Reagan Tubbs kick), 13:45. Falcons 7–3. Drive: 15 plays, 81 yards, 8:02.
- AFA – Liam Szarka 1-yard run (Reagan Tubbs kick), 8:31. Falcons 14–3. Drive: 8 plays, 45 yards, 4:17.
- AFA – Payton Zdroik safety, 1:43. Falcons 16–3.

Third quarter

- SJSU – Mathias Brown 29-yard field goal, 10:34. Falcons 16–6. Drive: 10 plays, 69 yards, 4:26.

Fourth quarter

- SJSU – Steve Chavez–Soto (Denis Lynch kick), 14:20. Falcons 16–13. Drive: 11 plays, 88 yards, 4:23.
- AFA – Quin Smith 12-yard pass from Liam Szarka (Reagan Tubbs kick), 9:11. Falcons 23–13. Drive: 19 plays, 75 yards, 5:09.
- SJSU – Denis Lynch 34-yard field goal, 5:43. Falcons 23–16. Drive: 9 plays, 59 yards, 3:28.
- AFA – Reagan Tubbs 33-yard field goal, 0:31. Falcons 26–16. Drive: 11 plays, 60 yards, 5:12.

Statistics	AFA	SJSU
First downs	21	23
Plays–yards	73–302	60–435
Rushes–yards	63–261	17–94
Passing yards	41	341
Passing: Comp–Att–Int	5–10–0	28–43–2
Turnovers	0	3
Time of possession	36:26	23:34

Team	Category	Player	Statistics
Air Force	Passing	Liam Szarka	5/10, 41 yards, TD
Air Force	Rushing	Owen Allen	20 carries, 109 yards
Air Force	Receiving	Bruin Fleischmann	2 receptions, 29 yards
San Jose State	Passing	Walker Eget	27/42, 334 yards, 2 INT
San Jose State	Rushing	Steve Chavez-Soto	9 carries, 49 yards, TD
San Jose State	Receiving	Leland Smith	9 receptions, 144 yards

=== at UConn ===
Air Force Falcons (3–6) at UConn Huskies (7–3) – Game summary

Quarter	1	2	3	4	Total
Falcons	7	0	3	6	16
Huskies	6	3	7	10	26

at Rentschler Field • East Hartford, Connecticut

- Date: November 15
- Game time: 10:00 a.m. MST / 12:00 p.m. EST
- Game weather: Sunny, 43 °F (6 °C)
- Game attendance: 31,457
- Referee: Gary Reed
- TV announcers (CBSSN): Chris Lewis (play-by-play), Randy Cross (analyst) and Richard Johnson (sideline)

Game information

First quarter

- CONN – Joe Fagnano 10-yard run (pass failed), 10:29. Huskies 6–0. Drive: 7 plays, 40 yards, 2:39.
- AFA – Dylan Carson 6-yard run (Reagan Tubbs kick), 4:48. Falcons 7–6. Drive: 10 plays, 75 yards, 5:41.

Second quarter

- CONN – Chris Freeman 47-yard field goal, 0:28. Huskies 9–7. Drive: 7 plays, 35 yards, 1:15.

Third quarter

- CONN – Cam Edwards 8-yard run (Chris Freeman kick), 11:18. Huskies 16–7. Drive: 6 plays, 79 yards, 3:38.
- AFA – Reagan Tubbs 36-yard field goal, 5:17. Huskies 16–10. Drive: 11 plays, 56 yards, 6:01.

Fourth quarter

- CONN – Chris Freeman 27-yard field goal, 14:16. Huskies 19–10. Drive: 12 plays, 56 yards, 5:50.
- CONN – Cam Edwards 5-yard run (Chris Freeman kick), 5:28. Huskies 26–10. Drive: 10 plays, 84 yards, 6:24.
- AFA – Dylan Carson 2-yard run (pass failed), 2:29. Huskies 26–16. Drive: 9 plays, 75 yards, 2:54.

Statistics	AFA	CONN
First downs	23	18
Plays–yards	69–356	53–347
Rushes–yards	58–290	30–192
Passing yards	66	155
Passing: Comp–Att–Int	6-11-0	15-23-1
Turnovers	0	1
Time of possession	35:25	24:35

Team	Category	Player	Statistics
Air Force	Passing	Liam Szarka	2/3, 34 yards
Air Force	Rushing	Owen Allen	22 carries, 122 yards
Air Force	Receiving	Cade Harris	2 receptions, 25 yards
UConn	Passing	Joe Fagnano	15/23, 155 yards, INT
UConn	Rushing	Cam Edwards	24 carries, 165 yards, 2 TD
UConn	Receiving	Skyler Bell	8 receptions, 70 yards

=== New Mexico ===
New Mexico Lobos (7–3) at Air Force Falcons (3–7) – Game summary

Quarter	1	2	3	4	Total
Lobos	7	10	0	3	20
Falcons	0	0	0	3	3

at Falcon Stadium • Air Force Academy, Colorado

- Date: November 22
- Game time: 5:00 p.m. MST
- Game attendance: 20,218
- Referee: Brad Carrell
- TV announcers (CBSSN): Chris Lewis (play-by-play) and Randy Cross (analyst)

Game information

First quarter

- UNM – Jack Layne 12-yard run (Luke Drzewiecki kick), 9:27. Lobos 7–0. Drive: 9 plays, 75 yards, 5:33.

Second quarter

- UNM – Damon Bankston 2-yard run (Luke Drzewiecki kick), 12:08. Lobos 14–0. Drive: 15 plays, 82 yards, 8:43.
- UNM – Luke Drzewiecki 27-yard field goal, 9:42. Lobos 17–0. Drive: 4 plays, 4 yards, 1:32.

Third quarter

- No scoring plays.

Fourth quarter

- AFA – Reagan Tubbs 27-yard field goal, 10:12. Lobos 17–3. Drive: 19 plays, 75 yards, 3:28.
- UNM – Luke Drzewiecki 23-yard field goal, 3:59. Lobos 20–3. Drive: 11 plays, 63 yards, 6:08.

Statistics	UNM	AFA
First downs	18	14
Plays–yards	55–277	59–161
Rushes–yards	40–172	48–110
Passing yards	105	91
Passing: Comp–Att–Int	10–15–0	4–11–1
Turnovers	0	2
Time of possession	30:46	29:14

Team	Category	Player	Statistics
New Mexico	Passing	Jack Layne	10/15, 105 yards
New Mexico	Rushing	Damon Bankston	10 carries, 61 yards, TD
New Mexico	Receiving	Keagan Johnson	4 receptions, 55 yards
Air Force	Passing	Josh Johnson	3/6, 46 yards, INT
Air Force	Rushing	Kemper Hodges	20 carries, 50 yards
Air Force	Receiving	Jonah Dawson	2 receptions, 28 yards

=== at Colorado State (Ram–Falcon Trophy) ===
Air Force Falcons (3-8) at Colorado State Rams (2-9) – Game summary

Quarter	1	2	3	4	Total
Falcons	14	7	7	14	42
Rams	0	7	7	7	21

at Canvas Stadium • Fort Collins, Colorado

- Date: November 28
- Game time: 1:00 p.m. MST
- Game weather: Sunny • Temperature: 54 °F (12 °C) • Wind: S at 5 miles per hour (8.0 km/h)
- Game attendance: 25,873
- Referee: Kenneth Ray
- TV announcers (FS1): Evan Lepler (play-by-play) and Lincoln Kennedy (analyst)

Game information

First quarter

- AFA – Bruin Fleischmann 55-yard pass from Josh Johnson (Reagan Tubbs kick), 9:50. Falcons 7–0. Drive: 8 plays, 75 yards, 5:10.
- AFA – Owen Allen 6-yard run (Reagan Tubbs kick), 2:26. Falcons 14–0. Drive: 10 plays, 68 yards, 6:08.

Second quarter

- CSU – Tay Lanier 20-yard pass from Jackson Brousseau (Isaiah Hankins kick), 8:48. Falcons 14–7. Drive: 13 plays, 75 yards, 6:00.
- AFA – Kemper Hodges 1-yard run (Reagan Tubbs kick), 0:14. Falcons 21–7. Drive: 17 plays, 75 yards, 8:34.

Third quarter

- CSU – Lloyd Avant 5-yard run (Isaiah Hankins kick), 11:19. Falcons 21–14. Drive: 9 plays, 75 yards, 3:41.
- AFA – Josh Johnson 3-yard run (Reagan Tubbs kick), 5:37. Falcons 28–14. Drive: 9 plays, 45 yards, 5:41.

Fourth quarter

- AFA – Bruin Fleischmann 6-yard pass from Josh Johnson (Reagan Tubbs kick), 9:09. Falcons 35–14. Drive: 13 plays, 80 yards, 7:59.
- CSU – Rocky Beers 28-yard pass from Jackson Brousseau (Isaiah Hankins kick), 6:51. Falcons 35–21. Drive: 5 plays, 75 yards, 2:18.
- AFA – Owen Allen 7-yard run (Reagan Tubbs kick), 3:05. Falcons 42–21. Drive: 8 plays, 56 yards, 3:44.

Statistics	AFA	CSU
First downs	22	17
Plays–yards	71–420	46–335
Rushes–yards	67–316	9–12
Passing yards	104	323
Passing: Comp–Att–Int	4–4–0	28–37–0
Turnovers	0	0
Time of possession	40:47	19:13

Team	Category	Player	Statistics
Air Force	Passing	Josh Johnson	4/4, 104 yards, 2 TD
Air Force	Rushing	Owen Allen	25 carries, 107 yards, 2 TD
Air Force	Receiving	Bruin Fleischmann	2 receptions, 61 yards, 2 TD
Colorado State	Passing	Jackson Brousseau	28/37, 323 yards, 2 TD
Colorado State	Rushing	Lloyd Avant	3 carries, 11 yards, TD
Colorado State	Receiving	Lloyd Avant	8 receptions, 135 yards

== Personnel ==
=== Transfers ===
==== Outgoing ====
Player	Position	Destination
Jaylen Archibald	DB	North Dakota State
Cole Baird	DE	Maine
Keshon Singleton	WR	Indiana State
David Santiago	LB	Michigan State
Styles Goodman	LB	Montana
Hiro Carr	ATH	Morgan State
Tyler Lawrence	OL	New Mexico
Connor Irons	TE	San Diego State
Lincoln Tuioti-Mariner	S	Southern Utah
Luke Faccone	P/K	Eastern Washington
Caleb Chamberlain	S	Ohio
Jordan Triplett	RB	Cornell
Cody Ahola	TE	San Jose City College
Trey Williams	DB	Unknown
Aidan Plate	S	Unknown
Jacob Drackett	QB	Unknown
