= Sire Gaines =

American football player (born 2006)

No. 26 – Boise State Broncos
- Position: Running back
- Class: Redshirt Freshman

Personal information
- Born: September 25, 2006 (age 20)
- Listed height: 6 ft 0 in (1.83 m)
- Listed weight: 225 lb (102 kg)

Career information
- High school: Orange Vista (Perris, California)
- College: Boise State (2024–present)
- Stats at ESPN

Sire Gaines (born September 25, 2006) is an American college football running back for the Boise State Broncos.

== Early life ==
Gaines attended Orange Vista High School in Perris, California. He played both running back and safety. As a senior in 2023, he was the Inland Empire Varsity Player of the Year after he rushed for 1,685 yards with 27 touchdowns. For his career Gaines had 3,050 rushing yards, 48 rushing touchdowns, 1,928 receiving yards on 94 receptions with 21 touchdowns on offense and 95 tackles, five interceptions and seven sacks on defense. He originally committed to play college football at Arizona State University, but later committed to play at Boise State University.

== College career ==
As a true freshman at Boise State in 2024, Gaines played in three games as a backup to Ashton Jeanty before suffering a season-ending injury. He rushed 20 times for 156 yards with a touchdown. He medically redshirted the remainder of the season.

In 2025, Gaines shared starting running back duties with Dylan Riley. Gaines rushed for 811 yds and scored 8 touchdowns on 161 carries. He also caught 11 passes for 72 yards and a touchdown. His most productive game was against Colorado St. Gaines rushed for a career-best 149 yards and 2 touchdowns on 22 carries and caught a 12-yard pass.

As a redshirt sophomore in 2026, Gaines again started at running back alongside Dylan Riley. The pair had also shared the position (and played linebacker on defense) on the same Under-12 youth football team in their hometown of Moreno Valley, CA.
