= Spencer Danielson =

American football coach (born 1988)

Current position
- Title: Head coach
- Team: Boise State
- Conference: Pac-12
- Record: 33–10

Biographical details
- Born: November 2, 1988 (age 38); Solana Beach, California, U.S.

Playing career
- 2008: San Diego
- 2009–2011: Azusa Pacific
- Position: Linebacker

Coaching career (HC unless noted)
- 2013: Azusa Pacific (GA)
- 2014–2016: Azusa Pacific (LB)
- 2017: Boise State (GA)
- 2018: Boise State (DE)
- 2019–2020: Boise State (co-DC/DL)
- 2021–2023: Boise State (DC/ILB)
- 2023–present: Boise State

Head coaching record
- Overall: 33–10 (.767)
- Bowls: 0–3
- Tournaments: 0–1 (CFP)

Accomplishments and honors

Championships
- 3 MW (2023–2025)

Awards
- MW Coach of the Year (2024)

Spencer William Danielson (born November 2, 1988) is an American college football coach. He is the head football coach at Boise State University, a position he has held since midway through the 2023 season. Danielson previously served as an assistant coach at Boise State and Azusa Pacific University. Danielson played college football as a linebacker at the University of San Diego in 2008 and at Azusa Pacific from 2009 to 2011.

== Early life and education ==
Danielson began his college football career at the University of San Diego as a linebacker in 2009. He then transferred to Azusa Pacific University, where he played from 2010 to 2012. While at Azusa Pacific, Danielson earned his bachelor's degree and master's degree in business administration.

== Coaching career ==
=== Assistant coaching ===
==== Azusa Pacific ====
In 2013, Danielson began his coaching career at Azusa Pacific as a graduate assistant under head coach Victor Santa Cruz. In 2014, he was promoted to linebackers coach.

==== Boise State ====
In 2017, Danielson joined the Boise State Broncos football coaching staff as a graduate assistant. In that role he worked with the stand-up defensive linemen, and continued to do so in 2018 after being promoted to a full-time defensive assistant. He was promoted to defensive line coach in 2019, succeeding Chad Kauhaʻahaʻa. When head coach Bryan Harsin departed after the 2021 season to become the head coach at Auburn, Danielson briefly served as interim head coach until Andy Avalos was hired as the permanent coach. Danielson declined a job with Harsin at Auburn to remain with Avalos as defensive coordinator.

On November 12, 2023, Danielson was named interim head coach after head coach Andy Avalos was fired. On December 3, 2023, he was named the 12th head football coach at Boise State.

In April, 2026 Boise State University extended Danielson's contract through the 2030 season with a five-year, $11.5 million deal that includes a $3.5 million buyout if terminated early by the coach.

== Personal life ==
Danielson is a devout Christian. He married to Raechel Jones, a fellow Azusa Pacific alum and college volleyball player, in 2015. They have two daughters.

== Head coaching record ==
Year	Team	Overall	Conference	Standing	Bowl/playoffs	Coaches^{#}	AP^{°}
Boise State Broncos (Mountain West Conference) (2023–2025)
2023	Boise State	3–1 (Note: Danielson replaced Avalos with two regular-season games remaining)	2–0	T–1st	L LA		
2024	Boise State	12–2	8–0	1st	L Fiesta^{†}	9	8
2025	Boise State	9–5	6–2	T–1st	L LA		
Boise State Broncos (Pac-12 Conference) (2026–present)
2026	Boise State	9–2	6–1	1st			
Boise State:		33–10	23–3				
Total:		33–10					
National championship Conference title Conference division title or championship game berth
