= Chris Marshall (American football) =

American football player (born 2003)

- Marshall in 2026

No. 6 – Arkansas Razorbacks
- Position: Wide receiver
- Class: Fifth Year

Personal information
- Born: November 7, 2003 (age 23)
- Listed height: 6 ft 3 in (1.91 m)
- Listed weight: 213 lb (97 kg)

Career information
- High school: Thurgood Marshall (Missouri City, Texas)
- College: Texas A&M (2022); Kilgore College (2023); Boise State (2024–2025); Arkansas (2026–present)
- Stats at ESPN

Christian Marshall (born November 7, 2003) is an American college football wide receiver for the Arkansas Razorbacks. He previously played for the Texas A&M Aggies, Killgore College Rangers, and Boise State Broncos.

== Early life ==
Marshall grew up in Missouri City, Texas and attended Thurgood Marshall High School. He focused solely on basketball and did not play football until his junior year. In his first season, Marshall caught 45 passes for 1,009 yards and 18 touchdowns. He played in seven games as a senior and had 15 receptions for 466 yards and scored 11 touchdowns. After the season, Marshall played in the 2022 All-American Bowl. He was rated a four-star recruit and committed to play college football at Texas A&M after considering offers from Alabama and USC. Marshall was later re-rated as a five-star recruit.

== College career ==
Marshall enrolled at Texas A&M in July 2022. Marshall was suspended along with three other players for the Aggies' game against Miami. Marshall was suspended again, for an indefinite period of time, along with two other players following a violation of team rules. He had originally planned to play basketball for Texas A&M after the end of the football season, but was left off the roster by coach Buzz Williams after the second suspension was announced. Following the end of the season Marshall entered the NCAA transfer portal.

Marshall ultimately transferred to Ole Miss but was dismissed from the team in May 2023 before playing a game, for what Coach Lane Kiffin deemed a "violation of team rules." Marshall later enrolled at Kilgore College.
