= Demond Williams Jr. =

American football quarterback (born 2006)

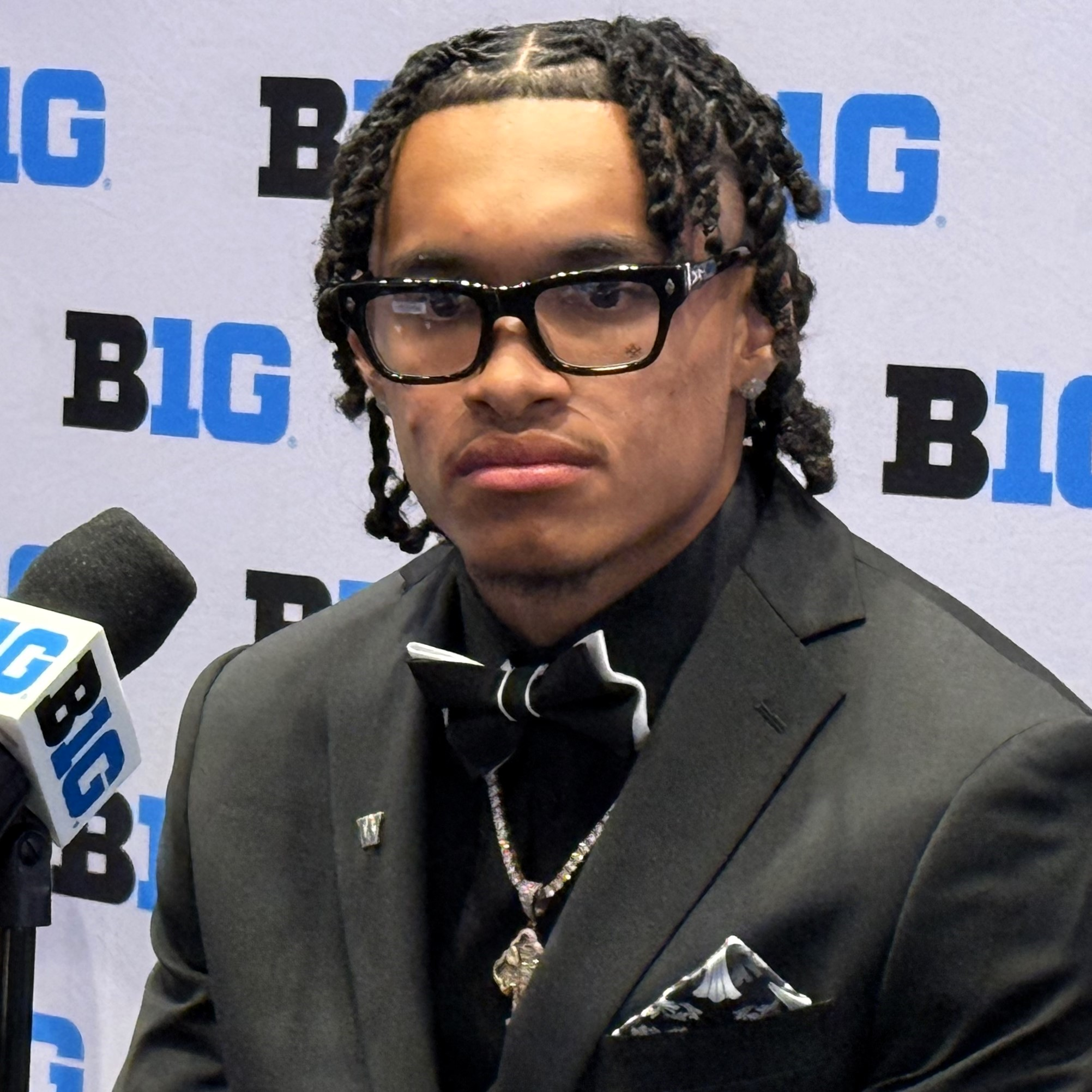
- Williams at 2025 Big Ten Media Days

No. 1 – Washington Huskies
- Position: Quarterback
- Class: Junior

Personal information
- Born: March 20, 2006 (age 20); Chandler, Arizona, U.S.
- Listed height: 5 ft 11 in (1.80 m)
- Listed weight: 191 lb (87 kg)

Career information
- High school: Basha (Chandler)
- College: Washington (2024–present)

Awards and highlights
- 2025 LA Bowl offensive MVP
- Stats at ESPN

Demond Williams Jr. (born March 20, 2006) is an American college football quarterback for the Washington Huskies.

== Early life ==
Williams attended Basha High School in Chandler, Arizona. As a junior, he completed 68% of his passes for 2,339 yards and 23 touchdowns to just one interception, while also adding 764 yards and five touchdowns on the ground. Coming out of high school, Williams was rated as a four-star recruit and the 19th overall quarterback in the class of 2024. He received offers from schools such as Arizona, Auburn, BYU, Ole Miss, and Purdue. On December 30, 2022, Williams committed to play college football for the Ole Miss Rebels. However on July 7, 2023, Williams de-committed from Ole Miss. Williams later flipped his commitment to play for the Arizona Wildcats.

== College career ==
2024

Williams enrolled early at Arizona. After Arizona coach Jedd Fisch left to coach the Washington Huskies, Williams entered the transfer portal and followed Fisch to Washington. As a true freshman, Williams played in every game, starting the final two (at No. 1 Oregon and vs. Louisville in the Sun Bowl), at quarterback. He finished the season 82-for-105 (.781) for 944 yards, eight touchdowns, and just one interception, while rushing for 282 yards and two scores on 83 carries.

2025

Williams earned honorable mention All-Big Ten Conference, Big Ten All-Academic team, Washington's Offensive Most Valuable Player Award and offensive MVP of the LA Bowl.

Williams earned the Big Ten Offensive Player of the Week and Maxwell Award Player of the Week, becoming the first Husky in history and 16th quarterback in FBS history to pass for 400 yards and rush for 100 in the same game, breaking the UW record for single-game total offense in a win over Rutgers. Williams was named Big Ten Co-Offensive Player of the Week after his performance in the Apple Cup, where he threw for 298 yards and four touchdowns and ran for 88 yards and a touchdown.

2026

On January 6, 2026, Williams communicated intentions to enter the transfer portal. This announcement came just days after signing a $4 million agreement to return to Washington in 2026. On January 8, amid controversy and threatened legal action, Williams rescinded his intent to transfer and committed to stay at Washington for the upcoming season.

=== Statistics ===
Season	Team	Games			Passing								Rushing			
Season	Team	GP	GS	Record	Cmp	Att	Pct	Yds	Avg	TD	Int	Rate	Att	Yds	Avg	TD
2024	Washington	13	2	0–2	82	105	78.1	944	9.0	8	1	176.8	83	282	3.4	2
2025	Washington	13	13	9–4	246	354	69.5	3,065	8.7	25	8	161.0	143	611	4.3	6
2026	Washington	6	6	3–3	116	174	66.7	1,396	8.0	8	3	145.7	64	183	2.9	2
Career		32	21	12–9	444	633	70.1	5,405	8.5	41	12	159.5	290	1,076	3.7	10
