= Dylan Riley (American football) =

American football player (born 2006)

No. 0 – Boise State Broncos
- Position: Running back
- Class: Junior

Personal information
- Born: June 16, 2006 (age 20)
- Listed height: 5 ft 10 in (1.78 m)
- Listed weight: 192 lb (87 kg)

Career information
- High school: Rancho Verde (Moreno Valley, California)
- College: Boise State (2024–present)

Awards and highlights
- Second-team All-Mountain West (2025)
- Stats at ESPN

Dylan Riley (born June 16, 2006) is an American college football running back for the Boise State Broncos.

== Early life ==
Riley was rated as a three-star recruit and committed to play college football for the Boise State Broncos.

== College career ==
In week 3 of the 2024 season, Riley was named the Mountain West Conference freshman of the week after rushing for 96 yards and two touchdowns in a win against Portland State. He finished the 2024 season with 135 rushing yards and two touchdowns on 22 carries, while also returning a kickoff 96 yards for a touchdown. In week four of the 2025 season, Riley ran for 171 yards and four touchdowns on 19 carries, while also hauling in two passes for 84 yards and a touchdown in a victory over Air Force.

=== Statistics ===
| Season | Team | Games | | Rushing | | | | Receiving | | | | Kick Returns | | | |
| Season | Team | GP | GS | Att | Yds | Avg | TD | Rec | Yds | Avg | TD | Ret | Yds | Avg | TD |
|---|---|---|---|---|---|---|---|---|---|---|---|---|---|---|---|
| 2024 | Boise State | 11 | 0 | 22 | 135 | 6.1 | 2 | 3 | 22 | 7.3 | 0 | 8 | 237 | 29.6 | 1 |
| 2025 | Boise State | 14 | 10 | 195 | 1,125 | 5.8 | 10 | 15 | 149 | 9.9 | 2 | 0 | 0 | 0 | 0 |
| 2026 | Boise State | 2 | 2 | 36 | 256 | 7.1 | 0 | 3 | 16 | 5.3 | 0 | 0 | 0 | 0 | 0 |
| Career | | 27 | 12 | 253 | 1,516 | 6.0 | 12 | 21 | 187 | 8.9 | 2 | 8 | 237 | 29.6 | 1 |
