= Jaxton Eck =

American football player (born 2004)

No. 6 – New Mexico Lobos
- Position: Linebacker
- Class: Senior

Personal information
- Born: December 30, 2004 (age 21); Moscow, Idaho, U.S.
- Listed height: 6 ft 1 in (1.85 m)
- Listed weight: 224 lb (102 kg)

Career information
- High school: Brookings (Brookings, South Dakota)
- College: Idaho (2023–2024); New Mexico (2025–present)

Awards and highlights
- MW co-Defensive Player of the Year (2025); First-team All-Mountain West (2025); First-team All-Big Sky (2024)
- Stats at ESPN

Jaxton Eck (born December 30, 2004) is an American college football linebacker for the New Mexico Lobos. He previously played for the Idaho.

== Early life ==
Eck was born on December 30, 2004, in Moscow, Idaho, to Jason and Kimberly Eck. The family moved seven times from his birth to high school due to his father's job as a college football coach. Eck was often placed in older age groups while participating in youth sports so that he could play with his older brother Quentin. According to Kimberly, she would "rather watch both [her] kids at once". Eck played sports like soccer growing up, but gravitated towards football, looking up to Colt McCoy. He played quarterback, running back, defensive tackle, and linebacker in his youth.

== High school career ==
Eck attended Brookings High School in Brookings, South Dakota, where he was a standout in football and basketball. In three years of varsity football, he recorded 253 tackles, 46 tackles for loss (TFL), 10 sacks, five interceptions, and six forced fumbles and helped Brookings to two straight district titles and playoff appearances. As a senior, Eck posted 136 tackles, 19 TFL, four forced fumbles, two sacks, two interceptions, and a defensive touchdown. He was honored as a class 11AA all-state selection by the SDFCA, and was named to the Argus Leader Elite 45, an all-star team of the best players in the state regardless of class.

Eck received offers to play college football from Idaho and Incarnate Word, as well as several more from NCAA Division II programs. On October 26, 2022, he verbally committed to play for the Idaho Vandals under his father, who was the Idaho head coach. Eck signed with the Vandals in December.

== College career ==
=== Idaho ===
Despite initially wanting to avoid the stigma that goes with being the "coach's kid", Eck changed his mind when his father was hired to coach at Idaho: "I thought it’d be cool to come back to where I was born," he said, adding that "having [his] family be able to come see [him] play also played a big role." Ahead of his first spring game in 2023, the Moscow-Pullman Daily News wrote: "His ability to read plays and shed blocks has been impressive — it’s almost like he’s a coach’s kid or something." Eck appeared in 12 games as a freshman, tallying 37 tackles and three tackles for loss (TFL). He bulked up in the offseason by focusing on his nutrition. Ahead of the 2024 season, Eck recorded a pick-six in the spring game while suiting up for the first team. He stepped into a leadership role on the defense as the season progressed, according to his father. Eck was named the Big Sky Conference co-defensive player of the week in early October after he recorded his first collegiate interception and a team-high 11 tackles in a 23–17 win over Northern Arizona. He started all 14 games on the season and logged a team-high 134 tackles, to go along with 3.5 TFL and an interception, and earned first-team all-Big Sky honors.

Eck entered the NCAA transfer portal following the conclusion of the season, just a few days after his father was hired as the head coach at New Mexico. He was rated as a three-star transfer recruit by 247Sports. Eck received offers from programs such as Michigan State, NC State, and Stanford. On December 26, 2024, it was announced that he would be joining his father and transferring to New Mexico to play for the Lobos.

=== New Mexico ===
Eck was unable to participate in New Mexico's spring camp ahead of the 2025 season because he was recovering from offseason surgery. However, he had a strong performance in fall camp, securing a starting spot ahead of their season opener at Michigan. Eck was named the Mountain West Conference defensive player of the week in mid-September after he posted a game-high 11 tackles, forced a fumble, and deflected a pass that led to an interception to seal a 35–10 win at UCLA, which marked the Lobos' first Power Conference win in 17 years. The following week, he recorded his first career sack in a 38–20 victory over New Mexico State in the 115th annual Rio Grande Rivalry game. In his next game, Eck tallied a career-high 18 tackles in a 41–25 loss to Boise State. He helped the Lobos earn a bid to the 2025 Rate Bowl and finished the season with a team-high 129 tackles to go along with 6.5 TFL and 1.5 sacks in 13 starts. Aside from earning first-team all-Mountain West honors, Eck was named the Mountain West co-Defensive Player of the Year, sharing the award with Chris Johnson of San Diego State. Meanwhile, his father was named the Coach of the Year.

Eck re-signed with New Mexico for the 2026 season.

== Personal life ==
Eck has four siblings: Quintin, Palmer, Maverick, and Lola. He was named a first-team academic All-American by the Collegiate Sports Communicators while at New Mexico.
