= 2025 Mountain West Conference football season =

27th season of Mountain West Conference football in 2025

- League: NCAA Division I FBS
- Sport: Football
- Duration: August 23, 2025 – December 5, 2025
- Teams: 12
- TV partner(s): CBS Sports (CBS, CBSSN); Fox Sports (Fox, FS1, FS2)

2026 NFL draft
- Top draft pick: Chris Johnson
- Picked by: Miami Dolphins

Regular season
- Season champions: Boise State
- Runners-up: UNLV; New Mexico; San Diego State

Championship Game
- Date: December 5, 2025
- Venue: Albertsons Stadium, Boise, Idaho
- Champions: Boise State
- Runners-up: UNLV

Seasons
- 2024 2026

2025 Mountain West Conference football standings
| | Conf. | | | Overall |
| Team | W | | L | W | | L |
|---|---|---|---|---|---|---|
| Boise State y$ | 6 | – | 2 | 9 | – | 5 |
| UNLV y | 6 | – | 2 | 10 | – | 4 |
| San Diego State | 6 | – | 2 | 9 | – | 4 |
| New Mexico | 6 | – | 2 | 9 | – | 4 |
| Fresno State | 5 | – | 3 | 9 | – | 4 |
| Hawaii | 5 | – | 3 | 9 | – | 4 |
| Utah State | 4 | – | 4 | 6 | – | 7 |
| Air Force | 3 | – | 5 | 4 | – | 8 |
| Nevada | 2 | – | 6 | 3 | – | 9 |
| Wyoming | 2 | – | 6 | 4 | – | 8 |
| San Jose State | 2 | – | 6 | 3 | – | 9 |
| Colorado State | 1 | – | 7 | 2 | – | 10 |
Championship: Boise State 38, UNLV 21
$ – Conference champion; y – Championship game participant; Rankings from CFP Rankings

The 2025 Mountain West Conference football season is the 27th season of college football for the Mountain West Conference. It is part of the 2025 NCAA Division I FBS football season. 12 teams are competing in the conference during the season. The season began on August 23, 2025, and conclude with the Mountain West Conference Football Championship Game on December 5, 2025. The full season schedule was released on February 20, 2025.

== Conference realignment ==
The 2025 is the final season before major realignment for the Mountain West Conference. Five schools – Boise State, Colorado State, Fresno State, San Diego State, and Utah State – will all depart the Mountain West after 2025 to join the Pac-12 Conference. Two schools will join the Mountain West in 2026 as football members to replace the departing schools. UTEP will join as a full member of the Mountain West, while Northern Illinois And North Dakota State will join as football-only associate members. Additionally, Hawaii will become a full-member of the Mountain West beginning in 2026. Hawaii had been a football-only member of the conference since joining in 2012, with the Western Athletic Conference being the previous primary conference.

== Coaches ==
=== Coaching changes ===
- On December 4, 2024, Fresno State announced that Matt Entz would become the new permanent head coach beginning in 2025. Entz had previously been the associate head coach at USC and the head coach at North Dakota State
- On December 6, 2024, Utah State announced that they had hired Bronco Mendenhall away from New Mexico to become their head coach for 2025. On December 14, 2024, New Mexico announced Jason Eck as their new head coach for 2025. Eck had previously been head coach at Idaho.
- On December 8, 2024, UNLV head coach Barry Odom was announced as the new head coach of Purdue in the Big Ten Conference. On December 12, 2024, UNLV announced that Dan Mullen would be the new head coach for the 2025 season. Mullen had previously been head coach of Florida in the SEC.

=== Head coaches ===
| Team | Head coach | Years at school | Overall record | Record at school | MW record |
|---|---|---|---|---|---|
| Air Force | Troy Calhoun | 19 | 135–89 | 135–89 | 80–58 |
| Boise State | Spencer Danielson | 3 | 15–3 | 15–3 | 10–0 |
| Colorado State | Jay Norvell | 4 | 49–47 | 16–21 | 35–29 |
| Fresno State | Matt Entz | 1 | 60–11 | 0–0 | 0–0 |
| Hawaii | Timmy Chang | 4 | 13–25 | 13–25 | 8–15 |
| Nevada | Jeff Choate | 2 | 31–32 | 3–10 | 0–7 |
| New Mexico | Jason Eck | 1 | 26–13 | 0–0 | 0–0 |
| San Diego State | Sean Lewis | 2 | 27–40 | 3–9 | 2–5 |
| San Jose State | Ken Niumatalolo | 2 | 116–89 | 7–6 | 3–4 |
| UNLV | Dan Mullen | 1 | 103–61 | 0–0 | 0–0 |
| Utah State | Bronco Mendenhall | 1 | 140–88 | 0–0 | 3–4 |
| Wyoming | Jay Sawvel | 2 | 3–9 | 3–9 | 2–5 |

=== Mid-season changes ===
- On October 19, Colorado State announced that they had fired head coach Jay Norvell. Norvell had posted an 18–26 record during his time at the school. Defensive coordinator Tyson Summers was named interim head coach for the remainder of the season.

== Preseason ==
=== Preseason Poll ===
The Preseason Media Poll was released July 16, 2025. Boise State was selected as the preseason favorite to claim the 2025 Mountain West football regular-season title.

| Predicted finish | Team | Votes (for first) |
|---|---|---|
| 1 | Boise State | 464 (35) |
| 2 | UNLV | 415 (4) |
| 3 | San Jose State | 359 |
| 4 | Colorado State | 326 |
| 5 | Fresno State | 301 |
| 6 | Air Force | 280 |
| 7 | Hawaii | 213 |
| 8 | San Diego State | 202 |
| 9 | Utah State | 165 |
| 10 | Wyoming | 150 |
| 11 | New Mexico | 84 |
| 12 | Nevada | 83 |

=== Preseason All-Conference team ===
Mountain West preseason awards and all-conference teams were announced on July 16.

==== Awards ====
| Position | Player | Class | Position | Team |
|---|---|---|---|---|
Award
| Offensive Player of the Year | Maddux Madsen | Jr. | QB | Boise State |
| Defensive Player of the Year | Trey White | Jr. | EDGE | San Diego State |
| Special Teams Player of the Year | Gabe Plascencia | Sr. | PK | San Diego State |

==== All-conference team ====
| Position | Player | Class | Team |
|---|---|---|---|
First Team Offense
| QB | Maddux Madsen | Jr. | Boise State |
| RB | Scottre Humphrey | Jr. | New Mexico |
| RB | Jai'Den Thomas | Jr. | UNLV |
| WR | Latrell Caples | Gr. | Boise State |
| WR | Pofele Ashlock | Jr. | Hawaii |
| WR | Nick Cenacle | Sr. | Hawaii |
| TE | Matt Lauter | Sr. | Boise State |
| OL | Kage Casey | Jr. | Boise State |
| OL | Mason Randolph | Sr. | Boise State |
| OL | Peseti Lapuaho | Sr. | San Jose State |
| OL | Caden Barnett | Sr. | Wyoming |
| OL | Jack Walsh | Sr. | Wyoming |
First Team Defense
| DL | Braxton Fely | Sr. | Boise State |
| DL | Jayden Virgin-Morgan | Jr. | Boise State |
| DL | Trey White | Jr. | San Diego State |
| DL | Gafa Faga | Sr. | San Jose State |
| LB | Marco Notarainni | Sr. | Boise State |
| LB | Tano Letuli | Jr. | San Diego State |
| LB | Jordan Pollard | Sr. | San Jose State |
| LB | Marsel McDuffie | Sr. | UNLV |
| DB | Ty Benefield | Jr. | Boise State |
| DB | A'Marion McCoy | Gr. | Boise State |
| DB | Al'zillion Hamilton | Sr. | Fresno State |
| DB | Ike Larsen | Sr. | Utah State |
First Team Special Teams
| PK | Gabe Plascencia | Sr. | San Diego State |
| P | Luke Freer | Sr. | Air Force |
| PR | Marcus Bellon | Sr. | Nevada |
| KR | Abraham Williams | Sr. | New Mexico |

== Rankings ==
| | | Pre | Wk 1 | Wk 2 | Wk 3 | Wk 4 | Wk 5 | Wk 6 | Wk 7 | Wk 8 | Wk 9 | Wk 10 | Wk 11 | Wk 12 | Wk 13 | Wk 14 | Wk 15 | Final |
|---|---|---|---|---|---|---|---|---|---|---|---|---|---|---|---|---|---|---|
| Air Force | AP | — | — | — | — | — | — | — | — | — | — | — | — | — | — | — | — | — |
| Air Force | C | — | — | — | — | — | — | — | — | — | — | — | — | — | — | — | — | — |
| Air Force | CFP | Not released | | | | | | | | | | — | — | — | — | — | — | |
| Boise State | AP | 25 | — | — | — | — | — | — | — | RV | — | — | — | — | — | — | RV | RV |
| Boise State | C | 25 | — | — | — | — | — | — | — | RV | RV | — | — | — | — | — | RV | RV |
| Boise State | CFP | Not released | | | | | | | | | | — | — | — | — | — | — | |
| Colorado State | AP | — | — | — | — | — | — | — | — | — | — | — | — | — | — | — | — | — |
| Colorado State | C | — | — | — | — | — | — | — | — | — | — | — | — | — | — | — | — | — |
| Colorado State | CFP | Not released | | | | | | | | | | — | — | — | — | — | — | |
| Fresno State | AP | — | — | — | — | — | — | — | — | — | — | — | — | — | — | — | — | — |
| Fresno State | C | — | — | — | — | — | — | — | — | — | — | — | — | — | — | — | — | — |
| Fresno State | CFP | Not released | | | | | | | | | | — | — | — | — | — | — | |
| Hawaii | AP | — | — | — | — | — | — | — | — | — | — | — | — | — | — | — | — | RV |
| Hawaii | C | — | — | — | — | — | — | — | — | — | — | — | — | — | — | — | — | — |
| Hawaii | CFP | Not released | | | | | | | | | | — | — | — | — | — | — | |
| Nevada | AP | — | — | — | — | — | — | — | — | — | — | — | — | — | — | — | — | — |
| Nevada | C | — | — | — | — | — | — | — | — | — | — | — | — | — | — | — | — | — |
| Nevada | CFP | Not released | | | | | | | | | | — | — | — | — | — | — | |
| New Mexico | AP | — | — | — | — | — | — | — | — | — | — | — | — | — | — | RV | RV | — |
| New Mexico | C | — | — | — | — | — | — | — | — | — | — | — | — | — | — | RV | — | — |
| New Mexico | CFP | Not released | | | | | | | | | | — | — | — | — | — | — | |
| San Diego State | AP | — | — | — | — | — | — | — | RV | RV | RV | RV | RV | RV | RV | RV | — | — |
| San Diego State | C | — | — | — | — | — | — | — | RV | RV | RV | RV | RV | RV | RV | RV | RV | — |
| San Diego State | CFP | Not released | | | | | | | | | | — | — | — | — | — | — | |
| San Jose State | AP | — | — | — | — | — | — | — | — | — | — | — | — | — | — | — | — | — |
| San Jose State | C | — | — | — | — | — | — | — | — | — | — | — | — | — | — | — | — | — |
| San Jose State | CFP | Not released | | | | | | | | | | — | — | — | — | — | — | |
| UNLV | AP | RV | RV | RV | RV | RV | RV | RV | RV | — | — | — | RV | RV | RV | RV | RV | — |
| UNLV | C | RV | — | RV | RV | RV | RV | RV | RV | RV | RV | — | — | — | RV | RV | RV | — |
| UNLV | CFP | Not released | | | | | | | | | | — | — | — | — | — | — | |
| Utah State | AP | — | — | — | — | — | — | — | — | — | — | — | — | — | — | — | — | — |
| Utah State | C | — | — | — | — | — | — | — | — | — | — | — | — | — | — | — | — | — |
| Utah State | CFP | Not released | | | | | | | | | | — | — | — | — | — | — | |
| Wyoming | AP | — | — | — | — | — | — | — | — | — | — | — | — | — | — | — | — | — |
| Wyoming | C | — | — | — | — | — | — | — | — | — | — | — | — | — | — | — | — | — |
| Wyoming | CFP | Not released | | | | | | | | | | — | — | — | — | — | — | |

Legend
| | Improvement in ranking |
| | Drop in ranking |
| | Not ranked previous week |
| | No change in ranking from previous week |
| RV | Received votes but were not ranked in Top 25 of poll |
| т | Tied with team above or below also with this symbol |

== Schedule ==
The schedule was released on February 20, 2025.

Index to colors and formatting
MW member won
MW member lost
MW teams in **bold**

All times Mountain time.

=== Week 0 ===
| Date | Time | Visiting team | Home team | Site | TV | Result | Attendance | Ref. |
|---|---|---|---|---|---|---|---|---|
| August 23 | 2:00 p.m. | Idaho State | **UNLV** | Allegiant Stadium • Paradise, NV | KVVU | **W** 38–31 | 25,723 | |
| August 23 | 4:30 p.m. | **Fresno State** | Kansas | David Booth Kansas Memorial Stadium • Lawrence, KS | FOX | **L** 7–31 | 41,525 | |
| August 23 | 5:30 p.m. | Stanford | **Hawaii** | Clarence T. C. Ching Athletics Complex • Honolulu, HI | CBS | **W** 23–20 | 15,194 | |
^{#}Rankings from AP Poll released prior to game. All times are in Mountain Time.

=== Week 1 ===
| Date | Time | Visiting team | Home team | Site | TV | Result | Attendance | Ref. |
|---|---|---|---|---|---|---|---|---|
| August 28 | 3:30 p.m. | No. 25 **Boise State** | South Florida | Raymond James Stadium • Tampa, FL | ESPN | **L** 7–34 | 34,707 | |
| August 28 | 5:00 p.m. | **Wyoming** | Akron | InfoCision Stadium–Summa Field • Akron, OH | ESPN+ | **W** 10–0 | 9,138 | |
| August 28 | 8:00 p.m. | No. 24 (FCS) Stony Brook | **San Diego State** | Snapdragon Stadium • San Diego, CA | KUSI | **W** 42–0 | 20,624 | |
| August 29 | 7:30 p.m. | **UNLV** | Sam Houston | Shell Energy Stadium • Houston, TX | CBSSN | **W** 38–21 | 5,837 | |
| August 29 | 8:30 p.m. | Central Michigan | **San Jose State** | CEFCU Stadium • San Jose, CA | FS1 | **L** 14–16 | 14,877 | |
| August 30 | 1:30 p.m. | Bucknell | **Air Force** | Falcon Stadium • USAF Academy, CO | CBSSN | **W** 49–13 | 30,207 | |
| August 30 | 1:30 p.m. | **Nevada** | No. 2 Penn State | Beaver Stadium • University Park, PA | CBS | **L** 11–46 | 106,915 | |
| August 30 | 5:30 p.m. | **New Mexico** | No. 14 Michigan | Michigan Stadium • Ann Arbor, MI | NBC | **L** 17–34 | 110,648 | |
| August 30 | 5:30 p.m. | UTEP | **Utah State** | Maverik Stadium • Logan, UT | CBSSN | **W** 28–16 | 16,448 | |
| August 30 | 7:30 p.m. | Georgia Southern | **Fresno State** | Valley Children's Stadium • Fresno, CA | FS1 | **W** 42–14 | 36,801 | |
| August 30 | 8:30 p.m. | **Hawaii** | Arizona | Arizona Stadium • Tucson, AZ | TNT | **L** 6–40 | 42,423 | |
| August 30 | 9:00 p.m. | **Colorado State** | Washington | Husky Stadium • Seattle, WA | BTN | **L** 21–38 | 67,778 | |
^{#}Rankings from AP Poll released prior to game. All times are in Mountain Time.

=== Week 2 ===
| Date | Time | Visiting team | Home team | Site | TV | Result | Attendance | Ref. |
|---|---|---|---|---|---|---|---|---|
| September 5 | 7:00 p.m. | Eastern Washington | **Boise State** | Albertsons Stadium • Boise, ID | FS1 | **W** 51–14 | 32,887 | |
| September 6 | 10:00 a.m. | **San Jose State** | No. 7 Texas | Darrell K Royal–Texas Memorial Stadium • Austin, TX | ABC | **L** 7–38 | 100,841 | |
| September 6 | 10:45 a.m. | **Utah State** | No. 19 Texas A&M | Kyle Field • College Station, TX | SECN | **L** 22–44 | 100,026 | |
| September 6 | 1:00 p.m. | Idaho State | **New Mexico** | University Stadium • Albuquerque, NM | Altitude | **W** 32–22 | 17,639 | |
| September 6 | 1:30 p.m. | **Fresno State** | Oregon State | Reser Stadium • Corvallis, OR | The CW | **W** 36–27 | 28,068 | |
| September 6 | 2:00 p.m. | Northern Iowa | **Wyoming** | War Memorial Stadium • Laramie, WY | Altitude2 | **W** 31–7 | 25,009 | |
| September 6 | 3:00 p.m. | No. 18 (FCS) Sacramento State | **Nevada** | Mackay Stadium • Reno, NV | KNSN-TV | **W** 20–17 | 20,535 | |
| September 6 | 5:00 p.m. | Northern Colorado | **Colorado State** | Canvas Stadium • Fort Collins, CO | Altitude | **W** 21–17 | 37,023 | |
| September 6 | 6:00 p.m. | UCLA | **UNLV** | Allegiant Stadium • Paradise, NV | CBSSN | **W** 30–23 | 36,117 | |
| September 6 | 8:15 p.m. | **San Diego State** | Washington State | Martin Stadium • Pullman, WA | The CW | **L** 13–36 | 24,330 | |
| September 6 | 9:59 p.m. | Sam Houston | **Hawaii** | Clarence T. C. Ching Athletics Complex • Honolulu, HI | Spectrum Sports | **W** 37–20 | 11,625 | |
^{#}Rankings from AP Poll released prior to game. All times are in Mountain Time.

=== Week 3 ===
| Date | Time | Visiting team | Home team | Site | TV | Result | Attendance | Ref. |
|---|---|---|---|---|---|---|---|---|
| September 12 | 8:00 p.m. | **New Mexico** | UCLA | Rose Bowl • Pasadena, CA | BTN | **W** 35–10 | 31,163 | |
| September 13 | 3:00 p.m. | Middle Tennessee | **Nevada** | Mackay Stadium • Reno, NV | KNSN-TV | **L** 13–14 | 16,808 | |
| September 13 | 6:00 p.m. | No. 20 Utah | **Wyoming** | War Memorial Stadium • Laramie, WY | CBSSN | **L** 6–31 | 23,500 | |
| September 13 | 7:45 p.m. | **Air Force** | **Utah State** | Maverik Stadium • Logan, UT | FS1 | **USU** 49–30 | 17,124 | |
| September 13 | 8:00 p.m. | Southern | **Fresno State** | Valley Children's Stadium • Fresno, CA | KGPE | **W** 56–7 | 37,210 | |
| September 13 | 9:59 p.m. | Portland State | **Hawaii** | Clarence T. C. Ching Athletics Complex • Honolulu, HI | Spectrum Sports | **W** 23–3 | 11,936 | |
^{#}Rankings from AP Poll released prior to game. All times are in Mountain Time.

=== Week 4 ===
| Date | Time | Visiting team | Home team | Site | TV | Result | Attendance | Ref. |
|---|---|---|---|---|---|---|---|---|
| September 20 | 10:00 a.m. | **UNLV** | Miami (OH) | Yager Stadium • Oxford, OH | ESPNU | **W** 41–38 | 12,625 | |
| September 20 | 3:00 p.m. | No. 8 (FCS) Idaho | **San Jose State** | CEFCU Stadium • San Jose, CA | NBCSBA | **W** 30–27 | 13,155 | |
| September 20 | 5:00 p.m. | **Nevada** | Western Kentucky | Houchens Industries–L. T. Smith Stadium • Bowling Green, KY | ESPN+ | **L** 16–31 | 17,247 | |
| September 20 | 5:00 p.m. | **Boise State** | **Air Force** | Falcon Stadium • USAF Academy, CO | CBSSN | **BSU** 49–37 | 24,046 | |
| September 20 | 6:00 p.m. | McNeese | **Utah State** | Maverik Stadium • Logan, UT | KMYU | **W** 48–7 | 16,273 | |
| September 20 | 7:30 p.m. | UTSA | **Colorado State** | Canvas Stadium • Fort Collins, CO | FS1 | **L** 16–17 | 32,061 | |
| September 20 | 8:15 p.m. | **Wyoming** | Colorado | Folsom Field • Boulder, CO | ESPN | **L** 20–37 | 53,442 | |
| September 20 | 8:30 p.m. | California | **San Diego State** | Snapdragon Stadium • San Diego, CA | CBSSN | **W** 34–0 | 31,369 | |
| September 20 | 9:59 p.m. | **Fresno State** | **Hawaii** | Clarence T. C. Ching Athletics Complex • Honolulu, HI (rivlary) | Spectrum Sports | **FRES** 23–21 | 13,789 | |
^{#}Rankings from AP Poll released prior to game. All times are in Mountain Time.

=== Week 5 ===
| Date | Time | Visiting team | Home team | Site | TV | Result | Attendance | Ref. |
|---|---|---|---|---|---|---|---|---|
| September 27 | 10:45 a.m. | **Utah State** | No. 18 Vanderbilt | FirstBank Stadium • Nashville, TN | SECN | **L** 35–55 | 33,688 | |
| September 27 | 1:30 p.m. | **San Diego State** | Northern Illinois | Huskie Stadium • DeKalb, IL | ESPN+ | **W** 6–3 | 13,512 | |
| September 27 | 2:00 p.m. | **Hawaii** | **Air Force** | Falcon Stadium • USAF Academy, CO (rivalry) | FS1 | **HAW** 44–35 | 22,677 | |
| September 27 | 2:00 p.m. | New Mexico State | **New Mexico** | University Stadium • Albuquerque, NM (Rio Grande Rivalry) | Altitude | **W** 38–20 | 37,440 | |
| September 27 | 5:30 p.m. | Appalachian State | **Boise State** | Albertsons Stadium • Boise, ID | FS1 | **W** 47–14 | 32,904 | |
| September 27 | 5:30 p.m. | Washington State | **Colorado State** | Canvas Stadium • Fort Collins, CO | CBSSN | **L** 3–20 | 29,019 | |
| September 27 | 5:30 p.m. | **San Jose State** | Stanford | Stanford Stadium • Stanford, CA (Bill Walsh Legacy Game) | ACCN | **L** 29–30 | 26,357 | |
^{#}Rankings from AP Poll released prior to game. All times are in Mountain Time.

=== Week 6 ===
| Date | Time | Visiting team | Home team | Site | TV | Result | Attendance | Ref. |
|---|---|---|---|---|---|---|---|---|
| October 3 | 8:00 p.m. | New Mexico | **San Jose State** | CEFCU Stadium • San Jose, CA | FS1 | **SJSU** 35–28 | 12,109 | |
| October 3 | 8:30 p.m. | Colorado State | **San Diego State** | Snapdragon Stadium • San Diego, CA | CBSSN | **SDSU** 45–24 | 29,019 | |
| October 4 | 10:00 a.m. | Air Force | Navy | Navy–Marine Corps Memorial Stadium • Annapolis, MD (Commander-in-Chief's Trophy) | CBS | **L** 31–34 | 37,517 | |
| October 4 | 1:30 p.m. | Boise State | No. 21 Notre Dame | Notre Dame Stadium • Notre Dame, IN | NBC | **L** 7–28 | 77,622 | |
| October 4 | 5:00 p.m. | UNLV | **Wyoming** | War Memorial Stadium • Laramie, WY | CBSSN | **UNLV** 31–17 | 19,861 | |
| October 4 | 8:30 p.m. | Nevada | **Fresno State** | Valley Children's Stadium • Fresno, CA | CBSSN | **FRES** 20–17 | 40,005 | |
^{#}Rankings from AP Poll released prior to game. All times are in Mountain Time.

=== Week 7 ===
| Date | Time | Visiting team | Home team | Site | TV | Result | Attendance | Ref. |
|---|---|---|---|---|---|---|---|---|
| October 11 | 1:30 p.m. | Air Force | UNLV | Allegiant Stadium • Paradise, NV | CBSSN | **UNLV** 51–48 | 32,932 | |
| October 11 | 7:45 p.m. | New Mexico | Boise State | Albertsons Stadium • Boise, ID | FS1 | **BSU** 41–25 | 32,982 | |
| October 10 | 7:00 p.m. | Fresno State | Colorado State | Canvas Stadium • Fort Collins, CO | CBSSN | **CSU** 49–21 | 27,874 | |
| October 11 | 9:59 p.m. | Utah State | Hawaii | Clarence T. C. Ching Athletics Complex • Honolulu, HI | Spectrum Sports | **HAW** 44–26 | 13,023 | |
| October 11 | 8:30 p.m. | San Diego State | Nevada | Mackay Stadium • Reno, NV | CBSSN | **SDSU** 44–10 | 19,473 | |
| October 11 | 5:00 p.m. | San Jose State | Wyoming | War Memorial Stadium • Laramie, WY | CBSSN | **WYO** 35–28 | 20,970 | |
^{#}Rankings from AP Poll released prior to game. All times are in Mountain Time.

=== Week 8 ===
| Date | Time | Visiting team | Home team | Site | TV | Result | Attendance | Ref. |
|---|---|---|---|---|---|---|---|---|
| October 17 | 7:00 p.m. | **San Jose State** | **Utah State** | Maverik Stadium • Logan, UT | CBSSN | **USU** 30–25 | 22,710 | |
| October 18 | 1:30 p.m. | **Wyoming** | **Air Force** | Falcon Stadium • USAF Academy, CO | CBSSN | **AF** 24–21 | 23,401 | |
| October 18 | 1:30 p.m. | **UNLV** | **Boise State** | Albertsons Stadium • Boise, ID | FS1 | **BSU** 56–31 | 32,927 | |
| October 18 | 5:00 p.m. | **Hawaii** | **Colorado State** | Canvas Stadium • Fort Collins, CO | Spectrum Sports | **HAW** 31–19 | 40,416 | |
| October 18 | 7:45 p.m. | **Nevada** | **New Mexico** | University Stadium • Albuquerque, NM | FS1 | **UNM** 24–22 | 18,233 | |
^{#}Rankings from AP Poll released prior to game. All times are in Mountain Time.

=== Week 9 ===
| Date | Time | Visiting team | Home team | Site | TV | Result | Attendance | Ref. |
|---|---|---|---|---|---|---|---|---|
| October 24 | 8:00 p.m. | **Boise State** | **Nevada** | Mackay Stadium • Reno, NV (rivalry) | CBSSN | **BSU** 24–3 | 18,029 | |
| October 25 | 1:00 p.m. | **Utah State** | **New Mexico** | University Stadium • Albuquerque, NM | Altitude | **UNM** 33–14 | 20,097 | |
| October 25 | 1:30 p.m. | **San Diego State** | **Fresno State** | Valley Children's Stadium • Fresno, CA (rivalry) | FS1 | **SDSU** 23–0 | 41,535 | |
| October 25 | 5:30 p.m. | **Colorado State** | **Wyoming** | War Memorial Stadium • Laramie, WY (Border War) | CBSSN | **WYO** 28–0 | 25,609 | |
^{#}Rankings from AP Poll released prior to game. All times are in Mountain Time.

=== Week 10 ===
| Date | Time | Visiting team | Home team | Site | TV | Result | Attendance | Ref. |
|---|---|---|---|---|---|---|---|---|
| November 1 | 10:00 a.m. | Army | **Air Force** | Falcon Stadium • USAF Academy, CO (Commander-in-Chief's Trophy) | CBS | **L** 17–20 | 39,441 | |
| November 1 | 1:00 p.m. | **New Mexico** | **UNLV** | Allegiant Stadium • Paradise, NV | KVVU | **UNM** 40–35 | 25,972 | |
| November 1 | 1:30 p.m. | **Fresno State** | **Boise State** | Albertsons Stadium • Boise, ID (rivalry) | FS1 | **FRES** 30–7 | 32,826 | |
| November 1 | 5:00 p.m. | **Wyoming** | **San Diego State** | Snapdragon Stadium • San Diego, CA | CBSSN | **SDSU** 24–7 | 24,325 | |
| November 1 | 8:30 p.m. | **Hawaii** | **San Jose State** | CEFCU Stadium • San Jose, CA (Dick Tomey Legacy Game) | CBSSN | **SJSU** 45–38 | 16,012 | |
^{#}Rankings from AP Poll released prior to game. All times are in Mountain Time.

=== Week 11 ===
| Date | Time | Visiting team | Home team | Site | TV | Result | Attendance | Ref. |
|---|---|---|---|---|---|---|---|---|
| November 8 | 4:00 p.m. | **Air Force** | **San Jose State** | CEFCU Stadium • San Jose, CA | FS1 | **AF** 26–16 | 13,637 | |
| November 8 | 5:30 p.m. | **Nevada** | **Utah State** | Maverik Stadium • Logan, UT | CBSSN | **USU** 51–14 | 19,418 | |
| November 8 | 7:30 p.m. | **UNLV** | **Colorado State** | Canvas Stadium • Fort Collins, CO | FS1 | **UNLV** 42–10 | 27,970 | |
| November 8 | 9:00 p.m. | **San Diego State** | **Hawaii** | Clarence T. C. Ching Athletics Complex • Honolulu, HI | Spectrum Sports | **HAW** 38–6 | 15,194 | |
^{#}Rankings from College Football Playoff. All times are in Mountain Time.

=== Week 12 ===
| Date | Time | Visiting team | Home team | Site | TV | Result | Attendance | Ref. |
|---|---|---|---|---|---|---|---|---|
| November 15 | 10:00 a.m. | Air Force | UConn | Pratt & Whitney Stadium at Rentschler Field • East Hartford, CT | CBSSN | **L** 16–26 | | |
| November 15 | 1:00 p.m. | Colorado State | **New Mexico** | University Stadium • Albuquerque, NM | Altitude | **UNM** 20–17 | | |
| November 15 | 1:30 p.m. | San Jose State | **Nevada** | Mackay Stadium • Reno, NV | CBSSN | **NEV** 55–10 | | |
| November 15 | 5:00 p.m. | Utah State | **UNLV** | Allegiant Stadium • Paradise, NV | CBSSN | **UNLV** 29–26 ^{2OT} | | |
| November 15 | 8:30 p.m. | Boise State | **San Diego State** | Snapdragon Stadium • San Diego, CA | CBSSN | **SDSU** 17–7 | | |
| November 15 | 8:30 p.m. | Wyoming | **Fresno State** | Valley Children's Stadium • Fresno, CA | FS1 | **FRES** 24–3 | | |
^{#}Rankings from College Football Playoff. All times are in Mountain Time.

=== Week 13 ===
| Date | Time | Visiting team | Home team | Site | TV | Result | Attendance | Ref. |
|---|---|---|---|---|---|---|---|---|
| November 21 | 8:30 p.m. | Hawaii | UNLV | Allegiant Stadium • Paradise, NV | FS1 | **UNLV** 38–10 | | |
| November 22 | 12:00 p.m. | Nevada | Wyoming | War Memorial Stadium • Laramie, WY | Altitude | **NEV** 13–7 | | |
| November 22 | 5:00 p.m. | New Mexico | Air Force | Falcon Stadium • USAF Academy, CO | CBSSN | **UNM** 20–3 | | |
| November 22 | 5:00 p.m. | Colorado State | Boise State | Albertsons Stadium • Boise, ID | FS1 | **BSU** 49–21 | | |
| November 22 | 8:30 p.m. | Utah State | Fresno State | Valley Children's Stadium • Fresno, CA | CBSSN | **USU** 28–17 | | |
| November 22 | 8:30 p.m. | San Jose State | San Diego State | Snapdragon Stadium • San Diego, CA | FS1 | **SDSU** 25–3 | | |
^{#}Rankings from College Football Playoff. All times are in Mountain Time.

=== Week 14 ===
| Date | Time | Visiting team | Home team | Site | TV | Result | Attendance | Ref. |
|---|---|---|---|---|---|---|---|---|
| November 28 | 1:00 p.m. | Air Force | Colorado State | Canvas Stadium • Fort Collins, CO (rivalry) | FS1 | **AF** 42–21 | | |
| November 28 | 1:30 p.m. | San Diego State | New Mexico | University Stadium • Albquerque, NM | CBSSN | **UNM** 23–17 ^{2OT} | | |
| November 28 | 2:00 p.m. | Boise State | Utah State | Maverik Stadium • Logan, UT | CBS | **BSU** 25–24 | | |
| November 29 | 7:00 p.m. | UNLV | Nevada | Mackay Stadium • Reno, NV (Fremont Cannon) | CBSSN | **UNLV** 42–17 | | |
| November 29 | 8:30 p.m. | Fresno State | San Jose State | CEFCU Stadium • San Jose, CA (Battle for the Valley) | FS1 | **FRES** 41–14 | | |
| November 29 | 9:00 p.m. | Wyoming | Hawaii | Clarence T. C. Ching Athletics Complex • Honolulu, HI (rivalry) | Spectrum Sports | **HAW** 27–7 | | |
^{#}Rankings from College Football Playoff. All times are in Mountain Time.

=== Championship game ===
| Date | Time | Visiting team | Home team | Site | TV | Result | Attendance | Ref. |
|---|---|---|---|---|---|---|---|---|
| December 5 | 6:00 p.m. | **UNLV** | **Boise State** | Alberstons Stadium • Boise, ID (Mountain West Conference Championship Game) | FOX | BSU 38–21 | 27,152 | |
^{#}Rankings from College Football Playoff. All times are in Mountain Time.

== Postseason ==
=== Bowl Games ===
Legend
| Mountain West win |
| Mountain West loss |

| Bowl game | Date | Site | Television | Time (MST) | Mountain West team | Opponent | Score | Attendance |
|---|---|---|---|---|---|---|---|---|
| LA Bowl | December 13 | SoFi Stadium • Inglewood, CA | ABC | 6:00 p.m. | Boise State | Washington | L 10–38 | 23,269 |
| Famous Idaho Potato Bowl | December 22 | Albertsons Stadium • Boise, ID | ESPN | 12:00 p.m. | Utah State | Washington State | L 21–34 | 17,031 |
| Frisco Bowl | December 23 | Ford Center at The Star • Frisco, TX | ESPN | 7:00 p.m. | UNLV | Ohio | L 10–17 | 6,521 |
| Hawaii Bowl | December 24 | Clarence T. C. Ching Athletics Complex • Honolulu, HI | ESPN | 6:00 p.m. | Hawaii | California | W 35–31 | 15,194 |
| Rate Bowl | December 26 | Chase Field • Phoenix, AZ | ESPN | 2:30 p.m. | New Mexico | Minnesota | L 17–20 ^{OT} | 27,439 |
| Arizona Bowl | December 27 | Casino Del Sol Stadium • Tucson, AZ | The CW | 2:30 p.m. | Fresno State | Miami (OH) | W 18–3 | |
| New Mexico Bowl | December 27 | University Stadium • Albuquerque, NM | ESPN | 3:45 p.m. | San Diego State | North Texas | L 47–49 | |

== Mountain West records vs. other conferences ==
2025–2026 records against non-conference foes:

Regular season

| Power Four Conferences | Record |
|---|---|
| ACC | 2–1 |
| Big 12 | 0–4 |
| Big Ten | 2–3 |
| Notre Dame | 0–1 |
| SEC | 0–3 |
| Power 4 Total | 4–12 |
| Other FBS Conferences | Record |
| American | 0–4 |
| CUSA | 3–2 |
| Independents (Excluding Notre Dame) | 0–1 |
| MAC | 3–1 |
| Pac-12 | 1–2 |
| Sun Belt | 2–0 |
| Other FBS Total | 9–10 |
| FCS Opponents | Record |
| Football Championship Subdivision | 12–0 |
| Total Non-Conference Record | 25–22 |

=== Mountain West vs Power 4 matchups ===
This is a list of games the Mountain West has scheduled versus power conference teams (ACC, Big Ten, Big 12, Notre Dame and SEC). All rankings are from the current AP Poll at the time of the game.

| Date | Conference | Visitor | Home | Site | Score |
|---|---|---|---|---|---|
| August 23 | Big 12 | Fresno State | Kansas | David Booth Kansas Memorial Stadium • Lawrence, KS | L 7–31 |
| August 23 | ACC | Stanford | Hawaii | Clarence T. C. Ching Athletics Complex • Honolulu, HI | W 23–20 |
| August 30 | Big Ten | Colorado State | Washington | Husky Stadium • Seattle, WA | L 21–38 |
| August 30 | Big 12 | Hawaii | Arizona | Arizona Stadium • Tucson, AZ | L 6–40 |
| August 30 | Big Ten | Nevada | No. 2 Penn State | Beaver Stadium • University Park, PA | L 11–46 |
| August 30 | Big Ten | New Mexico | No. 14 Michigan | Michigan Stadium • Ann Arbor, MI | L 17–34 |
| September 6 | SEC | San Jose State | No. 7 Texas | Darrell K Royal–Texas Memorial Stadium • Austin, TX | L 7–38 |
| September 6 | Big Ten | UCLA | UNLV | Allegiant Stadium • Paradise, NV | W 30–23 |
| September 6 | SEC | Utah State | No. 19 Texas A&M | Kyle Field • College Station, TX | L 22–42 |
| September 12 | Big Ten | New Mexico | UCLA | Rose Bowl • Pasadena, CA | W 35–10 |
| September 13 | Big 12 | No. 20 Utah | Wyoming | War Memorial Stadium • Laramie, WY | L 6–31 |
| September 20 | ACC | California | San Diego State | Snapdragon Stadium • San Diego, CA | W 34–0 |
| September 20 | Big 12 | Wyoming | Colorado | Folsom Field • Boulder, CO | L 20–37 |
| September 27 | ACC | San Jose State | Stanford | Stanford Stadium • Stanford, CA | L 29–30 |
| September 27 | SEC | Utah State | Vanderbilt | FirstBank Stadium • Nashville, TN | L 35–55 |
| October 4 | Independent | Boise State | Notre Dame | Notre Dame Stadium • Notre Dame, IN | L 7–28 |

=== Mountain West vs other FBS matchups ===
The following games include Mountain West teams competing against teams from the American, C-USA, MAC, Pac-12 or Sun Belt.

| Date | Conference | Visitor | Home | Site | Score |
|---|---|---|---|---|---|
| August 28 | American | No. 25 Boise State | South Florida | Raymond James Stadium • Tampa, FL | L 7–34 |
| August 29 | MAC | Central Michigan | San Jose State | CEFCU Stadium • San Jose, CA | L 14–16 |
| August 30 | Sun Belt | Georgia Southern | Fresno State | Valley Children's Stadium • Fresno, CA | W 42–14 |
| August 30 | C-USA | UNLV | Sam Houston | Shell Energy Stadium • Houston, TX | W 38–21 |
| August 30 | C-USA | UTEP | Utah State | Maverik Stadium • Logan, UT | W 28–16 |
| August 30 | MAC | Wyoming | Akron | InfoCision Stadium–Summa Field • Akron, OH | W 10–0 |
| September 6 | Pac-12 | Fresno State | Oregon State | Reser Stadium • Corvallis, OR | W 36–27 |
| September 6 | C-USA | Sam Houston | Hawaii | Clarence T. C. Ching Athletics Complex • Honolulu, HI | W 37–20 |
| September 6 | Pac-12 | San Diego State | Washington State | Martin Stadium • Pullman, WA | L 13–36 |
| September 13 | C-USA | Middle Tennessee | Nevada | Mackay Stadium • Reno, NV | L 13–14 |
| September 20 | American | UTSA | Colorado State | Canvas Stadium • Fort Collins, CO | L 16–17 |
| September 20 | C-USA | Nevada | Western Kentucky | Houchens Industries–L. T. Smith Stadium • Bowling Green, KY | L 16–31 |
| September 20 | MAC | UNLV | Miami (OH) | Yager Stadium • Oxford, OH | W 41–38 |
| September 27 | Sun Belt | Appalachian State | Boise State | Albertsons Stadium • Boise, ID | W 47–14 |
| September 27 | Pac-12 | Washington State | Colorado State | Canvas Stadium • Fort Collins, CO | L 3–20 |
| September 27 | C-USA | New Mexico State | New Mexico | University Stadium • Albquerque, NM | W 38–20 |
| September 27 | MAC | San Diego State | Northern Illinois | Huskie Stadium • DeKalb, IL | W 6–3 |
| October 4 | American | Air Force | Navy | Navy–Marine Corps Memorial Stadium • Annapolis, MD | L 31–34 |
| November 1 | American | Army | Air Force | Falcon Stadium • USAF Academy, CO | L 17–20 |

=== Mountain West vs FBS independents matchups ===
The following games include Mountain West teams competing against FBS Independents, which only includes UConn for 2025.

| Date | Visitor | Home | Site | Score |
|---|---|---|---|---|
| November 15 | Air Force | UConn | Pratt & Whitney Stadium at Rentschler Field • East Hartford, CT | L 16–26 |

=== Mountain West vs. FCS matchups ===
The following games include Mountain West teams competing against FCS schools.

| Date | Visitor | Home | Site | Score |
|---|---|---|---|---|
| August 23 | Idaho State | UNLV | Allegiant Stadium • Paradise, NV | W 38–31 |
| August 28 | No. 24 (FCS) Stony Brook | San Diego State | Snapdragon Stadium • San Diego, CA | W 42–0 |
| August 30 | Bucknell | Air Force | Falcon Stadium • USAF Academy, CO | W 49–13 |
| September 6 | Eastern Washington | Boise State | Albertsons Stadium • Boise, ID | W 51–14 |
| September 6 | Northern Colorado | Colorado State | Canvas Stadium • Fort Collins, CO | W 21–17 |
| September 6 | No. 18 (FCS) Sacramento State | Nevada | Mackay Stadium • Reno, NV | W 20–17 |
| September 6 | Idaho State | New Mexico | University Stadium • Albuquerque, NM | W 32–22 |
| September 6 | Northern Iowa | Wyoming | War Memorial Stadium • Laramie, WY | W 31–7 |
| September 13 | Southern | Fresno State | Valley Children's Stadium • Fresno, CA | W 56–7 |
| September 13 | Portland State | Hawaii | Clarence T. C. Ching Athletics Complex • Honolulu, HI | W 23–3 |
| September 20 | No. 8 (FCS) Idaho | San Jose State | CEFCU Stadium • San Jose, CA | W 31–28 |
| September 20 | McNeese | Utah State | Maverik Stadium • Logan, UT | W 48–7 |

== Awards and honors ==
=== Player of the week honors ===
| Week | Offensive | | | Defensive | | | Special Teams | | | Freshman | | |
| Week | Player | Team | Position | Player | Team | Position | Player | Team | Position | Player | Team | Position |
|---|---|---|---|---|---|---|---|---|---|---|---|---|
| Week 0 | Micah Alejado | Hawaii | QB | Kilinahe Mendiola-Jensen | Hawaii | S | Kansei Matsuzawa | Hawaii | K | Micah Alejado | Hawaii | QB |
| Week 1 | Anthony Colandrea | UNLV | QB | Aamaris Brown | UNLV | DB | Tanner Rinker | Utah State | K | Jalen Dupree | Colorado State | RB |
| Week 2 | Anthony Colandrea (2) | UNLV | QB | Jadon Pearson | Fresno State | LB | Dylan Lynch | Fresno State | K | Sire Gaines | Boise State | RB |
| Week 3 | Bryson Barnes | Utah State | QB | Jaxton Eck | New Mexico | LB | Kansei Matsuzawa (2) | Hawaii | K | Samuel Harris | Wyoming | RB |
| Week 4 | Dylan Riley | Boise State | RB | Dalesean Staley | San Diego State | S | Ramon Villela | UNLV | K | Samuel Harris (2) | Wyoming | RB |
| Week 5 | Micah Alejado (2) | Hawaii | QB | Boen Phelps | Boise State | LB | Kansei Matsuzawa (3) | Hawaii | K | Micah Alejado (2) | Hawaii | QB |
| Week 6 | Walker Eget | San Jose State | QB | Jalen Bainer | San Jose State | LB | Kayden McGee | UNLV | WR | Kayden McGee | UNLV | WR |
| Week 7 | Anthony Colandrea (3) | UNLV | QB | Jamih Otis | Hawaii | LB | Kansei Matsuzawa (4) | Hawaii | K | Micah Alejado (3) | Hawaii | QB |
| Week 8 | Dylan Riley (2) | Boise State | RB | Roger Jones Jr. | Air Force | DB | Reagan Tubbs | Air Force | K | Micah Alejado (4) | Hawaii | QB |
| Week 9 | Cade Keith | New Mexico | TE | Jeremiah Earby | Boise State | CB | Gabe Plascencia | San Diego State | K | Cade Keith | New Mexico | TE |
| Week 10 | Walker Eget (2) | San Jose State | QB | Simeon Harris | Fresno State | NB | Luke Drzewiecki | New Mexico | K | Steve Chavez-Soto | San Jose State | RB |
| Week 11 | Jackson Harris | Hawaii | WR | Brevin Hamblin | Utah State | S | Cam Barfield | Hawaii | RB/KR | Micah Alejado (5) | Hawaii | QB |
| Week 12 | Caleb Ramseur | Nevada | RB | Austin Brawley | New Mexico | S | Luke Drzewiecki (2) | New Mexico | K | Carter Jones | Nevada | QB |
| Week 13 | Anthony Colandrea (4) | UNLV | QB | Jeremiah Earby (2) | Boise State | CB | Luke Drzewiecki (3) | New Mexico | K | Sire Gaines (2) | Boise State | RB |
| Week 14 | Max Cutforth | Boise State | QB | Austin Brawley (2) | New Mexico | S | Dylan Lynch (2) | Fresno State | K | Micah Alejado (6) | Hawaii | QB |

=== Mountain West Individual Awards ===
The following individuals received postseason honors as voted by the Mountain West Conference football coaches at the end of the season.

| Award | Player | School |
|---|---|---|
| Offensive Player of the Year | Anthony Colandrea, QB | UNLV |
| Defensive Player of the Year | Jaxton Eck, LB | New Mexico |
| Defensive Player of the Year | Chris Johnson, DB | San Diego State |
| Special Teams Player of the Year | Kansei Matsuzawa, PK | Hawaiʻi |
| Freshman Player of the Year | Micah Alejado, QB | Hawaiʻi |
| Coach of the Year | Jason Eck | New Mexico |

=== All-conference teams ===
The following players were selected as part of the Mountain West's All-Conference Teams.

| Position | Player | Team |
|---|---|---|
First Team Offense
| QB | Anthony Colandrea | UNLV |
| WR | Jackson Harris | Hawaiʻi |
| WR | Danny Scudero | San Jose State |
| WR | Braden Pegan | Utah State |
| RB | Lucky Sutton | San Diego State |
| RB | Jai'Den Thomas | UNLV |
| TE | Dorian Thomas | New Mexico |
| OL | Costen Cooley | Air Force |
| OL | Kage Casey | Boise State |
| OL | Mason Randolph | Boise State |
| OL | Jacob Spomer | Fresno State |
| OL | Ross Ulugalu-Maseuli | San Diego State |
| PK | Kansei Matsuzawa | Hawaiʻi |
| KR | Damon Bankston | New Mexico |
First Team Defense
| DL | Jackie Johnson III | Hawaiʻi |
| DL | Dylan LaBarbera | Nevada |
| DL | Keyshawn James-Newby | New Mexico |
| DL | Trey White | San Diego State |
| LB | Owen Long | Colorado State |
| LB | Jaxton Eck | New Mexico |
| LB | Owen Chambliss | San Diego State |
| LB | Jordan Pollard | San Jose State |
| LB | John Miller | Utah State |
| DB | Ty Benefield | Boise State |
| DB | A'Marion McCoy | Boise State |
| DB | Chris Johnson | San Diego State |
| DB | Noah Avinger | Utah State |
| PR | Bryan Hansen | Colorado State |
| P | Jordan Napier | San Diego State |

| Position | Player | Team |
|---|---|---|
Second Team Offense
| QB | Bryson Barnes | Utah State |
| WR | Pofele Ashlock | Hawaiʻi |
| WR | Jordan Napier | San Diego State |
| WR | Jaden Bradley | UNLV |
| RB | Dylan Riley | Boise State |
| RB | Miles Davis | Utah State |
| TE | Rocky Beers | Colorado State |
| OL | Jack Burnett | Air Force |
| OL | Kaden Robnett | New Mexico |
| OL | Christian Jones | San Diego State |
| OL | Reid Williams | UNLV |
| OL | Caden Barnett | Wyoming |
| PK | Gabe Plascencia | San Diego State |
| KR | Cam Barfield | Hawaiʻi |
Second Team Defense
| DL | Payton Zdroik | Air Force |
| DL | Braxton Fely | Boise State |
| DL | Jayden Virgin-Morgan | Boise State |
| DL | De'Jon Benton | Hawaiʻi |
| LB | Blake Fletcher | Air Force |
| LB | Jadon Pearson | Fresno State |
| LB | Marsel McDuffie | UNLV |
| LB | Brayden Johnson | Wyoming |
| DB | Jeremiah Earby | Boise State |
| DB | Al'Zillion Hamilton | Fresno State |
| DB | Murvin Kenion III | Nevada |
| DB | Aamaris Brown | UNLV |
| P | Hunter Green | San Diego State |
| PR | Javion Kinnard | Colorado State |

=== All-Americans ===
| Position | Player | School | Selector | Unanimous | Consensus |
|---|---|---|---|---|---|
First Team All-Americans
| DB | Chris Johnson | San Diego State | (PFF) | | |
| PK | Kansei Matsuzawa | Hawaiʻi | (AFCA, AP, WCFF, CBS, ESPN) | | ✓ |
| P | Billy Gowers | Hawaiʻi | (PFF) | | |

| Position | Player | School | Selector |
|---|---|---|---|
Second Team All-Americans
| WR | Danny Scudero | San Jose State | (AFCA, AP, WCFF, CBS, ESPN) |
| DB | Chris Johnson | San Diego State | (AP, TSN) |
| PK | Kansei Matsuzawa | Hawaiʻi | (FWAA, TSN, Athletic, SI, USAT) |

== NFL draft ==
The 2026 NFL draft will be held in Pittsburgh, Pennsylvania. The following list includes all Mountain West players in the draft.

=== List of selections ===
| Player | Position | School | Draft Round | Round Pick | Overall Pick | Team |
|---|---|---|---|---|---|---|
| Chris Johnson | CB | San Diego State | 1 | 27 | 27 | Miami Dolphins |
| Kage Casey | OT | Boise State | 4 | 11 | 111 | Denver Broncos |
| Keyshawn James-Newby | DE | New Mexico | 7 | 36 | 252 | Philadelphia Eagles |
