= Keyshawn =

Keyshawn is a given name. Notable people with the name include:

- Keyshawn Davis (born 1999), American boxer
- Keyshawn Hall (born 2003), American basketball player
- Keyshawn James-Newby (born 2002), American football player
- Keyshawn Johnson (born 1972), American football player
- Keyshawn Strachan (born 2003), Bahamian track and field athlete
- Keyshawn Woods (born 1996), American basketball player
- Lazer Dim 700, born as Devokeyous Keyshawn Hamilton

== See also ==
- Keshawn, given name
