= 2025 New Mexico Lobos football team =

American college football season

2025 New Mexico Lobos football

Rate Bowl, L 17–20^{OT} vs. Minnesota
- Conference: Mountain West Conference
- Record: 9–4 (6–2 MW)
- Head coach: Jason Eck (1st season)
- Offensive coordinator: Luke Schleusner (1st season)
- Offensive scheme: Pro spread
- Defensive coordinator: Spence Nowinsky (1st season)
- Base defense: 4–2–5
- Home stadium: University Stadium

2025 Mountain West Conference football standings
| | Conf. | | | Overall |
| Team | W | | L | W | | L |
|---|---|---|---|---|---|---|
| Boise State y$ | 6 | – | 2 | 9 | – | 5 |
| UNLV y | 6 | – | 2 | 10 | – | 4 |
| San Diego State | 6 | – | 2 | 9 | – | 4 |
| New Mexico | 6 | – | 2 | 9 | – | 4 |
| Fresno State | 5 | – | 3 | 9 | – | 4 |
| Hawaii | 5 | – | 3 | 9 | – | 4 |
| Utah State | 4 | – | 4 | 6 | – | 7 |
| Air Force | 3 | – | 5 | 4 | – | 8 |
| Nevada | 2 | – | 6 | 3 | – | 9 |
| Wyoming | 2 | – | 6 | 4 | – | 8 |
| San Jose State | 2 | – | 6 | 3 | – | 9 |
| Colorado State | 1 | – | 7 | 2 | – | 10 |
Championship: Boise State 38, UNLV 21
$ – Conference champion; y – Championship game participant; Rankings from CFP Rankings

The 2025 New Mexico Lobos football team represented the University of New Mexico as a member of the Mountain West Conference (MW) during the 2025 NCAA Division I FBS football season. Led by first-year head coach Jason Eck, the Lobos played home games at University Stadium in Albuquerque, New Mexico.

With a 40–35 victory over UNLV on November 1, the Lobos became bowl eligible for the first time since the 2016 season.

Hired in December 2024, Eck was previously the head coach at the University of Idaho, and led the Vandals to the FCS playoffs in all three seasons.

== Schedule ==
| Date | Time | Opponent | Site | TV | Result | Attendance |
|---|---|---|---|---|---|---|
| August 30 | 5:30 p.m. | at No. 14 Michigan* | Michigan Stadium; Ann Arbor, MI | NBC | L 17–34 | 110,648 |
| September 6 | 1:00 p.m. | Idaho State* | University Stadium; Albuquerque, NM | Altitude | W 32–22 | 17,639 |
| September 12 | 8:00 p.m. | at UCLA* | Rose Bowl; Pasadena, CA | BTN | W 35–10 | 31,163 |
| September 27 | 2:00 p.m. | New Mexico State* | University Stadium; Albuquerque, NM (Rio Grande Rivalry) | Altitude | W 38–20 | 37,440 |
| October 3 | 8:00 p.m. | at San Jose State | CEFCU Stadium; San Jose, CA | FS1 | L 28–35 | 12,109 |
| October 11 | 7:45 p.m. | at Boise State | Albertsons Stadium; Boise, ID | FS1 | L 25–41 | 32,982 |
| October 18 | 7:45 p.m. | Nevada | University Stadium; Albuquerque, NM | FS1 | W 24–22 | 18,233 |
| October 25 | 1:00 p.m. | Utah State | University Stadium; Albuquerque, NM | Altitude | W 33–14 | 20,097 |
| November 1 | 1:00 p.m. | at UNLV | Allegiant Stadium; Paradise, NV | MW Network | W 40–35 | 25,972 |
| November 15 | 1:00 p.m. | Colorado State | University Stadium; Albuquerque, NM | Altitude | W 20–17 | 27,526 |
| November 22 | 5:00 p.m. | at Air Force | Falcon Stadium; Air Force Academy, CO | CBSSN | W 20–3 | 20,218 |
| November 28 | 1:30 p.m. | San Diego State | University Stadium; Albuquerque, NM | CBSSN | W 23–17 ^{2OT} | 30,575 |
| December 26 | 2:30 p.m. | vs. Minnesota* | Chase Field; Phoenix, AZ (Rate Bowl) | ESPN | L 17–20 ^{OT} | 27,439 |
*Non-conference game; Rankings from AP (and CFP Rankings, after November 5) -; All times are in Mountain time

== Preseason ==
=== Mountain West media poll ===
The Mountain West's preseason prediction poll was released on July 16, 2025. New Mexico was predicted to finish 11th in the conference.

== Game summaries ==
=== at No. 14 Michigan ===
New Mexico Lobos (0–0) at No. 14 Michigan Wolverines (0–0) – Game summary

| Quarter | 1 | 2 | 3 | 4 | Total |
|---|---|---|---|---|---|
| Lobos | 0 | 10 | 7 | 0 | 17 |
| No. 14 Wolverines | 7 | 14 | 14 | 7 | 42 |

at Michigan Stadium • Ann Arbor, MI

- Date: August 30
- Game time: 5:30 p.m. MDT
- Game weather: 70 °F (21 °C), clear, NE 2 miles per hour (3.2 km/h)
- Game attendance: 110,648
- Referee: Chris Coyte
- TV announcers (NBC): Noah Eagle (play-by-play), Todd Blackledge (analyst), and Kathryn Tappen (sideline)

Game information

First quarter

- (12:57) MICH – Justice Haynes 56-yard run, Dominic Zvada kick (Drive: 6 plays, 78 yards, 1:57; Michigan 7–0)
- (4:26) MICH – Justice Haynes 5-yard run, Dominic Zvada kick (Drive: 13 plays, 73 yards, 6:46; Michigan 14–0)

Second quarter

- (8:21) MICH – Dominic Zvada 21-yard field goal (Drive: 5 plays, 14 yards, 1:54; Michigan 17–0)
- (2:23) UNM – Dorian Thomas 9-yard pass from DJ McKinney, Luke Drzewiecki kick (Drive: 12 plays, 82 yards, 5:55; Michigan 17–7)
- (1:56) UNM – Luke Drzewiecki 44-yard field goal (Drive: 4 plays, 2 yards, 0:22; Michigan 17–10)
- (0:25) MICH – Marlin Klein 15-yard pass from Bryce Underwood, Dominic Zvada kick (Drive: 8 plays, 75 yards, 1:31; Michigan 24–10)

Third quarter

- (10:19) MICH – Dominic Zvada 39-yard field goal (Drive: 9 plays, 73 yards, 2:47; Michigan 27–10)
- (1:40) UNM – Dorian Thomas 3-yard pass from Jack Layne, Luke Drzewiecki kick (Drive: 15 plays, 75 yards, 8:39; Michigan 27–17)

Fourth quarter

- (10:14) MICH – Justice Haynes 1-yard run, Dominic Zvada kick (Drive: 6 plays, 80 yards, 3:16; Michigan 34–17)

| Statistics | UNM | MICH |
|---|---|---|
| First downs | 21 | 20 |
| Plays–yards | 76–267 | 63–452 |
| Rushes–yards | 28–50 | 32–201 |
| Passing yards | 217 | 251 |
| Passing: comp–att–int | 32–48–3 | 21–31–0 |
| Turnovers | 3 | 1 |
| Time of possession | 33:02 | 26:58 |

| Team | Category | Player | Statistics |
|---|---|---|---|
| New Mexico | Passing | Jack Layne | 31/47, 208 yards, TD, 3 INT |
| New Mexico | Rushing | Scottre Humphrey | 10 carries, 33 yards |
| New Mexico | Receiving | Dorian Thomas | 10 receptions, 71 yards, 2 TD |
| Michigan | Passing | Bryce Underwood | 21/31, 251 yards, TD |
| Michigan | Rushing | Justice Haynes | 16 carries, 159 yards, 3 TD |
| Michigan | Receiving | Marlin Klein | 6 receptions, 93 yards, TD |

=== Idaho State (FCS) ===
Idaho State Bengals (FCS) (0–2) at New Mexico Lobos (0–1) – Game summary

| Quarter | 1 | 2 | 3 | 4 | Total |
|---|---|---|---|---|---|
| Bengals (FCS) | 0 | 10 | 6 | 6 | 22 |
| Lobos | 7 | 7 | 3 | 15 | 32 |

at University Stadium • Albuquerque, NM

- Date: September 6
- Game time: 1:00 p.m. MDT
- Game attendance: 17,639
- Referee: Gary Reed
- TV announcers (Altitude): Robert Portnoy (play-by-play) and DonTrell Moore (analyst)

Game information

First quarter

- UNM – Jack Layne 7-yard run (Luke Drzewiecki kick), 0:21. Lobos 7–0. Drive: 10 plays, 98 yards, 5:04.

Second quarter

- IDST – Trajan Sinatra 27-yard field goal, 8:56. Lobos 7–3. Drive: 13 plays, 70 yards, 6:21.
- UNM – Scottre Humphrey 61-yard run (Luke Drzewiecki kick), 7:34. Lobos 14–3. Drive: 3 plays, 69 yards, 1:22.
- IDST – Michael Shulikov 30-yard pass from Davis Harsin (Trajan Sinatra kick), 1:03. Lobos 14–10. Drive: 6 plays, 67 yards, 1:29.

Third quarter

- IDST – Trajan Sinatra 56-yard field goal, 10:30. Lobos 14–13. Drive: 6 plays, 16 yards, 2:17.
- IDST – Trajan Sinatra 33-yard field goal, 5:25. Bengals 16–14. Drive: 7 plays, 27 yards, 3:23.
- UNM – Luke Drzewiecki 21-yard field goal, 0:13. Lobos 17–16. Drive: 9 plays, 45 yards, 5:04.

Fourth quarter

- IDST – Tytan Mason 3-yard run (pass failed), 10:40. Bengals 22–17. Drive: 11 plays, 75 yards, 4:33.
- UNM – Damon Bankston 1-yard run (Jack Layne–Dorian Thomas pass), 7:17. Lobos 25–22. Drive: 9 plays, 70 yards, 3:16.
- UNM – Scottre Humphrey 1-yard run (Luke Drzewiecki kick), 1:48. Lobos 32–22. Drive: 9 plays, 58 yards, 3:40.

| Statistics | IDST | UNM |
|---|---|---|
| First downs | 21 | 20 |
| Total yards | 386 | 371 |
| Rushes–yards | 31–121 | 40–216 |
| Passing yards | 265 | 155 |
| Passing: Comp–Att–Int | 28–39–1 | 13–21–0 |
| Turnovers | 1 | 1 |
| Time of possession | 30:31 | 29:29 |

| Team | Category | Player | Statistics |
|---|---|---|---|
| Idaho State | Passing | Davis Harsin | 17/26, 181 yards, TD, INT |
| Idaho State | Rushing | Davis Harsin | 11 carries, 60 yards |
| Idaho State | Receiving | Michael Shulikov | 4 receptions, 74 yards, TD |
| New Mexico | Passing | Jack Layne | 13/21, 155 yards |
| New Mexico | Rushing | Scottre Humphrey | 18 carries, 141 yards, 2 TD |
| New Mexico | Receiving | Dorian Thomas | 5 receptions, 56 yards |

=== at UCLA ===
New Mexico Lobos (1–1) at UCLA Bruins (0–2) – Game summary

| Quarter | 1 | 2 | 3 | 4 | Total |
|---|---|---|---|---|---|
| Lobos | 7 | 7 | 0 | 21 | 35 |
| Bruins | 0 | 7 | 3 | 0 | 10 |

at Rose Bowl • Pasadena, CA

- Date: September 12, 2025
- Game time: 8:00 p.m. MDT
- Game weather: Clear • Temperature: 71 °F (22 °C) • Wind: SW at 7 miles per hour (11 km/h)
- Game attendance: 31,163
- Referee: Ron Snodrass
- TV announcers (BTN): Carlo Jimenez (play-by-play), Brock Vereen (analyst), and Drea Avent (sideline)

Game information

First quarter

- (3:10) UNM – Scottre Humphrey 1-yard run, Luke Drzewiecki kick (Drive: 9 plays, 64 yards, 5:25; New Mexico 7–0)

Second quarter

- (12:43) UNM – Simon Mapa 8-yard pass from Jack Layne, Luke Drzewiecki kick (Drive: 7 plays, 59 yards, 3:56; New Mexico 14–0)
- (8:59) UCLA – Titus Mokiao-Atimalala 12-yard pass from Nico Iamaleava, Mateen Bhaghani kick (Drive: 8 plays, 78 yards, 3:39; New Mexico 14–7)

Third quarter

- (3:34) UCLA – Mateen Bhaghani 51-yard field goal (Drive: 5 plays, 26 yards, 3:00; New Mexico 14–10)

Fourth quarter

- (10:42) UNM – Damon Bankston 2-yard run, Luke Drzewiecki kick (Drive: 13 plays, 75 yards, 7:52; New Mexico 21–10)
- (7:06) UNM – Damon Bankston 43-yard pass from Jack Layne, Luke Drzewiecki kick (Drive: 3 plays, 42 yards, 2:07; New Mexico 28–10)
- (0:36) UNM – D. J. McKinney 3-yard run, Luke Drzewiecki kick (Drive: 7 plays, 74 yards, 3:22; New Mexico 35–10)

| Statistics | UNM | UCLA |
|---|---|---|
| First downs | 22 | 15 |
| Plays–yards | 63–450 | 56–326 |
| Rushes–yards | 46–298 | 22–109 |
| Passing yards | 152 | 217 |
| Passing: comp–att–int | 12–17–0 | 22–34–1 |
| Turnovers | 2 | 1 |
| Time of possession | 36:38 | 23:22 |

| Team | Category | Player | Statistics |
|---|---|---|---|
| New Mexico | Passing | Jack Layne | 12/16, 152 yards, 2 TD |
| New Mexico | Rushing | Damon Bankston | 15 carries, 154 yards, TD |
| New Mexico | Receiving | Damon Bankston | 3 receptions, 49 yards, TD |
| UCLA | Passing | Nico Iamaleava | 22/34, 217 yards, TD, INT |
| UCLA | Rushing | Anthony Woods | 10 carries, 64 yards |
| UCLA | Receiving | Mikey Matthews | 3 receptions, 67 yards |

=== New Mexico State (Rio Grande Rivalry) ===
New Mexico State Aggies (2–1) at New Mexico Lobos (2–1) – Game summary

| Quarter | 1 | 2 | 3 | 4 | Total |
|---|---|---|---|---|---|
| Aggies | 7 | 10 | 0 | 3 | 20 |
| Lobos | 7 | 7 | 10 | 14 | 38 |

at University Stadium • Albuquerque, NM

- Date: September 27
- Game time: 2:00 p.m. MDT
- Game weather: Cloudy • Temperature: 71 °F (22 °C) • Wind: SE at 16 miles per hour (26 km/h)
- Game attendance: 37,440
- Referee: Nolan Dumas
- TV announcers (Altitude): Robert Portnoy (play-by-play) and DonTrell Moore (analyst)

Game information

First quarter

- (9:21) NMSU – TJ Pride 34-yard pass from Donovan Faupel, Ryan Hawk kick (Drive: 3 plays, 49 yards, 1:11; New Mexico State 7–0)
- (3:56) UNM – Cade Keith 5-yard pass from Jack Layne, Luke Drzewiecki kick (Drive: 10 plays, 71 yards, 5:17; Tied 7–7)

Second quarter

- (14:14) NMSU – Ryan Hawk 47-yard field goal (Drive: 10 plays, 45 yards, 4:42; New Mexico State 10–7)
- (12:18) NMSU – Bernock Iya 42-yard fumble recovery, Ryan Hawk kick (New Mexico State 17–7)
- (9:27) UNM – Shawn Miller 31-yard pass from Jack Layne, Luke Drzewiecki kick (Drive: 8 plays, 75 yards, 2:51; New Mexico State 17–14)

Third quarter

- (9:55) UNM – Luke Drzewiecki 44-yard field goal (Drive: 10 plays, 49 yards, 5:05; Tied 17–17)
- (1:12) UNM – Dorian Thomas 24-yard pass from Jack Layne, Luke Drzewiecki kick (Drive: 4 plays, 84 yards, 2:01; New Mexico 24–17)

Fourth quarter

- (12:34) NMSU – Ryan Hawk 39-yard field goal (Drive: 8 plays, 53 yards, 3:38; New Mexico 24–20)
- (11:37) UNM – Keagan Johnson 41-yard pass from Michael Buckley, Luke Drzewiecki kick (Drive: 2 plays, 75 yards, 0:57; New Mexico 31–20)
- (5:09) UNM – Scottre Humphrey 8-yard pass from Jack Layne, Luke Drzewiecki kick (Drive: 8 plays, 38 yards, 4:58; New Mexico 38–20)

| Statistics | NMSU | UNM |
|---|---|---|
| First downs | 16 | 24 |
| Plays–yards | 68–304 | 69–476 |
| Rushes–yards | 30–15 | 38–132 |
| Passing yards | 289 | 344 |
| Passing: Comp–Att–Int | 21–38–1 | 24–31–0 |
| Turnovers | 1 | 2 |
| Time of possession | 27:55 | 32:05 |

| Team | Category | Player | Statistics |
|---|---|---|---|
| New Mexico State | Passing | Logan Fife | 20/37, 255 yards, INT |
| New Mexico State | Rushing | Kadarius Calloway | 8 carries, 34 yards |
| New Mexico State | Receiving | Gavin Harris | 6 receptions, 97 yards |
| New Mexico | Passing | Jack Layne | 23/30, 303 yards, 4 TD |
| New Mexico | Rushing | Scottre Humphrey | 13 carries, 41 yards |
| New Mexico | Receiving | Keagan Johnson | 5 receptions, 117 yards, TD |

=== at San Jose State ===
New Mexico Lobos (3–1) at San Jose State Spartans (1–3) – Game summary

| Quarter | 1 | 2 | 3 | 4 | Total |
|---|---|---|---|---|---|
| Lobos | 0 | 17 | 0 | 11 | 28 |
| Spartans | 7 | 14 | 14 | 0 | 35 |

at CEFCU Stadium • San Jose, CA

- Date: October 3, 2025
- Game time: 8:00 p.m. MDT
- Game weather: Sunny • Temperature: 64 °F (18 °C)
- Game attendance: 12,109
- Referee: Patrick Foy
- TV announcers (FS1): Trent Rush (play-by-play) and Mark Helfrich (analyst)

Game information

First quarter

- SJSU – Steve Chavez-Soto 4-yard run (Mathias Brown kick), 9:10. Spartans 7–0. Drive: 12 plays, 75 yards, 5:50.

Second quarter

- SJSU – Matthew Coleman 11-yard pass from Walker Eget (Mathias Brown kick), 14:22. Spartans 14–0. Drive: 9 plays, 67 yards, 4:54.
- UNM – Damon Bankston 4-yard run (Luke Drzewiecki kick), 9:30. Spartans 14–7. Drive: 10 plays, 75 yards, 4:52.
- SJSU – Danny Scudero 70-yard pass from Walker Eget (Mathias Brown kick), 6:15. Spartans 21–7. Drive: 6 plays, 92 yards, 3:03.
- UNM – Scottre Humphrey 1-yard run (Luke Drzewiecki kick), 3:29. Spartans 21–14. Drive: 6 plays, 78 yards, 2:41.
- UNM – Luke Drzewiecki 25-yard field goal, 0:00. Spartans 21–17. Drive: 11 plays, 72 yards, 1:52.

Third quarter

- SJSU – Steve Chavez-Soto 10-yard run (Mathias Brown kick), 10:27. Spartans 28–17. Drive: 5 plays, 70 yards, 2:43.
- SJSU – Leland Smith 8-yard pass from Walker Eget (Mathias Brown kick), 2:42. Spartans 35–17. Drive: 11 plays, 86 yards, 6:13.

Fourth quarter

- UNM – Jack Layne 3-yard run (Jack Layne–Shawn Miller pass), 11:02. Spartans 35–25. Drive: 9 plays, 72 yards, 3:00.
- UNM – Luke Drzewiecki 31-yard field goal, 3:41. Spartans 35–28. Drive: 12 plays, 80 yards, 2:57.

| Statistics | UNM | SJSU |
|---|---|---|
| First downs | 29 | 24 |
| Plays–yards | 67–420 | 64–491 |
| Rushes–yards | 27–76 | 34–157 |
| Passing yards | 344 | 334 |
| Passing: Comp–Att–Int | 28–40–3 | 26–30–0 |
| Turnovers | 3 | 0 |
| Time of possession | 26:33 | 33:27 |

| Team | Category | Player | Statistics |
|---|---|---|---|
| New Mexico | Passing | Jack Layne | 28/40, 344 yards, 3 INT |
| New Mexico | Rushing | Damon Bankston | 9 carries, 51 yards, TD |
| New Mexico | Receiving | Keagan Johnson | 11 receptions, 145 yards |
| San Jose State | Passing | Walker Eget | 26/30, 334 yards, 3 TD |
| San Jose State | Rushing | Steve Chavez-Soto | 14 carries, 71 yards, 2 TD |
| San Jose State | Receiving | Danny Scudero | 7 receptions, 151 yards, TD |

=== at Boise State ===
New Mexico Lobos (3–2) at Boise State Broncos (3–2) – Game summary

| Quarter | 1 | 2 | 3 | 4 | Total |
|---|---|---|---|---|---|
| Lobos | 0 | 14 | 3 | 8 | 25 |
| Broncos | 10 | 7 | 3 | 21 | 41 |

at Albertsons Stadium • Boise, ID

- Date: October 11
- Game time: 7:45 p.m. MDT
- Game weather: Cloudy • Temperature: 55 °F (13 °C) • Wind: NW at 6 miles per hour (9.7 km/h)
- Game attendance: 32,982
- Referee: Brad Carrell
- TV announcers (FS1): Noah Reed (play-by-play) and Robert Smith (analyst)

Game information

First quarter

- (11:19) BOIS - Colton Boomer 24-yard field goal (Drive: 8 plays, 12 yards, 3:29; Boise State 3-0)
- (0:00) BOIS – Sire Gaines 2-yard run, Colton Boomer kick (Drive: 13 plays, 74 yards, 6:37; Boise State 10-0)

Second quarter

- (14:47) UNM - Damon Bankston 100-yard kickoff return (Boise State 10-7)
- (10:30) UNM - Dorian Thomas 1-yard pass from Jack Layne, Luke Drzewiecki kick (Drive: 8 plays, 58 yards, 2:50; New Mexico 14-10)
- (3:20) BOIS - Ben Ford 6-yard pass from Maddux Madsen, Colton Boomer kick (Drive: 14 plays, 75 yards, 7:10; Boise State 17-14)

Third quarter

- (9:22) BOIS - Colton Boomer 50-yard field goal (Drive: 11 plays, 43 yards, 5:38; Boise State 20-14)
- (4:21) UNM - Luke Drzewiecki 29-yard field goal (Drive: 10 plays, 64 yards, 5:01; Boise State 20-17)

Fourth quarter

- (14:22) BOIS - Sire Gaines 4-yard run, Colton Boomer kick (Drive: 9 plays, 75 yards, 4:59; Boise State 27-17)
- (7:31) BOIS - Troy Grizzle 10-yard pass from Oscar Doyle, Colton Boomer kick (Drive: 9 plays, 46 yards, 4:18; Boise State 34-17)
- (5:14) BOIS - Ben Ford 25-yard pass from Maddux Madsen, Colton Boomer kick (Drive: 4 plays, 33 yards, 1:36; Boise State 41-17)
- (1:16) UNM - Keagan Johnson 4-yard pass from James Laubstein, James Laubstein run for two-point conversion (Drive: 15 plays, 75 yards, 3:58; Boise State 41-25)

| Statistics | UNM | BOIS |
|---|---|---|
| First downs | 11 | 27 |
| Plays–yards | 54–231 | 86–397 |
| Rushes–yards | 24–49 | 54–161 |
| Passing yards | 182 | 236 |
| Passing: Comp–Att–Int | 15–30–2 | 22–32–0 |
| Turnovers | 3 | 0 |
| Time of possession | 19:25 | 40:35 |

| Team | Category | Player | Statistics |
|---|---|---|---|
| New Mexico | Passing | Jack Layne | 7/17, 115 yards, TD, 2 INT |
| New Mexico | Rushing | Damon Bankston | 9 carries, 18 yards |
| New Mexico | Receiving | Dorian Thomas | 4 receptions, 61 yards, TD |
| Boise State | Passing | Maddux Madsen | 21/31, 226 yards, 2 TD |
| Boise State | Rushing | Dylan Riley | 18 carries, 101 yards |
| Boise State | Receiving | Ben Ford | 6 receptions, 78 yards, 2 TD |

=== Nevada ===
Nevada Wolf Pack (1–5) at New Mexico Lobos (3–3) – Game summary

| Quarter | 1 | 2 | 3 | 4 | Total |
|---|---|---|---|---|---|
| Wolf Pack | 3 | 9 | 7 | 3 | 22 |
| Lobos | 7 | 7 | 10 | 0 | 24 |

at University Stadium • Albuquerque, NM

- Date: October 18
- Game time: 7:45 p.m. MDT
- Game attendance: 18,233
- Referee: Christian Watson
- TV announcers (FS1): Dan Hellie (play-by-play) and Petros Papadakis (analyst)

Game information

First quarter

- UNM – D.J. McKinney 2-yard run (Luke Drzewiecki kick), 7:16. Lobos 7–0. Drive: 16 plays, 75 yards, 7:44.
- NEV – Joe McFadden 33-yard field goal, 3:41. Lobos 7–3. Drive: 4 plays, 1 yard, 1:56.

Second quarter

- UNM – Scottre Humphrey 1-yard run (Luke Drzewiecki kick), 6:51. Lobos 14–3. Drive: 11 plays, 91 yards, 6:23.
- NEV – Joe McFadden 36-yard field goal, 1:51. Lobos 14–6. Drive: 10 plays, 56 yards, 5:00.
- NEV – Caleb Ramseur 3-yard run (pass failed), 0:41. Lobos 14–12. Drive: 3 plays, 22 yards, 0:33.

Third quarter

- UNM – D.J. McKinney 22-yard run (Luke Drzewiecki kick), 11:45. Lobos 21–12. Drive: 4 plays, 32 yards, 1:12.
- NEV – Caleb Ramseur 4-yard run (Joe McFadden kick), 3:25. Lobos 21–19. Drive: 15 plays, 75 yards, 8:20.
- UNM – Luke Drzewiecki 29-yard field goal, 0:00. Lobos 24–19. Drive: 7 plays, 63 yards, 3:25.

Fourth quarter

- NEV – Joe McFadden 41-yard field goal, 10:55. Lobos 24–22. Drive: 9 plays, 51 yards, 4:05.

| Statistics | NEV | UNM |
|---|---|---|
| First downs | 16 | 22 |
| Plays–yards | 57–257 | 64–348 |
| Rushes–yards | 28–55 | 42–210 |
| Passing yards | 202 | 138 |
| Passing: Comp–Att–Int | 23–29–0 | 14–22–0 |
| Turnovers | 0 | 2 |
| Time of possession | 29:27 | 30:33 |

| Team | Category | Player | Statistics |
|---|---|---|---|
| Nevada | Passing | Carter Jones | 23/29, 202 yards |
| Nevada | Rushing | Caleb Ramseur | 14 carries, 39 yards, 2 TD |
| Nevada | Receiving | Marshaun Brown | 7 receptions, 75 yards |
| New Mexico | Passing | Jack Layne | 14/22, 138 yards |
| New Mexico | Rushing | Jack Layne | 8 carries, 71 yards |
| New Mexico | Receiving | Dorian Thomas | 5 receptions, 56 yards |

=== Utah State ===
Utah State Aggies (4–3) at New Mexico Lobos (4–3) – Game summary

| Quarter | 1 | 2 | 3 | 4 | Total |
|---|---|---|---|---|---|
| Aggies | 0 | 7 | 0 | 7 | 14 |
| Lobos | 7 | 19 | 0 | 7 | 33 |

at University Stadium • Albuquerque, NM

- Date: October 25
- Game time: 1:00 p.m. MDT
- Game attendance: 20,097
- Referee: Kenneth Ray
- TV announcers (Altitude): Robert Portnoy (play-by-play) and DonTrell Moore (analyst)

Game information

First quarter

- UNM – D.J. McKinney 49-yard punt return (Luke Drzewiecki kick), 9:14. Lobos 7–0.

Second quarter

- UNM – D.J. McKinney 1-yard run (Luke Drzewiecki kick), 13:29. Lobos 14–0. Drive: 13 plays, 80 yards, 6:54.
- UNM – Jaxton Eck safety, 9:02. Lobos 16–0.
- UNM – Luke Drzewiecki 41-yard field goal, 5:59. Lobos 19–0. Drive: 7 plays, 34 yards, 2:55.
- USU – Miles Davis 64-yard run (Tanner Rinker kick), 4:51. Lobos 19–7. Drive: 3 plays, 75 yards, 1:08.
- UNM – Cade Keith 40-yard pass from Jack Layne (Luke Drzewiecki kick), 2:44. Lobos 26–7. Drive: 4 plays, 70 yards, 2:08.

Third quarter

- No scoring plays.

Fourth quarter

- USU – Braden Pegan 13-yard pass from Bryson Barnes (Tanner Rinker kick), 12:49. Lobos 26–14. Drive: 7 plays, 87 yards, 2:19.
- UNM – Damon Bankston 41-yard run (Luke Drzewiecki kick), 8:28. Lobos 33–14. Drive: 7 plays, 75 yards, 4:21.

| Statistics | USU | UNM |
|---|---|---|
| First downs | 15 | 21 |
| Plays–yards | 48–306 | 64–407 |
| Rushes–yards | 25–142 | 42–224 |
| Passing yards | 164 | 183 |
| Passing: Comp–Att–Int | 13–23–1 | 17–22–0 |
| Turnovers | 1 | 0 |
| Time of possession | 21:44 | 38:16 |

| Team | Category | Player | Statistics |
|---|---|---|---|
| Utah State | Passing | Bryson Barnes | 13/23, 164 yards, TD, INT |
| Utah State | Rushing | Miles Davis | 10 carries, 110 yards, TD |
| Utah State | Receiving | Braden Pegan | 5 receptions, 108 yards, TD |
| New Mexico | Passing | Jack Layne | 17/22, 183 yards, TD |
| New Mexico | Rushing | Damon Bankston | 13 carries, 84 yards, TD |
| New Mexico | Receiving | Cade Keith | 7 receptions, 104 yards, TD |

=== at UNLV ===
New Mexico Lobos (5–3) at UNLV Rebels (6–1) – Game summary

| Quarter | 1 | 2 | 3 | 4 | Total |
|---|---|---|---|---|---|
| Lobos | 7 | 24 | 3 | 6 | 40 |
| Rebels | 0 | 21 | 7 | 7 | 35 |

at Allegiant Stadium • Paradise, NV

- Date: November 1
- Game time: 1:00 p.m. MDT
- Game weather: none (played indoors)
- Game attendance: 25,972
- Referee: Gary Reed
- TV announcers (MW Network/KVVU): Matt Neverett (play-by-play) and Caleb Herring (analyst)

Game information

First quarter

- UNM – Damon Bankston 30-yard pass from Jack Layne (Luke Drzewiecki kick), 4:09. Lobos 7–0. Drive: 10 plays, 78 yards, 5:08.

Second quarter

- UNM – Simon Mapa 12-yard pass from James Laubstein (Luke Drzewiecki kick), 14:52. Lobos 14–0. Drive: 3 plays, 71 yards, 1:03.
- UNM – Damon Bankston 84-yard pass from Jack Layne (Luke Drzewiecki kick), 12:43. Lobos 21–0. Drive: 1 play, 84 yards, 0:13.
- UNLV – Daejon Reynolds 7-yard pass from Anthony Colandrea (Ramon Villela kick), 8:55. Lobos 21–7. Drive: 9 plays, 82 yards, 3:42.
- UNLV – Keyvone Lee 5-yard run (Ramon Villela kick), 3:14. Lobos 21–14. Drive: 7 plays, 69 yards, 3:29.
- UNLV – Quandarius Keyes 25-yard interception return (Ramon Villela kick), 2:20. Tied 21–21.
- UNM – Keagan Johnson 80-yard pass from Jack Layne (Luke Drzewiecki kick), 1:49. Lobos 28–21. Drive: 2 plays, 84 yards, 0:27.
- UNM – Luke Drzewiecki 46-yard field goal, 0:00. Lobos 31–21. Drive: 5 plays, 25 yards, 0:41.

Third quarter

- UNM – Luke Drzewiecki 40-yard field goal, 10:46. Lobos 34–21. Drive: 7 plays, 50 yards, 2:52.
- UNLV – Var'Keyes Gumms 27-yard pass from Anthony Colandrea (Ramon Villela kick), 8:10. Lobos 34–28. Drive: 6 plays, 75 yards, 2:36.

Fourth quarter

- UNLV – Nick Elksnis 14-yard pass from Anthony Colandrea (Ramon Villela kick), 6:35. Rebels 35–34. Drive: 7 plays, 34 yards, 3:32.
- UNM – D.J. McKinney 13-yard run (pass failed), 2:54. Lobos 40–35. Drive: 8 plays, 75 yards, 3:41.

| Statistics | UNM | UNLV |
|---|---|---|
| First downs | 16 | 25 |
| Plays–yards | 55–532 | 76–470 |
| Rushes–yards | 29–131 | 29–88 |
| Passing yards | 401 | 382 |
| Passing: Comp–Att–Int | 20–26–1 | 36–47–0 |
| Turnovers | 1 | 3 |
| Time of possession | 27:30 | 32:30 |

| Team | Category | Player | Statistics |
|---|---|---|---|
| New Mexico | Passing | Jack Layne | 17/22, 342 yards, 3 TD, INT |
| New Mexico | Rushing | James Laubstein | 8 carries, 99 yards |
| New Mexico | Receiving | Keagan Johnson | 6 receptions, 158 yards, TD |
| UNLV | Passing | Anthony Colandrea | 36/46, 382 yards, 3 TD |
| UNLV | Rushing | Anthony Colandrea | 8 carries, 40 yards |
| UNLV | Receiving | Daejon Reynolds | 5 receptions, 78 yards, TD |

=== Colorado State ===
Colorado State Rams (2–7) at New Mexico Lobos (6–3) – Game summary

| Quarter | 1 | 2 | 3 | 4 | Total |
|---|---|---|---|---|---|
| Rams | 0 | 0 | 10 | 7 | 17 |
| Lobos | 0 | 10 | 0 | 10 | 20 |

at University Stadium • Albuquerque, NM

- Date: November 15
- Game time: 1:00 p.m. MST
- Game attendance: 27,526
- Referee: Nolan Dumas
- TV announcers (Altitude/MWN): Robert Portnoy (play-by-play) and DonTrell Moore (analyst)

Game information

First quarter

- No scoring plays.

Second quarter

- UNM – D.J. McKinney 1-yard run (Luke Drzewiecki kick), 6:17. Lobos 7–0. Drive: 12 plays, 77 yards, 6:11.
- UNM – Luke Drzewiecki 45-yard field goal, 0:01. Lobos 10–0. Drive: 8 plays, 52 yards, 1:46.

Third quarter

- CSU – Rocky Beers 3-yard pass from Darius Curry (Isaiah Hankins kick), 7:32. Lobos 10–7. Drive: 4 plays, 7 yards, 1:33.
- CSU – Isaiah Hankins 30-yard field goal, 0:18. Tied 10–10. Drive: 14 plays, 68 yards, 6:25.

Fourth quarter

- UNM – Jack Layne 12-yard run (Luke Drzewiecki kick), 10:32. Lobos 17–10. Drive: 4 plays, 21 yards, 2:12.
- UNM – Luke Drzewiecki 35-yard field goal, 8:27. Lobos 20–10. Drive: 4 plays, 1 yard, 0:46.
- CSU – Lloyd Avant 41-yard pass from Darius Curry (Isaiah Hankins kick), 5:09. Lobos 20–17. Drive: 8 plays, 75 yards, 3:18.

| Statistics | CSU | UNM |
|---|---|---|
| First downs | 19 | 15 |
| Plays–yards | 71–299 | 64–348 |
| Rushes–yards | 25–13 | 39–122 |
| Passing yards | 286 | 226 |
| Passing: Comp–Att–Int | 34–46–3 | 13–25–0 |
| Turnovers | 4 | 4 |
| Time of possession | 32:30 | 27:30 |

| Team | Category | Player | Statistics |
|---|---|---|---|
| Colorado State | Passing | Darius Curry | 26/34, 248 yards, 2 TD, 3 INT |
| Colorado State | Rushing | Lloyd Avant | 12 carries, 36 yards |
| Colorado State | Receiving | Rocky Beers | 7 receptions, 67 yards, TD |
| New Mexico | Passing | Jack Layne | 13/25, 226 yards |
| New Mexico | Rushing | D.J. McKinney | 17 carries, 52 yards, TD |
| New Mexico | Receiving | Keagan Johnson | 5 receptions, 65 yards |

=== at Air Force ===
New Mexico Lobos (7–3) at Air Force Falcons (3–7) – Game summary

| Quarter | 1 | 2 | 3 | 4 | Total |
|---|---|---|---|---|---|
| Lobos | 7 | 10 | 0 | 3 | 20 |
| Falcons | 0 | 0 | 0 | 3 | 3 |

at Falcon Stadium • Air Force Academy, Colorado

- Date: November 22
- Game time: 5:00 p.m. MST
- Game attendance: 20,218
- Referee: Brad Carrell
- TV announcers (CBSSN): Chris Lewis (play-by-play) and Randy Cross (analyst)

Game information

First quarter

- UNM – Jack Layne 12-yard run (Luke Drzewiecki kick), 9:27. Lobos 7–0. Drive: 9 plays, 75 yards, 5:33.

Second quarter

- UNM – Damon Bankston 2-yard run (Luke Drzewiecki kick), 12:08. Lobos 14–0. Drive: 15 plays, 82 yards, 8:43.
- UNM – Luke Drzewiecki 27-yard field goal, 9:42. Lobos 17–0. Drive: 4 plays, 4 yards, 1:32.

Third quarter

- No scoring plays.

Fourth quarter

- AFA – Reagan Tubbs 27-yard field goal, 10:12. Lobos 17–3. Drive: 19 plays, 75 yards, 3:28.
- UNM – Luke Drzewiecki 23-yard field goal, 3:59. Lobos 20–3. Drive: 11 plays, 63 yards, 6:08.

| Statistics | UNM | AFA |
|---|---|---|
| First downs | 18 | 14 |
| Plays–yards | 55–277 | 59–161 |
| Rushes–yards | 40–172 | 48–110 |
| Passing yards | 105 | 91 |
| Passing: Comp–Att–Int | 10–15–0 | 4–11–1 |
| Turnovers | 0 | 2 |
| Time of possession | 30:46 | 29:14 |

| Team | Category | Player | Statistics |
|---|---|---|---|
| New Mexico | Passing | Jack Layne | 10/15, 105 yards |
| New Mexico | Rushing | Damon Bankston | 10 carries, 61 yards, TD |
| New Mexico | Receiving | Keagan Johnson | 4 receptions, 55 yards |
| Air Force | Passing | Josh Johnson | 3/6, 46 yards, INT |
| Air Force | Rushing | Kemper Hodges | 20 carries, 50 yards |
| Air Force | Receiving | Jonah Dawson | 2 receptions, 28 yards |

=== San Diego State ===
San Diego State Aztecs (9-2) at New Mexico Lobos (8-3) – Game summary

| Quarter | 1 | 2 | 3 | 4 | OT | 2OT | Total |
|---|---|---|---|---|---|---|---|
| Aztecs | 0 | 14 | 3 | 0 | 0 | 0 | 17 |
| Lobos | 3 | 7 | 7 | 0 | 0 | 6 | 23 |

at University Stadium • Albuquerque, NM

- Date: November 28
- Game time: 1:30 p.m. MST
- Game weather: Sunny • Temperature: 58 °F (14 °C) • Wind: SW at 6 miles per hour (9.7 km/h)
- Game attendance: 30,575
- Referee: Gary Reed
- TV announcers (CBSSN): Jack Gordon (play-by-play) and Randy Cross (analyst)

Game information

First quarter

- UNM (7:25) – Luke Drzewiecki 37-yard field goal; Drive: 12 plays, 55 yards, 7:35 (Lobos 3–0)

Second quarter

- UNM (13:15) – James Laubstein 40-yard run (Luke Drzewiecki kick); Drive: 5 plays, 65 yards, 1:55 (Lobos 10–0)
- SDSU (7:26) – Lucky Sutton 1-yard run (Gabriel Plascencia kick); Drive: 6 plays, 55 yards, 3:16 (Lobos 10–7)
- SDSU (0:59) – Donovan Brown 46-yard pass from Jayden Denegal (Gabriel Plascencia kick); Drive: 8 plays, 70 yards, 4:14 (Aztecs 14–10)

Third quarter

- UNM (8:59) – D.J. McKinney 54-yard run (Luke Drzewiecki kick); Drive: 6 plays, 80 yards, 2:09 (Lobos 17–14)
- SDSU (0:51) – Gabriel Plascencia 44-yard field goal; Drive: 7 plays, 44 yards, 2:35 (Tied 17–17)

Fourth quarter

- No scoring plays.

First overtime

- No scoring plays.

Second overtime

- UNM – Cade Keith 25-yard pass from Jack Layne (Two-point pass conversion failed); Drive: 1 play, 25 yards (Lobos 23–17)

| Statistics | SDSU | UNM |
|---|---|---|
| First downs | 20 | 16 |
| Plays–yards | 66–355 | 60–308 |
| Rushes–yards | 42–193 | 35–181 |
| Passing yards | 162 | 127 |
| Passing: Comp–Att–Int | 14–24–1 | 14–25–0 |
| Turnovers | 2 | 1 |
| Time of possession | 31:28 | 28:32 |

| Team | Category | Player | Statistics |
|---|---|---|---|
| San Diego State | Passing | Jayden Denegal | 14/24, 162 yards, TD, INT |
| San Diego State | Rushing | Lucky Sutton | 22 carries, 110 yards, TD |
| San Diego State | Receiving | Donovan Brown | 5 receptions, 91 yards, TD |
| New Mexico | Passing | Jack Layne | 14/25, 127 yards, TD |
| New Mexico | Rushing | James Laubstein | 10 carries, 70 yards, TD |
| New Mexico | Receiving | Keagan Johnson | 3 receptions, 37 yards |

=== vs. Minnesota (Rate Bowl) ===
2025 Rate Bowl
New Mexico Lobos (9–3) vs Minnesota Golden Gophers (7–5) – Game summary

| Quarter | 1 | 2 | 3 | 4 | OT | Total |
|---|---|---|---|---|---|---|
| Lobos | 3 | 3 | 0 | 8 | 3 | 17 |
| Golden Gophers | 0 | 7 | 0 | 7 | 6 | 20 |

at Chase Field • Phoenix, AZ

- Date: December 26
- Game time: 2:30 p.m. MST
- Game weather: None (retractable roof closed)
- Game attendance: 27,439
- Referee: Cravonne Barrett
- TV announcers (ESPN): Mike Monaco (play-by-play), Kirk Morrison (analyst) and Dawn Davenport (sideline)

Game information

First quarter

- (1:47) UNM – Luke Drzewiecki 31-yard field goal (15 plays, 66 yards, 8:35; UNM 3–0)

Second quarter

- (6:18) UNM – Luke Drzewiecki 29-yard field goal (11 plays, 34 yards, 5:57; UNM 6–0)
- (2:00) MINN – Jalen Smith 10-yard pass from Drake Lindsey (Brady Denaburg kick) (9 plays, 75 yards, 4:21; MINN 7–6)

Third quarter

- No scoring plays.

Fourth quarter

- (13:34) MINN – Darius Taylor 5-yard run (Brady Denaburg kick) (12 plays, 80 yards, 6:37; MINN 14–6)
- (13:30) UNM – Damon Bankston 100-yard kickoff return (Jack Layne pass to Keagan Johnson for two-point conversion) (Tied 14–14)

Overtime

- (OT) UNM – Luke Drzewiecki 36-yard field goal (4 plays, 6 yards; UNM 17–14)
- (OT) MINN – Jalen Smith 12-yard pass from Drake Lindsey (4 plays, 25 yards; MINN 20–17)

| Statistics | UNM | MINN |
|---|---|---|
| First downs | 17 | 16 |
| Plays–yards | 66–204 | 60–252 |
| Rushes–yards | 38–116 | 32–105 |
| Passing yards | 88 | 147 |
| Passing: Comp–Att–Int | 15–28–1 | 18–28–0 |
| Turnovers | 1 | 1 |
| Time of possession | 30:29 | 29:31 |

| Team | Category | Player | Statistics |
|---|---|---|---|
| New Mexico | Passing | Jack Layne | 14/25, 88 yards, INT |
| New Mexico | Rushing | Damon Bankston | 10 carries, 57 yards |
| New Mexico | Receiving | Keagan Johnson | 4 receptions, 42 yards |
| Minnesota | Passing | Drake Lindsey | 18/28, 147 yards, 2 TD |
| Minnesota | Rushing | Darius Taylor | 24 carries, 116 yards, TD |
| Minnesota | Receiving | Jalen Smith | 6 receptions, 64 yards, 2 TD |

== Personnel ==
=== Transfers ===
==== Outgoing ====
| Player | Position | Destination |
|---|---|---|
| Luke Wysong | WR | Arizona |
| Keayen Nead | TE | BYU |
| Lajuan Owens | OL | California |
| Moso'oipala Tuitele | DE | Colorado State |
| Everett Hunter | TE | Eastern Michigan |
| De'Jon Benton | DL | Hawaii |
| McKenzie Agnello | OL | Houston |
| Jer'marques Bailey | OL | Houston Christian |
| Caleb Medford | WR | Kansas State |
| Wallace Unamba | OL | Kentucky |
| Nic Trujillo | WR | Louisiana–Monroe |
| Justin Beadles | DL | Louisville |
| Nigel Williams | DB | Louisville |
| Pierre Kemeni Jr. | DB | Ohio |
| Brendan Durkin | LS | Old Dominion |
| Trace Bruckler | TE | Ole Miss |
| Blake Tabaracci | LB | San Jose State |
| Max Elkman | DL | Southeastern Louisiana |
| Eli Sanders | RB | USC |
| NaQuari Rogers | RB | Utah |
| Devon Dampier | QB | Utah |
| Antoineo Harris Jr. | DE | Utah State |
| Noah Avinger | DB | Utah State |
| Bobby Arnold III | DB | Utah State |
| D'Angelo Mayes | WR | Utah State |
| Hyrum Hatch | LS | Utah State |
| Bryson Taylor | S | Utah State |
| Javen Jacobs | RB | Utah State |
| Jayden Wilson | LB | UTEP |
| Christian Ellis | S | Virginia Tech |
| Tavien Ford | OL | Unknown |
| James Bailey | OL | Unknown |
| Matthew Toilolo | IOL | Unknown |
| Takeshi Faupula | RB | Unknown |
| Jahvante Royal | CB | Unknown |
| Skylar Cook | S | Unknown |
| Tavian Combs | S | Withdrawn |
| Elijah Brody | ATH | Withdrawn |
| Malik Aliane | OL | Withdrawn |
| Richard Pearce | OL | Withdrawn |
| Jawaun Singletary | OL | Withdrawn |
| Max Lantzsch | DE | Withdrawn |

==== Incoming ====
| Player | Position | Previous school |
|---|---|---|
| Tyler Lawrence | OL | Air Force |
| Nevell Brown | OL | Alabama A&M |
| Dorian Thomas | TE | Arizona |
| CJ Johnson | S | Auburn |
| Mason Jones | OL | Bucknell |
| Simon Mapa | TE | California |
| Aiden Valdez | TE | Campbell |
| Jordan Mora | OL | Cerritos CC |
| Isaiah Blair | WR | Cerritos CC |
| Kaden Robnett | OL | Idaho |
| Abraham Williams | DB | Idaho |
| Jaxton Eck | LB | Idaho |
| Deshaun Buchanan | RB | Idaho |
| Jack Layne | QB | Idaho |
| Xavier Slayton | DL | Idaho |
| Keyshawn James-Newby | DE | Idaho |
| Ky'won McCray | LB | Jacksonville State |
| Keagan Johnson | WR | Kansas State |
| Israel Mukwiza | OL | Mercer |
| Scottre Humphrey | RB | Montana State |
| RJ Adams | OL | North Carolina A&T |
| Chris Gant Jr. | S | North Texas |
| Albert Nunes | S | Northern Iowa |
| Austin Brawley | S | Ohio |
| DJ McKinney | RB | Sam Houston |
| Azariah Levells | DB | Stephen F. Austin |
| Cade Keith | TE | TCU |
| Brian Booker | DL | Texas Southern |
| Caleb Coleman | S | Texas State |
| Clint Stephens | S | UCLA |
| Cole Welliver | QB | UConn |
| Trey Dubuc | LS | USF |
| Jayden Sheridan | DB | Utah Tech |
| Darren Agu | DE | Vanderbilt |
| Frankie Edwards | DB | Weber State |
| Keayen Nead | TE | Weber State |
| Damon Bankston | RB | Weber State |

=== Coaching staff additions ===
| Name | New position | Previous team | Previous position | Source |
|---|---|---|---|---|
| Jason Eck | Head coach | Idaho | Head coach | |
| Luke Schleusner | Offensive coordinator/Quarterbacks | Idaho | Offensive coordinator/Quarterbacks | |
| Daniel Da Prato | Associate head coach/Special teams | Texas State | Associate head coach/Special teams | |
| Stanley Franks Jr. | Defensive backs/Pass game coordinator | Idaho | Cornerbacks | |
| John Johnson | Running backs | Sam Houston | Assistant head coach/Running backs | |
| Cody Booth | Offensive line | Idaho | Offensive line | |
| Hebron Fangupo | Defensive line | Idaho | Defensive line | |

=== Coaching staff departures ===
| Name | Position | New team | New position | Source |
|---|---|---|---|---|
| Bronco Mendenhall | Head coach | Utah State | Head coach | |
| Jason Beck | Offensive coordinator/Quarterbacks | Utah | Offensive coordinator/Quarterbacks | |
| Nick Howell | Defensive coordinator | Utah State | Defensive coordinator | |
| Shane Hunter | Special teams/Linebackers | Utah State | Special teams/Linebackers | |
| Kirk Garner | Running backs | Utah State | Running backs | |
| Matt Johns | Tight ends | Utah State | Quarterbacks | |
| Jan Jorgensen | Edge | Utah State | Outside linebackers | |
| Charles Mack | Defensive backs | Utah State | Cornerbacks | |
| Donte Wilkins | Defensive line | Utah State | Defensive line | |
