= Kansei Matsuzawa =

Japanese gridiron football player (born 1999)

No. 38 – Las Vegas Raiders
- Position: Placekicker
- Roster status: Practice squad

Personal information
- Born: 8 January 1999 (age 27); Ichikawa, Chiba, Japan
- Listed height: 6 ft 2 in (1.88 m)
- Listed weight: 200 lb (91 kg)

Career information
- High school: Makuhari Sogo (Chiba)
- College: Hocking (2021–2022); Hawaii (2023–2025)
- NFL draft: 2026: undrafted
- CFL draft: 2026G: 2nd round, 18th overall pick

Career history
- Las Vegas Raiders (2026–present)*
- * Offseason or practice squad member only

Awards and highlights
- Consensus All-American (2025); MW Special Teams Player of the Year (2025); First-team All-Mountain West (2025)
- Stats at Pro Football Reference

Kansei Matsuzawa (松澤寛政, Matsuzawa Kansei; born 8 January 1999), nicknamed "The Tokyo Toe", is a Japanese American football kicker for Las Vegas Raiders of the National Football League (NFL). He played college football for the Hocking Hawks and Hawaii Rainbow Warriors and was signed by the Raiders as an undrafted free agent in 2026.

== Early life ==
Matsuzawa planned to play college soccer in Japan, but failed a required examination. His father, who had played youth American football, sent his son to visit the United States in 2018, where he attended a Monday Night Football Rams-Raiders game.

== College career ==
Wanting to play in the NFL, Matsuzawa realized that the best way to do so would be as a placekicker. He taught himself how to kick the ball from YouTube videos while working at a Morton's Steakhouse in Tokyo for three years to save money. Matsuzawa sent footage of his kicking to American universities; only Hocking College in Nelsonville, Ohio was interested.

At Hocking, Matsuzawa learned English and converted 12 field goals, the longest 50 yards. In 2023, he transferred to the University of Hawaii but did not appear in any games. In his junior season, Matsuzawa started every game, led the team in scoring, and received an athletic scholarship at the end of the year.

During the first game of the 2025 season, Matsuzawa converted a field goal as time expired to beat Stanford, helping him win the Mountain West Conference Special Teams Player of the Week award. As of 3 December 2025 Matsuzawa was among the best kickers in college football, having made 25 of 26 field goals, the longest 52 yards, and 37 of 37 extra points.

On December 16, 2025, Matsuzawa was named as a consensus All-American, the first University of Hawaii player to earn the honor. He was named to the first team by the American Football Coaches Association, CBS Sports, the Associated Press, and the Walter Camp Football Foundation.

== Professional career ==
Pre-draft measurables
Height	Weight	Arm length	Hand span	Wingspan
6 ft 1 in (1.85 m)	205 lb (93 kg)	30 5/8 in (0.78 m)	8 1/2 in (0.22 m)	6 ft 0 7/8 in (1.85 m)
All values from HBCU Combine

After going unselected in the 2026 NFL draft, Matsuzawa signed with the Las Vegas Raiders as an undrafted free agent. Matsuzawa is a member of the NFL's International Player Pathway class of 2026. Additionally, Matsuzawa was drafted in the second round (18th overall) by the Saskatchewan Roughriders of the Canadian Football League in the 2026 CFL global draft. During the 2026 NFL preseason, Matsuzawa missed his only field-goal attempt while going 1-for-3 on extra-point tries and was waived by the Raiders as a part of final roster cuts on August 30, 2026. The following day, Las Vegas re–signed Matsuzawa to their practice squad.

== Personal life ==
Matsuzawa was born in Tokyo, Japan and attended Makuhari Sogo High School. Matsuzawa told CNN he draws inspiration from his idol, Japanese baseball player Shohei Ohtani.
