= Keshawn =

Keshawn is an African American male given name. Notable people with the name include:

- Keshawn Banks (born 1999), American football player
- Keshawn Justice (born 1999), American basketball player
- Keshawn Martin (born 1990), American football wide receiver
- Ke'Shawn Vaughn (born 1997), American football player
- Ke'Shawn Williams (born 2001), American football player

== See also ==
- Keyshawn, given name
