= Owen Chambliss =

American football player

No. 33 – Nebraska Cornhuskers
- Position: Linebacker
- Class: Redshirt Junior

Personal information
- Listed height: 6 ft 3 in (1.91 m)
- Listed weight: 230 lb (104 kg)

Career information
- High school: Centennial (Corona, California)
- College: Utah (2023); San Diego State (2024–2025); Nebraska (2026–present)

Awards and highlights
- First-team All-Mountain West (2025)
- Stats at ESPN

Owen Chambliss is an American football linebacker for the Nebraska Cornhuskers. He previously played for the San Diego State Aztecs and the Utah Utes.

== Early life ==
Chambliss attended Centennial High School in Corona, California. Coming out of high school, he was rated as a three-star recruit by 247Sports and committed to play college football for the Utah Utes over offers from other schools such as Arizona, Boise State, Boston College, Colorado State, Kansas, Minnesota, Oregon State, Princeton, UNLV, USC, and Utah State.

== College career ==
=== Utah ===
As a freshman in 2023, Chambliss notched one tackle and took a redshirt, after which he entered his name into the NCAA transfer portal.

=== San Diego State ===
Chambliss transferred to play for the San Diego State Aztecs. In 2024, he totaled 31 tackles. Chambliss entered the 2025 season as a starter on the Aztecs defense. In weeks 11 and 12, he combined for 26 tackles with three being for a loss, two sacks, and an interception. After playing in the 2025 New Mexico Bowl, Chambliss announced he would enter the NCAA transfer portal. He finished the 2025 season with 110 tackles with nine and a half being for a loss and four sacks, earning first-team all-Mountain West honors.
