= Jayden Virgin-Morgan =

American football player

No. 5 – Boise State Broncos
- Position: Defensive end
- Class: Redshirt Senior

Personal information
- Listed height: 6 ft 3 in (1.91 m)
- Listed weight: 260 lb (118 kg)

Career information
- High school: Mt. Carmel (San Diego, California)
- College: Boise State (2022–present)

Awards and highlights
- First-team All-MW (2024); Second-team All-Mountain West (2025)

Jayden Virgin-Morgan is an American college football defensive end for the Boise State Broncos.

== Early life ==
Virgin-Morgan attended Mt. Carmel High School in San Diego, California. He played linebacker and tight end in high school. During his high school career he had 144 tackles and 20 sacks on defense and 73 receptions for 1,273 yards and 15 touchdowns on offense. Virgin-Morgan committed to Boise State University to play college football.

== College career ==
Virgin-Morgan played at three games his first year at Boise State in 2022. As a redshirt freshman he played in all 14 games with six starts and had 23 tackles. As a redshirt sophomore in 2024, he started all 14 games, recording 40 tackles and a team leading 10 sacks.
