= Danny Scudero =

American football player

No. 18 – Colorado Buffaloes
- Position: Wide receiver
- Class: Redshirt Junior

Personal information
- Listed height: 5 ft 9 in (1.75 m)
- Listed weight: 175 lb (79 kg)

Career information
- High school: Archbishop Mitty (San Jose, California)
- College: Sacramento State (2023–2024); San Jose State (2025); Colorado (2026–present)

Awards and highlights
- First-team All-Mountain West (2025)
- Stats at ESPN

Danny Scudero is an American football wide receiver for the Colorado Buffaloes. He previously played for the Sacramento State Hornets and San Jose State Spartans.

== Early life ==
Scudero attended Archbishop Mitty High School in San Jose, California. He was rated as a three-star recruit, and committed to play college football for the Sacramento State Hornets.

== College career ==
After redshirting in 2023, Scudero became a starter for Sacramento State in 2024, hauling in 52 passes for 664 yards and five touchdowns. He was named to the FCS all-American team. After the conclusion of the 2024 season, he entered his name into the NCAA transfer portal.

Scudero transferred to play for the San Jose State Spartans. In the 2025 season opener, he hauled in nine receptions for 189 yards and a touchdown against Central Michigan. In week 2, Scudero tallied seven catches for 60 yards in a loss to Texas. In week 6, he notched seven receptions for 151 yards and a touchdown in a victory over New Mexico. Scudero brought in 1291 receiving yards, which was the most receiving yards for the regular season in the nation. After the conclusion of the 2025 season, he entered his name into the NCAA transfer portal for a second time.

On January 4, 2026, Scudero announced he would transfer to Colorado.

== Career statistics ==
Season	Team	Games		Receiving				Rushing			
Season	Team	GP	GS	Rec	Yds	Avg	TD	Att	Yds	Avg	TD
2023	Sacramento State	6	0	—	—	—	—	2	21	10.5	1
2024	Sacramento State	11	11	53	667	12.6	5	1	25	25.0	1
2025	San Jose State	12	12	88	1,291	14.7	10	—	—	—	—
NCAA Career		29	23	141	1,958	13.9	15	3	46	15.3	2
