= Trey White =

American football player (born 2004)

No. 2 – Texas Tech Red Raiders
- Position: Defensive end
- Class: Redshirt Senior

Personal information
- Born: May 25, 2004 (age 22); Chula Vista, California, U.S.
- Listed height: 6 ft 2 in (1.88 m)
- Listed weight: 255 lb (116 kg)

Career information
- High school: Eastlake (Chula Vista, California)
- College: San Diego State (2022–2025); Texas Tech (2026–present)

Awards and highlights
- 2× First-team All-MW (2024, 2025)
- Stats at ESPN

Treyton Joseph White (born May 25, 2004) is an American college football defensive end for the Texas Tech Red Raiders. He previously played for the San Diego State Aztecs.

== Early life ==
White attended Eastlake High School in Chula Vista, California. He was rated as a two-star recruit by recruit services and committed to play college football for the San Diego State Aztecs over offers from Air Force, Arizona, Army, Cal Poly, and Northern Arizona.

== College career ==
In his first two seasons (2022–2023), White appeared in 15 games, recording 16 tackles (two for a loss), one pass deflection, one interception, and one fumble recovery. Heading into the 2024 season, he was named one of the team captains for the Aztecs. In week six of the 2024 season, White was named the Mountain West Conference Defensive Player of the Week after recording four tackles for loss and three sacks in a win over Hawaii. Midseason, he was named to the Bednarik Award watchlist after leading the nation in sacks through the first half of the season.
