= Centennial High School (Corona, California) =

Public high school in California, United States

Location
- 1820 Rimpau Avenue; Corona, California 92881; United States; 33°51′32″N 117°32′44″W

Information
- Type: Public high school
- Motto: Together We Can, Together We Will
- Established: 1989
- School district: Corona-Norco Unified School District
- Principal: Henry Romero
- Teaching staff: 115.55 (on an FTE basis)
- Enrollment: 2,816 (2023-2024)
- Student to teacher ratio: 24.37
- Colors: Red; Black; White
- Team name: Huskies
- Rival: Santiago High School
- Website: centennial.cnusd.k12.ca.us

Centennial High School (commonly referred to as CHS or CeHS orcen10) is a California Distinguished, public high school in the city of Corona, California, United States. It is one of eight high schools in the Corona-Norco Unified School District and is the only high school in the district that provides the International Baccalaureate program of study.

== Athletics ==
Centennial High was a member of the Mountain View League, however in the 2007–2008 school year the Mountain View League combined with another league and is now the Big VIII League.

Fall sports:

- Cross Country JV/V (boys)
- Cross Country JV/V (girls)
- Football FR/JV/V (boys)
- Golf V (girls)
- Tennis JV/V (girls)
- Volleyball FR/JV/V (girls)
- Water polo JV/V (boys)

Winter sports:

- Basketball FR/JV/V (boys)
- Basketball FR/JV/V (girls)
- Soccer FR/JV/V (boys)
- Soccer FR/JV/V (girls)
- Water Polo JV/V (girls)
- Wrestling FR/JV/V (boys)
- Wrestling (girls) JV/V

Spring sports:

- Baseball FR/JV/V (boys)
- Golf V (boys)
- Softball FR/JV/V (girls)
- Swimming JV/V (boys)
- Swimming JV/V (girls)
- Tennis JV/V (boys)
- Track & Field JV/V (boys)
- Track & Field JV/V (girls)
- Volleyball JV/V (boys)
- Lacrosse JV/V (girls)
- Lacrosse JV/V (boys)

=== Football ===
The 2008 Centennial football team was undefeated and won its first State Championship.

== Notable alumni ==
- Lonie Paxton (1996) – long snapper for the Denver Broncos
- Robby Felix (2005) – former NFL center
- Brandon Magee (2008) – outside linebacker for the Cleveland Browns
- Matt Scott (2008) – quarterback for the Edmonton Elks
- Vontaze Burfict (2009) – middle linebacker for the Oakland Raiders
- Taylor Martinez (2009) – quarterback for the Philadelphia Eagles
- Amanda Nguyen (2009, valedictorian), drafted the Sexual Assault Survivors' Rights Act, First Vietnamese Female-astronaut
- Will Sutton (2009) – defensive tackle for the Chicago Bears
- Mike Caffey (2011) – professional basketball player
- Cameron Hunt (2013) - guard for the Oakland Raiders
- Khalil Ahmad (2015) – basketball player in the Israeli Basketball Premier League
- Sedrick Barefield (2015) – guard who plays professionally in the Philippines
- Ike Anigbogu (2016) – center for the Indiana Pacers
- Camryn Bynum (2016) – safety for the Indianapolis Colts
- Javon McKinley (2016) – NFL player for the Detroit Lions
- J. J. Taylor (2016) – running back for the New England Patriots
- Segun Olubi (2017) – linebacker for the Indianapolis Colts
- Tanner McKee (2018) – quarterback for the Philadelphia Eagles
- Drake Jackson (2019) – defensive end for the San Francisco 49ers
- Gary Bryant Jr. (2020) – wide receiver for the Oregon Ducks
- Jaylen Clark (2020) – shooting guard for the Minnesota Timberwolves
- Jake Retzlaff (2020) – college American football quarterback for the BYU Cougars
- Kylan Boswell (2022 - transferred) - Basketball player for the Illinois Fighting Illini
- Donovan Dent (2022) - basketball player for the New Mexico Lobos
- Owen Chambliss (2023) – college football linebacker for the San Diego State Aztecs
- Jared McCain (2023) – guard for the Oklahoma City Thunder
- Carter Bryant (2024) - 1st Round NBA Draft Pick basketball player for the San Antonio Spurs
- Husan Longstreet (2025) - football player for the USC Trojans
