= Segun Olubi =

American football player (born 1999)

No. 50 – Las Vegas Raiders
- Position: Linebacker
- Roster status: Active

Personal information
- Born: November 1, 1999 (age 27); Downingtown, Pennsylvania, U.S.
- Listed height: 6 ft 2 in (1.88 m)
- Listed weight: 220 lb (100 kg)

Career information
- High school: Centennial (Corona, California)
- College: College of Idaho (2017); Saddleback (2018); Harding (2019); San Diego State (2020–2021)
- NFL draft: 2022: undrafted

Career history
- San Francisco 49ers (2022); Indianapolis Colts (2022–2025); Las Vegas Raiders (2026–present)

Career NFL statistics as of 2025
- Total tackles: 27
- Fumble recoveries: 1
- Interceptions: 1
- Blocked Punts: 2
- Stats at Pro Football Reference

Oluwasegun Olubi (born November 1, 1999) is an American professional football linebacker for the Las Vegas Raiders of the National Football League (NFL). He played college football for the College of Idaho Coyotes, Saddleback Gauchos, Harding Bisons, and San Diego State Aztecs. He was signed by the San Francisco 49ers as an undrafted free agent in 2022.

== Early life and college ==
Olubi was born on November 1, 1999, in Downingtown, Pennsylvania. His parents were immigrants from Nigeria. Olubi's family moved to New Jersey soon after his birth, then to St. Paul, Minnesota, when he was two, and later to Bullhead City, Arizona. At 10 years old, his family moved to London, England, where he spent some time before moving back to Bullhead City and later to Corona, California. He attended Centennial High School in Corona and was a three-year varsity letter winner in both football and track and field. His bests in track were 11.33 (seconds) in the 100 meters and 23.23 in the 200 meters. Olubi also recorded a 22' 3'' long jump and a school-record 45' 11'' triple jump. In football, he recorded 38 tackles, an interception and one pass breakup in eight games as a senior, earning all-league honors.

Olubi began his college career by attending the College of Idaho, in Caldwell, whose football team competes in the National Association of Intercollegiate Athletics (NAIA). In one season there, he placed second on the team in tackles with 85, and additionally made a half-sack, 10 pass breakups, one fumble forced and a kick blocked. Olubi then transferred to Saddleback College in Mission Viejo, California, recording a team-leading 54 tackles, two sacks, and an interception in his only season at the school. At Saddleback, he "made his way without a meal plan by foraging at his two burger jobs with Five Guys and In-N-Out," according to The San Diego Union-Tribune.

Ollubi transferred to Harding University in Searcy, Arkansas, in 2019, but only spent one year there as he decided to leave when they discontinued his economics major. In his one season with the football team, he appeared in 12 games, recording 23 tackles, 5.5 sacks and a fumble recovery. In 2020, Olubi joined San Diego State University, having been given a chance as a walk-on after convincing the team through a coach who knew one of their coaches.

Olubi saw limited playing time in his first season with the football team, a Division I FBS program. In seven games as a backup, he recorded 15 tackles, five of which were solo. His highlight of the season came against Hawaii, where he recorded a 71-yard interception return touchdown. Prior to the 2021 season, it was announced that he had been put on scholarship. He was also voted team captain by teammates for the season. Olubi appeared in 14 games in 2021, seven of which he started, recording 53 total tackles, two sacks and two forced fumbles. He was among the 88 nominees for the Burlsworth Trophy, given to the best player who started his college career as a walk-on, but ultimately did not win it.

== Professional career ==
Pre-draft measurables
Height	Weight	Arm length	Hand span	Wingspan	40-yard dash	10-yard split	20-yard split	20-yard shuttle	Three-cone drill	Vertical jump	Broad jump	Bench press
6 ft 0 1/8 in (1.83 m)	225 lb (102 kg)	31 3/4 in (0.81 m)	7 7/8 in (0.20 m)	6 ft 6 1/8 in (1.98 m)	4.45 s	1.57 s	2.63 s	4.31 s	7.04 s	34.5 in (0.88 m)	9 ft 11 in (3.02 m)	21 reps
All values from Pro Day

=== San Francisco 49ers ===
After going unselected in the 2022 NFL draft, Olubi was signed by the San Francisco 49ers as an undrafted free agent. He was released by San Francisco as a part of final roster cuts on August 30, 2022.

=== Indianapolis Colts ===
On September 1, 2022, Olubi was signed to the practice squad of the Indianapolis Colts. He was elevated to the active roster for their Week 16 game against the Los Angeles Chargers, and made his debut in the loss, appearing on nine special teams snaps. Olubi appeared in one further game for the team and recorded a single tackle. Olubi signed a reserve/future contract with Indianapolis on January 9, 2023. He made the team's final roster entering the 2023 season.

On January 8, 2024, Olubi signed a one-year contract extension with the Colts. On October 5, 2025, Olubi blocked AJ Cole III’s punt in the Colts' matchup against the Las Vegas Raiders.

=== Las Vegas Raiders ===
On March 16, 2026, the Las Vegas Raiders signed Olubi to a one-year $1.14 million contract. He was released by Las Vegas as a part of final roster cuts on August 30. The following day, Las Vegas re–signed Olubi to their active roster.
