= Chris Johnson (cornerback, born 2004) =

American football player (born 2004)

No. 3 – Miami Dolphins
- Position: Cornerback
- Roster status: Active

Personal information
- Born: November 9, 2004 (age 22); Long Beach, California, U.S.
- Listed height: 6 ft 0 in (1.83 m)
- Listed weight: 196 lb (89 kg)

Career information
- High school: Eleanor Roosevelt (Eastvale, California)
- College: San Diego State (2022–2025)
- NFL draft: 2026: 1st round, 27th overall pick

Career history
- Miami Dolphins (2026–present)

Awards and highlights
- Second-team All-American (2025); MW co-Defensive Player of the Year (2025); First-team All-Mountain West (2025)

Career NFL statistics as of Week 10, 2026
- Total tackles: 46
- Pass deflections: 4
- Interceptions: 2
- Forced fumbles: 1
- Defensive touchdowns: 1
- Stats at Pro Football Reference

Anthony Christopher Johnson (born November 9, 2004) is an American professional football cornerback for the Miami Dolphins of the National Football League (NFL). He played college football for the San Diego State Aztecs and was selected by the Dolphins in the first round of the 2026 NFL draft.

== Early life ==
Johnson attended Eleanor Roosevelt High School in Eastvale, California. He played cornerback and wide receiver in high school. As a senior, he had 62 tackles and three interceptions on defense and 16 receptions for 342 yards and six touchdowns on offense. He committed to San Diego State University to play college football.

== College career ==
As a freshman at SDSU in 2022, Johnson played in 12 games, recording six tackles, and as a sophomore in 2023 played in 12 games with 30 tackles and an interception. He started all 12 games his junior year in 2024, and had 67 tackles, one interception and three forced fumbles. Johnson returned to San Diego State for his senior year in 2025.

== Professional career ==
Pre-draft measurables
Height	Weight	Arm length	Hand span	Wingspan	40-yard dash	10-yard split	20-yard split	20-yard shuttle	Vertical jump	Broad jump	Bench press
6 ft 0 3/8 in (1.84 m)	193 lb (88 kg)	30 5/8 in (0.78 m)	9 7/8 in (0.25 m)	6 ft 4 3/8 in (1.94 m)	4.40 s	1.54 s	2.57 s	4.12 s	38.0 in (0.97 m)	10 ft 6 in (3.20 m)	17 reps
All values from NFL Combine/Pro Day

Johnson was selected in the first round of the 2026 NFL draft with the 27th overall pick by the Miami Dolphins. Miami received the selection and the 138th overall pick from the San Francisco 49ers on draft night in exchange for their 30th and 90th overall picks.
