= Keyshawn James-Newby =

American football player (born 2002)

No. 50 – Philadelphia Eagles
- Position: Outside linebacker
- Roster status: Practice squad

Personal information
- Born: August 8, 2002 (age 24); Pocatello, Idaho, U.S.
- Listed height: 6 ft 2 in (1.88 m)
- Listed weight: 240 lb (109 kg)

Career information
- High school: Helena (Helena, Montana)
- College: Montana Tech (2021–2022); Idaho (2023–2024); New Mexico (2025)
- NFL draft: 2026: 7th round, 252nd overall pick

Career history
- Philadelphia Eagles (2026–present)

Awards and highlights
- First-team FCS All-American (2024); First-team All-Mountain West (2025); First-team All-Big Sky (2024)
- Stats at Pro Football Reference

Keyshawn James-Newby (born August 8, 2002) is an American professional football outside linebacker for the Philadelphia Eagles of the National Football League (NFL). He played college football for the Montana Tech Orediggers, Idaho Vandals and New Mexico Lobos. James-Newby was selected by the Eagles in the seventh round of the 2026 NFL draft.

== Early life ==
James-Newby was born in Pocatello, Idaho, and initially attended Pocatello High School as a freshman before he moved to Helena, Montana, where he became a standout football player at Helena High School. He committed to play college football at Montana Tech, an NAIA school.

== College career ==
James-Newby began his college career at Montana Tech and initially focused more on his engineering studies than football. In two seasons, he recorded 92 total tackles and 13 sacks and received first-team All-Frontier Conference recognition after his sophomore season. Following the season, he transferred to Idaho to play for coach Jason Eck, having to rely on social media because he did not have access to the transfer portal due to being a NAIA athlete. In his first season for the Vandals in 2023, James-Newby had five sacks, 38 tackles, and two pass deflections in 11 games. In 2024, James-Newby tallied 64 tackles including 14.5 tackles for loss, 10 sacks and two forced fumbles in 13 games. He was named an honorable mention Associated Press FCS All-American and first-team All-Big Sky Conference honoree. James-Newby transferred to New Mexico for his final season. He had nine sacks and 15 tackles for loss on a 9–4 team, earning first-team All-Mountain West honors.

== Professional career ==
Pre-draft measurables
| Height | Weight | Arm length | Hand span | Wingspan | 40-yard dash | 10-yard split | 20-yard split | Vertical jump | Broad jump | Bench press |
|---|---|---|---|---|---|---|---|---|---|---|
| 6 ft 2 in (1.88 m) | 238 lb (108 kg) | 33 1/8 in (0.84 m) | 9 3/8 in (0.24 m) | 6 ft 7 3/4 in (2.03 m) | 4.53 s | 1.63 s | 2.66 s | 33.5 in (0.85 m) | 10 ft 0 in (3.05 m) | 21 reps |
All values from Pro Day

James-Newby was selected in the seventh round of the 2026 NFL draft with the 252nd overall pick by the Philadelphia Eagles. James-Newby was the first Eagle drafted from New Mexico since 1967. He officially signed his rookie contract for four-years, $4.365 million on May 1. James-Newby was released by the Eagles on August 30 as a part of final roster cuts; he was re-signed to the team's practice squad the next day.
