= 2025 Rate Bowl =

Postseason college football bowl game

- 36th Rate Bowl
New Mexico Lobos	Minnesota Golden Gophers
(9–3)	(7–5)
MW	Big Ten
17	20
Head coach: Jason Eck	Head coach: P.J. Fleck
	1	2	3	4	OT	Total
New Mexico	3	3	0	8	3	17
Minnesota	0	7	0	7	6	20
- Date: December 26, 2025
- Season: 2025
- Stadium: Chase Field
- Location: Phoenix, Arizona
- MVP: Jalen Smith (WR, Minnesota); Defense: Anthony Smith (DL, Minnesota)
- Favorite: Minnesota by 2.5
- Referee: Cravonne Barrett (Big 12)
- Attendance: 27,439

United States TV coverage
- Network: ESPN; ESPN Radio
- Announcers: Mike Monaco (play-by-play), Kirk Morrison (analyst), and Dawn Davenport (sideline) (ESPN); Roxy Bernstein (play-by-play) and Max Starks (analyst) (ESPN Radio)

The 2025 Rate Bowl was a college football bowl game played on December 26, 2025, at Chase Field in Phoenix, Arizona. The 36th annual Rate Bowl began at approximately 2:30 p.m. MST and aired on ESPN. The Rate Bowl was one of the 2025–26 bowl games concluding the 2025 FBS football season. The title sponsor for the game was the Rate residential mortgage company.

The 2025 Rate Bowl featured the Minnesota Golden Gophers (7–5) of the Big Ten Conference and the New Mexico Lobos (9–3) of the Mountain West Conference. The score was 14–14 at the end of regulation. In the first overtime period, New Mexico scored a field goal, then Minnesota scored a touchdown to win the game by a 20–17 score.

== Teams ==
This was the first ever meeting between Minnesota and New Mexico.

=== New Mexico Lobos ===
New Mexico opened their season with loss at Michigan, followed by three wins in a row. Back-to-back losses gave them a 3–3 record in mid-October. The Lobos then won all six of their remaining games, and entered the Rate Bowl with a 9–3 record.

=== Minnesota Golden Gophers ===
Minnesota won three of their first four games; a loss to then top-ranked Ohio State followed by two wins gave them a 5–2 record in mid-October. The Golden Gophers lost three of their final five games, leaving them with a record of 7–5 entering the Rate Bowl.

== Game summary ==
2025 Rate Bowl

Quarter	1	2	3	4	OT	Total
New Mexico	3	3	0	8	3	17
Minnesota	0	7	0	7	6	20

at Chase Field • Phoenix, Arizona

- Date: Friday, December 26, 2025
- Game time: 2:30 p.m. MST
- Game weather: n/a (indoor)
- Game attendance: 27,439
- Referee: Cravonne Barrett
- TV announcers (ESPN): Mike Monaco (play-by-play), Kirk Morrison (analyst), and Dawn Davenport (sideline)
- Box score

Game information

First quarter

- (1:47) UNM – Luke Drzewiecki 31-yard field goal (15 plays, 66 yards, 8:35; UNM 3–0)

Second quarter

- (6:18) UNM – Luke Drzewiecki 29-yard field goal (11 plays, 34 yards, 5:57; UNM 6–0)
- (2:00) MINN – Jalen Smith 10-yard pass from Drake Lindsey (Brady Denaburg kick) (9 plays, 75 yards, 4:21; MINN 7–6)

Third quarter

No scoring plays

Fourth quarter

- (13:34) MINN – Darius Taylor 5-yard run (Brady Denaburg kick) (12 plays, 80 yards, 6:37; MINN 14–6)
- (13:30) UNM – Damon Bankston 100-yard kickoff return (Jack Layne pass to Keagan Johnson for two-point conversion) (Tied 14–14)

Overtime

- (OT) UNM – Luke Drzewiecki 36-yard field goal (4 plays, 6 yards; UNM 17–14)
- (OT) MINN – Jalen Smith 12-yard pass from Drake Lindsey (4 plays, 25 yards; MINN 20–17)

=== Statistics ===
Statistics	UNM	MINN
First downs	17	16
Plays–yards	66–204	60–252
Rushes–yards	38–116	32–105
Passing yards	88	147
Passing: comp–att–int	15–28–1	18–28–0
Time of possession	30:29	29:31

Team	Category	Player	Statistics
New Mexico	Passing	Jack Layne	14/25, 88 yards, INT
New Mexico	Rushing	Damon Bankston	10 carries, 57 yards
New Mexico	Receiving	Keagan Johnson	4 receptions, 42 yards
Minnesota	Passing	Drake Lindsey	18/28, 147 yards, 2 TDs
Minnesota	Rushing	Darius Taylor	24 carries, 116 yards, TD
Minnesota	Receiving	Jalen Smith	6 receptions, 64 yards, 2 TDs
